= Results of the 1963 Queensland state election =

Queensland state election, 1 June 1963 Legislative Assembly << 1960–1966 >>
Enrolled voters	830,436^{[1]}				
Votes cast	783,034		Turnout	94.29	+1.75
Informal votes	12,036		Informal	1.54	+0.23
Summary of votes by party
Party	Primary votes	%	Swing	Seats	Change
Labor	337,928	43.83	+3.94	26	+1
Liberal	183,185	23.76	–0.27	20	±0
Country	156,621	20.31	+0.81	26	±0
Queensland Labor	55,711	7.23	–5.05	1	–3
Independent (ex-QLP)	11,810	1.53	+1.53	2	+2
North Queensland Labor	8,229	1.07		1	±0
Ind. Conservative	3,028	0.39		1	+1
Independent	12,052	1.56	–2.60	1	–1
Total	770,998			78	

This is a list of electoral district results for the 1963 Queensland state election.

This election saw the return of preferential voting after first past the post voting was in effect for elections from 1944 to 1960.

== Results by electoral district ==
=== Albert ===
1963 Queensland state election: Albert
Party	Candidate	Votes	%	±%
Country	Cec Carey	4,191	44.4	+4.8
Independent	Ernest Harley	3,225	34.1	−2.3
Labor	Eugene Ulrick	2,026	21.5	−0.9
Total formal votes		9,442	99.3	+0.3
Informal votes		68	0.7	−0.3
Turnout		9,510	93.1	+0.2
Two-party-preferred result
Country	Cec Carey	6,771	71.7	
Labor	Eugene Ulrick	2,671	28.3	
Two-candidate-preferred result
Country	Cec Carey	5,281	55.9	
Independent	Ernest Harley	4,161	44.1	
Country hold		Swing	N/A	

=== Ashgrove ===
1963 Queensland state election: Ashgrove
Party	Candidate	Votes	%	±%
Liberal	Douglas Tooth	5,621	54.7	+4.4
Labor	Terry Kearney	3,653	35.6	+0.3
Queensland Labor	George Cook	992	9.7	−4.7
Total formal votes		10,266	98.7	−0.1
Informal votes		130	1.3	+0.1
Turnout		10,396	95.6	+1.3
Two-party-preferred result
Liberal	Douglas Tooth	6,341	61.8	
Labor	Terry Kearney	3,925	38.2	
Liberal hold		Swing	N/A	

=== Aspley ===
1963 Queensland state election: Aspley
Party	Candidate	Votes	%	±%
Liberal	Fred Campbell	6,613	51.0	+3.9
Labor	Edward Humbler	5,145	39.7	−0.5
Queensland Labor	Brian Balaam	1,219	9.4	−3.3
Total formal votes		12,977	99.1	+0.4
Informal votes		119	0.9	−0.4
Turnout		13,096	95.3	+1.3
Two-party-preferred result
Liberal	Fred Campbell	7,639	58.9	
Labor	Edward Humbler	5,338	41.1	
Liberal hold		Swing	N/A	

=== Aubigny ===
1963 Queensland state election: Aubigny
Party	Candidate	Votes	%	±%
Queensland Labor	Les Diplock	4,644	52.4	+6.5
Country	Somerset Thorn	3,017	34.0	−8.9
Labor	Bruce Strachan	1,198	13.5	+2.3
Total formal votes		8,859	99.0	−0.4
Informal votes		92	1.0	+0.4
Turnout		8,951	96.0	+2.4
Two-candidate-preferred result
Queensland Labor	Les Diplock	5,280	59.6	
Country	Somerset Thorn	3,579	40.4	
Queensland Labor hold		Swing	N/A	

=== Balonne ===
1963 Queensland state election: Balonne
Party	Candidate	Votes	%	±%
Country	Eddie Beardmore	4,266	65.7	+2.6
Labor	Russell Hall	2,231	34.3	−2.6
Total formal votes		6,497	99.1	+0.3
Informal votes		59	0.9	−0.3
Turnout		6,556	90.7	+2.8
Country hold		Swing	+2.6	

=== Barambah ===
1963 Queensland state election: Barambah
Party	Candidate	Votes	%	±%
Country	Joh Bjelke-Petersen	5,715	62.9	−1.6
Labor	William Weir	2,308	25.4	+4.1
Independent	Percy Edwards	1,063	11.7	+11.7
Total formal votes		9,086	99.0	−0.1
Informal votes		93	1.0	+0.1
Turnout		9,179	96.6	+1.6
Two-party-preferred result
Country	Joh Bjelke-Petersen	6,565	72.3	
Labor	William Weir	2,521	27.7	
Country hold		Swing	N/A	

=== Barcoo ===
1963 Queensland state election: Barcoo
Party	Candidate	Votes	%	±%
Labor	Eugene O'Donnell	5,142	64.2	+17.4
Country	Gordon Vandersee	2,868	35.8	−0.3
Total formal votes		8,010	98.9	−0.4
Informal votes		87	1.1	+0.4
Turnout		8,097	93.1	+1.3
Labor hold		Swing	N/A	

=== Baroona ===
1963 Queensland state election: Baroona
Party	Candidate	Votes	%	±%
Labor	Pat Hanlon	7,601	61.4	+2.6
Liberal	Dawn Stanton	3,209	29.4	+0.8
Queensland Labor	Douglas Garsden	764	7.0	−5.6
Communist	Vincent Englart	239	2.2	+2.2
Total formal votes		10,913	97.2	−1.3
Informal votes		317	2.8	+1.3
Turnout		11,230	93.3	+1.7
Two-party-preferred result
Labor	Pat Hanlon	6,963	63.8	
Liberal	Dawn Stanton	3,950	36.2	
Labor hold		Swing	N/A	

=== Belmont ===
1963 Queensland state election: Belmont
Party	Candidate	Votes	%	±%
Labor	Fred Newton	7,846	59.3	+4.6
Liberal	Cecil Schuurs	4,593	34.7	+0.2
Queensland Labor	John Taylor	790	6.0	−4.8
Total formal votes		13,229	98.1	−0.3
Informal votes		253	1.9	+0.3
Turnout		13,482	95.1	+2.3
Two-party-preferred result
Labor	Fred Newton	7,993	60.4	
Liberal	Cecil Schuurs	5,236	39.6	
Labor hold		Swing	N/A	

=== Bowen ===
1963 Queensland state election: Bowen
Party	Candidate	Votes	%	±%
Labor	John Gralton	3,252	46.8	+7.4
Liberal	Peter Delamothe	3,230	46.5	+0.4
Queensland Labor	Jim McCane	462	6.7	−2.8
Total formal votes		6,944	98.3	−0.1
Informal votes		120	1.7	+0.1
Turnout		7,064	95.4	+1.3
Two-party-preferred result
Liberal	Peter Delamothe	3,607	51.9	
Labor	John Gralton	3,337	48.1	
Liberal hold		Swing	N/A	

=== Brisbane ===
1963 Queensland state election: Brisbane
Party	Candidate	Votes	%	±%
Labor	Johnno Mann	5,110	55.1	+3.5
Liberal	James Rowan	3,081	33.2	+3.4
Queensland Labor	Jack O'Connell	1,078	11.6	−6.9
Total formal votes		9,269	96.7	−1.4
Informal votes		318	3.3	+1.4
Turnout		9,587	89.6	+3.7
Two-party-preferred result
Labor	Johnno Mann	5,311	57.3	
Liberal	James Rowan	3,958	42.7	
Labor hold		Swing	N/A	

=== Bulimba ===
1963 Queensland state election: Bulimba
Party	Candidate	Votes	%	±%
Labor	Jack Houston	7,220	62.9	+6.2
Liberal	Stan Latham	3,520	30.7	+3.3
Queensland Labor	Paul Tucker	740	6.4	−9.5
Total formal votes		11,480	98.2	−0.3
Informal votes		211	1.8	+0.3
Turnout		11,691	95.7	+1.3
Two-party-preferred result
Labor	Jack Houston	7,358	64.1	
Liberal	Stan Latham	4,122	35.9	
Labor hold		Swing	N/A	

=== Bundaberg ===
1963 Queensland state election: Bundaberg
Party	Candidate	Votes	%	±%
Independent	Ted Walsh	7,011	53.5	+53.5
Labor	Matthew Tallon	6,103	46.5	+6.1
Total formal votes		13,114	98.9	+0.8
Informal votes		146	1.1	−0.8
Turnout		13,260	94.9	0.0
Independent gain from Queensland Labor		Swing	N/A	

=== Burdekin ===
1963 Queensland state election: Burdekin
Party	Candidate	Votes	%	±%
Independent	Arthur Coburn	3,888	56.2	+5.5
Labor	Thomas Niven	1,949	28.2	+8.6
Queensland Labor	Oliver Anderson	1,085	15.7	−13.9
Total formal votes		6,922	98.1	−1.1
Informal votes		133	1.9	+1.1
Turnout		7,055	94.9	+1.8
Two-candidate-preferred result
Independent	Arthur Coburn	4,430	64.0	
Labor	Thomas Niven	2,492	36.0	
Independent hold		Swing	N/A	

=== Burke ===
1963 Queensland state election: Burke
Party	Candidate	Votes	%	±%
Labor	Alec Inch	unopposed		
Labor hold		Swing		

=== Burnett ===
1963 Queensland state election: Burnett
Party	Candidate	Votes	%	±%
Country	Claude Wharton	5,947	65.1	+10.2
Labor	Denis Grace	3,185	34.9	+7.7
Total formal votes		9,132	99.0	−0.2
Informal votes		88	1.0	+0.2
Turnout		9,220	95.3	+1.6
Country hold		Swing	N/A	

=== Cairns ===
1963 Queensland state election: Cairns
Party	Candidate	Votes	%	±%
Labor	Watty Wallace	8,093	64.8	+8.3
Country	Charles Joy	3,654	29.3	−0.6
Queensland Labor	Arthur Trembath	738	5.9	−7.7
Total formal votes		12,485	97.8	−1.2
Informal votes		275	2.2	+1.2
Turnout		12,760	92.8	+2.0
Two-party-preferred result
Labor	Watty Wallace	8,230	65.9	
Country	Charles Joy	4,255	34.1	
Labor hold		Swing	N/A	

==== By-election ====
- This by-election was caused by the death of Watty Wallace. It was held on 27 February 1965.

1965 Cairns state by-election
Party	Candidate	Votes	%	±%
Labor	Ray Jones	6,569	56.2	−8.6
Country	Ronald Norman	5,120	43.8	+14.5
Total formal votes		11,689	98.5	+0.7
Informal votes		173	1.5	−0.7
Turnout		11,862	86.3	−6.5
Labor hold		Swing	−9.7	

=== Callide ===
1963 Queensland state election: Callide
Party	Candidate	Votes	%	±%
Country	Vince Jones	3,745	45.4	−16.9
Labor	Keith Coombs	2,622	31.8	−5.9
Independent	Alfred O'Rouke	1,422	17.3	+17.3
Queensland Labor	Nancy Green	451	5.5	+5.5
Total formal votes		8,240	98.6	0.0
Informal votes		119	1.4	0.0
Turnout		8,359	95.1	+2.2
Two-party-preferred result
Country	Vince Jones	5,217	63.3	+1.0
Labor	Keith Coombs	3,023	36.7	−1.0
Country hold		Swing	+1.0	

=== Carnarvon ===
1963 Queensland state election: Carnarvon
Party	Candidate	Votes	%	±%
Country	Henry McKechnie	3,157	36.4	+0.3
Queensland Labor	Paul Hilton	3,073	35.4	−5.9
Labor	Douglas Gow	2,449	28.2	+5.5
Total formal votes		8,679	98.2	−0.6
Informal votes		156	1.8	+0.6
Turnout		8,835	94.3	+2.6
Two-party-preferred result
Country	Henry McKechnie	4,950	57.0	
Labor	Douglas Gow	3,729	43.0	
Two-candidate-preferred result
Country	Henry McKechnie	4,681	53.9	
Queensland Labor	Paul Hilton	3,998	46.1	
Country gain from Queensland Labor		Swing	N/A	

=== Chatsworth ===
1963 Queensland state election: Chatsworth
Party	Candidate	Votes	%	±%
Liberal	Thomas Hiley	5,500	53.9	+0.8
Labor	Bob Bradfield	4,048	39.7	+6.0
Queensland Labor	Vince Garrigan	660	6.5	−6.7
Total formal votes		10,208	98.9	+0.1
Informal votes		108	1.1	−0.1
Turnout		10,316	95.2	+0.7
Two-party-preferred result
Liberal	Thomas Hiley	6,037	59.1	
Labor	Bob Bradfield	4,171	40.9	
Liberal hold		Swing	N/A	

=== Clayfield ===
1963 Queensland state election: Clayfield
Party	Candidate	Votes	%	±%
Liberal	John Murray	5,907	55.9	+1.6
Labor	Norm Butler	3,566	33.8	+6.1
Queensland Labor	Jack Dolan	1,085	10.3	−7.7
Total formal votes		10,558	98.6	+0.2
Informal votes		152	1.4	−0.2
Turnout		10,710	94.5	+2.6
Two-party-preferred result
Liberal	John Murray	6,790	64.3	
Labor	Norm Butler	3,768	35.7	
Liberal hold		Swing	N/A	

=== Condamine ===
1963 Queensland state election: Condamine
Party	Candidate	Votes	%	±%
Country	Vic Sullivan	4,941	73.0	+4.2
Labor	Reg Keating	1,825	27.0	−0.2
Total formal votes		6,766	99.0	−0.1
Informal votes		69	1.0	+0.1
Turnout		6,835	95.2	+2.5
Country hold		Swing	N/A	

=== Cook ===
1963 Queensland state election: Cook
Party	Candidate	Votes	%	±%
Independent	Bunny Adair	4,687	54.7	+54.7
Labor	Jack Bethel	3,875	45.3	+10.1
Total formal votes		8,562	97.7	−1.2
Informal votes		199	2.3	+1.2
Turnout		8,761	91.1	+1.2
Independent gain from Queensland Labor		Swing	N/A	

=== Cooroora ===
1963 Queensland state election: Cooroora
Party	Candidate	Votes	%	±%
Country	David Low	5,746	61.8	−9.2
Labor	Lancelot Sanderson	2,900	31.2	+2.2
Independent	Theophilus Chapman	644	6.9	+6.9
Total formal votes		9,290	98.6	0.0
Informal votes		131	1.4	0.0
Turnout		9,421	94.6	+0.4
Two-party-preferred result
Country	David Low	6,297	67.8	−3.2
Labor	Lancelot Sanderson	2,993	32.2	+3.2
Country hold		Swing	−3.2	

=== Cunningham ===
1963 Queensland state election: Cunningham
Party	Candidate	Votes	%	±%
Country	Alan Fletcher	5,522	72.8	−27.2
Labor	Brian Davis	1,585	20.9	+20.9
Queensland Labor	Herbert Scott	474	6.3	+6.3
Total formal votes		7,581	99.1	
Informal votes		72	0.9	
Turnout		7,653	94.7	
Two-party-preferred result
Country	Alan Fletcher	5,908	77.9	−22.1
Labor	Brian Davis	1,673	22.1	+22.1
Country hold		Swing	−22.1	

=== Fassifern ===
1963 Queensland state election: Fassifern
Party	Candidate	Votes	%	±%
Country	Albert Hall	3,211	35.5	−36.3
Independent	Alf Muller	3,028	33.5	+33.5
Labor	Denis O'Brien	2,314	25.6	−2.6
Queensland Labor	Kenneth Rawle	495	5.5	+5.5
Total formal votes		9,048	98.7	−0.2
Informal votes		116	1.3	+0.2
Turnout		9,164	96.7	+1.9
Two-party-preferred result
Country	Albert Hall	6,181	68.3	−3.5
Labor	Denis O'Brien	2,867	31.7	+3.5
Two-candidate-preferred result
Independent	Alf Muller	5,224	57.7	+57.7
Country	Albert Hall	3,824	42.3	−29.5
Independent gain from Country		Swing	+57.7	

=== Flinders ===
1963 Queensland state election: Flinders
Party	Candidate	Votes	%	±%
Country	Bill Longeran	4,273	55.4	+7.5
Labor	Charles Rattray	3,147	40.8	−5.8
Queensland Labor	John Judge	290	3.8	−1.7
Total formal votes		7,710	98.7	−0.4
Informal votes		99	1.3	+0.4
Turnout		7,809	91.6	−1.4
Two-party-preferred result
Country	Bill Longeran	4,517	58.6	
Labor	Charles Rattray	3,193	41.4	
Country hold		Swing	N/A	

=== Greenslopes ===
1963 Queensland state election: Greenslopes
Party	Candidate	Votes	%	±%
Liberal	Keith Hooper	6,272	56.4	+1.0
Labor	John Hughes	3,876	34.8	+6.1
Queensland Labor	Terry Burns	810	7.3	−7.5
Social Credit	Eric Allen	111	1.0	−0.1
Communist	Edmund Crisp	56	0.5	+0.5
Total formal votes		11,125	98.1	−0.6
Informal votes		213	1.9	+0.6
Turnout		11,338	95.0	+1.7
Two-party-preferred result
Liberal	Keith Hooper	6,998	62.9	
Labor	John Hughes	4,127	37.1	
Liberal hold		Swing	N/A	

=== Gregory ===
1963 Queensland state election: Gregory
Party	Candidate	Votes	%	±%
Country	Wally Rae	3,545	52.2	−2.2
Labor	Martin Laracy	2,891	42.6	−3.0
Queensland Labor	Bill Hutchinson	353	5.2	+5.2
Total formal votes		6,789	98.6	+0.1
Informal votes		93	1.4	−0.1
Turnout		6,882	87.6	+2.7
Two-party-preferred result
Country	Wally Rae	3,801	56.0	+1.6
Labor	Martin Laracy	2,988	44.0	−1.6
Country hold		Swing	+1.6	

=== Gympie ===
1963 Queensland state election: Gympie
Party	Candidate	Votes	%	±%
Country	Max Hodges	5,477	57.1	−1.0
Labor	Blair Jamieson	3,213	33.5	+3.3
Queensland Labor	Denis Tanner	897	9.4	−2.3
Total formal votes		9,587	99.1	−0.1
Informal votes		85	0.9	+0.1
Turnout		9,672	96.0	+0.4
Two-party-preferred result
Country	Max Hodges	6,207	64.7	
Labor	Blair Jamieson	3,380	35.3	
Country hold		Swing	N/A	

=== Hawthorne ===
1963 Queensland state election: Hawthorne
Party	Candidate	Votes	%	±%
Labor	Bill Baxter	5,389	51.4	0.0
Liberal	Bill Kaus	4,203	40.1	+3.3
Queensland Labor	Rogers Judge	890	8.5	−3.3
Total formal votes		10,482	98.6	−0.2
Informal votes		150	1.4	+0.2
Turnout		10,632	95.4	+1.5
Two-party-preferred result
Labor	Bill Baxter	5,555	53.0	
Liberal	Bill Kaus	4,927	47.0	
Labor hold		Swing	N/A	

=== Hinchinbrook ===
1963 Queensland state election: Hinchinbrook
Party	Candidate	Votes	%	±%
Country	John Row	4,158	56.8	+12.7
Labor	Kevin Cavanagh	2,439	33.3	−6.4
Queensland Labor	Jack Williams	514	7.0	−3.0
Communist	George Bordujenko	205	2.8	+2.8
Total formal votes		7,316	97.6	−0.8
Informal votes		178	2.4	+0.8
Turnout		7,494	94.2	+0.4
Two-party-preferred result
Country	John Row	4,617	63.1	
Labor	Kevin Cavanagh	2,699	36.9	
Country hold		Swing	N/A	

=== Ipswich East ===
1963 Queensland state election: Ipswich East
Party	Candidate	Votes	%	±%
Labor	Jim Donald	9,496	70.4	+1.2
Liberal	Hedley Scriven	3,592	26.6	+1.9
Queensland Labor	Andrij Janicky	340	2.5	−3.6
Social Credit	Vic Robb	67	0.5	+0.5
Total formal votes		13,495	99.0	−0.2
Informal votes		135	1.0	+0.2
Turnout		13,630	95.6	−0.2
Two-party-preferred result
Labor	Jim Donald	9,593	71.1	
Liberal	Hedley Scriven	3,902	28.9	
Labor hold		Swing	N/A	

=== Ipswich West ===
1963 Queensland state election: Ipswich West
Party	Candidate	Votes	%	±%
Labor	Ivor Marsden	8,196	63.8	+2.0
Liberal	Jim Cochrane	3,966	30.9	+1.6
Queensland Labor	Len Maguire	688	5.3	−2.5
Total formal votes		12,850	99.0	−0.3
Informal votes		133	1.0	+0.3
Turnout		12,983	93.0	+0.1
Two-party-preferred result
Labor	Ivor Marsden	8,324	64.8	
Liberal	Jim Cochrane	4,526	35.2	
Labor hold		Swing	N/A	

=== Isis ===
1963 Queensland state election: Isis
Party	Candidate	Votes	%	±%
Country	Jack Pizzey	5,092	57.7	−42.3
Labor	George Hooper	3,053	34.6	+34.6
Social Credit	Arnold Jones	432	4.9	+4.9
Queensland Labor	Tom Carroll	248	2.8	+2.8
Total formal votes		8,825	98.1	
Informal votes		175	1.9	
Turnout		9,000	94.0	
Two-party-preferred result
Country	Jack Pizzey	5,488	62.2	−37.8
Labor	George Hooper	3,337	37.8	+37.8
Country hold		Swing	−37.8	

=== Ithaca ===
1963 Queensland state election: Ithaca
Party	Candidate	Votes	%	±%
Liberal	Bob Windsor	5,442	51.2	+4.4
Labor	Lou Clifford	4,075	38.3	−4.2
Queensland Labor	James Ashe	951	8.9	−1.8
Social Credit	Bruce Tannock	159	1.5	+1.5
Total formal votes		10,627	98.1	−1.0
Informal votes		207	1.9	+1.0
Turnout		10,834	94.0	+1.7
Two-party-preferred result
Liberal	Bob Windsor	6,212	58.5	
Labor	Lou Clifford	4,415	41.5	
Liberal hold		Swing	N/A	

=== Kedron ===
1963 Queensland state election: Kedron
Party	Candidate	Votes	%	±%
Labor	Eric Lloyd	7,089	58.4	−2.4
Liberal	Hubertus Toonen	3,549	29.3	−0.1
Queensland Labor	Ted Doherty	906	7.5	+7.5
Independent	Ron Burrows	586	4.8	+4.8
Total formal votes		12,130	98.6	+0.2
Informal votes		172	1.4	−0.2
Turnout		12,302	96.0	+0.7
Two-party-preferred result
Labor	Eric Lloyd	7,551	62.3	
Liberal	Hubertus Toonen	4,579	37.7	
Labor hold		Swing	N/A	

=== Kurilpa ===
1963 Queensland state election: Kurilpa
Party	Candidate	Votes	%	±%
Liberal	Clive Hughes	5,602	56.2	+6.9
Labor	Bernie Dokter	3,569	35.8	−4.0
Queensland Labor	Maurice Sheehan	656	6.6	−4.3
Social Credit	Paul Kenealy	134	1.3	+1.3
Total formal votes		9,961	97.7	−0.3
Informal votes		233	2.3	+0.3
Turnout		10,194	93.3	+2.4
Two-party-preferred result
Liberal	Clive Hughes	6,203	62.3	
Labor	Bernie Dokter	3,758	37.7	
Liberal hold		Swing	N/A	

=== Landsborough ===
1963 Queensland state election: Landsborough
Party	Candidate	Votes	%	±%
Country	Frank Nicklin	6,727	74.2	−5.6
Labor	Frank Freemantle	2,343	25.8	+5.6
Total formal votes		9,070	99.2	+0.7
Informal votes		70	0.8	−0.7
Turnout		9,140	94.8	+3.2
Country hold		Swing	−5.6	

=== Lockyer ===
1963 Queensland state election: Lockyer
Party	Candidate	Votes	%	±%
Liberal	Gordon Chalk	5,035	61.6	−1.8
Labor	James Keim	2,599	32.0	+32.0
Queensland Labor	Brian Hannan	382	4.7	+4.7
Independent	James Dwyer	112	1.4	−0.7
Total formal votes		8,128	99.4	+0.4
Informal votes		49	0.6	−0.4
Turnout		8,177	96.6	+0.9
Two-party-preferred result
Liberal	Gordon Chalk	5,402	66.5	
Labor	James Keim	2,726	33.5	
Liberal hold		Swing	N/A	

=== Logan ===
1963 Queensland state election: Logan
Party	Candidate	Votes	%	±%
Country	Leslie Harrison	5,733	58.2	−3.1
Labor	William Ware	3,767	38.2	−0.5
Queensland Labor	Frank Andrews	356	3.6	+3.6
Total formal votes		9,856	98.2	+0.2
Informal votes		180	1.8	−0.2
Turnout		10,036	93.6	+1.5
Two-party-preferred result
Country	Leslie Harrison	6,033	61.2	
Labor	William Ware	3,823	38.8	
Country hold		Swing	N/A	

=== Mackay ===
1963 Queensland state election: Mackay
Party	Candidate	Votes	%	±%
Labor	Fred Graham	4,963	53.5	+3.3
Country	John Matson	3,449	37.1	−1.7
Queensland Labor	Edwin Relf	873	9.4	−1.6
Total formal votes		9,285	98.4	−0.6
Informal votes		152	1.6	+0.6
Turnout		9,437	94.9	+1.9
Two-party-preferred result
Labor	Fred Graham	5,125	55.2	
Country	John Matson	4,160	44.8	
Labor hold		Swing	N/A	

=== Mackenzie ===
1963 Queensland state election: Mackenzie
Party	Candidate	Votes	%	±%
Country	Nev Hewitt	4,305	62.7	−2.1
Labor	Patrick O'Brien	2,555	37.3	+2.1
Total formal votes		6,860	98.7	−0.1
Informal votes		87	1.3	+0.1
Turnout		6,947	94.6	+1.7
Country hold		Swing	−2.1	

=== Maryborough ===
1963 Queensland state election: Maryborough
Party	Candidate	Votes	%	±%
Labor	Horace Davies	6,758	61.9	−4.4
Country	Robert Hunter	2,829	25.9	−7.8
Queensland Labor	Vincent Wenck	847	7.7	+7.7
Social Credit	Douglas Devenish	491	4.5	+4.5
Total formal votes		10,925	99.1	−0.2
Informal votes		103	0.9	+0.2
Turnout		11,028	95.4	−1.1
Two-party-preferred result
Labor	Horace Davies	7,161	65.5	−0.8
Country	Robert Hunter	3,764	34.5	+0.8
Labor hold		Swing	−0.8	

=== Merthyr ===
1963 Queensland state election: Merthyr
Party	Candidate	Votes	%	±%
Liberal	Sam Ramsden	5,298	53.4	+3.3
Labor	Tom Campbell	3,672	37.0	+3.8
Queensland Labor	Geoffrey Traill	946	9.5	−7.2
Total formal votes		9,916	97.4	−0.7
Informal votes		268	2.6	+0.7
Turnout		10,184	91.5	+2.9
Two-party-preferred result
Liberal	Sam Ramsden	6,068	61.2	
Labor	Tom Campbell	3,848	38.8	
Liberal hold		Swing	N/A	

=== Mirani ===
1963 Queensland state election: Mirani
Party	Candidate	Votes	%	±%
Country	Ernie Evans	4,923	64.8	+1.9
Labor	George Moody	2,676	35.2	+7.5
Total formal votes		7,599	99.3	+0.5
Informal votes		56	0.7	−0.5
Turnout		7,655	94.6	+2.0
Country hold		Swing	N/A	

==== By-election ====
- This by-election was caused by the death of Ernie Evans. It was held on 15 May 1965.

1965 Mirani state by-election
Party	Candidate	Votes	%	±%
Country	Tom Newbery	4,243	57.3	−7.5
Labor	Matthew O'Neill	3,158	42.7	+7.5
Total formal votes		7,401	99.2	−0.1
Informal votes		58	0.8	+0.1
Turnout		7,459	88.1	−6.5
Country hold		Swing	−7.5	

=== Mount Coot-tha ===
1963 Queensland state election: Mount Coot-tha
Party	Candidate	Votes	%	±%
Liberal	Bill Lickiss	7,175	59.7	+2.9
Labor	Norm Maddock	3,908	32.5	+2.6
Queensland Labor	Max Muller	941	7.8	−5.5
Total formal votes		12,024	98.0	−0.3
Informal votes		248	2.0	+0.3
Turnout		12,272	95.3	+2.3
Two-party-preferred result
Liberal	Bill Lickiss	7,941	66.0	
Labor	Norm Maddock	4,083	34.0	
Liberal hold		Swing	N/A	

=== Mount Gravatt ===
1963 Queensland state election: Mount Gravatt
Party	Candidate	Votes	%	±%
Liberal	Geoff Chinchen	7,538	56.0	−0.8
Labor	Stuart Barnes	4,819	35.8	+5.9
Queensland Labor	Eric Allingham	1,108	8.2	−5.1
Total formal votes		13,465	98.5	+0.2
Informal votes		208	1.5	−0.2
Turnout		13,673	95.3	+1.8
Two-party-preferred result
Liberal	Geoff Chinchen	8,342	62.0	
Labor	Stuart Barnes	5,123	38.0	
Liberal hold		Swing	N/A	

=== Mourilyan ===
1963 Queensland state election: Mourilyan
Party	Candidate	Votes	%	±%
Labor	Peter Byrne	4,744	58.7	+4.1
Country	Alf Martinuzzi	2,456	30.4	−5.5
Queensland Labor	Geoff Higham	877	10.9	+1.4
Total formal votes		8,077	97.7	−0.9
Informal votes		191	2.3	+0.9
Turnout		8,268	94.5	+3.0
Two-party-preferred result
Labor	Peter Byrne	4,907	60.8	
Country	Alf Martinuzzi	3,170	39.2	
Labor hold		Swing	N/A	

=== Mulgrave ===
1963 Queensland state election: Mulgrave
Party	Candidate	Votes	%	±%
Country	Roy Armstrong	3,703	57.6	+8.5
Labor	Stanley Scoines	2,278	35.5	+8.3
Queensland Labor	Charles English	444	6.9	−4.4
Total formal votes		6,425	97.8	−1.1
Informal votes		143	2.2	+1.1
Turnout		6,568	94.1	+5.3
Two-party-preferred result
Country	Roy Armstrong	4,064	63.3	
Labor	Stanley Scoines	2,361	36.7	
Country hold		Swing	N/A	

=== Murrumba ===
1963 Queensland state election: Murrumba
Party	Candidate	Votes	%	±%
Country	David Nicholson	5,641	54.6	−5.9
Labor	Norman Kruger	4,286	41.5	+2.0
Queensland Labor	John Carter	328	3.2	+3.2
Independent	Francis O'Mara	74	0.7	+0.7
Total formal votes		10,329	98.1	−0.2
Informal votes		200	1.9	+0.2
Turnout		10,529	94.8	+1.7
Two-party-preferred result
Country	David Nicholson	5,916	57.3	−3.2
Labor	Norman Kruger	4,413	42.7	+3.2
Country hold		Swing	−3.2	

=== Norman ===
1963 Queensland state election: Norman
Party	Candidate	Votes	%	±%
Labor	Fred Bromley	4,928	53.2	+5.0
Liberal	Cyril Ryan	3,150	34.0	−2.1
Queensland Labor	Harry Wright	918	9.9	−4.7
Social Credit	David Gray	275	3.0	+3.0
Total formal votes		9,271	97.3	−1.5
Informal votes		254	2.7	+1.5
Turnout		9,525	93.8	+1.7
Two-party-preferred result
Labor	Fred Bromley	5,237	56.5	
Liberal	Cyril Ryan	4,034	43.5	
Labor hold		Swing	N/A	

=== Nudgee ===
1963 Queensland state election: Nudgee
Party	Candidate	Votes	%	±%
Labor	Jack Melloy	7,563	60.4	+6.7
Liberal	Dennis Hedges	3,919	31.3	−2.0
Queensland Labor	Mick O'Connor	1,033	8.3	−3.8
Total formal votes		12,515	98.0	−0.7
Informal votes		261	2.0	+0.7
Turnout		12,776	95.5	+1.6
Two-party-preferred result
Labor	Jack Melloy	7,755	62.0	
Liberal	Dennis Hedges	4,760	38.0	
Labor hold		Swing	N/A	

=== Nundah ===
1963 Queensland state election: Nundah
Party	Candidate	Votes	%	±%
Liberal	William Knox	5,860	49.8	−2.2
Labor	Frank Roberts	4,763	40.5	+8.3
Queensland Labor	Denis Cleary	1,144	9.7	−6.1
Total formal votes		11,767	98.9	+0.4
Informal votes		132	1.1	−0.4
Turnout		11,899	94.7	+1.7
Two-party-preferred result
Liberal	William Knox	6,861	58.3	
Labor	Frank Roberts	4,906	41.7	
Liberal hold		Swing	N/A	

=== Port Curtis ===
1963 Queensland state election: Port Curtis
Party	Candidate	Votes	%	±%
Labor	Martin Hanson	6,765	80.4	+11.8
Queensland Labor	Doug McClarty	1,275	15.2	+15.2
Independent	Tom Kelly	370	4.4	+4.4
Total formal votes		8,410	98.2	−0.6
Informal votes		152	1.8	+0.6
Turnout		8,562	96.1	+1.0
Two-candidate-preferred result
Labor	Martin Hanson	6,950	82.6	+14.0
Queensland Labor	Doug McClarty	1,460	17.4	+17.4
Labor hold		Swing	+14.0	

=== Redcliffe ===
1963 Queensland state election: Redcliffe
Party	Candidate	Votes	%	±%
Country	Jim Houghton	5,772	55.4	+30.6
Labor	Colin McInnes	3,697	35.5	+10.7
Queensland Labor	Michael Doyle	527	5.1	−0.7
Independent	Eric Pritchard	329	3.2	+3.2
Independent	Ernest Sykes	88	0.8	+0.8
Total formal votes		10,413	98.2	−0.7
Informal votes		195	1.8	+0.7
Turnout		10,608	94.0	+1.7
Two-party-preferred result
Country	Jim Houghton	6,425	61.7	
Labor	Colin McInnes	3,988	38.3	
Country gain from Independent		Swing	N/A	

=== Rockhampton North ===
1963 Queensland state election: Rockhampton North
Party	Candidate	Votes	%	±%
Labor	Merv Thackeray	7,933	64.9	+4.9
Liberal	Phil German	3,308	27.1	+0.8
Queensland Labor	Richard Wasson	985	8.1	−5.6
Total formal votes		12,226	98.6	−0.5
Informal votes		171	1.4	+0.5
Turnout		12,397	95.9	+0.5
Two-party-preferred result
Labor	Merv Thackeray	8,116	66.4	
Liberal	Phil German	4,110	33.6	
Labor hold		Swing	N/A	

=== Rockhampton South ===
1963 Queensland state election: Rockhampton South
Party	Candidate	Votes	%	±%
Liberal	Rex Pilbeam	5,728	47.4	+6.3
Labor	Charles White	5,179	42.9	+15.0
Queensland Labor	Stan Doolan	1,070	8.9	−22.1
Independent	Brian Dillon	93	0.8	+0.8
Total formal votes		12,070	98.6	−0.5
Informal votes		166	1.4	+0.5
Turnout		12,236	95.8	+2.1
Two-party-preferred result
Liberal	Rex Pilbeam	6,607	54.7	
Labor	Charles White	5,463	45.3	
Liberal hold		Swing	N/A	

=== Roma ===
1963 Queensland state election: Roma
Party	Candidate	Votes	%	±%
Country	William Ewan	4,962	61.5	+17.0
Labor	Herbert Williamson	2,276	28.2	−3.1
Queensland Labor	Bryan Hurley	830	10.3	+10.3
Total formal votes		8,068	99.1	−0.2
Informal votes		71	0.9	+0.2
Turnout		8,139	93.6	+0.8
Two-party-preferred result
Country	William Ewan	5,638	69.9	
Labor	Herbert Williamson	2,430	30.1	
Country hold		Swing	N/A	

=== Salisbury ===
1963 Queensland state election: Salisbury
Party	Candidate	Votes	%	±%
Labor	Doug Sherrington	8,690	64.6	+8.9
Liberal	Keith Brough	4,124	30.7	−0.8
Queensland Labor	Miroslav Jansky	631	4.7	−6.9
Total formal votes		13,445	97.7	−0.8
Informal votes		309	2.3	+0.8
Turnout		13,754	94.5	+2.5
Two-party-preferred result
Labor	Doug Sherrington	8,807	65.5	
Liberal	Keith Brough	4,648	34.5	
Labor hold		Swing	N/A	

=== Sandgate ===
1963 Queensland state election: Sandgate
Party	Candidate	Votes	%	±%
Labor	Harry Dean	5,765	55.4	+4.6
Liberal	Maurice White	3,866	37.2	−4.6
Queensland Labor	Austin McShane	767	7.4	0.0
Total formal votes		10,398	98.5	−0.2
Informal votes		160	1.5	+0.2
Turnout		10,558	94.7	+2.4
Two-party-preferred result
Labor	Harry Dean	5,908	56.8	
Liberal	Maurice White	4,490	43.2	
Labor hold		Swing	N/A	

=== Sherwood ===
1963 Queensland state election: Sherwood
Party	Candidate	Votes	%	±%
Liberal	John Herbert	7,083	60.7	−2.2
Labor	Vincent Kitson	3,855	33.1	−4.0
Queensland Labor	Len Galligan	723	6.2	+6.2
Total formal votes		11,631	98.1	−0.4
Informal votes		231	1.9	+0.4
Turnout		11,892	95.2	+1.4
Two-party-preferred result
Liberal	John Herbert	7,692	66.0	+3.1
Labor	Vincent Kitson	3,969	34.0	−3.1
Liberal hold		Swing	+3.1	

=== Somerset ===
1963 Queensland state election: Somerset
Party	Candidate	Votes	%	±%
Country	Harold Richter	5,336	60.1	+5.0
Labor	John Walters	3,536	39.9	+20.9
Total formal votes		8,872	99.3	+0.7
Informal votes		60	0.7	−0.7
Turnout		8,932	95.8	+1.7
Country hold		Swing	N/A	

=== South Brisbane ===
1963 Queensland state election: South Brisbane
Party	Candidate	Votes	%	±%
Labor	Col Bennett	5,768	54.9	+11.0
Liberal	Gabrielle Horan	3,298	31.4	+4.2
Queensland Labor	Greg Kehoe	1,444	13.7	−15.2
Total formal votes		10,510	96.8	−1.4
Informal votes		344	3.2	+1.4
Turnout		10,854	91.7	+3.7
Two-party-preferred result
Labor	Col Bennett	6,037	57.4	
Liberal	Gabrielle Horan	4,473	42.6	
Labor hold		Swing	N/A	

=== South Coast ===
1963 Queensland state election: South Coast
Party	Candidate	Votes	%	±%
Country	Eric Gaven	7,306	77.5	+1.6
Labor	Irene Weir	1,817	19.3	−2.2
Queensland Labor	Douglas Schwede	308	3.3	+3.3
Total formal votes		9,431	98.7	+0.5
Informal votes		119	1.3	−0.5
Turnout		9,550	89.1	+1.7
Two-party-preferred result
Country	Eric Gaven	7,557	80.1	
Labor	Irene Weir	1,874	19.9	
Country hold		Swing	N/A	

=== Tablelands ===
1963 Queensland state election: Tablelands
Party	Candidate	Votes	%	±%
Labor	Edwin Wallis-Smith	3,281	51.6	+11.2
Country	Tom Gilmore	2,761	43.4	−9.4
Independent	Dino Bertoldo	204	3.2	+3.2
Queensland Labor	Leo McManus	116	1.8	−5.0
Total formal votes		6,362	96.6	−1.5
Informal votes		221	3.4	+1.5
Turnout		6,583	89.3	+1.3
Two-party-preferred result
Labor	Edwin Wallis-Smith	3,405	53.5	
Country	Tom Gilmore	2,957	46.5	
Labor gain from Country		Swing	N/A	

=== Toowong ===
1963 Queensland state election: Toowong
Party	Candidate	Votes	%	±%
Liberal	Alan Munro	7,586	69.1	−9.6
Labor	Leslie McGrath	2,630	24.0	+24.0
Queensland Labor	Brian O'Brien	765	7.0	−14.3
Total formal votes		10,981	98.8	+3.8
Informal votes		136	1.2	−3.8
Turnout		11,117	94.1	+2.4
Two-party-preferred result
Liberal	Alan Munro	8,209	74.8	
Labor	Leslie McGrath	2,772	25.2	
Liberal hold		Swing	N/A	

=== Toowoomba East ===
1963 Queensland state election: Toowoomba East
Party	Candidate	Votes	%	±%
Labor	Peter Wood	6,454	48.9	+2.5
Liberal	Mervyn Anderson	6,026	45.6	−1.6
Queensland Labor	Frank Mullins	726	5.5	−0.9
Total formal votes		13,206	99.1	−0.1
Informal votes		120	0.9	+0.1
Turnout		13,326	94.8	+1.5
Two-party-preferred result
Liberal	Mervyn Anderson	6,615	50.1	
Labor	Peter Wood	6,591	49.9	
Liberal hold		Swing	N/A	

=== Toowoomba West ===
1963 Queensland state election: Toowoomba West
Party	Candidate	Votes	%	±%
Labor	Jack Duggan	8,047	58.3	+3.0
Liberal	August Dietz	4,628	33.5	−2.0
Queensland Labor	Terry Morris	1,129	8.2	−1.0
Total formal votes		13,804	98.7	−0.6
Informal votes		184	1.3	+0.6
Turnout		13,988	94.6	+1.2
Two-party-preferred result
Labor	Jack Duggan	8,257	59.8	
Liberal	August Dietz	5,547	40.2	
Labor hold		Swing	N/A	

=== Townsville North ===
1963 Queensland state election: Townsville North
Party	Candidate	Votes	%	±%
Labor	Perc Tucker	6,196	48.4	+5.0
Liberal	Robert Bonnett	3,639	28.4	−5.7
Queensland Labor	Kiernan Dorney	2,896	22.6	+9.0
Independent	Alfred Reeves	66	0.5	+0.5
Total formal votes		12,797	98.7	+0.1
Informal votes		163	1.3	−0.1
Turnout		12,960	93.6	+0.7
Two-party-preferred result
Labor	Perc Tucker	6,806	53.2	
Liberal	Robert Bonnett	5,991	46.8	
Labor hold		Swing	N/A	

=== Townsville South ===
1963 Queensland state election: Townsville South
Party	Candidate	Votes	%	±%
NQ Labor	Tom Aikens	8,229	60.2	−6.6
Labor	Arthur Trower	5,450	39.8	+6.6
Total formal votes		13,679	99.0	+0.7
Informal votes		140	1.0	−0.7
Turnout		13,819	94.0	+0.7
NQ Labor hold		Swing	−6.6	

=== Warrego ===
1963 Queensland state election: Warrego
Party	Candidate	Votes	%	±%
Labor	John Dufficy	4,500	63.6	−3.1
Country	Michael Turner	2,573	36.4	+36.4
Total formal votes		7,073	98.5	+1.5
Informal votes		108	1.5	−1.5
Turnout		7,181	88.1	+0.7
Labor hold		Swing	N/A	

=== Warwick ===
1963 Queensland state election: Warwick
Party	Candidate	Votes	%	±%
Country	Otto Madsen	5,152	61.4	−2.5
Labor	Reggie Wenham	2,016	24.0	+2.6
Queensland Labor	Daniel Skehan	1,217	14.5	−0.2
Total formal votes		8,385	98.8	+0.1
Informal votes		105	1.2	−0.1
Turnout		8,490	95.8	+1.2
Two-party-preferred result
Country	Otto Madsen	6,143	73.3	
Labor	Reggie Wenham	2,242	26.7	
Country hold		Swing	N/A	

==== By-election ====
- This by-election was caused by the death of Otto Madsen. It was held on 19 October 1963.

1963 Warwick state by-election
Party	Candidate	Votes	%	±%
Country	David Cory	3,765	50.6	−10.8
Labor	Eric Barrett	2,413	32.4	+8.4
Independent	John Simpson	644	8.7	+8.7
Queensland Labor	Daniel Skehan	562	7.5	−7.0
Independent	Harry Aspinall	62	0.8	+0.8
Total formal votes		7,446		
Informal votes				
Turnout				
Country hold		Swing	N/A	

- Preferences were not distributed.

=== Wavell ===
1963 Queensland state election: Wavell
Party	Candidate	Votes	%	±%
Liberal	Alex Dewar	7,237	53.0	−0.7
Labor	Benjamin Harriss	5,024	36.8	+1.5
Queensland Labor	Vincent Bedsor	1,208	8.8	−2.2
Social Credit	Merv Goldstiver	184	1.4	+1.4
Total formal votes		13,653	98.6	−0.3
Informal votes		198	1.4	+0.3
Turnout		13,851	95.7	+0.8
Two-party-preferred result
Liberal	Alex Dewar	8,346	61.6	
Labor	Benjamin Harriss	5,307	38.4	
Liberal hold		Swing	N/A	

=== Whitsunday ===
1963 Queensland state election: Whitsunday
Party	Candidate	Votes	%	±%
Country	Ron Camm	4,468	56.9	+0.1
Labor	John Barry	3,384	43.1	+8.2
Total formal votes		7,852	98.9	0.0
Informal votes		84	1.1	0.0
Turnout		7,936	94.8	+2.4
Country hold		Swing	N/A	

=== Windsor ===
1963 Queensland state election: Windsor
Party	Candidate	Votes	%	±%
Liberal	Ray Smith	5,369	51.0	+1.1
Labor	George Georgouras	4,180	39.7	+4.0
Queensland Labor	Owen O'Donoghue	971	9.2	−5.1
Total formal votes		10,520	98.6	−0.6
Informal votes		148	1.4	+0.6
Turnout		10,668	95.3	+1.8
Two-party-preferred result
Liberal	Ray Smith	6,159	58.5	
Labor	George Georgouras	4,361	41.5	
Liberal hold		Swing	N/A	

=== Wynnum ===
1963 Queensland state election: Wynnum
Party	Candidate	Votes	%	±%
Labor	Bill Gunn	8,114	65.2	+1.8
Liberal	Oswald Brunner	3,797	30.5	+0.5
Queensland Labor	Kevin O'Regan	544	4.4	−2.3
Total formal votes		12,455	98.5	−0.4
Informal votes		187	1.5	+0.4
Turnout		12,642	95.1	+2.4
Two-party-preferred result
Labor	Bill Gunn	8,215	66.0	
Liberal	Oswald Brunner	4,240	34.0	
Labor hold		Swing	N/A	

=== Yeronga ===
1963 Queensland state election: Yeronga
Party	Candidate	Votes	%	±%
Liberal	Winston Noble	5,621	52.2	+0.8
Labor	Cyril Cusack	3,970	36.9	−0.7
Queensland Labor	Mary Andrews	1,089	10.1	−0.9
Social Credit	Roy Phipps	81	0.8	+0.8
Total formal votes		10,761	98.5	−0.4
Informal votes		158	1.5	+0.4
Turnout		10,919	94.9	+1.0
Two-party-preferred result
Liberal	Winston Noble	6,452	60.0	
Labor	Cyril Cusack	4,309	40.0	
Liberal hold		Swing	N/A	

==== By-election ====
- This by-election was caused by the death of Winston Noble. It was held on 6 June 1964.

1964 Yeronga state by-election
Party	Candidate	Votes	%	±%
Liberal	Norm Lee	4,687	45.4	−6.7
Labor	John Toll	4,522	43.8	+6.9
Queensland Labor	John Lamberth	939	9.1	−1.0
Social Credit	Eric Allen	137	1.4	+0.6
Independent	Thomas Masterson	28	0.3	+0.3
Total formal votes		10,315		
Informal votes				
Turnout				
Two-party-preferred result
Liberal	Norm Lee	5,640	54.7	−5.3
Labor	John Toll	4,675	45.3	+5.3
Liberal hold		Swing	−5.3	

== See also ==
- 1963 Queensland state election
- Candidates of the Queensland state election, 1963
- Members of the Queensland Legislative Assembly, 1963-1966
