= Electoral results for the district of Toowong =

Queensland, Australia, district election results

This is a list of electoral results for the electoral district of Toowong in Queensland state elections.

== Members for Toowong ==
Member	Party	Term
Theodore Unmack		1888–1893
Matthew Reid	Labour	1893–1896
Thomas Finney	Ministerialist	1896–1900
Edward Macartney	Ministerialist	1900–1908
Richard John Cottell	Ministerialist	1908–1911
Edward Macartney	Liberal	1911–1918
Edward Macartney	National	1918–1920
James Maxwell	National	1920–1922
James Maxwell	United	1922–1925
James Maxwell	CPNP	1925–1938
Harry Massey	United Australia	1938–1944
Charles Wanstall	QPP	1944–1950
Alan Munro	Liberal	1950–1966
Charles Porter	Liberal	1966–1980
Ian Prentice	Liberal	1980–1983
Earle Bailey	National	1983–1986
Denver Beanland	Liberal	1986–1992

== Election results ==
=== Elections in the 1980s ===
1989 Queensland state election: Toowong
Party	Candidate	Votes	%	±%
Labor	Janelle Howe	7,964	44.9	+15.2
Liberal	Denver Beanland	7,421	41.8	+0.6
National	Rodney Hall	1,513	8.5	−20.6
Greens	Neil Kelly	856	4.8	+4.8
Total formal votes		17,754	98.0	−0.7
Informal votes		365	2.0	+0.7
Turnout		18,119	88.7	−0.5
Two-party-preferred result
Liberal	Denver Beanland	9,109	51.3	−17.1
Labor	Janelle Howe	8,645	48.7	+17.1
Liberal hold		Swing	−17.1	

1986 Queensland state election: Toowong
Party	Candidate	Votes	%	±%
Liberal	Denver Beanland	7,157	41.2	+11.7
Labor	Jonathan Ford	5,164	29.7	−6.0
National	Earle Bailey	5,062	29.1	−5.6
Total formal votes		17,383	98.7	
Informal votes		230	1.3	
Turnout		17,613	89.2	
Two-party-preferred result
Liberal	Denver Beanland	11,884	68.4	+68.4
Labor	Jonathan Ford	5,499	31.6	−15.6
Liberal gain from National		Swing	N/A	

1983 Queensland state election: Toowong
Party	Candidate	Votes	%	±%
Labor	Nigel Pennington	5,431	35.7	+8.3
National	Earle Bailey	5,284	34.7	+9.1
Liberal	Ian Prentice	4,489	29.5	−4.7
Total formal votes		15,204	99.0	+0.1
Informal votes		153	1.0	−0.1
Turnout		15,357	90.2	+4.8
Two-party-preferred result
National	Earle Bailey	8,392	55.2	+55.2
Labor	Nigel Pennington	6,812	44.8	+8.6
National gain from Liberal		Swing	N/A	

1980 Queensland state election: Toowong
Party	Candidate	Votes	%	±%
Liberal	Ian Prentice	5,024	34.2	−13.2
Labor	Gailene Harrison	4,030	27.4	−3.0
National	Peter Forrest	3,767	25.6	+25.6
Democrats	Michael West	1,882	12.8	−5.8
Total formal votes		14,703	98.9	0.0
Informal votes		159	1.1	0.0
Turnout		14,862	85.4	−4.0
Two-party-preferred result
Liberal	Ian Prentice	9,279	63.1	+4.4
Labor	Gailene Harrison	5,424	36.9	−4.4
Liberal hold		Swing	+4.4	

=== Elections in the 1970s ===
1977 Queensland state election: Toowong
Party	Candidate	Votes	%	±%
Liberal	Charles Porter	7,010	47.8	−20.8
Labor	Athol Kennedy	4,462	30.4	+2.6
Democrats	Michael West	2,732	18.6	+18.6
Progress	Gordon Oulsnam	462	3.2	+3.2
Total formal votes		14,666	98.9	
Informal votes		168	1.1	
Turnout		14,834	89.4	
Two-party-preferred result
Liberal	Charles Porter	8,609	58.7	−12.5
Labor	Athol Kennedy	6,057	41.3	+12.5
Liberal hold		Swing	−12.5	

1974 Queensland state election: Toowong
Party	Candidate	Votes	%	±%
Liberal	Charles Porter	8,950	68.6	+13.0
Labor	Donald Dignam	3,621	27.8	−7.7
Queensland Labor	Brian O'Brien	474	3.6	−5.3
Total formal votes		13,045	98.8	+0.1
Informal votes		164	1.2	−0.1
Turnout		13,209	86.8	−5.3
Two-party-preferred result
Liberal	Charles Porter	9,344	71.6	+8.6
Labor	Donald Dignam	3,701	28.4	−8.6
Liberal hold		Swing	+8.6	

1972 Queensland state election: Toowong
Party	Candidate	Votes	%	±%
Liberal	Charles Porter	6,248	55.6	−3.5
Labor	Donald Dignam	3,987	35.5	+4.7
Queensland Labor	Brian O'Brien	996	8.9	−1.2
Total formal votes		11,231	98.7	
Informal votes		150	1.3	
Turnout		11,381	92.1	
Two-party-preferred result
Liberal	Charles Porter	7,076	63.0	−4.3
Labor	Donald Dignam	4,155	37.0	+4.3
Liberal hold		Swing	−4.3	

=== Elections in the 1960s ===
1969 Queensland state election: Toowong
Party	Candidate	Votes	%	±%
Liberal	Charles Porter	6,566	59.1	−6.2
Labor	Ian Hinckfuss	3,417	30.8	+5.4
Queensland Labor	Brian O'Brien	1,117	10.1	+0.8
Total formal votes		11,100	98.5	+0.1
Informal votes		174	1.5	−0.1
Turnout		11,274	89.0	−3.8
Two-party-preferred result
Liberal	Charles Porter	7,475	67.3	−5.8
Labor	Ian Hinckfuss	3,625	32.7	+5.8
Liberal hold		Swing	−5.8	

1966 Queensland state election: Toowong
Party	Candidate	Votes	%	±%
Liberal	Charles Porter	7,254	65.3	−3.8
Labor	Douglas Wallace	2,825	25.4	+1.4
Queensland Labor	Brian O'Brien	1,033	9.3	+2.3
Total formal votes		11,112	98.4	−0.4
Informal votes		183	1.6	+0.4
Turnout		11,295	92.8	−1.3
Two-party-preferred result
Liberal	Charles Porter	8,124	73.1	−1.7
Labor	Douglas Wallace	2,988	26.9	+1.7
Liberal hold		Swing	−1.7	

1963 Queensland state election: Toowong
Party	Candidate	Votes	%	±%
Liberal	Alan Munro	7,586	69.1	−9.6
Labor	Leslie McGrath	2,630	24.0	+24.0
Queensland Labor	Brian O'Brien	765	7.0	−14.3
Total formal votes		10,981	98.8	+3.8
Informal votes		136	1.2	−3.8
Turnout		11,117	94.1	+2.4
Two-party-preferred result
Liberal	Alan Munro	8,209	74.8	
Labor	Leslie McGrath	2,772	25.2	
Liberal hold		Swing	N/A	

1960 Queensland state election: Toowong
Party	Candidate	Votes	%	±%
Liberal	Alan Munro	8,200	78.7	
Queensland Labor	Roger Judge	2,222	21.3	
Total formal votes		10,422	95.0	
Informal votes		553	5.0	
Turnout		10,975	91.7	
Liberal hold		Swing		

=== Elections in the 1950s ===
1957 Queensland state election: Toowong
Party	Candidate	Votes	%	±%
Liberal	Alan Munro	unopposed		
Liberal hold		Swing		

1956 Queensland state election: Toowong
Party	Candidate	Votes	%	±%
Liberal	Alan Munro	unopposed		
Liberal hold		Swing		

1953 Queensland state election: Toowong
Party	Candidate	Votes	%	±%
Liberal	Alan Munro	7,135	62.8	−4.2
Labor	Frank Venables	4,234	37.2	+4.2
Total formal votes		11,369	98.8	−0.3
Informal votes		136	1.2	+0.3
Turnout		11,505	94.0	+0.6
Liberal hold		Swing	−4.2	

1950 Queensland state election: Toowong
Party	Candidate	Votes	%	±%
Liberal	Alan Munro	7,101	67.0	
Labor	Frank Venables	3,494	33.0	
Total formal votes		10,595	99.1	
Informal votes		94	0.9	
Turnout		10,689	93.4	
Liberal hold		Swing		

=== Elections in the 1940s ===
1947 Queensland state election: Toowong
Party	Candidate	Votes	%	±%
People's Party	Charles Wanstall	8,375	70.2	+13.6
Labor	Frank Venables	3,549	29.8	+29.8
Total formal votes		11,924	98.9	+0.4
Informal votes		136	1.1	−0.4
Turnout		12,060	91.9	+0.8
People's Party hold		Swing	N/A	

1944 Queensland state election: Toowong
Party	Candidate	Votes	%	±%
People's Party	Charles Wanstall	6,047	56.6	−7.2
Independent	Tom Laws	2,437	22.3	+22.3
Independent	Harry Massey	1,881	17.6	+17.6
Independent	Harold Jiear	325	3.0	+3.0
Total formal votes		10,690	98.5	+0.1
Informal votes		166	1.5	−0.1
Turnout		10,856	91.1	−2.0
People's Party hold		Swing	N/A	

1941 Queensland state election: Toowong
Party	Candidate	Votes	%	±%
United Australia	Harry Massey	6,403	63.8	+38.4
Labor	Tom Laws	3,632	36.2	+10.2
Total formal votes		10,037	98.4	−0.3
Informal votes		158	1.6	+0.3
Turnout		10,195	93.1	−1.8
United Australia gain from Ind. United Australia		Swing	N/A	

- Massey was elected as an Independent at the previous election.

=== Elections in the 1930s ===
1938 Queensland state election: Toowong
Party	Candidate	Votes	%	±%
Ind. United Australia	Harry Massey	3,137	31.9	+31.9
Labor	John O'Shea	2,561	26.0	−13.1
United Australia	Nicholas Lockyer	2,499	25.4	−27.1
Protestant Labour	Joseph West	1,639	16.7	+16.7
Total formal votes		9,836	98.7	+0.1
Informal votes		125	1.3	−0.1
Turnout		9,961	94.9	0.0
Two-candidate-preferred result
Ind. United Australia	Harry Massey	5,264	66.2	
Labor	John O'Shea	2,690	33.8	
Ind. United Australia gain from United Australia		Swing	N/A	

1935 Queensland state election: Toowong
Party	Candidate	Votes	%	±%
CPNP	James Maxwell	4,781	52.5	
Labor	Edward Turner	3,558	39.1	
Social Credit	Charles Hallick	766	8.4	
Total formal votes		9,105	98.6	
Informal votes		129	1.4	
Turnout		9,234	94.9	
CPNP hold		Swing		

- Preferences were not distributed.

1932 Queensland state election: Toowong
Party	Candidate	Votes	%	±%
CPNP	James Maxwell	5,354	58.9	
Labor	Edward Turner	3,105	34.2	
Queensland Party	James Trotter	428	4.7	
Independent	Charles Graves	196	2.2	
Total formal votes		9,083	99.3	
Informal votes		61	0.7	
Turnout		9,144	94.0	
CPNP hold		Swing		

- Preferences were not distributed.

=== Elections in the 1920s ===
1929 Queensland state election: Toowong
Party	Candidate	Votes	%	±%
CPNP	James Maxwell	6,336	73.8	+5.8
Labor	Leslie Day	2,255	26.3	−5.8
Total formal votes		8,591	99.1	−0.3
Informal votes		74	0.9	+0.3
Turnout		8,665	91.4	+0.9
CPNP hold		Swing	+5.8	

1926 Queensland state election: Toowong
Party	Candidate	Votes	%	±%
CPNP	James Maxwell	4,588	68.0	−1.7
Labor	William Stock	2,583	32.0	+1.7
Total formal votes		8,071	99.4	0.0
Informal votes		51	0.6	0.0
Turnout		8,122	90.5	+3.2
CPNP hold		Swing	−1.7	

1923 Queensland state election: Toowong
Party	Candidate	Votes	%	±%
United	James Maxwell	4,855	69.7	−2.2
Labor	Robert Easton	2,112	30.3	+2.2
Total formal votes		6,967	99.4	0.0
Informal votes		42	0.6	0.0
Turnout		7,009	87.3	+1.9
United hold		Swing	−2.2	

1920 Queensland state election: Toowong
Party	Candidate	Votes	%	±%
National	James Maxwell	5,551	71.9	+4.2
Labor	William McCosker	2,164	28.1	−4.2
Total formal votes		7,715	99.4	−0.1
Informal votes		48	0.6	+0.1
Turnout		7,763	85.4	+0.5
National hold		Swing	+4.2	

=== Elections in the 1910s ===
1918 Queensland state election: Toowong
Party	Candidate	Votes	%	±%
National	Edward Macartney	4,610	67.7	+8.1
Labor	William McCosker	2,201	32.3	−8.1
Total formal votes		6,811	99.5	−0.1
Informal votes		37	0.5	+0.1
Turnout		6,848	84.9	−6.8
National hold		Swing	+8.1	

1915 Queensland state election: Toowong
Party	Candidate	Votes	%	±%
Liberal	Edward Macartney	3,376	59.6	−10.9
Labor	Arthur Lilley	2,284	40.4	+10.9
Total formal votes		5,660	99.6	−0.2
Informal votes		22	0.4	+0.2
Turnout		5,682	91.7	+10.5
Liberal hold		Swing	−10.9	

1912 Queensland state election: Toowong
Party	Candidate	Votes	%	±%
Liberal	Edward Macartney	2,734	70.5	
Labor	Lewis McDonald	1,145	29.5	
Total formal votes		3,879	99.8	
Informal votes		9	0.2	
Turnout		3,888	81.2	
Liberal hold		Swing		
