= Electoral results for the district of Wavell =

Queensland, Australia, district election results

This is a list of electoral results for the electoral district of Wavell in Queensland state elections.

== Members for Wavell ==
Member	Party	Term
Alex Dewar	Liberal Party	1960–1968
Alex Dewar	Independent	1968–1969
Arthur Crawford	Liberal Party	1969–1977
Brian Austin	Liberal Party	1977–1983
Brian Austin	National Party	1983–1986

== Election results ==
=== Elections in the 1980s ===
1983 Queensland state election: Wavell
Party	Candidate	Votes	%	±%
Liberal	Brian Austin	7,208	51.3	−5.6
Labor	Christopher Begley	6,848	48.7	+5.6
Total formal votes		14,056	98.3	+0.2
Informal votes		239	1.7	−0.2
Turnout		14,295	92.6	+3.8
Liberal hold		Swing	−5.6	

1980 Queensland state election: Wavell
Party	Candidate	Votes	%	±%
Liberal	Brian Austin	7,960	56.9	+23.5
Labor	Jack Geran	6,020	43.1	−2.3
Total formal votes		13,980	98.1	−0.7
Informal votes		14,253	88.8	−3.9
Liberal hold		Swing	+4.1	

=== Elections in the 1970s ===
1977 Queensland state election: Wavell
Party	Candidate	Votes	%	±%
Labor	Jack Geran	6,738	45.4	+11.4
Liberal	Brian Austin	4,961	33.4	−29.2
National	Charles Mortensen	2,777	18.7	+18.7
Progress	Barry Smith	368	2.5	+2.5
Total formal votes		14,844	98.8	
Informal votes		183	1.2	
Turnout		15,027	92.7	
Two-party-preferred result
Liberal	Brian Austin	7,842	52.8	−11.3
Labor	Jack Geran	7,002	47.2	+11.3
Liberal hold		Swing	−11.3	

1974 Queensland state election: Wavell
Party	Candidate	Votes	%	±%
Liberal	Arthur Crawford	8,388	62.6	+18.1
Labor	Jack Geran	4,554	34.0	−13.0
Queensland Labor	Mervyn Eunson	465	3.5	−5.0
Total formal votes		13,407	99.0	−0.1
Informal votes		137	1.0	+0.1
Turnout		13,544	91.7	−2.8
Two-party-preferred result
Liberal	Arthur Crawford	8,774	65.4	+13.2
Labor	Jack Geran	4,633	34.6	−13.2
Liberal hold		Swing	+13.2	

1972 Queensland state election: Wavell
Party	Candidate	Votes	%	±%
Labor	Herbert Bromley	5,661	47.0	+9.5
Liberal	Arthur Crawford	5,351	44.5	+15.1
Queensland Labor	Peter Flanagan	1,024	8.5	+0.7
Total formal votes		12,036	99.1	
Informal votes		103	0.9	
Turnout		12,139	94.5	
Two-party-preferred result
Liberal	Arthur Crawford	6,279	52.2	−2.7
Labor	Herbert Bromley	5,757	47.8	+2.7
Liberal hold		Swing	−2.7	

=== Elections in the 1960s ===
1969 Queensland state election: Wavell
Party	Candidate	Votes	%	±%
Labor	Herbert Bromley	5,562	37.5	−3.7
Liberal	Arthur Crawford	4,360	29.4	−21.0
Independent	Alex Dewar	3,765	25.4	+25.4
Queensland Labor	Rogers Judge	1,158	7.8	+0.5
Total formal votes		14,845	99.0	+0.5
Informal votes		154	1.0	−0.5
Turnout		14,999	94.0	−0.8
Two-party-preferred result
Liberal	Arthur Crawford	8,131	54.8	−2.1
Labor	Herbert Bromley	6,714	45.2	+2.1
Liberal hold		Swing	−2.1	

1966 Queensland state election: Wavell
Party	Candidate	Votes	%	±%
Liberal	Alex Dewar	7,209	50.4	−2.6
Labor	Herbert Bromley	5,895	41.2	+4.4
Queensland Labor	Thomas Grundy	1,046	7.3	−1.6
Social Credit	Mervyn Goldstiver	113	0.8	−0.6
Independent	Desmond Fulton	51	0.4	+0.4
Total formal votes		14,314	98.5	−0.1
Informal votes		222	1.5	+0.1
Turnout		14,536	94.8	−0.9
Two-party-preferred result
Liberal	Alex Dewar	8,142	56.9	−4.7
Labor	Herbert Bromley	6,172	43.1	+4.7
Liberal hold		Swing	−4.7	

1963 Queensland state election: Wavell
Party	Candidate	Votes	%	±%
Liberal	Alex Dewar	7,237	53.0	−0.7
Labor	Benjamin Harriss	5,024	36.8	+1.5
Queensland Labor	Vincent Bedsor	1,208	8.8	−2.2
Social Credit	Merv Goldstiver	184	1.4	+1.4
Total formal votes		13,653	98.6	−0.3
Informal votes		198	1.4	+0.3
Turnout		13,851	95.7	+0.8
Two-party-preferred result
Liberal	Alex Dewar	8,346	61.6	
Labor	Benjamin Harriss	5,307	38.4	
Liberal hold		Swing	N/A	

1960 Queensland state election: Wavell
Party	Candidate	Votes	%	±%
Liberal	Alex Dewar	7,134	53.7	
Labor	Benjamin Harriss	4,696	35.3	
Queensland Labor	Kevin O'Dea	1,459	11.0	
Total formal votes		13,289	98.9	
Informal votes		144	1.1	
Turnout		13,433	94.9	
Liberal win		(new seat)		
