= Kenneth Morris (politician) =

Australian politician

Sir Kenneth Morris KBE, CMG
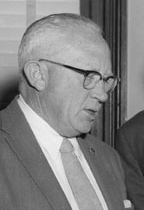

Senator for Queensland
- In office 30 November 1963 – 30 June 1968
- Preceded by: George Whiteside

17th Deputy Premier of Queensland
- In office 3 August 1957 – 26 September 1962
- Premier: Frank Nicklin
- Preceded by: Ted Walsh
- Succeeded by: Alan Munro

Minister for Labour and Industry
- In office 12 August 1957 – 28 December 1962
- Premier: Frank Nicklin
- Preceded by: Arthur Jones
- Succeeded by: Alex Dewar

Deputy Leader of the Opposition in Queensland
- In office 12 August 1954 – 3 August 1957
- Leader: Frank Nicklin
- Preceded by: Thomas Hiley
- Succeeded by: Eric Lloyd

Leader of the Queensland Liberal Party Elections: 1956, 1957, 1960
- In office 12 August 1954 – 26 September 1962
- Deputy: Alan Munro
- Preceded by: Thomas Hiley
- Succeeded by: Alan Munro

Deputy Leader of the Queensland Liberal Party
- In office 31 May 1950 – 12 August 1954
- Leader: Thomas Hiley
- Preceded by: Charles Wanstall
- Succeeded by: Alan Munro

Member of the Queensland Legislative Assembly for Mount Coot-tha Enoggera (1944–1950)
- In office 15 April 1944 – 1 June 1963
- Preceded by: George Taylor
- Succeeded by: Bill Lickiss

Personal details
- Born: 12 October 1903 Brisbane, Queensland
- Died: 1 June 1978 (aged 74) Chermside, Brisbane, Queensland
- Party: Liberal Party
- Other political affiliations: Queensland People's Party (1944–1949)
- Spouse: Ettie Louise Dunlop
- Children: Barbara Morris, David Morris, Grant Morris, Bruce Morris
- Education: Brisbane Grammar School
- Occupation: Shoe/Boot Manufacturer, Grazier

Military service
- Branch/service: Australian Army
- Years of service: 1939–1944
- Rank: Major

Sir Kenneth James Morris KBE, CMG (22 October 1903 – 1 June 1978) was an Australian politician who served as the Deputy Premier of Queensland from 1957 until 1962.

== Early life ==
Born in Brisbane, he was educated at Brisbane Grammar School before becoming the director of his family's boot manufacturing firm. In 1931, he married Ettie Louise Dunlop.

Morris served in the military 1939–1944, in Britain (1940), Tobruk (1941) and Egypt (1942); rising to the rank of Major.

== Political career ==
A founding member of the Liberal Party in Queensland, he was elected to the Legislative Assembly of Queensland in 1944 as the member for Enoggera, transferring to Mount Coot-tha in 1950. Morris was state Leader of the Liberal Party 1954–1962, Deputy Premier 1957–1962, and Minister for Labour and Industry 1957–1962.

In Queensland, unlike in the rest of Australia, Morris's Liberals were the junior partner in the non-Labor Coalition. Thus, when the Coalition won government for the first time in 25 years and only the second time in 42 years, Morris became deputy premier under Country Party leader and Premier Frank Nicklin. Morris was known as a hard-nosed, aggressive man, in sharp contrast to the easygoing Nicklin. He was known to push Nicklin to consider his submissions first even though longstanding practice called for cabinet submissions to be considered in order of receipt. Despite this, Morris had a strong working relationship with Nicklin.

He stepped down as leader in August 1962 and as Deputy Premier in September for health reasons, and moved to Cooktown where he cultivated legume seed. In December 1963, he won a special election for a Senate seat in Queensland, filling the vacancy caused by the death of Labor Senator Max Poulter and to which George Whiteside had been appointed. Morris defeated Whiteside 50.6% to 49.4%. He retired in 1967.

== Personal life ==
Morris died in 1978 at Chermside, Brisbane.

Parliament of Queensland
| Preceded by George Taylor | Member for Enoggera; 1944–1950 | Abolished |
| New seat | Member for Mount Coot-tha; 1950–1963 | Succeeded by Bill Lickiss |
