= 1966 Queensland state election =

← 1963	28 May 1966	1969 →

All 78 seats in the Legislative Assembly of Queensland 40 Assembly seats were needed for a majority
- Turnout: 93.27 (▼0.02 pp)
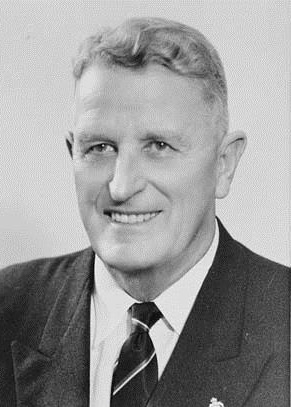

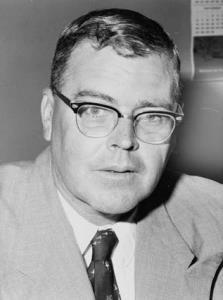
	First party	Second party	Third party
			QLP
Leader	Frank Nicklin	Jack Duggan	No leader
Party	Country–Liberal Coalition	Labor	Queensland Labor
Leader since	21 May 1941	18 August 1958
Leader's seat	Landsborough	Toowoomba West
Last election	46 seats, 44.07%	26 seats, 43.83%	1 seat, 7.23%
Seats won	47	26	1
Seat change	▲1	Steady	Steady
Popular vote	357,729	350,254	49,948
Percentage	44.77%	43.84%	6.25%
Swing	▲0.70	▲0.01	▼0.97
- Winning margin by electorate.
Premier before election
Frank Nicklin
Country–Liberal Coalition
Elected Premier
Frank Nicklin
Country–Liberal Coalition

Elections were held in the Australian state of Queensland on 28 May 1966 to elect the 78 members of the Legislative Assembly of Queensland.

The major parties contesting the election were the Country Party led by Premier Frank Nicklin in coalition the Liberal Party, the Labor Party led by Jack Duggan.

The Country-Liberal coalition won a fourth term in office at the election.

== Key dates ==
Date	Event
10 March 1966	The Legislative Assembly was prorogued until 26 April.
19 April 1966	The Legislative Assembly was dissolved.
19 April 1966	Writs were issued by the Governor, Alan Mansfield, to proceed with an election.
28 April 1966	Close of nominations.
28 May 1966	Polling day, between the hours of 8am and 6pm.
10 June 1966	The Nicklin Ministry was reconstituted.
25 June 1966	The writ was returned and the results formally declared.
1 July 1966	Deadline for return of the writs.
2 August 1966	Parliament resumed for business.

== Results ==
Queensland state election, 28 May 1966 Legislative Assembly << 1963–1969 >>
Enrolled voters	870,869				
Votes cast	812,235		Turnout	93.27	-0.02
Informal votes	13,262		Informal	1.63	+0.07
Summary of votes by party
Party	Primary votes	%	Swing	Seats	Change
Labor	350,254	43.84	+0.01	26	±0
Liberal	203,648	25.49	+1.73	20	±0
Country	154,081	19.28	–1.03	27	+1
Queensland Labor	49,948	6.25	–0.97	1	±0
Independent	38,001	4.76	+0.20	4	–1
Total	798,973			78	

Popular vote
Labor	43.84%
Liberal	25.49%
Country	19.28%
Democratic Labor	6.25%
Independents	4.76%

Seats
Country	34.62%
Labor	33.33%
Liberal	25.64%
Democratic Labor	1.28%
Independents	5.13%

== Seats changing hands ==
Seat	Pre-1966			Swing	Post-1966		
Seat	Party	Member	Margin	Swing	Margin	Member	Party
Fassifern	Independent Country	Alf Muller	7.7 v CP	N/A	20.1 v ALP	Alf Muller	Country
Hawthorne	Independent Labor	Bill Baxter*	3.0	–5.5	2.5	Bill Kaus	Liberal
Toowoomba East	Liberal	Mervyn Anderson	0.1	–5.4	5.3	Peter Wood	Labor

- Members listed in italics did not recontest their seats.
- The sitting Labor MP for Hawthorne, Bill Baxter, lost preselection as the Labor candidate. He was expelled from the ALP for running against the selected candidate Thomas Burton. Previous election figures are Labor v Liberal.

== Post-election pendulum ==
Government seats (47)
Marginal
Albert	Cec Carey	CP	0.2 v LIB
South Coast	Russ Hinze	CP	2.5 v LIB
Hawthorne	Bill Kaus	LIB	2.5
Mirani	Tom Newbery	CP	3.2
Logan	Dick Wood	CP	3.2
Murrumba	David Nicholson	CP	4.0
Bowen	Peter Delamothe	LIB	5.6
Whitsunday	Ron Camm	CP	5.7
Fairly safe
Windsor	Ray Smith	LIB	6.1
Ithaca	Col Miller	LIB	6.2
Chatsworth	Bill Hewitt	LIB	6.5
Rockhampton South	Rex Pilbeam	LIB	6.7
Wavell	Alex Dewar	LIB	6.9
Merthyr	Sam Ramsden	LIB	7.5
Kurilpa	Clive Hughes	LIB	8.1
Mulgrave	Roy Armstrong	CP	8.2
Nundah	William Knox	LIB	8.6
Redcliffe	Jim Houghton	CP	8.7
Yeronga	Norm Lee	LIB	9.3
Aspley	Fred Campbell	LIB	9.5
Safe
Cooroora	David Low	CP	10.0
Ashgrove	Douglas Tooth	LIB	11.2
Gregory	Wally Rae	CP	11.3
Greenslopes	Keith Hooper	LIB	12.6
Balonne	Eddie Beardmore	CP	12.7
Isis	Jack Pizzey	CP	12.8
Gympie	Max Hodges	CP	12.9
Mount Gravatt	Geoff Chinchen	LIB	13.3
Balonne	Claude Wharton	CP	13.6
Roma	William Ewan	CP	13.7
Callide	Vince Jones	CP	14.4
Flinders	Bill Longeran	CP	14.5
Somerset	Harold Richter	CP	14.9
Clayfield	John Murray	LIB	14.9
Warwick	David Cory	CP	15.5
Sherwood	John Herbert	LIB	16.6
Lockyer	Gordon Chalk	LIB	16.9
Mount Coot-tha	Bill Lickiss	LIB	17.0
Carnarvon	Henry McKechnie	CP	17.6
Hinchinbrook	John Row	CP	19.1
Very Safe
Fassifern	Alf Müller	CP	20.1
Landsborough	Frank Nicklin	CP	21.3
Toowong	Charles Porter	LIB	23.1
Barambah	Joh Bjelke-Petersen	CP	24.2
Condamine	Vic Sullivan	CP	27.3
Cunningham	Alan Fletcher	CP	30.5
Mackenzie	Nev Hewitt	CP	Unopp

Opposition seats (26)
Marginal
Ipswich West	Vi Jordan	ALP	0.9 v IND
Townsville North	Perc Tucker	ALP	2.7
Toowoomba East	Peter Wood	ALP	5.3
Fairly safe
Tablelands	Edwin Wallis-Smith	ALP	6.0
Wynnum	Ted Harris	ALP	7.0 v LIB
Brisbane	Johnno Mann	ALP	8.0 v LIB
Mourilyan	Peter Byrne	ALP	8.5
Norman	Fred Bromley	ALP	8.7 v LIB
Safe
Barcoo	Eugene O'Donnell	ALP	10.1
Belmont	Fred Newton	ALP	10.1 v LIB
Mackay	Fred Graham	ALP	11.1
Cairns	Ray Jones	ALP	11.6 v LIB
South Brisbane	Col Bennett	ALP	11.9 v LIB
Kedron	Eric Lloyd	ALP	11.9 v LIB
Baroona	Pat Hanlon	ALP	12.3 v LIB
Toowoomba West	Jack Duggan	ALP	13.5 v LIB
Sandgate	Harry Dean	ALP	14.0 v LIB
Maryborough	Horace Davies	ALP	14.4
Bulimba	Jack Houston	ALP	14.8 v LIB
Nudgee	Jack Melloy	ALP	14.9 v LIB
Rockhampton North	Merv Thackeray	ALP	16.7 v LIB
Burke	Alec Inch	ALP	19.0 v LIB
Salisbury	Doug Sherrington	ALP	19.3 v LIB
Very Safe
Port Curtis	Martin Hanson	ALP	21.5
Ipswich East	Jim Donald	ALP	22.8 v LIB
Warrego	John Dufficy	ALP	Unopp
Crossbench seats (5)
Bundaberg	Ted Walsh	IND	3.5 v ALP
Cook	Ted Walsh	IND	5.2 v ALP
Burdekin	Bunny Adair	IND	8.5 v LIB
Aubigny	Les Diplock	DLP	12.6 v CP
Townsville South	Tom Aikens	NQL	13.9 v ALP

== See also ==
- Members of the Queensland Legislative Assembly, 1963–1966
- Members of the Queensland Legislative Assembly, 1966–1969
- Candidates of the Queensland state election, 1966
- Nicklin Ministry
