= Electoral results for the district of Coorparoo =

Queensland, Australia, district election results

This is a list of electoral results for the electoral district of Coorparoo in Queensland state elections.

== Members for Coorparoo ==
Member	Party	Term
Thomas Hiley	Liberal	1950–1960

== Election results ==
=== Elections in the 1950s ===
1957 Queensland state election: Coorparoo
Party	Candidate	Votes	%	±%
Liberal	Thomas Hiley	8,543	70.6	+8.6
Labor	Bernard Ouston	3,559	29.4	−8.6
Total formal votes		12,102	97.4	−1.5
Informal votes		318	2.6	+1.5
Turnout		12,420	95.1	+0.6
Liberal hold		Swing	+8.6	

1956 Queensland state election: Coorparoo
Party	Candidate	Votes	%	±%
Liberal	Thomas Hiley	7,476	62.0	+4.5
Labor	Geoffrey Maher	4,588	38.0	−4.5
Total formal votes		12,064	98.9	−0.2
Informal votes		134	1.1	+0.2
Turnout		12,198	94.5	+0.5
Liberal hold		Swing	+4.5	

1953 Queensland state election: Coorparoo
Party	Candidate	Votes	%	±%
Liberal	Thomas Hiley	6,722	57.5	−5.5
Labor	Gerald Maher	4,970	42.5	+5.5
Total formal votes		11,692	99.1	+0.1
Informal votes		110	0.9	−0.1
Turnout		11,802	94.0	+0.7
Liberal hold		Swing	−5.5	

1950 Queensland state election: Coorparoo
Party	Candidate	Votes	%	±%
Liberal	Thomas Hiley	6,899	63.0	
Labor	Erle Wettemeyer	4,047	37.0	
Total formal votes		10,946	99.0	
Informal votes		115	1.0	
Turnout		11,061	93.3	
Liberal hold		Swing		
