= Eric Lloyd (politician) =

Australian politician and real estate agent

Deputy Leader of the Opposition in Queensland Deputy Leader of the Labor Party in Queensland
- In office 15 August 1957 – June 1966
- Leader: Les Wood; Jim Donald; Jack Duggan
- Preceded by: Kenneth Morris (Opposition); Felix Dittmer (Labor)
- Succeeded by: Jack Houston

Member of the Queensland Legislative Assembly for Kedron
- In office 14 April 1951 – 27 May 1972
- Preceded by: Bruce Pie
- Succeeded by: Seat abolished

Personal details
- Born: Eric Gayford Lloyd; 1 January 1918 Brisbane, Queensland, Australia
- Died: 3 June 2003 (aged 85) Peregian Beach, Queensland, Australia
- Party: Labor
- Spouse: Bridie Ross (m.1943)
- Education: State Commercial High School, Brisbane
- Occupation: Real estate agent, Public servant

Military service
- Branch/service: Royal Australian Air Force
- Years of service: 1940–1946
- Rank: Flight Lieutenant
- Unit: 458 Squadron; 32 Squadron
- Battles/wars: Tobruk
- Awards: Distinguished Flying Cross

Eric Gayford Lloyd (1 January 1918 – 3 June 2003) was a Real estate agent and member of the Queensland Legislative Assembly.

== Early life ==
Lloyd was born in Brisbane, Queensland, to parents George Henry Lloyd and his wife Edith Lloyd (née Gayford). He was educated at the State Commercial High School.

On leaving school he was a reporter with the State Reporting Bureau and in World War II he served in the RAAF (458 Squadron) and earning the rank of Flight Lieutenant. He was a navigator in the Battle of Tobruk and won the Distinguished Flying Cross for his efforts there.

== Political career ==
Lloyd, a member of the Labor, represented the seat of Kedron in the Queensland Legislative Assembly from the by-election of 1951 until his retirement from politics in 1972.

He was the Deputy Opposition Leader from 1957 until 1966. His wife, Bridie, acted in the roles of electorate secretary and election campaigner throughout his 21 years in parliament.

Following the 1966 election Lloyd became the subject of attacks from the extra-parliamentary wing of the Labor party, as well as within the caucus. As a result, party leader Jack Duggan supported Jack Houston in challenging Lloyd which he did successfully by 15 votes to 10.

== Personal life ==
On 8 August 1943 Lloyd married Bridie Ross and together had two sons. He died in June 2003 at Peregian Beach.

He was the founding vice-president of the Queensland 100 Social Bowls Club 1963–1967, a member of the Parliamentary Bowls Club, and a president and life member of the Gaythorne RSL and Services Club.

Parliament of Queensland
Preceded by Bruce Pie	Member for Kedron; 1951–1972	Abolished
