= Brian Austin =

Australian politician

Member of the Queensland Legislative Assembly for Wavell
- In office 12 November 1977 – 1 November 1986
- Preceded by: Arthur Crawford
- Succeeded by: Seat abolished

Member of the Queensland Legislative Assembly for Nicklin
- In office 1 November 1986 – 26 October 1989
- Preceded by: New seat
- Succeeded by: Bob King

Personal details
- Born: Brian Douglas Austin; 22 March 1943 (age 83) Cleveland, Queensland, Australia
- Party: National Party
- Other political affiliations: Liberal Party
- Spouse: Leonie McKenzie
- Education: University of Queensland
- Occupation: Civil Engineer

Brian Douglas Austin (born 22 March 1943) is an Australian politician and Minister of Health (1980–1983 and 1983 - 1986) and Minister for Finance and Minister Assisting the Premier and Treasurer (1987 - 1989) and who represented the state seat of Wavell for the Liberal Party (1977–1983) and then for the National Party (1983–1986). In 1983, Austin switched to the National Party (along with Don Lane, who was the Transport Minister, after Premier Joh Bjelke-Petersen lobbied several Liberals to cross the floor, thus enabling the National Party to form government with a very slim majority. Prior to their defection, the Nationals were one seat short of governing in their own right. At the 1986 Queensland state election, Austin became the first MP for the new Queensland electorate of Nicklin (1986–1989).

In 1987, Austin was one of three ministers who told Governor Walter Campbell that Bjelke-Petersen no longer had enough support to govern. That was a precursor to the caucus coup that saw Bjelke-Petersen deposed as premier later that year.

Austin was subsequently implicated in the corruption being investigated by Fitzgerald Inquiry and was forced to retire in 1989. He was convicted on 25 counts of misappropriating public funds, involving $8700 spent on private accommodation, travel and meals, and was sentenced to 15 months' jail.

In 2010, Brisbane's Courier-Mail reported that Austin was selling real estate in the exclusive Brisbane suburbs of Ascot, Hamilton and Clayfield.

== See also ==
- Don Lane (politician)
- Leisha Harvey

Political offices
Preceded by Lin Powell	Leader of the House of the Legislative Assembly of Queensland; 1988–1989	Succeeded by Neville Harper
Parliament of Queensland
Preceded by Arthur Crawford	Member for Wavell; 1977–1986	Abolished
New seat	Member for Nicklin; 1986–1989	Succeeded by Bob King
