= Jack Pizzey =

Australian politician (1911–1968)

The Honourable Jack Pizzey
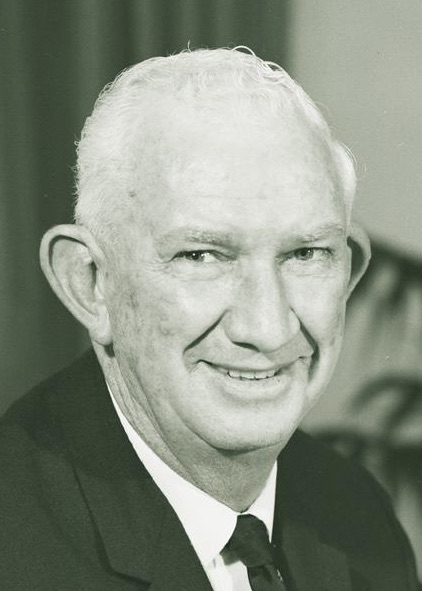

29th Premier of Queensland
- In office 17 January – 31 July 1968
- Monarch: Elizabeth II
- Governor: Alan Mansfield
- Deputy: Gordon Chalk
- Preceded by: Frank Nicklin
- Succeeded by: Gordon Chalk

Leader of the Country Party in Queensland
- In office 17 January – 31 July 1968
- Preceded by: Frank Nicklin
- Succeeded by: Joh Bjelke-Petersen

Member of the Legislative Assembly for Isis
- In office 29 April 1950 – 31 July 1968
- Preceded by: William Brand
- Succeeded by: Jim Blake

Personal details
- Born: Jack Charles Allan Pizzey; 2 February 1911 Childers, Queensland, Australia
- Died: 31 July 1968 (aged 57) Chermside, Brisbane, Queensland, Australia
- Party: Country
- Spouse: Mabel Audrey Kingston
- Children: John Pizzey; Judy Sale
- Education: University of Queensland
- Occupation: Teacher

Military service
- Allegiance: Australia
- Branch/service: Australian Army
- Years of service: 1940–1945
- Rank: Captain
- Unit: Australian Imperial Force, 5th Field Regiment
- Battles/wars: World War II

Jack Charles Allan Pizzey (2 February 1911 – 31 July 1968) was a Queensland Country Party politician. He was Premier of Queensland, in a coalition with the Liberal Party, from 17 January 1968 until his death on 31 July that year. To date, he is the most recent premier of an Australian state to die in office.

== Early life and sporting career ==
Pizzey was born in Childers, Queensland in 1911 to John Thomas Pizzey and his second wife Ellen Elliott (née Brand). He was educated at Childers State School, Maryborough Central Boys' School, and Bundaberg High School. He was a student teacher at Bundaberg South State School in 1927, and taught at the Childers State School (from 1932) and Leichhardt Street State School (from 1935).

Involved in tennis and rugby union as a youth, Pizzey excelled in cricket and was selected for the Queensland Colts cricket team in 1929. In 1931, he was selected to represent Queensland in the Sheffield Shield against Victoria, but the match was cancelled due to rain and Pizzey was unable to represent the state.

== Military career ==
On 15 July 1940, Pizzey was mobilised in the Citizens Military Force militia reserve unit as a gunner. Reaching the rank of Captain, he transferred to the Second Australian Imperial Force where he served during World War II in Australia as a quartermaster in the 5th Field Regiment until his discharge on 25 January 1945. As he was stationed in Australia, Pizzey continued his education, studying a Bachelor of Arts (1942) at the University of Queensland.

== Political career ==
Following his discharge from the AIF, Pizzey returned to teaching, and by 1946 was involved in administration at the Queensland Board of Adult Education. He resigned from the Department of Public Instruction in 1949 and became involved in representing the interests of sugar cane farmers as manager of the Childers Cane Farmers' Co-Operative and secretary to the Isis District Cane Growers' Executive. This representative role encouraged Pizzey to run for parliament, and in 1950 he won the safe Country Party seat of Isis in the Legislative Assembly of Queensland.

In 1957, a split in the Labor Party's Queensland branch brought down the Labor government, forcing an election. The Country–Liberal Party Coalition won a sweeping victory, its first in 22 years. With his educational background, Pizzey was appointed Minister for Education in Frank Nicklin's cabinet, and retained this job for more than a decade. He was also deputy leader of the Country Party, but he took other concurrent roles also: he held the portfolios of migration (1960–68), Aboriginal and Islander affairs (1962–68) and police (1962–68). As education minister, Pizzey presided over a period of unprecedented growth, particularly in secondary education, and played a key role in establishing Queensland's second university, James Cook University in Townsville in 1961. He was praised for his focus on secondary schooling, although his sweeping intervention in education matters was considered to have led to Brisbane's first teachers' strike in 1968.

In 1962, the University of Queensland awarded Pizzey an honorary doctorate of law for his contribution to education in Queensland.

Nicklin retired as Premier and party leader on 17 January 1968, and Pizzey succeeded him in both posts. Just over six months after his appointment, Pizzey died suddenly, in Brisbane, of a myocardial infarction. He was accorded a State funeral held at St John's Anglican Cathedral in Brisbane and cremated at Albany Creek Crematorium.

Pizzey was succeeded as premier for a week by the Leader of the Liberal Party and Deputy Premier, Gordon Chalk, until the Country Party chose its new leader, Joh Bjelke-Petersen.

== Jack Pizzey Cup ==
The Jack Pizzey Cup was donated by Pizzey in 1963 when he was Education Minister as a prize for a national schools championship tennis competition, replacing the Bruce Cup established in 1938 which then become a primary school competition prize. Although the Jack Pizzey Cup was intended to be a national competition, it was only contested between Queensland and New South Wales until 1978 when it was played in conjunction with the Federation Cup in Melbourne and become a national competition. As at 2018, the Pizzey Cup continues to be the national schools championship competition.

== Legacy ==
Pizzey is commemorated by the Pizzey Memorial Clock in Childers.

He is also commemorated by the Pizzey Park Sporting Complex which was established on a 26 hectares (64 acres) site in 1969 on the Gold Coast.

Political offices
| Preceded by Frank Nicklin | Premier of Queensland; 1968 | Succeeded by Gordon Chalk |
| Preceded by William Brand | Member for Isis; 1950–1968 | Succeeded by Jim Blake |
