= Gordon Chalk =

Australian politician (1913–1991)

The Honourable Sir Gordon Chalk KBE
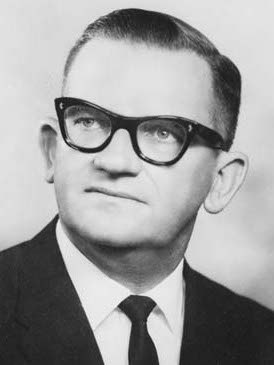
- Gordon Chalk in 1963

30th Premier of Queensland
- In office 1 August 1968 – 8 August 1968
- Monarch: Elizabeth II
- Governor: Sir Alan Mansfield
- Deputy: Joh Bjelke-Petersen
- Preceded by: Jack Pizzey
- Succeeded by: Joh Bjelke-Petersen

Leader of the Queensland Liberal Party Elections: 1966, 1969, 1972, 1974
- In office 23 December 1965 – 13 August 1976
- Deputy: Alex Dewar (1965–1967); Peter Delamothe (1967–1971); William Knox (1971–1976)
- Preceded by: Thomas Hiley
- Succeeded by: William Knox

35th Treasurer of Queensland
- In office 23 December 1965 – 13 August 1976
- Premier: Frank Nicklin; Jack Pizzey; Joh Bjelke-Petersen
- Preceded by: Thomas Hiley
- Succeeded by: William Knox

20th Deputy Premier of Queensland
- In office 8 August 1968 – 13 August 1976
- Premier: Joh Bjelke-Petersen
- Preceded by: Joh Bjelke-Petersen
- Succeeded by: William Knox
- In office 23 December 1965 – 1 August 1968
- Premier: Frank Nicklin; Jack Pizzey
- Preceded by: Thomas Hiley
- Succeeded by: Joh Bjelke-Petersen

Deputy Leader of the Queensland Liberal Party
- In office 28 January 1965 – 23 December 1965
- Leader: Thomas Hiley
- Preceded by: Thomas Hiley
- Succeeded by: Alex Dewar

Minister for Transport
- In office 12 August 1957 – 23 December 1965
- Premier: Frank Nicklin
- Preceded by: Thomas Moores
- Succeeded by: William Knox

Member of the Queensland Legislative Assembly for Lockyer East Toowoomba (1950–1976)
- In office 3 May 1947 – 12 August 1976
- Preceded by: Les Wood
- Succeeded by: Tony Bourke

Personal details
- Born: 16 May 1913 Rosewood, Queensland, Australia
- Died: 26 April 1991 (aged 77) Melbourne, Victoria, Australia
- Resting place: Uniting Church, Albert Street
- Party: Liberal (Note: Formerly called the Queensland People's Party, when Chalk joined the party.)
- Other political affiliations: Coalition (Note: Since the Liberal and National parties are in a coalition agreement since the foundation of the Liberal party, Chalk is a member of the Coalition via his ex-officio position within the Liberal Party leadership.)
- Spouse: Ellen Clare Grant (m. 1937)
- Occupation: Sales Representative, Newspaper employee

Sir Gordon William Wesley Chalk, KBE (16 May 1913 – 26 April 1991) was Premier of Queensland for a week, from 1 to 8 August 1968. He was the first and only Queensland Premier from the post-war Liberal Party.

== Early years ==
The only child of Queensland-born parents Samuel Chalk, butcher, and his wife, Sarah Elizabeth (née Wesley), "Chalkie", as he was nicknamed, was baptised in the Church of Christ (but as an adult gave his religion as Methodist). He attended Rosewood State, Marburg Rural, and Lockyer State High Schools.

== Career ==
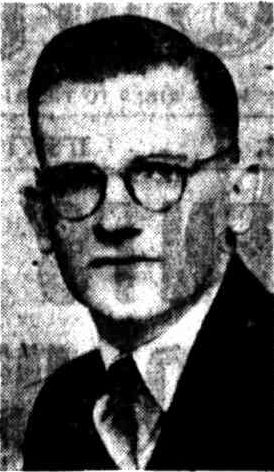
Gordon Chalk c. 1950

Chalk entered politics in 1947 having previously worked as a sales manager at the Toowoomba Foundry. In January 1965, he defeated Alex Dewar 11 votes to 9 to be elected as Deputy Liberal Leader, after Alan Munro resigned as leader and Deputy Premier.

On 23 December 1965, Chalk succeeded the retiring Sir Thomas Hiley as Leader of the Queensland Liberal Party, Deputy Premier and Treasurer in a coalition government with the Country Party led by Frank Nicklin. He did so by defeating Dewar a second time, 12 votes to 8. He continued in these roles when Jack Pizzey succeeded Nicklin as Premier on 17 January 1968.

Following the sudden death of Pizzey on 31 July 1968, the Governor Sir Alan Mansfield swore in Chalk as Premier on 1 August, pending the Country Party electing a new leader. They chose Joh Bjelke-Petersen, who succeeded Chalk after a week in office.

Chalk continued as Treasurer and Leader of the Liberal Party until his resignation from parliament in 1976.

=== Political positions ===
==== Seats held ====
- 1947–1950 East Toowoomba for the Queensland People's Party and the Liberal Party
- 1950–1976 Lockyer for the Liberal Party (resigned)

==== Ministerial positions ====
- Minister for Transport 12 August 1957 – 23 December 1965
- Treasurer 23 December 1965 – 13 August 1976
- Premier 1 August 1968 – 8 August 1968

== Honours ==
In the Queen's Birthday Honours of June 1971, he was made a Knight Commander of the Order of the British Empire (KBE).

== Personal life ==
Upon his death in 1991 Chalk was accorded a State funeral which was held at Albert Street Uniting Church and he was later cremated.

Parliament of Queensland
Preceded by Les Wood	Member for East Toowoomba; 1947–1950	Succeeded by Seat abolished
Preceded by Seat created	Member for Lockyer; 1950–1976	Succeeded by Tony Bourke
Political offices
Preceded by Thomas Hiley	Parliamentary Leader of the Liberal Party in Queensland; 1965–1976	Succeeded by William Knox
Preceded by Jack Pizzey	Premier of Queensland; 1968	Succeeded by Joh Bjelke-Petersen
Preceded by Alan Munro	Deputy Premier of Queensland; 1965–1976	Succeeded by William Knox
Preceded by Thomas Hiley	Treasurer of Queensland; 1965–1976	Succeeded by William Knox
Preceded by Thomas Moores	Minister for Transport; 1957–1965	Succeeded by William Knox
