= Charles Porter (Australian politician) =

Australian politician

The Honourable Charles Porter

Member of the Queensland Parliament for Toowong
- In office 28 May 1966 – 29 November 1980
- Preceded by: Sir Alan Munro
- Succeeded by: Ian Prentice

Personal details
- Born: Charles Robert Porter; 14 May 1910 Greenwich, England
- Died: 14 April 2004 (aged 93) Brisbane, Australia
- Party: Liberal Party
- Spouse: Joy Welch (m. 1931)
- Children: Chilla Porter; Warren Porter; Penny Porter; Christine Porter

Charles Robert Porter (14 May 1910 – 14 April 2004) was a British born Australian politician, author, playwright and broadcaster. He was the Liberal member for the Electoral District of Toowong in the Legislative Assembly of the Australian state of Queensland from 1966, and the Minister for Aboriginal and Island Affairs from 1977. Before his parliamentary career, Porter engaged in a career in radio and broadcasting, along with other creative pursuits.

Porter was the father of 1956 Olympic silver medallist Charles "Chilla" Porter. Chilla's son and Charles' grandson is Christian Porter, a former member of the Western Australian state parliament, former member of the federal parliament and former Attorney-General of Australia.

== Early life ==
Porter was born in London, England on 17 May 1910, to mother Evelyn Day and father George Henry, an insurance agent. He emigrated to Australia in September 1914, and was educated in Brisbane through primary and secondary school. At the age of 21, in May 1931, Porter married Joy Welch, and together they had two sons (Charles "Chilla" Porter and Warren Porter), and two daughters (Penny Porter and Christine Porter).

== Early career ==
Porter worked in a variety of different jobs before entering into his career in politics. After graduating from college, he began work as an assistant to an Undersecretary of the Home Secretary's department of Queensland. After this, he then worked as a journalist and freelance writer; he was involved in the television industry; he acted for the ABC and wrote numerous newspaper articles on a variety of subjects; he worked with advertising and merchandising industries; he was a state public servant; and a salesman.

He wrote a variety of radio plays which were broadcast in Australia, New Zealand, England, South Africa, Canada, France, Italy, Poland, Czechoslovakia, and Denmark. His play Variation on a Printing Press (Play Without a Name), described by Wireless Weekly in 1940 as “a pathological study using much experimental technique”, was featured in Best Australian One-act Plays, and was performed in both London and Brisbane.

Porter took an interest in radio just as Queensland's radio industry began to grow and develop, and he had a considerable role in its organisation.

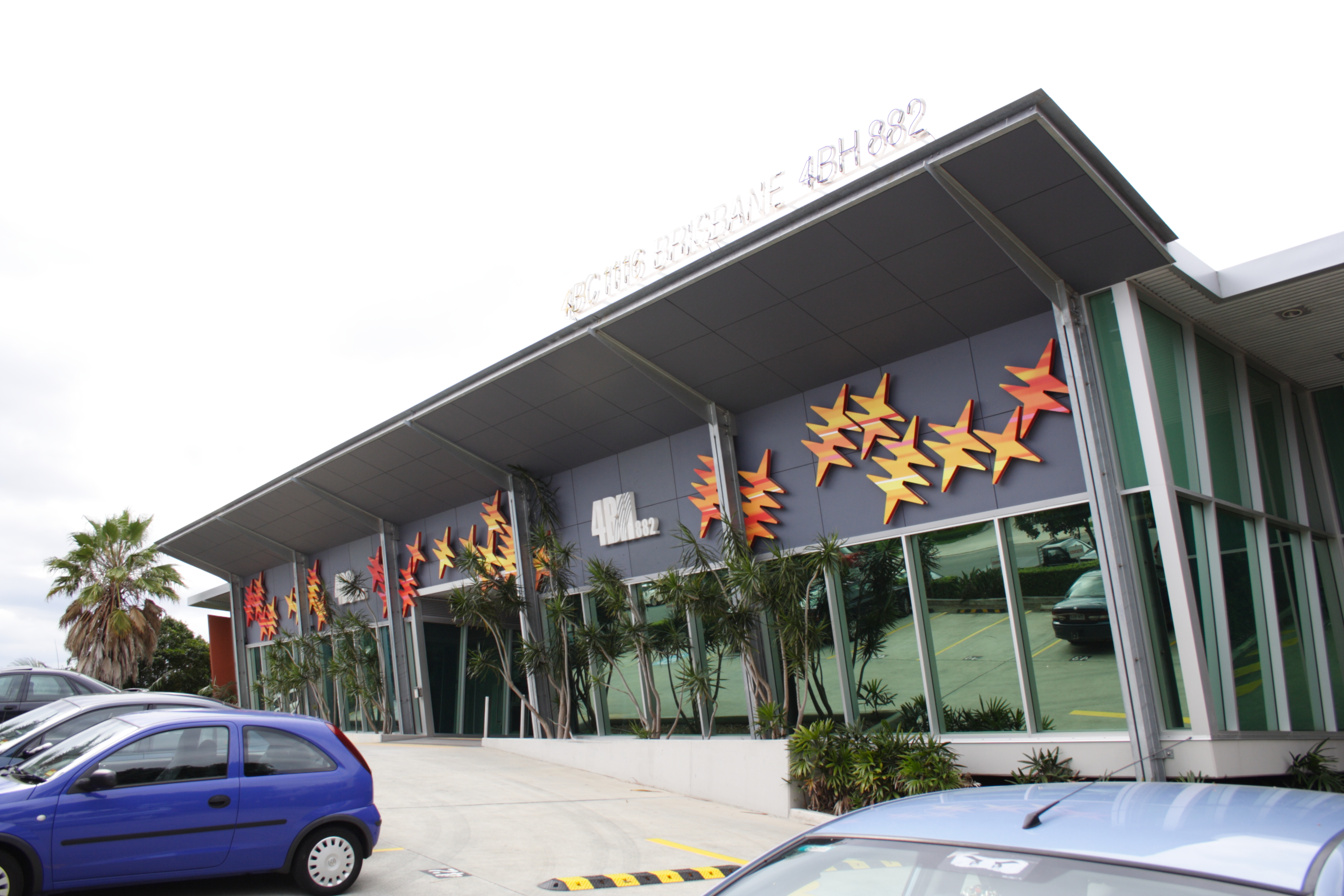
Radio station for 4BH and 4BC, Cannon Hill, Queensland.

Porter began his radio career in 1929 as a performer on the popular Queensland radio program ‘Cap and Bebe’ during children's sessions on radio station 4QG, then in 1930 began similar work with radio station 4BC. In 1931, he started work as a morning host with radio station 4BH under the pseudonym John Christopher. He is quoted speaking on the long hours he worked during this time, rising at “5am… and most days concluding with an evening shift that went to either 9 or 10:30”. He once called himself “complete radio Dog’s body” as he worked in so many different fields for the one station, including: “stock announcer, compere, commentator (once for an Australian Rules game that [he] had never seen before in [his] life and of which [he] knew absolutely nothing), playwright, producer, actor, women’s session announcer, children’s uncle, news analyst, advertising space salesman, and programme manager”. On top of this, for a number of years, he wrote a “weekly half-hour thriller whilst conducting [the] breakfast session” with 4BH.

== Political career ==
=== Queensland People's Party secretary (1944–1949) ===
Charles Porter helped to organise the Queensland People's Party (QPP) (now Liberal Party of Australia (Queensland Division)) in 1944. He took over from H.B. Taylor as QPP secretary in 1944, and was succeeded by V.L. Ockerby in 1949. He also acted as the state campaign director during this time. He continued to act as state campaign director after the QPP became the Queensland division of the Liberal Party, and performed his duties between 1949 and 1950, and again between 1957 and 1966.

=== Liberal Party "Ginger Group" ===
Porter was one of a few ministers to participate in the Ginger Group in the 1950s and 1960s: other notable members include ministers John Murray, Bill Lickiss, Clive Hughes, and Geoff Chinchen. Porter's activity in the Ginger Group included “vigorously attacking” the Liberal state executive after electing not to contest the by-election of the constituency of Landsborough in 1967, going against parliamentary tradition. He went on to support Peter Nelson Gracie as “an ‘unofficial’ candidate” for this by-election alongside another member of the Ginger Group, John Murray.

=== MLA for Toowong (1966–1980) ===
During the 1966 general election, Porter was elected to state parliament as MLA for Toowong. After the election, an informal caucus formed within the Liberal Party advocating for party leadership to “take a firmer line with the Country Party and ensure that Liberals became the senior coalition partner” – this faction was led by Porter and fellow Ginger Group member John Murray.

Later that same year, Porter criticised existing parliamentary procedures as “archaic”, specifically the tradition that opposition members cannot view proposed bills before debate and must respond to the bill “on the blind”. In 1969, Porter suggested procedural reform – this led to the formation of a committee, who recommended multiple reforms including: “introduction of questions without notice”; “an earlier start to the budget session”; “more sitting at night and on Fridays”; and “a rearrangement of sittings [so] country members could return to their electorates”. In 1970, Porter attempted to become a convention representative on the state executive but was blocked. In 1973, Porter led an industrial legislation committee. Porter moved to the ministry in 1974, joining fellow Ginger Group member Lickiss, with the premier's support, and later that year was appointed Chairman of the Select Committee on Punishment of Crimes of Violence in Queensland, and held this position throughout its proceedings. Following Gordon Chalk's retirement, Porter was considered as a replacement, but instead John Greenwood was nominated.

=== Minister for Aboriginal and Island Affairs (1977–1980) ===
In 1977, Porter was initiated into the Cabinet as the Minister of Aboriginal and Island Affairs as a part of Bjelke-Petersen's fifth ministry. Following Ron Camm's announcement of his resignation as minister and MLA of Whitsunday, Porter – along with members Fred Campbell and Nev Hewitt – elected not to recontest, receiving a valedictory motion at the session's closure. Later that same year, when asked to campaign against National ministers and endorse fellow Liberal members for highly contested seats, Porter refused, saying: “[al]though I support Liberalism this does not mean that I am prepared to work against a Cabinet colleague”. In 1978, He is also quoted criticising premier Bjelke-Petersen's statements on the right to protest, following Bjelke-Petersen's claim that applicants for march permits would not receive one as it was “government policy”, when in fact “over 90% of all permits were granted” between 1977 and 1978. By the end of 1980, Porter retired from his position in the cabinet, and was succeeded by Ken Tomkins as both the minister for Water Resources and Aboriginal and Island Affairs.

== Later life and death ==
Between 1958 and 1967, Porter served as the chairman of the Church of England Grammar School. He was also involved as either executive member or patron of many community organisations and sporting groups

Porter died on 14 April 2004 of natural causes. His funeral was held on 20 April 2004 at the Anglican Church Grammar School.

== Published and unpublished works ==
=== Plays ===
- The Secret Places
- Go Back, Napoleon
- Fire Below
- Dinner is Served
- Fury Rides Again
- Man of the House
- When Bugles Blow
- The Idiot
- Babes and Sucklings
- Blow, Little Wind
- The Bridge
- Child of Laughter
- There Once Was a Swagman
- Little Black Hen
- The Grass is Greener
- Prelude to Death
- Variations on a Printing Press (otherwise known as Play Without a Name)
- The Footsteps After
- Nellie Lacey and the Bushranger
- From Hills and Hollows

=== Books and other ===
- Broadcasting in Queensland (1961)
- The Gut Feeling (1981)

== Bibliography ==
- Arklay, Tracey and Wanna, John (2010). The Ayes Have It: The history of the Queensland Parliament, 1957–1989. Canberra: ANU E Press. pp. ch. 11.
- Beattie, Hon. P. D. (21 April 2004). "Motion of Condolence: Death of Hon. C. R. Porter" (PDF). Retrieved 28 September 2020.
- "Charles Porter". Aus Lit. |first= missing |last= (help)
- "Charles Porter – Brisbane Playwright – Latest Play to be Produced By ABC". Border Watch. 6 February 1940. Retrieved 24 September 2020.
- Crawford, Christopher (2009). "Civil Liberties, Bjelke-Petersen and a Bill of Rights: Lessons for Queensland" (PDF). Bond Law Review. 21 (1): 8.
- "Howlers and Handclaps". Wireless Weekly [Sydney]. 28 July 1933.
- [• https://trove.nla.gov.au/newspaper/article/192645886?searchTerm=charles%20porter%20radio "Radio Drama as Major Force: Views Of Charles Porter, Author of "Preludes to Death""] Check |url= value (help). Daily Examiner [Grafton]. 30 August 1938. Retrieved 30 August 2020. horizontal tab character in |url= at position 2 (help)
- Hughes, Colin A (1980). The Government of Queensland. Queensland: University of Queensland Press. pp. 38–161.
- "On Radio In Many Lands". Wireless Weekly. 26 October 1940. Retrieved 14 September 2020.
- "Parliamentary Select Committee on Punishment and Crimes of Violence in Queensland" (PDF). Queensland Legislative Assembly: Section 1. August 1974.
- Porter, Charles (1962). "Broadcasting In Queensland". Journal of the Royal Historical Society of Queensland. 6 (4): 750–759 – via The University of Queensland eSpace.
- Porter, Hon. Charles Robert. parliament.qld.gov.au. Parliament of Queensland. 24 September 2015. Retrieved 14 February 2016.
- Porter, Charles (1981). The Gut Feeling. Queensland: Boolarong Publications [Ascot].

Parliament of Queensland
| Preceded by Sir Alan Munro | Member for Toowong; 1966–1980 | Succeeded by Ian Prentice |
