= 13th Field Battery, Royal Australian Artillery =

13 Field Battery, Royal Australian Artillery
- Active: 1915 – present
- Country: Australia
- Branch: Australian Army
- Type: Artillery
- Role: close fire support
- Part of: 1st Field Regiment
- Garrison/HQ: Caboolture

13 Field Battery, Royal Australian Artillery was formed in New South Wales during September 1915 as the 13th Field Artillery Battery, part of 5th Field Artillery Brigade. Today 13 Field Battery is one of 4 batteries that make up the 1st Field Regiment, part of 7 Brigade.

== History ==
The entire 5th Field Brigade Australian Field Artillery was formed as part of 2nd Division Artillery at Fleurbiax, France (near Armentières) during World War I as the requirement for artillery increased on the Western Front battlefields. The Regiment was composed of 13th, 14th, 15th and 105th Batteries. The battery saw action in Egypt, Sinai and on the Western Front, the battery was disbanded at the end of the war.

In 1921 the Citizen's Army was reconstructed based on the 1st AIF framework. As part of this, 5th Field Regiment was re-raised at Kelvin Grove, Brisbane and consisted of 13th, 14th, 105th Field Batteries. In 1938, 15th Field Battery was raised, making the Regiment the same composition as in World War I.

During the Second World War, 5th Field Regiment amalgamated to form the newly raised 2nd/5th Field Regiment. This unit was later redesignated 2nd/1st Anti Tank Regiment. At the end of World War II this unit was disbanded. In 1955, 5th Field Regiment was reformed and was equipped with 25 Pounder Guns.

In 1960, 5th Field Regiment was re-organised as part of 1st Division. 13th Field Battery and Headquarter Battery were based at Kelvin Grove. In 1964 the battery changed to 105 mm L5 Pack Howitzers and later to the 105 mm M2A2.

On 1 July 1975, 5th Field Regiment amalgamated with 11th Field Regiment to form 5th/11th Field Regiment and as a consequence of the amalgamation 13th Field Battery was taken off the Army order of battle. In 1981, 13th Field Battery was re-raised at Kallangur as part of 5th/11th Field Regiment and was equipped with 105 mm L5 Pack Howitzers. The battery has close affiliation with the Pine Rivers Shire and Local citizens and was granted the Freedom of the Shire of Pine Rivers on 22 April 1989. In 1991, as part of 5th/11th Field Regiment 13th Field Battery was equipped with the 105 mm L119 Howitzer which is currently in service. On 23 April 1993 upon the separation of 5th/11th Field Regiment, 13th Field Battery, the only Battery of 5th Field Regiment became an independent Battery. On 1 May 1997, as result of the restructuring of the Army, 13th Field Battery came under command of 1st Field Regiment. On 4 March 2001 13th Field Battery was re-located to Caboolture.

Due to the operational requirements of 1st Field Regiment, 13th Field Battery was re-equipped with 155mm M198 Howitzers in January 2008. Having served with the M198 Howitzers for two years, 13 Field Battery was once again equipped with the L119 Hamel and oversaw the Army's retirement of the L119. In October 2011, it was decided that 13 Battery would transfer to 9RQR and provide indirect fire support as 13 Mortar Battery, to the 9th Battalion. In 2013 the battery, after being re-equipped with 81mm mortars, amalgamated with 41 Battery and was renamed the 5/11th Light Battery. The amalgamated battery now comes under the command of 9 Regiment Royal Australian Artillery and 13 Battery and 41 batteries have now been removed from the order of battle.
