= Arthur Crawford (politician) =

Australian politician

Dr Arthur Crawford

Member of the Queensland Legislative Assembly for Wavell
- In office 17 May 1969 – 12 November 1977
- Preceded by: Alex Dewar
- Succeeded by: Brian Austin

Personal details
- Born: Arthur Pinkerton Crawford; 22 September 1923 Caboolture, Queensland, Australia
- Died: 19 June 1995 (aged 71) Brisbane, Queensland, Australia
- Party: Liberal Party
- Spouses: Marion Chalk (m. 1947-1983); Gabrielle Louise Smith (m. 1984)
- Education: University of Queensland
- Occupation: Surgeon

Arthur Pinkerton Crawford (22 September 1923 – 19 June 1995) was a member of the Queensland Legislative Assembly.

== Biography ==
Crawford was born in Caboolture, Queensland, the son of Andrew Pinkerton Crawford and his wife Lilian Mary (née Donnelly). He was educated at Eagle Junction State School before attending the Brisbane Church of England Grammar School. At the age of ten he was confined to bed as a result of polio. He was a Bachelor of Science and Master of Science at the University of Queensland and then was a Post Graduate at the Australian College of Surgeons.

On graduation he became a surgical specialist and general practitioner. He was a surgeon to Australian Forces in Vietnam, in 1967-1968 and a lecturer at the Medical School of the University of Queensland. Crawford was also a director of Sanders Chemicals Ltd.

On 6 December 1947, he married Marion Chalk and together had one son and two daughters. He and Marion were divorced in 1983 before he remarried on 16 March 1984 at The Gap, Brisbane, to Gabrielle Louise Smith, a registered nurse. He died in June 1995 and was cremated at the Albany Creek Crematorium.

== Public life ==
At the 1969 Queensland state elections, Crawford won the seat of Wavell, and held it until his retirement from politics in 1977.

He was a member of Council of Presbyterian and Methodist Schools Association from 1966 and the Autistic Children's Association from 1970. Crawford was also President of the Right to Life Association (Queensland) from 1971 to 1977 and a councilor for the Family Planning Association.

Parliament of Queensland
Preceded by Alex Dewar	Member for Wavell; 1969–1977	Succeeded by Brian Austin
