= Thomas Hiley =

Australian politician (1905–1990)

Sir Thomas Hiley
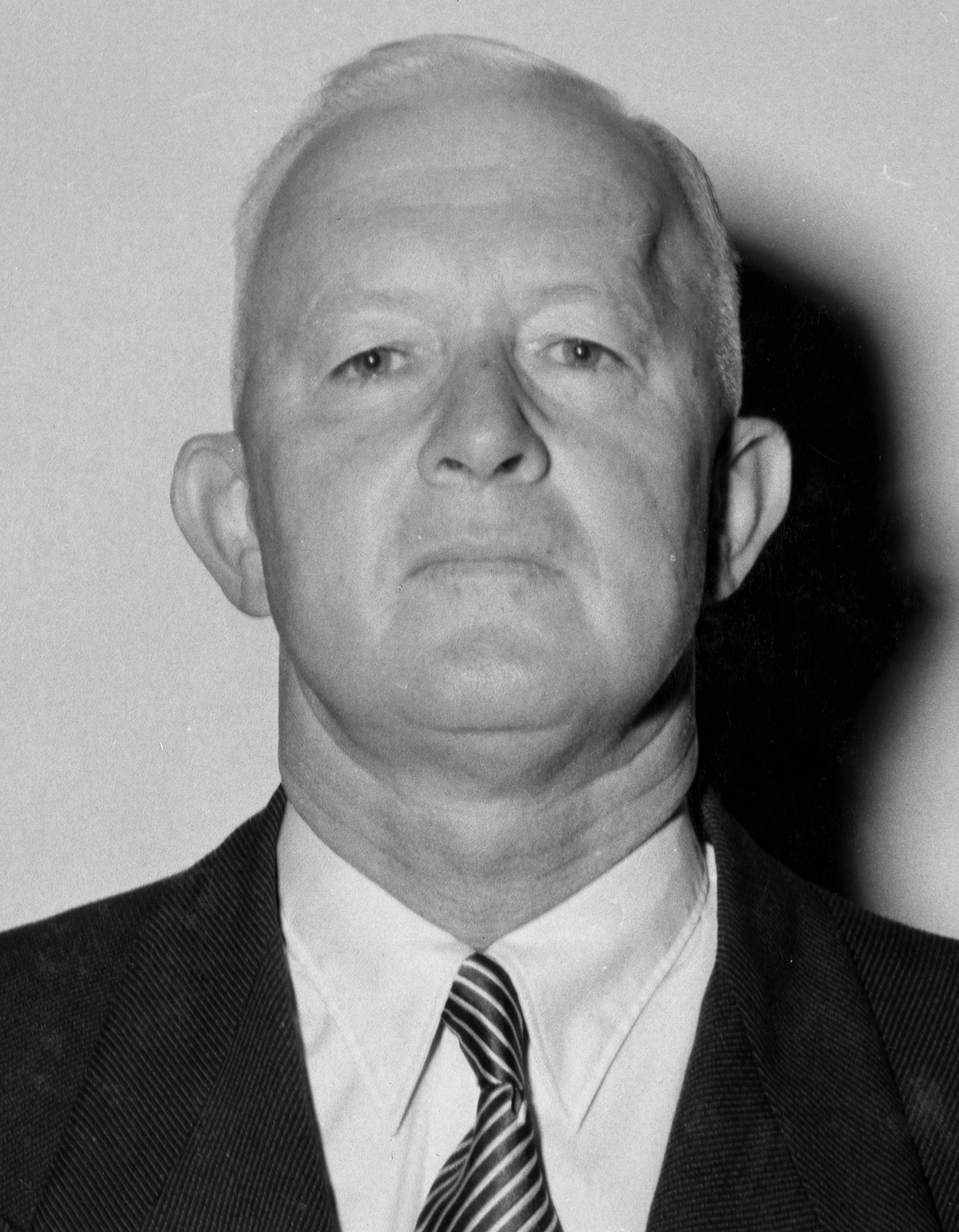

19th Deputy Premier of Queensland
- In office 28 January 1965 – 23 December 1965
- Premier: Frank Nicklin
- Preceded by: Alan Munro
- Succeeded by: Gordon Chalk

Leader of the Queensland Liberal Party Elections: 1950, 1953
- In office 28 January 1965 – 23 December 1965
- Deputy: Gordon Chalk
- Preceded by: Alan Munro
- Succeeded by: Gordon Chalk
- In office 9 July 1949 – 12 August 1954
- Deputy: Charles Wanstall (1949–1950); Kenneth Morris (1950–1954)
- Preceded by: Position established
- Succeeded by: Kenneth Morris

Deputy Leader of the Queensland Liberal Party
- In office 26 September 1962 – 28 January 1965
- Leader: Alan Munro
- Preceded by: Alan Munro
- Succeeded by: Gordon Chalk

34th Treasurer of Queensland
- In office 12 August 1957 – 23 December 1965
- Premier: Frank Nicklin
- Preceded by: Ted Walsh
- Succeeded by: Gordon Chalk

Minister for Housing
- In office 12 August 1957 – 25 September 1963
- Premier: Frank Nicklin
- Preceded by: Colin McCathie
- Succeeded by: Joh Bjelke-Petersen

Leader of the Queensland People's Party
- In office 3 February 1948 – 9 July 1949
- Deputy: Charles Wanstall (1949)
- Preceded by: Bruce Pie
- Succeeded by: Position abolished

Member of the Queensland Legislative Assembly for Chatsworth Coorparoo (1950–1960) Logan (1944–1950)
- In office 15 April 1944 – 28 May 1966
- Preceded by: John Brown
- Succeeded by: Bill Hewitt

Personal details
- Born: 25 November 1905 Brisbane, Queensland, Australia
- Died: 6 November 1990 (aged 84) Cooroy, Queensland, Australia
- Party: Liberal Party
- Other political affiliations: Queensland People's Party
- Spouse: Marjory Joyce Jarrott (1929 – died 1972)
- Children: 2
- Education: University of Queensland
- Occupation: Accountant, Public servant

Sir Thomas Alfred Hiley, KBE (25 November 1905 – 6 November 1990) an Australian politician who served as the Deputy Premier of Queensland in 1965.

== Early life ==
Hiley was born in Brisbane, Queensland, the son of William and Maria Hiley (nee Savage). He was educated at Central Brisbane Primary School, Brisbane Grammar School and the University of Queensland. Hiley worked as a Chartered Accountant.

== Political career ==
Hiley entered the Legislative Assembly of Queensland as member for Logan on 15 April 1944, a seat he held until switching to the new seat of Coorparoo on 29 April 1950.

When Coorparoo was abolished on 28 May 1960, Hiley represented the new district of Chatsworth until retiring on 28 May 1966.

Hiley was Treasurer of Queensland from 12 August 1957 to 23 December 1965 and leader of the Liberal Party in Queensland from 8 July 1949 to 12 August 1954 and again from 28 January to 23 December 1965.

Hiley was knighted as a Knight Commander of the Order of the British Empire (KBE) For service as Deputy Premier of Queensland.

== Memorials ==
'Sir Thomas Hiley Park' was opened in Tewantin, Queensland on 17 April 1983 by Tony Elliott, who at the time was Minister for Tourism, National Parks, Sport and the Arts. Hiley had pioneered a project to allow wide-open areas for the community. The site is currently under lease to the Department of Defence as an Australian Navy Cadets Training Ship.

Political offices
Preceded by Ted Walsh	Treasurer of Queensland; 1957–1965	Succeeded by Gordon Chalk
Parliament of Queensland
Preceded by John Brown	Member for Logan; 1944 – 1950	Abolished
New seat	Member for Coorparoo; 1950 – 1960	Abolished
New seat	Member for Chatsworth; 1960 – 1966	Succeeded by Bill Hewitt
