= Ian Prentice =

Australian politician

Member of the Queensland Legislative Assembly for Toowong
- In office 29 November 1980 – 22 October 1983
- Preceded by: Charles Porter
- Succeeded by: Earle Bailey

Personal details
- Born: Ian George Prentice; 9 November 1948 (age 77) Brisbane, Queensland, Australia
- Party: Liberal Party
- Spouse: Jane Righetti (m.1977)
- Education: University of Queensland
- Occupation: Barrister

Ian George Prentice (born 9 November 1948) was a member of the Queensland Legislative Assembly.

== Biography ==
Prentice was born in Brisbane, Queensland, the son of Dr. Peter George Driver Prentice and his wife Joan Elizabeth (née Masters). He attended Shorncliffe State School before completing his schooling at St Paul's School at Bald Hills. He then graduated from the University of Queensland with a LL.B.

Working as a barrister, he also worked for the federal government in census and statistics and was a research officer for John Moore, the federal member for Ryan.

On 2 July 1977 Prentice married Jane Righetti and together had a son and daughter. Jane is the former federal member for Ryan.

== Public life ==
Prentice, representing the Liberal Party, was the member for Toowong in the Queensland Legislative Assembly from 1980 until his defeat in 1983. He was part of the Ginger Group of Liberal politicians who disagreed with a number of actions of the National-Liberal Coalition government, even though they were technically government backbenchers.

He served in several roles in the Liberal Party and the government of the day, including:

- State President of the Young Liberal Movement of Australia, Queensland Division – 1976–1978
- Member of the Liberal Party State Executive – 1976–1980
- Member of the Liberal Party Policy Committee – 1976–1980
- Member of the Select Committee on Subordinate Legislation – 1981
- Member of the Parliamentary Printing Committee – 1981

For his work with the Young Liberals Prentice was awarded a life membership.

Parliament of Queensland
Preceded by Charles Porter	Member for Toowong; 1980–1983	Succeeded by Earle Bailey
