= Alex Dewar =

Australian politician

The Honourable Alex Dewar

Deputy Leader of the Queensland Liberal Party
- In office 23 December 1965 – 9 June 1967
- Leader: Gordon Chalk
- Preceded by: Gordon Chalk
- Succeeded by: Peter Delamothe

Minister for Industrial Development
- In office 28 January 1965 – 9 June 1967
- Premier: Frank Nicklin
- Preceded by: Alan Munro
- Succeeded by: Fred Campbell

Minister for Labour and Industry
- In office 10 January 1963 – 28 January 1965
- Premier: Frank Nicklin
- Preceded by: Kenneth Morris
- Succeeded by: John Herbert

Member of the Queensland Legislative Assembly for Wavell Chermside (1950–1960)
- In office 29 April 1950 – 17 May 1969
- Preceded by: New seat
- Succeeded by: Arthur Crawford

Personal details
- Born: Alexander Tattenhall Dewar; 19 June 1912 Brisbane, Queensland, Australia
- Died: 7 January 1995 (aged 82) Brisbane, Queensland, Australia
- Party: Liberal Party
- Other political affiliations: Independent Liberal
- Spouse: Ailsa Marjorie Drain (m.1946 d.1991)
- Occupation: Leather manufacturing

Alexander Tattenhall Dewar (19 June 1912 – 7 January 1995) was a leather manufacturer and member of the Queensland Legislative Assembly.

== Early life ==
Dewar was born in Brisbane, Queensland, to parents Alexander Sawers Dewar and his wife Elizabeth Fraser (née Macdonald). He was educated at Chermside and Wooloowin State Schools and the Commercial High School. In World War II he served in 143rd Australian General Transport Company from 1942 and then joined the RAAF the next year where he achieved the rank of Flying officer and serving in England and Canada. He was discharged in February 1946 and took up work at the family leather manufacturing in Kedron.

== Political career ==
At the 1950 state election, Dewar contested the new seat of Chermside for the Liberal Party and defeated Labor's J.B. Macarthur. He held the seat until it was abolished for the 1960 election. He then won the seat of Wavell, holding it until his defeat in 1969.

During his time in Parliament he was Chairman of the Parliamentary Committee on Problems of Youth (1957-1959), Minister for Labour and Industry (1963-1965), Minister for Industrial Development (1965-1967) and deputy leader of the Liberal Party in 1965.

He was forced to resign as Minister for Industrial Development in 1967 for allegedly "kissing and certain other actions" with two girls from the Department of Labor and Tourism. Dewar was outraged at the accusations and accused departmental public servants of spreading the story. He resigned from the Liberal Party in August 1968 and sat as an Independent Liberal for the last year of his parliamentary career.

== Personal life ==
On the 16 Nov 1946, Dewar married Ailsa Marjorie Drain (died 1991) and together had one son and one daughter.

Dewar died in January 1995 and was cremated at Albany Creek Memorial Park Crematorium.

Parliament of Queensland
New seat	Member for Chermside; 1950–1960	Abolished
New seat	Member for Wavell; 1960–1969	Succeeded by Arthur Crawford
