= Alan Munro (politician) =

Australian politician

The Honourable Sir Alan Munro KBE

18th Deputy Premier of Queensland
- In office 26 September 1962 – 28 January 1965
- Premier: Frank Nicklin
- Preceded by: Kenneth Morris
- Succeeded by: Thomas Hiley

Minister for Industrial Development
- In office 26 September 1963 – 28 January 1965
- Premier: Frank Nicklin
- Preceded by: Office established
- Succeeded by: Alex Dewar

Leader of the Queensland Liberal Party Elections: 1963
- In office 26 September 1962 – 28 January 1965
- Deputy: Thomas Hiley
- Preceded by: Kenneth Morris
- Succeeded by: Thomas Hiley

Attorney-General of Queensland and Minister for Justice
- In office 12 August 1957 – 26 September 1963
- Premier: Frank Nicklin
- Preceded by: William Power
- Succeeded by: Peter Delamothe

Member of the Queensland Legislative Assembly for Toowong
- In office 29 April 1950 – 28 May 1966
- Preceded by: Charles Wanstall
- Succeeded by: Charles Porter

Personal details
- Born: Alan Whiteside Munro; 23 May 1898 Brisbane, Queensland, Australia
- Died: 8 July 1968 (aged 70) Brisbane, Queensland, Australia
- Party: Liberal Party
- Spouse: Minnie Beryl Nicholson (m.1921 d.1977)
- Occupation: Accountant

Sir Alan Whiteside Munro KBE (23 May 1898 – 8 July 1968) was a member of the Queensland Legislative Assembly. He was the Deputy Premier of Queensland from 1963 until 1965.

== Early life ==
Munro was born in Brisbane, Queensland, the son of George Whiteside and his wife Florence Emily Maude (née Schmidt). He attended Brisbane Grammar School and after finishing school he was a public servant for the federal government from 1913 until 1924 and then he took up accounting for the rest of his career.

He was a member of the Volunteer Defence Corps from 1941 to 1944 and chairman of the Queensland State Council of the Institute of Chartered Accountants 1940–1942. Munro then became president of the Brisbane Chamber of Commerce from 1942 to 1944 and Chairman of Directors of Queensland Newspapers Pty Ltd, from 1949 to 1950.

== Political career ==
Munro, representing the Liberal Party, won the seat of Toowong at the 1950 Queensland state election, replacing the retiring member, Charles Wanstall. He held the seat until 1966 when he retired from politics to allow "younger men to take the reins".

He served in several roles in the government of the day, including:

- Attorney-General – 1957
- Minister for Justice and Attorney-General – 1957–1963
- Leader of the Liberal Party and Deputy Premier – 1962–1965
- Minister for Industrial Development – 1963–1965

He was awarded a Knight Commander of the Order of the British Empire on 12 Jun 1965 for his "distinguished and statesmanlike services to the state as a minister and parliamentarian".

== Personal life ==
On 29 June 1921 Munro married Minnie Beryl Nicholson (died 1977) and together had two sons. One son, Sergeant Donald Whiteside Munro, died in New Guinea while flying his Kittyhawk in 1942. Munro died in Brisbane in July 1968 and was accorded a state funeral.

Parliament of Queensland
Preceded by Charles Wanstall	Member for Toowong; 1950–1966	Succeeded by Charles Porter
