= Charles Wanstall =

Australian politician (1912–1999)

Sir Charles Wanstall

13th Chief Justice of Queensland
- In office 19 July 1977 – 17 February 1982
- Preceded by: Mostyn Hanger
- Succeeded by: Walter Campbell

Member of the Queensland Legislative Assembly for Toowong
- In office 15 April 1944 – 29 April 1950
- Preceded by: Harry Massey
- Succeeded by: Alan Munro

Personal details
- Born: Charles Gray Wanstall; 17 February 1912 Brisbane, Queensland, Australia
- Died: 17 October 1999 (aged 87) Corinda, Queensland, Australia
- Party: QPP
- Spouse: Olwyn Mabel John (m.1938 d.1998)
- Occupation: Chief Justice of the Supreme Court of Queensland

Sir Charles Gray Wanstall (17 February 1912 – 17 October 1999) was a member of the Queensland Legislative Assembly. He was also the Chief Justice of Queensland.

== Early life ==
Wanstall was born in Brisbane, Queensland in the family of bank officer Ernest William Wanstall and his wife Emma (née Boyce). He attended state school in Roma and Gympie and then studied at the Gympie High School.

== Career ==
He attended night school and studied Law with the Bar Board (Formal Education – Barristers Board Queensland) to become a Barrister (Barrister-at-Law) and having completed the Bar board requirements in 1933 and was admitted as a Barrister of the Supreme Court of Queensland.

After working for the Crown Law Office from 1933 to 1935 he started his own civil law practice in 1936 and was admitted to practice before the High Court of Australia in 1942. Wanstall not only practised in civil law, he practiced broadly including in criminal law. An example of his criminal law practice was when he was called to the represent his old school mate a local Gympie butcher from Gympie, who was charged with cattle rustling (stealing cattle), and such case Wanstall convincingly had his old school mate, acquitted. He practiced from Bank of New South Wales Chambers, cnr. Queen and George Streets Brisbane. Wanstall was made a QC in 1956 and was then a judge of the Queensland Supreme Court from 1958 to 1982. By 1971 he was the Senior Puisne judge and in 1977 was promoted to Chief Justice of Queensland, holding the position until his compulsory retirement at the age of 70 in 1982.

He was made a Knight Bachelor on 15 June 1974 for distinguished service as a judge of the Queensland Supreme Court. Wanstall was a foundation member of the Queensland Cancer Fund and for over twenty years was the chairman of the board of trustees. In recognition of his work with the fund, the Sir Charles Wanstall Apex Lodge bears his name. He was also chairman of the Queensland Ballet Company and the president of the Society Welfare Services. He served on committees for the Guide Dogs for the Blind Association and the Multiple Handicapped Association.

=== Political career ===
Wanstall, representing the Queensland People's Party, won the seat of Toowong at the 1944 Queensland state election, easily defeating the sitting member, Harry Massey. He held the seat for six years and retired from politics in 1950.

In his maiden speech, he called for the repeal of the Commonwealth Powers Act of 1943 and a revision of electoral boundaries. He also stated his opinion that votes cast at the last state election by the holders of proxies for soldiers present in the state on the day of the election were invalid and illegal. From 1950 until 1953 Wanstall was State President of the Liberal Party.

== Personal life ==
Wanstall was heavily involved in the Anglican Church and for 20 years was the chancellor of the Brisbane Diocese.

On 14 June 1938, Wanstall married Olwyn John (died 1998) and together had one daughter. He died at Corinda in October 1999 and was cremated at the Albany Creek Crematorium. At his funeral the then Chief Justice of Queensland, Paul de Jersey, gave the eulogy.

Legal offices
Preceded by Mostyn Hanger	Chief Justice of Queensland; 1977–1982	Succeeded by Walter Campbell
Parliament of Queensland
Preceded by Harry Massey	Member for Toowong; 1944–1950	Succeeded by Alan Munro
