= Electoral district of Wavell =

Former state electoral district of Queensland, Australia

Wavell Queensland—Legislative Assembly
- State: Queensland
- Created: 1960
- Abolished: 1986
- Namesake: Wavell Heights, Queensland

Wavell was an electoral district of the Legislative Assembly in the Australian state of Queensland from 1960 to 1986.

The district was based in the northern suburbs of Brisbane.

== Members for Wavell ==
Member	Party	Term
Alex Dewar	Liberal Party	1960–1968
Alex Dewar	Independent	1968–1969
Arthur Crawford	Liberal Party	1969–1977
Brian Austin	Liberal Party	1977–1983
Brian Austin	National Party	1983–1986

== See also ==
- Electoral districts of Queensland
- Members of the Queensland Legislative Assembly by year
- Category:Members of the Queensland Legislative Assembly by name
