= Frank Nicklin =

Australian politician (1895–1978)

The Honourable Sir Frank Nicklin KCMG, MM
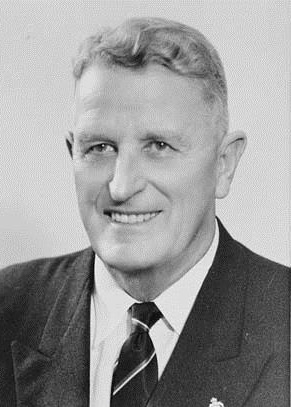

28th Premier of Queensland
- In office 12 August 1957 – 17 January 1968
- Monarch: Elizabeth II
- Governor: Sir John Lavarack; Sir Henry Abel Smith; Sir Alan Mansfield
- Deputy: Kenneth Morris; Alan Munro; Gordon Chalk
- Preceded by: Vince Gair
- Succeeded by: Jack Pizzey

Leader of the Opposition in Queensland
- In office 21 May 1941 – 3 August 1957
- Preceded by: Ted Maher
- Succeeded by: Les Wood

Leader of the Country Party in Queensland
- In office 21 May 1941 – 17 January 1968
- Preceded by: Ted Maher
- Succeeded by: Jack Pizzey

Member of the Legislative Assembly for Landsborough
- In office 29 April 1950 – 13 February 1968
- Preceded by: New seat
- Succeeded by: Mike Ahern

Member of the Legislative Assembly for Murrumba
- In office 11 June 1932 – 29 April 1950
- Preceded by: Richard Warren
- Succeeded by: David Nicholson

Personal details
- Born: 6 August 1895 Murwillumbah, Colony of New South Wales
- Died: 29 January 1978 (aged 82) Nambour, Queensland, Australia
- Party: Country Party
- Spouse: Georgina Robertson Fleming (d. 1960)
- Education: Murwillumbah Public School; Highfield College
- Occupation: Fruit Grower; Army Officer; Politician

Military service
- Allegiance: Australia
- Branch/service: Australian Army
- Years of service: 1916–1919; 1942–1946
- Rank: Lieutenant Colonel
- Unit: 49th Battalion
- Commands: 6th Battalion, Volunteer Defence Corps
- Battles/wars: First World War; Second World War
- Awards: Military Medal

Sir George Francis Reuben Nicklin, KCMG, MM (6 August 1895 – 29 January 1978) was an Australian politician. He was the Premier of Queensland from 1957 to 1968, the first non-Labor Party premier since 1932.

== Early life and career ==
Nicklin was born in Murwillumbah, New South Wales on 6 August 1895, the son of newspaper proprietor George Francis Nicklin and his New Zealand-born wife, Edith Catherine (née Bond).

Nicklin was educated at Murwillumbah Public School and Highfield College in Turramurra, Sydney. In 1910 the family moved to Beerwah in Queensland, where Nicklin's father took up banana farming. Nicklin enlisted in the Australian Imperial Force in 1916 and served with distinction during the First World War, where he was promoted to corporal and was awarded the Military Medal. On his return to Queensland he bought a small pineapple farm at Palmwoods, 100 kilometres north of Brisbane, through a soldier-settler scheme. Nicklin saved wisely and put his farming experience to good use, and his farm succeeded where many others failed. He led many fruit-growers' organisations, and then became involved in Country Party politics.

When the Member for the solid Country Party seat of Murrumba retired in 1932, Nicklin became the new candidate for the hybrid urban-regional seat in Brisbane and the Sunshine Coast. He won the seat, although the Country and Progressive National Party Government of A. E. Moore was heavily defeated. Nicklin, therefore, entered Parliament as an opposition backbencher. He transferred to the newly created Sunshine Coast seat of Landsborough in 1950.

Nicklin was a popular and hardworking local member, and remained popular throughout very difficult times for the Country Party in Queensland. The opposition was fractured and weak, and the Government of William Forgan Smith very secure. Nicklin's preferred area was agriculture, and he made many speeches on the subject.

== Opposition Leader ==
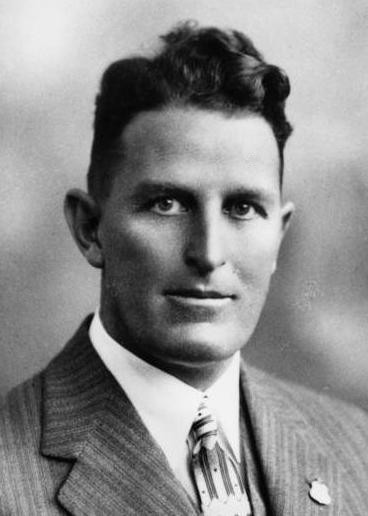
Nicklin as Opposition Leader in 1948.

In 1941 the opposition suffered another severe defeat, with Labor winning 41 seats to the Country Party's 14 and the United Australia Party's four. After the election, the Queensland caucuses of the two non-Labor parties decided to merge as the Country-National Organisation. Opposition leader Ted Maher stood down, and Nicklin was elected to lead the merged party. The merger fell apart in 1944, but Nicklin remained as head of a Country-UAP coalition.

Nicklin was leader of the opposition for sixteen years, losing five elections in a row (1944, 1947, 1950, 1953, 1956). In 1942 Labor abolished full preferential voting in favour of first-past-the-post, meaning that the Country Party and UAP could no longer rely on each other's preferences in seats that they both contested. Even more damaging to the coalition's chances was the introduction of a zonal electoral system in 1949, in which seats in the traditional Labor north and west of the state required fewer members than the Country-Party dominated south-east or the Queensland People's Party (formerly UAP, soon to be the Liberals) dominated metropolitan areas.

Despite these setbacks, Nicklin was never challenged for the leadership. Many coalition members appeared to have despaired of ever defeating Labor, and were content to simply represent their constituencies. Accordingly, Nicklin was left to handle most of the business of opposition. He acknowledged to a 1955 conference of leading Country Party figures that their chances of ever being seated to the right of the speaker were slim, but he continued as opposition leader anyway. After the 1956 election, in which he was severely defeated by Labor's Vince Gair, Nicklin considered retiring from politics. However, his fortunes would soon change.

The late 1950s saw increasing fear of communism in Australia, and increasing tensions between the Parliamentary Labor Party and the party's union-dominated Central Executive (QCE) in Queensland. These tensions boiled over in 1957, when the QCE pushed the Government to introduce three weeks' paid leave for public servants. Gair refused, and Nicklin backed him, arguing that the QCE was dominated by unaccountable left-wing trade union leaders with communist sympathies.

On 24 April Gair was expelled from the ALP, and he and his supporters—including all of the cabinet except Deputy Premier Jack Duggan-formed the Queensland Labor Party (QLP). This body would later join the anti-communist Democratic Labor Party (DLP) which had arisen out of a split in the ALP in Victoria. Reduced to a minority government, Gair negotiated with Nicklin for support from the Country Party in Parliament. However, Nicklin broke off the talks at the suggestion of federal Country Party leader Arthur Fadden (himself a Queenslander), who believed that given the ructions in Labor, Nicklin had a good chance to become Premier himself.

On 12 June 1957, Lieutenant Governor and Chief Justice of Queensland Alan Mansfield (Governor John Lavarack was indisposed) ordered Parliament to reassemble. Shortly after 10:30 pm that night, Treasurer Ted Walsh moved that supply be granted to the Gair QLP government. The remnants of the ALP, now led by Duggan, crossed the floor and voted against the Government. Sensing his long-denied chance had come, Nicklin instructed the Coalition to block supply as well, bringing the Gair government down.

== Premiership ==
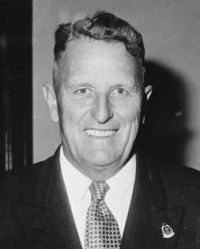
Nicklin as Premier in 1959.

In the ensuing election on 3 August 1957, every QLP MP faced an ALP challenger, while every ALP MP faced a QLP challenger. This created dozens of three-cornered contests.

Taking advantage of the split in the Labor vote, Nicklin's Country-Liberal coalition won a decisive victory with 42 seats – the first non-Labor victory since 1932. The two Labor factions won only 31 seats between them. Nicklin was the first of six consecutive Country/National Party leaders to become Premier.

Nicklin's first priority was to reverse the zonal electoral system in favour of his Government. Nicklin's redistribution was fairer than Hanlon's, but it still favoured the Country Party. The far-western region went down from five seats to three, and the provincial cities (which had traditionally voted ALP) were separated from their hinterlands, in which new Country Party seats were created. As a result, Liberals gained new seats in Brisbane, and in return they agreed not to contest the zonal electoral system, despite the fact that it allowed the Country Party to be the senior coalition partner even if it won fewer votes than the Liberal Party (which it did after 1966). Another electoral reform in the form of compulsory preferential voting was introduced in 1960, when it became clear that the QLP no longer posed a threat, and that QLP voters were likely to give their preferences to a Country-Liberal coalition over the ALP in any event. Largely on the strength of QLP preferences, the Coalition scored a healthy four-seat swing in the 1960 state election—the first time since 1912 that a non-Labor government had been reelected. The QLP eventually became the Queensland branch of the Democratic Labor Party.

The Country and Liberal Parties enjoyed a harmonious relationship, with Nicklin and Liberal leader Kenneth Morris being friends as well as colleagues. The parties had some disputes over seat allocation in the mid-1960s, and Morris was not always an easy man to work with, but on the whole the Nicklin Government saw a period of remarkably cordial relations between the Nationals and Liberals, especially compared with the strife of later years. Morris retired in 1962 and was succeeded by Sir Alan Munro, also a staunch coalitionist. After only three years, Munro handed the Liberal leadership to Sir Gordon Chalk, who was also a very staunch coalitionist.

By comparison with the political turbulence in Queensland during the 1950s and the 1970s, the 1960s were singularly subdued. Primarily the Nicklin Government concentrated on employment relations and on developing the state's infrastructure. In general, Nicklin saw little reason to lose electoral capital by passing tough industrial relations laws during times of prosperity. However, the most serious crises of the Nicklin Premiership were based in poor handling of unions.

In 1961, at Morris' insistence, the old Industrial Court was replaced by the Industrial Relations and Arbitration Commission, which had less power. It could not raise award payments, although it could decrease them. At the time, the miners of Mount Isa Mines (MIM) were lodging a claim for a wage rise, which could not go through the new commission. This resulted in a strike which only ended with an uneasy truce. The dispute broke out again in 1964, and again the mine needed to be closed down. Here, Nicklin acted erratically. First he did nothing for months, then passed a harsh order-in-council expanding police powers to deal with the strike. This came just as the issues behind the strike were being resolved, and caused the negotiations to break down again. While the mines could eventually reopen, Nicklin was condemned for poor handling of the crisis.

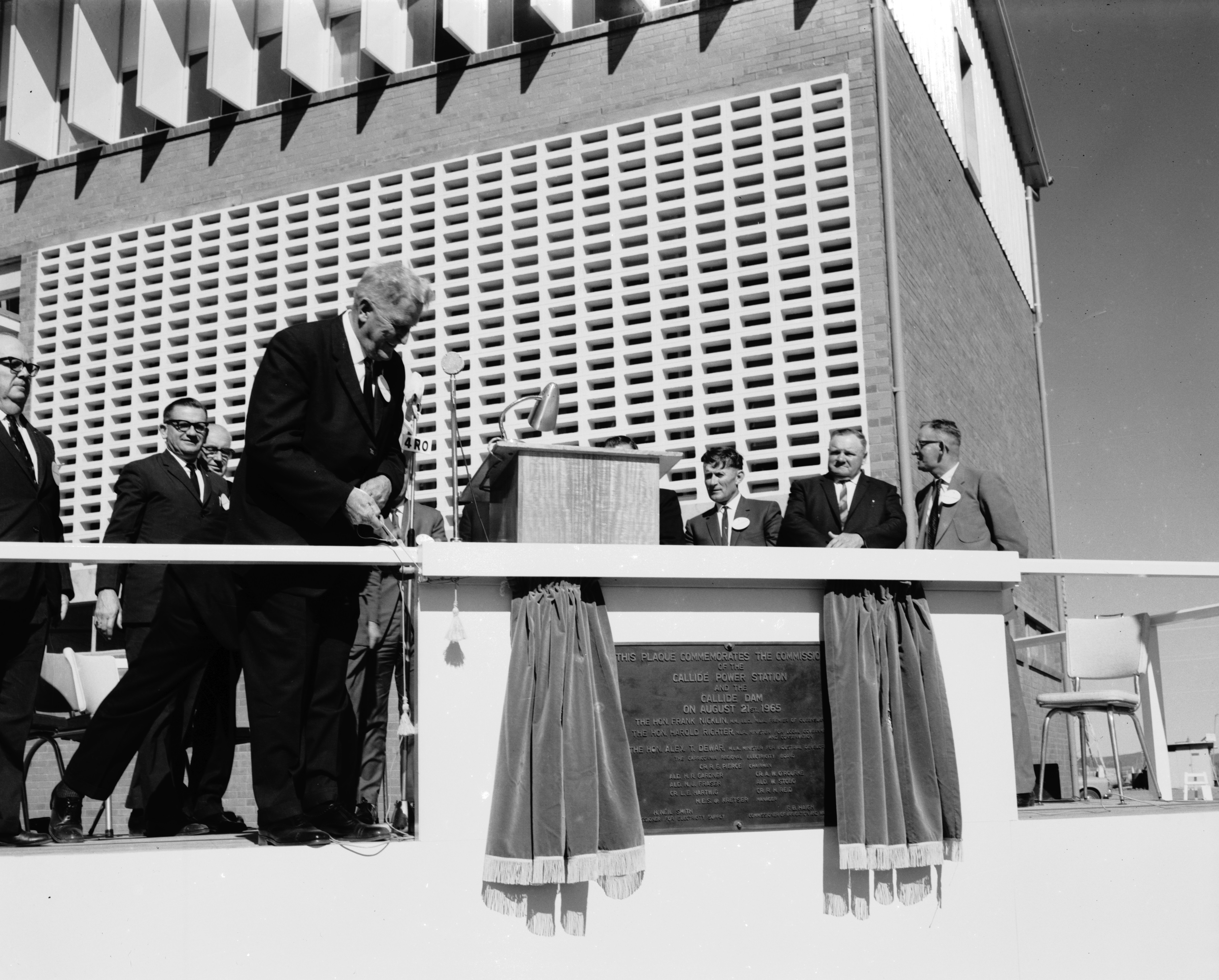
Premier Frank Nicklin opening Callide Power Station, 21 August 1965

As he was leading a government that lacked experience, Nicklin knew that he would be relying heavily on Queensland's leading bureaucrats. He treated the public service union with care, restoring the privilege of a half-day's leave to visit the annual exhibition.

Nicklin viewed his own achievements as Premier in terms of state development. Like most Queensland Premiers, he believed in building and capital works. Under Nicklin, road mileage doubled, irrigated land doubled, and a number of projects such as the Moogerah Dam were undertaken. Mining boomed – total mining output almost trebled, and Weipa became the largest bauxite mine in the world. The Nicklin Government, especially through effective Treasurers such as Tom Hiley, was good at attracting foreign customers for Queensland's minerals and other produce.

Probably Nicklin is best remembered for his probity, which earned him the nickname 'Honest Frank'. It is not recorded who first coined the term, but it spread quickly and was widely accepted, even by Nicklin's opponents, as being accurate. Nicklin was not widely known when he became Premier, and while he was too modest a man to indulge in self-aggrandising publicity he was skilled enough as a politician to benefit from the way in which his reputation for decency stuck with him.

Nicklin held his Cabinet to high standards. He was only forced to dismiss ministers on two occasions, once for tax evasion and once for a sexual harassment scandal, and in both cases he lied to cover the real reasons for the ministers' departure. These stories seem to be the only deliberate untruths he ever told to the public while in office. Nicklin's hold over his cabinet was firm, and there was no question that ministers who could not live up to Nicklin's standards were summarily dismissed.

From 1966 Nicklin's health declined markedly, and at the end of 1967 he announced that he would retire from politics on 17 January 1968. He had served 35 years in the legislature and 27 years as leader of the non-Labor forces in Queensland. His 10 years and five months as Premier was then a Queensland record. In 1968 he was knighted, and in a rare concession to formality chose to be dubbed 'Sir Francis'. He died on 29 January 1978, aged 82. At his own choice, he was not given the pomp and ceremony of a state funeral.

== Assessment ==
The state electorate of Nicklin and the Nicklin Way arterial road, both based on the Sunshine Coast, are named in his honour.

Political offices
Preceded by Vince Gair	Premier of Queensland; 1957–1968	Succeeded by Jack Pizzey
Preceded by Ted Maher	Leader of the Opposition of Queensland; 1941–1957	Succeeded by Les Wood
Parliament of Queensland
Preceded by Richard Warren	Member for Murrumba; 1932–1950	Succeeded by David Nicholson
New seat	Member for Landsborough; 1950–1968	Succeeded by Mike Ahern
