= Candidates of the 1963 Queensland state election =

The 1963 Queensland state election was held on 1 June 1963.

The Queensland Labor Party (QLP) formally affiliated with the national Democratic Labor Party (DLP) in 1962, resulting in two of its members resigning to sit as independents. Seats won by the QLP in 1960 are listed as DLP-held below.

== By-elections ==
- On 1 July 1961, Eugene O'Donnell (Labor) was elected to succeed Edward Davis (Labor), who had died on 10 March 1961, as the member for Barcoo.
- On 1 July 1961, Ron Camm (Country) was elected to succeed Lloyd Roberts, who had died on 11 March 1961, as the member for Whitsunday

== Retiring Members ==
- Note: Mount Gravatt Liberal MLA Graham Hart resigned shortly before the election; no by-election was held.

=== Labor ===
- Jim Burrows MLA (Port Curtis)

=== Liberal ===
- Kenneth Morris MLA (Mount Coot-tha)
- Harold Taylor MLA (Clayfield)

== Candidates ==
Sitting members at the time of the election are shown in bold text.

Electorate	Held by	Labor candidate	Coalition candidate	DLP candidate	Other candidates
Albert	Country	Eugene Ulrick	**Cec Carey** (CP)		Ernest Harley (Ind)
Ashgrove	Liberal	Terry Kearney	**Douglas Tooth** (Lib)	George Cook	
Aspley	Liberal	Edward Humbler	**Fred Campbell** (Lib)	Brian Balaam	
Aubigny	DLP	Bruce Strachan	Somerset Thorn (CP)	**Les Diplock**	
Balonne	Country	Russell Hall	**Eddie Beardmore** (CP)		
Barambah	Country	William Weir	**Joh Bjelke-Petersen** (CP)		Percy Edwards (Ind)
Barcoo	Labor	**Eugene O'Donnell**	Gordon Vandersee (CP)		
Baroona	Labor	**Pat Hanlon**	Dawn Stanton (Lib)	Douglas Garsden	Vincent Englart (CPA)
Belmont	Labor	**Fred Newton**	Cecil Schuurs (Lib)	John Taylor	
Bowen	Liberal	John Gralton	**Peter Delamothe** (Lib)	Jim McCane	
Brisbane	Labor	**Johnno Mann**	James Rowan (Lib)	Jack O'Connell	
Bulimba	Labor	**Jack Houston**	Stan Latham (Lib)	Paul Tucker	
Bundaberg	DLP	Matthew Tallon			**Ted Walsh** (Ind)
Burdekin	Independent	Thomas Niven		Oliver Andersen	**Arthur Coburn** (Ind)
Burke	Labor	**Alec Inch**			
Burnett	Country	Denis Grace	**Claude Wharton** (CP)		
Cairns	Labor	**Watty Wallace**	Charles Joy (CP)	Arthur Trembath	
Callide	Country	Keith Coombs	**Vince Jones** (CP)	Nancy Green	Alfred O'Rourke (Ind)
Carnarvon	DLP	Douglas Gow	Henry McKechnie (CP)	**Paul Hilton**	
Chatsworth	Liberal	Bob Bradfield	**Thomas Hiley** (Lib)	Vince Garrigan	
Clayfield	Liberal	Norm Butler	John Murray (Lib)	Jack Dolan	
Condamine	Country	Reg Keating	**Vic Sullivan** (CP)		
Cook	DLP	Jack Bethel			**Bunny Adair** (Ind)
Cooroora	Country	Lancelot Sanderson	**David Low** (CP)		Theophilus Chapman (Ind)
Cunningham	Country	Brian Davis	**Alan Fletcher** (CP)	Herbert Scott	
Fassifern	Country	Denis O'Brien	Albert Hall (CP)	Kenneth Rawle	**Alf Muller** (Ind)
Flinders	Country	Charles Rattray	**Bill Longeran** (CP)	John Judge	
Greenslopes	Liberal	John Hughes	**Keith Hooper** (Lib)	Terry Burns	Eric Allen (SC); Edmund Crisp (CPA)
Gregory	Country	Martin Laracy	**Wally Rae** (CP)	Bill Hutchinson	
Gympie	Country	Blair Jamieson	**Max Hodges** (CP)	Denis Tanner	
Hawthorne	Labor	**Bill Baxter**	Bill Kaus (Lib)	Rogers Judge	
Hinchinbrook	Country	Kevin Cavanagh	**John Row** (CP)	Jack Williams	George Bordujenko (CPA)
Ipswich East	Labor	**Jim Donald**	Hedley Scriven (Lib)	Andrij Janicky	Vic Robb (SC)
Ipswich West	Labor	**Ivor Marsden**	Jim Cochrane (Lib)	Len Maguire	
Isis	Country	George Hooper	**Jack Pizzey** (CP)	Tom Carroll	Arnold Jones (SC)
Ithaca	Liberal	Lou Clifford	**Bob Windsor** (Lib)	James Ashe	Bruce Tannock (SC)
Kedron	Labor	**Eric Lloyd**	Hubertus Toonen (Lib)	Ted Doherty	Ron Burrows (Ind)
Kurilpa	Liberal	Bernie Dokter	**Clive Hughes** (Lib)	Maurice Sheehan	Paul Kenealy (SC)
Landsborough	Country	Frank Freemantle	**Frank Nicklin** (CP)		
Lockyer	Liberal	James Keim	**Gordon Chalk** (Lib)	Brian Hannan	James Dwyer (Ind)
Logan	Country	William Ware	**Leslie Harrison** (CP)	Frank Andrews	
Mackay	Labor	**Fred Graham**	John Matson (CP)	Edwin Relf	
Mackenzie	Country	Patrick O'Brien	**Nev Hewitt** (CP)		
Maryborough	Labor	**Horace Davies**	Robert Hunter (CP)	Vincent Wenck	Douglas Devenish (SC)
Merthyr	Liberal	Tom Campbell	**Sam Ramsden** (Lib)	Geoffrey Traill	
Mirani	Country	George Moody	**Ernie Evans** (CP)		
Mount Coot-tha	Liberal	Norm Maddock	Bill Lickiss (Lib)	Max Muller	
Mount Gravatt	Liberal	Stuart Barnes	Geoff Chinchen (Lib)	Eric Allingham	
Mourilyan	Labor	**Peter Byrne**	Alf Martinuzzi (CP)	Geoff Higham	
Mulgrave	Country	Stanley Scoines	**Roy Armstrong** (CP)	Charles English	
Murrumba	Country	Norman Kruger	**David Nicholson** (CP)	John Carter	Francis O'Mara (Ind)
Norman	Labor	**Fred Bromley**	Cyril Ryan (Lib)	Harry Wright	David Gray (SC)
Nudgee	Labor	**Jack Melloy**	Dennis Hedges (Lib)	Mick O'Connor	
Nundah	Liberal	Frank Roberts	**William Knox** (Lib)	Denis Cleary	
Port Curtis	Labor	Martin Hanson		Doug McClarty	Tom Kelly (Ind)
Redcliffe	Independent	Colin McInnes	**Jim Houghton** (CP)	Michael Doyle	Eric Pritchard (Ind); Ernest Sykes (Ind)
Rockhampton North	Labor	**Merv Thackeray**	Phil German (Lib)	Richard Wasson	
Rockhampton South	Liberal	Charles White	**Rex Pilbeam** (Lib)	Stan Doolan	Brian Dillon (Ind)
Roma	Country	Herbert Williamson	**William Ewan** (CP)	Bryan Hurley	
Salisbury	Labor	**Doug Sherrington**	Keith Brough (Lib)	Miroslav Jansky	
Sandgate	Labor	**Harry Dean**	Maurice White (Lib)	Austin McShane	
Sherwood	Liberal	Vincent Kitson	**John Herbert** (Lib)	Len Galligan	
Somerset	Country	John Walters	**Harold Richter** (CP)		
South Brisbane	Labor	**Col Bennett**	Gabrielle Horan (Lib)	Greg Kehoe	
South Coast	Country	Irene Weir	**Eric Gaven** (CP)	Douglas Schwede	
Tablelands	Country	Edwin Wallis-Smith	**Tom Gilmore** (CP)	Leo McManus	Dino Bertoldo (Ind)
Toowong	Liberal	Leslie McGrath	**Alan Munro** (Lib)	Brian O'Brien	
Toowoomba East	Liberal	Peter Wood	**Mervyn Anderson** (Lib)	Frank Mullins	
Toowoomba West	Labor	**Jack Duggan**	August Dietz (Lib)	Terry Morris	
Townsville North	Labor	**Perc Tucker**	Robert Bonnett (Lib)	Kiernan Dorney	Alfred Reeves (Ind)
Townsville South	NQ Labor	Arthur Trower			**Tom Aikens** (NQLP)
Warrego	Labor	**John Dufficy**	Michael Turner (CP)		
Warwick	Country	Reggie Wenham	**Otto Madsen** (CP)	Daniel Skehan	
Wavell	Liberal	Benjamin Harriss	**Alex Dewar** (Lib)	Vincent Bedsor	Merv Goldstiver (SC)
Whitsunday	Country	John Barry	**Ron Camm** (CP)		
Windsor	Liberal	George Georgouras	**Ray Smith** (Lib)	Owen O'Donoghue	
Wynnum	Labor	**Bill Gunn**	Oswald Brunner (Lib)	Kevin O'Regan	
Yeronga	Liberal	Cyril Cusack	**Winston Noble** (Lib)	Mary Andrews	Roy Phipps (SC)

== See also ==
- 1963 Queensland state election
- Members of the Queensland Legislative Assembly, 1960–1963
- Members of the Queensland Legislative Assembly, 1963–1966
- List of political parties in Australia
