= Candidates of the 1966 Queensland state election =

The 1966 Queensland state election was held on 28 May 1966.

== Retiring Members ==
- Note: Logan Country MLA Leslie Harrison resigned before the election; no by-election was held.

=== Labor ===
- Bill Gunn MLA (Wynnum)
- Ivor Marsden MLA (Ipswich West)

=== Country ===
- Eric Gaven MLA (South Coast)

=== Liberal ===
- Mervyn Anderson MLA (Toowoomba East)
- Thomas Hiley MLA (Chatsworth)
- Sir Alan Munro MLA (Toowong)
- Bob Windsor MLA (Ithaca)

== Candidates ==
Sitting members at the time of the election are shown in bold text.

Electorate	Held by	Labor candidate	Coalition candidate	DLP candidate	Other candidates
Albert	Country	Harold Evans	**Cec Carey*** (CP); Ernest Harley (Lib)	Patrick Hallinan	
Ashgrove	Liberal	Richard Gill	**Douglas Tooth** (Lib)	George Cook	
Aspley	Liberal	John Purtell	**Fred Campbell** (Lib)	Rogers Judge	
Aubigny	DLP	Peter Fitzpatrick	John Corfe (CP)	**Les Diplock**	
Balonne	Country	Ben Ward	**Eddie Beardmore** (CP)		
Barambah	Country	Norman Hasemann	**Joh Bjelke-Petersen** (CP)		
Barcoo	Labor	**Eugene O'Donnell**	Michael Cronin (CP)	Edward Eshmann	
Baroona	Labor	**Pat Hanlon**	Ian Barron (Lib)	Anthony Machin	Brian Moynihan (CPA)
Belmont	Labor	**Fred Newton**	Oswald Brunner (Lib)	John Taylor	
Bowen	Liberal	John Gralton	**Peter Delamothe** (Lib)	James McCane	
Brisbane	Labor	**Johnno Mann**	Brian Cahill (Lib)	John O'Connell	
Bulimba	Labor	**Jack Houston**	Brian Perkins (Lib)	Paul Tucker	
Bundaberg	Independent	Matt Tallon			**Ted Walsh** (Ind)
Burdekin	Independent	Herbert O'Brien	Stanley Pearce (Lib)	Oliver Anderson	**Arthur Coburn** (Ind)
Burke	Labor	**Alec Inch**	William Presley (Lib)		John Donaldson (SC)
Burnett	Country	Alexander Craig	**Claude Wharton** (CP)		
Cairns	Labor	**Ray Jones**	David De Jarlais (Lib); John Franzmann (CP)	Arthur Trembath	Colin Penridge (Ind)
Callide	Country	Wilfred Prisgrove	**Vince Jones** (CP)	Edgar Lanigan	
Carnarvon	Country	Douglas Gow	**Henry McKechnie** (CP)	Frederick Burges	
Chatsworth	Liberal	John Cleary	Bill Hewitt (Lib)	Vincent Garrigan	Douglas Wallace (Ind)
Clayfield	Liberal	Bruce Strachan	**John Murray** (Lib)	Mary Ryan	
Condamine	Country	Roderick Blundell	**Vic Sullivan** (CP)		
Cook	Independent	Jack Bethel			**Bunny Adair** (Ind)
Cooroora	Country	Kenneth Kliese	**David Low** (CP)		
Cunningham	Country	Brian Davis	**Alan Fletcher** (CP)	Alexander Browne	
Fassifern	Independent	Denis O'Brien	**Alf Muller** (CP)	Gordon Blain	Victor Robb (SC)
Flinders	Country	Peter McKitrick	**Bill Longeran** (CP)	John Judge	Charles Rowe (Ind)
Greenslopes	Liberal	Cecil Chandler	**Keith Hooper** (Lib)	Harry Wright	
Gregory	Country	Gilbert Burns	**Wally Rae** (CP)	David Parker	
Gympie	Country	Marcus Dower	**Max Hodges** (CP)	Denis Tanner	
Hawthorne	Labor	Thomas Burton	Bill Kaus (Lib)	Greg Kehoe	**Bill Baxter** (Ind)
Hinchinbrook	Country	Natale Palanza	**John Row** (CP)	John Williams	
Ipswich East	Labor	**Jim Donald**	Hedley Scriven (Lib)		Douglas Wood (Ind)
Ipswich West	Labor	Vi Jordan	Allan Whybird (Lib)	Leonard Maguire	James Finimore (Ind)
Isis	Country	George Hooper	**Jack Pizzey** (CP)	Brian Hawes	
Ithaca	Liberal	Samuel Hudson	Col Miller (Lib)	James Ashe	
Kedron	Labor	**Eric Lloyd**	Christian Jesberg (Lib)	Edward Doherty	
Kurilpa	Liberal	Leslie Buckley	**Clive Hughes** (Lib)	Felix Doolan	William Smith (SC)
Landsborough	Country	Frank Freemantle	**Frank Nicklin** (CP)		
Lockyer	Liberal	James Keim	**Gordon Chalk** (Lib)		
Logan	Country	William Ware	Francis Dennis (Lib); Dick Wood* (CP)	Maurice Sheehan	Paul Kenealy (SC); Laurence Storey (Ind)
Mackay	Labor	**Fred Graham**	Roylance Eastment (CP)	T J Hayes	
Mackenzie	Country		**Nev Hewitt** (CP)		
Maryborough	Labor	**Horace Davies**	Ernest Jurss (CP)	William Hutchinson	Arnold Jones (SC)
Merthyr	Liberal	Brian Mellifont	**Sam Ramsden** (Lib)	Laurence Kehoe	
Mirani	Country	Gustav Creber	**Tom Newbery** (CP)	Edward Relf	
Mount Coot-tha	Liberal	Barry Gorman	**Bill Lickiss** (Lib)	Maxwell Muller	
Mount Gravatt	Liberal	Peter Rowe	**Geoff Chinchen** (Lib)	Kenneth Bayliss	
Mourilyan	Labor	**Peter Byrne**	Alfred Martinuzzi (CP)	Geoffrey Higham	
Mulgrave	Country	Stanley Dalton	**Roy Armstrong** (CP)		
Murrumba	Labor	Norm Kruger	Marshall Cooke (Lib); **David Nicholson*** (CP)	Robert Vlug	David Bishop (Ind)
Norman	Labor	**Fred Bromley**	Sydney Shawcross (Lib)	John Fitz-Gibbon	David Gray (SC)
Nudgee	Labor	**Jack Melloy**	Kenneth Nugent (Lib)		William Hill (CPA)
Nundah	Liberal	John Carey	**William Knox** (Lib)	Michael Green	
Port Curtis	Labor	**Martin Hanson**	James Grant (CP); John McGee (Lib)		
Redcliffe	Country	William Hunter	Robert Elder (Lib); **Jim Houghton*** (CP)	James Morrissey	
Rockhampton North	Labor	**Merv Thackeray**	Robert Woodrow (Lib)	Iris Burke	
Rockhampton South	Liberal	Kevin Charles	**Rex Pilbeam** (Lib)	Peter Boyle	
Roma	Country	Marcus Thew	**William Ewan** (CP)		
Salisbury	Labor	**Doug Sherrington**	Keith Brough (Lib)		
Sandgate	Labor	**Harry Dean**	Colin Clark (Lib)	Reginald Lincoln	
Sherwood	Liberal	Gilbert Thorsen	**John Herbert** (Lib)		
Somerset	Country	Jacobus Van Der Lelie	**Harold Richter** (CP)	Naomi Grulke	John Rasmussen (Ind)
South Brisbane	Labor	**Col Bennett**	Cecil Schuurs (Lib)	Mervyn Eunson	Warren Bowden (CPA)
South Coast	Country	Kevin Cummings	Russ Hinze* (CP); Herbert Winders (Lib)	John McWatters	Bernard Elsey (Ind)
Tablelands	Labor	**Edwin Wallis-Smith**	Tom Gilmore (CP)	V Rehbein	
Toowong	Liberal	Douglas Wallace	Charles Porter (Lib)	Brian O'Brien	
Toowoomba East	Liberal	Peter Wood	John McCafferty (CP); Lawrence Storey (Lib)	Francis Mullins	Gladys O'Sullivan (Ind)
Toowoomba West	Labor	**Jack Duggan**	Clifford Leavy (Lib)	Terry Morris	
Townsville North	Labor	**Perc Tucker**	Robert Bonnett (Lib)	L J McManus	
Townsville South	Independent	Arthur Trower			**Tom Aikens*** (Ind); Francis Bishop (CPA)
Warrego	Labor	**John Dufficy**			
Warwick	Country	Eric Barrett	**David Cory** (CP)	Daniel Skehan	
Wavell	Liberal	Herbert Bromley	**Alex Dewar** (Lib)	Thomas Grundy	Desmond Fulton (Ind); Mervyn Goldstiver (SC)
Whitsunday	Country	Bernard Kirwan	**Ron Camm** (CP)	Bernard Lewis	
Windsor	Liberal	Keith Fordyce	**Ray Smith** (Lib)	Vincent Wenck	
Wynnum	Labor	Ted Harris	Ian Beath (Lib)	Terence Burns	Stella Nord (CPA)
Yeronga	Liberal	Jack Davis	**Norm Lee** (Lib)	John Lamberth	

== See also ==
- 1966 Queensland state election
- Members of the Queensland Legislative Assembly, 1963–1966
- Members of the Queensland Legislative Assembly, 1966–1969
- List of political parties in Australia
