= Candidates of the 1969 Queensland state election =

Overview of electoral candidates for the 1969 Queensland state election

The 1969 Queensland state election was held on 17 May 1969.

== Retiring Members ==
=== Labor ===
- Peter Byrne MLA (Mourilyan)
- Jim Donald MLA (Ipswich East)
- John Dufficy MLA (Warrego)
- Jack Duggan MLA (Toowoomba West)
- Fred Graham MLA (Mackay)
- Johnno Mann MLA (Brisbane)

=== Country ===
- Eddie Beardmore MLA (Balonne)
- Alf Muller MLA (Fassifern)

=== Liberal ===
- Ray Smith MLA (Windsor)

=== Independent ===
- Bunny Adair MLA (Cook)
- Arthur Coburn MLA (Burdekin)
- Ted Walsh MLA (Bundaberg)

== Candidates ==
Sitting members at the time of the election are shown in bold text.

Electorate	Held by	Labor candidate	Coalition candidate	DLP candidate	Other candidates
Albert	Country	William Wollstein	**Cec Carey*** (CP); Paul Scanlan (Lib)	Brian Balaam	Ernest Harley (Ind); William Steer (Ind)
Ashgrove	Liberal	Haydn Sargent	**Douglas Tooth** (Lib)	George Cook	
Aspley	Liberal	Roy Harvey	**Fred Campbell** (Lib)	Anthony Macklin	
Aubigny	DLP	Thomas Wilson	Peter Paull (CP)	**Les Diplock**	
Balonne	Country	Ben Ward	Harold Hungerford (CP)		
Barambah	Country	Norman Hasemann	**Joh Bjelke-Petersen** (CP)		
Barcoo	Labor	**Eugene O'Donnell**	Harold Braun (CP)	Edwin Eshmann	
Baroona	Labor	**Pat Hanlon**	Thomas Bence (Lib)	Anthony Machin	
Belmont	Labor	**Fred Newton**	Cyril Morgan (Lib)	John Taylor	
Bowen	Liberal	Leonard Bidgood	**Peter Delamothe** (Lib)		
Brisbane	Labor	Brian Davis	Neville Jackson (Lib)	Patrick Hallinan	
Bulimba	Labor	**Jack Houston**	Megan Wilding (Lib)	Paul Tucker	
Bundaberg	Independent	Lou Jensen	Paul Neville (CP); Stanley Smith (Lib)	William Hutchinson	Seth Cottell (Ind); Clifford Nielsen (Ind)
Burdekin	Independent	Ronald Nuttall	Val Bird* (CP); Stanley Pearce (Lib)	Emil Liebrecht	
Burke	Labor	**Alec Inch**	William Aplin (CP)		John Donaldson (SC)
Burnett	Country	Alexander Craig	**Claude Wharton** (CP)		
Cairns	Labor	**Ray Jones**	David De Jarlais (Lib); Victor Piccone (CP)	Edward Svendsen	Phyllis Penridge (Ind)
Callide	Country	Charles Tutt	**Vince Jones** (CP)	Edgar Lanigan	Edgar Shields (Ind)
Carnarvon	Country	Arthur Johnson	**Henry McKechnie** (CP)	Frederick Burges	
Chatsworth	Liberal	John Cleary	**Bill Hewitt** (Lib)	Leonard Galligan	
Clayfield	Liberal	David Hunter	**John Murray** (Lib)	Francis Andrews	
Condamine	Country	Nico Bos	**Vic Sullivan** (CP)		
Cook	Independent	Bill Wood	James Bidner (CP)	Thomas White	John Allan (Ind); Ernest Hall (Ind)
Cooroora	Country	Lutgerdienko Hoiting	**David Low** (CP)	Alexander Browne	
Cunningham	Country	Nelson Mann	**Alan Fletcher** (CP)	Eugene Connolly	
Fassifern	Country	Jack Jones	Selwyn Muller (CP)	Gordon Blain	Victor Robb (SC)
Flinders	Country	Douglas Lloyd	**Bill Longeran** (CP)		
Greenslopes	Liberal	Kath Walker	**Keith Hooper** (Lib)	Harry Wright	
Gregory	Country	John Thomas	**Wally Rae** (CP)		
Gympie	Country	Jack Ison	**Max Hodges** (CP)	Denis Tanner	Cecil Rivers (Ind); Bernard Thomas (Ind)
Hawthorne	Liberal	Ernest Adsett	**Bill Kaus** (Lib)	James Moss	
Hinchinbrook	Country	Frederick Page	**John Row** (CP)	John Williams	
Ipswich East	Labor	Evan Marginson	John Shapcott (Lib)	Peter Grant	
Ipswich West	Labor	**Vi Jordan**	Allan Whybird (Lib)	Francis Carroll	
Isis	Labor	**Jim Blake**	Harold Bonanno (CP)	Matthews Minnegal	
Ithaca	Liberal	Sylvester Martin	**Col Miller** (Lib)	Anne Wenck	
Kedron	Labor	**Eric Lloyd**	William Battershill (Lib)	Gavan Duffy	
Kurilpa	Liberal	Ian Brusasco	**Clive Hughes** (Lib)	Edward Doherty	
Landsborough	Country	Peter Venning	**Mike Ahern** (CP)		Basil Nettleton (Ind)
Lockyer	Liberal		**Gordon Chalk** (Lib)	Bailey Pashley	James Ryan (Ind)
Logan	Country	Ted Baldwin	**Dick Wood** (CP)	Michael Scragg	
Mackay	Labor	Ed Casey	Robert Gray (Lib)		Thomas McCanna (Ind)
Mackenzie	Country	Harold Kuhn	**Nev Hewitt** (CP)		
Maryborough	Labor	**Horace Davies**	Ralph Stafford (Lib)	Brian Hawes	
Merthyr	Liberal	Brian Mellifont	**Sam Ramsden** (Lib)	Maurice O'Connor	
Mirani	Country	Gustav Creber	**Tom Newbery** (CP)		
Mount Coot-tha	Liberal	Con Sciacca	**Bill Lickiss** (Lib)	Andrew Aitken	
Mount Gravatt	Liberal	James Kennedy	**Geoff Chinchen** (Lib)	Patrick O'Reilly	
Mourilyan	Labor	Peter Moore	Arnold Palmer (CP)	Geoffrey Higham	
Mulgrave	Country	Leslie Trembath	**Roy Armstrong** (CP)		
Murrumba	Country	Reginald O'Brien	**David Nicholson** (CP)	Robert Macklin	
Norman	Labor	**Fred Bromley**	Ross Cameron (Lib)	Maurice Sheehan	
Nudgee	Labor	**Jack Melloy**	Robert Harper (Lib)	David Mapstone	Hubert Giesberts (SC)
Nundah	Liberal	Roderick Blundell	**William Knox** (Lib)	Brian Barlow	
Port Curtis	Labor	**Martin Hanson**		Marguerita Glen	
Redcliffe	Country	Jack Trueman	**Jim Houghton** (CP)	James Morrissey	
Rockhampton North	Labor	**Merv Thackeray**	Philip German (Lib)	John Dunn	
Rockhampton South	Liberal	Keith Wright	**Rex Pilbeam** (Lib)	Peter Boyle	
Roma	Country	Marcus Thew	**Ken Tomkins** (CP)		Ronald Alford (Ind)
Salisbury	Labor	**Doug Sherrington**	George Whyte (Lib)	Miroslav Jansky	
Sandgate	Labor	**Harry Dean**	Colin Clark (Lib)	Bernard Beston	
Sherwood	Liberal	Robert Wilson	**John Herbert** (Lib)	Clarice Weedon	
Somerset	Country	Norman Cush	**Harold Richter** (CP)		
South Brisbane	Labor	**Col Bennett**	Alan Brown (Lib)	John O'Connell	Victor Slater (SPA)
South Coast	Country	Frank Culell	Bruce Bishop (Lib); **Russ Hinze*** (CP)	Laurence Kehoe	Dino Bertoldo (Ind); John Lee (Ind)
Tablelands	Labor	**Edwin Wallis-Smith**	Micheli Borzi (CP)		
Toowong	Liberal	Ian Hinckfuss	**Charles Porter** (Lib)	Brian O'Brien	
Toowoomba East	Labor	**Peter Wood**	Sydney Goodrick (Lib)	Francis Mullins	
Toowoomba West	Labor	Ray Bousen	John Peel (CP); Leigh Wallman (Lib)	John Davis	
Townsville North	Labor	**Perc Tucker**	Owen Griffiths (CP); Keith Rundle (Lib)	Peter Flanagan	
Townsville South	Independent	Leslie Moon		Bryan Hurney	**Tom Aikens*** (Ind); Francis Bishop (CPA)
Warrego	Labor	Jack Aiken	Robert Anson (CP)		Jack Tonkin (Ind)
Warwick	Country	Raymond Lyons	**David Cory** (CP)	Daniel Skehan	
Wavell	Liberal	Herbert Bromley	Arthur Crawford (Lib)	Rogers Judge	**Alex Dewar** (Ind)
Whitsunday	Country	Elwyn Uprichard	**Ron Camm** (CP)	Bernard Lewis	
Windsor	Liberal	Keith Fordyce	Bob Moore (Lib)	John Dawson	
Wynnum	Labor	**Ted Harris**	Noel Justo (Lib)	Gordon Randall	R A Annear (CPA)
Yeronga	Liberal	Malcolm Campbell	**Norm Lee** (Lib)	Jonyth Mapstone	

== See also ==
- 1969 Queensland state election
- Members of the Queensland Legislative Assembly, 1966–1969
- Members of the Queensland Legislative Assembly, 1969–1972
- List of political parties in Australia
