= Results of the 1966 Queensland state election =

Queensland state election, 28 May 1966 Legislative Assembly << 1963–1969 >>
Enrolled voters	870,869				
Votes cast	812,235		Turnout	93.27	–0.02
Informal votes	13,262		Informal	1.63	+0.07
Summary of votes by party
Party	Primary votes	%	Swing	Seats	Change
Labor	350,254	43.84	+0.01	26	±0
Liberal	203,648	25.49	+1.73	20	±0
Country	154,081	19.28	–1.03	27	+1
Queensland Labor	49,948	6.25	–0.97	1	±0
Independent	38,001	4.76	+0.20	5	–1
Total	798,973			78	

This is a list of electoral district results for the 1966 Queensland state election.

== Results by electoral district ==
=== Albert ===
1966 Queensland state election: Albert
Party	Candidate	Votes	%	±%
Country	Cec Carey	4,624	41.7	−2.7
Liberal	Ernest Harley	3,686	33.3	+33.3
Labor	Harold Evans	2,324	21.0	−0.5
Queensland Labor	Patrick Hallinan	449	4.0	+4.0
Total formal votes		11,083	99.1	−0.2
Informal votes		105	0.9	+0.2
Turnout		11,188	92.1	−1.0
Two-candidate-preferred result
Country	Cec Carey	5,566	50.2	−5.7
Liberal	Ernest Harley	5,517	49.8	+49.8
Country hold		Swing	−5.7	

=== Ashgrove ===
1966 Queensland state election: Ashgrove
Party	Candidate	Votes	%	±%
Liberal	Douglas Tooth	5,524	53.9	−0.8
Labor	Richard Gill	3,695	36.0	+0.4
Queensland Labor	George Cook	1,035	10.1	+0.4
Total formal votes		10,254	98.3	−0.4
Informal votes		173	1.7	+0.4
Turnout		10,427	94.3	−1.3
Two-party-preferred result
Liberal	Douglas Tooth	6,275	61.2	−0.6
Labor	Richard Gill	3,979	38.8	+0.6
Liberal hold		Swing	−0.6	

=== Aspley ===
1966 Queensland state election: Aspley
Party	Candidate	Votes	%	±%
Liberal	Fred Campbell	8,633	52.4	+1.4
Labor	John Purtell	6,408	38.9	−0.8
Queensland Labor	Rogers Judge	1,444	8.7	−0.7
Total formal votes		16,485	98.8	−0.3
Informal votes		191	1.2	+0.3
Turnout		16,676	94.3	−1.0
Two-party-preferred result
Liberal	Fred Campbell	9,808	59.5	+0.6
Labor	John Purtell	6,677	40.5	−0.6
Liberal hold		Swing	+0.6	

=== Aubigny ===
1966 Queensland state election: Aubigny
Party	Candidate	Votes	%	±%
Queensland Labor	Les Diplock	5,123	56.3	+3.9
Country	John Corfe	2,828	31.1	−3.0
Labor	Peter Fitzpatrick	1,150	12.6	−0.9
Total formal votes		9,101	98.8	−0.2
Informal votes		113	1.2	+0.2
Turnout		9,214	95.4	−0.6
Two-candidate-preferred result
Queensland Labor	Les Diplock	5,697	62.6	+3.0
Country	John Corfe	3,404	37.4	−3.0
Queensland Labor hold		Swing	+3.0	

=== Balonne ===
1966 Queensland state election: Balonne
Party	Candidate	Votes	%	±%
Country	Eddie Beardmore	4,059	62.7	−3.0
Labor	Ben Ward	2,414	37.3	+3.0
Total formal votes		6,473	99.0	−0.1
Informal votes		63	1.0	+0.1
Turnout		6,536	89.0	−1.7
Country hold		Swing	−3.0	

=== Barambah ===
1966 Queensland state election: Barambah
Party	Candidate	Votes	%	±%
Country	Joh Bjelke-Petersen	6,659	74.2	+11.3
Labor	Norman Hasemann	2,315	25.8	+0.4
Total formal votes		8,884	98.6	−0.4
Informal votes		125	1.4	+0.4
Turnout		9,009	95.9	−0.7
Country hold		Swing	+1.9	

=== Barcoo ===
1966 Queensland state election: Barcoo
Party	Candidate	Votes	%	±%
Labor	Eugene O'Donnell	4,575	59.0	−5.2
Country	Michael Cronin	2,721	35.1	−0.7
Queensland Labor	Edward Eshmann	457	5.9	+5.9
Total formal votes		7,693	98.6	−0.3
Informal votes		166	1.4	+0.3
Turnout		7,859	92.2	−0.9
Two-party-preferred result
Labor	Eugene O'Donnell	4,660	60.1	−4.1
Country	Michael Cronin	3,093	39.9	+4.1
Labor hold		Swing	−4.1	

=== Baroona ===
1966 Queensland state election: Baroona
Party	Candidate	Votes	%	±%
Labor	Pat Hanlon	6,359	59.7	−1.7
Liberal	Ian Barron	3,313	31.1	+1.7
Queensland Labor	Anthony Machin	822	7.7	+0.7
Communist	Brian Moynihan	151	1.4	−0.8
Total formal votes		9,645	96.9	−0.3
Informal votes		342	3.1	+0.3
Turnout		9,987	91.7	−1.3
Two-party-preferred result
Labor	Pat Hanlon	6,633	62.3	−1.5
Liberal	Ian Barron	4,012	37.7	+1.5
Labor hold		Swing	−1.5	

=== Belmont ===
1966 Queensland state election: Belmont
Party	Candidate	Votes	%	±%
Labor	Fred Newton	8,898	58.0	−1.3
Liberal	Oswald Brunner	5,494	35.8	+1.1
Queensland Labor	John Taylor	951	6.2	+0.2
Total formal votes		15,343	98.2	+0.1
Informal votes		280	1.8	−0.1
Turnout		15,623	94.1	−1.0
Two-party-preferred result
Labor	Fred Newton	9,075	60.1	+0.3
Liberal	Oswald Brunner	6,268	39.9	−0.3
Labor hold		Swing	+0.3	

=== Bowen ===
1966 Queensland state election: Bowen
Party	Candidate	Votes	%	±%
Liberal	Peter Delamothe	3,632	51.2	+4.7
Labor	John Gralton	3,080	43.4	−3.4
Queensland Labor	James McCane	382	5.4	−1.3
Total formal votes		7,094	98.7	+0.4
Informal votes		93	1.3	−0.4
Turnout		7,187	95.4	0.0
Two-party-preferred result
Liberal	Peter Delamothe	3,943	55.6	+3.7
Labor	John Gralton	3,151	44.4	−3.7
Liberal hold		Swing	+3.7	

=== Brisbane ===
1966 Queensland state election: Brisbane
Party	Candidate	Votes	%	±%
Labor	Johnno Mann	4,726	55.9	+0.8
Liberal	Brian Cahill	2,749	32.5	−0.7
Queensland Labor	John O'Connell	983	11.6	0.0
Total formal votes		8,458	96.1	−0.6
Informal votes		347	3.9	+0.6
Turnout		8,805	86.0	−3.6
Two-party-preferred result
Labor	Johnno Mann	4,909	58.0	+0.7
Liberal	Brian Cahill	3,549	42.0	−0.7
Labor hold		Swing	+0.7	

=== Bulimba ===
1966 Queensland state election: Bulimba
Party	Candidate	Votes	%	±%
Labor	Jack Houston	7,788	63.8	+0.9
Liberal	Brian Perkins	3,738	30.6	−0.1
Queensland Labor	Paul Tucker	691	5.7	−0.7
Total formal votes		12,217	98.6	+0.4
Informal votes		173	1.4	−0.4
Turnout		12,390	94.8	−0.9
Two-party-preferred result
Labor	Jack Houston	7,917	64.8	+0.7
Liberal	Brian Perkins	4,300	35.2	−0.7
Labor hold		Swing	+0.7	

=== Bundaberg ===
1966 Queensland state election: Bundaberg
Party	Candidate	Votes	%	±%
Independent	Ted Walsh	7,492	53.5	0.0
Labor	Matt Tallon	6,516	46.5	0.0
Total formal votes		14,008	99.1	+0.2
Informal votes		133	0.9	−0.2
Turnout		14,141	93.8	−1.1
Independent hold		Swing	0.0	

=== Burdekin ===
1966 Queensland state election: Burdekin
Party	Candidate	Votes	%	±%
Independent	Arthur Coburn	3,318	45.6	−10.6
Labor	Herbert O'Brien	1,739	23.9	−4.3
Liberal	Stanley Pearce	1,415	19.4	+19.4
Queensland Labor	Oliver Anderson	810	11.1	−4.6
Total formal votes		7,282	98.3	+0.2
Informal votes		124	1.7	−0.2
Turnout		7,406	94.4	−0.5
Two-candidate-preferred result
Independent	Arthur Coburn	4,262	58.5	−5.5
Liberal	Stanley Pearce	3,020	41.5	+41.5
Independent hold		Swing	−5.5	

=== Burke ===
1966 Queensland state election: Burke
Party	Candidate	Votes	%	±%
Labor	Alec Inch	4,394	62.6	−37.4
Liberal	William Presley	1,718	24.5	+24.5
Social Credit	John Donaldson	909	12.9	+12.9
Total formal votes		7,021	97.5	
Informal votes		180	2.5	
Turnout		7,201	81.3	
Two-party-preferred result
Labor	Alec Inch	4,848	69.0	−31.0
Liberal	William Presley	2,173	31.0	+31.0
Labor hold		Swing	−31.0	

=== Burnett ===
1966 Queensland state election: Burnett
Party	Candidate	Votes	%	±%
Country	Claude Wharton	5,934	63.6	−1.5
Labor	Alexander Craig	3,402	36.4	+1.5
Total formal votes		9,336	98.9	−0.1
Informal votes		106	1.1	+0.1
Turnout		9,442	94.6	−0.7
Country hold		Swing	−1.5	

=== Cairns ===
1966 Queensland state election: Cairns
Party	Candidate	Votes	%	±%
Labor	Ray Jones	6,343	51.3	−13.5
Liberal	David De Jarlais	2,224	18.0	+18.0
Independent	Colin Penridge	2,036	16.5	+16.5
Country	John Franzmann	1,550	12.5	−16.8
Queensland Labor	Arthur Trembath	203	1.6	−4.3
Total formal votes		12,356	96.0	−1.8
Informal votes		519	4.0	+1.8
Turnout		12,875	93.4	+0.6
Two-party-preferred result
Labor	Ray Jones	7,616	61.6	−4.3
Liberal	David De Jarlais	4,740	38.4	+4.3
Labor hold		Swing	−4.3	

=== Callide ===
1966 Queensland state election: Callide
Party	Candidate	Votes	%	±%
Country	Vince Jones	4,547	53.8	+8.3
Labor	Wilfred Prisgrove	2,809	33.2	+1.4
Queensland Labor	Edgar Lanigan	1,102	13.0	+7.5
Total formal votes		8,458	98.7	+0.1
Informal votes		115	1.3	−0.1
Turnout		8,573	93.7	−1.4
Two-party-preferred result
Country	Vince Jones	5,444	64.4	+1.1
Labor	Wilfred Prisgrove	3,014	35.6	−1.1
Country hold		Swing	+1.1	

=== Carnarvon ===
1966 Queensland state election: Carnarvon
Party	Candidate	Votes	%	±%
Country	Henry McKechnie	4,922	56.8	+20.4
Labor	Douglas Gow	2,455	28.3	+0.1
Queensland Labor	Frederick Burges	1,286	14.8	−20.6
Total formal votes		8,663	98.4	+0.2
Informal votes		144	1.6	−0.2
Turnout		8,807	93.5	−0.8
Two-party-preferred result
Country	Henry McKechnie	5,856	67.6	+13.7
Labor	Douglas Gow	2,807	32.4	+32.4
Country hold		Swing	+13.7	

=== Chatsworth ===
1966 Queensland state election: Chatsworth
Party	Candidate	Votes	%	±%
Liberal	Bill Hewitt	5,149	49.3	−4.6
Labor	John Cleary	4,170	40.0	+0.3
Queensland Labor	Vincent Garrigan	675	6.5	0.0
Independent	Douglas Wallace	445	4.3	+4.3
Total formal votes		10,439	98.3	−0.6
Informal votes		175	1.7	+0.6
Turnout		10,614	95.3	+0.1
Two-party-preferred result
Liberal	Bill Hewitt	5,895	56.5	−2.6
Labor	John Cleary	4,544	43.5	+2.6
Liberal hold		Swing	−2.6	

=== Clayfield ===
1966 Queensland state election: Clayfield
Party	Candidate	Votes	%	±%
Liberal	John Murray	5,688	56.2	+0.3
Labor	Bruce Strachan	3,356	33.2	−0.6
Queensland Labor	Mary Ryan	1,074	10.6	+0.3
Total formal votes		10,118	97.8	−0.8
Informal votes		222	2.2	+0.8
Turnout		10,340	92.4	−2.1
Two-party-preferred result
Liberal	John Murray	6,562	64.9	+0.6
Labor	Bruce Strachan	3,556	35.1	−0.6
Liberal hold		Swing	+0.6	

=== Condamine ===
1966 Queensland state election: Condamine
Party	Candidate	Votes	%	±%
Country	Vic Sullivan	5,252	77.3	+4.3
Labor	Roderick Blundell	1,539	22.7	−4.3
Total formal votes		6,791	99.0	0.0
Informal votes		70	1.0	0.0
Turnout		6,861	94.7	−0.5
Country hold		Swing	+4.3	

=== Cook ===
1966 Queensland state election: Cook
Party	Candidate	Votes	%	±%
Independent	Bunny Adair	6,097	55.2	+0.5
Labor	Jack Bethel	4,951	44.8	−0.5
Total formal votes		11,048	98.5	+0.8
Informal votes		172	1.5	−0.8
Turnout		11,220	91.3	+0.2
Independent hold		Swing	+0.5	

=== Cooroora ===
1966 Queensland state election: Cooroora
Party	Candidate	Votes	%	±%
Country	David Low	5,716	60.0	−1.8
Labor	Kenneth Kliese	3,813	40.0	+8.8
Total formal votes		9,529	98.8	+0.2
Informal votes		111	1.2	−0.2
Turnout		9,640	93.7	−0.9
Country hold		Swing	−7.8	

=== Cunningham ===
1966 Queensland state election: Cunningham
Party	Candidate	Votes	%	±%
Country	Alan Fletcher	5,379	72.2	−0.6
Labor	Brian Davis	1,223	16.4	−4.5
Queensland Labor	Alexander Browne	847	11.4	+5.1
Total formal votes		7,449	99.3	+0.2
Informal votes		49	0.7	−0.2
Turnout		7,498	95.7	+1.0
Two-party-preferred result
Country	Alan Fletcher	5,994	80.5	+2.6
Labor	Brian Davis	1,455	19.5	−2.6
Country hold		Swing	+2.6	

=== Fassifern ===
1966 Queensland state election: Fassifern
Party	Candidate	Votes	%	±%
Country	Alf Muller	5,713	63.9	+28.4
Labor	Denis O'Brien	2,483	27.8	+2.2
Queensland Labor	Gordon Blain	532	6.0	+0.5
Social Credit	Victor Robb	206	2.3	+2.3
Total formal votes		8,934	98.7	0.0
Informal votes		116	1.3	0.0
Turnout		9,050	95.4	−1.3
Two-party-preferred result
Country	Alf Muller	6,264	70.1	+27.8
Labor	Denis O'Brien	2,670	29.9	+29.9
Country gain from Independent		Swing	+27.8	

=== Flinders ===
1966 Queensland state election: Flinders
Party	Candidate	Votes	%	±%
Country	Bill Longeran	4,483	61.4	+6.0
Labor	Peter McKitrick	2,516	34.5	−6.3
Queensland Labor	John Judge	223	3.1	−0.7
Independent	Charles Rowe	73	1.0	+1.0
Total formal votes		7,295	98.4	−0.3
Informal votes		119	1.6	+0.3
Turnout		7,414	90.6	−1.0
Two-party-preferred result
Country	Bill Longeran	4,708	64.5	+5.9
Labor	Peter McKitrick	2,587	35.5	−5.9
Country hold		Swing	+5.9	

=== Greenslopes ===
1966 Queensland state election: Greenslopes
Party	Candidate	Votes	%	±%
Liberal	Keith Hooper	6,074	54.8	−1.6
Labor	Cecil Chandler	3,952	35.7	+0.9
Queensland Labor	Harry Wright	1,054	9.5	+2.2
Total formal votes		11,080	98.7	+0.6
Informal votes		150	1.3	−0.6
Turnout		11,230	93.9	−1.1
Two-party-preferred result
Liberal	Keith Hooper	6,932	62.6	−0.3
Labor	Cecil Chandler	4,148	37.4	+0.3
Liberal hold		Swing	−0.3	

=== Gregory ===
1966 Queensland state election: Gregory
Party	Candidate	Votes	%	±%
Country	Wally Rae	3,844	59.1	+6.9
Labor	Gilbert Burns	2,482	38.2	−4.4
Queensland Labor	David Parker	180	2.8	−2.4
Total formal votes		6,506	99.1	+0.5
Informal votes		59	0.9	−0.5
Turnout		6,565	86.2	−1.4
Two-party-preferred result
Country	Wally Rae	3,991	61.3	+5.3
Labor	Gilbert Burns	2,515	38.7	−5.3
Country hold		Swing	+5.3	

=== Gympie ===
1966 Queensland state election: Gympie
Party	Candidate	Votes	%	±%
Country	Max Hodges	5,489	57.3	+0.2
Labor	Marcus Dower	3,432	35.8	+2.3
Queensland Labor	Denis Tanner	664	6.9	−2.5
Total formal votes		9,585	99.1	0.0
Informal votes		90	0.9	0.0
Turnout		9,675	95.9	−0.1
Two-party-preferred result
Country	Max Hodges	6,029	62.9	−1.8
Labor	Marcus Dower	3,556	37.1	+1.8
Country hold		Swing	−1.8	

=== Hawthorne ===
1966 Queensland state election: Hawthorne
Party	Candidate	Votes	%	±%
Labor	Thomas Burton	4,263	40.5	−10.9
Liberal	Bill Kaus	3,929	37.3	−2.8
Independent	Bill Baxter	1,546	14.7	+14.7
Queensland Labor	Greg Kehoe	789	7.5	−1.0
Total formal votes		10,527	98.4	−0.2
Informal votes		167	1.6	+0.2
Turnout		10,694	94.1	−1.3
Two-party-preferred result
Liberal	Bill Kaus	5,524	52.5	+5.5
Labor	Thomas Burton	5,003	47.5	−5.5
Liberal gain from Labor		Swing	+5.5	

=== Hinchinbrook ===
1966 Queensland state election: Hinchinbrook
Party	Candidate	Votes	%	±%
Country	John Row	4,943	63.1	+6.3
Labor	Natale Palanza	2,312	29.5	−3.8
Queensland Labor	John Williams	576	7.4	+0.4
Total formal votes		7,831	97.1	−0.5
Informal votes		235	2.9	+0.5
Turnout		8,066	93.3	−0.9
Two-party-preferred result
Country	John Row	5,412	69.1	+6.0
Labor	Natale Palanza	2,419	30.9	−6.0
Country hold		Swing	+6.0	

=== Ipswich East ===
1966 Queensland state election: Ipswich East
Party	Candidate	Votes	%	±%
Labor	Jim Donald	9,845	68.5	−1.9
Liberal	Hedley Scriven	3,506	24.4	−2.2
Independent	Douglas Wood	1,014	7.1	+7.1
Total formal votes		14,365	98.5	−0.5
Informal votes		217	1.5	+0.5
Turnout		14,582	90.4	−5.2
Two-party-preferred result
Labor	Jim Donald	10,453	72.8	+1.7
Liberal	Hedley Scriven	3,912	27.2	−1.7
Labor hold		Swing	+1.7	

=== Ipswich West ===
1966 Queensland state election: Ipswich West
Party	Candidate	Votes	%	±%
Labor	Vi Jordan	6,211	47.5	−16.3
Independent	James Finimore	4,140	31.7	+31.7
Liberal	Allan Whybird	2,421	18.5	−12.4
Queensland Labor	Leonard Maguire	305	2.3	−3.1
Total formal votes		13,077	98.7	−0.3
Informal votes		170	1.3	+0.3
Turnout		13,247	90.4	−2.6
Two-candidate-preferred result
Labor	Vi Jordan	6,652	50.9	−13.9
Independent	James Finimore	6,425	49.1	+49.1
Labor hold		Swing	−13.9	

=== Isis ===
1966 Queensland state election: Isis
Party	Candidate	Votes	%	±%
Country	Jack Pizzey	5,111	57.7	0.0
Labor	George Hooper	3,131	35.3	+0.7
Queensland Labor	Brian Hawes	617	7.0	+4.2
Total formal votes		8,859	98.2	+0.1
Informal votes		163	1.8	−0.1
Turnout		9,022	94.6	+0.6
Two-party-preferred result
Country	Jack Pizzey	5,561	62.8	+0.6
Labor	George Hooper	3,298	37.2	−0.6
Country hold		Swing	+0.6	

==== By-election ====
- This by-election was caused by the death of Jack Pizzey. It was held on 16 November 1968.

1968 Isis state by-election
Party	Candidate	Votes	%	±%
Labor	Jim Blake	4,410	51.1	+15.8
Country	Ronald Lester	4,224	48.9	−8.8
Total formal votes		8,634	99.0	+0.8
Informal votes		88	1.0	−0.8
Turnout		8,722	88.9	−5.7
Labor gain from Country		Swing	+13.9	

=== Ithaca ===
1966 Queensland state election: Ithaca
Party	Candidate	Votes	%	±%
Liberal	Col Miller	5,225	49.0	−2.2
Labor	Samuel Hudson	4,363	40.9	+2.6
Queensland Labor	James Ashe	1,069	10.0	+1.0
Total formal votes		10,657	98.5	+0.4
Informal votes		165	1.5	−0.4
Turnout		10,822	93.7	−0.3
Two-party-preferred result
Liberal	Col Miller	5,988	56.2	−2.3
Labor	Samuel Hudson	4,669	43.8	+2.3
Liberal hold		Swing	−2.3	

=== Kedron ===
1966 Queensland state election: Kedron
Party	Candidate	Votes	%	±%
Labor	Eric Lloyd	7,682	60.5	+2.1
Liberal	Christian Jesberg	3,901	30.7	+1.4
Queensland Labor	Edward Doherty	1,121	8.8	+1.3
Total formal votes		12,704	98.5	−0.1
Informal votes		188	1.5	+0.1
Turnout		12,892	94.8	−1.2
Two-party-preferred result
Labor	Eric Lloyd	7,859	61.9	−0.4
Liberal	Christian Jesberg	4,845	38.1	+0.4
Labor hold		Swing	−0.4	

=== Kurilpa ===
1966 Queensland state election: Kurilpa
Party	Candidate	Votes	%	±%
Liberal	Clive Hughes	5,203	53.8	−2.4
Labor	Leslie Buckley	3,926	40.6	+4.8
Queensland Labor	Felix Doolan	458	4.7	−1.9
Social Credit	William Smith	89	0.9	−0.4
Total formal votes		9,676	96.8	−0.9
Informal votes		320	3.2	+0.9
Turnout		9,996	94.1	+0.8
Two-party-preferred result
Liberal	Clive Hughes	5,621	58.1	−4.2
Labor	Leslie Buckley	4,055	41.9	+4.2
Liberal hold		Swing	−4.2	

=== Landsborough ===
1966 Queensland state election: Landsborough
Party	Candidate	Votes	%	±%
Country	Frank Nicklin	6,858	71.3	−2.3
Labor	Frank Freemantle	2,766	28.7	+2.3
Total formal votes		9,624	98.5	−0.7
Informal votes		150	1.5	+0.7
Turnout		9,774	94.1	−0.7
Country hold		Swing	−2.3	

==== By-election ====
- This by-election was caused by the resignation of Frank Nicklin. It was held on 16 March 1968.

1968 Landsborough state by-election
Party	Candidate	Votes	%	±%
Country	Mike Ahern	4,960	51.7	−19.6
Labor	Francis Freemantle	6,814	29.3	+0.6
Independent Liberal	Peter Nelson-Gracie	1,820	19.0	+19.0
Total formal votes		9,594	97.1	−1.4
Informal votes		282	2.9	+1.4
Turnout		9,876	87.9	−6.2
Country hold		Swing	N/A	

- Preferences were not distributed.

=== Lockyer ===
1966 Queensland state election: Lockyer
Party	Candidate	Votes	%	±%
Liberal	Gordon Chalk	5,473	66.9	+5.3
Labor	James Keim	2,705	33.1	+1.1
Total formal votes		8,178	99.4	0.0
Informal votes		45	0.6	0.0
Turnout		8,223	95.9	−0.7
Liberal hold		Swing	+0.4	

=== Logan ===
1966 Queensland state election: Logan
Party	Candidate	Votes	%	±%
Labor	William Ware	4,129	37.2	−1.0
Country	Dick Wood	3,516	31.7	−26.5
Liberal	Francis Dennis	2,199	19.8	+19.8
Independent	Laurence Storey	926	8.3	+8.3
Queensland Labor	Maurice Sheehan	197	1.8	−1.8
Social Credit	Paul Kenealy	135	1.2	+1.2
Total formal votes		11,102	96.8	−1.4
Informal votes		362	3.2	+1.4
Turnout		11,464	93.4	−0.2
Two-party-preferred result
Country	Dick Wood	5,903	53.2	−8.0
Labor	William Ware	5,199	46.8	+8.0
Country hold		Swing	−8.0	

=== Mackay ===
1966 Queensland state election: Mackay
Party	Candidate	Votes	%	±%
Labor	Fred Graham	5,604	59.3	+5.8
Country	Roylance Eastment	2,932	31.0	−6.1
Queensland Labor	T.J. Hayes	918	9.7	+0.3
Total formal votes		9,454	98.6	+0.2
Informal votes		137	1.4	−0.2
Turnout		9,591	92.6	−2.3
Two-party-preferred result
Labor	Fred Graham	5,775	61.1	+5.9
Country	Roylance Eastment	3,679	38.9	−5.9
Labor hold		Swing	+5.9	

=== Mackenzie ===
1966 Queensland state election: Mackenzie
Party	Candidate	Votes	%	±%
Country	Neville Hewitt	unopposed		
Country hold		Swing		

=== Maryborough ===
1966 Queensland state election: Maryborough
Party	Candidate	Votes	%	±%
Labor	Horace Davies	6,906	61.1	−0.8
Country	Ernest Jurss	3,108	27.5	+1.6
Queensland Labor	William Hutchinson	879	7.8	0.0
Social Credit	Arnold Jones	402	3.6	−0.9
Total formal votes		11,295	98.3	−0.8
Informal votes		196	1.7	+0.8
Turnout		11,491	94.8	−0.6
Two-party-preferred result
Labor	Horace Davies	7,270	64.4	−1.1
Country	Ernest Jurss	4,025	35.6	+1.1
Labor hold		Swing	−1.1	

=== Merthyr ===
1966 Queensland state election: Merthyr
Party	Candidate	Votes	%	±%
Liberal	Sam Ramsden	4,781	51.1	−2.3
Labor	Brian Mellifont	3,745	40.0	+3.0
Queensland Labor	Laurence Kehoe	830	8.9	−0.6
Total formal votes		9,356	97.0	−0.4
Informal votes		284	3.0	+0.4
Turnout		9,640	91.5	0.0
Two-party-preferred result
Liberal	Sam Ramsden	5,384	57.5	−3.7
Labor	Brian Mellifont	3,972	42.5	+3.7
Liberal hold		Swing	−3.7	

=== Mirani ===
1966 Queensland state election: Mirani
Party	Candidate	Votes	%	±%
Country	Tom Newbery	4,094	51.2	−13.6
Labor	Gustav Creber	3,700	46.3	+11.1
Queensland Labor	Edward Relf	196	2.5	+2.5
Total formal votes		7,990	99.1	−0.2
Informal votes		69	0.9	+0.2
Turnout		8,059	95.3	+0.7
Two-party-preferred result
Country	Tom Newbery	4,253	53.2	−11.6
Labor	Gustav Creber	3,737	46.8	+11.6
Country hold		Swing	−11.6	

=== Mount Coot-tha ===
1966 Queensland state election: Mount Coot-tha
Party	Candidate	Votes	%	±%
Liberal	Bill Lickiss	8,522	60.0	+0.3
Labor	Barry Gorman	4,463	31.4	−1.1
Queensland Labor	Maxwell Muller	1,227	8.6	+0.8
Total formal votes		14,212	98.7	+0.7
Informal votes		188	1.3	−0.7
Turnout		14,400	93.7	−1.6
Two-party-preferred result
Liberal	Bill Lickiss	9,520	67.0	+1.0
Labor	Barry Gorman	4,692	33.0	−1.0
Liberal hold		Swing	+1.0	

=== Mount Gravatt ===
1966 Queensland state election: Mount Gravatt
Party	Candidate	Votes	%	±%
Liberal	Geoff Chinchen	8,647	55.9	−0.1
Labor	Peter Rowe	5,464	35.3	−0.5
Queensland Labor	Kenneth Bayliss	1,349	8.7	+0.5
Total formal votes		15,460	98.5	+0.5
Informal votes		240	1.5	−0.5
Turnout		15,700	94.4	−0.9
Two-party-preferred result
Liberal	Geoff Chinchen	9,783	63.3	+1.3
Labor	Peter Rowe	5,677	36.7	−1.3
Liberal hold		Swing	+1.3	

=== Mourilyan ===
1966 Queensland state election: Mourilyan
Party	Candidate	Votes	%	±%
Labor	Peter Byrne	4,683	56.2	−2.5
Country	Alfred Martinuzzi	2,623	31.5	+1.1
Queensland Labor	Geoffrey Higham	1,021	12.3	+1.4
Total formal votes		8,327	97.6	−0.1
Informal votes		202	2.4	+0.1
Turnout		8,529	93.4	−1.1
Two-party-preferred result
Labor	Peter Byrne	4,873	58.5	−2.3
Country	Alfred Martinuzzi	3,454	41.5	+2.3
Labor hold		Swing	−2.3	

=== Mulgrave ===
1966 Queensland state election: Mulgrave
Party	Candidate	Votes	%	±%
Country	Roy Armstrong	3,809	58.2	+0.6
Labor	Stanley Dalton	2,733	41.8	+6.3
Total formal votes		6,542	98.6	+0.8
Informal votes		90	1.4	−0.8
Turnout		6,632	93.5	−0.6
Country hold		Swing	−5.1	

=== Murrumba ===
1966 Queensland state election: Murrumba
Party	Candidate	Votes	%	±%
Labor	Norm Kruger	5,179	41.8	+0.3
Country	David Nicholson	5,116	41.3	−13.3
Liberal	Marshall Cooke	1,489	12.0	+12.0
Independent	David Bishop	321	2.6	+2.6
Queensland Labor	Robert Vlug	272	2.2	−1.0
Total formal votes		12,377	97.5	−0.6
Informal votes		320	2.5	+0.6
Turnout		12,697	94.0	−0.8
Two-party-preferred result
Country	David Nicholson	6,688	54.0	−3.3
Labor	Norm Kruger	5,689	46.0	+3.3
Country hold		Swing	−3.3	

=== Norman ===
1966 Queensland state election: Norman
Party	Candidate	Votes	%	±%
Labor	Fred Bromley	5,080	56.6	+3.4
Liberal	Sydney Shawcross	3,087	34.4	−0.4
Queensland Labor	John Fitz-Gibbon	700	7.8	−2.1
Social Credit	David Gray	107	1.2	−1.8
Total formal votes		8,974	97.8	+0.5
Informal votes		200	2.2	−0.5
Turnout		9,174	92.3	−1.5
Two-party-preferred result
Labor	Fred Bromley	5,264	58.7	+2.2
Liberal	Sydney Shawcross	3,710	41.3	−2.2
Labor hold		Swing	+2.2	

=== Nudgee ===
1966 Queensland state election: Nudgee
Party	Candidate	Votes	%	±%
Labor	Jack Melloy	8,547	63.3	+2.9
Liberal	Kenneth Nugent	4,685	34.7	+3.4
Communist	William Hill	270	2.0	+2.0
Total formal votes		13,502	98.3	+0.3
Informal votes		226	1.7	−0.3
Turnout		13,728	94.9	−0.6
Two-party-preferred result
Labor	Jack Melloy	8,763	64.9	+2.9
Liberal	Kenneth Nugent	4,739	35.1	−2.9
Labor hold		Swing	+2.9	

=== Nundah ===
1966 Queensland state election: Nundah
Party	Candidate	Votes	%	±%
Liberal	William Knox	5,971	51.7	+1.9
Labor	John Carey	4,599	39.9	−0.6
Queensland Labor	Michael Green	972	8.4	−1.3
Total formal votes		11,542	98.8	−0.1
Informal votes		145	1.2	+0.1
Turnout		11,687	93.1	−1.6
Two-party-preferred result
Liberal	William Knox	6,762	58.6	+0.3
Labor	John Carey	4,780	41.4	−0.3
Liberal hold		Swing	+0.3	

=== Port Curtis ===
1966 Queensland state election: Port Curtis
Party	Candidate	Votes	%	±%
Labor	Martin Hanson	6,012	70.0	−10.4
Country	James Grant	1,526	17.8	+17.8
Liberal	John McGree	1,056	12.3	+12.3
Total formal votes		8,594	99.3	+1.1
Informal votes		57	0.7	−1.1
Turnout		8,651	94.6	−1.5
Two-party-preferred result
Labor	Martin Hanson	6,160	71.5	−11.1
Country	James Grant	2,434	28.5	+28.5
Labor hold		Swing	−11.1	

=== Redcliffe ===
1966 Queensland state election: Redcliffe
Party	Candidate	Votes	%	±%
Country	Jim Houghton	5,292	45.1	−10.3
Labor	William Hunter	4,514	38.5	+3.0
Liberal	Robert Elder	1,206	10.3	+10.3
Queensland Labor	James Morrissey	726	6.2	+1.1
Total formal votes		11,738	98.3	+0.1
Informal votes		204	1.7	−0.1
Turnout		11,942	93.0	−1.0
Two-party-preferred result
Country	Jim Houghton	6,895	58.7	−3.0
Labor	William Hunter	4,843	41.3	+3.0
Country hold		Swing	−3.0	

=== Rockhampton North ===
1966 Queensland state election: Rockhampton North
Party	Candidate	Votes	%	±%
Labor	Merv Thackeray	8,221	64.4	−0.5
Liberal	Robert Woodrow	3,450	27.0	−0.1
Queensland Labor	Iris Burke	1,101	8.6	+0.5
Total formal votes		12,772	99.0	+0.4
Informal votes		129	1.0	−0.4
Turnout		12,901	95.8	−0.1
Two-party-preferred result
Labor	Merv Thackeray	8,523	66.7	+0.3
Liberal	Robert Woodrow	4,249	33.3	−0.3
Labor hold		Swing	+0.3	

=== Rockhampton South ===
1966 Queensland state election: Rockhampton South
Party	Candidate	Votes	%	±%
Liberal	Rex Pilbeam	5,873	48.8	+1.4
Labor	Kevin Charles	4,709	39.1	−3.8
Queensland Labor	Peter Boyle	1,456	12.1	+3.1
Total formal votes		12,038	98.8	+0.2
Informal votes		143	1.2	−0.2
Turnout		12,181	94.7	−1.1
Two-party-preferred result
Liberal	Rex Pilbeam	6,828	56.7	+2.0
Labor	Kevin Charles	5,210	43.3	−2.0
Liberal hold		Swing	+2.0	

=== Roma ===
1966 Queensland state election: Roma
Party	Candidate	Votes	%	±%
Country	William Ewan	5,217	63.7	+2.2
Labor	Marcus Thew	2,973	36.3	+8.1
Total formal votes		8,190	99.1	0.0
Informal votes		74	0.9	0.0
Turnout		8,264	92.9	−0.7
Country hold		Swing	−6.2	

==== By-election ====
- This by-election was caused by the death of William Ewan. It was held on 24 June 1967.

1967 Roma state by-election
Party	Candidate	Votes	%	±%
Country	Ken Tomkins	3,632	49.6	−14.1
Labor	Marcus Thew	2,148	29.4	−6.9
Independent	Ronald Alford	1,535	21.0	+21.0
Total formal votes		7,315	99.3	+0.2
Informal votes		50	0.7	−0.2
Turnout		7,365	82.8	−10.1
Two-party-preferred result
Country	Ken Tomkins	4,479	61.2	−2.5
Labor	Marcus Thew	2,836	38.8	+2.5
Country hold		Swing	−2.5	

=== Salisbury ===
1966 Queensland state election: Salisbury
Party	Candidate	Votes	%	±%
Labor	Doug Sherrington	11,484	69.3	+4.7
Liberal	Keith Brough	5,097	30.7	0.0
Total formal votes		16,581	97.9	+0.2
Informal votes		361	2.1	−0.2
Turnout		16,942	92.4	−2.1
Labor hold		Swing	+3.8	

=== Sandgate ===
1966 Queensland state election: Sandgate
Party	Candidate	Votes	%	±%
Labor	Harry Dean	7,087	62.9	+7.5
Liberal	Colin Clark	3,510	31.2	−6.0
Queensland Labor	Reginald Lincoln	666	5.9	−1.5
Total formal votes		11,263	98.2	−0.3
Informal votes		202	1.8	+0.3
Turnout		11,465	92.4	−2.3
Two-party-preferred result
Labor	Harry Dean	7,211	64.0	+7.2
Liberal	Colin Clark	4,052	36.0	−7.2
Labor hold		Swing	+7.2	

=== Sherwood ===
1966 Queensland state election: Sherwood
Party	Candidate	Votes	%	±%
Liberal	John Herbert	8,430	66.6	+5.9
Labor	Gilbert Thorsen	4,233	33.4	+0.3
Total formal votes		12,663	98.4	+0.3
Informal votes		210	1.6	−0.3
Turnout		12,873	93.4	−1.8
Liberal hold		Swing	+0.6	

=== Somerset ===
1966 Queensland state election: Somerset
Party	Candidate	Votes	%	±%
Country	Harold Richter	5,076	59.9	−0.2
Labor	Jacobus Van Der Lelie	2,742	32.4	−7.5
Independent	John Rasmussen	380	4.5	+4.5
Queensland Labor	Naomi Grulke	274	3.2	+3.2
Total formal votes		8,472	98.9	−0.4
Informal votes		97	1.1	+0.4
Turnout		8,569	94.8	−1.0
Two-party-preferred result
Country	Harold Richter	5,497	64.9	+4.8
Labor	Jacobus Van Der Lelie	2,975	35.1	−4.8
Country hold		Swing	+4.8	

=== South Brisbane ===
1966 Queensland state election: South Brisbane
Party	Candidate	Votes	%	±%
Labor	Col Bennett	5,736	58.2	+3.3
Liberal	Cecil Schuurs	3,033	30.8	−0.6
Queensland Labor	Mervyn Eunson	822	8.4	−5.3
Communist	Warren Bowden	258	2.6	+2.6
Total formal votes		9,849	96.9	+0.1
Informal votes		317	3.1	−0.1
Turnout		10,166	88.2	−3.5
Two-party-preferred result
Labor	Col Bennett	6,096	61.9	+3.5
Liberal	Cecil Schuurs	3,753	38.1	−3.5
Labor hold		Swing	+3.5	

=== South Coast ===
1966 Queensland state election: South Coast
Party	Candidate	Votes	%	±%
Liberal	Herbert Winders	4,464	37.9	+37.9
Country	Russ Hinze	3,588	30.5	−47.0
Labor	Kevin Cummings	2,462	20.9	+1.6
Independent	Bernard Elsey	844	7.2	+7.2
Queensland Labor	John McWatters	415	3.5	+0.2
Total formal votes		11,773	98.1	−0.6
Informal votes		225	1.9	+0.6
Turnout		11,998	89.3	+0.2
Two-candidate-preferred result
Country	Russ Hinze	6,175	52.5	−27.6
Liberal	Herbert Winders	5,598	47.5	+47.5
Country hold		Swing	−27.6	

=== Tablelands ===
1966 Queensland state election: Tablelands
Party	Candidate	Votes	%	±%
Labor	Edwin Wallis-Smith	3,747	55.6	+4.0
Country	Tom Gilmore	2,853	42.4	−1.0
Queensland Labor	V. Rehbein	137	2.0	+0.2
Total formal votes		6,737	97.7	+1.1
Informal votes		161	2.3	−1.1
Turnout		6,898	87.7	−1.6
Two-party-preferred result
Labor	Edwin Wallis-Smith	3,772	56.0	+2.5
Country	Tom Gilmore	2,965	44.0	−2.5
Labor hold		Swing	+2.5	

=== Toowong ===
1966 Queensland state election: Toowong
Party	Candidate	Votes	%	±%
Liberal	Charles Porter	7,254	65.3	−3.8
Labor	Douglas Wallace	2,825	25.4	+1.4
Queensland Labor	Brian O'Brien	1,033	9.3	+2.3
Total formal votes		11,112	98.4	−0.4
Informal votes		183	1.6	+0.4
Turnout		11,295	92.8	−1.3
Two-party-preferred result
Liberal	Charles Porter	8,124	73.1	−1.7
Labor	Douglas Wallace	2,988	26.9	+1.7
Liberal hold		Swing	−1.7	

=== Toowoomba East ===
1966 Queensland state election: Toowoomba East
Party	Candidate	Votes	%	±%
Labor	Peter Wood	7,814	51.9	+3.0
Country	John McCafferty	3,668	26.5	+26.5
Liberal	Lawrence Storey	2,183	15.8	−29.8
Queensland Labor	Francis Mullins	761	5.5	0.0
Independent	Gladys O'Sullivan	58	0.4	+0.4
Total formal votes		13,854	98.6	−0.5
Informal votes		200	1.4	+0.5
Turnout		14,054	94.8	0.0
Two-party-preferred result
Labor	Peter Wood	7,661	55.3	+5.4
Country	John McCafferty	6,193	44.7	+44.7
Labor gain from Liberal		Swing	+5.4	

=== Toowoomba West ===
1966 Queensland state election: Toowoomba West
Party	Candidate	Votes	%	±%
Labor	Jack Duggan	8,912	61.8	+3.5
Liberal	Clifford Leavy	4,162	28.9	−4.6
Queensland Labor	Terry Morris	1,347	9.3	+1.1
Total formal votes		14,421	98.8	+0.1
Informal votes		173	1.2	−0.1
Turnout		14,594	95.5	+0.9
Two-party-preferred result
Labor	Jack Duggan	9,163	63.5	+3.7
Liberal	Clifford Leavy	5,258	36.5	−3.7
Labor hold		Swing	+3.7	

=== Townsville North ===
1966 Queensland state election: Townsville North
Party	Candidate	Votes	%	±%
Labor	Perc Tucker	6,862	50.2	+1.8
Liberal	Robert Bonnett	4,919	36.0	+7.6
Queensland Labor	J.J. McManus	1,895	13.9	−8.7
Total formal votes		13,676	98.9	+0.2
Informal votes		154	1.1	−0.2
Turnout		13,830	91.8	−1.8
Two-party-preferred result
Labor	Perc Tucker	7,214	52.7	−0.5
Liberal	Robert Bonnett	6,464	47.3	+0.5
Labor hold		Swing	−0.5	

=== Townsville South ===
1966 Queensland state election: Townsville South
Party	Candidate	Votes	%	±%
Independent	Tom Aikens	9,260	63.2	+3.0
Labor	Arthur Trower	5,196	35.5	−4.3
Communist	Francis Bishop	194	1.3	+1.3
Total formal votes		14,650	98.7	+0.3
Informal votes		186	1.3	−0.3
Turnout		14,836	93.7	−0.3
Two-candidate-preferred result
Independent	Tom Aikens	9,361	63.9	+3.7
Labor	Arthur Trower	5,289	36.1	−3.7
Independent hold		Swing	+3.7	

=== Warrego ===
1966 Queensland state election: Warrego
Party	Candidate	Votes	%	±%
Labor	John Dufficy	unopposed		
Labor hold		Swing		

=== Warwick ===
1966 Queensland state election: Warwick
Party	Candidate	Votes	%	±%
Country	David Cory	4,816	58.9	−2.5
Labor	Eric Barrett	2,701	33.0	+9.0
Queensland Labor	Daniel Skehan	659	8.1	−6.4
Total formal votes		8,176	98.9	+0.1
Informal votes		90	1.1	−0.1
Turnout		8,266	95.9	+0.1
Two-party-preferred result
Country	David Cory	5,352	65.5	−7.8
Labor	Eric Barrett	2,824	34.5	+7.8
Country hold		Swing	−7.8	

=== Wavell ===
1966 Queensland state election: Wavell
Party	Candidate	Votes	%	±%
Liberal	Alex Dewar	7,209	50.4	−2.6
Labor	Herbert Bromley	5,895	41.2	+4.4
Queensland Labor	Thomas Grundy	1,046	7.3	−1.6
Social Credit	Mervyn Goldstiver	113	0.8	−0.6
Independent	Desmond Fulton	51	0.4	+0.4
Total formal votes		14,314	98.5	−0.1
Informal votes		222	1.5	+0.1
Turnout		14,536	94.8	−0.9
Two-party-preferred result
Liberal	Alex Dewar	8,142	56.9	−4.7
Labor	Herbert Bromley	6,172	43.1	+4.7
Liberal hold		Swing	−4.7	

=== Whitsunday ===
1966 Queensland state election: Whitsunday
Party	Candidate	Votes	%	±%
Country	Ron Camm	4,497	51.2	−5.7
Labor	Bernard Kirwan	3,801	43.3	+0.2
Queensland Labor	Bernard Lewis	485	5.5	+5.5
Total formal votes		8,783	98.3	−0.6
Informal votes		154	1.7	+0.6
Turnout		8,937	92.8	−2.0
Two-party-preferred result
Country	Ron Camm	4,892	55.7	−1.2
Labor	Bernard Kirwan	3,891	44.3	+1.2
Country hold		Swing	−1.2	

=== Windsor ===
1966 Queensland state election: Windsor
Party	Candidate	Votes	%	±%
Liberal	Ray Smith	5,049	48.3	−2.7
Labor	Keith Fordyce	4,546	43.5	+3.8
Queensland Labor	Vincent Wenck	851	8.1	−1.1
Total formal votes		10,446	98.6	0.0
Informal votes		151	1.4	0.0
Turnout		10,597	94.6	−0.7
Two-party-preferred result
Liberal	Ray Smith	5,860	56.1	−2.4
Labor	Keith Fordyce	4,546	43.9	+2.4
Liberal hold		Swing	−2.4	

=== Wynnum ===
1966 Queensland state election: Wynnum
Party	Candidate	Votes	%	±%
Labor	Ted Harris	6,986	54.7	−10.5
Liberal	Ian Beath	4,896	38.3	+7.8
Queensland Labor	Terence Burns	685	5.4	+1.0
Communist	Stella Nord	207	1.6	+1.6
Total formal votes		12,774	98.2	−0.3
Informal votes		238	1.8	+0.3
Turnout		13,012	94.1	−1.0
Two-party-preferred result
Labor	Ted Harris	7,279	57.0	−9.0
Liberal	Ian Beath	5,495	43.0	+9.0
Labor hold		Swing	−9.0	

=== Yeronga ===
1966 Queensland state election: Yeronga
Party	Candidate	Votes	%	±%
Liberal	Norm Lee	5,499	51.0	−1.2
Labor	Jack Davis	4,180	38.8	+1.9
Queensland Labor	John Lamberth	1,106	10.3	+0.2
Total formal votes		10,785	98.4	−0.1
Informal votes		177	1.6	+0.1
Turnout		10,962	94.7	−0.2
Two-party-preferred result
Liberal	Norm Lee	6,399	59.3	−0.7
Labor	Jack Davis	4,386	40.7	+0.7
Liberal hold		Swing	−0.7	

== See also ==
- 1966 Queensland state election
- Members of the Queensland Legislative Assembly, 1966-1969
