= Members of the Queensland Legislative Assembly, 1969–1972 =

This is a list of members of the 39th Legislative Assembly of Queensland from 1969 to 1972, as elected at the 1969 state election held on 17 May 1969.

Name	Party	Electorate	Term in office
Mike Ahern	Country	Landsborough	1968–1990
Jack Aiken	Labor	Warrego	1969–1974
Tom Aikens	NQLP	Townsville South	1944–1977
Gilbert Alison^{[2]}	Liberal	Maryborough	1971–1977, 1983–1989
Roy Armstrong	Country	Mulgrave	1960–1980
Col Bennett	Labor/Independent ^{[6]}	South Brisbane	1960–1972
Ted Baldwin	Labor	Logan	1969–1974
Val Bird	Country	Burdekin	1969–1983
Hon Joh Bjelke-Petersen	Country	Barambah	1947–1987
Jim Blake	Labor	Isis	1968–1974, 1977–1983
Ray Bousen	Labor	Toowoomba West	1969–1974
Fred Bromley	Labor	Norman	1960–1974
Hon Ron Camm	Country	Whitsunday	1961–1980
Hon Fred Campbell	Liberal	Aspley	1960–1980
Ed Casey	Labor/Independent ^{[6]}	Mackay	1969–1995
Hon Gordon Chalk	Liberal	Lockyer	1947–1976
Cec Carey^{[1]}	Country	Albert	1960–1969
Geoff Chinchen	Liberal	Mount Gravatt	1963–1977
David Cory	Country	Warwick	1963–1977
Dr Arthur Crawford	Liberal	Wavell	1969–1977
Horace Davies^{[2]}	Labor	Maryborough	1953–1971
Brian Davis	Labor	Brisbane	1969–1974, 1977–1989
Harry Dean	Labor	Sandgate	1960–1977
Hon Peter Delamothe	Liberal	Bowen	1960–1971
Les Diplock	DLP	Aubigny	1953–1972
Hon Alan Fletcher	Country	Cunningham	1953–1974
Pat Hanlon	Labor	Baroona	1956–1974
Martin Hanson	Labor	Port Curtis	1963–1976
Ted Harris	Labor	Wynnum	1966–1974
Bill Heatley^{[1]}^{[4]}	Liberal	Albert	1970–1971
Hon John Herbert	Liberal	Sherwood	1956–1978
Hon Nev Hewitt	Country	Mackenzie	1956–1980
Bill Hewitt	Liberal	Chatsworth	1966–1983
Russ Hinze	Country	South Coast	1966–1988
Hon Max Hodges	Country	Gympie	1957–1979
Keith Hooper	Liberal	Greenslopes	1957–1977
Jim Houghton	Country	Redcliffe	1960–1979
Jack Houston	Labor	Bulimba	1957–1980
Clive Hughes	Liberal	Kurilpa	1960–1974
Harold Hungerford	Country	Balonne	1969–1972
Alec Inch	Labor	Burke	1960–1974
Lou Jensen	Labor	Bundaberg	1969–1977
Ray Jones	Labor	Cairns	1965–1983
Vince Jones^{[5]}	Country	Callide	1950–1971
Vi Jordan	Labor	Ipswich West	1966–1974
Bill Kaus	Liberal	Hawthorne	1966–1986
Hon William Knox	Liberal	Nundah	1957–1989
Don Lane^{[3]}	Liberal	Merthyr	1971–1989
Norm Lee	Liberal	Yeronga	1964–1989
Bill Lickiss	Liberal	Mount Coot-tha	1963–1989
Eric Lloyd	Labor	Kedron	1951–1972
Bill Longeran	Country	Flinders	1957–1958, 1958–1974
David Low	Country	Cooroora	1947–1974
Evan Marginson	Labor	Ipswich East	1969–1977
Henry McKechnie	Country	Carnarvon	1963–1974
Jack Melloy	Labor	Nudgee	1960–1977
Col Miller	Liberal	Ithaca	1966–1986
Bob Moore	Liberal	Windsor	1969–1983
Peter Moore	Labor	Mourilyan	1969–1974
Selwyn Muller	Country	Fassifern	1969–1983
John Murray	Liberal	Clayfield	1963–1976
Tom Newbery	Country	Mirani	1965–1980
Fred Newton	Labor	Belmont	1960–1974
Hon David Nicholson	Country	Murrumba	1950–1972
Eugene O'Donnell	Labor	Barcoo	1961–1974
Charles Porter	Liberal	Toowong	1966–1980
Hon Wally Rae	Country	Gregory	1957–1974
Sam Ramsden^{[3]}	Liberal	Merthyr	1957–1971
Hon Harold Richter	Country	Somerset	1957–1972
Hon John Row	Country	Hinchinbrook	1960–1972
Doug Sherrington	Labor	Salisbury	1960–1974
Hon Vic Sullivan	Country	Condamine	1960–1983
Merv Thackeray	Labor/Independent ^{[6]}	Rockhampton North	1957–1972
Ken Tomkins	Country	Roma	1967–1983
Hon Douglas Tooth	Liberal	Ashgrove	1957–1974
Perc Tucker	Labor	Townsville North	1960–1974
Edwin Wallis-Smith	Labor	Tablelands	1963–1974
Claude Wharton	Country	Burnett	1960–1986
Bill Wood	Labor	Cook	1969–1974
Peter Wood	Labor	Toowoomba East	1966–1974
Keith Wright	Labor	Rockhampton South	1969–1984

^{1} On 26 December 1969, Country member for Albert, Cec Carey, died. Liberal candidate Bill Heatley won the resulting by-election on 14 February 1970.
^{2} On 4 June 1971, Labor member for Maryborough, Horace Davies, died. Liberal candidate Gilbert Alison won the resulting by-election on 24 July 1971.
^{3} On 30 June 1971, Liberal member for Merthyr, Sam Ramsden, resigned. Liberal candidate Don Lane won the resulting by-election on 24 July 1971.
^{4} On 29 October 1971, Liberal member for Albert, Bill Heatley, died. No by-election was called because of the proximity of the 1972 election.
^{5} On 30 October 1971, Country member for Callide, Vince Jones, died. No by-election was called because of the proximity of the 1972 election.
^{6} South Brisbane MP Col Bennett, Mackay MP Ed Casey and Rockhampton North MP Merv Thackeray lost Labor preselection in January 1972 for that year's election. Casey resigned from the party in February 1972 and would be re-elected as an independent, while Bennett and Thackeray were subsequently expelled from the party when they also challenged the endorsed Labor candidates as independents.

== See also ==
- 1969 Queensland state election
- Premier: Joh Bjelke-Petersen (National Party) (1968–1987)
- Members of the Queensland Legislative Assembly
