= Members of the Queensland Legislative Assembly, 1963–1966 =

This is a list of members of the 37th Legislative Assembly of Queensland from 1963 to 1966, as elected at the 1963 state election held on 1 June 1963.

Name	Party	Electorate	Term in office
Bunny Adair	Independent	Cook	1953–1969
Tom Aikens	NQLP	Townsville South	1944–1977
Mervyn Anderson	Liberal	Toowoomba East	1957–1966
Roy Armstrong	Country	Mulgrave	1960–1980
Bill Baxter	Labor/Independent	Hawthorne	1953–1966
Eddie Beardmore	Country	Balonne	1957–1969
Col Bennett	Labor	South Brisbane	1960–1972
Hon Joh Bjelke-Petersen	Country	Barambah	1947–1987
Fred Bromley	Labor	Norman	1960–1974
Peter Byrne	Labor	Mourilyan	1950–1969
Hon Ron Camm	Country	Whitsunday	1961–1980
Fred Campbell	Liberal	Aspley	1960–1980
Cec Carey	Country	Albert	1960–1969
Hon Gordon Chalk	Liberal	Lockyer	1947–1976
Geoff Chinchen	Liberal	Mount Gravatt	1963–1977
Arthur Coburn	Independent	Burdekin	1950–1969
David Cory ^{[1]}	Country	Warwick	1963–1977
Horace Davies	Labor	Maryborough	1953–1971
Harold Dean	Labor	Sandgate	1960–1977
Hon Peter Delamothe	Liberal	Bowen	1960–1971
Hon Alex Dewar	Liberal	Wavell	1950–1969
Les Diplock	DLP	Aubigny	1953–1972
Jim Donald	Labor	Ipswich East	1946–1969
John Dufficy	Labor	Warrego	1951–1969
Hon Jack Duggan	Labor	Toowoomba West	1935–1957, 1958–1969
Hon Ernie Evans ^{[4]}	Country	Mirani	1947–1965
William Ewan	Country	Roma	1950–1953, 1957–1967
Hon Alan Fletcher	Country	Cunningham	1953–1974
Eric Gaven	Country	South Coast	1950–1966
Fred Graham	Labor	Mackay	1943–1969
Bill Gunn	Labor	Wynnum	1944–1966
Pat Hanlon	Labor	Baroona	1956–1974
Martin Hanson	Labor	Port Curtis	1963–1976
Leslie Harrison ^{[5]}	Country	Logan	1957–1966
Hon John Herbert	Liberal	Sherwood	1956–1978
Neville Hewitt	Country	Mackenzie	1956–1980
Hon Thomas Hiley	Liberal	Chatsworth	1944–1966
Max Hodges	Country	Gympie	1957–1979
Keith Hooper	Liberal	Greenslopes	1957–1977
Jim Houghton	Country	Redcliffe	1960–1979
Jack Houston	Labor	Bulimba	1957–1980
Clive Hughes	Liberal	Kurilpa	1960–1974
Alec Inch	Labor	Burke	1960–1974
Ray Jones ^{[3]}	Labor	Cairns	1965–1983
Vince Jones	Country	Callide	1950–1971
Hon William Knox	Liberal	Nundah	1957–1989
Norm Lee ^{[2]}	Liberal	Yeronga	1964–1989
Bill Lickiss	Liberal	Mount Coot-tha	1963–1989
Eric Lloyd	Labor	Kedron	1951–1972
Bill Longeran	Country	Flinders	1957–1958, 1958–1974
David Low	Country	Cooroora	1947–1974
Henry McKechnie	Country	Carnarvon	1963–1974
Otto Madsen ^{[1]}	Country	Warwick	1947–1963
Hon Johnno Mann	Labor	Brisbane	1936–1969
Ivor Marsden	Labor	Ipswich West	1949–1966
Jack Melloy	Labor	Nudgee	1960–1977
Alf Muller	Independent/Country	Fassifern	1935–1969
Hon Sir Alan Munro	Liberal	Toowong	1950–1966
John Murray	Liberal	Clayfield	1963–1976
Tom Newbery ^{[4]}	Country	Mirani	1965–1980
Fred Newton	Labor	Belmont	1960–1974
Hon David Nicholson	Country	Murrumba	1950–1972
Hon Frank Nicklin	Country	Landsborough	1932–1968
Hon Dr Winston Noble ^{[2]}	Liberal	Yeronga	1950–1964
Eugene O'Donnell	Labor	Barcoo	1961–1974
Rex Pilbeam	Liberal	Rockhampton South	1960–1969
Hon Jack Pizzey	Country	Isis	1950–1968
Wally Rae	Country	Gregory	1957–1974
Sam Ramsden	Liberal	Merthyr	1957–1971
Hon Harold Richter	Country	Somerset	1957–1972
Hon John Row	Country	Hinchinbrook	1960–1972
Doug Sherrington	Labor	Salisbury	1960–1974
Ray Smith	Liberal	Windsor	1957–1969
Vic Sullivan	Country	Condamine	1960–1983
Merv Thackeray	Labor	Rockhampton North	1957–1972
Hon Douglas Tooth	Liberal	Ashgrove	1957–1974
Perc Tucker	Labor	Townsville North	1960–1974
Watty Wallace ^{[3]}	Labor	Cairns	1956–1964
Edwin Wallis-Smith	Labor	Tablelands	1963–1974
Hon Ted Walsh	Independent	Bundaberg	1935–1947, 1950–1969
Claude Wharton	Country	Burnett	1960–1986
Bob Windsor	Liberal	Ithaca	1957–1966

^{1} On 3 August 1963, the Country member for Warwick, Otto Madsen, died. Country candidate David Cory won the resulting by-election on 19 October 1963.
^{2} On 28 March 1964, the Liberal member for Yeronga and Minister for Health and Home Affairs, Winston Noble, died. Liberal candidate Norm Lee won the resulting by-election on 6 June 1964.
^{3} On 12 October 1964, the Labor member for Cairns, Watty Wallace, died. Labor candidate Ray Jones won the resulting by-election on 27 February 1965.
^{4} On 28 February 1965, the Country member for Mirani and Minister for Mines, Main Roads and Electricity, Ernie Evans, died. Country candidate Tom Newbery won the resulting by-election on 15 May 1965.
^{5} On 15 April 1966, the Country member for Logan, Leslie Harrison, died. No by-election was called due to the proximity of the 1966 state election.

== See also ==
- 1963 Queensland state election
- Nicklin Ministry (Country Party) (1957–1968)
