= Members of the Queensland Legislative Assembly, 1960–1963 =

This is a list of members of the 36th Legislative Assembly of Queensland from 1960 to 1963, as elected at the 1960 state election held on 28 May 1960.

It was conducted on redistributed boundaries based on the Electoral Districts Act 1958, so a number of seats were abolished or created at the election.

Name	Party	Electorate	Term in office
Bunny Adair	QLP/Independent^{[4]}	Cook	1953–1969
Tom Aikens	NQLP	Townsville South	1944–1977
Mervyn Anderson	Liberal	Toowoomba East	1957–1966
Roy Armstrong^{[1]}	Country	Mulgrave	1960–1980
Bill Baxter	Labor	Hawthorne	1953–1966
Eddie Beardmore	Country	Balonne	1957–1969
Col Bennett	Labor	South Brisbane	1960–1972
Joh Bjelke-Petersen	Country	Barambah	1947–1987
Fred Bromley	Labor	Norman	1960–1974
Jim Burrows	Labor	Port Curtis	1947–1963
Peter Byrne	Labor	Mourilyan	1950–1969
Ron Camm^{[3]}	Country	Whitsunday	1961–1980
Fred Campbell	Liberal	Aspley	1960–1980
Cec Carey	Country	Albert	1960–1969
Hon Gordon Chalk	Liberal	Lockyer	1947–1976
Arthur Coburn	Independent	Burdekin	1950–1969
Horace Davies	Labor	Maryborough	1953–1971
Ned Davis^{[2]}	Labor	Barcoo	1943–1961
Harry Dean	Labor	Sandgate	1960–1977
Peter Delamothe	Liberal	Bowen	1960–1971
Alex Dewar	Liberal	Wavell	1950–1969
Les Diplock	QLP/DLP^{[4]}	Aubigny	1953–1972
Jim Donald	Labor	Ipswich East	1946–1969
John Dufficy	Labor	Warrego	1951–1969
Hon Jack Duggan	Labor	Toowoomba West	1935–1957, 1958–1969
Hon Ernie Evans	Country	Mirani	1947–1965
William Ewan	Country	Roma	1950–1953, 1957–1967
Hon Alan Fletcher	Country	Cunningham	1953–1974
Eric Gaven	Country	South Coast	1950–1966
Tom Gilmore	Country	Tablelands	1957–1963
Fred Graham	Labor	Mackay	1943–1969
Bill Gunn	Labor	Wynnum	1944–1966
Pat Hanlon	Labor	Baroona	1956–1974
Leslie Harrison	Country	Logan	1957–1966
Graham Hart^{[5]}	Liberal	Mount Gravatt	1957–1963
John Herbert	Liberal	Sherwood	1956–1978
Nev Hewitt	Country	Mackenzie	1956–1980
Hon Thomas Hiley	Liberal	Chatsworth	1944–1966
Hon Paul Hilton	QLP/DLP^{[4]}	Carnarvon	1935–1963
Max Hodges	Country	Gympie	1957–1979
Keith Hooper	Liberal	Greenslopes	1957–1977
Jim Houghton	Ind./Liberal/Ind./Country ^{[6]}	Redcliffe	1960–1979
Jack Houston	Labor	Bulimba	1957–1980
Clive Hughes	Liberal	Kurilpa	1960–1974
Alec Inch	Labor	Burke	1960–1974
Vince Jones	Country	Callide	1950–1971
William Knox	Liberal	Nundah	1957–1989
Eric Lloyd	Labor	Kedron	1951–1972
Bill Longeran	Country	Flinders	1957–1958, 1958–1974
David Low	Country	Cooroora	1947–1974
Hon Otto Madsen	Country	Warwick	1947–1963
Hon Johnno Mann	Labor	Brisbane	1936–1969
Ivor Marsden	Labor	Ipswich West	1949–1966
Jack Melloy	Labor	Nudgee	1960–1977
Kenneth Morris	Liberal	Mount Coot-tha	1944–1963
Alf Muller	Country/Independent	Fassifern	1935–1969
Hon Alan Munro	Liberal	Toowong	1950–1966
Fred Newton	Labor	Belmont	1960–1974
Hon David Nicholson	Country	Murrumba	1950–1972
Hon Frank Nicklin	Country	Landsborough	1932–1968
Hon Dr Winston Noble	Liberal	Yeronga	1950–1964
Eugene O'Donnell^{[2]}	Labor	Barcoo	1961–1974
Rex Pilbeam	Liberal	Rockhampton South	1960–1969
Hon Jack Pizzey	Country	Isis	1950–1968
Wally Rae	Country	Gregory	1957–1974
Sam Ramsden	Liberal	Merthyr	1957–1971
Hon Harold Richter	Country	Somerset	1957–1972
Hon Lloyd Roberts^{[3]}	Country	Whitsunday	1950–1961
Hon John Row	Country	Hinchinbrook	1960–1972
Doug Sherrington	Labor	Salisbury	1960–1974
Ray Smith	Liberal	Windsor	1957–1969
Vic Sullivan	Country	Condamine	1960–1983
Harold Taylor	Liberal	Clayfield	1947–1963
Merv Thackeray	Labor	Rockhampton North	1957–1972
Douglas Tooth	Liberal	Ashgrove	1957–1974
Perc Tucker	Labor	Townsville North	1960–1974
Watty Wallace	Labor	Cairns	1956–1964
Hon Ted Walsh	QLP/Independent^{[4]}	Bundaberg	1935–1947, 1950–1969
Claude Wharton	Country	Burnett	1960–1986
Bob Windsor	Liberal	Ithaca	1957–1966

^{1} On 7 May 1960, three weeks before the 1960 state election, Carlisle Wordsworth, the Country member for Mulgrave, died. The election was therefore postponed in Mulgrave until 23 July 1960, when the Country Party candidate Roy Armstrong was elected.
^{2} On 10 March 1961, the Labor member for Barcoo, Ned Davis, died. Labor candidate Eugene O'Donnell won the resulting by-election on 1 July 1961.
^{3} On 11 March 1961, the Country member for Whitsunday, Lloyd Roberts, died. Country Party candidate Ron Camm won the resulting by-election on 1 July 1961.
^{4} In late 1961, the Queensland Labor Party, which had split from the Labor Party in 1957 following a dispute between then-Premier Vince Gair and the party executive, became the Queensland branch of the Democratic Labor Party (DLP) after agreements were formed on a range of issues. As a direct result, Adair and Walsh, who had never favoured an alliance with the DLP, resigned from the merged party and continued as independents until the end of their Parliamentary careers.
^{5} On 24 January 1963, the Liberal member for Mount Gravatt, Graham Hart, resigned. No by-election was called due to the proximity of the 1963 state election.
^{6} Jim Houghton, a City of Redcliffe alderman who had at one stage been a member of the Country Party, was elected in Redcliffe as an Independent. He subsequently joined the Liberal Party, but Country Party members of the Coalition refused to admit him to combined party meetings. In October 1961, he resigned from the parliamentary group but remained a lay member of the Liberal Party. In late 1962 he rejoined the Country Party.

== See also ==
- 1960 Queensland state election
- Nicklin Ministry (Country Party) (1957–1968)
