= Electoral results for the district of Hawthorne =

Queensland, Australia, district election results

This is a list of electoral results for the electoral district of Hawthorne in Queensland state elections.

== Members for Hawthorne ==
| Member | Party | Term |
|---|---|---|
| Bill Baxter | Labor | 1960–1966 |
| Bill Baxter | Independent | 1966 |
| Bill Kaus | Liberal | 1966–1972 |

== Election results ==
=== Elections in the 1960s ===
1969 Queensland state election: Hawthorne
| Party | Candidate | Votes | % | ±% |
|---|---|---|---|---|
| Labor | Ernest Adsett | 5,020 | 48.9 | +8.4 |
| Liberal | Bill Kaus | 4,408 | 42.9 | +5.6 |
| Queensland Labor | James Moss | 848 | 8.3 | +0.8 |
| Total formal votes | | 10,276 | 98.3 | −0.1 |
| Informal votes | | 178 | 1.7 | +0.1 |
| Turnout | | 10,454 | 92.4 | −1.7 |
Two-party-preferred result
| Liberal | Bill Kaus | 5,140 | 50.02 | −2.5 |
| Labor | Ernest Adsett | 5,136 | 49.98 | +2.5 |
| Liberal hold | | Swing | −2.5 | |

1966 Queensland state election: Hawthorne
| Party | Candidate | Votes | % | ±% |
|---|---|---|---|---|
| Labor | Thomas Burton | 4,263 | 40.5 | −10.9 |
| Liberal | Bill Kaus | 3,929 | 37.3 | −2.8 |
| Independent | Bill Baxter | 1,546 | 14.7 | +14.7 |
| Queensland Labor | Greg Kehoe | 789 | 7.5 | −1.0 |
| Total formal votes | | 10,527 | 98.4 | −0.2 |
| Informal votes | | 167 | 1.6 | +0.2 |
| Turnout | | 10,694 | 94.1 | −1.3 |
Two-party-preferred result
| Liberal | Bill Kaus | 5,524 | 52.5 | +5.5 |
| Labor | Thomas Burton | 5,003 | 47.5 | −5.5 |
| Liberal gain from Labor | | Swing | +5.5 | |

1963 Queensland state election: Hawthorne
| Party | Candidate | Votes | % | ±% |
|---|---|---|---|---|
| Labor | Bill Baxter | 5,389 | 51.4 | 0.0 |
| Liberal | Bill Kaus | 4,203 | 40.1 | +3.3 |
| Queensland Labor | Rogers Judge | 890 | 8.5 | −3.3 |
| Total formal votes | | 10,482 | 98.6 | −0.2 |
| Informal votes | | 150 | 1.4 | +0.2 |
| Turnout | | 10,632 | 95.4 | +1.5 |
Two-party-preferred result
| Labor | Bill Baxter | 5,555 | 53.0 | |
| Liberal | Bill Kaus | 4,927 | 47.0 | |
| Labor hold | | Swing | N/A | |

1960 Queensland state election: Hawthorne
| Party | Candidate | Votes | % | ±% |
|---|---|---|---|---|
| Labor | Bill Baxter | 5,428 | 51.4 | |
| Liberal | Clive Harburg | 3,882 | 36.8 | |
| Queensland Labor | Greg Kehoe | 1,245 | 11.8 | |
| Total formal votes | | 10,555 | 98.8 | |
| Informal votes | | 123 | 1.2 | |
| Turnout | | 10,678 | 93.9 | |
| Labor win | | (new seat) | | |
