= Electoral results for the district of South Brisbane =

Queensland, Australia, district election results

This is a list of electoral results for the electoral district of South Brisbane in Queensland state elections.

== Members for South Brisbane ==
First incarnation (1860–1878, 1 member)
Member	Party	Term
Henry Richards	Unaligned	1860–1863
Thomas Stephens	Unaligned	1863–1875
Richard Kingsford	Unaligned	1875–1878
Second incarnation (1878–1912, 2 members)
Member	Party	Term
Richard Kingsford	Unaligned	1878–1883
Angus Mackay	Unaligned	1878–1880
Simon Fraser	Unaligned	1880–1888
Henry Jordan	Unaligned	1883–1888
Henry Jordan	Unaligned	1888–1890
Abraham Luya	Unaligned	1888–1893
Arthur Morry	Unaligned	1890–1893
Harry Turley	Labor	1893–1899
Charles Midson	Ministerialist	1893–1896
Charles Midson	Ministerialist/Opposition	1896–1904
Abraham Luya	Unaligned	1899
Harry Turley	Labor	1899–1902
Alec Lamont	Ministerialist	1902–1904
William Reinhold	Labor	1904–1907
Thomas Bouchard	Ministerialist/Opposition	1904–1908
Peter Airey	Ministerialist/Independent Opposition	1908–1909
John Huxham	Opposition/Ministerialist	1908–1909
Thomas Bouchard	Ministerialist/Opposition	1909–1912
James Allan	Unaligned	1909–1912
Third incarnation (1912–present, 1 member)
Member	Party	Term
Thomas Bouchard	Ministerialist/Opposition	1912–1915
Edgar Free	Labor	1915–1920
Myles Ferricks	Labor	1920–1929
Neil MacGroarty	Country and Progressive National	1929–1932
Vince Gair	Labor	1932–1957
Vince Gair	Queensland Labor	1957–1960
Col Bennett	Labor	1960–1972
Fred Bromley	Labor	1972–1974
Colin Lamont	Liberal	1974–1977
Jim Fouras	Labor	1977–1986
Anne Warner	Labor	1986–1995
Anna Bligh	Labor	1995–2012
Jackie Trad	Labor	2012–2020
Amy MacMahon	Greens	2020–2024
Barbara O'Shea	Labor	2024–present

== Election results ==
=== Elections in the 2020s ===
2024 Queensland state election: South Brisbane
Party	Candidate	Votes	%	±%
Greens	Amy MacMahon	12,146	34.71	−3.19
Labor	Barbara O'Shea	11,192	31.99	−2.41
Liberal National	Marita Parkinson	10,472	29.93	+7.13
One Nation	Richard Henderson	1,179	3.37	+1.57
Total formal votes		34,989	97.56	+0.14
Informal votes		874	2.44	−0.14
Turnout		35,863	86.04	−1.94
Two-candidate-preferred result
Labor	Barbara O'Shea	19,613	56.05	+11.40
Greens	Amy MacMahon	15,376	43.95	−11.40
Labor gain from Greens		Swing	+11.40	

2020 Queensland state election: South Brisbane
Party	Candidate	Votes	%	±%
Greens	Amy MacMahon	12,631	37.89	+3.54
Labor	Jackie Trad	11,471	34.41	−1.59
Liberal National	Clem Grehan	7,616	22.85	−1.49
One Nation	Rosalie Taxis	573	1.72	+1.72
Independent	John Meyer	441	1.32	+1.32
Independent	John Jiggens	398	1.19	+1.19
United Australia	Marcus Thorne	206	0.62	+0.62
Total formal votes		33,336	97.42	+1.07
Informal votes		882	2.58	−1.07
Turnout		34,218	87.98	+4.26
Notional two-party-preferred count (Note: Estimate two-party preferred count by Antony Green.)
Labor	Jackie Trad		68.60	
Liberal National	Clem Grehan		31.40	
Two-candidate-preferred result
Greens	Amy MacMahon	18,450	55.35	+8.90
Labor	Jackie Trad	14,886	44.65	−8.90
Greens gain from Labor		Swing	+8.90	

=== Elections in the 2010s ===
2017 Queensland state election: South Brisbane
Party	Candidate	Votes	%	±%
Labor	Jackie Trad	10,007	36.0	−6.0
Greens	Amy MacMahon	9,549	34.4	+11.7
Liberal National	Simon Quinn	6,764	24.3	−8.0
Sustainable Australia	Cameron Murray	516	1.9	+1.9
People Decide	Karel Boele	484	1.7	−1.2
Ind. Animal Justice	Karagh-Mae Kelly	249	0.9	+0.9
Independent	Frank Jordan	230	0.8	+0.8
Total formal votes		27,799	96.4	−2.0
Informal votes		1,052	3.6	+2.0
Turnout		28,851	83.7	+3.1
Two-candidate-preferred result
Labor	Jackie Trad	14,887	53.6	−10.2
Greens	Amy MacMahon	12,912	46.5	+46.5
Labor hold		Swing	−10.2	

2015 Queensland state election: South Brisbane
Party	Candidate	Votes	%	±%
Labor	Jackie Trad	12,355	42.71	+4.15
Liberal National	Fiona Ward	9,321	32.22	−5.85
Greens	Jonathan Sri	6,320	21.85	+3.78
Independent	Karel Boele	930	3.22	+1.32
Total formal votes		28,926	98.35	+0.42
Informal votes		484	1.65	−0.42
Turnout		29,410	86.75	−0.36
Two-party-preferred result
Labor	Jackie Trad	17,697	63.79	+9.13
Liberal National	Fiona Ward	10,045	36.21	−9.13
Labor hold		Swing	+9.13	

2012 South Brisbane state by-election, 28 April 2012
Party	Candidate	Votes	%	±%
Liberal National	Clem Grehan	7,761	38.0	–0.1
Labor	Jackie Trad	6,720	32.9	–5.7
Greens	Jo-Anne Bragg	3,960	19.4	+1.3
DS4SEQ	Penny Panorea	751	3.7	+3.7
Katter's Australian	Robert Wardrop	435	2.1	–1.3
Independent	Jason McKenzie	349	1.7	+1.7
Family First	Penny McCreery	261	1.3	+1.3
Independent Socialist Alliance	Liam Flenady	189	0.9	–1.0
Total formal votes		20,426	98.2	+0.2
Informal votes		383	1.8	–0.2
Turnout		20,809	67.5	–19.6
Two-party-preferred result
Labor	Jackie Trad	8,963	51.7	–3.0
Liberal National	Clem Grehan	8,388	48.3	+3.0
Labor hold		Swing	–3.0	

2012 Queensland state election: South Brisbane
Party	Candidate	Votes	%	±%
Labor	Anna Bligh	10,015	38.57	−9.85
Liberal National	Clem Grehan	9,887	38.07	+10.16
Greens	Jo-Anne Bragg	4,692	18.07	+0.66
Katter's Australian	Robert Wardrop	883	3.40	+3.40
Independent Socialist Alliance	Liam Flenady	491	1.89	+1.89
Total formal votes		25,968	97.94	−0.25
Informal votes		547	2.06	+0.25
Turnout		26,515	87.11	+0.67
Two-party-preferred result
Labor	Anna Bligh	12,977	54.66	−10.35
Liberal National	Clem Grehan	10,763	45.34	+10.35
Labor hold		Swing	−10.35	

=== Elections in the 2000s ===
2009 Queensland state election: South Brisbane
Party	Candidate	Votes	%	±%
Labor	Anna Bligh	12,243	48.4	−3.2
Liberal National	Mary Carroll	7,058	27.9	+2.6
Greens	Gary Kane	4,402	17.4	−4.0
Independent	Merilyn Haines	409	1.6	+1.6
Independent	Sam Watson	344	1.4	+1.4
Independent	Greg Martin	330	1.3	+1.3
DS4SEQ	David Rendell	304	1.2	+1.2
Independent	Derek Rosborough	148	0.6	−1.0
Independent	Matt Coates	46	0.2	+0.2
Total formal votes		25,284	98.0	
Informal votes		467	2.0	
Turnout		25,751	86.4	
Two-party-preferred result
Labor	Anna Bligh	14,697	65.0	−3.4
Liberal National	Mary Carroll	7,911	35.0	+3.4
Labor hold		Swing	−3.4	

2006 Queensland state election: South Brisbane
Party	Candidate	Votes	%	±%
Labor	Anna Bligh	12,636	51.5	−1.6
Liberal	Lynne Jennings	6,212	25.3	+1.2
Greens	Gary Kane	5,269	21.5	+1.5
Independent	Derek Rosborough	405	1.7	+1.7
Total formal votes		24,522	98.2	+0.4
Informal votes		455	1.8	−0.4
Turnout		24,977	85.3	−0.4
Two-party-preferred result
Labor	Anna Bligh	15,296	68.4	−2.7
Liberal	Lynne Jennings	7,071	31.6	+2.7
Labor hold		Swing	−2.7	

2004 Queensland state election: South Brisbane
Party	Candidate	Votes	%	±%
Labor	Anna Bligh	12,848	53.1	−6.8
Liberal	Alister Cowper	5,839	24.1	+4.4
Greens	Juanita Wheeler	4,847	20.0	+11.0
Independent	Lynda Hansen	680	2.8	+2.8
Total formal votes		24,214	97.8	+0.4
Informal votes		552	2.2	−0.4
Turnout		24,766	85.7	−2.9
Two-party-preferred result
Labor	Anna Bligh	16,150	71.1	−3.8
Liberal	Alister Cowper	6,577	28.9	+3.8
Labor hold		Swing	−3.8	

2001 Queensland state election: South Brisbane
Party	Candidate	Votes	%	±%
Labor	Anna Bligh	14,329	59.9	+6.7
Liberal	Jason Chappel	4,720	19.7	−7.1
Greens	Mark Taylor	2,150	9.0	+8.3
Democrats	Crystal Lagos	985	4.1	−0.5
Independent	Murray Swan	777	3.2	+1.5
Independent	Guy Freemarijuana	653	2.7	+0.3
Independent	Adam Baker	310	1.3	+1.3
Total formal votes		23,924	97.4	
Informal votes		638	2.6	
Turnout		24,562	88.6	
Two-party-preferred result
Labor	Anna Bligh	16,377	74.9	+9.2
Liberal	Jason Chappel	5,479	25.1	−9.2
Labor hold		Swing	+9.2	

=== Elections in the 1990s ===
1998 Queensland state election: South Brisbane
Party	Candidate	Votes	%	±%
Labor	Anna Bligh	10,591	53.4	+2.2
Liberal	Leo Tsimpikas	5,209	26.3	−7.7
One Nation	Raymond Meiers	1,592	8.0	+8.0
Democrats	Anthony Lee	1,013	5.1	−3.7
Independent	Guy Freemarijuana	527	2.7	+2.7
Independent	Murray Swan	375	1.9	+1.9
Independent	Coral Wynter	278	1.4	+1.4
Australia First	Mario Zocchi	185	0.9	+0.9
Reform	Chris Ray	66	0.3	+0.3
Total formal votes		19,836	98.3	+1.3
Informal votes		351	1.7	−1.3
Turnout		20,187	90.0	+3.5
Two-party-preferred result
Labor	Anna Bligh	12,390	66.3	+5.6
Liberal	Leo Tsimpikas	6,300	33.7	−5.6
Labor hold		Swing	+5.6	

1995 Queensland state election: South Brisbane
Party	Candidate	Votes	%	±%
Labor	Anna Bligh	9,409	51.2	−10.0
Liberal	Marcus Clark	6,243	33.9	+6.4
Democrats	Althea Smith	1,624	8.8	+3.9
Independent	Tony Kneipp	742	4.0	+4.0
Independent	Geoff Wilson	375	2.0	+2.0
Total formal votes		18,393	96.9	+0.4
Informal votes		579	3.1	−0.4
Turnout		18,972	86.5	
Two-party-preferred result
Labor	Anna Bligh	10,803	60.7	−7.8
Liberal	Marcus Clark	6,996	39.3	+7.8
Labor hold		Swing	−7.8	

1992 Queensland state election: South Brisbane
Party	Candidate	Votes	%	±%
Labor	Anne Warner	11,970	61.2	+3.3
Liberal	Mark Bromback	5,389	27.5	+7.0
Indigenous Peoples	Netta Tyson	1,247	6.4	+6.4
Democrats	Andrew Bartlett	963	4.9	+4.9
Total formal votes		19,569	96.6	
Informal votes		691	3.4	
Turnout		20,260	86.6	
Two-party-preferred result
Labor	Anne Warner	13,020	68.5	+3.0
Liberal	Mark Bromback	5,989	31.5	−3.0
Labor hold		Swing	+3.0	

=== Elections in the 1980s ===
1989 Queensland state election: South Brisbane
Party	Candidate	Votes	%	±%
Labor	Anne Warner	10,037	57.9	+9.8
Liberal	Heather Scantlebury	3,547	20.5	−0.5
National	Peter Peters	2,094	12.1	−15.7
Greens	Peter Hutton	1,656	9.6	+9.6
Total formal votes		17,334	96.4	−0.2
Informal votes		639	3.6	+0.2
Turnout		17,973	85.7	−2.6
Two-party-preferred result
Labor	Anne Warner	10,947	64.0	+9.8
Liberal	Heather Scantlebury	6,157	36.0	−9.8
Labor hold		Swing	+9.8	

1986 Queensland state election: South Brisbane
Party	Candidate	Votes	%	±%
Labor	Anne Warner	8,222	48.1	−6.9
National	Leo Tsimpikas	4,754	27.8	−2.0
Liberal	Guri Lluka	3,595	21.0	+6.9
Socialist Workers	Susanne Bolton	533	3.1	+3.1
Total formal votes		17,104	96.6	
Informal votes		604	3.4	
Turnout		17,708	88.3	
Two-party-preferred result
Labor	Anne Warner	9,273	54.2	−2.6
National	Leo Tsimpikas	7,831	45.8	+2.6
Labor hold		Swing	−2.6	

1983 Queensland state election: South Brisbane
Party	Candidate	Votes	%	±%
Labor	Jim Fouras	7,476	55.0	+2.7
National	Malcolm Ellis	4,052	29.8	+29.8
Liberal	Rodney Miller	1,914	14.1	−30.2
Socialist	Ivan Ivanoff	155	1.1	+1.1
Total formal votes		13,597	97.3	−0.2
Informal votes		382	2.7	+0.2
Turnout		13,979	87.8	+3.7
Two-party-preferred result
Labor	Jim Fouras	7,982	58.7	+4.7
National	Malcolm Ellis	5,615	41.3	+41.3
Labor hold		Swing	+4.7	

1980 Queensland state election: South Brisbane
Party	Candidate	Votes	%	±%
Labor	Jim Fouras	7,006	52.3	+0.4
Liberal	Colin Lamont	5,935	44.3	+0.7
Independent	Edward Grevsmuhl	444	3.3	+3.3
Total formal votes		13,385	97.5	+0.4
Informal votes		336	2.5	−0.4
Turnout		13,721	84.1	−4.0
Two-party-preferred result
Labor	Jim Fouras	7,228	54.0	+0.8
Liberal	Colin Lamont	6,157	46.0	−0.8
Labor hold		Swing	+0.8	

=== Elections in the 1970s ===
1977 Queensland state election: South Brisbane
Party	Candidate	Votes	%	±%
Labor	Jim Fouras	7,510	51.9	+6.0
Liberal	David Smith	6,312	43.6	−10.5
Progress	William Everaarps	649	4.5	+4.5
Total formal votes		14,471	97.1	
Informal votes		429	2.9	
Turnout		14,900	88.1	
Two-party-preferred result
Labor	Jim Fouras	7,705	53.2	+7.3
Liberal	David Smith	6,766	46.8	−7.3
Labor gain from Liberal		Swing	+7.3	

1974 Queensland state election: South Brisbane
Party	Candidate	Votes	%	±%
Liberal	Colin Lamont	6,414	55.0	+29.6
Labor	Fred Bromley	5,250	45.0	−4.4
Total formal votes		11,664	97.9	+1.1
Informal votes		249	2.1	−1.1
Turnout		11,913	83.9	−7.7
Liberal gain from Labor		Swing	+16.0	

1972 Queensland state election: South Brisbane
Party	Candidate	Votes	%	±%
Labor	Fred Bromley	5,609	49.4	−9.8
Liberal	Joseph Fenton	2,885	25.4	−4.5
Independent	Col Bennett	2,227	19.6	+19.6
Queensland Labor	Viliam Simek	591	5.2	−3.4
Independent	Anton Terpstra	47	0.4	+0.4
Total formal votes		11,359	96.8	
Informal votes		375	3.2	
Turnout		11,734	91.6	
Two-party-preferred result
Labor	Fred Bromley	6,933	61.0	+4.3
Liberal	Joseph Fenton	4,426	39.0	−4.3
Labor hold		Swing	+4.3	

=== Elections in the 1960s ===
1969 Queensland state election: South Brisbane
Party	Candidate	Votes	%	±%
Labor	Col Bennett	5,193	59.2	+1.0
Liberal	Alan Brown	2,621	29.9	−0.9
Queensland Labor	John O'Connell	757	8.6	+0.2
Socialist	Victor Slater	199	2.3	+2.3
Total formal votes		8,770	97.0	+0.1
Informal votes		273	3.0	−0.1
Turnout		9,043	84.4	−3.8
Two-party-preferred result
Labor	Col Bennett	5,493	62.3	+0.4
Liberal	Alan Brown	3,277	37.7	−0.4
Labor hold		Swing	+0.4	

1966 Queensland state election: South Brisbane
Party	Candidate	Votes	%	±%
Labor	Col Bennett	5,736	58.2	+3.3
Liberal	Cecil Schuurs	3,033	30.8	−0.6
Queensland Labor	Mervyn Eunson	822	8.4	−5.3
Communist	Warren Bowden	258	2.6	+2.6
Total formal votes		9,849	96.9	+0.1
Informal votes		317	3.1	−0.1
Turnout		10,166	88.2	−3.5
Two-party-preferred result
Labor	Col Bennett	6,096	61.9	+3.5
Liberal	Cecil Schuurs	3,753	38.1	−3.5
Labor hold		Swing	+3.5	

1963 Queensland state election: South Brisbane
Party	Candidate	Votes	%	±%
Labor	Col Bennett	5,768	54.9	+11.0
Liberal	Gabrielle Horan	3,298	31.4	+4.2
Queensland Labor	Greg Kehoe	1,444	13.7	−15.2
Total formal votes		10,510	96.8	−1.4
Informal votes		344	3.2	+1.4
Turnout		10,854	91.7	+3.7
Two-party-preferred result
Labor	Col Bennett	6,037	57.4	
Liberal	Gabrielle Horan	4,473	42.6	
Labor hold		Swing	N/A	

1960 Queensland state election: South Brisbane
Party	Candidate	Votes	%	±%
Labor	Col Bennett	5,011	43.9	
Queensland Labor	Vince Gair	3,294	28.9	
Liberal	Charles O'Brien	3,106	27.2	
Total formal votes		11,411	98.2	
Informal votes		209	1.8	
Turnout		11,620	88.0	
Labor gain from Queensland Labor		Swing		

=== Elections in the 1950s ===
1957 Queensland state election: South Brisbane
Party	Candidate	Votes	%	±%
Queensland Labor	Vince Gair	3,598	44.1	+44.1
Liberal	William Henry	2,593	31.8	+31.8
Labor	Tom Doyle	1,974	24.2	−34.4
Total formal votes		8,165	98.7	+0.2
Informal votes		104	1.3	−0.2
Turnout		8,269	93.7	+1.8
Queensland Labor gain from Labor		Swing	N/A	

1956 Queensland state election: South Brisbane
Party	Candidate	Votes	%	±%
Labor	Vince Gair	4,736	58.6	−6.0
Independent	Frank Roberts	2,731	33.8	+33.8
Independent	Jack Noonan	611	7.6	+7.6
Total formal votes		8,078	98.5	0.0
Informal votes		123	1.5	0.0
Turnout		8,201	91.9	+1.5
Labor hold		Swing	N/A	

1953 Queensland state election: South Brisbane
Party	Candidate	Votes	%	±%
Labor	Vince Gair	5,847	64.6	+8.1
Liberal	Geoffrey Wadeson	2,787	30.8	−12.7
Independent	John Parker	418	4.6	+4.6
Total formal votes		9,052	98.5	−0.4
Informal votes		134	1.5	+0.4
Turnout		9,186	90.4	−1.5
Labor hold		Swing	+11.2	

1950 Queensland state election: South Brisbane
Party	Candidate	Votes	%	±%
Labor	Vince Gair	5,651	56.5	
Liberal	Allan McLeod	4,347	43.5	
Total formal votes		9,998	98.9	
Informal votes		115	1.1	
Turnout		10,113	91.9	
Labor hold		Swing		

=== Elections in the 1940s ===
1947 Queensland state election: South Brisbane
Party	Candidate	Votes	%	±%
Labor	Vince Gair	6,072	53.1	−3.2
People's Party	Winston Noble	5,369	46.9	+3.2
Total formal votes		11,441	98.0	+0.4
Informal votes		234	2.0	−0.4
Turnout		11,675	91.8	+9.0
Labor hold		Swing	−3.2	

1944 Queensland state election: South Brisbane
Party	Candidate	Votes	%	±%
Labor	Vince Gair	5,940	56.3	−0.4
People's Party	Robert Lincoln	4,611	43.7	+0.4
Total formal votes		10,551	97.6	+0.1
Informal votes		263	2.4	−0.1
Turnout		10,814	82.8	−5.4
Labor hold		Swing	−0.4	

1941 Queensland state election: South Brisbane
Party	Candidate	Votes	%	±%
Labor	Vince Gair	5,740	56.7	+6.9
United Australia	Daniel Rowley	4,393	43.3	+12.7
Total formal votes		10,133	97.5	−1.6
Informal votes		256	2.5	+1.6
Turnout		10,389	88.2	−4.9
Labor hold		Swing	+1.3	

=== Elections in the 1930s ===
1938 Queensland state election: South Brisbane
Party	Candidate	Votes	%	±%
Labor	Vince Gair	5,105	49.8	−17.8
United Australia	William Kingwell	3,135	30.6	−1.8
Protestant Labour	James McCann	2,016	19.7	+19.7
Total formal votes		10,256	99.1	+2.0
Informal votes		97	0.9	−2.0
Turnout		10,353	93.1	+0.3
Two-party-preferred result
Labor	Vince Gair	5,295	55.4	−12.2
United Australia	William Kingwell	4,260	44.6	+12.2
Labor hold		Swing	−12.2	

1935 Queensland state election: South Brisbane
Party	Candidate	Votes	%	±%
Labor	Vince Gair	6,405	67.6	
CPNP	Robert Paine	3,065	32.4	
Total formal votes		9,470	97.1	
Informal votes		287	2.9	
Turnout		9,757	92.8	
Labor hold		Swing		

1932 Queensland state election: South Brisbane
Party	Candidate	Votes	%	±%
Labor	Vince Gair	4,737	52.2	
CPNP	Neil MacGroarty	3,972	43.8	
Queensland Party	Joseph Clancy	364	4.0	
Total formal votes		9,073	98.0	
Informal votes		182	2.0	
Turnout		9,255	94.7	
Labor gain from CPNP		Swing		

=== Elections in the 1920s ===
1929 Queensland state election: South Brisbane
Party	Candidate	Votes	%	±%
CPNP	Neil MacGroarty	3,183	55.0	+5.8
Labor	Myles Ferricks	2,606	45.0	−5.8
Total formal votes		5,789	98.2	−0.9
Informal votes		105	1.8	+0.9
Turnout		5,894	86.9	−0.5
CPNP gain from Labor		Swing	+5.8	

1926 Queensland state election: South Brisbane
Party	Candidate	Votes	%	±%
Labor	Myles Ferricks	3,006	50.8	−2.3
CPNP	Alec McGill	2,907	49.2	+7.9
Total formal votes		5,888	99.1	+1.5
Informal votes		79	0.9	−1.5
Turnout		5,967	87.4	+2.9
Labor hold		Swing	N/A	

1923 Queensland state election: South Brisbane
Party	Candidate	Votes	%	±%
Labor	Myles Ferricks	3,155	53.1	+1.5
United	John Kessell	2,450	41.3	−7.1
Independent	Charles Gabbert	333	5.6	+5.6
Total formal votes		5,938	97.6	−0.7
Informal votes		146	2.4	+0.7
Turnout		6,084	84.5	+5.5
Labor hold		Swing	N/A	

1920 Queensland state election: South Brisbane
Party	Candidate	Votes	%	±%
Labor	Myles Ferricks	3,063	51.6	−3.4
National	James Davey	2,877	48.4	+3.4
Total formal votes		5,940	98.3	−0.1
Informal votes		102	1.7	+0.1
Turnout		6,042	79.0	−1.6
Labor hold		Swing	−3.4	

=== Elections in the 1910s ===
1918 Queensland state election: South Brisbane
Party	Candidate	Votes	%	±%
Labor	Edgar Free	2,986	55.0	−4.4
National	Albert Harte	2,440	45.0	+4.4
Total formal votes		5,426	98.4	+0.4
Informal votes		87	1.6	−0.4
Turnout		5,513	80.6	−6.0
Labor hold		Swing	−4.4	

1915 Queensland state election: South Brisbane
Party	Candidate	Votes	%	±%
Labor	Edgar Free	2,693	59.4	+9.8
Liberal	John Burke	1,842	40.6	−9.8
Total formal votes		4,535	98.0	−1.3
Informal votes		93	2.0	+1.3
Turnout		4,628	86.6	+9.1
Labor gain from Liberal		Swing	+9.8	

1912 Queensland state election: South Brisbane
Party	Candidate	Votes	%	±%
Liberal	Thomas Bouchard	1,914	50.4	
Labor	Joseph Sherry	1,882	49.6	
Total formal votes		3,796	99.3	
Informal votes		26	0.7	
Turnout		3,822	77.5	
Liberal hold		Swing		
