= Colin Lamont (politician) =

Australian politician

Member of the Queensland Legislative Assembly for South Brisbane
- In office 7 December 1974 – 12 November 1977
- Preceded by: Fred Bromley
- Succeeded by: Jim Fouras

Personal details
- Born: Colin Charles Bird; 18 November 1941 Brisbane, Queensland, Australia
- Died: 7 July 2012 (aged 70) Queensland, Australia
- Party: Liberal Party
- Spouse: Janette Alexander (m.1974)
- Education: University of Queensland
- Occupation: Teacher, Police officer

Colin Charles Lamont (18 November 1941 – 7 July 2012) was an Australian politician. He was a Liberal Party member of the Legislative Assembly of Queensland from 1974 until 1977, representing the electorate of South Brisbane.

== Early life ==
Lamont was born Colin Bird in Brisbane, and changed his name officially in 1965. He was educated at Wilston State School, Brisbane Grammar School and Brisbane Teachers' College, and subsequently studied political science, history and government at the University of Queensland. While at university, he was the arts representative on the student representative council, editor of Semper Floreat, and was the Queensland education officer of the National Union of Australian University Students in 1963. In 1964, Lamont served as national director of Abschol, a committee of the union supporting scholarships for indigenous students.

Lamont worked as a state secondary school teacher after graduating from university, undertook further study in London, before serving a stint as a Detective-Inspector with the Royal Hong Kong Police from 1966 to 1971. He was injured at one stage during his Hong Kong service when a homemade bomb exploded while he was attempting to defuse it. He was seconded to MI6's special intelligence branch upon for a period upon his recovery. Lamont subsequently returned to Australia, where he served as senior history master at Brisbane Grammar School until his election to parliament. He was also active in debating circles, serving as President of the Queensland Debating Union in 1973 and as president of the Queensland Liberal Speakers' Group from 1973 to 1975.

== In parliament ==
In 1974, Lamont was preselected as the Liberal candidate for the usually safe Labor seat of South Brisbane, in what was seen at the time as a test run for a future bid for the federal seat of Brisbane. Lamont reportedly told a senior cabinet minister on the day before the election that he thought he might win, only to be told "Don’t get carried away, Col, you need 11 per cent and the state swing is going to be about seven per cent." He won the seat with a 17% swing, as Labor suffered one of the worst defeats in its history, taking a seat that, since 1912, had only fallen to the conservatives for one term following the 1957 Labor split, and for one term during the Great Depression.

In parliament, Lamont was a fierce advocate for government transparency and accountability. During the 1975 constitutional crisis, he opposed premier Joh Bjelke-Petersen breaking convention by having Labor renegade Albert Field appointed to the Senate, and also opposed Bjelke-Petersen's appointment as Police Commissioner of Terry Lewis, who would later be jailed for corruption. When Lewis' reforming predecessor Ray Whitrod resigned as Commissioner in 1976, in protest at Bjelke-Petersen's promotion of Lewis to Assistant Commissioner, Lamont went on television to call for Whitrod to withdraw his resignation.

Lamont staunchly opposed Bjelke-Petersen's 1977 ban on street marches. On 7 September that year, he addressed people attending a protest rally at the University of Queensland to dissuade them from forcing a confrontation, and then condemned the ban in parliament, citing his encounter with the students. Lamont said that, in response to his attack on the ban, Bjelke-Petersen lunged at him on the floor of parliament, saying "you are a traitor to this government!" Lamont once stated that, after the 1977 election, he had been offered a promotion to the ministry by Russ Hinze if he promised to stop commenting on police corruption and civil liberties issues, and that he had replied, "If that's the price, I don't want it." Lamont discovered during 1977 that the police Special Branch had been conducting surveillance of him and other Liberal dissidents, and was reporting directly to Bjelke-Petersen.

In a redistribution before the 1977 election, Bjelke-Petersen intentionally made Lamont's seat unwinnable. He attempted to switch to the seat of Woodridge, but was defeated in the general election by Bill D'Arcy. Lamont's successor in South Brisbane, Jim Fouras, recounted being told by National Party MPs at the time of his election that they had changed South Brisbane's boundaries because they would rather have a Labor member than another term of Colin Lamont.

== Post-parliament ==
Lamont served as head of the Brisbane Deaf School and as the state chair of the Council on Disability after his election defeat. He also remained involved in political life after his election defeat, and ran unsuccessfully for his old seat of South Brisbane at the 1980 election. He was a close friend of late Liberal Senator Neville Bonner, and strongly criticised his 1983 preselection loss to David MacGibbon. He later served as president of the Registered & Licensed Clubs Association of Queensland, lectured in politics and public policy at Griffith University and served as the Queensland chairman of the Australian Council for Education Standards. In retirement in 2006, he founded the Unit Owners and Body Corporate Alliance, a Gold Coast lobby group for unit owners.

Lamont died on 7 July 2012.

Parliament of Queensland
Preceded by Fred Bromley	Member for South Brisbane; 1974–1977	Succeeded by Jim Fouras
