= Douglas Credit Party =

Australian political party

The Douglas Credit Party was an Australian political party based on the Social Credit theory of monetary reform, first set out by Clifford Douglas. It gained its strongest result in Queensland in 1935, when it gained 7.02% of first preferences under the leadership of the psychiatrist Dr Julius Streeter. Streeter had returned to Australia in 1919 as a war hero after being a surgeon in the Battle of Ypres where he was injured by mustard gas.

The Australian followers of Social Credit were ambivalent about direct political action. Some felt the existing form of democracy, with its emphasis on parties of the "left and right", to be inimical to genuine representation of the people. A number of Social Crediters felt that parliamentarians should have a first loyalty to their constituents and not a greater loyalty to a particular party organisation. However, some followers entered directly into the political party fray, and others sought to influence the policies of existing political parties, especially the Australian Labor Party (ALP). However, not all supporters of the movement were involved with Labor. Charles North, the state president of the Western Australia branch of the movement during the 1930s, was a Nationalist Party member of the Western Australian Legislative Assembly.

At the height of the economic depression in the 1930s, advocates of Social Credit theory were successful in gaining majority conference support within the ALP for financial reform along the lines of that proposed by Social Credit theory. However, the policy was never put into practice by subsequent Labor governments. The party's strongest federal result was at the 1934 election, at which it gained 4.69% of the national lower house vote. The party did not win seats in either election. After Streeter's death in 1946, the party went into a terminal decline.

During the 1960s, there were several attempts in Queensland, South Australia and New South Wales to revive the political fortunes of Social Credit. In South Australia, the "Liberty League" contested a few seats in federal elections but failed to gain many votes. At the 1961 federal election, three candidates – William Ward, Albert Lee and Kenneth Whiteman – unsuccessfully stood for the Senate in New South Wales. They polled about 15,000 primary votes across the State. Some support was gained in a few New South Wales federal electorates, notably the Labor-held seat of East Sydney and a few strong Labor seats in the Hunter Valley.

Also at the 1961 federal election, several candidates contested the poll under the banner of the Australian National Party. The party was short-lived and some of its members joined the ranks of a revived Social Credit Movement of Australia (Queensland), which contested nine seats at the 1963 Queensland state election and three seats at the 1969 Queensland state election with only meagre results. Its strongest support was in the Maryborough area of central Queensland.

A single Social Credit candidate stood in the 1969 federal election in the Sydney seat of Banks, but gained little support. At the 1974 federal election, another attempt was made in NSW to win a seat in the Senate, but again the votes gained were minimal.

For some decades until the late 1960s, the late Mrs J Elvin operated, on a voluntary basis, a Social Credit bookroom in George Street, Sydney. A small monthly newsletter was also produced and circulated via this centre.

The ongoing influence of Social Credit ideas was also revealed in the heyday of the One Nation Party in the late 1990s, with that party's promotion of a National Credit Authority. A Social Credit Secretariat in Queensland continues to promote Social Credit via the internet.
