= Bill Baxter (Queensland politician) =

Australian politician (1907–1978)

Member of the Queensland Legislative Assembly for Norman
- In office 7 March 1953 – 28 May 1960
- Preceded by: Louis Luckins
- Succeeded by: Fred Bromley

Member of the Queensland Legislative Assembly for Hawthorne
- In office 28 May 1960 – 28 May 1966
- Preceded by: New seat
- Succeeded by: Bill Kaus

Personal details
- Born: William Edward Baxter; 29 May 1907 Chinchilla, Queensland
- Died: 5 July 1978 (aged 71) Brisbane, Queensland
- Resting place: Balmoral Cemetery
- Party: Labor
- Spouse: May Reardon
- Occupation: Clerk, Labourer, Cleaner, Fireman

William Edward Baxter (1907–1978) was a politician in Queensland, Australia. He was a Member of the Queensland Legislative Assembly.

== Early life ==
William Edward Baxter was born on 29 May 1907 in Chinchilla, Queensland, the son of Catherine Baxter. He attended Chinchilla State School. He married May Reardon on 29 Sep 1929; the couple had 2 daughters. He worked for Queensland Railways as a cleaner and clerk.

== Politics ==
At the 1953 state election, Baxter successfully contested the electoral district of Norman as a candidate of the Labor and entered the Queensland Legislative Assembly. He held the seat in the 1956 and 1957 elections.

At the 1960 election, he successfully contested the neighbouring seat of Hawthorne, which he retained in 1963. He was not pre-selected as the ALP candidate for the 1966 election (Thomas Burton, assistant secretary of the Printing Employees Union was chosen) so he contested as an independent Labor candidate, for which he was expelled from the ALP. However, on election day (28 May 1966), he lost to Liberal candidate, Bill Kaus.

== Later life ==
Baxter died on 5 July 1978 in Brisbane. He was buried at Balmoral Cemetery, Brisbane on 7 July 1978.

== See also ==
- Members of the Queensland Legislative Assembly, 1953–1956; 1956–1957; 1957–1960; 1960–1963; 1963–1966

Parliament of Queensland
Preceded by Louis Luckins	Member for Norman; 1953–1960	Succeeded by Fred Bromley
New seat	Member for Hawthorne; 1960–1966	Succeeded by Bill Kaus
