= Henry McKechnie =

Australian politician

Member of the Queensland Legislative Assembly for Carnarvon
- In office 1 June 1963 – 24 October 1974
- Preceded by: Paul Hilton
- Succeeded by: Peter McKechnie

Personal details
- Born: Henry Arthur McKechnie; 14 March 1915 Barraba, New South Wales, Australia
- Died: 2 January 1984 (aged 68) Toowoomba, Queensland, Australia
- Party: Country Party
- Spouse(s): Heather May Coulton (m.1936 d.1950), Myrtle May Pfingst (m. 1952 d.1972), Agnes Stella Boucher (m.1973 d.2021)
- Relations: Peter McKechnie (son)
- Occupation: Wheat grower, Shearer, Ringbarker

Henry Arthur McKechnie (14 March 1915 – 2 January 1984) was a wheat grower, and member of the Queensland Legislative Assembly.

== Early days ==
McKechnie was born in Barraba, New South Wales, to parents William John McKechnie, and his wife Eileen Ester (née Brett) and educated at Barraba Public and Armidale high schools. In the 1930s he was a Shearer and Ringbarker, and from 1942 until the end of World War Two he served in the 8th Battalion Volunteer Defence Corps (QLD). In 1952 he was a Wheat grower.

== Political career ==
Having first served as a Councillor on Waggamba Shire, McKechnie, for the Country Party, in 1963 defeated the long serving member for Carnarvon, Paul Hilton. He was the Minister for Local Government and Electricity from 1972 until his retirement from politics in 1974.

McKechnie suffered a serious stroke in 1974 forcing his retirement from politics and at the state election held just over a month later, his son Peter won Carnarvon, becoming the only father and son to have served in the Queensland cabinet in the 20th century.

He was the foundation Secretary of the Goondiwindi Graziers Association, a member of the Queensland United Graziers Association and Grain Growers Association. He was patron of the Goondiwindi Show Society, the Jockey Club, and the International Club.

The Glenlyon Dam and the CWA students hostel are both monuments to his hard work for the electorate.

== Personal life ==
McKechnie was married three times, firstly to Heather May Coulton and together had three sons and one daughter. Heather died in 1950 and two years later he married Myrle May Pfingst and together had one son and three daughters. Myrle died in 1972 and a year later he married Agnes Stella Boucher.

During his younger days he played Rugby league for Goondiwindi and in later life was a trustee of several golf and bowling clubs. McKechnie died in Toowoomba 1984.

Parliament of Queensland
| Preceded by Paul Hilton | Member for Carnarvon; 1963–1974 | Succeeded by Peter McKechnie |
