= Bill Kaus =

Australian politician and businessman

Bill Kaus DFC

Member of the Queensland Legislative Assembly for Hawthorne
- In office 28 May 1966 – 27 May 1972
- Preceded by: William Baxter
- Succeeded by: Seat abolished

Member of the Queensland Legislative Assembly for Mansfield
- In office 27 May 1972 – 1 November 1986
- Preceded by: New seat
- Succeeded by: Craig Sherrin

Personal details
- Born: William Bernard Kaus; 24 May 1923 Kangaroo Point, Queensland, Australia
- Died: 20 December 2006 (aged 83) Brisbane, Queensland, Australia
- Party: National Party
- Other political affiliations: Liberal Party
- Spouse: Neth Florette Hutchinson (m.1942)
- Occupation: Businessman

William Bernard Kaus (24 May 1923 – 20 December 2006) was a businessman and member of the Queensland Legislative Assembly.

== Biography ==
Kaus was born at Kangaroo Point, Queensland, to parents William Rahman Kaus and his wife Doreen May (née Baker). He was involved in the family business, Kaus Bros Bedding Manufacturers.

In World War II he joined the Royal Australian Air Force and was assigned as a Flying officer to the 161 Squadron. He was awarded the Distinguished Flying Cross and France's highest honour, the Legion of Honour in 2005.

On 12 June 1948 Kaus married Neth Florette Hutchinson and together had two sons and two daughters (one of whom was the federal MP Andrea West). He died in December 2006 in Brisbane and was cremated at the Mt Thompson Crematorium.

== Public career ==
Kaus, for the Liberal Party, won the seat of Hawthorne at the 1966 Queensland state election. He was the member for Hawthorne until it was abolished before the 1972 state election. Kaus then represented the seat of Mansfield from 1972 until 1986 state election. In 1983, he switch parties and joined the National Party after losing preselection by the Liberals.

Kaus had many roles in Parliament and his party including:

- Member, Government Party Committees: Treasury; Local Government, Main Roads and Racing; Transport; Tourism, National Parks, Sport and the Arts
- Secretary of the Hawthorne Branch of the Liberal Party, 1966
- Secretary of the Parliamentary Liberal Party, 1967 – 1980
- Member of the Government Party Committees: Justice; Health; Tourism; Transport, 1969 – 1972
- Member of the Government Party Committees: Health; Tourism, Sport and Welfare; Transport, 1972 – 1974
- Member of the Government Party Committees: Community and Welfare Services, Sport; Transport; Local Government and Main Roads; Tourism and Marine Services; Health, 1975 – 1977
- Member of the Government Party Committees: Local Government and Main Roads; Culture, National Parks and Recreation; Transport; Works and Housing, 1978 – 1980
- Member of the Government Party Committees: Commerce and Industry; Employment and Labour Relations; Local Government, Main Roads and Police; Tourism, National Parks, Sport and the Arts, 1981 – 1983
- Deputy Government Whip
- Temporary Chairman of Committees from 1975 until 1983
- Delegate to the 28th Commonwealth Parliamentary Association Conference, The Bahamas
- Alternate Delegate to the Australian Constitutional Convention in 1985

Kaus was a keen sportsman, especially in cricket, football, shooting and bowls. He was an inaugural Member of the Queensland Cricketers Club and President of the Queensland Rifle Association. He was also responsible for the introduction of yellow rain coats for schoolchildren and the Lollipop Road Safety personnel.

Parliament of Queensland
Preceded by William Baxter	Member for Hawthorne; 1966–1972	Abolished
New seat	Member for Mansfield; 1972–1986	Succeeded by Craig Sherrin
