= Electoral district of Norman =

Norman Queensland—Legislative Assembly
- State: Queensland
- Created: 1950
- Abolished: 1972
- Namesake: Norman Park, Queensland
- Demographic: Metropolitan
- Coordinates: 27°29′S 153°03′E

The electoral district of Norman was a Legislative Assembly electorate in the state of Queensland, Australia.

== History ==
Norman was created in the 1949 redistribution, taking effect at the 1950 state election, and existed until the 1972 state election. It centred on East Brisbane and Norman Park.

When Norman was abolished in 1972, most of its area was incorporated into the district of South Brisbane.

== Members ==
The following people were elected in the seat of Norman:

Member	Party	Term	Notes
Louis Luckins	Liberal	1950–1953	Luckins previously represented Maree (1944–1950). He retired at the 1960 state election.
William Baxter	Labor	1953–1960	Baxter subsequently represented Hawthorne (1960–1966)
Fred Bromley	Labor	1960–1972	Bromley subsequently represented South Brisbane (1972–1974)
