= Electoral district of Townsville North =

Townsville North Queensland—Legislative Assembly
- State: Queensland
- Created: 1960
- Abolished: 1972
- Namesake: Townsville
- Demographic: Urban
- Coordinates: 19°15′S 146°48′E

The electoral district of Townsville North was a Legislative Assembly electorate in the state of Queensland, Australia.

== History ==
Townsville North was created in the 1959 redistribution, taking effect at the 1960 state election. The Electoral district of Townsville was split into Townsville North and Townsville South.

Townsville North was abolished at the 1972 state election, the outer portion forming the newly recreated Electoral district of Townsville and the inner city portion forming part of the new Electoral district of Townsville West.

== Members ==
The following people were elected in the seat of Townsville North:

Member	Party	Term
Perc Tucker	Labor	1960–1972

Tucker went on to represent Townsville West 1972 to 1974.

== See also ==
- Electoral districts of Queensland
- Members of the Queensland Legislative Assembly by year
- Category:Members of the Queensland Legislative Assembly by name
