= Electoral district of Rockhampton South =

Rockhampton South Queensland—Legislative Assembly
- State: Queensland
- Created: 1960
- Abolished: 1972
- Namesake: Rockhampton
- Demographic: Rural
- Coordinates: 23°23′S 150°31′E

The electoral district of Rockhampton South was a Legislative Assembly electorate in the state of Queensland, Australia.

== History ==
Rockhampton South was established during the 1959 redistribution and became effective for the 1960 state election. It remained in existence until the 1972 state election.

Following its abolition in 1972, the area previously covered by Rockhampton South was incorporated into the district of Rockhampton.

== Members ==
The following people were elected in the seat of Rockhampton South:

Member	Party	Term
Rex Pilbeam	Liberal	1960–1969
Keith Wright	Labor	1969–1972
