= Fred Bromley =

Australian politician

Fred Bromley OAM, JP
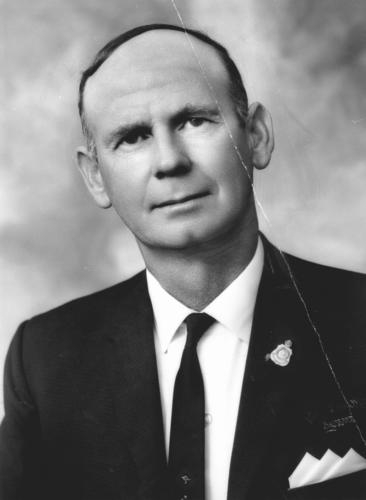

Member of the Queensland Legislative Assembly for Norman
- In office 28 May 1960 – 27 May 1972
- Preceded by: William Baxter
- Succeeded by: Seat abolished

Member of the Queensland Legislative Assembly for South Brisbane
- In office 27 May 1972 – 7 December 1974
- Preceded by: Col Bennett
- Succeeded by: Colin Lamont

Personal details
- Born: Fred Phillip Bromley; 24 July 1917 Nottingham, England
- Died: 14 May 1988 (aged 70) Brisbane, Queensland, Australia
- Party: Labor Party
- Spouse: Beryl Lillian Williams (m.1941)
- Occupation: Dental technician

Fred Phillip Bromley OAM (24 July 1917 – 14 May 1988) was a dental technician and member of the Queensland Legislative Assembly.

Bromley was born at Carrington, a small suburb of Nottingham, England, to Thomas Llewelyn Bromley and his wife Amanda (née Hopkins) and arrived in Queensland in 1919. After attending Toowong State School he went on to study to be a dental technician at Brisbane Technical College.

In World War II, he joined the Australian Army and served in the 2/1 Dental Unit until his discharge in February 1945.

== Political career ==
Representing the ALP, Bromley won the seat of Norman. at the 1960 Queensland state election, taking over the seat from fellow Labor member, William Baxter who had moved to the neighbouring seat of Hawthorne.

He remained as member for Norman until 1972 when the seat was abolished and move to the seat of South Brisbane. His time there was short lived as he lost the seat when the Labor Party was reduced to just eleven members in 1974.

== Personal life ==
On 17 December 1941, Bromley married Beryl Lillian Williams and together had one daughter.

Bromley died in Brisbane in 1988.

Parliament of Queensland
Preceded by William Baxter	Member for Norman; 1960–1972	Abolished
Preceded by Col Bennett	Member for South Brisbane; 1972–1974	Succeeded by Colin Lamont
