= Electoral district of Yeronga =

Former state electoral district of Queensland, Australia

Yeronga Queensland—Legislative Assembly
- State: Queensland
- Created: 1950
- Abolished: 2001
- Namesake: Yeronga

Yeronga was an electoral district of the Legislative Assembly in the Australian state of Queensland from 1950 to 2001.

The district was based in the southern suburbs of Brisbane and named for the suburb of Yeronga.

== Members for Yeronga ==
Member	Party	Term
Winston Noble	Liberal	1950–1964
Norm Lee	Liberal	1964–1989
Matt Foley	Labor	1989–2001

== See also ==
- Electoral districts of Queensland
- Members of the Queensland Legislative Assembly by year
- Category:Members of the Queensland Legislative Assembly by name
