= Cec Carey =

Australian politician

Member of the Queensland Legislative Assembly for Albert
- In office 28 May 1960 – 26 Dec 1969
- Preceded by: New seat
- Succeeded by: Bill Heatley

Personal details
- Born: Cecil Charles Carey; 21 September 1907 Toowoomba, Queensland, Australia
- Died: 26 December 1969 (aged 62) Brisbane, Queensland, Australia
- Party: Country Party
- Spouse: Melba May Pain (m.1936)
- Occupation: Dairy farmer

Cecil Charles Carey (21 September 1907 – 26 December 1969) was a member of the Queensland Legislative Assembly.

== Biography ==
Carey was born in Toowoomba, Queensland, the son of Richard Cecil Carey and his wife Mary Jane (née Mason). He was educated at Southport State Primary and High Schools and by 1934 was the manager of his father's grocery business. He later owned and managed a 500-acre dairy farm at Mudgeeraba and was a director of Wood's Transport and W Wood Holdings Pty Ltd. By 1956 he was the chairman of Cecil C Carey Pty Ltd.

On 18 July 1936 Carey married Melba May Pain and together had a son and daughter. He died on Boxing Day, 1969.

== Public career ==
At the 1960 Queensland state election, Carey, the candidate for the Country Party, won the re-established seat of Albert. He held the seat for the next three elections, dying in office in 1969. At the subsequent by-election in 1970, the Country Party lost Albert to Bill Heatley of the Liberal Party.

Carey was a member of the Totalizator Agency Board, the Gold Coast Turf Club, and the Gold Coast Branch of the Red Cross. Also a committee member of the Gold Coast Rugby League, Carey was President of the Gold Coast Senior Citizens Social Club, the Queensland Retail Traders' Association, and the Federal President of the Master Grocers and Storekeepers' Association.

Parliament of Queensland
New seat	Member for Albert; 1960–1969	Succeeded by Bill Heatley
