= Col Bennett =

Australian politician

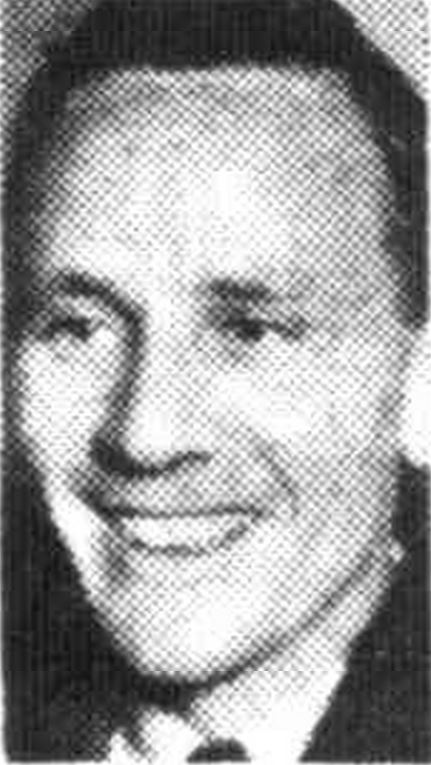
- Col Bennett, 1949

Member of the Queensland Legislative Assembly for South Brisbane
- In office 28 May 1960 – 27 May 1972
- Preceded by: Vince Gair
- Succeeded by: Fred Bromley

Personal details
- Born: Colin James Bennett; 10 May 1919 Townsville, Queensland, Australia
- Died: 12 June 2002 (aged 83) Brisbane, Queensland, Australia
- Resting place: South Brisbane Cemetery
- Party: Labor
- Spouse: Eileen Jocumsen (m.1942 d.2013)
- Education: University of Queensland
- Occupation: Barrister

Colin James Bennett (10 May 1919 – 12 June 2002) was a barrister and a member of the Queensland Legislative Assembly.

== Early life ==
Bennett was born in Townsville, Queensland, to parents Walter Henry Bennett and his wife Olive Gertrude Jessica (née Gordon). Educated at catholic and state primary schools, he then attended St Joseph's College, Nudgee in Brisbane and University of Queensland where he studied law and became chairman of the University of Queensland Students Council.

In 1941, he began his legal career as a Law Clerk before spending a year as Maths Master at Brisbane Grammar School in 1942. Bennett joined the RAAF in 1943, holding the rank of leading aircraftman when he was discharged in July, 1945. After the war, Bennett joined the Commonwealth Crown Law Office, serving there for three years until he commenced his private practice as a barrister in 1948.

== Political career ==
Bennett first entered politics in 1949 when he won the Brisbane City Council ward of Kurilpa for Labor in a by-election to replace Thomas Moores, who had moved to state politics. He led the Municipal Labor Party for ten years and from 1952 until 1955 he was Vice-Mayor to Frank Roberts. He then retired as an alderman in 1961.

At the 1960 Queensland election, Bennett was a candidate for South Brisbane where his opponent was former ALP premier Vince Gair, who since 1957 had been leader of the Queensland Labor Party. Bennett defeated Gair, and went on to hold the seat until, along with Ed Casey and Merv Thackeray, he was disendorsed before the 1972 state election. Bennett stood as an independent and gained 19.6 percent of the vote but was defeated by the official Labor candidate, Fred Bromley.

In 1962, allegations of corruption were raised about the Queensland Police Force, and in particular, Commissioner Frank Bischof. Bennett weighed into the debate amid public complaints and the lack of responsible action from Bischof. A Royal Commission was held to investigate these claims, in particular, the issue of prostitution being conducted from the National Hotel in Brisbane. A report was tabled in April 1964 but one year later Bennett again raised issues of police misconduct and was subsequently suspended from the house for 5 days.

Bennett was known to "distinguished himself with his fists" on occasions. In December 1963, he punched Greg Kehoe, a former fellow Labor member who had stood against Bennett as the QLP candidate at the state election held six months previously. Kehoe had to be taken to hospital with a broken tooth. Kehoe had also broken a finger whilst trying to retaliate. He frequently clashed with Tom Aikens and on one occasion Aikens alleged that a 'peeved' Mr Bennett had let down four tyres of a car parked in his lot at the Inns of Court.

Bennett was an active member of the Labor Party. He was at one time secretary of the Coorparoo Branch and for 20 years was president of the Griffith Federal Division Executive.

== Personal life ==
On 21 November 1942, Bennett married Eileen Jocumsen (died 2013) and together had three sons and five daughters. Eileen was founder of the St Veronica Welfare Centre, an association for underprivileged children. As well as his political activity, Bennett was involved in many other associations. He was a member of the Newman Society, the Brisbane and South Coast Hospitals Board, the Federated Clerks and Australian Workers Unions, the Lions Club; and the Johnsonian Club. He was Junior President at the Southern Suburbs District Rugby League Football Club (1951). He was also patron and life member of the Returned and Services League of Australia (South Brisbane branch). A keen swimmer and tennis player, he was a member and honorary legal adviser for many sporting and charitable organisations.

Bennett died in June 2002 and was buried in South Brisbane Cemetery.

Bennett Chambers Group, a Barristers’ Chambers, located on Level 6 of the Inns of Court building, Brisbane, was named in Colin Bennett's memory. The Chambers seeks to espouse Bennett's philosophy that all people are deserving of legal representation and that a level playing field in law only existed where well trained and committed barristers were prepared to vigorously advance their clients interests.

Parliament of Queensland
Preceded by Vince Gair	Member for South Brisbane; 1960–1972	Succeeded by Fred Bromley
