= Electoral district of Hawthorne =

Hawthorne Queensland—Legislative Assembly
- State: Queensland
- Created: 1960
- Abolished: 1972
- Namesake: Hawthorne, Queensland

Hawthorne was an electoral district of the Legislative Assembly in the Australian state of Queensland from 1960 to 1972.

It was established in the redistribution before the 1960 election from parts of the former district of Norman and the district of Bulimba.

It was abolished ahead of the 1972 election and its areas absorbed into surrounding districts, mostly Bulimba.

== Members for Hawthorne ==
Member	Party	Term
Bill Baxter	Labor	1960–1966
Bill Baxter	Independent	1966
Bill Kaus	Liberal	1966–1972

== See also ==
- Electoral districts of Queensland
- Members of the Queensland Legislative Assembly by year
- Category:Members of the Queensland Legislative Assembly by name
