= Results of the 1980 Queensland state election =

Queensland state election, 29 November 1980 Legislative Assembly << 1977–1983 >>
Enrolled voters	1,341,365				
Votes cast	1,192,893		Turnout	88.93%	–2.42%
Informal votes	18,008		Informal	1.51%	–0.02%
Summary of votes by party
Party	Primary votes	%	Swing	Seats	Change
Labor	487,493	41.49%	–1.34%	25	+2
National	328,262	27.94%	+0.79%	35	±0
Liberal	316,272	26.92%	+1.70%	22	–2
Democrats	16,222	1.38%	–0.23%	0	±0
Progress	4,384	0.37%	–1.13%	0	±0
Independent	20,880	1.78%	+0.09%	0	±0
Others	1,372	0.12%	+0.12%	0	±0
Total	1,174,885			82	

This is a list of electoral district results for the 1980 Queensland state election.

== Results by electoral district ==
=== Albert ===
1980 Queensland state election: Albert
Party	Candidate	Votes	%	±%
National	Ivan Gibbs	8,730	44.8	−8.5
Labor	Harry Zaphir	6,565	33.7	−9.6
Liberal	John Juett	3,342	17.1	+17.1
Democrats	Peter Woolley	501	2.6	+2.6
Independent	Reginald Campbell	351	1.8	+1.8
Total formal votes		19,489	98.1	+0.2
Informal votes		383	1.9	−0.2
Turnout		19,872	85.9	−3.5
Two-party-preferred result
National	Ivan Gibbs	11,877	60.9	+5.9
Labor	Harry Zaphir	7,612	39.1	−5.9
National hold		Swing	+5.9	

=== Archerfield ===
1980 Queensland state election: Archerfield
Party	Candidate	Votes	%	±%
Labor	Kevin Hooper	9,335	64.8	−1.9
National	Allen Muir	2,357	16.3	+3.5
Liberal	Alan Bavister	2,167	15.0	−5.6
Pensioner	Miriam Cope	274	1.9	+1.9
Socialist	Mary Simmons	154	1.1	+1.1
Independent	Norman Eather	128	0.9	+0.9
Total formal votes		14,415	97.7	+0.1
Informal votes		334	2.3	−0.1
Turnout		14,749	86.8	−4.0
Two-party-preferred result
Labor	Kevin Hooper	10,255	71.1	+2.7
National	Allen Muir	4,160	28.9	+28.9
Labor hold		Swing	+2.7	

=== Ashgrove ===
1980 Queensland state election: Ashgrove
Party	Candidate	Votes	%	±%
Liberal	John Greenwood	6,883	43.7	−7.1
Labor	Pat Comben	6,378	40.5	−2.9
Democrats	Cheryl Paton	1,967	12.5	+12.5
Progress	Owen Pershouse	510	3.2	−2.7
Total formal votes		15,738	98.7	−0.3
Informal votes		209	1.3	+0.3
Turnout		15,947	89.7	−2.5
Two-party-preferred result
Liberal	John Greenwood	7,927	50.4	−4.5
Labor	Pat Comben	7,811	49.6	+4.5
Liberal hold		Swing	−4.5	

=== Aspley ===
1980 Queensland state election: Aspley
Party	Candidate	Votes	%	±%
National	Leonard Brydges	5,259	31.7	+31.7
Liberal	Beryce Nelson	5,143	31.0	−30.5
Labor	John Duncan	4,646	28.0	−10.5
Democrats	Leslie Mundt	1,428	8.6	+8.6
Progress	Gregory Curry	129	0.8	+0.8
Total formal votes		16,605	98.5	−0.2
Informal votes		254	1.5	+0.2
Turnout		16,859	90.4	−2.6
Two-candidate-preferred result
Liberal	Beryce Nelson	10,619	63.9	+2.4
National	Leonard Brydges	5,986	36.1	+36.1
Liberal hold		Swing	N/A	

=== Auburn ===
1980 Queensland state election: Auburn
Party	Candidate	Votes	%	±%
National	Neville Harper	6,366	67.3	−0.5
Labor	Ray Barker	2,833	30.0	+4.2
Progress	David Trevilyan	261	2.8	−3.6
Total formal votes		9,460	99.4	+0.4
Informal votes		59	0.6	−0.4
Turnout		9,519	92.0	−0.9
Two-party-preferred result
National	Neville Harper	6,536	69.1	−3.2
Labor	Ray Barker	2,924	30.9	+3.2
National hold		Swing	−3.2	

=== Balonne ===
1980 Queensland state election: Balonne
Party	Candidate	Votes	%	±%
National	Don Neal	4,938	68.7	−3.2
Labor	John Barrett	2,249	31.3	+3.2
Total formal votes		7,187	98.5	+0.2
Informal votes		107	1.5	−0.2
Turnout		7,294	88.7	−0.8
National hold		Swing	−3.2	

=== Barambah ===
1980 Queensland state election: Barambah
Party	Candidate	Votes	%	±%
National	Joh Bjelke-Petersen	8,011	80.4	+2.1
Labor	Brian Hawkes	1,670	16.8	−4.9
Independent	Henry Collins	279	2.8	+2.8
Total formal votes		9,960	99.0	+0.5
Informal votes		100	1.0	−0.5
Turnout		10,060	91.9	−1.9
Two-party-preferred result
National	Joh Bjelke-Petersen	8,150	81.8	+3.5
Labor	Brian Hawkes	1,810	18.2	−3.5
National hold		Swing	+3.5	

=== Barron River ===
1980 Queensland state election: Barron River
Party	Candidate	Votes	%	±%
National	Martin Tenni	7,236	42.7	−7.5
Labor	Keith De Lacy	7,668	45.2	−4.6
Liberal	Lionel Van Dorssen	1,578	9.3	+9.3
Democrats	Bruce Alexander	470	2.8	+2.8
Total formal votes		16,952	98.9	+0.8
Informal votes		190	1.1	−0.8
Turnout		17,142	86.1	−3.4
Two-party-preferred result
National	Martin Tenni	8,605	50.8	+0.6
Labor	Keith De Lacy	8,347	49.2	−0.6
National hold		Swing	+0.6	

=== Brisbane Central ===
1980 Queensland state election: Brisbane Central
Party	Candidate	Votes	%	±%
Labor	Brian Davis	7,279	53.6	+0.9
Liberal	Robert Wright	5,604	41.3	−2.6
Communist	Murray Broad	699	5.2	+5.2
Total formal votes		13,582	97.2	−0.6
Informal votes		385	2.8	+0.6
Turnout		13,967	84.3	−4.0
Two-party-preferred result
Labor	Brian Davis	7,838	57.7	+2.3
Liberal	Robert Wright	5,744	42.3	−2.3
Labor hold		Swing	+2.3	

=== Bulimba ===
1980 Queensland state election: Bulimba
Party	Candidate	Votes	%	±%
Labor	Ron McLean	7,657	54.6	−5.2
Liberal	Brian Kirkham	6,380	45.4	+5.2
Total formal votes		14,037	97.8	−0.4
Informal votes		308	2.2	+0.4
Turnout		14,345	88.9	−3.1
Labor hold		Swing	−5.2	

=== Bundaberg ===
1980 Queensland state election: Bundaberg
Party	Candidate	Votes	%	±%
Labor	Jim Blake	7,694	54.3	+5.6
National	Bryan Conquest	4,991	35.2	+3.6
Liberal	Graham Quirk	787	5.5	−7.6
Democrats	Lola Lomax	706	5.0	+5.0
Total formal votes		14,178	99.2	+0.2
Informal votes		120	0.8	−0.2
Turnout		14,298	91.5	−2.0
Two-party-preferred result
Labor	Jim Blake	8,270	58.3	+3.9
National	Bryan Conquest	5,908	41.7	−3.9
Labor hold		Swing	+3.9	

=== Burdekin ===
1980 Queensland state election: Burdekin
Party	Candidate	Votes	%	±%
National	Val Bird	5,783	54.5	−5.8
Labor	Peter Rehbein	4,836	45.5	+5.8
Total formal votes		10,619	98.9	0.0
Informal votes		120	1.1	0.0
Turnout		10,739	91.5	−2.8
National hold		Swing	−5.8	

=== Burnett ===
1980 Queensland state election: Burnett
Party	Candidate	Votes	%	±%
National	Claude Wharton	8,212	69.8	+0.5
Labor	Edgar Roberts	3,544	30.2	−0.5
Total formal votes		11,756	99.0	+0.3
Informal votes		121	1.0	−0.3
Turnout		11,877	91.6	+0.2
National hold		Swing	+0.5	

=== Caboolture ===
1980 Queensland state election: Caboolture
Party	Candidate	Votes	%	±%
National	Des Frawley	8,082	42.2	−16.8
Labor	John McLoughlin	4,567	23.8	−3.6
Labor	Frank Hill	3,174	16.6	+16.6
Liberal	Virginia Day	2,921	15.2	+15.2
Independent	John Ferguson	422	2.2	+2.2
Total formal votes		19,166	98.1	−0.1
Informal votes		378	1.9	+0.1
Turnout		19,544	89.5	−2.3
Two-party-preferred result
National	Des Frawley	10,598	55.3	−3.7
Labor	John McLoughlin	8,568	44.7	+3.7
National hold		Swing	−3.7	

=== Cairns ===
1980 Queensland state election: Cairns
Party	Candidate	Votes	%	±%
Labor	Ray Jones	9,471	58.7	+1.6
National	Nigel Ette	3,928	24.3	−5.4
Liberal	Francis Hoyal	2,359	14.6	+8.0
Independent	Melvin Stewart	290	1.8	+1.8
Independent	John Stamp	90	0.6	+0.6
Total formal votes		16,138	98.3	0.0
Informal votes		274	1.7	0.0
Turnout		16,412	85.8	−3.0
Two-party-preferred result
Labor	Ray Jones	10,310	63.9	+2.5
National	Nigel Ette	5,828	36.1	−2.5
Labor hold		Swing	+2.5	

=== Callide ===
1980 Queensland state election: Callide
Party	Candidate	Votes	%	±%
National	Lindsay Hartwig	8,252	65.8	+0.5
Labor	Alan Morris	4,293	34.2	−0.5
Total formal votes		12,545	98.4	−0.3
Informal votes		203	1.6	+0.3
Turnout		12,748	91.1	−0.7
National hold		Swing	+0.5	

=== Carnarvon ===
1980 Queensland state election: Carnarvon
Party	Candidate	Votes	%	±%
National	Peter McKechnie	5,921	61.8	−1.7
Labor	Johannes De Roo	3,659	38.2	+1.7
Total formal votes		9,580	98.7	+0.7
Informal votes		126	1.3	−0.7
Turnout		9,706	91.3	−1.4
National hold		Swing	−1.7	

=== Chatsworth ===
1980 Queensland state election: Chatsworth
Party	Candidate	Votes	%	±%
Labor	Terry Mackenroth	9,256	58.2	+7.1
Liberal	Annette Dunstan	6,646	41.8	−7.1
Total formal votes		15,902	98.3	+0.1
Informal votes		281	1.7	−0.1
Turnout		16,183	90.8	−2.5
Labor hold		Swing	+7.1	

=== Condamine ===
1980 Queensland state election: Condamine
Party	Candidate	Votes	%	±%
National	Vic Sullivan	7,877	67.9	+5.7
Labor	Allan Clancey	2,843	24.5	+0.4
Progress	Lindsay Sturgess	872	7.5	−3.8
Total formal votes		11,592	99.3	+0.2
Informal votes		84	0.7	−0.2
Turnout		11,676	92.4	−0.2
Two-party-preferred result
National	Vic Sullivan	8,444	72.8	+1.4
Labor	Allan Clancey	3,148	27.2	−1.4
National hold		Swing	+1.4	

=== Cook ===
1980 Queensland state election: Cook
Party	Candidate	Votes	%	±%
Labor	Bob Scott	4,263	59.8	+11.4
National	D.A. Young	1,282	18.0	−23.2
National	Justin Smith	912	12.8	+12.8
Liberal	Evelyn Scott	669	9.4	+9.4
Total formal votes		7,126	97.9	+0.1
Informal votes		155	2.1	−0.1
Turnout		7,281	81.3	−1.4
Two-party-preferred result
Labor	Bob Scott	4,447	62.4	+8.5
National	D.A. Young	2,679	37.6	−8.5
Labor hold		Swing	+8.5	

=== Cooroora ===
1980 Queensland state election: Cooroora
Party	Candidate	Votes	%	±%
National	Gordon Simpson	10,457	54.2	+2.5
Labor	Sydney Appleby	5,230	27.1	−2.1
Liberal	John Barbeler	2,821	14.6	−4.4
Independent	Donald Sime	798	4.1	+4.1
Total formal votes		19,306	98.6	−0.5
Informal votes		280	1.4	+0.5
Turnout		19,586	88.9	−3.1
Two-party-preferred result
National	Gordon Simpson	12,821	66.4	−1.7
Labor	Sydney Appleby	6,485	33.6	+1.7
National hold		Swing	−1.7	

=== Cunningham ===
1980 Queensland state election: Cunningham
Party	Candidate	Votes	%	±%
National	Tony Elliott	8,989	70.7	−4.7
Labor	Robert Ball	2,038	16.0	+2.3
Liberal	Richard Barnard	1,679	13.2	+13.2
Total formal votes		12,706	99.4	+0.2
Informal votes		96	0.8	−0.2
Turnout		12,787	91.4	−2.0
Two-party-preferred result
National	Tony Elliott	10,206	80.3	−0.3
Labor	Robert Ball	2,500	19.7	+0.3
National hold		Swing	−0.3	

=== Everton ===
1980 Queensland state election: Everton
Party	Candidate	Votes	%	±%
Labor	Glen Milliner	6,984	45.4	−4.1
Liberal	Brian Burke	4,258	27.6	−17.8
National	Donald Munro	3,211	20.8	+20.8
Democrats	Mark Taylor	946	6.1	+6.1
Total formal votes		15,399	98.9	−0.1
Informal votes		173	1.1	+0.1
Turnout		15,572	91.0	−1.9
Two-party-preferred result
Labor	Glen Milliner	7,814	50.7	−0.3
Liberal	Brian Burke	7,585	49.3	+0.3
Labor hold		Swing	−0.3	

=== Fassifern ===
1980 Queensland state election: Fassifern
Party	Candidate	Votes	%	±%
National	Selwyn Muller	8,827	41.7	−19.7
Labor	Ray Parker	7,322	34.6	−4.0
Liberal	Thomas O'Toole	5,041	23.8	+23.8
Total formal votes		21,190	98.7	+1.1
Informal votes		272	1.3	−1.1
Turnout		21,462	89.3	−2.7
Two-party-preferred result
National	Selwyn Muller	12,575	59.3	−2.1
Labor	Ray Parker	8,615	40.7	+2.1
National hold		Swing	−2.1	

=== Flinders ===
1980 Queensland state election: Flinders
Party	Candidate	Votes	%	±%
National	Bob Katter	4,993	56.0	+1.8
Labor	Thomas Greenwood	3,927	44.0	+2.4
Total formal votes		8,920	98.8	−0.1
Informal votes		106	1.2	+0.1
Turnout		9,026	86.2	−3.9
National hold		Swing	−1.1	

=== Greenslopes ===
1980 Queensland state election: Greenslopes
Party	Candidate	Votes	%	±%
Liberal	Bill Hewitt	8,623	62.3	+23.8
Labor	Graeme Kinnear	5,217	37.7	+8.0
Total formal votes		13,840	97.8	−1.1
Informal votes		312	2.2	+1.1
Turnout		14,152	89.0	−2.8
Liberal hold		Swing	−0.1	

=== Gregory ===
1980 Queensland state election: Gregory
Party	Candidate	Votes	%	±%
National	Bill Glasson	4,220	59.2	+2.4
Labor	Gordon Saunders	2,912	40.8	−2.4
Total formal votes		7,132	98.8	−0.1
Informal votes		86	1.2	+0.1
Turnout		7,218	87.5	+0.2
National hold		Swing	+2.4	

=== Gympie ===
1980 Queensland state election: Gympie
Party	Candidate	Votes	%	±%
National	Len Stephan	6,679	53.7	−7.8
Labor	Reginald Lawler	3,216	25.9	−2.1
Liberal	Minas Venardos	2,131	17.1	+17.1
Progress	William Runge	412	3.3	−7.2
Total formal votes		12,438	99.1	0.0
Informal votes		106	0.9	0.0
Turnout		12,544	94.8	+1.0
Two-party-preferred result
National	Len Stephan	8,492	68.3	−0.5
Labor	Reginald Lawler	3,946	31.7	+0.5
National hold		Swing	−0.5	

=== Hinchinbrook ===
1980 Queensland state election: Hinchinbrook
Party	Candidate	Votes	%	±%
National	Ted Row	5,555	49.6	−3.5
Labor	Norman Hart	3,665	32.7	−14.2
Independent	John Williams	1,171	10.5	+10.5
Independent	Des Bredhauer	814	7.3	+7.3
Total formal votes		11,205	97.1	−0.7
Informal votes		335	2.9	+0.7
Turnout		11,540	90.2	−2.0
Two-party-preferred result
National	Ted Row	6,629	59.2	+6.1
Labor	Norman Hart	4,576	40.8	−6.1
National hold		Swing	+6.1	

=== Ipswich ===
1980 Queensland state election: Ipswich
Party	Candidate	Votes	%	±%
Liberal	Llew Edwards	8,319	53.5	−0.7
Labor	Joseph Sciacca	6,434	41.4	−4.5
Independent	James Hayden	576	3.7	+3.7
International Socialist	Ian Rintoul	108	0.7	+0.7
National Front	Victor Robb	103	0.7	+0.7
Total formal votes		15,540	98.7	+0.2
Informal votes		201	1.3	−0.2
Turnout		15,741	91.8	−1.6
Two-party-preferred result
Liberal	Llew Edwards	8,566	55.1	+0.9
Labor	Joseph Sciacca	6,974	44.9	−0.9
Liberal hold		Swing	+0.9	

=== Ipswich West ===
1980 Queensland state election: Ipswich West
Party	Candidate	Votes	%	±%
Labor	David Underwood	8,280	52.3	−0.1
Liberal	Lawrence Pointing	4,814	30.4	+16.8
National	Neil Russell	2,742	17.3	−16.7
Total formal votes		15,836	98.9	0.0
Informal votes		180	1.1	0.0
Turnout		16,016	87.8	−3.4
Two-party-preferred result
Labor	David Underwood	8,573	54.1	−0.2
Liberal	Lawrence Pointing	7,263	45.9	+45.9
Labor hold		Swing	−0.2	

=== Isis ===
1980 Queensland state election: Isis
Party	Candidate	Votes	%	±%
National	Lin Powell	7,569	50.1	+1.7
Labor	Michael Edgar	5,466	36.2	−1.1
Liberal	David Cooper	1,231	8.1	−3.6
Democrats	Ronald Cullen	535	3.5	+3.5
Democrats	Mervyn Worth	302	2.0	+2.0
Total formal votes		15,103	98.7	−0.2
Informal votes		201	1.3	+0.2
Turnout		15,304	90.2	−2.0
Two-party-preferred result
National	Lin Powell	8,871	58.7	−0.5
Labor	Michael Edgar	6,232	41.3	+0.5
National hold		Swing	−0.5	

=== Ithaca ===
1980 Queensland state election: Ithaca
Party	Candidate	Votes	%	±%
Liberal	Col Miller	8,114	59.9	+6.4
Labor	Peter Venning	5,440	40.1	−2.8
Total formal votes		13,554	98.0	−0.7
Informal votes		272	2.0	+0.7
Turnout		13,826	87.3	−3.6
Liberal hold		Swing	+3.9	

=== Kurilpa ===
1980 Queensland state election: Kurilpa
Party	Candidate	Votes	%	±%
Liberal	Sam Doumany	7,158	50.2	+4.8
Labor	Maurice Dwyer	6,549	45.9	+6.3
Progress	Alvan Hawkes	562	3.9	+2.2
Total formal votes		14,269	98.0	−0.3
Informal votes		286	2.0	+0.3
Turnout		14,555	87.0	−2.9
Two-party-preferred result
Liberal	Sam Doumany	7,523	52.7	−0.3
Labor	Maurice Dwyer	6,746	47.3	+0.3
Liberal hold		Swing	−0.3	

=== Landsborough ===
1980 Queensland state election: Landsborough
Party	Candidate	Votes	%	±%
National	Mike Ahern	11,215	53.9	−14.3
Labor	Peter Byrne	5,051	24.3	−7.5
Liberal	Paul Kingsford	2,733	13.1	+13.1
Independent	Barbara Cansdell	1,795	8.6	+8.6
Total formal votes		20,794	99.0	+0.6
Informal votes		211	1.0	−0.6
Turnout		21,005	88.7	−2.2
Two-party-preferred result
National	Mike Ahern	14,453	69.5	+1.3
Labor	Peter Byrne	6,341	30.5	−1.3
National hold		Swing	+1.3	

=== Lockyer ===
1980 Queensland state election: Lockyer
Party	Candidate	Votes	%	±%
Liberal	Tony Bourke	5,286	33.3	−21.7
National	Tony FitzGerald	4,497	28.3	+28.3
Labor	Michael Forde	2,826	17.8	−1.8
National	Terence Day	2,603	16.4	+16.4
Democrats	Rae Capon	505	3.2	−5.6
Progress	Michael Berry	169	1.1	+1.1
Total formal votes		15,886	98.6	−0.4
Informal votes		223	1.4	+0.4
Turnout		16,109	90.9	−2.9
Two-candidate-preferred result
National	Tony FitzGerald	8,949	56.3	+56.3
Liberal	Tony Bourke	6,937	43.7	−28.8
National gain from Liberal		Swing	N/A	

=== Lytton ===
1980 Queensland state election: Lytton
Party	Candidate	Votes	%	±%
Labor	Tom Burns	10,543	73.6	+6.6
Liberal	Moyra Bidstrup	3,784	26.4	−6.6
Total formal votes		14,327	98.0	−0.5
Informal votes		297	2.0	+0.5
Turnout		14,624	89.4	−2.8
Labor hold		Swing	+6.6	

=== Mackay ===
1980 Queensland state election: Mackay
Party	Candidate	Votes	%	±%
Labor	Ed Casey	10,106	59.2	+2.1
National	Lionel Bevis	5,457	32.0	+9.2
Liberal	Kevin Dray	1,500	8.8	−3.7
Total formal votes		17,063	98.9	+0.5
Informal votes		190	1.1	−0.5
Turnout		17,253	88.3	−3.9
Two-party-preferred result
Labor	Ed Casey	10,518	61.6	−0.3
National	Lionel Bevis	6,545	38.4	+0.3
Labor hold		Swing	−0.3	

=== Mansfield ===
1980 Queensland state election: Mansfield
Party	Candidate	Votes	%	±%
Liberal	Bill Kaus	9,374	54.9	−1.9
Labor	John Fraser	6,819	40.0	+5.1
Progress	Des McKay	876	5.1	−3.2
Total formal votes		17,069	98.5	0.0
Informal votes		238	1.5	0.0
Turnout		17,335	90.5	−2.1
Two-party-preferred result
Liberal	Bill Kaus	9,943	58.3	−4.3
Labor	John Fraser	7,126	41.7	+4.3
Liberal hold		Swing	−4.3	

=== Maryborough ===
1980 Queensland state election: Maryborough
Party	Candidate	Votes	%	±%
Labor	Brendan Hansen	6,747	47.7	−2.5
Liberal	Gilbert Alison	6,676	47.2	−2.6
Democrats	Arthur Townsend	725	5.1	+5.1
Total formal votes		14,148	99.2	+0.2
Informal votes		109	0.8	−0.2
Turnout		14,257	92.3	−1.5
Two-party-preferred result
Labor	Brendan Hansen	7,154	50.6	+0.4
Liberal	Gilbert Alison	6,994	49.4	−0.4
Labor hold		Swing	+0.4	

=== Merthyr ===
1980 Queensland state election: Merthyr
Party	Candidate	Votes	%	±%
Liberal	Don Lane	7,334	54.5	+0.9
Labor	Barbara Dawson	6,116	45.5	+3.1
Total formal votes		13,450	97.1	−0.4
Informal votes		398	2.9	+0.4
Turnout		13,848	84.0	−4.6
Liberal hold		Swing	−1.9	

=== Mirani ===
1980 Queensland state election: Mirani
Party	Candidate	Votes	%	±%
Labor	Conrad Nicolai	4,728	38.4	−0.1
National	Jim Randell	4,592	37.2	−24.3
Independent	John Comerford	2,291	18.6	+18.6
Liberal	Leonard Goode	717	5.8	+5.8
Total formal votes		12,328	99.3	+0.6
Informal votes		86	0.7	−0.6
Turnout		12,414	91.2	−1.5
Two-party-preferred result
National	Jim Randell	6,533	53.0	−8.6
Labor	Conrad Nicolai	5,795	47.0	+8.6
National hold		Swing	−8.6	

=== Mount Coot-tha ===
1980 Queensland state election: Mount Coot-tha
Party	Candidate	Votes	%	±%
Liberal	Bill Lickiss	9,487	62.8	+0.3
Democrats	David Dalgarno	3,137	20.8	+20.8
Labor	Graham Kevin	2,489	16.5	−10.5
Total formal votes		15,114	98.8	−0.4
Informal votes		189	1.2	+0.4
Turnout		15,303	89.1	−2.8
Two-party-preferred result
Liberal	Bill Lickiss	11,024	72.9	+3.1
Labor	Graham Kevin	4,089	27.1	−3.1
Liberal hold		Swing	+3.1	

- The two party preferred vote was not counted between the Liberal and Democrat candidates for Mount Coot-tha.

=== Mount Gravatt ===
1980 Queensland state election: Mount Gravatt
Party	Candidate	Votes	%	±%
Liberal	Guelfi Scassola	7,006	43.8	+8.2
Labor	Marion McInnes	4,953	31.0	−5.9
National	Ian Henderson	4,031	25.2	+2.0
Total formal votes		15,990	98.8	+0.5
Informal votes		196	1.2	−0.5
Turnout		16,186	89.6	−2.4
Two-party-preferred result
Liberal	Guelfi Scassola	10,500	65.7	+5.3
Labor	Marion McInnes	5,490	34.3	−5.3
Liberal hold		Swing	+5.3	

=== Mount Isa ===
1980 Queensland state election: Mount Isa
Party	Candidate	Votes	%	±%
Labor	Tony McGrady	5,398	44.4	−2.3
National	Angelo Bertoni	5,209	42.8	−2.7
Liberal	Joyce Boyd	1,048	8.6	+8.6
Democrats	Ray Oldman	504	4.2	+4.2
Total formal votes		12,159	97.3	+1.2
Informal votes		331	2.7	−1.2
Turnout		12,490	84.0	−0.9
Two-party-preferred result
National	Angelo Bertoni	6,192	50.9	+0.3
Labor	Tony McGrady	5,967	49.1	−0.3
National hold		Swing	+0.3	

=== Mourilyan ===
1980 Queensland state election: Mourilyan
Party	Candidate	Votes	%	±%
Labor	Bill Eaton	5,139	51.3	+3.9
National	Vicky Kippin	4,875	48.7	+1.6
Total formal votes		10,014	98.8	+0.5
Informal votes		117	1.2	−0.5
Turnout		10,131	90.3	−2.3
Labor gain from National		Swing	+1.6	

=== Mulgrave ===
1980 Queensland state election: Mulgrave
Party	Candidate	Votes	%	±%
National	Max Menzel	4,739	44.6	−13.8
Labor	James Moses	4,041	38.1	−3.5
Liberal	Jean Huxley	1,840	17.3	+17.3
Total formal votes		10,620	99.1	+0.7
Informal votes		96	0.9	−0.7
Turnout		10,716	90.8	−1.5
Two-party-preferred result
National	Max Menzel	5,995	56.5	−1.9
Labor	James Moses	4,625	43.5	+1.9
National hold		Swing	−1.9	

=== Murrumba ===
1980 Queensland state election: Murrumba
Party	Candidate	Votes	%	±%
Labor	Joe Kruger	8,251	50.1	+3.6
National	Yvonne Chapman	5,041	30.6	+1.3
Liberal	Alfred Shaw	3,163	19.2	−4.9
Total formal votes		16,455	98.8	+0.9
Informal votes		203	1.2	−0.9
Turnout		16,658	90.2	−2.1
Two-party-preferred result
Labor	Joe Kruger	9,121	55.4	+4.0
National	Yvonne Chapman	7,334	44.6	−4.0
Labor hold		Swing	+4.0	

=== Nudgee ===
1980 Queensland state election: Nudgee
Party	Candidate	Votes	%	±%
Labor	Ken Vaughan	8,567	60.9	+2.2
Liberal	Gerald Connor	5,503	39.1	−2.2
Total formal votes		14,070	98.5	+0.4
Informal votes		210	1.5	−0.4
Turnout		14,280	90.7	−1.9
Labor hold		Swing	+2.2	

=== Nundah ===
1980 Queensland state election: Nundah
Party	Candidate	Votes	%	±%
Liberal	William Knox	8,237	59.6	+1.5
Labor	Owen Gazzard	5,587	40.4	−1.5
Total formal votes		13,824	98.3	+0.1
Informal votes		232	1.7	−0.1
Turnout		14,056	88.1	−2.9
Liberal hold		Swing	+1.5	

=== Peak Downs ===
1980 Queensland state election: Peak Downs
Party	Candidate	Votes	%	±%
National	Vince Lester	6,235	61.3	+3.5
Labor	William Coffey	3,721	36.6	−5.6
Independent	Anthony Whitfield	167	1.6	+1.6
Progress	Robin Wright	54	0.5	+0.5
Total formal votes		10,177	99.3	+0.9
Informal votes		72	0.7	−0.9
Turnout		10,249	88.9	−1.6
Two-party-preferred result
National	Vince Lester	6,320	62.1	+4.3
Labor	William Coffey	3,857	37.9	−4.3
National hold		Swing	+4.3	

=== Pine Rivers ===
1980 Queensland state election: Pine Rivers
Party	Candidate	Votes	%	±%
Liberal	Rob Akers	10,476	57.5	+7.5
Labor	June Willmot	7,747	42.5	−2.5
Total formal votes		18,223	98.0	−0.9
Informal votes		367	2.0	+0.9
Turnout		18,590	91.5	−1.7
Liberal hold		Swing	+4.1	

=== Port Curtis ===
1980 Queensland state election: Port Curtis
Party	Candidate	Votes	%	±%
Labor	Bill Prest	7,191	53.8	−4.8
National	Michael Crowley	4,341	32.5	+9.8
Liberal	John Mawer	1,656	12.4	−2.6
Liberal	Georgina Pickers	175	1.3	+1.3
Total formal votes		13,363	99.0	−0.1
Informal votes		133	1.0	+0.1
Turnout		13,496	90.4	−1.8
Two-party-preferred result
Labor	Bill Prest	7,695	57.6	−4.2
National	Michael Crowley	5,668	42.4	+4.2
Labor hold		Swing	−4.2	

=== Redcliffe ===
1980 Queensland state election: Redcliffe
Party	Candidate	Votes	%	±%
Liberal	Terry White	8,599	55.3	+26.0
Labor	Roderick Lugton	6,941	44.7	+7.6
Total formal votes		15,540	98.4	−0.2
Informal votes		248	1.6	+0.2
Turnout		15,788	92.0	−0.6
Liberal gain from National		Swing	N/A	

=== Redlands ===
1980 Queensland state election: Redlands
Party	Candidate	Votes	%	±%
National	John Goleby	8,836	42.4	+0.5
Labor	Con Sciacca	8,477	40.7	−0.7
Liberal	Peter Hunter	3,520	16.9	+0.2
Total formal votes		20,833	98.9	+0.3
Informal votes		236	1.1	−0.3
Turnout		21,069	90.9	−1.9
Two-party-preferred result
National	John Goleby	11,300	54.2	−1.2
Labor	Con Sciacca	9,533	45.8	+1.2
National hold		Swing	−1.2	

=== Rockhampton ===
1980 Queensland state election: Rockhampton
Party	Candidate	Votes	%	±%
Labor	Keith Wright	10,125	64.5	−0.1
National	Garnet Lincoln	3,965	25.3	+10.6
Liberal	Douglas Cuddy	1,603	10.2	−8.3
Total formal votes		15,693	99.1	+0.2
Informal votes		142	0.9	−0.2
Turnout		15,835	90.3	−2.9
Two-party-preferred result
Labor	Keith Wright	10,566	67.3	0.0
National	Garnet Lincoln	5,127	32.7	+32.7
Labor hold		Swing	0.0	

=== Rockhampton North ===
1980 Queensland state election: Rockhampton North
Party	Candidate	Votes	%	±%
Labor	Les Yewdale	9,978	57.9	−6.3
National	Robert Simpson	5,046	29.3	+15.3
Liberal	Keith Harris	1,381	8.0	−13.8
Independent	Patrick Carroll	757	4.4	+4.4
Socialist	Jeffrey Jones	86	0.5	+0.5
Total formal votes		17,248	99.2	+0.1
Informal votes		138	0.8	−0.1
Turnout		17,386	92.3	−3.0
Two-party-preferred result
Labor	Les Yewdale	10,730	62.2	−4.0
National	Robert Simpson	6,518	37.8	+37.8
Labor hold		Swing	−4.0	

=== Roma ===
1980 Queensland state election: Roma
Party	Candidate	Votes	%	±%
National	Ken Tomkins	4,706	65.4	+2.3
Labor	David Bowden	2,491	34.6	+1.9
Total formal votes		7,197	98.8	+0.1
Informal votes		88	1.2	−0.1
Turnout		7,285	88.6	−1.5
National hold		Swing	−0.6	

=== Salisbury ===
1980 Queensland state election: Salisbury
Party	Candidate	Votes	%	±%
Liberal	Rosemary Kyburz	7,949	46.3	−4.4
Labor	Bill Wilcox	7,722	45.0	−4.3
Independent	Mary Ellwood	1,496	8.7	+8.7
Total formal votes		17,167	98.1	+0.4
Informal votes		326	1.9	−0.4
Turnout		17,493	89.2	−2.3
Two-party-preferred result
Liberal	Rosemary Kyburz	8,973	52.3	+1.6
Labor	Bill Wilcox	8,194	47.7	−1.6
Liberal hold		Swing	+1.6	

=== Sandgate ===
1980 Queensland state election: Sandgate
Party	Candidate	Votes	%	±%
Labor	Nev Warburton	8,971	60.5	+4.5
Liberal	David Preston	4,027	27.1	−2.4
Coalitionist	Peter Jackman	1,530	10.3	+10.3
Independent	Anthony Catip	309	2.1	+2.1
Total formal votes		14,837	98.4	+0.1
Informal votes		240	1.6	−0.1
Turnout		15,077	89.4	−2.9
Two-party-preferred result
Labor	Nev Warburton	9,585	64.6	+6.6
Liberal	David Preston	5,252	35.4	−6.6
Labor hold		Swing	+6.6	

=== Sherwood ===
1980 Queensland state election: Sherwood
Party	Candidate	Votes	%	±%
Liberal	Angus Innes	9,004	54.7	−3.9
Labor	Peter Doyle	4,384	26.6	−8.6
National	Terrence Mahoney	2,762	16.8	+16.8
Progress	Judith Forbes	320	1.9	−4.2
Total formal votes		16,470	98.9	0.0
Informal votes		178	1.1	0.0
Turnout		16,648	89.7	−2.5
Two-party-preferred result
Liberal	Angus Innes	11,678	70.9	+8.0
Labor	Peter Doyle	4,792	29.1	−8.0
Liberal hold		Swing	+8.0	

=== Somerset ===
1980 Queensland state election: Somerset
Party	Candidate	Votes	%	±%
National	Bill Gunn	9,381	50.0	−12.4
Labor	Ron Hazelden	5,508	29.4	+3.3
Liberal	Owen Nugent	3,854	20.6	+20.6
Total formal votes		18,743	98.9	0.0
Informal votes		213	1.1	0.0
Turnout		18,956	90.9	−1.3
Two-party-preferred result
National	Bill Gunn	12,175	65.0	−2.9
Labor	Ron Hazelden	6,568	35.0	+2.9
National hold		Swing	−2.9	

=== South Brisbane ===
1980 Queensland state election: South Brisbane
Party	Candidate	Votes	%	±%
Labor	Jim Fouras	7,006	52.3	+0.4
Liberal	Colin Lamont	5,935	44.3	+0.7
Independent	Edward Grevsmuhl	444	3.3	+3.3
Total formal votes		13,385	97.5	+0.4
Informal votes		336	2.5	−0.4
Turnout		13,721	84.1	−4.0
Two-party-preferred result
Labor	Jim Fouras	7,228	54.0	+0.8
Liberal	Colin Lamont	6,157	46.0	−0.8
Labor hold		Swing	+0.8	

=== South Coast ===
1980 Queensland state election: South Coast
Party	Candidate	Votes	%	±%
National	Russ Hinze	8,049	44.1	−11.3
Labor	Philip Button	3,969	21.8	−15.1
Liberal	Ross Woods	2,404	13.2	+13.2
Liberal	Elizabeth Diamond	1,929	10.6	+10.6
Independent	Robert Neumann	1,394	7.6	+7.6
Coalitionist	Michael Carey	303	1.7	+1.7
Independent	Julia Freebury	119	0.7	+0.7
Independent	James Drabsch	77	0.4	−7.3
Total formal votes		18,244	98.3	+0.2
Informal votes		323	1.7	−0.2
Turnout		18,567	84.7	−3.8
Two-party-preferred result
National	Russ Hinze	11,788	64.6	+5.3
Labor	Philip Button	6,456	35.4	−5.3
National hold		Swing	+5.3	

=== Southport ===
1980 Queensland state election: Southport
Party	Candidate	Votes	%	±%
Liberal	Peter White	6,376	38.5	+4.4
National	Doug Jennings	5,570	33.7	−2.5
Labor	Ian Rogers	4,195	25.4	−3.2
Progress	Kevin Chaffey	219	1.3	+1.3
Independent	Peter Courtney	112	0.7	+0.7
Independent	Grace Plunkett	67	0.4	+0.4
Total formal votes		16,539	97.3	−1.0
Informal votes		461	2.7	+1.0
Turnout		17,000	85.5	−3.7
Two-candidate-preferred result
National	Doug Jennings	8,623	52.1	+11.9
Liberal	Peter White	7,916	47.9	−11.9
National gain from Liberal		Swing	+11.9	

=== Stafford ===
1980 Queensland state election: Stafford
Party	Candidate	Votes	%	±%
Liberal	Terry Gygar	7,584	50.7	+0.1
Labor	Brian Mellifont	7,385	49.3	−0.1
Total formal votes		14,969	98.0	−0.8
Informal votes		311	2.0	+0.8
Turnout		15,280	90.5	−2.4
Liberal hold		Swing	+0.1	

=== Surfers Paradise ===
1980 Queensland state election: Surfers Paradise
Party	Candidate	Votes	%	±%
National	Rob Borbidge	7,459	41.9	+3.2
Liberal	Bruce Bishop	5,842	32.8	+6.9
Labor	Khalil Salem	3,725	20.9	−1.1
Independent	Eileen Peters	768	4.3	+4.3
Total formal votes		17,794	98.3	+0.6
Informal votes		304	1.7	−0.6
Turnout		18,098	84.7	−2.9
Two-candidate-preferred result
National	Rob Borbidge	10,305	57.9	+13.6
Liberal	Bruce Bishop	7,489	42.1	−13.6
National gain from Liberal		Swing	+13.6	

=== Toowong ===
1980 Queensland state election: Toowong
Party	Candidate	Votes	%	±%
Liberal	Ian Prentice	5,024	34.2	−13.2
Labor	Gailene Harrison	4,030	27.4	−3.0
National	Peter Forrest	3,767	25.6	+25.6
Democrats	Michael West	1,882	12.8	−5.8
Total formal votes		14,703	98.9	0.0
Informal votes		159	1.1	0.0
Turnout		14,862	85.4	−4.0
Two-party-preferred result
Liberal	Ian Prentice	9,279	63.1	+4.4
Labor	Gailene Harrison	5,424	36.9	−4.4
Liberal hold		Swing	+4.4	

=== Toowoomba North ===
1980 Queensland state election: Toowoomba North
Party	Candidate	Votes	%	±%
Liberal	John Lockwood	8,418	55.5	+8.0
Labor	Lindsay Jones	6,754	44.5	−0.9
Total formal votes		15,172	98.2	−0.6
Informal votes		280	1.8	+0.6
Turnout		15,452	89.8	−2.7
Liberal hold		Swing	+3.9	

=== Toowoomba South ===
1980 Queensland state election: Toowoomba South
Party	Candidate	Votes	%	±%
National	John Warner	7,097	45.0	−4.7
Labor	Ron Fraser	5,225	33.2	−7.7
Liberal	Colin Brimblecombe	2,860	18.1	+18.1
Democrats	Michael Clifford	578	3.7	−5.7
Total formal votes		15,760	98.6	−0.2
Informal votes		223	1.4	+0.2
Turnout		15,983	89.7	−1.9
Two-party-preferred result
National	John Warner	9,471	60.1	+5.2
Labor	Ron Fraser	6,289	39.9	−5.2
National hold		Swing	+5.2	

=== Townsville ===
1980 Queensland state election: Townsville
Party	Candidate	Votes	%	±%
Labor	Brian Dobinson	7,601	42.3	+1.7
Liberal	Norman Scott-Young	7,027	39.1	−11.9
National	Phillip Morton	3,329	18.5	+18.5
Total formal votes		17,957	98.5	−0.2
Informal votes		272	1.5	+0.2
Turnout		18,229	84.3	−1.8
Two-party-preferred result
Liberal	Norman Scott-Young	10,061	56.0	−0.3
Labor	Brian Dobinson	7,896	44.0	+0.3
Liberal hold		Swing	−0.3	

=== Townsville South ===
1980 Queensland state election: Townsville South
Party	Candidate	Votes	%	±%
Labor	Alex Wilson	6,667	48.9	−0.5
National	Alan Metcalfe	3,481	25.5	+25.5
Liberal	Hector Garrick	2,630	19.3	+19.3
Independent	Francis Rossiter	864	6.3	+6.3
Total formal votes		13,642	98.6	+0.7
Informal votes		192	1.4	−0.7
Turnout		13,834	86.3	−2.3
Two-party-preferred result
Labor	Alex Wilson	7,861	57.6	+6.6
National	Alan Metcalfe	5,781	42.4	−6.6
Labor hold		Swing	+6.6	

=== Townsville West ===
1980 Queensland state election: Townsville West
Party	Candidate	Votes	%	±%
Labor	Geoff Smith	7,356	52.5	+8.3
National	Max Hooper	6,321	45.1	+13.8
Communist	Frank Bishop	325	2.3	+2.3
Total formal votes		14,002	98.2	−0.7
Informal votes		263	1.8	+0.7
Turnout		14,265	86.9	−0.9
Two-party-preferred result
Labor	Geoff Smith	7,616	54.4	+5.3
National	Max Hooper	6,386	45.6	−5.3
Labor gain from National		Swing	+5.3	

=== Warrego ===
1980 Queensland state election: Warrego
Party	Candidate	Votes	%	±%
National	Neil Turner	3,826	52.6	+1.0
Labor	Michael Gordon	3,448	47.4	+1.1
Total formal votes		7,274	98.6	−0.6
Informal votes		104	1.4	+0.6
Turnout		7,378	88.9	−0.8
National hold		Swing	−0.4	

=== Warwick ===
1980 Queensland state election: Warwick
Party	Candidate	Votes	%	±%
National	Des Booth	6,199	64.4	+11.5
Labor	Stephen Fazackerley	2,790	29.0	+0.5
Democrats	Maria Heyboer	632	6.6	+6.6
Total formal votes		9,621	99.0	+0.1
Informal votes		93	1.0	−0.1
Turnout		9,714	91.7	−1.5
Two-party-preferred result
National	Des Booth	6,509	67.7	−1.2
Labor	Stephen Fazackerley	3,112	32.3	+1.2
National hold		Swing	−1.2	

=== Wavell ===
1980 Queensland state election: Wavell
Party	Candidate	Votes	%	±%
Liberal	Brian Austin	7,960	56.9	+23.5
Labor	Jack Geran	6,020	43.1	−2.3
Total formal votes		13,980	98.1	−0.7
Informal votes		14,253	88.8	−3.9
Liberal hold		Swing	+4.1	

=== Whitsunday ===
1980 Queensland state election: Whitsunday
Party	Candidate	Votes	%	±%
National	Geoff Muntz	7,238	53.5	+0.8
Labor	Stanley Yardley	6,284	46.5	+5.0
Total formal votes		13,522	98.7	−0.1
Informal votes		178	1.3	+0.1
Turnout		13,700	89.7	−2.2
National hold		Swing	−2.0	

=== Windsor ===
1980 Queensland state election: Windsor
Party	Candidate	Votes	%	±%
Liberal	Bob Moore	6,685	47.5	−7.0
Labor	Frank Melit	6,323	45.0	−0.5
Independent	Louis McKenzie	1,055	7.5	+7.5
Total formal votes		14,063	98.5	+0.1
Informal votes		218	1.5	−0.1
Turnout		14,281	89.2	−0.5
Two-party-preferred result
Liberal	Bob Moore	7,213	51.3	−3.2
Labor	Frank Melit	6,850	48.7	+3.2
Liberal hold		Swing	−3.2	

=== Wolston ===
1980 Queensland state election: Wolston
Party	Candidate	Votes	%	±%
Labor	Bob Gibbs	8,702	59.4	+1.2
Liberal	Bob Harper	3,485	23.8	−1.0
National	Roy Buchanan	2,460	16.8	−0.2
Total formal votes		14,647	97.9	+0.2
Informal votes		320	2.1	−0.2
Turnout		14,967	87.8	−3.3
Two-party-preferred result
Labor	Bob Gibbs	8,965	61.2	+0.6
Liberal	Bob Harper	5,682	38.8	−0.6
Labor hold		Swing	+0.6	

=== Woodridge ===
1980 Queensland state election: Woodridge
Party	Candidate	Votes	%	±%
Labor	Bill D'Arcy	8,531	46.3	−3.1
Liberal	Douglas Dagleish	6,449	35.0	+2.1
Democrats	Robert Webb	1,404	7.6	+7.6
Independent	Anne Glew	921	5.0	+5.0
Independent	Jack Davis	737	4.0	+4.0
Independent	Robert Bartlett	378	2.1	+2.1
Total formal votes		18,420	97.9	−0.2
Informal votes		397	2.1	+0.2
Turnout		18,817	86.6	−4.0
Two-party-preferred result
Labor	Bill D'Arcy	10,395	56.4	+2.3
Liberal	Douglas Dagleish	8,025	43.6	−2.3
Labor hold		Swing	+2.3	

=== Wynnum ===
1980 Queensland state election: Wynnum
Party	Candidate	Votes	%	±%
Labor	Eric Shaw	8,068	52.4	+3.6
National	Merven Hoppner	4,556	29.6	−7.0
Liberal	Vanessa Gregory	2,781	18.1	+10.8
Total formal votes		15,405	98.8	+0.1
Informal votes		184	1.2	−0.1
Turnout		15,589	90.0	−2.4
Two-party-preferred result
Labor	Eric Shaw	8,833	57.3	+3.2
National	Merven Hoppner	6,572	42.7	−3.2
Labor hold		Swing	+3.2	

=== Yeronga ===
1980 Queensland state election: Yeronga
Party	Candidate	Votes	%	±%
Liberal	Norm Lee	8,283	57.0	+2.3
Labor	Kitchener Farrell	6,237	43.0	+2.5
Total formal votes		14,520	98.0	−0.5
Informal votes		300	2.0	+0.5
Turnout		14,820	90.4	−1.8
Liberal hold		Swing	−1.1	

== See also ==
- 1980 Queensland state election
- Members of the Queensland Legislative Assembly, 1980-1983
