= Candidates of the 1983 Queensland state election =

The 1983 Queensland state election was held on 22 October 1983.

== Retiring Members ==
=== Labor ===
- Jim Blake MLA (Bundaberg)
- Brendan Hansen MLA (Maryborough)
- Ray Jones MLA (Cairns)

=== National ===
- Val Bird MLA (Burdekin)
- Des Frawley MLA (Caboolture)
- Selwyn Muller MLA (Fassifern)
- Vic Sullivan MLA (Condamine)
- Ken Tomkins MLA (Roma)

=== Liberal ===
- Llewellyn Edwards MLA (Ipswich)

== Candidates ==
Sitting members at the time of the election are shown in bold text.

Electorate	Held by	Labor candidate	National candidate	Liberal candidate	Other candidates
Albert	National	Walter Ehrich	**Ivan Gibbs**		
Archerfield	Labor	**Kevin Hooper**	Douglas Jackson		
Ashgrove	Liberal	Tom Veivers	Clive Appleby	**John Greenwood**	Michael West (Dem)
Aspley	Liberal	Daniel O'Connell	Brian Cahill	**Beryce Nelson**	
Auburn	National	Raymond Barker	**Neville Harper**		
Balonne	National	Graham Staerk	**Don Neal**		
Barambah	National	Fred Hoberg	**Joh Bjelke-Petersen**		
Barron River	National	Wendy Lilja	**Martin Tenni**		
Brisbane Central	Labor	**Brian Davis**		Rodney Daniel	
Bulimba	Labor	**Ron McLean**	Peter Stone	Isabel Daniel	
Bundaberg	Labor	Clem Campbell	Des Barritt		Alex Warren (Dem)
Burdekin	National	Peter Rehbein	Mark Stoneman	Ian Macdonald	Keven Proberts (Ind)
Burnett	National	Graham Betts	**Claude Wharton**		
Caboolture	National	Robert Wilson	Bill Newton	Graeme Selby	John Bergin (Ind)
Cairns	Labor	Keith De Lacy	Christian Bolton	Lionel Van Dorssen	
Callide	National	Alan Morris	Alan Stevenson		**Lindsay Hartwig** (Ind)
Carnarvon	National	Deanna Selle	**Peter McKechnie**		
Chatsworth	Labor	**Terry Mackenroth**		David Cahalan	
Condamine	National	Barry Hicks	Brian Littleproud		Margaret Wuth (Ind)
Cook	Labor	**Bob Scott**	Patrick Killoran; James Wilkinson		
Cooroora	National	Gordon Nuttall	**Gordon Simpson**		Stanley Carlile (Ind); T. Roth (Dem)
Cunningham	National	Warren Keats	**Tony Elliott**		
Everton	Labor	**Glen Milliner**	Donald Munro	Gregory Smith	
Fassifern	National	Brian Milner	Kev Lingard	Noel Clarke	
Flinders	National	Beverley Lauder	**Bob Katter**		Peter Black (Ind)
Greenslopes	Liberal	Robert Lauchland	Leisha Harvey	**Bill Hewitt**	
Gregory	National	Robert McPhee	**Bill Glasson**		
Gympie	National	Thomas Barnett	**Len Stephan**		
Hinchinbrook	National	Steve Bredhauer	**Ted Row**	William Mason	
Ipswich	Liberal	David Hamill	William Hayes	Graham Cruickshank	Victor Robb (Ind)
Ipswich West	Labor	**David Underwood**	John Roberts	Christopher Tankey	Geoffrey Snell (Ind)
Isis	National	Joseph Endres	**Lin Powell**		
Ithaca	Liberal	Ross MacLeod		**Col Miller**	
Kurilpa	Liberal	Anne Warner	Patricia Kelly	**Sam Doumany**	Alvan Hawkes (Prog); John Nobody (Ind)
Landsborough	National	Peter Byrne; Gary Flanigan	**Mike Ahern**		Donald Culley (Ind); Dennis Marshall (Prog); Ken Neil (Ind)
Lockyer	National	Sheila Forknall	**Tony FitzGerald**	Tony Bourke	
Lytton	Labor	**Tom Burns**		Moyra Bidstrup	
Mackay	Labor	**Ed Casey**	John Comerford		
Mansfield	Liberal	Norma Jones	**Bill Kaus**	Gregory Goebel	Desmond McKay (Prog)
Maryborough	Labor	Peter Nightingale	Gilbert Alison	Rodney Bailey	
Merthyr	Liberal	Leon Pearce	William Owen	**Don Lane**	Gary Waddell (Ind)
Mirani	National	Jeffrey Gascoyne	**Jim Randell**		
Mount Coot-tha	Liberal	Denis Pacey	Cedric Dowdle	**Bill Lickiss**	David Dalgarno (Dem)
Mount Gravatt	Liberal	Steve Tharendu	Ian Henderson	**Guelfi Scassola**	
Mount Isa	National	Bill Price	**Angelo Bertoni**		Desmond Welk (Ind)
Mourilyan	Labor	**Bill Eaton**	Vicky Kippin		Ronald Nielsen (Ind)
Mulgrave	National	George Pervan	**Max Menzel**		Leslie Webber (Ind)
Murrumba	Labor	**Joe Kruger**	Allan Male	Roger Maguire	
Nudgee	Labor	**Ken Vaughan**		Peter Hull	
Nundah	Liberal	Owen Gazzard		**William Knox**	
Peak Downs	National	Lindsay Shepherd	**Vince Lester**		Bruce Bragg (Ind)
Pine Rivers	Liberal	John Kennedy	Yvonne Chapman	**Rob Akers**	
Port Curtis	Labor	**Bill Prest**	Michael Crowley		Patricia Cathcart (Ind); Rata Pugh (CA)
Redcliffe	Liberal	Peter Houston		**Terry White**	
Redlands	National	Andrew Mellis	**John Goleby**	Ken Eastwell	Kath Walker (Dem)
Rockhampton	Labor	**Keith Wright**	Charles Doblo	Alan Agnew	Brian Dillon (Ind)
Rockhampton North	Labor	**Les Yewdale**	Patrick Maloney	Beverley Reynolds	
Roma	National	August Johanson	Russell Cooper	Thomas Warren	Clement O'Connor (Dem)
Salisbury	Liberal	Wayne Goss	Gavan Duffy	**Rosemary Kyburz**	
Sandgate	Labor	**Nev Warburton**	Ian Armstrong	Ian Parminter	
Sherwood	Liberal	John Court	Christopher Stephens	**Angus Innes**	Cedric Holland (Ind)
Somerset	National	Ron Hazelden	**Bill Gunn**	Clive Herrald	
South Brisbane	Labor	**Jim Fouras**	Malcolm Ellis	Rodney Miller	Ivan Ivanoff (SPA)
South Coast	National	Noel Elliott	**Russ Hinze**	Ian Foyster	
Southport	National	Ian Rogers	**Doug Jennings**	Carol McLaughlin	
Stafford	Liberal	Denis Murphy	Patrick Blake	**Terry Gygar**	
Surfers Paradise	National	Khalil Salem	**Rob Borbidge**	Theodore Greenland	
Toowong	Liberal	Nigel Pennington	Earle Bailey	**Ian Prentice**	
Toowoomba North	Liberal	Peter Wood	Sandy McPhie	**John Lockwood**	
Toowoomba South	National	Kim McCasker	**John Warner**	Neil O'Sullivan	
Townsville	Liberal	Ken McElligott	Peter Arnold	**Norman Scott-Young**	Daniel Gleeson (Ind)
Townsville South	Labor	**Alex Wilson**	Dickway Goon-Chew	Theo Theofanes	
Townsville West	Labor	**Geoff Smith**	Clifford Donohue	Leslie Tyrell	Ron Aitken (Ind)
Warrego	National	David Land	**Neil Turner**		
Warwick	National	Mary Hill	**Des Booth**		
Wavell	Liberal	Christopher Begley		**Brian Austin**	
Whitsunday	National	Kevin Poschelk	**Geoff Muntz**		
Windsor	Liberal	Pat Comben	**Bob Moore**	Ann Garms	
Wolston	Labor	**Bob Gibbs**		Bob Harper	
Woodridge	Labor	**Bill D'Arcy**	Selma Elson	Derek Richards	Ray Ferguson (SPA); Katherine Gillick (SLL); Michael van de Velde (Dem)
Wynnum	Labor	**Eric Shaw**	Michael Podagiel	Audrey Dickie	
Yeronga	Liberal	Kitchener Farrell		**Norm Lee**	

== See also ==
- 1983 Queensland state election
- Members of the Queensland Legislative Assembly, 1980–1983
- Members of the Queensland Legislative Assembly, 1983–1986
- List of political parties in Australia
