= David Dunworth =

Australian politician

Member of the Queensland Legislative Assembly for Sherwood
- In office 28 July 1990 – 19 September 1992
- Preceded by: Angus Innes
- Succeeded by: Seat abolished

Personal details
- Born: David Anthony Dunworth; 29 August 1946 (age 80) Brisbane, Queensland, Australia
- Party: Liberal Party
- Spouse: Maris Anne McShane
- Education: University of Queensland
- Occupation: Commonwealth public servant, Real estate agent, Company director

Rugby union career
- Position: prop
International career
Years	Team	Apps	(Points)
1971–76	Wallabies	5	(0)

David Anthony Dunworth (born 29 August 1946) was a rugby union player who represented Australia.

Dunworth, a prop, was born in Brisbane, Queensland and claimed a total of 5 international rugby caps for Australia.

Dunworth was a Liberal member of the Legislative Assembly of Queensland from 1990 to 1992, representing the electorate of Sherwood from the 1990 by-election to 1992. He contested the electorate of Mount Ommaney at the 1992 election but was defeated.

Parliament of Queensland
Preceded by Angus Innes	Member for Sherwood; 1990–1992	Abolished
