= Queensland National Party =

Queensland National Party National Party of Australia – Queensland
- Abbreviation: NPA-Q
- Leader: Full list
- Founded: 1915
- Dissolved: 26 July 2008
- Merger of: National; Northern Country
- Merged into: Liberal National (Note: Merged into a single party with the Queensland division of the Liberal Party on 26 July 2008; 18 years ago.)
- Headquarters: 37 Merivale Street, South Brisbane, Queensland
- Youth wing: Young Nationals
- Membership (1989): 50,000 (Note: In 2008, as the party was preparing to vote on a merger with the state Liberal Party, the membership was at 10,000.)
- Ideology: Conservatism; Protectionism; Agrarianism; Economic liberalism; 1970s–1980s: Right-wing populism; Social conservatism
- Political position: Centre-right to right-wing; Factions: Far-right
- National affiliation: Federal Nationals (Note: In the party's entire history, there have been few coalition agreements. However, the formal “Coalition” agreement made between the predecessors of the Liberal and National parties has been consistent since the 1940s.)
- Colours: Green
- Legislative Assembly: 49 / 89 (1986–1989)

Website
- qld.nationals.org.au

The National Party of Australia – Queensland (NPA-Q), commonly known as the Queensland Nationals, National Party of Queensland or simply the Nationals, was the Queensland branch of the National Party of Australia (NPA) until 2008. Prior to 1974, it was known as the Country Party. The party was disestablished in 2008, when it merged with the Queensland division of the Liberal Party of Australia to form the Liberal National Party of Queensland (LNP).

Formed in 1915 by the Queensland Farmers' Union (QFU) and serving as the state branch of the National Party of Australia, it initially sought to represent the interests of the farmers but over time became a more general conservative political party in the state, leading to much debate about relations with other conservative parties and a series of mergers that were soon undone.

From 1924 onward, it was the senior partner in the centre-right coalition with the state Liberal Party and its predecessors, in a reversal of the normal situation at the federal level and in the rest of Australia. The Country-Liberal Coalition won power in 1957 and governed until the Liberals broke away in 1983; the Nationals continued to govern in their own right until defeat in 1989.

The party formed another Coalition with the Liberals that took power in 1996 but was defeated in 1998. After a further decade in opposition, in 2008, the two parties merged to form the Liberal National Party of Queensland (LNP).

== History ==
Throughout their history the Nationals were repeatedly beset by the question of whether or not to merge with other conservative political forces in the state to provide a unified political alternative to the Labor Party or whether it was more important to maintain a distinct voice for the countryside. A third approach, practiced most prominently in the 1970s and 1980s, was to seek to expand the party's appeal to urban Queensland and ultimately make the party the dominant force on the right.

=== Origins ===
Prior to the First World War a series of efforts were made to give political representation to rural interests but these were slow and limited in scope, with most effort focused on existing parties. Then in the 1915 election dissatisfaction with the Liberal government of Digby Denham led to the Queensland Farmers' Union running its own candidates, five of whom were elected. John Appel, a former minister who had broken with Denham, became the leader of what was now a distinct separate Country Party grouping in the Legislative Assembly of Queensland. The party drew its main strength from farmers in the east of the state and had limited success with graziers in the west. Although the United Cane Growers' Association and then the United Graziers' Association would join with the QFU by 1919 to form the Primary Producers' Union, the party's electoral base would be geographically constrained for the next four decades.

Independence was initially short-lived. Labor had won power at the 1915 election and the opposition forces soon looked to ally. The National Political Council was formed and the Liberals and Country Party came together as the National Party to fight the 1918 election; however the union was short-lived and in July 1920 the Nationalists split with the majority of MLAs reforming a separate Country Party led by William Vowles. A third party, the Northern Country Party emerged as a regional split with the Nationalists. The three parties co-operated in the 1920 state election but were unable to dislodge Labor. The same year saw the formation of the federal Country Party. In 1921 James Hunter won the Division of Maranoa in a by-election, giving the Country Party their first federal member in Queensland.

Over the next few years the Country Party absorbed the Northern Country Party, though its elected members joined with the rump of the National Party who now organised in the state as the Queensland United Party. The United Party won more seats than the Country Party at the 1923 state election, but in subsequent elections fought as separate parties the Country/National Party would consistently win more seats than the other major conservative party.

=== Repeated fusion ===
Arthur Edward Moore became the new leader of the Country Party in September 1923 and then the following April was elected leader of a joint opposition as the Country and United parties sought greater unity. In May 1925 the two parties' organisations merged as the Country Progressive Party but four United MLAs initially sought to revive as the Nationalist Party until December that year when they too joined in what was now named the Country and Progressive National Party. Moore would retain the leadership throughout the existence of the CPNP. The CPNP won power at the 1929 state election but the Moore Ministry would only last one term amidst the challenges of the Great Depression, being defeated in 1932. Following a second defeat in 1935, the CPNP split into separate Country Party and United Australia Party branches.

Ted Maher led the party to further defeats in 1938 and 1941. Then in April of the latter year, newly elected federal Country Party leader Arthur Fadden, MP for the Queensland Division of Darling Downs, sought to merge the Country and United Australia parties. Only in Queensland did this yield much success with the two parliamentary parties forming the Country-National Organisation. (Note: Sometimes called the "Country-National Party" in later sources, e.g. Cilento, Sir Raphael (1959). Triumph in the Tropics: An Historical Sketch of Queensland. Smith & Paterson. p. 417., but contemporary sources show the body used "Organisation".) Frank Nicklin of the Country side became the new leader of the party. However the merger was resisted both by some Country Party MLAs and by the extra-parliamentary organisation, with the western division of the Queensland Country Party continuing to operate as a separate body. Former federal MP James Hunter worked hard for demerger, an aim achieved by 1944. A new party constitution allowed co-operation but forbade merger with other parties. Nicklin continued as the leader of the separate Country Party which co-operated with the Queensland People's Party, formed by John Beals Chandler out of the UAP remnants, which would later be renamed the Liberal Party of Australia (Queensland Division) in 1949.

A pattern was set in the 1944 state election whereby the Country Party secured fewer votes but more seats than the People's Party; this pattern would continue into the 1970s. Nicklin would continue to lead the party to defeat over five successive elections, but there seemed little prospect of defeating Labor, especially after the introduction of a malapportionment that significantly varied the size of electorates in different zones of the state.

=== Into government ===
In 1957 the Labor Party in Queensland was engulfed in the split that had been growing in the party across Australia over the influence of communism. The sitting Premier Vince Gair was expelled from the party and led a breakaway Queensland Labor Party that sought to retain office. Gair sought to retain office helming a minority government, and sought backing from the Country Party. Nicklin initially considered offering support to Gair, but then declined when Fadden–by then, de facto federal Deputy Prime Minister–argued there was the opportunity for the Country Party to win power in its own right. When the state parliament resumed sitting, the rump Labor caucus moved to block supply. Nicklin instructed the Coalition to vote against the government as well, bringing it down. At the 1957 state election, the Country-Liberal Coalition won power after a quarter of a century. Due to a large number of three-cornered contests (every QLP incumbent faced a Labor challenger, and vice versa), the Coalition won a solid majority, winning 42 seats against only 31 for the two Labor factions combined.

Nicklin had a strong working relationship with Liberal leader Kenneth Morris which would underpin the Coalition's initial years in government, although Nicklin privately found Morris trying at times. In government the two parties sought to tweak the electoral system to their advantage, with the Country Party securing the continuation of the zonal system that would keep them as the larger party despite some Liberal opposition. Later in 1962 the Liberals secured the reintroduction of preferential voting which would allow the non-Labor vote to combine but also in the long term allowed for the two Coalition parties to contest seats against one another, while preferencing each other ahead of Labor. The Nicklin Ministry governed over what has been described as "the most tranquil decade of [Queensland's] recent political history", but within the parties tensions were growing over the balance of the Coalition. Brisbane's growth was rapidly spilling onto the Redcliffe Peninsula, and the Gold Coast was also seeing growing urbanisation. Additionally, the Liberals were setting up new branches in traditional Country Party areas. This put pressure on the traditional allocation of seats between the two partners. The 1966 state election saw the Country and Liberal parties stand against each other in eight seats, but none changed between the Coalition partners. In general Nicklin took a relaxed approach to Coalition arrangements that sought to avoid direct confrontation, and this kept the parties together without destructive internal confrontation. Suffering ill health, Nicklin retired in early 1968. He was succeeded by Jack Pizzey, who had served as deputy leader of the party since 1957. However barely half a year later Pizzey died of a heart attack.

=== The Joh Bjelke-Petersen years (1968–1987) ===
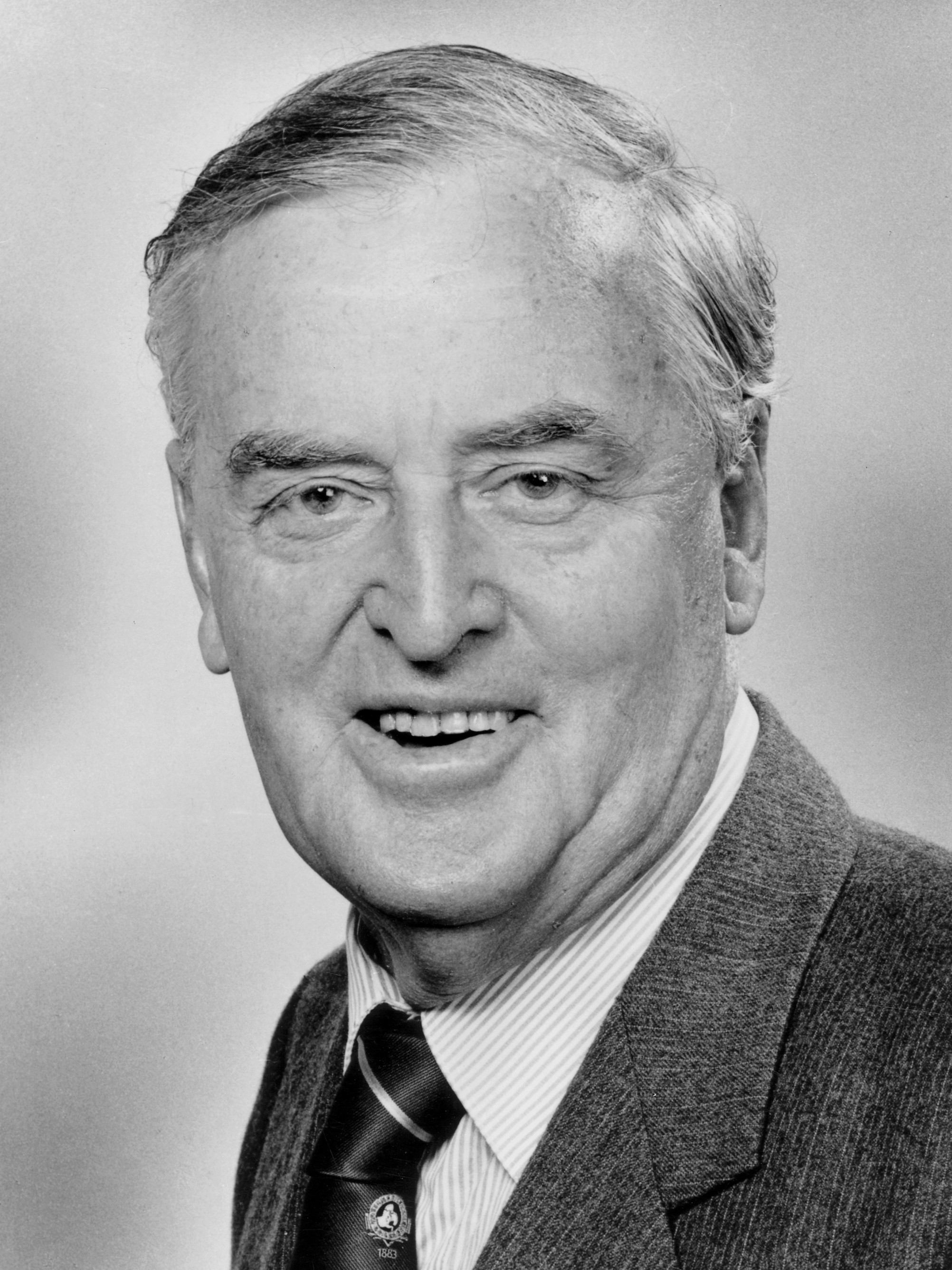
Joh Bjelke-Petersen was the longest-serving premier of Queensland, holding office from 1968 to 1987

Joh Bjelke-Petersen, the sitting deputy leader, was elected leader of the party. Over the next two decades he would dominate the party, government and state, as well as making multiple interventions into federal politics. In contrast to the Nicklin years, Bjelke-Petersen would also preside over a deterioration in relations between the two coalition parties. The first conflict came immediately. Liberal leader Gordon Chalk had been appointed as interim Premier immediately upon Pizzey's death, pending the Country Party choosing a new leader. However, Chalk argued to retain the post, even though the Liberals had seven fewer seats than the Country Party. Bjelke-Petersen threatened to break up the Coalition unless Chalk backed down, and prevailed.

As Premier, Bjelke-Petersen oversaw rapid economic growth and development in the state, including greater urbanisation. His government pursued uncompromising conservatism, taking an especially heavy-handed line against trade unions and demonstrators, leading to accusations that Queensland had become a banana republic. He especially advocated the notion of Queensland exceptionalism, yielding ever greater electoral success. The Country Party continued to benefit from the electoral malapportionment which continued to be modified throughout their time in government. Nicknamed the "Bjelkemander", it continued to strengthen the Coalition against Labor, reinforcing the conservatives' hold on power. At the same time, it also strengthened the Country Party against the Liberals. However the changing nature of Queensland meant that the rural population was in decline while provincial cities were growing, placing the Country Party's position under greater threat. An early conflict came in a by-election for the Gold Coast seat of Albert. The seat had been in Country Party hands since 1936, but over the 1960s saw increased electoral pressure from first independents and then the Liberals. The by-election saw the Country Party vote collapse and the Liberals take the seat. Together with accusations surrounding his financial affairs this placed Bjelke-Petersen under immense pressure and he only narrowly survived a leadership challenge.

Although the 1969 and 1972 state elections saw little change, the next few years would be transformative for the party and its fortunes. The 1972 federal election saw Labor win power nationally for the first time in 23 years under Gough Whitlam. Bjelke-Petersen soon set himself up as one of the most prominent and implacable foes of the Whitlam government, leading to the Prime Minister calling the Premier "a Bible-bashing bastard... a paranoic, a bigot and fanatical." The Country Party sought greater unity with other opposition groups. It even explored a merger with the state Democratic Labor Party (formerly the QLP), for which the Country Party modified its constitution to allow the possibility. In April 1974 as part of the attempt to expand its appeal into urban areas the party changed its name to the National Party, eight years before the federal party adopted that name. Later that year Bjelke-Petersen called an early election, attacking the federal Labor government. The result saw Labor routed, with their leader Perc Tucker losing his own seat. The party also won its first seat in Brisbane as Bill Lamond gained the electoral district of Wynnum. Subsequently, at the 1977 state election the Nationals outpolled the Liberals for the first time, a position they would maintain for the next twenty years. The party responded to its strengthened position by consolidating its position in the cabinet at the expense of its partner. In parliament the Nationals pushed a number of policies and tactics, overcoming opposition from the Liberal leadership on matters ranging from the abolition of death duties to breaking the convention on mid-term federal Senate replacements by filling a Labor vacancy with Albert Field, a nominal Labor member hostile to Whitlam, which contributed to the latter's dismissal. Bjelke-Petersen did not just hamper Labor federal governments though, with a breakdown in relations with the Liberals leading to the two parties running competing Senate tickets at the 1980 federal election, costing the Coalition a seat and thus its majority.

The Nationals continued to dominate over the Liberals, who suffered increasing division over tactics between the parliamentary leadership, the backbenchers and the extra-parliamentary party. Chalk had retired in 1976, succeeded by William Knox who lasted just over two years before being replaced by Llewellyn Edwards. However, despite demands for a stronger Liberal approach, the leadership felt unable to deliver it. At the 1980 state election the Nationals gained further seats at the expense of the Liberals, with tensions building further. A growing group of Liberal critics dubbed the "Ginger Group" increasingly challenged both their own leadership and the Nationals. In 1982 Angus Innes challenged Edwards for the leadership, despite Bjelke-Petersen declaring he would prefer a minority government to a coalition with an Innes-led Liberal Party, and only narrowly lost by 12:10. Matters boiled over the following year when Terry White, the Liberal Minister for Welfare Services, voted against the government line in a debate on creating a public accounts committee to monitor public spending. This was in line with Liberal policy but against the government position, although White disputed the latter point. White was sacked from the government and successfully challenged Edwards for the leadership, with Innes elected as deputy. Bjelke-Petersen refused to appoint White as Deputy Premier and the Coalition was dissolved. The Nationals governed as a minority for a few months until the 1983 state election at which they won 41 out of the 82 seats available, including several in Brisbane, while the Liberals were reduced to a mere eight. This left the Nationals one seat short of an outright majority. Soon two Liberals, Brian Austin and Don Lane, switched to the Nationals, allowing Bjelke-Petersen to govern in his own right.

The National party in the Green at the 1986 Queensland state election, at its peak

Following further modification to the "Bjelkemander", the party went on to win an outright majority at the 1986 state election; it was to be the party's best ever election result and the only time in the whole of Australia that the Nationals have won majority government in their own right. Federally another Labor government had been elected in 1983 and Bjelke-Petersen turned his fire not only on Prime Minister Bob Hawke and the programme of the Hawke government but also on the federal opposition led by John Howard and Ian Sinclair. A "Joh for PM", later "Joh for Canberra", campaign began in 1987, but it ultimately fizzled out with Bjelke-Petersen not standing in the 1987 federal election. Nevertheless, the campaign succeeded in temporarily breaking up the federal Coalition. Due to the ensuing number of three-cornered contests, Labor won a third term, while the Nationals lost seats in Queensland. Amidst all this, accusations of corruption in the Queensland Police led to an inquiry being commissioned in Bjelke-Petersen's absence. The Fitzgerald Inquiry led to significant political damage within the party, undermining Bjelke-Petersen's authority, The party began to turn on him, with ministers going as far to openly oppose him at cabinet meetings. By October, Belle-Petersen was forced to announce he would retire from politics the following year. However, a month later, the Nationals deposed Bjelke-Petersen in a party-room coup, replacing him with Mike Ahern. Bjelke-Petersen clung to the premiership for a few more days before bowing to the inevitable and handing power to Ahern.

=== Collapse and slow recovery (1987-2001) ===
Ahern served as Premier for nearly two years, during which time the party continued to be riven by infighting between supporters and opponents of Bjelke-Petersen and by continued revelations from the Fitzgerald Inquiry. He tried to implement a more consultative approach to governing, but this was not enough to stop the party's standing in the polls from tailing off. The Nationals entered 1989 facing a statutory general election later that year, and trailing badly in the polls. A Newspoll released shortly after the release of the Fitzgerald Inquiry showed the Nationals on only 22 percent support, the lowest figure for a state government in Australia at the time. The Nationals would have been decimated had this been repeated at a general election.

In hopes of buying more time, Russell Cooper, a National Party traditionalist, successfully challenged Ahern for the leadership. However, Cooper was unable to stem the growing anger at the revelations about the massive corruption in the Bjelke-Petersen government. Cooper waited as long as he could, finally calling an election for 2 December. At that election, the Nationals were thrown from office on a massive 24-seat swing, ending 32 years in power. Much of that swing came due to Brisbane swinging hard to Labor; all but five of the capital's seats fell to Labor. At the time, it was the worst defeat of a sitting government in Queensland history.

The new Labor government of Wayne Goss dismantled the "Bjelkemander"; the ensuing "one vote one value" reforms resulted in Brisbane electing nearly half of the legislature. Furthermore, the voting system was changed from full preferencing to optional preferencing, making it harder for the Nationals and Liberals to contest the same seats without risking loss to Labor. As a result, the Nationals faced a much tougher route back into government and the next two decades would see renewed strong debate over relations with the Liberals, with the latter party initially instead seeking to achieve senior status and steadily replacing the Nationals as the main conservative party on the Sunshine Coast and then the Gold Coast. Cooper stood down as leader in 1991 to be succeeded by Rob Borbidge, but despite the major changes to the electoral distribution the outcome of the 1992 election was much the same as 1989. By late 1992, the two parties had reformed the Coalition and presented a united front in the 1995 state election. The initial results saw Labor retain power with a one-seat majority, but this was overturned when the result in one seat was declared void and the Liberals won the subsequent by-election. With the support of independent Liz Cunningham, Borbidge became premier.

During Borbidge's premiership the party faced a strong challenge from the rise of Pauline Hanson's One Nation party that challenged on issues such as multiculturalism, gun ownership and native title which were well received in the Nationals' heartland of rural and regional Queensland. The Nationals faced a sharp backlash against the introduction of gun control laws after the Port Arthur massacre. At the 1998 election the Coalition lost much support to One Nation. The election also saw the Nationals poll fewer votes than the Liberals for the first time in over a quarter of a century despite winning more seats, an outcome that would recur for the next decade. Borbidge held out hope of staying in office after leakage of Coalition preferences delivered seven seats to One Nation that would have otherwise gone to Labor, leaving Labor one seat short of a majority. However, this depended on the support of both independents in the chamber, Cunningham and newly elected Peter Wellington. After some consideration, Wellington threw his support to Labor, ending what proved to be the last National-led government in Queensland.

Borbidge continued to lead the Nationals, but was unable to get the better of Beattie even after One Nation imploded and an inquiry ended the careers of several Labor MPs. The Coalition went into the 2001 state election in a state of near-paralysis. At that election, the Coalition suffered a small two-percent swing against it. However, its support in Brisbane all but melted, and it fell to only one seat in the capital. Borbidge retired from politics soon afterward.

=== Merger with the Liberals ===
Party logo prior to merger with the Liberal Party

The next seven years saw a series of leaders - Mike Horan, Lawrence Springborg (twice) and Jeff Seeney - come and go with little further advancement in the 2004 state election. In 2005 Lawrence Springborg and Liberal leader Bob Quinn publicly explored merging their parties to present a fully united alternative to Labor, but by 2006 the plan was declared dead and buried. The parties again lost the 2006 state election. Following federal defeat in the 2007 election and Springborg's return to the leadership the proposal was revived, and in July 2008 the parties agreed to merge as the Liberal National Party, with Springborg as the merged party's first leader. Although the new party was dominated by former Nationals, an agreement with its federal counterparts gave it full voting rights with the Liberals and observer status with the Nationals.

The merged party has so far lasted a decade and a half, but from time to time calls are made for the parties to demerge from both Liberals and Nationals due to the brand confusion it creates across the rest of Australia.

== Leaders ==
Leader	Date started	Date finished
John Appel	13 July 1915	1918
(Merged into the National Party)	1918	18 July 1920
William Vowles	18 July 1920	27 September 1923
Arthur Edward Moore	27 September 1923	12 May 1925
(Merged into the Country and Progressive National Party)	12 May 1925	5 March 1936
Arthur Edward Moore	5 March 1936	15 July 1936
Ted Maher	15 July 1936	27 April 1941
(Merged into the Country-National Organisation)	27 April 1941	1944
Frank Nicklin	1944	17 January 1968
Jack Pizzey	17 January 1968	31 July 1968
Joh Bjelke-Petersen	8 August 1968	26 November 1987
Mike Ahern	26 November 1987	25 September 1989
Russell Cooper	25 September 1989	9 December 1991
Rob Borbidge	10 December 1991	2 March 2001
Mike Horan	2 March 2001	4 February 2003
Lawrence Springborg	4 February 2003	18 September 2006
Jeff Seeney	14 September 2006	29 January 2008
Lawrence Springborg	21 January 2008	26 July 2008
(Merged into the Liberal National Party of Queensland)	26 July 2008	present

== Electoral performance ==
=== Legislative Assembly ===
Election	Leader	Votes	%	Seats	+/–	Position	Status
1915	John Appel	13,233	5.05	5 / 72	▲5	▲3rd	Crossbench
1918	Did not contest as separate entity						
1920	William Vowles	60,170	17.06	18 / 72	▲18	2nd	Opposition
1923	William Vowles	39,534	10.83	13 / 72	▼5	▼3rd	Opposition
1926	Did not contest as separate entity						
1929	Did not contest as separate entity						
1932	Did not contest as separate entity						
1935	Did not contest as separate entity						
1938	Ted Maher	120,469	22.65	13 / 62	▲13	▲2nd	Opposition
1941	Ted Maher	108,604	20.90	14 / 62	▲1	2nd	Opposition
1944	Frank Nicklin	88,608	17.60	12 / 62	▼2	2nd	Opposition
1947	Frank Nicklin	121,689	19.49	14 / 62	▲2	2nd	Opposition
1950	Frank Nicklin	121,199	19.25	20 / 75	▲6	2nd	Opposition
1953	Frank Nicklin	114,124	18.75	15 / 75	▼5	2nd	Opposition
1956	Frank Nicklin	126,183	19.27	16 / 75	▲1	2nd	Opposition
1957	Frank Nicklin	139,720	19.99	24 / 75	▲8	2nd	Coalition
1960	Frank Nicklin	144,865	18.80	26 / 78	▲2	2nd	Coalition
1963	Frank Nicklin	156,621	20.31	26 / 78	Steady	2nd	Coalition
1966	Frank Nicklin	154,081	19.28	27 / 78	▲1	2nd	Coalition
1969	Joh Bjelke-Petersen	179,125	21.02	26 / 78	▼1	2nd	Coalition
1972	Joh Bjelke-Petersen	181,404	20.00	26 / 82	Steady	2nd	Coalition
1974	Joh Bjelke-Petersen	291,088	27.88	39 / 82	▲13	▲1st	Coalition
1977	Joh Bjelke-Petersen	295,355	27.15	35 / 82	▼4	1st	Coalition
1980	Joh Bjelke-Petersen	328,262	27.94	35 / 82	Steady	1st	Coalition
1983	Joh Bjelke-Petersen	512,890	38.93	41 / 82	▲6	1st	Minority
1986	Joh Bjelke-Petersen	553,197	39.64	49 / 89	▲8	1st	Majority
1989	Russell Cooper	379,364	24.09	27 / 89	▼22	▼2nd	Opposition
1992	Rob Borbidge	413,772	23.71	26 / 89	▼1	2nd	Opposition
1995	Rob Borbidge	473,497	26.25	29 / 89	▲3	2nd	Opposition
1998	Rob Borbidge	293,839	15.17	23 / 89	▼6	2nd	Opposition
2001	Rob Borbidge	291,605	14.16	12 / 89	▼11	2nd	Opposition
2004	Lawrence Springborg	365,005	16.96	15 / 89	▲3	2nd	Opposition
2006	Lawrence Springborg	392,124	17.82	17 / 89	▲2	2nd	Opposition

== See also ==
- Category:National Party of Australia members of the Parliament of Queensland

== Bibliography ==
- Coaldrake, Peter (1989). Working the System: Government in Queensland. University of Queensland Press. ISBN 978-0702222306.
- Davey, Paul (2010). Ninety Not Out: The Nationals 1920-2010. UNSW Press. ISBN 978-1742231662.
- Hughes, Colin A. (1980). The Government of Queensland. University of Queensland Press. ISBN 978-0702215155.
