= 1983 Queensland state election =

- 22 October 1983

All 82 seats in the Legislative Assembly of Queensland 42 Assembly seats were needed for a majority
- Turnout: 91.69 (▲2.76 pp)
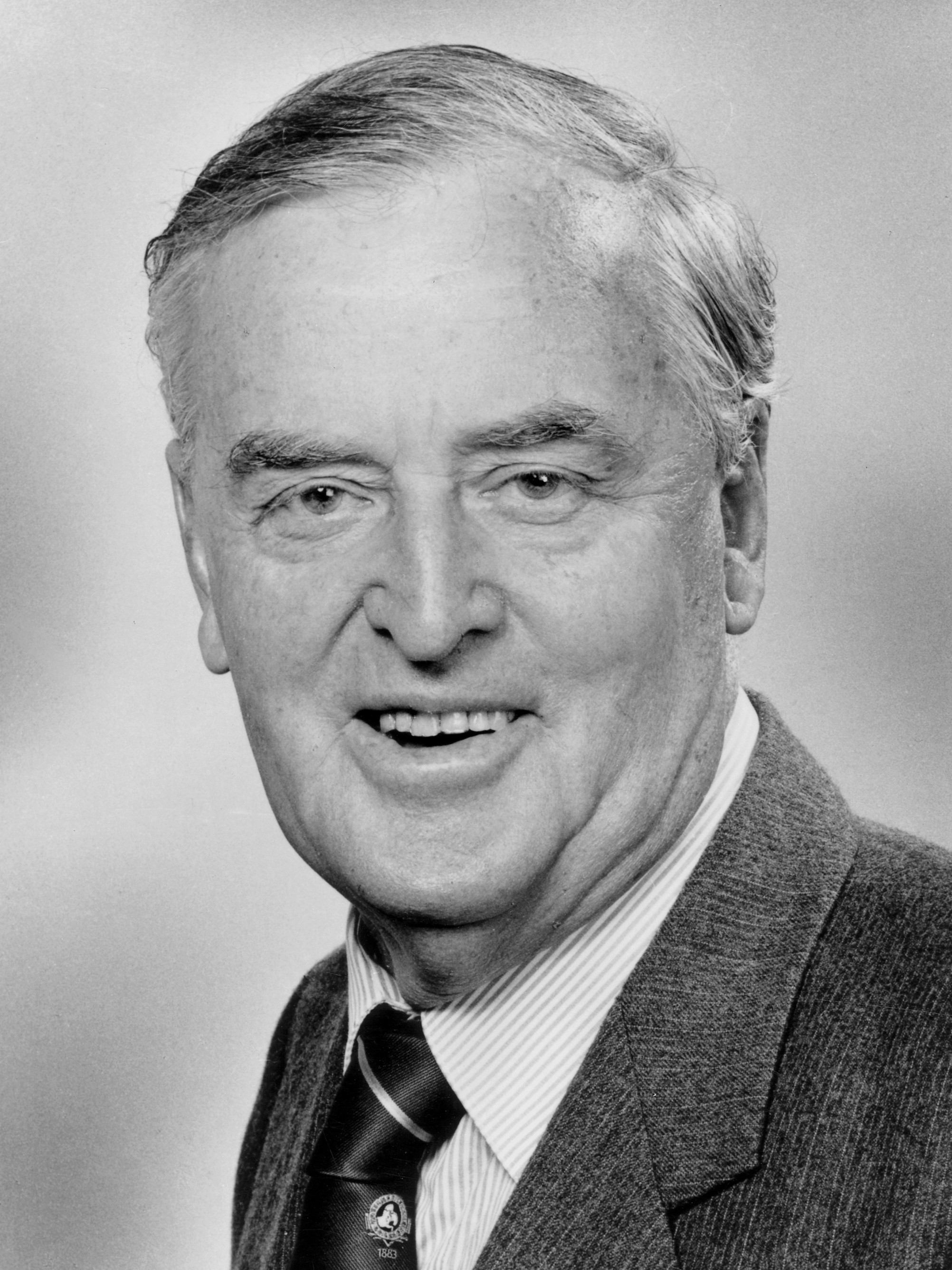

	First party	Second party	Third party
Leader	Joh Bjelke-Petersen	Keith Wright	Terry White
Party	National	Labor	Liberal
Leader since	8 August 1968	20 October 1982	9 August 1983
Leader's seat	Barambah	Rockhampton	Redcliffe
Last election	35 seats, 27.94%	25 seats, 41.49%	22 seats, 26.92%
Seats won	41	32	8
Seat change	▲6	▲7	▼14
Popular vote	512,890	579,363	196,072
Percentage	38.93%	43.98%	14.88%
Swing	▲10.99	▲2.49	▼12.04
TPP	53.4%	46.6%
- Winning margin by electorate.
Premier before election
Joh Bjelke-Petersen
National
Elected Premier
Joh Bjelke-Petersen
National

Elections were held in the Australian state of Queensland on 22 October 1983 to elect the 82 members of the state's Legislative Assembly.

The election resulted in a sixth consecutive term of office for the National Party under Joh Bjelke-Petersen. It was the tenth election win for the National Party in Queensland since it first came to office in 1957.

== Background ==
The election was triggered when a number of Liberal MLAs, including Welfare Services Minister Terry White, crossed the floor of the Parliament to support a Labor motion to create an Expenditure Review Committee. White was sacked from cabinet for supporting the motion. In response, he launched a party-room coup against Liberal leader and deputy premier Llewellyn Edwards and became Liberal leader with Angus Innes as his deputy.

In the normal course of events, White would have succeeded Edwards as deputy premier. However, White and Innes' progressive leanings didn't sit well with Bjelke-Petersen, and he refused to make White deputy premier. In response, White tore up the Coalition agreement and led the Liberals to the crossbench. However, Bjelke-Petersen prorogued Parliament ahead of the election, allowing him to govern for nine weeks without fear of being toppled on the floor of the legislature.

Labor, under the leadership of new leader Keith Wright, hoped to make use of the division between the conservative parties to make gains, while the Liberals hoped to win enough seats to force the Nationals back into Coalition under more favourable terms. The Nationals sought to gain enough seats to form a majority government in their own right. Indeed, Bjelke-Petersen directed his campaign mainly at right-leaning Liberal voters, suggesting that the alternative was a Labor government propped up by White's Liberals.

Clive Palmer served as the National Party's campaign director during the 1983 state election.

== Key dates ==
Date	Event
13 September 1983	The Parliament was dissolved.
13 September 1983	Writs were issued by the Governor to proceed with an election.
22 September 1983	Close of nominations.
22 October 1983	Polling day, between the hours of 8am and 6pm.
7 November 1983	The Bjelke-Petersen Ministry was reconstituted.
18 November 1983	The writ was returned and the results formally declared.
22 November 1983	Parliament resumed for business.

== Results ==
The Nationals were returned to office, one seat short of a majority. Labor also made gains, although not enough to challenge Bjelke-Petersen's continued dominance. The Liberals were decimated, falling from 22 seats to a rump of eight seats. Of the Liberals who crossed the floor, only White and Innes were reelected.

Queensland state election, 22 October 1983 Legislative Assembly << 1980–1986 >>
Enrolled voters	1,458,205				
Votes cast	1,336,985		Turnout	91.69%	+2.76%
Informal votes	19,591		Informal	1.47%	–0.04%
Summary of votes by party
Party	Primary votes	%	Swing	Seats	Change
Labor	579,363	43.98%	+2.49%	32	+7
Nationals	512,890	38.93%	+10.99%	41	+6
Liberal	196,072	14.88%	–12.04%	8	–14
Democrats	10,926	0.83%	–0.55%	0	±0
Progress	741	0.06%	–0.31%	0	±0
Independent	16,994	1.29%	–0.49%	1	+1
Others	408	0.03%	–0.09%	0	±0
Total	1,317,394			82	
Two-party-preferred
National/Liberal		53.4%			
Labor		46.6%			

Popular vote
Labor	43.98%
Nationals	38.93%
Liberal	14.88%
Democrats	0.83%
Progress	0.06%
Independents	1.29%
Others	0.03%

Seats
Nationals	50.00%
Labor	39.02%
Liberal	9.76%
Independents	1.22%

== Seats changing hands ==
Seat	Pre-1983			Swing	Post-1983		
Seat	Party	Member	Margin	Swing	Margin	Member	Party
Ashgrove	Liberal	John Greenwood	0.4	–2.0	1.6	Tom Veivers	Labor
Aspley	Liberal	Beryce Nelson	13.9	–24.4	10.4	Brian Cahill	National
Callide	National	Lindsay Hartwig	15.8	N/A	9.3	Lindsay Hartwig	Independent
Greenslopes	Liberal	Bill Hewitt	12.3	–16.6	4.3	Leisha Harvey	National
Ipswich	Liberal	Llewellyn Edwards	5.1	–14.8	9.7	David Hamill	Labor
Kurilpa	Liberal	Sam Doumany	2.7	–4.7	2.0	Anne Warner	Labor
Mansfield	Liberal	Bill Kaus	8.3	N/A	6.1	Bill Kaus	National
Maryborough	Labor	Brendan Hansen	0.6	–0.6	0.03	Gilbert Alison	National
Mount Gravatt	Liberal	Guelfi Scassola	15.7	–23.6	7.9	Ian Henderson	National
Mount Isa	National	Angelo Bertoni	0.9	–3.7	2.8	Bill Price	Labor
Pine Rivers	Liberal	Rob Akers	7.5	–7.9	0.4	Yvonne Chapman	National
Salisbury	Liberal	Rosemary Kyburz	2.3	–3.4	1.1	Wayne Goss	Labor
Stafford	Liberal	Terry Gygar	0.7	–0.8	0.1	Denis Murphy	Labor
Toowong	Liberal	Ian Prentice	13.1	–18.3	5.2	Earle Bailey	National
Toowoomba North	Liberal	John Lockwood	5.5	–9.1	3.6	Sandy McPhie	National
Townsville	Liberal	Norman Scott-Young	6.0	–7.5	1.5	Ken McElligott	Labor
Windsor	National	Bob Moore*	1.3	–3.4	2.1	Pat Comben	Labor

- Members listed in italics did not recontest their seats.
- Bob Moore was elected as a Liberal in the previous election, but changed to the National party in 1983.

== Post-election pendulum ==
National seats (41)
Marginal
Maryborough	Gilbert Alison	NAT	0.03%
Pine Rivers	Yvonne Chapman	NAT	0.4%
Barron River	Martin Tenni	NAT	3.2%
Caboolture	Bill Newton	NAT	3.3%
Toowoomba North	Sandy McPhie	NAT	3.6%
Redlands	John Goleby	NAT	4.0%
Greenslopes	Leisha Harvey	NAT	4.3%
Flinders	Bob Katter	NAT	5.2%
Toowong	Earle Bailey	NAT	5.2%
Fairly safe
Mansfield	Bill Kaus	NAT	6.1%
Hinchinbrook	Ted Row	NAT	6.2%
Albert	Ivan Gibbs	NAT	6.5%
Fassifern	Kev Lingard	NAT	6.5%
Whitsunday	Geoff Muntz	NAT	6.5%
Mirani	Jim Randell	NAT	6.6%
Burdekin	Mark Stoneman	NAT	6.7%
Isis	Lin Powell	NAT	7.1%
Mulgrave	Max Menzel	NAT	7.5%
South Coast	Russ Hinze	NAT	7.5%
Warrego	Neil Turner	NAT	7.7%
Mount Gravatt	Ian Henderson	NAT	7.9%
Safe
Toowoomba South	John Warner	NAT	10.0%
Aspley	Brian Cahill	NAT	10.4%
Peak Downs	Vince Lester	NAT	10.4%
Somerset	Bill Gunn	NAT	11.0%
Cooroora	Gordon Simpson	NAT	12.1%
Gregory	Bill Glasson	NAT	12.8%
Landsborough	Mike Ahern	NAT	13.9%
Southport	Doug Jennings	NAT	13.9%
Carnarvon	Peter McKechnie	NAT	14.3%
Gympie	Len Stephan	NAT	14.5%
Roma	Russell Cooper	NAT	15.5%
Burnett	Claude Wharton	NAT	16.1%
Surfers Paradise	Rob Borbidge	NAT	17.4%
Warwick	Des Booth	NAT	17.9%
Very safe
Auburn	Neville Harper	NAT	23.3%
Condamine	Brian Littleproud	NAT	23.8%
Lockyer	Tony Fitzgerald	NAT	24.1%
Balonne	Don Neal	NAT	24.4%
Barambah	Joh Bjelke-Petersen	NAT	28.5%
Cunningham	Tony Elliott	NAT	28.7%

Labor seats (32)
Marginal
Stafford	Dennis Murphy	ALP	0.1%
Salisbury	Wayne Goss	ALP	1.1%
Townsville	Ken McElligott	ALP	1.5%
Ashgrove	Tom Veivers	ALP	1.6%
Kurilpa	Anne Warner	ALP	2.0% v LIB
Windsor	Pat Comben	ALP	2.1%
Cairns	Keith De Lacy	ALP	2.2%
Mourilyan	Bill Eaton	ALP	2.7%
Mount Isa	Bill Price	ALP	2.8%
Port Curtis	Bill Prest	ALP	3.6%
Woodridge	Bill D'Arcy	ALP	5.1%
Murrumba	Joe Kruger	ALP	5.2%
Bundaberg	Clem Campbell	ALP	5.3%
Fairly safe
Mackay	Ed Casey	ALP	6.0%
Townsville West	Geoff Smith	ALP	6.3%
Everton	Glen Milliner	ALP	6.5%
Townsville South	Alex Wilson	ALP	7.0%
Chatsworth	Terry Mackenroth	ALP	7.6% v LIB
Wynnum	Eric Shaw	ALP	8.3%
South Brisbane	Jim Fouras	ALP	8.7%
Brisbane Central	Brian Davis	ALP	8.9% v LIB
Ipswich West	David Underwood	ALP	9.4%
Ipswich	David Hamill	ALP	9.7%
Safe
Bulimba	Ron McLean	ALP	10.0%
Rockhampton North	Les Yewdale	ALP	10.4%
Rockhampton	Keith Wright	ALP	11.4%
Nudgee	Ken Vaughan	ALP	12.4% v LIB
Sandgate	Nev Warburton	ALP	12.8%
Cook	Bob Scott	ALP	13.5%
Wolston	Bob Gibbs	ALP	14.3% v LIB
Very safe
Lytton	Tom Burns	ALP	21.4%
Archerfield	Kevin Hooper	ALP	21.6%
Liberal seats (8)
Marginal
Wavell	Brian Austin	LIB	1.3%
Yeronga	Norm Lee	LIB	2.9%
Ithaca	Col Miller	LIB	3.3%
Redcliffe	Terry White	LIB	5.0%
Fairly safe
Nundah	William Knox	LIB	6.2%
Merthyr	Don Lane	LIB	7.7%
Safe
Mount Coot-tha	Bill Lickiss	LIB	10.5% v NAT
Sherwood	Angus Innes	LIB	16.7%
Crossbench seats (1)
Callide	Lindsay Hartwig	IND	9.3% v NAT

== Aftermath ==
After the election, Bjelke-Petersen openly invited Liberal MLAs to defect to the Nationals. On 25 October, two Liberal MLAs, Brian Austin (Wavell) and Don Lane (Merthyr) took up Bjelke-Petersen's offer and joined the Nationals. This gave them 43 seats, a majority of two—the first time that the Nationals had governed in majority at any level in Australia.

This left only six Liberals, and marked the end of Terry White's leadership and Angus Innes' deputy leadership. Former leader Sir William Knox (Nundah) was returned to lead what remained of the party.

Labor had performed well, but not well enough, especially in North Queensland. Still, Labor strategists hoped that they had recovered enough seats to put them within striking distance of winning in 1986.

== See also ==
- Candidates of the Queensland state election, 1983
