= Country-National Organisation =

Former Australian political party

The Country-National Organisation (Note: Sometimes called the Country-National Party in later sources, e.g. Cilento, Sir Raphael (1959). Triumph in the Tropics: An Historical Sketch of Queensland. Smith & Paterson. p. 417., but contemporary sources show the body used "Organisation".) was a short-lived conservative political party in the Australian state of Queensland during the Second World War.

In Queensland the conservative parties had previously united from 1925 until 1936 as the Country and Progressive National Party but following a second defeat in 1935, the CPNP split into separate Country Party and United Australia Party branches. The two separate parties suffered further defeats in 1938 and 1941.

Then in April of the latter year, the new federal leader of the Country Party Arthur Fadden, MP for the Queensland Division of Darling Downs, sought to merge the Country and United Australia parties into a single force. Only in Queensland did this yield much success with the two parliamentary parties forming the Country-National Organisation. Former Country MP Frank Nicklin became the new leader of the party. However, the merger was resisted both by some Country Party MLAs and by the extra-parliamentary organisation, with the western division of the Queensland Country Party continuing to operate as a separate body. Former federal MP James Hunter worked hard for demerger, an aim achieved by 1944. A new Country Party constitution allowed co-operation but forbade merger with other parties. Nicklin continued as the leader of the Country Party which immediately hammered out a Coalition agreement with the Queensland People's Party, formed by John Beals Chandler and had absorbed the remains of the Queensland UAP branch. The QPP would later become the Liberal Party of Australia (Queensland Division) in 1949.

== See also ==
- Liberal National Party
