= Angus Innes =

Australian politician (born 1939)

Angus Innes MBE

Leader of the Queensland Liberal Party Elections: 1989
- In office 31 January 1988 – 13 May 1990
- Deputy: Peter Beard (1988–1989); Denver Beanland (1989–1990)
- Preceded by: William Knox
- Succeeded by: Denver Beanland

Deputy Leader of the Queensland Liberal Party
- In office November 1986 – 31 January 1988
- Leader: William Knox
- Preceded by: Bill Lickiss
- Succeeded by: Peter Beard
- In office 18 August 1983 – 3 November 1983
- Leader: Terry White
- Preceded by: Sam Doumany
- Succeeded by: Bill Lickiss

Member of the Queensland Legislative Assembly for Sherwood
- In office 25 November 1978 – 13 May 1990
- Preceded by: John Herbert
- Succeeded by: David Dunworth

Personal details
- Born: John Angus Mackenzie Innes; 22 May 1939 (age 87) United Kingdom
- Party: Liberal Party
- Spouse: Catherine Dunworth
- Education: University of Queensland
- Occupation: Barrister

John Angus Mackenzie Innes MBE (born 22 May 1939) is a former Queensland politician and leader of the state Liberal Party.

== Biography ==
Innes was elected to the Legislative Assembly of Queensland in 1978 representing the Brisbane-area seat of Sherwood at a by-election to fill a vacancy created by the death of John Herbert. Campaigning heavily on opposition to the controversial street march legislation of then-premier Joh Bjelke-Petersen, Innes easily won the seat, relegating the ruling National Party to a distant fourth place.

Progressive by nature, Innes had little time for the conservative social policies of the National-dominated government, even though under the coalition agreement between the Nationals and the Liberals, he was nominally a government backbencher. Innes became associated with a faction within the parliamentary Liberal Party dubbed by the media as the "ginger group", who frequently criticised government policy. Most of them were "small-l liberals" like Innes. The Liberal leader at the time, Deputy Premier Llew Edwards, was more supportive of Bjelke-Petersen and urged the unruly Liberal backbenchers to be "good coalitionists".

Innes did not agree with Edwards' assessment, and went as far as challenging Edwards' leadership of the party from the backbench. While Edwards survived, it was only by twelve votes to ten, making the growing power of the Ginger Group faction plain for all to see. Earlier, Bjelke-Petersen made it clear he would not be in government with a Liberal Party led by Innes, even at the expense of tearing up the Coalition and being reduced to a minority government.

The group eventually took power a year later when Ginger Group member Terry White deposed Edwards in a party-room coup and became Liberal leader. At that spill, Innes replaced Sam Doumany as deputy leader. This arrangement did not last long, however. When Bjelke-Petersen refused to appoint White as deputy premier, he and Innes pulled the Liberals out of the Coalition and led them to the crossbenches. In the ensuing 1983 election, Bjelke-Petersen convinced many right-leaning Liberal voters that White and Innes might join forces with Labor. As a result, the Liberals were reduced to a rump of only eight members. White and Innes were the only members of the "ginger group" to retain their seats. The Nationals came up one seat short of a majority, but were able to govern alone after two Liberals defected to the Nationals. Innes was deposed as deputy leader soon afterward.

Innes was reelected in 1986, helped by the fact that his National opponent forgot to submit the required paperwork in time. In January 1988, he became leader of the Liberal Party, taking over from William Knox.

Innes led the Liberals into the 1989 election. He hoped to recover some ground, but was well aware that if the Nationals lost significant ground in South East Queensland, many seats that could have theoretically been within striking distance for the Liberals could fall to Labor. At that election, while the Liberals picked up a four percent swing, they actually lost two seats due in part to a massive Labor surge in Brisbane. Labor took all but five seats in the capital, allowing it to win government after 32 years in opposition. Innes himself was nearly swept up in this massive Labor wave; his majority in Sherwood plunged from a comfortably safe 17.7 percent to a marginal 3.9 percent. He retired from politics soon afterwards.

Parliament of Queensland
Preceded by John Herbert	Member for Sherwood; 1978–1990	Succeeded by David Dunworth
Party political offices
Preceded by William Knox	Parliamentary Leader of the Liberal Party in Queensland; 1988–1990	Succeeded by Denver Beanland
