= Terry White =

Australian politician (born 1936)

The Honourable Terry White AO

Leader of the Queensland Liberal Party Elections: 1983
- In office 9 August 1983 – 3 November 1983
- Deputy: Angus Innes
- Preceded by: Llew Edwards
- Succeeded by: William Knox

Minister for Welfare Services
- In office 23 December 1980 – 4 August 1983
- Premier: Joh Bjelke-Petersen
- Preceded by: Sam Doumany
- Succeeded by: Bill Hewitt

Member of the Queensland Legislative Assembly for Redcliffe
- In office 1 September 1979 – 2 December 1989
- Preceded by: Jim Houghton
- Succeeded by: Ray Hollis

Personal details
- Born: Terrence Anthony White; 3 September 1936 (age 90) Nundah, Queensland, Australia
- Party: Liberal Party
- Spouse: Rhonda Mary Conn (m.1961)
- Education: University of Queensland
- Occupation: Chemist, Company director

Terrence Anthony White AO (born 3 September 1936) is an Australian pharmacist, businessman, and former politician. White achieved notoriety when, as Queensland state leader of the Liberal Party he terminated the longstanding coalition agreement between the Liberal Party and the National Party of Joh Bjelke-Petersen. In the ensuing election, the Liberals were badly defeated, and White was replaced as party leader. After leaving politics, he established TerryWhite Chemmart, a nationwide pharmacy franchise, and became a widely respected businessman.

In 2006, White was appointed an Officer of the Order of Australia. In 2012, White was a recipient of the Queensland Greats Awards.

== Early life ==
White was born in 1936, and received his initial education at the Sisters of Mercy convent in Sandgate, and St. Columban's at Albion. White showed ambition from a young age, attempting to enroll himself at Nudgee College without telling his parents so that he could receive a good education. White's working-class family were unable at first to pay the fees demanded by the school, but eventually, White's mechanic father Bill came to an arrangement with the school to waive Terry's fees in exchange for maintaining the college vehicles for free and for providing buses to transport the students to nearby suburbs for sporting events, when required.

After high school, White decided on the recommendation of a friend to study pharmacy. White endured 73 interviews with master pharmacists to find a position as an apprentice, before finally receiving a position at a pharmacy in Scarborough. After graduating as a pharmacist in his own right, White purchased a pharmacy at Woody Point in 1958. He later headed overseas and first experienced politics when he worked on the presidential campaign of John F. Kennedy. Upon his return to Australia, he joined the Queensland branch of the Liberal Party of Australia.

== Political career ==
=== Early career ===
White was first elected to parliament on 1 September 1979, at a by-election for the seat of Redcliffe following the retirement of incumbent National Party member Jim Houghton.

A small-l liberal, White was not at home with the conservative bent of the National-led government of Joh Bjelke-Petersen, even though he was technically a government backbencher. He advocated seeking senior status for the Liberals in the coalition with the National Party in order to ensure what he described as "responsible democratic government". In Queensland, the Nationals were traditionally the dominant partner in the non-Labor coalition, a reverse of the situation in the rest of Australia. White fell in with a group of MPs known as the "ginger group". This group disagreed with Bjelke-Petersen and Liberal leader Llew Edwards on a number of issues, including the system of electoral malapportionment in use within Queensland at the time, reducing the power of the National Party in the cabinet, and removing the controversial street march laws in place at the time. Despite many of these views being in opposition to Edwards' views and government policy, White was appointed as the minister for Welfare Services in December 1980, just fifteen months after entering parliament.

=== Minister ===
Despite his appointment to cabinet, White continued to have frequent differences of opinion with Edwards. Matters came to a head on 4 August 1983, when Liberal MLA Ian Prentice moved a motion to bring forward debate on the establishment of a public accounts committee to monitor government spending. While this had been approved by a resolution at a Liberal party convention, it was bitterly opposed by Bjelke-Petersen and Edwards was not keen to have it debated, for fear of destabilising the coalition. A division was called, and White and the rest of the "ginger group" crossed the floor to vote with the Labor opposition in favour of the motion. White argued that the principle of cabinet solidarity, which would normally compel him to vote against the motion, did not apply in this case because there was no official government policy on the matter.

This explanation did not sit well with Edwards, who promptly sacked White as Welfare Minister, with Bjelke-Petersen's vocal and public support. In response, White called a spill motion in the partyroom to declare the party leadership open. Edwards was unable to defeat this motion and declined to renominate for the party leadership. White was elected his successor.

=== Leader of the Liberal Party ===
Immediately after the spill, White and his new deputy, fellow "ginger group" member Angus Innes, made their way to Bjelke-Petersen's office in the Executive Building to inform him of the new leadership arrangements within the Liberal Party, as well as the need to revise the coalition agreement. Bjelke-Petersen kept the pair waiting outside his office for an hour, in full view of the media, while working on a way to bypass White and the Liberal Party altogether. Bjelke-Petersen had previously stated that he would not work with Innes, and when he finally admitted White and Innes to his office, he informed them that he would not be appointing White as the deputy premier, as was customary under the existing coalition arrangement.

In response, White pulled the Liberals out of the Coalition, leaving Bjelke-Petersen seven seats short of a majority. He tore up a copy of the press release issued by Bjelke-Petersen explaining his actions, a move that was interpreted by the media at the time as White symbolically tearing up long-standing coalition agreement. White then led the Liberal MLAs to the crossbench. However, he never actually had the opportunity to lead the Liberals on the floor of the legislature, because Bjelke-Petersen had some days earlier convinced the governor to indefinitely adjourn Parliament. Bjelke-Petersen was, therefore, able to govern for the nine weeks until the 1983 election, free from parliamentary scrutiny and the threat of a no-confidence motion.

At the election, Bjelke-Petersen targeted his campaign mainly at right-leaning Liberal voters. He suggested that under White, the Liberals might throw their support behind Labor. The Nationals scored a resounding victory, winning 41 seats in the 82-member parliament, one short of a majority. The Liberals lost 14 seats, leaving them with only eight MLAs. Of the 18 seats that were contested by both a National and a Liberal, the Nationals out-polled the Liberals in 15, and of the "ginger group", only White and Innes retained their seats. They faced the prospect of further blows when Bjelke-Petersen openly invited Liberal MLAs to defect to the Nationals. Two Liberals, Don Lane and Brian Austin, took up his offer, giving the Nationals an outright majority and leaving only six remaining Liberals. At the time, White remarked that "The scent of ministerial leather is a powerful aphrodisiac." That spelled the end of White's leadership, and William Knox was elected to lead the remnants of the party on 3 November. White's term as leader of the Liberal Party had lasted less than three months.

White remained in parliament as a Liberal backbencher. He remained a popular MP – for instance, at the 1986 election he swept every booth in his seat. He managed to stay out of the limelight until the Fitzgerald Inquiry. During 1988, he was subjected to numerous depositions about discussions that took place during his time in the cabinet. While he was ultimately cleared of wrongdoing, the numerous lawyers and accountants he had to employ ate into his parliamentary salary and nearly brought down his pharmacy business. At the 1989 state election, White was defeated in the massive Labor wave that swept through Queensland.

== Business career ==
After leaving parliament, White concentrated once more on his business career, encouraged by his wife Rhonda. He sold his first franchise in 1994, and by 2010 there were over 150 Terry White Chemists outlets across the country, the majority of which are owned and operated by franchisees. White has also served as President of the Pharmacy Guild, and was involved in the founding of the Australian Institute of Pharmacy Management.

In 2012, White was appointed Board Chairman of Metro South Hospital and Health Service (HHS), a government statutory body responsible for the management of five public hospitals, as well as a range of other healthcare facilities across the southside of Brisbane.

== Retirement ==
In February 2023, Terry and his wife Rhonda sold their remaining pharmacies in Australia Fair and the Myer Centre. They also sold their pharmacy services business, White Retail Group, to EBOS Group. The couple announced their retirement in September 2023. Post-retirement, White continued compiling and digitising his business and political documents for the State Library of Queensland.

== Honours ==
In the 2006 Australia Day Honours, White was appointed an Officer (AO) in the General Division of the Order of Australia.

White was inducted into the Queensland Business Leaders Hall of Fame in 2011, for his significant contribution to the advancement of the pharmacy profession (Terry White Chemists) and to his community.

In 2012, White was a recipient of the Queensland Greats Awards.

Political offices
Preceded by Llew Edwards	Parliamentary Leader of the Liberal Party in Queensland; 1983	Succeeded by William Knox
Preceded by new position	Minister for Welfare Services; 1980-1983	Succeeded by Bill Hewitt
Preceded by Jim Houghton	Member for Redcliffe; 1979–1989	Succeeded by Ray Hollis
