= William Knox (Queensland politician) =

Australian politician

The Hon Sir William Knox OSJ, KSJI

22nd Deputy Premier of Queensland
- In office 13 August 1976 – 9 October 1978
- Premier: Joh Bjelke-Petersen
- Preceded by: Gordon Chalk
- Succeeded by: Llew Edwards

Leader of the Queensland Liberal Party Elections: 1977, 1986
- In office 3 November 1983 – 31 January 1988
- Deputy: Bill Lickiss (1983–1986); Angus Innes (1986–1988)
- Preceded by: Terry White
- Succeeded by: Angus Innes
- In office 13 August 1976 – 6 October 1978
- Deputy: Fred Campbell
- Preceded by: Gordon Chalk
- Succeeded by: Llew Edwards

Minister for Employment and Labour Relations
- In office 23 December 1980 – 18 August 1983
- Premier: Joh Bjelke-Petersen
- Preceded by: Fred Campbell
- Succeeded by: Vince Lester

Minister for Health
- In office 15 December 1978 – 23 December 1980
- Premier: Joh Bjelke-Petersen
- Preceded by: Llew Edwards
- Succeeded by: Brian Austin

36th Treasurer of Queensland
- In office 13 August 1976 – 15 December 1978
- Premier: Joh Bjelke-Petersen
- Preceded by: Gordon Chalk
- Succeeded by: Llew Edwards

Deputy Leader of the Queensland Liberal Party
- In office 20 December 1971 – 13 August 1976
- Leader: Gordon Chalk
- Preceded by: Peter Delamothe
- Succeeded by: Fred Campbell

Attorney-General of Queensland and Minister for Justice
- In office 20 December 1971 – 13 August 1976
- Premier: Joh Bjelke-Petersen
- Preceded by: Peter Delamothe
- Succeeded by: Bill Lickiss

Minister for Transport
- In office 23 December 1965 – 20 June 1972
- Premier: Frank Nicklin; Jack Pizzey; Gordon Chalk; Joh Bjelke-Petersen
- Preceded by: Gordon Chalk
- Succeeded by: Keith Hooper

Member of the Queensland Legislative Assembly for Nundah
- In office 3 August 1957 – 2 December 1989
- Preceded by: Jim Hadley
- Succeeded by: Phil Heath

Personal details
- Born: 14 December 1927 Kew, Victoria
- Died: 22 September 2001 (aged 73)
- Party: Liberal Party
- Spouse: Doris Alexia Ross
- Children: 4
- Education: Melbourne High School
- Occupation: Company secretary, Company director

Sir William Edward Knox OSJ, KSJI (14 December 1927 – 22 September 2001) was born in Kew, Victoria, Australia and was the Member of the Legislative Assembly of Queensland representing the district of Nundah for the Liberal Party between from 1957 to 1989. He was Liberal leader in the Legislative Assembly of Queensland from 1976 to 1978 and again from 1983 to 1988 and was given life membership that same year.

== Early life ==
He was born in Kew, Victoria to Edward Knox and Bessie Alice (née Thomas).

Knox was one of the founders of the Liberal Party in Queensland and together with Sir James Killen established the Young Liberal movement in this state in 1949.

A company secretary and manager by profession, Knox was Vice President of the Queensland Liberal Party between 1956 and 1957.

== Political career ==
=== Member of Parliament ===
In 1957 he elected as the member for Nundah defeating Queensland Labor Party incumbent Jim Hadley, taking advantage of a split within Labor.

=== Government Minister ===
Knox entered the Ministry in 1965 as Transport Minister. He would later hold the portfolios of Health, Justice and Attorney-General.

After the retirement of Peter Delamothe in 1971 he was elected Deputy Liberal Leader, and in 1976 he succeeded Gordon Chalk as leader.

The Liberal's lost a net 6 seats at the 1977 election which led to his ousting as leader in favour of Llew Edwards in the hope that he would be more publicly assertive with Premier Bjelke-Petersen.

=== Return to the Leadership ===
When the Ginger Group replaced Llew Edwards with Terry White in 1983, Knox joined the rest of the Liberals in moving to crossbench. Following their heavy defeat at the 1983 election he was once again elected as leader to lead the rump group of 8 members.

He was replaced as leader by his deputy Angus Innes in 1988, and at the 1989 election he was by defeated the ALP's Phil Heath on a 13.4% swing.

== Post Political career ==
Upon losing his seat to the Labor he became involved in community groups.

== Personal life ==
He had 2 sons, 2 daughters with his wife Doris Ross.

He was State Chairman of the St John Ambulance Association and the President of the Association of Independent Schools of Queensland.

A state funeral was held for him.

Political offices
Preceded by Gordon Chalk	Parliamentary Leader of the Liberal Party in Queensland; 1976–1978	Succeeded by Llew Edwards
Preceded by Terry White	Parliamentary Leader of the Liberal Party in Queensland; 1983–1988	Succeeded by Angus Innes
Preceded by Gordon Chalk	Deputy Premier of Queensland; 1976–1978	Succeeded by Llew Edwards
Preceded by Gordon Chalk	Treasurer of Queensland; 1976–1978	Succeeded by Llew Edwards
Preceded by Gordon Chalk	Minister for Transport; 1965–1972	Succeeded by Keith Hooper
Parliament of Queensland
Preceded by Jim Hadley	Member for Nundah; 1957–1989	Succeeded by Phil Heath
