= Electoral district of Sherwood =

Sherwood Queensland—Legislative Assembly
- State: Queensland
- Dates current: 1950–1992
- Namesake: Sherwood

Sherwood was an electoral district of the Legislative Assembly in the Australian state of Queensland from 1950 to 1992.

First created for the 1950 state election, the district was based in the south-western suburbs of Brisbane, covering areas that previously belonged to the abolished district of Oxley. At first taking in a wide sweep of then-outer suburban areas such as Sunnybank, Runcorn and Kuraby, it came to be based in the Chelmer peninsula and the Centenary Suburbs from the 1960 election onwards, and was a very safe Liberal seat for most of its existence. However, it was nearly swept up in the massive Labor wave that swept through Brisbane in 1989; it was one of only five Liberal seats left in the capital.

Sherwood was abolished by the 1991 redistribution, taking effect at the 1992 state election. Most of its territory was allocated to the new districts of Indooroopilly and Mount Ommaney.

== Members for Sherwood ==
Member	Party	Term
Tom Kerr	Liberal	1950–1956
John Herbert	Liberal	1956–1978
Angus Innes	Liberal	1978–1990
David Dunworth	Liberal	1990–1992

== See also ==
- Electoral districts of Queensland
- Members of the Queensland Legislative Assembly by year
- Category:Members of the Queensland Legislative Assembly by name
