= Queensland Liberal Party =

Queensland Liberal Party Queensland People's Party (1943–1949)
- Abbreviation: LIB; LPQ; QPP (1943–1949)
- Leader: Full list
- Founded: 3 October 1943; 83 years ago
- Dissolved: 26 July 2008; 18 years ago
- Preceded by: United Australia Party
- Merged into: Liberal National
- Membership (1949): 20,764 (Note: In 1989, the party's membership sat at 14,200.)
- Ideology: Liberalism; Liberal conservatism
- Political position: Centre-right
- National affiliation: Federal Liberal (1945–2008)
- Electoral alliance: National–Liberal Coalition (1957–1983; 1995–2008)
- Colours: Blue
- Legislative Assembly: 30 / 82 (1974–1977)
- House of Representatives: 17 / 26 (Qld seats; 1996–1998)
- Senate: 6 / 12 (Qld seats; 2005–2008)
- Brisbane City Council: 16 / 26 (2008)

Website
- qld.liberal.org.au

The Queensland Liberal Party, officially known as the Liberal Party of Australia (Queensland Division), was the Queensland division of the centre-right to right-wing Liberal Party of Australia until 2008.

It was initially formed in October 1943 as the Queensland People's Party (QPP), which then absorbed the disbanded Queensland branch of the United Australia Party in 1944. In 1945, the QPP had an agreement with the newly formed Liberal Party, where in the "federal sphere", QPP would be the Queensland division of the Liberal Party and would run its candidates under the Liberal Party banner in federal elections. However, in the "state sphere", it would continue to exist individually under its own banner. In July 1949, the QPP was renamed to reflect its status as the Queensland division of the Liberal Party.

Based predominantly in Brisbane and other cities in Queensland, from 1957 it held power as the junior party in a coalition with the state Country Party, later the National Party, until 1983 when the Liberals broke away and went into opposition. The party formed another coalition with the Nationals that took power in 1996 but was defeated in 1998. After a further decade in opposition, in 2008, the two parties merged to form the Liberal National Party of Queensland.

== History ==
The centre-right in Queensland has a long history of splits and mergers, with much debate over whether to have a single party aiming to cover the whole state or to have distinctive voices for the metropolitan and rural areas. The Liberal Party was formed after a period that had seen three mergers and three splits in the preceding thirty years. Throughout its history it was beset by the question of relations with the Country/National Party until the two merged.

=== Origins ===
John Beals Chandler, the sitting Lord Mayor of Brisbane, was elected to the state parliament as an independent in the 1943 Hamilton state by-election on 9 October 1943. At the time the conservative forces in the parliament were united as the Country-National Organisation but this was under much pressure to split back into separate rural and urban parties which would happen the following year. Chandler disagreed with the Labor Party's collectivism, instead advocating mass capitalism and class-free politics, and this led him to found the Queensland People's Party (QPP) on 26 October 1943. The Country-National Organisation split up the following year, with the urban section reorganizing as the state branch of the United Australia Party. However, by then the UAP was in terminal decline at all levels, and the Queensland UAP was soon absorbed by Chandler's party. At the 1944 state election the party won seven seats, all in Brisbane. The Queensland People's Party contested elections in South East Queensland.

=== Affiliation with the Liberal Party ===
The following year, the national UAP was folded into the Liberal Party, and by April 1945, 17 non-Labor forces in Queensland joined the Liberal Party. However, the QPP declined to dissolve itself and join the Liberal Party, leading the Liberal Party the possibility to have to organise its own Queensland division. However, in May 1945, the QPP eventually reached an agreement with the Liberal Party, where the QPP agreed to become the local apparatus of the Liberal Party for federal elections. That meant in the "federal sphere" or relating to federal matters, QPP would be the Queensland division of the Liberal Party. During federal elections, QPP candidates would run under the Liberal Party banner and were bound by the Liberal Party policy and platform. In the "state sphere", QPP would run candidates under its own banner in state elections, and its candidates were bound by QPP policy and platform. All candidates would be selected by a joint executive consisting of the state provisional executive of the Liberal Party and QPP representatives.

Chandler was succeeded as leader in 1946 by Bruce Pie, a fellow Brisbane based businessman, who led the party to an increase to nine seats in the 1947 state election, offering a bold reform policy that at times clashed with the Country Party's aims. However both Chandler and Pie had business concerns, as well as the former's continued local government role, that meant they could not devote all their time to leading the party. Thomas Hiley took over the leadership in 1948.

Since 1946, there were attempts to rename the QPP to the Liberal Party, including an unsuccessful attempt in October 1948. Hiley was also opposed to a name change. In November 1948, the party expressed its intention to merge with the Country Party, with a potential name "Liberal-Country Party League", similar to the Liberal and Country League in South Australia. However, this was refused by the Country Party as mergers with other parties would violate its party constitution. On 8 July 1949, QPP delegates agreed to a name change and the QPP was renamed Liberal Party of Australia (Queensland Division) to be in line with other Liberal Party state divisions.

Relations with the Country Party remained uneasy for much of the next decade through the leaderships of Hiley and then Kenneth Morris and it was not until 1956 that they were firmly settled. Although the party polled between 20% and 30% of the vote over successive elections, it could not elect more than 11 members and was further hampered by the introduction of a malapportionment in 1949 that strengthened both the Labor and Country parties. The party was also almost entirely limited to electoral success in Brisbane, apart from the seat of East Toowoomba/Lockyer where future leader Gordon Chalk had gained the seat in 1947 and followed the rural parts in a redistribution.

=== Coalition government, 1957–1983 ===
In 1957 the Labor Party in Queensland was engulfed in the split that had been growing in the party across Australia over the influence of communism. The sitting Premier Vince Gair was expelled from the party and led a breakaway Queensland Labor Party that sought to retain office. However, when the state parliament resumed sitting, the Liberal, Country and rump Labor parties combined to block supply, bringing down the Gair government and leading to the 1957 state election at which the Country and Liberal coalition won power after a quarter of a century.

The Liberals were still the smaller of the two coalition parties in the state parliament despite polling more votes, a position that was reinforced when the new government modified the malapportionment to its advantage despite some Liberal opposition. Later in 1962 the Liberals secured the reintroduction of preferential voting which would allow the non-Labor vote to combine but also in the long term allowed for the two coalition parties to contest seats against one another. However, for much of the first decade in power relations between the two coalition parties held well, helped by a determination to maintain the relation by Premier and Country Party leader Frank Nicklin and a succession of Liberal leaders including Kenneth Morris, Alan Munro, a brief return by Thomas Hiley and Gordon Chalk. In 1959 a Liberal convention passed a resolution to offer to merge with the Country Party "on any reasonable terms", but the latter rejected both this and a further offer in 1963. However tensions started growing on several fronts, which put pressure on the traditional allocation of seats between the two partners. Brisbane's growth was rapidly spilling onto the Redcliffe Peninsula, and the Gold Coast was also seeing growing urbanisation. Additionally, the Liberals were setting up new branches in traditional Country Party areas. The 1966 state election saw the Country and Liberal parties stand against each other in eight seats, but none changed between the coalition partners.

Relations deteriorated during the premiership of Nicklin's longterm successor, Joh Bjelke-Petersen. The parties got off to a poor start when the previous premier, Jack Pizzey, died suddenly and Liberal leader Gordon Chalk was appointed as a temporary successor until the Country Party elected a new leader but at first tried to retain the office for himself until Bjelke-Petersen threatened to break up the coalition. Bjelke-Petersen also moved to refine the malapportionment further, now dubbed the "Bjelkemander", which reinforced the Country Party's superior position. However steady urbanisation in the state increased pressure on relations between the parties as traditional Country Party areas turned into Liberal targets. An early conflict came in the Albert by-election in 1970. The electoral district of Albert, based around the Gold Coast, had been in Country Party hands since 1936 but over the 1960s saw increased electoral pressure from first independents and then the Liberals. The by-election saw the Country Party vote collapse and the Liberals take the seat. Bjelke-Petersen barely survived an ensuing leadership challenge. There was little electoral change in the 1969 and 1972 state elections, but in the next few years the Country Party became increasingly assertive, changing its name to the "National Party" (a name adopted by its federal counterpart in 1982), standing in more urban seats and increasingly taking on the federal Whitlam government as part of greater assertiveness. The 1974 state election saw the Labor Party routed with both National and Liberal parties picking up seats. With Labor increasingly unviable as a party of government, conflict between the two coalition parties increased as they stood against each other in more and more seats. The Liberals were outpolled by the Nationals at the 1977 state election and subsequently diminished in influence in the cabinet.

In government itself the two parties held together, with the Liberals suffering increasing division over tactics between the parliamentary leadership, the backbenchers and the extra-parliamentary party. Chalk had retired in 1976, succeeded by William Knox who lasted just over two years before being replaced by Llewellyn Edwards. However, despite backbench demands for a stronger Liberal approach, the leadership felt unable to deliver it. At the 1980 state election the Nationals gained further seats at the expense of the Liberals, with tensions building further. The breakdown in relations spilled over in federal politics, leading to the two parties running competing Senate tickets at the 1980 federal election, costing the Coalition a seat and thus its majority. A growing group of Liberal members of parliament dubbed the "Ginger Group" increasingly challenged both their own leadership and the Nationals. Most Ginger Group MPs were "small-l liberals" who were not at home with the strongly conservative bent of the Bjelke-Petersen government. In 1982, Ginger Group member Angus Innes challenged Edwards for the leadership, despite Bjelke-Petersen declaring he would prefer a minority government to a coalition with Innes, and only narrowly lost by 12:10. Matters boiled over the following year when Terry White, the Liberal Minister for Welfare Services and a member of the Ginger Group, voted against the government line in a debate on creating a public accounts committee to monitor public spending. This was in line with Liberal policy but against the government position, although White disputed the latter point. Edwards sacked White from cabinet, prompting White to challenge Edwards' leadership. White won, with Innes elected as deputy. Bjelke-Petersen refused to appoint White as Deputy Premier, prompting White to tear up the Coalition agreement and lead the Liberals to the crossbench. The Nationals governed as a minority for a few months until the 1983 state election at which the Liberals were reduced to a mere eight seats. The Nationals were one seat short of an outright majority and openly courted Liberals to switch parties. Soon two Liberals, Brian Austin and Don Lane, switched to the Nationals in return for cabinet posts, supplying them with a majority in their own right.

=== The long path to merger ===
Terry White was soon deposed as leader and replaced by the return of William Knox. However the Liberals were unable to recover much ground at the 1986 election which saw the Nationals consolidate their position and win an outright majority. Angus Innes became leader in 1988 as the National government was in decline, but proved unable to make any headway in the 1989 election which saw Labor take power for the first time in over thirty years. Labor took all but five seats in Brisbane, mainly at the Liberals' expense.

The new Labor government of Wayne Goss dismantled the "Bjelkemander" and as a result Brisbane now elected nearly half the state parliament. Furthermore, the preferential voting system was changed to optional preferencing, making it harder for the Nationals and Liberals to contest the same seats without risking loss to Labor. These changes would have the effect of altering the relationship between the two parties as the Nationals could no longer seek government in their own right but the Liberals initially instead sought to achieve senior status. Growing urbanisation saw them steadily replace the Nationals as the main conservative party on first the Sunshine Coast and then the Gold Coast. The Liberals elected their first female leader, Joan Sheldon, who was seen as less hostile to the National Party than Innes, but the parties contested the 1992 election separately and made no real advance. Two months after the election, Sheldon and Nationals leader Rob Borbidge signed a new coalition agreement, allowing them to present a united front in the 1995 election. The initial results saw Labor retain power with a one-seat majority, but this was overturned when the result in one seat was declared void and the Liberals won the subsequent by-election. With the support of an independent, the National-Liberal coalition took power, holding it until 1998.

However the coalition faced a strong threat from the rise of Pauline Hanson's One Nation party that challenged on issues such as multiculturalism, gun ownership and native title. One Nation's appeal resonated well the Nationals' heartland of rural and regional Queensland. The Coalition also suffered a backlash against the introduction of gun control laws after the Port Arthur massacre. At the 1998 election the Coalition lost much support to One Nation and fell from power. The election also saw the Liberals poll more votes than the Nationals for the first time in over a quarter of a century despite the latter winning more seats and this outcome would recur for the next decade. However they remained behind in seats and conflicting approaches to One Nation voters and transfers meant the two parties were undermining each other's approach. At the 2001 election, the Coalition only suffered a two-percent swing. However, the Liberals were all but wiped out in Brisbane, falling to only one seat there, that of leader David Watson. They only won two other seats in that election, those of Shelton and Bob Quinn, who replaced Watson as leader after the election. This was easily the worst showing for the urban non-Labor party in Queensland since it adopted the Liberal banner.

The next seven years saw the Liberals in the awkward position of having been incredibly weakened by both the Nationals and Labor but also facing a potentially easier route to senior status over the Nationals, as the latter had been almost wiped out on the Gold and Sunshine Coasts with the Liberals starting to retake the seats. The party made only limited advances at the 2004 and 2006 elections. While it seemed increasingly likely the Liberals would be the larger party in any future coalition government, it also presented the awkward question of which party leader would be Premier, a question that Bruce Flegg, who replaced Quinn as leader in 2006, struggled to answer. A proposal was made in 2005 to merge the two parties but this provoked much opposition, including from the federal governing coalition. Following the federal defeat in the 2007 election and the proposal was revived, and in July 2008 under leader Mark McArdle the party agreed to merge with the Nationals as the Liberal National Party, with McArdle as the merged party's deputy leader. The merged party has full voting rights with the Liberal Party and observer status with the National Party, even though at the time more of its elected members were former Nationals.

The merged party has so far lasted a decade, but from time to time calls are made for the parties to demerge from both Liberals and Nationals.

John-Paul Langbroek, from the Liberal side of the merger, took over the leadership following the resignation of founding leader Lawrence Springborg. It was the first time in 84 years that the non-Labor side in Queensland had been led by someone aligned federally with the Liberals or their predecessors. Langbroek gave way in 2011 to another former Liberal, Brisbane Lord Mayor Campbell Newman, who led the party to a record landslide victory in 2012, including all but three seats in Brisbane. The LNP was rolled out of office after only one term in 2015.

=== Brisbane city government ===
As well as state elections, the Liberals also regularly contested the elections for the City of Brisbane, the largest local authority in Australia. The position of Lord Mayor of Brisbane was made a directly elected one in 1982, with the Liberals first winning the post in the 1985 election with Sallyanne Atkinson. The party also won a majority on the council and held both in the 1988 election. Following Atkinson's defeat in the 1991 election, the Liberals did not win the mayoralty again until the 2004 election when Campbell Newman won the post but with a Labor majority on the council. Newman was re-elected in 2008, this time with a Liberal majority on the council.

== Leaders ==
Leader	Date started	Date finished
Founded as Queensland People's Party
John Beals Chandler	26 October 1943	7 March 1946
Bruce Pie	8 March 1946	2 February 1948
Thomas Hiley	3 February 1948	9 July 1949
Becomes the Liberal Party
Thomas Hiley	9 July 1949	12 August 1954
Kenneth Morris	17 August 1954	23 August 1962
Alan Munro	23 August 1962	28 January 1965
Thomas Hiley	28 January 1965	23 December 1965
Gordon Chalk	23 December 1965	13 August 1976
William Knox	13 August 1976	6 October 1978
Llewellyn Edwards	9 October 1978	9 August 1983
Terry White	9 August 1983	3 November 1983
William Knox	3 November 1983	31 January 1988
Angus Innes	31 January 1988	13 May 1990
Denver Beanland	13 May 1990	11 November 1991
Joan Sheldon	11 November 1991	23 June 1998
David Watson	23 June 1998	28 February 2001
Bob Quinn	28 February 2001	7 August 2006
Bruce Flegg	7 August 2006	4 December 2007
Mark McArdle	6 December 2007	26 July 2008
Merged into the Liberal National Party of Queensland

== Election results ==
Election	Leader	Votes	%	Seats	+/–	Position	Government
1944	John Beals Chandler	124,437	24.72	7 / 62	▲3	3rd	Opposition
1947	Bruce Pie	160,623	25.73	9 / 62	▲2	3rd	Opposition
1950	Thomas Hiley	188,331	29.91	11 / 75	▲2	3rd	Opposition
1953	Thomas Hiley	129,633	21.30	8 / 75	▼3	3rd	Opposition
1956	Kenneth Morris	164,116	25.07	8 / 75	0	3rd	Opposition
1957	Kenneth Morris	162,372	23.23	18 / 75	▲10	3rd	Coalition
1960	Kenneth Morris	178,567	24.03	20 / 78	▲2	3rd	Coalition
1963	Alan Munro	183,185	23.76	20 / 78	0	3rd	Coalition
1966	Gordon Chalk	203,648	25.49	20 / 78	0	3rd	Coalition
1969	Gordon Chalk	201,765	23.68	19 / 78	▼1	3rd	Coalition
1972	Gordon Chalk	201,596	22.23	21 / 82	▲2	3rd	Coalition
1974	Gordon Chalk	324,682	31.09	30 / 82	▲9	▲2nd	Coalition
1977	William Knox	274,398	25.22	24 / 82	▼6	2nd	Coalition
1980	Llewellyn Edwards	316,272	26.92	22 / 82	▼2	▼3rd	Coalition
1983	Terry White	196,072	14.88	8 / 82	▼14	3rd	Crossbench
1986	William Knox	230,310	16.50	10 / 89	▲2	3rd	Crossbench
1989	Angus Innes	331,562	21.05	8 / 89	▼2	3rd	Crossbench
1992	Joan Sheldon	356,640	20.44	9 / 89	▲1	3rd	Crossbench
1995	Joan Sheldon	410,083	22.74	14 / 89	▲5	3rd	Opposition
1998	Joan Sheldon	311,514	16.09	9 / 89	▼5	3rd	Opposition
2001	David Watson	294,968	14.32	3 / 89	▼6	3rd	Opposition
2004	Bob Quinn	398,147	18.50	5 / 89	▲2	3rd	Opposition
2006	Bruce Flegg	442,453	20.10	8 / 89	▲3	3rd	Opposition

== See also ==
- Category:Liberal Party of Australia members of the Parliament of Queensland

== Bibliography ==
- Coaldrake, Peter (1989). Working the System: Government in Queensland. University of Queensland Press. ISBN 978-0702222306.
- Fitzgerald, Ross (1984). From 1915 to the Early 1980s: A History of Queensland. University of Queensland Press. ISBN 9780702217340.
- Hughes, Colin A. (1980). The Government of Queensland. University of Queensland Press. ISBN 978-0702215155.
