= Llew Edwards (politician) =

Australian politician (1935–2021)

The Honourable Sir Llew Edwards AC
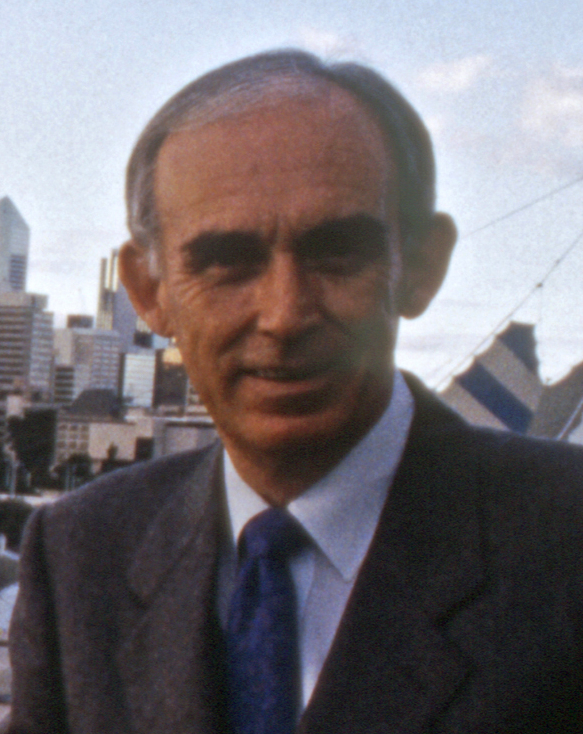
- Llew Edwards at World Expo 88

37th Treasurer of Queensland
- In office 15 December 1978 – 18 August 1983
- Premier: Joh Bjelke-Petersen
- Preceded by: William Knox
- Succeeded by: Joh Bjelke-Petersen

23rd Deputy Premier of Queensland
- In office 9 October 1978 – 18 August 1983
- Premier: Joh Bjelke-Petersen
- Preceded by: William Knox
- Succeeded by: Bill Gunn

Leader of the Queensland Liberal Party Elections: 1980
- In office 9 October 1978 – 9 August 1983
- Deputy: Fred Campbell (1978–1980); Sam Doumany (1980–1983)
- Preceded by: William Knox
- Succeeded by: Terry White

Minister for Health
- In office 23 December 1974 – 15 December 1978
- Premier: Joh Bjelke-Petersen
- Preceded by: Douglas Tooth
- Succeeded by: William Knox

Member of the Queensland Legislative Assembly for Ipswich
- In office 27 May 1972 – 22 October 1983
- Preceded by: New seat
- Succeeded by: David Hamill

Personal details
- Born: 2 August 1935 Ipswich, Queensland
- Died: 26 May 2021 (aged 85) Brisbane, Queensland
- Party: Liberal Party
- Spouse: Leone Burley (d. 1988) Jane Brumfield (1989)
- Education: University of Queensland
- Occupation: Electrician, Medical practitioner, Surgical Registrar

Sir Llewellyn Roy Edwards AC (2 August 1935 – 26 May 2021), known as Llew Edwards, was an Australian politician. He was the Liberal Party leader for Queensland. He was Chair and CEO of Brisbane's World Expo '88.

== Early life and education ==
Llew Edwards started his working life as an electrician in his family's electrical business. He graduated from the University of Queensland with a medical degree (MB BS) in 1965.

== Political career ==
Edwards entered the Queensland Legislative Assembly as the Liberal member for Ipswich in 1972. He was the Minister for Health between 1974–1978 and then held the position of Liberal Party leader, Deputy Premier and Treasurer until 1983 when he retired from the Queensland Parliament to take on the role of chairman and chief executive of World Expo '88, held in Brisbane in 1988.

== Later activities ==
Edwards was Chair and CEO of the 1988 World Exposition, Brisbane's World Expo '88.

In 1993, he was elected the twelfth Chancellor of the University of Queensland, holding the office until 9 February 2009. He received an Honorary Doctor of Laws degree from the university in 1988.

In 1984, he was made a Knight Bachelor and, in 1989, a Companion of the Order of Australia.

Edwards has sat on the boards of a number of publicly listed companies. He was a director of James Hardie Industries for a decade, and was appointed chairman of the Medical Research and Compensation Foundation, set up by James Hardie to provide financial compensation for victims of asbestos-related diseases caused by the company's products. He criticised the company for providing insufficient funds for the foundation, stating that it had underestimated the amount of liability for claims.

In 2009, the Sir Llew Edwards Building at the University of Queensland's St Lucia campus was named after him.

In 2010, Edwards was named by premier Anna Bligh as one of six "Queensland Greats". The citation stated that he was "an outstanding Queenslander who has made exceptional contributions to many fields".

On 28 April 2013, a plaque commemorating the 25th anniversary of World Expo 88 and Llew Edward's leadership of the event was unveiled at the South Bank Parklands (the site of Expo 88) by Brisbane Lord Mayor Graham Quirk and Queensland Premier Campbell Newman.

== Later life ==
Edwards died on 26 May 2021 in Brisbane. He was 85 years old and had been suffering from dementia. A state funeral was held at 2pm on Thursday 3 June 2021 at the St John's Cathedral in Brisbane with the Australian flag being flown at half-mast throughout Queensland.

Political offices
Preceded by William Knox	Deputy Premier of Queensland; 1978–1983	Succeeded by Bill Gunn
Preceded by William Knox	Treasurer of Queensland; 1978–1983	Succeeded by Joh Bjelke-Petersen
Preceded by Douglas Tooth	Minister for Health; 1974–1978	Succeeded by William Knox
Parliament of Queensland
New seat	Member for Ipswich; 1972–1983	Succeeded by David Hamill
Party political offices
Preceded by William Knox	Parliamentary Leader of the Liberal Party in Queensland; 1978–1983	Succeeded by Terry White
Academic offices
Preceded by Sir James Foots	Chancellor of the University of Queensland; 1993–2009	Succeeded by John Story
