= Electoral results for the district of Merthyr =

Queensland, Australia, district election results

This is a list of electoral results for the electoral district of Merthyr in Queensland state elections.

== Members for Merthyr ==
Member	Party	Term
Thomas Welsby	Ministerialist	1912–1915
Peter McLachlan	Labor	1915–1920
Peter MacGregor	National	1920–1923
Peter McLachlan	Labor	1923–1929
Patrick Kerwin	Country and Progressive National	1929–1932
James Keogh	Labor	1932–1940
William Moore	Labor	1940–1957
William Moore	Queensland Labor	1957
Sam Ramsden	Liberal	1957–1971
Don Lane	Liberal	1971–1983
Don Lane	National	1983–1989
Santo Santoro	Liberal	1989–1992

== Election results ==
=== Elections in the 1980s ===
1989 Queensland state election: Merthyr
Party	Candidate	Votes	%	±%
Labor	Barbara Dawson	8,662	48.4	+15.9
Liberal	Santo Santoro	7,267	40.6	+8.5
National	Pat Kelly	1,955	10.9	−21.9
Total formal votes		17,884	97.0	+0.1
Informal votes		548	3.0	+0.1
Turnout		18,432	94.5	+5.2
Two-party-preferred result
Liberal	Santo Santoro	9,024	50.5	+50.5
Labor	Barbara Dawson	8,860	49.5	+5.5
Liberal gain from National		Swing	N/A	

1989 Merthyr state by-election
Party	Candidate	Votes	%	±%
Liberal	Santo Santoro	6,170	35.91	+3.82
Labor	Barbara Dawson	5,623	32.73	+0.23
National	Betty Byrne-Henderson	2,753	16.02	–16.74
Independent	Nigel Powell	1,281	7.46	+7.46
Independent	Tanya Wilde	540	3.14	+3.14
Democrats	John Brown	443	2.58	+0.82
Independent	Gerry Bellino	334	1.94	+1.94
Independent	I. Ciadamidaro	36	0.21	+0.21
Total formal votes		17,180	95.29	–1.60
Informal votes		848	4.71	+1.60
Turnout		18,028	78.92	−10.35
Two-party-preferred result
Liberal	Santo Santoro	9,784	56.95	N/A
Labor	Barbara Dawson	7,396	43.05	N/A
Liberal gain from National		Swing	N/A	

1986 Queensland state election: Merthyr
Party	Candidate	Votes	%	±%
National	Don Lane	5,553	32.8	+7.2
Labor	Garrett Purtill	5,507	32.5	−8.1
Liberal	Santo Santoro	5,439	32.1	−0.4
Democrats	Bernard O'Malley	298	1.8	+1.8
Socialist Workers	Maurice Sibelle	149	0.9	+0.9
Total formal votes		16,946	96.9	
Informal votes		544	3.1	
Turnout		17,490	89.3	
Two-party-preferred result
National	Don Lane	9,497	56.0	−3.8
Labor	Garrett Purtill	7,449	44.0	+3.8
National gain from Liberal		Swing	N/A	

1983 Queensland state election: Merthyr
Party	Candidate	Votes	%	±%
Labor	Leon Pearce	5,520	40.6	−4.9
Liberal	Don Lane	4,416	32.5	−22.0
National	William Owen	3,480	25.6	+25.6
Independent	Gary Waddell	183	1.4	+1.4
Total formal votes		13,599	97.9	+0.8
Informal votes		288	2.1	−0.8
Turnout		13,887	89.8	+5.8
Two-party-preferred result
Liberal	Don Lane	7,853	57.7	+3.2
Labor	Leon Pearce	5,746	42.3	−3.2
Liberal hold		Swing	+3.2	

1980 Queensland state election: Merthyr
Party	Candidate	Votes	%	±%
Liberal	Don Lane	7,334	54.5	+0.9
Labor	Barbara Dawson	6,116	45.5	+3.1
Total formal votes		13,450	97.1	−0.4
Informal votes		398	2.9	+0.4
Turnout		13,848	84.0	−4.6
Liberal hold		Swing	−1.9	

=== Elections in the 1970s ===
1977 Queensland state election: Merthyr
Party	Candidate	Votes	%	±%
Liberal	Don Lane	7,508	53.6	−12.9
Labor	Barbara Dawson	5,937	42.4	+8.9
Progress	Harold Scruton	550	3.9	+3.9
Total formal votes		13,995	97.5	
Informal votes		356	2.5	
Turnout		14,351	88.6	
Two-party-preferred result
Liberal	Don Lane	7,893	56.4	−10.1
Labor	Barbara Dawson	6,102	43.6	+10.1
Liberal hold		Swing	−10.1	

1974 Queensland state election: Merthyr
Party	Candidate	Votes	%	±%
Liberal	Don Lane	7,004	66.6	+14.4
Labor	Terence Dawson	3,517	33.4	−6.1
Total formal votes		10,521	97.8	0.0
Informal votes		241	2.2	0.0
Turnout		10,762	85.0	−7.5
Liberal hold		Swing	+7.5	

1972 Queensland state election: Merthyr
Party	Candidate	Votes	%	±%
Liberal	Don Lane	5,369	52.2	+2.3
Labor	Denis Pie	4,058	39.5	−0.9
Queensland Labor	James Moss	849	8.3	−1.4
Total formal votes		10,276	97.8	
Informal votes		228	2.2	
Turnout		10,504	92.5	
Two-party-preferred result
Liberal	Don Lane	6,075	59.1	+2.5
Labor	Denis Pie	4,201	40.9	−2.5
Liberal hold		Swing	+2.5	

1971 Merthyr state by-election
Party	Candidate	Votes	%	±%
Liberal	Don Lane	4,026	53.1	+3.2
Labor	Brian Mellifont	2,672	35.3	−5.1
Queensland Labor	Peter Flanagan	882	11.6	+1.9
Total formal votes		7,580	97.6	+0.5
Informal votes		187	2.4	−0.5
Turnout		7,767	73.9	−13.4
Liberal hold		Swing	N/A	

- Preferences were not distributed.

=== Elections in the 1960s ===
1969 Queensland state election: Merthyr
Party	Candidate	Votes	%	±%
Liberal	Sam Ramsden	4,508	49.9	−1.2
Labor	Brian Mellifont	3,651	40.4	+0.4
Queensland Labor	Maurice O'Connor	880	9.7	+0.8
Total formal votes		9,039	97.1	+0.1
Informal votes		268	2.9	−0.1
Turnout		9,307	87.3	−4.2
Two-party-preferred result
Liberal	Sam Ramsden	5,182	57.3	−0.2
Labor	Brian Mellifont	3,857	42.7	+0.2
Liberal hold		Swing	−0.2	

1966 Queensland state election: Merthyr
Party	Candidate	Votes	%	±%
Liberal	Sam Ramsden	4,781	51.1	−2.3
Labor	Brian Mellifont	3,745	40.0	+3.0
Queensland Labor	Laurence Kehoe	830	8.9	−0.6
Total formal votes		9,356	97.0	−0.4
Informal votes		284	3.0	+0.4
Turnout		9,640	91.5	0.0
Two-party-preferred result
Liberal	Sam Ramsden	5,384	57.5	−3.7
Labor	Brian Mellifont	3,972	42.5	+3.7
Liberal hold		Swing	−3.7	

1963 Queensland state election: Merthyr
Party	Candidate	Votes	%	±%
Liberal	Sam Ramsden	5,298	53.4	+3.3
Labor	Tom Campbell	3,672	37.0	+3.8
Queensland Labor	Geoffrey Traill	946	9.5	−7.2
Total formal votes		9,916	97.4	−0.7
Informal votes		268	2.6	+0.7
Turnout		10,184	91.5	+2.9
Two-party-preferred result
Liberal	Sam Ramsden	6,068	61.2	
Labor	Tom Campbell	3,848	38.8	
Liberal hold		Swing	N/A	

1960 Queensland state election: Merthyr
Party	Candidate	Votes	%	±%
Liberal	Sam Ramsden	5,376	50.1	
Labor	Tom Campbell	3,562	33.2	
Queensland Labor	Mick O'Connor	1,794	16.7	
Total formal votes		10,732	98.1	
Informal votes		205	1.9	
Turnout		10,937	88.6	
Liberal hold		Swing		

=== Elections in the 1950s ===
1957 Queensland state election: Merthyr
Party	Candidate	Votes	%	±%
Liberal	Sam Ramsden	3,151	37.0	−3.2
Queensland Labor	Bill Moore	3,028	35.6	+35.6
Labor	Tom Campbell	2,336	27.4	−32.4
Total formal votes		8,515	99.0	+0.4
Informal votes		88	1.0	−0.4
Turnout		8,603	94.1	+3.1
Liberal gain from Labor		Swing	N/A	

1956 Queensland state election: Merthyr
Party	Candidate	Votes	%	±%
Labor	Bill Moore	5,030	59.8	−4.0
Liberal	Sam Ramsden	3,380	40.2	+4.0
Total formal votes		8,410	98.6	−0.1
Informal votes		120	1.4	+0.1
Turnout		8,530	91.0	−2.9
Labor hold		Swing	−4.0	

1953 Queensland state election: Merthyr
Party	Candidate	Votes	%	±%
Labor	Bill Moore	6,110	63.8	+7.8
Liberal	William Knox	3,470	36.2	−7.8
Total formal votes		9,580	98.7	0.0
Informal votes		129	1.3	0.0
Turnout		9,709	93.9	+0.5
Labor hold		Swing	+7.8	

1950 Queensland state election: Merthyr
Party	Candidate	Votes	%	±%
Labor	Bill Moore	5,948	56.0	
Liberal	Albert Rees	4,669	44.0	
Total formal votes		10,617	98.7	
Informal votes		134	1.3	
Turnout		10,751	93.4	
Labor hold		Swing		

=== Elections in the 1940s ===
1947 Queensland state election: Merthyr
Party	Candidate	Votes	%	±%
Labor	Bill Moore	5,865	55.4	+0.7
People's Party	Bert Frost	4,726	44.6	−0.7
Total formal votes		10,591	98.3	+0.2
Informal votes		183	1.7	−0.2
Turnout		10,774	90.2	+1.5
Labor hold		Swing	+0.7	

1944 Queensland state election: Merthyr
Party	Candidate	Votes	%	±%
Labor	Bill Moore	5,322	54.7	−3.7
People's Party	Leonard King	4,400	45.3	+3.7
Total formal votes		9,722	98.1	−0.2
Informal votes		184	1.9	+0.2
Turnout		9,906	88.7	−5.0
Labor hold		Swing	−3.7	

1941 Queensland state election: Merthyr
Party	Candidate	Votes	%	±%
Labor	Bill Moore	5,302	58.4	+9.1
United Australia	Samuel Glassey	3,780	41.6	+11.8
Total formal votes		9,082	98.3	−0.7
Informal votes		158	1.7	+0.7
Turnout		9,240	93.7	+2.8
Labor hold		Swing	+4.6	

1940 Merthyr state by-election
Party	Candidate	Votes	%	±%
Labor	Bill Moore	4,839	57.5	+8.2
United Australia	Patrick Kerwin	3,574	42.5	+12.7
Total formal votes		8,413		
Informal votes				
Turnout				
Labor hold		Swing	+3.7	

=== Elections in the 1930s ===
1938 Queensland state election: Merthyr
Party	Candidate	Votes	%	±%
Labor	James Keogh	4,801	49.3	−17.2
United Australia	Edmund Cuppaidge	2,903	29.8	−3.7
Protestant Labour	Frederick Brown	2,042	20.9	+20.9
Total formal votes		9,746	99.0	+0.7
Informal votes		97	1.0	−0.7
Turnout		9,843	90.9	−0.6
Two-party-preferred result
Labor	James Keogh	4,982	53.8	−12.7
United Australia	Edmund Cuppaidge	4,272	46.2	+12.7
Labor hold		Swing	−12.7	

1935 Queensland state election: Merthyr
Party	Candidate	Votes	%	±%
Labor	James Keogh	6,035	66.5	
CPNP	William Stevens	3,046	33.5	
Total formal votes		9,081	98.3	
Informal votes		155	1.7	
Turnout		9,236	91.5	
Labor hold		Swing		

1932 Queensland state election: Merthyr
Party	Candidate	Votes	%	±%
Labor	James Keogh	4,780	51.6	
CPNP	Patrick Kerwin	4,293	46.4	
Lang Labor	Kenneth McDonald	187	2.0	
Total formal votes		9,259	99.4	
Informal votes		54	0.6	
Turnout		9,313	84.0	
Labor gain from CPNP		Swing		

- Preferences were not distributed.

=== Elections in the 1920s ===
1929 Queensland state election: Merthyr
Party	Candidate	Votes	%	±%
CPNP	Patrick Kerwin	4,204	57.0	+8.5
Labor	Peter McLachlan	3,177	43.0	−8.5
Total formal votes		7,381	99.0	−0.2
Informal votes		73	1.0	+0.2
Turnout		7,454	80.2	+1.2
CPNP gain from Labor		Swing	+8.5	

1926 Queensland state election: Merthyr
Party	Candidate	Votes	%	±%
Labor	Peter McLachlan	3,666	51.5	−0.9
CPNP	Edwin Fowles	3,448	48.5	+0.9
Total formal votes		7,114	99.2	−0.4
Informal votes		54	0.8	+0.4
Turnout		7,168	79.0	−0.5
Labor hold		Swing	−0.9	

1923 Queensland state election: Merthyr
Party	Candidate	Votes	%	±%
Labor	Peter McLachlan	3,509	52.4	+4.0
United	Peter MacGregor	3,189	47.6	−4.0
Total formal votes		6,698	99.6	+0.1
Informal votes		28	0.4	−0.1
Turnout		6,726	79.5	+7.5
Labor gain from United		Swing	+4.0	

1920 Queensland state election: Merthyr
Party	Candidate	Votes	%	±%
National	Peter MacGregor	3,213	51.6	+4.3
Labor	Peter McLachlan	3,013	48.4	−4.3
Total formal votes		6,226	99.5	+0.1
Informal votes		28	0.5	−0.1
Turnout		6,254	72.0	−11.6
National gain from Labor		Swing	+4.3	

=== Elections in the 1910s ===
1918 Queensland state election: Merthyr
Party	Candidate	Votes	%	±%
Labor	Peter McLachlan	3,090	52.7	−4.6
National	Peter MacGregor	2,776	47.3	+4.6
Total formal votes		5,866	99.4	0.0
Informal votes		33	0.6	0.0
Turnout		5,899	83.6	−8.1
Labor hold		Swing	−4.6	

1915 Queensland state election: Merthyr
Party	Candidate	Votes	%	±%
Labor	Peter McLachlan	2,881	57.3	+7.4
Liberal	John Lackey	2,144	42.7	−7.4
Total formal votes		5,025	99.4	+0.5
Informal votes		29	0.6	−0.5
Turnout		5,054	91.7	+6.2
Labor gain from Liberal		Swing	+7.4	

1912 Queensland state election: Merthyr
Party	Candidate	Votes	%	±%
Liberal	Thomas Welsby	2,119	50.05	
Labor	Peter McLachlan	2,115	49.95	
Total formal votes		4,234	98.9	
Informal votes		47	1.1	
Turnout		4,281	85.5	
Liberal hold		Swing		
