= Electoral results for the district of Clayfield =

Queensland, Australia, district election results

This is a list of electoral results for the electoral district of Clayfield in Queensland state elections.

== Members for Clayfield ==
First incarnation (1950–1977)
| Member | Party | Term |
|---|---|---|
| Harold Taylor | Liberal | 1950–1963 |
| John Murray | Liberal | 1963–1976 |
| Ivan Brown | Liberal | 1976–1977 |
Second incarnation (1992–present)
| Member | Party | Term |
| Santo Santoro | Liberal | 1992–2001 |
| Liddy Clark | Labor | 2001–2006 |
| Tim Nicholls | Liberal | 2006–2008 |
| Tim Nicholls | Liberal National | 2008–present |

== Election results ==
=== Elections in the 2020s ===
2024 Queensland state election: Clayfield
| Party | Candidate | Votes | % | ±% |
|---|---|---|---|---|
| Liberal National | Tim Nicholls | 17,591 | 47.37 | +1.48 |
| Labor | Belle Brookfield | 10,905 | 29.37 | −2.67 |
| Greens | Jaimyn Mayer | 6,490 | 17.48 | −0.13 |
| One Nation | Michelle Wilde | 1,202 | 3.24 | +0.89 |
| Libertarian | Nick Buick | 943 | 2.54 | +2.54 |
| Total formal votes | | 37,131 | 98.00 | +0.02 |
| Informal votes | | 758 | 2.00 | −0.02 |
| Turnout | | 37,889 | 89.36 | +1.00 |
Two-party-preferred result
| Liberal National | Tim Nicholls | 19,881 | 53.54 | +1.99 |
| Labor | Belle Brookfield | 17,250 | 46.46 | −1.99 |
| Liberal National hold | | Swing | +1.99 | |

2020 Queensland state election: Clayfield
| Party | Candidate | Votes | % | ±% |
|---|---|---|---|---|
| Liberal National | Tim Nicholls | 15,979 | 45.89 | −1.94 |
| Labor | Philip Anthony | 11,157 | 32.04 | −0.84 |
| Greens | Andrew Bartlett | 6,132 | 17.61 | −1.67 |
| One Nation | Abby Douglas | 817 | 2.35 | +2.35 |
| Independent Liberal Democrat | Robert King | 478 | 1.37 | +1.37 |
| Civil Liberties & Motorists | Kathy Moloney | 254 | 0.73 | +0.73 |
| Total formal votes | | 34,817 | 97.98 | +1.74 |
| Informal votes | | 719 | 2.02 | −1.74 |
| Turnout | | 35,536 | 88.36 | +1.60 |
Two-party-preferred result
| Liberal National | Tim Nicholls | 17,949 | 51.55 | −0.86 |
| Labor | Philip Anthony | 16,868 | 48.45 | +0.86 |
| Liberal National hold | | Swing | −0.86 | |

=== Elections in the 2010s ===
2017 Queensland state election: Clayfield
| Party | Candidate | Votes | % | ±% |
|---|---|---|---|---|
| Liberal National | Tim Nicholls | 15,359 | 47.8 | −4.8 |
| Labor | Philip Anthony | 10,559 | 32.9 | +0.6 |
| Greens | Claire Ogden | 6,190 | 19.3 | +7.3 |
| Total formal votes | | 32,108 | 96.2 | −2.2 |
| Informal votes | | 1,256 | 3.8 | +2.2 |
| Turnout | | 33,364 | 86.8 | +1.6 |
Two-party-preferred result
| Liberal National | Tim Nicholls | 16,829 | 52.4 | −4.2 |
| Labor | Philip Anthony | 15,279 | 47.6 | +4.2 |
| Liberal National hold | | Swing | −4.2 | |

2015 Queensland state election: Clayfield
| Party | Candidate | Votes | % | ±% |
|---|---|---|---|---|
| Liberal National | Tim Nicholls | 16,113 | 52.89 | −9.44 |
| Labor | John Martin | 9,769 | 32.07 | +10.47 |
| Greens | Anthony Pink | 3,393 | 11.14 | +0.30 |
| Independent | Katrina MacDonald | 1,188 | 3.90 | +3.90 |
| Total formal votes | | 30,463 | 98.39 | +0.02 |
| Informal votes | | 498 | 1.61 | −0.02 |
| Turnout | | 30,961 | 89.38 | −1.93 |
Two-party-preferred result
| Liberal National | Tim Nicholls | 16,735 | 57.21 | −13.35 |
| Labor | John Martin | 12,515 | 42.79 | +13.35 |
| Liberal National hold | | Swing | −13.35 | |

2012 Queensland state election: Clayfield
| Party | Candidate | Votes | % | ±% |
|---|---|---|---|---|
| Liberal National | Tim Nicholls | 17,648 | 62.33 | +13.09 |
| Labor | Brent Davidson | 6,115 | 21.60 | −14.94 |
| Greens | Luke Morey | 3,068 | 10.84 | +0.17 |
| Katter's Australian | Will Keenan | 1,483 | 5.24 | +5.24 |
| Total formal votes | | 28,314 | 98.37 | −0.28 |
| Informal votes | | 470 | 1.63 | +0.28 |
| Turnout | | 28,784 | 91.30 | +0.14 |
Two-party-preferred result
| Liberal National | Tim Nicholls | 18,597 | 70.56 | +14.72 |
| Labor | Brent Davidson | 7,760 | 29.44 | −14.72 |
| Liberal National hold | | Swing | +14.72 | |

=== Elections in the 2000s ===
2009 Queensland state election: Clayfield
| Party | Candidate | Votes | % | ±% |
|---|---|---|---|---|
| Liberal National | Tim Nicholls | 13,784 | 49.2 | +5.1 |
| Labor | Joff Lelliott | 10,230 | 36.5 | −4.7 |
| Greens | Andrew Jeremijenko | 2,988 | 10.7 | −0.1 |
| DS4SEQ | Randle Thomas | 560 | 2.0 | +2.0 |
| Family First | Brendan Wong | 433 | 1.5 | +1.5 |
| Total formal votes | | 27,995 | 98.5 | |
| Informal votes | | 384 | 1.5 | |
| Turnout | | 28,379 | 91.2 | |
Two-party-preferred result
| Liberal National | Tim Nicholls | 14,738 | 55.8 | +6.1 |
| Labor | Joff Lelliott | 11,656 | 44.2 | −6.1 |
| Liberal National hold | | Swing | +6.1 | |

2006 Queensland state election: Clayfield
| Party | Candidate | Votes | % | ±% |
|---|---|---|---|---|
| Liberal | Tim Nicholls | 10,847 | 46.2 | +1.1 |
| Labor | Liddy Clark | 9,335 | 39.7 | −5.5 |
| Greens | Justin Wells | 2,419 | 10.3 | +2.7 |
| Independent | Brad Gradwell | 720 | 3.1 | +3.1 |
| Independent | Erik Eriksen | 171 | 0.7 | +0.7 |
| Total formal votes | | 23,492 | 98.5 | +0.0 |
| Informal votes | | 357 | 1.5 | −0.0 |
| Turnout | | 25,814 | 89.1 | −1.2 |
Two-party-preferred result
| Liberal | Tim Nicholls | 11,553 | 51.7 | +2.9 |
| Labor | Liddy Clark | 10,806 | 48.3 | −2.9 |
| Liberal gain from Labor | | Swing | +2.9 | |

2004 Queensland state election: Clayfield
| Party | Candidate | Votes | % | ±% |
|---|---|---|---|---|
| Labor | Liddy Clark | 10,633 | 45.2 | −0.7 |
| Liberal | Sally Hannah | 10,598 | 45.1 | +2.9 |
| Greens | Peter Thomas | 1,787 | 7.6 | +2.4 |
| Independent | Robyn McGee | 491 | 2.1 | +2.1 |
| Total formal votes | | 23,509 | 98.5 | +0.1 |
| Informal votes | | 358 | 1.5 | −0.1 |
| Turnout | | 23,867 | 90.3 | −1.7 |
Two-party-preferred result
| Labor | Liddy Clark | 11,611 | 51.2 | −0.8 |
| Liberal | Sally Hannah | 11,078 | 48.8 | +0.8 |
| Labor hold | | Swing | −0.8 | |

2001 Queensland state election: Clayfield
| Party | Candidate | Votes | % | ±% |
|---|---|---|---|---|
| Labor | Liddy Clark | 10,839 | 45.9 | +5.6 |
| Liberal | Santo Santoro | 9,948 | 42.2 | −7.3 |
| Independent | Robert Brittan | 1,582 | 6.7 | +6.7 |
| Greens | Marit Hegge | 1,228 | 5.2 | +1.3 |
| Total formal votes | | 23,597 | 98.4 | |
| Informal votes | | 394 | 1.6 | |
| Turnout | | 23,991 | 92.0 | |
Two-party-preferred result
| Labor | Liddy Clark | 11,593 | 52.0 | +6.5 |
| Liberal | Santo Santoro | 10,708 | 48.0 | −6.5 |
| Labor gain from Liberal | | Swing | +6.5 | |

=== Elections in the 1990s ===
1998 Queensland state election: Clayfield
| Party | Candidate | Votes | % | ±% |
|---|---|---|---|---|
| Liberal | Santo Santoro | 10,107 | 52.6 | −7.5 |
| Labor | Liddy Clark | 7,498 | 39.0 | +5.4 |
| Greens | Malcolm Lewis | 871 | 4.5 | +4.5 |
| Democrats | Michael Brown | 756 | 3.9 | −2.4 |
| Total formal votes | | 19,232 | 98.3 | −0.3 |
| Informal votes | | 331 | 1.7 | +0.3 |
| Turnout | | 19,563 | 92.0 | +0.8 |
Two-party-preferred result
| Liberal | Santo Santoro | 10,481 | 56.5 | −7.6 |
| Labor | Liddy Clark | 8,054 | 43.5 | +7.6 |
| Liberal hold | | Swing | −7.6 | |

1995 Queensland state election: Clayfield
| Party | Candidate | Votes | % | ±% |
|---|---|---|---|---|
| Liberal | Santo Santoro | 11,521 | 60.0 | +8.9 |
| Labor | Dennis Williams | 6,445 | 33.6 | −9.6 |
| Democrats | James Leddy | 1,224 | 6.4 | +6.4 |
| Total formal votes | | 19,190 | 98.6 | +0.5 |
| Informal votes | | 277 | 1.4 | −0.5 |
| Turnout | | 19,467 | 91.2 | |
Two-party-preferred result
| Liberal | Santo Santoro | 12,073 | 64.2 | +10.1 |
| Labor | Dennis Williams | 6,742 | 35.8 | −10.1 |
| Liberal hold | | Swing | +10.1 | |

1992 Queensland state election: Clayfield
| Party | Candidate | Votes | % | ±% |
|---|---|---|---|---|
| Liberal | Santo Santoro | 10,178 | 51.1 | +11.1 |
| Labor | Dennis Williams | 8,609 | 43.2 | −5.9 |
| Independent | Peter Dove | 565 | 2.8 | +2.8 |
| Indigenous Peoples | Darby McCarthy | 561 | 2.8 | +2.8 |
| Total formal votes | | 19,913 | 98.0 | |
| Informal votes | | 395 | 2.0 | |
| Turnout | | 20,308 | 91.1 | |
Two-party-preferred result
| Liberal | Santo Santoro | 10,602 | 54.1 | +4.1 |
| Labor | Dennis Williams | 9,004 | 45.9 | −4.1 |
| Liberal gain from Labor | | Swing | +4.1 | |

=== Elections in the 1970s ===
1974 Queensland state election: Clayfield
| Party | Candidate | Votes | % | ±% |
|---|---|---|---|---|
| Liberal | John Murray | 7,619 | 63.3 | +16.1 |
| Labor | John Stephens | 3,701 | 30.7 | −9.7 |
| Queensland Labor | Francis Andrews | 722 | 6.0 | −6.5 |
| Total formal votes | | 12,042 | 98.5 | +0.3 |
| Informal votes | | 186 | 1.5 | −0.3 |
| Turnout | | 12,228 | 86.0 | −5.8 |
Two-party-preferred result
| Liberal | John Murray | 8,253 | 68.5 | +10.3 |
| Labor | John Stephens | 3,789 | 31.5 | −10.3 |
| Liberal hold | | Swing | +10.3 | |

1972 Queensland state election: Clayfield
| Party | Candidate | Votes | % | ±% |
|---|---|---|---|---|
| Liberal | John Murray | 5,215 | 47.2 | −4.4 |
| Labor | John Stephens | 4,459 | 40.4 | +4.0 |
| Queensland Labor | Francis Andrews | 1,378 | 12.5 | +0.5 |
| Total formal votes | | 11,052 | 98.2 | |
| Informal votes | | 199 | 1.8 | |
| Turnout | | 11,251 | 91.8 | |
Two-party-preferred result
| Liberal | John Murray | 6,436 | 58.2 | −4.7 |
| Labor | John Stephens | 4,616 | 41.8 | +4.7 |
| Liberal hold | | Swing | −4.7 | |

=== Elections in the 1960s ===
1969 Queensland state election: Clayfield
| Party | Candidate | Votes | % | ±% |
|---|---|---|---|---|
| Liberal | John Murray | 5,064 | 51.6 | −4.6 |
| Labor | David Hunter | 3,578 | 36.4 | +3.2 |
| Queensland Labor | Francis Andrews | 1,178 | 12.0 | +1.4 |
| Total formal votes | | 9,820 | 98.5 | +0.7 |
| Informal votes | | 154 | 1.5 | −0.7 |
| Turnout | | 9,974 | 89.6 | −2.8 |
Two-party-preferred result
| Liberal | John Murray | 5,919 | 60.3 | −4.6 |
| Labor | David Hunter | 3,901 | 39.7 | +4.6 |
| Liberal hold | | Swing | −4.6 | |

1966 Queensland state election: Clayfield
| Party | Candidate | Votes | % | ±% |
|---|---|---|---|---|
| Liberal | John Murray | 5,688 | 56.2 | +0.3 |
| Labor | Bruce Strachan | 3,356 | 33.2 | −0.6 |
| Queensland Labor | Mary Ryan | 1,074 | 10.6 | +0.3 |
| Total formal votes | | 10,118 | 97.8 | −0.8 |
| Informal votes | | 222 | 2.2 | +0.8 |
| Turnout | | 10,340 | 92.4 | −2.1 |
Two-party-preferred result
| Liberal | John Murray | 6,562 | 64.9 | +0.6 |
| Labor | Bruce Strachan | 3,556 | 35.1 | −0.6 |
| Liberal hold | | Swing | +0.6 | |

1963 Queensland state election: Clayfield
| Party | Candidate | Votes | % | ±% |
|---|---|---|---|---|
| Liberal | John Murray | 5,907 | 55.9 | +1.6 |
| Labor | Norm Butler | 3,566 | 33.8 | +6.1 |
| Queensland Labor | Jack Dolan | 1,085 | 10.3 | −7.7 |
| Total formal votes | | 10,558 | 98.6 | +0.2 |
| Informal votes | | 152 | 1.4 | −0.2 |
| Turnout | | 10,710 | 94.5 | +2.6 |
Two-party-preferred result
| Liberal | John Murray | 6,790 | 64.3 | |
| Labor | Norm Butler | 3,768 | 35.7 | |
| Liberal hold | | Swing | N/A | |

1960 Queensland state election: Clayfield
| Party | Candidate | Votes | % | ±% |
|---|---|---|---|---|
| Liberal | Harold Taylor | 5,905 | 54.3 | |
| Labor | Edgar Abel | 3,015 | 27.7 | |
| Queensland Labor | Harry Wright | 1,953 | 18.0 | |
| Total formal votes | | 10,873 | 98.4 | |
| Informal votes | | 172 | 1.6 | |
| Turnout | | 11,045 | 91.9 | |
| Liberal hold | | Swing | | |

=== Elections in the 1950s ===
1957 Queensland state election: Clayfield
| Party | Candidate | Votes | % | ±% |
|---|---|---|---|---|
| Liberal | Harold Taylor | 7,447 | 78.3 | +4.3 |
| Independent | James Ryan | 2,065 | 21.7 | −4.3 |
| Total formal votes | | 9,512 | 97.2 | −0.2 |
| Informal votes | | 275 | 2.8 | +0.2 |
| Turnout | | 9,787 | 93.1 | −2.9 |
| Liberal hold | | Swing | +4.3 | |

1956 Queensland state election: Clayfield
| Party | Candidate | Votes | % | ±% |
|---|---|---|---|---|
| Liberal | Harold Taylor | 6,888 | 74.0 | −26.0 |
| Independent | James Ryan | 2,420 | 26.0 | +26.0 |
| Total formal votes | | 9,308 | 97.4 | |
| Informal votes | | 244 | 2.6 | |
| Turnout | | 9,552 | 90.2 | |
| Liberal hold | | Swing | N/A | |

1953 Queensland state election: Clayfield
| Party | Candidate | Votes | % | ±% |
|---|---|---|---|---|
| Liberal | Harold Taylor | unopposed | | |
| Liberal hold | | Swing | | |

1950 Queensland state election: Clayfield
| Party | Candidate | Votes | % | ±% |
|---|---|---|---|---|
| Liberal | Harold Taylor | 7,459 | 74.6 | |
| Labor | Edmund Roberts | 2,539 | 25.4 | |
| Total formal votes | | 9,998 | 99.3 | |
| Informal votes | | 70 | 0.7 | |
| Turnout | | 10,068 | 91.7 | |
| Liberal hold | | Swing | | |
