= Results of the 1972 Queensland state election =

Queensland state election, 27 May 1972 Legislative Assembly << 1969–1974 >>
Enrolled voters	997,489				
Votes cast	921,763		Turnout	92.41%	+0.64%
Informal votes	15,566		Informal	1.61%	–0.18%
Summary of votes by party
Party	Primary votes	%	Swing	Seats	Change
Labor	424,002	46.75%	+1.76%	33	+2
Liberal	201,596	22.23%	–1.45%	21	+2
Country	181,404	20.00%	–1.02%	26	±0
Queensland Labor	69,757	7.69%	+0.46%	0	–1
Independent	30,187	3.33%	+0.48%	2	+1
Total	906,946			82	

This is a list of electoral district results for the 1972 Queensland state election.

In seats where preferences were not distributed, the two-party majority figures given here are estimates only. Likewise, since this election followed a redistribution, figures for changes in party votes from the 1969 election are also estimates.

== Results by electoral district ==
=== Albert ===
1972 Queensland state election: Albert
Party	Candidate	Votes	%	±%
Labor	Bill D'Arcy	6,781	50.5	+30.9
Country	Ivan Gibbs	3,876	28.8	−21.8
Liberal	Robert Allen	2,183	16.2	+3.3
Queensland Labor	Thomas McKenzie	357	2.7	+0.1
Independent	John Black	141	1.1	+1.1
Independent	William Wollstein	101	0.8	+0.8
Total formal votes		13,439	97.7	
Informal votes		319	2.3	
Turnout		13,758	89.7	
Two-party-preferred result
Labor	Bill D'Arcy	7,268	54.1	+23.3
Country	Ivan Gibbs	6,171	45.9	−23.3
Labor gain from Country		Swing	+23.3	

=== Archerfield ===
1972 Queensland state election: Archerfield
Party	Candidate	Votes	%	±%
Labor	Kevin Hooper	8,075	71.8	
Liberal	Cyril Morgan	2,179	19.4	
Queensland Labor	Barry Weedon	933	8.8	
Total formal votes		11,247	97.4	
Informal votes		294	2.6	
Turnout		11,541	92.2	
Two-party-preferred result
Labor	Kevin Hooper	8,243	73.3	+1.8
Liberal	Cyril Morgan	3,004	26.7	−1.8
Labor hold		Swing	+1.8	

=== Ashgrove ===
1972 Queensland state election: Ashgrove
Party	Candidate	Votes	%	±%
Labor	Walter Tutt	4,597	39.5	−5.1
Liberal	Douglas Tooth	3,525	30.3	−15.3
Independent	Ivan Alcorn	2,507	21.5	+21.5
Queensland Labor	Bert Vann	1,019	8.7	−1.1
Total formal votes		11,648	99.0	
Informal votes		121	1.0	
Turnout		11,769	93.1	
Two-party-preferred result
Liberal	Douglas Tooth	6,378	54.8	−3.0
Labor	Walter Tutt	5,270	45.2	+3.0
Liberal hold		Swing	−3.0	

=== Aspley ===
1972 Queensland state election: Aspley
Party	Candidate	Votes	%	±%
Liberal	Fred Campbell	6,169	51.3	+2.9
Labor	John Steensen	4,841	40.3	−2.5
Queensland Labor	Noel Hutchinson	1,003	8.4	−0.4
Total formal votes		12,013	99.0	
Informal votes		124	1.0	
Turnout		12,137	94.2	
Two-party-preferred result
Liberal	Fred Campbell	7,002	58.3	+0.1
Labor	John Steensen	5,011	41.7	−0.1
Liberal hold		Swing	+0.1	

=== Auburn ===
1972 Queensland state election: Auburn
Party	Candidate	Votes	%	±%
Country	Neville Hewitt	4,890	51.3	
Labor	Roden Carter	3,071	35.1	
Queensland Labor	Lindsay Sharpe	782	8.9	
Total formal votes		8,743	98.9	
Informal votes		95	1.1	
Turnout		8,838	93.1	
Two-party-preferred result
Country	Neville Hewitt	5,540	63.4	+0.3
Labor	Roden Carter	3,203	36.6	−0.3
Country hold		Swing	+0.3	

=== Balonne ===
1972 Queensland state election: Balonne
Party	Candidate	Votes	%	±%
Country	Don Neal	3,132	51.3	−8.1
Labor	Bob Drenan	1,768	28.9	−11.7
Queensland Labor	John Donnelly	814	13.3	+13.3
Independent	William Dendle	395	6.5	+6.5
Total formal votes		6,109	99.1	
Informal votes		58	0.9	
Turnout		6,167	89.8	
Two-party-preferred result
Country	Don Neal	4,006	65.6	+6.2
Labor	Bob Drenan	2,103	34.3	−6.2
Country hold		Swing	+6.2	

=== Barambah ===
1972 Queensland state election: Barambah
Party	Candidate	Votes	%	±%
Country	Joh Bjelke-Petersen	6,249	67.4	−10.3
Labor	Neville Reinke	2,210	23.8	+1.5
Queensland Labor	Mary Ryan	541	5.8	+5.8
Independent	Percy Edwards	272	2.9	+2.9
Total formal votes		9,272	99.0	
Informal votes		97	1.0	
Turnout		9,369	95.7	
Two-party-preferred result
Country	Joh Bjelke-Petersen	6,835	73.7	−4.0
Labor	Neville Reinke	2,437	26.3	+4.0
Country hold		Swing	−4.0	

=== Baroona ===
1972 Queensland state election: Baroona
Party	Candidate	Votes	%	±%
Labor	Pat Hanlon	7,110	62.6	−1.2
Liberal	John Andrews	3,184	28.0	+1.7
Queensland Labor	Maurice O'Connor	1,073	9.4	−0.5
Total formal votes		11,367	97.3	
Informal votes		318	2.7	
Turnout		11,685	90.5	
Two-party-preferred result
Labor	Pat Hanlon	7,291	64.1	+0.9
Liberal	John Andrews	4,076	35.9	−0.9
Labor hold		Swing	+0.9	

=== Barron River ===
1972 Queensland state election: Barron River
Party	Candidate	Votes	%	±%
Labor	Bill Wood	6,507	52.3	
Country	Micheli Borzi	5,066	40.7	
Liberal	Rex Silver	443	3.6	
Queensland Labor	Thomas White	428	3.4	
Total formal votes		12,444	98.5	
Informal votes		191	1.5	
Turnout		12,635	91.3	
Two-party-preferred result
Labor	Bill Wood	6,641	53.4	−3.7
Country	Micheli Borzi	5,803	46.6	+3.7
Labor hold		Swing	−3.7	

=== Belmont ===
1972 Queensland state election: Belmont
Party	Candidate	Votes	%	±%
Labor	Fred Newton	7,350	63.9	+6.4
Liberal	Maurice Hughes	3,229	28.1	−6.3
Queensland Labor	Thomas Connor	924	8.0	+0.9
Total formal votes		11,503	98.5	
Informal votes		169	1.5	
Turnout		11,672	94.4	
Two-party-preferred result
Labor	Fred Newton	7,463	64.9	+3.8
Liberal	Maurice Hughes	4,040	35.1	−3.8
Labor hold		Swing	+3.8	

=== Belyando ===
1972 Queensland state election: Belyando
Party	Candidate	Votes	%	±%
Labor	Eugene O'Donnell	4,213	51.3	−1.1
Country	Vince Lester	4,003	48.7	+1.1
Total formal votes		8,216	98.6	
Informal votes		116	1.4	
Turnout		8,332	89.7	
Labor hold		Swing	−1.1	

=== Brisbane ===
1972 Queensland state election: Brisbane
Party	Candidate	Votes	%	±%
Labor	Brian Davis	5,414	55.0	−1.2
Liberal	Harold Lowes	2,785	28.3	−1.4
Queensland Labor	Kenneth Walpole	1,088	11.1	−3.0
Independent	Llewellyn Davies	549	5.7	+5.7
Total formal votes		9,836	96.6	
Informal votes		342	3.4	
Turnout		10,178	90.2	
Two-party-preferred result
Labor	Brian Davis	5,873	59.7	0.0
Liberal	Harold Lowes	3,963	40.3	0.0
Labor hold		Swing	0.0	

=== Bulimba ===
1972 Queensland state election: Bulimba
Party	Candidate	Votes	%	±%
Labor	Jack Houston	7,446	64.0	
Liberal	Megan Wilding	3,098	26.6	
Queensland Labor	Paul Tucker	1,081	9.3	
Total formal votes		11,625	98.6	
Informal votes		165	1.4	
Turnout		11,790	94.1	
Two-party-preferred result
Labor	Jack Houston	7,629	65.6	+6.2
Liberal	Megan Wilding	3,996	34.4	−6.2
Labor hold		Swing	+6.2	

=== Bundaberg ===
1972 Queensland state election: Bundaberg
Party	Candidate	Votes	%	±%
Labor	Lou Jensen	6,940	68.9	+19.4
Queensland Labor	Alan Birchley	3,128	31.1	+28.4
Total formal votes		10,068	98.2	
Informal votes		185	1.8	
Turnout		10,253	92.9	
Labor hold		Swing	+10.6	

=== Burdekin ===
1972 Queensland state election: Burdekin
Party	Candidate	Votes	%	±%
Country	Val Bird	4,883	54.4	+22.5
Labor	Ronald Nuttall	3,568	39.8	−1.7
Queensland Labor	Emil Liebrecht	518	5.8	−1.9
Total formal votes		7,245	96.6	
Informal votes		252	3.4	
Turnout		7,497	93.0	
Two-party-preferred result
Country	Val Bird	5,313	59.2	+6.2
Labor	Ronald Nuttall	3,656	40.8	−6.2
Country hold		Swing	+6.2	

=== Burnett ===
1972 Queensland state election: Burnett
Party	Candidate	Votes	%	±%
Country	Claude Wharton	6,383	65.9	+0.6
Labor	Granville Batkines	2,772	28.6	−6.1
Queensland Labor	Leonard Galligan	535	5.5	+5.5
Total formal votes		9,690	98.7	
Informal votes		132	1.3	
Turnout		9,822	91.7	
Two-party-preferred result
Country	Claude Wharton	6,828	70.5	+5.2
Labor	Granville Batkines	2,862	29.5	−5.2
Country hold		Swing	+5.2	

=== Cairns ===
1972 Queensland state election: Cairns
Party	Candidate	Votes	%	±%
Labor	Ray Jones	8,160	66.5	+6.4
Country	Arthur Kalman	2,230	18.2	+1.5
Liberal	David Palmer	1,003	8.2	−5.9
Queensland Labor	Bernard Marsh	887	7.2	+3.5
Total formal votes		12,280	98.3	
Informal votes		208	1.7	
Turnout		12,488	90.3	
Two-party-preferred result
Labor	Ray Jones	8,450	68.8	+4.1
Country	Arthur Kalman	3,830	31.2	−4.1
Labor hold		Swing	+4.1	

=== Callide ===
1972 Queensland state election: Callide
Party	Candidate	Votes	%	±%
Country	Lindsay Hartwig	4,682	50.3	+7.1
Labor	Charles Tutt	3,511	37.7	+1.2
Queensland Labor	Edgar Lanigan	1,118	12.0	+1.9
Total formal votes		9,311	98.6	
Informal votes		135	1.4	
Turnout		9,446	93.9	
Two-party-preferred result
Country	Lindsay Hartwig	5,611	60.3	+3.5
Labor	Charles Tutt	3,700	39.7	−3.5
Country hold		Swing	+3.5	

=== Carnarvon ===
1972 Queensland state election: Carnarvon
Party	Candidate	Votes	%	±%
Country	Henry McKechnie	4,180	49.2	−7.2
Labor	Neil Sullivan	3,652	43.0	+10.5
Queensland Labor	Raymond Macnamara	655	7.7	−3.3
Total formal votes		8,487	98.7	
Informal votes		107	1.3	
Turnout		8,594	93.1	
Two-party-preferred result
Country	Henry McKechnie	4,745	55.9	−8.5
Labor	Neil Sullivan	3,742	44.1	+8.5
Country hold		Swing	−8.5	

=== Chatsworth ===
1972 Queensland state election: Chatsworth
Party	Candidate	Votes	%	±%
Liberal	Bill Hewitt	5,658	48.8	−4.0
Labor	H. Zehr	5,095	43.9	+3.9
Queensland Labor	Maurice Sheehan	845	7.3	+0.1
Total formal votes		11,598	98.7	
Informal votes		158	1.3	
Turnout		11,756	93.9	
Two-party-preferred result
Liberal	Bill Hewitt	6,391	55.1	−3.1
Labor	H. Zehr	5,207	44.9	+3.1
Liberal hold		Swing	−3.1	

=== Clayfield ===
1972 Queensland state election: Clayfield
Party	Candidate	Votes	%	±%
Liberal	John Murray	5,215	47.2	−4.4
Labor	John Stephens	4,459	40.4	+4.0
Queensland Labor	Francis Andrews	1,378	12.5	+0.5
Total formal votes		11,052	98.2	
Informal votes		199	1.8	
Turnout		11,251	91.8	
Two-party-preferred result
Liberal	John Murray	6,436	58.2	−4.7
Labor	John Stephens	4,616	41.8	+4.7
Liberal hold		Swing	−4.7	

=== Condamine ===
1972 Queensland state election: Condamine
Party	Candidate	Votes	%	±%
Country	Vic Sullivan	4,561	43.6	−29.7
Independent	Charles Russell	2,991	28.6	+28.6
Labor	Gladys Krause	1,759	16.8	−9.9
Queensland Labor	William Hickey	1,154	11.0	+11.0
Total formal votes		10,465	99.2	
Informal votes		84	0.8	
Turnout		10,549	93.0	
Two-party-preferred result
Country	Vic Sullivan	7,708	73.7	+0.4
Labor	Gladys Krause	2,757	26.3	−0.4
Two-candidate-preferred result
Country	Vic Sullivan	5,426	51.8	−21.5
Independent	Charles Russell	5,039	48.2	+48.2
Country hold		Swing	−21.5	

=== Cook ===
1972 Queensland state election: Cook
Party	Candidate	Votes	%	±%
Labor	Edwin Wallis-Smith	3,071	50.8	−2.1
Country	Graham Gordon	1,749	28.9	−10.6
Queensland Labor	Benjamin Nona	1,221	20.2	+18.3
Total formal votes		6,041	96.9	
Informal votes		194	3.1	
Turnout		6,235	84.5	
Two-party-preferred result
Labor	Edwin Wallis-Smith	3,277	54.2	+0.9
Country	Graham Gordon	2,764	45.8	−0.9
Labor hold		Swing	+0.9	

=== Cooroora ===
1972 Queensland state election: Cooroora
Party	Candidate	Votes	%	±%
Country	David Low	7,126	60.4	−1.7
Labor	Anthony Dames	3,785	32.1	+1.7
Queensland Labor	Alexander Browne	878	7.5	0.0
Total formal votes		11,789	98.7	
Informal votes		149	1.3	
Turnout		11,938	92.2	
Two-party-preferred result
Country	David Low	7,758	65.8	−1.7
Labor	Anthony Dames	4,031	34.2	+1.7
Country hold		Swing	−1.7	

=== Cunningham ===
1972 Queensland state election: Cunningham
Party	Candidate	Votes	%	±%
Country	Alan Fletcher	6,195	58.5	−0.6
Labor	Brian Graham	2,232	21.1	−7.8
Queensland Labor	Eugene Connolly	2,166	20.4	+8.4
Total formal votes		10,593	99.3	
Informal votes		70	0.7	
Turnout		10,663	95.0	
Two-party-preferred result
Country	Alan Fletcher	8,097	76.4	+3.8
Labor	Brian Graham	2,496	23.6	−3.8
Country hold		Swing	+3.8	

=== Everton ===
1972 Queensland state election: Everton
Party	Candidate	Votes	%	±%
Labor	Gerry Jones	5,835	53.6	−6.3
Liberal	Denver Beanland	2,553	23.5	−7.6
Country	Fred Roberts	1,341	12.3	+12.3
Queensland Labor	Lyle Jehn	787	7.2	−1.8
Independent	Theoron Toon	366	3.4	+3.4
Total formal votes		10,882	98.0	
Informal votes		218	2.0	
Turnout		11,100	94.1	
Two-party-preferred result
Labor	Gerry Jones	6,339	58.3	−3.1
Liberal	Denver Beanland	4,543	41.7	+3.1
Labor hold		Swing	−3.1	

=== Fassifern ===
1972 Queensland state election: Fassifern
Party	Candidate	Votes	%	±%
Country	Selwyn Muller	6,867	55.6	−2.2
Labor	Murray Freiberg	3,983	32.2	−1.7
Queensland Labor	Luke O'Reilly	1,508	12.2	+5.9
Total formal votes		12,358	98.8	
Informal votes		151	1.2	
Turnout		12,509	92.7	
Two-party-preferred result
Country	Selwyn Muller	8,120	65.7	+0.5
Labor	Murray Freiberg	4,238	34.3	−0.5
Country hold		Swing	+0.5	

=== Flinders ===
1972 Queensland state election: Flinders
Party	Candidate	Votes	%	±%
Country	Bill Longeran	4,010	59.7	+5.1
Labor	Peter Lindenmayer	2,703	40.3	−5.1
Total formal votes		6,713	98.9	
Informal votes		74	1.1	
Turnout		6,787	87.3	
Country hold		Swing	+5.1	

=== Greenslopes ===
1972 Queensland state election: Greenslopes
Party	Candidate	Votes	%	±%
Liberal	Keith Hooper	5,566	48.8	−5.7
Labor	Lewis Wyvill	4,824	42.3	+6.7
Queensland Labor	Denis Cochran	871	7.6	−2.3
Independent	Lynn Aberdeen	137	1.2	+1.2
Total formal votes		11,398	98.5	
Informal votes		178	1.5	
Turnout		11,576	93.1	
Two-party-preferred result
Liberal	Keith Hooper	6,430	55.0	−9.3
Labor	Lewis Wyvill	4,968	45.0	+9.3
Liberal hold		Swing	−9.3	

=== Gregory ===
1972 Queensland state election: Gregory
Party	Candidate	Votes	%	±%
Country	Wally Rae	3,019	52.6	−7.8
Labor	Gordon Harding	2,725	47.4	+7.8
Total formal votes		5,744	99.1	
Informal votes		53	0.9	
Turnout		5,797	86.2	
Country hold		Swing	−7.8	

=== Gympie ===
1972 Queensland state election: Gympie
Party	Candidate	Votes	%	±%
Country	Max Hodges	5,407	53.7	−4.6
Labor	Alex Pringle	3,830	38.0	+6.9
Queensland Labor	Benedict Kehoe	572	5.7	+0.2
Independent	Cecil Rivers	260	2.6	−1.4
Total formal votes		9,611	98.1	
Informal votes		184	1.9	
Turnout		9,795	94.9	
Two-party-preferred result
Country	Max Hodges	6,012	59.7	+5.2
Labor	Alex Pringle	4,057	40.3	−5.2
Country hold		Swing	+5.2	

=== Hinchinbrook ===
1972 Queensland state election: Hinchinbrook
Party	Candidate	Votes	%	±%
Labor	James Byrne	4,162	44.6	+11.6
Country	Ted Row	3,777	40.4	−15.3
Queensland Labor	Peter Wood	1,399	15.0	+3.6
Total formal votes		9,338	98.1	
Informal votes		185	1.9	
Turnout		9,523	92.9	
Two-party-preferred result
Country	Ted Row	4,904	52.5	−13.1
Labor	James Byrne	4,434	47.5	+13.1
Country hold		Swing	−13.1	

=== Ipswich ===
1972 Queensland state election: Ipswich
Party	Candidate	Votes	%	±%
Labor	Phillip Dwyer	5,446	45.3	
Liberal	Llew Edwards	4,674	38.8	
Independent	Douglas Wood	951	7.9	
Queensland Labor	Francis Carroll	578	4.8	
Independent	David Laird	340	2.8	
Independent	Victor Robb	47	0.4	
Total formal votes		12,036	97.8	
Informal votes		271	2.2	
Turnout		12,307	93.1	
Two-party-preferred result
Liberal	Llew Edwards	6,159	51.2	+5.7
Labor	Phillip Dwyer	5,877	48.8	−5.7
Liberal gain from Labor		Swing	+5.7	

=== Ipswich West ===
1972 Queensland state election: Ipswich West
Party	Candidate	Votes	%	±%
Labor	Vi Jordan	6,781	57.9	+4.2
Liberal	Allan Whybird	2,806	24.0	−12.6
Independent	Robert Maxwell	1,233	10.5	+10.5
Queensland Labor	Ernest Devin	887	7.6	−2.2
Total formal votes		11,707	98.5	
Informal votes		174	1.5	
Turnout		11,881	91.9	
Two-party-preferred result
Labor	Vi Jordan	7,202	61.5	+6.2
Liberal	Allan Whybird	4,505	38.5	−6.2
Labor hold		Swing	+6.2	

=== Isis ===
1972 Queensland state election: Isis
Party	Candidate	Votes	%	±%
Labor	Jim Blake	7,062	55.3	+1.2
Country	Alfred Plath	3,441	26.9	−17.0
Liberal	Kenneth Murphy	1,777	13.9	+13.9
Independent	Eric Andrew	491	3.8	+3.8
Total formal votes		12,771	99.0	
Informal votes		124	1.0	
Turnout		12,895	94.1	
Two-party-preferred result
Labor	Jim Blake	7,448	58.3	+1.7
Country	Alfred Plath	5,323	41.7	−1.7
Labor hold		Swing	+1.7	

=== Ithaca ===
1972 Queensland state election: Ithaca
Party	Candidate	Votes	%	±%
Liberal	Col Miller	5,429	48.1	−1.7
Labor	Sylvester Martin	4,888	43.3	+1.6
Queensland Labor	Mervyn Eunson	964	8.6	+0.1
Total formal votes		11,281	98.4	
Informal votes		180	1.6	
Turnout		11,461	92.6	
Two-party-preferred result
Liberal	Col Miller	6,271	55.6	−2.4
Labor	Sylvester Martin	5,010	44.4	−2.4
Liberal hold		Swing	−2.4	

=== Kurilpa ===
1972 Queensland state election: Kurilpa
Party	Candidate	Votes	%	±%
Labor	Frank Gardiner	5,233	46.4	+3.3
Liberal	Clive Hughes	5,134	45.5	−3.6
Queensland Labor	Edward Doherty	811	7.2	−0.6
Independent	Michael Neenan	93	0.8	+0.8
Total formal votes		11,271	97.8	
Informal votes		256	2.2	
Turnout		11,527	91.5	
Two-party-preferred result
Liberal	Clive Hughes	5,809	51.5	−4.1
Labor	Frank Gardiner	5,462	48.5	+4.1
Liberal hold		Swing	−4.1	

=== Landsborough ===
1972 Queensland state election: Landsborough
Party	Candidate	Votes	%	±%
Country	Mike Ahern	7,016	54.3	−9.0
Labor	Roger Jeffries	3,802	29.4	+0.4
Liberal	David Barker	2,106	16.3	+16.3
Total formal votes		12,924	98.5	
Informal votes		190	1.5	
Turnout		13,114	92.7	
Two-party-preferred result
Country	Mike Ahern	8,490	65.7	−1.9
Labor	Roger Jeffries	4,434	34.3	+1.9
Country hold		Swing	−1.9	

=== Lockyer ===
1972 Queensland state election: Lockyer
Party	Candidate	Votes	%	±%
Liberal	Sir Gordon Chalk	7,217	62.2	−1.4
Labor	Lindesay Jones	4,380	37.8	+37.8
Total formal votes		11,597	98.3	
Informal votes		204	1.7	
Turnout		11,801	93.9	
Liberal hold		Swing	−1.7	

=== Lytton ===
1972 Queensland state election: Lytton
Party	Candidate	Votes	%	±%
Labor	Tom Burns	8,376	68.2	
Liberal	John Ottway	3,163	25.8	
Queensland Labor	John O'Connell	735	6.0	
Total formal votes		12,274	98.4	
Informal votes		200	1.6	
Turnout		12,474	94.7	
Two-party-preferred result
Labor	Tom Burns	8,500	69.3	+1.7
Liberal	John Ottway	3,774	30.7	−1.7
Labor hold		Swing	+1.7	

=== Mackay ===
1972 Queensland state election: Mackay
Party	Candidate	Votes	%	±%
Independent	Ed Casey	5,239	36.2	+36.2
Labor	John Breen	4,027	27.8	−30.9
Country	Charles Johnstone	3,717	25.7	+25.7
Liberal	Robert Gray	1,480	10.2	−27.5
Total formal votes		14,463	98.7	
Informal votes		190	1.3	
Turnout		14,653	92.6	
Two-candidate-preferred result
Independent	Ed Casey	9,167	63.4	+63.4
Labor	John Breen	5,296	36.6	−20.1
Independent gain from Labor		Swing	+63.4	

=== Mansfield ===
1972 Queensland state election: Mansfield
Party	Candidate	Votes	%	±%
Labor	Raymond Lynch	6,358	46.0	
Liberal	Bill Kaus	6,193	44.8	
Queensland Labor	John Thompson	1,094	7.9	
Independent	William Kenney	187	1.4	
Total formal votes		13,832	98.2	
Informal votes		251	1.8	
Turnout		14,083	94.1	
Two-party-preferred result
Liberal	Bill Kaus	7,198	52.0	+0.7
Labor	Raymond Lynch	6,634	48.0	−0.7
Liberal hold		Swing	+0.7	

=== Maryborough ===
1972 Queensland state election: Maryborough
Party	Candidate	Votes	%	±%
Liberal	Gilbert Alison	5,908	52.4	+14.5
Labor	Edward Weber	5,184	46.0	−10.5
Queensland Labor	Matthews Minnegal	186	1.6	−4.0
Total formal votes		11,278	99.1	
Informal votes		100	0.9	
Turnout		11,378	95.5	
Two-party-preferred result
Liberal	Gilbert Alison	6,063	53.8	+11.3
Labor	Edward Weber	5,215	46.2	−11.3
Liberal hold		Swing	+11.3	

=== Merthyr ===
1972 Queensland state election: Merthyr
Party	Candidate	Votes	%	±%
Liberal	Don Lane	5,369	52.2	+2.3
Labor	Denis Pie	4,058	39.5	−0.9
Queensland Labor	James Moss	849	8.3	−1.4
Total formal votes		10,276	97.8	
Informal votes		228	2.2	
Turnout		10,504	92.5	
Two-party-preferred result
Liberal	Don Lane	6,075	59.1	+2.5
Labor	Denis Pie	4,201	40.9	−2.5
Liberal hold		Swing	+2.5	

=== Mirani ===
1972 Queensland state election: Mirani
Party	Candidate	Votes	%	±%
Country	Tom Newbery	5,197	62.1	+7.9
Labor	Bernard Kirwan	3,172	37.9	−7.9
Total formal votes		8,369	98.8	
Informal votes		102	1.2	
Turnout		8,471	92.5	
Country hold		Swing	+7.9	

=== Mount Coot-tha ===
1972 Queensland state election: Mount Coot-tha
Party	Candidate	Votes	%	±%
Liberal	Bill Lickiss	6,880	56.6	−2.0
Labor	Ian De Lacy	3,893	32.1	+2.5
Queensland Labor	Cecilia Edwards	1,371	11.3	−0.4
Total formal votes		12,144	98.7	
Informal votes		163	1.3	
Turnout		12,307	91.2	
Two-party-preferred result
Liberal	Bill Lickiss	8,019	66.0	−3.2
Labor	Ian De Lacy	4,125	34.0	+3.2
Liberal hold		Swing	−3.2	

=== Mount Gravatt ===
1972 Queensland state election: Mount Gravatt
Party	Candidate	Votes	%	±%
Labor	Bill Avery	5,922	46.6	+5.7
Liberal	Geoff Chinchen	5,885	46.3	−6.0
Queensland Labor	Michael Scragg	901	7.1	+0.3
Total formal votes		12,708	98.8	
Informal votes		153	1.2	
Turnout		12,861	95.5	
Two-party-preferred result
Liberal	Geoff Chinchen	6,671	52.5	−4.1
Labor	Bill Avery	6,037	47.5	+4.1
Liberal hold		Swing	−4.1	

=== Mount Isa ===
1972 Queensland state election: Mount Isa
Party	Candidate	Votes	%	±%
Labor	Alec Inch	4,949	64.9	+6.4
Country	Lillian Noakes	2,964	26.5	−5.9
Queensland Labor	John Turner	957	8.6	+8.6
Total formal votes		11,184	97.1	
Informal votes		332	2.9	
Turnout		11,516	83.5	
Two-party-preferred result
Labor	Alec Inch	7,425	66.4	+3.4
Country	Lillian Oakes	3,759	33.6	−3.4
Labor hold		Swing	+3.4	

=== Mourilyan ===
1972 Queensland state election: Mourilyan
Party	Candidate	Votes	%	±%
Labor	Peter Moore	5,039	55.7	+2.4
Country	Peter Mitchell	2,949	32.6	−1.0
Queensland Labor	Geoffrey Higham	1,054	11.7	−1.5
Total formal votes		9,042	98.3	
Informal votes		160	1.7	
Turnout		9,202	91.4	
Two-party-preferred result
Labor	Peter Moore	5,169	57.2	+4.6
Country	Peter Mitchell	3,874	42.8	−4.6
Labor hold		Swing	+4.6	

=== Mulgrave ===
1972 Queensland state election: Mulgrave
Party	Candidate	Votes	%	±%
Country	Roy Armstrong	4,952	58.4	+3.7
Labor	Leslie Scheu	3,530	41.6	−3.7
Total formal votes		8,482	98.1	
Informal votes		161	1.9	
Turnout		8,643	92.6	
Country hold		Swing	+3.7	

=== Murrumba ===
1972 Queensland state election: Murrumba
Party	Candidate	Votes	%	±%
Labor	Alex Barr	6,138	46.3	+1.8
Country	Des Frawley	4,444	33.6	−14.7
Liberal	Kathleen Macadam	2,020	15.2	+15.2
Queensland Labor	Paul Maguire	652	4.9	−2.3
Total formal votes		13,254	98.2	
Informal votes		249	1.8	
Turnout		13,503	92.9	
Two-party-preferred result
Country	Des Frawley	6,762	51.0	−9.1
Labor	Alex Barr	6,492	49.0	+9.1
Country hold		Swing	−9.1	

=== Nudgee ===
1972 Queensland state election: Nudgee
Party	Candidate	Votes	%	±%
Labor	Jack Melloy	7,908	64.3	+2.7
Liberal	Alan Camp	3,288	26.7	−0.8
Queensland Labor	Gordon Blain	1,100	9.0	+0.4
Total formal votes		12,296	98.2	
Informal votes		221	1.8	
Turnout		12,517	94.4	
Two-party-preferred result
Labor	Jack Melloy	8,042	65.4	+1.7
Liberal	Alan Camp	4,254	34.6	−1.7
Labor hold		Swing	+1.7	

=== Nundah ===
1972 Queensland state election: Nundah
Party	Candidate	Votes	%	±%
Liberal	William Knox	5,341	47.3	−1.9
Labor	Ian Brusasco	5,100	45.2	+4.9
Queensland Labor	Ambrose Shannon	853	7.5	−3.1
Total formal votes		11,294	99.0	
Informal votes		115	1.0	
Turnout		11,409	93.8	
Two-party-preferred result
Liberal	William Knox	6,092	53.9	−5.5
Labor	Ian Brusasco	5,202	46.1	+5.5
Liberal hold		Swing	−5.5	

=== Pine Rivers ===
1972 Queensland state election: Pine Rivers
Party	Candidate	Votes	%	±%
Labor	Kenneth Leese	8,259	53.3	
Country	Allan Male	3,587	23.2	
Liberal	William Battershill	2,771	17.9	
Queensland Labor	Brian Flynn	872	5.6	
Total formal votes		15,489	98.4	
Informal votes		252	1.6	
Turnout		15,741	93.9	
Two-party-preferred result
Labor	Kenneth Leese	8,794	56.8	+4.4
Country	Allan Male	6,695	43.2	−4.4
Labor hold		Swing	+4.4	

=== Port Curtis ===
1972 Queensland state election: Port Curtis
Party	Candidate	Votes	%	±%
Labor	Martin Hanson	10,652	82.2	+0.9
Queensland Labor	Marguerita Glen	1,771	18.7	−0.9
Total formal votes		12,959	97.9	
Informal votes		278	2.1	
Turnout		13,237	91.6	
Labor hold		Swing	+0.9	

=== Redcliffe ===
1972 Queensland state election: Redcliffe
Party	Candidate	Votes	%	±%
Labor	Jack Trueman	5,218	41.7	+2.3
Country	Jim Houghton	4,179	33.4	−20.2
Liberal	John Hodges	2,415	19.3	+19.3
Queensland Labor	Thomas Grundy	709	5.6	−1.4
Total formal votes		12,521	98.6	
Informal votes		177	1.4	
Turnout		12,698	92.9	
Two-party-preferred result
Country	Jim Houghton	6,932	55.4	−5.5
Labor	Jack Trueman	5,589	44.6	+5.5
Country hold		Swing	−5.5	

=== Redlands ===
1972 Queensland state election: Redlands
Party	Candidate	Votes	%	±%
Labor	Ted Baldwin	6,929	51.6	+2.4
Country	Dick Wood	3,271	24.3	−19.2
Liberal	Edward Fitzgerald	2,746	20.4	+20.4
Queensland Labor	Kenneth Bayliss	486	3.6	−3.7
Total formal votes		13,432	98.3	
Informal votes		229	1.7	
Turnout		13,661	91.3	
Two-party-preferred result
Labor	Ted Baldwin	7,395	55.1	+2.0
Country	Dick Wood	6,037	44.9	−2.0
Labor hold		Swing	+2.0	

=== Rockhampton ===
1972 Queensland state election: Rockhampton
Party	Candidate	Votes	%	±%
Labor	Keith Wright	6,319	53.2	+2.3
Liberal	Rex Pilbeam	3,163	26.6	−14.2
Country	Terence Molloy	1,741	14.6	+14.6
Queensland Labor	Robert Bom	658	5.5	−2.8
Total formal votes		11,881	99.0	
Informal votes		125	1.0	
Turnout		12,006	94.5	
Two-party-preferred result
Labor	Keith Wright	6,643	55.9	+3.7
Liberal	Rex Pilbeam	5,238	44.1	−3.7
Labor hold		Swing	+3.7	

=== Rockhampton North ===
1972 Queensland state election: Rockhampton North
Party	Candidate	Votes	%	±%
Labor	Les Yewdale	5,639	44.0	−21.8
Liberal	Peter Vamvakaris	3,156	24.6	+0.7
Independent	Merv Thackeray	2,969	23.2	+23.2
Queensland Labor	John McKenna	1,042	8.1	−2.3
Total formal votes		12,806	98.6	
Informal votes		175	1.4	
Turnout		12,981	96.8	
Two-party-preferred result
Labor	Les Yewdale	6,540	51.1	−14.9
Liberal	Peter Vamvakaris	6,266	48.9	+14.9
Labor hold		Swing	−14.9	

=== Roma ===
1972 Queensland state election: Roma
Party	Candidate	Votes	%	±%
Country	Ken Tomkins	4,613	53.0	−3.5
Labor	Marcus Thew	2,309	31.8	+1.0
Queensland Labor	Patrick Feeney	1,102	15.2	+15.2
Total formal votes		7,265	99.0	
Informal votes		73	1.0	
Turnout		7,338	90.8	
Two-party-preferred result
Country	Ken Tomkins	4,647	64.0	+3.4
Labor	Marcus Thew	2,618	36.0	−3.4
Country hold		Swing	+3.4	

=== Salisbury ===
1972 Queensland state election: Salisbury
Party	Candidate	Votes	%	±%
Labor	Doug Sherrington	8,447	65.0	−4.5
Liberal	Rosemary Kyburz	3,226	24.8	−2.0
Queensland Labor	Kenneth Wall	1,328	10.2	+6.5
Total formal votes		13,001	98.5	
Informal votes		194	1.5	
Turnout		13,195	92.2	
Two-party-preferred result
Labor	Doug Sherrington	8,671	66.7	−1.5
Liberal	Rosemary Kyburz	4,330	33.3	+1.5
Labor hold		Swing	−1.5	

=== Sandgate ===
1972 Queensland state election: Sandgate
Party	Candidate	Votes	%	±%
Labor	Harry Dean	7,184	61.7	−1.5
Liberal	Ivan Brown	2,684	23.1	−4.0
Queensland Labor	Bernard Beston	1,770	15.2	+5.5
Total formal votes		11,638	98.2	
Informal votes		208	1.8	
Turnout		11,846	92.0	
Two-party-preferred result
Labor	Harry Dean	7,399	63.6	−2.5
Liberal	Ivan Brown	4,239	36.4	+2.5
Labor hold		Swing	−2.5	

=== Sherwood ===
1972 Queensland state election: Sherwood
Party	Candidate	Votes	%	±%
Liberal	John Herbert	6,817	53.6	−3.7
Labor	Kerry Keating	4,947	38.9	+3.9
Queensland Labor	Clarice Weedon	960	7.5	−0.2
Total formal votes		12,724	98.3	
Informal votes		217	1.7	
Turnout		12,941	93.4	
Two-party-preferred result
Liberal	John Herbert	7,615	59.8	−6.4
Labor	Kerry Keating	5,109	40.2	+6.4
Liberal hold		Swing	−6.4	

=== Somerset ===
1972 Queensland state election: Somerset
Party	Candidate	Votes	%	±%
Country	Bill Gunn	6,925	56.5	−4.1
Labor	Henry Riis	3,874	31.6	−7.8
Queensland Labor	Roland Forgan	1,263	10.3	+10.3
Independent	Robert Wilkie	198	1.6	+1.6
Total formal votes		12,260	99.0	
Informal votes		128	1.0	
Turnout		12,388	93.5	
Two-party-preferred result
Country	Bill Gunn	8,133	66.3	+5.7
Labor	Henry Riis	4,127	33.7	−5.7
Country hold		Swing	+5.7	

=== South Brisbane ===
1972 Queensland state election: South Brisbane
Party	Candidate	Votes	%	±%
Labor	Fred Bromley	5,609	49.4	−9.8
Liberal	Joseph Fenton	2,885	25.4	−4.5
Independent	Col Bennett	2,227	19.6	+19.6
Queensland Labor	Viliam Simek	591	5.2	−3.4
Independent	Anton Terpstra	47	0.4	+0.4
Total formal votes		11,359	96.8	
Informal votes		375	3.2	
Turnout		11,734	91.6	
Two-party-preferred result
Labor	Fred Bromley	6,933	61.0	+4.3
Liberal	Joseph Fenton	4,426	39.0	−4.3
Labor hold		Swing	+4.3	

=== South Coast ===
1972 Queensland state election: South Coast
Party	Candidate	Votes	%	±%
Country	Russ Hinze	5,072	39.2	−1.0
Labor	Ronald Todd	4,410	34.1	+12.2
Liberal	Bruce Bishop	2,256	17.4	−15.0
Independent	Douglas Roughton	694	5.4	+5.4
Queensland Labor	Victor Kearney	493	3.8	+0.1
Total formal votes		12,925	97.8	
Informal votes		291	2.2	
Turnout		13,216	88.3	
Two-party-preferred result
Country	Russ Hinze	7,975	61.7	−9.0
Labor	Ronald Todd	4,950	38.3	+9.0
Country hold		Swing	−9.0	

=== Stafford ===
1972 Queensland state election: Stafford
Party	Candidate	Votes	%	±%
Labor	Roy Harvey	5,872	49.5	
Liberal	Percy Smith	4,834	40.7	
Queensland Labor	James Hancock	1,163	9.8	
Total formal votes		11,869	95.4	
Informal votes		545	4.6	
Turnout		12,414	94.3	
Two-party-preferred result
Labor	Roy Harvey	6,119	51.6	−0.8
Liberal	Percy Smith	5,750	48.4	+0.8
Labor hold		Swing	−0.8	

=== Surfers Paradise ===
1972 Queensland state election: Surfers Paradise
Party	Candidate	Votes	%	±%
Labor	Keith Hunt	4,223	30.1	
Liberal	John McIlwain	4,202	29.9	
Country	Bruce Small	4,122	29.4	
Independent	Eileen Peters	655	4.7	
Queensland Labor	Frederick Bassani	536	3.8	
Independent	William Daniel	303	2.2	
Total formal votes		14,041	97.2	
Informal votes		398	2.8	
Turnout		14,439	87.8	
Two-party-preferred result
Country	Bruce Small	8,368	59.6	−11.4
Labor	Keith Hunt	5,673	40.4	+11.4
Country hold		Swing	−11.4	

=== Toowong ===
1972 Queensland state election: Toowong
Party	Candidate	Votes	%	±%
Liberal	Charles Porter	6,248	55.6	−3.5
Labor	Donald Dignam	3,987	35.5	+4.7
Queensland Labor	Brian O'Brien	996	8.9	−1.2
Total formal votes		11,231	98.7	
Informal votes		150	1.3	
Turnout		11,381	92.1	
Two-party-preferred result
Liberal	Charles Porter	7,076	63.0	−4.3
Labor	Donald Dignam	4,155	37.0	+4.3
Liberal hold		Swing	−4.3	

=== Toowoomba North ===
1972 Queensland state election: Toowoomba North
Party	Candidate	Votes	%	±%
Labor	Ray Bousen	7,336	61.8	+13.8
Country	Nellie Robinson	2,072	17.4	−9.4
Liberal	Athol Zerbst	1,599	13.5	−2.9
Queensland Labor	John Davis	872	7.3	−1.5
Total formal votes		11,879	99.2	
Informal votes		99	0.8	
Turnout		11,978	93.6	
Two-party-preferred result
Labor	Ray Bousen	7,707	64.9	+7.8
Country	Nellie Robinson	4,172	35.1	−7.8
Labor hold		Swing	+7.8	

=== Toowoomba South ===
1972 Queensland state election: Toowoomba South
Party	Candidate	Votes	%	±%
Labor	Peter Wood	6,148	53.1	−0.3
Country	John Peel	2,446	21.1	+21.1
Liberal	Allison Dickson	2,151	18.6	−21.6
Queensland Labor	Francis Mullins	831	7.2	+0.8
Total formal votes		11,576	98.9	
Informal votes		133	1.1	
Turnout		11,709	94.0	
Two-party-preferred result
Labor	Peter Wood	6,589	56.9	+3.0
Country	John Peel	4,987	43.1	+43.1
Labor hold		Swing	+3.0	

=== Townsville ===
1972 Queensland state election: Townsville
Party	Candidate	Votes	%	±%
Liberal	Norman Scott-Young	3,913	36.5	
Labor	Mike Reynolds	3,672	34.3	
Country	Owen Griffiths	2,341	21.9	
Queensland Labor	William Higgins	783	7.3	
Total formal votes		10,709	98.6	
Informal votes		148	1.4	
Turnout		10,857	85.8	
Two-party-preferred result
Liberal	Norman Scott-Young	6,588	61.5	+4.3
Labor	Mike Reynolds	4,121	38.5	−4.3
Liberal hold		Swing	+4.3	

=== Townsville South ===
1972 Queensland state election: Townsville South
Party	Candidate	Votes	%	±%
Independent	Tom Aikens	5,500	51.0	−2.1
Labor	Alex Wilson	4,391	40.7	+6.0
Queensland Labor	Kerry Smith	890	8.3	−2.6
Total formal votes		10,781	98.7	
Informal votes		144	1.3	
Turnout		10,925	93.9	
Two-candidate-preferred result
Independent	Tom Aikens	6,210	57.6	−1.6
Labor	Alex Wilson	4,571	42.4	+1.6
Independent hold		Swing	−1.6	

=== Townsville West ===
1972 Queensland state election: Townsville West
Party	Candidate	Votes	%	±%
Labor	Perc Tucker	5,526	49.2	+1.6
Liberal	Keith Rundle	3,091	27.5	+2.3
Country	Jean Thomas	1,477	13.1	−3.9
Queensland Labor	Brian Hurney	1,146	10.2	0.0
Total formal votes		11,240	98.7	
Informal votes		145	1.3	
Turnout		11,385	91.7	
Two-party-preferred result
Labor	Perc Tucker	5,862	52.2	+2.0
Liberal	Keith Rundle	5,378	47.8	−2.0
Labor hold		Swing	+2.0	

=== Warrego ===
1972 Queensland state election: Warrego
Party	Candidate	Votes	%	±%
Labor	Jack Aiken	4,728	63.4	+18.4
Country	John Nevell	2,729	36.6	−2.5
Total formal votes		7,457	98.7	
Informal votes		97	1.3	
Turnout		7,554	90.2	
Labor hold		Swing	+4.4	

=== Warwick ===
1972 Queensland state election: Warwick
Party	Candidate	Votes	%	±%
Country	David Cory	4,258	49.3	−4.5
Labor	Raymond Lyons	3,053	35.4	−2.6
Queensland Labor	Daniel Skehan	679	7.9	−0.3
Independent	Norman Stuart	641	7.4	+7.4
Total formal votes		8,631	98.9	
Informal votes		98	1.1	
Turnout		8,729	94.9	
Two-party-preferred result
Country	David Cory	5,305	61.5	+0.2
Labor	Raymond Lyons	3,326	38.5	−0.2
Country hold		Swing	+0.2	

=== Wavell ===
1972 Queensland state election: Wavell
Party	Candidate	Votes	%	±%
Labor	Herbert Bromley	5,661	47.0	+9.5
Liberal	Arthur Crawford	5,351	44.5	+15.1
Queensland Labor	Peter Flanagan	1,024	8.5	+0.7
Total formal votes		12,036	99.1	
Informal votes		103	0.9	
Turnout		12,139	94.5	
Two-party-preferred result
Liberal	Arthur Crawford	6,279	52.2	−2.7
Labor	Herbert Bromley	5,757	47.8	+2.7
Liberal hold		Swing	−2.7	

=== Whitsunday ===
1972 Queensland state election: Whitsunday
Party	Candidate	Votes	%	±%
Country	Ron Camm	5,024	52.7	
Labor	Graeme Bowen	4,029	42.2	
Queensland Labor	Bernard Lewis	485	5.1	
Total formal votes		9,538	98.7	
Informal votes		121	1.3	
Turnout		9,659	93.7	
Two-party-preferred result
Country	Ron Camm	5,427	56.9	+0.3
Labor	Graeme Bowen	4,111	43.1	−0.3
Country hold		Swing	+0.3	

=== Windsor ===
1972 Queensland state election: Windsor
Party	Candidate	Votes	%	±%
Labor	Bryan Walsh	5,090	43.8	−1.8
Liberal	Bob Moore	5,060	43.5	+1.0
Queensland Labor	Thomas Heike	1,480	12.7	+0.8
Total formal votes		11,630	98.7	
Informal votes		157	1.3	
Turnout		11,787	93.6	
Two-party-preferred result
Liberal	Bob Moore	6,408	55.1	+1.6
Labor	Bryan Walsh	5,222	44.9	−1.6
Liberal hold		Swing	+1.6	

=== Wolston ===
1972 Queensland state election: Wolston
Party	Candidate	Votes	%	±%
Labor	Evan Marginson	7,973	65.4	+7.0
Liberal	Dirk Plooy	2,595	21.3	−16.2
Queensland Labor	Leonard Maguire	971	8.0	+3.9
Independent	George Whyte	653	5.4	+5.4
Total formal votes		12,192	97.3	
Informal votes		334	2.7	
Turnout		12,526	92.2	
Two-party-preferred result
Labor	Evan Marginson	8,572	70.3	+8.7
Liberal	Dirk Plooy	3,620	29.7	−8.7
Labor hold		Swing	+8.7	

=== Wynnum ===
1972 Queensland state election: Wynnum
Party	Candidate	Votes	%	±%
Labor	Ted Harris	7,352	63.3	+2.8
Liberal	Brian Cahill	3,427	29.5	−2.1
Queensland Labor	Gordon Randall	835	7.2	+1.4
Total formal votes		11,614	98.6	
Informal votes		167	1.4	
Turnout		11,781	93.6	
Two-party-preferred result
Labor	Ted Harris	7,493	64.5	+1.5
Liberal	Brian Cahill	4,121	35.5	−1.5
Labor hold		Swing	+1.5	

=== Yeronga ===
1972 Queensland state election: Yeronga
Party	Candidate	Votes	%	±%
Liberal	Norm Lee	5,546	48.3	−1.2
Labor	Clem Jones	5,156	44.9	+5.2
Queensland Labor	Harry Wright	770	6.7	−4.0
Total formal votes		11,472	98.7	
Informal votes		156	1.3	
Turnout		11,628	94.3	
Two-party-preferred result
Liberal	Norm Lee	6,234	54.3	−5.7
Labor	Clem Jones	5,238	45.7	+5.7
Liberal hold		Swing	−5.7	

== See also ==
- 1972 Queensland state election
- Members of the Queensland Legislative Assembly, 1972-1974
