= Members of the Queensland Legislative Assembly, 1974–1977 =

This is a list of members of the 41st Legislative Assembly of Queensland from 1974 to 1977, as elected at the 1974 state election held on 7 December 1974.

| Name | Party | Electorate | Term in office |
|---|---|---|---|
| Mike Ahern | National | Landsborough | 1968–1990 |
| Rob Akers | Liberal | Pine Rivers | 1974–1983 |
| Tom Aikens | North Queensland Party | Townsville South | 1944–1977 |
| Gilbert Alison | Liberal | Maryborough | 1971–1977, 1983–1989 |
| Roy Armstrong | National | Mulgrave | 1960–1980 |
| Angelo Bertoni | National | Mount Isa | 1974–1983 |
| Hon Val Bird | National | Burdekin | 1969–1983 |
| Hon Joh Bjelke-Petersen | National | Barambah | 1947–1987 |
| Tony Bourke ^{[3]} | Liberal | Lockyer | 1976–1980 |
| Ivan Brown ^{[1]}^{[5]} | Liberal | Clayfield | 1976–1977 |
| Tom Burns | Labor | Lytton | 1972–1996 |
| David Byrne | Liberal | Belmont | 1974–1977 |
| Hon Ron Camm | National | Whitsunday | 1961–1980 |
| Hon Fred Campbell | Liberal | Aspley | 1960–1980 |
| Ed Casey | Independent/Labor ^{[4]} | Mackay | 1969–1995 |
| Hon Sir Gordon Chalk ^{[3]} | Liberal | Lockyer | 1947–1976 |
| Geoff Chinchen | Liberal | Mount Gravatt | 1963–1977 |
| David Cory | National | Warwick | 1963–1977 |
| Dr Arthur Crawford | Liberal | Wavell | 1969–1977 |
| Harry Dean | Labor | Sandgate | 1960–1977 |
| Eric Deeral | National | Cook | 1974–1977 |
| Sam Doumany | Liberal | Kurilpa | 1974–1983 |
| Hon Dr Llewellyn Edwards | Liberal | Ipswich | 1972–1983 |
| Tony Elliott | National | Cunningham | 1974–2001 |
| Des Frawley | National | Murrumba | 1972–1983 |
| Ivan Gibbs | National | Albert | 1974–1989 |
| Bill Glasson | National | Gregory | 1974–1989 |
| John Goleby | National | Redlands | 1974–1985 |
| Hon John Greenwood | Liberal | Ashgrove | 1974–1983 |
| Bill Gunn | National | Somerset | 1972–1992 |
| Terry Gygar | Liberal | Stafford | 1974–1983, 1984–1989 |
| Albert Hales | National | Ipswich West | 1974–1977 |
| Martin Hanson ^{[2]} | Labor | Port Curtis | 1963–1976 |
| Lindsay Hartwig | National | Callide | 1972–1986 |
| Hon John Herbert | Liberal | Sherwood | 1956–1978 |
| Hon Nev Hewitt | National | Auburn | 1956–1980 |
| Bill Hewitt | Liberal | Chatsworth | 1966–1983 |
| Hon Russ Hinze | National | South Coast | 1966–1988 |
| Hon Max Hodges | National | Gympie | 1957–1979 |
| Hon Keith Hooper | Liberal | Greenslopes | 1957–1977 |
| Kevin Hooper | Labor | Archerfield | 1972–1984 |
| Max Hooper | National | Townsville West | 1974–1980 |
| Hon Jim Houghton | National | Redcliffe | 1960–1979 |
| Jack Houston | Labor | Bulimba | 1957–1980 |
| Lou Jensen | Labor/Independent | Bundaberg | 1969–1977 |
| Ray Jones | Labor | Cairns | 1965–1983 |
| Bob Katter | National | Flinders | 1974–1992 |
| Bill Kaus | Liberal | Mansfield | 1966–1986 |
| Vicky Kippin | National | Mourilyan | 1974–1980 |
| Hon William Knox | Liberal | Nundah | 1957–1989 |
| Rosemary Kyburz | Liberal | Salisbury | 1974–1983 |
| Bill Lamond | National | Wynnum | 1974–1977 |
| Colin Lamont | Liberal | South Brisbane | 1974–1977 |
| Don Lane | Liberal | Merthyr | 1971–1989 |
| Hon Norm Lee | Liberal | Yeronga | 1964–1989 |
| Vince Lester | National | Belyando | 1974–2004 |
| Hon Bill Lickiss | Liberal | Mount Coot-tha | 1963–1989 |
| Brian Lindsay | Liberal | Everton | 1974–1977 |
| Dr John Lockwood | Liberal | Toowoomba North | 1974–1983 |
| Harold Lowes | Liberal | Brisbane | 1974–1977 |
| Hon Peter McKechnie | National | Carnarvon | 1974–1989 |
| Evan Marginson | Labor | Wolston | 1969–1977 |
| Jack Melloy | Labor | Nudgee | 1960–1977 |
| Col Miller | Liberal | Ithaca | 1966–1986 |
| Bob Moore | Liberal | Windsor | 1969–1983 |
| Selwyn Muller | National | Fassifern | 1969–1983 |
| John Murray ^{[1]} | Liberal | Clayfield | 1963–1976 |
| Don Neal | National | Balonne | 1972–1992 |
| Hon Tom Newbery | National | Mirani | 1965–1980 |
| Charles Porter | Liberal | Toowong | 1966–1980 |
| Lin Powell | National | Isis | 1974–1989 |
| Bill Prest ^{[2]} | Labor | Port Curtis | 1976–1992 |
| Ted Row | National | Hinchinbrook | 1972–1989 |
| Dr Norman Scott-Young | Liberal | Townsville | 1972–1983 |
| Gordon Simpson | National | Cooroora | 1974–1989 |
| Sir Bruce Small | National | Surfers Paradise | 1972–1977 |
| Hon Vic Sullivan | National | Condamine | 1960–1983 |
| Martin Tenni | National | Barron River | 1974–1989 |
| Hon Ken Tomkins | National | Roma | 1967–1983 |
| Neil Turner | National | Warrego | 1974–1986, 1991–1998 |
| John Warner | National | Toowoomba South | 1974–1986 |
| Hon Claude Wharton | National | Burnett | 1960–1986 |
| Keith Wright | Labor | Rockhampton | 1969–1984 |
| Les Yewdale | Labor | Rockhampton North | 1972–1989 |
| Dennis Young | Liberal | Baroona | 1974–1977 |

^{1} On 11 February 1976, the Liberal member for Clayfield, John Murray, resigned. Liberal candidate Ivan Brown won the resulting by-election on 11 May 1976.
^{2} On 19 February 1976, the Labor member for Port Curtis, Martin Hanson, resigned due to ill-health, and died the following day. Labor candidate Bill Prest won the resulting by-election on 29 May 1976.
^{3} On 12 August 1976, the Liberal member for Lockyer and Deputy Premier, Sir Gordon Chalk, resigned. Liberal candidate Tony Bourke won the resulting by-election on 16 October 1976.
^{4} On 7 March 1977, the Independent member for Mackay, Ed Casey, who had won twice as an independent after losing Labor preselection ahead of the 1972 election, was readmitted to the Labor Party.
^{5} On 12 May 1977, the Liberal member for Clayfield, Ivan Brown, died. No by-election was held due to the proximity of the 1977 state election. The Clayfield electorate was abolished at the election as a result of an electoral redistribution.

== See also ==
- 1974 Queensland state election
- Premier: Joh Bjelke-Petersen (National Party) (1968–1987)
