= Betty Byrne Henderson =

Australian philanthropist (1932–2025)

- Born: 1932
- Died: 2 February 2025
- Other names: Betty Byrne; Betty Henderson
- Occupation: automotive dealer (retired)

Elizabeth Anne Byrne Henderson AM (born 1932) is an Australian philanthropist and retired businesswoman.

Byrne Henderson is known for her work in the automotive industry, advocacy in the health sector and donations to tertiary education.

== Early life ==
Byrne Henderson attended All Hallows' School in Brisbane. After leaving school, she worked as a stenographer, a book keeper and as a junior sales clerk.

== Career ==
=== Byrne Ford ===
Henderson established a Ford dealership called Byrne Ford in Brisbane with her husband Bernie Byrne in 1969. When her husband died in 1977, she took over the business as sole owner and governing director, despite experiencing sexism in a male-dominated industry. Under her guidance, the company rapidly expanded and grew from having a staff of 35 workers to having over 140 employees. In October 1991, the company became the first Australian car dealership to attain Quality Assurance accreditation. Henderson handed over the company to her son Peter Byrne in 1995.

=== Philanthropy ===
In 1987, Henderson commenced an ongoing philanthropic relationship with the Queensland University of Technology when she gifted a substantial amount of money to the university to establish a fundraising course. Among other things, Henderson's donations are credited with assisting medical research, providing student scholarships, and enabling the restoration of Old Government House.

In 1997, Henderson was awarded an honorary Doctor of the University degree from Griffith University, in recognition of her contribution to society.

Her community involvement also extended to being a board member of the Brisbane City Council's Transport Committee and the Queensland Harness Racing Board as well as a member of the Brisbane Cricket Ground Trust and the Queensland Corrective Services Commission. She was also a foundation member of the State Library of Queensland Foundation, and a member of the Ronald McDonald House Committee and Zonta International.

=== Health ===
Henderson is also known for her work in the health sector. She had a lengthy association with the Royal Brisbane Women's Hospital, chairing the hospital board from 1982 to 1991. A women's health centre located within the Royal Brisbane and Women's Hospital is named in her honour. Henderson is credited with helping introduce mammography buses for women in remote areas as well as supporting the development of a midwifery system in Aboriginal communities.

=== Politics ===
Henderson contested the 1989 Merthyr state by-election which was triggered after the resignation of Don Lane in the wake of the Fitzgerald Inquiry. As the National Party candidate, Henderson bore the brunt of a substantial swing against the government, polling third behind Santo Santoro (Liberal) and Barbara Dawson (Labor).

== Awards ==
In the 1995 Queen's Birthday Honours, she was made a Member of the Order of Australia in recognition of her service to the community and to women's health.

In 2011, she was named as a Queensland Great.

In 2022, Henderson received the Queensland Community Foundation's Board of Governors Award for Outstanding Achievement.

In 2025, she was inducted into the Queensland Business Leaders Hall of Fame in recognition for her groundbreaking contribution as a businesswoman to the automotive industry and for significant contributions to philanthropy and the community.
