= 1989 Merthyr state by-election =

The 1989 Merthyr state by-election was a by-election held on 13 May 1989 for the Queensland Legislative Assembly seat of Merthyr, based in the inner Brisbane suburb of New Farm.

The by-election was triggered by the resignation of National MP and former minister Don Lane on 20 January 1989. Lane, who had been a member of the Liberal Party until shortly after the 1983 election, had admitted that he had misappropriated funds during his time as a minister in Sir Joh Bjelke-Petersen's government, which was being investigated by the Fitzgerald Inquiry. Furthermore, he implicated 14 other serving or former ministers in these activities. The media, led by The Courier-Mail newspaper, questioned the morality of a confessed dishonest politician continuing a parliamentary career at the expense of taxpayers. Upon his resignation, despite the Labor Party's opposition to any further entitlements, he collected a superannuation payout of A$535,000 and awaited charges from the inquiry's special prosecutor, Doug Drummond QC.

The by-election campaign was quite unusual, with a total of 10 candidates nominating. A local car salesperson, Betty Byrne Henderson, won National Party preselection and campaigned on the slogan "Send a Message to Canberra". However, most of the campaign's attention was on Queensland issues—in particular the daily revelations from the Fitzgerald Inquiry.

== Candidates ==
The candidates were:

- Santo Santoro of the Liberal Party
- Barbara Dawson of the Labor Party
- Betty Byrne Henderson, a car salesperson representing the National Party
- John Brown of the Australian Democrats
- Gerry Bellino, an alleged crime boss and one-time nightclub owner, named in the terms of reference for the Fitzgerald Inquiry, and accused of running several brothels and gambling dens in Fortitude Valley in the 1980s
- Tanya Wilde, the first transgender political candidate in Australia, who ran on a gay rights platform opposing police violence against gay men in particular
- Nigel Powell, a former undercover policeman in the Licensing Branch who helped spark the Fitzgerald Inquiry, running unofficially under a "Citizens Against Corruption Party" banner and
- Isabella Ciadamidaro, an independent

== Results ==
Merthyr state by-election, 1989
Party	Candidate	Votes	%	±%
Liberal	Santo Santoro	6,170	35.91	+3.82
Labor	Barbara Dawson	5,623	32.73	+0.23
National	Betty Byrne Henderson	2,753	16.02	–16.74
Independent	Nigel Powell	1,281	7.46	+7.46
Independent	Tanya Wilde	540	3.14	+3.14
Democrats	John Brown	443	2.58	+0.82
Independent	Gerry Bellino	334	1.94	+1.94
Independent	Isabella Ciadamidaro	36	0.21	+0.21
Total formal votes		17,180	95.29	–1.60
Informal votes		848	4.71	+1.60
Turnout		18,028	78.92	−10.35
Two-party-preferred result
Liberal	Santo Santoro	9,784	56.95	N/A
Labor	Barbara Dawson	7,396	43.05	N/A
Liberal gain from National		Swing	N/A	

== Aftermath ==
The result was the first real indication of very serious problems for the National Party, which faced a statutory general election by the end of the year. With the collapse of the National vote, the Liberals managed to win the seat against Labor on preferences. However, as a cross-bench party in the position of attacking an unpopular government while trying to avoid voters switching to the Labor opposition, and in some key seats dependent upon preference flows from National voters, some analysts suggested that if the government's support was to collapse completely in South East Queensland, Labor rather than the Liberals could become the key beneficiaries of the changing political tide. Mike Ahern, whose leadership of the Nationals was being questioned by conservatives within his party, survived as Premier of Queensland for another four months before being replaced by Russell Cooper.

At the December 1989 state election, Labor under Wayne Goss won the election with 54 of the Assembly's 89 seats, mainly on the strength of taking all but five seats in Brisbane. Santoro was nearly swept up in this massive Labor wave, surviving by only 164 votes after preferences were distributed. He held Merthyr and its successor seat, Clayfield, for 12 years until losing it at the 2001 election. He later served as a Federal Senator and a minister in the Howard government.

== See also ==
- List of Queensland state by-elections
