= Sue Boyce =

Australian politician

Senator for Queensland
- In office 19 April 2007 – 30 June 2014
- Preceded by: Santo Santoro

Personal details
- Born: Suzanne Kay Davis; 15 March 1951 (age 75) Brisbane, Queensland, Australia
- Party: Liberal National Party of Queensland
- Other political affiliations: Liberal Party of Australia
- Education: Monash University; Queensland University of Technology

Suzanne Kay Boyce (born 15 March 1951, in Brisbane, Queensland), Australian politician, businesswoman and disability advocate, is a former member of the Australian Senate for Queensland. She was selected by the Liberal Party in Queensland to replace Santo Santoro in the Senate, a decision formally endorsed by the Parliament of Queensland. She was Queensland's first female Liberal senator since 1984 and was sworn in a senator on 8 May 2007.

Boyce was educated at Monash University from where she graduated with a Bachelor of Arts, and has a Masters of Business from the Queensland University of Technology.

Boyce was the chair of Everhard Industries, a plumbing supplies company founded by her father Alfred Davis, a position from which she resigned from after her elevation to the Senate.

She has also been significantly involved in advocacy for the rights of people with disability, particularly children and adults with intellectual disability.

In 2009, she was one of two Liberal senators to support the federal Labor government's emissions trading scheme.

In 2013, she was the only one from her party to cross the floor to vote for same-sex marriage bill. This made her the first and only federal Liberal politician to vote for marriage equality before the 2017 postal survey.

On 8 October 2012, Boyce announced her intention to retire and therefore not contest the 2013 federal election. Her Senate term ended 30 June 2014.
