= Bill Moore (Queensland politician) =

Australian politician

Member of the Queensland Legislative Assembly for Merthyr
- In office 9 November 1940 – 3 August 1957
- Preceded by: James Keogh
- Succeeded by: Ray Ramsden

Personal details
- Born: William Matthew Moore; 11 September 1897 Miles, Queensland, Australia
- Died: 3 February 1976 (aged 78) Brisbane, Queensland, Australia
- Resting place: Pinnaroo Lawn Cemetery
- Party: QLP
- Other political affiliations: Labor
- Spouse: Susan May Madden (m.1924 d.1981)
- Occupation: School teacher

William Matthew Moore (11 September 1897 – 3 February 1976) was a member of the Queensland Legislative Assembly.

== Biography ==
Moore was born at Miles, Queensland, the son of Patrick Moore and his wife Elizabeth Ann (née Cleary) and was educated in Miles and Brisbane. He was a schoolteacher for thirteen years and an inspector for the State Government Insurance Office. From 1933 to 1940 he was a private businessman. He died in February 1976 and was buried in the Pinnaroo Lawn Cemetery.

== Public career ==
When the sitting member for Merthyr, James Keogh died in 1940 a by-election was held. Moore, the Labor Party candidate, defeated the UAP candidate and previous member for Merthyr, Patrick Kerwin. In 1957, Moore had joined with Premier, Vince Gair and most of his cabinet in forming the breakaway QLP. An election was called later in the year and he was defeated by the Liberal Party's Ray Ramsden.

During his time in government, Moore held the following portfolios:

- Acting Secretary for Labour and Industry 1948–1949
- Secretary for Mines and Immigration 1949–1950
- Secretary for Health and Home Affairs 1950–1957

When Queensland's free hospital scheme was under attack by the federal government in the 1950s Moore fought tooth and nail to successfully retain it. He was also the member responsible for the Health Acts Amendment Act 1955 which banned the manufacture, sale or use of paint containing white lead.

Parliament of Queensland
Preceded by James Keogh	Member for Merthyr; 1940–1957	Succeeded by Ray Ramsden
