= Peter McLachlan (Queensland politician) =

Australian politician

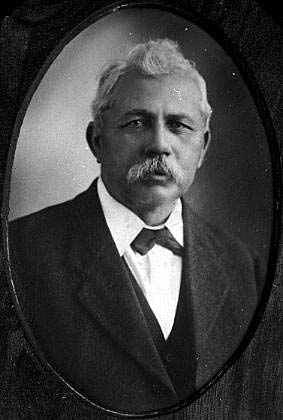
- Peter McLachlan c.1921

Member of the Queensland Legislative Assembly for Fortitude Valley
- In office 5 February 1908 – 27 April 1912 Serving with David Bowman
- Preceded by: John McMaster
- Succeeded by: David Bowman

Member of the Queensland Legislative Assembly for Merthyr
- In office 22 May 1915 – 9 October 1920
- Preceded by: Thomas Welsby
- Succeeded by: Peter MacGregor
- In office 15 May 1923 – 11 May 1929
- Preceded by: Peter MacGregor
- Succeeded by: Dr Patrick Kerwin

Personal details
- Born: Peter Alfred McLachlan; 23 September 1867 Dundee, Scotland
- Died: 27 October 1929 (aged 62) Brisbane, Queensland, Australia
- Resting place: Lutwyche Cemetery
- Party: Labor
- Spouse: Mary Donnelly (m.1892)
- Occupation: Printer

Peter Alfred McLachlan (23 September 1867 – 27 October 1929) was a printer and member of the Queensland Legislative Assembly.

== Biography ==
McLachlan was born in Dundee, Scotland, to parents Andrew McLachlan and his wife Catherine (née McTavish). He came to Queensland with his family in 1873 and attended Gympie Catholic School. On leaving school he became an apprentice printer, working for The Gympie Times and then the Eidsvold Register. He then moved to Brisbane and found work as a journeyman with the Queensland Government Printing Office.

In 1892 he married Mary Donnelly. Awarded the Pro Ecclesia et Pontifice by the pope, McLachlan died after entering the Mater Misericordiae Hospital to undergo an operation in October 1929. His funeral proceeded from St Stephen's Cathedral in Brisbane to the Lutwyche Cemetery.

== Public career ==
At the 1908 Queensland state election, McLachlan, for the Labour Party, and along with David Bowman, won the two member seat of Fortitude Valley. He was the member until 1912 when the seat reverted to a one-member constituency and McLachlan then contested the new seat of Merthyr. He lost by four votes to the Ministerialist candidate, Thomas Welsby but three years later, at the 1915 Queensland state election, he won the seat, beating his opponent Mr Lackey convincingly.

He lost Merthyr at the 1920 state elections to Peter MacGregor, the National candidate but regained the seat in 1923.

McLachlan was also an alderman in the Brisbane Municipal Council, from 1921 until 1924. He served on the Parks Committee for two of those years and was also Chairman of the council's Finance Committee.

Parliament of Queensland
Preceded by John McMaster	Member for Fortitude Valley; 1908–1912; Served alongside: David Bowman	Succeeded by David Bowman
Preceded by Thomas Welsby	Member for Merthyr; 1915–1920	Succeeded by Peter MacGregor
Preceded by Peter MacGregor	Member for Merthyr; 1923–1929	Succeeded by Dr Patrick Kerwin
