= Peter MacGregor (Queensland politician) =

Australian politician

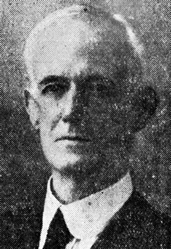

Member of the Queensland Legislative Assembly for Merthyr
- In office 9 October 1920 – 12 May 1923
- Preceded by: Peter McLachlan
- Succeeded by: Peter McLachlan

Personal details
- Born: Peter Balderston MacGregor; 9 April 1866 Helidon, Queensland, Australia
- Died: 10 April 1936 (aged 70) New Farm, Queensland, Australia
- Party: National
- Spouse: Mabel Newton (m.1899)
- Education: Balliol College, Oxford
- Occupation: Barrister

Peter Balderston Macgregor K.C. (9 April 1866 – 10 April 1936) was a member of the Queensland Legislative Assembly.

== Biography ==
Macgregor was born in Helidon, Queensland, the son of Alexander Macgregor and his wife Frances Elizabeth (née Eves). He attended East Ipswich State School, Ipswich Grammar School and then Balliol College, Oxford where he studied law. He became a law clerk for Lilley & O'Sullivan before being employed by Samuel Griffith as an assistant. In 1894, he had his own practice and in 1900-1901 he was an acting district judge. He was also an acting judge on the Queensland Supreme Court in 1932.

In 1899, Macregor married Mabel Newton and together had two sons and two daughters. His daughter Frances Mary Macgregor had a career as an actress in Australia, England, and Hollywood as Mary Macgregor. Her brother Richard Alexander Macgregor had a career in radio as Peter Macgregor. The brother and sister occasionally worked together.

Macgregor died in 1936 and his funeral proceeded from his New Farm residence, "Craigroyston", to the Mt Thompson Crematorium.

== Public career ==
Representing the Nationalist Party, he won the seat of Merthyr in the Queensland Legislative Assembly in 1920, defeating the sitting member, Peter McLachlan of the Labor Party. He served one term before being defeated three years later by McLachlan.

MacGregor was the editor of the State Reporter and Law Journal, a member of the Queensland Club, and president of the Women's College Council from 1914-1936. He was also a champion lawn tennis player.

Parliament of Queensland
Preceded by Peter McLachlan	Member for Merthyr; 1920–1923	Succeeded by Peter McLachlan
