= Harold Taylor (Australian politician) =

Australian politician (1892–1972)

Harold Taylor DSO

Member of the Queensland Legislative Assembly for Hamilton
- In office 3 May 1947 – 29 Apr 1950
- Preceded by: John Beals Chandler
- Succeeded by: Seat abolished

Member of the Queensland Legislative Assembly for Clayfield
- In office 29 Apr 1950 – 1 Jun 1963
- Preceded by: New seat
- Succeeded by: John Murray

Personal details
- Born: Harold Bourne Taylor; 25 February 1892 Brisbane, Queensland, Australia
- Died: 6 December 1972 (aged 76) Redland Bay, Queensland, Australia
- Party: Liberal Party
- Other political affiliations: QPP
- Spouse(s): Jean Cox (m.1915 d.1955), Dulcie Irene George (m.1956 d.1987)
- Occupation: Company executive

Harold Bourne "Squizzy" Taylor (25 February 1892 – 6 December 1972) was a Company executive and member of the Queensland Legislative Assembly.

== Biography ==
Taylor was born in Brisbane to parents John Taylor and his wife Ada Jeannie (née Bourne). He was educated at Brisbane Boys' Central School and in World War I fought in Egypt and Gallipoli. He commanded the 27th Battery AIF from 1916 to 1917 and was mentioned in dispatches and wounded in 1917. He was then promoted to major and awarded the Distinguished Service Order in 1918. from 1918 until 1919 he was a member of the Brisbane Military Censorship Committee.

In World War II he was Commander of 2nd AIF Artillery Reinforcements Training Regiment in 1941 to 1942. In civilian life he was an Executive with Burns Philp Ltd in 1927, and manager of Smiths Ltd in 1932.

In 1915 Taylor married Jean Cox. Jean died in 1955 and in January the following year he remarried, this time to Dulcie Irene George (died 1987). Harold Taylor died in December 1972 at Redland Bay and was cremated at Mt Thompson Crematorium.

== Public career ==
In 1947, Taylor, at first a member of the QPP and then the Liberal Party from 1948, easily won the seat of Hamilton at that year's state election. Hamilton was abolished before the 1950 state election and he then stood for and won the new seat of Clayfield. He remained the member for Clayfield until his retirement from politics in 1963. From 1957 until 1963 he was the Chairman of Committees.

He was a member of many associations including the Queensland Library Board, the United Service Club of Babinda, the Royal Queensland Golf Club; and National Association of Left-hand Golfers of Australia. He was President of the Babinda Chamber of Commerce and Returned and Services League of Australia (South-East District branch) in 1919 and from 1929 to 1931. He was also an Executive of the Social Service League during the Great Depression.

Parliament of Queensland
Preceded by John Beals Chandler	Member for Hamilton; 1947–1950	Abolished
New seat	Member for Clayfield; 1950–1963	Succeeded by John Murray
