= James Keogh (Australian politician) =

Australian politician

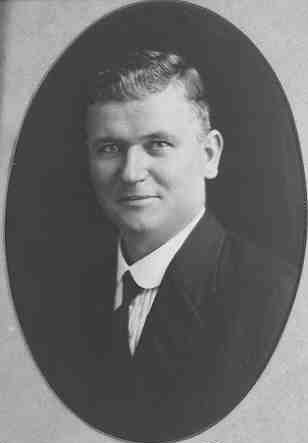

Member of the Queensland Legislative Assembly for Merthyr
- In office 11 June 1932 – 31 August 1940
- Preceded by: Patrick Kerwin
- Succeeded by: William Moore

Personal details
- Born: James Patrick Keogh; 1888 Thurles, County Tipperary, Ireland
- Died: 31 August 1940 (aged 52) Brisbane, Queensland, Australia
- Resting place: Nudgee Cemetery
- Party: Labor Party
- Spouse: Clara Ethel Clifford (m.1918 d.1978)
- Occupation: Miner

James Patrick Keogh (1888 – 31 August 1940) was a member of the Queensland Legislative Assembly.

== Biography ==
Keogh was born in Thurles, County Tipperary, the son of William Keogh and his wife Mary (née Maher). He arrived in Queensland around 1902 and worked as a miner in north Queensland before serving in the 1st AIF assigned as a gunner to the 3rd Battery Australian Field Artillery Regiment in World War I. Here he was one of the original Anzacs who fought at Gallipoli. Later in the war he was gassed, wounded and reported dead while serving in Belgium and finally invalided back to Australia. In the 1930s he was once again reported dead from the pulpit of his local church but when friends went to his home to offer their condolences they found him mowing his lawn.

On 20 December 1918 he married Clara Ethel Clifford (died 1978) in England and together had three sons and three daughters. Keogh had been ill for some time before dying at the Rosemount Military Hospital in August 1940. It is thought that the effects of the gassing and injuries he received in World War I hastened his death. He was buried in the Nudgee Cemetery.

== Public career ==
Keogh was an alderman on the Brisbane City Council, representing the ward of Fortitude Valley from 1925 until 1931. During that time he served on nearly all of the council's committees.

From 1932 until his death in 1940 Keogh was the member for Merthyr in the Queensland Legislative Assembly. He was the government representative on the Metropolitan Fire Brigade Board.

Parliament of Queensland
Preceded by Patrick Kerwin	Member for Merthyr; 1932–1940	Succeeded by William Moore
