= Nellie Robinson (politician) =

Australian politician

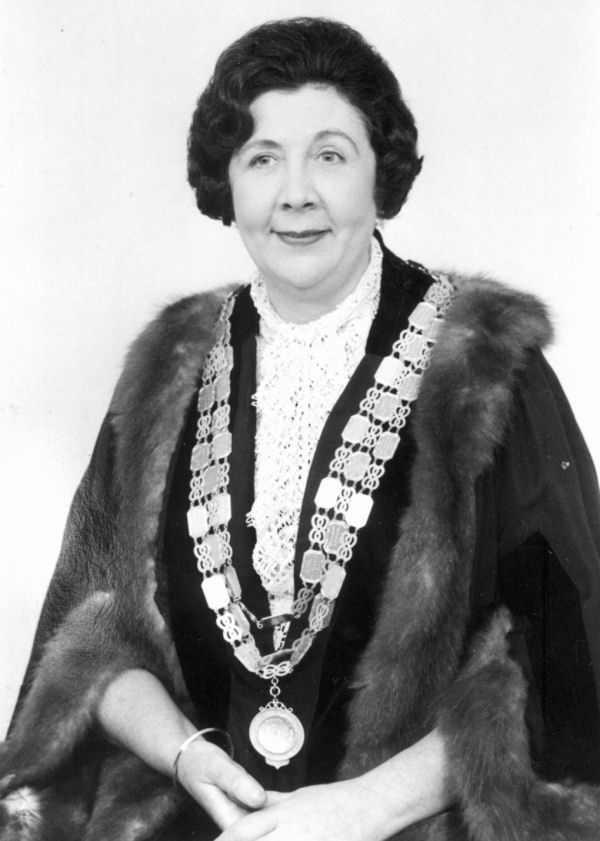
Nellie E. Robinson in her Mayoral robes

Nellie Elizabeth Robinson OBE (1915 – 19 September 1992) was the first female mayor in Queensland, Australia. She was elected mayor of the City of Toowoomba in 1967.

== Early life ==
Nellie Robinson was born in Toowoomba.

== Political career ==
Robinson was elected as an Alderman to the Toowoomba City Council in 1961 and was elected Queensland's first female mayor in 1967. In the 1972 Queensland state election she was a candidate for the Country Party in the seat of Toowoomba North but was unsuccessful. In 1979, she was made an officer of the Order of the British Empire for "distinguished service to local government".

== Later life ==
Nellie Robinson retired in 1981 because of ill health and died on 19 September 1992. Robinson is buried in the Drayton and Toowoomba Cemetery.

== Legacy ==
In her will, Robinson bequeathed twenty thousand dollars to the Toowoomba Council for the Robinson collection of historic memorabilia held in the local history library in Toowoomba.

== See also ==
- List of mayors of Toowoomba
