= Sam Ramsden =

Australian politician (1913–1986)

The Reverend Sam Ramsden JP

Member of the Queensland Legislative Assembly for Merthyr
- In office 3 August 1957 – 30 June 1971
- Preceded by: William Moore
- Succeeded by: Don Lane

Personal details
- Born: Samuel Raymond Ramsden; 10 October 1913 Carlton, New South Wales, Australia
- Died: 1 July 1986 (aged 88) Greenslopes, Queensland, Australia
- Party: Liberal Party
- Spouse(s): Audrey V Mills (m.1946), Marie Rush Myhill (m.1970 d.1985)
- Occupation: Church of England Preacher

Samuel Raymond Ramsden (10 October 1913 – 1 July 1986) was a member of the Queensland Legislative Assembly.

== Biography ==
Ramsden was born at Carlton, New South Wales, the son of Percy Charles Ramsden and his wife Kezia (née Clark). He was educated at Burwood Public School, New South Wales, Summer Hill Public School, Sydney, and Parramatta High School before attending St John's College, Morpeth where he studied theology. He was Curate of the NSW parish of Parkes in 1937 before becoming Rector of Geurie in 1939.

He was in the RAAF in World War Two from 1942 to 1945, serving in the South-West Pacific with the fighter wing of the American invasion. 1946 found him in Port Moresby, working for the Department of Native Labour and he resigned from church appointments in the same year. He was hospitalised as a result of the war in 1947–1949.

On 21 November 1946 he married Audrey V Mills and together had one son. He then married Marie Rush Myhill (née Stewart) (died 1985) and together had one son and two step-daughters. He died in 1986 at Greenslopes in Brisbane and was cremated.

== Public career ==
Ramsden, for the Liberal Party, won the seat of Merthyr in the Queensland Legislative Assembly at the 1957 state election. He held the seat until his retirement from politics in 1971. Reverend Ramsden suffered serious problems with his lungs which resulted in a substantial part of both lungs being removed while he was a member of parliament. This impeded his breathing and made it difficult for him to speak for any length of time or to sustain any physical exercise.

He was a member of many charitable organisations including being a past chairman and life member of the Multiple Handicapped Association of Queensland, past chairman of the Brisbane Missions to Seamen, past member and chairman of the Metropolitan Fire Brigades Board. He was also a past vice-patron of the Legion of Ex-Servicemen and Women and a Fellow of the Royal Commonwealth Society. Ramsden was also involved in sporting organisations including the Mayne Australian Football Club and Queensland Soccer.

Parliament of Queensland
Preceded by William Moore	Member for Merthyr; 1957–1971	Succeeded by Don Lane
