= Patrick Kerwin (politician) =

Australian politician

Dr. Patrick Kerwin

Member of the Queensland Legislative Assembly for Merthyr
- In office 11 May 1929 – 11 June 1932
- Preceded by: Peter McLachlan
- Succeeded by: James Keogh

Personal details
- Born: Patrick James Kerwin; 26 July 1873 Cork, Ireland
- Died: 2 September 1950 (aged 77) South Brisbane, Queensland, Australia
- Resting place: Nudgee Cemetery
- Party: CPNP
- Spouse: Mary Elizabeth Walsh (m.1903 d.1943)
- Occupation: Doctor

Patrick James Kerwin (26 July 1873 – 2 September 1950) was a member of the Queensland Legislative Assembly.

== Biography ==
Kerwin was born in Cork, Ireland, the son of Patrick Kerwin and his wife Catherine (née O'Rourke). He completed medical studies in Scotland and served as a ship's doctor before arriving in Northern Queensland in 1903. He then served with the Royal Army Medical Corps before becoming a practicing physician, first at Port Douglas for five years, then at Cairns for eleven years, then finally settling in Brisbane.

On 7 October 1903 Kerwin married Mary Elizabeth Walsh and together they had one daughter. He died in September 1950 and his funeral proceeded from the Holy Spirit Catholic Church, New Farm to the Nudgee Cemetery.

== Public career ==
Representing the CPNP, Kerwin won the seat of Merthyr in the Queensland Legislative Assembly in 1929, defeating the sitting member, Peter McLachlan of the Labor Party. He served one term before being defeated three years later by Labor's James Keogh.

Parliament of Queensland
Preceded by Peter McLachlan	Member for Merthyr; 1929–1932	Succeeded by James Keogh
