= Harry Wright (RAAF officer) =

- Born: 28 December 1919; New Farm, Queensland
- Died: 29 January 1991 (aged 71); Greenslopes, Queensland
- Military career
- Allegiance: Australia
- Branch: Royal Australian Air Force
- Service years: 1941–1945
- Rank: Flight Lieutenant
- Awards: Distinguished Flying Cross & Bar, Distinguished Flying Medal

Harold John Alfred Wright DFC & Bar, DFM (28 December 1919 – 29 January 1991) was an Australian air force officer and activist.

Wright was born in New Farm to artist Harold John Austin Wright and Kathleen May, née Bohan. He attended St Columban's College in Brisbane before working as a cadet draughtsman for the Queensland Irrigation and Water Supply Commission (QI&WSC). After serving briefly in the Citizen Military Force, he enlisted in the Royal Australian Air Force (RAAF) on 26 April 1941 and trained as a navigator. In September 1942 he was posted to the Royal Air Force's No. 103 Squadron and in April 1943 to No. 156 Squadron. He was awarded the Distinguished Flying Medal and then the Distinguished Flying Cross (DFC), both in 1943, and was also commissioned a pilot officer.

In April 1944, having volunteered for another tour, Wright was posted to No. 582 Squadron, where he flew twenty-one sorties in four months. He was awarded a Bar to his DFC in 1944, and in September was promoted to flight lieutenant. In October 1944 he returned to Australia, and in March 1945 transferred to the RAAF Reserve, working as a navigator for Qantas. He returned to work as a draughtsman after the death of his brother in April 1946.

Wright married Pauline Ruby Pike on 4 September 1948. He resigned from the QI&WSC in 1956, selling whitegoods before returning in the 1960s. He joined the Democratic Labour Party, which reflected his Catholic and anti-communist views, and passionately supported Australian involvement in the Vietnam War, forming Citizens for Freedom to support this cause. The Republic of China awarded him the Order of Brilliant Star (grade 5) for his activism supporting its diplomatic recognition. In 1979, he completed the degree he had abandoned to serve in the war, graduating with a Bachelor of Arts from the University of Queensland. In 1983 he published a novel, Pathfinders – Light the Way, which drew on his war experiences. Wright retired in 1984 and died of pneumonia in 1991 at Repatriation General Hospital, Greenslopes.
