= Santo Santoro =

Australian politician

The Honourable Santo Santoro
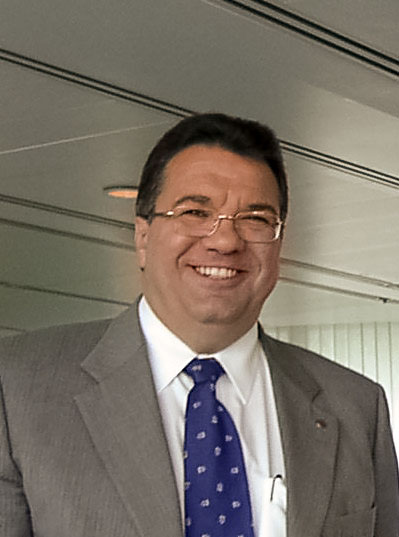
- Santoro in 2005

Minister for Ageing
- In office 27 January 2006 – 16 March 2007
- Prime Minister: John Howard
- Preceded by: Julie Bishop
- Succeeded by: Christopher Pyne

Senator for Queensland
- In office 29 October 2002 – 11 April 2007
- Preceded by: John Herron
- Succeeded by: Sue Boyce

Shadow Minister for Employment, Training, Industrial Relations of Queensland
- In office 2 July 1998 – 19 June 2000
- Leader: Rob Borbidge
- Preceded by: Paul Braddy
- Succeeded by: Joan Sheldon
- In office 2 November 1992 – 19 February 1996
- Leader: Rob Borbidge
- Preceded by: Mark Stoneman
- Succeeded by: Paul Braddy

Minister for Training and Industrial Relations of Queensland
- In office 26 February 1996 – 26 June 1998
- Premier: Rob Borbidge
- Preceded by: Wendy Edmond (Training); Matt Foley (Industrial Relations)
- Succeeded by: Paul Braddy

Deputy Leader of the Queensland Liberal Party
- In office 24 September 1992 – 31 July 1995
- Leader: Joan Sheldon
- Preceded by: David Watson
- Succeeded by: Denver Beanland

Member of the Queensland Legislative Assembly for Clayfield Merthyr (1989–1992)
- In office 13 May 1989 – 17 February 2001
- Preceded by: Don Lane
- Succeeded by: Liddy Clark

Personal details
- Born: 27 April 1956 (age 70) Sicily, Italy
- Party: Liberal Party of Australia
- Education: University of Queensland
- Occupation: Businessman

Santo Santoro (born 27 April 1956) is an Australian former politician and a former deputy leader of the Liberal Party in Queensland. He was a member of the Legislative Assembly of Queensland from 1989 to 2001, and a member of the Australian Senate from 2002 to 2007, representing the state of Queensland. He resigned from John Howard's ministry and the Senate after several breaches of the Ministerial Code of Conduct and the Register of Senators' Interests. He now works as a lobbyist.

== Early life ==
Born in Sicily, Italy in 1956, Santoro emigrated to Australia with his family at the age of 5. He was educated at Marist College Rosalie in Brisbane before attending the University of Queensland, where he was awarded the degrees of Bachelor of Arts and Bachelor of Economics with honours.

== Queensland state politics ==
Santoro was elected to the Legislative Assembly of Queensland as a Liberal member for Merthyr in Brisbane from 13 May 1989 until 19 September 1992. He first contested the seat at the 1986 state election against Liberal-turned-National incumbent and Transport Minister Don Lane, and finished third on the primary vote. However, he was only 30 votes behind the Labor challenger, so if 30 Australian Democrats voters had preferenced him ahead of Labor, he would have overtaken Labor for second place and defeated Lane on Labor preferences.

Lane was forced out of politics in January 1989 after admitting to rorting funds. Santoro then contested a by-election in May and was elected on National preferences. The by-election was the first sign of serious trouble for the National government, which was hemorrhaging support in the wake of the Fitzgerald Inquiry. At the state election later that year, Santoro was almost swept up in the massive Labor wave that swept through Brisbane; he only held on to his seat by 164 votes after all preferences were distributed, and was one of only five Liberals elected from Brisbane.

Merthyr was abolished in 1992, and Santoro followed most of his constituents into the re-created seat of Clayfield, which he held from 19 September 1992 until he was defeated on 17 February 2001 by Liddy Clark.

Santoro was the deputy leader of the State Liberal Party from 1992 to 1995. From 26 February 1996 to 26 June 1998, he was the State Minister for Training and Industrial Relations.

== Australian Senate ==
On 29 October 2002, Santoro was selected by the Queensland Parliament to replace Liberal Party of Australia Senator John Herron, who had resigned from the Senate to become Australia's Ambassador to Ireland.

As a senator, Santoro was a strident critic of the Australian Broadcasting Corporation, using parliamentary privilege in 2003 to accuse the national broadcaster of "sloppy and shoddy" journalism, and disloyalty to Australian soldiers serving in Iraq, after an internal memo to ABC news staff instructed them to refrain from referring to soldiers as "our troops".

Santoro was sworn in as Federal Minister for Ageing in John Howard's government on 27 January 2006.

== Share trading scandal and resignation ==
On 14 March 2007, Santoro disclosed that he had breached the government's ministerial code of conduct by holding shares in CBio, a biotechnology company related to his portfolio. Santoro claimed he had received the shares in January 2006, but had failed to declare or divest them when he became Minister for Ageing. He sold them in January 2007, after realising three months earlier that there might be a conflict of interest. Initially, Prime Minister John Howard and other government ministers defended the breach on the grounds that it was inadvertent.

On 20 March, Santoro announced he would resign from the Senate and federal politics altogether. That meant that he had served as a Commonwealth Minister without ever facing election. He was replaced in the Senate by Sue Boyce.

== Later career ==
Santoro was federal Liberal Party vice-president until 2014, when he resigned after being forced to choose between that role and being a paid lobbyist. He owns Santo Santoro Consulting and is registered as a lobbyist on both the Queensland and federal registers.

In 2010, it was reported that Santoro was considering a run for Italian politics. However, that never eventuated.

Parliament of Queensland
Preceded by Don Lane	Member for Merthyr; 1989–1992	Abolished
New seat	Member for Clayfield; 1992–2001	Succeeded by Liddy Clark
Parliament of Australia
Preceded by John Herron	Senator for Queensland; 2002–2007	Succeeded by Sue Boyce
Political offices
Preceded by Julie Bishop	Minister for Ageing; 2006–2007	Succeeded by Christopher Pyne
