= Ivan Brown (politician) =

Australian politician

Member of the Queensland Legislative Assembly for Clayfield
- In office 29 May 1976 – 12 May 1977
- Preceded by: John Murray
- Succeeded by: Seat abolished

Personal details
- Born: Ivan Milton Brown; 10 November 1922 Dromana, Victoria, Australia
- Died: 12 May 1977 (aged 54) Chermside, Queensland, Australia
- Party: Liberal Party
- Spouse: Elva Betty White
- Occupation: Businessman

Ivan Milton Brown (10 November 1922 – 19 May 1977) was an Australian politician. He was a Liberal Party member of the Legislative Assembly of Queensland from May 1976 until his sudden death in May 1977.

Brown was born in Dromana, Victoria. He served in World War II, serving in the Middle East and South Pacific from 1940 until 1945 with the 2/7th Australian Infantry Battalion. He was an electrical wholesaler and distributor and manufacturer's agent before entering politics. Brown was a member of the Liberal Party's state executive and the party's chairman in the federal seat of Lilley from 1973 to 1975, and was campaign director for a number of local, state and federal election campaigns.

He entered the Legislative Assembly in a heavily contested 1976 by-election for the seat of Clayfield, following the retirement of John Murray. Clayfield was normally a safe Liberal seat, but with growing internal tensions in the conservative coalition, Brown faced a concerted challenge from the National Party, who nominated their high-profile state secretary, Mike Evans. In a campaign described as "probably the most bitter and intense in recent political history in this state", the Labor candidate finished first, Brown second, and Evans third, with Brown elected on Evans' preferences.

Brown served for only eleven months before dying suddenly in office in May 1977. A second by-election was not held due to the proximity of the 1977 state election, when the Clayfield seat was abolished in a redistribution.

Parliament of Queensland
Preceded by John Murray	Member for Clayfield; 1976–1977	Succeeded by Seat abolished
