= John Murray (Queensland politician) =

Australian politician

John Murray MBE
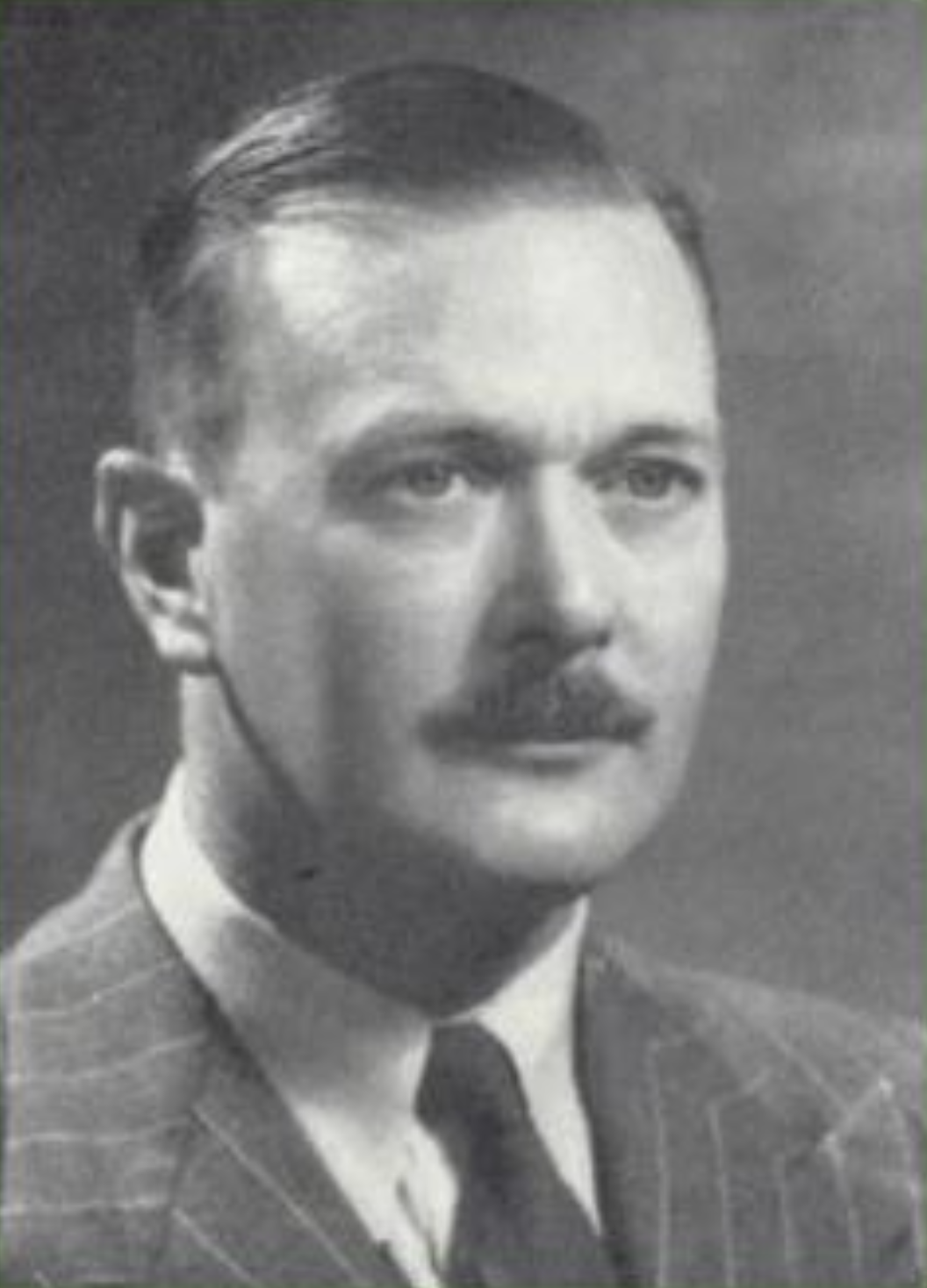

Member of the Australian Parliament for Herbert
- In office 22 November 1958 – 9 December 1961
- Preceded by: Bill Edmonds
- Succeeded by: Ted Harding

Member of the Queensland Legislative Assembly for Clayfield
- In office 1 June 1963 – 11 February 1976
- Preceded by: Harold Taylor
- Succeeded by: Ivan Brown

Personal details
- Born: John Chester Murray; 31 December 1915 Malvern, Victoria, Australia
- Died: 25 January 2009 (aged 93) Gold Coast, Queensland, Australia
- Party: Liberal Party of Australia
- Spouse: Ruth Florence Stanton-Cook (m.1944)
- Occupation: Soldier, Grazier

John Chester Murray, MBE (31 December 1915 – 25 January 2009) was an Australian politician.

Murray was born in Melbourne, the illegitimate son of a member of the prominent Chaffey family of Mildura, but raised in Sydney. He was educated at The King's School, Parramatta until forced to withdraw due to the Great Depression, after which he worked as a jackeroo, miner and drover for several years. In 1939, he enlisted for service in World War II with the Second Australian Imperial Force, serving with the 2/13th Battalion, 20th Brigade. He served in North Africa, becoming one of The Rats of Tobruk, and later in New Guinea and Borneo, rising to infantry section leader and intelligence officer. He leased his first grazing property, "Gidgee" in far western New South Wales in 1946, and bought his first property, "The Orient" in north Queensland, in 1951. As a grazier, he was a strong supporter of introducing Brahman cattle to north Queensland.

In 1958, Murray was elected to the Australian House of Representatives as the member for Herbert, having received the endorsement of both the Liberal Party and the Country Party. Once elected he sat as a Liberal. In federal parliament, he sat on the defence and foreign affairs committees. He was defeated in 1961, but in 1963 was elected to the Legislative Assembly of Queensland as the member for Clayfield, where he remained until 1976.

Murray died on the Gold Coast on 25 January 2009.

Parliament of Australia
Preceded by Bill Edmonds	Member for Herbert; 1958–1961	Succeeded by Ted Harding
Parliament of Queensland
Preceded by Harold Taylor	Member for Clayfield; 1963–1976	Succeeded by Ivan Brown
