= Electoral district of Merthyr =

Merthyr Queensland—Legislative Assembly
- State: Queensland
- Dates current: 1912–1992
- Namesake: Merthyr

Merthyr was an electoral district of the Legislative Assembly in the Australian state of Queensland from 1912 to 1992.

First created for the 1912 state election, the district was based in inner Brisbane centred on the suburb of New Farm, covering areas that previously belonged to the district of Fortitude Valley.

Merthyr was abolished by the 1991 redistribution, taking effect at the 1992 state election. Most of its territory was absorbed into the electorate of Brisbane Central with parts also added to the new district of Clayfield.

== Members for Merthyr ==
| Member | Party | Term |
|---|---|---|
| Thomas Welsby | Ministerialist | 1912–1915 |
| Peter McLachlan | Labor | 1915–1920 |
| Peter MacGregor | National | 1920–1923 |
| Peter McLachlan | Labor | 1923–1929 |
| Patrick Kerwin | Country and Progressive National | 1929–1932 |
| James Keogh | Labor | 1932–1940 |
| William Moore | Labor | 1940–1957 |
| William Moore | Queensland Labor | 1957 |
| Sam Ramsden | Liberal | 1957–1971 |
| Don Lane | Liberal | 1971–1983 |
| Don Lane | National | 1983–1989 |
| Santo Santoro | Liberal | 1989–1992 |

== See also ==
- Electoral districts of Queensland
- Members of the Queensland Legislative Assembly by year
- Category:Members of the Queensland Legislative Assembly by name
