= Electoral district of Clayfield =

State electoral district of Queensland, Australia

Clayfield Queensland—Legislative Assembly
- Map of the electoral district of Clayfield, 2017
- State: Queensland
- MP: Tim Nicholls
- Party: Liberal National
- Namesake: Clayfield
- Electors: 40,218 (2020)
- Area: 71 km^{2} (27.4 sq mi)
- Demographic: Inner-metropolitan
- Coordinates: 27°24′S 153°6′E
Electorates around Clayfield:
Stafford	Nudgee	Moreton Bay
Stafford	Clayfield	Lytton
McConnel	Bulimba	Lytton

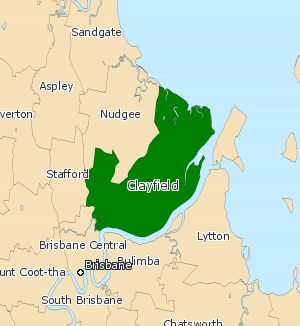
2008 map

Clayfield is an electoral division of the Legislative Assembly of Queensland. It is centred on the inner northern suburb of Clayfield in the state capital of Brisbane.

The seat was first created in 1950, and consistently returned members for the Liberal Party until its abolition in 1977. The bulk of the seat was merged into nearby Merthyr.

It was recreated in 1992 as part of the electoral reforms that ended the malapportionment of the Bjelke-Petersen era. Although it was created as a notionally Labor seat, it was located in ancestrally Liberal territory. The bulk of the seat came from the abolished Merthyr, and its last member, Liberal Santo Santoro, won the seat on a four percent swing. Santoro would go on to serve as a minister in the Borbidge government. Santoro was re-elected in 1996 and 1998, but was defeated in a shock result in 2001 by actress and Labor candidate Liddy Clark. Clark held on to the seat for two terms, but after a controversy-scarred term as a minister, was defeated by Liberal candidate Tim Nicholls in 2006.

A redistribution in 2008 made Clayfield notionally Labor by 0.2%, but the Liberal National Party achieved a swing strong enough for Nicholls to retain his seat in the 2009 election.

Nicholls was the last deputy leader of the state Liberal Party from 2007 to 2009, served as state Treasurer in the Newman government, and was leader of the LNP from 2016 to 2017.

== Members for Clayfield ==
First incarnation (1950–1977)
Member	Party	Term
Harold Taylor	Liberal	1950–1963
John Murray	Liberal	1963–1976
Ivan Brown	Liberal	1976–1977
Second incarnation (1992–present)
Member	Party	Term
Santo Santoro	Liberal	1992–2001
Liddy Clark	Labor	2001–2006
Tim Nicholls	Liberal	2006–2008
Tim Nicholls	Liberal National	2008–present

== Election results ==
2024 Queensland state election: Clayfield
Party	Candidate	Votes	%	±%
Liberal National	Tim Nicholls	17,591	47.37	+1.48
Labor	Belle Brookfield	10,905	29.37	−2.67
Greens	Jaimyn Mayer	6,490	17.48	−0.13
One Nation	Michelle Wilde	1,202	3.24	+0.89
Libertarian	Nick Buick	943	2.54	+2.54
Total formal votes		37,131	98.00	+0.02
Informal votes		758	2.00	−0.02
Turnout		37,889	89.36	+1.00
Two-party-preferred result
Liberal National	Tim Nicholls	19,881	53.54	+1.99
Labor	Belle Brookfield	17,250	46.46	−1.99
Liberal National hold		Swing	+1.99	

Primary vote results in Clayfield (Parties that have never gotten 5% of the vote are omitted)
Liberal/Liberal National
Labor
Greens
Katter's Australian
Australian Democrats
Independent
View source data.
Two-party-preferred vote results in Clayfield View source data.

2020 Queensland state election: Clayfield
Party	Candidate	Votes	%	±%
Liberal National	Tim Nicholls	15,979	45.89	−1.94
Labor	Philip Anthony	11,157	32.04	−0.84
Greens	Andrew Bartlett	6,132	17.61	−1.67
One Nation	Abby Douglas	817	2.35	+2.35
Independent Liberal Democrat	Robert King	478	1.37	+1.37
Civil Liberties & Motorists	Kathy Moloney	254	0.73	+0.73
Total formal votes		34,817	97.98	+1.74
Informal votes		719	2.02	−1.74
Turnout		35,536	88.36	+1.60
Two-party-preferred result
Liberal National	Tim Nicholls	17,949	51.55	−0.86
Labor	Philip Anthony	16,868	48.45	+0.86
Liberal National hold		Swing	−0.86	
