= Results of the 1957 Queensland state election =

Queensland state election, 3 August 1957 Legislative Assembly << 1956–1960 >>
Enrolled voters	747,455^{[1]}				
Votes cast	706,909		Turnout	94.58	+1.57
Informal votes	8,033		Informal	1.14	–0.07
Summary of votes by party
Party	Primary votes	%	Swing	Seats	Change
Labor	201,971	28.90	–22.32	20	–29
Queensland Labor	163,534	23.40	+23.40	11	+11
Liberal	162,372	23.23	–1.84	18	+10
Country	139,720	19.99	+0.72	24	+8
North Queensland Labor	7,488	1.07	–0.25	1	±0
Ind. Labor	2,257	0.32	+0.26	0	±0
Ind. Conservative	2,723	0.39	+0.39	0	±0
Independent	18,811	2.69	–0.17	1	±0
Total	698,876			75	

This is a list of electoral district results for the 1957 Queensland state election.

== Results by electoral district ==
=== Aubigny ===
1957 Queensland state election: Aubigny
Party	Candidate	Votes	%	±%
Country	Jim Sparkes	unopposed		
Country hold		Swing		

=== Balonne ===
1957 Queensland state election: Balonne
Party	Candidate	Votes	%	±%
Country	Eddie Beardmore	2,264	43.1	−0.2
Labor	John Taylor	1,988	37.9	−18.8
Queensland Labor	Henry Bunton	995	19.0	+19.0
Total formal votes		5,247	99.0	+0.2
Informal votes		54	1.0	−0.2
Turnout		5,301	91.3	+5.5
Country gain from Labor		Swing	+9.9	

=== Barambah ===
1957 Queensland state election: Barambah
Party	Candidate	Votes	%	±%
Country	Joh Bjelke-Petersen	6,503	70.4	−29.6
Queensland Labor	Thomas O'Neill	2,736	29.6	+29.6
Total formal votes		9,239	98.1	
Informal votes		107	1.9	
Turnout		9,346	95.9	
Country hold		Swing	−29.6	

=== Barcoo ===
1957 Queensland state election: Barcoo
Party	Candidate	Votes	%	±%
Labor	Ned Davis	1,971	40.8	−26.8
Queensland Labor	Stanley Barry	1,443	29.9	+29.9
Country	Raymond Paynter	1,419	29.4	−3.0
Total formal votes		4,833	99.4	+0.6
Informal votes		31	0.6	−0.6
Turnout		4,864	91.3	+3.9
Labor hold		Swing	−9.8	

=== Baroona ===
1957 Queensland state election: Baroona
Party	Candidate	Votes	%	±%
Queensland Labor	Bill Power	3,333	40.6	+40.6
Liberal	Robert Thomasson	2,691	32.8	−0.2
Labor	Norman Buchan	2,177	26.5	−38.3
Total formal votes		8,201	98.2	−0.3
Informal votes		149	1.8	+0.3
Turnout		8,350	93.0	+2.3
Queensland Labor gain from Labor		Swing	N/A	

=== Belyando ===
1957 Queensland state election: Belyando
Party	Candidate	Votes	%	±%
Queensland Labor	Tom Foley	1,841	38.6	+38.6
Country	Clarence Whyte	1,774	37.1	−4.2
Labor	John Williams	1,161	24.3	−34.4
Total formal votes		4,776	99.2	
Informal votes		39	0.8	
Turnout		4,815	91.9	
Queensland Labor gain from Labor		Swing	N/A	

=== Bremer ===
1957 Queensland state election: Bremer
Party	Candidate	Votes	%	±%
Labor	Jim Donald	6,692	59.7	−13.0
Liberal	George Groth	2,938	26.2	−1.1
Queensland Labor	Frank Corbutt	1,580	14.1	+14.1
Total formal votes		11,210	98.8	+0.2
Informal votes		132	1.2	−0.2
Turnout		11,342	95.9	+1.6
Labor hold		Swing	−3.2	

=== Brisbane ===
1957 Queensland state election: Brisbane
Party	Candidate	Votes	%	±%
Labor	Johnno Mann	2,744	38.4	−21.6
Queensland Labor	Daniel Casey	2,307	32.3	+32.3
Liberal	Roger Moore	2,087	29.2	−5.8
Total formal votes		7,138	98.0	−0.2
Informal votes		146	2.0	+0.2
Turnout		7,284	90.8	+4.0
Labor hold		Swing	−8.8	

=== Bulimba ===
1957 Queensland state election: Bulimba
Party	Candidate	Votes	%	±%
Labor	Jack Houston	4,993	37.0	−19.7
Liberal	Bill Lickiss	4,619	34.2	−6.5
Queensland Labor	Bob Gardner	3,891	28.8	+28.8
Total formal votes		13,503	99.1	+0.6
Informal votes		124	0.9	−0.6
Turnout		13,627	95.9	−0.9
Labor hold		Swing	−6.2	

=== Bundaberg ===
1957 Queensland state election: Bundaberg
Party	Candidate	Votes	%	±%
Queensland Labor	Ted Walsh	6,058	53.8	+53.8
Country	Thomas Pulsford	2,652	23.6	+23.6
Labor	William Elson-Green	2,543	22.6	−77.4
Total formal votes		11,253	99.4	
Informal votes		73	0.6	
Turnout		11,326	94.3	
Queensland Labor gain from Labor		Swing	N/A	

=== Buranda ===
1957 Queensland state election: Buranda
Party	Candidate	Votes	%	±%
Liberal	Keith Hooper	3,472	37.5	−7.0
Labor	Dick Brown	3,188	34.4	−21.1
Queensland Labor	Michael Lyons	2,113	22.8	+22.8
Independent	John Handasyde	484	5.2	+5.2
Total formal votes		9,257	99.2	+0.1
Informal votes		72	0.8	−0.1
Turnout		9,329	95.6	+1.5
Liberal gain from Labor		Swing	+7.6	

=== Burdekin ===
1957 Queensland state election: Burdekin
Party	Candidate	Votes	%	±%
Independent	Arthur Coburn	4,145	52.0	−11.9
Labor	John Grafton	2,268	28.5	−4.8
Queensland Labor	Oliver Andersen	1,560	19.6	+19.6
Total formal votes		7,973	99.3	+0.2
Informal votes		54	0.7	−0.2
Turnout		8,027	96.2	+1.3
Independent hold		Swing	−1.2	

=== Cairns ===
1957 Queensland state election: Cairns
Party	Candidate	Votes	%	±%
Labor	Watty Wallace	3,211	38.4	−20.5
Queensland Labor	James Bidner	2,687	32.2	+32.2
Country	Clement Cummings	2,455	29.4	+1.0
Total formal votes		8,353	99.0	+0.1
Informal votes		83	1.0	−0.1
Turnout		8,436	93.2	+3.0
Labor hold		Swing	−13.4	

=== Callide ===
1957 Queensland state election: Callide
Party	Candidate	Votes	%	±%
Country	Vince Jones	unopposed		
Country hold		Swing		

=== Carnarvon ===
1957 Queensland state election: Carnarvon
Party	Candidate	Votes	%	±%
Queensland Labor	Paul Hilton	4,517	46.2	+46.2
Country	Fred Rogers	3,911	40.0	−1.8
Labor	Douglas Gow	1,343	13.7	−44.5
Total formal votes		9,771	99.2	−0.1
Informal votes		77	0.8	+0.1
Turnout		9,848	93.9	+1.9
Queensland Labor gain from Labor		Swing	N/A	

=== Carpentaria ===
1957 Queensland state election: Carpentaria
Party	Candidate	Votes	%	±%
Queensland Labor	Norm Smith	2,832	38.6	+38.6
Labor	Alec Inch	2,292	31.3	−28.8
Country	William Aplin	2,211	30.1	−9.8
Total formal votes		7,335	99.2	+0.1
Informal votes		57	0.8	−0.1
Turnout		7,392	87.0	+5.7
Queensland Labor gain from Labor		Swing	N/A	

=== Charters Towers ===
1957 Queensland state election: Charters Towers
Party	Candidate	Votes	%	±%
Queensland Labor	Arthur Jones	1,837	43.8	+43.8
Liberal	Kieth Siemon	1,294	30.9	−1.5
Labor	Robert Davies	1,060	25.3	−42.3
Total formal votes		4,191	98.4	−0.6
Informal votes		68	1.6	+0.6
Turnout		4,259	95.4	+0.7
Queensland Labor gain from Labor		Swing	N/A	

=== Chermside ===
1957 Queensland state election: Chermside
Party	Candidate	Votes	%	±%
Liberal	Alex Dewar	9,476	54.1	−4.4
Labor	Leslie Sampson	4,487	25.6	−15.9
Queensland Labor	John Parry	3,546	20.3	+20.3
Total formal votes		17,509	98.9	+0.3
Informal votes		193	1.1	−0.3
Turnout		17,702	95.8	+1.6
Liberal hold		Swing	+9.4	

=== Clayfield ===
1957 Queensland state election: Clayfield
Party	Candidate	Votes	%	±%
Liberal	Harold Taylor	7,447	78.3	+4.3
Independent	James Ryan	2,065	21.7	−4.3
Total formal votes		9,512	97.2	−0.2
Informal votes		275	2.8	+0.2
Turnout		9,787	93.1	−2.9
Liberal hold		Swing	+4.3	

=== Condamine ===
1957 Queensland state election: Condamine
Party	Candidate	Votes	%	±%
Queensland Labor	Les Diplock	5,540	48.4	+48.4
Country	Stewart Keys	5,031	43.9	−1.2
Labor	William Eggington	879	7.7	−47.2
Total formal votes		9,083	99.5	0.0
Informal votes		56	0.5	0.0
Turnout		11,506	95.4	+2.0
Queensland Labor gain from Labor		Swing	N/A	

=== Cook ===
1957 Queensland state election: Cook
Party	Candidate	Votes	%	±%
Queensland Labor	Bunny Adair	4,013	44.2	+44.2
Country	Carlisle Wordsworth	3,463	38.1	+1.7
Labor	Seymour Chataway	1,607	17.7	−45.9
Total formal votes		9,083	99.1	+0.3
Informal votes		82	0.9	−0.3
Turnout		9,165	92.7	+3.5
Queensland Labor gain from Labor		Swing	N/A	

=== Cooroora ===
1957 Queensland state election: Cooroora
Party	Candidate	Votes	%	±%
Country	David Low	7,201	75.9	+7.7
Labor	Ralph Smith	2,283	24.1	−7.7
Total formal votes		9,484	98.4	−0.8
Informal votes		156	1.6	+0.8
Turnout		9,640	95.0	+0.9
Country hold		Swing	+7.7	

=== Coorparoo ===
1957 Queensland state election: Coorparoo
Party	Candidate	Votes	%	±%
Liberal	Thomas Hiley	8,543	70.6	+8.6
Labor	Bernard Ouston	3,559	29.4	−8.6
Total formal votes		12,102	97.4	−1.5
Informal votes		318	2.6	+1.5
Turnout		12,420	95.1	+0.6
Liberal hold		Swing	+8.6	

=== Cunningham ===
1957 Queensland state election: Cunningham
Party	Candidate	Votes	%	±%
Country	Alan Fletcher	7,054	67.0	+2.7
Independent	Leslie Ott	3,468	33.0	+33.0
Total formal votes		10,522	98.4	−0.9
Informal votes		175	1.6	+0.9
Turnout		10,697	96.4	+1.2
Country hold		Swing	+2.7	

=== Darlington ===
1957 Queensland state election: Darlington
Party	Candidate	Votes	%	±%
Country	Leslie Harrison	6,589	60.1	−7.8
Labor	Charles Knoll	2,227	20.3	−11.8
Independent	Michael Smith	1,874	17.1	+17.1
Independent	Henry Longfield	273	2.5	+2.5
Total formal votes		10,963	98.8	+0.1
Informal votes		128	1.2	−0.1
Turnout		11,091	93.9	+2.5
Country hold		Swing	+6.8	

=== Fassifern ===
1957 Queensland state election: Fassifern
Party	Candidate	Votes	%	±%
Country	Alf Muller	6,317	73.1	−26.9
Queensland Labor	Kenneth Rawle	2,329	26.9	+26.9
Total formal votes		8,646	98.2	
Informal votes		154	1.8	
Turnout		8,800	94.1	
Country hold		Swing	−26.9	

=== Fitzroy ===
1957 Queensland state election: Fitzroy
Party	Candidate	Votes	%	±%
Labor	Jim Clark	3,743	43.1	−19.5
Liberal	Gordon Dunn	2,693	31.0	−5.3
Queensland Labor	John Norton	2,255	25.9	+25.9
Total formal votes		8,691	99.3	+0.3
Informal votes		62	0.7	−0.3
Turnout		8,753	95.6	+0.1
Labor hold		Swing	−5.1	

=== Flinders ===
1957 Queensland state election: Flinders
Party	Candidate	Votes	%	±%
Country	Bill Longeran	1,441	34.4	−7.5
Labor	Frank Forde	1,440	34.4	−23.7
Queensland Labor	Bob Katter	1,079	25.8	+25.8
Independent	Charles Corney	225	5.4	+5.4
Total formal votes		4,185	99.2	−0.1
Informal votes		33	0.8	+0.1
Turnout		4,218	87.1	+4.0
Country gain from Labor		Swing	+8.1	

==== By-election ====
- This result was overturned by the Court of Disputed Returns and a by-election was held on 17 May 1958.

1958 Flinders state by-election
Party	Candidate	Votes	%	±%
Country	Bill Longeran	1,948	45.7	+11.3
Labor	Frank Forde	1,534	36.0	+1.6
Queensland Labor	Bob Katter	780	18.3	−7.5
Total formal votes		4,262	99.7	+0.5
Informal votes		11	0.3	−0.5
Turnout		4,273	82.0	−5.1
Country hold		Swing	N/A	

=== Fortitude Valley ===
1957 Queensland state election: Fortitude Valley
Party	Candidate	Votes	%	±%
Liberal	Bob Windsor	3,252	37.9	−2.6
Labor	Jack Egerton	2,752	32.0	−25.2
Queensland Labor	Mick Brosnan	2,586	30.1	+30.1
Total formal votes		8,590	98.9	0.0
Informal votes		96	1.1	0.0
Turnout		8,686	93.3	+1.6
Liberal gain from Labor		Swing	+12.7	

=== Gregory ===
The election in Gregory was delayed due to the death of incumbent MP George Devries weeks before the election. A supplementary election was held on 5 October, two months after the rest of the state.

1957 Queensland state election: Gregory
Party	Candidate	Votes	%	±%
Country	Wally Rae	2,075	47.6	+12.8
Labor	Jack Duggan	1,328	30.5	−34.8
Queensland Labor	Keith Smith	955	21.9	+21.9
Total formal votes		4,358	99.7	+0.4
Informal votes		12	0.3	−0.4
Turnout		4,370	84.6	−0.7
Country gain from Labor		Swing	+26.3	

=== Haughton ===
1957 Queensland state election: Haughton
Party	Candidate	Votes	%	±%
Queensland Labor	Colin McCathie	4,164	48.1	+48.1
Labor	Vivien Owens	2,393	27.6	−42.8
Country	William Clayton	2,105	24.3	+24.3
Total formal votes		8,662	99.3	+0.4
Informal votes		64	0.7	−0.4
Turnout		8,726	95.2	+0.5
Queensland Labor gain from Labor		Swing	N/A	

=== Hinchinbrook ===
1957 Queensland state election: Hinchinbrook
Party	Candidate	Votes	%	±%
Labor	Cecil Jesson	3,057	35.2	−16.9
Country	John Row	2,473	28.5	+28.5
Independent	Francis Curro	1,652	19.0	+19.0
Queensland Labor	John Argaet	1,497	17.3	+17.3
Total formal votes		8,679	98.4	−0.1
Informal votes		144	1.6	+0.1
Turnout		8,823	94.4	+1.8
Labor hold		Swing	+3.2	

=== Ipswich ===
1957 Queensland state election: Ipswich
Party	Candidate	Votes	%	±%
Labor	Ivor Marsden	4,320	45.6	−15.6
Liberal	Wylie Gibbs	3,179	33.5	−4.3
Queensland Labor	Robert Johnstone	1,982	20.9	+20.9
Total formal votes		9,481	99.4	+0.2
Informal votes		54	0.6	−0.2
Turnout		9,535	95.1	+1.2
Labor hold		Swing	−4.2	

=== Isis ===
1957 Queensland state election: Isis
Party	Candidate	Votes	%	±%
Country	Jack Pizzey	6,230	68.0	+5.7
Queensland Labor	Edward McDonnell	2,935	32.0	+32.0
Total formal votes		9,165	96.6	−2.0
Informal votes		324	3.4	+2.0
Turnout		9,489	96.1	+2.8
Country hold		Swing	+5.7	

=== Ithaca ===
1957 Queensland state election: Ithaca
Party	Candidate	Votes	%	±%
Labor	Pat Hanlon	4,222	43.9	−17.8
Liberal	Alan Edwards	3,638	37.8	−0.5
Queensland Labor	Anthony Machin	1,759	18.3	+18.3
Total formal votes		9,619	98.7	+0.1
Informal votes		123	1.3	−0.1
Turnout		9,489	96.1	+1.9
Labor hold		Swing	−8.0	

=== Kedron ===
1957 Queensland state election: Kedron
Party	Candidate	Votes	%	±%
Labor	Eric Lloyd	8,410	42.6	−18.4
Liberal	Joseph Harris	7,119	36.1	−2.9
Queensland Labor	Clive Uhr	4,203	21.3	+21.3
Total formal votes		19,732	99.0	+0.2
Informal votes		203	1.0	−0.2
Turnout		19,935	95.9	+0.7
Labor hold		Swing	−6.8	

=== Kelvin Grove ===
1957 Queensland state election: Kelvin Grove
Party	Candidate	Votes	%	±%
Liberal	Douglas Tooth	4,150	41.6	−4.1
Labor	Bert Turner	3,754	37.7	−16.6
Queensland Labor	John Dawson	2,061	20.7	+20.7
Total formal votes		9,965	99.0	−0.2
Informal votes		97	1.0	+0.2
Turnout		10,062	94.9	+1.0
Liberal gain from Labor		Swing	+6.8	

=== Keppel ===
1957 Queensland state election: Keppel
Party	Candidate	Votes	%	±%
Labor	Merv Thackeray	3,730	30.9	−27.6
Queensland Labor	Viv Cooper	3,151	26.1	+26.1
Liberal	Tom Griffith	3,063	25.3	−16.2
Independent	Rex Pilbeam	2,139	17.7	+17.7
Total formal votes		12,083	99.5	+0.3
Informal votes		58	0.5	−0.3
Turnout		12,141	96.2	+0.4
Labor hold		Swing	−4.3	

=== Kurilpa ===
1957 Queensland state election: Kurilpa
Party	Candidate	Votes	%	±%
Liberal	Peter Connolly	3,167	37.5	−5.2
Queensland Labor	Tom Moores	2,737	32.4	+32.4
Labor	Myles Kane	2,421	28.7	−28.6
Independent	George Fry	109	1.3	+1.3
Total formal votes		8,434	98.7	+0.3
Informal votes		113	1.3	−0.3
Turnout		8,547	93.2	+3.2
Liberal gain from Labor		Swing	+11.3	

=== Landsborough ===
1957 Queensland state election: Landsborough
Party	Candidate	Votes	%	±%
Country	Frank Nicklin	unopposed		
Country hold		Swing		

=== Lockyer ===
1957 Queensland state election: Lockyer
Party	Candidate	Votes	%	±%
Liberal	Gordon Chalk	7,600	78.9	−21.1
Independent	Jim Dwyer	2,032	21.1	+21.1
Total formal votes		9,632	98.2	
Informal votes		180	1.8	
Turnout		9,812	94.7	
Liberal hold		Swing	−21.1	

=== Mackay ===
1957 Queensland state election: Mackay
Party	Candidate	Votes	%	±%
Labor	Fred Graham	3,175	42.0	−16.0
Liberal	William Field	2,939	38.8	−0.7
Queensland Labor	Joseph Griffin	1,452	19.2	+19.2
Total formal votes		7,566	98.9	0.0
Informal votes		84	1.1	0.0
Turnout		7,650	95.2	+2.1
Labor hold		Swing	−7.9	

=== Mackenzie ===
1957 Queensland state election: Mackenzie
Party	Candidate	Votes	%	±%
Country	Nev Hewitt	2,523	55.1	+4.6
Labor	William James	1,140	24.9	−24.6
Queensland Labor	John Thomas Cook	920	20.1	+20.1
Total formal votes		4,583	99.2	+0.1
Informal votes		35	0.8	−0.1
Turnout		4,618	93.5	+4.0
Country hold		Swing	+18.4	

=== Marodian ===
1957 Queensland state election: Marodian
Party	Candidate	Votes	%	±%
Country	James Heading	6,307	75.3	−24.7
Labor	William Weir	2,073	24.7	+24.7
Total formal votes		8,380	98.4	
Informal votes		135	1.6	
Turnout		8,515	95.3	
Country hold		Swing	−24.7	

=== Maryborough ===
1957 Queensland state election: Maryborough
Party	Candidate	Votes	%	±%
Labor	Horace Davies	5,297	53.1	−13.1
Country	James Dunn	3,218	32.3	−1.5
Queensland Labor	Clement Gott	1,461	14.6	+14.6
Total formal votes		9,976	98.6	+0.1
Informal votes		142	1.4	−0.1
Turnout		10,118	96.6	+0.5
Labor hold		Swing	−4.0	

=== Merthyr ===
1957 Queensland state election: Merthyr
Party	Candidate	Votes	%	±%
Liberal	Sam Ramsden	3,151	37.0	−3.2
Queensland Labor	Bill Moore	3,028	35.6	+35.6
Labor	Tom Campbell	2,336	27.4	−32.4
Total formal votes		8,515	99.0	+0.4
Informal votes		88	1.0	−0.4
Turnout		8,603	94.1	+3.1
Liberal gain from Labor		Swing	N/A	

=== Mirani ===
1957 Queensland state election: Mirani
Party	Candidate	Votes	%	±%
Country	Ernie Evans	4,770	56.7	−2.5
Labor	James Chataway	1,889	22.5	−18.3
Queensland Labor	Waller O'Grady	1,749	20.8	+20.8
Total formal votes		8,408	99.0	+0.2
Informal votes		83	1.0	−0.2
Turnout		8,491	95.8	+1.7
Country hold		Swing	+12.4	

=== Mount Coot-tha ===
1957 Queensland state election: Mount Coot-tha
Party	Candidate	Votes	%	±%
Liberal	Kenneth Morris	8,723	58.4	−4.0
Labor	Desmond Raven	3,254	21.8	−15.8
Queensland Labor	John Lynch	2,967	19.8	+19.8
Total formal votes		14,944	99.0	+0.2
Informal votes		148	1.0	−0.2
Turnout		15,092	94.9	+0.8
Liberal hold		Swing	+10.4	

=== Mount Gravatt ===
1957 Queensland state election: Mount Gravatt
Party	Candidate	Votes	%	±%
Liberal	Graham Hart	10,562	39.7	−0.7
Labor	Felix Dittmer	10,434	39.3	−20.3
Queensland Labor	Charles Edwards	5,432	20.4	+20.4
Independent	Harold Boone	145	0.5	+0.5
Total formal votes		26,573	98.6	−0.2
Informal votes		370	1.4	+0.2
Turnout		26,943	95.2	+1.0
Liberal gain from Labor		Swing	+9.9	

=== Mourilyan ===
1957 Queensland state election: Mourilyan
Party	Candidate	Votes	%	±%
Labor	Peter Byrne	3,246	42.2	−17.3
Country	Edmund Webb	2,619	34.1	−4.1
Queensland Labor	Alfred Drew	1,740	22.6	+22.6
Independent	Cecil Evans	81	1.1	+1.1
Total formal votes		7,686	98.6	−0.3
Informal votes		112	1.4	+0.3
Turnout		7,798	95.9	+2.5
Labor hold		Swing	−5.5	

=== Mulgrave ===
1957 Queensland state election: Mulgrave
Party	Candidate	Votes	%	±%
Country	Bob Watson	3,407	45.2	−2.9
Queensland Labor	Charles English	2,331	31.0	+31.0
Labor	Leslie Trembath	1,792	23.8	−28.1
Total formal votes		7,530	99.0	+0.1
Informal votes		77	1.0	−0.1
Turnout		7,607	94.4	+1.0
Country gain from Labor		Swing	N/A	

==== By-election ====
- This by-election was caused by the death of Bob Watson. It was held on 6 June 1959.

1959 Mulgrave state by-election
Party	Candidate	Votes	%	±%
Country	Carlisle Wordsworth	3,281	47.1	+1.9
Labor	Leslie Trembath	2,331	33.5	+9.7
Queensland Labor	Charles English	1,349	19.4	−11.6
Total formal votes		6,961	98.9	−0.1
Informal votes		80	1.1	+0.1
Turnout		7,041	85.5	−8.9
Country hold		Swing	N/A	

=== Mundingburra ===
1957 Queensland state election: Mundingburra
Party	Candidate	Votes	%	±%
NQ Labor	Tom Aikens	7,488	75.1	−2.8
Labor	Jim Mahony	1,920	19.3	−2.8
Independent	George Fletcher Evans	564	5.6	+5.6
Total formal votes		9,972	98.7	+0.7
Informal votes		132	1.3	−0.7
Turnout		10,104	94.2	+0.6
NQ Labor hold		Swing	+1.7	

=== Murrumba ===
1957 Queensland state election: Murrumba
Party	Candidate	Votes	%	±%
Country	David Nicholson	9,112	61.8	−0.2
Labor	Bertram Krause	2,868	19.5	−18.5
Queensland Labor	Michael Ryan	2,756	18.7	+18.7
Total formal votes		14,736	98.9	+0.3
Informal votes		161	1.1	−0.3
Turnout		14,897	94.9	+1.2
Country hold		Swing	+14.1	

=== Nash ===
1957 Queensland state election: Nash
Party	Candidate	Votes	%	±%
Country	Max Hodges	4,331	41.5	−2.5
Queensland Labor	Greg Kehoe	3,696	35.4	+35.4
Labor	George Hooper	2,414	23.1	−32.9
Total formal votes		10,441	99.3	+0.3
Informal votes		78	0.7	−0.3
Turnout		10,519	96.8	+1.6
Country gain from Labor		Swing	N/A	

=== Norman ===
1957 Queensland state election: Norman
Party	Candidate	Votes	%	±%
Labor	Bill Baxter	4,478	41.1	−15.0
Liberal	George Regan	4,376	40.2	−3.7
Queensland Labor	Norman Tacey	2,033	18.7	+18.7
Total formal votes		10,887	98.7	−0.2
Informal votes		148	1.3	+0.2
Turnout		11,035	95.6	+1.1
Labor hold		Swing	−5.5	

=== North Toowoomba ===
1957 Queensland state election: North Toowoomba
Party	Candidate	Votes	%	±%
Labor	Les Wood	4,183	44.3	−14.7
Liberal	Herbert Yeates	3,610	38.2	−2.8
Queensland Labor	Francis Bowdler	1,646	17.4	+17.4
Total formal votes		9,439	99.3	+0.4
Informal votes		64	0.7	−0.4
Turnout		9,503	94.5	+1.7
Labor hold		Swing	−5.3	

==== By-election ====
- This by-election was caused by the death of Les Wood. It was held on 31 May 1958.

1958 North Toowoomba state by-election
Party	Candidate	Votes	%	±%
Labor	Jack Duggan	5,765	63.0	+18.7
Liberal	Geoffrey Godsall	2,912	31.8	−6.4
Queensland Labor	Tim Whittaker	471	5.2	−12.2
Total formal votes		9,148	99.0	−0.3
Informal votes		89	1.0	+0.3
Turnout		9,237	92.8	−1.7
Labor hold		Swing	N/A	

=== Nundah ===
1957 Queensland state election: Nundah
Party	Candidate	Votes	%	±%
Liberal	William Knox	4,421	39.3	−5.2
Queensland Labor	Jim Hadley	3,526	31.3	+31.3
Labor	Dudley Ryder	3,307	29.4	−26.1
Total formal votes		11,254	98.9	+0.4
Informal votes		124	1.1	−0.4
Turnout		11,378	95.4	+0.6
Liberal gain from Labor		Swing	N/A	

=== Port Curtis ===
1957 Queensland state election: Port Curtis
Party	Candidate	Votes	%	±%
Labor	Jim Burrows	4,757	49.4	−15.1
Country	Colin Wilson	3,460	35.9	+0.4
Queensland Labor	Samuel Andrewartha	1,412	14.7	+14.7
Total formal votes		9,629	99.5	+0.2
Informal votes		46	0.5	−0.2
Turnout		9,675	96.2	+1.6
Labor hold		Swing	−6.6	

=== Rockhampton ===
1957 Queensland state election: Rockhampton
Party	Candidate	Votes	%	±%
Queensland Labor	Mick Gardner	3,245	36.3	+36.3
Liberal	James Marshall	2,589	29.0	−20.3
Labor	James Fraser	2,203	24.6	−25.4
Independent	Rex Pilbeam	895	10.0	+10.0
Independent	Thomas Kelly	9	0.1	+0.1
Total formal votes		8,941	99.4	+0.4
Informal votes		51	0.6	−0.4
Turnout		8,992	95.7	+0.2
Queensland Labor gain from Labor		Swing	N/A	

=== Roma ===
1957 Queensland state election: Roma
Party	Candidate	Votes	%	±%
Country	William Ewan	2,568	46.1	−3.8
Queensland Labor	Alfred Dohring	2,006	36.0	+36.0
Labor	William Hay	855	15.4	−34.7
Independent	James Clarke	141	2.5	+2.5
Total formal votes		5,570	99.2	−0.2
Informal votes		43	0.8	+0.2
Turnout		5,613	94.8	+1.3
Country gain from Labor		Swing	N/A	

=== Sandgate ===
1957 Queensland state election: Sandgate
Party	Candidate	Votes	%	±%
Liberal	Thomas Ahearn	6,620	37.2	−6.2
Labor	Harry Dean	6,323	35.5	−21.1
Queensland Labor	Herbert Robinson	4,867	27.3	+27.3
Total formal votes		17,810	99.0	+0.2
Informal votes		173	1.0	−0.2
Turnout		17,983	95.3	+2.0
Liberal gain from Labor		Swing	+7.7	

=== Sherwood ===
1957 Queensland state election: Sherwood
Party	Candidate	Votes	%	±%
Liberal	John Herbert	8,934	49.3	−1.8
Labor	Doug Sherrington	5,810	32.1	−13.1
Queensland Labor	Harry Wright	3,381	18.7	+18.7
Total formal votes		18,125	98.9	+1.9
Informal votes		198	1.1	−1.9
Turnout		18,323	94.4	+0.5
Liberal hold		Swing	+7.6	

=== Somerset ===
1957 Queensland state election: Somerset
Party	Candidate	Votes	%	±%
Country	Harold Richter	3,700	41.0	−3.1
Queensland Labor	Alexander Skinner	3,246	36.0	+36.0
Labor	Evan Marginson	2,078	23.0	−32.9
Total formal votes		9,024	99.5	+0.2
Informal votes		42	0.5	−0.2
Turnout		9,066	95.4	+0.7
Country gain from Labor		Swing	N/A	

=== South Brisbane ===
1957 Queensland state election: South Brisbane
Party	Candidate	Votes	%	±%
Queensland Labor	Vince Gair	3,598	44.1	+44.1
Liberal	William Henry	2,593	31.8	+31.8
Labor	Tom Doyle	1,974	24.2	−34.4
Total formal votes		8,165	98.7	+0.2
Informal votes		104	1.3	−0.2
Turnout		8,269	93.7	+1.8
Queensland Labor gain from Labor		Swing	N/A	

=== Southport ===
1957 Queensland state election: Southport
Party	Candidate	Votes	%	±%
Country	Eric Gaven	9,650	73.9	+7.9
Labor	William Bedford	3,401	26.1	−7.9
Total formal votes		13,051	98.8	−0.6
Informal votes		154	1.2	+0.6
Turnout		13,205	93.9	+2.2
Country hold		Swing	+7.9	

=== Tablelands ===
1957 Queensland state election: Tablelands
Party	Candidate	Votes	%	±%
Country	Tom Gilmore	3,359	37.5	+3.9
Queensland Labor	Harold Collins	3,279	36.6	+36.6
Labor	Sidney Tullipan	2,321	25.9	−40.5
Total formal votes		8,959	99.3	+0.4
Informal votes		64	0.7	−0.4
Turnout		9,023	92.3	+1.7
Country gain from Labor		Swing	N/A	

=== Toowong ===
1957 Queensland state election: Toowong
Party	Candidate	Votes	%	±%
Liberal	Alan Munro	unopposed		
Liberal hold		Swing		

=== Toowoomba ===
1957 Queensland state election: Toowoomba
Party	Candidate	Votes	%	±%
Liberal	Mervyn Anderson	4,031	41.3	+4.3
Labor	Jack Duggan	3,781	38.7	−24.3
Queensland Labor	Thomas Desmond McCawley	1,654	16.9	+16.9
Independent	Vera Lacaze	301	3.1	+3.1
Total formal votes		9,767	99.5	+0.8
Informal votes		49	0.5	−0.8
Turnout		9,816	94.5	+1.8
Liberal gain from Labor		Swing	+14.6	

=== Townsville ===
1957 Queensland state election: Townsville
Party	Candidate	Votes	%	±%
Labor	George Keyatta	2,631	40.1	−6.8
Liberal	Roy Pope	2,290	34.9	−1.3
Queensland Labor	Lionel Tomlins	1,637	25.0	+25.0
Total formal votes		6,558	98.4	−0.7
Informal votes		105	1.6	+0.7
Turnout		6,663	92.2	+1.1
Labor hold		Swing	−2.9	

=== Warrego ===
1957 Queensland state election: Warrego
Party	Candidate	Votes	%	±%
Labor	John Dufficy	2,358	44.8	−22.9
Country	Arnold White	1,550	29.4	−2.9
Queensland Labor	John Glynn	1,361	25.8	+25.8
Total formal votes		5,269	99.0	+0.6
Informal votes		53	1.0	−0.6
Turnout		5,322	89.4	+4.6
Labor hold		Swing	−7.4	

=== Warwick ===
1957 Queensland state election: Warwick
Party	Candidate	Votes	%	±%
Country	Otto Madsen	5,695	65.3	+1.7
Queensland Labor	George Wilkinson	3,026	34.7	+34.7
Total formal votes		8,721	98.4	−0.7
Informal votes		142	1.6	+0.7
Turnout		8,863	95.8	−0.4
Country hold		Swing	+1.7	

=== Whitsunday ===
1957 Queensland state election: Whitsunday
Party	Candidate	Votes	%	±%
Country	Lloyd Roberts	4,861	55.3	−4.1
Labor	Ralph Staples	2,555	29.1	−11.5
Queensland Labor	Bernard Lewis	1,374	15.6	+15.6
Total formal votes		8,790	98.9	+0.3
Informal votes		94	1.1	−0.3
Turnout		8,884	95.0	+1.8
Country hold		Swing	+6.1	

=== Windsor ===
1957 Queensland state election: Windsor
Party	Candidate	Votes	%	±%
Liberal	Ray Smith	3,760	38.9	−4.8
Queensland Labor	Tom Rasey	3,733	38.6	+38.6
Labor	Kenneth Kemshead	2,165	22.4	−33.9
Total formal votes		9,658	99.0	+0.2
Informal votes		100	1.0	−0.2
Turnout		9,758	95.3	+0.7
Liberal gain from Labor		Swing	N/A	

=== Wynnum ===
1957 Queensland state election: Wynnum
Party	Candidate	Votes	%	±%
Labor	Bill Gunn	7,807	52.3	−13.1
Liberal	Peter McAdam	5,170	34.6	0.0
Queensland Labor	James Pendergast	1,821	12.2	+12.2
Independent	William St George-Grambauer	126	0.8	+0.8
Total formal votes		14,924	98.9	+0.2
Informal votes		170	1.1	−0.2
Turnout		15,094	95.1	+2.0
Labor hold		Swing	−5.2	

=== Yeronga ===
1957 Queensland state election: Yeronga
Party	Candidate	Votes	%	±%
Liberal	Winston Noble	6,660	54.6	−3.3
Labor	Roy Dent	2,903	23.8	−16.7
Queensland Labor	William Quaill	2,635	21.6	+21.6
Total formal votes		12,198	99.2	+0.2
Informal votes		98	0.8	−0.2
Turnout		12,296	95.7	+1.6
Liberal hold		Swing	+10.7	

== See also ==
- 1957 Queensland state election
- Candidates of the Queensland state election, 1957
- Members of the Queensland Legislative Assembly, 1957-1960
