= Electoral results for the district of Mulgrave (Queensland) =

Queensland, Australia, district election results

This is a list of electoral results for the electoral district of Mulgrave in Queensland state elections.

== Members for Mulgrave ==
First incarnation (1873–1888)
Member	Party	Term
Walter Jervoise Scott	Squatter conservative	1873–1878
Thomas McIlwraith	Conservative leader	1878–1886
Walter Adams	Unaligned	1886–1888
Second incarnation (1950–present)
Member	Party	Term
Robert Watson	Country	1950–1953
Charles English	Labor	1953–1957
Charles English	Queensland Labor	1957
Robert Watson	Country	1957–1959
Carlisle Wordsworth	Country	1959–1960
Roy Armstrong	Country	1960–1974
Roy Armstrong	National	1974–1980
Max Menzel	National	1980–1989
Warren Pitt	Labor	1989–1995
Naomi Wilson	National	1995–1998
Charles Rappolt	One Nation	1998
Warren Pitt	Labor	1998–2009
Curtis Pitt	Labor	2009–2024
Terry James	Liberal National	2024–present

== Election results ==
=== Elections in the 2020s ===
2024 Queensland state election: Mulgrave
Party	Candidate	Votes	%	±%
Liberal National	Terry James	8,369	27.44	+1.74
Labor	Richie Bates	7,384	24.21	−25.59
Katter's Australian	Steven Lesina	4,934	16.18	+4.28
One Nation	Michael McInnes	2,654	8.70	+2.30
Independent	David Raymond	2,056	6.74	+6.74
Legalise Cannabis	Nicholas Daniels	1,804	5.92	+5.92
Greens	Peter Everett	1,289	4.23	−1.97
Independent	Yodie Batzke	1,044	3.42	+3.42
Family First	Leslie Searle	593	2.0	+2.0
Independent	Ian Floyd	370	1.21	+1.21
Total formal votes		30,497	93.51	
Informal votes		2,115	6.51	
Turnout		32,612	81.75	
Two-party-preferred result
Liberal National	Terry James	16,066	52.68	+14.88
Labor	Richie Bates	14,431	47.28	−14.88
Liberal National gain from Labor		Swing	+14.88	

2020 Queensland state election: Mulgrave
Party	Candidate	Votes	%	±%
Labor	Curtis Pitt	14,254	49.86	+1.76
Liberal National	Gerry Vallianos	7,341	25.68	+2.87
Katter's Australian	Attila Feher-Holan	3,395	11.88	+11.88
One Nation	Francis Bartorillo	1,825	6.38	−15.96
Greens	Sue Cory	1,772	6.20	−0.54
Total formal votes		28,587	95.79	+0.68
Informal votes		1,256	4.21	−0.68
Turnout		29,843	83.75	−1.00
Two-party-preferred result
Labor	Curtis Pitt	17,793	62.24	+1.32
Liberal National	Gerry Vallianos	10,794	37.76	−1.32
Labor hold		Swing	+1.32	

=== Elections in the 2010s ===
2017 Queensland state election: Mulgrave
Party	Candidate	Votes	%	±%
Labor	Curtis Pitt	13,256	48.1	−2.8
Liberal National	Karina Samperi	6,287	22.8	−8.6
One Nation	Sue Bertuch	6,158	22.3	+22.3
Greens	Carmel Murray	1,857	6.7	+2.7
Total formal votes		27,558	95.1	−2.6
Informal votes		1,416	4.9	+2.6
Turnout		28,974	84.7	−0.6
Two-party-preferred result
Labor	Curtis Pitt	16,789	60.9	−2.0
Liberal National	Karina Samperi	10,769	39.1	+2.0
Labor hold		Swing	−2.0	

2015 Queensland state election: Mulgrave
Party	Candidate	Votes	%	±%
Labor	Curtis Pitt	13,605	51.05	+16.55
Liberal National	Robyn Quick	8,334	31.27	−0.73
Palmer United	Christian Wolff	2,821	10.59	+10.59
Greens	Henry Boer	1,021	3.83	+0.28
Independent	Damian Byrnes	867	3.25	+3.25
Total formal votes		26,648	97.73	−0.40
Informal votes		618	2.27	+0.40
Turnout		27,266	88.66	−1.71
Two-party-preferred result
Labor	Curtis Pitt	15,516	62.76	+11.62
Liberal National	Robyn Quick	9,205	37.24	−11.62
Labor hold		Swing	+11.62	

2012 Queensland state election: Mulgrave
Party	Candidate	Votes	%	±%
Labor	Curtis Pitt	8,739	34.50	−13.51
Liberal National	Robyn Quick	8,105	32.00	−1.44
Katter's Australian	Damian Byrnes	7,585	29.95	+29.95
Greens	Jim Cavill	899	3.55	−2.06
Total formal votes		25,328	98.13	+0.50
Informal votes		482	1.87	−0.50
Turnout		25,810	90.36	+0.06
Two-party-preferred result
Labor	Curtis Pitt	10,514	51.15	−6.93
Liberal National	Robyn Quick	10,043	48.85	+6.93
Labor hold		Swing	−6.93	

=== Elections in the 2000s ===
2009 Queensland state election: Mulgrave
Party	Candidate	Votes	%	±%
Labor	Curtis Pitt	11,754	48.0	−11.8
Liberal National	Vic Black	8,186	33.4	−6.8
Independent	Damian Byrnes	3,168	12.9	+12.9
Greens	Hugh Whitehouse	1,373	5.6	+5.6
Total formal votes		24,481	97.3	
Informal votes		594	2.7	
Turnout		25,075	90.3	
Two-party-preferred result
Labor	Curtis Pitt	12,876	58.1	−1.7
Liberal National	Vic Black	9,293	41.9	+1.7
Labor hold		Swing	−1.7	

2006 Queensland state election: Mulgrave
Party	Candidate	Votes	%	±%
Labor	Warren Pitt	14,081	59.9	+8.5
National	Krista Dunford	9,418	40.1	+5.5
Total formal votes		23,499	97.6	−0.4
Informal votes		582	2.4	+0.4
Turnout		24,081	89.6	−2.0
Labor hold		Swing	+2.2	

2004 Queensland state election: Mulgrave
Party	Candidate	Votes	%	±%
Labor	Warren Pitt	11,926	51.4	−2.2
National	Desley Vella	8,043	34.6	+14.6
One Nation	Arietta Mitchell	2,654	11.4	−14.9
Independent	Dominic Frisone	590	2.5	+2.5
Total formal votes		23,213	98.0	−0.3
Informal votes		474	2.0	+0.3
Turnout		23,687	91.6	−0.5
Two-party-preferred result
Labor	Warren Pitt	12,441	57.7	−3.6
National	Desley Vella	9,113	42.3	+42.3
Labor hold		Swing	−3.6	

2001 Queensland state election: Mulgrave
Party	Candidate	Votes	%	±%
Labor	Warren Pitt	11,903	53.6	+15.1
One Nation	Dominic Frisone	5,847	26.3	−3.7
National	Barry Moyle	4,443	20.0	−9.3
Total formal votes		22,193	98.3	
Informal votes		383	1.7	
Turnout		22,576	92.1	
Two-candidate-preferred result
Labor	Warren Pitt	12,512	61.3	+14.0
One Nation	Dominic Frisone	7,903	38.7	−14.0
Labor hold		Swing	+14.0	

=== Elections in the 1990s ===
1998 Mulgrave state by-election
Party	Candidate	Votes	%	±%
Labor	Warren Pitt	9,446	42.35	+5.33
National	Naomi Wilson	8,550	38.33	+8.38
One Nation	Peter Boniface	3,470	15.56	−15.48
Greens	Jonathan Metcalfe	573	2.57	+2.57
Independent	Norm Mathison	266	1.19	+1.19
Total formal votes		22,205	98.99	
Informal votes		228	1.01	
Turnout		22,433	85.83	
Two-party-preferred result
Labor	Warren Pitt	10,394	50.63	+4.8
National	Naomi Wilson	10,135	49.37	+49.37
Labor gain from One Nation		Swing	N/A	

1998 Queensland state election: Mulgrave
Party	Candidate	Votes	%	±%
Labor	Warren Pitt	8,464	37.0	−8.2
One Nation	Charles Rappolt	7,097	31.0	+31.0
National	Naomi Wilson	6,848	29.9	−16.0
Democrats	Jo Gallo	457	2.0	−1.4
Total formal votes		22,866	98.8	+0.4
Informal votes		281	1.2	−0.4
Turnout		23,147	92.9	+2.2
Two-candidate-preferred result
One Nation	Charles Rappolt	11,694	54.1	+54.1
Labor	Warren Pitt	9,903	45.9	−3.7
One Nation gain from National		Swing	+54.1	

1995 Queensland state election: Mulgrave
Party	Candidate	Votes	%	±%
National	Naomi Wilson	9,214	46.0	+16.0
Labor	Warren Pitt	9,056	45.2	−3.0
Greens	Jonathan Metcalfe	1,094	5.5	+5.5
Democrats	Sonya Kremser	676	3.4	+3.4
Total formal votes		20,040	98.4	+0.4
Informal votes		325	1.6	−0.4
Turnout		20,365	90.7	
Two-party-preferred result
National	Naomi Wilson	9,932	50.5	+3.6
Labor	Warren Pitt	9,748	49.5	−3.6
National gain from Labor		Swing	+3.6	

1992 Queensland state election: Mulgrave
Party	Candidate	Votes	%	±%
Labor	Warren Pitt	8,666	48.2	−7.3
National	John Rossi	5,388	30.0	−13.0
Independent	Max Menzel	2,230	12.4	+12.4
Liberal	Scott Sturgess	1,703	9.5	+9.5
Total formal votes		17,987	98.0	
Informal votes		365	2.0	
Turnout		18,352	90.5	
Two-party-preferred result
Labor	Warren Pitt	9,256	53.2	−2.8
National	John Rossi	8,153	46.8	+2.8
Labor hold		Swing	−2.8	

=== Elections in the 1980s ===
1989 Queensland state election: Mulgrave
Party	Candidate	Votes	%	±%
Labor	Warren Pitt	7,350	51.7	+10.7
National	Max Menzel	6,876	48.3	+5.2
Total formal votes		14,226	95.9	−2.4
Informal votes		614	4.1	+2.4
Turnout		12,489	91.6	+0.6
Labor gain from National		Swing	+5.4	

1986 Queensland state election: Mulgrave
Party	Candidate	Votes	%	±%
National	Max Menzel	5,286	43.0	−13.1
Labor	Warren Pitt	5,030	41.0	−0.2
Liberal	Andrew Rankine	1,963	16.0	+16.0
Total formal votes		12,279	98.3	
Informal votes		210	1.7	
Turnout		12,489	91.6	
Two-party-preferred result
National	Max Menzel	6,595	53.7	−0.2
Labor	Warren Pitt	5,684	46.3	+0.2
National hold		Swing	−0.2	

1983 Queensland state election: Mulgrave
Party	Candidate	Votes	%	±%
National	Max Menzel	6,769	56.1	+11.5
Labor	George Pervan	4,970	41.2	+3.1
Independent	Leslie Webber	320	2.7	+2.7
Total formal votes		12,059	98.9	−0.2
Informal votes		132	1.1	+0.2
Turnout		12,191	91.9	+1.1
Two-party-preferred result
National	Max Menzel	6,929	57.5	+1.0
Labor	George Pervan	5,130	42.5	−1.0
National hold		Swing	+1.0	

1980 Queensland state election: Mulgrave
Party	Candidate	Votes	%	±%
National	Max Menzel	4,739	44.6	−13.8
Labor	James Moses	4,041	38.1	−3.5
Liberal	Jean Huxley	1,840	17.3	+17.3
Total formal votes		10,620	99.1	+0.7
Informal votes		96	0.9	−0.7
Turnout		10,716	90.8	−1.5
Two-party-preferred result
National	Max Menzel	5,995	56.5	−1.9
Labor	James Moses	4,625	43.5	+1.9
National hold		Swing	−1.9	

=== Elections in the 1970s ===
1977 Queensland state election: Mulgrave
Party	Candidate	Votes	%	±%
National	Roy Armstrong	5,629	58.4	−6.4
Labor	Andrew Eaton	4,016	41.6	+6.4
Total formal votes		9,645	98.4	
Informal votes		156	1.6	
Turnout		9,801	92.3	
National hold		Swing	−6.4	

1974 Queensland state election: Mulgrave
Party	Candidate	Votes	%	±%
National	Roy Armstrong	6,023	64.8	+6.4
Labor	Louie Tognola	3,269	35.2	−6.4
Total formal votes		9,292	98.4	+0.3
Informal votes		152	1.6	−0.3
Turnout		9,444	91.9	−0.7
National hold		Swing	+6.4	

1972 Queensland state election: Mulgrave
Party	Candidate	Votes	%	±%
Country	Roy Armstrong	4,952	58.4	+3.7
Labor	Leslie Scheu	3,530	41.6	−3.7
Total formal votes		8,482	98.1	
Informal votes		161	1.9	
Turnout		8,643	92.6	
Country hold		Swing	+3.7	

=== Elections in the 1960s ===
1969 Queensland state election: Mulgrave
Party	Candidate	Votes	%	±%
Country	Roy Armstrong	3,926	59.8	+1.6
Labor	Leslie Trembath	2,640	40.2	−1.6
Total formal votes		6,566	98.2	−0.4
Informal votes		117	1.8	+0.4
Turnout		6,683	93.5	0.0
Country hold		Swing	+1.6	

1966 Queensland state election: Mulgrave
Party	Candidate	Votes	%	±%
Country	Roy Armstrong	3,809	58.2	+0.6
Labor	Stanley Dalton	2,733	41.8	+6.3
Total formal votes		6,542	98.6	+0.8
Informal votes		90	1.4	−0.8
Turnout		6,632	93.5	−0.6
Country hold		Swing	−5.1	

1963 Queensland state election: Mulgrave
Party	Candidate	Votes	%	±%
Country	Roy Armstrong	3,703	57.6	+8.5
Labor	Stanley Scoines	2,278	35.5	+8.3
Queensland Labor	Charles English	444	6.9	−4.4
Total formal votes		6,425	97.8	−1.1
Informal votes		143	2.2	+1.1
Turnout		6,568	94.1	+5.3
Two-party-preferred result
Country	Roy Armstrong	4,064	63.3	
Labor	Stanley Scoines	2,361	36.7	
Country hold		Swing	N/A	

1960 Queensland state election: Mulgrave
Party	Candidate	Votes	%	±%
Country	Roy Armstrong	3,113	49.1	
Labor	Stanley Scoines	1,723	27.2	
Independent	James Hesp	787	12.4	
Queensland Labor	Charles English	714	11.3	
Total formal votes		6,337	98.9	
Informal votes		68	1.1	
Turnout		6,405	88.8	
Country hold		Swing		

=== Elections in the 1950s ===
1957 Queensland state election: Mulgrave
Party	Candidate	Votes	%	±%
Country	Robert Watson	3,407	45.2	−2.9
Queensland Labor	Charles English	2,331	31.0	+31.0
Labor	Leslie Trembath	1,792	23.8	−28.1
Total formal votes		7,530	99.0	+0.1
Informal votes		77	1.0	−0.1
Turnout		7,607	94.4	+1.0
Country gain from Labor		Swing	N/A	

1956 Queensland state election: Mulgrave
Party	Candidate	Votes	%	±%
Labor	Charles English	3,821	51.9	+0.8
Country	Robert Watson	3,547	48.1	−0.8
Total formal votes		7,368	98.9	+0.3
Informal votes		80	1.1	−0.3
Turnout		7,448	93.4	+0.5
Labor hold		Swing	+0.8	

1953 Queensland state election: Mulgrave
Party	Candidate	Votes	%	±%
Labor	Charles English	3,716	51.1	+7.1
Country	Robert Watson	3,553	48.9	+0.1
Total formal votes		7,269	98.7	−0.2
Informal votes		99	1.3	+0.2
Turnout		7,368	92.9	+2.0
Labor gain from Country		Swing	+3.7	

1950 Queensland state election: Mulgrave
Party	Candidate	Votes	%	±%
Country	Robert Watson	3,559	48.8	
Labor	Charles English	3,208	44.0	
NQ Labor	George Groth	345	4.7	
Communist	Frank Falls	175	2.4	
Total formal votes		7,287	98.9	
Informal votes		84	1.1	
Turnout		7,371	90.9	
Country hold		Swing		
