= Candidates of the 1960 Queensland state election =

The 1960 Queensland state election was held on 28 May 1960.

== By-elections ==
- On 31 May 1958, Jack Duggan (Labor) was elected to succeed Les Wood (Labor), who had died on 29 March 1958, as the member for North Toowoomba.
- On 6 June 1959, Carlisle Wordsworth (Country) was elected to succeed Bob Watson (Country), who had died on 26 March 1959, as the member for Mulgrave. However, he himself died on 7 May 1960.

== Retiring Members ==
- Note: Mulgrave Country MLA Carlisle Wordsworth had died before the election; no by-election was held.

=== Labor ===
- George Keyatta MLA (Townsville)

=== Country ===
- James Heading MLA (Marodian)

=== Liberal ===
- Peter Connolly MLA (Kurilpa)

=== Queensland Labor ===
- Arthur Jones MLA (Charters Towers)
- Bill Power MLA (Baroona)

== Candidates ==
Sitting members at the time of the election are shown in bold text.

Electorate	Held by	Labor candidate	Coalition candidate	QLP candidate	Other candidates
Albert	Country	**Cecil Jesson**	Cec Carey (CP)		Ernest Harley (Ind); Grace Plunkett (Ind CP)
Ashgrove	Liberal	Bert Turner	**Douglas Tooth** (Lib)	Thomas Heike	
Aspley	Liberal	Nellie Carver	Fred Campbell (Lib)	George Kerr	
Aubigny	Country	Bruce Strachan	**Jim Sparkes** (CP)	**Les Diplock**	
Balonne	Country	William Dendle	**Eddie Beardmore** (CP)		
Barambah	Country	Bill Weir	**Joh Bjelke-Petersen** (CP)	Daniel Curtain	
Barcoo	Labor	**Ned Davis**	Fred Gowland (CP)	**Tom Foley**	
Baroona	QLP	**Pat Hanlon**	Roger Moore (Lib)	Geoffrey Maule	
Belmont	Labor	Fred Newton	Bill Hewitt (Lib)	Jean Reville	
Bowen	Liberal	William Klaka	Peter Delamothe (Lib)	James Berryman	James Nisbet (CPA)
Brisbane	Labor	**Johnno Mann**	Jim Rowan (Lib)	Lionel Orreal	
Bulimba	Labor	**Jack Houston**	Ronald Kelk (Lib)	Bob Gardner	
Bundaberg	QLP	John Salter	Robert Howard (Lib)	**Ted Walsh**	
Burdekin	Independent	Fred Page		**Colin McCathie**	**Arthur Coburn** (Ind)
Burke	QLP	Alec Inch	Alexander Hindson (CP)	**Norm Smith**	
Burnett	Country	Denis Grace	Claude Wharton (CP)	Edward McDonnell	
Cairns	Labor	**Watty Wallace**	Albert Baggott (CP)	William Allendorf	
Callide	Country	Oliver Edwards	**Vince Jones** (CP)		
Carnarvon	QLP	Douglas Gow	Fred Rogers (CP)	**Paul Hilton**	
Chatsworth	Liberal	Joseph Ferguson	**Thomas Hiley** (Lib)	Terry Burns	
Clayfield	Liberal	Edgar Abel	**Harold Taylor** (Lib)	Harry Wright	
Condamine	QLP	Leslie Beaumont	Vic Sullivan (CP)		James Drabsch (Ind)
Cook	QLP	Jack Bethel	William Simms (CP)	**Bunny Adair**	
Cooroora	Country	Lancelot Sanderson	**David Low** (CP)		
Cunningham	Country		**Alan Fletcher** (CP)		
Fassifern	Country	Denis O'Brien	**Alf Muller** (CP)		
Flinders	Country	Frank Forde	**Bill Longeran** (CP)	Patrick McLaughlin	
Greenslopes	Liberal	John Hughes	**Keith Hooper** (Lib)	Michael Lyons	Eric Allen (SC)
Gregory	Country	Martin Laracy	**Wally Rae** (CP)		
Gympie	Country	Blair Jamieson	**Max Hodges** (CP)	Denis Tanner	
Hawthorne	Labor	**Bill Baxter**	Clive Harburg (Lib)	Greg Kehoe	
Hinchinbrook	Labor	Kevin Cavanagh	John Row (CP)	Victor Bodero	William Wilson (Ind)
Ipswich East	Labor	**Jim Donald**	Hedley Scriven (Lib)	Charles Archer	
Ipswich West	Labor	**Ivor Marsden**	Harry Groth (Lib)	Selby Guymer	Thomas Millar (CPA)
Isis	Country		**Jack Pizzey** (CP)		
Ithaca	Labor	Manfred Cross	**Bob Windsor** (Lib)	John O'Connell	
Kedron	Labor	**Eric Lloyd**	Ronald Burrows (Lib)		Harold Whitlock (Ind)
Kurilpa	Liberal	Arthur Larkin	Clive Hughes (Lib)	Paul Tucker	
Landsborough	Country	Frank McLoughlin	**Frank Nicklin** (CP)		
Lockyer	Liberal		**Gordon Chalk** (Lib)		James Dwyer (Ind); John Martin (Ind CP); Edwin Olm (Ind Lab)
Logan	Country	Vincent Sheppard	**Leslie Harrison** (CP)		
Mackay	Labor	**Fred Graham**	John Matson (CP)	Terence Hayes	
Mackenzie	Country	Charles White	**Nev Hewitt** (CP)		
Maryborough	Labor	**Horace Davies**	Ronald Christensen (CP)		
Merthyr	Liberal	Tom Campbell	**Sam Ramsden** (Lib)	Mick O'Connor	
Mirani	Country	George Moody	**Ernie Evans** (CP)	Waller O'Grady	
Mount Coot-tha	Liberal	James Davis	**Kenneth Morris** (Lib)	Bryan Hurley	
Mount Gravatt	Liberal	Fred Pearson	**Graham Hart** (Lib)	Rupert Kneen	Eric King (Ind)
Mourilyan	Labor	**Peter Byrne**	Edmund Webb (CP)	Geoff Higham	
Mulgrave	Country	Stanley Scoines	Roy Armstrong (CP)	Charles English	James Hesp (Ind)
Murrumba	Country	Norm Kruger	**David Nicholson** (CP)		
Norman	Labor	Fred Bromley	Cyril Ryan (Lib)	George Hartnett	Edmund Crisp (CPA)
Nudgee	Labor	Jack Melloy	William Banks (Lib)	Walter Barnes	William Hill (CPA)
Nundah	Liberal	Michael Sweeney	**William Knox** (Lib)	Jim Hadley	
Port Curtis	Labor	**Jim Burrows**			Desmond Neill-Ballantine (Ind)
Redcliffe	Country	Kenneth Griffith	Seymour Gomersall (CP)	Edward Dignan	Alexander Black (Ind); Jim Houghton* (Ind)
Rockhampton North	Labor	**Merv Thackeray**	Hector MacDonald (Lib)	James Verney	
Rockhampton South	QLP	**Jim Clark**	Rex Pilbeam (Lib)	**Mick Gardner**	
Roma	Country	John Taylor	**William Ewan** (CP)		Richard Condon (Ind)
Salisbury	Labor	Doug Sherrington	Norman Edwards (Lib)	William Tresillian	Walter Stubbins (CPA)
Sandgate	Liberal	Harry Dean	**Thomas Ahearn** (Lib)	Hindrick Lokhorst	
Sherwood	Liberal	Gordon Thomson	**John Herbert** (Lib)		
Somerset	Country	Robert Warren	**Harold Richter** (CP)	Alexander Skinner	
South Brisbane	QLP	Col Bennett	Charles O'Brien (Lib)	**Vince Gair**	
South Coast	Country	William Darveniza	**Eric Gaven** (CP)		John Fitzgerald (Ind)
Tablelands	Country	Edwin Wallis-Smith	**Tom Gilmore** (CP)	Arthur Mottarelly	
Toowong	Liberal		**Alan Munro** (Lib)	Roger Judge	
Toowoomba East	Liberal	Peter Wood	**Mervyn Anderson** (Lib)	Leonard Green	
Toowoomba West	Labor	**Jack Duggan**	Lawrence Storey (Lib)	Kenneth Rawle	
Townsville North	Labor	Perc Tucker	Roy Annable (Lib)	Ronald Comerford	Frank Bishop (CPA); Archibald Hooper (Ind)
Townsville South	NQ Labor	Bill Edmonds			**Tom Aikens** (NQLP)
Warrego	Labor	**John Dufficy**		John Glynn	
Warwick	Country	Reggie Wenham	**Otto Madsen** (CP)	George Campbell	
Wavell	Liberal	Benjamin Harriss	**Alex Dewar** (Lib)	Kevin O'Dea	
Whitsunday	Country	Stanley Dalton	**Lloyd Roberts** (CP)	Bernard Lewis	
Windsor	Liberal	George Georgouras	**Ray Smith** (Lib)	Percy Hotham	
Wynnum	Labor	**Bill Gunn**	George Dodd (Lib)	George Campbell	
Yeronga	Liberal	John O'Donnell	**Winston Noble** (Lib)	Francis Wickings	

== See also ==
- 1960 Queensland state election
- Members of the Queensland Legislative Assembly, 1957–1960
- Members of the Queensland Legislative Assembly, 1960–1963
- List of political parties in Australia
