= Members of the Queensland Legislative Assembly, 1957–1960 =

This is a list of members of the 35th Legislative Assembly of Queensland from 1957 to 1960, as elected at the 1957 state election held on 3 August 1957.

| Name | Party | Electorate | Term in office |
|---|---|---|---|
| Bunny Adair | QLP | Cook | 1953–1969 |
| Thomas Ahearn | Liberal | Sandgate | 1957–1960 |
| Tom Aikens | NQLP | Mundingburra | 1944–1977 |
| Mervyn Anderson | Liberal | Toowoomba | 1957–1966 |
| Bill Baxter | Labor | Norman | 1953–1966 |
| Eddie Beardmore | Country | Balonne | 1957–1969 |
| Joh Bjelke-Petersen | Country | Barambah | 1947–1987 |
| Jim Burrows | Labor | Port Curtis | 1947–1963 |
| Peter Byrne | Labor | Mourilyan | 1950–1969 |
| Hon Gordon Chalk | Liberal | Lockyer | 1947–1976 |
| Jim Clark | Labor | Fitzroy | 1935–1960 |
| Arthur Coburn | Independent | Burdekin | 1950–1969 |
| Peter Connolly | Liberal | Kurilpa | 1957–1960 |
| Horace Davies | Labor | Maryborough | 1953–1971 |
| Ned Davis | Labor | Barcoo | 1943–1961 |
| Alex Dewar | Liberal | Chermside | 1950–1969 |
| Les Diplock | QLP | Condamine | 1953–1972 |
| Jim Donald | Labor | Bremer | 1946–1969 |
| John Dufficy | Labor | Warrego | 1951–1969 |
| Hon Jack Duggan ^{[3]} | Labor | North Toowoomba | 1935–1957, 1958–1969 |
| Hon Ernie Evans | Country | Mirani | 1947–1965 |
| William Ewan | Country | Roma | 1950–1953, 1957–1967 |
| Hon Alan Fletcher | Country | Cunningham | 1953–1974 |
| Hon Tom Foley | QLP | Belyando | 1919–1960 |
| Hon Vince Gair | QLP | South Brisbane | 1932–1960 |
| Mick Gardner | QLP | Rockhampton | 1956–1960 |
| Eric Gaven | Country | Southport | 1950–1966 |
| Tom Gilmore | Country | Tablelands | 1957–1963 |
| Fred Graham | Labor | Mackay | 1943–1969 |
| Bill Gunn | Labor | Wynnum | 1944–1966 |
| Pat Hanlon | Labor | Ithaca | 1956–1974 |
| Leslie Harrison | Country | Darlington | 1957–1966 |
| Graham Hart | Liberal | Mount Gravatt | 1957–1963 |
| Hon James Heading | Country | Marodian | 1947–1960 |
| John Herbert | Liberal | Sherwood | 1956–1978 |
| Nev Hewitt | Country | Mackenzie | 1956–1980 |
| Hon Thomas Hiley | Liberal | Coorparoo | 1944–1966 |
| Hon Paul Hilton | QLP | Carnarvon | 1935–1963 |
| Max Hodges | Country | Nash | 1957–1979 |
| Keith Hooper | Liberal | Buranda | 1957–1977 |
| Jack Houston | Labor | Bulimba | 1957–1980 |
| Cecil Jesson | Labor | Hinchinbrook | 1935–1960 |
| Hon Arthur Jones | QLP | Charters Towers | 1929–1932, 1939–1960 |
| Vince Jones | Country | Callide | 1950–1971 |
| George Keyatta | Labor | Townsville | 1939–1960 |
| William Knox | Liberal | Nundah | 1957–1989 |
| Eric Lloyd | Labor | Kedron | 1951–1972 |
| Bill Longeran ^{[2]} | Country | Flinders | 1957–1958, 1958–1974 |
| David Low | Country | Cooroora | 1947–1974 |
| Colin McCathie | QLP | Haughton | 1950–1960 |
| Hon Otto Madsen | Country | Warwick | 1947–1963 |
| Hon Johnno Mann | Labor | Brisbane | 1936–1969 |
| Ivor Marsden | Labor | Ipswich | 1949–1966 |
| Hon Kenneth Morris | Liberal | Mount Coot-tha | 1944–1963 |
| Hon Alf Muller | Country | Fassifern | 1935–1969 |
| Hon Alan Munro | Liberal | Toowong | 1950–1966 |
| David Nicholson | Country | Murrumba | 1950–1972 |
| Hon Frank Nicklin | Country | Landsborough | 1932–1968 |
| Hon Dr Winston Noble | Liberal | Yeronga | 1950–1964 |
| Hon Jack Pizzey | Country | Isis | 1950–1968 |
| Hon Bill Power | QLP | Baroona | 1935–1960 |
| Wally Rae^{[1]} | Country | Gregory | 1957–1974 |
| Sam Ramsden | Liberal | Merthyr | 1957–1971 |
| Harold Richter | Country | Somerset | 1957–1972 |
| Lloyd Roberts | Country | Whitsunday | 1950–1961 |
| Norm Smith | QLP | Carpentaria | 1941–1960 |
| Ray Smith | Liberal | Windsor | 1957–1969 |
| Jim Sparkes | Country | Aubigny | 1932–1935, 1941–1960 |
| Harold Taylor | Liberal | Clayfield | 1947–1963 |
| Merv Thackeray | Labor | Keppel | 1957–1972 |
| Douglas Tooth | Liberal | Kelvin Grove | 1957–1974 |
| Watty Wallace | Labor | Cairns | 1956–1964 |
| Hon Ted Walsh | QLP | Bundaberg | 1935–1947, 1950–1969 |
| Bob Watson^{[4]} | Country | Mulgrave | 1950–1953, 1957–1959 |
| Bob Windsor | Liberal | Fortitude Valley | 1957–1966 |
| Les Wood ^{[3]} | Labor | North Toowoomba | 1946–1947, 1950–1958 |
| Carlisle Wordsworth^{[4]}^{[5]} | Country | Mulgrave | 1950–1953, 1959–1960 |

^{1} On 13 July 1957, three weeks before the 1957 state election, George Devries, the Labor member for Gregory, died. The election was therefore postponed in Gregory until 5 October 1957, when the Country candidate Wally Rae was elected.
^{2} At the 1957 state election, the seat of Flinders was decided in favour of Country candidate Bill Longeran over Labor incumbent Frank Forde by one vote. The resulting Elections Tribunal, which was conducted by Mr Justice Philp and heard evidence on 17 February 1958, found on 4 March 1958 that one of the presiding officers had "so improperly conducted a poll that the election was void". Longeran won the resulting by-election on 17 May 1958 by 1,948 votes to Forde's 1,534.
^{3} On 29 March 1958, the Labor member for North Toowoomba and Opposition Leader, Les Wood, died. Labor candidate and former Deputy Premier Jack Duggan won the resulting by-election on 31 May 1958, and subsequently became leader of the Labor Party.
^{4} On 26 March 1959, the Country member for Mulgrave, Bob Watson, died. Country candidate Carlisle Wordsworth won the resulting by-election on 6 June 1959.
^{5} On 7 May 1960, three weeks before the 1960 state election, Carlisle Wordsworth, the Country member for Mulgrave, died. The election was therefore postponed in Mulgrave.

== See also ==
- 1957 Queensland state election
- Nicklin Ministry (Country Party) (1957–1968)
