= Members of the Queensland Legislative Assembly, 1953–1956 =

This is a list of members of the 33rd Legislative Assembly of Queensland from 1953 to 1956, as elected at the 1953 state election held on 7 March 1953.

Name	Party	Electorate	Term in office
Bunny Adair	Labor	Cook	1953–1969
Tom Aikens	NQLP	Mundingburra	1944–1977
Bill Baxter	Labor	Norman	1953–1966
Joh Bjelke-Petersen	Country	Barambah	1947–1987
Mick Brosnan	Labor	Fortitude Valley	1950–1957
Dick Brown	Labor	Buranda	1947–1957
Jim Burrows	Labor	Port Curtis	1947–1963
Peter Byrne	Labor	Mourilyan	1950–1969
Gordon Chalk	Liberal	Lockyer	1947–1976
Jim Clark	Labor	Fitzroy	1935–1960
Arthur Coburn	Independent	Burdekin	1950–1969
Hon Harold Collins	Labor	Tablelands	1935–1957
Viv Cooper	Labor	Keppel	1952–1957
Thomas Crowley	Labor	Cairns	1947–1956
Horace Davies^{[1]}	Labor	Maryborough	1953–1971
Ned Davis	Labor	Barcoo	1943–1961
Hon George Devries	Labor	Gregory	1941–1957
Alex Dewar	Liberal	Chermside	1950–1969
Les Diplock	Labor	Condamine	1953–1972
Felix Dittmer	Labor	Mount Gravatt	1950–1957
Alfred Dohring	Labor	Roma	1953–1957
Jim Donald	Labor	Bremer	1946–1969
John Dufficy	Labor	Warrego	1951–1969
Hon Jack Duggan	Labor	Toowoomba	1935–1957, 1958–1969
Leonard Eastment	Labor	Ithaca	1952–1956
Charles English	Labor	Mulgrave	1953–1957
Ernie Evans	Country	Mirani	1947–1965
David Farrell^{[1]}	Labor	Maryborough	1938–1953
Alan Fletcher	Country	Cunningham	1953–1974
Hon Tom Foley	Labor	Belyando	1919–1960
Hon Frank Forde^{[2]}	Labor	Flinders	1917–1922, 1955–1957
Hon Vince Gair	Labor	South Brisbane	1932–1960
Bob Gardner	Labor	Bulimba	1950–1957
Eric Gaven	Country	Southport	1950–1966
Fred Graham	Labor	Mackay	1943–1969
Bill Gunn	Labor	Wynnum	1944–1966
James Heading	Country	Marodian	1947–1960
Thomas Hiley	Liberal	Coorparoo	1944–1966
Hon Paul Hilton	Labor	Carnarvon	1935–1963
Cecil Jesson	Labor	Hinchinbrook	1935–1960
Hon Arthur Jones	Labor	Charters Towers	1929–1932, 1939–1960
Vince Jones	Country	Callide	1950–1971
Greg Kehoe	Labor	Nash	1953–1957
Tom Kerr	Liberal	Sherwood	1943–1956
George Keyatta	Labor	Townsville	1939–1960
Hon James Larcombe	Labor	Rockhampton	1912–1929, 1932–1956
Eric Lloyd	Labor	Kedron	1951–1972
David Low	Country	Cooroora	1947–1974
Hon Colin McCathie	Labor	Haughton	1950–1960
Otto Madsen	Country	Warwick	1947–1963
Hon Johnno Mann	Labor	Brisbane	1936–1969
Ivor Marsden	Labor	Ipswich	1949–1966
Hon Bill Moore	Labor	Merthyr	1940–1957
Tom Moores	Labor	Kurilpa	1949–1957
Sir Kenneth Morris	Liberal	Mount Coot-tha	1944–1963
Alf Muller	Country	Fassifern	1935–1969
Alan Munro	Liberal	Toowong	1950–1966
David Nicholson	Country	Murrumba	1950–1972
Frank Nicklin	Country	Landsborough	1932–1968
Dr Winston Noble	Liberal	Yeronga	1950–1964
Jack Pizzey	Country	Isis	1950–1968
Tom Plunkett	Country	Darlington	1929–1957
Hon Bill Power	Labor	Baroona	1935–1960
Tom Rasey	Labor	Windsor	1950–1957
Hon Ernest Riordan^{[2]}	Labor	Flinders	1936–1944, 1950–1954
Frank Roberts	Labor	Nundah	1947–1956
Lloyd Roberts	Country	Whitsunday	1950–1961
Herbert Robinson	Labor	Sandgate	1953–1957
Alexander Skinner	Labor	Somerset	1953–1957
Norm Smith	Labor	Carpentaria	1941–1960
Jim Sparkes	Country	Aubigny	1932–1935, 1941–1960
Harold Taylor	Liberal	Clayfield	1947–1963
John Taylor	Labor	Balonne	1944–1957
Bert Turner	Labor	Kelvin Grove	1941–1957
Hon Ted Walsh	Labor	Bundaberg	1935–1947, 1950–1969
Paddy Whyte	Labor	Mackenzie	1950–1956
Les Wood	Labor	North Toowoomba	1946–1947, 1950–1958

^{1} On 17 August 1953, the Labor member for Maryborough, David Farrell, died. Labor candidate Horace Davies won the resulting by-election on 28 November 1953.
^{2} On 9 December 1954, the Labor member for Flinders and the Secretary for Mines and Immigration, Ernest Riordan, died. Labor candidate and former Prime Minister Frank Forde won the resulting by-election on 12 March 1955.

== See also ==
- 1953 Queensland state election
- Gair Ministry (Labor) (1952–1957)
