= 1957 Queensland state election =

- 3 August 1957

All 75 seats in the Legislative Assembly of Queensland 38 Assembly seats were needed for a majority
- Registered: 747,455 ▲4.9%
- Turnout: 706,909 (94.58%) (▲1.69 pp)
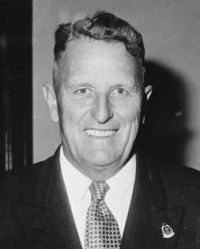

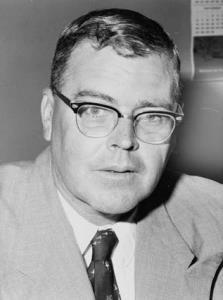

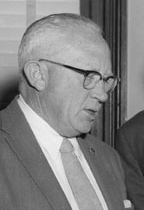

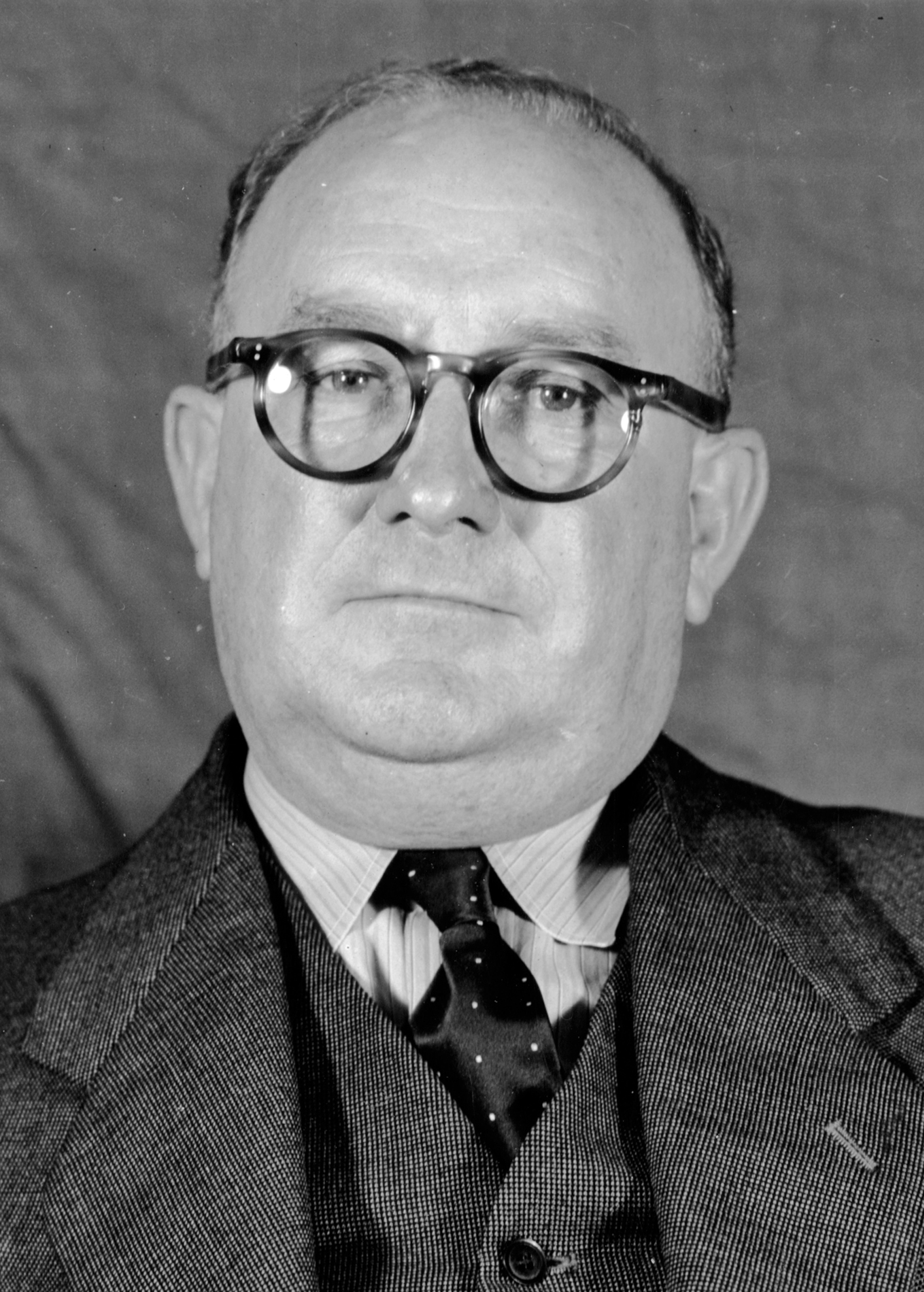
	First party	Second party
Leader	Frank Nicklin	Jack Duggan
Party	Country	Labor
Leader since	21 May 1941	24 April 1957
Leader's seat	Landsborough	Toowoomba (lost seat)
Last election	16 seats	49 seats
Seats won	24	20
Seat change	▲8	▼29
Popular vote	139,720	201,971
Percentage	19.99%	28.90%
Swing	▲0.72 pp	▼5.98 pp
	Third party	Fourth party
Leader	Kenneth Morris	Vince Gair
Party	Liberal	Queensland Labor
Leader since	17 August 1954	26 April 1957
Leader's seat	Mount Coot-tha	South Brisbane
Last election	8 seats	Did not exist
Seats won	18 seats	11
Seat change	▲10	▲11
Popular vote	162,372	163,534
Percentage	23.23%	23.40%
Swing	▼7.34 pp	▲23.40 pp
- Legislative Assembly after the election
Premier before election
Vince Gair
Queensland Labor Party
Subsequent Premier
Frank Nicklin
Country

Elections were held in the Australian state of Queensland on 3 August 1957 to elect the 75 members of the state's Legislative Assembly. The major parties contesting the election were the Queensland Labor Party led by Premier Vince Gair, the Labor Party led by former Deputy Premier Jack Duggan, and the Country-Liberal coalition led by Frank Nicklin.

The elections, only 15 months into the parliamentary term, were made necessary by the collapse of the nine-term Labor government. Gair had formed the Queensland Labor Party after being expelled from the Labor Party, and attempted to stay in power as a minority government. However, a request for supply was denied on 12 June, forcing the election. The Country-Liberal Coalition won a decisive victory, taking 42 seats against only 31 for the two Labor factions combined.

== Key dates ==
Date	Event
24 April 1957	Vince Gair was expelled from the Labor Party.
26 April 1957	The Queensland Labor Party was formed, and Parliament was prorogued to 11 June.
11 June 1957	Parliament resumed for business at noon.
13 June 1957	The Parliament was dissolved.
2 July 1957	Writs were issued by the Administrator to proceed with an election.
12 July 1957	Close of nominations.
3 August 1957	Polling day, between the hours of 8am and 6pm.
12 August 1957	The Gair Ministry resigned and the Nicklin Ministry was sworn in.
24 August 1957	The writ was returned and the results formally declared.
27 August 1957	Parliament resumed for business.

== Background ==
On 18 April 1957, the Queensland Central Executive of the Labor Party passed a vote of no confidence in Premier Gair, and on 24 April, despite having gained a unanimous vote of support from the Cabinet, he was expelled from the Labor Party. On 26 April, Gair and 25 MLAs met and formed the Queensland Labor Party (QLP) with those present, with Gair as leader. Those at the meeting included all of the Cabinet except Deputy Premier Jack Duggan and two ex-Labor Independents. All these were also expelled from the party. Duggan resigned from the ministry on 29 April and succeeded Gair as leader of the Labor Party, which commanded the support of 22 MLAs.

Gair almost immediately began talks with Nicklin for confidence and supply support in the legislature. However, Nicklin broke them off on the advice of federal Country Party leader Arthur Fadden (himself a Queenslander), who believed the ructions in Labor gave Nicklin a chance to become Premier himself, ending 22 years in opposition. On 12 June 1957, Lieutenant Governor and Chief Justice of Queensland Alan Mansfield (Governor John Lavarack was indisposed) ordered Parliament to reassemble. Shortly after 10:30 pm that night, Treasurer Ted Walsh moved that supply be granted to the Gair QLP government. The motion was defeated after the ALP and Coalition rose to vote against it, bringing the Gair government down. Gair immediately asked for new elections, which were called for 3 August.

== Campaign ==
On 1 July, Frank Nicklin delivered the Country Party's policy speech at Maroochydore, while Kenneth Morris delivered the Liberal Party's policy speech in Brisbane. The two coalition partners declared to the electorate that only they could deliver unity and effective government, an acceleration of development and civil rights, as well as court supervision of union ballots to limit strike action.

On 4 July, Jack Duggan, the Labor leader, announced Labor's campaign slogan, "A fair go for all", and promised three weeks' annual leave (the issue over which Premier Vince Gair and the party executive had split) would be implemented if his party was elected. On 8 July, Gair, the incumbent Premier representing the Queensland Labor Party (QLP), spent half his speech talking about the dispute that had led to the split, promised an attack upon Communism and a continuance of the previous government's development platform.

Nominations closed on 12 July, with a record total of 219 candidates. Four seats were uncontested, but many seats had both Labor and QLP contestants. Some contests became particularly bitter as the Labor Party accused their QLP opponents of sectarianism and alleged direct interference by ministers of the Catholic Church, despite Archbishop James Duhig's refusal to get involved. The campaigns were strongest in the leaders' and deputy leaders' own seats.

Politicians from around Australia, in particular from the Labor Party, came to Queensland during the campaign, including the federal opposition leader, Dr H. V. Evatt, Arthur Calwell, Clyde Cameron and former Victorian premier John Cain, who died of a stroke on 9 August after giving a speech in Townsville.

== Results ==
When the writs were dropped, the Labor forces were in a precarious position. Every ALP MP faced a QLP challenger, and every QLP MP faced an ALP challenger. This created dozens of three-cornered contests, and the first-past-the-post system left them without the option of directing preferences to each other even if they wanted to do so.

The Coalition actually suffered a swing of 1.2 percent against it. However, the ructions in Labor allowed the Coalition to win a number of three-cornered contests, assuring a comfortable majority for Nicklin, with 42 seats against only 31 for the two Labor factions combined. The ALP lost both Duggan and deputy leader Felix Dittmer, whose seats were won by Liberal candidates. The QLP lost 14 seats (two of them to the ALP), but seven of the ten ministers retained their seats. This began what would be 32 years of non-Labor government in Queensland.

Queensland state election, 3 August 1957 Legislative Assembly << 1956–1960 >>
Enrolled voters	747,455^{[1]}				
Votes cast	706,909		Turnout	94.58	+1.57
Informal votes	8,033		Informal	1.14	–0.07
Summary of votes by party
Party	Primary votes	%	Swing	Seats	Change
Labor	201,971	28.90	–22.32	20	–29
Queensland Labor	163,534	23.40	+23.40	11	+11
Liberal	162,372	23.23	–1.84	18	+10
Country	139,720	19.99	+0.72	24	+8
NQ Labor	7,488	1.07	–0.25	1	±0
Ind. Labor	2,257	0.32	+0.26	0	±0
Ind. Conservative	2,723	0.39	+0.39	0	±0
Independent	18,811	2.69	–0.17	1	±0
Total	698,876			75	

Popular vote
Labor	28.90%
Queensland Labor	23.40%
Liberal	23.23%
Country	19.99%
NQ Labor	1.07%
Independents	3.40%

Seats
Country	32.00%
Labor	26.67%
Liberal	24.00%
Queensland Labor	14.67%
NQ Labor	1.33%
Independents	1.33%

^{1} 791,719 electors were enrolled to vote at the election, but three Country seats representing 30,956 enrolled voters and one Liberal seat representing 13,308 voters were unopposed.

== Seats changing party representation ==
This table lists changes in party representation at the 1957 election.

=== Party changes before election ===
The following seats changed party representation before the election due to the split of the ALP.

Seat	Incumbent member	Former party	New party
Baroona	Bill Power	Australian Labor	Queensland Labor
Belyando	Tom Foley	Australian Labor	Queensland Labor
Bulimba	Bob Gardner	Australian Labor	Queensland Labor
Bundaberg	Ted Walsh	Australian Labor	Queensland Labor
Carnarvon	Paul Hilton	Australian Labor	Queensland Labor
Carpentaria	Norm Smith	Australian Labor	Queensland Labor
Charters Towers	Arthur Jones	Australian Labor	Queensland Labor
Condamine	Les Diplock	Australian Labor	Queensland Labor
Cook	Bunny Adair	Australian Labor	Queensland Labor
Fortitude Valley	Mick Brosnan	Australian Labor	Queensland Labor
Gregory	George Devries	Australian Labor	Queensland Labor
Haughton	Colin McCathie	Australian Labor	Queensland Labor
Keppel	Viv Cooper	Australian Labor	Queensland Labor
Kurilpa	Tom Moores	Australian Labor	Queensland Labor
Merthyr	Bill Moore	Australian Labor	Queensland Labor
Mulgrave	Charles English	Australian Labor	Queensland Labor
Nash	Greg Kehoe	Australian Labor	Queensland Labor
Nundah	Jim Hadley	Australian Labor	Queensland Labor
Rockhampton	Mick Gardner	Australian Labor	Queensland Labor
Roma	Alfred Dohring	Australian Labor	Queensland Labor
Sandgate	Herbert Robinson	Australian Labor	Queensland Labor
Somerset	Alexander Skinner	Australian Labor	Queensland Labor
South Brisbane	Vince Gair	Australian Labor	Queensland Labor
Tablelands	Harold Collins	Australian Labor	Queensland Labor
Windsor	Tom Rasey	Australian Labor	Queensland Labor

=== Seats changing hands at election ===
Seat	Incumbent member	Party	New member	Party
Balonne	John Taylor	Labor	Eddie Beardmore	Country
Bulimba	Bob Gardner	Queensland Labor	Jack Houston	Labor
Buranda	Dick Brown	Labor	Keith Hooper	Liberal
Flinders	Frank Forde	Labor	Bill Lonergan	Country
Fortitude Valley	Mick Brosnan	Queensland Labor	Bob Windsor	Liberal
Gregory*	George Devries	Queensland Labor	Wally Rae	Country
Kelvin Grove	Bert Turner	Labor	Douglas Tooth	Liberal
Keppel	Viv Cooper	Queensland Labor	Merv Thackeray	Labor
Kurilpa	Tom Moores	Queensland Labor	Peter Connolly	Liberal
Merthyr	Bill Moore	Queensland Labor	Sam Ramsden	Liberal
Mount Gravatt	Felix Dittmer	Labor	Graham Hart	Liberal
Mulgrave	Charles English	Queensland Labor	Bob Watson	Country
Nash	Greg Kehoe	Queensland Labor	Max Hodges	Country
Nundah	Jim Hadley	Queensland Labor	William Knox	Liberal
Roma	Alfred Dohring	Queensland Labor	William Ewan	Country
Sandgate	Herbert Robinson	Queensland Labor	Thomas Ahearn	Liberal
Somerset	Alexander Skinner	Queensland Labor	Harold Richter	Country
Tablelands	Harold Collins	Queensland Labor	Tom Gilmore	Country
Toowoomba	Jack Duggan	Labor	Mervyn Anderson	Liberal
Windsor	Tom Rasey	Queensland Labor	Ray Smith	Libera==

- Members in **italics** did not recontest their seats.
- All sitting members of the Queensland Labor Party were elected at the previous election as ALP candidates.
- Sitting member for Gregory, George Devries died before election day. As a result, a supplementary election was held on 5 October for the seat.

== Aftermath ==
The Country Party's win in this election proved to be one of the major turning points in Queensland politics; they remained in power continuously until the 1989 state election.

The ALP elected Les Wood as party leader and Eric Lloyd as deputy leader; neither had previously served in a ministry. Wood, the member for North Toowoomba, died in office on 29 March 1958, and Duggan returned as both a member of Parliament and leader of the party at the by-election on 31 May. Dittmer, meanwhile, was elected to the Australian Senate.

Former Prime Minister Frank Forde, who lost his seat of Flinders by one vote, alleged the wrongful disallowance of some votes and successfully lodged a petition against his opponent's return at the Court of Disputed Returns; however he lost the resulting by-election.

== See also ==
- Members of the Queensland Legislative Assembly, 1956–1957
- Members of the Queensland Legislative Assembly, 1957–1960
- Candidates of the Queensland state election, 1957
- Gair Ministry
- Nicklin Ministry
