= Electoral results for the district of Haughton =

Queensland state electoral result

This is a list of electoral results for the electoral district of Haughton in Queensland state elections.

== Members for Haughton ==
Member	Party	Term
Colin McCathie	Labor	1950–1957
Colin McCathie	Queensland Labor	1957–1960

== Election results ==
=== Elections in the 1950s ===
1957 Queensland state election: Haughton
Party	Candidate	Votes	%	±%
Queensland Labor	Colin McCathie	4,164	48.1	+48.1
Labor	Vivien Owens	2,393	27.6	−42.8
Country	William Clayton	2,105	24.3	+24.3
Total formal votes		8,662	99.3	+0.4
Informal votes		64	0.7	−0.4
Turnout		8,726	95.2	+0.5
Queensland Labor gain from Labor		Swing	N/A	

1956 Queensland state election: Haughton
Party	Candidate	Votes	%	±%
Labor	Colin McCathie	5,737	70.4	+11.2
Liberal	Edwin Pearse	2,415	29.6	+29.6
Total formal votes		8,152	98.9	−0.5
Informal votes		88	1.1	+0.5
Turnout		8,240	94.7	−1.6
Labor hold		Swing	+1.4	

1953 Queensland state election: Haughton
Party	Candidate	Votes	%	±%
Labor	Colin McCathie	4,617	59.2	+12.3
Country	Frederick Purdie	1,661	21.3	+21.3
NQ Labor	Ernest O'Brien	1,526	19.6	0.0
Total formal votes		7,804	99.4	+1.4
Informal votes		46	0.6	−1.4
Turnout		7,850	96.3	+3.3
Labor hold		Swing	+13.7	

1950 Queensland state election: Haughton
Party	Candidate	Votes	%	±%
Labor	Colin McCathie	3,492	46.9	
Liberal	Bill Longeran	2,349	31.5	
NQ Labor	Ernest O'Brien	1,463	19.6	
Communist	Gwendoline Phelan	143	1.9	
Total formal votes		7,447	98.0	
Informal votes		151	2.0	
Turnout		7,598	93.0	
Labor hold		Swing		
