= 1960 Queensland state election =

← 1957	28 May 1960	1963 →

All 78 seats in the Legislative Assembly of Queensland 40 Assembly seats were needed for a majority
- Registered: 813,584 ▲8.9%
- Turnout: 752,927 (92.54%) (▼2.04 pp)
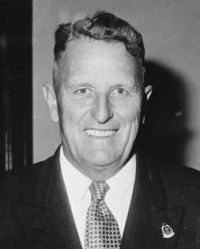

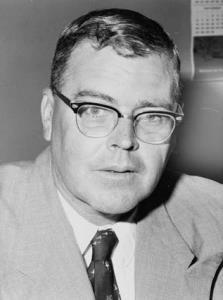

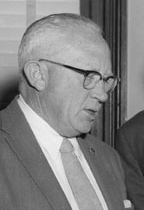

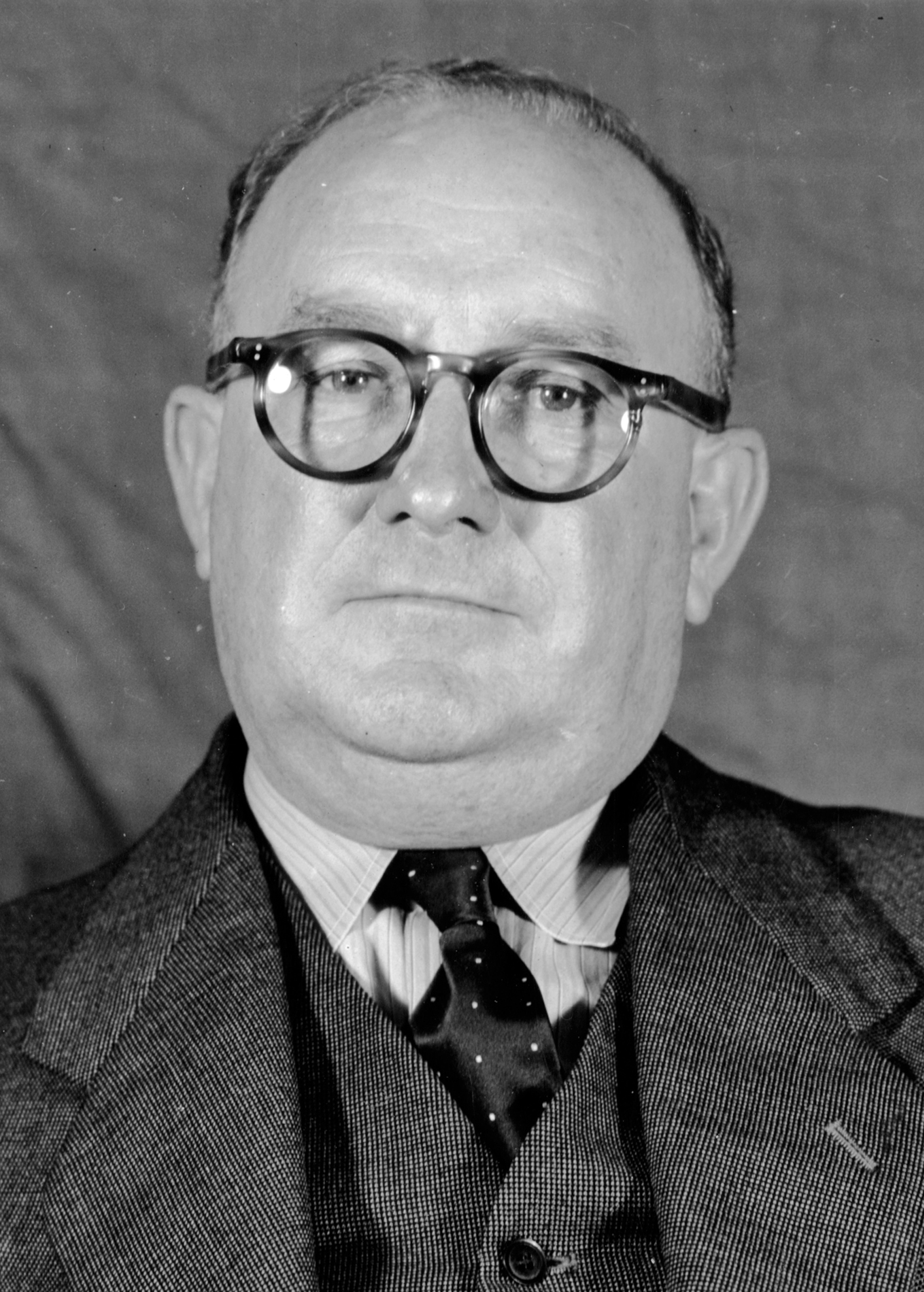
	First party	Second party
Leader	Frank Nicklin	Jack Duggan
Party	Country	Labor
Leader since	21 May 1941	18 August 1958
Leader's seat	Landsborough	Toowoomba West
Last election	24 seats	20 seats
Seats before	23 (Note: Carlisle Wordsworth of Mulgrave died on 7 May 1960, reducing the number of Country MPs by one before the state election three weeks in advance.)	20 seats
Seats won	26	25 seats
Seat change	▲3	▲5
Popular vote	139,720	296,430
Percentage	19.50%	39.89%
Swing	▼0.49 pp	▲10.99 pp
	Third party	Fourth party
Leader	Kenneth Morris	Vince Gair
Party	Liberal	Queensland Labor
Leader since	17 August 1954	26 April 1957
Leader's seat	Mount Coot-tha	South Brisbane (lost seat)
Last election	18 seats	11 seats
Seats before	18	11
Seats won	20	4
Seat change	▲2	▼7
Popular vote	178,567	91,212
Percentage	24.03%	12.28%
Swing	▲0.8 pp	▼11.12 pp
- Winning margin by electorate.
Premier before election
Frank Nicklin
Country
Elected Premier
Frank Nicklin
Country

Elections were held in the Australian state of Queensland on 28 May 1960 to elect the 78 members of the state's Legislative Assembly. The election followed the enactment of the Electoral Districts Act 1958, which increased the Assembly from 75 to 78 seats and modified the zonal system first established by Labor ahead of the 1950 election.

The major parties contesting the election were the Country Party led by Premier Frank Nicklin, the Liberal Party led by Kenneth Morris, the Labor Party led by Jack Duggan and the Queensland Labor Party led by Vince Gair. The Country and Liberal parties had formed a coalition.

The Country–Liberal coalition won a second term in office at the election, although the Labor Party recovered five seats and 11% of its vote from the 1957 election. Still, it was the first time since 1912 that a non-Labor government had been re-elected in Queensland.

== Key dates ==
Date	Event
13 April 1960	The Parliament was dissolved.
19 April 1960	Writs were issued by the governor to proceed with an election.
26 April 1960	Close of nominations.
28 May 1960	Polling day, between the hours of 8am and 6pm.
9 June 1960	The Nicklin Ministry was reconstituted.
8 July 1960	The writ was returned and the results formally declared.
23 August 1960	Parliament resumed for business.

== Results ==
Queensland state election, 28 May 1960 Legislative Assembly << 1957–1963 >>
Enrolled voters	813,584^{[1]}				
Votes cast	752,927		Turnout	92.54	–2.04
Informal votes	9,897		Informal	1.31	+0.17
Summary of votes by party
Party	Primary votes	%	Swing	Seats	Change
Labor	296,430	39.89	+11.00	25	+5
Liberal	178,567	24.03	+0.80	20	+2
Country	144,865	19.50	–0.49	26	+2
Queensland Labor	91,212	12.28	–11.12	4	–7
Independent	30,897	4.16		3	+2
Other	1,059	0.14		0	±0
Total	743,030			78	

Popular vote
Labor	39.89%
Liberal	24.03%
Country	19.50%
Queensland Labor	12.28%
Independents	4.16%
Others	0.14%

Seats
Country	33.33%
Labor	32.05%
Liberal	25.64%
Queensland Labor	5.13%
Independents	3.85%

^{1} 831,398 electors were enrolled to vote at the election, but two Country seats representing 17,814 enrolled voters were unopposed.

== Seats changing party representation ==
There was an extensive redistribution across Queensland prior to this election, increasing the number of seats from 75 to 78. The seat changes were as follows.

=== Abolished seats ===
Seat	Incumbent member	Party
Belyando	Tom Foley	Queensland Labor
Bremer	Jim Donald	Labor
Buranda	Keith Hooper	Liberal
Carpentaria	Norm Smith	Queensland Labor
Charters Towers	Arthur Jones	Queensland Labor
Chermside	Alex Dewar	Liberal
Coorparoo	Thomas Hiley	Liberal
Fitzroy	Jim Clark	Labor
Fortitude Valley	Bob Windsor	Liberal
Haughton	Colin McCathie	Queensland Labor
Ipswich	Ivor Marsden	Labor
Kelvin Grove	Douglas Tooth	Liberal
Keppel	Merv Thackeray	Labor
Marodian	James Heading	Country
Mundingburra	Tom Aikens	NQ Labor
Nash	Max Hodges	Country
North Toowoomba	Jack Duggan	Labor
Rockhampton	Mick Gardner	Queensland Labor
Southport	Eric Gaven	Country
Toowoomba	Mervyn Anderson	Liberal
Townsville	George Keyatta	Labor

- Members listed in italics retired at this election.

=== New seats ===
Seat	Party	Elected member
Albert	Country	Cec Carey
Ashgrove	Liberal	Douglas Tooth
Aspley	Liberal	Fred Campbell
Belmont	Labor	Fred Newton
Bowen	Liberal	Peter Delamothe
Burke	Labor	Alec Inch
Burnett	Country	Claude Wharton
Chatsworth	Liberal	Thomas Hiley
Greenslopes	Liberal	Keith Hooper
Gympie	Country	Max Hodges
Hawthorne	Labor	Bill Baxter
Ipswich East	Labor	Jim Donald
Ipswich West	Labor	Ivor Marsden
Nudgee	Labor	Jack Melloy
Redcliffe	Independent	Jim Houghton
Rockhampton North	Labor	Merv Thackeray
Rockhampton South	Liberal	Rex Pilbeam
Salisbury	Labor	Doug Sherrington
South Coast	Country	Eric Gaven
Toowoomba East	Liberal	Mervyn Anderson
Toowoomba West	Labor	Jack Duggan
Townsville North	Labor	Perc Tucker
Townsville South	NQ Labor	Tom Aikens
Wavell	Liberal	Alex Dewar

=== Seats changing hands ===
Seat	Incumbent member	Party	New member	Party
Aubigny	Jim Sparkes	Country	Les Diplock	Queensland Labor
Baroona	Bill Power	Queensland Labor	Pat Hanlon	Labor
Condamine	Les Diplock	Queensland Labor	Vic Sullivan	Country
Hinchinbrook	Cecil Jesson	Labor	John Row	Country
Ithaca	Pat Hanlon	Labor	Bob Windsor	Liberal
Sandgate	Thomas Ahearn	Liberal	Harry Dean	Labor
South Brisbane	Vince Gair	Queensland Labor	Col Bennett	Labor

- Members listed in italics did not recontest their seats.

== See also ==
- Members of the Queensland Legislative Assembly, 1957–1960
- Members of the Queensland Legislative Assembly, 1960–1963
- Candidates of the Queensland state election, 1960
- Nicklin Ministry
