= Electoral results for the district of Mulgrave =

Electoral results for the district of Mulgrave may refer to:

- Electoral results for the district of Mulgrave (Queensland)
- Electoral results for the district of Mulgrave (Victoria)
