= Queensland Labor Party (1957) =

Former political party in Australia

- Abbreviation: QLP
- Leader: Vince Gair (1957–1960); Paul Hilton (1960–1963)
- Founder: Vince Gair
- Founded: April 26, 1957
- Dissolved: March 21, 1978
- Split from: Australian Labor Party (Queensland Branch)
- Merged into: Democratic Labor Party (1962, as state branch)
- Ideology: Anti-communism; Social conservatism Christian democracy
- Queensland Parliament: 28 / 75 (1957 split) 11 / 75 (1957 state election)
- Senate: 1 / 10 (1957–1959)

The Queensland Labor Party (QLP) was a political party of Queensland, Australia, formed in 1957 by a breakaway group of the then ruling Labor Party Government, following the expulsion of Premier Vince Gair. In 1962 the party became the Queensland section of the Democratic Labor Party (DLP). The party continued to hold seats in the Queensland state parliament until 1972, then suffered a collapse in its vote and wound itself up in 1978.

== History ==
In Queensland, Vince Gair became Labor leader and premier in 1952.

On 24 April 1957, the Central Executive of the ALP expelled Gair because of his support of the Industrial Groups within the ALP. A total of 25 Labor MLAs left the party with him, including all the Cabinet, except Deputy Premier Jack Duggan, and formed the Queensland Labor Party. Two ex-Labor Independents joined the QLP. The ALP was left with 23 members with Duggan as leader. The Country and Liberal Parties had a combined 24 seats.

Gair tried to gain Country Party support for his minority government, but talks with Frank Nicklin broke down when federal Country Party leader Arthur Fadden (himself a Queenslander) told Nicklin that he had a chance to become Premier himself. On 12 June, the ALP, then led by Duggan, voted to deny "supply" (the money needed to govern) to what was left of the Gair government. The Country–Liberal Coalition moved to block supply as well and brought the government down.

A state election was called for 3 August 1957. At that time, Queensland's unicameral parliament was elected by first-past-the-post rather than the generally prevailing preferential voting system. Since all sitting ALP and QLP members were opposed by a candidate from the other faction, the Labor vote was split in many seats. Although the Coalition suffered a small swing against it, the large number of three-cornered contests resulted in the ALP and QLP losing seats to the Coalition. The two Labor factions won only 31 seats between them, as opposed to the Coalition's 42 (up from 24 previously). The QLP won 23.4% of the vote, second behind Labor, and 11 of the 75 seats. Nicklin became Premier and, for the first time in 25 years, and only the second time since 1915, a Labor Government was out of office in Queensland. Gair himself was re-elected in South Brisbane.

At the 1960 state election, the QLP won only four seats, with even Gair losing his seat. In 1961, he stood for the Senate for the QLP, but was unsuccessful. Gair's QLP merged with the Democratic Labor Party (DLP) in 1962 to become the Queensland branch of the DLP. However, that decision split the state parliamentarians. Two of them, Bunny Adair and Ted Walsh, opposed joining the DLP and became independent members.

At the 1963 state election, preferential voting was reintroduced. That meant the DLP not only drew votes away from the ALP, but also directed their preferences to the Coalition. Gair became federal DLP leader in 1964, after his election to the Senate. From the 1963 election, the party's support in Queensland slipped below 8%, and the party retained only one seat in Queensland's unicameral parliament. The party's electoral support remained at about that level until the 1972 election when its last seat was lost in a redistribution.

The DLP lost its raison d'être after 1972 when Labor won office at the federal level. At the time, the state Country Party explored a merger with the DLP as part of a strategy of seeking greater unity with groups opposed to the federal Labor government, but the plan was soon abandoned. The DLP went into further decline in 1974 when Gair was forced to resign from the party as a result of the so-called Gair Affair. At the 1974 state election, the DLP did not contest all seats, and recorded only 1.91% of the vote. The DLP did not contest the 1977 state election and ceased to exist in 1978.

The ALP remained in opposition in Queensland even after the QLP and its successor, the DLP, had ceased to exist, eventually returning to government in 1989 with Wayne Goss as leader.

== Election results ==
Queensland Legislative Assembly
Election	Leader	Votes	%	Seats	+/–	Position	Status
1957	Vince Gair	163,534	23.40	11 / 75	▲11	▲4th	Crossbench
1960	Vince Gair	91,212	12.28	4 / 78	▼7	4th	Crossbench
1963	Paul Hilton	55,711	7.23	1 / 78	▼3	4th	Crossbench
1966	Paul Hilton	49,948	6.25	1 / 78	Steady	4th	Crossbench
1969	No state leader	61,661	7.24	1 / 78	Steady	4th	Crossbench
1972	No state leader	69,757	7.69	0 / 82	▼1	4th	No seats
1974	No state leader	55,771	1.91	0 / 82	Steady	▼5th	No seats

Australian House of Representatives
Election	Votes	%	Seats	+/–	Position	Status
1958	80,035	1.60	0 / 18	Steady	4th	No seats
1961	57,487	1.10	0 / 18	Steady	4th	No seats

== QLP parliamentarians ==
Federal

- Condon Byrne (Senate), 1957–58, 1968–74
- Vince Gair (Senate), 1965–74

Legislative Assembly of Queensland

- Bunny Adair (Cook), 1957–62 (left in opposition to joining the DLP)
- Mick Brosnan (Fortitude Valley), 1957
- Harold Collins (Tablelands), 1957
- Viv Cooper (Keppel), 1957
- George Devries (Gregory), 1957
- Les Diplock (Condamine, Aubigny), 1957–72
- Alfred Dohring (Roma), 1957
- Charles English (Mulgrave), 1957
- Tom Foley (Belyando), 1957–60
- Vince Gair (South Brisbane), 1957–60
- Mick Gardner (Rockhampton), 1957–60
- Bob Gardner (Bulimba), 1957
- Jim Hadley (Nundah), 1957
- Paul Hilton (Carnarvon), 1957–63
- Arthur Jones (Charters Towers), 1957–60
- Greg Kehoe (Nash), 1957
- Colin McCathie (Haughton), 1957–60
- Bill Moore (Merthyr), 1957
- Tom Moores (Kurilpa), 1957
- Bill Power (Baroona), 1957–60
- Tom Rasey (Windsor), 1957
- Herbert Robinson (Sandgate), 1957
- Alexander Skinner (Somerset), 1957
- Norm Smith (Carpentaria), 1957–60
- Ted Walsh (Bundaberg), 1957–62 (left in opposition to joining the DLP)
