= 1963 Queensland state election =

← 1960	1 June 1963	1966 →

All 78 seats in the Queensland Legislative Assembly 40 Assembly seats were needed for a majority
- Turnout: 94.29 (▲1.75 pp)
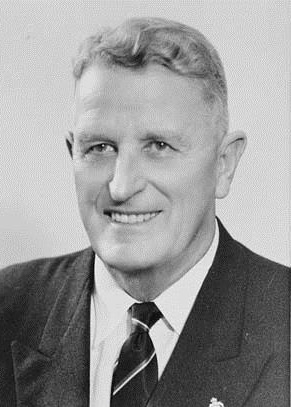

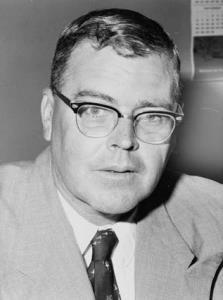

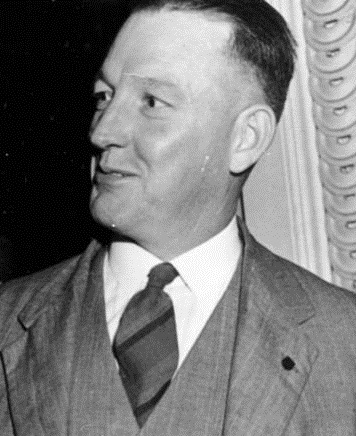
	First party	Second party	Third party
Leader	Frank Nicklin	Jack Duggan	Paul Hilton
Party	Country–Liberal Coalition	Labor	Queensland Labor
Leader since	21 May 1941	18 August 1958	28 May 1960
Leader's seat	Landsborough	Toowoomba West	Carnarvon (lost seat)
Last election	46 seats, 43.53%	25 seats, 39.89%	4 seats, 12.28%
Seats won	46	26	1
Seat change	Steady	▲1	▼3
Popular vote	339,806	337,928	55,711
Percentage	44.07%	43.83%	7.23%
Swing	▲0.54	▲3.94	▼5.05
- Winning margin by electorate.
Premier before election
Frank Nicklin
Country–Liberal Coalition
Elected Premier
Frank Nicklin
Country–Liberal Coalition

Elections were held in the Australian state of Queensland on 1 June 1963 to elect the 78 members of the state's Legislative Assembly.

The major parties contesting the election were the Country Party led by Premier Frank Nicklin, the Liberal Party led by Alan Munro, the Labor Party led by Jack Duggan and the Queensland Labor Party led by Paul Hilton. The Country and Liberal parties governed in coalition.

This election marked the return of preferential voting after first past the post voting had been used for elections from 1944 to 1960.

The Country–Liberal coalition won a third term in office at the election.

== Key dates ==
Date	Event
19 April 1963	The Parliament was dissolved.
19 April 1963	Writs were issued by the Administrator to proceed with an election.
26 April 1963	Close of nominations.
1 June 1963	Polling day, between the hours of 8am and 6pm.
5 July 1963	The writ was returned and the results formally declared.
20 August 1960	Parliament resumed for business.

== Results ==
Queensland state election, 1 June 1963 Legislative Assembly << 1960–1966 >>
Enrolled voters	830,436^{[1]}				
Votes cast	783,034		Turnout	94.29	+1.75
Informal votes	12,036		Informal	1.54	+0.23
Summary of votes by party
Party	Primary votes	%	Swing	Seats	Change
Labor	337,928	43.83	+3.94	26	+1
Liberal	183,185	23.76	–0.27	20	±0
Country	156,621	20.31	+0.81	26	±0
Queensland Labor	55,711	7.23	–5.05	1	–3
Independent (ex-QLP)	11,810	1.53	+1.53	2	+2
NQ Labor	8,229	1.07		1	±0
Ind. Conservative	3,028	0.39		1	+1
Independent	12,052	1.56	–2.60	1	–1
Total	770,998			78	

Popular vote
Labor	43.83%
Liberal	23.76%
Country	20.31%
Queensland Labor	7.23%
NQ Labor	1.07%
Independents	3.49%

Seats
Labor	33.33%
Country	33.33%
Liberal	25.64%
Queensland Labor	1.28%
NQ Labor	1.28%
Independents	5.13%

^{1} 839,323 electors were enrolled to vote at the election, but the Labor-held seat of Burke was not contested.

== Seats changing party representation ==
This table lists changes in party representation at the 1963 election.

Seat	Incumbent member	Party	New member	Party
Bundaberg	Ted Walsh	Democratic Labor	Ted Walsh	Independent
Carnarvon	Paul Hilton	Democratic Labor	Henry McKechnie	Country
Cook	Bunny Adair	Democratic Labor	Bunny Adair	Independent
Fassifern	Alf Muller	Country	Alf Muller	Independent
Redcliffe	Jim Houghton	Independent	Jim Houghton	Country
Tablelands	Tom Gilmore	Country	Edwin Wallis-Smith	Labor

== See also ==
- Members of the Queensland Legislative Assembly, 1960–1963
- Members of the Queensland Legislative Assembly, 1963–1966
- Candidates of the Queensland state election, 1963
- Nicklin Ministry
