= Charles English (politician) =

Australian politician (1902–1974)

Member of the Queensland Legislative Assembly for Mulgrave
- In office 7 March 1953 – 3 August 1957
- Preceded by: Robert Watson
- Succeeded by: Robert Watson

Personal details
- Born: Charles Bernard English; 30 January 1902 Goonengerry, New South Wales, Australia
- Died: 5 August 1974 (aged 72) Brisbane, Queensland, Australia
- Resting place: Pinnaroo Lawn Cemetery
- Party: Queensland Labor Party
- Other political affiliations: Labor
- Spouse: Mona Annie Evelyn McConnell (m.1926)
- Occupation: Timber mill owner, Farmer

Charles Bernard English (1902–1974) was a politician in Queensland, Australia. He was a Member of the Queensland Legislative Assembly.

== Early life ==
Charles English was born 30 January 1902 as Goonengerry near Lismore, New South Wales, the son of James English and his wife Catherine Jane (née Buckley). The family moved to the Atherton Tableland in 1904, and he was educated at Malanda, Queensland and at Mount Carmel College, Charters Towers, Queensland. He married Mona Annie Evelyn McConnell on 2 June 1926; the couple had 4 daughters. He was a sawmill owner and tobacco farmer.

== Politics ==
English won the seat of Mulgrave in the 1953 election as the Labor Party candidate, entering the Queensland Legislative Assembly. He held the seat in the 1956 election. On 26 April 1957, he followed Queensland Premier Vince Gair when he broke away from the ALP and formed the Queensland Labor Party (QLP). However, he was defeated at the 1957 election by Robert Watson, the Country Party candidate.

English contested Mulgrave again in the 1960 and 1963 elections but was not successful.

== Later life ==
English died on 5 August 1974 in Brisbane. He was buried in Pinnaroo Cemetery on 7 August 1974.

== See also ==
- Members of the Queensland Legislative Assembly, 1953–1956
- Members of the Queensland Legislative Assembly, 1956–1957
- Candidates of the Queensland state election, 1960
- Candidates of the Queensland state election, 1963

Parliament of Queensland
Preceded by Robert Watson	Member for Mulgrave; 1953–1957	Succeeded by Robert Watson
