= Curtis Pitt =

Australian politician (born 1977)

The Honourable Curtis Pitt MP
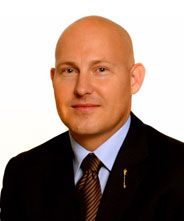

39th Speaker of the Queensland Legislative Assembly
- In office 13 February 2018 – 26 November 2024
- Deputy: Scott Stewart
- Preceded by: Peter Wellington
- Succeeded by: Pat Weir

Treasurer of Queensland
- In office 14 February 2015 – 12 December 2017
- Premier: Annastacia Palaszczuk
- Preceded by: Tim Nicholls
- Succeeded by: Jackie Trad

Minister for Sport
- In office 7 December 2015 – 12 December 2017
- Premier: Annastacia Palaszczuk
- Preceded by: Bill Byrne (Sport and Racing)
- Succeeded by: Mick de Brenni

Minister for Aboriginal and Torres Strait Islander Partnerships of Queensland
- In office 14 February 2015 – 12 December 2017
- Premier: Annastacia Palaszczuk
- Preceded by: Glen Elmes (Aboriginal and Torres Strait Islander Affairs)
- Succeeded by: Jackie Trad

Minister for Employment and Industrial Relations of Queensland
- In office 14 February 2015 – 7 December 2015
- Premier: Annastacia Palaszczuk
- Preceded by: John-Paul Langbroek (Employment)
- Succeeded by: Grace Grace

Shadow Treasurer of Queensland
- In office 19 April 2012 – 14 February 2015
- Leader: Annastacia Palaszczuk
- Preceded by: Tim Nicholls
- Succeeded by: John-Paul Langbroek

Manager of Opposition Business in Queensland
- In office 19 April 2012 – 31 January 2015
- Leader: Annastacia Palaszczuk
- Preceded by: Rosemary Menkens
- Succeeded by: Ray Stevens

Minister for Disabilities, Mental Health and Aboriginal and Torres Strait Islander Partnerships of Queensland
- In office 21 February 2011 – 26 March 2012
- Premier: Anna Bligh
- Preceded by: Annastacia Palaszczuk (Disabilities); Desley Boyle (Partnerships)
- Succeeded by: Tracy Davis (Disability Services); Jack Dempsey (politician) (Partnerships)

Member of the Queensland Parliament for Mulgrave
- In office 21 March 2009 – 26 October 2024
- Preceded by: Warren Pitt
- Succeeded by: Terry James

Personal details
- Born: Curtis Warren Pitt; 1 February 1977 (age 49) Cairns, Queensland
- Party: Labor
- Parent: Warren Pitt (father)
- Education: James Cook University; University of Queensland
- Website: www.curtispitt.com.au

Curtis Warren Pitt (born 1 February 1977) is an Australian politician who has been a Labor Party member of the Legislative Assembly of Queensland from 2009 until 2024, representing the district of Mulgrave. On 14 February 2015, he was sworn in as Treasurer of Queensland.

He was later elected Speaker of the Queensland Legislative Assembly on 13 February 2018, the first sitting day after the 2017 Queensland state election.

== Early life ==
Pitt was born in Cairns in Far North Queensland and raised in Gordonvale. He attended Gordonvale Primary School, Gordonvale High School, and completed his secondary education at St Mary's Catholic College in Woree. He has a Bachelor of Arts in politics from James Cook University in Cairns.

His father, Warren Pitt, was the member for Mulgrave from 1989 to 1995, when he was defeated by the National Party's Naomi Wilson, and again from 1998 to 2009.

== Career ==
Prior to announcing his intention to run for parliament, Pitt was head of the Queensland Government's Indigenous Jobs and Enterprises Taskforce. He had previously led the government's business and skilled migration program.

=== Bligh Government ===
Pitt was elected to the seat of Mulgrave, standing for the Labor Party, at the 2009 state election with a 48.51% primary vote and a two-candidate preferred vote (2CP) of 58.08. During his first term, Pitt was Deputy Government Whip (May 2010 – February 2011) and was appointed to the Bligh Ministry in the February 2011 reshuffle as Minister for Disabilities, Mental Health and Aboriginal and Torres Strait Islander Partnerships.

During his time in cabinet, he oversaw the launch of the Learning Earning Active Places (LEAP) strategy to close the gap for the nearly 80 per cent of Queenslanders who live in urban and regional areas who identify as Aboriginal or Torres Strait Islanders. In 2011 he also released 'Just Futures', the Queensland Government's Aboriginal and Torres Strait Islander justice strategy to reduce the over-representation of Indigenous people in the criminal justice system. During NAIDOC 2011, he launched the 'Deadly Stories' campaign.

As Minister for Disability Services, he released 'Absolutely Everybody' – Queensland's ground breaking 10-year disability strategy, as well as the Carer Action Plan 2011–14, which focuses on the varying needs of carers. He also introduced the Forensic Disability Act 2011 and the Forensic Disability Service which provides a therapeutic model of support for those people on forensic orders with a sole diagnosis of intellectual or cognitive impairment. He was also a member of the COAG Select-Council working with the Australian Government to lay the foundations for the National Disability Insurance Scheme (NDIS).

As Queensland's first Minister for Mental Health, he jointly launched the anti-stigma campaign 'Change Our Minds', followed soon after by the launch of a new mental health community services plan "Supporting Recovery 2011–2017". He also led the development of the first Mental Health Commission for Queensland – another major mental health reform which was later adopted in-part by the Newman LNP Government.

=== Opposition (2012–2015) ===
Pitt was re-elected at the 2012 state election, albeit with his primary vote down 14.51 percentage points and his two-party share reduced to 51.45%. Following the election, which resulted in a severely reduced caucus of seven members, Pitt was appointed Leader of Opposition Business and given the following shadow ministerial portfolios: Treasury and Trade; Energy and Water Supply; Main Roads; Aboriginal and Torres Strait Islander Partnerships, Sport and Recreation.

After two portfolio reshuffles following by-election wins by Yvette D'Ath (Redcliffe) and Anthony Lynham (Stafford), Pitt became Shadow Treasurer and Shadow Minister for Trade, Energy and Water Supply, and Aboriginal and Torres Strait Islander Partnerships. He retained the role of Leader of Opposition Business in the Parliament.

=== Palaszczuk Government ===
Following the Queensland state election on 31 January 2015, Pitt was sworn in as Treasurer in the Palaszczuk Ministry on 14 February 2015.

After the 2017 Queensland state election, Pitt was elected as the 39th Speaker of the Queensland Legislative Assembly.

== Other ==
Pitt was an Auxiliary Firefighter with the Queensland Fire and Rescue Service. He is a member of Lions Clubs International and state Patron of Stillbirth and Neonatal Death Support Queensland.

Political offices
Preceded by Tim Nicholls	Treasurer of Queensland; 2015–2017	Succeeded by Jackie Trad
Preceded by Annastacia Palaszczuk	Minister for Disabilities; 2011–2012	Succeeded by Tracy Davis
New title	Minister for Mental Health; 2011–2012	Succeeded by Lawrence Springborg as Minister for Health
Preceded by Desley Boyle	Minister for Aboriginal and Torres Strait Islander Partnerships; 2011–2012	Succeeded by Glen Elmes
Parliament of Queensland
Preceded by Warren Pitt	Member for Mulgrave; 2009–2024	Succeeded by Terry James
Preceded by Peter Wellington	Speaker of the Legislative Assembly of Queensland; 2018–2024	Succeeded by Pat Weir
