= Bill Lonergan =

Australian rules footballer

Personal information
- Full name: William Ambrose Lonergan
- Born: 4 July 1884; Yarrawonga, Victoria
- Died: 13 August 1916 (aged 32); Yarrawonga, Victoria
- Height: 174 cm (5 ft 9 in)
- Weight: 79 kg (174 lb)

Playing career^{1}
Years	Club	Games (Goals)
1907	Essendon	1 (0)
- ^{1} Playing statistics correct to the end of 1907.

William Ambrose Lonergan (4 July 1884 – 13 August 1916) was an Australian rules footballer who played with Essendon in the Victorian Football League (VFL).
