= Terry James =

Australian politician

Terry James MP

Member of the Queensland Legislative Assembly for Mulgrave
- Incumbent
- Assumed office 26 October 2024
- Preceded by: Curtis Pitt

Personal details
- Born: Cairns, Queensland, Australia
- Party: Liberal National
- Children: 5
- Occupation: Politician; Licensed Building Designer
- Awards: National Medal (Australia)
- Website: terryjames.com.au

Terry James is an Australian politician. He was elected member of the Legislative Assembly of Queensland for Mulgrave in the 2024 Queensland state election.

James was born in Cairns and held local government positions for 22 years. He is married and father to five children. James attended primary school at Parramatta State School and high school at Trinity Bay State High School.

Prior to his election to the Legislative Assembly, James was the mayor of Cairns between December 2023 and March 2024.

Outside of politics, James is a licensed building designer and a former small business owner. He has previously volunteered for over 15 years with the Australian Volunteer Coast Guard (QF9 Cairns), earning him the National Medal for service.
