= Roy Armstrong =

Australian politician

Member of the Queensland Legislative Assembly for Mulgrave
- In office 23 July 1960 – 29 November 1980
- Preceded by: Carlisle Wordsworth
- Succeeded by: Max Menzel

Personal details
- Born: Roy Alexander Armstrong; 14 January 1914 Warwick, Queensland, Australia
- Died: 26 April 1991 (aged 77) Brisbane, Queensland, Australia
- Resting place: Mt Gravatt Cemetery
- Party: Country Party/National Party
- Spouse(s): Daphne Merle Bauld (m.1940 d.1976), Marie Veronica Thornton (née Forster) (m.1977 d.2006)
- Occupation: Sugarcane farmer

Roy Alexander Armstrong (14 January 1914 – 26 April 1991 ) was a member of the Queensland Legislative Assembly.

== Biography ==
Armstrong was born in Warwick, Queensland, the son of Samuel John Armstrong and his wife Ann Isabel (née Hall) and was educated at Warwick State School. After finishing his schooling he was a timber cutter and haulier before working as a sugarcane farmer.

On 4 March 1940 he married Daphne Merle Bauld and together had one son. Daphne died in 1976 and the following year he married Marie Veronica Diery (née Thornton) (died 2006). Armstrong died in Brisbane in April 1991 and was buried in Brisbane's Mt Gravatt Cemetery.

== Public career ==
Armstrong started out in politics as a councilor on the Mulgrave Shire Council between 1956 and 1961.

He joined the Queensland Parliament as the Country Party member for Mulgrave following the death of Carlisle Wordsworth in 1960. He went on to represent the electorate for twenty years before retiring at the 1980 Queensland state election.

He was a person in the old Country Party mould. In 1972 the government, of which Armstrong was a member, nominated Jim Houghton to be the Speaker, Armstrong went against his party and nominated Bill Longeran who won the ballot to become the Speaker. It was these actions which ensured that Armstrong would not become a minister during his time in the parliament. After his retirement from the parliament he would often be seen in the gallery during proceedings.

Parliament of Queensland
Preceded by Carlisle Wordsworth	Member for Mulgrave; 1960–1980	Succeeded by Max Menzel
