= Viv Cooper =

Australian politician

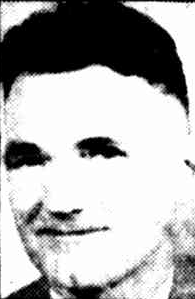

Member of the Queensland Legislative Assembly for Keppel
- In office 25 October 1952 – 3 August 1957
- Preceded by: Walter Ingram
- Succeeded by: Merv Thackeray

Personal details
- Born: Vivian Joseph Northcote Cooper; 19 June 1909 Parkhurst, Queensland, Australia
- Died: 10 September 2000 (aged 91) Brisbane, Queensland, Australia
- Party: Queensland Labor Party
- Other political affiliations: Labor
- Spouse: Catherine Elizabeth Hood (m.1933 d.2002)
- Occupation: Coach painter and signwriter for Queensland Railways

Vivian Joseph Northcote Cooper (19 June 1909 – 10 September 2000) was a member of the Queensland Legislative Assembly.

== Biography ==
Cooper was born at Parkhurst, a suburb in Rockhampton, Queensland, the son of Joseph Cooper and his wife Norah (née Dooley). He was educated at Parkhurst State School, Nobbs Street Convent, and the Christian Brothers College in Rockhampton. After leaving school he worked as a coach painter and signwriter for the Queensland Railways until 1952 and after his defeat in politics was the chief inspector for the Queensland Fish Marketing Board until his retirement in 1974.

On 4 September 1933 Cooper married Catherine Elizabeth Hood (died 2002) and together had three sons and a daughter. Cooper died in Brisbane in September 2000 and was cremated at the Albany Creek Crematorium.

== Public career ==
Cooper, representing Labor, won the 1952 by-election to replace Walter Ingram who had died earlier in the year. He went on to hold the seat until the 1957 Queensland state election when, as a member of the newly formed Queensland Labor Party, he lost the seat to the ALP candidate, Merv Thackeray.

Parliament of Queensland
Preceded by Walter Ingram	Member for Keppel; 1952–1957	Succeeded by Merv Thackeray
