= Carlisle Wordsworth =

Australian politician (1908–1960)

Member of the Queensland Legislative Assembly for Cook
- In office 29 April 1950 – 7 March 1953
- Preceded by: Harold Collins
- Succeeded by: Bunny Adair

Member of the Queensland Legislative Assembly for Mulgrave
- In office 6 June 1959 – 7 May 1960
- Preceded by: Bob Watson
- Succeeded by: Roy Armstrong

Personal details
- Born: Carlisle Favell Wordsworth; 21 October 1908 Mount Molloy, Queensland, Australia
- Died: 7 May 1960 (aged 58) Gordonvale, Queensland, Australia
- Resting place: Gordonvale Cemetery
- Party: Country Party
- Spouse: Ailsa Mary Williams (m.1934 d.1987)
- Occupation: Industrial Advocate

Carlisle Favell Wordsworth (21 October 1908 – 7 May 1960) was a member of the Queensland Legislative Assembly.

== Biography ==
Wordsworth was born in Mount Molloy, Queensland, the son of Arthur John Wordsworth and his wife Lillian Justitia (née Carlisle). He was educated at Gordonvale State School and did night classes at Cairns High School before starting his working career as a locomotive fireman and engine driver at the Mulgrave Central Mill from 1923 until 1925. He then worked at the Mulgrave Cooperative Sugar Mill from 1929 until 1940 at which time he joined the Second Australian Imperial Force, working as a liaison officer with the United States army. He was discharged in 1946 with the rank of major and after working for the International Boring Company as a traveler he was an industrial advocate for the Queensland Cane Growers Association and District Secretary of the Cairns Cane Growers Association.

On 8 September 1934 Wordsworth married Ailsa Mary Williams (d. 1987) and together had two sons. He died in May 1960 and was buried in the Gordonvale Cemetery.

== Public career ==
Wordsworth, a member of the Country Party, won the seat of Cook at the 1950 Queensland state election. He held it until the 1953 election when he was defeated by the Labor candidate, Bunny Adair.

He did not stand at the following election in 1956, but in 1957 he once again stood for the seat of Cook and was once again beaten by Bunny Adair. Wordsworth then won the by-election held in 1959 for the seat of Mulgrave after the death of Bob Watson but he died in office in May the next year.

Parliament of Queensland
Preceded by Harold Collins	Member for Cook; 1950–1953	Succeeded by Bunny Adair
Preceded by Bob Watson	Member for Mulgrave; 1959–1960	Succeeded by Roy Armstrong
