= Mick Gardner =

Australian politician

Mick Gardner OBE
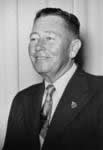

Member of the Queensland Legislative Assembly for Rockhampton
- In office 19 May 1956 – 28 May 1960
- Preceded by: James Larcombe
- Succeeded by: Seat abolished

Personal details
- Born: Harold Raymond Gardner; 12 January 1899 Sydney, New South Wales, Australia
- Died: 17 February 1981 (aged 82) Rockhampton, Queensland, Australia
- Party: Queensland Labor Party
- Other political affiliations: Labor
- Spouse: Alice Rose Aitken (m.1921 )
- Occupation: Garage proprietor, Trade union secretary

Harold Raymond "Mick" Gardner OBE (12 January 1899 – 17 February 1981) was an Australian politician. He was the member for Rockhampton in the Legislative Assembly of Queensland from 1956 to 1960, initially for the Labor Party and then from 1957 as part of the right-wing breakaway Queensland Labor Party. He contested the federal seat of Capricornia five times: for the ALP in 1949, 1951, 1954 and 1958 and for the QLP in 1961.

Parliament of Queensland
Preceded by James Larcombe	Member for Rockhampton; 1956–1960	Abolished
