= Bob Watson (Australian politician) =

Australian politician (1896–1959)

Member of the Queensland Legislative Assembly for Mulgrave
- In office 29 April 1950 – 7 March 1953
- Preceded by: New seat
- Succeeded by: Charles English
- In office 3 August 1957 – 26 March 1959
- Preceded by: Charles English
- Succeeded by: Carlisle Wordsworth

Personal details
- Born: Robert Hodgson Watson; 12 October 1896 Durham, England
- Died: 26 March 1959 (aged 62) Coorparoo, Queensland, Australia
- Party: Country Party
- Spouse: Ethel Agnes Mutch (m. 1920; died 1959)
- Occupation: Sugarcane farmer

Robert Hodgson Watson (12 October 1896 – 26 March 1959) was an Australian politician who served as a member of the Queensland Legislative Assembly.

== Biography ==
Watson was born in Yorkshire, England, the son of William Watson and his wife Elizabeth Ann (née Forster) and came to Australia at an early age. He was educated to primary level and after he finished his schooling, he worked at the family sugarcane farm at Mourilyan before working on farms at Mossman and Edmonton. He was also an inspector and Chairman of Directors at the Babinda Central Mill.

On 8 December 1920 Watson married Ethel Agnes Mutch (died 1981) and together had two daughters. He died in Coorparoo, Brisbane, in March 1959 and was cremated at the Mt Thompson Crematorium.

== Public career ==
Watson started out in politics as a councillor on the Mulgrave Shire Council and went on to be chairman of the shire for eleven years.

A member of the Country Party, Watson won the seat of Mulgrave at the 1950 Queensland state election, beating Charles English of the Labor Party, W.F. Falls of the Communist Party and G.A. Groth of the North Queensland Labor Party. He held the seat for three years before being defeated by Charles English in 1953.

He stood at the 1956 Queensland state election but was again beaten by English, but at the state election the next year he once again won Mulgrave, beating English who by now had joined the Queensland Labor Party. Watson became ill during the 1959 parliamentary sittings and died a few days later. He was the executive officer of the Australian Sugar Producers' Association and executive of the District Cane Growers Association. He was also a member of Rotary and a Freemason.

Parliament of Queensland
New seat	Member for Mulgrave; 1950–1953	Succeeded by Charles English
Preceded by Charles English	Member for Mulgrave; 1957–1959	Succeeded by Carlisle Wordsworth
