= Bunny Adair =

Australian politician (1905–1994)

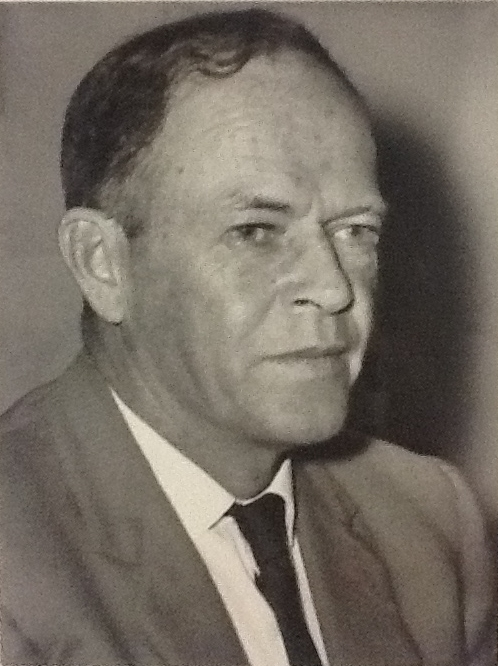
- Adair in 1953

Member of the Queensland Legislative Assembly for Cook
- In office 7 March 1953 – 17 May 1969
- Preceded by: New seat
- Succeeded by: Bill Wood

Personal details
- Born: Herbert Arthur Adair; 23 August 1905 Wolfram Camp, Queensland, Australia
- Died: 10 October 1994 (aged 89) North Queensland, Queensland, Australia
- Resting place: Martyn Street Cemetery
- Party: Independent
- Other political affiliations: Labor, Queensland Labor Party
- Spouse: Gladys Hannah Down (m.1928 d.1981)
- Children: Carmel Ruby Adair
- Occupation: Miner, Canecutter, Publican

Herbert Arthur "Bunny" Adair (23 August 1905 – 10 October 1994) was a politician in Queensland, Australia. He was a member of the Queensland Legislative Assembly.

== Early life ==
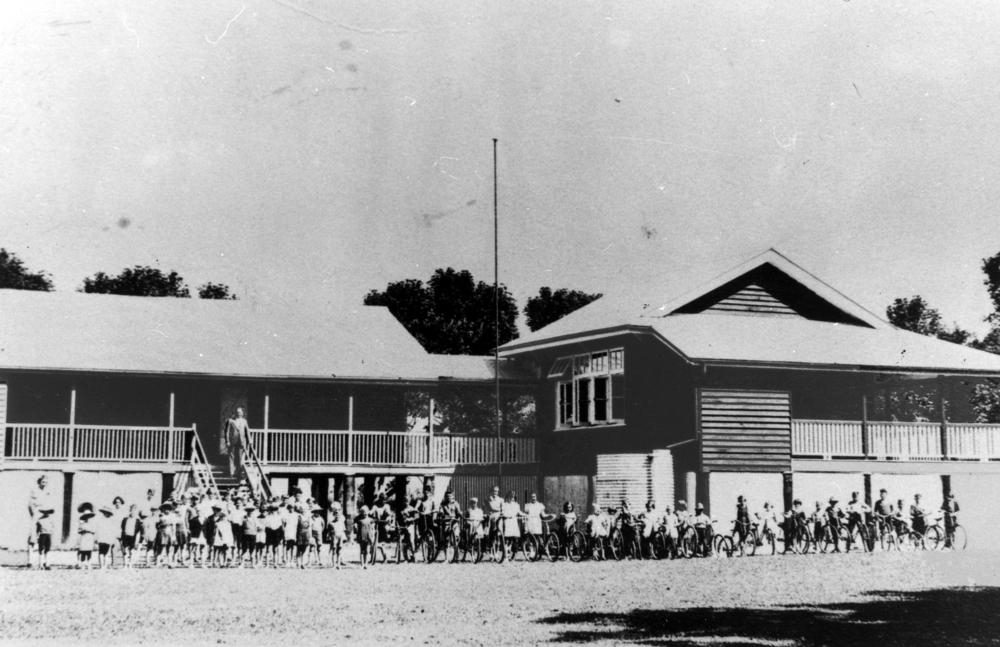
Aloomba State School, circa 1914

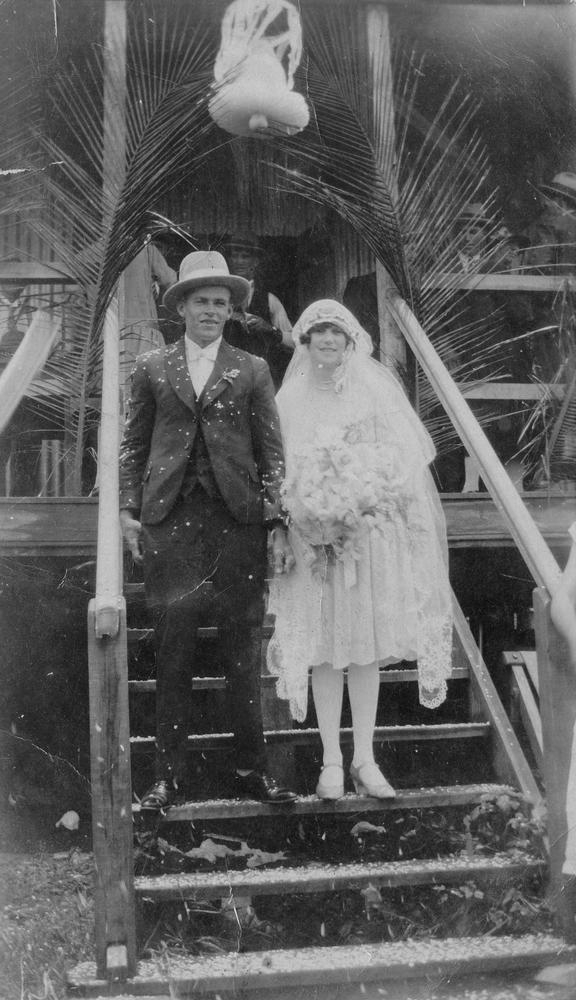
Bunny Adair and Gladys Down, Freshwater Hall near Cairns after their marriage, 1928

Herbert Arthur Adair was born 23 August 1905 at Wolfram Camp, Queensland, Australia, the son of Cecil Henry Adair and his wife Helen (née Barratt). Adair was educated at state schools in Herberton, Wolfram and Aloomba and at the Mount Carmel College, Charters Towers. In 1926, he moved to Freshwater where he resided for the rest of his life. He had a varied career as a miner, cane cutter, cane farmer, contract carrier and publican.

On 15 February 1928, Adair married Gladys Hannah Down (daughter of the publican of the Freshwater Hotel) at Freshwater (near Cairns). The couple had two sons and a daughter. In later years, Bunny and Gladys ran the Freshwater Hotel.

During World War II, Adair served in the 2nd Second Australian Imperial Force (AIF), Armoured Division, and 17 Field Regiment, 5th Division.

== Politics ==
Adair served as a councillor in the Mulgrave Shire Council from 1939 to 1946. On 7 March 1953, he was elected to the Queensland parliament as the member for Cook representing the Labor Party. From 26 April 1957 to 1 June 1963, he was a member of the Queensland Labor Party and, from 1 June 1963 to 17 May 1969, he represented Cook as an independent. Adair did not contest the 1969 election in which Bill Wood won Cook for the Labor Party.

== Missing and rescue ==
On 27 July 1954, Bunny Adair, an experienced bushman, set out from Cape Tribulation to walk 20 miles (32 km) to Bloomfield, to inspect the country through which local people wanted to build a road. He was expected to arrive the following day and the alarm was raised when he did not appear. The police organised search parties. On Friday 30 July, a man was spotted on the beach about 7 miles (11 km) north of Cape Tribulation by Australian National Airways pilot Bob Rowell who was conducting an air search in an Auster aircraft. Rowell dropped a note onto the beach asking "Who are you?". The man responded by writing "Bunny Adair" with a stick in the sand. A note was then dropped telling him to stay put and another pilot did an aerial drop of food and cigarettes. The tug Tully Falls was dispatched from Port Douglas to rescue Adair.

Rough seas prevented the tug from rescuing Adair and so an aerial ambulance (an Auster) made a hazardous landing on the beach at Cape Tribulation and Adair walked down the beach to be rescued from there. He explained that he had encountered impenetrable jungle about 2 miles (3 km) from Bloomfield and had been forced to return to the coast. He had had little food left when the search aircraft spotted him. Adair was flown back to his home in Cairns, described as very tired but otherwise in good health.

== Later life ==
Bunny Adair died on 21 October 1994 in North Queensland. On 25 October, a requiem mass was held at St Monica's Cathedral, Cairns, after which he was buried with his wife in the Martyn Street cemetery in Cairns.

== Legacy ==
Bunny Adair Park on Lower Freshwater Road, Freshwater, was named after him. Adair Street in Yorkeys Knob was named after him.

== See also ==
- Members of the Queensland Legislative Assembly, 1953–1956; 1956–1957; 1957–1960; 1960–1963; 1963–1966; 1966–1969

Parliament of Queensland
New seat	Member for Cook; 1953–1969	Succeeded by Bill Wood
