= Electoral district of Haughton =

Haughton Queensland—Legislative Assembly
- State: Queensland
- Created: 1950
- Abolished: 1960
- Namesake: Haughton River
- Demographic: Northern Rural
- Coordinates: 19°37′S 147°06′E

The electoral district of Haughton was a Legislative Assembly electorate in the state of Queensland, Australia. It was first created in a redistribution ahead of the 1950 state election, and existed until the 1960 state election.

Haughton was located south of Townsville and incorporated much of the former districts of Mundingburra and Kennedy.

Haughton was abolished in 1960, replaced by Burdekin.

== Members for Haughton ==
The elected members for Haughttn were:

Member	Party	Term
Colin McCathie	Labor	1950–1957
Colin McCathie	Queensland Labor	1957–1960

== See also ==
- Electoral districts of Queensland
- Members of the Queensland Legislative Assembly by year
- Category:Members of the Queensland Legislative Assembly by name
