= Norm Smith (Australian politician) =

Australian politician (1901–1983)

Member of the Queensland Legislative Assembly for Carpentaria
- In office 29 March 1941 – 28 May 1960
- Preceded by: John Mullan
- Succeeded by: Seat abolished

Personal details
- Born: Alfred James Smith; 23 March 1901 Brisbane, Queensland, Australia
- Died: 9 July 1983 (aged 82) Mount Isa, Queensland, Australia
- Resting place: Sunset Lawn Cemetery
- Party: QLP
- Other political affiliations: Labor
- Spouse: Emma Kryestine Jensen (m.1927 d.1983)
- Occupation: Businessman

Alfred James "Norm" Smith (23 March 1901 – 9 July 1983) was a businessman, and member of the Queensland Legislative Assembly.

== Early days ==
Smith was born in Brisbane, Queensland, to parents Harry Smith, a navvy in the railways, and his wife Emma (née Elms). Due to his father's job, his family moved many times and he was educated at 15 different schools and the longest he stayed at any one school was 12 months.

After he left school he began working as an assistant tapper at the Kuridala Copper Smelter but the smelter closed in 1918. He then was a mail carrier with his father in Selwyn-Boulia, and in 1923 he moved to Mt Isa where he worked as a truck driver for Mount Isa Mines. By 1932 he was a research chemist's assistant and in 1934 he acquired his father's business, a hotel, the Star Theatre, and an ice works.

== Political career ==
In 1926, Smith founded the Mount Isa Branch of the Federated Engine Drivers and Firemen's Association and was a committee member of the Australian Workers' Union in 1929. He began his political career as a councillor with the Cloncurry Shire in 1935, serving for the next ten years.

He next stood for the seat of Carpentaria in the Queensland Legislative Assembly at the 1941 state election, narrowly winning against the independent, J.T. Boyd. He went on to hold the seat until it was abolished in 1960. He then stood for the seat of Burke but was defeated by Labor's Alec Inch. In 1957 he had joined with Premier Vince Gair and most of his Cabinet to form the Queensland Labor Party.

== Personal life ==
On 10 February 1927, Smith married Emma Kryestine Jensen (died 1983) and together had two sons and one daughter. He died on 9 July 1983 and was buried at Mt Isa's Sunset Lawn Cemetery. At his funeral, a police escort led almost 100 cars in the procession to the cemetery.

Parliament of Queensland
| Preceded by John Mullan | Member for Carpentaria; 1941–1960 | Abolished |
