= Electoral district of Mulgrave (Queensland) =

State electoral district of Queensland, Australia

Mulgrave Queensland—Legislative Assembly
- Electoral map of Mulgrave 2017
- State: Queensland
- Dates current: 1873–1888; 1950–present
- MP: Terry James
- Party: Liberal National
- Namesake: Mulgrave River
- Electors: 35,635 (2020)
- Area: 819 km^{2} (316.2 sq mi)
- Demographic: Provincial and rural
- Coordinates: 17°13′S 145°51′E
Electorates around Mulgrave:
| Barron River | Cairns | Coral Sea |
| Cook | Mulgrave | Coral Sea |
| Hill | Hill | Hill |

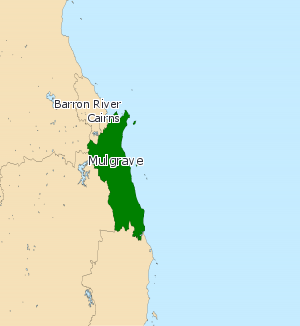
Electoral map of Mulgrave 2008

Mulgrave is an electoral district of the Legislative Assembly in the Australian state of Queensland.

The district in its present form is a narrow coastal strip running from the southern suburbs of Cairns to Deer at its southern end. Mulgrave also includes the town of Gordonvale. The electorate was first created for the 1950 election.

There was an earlier district also called Mulgrave that existed from 1873 to 1888. It was based on the town of Bundaberg and was replaced by the new electoral district of Bundaberg by the Electoral Districts Act of 1887.

== Members for Mulgrave ==
First incarnation (1873–1888)
| Member | Party | Term |
|---|---|---|
| Walter Scott | Squatter conservative | 1873–1878 |
| Thomas McIlwraith | Conservative leader | 1878–1886 |
| Walter Adams | Unaligned | 1886–1888 |
Second incarnation (1950–present)
| Member | Party | Term |
| Bob Watson | Country | 1950–1953 |
| Charles English | Labor | 1953–1957 |
| Charles English | Queensland Labor | 1957 |
| Bob Watson | Country | 1957–1959 |
| Carlisle Wordsworth | Country | 1959–1960 |
| Roy Armstrong | Country | 1960–1974 |
| Roy Armstrong | National | 1974–1980 |
| Max Menzel | National | 1980–1989 |
| Warren Pitt | Labor | 1989–1995 |
| Naomi Wilson | National | 1995–1998 |
| Charles Rappolt | One Nation | 1998 |
| Warren Pitt | Labor | 1998–2009 |
| Curtis Pitt | Labor | 2009–2024 |
| Terry James | Liberal National | 2024–present |

== Election results ==
2024 Queensland state election: Mulgrave
| Party | Candidate | Votes | % | ±% |
|---|---|---|---|---|
| Liberal National | Terry James | 8,369 | 27.44 | +1.74 |
| Labor | Richie Bates | 7,384 | 24.21 | −25.59 |
| Katter's Australian | Steven Lesina | 4,934 | 16.18 | +4.28 |
| One Nation | Michael McInnes | 2,654 | 8.70 | +2.30 |
| Independent | David Raymond | 2,056 | 6.74 | +6.74 |
| Legalise Cannabis | Nicholas Daniels | 1,804 | 5.92 | +5.92 |
| Greens | Peter Everett | 1,289 | 4.23 | −1.97 |
| Independent | Yodie Batzke | 1,044 | 3.42 | +3.42 |
| Family First | Leslie Searle | 593 | 2.0 | +2.0 |
| Independent | Ian Floyd | 370 | 1.21 | +1.21 |
| Total formal votes | | 30,497 | 93.51 | |
| Informal votes | | 2,115 | 6.51 | |
| Turnout | | 32,612 | 81.75 | |
Two-party-preferred result
| Liberal National | Terry James | 16,066 | 52.68 | +14.88 |
| Labor | Richie Bates | 14,431 | 47.28 | −14.88 |
| Liberal National gain from Labor | | Swing | +14.88 | |
