= Colin McCathie =

Australian politician

Member of the Queensland Legislative Assembly for Haughton
- In office 29 April 1950 – 28 May 1960
- Preceded by: New seat
- Succeeded by: Seat abolished

Personal details
- Born: Colin George McCathie; 9 May 1910 Gympie, Queensland, Australia
- Died: 1 September 1986 (aged 76) Sandgate, Queensland, Australia
- Party: QLP
- Other political affiliations: Labor
- Spouse: Hazel Olive Whitchurch (m.1942)
- Education: University of Queensland
- Occupation: Accountant

Colin George McCathie (9 May 1910 – 1 September 1986) was an Australian accountant and politician. He was a member of the Queensland Legislative Assembly.

== Biography ==
McCathie was born in Gympie, Queensland, to parents George Critchley McCathie and his wife Isabella Falconer (née McLeod). He was educated at One Mile Boys' State School in Gympie, Gympie High School, and the University of Queensland where he graduated as a Bachelor of Arts. For ten years from 1927 he was a school teacher at Gympie, Emerald, and Mount Coolum before becoming a bus proprietor in Ayr for eight years. He practiced accountancy and real estate in Ayr from 1946 until 1950.

On the 1 January 1942, McCathie married Hazel Olive Whitchurch and together had one son. He died in September 1986 at Sandgate in Brisbane.

== Public career ==
Chairman of the Ayr Shire Council from 1946 to 1952, McCathie won the new seat of Haughton at the 1950 Queensland state election for the Labor Party. He remained the member until the district was abolished before the 1960 state elections. In 1957, he joined with Premier Vince Gair and most of his cabinet in forming the breakaway Queensland Labor Party.

Besides his involvement in politics he was secretary of the Ayr Show Society and vice-president of the North Queensland Rugby League. He was a member of the Lions Club and its District Governor in 1970.

Parliament of Queensland
New seat	Member for Haughton; 1950–1960	Abolished
