= Electoral results for the district of Windsor (Queensland) =

Queensland, Australia, district election results

This is a list of electoral results for the electoral district of Windsor in Queensland state elections.

== Members for Windsor ==
Member	Party	Term
Hugh Macrossan	Liberal	1912–1915
Herbert McPhail	Labor	1915–1918
Charles Taylor	National; United; Country and Progressive National	1918–1935
Herbert Williams	Labor	1935–1941
Harry Moorhouse	Independent Democrat	1941–1944
Bruce Pie	Queensland People's	1944–1950
Tom Rasey	Labor	1950–1957
Tom Rasey	Queensland Labor	1957
Ray Smith	Liberal	1957–1969
Bob Moore	Liberal	1969–1983
Bob Moore	National	1983
Pat Comben	Labor	1983–1992

== Election results ==
=== Elections in the 1980s ===
1989 Queensland state election: Windsor
Party	Candidate	Votes	%	±%
Labor	Pat Comben	11,468	62.3	+10.5
Liberal	Kaye Harcourt	4,742	25.8	+4.6
National	Andrew Hassall	2,196	11.9	−15.1
Total formal votes		18,406	97.4	−0.6
Informal votes		495	2.6	+0.6
Turnout		18,901	91.2	−0.2
Two-party-preferred result
Labor	Pat Comben	11,633	63.2	+5.5
Liberal	Kaye Harcourt	6,773	36.8	+36.8
Labor hold		Swing	+5.5	

1986 Queensland state election: Windsor
Party	Candidate	Votes	%	±%
Labor	Pat Comben	9,211	51.8	+4.4
National	Bob Moore	4,800	27.0	−5.4
Liberal	Karen Muir-McCarey	3,775	21.2	+1.1
Total formal votes		17,786	98.0	
Informal votes		367	2.0	
Turnout		18,153	91.4	
Two-party-preferred result
Labor	Pat Comben	10,263	57.7	+3.0
National	Bob Moore	7,523	42.3	−3.0
Labor hold		Swing	+3.0	

1983 Queensland state election: Windsor
Party	Candidate	Votes	%	±%
Labor	Pat Comben	6,868	47.4	+2.4
National	Bob Moore	4,696	32.4	+32.4
Liberal	Ann Garms	2,915	20.1	−27.1
Total formal votes		14,479	98.7	+0.2
Informal votes		195	1.3	−0.2
Turnout		14,674	92.7	+3.5
Two-party-preferred result
Labor	Pat Comben	7,549	52.1	+3.4
National	Bob Moore	6,930	47.9	+47.9
Labor gain from Liberal		Swing	+3.4	

1980 Queensland state election: Windsor
Party	Candidate	Votes	%	±%
Liberal	Bob Moore	6,685	47.5	−7.0
Labor	Frank Melit	6,323	45.0	−0.5
Independent	Louis McKenzie	1,055	7.5	+7.5
Total formal votes		14,063	98.5	+0.1
Informal votes		218	1.5	−0.1
Turnout		14,281	89.2	−0.5
Two-party-preferred result
Liberal	Bob Moore	7,213	51.3	−3.2
Labor	Frank Melit	6,850	48.7	+3.2
Liberal hold		Swing	−3.2	

=== Elections in the 1970s ===
1977 Queensland state election: Windsor
Party	Candidate	Votes	%	±%
Liberal	Bob Moore	7,736	54.5	−6.5
Labor	Louis McKenzie	6,462	45.5	+13.3
Total formal votes		14,198	98.4	
Informal votes		227	1.6	
Turnout		14,425	89.7	
Liberal hold		Swing	−9.3	

1974 Queensland state election: Windsor
Party	Candidate	Votes	%	±%
Liberal	Bob Moore	7,505	61.0	+17.5
Labor	Gloria Markland	3,960	32.2	−11.6
Queensland Labor	Anne Wenck	484	3.9	−8.8
Independent	Mervyn Chambers	358	2.9	+2.9
Total formal votes		12,307	98.5	−0.2
Informal votes		185	1.5	+0.2
Turnout		12,492	89.7	−3.9
Two-party-preferred result
Liberal	Bob Moore	8,086	65.7	+10.6
Labor	Gloria Markland	4,221	34.3	−10.6
Liberal hold		Swing	+10.6	

1972 Queensland state election: Windsor
Party	Candidate	Votes	%	±%
Labor	Bryan Walsh	5,090	43.8	−1.8
Liberal	Bob Moore	5,060	43.5	+1.0
Queensland Labor	Thomas Heike	1,480	12.7	+0.8
Total formal votes		11,630	98.7	
Informal votes		157	1.3	
Turnout		11,787	93.6	
Two-party-preferred result
Liberal	Bob Moore	6,408	55.1	+1.6
Labor	Bryan Walsh	5,222	44.9	−1.6
Liberal hold		Swing	+1.6	

=== Elections in the 1960s ===
1969 Queensland state election: Windsor
Party	Candidate	Votes	%	±%
Labor	Keith Fordyce	4,607	45.6	+1.7
Liberal	Bob Moore	4,294	42.5	−6.3
Queensland Labor	John Dawson	1,198	11.9	+3.7
Total formal votes		10,099	98.6	0.0
Informal votes		138	1.4	0.0
Turnout		10,237	91.9	−1.9
Two-party-preferred result
Liberal	Bob Moore	5,196	51.5	−4.6
Labor	Keith Fordyce	4,903	48.5	+4.6
Liberal hold		Swing	−4.6	

1966 Queensland state election: Windsor
Party	Candidate	Votes	%	±%
Liberal	Ray Smith	5,049	48.3	−2.7
Labor	Keith Fordyce	4,546	43.5	+3.8
Queensland Labor	Vincent Wenck	851	8.1	−1.1
Total formal votes		10,446	98.6	0.0
Informal votes		151	1.4	0.0
Turnout		10,597	94.6	−0.7
Two-party-preferred result
Liberal	Ray Smith	5,860	56.1	−2.4
Labor	Keith Fordyce	4,546	43.9	+2.4
Liberal hold		Swing	−2.4	

1963 Queensland state election: Windsor
Party	Candidate	Votes	%	±%
Liberal	Ray Smith	5,369	51.0	+1.1
Labor	George Georgouras	4,180	39.7	+4.0
Queensland Labor	Owen O'Donoghue	971	9.2	−5.1
Total formal votes		10,520	98.6	−0.6
Informal votes		148	1.4	+0.6
Turnout		10,668	95.3	+1.8
Two-party-preferred result
Liberal	Ray Smith	6,159	58.5	
Labor	George Georgouras	4,361	41.5	
Liberal hold		Swing	N/A	

1960 Queensland state election: Windsor
Party	Candidate	Votes	%	±%
Liberal	Ray Smith	5,364	49.9	
Labor	George Georgouras	3,834	35.7	
Queensland Labor	Percy Hotham	1,541	14.3	
Total formal votes		10,739	99.2	
Informal votes		90	0.8	
Turnout		10,829	93.5	
Liberal hold		Swing		

=== Elections in the 1950s ===
1957 Queensland state election: Windsor
Party	Candidate	Votes	%	±%
Liberal	Ray Smith	3,760	38.9	−4.8
Queensland Labor	Tom Rasey	3,733	38.6	+38.6
Labor	Kenneth Kemshead	2,165	22.4	−33.9
Total formal votes		9,658	99.0	+0.2
Informal votes		100	1.0	−0.2
Turnout		9,758	95.3	+0.7
Liberal gain from Labor		Swing	N/A	

1956 Queensland state election: Windsor
Party	Candidate	Votes	%	±%
Labor	Tom Rasey	5,459	56.3	−3.9
Liberal	Margaret Gordon	4,240	43.7	+3.9
Total formal votes		9,699	98.8	−0.1
Informal votes		121	1.2	+0.1
Turnout		9,820	94.6	+0.5
Labor hold		Swing	−3.9	

1953 Queensland state election: Windsor
Party	Candidate	Votes	%	±%
Labor	Tom Rasey	6,011	60.2	+10.1
Liberal	John Cutting	3,980	39.8	−10.1
Total formal votes		9,901	98.9	−0.2
Informal votes		108	1.1	+0.2
Turnout		10,009	94.1	+0.5
Labor hold		Swing	+10.1	

1950 Queensland state election: Windsor
Party	Candidate	Votes	%	±%
Labor	Tom Rasey	5,213	50.1	
Liberal	Alexander Devene	5,184	49.9	
Total formal votes		10,397	99.1	
Informal votes		94	0.9	
Turnout		10,491	93.6	
Labor gain from Liberal		Swing		

=== Elections in the 1940s ===
1947 Queensland state election: Windsor
Party	Candidate	Votes	%	±%
People's Party	Bruce Pie	6,618	58.1	+6.9
Labor	Erle Wettemeyer	4,766	41.9	+1.1
Total formal votes		11,384	99.0	0.0
Informal votes		109	1.0	0.0
Turnout		11,493	92.4	+2.5
People's Party hold		Swing	+2.5	

1944 Queensland state election: Windsor
Party	Candidate	Votes	%	±%
People's Party	Bruce Pie	5,353	51.2	+37.3
Labor	William Hoy	4,266	40.8	−3.8
Independent	Harry Moorhouse	833	8.0	−33.5
Total formal votes		10,452	99.0	+0.4
Informal votes		106	1.0	−0.4
Turnout		10,558	89.9	−2.9
People's Party gain from Independent		Swing	N/A	

1941 Queensland state election: Windsor
Party	Candidate	Votes	%	±%
Labor	Herbert Williams	4,491	44.6	−1.6
Independent	Harry Moorhouse	4,185	41.5	+41.5
United Australia	Neil O'Sullivan	1,401	13.9	−21.4
Total formal votes		10,077	98.6	−0.2
Informal votes		138	1.4	+0.2
Turnout		10,215	92.8	−1.8
Two-candidate-preferred result
Independent	Harry Moorhouse	4,647	50.3	+50.3
Labor	Herbert Williams	4,590	49.7	−5.0
Independent gain from Labor		Swing	N/A	

=== Elections in the 1930s ===
1938 Queensland state election: Windsor
Party	Candidate	Votes	%	±%
Labor	Herbert Williams	4,592	46.2	−11.3
United Australia	Edward Simpson	3,521	35.3	−7.2
Protestant Labour	Cecil Maxwell	1,291	13.0	+13.0
Independent Labor	Henry Bond	546	5.5	+5.5
Total formal votes		9,950	98.8	+0.3
Informal votes		124	1.2	−0.3
Turnout		10,074	94.6	+0.2
Two-party-preferred result
Labor	Herbert Williams	4,880	54.7	−2.8
United Australia	Edward Simpson	4,042	45.3	+2.8
Labor hold		Swing	−2.8	

1935 Queensland state election: Windsor
Party	Candidate	Votes	%	±%
Labor	Herbert Williams	5,253	57.5	
CPNP	Charles Taylor	3,886	42.5	
Total formal votes		9,139	98.5	
Informal votes		141	1.5	
Turnout		9,280	94.4	
Labor gain from CPNP		Swing		

1932 Queensland state election: Windsor
Party	Candidate	Votes	%	±%
CPNP	Charles Taylor	4,291	46.7	
Labor	Ernest Manchester	3,395	37.0	
Independent Labor	Donald MacKenzie	951	10.4	
Independent	Francis Corbett	541	5.9	
Total formal votes		9,178	99.1	
Informal votes		83	0.9	
Turnout		9,261	88.6	
Two-party-preferred result
CPNP	Charles Taylor	4,522	54.0	
Labor	Ernest Manchester	3,852	46.0	
CPNP hold		Swing		

=== Elections in the 1920s ===
1929 Queensland state election: Windsor
Party	Candidate	Votes	%	±%
CPNP	Charles Taylor	5,312	63.5	+5.2
Labor	Harry Nowotny	3,049	36.5	−5.2
Total formal votes		8,361	99.1	+0.2
Informal votes		74	0.9	−0.2
Turnout		8,435	92.6	+0.8
CPNP hold		Swing	+5.2	

1926 Queensland state election: Windsor
Party	Candidate	Votes	%	±%
CPNP	Charles Taylor	4,468	58.3	+0.7
Labor	Donald MacKenzie	3,193	41.7	−0.7
Total formal votes		7,661	98.9	−0.4
Informal votes		85	1.1	+0.4
Turnout		7,746	91.8	+4.0
CPNP hold		Swing	+0.7	

1923 Queensland state election: Windsor
Party	Candidate	Votes	%	±%
United	Charles Taylor	3,869	57.6	+3.0
Labor	Sidney Cook	2,843	42.4	−3.0
Total formal votes		6,712	99.3	+0.1
Informal votes		44	0.7	−0.1
Turnout		6,756	87.8	+0.7
United hold		Swing	+3.0	

1920 Queensland state election: Windsor
Party	Candidate	Votes	%	±%
National	Charles Taylor	5,567	54.6	+4.1
Labor	Herbert McPhail	4,627	45.4	−4.1
Total formal votes		10,194	99.2	−0.4
Informal votes		79	0.8	+0.4
Turnout		10,273	87.1	−0.5
National hold		Swing	+4.1	

=== Elections in the 1910s ===
1918 Queensland state election: Windsor
Party	Candidate	Votes	%	±%
National	Charles Taylor	4,373	50.5	+3.5
Labor	Herbert McPhail	4,281	49.5	−3.5
Total formal votes		8,654	99.6	+1.1
Informal votes		34	0.4	−1.1
Turnout		8,688	87.6	−3.6
National gain from Labor		Swing	+3.5	

1915 Queensland state election: Windsor
Party	Candidate	Votes	%	±%
Labor	Herbert McPhail	3,343	53.0	+10.1
Liberal	Hugh Macrossan	2,969	47.0	−10.1
Total formal votes		6,312	98.5	−0.8
Informal votes		97	1.5	+0.8
Turnout		6,409	91.2	+6.2
Labor gain from Liberal		Swing	+10.1	

1912 Queensland state election: Windsor
Party	Candidate	Votes	%	±%
Liberal	Hugh Macrossan	2,488	57.1	
Labor	Walter Crampton	1,837	42.9	
Total formal votes		4,285	99.3	
Informal votes		32	0.7	
Turnout		4,317	85.0	
Liberal hold		Swing		
