= Results of the 1944 Queensland state election =

Queensland state election, 15 April 1944 Legislative Assembly << 1941–1947 >>
Enrolled voters	585,727^{[1]}				
Votes cast	512,767		Turnout	87.54	–2.75
Informal votes	9,352		Informal	1.82	+0.02
Summary of votes by party
Party	Primary votes	%	Swing	Seats	Change
Labor	224,888	44.67	–6.74	37	–4
People's Party	124,437	24.72	+9.11	7	+3
Country	88,608	17.60	–3.29	12	–2
Communist	12,467	2.48	–0.61	1	+1
King O'Malley Labor	5,790	1.13	+1.13	1	± 1
Hermit Park Labor	5,521	1.08	+1.08	1	+ 1
Frank Barnes Labor	4,180	0.82	-0.20	1	± 1
Democratic	999	0.19	–1.75	0	–2
All Services Association of Australia	325	0.06	+0.06	0	± 0
Christian Socialist	325	0.06	+0.06	0	± 0
Independent	23,680	4.62	+0.55	1	+1
Total	503,415			62	

This is a list of electoral district results for the 1944 Queensland state election.

== Results by electoral district ==
=== Albert ===
1944 Queensland state election: Albert
Party	Candidate	Votes	%	±%
Country	Tom Plunkett	4,842	50.8	−11.6
Labor	John Rosser	3,037	31.9	−5.7
Independent Country	Edward Coghlan	1,654	17.3	+17.3
Total formal votes		9,533	99.1	+0.8
Informal votes		84	0.9	−0.8
Turnout		9,617	83.8	−3.5
Country hold		Swing	−2.9	

=== Aubigny ===
1944 Queensland state election: Aubigny
Party	Candidate	Votes	%	±%
Country	Jim Sparkes	5,620	68.2	+4.9
Labor	William Harth	2,614	31.8	−4.9
Total formal votes		8,234	99.2	−0.2
Informal votes		67	0.8	+0.2
Turnout		8,301	88.6	−4.4
Country hold		Swing	+4.9	

=== Barcoo ===
1944 Queensland state election: Barcoo
Party	Candidate	Votes	%	±%
Labor	Ned Davis	unopposed		
Labor hold		Swing		

=== Baroona ===
1944 Queensland state election: Baroona
Party	Candidate	Votes	%	±%
Labor	Bill Power	5,415	55.3	−4.6
People's Party	Richard Cooper	4,370	44.7	+4.6
Total formal votes		9,785	98.5	+0.9
Informal votes		147	1.5	−0.9
Turnout		9,932	88.0	−1.6
Labor hold		Swing	−4.6	

=== Bowen ===
1944 Queensland state election: Bowen
Party	Candidate	Votes	%	±%
Communist	Fred Paterson	3,434	44.4	−2.9
Labor	Ernest Riordan	2,988	38.6	−14.1
Country	Bill Hancock	1,310	16.9	+16.9
Total formal votes		7,732	99.0	+2.4
Informal votes		80	1.0	−2.4
Turnout		7,812	87.7	−3.3
Communist gain from Labor		Swing	+6.2	

=== Bremer ===
1944 Queensland state election: Bremer
Party	Candidate	Votes	%	±%
Labor	Frank Cooper	unopposed		
Labor hold		Swing		

=== Brisbane ===
1944 Queensland state election: Brisbane
Party	Candidate	Votes	%	±%
Labor	Johnno Mann	4,774	58.4	+1.0
People's Party	George Regan	3,396	41.6	+7.1
Total formal votes		8,170	97.6	0.0
Informal votes		200	2.4	0.0
Turnout		8,370	85.4	−1.4
Labor hold		Swing	−4.0	

=== Bulimba ===
1944 Queensland state election: Bulimba
Party	Candidate	Votes	%	±%
Independent Labor	George Marriott	4,577	41.8	+41.8
People's Party	Geoffrey Ward	3,680	33.6	+3.7
Labor	Bob Gardner	2,683	24.5	−45.6
Total formal votes		10,940	96.0	−1.4
Informal votes		459	4.0	+1.4
Turnout		11,399	94.8	+1.1
Independent Labor gain from Labor		Swing	N/A	

=== Bundaberg ===
1944 Queensland state election: Bundaberg
Party	Candidate	Votes	%	±%
Frank Barnes Labor	Frank Barnes	4,180	40.0	−11.1
Labor	Bernard McLean	3,495	33.4	−15.5
People's Party	Tom McCracken	2,218	21.2	+21.2
Independent Labor	Arthur Howe	432	4.1	+4.1
Independent	Alfred Maughan	136	1.3	+1.3
Total formal votes		10,461	98.3	+0.5
Informal votes		182	1.7	−0.5
Turnout		10,643	88.3	−5.1
Frank Barnes Labor hold		Swing	+3.4	

=== Buranda ===
1944 Queensland state election: Buranda
Party	Candidate	Votes	%	±%
Labor	Ted Hanson	5,569	50.7	−6.2
People's Party	Robert Roberts	5,417	49.3	+6.2
Total formal votes		10,986	98.9	+1.0
Informal votes		125	1.1	−1.0
Turnout		11,111	88.9	−2.6
Labor hold		Swing	−6.2	

=== Cairns ===
1944 Queensland state election: Cairns
Party	Candidate	Votes	%	±%
King O'Malley Labor	Lou Barnes	5,790	65.6	+65.6
Labor	Daniel Crowley	3,029	34.4	−21.0
Total formal votes		8,819	98.8	+0.3
Informal votes		109	1.2	−0.3
Turnout		8,928	79.6	−7.4
King O'Malley Labor hold		Swing	N/A	

=== Carnarvon ===
1944 Queensland state election: Carnarvon
Party	Candidate	Votes	%	±%
Labor	Paul Hilton	4,211	56.6	−43.4
Country	Harold Phillips	3,235	43.4	+43.4
Total formal votes		7,446	95.1	
Informal votes		386	4.9	
Turnout		7,832	88.1	
Labor hold		Swing	N/A	

=== Carpentaria ===
1944 Queensland state election: Carpentaria
Party	Candidate	Votes	%	±%
Labor	Norm Smith	2,969	57.5	+5.7
Independent Labor	James Boyd	1,834	35.5	−12.7
Independent	John Carson	208	4.0	+4.0
Independent	Bernard McInerney	155	3.0	+3.0
Total formal votes		5,166	98.7	+0.1
Informal votes		67	1.3	−0.1
Turnout		5,233	77.0	+4.3
Labor hold		Swing	+10.0	

=== Charters Towers ===
1944 Queensland state election: Charters Towers
Party	Candidate	Votes	%	±%
Labor	Arthur Jones	4,241	67.5	+4.3
Independent Labor	Syd Williams	2,344	32.5	−4.3
Total formal votes		6,285	98.2	−0.4
Informal votes		115	1.8	+0.4
Turnout		6,400	81.8	−1.1
Labor hold		Swing	+4.3	

=== Cook ===
1944 Queensland state election: Cook
Party	Candidate	Votes	%	±%
Labor	Harold Collins	3,845	54.6	−2.4
People's Party	Norman Fitchett	1,999	28.4	+28.4
Independent Labor	Jack Meehan	1,205	17.1	+17.1
Total formal votes		7,049	98.3	+2.9
Informal votes		119	1.7	−2.9
Turnout		7,168	82.0	−7.0
Labor hold		Swing	+8.8	

=== Cooroora ===
1944 Queensland state election: Cooroora
Party	Candidate	Votes	%	±%
Country	Harry Walker	5,486	62.5	−37.5
Labor	Robert Spencer	3,289	37.5	+37.5
Total formal votes		8,775	99.1	
Informal votes		79	0.9	
Turnout		8,854	89.0	
Country hold		Swing	N/A	

=== Cunningham ===
1944 Queensland state election: Cunningham
Party	Candidate	Votes	%	±%
Country	Malcolm McIntyre	5,542	67.2	+47.3
Labor	John Hilton	2,705	32.8	+0.1
Total formal votes		8,247	97.7	−1.5
Informal votes		192	2.3	+1.5
Turnout		8,439	92.1	0.0
Country gain from Independent		Swing	N/A	

=== Dalby ===
1944 Queensland state election: Dalby
Party	Candidate	Votes	%	±%
Labor	Aubrey Slessar	4,688	51.5	−4.5
Country	Charles Russell	4,409	48.5	+4.5
Total formal votes		9,097	94.4	−4.8
Informal votes		537	5.6	+4.8
Turnout		9,634	88.5	+1.4
Labor hold		Swing	−4.5	

=== East Toowoomba ===
1944 Queensland state election: East Toowoomba
Party	Candidate	Votes	%	±%
Country	Herbert Yeates	4,854	56.1	+1.9
Labor	Jim Thorpe	3,560	41.2	−4.6
Christian Socialist	K N Kunkel	230	2.7	+2.7
Total formal votes		8,644	98.7	+0.6
Informal votes		115	1.3	−0.6
Turnout		8,759	84.7	−8.8
Country hold		Swing	+3.5	

=== Enoggera ===
1944 Queensland state election: Enoggera
Party	Candidate	Votes	%	±%
People's Party	Kenneth Morris	5,436	45.3	+2.2
Independent Labor	George Taylor	3,927	32.7	+32.7
Labor	James Fraser	2,647	22.0	−28.5
Total formal votes		12,010	97.8	−0.5
Informal votes		267	2.2	+0.5
Turnout		12,277	93.4	0.0
People's Party gain from Labor		Swing	N/A	

=== Fassifern ===
1944 Queensland state election: Fassifern
Party	Candidate	Votes	%	±%
Country	Alf Muller	5,984	64.7	−0.7
Labor	Roy Richards	2,633	29.6	−5.7
Independent	Cyril Brosnan	275	3.1	+3.1
Independent	George Masen	166	1.9	+1.9
Total formal votes		8,891	95.8	−2.0
Informal votes		387	4.2	+2.0
Turnout		9,278	95.3	+2.3
Country hold		Swing	+4.1	

=== Fitzroy ===
1944 Queensland state election: Fitzroy
Party	Candidate	Votes	%	±%
Labor	Jim Clark	4,832	51.4	−48.6
People's Party	Harry Weir	4,563	48.6	+48.6
Total formal votes		9,395	99.0	
Informal votes		93	1.0	
Turnout		9,488	84.5	
Labor hold		Swing	N/A	

=== Fortitude Valley ===
1944 Queensland state election: Fortitude Valley
Party	Candidate	Votes	%	±%
Labor	Samuel Brassington	5,582	60.5	+4.0
People's Party	Annie Tipper	3,646	39.5	−4.0
Total formal votes		9,228	98.6	+0.6
Informal votes		135	1.4	−0.6
Turnout		9,363	88.2	−2.2
Labor hold		Swing	+4.0	

=== Gregory ===
1944 Queensland state election: Gregory
Party	Candidate	Votes	%	±%
Labor	George Devries	unopposed		
Labor hold		Swing		

=== Gympie ===
1944 Queensland state election: Gympie
Party	Candidate	Votes	%	±%
Labor	Thomas Dunstan	3,197	47.8	−4.6
People's Party	Niels Damm	2,923	43.7	+13.7
Independent	William Ebrington	572	8.5	+8.5
Total formal votes		6,692	99.5	0.0
Informal votes		33	0.5	0.0
Turnout		6,725	88.0	−5.3
Labor hold		Swing	−11.4	

=== Hamilton ===
1944 Queensland state election: Hamilton
Party	Candidate	Votes	%	±%
People's Party	John Chandler	7,916	75.2	+39.0
Labor	John Dixon	2,614	24.8	+24.8
Total formal votes		10,530	98.8	+0.8
Informal votes		125	1.2	−0.8
Turnout		10,655	88.4	−3.1
People's Party hold		Swing	N/A	

=== Herbert ===
1944 Queensland state election: Herbert
Party	Candidate	Votes	%	±%
Labor	Stephen Theodore	4,331	57.1	+0.9
Communist	Les Sullivan	3,261	42.9	+42.9
Total formal votes		7,592	96.9	−1.3
Informal votes		166	1.8	+1.3
Turnout		7,834	86.0	−5.7
Labor hold		Swing	N/A	

=== Ipswich ===
1944 Queensland state election: Ipswich
Party	Candidate	Votes	%	±%
Labor	David Gledson	unopposed		
Labor hold		Swing		

=== Isis ===
1944 Queensland state election: Isis
Party	Candidate	Votes	%	±%
Country	William Brand	4,901	64.5	+5.4
Labor	Frank Eastaughffe	2,694	35.5	−5.4
Total formal votes		7,595	96.0	−1.8
Informal votes		318	4.0	+1.8
Turnout		7,913	92.8	−2.7
Country hold		Swing	+5.4	

=== Ithaca ===
1944 Queensland state election: Ithaca
Party	Candidate	Votes	%	±%
Labor	Ned Hanlon	6,305	54.0	−2.9
People's Party	Reg Groom	5,162	44.2	+44.2
Independent	Jack McCallum	208	1.8	+1.8
Total formal votes		11,675	98.9	+0.3
Informal votes		132	1.1	−0.3
Turnout		11,807	91.7	−1.5
Labor hold		Swing	N/A	

=== Kelvin Grove ===
1944 Queensland state election: Kelvin Grove
Party	Candidate	Votes	%	±%
Labor	Bert Turner	6,011	53.1	+2.4
People's Party	Andrew Muir	5,309	46.9	+46.9
Total formal votes		11,320	98.7	0.0
Informal votes		147	1.3	0.0
Turnout		11,467	90.5	−1.8
Labor hold		Swing	N/A	

=== Kennedy ===
1944 Queensland state election: Kennedy
Party	Candidate	Votes	%	±%
Labor	Cecil Jesson	4,297	50.7	−7.0
Communist	John Clubley	2,220	26.2	+15.3
People's Party	Aubrey Jurd	1,954	23.1	+23.1
Total formal votes		8,471	97.9	−0.3
Informal votes		180	2.1	+0.3
Turnout		8,651	82.3	−6.1
Labor hold		Swing	N/A	

=== Keppel ===
1944 Queensland state election: Keppel
Party	Candidate	Votes	%	±%
Labor	Walter Ingram	3,184	40.1	+1.6
Country	Frank Saunders	2,466	31.0	−22.0
Independent	John Harding	2,292	28.9	+28.9
Total formal votes		7,942	95.0	−3.9
Informal votes		420	5.0	+3.9
Turnout		8,362	90.1	+0.1
Labor gain from Country		Swing	+14.3	

=== Kurilpa ===
1944 Queensland state election: Kurilpa
Party	Candidate	Votes	%	±%
Labor	Kerry Copley	5,504	53.5	+5.1
People's Party	Norman Brandon	4,780	46.5	0.0
Total formal votes		10,284	98.7	+0.3
Informal votes		135	1.3	−0.3
Turnout		10,419	85.0	−0.5
Labor hold		Swing	+2.5	

=== Logan ===
1944 Queensland state election: Logan
Party	Candidate	Votes	%	±%
People's Party	Thomas Hiley	7,434	52.7	+7.7
Labor	John Brown	6,680	47.3	−7.7
Total formal votes		14,114	98.8	+0.7
Informal votes		165	1.2	−0.7
Turnout		14,279	89.1	−2.7
People's Party gain from Labor		Swing	+7.7	

=== Mackay ===
1944 Queensland state election: Mackay
Party	Candidate	Votes	%	±%
Labor	Fred Graham	5,086	58.1	−9.4
People's Party	Ernie Evans	3,676	41.9	+41.9
Total formal votes		8,762	98.9	+0.7
Informal votes		96	1.1	−0.7
Turnout		8,858	82.2	−6.5
Labor hold		Swing	N/A	

=== Maranoa ===
1944 Queensland state election: Maranoa
Party	Candidate	Votes	%	±%
Labor	John Taylor	3,832	56.2	−3.0
Country	Henry Crothers	2,987	43.8	+3.0
Total formal votes		6,819	98.3	+0.1
Informal votes		116	1.7	−0.1
Turnout		6,935	81.6	−0.1
Labor hold		Swing	−3.0	

=== Maree ===
1944 Queensland state election: Maree
Party	Candidate	Votes	%	±%
Independent	Louis Luckins	5,294	53.3	+53.3
Labor	Jack McNulty	4,631	46.7	−3.1
Total formal votes		9,925	98.5	+2.0
Informal votes		152	1.5	−2.0
Turnout		10,077	85.7	−6.1
Independent gain from People's Party		Swing	N/A	

=== Maryborough ===
1944 Queensland state election: Maryborough
Party	Candidate	Votes	%	±%
Labor	David Farrell	unopposed		
Labor hold		Swing		

=== Merthyr ===
1944 Queensland state election: Merthyr
Party	Candidate	Votes	%	±%
Labor	Bill Moore	5,322	54.7	−3.7
People's Party	Leonard King	4,400	45.3	+3.7
Total formal votes		9,722	98.1	−0.2
Informal votes		184	1.9	+0.2
Turnout		9,906	88.7	−5.0
Labor hold		Swing	−3.7	

=== Mirani ===
1944 Queensland state election: Mirani
Party	Candidate	Votes	%	±%
Labor	Ted Walsh	3,769	47.6	−11.3
Country	Anthony Coyne	2,576	32.5	−8.6
Independent	John Mulherin	1,581	19.9	+19.9
Total formal votes		7,926	98.8	−0.2
Informal votes		96	1.2	+0.2
Turnout		8,022	84.5	−3.5
Labor hold		Swing	+0.5	

=== Mundingburra ===
1944 Queensland state election: Mundingburra
Party	Candidate	Votes	%	±%
Hermit Park Labor	Tom Aikens	3,658	35.6	+35.6
Labor	Lionel Tomlins	2,930	28.5	−27.8
Independent	Arthur Coburn	2,753	26.8	+26.8
People's Party	Harry Pass	763	7.4	+7.4
Independent Labor	Lionel Parsons	179	1.7	+1.7
Total formal votes		10,283	99.2	+1.6
Informal votes		83	0.8	−1.6
Turnout		10,366	87.2	−3.7
Hermit Park Labor gain from Labor		Swing	N/A	

=== Murrumba ===
1944 Queensland state election: Murrumba
Party	Candidate	Votes	%	±%
Country	Frank Nicklin	unopposed		
Country hold		Swing		

=== Nanango ===
1944 Queensland state election: Nanango
Party	Candidate	Votes	%	±%
Country	Jim Edwards	4,319	50.1	+5.0
Labor	Daniel Carroll	3,120	36.2	−4.6
Independent	George Anderson	1,176	13.7	−0.4
Total formal votes		8,615	99.1	−0.3
Informal votes		75	0.9	+0.3
Turnout		8,690	86.2	−4.8
Country hold		Swing	+5.5	

=== Normanby ===
1944 Queensland state election: Normanby
Party	Candidate	Votes	%	±%
Labor	Tom Foley	4,029	54.6	−3.6
Country	George Hamilton	3,346	45.4	+45.4
Total formal votes		7,375	98.7	−0.4
Informal votes		94	1.3	+0.4
Turnout		7,469	84.7	−0.8
Labor hold		Swing	N/A	

=== Nundah ===
1944 Queensland state election: Nundah
Party	Candidate	Votes	%	±%
Labor	John Hayes	5,862	51.6	−1.7
People's Party	William Cunningham	5,493	48.4	+1.7
Total formal votes		11,355	98.9	+0.5
Informal votes		125	1.1	−0.5
Turnout		11,480	90.4	−3.1
Labor hold		Swing	−1.7	

=== Oxley ===
1944 Queensland state election: Oxley
Party	Candidate	Votes	%	±%
People's Party	Tom Kerr	6,696	57.2	−4.3
Labor	Felix Dittmer	5,013	42.8	+4.3
Total formal votes		11,709	97.1	−1.0
Informal votes		352	2.9	+1.0
Turnout		12,061	91.1	−1.0
People's Party hold		Swing	−4.3	

=== Port Curtis ===
1944 Queensland state election: Port Curtis
Party	Candidate	Votes	%	±%
Labor	Tommy Williams	5,761	59.3	−5.0
Country	Samuel Halpin	3,955	40.7	+5.0
Total formal votes		9,716	98.9	0.0
Informal votes		103	1.1	0.0
Turnout		9,819	87.4	−3.4
Labor hold		Swing	−5.0	

=== Rockhampton ===
1944 Queensland state election: Rockhampton
Party	Candidate	Votes	%	±%
Labor	James Larcombe	6,361	65.5	−7.4
Country	Jack O'Shanesey	3,345	34.5	+34.5
Total formal votes		9,706	97.6	+1.7
Informal votes		236	2.4	−1.7
Turnout		9,942	86.5	−1.9
Labor hold		Swing	N/A	

=== Sandgate ===
1944 Queensland state election: Sandgate
Party	Candidate	Votes	%	±%
People's Party	Eric Decker	6,613	59.5	+35.6
Labor	Erle Wettemeyer	4,501	40.5	+1.8
Total formal votes		11,114	98.7	+0.9
Informal votes		141	1.3	−0.9
Turnout		11,255	90.2	−2.9
People's Party gain from Country		Swing	N/A	

=== South Brisbane ===
1944 Queensland state election: South Brisbane
Party	Candidate	Votes	%	±%
Labor	Vince Gair	5,940	56.3	−0.4
People's Party	Robert Lincoln	4,611	43.7	+0.4
Total formal votes		10,551	97.6	+0.1
Informal votes		263	2.4	−0.1
Turnout		10,814	82.8	−5.4
Labor hold		Swing	−0.4	

=== Stanley ===
1944 Queensland state election: Stanley
Party	Candidate	Votes	%	±%
Country	Duncan MacDonald	5,247	64.2	+4.5
Labor	Arthur Lee	2,924	35.8	−4.5
Total formal votes		8,171	99.2	+0.1
Informal votes		66	0.8	−0.1
Turnout		8,237	91.2	−1.1
Country hold		Swing	+4.5	

=== The Tableland ===
1944 Queensland state election: The Tableland
Party	Candidate	Votes	%	±%
Labor	Harry Bruce	3,447	47.0	−11.5
People's Party	Percy Kidd	1,923	26.2	+26.2
Communist	Frank Falls	1,706	23.3	+14.3
Independent	Jim Burton	255	3.5	+3.5
Total formal votes		7,331	98.3	−0.5
Informal votes		124	1.7	+0.5
Turnout		7,455	83.4	−3.9
Labor hold		Swing	0.0	

=== Toowong ===
1944 Queensland state election: Toowong
Party	Candidate	Votes	%	±%
People's Party	Charles Wanstall	6,047	56.6	−7.2
Independent	Tom Laws	2,437	22.3	+22.3
Independent	Harry Massey	1,881	17.6	+17.6
All Services Association	Harold Jiear	325	3.0	+3.0
Total formal votes		10,690	98.5	+0.1
Informal votes		166	1.5	−0.1
Turnout		10,856	91.1	−2.0
People's Party hold		Swing	N/A	

=== Toowoomba ===
1944 Queensland state election: Toowoomba
Party	Candidate	Votes	%	±%
Labor	Jack Duggan	unopposed		
Labor hold		Swing		

=== Townsville ===
1944 Queensland state election: Townsville
Party	Candidate	Votes	%	±%
Labor	George Keyatta	5,583	62.9	−37.1
Hermit Park Labor	Ernest O'Brien	1,863	21.0	+21.0
People's Party	Athena Deane	1,425	16.1	+16.1
Total formal votes		8,871	98.5	
Informal votes		132	1.5	
Turnout		9,003	81.8	
Labor hold		Swing	N/A	

=== Warrego ===
1944 Queensland state election: Warrego
Party	Candidate	Votes	%	±%
Labor	Harry O'Shea	4,107	69.6	−30.4
Country	William Addison	1,797	30.4	+30.4
Total formal votes		5,904	97.4	
Informal votes		157	2.6	
Turnout		6,061	81.5	
Labor hold		Swing	N/A	

=== Warwick ===
1944 Queensland state election: Warwick
Party	Candidate	Votes	%	±%
Labor	John Healy	4,656	54.4	−0.6
People's Party	Richard Matthews	3,901	45.6	+0.6
Total formal votes		8,557	96.7	−2.4
Informal votes		296	3.3	+2.4
Turnout		8,853	90.2	−1.1
Labor hold		Swing	−0.6	

=== West Moreton ===
1944 Queensland state election: West Moreton
Party	Candidate	Votes	%	±%
Country	Ted Maher	6,120	74.6	+9.2
Labor	John Dalton	2,082	25.4	−9.2
Total formal votes		8,202	99.3	0.0
Informal votes		59	0.7	0.0
Turnout		8,261	91.3	−2.4
Country hold		Swing	+9.2	

=== Wide Bay ===
1944 Queensland state election: Wide Bay
Party	Candidate	Votes	%	±%
Country	Harry Clayton	4,780	57.1	+0.3
Labor	Tom Thorpe	3,586	42.9	−0.3
Total formal votes		8,366	98.4	−0.1
Informal votes		140	1.6	+0.1
Turnout		8,506	87.6	−4.8
Country hold		Swing	+0.3	

=== Windsor ===
1944 Queensland state election: Windsor
Party	Candidate	Votes	%	±%
People's Party	Bruce Pie	5,353	51.2	+37.3
Labor	William Hoy	4,266	40.8	−3.8
Independent Democrat	Harry Moorhouse	833	8.0	-33.5
Total formal votes		10,452	99.0	+0.4
Informal votes		106	1.0	−0.4
Turnout		10,558	89.9	−2.9
People's Party gain from Independent Democrat		Swing	N/A	

=== Wynnum ===
1944 Queensland state election: Wynnum
Party	Candidate	Votes	%	±%
Labor	Bill Gunn	4,457	36.6	−3.9
People's Party	William Kempson	3,333	27.3	−23.9
Independent	Bill Dart	2,549	20.9	+20.9
Communist	Joseph Bailes	1,846	15.2	+6.8
Total formal votes		12,185	98.8	+0.8
Informal votes		148	1.2	−0.8
Turnout		12,333	91.7	+0.2
Labor gain from People's Party		Swing	+13.0	

== See also ==
- 1944 Queensland state election
- Candidates of the Queensland state election, 1944
- Members of the Queensland Legislative Assembly, 1944-1947
