= Candidates of the 1944 Queensland state election =

The 1944 Queensland state election was held on 15 April 1944.

== By-elections ==
- On 30 August 1941, Harry O'Shea (Labor) was elected to succeed Randolph Bedford (Labor), who had died on 7 July 1941, as the member for Warrego.
- On 31 October 1942, Lou Barnes (Independent Labor) was elected to succeed John O'Keefe (Labor), who had died on 27 January 1942, as the member for Cairns.
- On 20 March 1943, Fred Graham (Labor) was elected to succeed William Forgan Smith (Labor), who had resigned on 9 December 1942, as the member for Mackay.
- On 17 April 1943, Tom Kerr (United Australia) was elected to succeed Thomas Nimmo (United Australia), who had died on 6 February 1943, as the member for Oxley.
- On 1 May 1943, Ned Davis (Labor) was elected to succeed Frank Bulcock (Labor), who had resigned on 15 December 1942, as the member for Barcoo.
- On 9 October 1943, John Chandler (Queensland People's Party) was elected to succeed Bruce Pie (Independent Democrat), who had resigned on 30 June 1943, as the member for Hamilton.

== Retiring Members ==
- Note: Independent Country MLA William Deacon (Cunningham) died before the election; no by-election was held.

=== Labor ===
- Charles Conroy MLA (Maranoa)
- John Dash MLA (Mundingburra)

=== Country ===
- David Daniel MLA (Keppel)

== Candidates ==
Sitting members at the time of the election are shown in bold text.

Electorate	Held by	Labor candidate	Coalition candidate	Other candidates
Albert	Country	John Rosser	**Tom Plunkett** (CP)	Edward Coghlan (Ind CP)
Aubigny	Country	William Harth	**Jim Sparkes** (CP)	
Barcoo	Labor	**Ned Davis**		
Baroona	Labor	**Bill Power**	Richard Cooper (QPP)	
Bowen	Labor	**Ernest Riordan**	Bill Hancock (CP)	Fred Paterson (CPA)
Bremer	Labor	**Frank Cooper**		
Brisbane	Labor	**Johnno Mann**	George Regan (QPP)	
Bulimba	Labor	Bob Gardner	Geoffrey Ward (QPP)	**George Marriott** (Ind Lab)
Bundaberg	Frank Barnes Labor	Bernard McLean	Tom McCracken (QPP)	**Frank Barnes*** (FBLP); Arthur Howe (Ind Lab); Alfred Maughan (Ind)
Buranda	Labor	**Ted Hanson**	Robert Roberts (QPP)	
Cairns	Frank Barnes Labor	Daniel Crowley		**Lou Barnes** (FBLP)
Carnarvon	Labor	**Paul Hilton**	Harold Phillips (CP)	
Carpentaria	Labor	**Norm Smith**		James Boyd (Ind Lab); John Carson (Ind); Bernard McInerney (Ind)
Charters Towers	Labor	**Arthur Jones**		Syd Williams (Ind Lab)
Cook	Labor	**Harold Collins**	Norman Fitchett (QPP)	Jack Meehan (Ind Lab)
Cooroora	Country	Robert Spencer	**Harry Walker** (CP)	
Cunningham	Independent Country	John Hilton	Malcolm McIntyre (CP)	
Dalby	Labor	**Aubrey Slessar**	Charles Russell (CP)	
East Toowoomba	Country	Jim Thorpe	**Herbert Yeates** (CP)	K N Kunkel (Ind)
Enoggera	Labor	James Fraser	Kenneth Morris (QPP)	**George Taylor** (Ind Lab)
Fassifern	Country	Roy Richards	**Alf Muller** (CP)	Cyril Brosnan (Ind); George Masen (Ind)
Fitzroy	Labor	**Jim Clark**	Harry Weir (QPP)	
Fortitude Valley	Labor	**Samuel Brassington**	Annie Tipper (QPP)	
Gregory	Labor	**George Devries**		
Gympie	Labor	**Thomas Dunstan**	Niels Damm (QPP)	William Ebrington (Ind)
Hamilton	People's Party	John Dixon	**John Chandler** (QPP)	
Herbert	Labor	**Stephen Theodore**		Les Sullivan (CPA)
Ipswich	Labor	**David Gledson**		
Isis	Country	Frank Eastaughffe	**William Brand** (CP)	
Ithaca	Labor	**Ned Hanlon**	Reg Groom (QPP)	Jack McCallum (Ind)
Kelvin Grove	Labor	**Bert Turner**	Andrew Muir (QPP)	
Kennedy	Labor	**Cecil Jesson**	Aubrey Jurd (QPP)	John Clubley (CPA)
Keppel	Country	Walter Ingram	Frank Saunders (CP)	John Harding (Ind)
Kurilpa	Labor	**Kerry Copley**	Norman Brandon (QPP)	
Logan	Labor	**John Brown**	Thomas Hiley (QPP)	
Mackay	Labor	**Fred Graham**	Ernie Evans (QPP)	
Maranoa	Labor	John Taylor	Henry Crothers (CP)	
Maree	People's Party	Jack McNulty		**Louis Luckins** (Ind)
Maryborough	Labor	**David Farrell**		
Merthyr	Labor	**Bill Moore**	Leonard King (QPP)	
Mirani	Labor	**Ted Walsh**	Anthony Coyne (CP)	John Mulherin (Ind)
Mundingburra	Labor	Lionel Tomlins	Harry Pass (QPP)	Tom Aikens* (HPLP); Arthur Coburn (Ind); Lionel Parsons (Ind Lab)
Murrumba	Country		**Frank Nicklin** (CP)	
Nanango	Country	Daniel Carroll	**Jim Edwards** (CP)	George Anderson (Ind)
Normanby	Labor	**Tom Foley**	George Hamilton (CP)	
Nundah	Labor	**John Hayes**	William Cunningham (QPP)	
Oxley	People's Party	Felix Dittmer	**Tom Kerr** (QPP)	
Port Curtis	Labor	**Tommy Williams**	Samuel Halpin (CP)	
Rockhampton	Labor	**James Larcombe**	Jack O'Shanesey (CP)	
Sandgate	Country	Erle Wettemeyer	**Eric Decker** (QPP)	
South Brisbane	Labor	**Vince Gair**	Robert Lincoln (QPP)	
Stanley	Country	Arthur Lee	**Duncan MacDonald** (CP)	
The Tableland	Labor	**Harry Bruce**	Percy Kidd (QPP)	Jim Burton (Ind); Frank Falls (CPA)
Toowong	People's Party		Charles Wanstall (QPP)	Harold Jiear (Ind); Tom Laws (Ind); **Harry Massey** (Ind)
Toowoomba	Labor	**Jack Duggan**		
Townsville	Labor	**George Keyatta**	Athena Deane (QPP)	Ernest O'Brien (HPLP)
Warrego	Labor	**Harry O'Shea**	William Addison (CP)	
Warwick	Labor	**John Healy**	Richard Matthews (QPP)	
West Moreton	Country	John Dalton	**Ted Maher** (CP)	
Wide Bay	Country	Tom Thorpe	**Harry Clayton** (CP)	
Windsor	Independent	William Hoy	Bruce Pie (QPP)	**Harry Moorhouse** (Ind)
Wynnum	People's Party	Bill Gunn	William Kempson (QPP)	Joseph Bailes (CPA); **Bill Dart** (Ind)

== See also ==
- 1944 Queensland state election
- Members of the Queensland Legislative Assembly, 1941–1944
- Members of the Queensland Legislative Assembly, 1944–1947
- List of political parties in Australia
