= Members of the Queensland Legislative Assembly, 1941–1944 =

This is a list of members of the 29th Legislative Assembly of Queensland from 1941 to 1944, as elected at the 1941 state election held on 29 March 1941.

Name	Party	Electorate	Term in office
Frank Barnes	Ind. Labor	Bundaberg	1941–1950
Lou Barnes^{[2]}	Ind. Labor	Cairns	1942–1947
Randolph Bedford^{[1]}	Labor	Warrego	1923–1941
William Brand	Country	Isis	1920–1950
Samuel Brassington	Labor	Fortitude Valley	1927–1932, 1933–1950
John Brown	Labor	Logan	1935–1944
Hon Harry Bruce	Labor	The Tableland	1923–1950
Hon Frank Bulcock^{[4]}	Labor	Barcoo	1919–1942
John Beals Chandler^{[6]}	Independent/QPP	Hamilton	1943–1947
Jim Clark	Labor	Fitzroy	1935–1960
Harry Clayton	Country	Wide Bay	1920–1946
Harold Collins	Labor	Cook	1935–1957
Charles Conroy	Labor	Maranoa	1920–1944
Hon Frank Cooper	Labor	Bremer	1915–1946
Kerry Copley	Labor	Kurilpa	1932–1949
David Daniel	Country	Keppel	1936–1944
Bill Dart	United Australia	Wynnum	1938–1944
John Dash	Labor	Mundingburra	1920–1944
Ned Davis^{[4]}	Labor	Barcoo	1943–1961
William Deacon^{[7]}	Ind. Country	Cunningham	1920–1943
Eric Decker	Country	Sandgate	1941–1953
George Devries	Labor	Gregory	1941–1957
Jack Duggan	Labor	Toowoomba	1935–1957, 1958–1969
Thomas Dunstan	Labor	Gympie	1915–1929, 1935–1953
Jim Edwards	Country	Nanango	1920–1947
David Farrell	Labor	Maryborough	1938–1953
Hon Tom Foley	Labor	Normanby	1919–1960
Hon Vince Gair	Labor	South Brisbane	1932–1960
Hon David Gledson	Labor	Ipswich	1915–1929, 1932–1949
Fred Graham^{[3]}	Labor	Mackay	1943–1969
Hon Ned Hanlon	Labor	Ithaca	1926–1952
Hon Ted Hanson	Labor	Buranda	1924–1947
John Hayes	Labor	Nundah	1932–1947
John Healy	Labor	Warwick	1935–1947
Paul Hilton	Labor	Carnarvon	1935–1963
Cecil Jesson	Labor	Kennedy	1935–1960
Hon Arthur Jones	Labor	Charters Towers	1929–1932, 1939–1960
Tom Kerr^{[5]}	United Australia	Oxley	1943–1956
George Keyatta	Labor	Townsville	1939–1960
Hon James Larcombe	Labor	Rockhampton	1912–1929, 1932–1956
Louis Luckins	United Australia	Maree	1941–1953
Duncan MacDonald	Country	Stanley	1938–1953
Ted Maher	Country	West Moreton	1929–1949
Harry Massey	United Australia	Toowong	1938–1944
Johnno Mann	Labor	Brisbane	1936–1969
George Marriott	Labor/Ind. Labor	Bulimba	1938–1950
Bill Moore	Labor	Merthyr	1940–1957
Harry Moorhouse	Ind. Democrat	Windsor	1941–1944
Alf Muller	Country	Fassifern	1935–1969
Frank Nicklin	Country	Murrumba	1932–1968
Thomas Nimmo^{[5]}	United Australia	Oxley	1929–1943
Hon John O'Keefe^{[2]}	Labor	Cairns	1926–1929, 1930–1942
Harry O'Shea^{[1]}	Labor	Warrego	1941–1950
Bruce Pie^{[6]}	Ind. Democrat	Hamilton	1941–1943, 1944–1951
Tom Plunkett	Country	Albert	1929–1957
Bill Power	Labor	Baroona	1935–1960
Ernest Riordan	Labor	Bowen	1936–1944, 1950–1954
Aubrey Slessar	Labor	Dalby	1938–1947
Norm Smith	Labor	Carpentaria	1941–1960
Hon William Forgan Smith^{[3]}	Labor	Mackay	1915–1942
Jim Sparkes	Country	Aubigny	1932–1935, 1941–1960
George Taylor	Labor/Ind. Labor	Enoggera	1932–1944
Stephen Theodore	Labor	Herbert	1940–1950
Bert Turner	Labor	Kelvin Grove	1941–1957
Harry Walker	Country	Cooroora	1907–1947
Hon Ted Walsh	Labor	Mirani	1935–1947, 1950–1969
Hon Tommy Williams	Labor	Port Curtis	1932–1947
Herbert Yeates	Country	East Toowoomba	1938–1945

^{1} On 7 July 1941, the Labor member for Warrego, Randolph Bedford, died. Labor candidate Harry O'Shea won the resulting by-election on 30 August 1941.
^{2} On 27 January 1942, the Labor member for Cairns and Secretary for Mines, John O'Keefe, died. Independent Labor candidate Lou Barnes, the brother of Frank Barnes, won the resulting by-election on 31 October 1942.
^{3} On 9 December 1942, the Labor member for Mackay and Premier of Queensland, William Forgan Smith, retired. Labor candidate Fred Graham won the resulting by-election on 20 March 1943.
^{4} On 15 December 1942, the Labor member for Barcoo and Secretary for Agriculture and Stock, Frank Bulcock, resigned to take up an appointment as Commonwealth Director-General of Agriculture. Labor candidate Ned Davis won the resulting by-election on 1 May 1943.
^{5} On 6 February 1943, the United Australia member for Oxley, Thomas Nimmo, died. United Australia candidate Tom Kerr won the resulting by-election on 17 April 1943.
^{6} On 30 June 1943, the Independent Democrat member for Hamilton, Bruce Pie, resigned to contest Division of Brisbane at the 1943 federal election. Lord Mayor of Brisbane and Independent candidate John Beals Chandler won the resulting by-election on 9 October 1943. He soon formed the Queensland People's Party.
^{7} On 25 December 1943, the Independent Country member for Cunningham, William Deacon, died. No by-election was held due to the proximity of the 1944 state election.

== See also ==
- 1941 Queensland state election
- Forgan Smith Ministry (Labor) (1932–1942)
- Cooper Ministry (Labor) (1942–1946)

== Bibliography ==
- Waterson, D.B. Biographical register of the Queensland Parliament, 1930-1980 Canberra: ANU Press (1982)
- Hughes, Colin A.; Graham, B. D. (1976). Voting for the Queensland Legislative Assembly, 1890-1964. Canberra: Australian National University. ISBN 0-7081-0301-4.
