= Electoral results for the district of Hamilton (Queensland) =

Queensland state electoral result

This is a list of electoral results for the electoral district of Hamilton in Queensland state elections.

== Members for Hamilton ==
Member	Party	Term
Hugh Russell	CPNP	1932–1936
Hugh Russell	United Australia	1936–1941
Bruce Pie	Independent Democrat	1941–1943
Sir John Beals Chandler	QPP	1943–1947
Harold Taylor	QPP	1947–1948
Harold Taylor	Liberal	1948–1950

== Election results ==
=== Elections in the 1940s ===
1947 Queensland state election: Hamilton
Party	Candidate	Votes	%	±%
People's Party	Harold Taylor	8,370	73.7	−1.5
Labor	Vic Bartlett	2,981	26.3	+1.5
Total formal votes		11,351	98.8	0.0
Informal votes		134	1.2	0.0
Turnout		11,485	91.9	+3.5
People's Party hold		Swing	−1.5	

1944 Queensland state election: Hamilton
Party	Candidate	Votes	%	±%
People's Party	John Chandler	7,916	75.2	+39.0
Labor	John Dixon	2,614	24.8	+24.8
Total formal votes		10,530	98.8	+0.8
Informal votes		125	1.2	−0.8
Turnout		10,655	88.4	−3.1
People's Party hold		Swing	N/A	

1943 Hamilton state by-election
Party	Candidate	Votes	%	±%
People's Party	John Chandler	5,069	54.7	+18.5
Country	Graham Hart	2,231	24.1	+24.1
Labor	Frank Roberts	1,967	21.2	+21.2
Total formal votes		9,267	99.3	+1.3
Informal votes		62	0.7	−1.3
Turnout		9,329		
People's Party gain from Independent		Swing	N/A	

1941 Queensland state election: Hamilton
Party	Candidate	Votes	%	±%
Independent	Bruce Pie	6,221	63.8	+63.8
United Australia	Hugh Russell	3,538	36.2	−32.5
Total formal votes		9,759	98.0	−0.7
Informal votes		194	2.0	+0.7
Turnout		9,953	91.5	−2.8
Independent gain from United Australia		Swing	N/A	

=== Elections in the 1930s ===
1938 Queensland state election: Hamilton
Party	Candidate	Votes	%	±%
United Australia	Hugh Russell	6,573	68.7	+2.9
Labor	William Pinder	3,001	31.3	−2.9
Total formal votes		9,574	98.7	+0.2
Informal votes		129	1.3	−0.2
Turnout		9,703	94.3	+4.3
United Australia hold		Swing	+2.9	

1935 Queensland state election: Hamilton
Party	Candidate	Votes	%	±%
CPNP	Hugh Russell	5,647	65.8	
Labor	John Moir	2,936	34.2	
Total formal votes		8,583	98.5	
Informal votes		134	1.5	
Turnout		8,717	90.0	
CPNP hold		Swing		

1932 Queensland state election: Hamilton
Party	Candidate	Votes	%	±%
CPNP	Hugh Russell	5,202	58.9	
Labor	Alfred Jones	3,533	40.0	
Queensland Party	James Trotter	100	1.1	
Total formal votes		8,835	99.1	
Informal votes		76	0.9	
Turnout		8,911	87.5	
CPNP hold		Swing		

- Preferences were not distributed.
