= Electoral district of Hamilton =

Electoral district of Hamilton may refer to:

- Hamilton (UK Parliament constituency), a former electorate of the UK House of Commons
- Hamilton and Clyde Valley (UK Parliament constituency), an electorate of the UK House of Commons
- Electoral district of Hamilton (New South Wales), a former electorate of the New South Wales Legislative Assembly
- Electoral district of Hamilton (Queensland), a former electorate of the Queensland Legislative Assembly
