= Michael Gannon residence =

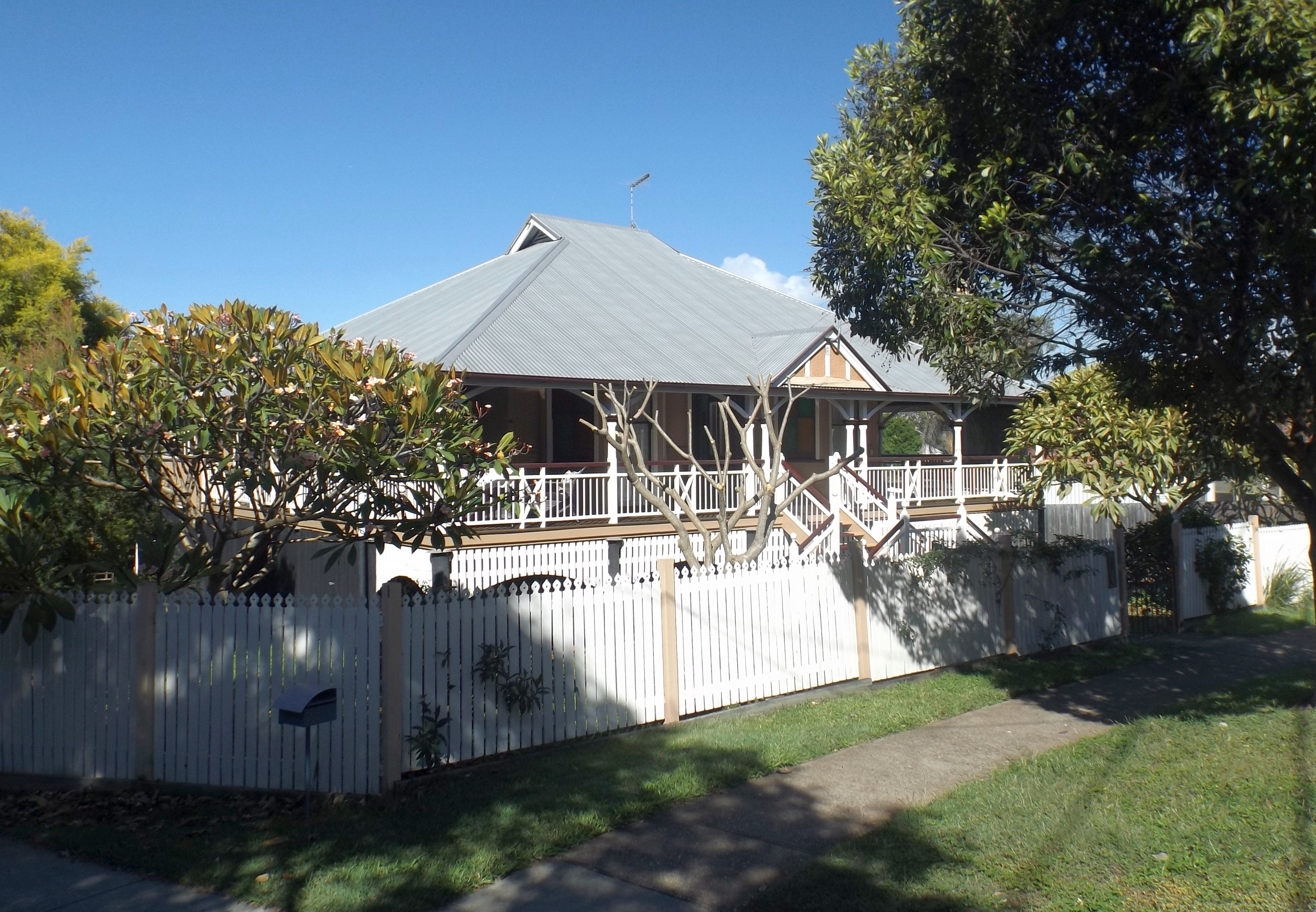
- Residence in 2015

- Location within Queensland Location within Australia
- 27.4522°S 153.1845°E
- Location: 150 Kingsley Terrace, Manly, City of Brisbane, Queensland, Australia

History
- Design period: 1870s - 1890s (late 19th century)
- Built: c. 1888

Queensland Heritage Register
- Official name: Residence, 150 Kingsley Terrace (c1888), Michael Gannon Residence
- Type: state heritage (landscape, built)
- Designated: 27 October 2000
- Reference no.: 601904
- Significant period: 1880s (fabric), 1880s-1890s (historical)
- Significant components: billiards room, furniture/fittings, toilet block/earth closet/water closet, trees/plantings, kitchen/kitchen house, residential accommodation - main house

The Michael Gannon residence is a heritage-listed holiday home at 150 Kingsley Terrace, Manly, City of Brisbane, Queensland, Australia. It was built c. 1888. It was added to the Queensland Heritage Register on 27 October 2000.

== History ==
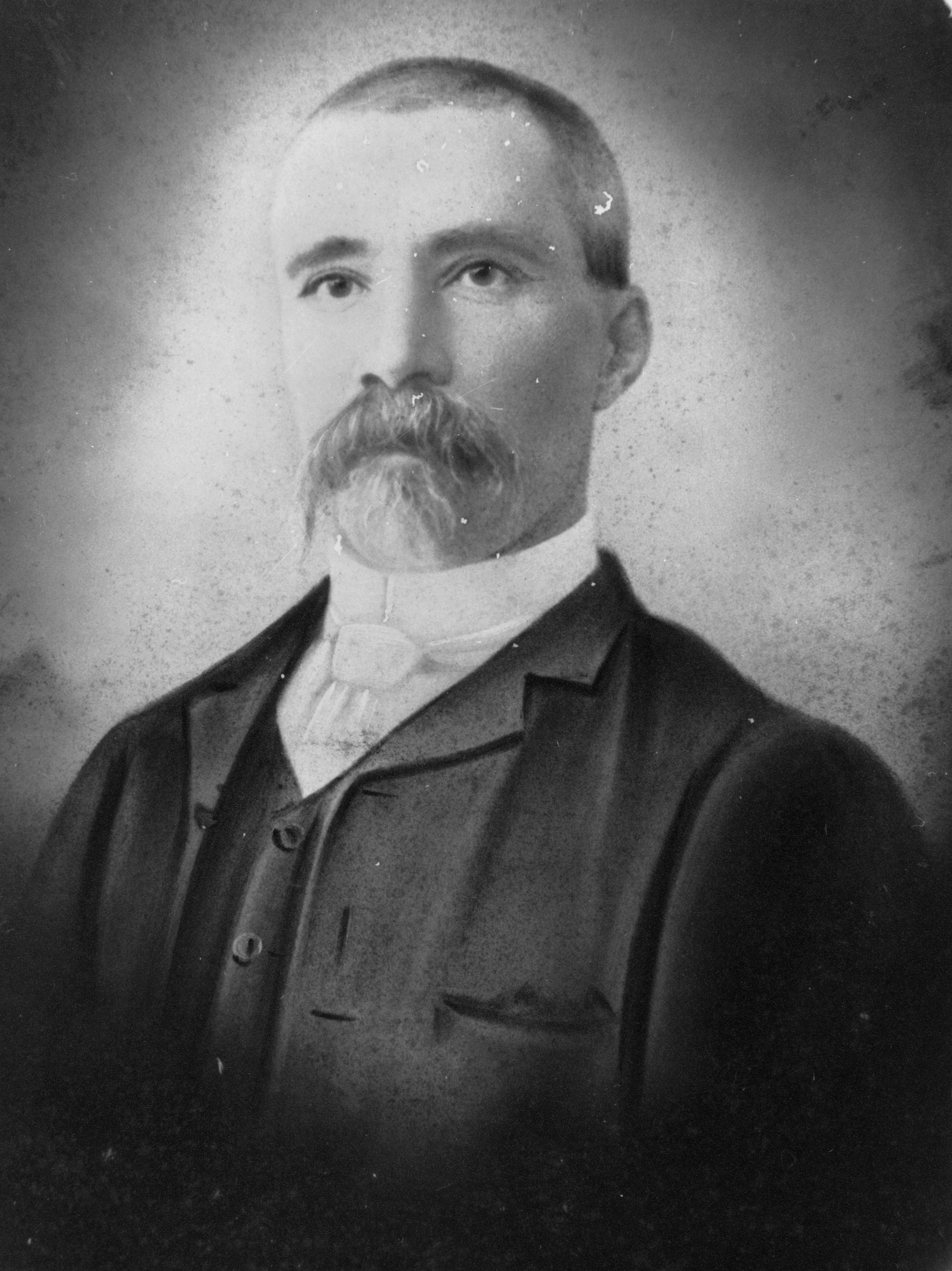
Michael Brennan Gannon

The residence, 150 Kingsley Terrace, Manly was constructed c. 1888 for Michael Gannon and his wife Amy.

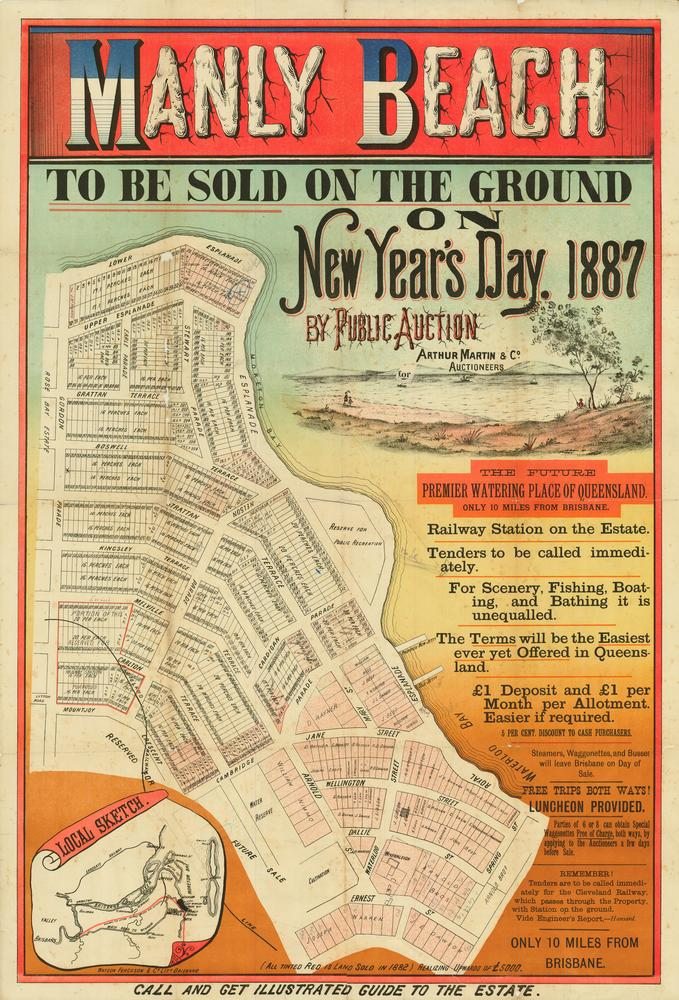
Estate map for Manly Beach, includes Kingsley Terrace, 1887

The first European settlement of the Wynnum-Manly area of Moreton Bay occurred in the 1860s when two sugar mills, Lota and Wyvernleigh were established. The area soon became popular with holiday makers, and holiday homes were constructed along the bay. In 1882 land sales of the Manly Beach Estate (named after the coastal Sydney suburb of Manly) were held, giving the area its present name. The completion of the railway in 1889 provided further impetus for the development of the area as a seaside resort especially as Wynnum and Manly were the only bayside stations opened with the Cleveland railway line on 1 November 1889.

In February 1888, Michael Brennan Gannon, Member of the Queensland Legislative Assembly for Toombul, Government Auctioneer and valuator (owner of Arthur Martin & Co), purchased a large portion of land in the Wynnum-Manly area formerly part of Portion 57. Gannon sold off a considerable acreage of land, but retained ownership of that portion on which the residence was to be constructed.

It is likely that the house was constructed c. 1888 as, on 30 April of that year; a Bill of Mortgage was registered from Michael Brennan Gannon to the Royal Bank of Queensland. The release for the mortgage was signed in September 1889. The house became the family's holiday home. The Gannon's permanent residence was at "Waratah", Toorak Road, Breakfast Creek. Gannon's private residence (1885) as well as a villa at Hawthorne (1887–88) were designed by architects John Hall and Son. While the architect of the residence at Manly is not known, given Gannon's prior history with the firm, it is possible that John Hall and Son were the architects for the residence at Manly.

Besides his political endeavours, Gannon was actively involved in Brisbane's social and sporting society. In 1888, Gannon was Vice-President of the Albert Cricket Club, under President Queensland Governor Anthony Musgrave. He was involved with the Queensland Rifle Association; the Brisbane Bicycling Club; the Breakfast Creek Rowing Club; and as Director of the Federal Building. He was also involved with Land Investors Society Pty Ltd and Deposit Bank and worked as a Justice of the Peace.

During the early 1890s Gannon's speculative ventures began to fail. The Land Bank of Queensland was in possession of the land by the early 1890s and sold off smaller allotments from the block. Gannon was eventually declared bankrupt in 1895 with liabilities in excess of £97,000. He died in April 1898, aged 48 years. At the time of his death, his widow's place of residence was listed as "Manly".

Later owners continued to use the house as a seaside home. Over the years various portions of the remainder of the estate were sold. In 1927 Thomas and Elizabeth Goodman purchased the property and, for the first time, the house was used as a principal place of residence. The Goodmans remained there until the death of Elizabeth in 1953.

The property was vacant until 1955 when the public trustee sold it to an investor who had the house converted into three flats. The house remained as flats until June 1999 when the property was purchased by the current owners. The residence has been identified as a character building in the Wynnum-Manly Local Area Plan.

== Description ==
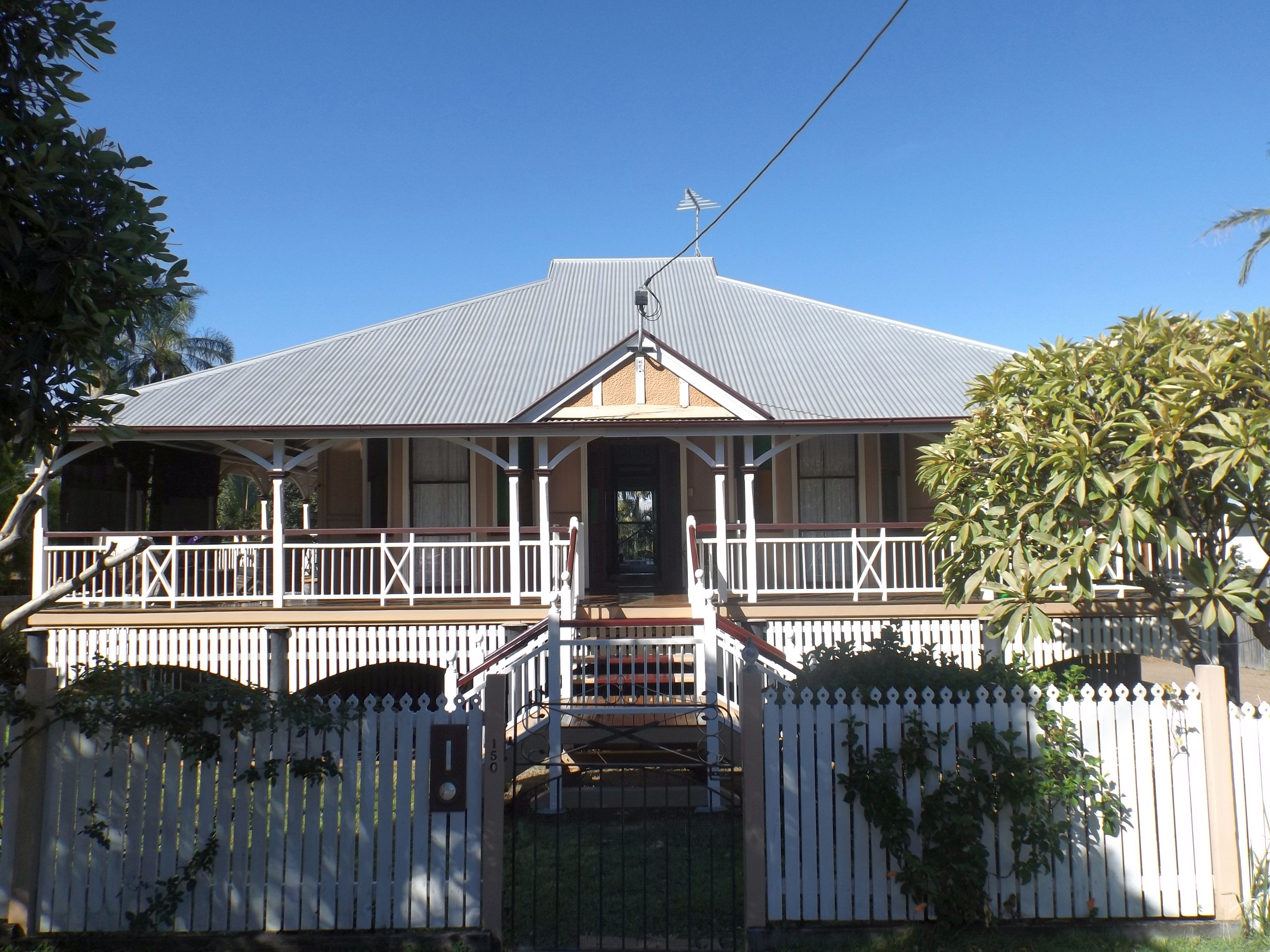
Front entrance, 2015

The residence located at 150 Kingsley Terrace is sited on three parcels of land that fall gently from the western street frontage toward the rear eastern boundary of the site. The residence is sited close to the street frontage of the property meaning the backyard is quite expansive. Vegetation to the site is quite minimal with only a few mature plantings contained to the boundaries of the site.

The residence itself is a two-storey structure of timber construction, elevated well above the ground on a combination of timber and concrete stumps, as well as sections of concrete block wall under the front western verandah. The house is clad with a combination of timber chamferboards to exposed external walls and VJ linings to external walls sheltered by verandahs. A central hip roof covers the core of the house as well as extending over the verandahs to the north, south and west. A separate skillion and hip roof cover the rear verandah and associated rear structure assumed to have once been the kitchen. All roof planes are sheeted with corrugated iron.

Enclosed verandahs surround the central core of the house. These enclosures are externally clad with asbestos cement sheeting and include a combination of louvred and awning sash windows. Recent renovation work has revealed that much of the original verandah structure remains intact, simply covered by more recent alterations and additions.

Entry to the house is via a central timber stair which leads to the verandah and original front door of the house which is surrounded by patterned coloured glass. Internally a central hall extends from the entry to the rear verandah. This hall is divided centrally by a doorway, creating a formal entry portion and informal rear. Flanking the entry hall is a main bedroom to the north and a formal dining room to the south. These rooms include central bay windows with floor to ceiling double hung windows. In the hallway and the dining room the ceilings are pressed metal reinforcing the formal nature of these entry spaces. Flanking the rear section of the hallway is the billiard room to the south and a store room and bedroom to the north. All rooms, with the exception of the store room, open onto the verandahs through French doors.

The enclosed rear verandah of the house is now used as the main living area. A kitchen is located at the northern end of this verandah and a bathroom is at the southern end. The structure adjoining the southern end of the verandah is thought to have once been the kitchen of the house but is now used as a bedroom. Evidence exists within this room and at the ground level to indicate that a fireplace may have once serviced these spaces. More recent additions to the rear of the house include a laundry and deck adjoining the original kitchen and rear verandah.

Internally the original pine floors still exist within the core of the house while hardwood flooring lines the verandahs. The walls and ceilings are generally clad with timber tongue and groove boards and the timber joinery to the doors and windows and associated architraves is still intact. Much of the glass within the widows is original as is the door and window hardware, including turned wooden door handles. Other original elements that survive within the house are a claw foot bath and gas lighting pipes within the ceiling cavity.

The area under the house is generally enclosed with a combination of timber battens, asbestos cement sheeting and concrete block work. This area serves as a garage and storage area and includes the enclosure to the original earth closet.

== Heritage listing ==
The Michael Gannon residence (c1888) was listed on the Queensland Heritage Register on 27 October 2000 having satisfied the following criteria.

The place is important in demonstrating the evolution or pattern of Queensland's history.

Constructed c. 1888, the residence is significant in demonstrating the continued growth of the Wynnum/Manly area in the latter part of the 19th century. It is particularly significant for its association with the growth of Manly as a popular seaside resort following the extension of the railway line to the area in 1889.

The place demonstrates rare, uncommon or endangered aspects of Queensland's cultural heritage.

Substantial seaside houses still remaining on large areas of land are now uncommon, contributing to the significance of the place.

The place is important in demonstrating the principal characteristics of a particular class of cultural places.

As a substantial, two-storeyed timber building with wide verandahs, incorporating decorative timber balustrading and brackets, set on a large block of land with views towards Moreton Bay, the residence is significant as a good example of a late 19th century seaside house.

The place has a special association with the life or work of a particular person, group or organisation of importance in Queensland's history.

Constructed for Michael Brennan Gannon, Member of the Legislative Assembly for Toombul and Government Auctioneer and Valuator, the residence is significant for its association with this prominent Brisbane identity.
