= Trooper Cobb's Grave =

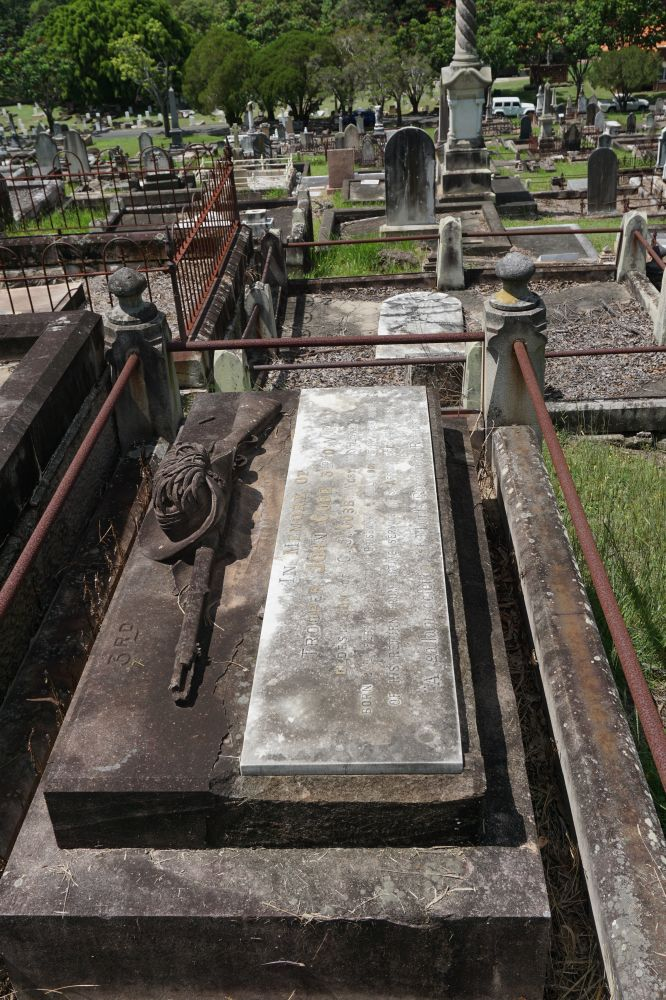
- Trooper Cobb's Grave from the west, 2016

- Location within Queensland Location within Australia
- 27.4744°S 152.9825°E
- Location: Corner Frederick Street and Mt Coot-tha Road, Toowong, City of Brisbane, Queensland, Australia

History
- Design period: 1900–1914 (early 20th century)
- Built: 1901

Site notes
- Architect: Andrew Lang Petrie

Queensland Heritage Register
- Official name: Trooper Cobb's Grave
- Type: state heritage (built)
- Designated: 21 October 1992
- Reference no.: 600333
- Significant period: 1901 (fabric, historical)
- Significant components: sarcophagus
- Builders: Andrew Lang Petrie

Trooper Cobb's Grave is a heritage-listed memorial at Corner Frederick Street & Mt Coot-tha Road, Toowong, City of Brisbane, Queensland, Australia. It was designed and built by Andrew Lang Petrie in 1901. It was added to the Queensland Heritage Register on 21 October 1992.

== History ==
This memorial was erected in 1901 in Toowong Cemetery, over the grave of Trooper John Cobb of the 3rd Queensland Mounted Infantry, who died in July 1901 a few days after returning to Australia from active service in the South African War. He was 44 years old.

Cobb had seen action at Elands River and Rhenoster Kop in South Africa. Like all Australian troops participating in the South African War (Boer War) of 1899–1902, Cobb was a volunteer.

His grave is the only known South African War soldier's grave in Queensland. The memorial was constructed by the prominent monumental mason Andrew Lang Petrie and erected by Cobb's relatives.

== Description ==
The gravestone is a sarcophagus of Helidon sandstone, 1.9 metres (6 ft 3 in) long and a metre wide.

On the top, carved in sandstone, are a rifle, hat with emu plume and badge, and a bandolier, the equipment of soldiers in the South African War. A marble plate also rests on the top, bearing an inscription in leaded letters.

The sarcophagus is enclosed by a substantial concrete wall with sandstone coping, pallstones and low iron railings. The grave had suffered from neglect but has been tidied recently. However, little of the inscription lettering survives.

== Heritage listing ==
Trooper Cobb's Grave was listed on the Queensland Heritage Register on 21 October 1992 having satisfied the following criteria.

The place is important in demonstrating the evolution or pattern of Queensland's history.

Trooper Cobb's Grave, Toowong is significant historically as the only known grave in Queensland of a mortally wounded South African War soldier. It is a rare Queensland South African War memorial, and a unique source of historical information.

The place demonstrates rare, uncommon or endangered aspects of Queensland's cultural heritage.

Trooper Cobb's Grave, Toowong is significant historically as the only known grave in Queensland of a mortally wounded South African War soldier. It is a rare Queensland South African War memorial, and a unique source of historical information.
