= Michael Gannon (politician) =

Australian politician

Michael Gannon JP
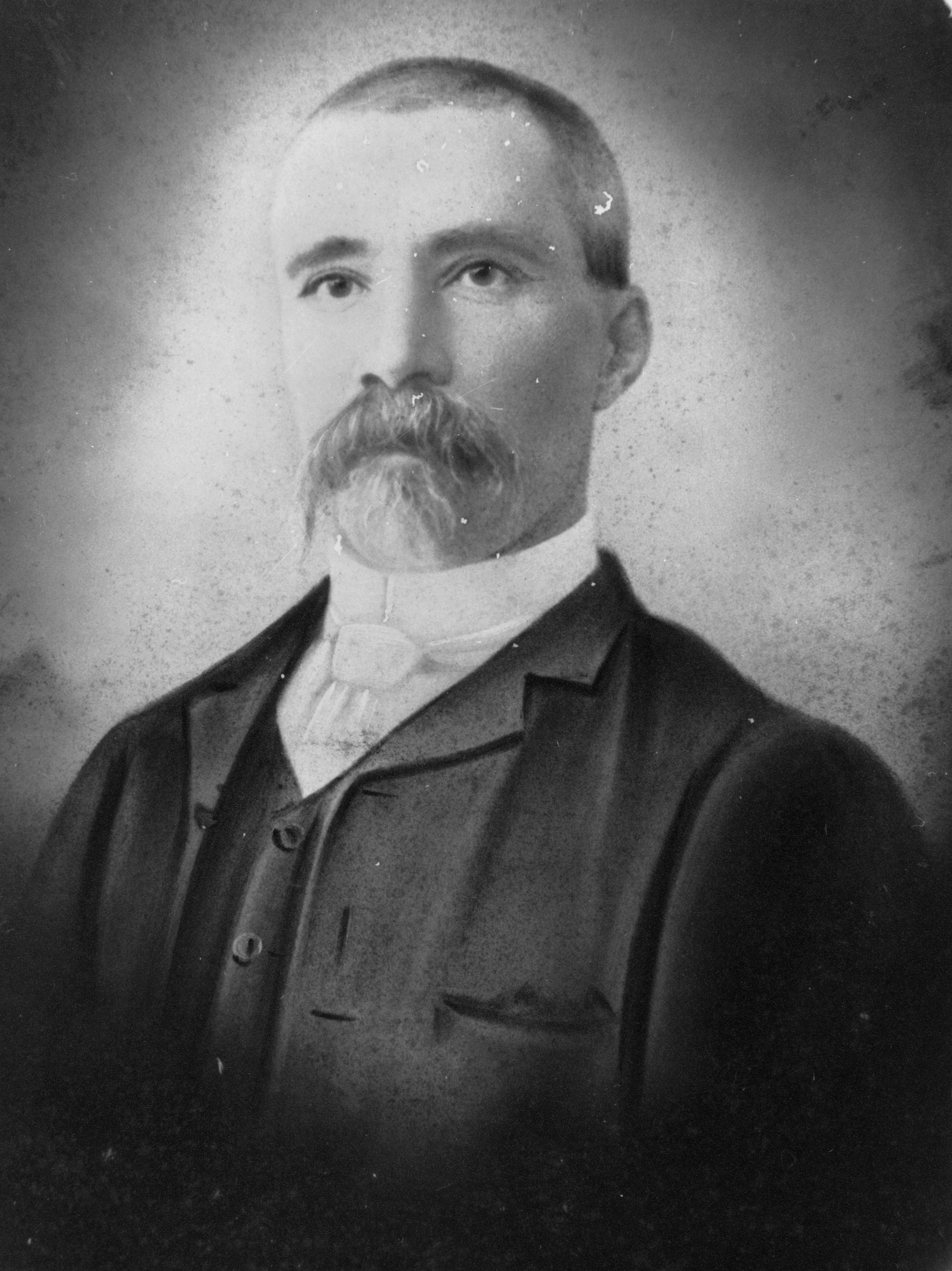

Member of the Queensland Legislative Assembly for Toombul
- In office 10 May 1888 – 29 April 1893
- Preceded by: New seat
- Succeeded by: Andrew Petrie

Personal details
- Born: Michael Brennan Gannon; 1847 Sydney, Australia
- Died: 10 April 1898 (aged 50–51) Brisbane, Queensland, Australia
- Resting place: Toowong Cemetery
- Spouse: Amy England Pearce
- Occupation: Auctioneer, businessman

Michael Brennan Gannon (1847—1898) was an auctioneer and politician in Queensland, Australia. He was a Member of the Queensland Legislative Assembly.

== Early life ==
Gannon was born in Sydney, New South Wales, in 1847, the son of James Gannon and his wife Mary (née Phelps). After working as a clerk at the Christian Brothers' College Sydney and as a commercial agent with his brother, he relocated to Queensland in 1868.

He acquired pastoral experience at Warra Warra and acted as manager for Thorn and a stockbuyer for Davenport. In 1880 he became an auctioneer in Ipswich. In partnership with R.A. Ryan, he purchased the produce and auctioneering company of Arthur Martin in 1882. He invested in grazing and real estate.

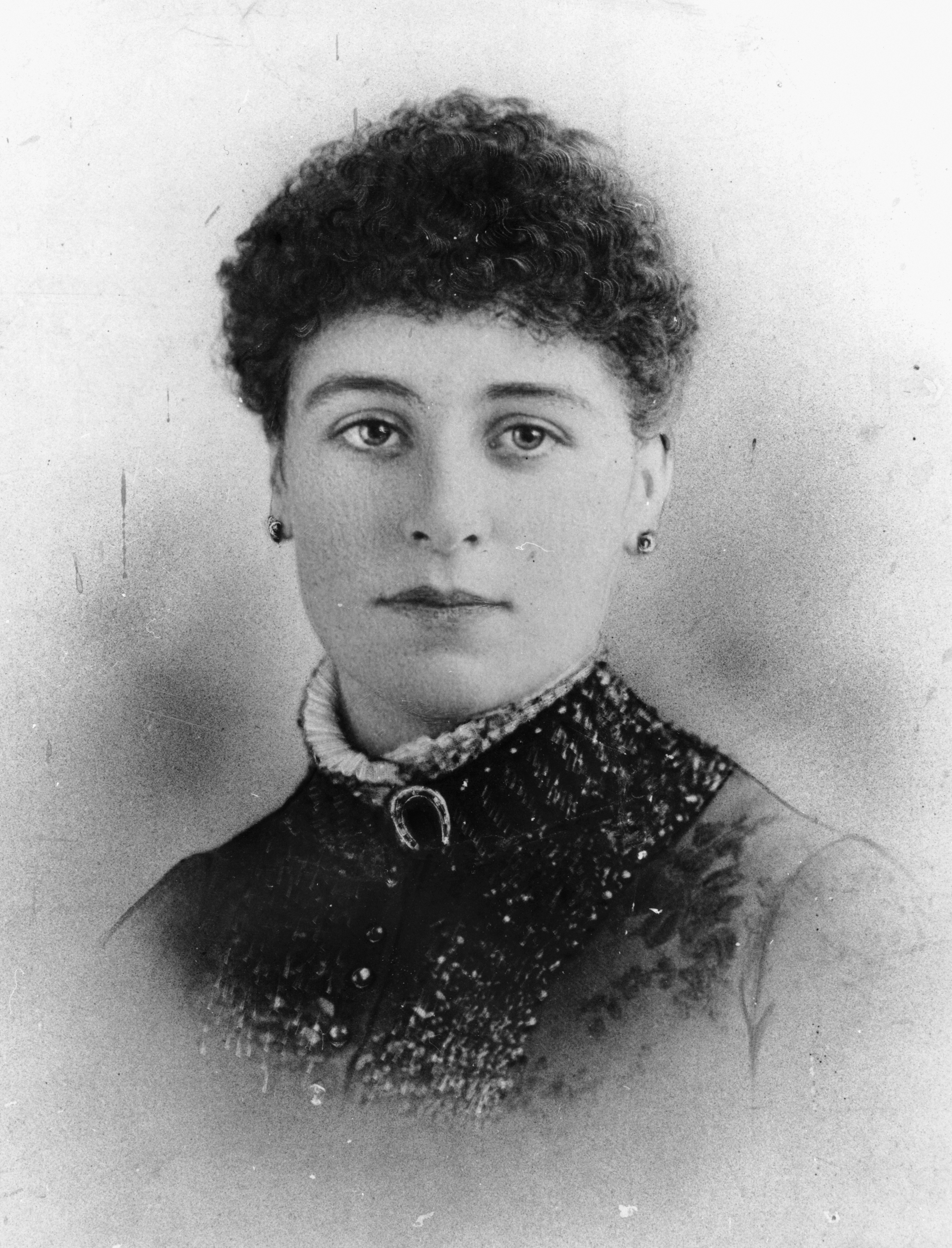
Amy England Gannon (née Pearce)

On 6 June 1884, he married Amy England Pearce in Brisbane.

== Politics ==
Gannon unsuccessfully contested the electoral district of Ipswich in the 1881 by-election triggered by the resignation of John Malbon Thompson, but was defeated by Josiah Francis, a former mayor of Ipswich.

Gannon was elected to the Queensland Legislative Assembly in the electoral district of Toombul on 10 May 1888 in the 1888 colonial election. He held the seat until 29 April 1893 when he was defeated by Andrew Lang Petrie in the 1893 election.

Gannon unsuccessfully contested the electoral district of Bulimba in the 1896 election, unable to defeat the sitting member James Dickson.

== Later life ==
The Gannon's permanent residence was at "Waratah", Toorak Road, Breakfast Creek.

In February 1888, Michael Gannon purchased a large portion of land in the Wynnum-Manly area formerly part of Portion 57. Gannon sold off a considerable acreage of land, but retained ownership of that portion on which a residence was to be constructed. It is likely that the house was constructed c. 1888 as, on 30 April of that year, a Bill of Mortgage was registered from Michael Brennan Gannon to the Royal Bank of Queensland. The release for the mortgage was signed in September 1889. The house became the family's holiday home.

Besides his political endeavours, Gannon was actively involved in Brisbane's social and sporting society. In 1888, Gannon was Vice-President of the Albert Cricket Club, Queensland Governor Anthony Musgrave was President; he was involved with the Queensland Rifle Association; the Brisbane Bicycling Club; the Breakfast Creek Rowing Club; a Director of the Federal Building, Land Investors Society Pty Ltd and Deposit Bank and a Justice of the Peace.

During the early 1890s Gannon's speculative ventures began to fail. The Land Bank of Queensland was in possession of the land by the early 1890s and sold off smaller allotments from the block. Gannon was eventually declared bankrupt in 1895 with liabilities in excess of £97,000.

Gannon died in Brisbane on 9 April 1898 aged 50 years after a protracted illness that had forced him to retire. He was buried in the Toowong Cemetery on 11 April 1898. His obituaries described him as "universally respected for his outspokenness and the honourable motives which actuated his conduct" and that he would be remembered as "one of the most honest figures in mercantile circles; ... a man who in turn was most happy when sharing his bounty with others less prosperous. Everybody respected him, everybody trusted him. In politics, too, he was known as the 'straight man' whose first consideration was others ...".

== Legacy ==
His holiday home, Michael Gannon residence, at Manly has been listed on the Queensland Heritage Register.

== See also ==
- Members of the Queensland Legislative Assembly, 1888–1893

Parliament of Queensland
New district	Member for Toombul; 1888–1893	Succeeded by Andrew Petrie
