= Andrew Lang Petrie =

Australian politician (1854–1928)

Andrew Petrie
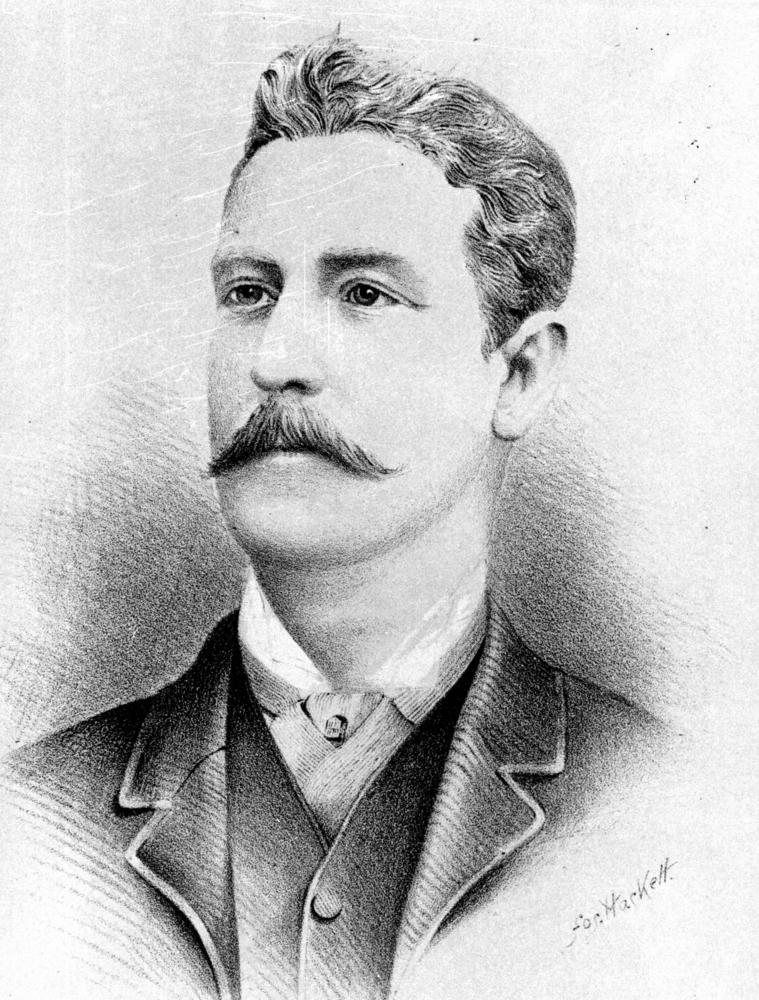
- Sketch of Andrew Lang Petrie

Member of the Queensland Legislative Assembly for Toombul
- In office 29 April 1893 – 8 May 1926
- Preceded by: Michael Gannon
- Succeeded by: Hugh Russell

Personal details
- Born: Andrew Lang Petrie; 25 June 1854 Brisbane, Colony of New South Wales
- Died: 1 April 1928 (aged 73) Brisbane, Queensland, Australia
- Resting place: Toowong Cemetery
- Party: Ministerialist
- Other political affiliations: Liberal Party, National, Queensland United Party
- Spouse: Margaret Aird (m.1877 d.1883) Eliza Anne Agnes Luya (m.1886)
- Occupation: Businessman

Andrew Lang Petrie (25 June 1854 – 1 April 1928) was a builder, stonemason and politician in Queensland, Australia. He was a Member of the Queensland Legislative Assembly.

== Personal life ==
Andrew Lang Petrie was born in Brisbane on 25 June 1854, the eldest son of John Petrie and Jane Keith McNaught.

He married Margaret Aird, the daughter of John Aird and Margaret Ballantine, in Brisbane on 4 January 1877. They had the following children:

- John George Petrie, born in Brisbane on 21 March 1879
- Margaret Jessie Petrie, born in Brisbane on 2 November 1883

His wife Margaret died in Brisbane on 9 November 1883 aged 30 years, probably from complications of childbirth, and is buried in Toowong Cemetery with other members of her Aird family.

On 14 April 1886 in Brisbane, he remarried, this time to Eliza Anne Agnes Luya (born 3 December 1862). They had the following children:

- Andrew Luya Petrie, born in Brisbane on 29 January 1887
- Eric Sandford Petrie, born in Brisbane on 21 August 1888
- Harold Petrie, born in Brisbane on 6 August 1889, died in Brisbane on 16 August 1889, buried Toowong Cemetery

Andrew Lang Petrie died at 52 George Street, Brisbane on 1 April 1928 aged 73 years and was buried in Toowong Cemetery with his son Harold.

His second wife Agnes died on 10 December 1942 aged 82 years and was cremated at the Mt Thompson Crematorium on 11 December 1942. On 6 May 1943 her ashes were interred with husband Andrew and son Harold in Toowong Cemetery.

== Business life ==
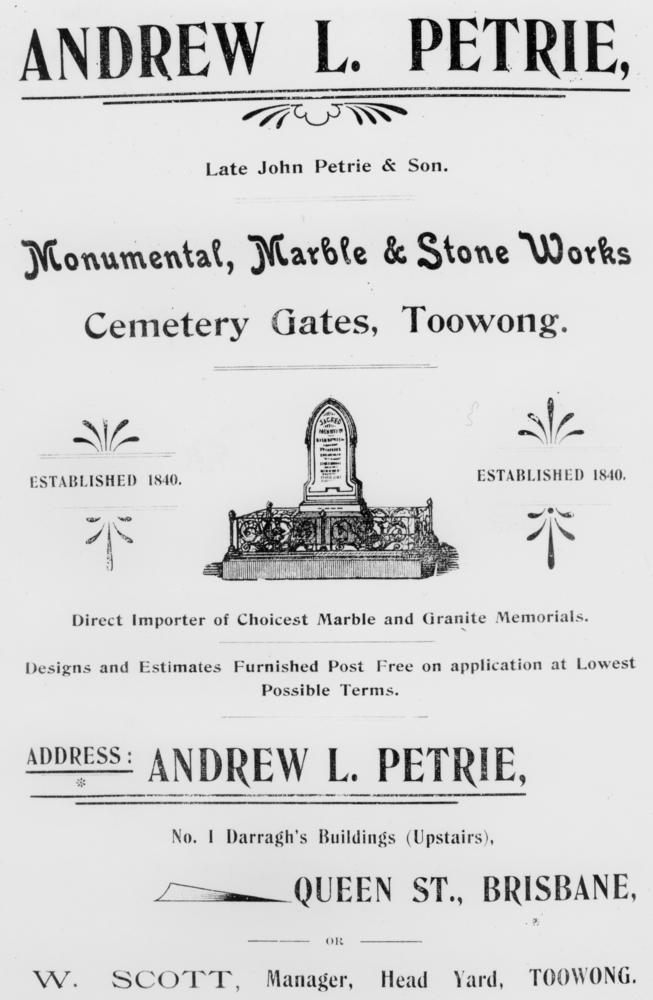
Advertisement for the manufacturer of stone memorials, Andrew L. Petrie

In 1882, Andrew Lang Petrie took over the management of the family Petrie™ business from his father John Petrie; the business was renamed 'John Petrie & Son'. At that time, the business included cabinet making and joinery, brick-making, Tile-making and monumental masonry. He relocated the business from its location on the corner of Queen Street and Wharf Street to a location alongside the gates of Toowong Cemetery (the site is occupied in 2009 by Mitsubishi Motors).

Due to the depression, the business experienced financial difficulties and insolvency proceedings commenced in early 1894, however, with his son and other members of the family, was able to continue undertaking construction and masonry work. The business continued but at a smaller scale and increasingly undertook monumental masonry projects in addition to other stonemasonry and building works.

== Public life ==
Andrew Lang Petrie was appointed to the Toombul Division Board in 1885 and was re-elected without opposition for a further three years. In that role he was instrumental in achieving the separation of the Hamilton Division from Toombul Division and was the first chairman of the Hamilton Divisional Board.

Andrew Lang Petrie was elected as representative of the Electoral district of Toombul to the Legislative Assembly of Queensland on 20 April 1893 in the 1893 state election. However, his insolvency proceedings in January 1894 forced him to resign the seat, effective 5 July 1893, triggering a by-election. However, he was able to negotiate an arrangement with his creditors and avoid bankruptcy in time to nominate for re-election at the by-election. He was successful in the by-election and then held the seat through many successive elections. In July 1925, he announced that he would retire at the 1926 election, thus completing his time on parliament on 8 May 1926 (aged 72 years).

During that time, he was affiliated with the following groups or political parties:

- Ministerialist
- Opposition
- Liberal Party (not to be confused with current Liberal Party)
- Nationalist
- Queensland United Party (Nationalist and Country Party)

== Works ==
- Trooper Cobb's Grave (1901)
- All five altars of the St Ignatius Church, Toowong were erected by Andrew Petrie and Sons, Stonemasons.
- Original Southport War Memorial
- Montville Hall gates

== See also ==
- Members of the Queensland Legislative Assembly

Parliament of Queensland
Preceded by Michael Gannon	Member for Toombul; 1893–1926	Succeeded by Hugh Russell
