= Electoral district of Toombul =

Toombul Queensland—Legislative Assembly
- State: Queensland
- Created: 1888
- Abolished: 1932
- Namesake: Toombul
- Demographic: Metropolitan
- Coordinates: 27°24′S 153°04′E

The electoral district of Toombul was a Legislative Assembly electorate in the state of Queensland, Australia.

== History ==
Toombul was created by the redistribution of 1887, taking effect at the 1888 colonial election, and existed until the 1932 state election. It was based on the north-east suburbs of Brisbane between Breakfast Creek and Kedron Brook from Newmarket and Alderley to Moreton Bay, formerly part of the electorate of Enoggera.

When Toombul was abolished in 1932, its area was incorporated into the districts of Hamilton and Nundah.

== Members ==
The following people were elected in the seat of Toombul:

Member	Party	Term
Michael Gannon	none	May 1888 – Apr 1893
Andrew Lang Petrie	Ministerial/ Liberal; National; CPNP	Apr 1893 – May 1926
Hugh Russell	CPNP	May 1926 – Jun 1932

Russell subsequently represented Hamilton (1932–1941).
