= Tom Rasey =

Australian politician

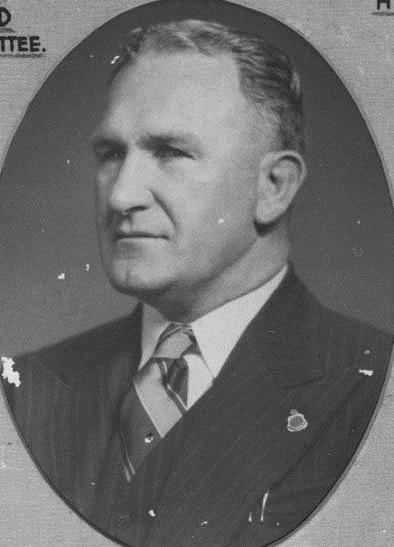

Member of the Queensland Legislative Assembly for Windsor
- In office 29 April 1950 – 26 April 1957
- Preceded by: Bruce Pie
- Succeeded by: Ray Smith

Personal details
- Born: Thomas William Rasey; 10 June 1898 Brisbane, Queensland, Australia
- Died: 27 April 1989 (aged 90) Caboolture, Queensland, Australia
- Resting place: Nudgee Cemetery
- Party: Labor
- Other political affiliations: Queensland Labor Party
- Spouse: Johanna Eileen Dunlea (m.1936 d.1987)
- Occupation: Drover, Clerk, Truck driver

Thomas William Rasey (10 June 1898 – 27 April 1989) was an Australian politician from Queensland. He was a Member of the Queensland Legislative Assembly.

== Early life ==
Thomas Rasey served with the Australian army during World War I (1914–1918) after enlisting in Brisbane in September 1916. Serving in the 42nd Battalion, 11th Brigade, 3rd Division as a signaler of D Company, Rasey became a casualty of gas attacks at Villers-Bretonneux, France, in June 1918. From the front, he was transferred to hospitals in France and England before being repatriated to Australia in March 1919.

An accomplished sportsman, Rasey played rugby league for Fortitude Valley Rugby League Club in Brisbane and became a well known figure in community and sports groups during the inter-war years. Despite working outside Brisbane as a cattleman, truck driver, and even on a merchant ship for sometime, he had a passion for his home city. He represented Brisbane twice as a footballer and served on Queensland National Fitness Council for 27 years. Actively involved in labour politics, Rasey was a member of the Transport Workers' Union of Queensland serving as both vice-president and President.

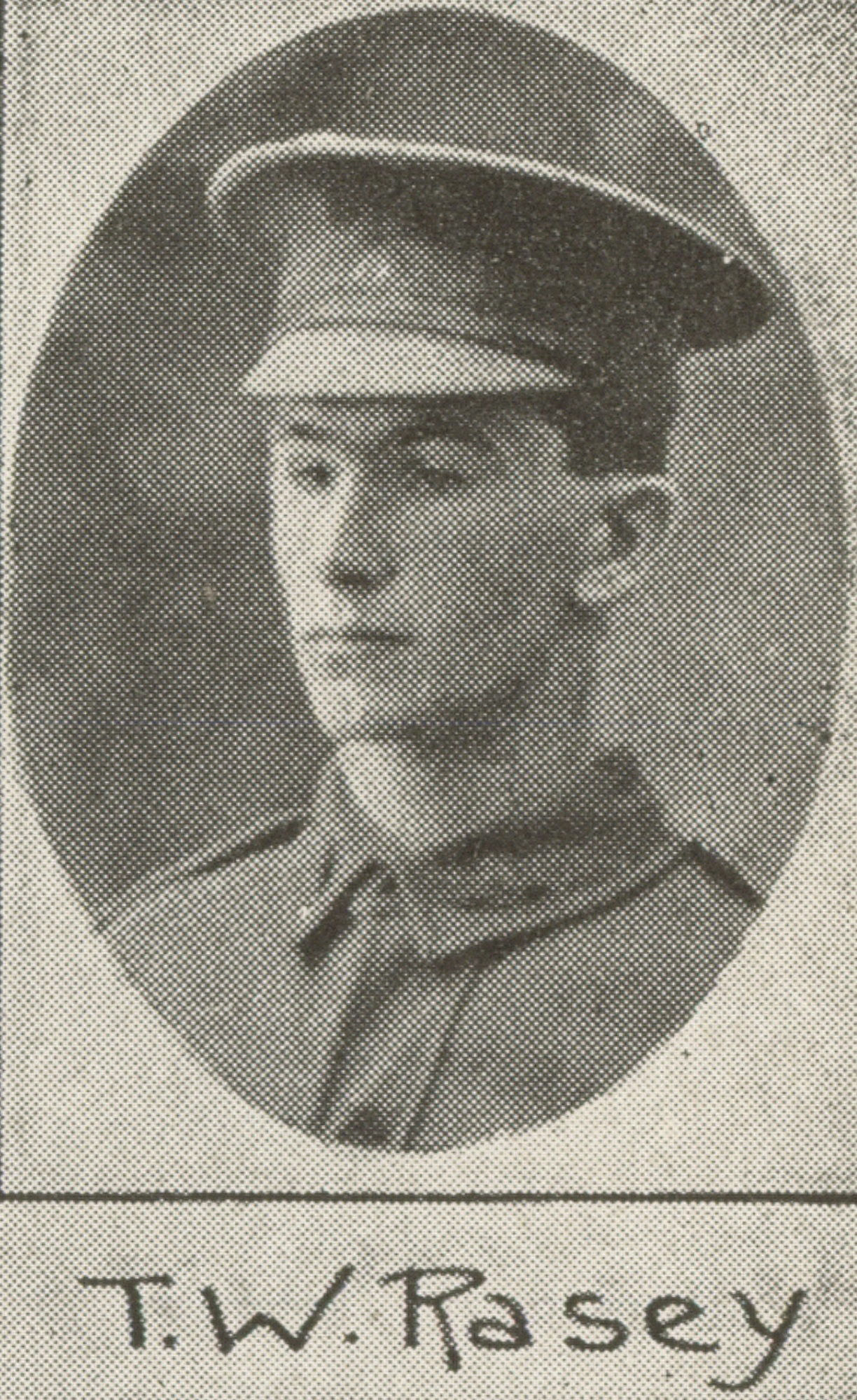
T.W. Rasey, The Queenslander, 1917

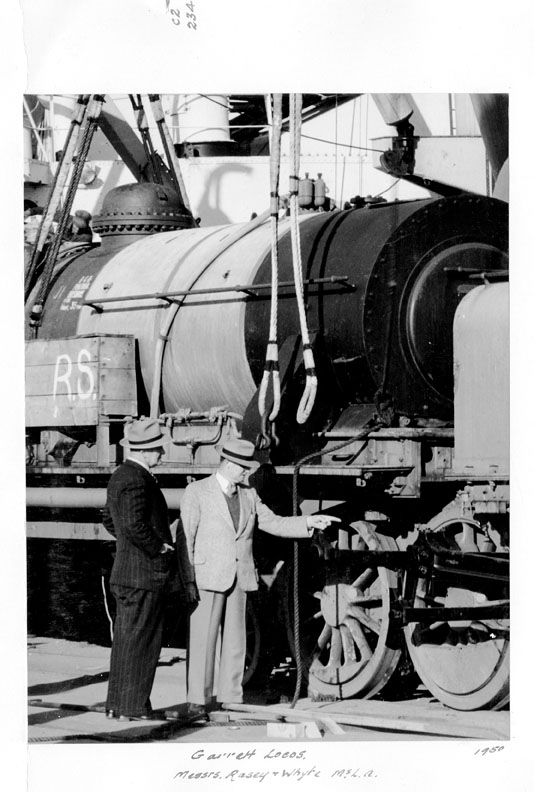
Tom Rasey and Paddy Whyte, MLAs, in front of a Garatt locomotive, 1950

== Politics ==
In 1943, Rasey was elected as an alderman on the Brisbane City Council. He was re-elected on two subsequent occasions (1946 and 1949) before make a transition to the state political sphere. As a member of the traditionalist arm of Labor trade union movement and as a committed Roman Catholic, Rasey was associated with the staunchly anti-communist "groupers" during the late 1940s. The so-called "groupers" were members of the ALP Industrial Groups Committee who were given "a blank cheque in determining how the (Labor Party's) crusade against communism would be fought" during the Cold War.

Rasey was elected as representative of Windsor in the Legislative Assembly of Queensland on 29 April 1950). He represented the Labor until 26 April 1957, when he joined the breakaway Queensland Labor Party. However, he then lost his seat in the next election, held on 3 August 1957.

== Later life ==
Rasey died in 1989 and is buried in Nudgee Cemetery.

Parliament of Queensland
Preceded by Bruce Pie	Member for Windsor; 1950–1957	Succeeded by Ray Smith
