= Herbert McPhail =

Australian politician

The Hon Herbert McPhail
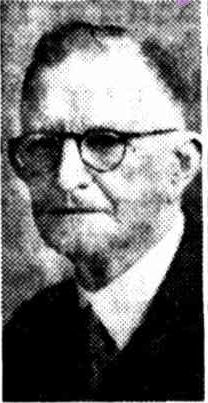
- Herbert George McPhail, 1940

Member of the Queensland Legislative Assembly for Windsor
- In office 22 May 1915 – 16 March 1918
- Preceded by: Hugh Macrossan
- Succeeded by: Charles Taylor

Member of the Queensland Legislative Council
- In office 19 February 1920 – 16 September 1920
- In office 12 November 1921 – 23 March 1922

Personal details
- Born: Herbert George McPhail; 11 February 1878 Brisbane, Queensland, Australia
- Died: 20 September 1951 (aged 73) Brisbane, Queensland, Australia
- Party: Labor
- Occupation: Business owner

Herbert George McPhail (11 February 1878 – 20 September 1951) was a member of both the Queensland Legislative Council and Queensland Legislative Assembly.

== Early life ==
McPhail was born at Brisbane, Queensland, to Robert McPhail and his wife Fanny (née Challenger) and was educated at Brisbane Normal School.

== Political career ==
McPhail entered politics at the 1915 state election, winning the seat of Windsor for the Labor and defeating the sitting member, Hugh Macrossan. He held the seat for one term before losing to Charles Taylor in 1918.

When the Labour Party starting forming governments in Queensland, it found much of its legislation being blocked by a hostile Council, where members had been appointed for life by successive conservative governments. After a failed referendum in May 1917, Premier Ryan tried a new tactic, and later that year advised the Governor, Sir Hamilton John Goold-Adams, to appoint thirteen new members whose allegiance lay with Labour to the council.

In 1920, the new Premier Ted Theodore appointed a further fourteen new members to the Council with McPhail amongst the appointees. He served for seven months before resigning in September 1920 only to be reappointed fourteen months later and remaining in the council until it was abolished in March 1922.

== Personal life ==
McPhail died in Brisbane in September 1951 and was cremated at Mount Thompson Crematorium.

Parliament of Queensland
Preceded by Hugh Macrossan	Member for Windsor; 1915–1918	Succeeded by Charles Taylor
