= Ray Smith (Australian politician) =

Australian politician

Member of the Queensland Legislative Assembly for Windsor
- In office 3 August 1957 – 10 March 1969
- Preceded by: Thomas Rasey
- Succeeded by: Bob Moore

Personal details
- Born: Percy Raymund Smith; 12 January 1920 Warwick, Queensland, Australia
- Died: 10 February 2002 (aged 82) Gold Coast, Queensland, Australia
- Party: Liberal Party
- Spouse: Cecile Judith Margaret Clowes
- Education: University of Queensland
- Occupation: Barrister

Percy Raymund Smith (12 January 1920 – 10 February 2002) was a member of the Queensland Legislative Assembly.

== Biography ==
Smith was born in Warwick, Queensland, the son of the Percy Reginald Smith and his wife Anne (née Kennedy). He was educated at St Agatha's Convent until 1926, then attended St Columban's College in Albion, before finishing his schooling at St Joseph's College, Gregory Terrace. He began his working life at Shell Australia and the Queensland National Bank before World War II commenced and he joined the RAAF as a pilot in the Pacific and Darwin, being discharged in 1945 at the rank of Flight Lieutenant.

As part of the post-war reconstruction scheme, Smith passed the senior public university examination and graduated from the University of Queensland with a Bachelor of Laws. He was a member of the RAAF Reserve from its formation in 1949 and a flying instructor with the Citizen Air Force in 1951. In 1964 he became a Deputy Judge Advocate General for RAAF, holding the role until 1976 and by 1967 he had rejoined the RAAF as a Staff Officer in Vietnam.

He married Cecile Judith Margaret Clowes and together had three sons and a daughter. He died on the Gold Coast in February 2002 with his funeral being held at St Kevins Catholic Church, Geebung.

== Public life ==
Representing the Liberal Party, Smith won the seat of Windsor at the 1957 Queensland state elections, defeating the sitting QLP member, Thomas Rasey. He remained the member until he retired just prior to the 1969 Queensland state elections to be a foundation member of the first Law Reform Commission of Queensland.

Whilst Smith was never a minister, he held several roles in the parliament:

- Member of the Government Committee to Investigate Youth Problems
- Temporary Chairman of Committees
- Member of the parliamentary mission to Asia - 1968
- Overseas study tour of parliaments and parliamentary institutions - 1971
- Chairman of the all-party committee investigating motor vehicle insurance
- Chairman of the Parliamentary Justice Committee - six years
- Chairman and government representative of the advisory committee for legal aid under the legal assistance Act - 1965

He was reappointed three times to the Law Reform Commission of Queensland before contesting the ward of Stafford in the Brisbane City Council election in 1972. He then won the ward of Chermside, holding it for two terms.

Smith was on many other committees including the Board of Advice for the Lifeline's Consumer Credit Counselling Service, the 1958 and 1962 Davis Cup Committees. He was chairman of more than 40 Housing Societies and president of the United Service Club, the Kedron-Wavell RSL Club, the Air Force Association (North Brisbane Branch), and the United Service Institute of Queensland.

Preceded by Thomas Rasey	Member for Windsor; 1957–1969	Succeeded by Bob Moore
