= John Beals Chandler =

Australian politician

The Right Honourable Sir John Beals Chandler
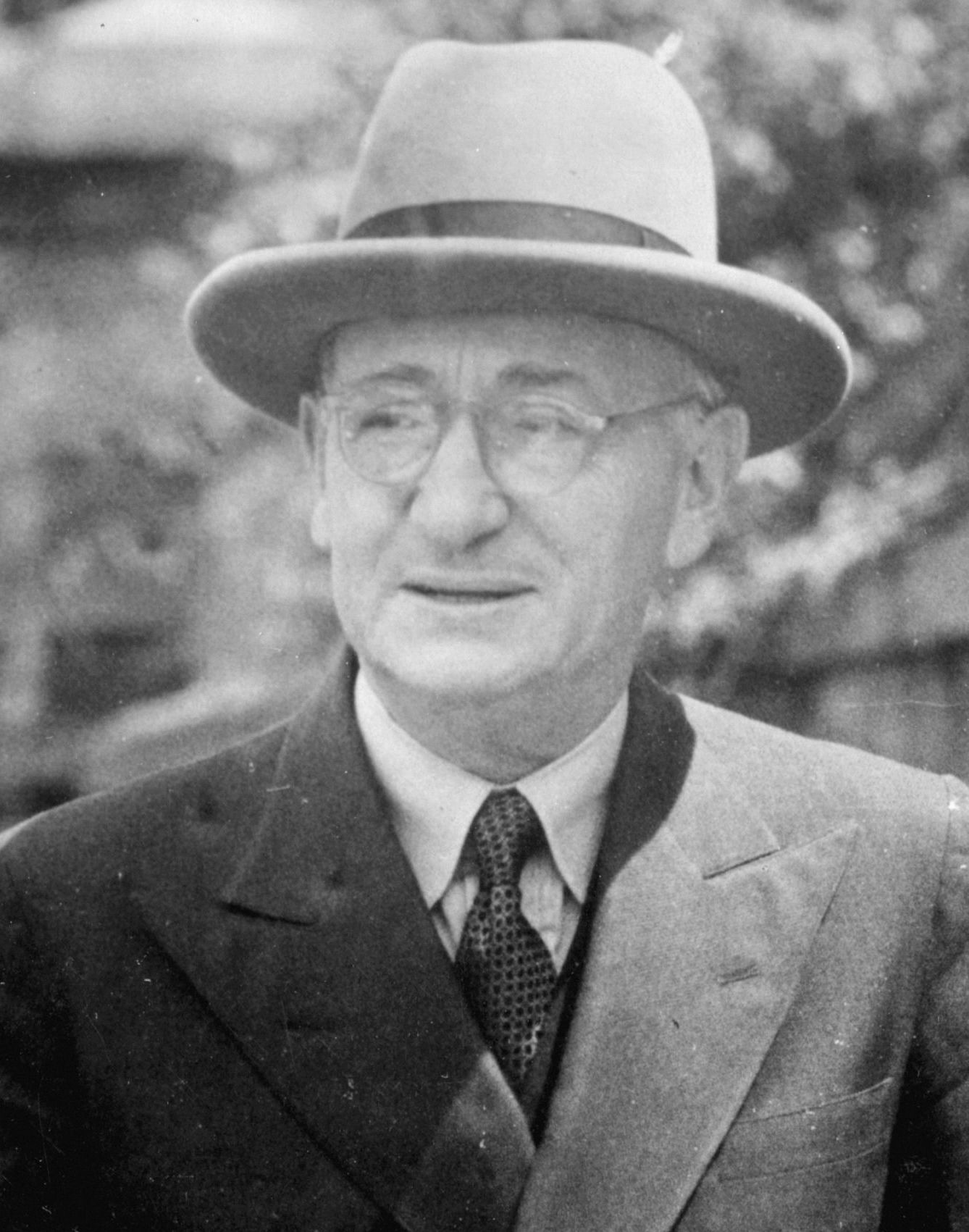

Leader of the Queensland People's Party
- In office 27 October 1943 – 9 March 1946
- Deputy: Bruce Pie
- Preceded by: Position established
- Succeeded by: Bruce Pie

Member of the Queensland Legislative Assembly for Hamilton
- In office 20 October 1943 – 2 May 1947
- Preceded by: Bruce Pie
- Succeeded by: Harold Taylor

5th Lord Mayor of Brisbane
- In office 27 April 1940 – June 1952
- Preceded by: Alfred James Jones
- Succeeded by: Frank Roberts

Personal details
- Born: 21 February 1887 Bunwell, Norfolk, England
- Died: 21 January 1962 (aged 74) St Lucia, Queensland, Australia
- Party: People's Party
- Other political affiliations: Citizens' Municipal Organisation
- Spouse: Lydia Isabel Parish
- Occupation: Businessman

Sir John Beals Chandler (21 February 1887 – 19 January 1962), frequently referred to as J. B. Chandler, was the Lord Mayor of Brisbane from 1940 to 1952, and the Member for the Legislative Assembly of Queensland, representing the electorate of Hamilton from the October 1943 by-election to the 1947 state election, where he chose not to seek re-election.

In 2021 John Beals Chandler was inducted into the Queensland Business Leaders Hall of Fame.

== Personal life ==
John Beals Chandler was born in Bunwell, Norfolk, England, on 21 February 1887. From a poor family, he left school at the age of 8, and emigrated to Queensland in 1907 to work as a sugarcane cutter in Mossman, Queensland.

In 1912 he married Lydia Isabel Parish in Brisbane. They had four sons; two of whom were killed in the World War II: Keith John Chandler (age 21) and Roger Staniforth Chandler (age 25).

A committed Anglican, Chandler lived out his belief that capitalism should operate in the interests of the many rather than the few.

== Businesses ==
Chandler opened his first hardware store in Elizabeth St, Brisbane in 1913. Chandler increasingly focussed on electrical household appliances and opened a larger store as "J. B. Chandler & Co" in Adelaide St in 1923. This business grew to become the public company Chandlers Pty Ltd, with 25 stores across Queensland and northern NSW, in 1938. Chandlers remained a family-controlled business until 1977.

In 1930 he founded the Brisbane radio station 4BC (4 "Beals Chandler") to stimulate demand for his radio sets. He went on to own various other Queensland radio stations, including 4BH in Brisbane.

== Politics ==
=== Taringa Shire Council ===
Chandler was a councillor for the Shire of Taringa before the 1925 amalgamation to form Brisbane City Council.

=== Brisbane City Council ===
Chandler was elected Lord Mayor in 1940 as the Citizens' Municipal Organisation (CMO) candidate. He was reelected and served out 4 full terms as Lord Mayor, before being defeated in the 1952 election.

=== Queensland Legislative Assembly ===
Chandler was elected to the Legislative Assembly of Queensland district of Hamilton as an Independent in 1943. Shortly after his election, he founded the Queensland People's Party. This party later absorbed the Queensland branch of the United Australia Party, and became the Queensland branch of the Liberal Party of Australia in 1948.

Chandler retired from the Legislative Assembly in 1947. He remained Lord Mayor of Brisbane until 1952, the year he was knighted, and remained chairman and managing director of Chandlers until his death.

== Later life ==
Chandler died at home in St Lucia, Brisbane in 1962.

== Legacy ==
The Brisbane suburb of Chandler was named after him.

The St Lucia park “Sir John Chandler Park” was named in his honour in 1959. It lies on one half of the Long Pocket reach, at the end of Meiers Road. Image

Chandler was inducted into the Queensland Business Leaders Hall of Fame in 2021, for his significant contributions to retail and radio broadcasting networks in Queensland and exceptional community service.

== See also ==
- Members of the Queensland Legislative Assembly, 1941–1944
- Members of the Queensland Legislative Assembly, 1941–1944

Civic offices
Preceded by Alfred James Jones	Lord Mayor of Brisbane; 1940–1952	Succeeded by Frank Roberts
Parliament of Queensland
Preceded by Bruce Pie	Member for Hamilton; 1943–1947	Succeeded by Harold Taylor
