= Bunwell =

Village in Norfolk, England

Coordinates: 52.501°N 1.117°E

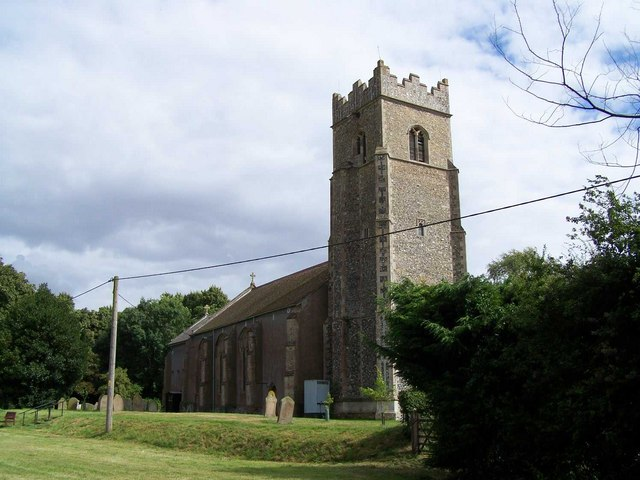
- Church of St. Michael & All Angels

- Location within Norfolk
- Area: 10.11 km^{2} (3.90 sq mi)
- Population: 1,000 (2021)
  - Density: 99/km^{2} (260/sq mi)
- OS grid reference: TM117938
- District: South Norfolk
- Shire county: Norfolk
- Region: East
- Country: England
- Sovereign state: United Kingdom
- Post town: NORWICH
- Postcode district: NR16
- Dialling code: 01953
- Police: Norfolk
- Fire: Norfolk
- Ambulance: East of England
- UK Parliament: Waveney Valley

Bunwell is a village and civil parish in the English county of Norfolk. It is 4 1/2 miles (7.2 km) east of Attleborough and 11 miles (18 km) south-west of Norwich. The parish includes the hamlets of Bunwell Hill, Low Common, and Cordwell.

At the 2021 census Bunwell had a population of 1,000, a slight decrease from the 2011 census. The B1113, between St Olaves and Lowestoft, runs through the parish. Parts of the former RAF Tibenham airfield are in the south of the parish.

Bunwell Primary School & Nursery is part of the Co-operative Education East Multi-Academy Trust.

== St. Michael and All Angels' Church ==
Bunwell's parish church is dedicated to Saint Michael and dates from the 15th century. The building is Grade I. The church was rebuilt in the perpendicular style in the 19th century after donations were left by William Smith, William Taylor and Robert Lincoln. It has a carvedfont, a set of royal arms dating from the reign of Queen Anne, and stained-glass windows depicting knights in armour designed by Hardman & Co.

== Sport and recreation ==
Bunwell Athletic Football Club play home games at Bunwell Recreation Ground and compete in the Norwich and District Sunday League. The operations of the club were put in jeopardy in 2016 after an arson attack, yet the club was able to continue due to support from the local community and Norfolk FA.

A greyhound racing track was opened on a meadow where hare coursing used to take place. The racing was independent and not affiliated to the National Greyhound Racing Club. Racing took place from 1935 to 1940, but the site closed during Second World War.
