= Bob Moore (politician) =

Australian politician

Member of the Queensland Legislative Assembly for Windsor
- In office 17 May 1969 – 22 October 1983
- Preceded by: Ray Smith
- Succeeded by: Pat Comben

Personal details
- Born: Robert Edgar Moore; 27 June 1923 Murgon, Queensland, Australia
- Died: 6 June 2011 (aged 87) Brisbane, Queensland, Australia
- Party: National Party
- Other political affiliations: Liberal Party
- Spouse: Mildred Miranda Keating (m.1948)
- Occupation: Queensland Rail employee

Robert Edgar "Bob" Moore (27 June 1923 – 6 June 2011) was a member of the Queensland Legislative Assembly.

== Biography ==
Moore was born at Murgon, Queensland, the son of Alexander Charles Moore and his wife, Ada Irene (née Rippingale). He was educated at Murgon State School and in World War II joined the RAAF in 1942. He served with the 86th Squadron until 1946 and then served in the Royal Netherlands Indies Air Service until 1947. Moore then worked for Queensland Rail until 1969.

On 17 January 1948, he married Mildred Miranda Keating and together they had one daughter. He died in Brisbane in June 2011 and was cremated at the Albany Creek Crematorium.

== Public life ==
Representing the Liberal Party, Moore won the seat of Windsor at the 1969 Queensland state election. After holding the seat for fourteen years, the Liberal Party refused to re-endorse him for the state election in 1983, and Moore then joined the National Party to get endorsement. The change of party did not help him however, and at that election he lost his seat to Labor's Pat Comben.

Whilst Moore was never a minister, he held the following roles in the parliament:

- Deputy Government Whip - 1976-1983
- Member of the Parliamentary Buildings Committee - 1972
- Member of the parliamentary delegation to Papua New Guinea and South-East Asia - 1974
- Overseas study tour of parliaments and parliamentary institutions - 1971

Preceded by Ray Smith	Member for Windsor; 1969–1983	Succeeded by Pat Comben
