= Hugh Russell (politician) =

Australian politician

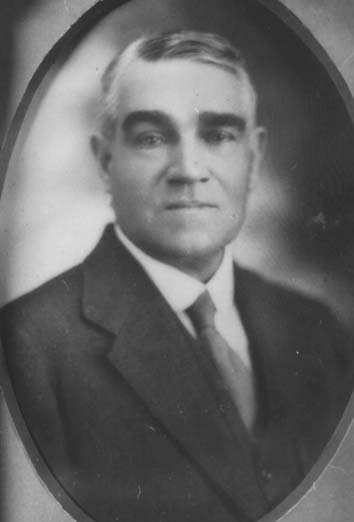
- Hugh Russell - 1925

Member of the Queensland Legislative Assembly for Toombul
- In office 8 May 1926 – 11 June 1932
- Preceded by: Andrew Petrie
- Succeeded by: Seat abolished

Member of the Queensland Legislative Assembly for Hamilton
- In office 11 June 1932 – 29 Mar 1941
- Preceded by: New seat
- Succeeded by: Bruce Pie

Personal details
- Born: Hugh McDiarmid Russell; 11 February 1873 Beenleigh, Queensland, Australia
- Died: 6 May 1948 (aged 51) Brisbane, Queensland, Australia
- Party: United Australia Party
- Other political affiliations: Country and Progressive National Party
- Spouse: Violet Simmons Bailey (m.1904 d.1968)
- Occupation: General importer and exporter

Hugh McDiarmid Russell (11 February 1873 – 6 May 1948) was a general importer and exporter and member of the Queensland Legislative Assembly.

== Biography ==
Windsor was born in Beenleigh to parents George Dick Russell and his wife Mary (née McDiarmid). He was educated at Brisbane Normal School and Brisbane Grammar School and began work at Hower Bros. and then Queensland Agricultural Company. By 1901 he had his own business as a general importer and exporter.

On 1 December 1904 Russell married Violet Bailey (died 1968) and they had no children. He died in May 1948 and his funeral proceeded from St Augustine's Church of England, Hamilton to the Mt Thompson Crematorium.

== Public career ==
Russell was an alderman in the Hamilton Town Council from 1910 until 1925 including its mayor in 1914–1915. He then joined the Brisbane City Council as an alderman in 1925–1926.

At the 1926 Queensland state election, Russell, the CPNP candidate, won the seat of Toombul, holding it until it was abolished before the 1932 state election. He then won the new seat of Hamilton, holding it until he was defeated in 1941. For the last five years of his political career he was the state leader of the United Australia Party.

He was one of the most talented speakers in parliament, especially when it came to taxation, local government and government finances. Russell was President of the Brisbane Chamber of Commerce from 1931 until 1933, and a member of the State Stores Board, the Brisbane Tramways Trust, the Hamilton Red Cross Society and the Hamilton Patriotic Association.

Parliament of Queensland
Preceded by Andrew Petrie	Member for Toombul; 1926–1932	Abolished
New seat	Member for Hamilton; 1932–1941	Succeeded by Bruce Pie
