= Charles Taylor (Australian politician) =

Australian politician

The Honourable Charles Taylor
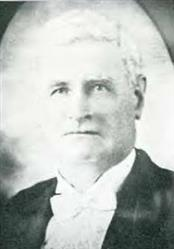

17th Speaker of the Queensland Legislative Assembly
- In office 20 August 1929 – 11 June 1932
- Preceded by: William Bertram
- Succeeded by: George Pollock

Leader of the Opposition of Queensland
- In office 11 July 1923 – 9 April 1924
- Preceded by: William Vowles
- Succeeded by: Arthur Moore

Member of the Queensland Legislative Assembly for Windsor
- In office 16 March 1918 – 11 May 1935
- Preceded by: Herbert McPhail
- Succeeded by: Herbert Williams

Personal details
- Born: 24 March 1861 Melbourne, Victoria, Australia
- Died: 27 April 1944 (aged 83) Brisbane, Queensland, Australia
- Party: CPNP
- Other political affiliations: National, Queensland United Party
- Spouse: Emma Jane Skewes (m. 1884; died 1942)
- Occupation: Merchant

Charles Taylor (24 March 1861 – 27 April 1944) was a member of the Queensland Legislative Assembly.

He was born in Melbourne, Victoria, the son of George Taylor and his wife Mary Albina (née Holder). After attending the Church of England school in Ballarat he was an agent for a produce firm in Sydney, before running a seed and produce agency in Brisbane.

On 31 January 1884, Taylor married Emma Jane Skewes (died 1942) in Ballarat and together had two sons and a daughter. He died in Brisbane in April 1944 and was cremated at the Mount Thompson Crematorium.

== Political career ==
Taylor started his career in politics as an alderman on the Windsor Town Council, including serving as mayor in 1915.

He entered Queensland state politics as a member of the National Party, winning the seat of Windsor at the 1918 state election. He held the seat until 1935, when he was defeated by Herbert Williams of the Labor Party. He was Leader of the Opposition from 1923 until 1924, and the Speaker of the Queensland Legislative Assembly from 1929 until 1932.

Parliament of Queensland
Preceded by Herbert McPhail	Member for Windsor; 1918–1935	Succeeded by Herbert Williams
Political offices
Preceded by William Vowles	Leader of the Opposition in Queensland; 1923–1924	Succeeded by Arthur Moore
Preceded by William Bertram	Speaker of the Legislative Assembly of Queensland; 1929–1932	Succeeded by George Pollock
