= Harry Moorhouse (politician) =

Australian politician

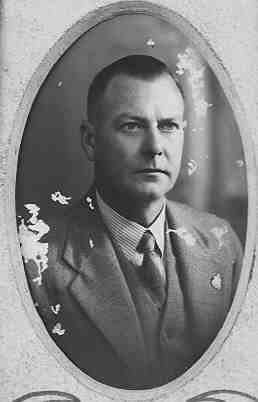
- Harry Moorhouse c.1940

Member of the Queensland Legislative Assembly for Windsor
- In office 29 March 1941 – 15 Apr 1944
- Preceded by: Herbert
- Succeeded by: Bruce Pie

Personal details
- Born: Harry Russell Moorhouse; 1 June 1892 Brisbane, Queensland, Australia
- Died: 13 December 1971 (aged 79) Townsville, Queensland, Australia
- Party: Independent Democrat
- Spouse: Winifred Vera Sharpe (m.1921 d.1971)
- Occupation: Accountant

Harry Russell Moorhouse (1 June 1892 – 13 December 1971) was a member of the Queensland Legislative Assembly.

== Biography ==
Moorhouse was born in Brisbane, Queensland, the son of James Moorhouse and his wife Eva Annie (née Case). He was educated at Queensland state schools and in his early twenties joined the First Australian Imperial Force to fight in World War I. He was an original ANZAC and saw action at Gallipoli, Belgium and France. On his return to Australia he worked as an accountant and real estate agent.

On 7 December 1921, he married Winifred Vera Sharpe (died 1971) and together had a son and two daughters. He died in Townsville in December 1971.

== Public life ==
Moorhouse started his career in politics as an alderman on the Brisbane City Council, serving in 1937 to 1942 during which he was on the works committee.

He entered Queensland state politics as an independent democrat and won the seat of Windsor at the 1941 state election. He held the seat until 1944 when he was comprehensively defeated by both the Labor and QPP candidates.

| Preceded by Herbert Williams | Member for Windsor; 1941–1944 | Succeeded by Bruce Pie |
