= Electoral district of Windsor (Queensland) =

Former state electoral district of Queensland, Australia

Windsor Queensland—Legislative Assembly
- State: Queensland
- Dates current: 1912–1992
- Namesake: Windsor

Windsor was an electoral district of the Legislative Assembly in the Australian state of Queensland from 1912 to 1992.

First created for the 1912 state election, the district was based in the northern suburbs of Brisbane, taking in areas north of Breakfast Creek and south of Kedron Brook. Later redistributions expanded the district westward, whilst still retaining the suburbs of Alderley, Grange, Wilston and Windsor.

Windsor was abolished ahead of 1992 state election, divided between the pre-existing district of Brisbane Central and the new district of Kedron.

== Members for Windsor ==
Member	Party	Term
Hugh Macrossan	Liberal	1912–1915
Herbert McPhail	Labor	1915–1918
Charles Taylor	National; United; Country and Progressive National	1918–1935
Herbert Williams	Labor	1935–1941
Harry Moorhouse	Independent Democrat	1941–1944
Bruce Pie	Queensland People's	1944–1950
Tom Rasey	Labor	1950–1957
Tom Rasey	Queensland Labor	1957
Ray Smith	Liberal	1957–1969
Bob Moore	Liberal	1969–1983
Bob Moore	National	1983
Pat Comben	Labor	1983–1992

== See also ==
- Electoral districts of Queensland
- Members of the Queensland Legislative Assembly by year
- Category:Members of the Queensland Legislative Assembly by name
