= Bruce Pie =

Australian politician

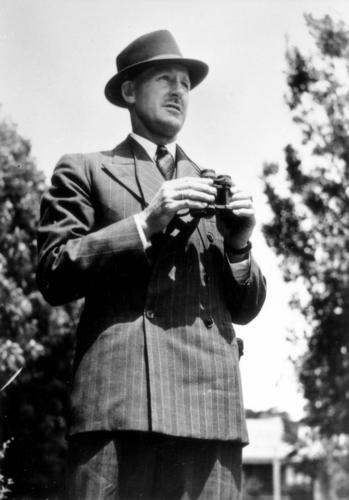

2nd Leader of the Queensland People's Party
- In office 1946–1948
- Preceded by: John Beals Chandler
- Succeeded by: Thomas Hiley

Member of the Queensland Legislative Assembly for Hamilton
- In office 1941–1943
- Preceded by: Hugh Russell
- Succeeded by: John Beals Chandler

Member of the Queensland Legislative Assembly for Windsor
- In office 1944–1950
- Preceded by: Harry Moorhouse
- Succeeded by: Thomas Rasey

Member of the Queensland Legislative Assembly for Kedron
- In office 1950–1951
- Preceded by: New seat
- Succeeded by: Eric Lloyd

Personal details
- Born: Arthur Bruce Pie; 18 May 1902 Coburg, Victoria
- Died: 30 July 1962 (aged 60) Sydney, New South Wales
- Party: Queensland People's Party
- Other political affiliations: Liberal Party; Independent Democrat
- Spouse: Jean Margaret Wright
- Occupation: Businessman
Australian rules football career
Personal information
- Original team: Caulfield Grammarians
- Height: 180 cm (5 ft 11 in)
- Weight: 66 kg (146 lb)
Playing career^{1}
Years	Club	Games (Goals)
1926	Melbourne	1 (0)
- ^{1} Playing statistics correct to the end of 1926.

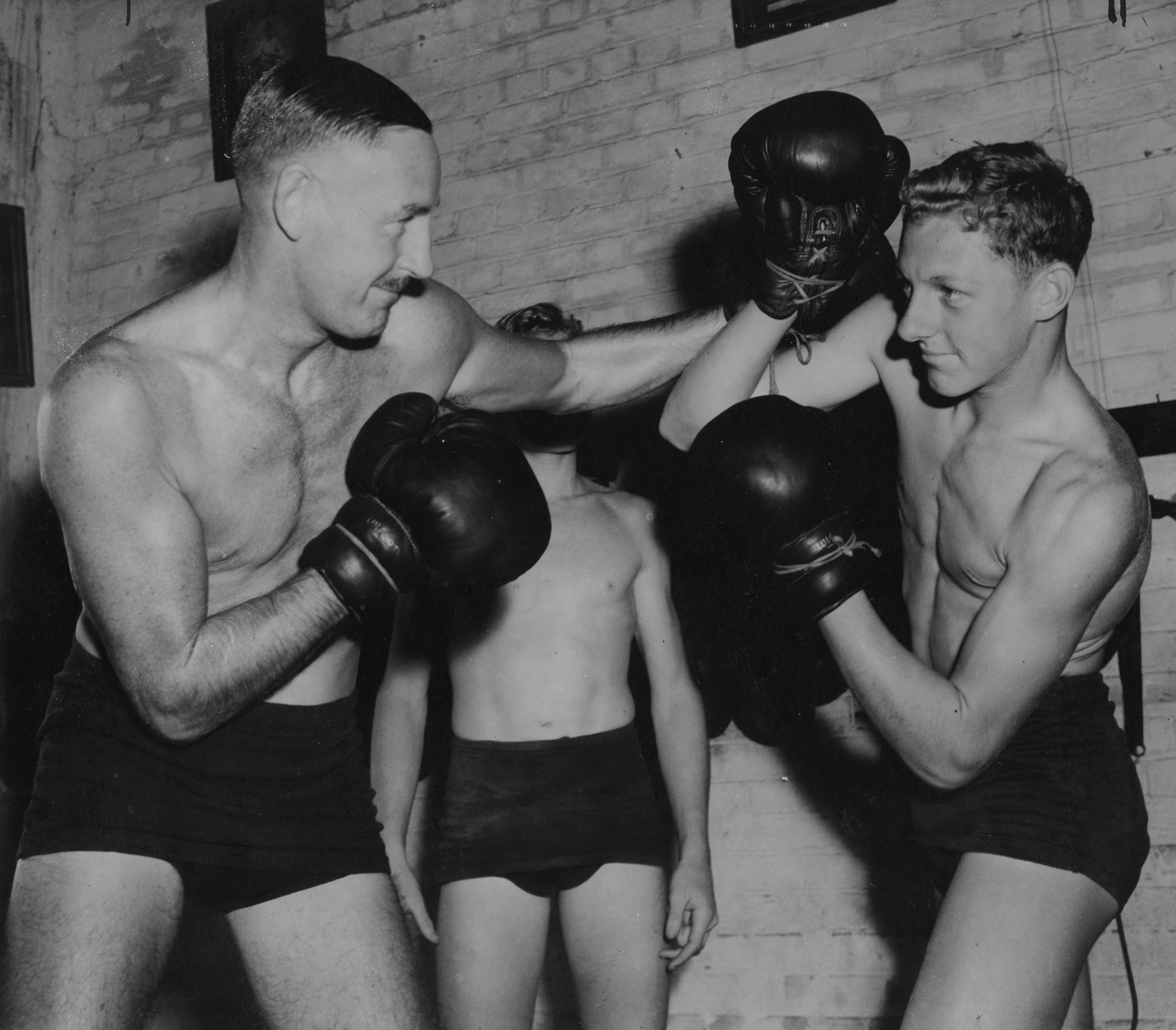
Bruce Pie teaching children how to box

Arthur Bruce Pie (18 May 1902 – 30 July 1962) was an Australian politician who served in the Legislative Assembly of Queensland.

== Early life ==
The son of Arthur Savoi Garibaldi Pie, and Annie Gertrude Pie, née Miller, Arthur Bruce Pie was born in Coburg, Victoria on 18 May 1902.

He married Jean Margaret Wright at Clayfield, Brisbane, Queensland on 24 June 1925.

== Education ==
He attended Caulfield Grammar School 1916–1917, and played for the school's First XVIII.

== Football ==
=== Caulfield Grammarians (MAFA) ===
He played with the Caulfield Grammarians Football Club, and was its coach on 1926.

=== Brisbane (QFL) ===
In 1924 he was captain of Brisbane Football Club, and only ceased playing for the team when he was transferred, with his employment, to Melbourne in 1925.

=== Melbourne (VFL) ===
He also played one senior game of Australian rules football in the Victorian Football League for Melbourne in 1926.

He was the president of the Queensland National Football Association in the 1930s.

== Employment ==
Pie worked in Melbourne and Brisbane in the importing and textile manufacturing industries, and owned his own group of businesses.

== Political career ==
Pie was elected to Queensland Parliament in 1941 as an independent Democrat, but resigned to contest the seat of Brisbane in the 1943 federal election. He was defeated by the incumbent George Lawson, and re-entered the Queensland Legislative Assembly in 1944 as the Member for Windsor from the Queensland People's Party (QPP).

Pie succeeded John Beals Chandler as the leader of the QPP in 1946, and served in this role until 1948. In 1950 he became the Member for Kedron as a Liberal Party politician, but he resigned from the Party following a dispute about parliamentary pay increases, and resigned from Parliament in 1951.

== Journey into Desolation ==
Pie visited the concentration camps of Nazi Germany in 1945 shortly after the end of the Third Reich, and published a book called Journey into Desolation (Pie, 1946) after this experience.

== Later life ==
Following his political career, Pie was a member and leader of several Brisbane clubs until his death.

== See also ==
- List of Caulfield Grammar School people

== Footnotes ==
Parliament of Queensland
Preceded by Hugh Russell	Member for Hamilton; 1941–1943	Succeeded by John Beals Chandler
Preceded by Harry Moorhouse	Member for Windsor; 1944–1950	Succeeded by Thomas Rasey
New seat	Member for Kedron; 1950–1951	Succeeded by Eric Lloyd
