= Electoral district of Hamilton (Queensland) =

Coordinates: 27°26′15″S 153°03′48″E

Hamilton Queensland—Legislative Assembly
- State: Queensland
- Created: 1932
- Abolished: 1950
- Namesake: Hamilton, Queensland

Hamilton was an electoral district of the Legislative Assembly in the Australian state of Queensland from 1932 to 1950.

The district was based in the inner northeastern suburbs of Brisbane, and included the suburbs of Albion, Ascot, Eagle Farm, Hamilton and Hendra. It was a safe seat for the non-Labor parties in the Assembly throughout its existence. This district became part of the electoral district of Clayfield when it was created in 1950.

== Members for Hamilton ==
Member	Party	Term
Hugh Russell	CPNP	1932–1936
Hugh Russell	United Australia	1936–1941
Bruce Pie	Independent Democrat	1941–1943
Sir John Beals Chandler	QPP	1943–1947
Harold Taylor	QPP	1947–1948
Harold Taylor	Liberal	1948–1950

== See also ==
- Electoral districts of Queensland
- Members of the Queensland Legislative Assembly by year
- Category:Members of the Queensland Legislative Assembly by name
