= Results of the 1956 Queensland state election =

Queensland state election, 19 May 1956 Legislative Assembly << 1953–1957 >>
| Enrolled voters | 712,508^{[1]} | | | | |
| Votes cast | 662,680 | | Turnout | 93.01 | –0.79 |
| Informal votes | 8,006 | | Informal | 1.21 | –0.07 |
Summary of votes by party
| Party | Primary votes | % | Swing | Seats | Change |
| Labor | 335,311 | 51.22 | –1.99 | 49 | –1 |
| Liberal | 164,116 | 25.07 | +3.77 | 8 | ±0 |
| Country | 126,183 | 19.27 | +0.53 | 16 | +1 |
| North Queensland Labor | 8,625 | 1.32 | +0.22 | 1 | ±0 |
| Communist | 1,332 | 0.20 | –0.45 | 0 | ±0 |
| Ind. Labor | 414 | 0.06 | –0.08 | 0 | ±0 |
| Independent | 18,693 | 2.86 | –0.26 | 1 | ±0 |
| Total | 654,674 | | | 75 | |

This is a list of electoral district results for the 1956 Queensland state election.

== Results by electoral district ==
=== Aubigny ===
1956 Queensland state election: Aubigny
| Party | Candidate | Votes | % | ±% |
|---|---|---|---|---|
| Country | Jim Sparkes | 6,409 | 72.6 | +13.3 |
| Labor | William Alexander | 2,423 | 27.4 | +27.4 |
| Total formal votes | | 8,832 | 99.3 | +0.2 |
| Informal votes | | 64 | 0.7 | −0.2 |
| Turnout | | 8,896 | 95.5 | +0.5 |
| Country hold | | Swing | N/A | |

=== Balonne ===
1956 Queensland state election: Balonne
| Party | Candidate | Votes | % | ±% |
|---|---|---|---|---|
| Labor | John Taylor | 2,616 | 56.7 | −4.5 |
| Country | Eric McCorkell | 1,997 | 43.3 | +4.5 |
| Total formal votes | | 4,613 | 98.8 | −0.3 |
| Informal votes | | 57 | 1.2 | +0.3 |
| Turnout | | 4,670 | 85.8 | +0.4 |
| Labor hold | | Swing | −4.5 | |

=== Barambah ===
1956 Queensland state election: Barambah
| Party | Candidate | Votes | % | ±% |
|---|---|---|---|---|
| Country | Joh Bjelke-Petersen | unopposed | | |
| Country hold | | Swing | | |

=== Barcoo ===
1956 Queensland state election: Barcoo
| Party | Candidate | Votes | % | ±% |
|---|---|---|---|---|
| Labor | Ned Davis | 3,008 | 67.6 | −32.4 |
| Country | Wally Rae | 1,444 | 32.4 | +32.4 |
| Total formal votes | | 4,452 | 98.8 | |
| Informal votes | | 55 | 1.2 | |
| Turnout | | 4,507 | 87.4 | |
| Labor hold | | Swing | N/A | |

=== Baroona ===
1956 Queensland state election: Baroona
| Party | Candidate | Votes | % | ±% |
|---|---|---|---|---|
| Labor | Bill Power | 5,525 | 64.8 | −35.2 |
| Liberal | Robert Thomasson | 2,816 | 33.0 | +33.0 |
| Communist | Kevin Loughlin | 190 | 2.2 | +2.2 |
| Total formal votes | | 8,531 | 98.5 | |
| Informal votes | | 126 | 1.5 | |
| Turnout | | 8,657 | 90.7 | |
| Labor hold | | Swing | N/A | |

=== Belyando ===
1956 Queensland state election: Belyando
| Party | Candidate | Votes | % | ±% |
|---|---|---|---|---|
| Labor | Tom Foley | 2,512 | 58.7 | −41.3 |
| Country | Timothy Donnelly | 1,770 | 41.3 | +41.3 |
| Total formal votes | | 4,282 | 99.2 | |
| Informal votes | | 33 | 0.8 | |
| Turnout | | 4,315 | 85.9 | |
| Labor hold | | Swing | N/A | |

=== Bremer ===
1956 Queensland state election: Bremer
| Party | Candidate | Votes | % | ±% |
|---|---|---|---|---|
| Labor | Jim Donald | 7,826 | 72.7 | −27.3 |
| Liberal | George Groth | 2,938 | 27.3 | +27.3 |
| Total formal votes | | 10,764 | 98.6 | |
| Informal votes | | 149 | 1.4 | |
| Turnout | | 10,913 | 94.3 | |
| Labor hold | | Swing | N/A | |

=== Brisbane ===
1956 Queensland state election: Brisbane
| Party | Candidate | Votes | % | ±% |
|---|---|---|---|---|
| Labor | Johnno Mann | 4,402 | 60.0 | −15.2 |
| Liberal | Roger Moore | 2,569 | 35.0 | +35.0 |
| Independent | Peter Day | 369 | 5.0 | +5.0 |
| Total formal votes | | 7,340 | 98.2 | |
| Informal votes | | 137 | 1.8 | |
| Turnout | | 7,477 | 86.8 | |
| Labor hold | | Swing | N/A | |

=== Bulimba ===
1956 Queensland state election: Bulimba
| Party | Candidate | Votes | % | ±% |
|---|---|---|---|---|
| Labor | Bob Gardner | 7,437 | 56.7 | −7.3 |
| Liberal | John Mills | 5,350 | 40.7 | +4.7 |
| Independent | Herbert Ricketts | 341 | 2.6 | +2.6 |
| Total formal votes | | 13,128 | 98.5 | 0.0 |
| Informal votes | | 201 | 1.5 | 0.0 |
| Turnout | | 13,329 | 95.0 | −0.7 |
| Labor hold | | Swing | −6.0 | |

=== Bundaberg ===
1956 Queensland state election: Bundaberg
| Party | Candidate | Votes | % | ±% |
|---|---|---|---|---|
| Labor | Ted Walsh | unopposed | | |
| Labor hold | | Swing | | |

=== Buranda ===
1956 Queensland state election: Buranda
| Party | Candidate | Votes | % | ±% |
|---|---|---|---|---|
| Labor | Dick Brown | 5,129 | 55.5 | −8.0 |
| Liberal | Keith Hooper | 4,118 | 44.5 | +8.0 |
| Total formal votes | | 9,247 | 99.1 | +0.2 |
| Informal votes | | 86 | 0.9 | −0.2 |
| Turnout | | 9,333 | 94.1 | −0.2 |
| Labor hold | | Swing | −8.0 | |

=== Burdekin ===
1956 Queensland state election: Burdekin
| Party | Candidate | Votes | % | ±% |
|---|---|---|---|---|
| Independent | Arthur Coburn | 4,891 | 63.9 | +5.9 |
| Labor | Henry Skinner | 2,546 | 33.3 | −8.7 |
| Communist | Howard Connors | 215 | 2.8 | +2.8 |
| Total formal votes | | 7,652 | 99.1 | +0.5 |
| Informal votes | | 67 | 0.9 | −0.5 |
| Turnout | | 7,719 | 94.9 | −1.2 |
| Independent hold | | Swing | +7.3 | |

=== Cairns ===
1956 Queensland state election: Cairns
| Party | Candidate | Votes | % | ±% |
|---|---|---|---|---|
| Labor | Watty Wallace | 4,688 | 58.9 | −0.7 |
| Country | Harold Mulry | 2,258 | 28.4 | −2.9 |
| Independent | Henry Smallwood | 1,008 | 12.7 | +12.7 |
| Total formal votes | | 7,954 | 98.9 | +0.3 |
| Informal votes | | 88 | 1.1 | −0.3 |
| Turnout | | 8,042 | 90.2 | −0.4 |
| Labor hold | | Swing | +2.9 | |

=== Callide ===
1956 Queensland state election: Callide
| Party | Candidate | Votes | % | ±% |
|---|---|---|---|---|
| Country | Vince Jones | 6,396 | 65.1 | +1.2 |
| Labor | Eric Willis | 3,435 | 34.9 | −1.2 |
| Total formal votes | | 9,831 | 98.8 | +1.7 |
| Informal votes | | 116 | 1.2 | −1.7 |
| Turnout | | 9,947 | 95.0 | −1.9 |
| Country hold | | Swing | +1.2 | |

=== Carnarvon ===
1956 Queensland state election: Carnarvon
| Party | Candidate | Votes | % | ±% |
|---|---|---|---|---|
| Labor | Paul Hilton | 5,416 | 58.2 | −3.2 |
| Country | Fred Rogers | 3,896 | 41.8 | +3.2 |
| Total formal votes | | 9,312 | 99.3 | +0.5 |
| Informal votes | | 67 | 0.7 | −0.5 |
| Turnout | | 9,379 | 92.0 | −0.1 |
| Labor hold | | Swing | −3.2 | |

=== Carpentaria ===
1956 Queensland state election: Carpentaria
| Party | Candidate | Votes | % | ±% |
|---|---|---|---|---|
| Labor | Norm Smith | 3,377 | 60.1 | −2.6 |
| Country | William Aplin | 2,240 | 39.9 | +2.6 |
| Total formal votes | | 5,617 | 99.1 | 0.0 |
| Informal votes | | 50 | 0.9 | 0.0 |
| Turnout | | 5,667 | 81.3 | −2.9 |
| Labor hold | | Swing | −2.6 | |

=== Charters Towers ===
1956 Queensland state election: Charters Towers
| Party | Candidate | Votes | % | ±% |
|---|---|---|---|---|
| Labor | Arthur Jones | 2,766 | 67.6 | −32.4 |
| Liberal | Jan Karlik | 1,329 | 32.4 | +32.4 |
| Total formal votes | | 4,095 | 99.0 | |
| Informal votes | | 40 | 1.0 | |
| Turnout | | 4,135 | 94.7 | |
| Labor hold | | Swing | N/A | |

=== Chermside ===
1956 Queensland state election: Chermside
| Party | Candidate | Votes | % | ±% |
|---|---|---|---|---|
| Liberal | Alex Dewar | 9,617 | 58.5 | +6.9 |
| Labor | Dudley Ryder | 6,831 | 41.5 | −6.9 |
| Total formal votes | | 16,448 | 98.6 | −0.6 |
| Informal votes | | 230 | 1.4 | +0.6 |
| Turnout | | 16,678 | 94.2 | −0.8 |
| Liberal hold | | Swing | +6.9 | |

=== Clayfield ===
1956 Queensland state election: Clayfield
| Party | Candidate | Votes | % | ±% |
|---|---|---|---|---|
| Liberal | Harold Taylor | 6,888 | 74.0 | −26.0 |
| Independent | James Ryan | 2,420 | 26.0 | +26.0 |
| Total formal votes | | 9,308 | 97.4 | |
| Informal votes | | 244 | 2.6 | |
| Turnout | | 9,552 | 90.2 | |
| Liberal hold | | Swing | N/A | |

=== Condamine ===
1956 Queensland state election: Condamine
| Party | Candidate | Votes | % | ±% |
|---|---|---|---|---|
| Labor | Les Diplock | 5,998 | 54.9 | +4.4 |
| Country | Stewart Keys | 4,919 | 45.1 | −4.4 |
| Total formal votes | | 10,917 | 99.5 | 0.0 |
| Informal votes | | 57 | 0.5 | 0.0 |
| Turnout | | 10,974 | 93.4 | +0.2 |
| Labor hold | | Swing | +4.4 | |

=== Cook ===
1956 Queensland state election: Cook
| Party | Candidate | Votes | % | ±% |
|---|---|---|---|---|
| Labor | Bunny Adair | 5,433 | 63.6 | +10.5 |
| Country | John Crossland | 3,110 | 36.4 | −10.5 |
| Total formal votes | | 8,543 | 98.8 | 0.0 |
| Informal votes | | 103 | 1.2 | 0.0 |
| Turnout | | 8,646 | 89.2 | −0.6 |
| Labor hold | | Swing | +10.5 | |

=== Cooroora ===
1956 Queensland state election: Cooroora
| Party | Candidate | Votes | % | ±% |
|---|---|---|---|---|
| Country | David Low | 6,396 | 68.2 | −1.9 |
| Labor | Geoffrey Arnell | 2,978 | 31.8 | +1.9 |
| Total formal votes | | 9,374 | 99.2 | −0.1 |
| Informal votes | | 72 | 0.8 | +0.1 |
| Turnout | | 9,446 | 94.1 | −0.5 |
| Country hold | | Swing | −1.9 | |

=== Coorparoo ===
1956 Queensland state election: Coorparoo
| Party | Candidate | Votes | % | ±% |
|---|---|---|---|---|
| Liberal | Thomas Hiley | 7,476 | 62.0 | +4.5 |
| Labor | Geoffrey Maher | 4,588 | 38.0 | −4.5 |
| Total formal votes | | 12,064 | 98.9 | −0.2 |
| Informal votes | | 134 | 1.1 | +0.2 |
| Turnout | | 12,198 | 94.5 | +0.5 |
| Liberal hold | | Swing | +4.5 | |

=== Cunningham ===
1956 Queensland state election: Cunningham
| Party | Candidate | Votes | % | ±% |
|---|---|---|---|---|
| Country | Alan Fletcher | 6,682 | 64.5 | +3.5 |
| Labor | John McCafferty | 3,718 | 35.5 | −3.5 |
| Total formal votes | | 10,400 | 99.3 | +0.1 |
| Informal votes | | 73 | 0.7 | −0.1 |
| Turnout | | 10,473 | 95.2 | +2.0 |
| Country hold | | Swing | +3.5 | |

=== Darlington ===
1956 Queensland state election: Darlington
| Party | Candidate | Votes | % | ±% |
|---|---|---|---|---|
| Country | Tom Plunkett | 6,823 | 67.9 | +1.3 |
| Labor | Charles Knoll | 3,223 | 32.1 | −1.3 |
| Total formal votes | | 10,046 | 98.7 | +1.8 |
| Informal votes | | 130 | 1.3 | −1.8 |
| Turnout | | 10,176 | 91.4 | −1.9 |
| Country hold | | Swing | +1.3 | |

=== Fassifern ===
1956 Queensland state election: Fassifern
| Party | Candidate | Votes | % | ±% |
|---|---|---|---|---|
| Country | Alf Muller | unopposed | | |
| Country hold | | Swing | | |

=== Fitzroy ===
1956 Queensland state election: Fitzroy
| Party | Candidate | Votes | % | ±% |
|---|---|---|---|---|
| Labor | Jim Clark | 5,472 | 62.6 | −6.9 |
| Liberal | Gerard Davies | 3,175 | 36.3 | +7.6 |
| Communist | Eric Browne | 100 | 1.1 | −0.7 |
| Total formal votes | | 8,747 | 99.0 | −0.1 |
| Informal votes | | 91 | 1.0 | +0.1 |
| Turnout | | 8,838 | 95.5 | +0.5 |
| Labor hold | | Swing | −7.2 | |

=== Flinders ===
1956 Queensland state election: Flinders
| Party | Candidate | Votes | % | ±% |
|---|---|---|---|---|
| Labor | Frank Forde | 2,269 | 58.1 | −41.9 |
| Country | Bill Longeran | 1,638 | 41.9 | +41.9 |
| Total formal votes | | 3,907 | 99.3 | |
| Informal votes | | 27 | 0.7 | |
| Turnout | | 3,934 | 83.1 | |
| Labor hold | | Swing | N/A | |

=== Fortitude Valley ===
1956 Queensland state election: Fortitude Valley
| Party | Candidate | Votes | % | ±% |
|---|---|---|---|---|
| Labor | Mick Brosnan | 4,963 | 57.2 | −14.9 |
| Liberal | Bob Windsor | 3,518 | 40.5 | +40.5 |
| Communist | Jim Henderson | 202 | 2.3 | −2.4 |
| Total formal votes | | 8,683 | 98.9 | +1.9 |
| Informal votes | | 99 | 1.1 | −1.9 |
| Turnout | | 8,782 | 91.6 | −0.2 |
| Labor hold | | Swing | N/A | |

=== Gregory ===
1956 Queensland state election: Gregory
| Party | Candidate | Votes | % | ±% |
|---|---|---|---|---|
| Labor | George Devries | 2,847 | 65.3 | −34.7 |
| Country | Robert Campbell | 1,516 | 34.7 | +34.7 |
| Total formal votes | | 4,363 | 99.3 | |
| Informal votes | | 32 | 0.7 | |
| Turnout | | 4,395 | 85.3 | |
| Labor hold | | Swing | N/A | |

=== Haughton ===
1956 Queensland state election: Haughton
| Party | Candidate | Votes | % | ±% |
|---|---|---|---|---|
| Labor | Colin McCathie | 5,737 | 70.4 | +11.2 |
| Liberal | Edwin Pearse | 2,415 | 29.6 | +29.6 |
| Total formal votes | | 8,152 | 98.9 | −0.5 |
| Informal votes | | 88 | 1.1 | +0.5 |
| Turnout | | 8,240 | 94.7 | −1.6 |
| Labor hold | | Swing | +1.4 | |

=== Hinchinbrook ===
1956 Queensland state election: Hinchinbrook
| Party | Candidate | Votes | % | ±% |
|---|---|---|---|---|
| Labor | Cecil Jesson | 4,319 | 52.1 | −7.2 |
| Liberal | Francis Curro | 3,964 | 47.9 | +27.5 |
| Total formal votes | | 8,283 | 98.5 | +0.3 |
| Informal votes | | 125 | 1.5 | −0.3 |
| Turnout | | 8,408 | 92.6 | +0.6 |
| Labor hold | | Swing | −17.3 | |

=== Ipswich ===
1956 Queensland state election: Ipswich
| Party | Candidate | Votes | % | ±% |
|---|---|---|---|---|
| Labor | Ivor Marsden | 5,689 | 61.2 | −33.4 |
| Liberal | Wylie Gibbs | 3,514 | 37.8 | +37.8 |
| Communist | Mev Welsby | 93 | 1.0 | −4.4 |
| Total formal votes | | 9,296 | 99.2 | +4.6 |
| Informal votes | | 74 | 0.8 | −4.6 |
| Turnout | | 9,370 | 93.9 | +0.6 |
| Labor hold | | Swing | N/A | |

=== Isis ===
1956 Queensland state election: Isis
| Party | Candidate | Votes | % | ±% |
|---|---|---|---|---|
| Country | Jack Pizzey | 5,753 | 62.3 | +3.6 |
| Labor | Hylton Salter | 3,475 | 37.7 | −3.6 |
| Total formal votes | | 9,228 | 98.6 | −0.1 |
| Informal votes | | 131 | 1.4 | +0.1 |
| Turnout | | 9,359 | 93.3 | −1.3 |
| Country hold | | Swing | +3.6 | |

=== Ithaca ===
1956 Queensland state election: Ithaca
| Party | Candidate | Votes | % | ±% |
|---|---|---|---|---|
| Labor | Leonard Eastment | 5,967 | 61.7 | −3.3 |
| Liberal | Alan Edwards | 3,711 | 38.3 | +4.7 |
| Total formal votes | | 9,678 | 98.6 | −0.3 |
| Informal votes | | 138 | 1.4 | +0.3 |
| Turnout | | 9,816 | 94.2 | −1.2 |
| Labor hold | | Swing | −4.5 | |

==== By-election ====
- This by-election was caused by the death of Leonard Eastment. It was held on 8 December 1956.

1956 Ithaca state by-election
| Party | Candidate | Votes | % | ±% |
|---|---|---|---|---|
| Labor | Pat Hanlon | 5,186 | 59.2 | −2.5 |
| Liberal | Alan Edwards | 3,578 | 40.8 | +2.5 |
| Total formal votes | | 8,764 | 98.6 | 0.0 |
| Informal votes | | 127 | 1.4 | 0.0 |
| Turnout | | 8,891 | 88.4 | −5.8 |
| Labor hold | | Swing | −2.5 | |

=== Kedron ===
1956 Queensland state election: Kedron
| Party | Candidate | Votes | % | ±% |
|---|---|---|---|---|
| Labor | Eric Lloyd | 11,283 | 61.0 | −4.8 |
| Liberal | Albert Johnson | 7,215 | 39.0 | +4.8 |
| Total formal votes | | 18,498 | 98.8 | −0.2 |
| Informal votes | | 232 | 1.2 | +0.2 |
| Turnout | | 18,730 | 95.2 | −0.5 |
| Labor hold | | Swing | −4.8 | |

=== Kelvin Grove ===
1956 Queensland state election: Kelvin Grove
| Party | Candidate | Votes | % | ±% |
|---|---|---|---|---|
| Labor | Bert Turner | 5,355 | 54.3 | −7.6 |
| Liberal | Douglas Tooth | 4,506 | 45.7 | +7.6 |
| Total formal votes | | 9,861 | 98.5 | +0.1 |
| Informal votes | | 153 | 1.5 | −0.1 |
| Turnout | | 10,014 | 93.9 | −0.9 |
| Labor hold | | Swing | −7.6 | |

=== Keppel ===
1956 Queensland state election: Keppel
| Party | Candidate | Votes | % | ±% |
|---|---|---|---|---|
| Labor | Viv Cooper | 6,790 | 58.5 | +3.1 |
| Liberal | Tom Griffith | 4,820 | 41.5 | +41.5 |
| Total formal votes | | 11,610 | 99.2 | +0.2 |
| Informal votes | | 88 | 0.8 | −0.2 |
| Turnout | | 11,698 | 95.8 | +0.1 |
| Labor hold | | Swing | N/A | |

=== Kurilpa ===
1956 Queensland state election: Kurilpa
| Party | Candidate | Votes | % | ±% |
|---|---|---|---|---|
| Labor | Tom Moores | 4,785 | 57.3 | −5.4 |
| Liberal | Doug Berry | 3,573 | 42.7 | +12.0 |
| Total formal votes | | 8,358 | 98.4 | +0.3 |
| Informal votes | | 133 | 1.6 | −0.3 |
| Turnout | | 8,491 | 90.0 | −1.7 |
| Labor hold | | Swing | −8.7 | |

=== Landsborough ===
1956 Queensland state election: Landsborough
| Party | Candidate | Votes | % | ±% |
|---|---|---|---|---|
| Country | Frank Nicklin | 7,176 | 73.1 | −26.9 |
| Labor | Vincent Crosby | 2,645 | 26.9 | +26.9 |
| Total formal votes | | 9,821 | 98.9 | |
| Informal votes | | 106 | 1.1 | |
| Turnout | | 9,927 | 93.5 | |
| Country hold | | Swing | N/A | |

=== Lockyer ===
1956 Queensland state election: Lockyer
| Party | Candidate | Votes | % | ±% |
|---|---|---|---|---|
| Liberal | Gordon Chalk | unopposed | | |
| Liberal hold | | Swing | | |

=== Mackay ===
1956 Queensland state election: Mackay
| Party | Candidate | Votes | % | ±% |
|---|---|---|---|---|
| Labor | Fred Graham | 4,344 | 58.0 | −6.5 |
| Liberal | David Treacy | 2,924 | 39.0 | +3.5 |
| Independent | James Rowen | 223 | 3.0 | +3.0 |
| Total formal votes | | 7,491 | 98.9 | −0.4 |
| Informal votes | | 81 | 1.1 | +0.4 |
| Turnout | | 7,572 | 93.1 | −2.8 |
| Labor hold | | Swing | −5.0 | |

=== Mackenzie ===
1956 Queensland state election: Mackenzie
| Party | Candidate | Votes | % | ±% |
|---|---|---|---|---|
| Country | Nev Hewitt | 2,172 | 50.5 | +5.5 |
| Labor | Paddy Whyte | 2,126 | 49.5 | −5.5 |
| Total formal votes | | 4,298 | 99.1 | −0.1 |
| Informal votes | | 41 | 0.9 | +0.1 |
| Turnout | | 4,339 | 89.5 | −0.6 |
| Country gain from Labor | | Swing | +5.5 | |

=== Marodian ===
1956 Queensland state election: Marodian
| Party | Candidate | Votes | % | ±% |
|---|---|---|---|---|
| Country | James Heading | unopposed | | |
| Country hold | | Swing | | |

=== Maryborough ===
1956 Queensland state election: Maryborough
| Party | Candidate | Votes | % | ±% |
|---|---|---|---|---|
| Labor | Horace Davies | 6,488 | 66.2 | +10.2 |
| Country | James Dunn | 3,306 | 33.8 | +33.8 |
| Total formal votes | | 9,794 | 98.5 | +0.7 |
| Informal votes | | 152 | 1.5 | −0.7 |
| Turnout | | 9,946 | 96.1 | −1.4 |
| Labor hold | | Swing | N/A | |

=== Merthyr ===
1956 Queensland state election: Merthyr
| Party | Candidate | Votes | % | ±% |
|---|---|---|---|---|
| Labor | Bill Moore | 5,030 | 59.8 | −4.0 |
| Liberal | Sam Ramsden | 3,380 | 40.2 | +4.0 |
| Total formal votes | | 8,410 | 98.6 | −0.1 |
| Informal votes | | 120 | 1.4 | +0.1 |
| Turnout | | 8,530 | 91.0 | −2.9 |
| Labor hold | | Swing | −4.0 | |

=== Mirani ===
1956 Queensland state election: Mirani
| Party | Candidate | Votes | % | ±% |
|---|---|---|---|---|
| Country | Ernie Evans | 4,751 | 59.2 | +1.3 |
| Labor | Roger Scanlan | 3,268 | 40.8 | −1.3 |
| Total formal votes | | 8,019 | 98.8 | −0.2 |
| Informal votes | | 97 | 1.2 | +0.2 |
| Turnout | | 8,116 | 93.0 | −1.8 |
| Country hold | | Swing | +1.3 | |

=== Mount Coot-tha ===
1956 Queensland state election: Mount Coot-tha
| Party | Candidate | Votes | % | ±% |
|---|---|---|---|---|
| Liberal | Kenneth Morris | 8,932 | 62.4 | +4.5 |
| Labor | Vlad Darveniza | 5,386 | 37.6 | −4.5 |
| Total formal votes | | 14,318 | 98.8 | 0.0 |
| Informal votes | | 171 | 1.2 | 0.0 |
| Turnout | | 14,489 | 94.1 | −0.1 |
| Liberal hold | | Swing | +4.5 | |

=== Mount Gravatt ===
1956 Queensland state election: Mount Gravatt
| Party | Candidate | Votes | % | ±% |
|---|---|---|---|---|
| Labor | Felix Dittmer | 14,600 | 59.6 | −3.9 |
| Liberal | Eric Handy | 9,904 | 40.4 | +5.9 |
| Total formal votes | | 24,504 | 98.8 | +0.1 |
| Informal votes | | 286 | 1.2 | −0.1 |
| Turnout | | 24,790 | 94.2 | +0.6 |
| Labor hold | | Swing | −4.9 | |

=== Mourilyan ===
1956 Queensland state election: Mourilyan
| Party | Candidate | Votes | % | ±% |
|---|---|---|---|---|
| Labor | Peter Byrne | 4,468 | 59.5 | −7.8 |
| Country | Eric Fox | 2,872 | 38.2 | +8.6 |
| Communist | John Twaddle | 174 | 2.3 | −0.8 |
| Total formal votes | | 7,514 | 98.9 | −0.3 |
| Informal votes | | 86 | 1.1 | +0.3 |
| Turnout | | 7,600 | 93.4 | −0.7 |
| Labor hold | | Swing | −8.3 | |

=== Mulgrave ===
1956 Queensland state election: Mulgrave
| Party | Candidate | Votes | % | ±% |
|---|---|---|---|---|
| Labor | Charles English | 3,821 | 51.9 | +0.8 |
| Country | Bob Watson | 3,547 | 48.1 | −0.8 |
| Total formal votes | | 7,368 | 98.9 | +0.3 |
| Informal votes | | 80 | 1.1 | −0.3 |
| Turnout | | 7,448 | 93.4 | +0.5 |
| Labor hold | | Swing | +0.8 | |

=== Mundingburra ===
1956 Queensland state election: Mundingburra
| Party | Candidate | Votes | % | ±% |
|---|---|---|---|---|
| NQ Labor | Tom Aikens | 7,296 | 77.9 | +25.4 |
| Labor | John Brennan | 2,074 | 22.1 | −5.6 |
| Total formal votes | | 9,370 | 98.0 | −1.3 |
| Informal votes | | 189 | 2.0 | +1.3 |
| Turnout | | 9,559 | 93.6 | −1.2 |
| NQ Labor hold | | Swing | +15.5 | |

=== Murrumba ===
1956 Queensland state election: Murrumba
| Party | Candidate | Votes | % | ±% |
|---|---|---|---|---|
| Country | David Nicholson | 8,387 | 62.0 | +4.2 |
| Labor | Charles Myers | 5,137 | 38.0 | −4.2 |
| Total formal votes | | 13,524 | 98.6 | −0.6 |
| Informal votes | | 187 | 1.4 | +0.6 |
| Turnout | | 13,711 | 93.7 | +1.2 |
| Country hold | | Swing | +4.2 | |

=== Nash ===
1956 Queensland state election: Nash
| Party | Candidate | Votes | % | ±% |
|---|---|---|---|---|
| Labor | Greg Kehoe | 5,751 | 56.0 | −0.1 |
| Country | Max Hodges | 4,516 | 44.0 | +44.0 |
| Total formal votes | | 10,267 | 99.0 | −0.2 |
| Informal votes | | 106 | 1.0 | +0.2 |
| Turnout | | 10,373 | 95.2 | +1.0 |
| Labor hold | | Swing | −0.1 | |

=== Norman ===
1956 Queensland state election: Norman
| Party | Candidate | Votes | % | ±% |
|---|---|---|---|---|
| Labor | Bill Baxter | 6,052 | 56.1 | −3.1 |
| Liberal | George Regan | 4,738 | 43.9 | +3.1 |
| Total formal votes | | 10,790 | 98.9 | 0.0 |
| Informal votes | | 120 | 1.1 | 0.0 |
| Turnout | | 10,910 | 94.5 | +0.6 |
| Labor hold | | Swing | −3.1 | |

=== North Toowoomba ===
1956 Queensland state election: North Toowoomba
| Party | Candidate | Votes | % | ±% |
|---|---|---|---|---|
| Labor | Les Wood | 5,352 | 59.0 | −2.8 |
| Liberal | Sidney Webb | 3,718 | 41.0 | +2.8 |
| Total formal votes | | 9,070 | 98.9 | −0.2 |
| Informal votes | | 103 | 1.1 | +0.2 |
| Turnout | | 9,173 | 92.8 | −0.9 |
| Labor hold | | Swing | −2.8 | |

=== Nundah ===
1956 Queensland state election: Nundah
| Party | Candidate | Votes | % | ±% |
|---|---|---|---|---|
| Labor | Jim Hadley | 6,136 | 55.5 | −6.4 |
| Liberal | William Knox | 4,924 | 44.5 | +6.4 |
| Total formal votes | | 11,060 | 98.5 | −0.1 |
| Informal votes | | 166 | 1.5 | +0.1 |
| Turnout | | 11,226 | 94.8 | +0.3 |
| Labor hold | | Swing | −6.4 | |

=== Port Curtis ===
1956 Queensland state election: Port Curtis
| Party | Candidate | Votes | % | ±% |
|---|---|---|---|---|
| Labor | Jim Burrows | 6,092 | 64.5 | −3.3 |
| Country | Thomas Pulsford | 3,353 | 35.5 | +3.3 |
| Total formal votes | | 9,445 | 99.3 | +0.1 |
| Informal votes | | 68 | 0.7 | −0.1 |
| Turnout | | 9,513 | 94.6 | −0.7 |
| Labor hold | | Swing | −3.3 | |

=== Rockhampton ===
1956 Queensland state election: Rockhampton
| Party | Candidate | Votes | % | ±% |
|---|---|---|---|---|
| Labor | Mick Gardner | 4,445 | 50.0 | −11.8 |
| Liberal | Rex Pilbeam | 4,379 | 49.3 | +13.7 |
| Independent | Tom Kelly | 66 | 0.7 | −1.9 |
| Total formal votes | | 8,890 | 99.0 | 0.0 |
| Informal votes | | 86 | 1.0 | 0.0 |
| Turnout | | 8,976 | 95.5 | +0.4 |
| Labor hold | | Swing | −12.7 | |

=== Roma ===
1956 Queensland state election: Roma
| Party | Candidate | Votes | % | ±% |
|---|---|---|---|---|
| Labor | Alfred Dohring | 2,624 | 50.1 | −1.5 |
| Country | William Ewan | 2,610 | 49.9 | +1.5 |
| Total formal votes | | 5,234 | 99.4 | +0.1 |
| Informal votes | | 32 | 0.6 | −0.1 |
| Turnout | | 5,266 | 93.5 | −0.6 |
| Labor hold | | Swing | −1.5 | |

=== Sandgate ===
1956 Queensland state election: Sandgate
| Party | Candidate | Votes | % | ±% |
|---|---|---|---|---|
| Labor | Herbert Robinson | 9,562 | 56.6 | +0.7 |
| Liberal | Thomas Ahearn | 7,340 | 43.4 | −0.7 |
| Total formal votes | | 16,902 | 98.8 | +0.2 |
| Informal votes | | 210 | 1.2 | −0.2 |
| Turnout | | 17,112 | 93.3 | −0.7 |
| Labor hold | | Swing | +0.7 | |

=== Sherwood ===
1956 Queensland state election: Sherwood
| Party | Candidate | Votes | % | ±% |
|---|---|---|---|---|
| Liberal | John Herbert | 8,384 | 51.1 | +0.6 |
| Labor | Bart Lourigan | 7,424 | 45.2 | −3.5 |
| Independent | Margaret Fisher | 400 | 2.4 | +2.4 |
| Communist | Eugene Marshall | 206 | 1.3 | +1.3 |
| Total formal votes | | 16,414 | 97.0 | −1.8 |
| Informal votes | | 500 | 3.0 | +1.8 |
| Turnout | | 16,914 | 93.9 | −0.3 |
| Liberal hold | | Swing | +2.0 | |

=== Somerset ===
1956 Queensland state election: Somerset
| Party | Candidate | Votes | % | ±% |
|---|---|---|---|---|
| Labor | Alexander Skinner | 4,921 | 55.9 | +4.9 |
| Country | Nigel McConnel | 3,887 | 44.1 | −4.9 |
| Total formal votes | | 8,808 | 99.3 | +0.2 |
| Informal votes | | 63 | 0.7 | −0.2 |
| Turnout | | 8,871 | 94.7 | +0.8 |
| Labor hold | | Swing | +4.9 | |

=== South Brisbane ===
1956 Queensland state election: South Brisbane
| Party | Candidate | Votes | % | ±% |
|---|---|---|---|---|
| Labor | Vince Gair | 4,736 | 58.6 | −6.0 |
| Independent | Frank Roberts | 2,731 | 33.8 | +33.8 |
| Independent | Jack Noonan | 611 | 7.6 | +7.6 |
| Total formal votes | | 8,078 | 98.5 | 0.0 |
| Informal votes | | 123 | 1.5 | 0.0 |
| Turnout | | 8,201 | 91.9 | +1.5 |
| Labor hold | | Swing | N/A | |

=== Southport ===
1956 Queensland state election: Southport
| Party | Candidate | Votes | % | ±% |
|---|---|---|---|---|
| Country | Eric Gaven | 7,827 | 66.0 | +5.8 |
| Labor | William Belford | 4,027 | 34.0 | −5.8 |
| Total formal votes | | 11,854 | 99.4 | +0.1 |
| Informal votes | | 74 | 0.6 | −0.1 |
| Turnout | | 11,928 | 91.7 | −1.5 |
| Country hold | | Swing | +5.8 | |

=== Tablelands ===
1956 Queensland state election: Tablelands
| Party | Candidate | Votes | % | ±% |
|---|---|---|---|---|
| Labor | Harold Collins | 5,547 | 66.4 | +0.1 |
| Country | Clarence West | 2,803 | 33.6 | +2.7 |
| Total formal votes | | 8,350 | 98.9 | −0.2 |
| Informal votes | | 96 | 1.1 | +0.2 |
| Turnout | | 8,446 | 90.6 | −0.8 |
| Labor hold | | Swing | −1.3 | |

=== Toowong ===
1956 Queensland state election: Toowong
| Party | Candidate | Votes | % | ±% |
|---|---|---|---|---|
| Liberal | Alan Munro | unopposed | | |
| Liberal hold | | Swing | | |

=== Toowoomba ===
1956 Queensland state election: Toowoomba
| Party | Candidate | Votes | % | ±% |
|---|---|---|---|---|
| Labor | Jack Duggan | 5,979 | 63.0 | −3.1 |
| Liberal | Edward Hall | 3,512 | 37.0 | +3.1 |
| Total formal votes | | 9,491 | 98.7 | −0.5 |
| Informal votes | | 121 | 1.3 | +0.5 |
| Turnout | | 9,612 | 92.7 | −0.8 |
| Labor hold | | Swing | −3.1 | |

=== Townsville ===
1956 Queensland state election: Townsville
| Party | Candidate | Votes | % | ±% |
|---|---|---|---|---|
| Labor | George Keyatta | 2,982 | 46.9 | −11.5 |
| Liberal | Roy Pope | 2,301 | 36.2 | +9.8 |
| Independent | Jack Abercrombie | 915 | 14.4 | +2.3 |
| Communist | Hugh Fay | 156 | 2.5 | −0.6 |
| Total formal votes | | 4,354 | 99.1 | +0.4 |
| Informal votes | | 58 | 0.9 | −0.4 |
| Turnout | | 4,412 | 91.1 | −1.3 |
| Labor hold | | Swing | −10.6 | |

=== Warrego ===
1956 Queensland state election: Warrego
| Party | Candidate | Votes | % | ±% |
|---|---|---|---|---|
| Labor | John Dufficy | 3,248 | 67.7 | −32.3 |
| Country | William Mills | 1,550 | 32.3 | +32.3 |
| Total formal votes | | 4,798 | 98.4 | |
| Informal votes | | 76 | 1.6 | |
| Turnout | | 4,874 | 84.8 | |
| Labor hold | | Swing | N/A | |

=== Warwick ===
1956 Queensland state election: Warwick
| Party | Candidate | Votes | % | ±% |
|---|---|---|---|---|
| Country | Otto Madsen | 5,483 | 63.6 | −1.2 |
| Labor | Frank Drew | 3,137 | 36.4 | +1.2 |
| Total formal votes | | 8,620 | 99.1 | −0.1 |
| Informal votes | | 81 | 0.9 | +0.1 |
| Turnout | | 8,701 | 96.2 | +0.5 |
| Country hold | | Swing | −1.2 | |

=== Whitsunday ===
1956 Queensland state election: Whitsunday
| Party | Candidate | Votes | % | ±% |
|---|---|---|---|---|
| Country | Lloyd Roberts | 4,962 | 59.4 | +9.9 |
| Labor | George Burns | 3,395 | 40.6 | −4.2 |
| Total formal votes | | 8,357 | 98.6 | −0.6 |
| Informal votes | | 118 | 1.4 | +0.6 |
| Turnout | | 8,475 | 93.2 | −0.9 |
| Country hold | | Swing | +7.1 | |

=== Windsor ===
1956 Queensland state election: Windsor
| Party | Candidate | Votes | % | ±% |
|---|---|---|---|---|
| Labor | Tom Rasey | 5,459 | 56.3 | −3.9 |
| Liberal | Margaret Gordon | 4,240 | 43.7 | +3.9 |
| Total formal votes | | 9,699 | 98.8 | −0.1 |
| Informal votes | | 121 | 1.2 | +0.1 |
| Turnout | | 9,820 | 94.6 | +0.5 |
| Labor hold | | Swing | −3.9 | |

=== Wynnum ===
1956 Queensland state election: Wynnum
| Party | Candidate | Votes | % | ±% |
|---|---|---|---|---|
| Labor | Bill Gunn | 9,354 | 65.4 | −4.1 |
| Liberal | Charles Mengel | 4,954 | 34.6 | +4.1 |
| Total formal votes | | 14,308 | 98.7 | −0.2 |
| Informal votes | | 192 | 1.3 | +0.2 |
| Turnout | | 14,500 | 93.1 | −0.8 |
| Labor hold | | Swing | −4.1 | |

=== Yeronga ===
1956 Queensland state election: Yeronga
| Party | Candidate | Votes | % | ±% |
|---|---|---|---|---|
| Liberal | Winston Noble | 6,974 | 57.9 | +6.2 |
| Labor | Norman Stutz | 4,875 | 40.5 | −8.3 |
| Independent | Jim Dwyer | 191 | 1.6 | +1.6 |
| Total formal votes | | 12,040 | 99.0 | +0.2 |
| Informal votes | | 116 | 1.0 | −0.2 |
| Turnout | | 12,156 | 94.1 | −1.2 |
| Liberal hold | | Swing | +7.5 | |

== See also ==
- 1956 Queensland state election
- Candidates of the Queensland state election, 1956
- Members of the Queensland Legislative Assembly, 1956-1957
