= Candidates of the 1957 Queensland state election =

The 1957 Queensland state election was held on 3 August 1957.

Since the previous election in 1956, the Labor Party had split, with all but one of the ministry and a number of supporters forming the separate Queensland Labor Party.

== By-elections ==
- On 8 December 1956, Pat Hanlon (Labor) was elected to succeed Leonard Eastment (Labor), who had died on 29 July 1956, as the member for Ithaca.

== Retiring Members ==
- Note: Gregory QLP MLA George Devries nominated for re-election, but died before polling day; the election for Gregory was thus postponed to 5 October 1957.

=== Country ===
- Tom Plunkett MLA (Darlington)

== Candidates ==
Sitting members at the time of the election are shown in bold text.

Electorate	Held by	Labor candidate	Coalition candidate	QLP candidate	Other candidates
Aubigny	Country		**Jim Sparkes** (CP)		
Balonne	Labor	**John Taylor**	Eddie Beardmore (CP)	Henry Bunton	
Barambah	Country		**Joh Bjelke-Petersen** (CP)	Thomas O'Neill	
Barcoo	Labor	**Ned Davis**	Raymond Paynter (CP)	Stanley Barry	
Baroona	Labor	Norman Buchan	Robert Thomasson (Lib)	**Bill Power**	
Belyando	Labor	John Williams	Clarence Whyte (CP)	**Tom Foley**	
Bremer	Labor	**Jim Donald**	George Groth (Lib)	Frank Corbutt	
Brisbane	Labor	**Johnno Mann**	Roger Moore (Lib)	Daniel Casey	
Bulimba	Labor	Jack Houston	Bill Lickiss (Lib)	**Bob Gardner**	
Bundaberg	Labor	William Elson-Green	Thomas Pulsford (CP)	**Ted Walsh**	
Buranda	Labor	**Dick Brown**	Keith Hooper (Lib)	Michael Lyons	John Handasyde (Ind)
Burdekin	Independent	John Grafton		Oliver Andersen	**Arthur Coburn** (Ind)
Cairns	Labor	**Watty Wallace**	Clement Cummings (CP)	James Bidner	
Callide	Country		**Vince Jones** (CP)		
Carnarvon	Labor	Douglas Gow	Fred Rogers (CP)	**Paul Hilton**	
Carpentaria	Labor	Alec Inch	William Aplin (CP)	**Norm Smith**	
Charters Towers	Labor	Robert Davies	Kieth Siemon (Lib)	**Arthur Jones**	
Chermside	Liberal	Leslie Sampson	**Alex Dewar** (Lib)	John Parry	
Clayfield	Liberal		**Harold Taylor** (Lib)		James Ryan (Ind)
Condamine	Labor	William Eggington	Stewart Keys (CP)	**Les Diplock**	
Cook	Labor	Seymour Chataway	Carlisle Wordsworth (CP)	**Bunny Adair**	
Cooroora	Country	Ralph Smith	**David Low** (CP)		
Coorparoo	Liberal	Bernard Ouston	**Thomas Hiley** (Lib)		
Cunningham	Country		**Alan Fletcher** (CP)		Leslie Ott (Ind)
Darlington	Country	Charles Knoll	Leslie Harrison (CP)		Henry Longfield (Ind); Michael Smith (Ind)
Fassifern	Country		**Alf Muller** (CP)	Kenneth Rawle	
Fitzroy	Labor	**Jim Clark**	Gordon Dunn (Lib)	John Norton	
Flinders	Labor	**Frank Forde**	Bill Longeran (CP)	Bob Katter	Charles Corney (Ind)
Fortitude Valley	Labor	Jack Egerton	Bob Windsor (Lib)	**Mick Brosnan**	
Gregory	Labor	unknown	Wally Rae (CP)	**George Devries** (died)	
Gregory	Labor	Jack Duggan	Wally Rae (CP)	Keith Smith	
Haughton	Labor	Vivien Owens	William Clayton (CP)	**Colin McCathie**	
Hinchinbrook	Labor	**Cecil Jesson**	John Row (CP)	John Argaet	Francis Curro (Ind)
Ipswich	Labor	**Ivor Marsden**	Wylie Gibbs (Lib)	Robert Johnstone	
Isis	Country		**Jack Pizzey** (CP)	Edward McDonnell	
Ithaca	Labor	**Pat Hanlon**	Alan Edwards (Lib)	Anthony Machin	
Kedron	Labor	**Eric Lloyd**	Joseph Harris (Lib)	Clive Uhr	
Kelvin Grove	Labor	**Bert Turner**	Douglas Tooth (Lib)	John Dawson	
Keppel	Labor	Merv Thackeray	Tom Griffith (Lib)	**Viv Cooper**	Rex Pilbeam (Ind)
Kurilpa	Labor	Myles Kane	Peter Connolly (Lib)	**Tom Moores**	George Fry (Ind)
Landsborough	Country		**Frank Nicklin** (CP)		
Lockyer	Liberal		**Gordon Chalk** (Lib)		Jim Dwyer (Ind)
Mackay	Labor	**Fred Graham**	William Field (Lib)	Joseph Griffin	
Mackenzie	Country	William James	**Nev Hewitt** (CP)	John Thomas Cook	
Marodian	Country	William Weir	**James Heading** (CP)		
Maryborough	Labor	**Horace Davies**	James Dunn (CP)	Clement Gott	
Merthyr	Labor	Tom Campbell	Sam Ramsden (Lib)	**Bill Moore**	
Mirani	Country	James Chataway	**Ernie Evans** (CP)	Waller O'Grady	
Mount Coot-tha	Liberal	Desmond Raven	**Kenneth Morris** (Lib)	John Lynch	
Mount Gravatt	Labor	**Felix Dittmer**	Graham Hart (Lib)	Charles Edwards	Harold Boone (Ind)
Mourilyan	Labor	**Peter Byrne**	Edmund Webb (CP)	Alfred Drew	Cecil Evans (Ind)
Mulgrave	Labor	Leslie Trembath	Bob Watson (CP)	**Charles English**	
Mundingburra	NQ Labor	Jim Mahony			**Tom Aikens*** (NQLP); Gordon Evans (Ind)
Murrumba	Country	Bertram Krause	**David Nicholson** (CP)	Michael Ryan	
Nash	Labor	George Hooper	Max Hodges (CP)	**Greg Kehoe**	
Norman	Labor	**Bill Baxter**	George Regan (Lib)	Norman Tacey	
North Toowoomba	Labor	**Les Wood**	Herbert Yeates (Lib)	Francis Bowdler	
Nundah	Labor	Dudley Ryder	William Knox (Lib)	**Jim Hadley**	
Port Curtis	Labor	**Jim Burrows**	Colin Wilson (CP)	Samuel Andrewartha	
Rockhampton	Labor	James Fraser	James Marshall (Lib)	**Mick Gardner**	Thomas Kelly (Ind); Rex Pilbeam (Ind)
Roma	Labor	William Hay	William Ewan (CP)	**Alfred Dohring**	James Clarke (Ind)
Sandgate	Labor	Harry Dean	Thomas Ahearn (Lib)	**Herbert Robinson**	
Sherwood	Liberal	Doug Sherrington	**John Herbert** (Lib)	Harry Wright	
Somerset	Labor	Evan Marginson	Harold Richter (CP)	**Alexander Skinner**	
South Brisbane	Labor	Tom Doyle	William Henry (Lib)	**Vince Gair**	
Southport	Country	William Bedford	**Eric Gaven** (CP)		
Tablelands	Labor	Sidney Tullipan	Tom Gilmore (CP)	**Harold Collins**	
Toowong	Liberal		**Alan Munro** (Lib)		
Toowoomba	Labor	**Jack Duggan**	Mervyn Anderson (Lib)	Thomas McCawley	Vera Lacaze (Ind)
Townsville	Labor	**George Keyatta**	Roy Pope (Lib)	Lionel Tomlins	
Warrego	Labor	**John Dufficy**	Arnold White (CP)	John Glynn	
Warwick	Country		**Otto Madsen** (CP)	George Wilkinson	
Whitsunday	Country	Ralph Staples	**Lloyd Roberts** (CP)	Bernard Lewis	
Windsor	Labor	Kenneth Kemshead	Ray Smith (Lib)	**Tom Rasey**	
Wynnum	Labor	**Bill Gunn**	Peter McAdam (Lib)	James Pendergast	William St George-Grambauer (Ind)
Yeronga	Liberal	Roy Dent	**Winston Noble** (Lib)	William Quaill	

== See also ==
- 1957 Queensland state election
- Members of the Queensland Legislative Assembly, 1956–1957
- Members of the Queensland Legislative Assembly, 1957–1960
- List of political parties in Australia
