= Candidates of the 1956 Queensland state election =

The 1956 Queensland state election was held on 19 May 1956.

== By-elections ==
- On 28 November 1953, Horace Davies (Labor) was elected to succeed David Farrell (Labor), who had died on 17 August 1953, as the member for Maryborough.
- On 12 March 1955, Frank Forde (Labor) was elected to succeed Ernest Riordan (Labor), who had died on 9 December 1954, as the member for Flinders.

== Retiring Members ==
=== Labor ===
- Thomas Crowley MLA (Cairns)
- James Larcombe MLA (Rockhampton)

=== Liberal ===
- Tom Kerr MLA (Sherwood)

== Candidates ==
Sitting members at the time of the election are shown in bold text.

| Electorate | Held by | Labor candidate | Coalition candidate | Other candidates |
|---|---|---|---|---|
| Aubiugny | Country | William Alexander | **Jim Sparkes** (CP) | |
| Balonne | Labor | **John Taylor** | Eric McCorkell (CP) | |
| Barambah | Country | | **Joh Bjelke-Petersen** (CP) | |
| Barcoo | Labor | **Ned Davis** | Wally Rae (CP) | |
| Baroona | Labor | **Bill Power** | Robert Thomasson (Lib) | Kevin Loughlin (CPA) |
| Belyando | Labor | **Tom Foley** | Timothy Donnelly (CP) | |
| Bremer | Labor | **Jim Donald** | George Groth (Lib) | |
| Brisbane | Labor | **Johnno Mann** | Roger Moore (Lib) | Peter Day (Ind) |
| Bulimba | Labor | **Bob Gardner** | John Mills (Lib) | Herbert Ricketts (Ind) |
| Bundaberg | Labor | **Ted Walsh** | | |
| Buranda | Labor | **Dick Brown** | Keith Hooper (Lib) | |
| Burdekin | Independent | Henry Skinner | | **Arthur Coburn*** (Ind); Howard Connors (CPA) |
| Cairns | Labor | Watty Wallace | Harold Mulry (CP) | Henry Smallwood (Ind) |
| Callide | Country | Eric Willis | **Vince Jones** (CP) | |
| Carnarvon | Labor | **Paul Hilton** | Fred Rogers (CP) | |
| Carpentaria | Labor | **Norm Smith** | William Aplin (CP) | |
| Charters Towers | Labor | **Arthur Jones** | Jan Karlik (Lib) | |
| Chermside | Liberal | Dudley Ryder | **Alex Dewar** (Lib) | |
| Clayfield | Liberal | | **Harold Taylor** (Lib) | James Ryan (Ind) |
| Condamine | Labor | **Les Diplock** | Stewart Keys (CP) | |
| Cook | Labor | **Bunny Adair** | John Crossland (CP) | |
| Cooroora | Country | Geoffrey Arnell | **David Low** (CP) | |
| Coorparoo | Liberal | Geoffrey Maher | **Thomas Hiley** (Lib) | |
| Cunningham | Country | John McCafferty | **Alan Fletcher** (CP) | |
| Darlington | Country | Charles Knoll | **Tom Plunkett** (CP) | |
| Fassifern | Country | | **Alf Muller** (CP) | |
| Fitzroy | Labor | **Jim Clark** | Gerard Davies (Lib) | Eric Browne (CPA) |
| Flinders | Labor | **Frank Forde** | Bill Longeran (CP) | |
| Fortitude Valley | Labor | **Mick Brosnan** | Bob Windsor (Lib) | Jim Henderson (CPA) |
| Gregory | Labor | **George Devries** | Robert Campbell (CP) | |
| Haughton | Labor | **Colin McCathie** | Edwin Pearse (Lib) | |
| Hinchinbrook | Labor | **Cecil Jesson** | Francis Curro (Lib) | |
| Ipswich | Labor | **Ivor Marsden** | Wylie Gibbs (Lib) | Mev Welsby (CPA) |
| Isis | Country | Hylton Salter | **Jack Pizzey** (CP) | |
| Ithaca | Labor | **Leonard Eastment** | Alan Edwards (Lib) | |
| Kedron | Labor | **Eric Lloyd** | Albert Johnson (Lib) | |
| Kelvin Grove | Labor | **Bert Turner** | Douglas Tooth (Lib) | |
| Keppel | Labor | **Viv Cooper** | Tom Griffith (Lib) | |
| Kurilpa | Labor | **Tom Moores** | Doug Berry (Lib) | |
| Landsborough | Country | Vincent Crosby | **Frank Nicklin** (CP) | |
| Lockyer | Liberal | | **Gordon Chalk** (Lib) | |
| Mackay | Labor | **Fred Graham** | David Treacy (Lib) | James Rowen (Ind) |
| Mackenzie | Labor | **Paddy Whyte** | Nev Hewitt (CP) | |
| Marodian | Country | | **James Heading** (CP) | |
| Maryborough | Labor | **Horace Davies** | James Dunn (CP) | |
| Merthyr | Labor | **Bill Moore** | Sam Ramsden (Lib) | |
| Mirani | Country | Roger Scanlan | **Ernie Evans** (CP) | |
| Mount Coot-tha | Liberal | Vlad Darveniza | **Kenneth Morris** (Lib) | |
| Mount Gravatt | Labor | **Felix Dittmer** | Eric Handy (Lib) | |
| Mourilyan | Labor | **Peter Byrne** | Eric Fox (CP) | John Twaddle (CPA) |
| Mulgrave | Labor | **Charles English** | Bob Watson (CP) | |
| Mundingburra | NQ Labor | John Brennan | | **Tom Aikens** (NQLP) |
| Murrumba | Country | Charles Myers | **David Nicholson** (CP) | |
| Nash | Labor | **Greg Kehoe** | Max Hodges (CP) | |
| Norman | Labor | **Bill Baxter** | George Regan (Lib) | |
| North Toowoomba | Labor | **Les Wood** | Sidney Webb (Lib) | |
| Nundah | Labor | Jim Hadley | William Knox (Lib) | |
| Port Curtis | Labor | **Jim Burrows** | Thomas Pulsford (CP) | |
| Rockhampton | Labor | Mick Gardner | Rex Pilbeam (Lib) | Tom Kelly (Ind) |
| Roma | Labor | **Alfred Dohring** | William Ewan (CP) | |
| Sandgate | Labor | **Herbert Robinson** | Thomas Ahearn (Lib) | |
| Sherwood | Liberal | Bart Lourigan | John Herbert (Lib) | Margaret Fisher (Ind); Eugene Marshall (CPA) |
| Somerset | Labor | **Alexander Skinner** | Nigel McConnel (CP) | |
| South Brisbane | Labor | **Vince Gair** | | Jack Noonan (Ind); **Frank Roberts** (Ind) |
| Southport | Country | William Belford | **Eric Gaven** (CP) | |
| Tablelands | Labor | **Harold Collins** | Clarence West (CP) | |
| Toowong | Liberal | | **Alan Munro** (Lib) | |
| Toowoomba | Labor | **Jack Duggan** | Edward Hall (Lib) | |
| Townsville | Labor | **George Keyatta** | Roy Pope (Lib) | Jack Abercrombie (Ind); Hugh Fay (CPA) |
| Warrego | Labor | **John Dufficy** | William Mills (CP) | |
| Warwick | Country | Frank Drew | **Otto Madsen** (CP) | |
| Whitsunday | Country | George Burns | **Lloyd Roberts** (CP) | |
| Windsor | Labor | **Tom Rasey** | Margaret Gordon (Lib) | |
| Wynnum | Labor | **Bill Gunn** | Charles Mengel (Lib) | |
| Yeronga | Liberal | Norman Stutz | **Winston Noble** (Lib) | Jim Dwyer (Ind) |

== See also ==
- 1956 Queensland state election
- Members of the Queensland Legislative Assembly, 1953–1956
- Members of the Queensland Legislative Assembly, 1956–1957
- List of political parties in Australia
