= Electoral results for the district of Brisbane (Queensland) =

Queensland, Australia, district election results

This is a list of electoral results for the electoral district of Brisbane in Queensland state elections.

== Members for Brisbane ==
| Member | Party | Term |
|---|---|---|
| Mick Kirwan | Labor | 1912–1932 |
| Robert Funnell | Labor | 1932–1936 |
| Johnno Mann | Labor | 1936–1969 |
| Brian Davis | Labor | 1969–1974 |
| Harold Lowes | Liberal | 1974–1977 |

== Election results ==
=== Elections in the 1970s ===
1974 Queensland state election: Brisbane
| Party | Candidate | Votes | % | ±% |
|---|---|---|---|---|
| Labor | Brian Davis | 4,523 | 48.3 | −6.7 |
| Liberal | Harold Lowes | 4,454 | 47.6 | +19.3 |
| Queensland Labor | Viliam Simek | 387 | 4.1 | −7.0 |
| Total formal votes | | 9,364 | 97.5 | +0.9 |
| Informal votes | | 243 | 2.5 | −0.9 |
| Turnout | | 9,607 | 82.8 | −7.4 |
Two-party-preferred result
| Liberal | Harold Lowes | 4,796 | 51.2 | +10.9 |
| Labor | Brian Davis | 4,568 | 48.8 | −10.9 |
| Liberal gain from Labor | | Swing | +10.9 | |

1972 Queensland state election: Brisbane
| Party | Candidate | Votes | % | ±% |
|---|---|---|---|---|
| Labor | Brian Davis | 5,414 | 55.0 | −1.2 |
| Liberal | Harold Lowes | 2,785 | 28.3 | −1.4 |
| Queensland Labor | Kenneth Walpole | 1,088 | 11.1 | −3.0 |
| Independent | Llewellyn Davies | 549 | 5.7 | +5.7 |
| Total formal votes | | 9,836 | 96.6 | |
| Informal votes | | 342 | 3.4 | |
| Turnout | | 10,178 | 90.2 | |
Two-party-preferred result
| Labor | Brian Davis | 5,873 | 59.7 | 0.0 |
| Liberal | Harold Lowes | 3,963 | 40.3 | 0.0 |
| Labor hold | | Swing | 0.0 | |

=== Elections in the 1960s ===
1969 Queensland state election: Brisbane
| Party | Candidate | Votes | % | ±% |
|---|---|---|---|---|
| Labor | Brian Davis | 4,162 | 56.2 | +0.3 |
| Liberal | Neville Jackson | 2,200 | 29.7 | −2.8 |
| Queensland Labor | Patrick Hallinan | 1,040 | 14.1 | +2.5 |
| Total formal votes | | 7,402 | 96.1 | 0.0 |
| Informal votes | | 303 | 3.9 | 0.0 |
| Turnout | | 7,705 | 84.7 | −1.3 |
Two-party-preferred result
| Labor | Brian Davis | 4,355 | 58.8 | +0.8 |
| Liberal | Neville Jackson | 3,047 | 41.2 | −0.8 |
| Labor hold | | Swing | +0.8 | |

1966 Queensland state election: Brisbane
| Party | Candidate | Votes | % | ±% |
|---|---|---|---|---|
| Labor | John Mann | 4,726 | 55.9 | +0.8 |
| Liberal | Brian Cahill | 2,749 | 32.5 | −0.7 |
| Queensland Labor | John O'Connell | 983 | 11.6 | 0.0 |
| Total formal votes | | 8,458 | 96.1 | −0.6 |
| Informal votes | | 347 | 3.9 | +0.6 |
| Turnout | | 8,805 | 86.0 | −3.6 |
Two-party-preferred result
| Labor | John Mann | 4,909 | 58.0 | +0.7 |
| Liberal | Brian Cahill | 3,549 | 42.0 | −0.7 |
| Labor hold | | Swing | +0.7 | |

1963 Queensland state election: Brisbane
| Party | Candidate | Votes | % | ±% |
|---|---|---|---|---|
| Labor | John Mann | 5,110 | 55.1 | +3.5 |
| Liberal | James Rowan | 3,081 | 33.2 | +3.4 |
| Queensland Labor | Jack O'Connell | 1,078 | 11.6 | −6.9 |
| Total formal votes | | 9,269 | 96.7 | −1.4 |
| Informal votes | | 318 | 3.3 | +1.4 |
| Turnout | | 9,587 | 89.6 | +3.7 |
Two-party-preferred result
| Labor | John Mann | 5,311 | 57.3 | |
| Liberal | James Rowan | 3,958 | 42.7 | |
| Labor hold | | Swing | N/A | |

1960 Queensland state election: Brisbane
| Party | Candidate | Votes | % | ±% |
|---|---|---|---|---|
| Labor | John Mann | 5,511 | 51.6 | +13.5 |
| Liberal | Jim Rowan | 3,180 | 29.8 | −1.4 |
| Queensland Labor | Lionel Orreal | 1,979 | 18.5 | −12.2 |
| Total formal votes | | 10,670 | 98.1 | |
| Informal votes | | 201 | 1.9 | |
| Turnout | | 10,871 | 85.9 | |
| Labor hold | | Swing | +8.4 | |

=== Elections in the 1950s ===
1957 Queensland state election: Brisbane
| Party | Candidate | Votes | % | ±% |
|---|---|---|---|---|
| Labor | John Mann | 2,744 | 38.4 | −21.6 |
| Queensland Labor | Daniel Casey | 2,307 | 32.3 | +32.3 |
| Liberal | Roger Moore | 2,087 | 29.2 | −5.8 |
| Total formal votes | | 7,138 | 98.0 | −0.2 |
| Informal votes | | 146 | 2.0 | +0.2 |
| Turnout | | 7,284 | 90.8 | +4.0 |
| Labor hold | | Swing | −8.8 | |

1956 Queensland state election: Brisbane
| Party | Candidate | Votes | % | ±% |
|---|---|---|---|---|
| Labor | John Mann | 4,402 | 60.0 | −15.2 |
| Liberal | Roger Moore | 2,569 | 35.0 | +35.0 |
| Independent | Peter Day | 369 | 5.0 | +5.0 |
| Total formal votes | | 7,340 | 98.2 | |
| Informal votes | | 137 | 1.8 | |
| Turnout | | 7,477 | 86.8 | |
| Labor hold | | Swing | N/A | |

1953 Queensland state election: Brisbane
| Party | Candidate | Votes | % | ±% |
|---|---|---|---|---|
| Labor | John Mann | 6,239 | 75.2 | +16.4 |
| Social Credit | Colin Nonmus | 1,598 | 19.3 | +19.3 |
| Communist | Laura Hansen | 457 | 5.5 | +5.5 |
| Total formal votes | | 8,294 | 95.3 | −3.4 |
| Informal votes | | 407 | 4.7 | +3.4 |
| Turnout | | 8,701 | 89.5 | +0.4 |
| Labor hold | | Swing | N/A | |

1950 Queensland state election: Brisbane
| Party | Candidate | Votes | % | ±% |
|---|---|---|---|---|
| Labor | John Mann | 5,942 | 58.8 | |
| Liberal | John Herbert | 4,159 | 41.2 | |
| Total formal votes | | 10,101 | 98.7 | |
| Informal votes | | 134 | 1.3 | |
| Turnout | | 10,235 | 89.1 | |
| Labor hold | | Swing | | |

=== Elections in the 1940s ===
1947 Queensland state election: Brisbane
| Party | Candidate | Votes | % | ±% |
|---|---|---|---|---|
| Labor | John Mann | 4,457 | 51.0 | −7.4 |
| People's Party | Maurice Mitchell | 3,310 | 37.8 | −3.8 |
| Independent Labor | Charles Coward | 981 | 11.2 | +11.2 |
| Total formal votes | | 8,748 | 97.9 | +0.3 |
| Informal votes | | 185 | 2.1 | −0.3 |
| Turnout | | 8,933 | 86.9 | +1.5 |
| Labor hold | | Swing | −1.0 | |

1944 Queensland state election: Brisbane
| Party | Candidate | Votes | % | ±% |
|---|---|---|---|---|
| Labor | John Mann | 4,774 | 58.4 | +1.0 |
| People's Party | George Regan | 3,396 | 41.6 | +7.1 |
| Total formal votes | | 8,170 | 97.6 | 0.0 |
| Informal votes | | 200 | 2.4 | 0.0 |
| Turnout | | 8,370 | 85.4 | −1.4 |
| Labor hold | | Swing | −4.0 | |

1941 Queensland state election: Brisbane
| Party | Candidate | Votes | % | ±% |
|---|---|---|---|---|
| Labor | John Mann | 4,749 | 57.4 | −8.6 |
| United Australia | Neville Fogerty | 2,856 | 34.5 | +0.5 |
| Communist | Claude Jones | 670 | 8.1 | +8.1 |
| Total formal votes | | 8,275 | 97.6 | −0.7 |
| Informal votes | | 199 | 2.4 | +0.7 |
| Turnout | | 8,474 | 86.8 | −1.4 |
| Labor hold | | Swing | −3.6 | |

=== Elections in the 1930s ===
1938 Queensland state election: Brisbane
| Party | Candidate | Votes | % | ±% |
|---|---|---|---|---|
| Labor | John Mann | 5,704 | 66.0 | +1.6 |
| United Australia | Benjamin White | 2,933 | 34.0 | +34.0 |
| Total formal votes | | 8,637 | 98.3 | +1.1 |
| Informal votes | | 146 | 1.7 | −1.1 |
| Turnout | | 8,637 | 88.2 | +3.9 |
| Labor hold | | Swing | N/A | |

1936 Brisbane state by-election
| Party | Candidate | Votes | % | ±% |
|---|---|---|---|---|
| Labor | Johnno Mann | 4,726 | 65.5 | +1.1 |
| Independent | Edwyn Roper | 1,720 | 23.8 | +23.8 |
| Social Credit | Charles Martin | 770 | 10.7 | −2.4 |
| Total formal votes | | 7,216 | 98.5 | +1.3 |
| Informal votes | | 113 | 1.5 | −1.3 |
| Turnout | | 7,329 | 74.2 | −10.1 |
| Labor hold | | Swing | N/A | |

1935 Queensland state election: Brisbane
| Party | Candidate | Votes | % | ±% |
|---|---|---|---|---|
| Labor | Robert Funnell | 5,500 | 64.4 | |
| Independent Labor | Henry Shea | 1,918 | 22.5 | |
| Social Credit | Charles Martin | 1,118 | 13.1 | |
| Total formal votes | | 8,536 | 97.2 | |
| Informal votes | | 244 | 2.8 | |
| Turnout | | 8,780 | 84.3 | |
| Labor hold | | Swing | | |

1932 Queensland state election: Brisbane
| Party | Candidate | Votes | % | ±% |
|---|---|---|---|---|
| Labor | Robert Funnell | 5,479 | 59.9 | |
| CPNP | George Mocatta | 2,839 | 31.0 | |
| Lang Labor | Herbert Carrigan | 400 | 4.4 | |
| Independent | Marion Steel | 180 | 2.0 | |
| Queensland Party | William Allen | 172 | 1.9 | |
| Total formal votes | | 9,142 | 97.1 | |
| Informal votes | | 277 | 2.9 | |
| Turnout | | 9,419 | 87.7 | |
| Labor hold | | Swing | | |

=== Elections in the 1920s ===
1929 Queensland state election: Brisbane
| Party | Candidate | Votes | % | ±% |
|---|---|---|---|---|
| Labor | Mick Kirwan | 2,128 | 47.1 | −12.7 |
| CPNP | Thomas Thatcher | 2,080 | 46.0 | +5.8 |
| Communist | John Miles | 219 | 4.9 | +4.9 |
| Independent | Fred O'Keefe | 91 | 2.0 | +2.0 |
| Total formal votes | | 4,508 | 97.2 | −1.2 |
| Informal votes | | 138 | 2.8 | +1.2 |
| Turnout | | 4,646 | 81.5 | +3.0 |
Two-party-preferred result
| Labor | Mick Kirwan | 2,154 | 50.3 | −9.5 |
| CPNP | Thomas Thatcher | 2,126 | 49.7 | +9.5 |
| Labor hold | | Swing | −9.5 | |

1926 Queensland state election: Brisbane
| Party | Candidate | Votes | % | ±% |
|---|---|---|---|---|
| Labor | Mick Kirwan | 2,723 | 59.8 | 0.0 |
| CPNP | Fred O'Keefe | 1,832 | 40.2 | 0.0 |
| Total formal votes | | 4,555 | 98.4 | −0.6 |
| Informal votes | | 72 | 1.6 | +0.6 |
| Turnout | | 4,627 | 78.5 | +4.5 |
| Labor hold | | Swing | 0.0 | |

1923 Queensland state election: Brisbane
| Party | Candidate | Votes | % | ±% |
|---|---|---|---|---|
| Labor | Mick Kirwan | 3,099 | 59.8 | +5.8 |
| United | James Crawford | 2,087 | 40.2 | −5.8 |
| Total formal votes | | 5,186 | 99.0 | +0.5 |
| Informal votes | | 53 | 1.0 | −0.5 |
| Turnout | | 5,239 | 74.0 | +5.0 |
| Labor hold | | Swing | +5.8 | |

1920 Queensland state election: Brisbane
| Party | Candidate | Votes | % | ±% |
|---|---|---|---|---|
| Labor | Mick Kirwan | 2,971 | 54.0 | −6.6 |
| National | Patrick Currie | 2,531 | 46.0 | +6.6 |
| Total formal votes | | 5,502 | 98.5 | +0.6 |
| Informal votes | | 84 | 1.5 | −0.6 |
| Turnout | | 5,586 | 69.0 | |
| Labor hold | | Swing | −6.6 | |

=== Elections in the 1910s ===
1918 Queensland state election: Brisbane
| Party | Candidate | Votes | % | ±% |
|---|---|---|---|---|
| Labor | Mick Kirwan | 3,273 | 60.6 | −0.2 |
| National | Norman Warrall | 2,126 | 39.4 | +0.2 |
| Total formal votes | | 5,399 | 97.9 | +0.7 |
| Informal votes | | 116 | 2.1 | −0.7 |
| Turnout | | 5,515 | 61.7 | −20.7 |
| Labor hold | | Swing | −0.2 | |

1915 Queensland state election: Brisbane
| Party | Candidate | Votes | % | ±% |
|---|---|---|---|---|
| Labor | Mick Kirwan | 2,529 | 60.8 | +10.4 |
| Liberal | Charles Jenkinson | 1,632 | 39.2 | −10.4 |
| Total formal votes | | 4,161 | 97.2 | −1.7 |
| Informal votes | | 118 | 2.8 | +1.7 |
| Turnout | | 4,279 | 82.4 | +9.1 |
| Labor hold | | Swing | +10.4 | |

1912 Queensland state election: Brisbane
| Party | Candidate | Votes | % | ±% |
|---|---|---|---|---|
| Labor | Mick Kirwan | 2,281 | 50.4 | |
| Liberal | Edward Forrest | 2,249 | 49.6 | |
| Total formal votes | | 4,530 | 98.9 | |
| Informal votes | | 51 | 1.1 | |
| Turnout | | 4,581 | 73.3 | |
| Labor gain from Liberal | | Swing | | |
