= Members of the Queensland Legislative Assembly, 1956–1957 =

This is a list of members of the 34th Legislative Assembly of Queensland from 19 May 1956 to 3 August 1957, as elected at the 1956 state election held on 19 May 1956.

The term was cut short by a split within the governing Labor Party—the Premier, Vince Gair, and all but one of his ministers were expelled from the Party on 24 April 1957. He and 25 members of Parliament formed the Queensland Labor Party on 26 April, whilst the remaining Labor members became the main Opposition party and elected Jack Duggan as leader. Gair continued as Premier but could not obtain supply from the Parliament, so an election was called.

Name	Party	Electorate	Term in office
Bunny Adair	ALP/QLP	Cook	1953–1969
Tom Aikens	NQLP	Mundingburra	1944–1977
Bill Baxter	Labor	Norman	1953–1966
Joh Bjelke-Petersen	Country	Barambah	1947–1987
Mick Brosnan	ALP/QLP	Fortitude Valley	1950–1957
Dick Brown	Labor	Buranda	1947–1957
Jim Burrows	Labor	Port Curtis	1947–1963
Peter Byrne	Labor	Mourilyan	1950–1969
Gordon Chalk	Liberal	Lockyer	1947–1976
Jim Clark	Labor	Fitzroy	1935–1960
Arthur Coburn	Independent	Burdekin	1950–1969
Hon Harold Collins	ALP/QLP	Tablelands	1935–1957
Viv Cooper	ALP/QLP	Keppel	1952–1957
Horace Davies	Labor	Maryborough	1953–1971
Ned Davis	Labor	Barcoo	1943–1961
Hon George Devries^{[2]}	ALP/QLP	Gregory	1941–1957
Alex Dewar	Liberal	Chermside	1950–1969
Hon Les Diplock	ALP/QLP	Condamine	1953–1972
Felix Dittmer	Labor	Mount Gravatt	1950–1957
Alfred Dohring	ALP/QLP	Roma	1953–1957
Jim Donald	Labor	Bremer	1946–1969
John Dufficy	Labor	Warrego	1951–1969
Hon Jack Duggan	Labor	Toowoomba	1935–1957, 1958–1969
Leonard Eastment^{[1]}	Labor	Ithaca	1952–1956
Charles English	ALP/QLP	Mulgrave	1953–1957
Ernie Evans	Country	Mirani	1947–1965
Alan Fletcher	Country	Cunningham	1953–1974
Hon Tom Foley	ALP/Independent/QLP	Belyando	1919–1960
Hon Frank Forde	Labor	Flinders	1917–1922, 1955–1957
Hon Vince Gair	ALP/QLP	South Brisbane	1932–1960
Mick Gardner	ALP/Independent/QLP	Rockhampton	1956–1960
Bob Gardner	ALP/QLP	Bulimba	1950–1957
Eric Gaven	Country	Southport	1950–1966
Fred Graham	Labor	Mackay	1943–1969
Bill Gunn	Labor	Wynnum	1944–1966
Jim Hadley	ALP/QLP	Nundah	1956–1957
Pat Hanlon^{[1]}	Labor	Ithaca	1956–1974
James Heading	Country	Marodian	1947–1960
John Herbert	Liberal	Sherwood	1956–1978
Nev Hewitt	Country	Mackenzie	1956–1980
Thomas Hiley	Liberal	Coorparoo	1944–1966
Hon Paul Hilton	ALP/QLP	Carnarvon	1935–1963
Cecil Jesson	Labor	Hinchinbrook	1935–1960
Hon Arthur Jones	ALP/QLP	Charters Towers	1929–1932, 1939–1960
Vince Jones	Country	Callide	1950–1971
Greg Kehoe	ALP/QLP	Nash	1953–1957
George Keyatta	Labor	Townsville	1939–1960
Eric Lloyd	Labor	Kedron	1951–1972
David Low	Country	Cooroora	1947–1974
Hon Colin McCathie	ALP/QLP	Haughton	1950–1960
Otto Madsen	Country	Warwick	1947–1963
Hon Johnno Mann	Labor	Brisbane	1936–1969
Ivor Marsden	Labor	Ipswich	1949–1966
Hon Bill Moore	ALP/QLP	Merthyr	1940–1957
Hon Tom Moores	ALP/QLP	Kurilpa	1949–1957
Kenneth Morris	Liberal	Mount Coot-tha	1944–1963
Alf Muller	Country	Fassifern	1935–1969
Alan Munro	Liberal	Toowong	1950–1966
David Nicholson	Country	Murrumba	1950–1972
Frank Nicklin	Country	Landsborough	1932–1968
Dr Winston Noble	Liberal	Yeronga	1950–1964
Jack Pizzey	Country	Isis	1950–1968
Tom Plunkett	Country	Darlington	1929–1957
Hon Bill Power	ALP/QLP	Baroona	1935–1960
Tom Rasey	ALP/QLP	Windsor	1950–1957
Lloyd Roberts	Country	Whitsunday	1950–1961
Herbert Robinson	ALP/QLP	Sandgate	1953–1957
Alexander Skinner	ALP/QLP	Somerset	1953–1957
Norm Smith	ALP/QLP	Carpentaria	1941–1960
Jim Sparkes	Country	Aubigny	1932–1935, 1941–1960
Harold Taylor	Liberal	Clayfield	1947–1963
John Taylor	Labor	Balonne	1944–1957
Bert Turner	Labor	Kelvin Grove	1941–1957
Watty Wallace	Labor	Cairns	1956–1964
Hon Ted Walsh	ALP/QLP	Bundaberg	1935–1947, 1950–1969
Les Wood	Labor	North Toowoomba	1946–1947, 1950–1958

^{1} On 29 July 1956, the Labor member for Ithaca, Leonard Eastment, died. Labor candidate Pat Hanlon won the resulting by-election on 8 December 1956.
^{2} On 13 July 1957, three weeks before the 1957 state election, George Devries, the QLP (formerly ALP) member for Gregory, died. The election was therefore postponed in Gregory, and Country candidate Wally Rae won a special by-election called for 5 October 1957.

== See also ==
- 1956 Queensland state election
- Gair Ministry (Labor/QLP) (1952–1957)
