= Electoral results for the district of Ithaca =

Queensland, Australia, district election results

This is a list of electoral results for the electoral district of Ithaca in Queensland state elections.

== Members for Ithaca ==
Member	Party	Term
John Gilday	Labor	1912–1926
Ned Hanlon	Labor	1926–1952
Leonard Eastment	Labor	1952–1956
Pat Hanlon	Labor	1956–1960
Bob Windsor	Liberal	1960–1966
Col Miller	Liberal	1966–1984
Col Miller	Independent	1984–1986

== Election results ==
=== Elections in the 1980s ===
1983 Queensland state election: Ithaca
Party	Candidate	Votes	%	±%
Liberal	Col Miller	7,475	53.3	−6.6
Labor	Ross MacLeod	6,561	46.7	+6.6
Total formal votes		14,036	98.4	+0.4
Informal votes		228	1.6	−0.4
Turnout		14,264	91.0	+3.7
Liberal hold		Swing	−6.6	

1980 Queensland state election: Ithaca
Party	Candidate	Votes	%	±%
Liberal	Col Miller	8,114	59.9	+6.4
Labor	Peter Venning	5,440	40.1	−2.8
Total formal votes		13,554	98.0	−0.7
Informal votes		272	2.0	+0.7
Turnout		13,826	87.3	−3.6
Liberal hold		Swing	+3.9	

=== Elections in the 1970s ===
1977 Queensland state election: Ithaca
Party	Candidate	Votes	%	±%
Liberal	Col Miller	7,419	53.5	−11.2
Labor	Francis Gilbert	5,948	42.9	+7.6
Progress	Paul Rackemann	492	3.6	+3.6
Total formal votes		13,859	98.7	
Informal votes		175	1.3	
Turnout		14,034	90.9	
Two-party-preferred result
Liberal	Col Miller	7,763	56.0	−8.7
Labor	Francis Gilbert	6,096	44.0	+8.7
Liberal hold		Swing	−8.7	

1974 Queensland state election: Ithaca
Party	Candidate	Votes	%	±%
Liberal	Col Miller	7,940	65.4	+17.3
Labor	Robert Coutts	4,196	34.6	−8.7
Total formal votes		12,136	98.2	−0.2
Informal votes		216	1.8	+0.2
Turnout		12,352	87.1	−5.5
Liberal hold		Swing	+9.8	

1972 Queensland state election: Ithaca
Party	Candidate	Votes	%	±%
Liberal	Col Miller	5,429	48.1	−1.7
Labor	Sylvester Martin	4,888	43.3	+1.6
Queensland Labor	Mervyn Eunson	964	8.6	+0.1
Total formal votes		11,281	98.4	
Informal votes		180	1.6	
Turnout		11,461	92.6	
Two-party-preferred result
Liberal	Col Miller	6,271	55.6	−2.4
Labor	Sylvester Martin	5,010	44.4	−2.4
Liberal hold		Swing	−2.4	

=== Elections in the 1960s ===
1969 Queensland state election: Ithaca
Party	Candidate	Votes	%	±%
Liberal	Col Miller	5,206	49.8	+0.8
Labor	Sylvester Martin	4,355	41.7	+0.8
Queensland Labor	Anne Wenck	890	8.5	−1.5
Total formal votes		10,451	98.2	−0.3
Informal votes		191	1.8	+0.3
Turnout		10,642	90.7	−3.0
Two-party-preferred result
Liberal	Col Miller	5,953	56.8	+0.6
Labor	Sylvester Martin	4,518	43.2	−0.6
Liberal hold		Swing	+0.6	

1966 Queensland state election: Ithaca
Party	Candidate	Votes	%	±%
Liberal	Col Miller	5,225	49.0	−2.2
Labor	Samuel Hudson	4,363	40.9	+2.6
Queensland Labor	James Ashe	1,069	10.0	+1.0
Total formal votes		10,657	98.5	+0.4
Informal votes		165	1.5	−0.4
Turnout		10,822	93.7	−0.3
Two-party-preferred result
Liberal	Col Miller	5,988	56.2	−2.3
Labor	Samuel Hudson	4,669	43.8	+2.3
Liberal hold		Swing	−2.3	

1963 Queensland state election: Ithaca
Party	Candidate	Votes	%	±%
Liberal	Bob Windsor	5,442	51.2	+4.4
Labor	Lou Clifford	4,075	38.3	−4.2
Queensland Labor	James Ashe	951	8.9	−1.8
Social Credit	Bruce Tannock	159	1.5	+1.5
Total formal votes		10,627	98.1	−1.0
Informal votes		207	1.9	+1.0
Turnout		10,834	94.0	+1.7
Two-party-preferred result
Liberal	Bob Windsor	6,212	58.5	
Labor	Lou Clifford	4,415	41.5	
Liberal hold		Swing	N/A	

1960 Queensland state election: Ithaca
Party	Candidate	Votes	%	±%
Liberal	Bob Windsor	5,178	46.8	
Labor	Manfred Cross	4,705	42.5	
Queensland Labor	John O'Connell	1,180	10.7	
Total formal votes		11,063	99.1	
Informal votes		104	0.9	
Turnout		11,167	92.3	
Liberal gain from Labor		Swing		

=== Elections in the 1950s ===
1957 Queensland state election: Ithaca
Party	Candidate	Votes	%	±%
Labor	Pat Hanlon	4,222	43.9	−17.8
Liberal	Alan Edwards	3,638	37.8	−0.5
Queensland Labor	Anthony Machin	1,759	18.3	+18.3
Total formal votes		9,619	98.7	+0.1
Informal votes		123	1.3	−0.1
Turnout		9,489	96.1	+1.9
Labor hold		Swing	−8.0	

1956 Ithaca state by-election
Party	Candidate	Votes	%	±%
Labor	Pat Hanlon	5,186	59.2	−2.5
Liberal	Alan Edwards	3,578	40.8	+2.5
Total formal votes		8,764	98.6	0.0
Informal votes		127	1.4	0.0
Turnout		8,891	88.4	−5.8
Labor hold		Swing	−2.5	

1956 Queensland state election: Ithaca
Party	Candidate	Votes	%	±%
Labor	Leonard Eastment	5,967	61.7	−3.3
Liberal	Alan Edwards	3,711	38.3	+4.7
Total formal votes		9,678	98.6	−0.3
Informal votes		138	1.4	+0.3
Turnout		9,816	94.2	−1.2
Labor hold		Swing	−4.5	

1953 Queensland state election: Ithaca
Party	Candidate	Votes	%	±%
Labor	Leonard Eastment	6,513	65.0	+4.3
Liberal	Douglas Lowndes	3,361	33.6	−5.7
Communist	Herbert Heritage	141	1.4	+1.4
Total formal votes		10,015	98.9	0.0
Informal votes		107	1.1	0.0
Turnout		10,122	95.4	+1.3
Labor hold		Swing	+5.3	

1952 Ithaca state by-election
Party	Candidate	Votes	%	±%
Labor	Leonard Eastment	5,658	62.2	+1.5
Liberal	Douglas Lowndes	3,241	35.6	−3.7
Communist	Ted Bacon	194	2.1	+2.1
Total formal votes		9,093	99.1	+0.2
Informal votes		80	0.9	−0.2
Turnout		9,173		
Labor hold		Swing	N/A	

1950 Queensland state election: Ithaca
Party	Candidate	Votes	%	±%
Labor	Ned Hanlon	6,380	60.7	
Liberal	Charles Keen	4,137	39.3	
Total formal votes		10,517	98.9	
Informal votes		118	1.1	
Turnout		10,635	94.1	
Labor hold		Swing		

=== Elections in the 1940s ===
1947 Queensland state election: Ithaca
Party	Candidate	Votes	%	±%
Labor	Ned Hanlon	7,263	57.5	+3.5
People's Party	Frank Roberts	5,377	42.5	−1.7
Total formal votes		12,640	98.6	−0.3
Informal votes		181	1.4	+0.3
Turnout		12,821	92.3	+0.6
Labor hold		Swing	+2.5	

1944 Queensland state election: Ithaca
Party	Candidate	Votes	%	±%
Labor	Ned Hanlon	6,305	54.0	−2.9
People's Party	Reg Groom	5,162	44.2	+44.2
Independent	Jack McCallum	208	1.8	+1.8
Total formal votes		11,675	98.9	+0.3
Informal votes		132	1.1	−0.3
Turnout		11,807	91.7	−1.5
Labor hold		Swing	N/A	

1941 Queensland state election: Ithaca
Party	Candidate	Votes	%	±%
Labor	Ned Hanlon	6,155	56.9	+7.0
Independent	Alexander Jolly	4,174	38.6	+38.6
Independent Socialist	Ted Bacon	495	4.6	+4.6
Total formal votes		10,824	98.6	−0.5
Informal votes		158	1.4	+0.5
Turnout		10,982	93.2	−1.6
Labor hold		Swing	N/A	

- Preferences were not distributed.

=== Elections in the 1930s ===
1938 Queensland state election: Ithaca
Party	Candidate	Votes	%	±%
Labor	Ned Hanlon	5,145	49.9	−50.1
Protestant Labour	George Webb	3,448	33.4	+33.4
United Australia	Kenneth Morris	1,727	16.7	+16.7
Total formal votes		10,320	99.1	
Informal votes		97	0.9	
Turnout		10,417	94.8	
Two-candidate-preferred result
Labor	Ned Hanlon	5,226	52.3	−47.7
Protestant Labour	George Webb	4,770	47.7	+47.7
Labor hold		Swing	N/A	

1935 Queensland state election: Ithaca
Party	Candidate	Votes	%	±%
Labor	Ned Hanlon	unopposed		
Labor hold		Swing		

1932 Queensland state election: Ithaca
Party	Candidate	Votes	%	±%
Labor	Ned Hanlon	5,497	59.6	
CPNP	Thomas Thatcher	3,722	40.4	
Total formal votes		9,219	99.3	
Informal votes		69	0.7	
Turnout		9,288	93.9	
Labor hold		Swing		

=== Elections in the 1920s ===
1929 Queensland state election: Ithaca
Party	Candidate	Votes	%	±%
Labor	Ned Hanlon	3,926	51.8	−7.0
CPNP	John Shaw	3,646	48.2	+9.8
Total formal votes		7,572	99.2	+0.4
Informal votes		63	0.8	−0.4
Turnout		7,635		
Labor hold		Swing	N/A	

1926 Queensland state election: Ithaca
Party	Candidate	Votes	%	±%
Labor	Ned Hanlon	4,201	58.8	+4.5
CPNP	William Robbins	2,747	38.4	−7.3
Independent Labor	Stanley Henderson	200	2.8	+2.8
Total formal votes		7,148	98.8	−0.3
Informal votes		87	1.2	+0.3
Turnout		7,235	91.9	+1.8
Labor hold		Swing	N/A	

1923 Queensland state election: Ithaca
Party	Candidate	Votes	%	±%
Labor	John Gilday	3,549	54.3	+1.9
United	Robert Archibald	2,991	45.7	−1.9
Total formal votes		6,540	99.1	+0.1
Informal votes		60	0.9	−0.1
Turnout		6,600	90.1	+13.8
Labor hold		Swing	+1.9	

1920 Queensland state election: Ithaca
Party	Candidate	Votes	%	±%
Labor	John Gilday	3,164	52.3	−3.2
National Labor	John Morton	2,885	47.7	+47.7
Total formal votes		6,049	99.0	+1.0
Informal votes		61	1.0	−1.0
Turnout		6,111	76.3	−9.3
Labor hold		Swing	−3.2	

=== Elections in the 1910s ===
1918 Queensland state election: Ithaca
Party	Candidate	Votes	%	±%
Labor	John Gilday	3,030	55.5	−8.2
National	John Morton	2,434	44.5	+8.2
Total formal votes		5,464	98.0	−0.7
Informal votes		112	2.0	+0.7
Turnout		5,576	85.6	−5.2
Labor hold		Swing	−8.2	

1915 Queensland state election: Ithaca
Party	Candidate	Votes	%	±%
Labor	John Gilday	3,095	63.7	+8.5
Liberal	Benjamin Harding	1,763	36.3	−8.5
Total formal votes		4,858	98.7	−0.6
Informal votes		66	1.3	+0.6
Turnout		4,924	90.8	+3.7
Labor hold		Swing	+8.5	

1912 Queensland state election: Ithaca
Party	Candidate	Votes	%	±%
Labor	John Gilday	2,266	55.2	
Liberal	Arthur Hawthorn	1,837	44.8	
Total formal votes		4,103	99.3	
Informal votes		27	0.7	
Turnout		4,130	87.1	
Labor gain from Liberal		Swing		
