= Electoral results for the district of Baroona =

This is a list of electoral results for the electoral district of Baroona in Queensland state elections.

== Members for Baroona ==
Member	Party	Term
Bill Power	Labor	1935–1957
Bill Power	Queensland Labor	1957–1960
Pat Hanlon	Labor	1960–1974
Dennis Young	Liberal	1974–1977

== Election results ==
=== Elections in the 1970s ===
1974 Queensland state election: Baroona
Party	Candidate	Votes	%	±%
Liberal	Dennis Young	5,643	48.4	+20.4
Labor	John Camp	5,528	47.4	−15.2
Queensland Labor	Denis Cochran	484	4.1	−5.3
Total formal votes		11,655	97.6	+0.3
Informal votes		280	2.4	−0.3
Turnout		11,935	84.7	−5.8
Two-party-preferred result
Liberal	Dennis Young	6,022	51.7	+15.8
Labor	John Camp	5,633	48.3	−15.8
Liberal gain from Labor		Swing	+15.8	

1972 Queensland state election: Baroona
Party	Candidate	Votes	%	±%
Labor	Pat Hanlon	7,110	62.6	−1.2
Liberal	John Andrews	3,184	28.0	+1.7
Queensland Labor	Maurice O'Connor	1,073	9.4	−0.5
Total formal votes		11,367	97.3	
Informal votes		318	2.7	
Turnout		11,685	90.5	
Two-party-preferred result
Labor	Pat Hanlon	7,291	64.1	+0.9
Liberal	John Andrews	4,076	35.9	−0.9
Labor hold		Swing	+0.9	

=== Elections in the 1960s ===
1969 Queensland state election: Baroona
Party	Candidate	Votes	%	±%
Labor	Pat Hanlon	6,427	63.8	+4.1
Liberal	Thomas Bence	2,648	26.3	−4.8
Queensland Labor	Anthony Machin	998	9.9	+2.2
Total formal votes		10,073	97.2	+0.3
Informal votes		288	2.8	−0.3
Turnout		10,361	88.8	−2.9
Two-party-preferred result
Labor	Pat Hanlon	6,613	65.7	+3.4
Liberal	Thomas Bence	3,460	34.4	−3.4
Labor hold		Swing	+3.4	

1966 Queensland state election: Baroona
Party	Candidate	Votes	%	±%
Labor	Pat Hanlon	6,359	59.7	−1.7
Liberal	Ian Barron	3,313	31.1	+1.7
Queensland Labor	Anthony Machin	822	7.7	+0.7
Communist	Brian Moynihan	151	1.4	−0.8
Total formal votes		9,645	96.9	−0.3
Informal votes		342	3.1	+0.3
Turnout		9,987	91.7	−1.3
Two-party-preferred result
Labor	Pat Hanlon	6,633	62.3	−1.5
Liberal	Ian Barron	4,012	37.7	+1.5
Labor hold		Swing	−1.5	

1963 Queensland state election: Baroona
Party	Candidate	Votes	%	±%
Labor	Pat Hanlon	7,601	61.4	+2.6
Liberal	Dawn Stanton	3,209	29.4	+0.8
Queensland Labor	Douglas Garsden	764	7.0	−5.6
Communist	Vincent Englart	239	2.2	+2.2
Total formal votes		10,913	97.2	−1.3
Informal votes		317	2.8	+1.3
Turnout		11,230	93.3	+1.7
Two-party-preferred result
Labor	Pat Hanlon	6,963	63.8	
Liberal	Dawn Stanton	3,950	36.2	
Labor hold		Swing	N/A	

1960 Queensland state election: Baroona
Party	Candidate	Votes	%	±%
Labor	Pat Hanlon	7,094	58.8	+21.0
Liberal	Roger Moore	3,450	28.6	−6.2
Queensland Labor	Geoffrey Maule	1,521	12.6	−14.8
Total formal votes		12,065	98.5	
Informal votes		182	1.5	
Turnout		12,247	91.6	
Labor gain from Queensland Labor		Swing	N/A	

=== Elections in the 1950s ===
1957 Queensland state election: Baroona
Party	Candidate	Votes	%	±%
Queensland Labor	Bill Power	3,333	40.6	+40.6
Liberal	Robert Thomasson	2,691	32.8	−0.2
Labor	Norman Buchan	2,177	26.5	−38.3
Total formal votes		8,201	98.2	−0.3
Informal votes		149	1.8	+0.3
Turnout		8,350	93.0	+2.3
Queensland Labor gain from Labor		Swing	N/A	

1956 Queensland state election: Baroona
Party	Candidate	Votes	%	±%
Labor	Bill Power	5,525	64.8	−35.2
Liberal	Robert Thomasson	2,816	33.0	+33.0
Communist	Kevin Loughlin	190	2.2	+2.2
Total formal votes		8,531	98.5	
Informal votes		126	1.5	
Turnout		8,657	90.7	
Labor hold		Swing	N/A	

1953 Queensland state election: Baroona
Party	Candidate	Votes	%	±%
Labor	Bill Power	unopposed		
Labor hold		Swing		

1950 Queensland state election: Baroona
Party	Candidate	Votes	%	±%
Labor	Bill Power	6,439	61.7	
Liberal	Harry Middleton	3,768	36.1	
Communist	Max Julius	223	2.1	
Total formal votes		10,430	98.5	
Informal votes		159	1.5	
Turnout		10,589	91.4	
Labor hold		Swing		

=== Elections in the 1940s ===
1947 Queensland state election: Baroona
Party	Candidate	Votes	%	±%
Labor	Bill Power	5,810	55.5	+0.2
People's Party	Kenneth Toombes	3,974	37.9	−6.8
Communist	Max Julius	449	4.3	+4.3
Independent	Henry Beck	239	2.3	+2.3
Total formal votes		10,472	98.3	−0.2
Informal votes		178	1.7	+0.2
Turnout		10,650	88.9	+0.9
Labor hold		Swing	+4.1	

1944 Queensland state election: Baroona
Party	Candidate	Votes	%	±%
Labor	Bill Power	5,415	55.3	−4.6
People's Party	Richard Cooper	4,370	44.7	+4.6
Total formal votes		9,785	98.5	+0.9
Informal votes		147	1.5	−0.9
Turnout		9,932	88.0	−1.6
Labor hold		Swing	−4.6	

1941 Queensland state election: Baroona
Party	Candidate	Votes	%	±%
Labor	Bill Power	5,317	59.9	+10.3
United Australia	Cecil Noble	3,564	40.1	+17.3
Total formal votes		8,881	97.6	−1.1
Informal votes		219	2.4	+1.1
Turnout		9,100	89.6	−2.8
Labor hold		Swing	N/A	

=== Elections in the 1930s ===
1938 Queensland state election: Baroona
Party	Candidate	Votes	%	±%
Labor	Bill Power	4,571	49.6	−19.6
Protestant Labour	Ralph Powell	2,539	27.6	+27.6
United Australia	Edwyn Roper	2,103	22.8	+22.8
Total formal votes		9,213	98.7	+2.4
Informal votes		123	1.3	−2.4
Turnout		9,336	92.4	+2.7
Two-candidate-preferred result
Labor	Bill Power	4,736	57.7	−11.5
Protestant Labour	Ralph Powell	3,478	42.3	+42.3
Labor hold		Swing	N/A	

1935 Queensland state election: Baroona
Party	Candidate	Votes	%	±%
Labor	Bill Power	5,835	69.2	
Social Credit	Julius Streeter	2,600	30.8	
Total formal votes		8,435	96.3	
Informal votes		320	3.7	
Turnout		8,755	89.7	
Labor hold		Swing		
