= Electoral results for the district of Darlington (Queensland) =

Queensland, Australia, district election results

This is a list of electoral results for the electoral district of Darlington in Queensland state elections.

== Members for Darlington ==
Member	Party	Term
Tom Plunkett	Country	1950–1957
Leslie Harrison	Country	1957–1960

== Election results ==
=== Elections in the 1950s ===
1957 Queensland state election: Darlington
Party	Candidate	Votes	%	±%
Country	Leslie Harrison	6,589	60.1	−7.8
Labor	Charles Knoll	2,227	20.3	−11.8
Independent	Michael Smith	1,874	17.1	+17.1
Independent	Henry Longfield	273	2.5	+2.5
Total formal votes		10,963	98.8	+0.1
Informal votes		128	1.2	−0.1
Turnout		11,091	93.9	+2.5
Country hold		Swing	+6.8	

1956 Queensland state election: Darlington
Party	Candidate	Votes	%	±%
Country	Tom Plunkett	6,823	67.9	+1.3
Labor	Charles Knoll	3,223	32.1	−1.3
Total formal votes		10,046	98.7	+1.8
Informal votes		130	1.3	−1.8
Turnout		10,176	91.4	−1.9
Country hold		Swing	+1.3	

1953 Queensland state election: Darlington
Party	Candidate	Votes	%	±%
Country	Tom Plunkett	6,507	66.6	−33.4
Labor	Charles Knoll	2,998	30.7	+30.7
Communist	William Yarrow	270	2.8	+2.8
Total formal votes		9,775	96.9	
Informal votes		314	3.1	
Turnout		10,089	93.3	
Country hold		Swing	N/A	

1950 Queensland state election: Darlington
Party	Candidate	Votes	%	±%
Country	Tom Plunkett	unopposed		
Country hold		Swing		
