= Dennis Young (Australian politician) =

Australian politician

Dr Dennis Young AM

Member of the Queensland Legislative Assembly for Baroona
- In office 7 December 1974 – 12 November 1977
- Preceded by: Pat Hanlon
- Succeeded by: Seat abolished

Personal details
- Born: Dennis Charles Young; 7 August 1947 (age 78) Brisbane, Queensland, Australia
- Party: Liberal Party
- Occupation: Police officer

Dr Dennis Charles Young AM (born 7 August 1947) is an Australian politician and public health campaigner. He was a Liberal Party member of the Legislative Assembly of Queensland from 1974 to 1977, representing the electorate of Baroona. Since 1988, Young has worked for the alcohol and other drug not for profit organisation Drug ARM as national Executive Director from 1988 to 2018 then as Chief Advocate and Company Secretary.

== Early life ==
Young was born in Brisbane, and was educated at Kelvin Grove State School and Kelvin Grove State High School. He was a police officer before entering politics; he also worked for the Juvenile Aid Bureau for eight years.

== Politics ==
An active member of the Liberal Party, Young served as chairman of his local branch from 1973 to 1975 and was a member of the party's state executive from 1974 to 1975.

Young was elected to the Legislative Assembly at the 1974 election, winning the formerly safe Labor seat of Baroona amidst the landslide Liberal-National victory that year. The seat had been vacated by retiring former Shadow Treasurer Pat Hanlon. Baroona was merged with the adjacent Brisbane electorate to form the Brisbane Central electorate at the 1977 election, and Brisbane MLA Harold Lowes retired after one term, allowing Young to contest the new seat; however, he was defeated by Labor candidate and former Brisbane MLA Brian Davis.

== Later life ==
Young returned to his career as a police officer after his election defeat. In 1988, however, he was appointed as the national director of alcohol and other drug organisation Drug ARM. He is frequently cited in the media on drug-related issues in this capacity; his expertise in this area has also seen him serve as president of the Queensland Network of Alcohol and Drug Agencies and as a member of the Australian National Council on Drugs.

In 2018 Young was recognised in the Australia Day Honours List for his significant service to community health in Queensland through alcohol and drug treatment support programs, and to the community.

He was again recognised for his service by the Queensland Mental Health Commission in 2022 with a Lifetime Achievement Award in honour of distinguished service, significant contribution and leadership in the alcohol and other drugs sector in Queensland.

In 2008, he diagnosed with fatty liver disease in August 2005. He subsequently had a liver transplant in May 2006.

Parliament of Queensland
Preceded by Pat Hanlon	Member for Baroona; 1974–1977	Abolished
