= Harold Lowes =

Australian lawyer and politician

Member of the Queensland Legislative Assembly for Brisbane
- In office 7 December 1974 – 12 November 1977
- Preceded by: Brian Davis
- Succeeded by: Seat abolished

Personal details
- Born: Harold Bertram Lowes; 1 October 1926 South Brisbane, Queensland, Australia
- Died: 22 August 2002 (aged 75) Indooroopilly, Queensland, Australia
- Party: Liberal Party
- Spouse(s): Mavis Alice Canning (m.1950), Mary Christina Mackay (m.1977), Maureen Turnball (m.1993)
- Relations: William Bertram (grandfather)
- Occupation: Solicitor

Harold Bertram Lowes (1 October 1926 – 22 August 2002) was an Australian lawyer and politician. He was a Liberal Party member of the Legislative Assembly of Queensland from 1974 until 1977, representing the electorate of Brisbane.

Lowes was born in South Brisbane, the grandson of former Speaker of the Legislative Assembly of Queensland William Bertram. His family moved around the state following his father's work for the Department of Health, and he was educated at South Brisbane State School, the Anglican Church Grammar School, and Townsville Grammar School. He served in the Australian Imperial Forces from 1945 until 1946, attaining the rank of lieutenant, and in the Citizens Military Forces from 1948 to 1952. Lowes completed his articled clerkship and the Solicitors Board course during this period, and was admitted as a solicitor in 1952. He initially moved to Darwin to practise, but returned to Brisbane in 1954.

Lowes was an active member of the Liberal Party from the 1950s, and served on the party's policy committee, in several branch positions, and from 1960 to 1961 was a member of the party's state executive. He unsuccessfully contested the usually safe Labor seat of Brisbane at the 1972 state election, but was elected for the same seat amidst the National-Liberal landslide win at the 1974 election. His seat was merged with the adjacent seat of Baroona, held by fellow Liberal Dennis Young, to form Brisbane Central at the 1977 election, and Lowes retired and returned to his legal practice, Phillips & Lowes.

In addition to his legal practice, Lowes served as a board member and later chairman of the North Brisbane Hospital Board after leaving politics. He also owned an oyster farm on Moreton Island. He left his firm to one of his sons, Geoffrey, in 1988, and worked as a legal officer for the Department of Harbours and Marines until 1992. He died on 22 August 2002 at Indooroopilly.

Parliament of Queensland
Preceded by Brian Davis	Member for Brisbane; 1974–1977	Abolished
