= Robert Funnell =

Australian politician

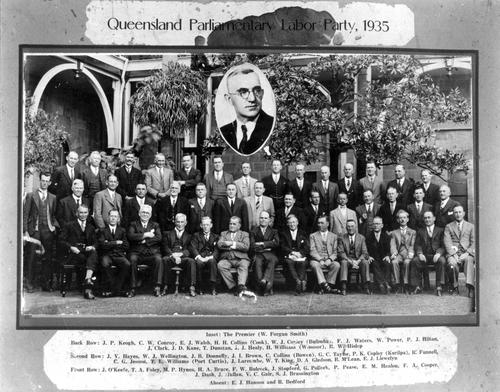
- Queensland Parliamentary Labor Party, 1935. Funnell is eighth from the left, second back row.

Member of the Queensland Legislative Assembly for Brisbane
- In office 11 June 1932 – 3 January 1936
- Preceded by: Mick Kirwan
- Succeeded by: Johnno Mann

Personal details
- Born: Robert Funnell; 1895 Tweed River, New South Wales, Australia
- Died: 3 January 1936 (aged 40 or 41) Brisbane, Queensland, Australia
- Resting place: Toowong Cemetery
- Party: Labor
- Spouse: Aileen Vera Donovan (m.1929 d.1950)
- Occupation: Station hand, Shearer, Business owner

Robert Funnell (1895 – 3 January 1936) was a member of the Queensland Legislative Assembly.

== Early years ==
Funnell was born in the Tweed River area of New South Wales, to parents John Funnell, farmer, and his wife Mary Ann (née Petrie) and came to Queensland at an early age. They first settled in Woombye before moving to Brisbane where he received his state primary education.

After leaving school, Funnell worked as a station hand, shearer, and sugar worker before becoming an organiser with the Australian Workers' Union. In this role, he represented the union at state meetings and conventions and was also a delegate to the Queensland Central Executive. He later relinquished that position to open fruit businesses in Brisbane.

== Political career ==
After losing a party plebiscite for the seat of Ithaca, Funnell was chosen to be the Labor Party candidate for the seat of Brisbane at the 1932 state election, defeating the long-standing member, Mick Kirwan.

Funnell retained the seat for Labor as the party won back government after three years in opposition. He held the seat until his death in 1936, and during his term he had been a member of the Public Works Committee.

== Personal life ==
Funnell married Aileen Vera Donovan (died 1955) on 25 May 1929 and together had two sons. He was a talented sportsman and represented the state in rugby union.

Whilst holidaying at Burleigh Heads in January 1936, Funnell returned to Brisbane to undergo an operation for appendicitis at the Mater Misericordiae Hospital. He collapsed in the theatre, and died before the operation could commence. His funeral was held at St Stephen's Cathedral and proceeded to the Toowong Cemetery.

Parliament of Queensland
Preceded by Mick Kirwan	Member for Brisbane; 1932–1936	Succeeded by Johnno Mann
