= Col Miller (politician) =

Australian politician

Member of the Queensland Legislative Assembly for Ithaca
- In office 28 May 1966 – 1 November 1986
- Preceded by: Robert Windsor
- Succeeded by: Seat abolished

Personal details
- Born: Colin John Miller; 28 April 1924 Brisbane, Queensland, Australia
- Died: 4 November 2016 (aged 92) Caloundra, Queensland
- Party: Liberal Party
- Spouse(s): Grace Warner Weathered (m.1949 d.1985), Janice Bartlett (m.1991)
- Occupation: Painter

Colin John (Col) Miller (28 April 1924 – 4 November 2016) was an Australian politician. He was a member of the Queensland Legislative Assembly from 1966 to 1986, representing the electorate of Ithaca as a Liberal (1966–1984) and as an independent (1984–1986).

== Early life ==
Miller was born in Brisbane, Queensland, to parents Charles Miller and his wife Ann Jane (née Weathered). He was educated at the Rainworth State School and the Central Technical College. In World War II he was a corporal in the Australian Imperial Force and was assigned to the 2/3 Field Park from 1943 to 1946. He became a painter on leaving the armed forces. A member of the Freemasons, Miller was also a member of the local Lions Club. He was the chairman of the RSL from 1959 until 1966.

On 13 June 1949, Miller married Grace Warner Weathered and together had three sons.

== Politics ==
Miller, for the Liberal Party, held the seat of Ithaca in the Queensland Legislative Assembly from in 1966 until his retirement from politics in 1986. He was the Minister for Environment, Valuation and Administrative Services for fourteen days in 1983, having been appointed to replace sacked minister Terry White before all Liberal ministers subsequently resigned. In November 1983, he was the unsuccessful Liberal nominee for Speaker against National John Warner.

Miller was a conservative within the Liberal Party, and in July 1984, he resigned from the party, "at least partly sparked by" the preselection of moderate Terry Gygar for the Stafford by-election. Although it had been rumoured that he would join former colleagues Don Lane and Brian Austin in defecting to the National Party, this did not occur and he continued to sit as an independent. He retired at the 1986 state election.

== Later life ==
Miller's wife Grace Lorna known as "Lorna" died in 1985. On 7 September 1991 he married Janice Bartlett.

He died on 4 November 2016 aged 92 years at Caloundra.

Parliament of Queensland
Preceded by Robert Windsor	Member for Ithaca; 1966–1986	Abolished
