= Mick Kirwan =

Australian politician (1873–1941)

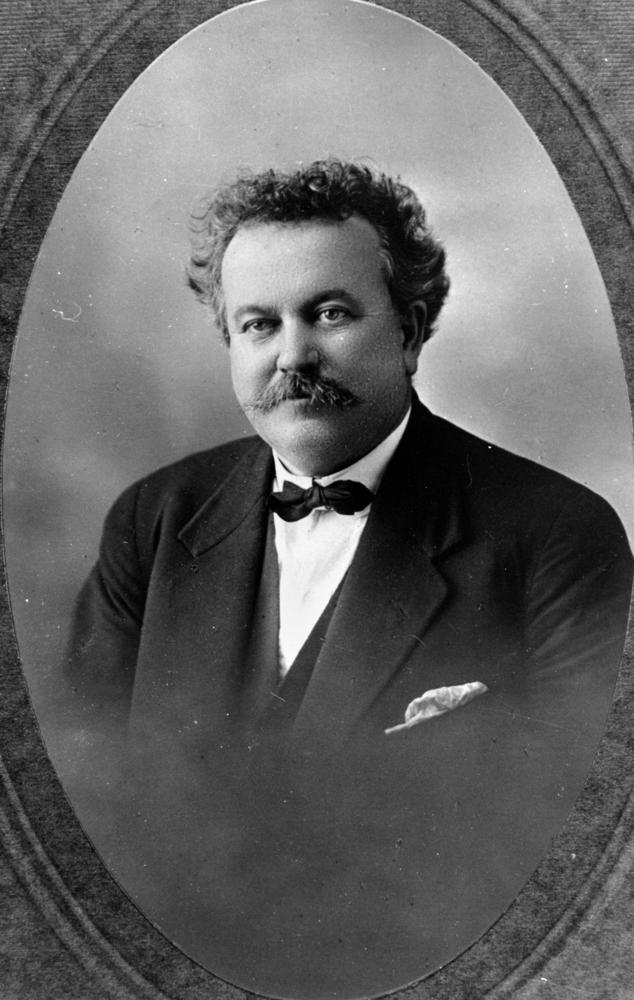

Member of the Queensland Legislative Assembly for Brisbane
- In office 27 April 1912 – 11 June 1932
- Preceded by: New seat
- Succeeded by: Robert Funnell

Personal details
- Born: Michael Joseph Kirwan; 26 April 1873 "Jinbah", Maryborough, Queensland, Australia
- Died: 13 February 1941 (aged 67) Brisbane, Queensland, Australia
- Resting place: Nudgee Cemetery
- Party: Labor
- Spouse: Katherine Swift (m.1912 d.1945)
- Occupation: Bootmaker, Queensland Railways employee

Michael Joseph Kirwan (26 April 1873 – 13 February 1941) was a member of the Queensland Legislative Assembly.

== Early years ==
Kirwan was born at "Jinbah", Maryborough, Queensland, to parents Michael Kirwan, who was a sugar worker, and his wife Sarah (née Costello), both of whom had originated from County Tipperary, Ireland. He started his education at the local state school in Yengarie before his family moved to Brisbane and he continued his schooling at Petrie Terrace.

He started his working career as an apprentice bootmaker in 1884, and in 1907 he joined the railways as a porter. Due to his strong vocal abilities, Kirwan made a name for himself as a train-caller. As an active member of the Australian Railways Union, Kirwan found himself as one of those at the centre of the 1912 Brisbane general strike, for which he was sacked after the strike came to an end.

== Political career ==
Kirwan's first attempt at entering Queensland Parliament came at the 1902 state election. As the Labour candidate for the seat of Logan, he was easily defeated by the sitting member, James Stodart of the Ministerialist Party by 565 votes to 239.

Ten years later, at the 1912 state election, Kirwan was nominated as the Labor candidate for the seat of Brisbane. He found himself up against the long serving parliamentarian, Edward Barrow Forrest, who had represented the seat since 1899. A close contest ensued, and Kirwan won by 2187 votes to 2150. Kirwan went on to hold the seat for twenty years until he was disendorsed by his party in favour of Australian Workers' Union organizer, Robert Funnell, for the 1932 state election.

A vehement anti-conscriptionist, Kirwan was an enthusiastic and dedicated politician and over the years he became a quality speaker and debater. He was appointed chairman of committees in 1920 and in 1924 was one of those elevated to cabinet during the brief and abortive rebellion against Premier Ted Theodore. He wrongly thought this would ruin his political career but on the 14 July 1924 he was promoted to Minister without Office and on 26 February 1925 became Secretary for Public Works, holding this position until his party lost office in 1929.

After losing his nomination in 1932, Premier William Forgan Smith appointed Kirwan as an official of the Queensland Tourist Bureau. He joined the Queensland Department of Agriculture and Stock as a member of the library staff in 1938 and retired later in that year.

== Personal life ==
Kirwan married Katherine Swift (died 1945) at Tenterfield on 29 September 1912 and together had one son. He was the first president of the Surf Life Saving Australia (Queensland centre) in 1931–41 and was a member and office-bearer of the Queensland Irish Association.

Suffering a cerebral haemorrhage, Kirwan died in February 1941. He was accorded a state funeral, to be presided over by Archbishop Duhig at St Stephen's Cathedral and proceeded to the Nudgee Catholic Cemetery.

Parliament of Queensland
New seat	Member for Brisbane; 1912–1932	Succeeded by Robert Funnell
