= Brian Davis (politician) =

Australian politician (1934–2018)

Member of the Queensland Legislative Assembly for Brisbane
- In office 17 May 1969 – 7 December 1974
- Preceded by: Johnno Mann
- Succeeded by: Harold Lowes

Member of the Queensland Legislative Assembly for Brisbane Central
- In office 12 November 1977 – 2 December 1989
- Preceded by: New seat
- Succeeded by: Peter Beattie

Personal details
- Born: Brian John Davis; 7 July 1934 Toowoomba, Queensland, Australia
- Died: 31 August 2018 (aged 84) Mitchelton, Queensland, Australia
- Party: Labor
- Spouse: Jean Christina Wallace
- Occupation: Taxi driver, Trade union organiser, Truck driver

Brian John Davis (7 July 1934 – 31 August 2018) was an Australian politician. He was an Australian Labor Party member of the Queensland Legislative Assembly from 1969 to 1974 and from 1977 to 1989.

He was born in Toowoomba to Richard Davis and Constance Mary, née Quinlan. He attended Catholic schools, and worked as a van salesman, a taxi proprietor, a truck driver and a taxi driver before entering politics. As an official with the Transport Workers Union, he was a member of the Labor Party, serving as president of the Fortitude Valley branch and state president of the Young Labor Association (1963).

In 1969 he was elected to the Queensland Legislative Assembly as the member for Brisbane. In 1972 he was promoted to the front bench as Shadow Minister for Welfare, Sport and Tourism. He lost his seat at the 1974 election in which Labor was cut down to a "cricket team" of 11 members. However, he returned in 1977 as the member for Brisbane Central, which included the bulk of his old seat. From 1977 he was Opposition Spokesman on Transport, moving to Works and Water Resources in 1980 and back to Transport in 1981. In 1982 he was appointed Leader of Opposition Business, but in 1984 stepped down from the front bench to become Opposition Whip. Davis retired in 1989.

Davis died aged 84 on 31 August 2018.

Parliament of Queensland
Preceded by Johnno Mann	Member for Brisbane; 1969–1974	Succeeded by Harold Lowes
New seat	Member for Brisbane Central; 1977–1989	Succeeded by Peter Beattie
