= Leslie Harrison =

Australian politician

Member of the Queensland Legislative Assembly for Darlington
- In office 3 Aug 1957 – 28 May 1960
- Preceded by: Tom Plunkett
- Succeeded by: Seat abolished

Member of the Queensland Legislative Assembly for Logan
- In office 28 May 1960 – 15 April 1966
- Preceded by: New seat
- Succeeded by: Dick Wood

Personal details
- Born: Robert Leslie Harrison; 9 May 1903 Beenleigh, Queensland, Australia
- Died: 15 April 1966 (aged 62) Beaudesert, Queensland, Australia
- Party: Country Party
- Spouse: Sheila Mimosa Joyce (m.1929 d.1992)
- Occupation: Dairy farmer

Robert Leslie Harrison (9 May 1903 – 15 April 1966) was a dairy farmer and member of the Queensland Legislative Assembly.

== Biography ==
Harrison was born at Beenleigh, Queensland, to parents Robert Harrison and his wife Sarah (née Kerlin). He went to Gleneagle and Beaudesert State Schools before attending Brisbane Grammar School at Spring Hill, Brisbane. He became a dairy farmer at Gleneagle, Beaudesert.

During World War II Harrison was a member of the Volunteer Defence Corps and was a member of the District War Agricultural Committee. He was a member of the Queensland Milk Board from 1940 until 1952 and then was on the coordinating board for stock routes and watering facilities. He was also a member of the CSIRO State Committee from 1950 to 1965 and was also a member of several dairy related groups.

On 24 January 1929 he married Sheila Mimosa Joyce (died 1992) and together had one son and two daughters. He died in April 1966, shortly before the 1966 state elections and was cremated at Mount Thompson Crematorium.

== Political career ==
At the 1957 Queensland elections, Harrison won the seat of Darlington for the Country Party. He remained the member until Darlington was abolished for the 1960 state election, and moved to the seat of Logan. He remained its member until ill health forced him to announce his resignation shortly before his death in 1966.

Parliament of Queensland
Preceded by Tom Plunkett	Member for Darlington; 1957–1960	Abolished
New seat	Member for Logan; 1960–1966	Succeeded by Dick Wood
