= Bob Windsor (politician) =

Australian politician and businessman

Member of the Queensland Legislative Assembly for Fortitude Valley
- In office 3 August 1957 – 28 May 1960
- Preceded by: Michael Brosnan
- Succeeded by: Seat abolished

Member of the Queensland Legislative Assembly for Ithaca
- In office 28 May 1960 – 28 May 1966
- Preceded by: Pat Hanlon
- Succeeded by: Col Miller

Personal details
- Born: Robert Levi Windsor; 28 November 1896 Mackay, Queensland, Australia
- Died: 8 April 1988 (aged 91) Brisbane, Queensland, Australia
- Resting place: Toowong Cemetery
- Party: Liberal Party
- Spouse(s): Violet Newman (m.1920 d.1938), Hazel Gladys Gordon (m.1941 d.2000)
- Occupation: Businessman

Robert Levi Windsor (28 November 1896 – 8 April 1988) was a businessman and member of the Queensland Legislative Assembly.

== Biography ==
Windsor was born in the Central Queensland town of Mackay to parents Levi Windsor and his wife Mary (née Dunn). He went to school in Mackay and took his college degree in engineering at the Brisbane Technical College. In World War I, he was a stretcher bearer in the 15th Field Ambulance 5th Division from 1915 until 1919. He was gassed in 1917 and went AWOL to London in 1919. He joined the Volunteer Defence Corps in World War II for a year.

In 1926, he established the RL Windsor & Son Pty Ltd, an engineering company now known as Fibre King. He was also the chairman of Condamine Oil Ltd from 1955 until 1957. His interests were sports specifically, tennis, swimming and motorcycle riding. Windsor was a Sunday School supervisor for 30 years and a member of the City Congregationalist Church.

On 20 October 1920 Windsor married Violet Newman. Violet died in 1938 and on 12 April 1941 he married Hazel Gladys Gordon. He had a total of 5 children including one boy and four girls. He died in April 1988 and was buried in the Toowong Cemetery.

== Public career ==
Windsor, for the Liberal Party, won the seat of Fortitude Valley in the Queensland Legislative Assembly, beating the sitting member, Mick Brosnan in 1957. The seat was abolished before the 1960 state election and Windsor then contested and won the seat of Ithaca, holding it for six years until his retirement from politics.

In his time in parliament he never missed a sitting day, a record at the time. When campaigning, he would take a gramophone and a pile of records and play requests to attract and maintain a crowd. Although he was not a drinker, he used the Breakfast Creek Hotel as a meeting place during his campaign and visited it every day.

Parliament of Queensland
Preceded by Michael Brosnan	Member for Fortitude Valley; 1957–1960	Abolished
Preceded by Pat Hanlon	Member for Ithaca; 1960–1966	Succeeded by Col Miller
