= Mick Brosnan =

Australian publican and politician

Member of the Queensland Legislative Assembly for Fortitude Valley
- In office 18 November 1950 – 3 August 1957
- Preceded by: Samuel Brassington
- Succeeded by: Robert Windsor

Personal details
- Born: Michael Timothy Brosnan; 5 December 1907 Winton, Queensland, Australia
- Died: 20 July 1966 (aged 58) Stafford, Queensland, Australia
- Resting place: Toowong Cemetery
- Party: QLP
- Other political affiliations: Labor
- Spouse: Merle Isabel Adeline Cutlack (m.1933 d.1990)
- Occupation: Publican

Michael Timothy Brosnan (5 December 1907 – 20 July 1966) was a publican and member of the Queensland Legislative Assembly.

== Biography ==
Brosnan was born in the outback Queensland town of Winton to parents Michael Brosnan and his wife Edith Elizabeth (née Kettle). He worked for the Tramway Department of the Brisbane City Council as an electrical fitter and mechanic from 1928 until 1944. He then became an organiser for the Electrical Trades Union from 1944 to 1950 and then was licensee at a series of hotels in Brisbane, Townsville, South Australia, and Tewantin.

On 18 January 1933 he married Merle Isabel Adeline Cutlack (died 1990) and together had one son. Brosnan died at Stafford in Brisbane in July 1966 and was buried in the Toowong Cemetery.

== Public career ==
Brosnan was the Labor member for the Queensland state seat of Fortitude Valley from 1950 until 1957. In the 1957 split of the Labor Party in Queensland, he sided with Premier Vince Gair and most of his cabinet in forming the Queensland Labor Party. Brosnan lost his seat to the Liberal Candidate, Bob Windsor at the election held later that year.

While a member of the Labor, he held the following party positions:

- Member, ALP Industrial Groups Executive
- Member, Queensland ALP Executive Committee, 1953 - 1956
- Delegate, Queensland Central Executive, 1953 - 1956
- Queensland delegate to the federal ALP conference, 1956

He was also the sole Australian delegate at the General Conference of the Commonwealth Parliamentary Association in Ottawa, Canada in 1952.

Parliament of Queensland
Preceded by Samuel Brassington	Member for Fortitude Valley; 1950–1957	Succeeded by Robert Windsor
