= Electoral district of Baroona =

Former state electoral district of Queensland, Australia

Baroona Queensland—Legislative Assembly
- State: Queensland
- Created: 1935
- Abolished: 1977
- Namesake: Baroona, Paddington

Baroona was an electoral district of the Legislative Assembly in the Australian state of Queensland from 1935 to 1977.

It mostly covered the inner western suburbs of Brisbane. It was mostly a safe seat for the Labor Party, but was won by the Liberal Party in the 1974 election.

It was abolished in the redistribution before the 1977 election, and its territory divided between the districts of Brisbane Central, Ithaca and Ashgrove.

== Members for Baroona ==
Member	Party	Term
Bill Power	Labor	1935–1957
Bill Power	Queensland Labor	1957–1960
Pat Hanlon	Labor	1960–1974
Dennis Young	Liberal	1974–1977

== See also ==
- Electoral districts of Queensland
- Members of the Queensland Legislative Assembly by year
- Category:Members of the Queensland Legislative Assembly by name
