= Johnno Mann =

Australian politician

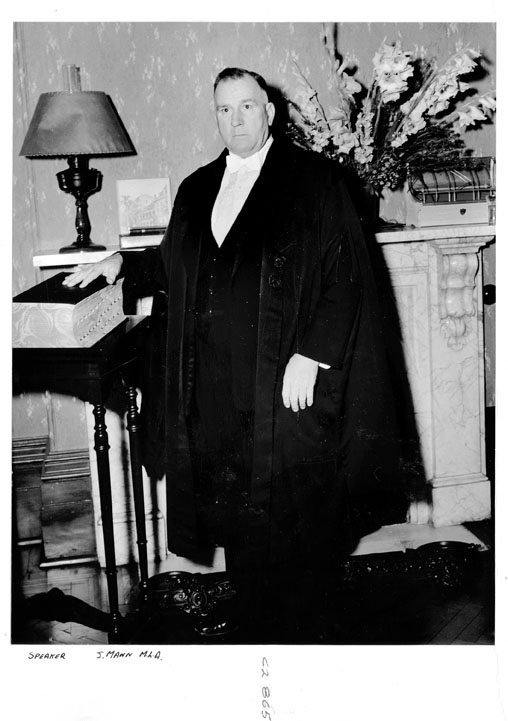

Speaker of the Queensland Legislative Assembly
- In office 10 October 1950 – 3 August 1957
- Preceded by: Samuel Brassington
- Succeeded by: Alan Fletcher

Member of the Queensland Legislative Assembly for Brisbane
- In office 4 April 1936 – 17 May 1969
- Preceded by: Robert Funnell
- Succeeded by: Brian Davis

Personal details
- Born: John Henry Mann; 30 June 1896 Rockhampton, Queensland, Australia
- Died: 7 January 1973 (aged 76) New Farm, Queensland, Australia
- Party: Labor
- Spouse: Ellen Maria Hansen (m.1919)
- Occupation: Stockman, meatworker, cane cutter, Trade union official

John Henry "Johnno" Mann (30 June 1896 – 7 January 1973) was a member of the Queensland Legislative Assembly.

== Early years ==
Mann was born in Rockhampton, Queensland, to parents William Joseph and his wife Janet (née Low) and was educated at Mount Morgan Boys Central School. He worked at a variety of jobs including stockman, wharfie, meatworker, and cane cutter before moving to Brisbane during late years of the depression.

== Political career ==
In January 1936, the Labor member for the state seat of Brisbane, Robert Funnell, unexpectedly died. Mann was chosen by the party to contest the April by-election which he easily won and went on to represent the electorate for over 33 years until his retirement from politics on 17 May 1969.

Mann was Chairman of Committees from 3 Aug 1944 until 10 Oct 1950 at which time he was appointed Speaker of the Queensland Parliament. He ran the Office of the Speaker with forceful dignity and years later he advised "you never forget you're the boss, and you never let anyone else forget you’re the boss". Mann's time as Speaker ended with Labor's defeat at the 1957 state election.

Mann's reputation as a drinker and gambler was legendary and his time in Parliament was not without controversy. Mann was once caught in a police raid on an illegal baccarat school in South Brisbane. After being attacked by his opponents in the Assembly over the issue, he explained to the House that as a conscientious member of Parliament he was monitoring the illegal casino with a plan to exposing its activities when the police arrived. Another incident occurred when his chauffeur-driven official limousine had an accident revealing the fact that he was using the vehicle to transport a racing greyhound.

After his retirement from Parliament a former member of the Nicklin Ministry noted that "there were few crimes [Mann] has not, at some time committed". After allegations that Mann had been involved in a corrupt tendering process in relation to sewerage contracts at Redcliffe, A royal commission was established to investigate the matter but in the end, Mann was exonerated. Loyalty and mateship were important to Mann though. In 1972, he handed back his life membership of the Labor Party after they disendorsed sitting members Ed Casey, Col Bennett, and Merv Thackeray.

== Personal life ==
Mann married Ellen Maria Hansen on the 25 June 1919 and together had one son and seven daughters. He was a member of the Royal Antediluvian Order of Buffaloes and head and life member of the Caledonian Society. A generous benefactor of the disadvantaged, Mann gave a substantial part of his parliamentary salary to the poorer residents of Spring Hill during the depression of the late 1930s.

Mann died at Brisbane in early January, 1973. During the motion-of-condolence debate after Mann's death, former Liberal and National Party member of parliament, Don Lane noted "he was fair dinkum to his mates. He was open handed towards his friends and constituents, and if any were "down and out", or destitute for money or help in the home, he would be the first to give assistance from his own pocket."

Parliament of Queensland
Preceded by Samuel Brassington	Speaker of the Legislative Assembly; 1950–1957	Succeeded by Alan Fletcher
Preceded by Robert Funnell	Member for Brisbane; 1936–1969	Succeeded by Brian Davis
