= Electoral district of Darlington (Queensland) =

Darlington Queensland—Legislative Assembly
- State: Queensland
- Created: 1949
- Abolished: 1959
- Namesake: Darlington Range

Darlington was a Legislative Assembly electorate in the state of Queensland. It was created in 1949 largely from the former Electoral district of Albert and was replaced (or renamed) in 1959 by the Electoral district of Logan.

== Members ==
The following members represented Darlington.

Member	Party	Term
Tom Plunkett	Country	1950–1957
Leslie Harrison	Country	1957–1960

== See also ==
- Electoral districts of Queensland
- Members of the Queensland Legislative Assembly by year
- Category:Members of the Queensland Legislative Assembly by name
