= Tom Plunkett =

Australian politician

Tom Plunkett CBE, JP
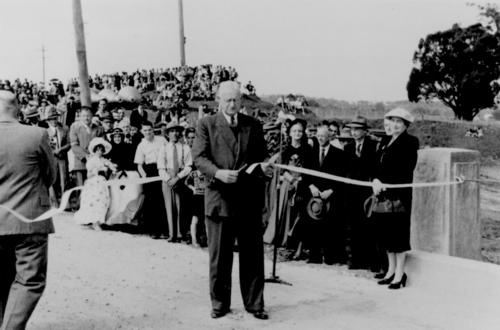
- Tom Plunkett cuts the ribbon at the official opening of the Waterford Bridge, Waterford in 1954

Member of the Queensland Legislative Assembly for Albert
- In office 11 May 1929 – 29 Apr 1950
- Preceded by: John Appel
- Succeeded by: Seat abolished

Member of the Queensland Legislative Assembly for Darlington
- In office 29 Apr 1950 – 3 Aug 1957
- Preceded by: New seat
- Succeeded by: Leslie Harrison

Personal details
- Born: Thomas Flood Plunkett; 19 December 1878 Brisbane, Queensland, Australia
- Died: 24 December 1957 (aged 79) Brisbane, Queensland, Australia
- Resting place: Gleneagle Catholic Cemetery, Beaudesert
- Party: Country Party
- Other political affiliations: CPNP
- Spouse: Margaret Ellen Higgins Deerain (m.1915 d.1983)
- Relations: Thomas Plunkett Sr. (father)
- Occupation: Dairy farmer

Thomas Flood Plunkett CBE (19 December 1878 – 24 December 1957) was a dairy farmer and member of the Queensland Legislative Assembly.

== Biography ==
Plunkett was born at Brisbane, Queensland, to parents Thomas Plunkett and his wife Maria (née Ryan). He went to Tamborine and Beaudesert State Schools before attending St Joseph's College, Gregory Terrace at Spring Hill, Brisbane. He was a good sportsman, and represented the district in cricket and football.

Around 1898 he moved to a family property on the Albert River, at Kerry, near Beaudesert and it into one of the leading dairy farms in the area. He was a founding director of the Logan & Albert Co-operative Dairy Co. Ltd in 1904 and later chairman of the co-operative for over forty years. He was a member and director of many dairy based groups at local, state, and national levels. Plunkett went on several trips to Europe and New Zealand to investigate the latest marketing techniques and the information he bought back was of great benefit to the industry across the nation.

He was a made a Justice of the Peace and in 1957 appointed a CBE for his contributions to the dairy industry. On 12 October 1915 he married Margaret Ellen Higgins (died 1983) at St Mary's Catholic Church, Beaudesert and together had 3 sons and two daughters. He died in Brisbane in December 1957 and was buried at Gleneagle Catholic Cemetery, Beaudesert.

== Political career ==
Plunkett was a member of the Beaudesert Shire Council from 1914 until 1932 including its chairman in 1915–1916. He then followed in his father's footsteps and in 1929 won the seat of Albert in the Queensland Legislative Assembly for the CPNP.

When Albert was abolished for the 1950 state election Plunkett, by now representing the Country Party, moved to the new seat of Darlington and held the seat until his retirement from politics in 1957. His retirement was short as he died less than five months later.

Parliament of Queensland
Preceded by John Appel	Member for Albert; 1929–1950	Abolished
New seat	Member for Darlington; 1950–1957	Succeeded by Leslie Harrison
