= 1956 Queensland state election =

- 19 May 1956

All 75 seats in the Legislative Assembly of Queensland 38 Assembly seats were needed for a majority
- Turnout: 93.01 (▼0.79 pp)
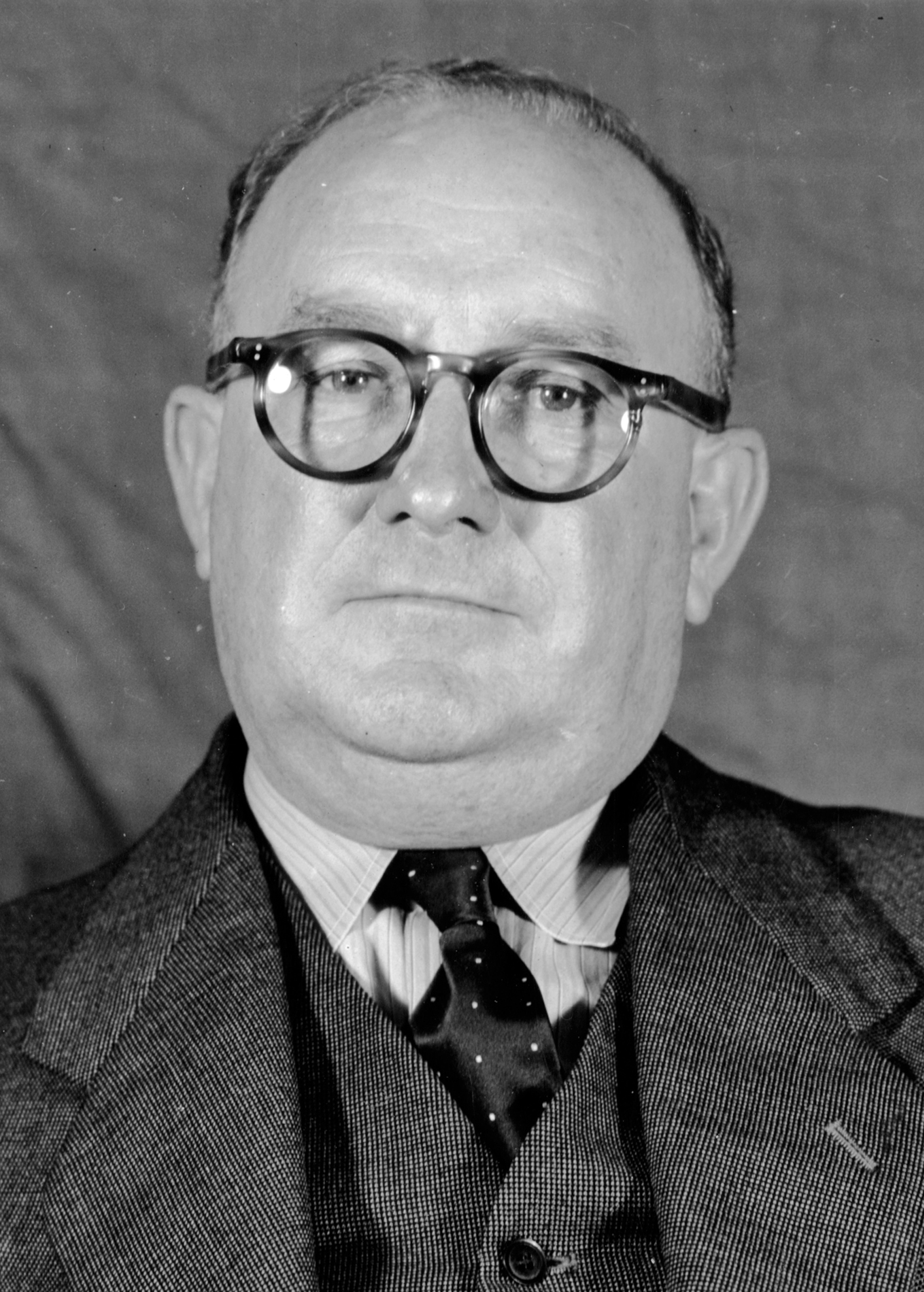

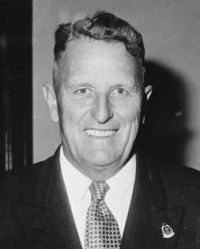
	First party	Second party
Leader	Vince Gair	Frank Nicklin
Party	Labor	Country–Liberal Coalition
Leader since	17 January 1952	21 May 1941
Leader's seat	South Brisbane	Landsborough
Last election	50 seats	23 seats
Seats won	49	24
Seat change	▼1	▲1
Popular vote	335,311	290,299
Percentage	51.22%	44.34%
Swing	▼1.99	▲4.30
Premier before election
Vince Gair
Labor
Elected Premier
Vince Gair
Labor

Elections were held in the Australian state of Queensland on 19 May 1956 to elect the 75 members of the state's Legislative Assembly. The Labor government was seeking its ninth continuous term in office since the 1932 election; it would be Vince Gair's second election as Premier.

Labor would not win another election in the state until 1989.

== Key dates ==
Date	Event
17 April 1956	The Parliament was dissolved.
17 April 1956	Writs were issued by the Governor to proceed with an election.
27 April 1956	Close of nominations.
19 May 1956	Polling day, between the hours of 8am and 6pm.
26 May 1956	Polling day in the seat of Warrego, delayed due to absence of the presiding officer.
28 May 1956	The Gair Ministry was re-sworn in.
2 June 1956	Polling day in the seat of Tablelands, delayed due to floods.
30 June 1956	The writ was returned and the results formally declared.
31 July 1956	Parliament resumed for business.

== Results ==
Queensland state election, 19 May 1956 Legislative Assembly << 1953–1957 >>
Enrolled voters	712,508^{[1]}				
Votes cast	662,680		Turnout	93.01	–0.79
Informal votes	8,006		Informal	1.21	–0.07
Summary of votes by party
Party	Primary votes	%	Swing	Seats	Change
Labor	335,311	51.22	–1.99	49	–1
Liberal	164,116	25.07	+3.77	8	±0
Country	126,183	19.27	+0.53	16	+1
NQ Labor	8,625	1.32	+0.22	1	±0
Communist	1,332	0.20	–0.45	0	±0
Independent Labor	414	0.06	–0.08	0	±0
Independent	18,693	2.86	–0.26	1	±0
Total	654,674			75	

Popular vote
Labor	51.22%
Liberal	25.07%
Country	19.27%
NQ Labor	1.32%
Communist	0.20%
Independents	2.92%

Seats
Labor	65.33%
Country	21.33%
Liberal	10.67%
NQ Labor	1.33%
Independents	1.33%

^{1} 775,258 electors were enrolled to vote at the election, but 6 seats representing 62,750 enrolled voters were unopposed: three Country seats (28,062 voters), two Liberal seats (23,119 voters) and one Labor seat (11,569 voters).

== Seats changing party representation ==
This table lists changes in party representation at the 1956 election.

Seat	Incumbent member	Party	New member	Party
Mackenzie	Paddy Whyte	Labor	Nev Hewitt	Country

== Aftermath ==
This was to be Labor's last successful election until the 1989 election. On 18 April 1957, the Queensland Central Executive of the Labor Party passed a vote of no confidence in Premier Gair, and on 24 April, despite having gained a unanimous vote of support from the Cabinet, he was expelled from the Labor Party. On 26 April, Gair convened a meeting of 25 MLAs, including all of the Cabinet except Deputy Premier John Duggan and two ex-Labor Independents, and formed the Queensland Labor Party (QLP) with those present, while the Labor Party moved to the opposition benches. All these were also expelled from the party. The resulting government was denied supply in parliament, and an election was called for 3 August, at which the QLP government and the Labor Party were defeated by the Country-Liberal coalition led by Frank Nicklin.

== See also ==
- Members of the Queensland Legislative Assembly, 1953–1956
- Members of the Queensland Legislative Assembly, 1956–1957
- Candidates of the Queensland state election, 1956
- Gair Ministry
