= Pat Hanlon =

Australian politician

Member of the Queensland Legislative Assembly for Ithaca
- In office 8 December 1956 – 28 May 1960
- Preceded by: Leonard Eastment
- Succeeded by: Robert Windsor

Member of the Queensland Legislative Assembly for Baroona
- In office 28 May 1960 – 7 December 1974
- Preceded by: Bill Power
- Succeeded by: Dennis Young

Personal details
- Born: Patrick Joseph Hanlon; 19 March 1930 Brisbane, Queensland, Australia
- Died: 30 October 2014 (aged 84) Brisbane, Queensland, Australia
- Party: Labor
- Relations: Ned Hanlon (father)

Patrick Joseph "Pat" Hanlon (19 March 1930 – 30 October 2014) was an Australian politician. He was a Labor member of the Queensland Legislative Assembly from 1956 to 1974, representing the electorates of Ithaca (1956-1960) and Baroona (1960-1974).

Hanlon was born in the Brisbane suburb of Paddington, the son of former Premier Ned Hanlon and his wife Elizabeth (née Carver). He was educated at Marist Brothers College Rosalie, Marist College Ashgrove and the University of Queensland, where he graduated in commerce. After leaving university, he worked as a clerk accountant at the Olympic Tyre and Rubber Company from 1951 until his election to parliament in 1956, at the age of 26.

In July 1956, the Labor member for his father's old seat of Ithaca, Leonard Eastment, died in office, necessitating a by-election. Hanlon was selected as the new Labor candidate and won the seat. Having been elected the year before the 1957 Queensland Labor split, Hanlon was seen as being aligned with the party's industrial wing, rather than the more conservative Cabinet under Vince Gair.

Hanlon switched to the new seat of Baroona at the 1960 election following an electoral redistribution. In 1970, he became Shadow Treasurer under Jack Houston. He retired due to ill health at the 1974 election. Hanlon is sometimes called the "best Labor leader the ALP never had".

He died at Paddington in October 2014.

Parliament of Queensland
Preceded by Leonard Eastment	Member for Ithaca; 1956–1960	Succeeded by Robert Windsor
Preceded by Bill Power	Member for Baroona; 1960–1974	Succeeded by Dennis Young
