= Bill Power (Australian politician) =

Australian politician

The Honourable William Power

Member of the Queensland Legislative Assembly for Baroona
- In office 11 May 1935 – 28 May 1960
- Preceded by: New seat
- Succeeded by: Pat Hanlon

Alderman on the Brisbane City Council for Baroona Ward
- In office until 11 May 1935
- Succeeded by: Walter Russell Crampton

Personal details
- Born: William Joseph Power; 3 January 1893 Brisbane, Queensland, Australia
- Died: 29 May 1974 (aged 81) Brisbane, Queensland, Australia
- Party: Queensland Labor Party
- Other political affiliations: Labor
- Spouse: Alice Gertrude Cain (m.1918 d.1977)
- Occupation: Tramwayman, Trade union official

William Joseph Power (3 January 1893 – 29 May 1974) was a Member of the Queensland Legislative Assembly and an Alderman in the Brisbane City Council.

== Early years ==
Power was born in Brisbane, Queensland to Richard and Margaret Power (née Young) in 1893. He did his schooling in Petrie Terrace and worked as a tramwayman. Power became a leading trade union official before deciding to enter state politics.

== Local politics ==
Power was an Alderman on the Brisbane City Council representing Baroona Ward until he was elected to state parliament in 1935. Walter Russell Crampton was later appointed to fill the vacancy left by his move to state politics.

== State political career ==
Representing the Labor Party, Power won the new seat of Baroona in Labor's landslide win in the Queensland state election of 1935, convincingly defeating J.E. Streeter of the Douglas Credit Party. When campaigning, he used the slogan "Power for the People".

He served as Secretary for Public Works, Housing and Local Government from 1947 to 1950, Secretary for Mines and Immigration from 1950 till 1952, and Attorney-General from 1952 till Labor's defeat from government in 1957. Power sided with Premier Vince Gair after Gair had been expelled by the ALP executive in 1957 and standing for the Queensland Labor Party, he held his seat. He did not seek re-election in 1960 and retired from politics.

== Personal life ==
Power married Alice Gertrude Cain (died 1977) in 1918 and together they had four sons. He was an avid rugby league supporter, and also interested in Game fowl and dogs. He died in 1974.

Parliament of Queensland
New seat	Member for Baroona; 1935–1960	Succeeded by Pat Hanlon
