= Leonard Eastment =

Australian politician

Member of the Queensland Legislative Assembly for Ithaca
- In office 5 April 1952 – 29 July 1956
- Preceded by: Ned Hanlon
- Succeeded by: Pat Hanlon

Personal details
- Born: 28 February 1901 Penygraig, Glamorganshire, Wales
- Died: 29 July 1956 (aged 55) Brisbane, Queensland
- Resting place: Toowong Cemetery
- Party: Labor
- Occupation: Motor mechanic, Transport driver, Hospital employee

Leonard Eastment (28 February 1901 – 29 July 1956) was an Australian politician. He was the Labor member for Ithaca in the Legislative Assembly of Queensland from 1952 to 1956.

Eastment died while in office and was buried in Toowong Cemetery.

Preceded by Ned Hanlon	Member for Ithaca; 1952–1956	Succeeded by Pat Hanlon
