= Electoral district of Brisbane (Queensland) =

Former state electoral district of Queensland, Australia

Brisbane Queensland—Legislative Assembly
- State: Queensland
- Dates current: 1912–1977
- Namesake: Brisbane

Brisbane was an electoral district of the Legislative Assembly in the Australian state of Queensland from 1912 to 1977.

Based in inner central Brisbane, north of the Brisbane River, it was first created as a single member constituency for the 1912 state election, largely replacing the dual member constituency of Brisbane North. It was abolished at the 1977 state election and replaced by the new district of Brisbane Central.

It was historically a safe seat for the Labor Party.

== Members for Brisbane ==
Member	Party	Term
Mick Kirwan	Labor	1912–1932
Robert Funnell	Labor	1932–1936
Johnno Mann	Labor	1936–1969
Brian Davis	Labor	1969–1974
Harold Lowes	Liberal	1974–1977

== See also ==
- Electoral district of Brisbane City, which existed 1873 to 1878
- Electoral districts of Queensland
- Members of the Queensland Legislative Assembly by year
- Category:Members of the Queensland Legislative Assembly by name
