= Electoral district of Ithaca =

Former state electoral district of Queensland, Australia

Ithaca Queensland—Legislative Assembly
- State: Queensland
- Created: 1912
- Abolished: 1986
- Namesake: Ithaca Creek

Ithaca was an electoral district of the Legislative Assembly in the Australian state of Queensland from 1912 to 1986.

It mostly covered the inner northwest suburbs of Brisbane, including Red Hill and Paddington. It was named after the Ithaca Creek.

Ithaca was at first a safe Labor seat, but was won and retained for the rest of its existence by the Liberal party in the 1960 election. It was the seat of Premier Ned Hanlon from 1926 until his death in 1952.

Ithaca was abolished in the redistribution before the 1986 election, and its area mostly taken up by the district of Mount Coot-tha.

== Members for Ithaca ==
Member	Party	Term
John Gilday	Labor	1912–1926
Ned Hanlon	Labor	1926–1952
Leonard Eastment	Labor	1952–1956
Pat Hanlon	Labor	1956–1960
Bob Windsor	Liberal	1960–1966
Col Miller	Liberal	1966–1984
Col Miller	Independent	1984–1986

== See also ==
- Electoral districts of Queensland
- Members of the Queensland Legislative Assembly by year
- Category:Members of the Queensland Legislative Assembly by name
