= Electoral results for the district of Cook =

Queensland, Australia, district election results

This is a list of electoral results for the electoral district of Cook in Queensland state elections.

== Members for Cook ==
First incarnation (1876–1878, 1 member)
Member	Party	Term
William Edward Murphy	Unaligned	1876–1878
Second incarnation (1878–1888, 2 members)
Member	Party	Term
John Walsh	Unaligned	1878–1883
Frederick Cooper	Unaligned	1878–1884
John Hamilton	Ministerialist	1883–1888
Thomas Campbell	Unaligned	1884–1885
Charles Lumley Hill	Unaligned	1885–1888
Third incarnation (1888–present, 1 member)
Member	Party	Term
John Hamilton	Ministerialist	1888–1904
John Hargreaves	Ministerialist	1904–1907
Henry Douglas	Ministerialist / Opposition / Independent Opposition / Ministerialist / Liberal	1907–1915
Henry Ryan	Labor	1915–1929
James Kenny	Country and Progressive National	1929–1935
Harold Collins	Labor	1935–1950
Carlisle Wordsworth	Country	1950–1953
Bunny Adair	Labor	1953–1957
Bunny Adair	Queensland Labor	1957–1963
Bunny Adair	Independent	1963–1969
Bill Wood	Labor	1969–1972
Edwin Wallis-Smith	Labor	1972–1974
Eric Deeral	National	1974–1977
Bob Scott	Labor	1977–1989
Steve Bredhauer	Labor	1989–2004
Jason O'Brien	Labor	2004–2012
David Kempton	Liberal National	2012–2015
Billy Gordon	Labor	2015
Billy Gordon	Independent	2015–2017
Cynthia Lui	Labor	2017–2024
David Kempton	Liberal National	2024–present

== Election results ==
=== Elections in the 2020s ===
2024 Queensland state election: Cook
Party	Candidate	Votes	%	±%
Labor	Cynthia Lui	8,744	33.34	−6.68
Liberal National	David Kempton	8,728	33.28	+9.18
Katter's Australian	Duane Amos	5,158	19.67	+2.45
One Nation	Peter Campion	1,832	6.98	+0.35
Greens	Troy Miller	1,765	6.73	+1.69
Total formal votes		26,227	95.72	+0.03
Informal votes		1,172	4.28	−0.03
Turnout		27,399	74.88	−4.91
Two-party-preferred result
Liberal National	David Kempton	14,419	54.98	+11.24
Labor	Cynthia Lui	11,808	45.02	−11.24
Liberal National gain from Labor		Swing	+11.24	

2020 Queensland state election: Cook
Party	Candidate	Votes	%	±%
Labor	Cynthia Lui	10,363	40.02	−0.08
Liberal National	Ed (Nipper) Brown	6,241	24.10	+6.35
Katter's Australian	Tanika Parker	4,458	17.22	+0.24
One Nation	Brett (Beaver) Neal	1,717	6.63	−11.78
Greens	Deby Ruddell	1,306	5.04	−1.71
Independent	Yodie Batzke	1,000	3.86	+3.86
NQ First	Desmond Tayley	624	2.41	+2.41
United Australia	Stephen Goulmy	184	0.71	+0.71
Total formal votes		25,893	95.69	−0.04
Informal votes		1,167	4.31	+0.04
Turnout		27,060	79.79	−1.47
Two-party-preferred result
Labor	Cynthia Lui	14,567	56.26	−1.90
Liberal National	Ed (Nipper) Brown	11,326	43.74	+1.90
Labor hold		Swing	−1.90	

=== Elections in the 2010s ===
2017 Queensland state election: Cook
Party	Candidate	Votes	%	±%
Labor	Cynthia Lui	10,105	40.1	−0.3
One Nation	Jen Sackley	4,639	18.4	+18.4
Liberal National	Penny Johnson	4,475	17.8	−15.9
Katter's Australian	Gordon Rasmussen	4,278	17.0	+4.5
Greens	Brynn Mathews	1,703	6.8	+1.4
Total formal votes		25,200	95.7	−2.3
Informal votes		1,124	4.3	+2.3
Turnout		26,324	81.3	+0.1
Two-candidate-preferred result
Labor	Cynthia Lui	14,071	55.8	−1.0
One Nation	Jen Sackley	11,129	44.2	+44.2
Labor hold		Swing	−1.0	

2015 Queensland state election: Cook
Party	Candidate	Votes	%	±%
Labor	Billy Gordon	10,119	40.41	+7.99
Liberal National	David Kempton	8,424	33.64	−3.87
Katter's Australian	Lee Marriott	3,134	12.52	−9.83
Palmer United	Jason Booth	1,678	6.70	+6.70
Greens	Daryl Desjardin	1,353	5.40	−0.10
Independent	Michaelangelo Newie	332	1.33	+1.33
Total formal votes		25,040	98.05	−0.44
Informal votes		497	1.95	+0.44
Turnout		25,537	86.24	−0.03
Two-party-preferred result
Labor	Billy Gordon	12,527	56.77	+10.20
Liberal National	David Kempton	9,540	43.23	−10.20
Labor gain from Liberal National		Swing	+10.20	

2012 Queensland state election: Cook
Party	Candidate	Votes	%	±%
Liberal National	David Kempton	8,832	37.51	−4.90
Labor	Jason O'Brien	7,634	32.42	−13.63
Katter's Australian	Lachlan Bensted	5,261	22.34	+22.34
Greens	George Riley	1,295	5.50	−1.15
One Nation	James Evans	524	2.23	+2.23
Total formal votes		23,546	98.49	+0.29
Informal votes		361	1.51	−0.29
Turnout		23,907	86.26	+0.43
Two-party-preferred result
Liberal National	David Kempton	10,563	53.43	+5.67
Labor	Jason O'Brien	9,205	46.57	−5.67
Liberal National gain from Labor		Swing	+5.67	

=== Elections in the 2000s ===
2009 Queensland state election: Cook
Party	Candidate	Votes	%	±%
Labor	Jason O'Brien	10,456	46.0	−4.3
Liberal National	Craig Batchelor	9,629	42.4	+12.7
Greens	Neville St John-Wood	1,510	6.7	−0.3
Independent	Michaelangelo Newie	1,111	4.9	+4.9
Total formal votes		22,706	98.1	
Informal votes		417	1.9	
Turnout		23,123	85.8	
Two-party-preferred result
Labor	Jason O'Brien	11,217	52.2	−9.2
Liberal National	Craig Batchelor	10,253	47.8	+9.2
Labor hold		Swing	−9.2	

2006 Queensland state election: Cook
Party	Candidate	Votes	%	±%
Labor	Jason O'Brien	9,806	57.8	+15.8
National	Peter Scott	5,400	31.8	+0.8
Greens	Neville St John-Wood	1,767	10.4	+3.7
Total formal votes		16,973	98.1	−0.2
Informal votes		334	1.9	+0.2
Turnout		17,307	82.4	−1.9
Two-party-preferred result
Labor	Jason O'Brien	10,661	65.1	+7.6
National	Peter Scott	5,709	34.9	−7.6
Labor hold		Swing	+7.6	

2004 Queensland state election: Cook
Party	Candidate	Votes	%	±%
Labor	Jason O'Brien	7,346	42.0	−21.8
National	Graham Elmes	5,420	31.0	+15.5
Independent	Bruce Gibson	2,572	14.7	+14.7
Greens	Neville St John-Wood	1,167	6.7	+6.7
One Nation	David Ballestrin	966	5.5	−15.1
Total formal votes		17,471	98.3	+0.0
Informal votes		294	1.7	−0.0
Turnout		17,765	84.3	−2.9
Two-party-preferred result
Labor	Jason O'Brien	8,746	57.5	−15.4
National	Graham Elmes	6,477	42.5	+42.5
Labor hold		Swing	−15.4	

2001 Queensland state election: Cook
Party	Candidate	Votes	%	±%
Labor	Steve Bredhauer	10,727	63.8	+10.4
One Nation	Alan Webb	3,465	20.6	+0.5
National	Lloyd Hollingsworth	2,610	15.5	−1.4
Total formal votes		16,802	98.3	
Informal votes		282	1.7	
Turnout		17,084	87.2	
Two-candidate-preferred result
Labor	Steve Bredhauer	11,175	72.9	+7.8
One Nation	Alan Webb	4,162	27.1	−7.8
Labor hold		Swing	+7.8	

=== Elections in the 1990s ===
1998 Queensland state election: Cook
Party	Candidate	Votes	%	±%
Labor	Steve Bredhauer	8,370	54.6	+2.1
One Nation	Carmel Mitchell	3,124	20.4	+20.4
National	Terry Cranwell	2,989	19.5	−16.6
Independent	Edgar Williams	482	3.1	−3.4
Reform	Smiley Burnett	351	2.3	+2.3
Total formal votes		15,316	98.6	+0.6
Informal votes		218	1.4	−0.6
Turnout		15,534	86.8	+3.4
Two-candidate-preferred result
Labor	Steve Bredhauer	9,507	65.5	+7.8
One Nation	Carmel Mitchell	5,002	34.5	+34.5
Labor hold		Swing	+7.8	

1995 Queensland state election: Cook
Party	Candidate	Votes	%	±%
Labor	Steve Bredhauer	7,603	52.6	+3.6
National	Terry Cranwell	5,220	36.1	+11.1
Independent	Edgar Williams	945	6.5	+6.5
Democrats	Trevor Tim	689	4.8	+4.8
Total formal votes		14,457	98.0	+0.4
Informal votes		297	2.0	−0.4
Turnout		14,754	83.4	
Two-party-preferred result
Labor	Steve Bredhauer	8,118	57.7	−4.5
National	Terry Cranwell	5,953	42.3	+4.5
Labor hold		Swing	−4.5	

1992 Queensland state election: Cook
Party	Candidate	Votes	%	±%
Labor	Steve Bredhauer	6,794	49.0	+2.8
National	John Weightman	3,465	25.0	−1.1
Liberal	David Spanagel	1,321	9.5	+1.4
Independent	David Byrne	1,000	7.2	−0.1
Independent	George Villaflor	586	4.2	+4.2
Indigenous Peoples	Merv Gibson	373	2.7	+2.7
Indigenous Peoples	Norman Johnson	180	1.3	+1.3
Independent	Anton Castro	141	1.0	+1.0
Total formal votes		13,860	97.6	
Informal votes		343	2.4	
Turnout		14,203	85.8	
Two-party-preferred result
Labor	Steve Bredhauer	7,883	62.2	+4.1
National	John Weightman	4,794	37.8	−4.1
Labor hold		Swing	+4.1	

=== Elections in the 1980s ===
1989 Queensland state election: Cook
Party	Candidate	Votes	%	±%
Labor	Steve Bredhauer	4,305	43.1	−23.5
National	Lester Rosendale	2,208	22.1	−11.3
Independent	David Byrne	979	9.8	+9.8
Independent	James Akee	910	9.1	+9.1
Liberal	Bill Rutherford	706	7.1	+7.1
Independent	Dan Paterson	564	5.7	+5.7
Independent	Norman Johnson	313	3.1	+3.1
Total formal votes		9,985	92.8	−3.0
Informal votes		769	7.2	+3.0
Turnout		10,754	80.6	−1.7
Two-party-preferred result
Labor	Steve Bredhauer	5,881	58.9	−7.7
National	Lester Rosendale	4,104	41.1	+7.7
Labor hold		Swing	−7.7	

1986 Queensland state election: Cook
Party	Candidate	Votes	%	±%
Labor	Bob Scott	5,629	66.7	+1.3
National	Getano Lui	2,816	33.3	−1.3
Total formal votes		8,445	95.8	
Informal votes		372	4.2	
Turnout		8,817	82.3	
Labor hold		Swing	+1.3	

1983 Queensland state election: Cook
Party	Candidate	Votes	%	±%
Labor	Bob Scott	5,373	63.5	+3.7
National	Patrick Killoran	1,779	21.0	−9.8
National	James Wilkinson	1,309	15.5	+15.5
Total formal votes		8,461	98.0	+0.1
Informal votes		171	2.0	−0.1
Turnout		8,632	84.0	+2.7
Two-party-preferred result
Labor	Bob Scott	5,373	63.5	+1.1
National	Patrick Killoran	3,088	36.5	−1.1
Labor hold		Swing	+1.1	

1980 Queensland state election: Cook
Party	Candidate	Votes	%	±%
Labor	Bob Scott	4,263	59.8	+11.4
National	D.A. Young	1,282	18.0	−23.2
National	Justin Smith	912	12.8	+12.8
Liberal	Evelyn Scott	669	9.4	+9.4
Total formal votes		7,126	97.9	+0.1
Informal votes		155	2.1	−0.1
Turnout		7,281	81.3	−1.4
Two-party-preferred result
Labor	Bob Scott	4,447	62.4	+8.5
National	D.A. Young	2,679	37.6	−8.5
Labor hold		Swing	+8.5	

=== Elections in the 1970s ===
1977 Queensland state election: Cook
Party	Candidate	Votes	%	±%
Labor	Bob Scott	3,317	48.4	+12.8
National	Eric Deeral	2,841	41.5	+19.0
Australian Advancement Party	Ted Loban	690	10.1	+10.1
Total formal votes		6,848	97.8	
Informal votes		154	2.2	
Turnout		7,002	82.7	
Two-party-preferred result
Labor	Bob Scott	3,693	53.9	+6.5
National	Eric Deeral	3,155	46.1	−6.5
Labor gain from National		Swing	+6.5	

1974 Queensland state election: Cook
Party	Candidate	Votes	%	±%
Labor	Bob Scott	2,339	35.6	−15.2
National	Eric Deeral	1,477	22.5	+22.5
National	Terrence Mahoney	1,394	21.2	+21.2
Independent	Percy Trezise	566	8.6	+8.6
Liberal	Keith Hollands	466	7.1	+7.1
Australian Advancement	Patrick O'Shane	217	3.3	+3.3
Independent	Graham Gordon	115	1.8	+1.8
Total formal votes		6,574	94.2	−2.7
Informal votes		403	5.8	+2.7
Turnout		6,977	84.3	−0.2
Two-party-preferred result
National	Eric Deeral	3,459	52.6	+6.8
Labor	Bob Scott	3,115	47.4	−6.8
National gain from Labor		Swing	+6.8	

1972 Queensland state election: Cook
Party	Candidate	Votes	%	±%
Labor	Edwin Wallis-Smith	3,071	50.8	−2.1
Country	Graham Gordon	1,749	28.9	−10.6
Queensland Labor	Benjamin Nona	1,221	20.2	+18.3
Total formal votes		6,041	96.9	
Informal votes		194	3.1	
Turnout		6,235	84.5	
Two-party-preferred result
Labor	Edwin Wallis-Smith	3,277	54.2	+0.9
Country	Graham Gordon	2,764	45.8	−0.9
Labor hold		Swing	+0.9	

=== Elections in the 1960s ===
1969 Queensland state election: Cook
Party	Candidate	Votes	%	±%
Labor	Bill Wood	6,154	52.9	+8.1
Country	James Bidner	4,593	39.5	+39.5
Independent	John Allan	507	4.4	+4.4
Queensland Labor	Thomas White	227	1.9	+1.9
Independent	Ernest Hall	146	1.3	+1.3
Total formal votes		11,627	96.4	−2.1
Informal votes		435	3.6	+2.1
Turnout		12,062	90.0	−1.3
Two-party-preferred result
Labor	Bill Wood	6,522	56.1	+11.3
Country	James Bidner	5,105	43.9	+43.9
Labor gain from Independent		Swing	+11.3	

1966 Queensland state election: Cook
Party	Candidate	Votes	%	±%
Independent	Bunny Adair	6,097	55.2	+0.5
Labor	Jack Bethel	4,951	44.8	−0.5
Total formal votes		11,048	98.5	+0.8
Informal votes		172	1.5	−0.8
Turnout		11,220	91.3	+0.2
Independent hold		Swing	+0.5	

1963 Queensland state election: Cook
Party	Candidate	Votes	%	±%
Independent	Bunny Adair	4,687	54.7	+54.7
Labor	Jack Bethel	3,875	45.3	+10.1
Total formal votes		8,562	97.7	−1.2
Informal votes		199	2.3	+1.2
Turnout		8,761	91.1	+1.2
Independent gain from Queensland Labor		Swing	N/A	

1960 Queensland state election: Cook
Party	Candidate	Votes	%	±%
Queensland Labor	Bunny Adair	3,063	39.2	
Labor	John Bethel	2,753	35.2	
Country	William Simms	2,003	25.6	
Total formal votes		7,819	98.9	
Informal votes		88	1.1	
Turnout		7,907	89.9	
Queensland Labor hold		Swing		

=== Elections in the 1950s ===
1957 Queensland state election: Cook
Party	Candidate	Votes	%	±%
Queensland Labor	Bunny Adair	4,013	44.2	+44.2
Country	Carlisle Wordsworth	3,463	38.1	+1.7
Labor	Seymour Chataway	1,607	17.7	−45.9
Total formal votes		9,083	99.1	+0.3
Informal votes		82	0.9	−0.3
Turnout		9,165	92.7	+3.5
Queensland Labor gain from Labor		Swing	N/A	

1956 Queensland state election: Cook
Party	Candidate	Votes	%	±%
Labor	Bunny Adair	5,433	63.6	+10.5
Country	John Crossland	3,110	36.4	−10.5
Total formal votes		8,543	98.8	0.0
Informal votes		103	1.2	0.0
Turnout		8,646	89.2	−0.6
Labor hold		Swing	+10.5	

1953 Queensland state election: Cook
Party	Candidate	Votes	%	±%
Labor	Bunny Adair	4,135	53.1	+3.9
Country	Carlisle Wordsworth	3,658	46.9	−3.9
Total formal votes		7,793	98.8	−0.1
Informal votes		93	1.2	+0.1
Turnout		7,886	89.8	+1.6
Labor gain from Country		Swing	+3.9	

1950 Queensland state election: Cook
Party	Candidate	Votes	%	±%
Country	Carlisle Wordsworth	3,811	50.8	
Labor	Jim Tully	3,690	49.2	
Total formal votes		7,501	98.9	
Informal votes		80	1.1	
Turnout		7,581	88.2	
Country gain from Labor		Swing		

=== Elections in the 1940s ===
1947 Queensland state election: Cook
Party	Candidate	Votes	%	±%
Labor	Harold Collins	4,388	55.7	+1.1
Country	Charles Griffin	3,485	44.3	+44.3
Total formal votes		7,873	98.4	+0.1
Informal votes		125	1.6	−0.1
Turnout		7,998	88.9	+6.9
Labor hold		Swing	−10.1	

1944 Queensland state election: Cook
Party	Candidate	Votes	%	±%
Labor	Harold Collins	3,845	54.6	−2.4
People's Party	Norman Fitchett	1,999	28.4	+28.4
Independent Labor	Jack Meehan	1,205	17.1	+17.1
Total formal votes		7,049	98.3	+2.9
Informal votes		119	1.7	−2.9
Turnout		7,168	82.0	−7.0
Labor hold		Swing	+8.8	

1941 Queensland state election: Cook
Party	Candidate	Votes	%	±%
Labor	Harold Collins	4,388	57.0	−2.0
Country	James McDonald	3,315	43.0	+9.2
Total formal votes		7,703	95.4	−2.6
Informal votes		368	4.6	+2.6
Turnout		8,071	89.0	−1.4
Labor hold		Swing	−6.5	

=== Elections in the 1930s ===
1938 Queensland state election: Cook
Party	Candidate	Votes	%	±%
Labor	Harold Collins	4,485	59.0	+5.3
Country	George Weaver	2,574	33.8	+7.8
Social Credit	Joseph Mears	547	7.2	−13.1
Total formal votes		7,606	98.0	−0.4
Informal votes		157	2.0	+0.4
Turnout		7,763	90.4	−0.3
Labor hold		Swing	N/A	

- Preferences were not distributed.

1935 Queensland state election: Cook
Party	Candidate	Votes	%	±%
Labor	Harold Collins	4,051	53.7	
CPNP	Ernest Atherton	1,965	26.0	
Social Credit	Richard Boorman	1,528	20.3	
Total formal votes		7,544	98.4	
Informal votes		122	1.6	
Turnout		7,666	90.7	
Labor gain from CPNP		Swing		

- Preferences were not distributed.

1932 Queensland state election: Cook
Party	Candidate	Votes	%	±%
CPNP	James Kenny	3,742	50.4	
Labor	William Gardner	3,684	49.6	
Total formal votes		7,426	98.7	
Informal votes		94	1.3	
Turnout		7,520	92.9	
CPNP hold		Swing		

=== Elections in the 1920s ===
1929 Queensland state election: Cook
Party	Candidate	Votes	%	±%
CPNP	James Kenny	2,046	52.8	+14.8
Labor	Harry Ryan	1,830	47.2	−14.8
Total formal votes		3,876	99.1	+0.6
Informal votes		35	0.9	−0.6
Turnout		3,911	85.3	−0.9
CPNP gain from Labor		Swing	+14.8	

1926 Queensland state election: Cook
Party	Candidate	Votes	%	±%
Labor	Harry Ryan	2,422	62.0	+10.2
CPNP	Thomas Kilpatrick	1,760	38.0	−10.2
Total formal votes		3,909	98.5	−0.5
Informal votes		59	1.5	+0.5
Turnout		3,968	86.2	+9.3
Labor hold		Swing	+10.2	

1923 Queensland state election: Cook
Party	Candidate	Votes	%	±%
Labor	Harry Ryan	1,888	51.8	−4.1
United	Thomas Kilpatrick	1,760	48.2	+4.1
Total formal votes		3,648	99.0	+0.6
Informal votes		36	1.0	−0.6
Turnout		3,684	76.9	+4.2
Labor hold		Swing	−4.1	

1920 Queensland state election: Cook
Party	Candidate	Votes	%	±%
Labor	Henry Ryan	1,475	55.9	−4.7
Northern Country	Frederick Craig	1,166	44.1	+44.1
Total formal votes		2,641	98.4	−1.7
Informal votes		42	1.6	+1.7
Turnout		2,683	72.7	−1.4
Labor hold		Swing	−4.7	

=== Elections in the 1910s ===
1918 Queensland state election: Cook
Party	Candidate	Votes	%	±%
Labor	Henry Ryan	1,621	60.6	+6.7
National	Walter Anderson	1,054	39.4	−6.7
Total formal votes		2,675	96.7	−1.4
Informal votes		90	3.3	+1.4
Turnout		2,765	74.1	−11.1
Labor hold		Swing	+6.7	

1915 Queensland state election: Cook
Party	Candidate	Votes	%	±%
Labor	Henry Ryan	1,407	53.9	+12.2
Liberal	Henry Douglas	1,203	46.1	−12.2
Total formal votes		2,610	98.1	−1.0
Informal votes		50	1.9	+1.0
Turnout		2,660	85.2	+8.3
Labor gain from Liberal		Swing	+12.2	

1912 Queensland state election: Cook
Party	Candidate	Votes	%	±%
Liberal	Henry Douglas	1,393	58.3	
Labor	Harry Ryan	996	41.7	
Total formal votes		2,389	99.2	
Informal votes		20	0.8	
Turnout		2,409	76.9	
Liberal hold		Swing		
