= Electoral results for the district of Tablelands =

Queensland, Australia, district election results

This is a list of electoral results for the electoral district of Tablelands in Queensland state elections.

== Members for Tablelands ==
First incarnation (1950–1972)
Member	Party	Term
Harold Collins	Labor	1950–1957
Harold Collins	Queensland Labor	1957
Tom Gilmore, Sr.	Country	1957–1963
Edwin Wallis-Smith	Labor	1963–1972
Second incarnation (1986–2009)
Member	Party	Term
Tom Gilmore, Jr.	National	1986–1998
Shaun Nelson	One Nation	1998–1999
Shaun Nelson	Independent	1999–2001
Rosa Lee Long	One Nation	2001–2009

== Election results ==
=== Elections in the 2000s ===
2006 Queensland state election: Tablelands
Party	Candidate	Votes	%	±%
One Nation	Rosa Lee Long	10,812	50.06	+3.10
Labor	Denis McKinley	4,856	22.48	−4.02
National	George Adil	4,574	21.18	−5.36
Greens	Paul Parker	789	3.65	+3.65
Family First	Troy Howard	567	2.63	+2.63
Total formal votes		21,598	98.20	+0.21
Informal votes		395	1.80	−0.21
Turnout		21,993	90.30	−1.39
Two-candidate-preferred result
One Nation	Rosa Lee Long	12,721	69.77	+7.36
Labor	Denis McKinley	5,512	30.23	+30.23
One Nation hold		Swing	+7.36	

2004 Queensland state election: Tablelands
Party	Candidate	Votes	%	±%
One Nation	Rosa Lee Long	10,140	46.96	+10.97
National	Cheryl Tonkin	5,730	26.54	+10.13
Labor	Arthur Yates	5,721	26.50	+1.68
Total formal votes		21,591	97.99	−0.57
Informal votes		443	2.01	+0.57
Turnout		22,034	91.69	−1.16
Two-candidate-preferred result
One Nation	Rosa Lee Long	10,955	62.41	−1.40
National	Cheryl Tonkin	6,598	37.59	+37.59
One Nation hold		Swing	−1.40	

2001 Queensland state election: Tablelands
Party	Candidate	Votes	%	±%
One Nation	Rosa Lee Long	7,722	36.0	−6.0
Labor	Arthur Yates	5,325	24.8	−0.2
National	Joe Moro	3,522	16.4	−16.6
Independent	Shaun Nelson	3,284	15.3	+15.3
Independent	Henry Condon	1,098	5.1	+5.1
Independent	Alan Isherwood	507	2.4	+2.4
Total formal votes		21,458	98.6	
Informal votes		313	1.4	
Turnout		21,771	92.9	
Two-candidate-preferred result
One Nation	Rosa Lee Long	10,994	63.8	+13.6
Labor	Arthur Yates	6,235	36.2	+36.2
One Nation hold		Swing	+13.6	

=== Elections in the 1990s ===
1998 Queensland state election: Tablelands
Party	Candidate	Votes	%	±%
One Nation	Shaun Nelson	8,335	42.0	+42.0
National	Tom Gilmore	6,521	32.9	−36.5
Labor	Nigel Tucker	4,973	25.1	+0.6
Total formal votes		19,829	98.8	+0.5
Informal votes		230	1.2	−0.5
Turnout		20,059	92.6	+2.9
Two-candidate-preferred result
One Nation	Shaun Nelson	9,106	50.3	+50.3
National	Tom Gilmore	9,006	49.7	−23.3
One Nation gain from National		Swing	+50.3	

1995 Queensland state election: Tablelands
Party	Candidate	Votes	%	±%
National	Tom Gilmore	13,202	69.4	+10.8
Labor	Anthony Shearer	4,652	24.5	−8.3
Democrats	Andrew Howell	839	4.4	+4.4
Independent	Jehan Hainaut	328	1.7	+1.7
Total formal votes		19,021	98.3	+0.0
Informal votes		325	1.7	−0.0
Turnout		19,420	90.8	−1.1
Two-party-preferred result
National	Tom Gilmore	13,698	73.0	+8.6
Labor	Anthony Shearer	5,078	27.0	−8.6
National hold		Swing	+8.6	

1992 Queensland state election: Tablelands
Party	Candidate	Votes	%	±%
National	Tom Gilmore	11,189	58.6	+10.1
Labor	Fred Cattarossi	6,257	32.8	−10.9
Confederate Action	Michael Sheather	1,642	8.6	+8.6
Total formal votes		19,088	98.3	
Informal votes		332	1.7	
Turnout		19,420	90.8	
Two-party-preferred result
National	Tom Gilmore	11,934	64.4	+10.5
Labor	Fred Cattarossi	6,608	35.6	−10.5
National hold		Swing	+10.5	

=== Elections in the 1980s ===
1989 Queensland state election: Tablelands
Party	Candidate	Votes	%	±%
National	Tom Gilmore	6,518	47.8	−3.3
Labor	Fred Cattarossi	6,219	45.6	+8.3
Citizens Electoral Council	Andrew Snowdon	888	6.5	+6.5
Total formal votes		13,625	96.5	−0.7
Informal votes		500	3.5	+0.7
Turnout		12,638	90.6	+0.3
Two-party-preferred result
National	Tom Gilmore	7,142	52.4	−6.3
Labor	Fred Cattarossi	6,483	47.6	+6.3
National hold		Swing	−6.3	

1986 Queensland state election: Tablelands
Party	Candidate	Votes	%	±%
National	Tom Gilmore	6,281	51.1	
Labor	James Mealing	4,586	37.3	
Liberal	Richard Male	994	8.1	
Independent	Ralph Reese	430	3.5	
Total formal votes		12,291	97.2	
Informal votes		347	2.8	
Turnout		12,638	90.6	
Two-party-preferred result
National	Tom Gilmore	7,215	58.7	+4.2
Labor	James Mealing	5,076	41.3	−4.2
National hold		Swing	+4.2	

=== Elections in the 1960s ===
1969 Queensland state election: Tablelands
Party	Candidate	Votes	%	±%
Labor	Edwin Wallis-Smith	3,759	52.4	−3.2
Country	Micheli Borzi	3,410	47.6	+5.3
Total formal votes		7,169	97.7	0.0
Informal votes		166	2.3	0.0
Turnout		7,335	89.1	+1.4
Labor hold		Swing	−3.6	

1966 Queensland state election: Tablelands
Party	Candidate	Votes	%	±%
Labor	Edwin Wallis-Smith	3,747	55.6	+4.0
Country	Tom Gilmore	2,853	42.4	−1.0
Queensland Labor	V. Rehbein	137	2.0	+0.2
Total formal votes		6,737	97.7	+1.1
Informal votes		161	2.3	−1.1
Turnout		6,898	87.7	−1.6
Two-party-preferred result
Labor	Edwin Wallis-Smith	3,772	56.0	+2.5
Country	Tom Gilmore	2,965	44.0	−2.5
Labor hold		Swing	+2.5	

1963 Queensland state election: Tablelands
Party	Candidate	Votes	%	±%
Labor	Edwin Wallis-Smith	3,281	51.6	+11.2
Country	Tom Gilmore	2,761	43.4	−9.4
Independent	Dino Bertoldo	204	3.2	+3.2
Queensland Labor	Leo McManus	116	1.8	−5.0
Total formal votes		6,362	96.6	−1.5
Informal votes		221	3.4	+1.5
Turnout		6,583	89.3	+1.3
Two-party-preferred result
Labor	Edwin Wallis-Smith	3,405	53.5	
Country	Tom Gilmore	2,957	46.5	
Labor gain from Country		Swing	N/A	

1960 Queensland state election: Tablelands
Party	Candidate	Votes	%	±%
Country	Tom Gilmore	3,438	52.8	
Labor	Edwin Wallis-Smith	2,633	40.4	
Queensland Labor	Arthur Mottarelly	442	6.8	
Total formal votes		6,513	98.1	
Informal votes		123	1.9	
Turnout		6,636	87.4	
Country hold		Swing		

=== Elections in the 1950s ===
1957 Queensland state election: Tablelands
Party	Candidate	Votes	%	±%
Country	Tom Gilmore	3,359	37.5	+3.9
Queensland Labor	Harold Collins	3,279	36.6	+36.6
Labor	Sidney Tullipan	2,321	25.9	−40.5
Total formal votes		8,959	99.3	+0.4
Informal votes		64	0.7	−0.4
Turnout		9,023	92.3	+1.7
Country gain from Labor		Swing	N/A	

1956 Queensland state election: Tablelands
Party	Candidate	Votes	%	±%
Labor	Harold Collins	5,547	66.4	+0.1
Country	Clarence West	2,803	33.6	+2.7
Total formal votes		8,350	98.9	−0.2
Informal votes		96	1.1	+0.2
Turnout		8,446	90.6	−0.8
Labor hold		Swing	−1.3	

1953 Queensland state election: Tablelands
Party	Candidate	Votes	%	±%
Labor	Harold Collins	5,165	66.3	+12.7
Country	James Baldock	2,412	30.9	−8.9
Communist	Richard Anear	217	2.8	+2.8
Total formal votes		7,794	99.1	−0.2
Informal votes		72	0.9	+0.2
Turnout		7,866	91.4	+1.5
Labor hold		Swing	+10.8	

1950 Queensland state election: Tablelands
Party	Candidate	Votes	%	±%
Labor	Harold Collins	4,033	53.6	
Country	John Gargan	2,992	39.8	
NQ Labor	Tom Mackey	496	6.6	
Total formal votes		7,521	99.3	
Informal votes		50	0.7	
Turnout		7,571	89.9	
Labor hold		Swing		
