= Results of the 1983 Queensland state election =

Queensland state election, 22 October 1983 Legislative Assembly << 1980–1986 >>
Enrolled voters	1,458,205				
Votes cast	1,336,985		Turnout	91.69%	+2.76%
Informal votes	19,591		Informal	1.47%	–0.04%
Summary of votes by party
Party	Primary votes	%	Swing	Seats	Change
Labor	579,363	43.98%	+2.49%	32	+7
National	512,890	38.93%	+10.99%	41	+6
Liberal	196,072	14.88%	–12.04%	8	–14
Democrats	10,926	0.83%	–0.55%	0	±0
Progress	741	0.06%	–0.31%	0	±0
Independent	16,994	1.29%	–0.49%	1	+1
Others	408	0.03%	–0.09%	0	±0
Total	1,317,394			82	

This is a list of electoral district results for the 1983 Queensland state election.

== Results by electoral district ==
=== Albert ===
1983 Queensland state election: Albert
Party	Candidate	Votes	%	±%
National	Ivan Gibbs	14,595	56.5	+11.7
Labor	Walter Ehrich	11,239	43.5	+9.8
Total formal votes		25,834	97.6	−0.5
Informal votes		639	2.4	+0.5
Turnout		26,473	89.1	+3.2
National hold		Swing	−4.4	

=== Archerfield ===
1983 Queensland state election: Archerfield
Party	Candidate	Votes	%	±%
Labor	Kevin Hooper	10,693	71.6	+6.6
National	Douglas Jackson	4,234	28.4	+12.0
Total formal votes		14,927	96.2	−1.5
Informal votes		597	3.8	+1.5
Turnout		15,524	91.2	+4.4
Labor hold		Swing	+0.5	

==== By-election ====
- This by-election was caused by the death of Kevin Hooper. It was held on 9 March 1984.

1984 Archerfield state by-election
Party	Candidate	Votes	%	±%
Labor	Henry Palaszczuk	8,641	61.51	–10.12
Liberal	John Shea	2,173	15.47	+15.47
National	Doug Jackson	1,796	12.78	–15.59
Democrats	David Adams	748	5.32	+5.32
Independent	Bruce Parmenter	456	3.25	+3.25
Independent	Mervyn Clarkson	93	0.66	+0.66
Independent	Norman Eather	31	0.22	+0.22
Total formal votes		14,049	96.54	+0.39
Informal votes		503	3.46	–0.39
Turnout		14,552	82.39	–8.80
Labor hold		Swing	N/A	

=== Ashgrove ===
1983 Queensland state election: Ashgrove
Party	Candidate	Votes	%	±%
Labor	Tom Veivers	7,414	42.4	+1.9
National	Clive Appleby	4,963	28.4	+28.4
Liberal	John Greenwood	3,425	19.6	−24.1
Democrats	Michael West	1,676	9.6	−2.9
Total formal votes		17,478	99.0	+0.3
Informal votes		172	1.0	−0.3
Turnout		17,650	92.3	+2.6
Two-party-preferred result
Labor	Tom Veivers	9,019	51.6	+2.0
National	Clive Appleby	8,459	48.4	+48.4
Labor gain from Liberal		Swing	+2.0	

=== Aspley ===
1983 Queensland state election: Aspley
Party	Candidate	Votes	%	±%
National	Brian Cahill	6,766	37.1	+5.4
Labor	Daniel O'Connell	6,224	34.1	+6.1
Liberal	Beryce Nelson	5,269	28.9	−2.1
Total formal votes		18,259	98.9	+0.4
Informal votes		205	1.1	+0.4
Turnout		18,464	93.6	+3.2
Two-party-preferred result
National	Brian Cahill	11,033	60.4	+24.4
Labor	Daniel O'Connell	7,226	39.6	+39.6
National gain from Liberal		Swing	+24.4	

=== Auburn ===
1983 Queensland state election: Auburn
Party	Candidate	Votes	%	±%
National	Neville Harper	7,116	73.3	+6.0
Labor	Raymond Barker	2,590	26.7	−3.2
Total formal votes		9,706	99.2	−0.2
Informal votes		82	0.8	+0.2
Turnout		9,788	93.9	+1.9
National hold		Swing	+4.2	

=== Balonne ===
1983 Queensland state election: Balonne
Party	Candidate	Votes	%	±%
National	Don Neal	5,736	74.4	+5.7
Labor	Graham Staerk	1,975	25.6	−5.7
Total formal votes		7,711	98.8	+0.3
Informal votes		94	1.2	−0.3
Turnout		7,805	91.4	+2.7
National hold		Swing	+5.7	

=== Barambah ===
1983 Queensland state election: Barambah
Party	Candidate	Votes	%	±%
National	Joh Bjelke-Petersen	8,446	78.5	−1.9
Labor	Fred Hoberg	2,310	21.5	+4.7
Total formal votes		10,756	98.9	−0.1
Informal votes		123	1.1	+0.1
Turnout		10,879	93.7	+1.8
National hold		Swing	−3.3	

=== Barron River ===
1983 Queensland state election: Barron River
Party	Candidate	Votes	%	±%
National	Martin Tenni	10,966	53.2	+10.5
Labor	Wendy Lilja	9,642	46.8	+1.6
Total formal votes		20,608	98.2	−0.7
Informal votes		370	1.8	+0.7
Turnout		20,978	89.4	+3.3
National hold		Swing	+2.4	

=== Brisbane Central ===
1983 Queensland state election: Brisbane Central
Party	Candidate	Votes	%	±%
Labor	Brian Davis	8,164	58.9	+5.3
Liberal	Rodney Daniel	5,700	41.1	−0.2
Total formal votes		13,864	96.9	−0.3
Informal votes		447	3.1	+0.3
Turnout		14,311	88.7	+4.4
Labor hold		Swing	+1.2	

=== Bulimba ===
1983 Queensland state election: Bulimba
Party	Candidate	Votes	%	±%
Labor	Ron McLean	8,073	56.9	+2.3
National	Peter Stone	4,106	28.9	+28.9
Liberal	Isabel Daniel	2,020	14.2	−31.2
Total formal votes		14,199	98.4	+0.6
Informal votes		234	1.6	−0.6
Turnout		14,433	91.8	+2.9
Two-party-preferred result
Labor	Ron McLean	8,524	60.0	+5.4
National	Peter Stone	5,675	40.0	+40.0
Labor hold		Swing	+5.4	

=== Bundaberg ===
1983 Queensland state election: Bundaberg
Party	Candidate	Votes	%	±%
Labor	Clem Campbell	7,676	52.0	−2.3
National	Des Barritt	6,122	41.5	+6.3
Democrats	Alex Warren	956	6.5	+1.5
Total formal votes		14,754	99.1	−0.1
Informal votes		138	0.9	+0.1
Turnout		14,892	93.7	+2.2
Two-party-preferred result
Labor	Clem Campbell	8,154	55.3	−3.0
National	Des Barritt	6,600	44.7	+3.0
Labor hold		Swing	−3.0	

=== Burdekin ===
1983 Queensland state election: Burdekin
Party	Candidate	Votes	%	±%
National	Mark Stoneman	5,376	47.4	−7.1
Labor	Peter Rehbein	4,532	39.9	−5.6
Liberal	Ian Macdonald	1,335	11.8	+11.8
Independent	Keven Proberts	108	1.0	+1.0
Total formal votes		11,351	98.9	0.0
Informal votes		129	1.1	0.0
Turnout		11,480	94.4	+2.9
Two-party-preferred result
National	Mark Stoneman	6,437	56.7	+2.2
Labor	Peter Rehbein	4,914	43.3	−2.2
National hold		Swing	+2.2	

=== Burnett ===
1983 Queensland state election: Burnett
Party	Candidate	Votes	%	±%
National	Claude Wharton	8,709	66.1	−3.7
Labor	Graham Betts	4,461	33.9	+3.7
Total formal votes		13,170	99.1	+0.1
Informal votes		124	0.9	−0.1
Turnout		13,294	93.3	+1.7
National hold		Swing	−3.7	

=== Caboolture ===
1983 Queensland state election: Caboolture
Party	Candidate	Votes	%	±%
Labor	Robert Wilson	11,320	44.2	+3.8
National	Bill Newton	11,222	43.8	+1.6
Liberal	Graeme Selby	2,459	9.6	−5.6
Independent	John Bergin	636	2.5	+2.5
Total formal votes		25,637	98.6	+0.5
Informal votes		360	1.4	−0.5
Turnout		25,997	92.7	+3.2
Two-party-preferred result
National	Bill Newton	13,667	53.3	−2.0
Labor	Robert Wilson	11,970	46.7	+2.0
National hold		Swing	−2.0	

=== Cairns ===
1983 Queensland state election: Cairns
Party	Candidate	Votes	%	±%
Labor	Keith De Lacy	9,253	50.6	−8.1
National	Christian Bolton	7,686	42.0	+17.7
Liberal	Lionel Van Dorssen	1,359	7.4	−7.2
Total formal votes		18,298	97.9	−0.4
Informal votes		389	2.1	+0.4
Turnout		18,687	89.2	+3.4
Two-party-preferred result
Labor	Keith De Lacy	9,557	52.2	−11.7
National	Christian Bolton	8,741	47.8	+11.7
Labor hold		Swing	−11.7	

=== Callide ===
1983 Queensland state election: Callide
Party	Candidate	Votes	%	±%
National	Alan Stevenson	5,817	39.3	−26.5
Independent	Lindsay Hartwig	5,249	35.4	+35.4
Labor	Alan Morris	3,746	25.3	−8.9
Total formal votes		14,812	99.1	+0.7
Informal votes		135	0.9	−0.7
Turnout		14,947	92.6	+1.5
Two-candidate-preferred result
Independent	Lindsay Hartwig	8,785	59.3	+59.3
National	Alan Stevenson	6,027	40.7	−25.1
Independent gain from National		Swing	N/A	

=== Carnarvon ===
1983 Queensland state election: Carnarvon
Party	Candidate	Votes	%	±%
National	Peter McKechnie	6,363	64.3	+2.5
Labor	Deanna Selle	3,537	35.7	−2.5
Total formal votes		9,900	98.4	−0.3
Informal votes		163	1.6	+0.3
Turnout		10,063	92.6	+1.3
National hold		Swing	+2.5	

=== Chatsworth ===
1983 Queensland state election: Chatsworth
Party	Candidate	Votes	%	±%
Labor	Terry Mackenroth	9,929	57.6	−0.6
Liberal	David Cahalan	7,314	42.4	+0.6
Total formal votes		17,243	98.3	0.0
Informal votes		305	1.7	0.0
Turnout		17,548	92.6	+1.8
Labor hold		Swing	−0.6	

=== Condamine ===
1983 Queensland state election: Condamine
Party	Candidate	Votes	%	±%
National	Brian Littleproud	8,272	67.8	−0.1
Labor	Barry Hicks	2,473	20.3	−4.2
Independent	Margaret Wuth	1,447	11.9	+11.9
Total formal votes		12,192	99.4	+0.1
Informal votes		78	0.6	−0.1
Turnout		12,270	94.0	+1.6
Two-party-preferred result
National	Brian Littleproud	8,996	73.8	+1.0
Labor	Barry Hicks	3,148	27.2	−1.0
National hold		Swing	+1.0	

=== Cook ===
1983 Queensland state election: Cook
Party	Candidate	Votes	%	±%
Labor	Bob Scott	5,373	63.5	+3.7
National	Patrick Killoran	1,779	21.0	−9.8
National	James Wilkinson	1,309	15.5	+15.5
Total formal votes		8,461	98.0	+0.1
Informal votes		171	2.0	−0.1
Turnout		8,632	84.0	+2.7
Two-party-preferred result
Labor	Bob Scott	5,373	63.5	+1.1
National	Patrick Killoran	3,088	36.5	−1.1
Labor hold		Swing	+1.1	

=== Cooroora ===
1983 Queensland state election: Cooroora
Party	Candidate	Votes	%	±%
National	Gordon Simpson	13,478	57.5	+3.4
Labor	Gordon Nuttall	7,805	33.3	+6.2
Democrats	T. Roth	1,655	7.1	+7.1
Independent	Stanley Carlile	482	2.1	+2.1
Total formal votes		23,420	98.6	0.0
Informal votes		339	1.4	0.0
Turnout		23,759	90.7	+1.8
Two-party-preferred result
National	Gordon Simpson	14,547	62.1	−4.3
Labor	Gordon Nuttall	8,873	37.9	+4.3
National hold		Swing	−4.3	

=== Cunningham ===
1983 Queensland state election: Cunningham
Party	Candidate	Votes	%	±%
National	Tony Elliott	10,876	78.7	+8.0
Labor	Warren Keats	2,935	21.3	+5.3
Total formal votes		13,811	98.7	−0.7
Informal votes		183	1.3	+0.7
Turnout		13,994	93.8	+2.4
National hold		Swing	−1.6	

=== Everton ===
1983 Queensland state election: Everton
Party	Candidate	Votes	%	±%
Labor	Glen Milliner	8,412	52.9	+7.5
National	Donald Munro	4,916	30.9	+10.1
Liberal	Gregory Smith	2,588	16.3	−11.3
Total formal votes		15,916	99.1	+0.2
Informal votes		137	0.9	−0.2
Turnout		16,053	94.1	+3.1
Two-party-preferred result
Labor	Glen Milliner	8,990	56.5	+5.8
National	Donald Munro	6,926	43.5	−5.8
Labor hold		Swing	+5.8	

=== Fassifern ===
1983 Queensland state election: Fassifern
Party	Candidate	Votes	%	±%
National	Kev Lingard	13,306	46.0	+4.3
Labor	Brian Milner	11,780	40.7	+6.2
Liberal	Noel Clarke	3,827	13.2	−10.6
Total formal votes		28,913	98.6	−0.1
Informal votes		398	1.4	+0.1
Turnout		29,311	91.5	+2.2
Two-party-preferred result
National	Kev Lingard	16,329	56.5	−2.8
Labor	Brian Milner	12,584	43.5	+2.8
National hold		Swing	−2.8	

=== Flinders ===
1983 Queensland state election: Flinders
Party	Candidate	Votes	%	±%
National	Bob Katter	5,124	51.8	−4.2
Labor	Beverley Lauder	4,090	41.4	−2.6
Independent	Peter Black	671	6.8	+6.8
Total formal votes		9,885	98.9	+0.1
Informal votes		109	1.1	−0.1
Turnout		9,994	90.0	+3.8
Two-party-preferred result
National	Bob Katter	5,460	55.2	−0.8
Labor	Beverley Lauder	4,425	44.8	+0.8
National hold		Swing	−0.8	

=== Greenslopes ===
1983 Queensland state election: Greenslopes
Party	Candidate	Votes	%	±%
Labor	Robert Lauchland	5,715	40.8	+3.1
National	Leisha Harvey	4,358	31.1	+31.1
Liberal	Bill Hewitt	3,939	28.1	−34.2
Total formal votes		14,012	98.6	+0.8
Informal votes		199	1.4	−0.8
Turnout		14,211	92.1	+3.1
Two-party-preferred result
National	Leisha Harvey	7,610	54.3	+54.3
Labor	Robert Lauchland	6,402	45.7	+8.0
National gain from Liberal		Swing	N/A	

=== Gregory ===
1983 Queensland state election: Gregory
Party	Candidate	Votes	%	±%
National	Bill Glasson	4,690	62.8	+3.6
Labor	Robert McPhee	2,772	37.2	−3.6
Total formal votes		7,462	99.1	+0.3
Informal votes		70	0.9	−0.3
Turnout		7,532	90.7	+3.2
National hold		Swing	+3.6	

=== Gympie ===
1983 Queensland state election: Gympie
Party	Candidate	Votes	%	±%
National	Len Stephan	8,964	64.5	+10.8
Labor	Thomas Barnett	4,940	35.5	+9.6
Total formal votes		13,904	98.9	−0.2
Informal votes		159	1.1	+0.2
Turnout		14,063	93.5	−1.3
National hold		Swing	−3.8	

=== Hinchinbrook ===
1983 Queensland state election: Hinchinbrook
Party	Candidate	Votes	%	±%
National	Ted Row	5,718	47.1	−2.5
Labor	Steve Bredhauer	4,964	40.9	+8.2
Liberal	William Mason	1,458	12.0	+12.0
Total formal votes		12,140	98.6	+1.5
Informal votes		169	1.4	−1.5
Turnout		12,309	93.1	+2.9
Two-party-preferred result
National	Ted Row	6,828	56.2	−3.0
Labor	Steve Bredhauer	5,312	43.8	+3.0
National hold		Swing	−3.0	

=== Ipswich ===
1983 Queensland state election: Ipswich
Party	Candidate	Votes	%	±%
Labor	David Hamill	8,941	54.5	+13.1
National	William Hayes	3,830	23.3	+23.3
Liberal	Graham Cruickshank	3,500	21.3	−32.2
Independent	Victor Robb	146	0.9	+0.9
Total formal votes		16,417	99.0	+0.3
Informal votes		173	1.0	−0.3
Turnout		16,590	93.5	+1.7
Two-party-preferred result
Labor	David Hamill	9,796	59.7	+14.8
National	William Hayes	6,621	40.3	+40.3
Labor gain from Liberal		Swing	+14.8	

=== Ipswich West ===
1983 Queensland state election: Ipswich West
Party	Candidate	Votes	%	±%
Labor	David Underwood	9,564	55.7	+3.4
National	John Roberts	5,191	30.2	+12.9
Liberal	Christopher Tankey	2,106	12.3	−18.1
Independent	Geoffrey Snell	301	1.8	+1.8
Total formal votes		17,162	98.9	0.0
Informal votes		189	1.1	0.0
Turnout		17,351	91.9	+4.1
Two-party-preferred result
Labor	David Underwood	10,185	59.4	+5.3
National	John Roberts	6,977	40.6	+40.6
Labor hold		Swing	+5.3	

=== Isis ===
1983 Queensland state election: Isis
Party	Candidate	Votes	%	±%
National	Lin Powell	10,193	57.1	+7.0
Labor	Joseph Endres	7,665	42.9	+6.7
Total formal votes		17,858	98.7	0.0
Informal votes		239	1.3	0.0
Turnout		18,097	92.5	+2.3
National hold		Swing	−1.6	

=== Ithaca ===
1983 Queensland state election: Ithaca
Party	Candidate	Votes	%	±%
Liberal	Col Miller	7,475	53.3	−6.6
Labor	Ross MacLeod	6,561	46.7	+6.6
Total formal votes		14,036	98.4	+0.4
Informal votes		228	1.6	−0.4
Turnout		14,264	91.0	+3.7
Liberal hold		Swing	−6.6	

=== Kurilpa ===
1983 Queensland state election: Kurilpa
Party	Candidate	Votes	%	±%
Labor	Anne Warner	7,098	49.4	+3.5
Liberal	Sam Doumany	3,607	25.1	−25.1
National	Patricia Kelly	3,198	22.2	+22.2
Progress	Alvan Hawkes	270	1.9	−2.0
Independent	John Nobody	198	1.2	+1.2
Total formal votes		14,371	97.8	−0.2
Informal votes		318	2.2	+0.2
Turnout		14,689	89.3	+2.3
Two-party-preferred result
Labor	Anne Warner	7,469	52.0	+4.7
Liberal	Sam Doumany	6,902	48.0	−4.7
Labor gain from Liberal		Swing	+4.7	

=== Landsborough ===
1983 Queensland state election: Landsborough
Party	Candidate	Votes	%	±%
National	Mike Ahern	15,555	56.6	+2.7
Labor	Peter Byrne	5,101	18.6	−5.7
Labor	Gary Flanigan	3,537	12.9	+12.9
Independent	Ken Neil	1,647	6.0	+6.0
Independent	Donald Culley	1,351	4.9	+4.9
Progress	Dennis Marshall	296	1.1	+1.1
Total formal votes		27,487	98.7	−0.3
Informal votes		372	1.3	+0.3
Turnout		27,859	91.0	+2.3
Two-party-preferred result
National	Mike Ahern	17,576	63.9	−5.6
Labor	Peter Byrne	9,911	36.1	+5.6
National hold		Swing	−5.6	

=== Lockyer ===
1983 Queensland state election: Lockyer
Party	Candidate	Votes	%	±%
National	Tony FitzGerald	11,040	61.6	+33.3
Labor	Sheila Forknall	4,007	22.4	+4.6
Liberal	Tony Bourke	2,878	16.1	−17.2
Total formal votes		17,925	99.1	+0.5
Informal votes		164	0.9	−0.5
Turnout		18,089	92.7	+1.8
Two-party-preferred result
National	Tony FitzGerald	13,275	74.1	+3.3
Labor	Sheila Forknall	4,650	25.9	−3.3
National hold		Swing	+3.3	

=== Lytton ===
1983 Queensland state election: Lytton
Party	Candidate	Votes	%	±%
Labor	Tom Burns	10,670	71.4	−2.2
Liberal	Moyra Bidstrup	4,276	28.6	+2.2
Total formal votes		14,946	97.6	−0.4
Informal votes		364	2.4	+0.4
Turnout		15,310	92.8	+3.4
Labor hold		Swing	−2.2	

=== Mackay ===
1983 Queensland state election: Mackay
Party	Candidate	Votes	%	±%
Labor	Ed Casey	10,372	56.0	−3.2
National	John Comerford	8,163	44.0	+12.0
Total formal votes		18,535	98.4	−0.5
Informal votes		295	1.6	+0.5
Turnout		18,830	90.8	+2.5
Labor hold		Swing	−5.6	

=== Mansfield ===
1983 Queensland state election: Mansfield
Party	Candidate	Votes	%	±%
National	Bill Kaus	7,615	40.0	+40.0
Labor	Norma Jones	7,402	38.9	−1.1
Liberal	Gregory Goebel	3,827	20.1	−34.8
Progress	Desmond McKay	175	0.9	−4.2
Total formal votes		19,019	98.8	+0.3
Informal votes		226	1.2	−0.3
Turnout		19,245	93.2	+2.7
Two-party-preferred result
National	Bill Kaus	10,677	56.1	+56.1
Labor	Norma Jones	8,342	43.9	+2.2
National gain from Liberal		Swing	N/A	

=== Maryborough ===
1983 Queensland state election: Maryborough
Party	Candidate	Votes	%	±%
Labor	Peter Nightingale	7,342	48.0	+0.3
National	Gilbert Alison	6,769	44.3	+44.3
Liberal	Rodney Bailey	1,177	7.7	−39.5
Total formal votes		15,288	99.2	0.0
Informal votes		118	0.8	0.0
Turnout		15,406	94.8	+2.5
Two-party-preferred result
National	Gilbert Alison	7,648	50.03	+50.03
Labor	Peter Nightingale	7,640	49.97	−0.60
National gain from Labor		Swing	+50.03	

=== Merthyr ===
1983 Queensland state election: Merthyr
Party	Candidate	Votes	%	±%
Labor	Leon Pearce	5,520	40.6	−4.9
Liberal	Don Lane	4,416	32.5	−22.0
National	William Owen	3,480	25.6	+25.6
Independent	Gary Waddell	183	1.4	+1.4
Total formal votes		13,599	97.9	+0.8
Informal votes		288	2.1	−0.8
Turnout		13,887	89.8	+5.8
Two-party-preferred result
Liberal	Don Lane	7,853	57.7	+3.2
Labor	Leon Pearce	5,746	42.3	−3.2
Liberal hold		Swing	+3.2	

=== Mirani ===
1983 Queensland state election: Mirani
Party	Candidate	Votes	%	±%
National	Jim Randell	8,251	56.6	+19.4
Labor	Jeffrey Gascoyne	6,338	43.4	+5.0
Total formal votes		14,589	98.8	−0.5
Informal votes		176	1.2	+0.5
Turnout		14,765	92.7	+1.5
National hold		Swing	+3.6	

=== Mount Coot-tha ===
1983 Queensland state election: Mount Coot-tha
Party	Candidate	Votes	%	±%
National	Cedric Dowdle	5,805	32.8	+32.8
Liberal	Bill Lickiss	4,751	26.9	−35.9
Labor	Denis Pacey	4,086	23.1	+6.6
Democrats	David Dalgarno	3,029	17.1	−3.7
Total formal votes		17,671	99.3	+0.5
Informal votes		129	0.7	−0.5
Turnout		17,800	92.8	+3.7
Two-candidate-preferred result
Liberal	Bill Lickiss	10,700	60.5	−12.4
National	Cedric Dowdle	6,971	39.5	+39.5
Liberal hold		Swing	N/A	

=== Mount Gravatt ===
1983 Queensland state election: Mount Gravatt
Party	Candidate	Votes	%	±%
Labor	Steve Tharendu	6,201	35.8	+4.8
National	Ian Henderson	5,909	34.1	+8.9
Liberal	Guelfi Scassola	5,209	30.1	−13.7
Total formal votes		17,319	98.6	−0.2
Informal votes		242	1.4	+0.2
Turnout		17,561	93.1	+3.5
Two-party-preferred result
National	Ian Henderson	10,037	57.9	+57.9
Labor	Steve Tharendu	7,282	42.1	+7.8
National gain from Liberal		Swing	N/A	

=== Mount Isa ===
1983 Queensland state election: Mount Isa
Party	Candidate	Votes	%	±%
Labor	Bill Price	6,611	51.5	+7.1
National	Angelo Bertoni	5,883	45.8	+3.0
Independent	Desmond Welk	337	2.6	+2.6
Total formal votes		12,831	97.5	+0.2
Informal votes		329	2.5	−0.2
Turnout		13,160	86.1	+2.1
Two-party-preferred result
Labor	Bill Price	6,780	52.8	+3.7
National	Angelo Bertoni	6,051	47.2	−3.7
Labor gain from National		Swing	+3.7	

=== Mourilyan ===
1983 Queensland state election: Mourilyan
Party	Candidate	Votes	%	±%
Labor	Bill Eaton	5,510	52.1	+0.8
National	Vicky Kippin	4,941	46.7	−2.0
Independent	Ronald Nielsen	135	1.3	+1.3
Total formal votes		10,586	99.0	+0.2
Informal votes		104	1.0	−0.2
Turnout		10,690	93.3	+3.0
Two-party-preferred result
Labor	Bill Eaton	5,578	52.7	+1.4
National	Vicky Kippin	5,008	47.3	−1.4
Labor hold		Swing	+1.4	

=== Mulgrave ===
1983 Queensland state election: Mulgrave
Party	Candidate	Votes	%	±%
National	Max Menzel	6,769	56.1	+11.5
Labor	George Pervan	4,970	41.2	+3.1
Independent	Leslie Webber	320	2.7	+2.7
Total formal votes		12,059	98.9	−0.2
Informal votes		132	1.1	+0.2
Turnout		12,191	91.9	+1.1
Two-party-preferred result
National	Max Menzel	6,929	57.5	+1.0
Labor	George Pervan	5,130	42.5	−1.0
National hold		Swing	+1.0	

=== Murrumba ===
1983 Queensland state election: Murrumba
Party	Candidate	Votes	%	±%
Labor	Joe Kruger	10,169	50.9	+0.8
National	Allan Male	6,008	30.1	−0.5
Liberal	Roger Maguire	3,795	19.0	−0.2
Total formal votes		19,972	98.7	−0.1
Informal votes		266	1.3	+0.1
Turnout		20,238	93.1	+2.9
Two-party-preferred result
Labor	Joe Kruger	11,017	55.2	−0.2
National	Allan Male	8,955	44.8	+0.2
Labor hold		Swing	−0.2	

=== Nudgee ===
1983 Queensland state election: Nudgee
Party	Candidate	Votes	%	±%
Labor	Ken Vaughan	8,973	62.4	+1.5
Liberal	Peter Hull	5,398	37.6	−1.5
Total formal votes		14,371	97.7	−0.8
Informal votes		331	2.3	+0.8
Turnout		14,702	93.4	+2.7
Labor hold		Swing	+1.5	

=== Nundah ===
1983 Queensland state election: Nundah
Party	Candidate	Votes	%	±%
Liberal	William Knox	7,999	56.2	−3.4
Labor	Owen Gazzard	6,237	43.8	+3.4
Total formal votes		14,236	98.2	−0.1
Informal votes		262	1.8	+0.1
Turnout		14,498	90.7	+2.6
Liberal hold		Swing	−3.4	

=== Peak Downs ===
1983 Queensland state election: Peak Downs
Party	Candidate	Votes	%	±%
National	Vince Lester	7,533	59.7	−1.6
Labor	Lindsay Shepherd	4,912	38.9	+2.4
Independent	Bruce Bragg	168	1.3	+1.3
Total formal votes		12,613	99.4	+0.1
Informal votes		72	0.6	−0.1
Turnout		12,685	91.2	+2.3
Two-party-preferred result
National	Vince Lester	7,617	60.4	−1.7
Labor	Lindsay Shepherd	4,996	39.6	+1.7
National hold		Swing	−1.7	

=== Pine Rivers ===
1983 Queensland state election: Pine Rivers
Party	Candidate	Votes	%	±%
Labor	John Kennedy	9,842	44.4	+1.9
National	Yvonne Chapman	6,773	30.5	+30.5
Liberal	Rob Akers	5,566	25.1	−32.4
Total formal votes		22,181	98.8	+0.8
Informal votes		263	1.2	−0.8
Turnout		22,444	94.1	+2.6
Two-party-preferred result
National	Yvonne Chapman	11,173	50.4	+50.4
Labor	John Kennedy	11,008	49.6	+7.1
National gain from Liberal		Swing	N/A	

=== Port Curtis ===
1983 Queensland state election: Port Curtis
Party	Candidate	Votes	%	±%
Labor	Bill Prest	8,127	51.0	−2.8
National	Michael Crowley	6,973	43.7	+11.2
Independent	Patricia Cathcart	676	4.2	+4.2
Christian Alternative	Rata Pugh	168	1.1	+1.1
Total formal votes		15,944	98.7	−0.3
Informal votes		204	1.3	+0.3
Turnout		16,148	91.8	+1.4
Two-party-preferred result
Labor	Bill Prest	8,549	53.6	−4.0
National	Michael Crowley	7,395	46.4	+4.0
Labor hold		Swing	−4.0	

=== Redcliffe ===
1983 Queensland state election: Redcliffe
Party	Candidate	Votes	%	±%
Liberal	Terry White	8,583	55.0	−0.3
Labor	Peter Houston	7,023	45.0	+0.3
Total formal votes		15,606	97.2	−1.2
Informal votes		448	2.8	+1.2
Turnout		16,054	92.6	+0.6
Liberal hold		Swing	−0.3	

=== Redlands ===
1983 Queensland state election: Redlands
Party	Candidate	Votes	%	±%
National	John Goleby	12,194	46.0	+3.6
Labor	Andrew Mellis	10,977	41.4	+0.7
Democrats	Kath Walker	1,700	6.4	+6.4
Liberal	Ken Eastwell	1,643	6.2	−10.7
Total formal votes		26,514	98.6	−0.3
Informal votes		365	1.4	+0.3
Turnout		26,879	92.8	+1.9
Two-party-preferred result
National	John Goleby	14,332	54.0	−0.2
Labor	Andrew Mellis	12,182	46.0	+0.2
National hold		Swing	−0.2	

==== By-election ====
- This by-election was caused by the death of John Goleby. It was held on 2 November 1985.

1985 Redlands state by-election
Party	Candidate	Votes	%	±%
Labor	Con Sciacca	12,650	43.28	+1.88
National	Paul Clauson	10,877	37.21	–8.78
Liberal	Max Bolte	4,169	14.26	+7.85
Democrats	Richard May	991	3.39	–2.81
Independent	Bernard Irving	366	1.25	+1.25
Anti-Hashish Labor Party	Thomas Aeon-Masterson	106	0.36	+0.36
Union Solidarity Party	Jackson Brown	72	0.25	+0.25
Total formal votes		29,231	98.28	–0.36
Informal votes		513	1.72	+0.36
Turnout		29,744	90.75	–2.05
Two-party-preferred result
National	Paul Clauson	14,722	50.36	–3.51
Labor	Con Sciacca	14,508	49.64	+3.51
National hold		Swing	–3.51	

=== Rockhampton ===
1983 Queensland state election: Rockhampton
Party	Candidate	Votes	%	±%
Labor	Keith Wright	8,936	57.2	−7.3
National	Charles Doblo	3,892	24.9	−0.4
Liberal	Alan Agnew	2,660	17.0	+6.8
Independent	Brian Dillon	131	0.8	+0.8
Total formal votes		15,619	99.0	−0.1
Informal votes		157	1.0	+0.1
Turnout		15,776	93.0	+2.7
Two-party-preferred result
Labor	Keith Wright	9,596	61.4	−5.9
National	Charles Doblo	6,023	38.6	+5.9
Labor hold		Swing	−5.9	

==== By-election ====
- This by-election was caused by the resignation of Keith Wright, who entered Federal politics. It was held on 16 February 1985.

1985 Rockhampton state by-election
Party	Candidate	Votes	%	±%
Labor	Paul Braddy	8,409	58.98	+1.77
National	Col Webber	5,849	41.02	–0.92
Total formal votes		14,258	97.87	–1.13
Informal votes		310	2.13	+1.13
Turnout		14,568	87.77	–5.24
Labor hold		Swing	+1.77	

=== Rockhampton North ===
1983 Queensland state election: Rockhampton North
Party	Candidate	Votes	%	±%
Labor	Les Yewdale	11,408	58.7	+0.8
National	Patrick Maloney	6,510	33.5	+4.2
Liberal	Beverley Reynolds	1,521	7.8	−0.2
Total formal votes		19,439	99.1	−0.2
Informal votes		175	0.9	+0.2
Turnout		19,614	94.1	+1.8
Two-party-preferred result
Labor	Les Yewdale	11,748	60.4	−1.8
National	Patrick Maloney	7,691	39.6	+1.8
Labor hold		Swing	−1.8	

=== Roma ===
1983 Queensland state election: Roma
Party	Candidate	Votes	%	±%
National	Russell Cooper	4,267	53.8	−11.6
Labor	August Johanson	2,367	29.9	−4.7
Liberal	Thomas Warren	997	12.6	+12.6
Democrats	Clement O'Connor	294	3.7	+3.7
Total formal votes		7,925	99.4	+0.6
Informal votes		51	0.6	−0.6
Turnout		7,976	91.6	+3.0
Two-party-preferred result
National	Russell Cooper	5,188	65.5	+0.1
Labor	August Johanson	2,737	34.5	−0.1
National hold		Swing	+0.1	

=== Salisbury ===
1983 Queensland state election: Salisbury
Party	Candidate	Votes	%	±%
Labor	Wayne Goss	9,245	46.4	+1.4
National	Gavan Duffy	6,699	33.6	+33.6
Liberal	Rosemary Kyburz	3,970	19.9	−26.4
Total formal votes		19,914	98.4	+0.3
Informal votes		314	1.6	−0.3
Turnout		20,228	92.6	+3.4
Two-party-preferred result
Labor	Wayne Goss	10,183	51.1	+3.4
National	Gavan Duffy	9,731	48.9	+48.9
Labor gain from Liberal		Swing	+3.4	

=== Sandgate ===
1983 Queensland state election: Sandgate
Party	Candidate	Votes	%	±%
Labor	Nev Warburton	9,023	59.9	−0.6
National	Ian Armstrong	4,135	27.5	+27.5
Liberal	Ian Parminter	1,895	12.6	−14.5
Total formal votes		15,053	98.4	0.0
Informal votes		244	1.6	0.0
Turnout		15,297	92.2	+2.8
Two-party-preferred result
Labor	Nev Warburton	9,446	62.8	−1.8
National	Ian Armstrong	5,607	37.2	+37.2
Labor hold		Swing	−1.8	

=== Sherwood ===
1983 Queensland state election: Sherwood
Party	Candidate	Votes	%	±%
Liberal	Angus Innes	7,267	40.1	−14.6
Labor	John Court	5,727	31.6	+5.0
National	Christopher Stephens	4,585	25.3	+8.5
Independent	Cedric Holland	546	3.0	+3.0
Total formal votes		18,125	98.9	0.0
Informal votes		194	1.1	0.0
Turnout		18,319	93.2	+3.5
Two-party-preferred result
Liberal	Angus Innes	12,087	66.7	−4.2
Labor	John Court	6,038	33.3	+4.2
Liberal hold		Swing	−4.2	

=== Somerset ===
1983 Queensland state election: Somerset
Party	Candidate	Votes	%	±%
National	Bill Gunn	12,490	54.3	+4.3
Labor	Ron Hazelden	8,538	37.1	+7.7
Liberal	Clive Herrald	1,976	8.6	−12.0
Total formal votes		23,004	98.6	−0.3
Informal votes		323	1.4	+0.3
Turnout		23,327	92.1	+1.2
Two-party-preferred result
National	Bill Gunn	14,025	61.0	−4.0
Labor	Ron Hazelden	8,979	39.0	+4.0
National hold		Swing	−4.0	

=== South Brisbane ===
1983 Queensland state election: South Brisbane
Party	Candidate	Votes	%	±%
Labor	Jim Fouras	7,476	55.0	+2.7
National	Malcolm Ellis	4,052	29.8	+29.8
Liberal	Rodney Miller	1,914	14.1	−30.2
Socialist	Ivan Ivanoff	155	1.1	+1.1
Total formal votes		13,597	97.3	−0.2
Informal votes		382	2.7	+0.2
Turnout		13,979	87.8	+3.7
Two-party-preferred result
Labor	Jim Fouras	7,982	58.7	+4.7
National	Malcolm Ellis	5,615	41.3	+41.3
Labor hold		Swing	+4.7	

=== South Coast ===
1983 Queensland state election: South Coast
Party	Candidate	Votes	%	±%
National	Russ Hinze	11,325	48.6	+4.5
Labor	Noel Elliott	8,971	38.5	+16.7
Liberal	Ian Foyster	3,021	13.0	−10.7
Total formal votes		23,317	98.7	+0.4
Informal votes		314	1.3	−0.4
Turnout		23,631	87.1	+2.4
Two-party-preferred result
National	Russ Hinze	13,405	57.5	−7.1
Labor	Noel Elliott	9,912	42.5	+7.1
National hold		Swing	−7.1	

=== Southport ===
1983 Queensland state election: Southport
Party	Candidate	Votes	%	±%
National	Doug Jennings	10,406	52.1	+18.4
Labor	Ian Rogers	6,543	32.8	+7.4
Liberal	Carol McLaughlin	3,024	15.1	−23.4
Total formal votes		19,973	98.1	+0.8
Informal votes		380	1.9	−0.8
Turnout		20,353	89.5	+4.0
Two-party-preferred result
National	Doug Jennings	12,755	63.9	+0.6
Labor	Ian Rogers	7,218	36.1	−0.6
National hold		Swing	+0.6	

=== Stafford ===
1983 Queensland state election: Stafford
Party	Candidate	Votes	%	±%
Labor	Denis Murphy	7,301	46.4	−2.9
National	Patrick Blake	4,525	28.7	+28.7
Liberal	Terry Gygar	3,923	24.9	−25.8
Total formal votes		15,749	98.7	+0.7
Informal votes		311	2.0	−0.7
Turnout		15,960	92.8	+2.3
Two-party-preferred result
Labor	Denis Murphy	7,894	50.1	+0.8
National	Patrick Blake	7,855	49.9	+49.9
Labor gain from Liberal		Swing	+0.8	

==== By-election ====
- This by-election was caused by the death of Denis Murphy. It was held on 4 August 1984.

1984 Stafford state by-election
Party	Candidate	Votes	%	±%
Labor	Janine Walker	6,764	45.17	−1.18
Liberal	Terry Gygar	4,215	27.55	+2.63
National	Pat Blake	4,048	27.28	−1.45
Total formal votes		14,973	98.64	−0.04
Informal votes		206	1.36	+0.04
Turnout		15,179	88.12	−4.63
Two-party-preferred result
Liberal	Terry Gygar	8,063	53.85	+53.85
Labor	Janine Walker	6,910	46.15	−3.97
Liberal gain from Labor		Swing	N/A	

=== Surfers Paradise ===
1983 Queensland state election: Surfers Paradise
Party	Candidate	Votes	%	±%
National	Rob Borbidge	11,994	56.9	+15.0
Labor	Khalil Salem	6,219	29.5	+8.6
Liberal	Theodore Greenland	2,847	13.5	−19.3
Total formal votes		21,060	98.3	0.0
Informal votes		356	1.7	0.0
Turnout		21,416	87.8	+3.1
Two-party-preferred result
National	Rob Borbidge	14,205	67.4	−1.3
Labor	Khalil Salem	6,855	32.6	+1.3
National hold		Swing	−1.3	

=== Toowong ===
1983 Queensland state election: Toowong
Party	Candidate	Votes	%	±%
Labor	Nigel Pennington	5,431	35.7	+8.3
National	Earle Bailey	5,284	34.7	+9.1
Liberal	Ian Prentice	4,489	29.5	−4.7
Total formal votes		15,204	99.0	+0.1
Informal votes		153	1.0	−0.1
Turnout		15,357	90.2	+4.8
Two-party-preferred result
National	Earle Bailey	8,392	55.2	+55.2
Labor	Nigel Pennington	6,812	44.8	+8.6
National gain from Liberal		Swing	N/A	

=== Toowoomba North ===
1983 Queensland state election: Toowoomba North
Party	Candidate	Votes	%	±%
Labor	Peter Wood	7,006	42.6	−1.9
National	Sandy McPhie	6,002	36.5	+36.5
Liberal	John Lockwood	3,444	20.9	−34.6
Total formal votes		16,452	98.9	+0.7
Informal votes		181	1.1	−0.7
Turnout		16,633	93.3	+3.5
Two-party-preferred result
National	Sandy McPhie	8,818	53.6	+53.6
Labor	Peter Wood	7,634	46.4	+1.9
National gain from Liberal		Swing	N/A	

=== Toowoomba South ===
1983 Queensland state election: Toowoomba South
Party	Candidate	Votes	%	±%
National	John Warner	8,964	52.0	+7.0
Labor	Kim McCasker	6,500	37.7	+4.5
Liberal	Neil O'Sullivan	1,782	10.3	+7.8
Total formal votes		17,256	99.1	+0.5
Informal votes		139	0.9	−0.5
Turnout		17,395	92.8	+3.1
Two-party-preferred result
National	John Warner	10,348	60.0	−0.1
Labor	Kim McCasker	6,898	40.0	+0.1
National hold		Swing	−0.1	

=== Townsville ===
1983 Queensland state election: Townsville
Party	Candidate	Votes	%	±%
Labor	Ken McElligott	10,748	47.5	+5.2
National	Peter Arnold	6,508	28.7	+10.2
Liberal	Norman Scott-Young	4,012	17.7	−21.4
Independent	Daniel Gleeson	1,385	6.1	+6.1
Total formal votes		22,653	99.1	+0.6
Informal votes		214	0.9	−0.6
Turnout		22,867	89.6	+5.3
Two-party-preferred result
Labor	Ken McElligott	11,664	51.5	+7.5
National	Peter Arnold	10,989	48.5	+48.5
Labor gain from Liberal		Swing	+7.5	

=== Townsville South ===
1983 Queensland state election: Townsville South
Party	Candidate	Votes	%	±%
Labor	Alex Wilson	7,683	55.5	+6.6
National	Dickway Goon-Chew	5,205	37.6	+12.1
Liberal	Theo Theofanes	967	7.0	−12.3
Total formal votes		13,855	98.8	+0.2
Informal votes		164	1.2	−0.2
Turnout		14,019	90.5	+4.2
Two-party-preferred result
Labor	Alex Wilson	7,899	57.0	−0.6
National	Dickway Goon-Chew	5,956	43.0	+0.6
Labor hold		Swing	−0.6	

=== Townsville West ===
1983 Queensland state election: Townsville West
Party	Candidate	Votes	%	±%
Labor	Geoff Smith	7,605	51.2	−1.3
National	Clifford Donohue	4,700	31.6	−13.5
Liberal	Leslie Tyrell	1,845	12.4	+12.4
Independent	Ron Aitken	709	4.8	+4.8
Total formal votes		14,859	98.7	+0.5
Informal votes		195	1.3	−0.5
Turnout		15,054	88.5	+1.6
Two-party-preferred result
Labor	Geoff Smith	8,372	56.3	+1.9
National	Clifford Donohue	6,487	43.7	−1.9
Labor hold		Swing	+1.9	

=== Warrego ===
1983 Queensland state election: Warrego
Party	Candidate	Votes	%	±%
National	Neil Turner	4,364	57.7	+5.1
Labor	David Land	3,205	42.3	−5.1
Total formal votes		7,569	99.1	+0.5
Informal votes		69	0.9	−0.5
Turnout		7,638	92.4	+3.5
National hold		Swing	+5.1	

=== Warwick ===
1983 Queensland state election: Warwick
Party	Candidate	Votes	%	±%
National	Des Booth	6,921	67.9	+3.5
Labor	Mary Hill	3,278	32.1	+3.1
Total formal votes		10,199	98.3	−0.7
Informal votes		172	1.7	+0.7
Turnout		10,371	93.8	+2.1
National hold		Swing	+0.2	

=== Wavell ===
1983 Queensland state election: Wavell
Party	Candidate	Votes	%	±%
Liberal	Brian Austin	7,208	51.3	−5.6
Labor	Christopher Begley	6,848	48.7	+5.6
Total formal votes		14,056	98.3	+0.2
Informal votes		239	1.7	−0.2
Turnout		14,295	92.6	+3.8
Liberal hold		Swing	−5.6	

=== Whitsunday ===
1983 Queensland state election: Whitsunday
Party	Candidate	Votes	%	±%
National	Geoff Muntz	9,163	56.5	+3.0
Labor	Kevin Poschelk	7,063	43.5	−3.0
Total formal votes		16,226	98.8	+0.1
Informal votes		194	1.2	−0.1
Turnout		16,420	90.4	+0.7
National hold		Swing	+3.0	

=== Windsor ===
1983 Queensland state election: Windsor
Party	Candidate	Votes	%	±%
Labor	Pat Comben	6,868	47.4	+2.4
National	Bob Moore	4,696	32.4	+32.4
Liberal	Ann Garms	2,915	20.1	−27.1
Total formal votes		14,479	98.7	+0.2
Informal votes		195	1.3	−0.2
Turnout		14,674	92.7	+3.5
Two-party-preferred result
Labor	Pat Comben	7,549	52.1	+3.4
National	Bob Moore	6,930	47.9	+47.9
Labor gain from Liberal		Swing	+3.4	

=== Wolston ===
1983 Queensland state election: Wolston
Party	Candidate	Votes	%	±%
Labor	Bob Gibbs	10,251	64.3	+4.9
Liberal	Bob Harper	5,687	35.7	+11.9
Total formal votes		15,938	96.5	−1.4
Informal votes		572	3.5	+1.4
Turnout		16,510	91.0	+3.2
Labor hold		Swing	+3.1	

=== Woodridge ===
1983 Queensland state election: Woodridge
Party	Candidate	Votes	%	±%
Labor	Bill D'Arcy	11,131	48.9	+2.6
National	Selma Elson	7,648	33.6	+33.6
Liberal	Derek Richards	2,133	9.4	−25.6
Democrats	Michael van de Velde	1,616	7.1	−0.5
Socialist	Ray Ferguson	132	0.6	+0.6
Socialist Labour	Katherine Gillick	121	0.5	+0.5
Total formal votes		22,781	98.5	+0.6
Informal votes		354	1.5	−0.6
Turnout		23,135	91.2	+4.6
Two-party-preferred result
Labor	Bill D'Arcy	12,556	55.1	−1.3
National	Selma Elson	10,225	44.9	+1.3
Labor hold		Swing	−1.3	

=== Wynnum ===
1983 Queensland state election: Wynnum
Party	Candidate	Votes	%	±%
Labor	Eric Shaw	9,267	55.7	+3.3
National	Michael Podagiel	5,469	32.9	+3.3
Liberal	Audrey Dickie	1,888	11.4	−6.6
Total formal votes		16,624	98.3	−0.5
Informal votes		281	1.7	+0.5
Turnout		16,905	93.0	+3.0
Two-party-preferred result
Labor	Eric Shaw	9,689	58.3	+1.0
National	Michael Podagiel	6,935	41.7	−1.0
Labor hold		Swing	+1.0	

=== Yeronga ===
1983 Queensland state election: Yeronga
Party	Candidate	Votes	%	±%
Liberal	Norm Lee	7,788	52.9	−4.1
Labor	Kitchener Farrell	6,932	47.1	+4.1
Total formal votes		14,720	97.7	−0.3
Informal votes		343	2.3	+0.3
Turnout		15,063	92.7	+2.3
Liberal hold		Swing	−4.1	

== See also ==
- 1983 Queensland state election
- Members of the Queensland Legislative Assembly, 1983–1986
