= Henry Douglas (Queensland politician) =

Australian politician

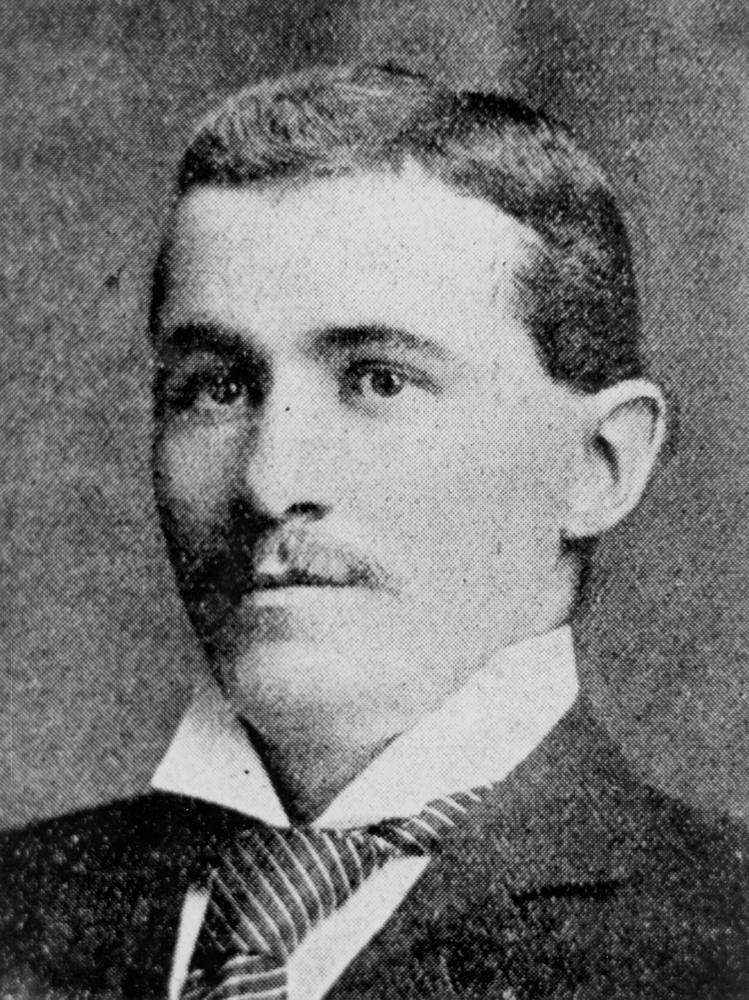

Member of the Queensland Legislative Assembly for Cook
- In office 18 May 1907 – 22 May 1915
- Preceded by: John Hargreaves
- Succeeded by: Henry Ryan

Personal details
- Born: Henry Alexander Cecil Douglas; 8 April 1879 Brisbane, Queensland, Australia
- Died: 30 August 1952 (aged 73) Brisbane
- Resting place: Nudgee Cemetery
- Party: Ministerial
- Other political affiliations: Opposition, Independent
- Spouse(s): Flora Isabel MacDonald (m.1910 d.1910), Catherine Cecilia Beirne (m.1914 d.1977)
- Relations: John Douglas (father), T.C. Beirne (father-in-law), Alex Douglas (grandson)
- Occupation: Businessman

Henry Alexander Cecil Douglas (1879–1952) was an Australian businessman and politician. He was a Member of the Queensland Legislative Assembly.

== Early life ==
Henry Douglas was born on 8 April 1879 in Brisbane, the son of John Douglas (a Premier of Queensland) and his second wife Sarah (née Hickey).

== Politics ==
At the 1907 election Henry Douglas was elected to the Queensland Legislative Assembly representing the electoral district of Cook. He held the seat until the 1915 election when he was defeated by the Labor candidate Harry Ryan.

== Family life ==
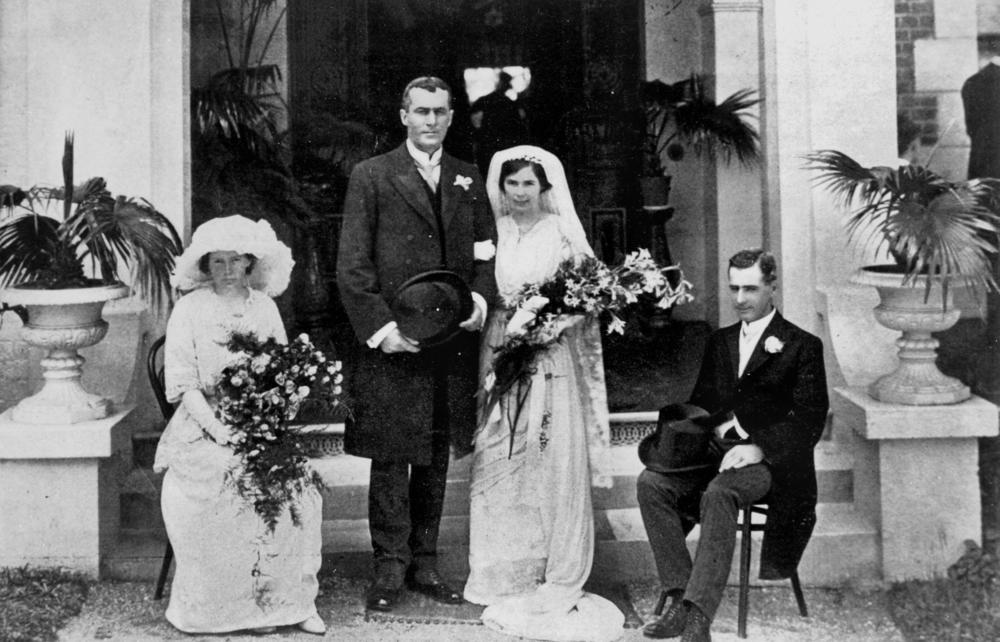
Wedding party of Henry Douglas and Catherine Beirne

On 28 April 1910, Henry Douglas married Flora Isabel MacDonald at the St Stephen's Catholic Cathedral in Brisbane. However, she died unexpectedly six months later on 7 December at their home in Kangaroo Point following a minor illness.

On 11 February 1914, he married Catherine Cecilia Beirne, daughter of Thomas Beirne (a wealthy businessman and Member of the Queensland Legislative Council) at St Stephen's Cathedral in Brisbane; Joseph Shiel ( Bishop of Rockhampton) officiated.

== Later life ==
Henry Douglas died on 30 August 1952 in Brisbane. He was buried on 1 September 1952 at the Nudgee cemetery following a funeral service at St Agatha's Roman Catholic Church at Clayfield.

Parliament of Queensland
Preceded by John Hargreaves	Member for Cook; 1907–1915	Succeeded by Henry Ryan
