= Cynthia Lui =

Australian politician

Cynthia Lui MP

Deputy Speaker of the Queensland Legislative Assembly
- Acting
- In office 23 May – 12 September 2023
- Speaker: Joe Kelly (acting)
- Preceded by: Joe Kelly
- Succeeded by: Joe Kelly

Member of the Queensland Legislative Assembly for Cook
- In office 25 November 2017 – 26 October 2024
- Preceded by: Billy Gordon
- Succeeded by: David Kempton

Personal details
- Born: 17 February 1977 (age 49) Thursday Island, Queensland, Australia
- Party: Labor
- Website: www.cynthialui.com.au

Cynthia Lillian Lui (born 17 February 1977) is an Australian former politician. She was the Australian Labor Party member for Cook in the Queensland Legislative Assembly from 2017 to 2024. Originally from Yam Island in the Torres Strait, Lui is the first Torres Strait Islander to be elected to any parliament. She worked as a community worker in Cairns to win internally as a representative for Cook, she then went on to secure her place within the Labor Party as the preferred candidate. Lui gave her maiden speech in the Queensland Parliament on 15 February 2018.

Parliament of Queensland
Preceded by Billy Gordon	Member for Cook; 2017–2024	Succeeded by David Kempton
