= Jason O'Brien =

Australian politician

Deputy Speaker and Chairman of Committees of the Queensland Legislative Assembly
- In office 21 April 2009 – 14 May 2012
- Preceded by: John English
- Succeeded by: Mark Robinson

Member of the Queensland Legislative Assembly for Cook
- In office 7 February 2004 – 23 March 2012
- Preceded by: Steve Bredhauer
- Succeeded by: David Kempton

Personal details
- Born: Jason Danial O'Brien; 23 November 1969 (age 56) Sydney, New South Wales, Australia
- Party: Labor
- Occupation: Electrician, Research officer

Jason Danial O'Brien (born 23 November 1969) is an Australian politician.

Born in Sydney, he served in the Royal Australian Navy from 1986 to 1990 as an electrician and was a Cairns City Councillor from 2000 from 2004. A member of the Labor Party, he was electorate officer to Steve Bredhauer, member for Cook and Transport Minister in the Beattie government. In 2004, he was elected to the Legislative Assembly of Queensland, succeeding the retiring Bredhauer in the seat of Cook. Following the 2009 election, he was elected Deputy Speaker. He lost his seat at the 2012 election.

O'Brien was a teacher at Smithfield State High School, in Smithfield, Queensland.

Parliament of Queensland
Preceded by Steve Bredhauer	Member for Cook; 1989–2012	Succeeded by David Kempton
