= David Kempton =

Australian politician

Member of the Queensland Legislative Assembly for Cook
- Incumbent
- Assumed office 26 October 2024
- Preceded by: Cynthia Lui
- In office 24 March 2012 – 31 January 2015
- Preceded by: Jason O'Brien
- Succeeded by: Billy Gordon

Personal details
- Born: 1956 (age 69–70)
- Party: Liberal National

David Kempton (born 1956) is an Australian Liberal National politician who has served the member of the Legislative Assembly of Queensland for Cook since 2024, having previously served from 2012 to 2015. He was appointed Assistant Minister for Aboriginal and Torres Strait Islander Affairs on 3 April 2012.

Parliament of Queensland
Preceded by Cynthia Lui	Member for Cook; 2024–present	Succeeded by Incumbent
Preceded by Jason O'Brien	Member for Cook; 2012–2015	Succeeded by Billy Gordon
