= Eric Deeral =

Australian politician

Member of the Queensland Legislative Assembly for Cook
- In office 7 December 1974 – 12 November 1977
- Preceded by: Edwin Wallis-Smith
- Succeeded by: Bob Scott

Personal details
- Born: 23 August 1932 Hopevale, Queensland, Australia
- Died: 5 September 2012 (aged 80) Cooktown Hospital, Cooktown, Queensland, Australia
- Citizenship: Australian
- Party: Country Party
- Education: Woorabinda Central School
- Occupation: Stockman, labourer

Eric Deeral (23 August 1932 – 5 September 2012) was an Australian politician who was the second Australian Aboriginal person elected to an Australian parliament and the first to a state parliament.

A member of the Gamay clan of the Guugu Yimithirr people, Deeral was born at Hope Vale Lutheran Mission in Cape York, Queensland and educated at Woorabinda, to which he was evacuated during World War II. Deeral left school at 13 and worked as a labourer and stockman before becoming Chairman of the Hope Vale Mission Community Council in 1957.

At a meeting of Guugu Yimithirr clans on Palm Island, Queensland in 1964, elders decided to become more politically involved and nominated Deeral to run for parliament.

Joining the Country Party, Deeral worked with the Queensland Department of Aboriginal Affairs and won pre-selection for the Queensland state seat of Cook (which covered Cape York and the Torres Strait Islands) for the 1974 Queensland state election. Normally a safe Labor seat, Deeral won Cook as part of a landslide win to the National (as the Country Party had been renamed) and Liberal Party coalition. Deeral's victory was considered to be due to the proposal of Labor Prime Minister Gough Whitlam's plan to realign Australia's Torres Strait border with Papua New Guinea. Deeral became the second Indigenous Australian to be elected to an Australian parliament, after Neville Bonner's election to the Australian Senate in 1971, and the first to a state or territory parliament.

While in parliament Deeral advocated for improved roads in his electorate to help develop tourism and other industries, as well as securing improvements to locals schools and medical access. In the lead up to the 1977 state election, Deeral's chances of reelection were hurt when the Queensland Government deferred a national eye health program for Aboriginals currently underway in the electorate of Cook due to allegations of members of the program campaigning for the Labor Party. At the election, Deeral lost his seat in a swing away from the Nationals, with the deferral of the eye health program given as a factor in the loss.

Following the election loss, Deeral continued to work with local Aboriginal communities, becoming the inaugural chair of the Aboriginal Coordination Council in 1985 and in 1987 was a delegate to the World Heritage Committee session in Paris, as well as appointed as Chairman of the Legislation Review Committee that examined Queensland legislation and its impact on Aboriginal land rights during the early 1990s.

From 1998 to 2003, Deeral was a member of the Wet Tropics Management Authority Board and in July 2002 was appointed interim chair of the Yalanji Ang-Narra Yimidihirr Peoples Council, as well as taking an active role as a Guugu Yimithirr elder.

In 2012, Queensland's Indigenous Youth Parliament was renamed the Eric Deeral Indigenous Youth Parliament in Deeral's honour. He died later that year.

Parliament of Queensland
Preceded by Edwin Wallis-Smith	Member for Cook; 1974–1977	Succeeded by Bob Scott

== See also ==
- List of Indigenous Australian politicians
