= Shaun Nelson =

Australian politician (born 1973)

Lieutenant Shaun Nelson

Member of the Queensland Legislative Assembly for Tablelands
- In office 13 June 1998 – 17 February 2001
- Preceded by: Tom Gilmore Jr.
- Succeeded by: Rosa Lee Long

Leader of One Nation ACT
- In office June 1997 – December 1997
- Preceded by: Party created
- Succeeded by: Chris Spence

Personal details
- Born: Shaun Christopher Nelson; 22 March 1973 (age 53) Brisbane, Queensland, Australia
- Party: Independent (since 1999)
- Other political affiliations: Liberal (1991–1997); One Nation (1997–1999)
- Occupation: Maritime warfare officer (Royal Australian Navy); Operator Signalman (OpSig) (Australian Army)
- Profession: Soldier politician

Military service
- Allegiance: Commonwealth of Australia
- Branch/service: Royal Australian Navy (RAN) (2001–present); Australian Army (AA) (1991–1998)
- Years of service: 1991–1998; 2001–present
- Rank: Lieutenant (RAN); Private (AA)
- Unit: Maritime Warfare (RAN), 7th Signal Regiment (AA)

Shaun Christopher Nelson (born 22 March 1973) is an Australian politician. He was a member of the Legislative Assembly of Queensland from 1998 to 2001, representing the electorate of Tablelands. He was elected as one of 11 MPs of the One Nation Party at the 1998 state election, before resigning from the party to sit as an independent in February 1999. He served out the remainder of his term before being defeated by One Nation candidate Rosa Lee Long at the 2001 election. He currently serves as a Maritime Warfare Officer in the Royal Australian Navy.

== Early career ==
Nelson was raised in South East, Western and Northern Queensland and joined the military at a young age, serving in the Australian Army as an operational signalman. He initially joined the Liberal Party of Australia, but first became involved in organised politics when, at the age of 24, he was one of the founders of the Australian Capital Territory branch of the One Nation Party. The launch of a branch by the right-wing party in liberal Canberra caused controversy, with Nelson claiming of being denied meeting venues before organising its first meetings amid public protests in July. He was subsequently appointed as the inaugural president of the party's ACT branch. Nelson was behind a move to have the party contest the 1998 territory election that was subsequently vetoed by national party president Pauline Hanson. He later resigned as branch president in December 1997, citing personal reasons, later revealed to be a marriage breakdown.

Nelson returned to Queensland after the collapse of his marriage, and was preselected as the One Nation candidate for the seat of Tablelands for the 1998 election, challenging incumbent Mines and Energy Minister Tom Gilmore. Tablelands was considered a safe seat for the rural conservative National Party, held by a margin of more than twenty percent, and Nelson was not generally considered likely to pose a serious threat to Gilmore. Despite having only had three months to campaign, he polled more than 42% of the vote on election day, defeating Gilmore on preferences and becoming Queensland's youngest member of parliament. He declared his priorities upon his election as being the abolition of mining lease fees, the reintroduction of the death penalty, opposition to Aboriginal native title and resisting the deregulation of the dairy industry.

== One Nation MP ==
Nelson was one of four candidates for the state leadership of One Nation after the election, but lost out to Bill Feldman. He caused some early controversy by calling for the legalisation of prostitution in Queensland, echoing the pro-sex industry position he had taken while president of the ACT branch, in sharp opposition to the stance of new party leader Feldman. He was again the cause of some controversy later that month, when he declared on television that students protesting against One Nation were "being used by communists and socialists in their agenda to destroy the unity of Australia". Nelson was the party's nominee for speaker in the new parliament, but lost to Labor candidate Ray Hollis. Along with several other One Nation MPs, he used his inaugural speech to parliament on 30 July to declare his intent to pursue further investigation of the Heiner affair, the alleged 1990 shredding of documents relating to a child abuse inquiry during the Goss Labor government.

Nelson continued to spark some controversy throughout his first months in parliament. In early August, he challenged Greek-born Labor backbencher Jim Fouras to "step outside" after Fouras had criticised Nelson's opposition to multiculturalism. He also twice made inadvertent breaches of parliamentary privileges, using the parliamentary crest on letters advertising a One Nation function and referring to himself with the "honourable" title, which as a backbencher he had not been granted. He was repeatedly critical of the anti-immigrant party being labelled as racist, but was himself accused of racism after claiming that there were "Aboriginal children lying drunk in the gutter" in the north Queensland town of Mareeba. Nelson was vocal in his opposition to Aboriginal native title, claiming that the Beattie government's 1998 legislation to establish a state-based regime was "worse than apartheid". He was an ardent supporter of an unsuccessful attempt by independent MP Peter Wellington to initiate citizen initiated referendums in Queensland in November 1998. Nelson was staunchly critical of the media's role in the demise of his One Nation colleague Charles Rappolt, who resigned from parliament in November 1998 before committing suicide. Nelson remained known for his socially conservative views, and was labelled as engaging in gay scare tactics by The Australian after claiming during the 1998 Mulgrave by-election campaign that the Beattie government would legalise same-sex marriage and allow homosexual couples to adopt children if it won the by-election, and thus majority government.

== Resignation to sit as independent ==
Media reports of internal tensions within the party had persisted throughout late 1998 and early 1999, as the state caucus grew increasingly frustrated with a party hierarchy that saw most of the power concentrated in the hands of federal MP and party founder Pauline Hanson and her advisors David Oldfield and David Ettridge. The tensions came to a head in early February 1999, when Hanson, Oldfield and Ettridge attempted to institute a national constitution locking them into absolute control of the state branches and giving them control of the party's finances. In return, the entire Queensland parliamentary party threatened to resign unless a 10-point list of demands for greater internal democracy were met. It was followed only days later by the resignations of three of the party's 10 remaining MPs – Nelson, deputy leader Dorothy Pratt, and Ken Turner. All three announced that they would serve out the remainder of their terms as independents. Nelson was harshly critical of his former party in the days afterwards, declaring it to be "totally undemocratic" and "on the verge of collapse", and claiming that Oldfield and Feldman were conducting a smear campaign against him. The prospect of Nelson joining the National Party in the wake of the defection was briefly discussed, but subsequently ruled out by the National Party.

Nelson's resignation from One Nation had immediate consequences for his role as an MP, as his taxpayer-funded resources, along with those of Pratt and Turner, were slashed by $30,000 a year. Several weeks later, he had his office shifted away from his former colleagues, complaining of heightened tensions and threats being made against him. He was a vocal opponent of the Beattie government's decision to apologise to the victims of the Stolen Generation in May 1999, and repeatedly interjected during the reading of the apology motion into the parliamentary record, defying the speaker's orders to resume his seat. Despite his generally socially conservative views, he was behind an unsuccessful attempt to pass a Private Member's Bill legalising voluntary euthanasia in Queensland. Nelson became the first MP in four years to be suspended from parliament in July 1999 after repeatedly defying the speaker's calls for order during a vocal parliamentary attack on then-health minister Wendy Edmond.

Nelson continued to maintain a reputation as a conservative maverick as an independent MP, and in September 1999, called for the introduction of conscription for the long-term unemployed to supplement Australia's then-peacekeeping operation in East Timor. Although he had earlier supported proposals to legalise prostitution in the state, he voted against such moves by the Beattie government in December 1999, arguing that the laws would be impossible to enforce. He caused some controversy in May 2000 when, along with Dorothy Pratt, he was suspended from parliament for 28 days and threatened with expulsion for pouring a milk churn down the stairs of parliament during a protest against the deregulation of the dairy industry. This meant that Nelson had spent more days suspended from the house than any other MP in more than 25 years.

Nelson recontested his seat as an independent at the 2001 state election, and faced a three-way battle with National Party candidate and local councillor Joe Moro and endorsed One Nation candidate Rosa Lee Long, the president of the party's Tablelands branch and a former Nelson campaign worker. The contest was widely viewed as being too close to call during the campaign, and a poll by the Cairns Post in the last week of the campaign showed the vote almost even between the three conservative candidates and Labor candidate Arthur Yates. He subsequently won only 15 percent of the vote, finishing fourth overall behind the One Nation, Labor and National candidates, with One Nation candidate Long the victor. In his concession speech, he controversially declared that he was "horrified to be a Tablelander at this moment." He has largely remained out of public life since his election defeat, and has not run for any other public office.

Parliament of Queensland
| Preceded by Tom Gilmore Jr. | Member for Tablelands; 1998–2001 | Succeeded by Rosa Lee Long |
