= Tom Gilmore Sr. =

Australian politician (1908–1994)

Tom Gilmore
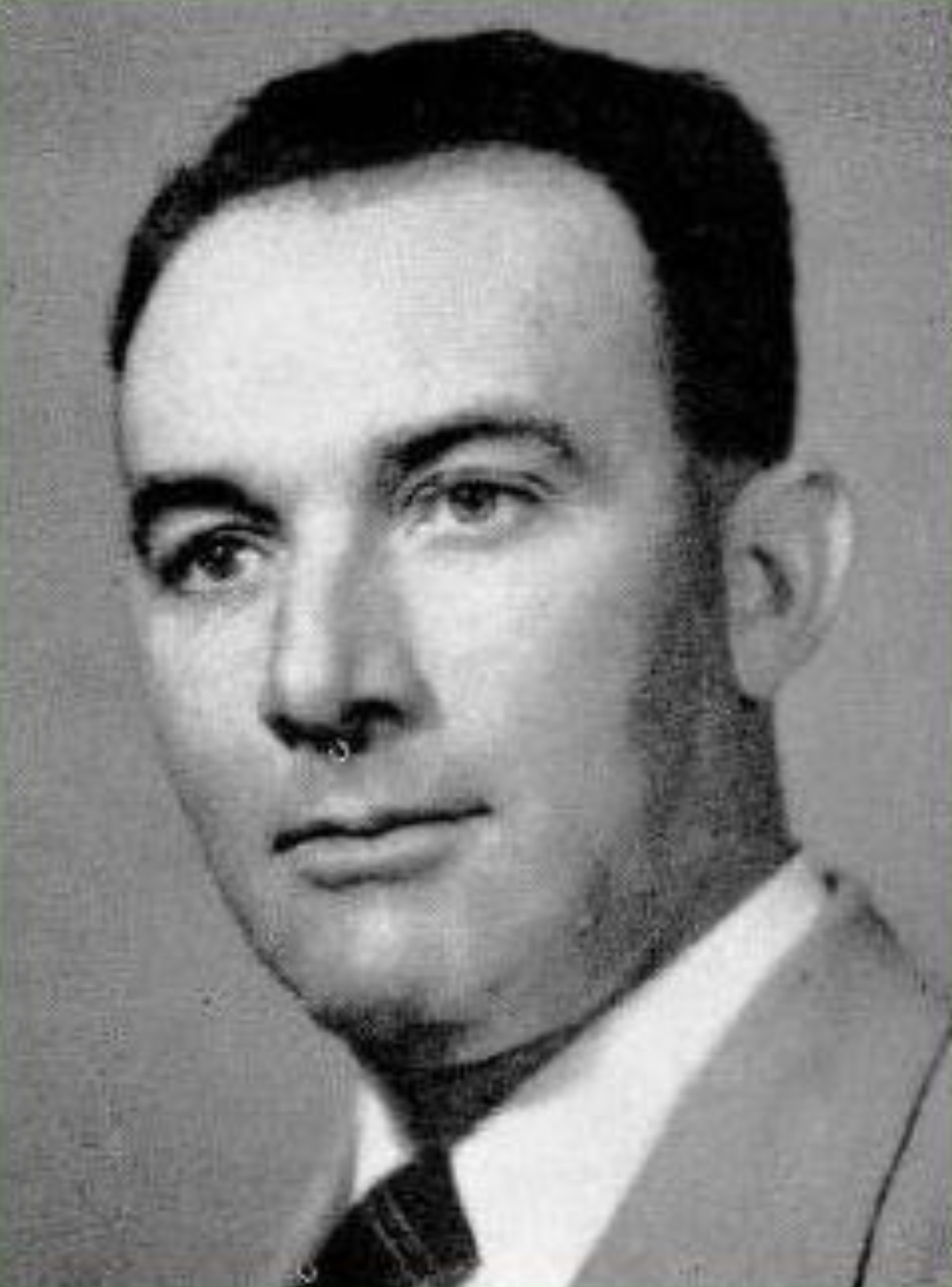

Member of the Australian Parliament for Leichhardt
- In office 10 December 1949 – 28 April 1951
- Preceded by: New seat
- Succeeded by: Harry Bruce

Member of the Queensland Legislative Assembly for Tablelands
- In office 3 August 1957 – 1 June 1963
- Preceded by: Harold Collins
- Succeeded by: Edwin Wallis-Smith

Personal details
- Born: Thomas Vernon Gilmore; 7 May 1908 Wolfram, Queensland, Australia
- Died: 14 November 1994 (aged 86) Queensland, Australia
- Party: Country Party
- Spouse: Anne Campbell MacDonald
- Relations: Tom Gilmore Jr. (son)
- Occupation: Tobacco grower

Thomas Vernon Gilmore Sr. (7 May 1908 – 14 November 1994) was an Australian politician.

Born in Wolfram, Queensland, he was educated at state schools before becoming a sugarcane and tobacco grower at Babinda. He served in the military 1942–47.

In 1949, he was elected to the Australian House of Representatives as the Country Party member for the new seat of Leichhardt, notionally held by Labor. He was defeated by the Labor candidate in 1951 and, after a stint in the Parliament of Queensland as the member for Tablelands (1957–1963) retired to become a grazier and cattle-breeder.

Gilmore died in 1994 at the age of 86.

Parliament of Australia
Preceded by New seat	Member for Leichhardt; 1949–1951	Succeeded by Harry Bruce
Parliament of Queensland
Preceded by Harold Collins	Member for Tablelands; 1957–1963	Succeeded by Edwin Wallis-Smith
