= Electoral district of Tablelands =

Tablelands Queensland—Legislative Assembly
- State: Queensland
- Dates current: 1950–1972; 1986–2009
- Namesake: Atherton Tablelands

Tablelands was an electoral district of the Legislative Assembly in the Australian state of Queensland.

Prior to its abolition, it encompassed towns on the Atherton Tablelands west of Cairns, including Mareeba, Atherton, Ravenshoe, Chillagoe and Mount Molloy. The seat was won by the One Nation Party from the National Party at the 1998 state election. Shaun Nelson, the elected candidate, departed the party and contested the 2001 election as an independent, losing to One Nation's new candidate Rosa Lee Long. Lee Long retained the seat at the 2004 state election and again at the 2006 state election.

In 2008, Tablelands was abolished—with effect at the 2009 state election—by a redistribution undertaken by the Electoral Commission of Queensland. Its former territory and voters were split between the districts of Cook, Hinchinbrook and the new seat of Dalrymple.

There was also an earlier district called Tablelands based in the same region, it existed from 1950 to 1972.

== Members for Tablelands ==
First incarnation (1950–1972)
Member	Party	Term
Harold Collins	Labor	1950–1957
Harold Collins	Queensland Labor	1957
Tom Gilmore Sr.	Country	1957–1963
Edwin Wallis-Smith	Labor	1963–1972
Second incarnation (1986–2009)
Member	Party	Term
Tom Gilmore Jr.	National	1986–1998
Shaun Nelson	One Nation	1998–1999
Shaun Nelson	Independent	1999–2001
Rosa Lee Long	One Nation	2001–2009

== See also ==
- Electoral districts of Queensland
- Members of the Queensland Legislative Assembly by year
- Category:Members of the Queensland Legislative Assembly by name
