= James Kenny (politician) =

Australian politician

Member of the Queensland Legislative Assembly for Cook
- In office 11 May 1929 – 11 May 1935
- Preceded by: Henry Ryan
- Succeeded by: Harold Collins

Personal details
- Born: James Alexander Charles Kenny; 6 December 1898 Cairns, Queensland, Australia
- Died: 24 July 1954 (aged 55) Cairns, Queensland, Australia
- Resting place: Gordonvale Cemetery
- Party: Country and Progressive National Party
- Spouse(s): Ivy Josephine Koppen (m.1920 d.1952), Elizabeth Irvin (m.1954 d.1979)
- Occupation: Businessman

James Alexander Charles Kenny (6 December 1898 – 24 July 1954) was a plumber and politician in Queensland, Australia. He was a Member of the Queensland Legislative Assembly.

== Biography ==
Kenny was born in Cairns, Queensland, the son of James Kenny Snr. and his wife Rosena Cathleen (née Bollard). He was educated at Cairns State School and served in the First Australian Imperial Force in 1917–1918 and was wounded in France in 1918. After World War I he was engaged in mixed businesses at Peeramon, Malanda, and Mareeba. After state politics he was the prices officer in Cairns and for his last six years conducted the business of plumber.

On 9 June 1920 he married Ivy Josephine Koppen and together had a son and a daughter. Ivy died in 1952 and just before his death Kenny married Elizabeth Lily Irvin (died 1979). He died at Cairns in July 1954 and his funeral proceeded from St Paul's Presbyterian Church at Gordonvale to the Gordonvale Cemetery.

== Public career ==
Kenny, a member of the Country and Progressive National Party, won the seat of Cook at the 1929 Queensland state election, defeating the sitting member, Labor's Henry Ryan. Kenny held the seat until 1935, when he stood unsuccessfully for the metropolitan seat of Sandgate.

Parliament of Queensland
Preceded by Henry Ryan	Member for Cook; 1929–1935	Succeeded by Harold Collins
