= Henry Ryan (politician) =

Australian politician (1873–1943)

Member of the Queensland Legislative Assembly for Cook
- In office 22 May 1915 – 11 May 1929
- Preceded by: Henry Douglas
- Succeeded by: James Kenny

Personal details
- Born: Henry Joseph Ryan; 1873 Ballarat, Victoria, Australia
- Died: 17 January 1943 (aged 70) Brisbane, Queensland, Australia
- Resting place: Toowong Cemetery
- Party: Labor
- Spouse: Kate Butler (m.1898)
- Occupation: Businessman

Henry Joseph Ryan (1873 – 17 January 1943) was a member of the Queensland Legislative Assembly.

== Biography ==
Ryan was born at Ballarat, Victoria, the son of Thomas Ryan and his wife Margaret (née O'Brien). He was educated at the Christian Brothers College in Ballarat and on arrival in North Queensland took up mining. After his political career he was a businessman in Brisbane.

On 4 May 1898 he married Kate Butler in Gympie and together had one son. Ryan died in Brisbane in January 1943 and was buried in the Toowong Cemetery.

== Public career ==
Ryan was heavily involved in the trade union movement and was associated with Ted Theodore amongst others in the Australian Workers' Association of Queensland. He was a delegate at the 1913 Rockhampton conference when the AWA was absorbed into the Australian Workers' Union.

He entered state politics at the 1915 Queensland state election when he won the seat of Cook for the Labor Party. Ryan defeated the sitting member for Cook, Henry Douglas of the Queensland Liberal Party, after previously standing unsuccessfully against him at the 1912 state election.

Ryan represented Cook for fourteen years before being defeated by James Kenny of the Country and Progressive National Party in 1929.

Parliament of Queensland
Preceded by Henry Douglas	Member for Cook; 1915–1929	Succeeded by James Kenny
