= Rosa Lee Long =

Australian politician

Mayor of Tablelands Regional Council
- In office 28 April 2012 – 19 March 2016
- Preceded by: Tom Gilmore
- Succeeded by: Joe Paronella

Member of the Queensland Legislative Assembly for Tablelands
- In office 17 February 2001 – 20 March 2009
- Preceded by: Shaun Nelson
- Succeeded by: Constituency abolished

Personal details
- Born: Rosa Theresa Schmid; 2 October 1945 (age 81) Atherton, Queensland, Australia
- Party: One Nation
- Occupation: Small business proprietor (Self–employed)
- Profession: Public servant Businesswoman; Politician

Rosa Therese Lee Long (née Schmid, born 2 October 1945) is a former member of the Legislative Assembly of Queensland representing the electorate of Tablelands in Northern Queensland, Australia for the One Nation Party. Lee Long served three consecutive terms in office between 2001 and 2009.

Prior to the 2009 Queensland state election, the electorate of Tablelands was abolished, and much of its territory was merged with neighbouring Charters Towers to form the new seat of Dalrymple. Lee Long contested the new electorate against Shane Knuth, the Liberal National member for Charters Towers. However, the new seat contained more of Knuth's territory than Lee Long's, and Lee Long took only 44 percent of the two-party vote to Knuth's 55 percent.

Lee Long was the mayor of the Tablelands Region from April 2012 until March 2016.

== Personal life ==
Lee Long was born in Atherton, Queensland, and has three daughters. Lee Long is a widow, and her late husband was of Chinese descent, a fact that aroused considerable interest given One Nation's strong anti-immigration stance.

== Before Parliament ==
Before entering parliament, Lee Long worked as a grazier, a public servant, and owned a small business.

== Parliamentary career ==
Lee Long was elected to the Legislative Assembly of Queensland in 2001 to represent the seat of Tablelands. Tablelands had before 1998 been a safe seat for the National Party, but fell at the 1998 election to Shaun Nelson of the One Nation Party. Lee Long was a campaign worker for Nelson during this election. Nelson subsequently left the party in 1999 amid internal tensions, and recontested the seat at the 2001 election as an independent, losing out to Lee Long. By this point, support for the One Nation party had sharply declined from the party's high point, and Lee Long was one of only three One Nation MPs in the Legislative Assembly.

In her inaugural address to parliament, Lee Long attacked globalisation and the Government's policy of privatisation, blaming them for a decline in the agricultural and mining industries in her electorate.

She was a member of the Legal, Constitutional and Administrative Review Committee from 11 October 2006, and a member of the Estimates Committee in both 2006 and 2008. She also served on the Members' Ethics and Parliamentary Privileges Committee from 18 March 2004 to 15 August 2006, the Scrutiny of Legislation Committee (3 May 2001 – 13 January 2004), and the Select Committee on Travelsafe (2 May 2001 to 13 January 2004).

== Political views ==
Despite the disintegration of the One Nation Party and Pauline Hanson's departure to form a new party, Pauline's United Australia Party, in a television interview leading up to the 2006 state election, Lee Long stated that she still agreed with Hanson's policies: "Pauline Hanson was right back then, she's right now, and we have to continue the fight".

Parliament of Queensland
Preceded by Shaun Nelson	Member for Tablelands; 2001-2009	Succeeded by Seat abolished
