= Tom Gilmore Jr. =

Australian politician

Tom Gilmore Jr. OAM
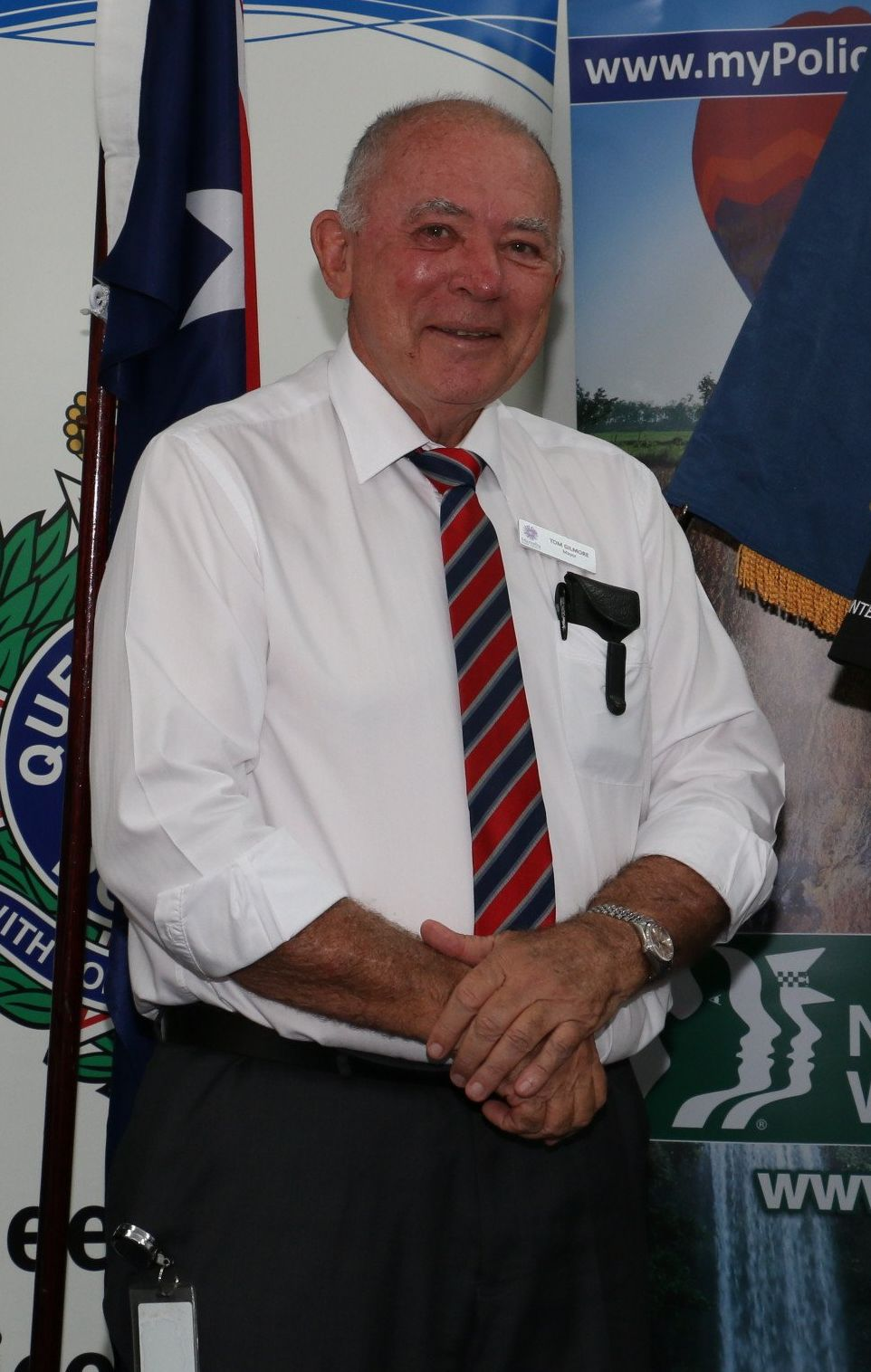
- Tom Gilmore, 2015

Member of the Queensland Legislative Assembly for Tablelands
- In office 1 November 1986 – 13 June 1998
- Preceded by: Constituency established
- Succeeded by: Shaun Nelson

Personal details
- Born: Thomas John George Gilmore; 8 May 1946 Mareeba, Queensland, Australia
- Died: 14 March 2024 (aged 77) Mareeba, Queensland
- Party: National Party
- Spouse: Sally Gilmore
- Relations: Tom Gilmore Sr. (father)
- Occupation: Mayor of Mareeba

Thomas John George Gilmore (8 May 1946 – 14 March 2024) was an Australian politician.

== Early life ==
Gilmore was born in Mareeba. His father, Tom Gilmore Sr., had been a federal and state Country Party politician.

== Politics ==
Gilmore served on Mareeba Shire Council from 1982 to 1987. In 1986 he was elected as the National Party member for Tablelands in the Queensland Legislative Assembly. In 1992 he moved to the front bench as Shadow Minister for Minerals and Energy, a portfolio he held until the Coalition took government in 1996, whereupon he became the Minister. He was defeated in 1998 by One Nation candidate, Shaun Nelson.

In 2000, he was elected to the Mareeba Shire Council.

From 2008 to 2013, Shire of Mareeba was absorbed into the Tablelands Region. During this period Gilmore was mayor of Tablelands Region from 2008 to 2012. After the deamalgamation of the Shire of Mareeba in 2014, he was elected Mayor of Mareeba and then re-elected in 2016.

In October 2019 he announced his retirement as Mayor of Mareeba at the 2020 local government elections.

== Later life ==
Gilmore died at his home on 14 March 2024 in Mareeba aged 77 years. He donated his body to the Human Bequest Program at James Cook University.

== Legacy ==
Gilmore was awarded the Medal of the Order of Australia on 8 June 2020 for services to the Parliament and people of Queensland.

Parliament of Queensland
New seat	Member for Tablelands; 1986–1998	Succeeded by Shaun Nelson
