= Billy Gordon =

Australian politician (1972/1973 – 2022)

Member of the Queensland Legislative Assembly for Cook
- In office 31 January 2015 – 25 November 2017
- Preceded by: David Kempton
- Succeeded by: Cynthia Lui

Personal details
- Born: 1972 or 1973 Innisfail, Queensland, Australia
- Died: 25 November 2022 (aged 49)
- Party: Labor (until 2015); Independent (2015–2022)

William John Gordon (1972 or 1973 – 25 November 2022) was an Indigenous Australian politician. He was a member of the Queensland Legislative Assembly from 2015 to 2017, representing the electorate of Cook.

== Career ==
Hailing from Innisfail, Queensland, Gordon first entered politics as the Labor candidate in the federal seat of Leichhardt for the 2013 election, losing to Liberal National incumbent Warren Entsch. However, he increased his profile enough that he was able to successfully stand in the state seat of Cook, essentially the far northern portion of the federal seat. Gordon was elected as a Labor candidate at the 2015 election before becoming an independent two months later. He retired at the 2017 election.

Gordon was one of the first Indigenous Queensland state MPs in a generation.

== Controversy ==
In 2015, tip-offs to the media led to Gordon publicly acknowledging a criminal history dating back to the 1980s which he had not disclosed to his colleagues, including driving and breaking-and-entering offences, a breach of bail and probation, and an apprehended violence order taken out by his mother.

Gordon's former de facto partner accused him of domestic violence and routinely not filing tax returns to avoid child support payments for his five children.

In response, Premier Annastacia Palaszczuk expelled Gordon from the Labor caucus, and asked the state party organisational wing to have Gordon expelled from the party altogether. She also demanded Cook's resignation. Although Palaszczuk was well aware that the loss of the Cook electorate could put her premiership in jeopardy, she said that, given the circumstances, she had no other choice.

In September 2015, Queensland Police dropped the domestic violence charges against Gordon, citing insufficient evidence. On the same day, police charged a woman with extortion for allegedly attempting to blackmail Gordon by claiming he had sent her an explicit image by SMS.

On 1 June 2016, Gordon was charged with drink driving and unlicensed driving when pulled over at a random traffic stop on the Kennedy Highway at Kuranda, on the Atherton Tableland west of Cairns. He was taken to the Kuranda police station and allegedly returned a blood-alcohol content reading of 0.094.

On 1 July 2016, Gordon pleaded guilty to both charges in the Brisbane Magistrates Court. He was fined $750 and disqualified from driving for four months.

== Retirement ==
Gordon retired from politics at the 2017 election, having confirmed that he would not recontest his seat on 31 October 2017 following the calling of the election.

Gordon died on 25 November 2022, aged 49. It was understood that he was being treated for kidney disease.

Parliament of Queensland
Preceded by David Kempton	Member for Cook; 2015–2017	Succeeded by Cynthia Lui
