= Edwin Wallis-Smith =

Australian politician

Eddie Wallis-Smith

Member of the Queensland Legislative Assembly for Tablelands
- In office 1 June 1963 – 27 May 1972
- Preceded by: Tom Gilmore, Sr.
- Succeeded by: Seat abolished

Member of the Queensland Legislative Assembly for Cook
- In office 27 May 1972 – 7 December 1974
- Preceded by: Bill Wood
- Succeeded by: Eric Deeral

Personal details
- Born: Edwin Wallis-Smith; 3 January 1908 Maryborough, Queensland, Australia
- Died: 14 March 1988 (aged 80) Brisbane, Queensland, Australia
- Party: Labor
- Spouse(s): Edna Elizabeth Langusch (m.1937), Ruth Gibson (m.1951)
- Occupation: Locomotive driver

Edwin Wallis-Smith (3 January 1908 – 14 March 1988) was a member of the Queensland Legislative Assembly.

== Biography ==
Wallis-Smith was born at Maryborough, Queensland, the son of Edwin Alfred Wallis-Smith and his wife Eliza Jane (née Moore). He was educated at Maryborough Central State School and Maryborough Boys Grammar School and in 1937 joined the railway ambulance before becoming a locomotive driver in 1941. From 1941 to 1946 he joined the 2/15 Australian Field Ambulance where he was discharged at the rank of sergeant.

On 23 January 1937 he married Edna Elizabeth Langusch with whom he had one daughter. He married for a second time in 1951, this time to Ruth Gibson. He died in Brisbane in March 1988.

== Public life ==
Wallis-Smith, representing the Labor Party, won the seat of Tablelands at the 1963 Queensland state election. He held the seat until it was abolished before the 1972 state election and Wallis-Smith then moved to the electorate of Cook where he served until 1974 state election.

Parliament of Queensland
| Preceded by Tom Gilmore, Sr. | Member for Tablelands; 1963–1972 | Abolished |
| Preceded by Bill Wood | Member for Cook; 1972–1974 | Succeeded by Eric Deeral |
