= Harold Collins (Australian politician) =

Australian politician

The Honourable Harold Collins
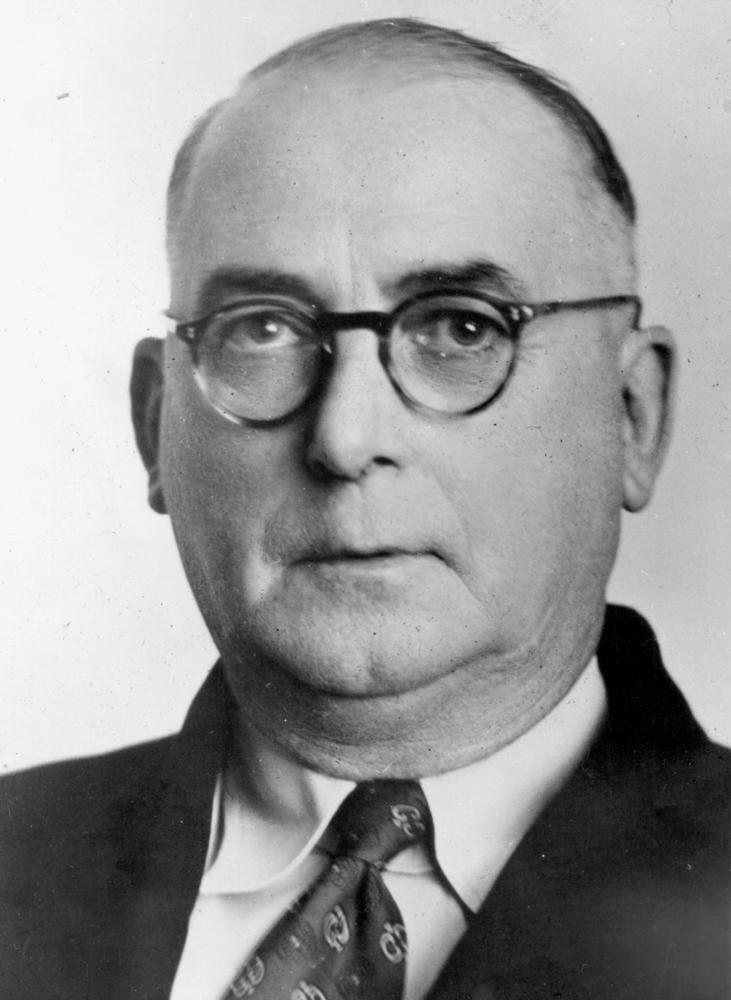

Member of the Queensland Legislative Assembly for Cook
- In office 11 May 1935 – 29 April 1950
- Preceded by: James Kenny
- Succeeded by: Seat abolished

Member of the Queensland Legislative Assembly for Tablelands
- In office 29 April 1950 – 3 August 1957
- Preceded by: Seat established
- Succeeded by: Tom Gilmore Sr.

Personal details
- Born: Harold Henry Collins; 9 August 1887 Alexandra, Victoria, Australia
- Died: 12 July 1962 (aged 74) Brisbane, Queensland, Australia
- Resting place: Hemmant Cemetery
- Party: Labor
- Other political affiliations: Queensland Labor Party
- Spouse: Barbara Catherine Annie McCraw (m. 1915 d. 1958)
- Occupation: Dairy farmer, Maize grower

Harold Henry Collins (9 August 1887 – 12 July 1962) was a politician in Queensland, Australia. He was a Member of the Queensland Legislative Assembly.

== Politics ==
Collins was a member of the Tinaroo Shire Council from 1916 to 1917.

Collins was the Labor member for Cook in the Legislative Assembly of Queensland from 1935 to 1950 and for Tablelands from 1950 to 1957, when he defected to the breakaway Queensland Labor Party.

== Later life ==
Collins died in 1962. He was accorded a state funeral and buried in Brisbane's Hemmant Cemetery.

Parliament of Queensland
Preceded by James Kenny	Member for Cook; 1935–1950	Abolished
New seat	Member for Tablelands; 1950–1957	Succeeded by Tom Gilmore Sr.
