= Bob Scott (Queensland politician) =

Australian politician

Member of the Queensland Legislative Assembly for Cook
- In office 12 November 1977 – 2 December 1989
- Preceded by: Eric Deeral
- Succeeded by: Steve Bredhauer

Personal details
- Born: Robert William Scott; 28 September 1931 Gordonvale, Queensland, Australia
- Died: 19 January 2011 (aged 79) Caboolture, Queensland, Australia
- Party: Labor
- Spouse: Jennifer Helen Forster (m.1954)
- Education: Queensland Institute of Technology
- Occupation: Electrical engineer

Robert William Scott (28 September 1931 – 19 January 2011) was an Australian politician.

He was born in Gordonvale to Robert William Scott and Ina Mary, née McClosky. After attending local state schools he studied for an Associate Diploma in electrical engineering at the Queensland Institute of Technology. As an electrical engineer he worked with the North Queensland Electricity Board in Cairns and Giru. A member of the Labor Party, he was elected to the Queensland Legislative Assembly in 1977 as the member for Cook. From 1983 he was Opposition Spokesman on Northern Development and Aboriginal and Island Affairs, stepping down in 1986. He retired from politics in 1989, and died in Caboolture in 2011.

Parliament of Queensland
Preceded by Eric Deeral	Member for Cook; 1977–1989	Succeeded by Steve Bredhauer
