= Patrick Killoran =

Patrick James Killoran (1922–2010) was a public servant in Queensland, Australia. He was the head of the Queensland Department of Aboriginal and Islander Affairs. He worked as Protector of Islanders on Thursday Island in 1948, before being made Director of the Sub-Department of Native Affairs in 1964, a position maintained until his retirement in 1985.

Killoran remained opposed to the payment of award wages to Indigenous Australian workers, and was implicated in the removal of Aboriginal children from their parents (the Stolen Generations).

He oversaw the police raid on an Aboriginal community at Mapoon, on the Cape York Peninsula. Families were forced from their homes, which were burnt to the ground. This was to make the land available for aluminium mining. The people were then moved 200 kilometres (120 mi) to form the community of New Mapoon.

He also ran as a National Party of Australia candidate for the Queensland state seat of Cook (which included Cape York and the Torres Strait) in 1983, but attracted just 17 per cent of the vote.

Killoran died in 2010.
