= Steve Bredhauer =

Australian politician

The Honourable Steve Bredhauer

Member of the Queensland Legislative Assembly for Cook
- In office 2 December 1989 – 7 February 2004
- Preceded by: Bob Scott
- Succeeded by: Jason O'Brien

Personal details
- Born: Stephen Dominic Bredhauer; 15 February 1958 (age 68) Brisbane, Queensland, Australia
- Party: Labor
- Occupation: Schoolteacher

Stephen Dominic Bredhauer (born 15 February 1958) is a former Australian politician. Born in Brisbane. He was a teacher before entering politics, and joined the Labor Party in 1980. In 1989, he was elected to the Legislative Assembly of Queensland as the member for Cook.

When Labor won government in 1998, he was appointed Minister for Transport and Main Roads, a position he held until his retirement from politics in 2004. He was succeeded by his electorate officer, Jason O'Brien.

Parliament of Queensland
Preceded by Bob Scott	Member for Cook; 1989–2004	Succeeded by Jason O'Brien
