= Results of the 1950 Queensland state election =

1950 Queensland state election results

Queensland state election, 29 April 1950 Legislative Assembly << 1947–1953 >>
Enrolled voters	688,309^{[1]}				
Votes cast	636,750		Turnout	92.51	+1.76
Informal votes	7,088		Informal	1.11	–0.25
Summary of votes by party
Party	Primary votes	%	Swing	Seats	Change
Labor	295,138	46.87	+3.29	42	+7
Liberal	188,331	29.91	+4.18	11	+2
Country	121,689	19.25	–0.24	20	+6
NQ Labor	7,689	1.22	+0.50	1	±0
Ind. Labor	3,509	0.56	–0.52	0	–1
Frank Barnes Labor	2,759	0.44	–3.53	0	–1
Communist	2,351	0.37	–0.89	0	–1
Independent	8,196	1.30	–2.86	1	+1
Total	629,662			75	

This is a list of electoral district results for the 1950 Queensland state election.

== Results by electoral district ==
=== Aubigny ===
1950 Queensland state election: Aubigny
Party	Candidate	Votes	%	±%
Country	Jim Sparkes	6,537	73.6	
Labor	Christopher Schull	1,829	20.6	
Independent	George Legge	514	5.8	
Total formal votes		8,880	99.5	
Informal votes		43	0.5	
Turnout		8,923	93.2	
Country hold		Swing		

=== Balonne ===
1950 Queensland state election: Balonne
Party	Candidate	Votes	%	±%
Labor	John Taylor	2,324	53.9	
Country	Herbert Dearden	1,989	46.1	
Total formal votes		4,313	99.0	
Informal votes		44	1.0	
Turnout		4,357	87.4	
Labor hold		Swing		

=== Barambah ===
1950 Queensland state election: Barambah
Party	Candidate	Votes	%	±%
Country	Joh Bjelke-Petersen	6,881	75.2	
Labor	Donald Christiansen	2,266	24.8	
Total formal votes		9,147	99.3	
Informal votes		67	0.7	
Turnout		9,214	94.2	
Country hold		Swing		

=== Barcoo ===
1950 Queensland state election: Barcoo
Party	Candidate	Votes	%	±%
Labor	Ned Davis	2,828	68.5	
Country	Arthur Chresby	1,300	31.5	
Total formal votes		4,128	99.1	
Informal votes		38	0.9	
Turnout		4,166	88.6	
Labor hold		Swing		

=== Baroona ===
1950 Queensland state election: Baroona
Party	Candidate	Votes	%	±%
Labor	Bill Power	6,439	61.7	
Liberal	Harry Middleton	3,768	36.1	
Communist	Max Julius	223	2.1	
Total formal votes		10,430	98.5	
Informal votes		159	1.5	
Turnout		10,589	91.4	
Labor hold		Swing		

=== Belyando ===
1950 Queensland state election: Belyando
Party	Candidate	Votes	%	±%
Labor	Tom Foley	2,619	58.9	
Country	Reg Colwell	1,826	41.1	
Total formal votes		4,445	99.2	
Informal votes		34	0.8	
Turnout		4,479	90.9	
Labor hold		Swing		

=== Bremer ===
1950 Queensland state election: Bremer
Party	Candidate	Votes	%	±%
Labor	Jim Donald	6,100	65.8	
Liberal	Alan Chambers	3,170	34.2	
Total formal votes		9,270	99.3	
Informal votes		63	0.7	
Turnout		9,333	95.6	
Labor hold		Swing		

=== Brisbane ===
1950 Queensland state election: Brisbane
Party	Candidate	Votes	%	±%
Labor	Johnno Mann	5,942	58.8	
Liberal	John Herbert	4,159	41.2	
Total formal votes		10,101	98.7	
Informal votes		134	1.3	
Turnout		10,235	89.1	
Labor hold		Swing		

=== Bulimba ===
1950 Queensland state election: Bulimba
Party	Candidate	Votes	%	±%
Labor	Bob Gardner	4,024	35.7	
Liberal	John Hamilton	3,982	35.3	
Independent Labor	George Marriott	3,266	29.0	
Total formal votes		11,272	98.8	
Informal votes		138	1.2	
Turnout		11,410	94.3	
Labor gain from Independent Labor		Swing		

==== By-election ====
- This by-election was caused by the result of the election being voided by the Court of Disputed Returns. It was held on 14 April 1951.

1951 Bulimba state by-election
Party	Candidate	Votes	%	±%
Labor	Bob Gardner	4,427	37.7	+2.0
Liberal	John Hamilton	4,323	36.8	+1.5
Independent Labor	George Marriott	2,990	25.5	−3.5
Total formal votes		11,740	99.2	+0.4
Informal votes		99	0.8	−0.4
Turnout		11,839	92.8	−1.5
Labor hold		Swing	N/A	

=== Bundaberg ===
1950 Queensland state election: Bundaberg
Party	Candidate	Votes	%	±%
Labor	Ted Walsh	4,152	44.6	
Frank Barnes Labor	Frank Barnes	2,759	29.6	
Liberal	Frank Row	2,401	25.8	
Total formal votes		9,312	97.6	
Informal votes		230	2.4	
Turnout		9,542	95.5	
Labor gain from Frank Barnes Labor		Swing		

=== Buranda ===
1950 Queensland state election: Buranda
Party	Candidate	Votes	%	±%
Labor	Dick Brown	5,439	53.0	
Liberal	Percy Berry	4,826	47.0	
Total formal votes		10,265	98.9	
Informal votes		114	1.1	
Turnout		10,379	94.4	
Labor hold		Swing		

=== Burdekin ===
1950 Queensland state election: Burdekin
Party	Candidate	Votes	%	±%
Independent	Arthur Coburn	3,955	52.5	
Labor	Ernest Russell	3,318	44.0	
Communist	Jack Penberthy	267	3.5	
Total formal votes		7,540	99.1	
Informal votes		66	0.9	
Turnout		7,606	91.6	
Independent gain from Labor		Swing		

=== Cairns ===
1950 Queensland state election: Cairns
Party	Candidate	Votes	%	±%
Labor	Thomas Crowley	4,275	59.1	
Country	Arthur Farr	2,964	40.9	
Total formal votes		7,239	98.8	
Informal votes		88	1.2	
Turnout		7,327	87.4	
Labor hold		Swing		

=== Callide ===
1950 Queensland state election: Callide
Party	Candidate	Votes	%	±%
Country	Vince Jones	6,038	65.8	
Labor	Patrick Moore	3,138	34.2	
Total formal votes		9,176	97.1	
Informal votes		270	2.9	
Turnout		9,446	94.7	
Country hold		Swing		

=== Carnarvon ===
1950 Queensland state election: Carnarvon
Party	Candidate	Votes	%	±%
Labor	Paul Hilton	4,500	50.8	
Country	Sandy Cameron	4,354	49.2	
Total formal votes		8,834	99.3	
Informal votes		85	0.7	
Turnout		8,919	90.2	
Labor hold		Swing		

=== Carpentaria ===
1950 Queensland state election: Carpentaria
Party	Candidate	Votes	%	±%
Labor	Norm Smith	2,709	62.9	
Country	George Keyes	1,358	31.5	
Independent Labor	Merv Pether	243	5.6	
Total formal votes		4,310	98.6	
Informal votes		61	1.4	
Turnout		4,371	80.7	
Labor hold		Swing		

=== Charters Towers ===
1950 Queensland state election: Charters Towers
Party	Candidate	Votes	%	±%
Labor	Arthur Jones	2,675	59.2	
Liberal	George Ellis	1,643	36.4	
NQ Labor	Victor Hay	201	4.4	
Total formal votes		4,519	97.3	
Informal votes		124	2.7	
Turnout		4,643	96.1	
Labor hold		Swing		

=== Chermside ===
1950 Queensland state election: Chermside
Party	Candidate	Votes	%	±%
Liberal	Alex Dewar	6,910	60.1	
Labor	James Macarthur	4,585	39.9	
Total formal votes		11,495	98.7	
Informal votes		150	1.3	
Turnout		11,645	94.4	
Liberal hold		Swing		

=== Clayfield ===
1950 Queensland state election: Clayfield
Party	Candidate	Votes	%	±%
Liberal	Harold Taylor	7,459	74.6	
Labor	Edmund Roberts	2,539	25.4	
Total formal votes		9,998	99.3	
Informal votes		70	0.7	
Turnout		10,068	91.7	
Liberal hold		Swing		

=== Condamine ===
1950 Queensland state election: Condamine
Party	Candidate	Votes	%	±%
Country	Eric Allpass	5,800	62.1	
Labor	Michael Lyons	3,546	37.9	
Total formal votes		9,346	99.4	
Informal votes		57	0.6	
Turnout		9,403	90.9	
Country hold		Swing		

=== Cook ===
1950 Queensland state election: Cook
Party	Candidate	Votes	%	±%
Country	Carlisle Wordsworth	3,811	50.8	
Labor	Jim Tully	3,690	49.2	
Total formal votes		7,501	98.9	
Informal votes		80	1.1	
Turnout		7,581	88.2	
Country gain from Labor		Swing		

=== Cooroora ===
1950 Queensland state election: Cooroora
Party	Candidate	Votes	%	±%
Country	David Low	6,390	72.6	
Labor	Geoffrey Arnell	2,411	27.4	
Total formal votes		8,801	99.2	
Informal votes		73	0.8	
Turnout		8,874	92.2	
Country hold		Swing		

=== Coorparoo ===
1950 Queensland state election: Coorparoo
Party	Candidate	Votes	%	±%
Liberal	Thomas Hiley	6,899	63.0	
Labor	Erle Wettemeyer	4,047	37.0	
Total formal votes		10,946	99.0	
Informal votes		115	1.0	
Turnout		11,061	93.3	
Liberal hold		Swing		

=== Cunningham ===
1950 Queensland state election: Cunningham
Party	Candidate	Votes	%	±%
Country	Malcolm McIntyre	unopposed		
Country hold		Swing		

=== Darlington ===
1950 Queensland state election: Darlington
Party	Candidate	Votes	%	±%
Country	Tom Plunkett	unopposed		
Country hold		Swing		

=== Fassifern ===
1950 Queensland state election: Fassifern
Party	Candidate	Votes	%	±%
Country	Alf Muller	6,788	76.2	
Labor	Thomas Lythgo	2,125	23.8	
Total formal votes		8,913	99.3	
Informal votes		63	0.7	
Turnout		8,976	93.9	
Country hold		Swing		

=== Fitzroy ===
1950 Queensland state election: Fitzroy
Party	Candidate	Votes	%	±%
Labor	Jim Clark	5,377	61.9	
Liberal	Hugh Douglas	3,313	38.1	
Total formal votes		8,690	99.0	
Informal votes		84	1.0	
Turnout		8,774	93.2	
Labor hold		Swing		

=== Flinders ===
1950 Queensland state election: Flinders
Party	Candidate	Votes	%	±%
Labor	Ernest Riordan	1,907	47.5	
Country	Gordon Stuart	1,610	40.1	
NQ Labor	Victor Casey	291	7.3	
Independent	William Hall	207	5.1	
Total formal votes		4,015	98.6	
Informal votes		58	1.4	
Turnout		4,073	84.5	
Labor hold		Swing		

=== Fortitude Valley ===
1950 Queensland state election: Fortitude Valley
Party	Candidate	Votes	%	±%
Labor	Samuel Brassington	5,853	57.6	
Liberal	Gladstone Walker	3,989	39.3	
Communist	Albert Graham	315	3.1	
Total formal votes		10,157	98.4	
Informal votes		162	1.6	
Turnout		10,319	92.2	
Labor hold		Swing		

==== By-election ====
- This by-election was caused by the death of Samuel Brassington. It was held on 18 November 1950.

1950 Fortitude Valley state by-election
Party	Candidate	Votes	%	±%
Labor	Mick Brosnan	7,508	92.5	+34.9
Communist	Albert Graham	610	7.5	+4.4
Total formal votes		8,118	94.1	−4.3
Informal votes		508	5.9	+4.3
Turnout		8,626		
Labor hold		Swing	N/A	

=== Gregory ===
1950 Queensland state election: Gregory
Party	Candidate	Votes	%	±%
Labor	George Devries	2,594	64.1	
Country	Gordon Lee	1,450	35.9	
Total formal votes		4,044	99.3	
Informal votes		29	0.7	
Turnout		4,073	86.0	
Labor hold		Swing		

=== Haughton ===
1950 Queensland state election: Haughton
Party	Candidate	Votes	%	±%
Labor	Colin McCathie	3,492	46.9	
Liberal	Bill Longeran	2,349	31.5	
NQ Labor	Ernest O'Brien	1,463	19.6	
Communist	Gwendoline Phelan	143	1.9	
Total formal votes		7,447	98.0	
Informal votes		151	2.0	
Turnout		7,598	93.0	
Labor hold		Swing		

=== Hinchinbrook ===
1950 Queensland state election: Hinchinbrook
Party	Candidate	Votes	%	±%
Labor	Cecil Jesson	4,005	55.9	
Liberal	Charles Mylrea	3,158	44.1	
Total formal votes		7,163	98.1	
Informal votes		141	1.9	
Turnout		7,304	90.1	
Labor hold		Swing		

=== Ipswich ===
1950 Queensland state election: Ipswich
Party	Candidate	Votes	%	±%
Labor	Ivor Marsden	5,778	64.0	
Liberal	Ralph Sherrington	3,249	36.0	
Total formal votes		9,027	99.0	
Informal votes		87	1.0	
Turnout		9,114	95.3	
Labor hold		Swing		

=== Isis ===
1950 Queensland state election: Isis
Party	Candidate	Votes	%	±%
Country	Jack Pizzey	5,539	61.9	
Labor	Frank Eastaughffe	3,412	38.1	
Total formal votes		8,951	97.1	
Informal votes		269	2.9	
Turnout		9,220	95.0	
Country hold		Swing		

=== Ithaca ===
1950 Queensland state election: Ithaca
Party	Candidate	Votes	%	±%
Labor	Ned Hanlon	6,380	60.7	
Liberal	Charles Keen	4,137	39.3	
Total formal votes		10,517	98.9	
Informal votes		118	1.1	
Turnout		10,635	94.1	
Labor hold		Swing		

==== By-election ====
- This by-election was caused by the death of Ned Hanlon. It was held on 5 April 1952.

1952 Ithaca state by-election
Party	Candidate	Votes	%	±%
Labor	Leonard Eastment	5,658	62.2	+1.5
Liberal	Douglas Lowndes	3,241	35.6	−3.7
Communist	Edwin Bacon	194	2.1	+2.1
Total formal votes		9,093	99.1	+0.2
Informal votes		80	0.9	−0.2
Turnout		9,173		
Labor hold		Swing	N/A	

=== Kedron ===
1950 Queensland state election: Kedron
Party	Candidate	Votes	%	±%
Liberal	Bruce Pie	6,329	52.0	
Labor	Jim Hadley	5,830	48.0	
Total formal votes		12,159	99.2	
Informal votes		101	0.8	
Turnout		12,260	94.9	
Liberal hold		Swing		

==== By-election ====
- This by-election was caused by the resignation of Bruce Pie. It was held on 14 March 1951.

1951 Kedron state by-election
Party	Candidate	Votes	%	±%
Labor	Eric Lloyd	6,601	51.6	+3.6
Liberal	James Robertson	6,185	48.4	−3.6
Total formal votes		12,786	99.0	−0.2
Informal votes		127	1.0	+0.2
Turnout		12,913	91.2	−3.7
Labor gain from Liberal		Swing	+3.6	

=== Kelvin Grove ===
1950 Queensland state election: Kelvin Grove
Party	Candidate	Votes	%	±%
Labor	Bert Turner	5,785	56.2	
Liberal	James Gibson	4,515	43.8	
Total formal votes		10,300	99.0	
Informal votes		106	1.0	
Turnout		10,406	94.7	
Labor hold		Swing		

=== Keppel ===
1950 Queensland state election: Keppel
Party	Candidate	Votes	%	±%
Labor	Walter Ingram	5,251	56.1	
Country	Harry Beak	4,112	43.9	
Total formal votes		9,363	99.3	
Informal votes		70	0.7	
Turnout		9,433	94.0	
Labor hold		Swing		

==== By-election ====
- This by-election was caused by the death of Walter Ingram. It was held on 25 October 1952.

1952 Keppel state by-election
Party	Candidate	Votes	%	±%
Labor	Viv Cooper	5,272	53.0	−3.1
Country	Alfred Ganter	4,454	44.8	+0.9
Independent Labor	Thomas Kelly	222	2.2	+2.2
Total formal votes		9,948	99.5	+0.2
Informal votes		51	0.5	−0.2
Turnout		9,999	87.2	−6.8
Labor hold		Swing	N/A	

=== Kurilpa ===
1950 Queensland state election: Kurilpa
Party	Candidate	Votes	%	±%
Labor	Tom Moores	5,999	57.4	
Liberal	John Aboud	4,444	42.6	
Total formal votes		10,443	98.5	
Informal votes		157	1.5	
Turnout		10,600	93.5	
Labor hold		Swing		

=== Landsborough ===
1950 Queensland state election: Landsborough
Party	Candidate	Votes	%	±%
Country	Frank Nicklin	unopposed		
Country hold		Swing		

=== Lockyer ===
1950 Queensland state election: Lockyer
Party	Candidate	Votes	%	±%
Liberal	Gordon Chalk	5,564	63.2	
Labor	Andrew Crilly	2,219	25.2	
Independent	Tom Ford	1,019	11.6	
Total formal votes		8,802	99.6	
Informal votes		31	0.4	
Turnout		8,833	93.2	
Liberal hold		Swing		

=== Mackay ===
1950 Queensland state election: Mackay
Party	Candidate	Votes	%	±%
Labor	Fred Graham	4,129	55.0	
Liberal	Noel Weder	3,383	45.0	
Total formal votes		7,512	99.2	
Informal votes		58	0.8	
Turnout		7,570	92.1	
Labor hold		Swing		

=== Mackenzie ===
1950 Queensland state election: Mackenzie
Party	Candidate	Votes	%	±%
Labor	Paddy Whyte	2,184	51.3	
Country	William Holmes	2,076	48.7	
Total formal votes		4,260	98.7	
Informal votes		54	1.3	
Turnout		4,314	89.0	
Labor hold		Swing		

=== Marodian ===
1950 Queensland state election: Marodian
Party	Candidate	Votes	%	±%
Country	James Heading	6,209	69.8	
Labor	Thomas Williams	2,686	30.2	
Total formal votes		8,895	99.4	
Informal votes		53	0.6	
Turnout		8,948	90.2	
Country hold		Swing		

=== Maryborough ===
1950 Queensland state election: Maryborough
Party	Candidate	Votes	%	±%
Labor	David Farrell	6,397	65.5	
Liberal	Robert Hunter	3,377	34.5	
Total formal votes		9,774	98.0	
Informal votes		203	2.0	
Turnout		9,977	96.6	
Labor hold		Swing		

=== Merthyr ===
1950 Queensland state election: Merthyr
Party	Candidate	Votes	%	±%
Labor	Bill Moore	5,948	56.0	
Liberal	Albert Rees	4,669	44.0	
Total formal votes		10,617	98.7	
Informal votes		134	1.3	
Turnout		10,751	93.4	
Labor hold		Swing		

=== Mirani ===
1950 Queensland state election: Mirani
Party	Candidate	Votes	%	±%
Country	Ernie Evans	4,709	63.0	
Labor	Matthew O'Neill	2,764	37.0	
Total formal votes		7,473	99.3	
Informal votes		52	0.7	
Turnout		7,525	92.2	
Country hold		Swing		

=== Mount Coot-tha ===
1950 Queensland state election: Mount Coot-tha
Party	Candidate	Votes	%	±%
Liberal	Kenneth Morris	7,032	60.1	
Labor	Bryan Hurley	4,668	39.9	
Total formal votes		11,700	99.0	
Informal votes		117	1.0	
Turnout		11,817	93.8	
Liberal hold		Swing		

=== Mount Gravatt ===
1950 Queensland state election: Mount Gravatt
Party	Candidate	Votes	%	±%
Labor	Felix Dittmer	6,702	52.3	
Liberal	Edward Knoblanch	5,890	46.0	
Independent	Donald Orr	215	1.7	
Total formal votes		12,807	98.6	
Informal votes		186	1.4	
Turnout		12,993	92.1	
Labor hold		Swing		

=== Mourilyan ===
1950 Queensland state election: Mourilyan
Party	Candidate	Votes	%	±%
Labor	Peter Byrne	3,168	43.5	
Country	Andrew Laurie	2,812	38.6	
NQ Labor	William Batchelor	1,028	14.1	
Communist	Les Sullivan	271	3.7	
Total formal votes		7,279	99.2	
Informal votes		60	0.8	
Turnout		7,339	91.6	
Labor hold		Swing		

=== Mulgrave ===
1950 Queensland state election: Mulgrave
Party	Candidate	Votes	%	±%
Country	Bob Watson	3,559	48.8	
Labor	Charles English	3,208	44.0	
NQ Labor	George Groth	345	4.7	
Communist	Frank Falls	175	2.4	
Total formal votes		7,287	98.9	
Informal votes		84	1.1	
Turnout		7,371	90.9	
Country hold		Swing		

=== Mundingburra ===
1950 Queensland state election: Mundingburra
Party	Candidate	Votes	%	±%
NQ Labor	Tom Aikens	3,348	42.6	
Liberal	William Brackin	2,664	33.7	
Labor	Jim Mahony	1,889	23.9	
Total formal votes		7,901	98.7	
Informal votes		105	1.3	
Turnout		8,006	92.3	
NQ Labor hold		Swing		

=== Murrumba ===
1950 Queensland state election: Murrumba
Party	Candidate	Votes	%	±%
Country	David Nicholson	6,680	65.1	
Labor	Eric Lloyd	3,579	34.9	
Total formal votes		10,259	98.9	
Informal votes		111	1.1	
Turnout		10,370	93.2	
Country hold		Swing		

=== Nash ===
1950 Queensland state election: Nash
Party	Candidate	Votes	%	±%
Labor	Thomas Dunstan	4,584	50.1	
Liberal	Ronald Witham	4,559	49.9	
Total formal votes		9,143	99.4	
Informal votes		52	0.6	
Turnout		9,195	94.1	
Labor hold		Swing		

=== Norman ===
1950 Queensland state election: Norman
Party	Candidate	Votes	%	±%
Liberal	Louis Luckins	5,593	51.2	
Labor	Edward Falk	5,339	48.8	
Total formal votes		10,932	98.9	
Informal votes		121	1.1	
Turnout		11,053	93.3	
Liberal hold		Swing		

=== North Toowoomba ===
1950 Queensland state election: North Toowoomba
Party	Candidate	Votes	%	±%
Labor	Les Wood	4,992	54.4	
Liberal	Ralph Weppner	4,178	45.6	
Total formal votes		9,170	99.2	
Informal votes		70	0.8	
Turnout		9,240	89.0	
Labor hold		Swing		

=== Nundah ===
1950 Queensland state election: Nundah
Party	Candidate	Votes	%	±%
Labor	Frank Roberts	5,624	52.3	
Liberal	William Cook	5,122	47.7	
Total formal votes		10,746	98.9	
Informal votes		123	1.1	
Turnout		10,869	93.8	
Labor hold		Swing		

=== Port Curtis ===
1950 Queensland state election: Port Curtis
Party	Candidate	Votes	%	±%
Labor	Jim Burrows	5,296	57.8	
Liberal	Harold Jensen	3,871	42.2	
Total formal votes		9,167	99.2	
Informal votes		70	0.8	
Turnout		9,237	94.7	
Labor hold		Swing		

=== Rockhampton ===
1950 Queensland state election: Rockhampton
Party	Candidate	Votes	%	±%
Labor	James Larcombe	4,709	51.3	
Liberal	Ron Diamond	4,464	48.7	
Total formal votes		9,173	99.0	
Informal votes		90	1.0	
Turnout		9,263	92.9	
Labor hold		Swing		

=== Roma ===
1950 Queensland state election: Roma
Party	Candidate	Votes	%	±%
Country	William Ewan	2,631	53.3	
Labor	James Kane	2,308	46.7	
Total formal votes		4,939	98.9	
Informal votes		54	1.1	
Turnout		4,993	93.7	
Country hold		Swing		

=== Sandgate ===
1950 Queensland state election: Sandgate
Party	Candidate	Votes	%	±%
Liberal	Eric Decker	6,193	54.0	
Labor	Herbert Robinson	5,273	46.0	
Total formal votes		11,466	98.6	
Informal votes		168	1.4	
Turnout		11,634	94.3	
Liberal hold		Swing		

=== Sherwood ===
1950 Queensland state election: Sherwood
Party	Candidate	Votes	%	±%
Liberal	Tom Kerr	6,765	58.4	
Labor	Robert Mansfield	4,813	41.6	
Total formal votes		11,578	99.2	
Informal votes		96	0.8	
Turnout		11,674	93.4	
Liberal hold		Swing		

=== Somerset ===
1950 Queensland state election: Somerset
Party	Candidate	Votes	%	±%
Country	Duncan MacDonald	5,113	57.7	
Labor	John Perrett	3,740	42.3	
Total formal votes		8,853	99.2	
Informal votes		72	0.8	
Turnout		8,925	93.5	
Country hold		Swing		

=== South Brisbane ===
1950 Queensland state election: South Brisbane
Party	Candidate	Votes	%	±%
Labor	Vince Gair	5,651	56.5	
Liberal	Allan McLeod	4,347	43.5	
Total formal votes		9,998	98.9	
Informal votes		115	1.1	
Turnout		10,113	91.9	
Labor hold		Swing		

=== Southport ===
1950 Queensland state election: Southport
Party	Candidate	Votes	%	±%
Country	Eric Gaven	4,768	49.0	
Labor	Edgar Hill	2,800	28.8	
Independent	William Elson-Green	2,167	22.3	
Total formal votes		9,735	99.6	
Informal votes		36	0.4	
Turnout		9,771	91.0	
Country hold		Swing		

=== Tablelands ===
1950 Queensland state election: Tablelands
Party	Candidate	Votes	%	±%
Labor	Harold Collins	4,033	53.6	
Country	John Gargan	2,992	39.8	
NQ Labor	Tom Mackey	496	6.6	
Total formal votes		7,521	99.3	
Informal votes		50	0.7	
Turnout		7,571	89.9	
Labor hold		Swing		

=== Toowong ===
1950 Queensland state election: Toowong
Party	Candidate	Votes	%	±%
Liberal	Alan Munro	7,101	67.0	
Labor	Frank Venables	3,494	33.0	
Total formal votes		10,595	99.1	
Informal votes		94	0.9	
Turnout		10,689	93.4	
Liberal hold		Swing		

=== Toowoomba ===
1950 Queensland state election: Toowoomba
Party	Candidate	Votes	%	±%
Labor	Jack Duggan	4,858	55.7	
Liberal	Ralph Knight	3,870	44.3	
Total formal votes		8,739	99.0	
Informal votes		78	1.0	
Turnout		8,817	90.5	
Labor hold		Swing		

=== Townsville ===
1950 Queensland state election: Townsville
Party	Candidate	Votes	%	±%
Labor	George Keyatta	3,699	51.6	
Liberal	John Taaffe	2,753	38.4	
NQ Labor	Pat Rooney	517	7.2	
Independent	Robert Baker	198	2.8	
Total formal votes		7,167	98.6	
Informal votes		99	1.4	
Turnout		7,266	86.6	
Labor hold		Swing		

=== Warrego ===
1950 Queensland state election: Warrego
Party	Candidate	Votes	%	±%
Labor	Harry O'Shea	2,829	65.0	
Country	Ernest Parr	1,522	35.0	
Total formal votes		4,351	98.7	
Informal votes		56	1.3	
Turnout		4,407	86.1	
Labor hold		Swing		

==== By-election ====
- This by-election was caused by the death of Harry O'Shea. It was held on 3 March 1951.

1951 Warrego state by-election
Party	Candidate	Votes	%	±%
Labor	John Dufficy	2,223	70.1	+5.1
Country	Victor Boettcher	850	26.8	−8.2
Independent	John Sullivan	96	3.0	+3.0
Total formal votes		3,169	99.4	+0.7
Informal votes		18	0.6	−0.7
Turnout		3,187		
Labor hold		Swing	N/A	

=== Warwick ===
1950 Queensland state election: Warwick
Party	Candidate	Votes	%	±%
Country	Otto Madsen	5,965	68.4	
Labor	Terry Keane	2,758	31.6	
Total formal votes		8,723	99.2	
Informal votes		67	0.8	
Turnout		8,790	93.4	
Country hold		Swing		

=== Whitsunday ===
1950 Queensland state election: Whitsunday
Party	Candidate	Votes	%	±%
Country	Lloyd Roberts	3,416	45.3	
Labor	John Casey	2,748	36.5	
Communist	Fred Paterson	957	12.7	
Independent	Michael McColl	411	5.5	
Total formal votes		7,532	99.0	
Informal votes		76	1.0	
Turnout		7,608	91.6	
Country hold		Swing		

=== Windsor ===
1950 Queensland state election: Windsor
Party	Candidate	Votes	%	±%
Labor	Tom Rasey	5,213	50.1	
Liberal	Alexander Devene	5,184	49.9	
Total formal votes		10,397	99.1	
Informal votes		94	0.9	
Turnout		10,491	93.6	
Labor gain from Liberal		Swing		

=== Wynnum ===
1950 Queensland state election: Wynnum
Party	Candidate	Votes	%	±%
Labor	Bill Gunn	7,103	61.0	
Liberal	Bill Dart	4,548	39.0	
Total formal votes		11,651	99.1	
Informal votes		105	0.9	
Turnout		11,756	95.1	
Labor hold		Swing		

=== Yeronga ===
1950 Queensland state election: Yeronga
Party	Candidate	Votes	%	±%
Liberal	Winston Noble	6,504	58.8	
Labor	Thomas Doyle	4,550	41.2	
Total formal votes		11,054	98.5	
Informal votes		164	1.5	
Turnout		11,218	93.6	
Liberal hold		Swing		

== See also ==
- 1950 Queensland state election
- Candidates of the Queensland state election, 1950
- Members of the Queensland Legislative Assembly, 1950-1953
