= Candidates of the 1950 Queensland state election =

The 1950 state election in Queensland, Australia was held on 29 April 1950.

== By-elections ==
- On 10 September 1949, Ivor Marsden (Labor) was elected to succeed David Gledson (Labor), who had died on 14 May 1949, as the member for Ipswich.
- On 10 September 1949, Tom Moores (Labor) was elected to succeed Kerry Copley (Labor), who had died on 18 July 1949, as the member for Kurilpa.

== Retiring members ==
=== Labor ===
- Harry Bruce MLA (The Tableland)
- Stephen Theodore MLA (Herbert)

=== Country ===
- William Brand MLA (Isis)

=== Liberal ===
- Charles Wanstall MLA (Toowong)

== Candidates ==
Sitting members at the time of the election are shown in bold text.

Electorate	Held by	Labor candidate	Coalition candidate	Other candidates
Aubigny	Country	Christopher Schull	**Jim Sparkes** (CP)	George Legge (Ind)
Balonne	Labor	**John Taylor**	Herbert Dearden (CP)	
Barambah	Country	Donald Christiansen	**Joh Bjelke-Petersen** (CP)	
Barcoo	Labor	**Ned Davis**	Arthur Chresby (CP)	
Baroona	Labor	**Bill Power**	Harry Middleton (Lib)	Max Julius (CPA)
Belyando	Labor	**Tom Foley**	Reg Colwell (CP)	
Bremer	Labor	**Jim Donald**	Alan Chambers (Lib)	
Brisbane	Labor	**Johnno Mann**	John Herbert (Lib)	
Bulimba	Independent Labor	Bob Gardner	John Hamilton (Lib)	**George Marriott** (Ind Lab)
Bundaberg	Frank Barnes Labor	Ted Walsh	Frank Row (Lib)	**Frank Barnes** (FBLP)
Buranda	Labor	**Dick Brown**	Percy Berry (Lib)	
Burdekin	Labor	Ernest Russell		Arthur Coburn* (Ind); Jack Penberthy (CPA)
Cairns	Labor	**Thomas Crowley**	Arthur Farr (CP)	
Callide	Country	Patrick Moore	Vince Jones (CP)	
Carnarvon	Labor	**Paul Hilton**	Sandy Cameron (CP)	
Carpentaria	Labor	**Norm Smith**	George Keyes (CP)	Merv Pether (Ind Lab)
Charters Towers	Labor	**Arthur Jones**	George Ellis (Lib)	Victor Hay (NQLP)
Chermside	Liberal	James Macarthur	Alex Dewar (Lib)	
Clayfield	Liberal	Edmund Roberts	**Harold Taylor** (Lib)	
Condamine	Country	Michael Lyons	Eric Allpass (CP)	
Cook	Labor	Jim Tully	Carlisle Wordsworth (CP)	
Cooroora	Country	Geoffrey Arnell	**David Low** (CP)	
Coorparoo	Liberal	Erle Wettemeyer	**Thomas Hiley** (Lib)	
Cunningham	Country		**Malcolm McIntyre** (CP)	
Darlington	Country		**Tom Plunkett** (CP)	
Fassifern	Country	Thomas Lythgo	**Alf Muller** (CP)	
Fitzroy	Labor	**Jim Clark**	Hugh Douglas (Lib)	
Flinders	Labor	Ernest Riordan	Gordon Stuart (CP)	Victor Casey (NQLP); William Hall (Ind)
Fortitude Valley	Labor	**Samuel Brassington**	Gladstone Walker (Lib)	Albert Graham (CPA)
Gregory	Labor	**George Devries**	Gordon Lee (CP)	
Haughton	Labor	Colin McCathie	Bill Longeran (Lib)	Ernest O'Brien (NQLP); Gwendoline Phelan (CPA)
Hinchinbrook	Labor	**Cecil Jesson**	Charles Mylrea (Lib)	
Ipswich	Labor	**Ivor Marsden**	Ralph Sherrington (Lib)	
Isis	Country	Frank Eastaughffe	Jack Pizzey (CP)	
Ithaca	Labor	**Ned Hanlon**	Charles Keen (Lib)	
Kedron	Liberal	Jim Hadley	**Bruce Pie** (Lib)	
Kelvin Grove	Labor	**Bert Turner**	James Gibson (Lib)	
Keppel	Labor	**Walter Ingram**	Harry Beak (CP)	
Kurilpa	Labor	**Tom Moores**	John Aboud (Lib)	
Landsborough	Country		**Frank Nicklin** (CP)	
Lockyer	Liberal	Andrew Crilly	**Gordon Chalk** (Lib)	Tom Ford (Ind)
Mackay	Labor	**Fred Graham**	Noel Weder (Lib)	
Mackenzie	Labor	Paddy Whyte	William Holmes (CP)	
Marodian	Country	Thomas Williams	**James Heading** (CP)	
Maryborough	Labor	**David Farrell**	Robert Hunter (Lib)	
Merthyr	Labor	**Bill Moore**	Albert Rees (Lib)	
Mirani	Country	Matthew O'Neill	**Ernie Evans** (CP)	
Mount Coot-tha	Liberal	Bryan Hurley	**Kenneth Morris** (Lib)	
Mount Gravatt	Labor	Felix Dittmer	Edward Knoblanch (Lib)	Donald Orr (Ind)
Mourilyan	Labor	Peter Byrne	Andrew Laurie (CP)	William Batchelor (NQLP); Les Sullivan (CPA)
Mulgrave	Country	Charles English	Bob Watson (CP)	Frank Falls (CPA); George Groth (NQLP)
Mundingburra	NQ Labor	Jim Mahony	William Brackin (Lib)	**Tom Aikens** (NQLP)
Murrumba	Country	Eric Lloyd	David Nicholson (CP)	
Nash	Labor	**Thomas Dunstan**	Ronald Witham (Lib)	
Norman	Liberal	Edward Falk	**Louis Luckins** (Lib)	
North Toowoomba	Labor	Les Wood	Ralph Weppner (Lib)	
Nundah	Labor	**Frank Roberts**	William Cook (Lib)	
Port Curtis	Labor	**Jim Burrows**	Harold Jensen (Lib)	
Rockhampton	Labor	**James Larcombe**	Ron Diamond (Lib)	
Roma	Country	James Kane	William Ewan (CP)	
Sandgate	Liberal	Herbert Robinson	**Eric Decker** (Lib)	
Sherwood	Liberal	Robert Mansfield	**Tom Kerr** (Lib)	
Somerset	Country	John Perrett	**Duncan MacDonald** (CP)	
South Brisbane	Labor	**Vince Gair**	Allan McLeod (Lib)	
Southport	Country	Edgar Hill	Eric Gaven (CP)	William Elson-Green (Ind)
Tablelands	Labor	**Harold Collins**	John Gargan (CP)	Tom Mackey (NQLP)
Toowong	Liberal	Frank Venables	Alan Munro (Lib)	
Toowoomba	Labor	**Jack Duggan**	Ralph Knight (Lib)	
Townsville	Labor	**George Keyatta**	John Taaffe (Lib)	Robert Baker (Ind); Pat Rooney (NQLP)
Warrego	Labor	**Harry O'Shea**	Ernest Parr (CP)	
Warwick	Country	Terry Keane	**Otto Madsen** (CP)	
Whitsunday	Country	John Casey	Lloyd Roberts (CP)	Michael McColl (Ind); **Fred Paterson** (CPA)
Windsor	Liberal	Tom Rasey	Alexander Devene (Lib)	
Wynnum	Labor	**Bill Gunn**	Bill Dart (Lib)	
Yeronga	Liberal	Thomas Doyle	Winston Noble (Lib)	

== See also ==
- 1950 Queensland state election
- Members of the Queensland Legislative Assembly, 1947–1950
- Members of the Queensland Legislative Assembly, 1950–1953
- List of political parties in Australia

== Bibliography ==
- Hughes, Colin A. (1974). Voting for the Queensland legislative assembly, 1890-1964. Canberra: Dept. of Political Science, Research School of Social Sciences, Australian National University. ISBN 0-7081-0301-4.
