= Members of the Queensland Legislative Assembly, 1950–1953 =

This is a list of members of the 32nd Legislative Assembly of Queensland from 1950 to 1953, as elected at the 1950 state election held on 29 April 1950.

The election followed a redistribution which created 15 new seats in the Assembly.

Name	Party	Electorate	Term in office
Tom Aikens	NQLP	Mundingburra	1944–1977
Eric Allpass	Country	Condamine	1950–1953
Joh Bjelke-Petersen	Country	Barambah	1947–1987
Samuel Brassington^{[1]}	Labor	Fortitude Valley	1927–1932, 1933–1950
Mick Brosnan^{[1]}	Labor	Fortitude Valley	1950–1957
Dick Brown	Labor	Buranda	1947–1957
Jim Burrows	Labor	Port Curtis	1947–1963
Peter Byrne	Labor	Mourilyan	1950–1969
Gordon Chalk	Liberal	Lockyer	1947–1976
Jim Clark	Labor	Fitzroy	1935–1960
Arthur Coburn	Independent	Burdekin	1950–1969
Hon Harold Collins	Labor	Tablelands	1935–1957
Viv Cooper^{[6]}	Labor	Keppel	1952–1957
Thomas Crowley	Labor	Cairns	1947–1956
Ned Davis	Labor	Barcoo	1943–1961
Eric Decker	Liberal	Sandgate	1941–1953
Hon George Devries	Labor	Gregory	1941–1957
Alex Dewar	Liberal	Chermside	1950–1969
Felix Dittmer	Labor	Mount Gravatt	1950–1957
Jim Donald	Labor	Bremer	1946–1969
John Dufficy^{[2]}	Labor	Warrego	1951–1969
Hon Jack Duggan	Labor	Toowoomba	1935–1957, 1958–1969
Thomas Dunstan	Labor	Nash	1915–1929, 1935–1953
Leonard Eastment^{[5]}	Labor	Ithaca	1952–1956
Ernie Evans	Country	Mirani	1947–1965
William Ewan	Country	Roma	1950–1953, 1957–1967
David Farrell	Labor	Maryborough	1938–1953
Hon Tom Foley	Labor	Belyando	1919–1960
Hon Vince Gair	Labor	South Brisbane	1932–1960
Bob Gardner^{[4]}	Labor	Bulimba	1950–1957
Eric Gaven	Country	Southport	1950–1966
Fred Graham	Labor	Mackay	1943–1969
Bill Gunn	Labor	Wynnum	1944–1966
Hon Ned Hanlon^{[5]}	Labor	Ithaca	1926–1952
James Heading	Country	Marodian	1947–1960
Thomas Hiley	Liberal	Coorparoo	1944–1966
Hon Paul Hilton	Labor	Carnarvon	1935–1963
Walter Ingram^{[6]}	Labor	Keppel	1944–1952
Cecil Jesson	Labor	Hinchinbrook	1935–1960
Hon Arthur Jones	Labor	Charters Towers	1929–1932, 1939–1960
Vince Jones	Country	Callide	1950–1971
Tom Kerr	Liberal	Sherwood	1943–1956
George Keyatta	Labor	Townsville	1939–1960
Hon James Larcombe	Labor	Rockhampton	1912–1929, 1932–1956
Eric Lloyd^{[3]}	Labor	Kedron	1951–1972
David Low	Country	Cooroora	1947–1974
Louis Luckins	Liberal	Norman	1941–1953
Otto Madsen	Country	Warwick	1947–1963
Hon Johnno Mann	Labor	Brisbane	1936–1969
Ivor Marsden	Labor	Ipswich	1949–1966
Hon Colin McCathie	Labor	Haughton	1950–1960
Duncan MacDonald	Country	Somerset	1938–1953
Malcolm McIntyre	Country	Cunningham	1944–1953
Hon Bill Moore	Labor	Merthyr	1940–1957
Tom Moores	Labor	Kurilpa	1949–1957
Kenneth Morris	Liberal	Mount Coot-tha	1944–1963
Alf Muller	Country	Fassifern	1935–1969
Alan Munro	Liberal	Toowong	1950–1966
David Nicholson	Country	Murrumba	1950–1972
Frank Nicklin	Country	Landsborough	1932–1968
Dr Winston Noble	Liberal	Yeronga	1950–1964
Harry O'Shea^{[2]}	Labor	Warrego	1941–1950
Bruce Pie^{[3]}	Liberal	Kedron	1941–1943, 1944–1951
Jack Pizzey	Country	Isis	1950–1968
Tom Plunkett	Country	Darlington	1929–1957
Hon Bill Power	Labor	Baroona	1935–1960
Tom Rasey	Labor	Windsor	1950–1957
Hon Ernest Riordan	Labor	Flinders	1936–1944, 1950–1954
Frank Roberts	Labor	Nundah	1947–1956
Lloyd Roberts	Country	Whitsunday	1950–1961
Norm Smith	Labor	Carpentaria	1941–1960
Jim Sparkes	Country	Aubigny	1932–1935, 1941–1960
Harold Taylor	Liberal	Clayfield	1947–1963
John Taylor	Labor	Balonne	1944–1957
Bert Turner	Labor	Kelvin Grove	1941–1957
Hon Ted Walsh	Labor	Bundaberg	1935–1947, 1950–1969
Bob Watson	Country	Mulgrave	1950–1953, 1957–1959
Paddy Whyte	Labor	Mackenzie	1950–1956
Les Wood	Labor	North Toowoomba	1946–1947, 1950–1958
Carlisle Wordsworth	Country	Cook	1950–1953, 1959–1960

^{1} On 4 October 1950, the Labor member for Fortitude Valley and Speaker of the Legislative Assembly, Samuel Brassington, died. Labor candidate Mick Brosnan won the resulting by-election on 18 November 1950.
^{2} On 4 November 1950, the Labor member for Warrego, Harry O'Shea, died. Labor candidate John Dufficy won the resulting by-election on 3 March 1951.
^{3} On 6 January 1951, the Liberal member for Kedron, Bruce Pie, resigned. Labor candidate Eric Lloyd won the resulting by-election on 14 April 1951.
^{4} At the 1950 state election, Labor candidate Bob Gardner won the seat of Bulimba by 42 votes against his Liberal opponent, J. E. Hamilton. A petition was lodged on 24 July 1950 against Gardner's return, and the election was declared void on the basis of errors in counting by the returning officer on 18 January 1951. Gardner won the resulting by-election on 14 April 1951.
^{5} On 15 January 1952, the Labor member for Ithaca and Premier of Queensland, Ned Hanlon, died. At the resulting by-election on 5 April 1952, Labor candidate Leonard Eastment was elected.
^{6} On 24 July 1952, the Labor member for Keppel, Walter Ingram, died. Labor candidate Viv Cooper won the resulting by-election on 25 October 1952.

== See also ==
- 1950 Queensland state election
- Hanlon Ministry (Labor) (1946–1952)
- Gair Ministry (Labor) (1952–1957)
