= First Cooper ministry =

The Cooper Ministry was a ministry of the Government of Queensland and was led by Labor Premier Frank Cooper. It succeeded the Forgan Smith Ministry on 16 September 1942 following Forgan Smith's resignation from the Ministry after over 10 years as Premier. The ministry was followed by the Hanlon Ministry on 7 March 1946 following Cooper's own resignation.

== First ministry ==
On 16 September 1942, the Governor, Sir Leslie Orme Wilson, designated 10 principal executive offices of the Government, appointed Vince Gair to the Executive Council to fill the vacancy left by Forgan Smith's resignation, and appointed the following Members of the Legislative Assembly of Queensland to the Ministry as follows:

Office	Minister
Premier; Chief Secretary; Treasurer	Frank Cooper
Deputy Premier; Secretary for Health; Secretary for Home Affairs	Ned Hanlon
Secretary for Agriculture and Stock	Frank Bulcock (until 17 December 1942)^{[1]}
Secretary for Public Works	Harry Bruce
Secretary for Labour and Industry^{[1]}	Tom Foley
Minister for Transport	James Larcombe
Attorney-General	David Gledson
Secretary for Public Lands	Ted Walsh
Secretary for Public Instruction	Arthur Jones
Secretary for Mines	Vince Gair
Secretary for Agriculture and Stock	Thomas Lewis Williams (from 17 December 1942)^{[1]}

^{1} Frank Bulcock resigned on 15 December 1942 to take up an appointment as Commonwealth Director-General of Agriculture. On 17 December 1942, Thomas Lewis Williams was appointed in his stead to the Ministry. Additionally, Foley's portfolio was renamed from "Labour and Industry" to "Labour and Employment".

== Second ministry ==
Labor was re-elected at the 1944 election and the Ministry was reconstituted on 27 April 1944. The Ministers served until the resignation of Frank Cooper on 7 March 1946 and the formation of a new ministry under Deputy Premier Ned Hanlon.

Office	Minister
Premier; Chief Secretary	Frank Cooper
Deputy Premier; Treasurer	Ned Hanlon
Secretary for Health; Secretary for Home Affairs	Tom Foley
Secretary for Public Works	Harry Bruce
Secretary for Public Lands	Arthur Jones
Attorney-General	David Gledson
Secretary for Public Instruction	James Larcombe
Minister for Transport	Ted Walsh
Secretary for Labour and Employment; Secretary for Mines	Vince Gair
Secretary for Agriculture and Stock	Thomas Lewis Williams

== Notes ==
Preceded by Forgan Smith Ministry	Cooper Ministry; 1942–1946	Succeeded by Hanlon Ministry
