= Forgan Smith ministry =

Ministry of the Government of Queensland, Australia from 1932 to 1942

The Forgan Smith Ministry was a ministry of the Government of Queensland and was led by Labor Premier William Forgan Smith. It succeeded the Moore Ministry on 18 June 1932, seven days after Arthur Edward Moore's CPNP government was defeated at the 1932 state election. The ministry was followed by the Cooper Ministry on 16 September 1942 following Forgan Smith's retirement from politics.

== First ministry ==
On 18 June 1932, the Governor, Sir Leslie Orme Wilson, designated 10 principal executive offices of the Government, and appointed the following Members of the Legislative Assembly of Queensland to the Ministry as follows:

Office	Minister
Premier; Chief Secretary; Treasurer	William Forgan Smith
Deputy Premier; Secretary for Public Lands	Percy Pease
Attorney-General	John Mullan
Home Secretary	Ned Hanlon
Secretary for Labour and Industry	Maurice Hynes
Minister for Transport	John Dash
Secretary for Mines	James Stopford
Secretary for Public Instruction	Frank Cooper
Secretary for Agriculture and Stock	Frank Bulcock
Secretary for Public Works	Harry Bruce

== Second ministry ==
Labor was re-elected at the 1935 election and the Ministry was reconstituted on 21 May 1935.

Office	Minister
Premier; Chief Secretary; Treasurer	William Forgan Smith
Deputy Premier; Secretary for Public Lands	Percy Pease
Secretary for Labour and Industry	Maurice Hynes
Secretary for Mines	James Stopford (until 30 November 1936)
Attorney-General	John Mullan
Secretary for Public Works	Harry Bruce
Secretary for Public Instruction	Frank Cooper
Secretary for Agriculture and Stock	Frank Bulcock
Secretary for Health; Secretary for Home Affairs	Ned Hanlon
Minister for Transport	John Dash
Secretary for Mines	Tom Foley (from 17 December 1936)

== Third ministry ==
Labor was re-elected at the 1938 election and the Ministry was reconstituted on 12 April 1938.

Office	Minister
Premier; Chief Secretary	William Forgan Smith
Deputy Premier; Secretary for Public Lands	Percy Pease (until 17 September 1940)
Secretary for Labour and Industry	Maurice Hynes (until 27 March 1939)
Attorney-General	John Mullan (until 14 November 1940)
Secretary for Agriculture and Stock	Frank Bulcock
Deputy Premier (from 24 September 1940); Treasurer	Frank Cooper
Secretary for Health; Secretary for Home Affairs	Ned Hanlon
Secretary for Mines (until 12 April 1939); Secretary for Labour and Industry (from 12 April 1939)	Tom Foley
Secretary for Public Works; Secretary for Public Instruction	Harry Bruce
Minister for Transport	John Dash (until 4 August 1939)
Minister without portfolio (until 12 April 1939); Secretary for Mines (12 April–4 August 1939); Minister for Transport (from 4 August 1939)	James Larcombe (from 16 February 1939)
Minister without portfolio (until 4 August 1939); Secretary for Mines (from 4 August 1939)	David Gledson (from 16 February 1939)
Secretary for Public Lands	Ted Walsh (from 24 September 1940)
Attorney-General	John O'Keefe (from 14 November 1940)

== Fourth ministry ==
Labor was re-elected at the 1941 election and the Ministry was reconstituted on 16 April 1941. The Ministers served until the resignation of William Forgan Smith on 16 September 1942 and the formation of a new ministry under Deputy Premier Frank Cooper.

Office	Minister
Premier; Chief Secretary; Secretary for Public Instruction (8 December 1941 – 9 February 1942)	William Forgan Smith
Deputy Premier; Treasurer	Frank Cooper
Secretary for Health; Secretary for Home Affairs	Ned Hanlon
Secretary for Agriculture and Stock	Frank Bulcock
Secretary for Public Works; Secretary for Public Instruction (until 8 December 1941)	Harry Bruce
Secretary for Labour and Industry	Tom Foley
Minister for Transport	James Larcombe
Secretary for Mines (until 8 December 1941); Attorney-General (from 8 December 1941)	David Gledson
Secretary for Public Lands	Ted Walsh
Attorney-General (until 8 December 1941); Secretary for Mines (8 December 1941 – 27 January 1942)	John O'Keefe (until 27 January 1942)^{[D]}
Secretary for Public Instruction; Secretary for Mines	Arthur Jones (from 9 February 1942)

^{D} John O'Keefe died on 27 January 1942. On 9 February, Arthur Jones was appointed to the Ministry.

Preceded by Moore Ministry (Queensland)	Forgan Smith Ministry; 1932–1942	Succeeded by Cooper Ministry
