= Gair ministry =

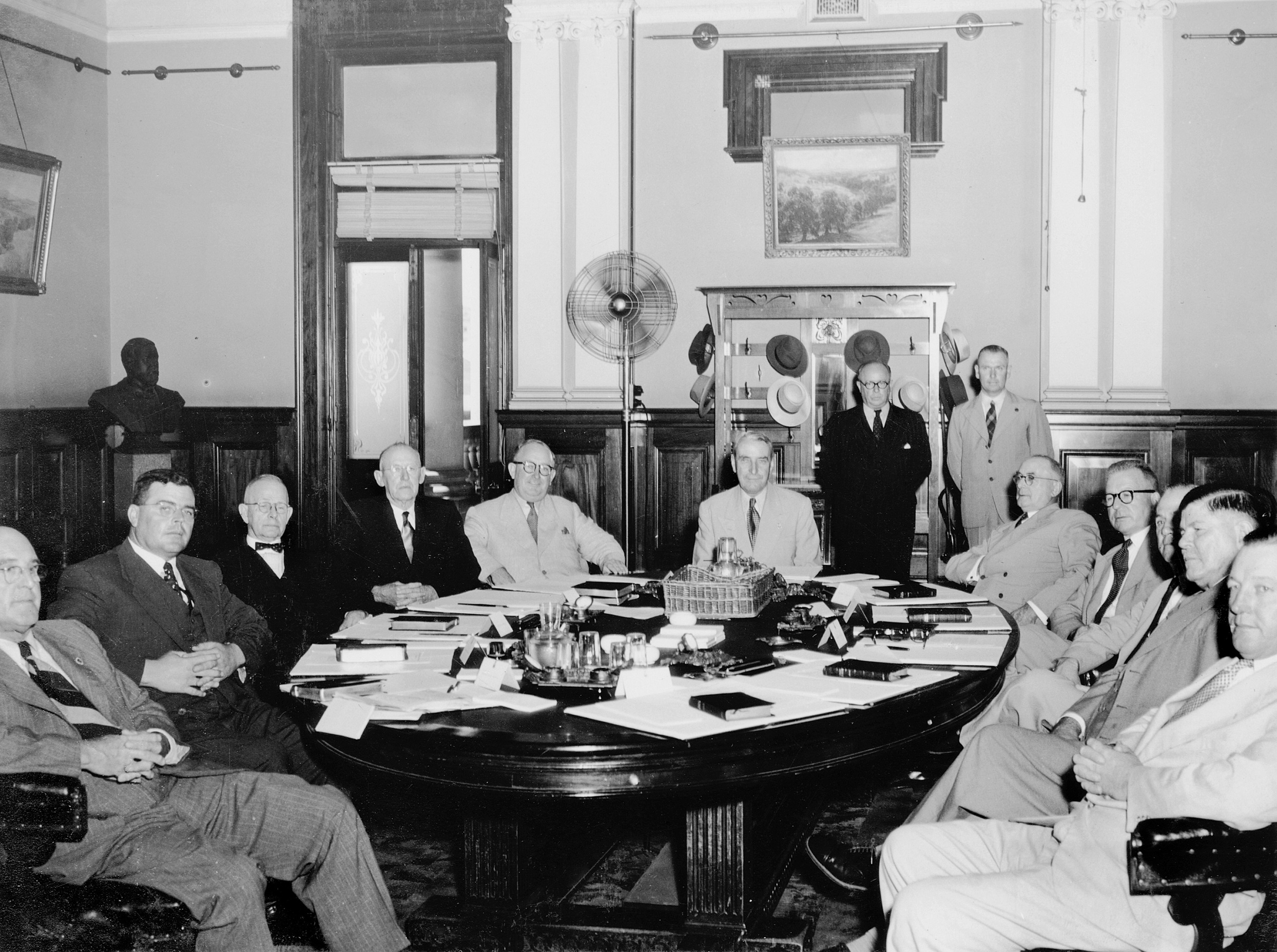
First Gair Ministry, 1952

The Gair Ministry was a ministry of the Government of Queensland and was led by Labor Premier Vince Gair. It succeeded the Hanlon Ministry on 17 January 1952 following Ned Hanlon's death two days earlier. On 26 April 1957, Gair and most of the Ministry were expelled from the Labor Party and formed the Queensland Labor Party (QLP), retaining the ministry but losing the confidence of the Assembly. The ministry was followed by the Nicklin Ministry on 12 August 1957 following the defeat of both Labor and the QLP at the resulting election.

== First ministry ==
On 17 January 1952, the Governor, Sir John Lavarack, designated 11 principal executive offices of the Government, appointed former minister Ted Walsh to the Executive Council to fill the vacancy left by Hanlon's death, and appointed the following Members of the Legislative Assembly of Queensland to the Ministry as follows. The initial form of the Ministry was almost unchanged from its predecessor.

| Office | Minister |
|---|---|
| Premier; Chief Secretary | Vince Gair |
| Deputy Premier; Secretary for Public Lands and Irrigation | Tom Foley |
| Secretary for Agriculture and Stock | Harold Collins |
| Attorney-General | James Larcombe (until 10 March 1952) |
| Secretary for Labour and Industry | Arthur Jones |
| Minister for Transport | Jack Duggan |
| (until 10 March 1952:) Secretary for Mines Secretary for Immigration (from 10 March 1952:) Attorney-General | William Power |
| Secretary for Public Instruction | George Devries |
| Secretary for Health; Secretary for Home Affairs | Bill Moore |
| Secretary for Public Works; Secretary for Housing; Secretary for Local Government (until 1 May 1952) | Paul Hilton |
| Treasurer | Ted Walsh |
| Secretary for Mines; Secretary for Immigration | Ernest Riordan (from 10 March 1952) |

== Second ministry ==
On 16 March 1953, the Governor, Sir John Lavarack, designated 11 principal executive offices of the Government and appointed the following Members of the Legislative Assembly of Queensland to the Ministry as follows. No portfolios changed although the ordering did — it had the effect of promoting Jack Duggan and Ted Walsh.

| Office | Minister |
|---|---|
| Premier; Chief Secretary | Vince Gair |
| Deputy Premier; Minister for Transport | Jack Duggan |
| Secretary for Public Lands and Irrigation | Tom Foley |
| Treasurer | Ted Walsh |
| Secretary for Agriculture and Stock | Harold Collins |
| Secretary for Labour and Industry | Arthur Jones |
| Secretary for Health; Secretary for Home Affairs | Bill Moore |
| Attorney-General | William Power |
| Secretary for Public Works; Secretary for Housing | Paul Hilton |
| Secretary for Public Instruction | George Devries |
| Secretary for Mines; Secretary for Immigration | Ernest Riordan (until 9 December 1954) |
| Secretary for Mines; Secretary for Immigration | Colin McCathie (from 22 December 1954) |

== Third ministry ==
On 28 May 1956, the Governor, Sir John Lavarack, designated 11 principal executive offices of the Government and appointed the following Members of the Legislative Assembly of Queensland to the Ministry as follows. It represented a reshuffle of the Ministry, with some portfolios being transferred and Foley being demoted. Foley left the ministry just over two weeks later following the verdict of a royal commission into land leases which found him guilty of three counts of corrupt conduct.

On 18 April 1957, the Queensland Central Executive of the Labor Party passed a vote of no confidence in Premier Gair, and on 24 April, despite having gained a unanimous vote of support from the Cabinet, he was expelled from the Labor Party. On 26 April, Gair convened a meeting of 25 MLAs, including all of the Cabinet except Deputy Premier Jack Duggan and two ex-Labor Independents, and formed the Queensland Labor Party with those present. All these were also expelled from the party. Duggan resigned from the ministry on 29 April and became leader of the Labor Party — Thomas Moores was sworn in to replace him on 7 May. On 13 June, following denial of supply in parliament, an election was called for 3 August, at which the Government and the Labor Party were defeated by the Country-Liberal coalition led by Frank Nicklin. The ministry was succeeded by the Nicklin Ministry on 12 August 1957.

| Office | Minister |
|---|---|
| Premier; Chief Secretary | Vince Gair |
| Deputy Premier; Minister for Transport | Jack Duggan (until 29 April 1957) |
| Treasurer; Deputy Premier (from 7 June 1957) | Ted Walsh |
| Secretary for Agriculture and Stock | Harold Collins |
| Secretary for Labour and Industry | Arthur Jones |
| Secretary for Health; Secretary for Home Affairs | Bill Moore |
| Attorney-General | William Power |
| Secretary for Public Lands and Irrigation | Paul Hilton |
| Secretary for Mines | Tom Foley (until 14 June 1956) |
| Secretary for Public Instruction (until 22 June 1956); Secretary for Mines (from 22 June 1956) | George Devries (until 13 July 1957) |
| Secretary for Public Works; Secretary for Housing; Secretary for Immigration | Colin McCathie |
| Secretary for Public Instruction | Les Diplock (from 22 June 1956) |
| Minister for Transport | Thomas Moores (from 7 May 1957) |

== Notes ==
| Preceded by Hanlon Ministry | Gair Ministry; 1952–1957 | Succeeded by Nicklin Ministry |
