= Electoral results for the district of Marodian =

Queensland state electoral result

This is a list of electoral results for the electoral district of Marodian in Queensland state elections.

== Members for Marodian ==
Member	Party	Term
James Heading	Country	1950–1960

== Election results ==
=== Elections in the 1950s ===
1957 Queensland state election: Marodian
Party	Candidate	Votes	%	±%
Country	James Heading	6,307	75.3	−24.7
Labor	William Weir	2,073	24.7	+24.7
Total formal votes		8,380	98.4	
Informal votes		135	1.6	
Turnout		8,515	95.3	
Country hold		Swing	−24.7	

1956 Queensland state election: Marodian
Party	Candidate	Votes	%	±%
Country	James Heading	unopposed		
Country hold		Swing		

1953 Queensland state election: Marodian
Party	Candidate	Votes	%	±%
Country	James Heading	5,748	67.6	−2.2
Labor	Sydney Campbell	2,754	32.4	+2.2
Total formal votes		8,502	99.1	−0.3
Informal votes		79	0.9	+0.3
Turnout		8,581	93.3	+3.1
Country hold		Swing	−2.2	

1950 Queensland state election: Marodian
Party	Candidate	Votes	%	±%
Country	James Heading	6,209	69.8	
Labor	Thomas Williams	2,686	30.2	
Total formal votes		8,895	99.4	
Informal votes		53	0.6	
Turnout		8,948	90.2	
Country hold		Swing		
