= Hanlon ministry =

The Hanlon Ministry was a ministry of the Government of Queensland and was led by Labor Premier Ned Hanlon. It succeeded the Cooper Ministry on 7 March 1946 following Frank Cooper's resignation from the Ministry. The ministry was followed by the Gair Ministry on 17 January 1952 following Hanlon's death in office two days earlier.

== First ministry ==
On 7 March 1946, the Governor, Sir Leslie Orme Wilson, designated 10 principal executive offices of the Government, appointed Harold Collins to the Executive Council to fill the vacancy left by Cooper's resignation, and appointed the following Members of the Legislative Assembly of Queensland to the Ministry as follows:

Office	Minister
Premier; Chief Secretary	Ned Hanlon
Deputy Premier; Minister for Transport	Ted Walsh
Secretary for Health; Secretary for Home Affairs	Tom Foley
Secretary for Public Works	Harry Bruce
Secretary for Public Lands	Arthur Jones
Attorney-General	David Gledson
Treasurer	James Larcombe
Secretary for Labour and Employment; Secretary for Mines	Vince Gair
Secretary for Public Instruction	Thomas Lewis Williams
Secretary for Agriculture and Stock	Harold Collins

== Second ministry ==
On 15 May 1947, following the state election, the Governor, Sir John Lavarack, designated 10 principal executive offices of the Government, appointed William Power and Jack Duggan to the Executive Council to fill the vacancy left by Walsh's loss of his parliamentary seat and Williams's retirement, and appointed the following Members of the Legislative Assembly of Queensland to the Ministry as follows:

Office	Minister
Premier; Chief Secretary	Ned Hanlon
Deputy Premier; Secretary for Labour and Industry	Vince Gair
Secretary for Agriculture and Stock	Harold Collins
Secretary for Public Lands; Secretary for Mines (until 17 March 1949); Minister for Irrigation (from 17 March 1949)	Tom Foley
Secretary for Health; Secretary for Home Affairs	Arthur Jones
Attorney-General	David Gledson (until 14 May 1949)
Treasurer	James Larcombe
Secretary for Public Instruction	Harry Bruce
Minister for Transport	Jack Duggan
Secretary for Public Works; Secretary for Housing; Secretary for Local Government	William Power
Secretary for Mines; Secretary for Immigration	Bill Moore (from 17 March 1949)
Attorney-General	George Devries (from 9 June 1949)

== Third ministry ==
On 10 May 1950, following the state election, the Governor, Sir John Lavarack, designated 10 principal executive offices of the Government, appointed Paul Hilton to the Executive Council to fill the vacancy left by Bruce's loss of his parliamentary seat, and appointed the following Members of the Legislative Assembly of Queensland to the Ministry as follows. The ministry lasted until 17 January 1952, at which time the Gair Ministry was sworn in.

Office	Minister
Premier; Chief Secretary	Ned Hanlon (until 15 January 1952)
Deputy Premier; Treasurer	Vince Gair
Secretary for Public Lands and Irrigation	Tom Foley
Secretary for Agriculture and Stock	Harold Collins
Attorney-General	James Larcombe
Secretary for Labour and Industry	Arthur Jones
Minister for Transport	Jack Duggan
Secretary for Mines; Secretary for Immigration	William Power
Secretary for Public Instruction	George Devries
Secretary for Health; Secretary for Home Affairs	Bill Moore
Secretary for Public Works; Secretary for Housing; Secretary for Local Government	Paul Hilton

== Notes ==
Preceded by Cooper Ministry	Hanlon Ministry; 1946–1952	Succeeded by Gair Ministry
