= Nicklin ministry =

Ministry of the Government of Queensland, Australia

The Nicklin Ministry was a ministry of the Government of Queensland and was led by Country Party Premier Frank Nicklin. It succeeded the Gair Ministry on 12 August 1957 following the defeat of both Labor and the QLP at the state election held nine days earlier. It was succeeded by the Pizzey Ministry on 17 January 1968 when Nicklin retired from politics.

== First ministry ==
On 12 August 1957, the Administrator designated 11 principal executive offices of the Government and appointed the following Members of the Legislative Assembly of Queensland to the Ministry as follows.

The list below is ordered by decreasing seniority within the Cabinet, as indicated by the Government Gazette and the Hansard index. Blue entries indicate members of the Liberal Party.

Office	Minister
Premier; Chief Minister	Frank Nicklin
Deputy Premier; Minister for Labour and Industry	Kenneth Morris
Minister for Education	Jack Pizzey, BA, Dip. Ed.
Attorney-General; Minister for Justice	Alan Munro
Treasurer; Minister for Housing	Thomas Hiley
Minister for Development; Minister for Mines; Minister for Main Roads	Ernie Evans
Minister for Public Lands and Irrigation	Adolf Muller
Minister for Health; Minister for Home Affairs	Dr Winston Noble, MBBS
Minister for Agriculture and Stock	Otto Madsen
Minister for Public Works; Minister for Local Government	James Heading, CMG
Minister for Transport	Gordon Chalk

== Second ministry ==
On 9 June 1960, following the 1960 state election, the Ministry was reconstituted. Adolf Muller and James Heading left the ministry, to be replaced by Lloyd Roberts and Alan Fletcher.

Office	Minister
Premier; Chief Minister	Frank Nicklin
Deputy Premier; Minister for Labour and Industry	Kenneth Morris
Minister for Education and Migration	Jack Pizzey, BA, Dip. Ed.
Attorney-General; Minister for Justice	Alan Munro
Treasurer; Minister for Housing	Thomas Hiley
Minister for Development; Minister for Mines; Minister for Main Roads and Electricity	Ernie Evans
Minister for Health; Minister for Home Affairs	Dr Winston Noble, MBBS
Minister for Agriculture and Stock	Otto Madsen
Minister for Transport	Gordon Chalk
Minister for Public Works; Minister for Local Government	Lloyd Roberts
Minister for Public Lands and Irrigation	Alan Fletcher

== Third ministry ==
On 26 September 1963, following the introduction of a bill to increase the ministry from 11 to 13 members, the Ministry was reconstituted with two new ministers, Joh Bjelke-Petersen (Country) and Peter Delamothe (Liberal).

Office	Minister
Premier; Minister for State Development	Frank Nicklin
Deputy Premier; Minister for Industrial Development	Alan Munro
Minister for Education	Jack Pizzey, BA, Dip. Ed.
Treasurer	Thomas Hiley
Minister for Mines; Minister for Main Roads	Ernie Evans
Minister for Health	Dr Winston Noble, MBBS
Minister for Transport	Gordon Chalk
Minister for Public Lands and Irrigation	Alan Fletcher
Minister for Local Government; Minister for Conservation	Harold Richter
Minister for Labour and Industry	Alex Dewar
Minister for Primary Industries	John Row
Minister for Public Works; Minister for Housing	Joh Bjelke-Petersen
Attorney-General; Minister for Justice	Peter Delamothe

Preceded by Gair Ministry	Nicklin Ministry; 1957–1968	Succeeded by Pizzey Ministry
