= Minister for Health (Queensland) =

Government minister in Queensland, Australia

Minister for Health of Queensland

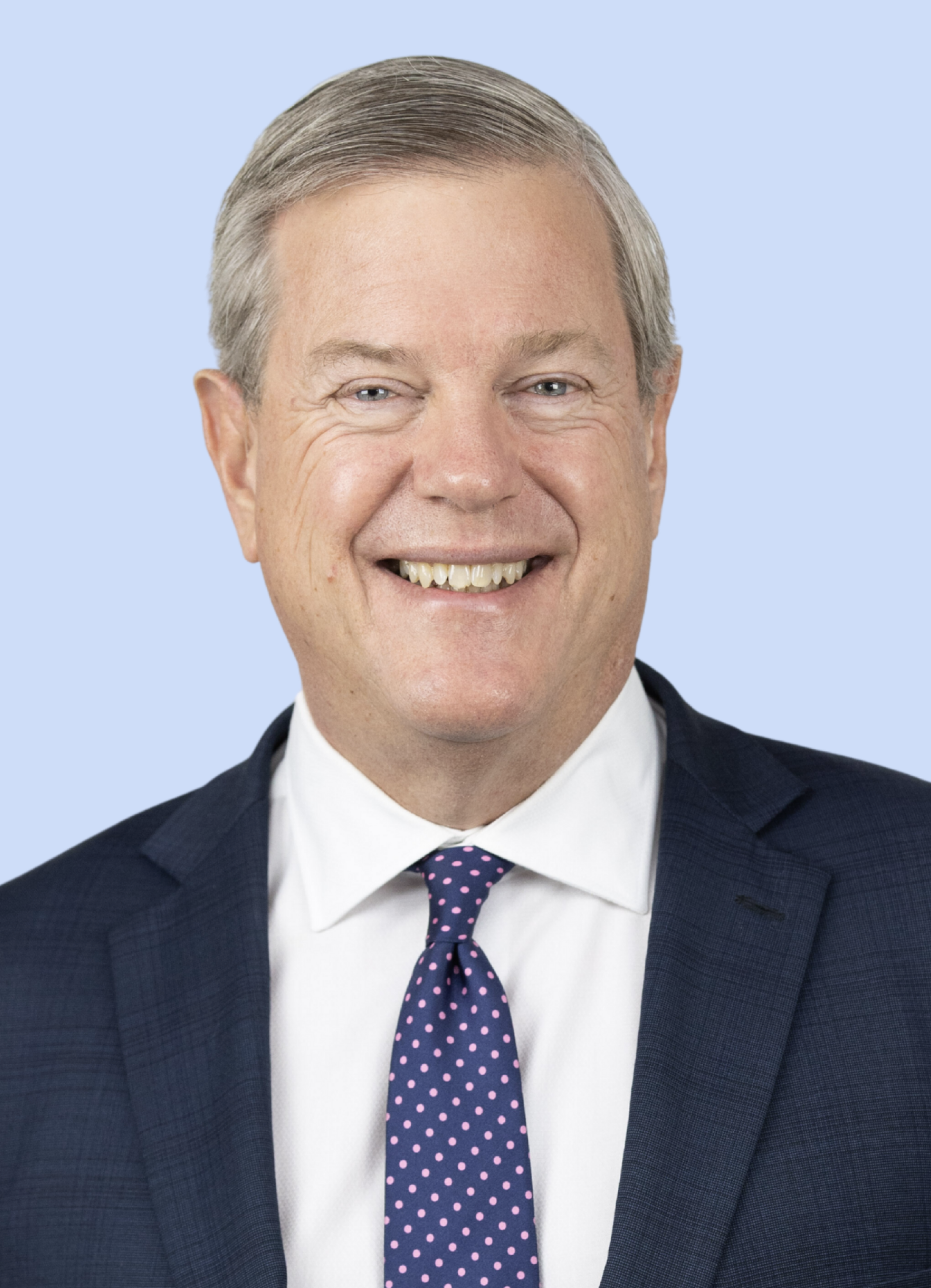
- Incumbent; Tim Nicholls since 1 November 2024
- Queensland Health
- Style: The Honourable
- Nominator: Premier of Queensland
- Appointer: Governor of Queensland
- Inaugural holder: Ned Hanlon (as the Secretary for Health)
- Formation: 5 December 1935

The Queensland Minister for Health is a minister in the Queensland Government who has overall responsibility for Queensland Health and its sixteen Hospital and Health Boards. Through this, the Minister for Health administers the health portfolio which includes hospitals, health services, Aboriginal and Torres Strait Islander health, and the Queensland Ambulance Service.

The current minister is Tim Nicholls, who was sworn in on 1 November 2024 as part of the full Crisafulli ministry following the Liberal National Party's victory at the 2024 Queensland state election.

== List of ministers ==
No.	Minister	Party	Ministry	Title	Term start	Term end	Term in office	Ref.
1	Ned Hanlon	Labor	Forgan Smith (2) (3) (4); Cooper (1)	Secretary for Health	5 December 1935	27 April 1944	8 years, 144 days	
2	Tom Foley	Labor	Cooper (2); Hanlon (1)	Secretary for Health	27 April 1944	15 May 1947	3 years, 18 days	
3	Arthur Jones	Labor	Hanlon (2)	Secretary for Health	15 May 1947	10 May 1950	2 years, 360 days	
4	Bill Moore	Labor	Hanlon (3); Gair (1) (2) (3)	Secretary for Health	10 May 1950	26 April 1957	7 years, 94 days	
4	Bill Moore	Queensland Labor	Hanlon (3); Gair (1) (2) (3)	Secretary for Health	26 April 1957	12 August 1957	7 years, 94 days	
5	Winston Noble	Liberal	Nicklin (1) (2) (3)	Minister for Health	12 August 1957	28 March 1964	6 years, 229 days	
6	Douglas Tooth	Liberal	Pizzey; Chalk; Bjelke-Petersen (1) (2) (3)	Minister for Health	14 April 1964	23 December 1974	10 years, 253 days	
7	Llew Edwards	Liberal	Bjelke-Petersen (4) (5)	Minister for Health	23 December 1974	15 December 1978	3 years, 357 days	
8	William Knox	Liberal	Bjelke-Petersen (5)	Minister for Health	15 December 1978	23 December 1980	2 years, 8 days	
9	Brian Austin	Liberal	Bjelke-Petersen (6)	Minister for Health	23 December 1980	18 August 1983	2 years, 238 days	
10	Angelo Bertoni	National	Bjelke-Petersen (7)	Minister for Health	19 August 1983	7 November 1983	80 days	
(9)	Brian Austin	National	Bjelke-Petersen (8)	Minister for Health	7 November 1983	1 December 1986	3 years, 24 days	
11	Mike Ahern	National	Bjelke-Petersen (9)	Minister for Health	1 December 1986	25 November 1987	359 days	
12	Kev Lingard	National	Bjelke-Petersen (9)	Minister for Health	25 November 1987	1 December 1987	6 days	
13	Leisha Harvey	National	Ahern	Minister for Health	9 December 1987	19 January 1989	1 year, 41 days	
14	Ivan Gibbs	National	Ahern	Minister for Health	19 January 1989	25 September 1989	322 days	
14	Ivan Gibbs	National	Cooper	Minister for Health	25 September 1989	7 December 1989	322 days	
15	Ken McElligott	Labor	Goss (1)	Minister for Health	7 December 1989	10 December 1991	2 years, 3 days	
16	Ken Hayward	Labor	Goss (1)	Minister for Health	16 December 1991	24 September 1992	3 years, 67 days	
16	Ken Hayward	Labor	Goss (2)	Minister for Health	24 September 1992	21 February 1995	3 years, 67 days	
17	Jim Elder	Labor	Goss (2)	Minister for Health	21 February 1995	31 July 1995	160 days	
18	Peter Beattie	Labor	Goss (3)	Minister for Health	31 July 1995	19 February 1996	203 days	
19	Mike Horan	National	Borbidge	Minister for Health	26 February 1996	26 June 1998	2 years, 120 days	
20	Wendy Edmond	Labor	Beattie (1) (2)	Minister for Health	29 June 1998	12 February 2004	5 years, 228 days	
21	Gordon Nuttall	Labor	Beattie (3)	Minister for Health	12 February 2004	28 July 2005	1 year, 166 days	
22	Stephen Robertson	Labor	Beattie (4) (5); Bligh (1)	Minister for Health	28 July 2005	26 March 2009	3 years, 241 days	
23	Paul Lucas	Labor	Bligh (2)	Minister for Health	26 March 2009	21 February 2011	1 year, 332 days	
24	Geoff Wilson	Labor	Bligh (3)	Minister for Health	21 February 2011	26 March 2012	1 year, 34 days	
25	Lawrence Springborg	Liberal National	Newman	Minister for Health	3 April 2012	14 February 2015	2 years, 316 days	
26	Cameron Dick	Labor	Palaszczuk (1)	Minister for Health and Ambulance Services	16 February 2015	11 December 2017	2 years, 298 days	
27	Steven Miles	Labor	Palaszczuk (2)	Minister for Health and Ambulance Services	12 December 2017	11 November 2020	2 years, 335 days	
28	Yvette D'Ath	Labor	Palaszczuk (3)	Minister for Health and Ambulance Services	12 November 2020	17 May 2023	2 years, 186 days	
29	Shannon Fentiman	Labor	Palaszczuk (3); Miles	Minister for Health, Mental Health and Ambulance Services	18 May 2023	28 October 2024	1 year, 163 days	
30	Tim Nicholls	Liberal National	Crisafulli	Minister for Health and Ambulance Services	1 November 2024	Incumbent	1 year, 310 days	
