= Minister for Public Works =

Minister for Public Works may refer to:

- Minister for Public Works (New South Wales)
- Minister for Public Works (Queensland)
- Minister for Public Works (Victoria)
- Minister for Public Works (Western Australia)
- Minister for Public Works of Luxembourg
