= 1950 Queensland state election =

← 1947	29 April 1950	1953 →

All 75 seats in the Legislative Assembly of Queensland 38 Assembly seats were needed for a majority
- Registered: 688,309
- Turnout: 628,750 (91.35%) (Note: The Country Party won the electorates of Cunningham, Darlington, and Landsborough unopposed.) (▲1.76 pp)
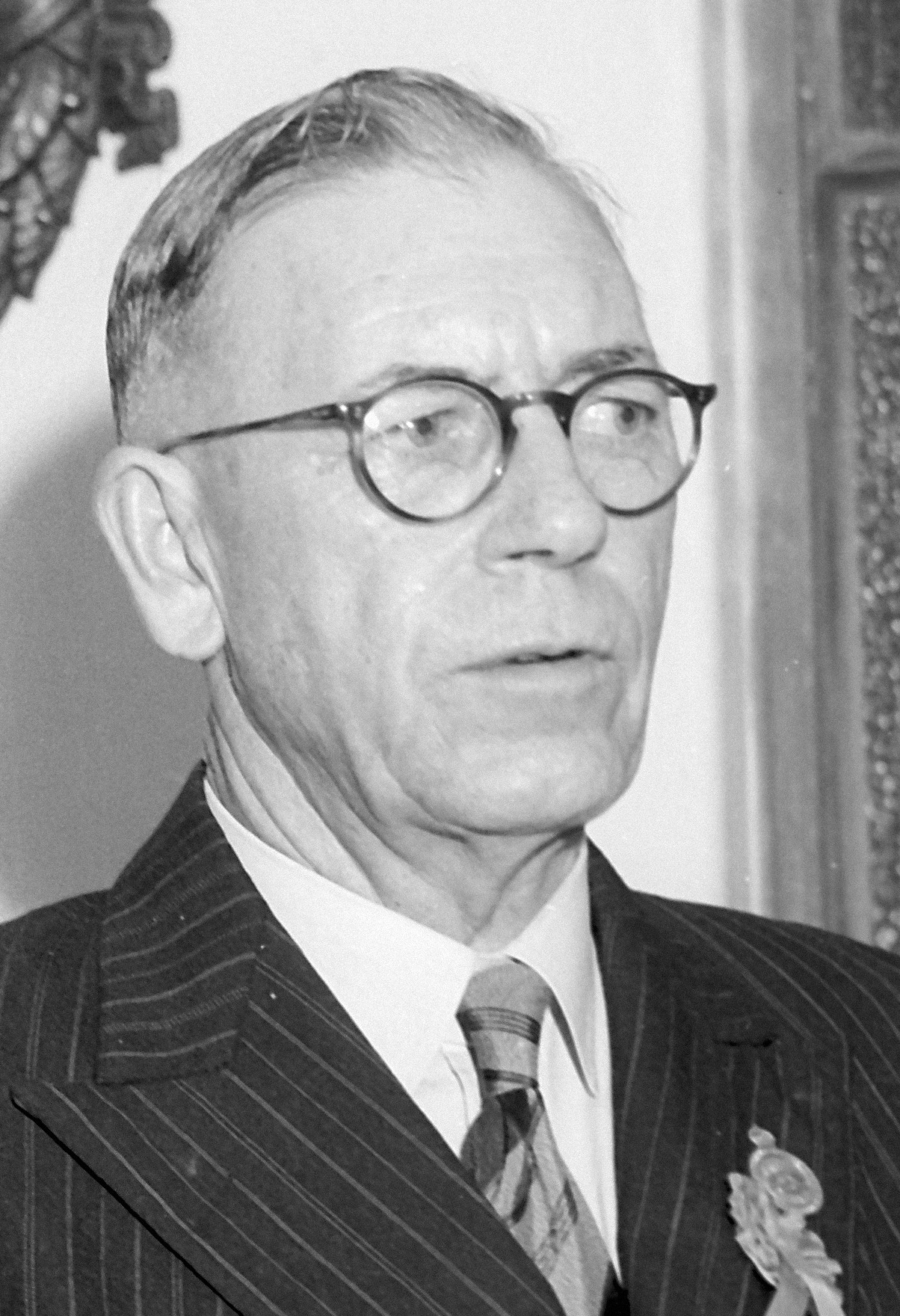

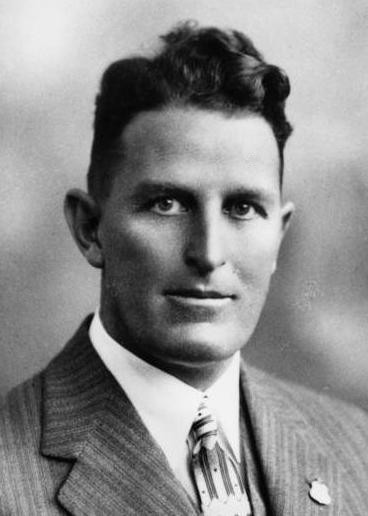

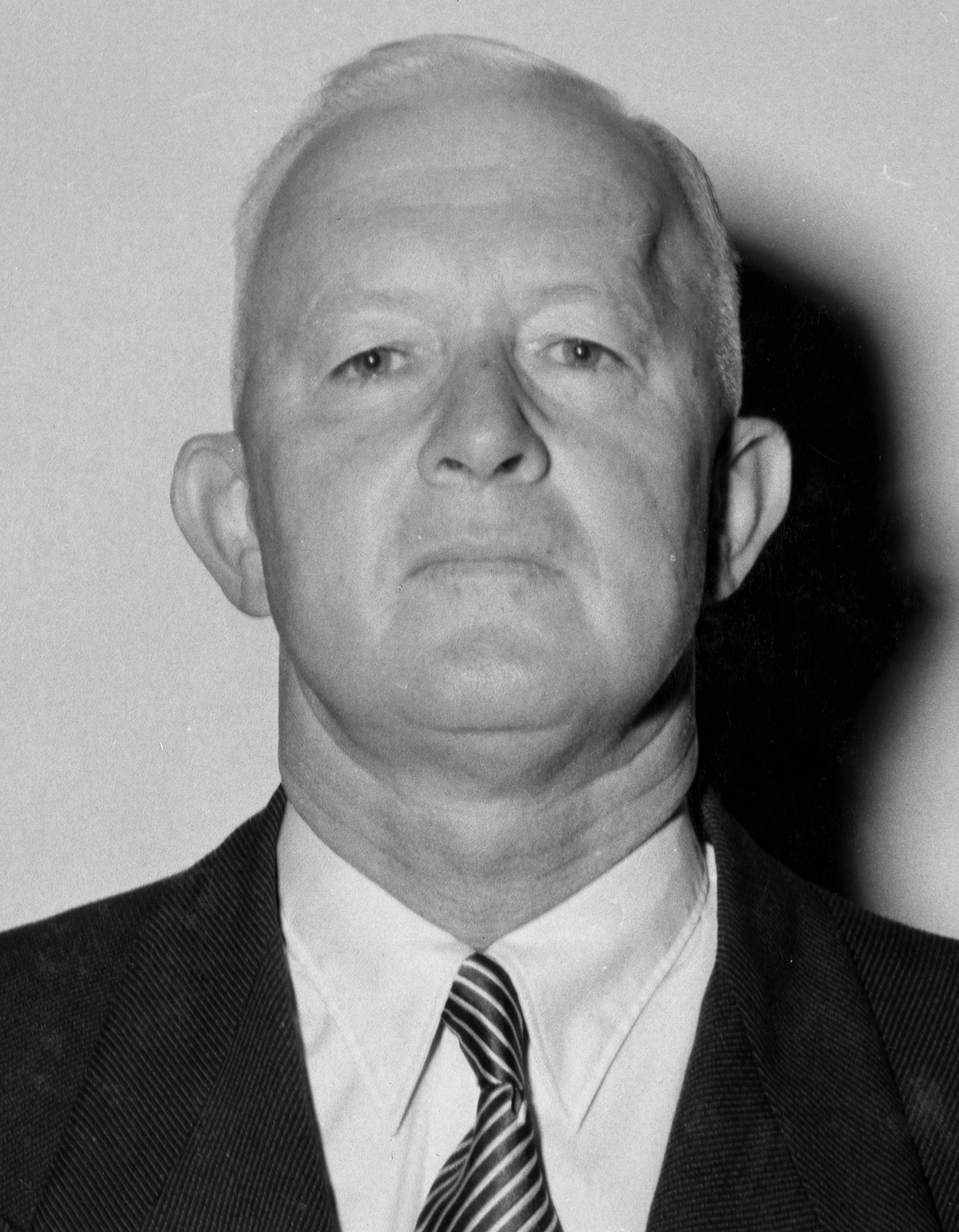

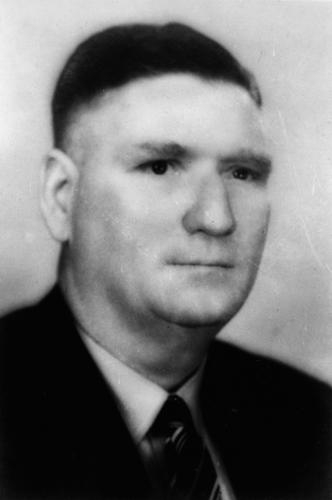
	First party	Second party
Leader	Ned Hanlon	Frank Nicklin
Party	Labor	Country
Leader since	7 March 1946	21 May 1941
Leader's seat	Ithaca	Landsborough
Last election	35 seats, 43.00%	14 seats, 20.40%
Seats won	42	20
Seat change	▲7	▲6
Popular vote	295,138	121,199
Percentage	46.94%	19.28%
Swing	▲3.94	▼1.12
	Third party	Fourth party
Leader	Thomas Hiley	Tom Aikens
Party	Liberal	North Queensland Labor
Leader since	9 July 1949	1942
Leader's seat	Coorparoo (won seat)	Mundingburra
Last election	9 seats, 25.38% (Note: Figures of the People's Party, the precursor to the Liberal Party.)	1 seat, 0.72% (Note: Figures from Hermit Park Labor total.)
Seats won	11	1
Seat change	▲2	Steady
Popular vote	188,331	7,689
Percentage	29.95%	1.22%
Swing	▲0.57	▲0.50
- Electoral boundaries following the election.

Premier before election
Ned Hanlon
Labor
Elected Premier
Ned Hanlon
Labor

Elections were held in the Australian state of Queensland on 29 April 1950 to elect the 75 members of the state's Legislative Assembly. The Labor government was seeking its seventh continuous term in office since the 1932 election; it would be Premier Ned Hanlon's second election.

The Assembly had been increased in size prior to the election by the Electoral Districts Act 1949 from 62 to 75 seats.

== Key dates ==
Date	Event
8 December 1949	The new electoral boundaries under the Electoral Districts Act 1949 were proclaimed.
27 March 1950	The Parliament was dissolved.
27 March 1950	Writs were issued by the Governor to proceed with an election.
3 April 1950	Close of nominations.
29 April 1950	Polling day, between the hours of 8am and 6pm.
10 May 1950	The Hanlon Ministry was re-sworn in.
13 May 1950	Polling day in the seat of Gregory.
9 June 1950	The writ was returned and the results formally declared.
1 August 1950	Parliament resumed for business.

== Results ==
Legislative Assembly (IRV) – Turnout: 91.35%
Party	Primary vote			Seats	
Party	Votes	%	Swing (pp)	Seats	Change
Labor	295,138	46.94	+3.94	42	▲7
Country	121,199	19.28	–1.12	20	▲6
Liberal	188,331	29.95	+0.57	11	▲2
North Queensland Labor	7,689	1.22	+0.5	1	Steady
Frank Barnes Labor	2,759	0.44	–3.01	0	▼1
Communist	2,351	0.37	–0.87	0	▼1
Independent Labor	243	0.04	+0.04	0	Steady
Independent	11,952	1.90	–0.90	1	▲1
Total	628,750	100.00		75	▲13
Invalid/blank votes	7,088	1.13	–0.27	—	
Turnout	628,750	91.35	+0.6	—	
Registered voters	688,309	—		—	

Popular vote
Labor	46.87%
Liberal	29.91%
Country	19.33%
NQ Labor	1.22%
Frank Barnes Labor	0.44%
Communist	0.37%
Independents	1.86%

Seats
Labor	56.00%
Country	26.67%
Liberal	14.67%
NQ Labor	1.33%
Independents	1.33%

^{1} 718,685 electors were enrolled to vote at the election, but 3 seats held by the Country Party representing 30,376 enrolled voters were unopposed.

== Seats changing party representation ==
There was an extensive redistribution across Queensland prior to this election, increasing the amount of seats from 62 to 75. The seat changes are as follows.

=== Abolished seats ===
Seat	Incumbent member	Party
Albert	Tom Plunkett	Country
Bowen	Fred Paterson	Communist
Dalby*	vacant	
East Toowoomba	Gordon Chalk	Liberal
Enoggera	Kenneth Morris	Liberal
Gympie	Thomas Dunstan	Labor
Hamilton	Harold Taylor	Liberal
Herbert	Stephen Theodore	Labor
Kennedy	Cecil Jesson	Labor
Logan	Thomas Hiley	Liberal
Maranoa	John Taylor	Labor
Maree	Louis Luckins	Liberal
Nanango	Joh Bjelke-Petersen	Country
Normanby	Tom Foley	Labor
Oxley	Tom Kerr	Liberal
Stanley	Duncan MacDonald	Country
The Tableland	Harry Bruce	Labor
West Moreton*	vacant	
Wide Bay	James Heading	Country

- Members listed in italics resigned from politics at this election.
- The Country Party member for Dalby, Charles Russell resigned from the seat to contest and win the seat of Maranoa at the 1949 federal election. No by-election was held due to the proximity to the state election.
- The Country Party member for West Moreton, Ted Maher resigned from the seat to contest and win a seat in the Senate at the 1949 federal election. No by-election was held due to the proximity to the state election.

=== New seats ===
Seat	Party	Elected member
Balonne	Labor	John Taylor
Barambah	Country	Joh Bjelke-Petersen
Belyando	Labor	Tom Foley
Burdekin	Independent	Arthur Coburn
Callide	Country	Vince Jones
Chermside	Liberal	Alex Dewar
Clayfield	Liberal	Harold Taylor
Condamine	Country	Eric Allpass
Coorparoo	Liberal	Thomas Hiley
Darlington	Country	Tom Plunkett
Flinders	Labor	Ernest Riordan
Haughton	Labor	Colin McCathie
Hinchinbrook	Labor	Cecil Jesson
Kedron	Liberal	Bruce Pie
Landsborough	Country	Frank Nicklin
Lockyer	Liberal	Gordon Chalk
Mackenzie	Labor	Paddy Whyte
Marodian	Country	James Heading
Mount Coot-tha	Liberal	Kenneth Morris
Mount Gravatt	Labor	Felix Dittmer
Mourilyan	Labor	Peter Byrne
Mulgrave	Country	Bob Watson
Nash	Labor	Thomas Dunstan
Norman	Liberal	Louis Luckins
North Toowoomba	Labor	Les Wood
Roma	Country	William Ewan
Sherwood	Liberal	Tom Kerr
Somerset	Country	Duncan MacDonald
Southport	Country	Eric Gaven
Tablelands	Labor	Harold Collins
Whitsunday	Country	Lloyd Roberts
Yeronga	Liberal	Winston Noble

=== Seats changing hands ===
Seat	Incumbent member	Party	New member	Party
Bulimba	George Marriott	Independent Labor	Bob Gardner	Labor
Bundaberg	Frank Barnes	Frank Barnes Labor	Ted Walsh	Labor
Cook	Harold Collins	Labor	Carlisle Wordsworth	Country
Windsor	Bruce Pie	Liberal	Tom Rasey	Labor

- Members listed in italics did not recontest their seats.

== See also ==
- Members of the Queensland Legislative Assembly, 1947–1950
- Members of the Queensland Legislative Assembly, 1950–1953
- Candidates of the Queensland state election, 1950
- Hanlon Ministry
