= Max Julius =

Australian barrister (1916–1963)

- Born: Max Nordau Julius; 9 March 1916; South Brisbane, Australia
- Died: 27 February 1963 (aged 46)
- Education: University of Queensland
- Occupation: Barrister
- Known for: Co-founder of the Eureka Youth League
- Political party: Communist Party of Australia

Max Nordau Julius (9 March 1916 – 27 February 1963) was an Australian barrister and communist.

Born in South Brisbane to Hungarian tailor Julius Isack (known as Isack Julius) and his Romanian-born wife Ernestina, née Lang, he was raised a non-orthodox Jew and attended Leichhardt Street State School, winning a scholarship to Brisbane Grammar School in 1929. He attended the University of Queensland from 1934, gaining a Bachelor of Arts in 1938 and a Bachelor of Law in 1940. He was secretary of the Radical Club from 1937 to 1938 and edited the Student Union's paper, Semper Floreat, in 1938. He joined the Communist Party of Australia in 1936.

Julius was involved in socialist theatrical productions in the 1930s and he co-founded the Eureka Youth League in 1940 with Connie Healy. In 1941 his application to join the Queensland Bar was blocked due to his communism; he took the matter to court with Fred Paterson as his counsel. The judge found in his favour and he was admitted to the bar on 29 June. He was nevertheless shunned by much of the legal community but stayed solvent by charging a token fee. He married Kate Doreen Gillham on 22 October 1943 at Brisbane (they divorced in 1962).

In 1948 Julius was sentenced to three months' gaol for not paying fines resulting from his involvement in the St Patrick's Day march, but he was released after two weeks when widespread sympathy led an anonymous donor (rumoured to be the Hanlon Labor government) to pay his fine. He was a frequent candidate for elections, and it was his preferences that decided the seat of Moreton in the 1961 federal election in favour of the Liberal James Killen, allowing Robert Menzies to retain government.

Julius was involved in the legal case regarding Menzies' attempted dissolution of the Communist Party in 1950–51, and in 1954–55 he cross-examined the Petrovs at the royal commission on espionage. He was also a supporter of the peace movement and Aboriginal rights. On 16 February 1960, under financial difficulties, he had himself removed from the roll of barristers and became a solicitor. Julius died at Princess Alexandra Hospital in South Brisbane on 27 February 1963 of myocardial infarction and was cremated.
