= Frank Eastaughffe =

Australian politician (1903–1976)

Francis Eric Eastaughffe (pronounced EAST-off) (18 August 1903 – 18 October 1976) was a long-serving politician in Childers, Queensland, Australia.

== Early life ==
He was born on the outskirts of the town as the youngest of 17 children (two of whom died at birth). After his marriage to Mary (Molly) Carrigg in 1928, they settled on his father's 3,500-acre (14 km^{2}) property called Retreat, (later renamed Gigoom when it became a rural post office), about ten miles (16 km) from Childers. Frank, by then a butcher, ran the farm with beef and dairy cattle. He later worked at the local sugar mill as an engineer and was the Australian Workers' Union representative.

== Politics ==
He had a long-term interest in politics and served for 35 years on the Isis Shire council for eleven terms from 1936 until 1970. He was shire chairman (a position comparable to mayor) for seven terms, from 1949 till 1970, making him the longest serving chairman of the Isis Shire. He lost the 1970 election to Alf Plath, and retired from politics.

In 1953, he was awarded the Coronation Medal for services to local authority, and in 1959 he hosted a civic reception for Princess Alexandra of Kent on her royal tour of Australia.

He attempted to enter the Legislative Assembly of Queensland at various elections on behalf of the Labor Party but was unsuccessful, and he remained in local politics until 1970.

== Later life ==
He died of leukaemia in Childers Hospital on 18 October 1976.

Frank Eastaughffe was a grandson of Charles Douglas Eastaughffe, former chief constable of Dalby, and a son of Alexander Eastaughffe, a previous Isis Shire chairman.
