= George Marriott =

Australian politician

Member of the Queensland Legislative Assembly for Bulimba
- In office 2 April 1938 – 29 April 1950
- Preceded by: William Copley
- Succeeded by: Robert Gardner

Personal details
- Born: George Henry Marriott; 5 September 1886 Brooyar, Queensland, Australia
- Died: 24 September 1964 (aged 78) Chermside, Queensland, Australia
- Party: Independent Labor
- Other political affiliations: Labor Party
- Spouse: Annie Julia Olufson (m.1910 d.1960)
- Occupation: Power station worker

George Henry Marriott (5 September 1886 – 24 September 1964) was a member of the Queensland Legislative Assembly.

== Biography ==
Marriott was born in Brooyar, Queensland, the son of George Henry Marriott Snr and his wife Helen (née McKay). He received his education at Kholo State School and subsequently worked at the Brisbane City Council power station after completing his education.

On 23 July 1910, he married Annie Julia Olufson (died 1960) with whom he had four daughters. Marriott died in September 1964 at Chermside and was cremated at the Mt Thompson Crematorium.

== Public career ==
Marriott, a member of the Labor Party, was a representative on the Brisbane Trades and Labour Council, a secretary on the Brisbane sub-branch of the Federated Engine Drivers and Firemen's Association, and a councillor on the Balmoral Shire Council before entering state politics. He unsuccessfully stood for the seat of Bulimba at the 1920 before winning the seat 18 years later at the 1938 Queensland state election.

In November 1941, Marriott, along with George Taylor, the member for Enoggera, was expelled from the Labor Party when he was told "he had left the party" for supporting the Australian-Russian Association and joining in a campaign to supply sheepskins to Russia. He continued on in parliament as an independent Labor member until his defeat by official Labor candidate Robert Gardner at the 1950 state election.

Marriott was a member of the Bulimba Kindergarten Committee, the Church of England Diocesan Synod, and the Freemasons.

Parliament of Queensland
Preceded by William Copley	Member for Bulimba; 1938–1950	Succeeded by Robert Gardner
