= John Herbert (Queensland politician) =

Australian politician

The Honourable John Herbert

Member of the Queensland Legislative Assembly for Sherwood
- In office 19 May 1956 – 13 September 1978
- Preceded by: Thomas Caldwell Kerr
- Succeeded by: Angus Innes

Personal details
- Born: John Desmond Herbert; 11 February 1925 Brisbane, Queensland, Australia
- Died: 30 October 1978 (aged 53) Hopetoun Private Hospital, Queensland, Australia
- Party: Liberal Party
- Spouse: Yvonne May Cranston (m. 1948)
- Relations: John Henry Prowse (grandfather); Joan Cribb (sister)
- Children: Five
- Parent: Desmond Herbert
- Education: Brisbane Grammar School
- Alma mater: University of Queensland
- Occupation: Bank clerk

Military service
- Allegiance: Australia
- Branch/service: Royal Australian Navy
- Years of service: 1942–1946
- Rank: Able Seaman

John Desmond Herbert (11 February 1925 – 30 October 1978) was an Australian politician, who was the Liberal Party member for the electoral district of Sherwood in the Queensland Legislative Assembly from 1956 to 1978.

Herbert was born in Brisbane, to botanist Desmond Herbert and his wife, Vera Prowse (the daughter of John Henry Prowse, a federal politician from Western Australia). His sister Joan would also become a botanist like their father.

In 1943, Herbert enlisted in the Royal Australian Navy where he served in the Indian Ocean, Burma, New Guinea, and the Admiralty Islands until his discharge from the naval base HMAS Moreton in March 1946. He then worked as a bank clerk for the English, Scottish and Australian Bank (ES&A), and was involved in the anti-bank nationalisation campaign of 1947.

He was a member of the Liberal Party, and was a member of the party's state executive from 1950 until 1956 when he successfully ran for election in the electoral district of Sherwood. He served in various ministerial positions from 1965 to 1978, holding the portfolios of labour, tourism, sport and welfare services.

Herbert resigned due to ill health in September 1978, and died several weeks later at Hopetoun Private Hospital on 30 October. A state funeral was held for him on 2 November, with the Premier of Queensland, Joh Bjelke-Petersen, as one of his pall bearers.

The John Herbert Memorial Award, part of the Queensland Heritage Awards, is granted each year for the state's most outstanding heritage project. Prior to 2004, the Queensland Heritage Awards themselves had been known as the John Herbert Memorial Awards. A 1946 extension of the Sherwood Arboretum was later renamed the John Herbert Memorial Vista in his honour, and is listed on the Queensland Heritage Register along with the main site. John Herbert was also patron of the Oxley Golf Club and Jindalee Golf Club, both of which were located in his electorate. The clubs contest annually for the John Herbert Shield named in his honour to recognise his contribution to the development of both clubs.

Parliament of Queensland
Preceded by Thomas Caldwell Kerr	Member for Sherwood; 1956–1978	Succeeded by Angus Innes
