= Tom Kerr (politician) =

Australian politician

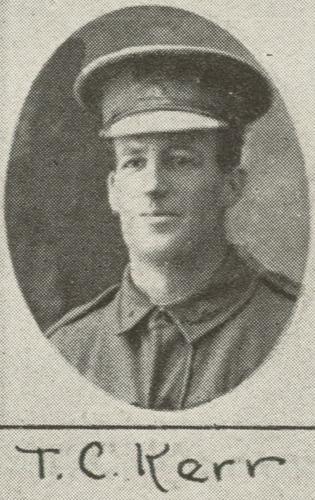
- T.C. Kerr photographed in The Queenslander Pictorial supplement to The Queenslander, 1917

Member of the Queensland Legislative Assembly for Oxley
- In office 17 April 1943 – 29 April 1950
- Preceded by: Thomas Nimmo
- Succeeded by: Seat abolished

Member of the Queensland Legislative Assembly for Sherwood
- In office 29 April 1950 – 19 May 1956
- Preceded by: New seat
- Succeeded by: John Herbert

Personal details
- Born: Thomas Caldwell Kerr; 15 August 1887 Stanthorpe, Queensland, Australia
- Died: 25 June 1956 (aged 68) Brisbane, Queensland, Australia
- Party: Liberal Party
- Other political affiliations: UAP, QPP
- Spouse: Lillian Berry (m.1919 d.1954)
- Occupation: Accountant

Thomas Caldwell Kerr (15 August 1887 – 25 June 1956) was a member of the Queensland Legislative Assembly.

== Biography ==
Kerr was born at Stanthorpe, Queensland, the son of John Kerr and his wife Mary (née Caldwell). He was educated at Sherwood State School and from 1905 to 1915 he was a pearl sheller in the Dutch East Indies and Thursday Island. Later on he served as a public accountant and auditor with Wright, Kerr and Co. in Brisbane.

He also served in the First Australian Imperial Force in World War I, being based with the 31st Infantry Battalion.

On 8 November 1919, he married Lillian Violet Berry (died 1954) in Brisbane and together had two sons and one daughter. One of their sons died in World War II while serving as a Spitfire Pilot in France. Kerr died in June 1956 and was cremated at Mt Thompson Crematorium.His ashes are in the columbarium wall at St Matthew's Anglican Church, Sherwood.

== Public life ==
Kerr, a member of the UAP, and later the QPP and the Liberal Party, won the seat of Oxley in the Queensland Legislative Assembly in the 1943 by-election to replace Thomas Nimmo who had died in February of that year. He was to represent the seat until it was abolished before the 1950 state election.

He then moved to the new seat of Sherwood, holding it for six years until he retired from politics in 1956. He collapsed and died a month later in his Queen Street office.

Parliament of Queensland
Preceded by Thomas Nimmo	Member for Oxley; 1943–1950	Abolished
New seat	Member for Sherwood; 1950–1956	Succeeded by John Herbert
