= Bob Gardner (Queensland politician) =

Australian politician

Member of the Queensland Legislative Assembly for Bulimba
- In office 29 Apr 1950 – 18 Jan 1951
- Preceded by: George Marriott
- Succeeded by: Himself
- In office 14 Apr 1951 – 3 Aug 1957
- Preceded by: Himself
- Succeeded by: Jack Houston

Personal details
- Born: Robert James Gardner; 1 April 1890 Brisbane, Queensland, Australia
- Died: 12 November 1966 (aged 76) Brisbane, Queensland, Australia
- Resting place: Hemmant Cemetery
- Party: QLP
- Other political affiliations: Labor
- Spouse: Annie Campbell (m.1913 d.1986)
- Occupation: Painter

Robert James Gardner (1 April 1890 – 12 November 1966) was a member of the Queensland Legislative Assembly.

== Biography ==
Gardner was born in Brisbane, Queensland, the son of William Gardner and his wife Mary Jane (née Murphy). He was educated at the local primary school and after finishing his education became a storekeeper. From 1928 until 1950 he worked as a painter for the State Works Department of Queensland

On 9 April 1913 he married Annie Campbell (died 1986) and together had two sons and four daughters. Gardner died in Brisbane in November 1966 and was buried in the Hemmant Cemetery.

== Public career ==
Gardner, a member of the Labor Party, won the seat of Bulimba at the 1950 Queensland state election, beating the sitting Independent Labor member, George Marriott and the Liberal Party candidate, John Hamilton. However, Hamilton appealed the decision and the Acting Chief Justice, Alan Mansfield found that there gross fraud committed in the election. Fake ballot papers had been lodged, and whilst Mansfield did not put any of the blame on Gardner, he ruled the Gardner's election win to be void.

A by-election was held in April 1951, and once again Gardner won the seat. Two days after the by-election, Bernard Maguire, the Chief Electoral Officer, was charged with eight counts of having forged ballot papers. In September 1951 though, the Crown dropped the case after a jury failed three times to reach a verdict and Maguire was then discharged.

Gardner went on to hold the seat until the 1957 Queensland state election, having sided with Premier Vince Gair to join the newly formed QLP after the ALP had split two months earlier. He was defeated by future Opposition leader, Jack Houston of the ALP. He was a member of the Bulimba Hockey Association, the Australian Natives Association, and Valleys Rugby League Old Boys Association.

Parliament of Queensland
Preceded by George Marriott	Member for Bulimba; 1950–1951	Succeeded by Himself
Preceded by Himself	Member for Bulimba; 1951–1957	Succeeded by Jack Houston
