= Minister for Public Works (Queensland) =

The list of ministers for the Department of Public Works in the Government of Queensland, Australia, include:

Minister	Term start	Term end	Title	Party	Notes
St. George Richard Gore	14 January 1862	21 March 1862	Secretary for Public Lands and Works		
Arthur Macalister	21 March 1862	1 February 1866	Secretary for Lands and Public Works		
Arthur Macalister	1 February 1866	20 July 1866	Premier and Secretary for Lands and Works		
John Watts	21 July 1866	7 August 1866	Secretary for Lands and Public Works		
John Watts	7 August 1866	3 May 1867	Secretary for Public Works		
John Douglas	21 May 1867	18 August 1867	Secretary for Public Works		
Arthur Hunter Palmer	15 August 1867	10 September 1868	Secretary for Public Works		
Arthur Hodgson	10 September 1868	25 November 1868	Secretary for Public Works		
Arthur Macalister	25 November 1868	28 January 1869	Secretary for Lands and Public Work		
Arthur Macalister	28 January 1869	3 May 1870	Secretary for Public Works and Gold Field		
William Henry Walsh	3 May 1870	10 July 1873	Secretary for Public Works		
Arthur Hunter Palmer	10 July 1873	15 July 1873	Secretary for Public Works		
John Malbon Thompson	15 July 1873	8 January 1874	Secretary for Public Works		
Thomas McIlwraith	8 January 1874	24 October 1874	Secretary for Public Works and Mines	Ministerialist	
Arthur Macalister	24 October 1874	13 November 1874	Secretary for Public Works and Mines		
Henry Edward King	13 November 1874	10 May 1876	Secretary for Public Works and Mines		
James Dickson	10 May 1876	5 June 1876	Secretary for Public Works and Mines	see article	
George Thorn	5 June 1876	8 March 1877	Premier, Postmaster-General and Secretary for Public Works and Mines		
George Thorn	8 March 1877	7 November 1877	Secretary for Public Works		
William Miles	7 November 1877	21 September 1878	Secretary for Public Works		
Samuel Griffith	21 September 1878	21 January 1879	Secretary for Public Works		
John Macrossan	21 January 1879	13 March 1883	Secretary for Public Works and Mines		
Albert Norton	13 March 1883	13 November 1883	Secretary for Public Works and Mines		
William Miles	13 November 1883	22 August 1887	Secretary for Public Works and Mines		
Charles Dutton	30 August 1887	12 December 1887	Secretary for Public Works and Mines		
William Hodgkinson	19 May 1888	13 May 1893	Secretary for Mines and Work		
John Macrossan	13 June 1888	4 January 1890	Secretary for Public Works and Mines		
Hugh Nelson	4 January 1890	12 August 1890	Secretary for Railways and Public Works	Ministerialist	
Horace Tozer	12 August 1890	27 March 1893	Colonial Secretary and Secretary for Public Works	Ministerialist	
Isidor Lissner	27 March 1893	25 May 1893	Secretary for Mines and Public Works	Ministerialist	
Robert Philp	25 May 1893	23 August 1894	Secretary for Mines and Public Works	see article	
Robert Philp	23 August 1894	29 March 1895	Secretary for Mines, Public Works and Public Instruction		
Robert Philp	29 March 1895	6 May 1896	Secretary for Public Works and Railways		
David Dalrymple	6 May 1896	27 April 1898	Secretary for Public Works	Ministerialist	
John Murray	27 April 1898	1 December 1899	Secretary for Railways and Public Works		
John Murray	7 December 1899	1 February 1901	Secretary for Railways and Public Works		
David Dalrymple	28 March 1899	1 December 1899	Secretary for Public Works	Ministerialist	
Andrew Fisher	1 December 1899	7 December 1899	Secretary for Railways and Public Works	Labor	
John Leahy	1 February 1901	17 September 1903	Secretary for Railways and Public Works	see article	
William Browne	17 September 1903	12 April 1904	Secretary for Mines and Public Works	Labor	
Peter Airey	19 April 1904	27 April 1904	Secretary for Mines and Public Works	Labor	
Digby Denham	27 April 1904	19 January 1906	Secretary for Public Works	Ministerialist	
Thomas O'Sullivan	19 January 1906	6 February 1907	Secretary for Public Works	see article	
Thomas O'Sullivan	6 February 1907	19 November 1907	Secretary for Public Works and Agriculture	Kidstonite	
Patrick Leahy	19 November 1907	18 February 1908	Secretary for Public Works and Mines	Conservative/Philpite	
George Kerr	18 February 1908	29 October 1908	Secretary for Railways and Public Works	Kidstonite	
John Appel	29 October 1908	29 June 1909	Secretary for Mines and Public Works	Liberal	
George Jackson	29 June 1909	22 October 1909	Secretary for Mines and Public Works	Liberal	
Walter Barnes	22 October 1909	7 February 1911	Secretary for Public Instruction and for Public Works	Liberal	
Walter Barnes	7 February 1911	1 June 1915	Treasurer and Secretary for Public Works	Liberal	
Ted Theodore	1 June 1915	22 October 1919	Treasurer & Secretary for Public Works	Labor	
James Larcombe	22 October 1919	7 April 1920	Secretary for Public Works	Labor	
John Fihelly	7 April 1920	8 February 1922	Secretary for Public Works	Labor	
Ted Thedore	8 February 1922	6 October 1922	Premier and Chief Secretary, Treasurer, Secretary for Public Works	Labor	
William Forgan Smith	6 October 1922	26 February 1925	Secretary for Public Works	Labor	
Mick Kirwan	26 February 1925	21 May 1929	Secretary for Public Works	Labor	
Reginald King	21 May 1929	17 June 1932	Secretary for Public Works and Public Instruction	CPNP	
Harry Bruce	17 June 1932	15 May 1947	Secretary for Public Works	Labor	
William Power	15 May 1947	10 May 1950	Secretary for Public Works, Housing and Local Government	Labor	
Paul Hilton	10 May 1950	1 May 1952	Secretary for Public Works, Housing and Local Government	Labor	
Paul Hilton	1 May 1952	28 May 1956	Secretary for Public Works and Housing	Labor	
Colin McCathie	28 May 1956	12 August 1957	Secretary for Public Works, Housing and Immigration	Labor/QLP	
James Heading	12 August 1957	9 June 1960	Minister for Public Works and Local Government and Immigration	Country	
Lloyd Roberts	9 June 1960	11 April 1961	Minister for Public Works and Local Government	Country	Died in office
Harold Richter	4 May 1961	26 September 1963	Minister for Public Works and Local Government	Country	
Joh Bjelke-Petersen	26 September 1963	8 August 1968	Minister for Works and Housing	Country	
Max Hodges	8 August 1968	23 December 1974	Minister for Works and Housing	Country	
Max Hodges	23 December 1974	10 March 1975	Minister for Works and Housing and Minister for Police	National	
Norm Lee	10 March 1975	16 December 1977	Minister for Works and Housing	Liberal	
Claude Wharton	16 December 1977	18 October 1986	Minister for Works and Housing	National	
Ivan Gibbs	1 December 1986	25 November 1987	Minister for Works and Housing	National	
Ivan Gibbs	25 November 1987	1 December 1987	Minister for Works, Housing and Industry	National	
Bill Gunn	9 December 1987	19 January 1989	Deputy Premier, Minister for Public Works, Main Roads and Expo and Minister for Police	National	
Bill Gunn	19 January 1989	25 September 1989	Deputy Premier, Minister for Public Works, Housing and Main Roads	National	
Jim Randell	25 September 1989	7 December 1989	Minister for Works and Housing	National	
Ron McLean	7 December 1989	19 September 1992	Minister for Administrative Services	Labor	
Tom Burns	24 September 1992	18 October 1993	Minister for Administrative Services	Labor	
Glen Milliner	18 October 1993	19 February 1996	Minister for Administrative Services	Labor	
Ray Connor	26 February 1996	28 April 1997	Minister for Public Works and Housing	Liberal	
David Watson	28 April 1997	26 June 1998	Minister for Public Works and Housing	Liberal	
Robert Schwarten	29 June 1998	12 February 2004	Minister for Public Works and Housing	Labor	
Robert Schwarten	12 February 2004	13 September 2006	Minister for Public Works, Housing and Racing	Labor	
Robert Schwarten	13 September 2006	12 October 2006	Minister for Public Works and Housing	Labor	
Robert Schwarten	12 October 2006	21 February 2011	Minister for Public Works, Information and Communications Technology	Labor	
Simon Finn	21 February 2011	26 March 2012	Minister for Government Services, Building Industry and Information and Communication Technology	Labor	
Bruce Flegg	3 April 2012	14 November 2012	Minister for Housing and Public Works	LNP	
Tim Mander	19 November 2012	13 February 2015	Minister for Housing and Public Works	LNP	
Leeanne Enoch	16 February 2015	8 December 2015	Minister for Housing and Public Works	Labor	
Mick de Brenni	8 December 2015	18 December 2023	Minister for Public Works and Procurement	Labor	
Meaghan Scanlon	18 December 2023	1 Nov 2024	Minister for Public Works	Labor	
Sam O'Connor	1 Nov 2024		Minister for Housing and Public Works	LNP	

== Other roles ==
Other politicians occupying important roles in the area of public works include:

Minister	Term start	Term end	Title	Party	Notes
Sandy McPhie	20 April 1989	19 October 1989	Chairman, Public Works Committee	National	
Tony McGrady	6 March 1990	16 December 1991	Chairman, Public Works Committee	Labor	
Robert Schwarten	18 March 1992	25 August 1992	Chairman, Public Works Committee	Labor	
Judy Spence	10 November 1992	20 June 1995	Chair, Public Works Committee	Labor	
Bill D'Arcy	15 September 1995	2 April 1996	Chairman, Public Works Committee	Labor	
Len Stephan	2 April 1996	19 May 1998	Chairman, Public Works Committee	National	
Neil Roberts	30 July 1998	17 February 2001	Chairman, Public Works Committee	Labor	
Don Livingstone	3 May 2001	15 August 2006	Chair, Public Works Committee	Labor	
Pat Purcell	12 February 2004	28 July 2005	Parliamentary Secretary to the Minister for Public Works, Housing and Racing	Labor	
Barbara Stone	11 October 2006	20 March 2009	Chair, Public Works Committee	Labor	
Wayne Wendt	23 April 2009	28 May 2009	Chair, Public Works Committee	Labor	
Wayne Wendt	28 May 2009	16 June 2011	Chair, Public Accounts and Public Works Committee	Labor	
