= Electoral district of Marodian =

Former state electoral district of Queensland, Australia

Marodian Queensland—Legislative Assembly
- State: Queensland
- Created: 1950
- Abolished: 1960
- Demographic: Eastern Rural
- Coordinates: 25°55′S 151°50′E

The electoral district of Marodian was a Legislative Assembly electorate in the state of Queensland. It was first created in a redistribution ahead of the 1950 state election, and existed until the 1960 state election.

Marodian was centred on Gayndah and Goomeri, and incorporated parts of the former Isis and Wide Bay electorates. It was named for Marodian Station, situated between Kilkivan and Brooweena. It replaced the Wide Bay electorate due to confusion between the previous state seat and the federal Division of Wide Bay.

In 1960 Marodian was abolished, it was redistributed between the Barambah, Burnett and Isis electorates.

== Members for Marodian ==
The member for Marodian was:

Member	Party	Term
James Heading	Country	1950–1960

== See also ==
- Electoral districts of Queensland
- Members of the Queensland Legislative Assembly by year
- Category:Members of the Queensland Legislative Assembly by name
