= Electoral district of Coorparoo =

Coorparoo Queensland—Legislative Assembly
- State: Queensland
- Created: 1950
- Abolished: 1960
- Demographic: Rural

Coorparoo was a Legislative Assembly electorate in the state of Queensland, Australia.

== History ==
Coorparoo was created by the Electoral Districts Act of 1949, taking effect at the 1950 elections. It was based on the former electorates of Logan and Maree.

Coorparoo was abolished at the 1960 elections, most of its area being incorporated into the new Electoral district of Chatsworth.

== Members ==
The following people were elected in the seat of Coorparoo:

Member	Party	Term
Thomas Hiley	Liberal	1950–1960

== See also ==
- Electoral districts of Queensland
- Members of the Queensland Legislative Assembly by year
- Category:Members of the Queensland Legislative Assembly by name
