= Paul Hilton (politician) =

Australian politician

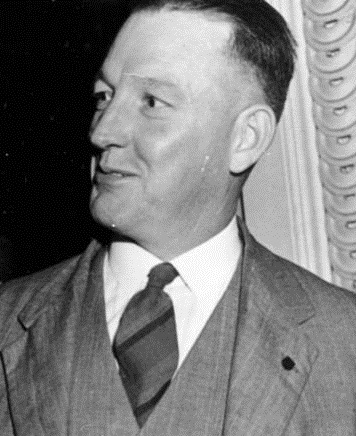
- Hilton, 1944

Member of the Queensland Legislative Assembly for Carnarvon
- In office 11 May 1935 – 1 June 1963
- Preceded by: Edward Costello
- Succeeded by: Henry McKechnie

Personal details
- Born: 1 October 1899 Goomburra, Queensland, Australia
- Died: 18 August 1965 (aged 65) Tarragindi, Queensland
- Resting place: Nudgee Cemetery
- Party: Queensland Labor Party
- Other political affiliations: Labor
- Spouse: Esther Mary Clifford
- Occupation: Clerk

Paul Jerome Remigius Hilton (1 October 1899 – 18 August 1965) was an Australian politician, and a member of the Legislative Assembly of Queensland from 1935 until 1963 representing the seat of Carnarvon, and a minister in both the Hanlon and Gair Ministries.

== Biography ==
Hilton was born to Richard Hilton, a school teacher, and his wife Agnes (née Quirke). He was educated at the state school in Allora and in 1915 got a job as a pay clerk for Queensland Railways, moving to Toowoomba and ultimately Stanthorpe by 1921. He served as an NCO in the militia but was rejected for overseas service for World War I. In 1922, he married Esther Mary Clifford in the town of Gatton; they were to have two sons and two daughters. He became involved with many public bodies in Stanthorpe at this time.

Hilton first ran for the seat of Carnarvon (which was centred on Stanthorpe) at the 1932 election before winning it at the 1935 election. He became a supporter of the Industrial Groups and the Catholic Social Studies Movement organised by B. A. Santamaria, as well as being a member of the Order of St. Francis. He also supported the Society of Saint Vincent de Paul and was the organiser of the Queensland Cancer Research Fund.

On 10 May 1950 he was appointed to the Hanlon Ministry, serving as Secretary for Public Works, Housing and Local Government. The portfolio of Local Government was abolished on 1 May 1952, and he otherwise served in these roles until the 1956 election. He then became Secretary of Lands and Irrigation, relinquishing his old portfolios to Colin McCathie.

On 26 April 1957, Hilton along with Premier Vince Gair and most of the rest of the Ministry were expelled from the Australian Labor Party, and joined the new Queensland Labor Party with which they contested the 1957 election. Hilton won under this banner at the 1957 and 1960 elections, and led the QLP for his final term before losing to Henry McKechnie of the Country Party at the 1963 election.

He retired to Esther Street, Ekibin (part of modern-day Tarragindi) in Brisbane's inner southern suburbs, and died there on 18 August 1965. He was accorded a State funeral and as a catholic buried in Nudgee Cemetery.

Parliament of Queensland
Preceded by Edward Costello	Member for Carnarvon; 1935–1963	Succeeded by Henry McKechnie
