= Ted Walsh (politician) =

Australian politician

The Honourable Ted Walsh
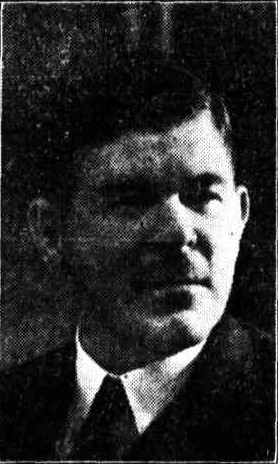
- Walsh in 1944

13th Deputy Premier of Queensland
- In office 7 March 1946 – 15 May 1947
- Premier: Ned Hanlon
- Preceded by: Ned Hanlon
- Succeeded by: Vince Gair
- In office 7 June 1957 – 12 August 1957
- Premier: Vince Gair
- Preceded by: Jack Duggan
- Succeeded by: Kenneth Morris

Treasurer of Queensland
- In office 17 January 1952 – 12 Aug 1957
- Preceded by: Vince Gair
- Succeeded by: Thomas Hiley

Member of the Queensland Legislative Assembly for Mirani
- In office 11 May 1935 – 3 May 1947
- Preceded by: Edward Swayne
- Succeeded by: Ernie Evans

Member of the Queensland Legislative Assembly for Bundaberg
- In office 29 April 1950 – 17 May 1969
- Preceded by: Frank Barnes
- Succeeded by: Lou Jensen

Personal details
- Born: Edward Joseph Walsh; 30 June 1894 Mackay, Queensland, Australia
- Died: 82 Brisbane, Queensland, Australia
- Resting place: Hemmant Cemetery
- Party: Independent
- Other political affiliations: Labor, Queensland Labor Party
- Spouse(s): Jessie Winifred Bailey (m.1922 d.1951), Ellen Virena Curnow (m.1955 d.1978)
- Occupation: Bushworker, Sugar cane farmer

Edward Joseph Walsh (30 June 1894 – 11 December 1976) was a member of the Queensland Legislative Assembly. He served two separate terms as deputy premier as well as being the state treasurer.

== Biography ==
Walsh was born in Mackay, Queensland, the son of Irish-born parents, Michael Walsh, a publican, and his wife Margaret (née Barrett). He was raised in a catholic orphanage from the age of five and as a child he was blinded in both eyes by trachoma. He was taken to the hospital in Rockhampton where he lay for six months, unable to see. His eyesight improved slightly but he required several long stays in hospital and the fight to save his vision continued in later life. He received only a rudimentary education before working as a rural labourer and railway fettler.

On 24 May 1922 Walsh married Jessie Winifred Bailey, a schoolteacher, at the Church of the Holy Spirit, Capella and together had two sons and a daughter. Jessie died in 1951 and Walsh then married Ellen Virena Curnow (died 1978) in 1955 at the residence of the Catholic Archbishop of Brisbane, James Duhig. Walsh died in February 1976 and was buried in the Hemmant Cemetery.

== Public career ==
At the 1935 Queensland state election, Walsh, a member of the Labor Party, defeated the Country and Progressive National Party candidate and future Prime Minister of Australia, Arthur Fadden, for the seat of Mirani in the Queensland Legislative Assembly. He held Mirani until the 1947 state election when he was defeated by Ernie Evans of the Country Party. As Walsh was the Deputy Premier of Queensland at the time, efforts were made to immediately find a safe Labor electorate for him but in the end he had to wait until the 1950 state election to be back in the parliament, this time as the member for Bundaberg. He went on to represent the seat until his retirement in 1969.

When the Premier of Queensland, Vince Gair, was expelled from the Labor Party over his refusal to obey party policy to grant three weeks annual leave for public servants, he, along with Walsh and most of the Ministry then formed the Queensland Labor Party and attempted to govern as a minority government but five weeks later lost a vote on supply and an election was called. Whilst Walsh kept his seat, both Labor parties suffered losses, and for the first time since 1932, a conservative government ruled Queensland. When the QLP amalgamated with the national Democratic Labor Party Walsh refused to support it and at the 1963 and 1966 state elections stood as an independent.

Whilst he was strongly anti-communist, he at first opposed banning the Communist Party of Australia, but in 1951 he supported the 'Yes' case in the Federal referendum. In October 1944, Walsh engaged in a fist-fight with Tom Aikens, the newly elected Independent member for Mundingburra in the Speaker's lobby. When both members were ordered to appear before the Bar of the House to answer the charge of having created a disturbance, they tendered their apologies to the Parliament.

While intensely loyal to his friends, he was extremely hostile to his enemies, of whom there were many. It was alleged that Walsh had a "little black book" in which a record of his fellow parliamentarians' indiscretions was kept for use in times of "trouble" and "difficulties". Nor was he averse to using his position to bestow gifts in the form of Golden Casket art union franchises.

Walsh held several portfolios in the Labor Ministry, and they included:

- Deputy Premier 1946–47 and 1957
- Treasurer 1952–57
- Minister for Transport 1944–47
- Minister for Public Lands 1940–44
- Acting Treasurer 1951–52

Political offices
Preceded by Ned Hanlon	Deputy Premier of Queensland; 1946–1947	Succeeded by Vince Gair
Preceded by Jack Duggan	Deputy Premier of Queensland; 1957	Succeeded by Kenneth Morris
Preceded by Vince Gair	Treasurer of Queensland; 1952–1957	Succeeded by Thomas Hiley
Parliament of Queensland
Preceded by Edward Swayne	Member for Mirani; 1935–1947	Succeeded by Ernie Evans
Preceded by Frank Barnes	Member for Bundaberg; 1950–1969	Succeeded by Lou Jensen
