= James Heading =

Australian politician

Sir James Heading CMG, DCM, MM
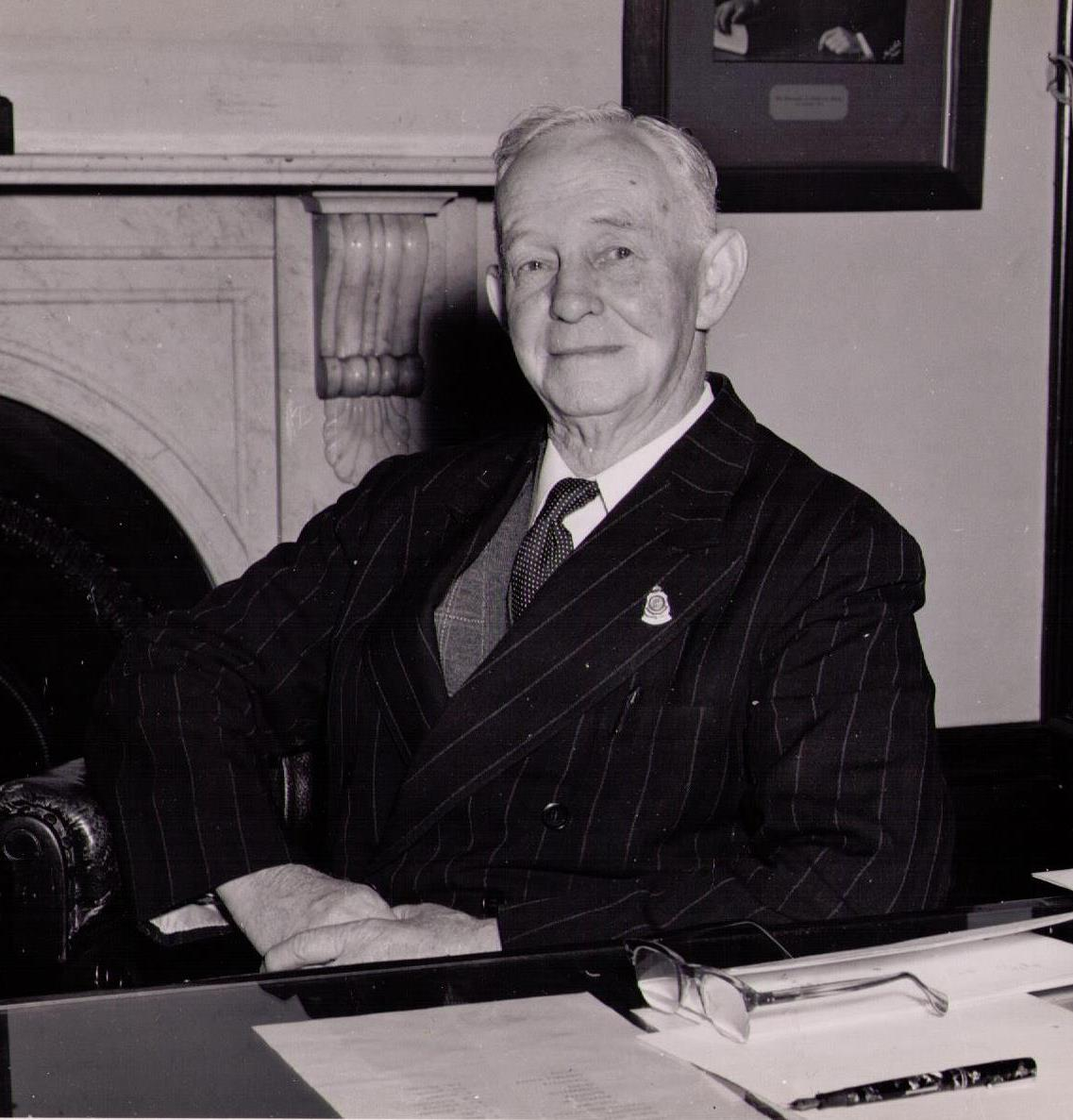

Member of the Queensland Legislative Assembly for Wide Bay
- In office 3 May 1947 – 29 April 1950
- Preceded by: Ernest Clayton
- Succeeded by: Seat abolished

Member of the Queensland Legislative Assembly for Marodian
- In office 29 April 1950 – 27 May 1960
- Preceded by: New seat
- Succeeded by: Seat abolished

Personal details
- Born: James Alfred Heading; 28 January 1884 Payneham, South Australia, Australia
- Died: 9 April 1969 (aged 85) Murgon, Queensland, Australia
- Party: Country Party
- Spouse: Ruby Jeanie Thomas
- Occupation: Cattle breeder, Grazier, Soldier

Sir James Alfred Heading (28 January 1884 – 9 April 1969) was an Australian politician.

== Politics ==
Harding was the Country Party member of the Legislative Assembly of Queensland for Wide Bay from 1947 to 1950 and for Marodian from 1950 to 1960. He was the Minister for Public Works and Local Government and Immigration from 12 August 1957 to 9 June 1960.

Parliament of Queensland
Preceded by Ernest Clayton	Member for Wide Bay; 1947 - 1950	Abolished
New seat	Member for Marodian; 1950 - 1960	Abolished
