= Ned Hanlon (politician) =

Australian politician (1887-1952)

The Honourable Ned Hanlon
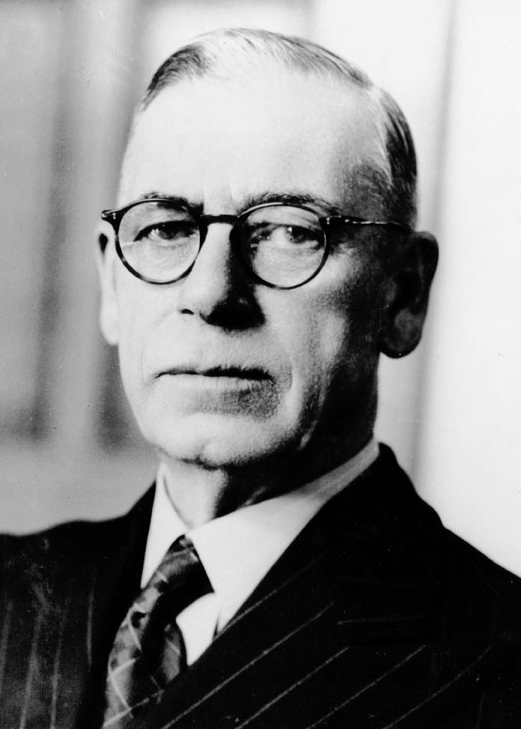

26th Premier of Queensland
- In office 7 March 1946 – 15 January 1952
- Monarch: George VI
- Governor: Leslie Wilson; John Lavarack
- Deputy: Ted Walsh; Vince Gair
- Preceded by: Frank Arthur Cooper
- Succeeded by: Vince Gair

12th Deputy Premier of Queensland
- In office 16 September 1942 – 7 March 1946
- Premier: Frank Arthur Cooper
- Preceded by: Frank Arthur Cooper
- Succeeded by: Ted Walsh
Party leadership positions
Leader of the Labor Party in Queensland
In office 7 March 1946 – 15 January 1952
Deputy	Ted Walsh; Vince Gair
Preceded by	Frank Arthur Cooper
Succeeded by	Vince Gair
Deputy Leader of the Labor Party in Queensland
In office 16 September 1942 – 7 March 1946
Preceded by	Frank Arthur Cooper
Succeeded by	Jack Duggan
Cabinet posts
Chief Secretary
In office 7 March 1946 – 17 January 1952
Preceded by	Frank Arthur Cooper
Succeeded by	Vince Gair
30th Treasurer of Queensland
In office 27 April 1944 – 7 March 1946
Premier	Frank Cooper
Preceded by	Frank Arthur Cooper
Succeeded by	James Larcombe
Secretary for Health and Home Affairs
In office 21 May 1935 – 27 April 1944
Premier	William Forgan Smith
Preceded by	Position established
Succeeded by	Tom Foley
Home Secretary
In office 18 June 1932 – 21 May 1935
Premier	William Forgan Smith
Preceded by	Jens Peterson
Succeeded by	Position abolished
Electorate
Member of the Legislative Assembly for Ithaca
In office 8 May 1926 – 15 January 1952
Preceded by	John Gilday
Succeeded by	Leonard Eastment

Personal details
- Born: Edward Michael Hanlon; 1 October 1887 Paddington, Colony of Queensland
- Died: 15 January 1952 (aged 64) South Brisbane, Queensland, Australia
- Cause of death: Bronchial pneumonia
- Resting place: Toowong Cemetery
- Party: Queensland Labor
- Spouse: Elizabeth Carver (m. 1922; died 1946)
- Relations: Martin Hanson (son-in-law)
- Children: 4, including Pat
- Education: Petrie Terrace Boys' School
- Alma mater: Brisbane Technical College

Military service
- Allegiance: Australia
- Branch/service: Australian Army
- Years of service: 1915–1919
- Rank: Sergeant
- Unit: 9th Battalion, First Australian Imperial Force
- Battles/wars: World War I

Edward Michael Hanlon (1 October 1887 – 15 January 1952), nicknamed the "Digger Premier", was an Australian politician and soldier, who was Premier of Queensland from 1946 until his death in 1952.

== Early life ==
Ned Hanlon was born on 1 October 1887 in the Brisbane working-class suburb of Paddington to Irish parents Michael and Mary Anne Hanlon (née Byrne). Ned's father Michael was an agricultural labourer at the time of his birth. Ned was one of seven children, two of which had been born in Ireland prior to the Hanlon family's migration to Queensland in 1880. After living briefly in the Brisbane suburbs of Paddington and Spring Hill, the Hanlon family moved to Barambah Creek near Gayndah in the North Burnett Region. The family farmed for around eight years before a prolonged drought forced them back to Brisbane.

Upon moving back to Brisbane, Hanlon began his first years of formal education at Red Hill and later Petrie Terrace Boys' School. During this period he, alongside brother Frank, also began delivering milk before and after school. At 14-years-old Hanlon left school and worked as a messenger boy for a group of barristers, and later in a grocery store where he earned fifteen shillings a week. Hanlon also attended night classes at the Brisbane Technical College.

== Union days and war ==
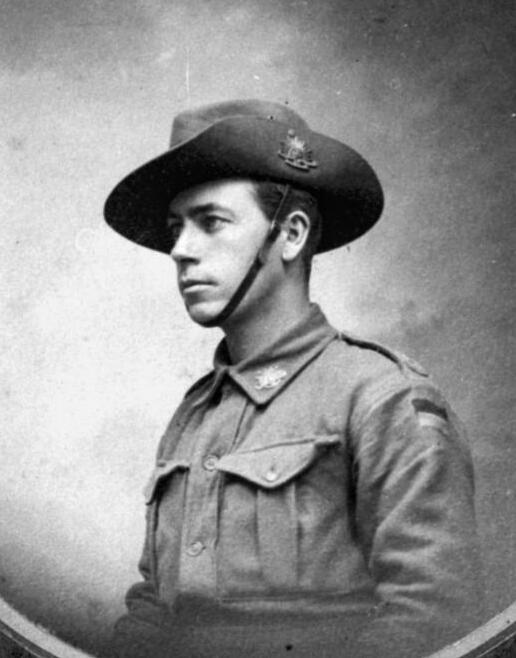
Hanlon with the First Australian Imperial Force in 1917.

In 1908, Hanlon entered the railway service in Brisbane, where he cultivated a growing interest in trade unionism and politics. While working in the railway service, Hanlon was a co-founder of the Queensland Railway Employees Association (QREA), later known as the Australian Railways Union (ARU), alongside future Premier of Queensland Frank Arthur Cooper, for which he served as its vice-president. In the 1912 Brisbane General Strike he played a prominent part as a militant.

Between 1915 and 1919 Hanlon served in the 9th Battalion, 3rd Brigade, 1st Division of the Australian Imperial Force (AIF), whose traditions and battle honours are proudly carried by the modern 9th Battalion, Royal Queensland Regiment. He served under Captain Cec Carroll during the war; in 1934 Hanlon (then Minister for Home Affairs) would appoint Carroll as the Queensland Police Commissioner.

== Political career ==
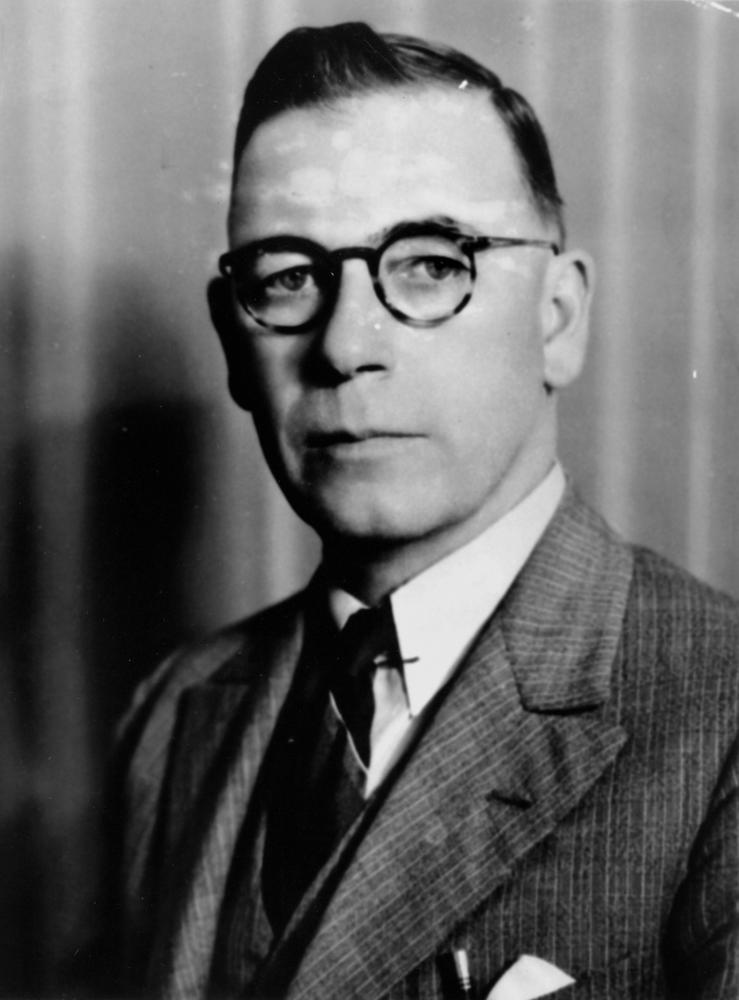
Hanlon as a minister in the William Forgan Smith cabinet, c. 1939

In 1926 Queensland state election, Hanlon was elected to the Queensland Legislative Assembly, representing the Labor Party as member for Ithaca.

=== Home Office and Secretary for Health ===
Between 1935 and 1944, Hanlon served as the Secretary for Health and Home Affairs in the William Forgan Smith ministry, being promoted from the Home Office portfolio which he served in from 1932 to 1935. When Hanlon assumed the office of Home Secretary in 1932, the Health Department, which was then under the administration of Dr John Coffey, who had been appointed Commissioner of Public Health in 1929, remained comparatively modest in scale. A number of health and hospital services, several nominally answerable to the Home Secretary, nevertheless operated with considerable autonomy. Determined to rationalise and centralise Queensland's fragmented system of health administration, Hanlon sought Dr Raphael Cilento, an experience medical administrator who at the time was serving within the Commonwealth health administration. In order to secure Cilento's appointment, Hanlon introduced a brief yet highly consequential measure to amend the Health Acts. The resulting Health Acts Amendment Act of 1934 not only created the office of Director-General of Health and Medical Services, to which Cilento was appointed, but also established the complementary position of Deputy Director-General, a role subsequently filled by Coffey.

Cilento's reorganisation of Queensland's health system quickly revealed a strong commitment to centralised authority. The Health Acts Amendment Act of 1936 greatly expanded the powers of the director-general, allowing extensive state oversight of public health, sanitation, and hospital regulation, despite Opposition warnings that such authority was dangerously authoritarian. This centralising trend continued with the Health Acts of 1937, which consolidated earlier legislation into a comprehensive framework that established public health law as paramount within Queensland governance. By 1939, the government's increasingly interventionist approach was further reflected in proposed legislation granting police broad powers to investigate suspected illegal abortions, measures critics denounced as resembling "gestapo methods". By his promotion into the Treasury portfolio, Hanlon was seen as the political architect of the free hospital scheme that had come into being in Queensland in the 1940s after the state Labor Party had passed three pieces of legislation in 1923, 1936, and 1944.

Hanlon's tenure as Minister for Health and Home Affairs produced some of the most consequential achievements of his political career. This assessment was echoed even by former opponents, including Sir Thomas Hiley, who regarded Hanlon's "greatest contribution" as lying in the advancement of Queensland's public health system. Under Hanlon's stewardship, hospital development and broader public health administration progressed further than at any previous period in the state's history.

After his death in January 1952, he was succeeded by Vince Gair, the last leader of the state Labor Party administration which had been in power continuously since 1932.

== Personal life and death ==
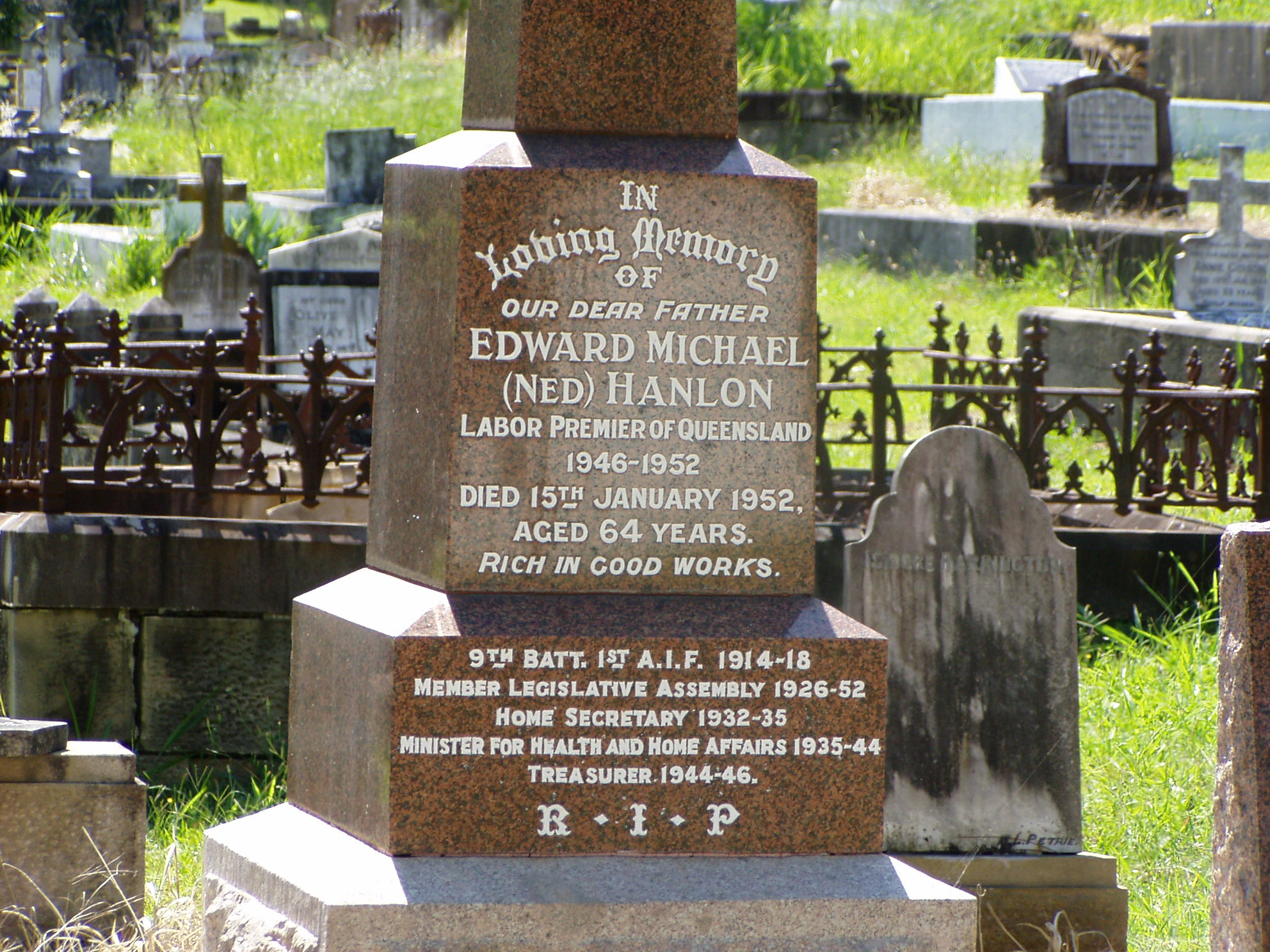
Ned Hanlon's headstone at Brisbane's Toowong Cemetery.

In 1922 Hanlon married Elizabeth Carver, the daughter of an Ashgrove dairy farmer. They had four children, including Pat, the future MLA for Ned's seat of Ithaca (1956–1960) and Baroona (1960–1974). His daughter, Mary Elizabeth married Martin Hanson whom became the Labor MLA for Port Curtis between 1963 and 1976.

On 17 June 1951, while in Canberra, Hanlon contracted bronchial pneumonia and spent three weeks in hospital before returning to Queensland on 5 July. On 8 August, Hanlon was admitted to the Mater private hospital and received oxygen. After surviving, doctors warned that Hanlon would be ill for a long period of time. Following this, he took six months' leave of absence from the premiership. In October, it appeared that Hanlon was well enough to leave the hospital. However, suffering another setback, Hanlon remained in hospital until his death in January 1952. Hanlon was accorded a State funeral which took place from St Stephen's Cathedral to the Toowong Cemetery.

== Bibliography ==
- Fitzgerald, Ross (1984). From 1915 to the Early 1980s: A History of Queensland. University of Queensland Press. ISBN 0-7022-1734-4.
- Murphy, Denis; Joyce, Roger; Cribb, Margaret; Wear, Rae, eds. (1978). The Premiers of Queensland. University of Queensland Press. ISBN 0-7022-3173-8.
- Murphy, D. J.; Joyce, R. B., eds. (1978). Queensland Political Portraits 1859–1952. University of Queensland Press. ISBN 0-7022-1127-3.
- Patrick, Ross (1987). A History of Health & Medicine in Queensland, 1824–1960. University of Queensland Press. ISBN 0-7022-2078-7.
- Wanna, John; Arklay, Tracey (2010). The Ayes Have It: The History of the Queensland Parliament, 1957–1989. ANU Press. ISBN 978-19216-6630-8.

Political offices
Preceded by Frank Arthur Cooper	Premier of Queensland; 1946–1952	Succeeded by Vince Gair
Preceded by Frank Arthur Cooper	Treasurer of Queensland; 1944–1946	Succeeded by James Larcombe
Parliament of Queensland
Preceded by John Gilday	Member for Ithaca; 1926–1952	Succeeded by Leonard Eastment
