= Arthur Jones (Australian politician) =

Australian politician

The Honourable Arthur Jones
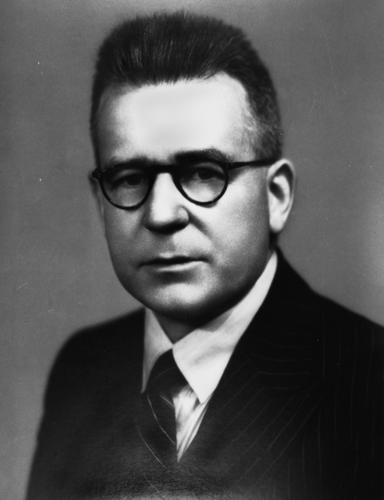

Member of the Queensland Legislative Assembly for Burke
- In office 2 November 1929 – 11 June 1932
- Preceded by: Darby Riordan
- Succeeded by: Seat abolished

Member of the Queensland Legislative Assembly for Charters Towers
- In office 27 May 1939 – 28 May 1960
- Preceded by: William Wellington
- Succeeded by: Seat abolished

Personal details
- Born: Arthur Jones; 12 June 1892 Worcestershire, England
- Died: 30 June 1976 (aged 84) Coorparoo, Queensland, Australia
- Party: QLP
- Other political affiliations: Labor
- Spouse: Margaret Fanny Bennett (m.1926)
- Occupation: Shearer

Arthur Jones (12 June 1892 – 30 June 1976) was a shearer and member of the Queensland Legislative Assembly. He was born at Lower Barnes, near Kidderminster, Worcestershire, England.

== Early days ==
Murphy was born at Worcestershire, England, to Thomas Jones and his wife Mary Anne (née Nutting) and was educated in Wolverley. As a child he moved to Canada but returned to England. He then travelled alone to Australia arriving in March 1911 where he became a "gun" shearer in the Hunter Valley and in January 1916 arrived in Queensland. In 1924–25 he demonstrated his shearing abilities at the British Empire Exhibition at Wembley in England and he was able to shear 200 sheep in an eight-hour day.

== Political career ==
From 1920 until 1929 Jones was an official with the Australian Workers Union which helped launch his career in politics. In 1929 he won the seat of Burke, replacing Darby Riordan who had resigned the seat to successfully contest the House of Representatives seat of Kennedy in the federal parliament. In 1932 Burke was abolished and for the next seven years he was an investigation officer with the Department of Labour and Industry.

In 1939, the member for Charters Towers, William Wellington, died of pneumonia and Jones easily won the resulting by-election. He went on to hold the seat for 21 years and during that time he held five different titles. He was Secretary for Mines in 1942, Secretary for Public Instruction 1942–44, Secretary for Public Lands 1944–47, Secretary for Health and Home Affairs 1947–50 and Secretary for Labour and Industry 1950–57. When the Labor Party split in 1957 Jones joined Premier Vince Gair in forming the Queensland Labor Party.

== Personal life ==
Jones was an avid reader and a keen gardener and lawn bowler. He represented Queensland at both soccer and lawn bowls.

In 1926 he married Margaret Fanny Bennett at St Alban's Anglican Church in Belmore, Sydney, and together they had two daughters. Jones died in 1976 and was cremated.

Parliament of Queensland
Preceded by Darby Riordan	Member for Burke; 1929–1932	Abolished
Preceded by William Wellington	Member for Charters Towers; 1939–1960	Abolished
