= Electoral results for the district of Cairns =

Queensland, Australia, district election results

This is a list of electoral results for the electoral district of Cairns in Queensland state elections.

== Members for Cairns ==
Member	Party	Term
Frederick Wimble	Liberal	1888–1890
Frederick Wimble	Opposition	1890–1893
Thomas Joseph Byrnes	Ministerial	1893–1896
Isidor Lissner	Ministerial	1896–1899
Thomas Givens	Labor	1899–1902
James Lyons	Conservative	1902–1904
John Mann	Labor	1904–1907
John Mann	Kidstonites	1907–1909
John Mann	Independent Opposition	1909–1912
William McCormack	Labor	1912–1930
John O'Keefe	Labor	1930–1942
Lou Barnes	Independent Labor	1942–1947
Thomas Crowley	Labor	1947–1956
Watty Wallace	Labor	1956–1964
Ray Jones	Labor	1965–1983
Keith De Lacy	Labor	1983–1998
Desley Boyle	Labor	1998–2012
Gavin King	Liberal National	2012–2015
Rob Pyne	Labor	2015–2016
Rob Pyne	Independent	2016–2017
Michael Healy	Labor	2017–present

== Election results ==
=== Elections in the 2020s ===
2024 Queensland state election: Cairns
Party	Candidate	Votes	%	±%
Labor	Michael Healy	10,900	36.07	−8.13
Liberal National	Yolonde Entsch	9,796	32.41	−4.07
One Nation	Geena Court	5,099	16.87	+10.94
Greens	Josh Holt	3,390	11.22	+1.40
Independent	Shane Cuthbert	1,037	3.43	+3.43
Total formal votes		30,222	95.97	−0.49
Informal votes		1,268	4.03	+0.49
Turnout		31,490	79.74	−1.40
Two-party-preferred result
Labor	Michael Healy	15,860	52.48	−3.11
Liberal National	Yolonde Entsch	14,362	47.52	+3.11
Labor hold		Swing	−3.11	

2020 Queensland state election: Cairns
Party	Candidate	Votes	%	±%
Labor	Michael Healy	12,727	44.20	+13.75
Liberal National	Sam Marino	10,505	36.48	+8.78
Greens	Daniel Dench	2,829	9.82	+1.76
One Nation	Darrin Griffith	1,707	5.93	−8.71
Informed Medical Options	Sarah Baxter	724	2.51	+2.51
United Australia	David Wright	302	1.05	+1.05
Total formal votes		28,794	96.46	+0.53
Informal votes		1,056	3.54	−0.53
Turnout		29,850	81.14	+0.16
Two-party-preferred result
Labor	Michael Healy	16,006	55.59	+2.20
Liberal National	Sam Marino	12,788	44.41	−2.20
Labor hold		Swing	+2.20	

=== Elections in the 2010s ===
2017 Queensland state election: Cairns
Party	Candidate	Votes	%	±%
Labor	Michael Healy	8,649	30.4	−14.0
Liberal National	Sam Marino	7,871	27.7	−9.7
Independent	Rob Pyne	5,440	19.2	+19.2
One Nation	Ian Hodge	4,157	14.6	+14.6
Greens	Aaron McDonald	2,290	8.1	+0.3
Total formal votes		28,407	95.9	−1.7
Informal votes		1,206	4.1	+1.7
Turnout		29,613	81.0	−0.4
Two-party-preferred result
Labor	Michael Healy	15,167	53.4	−4.1
Liberal National	Sam Marino	13,240	46.6	+4.1
Labor hold		Swing	−4.1	

2015 Queensland state election: Cairns
Party	Candidate	Votes	%	±%
Labor	Rob Pyne	13,770	45.60	+18.12
Liberal National	Gavin King	10,960	36.30	−6.21
Palmer United	Jeanette Sackley	2,902	9.61	+9.61
Greens	Myra Gold	2,010	6.66	−0.45
Independent	Bernice Kelly	553	1.83	+1.83
Total formal votes		30,195	97.61	−0.07
Informal votes		739	2.39	+0.07
Turnout		30,934	85.24	−2.59
Two-party-preferred result
Labor	Rob Pyne	16,563	58.45	+17.32
Liberal National	Gavin King	11,774	41.55	−17.32
Labor gain from Liberal National		Swing	+17.32	

2012 Queensland state election: Cairns
Party	Candidate	Votes	%	±%
Liberal National	Gavin King	11,632	42.51	+2.76
Labor	Kirsten Lesina	7,520	27.48	−18.30
Katter's Australian	Darren Hunt	5,125	18.73	+18.73
Greens	Geoff Holland	1,946	7.11	−3.85
Independent	John Piva	1,141	4.17	+4.17
Total formal votes		27,364	97.68	+0.09
Informal votes		663	2.32	−0.09
Turnout		28,015	87.83	+0.99
Two-party-preferred result
Liberal National	Gavin King	13,573	58.87	+13.02
Labor	Kirsten Lesina	9,481	41.13	−13.02
Liberal National gain from Labor		Swing	+13.02	

=== Elections in the 2000s ===
2009 Queensland state election: Cairns
Party	Candidate	Votes	%	±%
Labor	Desley Boyle	12,309	45.8	−3.5
Liberal National	Joel Harrop	10,689	39.8	+5.5
Greens	Steve Brech	2,947	11.0	+2.8
Family First	Janice Skipp	943	3.5	+3.5
Total formal votes		26,888	97.4	
Informal votes		663	2.6	
Turnout		27,551	86.8	
Two-party-preferred result
Labor	Desley Boyle	13,641	54.2	−3.8
Liberal National	Joel Harrop	11,548	45.8	+3.8
Labor hold		Swing	−3.8	

2006 Queensland state election: Cairns
Party	Candidate	Votes	%	±%
Labor	Desley Boyle	10,598	49.2	+3.5
Liberal	Wendy Richardson	7,260	33.7	−5.1
Independent	Michael Mansfield	1,753	8.1	+8.1
Greens	Steven Nowakowski	1,747	8.1	+0.4
Independent	Peter Sandercock	180	0.8	+0.8
Total formal votes		21,538	97.4	−0.5
Informal votes		567	2.6	+0.5
Turnout		22,105	85.9	−1.0
Two-party-preferred result
Labor	Desley Boyle	11,724	58.1	+4.2
Liberal	Wendy Richardson	8,465	41.9	−4.2
Labor hold		Swing	+4.2	

2004 Queensland state election: Cairns
Party	Candidate	Votes	%	±%
Labor	Desley Boyle	9,962	45.7	−5.8
Liberal	Bob Manning	8,453	38.8	+38.8
One Nation	Ian Noon	1,701	7.8	−12.5
Greens	Meredyth Woodward	1,672	7.7	+1.7
Total formal votes		21,788	97.9	−0.2
Informal votes		460	2.1	+0.2
Turnout		22,248	86.9	−1.9
Two-party-preferred result
Labor	Desley Boyle	10,949	53.9	−10.9
Liberal	Bob Manning	9,363	46.1	+46.1
Labor hold		Swing	−10.9	

2001 Queensland state election: Cairns
Party	Candidate	Votes	%	±%
Labor	Desley Boyle	11,170	51.5	+12.9
National	Naomi Wilson	4,819	22.2	+15.1
One Nation	Peter Gargan	4,394	20.3	−8.1
Greens	Alistair Hart	1,297	6.0	+2.5
Total formal votes		21,680	98.1	
Informal votes		419	1.9	
Turnout		22,099	88.8	
Two-party-preferred result
Labor	Desley Boyle	12,400	64.8	+11.3
National	Naomi Wilson	6,730	35.2	−11.3
Labor hold		Swing	+11.3	

=== Elections in the 1990s ===
1998 Queensland state election: Cairns
Party	Candidate	Votes	%	±%
Labor	Desley Boyle	7,186	39.1	−7.8
One Nation	Peter Boniface	5,067	27.5	+27.5
Liberal	Myles Thompson	4,318	23.5	−18.3
Independent	Nev Bates	994	5.4	+5.4
Greens	Jonathan Metcalfe	835	4.5	−2.9
Total formal votes		18,400	98.7	+0.3
Informal votes		250	1.3	−0.3
Turnout		18,650	88.5	+4.2
Two-candidate-preferred result
Labor	Desley Boyle	9,035	52.3	+0.0
One Nation	Peter Boniface	8,253	47.7	+47.7
Labor hold		Swing	+0.0	

1995 Queensland state election: Cairns
Party	Candidate	Votes	%	±%
Labor	Keith De Lacy	8,186	46.8	−6.2
Liberal	Myles Thompson	7,312	41.8	+17.6
Greens	Pat Daly	1,296	7.4	−1.0
Democrats	Raymond Broomhall	695	4.0	+4.0
Total formal votes		17,489	98.4	+0.5
Informal votes		291	1.6	−0.5
Turnout		17,780	84.3	
Two-party-preferred result
Labor	Keith De Lacy	8,891	52.3	−8.8
Liberal	Myles Thompson	8,094	47.7	+8.8
Labor hold		Swing	−8.8	

1992 Queensland state election: Cairns
Party	Candidate	Votes	%	±%
Labor	Keith De Lacy	9,273	53.0	−8.4
Liberal	Kel Ryan	4,246	24.3	+22.4
National	Ron Balodis	2,511	14.3	−22.4
Greens	Jonathan Metcalfe	1,476	8.4	+8.4
Total formal votes		17,506	97.8	
Informal votes		388	2.2	
Turnout		17,894	84.8	
Two-party-preferred result
Labor	Keith De Lacy	10,062	61.1	−0.6
Liberal	Kel Ryan	6,395	38.9	+38.9
Labor hold		Swing	−0.6	

=== Elections in the 1980s ===
1989 Queensland state election: Cairns
Party	Candidate	Votes	%	±%
Labor	Keith De Lacy	9,937	62.9	+6.7
National	Wally Scholtens	5,855	37.1	−6.7
Total formal votes		15,792	94.4	−1.9
Informal votes		929	5.6	+1.9
Turnout		16,721	85.2	−2.4
Labor hold		Swing	+6.7	

1986 Queensland state election: Cairns
Party	Candidate	Votes	%	±%
Labor	Keith De Lacy	8,340	56.2	+5.6
National	Terry Adair	6,492	43.8	+1.8
Total formal votes		14,832	96.7	
Informal votes		500	3.3	
Turnout		15,332	87.6	
Labor hold		Swing	+3.3	

1983 Queensland state election: Cairns
Party	Candidate	Votes	%	±%
Labor	Keith De Lacy	9,253	50.6	−8.1
National	Christian Bolton	7,686	42.0	+17.7
Liberal	Lionel Van Dorssen	1,359	7.4	−7.2
Total formal votes		18,298	97.9	−0.4
Informal votes		389	2.1	+0.4
Turnout		18,687	89.2	+3.4
Two-party-preferred result
Labor	Keith De Lacy	9,557	52.2	−11.7
National	Christian Bolton	8,741	47.8	+11.7
Labor hold		Swing	−11.7	

1980 Queensland state election: Cairns
Party	Candidate	Votes	%	±%
Labor	Ray Jones	9,471	58.7	+1.6
National	Nigel Ette	3,928	24.3	−5.4
Liberal	Francis Hoyal	2,359	14.6	+8.0
Independent	Melvin Stewart	290	1.8	+1.8
Independent	John Stamp	90	0.6	+0.6
Total formal votes		16,138	98.3	0.0
Informal votes		274	1.7	0.0
Turnout		16,412	85.8	−3.0
Two-party-preferred result
Labor	Ray Jones	10,310	63.9	+2.5
National	Nigel Ette	5,828	36.1	−2.5
Labor hold		Swing	+2.5	

=== Elections in the 1970s ===
1977 Queensland state election: Cairns
Party	Candidate	Votes	%	±%
Labor	Ray Jones	8,704	57.1	+6.3
National	Victor Piccone	4,533	29.7	−4.2
Democrats	Neville Modystack	1,012	6.6	+6.6
Liberal	Charles Bellairs	1,003	6.6	+6.6
Total formal votes		15,252	98.3	
Informal votes		259	1.7	
Turnout		15,511	88.8	
Two-party-preferred result
Labor	Ray Jones	9,370	61.4	+4.2
National	Victor Piccone	5,882	38.6	−4.2
Labor hold		Swing	+4.2	

1974 Queensland state election: Cairns
Party	Candidate	Votes	%	±%
Labor	Ray Jones	6,810	50.8	−15.7
National	Robert Duncan	4,555	33.9	+15.7
Independent	William Whelan	1,783	13.3	+13.3
Australia	Robert Ellwood	268	2.0	+2.0
Total formal votes		13,416	98.0	−0.3
Informal votes		268	2.0	+0.3
Turnout		13,684	89.1	−1.2
Two-party-preferred result
Labor	Ray Jones	7,684	57.3	−11.5
National	Robert Duncan	5,732	42.7	+11.5
Labor hold		Swing	−11.5	

1972 Queensland state election: Cairns
Party	Candidate	Votes	%	±%
Labor	Ray Jones	8,160	66.5	+6.4
Country	Arthur Kalman	2,230	18.2	+1.5
Liberal	David Palmer	1,003	8.2	−5.9
Queensland Labor	Bernard Marsh	887	7.2	+3.5
Total formal votes		12,280	98.3	
Informal votes		208	1.7	
Turnout		12,488	90.3	
Two-party-preferred result
Labor	Ray Jones	8,450	68.8	+4.1
Country	Arthur Kalman	3,830	31.2	−4.1
Labor hold		Swing	+4.1	

=== Elections in the 1960s ===
1969 Queensland state election: Cairns
Party	Candidate	Votes	%	±%
Labor	Ray Jones	7,905	60.1	+8.8
Country	Victor Piccone	2,194	16.7	+4.2
Liberal	David De Jarlais	1,853	14.1	−3.9
Independent	Phyllis Penridge	717	5.5	+5.5
Queensland Labor	Edward Svendsen	493	3.7	+2.1
Total formal votes		13,162	97.9	+1.9
Informal votes		288	2.1	−1.9
Turnout		13,450	91.8	−1.6
Two-party-preferred result
Labor	Ray Jones	8,615	65.5	+3.9
Country	Victor Piccone	4,547	34.5	−3.9
Labor hold		Swing	+3.9	

1966 Queensland state election: Cairns
Party	Candidate	Votes	%	±%
Labor	Ray Jones	6,343	51.3	−13.5
Liberal	David De Jarlais	2,224	18.0	+18.0
Independent	Colin Penridge	2,036	16.5	+16.5
Country	John Franzmann	1,550	12.5	−16.8
Queensland Labor	Arthur Trembath	203	1.6	−4.3
Total formal votes		12,356	96.0	−1.8
Informal votes		519	4.0	+1.8
Turnout		12,875	93.4	+0.6
Two-party-preferred result
Labor	Ray Jones	7,616	61.6	−4.3
Liberal	David De Jarlais	4,740	38.4	+4.3
Labor hold		Swing	−4.3	

1963 Queensland state election: Cairns
Party	Candidate	Votes	%	±%
Labor	George Wallace	8,093	64.8	+8.3
Country	Charles Joy	3,654	29.3	−0.6
Queensland Labor	Arthur Trembath	738	5.9	−7.7
Total formal votes		12,485	97.8	−1.2
Informal votes		275	2.2	+1.2
Turnout		12,760	92.8	+2.0
Two-party-preferred result
Labor	George Wallace	8,230	65.9	
Country	Charles Joy	4,255	34.1	
Labor hold		Swing	N/A	

1960 Queensland state election: Cairns
Party	Candidate	Votes	%	±%
Labor	George Wallace	7,057	56.5	
Country	Albert Baggott	3,736	29.9	
Queensland Labor	William Allendorf	1,704	13.6	
Total formal votes		12,497	99.0	
Informal votes		131	1.0	
Turnout		12,628	90.8	
Labor hold		Swing		

=== Elections in the 1950s ===
1957 Queensland state election: Cairns
Party	Candidate	Votes	%	±%
Labor	George Wallace	3,211	38.4	−20.5
Queensland Labor	James Bidner	2,687	32.2	+32.2
Country	Clement Cummings	2,455	29.4	+1.0
Total formal votes		8,353	99.0	+0.1
Informal votes		83	1.0	−0.1
Turnout		8,436	93.2	+3.0
Labor hold		Swing	−13.4	

1956 Queensland state election: Cairns
Party	Candidate	Votes	%	±%
Labor	George Wallace	4,688	58.9	−0.7
Country	Harold Mulry	2,258	28.4	−2.9
Independent	Henry Smallwood	1,008	12.7	+12.7
Total formal votes		7,954	98.9	+0.3
Informal votes		88	1.1	−0.3
Turnout		8,042	90.2	−0.4
Labor hold		Swing	+2.9	

1953 Queensland state election: Cairns
Party	Candidate	Votes	%	±%
Labor	Thomas Crowley	4,546	59.6	+0.5
Country	Arthur Keller	2,389	31.3	−9.6
Protestant Labour	Charles Crawley	406	5.5	+5.5
Communist	Cedric Dyer	292	3.6	+3.6
Total formal votes		7,633	98.6	−0.2
Informal votes		108	1.4	+0.2
Turnout		7,741	90.6	+3.2
Labor hold		Swing	+6.5	

1950 Queensland state election: Cairns
Party	Candidate	Votes	%	±%
Labor	Thomas Crowley	4,275	59.1	
Country	Arthur Farr	2,964	40.9	
Total formal votes		7,239	98.8	
Informal votes		88	1.2	
Turnout		7,327	87.4	
Labor hold		Swing		

=== Elections in the 1940s ===
1947 Queensland state election: Cairns
Party	Candidate	Votes	%	±%
Labor	Thomas Crowley	4,246	40.0	+5.6
Country	Ian MacKinnon	3,307	31.2	+31.2
Frank Barnes Labor	Lou Barnes	3,061	28.8	−36.8
Total formal votes		10,614	99.1	+0.3
Informal votes		100	0.9	−0.3
Turnout		10,714	82.5	+2.9
Labor gain from Frank Barnes Labor		Swing	N/A	

1944 Queensland state election: Cairns
Party	Candidate	Votes	%	±%
Frank Barnes Labor	Lou Barnes	5,790	65.6	+65.6
Labor	Daniel Crowley	3,029	34.4	−21.0
Total formal votes		8,819	98.8	+0.3
Informal votes		109	1.2	−0.3
Turnout		8,928	79.6	−7.4
Frank Barnes Labor gain from Labor		Swing	N/A	

1941 Queensland state election: Cairns
Party	Candidate	Votes	%	±%
Labor	John O'Keefe	5,003	55.4	−0.9
Country	William Griffen	3,193	35.3	+12.9
Independent	Alan Tucker	835	9.3	+9.3
Total formal votes		9,031	98.5	−0.3
Informal votes		135	1.5	+0.3
Turnout		9,166	87.0	−3.6
Labor hold		Swing	−10.5	

- Preferences were not distributed.

=== Elections in the 1930s ===
1938 Queensland state election: Cairns
Party	Candidate	Votes	%	±%
Labor	John O'Keefe	4,597	56.3	−13.0
Country	William Chapman	1,830	22.4	+22.4
Protestant Labour	Robert Smith	1,740	21.3	+21.3
Total formal votes		8,167	98.8	+0.7
Informal votes		99	1.2	−0.7
Turnout		8,266	90.6	+0.4
Labor hold		Swing	N/A	

- Preferences were not distributed.

1935 Queensland state election: Cairns
Party	Candidate	Votes	%	±%
Labor	John O'Keefe	5,285	69.3	
Social Credit	John Clayton	1,910	25.1	
Independent	Alan Tucker	429	5.6	
Total formal votes		7,624	98.1	
Informal votes		147	1.9	
Turnout		7,771	90.2	
Labor hold		Swing		

- Preferences were not distributed.

1932 Queensland state election: Cairns
Party	Candidate	Votes	%	±%
Labor	John O'Keefe	5,354	65.3	
CPNP	James McDonald	2,850	34.7	
Total formal votes		8,204	99.3	
Informal votes		60	0.7	
Turnout		8,264	94.1	
Labor hold		Swing		

=== Elections in the 1920s ===
1929 Queensland state election: Cairns
Party	Candidate	Votes	%	±%
Labor	William McCormack	4,182	56.6	−9.8
CPNP	Ronald Muir	3,210	43.4	+9.8
Total formal votes		7,392	99.1	0.0
Informal votes		67	0.9	0.0
Turnout		7,459	89.8	+1.3
Labor hold		Swing	−9.8	

1926 Queensland state election: Cairns
Party	Candidate	Votes	%	±%
Labor	William McCormack	4,544	66.4	+7.6
CPNP	Thomas Boylan	2,302	33.6	−7.6
Total formal votes		6,846	99.1	+0.8
Informal votes		60	0.9	−0.8
Turnout		6,906	88.5	+6.0
Labor hold		Swing	+7.6	

1923 Queensland state election: Cairns
Party	Candidate	Votes	%	±%
Labor	William McCormack	3,106	58.8	+4.1
United	William Griffin	2,173	41.2	+41.2
Total formal votes		5,279	98.3	−0.5
Informal votes		89	1.7	+0.5
Turnout		5,368	82.5	+3.7
Labor hold		Swing	+4.1	

1920 Queensland state election: Cairns
Party	Candidate	Votes	%	±%
Labor	William McCormack	3,198	54.7	−6.7
Northern Country	Charles Hives	2,650	45.3	+45.3
Total formal votes		5,848	98.8	+0.4
Informal votes		73	1.2	−0.4
Turnout		5,921	78.8	+2.6
Labor hold		Swing	−6.7	

=== Elections in the 1910s ===
1918 Queensland state election: Cairns
Party	Candidate	Votes	%	±%
Labor	William McCormack	3,296	61.4	−9.0
National	William Griffin	2,075	38.6	+9.0
Total formal votes		5,371	98.4	−0.9
Informal votes		88	1.6	+0.9
Turnout		5,459	76.2	−11.6
Labor hold		Swing	−9.0	

1915 Queensland state election: Cairns
Party	Candidate	Votes	%	±%
Labor	William McCormack	2,797	70.4	+19.1
Liberal	Neal Macrossan	1,177	29.6	+29.6
Total formal votes		3,974	99.3	+0.6
Informal votes		28	0.7	−0.6
Turnout		4,002	87.8	+26.2
Labor hold		Swing	N/A	

1912 Queensland state election: Cairns
Party	Candidate	Votes	%	±%
Labor	William McCormack	1,411	51.3	
Independent	John Mann	1,341	48.7	
Total formal votes		2,752	98.7	
Informal votes		37	1.3	
Turnout		3,241	77.9	
Labor gain from Independent		Swing		
