= Results of the 1947 Queensland state election =

Queensland state election, 3 May 1947 Legislative Assembly << 1944–1950 >>
Enrolled voters	697,405				
Votes cast	632,909		Turnout	90.75%	+3.21
Informal votes	8,579		Informal	1.36%	–0.46
Summary of votes by party
Party	Primary votes	%	Swing	Seats	Change
Labor	272,103	43.58%	–1.09	35	– 2
People's Party	160,623	25.73%	+1.01	9	+ 2
Country	121,689	19.49%	+1.89	14	+ 2
Frank Barnes Labor	24,781	3.97%	+1.99	1	– 1
Communist	7,870	1.26%	–1.22	1	± 0
Ind. Labor	6,727	1.08%	–1.33	1	± 0
Hermit Park Labor	4,541	0.73%	–0.38	1	± 0
Ind. Country	2,544	0.41%	+0.08	0	± 0
Independent	23,452	3.75%	–0.96	0	– 1
Total	624,330			62	

This is a list of electoral district results for the 1947 Queensland state election.

== Results by electoral district ==
=== Albert ===
1947 Queensland state election: Albert
Party	Candidate	Votes	%	±%
Country	Tom Plunkett	8,090	68.6	+17.8
Labor	John Rosser	3,037	31.4	−0.5
Total formal votes		11,799	98.7	−0.4
Informal votes		159	1.3	+0.4
Turnout		11,958	89.8	+6.0
Country hold		Swing	+9.1	

=== Aubigny ===
1947 Queensland state election: Aubigny
Party	Candidate	Votes	%	±%
Country	Jim Sparkes	6,140	71.5	+3.3
Labor	John Tomlinson	2,442	28.5	−3.3
Total formal votes		8,582	98.9	−0.3
Informal votes		92	1.1	+0.3
Turnout		8,674	92.4	+3.8
Country hold		Swing	+3.3	

=== Barcoo ===
1947 Queensland state election: Barcoo
Party	Candidate	Votes	%	±%
Labor	Ned Davis	4,137	66.7	−33.3
People's Party	James Keehan	1,740	28.1	+28.1
Frank Barnes Labor	Reginald Parnell	323	5.2	+5.2
Total formal votes		6,200	97.9	
Informal votes		134	2.1	
Turnout		6,334	88.8	
Labor hold		Swing	N/A	

=== Baroona ===
1947 Queensland state election: Baroona
Party	Candidate	Votes	%	±%
Labor	Bill Power	5,810	55.5	+0.2
People's Party	Kenneth Toombes	3,974	37.9	−6.8
Communist	Max Julius	449	4.3	+4.3
Independent	Henry Beck	239	2.3	+2.3
Total formal votes		10,472	98.3	−0.2
Informal votes		178	1.7	+0.2
Turnout		10,650	88.9	+0.9
Labor hold		Swing	+4.1	

=== Bowen ===
1947 Queensland state election: Bowen
Party	Candidate	Votes	%	±%
Communist	Fred Paterson	3,331	39.3	−5.1
Labor	John Barry	2,584	30.5	−8.1
Country	George McLean	2,551	30.1	+13.2
Total formal votes		8,466	99.3	+0.3
Informal votes		57	0.7	−0.3
Turnout		8,523	93.8	+6.1
Communist hold		Swing	+2.8	

=== Bremer ===
1947 Queensland state election: Bremer
Party	Candidate	Votes	%	±%
Labor	Jim Donald	6,715	69.3	−30.7
People's Party	Henry Davidson	2,974	30.7	+30.7
Total formal votes		9,689	98.8	
Informal votes		116	1.2	
Turnout		9,805	91.4	
Labor hold		Swing	N/A	

=== Brisbane ===
1947 Queensland state election: Brisbane
Party	Candidate	Votes	%	±%
Labor	Johnno Mann	4,457	51.0	−7.4
People's Party	Maurice Mitchell	3,310	37.8	−3.8
Independent Labor	Charles Coward	981	11.2	+11.2
Total formal votes		8,748	97.9	+0.3
Informal votes		185	2.1	−0.3
Turnout		8,933	86.9	+1.5
Labor hold		Swing	−1.0	

=== Bulimba ===
1947 Queensland state election: Bulimba
Party	Candidate	Votes	%	±%
Independent Labor	George Marriott	5,544	42.8	+1.0
People's Party	Hilda Brotherton	3,828	29.5	−4.1
Labor	Bob Gardner	3,588	27.7	+3.2
Total formal votes		12,960	98.1	+2.1
Informal votes		244	1.9	−2.1
Turnout		13,204	94.0	−0.8
Independent Labor hold		Swing	+3.8	

=== Bundaberg ===
1947 Queensland state election: Bundaberg
Party	Candidate	Votes	%	±%
Frank Barnes Labor	Frank Barnes	4,828	40.4	+0.4
Labor	Viv Brown	3,940	33.0	−0.4
People's Party	Geoffrey Boreham	3,185	26.6	+5.4
Total formal votes		11,953	99.4	+1.1
Informal votes		73	0.6	−1.1
Turnout		12,026	91.8	+3.5
Frank Barnes Labor hold		Swing	+0.6	

=== Buranda ===
1947 Queensland state election: Buranda
Party	Candidate	Votes	%	±%
Labor	Dick Brown	6,210	52.9	+2.2
People's Party	William Scott	5,525	47.1	−2.2
Total formal votes		11,735	98.9	0.0
Informal votes		127	1.1	0.0
Turnout		11,862	92.5	+3.6
Labor hold		Swing	+2.2	

=== Cairns ===
1947 Queensland state election: Cairns
Party	Candidate	Votes	%	±%
Labor	Thomas Crowley	4,246	40.0	+5.6
Country	Ian MacKinnon	3,307	31.2	+31.2
Frank Barnes Labor	Lou Barnes	3,061	28.8	−36.8
Total formal votes		10,614	99.1	+0.3
Informal votes		100	0.9	−0.3
Turnout		10,714	82.5	+2.9
Labor gain from Frank Barnes Labor		Swing	N/A	

=== Carnarvon ===
1947 Queensland state election: Carnarvon
Party	Candidate	Votes	%	±%
Labor	Paul Hilton	4,380	52.7	−3.9
Country	Harold Phillips	3,930	47.3	+3.9
Total formal votes		8,310	99.1	+4.0
Informal votes		77	0.9	−4.0
Turnout		8,387	87.8	−0.3
Labor hold		Swing	−3.9	

=== Carpentaria ===
1947 Queensland state election: Carpentaria
Party	Candidate	Votes	%	±%
Labor	Norm Smith	3,650	70.2	+12.7
Independent	Walter Grant	1,549	29.8	+29.8
Total formal votes		5,199	94.7	−4.0
Informal votes		290	5.3	+4.0
Turnout		5,489	83.3	+6.3
Labor hold		Swing	N/A	

=== Charters Towers ===
1947 Queensland state election: Charters Towers
Party	Candidate	Votes	%	±%
Labor	Arthur Jones	3,947	63.2	−4.3
Country	Reg Smith	1,459	23.3	+23.3
Independent	George Carbis	843	13.5	+13.5
Total formal votes		6,249	99.1	+0.9
Informal votes		55	0.9	−0.9
Turnout		6,304	91.0	+9.2
Labor hold		Swing	N/A	

=== Cook ===
1947 Queensland state election: Cook
Party	Candidate	Votes	%	±%
Labor	Harold Collins	4,388	55.7	+1.1
Country	Charles Griffin	3,485	44.3	+44.3
Total formal votes		7,873	98.4	+0.1
Informal votes		125	1.6	−0.1
Turnout		7,998	88.9	+6.9
Labor hold		Swing	−10.1	

=== Cooroora ===
1947 Queensland state election: Cooroora
Party	Candidate	Votes	%	±%
Country	David Low	3,069	31.4	−31.1
Frank Barnes Labor	Bill Gresham	2,693	27.6	+27.6
Labor	Robert Spencer	2,217	22.7	−14.8
Independent Country	William Low	1,791	18.3	+18.3
Total formal votes		9,770	98.6	−0.5
Informal votes		142	1.4	+0.5
Turnout		9,912	92.3	+3.3
Country hold		Swing	N/A	

=== Cunningham ===
1947 Queensland state election: Cunningham
Party	Candidate	Votes	%	±%
Country	Malcolm McIntyre	6,099	72.3	+5.1
Labor	John Hilton	2,336	27.7	−5.1
Total formal votes		8,435	99.1	+1.4
Informal votes		80	0.9	−1.4
Turnout		8,515	91.9	−0.2
Country hold		Swing	+5.1	

=== Dalby ===
1947 Queensland state election: Dalby
Party	Candidate	Votes	%	±%
Country	Charles Russell	5,736	59.1	+10.6
Labor	George Wilkes	3,977	40.9	−10.6
Total formal votes		9,713	98.8	+4.4
Informal votes		122	1.2	−4.4
Turnout		9,835	89.3	+0.8
Country gain from Labor		Swing	+10.6	

=== East Toowoomba ===
1947 Queensland state election: East Toowoomba
Party	Candidate	Votes	%	±%
People's Party	Gordon Chalk	5,015	51.8	+51.8
Labor	Les Wood	4,669	48.2	+7.0
Total formal votes		9,684	98.5	−0.2
Informal votes		145	1.5	+0.2
Turnout		9,829	87.6	+2.9
People's Party gain from Labor		Swing	N/A	

=== Enoggera ===
1947 Queensland state election: Enoggera
Party	Candidate	Votes	%	±%
People's Party	Kenneth Morris	7,988	57.5	+12.2
Labor	Mark Scanlan	5,911	42.5	+20.5
Total formal votes		13,899	98.8	+1.0
Informal votes		169	1.2	−1.0
Turnout		14,068	93.0	−0.4
People's Party hold		Swing	N/A	

=== Fassifern ===
1947 Queensland state election: Fassifern
Party	Candidate	Votes	%	±%
Country	Alf Muller	6,690	71.6	+6.2
Labor	Tom Thorpe	2,653	28.4	−1.2
Total formal votes		9,343	96.9	+1.1
Informal votes		301	3.1	−1.1
Turnout		9,644	92.8	−2.5
Country hold		Swing	+2.8	

=== Fitzroy ===
1947 Queensland state election: Fitzroy
Party	Candidate	Votes	%	±%
Labor	Jim Clark	5,538	54.7	+3.3
People's Party	Harry Weir	4,437	43.8	−4.8
Frank Barnes Labor	Gordon Loukes	103	1.0	+1.0
Independent	John Wharton	51	0.5	+0.5
Total formal votes		10,129	99.3	+0.3
Informal votes		67	0.7	−0.3
Turnout		10,196	93.5	+9.0
Labor hold		Swing	+4.1	

=== Fortitude Valley ===
1947 Queensland state election: Fortitude Valley
Party	Candidate	Votes	%	±%
Labor	Samuel Brassington	5,968	59.8	−0.7
People's Party	William Brenan	3,554	35.6	−3.9
Independent	Andrew Knox	463	4.6	+4.6
Total formal votes		9,985	98.2	−0.4
Informal votes		185	1.8	+0.4
Turnout		10,170	90.0	+1.8
Labor hold		Swing	+2.2	

=== Gregory ===
1947 Queensland state election: Gregory
Party	Candidate	Votes	%	±%
Labor	George Devries	3,335	59.6	−40.4
Country	Gordon Lee	2,264	40.4	+40.4
Total formal votes		5,599	98.9	
Informal votes		60	1.1	
Turnout		5,659	81.6	
Labor hold		Swing	N/A	

=== Gympie ===
1947 Queensland state election: Gympie
Party	Candidate	Votes	%	±%
Labor	Thomas Dunstan	3,116	41.7	−6.1
People's Party	Ronald Witham	3,054	40.8	−2.9
Frank Barnes Labor	Ray Smith	875	11.7	+11.7
Independent	Eric Grice	437	5.8	+5.8
Total formal votes		7,482	99.6	+0.1
Informal votes		28	0.4	−0.1
Turnout		7,510	92.5	+4.5
Labor hold		Swing	−1.7	

=== Hamilton ===
1947 Queensland state election: Hamilton
Party	Candidate	Votes	%	±%
People's Party	Harold Taylor	8,370	73.7	−1.5
Labor	Vic Bartlett	2,981	26.3	+1.5
Total formal votes		11,351	98.8	0.0
Informal votes		134	1.2	0.0
Turnout		11,485	91.9	+3.5
People's Party hold		Swing	−1.5	

=== Herbert ===
1947 Queensland state election: Herbert
Party	Candidate	Votes	%	±%
Labor	Stephen Theodore	4,308	48.0	−9.1
Country	Carlisle Wordsworth	2,728	30.4	+30.4
Communist	Les Sullivan	1,936	21.6	−21.3
Total formal votes		8,972	98.8	+1.9
Informal votes		112	1.2	−1.9
Turnout		9,084	88.6	+2.6
Labor hold		Swing	N/A	

=== Ipswich ===
1947 Queensland state election: Ipswich
Party	Candidate	Votes	%	±%
Labor	David Gledson	7,039	61.9	−38.1
People's Party	Harry Shapcott	4,326	38.1	+38.1
Total formal votes		11,365	98.9	
Informal votes		123	1.1	
Turnout		11,488	91.4	
Labor hold		Swing	N/A	

==== By-election ====
- This by-election was caused by the death of David Gledson. It was held on 10 September 1949.

1949 Ipswich state by-election
Party	Candidate	Votes	%	±%
Labor	Ivor Marsden	6,021	53.3	−8.6
Liberal	Selwyn Stephenson	4,906	43.4	+5.3
Communist	Edmund Crisp	364	3.2	+3.2
Total formal votes		11,311	99.4	+0.5
Informal votes		73	0.6	−0.5
Turnout		11,384	92.8	+1.4
Labor hold		Swing	N/A	

=== Isis ===
1947 Queensland state election: Isis
Party	Candidate	Votes	%	±%
Country	William Brand	5,239	68.3	+3.8
Labor	Samuel Round	2,426	31.7	−3.8
Total formal votes		7,665	96.9	+0.9
Informal votes		241	3.1	−0.9
Turnout		7,906	95.6	+2.8
Country hold		Swing	+3.8	

=== Ithaca ===
1947 Queensland state election: Ithaca
Party	Candidate	Votes	%	±%
Labor	Ned Hanlon	7,263	57.5	+3.5
People's Party	Frank Roberts	5,377	42.5	−1.7
Total formal votes		12,640	98.6	−0.3
Informal votes		181	1.4	+0.3
Turnout		12,821	92.3	+0.6
Labor hold		Swing	+2.5	

=== Kelvin Grove ===
1947 Queensland state election: Kelvin Grove
Party	Candidate	Votes	%	±%
Labor	Bert Turner	6,264	50.5	−2.6
People's Party	Kenneth Fielding	6,133	49.5	+2.6
Total formal votes		12,397	97.8	−0.9
Informal votes		147	1.3	+0.9
Turnout		12,675	93.0	+2.5
Labor hold		Swing	−2.6	

=== Kennedy ===
1947 Queensland state election: Kennedy
Party	Candidate	Votes	%	±%
Labor	Cecil Jesson	4,331	44.8	−5.9
People's Party	Robert Johnston	4,079	42.2	+19.1
Communist	John Clubley	1,264	13.1	−13.1
Total formal votes		9,674	98.2	+0.3
Informal votes		178	1.8	−0.3
Turnout		9,852	85.7	+3.4
Labor hold		Swing	N/A	

=== Keppel ===
1947 Queensland state election: Keppel
Party	Candidate	Votes	%	±%
Labor	Walter Ingram	3,593	41.2	+1.1
Country	John Reid	3,422	39.2	+8.2
Frank Barnes Labor	John Harding	1,717	19.7	+19.7
Total formal votes		8,732	98.9	+3.9
Informal votes		93	1.1	−3.9
Turnout		8,825	91.4	+1.3
Labor hold		Swing	−5.2	

=== Kurilpa ===
1947 Queensland state election: Kurilpa
Party	Candidate	Votes	%	±%
Labor	Kerry Copley	5,489	51.6	−1.9
People's Party	Doug Berry	5,144	48.4	+1.9
Total formal votes		10,633	98.4	−0.3
Informal votes		172	1.6	+0.3
Turnout		10,805	90.0	+5.0
Labor hold		Swing	−1.9	

==== By-election ====
- This by-election was caused by the death of Kerry Copley. It was held on 10 September 1949.

1949 Kurilpa state by-election
Party	Candidate	Votes	%	±%
Labor	Tom Moores	5,197	53.6	+2.0
Liberal	Norman Brandon	4,274	44.0	−4.4
Communist	James Slater	232	2.4	+2.4
Total formal votes		9,703	98.6	+0.2
Informal votes		135	1.4	−0.2
Turnout		9,838	87.3	−2.7
Labor hold		Swing	N/A	

=== Logan ===
1947 Queensland state election: Logan
Party	Candidate	Votes	%	±%
People's Party	Thomas Hiley	10,034	60.7	+8.0
Labor	Ferdinand Scholl	6,589	39.3	−8.0
Total formal votes		16,523	99.1	+0.3
Informal votes		145	0.9	−0.3
Turnout		16,668	93.3	+4.2
People's Party hold		Swing	+8.0	

=== Mackay ===
1947 Queensland state election: Mackay
Party	Candidate	Votes	%	±%
Labor	Fred Graham	6,289	60.8	+2.7
Country	Jack Broughton	4,047	39.2	−2.7
Total formal votes		10,336	99.2	+0.3
Informal votes		87	0.8	−0.3
Turnout		10,423	86.7	+4.5
Labor hold		Swing	+2.7	

=== Maranoa ===
1947 Queensland state election: Maranoa
Party	Candidate	Votes	%	±%
Labor	John Taylor	4,319	59.9	+3.7
Country	Finlay Skinner	2,896	40.1	−3.7
Total formal votes		7,215	98.6	+0.3
Informal votes		104	1.4	−0.3
Turnout		7,319	86.3	+4.7
Labor hold		Swing	+3.7	

=== Maree ===
1947 Queensland state election: Maree
Party	Candidate	Votes	%	±%
People's Party	Louis Luckins	5,326	50.6	+50.6
Labor	Leslie Brown	5,204	49.4	+2.7
Total formal votes		10,530	98.8	+0.3
Informal votes		124	1.2	−0.3
Turnout		10,654	92.5	+6.8
People's Party gain from Independent		Swing	N/A	

=== Maryborough ===
1947 Queensland state election: Maryborough
Party	Candidate	Votes	%	±%
Labor	David Farrell	6,015	55.9	−44.1
People's Party	Frank Lawrence	2,555	23.8	+23.8
Frank Barnes Labor	Mary De Mattos	2,184	20.3	+20.3
Total formal votes		10,764	98.4	
Informal votes		161	1.6	
Turnout		10,925	91.2	
Labor hold		Swing	N/A	

=== Merthyr ===
1947 Queensland state election: Merthyr
Party	Candidate	Votes	%	±%
Labor	Bill Moore	5,865	55.4	+0.7
People's Party	Bert Frost	4,726	44.6	−0.7
Total formal votes		10,591	98.3	+0.2
Informal votes		183	1.7	−0.2
Turnout		10,774	90.2	+1.5
Labor hold		Swing	+0.7	

=== Mirani ===
1947 Queensland state election: Mirani
Party	Candidate	Votes	%	±%
Country	Ernie Evans	4,865	58.1	+25.6
Labor	Ted Walsh	3,511	41.9	−5.7
Total formal votes		8,376	99.0	+0.2
Informal votes		83	1.0	−0.2
Turnout		8,459	90.6	+6.1
Country gain from Labor		Swing	+17.5	

=== Mundingburra ===
1947 Queensland state election: Mundingburra
Party	Candidate	Votes	%	±%
Hermit Park Labor	Tom Aikens	4,541	39.6	+4.0
Independent	Arthur Coburn	4,296	37.5	+10.7
Labor	George Parker	2,630	22.9	−5.6
Total formal votes		11,467	99.4	+0.2
Informal votes		67	0.6	−0.2
Turnout		11,534	90.9	+3.7
Hermit Park Labor hold		Swing	N/A	

=== Murrumba ===
1947 Queensland state election: Murrumba
Party	Candidate	Votes	%	±%
Country	Frank Nicklin	10,334	75.9	−24.1
Independent	Samuel Halpin	3,273	24.1	+24.1
Total formal votes		13,607	98.2	
Informal votes		249	1.8	
Turnout		13,856	91.0	
Country hold		Swing	N/A	

=== Nanango ===
1947 Queensland state election: Nanango
Party	Candidate	Votes	%	±%
Country	Joh Bjelke-Petersen	3,733	42.0	−8.1
Frank Barnes Labor	Phil Cameron	2,164	24.4	+24.4
Labor	Daniel Carroll	2,028	22.8	−13.4
Independent Country	Cliff Edwards	753	8.5	+8.5
Independent Labor	Samuel Andrewartha	202	2.3	+2.3
Total formal votes		8,880	99.1	0.0
Informal votes		82	0.9	0.0
Turnout		8,962	93.1	+6.9
Country hold		Swing	N/A	

=== Normanby ===
1947 Queensland state election: Normanby
Party	Candidate	Votes	%	±%
Labor	Tom Foley	3,733	48.4	−6.2
Country	Bill Rundle	2,990	38.7	−6.7
Frank Barnes Labor	Cecil Chandler	998	12.9	+12.9
Total formal votes		7,721	99.0	+0.3
Informal votes		80	1.0	−0.3
Turnout		7,801	91.9	+7.2
Labor hold		Swing	+0.9	

=== Nundah ===
1947 Queensland state election: Nundah
Party	Candidate	Votes	%	±%
Labor	Frank Roberts	7,128	50.8	−0.8
People's Party	Alex Dewar	6,893	49.2	+0.8
Total formal votes		14,021	98.8	−0.1
Informal votes		165	1.2	+0.1
Turnout		14,186	93.4	+3.0
Labor hold		Swing	−0.8	

=== Oxley ===
1947 Queensland state election: Oxley
Party	Candidate	Votes	%	±%
People's Party	Tom Kerr	8,409	59.6	+2.4
Labor	William Wood	5,699	40.4	−2.4
Total formal votes		14,108	97.8	+0.7
Informal votes		314	2.2	−0.7
Turnout		14,422	93.9	+2.9
People's Party hold		Swing	+2.4	

=== Port Curtis ===
1947 Queensland state election: Port Curtis
Party	Candidate	Votes	%	±%
Labor	Jim Burrows	4,199	41.4	−17.9
Country	William McGeever	3,871	38.2	−2.5
Frank Barnes Labor	Peter Neilson	1,520	15.0	+15.0
Independent	Alec Paterson	432	4.3	+4.3
Independent	John Daly	120	1.2	+1.2
Total formal votes		10,142	99.2	+0.3
Informal votes		85	0.8	−0.3
Turnout		10,227	92.5	+5.1
Labor hold		Swing	−7.3	

=== Rockhampton ===
1947 Queensland state election: Rockhampton
Party	Candidate	Votes	%	±%
Labor	James Larcombe	5,312	50.4	−15.1
People's Party	Arthur Gordon	2,981	28.3	+28.3
Independent	Edwin Price	1,193	11.3	+11.3
Frank Barnes Labor	Arthur Webb	1,060	10.0	+10.0
Total formal votes		10,546	99.3	+1.7
Informal votes		74	0.7	−1.7
Turnout		10,620	92.9	+6.4
Labor hold		Swing	−1.4	

=== Sandgate ===
1947 Queensland state election: Sandgate
Party	Candidate	Votes	%	±%
People's Party	Eric Decker	7,904	58.3	−1.2
Labor	Ron McAuliffe	5,664	41.7	+1.2
Total formal votes		13,568	98.8	+0.1
Informal votes		160	1.2	−0.1
Turnout		13,728	93.5	+3.3
People's Party hold		Swing	−1.2	

=== South Brisbane ===
1947 Queensland state election: South Brisbane
Party	Candidate	Votes	%	±%
Labor	Vince Gair	6,072	53.1	−3.2
People's Party	Winston Noble	5,369	46.9	+3.2
Total formal votes		11,441	98.0	+0.4
Informal votes		234	2.0	−0.4
Turnout		11,675	91.8	+9.0
Labor hold		Swing	−3.2	

=== Stanley ===
1947 Queensland state election: Stanley
Party	Candidate	Votes	%	±%
Country	Duncan MacDonald	4,894	58.9	−5.3
Independent	John Hatton	1,863	22.4	+22.4
Independent	William Walters	1,549	18.7	+18.7
Total formal votes		8,306	99.1	−0.1
Informal votes		75	0.9	+0.1
Turnout		8,381	92.7	+1.5
Country hold		Swing	N/A	

=== The Tableland ===
1947 Queensland state election: The Tableland
Party	Candidate	Votes	%	±%
Labor	Harry Bruce	3,781	49.6	+2.6
Country	Herbert Trackson	2,955	38.7	+38.7
Communist	Frank Falls	890	11.7	−11.6
Total formal votes		7,626	98.8	+0.5
Informal votes		96	1.2	−0.5
Turnout		7,722	89.8	+6.4
Labor hold		Swing	−8.1	

=== Toowong ===
1947 Queensland state election: Toowong
Party	Candidate	Votes	%	±%
People's Party	Charles Wanstall	8,375	70.2	+13.6
Labor	Frank Venables	3,549	29.8	+29.8
Total formal votes		11,924	98.9	+0.4
Informal votes		136	1.1	−0.4
Turnout		12,060	91.9	+0.8
People's Party hold		Swing	N/A	

=== Toowoomba ===
1947 Queensland state election: Toowoomba
Party	Candidate	Votes	%	±%
Labor	Jack Duggan	6,878	59.8	−40.2
People's Party	Victor Boettecher	4,623	40.2	+40.2
Total formal votes		11,501	98.1	
Informal votes		225	1.9	
Turnout		11,726	86.8	
Labor hold		Swing	N/A	

=== Townsville ===
1947 Queensland state election: Townsville
Party	Candidate	Votes	%	±%
Labor	George Keyatta	6,306	67.8	+4.9
Country	Fred Feather	2,997	32.2	+32.2
Total formal votes		9,303	98.6	+0.1
Informal votes		128	1.4	−0.1
Turnout		9,431	84.4	+2.6
Labor hold		Swing	N/A	

=== Warrego ===
1947 Queensland state election: Warrego
Party	Candidate	Votes	%	±%
Labor	Harry O'Shea	3,029	49.3	−20.3
Country	Robert King	2,320	37.7	+7.3
Independent	Cyril Healy	797	13.0	+13.0
Total formal votes		6,146	98.8	+1.4
Informal votes		72	1.2	−1.4
Turnout		6,128	85.2	+3.7
Labor hold		Swing	−13.0	

=== Warwick ===
1947 Queensland state election: Warwick
Party	Candidate	Votes	%	±%
Country	Otto Madsen	4,657	51.7	+6.1
Labor	John Healy	4,347	48.3	−6.1
Total formal votes		9,004	99.2	+2.5
Informal votes		72	0.8	−2.5
Turnout		9,076	89.7	−0.5
Country gain from Labor		Swing	+6.1	

=== West Moreton ===
1947 Queensland state election: West Moreton
Party	Candidate	Votes	%	±%
Country	Ted Maher	6,893	81.1	+6.5
Labor	Jack Ryan	1,607	18.9	−6.5
Total formal votes		8,500	99.1	−0.2
Informal votes		75	0.9	+0.2
Turnout		8,575	92.8	+1.5
Country hold		Swing	+6.5	

=== Wide Bay ===
1947 Queensland state election: Wide Bay
Party	Candidate	Votes	%	±%
Country	James Heading	4,953	55.0	−2.1
Frank Barnes Labor	N F Spence	2,150	23.9	+23.9
Labor	George Stockwell	1,903	21.1	−21.8
Total formal votes		9,006	99.1	+0.7
Informal votes		80	0.9	−0.7
Turnout		9,086	90.3	+2.7
Country hold		Swing	N/A	

=== Windsor ===
1947 Queensland state election: Windsor
Party	Candidate	Votes	%	±%
People's Party	Bruce Pie	6,618	58.1	+6.9
Labor	Erle Wettemeyer	4,766	41.9	+1.1
Total formal votes		11,384	99.0	0.0
Informal votes		109	1.0	0.0
Turnout		11,493	92.4	+2.5
People's Party hold		Swing	+2.5	

=== Wynnum ===
1947 Queensland state election: Wynnum
Party	Candidate	Votes	%	±%
Labor	Bill Gunn	8,163	52.7	+16.1
People's Party	Syd Ewart	4,797	31.0	+3.7
Independent	Albert Barrett	1,319	8.5	+8.5
Frank Barnes Labor	Thomas Ebbage	1,208	7.8	+7.8
Total formal votes		15,550	98.2	−0.6
Informal votes		218	1.8	+0.6
Turnout		15,768	92.8	+1.1
Labor hold		Swing	+5.8	

== See also ==
- 1947 Queensland state election
- Candidates of the Queensland state election, 1947
- Members of the Queensland Legislative Assembly, 1947-1950
