= Candidates of the 1947 Queensland state election =

The 1947 Queensland state election was held on 3 May 1947.

== By-elections ==
- On 2 March 1946, Les Wood (Labor) was elected to succeed Herbert Yeates (Country), who had died on 24 December 1945, as the member for East Toowoomba.
- On 10 September 1949, Jim Donald (Labor) was elected to succeed Frank Cooper (Labor), who had resigned on 12 March 1946, as the member for Bremer.

== Retiring Members ==
- Note: Country MLA Harry Clayton (Wide Bay) died prior to the election. No by-election was held.

=== Labor ===
- Ted Hanson MLA (Buranda)
- John Hayes MLA (Nundah)
- Aubrey Slessar MLA (Dalby)
- Tommy Williams MLA (Port Curtis)

=== Country ===
- Jim Edwards MLA (Nanango)
- Harry Walker MLA (Cooroora)

=== People's Party ===
- John Chandler MLA (Hamilton)

== Candidates ==
Sitting members at the time of the election are shown in bold text.

Electorate	Held by	Labor candidate	Coalition candidate	Other candidates
Albert	Country	John Rosser	**Tom Plunkett** (CP)	
Aubigny	Country	John Tomlinson	**Jim Sparkes** (CP)	
Barcoo	Labor	**Ned Davis**	James Keehan (QPP)	Reginald Parnell (FBLP)
Baroona	Labor	**Bill Power**	Kenneth Toombes (QPP)	Henry Beck (Ind); Max Julius (CPA)
Bowen	Communist	John Barry	George McLean (CP)	**Fred Paterson** (CPA)
Bremer	Labor	**Jim Donald**	Henry Davidson (QPP)	
Brisbane	Labor	**Johnno Mann**	Maurice Mitchell (QPP)	Charles Coward (Ind Lab)
Bulimba	Independent Labor	Bob Gardner	Hilda Brotherton (QPP)	**George Marriott** (Ind Lab)
Bundaberg	Frank Barnes Labor	Viv Brown	Geoffrey Boreham (QPP)	**Frank Barnes** (FBLP)
Buranda	Labor	Dick Brown	William Scott (QPP)	
Cairns	Frank Barnes Labor	Thomas Crowley	Ian MacKinnon (CP)	**Lou Barnes** (FBLP)
Carnarvon	Labor	**Paul Hilton**	Harold Phillips (CP)	
Carpentaria	Labor	**Norm Smith**		Walter Grant (Ind)
Charters Towers	Labor	**Arthur Jones**	Reg Smith (CP)	George Carbis (Ind)
Cook	Labor	**Harold Collins**	Charles Griffin (CP)	
Cooroora	Country	Robert Spencer	David Low (CP)	Bill Gresham (FBLP); William Low (Ind CP)
Cunningham	Country	John Hilton	**Malcolm McIntyre** (CP)	
Dalby	Labor	George Wilkes	Charles Russell (CP)	
East Toowoomba	Labor	**Les Wood**	Gordon Chalk (QPP)	
Enoggera	People's Party	Mark Scanlan	**Kenneth Morris** (QPP)	
Fassifern	Country	Tom Thorpe	**Alf Muller** (CP)	
Fitzroy	Labor	**Jim Clark**	Harry Weir (QPP)	Gordon Loukes (FBLP); John Wharton (Ind)
Fortitude Valley	Labor	**Samuel Brassington**	William Brenan (QPP)	Andrew Knox (Ind)
Gregory	Labor	**George Devries**	Gordon Lee (CP)	
Gympie	Labor	**Thomas Dunstan**	Ronald Witham (QPP)	Eric Grice (Ind); Ray Smith (FBLP)
Hamilton	People's Party	Vic Bartlett	Harold Taylor (QPP)	
Herbert	Labor	**Stephen Theodore**	Carlisle Wordsworth (CP)	Les Sullivan (CPA)
Ipswich	Labor	**David Gledson**	Harry Shapcott (QPP)	
Isis	Country	Samuel Round	**William Brand** (CP)	
Ithaca	Labor	**Ned Hanlon**	Frank Roberts (QPP)	
Kelvin Grove	Labor	**Bert Turner**	Kenneth Fielding (QPP)	
Kennedy	Labor	**Cecil Jesson**	Robert Johnston (QPP)	John Clubley (CPA)
Keppel	Labor	**Walter Ingram**	John Reid (CP)	John Harding (FBLP)
Kurilpa	Labor	**Kerry Copley**	Doug Berry (QPP)	
Logan	People's Party	Ferdinand Scholl	**Thomas Hiley** (QPP)	
Mackay	Labor	**Fred Graham**	Jack Broughton (CP)	
Maranoa	Labor	**John Taylor**	Finlay Skinner (CP)	
Maree	Independent	Leslie Brown	**Louis Luckins** (QPP)	
Maryborough	Labor	**David Farrell**	Frank Lawrence (QPP)	Mary De Mattos (FBLP)
Merthyr	Labor	**Bill Moore**	Bert Frost (QPP)	
Mirani	Labor	**Ted Walsh**	Ernie Evans (CP)	
Mundingburra	Hermit Park Labor	George Parker		**Tom Aikens*** (HBLP); Arthur Coburn (Ind)
Murrumba	Country		**Frank Nicklin** (CP)	Samuel Halpin (Ind)
Nanango	Country	Daniel Carroll	Joh Bjelke-Petersen (CP)	Samuel Andrewartha (Ind Lab); Phil Cameron (FBLP); Cliff Edwards (Ind CP)
Normanby	Labor	**Tom Foley**	Bill Rundle (CP)	Cecil Chandler (FBLP)
Nundah	Labor	Frank Roberts	Alex Dewar (QPP)	
Oxley	People's Party	William Wood	**Tom Kerr** (QPP)	
Port Curtis	Labor	Jim Burrows	William McGreever (CP)	John Daly (Ind); Peter Neilson (FBLP); Alec Paterson (Ind)
Rockhampton	Labor	**James Larcombe**	Arthur Gordon (QPP)	Edwin Price (Ind); Arthur Webb (FBLP)
Sandgate	People's Party	Ron McAuliffe	**Eric Decker** (QPP)	
South Brisbane	Labor	**Vince Gair**	Winston Noble (QPP)	
Stanley	Country		**Duncan MacDonald** (CP)	John Hatton (Ind); William Walters (Ind)
The Tableland	Labor	**Harry Bruce**	Herbert Trackson (CP)	Frank Falls (CPA)
Toowong	People's Party	Frank Venables	**Charles Wanstall** (QPP)	
Toowoomba	Labor	**Jack Duggan**	Victor Boettcher (QPP)	
Townsville	Labor	**George Keyatta**	Fred Feather (CP)	
Warrego	Labor	**Harry O'Shea**	Robert King (CP)	Cyril Healy (Ind)
Warwick	Labor	**John Healy**	Otto Madsen (CP)	
West Moreton	Country	Jack Ryan	**Ted Maher** (CP)	
Wide Bay	Country	George Stockwell	James Heading (CP)	N F Spence (FBLP)
Windsor	People's Party	Erle Wettemeyer	**Bruce Pie** (QPP)	
Wynnum	Labor	**Bill Gunn**	Syd Ewart (QPP)	Albert Barrett (Ind); Thomas Ebbage (FBLP)

== See also ==
- 1947 Queensland state election
- Members of the Queensland Legislative Assembly, 1944–1947
- Members of the Queensland Legislative Assembly, 1947–1950
- List of political parties in Australia
