= Members of the Queensland Legislative Assembly, 1947–1950 =

This is a list of members of the 31st Legislative Assembly of Queensland from 1947 to 1950, as elected at the 1947 state election held on 3 May 1947.

During the term, the Queensland People's Party became the Queensland division of the Liberal Party of Australia.

Name	Party	Electorate	Term in office
Tom Aikens	NQLP	Mundingburra	1944–1977
Frank Barnes	Ind. Labor	Bundaberg	1941–1950
Joh Bjelke-Petersen	Country	Nanango	1947–1987
William Brand	Country	Isis	1920–1950
Hon Samuel Brassington	Labor	Fortitude Valley	1927–1932, 1933–1950
Dick Brown	Labor	Buranda	1947–1957
Hon Harry Bruce	Labor	The Tableland	1923–1950
Jim Burrows	Labor	Port Curtis	1947–1963
Gordon Chalk	QPP/Liberal	East Toowoomba	1947–1976
Jim Clark	Labor	Fitzroy	1935–1960
Hon Harold Collins	Labor	Cook	1935–1957
Kerry Copley^{[2]}	Labor	Kurilpa	1932–1949
Thomas Crowley	Labor	Cairns	1947–1956
Ned Davis	Labor	Barcoo	1943–1961
Eric Decker	Country/QPP	Sandgate	1941–1953
Hon George Devries	Labor	Gregory	1941–1957
Jim Donald	Labor	Bremer	1946–1969
Hon Jack Duggan	Labor	Toowoomba	1935–1957, 1958–1969
Thomas Dunstan	Labor	Gympie	1915–1929, 1935–1953
Ernie Evans	Country	Mirani	1947–1965
David Farrell	Labor	Maryborough	1938–1953
Hon Tom Foley	Labor	Normanby	1919–1960
Hon Vince Gair	Labor	South Brisbane	1932–1960
Hon David Gledson^{[1]}	Labor	Ipswich	1915–1929, 1932–1949
Fred Graham	Labor	Mackay	1943–1969
Bill Gunn	Labor	Wynnum	1944–1966
Hon Ned Hanlon	Labor	Ithaca	1926–1952
James Heading	Country	Wide Bay	1947–1960
Thomas Hiley	QPP/Liberal	Logan	1944–1966
Paul Hilton	Labor	Carnarvon	1935–1963
Walter Ingram	Labor	Keppel	1944–1952
Cecil Jesson	Labor	Kennedy	1935–1960
Hon Arthur Jones	Labor	Charters Towers	1929–1932, 1939–1960
Tom Kerr	QPP/Liberal	Oxley	1943–1956
George Keyatta	Labor	Townsville	1939–1960
Hon James Larcombe	Labor	Rockhampton	1912–1929, 1932–1956
David Low	Country	Cooroora	1947–1974
Louis Luckins	QPP/Liberal	Maree	1941–1953
Duncan MacDonald	Country	Stanley	1938–1953
Malcolm McIntyre	Country	Cunningham	1944–1953
Otto Madsen	Country	Warwick	1947–1963
Ted Maher^{[3]}	Country	West Moreton	1929–1949
Johnno Mann	Labor	Brisbane	1936–1969
George Marriott	Ind. Labor	Bulimba	1938–1950
Ivor Marsden^{[1]}	Labor	Ipswich	1949–1966
Hon Bill Moore	Labor	Merthyr	1940–1957
Tom Moores^{[2]}	Labor	Kurilpa	1949–1957
Kenneth Morris	QPP/Liberal	Enoggera	1944–1963
Alf Muller	Country	Fassifern	1935–1969
Frank Nicklin	Country	Murrumba	1932–1968
Harry O'Shea	Labor	Warrego	1941–1950
Fred Paterson	Communist	Bowen	1944–1950
Bruce Pie	QPP/Liberal	Windsor	1941–1943, 1944–1951
Tom Plunkett	Country	Albert	1929–1957
Hon Bill Power	Labor	Baroona	1935–1960
Frank Roberts	Labor	Nundah	1947–1956
Charles Russell^{[3]}	Country	Dalby	1947–1949
Norm Smith	Labor	Carpentaria	1941–1960
Jim Sparkes	Country	Aubigny	1932–1935, 1941–1960
Harold Taylor	QPP/Liberal	Hamilton	1947–1963
John Taylor	Labor	Maranoa	1944–1957
Stephen Theodore	Labor	Herbert	1940–1950
Bert Turner	Labor	Kelvin Grove	1941–1957
Charles Wanstall	QPP/Liberal	Toowong	1944–1950

^{1} On 14 May 1949, the Labor member for Ipswich, David Gledson, died. Labor candidate Ivor Marsden won the resulting by-election on 10 September 1949.
^{2} On 18 July 1949, the Labor member for Kurilpa, Kerry Copley, died. Labor candidate Tom Moores won the resulting by-election on 10 September 1949.
^{3} On 27 October 1949, Ted Maher, the Country member for West Moreton resigned to contest a seat in the Australian Senate at the 1949 federal election. The following day, Charles Russell, the member for Dalby, resigned to contest the seat of Maranoa. No by-elections were held due to the proximity of the 1950 state election

== See also ==
- 1947 Queensland state election
- Hanlon Ministry (Labor) (1946–1952)
