= 1942 Cairns state by-election =

- 31 October 1942

Electoral district of Cairns in the Legislative Assembly of Queensland
- Registered: 10,309
- Turnout: 67.5% (▼19.5)
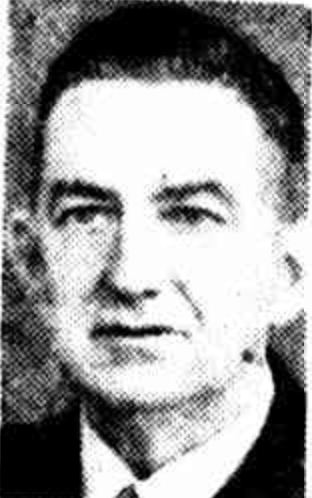

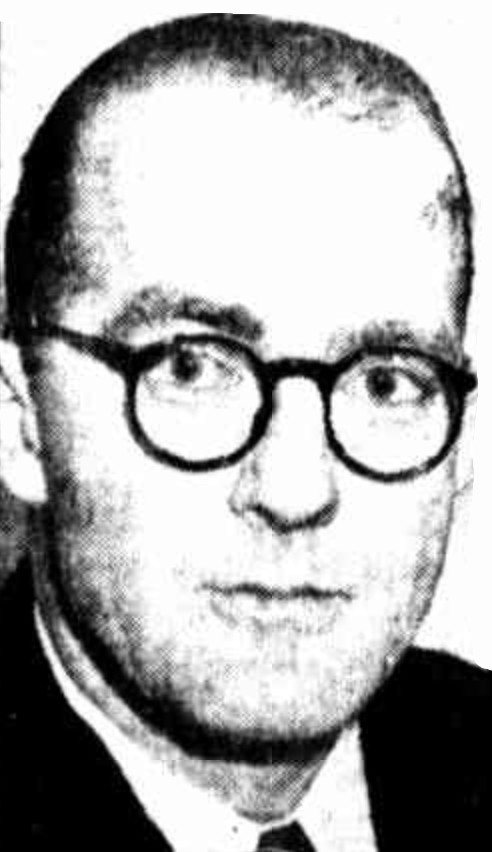

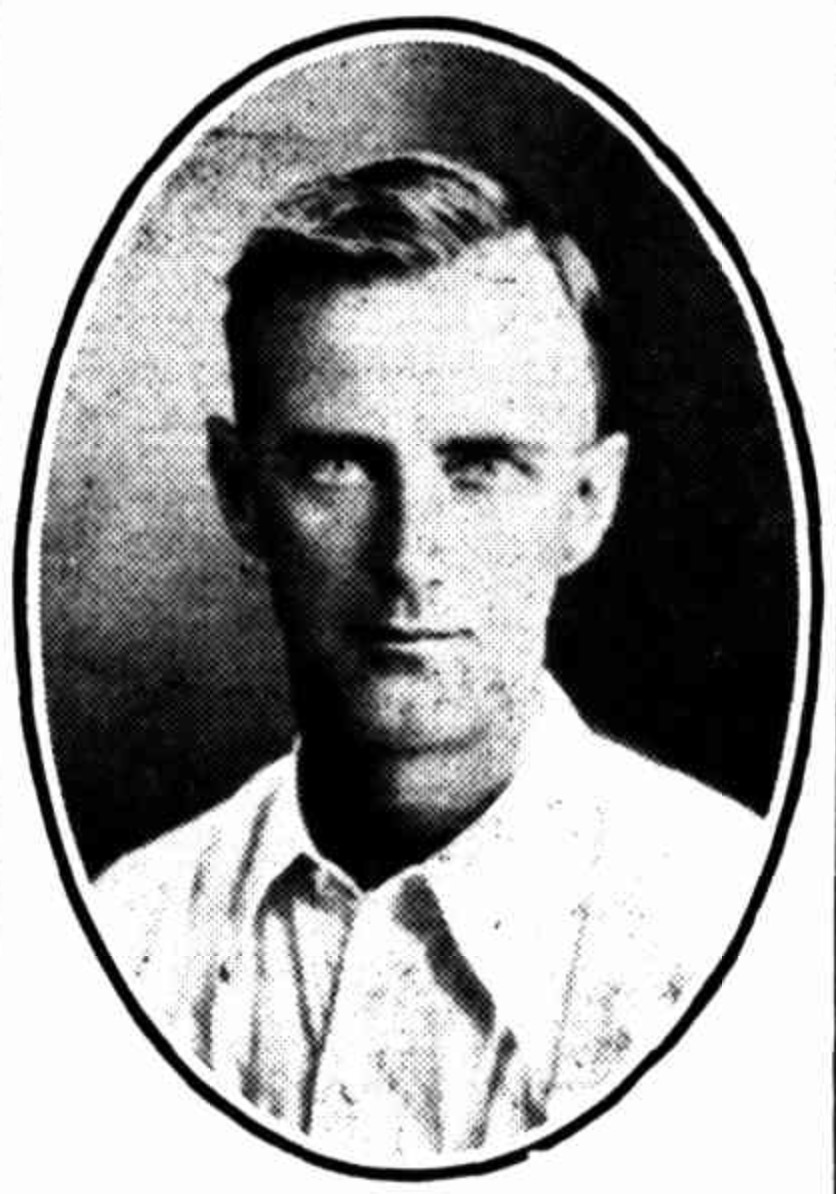

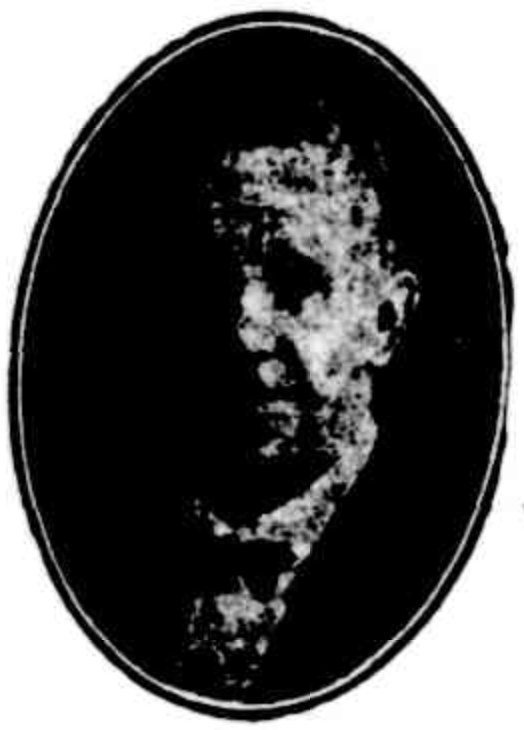
	First party	Second party
Candidate	David Crowley	Lou Barnes
Party	Labor	O'Malley Labor
Primary vote	2,169	2,101
Percentage	31.5%	30.5%
Swing	▼23.9	▲30.5
TCP	49.7%	52.1%
TCP swing	▼5.0	▲52.1
	Third party	Fourth party
Candidate	Alan Tucker	William Griffin
Party	Anti-Fascist	Independent
Primary vote	1,776	851
Percentage	25.7%	12.3%
Swing	▲16.4	▲12.3
MP before election
John O'Keefe
Labor
Elected MP
Lou Barnes
O'Malley Labor

The 1942 Cairns state by-election was held on 31 October 1942 to elect the member for Cairns in the Legislative Assembly of Queensland, following the death of Labor Party MP John O'Keefe.

Lou Barnes, the brother of Bundaberg MP Frank Barnes, won the seat as a King O'Malley Labor candidate. Labor candidate David Crowley suffered a negative primary vote swing of 23.9%, with Barnes winning on 52.1% of the two-candidate-preferred result.

Following the by-election, the electoral system was changed from contingency voting to first-past-the-post after the Labor government introduced a bill to change the system. First-past-the-post was in place for Queensland state elections until full preferential voting was introduced by the Country−Liberal coalition in 1963.

Independent candidate William Griffin contested the by-election on a platform of abolishing the Queensland state parliament.

== Key dates ==
- 27 January 1942 − John O'Keefe dies
- 15 July 1942 − Frank Nicklin says Country Party won't contest by-election
- 21 October 1942 − Candidate nominations
- 31 October 1942 − Polling day
- 11 November 1942 − Return of writ

== Candidates ==
Party	Candidate	Background
King O'Malley Labor	Lou Barnes	Market gardener and former traveler for the Castlemaine Perkins
Labor	David Crowley	President of the Labor Party branch in Cairns
Anti-Fascist	Alan Tucker	Candidate for Cairns in 1935 and 1941
Independent	William Griffin	Former member of the Cairns Harbour Board

== Results ==
1942 Cairns state by-election
Party	Candidate	Votes	%	±%
Labor	David Crowley	2,169	31.5	−23.9
King O'Malley Labor	Lou Barnes	2,101	30.5	+30.5
Anti-Fascist	Alan Tucker	1,776	25.7	+16.4
Independent	William Griffin	851	12.3	+12.3
Total formal votes		6,897	99.1	+0.6
Informal votes		58	0.9	−0.6
Turnout		6,955	67.5	−19.5
Two-candidate-preferred result
King O'Malley Labor	Lou Barnes	2,535	52.1	+52.1
Labor	David Crowley	2,334	47.9	N/A (Note: Preferences were not distributed at the previous election. Therefore there is no previous two-candidate-preferred result upon which to base a swing.)
King O'Malley Labor gain from Labor				

== See also ==
- Electoral results for the district of Cairns
