= Members of the Queensland Legislative Assembly, 1944–1947 =

This is a list of members of the 30th Legislative Assembly of Queensland from 1944 to 1947, as elected at the 1944 state election held on 15 April 1944.

| Name | Party | Electorate | Term in office |
|---|---|---|---|
| Tom Aikens | Ind. Labor | Mundingburra | 1944–1977 |
| Frank Barnes | Ind. Labor | Bundaberg | 1941–1950 |
| Lou Barnes | Ind. Labor | Cairns | 1942–1947 |
| William Brand | Country | Isis | 1920–1950 |
| Hon Samuel Brassington | Labor | Fortitude Valley | 1927–1932, 1933–1950 |
| Hon Harry Bruce | Labor | The Tableland | 1923–1950 |
| John Beals Chandler | QPP | Hamilton | 1943–1947 |
| Jim Clark | Labor | Fitzroy | 1935–1960 |
| Harry Clayton^{[3]} | Country | Wide Bay | 1920–1946 |
| Hon Harold Collins | Labor | Cook | 1935–1957 |
| Hon Frank Cooper^{[2]} | Labor | Bremer | 1915–1946 |
| Kerry Copley | Labor | Kurilpa | 1932–1949 |
| Ned Davis | Labor | Barcoo | 1943–1961 |
| Eric Decker | Country | Sandgate | 1941–1953 |
| George Devries | Labor | Gregory | 1941–1957 |
| Jim Donald^{[2]} | Labor | Bremer | 1946–1969 |
| Jack Duggan | Labor | Toowoomba | 1935–1957, 1958–1969 |
| Thomas Dunstan | Labor | Gympie | 1915–1929, 1935–1953 |
| Jim Edwards | Country | Nanango | 1920–1947 |
| David Farrell | Labor | Maryborough | 1938–1953 |
| Hon Tom Foley | Labor | Normanby | 1919–1960 |
| Hon Vince Gair | Labor | South Brisbane | 1932–1960 |
| Hon David Gledson | Labor | Ipswich | 1915–1929, 1932–1949 |
| Fred Graham | Labor | Mackay | 1943–1969 |
| Bill Gunn | Labor | Wynnum | 1944–1966 |
| Hon Ned Hanlon | Labor | Ithaca | 1926–1952 |
| Hon Ted Hanson | Labor | Buranda | 1924–1947 |
| John Hayes | Labor | Nundah | 1932–1947 |
| John Healy | Labor | Warwick | 1935–1947 |
| Thomas Hiley | QPP | Logan | 1944–1966 |
| Paul Hilton | Labor | Carnarvon | 1935–1963 |
| Walter Ingram | Labor | Keppel | 1944–1952 |
| Cecil Jesson | Labor | Kennedy | 1935–1960 |
| Hon Arthur Jones | Labor | Charters Towers | 1929–1932, 1939–1960 |
| Tom Kerr | QPP | Oxley | 1943–1956 |
| George Keyatta | Labor | Townsville | 1939–1960 |
| Hon James Larcombe | Labor | Rockhampton | 1912–1929, 1932–1956 |
| Louis Luckins | Independent/QPP | Maree | 1941–1953 |
| Duncan MacDonald | Country | Stanley | 1938–1953 |
| Malcolm McIntyre | Country | Cunningham | 1944–1953 |
| Ted Maher | Country | West Moreton | 1929–1949 |
| Johnno Mann | Labor | Brisbane | 1936–1969 |
| George Marriott | Ind. Labor | Bulimba | 1938–1950 |
| Bill Moore | Labor | Merthyr | 1940–1957 |
| Kenneth Morris | QPP | Enoggera | 1944–1963 |
| Alf Muller | Country | Fassifern | 1935–1969 |
| Frank Nicklin | Country | Murrumba | 1932–1968 |
| Harry O'Shea | Labor | Warrego | 1941–1950 |
| Fred Paterson | Communist | Bowen | 1944–1950 |
| Bruce Pie | QPP | Windsor | 1941–1943, 1944–1951 |
| Tom Plunkett | Country | Albert | 1929–1957 |
| Bill Power | Labor | Baroona | 1935–1960 |
| Aubrey Slessar | Labor | Dalby | 1938–1947 |
| Norm Smith | Labor | Carpentaria | 1941–1960 |
| Jim Sparkes | Country | Aubigny | 1932–1935, 1941–1960 |
| John Taylor | Labor | Maranoa | 1944–1957 |
| Stephen Theodore | Labor | Herbert | 1940–1950 |
| Bert Turner | Labor | Kelvin Grove | 1941–1957 |
| Harry Walker | Country | Cooroora | 1907–1947 |
| Hon Ted Walsh | Labor | Mirani | 1935–1947, 1950–1969 |
| Charles Wanstall | QPP | Toowong | 1944–1950 |
| Hon Tommy Williams | Labor | Port Curtis | 1932–1947 |
| Les Wood^{[1]} | Labor | East Toowoomba | 1946–1947, 1950–1958 |
| Herbert Yeates^{[1]} | Country | East Toowoomba | 1938–1945 |

^{1} On 24 December 1945, the Country member for East Toowoomba, Herbert Yeates, died. Labor candidate Les Wood won the resulting by-election on 2 March 1946.
^{2} On 12 March 1946, the Labor member for Bremer and Premier of Queensland, Frank Cooper, retired. Labor candidate Jim Donald won the resulting by-election on 10 September 1946.
^{3} On 30 December 1946, the Country member for Wide Bay, Harry Clayton, died. No by-election was held due to the proximity of the 1947 state election.

== See also ==
- 1944 Queensland state election
- Cooper Ministry (Labor) (1942–1946)
- Hanlon Ministry (Labor) (1946–1952)
