= 1944 Queensland state election =

← 1941	15 April 1944	1947 →

All 62 seats in the Legislative Assembly of Queensland 32 seats needed for a majority
- Registered: 655,984 ▲3.3%
- Turnout: 78.17% (▼6.44)
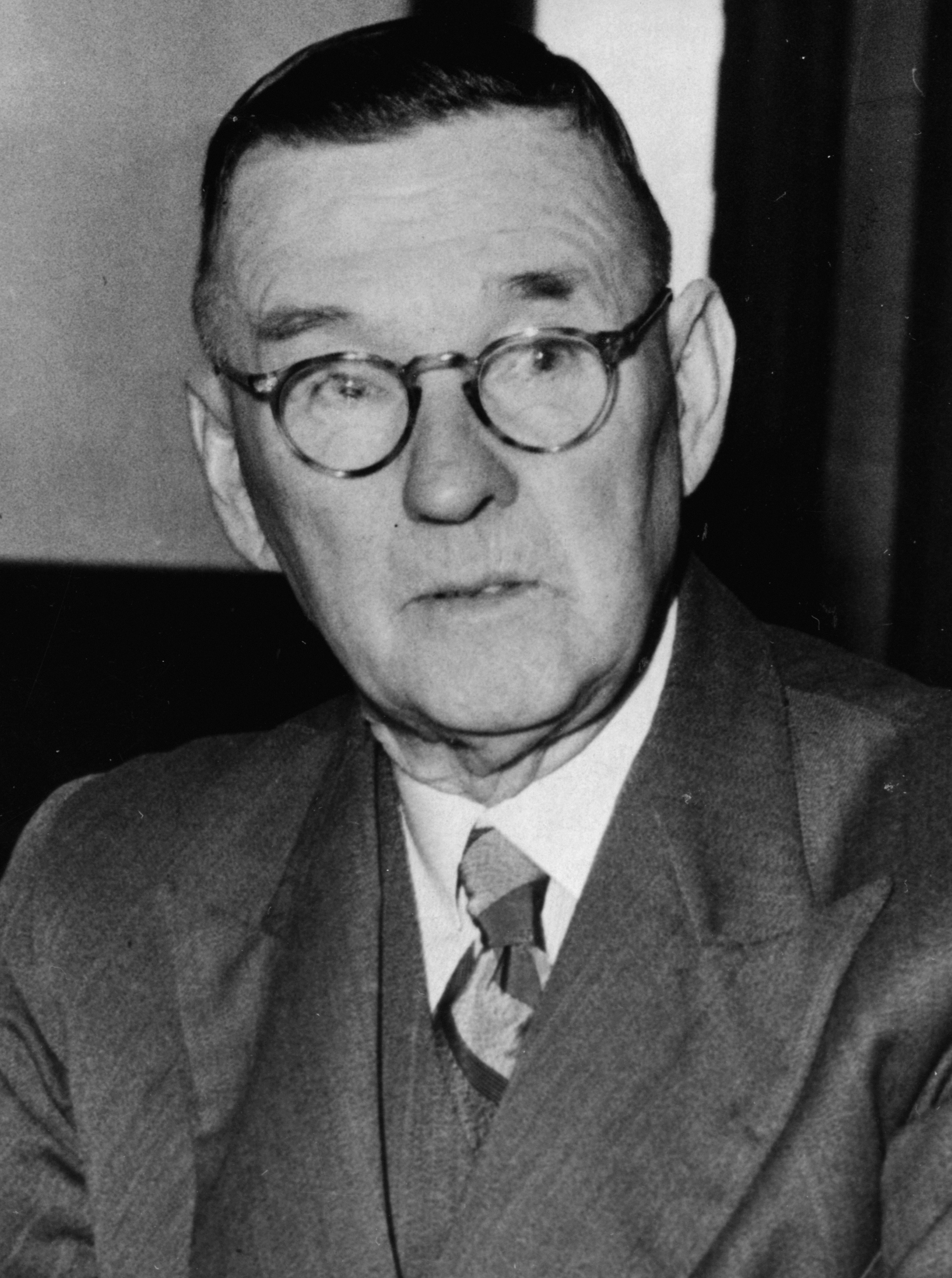

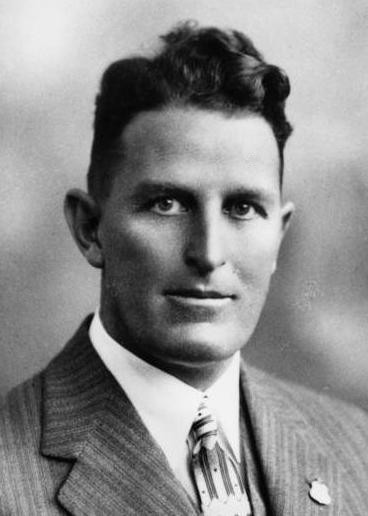

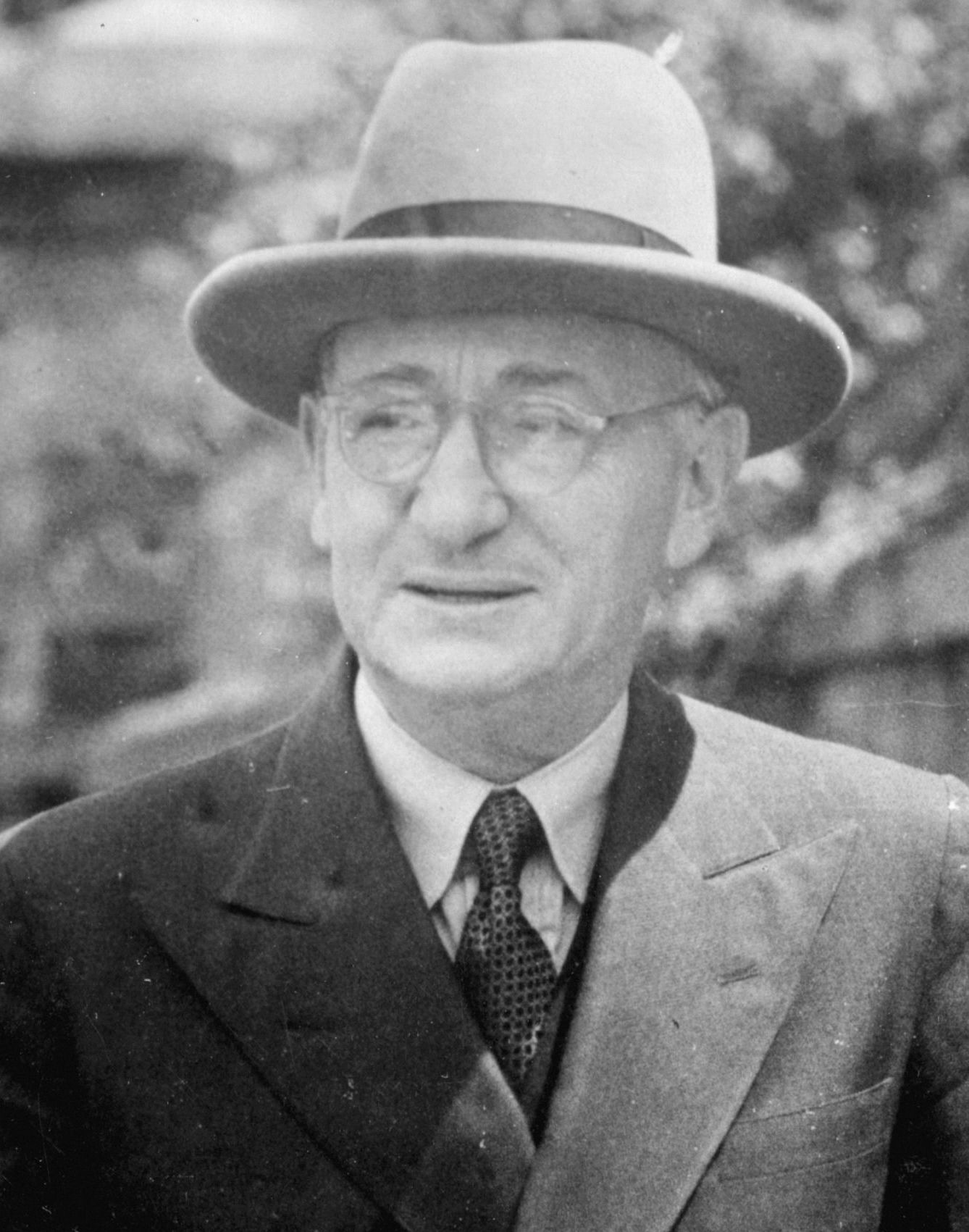

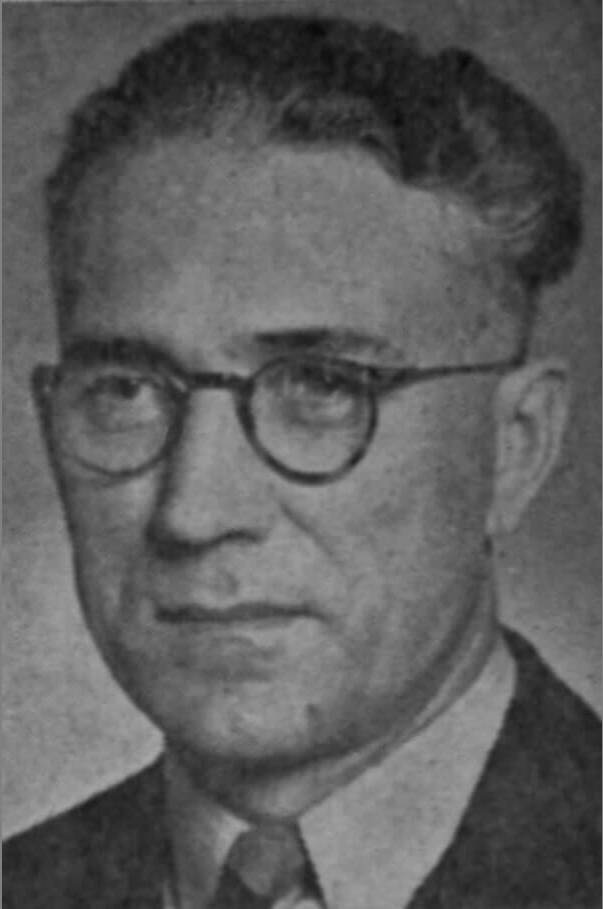

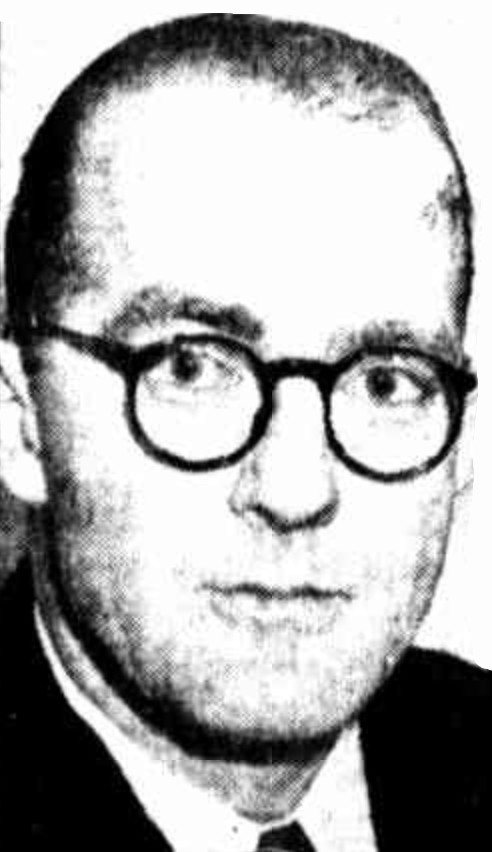

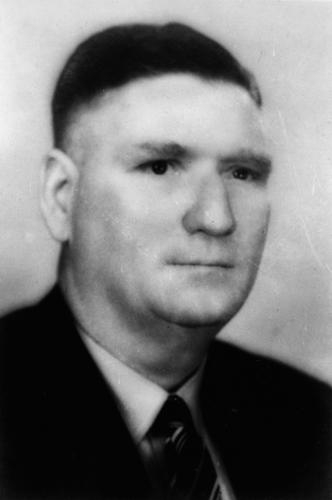
	First party	Second party	Third party
Leader	Frank Arthur Cooper	Frank Nicklin	J. B. Chandler
Party	Labor	Country	People's
Leader since	9 September 1942	18 June 1941	27 October 1943
Leader's seat	Bremer	Murrumba	Hamilton
Last election	41 seats	14 seats	Did not exist
Seats before	40 (Note: King O'Malley Labor gained Cairns from Labor at a by-election in 1942.)	18 (Note: Seats of both the Country Party and the United Australia Party. Both parties merged in April 1941, following the fourth election loss in a row for the Country Party and the Non-Labor opposition.)	1
Seats won	38	12	7
Seat change	▼2	▼6	▲6
Popular vote	237,042	88,608	124,573
Percentage	46.23%	17.28%	24.29%
Swing	▼3.51	▼2.93	▲24.29
	Fourth party	Fifth party	Sixth party
Leader	Jack Henry	Lou Barnes	Tom Aikens
Party	Communist	O'Malley Labor	Hermit Park Labor
Leader since	3 April 1937	1942	1944
Leader's seat	None	Cairns	Mundingburra (won seat)
Last election	0 seats	Did not exist	Did not exist
Seats before	0	1	0
Seats won	1	1	1
Seat change	▲1	Steady	Steady
Popular vote	12,467	5,790	5,790
Percentage	2.43%	1.13%	1.13%
Swing	▲1.43	▲1.13	▲1.13
Premier before election
Frank Arthur Cooper
Labor
Subsequent Premier
Frank Arthur Cooper
Labor

The 1944 Queensland state election was held on 15 April 1944 to elect all 62 members of the Legislative Assembly of Queensland. The Labor Party, led by premier Frank Cooper, was elected to a fifth term in office, albeit with a reduced majority.

Prior to the election, the electoral system was changed from contingency voting to first-past-the-post. The change was brought about by the state government three weeks after Labor lost the 1942 Cairns by-election, where it had led on primary votes but lost to King O'Malley Labor in the two-candidate-preferred count. First-past-the-post was in place for Queensland state elections until full preferential voting was introduced by the Country−Liberal coalition in 1963.

== Background ==
=== Key dates ===
Date	Event
23 February 1944	The Parliament was dissolved.
24 February 1944	Writs were issued by the Governor to proceed with an election.
3 March 1944	Close of nominations.
15 April 1944	Polling day, between the hours of 8am and 6pm.
27 April 1944	The Cooper Ministry was reconstituted.
29 May 1944	The writ was returned and the results formally declared.
1 August 1944	Parliament resumed for business.

=== Parties and independents ===
Some ructions had developed between some sections of the Labor Party and the party's AWU-dominated executive, resulting in tiny splinter movements which were, however, locally effective. The Hermit Park branch in Townsville, which had dominated the Townsville City Council since 1939, was expelled from the ALP for alleged disloyalty in 1942, possibly due to association with Communists. Tom Aikens won the seat of Mundingburra at the election. Similar forces saw sitting left-wing members George Taylor (Enoggera) and George Marriott (Bulimba) expelled from the party; the former lost his seat to a QPP candidate, while the latter retained his at the 1944 and 1947 elections. Frank Barnes, a colourful identity who supported social credit theories popular since the Great Depression and declared himself opposed to the Labor government, retained his seat of Bundaberg.

Various changes were taking place in conservative politics as well, with the dissolution of the United Australia Party and the formation of the Queensland People's Party (QPP), led by the mayor of Brisbane and member for Hamilton, John Beals Chandler. The two independent conservatives elected in 1941 were both out of parliament by the election — Bruce Pie had resigned to contest the 1943 federal election, whilst William Deacon had died. One of the former United Australia Party members, Louis Luckins (Maree), did not join the QPP originally and retained his seat in 1944 as an independent.

Apart from the above, numerous independent candidates contested with a range of banners, including Democrat, Christian Socialist, Servicemen's Association, People's Party and Independent Country Party, none of them achieving more than a few hundred votes.

Fred Paterson was elected in Bowen, the only member of the Communist Party of Australia to be elected to an Australian parliament.

== Results ==
Legislative Assembly (FPTP) – Turnout: 78.17%
Party	Primary vote			Seats	
Party	Votes	%	Swing (pp)	Seats	Change
Labor	237,042	46.23	–3.51	38 (Note: Includes George Marriott of Bulimba whom was listed as an Independent Labor candidate.)	▼3
People's Party	124,573	24.29	+24.29	7	▲7
Country	88,608	17.28	–2.93	12	▼6
Communist	12,467	2.43	+1.43	1	▲1
King O'Malley Labor	5,790	1.13	+1.13	1	▲1
Hermit Park Labor	5,521	1.08	+1.08	1	▲1
Frank Barnes Labor	4,180	0.82	–0.2	1	Steady
Democratic	999	0.19	-1.75	0	▼2
All Services Association of Australia	325	0.06	+0.06	0	Steady
Christian Socialist	230	0.04	+0.04	0	Steady
Independent	23,680	4.62	+0.55	1	▲1
Total	512,768	100.00		62	Steady
Invalid/blank votes	9,352	1.82	–0.29	—	
Turnout	512,768	78.17	–6.44	—	
Registered voters	655,984	—		—	

Popular vote
Labor	46.23%
People's Party	24.29%
Country National	17.28%
Communist	2.43%
King O'Malley Labor	1.13%
Hermit Park Labor	1.08%
Andrew Fisher Labor	0.82%
Democratic	0.19%
ASAA	0.06%
Christian Socialist	0.04%
Independents	4.62%

Seats
Labor	61.29%
People's Party	11.29%
Country National	19.35%
Communist	1.61%
King O'Malley Labor	1.61%
Hermit Park Labor	1.61%
Andrew Fisher Labor	1.61%

== Seats changing hands ==
This table lists changes in party representation at the 1944 election.

Seat	Incumbent member	Party	New member	Party
Bowen	Ernest Riordan	Labor	Fred Paterson	Communist
Bulimba	George Marriott	Labor	George Marriott	Independent Labor
Cunningham	William Deacon*	Independent Country	Malcolm McIntyre	Country
Enoggera	George Taylor	Independent Labor	Kenneth Morris	People's Party
Keppel	David Daniel	Country	Walter Ingram	Labor
Logan	John Brown	Labor	Thomas Hiley	People's Party
Maree	Louis Luckins	People's Party	Louis Luckins	Independent
Mundingburra	John Dash	Labor	Tom Aikens	Hermit Park Labor
Sandgate	Eric Decker	Country	Eric Decker	People's Party
Windsor	Harry Moorhouse	Independent Democrat	Bruce Pie	People's Party
Wynnum	Bill Dart	Independent	Bill Gunn	Labor

- Members listed in italics did not recontest their seats.
- The sitting Independent Country member for Cunningham, William Deacon died in 1943. No by-election was held due to the proximity of the state election.
- In addition, Frank Barnes Labor held the seat of Cairns, which it had won from Labor at the 1942 by-election.

== See also ==
- Members of the Queensland Legislative Assembly, 1944–1947
- Cooper Ministry
