= 1947 Queensland state election =

← 1944	3 May 1947	1950 →

All 62 seats in the Legislative Assembly 32 seats are needed for a majority
- Registered: 697,405 ▲6.3%
- Turnout: 632,909 (90.75%) (▲12.58pp)
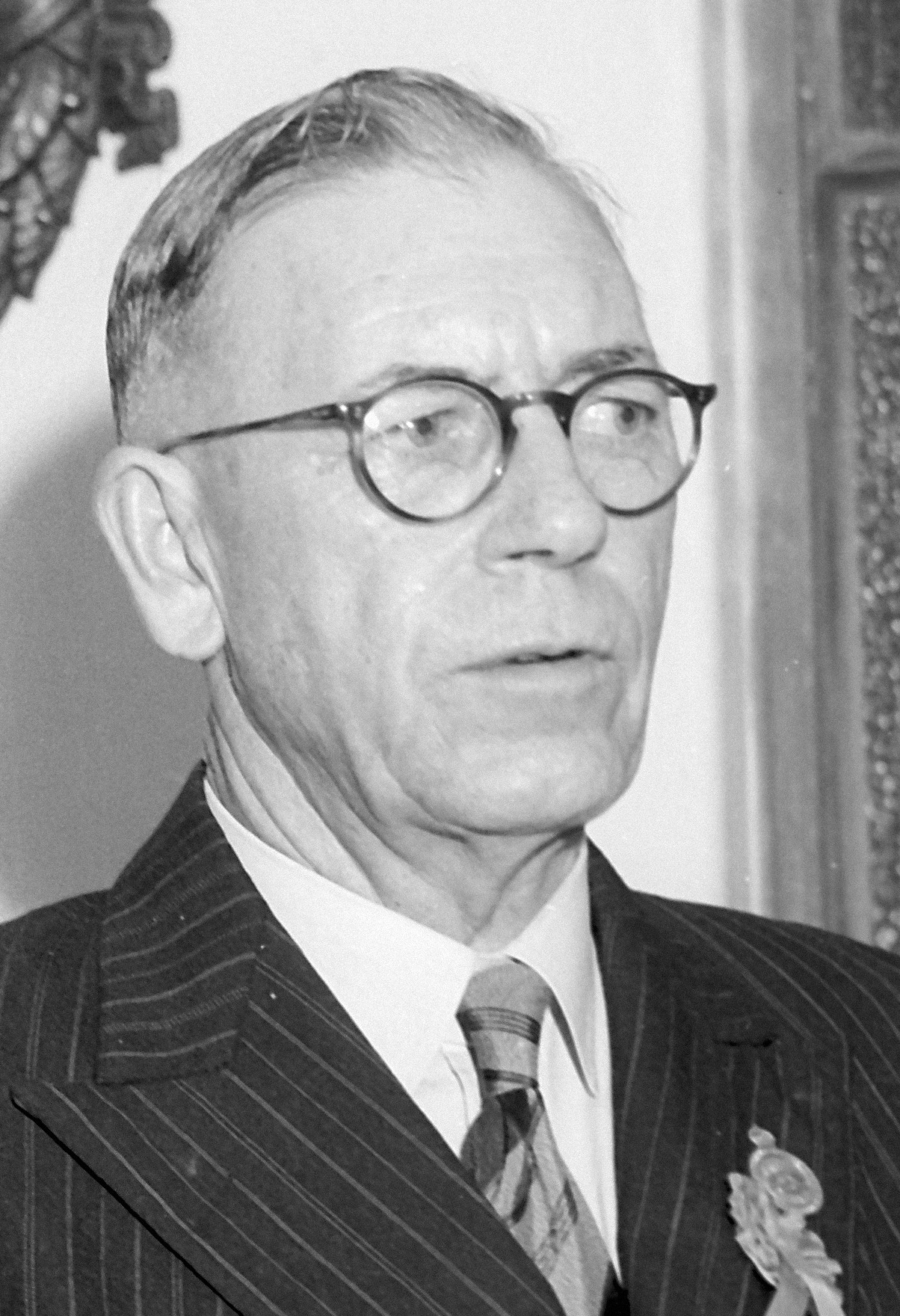

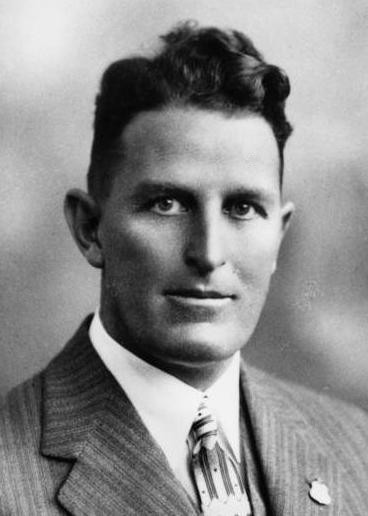

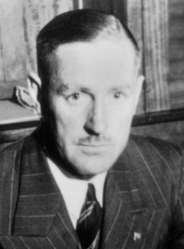

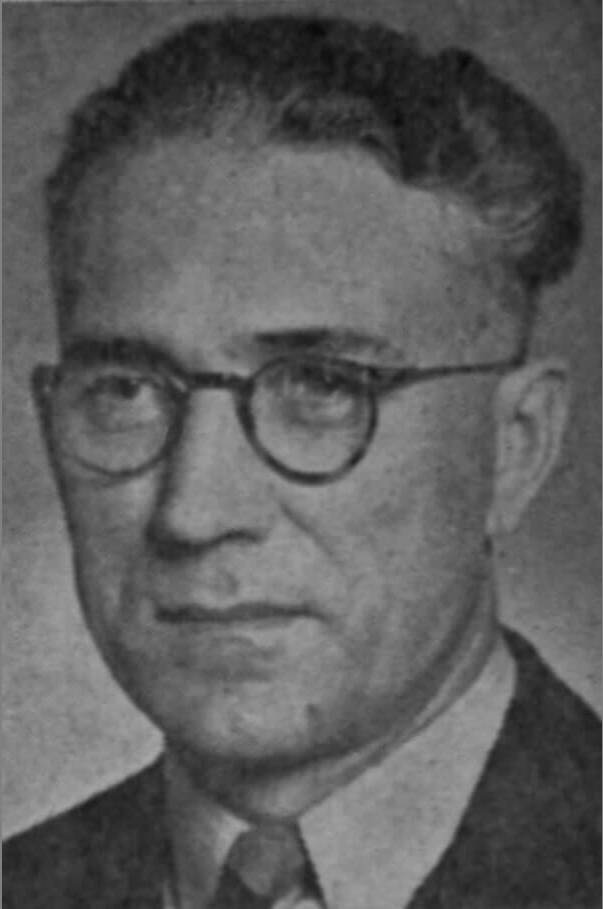
	First party	Second party
Leader	Ned Hanlon	Frank Nicklin
Party	Labor	Country
Leader since	7 March 1946	21 May 1941
Leader's seat	Ithaca	Murrumba
Last election	38 seats, 46.23%	12 seats, 17.28%
Seats before	39 seats (Note: Following the death of Country MP for East Toowoomba, Herbert Yeates, in 1945, a by-election was held in March of the following year. Approximately 1 year and 62 days out from the next state election, the seat was won by Labor candidate Les Wood by less than two-hundred votes.)	11 seats
Seats won	35	14
Seat change	▼4	▲3
Popular vote	272,203	129,158
Percentage	43.00%	20.40%
Swing	▼3.23	▲3.12
	Third party	Fourth party
Leader	Bruce Pie	Jack Henry
Party	People's Party	Communist
Leader since	8 March 1946	March 1937
Leader's seat	Windsor
Last election	7 seats, 24.29%	1 seat, 2.43%
Seats before	7 seats	1 seat
Seats won	9	1
Seat change	▲2	Steady
Popular vote	160,623	7,870
Percentage	25.38%	1.24
Swing	▲1.09	▼1.19
- Legislative Assembly after the election
Premier before election
Frank Arthur Cooper
Labor
Elected Premier
Ned Hanlon
Labor

Elections were held in the Australian state of Queensland on 3 May 1947 to elect the 62 members of the state's Legislative Assembly.

The election was the first that the Labor government had contested under Premier Ned Hanlon, who had been in office for 14 months by the time of the poll.

The election resulted in Labor receiving a sixth term in office. It was the first Queensland election at which all seats were contested by at least two candidates.

== Key dates ==
Date	Event
21 March 1947	The Parliament was dissolved.
24 March 1947	Writs were issued by the Governor to proceed with an election.
31 March 1947	Close of nominations.
3 May 1947	Polling day, between the hours of 8am and 6pm.
15 May 1947	The Hanlon Ministry was re-sworn in.
24 May 1947	Polling day in the seat of Gregory.
30 May 1947	The writ was returned and the results formally declared.
2 June 1947	Polling day in the seat of Cook.
5 August 1947	Parliament resumed for business.

== Results ==
Legislative Assembly (IRV) – Turnout: 90.75%
Party	Primary vote			Seats	
Party	Votes	%	Swing (pp)	Seats	Change
Labor	272,203	43.00	–3.23	35	▼4
Country	129,158 (Note: Includes Independent Country candidates for Cooroora and Nanango.)	20.40	+3.12	14	▲3
People's Party	160,623	25.38	+1.09	9	▲2
Frank Barnes Labor	21,823	3.45	+2.63	1	▲1
Communist	7,870	1.24	–1.19	1	Steady
Independent Labor	6,727	1.06	+1.06	1	▲1
Hermit Park Labor	4,541	0.72	–0.36	1	Steady
King O'Malley Labor	3,061	0.48	–0.65	0	Steady
Co-operative Democrat	702 (Note: Includes a candidate running as a "Democrat".)	0.11	+0.08	0	Steady
Independent	17,722	2.80	–1.82	0	▼1
Total	632,909	100.00		62	Steady
Invalid/blank votes	8,579	1.4	–0.42	—	
Turnout	632,909	90.75	+12.58	—	
Registered voters	697,405	—		—	

Popular vote
Labor	43.58%
People's Party	25.73%
Country	19.49%
Frank Barnes Labor	3.97%
Communist	1.26%
Hermit Park Labor	0.73%
Independents	5.24%

Seats
Labor	56.45%
Country	22.58%
People's Party	14.52%
Frank Barnes Labor	1.61%
Communist	1.61%
Hermit Park Labor	1.61%
Independents	1.61%

== Seats changing party representation ==
This table lists changes in party representation at the 1947 election.

Seat	Incumbent member	Party	New member	Party
Cairns	Lou Barnes	Frank Barnes Labor	Thomas Crowley	Labor
Dalby	Aubrey Slessar	Labor	Charles Russell	Country
East Toowoomba	Les Wood	Labor	Gordon Chalk	People's Party
Maree	Louis Luckins	Independent	Louis Luckins	People's Party
Mirani	Ted Walsh	Labor	Ernie Evans	Country
Warwick	John Healy	Labor	Otto Madsen	Country

- Members listed in italics did not recontest their seats.
- East Toowoomba was held by the Country Party at the previous election. It was won by Labor at the 1946 by-election.

== See also ==
- Members of the Queensland Legislative Assembly, 1944–1947
- Members of the Queensland Legislative Assembly, 1947–1950
- Candidates of the Queensland state election, 1947
- Hanlon Ministry
