= Ray Jones (Queensland politician) =

Australian politician

Ray Jones BEM

Member of the Queensland Legislative Assembly for Cairns
- In office 27 February 1965 – 22 October 1983
- Preceded by: Watty Wallace
- Succeeded by: Keith De Lacy

Personal details
- Born: Raymond Jones; 3 February 1926 Cairns, Queensland, Australia
- Died: 22 April 2000 (aged 74) Cairns, Queensland, Australia
- Party: Labor
- Spouse: Fay Hazel Brown (m.1949 d.2008)
- Occupation: Queensland Railways

Raymond Jones (3 February 1926 – 22 April 2000) was a member of the Queensland Legislative Assembly.

== Biography ==
Jones was born in Cairns, Queensland, the son of David Jones and his wife Dorothy Edith (née Soilleux). He was educated at Parramatta State School and St Augustines College, both in Cairns. He joined the 51st Battalion Regiment Cadets in 1940 serving with them for a year and in 1942 he was a member of the Volunteer Defence Corps for a year. From 1943 until 1945 he was an air crew trainee with the RAAF. After the war he worked for the Queensland Railways as a porter, shunter and guard.

On 15 October 1949 Jones married Fay Hazel Brown (died 2008) and together had two sons and a daughter. He died in April 2000 and was buried in the Martyn Street Cemetery.

== Public career ==
Jones started out in politics as an alderman on the Cairns City Council from 1964 to 1965. When the member for Cairns, Watty Wallace, died in 1964, Jones won the subsequent by-election held in February the next year. He went on to represent the electorate for over 18 years before retiring in 1983.

Although he was always in opposition during his state political career, Jones held several roles:

- Opposition spokesman on Aboriginal Advancement 1974–1977
- Opposition Whip 1977–1981
- Member of the Parliamentary Building Committee 1966–1968
- Temporary Chairman of Committees 1969–1970
- Shadow Minister for Transport and Road Safety 1970–1977
- Member of the Parliamentary Printing Committee 1974–1977
- Member of the Parliamentary Delegation to South-East Asia 1974
- Alternate Delegate to the Australian Constitutional Convention in Perth 1978
- Member of the Select Committee of Privileges 1978
- Shadow Minister for Maritime Services and Tourism 1977

Parliament of Queensland
| Preceded by Watty Wallace | Member for Cairns; 1965–1983 | Succeeded by Keith De Lacy |
