= Watty Wallace =

Australian politician

Member of the Queensland Legislative Assembly for Cairns
- In office 19 May 1956 – 12 October 1964
- Preceded by: Thomas Crowley
- Succeeded by: Ray Jones

Personal details
- Born: George Walter Gordon Wallace; 16 January 1900 Queensland, Australia
- Died: 12 October 1964 (aged 64) Cairns, Queensland, Australia
- Party: Labor
- Spouse(s): Lilian May Clark (m.1920 d.1936), Alice May Kiefel (m.1937 d.1977)
- Children: Walter Gordon Wallace (b.1921 d.2020)
- Occupation: Meatworker

George Walter Gordon Wallace (16 January 1900 - 12 October 1964) was a member of the Queensland Legislative Assembly.

== Biography ==
Wallace was born in Queensland, the son of Charles Wallace and his wife Minnie (née Collins). He was educated at the Mareeba and Chillagoe primary schools before joining the First Australian Imperial Force in 1916. He had put his age up by two years in order to enlist and saw action in France and Belgium with the 7th and 21st Machine Gun Companies. On his return to Australia he joined the meat industry, working in both Cairns and Gordonvale as a slaughterman and butcher.

On 7 December 1920 Wallace married Lillian May Clark and together had one son, Walter Gordon Wallace. Lillian died in 1936 and the next year Wallace married Alice May Kiefel (died 1977). He died in October 1964 and was buried in the Martyn Street Cemetery in Cairns.

== Public career ==
Wallace started out in politics as an alderman on the Cairns City Council from 1949 to 1956 and a member of the Cairns Harbour Board from 1952 until 1956. At the 1956 Queensland state election he won the seat of Cairns for the Labor Party, taking over the seat from the retiring member, Thomas Crowley. He represented the electorate until his death in 1964.

Parliament of Queensland
Preceded by Thomas Crowley	Member for Cairns; 1956–1964	Succeeded by Ray Jones
