= Gavin King =

Australian politician

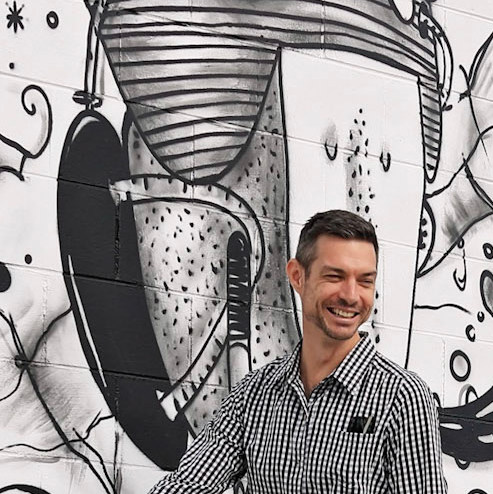
- King in August 2014

Member of the Queensland Parliament for Cairns
- In office 24 March 2012 – 31 January 2015
- Preceded by: Desley Boyle
- Succeeded by: Rob Pyne

Personal details
- Party: Liberal National
- Occupation: Journalist

Gavin Ryan King (born 17 March 1979) is an Australian journalist, founder of news site TropicNow and author. He was also previously a politician, serving as a Liberal National Party member of the Legislative Assembly of Queensland from 2012 to 2015, representing the electorate of Cairns. He served as Assistant Minister for Tourism in the Newman Ministry from 2012 to 2015. He was previously known for being a chief of staff and opinion columnist for News Corporation.

== Early life ==
Born in Cessnock, New South Wales, King launched his first publishing venture Raptanite at age 15, a monthly magazine sold across Australia to promote urban music.

== Career ==
After graduating from secondary school, King moved to Sydney to work in investment banking before being appointed assistant editor and later editor of Revolver magazine, a free weekly street press newspaper focusing on music, art and culture.

In 2003, as Papunya's youth co-ordinator, King was involved in opening a music recording studio which was hoped to deter young people from petrol sniffing.

In late 2003, he began as political correspondent for The Centralian Advocate, where he won a distinction award in the Northern Territory Press Club awards in 2005. He was promoted to business editor at sister publication The Cairns Post in 2006 and promoted as chief of staff in December 2007.

In 2005, King was briefly detained and questioned by Australian Federal Police for his coverage of anti-war protesters Christians Against All Terrorism, who broke into the Pine Gap defence base near Alice Springs. King's camera was confiscated by police.

In 2006, he was promoted to business editor at The Cairns Post, and later became chief of staff and editor-at-large at the newspaper.

In 2011, he resigned from his position as editor-at-large to run for the state seat of Cairns in the 2012 Queensland election, which he went on to win, becoming the first conservative politician to win the seat since it was established in 1904.

In November 2011 King received criticism for writing an article suggesting that women who drink to excess are partly to blame if they are raped or assaulted.

In 2015, King launched online news site TropicNow, and wrote the biography of former Queensland premier Campbell Newman.

In 2021, King was named as the host of a new current affairs radio program called The King Review on 4CA 846.

== See also ==
- List of newspaper columnists

Parliament of Queensland
Preceded by Desley Boyle	Member for Cairns; 2012–2015	Succeeded by Rob Pyne
