= Michael Healy (politician) =

Australian politician

Michael Healy MLA

Member of the Queensland Legislative Assembly for Cairns
- Incumbent
- Assumed office 25 November 2017
- Preceded by: Rob Pyne

Personal details
- Born: 3 August 1964 (age 61) St Ives, Sydney, New South Wales
- Party: Labor
- Website: www.michaelhealy.com.au

Michael Patrick Thomas Healy (born 3 August 1964) is an Australian politician. He has been the Labor member for Cairns in the Queensland Legislative Assembly since 2017.

Parliament of Queensland
| Preceded by Rob Pyne | Member for Cairns; 2017–present | Incumbent |
