= Rob Pyne =

Australian politician

Councillor Rob Pyne
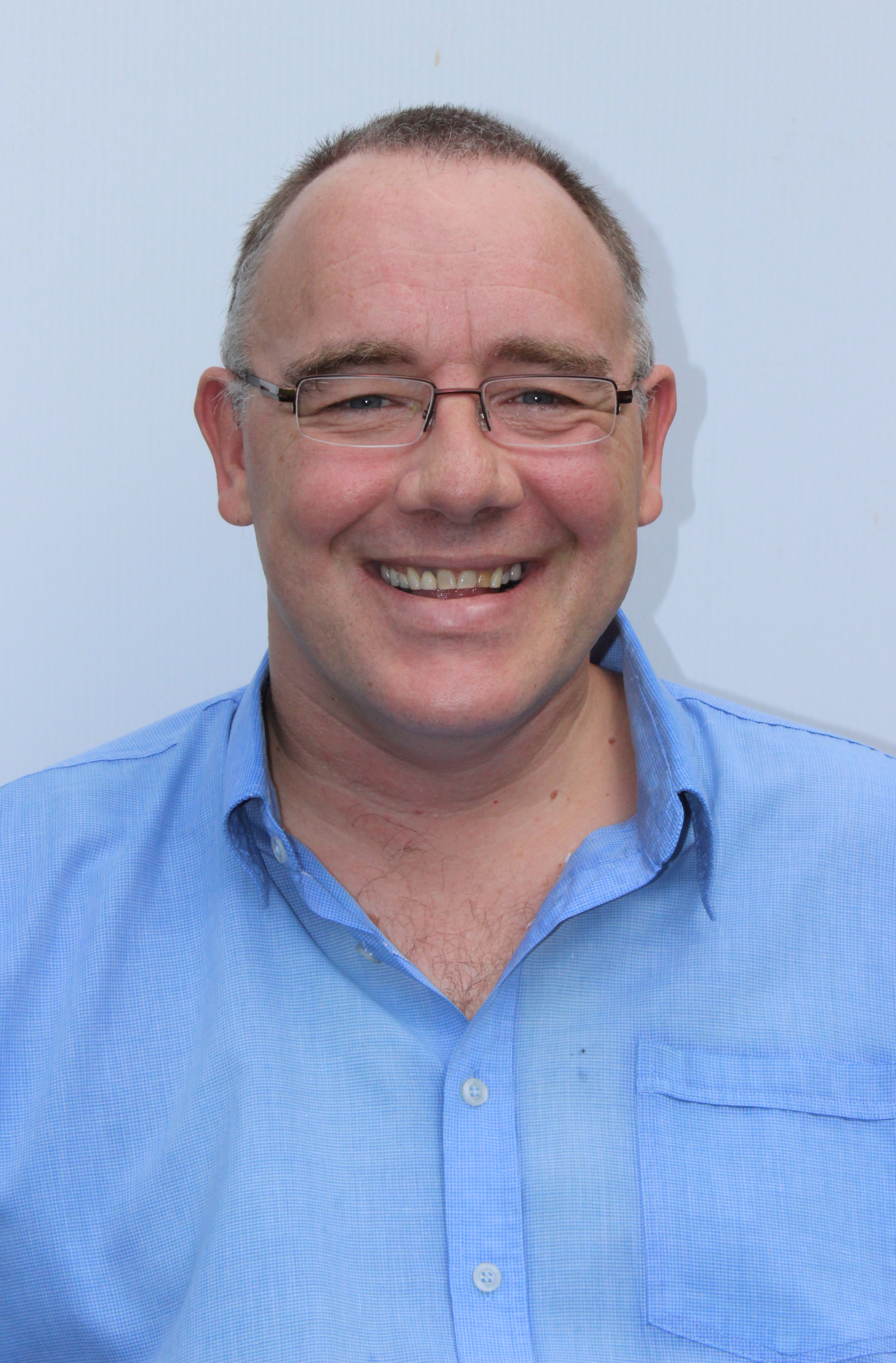

Councillor of the Cairns Region for Division 5
- Incumbent
- Assumed office 16 March 2024
- Preceded by: Amy Eden

Councillor of the Cairns Region for Division 2
- In office 28 March 2020 – 16 March 2024
- Preceded by: John Shilling
- Succeeded by: Matthew Tickner

Member of the Queensland Legislative Assembly for Cairns
- In office 31 January 2015 – 25 November 2017
- Preceded by: Gavin King
- Succeeded by: Michael Healy

Councillor of the Cairns Region for Division 3
- In office 25 March 2008 – 31 January 2015
- Preceded by: Jeff Pezzutti
- Succeeded by: Cathy Zeiger

Personal details
- Born: Robert John; 23 April 1967 (age 59) Gordonvale, Queensland, Australia
- Party: QLD Socialists
- Other political affiliations: Labor (until 2016); Independent (2016–2020); Socialist Alliance (2020–2024)
- Spouse: Jenny Pyne
- Children: 1
- Parent: Tom Pyne (father)
- Education: James Cook University (BA); Queensland University of Technology (LLB)
- Occupation: disability advocate; politician
- Website: robpyne.com.au

Robert John Pyne (born 23 April 1967) is an Australian politician who currently serves as a member of Cairns Regional Council, representing Division 5. He was previously a member of the Legislative Assembly of Queensland from 2015 until 2017, representing the electorate of Cairns.

Pyne was elected to parliament as a member of the Australian Labor Party, but resigned to sit as an independent in March 2016. He contested the 2017 election as an independent candidate, but lost his seat to Labor candidate Michael Healy.

He is the first quadriplegic member of any parliament of Australia.

== Early life ==
Pyne was born in Gordonvale, the son of former Cairns mayor Tom Pyne, and raised in the suburb of Edmonton. He had a spinal cord injury in December 1991 through breaking his neck diving into shallow water when he was 23 years old, which resulted in him becoming quadriplegic. He spent nine months recovering in the Princess Alexandra Hospital's Spinal Unit in Brisbane before going on to gain a Bachelor of Arts with Honours in History and Politics from James Cook University in 1999 and a Bachelor of Laws degree from Queensland University of Technology in 2002. In 1997, he served as President of the James Cook University Student Association.

== Career ==
Before his accident, Rob worked for the Public Trustee of Queensland. After attaining his degrees he worked as Regional Disability Liaison Officer at James Cook University Cairns before becoming a politician. He first ran in 2008 as Division 3 councillor in the Cairns Regional Council elections, beating the former Deputy Mayor Terry James He inspected the Cairns Regional Council head office prior to taking up his role to ensure it was wheelchair accessible. He was re-elected in 2012. Division 3 includes the suburbs of Bayview Heights, Lamb Range, Mount Sheridan, White Rock and Woree. In March 2014 a Local Government formal complaint was filed against him for breaching Cairns Regional Council's media policy rules.

In September 2013, he announced that he would contest Australian Labor Party preselection for the 2015 state election in the seat of Cairns, and in April 2014 he was nominated as the Labor candidate. He won the election in January 2015, defeating sitting Liberal National Party MP Gavin King.

In March 2015, Queensland's Parliament building underwent renovations to accommodate its first quadriplegic member of parliament, including removing two seats and desks in the chamber to allow Pyne wheelchair access.

In January 2016, Pyne resigned from the Labor Party's left faction. On 7 March 2016, after being publicly critical of a number of government decisions, Pyne resigned from the Labor Party, saying that he was "no longer prepared to be told how to vote by someone from Brisbane". He moved to the crossbench to sit as an independent member. However, he stated he would continue to back Labor on confidence and supply matters.

On 5 May 2016, Pyne submitted a private members bill to the Queensland Parliament to decriminalise abortion in Queensland. In February 2017, he withdrew the bill after it became apparent it would not get sufficient support in its present form in Parliament. The issue of abortion was referred to the Queensland Law Reform Commission to consider a new framework for legislation in relation to the termination of pregnancy. On 19 June 2017, the Queensland Attorney-General Yvettte D'Ath officially issued the Queensland Law Reform Commission with the terms of reference for a review and investigation into modernising Queensland's laws in relation to the termination of pregnancy.

In 2020, after returning to Cairns Regional Council at the local government elections, Pyne joined Socialist Alliance.

Pyne later became a founding member of Queensland Socialists, while also advocating support for the Australian Greens.

== Personal life ==
His father Tom Pyne was an Australian politician from 1961 until 2000. He was first elected to Mulgrave Shire Council in 1961 and served as deputy-chairman of Mulgrave Shire in 1976, chairman in 1979, 1982, 1983, 1988 and 1991 and elected Mayor of Cairns City Council in 1995. He died in October 2011.

Rob Pyne lives in Cairns. His wife Jenny died from a heart attack in July 2022. He has a daughter, Kate.

Parliament of Queensland
Preceded by Gavin King	Member for Cairns; 2015–2017	Succeeded by Michael Healy
