= Keith De Lacy =

Australian politician (1940–2021)

The Honourable Keith De Lacy AM

41st Treasurer of Queensland
- In office 7 December 1989 – 19 February 1996
- Premier: Wayne Goss
- Preceded by: Russell Cooper
- Succeeded by: Joan Sheldon

Minister for Regional Development
- In office 7 December 1989 – 12 November 1990
- Premier: Wayne Goss
- Preceded by: Bob Katter
- Succeeded by: Geoff Smith

Shadow Minister for Finance and Regional Development
- In office 2 March 1988 – 7 December 1989
- Leader: Wayne Goss
- Succeeded by: Len Stephan

Shadow Minister for Primary Industries
- In office Nov 1986 – 2 March 1988
- Leader: Nev Warburton
- Succeeded by: Ed Casey

Member of the Queensland Legislative Assembly for Cairns
- In office 22 October 1983 – 13 June 1998
- Preceded by: Ray Jones
- Succeeded by: Desley Boyle

Personal details
- Born: Keith Ernest De Lacy; 7 August 1940 Cairns, Queensland, Australia
- Died: 26 November 2021 (aged 81) Brisbane, Queensland
- Party: Labor
- Education: University of Queensland
- Occupation: Newsagency proprietor, Underground miner, College principal, Tobacco farmer

Keith Ernest De Lacy, AM (7 August 1940 – 26 November 2021) was an Australian politician and businessman.

== Early life ==
De Lacy was born in Cairns and grew up on a tobacco farm in the Mareeba/Dimbulah district. He received a Diploma of Agriculture from Gatton College and then a Bachelor of Arts from the University of Queensland as a mature age correspondence student. He held various jobs, including as an underground miner, tobacco farmer, College Principal in PNG, newsagency proprietor, as well as serving in the Citizen Military Forces from 1958 to 1959.

== Political career ==
In 1970 De Lacy joined the Labor's Cairns branch, and in 1983 he was elected to the Queensland Legislative Assembly as the member for Cairns. In 1986 he became Opposition Spokesman on Primary Industries, moving to Finance and Regional Development in 1988. Following Labor's victory at the 1989 state election, De Lacy became Treasurer and Minister for Regional Development. He retired from the Regional Development portfolio in 1990 but remained Treasurer until the government's resignation in 1996. De Lacy retired in 1998.

== Post politics ==
After politics De Lacy went on to a wide range of directorships. He was Chair of Ergon Energy from 1999 to 2004, a Director of both the Queensland Investment Corporation and the Securities Exchange Guarantee Corporation, a subsidiary of the ASX. As chair he took three companies through IPOs on the ASX. Macarthur Coal listed in June 2001 with a market cap of $128 million and was taken over by Peabody Energy in 2011 for $4.9 billion. The other two were property management companies, Trinity Group and CEC Group, both of which suffered from the property market collapse following the GFC and were eventually de-listed. He was also Chairman of Queensland Sugar Ltd, from 2000 to 2004 and the Global Sugar Alliance, a group of sugar exporting nations seeking a fairer deal for sugar on global markets. He was also Chair of Australia's largest irrigated farm the Cubbie Group which went into voluntary administration towards the end of the Millennium Drought after three years of non production. He was Chair of COFCO Australia when it made a successful take-over bid for Tully Sugar.

Keith De Lacy was President of the Queensland Division of the Australian Institute of Company Directors (AICD) from 2010 to 2014 and on the national Board of the AICD during this same period. He was a Director of oil shale company Queensland Energy Resources from 2009 to 2014, and Chairman of Nimrod Resources, and remained a Director of the Reef Casino Trust in Cairns. He has chaired many not-for-profits and remained on the advisory Board of both Queensland Leaders and the Graduate School of Management at Queensland University of Technology.

For services to Queensland, De Lacy was appointed a Member of the Order of Australia (AM), the Centenary Medal, the University of Queensland Gold Medal, and honorary Doctorates from both James Cook and Central Queensland Universities.

His book Blood Stains the Wattle was published in 2002.

De Lacy died from cancer on 26 November 2021 at the age of 81 in Brisbane.

Parliament of Queensland
Preceded by Ray Jones	Member for Cairns; 1983–1998	Succeeded by Desley Boyle
