= 1949 Ipswich state by-election =

The 1949 Ipswich state by-election was a by-election held on 10 September 1949 for the Queensland Legislative Assembly seat of Ipswich, based in the centre of Ipswich to the south-west of Brisbane. At the time of the election, the seat included the suburbs of Ipswich, Booval, Bundamba, Newtown, Silkstone, West Ipswich, Woodend and part of East Ipswich.

The by-election was triggered by the death of Labor member and Attorney-General of Queensland David Gledson on 14 May 1949. Gledson had held the seat since the 1915 election, with one brief interruption during the Great Depression. It was expected to be retained by the party.

== Timeline ==
Date	Event
14 May 1949	David Gledson died, vacating the seat of Ipswich.
22 August 1949	Writs were issued by the Speaker of the Legislative Assembly to proceed with a by-election.
29 August 1949	Close of nominations and draw of ballot papers.
10 September 1949	Polling day, between the hours of 8am and 6pm.
14 September 1949	The writ was returned and the results formally declared.

== Candidates ==
The by-election attracted three candidates. The Labor Party nominated Ivor Marsden, the Liberal Party nominated Graham Stephenson, while the Communist Party nominated Edmund Crisp. It was the first electoral contest held since the Queensland People's Party became the Liberal Party's Queensland branch, along with the Kurilpa state by-election held on the same day.

== Results ==
Ivor Marsden retained the seat for the Labor Party.

Ipswich state by-election, 1949
Party	Candidate	Votes	%	±%
Labor	Ivor Marsden	6,021	53.32	–8.61
Liberal	Graham Stephenson	4,906	43.45	+5.39
Communist	Edmund Crisp	364	3.22	+3.22
Total formal votes		11,311	99.36	+0.43
Informal votes		73	0.64	–0.43
Turnout		11,384	92.77	+1.33
Labor hold		Swing	–8.61	

== Aftermath ==
Ivor Marsden held the seat and its successor, Ipswich West, until his retirement from politics at the 1966 election.

== See also ==
- List of Queensland state by-elections
