= 1949 Kurilpa state by-election =

The 1949 Kurilpa state by-election was a by-election held on 10 September 1949 for the Queensland Legislative Assembly seat of Kurilpa, based in the inner southern Brisbane suburbs of West End and South Brisbane.

The by-election was triggered by the death of Labor member Patrick Copley on 18 July 1949. The seat was a swinging seat between Labor and non-Labor, although Copley had held it since the 1932 election and it was expected to be retained by the party.

== Timeline ==
Date	Event
18 July 1949	Thomas Copley died, vacating the seat of Kurilpa.
22 August 1949	Writs were issued by the Speaker of the Legislative Assembly to proceed with a by-election.
29 August 1949	Close of nominations and draw of ballot papers.
10 September 1949	Polling day, between the hours of 8am and 6pm.
14 September 1949	The writ was returned and the results formally declared.

== Candidates ==
The by-election attracted three candidates. The Labor Party nominated Thomas Moores, the incumbent alderman for the Kurilpa Ward on Brisbane City Council whose boundaries were identical to the Assembly seat. The Liberal Party nominated Norman Brandon, while the Communist Party nominated Anna Slater. It was the first electoral contest held since the Queensland People's Party became the Liberal Party's Queensland branch, along with the Ipswich state by-election held on the same day.

== Results ==
Thomas Moores retained the seat for the Labor Party.

Kurilpa state by-election, 1949
Party	Candidate	Votes	%	±%
Labor	Thomas Moores	5,197	53.56	+1.94
Liberal	Norman Brandon	4,274	44.04	–4.35
Communist	Anna Slater	232	2.39	+2.39
Total formal votes		9,703	98.63	+0.22
Informal votes		135	1.37	–0.22
Turnout		9,838	87.30	–2.73
Labor hold		Swing	+1.94	

== Aftermath ==
Upon Moores' election, the Kurilpa Ward council seat was filled at a by-election on 12 November 1949 by Colin Bennett, who went on to be the leader of Municipal Labor on Brisbane City Council during the 1950s, and subsequently held the Legislative Assembly seat of South Brisbane from 1960 until 1972.

Moores held Kurilpa until the 1957 state election held on 3 August. He defected to the Queensland Labor Party on 26 April 1957 and on 7 May 1957 was appointed Minister for Transport to replace the outgoing Deputy Premier and minister Jack Duggan. With the loss of his seat at the election, Moores' term in the Executive Council of 3 months and 5 days was the shortest in Queensland since the six-day ministry of 1899.

== See also ==
- List of Queensland state by-elections
