= John O'Keefe (Australian politician) =

Australian politician

The Hon John O'Keefe
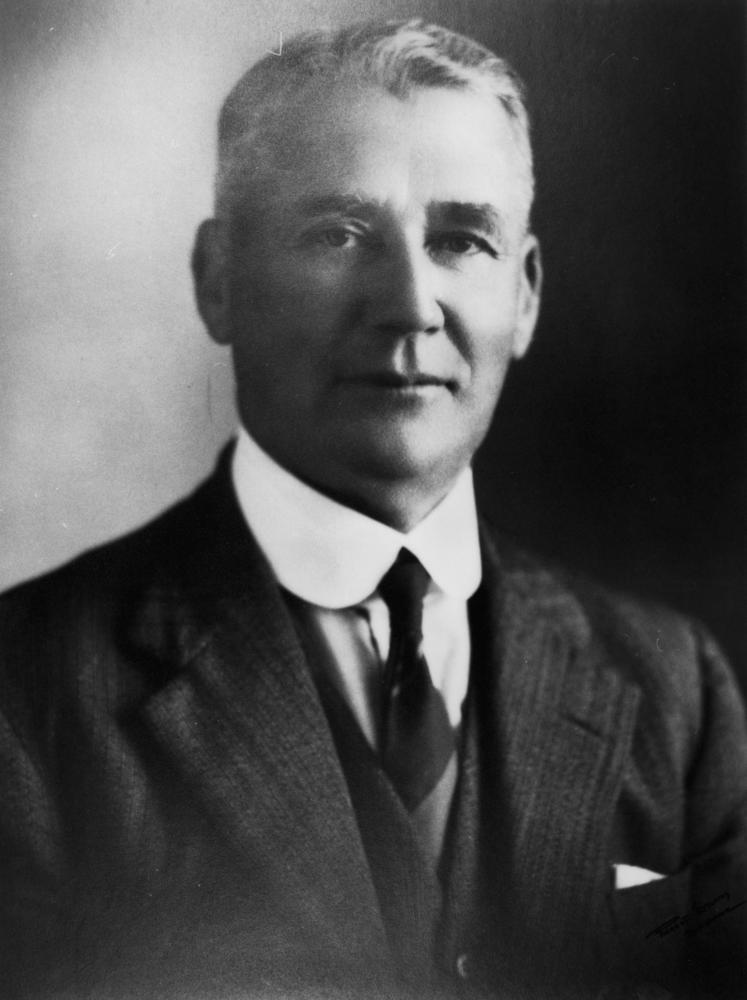

Member of the Queensland Legislative Assembly for Chillagoe
- In office 16 January 1926 – 11 May 1929
- Preceded by: Ted Theodore
- Succeeded by: Ernest Atherton

Member of the Queensland Legislative Assembly for Cairns
- In office 10 May 1930 – 27 January 1942
- Preceded by: William McCormack
- Succeeded by: Lou Barnes

Personal details
- Born: John O'Keefe; 11 January 1880 Gin Gin, Queensland, Australia
- Died: 27 January 1942 (aged 62) Brisbane, Queensland, Australia
- Resting place: Nudgee Cemetery
- Party: Labor
- Spouse: Lydia Adelaide Dargen (m.1918 d.1947)
- Occupation: Drover, Company director

John O'Keefe (11 January 1880 – 27 January 1942) was an Australian politician. He was a Labor member of the Legislative Assembly of Queensland, representing Chillagoe from 1926 to 1929 and Cairns from 1930 to 1942. He was Attorney-General from 1940 to 1941.

O'Keefe died in office in 1942 and following his funeral at St Stephen's Cathedral was buried in Nudgee Cemetery.

Parliament of Queensland
Preceded by Ted Theodore	Member for Chillagoe; 1926–1929	Succeeded by Ernest Atherton
Preceded by William McCormack	Member for Cairns; 1930–1942	Succeeded by Lou Barnes
