= Thomas Crowley (Australian politician) =

Australian politician

Member of the Queensland Legislative Assembly for Cairns
- In office 3 May 1947 – 19 May 1956
- Preceded by: Lou Barnes
- Succeeded by: Watty Wallace

Personal details
- Born: Thomas Martin Crowley; 15 November 1901 Innisfail, Queensland, Australia
- Died: 18 October 1965 (aged 63) Sydney, Australia
- Resting place: Macquarie Park Cemetery
- Party: Labor
- Spouse: Kathleen Evengelista Pease
- Occupation: Farmer

Thomas Martin Crowley (15 November 1901 – 18 October 1965) was a member of the Queensland Legislative Assembly.

== Biography ==
Crowley was born at Innisfail, Queensland, the son of James Crowley and his wife Margaret (née Fitzgerald). He was educated at the Good Samaritan Convent in Innisfail and after leaving school was a wholesaler of wines, spirits and groceries in Cairns and a sugar cane and tobacco farmer at Mossman.

On 30 June 1926 he married Kathleen Agnes Pease and together had two sons and four daughters. He died in Sydney in October 1965.

== Public career ==
Crowley was an alderman on the Cairns City Council from 1938 to 1947 and then beat the sitting member for Cairns, Lou Barnes, at the 1947 state election. He held the seat for nine years, retiring in 1956.

Parliament of Queensland
Preceded by Lou Barnes	Member for Cairns; 1947–1956	Succeeded by Watty Wallace
