= Walter Ingram =

Australian politician

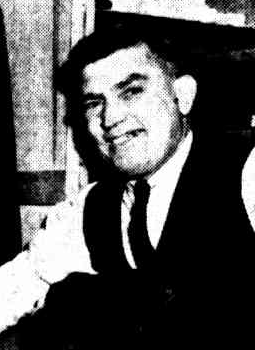

Member of the Queensland Legislative Assembly for Keppel
- In office 15 March 1944 – 24 July 1952
- Preceded by: David Daniel
- Succeeded by: Viv Cooper

Personal details
- Born: Walter Charles Ingram; 23 January 1891 Blackall, Queensland, Australia
- Died: 24 July 1952 (aged 61) Rockhampton, Queensland, Australia
- Resting place: North Rockhampton Cemetery
- Party: Labor
- Spouse: Flora McGregor (m.1913 d.1966)
- Occupation: Labourer

Walter Charles Ingram (23 January 1891 – 24 July 1952) was a member of the Queensland Legislative Assembly.

== Biography ==
Ingram was born at Blackall, Queensland, the son of George William Ingram and Catherine Kelly Ingram. He was educated at Glenmore State School and by 1908 was employed as a road worker and shearer in Yeppoon. In 1910 he was employed as a railway construction worker based at Mount Chalmers and Many Peaks. From 1920 to 1923 he was a wharf labourer in Gladstone, then moved to Mount Morgan to work the mines until 1925. From 1925 until 1928 he was a farmer in Stanwell.

On 16 April 1913 Ingram married Flora McGregor. (died 1966) They had four sons and two daughters.

Ingram died at the Rockhampton General Hospital on 24 July 1952 and his funeral proceeded from St Andrew's Presbyterian Church in Rockhampton to the North Rockhampton Cemetery.

== Public career ==
Ingram, a member of the Labor Party, won the seat of Keppel at the 1944 Queensland state election. He held the seat until his death in 1952. For three years he was the Deputy Chairman of the Mount Morgan Shire Council.

Parliament of Queensland
| Preceded by David Daniel | Member for Keppel; 1944–1952 | Succeeded by Viv Cooper |
