= Lou Barnes =

Australian politician

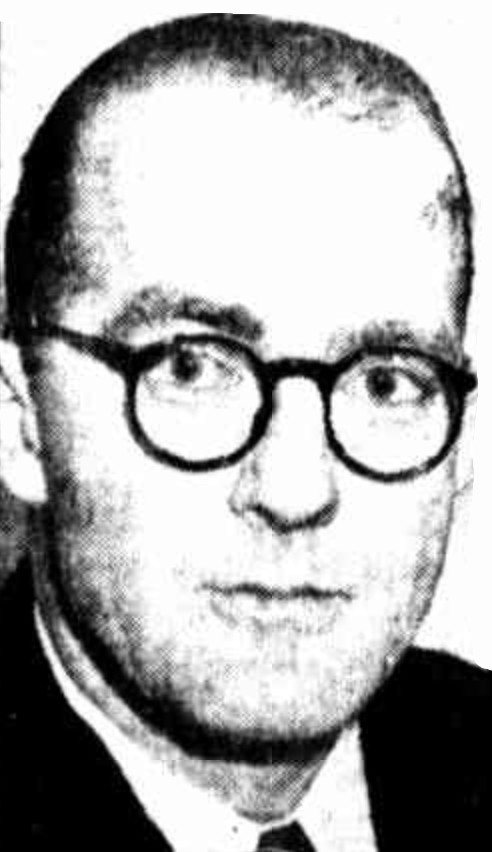

Member of the Queensland Legislative Assembly for Cairns
- In office 31 October 1942 – 3 May 1947
- Preceded by: John O'Keefe
- Succeeded by: Thomas Crowley

Alderman of the City of Gold Coast
- In office 1949–1952

Personal details
- Born: Louis Joseph Barnes; 13 January 1906 Gympie, Queensland, Australia
- Died: 2 June 1983 (aged 77) Southport, Queensland, Australia
- Party: King O'Malley Labor
- Spouse: Muriel Eileen Burke (m.1934)
- Relations: Frank Barnes (brother)
- Occupation: Men's Mercer

Louis Joseph Barnes (13 January 1906 – 2 June 1983) was a member of the Queensland Legislative Assembly.

Barnes was born at Gympie, Queensland, the son of George Daniel Barnes and his wife Bridget Maria (née Gorey). He was educated at the Christian Brothers' College in Gympie and after leaving school was a tea merchant in 1932, a traveler for the Castlemaine Perkins and from 1947 until 1975 a men's Mercer at Beaudesert.

On 24 April 1934 he married Muriel Eileen Burke and together had two sons. Later changing his middle name to Gabriel, Barnes died at Southport in June 1983 and was buried in the Southport Lawn Cemetery.

== Public career ==
Barnes, a member of the King O'Malley Labor Party, won the 1942 by-election for the seat of Cairns in the Queensland Legislative Assembly. The by-election was caused by the death of John O'Keefe in January of that year. He went on to represent the electorate until 1947 when he was defeated by Thomas Crowley at that year's state elections.

After his defeat, Barnes was an alderman on the Gold Coast City Council from 1949 until 1952. His brother, Frank Barnes, was the member for Bundaberg from 1941 to 1950.

Parliament of Queensland
Preceded by John O'Keefe	Member for Cairns; 1942–1947	Succeeded by Thomas Crowley
