= Frank Barnes (politician) =

Australian politician

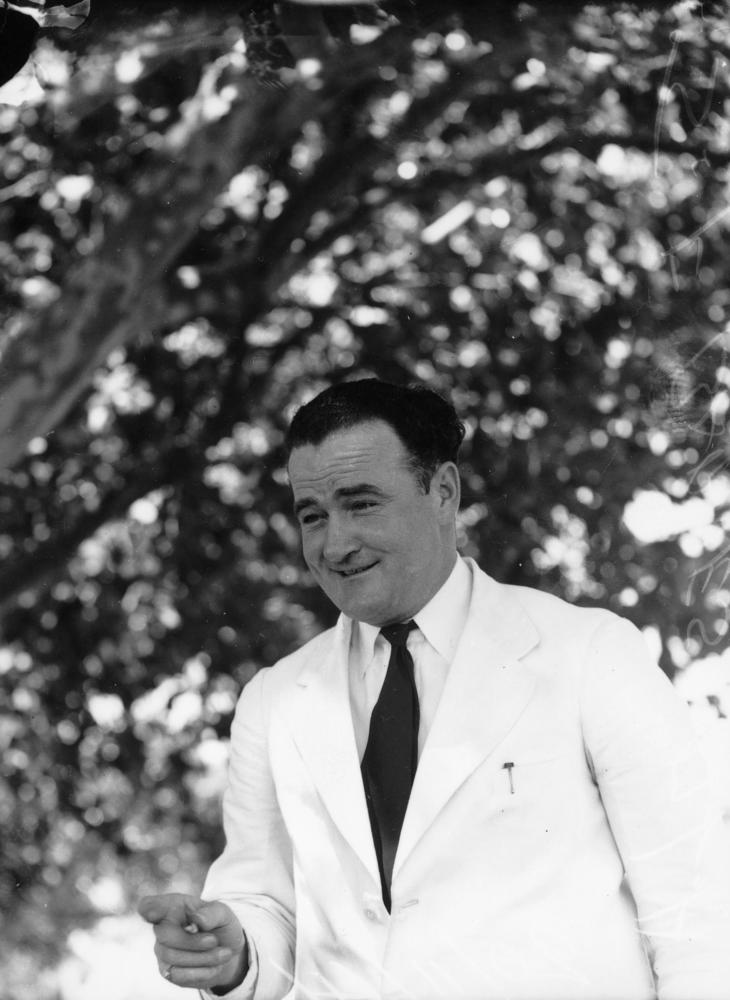

Member of the Queensland Legislative Assembly for Bundaberg
- In office 29 March 1941 – 29 April 1950
- Preceded by: Bernard McLean
- Succeeded by: Ted Walsh

Personal details
- Born: John Francis Barnes; 4 October 1904 Gympie, Queensland, Australia
- Died: 12 May 1952 (aged 47) Bundaberg, Queensland, Australia
- Resting place: Bundaberg General Cemetery
- Party: Frank Barnes Labor (after 1944)
- Other political affiliations: Andrew Fisher Labor (1941-1944)
- Spouse: Evelyn Dorothy Buchanan (m.1943)
- Relations: Lou Barnes (brother)
- Occupation: Publican

John Francis Barnes (4 October 1904 – 12 May 1952) was a politician in Queensland, Australia. He was a Member of the Queensland Legislative Assembly.

== Early life ==
John Francis Barnes was born on 4 October 1904 in Gympie, Queensland, the son of George Daniel (a miner) and his wife Bridget Maria (née Gorey).

== Politics ==
Barnes held the Legislative Assembly of Queensland seat for the electoral district of Bundaberg from 1941 to 1950. During this time he stood as an "Andrew Fisher Labor" and a "Frank Barnes Labor" candidate. His brother Lou Barnes was also a "King O'Malley Labor" member of the Queensland Parliament, representing the seat of Cairns from 1942 to 1947.

Frank Barnes was a colourful identity who supported social credit theories, which had been popular since the Great Depression, and was opposed to the Queensland Labor government.

== Later life ==
Barnes died in Bundaberg on 12 May 1952 and was buried in the Bundaberg General Cemetery.

== Frank Barnes Labor ==
Frank Barnes Labor was the party label that Barnes and several other candidates stood under at Queensland state elections in the 1940s.

At the 1947 state election, 13 candidates (including Barnes) stood under the label. The party did not gain any extra seats.

=== Election results ===
Queensland Legislative Assembly
Election year	Votes	Percentage	Swing	No. of Candidates	No. of seats won	+/–
1944	4,180	0.82	–0.20	1 / 62	1 / 62	Steady
1947	21,823	3.45	+2.63	13 / 62	1 / 62	Steady
1950	5,476	0.44	-3.01	1 / 75	0 / 75	▼1

Parliament of Queensland
Preceded by Bernard McLean	Member for Bundaberg; 1941–1950	Succeeded by Ted Walsh
