= Electoral district of Cairns =

State electoral district of Queensland, Australia

Cairns Queensland—Legislative Assembly
- Map of the electoral district of Cairns, 2017
- State: Queensland
- MP: Michael Healy
- Party: Labor Party
- Namesake: Cairns
- Electors: 36,789 (2020)
- Area: 60 km^{2} (23.2 sq mi)
- Demographic: Provincial
- Coordinates: 16°56′S 145°45′E
Electorates around Cairns:
Barron River	Barron River	Coral Sea
Barron River	Cairns	Mulgrave
Barron River	Mulgrave	Mulgrave

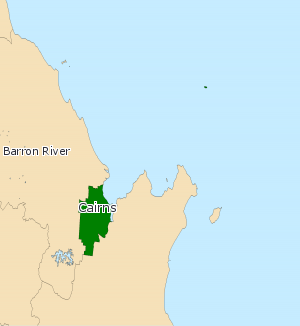
2008 map

Cairns is an electoral district in the Legislative Assembly of Queensland in the state of Queensland, Australia.

The division encompasses the central business district and inner-suburbs of Cairns, in Far North Queensland. Major locations include Bungalow, Manoora, Kanimbla, Earlville and Woree.

== History ==
Created in 1888, Cairns has historically tended to be a safe Labor seat with a blue-collar economy based on sugar, mining and railways. However, in recent decades such industry has been surpassed in importance by tourism and service industries for wealthier retirees and has grown increasingly marginal.

This trend culminated in 2012, when Gavin King took the seat for the LNP on a massive swing of over 13 percent, becoming the first conservative to hold the seat since 1904. The seat reverted to its Labor ways in 2015, when Rob Pyne defeated King on a swing slightly larger than the one King picked up three years earlier. Pyne quit the party to become an independent in 2016. He was defeated by Labor's Michael Healy in 2017.

== Members for Cairns ==
Member	Party	Term
Frederick Wimble	Liberal	1888–1890
Frederick Wimble	Opposition	1890–1893
Thomas Joseph Byrnes	Ministerial	1893–1896
Isidor Lissner	Ministerial	1896–1899
Thomas Givens	Labour	1899–1902
James Lyons	Conservative	1902–1904
John Mann	Labour	1904–1907
John Mann	Kidstonites	1907–1909
John Mann	Independent Opposition	1909–1912
William McCormack	Labor	1912–1930
John O'Keefe	Labor	1930–1942
Lou Barnes	Independent Labor	1942–1947
Thomas Crowley	Labor	1947–1956
Watty Wallace	Labor	1956–1964
Ray Jones	Labor	1965–1983
Keith De Lacy	Labor	1983–1998
Desley Boyle	Labor	1998–2012
Gavin King	Liberal National	2012–2015
Rob Pyne	Labor	2015–2016
Rob Pyne	Independent	2016–2017
Michael Healy	Labor	2017–present

== Election results ==
2024 Queensland state election: Cairns
Party	Candidate	Votes	%	±%
Labor	Michael Healy	10,900	36.07	−8.13
Liberal National	Yolonde Entsch	9,796	32.41	−4.07
One Nation	Geena Court	5,099	16.87	+10.94
Greens	Josh Holt	3,390	11.22	+1.40
Independent	Shane Cuthbert	1,037	3.43	+3.43
Total formal votes		30,222	95.97	−0.49
Informal votes		1,268	4.03	+0.49
Turnout		31,490	79.74	−1.40
Two-party-preferred result
Labor	Michael Healy	15,860	52.48	−3.11
Liberal National	Yolonde Entsch	14,362	47.52	+3.11
Labor hold		Swing	−3.11	
