= Electoral results for the district of Barron River =

List of electoral results for certain district in Queensland, Australia

This is a list of electoral results for the electoral district of Barron River in Queensland state elections.

== Members for Barron River ==
Member	Party	Term
Bill Wood	Labor	1972–1974
Martin Tenni	National	1974–1989
Lesley Clark	Labor	1989–1995
Lyn Warwick	Liberal	1995–1998
Lesley Clark	Labor	1998–2006
Steve Wettenhall	Labor	2006–2012
Michael Trout	Liberal National	2012–2015
Craig Crawford	Labor	2015–2024
Bree James	Liberal National	2024-present

== Election results ==
=== Elections in the 2020s ===
2024 Queensland state election: Barron River
Party	Candidate	Votes	%	±%
Liberal National	Bree James	13,612	39.72	+1.12
Labor	Craig Crawford	11,208	32.71	−6.79
Greens	Denise Crew	3,564	10.40	−2.70
One Nation	Peter Eicens	3,032	8.85	+2.95
Katter's Australian	Ben Campbell	2,851	8.32	+8.32
Total formal votes		34,267	95.95	−0.79
Informal votes		1,448	4.05	+0.79
Turnout		35,715	86.23	−0.30
Two-party-preferred result
Liberal National	Bree James	18,403	53.70	+6.76
Labor	Craig Crawford	15,864	46.30	−6.76
Liberal National gain from Labor		Swing	+6.76	

2020 Queensland state election: Barron River
Party	Candidate	Votes	%	±%
Labor	Craig Crawford	12,385	39.46	+5.98
Liberal National	Linda Cooper	12,092	38.53	+7.90
Greens	Aaron McDonald	4,134	13.17	+0.65
One Nation	Susan Andrews	1,852	5.90	−10.88
Informed Medical Options	Adam Rowe	575	1.83	+1.83
United Australia	Jenny Brown	345	1.10	+1.10
Total formal votes		31,383	96.74	+1.38
Informal votes		1,059	3.26	−1.38
Turnout		32,442	86.53	+2.58
Two-party-preferred result
Labor	Craig Crawford	16,653	53.06	+1.20
Liberal National	Linda Cooper	14,730	46.94	−1.20
Labor hold		Swing	+1.20	

=== Elections in the 2010s ===
2017 Queensland state election: Barron River
Party	Candidate	Votes	%	±%
Labor	Craig Crawford	9,497	33.5	−6.0
Liberal National	Michael Trout	8,686	30.6	−10.4
One Nation	Andrew Schebella	4,760	16.8	+16.8
Greens	Cameron Boyd	3,551	12.5	+2.2
Independent	Cheryl Tonkin	1,039	3.7	+3.7
Independent	Andrew Hodgetts	826	2.9	+2.9
Total formal votes		28,359	95.4	−2.5
Informal votes		1,380	4.6	+2.5
Turnout		29,739	84.0	−3.0
Two-party-preferred result
Labor	Craig Crawford	14,707	51.9	−1.7
Liberal National	Michael Trout	13,652	48.1	+1.7
Labor hold		Swing	−1.7	

2015 Queensland state election: Barron River
Party	Candidate	Votes	%	±%
Liberal National	Michael Trout	13,866	41.60	−4.11
Labor	Craig Crawford	13,138	39.41	+11.57
Greens	Noel Castley-Wright	3,392	10.18	+1.02
Palmer United	Andrew Schebella	2,937	8.81	+8.81
Total formal votes		33,333	97.91	+0.16
Informal votes		710	2.09	−0.16
Turnout		34,043	88.49	−0.98
Two-party-preferred result
Labor	Craig Crawford	16,764	53.12	+12.60
Liberal National	Michael Trout	14,794	46.88	−12.60
Labor gain from Liberal National		Swing	+12.60	

2012 Queensland state election: Barron River
Party	Candidate	Votes	%	±%
Liberal National	Michael Trout	13,652	45.71	+1.88
Labor	Steve Wettenhall	8,317	27.85	−15.40
Katter's Australian	Brendan Fitzgerald	4,732	15.84	+15.84
Greens	Elaine Harding	2,736	9.16	−3.76
Independent	Mike Squire	431	1.44	+1.44
Total formal votes		29,868	97.76	+0.21
Informal votes		685	2.24	−0.21
Turnout		30,553	89.47	−0.17
Two-party-preferred result
Liberal National	Michael Trout	15,406	59.48	+11.80
Labor	Steve Wettenhall	10,494	40.52	−11.80
Liberal National gain from Labor		Swing	+11.80	

=== Elections in the 2000s ===
2009 Queensland state election: Barron River
Party	Candidate	Votes	%	±%
Liberal National	Wendy Richardson	12,025	43.8	+8.6
Labor	Steve Wettenhall	11,864	43.2	+1.9
Greens	Sarah Isaacs	3,545	12.9	−0.8
Total formal votes		27,434	97.1	
Informal votes		689	2.9	
Turnout		28,123	89.6	
Two-party-preferred result
Labor	Steve Wettenhall	13,742	52.3	−2.4
Liberal National	Wendy Richardson	12,522	47.7	+2.4
Labor hold		Swing	−2.4	

2006 Queensland state election: Barron River
Party	Candidate	Votes	%	±%
Labor	Steve Wettenhall	9,901	41.6	−0.7
Liberal	Stephen Welsh	8,244	34.6	−3.5
Greens	Denis Walls	3,162	13.3	+2.7
Independent	Peter Todd	2,517	10.6	+10.6
Total formal votes		23,824	97.7	−0.4
Informal votes		570	2.3	+0.4
Turnout		24,394	88.3	−2.4
Two-party-preferred result
Labor	Steve Wettenhall	12,091	55.1	+2.0
Liberal	Stephen Welsh	9,838	44.9	−2.0
Labor hold		Swing	+2.0	

2004 Queensland state election: Barron River
Party	Candidate	Votes	%	±%
Labor	Lesley Clark	9,849	42.3	−0.7
Liberal	Stephen Walsh	8,867	38.1	+21.9
Greens	Denis Walls	2,461	10.6	+5.1
One Nation	Peter Starr	1,576	6.8	−9.4
Independent	Andrew Ryan	545	2.3	+2.3
Total formal votes		23,298	98.1	−0.4
Informal votes		462	1.9	+0.4
Turnout		23,760	90.7	+0.2
Two-party-preferred result
Labor	Lesley Clark	11,316	53.1	−4.2
Liberal	Stephen Welsh	9,988	46.9	+46.9
Labor hold		Swing	−4.2	

2001 Queensland state election: Barron River
Party	Candidate	Votes	%	±%
Labor	Lesley Clark	9,511	43.0	+7.9
Independent	Sno Bonneau	4,213	19.1	+19.1
Liberal	Lyn Warwick	3,588	16.2	−13.1
One Nation	Peter Starr	3,587	16.2	−10.8
Greens	Denis Walls	1,212	5.5	+0.4
Total formal votes		22,111	98.5	
Informal votes		336	1.5	
Turnout		22,447	90.5	
Two-candidate-preferred result
Labor	Lesley Clark	10,759	57.3	+6.4
Independent	Sno Bonneau	8,031	42.7	+42.7
Labor hold		Swing	+6.4	

=== Elections in the 1990s ===
1998 Queensland state election: Barron River
Party	Candidate	Votes	%	±%
Labor	Lesley Clark	7,118	35.2	−3.1
Liberal	Lyn Warwick	6,050	29.9	+3.8
One Nation	Peter Starr	5,457	27.0	+27.0
Greens	Denis Walls	1,037	5.1	−5.3
Democrats	Lisa Golding	313	1.5	−0.7
Independent	Steve Dimitriou	270	1.3	+0.0
Total formal votes		20,245	98.9	+0.3
Informal votes		235	1.1	−0.3
Turnout		235	90.9	
Two-party-preferred result
Labor	Lesley Clark	9,287	50.6	+1.0
Liberal	Lyn Warwick	9,057	49.4	−1.0
Labor gain from Liberal		Swing	+1.0	

1995 Queensland state election: Barron River
Party	Candidate	Votes	%	±%
Labor	Lesley Clark	6,981	38.2	−6.7
Liberal	Lyn Warwick	4,764	26.1	+5.0
National	Ron Crew	3,836	21.0	−2.9
Greens	Chris Nielsen	1,900	10.4	+2.7
Democrats	Leonie Watson	414	2.3	+2.3
Independent	Steve Dimitriou	241	1.3	−1.1
Independent	Brian Hoffman	119	0.7	+0.7
Total formal votes		18,255	98.5	+0.5
Informal votes		275	1.5	−0.5
Turnout		18,530	87.2	
Two-party-preferred result
Liberal	Lyn Warwick	8,521	50.4	+50.4
Labor	Lesley Clark	8,389	49.6	−3.8
Liberal gain from Labor		Swing	+3.8	

1992 Queensland state election: Barron River
Party	Candidate	Votes	%	±%
Labor	Lesley Clark	8,199	44.9	−11.8
National	Ron Crew	4,369	23.9	−6.8
Liberal	Norm Millhouse	3,844	21.1	+9.2
Greens	John Felan	1,400	7.7	+7.7
Independent	Steve Dimitriou	448	2.5	+2.5
Total formal votes		18,260	98.0	
Informal votes		370	2.0	
Turnout		18,630	87.1	
Two-party-preferred result
Labor	Lesley Clark	9,363	54.2	−5.0
National	Ron Crew	7,925	45.8	+5.0
Labor hold		Swing	−5.0	

=== Elections in the 1980s ===
1989 Queensland state election: Barron River
Party	Candidate	Votes	%	±%
Labor	Lesley Clark	10,421	55.0	+9.0
National	Peter Dunn	6,040	31.9	−22.1
Liberal	David Forehead	2,485	13.1	+13.1
Total formal votes		18,946	96.4	−1.2
Informal votes		705	3.6	+1.2
Turnout		19,651	87.9	−0.9
Two-party-preferred result
Labor	Lesley Clark	10,894	57.5	+11.5
National	Peter Dunn	8,052	42.5	−11.5
Labor gain from National		Swing	+11.5	

1986 Queensland state election: Barron River
Party	Candidate	Votes	%	±%
National	Martin Tenni	7,990	54.0	+0.8
Labor	Terry Doyle	6,795	46.0	−0.8
Total formal votes		14,785	97.6	
Informal votes		366	2.4	
Turnout		15,151	88.8	
National hold		Swing	+0.8	

1983 Queensland state election: Barron River
Party	Candidate	Votes	%	±%
National	Martin Tenni	10,966	53.2	+10.5
Labor	Wendy Lilja	9,642	46.8	+1.6
Total formal votes		20,608	98.2	−0.7
Informal votes		370	1.8	+0.7
Turnout		20,978	89.4	+3.3
National hold		Swing	+2.4	

1980 Queensland state election: Barron River
Party	Candidate	Votes	%	±%
National	Martin Tenni	7,236	42.7	−7.5
Labor	Keith De Lacy	7,668	45.2	−4.6
Liberal	Lionel Van Dorssen	1,578	9.3	+9.3
Democrats	Bruce Alexander	470	2.8	+2.8
Total formal votes		16,952	98.9	+0.8
Informal votes		190	1.1	−0.8
Turnout		17,142	86.1	−3.4
Two-party-preferred result
National	Martin Tenni	8,605	50.8	+0.6
Labor	Keith De Lacy	8,347	49.2	−0.6
National hold		Swing	+0.6	

=== Elections in the 1970s ===
1977 Queensland state election: Barron River
Party	Candidate	Votes	%	±%
National	Martin Tenni	7,663	50.2	+3.0
Labor	Keith De Lacy	7,593	49.8	+2.1
Total formal votes		15,256	98.1	
Informal votes		301	1.9	
Turnout		15,557	89.5	
National hold		Swing	−0.7	

1974 Queensland state election: Barron River
Party	Candidate	Votes	%	±%
Labor	Bill Wood	7,075	47.7	−4.6
National	Martin Tenni	7,010	47.2	+6.5
Queensland Labor	Douglas McClarty	458	3.1	−0.3
Australia	John Lamb	302	2.0	+2.0
Total formal votes		14,845	98.5	0.0
Informal votes		229	1.5	0.0
Turnout		15,074	86.8	−4.5
Two-party-preferred result
National	Martin Tenni	7,531	50.7	+4.1
Labor	Bill Wood	7,314	49.3	−4.1
National gain from Labor		Swing	+4.1	

1972 Queensland state election: Barron River
Party	Candidate	Votes	%	±%
Labor	Bill Wood	6,507	52.3	
Country	Micheli Borzi	5,066	40.7	
Liberal	Rex Silver	443	3.6	
Queensland Labor	Thomas White	428	3.4	
Total formal votes		12,444	98.5	
Informal votes		191	1.5	
Turnout		12,635	91.3	
Two-party-preferred result
Labor	Bill Wood	6,641	53.4	−3.7
Country	Micheli Borzi	5,803	46.6	+3.7
Labor hold		Swing	−3.7	
