= Minister for the Arts (Queensland) =

Government minister in Queensland, Australia

Minister for the Arts of Queensland

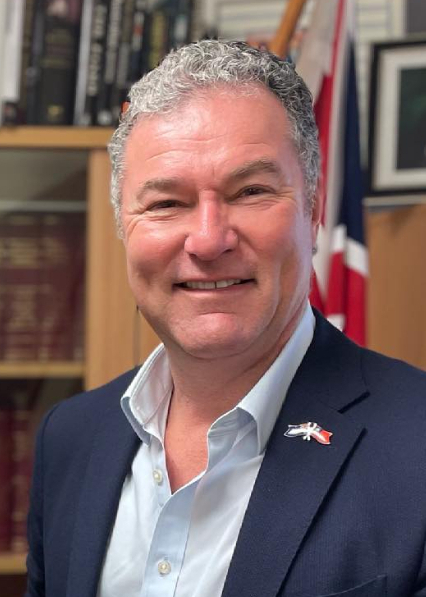
- Incumbent; John-Paul Langbroek since 1 November 2024
- Arts Queensland
- Style: The Honourable
- Nominator: Premier of Queensland
- Appointer: Governor of Queensland
- Inaugural holder: Alan Fletcher (as the Minister for Cultural Activities)
- Formation: 17 January 1968

The Queensland Minister for the Arts is a minister in the Queensland Government who is responsible for the administration and support of the arts. The minister administers the portfolio through Arts Queensland, which is within the Department of Education.

The current minister is John-Paul Langbroek, who was sworn in on 1 November 2024 as part of the full Crisafulli ministry following the Liberal National Party's victory at the 2024 Queensland state election. Langbroek is also the Minister for Education.

== List of ministers ==
No.	Minister	Party	Ministry	Title	Term start	Term end	Term in office	Ref.
1	Alan Fletcher	Country	Pizzey; Chalk; Bjelke-Petersen (1) (2) (3)	Minister for Education and Cultural Activities	17 January 1968	23 December 1974	6 years, 340 days	
2	Tom Newbery	National	Bjelke-Petersen (4)	Minister for Education and Cultural Activities	23 December 1974	10 March 1975	77 days	
3	Val Bird	National	Bjelke-Petersen (4)	Minister for Education and Cultural Activities	10 March 1975	16 December 1977	2 years, 281 days	
(2)	Tom Newbery	National	Bjelke-Petersen (5)	Minister for Culture, National Parks and Recreation	16 December 1977	21 August 1979	1 year, 248 days	
4	Ivan Gibbs	National	Bjelke-Petersen (5)	Minister for Culture, National Parks and Recreation	24 August 1979	23 December 1980	1 year, 121 days	
5	Tony Elliott	National	Bjelke-Petersen (6) (7)	Minister for Tourism, National Parks, Sport and the Arts	23 December 1980	7 November 1983	2 years, 319 days	
6	Peter McKechnie	National	Bjelke-Petersen (8)	Minister for Tourism, National Parks, Sport and the Arts	7 November 1983	1 December 1986	3 years, 24 days	
7	Brian Austin	National	Bjelke-Petersen (9)	Minister for the Arts	1 December 1986	25 November 1987	359 days	
8	Gordon Simpson	National	Bjelke-Petersen (9)	Minister for the Arts	25 November 1987	1 December 1987	6 days	
9	Mike Ahern	National	Ahern	Minister for the Arts	9 December 1987	25 September 1989	1 year, 290 days	
10	Paul Clauson	National	Cooper	Minister for Heritage and the Arts	25 September 1989	7 December 1989	73 days	
11	Wayne Goss	Labor	Goss (1)	Minister for the Arts	7 December 1989	24 September 1992	2 years, 292 days	
12	Dean Wells	Labor	Goss (2)	Minister for the Arts	24 September 1992	31 July 1995	2 years, 310 days	
13	Matt Foley	Labor	Goss (3)	Minister for the Arts	31 July 1995	19 February 1996	203 days	
14	Joan Sheldon	Liberal	Borbidge	Minister for the Arts	19 February 1996	26 June 1998	2 years, 127 days	
(13)	Matt Foley	Labor	Beattie (1) (2)	Minister for the Arts	29 June 1998	12 February 2004	5 years, 228 days	
15	Anna Bligh	Labor	Beattie (3)	Minister for Education and the Arts	12 February 2004	28 July 2005	1 year, 166 days	
16	Rod Welford	Labor	Beattie (4) (5); Bligh (1)	Minister for the Arts	28 July 2005	26 March 2009	3 years, 240 days	
(15)	Anna Bligh	Labor	Bligh (2)	Minister for the Arts	26 March 2009	21 February 2011	1 year, 332 days	
17	Rachel Nolan	Labor	Bligh (3)	Minister for Finance and the Arts	21 February 2011	22 June 2011	1 year, 34 days	
17	Rachel Nolan	Labor	Bligh (3)	Minister for Finance, Natural Resources and the Arts	22 June 2011	26 March 2012	1 year, 34 days	
18	Ros Bates	Liberal National	Newman	Minister for Science, IT, Innovation and the Arts	3 April 2012	15 February 2013	318 days	
19	Ian Walker	Liberal National	Newman	Minister for Science, IT, Innovation and the Arts	20 February 2013	31 January 2015	1 year, 345 days	
20	Annastacia Palaszczuk	Labor	Palaszczuk (1)	Minister for the Arts	16 February 2015	11 December 2017	2 years, 298 days	
21	Leeanne Enoch	Labor	Palaszczuk (2) (3); Miles	Minister for the Arts	12 December 2017	27 October 2024	6 years, 320 days	
22	John-Paul Langbroek	Liberal National	Crisafulli	Minister for the Arts	1 November 2024	Incumbent	1 year, 310 days	
