= Electoral results for the district of Hinchinbrook =

Queensland, Australia, district election results

This is a list of electoral results for the electoral district of Hinchinbrook in Queensland state elections.

== Members for Hinchinbrook ==
Member	Party	Term
Cecil Jesson	Labor	1950–1960
John Row	Country	1960–1972
Ted Row	Country	1972–1974
Ted Row	National	1974–1989
Marc Rowell	National	1989–2006
Andrew Cripps	National	2006–2008
Andrew Cripps	Liberal National	2008–2017
Nick Dametto	Katter's Australian	2017–2025
Wayde Chiesa	Liberal National	2025–present

== Election results ==
=== Elections in the 2020s ===
2025 Hinchinbrook state by-election
Party	Candidate	Votes	%	±%
Liberal National	Wayde Chiesa	11,771	41.4	+13.2
Katter's Australian	Mark Molachino	8,569	30.1	–16.3
One Nation	Luke Sleep	3,834	13.5	+8.9
Labor	Maurie Soars	2,356	8.3	–5.8
Greens	Aiden Creagh	980	3.4	+0.5
Family First	Amanda Nickson	620	2.2	+2.2
Independent	Steven Clare	323	1.1	+1.1
Total formal votes		28,069	96.0	–0.6
Informal votes		1,169	4.0	+0.6
Turnout				
Two-candidate-preferred result
Liberal National	Wayde Chiesa	15,340	53.79	+16.96
Katter's Australian	Mark Molachino	13,177	46.21	–16.96
Liberal National gain from Katter's Australian		Swing	+16.96	

Results are not final. Last updated at 22:36 AEST on 29 November 2025.

2024 Queensland state election: Hinchinbrook
Party	Candidate	Votes	%	±%
Katter's Australian	Nick Dametto	15,351	46.42	+3.88
Liberal National	Annette Swaine	9,331	28.22	+3.28
Labor	Ina Pryor	4,639	14.03	−5.41
One Nation	Ric Daubert	1,523	4.60	−2.52
Legalise Cannabis	Kevin Wheatley	1,181	3.57	+3.57
Greens	Jon Kowski	1,044	3.16	−0.27
Total formal votes		33,069	96.57	+0.02
Informal votes		1,175	3.43	−0.02
Turnout		34,244	87.96	+0.97
Two-candidate-preferred result
Katter's Australian	Nick Dametto	20,889	63.17	−1.59
Liberal National	Annette Swaine	12,180	36.83	+1.59
Katter's Australian hold		Swing	−1.59	

2020 Queensland state election: Hinchinbrook
Party	Candidate	Votes	%	±%
Katter's Australian	Nick Dametto	12,522	42.54	+21.59
Liberal National	Scott Piper	7,342	24.94	−5.17
Labor	Paul Jacob	5,723	19.44	+0.42
One Nation	Michael Sullivan	2,097	7.12	−14.90
Greens	Carolyn Mewing	1,010	3.43	+0.19
United Australia	Aurelio Mason	393	1.34	+1.34
Independent	Jen Sackley	351	1.19	+1.19
Total formal votes		29,438	96.55	+0.64
Informal votes		1,053	3.45	−0.64
Turnout		30,491	86.99	−1.13
Notional two-party-preferred count
Liberal National	Scott Piper		57.40	
Labor	Paul Jacob		44.10	
Two-candidate-preferred result
Katter's Australian	Nick Dametto	19,064	64.76	+7.21
Liberal National	Scott Piper	10,374	35.24	−7.21
Katter's Australian hold		Swing	+7.21	

=== Elections in the 2010s ===
2017 Queensland state election: Hinchinbrook
Party	Candidate	Votes	%	±%
Liberal National	Andrew Cripps	8,523	30.1	−7.6
One Nation	Margaret Bell	6,232	22.0	+16.2
Katter's Australian	Nick Dametto	5,929	20.9	+8.1
Labor	Paul Jacob	5,384	19.0	−8.4
Independent	Peter Raffles	1,316	4.7	+4.7
Greens	Lyle Burness	917	3.2	+0.1
Total formal votes		28,301	95.9	−2.2
Informal votes		1,208	4.1	+2.2
Turnout		29,509	88.1	+3.5
Two-candidate-preferred result
Katter's Australian	Nick Dametto	16,288	57.6	+57.6
Liberal National	Andrew Cripps	12,013	42.5	−11.0
Katter's Australian gain from Liberal National		Swing	+11.0	

2015 Queensland state election: Hinchinbrook
Party	Candidate	Votes	%	±%
Liberal National	Andrew Cripps	12,156	40.67	−3.37
Labor	Jesse Trecco-Alexander	7,155	23.94	+7.39
Katter's Australian	Barry Barnes	5,224	17.48	−17.76
Palmer United	Martin Brewster	3,029	10.13	+10.13
One Nation	William Hankin	1,224	4.10	+4.10
Greens	Jenny Stirling	1,101	3.68	+0.49
Total formal votes		29,889	98.29	−0.22
Informal votes		520	1.71	+0.22
Turnout		30,409	90.61	−1.56
Two-candidate-preferred result
Liberal National	Andrew Cripps	14,354	57.06	+3.43
Labor	Jesse Trecco-Alexander	10,804	42.94	+42.94
Liberal National hold		Swing	+3.43	

2012 Queensland state election: Hinchinbrook
Party	Candidate	Votes	%	±%
Liberal National	Andrew Cripps	11,952	44.04	−13.92
Katter's Australian	Jeff Knuth	9,564	35.24	+35.24
Labor	Tony McGuire	4,491	16.55	−13.06
Greens	Pamela Monaghan	867	3.19	−2.42
Independent	Desmond Connors	263	0.97	+0.97
Total formal votes		27,137	98.51	+0.73
Informal votes		410	1.49	−0.73
Turnout		27,547	92.17	+0.63
Two-candidate-preferred result
Liberal National	Andrew Cripps	12,652	53.63	−11.06
Katter's Australian	Jeff Knuth	10,940	46.37	+46.37
Liberal National hold		Swing	−11.06	

=== Elections in the 2000s ===
2009 Queensland state election: Hinchinbrook
Party	Candidate	Votes	%	±%
Liberal National	Andrew Cripps	14,551	58.0	+10.1
Labor	Mark Platt	7,433	29.6	−14.5
Independent	Raymond Thompson	1,712	6.8	+6.8
Greens	Michelle Macklin	1,409	5.6	−0.6
Total formal votes		25,105	97.5	
Informal votes		570	2.5	
Turnout		25,675	91.5	
Two-party-preferred result
Liberal National	Andrew Cripps	15,044	64.7	+12.7
Labor	Mark Platt	8,212	35.3	−12.7
Liberal National hold		Swing	+12.7	

2006 Queensland state election: Hinchinbrook
Party	Candidate	Votes	%	±%
National	Andrew Cripps	10,146	50.4	+8.6
Labor	Steve Kilburn	8,678	43.1	+18.9
Greens	Fay McKenzie	1,293	6.4	+6.4
Total formal votes		20,117	97.5	−0.7
Informal votes		509	2.5	+0.7
Turnout		20,626	91.3	−1.5
Two-party-preferred result
National	Andrew Cripps	10,465	53.7	−7.2
Labor	Steve Kilburn	9,026	46.3	+46.3
National hold		Swing	−7.2	

2004 Queensland state election: Hinchinbrook
Party	Candidate	Votes	%	±%
National	Marc Rowell	8,619	41.8	+13.0
Labor	Guni Liepins	4,982	24.2	−1.9
Independent	Andrew Lancini	4,419	21.4	+4.0
One Nation	Trevor Mitchell	2,602	12.6	−13.8
Total formal votes		20,622	98.2	−0.0
Informal votes		374	1.8	+0.0
Turnout		20,996	92.8	−0.3
Two-candidate-preferred result
National	Marc Rowell	9,824	60.9	+8.1
Independent	Andrew Lancini	6,312	39.1	+39.1
National hold		Swing	+8.1	

2001 Queensland state election: Hinchinbrook
Party	Candidate	Votes	%	±%
National	Marc Rowell	5,862	28.8	−5.7
One Nation	Robert Ralph	5,362	26.4	−5.1
Labor	Mick Small	5,313	26.1	−0.7
Independent	Andrew Lancini	3,534	17.4	+17.4
City Country Alliance	Elaine Steley	270	1.3	+1.3
Total formal votes		20,341	98.2	
Informal votes		362	1.8	
Turnout		20,703	93.1	
Two-candidate-preferred result
National	Marc Rowell	7,192	52.8	−3.9
One Nation	Robert Ralph	6,436	47.2	+3.9
National hold		Swing	−3.9	

=== Elections in the 1990s ===
1998 Queensland state election: Hinchinbrook
Party	Candidate	Votes	%	±%
National	Marc Rowell	7,675	36.7	−26.1
One Nation	John Wyllie	6,172	29.5	+29.5
Labor	Richard Barkas	6,008	28.7	−4.8
Australia First	Teresa Roveda	1,078	5.1	+5.1
Total formal votes		20,933	98.7	+0.2
Informal votes		284	1.3	−0.2
Turnout		21,217	93.6	+1.9
Two-candidate-preferred result
National	Marc Rowell	10,975	58.6	−6.2
One Nation	John Wyllie	7,766	41.4	+41.4
National hold		Swing	−6.2	

1995 Queensland state election: Hinchinbrook
Party	Candidate	Votes	%	±%
National	Marc Rowell	12,908	62.8	+10.5
Labor	Diana O'Brien	6,882	33.5	−14.3
Democrats	John Preece	769	3.7	+3.7
Total formal votes		20,559	98.5	+0.4
Informal votes		320	1.5	−0.4
Turnout		20,879	91.7	
Two-party-preferred result
National	Marc Rowell	13,207	64.7	+12.4
Labor	Diana O'Brien	7,202	35.3	−12.4
National hold		Swing	+12.4	

1992 Queensland state election: Hinchinbrook
Party	Candidate	Votes	%	±%
National	Marc Rowell	10,957	52.3	+18.1
Labor	Bill Eaton	10,008	47.7	−1.0
Total formal votes		20,965	98.0	
Informal votes		422	2.0	
Turnout		21,387	92.9	
National gain from Labor		Swing	+5.3	

=== Elections in the 1980s ===
1989 Queensland state election: Hinchinbrook
Party	Candidate	Votes	%	±%
Labor	George Day	5,354	43.3	+4.2
National	Marc Rowell	4,240	34.3	−13.3
Liberal	Antonino Cardillo	2,526	20.4	+8.8
Independent	Ron Dunn	236	1.9	+0.2
Total formal votes		12,356	97.2	−0.7
Informal votes		355	2.8	+0.7
Turnout		12,711	92.6	−0.4
Two-party-preferred result
National	Marc Rowell	6,353	51.4	−5.6
Labor	George Day	6,003	48.6	+5.6
National hold		Swing	−5.6	

1986 Queensland state election: Hinchinbrook
Party	Candidate	Votes	%	±%
National	Ted Row	5,705	47.6	+0.5
Labor	Allan Vitale	4,693	39.1	−1.8
Liberal	John Williams	1,390	11.6	−0.4
Independent	Ron Dunn	209	1.7	+1.7
Total formal votes		11,997	97.9	−0.7
Informal votes		252	2.1	+0.7
Turnout		12,249	93.0	−0.1
Two-party-preferred result
National	Ted Row	6,832	56.9	+1.1
Labor	Allan Vitale	5,165	43.1	−1.1
National hold		Swing	+1.1	

1983 Queensland state election: Hinchinbrook
Party	Candidate	Votes	%	±%
National	Ted Row	5,718	47.1	−2.5
Labor	Stephen Bredhauer	4,964	40.9	+8.2
Liberal	William Mason	1,458	12.0	+12.0
Total formal votes		12,140	98.6	+1.5
Informal votes		169	1.4	−1.5
Turnout		12,309	93.1	+2.9
Two-party-preferred result
National	Ted Row	6,828	56.2	−3.0
Labor	Stephen Bredhauer	5,312	43.8	+3.0
National hold		Swing	−3.0	

1980 Queensland state election: Hinchinbrook
Party	Candidate	Votes	%	±%
National	Ted Row	5,555	49.6	−3.5
Labor	Norman Hart	3,665	32.7	−14.2
Independent	John Williams	1,171	10.5	+10.5
Independent	Des Bredhauer	814	7.3	+7.3
Total formal votes		11,205	97.1	−0.7
Informal votes		335	2.9	+0.7
Turnout		11,540	90.2	−2.0
Two-party-preferred result
National	Ted Row	6,629	59.2	+6.1
Labor	Norman Hart	4,576	40.8	−6.1
National hold		Swing	+6.1	

=== Elections in the 1970s ===
1977 Queensland state election: Hinchinbrook
Party	Candidate	Votes	%	±%
National	Ted Row	5,854	53.1	−3.2
Labor	James Byrne	5,177	46.9	+13.8
Total formal votes		11,031	97.8	
Informal votes		242	2.2	
Turnout		11,273	92.2	
National hold		Swing	−7.3	

1974 Queensland state election: Hinchinbrook
Party	Candidate	Votes	%	±%
National	Ted Row	5,872	56.3	+15.9
Labor	Desley Clinton	3,448	33.1	−11.5
Queensland Labor	John Williams	911	8.7	−6.3
Australian Advancement	Evelyn Scott	199	1.9	+1.9
Total formal votes		10,430	97.8	−0.3
Informal votes		236	2.2	+0.3
Turnout		10,666	90.9	−2.0
Two-party-preferred result
National	Ted Row	6,728	60.4	+7.9
Labor	Desley Clinton	3,702	39.6	−7.9
National hold		Swing	+7.9	

1972 Queensland state election: Hinchinbrook
Party	Candidate	Votes	%	±%
Labor	James Byrne	4,162	44.6	+11.6
Country	Ted Row	3,777	40.4	−15.3
Queensland Labor	Peter Wood	1,399	15.0	+3.6
Total formal votes		9,338	98.1	
Informal votes		185	1.9	
Turnout		9,523	92.9	
Two-party-preferred result
Country	Ted Row	4,904	52.5	−13.1
Labor	James Byrne	4,434	47.5	+13.1
Country hold		Swing	−13.1	

=== Elections in the 1960s ===
1969 Queensland state election: Hinchinbrook
Party	Candidate	Votes	%	±%
Country	John Row	4,620	55.7	−7.4
Labor	Frederick Page	2,735	33.0	+3.5
Queensland Labor	John Williams	943	11.4	+4.0
Total formal votes		8,298	97.3	+0.2
Informal votes		234	2.7	−0.2
Turnout		8,532	91.3	−2.0
Two-party-preferred result
Country	John Row	5,388	64.9	−4.2
Labor	Frederick Page	2,910	35.1	+4.2
Country hold		Swing	−4.2	

1966 Queensland state election: Hinchinbrook
Party	Candidate	Votes	%	±%
Country	John Row	4,943	63.1	+6.3
Labor	Natale Palanza	2,312	29.5	−3.8
Queensland Labor	John Williams	576	7.4	+0.4
Total formal votes		7,831	97.1	−0.5
Informal votes		235	2.9	+0.5
Turnout		8,066	93.3	−0.9
Two-party-preferred result
Country	John Row	5,412	69.1	+6.0
Labor	Natale Palanza	2,419	30.9	−6.0
Country hold		Swing	+6.0	

1963 Queensland state election: Hinchinbrook
Party	Candidate	Votes	%	±%
Country	John Row	4,158	56.8	+12.7
Labor	Kevin Cavanagh	2,439	33.3	−6.4
Queensland Labor	Jack Williams	514	7.0	−3.0
Communist	George Bordujenko	205	2.8	+2.8
Total formal votes		7,316	97.6	−0.8
Informal votes		178	2.4	+0.8
Turnout		7,494	94.2	+0.4
Two-party-preferred result
Country	John Row	4,617	63.1	
Labor	Kevin Cavanagh	2,699	36.9	
Country hold		Swing	N/A	

1960 Queensland state election: Hinchinbrook
Party	Candidate	Votes	%	±%
Country	John Row	3,082	44.1	
Labor	Kevin Cavanagh	2,776	39.7	
Queensland Labor	Victor Bodero	697	10.0	
Independent	William Wilson	438	6.3	
Total formal votes		6,993	98.4	
Informal votes		112	1.6	
Turnout		7,105	93.8	
Country gain from Labor		Swing		

=== Elections in the 1950s ===
1957 Queensland state election: Hinchinbrook
Party	Candidate	Votes	%	±%
Labor	Cecil Jesson	3,057	35.2	−16.9
Country	John Row	2,473	28.5	+28.5
Independent	Francis Curro	1,652	19.0	+19.0
Queensland Labor	John Argaet	1,497	17.3	+17.3
Total formal votes		8,679	98.4	−0.1
Informal votes		144	1.6	+0.1
Turnout		8,823	94.4	+1.8
Labor hold		Swing	+3.2	

1956 Queensland state election: Hinchinbrook
Party	Candidate	Votes	%	±%
Labor	Cecil Jesson	4,319	52.1	−7.2
Liberal	Francis Curro	3,964	47.9	+27.5
Total formal votes		8,283	98.5	+0.3
Informal votes		125	1.5	−0.3
Turnout		8,408	92.6	+0.6
Labor hold		Swing	−17.3	

1953 Queensland state election: Hinchinbrook
Party	Candidate	Votes	%	±%
Labor	Cecil Jesson	4,494	59.3	+3.3
Liberal	James Ryan	1,549	20.4	−23.7
Independent	Douglas Jeffrey	1,534	20.2	+20.2
Total formal votes		7,577	98.2	+0.1
Informal votes		139	1.8	−0.1
Turnout		7,716	92.0	+1.9
Labor hold		Swing	+18.4	

1950 Queensland state election: Hinchinbrook
Party	Candidate	Votes	%	±%
Labor	Cecil Jesson	4,005	55.9	
Liberal	Charles Mylrea	3,158	44.1	
Total formal votes		7,163	98.1	
Informal votes		141	1.9	
Turnout		7,304	90.1	
Labor hold		Swing		
