= Minister for Customer Services (Queensland) =

Government minister in Queensland, Australia

Minister for Customer Services of Queensland

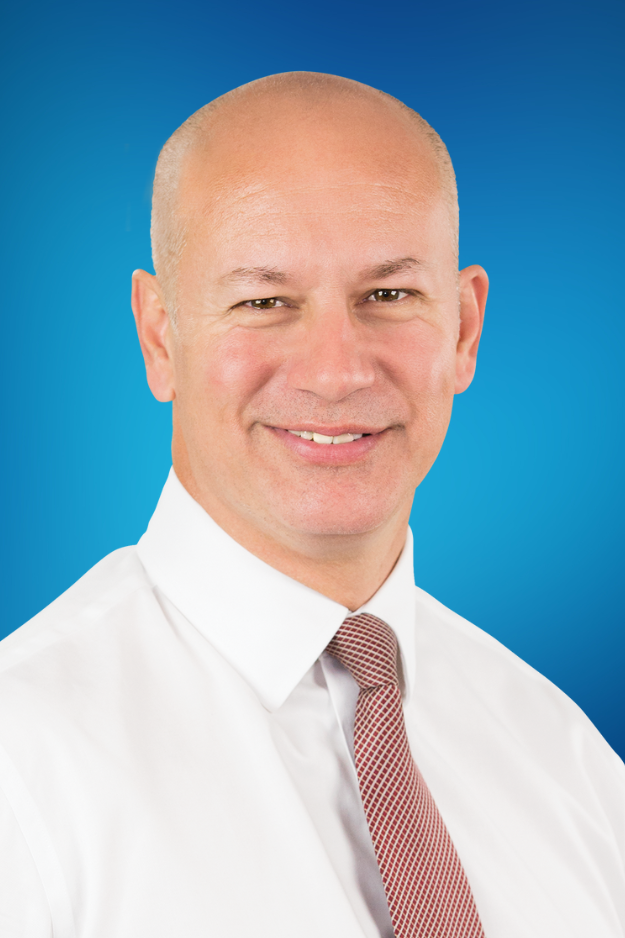
- Incumbent; Steve Minnikin since 1 November 2024
- Department of Customer Services, Open Data and Small and Family Business
- Style: The Honourable
- Nominator: Premier of Queensland
- Appointer: Governor of Queensland
- Inaugural holder: Norm Lee (as the Minister for Industry and Administrative Services)
- Formation: 16 December 1977

The Queensland Minister for Customer Services is a minister in the Queensland Government who is responsible for the provision of effective access to government services. The minister administers the portfolio through the Department of Customer Services, Open Data and Small and Family Business.

The current minister is Steve Minnikin, who was sworn in on 1 November 2024 as part of the full Crisafulli ministry following the Liberal National Party's victory at the 2024 Queensland state election. Minnikin is also the Minister for Small and Family Business.

== List of ministers ==
No.	Minister	Party	Ministry	Title	Term start	Term end	Term in office	Ref.
1	Norm Lee	Liberal	Bjelke-Petersen (5)	Minister for Industry and Administrative Services	16 December 1977	23 December 1980	3 years, 7 days	
2	Bill Hewitt	Liberal	Bjelke-Petersen (6)	Minister for Environment, Valuation and Administrative Services	23 December 1980	5 August 1983	2 years, 225 days	
3	Martin Tenni	National	Bjelke-Petersen (7) (8)	Minister for Environment, Valuation and Administrative Services	19 August 1983	6 February 1986	2 years, 171 days	
4	Geoff Muntz	National	Bjelke-Petersen (8)	Minister for Corrective Services, Administration Services and Valuation	6 February 1986	1 December 1986	298 days	
5	Don Neal	National	Bjelke-Petersen (9)	Minister for Corrective Services, Administration Services and Valuation	1 December 1986	1 December 1987	1 year, 0 days	
6	Russell Cooper	National	Ahern	Minister for Corrective Services and Administrative Services	9 December 1987	19 January 1989	1 year, 41 days	
6	Russell Cooper	National	Ahern	Minister for Emergency Services and Administrative Services	19 January 1989	29 August 1989	222 days	
7	Tony FitzGerald	National	Cooper	Minister for Emergency Services and Administrative Services	25 September 1989	7 December 1989	73 days	
8	Ron McLean	Labor	Goss (1)	Minister for Administrative Services	7 December 1989	24 September 1992	2 years, 292 days	
9	Tom Burns	Labor	Goss (2)	Minister for Administrative Services	24 September 1992	18 October 1993	1 year, 24 days	
10	Glen Milliner	Labor	Goss (2) (3)	Minister for Administrative Services	18 October 1993	19 February 1996	2 years, 124 days	
11	Mark Bailey	Labor	Palaszczuk (3)	Minister for Digital Services	18 May 2023	17 December 2023	213 days	
12	Bart Mellish	Labor	Miles	Minister for Digital Services	18 December 2023	27 October 2024	314 days	
13	Steve Minnikin	Liberal National	Crisafulli	Minister for Customer Services and Open Data	1 November 2024	Incumbent	1 year, 310 days	
