= Members of the Queensland Legislative Assembly, 1966–1969 =

This is a list of members of the 38th Legislative Assembly of Queensland from 1966 to 1969, as elected at the 1966 state election held on 28 May 1966.

Name	Party	Electorate	Term in office
Bunny Adair	Independent	Cook	1953–1969
Mike Ahern ^{[2]}	Country	Landsborough	1968–1990
Tom Aikens	NQLP	Townsville South	1944–1977
Roy Armstrong	Country	Mulgrave	1960–1980
Edwin Beardmore	Country	Balonne	1957–1969
Col Bennett	Labor	South Brisbane	1960–1972
Hon Joh Bjelke-Petersen	Country	Barambah	1947–1987
Jim Blake ^{[3]}	Labor	Isis	1968–1974, 1977–1983
Fred Bromley	Labor	Norman	1960–1974
Peter Byrne	Labor	Mourilyan	1950–1969
Hon Ron Camm	Country	Whitsunday	1961–1980
Hon Fred Campbell	Liberal	Aspley	1960–1980
Cec Carey	Country	Albert	1960–1969
Hon Gordon Chalk	Liberal	Lockyer	1947–1976
Geoff Chinchen	Liberal	Mount Gravatt	1963–1977
Arthur Coburn	Independent	Burdekin	1950–1969
David Cory	Country	Warwick	1963–1977
Horace Davies	Labor	Maryborough	1953–1971
Harry Dean	Labor	Sandgate	1960–1977
Hon Peter Delamothe	Liberal	Bowen	1960–1971
Hon Alex Dewar	Liberal/Independent	Wavell	1950–1969
Les Diplock	DLP	Aubigny	1953–1972
Jim Donald	Labor	Ipswich East	1946–1969
John Dufficy	Labor	Warrego	1951–1969
Jack Duggan	Labor	Toowoomba West	1935–1957, 1958–1969
William Ewan ^{[1]}	Country	Roma	1950–1953, 1957–1967
Hon Alan Fletcher	Country	Cunningham	1953–1974
Fred Graham	Labor	Mackay	1943–1969
Pat Hanlon	Labor	Baroona	1956–1974
Martin Hanson	Labor	Port Curtis	1963–1976
Ted Harris	Labor	Wynnum	1966–1974
Hon John Herbert	Liberal	Sherwood	1956–1978
Nev Hewitt	Country	Mackenzie	1956–1980
Bill Hewitt	Liberal	Chatsworth	1966–1983
Russ Hinze	Country	South Coast	1966–1988
Hon Max Hodges	Country	Gympie	1957–1979
Keith Hooper	Liberal	Greenslopes	1957–1977
Jim Houghton	Country	Redcliffe	1960–1979
Jack Houston	Labor	Bulimba	1957–1980
Clive Hughes	Liberal	Kurilpa	1960–1974
Alec Inch	Labor	Burke	1960–1974
Ray Jones	Labor	Cairns	1965–1983
Vince Jones	Country	Callide	1950–1971
Vi Jordan	Labor	Ipswich West	1966–1974
Bill Kaus	Liberal	Hawthorne	1966–1986
Hon William Knox	Liberal	Nundah	1957–1989
Norm Lee	Liberal	Yeronga	1964–1989
Bill Lickiss	Liberal	Mount Coot-tha	1963–1989
Eric Lloyd	Labor	Kedron	1951–1972
Bill Longeran	Country	Flinders	1957–1958, 1958–1974
David Low	Country	Cooroora	1947–1974
Henry McKechnie	Country	Carnarvon	1963–1974
Johnno Mann	Labor	Brisbane	1936–1969
Jack Melloy	Labor	Nudgee	1960–1977
Col Miller	Liberal	Ithaca	1966–1986
Alf Muller	Country	Fassifern	1935–1969
John Murray	Liberal	Clayfield	1963–1976
Tom Newbery	Country	Mirani	1965–1980
Fred Newton	Labor	Belmont	1960–1974
Hon David Nicholson	Country	Murrumba	1950–1972
Hon Frank Nicklin ^{[2]}	Country	Landsborough	1932–1968
Eugene O'Donnell	Labor	Barcoo	1961–1974
Rex Pilbeam	Liberal	Rockhampton South	1960–1969
Hon Jack Pizzey ^{[3]}	Country	Isis	1950–1968
Charles Porter	Liberal	Toowong	1966–1980
Wally Rae	Country	Gregory	1957–1974
Sam Ramsden	Liberal	Merthyr	1957–1971
Hon Harold Richter	Country	Somerset	1957–1972
Hon John Row	Country	Hinchinbrook	1960–1972
Doug Sherrington	Labor	Salisbury	1960–1974
Ray Smith	Liberal	Windsor	1957–1969
Hon Vic Sullivan	Country	Condamine	1960–1983
Merv Thackeray	Labor	Rockhampton North	1957–1972
Ken Tomkins ^{[1]}	Country	Roma	1967–1983
Hon Douglas Tooth	Liberal	Ashgrove	1957–1974
Perc Tucker	Labor	Townsville North	1960–1974
Edwin Wallis-Smith	Labor	Tablelands	1963–1974
Ted Walsh	Independent	Bundaberg	1935–1947, 1950–1969
Claude Wharton	Country	Burnett	1960–1986
Dick Wood	Country	Logan	1966–1969
Peter Wood	Labor	Toowoomba East	1966–1974

^{1} On 14 March 1967, the Country member for Roma, William Ewan, died. Country candidate Ken Tomkins won the resulting by-election on 24 June 1967.
^{2} On 13 February 1968, the Country member for Landsborough and Premier of Queensland, Frank Nicklin, resigned. Country candidate Mike Ahern won the resulting by-election on 16 March 1968.
^{3} On 31 July 1968, the Country member for Isis and Premier of Queensland, Jack Pizzey, died. Labor candidate Jim Blake won the resulting by-election on 16 November 1968.

== See also ==
- 1966 Queensland state election
- Nicklin Ministry (Country/Liberal) (1957–1968)
- Pizzey Ministry (Country/Liberal) (17 January–31 July 1968)
- Chalk Ministry (Liberal/Country) (1–8 August 1968)
- Bjelke-Petersen Ministry (Country/Liberal) (1968–1987)
