= Minister for Corrective Services (Queensland) =

Government minister in Queensland, Australia

Minister for Corrective Services of Queensland
- Incumbent; Laura Gerber since 1 November 2024
- Queensland Corrective Services
- Style: The Honourable
- Nominator: Premier of Queensland
- Appointer: Governor of Queensland
- Inaugural holder: Geoff Muntz (as the Minister for Corrective Services, Administration Services and Valuation)
- Formation: 6 February 1986

The Queensland Minister for Corrective Services is a minister in the Queensland Government who is responsible for Queensland Corrective Services, a government agency that manages correctional centres and provides for the rehabilitation of offenders.

The current minister is Laura Gerber, who was sworn in on 1 November 2024 as part of the full Crisafulli ministry following the Liberal National Party's victory at the 2024 Queensland state election. Gerber is also the Minister for Youth Justice and Victim Support.

== List of ministers ==
No.	Minister	Party	Ministry	Title	Term start	Term end	Term in office	Ref.
1	Geoff Muntz	National	Bjelke-Petersen (7)	Minister for Corrective Services, Administration Services and Valuation	6 February 1986	1 December 1986	298 days	
2	Don Neal	National	Bjelke-Petersen (8)	Minister for Corrective Services, Administration Services and Valuation	1 December 1986	1 December 1987	1 year, 0 days	
3	Russell Cooper	National	Ahern	Minister for Corrective Services and Administrative Services	9 December 1987	19 January 1989	1 year, 41 days	
4	Paul Clauson	National	Ahern	Minister for Corrective Services	19 January 1989	29 August 1989	222 days	
5	Ian Henderson	National	Cooper	Minister for Justice and Corrective Services	25 October 1989	7 December 1989	43 days	
6	Glen Milliner	Labor	Goss (1)	Minister for Justice and Corrective Services	7 December 1989	24 September 1992	2 years, 292 days	
6	Glen Milliner	Labor	Goss (2)	Minister for Corrective Services	24 September 1992	18 October 1993	1 year, 24 days	
7	Paul Braddy	Labor	Goss (2) (3)	Minister for Corrective Services	18 October 1993	19 February 1996	2 years, 124 days	
(3)	Russell Cooper	National	Borbidge	Minister for Police and Corrective Services	26 February 1996	26 June 1998	2 years, 120 days	
8	Tom Barton	Labor	Beattie (1)	Minister for Police and Corrective Services	29 June 1998	22 February 2001	2 years, 238 days	
9	Tony McGrady	Labor	Beattie (2)	Minister for Police and Corrective Services	22 February 2001	12 February 2004	2 years, 355 days	
10	Judy Spence	Labor	Beattie (3) (4) (5); Bligh (1)	Minister for Police and Corrective Services	12 February 2004	26 March 2009	5 years, 42 days	
11	Neil Roberts	Labor	Bligh (2) (3)	Minister for Police, Corrective Services and Emergency Services	26 March 2009	26 March 2012	3 years, 0 days	
12	Jo-Ann Miller	Labor	Palaszczuk (1)	Minister for Corrective Services	16 February 2015	4 December 2015	291 days	
13	Bill Byrne	Labor	Palaszczuk (1)	Minister for Corrective Services	8 December 2015	11 November 2016	339 days	
14	Mark Ryan	Labor	Palaszczuk (1) (2)	Minister for Corrective Services	11 November 2016	11 November 2020	4 years, 0 days	
14	Mark Ryan	Labor	Palaszczuk (3)	Minister for Police and Corrective Services	12 November 2020	17 December 2023	3 years, 35 days	
15	Nikki Boyd	Labor	Miles	Minister for Corrective Services	18 December 2023	27 October 2024	314 days	
16	Laura Gerber	Liberal National	Crisafulli	Minister for Corrective Services	1 November 2024	Incumbent	1 year, 310 days	
