= Minister for Aboriginal and Torres Strait Islander Partnerships (Queensland) =

Government minister in Queensland, Australia

Minister for Aboriginal and Torres Strait Islander Partnerships of Queensland
- Incumbent; Fiona Simpson since 1 November 2024
- Style: The Honourable
- Nominator: Premier of Queensland
- Appointer: Governor of Queensland
- Inaugural holder: Judy Spence (as the Minister for Aboriginal and Torres Strait Islander Policy)
- Formation: 29 June 1998

The Queensland Minister for Aboriginal and Torres Strait Islander Partnerships is a minister in the Queensland Government who is responsible for legislation and policy concerning Aboriginal and Torres Strait Islander people and reconciliation. The minister administers the portfolio through the Department of Women, Aboriginal and Torres Strait Islander Partnerships and Multiculturalism.

The current minister is Fiona Simpson, who was sworn in on 1 November 2024 as part of the full Crisafulli ministry following the Liberal National Party's victory at the 2024 Queensland state election. Simpson is also the Minister for Women and Women's Economic Security and the Minister for Multiculturalism.

== List of ministers ==
No.	Minister	Party	Ministry	Title	Term start	Term end	Term in office	Ref.
1	Judy Spence	Labor	Beattie (1) (2)	Minister for Aboriginal and Torres Strait Islander Policy	29 June 1998	12 February 2004	5 years, 228 days	
2	Liddy Clark	Labor	Beattie (3)	Minister for Aboriginal and Torres Strait Islander Policy	12 February 2004	1 March 2005	1 year, 17 days	
3	John Mickel	Labor	Beattie (3)	Minister for Aboriginal and Torres Strait Islander Policy	3 March 2005	28 July 2005	1 year, 194 days	
3	John Mickel	Labor	Beattie (4)	Minister for Aboriginal and Torres Strait Islander Policy	28 July 2005	13 September 2006	1 year, 194 days	
4	Warren Pitt	Labor	Beattie (5)	Minister for Aboriginal and Torres Strait Islander Partnerships	30 January 2007	13 September 2007	226 days	
5	Lindy Nelson-Carr	Labor	Bligh (1)	Minister for Aboriginal and Torres Strait Islander Partnerships	13 September 2007	26 March 2009	1 year, 194 days	
6	Desley Boyle	Labor	Bligh (2)	Minister for Aboriginal and Torres Strait Islander Partnerships	26 March 2009	21 February 2011	1 year, 332 days	
7	Curtis Pitt	Labor	Bligh (3)	Minister for Aboriginal and Torres Strait Islander Partnerships	21 February 2011	26 March 2012	1 year, 34 days	
8	Jack Dempsey	Liberal National	Newman	Minister for Aboriginal and Torres Strait Islander and Multicultural Affairs	3 April 2012	23 April 2012	20 days	
9	Glen Elmes	Liberal National	Newman	Minister for Aboriginal and Torres Strait Islander and Multicultural Affairs	23 April 2012	31 January 2015	2 years, 283 days	
(7)	Curtis Pitt	Labor	Palaszczuk (1)	Minister for Aboriginal and Torres Strait Islander Partnerships	16 February 2015	10 February 2017	1 year, 360 days	
10	Mark Furner	Labor	Palaszczuk (1)	Minister for Aboriginal and Torres Strait Islander Partnerships	10 February 2017	11 December 2017	304 days	
11	Jackie Trad	Labor	Palaszczuk (2)	Minister for Aboriginal and Torres Strait Islander Partnerships	12 December 2017	10 May 2020	2 years, 150 days	
12	Craig Crawford	Labor	Palaszczuk (2)	Minister for Aboriginal and Torres Strait Islander Partnerships	12 May 2020	12 November 2020	3 years, 5 days	
12	Craig Crawford	Labor	Palaszczuk (3)	Minister for Aboriginal and Torres Strait Islander Partnerships	12 November 2020	17 May 2023	3 years, 5 days	
13	Leeanne Enoch	Labor	Palaszczuk (3)	Minister for Treaty and Minister for Aboriginal and Torres Strait Islander Partnerships	18 May 2023	15 December 2023	1 year, 163 days	
13	Leeanne Enoch	Labor	Miles	Minister for Treaty and Minister for Aboriginal and Torres Strait Islander Partnerships	18 December 2023	28 October 2024	1 year, 163 days	
14	Fiona Simpson	Liberal National	Crisafulli	Minister for Aboriginal and Torres Strait Islander Partnerships	1 November 2024	Incumbent	1 year, 310 days	
