= Minister for Child Safety (Queensland) =

Government minister in Queensland, Australia

Minister for Child Safety of Queensland
- Incumbent; Amanda Camm since 1 November 2024
- Department of Families, Seniors, Disability Services and Child Safety
- Style: The Honourable
- Nominator: Premier of Queensland
- Appointer: Governor of Queensland
- Inaugural holder: Mike Reynolds
- Formation: 12 February 2004

The Queensland Minister for Child Safety is a minister in the Queensland Government who is responsible for the provision of social services in relation to child safety. The minister administers the portfolio through the Department of Families, Seniors, Disability Services and Child Safety.

The current minister is Amanda Camm, who was sworn in on 1 November 2024 as part of the full Crisafulli ministry following the Liberal National Party's victory at the 2024 Queensland state election. Camm is also the Minister for Families, Seniors and Disabilities.

== List of ministers ==
No.	Minister	Party	Ministry	Title	Term start	Term end	Term in office	Ref.
1	Mike Reynolds	Labor	Beattie (3) (4)	Minister for Child Safety	12 February 2004	13 September 2006	2 years, 213 days	
2	Desley Boyle	Labor	Beattie (5)	Minister for Child Safety	13 September 2006	13 September 2007	1 year, 0 days	
3	Margaret Keech	Labor	Bligh (1)	Minister for Child Safety	13 September 2007	26 March 2009	1 year, 194 days	
4	Phil Reeves	Labor	Bligh (2) (3)	Minister for Child Safety	26 March 2009	26 March 2012	3 years, 0 days	
5	Tracy Davis	Liberal National	Newman	Minister for Communities, Child Safety and Disability Services	3 April 2012	13 February 2015	2 years, 316 days	
6	Shannon Fentiman	Labor	Palaszczuk (1)	Minister for Child Safety	16 February 2015	11 December 2017	2 years, 298 days	
7	Di Farmer	Labor	Palaszczuk (2)	Minister for Child Safety, Youth and Women	12 December 2017	11 November 2020	2 years, 335 days	
8	Leanne Linard	Labor	Palaszczuk (3)	Minister for Children and Youth Justice	12 November 2020	17 May 2023	2 years, 186 days	
9	Craig Crawford	Labor	Palaszczuk (3)	Minister for Child Safety	18 May 2023	17 December 2023	213 days	
10	Charis Mullen	Labor	Miles	Minister for Child Safety	18 December 2023	27 October 2024	314 days	
11	Amanda Camm	Liberal National	Crisafulli	Minister for Child Safety and the Prevention of Domestic and Family Violence	1 November 2024	Incumbent	1 year, 310 days	
