= Pelota Mano Court, Trebonne =

Pelota Mano Court
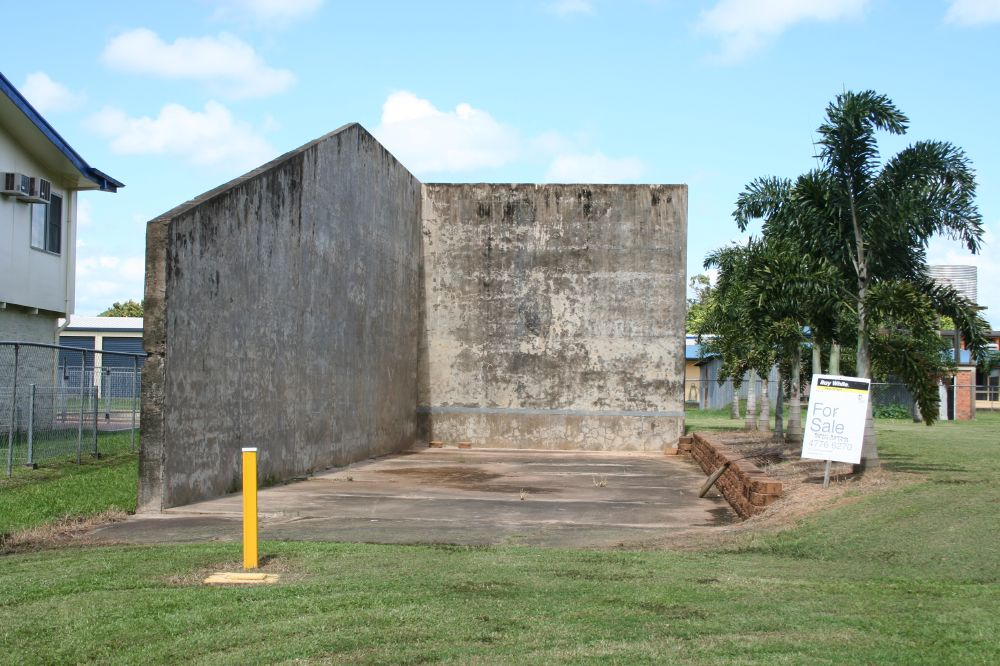
- Pelota Mano Court, 2007

- Location within Queensland Location within Australia
- 18.6265°S 146.0791°E
- Location: Trebonne Road, Trebonne, Shire of Hinchinbrook, Queensland, Australia

History
- Design period: 1940s - 1960s (post-World War II)
- Built: 1959

Site notes
- Architect(s): Ford, Hutton & Newell

Queensland Heritage Register
- Official name: Pelota Mano Court, Basque Handball Court, Fronton
- Type: state heritage (built)
- Designated: 27 July 2001
- Reference no.: 601169
- Significant period: 1959 (fabric); 1959-1970s (historical, social)
- Builders: Idillio Quartero and Ken Duffy

Pelota Mano Court is a heritage-listed sports ground at Trebonne Road, Trebonne, Shire of Hinchinbrook, Queensland, Australia. It was designed by Ford, Hutton & Newell and built in 1959 by Idillio Quartero and Ken Duffy. It is also known as Basque Handball Court and Fronton (court). It was added to the Queensland Heritage Register on 27 July 2001.

== History ==
The Pelota Mano (Handball) Court, or fronton, was opened on 28 November 1959, in Trebonne, a small township, eight kilometres west of Ingham in the Herbert River district of North Queensland. Jack Williams, solicitor, opened the court and Reverend Father Tomas Ormazabal, travelling Chaplain for the Spanish community of North Queensland, dedicated it. The court was established through the efforts of the local Basque community.

Handball is an ancient game. The Maya tribes of pre-Columbian America and the ancient Greeks and Romans had versions of the game. The Romans spread it throughout western Europe. In the area of modern-day France, a variation of the Romans' game of "pila" emerged, and during the Middle Ages it became known as "jeu de paume". Basque handball is a derivative of this game.

Andrea Navajero, a Venetian historian, travelled through the Basque county in 1528 and commented on how all the males played this game. Indoor ('courte paume') and outdoor ('longue paume') versions endured during the 18th century, but following the French Revolution the games were nearly abandoned for being associated with royalty and nobility. Its popularity, however, remained in small circles. From the early outdoor version evolved modern tennis and in the Basque country it became the present manifestation of Basque handball.

The Basque pelota mano derives from Roman versions of the game and spread throughout western Europe and France. What became the traditional game "pelota basque" played in church porticos or during village festivals is now played competitively at international competitions. The supreme version of the game is today "cesta-punta" and is played with a long, scooped wicker basket, a "chistera", on a fronton called a "jai-alai".

Besides the chistera, the game can be played with an assortment of equipment, for example, the bare hand, a wooden bat or a wooden-framed strung racket called a "xare". There are also different types of balls, for example, one is covered in leather and weighs 52 grams (1.8 oz), another is covered in parchment and weighs 90 grams (3.2 oz), while yet another is rubber and weighs 40 grams (1.4 oz).

Originally played face to face, the introduction of more rapid rubber balls compelled a change in the game: returning the ball to a wall instead of over the net. Thus Basque handball was born. While theoretically, the game can be played anywhere where there is a high wide wall, three types of pelota mano courts evolved: the "plaza laxoa" or open court with only one wall at the front; the "ezker pareta" or left-wall court with one wall at the front and one on the players left and the "trinketa" or original court of the indoor form with four walls. The handball court at Trebonne is an example of the ezker pareta type of court.

Basque migration to the Herbert River District, North Queensland, began in 1907 and grew in momentum, peaking between 1958 and 1960. The numbers were never great (In the five voyages between 1958 and 1960 that brought Spaniards to Australia, 387 identified themselves as Basque residents) and today there is little, if any, migration of Basques to North Queensland. By the late 1960s only 100 people of Spanish nationality, 85% of whom identified as Basques, remained in the district. Basque immigrants were predominantly male, with most arriving to cut sugar cane. While canecutting was an arduous task and left the canecutter weary by nightfall, on the weekends the cutters were keen to socialise. One popular gathering place was a farm owned by the Mendiolea family, where migrants found hospitality and companionship, home cooked food and family life. In Trebonne in the 1950s improvisation was necessary. The Mendiolea concrete farm house had a high, wide back wall, and, with a tennis ball, many young Basque migrants soon found a traditional outlet for their excess energy - pelota mano.

Another place to socialise was the Trebonne Hotel run by Mr and Mrs Joe Sartoresi. The hotel attracted Spanish and Basque canecutting gangs working and living on the farms west of Ingham and was ideally located on the intersection of the main road from Ingham to Abergowrie and the road to Stone River. Open-air dancing took place on a wooden floor laid over the grass and card games, especially "mus", were played. These pastimes connected the Basque people with their homeland. Eventually they were able to play pelota mano in the grounds of the hotel, courtesy of Joe Sartoresi.

The hotelier was persuaded to build a court by two brothers, Jose Marie and Felix Jayo, who ran a baker's shop across from the hotel at the time, and Albert Urberuaga. They had seen the potential for a proper court in the grounds of the hotel. For many months Sartoresi remained sceptical. The cost was an issue and he had never seen the game played. One afternoon, Sartoresi visited the Mendiolea farm, where he not only saw the vigorous and noisy game in progress, but noted how many people were gathered, and that a good amount of beer was being consumed as the afternoon passed. He came away with a change of heart. He could see that the initial cost of the court would be compensated by the increased clientele and the business they would generate.

In order to build the fronton a plan was required. Albert Urberuaga with Agustin Adarraga obtained a plan from the Basque country, however, being for a plan for a jai-alai court, it was too large and had to be modified in both size and strength. The court also had to comply with building regulations which required that the structure be able to "withstand winds of over 100 miles an hour." Appropriate plans were drawn up by architectural firm, Ford, Hutton and Newell. Builders Idillio Quartero and Ken Duffy were engaged for the construction.

The structure was built on two feet wide and six feet deep foundations. It was constructed of concrete composed of four parts river gravel and sand to one part Portland cement. It was estimated that about 80 long tons (81 t) of cement was used. Both upright walls were reinforced with steel. At the highest point the walls were six metres and at the lowest point, three metres. The court was 18 metres (59 ft) in length and six metres wide. The playing surfaces were finished with a cement render. The cement was mixed in a large cement mixer and transferred to wheelbarrows. The wheelbarrows were pushed up planks on wooden scaffolding constructed around the formwork. In between moves of the scaffolding the slope of the plank increased. As it did a run-up was required with each push of the full wheelbarrow. There was much community interest in the construction and the Basques could hardly restrain their excitement. The two contractors with one paid worker, an apprentice, and some weekend helpers took six weeks to complete the contract.

The playing area was divided into six cuadro (sections) each one marked and numbered in paint. At a later date Jose Badiola, bricklayer, added another 10 feet (3.0 m) of wall to make seven cuadro. Not built to the same specifications as the original this addition was later demolished as it became unsafe. The fronton was also equipped with lights for night games. On the opening day, formalities were conducted by Jack Williams and Father Ormazabal, and tributes were paid to the Sartoresi family, an exhibition game and barbeque were also held. On this occasion and for special competitions traditional Basque clothing was worn to play the game, consisting of a white skirt and trousers with a green or red sash, a guerrko, and espadrille like footwear, known as alpargatas.

The publicans during the heyday of the fronton were Joe Sartoresi and Gino Manini. The first advertised event was a "Monster Dance and Barbecue" held on Saturday, 16 July 1960. Entertainment included an exhibition of handball and an orchestra. A Spanish Handball Club was founded on 24 June 1960. Joe Sartoresi was appointed Patron while Pasqual Badiola was elected president. The Spanish Club held barbeques to raise money for the upkeep of the fronton, to purchase seating and to purchase the goatskin pelotas which were sent from the Basque country.

For nearly a decade, the fronton attracted many people, especially on Friday nights and on the weekend. Up to 200 people gathered, particularly on nights when there was dancing and a barbecue organised by the Club. Over the years, the Spanish Handball Club (variously referred to as the Spanish Club, the Handball Club and the Trebonne Handball Club) was not the only organisation which benefited from the entertainment at the fronton. The Trebonne State School, Ingham Golf Club, Tennis Association, amongst others, have been beneficiaries. In all the years of its use, activity at the fronton peaked from July to December, the harvesting months.

Few of the Basques who came to the Herbert River District in the late 1950s and early 1960s remained. Most, if they did not return to their Basque homeland, settled elsewhere, particularly in Melbourne and Sydney. Today the Pelota Mano Handball Court stands unused, attracting occasional interest from locals and tourists. It remains, however, as a solitary remaining monument, marking the small but significant migration of Basque people to North Queensland.

== Description ==
The Pelota Mano Handball Court is located in Trebonne Road, Trebonne. The court comprises two reinforced concrete walls and concrete slabs on the ground. The long or side wall (eastern elevation) is eighteen metres in length. The end wall (southern) elevation is six metres in length.

The concrete sections extend beyond the long wall, in a generally northerly direction, for six metres. The slab extension has remains of a brick wall extension which has collapsed. An electrical fuse box and conduits are located on the end wall. The court sits generally in the north-eastern corner of the property, surrounded by a chain wire fence. There is no other development on the property on which the court is located.

== Heritage listing ==
Pelota Mano Court was listed on the Queensland Heritage Register on 27 July 2001 having satisfied the following criteria.

The place is important in demonstrating the evolution or pattern of Queensland's history.

The Pelota Mano Court, Trebonne, is significant historically as a rare illustration of the presence of people of Basque origin in Queensland. Basque migration to northern Queensland peaked in the late 1950s, and although small in numbers, contributed significantly to the sustainability of the sugar industry in North Queensland in the 1950s and early 1960s.

The place demonstrates rare, uncommon or endangered aspects of Queensland's cultural heritage.

There are few monuments or reminders of the presence of the Basques in Queensland, as many later returned to their homeland or relocated to southern cities, which devolves strong rarity value on the Pelota Mano Court, Trebonne. The place is further significant for its rarity as the only purpose-built fronton constructed in Queensland.

The place is important in demonstrating the principal characteristics of a particular class of cultural places.

Constructed with one wall at the front and one on the players left, the Pelota Mano Court is important in demonstrating the principal characteristics of the "ezker pareta", or left-wall type of traditional Basque handball court construction.

The place has a strong or special association with a particular community or cultural group for social, cultural or spiritual reasons.

The Pelota Mano Court, Trebonne has social significance, having historically a strong association for the Basque community in Trebonne and surrounding areas as one of the focal points for their cultural and social activities. It remains important to people of Basque descent who still reside in the district, as evidenced by the recently written history of the place.

The place has a special association with the life or work of a particular person, group or organisation of importance in Queensland's history.

The Pelota Mano Court, Trebonne, is significant for its strong association with the Basque community in the district. The small but significant migration of Basque people to the area was instrumental in the success of the sugar industry in North Queensland, particularly in the period following the Second World War.
