= Electoral district of Barron River =

State electoral district of Queensland, Australia

Barron River Queensland—Legislative Assembly
- Map of the electoral district of Barron River, 2017
- State: Queensland
- Dates current: 1972–present
- MP: Bree James
- Party: Liberal National
- Namesake: Barron River
- Electors: 37,492 (2020)
- Area: 568 km^{2} (219.3 sq mi)
- Demographic: Provincial
- Coordinates: 16°51′S 145°44′E
Electorates around Barron River:
Cook	Cook	Coral Sea
Cook	Barron River	Cairns
Cook	Mulgrave	Mulgrave

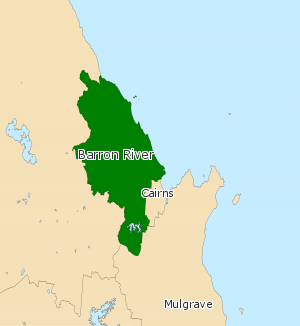
2008 electoral map

Barron River is an electoral district of the Legislative Assembly in the Australian state of Queensland.

Created at the 1971 redistribution, it currently covers the northern suburbs of Cairns, as well as Kuranda. The Barron River from which the electorate derives its name runs through its centre. It is bordered by the districts of Cook to the north and west, Cairns to the southeast and Mulgrave to the south.

== Members for Barron River ==
Member	Party	Term
Bill Wood	Labor	1972–1974
Martin Tenni	National	1974–1989
Lesley Clark	Labor	1989–1995
Lyn Warwick	Liberal	1995–1998
Lesley Clark	Labor	1998–2006
Steve Wettenhall	Labor	2006–2012
Michael Trout	Liberal National	2012–2015
Craig Crawford	Labor	2015–2024
Bree James	Liberal National	2024–present

== Election results ==
2024 Queensland state election: Barron River
Party	Candidate	Votes	%	±%
Liberal National	Bree James	13,612	39.72	+1.12
Labor	Craig Crawford	11,208	32.71	−6.79
Greens	Denise Crew	3,564	10.40	−2.70
One Nation	Peter Eicens	3,032	8.85	+2.95
Katter's Australian	Ben Campbell	2,851	8.32	+8.32
Total formal votes		34,267	95.95	−0.79
Informal votes		1,448	4.05	+0.79
Turnout		35,715	86.23	−0.30
Two-party-preferred result
Liberal National	Bree James	18,403	53.70	+6.76
Labor	Craig Crawford	15,864	46.30	−6.76
Liberal National gain from Labor		Swing	+6.76	

Primary vote results in Barron River (Parties that did not get 5% of the vote are omitted)
Labor
Liberal National

Liberal
Country/National

Greens
One Nation
Katter's Australian
Palmer United/United Australia Party
Independent
View source data.
Two-candidate-preferred vote results in Barron River View source data.
