= Michael Trout (Australian politician) =

Australian politician (born 1963)

Member of the Queensland Parliament for Barron River
- In office 24 March 2012 – 31 January 2015
- Preceded by: Steve Wettenhall
- Succeeded by: Craig Crawford

Personal details
- Born: 21 November 1963 (age 62)
- Party: Liberal National Party
- Occupation: Tourism industry

Michael John Trout (born 21 November 1963) is an Australian Liberal National politician who was the member of the Legislative Assembly of Queensland for Barron River from 2012 to 2015, having won the seat at the 2012 state election. On October 1, 2025, in the Cairns Magistrates Court, Trout pleaded guilty to causing affray, involving an attack on three innocent people on May 17, 2024, in a case of mistaken identity.

Parliament of Queensland
Preceded by Steve Wettenhall	Member for Barron River; 2012–2015	Succeeded by Craig Crawford
