= Bree James =

Australian politician

Bree James MP

Member of the Queensland Legislative Assembly for Barron River
- Incumbent
- Assumed office 26 October 2024
- Preceded by: Craig Crawford

Personal details
- Party: Liberal National

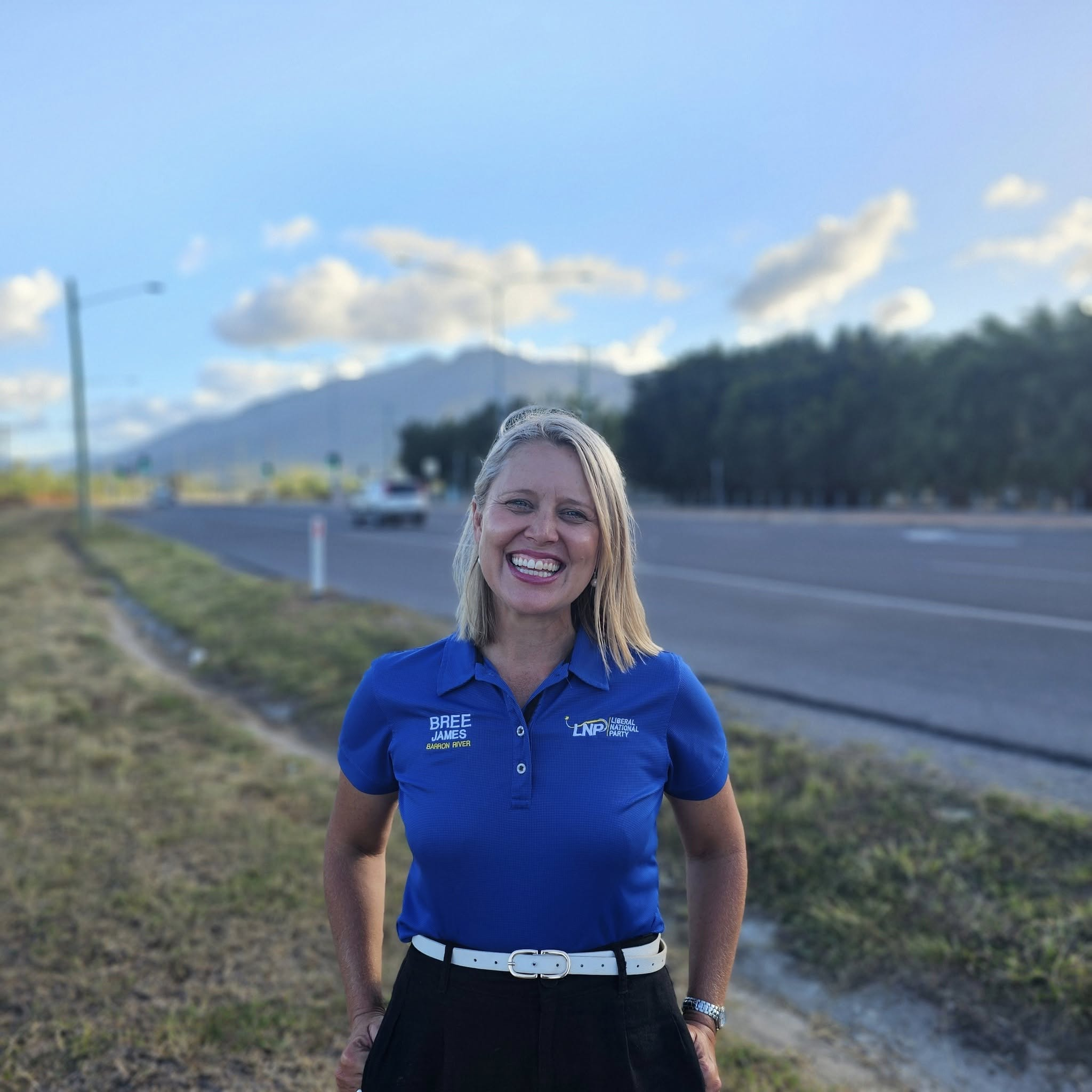
MP for Barron River Bree James during her election campaign. September 2024.

Bree James is an Australian politician. She was elected member of the Legislative Assembly of Queensland for Barron River in the 2024 Queensland state election, defeating sitting Labor MP Craig Crawford.

== Political career ==
Bree James was elected as the Member of Parliament (MP) for Barron River in the 2024 Queensland state election, representing the Liberal National Party of Queensland.

In the final days of the 2024 Queensland state election campaign, James made a joke on Facebook about her German heritage, standing next to a vandalised banner with a Hitler moustache, captioned "Even my banner is getting in the spirit and celebrating my German heritage".

James apologised for the post and subsequently deleted it. Liberal National leader and then-Opposition Leader David Crisafulli reprimanded her for the incident, while Anti-Defamation Commission chair Dvir Abramovich said it was "beyond a misguided joke" and "trivialised the atrocities of the Holocaust".

In November 2024, James was appointed as the Assistant Minister for Tourism, Early Learning, Creative Industries and Far North Queensland.

== Early years and business career ==
James was born in Coffs Harbour, New South Wales, Australia. She moved to Cairns in 2003 and started PakMag, a free parenting and children's magazine in 2007.

== Personal life ==
James is married and has two children. She resides in Cairns, Queensland, Australia.

== See also ==
- Barron River
- Queensland State Election, 2024
- Liberal National Party of Queensland

Parliament of Queensland
Preceded by Craig Crawford	Member for Barron River; 2024–present	Incumbent
