= Cecil Jesson =

Australian politician

Nugget Jesson
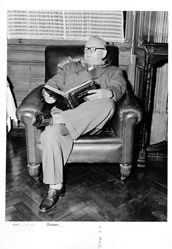

Member of the Queensland Legislative Assembly for Kennedy
- In office 11 May 1935 – 29 April 1950
- Preceded by: Arthur Fadden
- Succeeded by: Seat abolished

Assembly Member for Hinchinbrook
- In office 29 April 1950 – 28 May 1960
- Preceded by: New seat
- Succeeded by: John Row

Personal details
- Born: Cecil George Jesson; 7 July 1899 Sydney, New South Wales, Australia
- Died: 25 December 1961 (aged 62) Indooroopilly, Queensland, Australia
- Resting place: Toowong Cemetery
- Party: Labor
- Spouse(s): Dorothy J Harris (m.1922), Wilhelmina Mary Graham (m.1928 d.1975)
- Occupation: Auctioneer

Cecil George "Nugget" Jesson (7 July 1899 – 25 December 1961) was a member of the Queensland Legislative Assembly.

== Biography ==
Jesson was born in Sydney, New South Wales, the son of George Jesson and his wife Lillian Maude (née Jones). He married Dorothy J Harris in 1922 and they had one son. He then married Wilhelmina Mary Graham in 1928 and they had one son and four daughters.

He died in Brisbane on Christmas Day and was buried in the Toowong Cemetery.

== Public career ==
Jesson held the seat of Kennedy for the Labor Party in the Queensland Legislative Assembly from 1935 until 1950. He then held the new seat of Hinchinbrook from 1950 to 1960.

He was the government whip from 1950 until 1957 and opposition whip from 1957 to 1960.

Parliament of Queensland
Preceded by Arthur Fadden	Member for Kennedy; 1935–1950	Abolished
New seat	Member for Hinchinbrook; 1950–1960	Succeeded by John Row
