= Lesley Clark =

Australian politician

Member of the Queensland Legislative Assembly for Barron River
- In office 2 December 1989 – 15 July 1995
- Preceded by: Martin Tenni
- Succeeded by: Lyn Warwick
- In office 13 June 1998 – 9 September 2006
- Preceded by: Lyn Warwick
- Succeeded by: Steve Wettenhall

Personal details
- Born: 10 August 1948 (age 77) Harwich, Essex, England
- Party: Labor
- Occupation: Lecturer, School guidance officer

Lesley Ann Clark (born 10 August 1948) is a former Australian politician. Born in Harwich in the United Kingdom, she was a school guidance officer and lecturer in education at James Cook University in Queensland before entering politics. She sat on Mulgrave Shire Council from 1985 to 1990. In 1989, she was elected to the Legislative Assembly of Queensland as the Labor member for Barron River. She was defeated in 1995, but re-elected in 1998. Clark retired in 2006.

Parliament of Queensland
| Preceded by Martin Tenni | Member for Barron River; 1989–1995 | Succeeded by Lyn Warwick |
| Preceded by Lyn Warwick | Member for Barron River; 1998–2006 | Succeeded by Steve Wettenhall |
