= Trebonne State School =

Primary school in Queensland, Australia

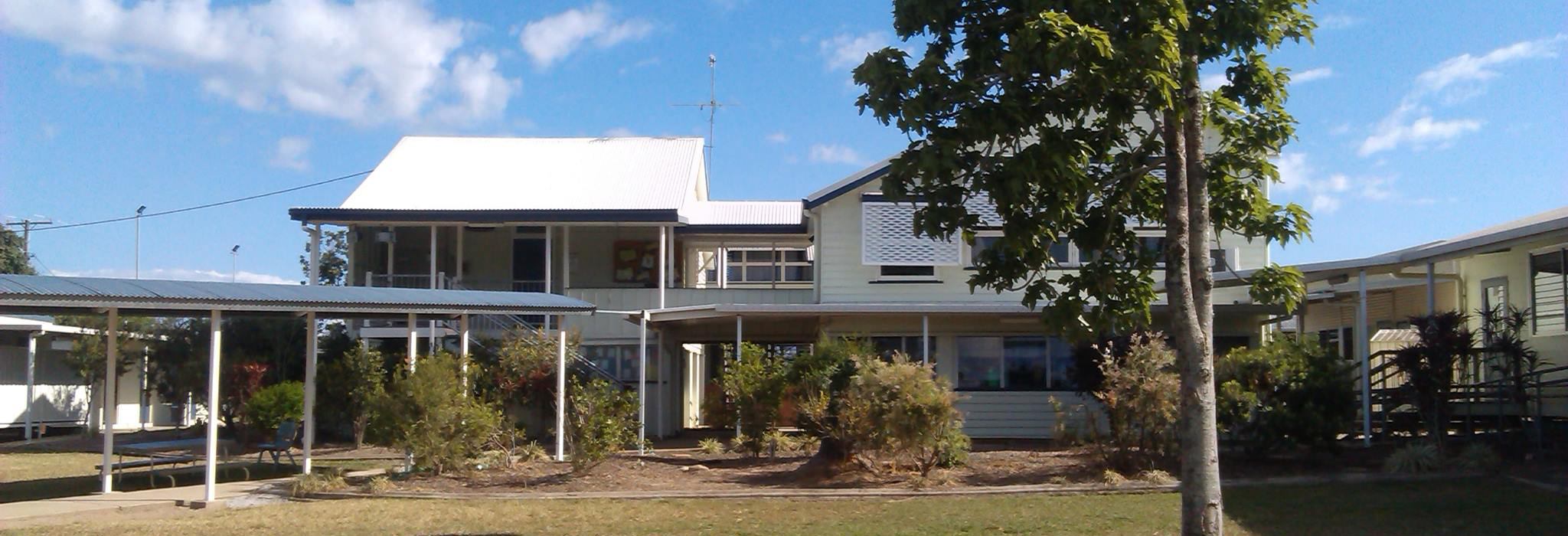
- Trebonne State School, 2024

Address
- 71 Stone River Road, Trebonne, Queensland, Australia
- Coordinates: 18.63043°S 146.07448°E

Information
- Former names: Upper Trebonne Provisional School, Upper Trebonne State School
- School type: Public, co-educational, primary
- Motto: Let us be Strong in Mind and Body
- Established: 1906
- Principal: Anne Bower
- Years offered: Prep – Year 6
- Enrolment: 10 (2023)
- Website: Official site

Trebonne State School is a public co-educational primary school located in the town of Trebonne, Queensland, Australia. It is administered by the Queensland Department of Education, with an enrolment of 10 students and a teaching staff of two, as of 2023. The school serves students from Prep through to Year 6. Due to the school's low enrollment figures, the school collaborates with a number of other schools within the region on curriculum development and in inter-school sporting events.

== History ==
A tender of £142 was accepted by the Government for the erection of the school in June 1906. The school opened on 7 November 1906 as a provisional school, named as Upper Trebonne Provisional School and became a state school in 1909, which changed its name to Upper Trebonne State School. It was renamed to its current name in 1932.

In October 1909, it was announced that Alfred Herbert Anderson would be transferred from Apple Tree Creek to the school to become the foundation principal. He was transferred from the school to the Department of Justice in 1911 as the acting clerk of petty sessions, and by 1912, he was the deputy land commissioner and acting land agent for the Winter Land Agent's district.

In 1946, the closed Elphinstone Pocket State School building at Abergowrie was relocated to Trebonne State School.

== Demographics ==
In 2023, the school had a student enrolment of 10 with two teachers (1.3 full-time equivalent) and six non-teaching staff (1.9 full-time equivalent). Female enrolments consisted of five students and Male enrolments consisted of five students; Indigenous enrolments accounted for a total of 0% and 13% of students had a language background other than English.

== Notable alumni ==
- John Row, politician
- Ted Row, politician

== See also ==
- Education in Queensland
- List of schools in North Queensland
