= Bjelke-Petersen ministry =

Former Queensland ministry

Bjelke-Petersen Ministry
- 39th, 40th, 41st, 42nd, 43rd, 44th, 45th, 46th Cabinet of Queensland

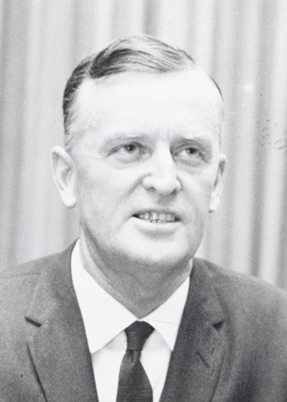
- Joh Bjelke-Petersen, 1968. (Premier)
- Date formed: 8 August 1968
- Date dissolved: 1 December 1987

People and organisations
- Monarch: Elizabeth II
- Governor: Walter Campbell (1985–1992); James Ramsay (1977–1985); Colin Hannah (1972–1977); Alan Mansfield (1966–1972)
- No. of ministers: 13–22
- Member party: National (Note: When the ministry was sworn in, the party's name was known as the "Country Party". After undergoing two changes, the party was known as the "National Party" by the time the cabinet was dissolved.)
- Status in legislature: Majority government 49 / 89
- Opposition party: Labor
- Opposition leader: Nev Warburton (1984–1988); Keith Wright (1982–1984); Ed Casey (1978–1982); Tom Burns (1974–1978); Perc Tucker (1974); Jack Houston (1966–1974)

History
- Outgoing election: 1986 Queensland state election
- Legislature term: 1968–1987
- Predecessor: Chalk
- Successor: Ahern

The Bjelke-Petersen Ministry was a ministry of the Government of Queensland and was led by Premier Joh Bjelke-Petersen, who led the Country Party and its successor, the National Party. It succeeded the Chalk Ministry on 8 August 1968 as part of a series of events following the death of former Premier Jack Pizzey on 31 July. It was succeeded by the Ahern Ministry on 1 December 1987 following Bjelke-Petersen's resignation as Premier.

All lists below are ordered by decreasing seniority within the Cabinet, as indicated by the Government Gazette and the Hansard index. Blue entries indicate members of the Liberal Party, while non-shaded entries indicate members of the Country or National Party.

== First ministry ==
The first Bjelke-Petersen ministry was sworn in by Governor Alan Mansfield on 8 August 1968, and served until the reconstitution of the Ministry on 29 May 1969. It was almost unchanged from the Pizzey Ministry and Chalk Ministry. Max Hodges was appointed to fill the cabinet vacancy caused by Jack Pizzey's death, and the roles vacated by Bjelke-Petersen on becoming Premier.

Office	Minister
Premier; Minister for State Development	Joh Bjelke-Petersen
Deputy Premier; Treasurer	Gordon Chalk
Minister for Mines; Minister for Main Roads; Minister for Electricity	Ron Camm
Attorney-General; Minister for Justice	Peter Delamothe, OBE, MBBS
Minister for Education; Minister for Cultural Activities	Alan Fletcher
Minister for Local Government and Conservation	Harold Richter
Minister for Primary Industries	John Row
Minister for Health	Douglas Tooth
Minister for Labour and Tourism	John Herbert
Minister for Transport	William Knox
Minister for Industrial Development	Fred Campbell
Minister for Lands	Vic Sullivan
Minister for Works; Minister for Housing	Max Hodges

== Second ministry ==
On 29 May 1969, following the 1969 election on 17 May, the Ministry was reconstituted by the Administrator, William Mack, due to the Governor's absence, and served until the next reconstitution of the ministry on 20 June 1972. There were almost no changes—Harold Richter retired from politics, and Nev Hewitt was appointed to the resulting cabinet vacancy. On 4 September 1969, the cabinet was expanded from 13 to 14 members, and Wally Rae was appointed.

On 19 December 1971, Peter Delamothe, the Attorney-General and Minister for Justice, resigned to take up an appointment as Agent-General of Queensland. His position in the ministry was left vacant for the remainder of the term, while William Knox was appointed to his former roles.

Office	Minister
Premier; Minister for State Development	Joh Bjelke-Petersen
Deputy Premier; Treasurer	Gordon Chalk
Minister for Mines; Minister for Main Roads; Minister for Electricity (until 4 September 1969)	Ron Camm
Attorney-General; Minister for Justice	Peter Delamothe, OBE, MBBS (until 19 December 1971)
Minister for Education; Minister for Cultural Activities	Alan Fletcher
Minister for Primary Industries	John Row
Minister for Health	Douglas Tooth
Minister for Labour and Tourism	John Herbert
Minister for Transport; Attorney-General (from 20 December 1971); Minister for Justice (from 20 December 1971)	William Knox
Minister for Industrial Development	Fred Campbell
Minister for Lands	Vic Sullivan
Minister for Works; Minister for Housing	Max Hodges
Minister for Local Government and Marine Activities (until 4 September 1969); Minister for Conservation, Marine and Aboriginal Affairs (from 4 September 1969)	Nev Hewitt
Minister for Local Government; Minister for Electricity	Wally Rae (from 4 September 1969)

== Third ministry ==
On 20 June 1972, following the 1972 election on 27 May, the Ministry was reconstituted by the Governor, Sir Colin Hannah, and served until the next reconstitution of the ministry on 23 December 1974. John Row retired from Parliament, and a further cabinet vacancy existed due to Delamothe's departure in December 1971. Keith Hooper and Henry McKechnie were appointed to fill the vacancies.

Office	Minister
Premier	Joh Bjelke-Petersen
Deputy Premier; Treasurer	Sir Gordon Chalk, K.B.E.
Minister for Mines; Minister for Main Roads	Ron Camm
Attorney-General; Minister for Justice	William Knox
Minister for Education; Minister for Cultural Activities	Sir Alan Fletcher
Minister for Health	Douglas Tooth
Minister for Tourism, Sport and Welfare Services	John Herbert
Minister for Development and Industrial Affairs	Fred Campbell
Minister for Primary Industries	Vic Sullivan
Minister for Works; Minister for Housing	Max Hodges
Minister for Conservation, Marine and Aboriginal Affairs	Nev Hewitt, M.M., A.F.M.
Minister for Lands and Forestry	Wally Rae
Minister for Transport	Keith Hooper
Minister for Local Government and Electricity	Henry McKechnie (until 24 October 1974)
Minister for Local Government and Electricity	Russ Hinze (from 24 October 1974)

== Fourth ministry ==
On 23 December 1974, following the 1974 election on 7 December, the Ministry was reconstituted, and served until a reshuffle on 13 August 1976. Sir Alan Fletcher and Douglas Tooth retired from politics and left the ministry, while Wally Rae was appointed Agent-General of Queensland on 6 December. They were replaced by Tom Newbery, Ken Tomkins and Llew Edwards.

On 10 March 1975, the ministry grew from 14 to 18 offices.

Office	Minister
Premier	Joh Bjelke-Petersen
Deputy Premier; Treasurer	Sir Gordon Chalk, K.B.E., LL.D.
Minister for Mines and Energy	Ron Camm
Attorney-General; Minister for Justice	William Knox
Minister for Community and Welfare Services; Minister for Sport	John Herbert
Minister for Industrial Development; Minister for Labour Relations and Consumer Affairs	Fred Campbell
Minister for Primary Industries; Minister for Fisheries (until 25 March 1975)	Vic Sullivan
Minister for Police; Minister for Works (until 10 March 1975); Minister for Housing (until 10 March 1975)	Max Hodges
Minister for Water Resources; Minister for Marine Services (until 10 March 1975); Minister for Aboriginal and Islanders Advancement (until 10 March 1975)	Nev Hewitt, M.M., A.F.M.
Minister for Transport	Keith Hooper
Minister for Local Government; Minister for Main Roads	Russ Hinze
Minister for Tourism; Minister for Education (until 10 March 1975); Minister for Cultural Activities (until 10 March 1975); Minister for Marine Services (from 10 March 1975)	Tom Newbery
Minister for Lands and Forestry; Minister for National Parks and Wildlife Service	Ken Tomkins
Minister for Health	Llew Edwards, MBBS
Minister for Education; Minister for Cultural Activities	Val Bird (from 10 March 1975)
Minister for Works; Minister for Housing	Norm Lee (from 10 March 1975)
Minister for Aboriginal and Islanders Advancement; Minister for Fisheries (from 25 March 1975)	Claude Wharton (from 10 March 1975)
Minister for Survey, Valuation and Urban & Regional Affairs	Bill Lickiss, Q.G.M. (from 10 March 1975)

=== Reconstitution ===
On 13 August 1976, Deputy Premier and Liberal leader Sir Gordon Chalk resigned, resulting in a reshuffle. William Knox replaced Chalk in his roles, while John Greenwood was appointed to the vacant position in the ministry.

Keith Hooper, Minister for Transport and Liberal member for Greenslopes, died on 23 August 1977. Fred Campbell added Transport to his roles for the remainder of the parliamentary term.

Office	Minister
Premier	Joh Bjelke-Petersen
Deputy Premier; Treasurer	William Knox
Minister for Mines and Energy	Ron Camm
Minister for Community and Welfare Services; Minister for Sport	John Herbert
Minister for Industrial Development; Minister for Labour Relations and Consumer Affairs; Minister for Transport (from 26 August 1977)	Fred Campbell
Minister for Primary Industries	Vic Sullivan
Minister for Tourism; Minister for Marine Services	Max Hodges
Minister for Water Resources	Nev Hewitt, M.M., A.F.M.
Minister for Transport	Keith Hooper (died 23 August 1977)
Minister for Local Government; Minister for Main Roads	Russ Hinze
Minister for Police	Tom Newbery
Minister for Lands and Forestry; Minister for National Parks and Wildlife Service	Ken Tomkins
Minister for Health	Llew Edwards, MBBS
Minister for Education; Minister for Cultural Activities	Val Bird
Minister for Works; Minister for Housing	Norm Lee
Minister for Aboriginal and Islanders Advancement; Minister for Fisheries	Claude Wharton
Attorney-General Minister for Justice	Bill Lickiss, Q.G.M.
Minister for Survey, Valuation and Urban & Regional Affairs	John Greenwood, BA, LL.B.

== Fifth Ministry ==
On 16 December 1977, following the 1977 election on 12 November, the Ministry was reconstituted. Due to the death of Keith Hooper on 23 August 1977, there was a vacancy in the outgoing ministry, to which Charles Porter was appointed.

A number of minor changes occurred:

- John Herbert resigned from Parliament on 13 September 1978 due to terminally ill health. Sam Doumany was appointed to replace him in the cabinet and as Minister for Welfare on 2 October 1978.
- On 9 October 1978, Llew Edwards replaced William Knox as leader of the Liberal Party and hence Deputy Premier of Queensland. On 15 December 1978, they swapped portfolios, with Knox becoming Minister for Health and Edwards becoming Treasurer.
- On 31 July 1979, Max Hodges resigned from Parliament, and on 21 August 1978, Tom Newbery resigned from the ministry. Max Hooper and Ivan Gibbs were appointed to replace them in cabinet and in their roles on 24 August 1978.
- On 17 August 1980, Ron Camm resigned from Parliament to become chairman of the Sugar Board. Russ Hinze and Vic Sullivan added his cabinet roles to their responsibilities, while Mike Ahern was appointed to the cabinet vacancy.

Office	Minister
Premier	Joh Bjelke-Petersen
Deputy Premier (until 9 October 1978); Treasurer (until 15 December 1978); Minister for Health (from 15 December 1978)	William Knox
Minister for Mines and Energy; Minister for Police; Minister for Maritime Services (1–24 August 1980); Minister for Tourism (1–24 August 1980)	Ron Camm (until 17 July 1980)
Minister for Labour Relations	Fred Campbell
Minister for Welfare	John Herbert
Minister for Primary Industries (until 17 July 1980); Minister for Mines and Energy (from 17 July 1980)	Vic Sullivan
Minister for Maritime Services; Minister for Tourism	Max Hodges (until 31 July 1979)
Minister for Lands and Forestry; Minister for Water Resources	Nev Hewitt, M.M., A.F.M.
Minister for Local Government; Minister for Main Roads; Minister for Police (from 17 July 1980)	Russ Hinze
Minister for Culture, National Parks and Recreation	Tom Newbery (until 21 August 1979)
Minister for Transport	Ken Tomkins
Minister for Health (until 15 December 1978); Deputy Premier (from 9 October 1978); Treasurer (from 15 December 1978)	Llew Edwards, MBBS
Minister for Education	Val Bird
Minister for Industry and Administrative Services	Norm Lee
Minister for Works; Minister for Housing	Claude Wharton
Attorney-General; Minister for Justice; Minister for Welfare (14 September—2 October 1978)	Bill Lickiss
Minister for Survey, Valuation	John Greenwood, BA, LL.B.
Minister for Aboriginal and Island Affairs	Charles Porter
Minister for Welfare	Sam Doumany (from 2 October 1978)
Minister for Maritime Services; Minister for Tourism	Max Hooper (from 24 August 1979)
Minister for Culture, National Parks and Recreation	Ivan Gibbs (from 24 August 1979)
Minister for Primary Industries	Mike Ahern (from 17 July 1980)

== Eighth Ministry ==
On 1 December 1986, following the 1986 election on 1 November, the Ministry was reconstituted by the Governor, Walter Campbell, and served until the Ahern Ministry was sworn in on 1 December 1987. Neil Turner left Parliament, and Paul Clauson was appointed to the resulting cabinet vacancy. As with the Seventh Ministry, all cabinet members were members of the National Party.

On 25 November 1987, Bjelke-Petersen dismissed three ministers and appointed replacements. The following day, a meeting of 48 of the 49 National members was convened, and a spill motion was carried 39–8, after which a ballot was held for the leadership, which was won by Mike Ahern. Ahern phoned the Governor and arranged to forward a document signed by 47 members to Government House supporting his leadership. On 1 December, after significant pressure and realising his position, Bjelke-Petersen resigned, and an hour later, all ministers' commissions were terminated and a two-man Ahern Ministry was sworn in.

Office	Minister
Premier; Treasurer	Sir Joh Bjelke-Petersen, KCMG
Deputy Premier; Minister Assisting the Treasurer; Minister for Police	Bill Gunn
Minister for Local Government; Minister for Main Roads; Minister for Racing	Russ Hinze
Minister for Works; Minister for Housing; Minister for Industry (from 25 November 1987)	Ivan Gibbs
Minister for Health; Minister for the Environment	Mike Ahern, BAgrSc (until 25 November 1987)
Minister for Transport	Don Lane
Minister for Lands, Forestry, Mapping and Surveying	Bill Glasson
Minister for Mines and Energy; Minister for the Arts	Brian Austin (until 25 November 1987)
Minister for Education; Minister for Training and Technology (from 25 November 1987)	Lin Powell
Minister for Employment, Small Business and Industrial Affairs	Vince Lester
Minister for Water Resources and Maritime Services	Martin Tenni
Minister for Primary Industries	Neville Harper
Minister for Tourism, National Parks and Sport	Geoff Muntz
Minister for Industry and Technology	Peter McKechnie (until 25 November 1987)
Minister for Northern Development and Community Services	Bob Katter
Minister for Family Services, Youth and Ethnic Affairs	Yvonne Chapman
Minister for Corrective Services, Administrative Services and Valuation	Don Neal
Attorney-General; Minister for Justice	Paul Clauson
Minister for Mines and Energy; Minister for the Arts	Gordon Simpson (from 25 November 1987)
Minister for Health; Minister for the Environment	Kev Lingard, BA, Dip.Ed. (from 25 November 1987)

== Notes ==
Preceded by Chalk Ministry	Bjelke-Petersen Ministry; 1968–1987	Succeeded by Ahern Ministry
