= Ted Row =

Australian politician

Member of the Queensland Legislative Assembly for Hinchinbrook
- In office 27 May 1972 – 2 December 1989
- Preceded by: John Row
- Succeeded by: Marc Rowell

Personal details
- Born: Edward Charles Row; 26 March 1923 Ingham, Queensland, Australia
- Died: 4 July 2007 (aged 84) Oxley, Queensland, Australia
- Resting place: Brookfield Cemetery
- Party: Country Party/National Party
- Spouse: Constance Battie (m.1950
- Relations: Sir John Row (uncle)

Edward Charles "Ted" Row (26 March 1923 – 4 July 2007) was an Australian politician.

== Early life ==
Row was born in Ingham to Edward Dunlop Row and Ida Jesse, née Kilpatrick. He was educated at Trebonne State School and then Queensland Agricultural High School.

== Politics ==
A canegrower, he served on Hinchinbrook Shire Council from 1962 to 1972. In 1972 he was elected to the Queensland Legislative Assembly as the National Party member for Hinchinbrook, succeeding his uncle, John Row. Although he never sat on the front bench, he did serve as Chairman of Committees from 1983. Row continued as an MP until his retirement in 1989.

== Later life ==
Row died in Oxley in 2007 and was buried in Brookfield Cemetery.

Parliament of Queensland
Preceded by John Row	Member for Hinchinbrook; 1972–1989	Succeeded by Marc Rowell
