= Andrew Cripps =

Australian politician

Shadow Minister for Natural Resources and Mines, Shadow Minister for Northern Development
- In office 14 February 2015 – 25 November 2017
- Leader: Lawrence Springborg; Tim Nicholls
- Preceded by: Anthony Lynham
- Succeeded by: Dale Last

Minister for Natural Resources and Mines of Queensland
- In office 3 April 2012 – 14 February 2015
- Premier: Campbell Newman
- Preceded by: Rachel Nolan (Natural Resources); Stirling Hinchliffe (Mining)
- Succeeded by: Anthony Lynham

Member of the Queensland Parliament for Hinchinbrook
- In office 9 September 2006 – 25 November 2017
- Preceded by: Marc Rowell
- Succeeded by: Nick Dametto

Personal details
- Born: 5 February 1981 (age 45) Tully, Queensland, Australia
- Party: Liberal National Party

Andrew Peter Cripps (born 5 February 1981) is an Australian politician who was a member of the Legislative Assembly of Queensland from 2006 to 2017 and served as Minister for Natural Resources and Mines. In October 2018 he was elected to the Shire of Hinchinbrook Council, where he currently serves as Deputy Mayor.

He was born in Tully, Queensland, Australia, and was elected for The Nationals in September 2006 to represent Hinchinbrook, replacing the retiring National Party MP, Marc Rowell. Cripps was re-elected in 2009 for Liberal National Party following the merger of the Liberal Party and The Nationals in Queensland.

From 27 November 2010, Cripps was the Shadow Minister for North Queensland, Reef Protection and Aboriginal & Torres Strait Islander Economic Development and the Shadow Minister for Public Works. Following a reshuffle, he was appointed Shadow Minister for Agriculture and North Queensland. Cripps had previously been the Shadow Minister for Disability Services and Multicultural Affairs (6 April 2009 – 26 November 2010), Shadow Minister for Natural Resources and Water (30 September 2008 – 5 April 2009), Shadow Parliamentary Secretary for Infrastructure and Planning (29 January 2008 – 12 August 2008) and Shadow Parliamentary Secretary for Mines and Energy (21 September 2006 – 29 January 2008).

Cripps served on the Law, Justice and Safety Committee (from 23 April 2009) and was a member of the Legal, Constitutional and Administrative Review Committee (23 April 2009 – 28 May 2009), and the Health Quality and Complaints Commission Select Committee (1 July 2007 – 15 November 2007) of the Queensland Parliament. On 9 September 2008, he became one of the sitting members of the Liberal National Party of Queensland.

Before his election, Cripps was a Queensland state president of the Young Nationals and worked as Rowell's electorate officer.

In 2021, Cripps was selected to the Liberal National Party Senate ticket to contest the 2022 federal election, alongside James McGrath, Matt Canavan and Amanda Stoker.

== Political history ==
- Joined the Queensland Young Nationals in 2001
- Chairman of the Greater Brisbane Young Nationals (2001–2003)
- Secretary of the Cairns–Innisfail Young Nationals (2005–2006)
- Delegate to Conference and Central Council of The Nationals—Queensland (2003)
- Member of The Nationals–Queensland State Management Committee (2003)
- State President of the Queensland Young Nationals (2004–2006)

Parliament of Queensland
Preceded by Marc Rowell	Member for Hinchinbrook; 2006–2017	Succeeded by Nick Dametto
