= Marc Rowell =

Australian politician (1938–2018)

Member of the Queensland Legislative Assembly for Hinchinbrook
- In office 2 December 1989 – 9 September 2006
- Preceded by: Ted Row
- Succeeded by: Andrew Cripps

Personal details
- Born: Marcus Hosking Rowell; 5 April 1938 Beecroft, New South Wales, Australia
- Died: 13 April 2018 (aged 80)
- Party: National Party
- Relations: Sugarcane grower

Marcus Hosking "Marc" Rowell (5 April 1938 – 13 April 2018) was an Australian politician. Born in Beecroft, New South Wales, he was a cane farmer and fruit grower in Queensland before entering politics. In 1989, he was elected to the Legislative Assembly of Queensland as the National Party member for Hinchinbrook. In 1998, he was appointed Minister for Primary Industries, Fisheries and Forestry, but lost the position when the Coalition was defeated at elections later that year. Rowell held various posts in the shadow ministry but retired at the 2006 state election.

Parliament of Queensland
Preceded by Ted Row	Member for Hinchinbrook; 1989–2006	Succeeded by Andrew Cripps
