= Rachel Nolan =

Australian politician (born 1974)

The Hon Rachel Nolan
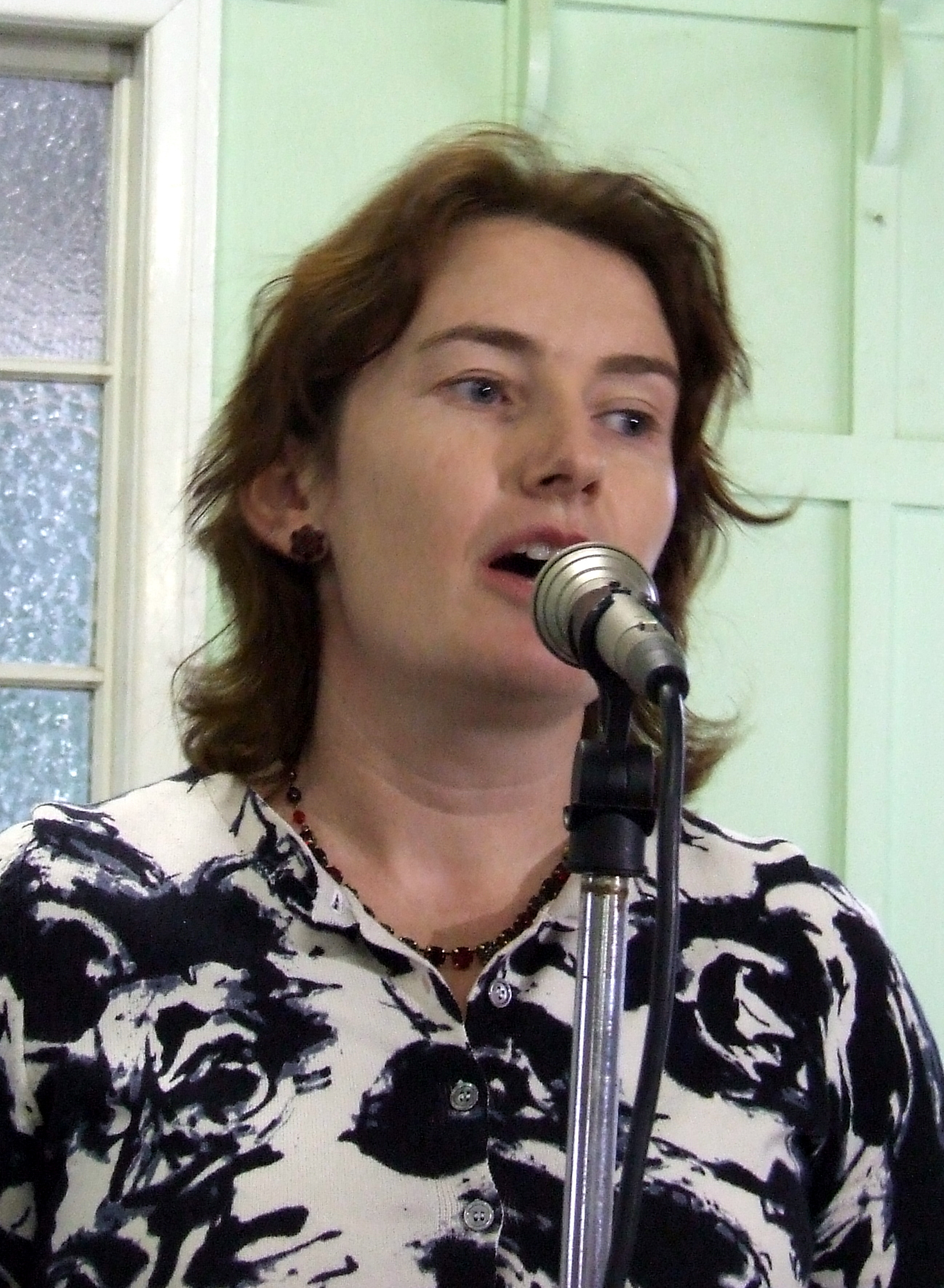
- Nolan in September 2010

Minister for Finance and The Arts of Queensland
- In office 21 February 2011 – 26 March 2012
- Premier: Anna Bligh
- Preceded by: Office created (Finance) Anna Bligh (Arts)
- Succeeded by: Tim Nicholls (Finance) Ros Bates (Arts)

Minister for Natural Resources of Queensland
- In office 22 June 2011 – 26 March 2012
- Premier: Anna Bligh
- Preceded by: Kate Jones
- Succeeded by: Andrew Cripps

Minister for Transport of Queensland
- In office 26 March 2009 – 21 February 2011
- Premier: Anna Bligh
- Preceded by: Paul Lucas
- Succeeded by: Annastacia Palaszczuk

Member of the Queensland Parliament for Ipswich
- In office 17 February 2001 – 24 March 2012
- Preceded by: David Hamill
- Succeeded by: Ian Berry

Personal details
- Born: Rachel Genevieve Nolan; 13 March 1974 (age 52) Ipswich, Queensland, Australia
- Party: Labor
- Education: University of Queensland
- Occupation: Political advisor

Rachel Genevieve Nolan (born 1974) is an Australian former politician. She was elected as the state member for Ipswich on 17 February 2001. At the time she was Queensland's youngest ever female MP. She held the seat until 26 March 2012.

Nolan was educated at the Ipswich Girls' Grammar School, in Ipswich, Queensland. Prior to entering Parliament she worked as a political adviser to the Northern Territory's then Leader of the Opposition and the Queensland Labor Government.

In October 2006 Nolan was recognised as the University of Queensland's Young Alumnus of the Year.

Anna Bligh appointed Nolan Parliamentary Secretary to the Minister for Communities, Disability Services, Aboriginal and Torres Strait Island Partnerships, Multicultural Affairs, Seniors and Youth (Lindy Nelson-Carr) in her first Ministry. Following the March 2009 state election, she was promoted to Minister for Transport. Then, in the February 2011 reshuffle, she was given the new post of Minister of Finance and received Bligh's Arts portfolio as well. When Kate Jones resigned from Cabinet to concentrate on defending her seat of Ashgrove against LNP leader Campbell Newman, Nolan was assigned the additional brief of National Resources.

Nolan was defeated in the 2012 Queensland Government election by liberal candidate for Ipswich, Ian Berry.

Parliament of Queensland
Preceded by David Hamill	Member for Ipswich; 2001–2012	Succeeded by Ian Berry
Political offices
Preceded by John Mickel	Minister for Transport; 2009–2011	Succeeded by Annastacia Palaszczuk
New ministry	Minister for Finance; 2011–2012	Succeeded by Tim Nicholls
Preceded by Anna Bligh	Minister for the Arts; 2011–2012	Succeeded by Ros Bates
Preceded by Kate Jones as Resource Management	Minister for Natural Resources; 2011–2012	Succeeded by Andrew Cripps
