= Lyn Warwick =

Australian politician

Member of the Queensland Legislative Assembly for Barron River
- In office 15 July 1995 – 13 June 1998
- Preceded by: Lesley Clark
- Succeeded by: Lesley Clark

Personal details
- Born: 21 October 1946 (age 79) Cairns, Queensland, Australia
- Party: Liberal Party
- Occupation: Cairns Regional Manager - National Heart Foundation

Lynette Robyn Warwick (born 21 October 1946) is a former Australian politician.

She was born in Cairns and worked as the Cairns regional manager of the National Heart Foundation before entering politics. A Liberal Party member who served as vice-chairman of her local branch, she was elected to the Queensland Legislative Assembly in 1995 as the member for Barron River. In 1997 she was appointed Parliamentary Secretary to the Joint Coalition parties, but in 1998 she lost her seat to the Labor member she had defeated in 1995.

Parliament of Queensland
Preceded by Lesley Clark	Member for Barron River; 1995–1998	Succeeded by Lesley Clark
