= Chalk ministry =

The Chalk Ministry was the 38th ministry of the Government of Queensland and was led by Liberal Party Premier Gordon Chalk. It succeeded the Pizzey Ministry on 2 August 1968 following Pizzey's unexpected death on 31 July, and was sworn in by Governor Alan Mansfield as a temporary measure until the Country Party, the dominant coalition partner, could elect a leader. It did so and on 8 August 1968, Joh Bjelke-Petersen became leader and Premier of Queensland, and the Bjelke-Petersen Ministry was constituted.

Blue entries indicate members of the Liberal Party, while the others were members of the Country Party.

| Office | Minister |
|---|---|
| Premier; Minister for State Development; Treasurer | Gordon Chalk |
| Deputy Premier; Minister for Works; Minister for Housing | Joh Bjelke-Petersen |
| Attorney-General; Minister for Justice | Peter Delamothe |
| Minister for Education; Minister for Cultural Activities | Alan Fletcher |
| Minister for Local Government and Conservation | Harold Richter |
| Minister for Primary Industries | John Row |
| Minister for Health | Douglas Tooth |
| Minister for Labour and Tourism | John Herbert |
| Minister for Mines; Minister for Main Roads; Minister for Electricity | Ron Camm |
| Minister for Transport | William Knox |
| Minister for Industrial Development | Fred Campbell |
| Minister for Lands | Vic Sullivan |

| Preceded by Pizzey Ministry | Chalk Ministry; 1968 (August) | Succeeded by Bjelke-Petersen Ministry |
