= Pizzey ministry =

- 37th Cabinet of Queensland

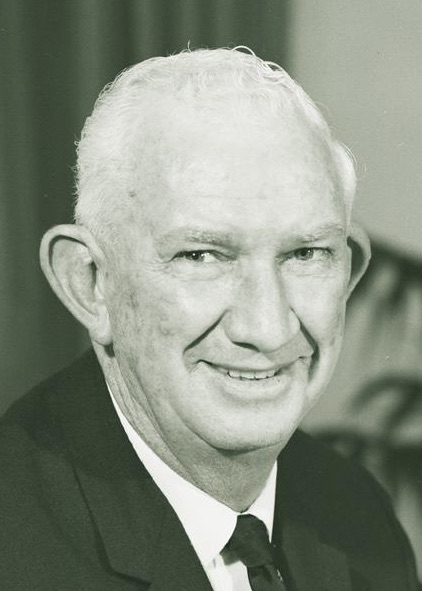
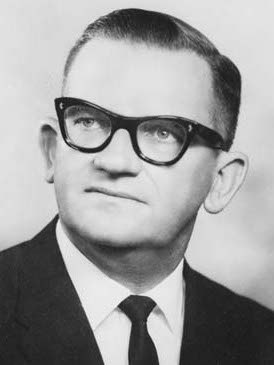
- Jack Pizzey (Premier) Gordon Chalk (Deputy Premier)
- Date formed: 17 January 1968
- Date dissolved: 1 August 1968 (197 days)

People and organisations
- Monarch: Elizabeth II
- Governor: Alan Mansfield
- No. of ministers: 13
- Member party: Country–Liberal Coalition
- Status in legislature: Majority government 47 / 78
- Opposition party: Labor
- Opposition leader: Jack Houston

History
- Legislature term: 1966–1969
- Predecessor: Nicklin IX ministry
- Successor: Chalk ministry (interim)

The Pizzey Ministry was the 37th ministry of the Government of Queensland and was led by Country Party Premier Jack Pizzey and Liberal Deputy Premier Gordon Chalk. It succeeded the Nicklin ministry, led by Premier and Country Party leader Frank Nicklin, the longest serving cabinet in Queensland history, at that point. It was preceded by a Gordon Chalk-led interim ministry, the second-shortest cabinet in Queensland history, by length of duration. The Pizzey ministry itself lasted for 197 days, coming to an end following the death of Country Party leader and Premier Jack Pizzey.

== Cabinet ==
Portfolio	Minister	Took office	Left office	Party
Department of the Premier and Cabinet
Premier, Minister for State Development	Jack Pizzey	17 January 1968	31 July 1968	Country
Deputy Premier	Gordon Chalk	17 January 1968	31 July 1968	Liberal
Treasury
Treasurer	Gordon Chalk	17 January 1968	31 July 1968	Liberal
Department of Works and Housing
Minister for Works and Housing	Joh Bjelke-Petersen	17 January 1968	31 July 1968	Country
Department of Justice and Attorney-General
Minister for Justice and Attorney-General	Peter Delamothe	17 January 1968	31 July 1968	Liberal
Department of Education
Minister for Education and Cultural Affairs	Alan Fletcher	17 January 1968	31 July 1968	Country
Outer Ministry
Minister for Local Government and Conservation	Harold Richter	17 January 1968	31 July 1968	Country
Minister for Primary Industries	John Row	17 January 1968	31 July 1968	Country
Minister for Health	Douglas Tooth	17 January 1968	31 July 1968	Liberal
Minister for Labour and Tourism	John Herbert	17 January 1968	31 July 1968	Liberal
Minister for Mines, Main Roads and Electricity	Ron Camm	17 January 1968	31 July 1968	Country
Minister for Transport	William Knox	17 January 1968	31 July 1968	Liberal
Minister for Industrial Development	Fred Campbell	17 January 1968	31 July 1968	Liberal
Minister for Lands	Vic Sullivan	17 January 1968	31 July 1968	Country

Preceded by Nicklin IX ministry	Pizzey ministry 1968 (Jan–Jul)	Succeeded by Chalk ministry (interim)
