= Ahern ministry =

Government of Queensland, Australia

The Ahern Ministry was a ministry of the Australian Government of Queensland and was led by National Party Premier Mike Ahern and Deputy Premier Bill Gunn. It succeeded the Bjelke-Petersen Ministry on 1 December 1987 following Joh Bjelke-Petersen's resignation as Premier and from Parliament, and was in turn succeeded by the Cooper Ministry on 25 September 1989, led by Russell Cooper.

As the National Party was not in coalition at the time, all listed members are from that party.

== Two-man ministry ==
Due to the speed of the unusual events leading to the demise of the previous ministry, the initial Ahern Ministry consisted simply of Ahern and Gunn sharing all of the portfolios until a full Cabinet could be appointed and details of all other administrative arrangements could be finalised. It was sworn in by Governor Walter Campbell on 1 December 1987. The appointments of all previous ministers were terminated.

Office	Minister
Premier; Treasurer; Minister for Local Government; Minister for Main Roads; Minister for Racing; Minister for Transport; Minister for Education, Training and Technology; Minister for Water Resources and Maritime Services; Minister for Tourism, National Parks and Sport; Minister for Family Services, Youth and Ethnic Affairs; Minister for Justice; Attorney-General; Minister for Health; Minister for the Environment	Mike Ahern, BAgrSc
Deputy Premier; Minister Assisting the Treasurer; Minister for Police; Minister for Works; Minister for Housing; Minister for Industry; Minister for Lands, Forestry, Mapping and Surveying; Minister for Employment, Small Business and Industrial Affairs; Minister for Primary Industries; Minister for Northern Development; Minister for Community Services; Minister for Corrective Services; Minister for Administrative Services and Valuation; Minister for Mines and Energy; Minister for the Arts	Bill Gunn

== Full ministry ==
A full ministry was sworn in on 9 December 1987. The Ministry largely reflected the membership and order of the Bjelke-Petersen Ministry prior to 25 November 1987, but Russ Hinze, Don Lane, Lin Powell (who had been elected Speaker on 2 December) and Yvonne Chapman were not re-appointed. Five new ministers were appointed to fill the vacancies.

On 19 January 1989, Ahern reshuffled the ministry, removing Leisha Harvey and appointing Craig Sherrin to replace her.

In August 1989, Russell Cooper nominated to replace Ahern at a party-room meeting, with Paul Clauson as his deputy. The bid failed, and both ministers and Bob Katter resigned on 29 August. On 31 August, a reshuffle took place and three new ministers were appointed. This final version of the ministry lasted until a second attempt by Cooper to gain the leadership was successful on 25 September.

Office	Minister
Premier; Treasurer; Minister for State Development (from 19 January 1989); Minister for the Arts	Mike Ahern, BAgrSc
Deputy Premier; Minister for Works; Minister for Housing (from 19 January 1989); Minister for Main Roads and Expo; Minister for Police (until 19 January 1989)	Bill Gunn
Minister for Transport (until 19 January 1989); Minister for Health (from 19 January 1989)	Ivan Gibbs
Minister for Land Management	Bill Glasson
Minister for Finance; Minister Assisting the Premier and Treasurer	Brian Austin
Minister for Employment, Training and Industrial Affairs	Vince Lester
Minister for Mines and Energy; Minister for Northern Development (from 19 January 1989)	Martin Tenni
Minister for Primary Industries	Neville Harper
Minister for the Environment and Conservation; Minister for Tourism (until 19 January 1989); Minister for Forestry (from 19 January 1989)	Geoff Muntz
Minister for Family Services, Welfare and Housing (until 19 January 1989); Minister for Transport (from 19 January 1989)	Peter McKechnie
Minister for Northern Development (until 19 January 1989); Minister for Community Services and Ethnic Affairs	Bob Katter
Minister for Water Resources and Maritime Services	Don Neal
Attorney-General; Minister for Justice; Minister for Corrective Services (from 19 January 1989)	Paul Clauson
Minister for Industry, Small Business and Technology; Minister for Tourism (from 19 January 1989)	Rob Borbidge
Minister for Local Government; Minister for Racing	Jim Randell
Minister for Corrective Services (until 19 January 1989); Minister for Police and Emergency Services (from 19 January 1989); Minister for Administrative Services	Russell Cooper
Minister for Health	Leisha Harvey, BA, Dip.Teach. (until 19 January 1989)
Minister for Education, Youth and Sport	Brian Littleproud
Minister for Family Services	Craig Sherrin, BSc, Dip.Ed., MEdSt (from 19 January 1989)

Preceded by Bjelke-Petersen Ministry	Ahern Ministry; 1987–1989	Succeeded by Cooper Ministry
