= Steve Wettenhall =

Australian politician

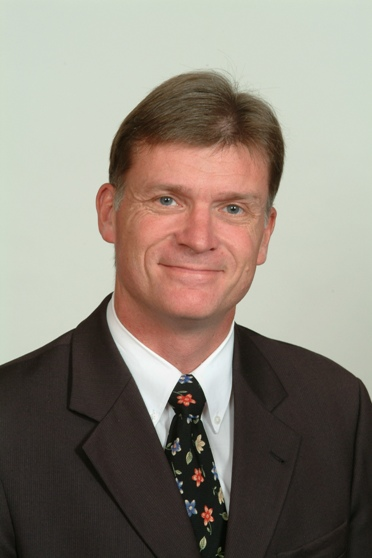

Member of the Parliament of Queensland for Barron River
- In office 9 September 2006 – 24 March 2012
- Preceded by: Lesley Clark
- Succeeded by: Michael Trout

Personal details
- Party: Labor

Stephen Peter Arthur Wettenhall (born 15 February 1963) was the Labor Member of the Parliament of Queensland for Barron River. He was first elected in the 2006 Queensland state election, and was defeated in the 2012 state election.

== Politics ==
Born in Melbourne, he obtained his Bachelor of Arts and Laws at Monash University where he was politically active on campus and was elected by the student body as Chair of the Monash Association of Students. He established his own legal firm in Cairns in 1993. For the next 13 years he specialised in criminal defence advocacy. His firm expanded and accepted instructions in a wide variety of matters including criminal injuries compensation and discrimination and employment cases. He also continued to represent indigenous clients in Cape York and was retained periodically by Aboriginal legal services in the Torres Strait, Gulf of Carpentaria, Mount Isa and Cairns to represent their clients. He takes a very strong and active interest in environment and conservation issues and has served two terms as President of the Cairns and Far North Environment Centre. He is also a founding and honorary life member of the Cairns Community Legal Centre. After the 2009 state election, Wettenhall was appointed Parliamentary Secretary for Tourism and in February 2011, he was appointed Parliamentary Secretary assisting the Premier for Economic Development in the Far North

== State committee service ==
Wettenhall was a member of the panel of temporary Speakers, the Legal, Constitutional and Administrative Review Committee, the Parliamentary Crime and Misconduct Committee and the Investigation into Altruistic Surrogacy Select Committee. He also sat on various Parliamentary Caucus Committees.

He was also a member of the Regional Queensland Council reporting to the Minister for Communities. In this role he was an ex officio member of the FNQ Regional Disability Council, a ministerial advisory body. He also chaired the FNQ Ministerial Regional Community Forums.

== Current ==
Wettenhall has returned to legal practice in Cairns under his own name and is also a nationally accredited and Queensland Law Society approved mediator trading as Cairns Mediation.

Parliament of Queensland
Preceded by Lesley Clark	Member for Barron River; 2006–2012	Succeeded by Michael Trout
