= Second Cooper ministry =

Government of Queensland, Australia

The Cooper Ministry^{[1]} was a ministry of the Government of Queensland and was led by National Party Premier Russell Cooper and Deputy Premier Bill Gunn. It succeeded the Ahern Ministry on 25 September 1989 following a party-room ballot, and was in turn succeeded by the Goss Ministry on 7 December 1989 following the National government's defeat at the 1989 state election by the Labor Party, led by Wayne Goss. Seven of the outgoing ministry lost their seats at the election.

On 25 September 1989, the Governor designated 18 principal executive offices of the Government and appointed the following Members of the Legislative Assembly of Queensland to the Ministry as follows. As the National Party was not in coalition at the time, all listed members are from that party.

Office	Minister
Premier; Treasurer; Minister for State Development	Russell Cooper
Deputy Premier; Minister for Finance; Minister for Local Government	Bill Gunn
Minister for Health	Ivan Gibbs
Minister for Police; Minister for Employment, Training and Industrial Affairs	Vince Lester
Minister for Land Management	Neville Harper
Minister for Mines and Energy; Minister for Northern and Regional Development	Bob Katter
Minister for Water Resources; Minister for Maritime Services	Don Neal
Attorney-General; Minister for Heritage and the Arts	Paul Clauson
Minister for Tourism; Minister for Environment, Conservation and Forestry	Rob Borbidge
Minister for Works; Minister for Housing	Jim Randell
Minister for Education; Minister for Youth; Minister for Sport and Recreation	Brian Littleproud
Minister for Community Services; Minister for Emergency Services; Minister for Administrative Services	Tony Fitzgerald
Minister for Industry, Small Business and Technology	Huan Fraser
Minister for Transport; Minister for Ethnic Affairs	Yvonne Chapman
Minister for Main Roads; Minister for Electricity Minister for Cultural Affairs	Alan Fletcher
Minister for Primary Industries	Mark Stoneman
Minister for Main Roads; Minister for Racing	Gilbert Alison
Minister for Justice; Minister for Corrective Services	Ian Henderson
Minister for Family Services	Beryce Nelson

^{1} An earlier Cooper Ministry was headed by Labor Premier Frank Cooper from 1942 until 1946. Both ministries were officially styled "The Cooper Ministry".

Preceded by Ahern Ministry	Cooper Ministry; 1989 (Sep–Dec)	Succeeded by Goss Ministry
