= Bligh ministry =

Ministry of the Government of Queensland (2007–2012)

Anna Bligh was sworn in as Premier of Queensland on 13 September 2007 with her first ministry, replacing Peter Beattie, who had retired from politics, and his ministry. She subsequently won the 2009 state election with a reduced majority against the newly merged Liberal National Party of Queensland. Shortly thereafter, on 26 March 2009, Bligh reshuffled the ministry. She conducted a second reshuffle on 21 February 2011. Following her party's loss at the 2012 state election, she soon resigned as Premier to make way for the Newman Ministry.

== Initial ministry ==
The first Bligh ministry was sworn in on 13 September 2007.

Portfolio	Minister
Premier	Anna Bligh
Deputy Premier; Minister for Infrastructure and Planning	Paul Lucas
Minister for Public Works, Housing, Information and Communication Technology; Leader of the House	Robert Schwarten
Minister for Police, Corrective Services; Minister for Sport	Judy Spence
Treasurer	Andrew Fraser
Minister for Education and Training; Minister for Arts	Rod Welford
Minister for Health	Stephen Robertson
Minister for Transport, Trade, Employment and Industrial Relations	John Mickel
Minister for Main Roads and Local Government	Warren Pitt
Minister for Child Safety and Women	Margaret Keech
Minister for Tourism, Regional Development and Industry	Desley Boyle
Minister for Primary Industries and Fisheries	Tim Mulherin
Minister for Mines and Energy	Geoff Wilson
Minister for Natural Resources, and Water; Minister Assisting the Premier in North Queensland	Craig Wallace
Minister for Communities, Disability Services, Aboriginal and Torres Strait Island Partnerships, Multicultural Affairs, Seniors and Youth	Lindy Nelson-Carr
Attorney-General; Minister for Justice; Minister Assisting the Premier in Western Queensland	Kerry Shine
Minister for Emergency Services	Neil Roberts
Minister for Sustainability, Climate Change and Innovation	Andrew McNamara
Parliamentary Secretaries
Parliamentary Secretary to the Premier; Parliamentary Secretary for Veterans Affairs (from 25 April 2008)	Phil Reeves
Parliamentary Secretary to the Treasurer	Julie Attwood
Parliamentary Secretary for Education Training and the Arts	Bonny Barry
Parliamentary Secretary for Sport	Chris Bombolas
Parliamentary Secretary for Transport, Trade, Employment and Industrial Relations and for Multicultural Affairs	Michael Choi
Parliamentary Secretary for Transport, Trade, Employment and Industrial Relations	Gary Fenlon
Parliamentary Secretary for Infrastructure and Planning	Stirling Hinchliffe
Parliamentary Secretary for Tourism, Regional Development and Industry	Jan Jarratt
Parliamentary Secretary for Main Roads and Local Government (to 25 April 2008)	Ronan Lee
Parliamentary Secretary to the Attorney-General (25 April – 5 October 2008)	Ronan Lee
Parliamentary Secretary for Communities, Disability Services, Aboriginal and Torres Strait Island Partnerships, Seniors, Youth and Multicultural Affairs	Rachel Nolan
Parliamentary Secretary for Health	Karen Struthers
Parliamentary Secretary for Main Roads and Local Government (from 9 October 2008)	Annastacia Palaszczuk
Whips
Government Whip	Carolyn Male
Deputy Government Whip	Simon Finn
Deputy Government Whip	Kate Jones

Changes

- On 25 April 2008, Bligh reassigned two parliamentary secretaries. Ronan Lee moved from assisting the Minister for Main Roads and Local Government to working for the Attorney-General, Minister for Justice and Minister assisting the Premier in Western Queensland. Specifically, he was to assist on the Fair Trade portfolio, dealing with payday loans and the like. Phil Reeves, the Parliamentary Secretary to the Premier, took on the additional responsibility of Parliamentary Secretary for Veterans.
- Ronan Lee defected to the Greens on 5 October 2008; Annastacia Palaszczuk was appointed to his former post of Parliamentary Secretary for Main Roads and Local Government on 9 October 2008.

== March 2009 reshuffle ==
On 26 March 2009, following the 2009 election, Bligh's reshuffled ministry was sworn in.

Portfolio	Minister
Premier; Minister for Arts	Anna Bligh
Deputy Premier; Minister for Health	Paul Lucas
Treasurer; Minister for Employment and Economic Development	Andrew Fraser
Minister for Public Works and Information and Communication Technology	Robert Schwarten
Minister for Natural Resources, Mines and Energy; Minister for Trade	Stephen Robertson
Minister for Education and Training	Geoff Wilson
Minister for Police, Corrective Services and Emergency Services	Neil Roberts
Minister for Main Roads	Craig Wallace
Minister for Primary Industries, Fisheries and Rural and Regional Queensland	Tim Mulherin
Minister for Local Government and Aboriginal and Torres Strait Islander Partnerships	Desley Boyle
Minister for Infrastructure and Planning	Stirling Hinchliffe
Minister for Transport	Rachel Nolan
Minister for Tourism and Fair Trading	Peter Lawlor
Minister for Child Safety; Minister for Sport	Phil Reeves
Minister for Community Services and Housing; Minister for Women	Karen Struthers
Minister for Disability Services and Multicultural Affairs	Annastacia Palaszczuk
Minister for Climate Change and Sustainability	Kate Jones
Attorney-General; Minister for Industrial Relations	Cameron Dick
Parliamentary Secretaries
Parliamentary Secretary to the Premier; Leader of the House	Judy Spence
Parliamentary Secretary for Health	Murray Watt
Parliamentary Secretary for Employment	Jan Jarratt
Parliamentary Secretary for Natural Resources, Water and Energy and Trade	Michael Choi
Parliamentary Secretary for Disability Services and Multicultural Affairs	Julie Attwood
Parliamentary Secretary for Education	Carolyn Male
Parliamentary Secretary for Emergency Services	Peta-Kaye Croft
Parliamentary Secretary for Industrial Relations	Simon Finn
Parliamentary Secretary for Tourism	Steve Wettenhall
Whips
Government Whip	Margaret Keech
Deputy Government Whip	Vicky Darling
Deputy Government Whip	Betty Kiernan

== February 2011 reshuffle ==
Bligh again reshuffled the ministry on 21 February 2011.

Portfolio	Minister
Premier; Minister for Reconstruction	Anna Bligh
Deputy Premier (until 16 September 2011); Attorney-General; Minister for Local Government; Special Minister of State	Paul Lucas
Deputy Premier (from 16 September 2011); Treasurer; Minister for State Development and Trade	Andrew Fraser
Minister for Health	Geoff Wilson
Minister for Police, Corrective Services and Emergency Services	Neil Roberts
Minister for Energy and Water Utilities	Stephen Robertson
Minister for Main Roads, Fisheries and Marine Infrastructure	Craig Wallace
Minister for Education and Industrial Relations	Cameron Dick
Minister for Agriculture, Food and Regional Economies	Tim Mulherin
Minister for Employment, Skills and Mining	Stirling Hinchliffe
Minister for Finance and The Arts (until 22 June 2011)	Rachel Nolan
Minister for Finance, Natural Resources and The Arts (from 22 June 2011)	Rachel Nolan
Minister for Environment and Resource Management (until 22 June 2011)	Kate Jones
Minister for Transport and Multicultural Affairs	Annastacia Palaszczuk
Minister for Child Safety; Minister for Sport	Phil Reeves
Minister for Community Services and Housing; Minister for Women	Karen Struthers
Minister for Tourism, Manufacturing and Small Business	Jan Jarratt
Minister for Government Services, Building Industry and Information and Communication Technology	Simon Finn
Minister for Disabilities, Mental Health and Aboriginal and Torres Strait Islander Partnerships	Curtis Pitt
Minister for the Environment (from 22 June 2011)	Vicky Darling
Parliamentary Secretaries
Parliamentary Secretary for Parliamentary Reform; Leader of the House	Judy Spence
Parliamentary Secretary for Trade and Multicultural Affairs	Michael Choi
Parliamentary Secretary to the Treasurer	Murray Watt
Parliamentary Secretary for Health	Julie Attwood
Parliamentary Secretary assisting the Premier on the Gold Coast and Commonwealth Games	Peta-Kaye Croft
Parliamentary Secretary for Emergency Services	Betty Kiernan
Parliamentary Secretary assisting the Premier and for Economic Development in the Far North	Steve Wettenhall
Whips
Government Whip	Margaret Keech
Deputy Government Whip	Vicky Darling (until 22 June 2011)
Deputy Government Whip	Grace Grace (from 22 June 2011)
Deputy Government Whip	Carolyn Male

Changes

- On 22 June 2011, Kate Jones resigned to concentrate on her re-election contest in Ashgrove, fighting against Liberal National Party Leader Campbell Newman. Vicky Darling took over the Environment part of her portfolio and was in turn replaced as a Deputy Government Whip by Grace Grace. The Natural Resources portion of the brief was given to Rachel Nolan, making her Minister for Finance, Natural Resources and The Arts.
- Paul Lucas resigned as Deputy Premier (retaining his other portfolios), having announced the previous day he would stand down from politics at the next election. Andrew Fraser replaced him.

Preceded by Beattie Ministry	Bligh Ministry; 2007–2012	Succeeded by Newman Ministry
