= Craig Crawford (politician) =

Australian politician

The Honourable Craig Crawford MP
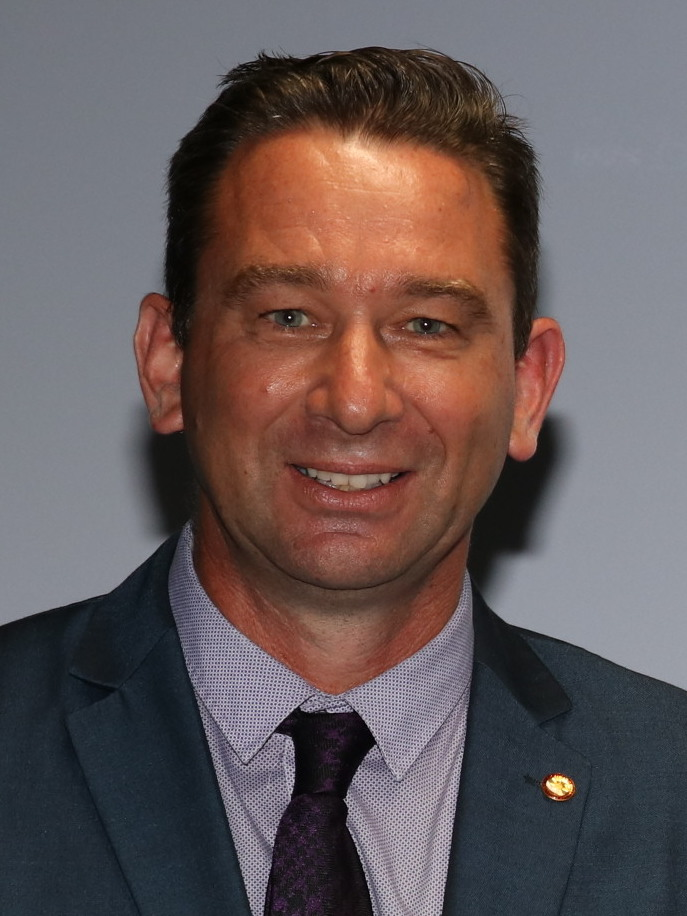
- Crawford in 2017

Minister for Seniors and Disability Services
- In office 12 November 2020 – 18 December 2023
- Premier: Annastacia Palaszczuk; Steven Miles
- Preceded by: Coralee O'Rourke
- Succeeded by: Charis Mullen

Minister for Aboriginal and Torres Strait Islander Partnerships
- In office 11 May 2020 – 18 May 2023
- Premier: Annastacia Palaszczuk
- Preceded by: Jackie Trad
- Succeeded by: Leeanne Enoch

Minister for Fire and Emergency Services
- In office 12 December 2017 – 12 November 2020
- Premier: Annastacia Palaszczuk
- Preceded by: Mark Ryan
- Succeeded by: Mark Ryan

Member of the Queensland Legislative Assembly for Barron River
- In office 31 January 2015 – 26 October 2024
- Preceded by: Michael Trout
- Succeeded by: Bree James

Personal details
- Born: 17 January 1970 (age 56) Terang, Victoria, Australia
- Party: Labor
- Spouse: Rosalie Crawford
- Children: 1
- Occupation: Paramedic; Hotel manager
- Website: www.craigcrawford.com.au

Craig Daryl Crawford (born 17 January 1970) is an Australian politician. He was the Labor member for the Far North Queensland seat of Barron River in the Queensland Legislative Assembly from 2015 to 2024.

== Career ==
Crawford began his professional career working in hotel management. During his 20 years of voluntary service to the Victorian Country Fire Authority, he was promoted to the rank of captain and selected to be an ambulance paramedic. He went on to work for both Ambulance Victoria and the Queensland Ambulance Service respectively for over 15 years. He has a Diploma of Ambulance Paramedic Studies and a Certificate IV in Fire Technology.

Prior to his promotion to the Second Palaszczuk Ministry, Crawford served as a member of Queensland Parliament's Ethics Committee from February 2016 to November 2017, and also as a member of the Infrastructure, Planning and Natural Resources Committee from May 2016 to November 2017.

== Personal life ==
Crawford married his wife Rosalie at Queensland Parliament House in Brisbane in April 2016.

== See also ==
- Second Palaszczuk Ministry
- Third Palaszczuk Ministry

Parliament of Queensland
Preceded by Michael Trout	Member for Barron River; 2015–2024	Succeeded by Bree James
Political offices
Preceded by Coralee O'Rourke	Minister for Seniors and Disability Services; 2020–2023	Succeeded by Charis Mullen
Preceded by Jackie Trad	Minister for Aboriginal and Torres Strait Islander Partnerships; 2020–2023	Succeeded by Leeanne Enoch
Preceded by Mark Ryan	Minister for Fire and Emergency Services; 2017–2020	Succeeded by Mark Ryan
