= Martin Tenni =

Australian politician (1934–2019)

The Honourable Martin Tenni OAM

Member of the Queensland Legislative Assembly for Barron River
- In office 7 December 1974 – 10 November 1989
- Preceded by: Bill Wood
- Succeeded by: Lesley Clark

Personal details
- Born: Martin James Tenni; 4 April 1934 Cairns, Queensland, Australia
- Died: 20 October 2019 (aged 85) Cairns
- Party: National Party
- Spouse: Marion Dawn Hickling (m.1956)
- Occupation: Hardware store proprietor

Martin James Tenni (4 April 1934 – 20 October 2019) was an Australian politician. He was a Member of the Queensland Legislative Assembly.

== Early life ==
Martin Tenni was born on 4 April 1934 in Cairns, the son of Henry Tenni and Francis May, née Reed. After attending state schools in the Cairns area, he underwent national service training in 1952 before entering the hardware business, eventually managing his own company.

== Politics ==
A member of the National Party, Tenni was a member of the Mareeba Shire Council from 1970 to 1976 (chairman from 1973 to 1976).

In 1974, he was elected to the Queensland Legislative Assembly as the member for Barron River. In 1983 he was promoted to the front bench as Minister for Environment, Valuation and Administrative Services. He was moved to Water Resources and Maritime Services in 1986 and to Mines and Energy in 1987, adding Northern Development in 1989. He resigned from parliament on 10 November 1989.

Parliament of Queensland
Preceded by Bill Wood	Member for Barron River; 1974–1989	Succeeded by Lesley Clark
