= John Row (Australian politician) =

Australian politician

The Honourable Sir John Row KBE, JP

Member of the Queensland Legislative Assembly for Hinchinbrook
- In office 28 May 1960 – 27 May 1972
- Preceded by: Cecil Jesson
- Succeeded by: Ted Row

Personal details
- Born: John Alfred Row; 1 January 1905 Ingham, Queensland, Australia
- Died: 15 May 1993 (aged 88) Ingham, Queensland, Australia
- Party: Country Party
- Spouse(s): Gladys Mary Hollins (m.1929 d.1952), Irene Gough (m.1966)
- Relations: Ted Row (nephew)
- Occupation: Cane farmer

Sir John Alfred Row KBE (1 January 1905 – 15 May 1993) was a member of the Queensland Legislative Assembly.

== Biography ==
Row was born at Ingham, Queensland, the son of Charles Edward Row and his wife Emily Harriett (née Weller). He was educated at Trebonne State School, before heading to Toowoomba where he attended Toowoomba East State School and then the Toowoomba Grammar School. After leaving school he purchased a cane farm at Trebonne in 1924 and worked it until 1960.

On 19 November 1929 he married Gladys Mary Hollins and together had a daughter. Gladys died in 1952 and Row then married Irene Gough on 31 July 1966. He died at Ingham in May 1993.

== Public career ==
Row started in politics as a councillor on the Hinchinbrook Shire Council from 1952 until 1963. He first attempted to enter state politics at the 1957 Queensland state election in the seat of Hinchinbrook but was beaten by the Labor candidate and sitting member, Cecil Jesson.

Three years later, and with Jesson retiring, Row stood again for Hinchinbrook and this time he was successful. Row went on to represent the people of Hinchinbrook until the 1972 state election.

Row was in the ministry for most of his state political career. He held the roles of: Minister for Agriculture and Forestry 1963 Minister for Primary Industries 1963–1972

Row was awarded the Knight Bachelor in 1974 for services to Queensland. When he retired in 1972, his nephew, Ted Row, took over as the member for Hinchinbrook.

Parliament of Queensland
Preceded by Cecil Jesson	Member for Hinchinbrook; 1960–1972	Succeeded by Ted Row
