= Electoral results for the district of Mackay =

Queensland, Australia, district election results

This is a list of electoral results for the electoral district of Mackay in Queensland state elections.

== Members for Mackay ==
First incarnation (1878–1888, 1 member)
Member	Party	Term
Francis Amhurst	Unaligned	1878–1881
Maurice Hume Black	Unaligned	1881–1888
Second incarnation (1888–1912, 2 members)
Member	Party	Term
Maurice Hume Black	Unaligned	1888–1893
David Dalrymple	Ministerialist	1888–1904
James Chataway	Ministerialist	1893–1901
Walter Paget	Ministerialist/Opposition	1901–1912
Albert Fudge	Labor	1904–1907
Edward Swayne	Opposition	1907–1912
Third incarnation (1912–present, 1 member)
Member	Party	Term
Walter Paget	Ministerialist/Opposition	1912–1915
William Forgan Smith	Labor	1915–1942
Fred Graham	Labor	1943–1969
Ed Casey	Labor	1969–1972
Ed Casey	Independent	1972–1977
Ed Casey	Labor	1977–1995
Tim Mulherin	Labor	1995–2015
Julieanne Gilbert	Labor	2015–2024
Nigel Dalton	Liberal National	2024–present

== Election results ==
=== Elections in the 2020s ===
2024 Queensland state election: Mackay
Party	Candidate	Votes	%	±%
Liberal National	Nigel Dalton	15,155	45.99	+14.04
Labor	Belinda Hassan	9,985	30.30	−16.17
One Nation	Kylee Stanton	3,864	11.73	−0.86
Greens	Paula Creen	1,635	4.96	+1.56
Legalise Cannabis	Ben Gauci	1,625	4.93	+0.55
Family First	Norman Martin	689	2.09	+2.09
Total formal votes		32,953	95.50	−0.49
Informal votes		1,551	4.50	+0.49
Turnout		34,504	85.41	−0.46
Two-party-preferred result
Liberal National	Nigel Dalton	19,839	60.20	+16.92
Labor	Belinda Hassan	13,114	39.80	−16.92
Liberal National gain from Labor		Swing	+16.92	

2020 Queensland state election: Mackay
Party	Candidate	Votes	%	±%
Labor	Julieanne Gilbert	14,632	46.47	+3.55
Liberal National	Chris Bonanno	10,061	31.95	+7.21
One Nation	Christine Keys	3,965	12.59	−10.06
Legalise Cannabis	Shaun Krstic	1,378	4.38	+4.38
Greens	Imogen Lindenberg	1,071	3.40	−1.58
Informed Medical Options	Julie Saunders	382	1.21	+1.21
Total formal votes		31,489	95.99	+0.46
Informal votes		1,314	4.01	−0.46
Turnout		32,803	85.87	−1.07
Two-party-preferred result
Labor	Julieanne Gilbert	17,862	56.72	−1.61
Liberal National	Chris Bonanno	13,627	43.28	+1.61
Labor hold		Swing	−1.61	

=== Elections in the 2010s ===
2017 Queensland state election: Mackay
Party	Candidate	Votes	%	±%
Labor	Julieanne Gilbert	13,281	42.9	−0.2
Liberal National	Nicole Batzloff	7,657	24.7	−4.0
One Nation	Jeff Keioskie	7,009	22.6	+22.6
Greens	Elliot Jennings	1,542	5.0	+0.2
Independent	Martin McCann	1,459	4.7	+4.7
Total formal votes		30,948	95.5	−2.1
Informal votes		1,445	4.5	+2.1
Turnout		32,393	86.9	−2.6
Two-party-preferred result
Labor	Julieanne Gilbert	18,054	58.3	−1.9
Liberal National	Nicole Batzloff	12,894	41.7	+1.9
Labor hold		Swing	−1.9	

2015 Queensland state election: Mackay
Party	Candidate	Votes	%	±%
Labor	Julieanne Gilbert	11,346	43.83	+5.25
Liberal National	Deon Attard	6,680	25.80	−11.14
Independent	Julie Boyd	5,720	22.10	+22.10
Greens	Jonathon Dykyj	1,285	4.96	−0.58
Family First	Lindsay Temple	857	3.31	+3.31
Total formal votes		25,888	97.54	−0.26
Informal votes		653	2.46	+0.26
Turnout		26,541	89.44	−0.31
Two-party-preferred result
Labor	Julieanne Gilbert	13,542	62.39	+11.86
Liberal National	Deon Attard	8,162	37.61	−11.86
Labor hold		Swing	+11.86	

2012 Queensland state election: Mackay
Party	Candidate	Votes	%	±%
Labor	Tim Mulherin	9,920	38.58	−22.78
Liberal National	John Kerslake	9,499	36.94	+6.76
Katter's Australian	Lindsay Temple	4,870	18.94	+18.94
Greens	Luke Mathews	1,425	5.54	−2.92
Total formal votes		25,714	97.80	+0.07
Informal votes		578	2.20	−0.07
Turnout		26,292	89.75	−1.07
Two-party-preferred result
Labor	Tim Mulherin	11,317	50.53	−16.19
Liberal National	John Kerslake	11,081	49.47	+16.19
Labor hold		Swing	−16.19	

=== Elections in the 2000s ===
2009 Queensland state election: Mackay
Party	Candidate	Votes	%	±%
Labor	Tim Mulherin	16,273	61.4	−0.2
Liberal National	Bob Oakes	8,003	30.2	+1.4
Greens	Jonathon Dykyj	2,244	8.5	+2.4
Total formal votes		26,520	97.5	
Informal votes		617	2.5	
Turnout		27,137	90.8	
Two-party-preferred result
Labor	Tim Mulherin	16,892	66.7	−0.5
Liberal National	Bob Oakes	8,426	33.3	+0.5
Labor hold		Swing	−0.5	

2006 Queensland state election: Mackay
Party	Candidate	Votes	%	±%
Labor	Tim Mulherin	15,208	61.9	+6.0
National	Craig Joy	6,990	28.4	+1.7
Greens	Michele Graham	1,532	6.2	−1.0
Independent	Archie Julien	850	3.5	+3.5
Total formal votes		24,580	97.3	−0.7
Informal votes		677	2.7	+0.7
Turnout		25,257	90.2	−1.1
Two-party-preferred result
Labor	Tim Mulherin	15,707	67.6	+1.8
National	Craig Joy	7,520	32.4	−1.8
Labor hold		Swing	+1.8	

2004 Queensland state election: Mackay
Party	Candidate	Votes	%	±%
Labor	Tim Mulherin	13,824	55.9	−2.8
National	Craig Joy	6,603	26.7	−4.6
One Nation	John Bonaventura	2,511	10.2	+10.2
Greens	Jen Hayward	1,780	7.2	+7.2
Total formal votes		24,718	98.0	+0.3
Informal votes		509	2.0	−0.3
Turnout		25,227	91.3	−0.5
Two-party-preferred result
Labor	Tim Mulherin	14,816	65.8	+2.3
National	Craig Joy	7,703	34.2	−2.3
Labor hold		Swing	+2.3	

2001 Queensland state election: Mackay
Party	Candidate	Votes	%	±%
Labor	Tim Mulherin	14,235	58.7	+10.7
National	Martin Bella	7,594	31.3	+8.0
City Country Alliance	Barry Townsend	2,433	10.0	+10.0
Total formal votes		24,262	97.7	
Informal votes		580	2.3	
Turnout		24,842	91.8	
Two-party-preferred result
Labor	Tim Mulherin	14,494	63.5	+4.3
National	Martin Bella	8,323	36.5	−4.3
Labor hold		Swing	+4.3	

=== Elections in the 1990s ===
1998 Queensland state election: Mackay
Party	Candidate	Votes	%	±%
Labor	Tim Mulherin	9,603	48.7	−3.8
One Nation	Barry Evans	5,323	27.0	+27.0
National	Marcella Massie	4,503	22.9	−16.1
Independent	Mike Ettridge	272	1.4	+1.4
Total formal votes		19,701	98.6	+0.6
Informal votes		279	1.4	−0.6
Turnout		19,980	93.3	+3.3
Two-candidate-preferred result
Labor	Tim Mulherin	10,536	56.5	+0.9
One Nation	Barry Evans	8,103	43.5	+43.5
Labor hold		Swing	+0.9	

1995 Queensland state election: Mackay
Party	Candidate	Votes	%	±%
Labor	Tim Mulherin	10,144	52.5	−2.5
National	Bruce Avenell	7,536	39.0	+15.7
Confederate Action	Peter Barbour	1,641	8.5	−5.3
Total formal votes		19,321	98.0	−0.1
Informal votes		403	2.0	+0.1
Turnout		19,724	90.0	
Two-party-preferred result
Labor	Tim Mulherin	10,587	55.7	−8.5
National	Bruce Avenell	8,433	44.3	+8.5
Labor hold		Swing	−8.5	

1992 Queensland state election: Mackay
Party	Candidate	Votes	%	±%
Labor	Ed Casey	11,276	55.0	−2.0
National	Eric Ross	4,778	23.3	−4.6
Confederate Action	Sandra Hill	2,831	13.8	+13.8
Liberal	David Hamilton	1,617	7.9	−3.4
Total formal votes		20,502	98.0	
Informal votes		410	2.0	
Turnout		20,912	90.1	
Two-party-preferred result
Labor	Ed Casey	12,194	64.2	+3.9
National	Eric Ross	6,799	35.8	−3.9
Labor hold		Swing	+3.9	

=== Elections in the 1980s ===
1989 Queensland state election: Mackay
Party	Candidate	Votes	%	±%
Labor	Ed Casey	9,566	58.0	+6.5
National	Greg Williamson	4,717	28.6	−12.3
Liberal	Gary Kennedy	1,688	10.2	+2.6
Independent	Trevor Dempster	531	3.2	+3.2
Total formal votes		16,502	97.1	−1.5
Informal votes		489	2.9	+1.5
Turnout		16,991	90.5	−0.4
Two-party-preferred result
Labor	Ed Casey	10,050	60.9	+7.3
National	Greg Williamson	6,452	39.1	−7.3
Labor hold		Swing	+7.3	

1986 Queensland state election: Mackay
Party	Candidate	Votes	%	±%
Labor	Ed Casey	7,830	51.5	−4.5
National	Greg Williamson	6,211	40.9	−3.1
Liberal	Charles Camilleri	1,162	7.6	+7.6
Total formal votes		15,203	98.6	+0.2
Informal votes		210	1.4	−0.2
Turnout		15,413	90.9	+0.1
Two-party-preferred result
Labor	Ed Casey	8,149	53.6	−1.5
National	Greg Williamson	7,054	46.4	+1.5
Labor hold		Swing	−1.5	

1983 Queensland state election: Mackay
Party	Candidate	Votes	%	±%
Labor	Ed Casey	10,372	56.0	−3.2
National	John Comerford	8,163	44.0	+12.0
Total formal votes		18,535	98.4	−0.5
Informal votes		295	1.6	+0.5
Turnout		18,830	90.8	+2.5
Labor hold		Swing	−5.6	

1980 Queensland state election: Mackay
Party	Candidate	Votes	%	±%
Labor	Ed Casey	10,106	59.2	+2.1
National	Lionel Bevis	5,457	32.0	+9.2
Liberal	Kevin Dray	1,500	8.8	−3.7
Total formal votes		17,063	98.9	+0.5
Informal votes		190	1.1	−0.5
Turnout		17,253	88.3	−3.9
Two-party-preferred result
Labor	Ed Casey	10,518	61.6	−0.3
National	Lionel Bevis	6,545	38.4	+0.3
Labor hold		Swing	−0.3	

=== Elections in the 1970s ===
1977 Queensland state election: Mackay
Party	Candidate	Votes	%	±%
Labor	Ed Casey	9,438	57.1	+41.6
National	Fitzroy McLean	3,766	22.8	−4.4
Liberal	Jeanette Bevan	2,071	12.5	+12.5
Independent	Sebastian Torrisi	1,257	7.6	+7.6
Total formal votes		16,532	98.4	
Informal votes		262	1.6	
Turnout		16,794	92.2	
Two-party-preferred result
Labor	Ed Casey	10,231	61.9	+61.9
National	Fitzroy McLean	6,301	38.1	+0.6
Labor gain from Independent		Swing	N/A	

1974 Queensland state election: Mackay
Party	Candidate	Votes	%	±%
Independent	Ed Casey	9,016	57.3	+21.1
National	Lionel Bevis	4,282	27.2	+1.5
Labor	John Hill	2,437	15.5	−12.3
Total formal votes		15,735	98.7	0.0
Informal votes		199	1.3	0.0
Turnout		15,934	89.5	−3.1
Two-candidate-preferred result
Independent	Ed Casey	11,087	70.5	+7.1
National	Lionel Bevis	4,648	29.5	−7.1
Independent hold		Swing	+0.8	

1972 Queensland state election: Mackay
Party	Candidate	Votes	%	±%
Independent	Ed Casey	5,239	36.2	+36.2
Labor	John Breen	4,027	27.8	−30.9
Country	Charles Johnstone	3,717	25.7	+25.7
Liberal	Robert Gray	1,480	10.2	−27.5
Total formal votes		14,463	98.7	
Informal votes		190	1.3	
Turnout		14,653	92.6	
Two-candidate-preferred result
Independent	Ed Casey	9,167	63.4	+63.4
Labor	John Breen	5,296	36.6	−20.1
Independent gain from Labor		Swing	+63.4	

=== Elections in the 1960s ===
1969 Queensland state election: Mackay
Party	Candidate	Votes	%	±%
Labor	Ed Casey	5,501	58.7	−0.6
Liberal	Robert Gray	3,535	37.7	+37.7
Independent	Thomas McCanna	331	3.5	+3.5
Total formal votes		9,367	98.4	−0.2
Informal votes		154	1.6	+0.2
Turnout		9,521	90.4	−2.2
Two-party-preferred result
Labor	Ed Casey	5,667	60.5	−0.6
Liberal	Robert Gray	3,700	39.5	+39.5
Labor hold		Swing	−0.6	

1966 Queensland state election: Mackay
Party	Candidate	Votes	%	±%
Labor	Fred Graham	5,604	59.3	+5.8
Country	Roylance Eastment	2,932	31.0	−6.1
Queensland Labor	T.J. Hayes	918	9.7	+0.3
Total formal votes		9,454	98.6	+0.2
Informal votes		137	1.4	−0.2
Turnout		9,591	92.6	−2.3
Two-party-preferred result
Labor	Fred Graham	5,775	61.1	+5.9
Country	Roylance Eastment	3,679	38.9	−5.9
Labor hold		Swing	+5.9	

1963 Queensland state election: Mackay
Party	Candidate	Votes	%	±%
Labor	Fred Graham	4,963	53.5	+3.3
Country	John Matson	3,449	37.1	−1.7
Queensland Labor	Edwin Relf	873	9.4	−1.6
Total formal votes		9,285	98.4	−0.6
Informal votes		152	1.6	+0.6
Turnout		9,437	94.9	+1.9
Two-party-preferred result
Labor	Fred Graham	5,125	55.2	
Country	John Matson	4,160	44.8	
Labor hold		Swing	N/A	

1960 Queensland state election: Mackay
Party	Candidate	Votes	%	±%
Labor	Fred Graham	4,561	50.2	
Country	John Matson	3,526	38.8	
Queensland Labor	Terence Hayes	1,004	11.0	
Total formal votes		9,091	99.0	
Informal votes		95	1.0	
Turnout		9,186	93.0	
Labor hold		Swing		

=== Elections in the 1950s ===
1957 Queensland state election: Mackay
Party	Candidate	Votes	%	±%
Labor	Fred Graham	3,175	42.0	−16.0
Liberal	William Field	2,939	38.8	−0.7
Queensland Labor	Joseph Griffin	1,452	19.2	+19.2
Total formal votes		7,566	98.9	0.0
Informal votes		84	1.1	0.0
Turnout		7,650	95.2	+2.1
Labor hold		Swing	−7.9	

1956 Queensland state election: Mackay
Party	Candidate	Votes	%	±%
Labor	Fred Graham	4,344	58.0	−6.5
Liberal	David Treacy	2,924	39.0	+3.5
Independent	James Rowen	223	3.0	+3.0
Total formal votes		7,491	98.9	−0.4
Informal votes		81	1.1	+0.4
Turnout		7,572	93.1	−2.8
Labor hold		Swing	−5.0	

1953 Queensland state election: Mackay
Party	Candidate	Votes	%	±%
Labor	Fred Graham	4,586	64.5	+9.5
Liberal	Flora Johnson	2,520	35.5	−9.5
Total formal votes		7,106	99.3	+0.1
Informal votes		48	0.7	−0.1
Turnout		7,154	95.9	+3.8
Labor hold		Swing	+9.5	

1950 Queensland state election: Mackay
Party	Candidate	Votes	%	±%
Labor	Fred Graham	4,129	55.0	
Liberal	Noel Weder	3,383	45.0	
Total formal votes		7,512	99.2	
Informal votes		58	0.8	
Turnout		7,570	92.1	
Labor hold		Swing		

=== Elections in the 1940s ===
1947 Queensland state election: Mackay
Party	Candidate	Votes	%	±%
Labor	Fred Graham	6,289	60.8	+2.7
Country	Jack Broughton	4,047	39.2	−2.7
Total formal votes		10,336	99.2	+0.3
Informal votes		87	0.8	−0.3
Turnout		10,423	86.7	+4.5
Labor hold		Swing	+2.7	

1944 Queensland state election: Mackay
Party	Candidate	Votes	%	±%
Labor	Fred Graham	5,086	58.1	−9.4
People's Party	Ernie Evans	3,676	41.9	+41.9
Total formal votes		8,762	98.9	+0.7
Informal votes		96	1.1	−0.7
Turnout		8,858	82.2	−6.5
Labor hold		Swing	N/A	

1943 Mackay state by-election
Party	Candidate	Votes	%	±%
Labor	Fred Graham	3,091	38.8	−28.7
Country	Ian Wood	2,464	30.9	+30.9
Independent	John Mulherin	2,085	26.2	−6.3
Independent	Peter Punzell	322	4.0	+4.0
Total formal votes		7,962	99.4	+1.2
Informal votes		44	0.6	−1.2
Turnout		8,006		
Labor hold		Swing	N/A	

1941 Queensland state election: Mackay
Party	Candidate	Votes	%	±%
Labor	William Forgan Smith	6,436	67.5	−13.1
Independent	John Mulherin	3,103	32.5	+32.5
Total formal votes		9,539	98.2	+0.9
Informal votes		170	1.8	−0.9
Turnout		9,709	88.7	−1.0
Labor hold		Swing	N/A	

=== Elections in the 1930s ===
1938 Queensland state election: Mackay
Party	Candidate	Votes	%	±%
Labor	William Forgan Smith	7,153	80.6	+9.0
Social Credit	John Neville	1,717	19.4	+12.2
Total formal votes		8,870	97.3	−1.4
Informal votes		242	2.7	+1.4
Turnout		9,112	89.7	0.0
Labor hold		Swing	N/A	

1935 Queensland state election: Mackay
Party	Candidate	Votes	%	±%
Labor	William Smith	6,144	71.6	
CPNP	William Ferguson	1,826	21.3	
Social Credit	Arthur Williams	614	7.1	
Total formal votes		8,579	98.7	
Informal votes		114	1.3	
Turnout		8,698	89.7	
Labor hold		Swing		

- Preferences were not distributed.

1932 Queensland state election: Mackay
Party	Candidate	Votes	%	±%
Labor	William Forgan Smith	4,535	61.4	
CPNP	Alexander Mackay	2,670	36.1	
Independent	Arthur Williams	183	2.5	
Total formal votes		7,388	98.7	
Informal votes		99	1.3	
Turnout		7,487	88.1	
Labor hold		Swing		

- Preferences were not distributed.

=== Elections in the 1920s ===
1929 Queensland state election: Mackay
Party	Candidate	Votes	%	±%
Labor	William Forgan Smith	3,686	57.9	−6.7
CPNP	George Milton	2,679	42.1	+6.7
Total formal votes		6,365	99.0	0.0
Informal votes		62	1.0	0.0
Turnout		6,427	85.5	+3.4
Labor hold		Swing	−6.7	

1926 Queensland state election: Mackay
Party	Candidate	Votes	%	±%
Labor	William Forgan Smith	3,448	64.6	+6.7
CPNP	Hector O'Brien	1,888	35.4	−6.7
Total formal votes		5,336	99.0	−0.7
Informal votes		52	1.0	+0.7
Turnout		5,388	82.1	+2.4
Labor hold		Swing	+6.7	

1923 Queensland state election: Mackay
Party	Candidate	Votes	%	±%
Labor	William Forgan Smith	2,652	57.9	+4.7
United	Lewis Nott	1,931	42.1	+42.1
Total formal votes		4,583	99.7	+0.8
Informal votes		14	0.3	−0.8
Turnout		4,597	79.7	−0.6
Labor hold		Swing	N/A	

1920 Queensland state election: Mackay
Party	Candidate	Votes	%	±%
Labor	William Forgan Smith	2,630	53.2	−2.8
Northern Country	James McLaren	1,907	38.5	+38.5
Independent Country	Charles Clarke	411	8.3	+8.3
Total formal votes		4,948	98.9	+0.1
Informal votes		57	1.1	−0.1
Turnout		5,005	80.3	+2.5
Labor hold		Swing	N/A	

=== Elections in the 1910s ===
1918 Queensland state election: Mackay
Party	Candidate	Votes	%	±%
Labor	William Forgan Smith	2,606	56.0	+1.6
National	William Manning	2,047	44.0	−1.6
Total formal votes		4,653	98.8	+0.2
Informal votes		54	1.2	−0.2
Turnout		4,707	77.8	−2.6
Labor hold		Swing	+1.6	

1915 Queensland state election: Mackay
Party	Candidate	Votes	%	±%
Labor	William Forgan Smith	2,226	54.4	+16.5
Liberal	George Johnson	1,864	45.6	−16.5
Total formal votes		4,090	98.6	+2.5
Informal votes		60	1.4	−2.5
Turnout		4,150	80.4	+10.9
Labor gain from Liberal		Swing	+16.5	

1912 Queensland state election: Mackay
Party	Candidate	Votes	%	±%
Liberal	Walter Paget	1,937	62.1	
Labor	Charles Tait	1,182	37.9	
Total formal votes		3,119	96.1	
Informal votes		127	3.9	
Turnout		3,246	69.5	
Liberal hold		Swing		
