= Electoral results for the district of Mirani =

Queensland, Australia, district election results

This is a list of electoral results for the electoral district of Mirani in Queensland state elections.

== Members for Mirani ==
Member	Party	Term
Edward Swayne	Opposition/Liberal/ National/Northern Country/Country/Country and Progressive National	1912–1935
Ted Walsh	Labor	1935–1947
Ernie Evans	Country	1947–1965
Tom Newbery	Country	1965–1974
Tom Newbery	National	1974–1980
Jim Randell	National	1980–1994
Ted Malone	National	1994–2008
Ted Malone	Liberal National	2008–2015
Jim Pearce	Labor	2015–2017
Stephen Andrew	One Nation	2017–2024
Stephen Andrew	Independent	2024
Stephen Andrew	Katter's Australian	2024
Glen Kelly	Liberal National	2024–present

== Election results ==
=== Elections in the 2020s ===
2024 Queensland state election: Mirani
Party	Candidate	Votes	%	±%
Liberal National	Glen Kelly	11,750	36.7	+9.1
Katter's Australian	Stephen Andrew	8,017	25.0	+25.0
Labor	Susan Teder	6,521	20.3	−11.6
One Nation	Brett Neal	3,804	11.9	−19.8
Greens	Maria Carty	1,043	3.3	+0.8
Family First	Patricia Martin	911	2.8	+2.8
Total formal votes		32,046	95.7	
Informal votes		1,429	4.3	
Turnout		33,475		
Two-candidate-preferred result
Liberal National	Glen Kelly	16,333	51.0	+9.9
Katter's Australian	Stephen Andrew	15,713	49.0	−9.9
Liberal National gain from Katter's Australian		Swing	+9.9	

2020 Queensland state election: Mirani
Party	Candidate	Votes	%	±%
Labor	Shane Hamilton	9,412	31.97	−4.78
One Nation	Stephen Andrew	9,320	31.66	−0.38
Liberal National	Tracie Newitt	8,123	27.59	+0.69
NQ First	Jason Borg	1,200	4.08	+4.08
Greens	Ben Watkin	715	2.43	−1.90
Civil Liberties & Motorists	Nick Byram	342	1.16	+1.16
United Australia	Tepepe Borg	329	1.12	+1.12
Total formal votes		29,441	96.25	−0.29
Informal votes		1,146	3.75	+0.29
Turnout		30,587	89.59	−1.54
Notional two-party-preferred count (Note: Estimate two-party preferred count by Antony Green.)
Liberal National	Tracie Newitt		53.20	
Labor	Shane Hamilton		46.80	
Two-candidate-preferred result
One Nation	Stephen Andrew	17,363	58.98	+4.16
Labor	Shane Hamilton	12,078	41.02	−4.16
One Nation hold		Swing	+4.16	

=== Elections in the 2010s ===
2017 Queensland state election: Mirani
Party	Candidate	Votes	%	±%
Labor	Jim Pearce	10,592	36.7	−4.3
One Nation	Stephen Andrew	9,234	32.0	+32.0
Liberal National	Kerry Latter	7,753	26.9	−11.4
Greens	Christine Carlisle	1,247	4.3	+0.2
Total formal votes		28,826	96.5	−1.4
Informal votes		1,033	3.5	+1.4
Turnout		29,859	91.1	−0.7
Two-candidate-preferred result
One Nation	Stephen Andrew	15,801	54.8	+54.8
Labor	Jim Pearce	13,025	45.2	−8.6
One Nation gain from Labor		Swing	+8.6	

2015 Queensland state election: Mirani
Party	Candidate	Votes	%	±%
Labor	Jim Pearce	12,919	41.89	+13.19
Liberal National	John Kerslake	11,505	37.31	−9.34
Palmer United	Michael Hall	5,146	16.69	+16.69
Greens	Trisha Brindley	1,268	4.11	+0.77
Total formal votes		30,838	97.99	−0.26
Informal votes		633	2.01	+0.26
Turnout		31,471	92.28	−0.10
Two-party-preferred result
Labor	Jim Pearce	15,206	54.82	+16.01
Liberal National	John Kerslake	12,534	45.18	−16.01
Labor gain from Liberal National		Swing	+16.01	

2012 Queensland state election: Mirani
Party	Candidate	Votes	%	±%
Liberal National	Ted Malone	13,599	46.65	−1.30
Labor	Jim Pearce	8,369	28.71	−17.82
Katter's Australian	Bevan Pidgeon	5,585	19.16	+19.16
Greens	Christine Carlisle	975	3.34	−2.17
Family First	Mike Crouther	626	2.15	+2.15
Total formal votes		29,154	98.25	−0.06
Informal votes		520	1.75	+0.06
Turnout		29,674	92.37	−0.42
Two-party-preferred result
Liberal National	Ted Malone	15,345	61.19	+10.60
Labor	Jim Pearce	9,733	38.81	−10.60
Liberal National hold		Swing	+10.60	

=== Elections in the 2000s ===
2009 Queensland state election: Mirani
Party	Candidate	Votes	%	±%
Liberal National	Ted Malone	13,618	48.0	+2.8
Labor	Scott Murphy	13,215	46.5	−1.5
Greens	Christine Carlisle	1,566	5.5	+5.5
Total formal votes		28,399	98.2	
Informal votes		489	1.8	
Turnout		28,888	92.8	
Two-party-preferred result
Liberal National	Ted Malone	13,965	50.6	+1.8
Labor	Scott Murphy	13,640	49.4	−1.8
Liberal National gain from Labor		Swing	+1.8	

2006 Queensland state election: Mirani
Party	Candidate	Votes	%	±%
National	Ted Malone	12,399	52.2	+0.9
Labor	Deb Green	9,517	40.0	+5.2
Independent	Rob Robinson	1,847	7.8	+7.8
Total formal votes		23,763	98.2	−0.1
Informal votes		437	1.8	+0.1
Turnout		24,200	92.4	−0.7
Two-party-preferred result
National	Ted Malone	13,001	56.5	−4.1
Labor	Deb Green	10,020	43.5	+4.1
National hold		Swing	−4.1	

2004 Queensland state election: Mirani
Party	Candidate	Votes	%	±%
National	Ted Malone	11,733	51.3	+16.4
Labor	Mark D'Elboux	7,955	34.8	+1.6
One Nation	Rob Robinson	2,434	10.6	−10.9
Independent	Ed Vaughan	741	3.2	−0.1
Total formal votes		22,863	98.3	−0.3
Informal votes		393	1.7	+0.4
Turnout		23,256	93.3	−1.0
Two-party-preferred result
National	Ted Malone	12,958	60.6	+6.8
Labor	Mark D'Elboux	8,409	39.4	−6.8
National hold		Swing	+6.8	

2001 Queensland state election: Mirani
Party	Candidate	Votes	%	±%
National	Ted Malone	7,672	34.9	+0.7
Labor	Richard Staker	7,296	33.2	−1.2
One Nation	Rob Robinson	4,729	21.5	−7.5
Independent	Barry Gomersall	1,546	7.0	+7.0
Independent	Ed Vaughan	729	3.3	+3.3
Total formal votes		21,972	98.6	
Informal votes		303	1.4	
Turnout		22,275	94.3	
Two-party-preferred result
National	Ted Malone	9,366	53.8	−0.2
Labor	Richard Staker	8,042	46.2	+0.2
National hold		Swing	−0.2	

=== Elections in the 1990s ===
1998 Queensland state election: Mirani
Party	Candidate	Votes	%	±%
Labor	Barry Gomersall	8,768	35.6	−3.3
National	Ted Malone	8,145	33.1	−22.9
One Nation	Edward Vaughan	7,054	28.7	+28.7
Australia First	Lawrence Hewitt	431	1.8	+1.8
Shooters	Steve Purtill	199	0.8	+0.8
Total formal votes		24,597	98.9	+0.4
Informal votes		265	1.1	−0.4
Turnout		24,862	94.2	+1.5
Two-party-preferred result
National	Ted Malone	11,528	52.7	−6.4
Labor	Barry Gomersall	10,348	47.3	+6.4
National hold		Swing	−6.4	

1995 Queensland state election: Mirani
Party	Candidate	Votes	%	±%
National	Ted Malone	12,461	56.0	+12.7
Labor	Barry Gomersall	8,650	38.9	−1.0
Independent	Ronnie Bell	1,127	5.1	+5.1
Total formal votes		22,238	98.5	−0.1
Informal votes		328	1.5	+0.1
Turnout		22,566	92.7	
Two-party-preferred result
National	Ted Malone	12,965	59.1	+4.7
Labor	Barry Gomersall	8,983	40.9	−4.7
National hold		Swing	+4.7	

1994 Mirani state by-election
Party	Candidate	Votes	%	±%
National	Ted Malone	10,295	52.0	+8.7
Labor	Graeme Hall	7,881	39.8	−0.1
Confederate Action	Arthur Jackson	1,635	8.2	−5.5
Total formal votes		19,811	98.8	+0.2
Informal votes		247	1.2	−0.2
Turnout		20,058	83.7	−8.6
Two-party-preferred result
National	Ted Malone	11,114	57.2	+2.9
Labor	Graeme Hall	8,324	42.8	−2.9
National hold		Swing	+2.9	

1992 Queensland state election: Mirani
Party	Candidate	Votes	%	±%
National	Jim Randell	9,135	43.3	+2.1
Labor	Michael Scriha	8,411	39.9	−5.2
Confederate Action	Trevor Howland	2,896	13.7	+13.7
Liberal	Alf Maher	640	3.0	−8.6
Total formal votes		21,082	98.6	
Informal votes		300	1.4	
Turnout		21,382	92.3	
Two-party-preferred result
National	Jim Randell	10,749	54.3	+2.4
Labor	Michael Scriha	9,035	45.7	−2.4
National hold		Swing	+2.4	

=== Elections in the 1980s ===
1989 Queensland state election: Mirani
Party	Candidate	Votes	%	±%
National	Jim Randell	5,933	46.8	−11.5
Labor	David Robinson	5,659	44.6	+2.9
Liberal	Bevin Coleman	1,093	8.6	+8.6
Total formal votes		12,685	97.7	−0.5
Informal votes		297	2.3	+0.5
Turnout		12,982	93.1	+0.5
Two-party-preferred result
National	Jim Randell	6,788	53.5	−4.8
Labor	David Robinson	5,897	46.5	+4.8
National hold		Swing	−4.8	

1986 Queensland state election: Mirani
Party	Candidate	Votes	%	±%
National	Jim Randell	6,781	58.3	−0.1
Labor	Jeff Gascoyne	4,853	41.7	+0.1
Total formal votes		11,634	98.2	−0.6
Informal votes		211	1.8	+0.6
Turnout		11,845	92.6	−0.1
National hold		Swing	−0.1	

1983 Queensland state election: Mirani
Party	Candidate	Votes	%	±%
National	Jim Randell	8,251	56.6	+19.4
Labor	Jeffrey Gascoyne	6,338	43.4	+5.0
Total formal votes		14,589	98.8	−0.5
Informal votes		176	1.2	+0.5
Turnout		14,765	92.7	+1.5
National hold		Swing	+3.6	

1980 Queensland state election: Mirani
Party	Candidate	Votes	%	±%
Labor	Conrad Nicolai	4,728	38.4	−0.1
National	Jim Randell	4,592	37.2	−24.3
Independent	John Comerford	2,291	18.6	+18.6
Liberal	Leonard Goode	717	5.8	+5.8
Total formal votes		12,328	99.3	+0.6
Informal votes		86	0.7	−0.6
Turnout		12,414	91.2	−1.5
Two-party-preferred result
National	Jim Randell	6,533	53.0	−8.6
Labor	Conrad Nicolai	5,795	47.0	+8.6
National hold		Swing	−8.6	

=== Elections in the 1970s ===
1977 Queensland state election: Mirani
Party	Candidate	Votes	%	±%
National	Tom Newbery	6,514	61.5	−8.1
Labor	Conrad Nicolai	4,069	38.5	+8.1
Total formal votes		10,583	98.7	
Informal votes		138	1.3	
Turnout		10,721	92.7	
National hold		Swing	−8.1	

1974 Queensland state election: Mirani
Party	Candidate	Votes	%	±%
National	Tom Newbery	6,610	69.6	+7.5
Labor	Leslie Dwyer	2,882	30.4	−7.5
Total formal votes		9,492	98.8	0.0
Informal votes		114	1.2	0.0
Turnout		9,606	90.8	−1.7
National hold		Swing	+7.5	

1972 Queensland state election: Mirani
Party	Candidate	Votes	%	±%
Country	Tom Newbery	5,197	62.1	+7.9
Labor	Bernard Kirwan	3,172	37.9	−7.9
Total formal votes		8,369	98.8	
Informal votes		102	1.2	
Turnout		8,471	92.5	
Country hold		Swing	+7.9	

=== Elections in the 1960s ===
1969 Queensland state election: Mirani
Party	Candidate	Votes	%	±%
Country	Tom Newbery	4,352	54.5	+3.3
Labor	Gustav Creber	3,632	45.5	−0.8
Total formal votes		7,984	99.0	−0.1
Informal votes		81	1.0	+0.1
Turnout		8,065	92.8	−2.5
Country hold		Swing	+1.3	

1966 Queensland state election: Mirani
Party	Candidate	Votes	%	±%
Country	Tom Newbery	4,094	51.2	−13.6
Labor	Gustav Creber	3,700	46.3	+11.1
Queensland Labor	Edward Relf	196	2.5	+2.5
Total formal votes		7,990	99.1	−0.2
Informal votes		69	0.9	+0.2
Turnout		8,059	95.3	+0.7
Two-party-preferred result
Country	Tom Newbery	4,253	53.2	−11.6
Labor	Gustav Creber	3,737	46.8	+11.6
Country hold		Swing	−11.6	

1963 Queensland state election: Mirani
Party	Candidate	Votes	%	±%
Country	Ernie Evans	4,923	64.8	+1.9
Labor	George Moody	2,676	35.2	+7.5
Total formal votes		7,599	99.3	+0.5
Informal votes		56	0.7	−0.5
Turnout		7,655	94.6	+2.0
Country hold		Swing	N/A	

1960 Queensland state election: Mirani
Party	Candidate	Votes	%	±%
Country	Ernie Evans	4,670	62.9	
Labor	George Moody	2,053	27.7	
Queensland Labor	Walter O'Grady	697	9.4	
Total formal votes		7,420	98.8	
Informal votes		86	1.2	
Turnout		7,506	92.6	
Turnout		7,506	92.6	
Country hold		Swing		

=== Elections in the 1950s ===
1957 Queensland state election: Mirani
Party	Candidate	Votes	%	±%
Country	Ernie Evans	4,770	56.7	−2.5
Labor	James Chataway	1,889	22.5	−18.3
Queensland Labor	Walter O'Grady	1,749	20.8	+20.8
Total formal votes		8,408	99.0	+0.2
Informal votes		83	1.0	−0.2
Turnout		8,491	95.8	+1.7
Country hold		Swing	+12.4	

1956 Queensland state election: Mirani
Party	Candidate	Votes	%	±%
Country	Ernie Evans	4,751	59.2	+1.3
Labor	Roger Scanlan	3,268	40.8	−1.3
Total formal votes		8,019	98.8	−0.2
Informal votes		97	1.2	+0.2
Turnout		8,116	93.0	−1.8
Country hold		Swing	+1.3	

1953 Queensland state election: Mirani
Party	Candidate	Votes	%	±%
Country	Ernie Evans	4,332	57.9	−5.1
Labor	Roger Scanlan	3,146	42.1	+5.1
Total formal votes		7,478	99.0	−0.3
Informal votes		74	1.0	+0.3
Turnout		7,552	94.8	+2.6
Country hold		Swing	−5.1	

1950 Queensland state election: Mirani
Party	Candidate	Votes	%	±%
Country	Ernie Evans	4,709	63.0	
Labor	Matthew O'Neill	2,764	37.0	
Total formal votes		7,473	99.3	
Informal votes		52	0.7	
Turnout		7,525	92.2	
Country hold		Swing		

=== Elections in the 1940s ===
1947 Queensland state election: Mirani
Party	Candidate	Votes	%	±%
Country	Ernie Evans	4,865	58.1	+25.6
Labor	Ted Walsh	3,511	41.9	−5.7
Total formal votes		8,376	99.0	+0.2
Informal votes		83	1.0	−0.2
Turnout		8,459	90.6	+6.1
Country gain from Labor		Swing	+17.5	

1944 Queensland state election: Mirani
Party	Candidate	Votes	%	±%
Labor	Ted Walsh	3,769	47.6	−11.3
Country	Anthony Coyne	2,576	32.5	−8.6
Independent	John Mulherin	1,581	19.9	+19.9
Total formal votes		7,926	98.8	−0.2
Informal votes		96	1.2	+0.2
Turnout		8,022	84.5	−3.5
Labor hold		Swing	+0.5	

1941 Queensland state election: Mirani
Party	Candidate	Votes	%	±%
Labor	Ted Walsh	5,254	58.9	+10.1
Country	Alexander Kippen	3,665	41.1	+0.6
Total formal votes		8,919	99.0	0.0
Informal votes		86	1.0	0.0
Turnout		9,005	88.0	−3.9
Labor hold		Swing	+4.1	

=== Elections in the 1930s ===
1938 Queensland state election: Mirani
Party	Candidate	Votes	%	±%
Labor	Ted Walsh	4,337	48.8	−0.1
Country	James Wilkie	3,601	40.5	−6.0
Social Credit	Edwin Hill	952	10.7	+6.1
Total formal votes		8,890	99.0	−0.1
Informal votes		89	1.0	+0.1
Turnout		8,979	91.9	−1.0
Two-party-preferred result
Labor	Ted Walsh	4,507	54.8	+3.4
Country	James Wilkie	3,723	45.2	−3.4
Labor hold		Swing	+3.4	

1935 Queensland state election: Mirani
Party	Candidate	Votes	%	±%
Labor	Ted Walsh	4,161	48.9	
CPNP	Arthur Fadden	3,951	46.5	
Social Credit	Philip Kirwan	392	4.6	
Total formal votes		8,504	99.1	
Informal votes		77	0.9	
Turnout		8,581	92.9	
Two-party-preferred result
Labor	Ted Walsh	4,216	51.4	
CPNP	Arthur Fadden	3,992	48.6	
Labor gain from CPNP		Swing		

1932 Queensland state election: Mirani
Party	Candidate	Votes	%	±%
CPNP	Edward Swayne	3,083	45.7	
Labor	Alexander Gardner	2,958	43.8	
Queensland Party	Peter McCowan	711	10.5	
Total formal votes		6,752	99.2	
Informal votes		56	0.8	
Turnout		6,808	92.1	
Two-party-preferred result
CPNP	Edward Swayne	3,549	53.6	
Labor	Alexander Gardner	3,076	46.4	
CPNP hold		Swing		

=== Elections in the 1920s ===
1929 Queensland state election: Mirani
Party	Candidate	Votes	%	±%
CPNP	Edward Swayne	3,698	58.5	+6.3
Labor	John Mulherin	2,628	41.5	−6.3
Total formal votes		6,326	98.7	−0.3
Informal votes		82	1.3	+0.3
Turnout		6,408	85.7	+4.4
CPNP hold		Swing	+6.3	

1926 Queensland state election: Mirani
Party	Candidate	Votes	%	±%
CPNP	Edward Swayne	2,936	52.2	+1.2
Labor	John Mulherin	2,690	47.8	−1.2
Total formal votes		5,626	99.0	−0.3
Informal votes		58	1.0	+0.3
Turnout		5,684	81.3	−1.6
CPNP hold		Swing	+1.2	

1923 Queensland state election: Mirani
Party	Candidate	Votes	%	±%
Country	Edward Swayne	2,670	51.0	−4.7
Labor	Henry Turner	2,563	49.0	+4.7
Total formal votes		5,233	99.3	+0.2
Informal votes		35	0.7	−0.2
Turnout		5,268	82.9	+2.2
Country hold		Swing	−4.7	

1920 Queensland state election: Mirani
Party	Candidate	Votes	%	±%
Northern Country	Edward Swayne	2,293	55.7	+2.1
Labor	Maurice Hynes	1,820	44.3	−2.1
Total formal votes		4,113	99.1	+0.5
Informal votes		37	0.9	−0.5
Independent Country gain from National		Swing	N/A	

=== Elections in the 1910s ===
1918 Queensland state election: Mirani
Party	Candidate	Votes	%	±%
National	Edward Swayne	1,971	53.6	+3.7
Labor	Maurice Hynes	1,707	46.4	+2.6
Total formal votes		3,678	98.6	+2.0
Informal votes		51	1.4	−2.0
Turnout		3,729	78.6	−6.7
National hold		Swing	+1.0	

1915 Queensland state election: Mirani
Party	Candidate	Votes	%	±%
Liberal	Edward Swayne	1,569	49.9	−18.9
Labor	John Binstead	1,337	43.8	+12.6
Farmers' Union	Henry Turner	201	6.4	+6.4
Total formal votes		3,147	96.6	−2.0
Informal votes		110	3.4	+2.0
Turnout		3,257	85.3	+21.4
Two-party-preferred result
Liberal	Edward Swayne	1,579	52.6	−16.2
Labor	John Binstead	1,420	47.4	+16.2
Liberal hold		Swing	−16.2	

1912 Queensland state election: Mirani
Party	Candidate	Votes	%	±%
Liberal	Edward Swayne	1,730	68.8	
Labor	Philip Kirwan	785	31.2	
Total formal votes		2,515	98.6	
Informal votes		36	1.4	
Turnout		2,551	63.9	
Liberal hold		Swing		
