= Barry Gomersall =

Australian rugby league referee (1945–2007)

Barry Seymour Gomersall (19 October 1945 – 9 February 2007) was an Australian rugby league referee. Gomersall refereed six rugby league internationals and nine State of Origin series matches.

Gomersall was born in Liverpool, England and migrated to Australia when he was six months old. He attended Indooroopilly State High School.

Nicknamed "the Grasshopper", Gomersall was known for his thin legs inside tight shorts and his habit of ignoring on-field fights. First appointed to referee State of Origin by the Queensland Rugby League in 1982, Gomersall was often accused by New South Wales supporters of bias. A reporter from New South Wales once asked: "How do you account for the fact that in your nine matches Queensland won seven and NSW won only two?", Gomersall was said to have replied "Well, surely anyone's entitled to two bad games." Gomersall placed a high priority on personal fitness saying "if someone is going to score a try, I want to be there first".

Gomersall was a long time Queensland Rail employee. After his refereeing career, Gomersall entered Queensland politics, standing for the electoral district of Mirani in five elections.

Barry Gomersall died in Sarina in central Queensland on 9 February 2007 from prostate cancer aggravated by collision with livestock on his farm.
