= James Chataway =

Australian politician

The Honourable James Chataway
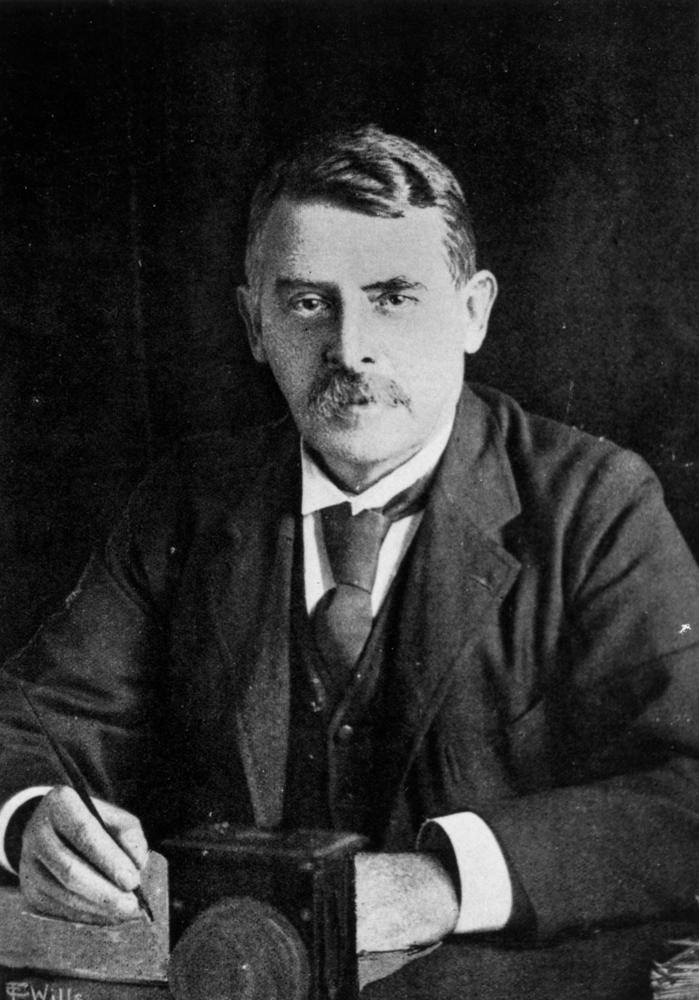
- The Late Hon. J. V. Chataway, MLA, Minister for Agriculture

Member of the Queensland Legislative Assembly for Mackay
- In office 29 April 1893 – 12 April 1901 Serving with David Dalrymple
- Preceded by: Maurice Black
- Succeeded by: Walter Paget

Personal details
- Born: James Vincent Chataway; 6 September 1852 Warwickshire, England
- Died: 12 April 1901 (aged 48) Brisbane, Queensland, Australia
- Resting place: Cleveland Cemetery
- Party: Ministerialist
- Spouse: Jessie Carlyle Little (m.1882 d.1934)
- Relatives: Thomas Drinkwater Chataway (brother), Gertrude Chataway (sister)
- Occupation: Plantation owner, Newspaper proprietor

James Vincent Chataway (6 September 1852 – 12 April 1901) was a member of the Queensland Legislative Assembly.

== Biography ==
Chataway was born in Warwickshire, England, the son of James Chataway and his wife Elizabeth (née Drinkwater) and was educated at Winchester College. He was at first destined for the Indian civil service but after a period of ill-health this was abandoned and he instead headed to Australia, arriving in 1873.

After his arrival he was in Victoria and New South Wales getting pastoral experience before arriving in Queensland where he worked as an auctioneer and owned a livery stable. He then took up an interest in Eton Plantation in the Mackay region before taking up the role as editor of the Mackay Mercury in 1883 and three years later owner of the newspaper. In 1892 he established the Mackay Sugar Journal and Tropical Cultivator.

On 8 December 1882 Chataway married Jessie Carlyle Little and together had two sons and two daughters. He died in April 1901 and was buried in the Church of England Cemetery, Ormiston (now known as the Cleveland Cemetery).

== Public career ==
Chataway, representing the Ministerialists, became the junior member in the 2 member electorate of Mackay at the 1893 Queensland colonial election. He represented Mackay until his death in 1901. During his time in parliament he held the following ministerial portfolios:

- Minister without Office 25 February 1898 to 2 March 1898
- Secretary for Agriculture 2 March 1898 to 12 October 1898
- Secretary for Public Lands and Agriculture 12 October 1898 to 1 December 1899
- Secretary for Public Lands and Agriculture 7 December 1899 to 12 April 1901

== Street name ==
A number of street names in the Brisbane suburb of Carina Heights are identical to the surnames of former Members of the Queensland Legislative Assembly. One of these is Chataway Street.

Parliament of Queensland
Preceded by Maurice Black	Member for Mackay; 1893–1901; Served alongside: David Dalrymple	Succeeded by Walter Paget
