= Glen Kelly (politician) =

Australian politician

Glen Kelly MP

Member of the Queensland Legislative Assembly for Mirani
- Incumbent
- Assumed office 26 October 2024
- Preceded by: Stephen Andrew

Personal details
- Party: Liberal National
- Profession: Farmer; politician

Glen Kelly is an Australian politician. He was elected member of the Legislative Assembly of Queensland for Mirani in the 2024 Queensland state election.

Six generations of his family have lived in Kalapa. He is a farmer by profession.

Parliament of Queensland
Preceded by Stephen Andrew	Member for Mirani; 2024–present	Incumbent
