= Ted Malone (Australian politician) =

Australian politician

Member of the Queensland Legislative Assembly for Mirani
- In office 30 April 1994 – 31 January 2015
- Preceded by: Jim Randell
- Succeeded by: Jim Pearce

Personal details
- Born: George Edward Malone; 14 November 1943 (age 82) Mackay, Queensland, Australia
- Party: Liberal National
- Other political affiliations: The Nationals
- Occupation: Grazier, Sugarcane farmer

George Edward (Ted) Malone (born 14 November 1943) is an Australian politician. He was a member of the Queensland Legislative Assembly from 1994 to 2015, representing the electorate of Mirani for the Nationals and its successor the Liberal National Party. He was Assistant Minister for Emergency Volunteers between November 2012 and January 2015.

Malone was born in Mackay, and was a cane farmer and grazier before entering politics. He had also served as Chairman of Directors of the Australian Cane Farmers Association. He is married with two daughters. Malone was elected to the Legislative Assembly at a 1994 by-election for the safe National seat of Mirani, following the resignation of Jim Randell.

He was promoted to the shadow ministry after the defeat of the National-Liberal government at the 1998 state election, and served in a range of portfolios including emergency services, public works and housing, employment and training, local government and planning, northern development, seniors, and families and communities. He served as Deputy opposition whip from 2004 to 2005. Malone remained in the shadow ministry until the Liberal National victory at the 2012 state election, but was left out of the initial Newman Ministry.

In November 2012, filling the vacancy caused by the resignation of Bruce Flegg and the promotion to cabinet of assistant minister Tim Mander, Malone was promoted to Assistant Minister for Emergency Volunteers. He did not contest the 2015 state election.

Parliament of Queensland
Preceded by Jim Randell	Member for Mirani; 1994–2015	Succeeded by Jim Pearce
