= Walter Paget =

Australian politician

The Honourable Walter Paget
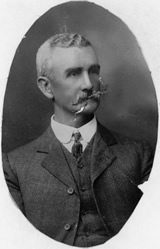

Member of the Queensland Legislative Assembly for Mackay
- In office 11 May 1901 – 22 May 1915 Serving with David Dalrymple, Albert Fudge, Edward Swayne
- Preceded by: James Chataway
- Succeeded by: William Forgan Smith

Personal details
- Born: Walter Trueman Paget; 7 February 1854 Hagley, Worcestershire, England
- Died: 23 December 1930 (aged 76) Mooloolah, Queensland, Australia
- Resting place: Mooloolah Cemetery
- Party: Ministerialist
- Other political affiliations: Opposition
- Spouse(s): Minnie Jane Downing (m.1884 d.1884), Alice Elizabeth Ruth Haden (m.1889)
- Occupation: Sugar plant and mill owner

Walter Trueman Paget (7 February 1854 – 23 December 1930) was a farmer and politician in Queensland, Australia. He was a Member of the Queensland Legislative Assembly.

== Biography ==
Paget was born in Hagley, Worcestershire, the son of Arthur Paget and his wife Esther (née Gray). After his arrival in Australia in the early 1870s, he, along with his brothers, J.G. and Arthur Paget, selected land at Nindaroo, now a suburb of modern-day Mackay. J.G. Paget soon drowned in the Pioneer River when crossing the river on horseback.

The other brothers first engaged in maize and general farming but amalgamated the blocks they had selected and entered the sugar industry which was in its infancy in the Mackay area. The brothers then erected their own mill and began crushing their own cane as well as the cane of the local neighbouring farms. The mill continued until the 1890s when it was closed.

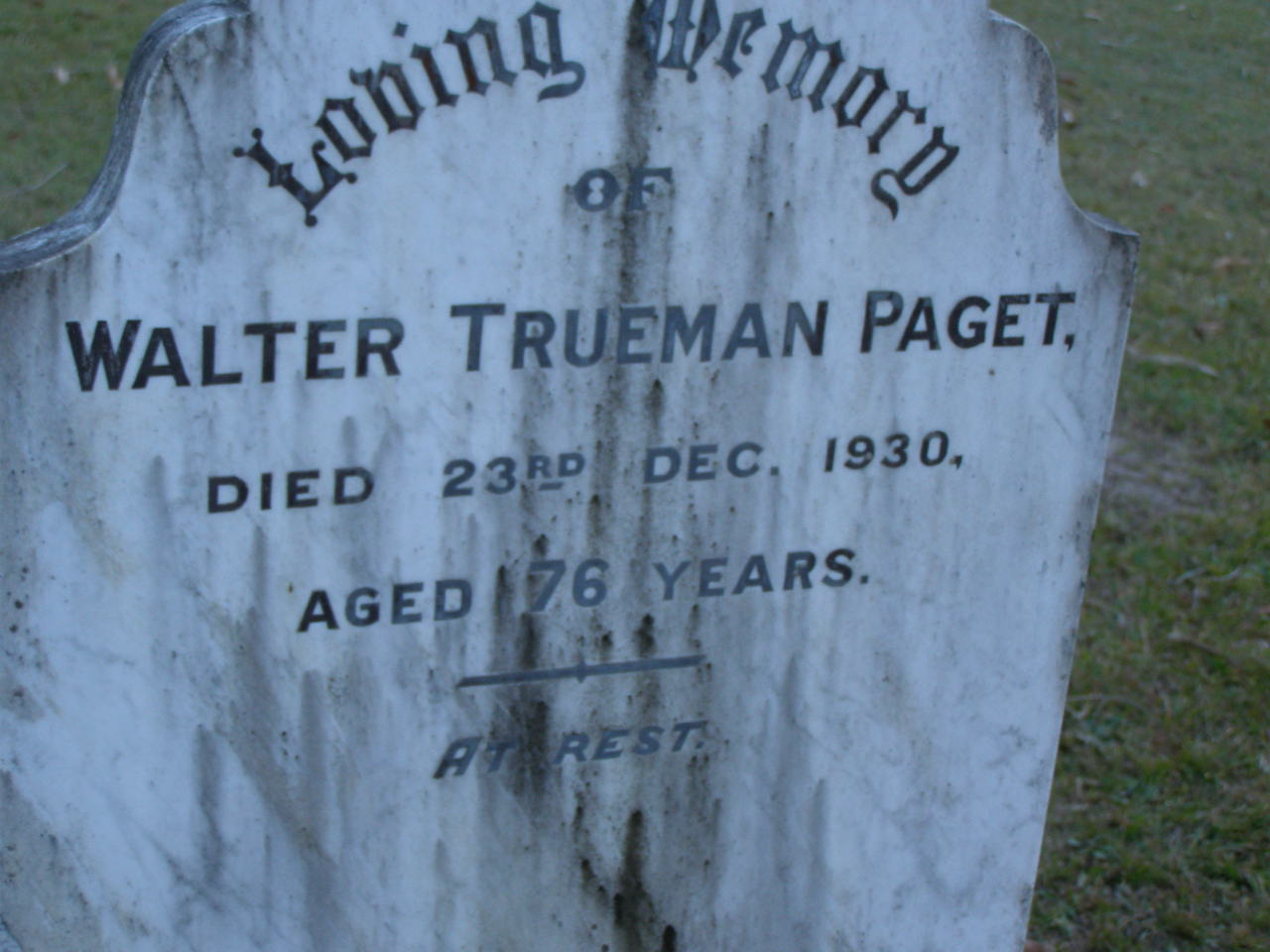
Headstone in Mooloolah Cemetery, 2007

On 9 August 1884 Paget married Minnie Jane Downing. Minnie died in December of the same year and he then married Alice Elizabeth Ruth Haden on 11 April 1889 in Adelaide and together had two sons and two daughters. On 23 December 1930 Paget died at his home in Mooloolah, apparently after taking a stroke and falling on a knife. His daughter, Miss M. Paget, visiting from Townsville discovered him and a doctor was summoned but he was beyond help. Paget was buried in the Mooloolah Cemetery.

== Public career ==
Paget was a Councilor on the Pioneer Divisional Board from 1883 until 1890 and its Chairman from 1890 until 1895 and in 1901. When the member for Mackay, James Chataway died in 1901, Paget won the resulting by-election. He went on to represent the electorate until the 1915 Queensland state election when he retired from politics.

He was the Secretary for Railways and Agriculture from 1908 to 1911 and Secretary for Railways from 1911 to 1915. The Mackay suburb of Paget was named in his honour.

Parliament of Queensland
Preceded by James Chataway	Member for Mackay; 1901–1915; Served alongside: David Dalrymple, Albert Fudge, Edward Swayne	Succeeded by William Forgan Smith
