= Albert Fudge =

Australian politician

Member of the Queensland Legislative Assembly for Mackay
- In office 27 August 1904 – 18 May 1907 Serving with Walter Paget
- Preceded by: David Dalrymple
- Succeeded by: Edward Swayne

Personal details
- Born: Albert John Wellman Fudge; 30 January 1858 Yeovil, Somerset, England
- Died: 7 November 1949 (aged 91) Mackay, Queensland, Australia
- Resting place: Mackay Cemetery
- Party: Labour Party
- Spouse: Naomi Brown (m.1884 d.1946)
- Occupation: Carpenter

Albert John Wellman Fudge (30 January 1858 – 7 November 1949) was a member of the Queensland Legislative Assembly.

== Biography ==
Fudge was born in Yeovil, Somerset, the son of John Wellman Fudge and his wife Sarah (née Northover). He was educated in Yeovil and arrived in Queensland in 1884. He continued the craft he had learned in England as a carpenter until 1895 when he took up a selection of land at Mirani.

On 27 December 1884 he married Naomi Brown (died 1946) and together had three sons and three daughters. Fudge died in November 1949 and his funeral proceeded from the Central Methodist Church in Mackay to the Mackay Cemetery.

== Public career ==
Fudge, representing the Labour Party, won one of the seats in the two-member electorate of Mackay at the 1904 Queensland state election, serving alongside Walter Paget. He did not stand at the following state election held in 1907.

Parliament of Queensland
Preceded by David Dalrymple	Member for Mackay; 1904–1907; Served alongside: Walter Paget	Succeeded by Edward Swayne
