= Nigel Dalton =

Australian politician

Nigel Dalton MP
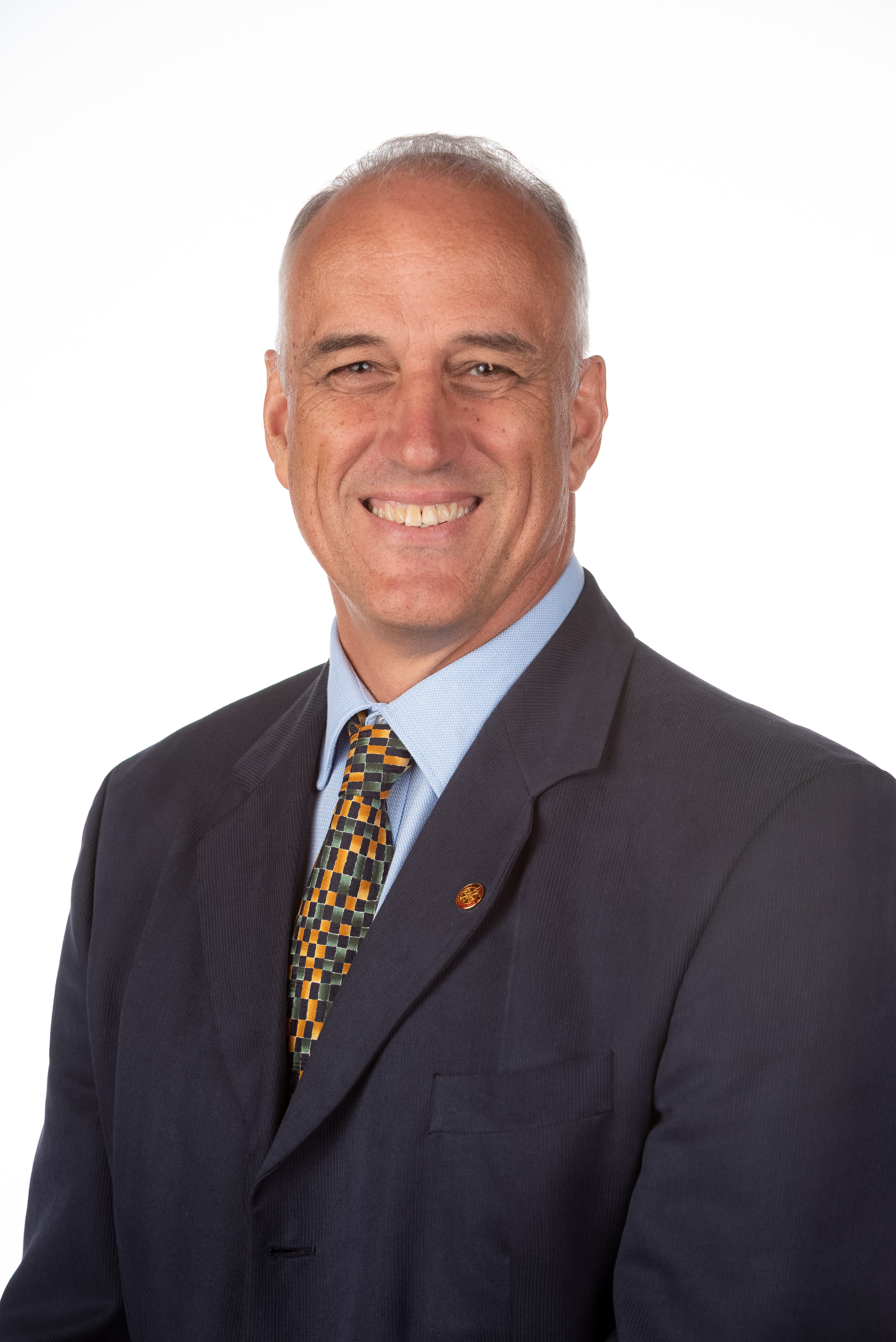
- Nigel Dalton MP

Member of the Queensland Legislative Assembly for Mackay
- Incumbent
- Assumed office 26 October 2024
- Preceded by: Julieanne Gilbert
- Constituency: Mackay

Personal details
- Born: Belfast, Northern Ireland
- Party: Liberal National
- Spouse: Sue Dalton
- Children: Alice Medica, Angus Dalton
- Website: www.nigeldalton.com.au

Nigel Dalton is an Australian politician and former police officer, currently serving as the Liberal National Party (LNP) Member for Mackay in the Legislative Assembly of Queensland. He won the seat in the 2024 Queensland state election with a 17.2% swing, making history as the first LNP representative—or member from any of its predecessor parties—elected in Mackay, and the first conservative to hold the seat in over a century.

Before entering politics, Dalton served as a Queensland Police Officer for 22 years, specialising in crime prevention and community engagement. He retired in mid-2024 due to QLD Police age requirements and to contest the state election.

Dalton's dedication to public service has been widely recognised. In 2023, he was named Mackay's Citizen of the Year, and in 2022, Neighbourhood Watch Australasia awarded him the Police Commissioner's Award for his contributions to crime prevention. In 2018, he received a Queensland Police Service Bronze Award for his commitment to community policing initiatives.

== Early life and career ==
Nigel Dalton was born in Belfast, Northern Ireland, as the youngest of four siblings. His father was a university lecturer at Queen's University Belfast, and before settling in Northern Ireland, the family had lived in Freetown, Sierra Leone, where his father taught at Fourah Bay College.

Dalton began his education in Northern Ireland but later attended school in Lusaka, Zambia, when his father took a temporary professor role at the University of Zambia. After returning to Belfast, he completed his secondary education at an all-boys grammar school in South Belfast, where he excelled in swimming, winning the Irish Schools 100-metre short-course backstroke at age 17.

After finishing school, he enrolled in a technical college, studying electronics. Inspired by friends who had joined the Royal Ulster Constabulary (RUC), Dalton decided to pursue a career in law enforcement and was accepted into police training at Enniskillen, County Fermanagh.

== Police Service ==
=== United Kingdom ===
Dalton began his policing career in 1983 with the Royal Ulster Constabulary (RUC) in Northern Ireland, serving during the height of The Troubles. His early years included general duties in Lisburn before transitioning to the Divisional Mobile Support Unit, where he was involved in frontline security and law enforcement operations. In 1988, he was posted to Donegal Pass, Belfast, before making the decision to transfer to the Dorset Police in England in 1990.

During his time in Dorset, Dalton gained extensive experience in general policing and community engagement. In 1998, he moved into firearms training, specialising in the instruction and regulation of armed response units. He served with Dorset Police until 2002, when he migrated to Australia and joined the Queensland Police Service.

==== UK Police Service Roles ====
Royal Ulster Constabulary (1983–1990)

General Duties, Lisburn (1984–1986)

Divisional Mobile Support Unit (1986–1988)

General Duties, Donegal Pass, Belfast (1988–1990)

Dorset Police (1990–2002)

General Duties (1990–1998)

Firearms Training (1998–2002)

=== Queensland ===
Dalton joined the Queensland Police Service (QPS) in 2002 as a recruit, completing training at the Oxley Academy in Brisbane before being posted to Mackay in January 2003. He served in general duties until 2006, when he transitioned to Crime Prevention Coordinator, a role he held until his retirement in 2024.

As Crime Prevention Coordinator, Dalton played a key role in domestic violence prevention, youth engagement, and public safety initiatives. He was instrumental in the development of community-based intervention programs, including collaborations with local schools, universities, and crime prevention organisations with projects like CHOICES, Safety Circus, Fatal 5, Dark Side of Technology (cyber safety), Elder Abuse education, Drugs Education, Safer Living to name a few that were presented to many age groups. Dalton was the Neighbourhood watch coordinator in the Mackay Police District. Dalton was the Neighbourhood watch coordinator in the Mackay Police District.

==== Queensland Police Service Roles ====
Queensland Police Service (2002–2024)

Recruit, Brisbane (2002–2003)

General Duties, Mackay (2003–2006)

Crime Prevention Coordinator, Mackay (2006–2024)

== Politics ==
In 2024, Nigel Dalton was elected as the Member for Mackay in the Queensland Legislative Assembly, securing the seat with a significant 17.2% swing at the 2024 Queensland state election. His victory marked a historic shift, making him the first representative from the Liberal National Party (LNP) or its predecessor parties to win the seat and the first conservative member in over a century.

Dalton delivered his maiden speech to parliament on 28 November 2024, where he reflected on his journey from Belfast, Northern Ireland, to Australia, his career in policing, and his longstanding commitment to the Mackay community. He acknowledged his election opponents and paid tribute to Mackay's civic institutions while outlining his key priorities, including tackling youth crime, improving healthcare services, addressing cost-of-living pressures, and supporting victims of crime. Drawing from his experience in crime prevention and domestic violence intervention, he emphasised the importance of early intervention and stronger community engagement. Concluding his speech, Dalton reaffirmed his dedication to public service, adapting the Queensland Police Service's motto to his new parliamentary role: "With honour I will continue to serve."

=== Political views ===
Dalton is a member of the Liberal National Party (LNP) in Queensland.

During the election campaign Dalton and the LNP promised $91M in the Mackay and Whitsunday regions, this funding included $1M for Australian Street Aid Project, $800K for Mackay Hockey Association, $20M for Peak Downs Highway and coal roads, $3M for Mackay State High School and Mackay North State High School and more.

=== Election results ===
2024 Queensland state election: Mackay
Party	Candidate	Votes	%	±%
Liberal National	Nigel Dalton	15,155	45.99	+14.04
Labor	Belinda Hassan	9,985	30.30	−16.17
One Nation	Kylee Stanton	3,864	11.73	−0.86
Greens	Paula Creen	1,635	4.96	+1.56
Legalise Cannabis	Ben Gauci	1,625	4.93	+0.55
Family First	Norman Martin	689	2.09	+2.09
Total formal votes		32,953	95.50	−0.49
Informal votes		1,551	4.50	+0.49
Turnout		34,504	85.41	−0.46
Two-party-preferred result
Liberal National	Nigel Dalton	19,839	60.20	+16.92
Labor	Belinda Hassan	13,114	39.80	−16.92
Liberal National gain from Labor		Swing	+16.92	

== Personal life ==
Dalton lives in Mackay with his wife, Sue. He has two adult children. He remains an active member of the North Mackay Sinkers Masters Swimming Club, continuing his passion for swimming (pool and open water), which began in his youth. Outside of politics, he enjoys watching cricket and supporting both local and national teams. Dalton is also actively involved in community service organisations and maintains a strong interest in youth development programs, particularly those focused on sports and crime prevention initiatives.

== Awards ==
Title	Year	Awarding organisation
Awards of Excellence	2009	Queensland Police Service
Awards of Excellence	2011	Queensland Police Service
Awards of Excellence	2015	Queensland Police Service
Awards of Excellence	2018	Queensland Police Service
Police Liaison Officer of the Year	2015	Neighbourhood Watch
Police Liaison Officer of the Year	2016	Neighbourhood Watch
Police Liaison Officer of the Year	2018	Neighbourhood Watch
Police Liaison Officer of the Year	2021	Neighbourhood Watch
Liaison Officer of the Year	2017	Queensland Neighbourhood Watch
Assistant Commissioners Certificate	2022	Queensland Police Service
Companion of the university	2017	Central Queensland University
Bronze award	2018	Queensland Police Service
Police Commissioner's Award	2022	Neighbourhood Watch Australasia
Citizen of the Year	2023	Mackay Regional Council

== Community ==
Position	Organisation
Member	Neighbourhood Watch Mackay Northern Beaches
Life Member	Dolphins Soccer Club
Member	Beaches Baptist Church (Mackay)
Member	North Mackay Sinkers – Masters Swimming Club

Parliament of Queensland
Preceded by Julieanne Gilbert	Member for Mackay; 2024–present	Incumbent
