= Fred Graham (politician) =

Australian politician (1899–1996)

Member of the Queensland Legislative Assembly for Mackay
- In office 20 March 1943 – 17 May 1969
- Preceded by: William Forgan Smith
- Succeeded by: Ed Casey

Personal details
- Born: Frederick Dickson Graham; 13 May 1899 Croydon, Queensland, Australia
- Died: 11 June 1996 (aged 97) Brisbane, Queensland, Australia
- Party: Labor
- Spouse: Agnes May Bowling (m.1922 d.1977)
- Occupation: Engine driver

Frederick Dickson Graham (13 May 1899 – 11 June 1996) was a member of the Queensland Legislative Assembly.

== Biography ==
Graham was born at Croydon, Queensland, the son of Joseph Henry Graham and his wife Louisa Jane (née Stephens). When he arrived in Queensland he took up farming. He attended primary school in Croydon and by 1916 he was working as an engine driver and cleaner for Queensland Railways. From 1925 until his election to parliament he worked as a fireman in Mackay.

On 14 June 1922 he married Agnes May Bowling (died 1977) and together had one daughter. Graham died in Brisbane in June 1996 and was cremated at the Mt Thompson Crematorium.

== Public career ==
When the Premier of Queensland, William Forgan Smith, retired from politics in December 1942, Graham, a fellow Labor Party member, won the resultant by-election. He went on to represent the electorate for 26 years before retiring from politics at the 1969 Queensland state election.

In 1972 and after his retirement, Graham was expelled from the Labor Party after criticising the decision of the special Labor convention that year in not re-endorsing Ed Casey, who successfully stood in the 1972 state election as an Independent Labor candidate. He was re-admitted to the party in 1977 which was seen in part as a further step in coercing Casey to return to the party. At the time of his death in 1996 he was the oldest former member of the House and the last surviving member of Frank Cooper's government from 1942 to 1946.

Parliament of Queensland
Preceded by William Forgan Smith	Member for Mackay; 1943–1969	Succeeded by Ed Casey
