= David Dalrymple (Australian politician) =

Australian chemist and politician (1840–1912)

The Honourable David Dalrymple
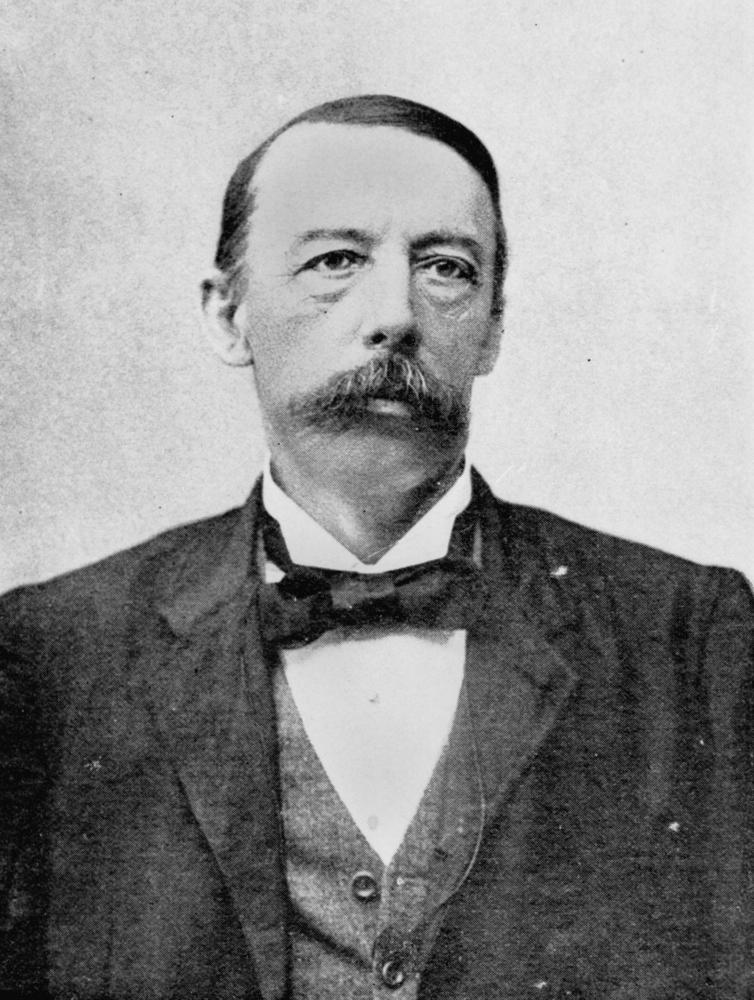

Member of the Queensland Legislative Assembly for Mackay
- In office 5 May 1888 – 27 August 1904 Serving with Maurice Black, James Chataway, Walter Paget
- Preceded by: New seat
- Succeeded by: Albert Fudge

Personal details
- Born: David Hay Dalrymple; 14 December 1840 Newbury, Berkshire, England
- Died: 1 September 1912 (aged 71) Queensland, Australia
- Resting place: Toowong Cemetery
- Party: Ministerial
- Spouse: Euphemia Margaret McLean (m.1880)
- Occupation: Chemist

David Hay Dalrymple (1840–1912) was an Australian pastoralist, chemist/druggist, and politician in Queensland, Australia. He was a Mayor of Mackay and a Member of the Queensland Legislative Assembly.

== Early life ==
Dalrymple was born on 14 December 1840 in Newbury, Berkshire, England, the son of James Dalrymple and his wife Georgina (née Hay). He was educated at the Independent College in Taunton and attended lectures at the Bristol Medical School.

Dalrymple arrived in Mackay in 1863. He was married to Euphemia Margaret McLean in Mackay on 23 Dec 1880 and had two sons and two daughters. He was a pastoralist, chemist and druggist.

== Politics ==
Dalrymple served on community boards and served as the Mayor of Mackay from 1869 to 1871 and again in 1873–1874.

He was a Member of the Queensland Legislative Assembly for Mackay from 5 May 1888 to 27 August 1904.

== Later life ==
Dalrymple died from heart failure in his sleep at his residence Dalry at Crescent Road, Hamilton, Brisbane, Queensland on 1 September 1912. He was buried in Toowong Cemetery on 2 September 1912. Flags were flown at half-mast in Mackay as a mark of respect.

Parliament of Queensland
New seat	Member for Mackay; 1888–1904; Served alongside: Maurice Black, James Chataway, Walter Paget	Succeeded by Albert Fudge
