= Electoral district of Mackay =

State electoral district of Queensland, Australia

Mackay Queensland—Legislative Assembly
- Electoral map of Mackay 2017
- State: Queensland
- MP: Nigel Dalton
- Party: Liberal National
- Namesake: Mackay
- Electors: 38,199 (2020)
- Area: 80 km^{2} (30.9 sq mi)
- Demographic: Provincial/Regional
- Coordinates: 21°7′S 149°13′E
Electorates around Mackay:
Whitsunday	Whitsunday	Coral Sea
Whitsunday	Mackay	Coral Sea
Mirani	Mirani	Coral Sea

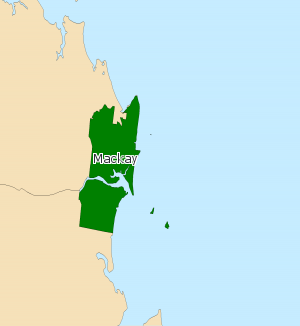
Electoral map of Mackay 2008

Mackay is a Legislative Assembly of Queensland electoral district in North Queensland, Australia, encompassing the inner suburbs of the city of Mackay. Outer suburbs of the city are included in the neighbouring electorates of Mirani and Whitsunday.

Mackay was held by the Labor Party for all but five years from 1915 to 2024. Labor's dominance in the seat began in 1915 when it was won by William Forgan Smith, who served as Premier of Queensland from 1932 to 1942. He retired undefeated in 1942 and was replaced by long-serving backbencher Fred Graham. who held it until his retirement in 1969. Graham was succeeded by Ed Casey, who lost Labor preselection after only one term in 1972. Casey recontested as an independent and won, doing so again in 1975 before being readmitted to the party in 1977. He subsequently served as Labor leader from 1978 to 1982, and later as a minister in the Goss Labor government. He was succeeded upon his retirement by Tim Mulherin, who was comfortably elected six more times, winning with more than 60% of the vote in 2006.

For the better part of a century, Mackay was a safe Labor seat, remaining in Labor hands even at the height of Joh Bjelke-Petersen's popularity. Aside from Casey's stint as an independent, Labor's grip on the seat was only seriously threatened twice before 2012. In 1957, in the aftermath of the Queensland Labor split, Graham was held to only 42 percent of the vote. In 1986, the apex of Bjelke-Petersen's dominance, Casey was reduced to 53 percent of the two-party vote. At the 2012 election it became the most marginal ALP seat with Mulherin winning 50.5% of the two-party preferred vote. Mulherin was elected deputy leader of what remained of Labor; it was reduced to only seven seats.

Mulherin retired in 2015, and the seat reverted to its traditional status as a safe Labor seat, with Julieanne Gilbert retaining the seat for Labor on a swing of 12 percent. She retired in 2024, and the Liberal National Party's Nigel Dalton finally broke the long Labor run in Mackay as his party won government. Dalton took the seat on a swing of over 17 percent, enough to technically make Mackay a safe LNP seat.

== Members for Mackay ==
First incarnation (1878–1888, 1 member)
Member	Party	Term
Francis Amhurst	Unaligned	1878–1881
Maurice Hume Black	Unaligned	1881–1888
Second incarnation (1888–1912, 2 members)
Member	Party	Term
Maurice Hume Black	Unaligned	1888–1893
David Dalrymple	Ministerialist	1888–1904
James Chataway	Ministerialist	1893–1901
Walter Paget	Ministerialist/Opposition	1901–1912
Albert Fudge	Labor	1904–1907
Edward Swayne	Opposition	1907–1912
Third incarnation (1912–present, 1 member)
Member	Party	Term
Walter Paget	Ministerialist/Opposition	1912–1915
William Forgan Smith	Labor	1915–1942
Fred Graham	Labor	1943–1969
Ed Casey	Labor	1969–1972
Ed Casey	Independent	1972–1977
Ed Casey	Labor	1977–1995
Tim Mulherin	Labor	1995–2015
Julieanne Gilbert	Labor	2015–2024
Nigel Dalton	Liberal National	2024–present

== Election results ==
2024 Queensland state election: Mackay
Party	Candidate	Votes	%	±%
Liberal National	Nigel Dalton	15,155	45.99	+14.04
Labor	Belinda Hassan	9,985	30.30	−16.17
One Nation	Kylee Stanton	3,864	11.73	−0.86
Greens	Paula Creen	1,635	4.96	+1.56
Legalise Cannabis	Ben Gauci	1,625	4.93	+0.55
Family First	Norman Martin	689	2.09	+2.09
Total formal votes		32,953	95.50	−0.49
Informal votes		1,551	4.50	+0.49
Turnout		34,504	85.41	−0.46
Two-party-preferred result
Liberal National	Nigel Dalton	19,839	60.20	+16.92
Labor	Belinda Hassan	13,114	39.80	−16.92
Liberal National gain from Labor		Swing	+16.92	
