= Tim Mulherin =

Australian politician (1957–2020)

The Honourable Tim Mulherin AM

Deputy Leader of the Opposition of Queensland
- In office 28 March 2012 – 31 January 2015
- Leader: Annastacia Palaszczuk
- Preceded by: Tim Nicholls
- Succeeded by: John-Paul Langbroek

Shadow Minister for Tourism, Major Events and the Commonwealth Games
- In office 5 August 2014 – 14 February 2015
- Leader: Annastacia Palaszczuk
- Preceded by: Annastacia Palaszczuk
- Succeeded by: Jann Stuckey (Tourism and Major Events); John-Paul Langbroek (Commonwealth Games)

Shadow Minister for State Development, Infrastructure and Planning, Racing and Local Government
- In office 19 April 2012 – 14 February 2015
- Leader: Annastacia Palaszczuk
- Preceded by: Jeff Seeney (State Development, Infrastructure and Planning); Tim Nicholls (Racing); David Gibson (Local Government)
- Succeeded by: Andrew Cripps (State Development); Tim Nicholls (Infrastructure and Planning); Jann Stuckey (Racing); Fiona Simpson (Local Government)

Shadow Minister for Agriculture, Fisheries and Forestry
- In office 19 April 2012 – 5 August 2014
- Leader: Annastacia Palaszczuk
- Preceded by: Andrew Cripps (Agriculture); Mark Robinson (Fisheries)
- Succeeded by: Anthony Lynham

Deputy Leader of the Labor Party in Queensland
- In office 28 March 2012 – 31 January 2015
- Leader: Annastacia Palaszczuk
- Preceded by: Andrew Fraser
- Succeeded by: Jackie Trad

Minister for Rural and Regional Queensland
- In office 26 March 2009 – 26 March 2012
- Premier: Anna Bligh
- Preceded by: Desley Boyle (Regional Development)
- Succeeded by: Position abolished

Minister for Primary Industries of Queensland
- In office 12 December 2005 – 26 March 2012
- Premier: Peter Beattie; Anna Bligh
- Preceded by: Gordon Nuttall
- Succeeded by: John McVeigh (Agriculture)

Minister for Fisheries of Queensland
- In office 12 December 2005 – 21 February 2011
- Premier: Peter Beattie; Anna Bligh
- Preceded by: Gordon Nuttall
- Succeeded by: Craig Wallace

Member of the Queensland Parliament for Mackay
- In office 15 July 1995 – 31 January 2015
- Preceded by: Ed Casey
- Succeeded by: Julieanne Gilbert

Personal details
- Born: Timothy Sean Mulherin; 24 August 1957 Mackay, Queensland
- Died: 7 September 2020 (aged 63)
- Party: Labor Party

Timothy Sean Mulherin AM (24 August 1957 – 7 September 2020) was an Australian politician and member of the Australian Labor Party, who was the MP for Mackay in the Legislative Assembly of Queensland from 1995 to 2015, serving as Deputy Leader of the Opposition from 2012 to 2015.

== Early life and career ==
Born in Mackay, he was a clerk on the Mackay Electricity Board before becoming involved in politics.

== Political career ==
From 1994 to 1995 he was a state organiser of the Labor Party. In 1995, he was elected to the Legislative Assembly of Queensland as the Labor member for Mackay, replacing Ed Casey, a former ALP leader. He served as a backbencher until he was named to the Beattie Ministry to replace the disgraced Gordon Nuttall as Minister for Primary Industries and Fisheries in December 2005. He was given additional responsibility for Regional Development in 2009, and his title was recast as Minister for Primary Industries, Fisheries and Rural and Regional Queensland. In February 2011, his title was again changed, this time to Minister for Agriculture, Food and Regional Economies

Mulherin was one of just seven successful Labor candidates at the landslide 2012 Queensland state election. Following the election, he was elected unopposed as deputy leader of the Shadow Ministry of Annastacia Palaszczuk and hence Deputy Opposition Leader.

During the 2015 election campaign, Mulherin announced his retirement citing family and health reasons but remained as Deputy Opposition Leader until polling day. At the time of his retirement, he was the longest-serving Labor member of the Legislative Assembly, and the only one to have previously served in Opposition prior to 2012, having been in Parliament during the 1996–98 Coalition ministry of Rob Borbidge.

== Personal life ==
Tim Mulherin was married to Erin and had three children, Declan, Liam and Rory. He died of cancer on 7 September 2020 at the age of 63.

After his death, in June 2022 Mulherin was posthumously appointed Member of the Order of Australia in the 2022 Queen's Birthday Honours for "significant service to the people and Parliament of Queensland".

Parliament of Queensland
| Preceded by Ed Casey | Member for Mackay; 1995–2015 | Succeeded by Julieanne Gilbert |
