= Jim Randell =

Australian politician (1928–2016)

Member of the Queensland Legislative Assembly for Mirani
- In office 29 November 1980 – 31 March 1994
- Preceded by: Tom Newbery
- Succeeded by: Ted Malone

Personal details
- Born: James Henry Randell; 13 August 1928 Mackay, Queensland, Australia
- Died: 21 June 2016 (aged 87)
- Party: National Party
- Occupation: Grazier, Sugarcane farmer

James Henry Randell (13 August 1928 – 21 June 2016) was an Australian politician.

== Politics ==
He was the National Party member for Mirani in the Queensland Legislative Assembly from 1980 to 1994. He served as the Minister for Local Government and Racing from 1987 to 1989 before briefly serving as Minister for Works and Housing during the brief administration of Premier Russell Cooper from 25 September 1989 to 7 December 1989.

He was a councillor on the Shire of Broadsound from 1976 to 1982 and was chairman of the council from 1979 to 1982.

Parliament of Queensland
Preceded by Tom Newbery	Member for Mirani; 1980–1994	Succeeded by Ted Malone
