= Ed Casey =

Australian politician

The Honourable Ed Casey

Leader of the Opposition in Queensland Leader of the Labor Party in Queensland Elections: 1980
- In office 28 November 1978 – 20 October 1982
- Deputy: Jack Houston (1978–1980); Bill D'Arcy (1980–1982)
- Preceded by: Tom Burns
- Succeeded by: Keith Wright

Minister for Primary Industries
- In office 7 December 1989 – 31 July 1995
- Premier: Wayne Goss
- Preceded by: Mark Stoneman
- Succeeded by: Bob Gibbs

Shadow Minister for Primary Industries
- In office 2 March 1988 – 7 December 1989
- Leader: Wayne Goss
- Preceded by: Keith De Lacy
- Succeeded by: Des Booth

Member of the Queensland Legislative Assembly for Mackay
- In office 17 May 1969 – 15 July 1995
- Preceded by: Fred Graham
- Succeeded by: Tim Mulherin

Personal details
- Born: Edmund Denis Casey; 2 January 1933 Mackay, Queensland, Australia
- Died: 1 May 2006 (aged 73) Mackay, Queensland, Australia
- Party: Labor (1969–1972; 1977–2006); Independent (1972–1977)
- Spouse: Laurette Norma Reeves
- Children: 6
- Education: Christian Brothers' College, Mackay
- Occupation: Bank Clerk; Carrier; Politician

Edmund Denis Casey (2 January 1933 – 1 May 2006), known as Ed, was best known as the leader of the Australian Labor Party in Queensland between 1978 and 1982. He also served as Primary Industries Minister in the government of Wayne Goss between 1989 and 1995. Casey was the member for Mackay in the Legislative Assembly of Queensland between 1969 and 1995.

== Early life and career ==
Of Irish Catholic background, Casey started his working life as a bank clerk before entering his family's construction business. He was active in local government, becoming deputy mayor of the City of Mackay. Shortly before the 1969 election, he won Labor Party preselection for the seat of Mackay in the state parliament. He lost preselection for the Labor Party in 1972, after opposing the then dominant, left-wing faction in Trades Hall. But he was re-elected twice without Labor Party endorsement, as an independent Labor candidate, for example running under the banner of 'The True Labor Party'.

== Political career ==
=== Leader of the Labor Party ===
Casey was readmitted to the Labor caucus in 1977. In November 1978 he became Labor leader, replacing Tom Burns who had resigned unexpectedly. He led Labor into the 1980 election but failed to achieve more than a small swing against the Coalition Government led by Joh Bjelke-Petersen, and as a result his own authority within the state ALP was diminished.

Casey made an offer to the Queensland Liberal Party after the 1980 election to form a bipartisan alliance, with the aim of opposing the electoral malapportionment from which Bjelke-Petersen benefited, and of putting in its place a system of one-vote-one-value. Relations between the Liberals and the National Party in the Coalition were poor, with the Liberal Party being disadvantaged (though less severely than the ALP) by the prevailing pro-National gerrymander. Casey renewed his offer in 1982 when relations within the Coalition were still bad, but the offer was again rebuffed, despite a Liberal Convention in June voting against the existing electoral system. The following October, Casey lost the ALP leadership to Keith Wright.

=== Minister ===
Despite no longer being party leader, Casey was re-elected comfortably in 1983. In 1986, however, in the midst of a massive National landslide, Casey's hold on the seat was seriously threatened for the first time; he was held to only 53 percent of the vote. Over the next few years, the popularity of the National Party declined; the Coalition with the Liberals had acrimoniously ended earlier in the decade. In late 1989, after the Fitzgerald Inquiry had uncovered serious problems with corruption in the Queensland police force, the ALP won its first Queensland election for 32 years.

Wayne Goss thus became the new Premier, and appointed Casey as Primary Industries Minister. In this role, Casey reformed the sugar industry, established agricultural academies, and set up a drought relief task force. But his health had declined, with diabetes having aggravated his long-standing weight problems, and in 1995 he resigned from both the ministry and the parliament. He died of a stroke on 1 May 2006.

Like most Queensland Labor politicians of his era, Casey spent most of his best years in opposition. However, he remained a very popular member of his seat of Mackay. At the last election which he contested (1992), he achieved the rare feat of winning every single voting booth in the constituency.

Parliament of Queensland
Preceded by Fred Graham	Member for Mackay; 1969–1995	Succeeded by Tim Mulherin
