= Julieanne Gilbert =

Australian politician

Julieanne Gilbert MP

Assistant Minister for Health and Regional Health Infrastructure of Queensland
- In office 12 November 2020 – 18 May 2023
- Premier: Annastacia Palaszczuk
- Preceded by: Nikki Boyd
- Succeeded by: Brittany Lauga

Assistant Minister for Treasury of Queensland
- In office 21 May 2017 – 12 November 2020
- Premier: Annastacia Palaszczuk
- Preceded by: Glenn Butcher

Assistant Minister for State Development of Queensland
- In office 12 December 2017 – 21 May 2020
- Premier: Annastacia Palaszczuk

Member of the Queensland Legislative Assembly for Mackay
- In office 31 January 2015 – 26 October 2024
- Preceded by: Tim Mulherin
- Succeeded by: Nigel Dalton

Personal details
- Born: 6 May 1962 (age 63) Mackay, Queensland
- Party: Labor
- Profession: Teacher and union official
- Website: www.julieannegilbertmp.com

Julieanne Claire Gilbert (born 6 May 1962) is an Australian former politician. She served as the Assistant Minister for Health and Regional Health Infrastructure of Queensland from 2020 until 2023. She was the Labor member for Mackay in the Queensland Legislative Assembly from 2015 until her retirement in 2024.

== See also ==
- Second Palaszczuk Ministry
- Third Palaszczuk Ministry

Parliament of Queensland
Preceded by Tim Mulherin	Member for Mackay; 2015–2024	Succeeded by Nigel Dalton
