= Jim Pearce (politician) =

Australian politician

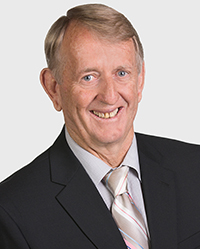
- Official portrait, c. 2015

Member of the Queensland Parliament for Mirani
- In office 31 January 2015 – 25 November 2017
- Preceded by: Ted Malone
- Succeeded by: Stephen Andrew

Member of the Queensland Parliament for Fitzroy Broadsound (1989–1992)
- In office 2 December 1989 – 20 March 2009
- Preceded by: Denis Hinton
- Succeeded by: Seat abolished

Personal details
- Born: 28 July 1948 (age 78) Paddington, New South Wales
- Party: Labor
- Children: 3
- Education: Narrabri High School
- Occupation: Coal miner

Military service
- Branch/service: Royal Australian Army Service Corps
- Years of service: 1969–1970
- Rank: Corporal
- Unit: 2 Transport Platoon RAASC

James Pearce (born 28 July 1948) is an Australian politician, born in the Sydney suburb of Paddington. He was a member of the Legislative Assembly of Queensland from 1989 to 2009. He returned to the Assembly in 2015 as the member for Mirani, but was defeated in 2017.

== Early life ==
Before entering politics, Pearce was a coal miner. He was also a Broadsound Shire councillor and served as a Corporal in the Vietnam War.

== Political career ==
First elected to state parliament at the 1989 state election as the member for Broadsound, Pearce represented the seat of Fitzroy from the 1992 state election onwards following the abolition of Broadsound. A backbencher throughout his 20 years in state politics, he was Secretary of the Parliamentary Labor Party from 1998 to 2001 and Chair of the Select Committee on Travel Safe from 2001 to 2008. During his last term of parliament, Pearce took several months leave to receive treatment for depression. He retired at the 2009 election.

After recovering from his illness, Pearce returned to politics, gaining pre-selection to contest the seat of Mirani at the 2012 election, although he failed to gain the seat.

Pearce was once again endorsed as the Labor Party candidate for the seat of Mirani in 2014, and at the 2015 election he won the seat with a 16.0% swing against the LNP.

After the election he became the Chair of the Infrastructure, Planning and Natural Resources Committee.

At the 2017 election he was defeated by One Nation's Stephen Andrew with a 8.6% swing against him.

== Personal life ==
He has three sons.

Parliament of Queensland
Preceded by Denis Hinton	Member for Broadsound; 1989–1992	Abolished
New seat	Member for Fitzroy; 1992–2009	Abolished
Preceded by Ted Malone	Member for Mirani; 2015–2017	Succeeded by Stephen Andrew
