= Tom Newbery =

Australian politician (1914–1984)

The Honourable Tom Newbery

Member of the Queensland Legislative Assembly for Mirani
- In office 15 May 1965 – 29 November 1980
- Preceded by: Ernie Evans
- Succeeded by: Jim Randell

Personal details
- Born: Thomas Guy Newbery; 23 March 1914 Mackay, Queensland, Australia
- Died: 30 October 1984 (aged 70) Sarina, Queensland, Australia
- Party: Country Party/National Party
- Spouse: Jessie Lambert (m.1939)
- Occupation: Sugarcane farmer

Thomas Guy Newbery (23 March 1914 – 30 October 1984) was a member of the Queensland Legislative Assembly.

== Biography ==
Newbery was born at Mackay, Queensland, the son of Ernest Newbery and his wife Maude (née Nicholson). He was educated at West Plane Creek, Laburnum Grove, Langdons Creek and Sarina State Schools, and All Souls' School, Charters Towers. After finishing his education, he became a sugarcane farmer.

On 1 March 1939, he married Jessie Lambert and together they had a son and two daughters. Newbery died in October 1984 and was accorded a state funeral, which was held at the St Luke's Anglican Church, Sarina.

== Public career ==
Newbery was a long-term member of the Sarina Shire Council, serving for over 28 years. He was deputy chairman of the shire from 1955 until 1964, and chairman from 1964 until 1974.

When the member for Mirani, Ernie Evans, died in 1965, Newbery won the subsequent by-election for the Country Party. He went on to represent the electorate for fifteen years, retiring at the 1980 Queensland state election.

During his time in the Queensland Parliament, he held several portfolios and other positions:

- Member of the parliamentary delegation to Japan and South-East Asia 1972
- Minister for Tourism and for Education and Cultural Activities 1974–1975
- Minister for Tourism and Marine Services 1975–1976
- Minister for Police 1976–1977
- Minister for Culture, National Parks and Recreation 1977–1979
- Leader of the House 1976–1979

Newbery was Minister for Police in 1976, at the time of the promotion of the corrupt police officer Terry Lewis to the post of Assistant Commissioner, over 122 equal or more senior officers. Upon being told that Lewis was to be appointed as his deputy, the then Police Commissioner Ray Whitrod reportedly told Newbery that the appointment was "shattering", that it was widely known that Lewis had been one of Frank Bischof's bagmen, and that "everybody in the police force knows that Lewis is corrupt", to which Newbery replied, "Well that was when he was a detective sergeant — he is now an inspector and wouldn't do that sort of thing". Newbery claimed that the decision had been made by Premier Joh Bjelke-Petersen. Lewis's appointment led Whitrod to resign, with Lewis being appointed Police Commissioner in his stead. Following the revelations of the 1987–1989 Fitzgerald Inquiry, Lewis resigned in disgrace and was imprisoned for corruption.

Parliament of Queensland
Preceded by Ernie Evans	Member for Mirani; 1965–1980	Succeeded by Jim Randell
