= Maurice Black (Australian politician) =

Australian politician

Maurice Black JP
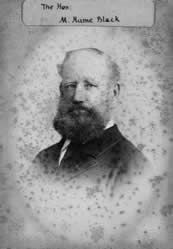

Member of the Queensland Legislative Assembly for Mackay
- In office 24 March 1881 – 29 April 1893 Serving with David Dalrymple
- Preceded by: Francis Amhurst
- Succeeded by: James Chataway

Personal details
- Born: Maurice Hume Black; 15 December 1835 London, England
- Died: 16 August 1899 (aged 63) Coolgardie, Western Australia, Australia
- Resting place: Coolgardie Cemetery
- Spouse: Maria Frederica Davies (m.1861 d.1906)
- Occupation: Gold miner, Farmer, Attorney

Maurice Hume Black (15 December 1835 – 16 August 1899) was an Australian politician, member of the Queensland Legislative Assembly.

Black was a grand-nephew of the celebrated Joseph Hume, Member for Montrose in the British House of Commons. He was born in London, England and in 1861 married Maria Frederica Davies, a niece of the great statesman, George Canning.

Having emigrated to Victoria (Australia) in 1852, Black left the goldfields of that colony to try his luck in pastoral pursuits in South Australia, subsequently going to the Riverina, and in 1864 to Queensland. Black was the inventor of a steam sheep-washing process, and went into sugar planting in the Mackay district of Queensland in 1871.

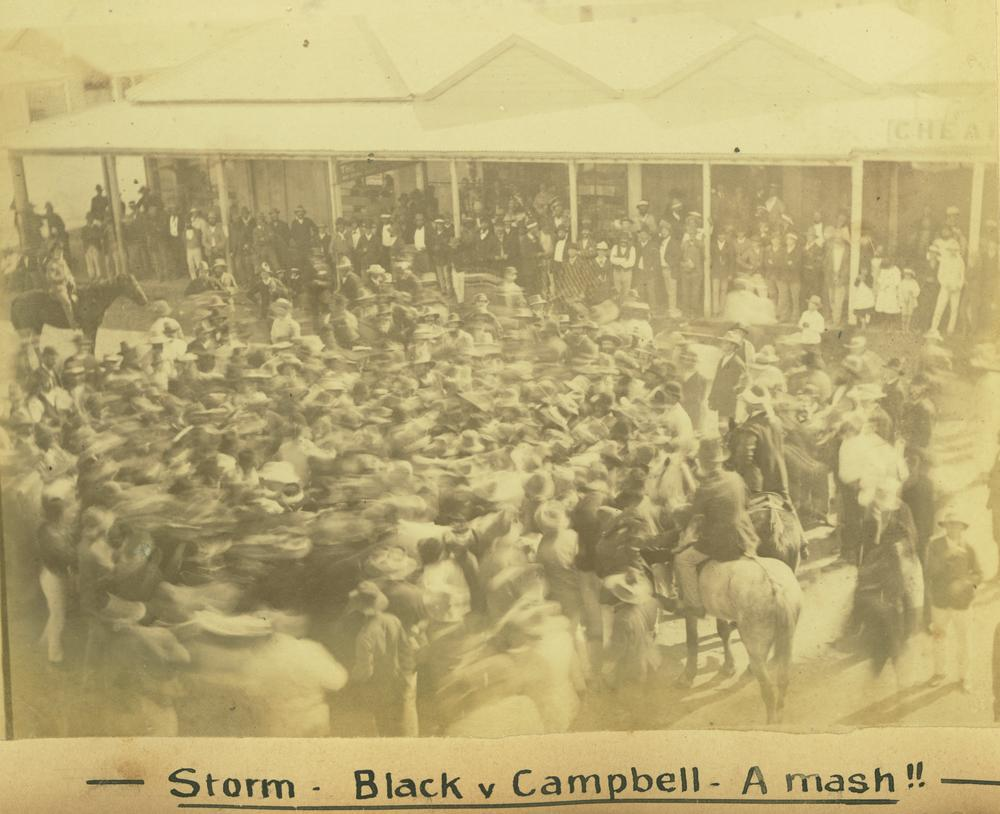
Brawls during the elections at Mackay in 1883. The political contestants were Maurice Hume Black and Thomas Campbell.

In 1881 Black was elected to the Legislative Assembly for the seat of Mackay. Having taken a prominent part in the agitation for the separation of Northern Queensland from the rest of the colony, and its formation into a distinct colony, he was in 1887 commissioned to go to England with Mr. Lissner to press the matter upon the attention of the Home Government, Harold Finch-Hatton and Dr. Ahearne having done much to bring the matter into the region of practical politics by their exertions during the previous year. Though not successful in inducing Lord Knutsford to take steps for the separation of Northern Queensland, the advanced phase which the question has since assumed is a good deal due to the efforts of the delegation of 1887. In June 1888, on the formation of the second Thomas McIlwraith Administration, Black became Secretary of Public Works, and continued to hold the post when five months later the Ministry was reconstructed under Boyd Dunlop Morehead. Black resigned with his colleagues in August 1890.

Black left Parliament in April 1893 and worked as an immigration agent in the agent-general's office in London; this post was abolished in 1894. Then Black decided to try his luck on the Coolgardie, Western Australia goldfields with some of his family; he arrived in 1896 and set up as an attorney for mining companies.

Black died in Coolgardie on 16 August 1899 of cirrhosis of the liver and cardiac failure and was buried in the Coolgardie Cemetery. His wife returned to Queensland and died on 18 February 1906 at her home Roseville, Regent Street, South Brisbane and was buried in the South Brisbane Cemetery on 19 February 1906.

== Legacy ==
Blacks Beach, one of the northern beach suburbs of Mackay in Queensland, is named after him. Black had originally lived on his sugar plantation (The Cedars) but later moved to the coast.

== Works ==
- A few facts in connection with the Employment of Polynesian Labour in Queensland: 1894, London: Colony of Queensland, 1894, Wikidata Q108799620

Parliament of Queensland
Preceded by Francis Amhurst	Member for Mackay; 1881–1893; Served alongside: David Dalrymple	Succeeded by James Chataway
