= Stephen Andrew =

Australian politician (born 1968)

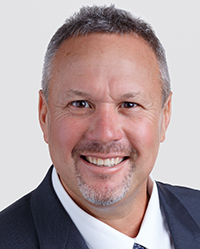
- Andrew, c. 2017

Member of the Queensland Legislative Assembly for Mirani
- In office 25 November 2017 – 30 October 2024
- Preceded by: Jim Pearce
- Succeeded by: Glen Kelly

Personal details
- Born: Stephen Seymour James Andrew; 9 December 1968 (age 57) Mackay, Queensland, Australia
- Party: Trumpet of Patriots (since 2025); Katter's Australian (2024–2025); Independent (2024); One Nation (until 2024)
- Children: 2

Stephen Seymour James Andrew (born 9 December 1968) is an Australian politician who served as the member for Mirani in the Queensland Legislative Assembly from 2017 to 2024 when he was defeated by Glen Kelly at the 2024 Queensland state election.

Andrew describes himself as a "fourth-generation South Sea Islander", and is the first South Sea Islander to be elected to parliament. His great-great-grandmother Lucy Querro of Ambae Island (now part of Vanuatu) was one of the Pacific Islander workers who came to Queensland to work in either the sugarcane fields or domestic service; Andrew claims she was "blackbirded". In July 2019 Andrew became a Vanuatu tribal chieftain, Chief Moli Duru Ambrae, following ceremonies held on Ambae Island. He was bestowed the chiefly name Moli Duru Ambae.

Before entering parliament he worked as a firearms dealer and pest controller. Andrew was the sole One Nation MP in the Queensland Parliament, but was not the state leader of the party. Ousted MP Steve Dickson held the position until his resignation.

On 2 August 2024, Andrew was disendorsed by One Nation for the 2024 Queensland state election after he considered joining Katter's Australian Party (KAP). Following the disendorsment, Andrew resigned from One Nation and briefly sat as an independent before joining the Katter's Australian Party in September 2024.

== Electoral History ==
Queensland Legislative Assembly
Election year	Electorate	Party	Votes	FP%	+/-	2PP%	+/-	Result
2017	Mirani	ONP	9,234	32.0	▲32.0	54.8	▲54.80	First
2020	Mirani	ONP	9,320	31.66	▼0.38	58.98	▲4.16	First
2024	Mirani	KAP	8,017	25.02	▲25.02	49.03	N/A	Second

Australian House of Representatives
Election year	Electorate	Party	Votes	FP%	+/-	2PP%	+/-	Result
2025	Capricornia	TOP	5,999	6.08	▲6.08	N/A	N/A	Fifth

Parliament of Queensland
Preceded by Jim Pearce	Member for Mirani; 2017–present	Incumbent
