= Electoral district of Mirani =

State electoral district of Queensland, Australia

Mirani Queensland—Legislative Assembly
- Electoral map of Mirani 2017
- State: Queensland
- MP: Glen Kelly
- Party: Liberal National
- Namesake: Mirani
- Electors: 34,141 (2020)
- Area: 63,290 km^{2} (24,436.4 sq mi)
- Demographic: Provincial and rural
- Coordinates: 22°21′S 149°13′E
Electorates around Mirani:
Burdekin	Whitsunday	Mackay
Burdekin	Mirani	Coral Sea
Gregory	Callide	Keppel; Gladstone

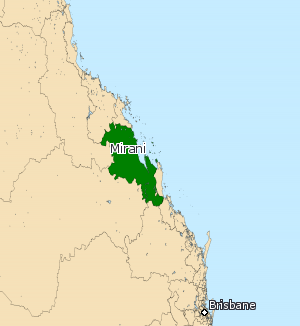
Electoral map of Mirani 2008

Mirani is an electoral district of the Legislative Assembly in the Australian state of Queensland. It is currently represented by Glen Kelly of the Liberal National Party.

It covers much of the Queensland coast between the cities of Rockhampton and Mackay, as well as the hinterland west of Mackay. Major towns within its boundaries include Sarina, Marian, Mount Morgan, and its namesake, Mirani. It also contains the outer Mackay suburbs of Bakers Creek, Ooralea, and parts of Paget.

Mirani was historically a safely conservative seat, and was held by the Country Party and its successors the National Party and Liberal National Party from 1947 to 2015. A redistribution in 2008 made Mirani a notionally Labor held seat with a 1.2% margin, but veteran incumbent Ted Malone achieved a swing strong enough to retain this seat at the 2009 election. Malone retired at the 2015 state election, at which Jim Pearce, formerly Labor member for abolished Fitzroy from 1989 to 2009, became only the second Labor member ever to win Mirani.

Pearce was subsequently defeated at the 2017 election by Stephen Andrew, of Pauline Hanson's One Nation. Andrew was disendorsed by One Nation ahead of the 2024 election and later left the party, choosing to sit as an independent before joining the Katter's Australian Party in September 2024. He narrowly lost re-election to Glen Kelly of the Liberal National Party at the 2024 state election.

== Members for Mirani ==
Member	Party	Term
Edward Swayne	Liberal	1912–1918
Edward Swayne	National	1918–1920
Edward Swayne	Northern Country	1920–1923
Edward Swayne	Country	1923–1925
Edward Swayne	CPNP	1925–1935
Ted Walsh	Labor	1935–1947
Ernie Evans	Country	1947–1965
Tom Newbery	Country	1965–1974
Tom Newbery	National	1974–1980
Jim Randell	National	1980–1994
Ted Malone	National	1994–2008
Ted Malone	Liberal National	2008–2015
Jim Pearce	Labor	2015–2017
Stephen Andrew	One Nation	2017–2024
Stephen Andrew	Independent	2024
Stephen Andrew	Katter's Australian	2024
Glen Kelly	Liberal National	2024–present

== Election results ==
2024 Queensland state election: Mirani
Party	Candidate	Votes	%	±%
Liberal National	Glen Kelly	11,750	36.7	+9.1
Katter's Australian	Stephen Andrew	8,017	25.0	+25.0
Labor	Susan Teder	6,521	20.3	−11.6
One Nation	Brett Neal	3,804	11.9	−19.8
Greens	Maria Carty	1,043	3.3	+0.8
Family First	Patricia Martin	911	2.8	+2.8
Total formal votes		32,046	95.7	
Informal votes		1,429	4.3	
Turnout		33,475		
Two-candidate-preferred result
Liberal National	Glen Kelly	16,333	51.0	+9.9
Katter's Australian	Stephen Andrew	15,713	49.0	−9.9
Liberal National gain from Katter's Australian		Swing	+9.9	
