= Ernie Evans =

Australian politician

The Honourable Ernie Evans
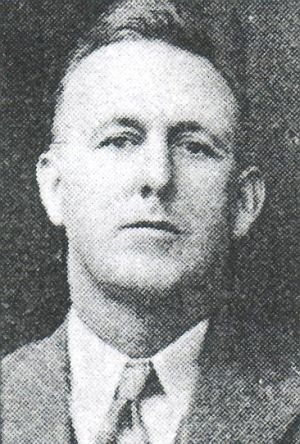

Member of the Queensland Legislative Assembly for Mirani
- In office 3 May 1947 – 28 February 1965
- Preceded by: Ted Walsh
- Succeeded by: Tom Newbery

Personal details
- Born: Ernest Evans; 6 March 1892 Killarney, Queensland, Australia
- Died: 28 February 1965 (aged 72) Brisbane, Queensland, Australia
- Resting place: Mount Bassett Cemetery, Mackay
- Party: Country Party
- Spouse: Winifred Ellen Cronin (m. 1914 d.1974)
- Occupation: Bush worker

Ernest "Ernie" Evans (6 March 1892 – 28 February 1965) was a member of the Queensland Legislative Assembly.

== Biography ==
Evans was born in Killarney, Queensland, the son of Joseph Evans and his wife Harriet (née Murphy). He was educated at Spring Creek Killarney State Schools and after finishing his education worked as a shearer and timber cutter. In 1920 he went partners in a sugar cane farm at Little Mulgrave. Having trouble transporting the cane, he organised the local farmers into forming a company to build a train line to the Mulgrave sugar mill. In 1929 he moved to the Mackay district and bought another cane farm and became heavily associated with the Australian Sugar Producers Association. From 1935 to 1957 he was a director of the Farleigh Cooperative Sugar Association.

On 31 October 1914 he married Winifred Ellen Cronin (died 1974) at Christ Church in Bundaberg and together had three sons and a daughter. Evans died after complications with what was thought to be a minor operation in Brisbane in February 1965. He was accorded a state funeral in Mackay and buried in the Mount Bassett Cemetery.

== Public career ==
During his days working in the bush, he was a member of the Australian Workers' Union with whom he earned the nickname Firestrick Ernie and went on to be an organiser for the union. Evans was a councilor in the Pioneer Shire from 1929 to 1934 and was the shire's chairman on two separate occasions, from 1934 to 1947 and 1955 to 1957.

He decided to enter state politics as a candidate for the Country Party at the 1947 Queensland state election in the seat of Mirani. His opponent for the Labor Party was the Deputy Premier and Minister for Transport, Ted Walsh. In what proved to be a bitterly contested election, Evans defeated Walsh convincingly.

Evans went on to represent the electorate until his death eighteen years later, turning it into a safe Country Party seat. When the Country Party came to power in 1957, Evans was immediately elevated to the Ministry, first as Minister for Development, Mines and Main Roads from 1957 until 1960 and then Minister for Development, Mines, Main Roads and Electricity from 1960 until his death.

Parliament of Queensland
Preceded by Ted Walsh	Member for Mirani; 1947–1965	Succeeded by Tom Newbery
