= Edward Swayne =

Australian politician (1857–1946)

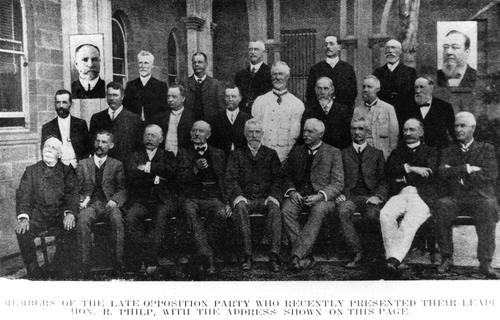
- Members of the opposition party Queensland Parliament 1909 – Swayne is on the left, middle row.

Member of the Queensland Legislative Assembly for Mackay
- In office 18 May 1907 – 27 April 1912 Serving with Walter Paget
- Preceded by: Albert Fudge
- Succeeded by: Walter Paget

Member of the Queensland Legislative Assembly for Mirani
- In office 27 April 1912 – 11 May 1935
- Preceded by: New seat
- Succeeded by: Ted Walsh

Personal details
- Born: Edward Bowdich Swayne; 4 December 1857 Erith, Kent, England
- Died: 15 June 1946 (aged 88) Brisbane, Queensland, Australia
- Party: Country and Progressive National Party
- Other political affiliations: Opposition, Ministerial, Liberal, National, Northern Country Party, Country Party
- Spouse(s): Margaret Ellen Thompson, Olive Lilian Kay
- Occupation: Farmer

Edward Bowdich Swayne (4 December 1857 – 15 June 1946) was a member of the Queensland Legislative Assembly.

== Biography ==
Swayne was born in Erith, Kent, the son of Herbert Wigan Swayne (1819–1891) and his wife Eugenia Keir (née Bowdich) (1823–1875). When he arrived in Queensland he took up farming.

He was married twice, first to Margaret Ellen Thompson (1867–1915) whom he married in Mackay, and then he married Olive Lilian Kay (1890–1960) in Brisbane. He died in Brisbane in June 1946 and was cremated at the Mount Thompson Crematorium.

Edward had five children from his first marriage John Bowdich Swayne (1894–1971), Ellen Eugenia Swayne (1895–1964), Florence May Swayne (1897–1946), Edward Vincent Hay Swayne (1899–1970) and Wallis Eric Swayne (1905–1994).

== Public career ==
Swayne represented several political parties during his time in parliament including the Opposition Party, the Ministerialists, Liberal, National, the Northern Country Party, the Country Party, and the Country and Progressive National Party. He started in politics as a councilor in the Pioneer Shire Council.

He won the seat of Mackay in the Queensland Legislative Assembly, representing the electorate with Walter Paget at the 1907 Queensland state election. He held Mackay until the 1912 election when it became a one-seat constituency and he then was elected to the new seat of Mirani. He remained the member for that seat until 11 May 1935 when he retired from politics.

== Street name ==
A number of street names in the Brisbane suburb of Carina Heights are identical to the surnames of former Members of the Queensland Legislative Assembly. One of these is Swayne Street.

Parliament of Queensland
Preceded by Albert Fudge	Member for Mackay; 1907–1912; Served alongside: Walter Paget	Succeeded by Walter Paget
New seat	Member for Mirani; 1912–1935	Succeeded by Ted Walsh
