= Candidates of the 1974 Queensland state election =

The 1974 Queensland state election was held on 7 December 1974.

== Retiring members ==
- Note: Cooroora National MLA David Low and Flinders National MLA Bill Longeran resigned shortly before the election; no by-elections were held.

=== Labor ===
- Pat Hanlon MLA (Baroona)
- Alec Inch MLA (Mount Isa)
- Eugene O'Donnell MLA (Belyando)
- Doug Sherrington MLA (Salisbury)
- Edwin Wallis-Smith MLA (Cook)

=== National ===
- Sir Alan Fletcher MLA (Cunningham)
- Henry McKechnie MLA (Carnarvon)
- Wally Rae MLA (Gregory)

=== Liberal ===
- Clive Hughes MLA (Kurilpa)
- Douglas Tooth MLA (Ashgrove)

== Candidates ==
Sitting members at the time of the election are shown in bold text.

Electorate	Held by	Labor candidate	Coalition candidate	DLP candidate	Other candidates
Albert	Labor	**Bill D'Arcy**	Keith Brough (Lib); Ivan Gibbs* (Nat)	Harold Trigger	John Black (Ind)
Archerfield	Labor	**Kevin Hooper**	Garry Hansen (Lib)	Barry Weedon	Ivan Ivanoff (SPA)
Ashgrove	Liberal	John Rees	Hilda Brooks (Nat); John Greenwood* (Lib)	John Fox	
Aspley	Liberal	John Steensen	**Fred Campbell** (Lib)		
Auburn	National	Roden Carter	**Nev Hewitt** (Nat)		
Balonne	National	Robert Drenan	**Don Neal** (Nat)		
Barambah	National	Donald Gordon-Brown	**Joh Bjelke-Petersen** (Nat)		
Baroona	Labor	John Camp	Dennis Young (Lib)	Denis Cochran	
Barron River	Labor	**Bill Wood**	Martin Tenni (Nat)	Douglas McClarty	John Lamb (AP)
Belmont	Labor	**Fred Newton**	David Byrne (Lib)		
Belyando	Labor	James Turner	Fred Cowdray (Lib); Vince Lester* (Nat)		
Brisbane	Labor	**Brian Davis**	Harold Lowes (Lib)	Viliam Simek	
Bulimba	Labor	**Jack Houston**	Megan Wilding (Lib)		
Bundaberg	Labor	**Lou Jensen**	David Jenkin (Nat); Keith Powell (Lib)	Alan Birchley	
Burdekin	National	Clyde Ferris	**Val Bird** (Nat)	Emil Liebrecht	
Burnett	National	Ken Green	**Claude Wharton** (Nat)		
Cairns	Labor	**Ray Jones**	Robert Duncan (Nat)		Robert Ellwood (AP); William Whelan (Ind)
Callide	National	Mabel Edmund; Wilfred Mutton	**Lindsay Hartwig** (Nat)	Lindsay Sharpe	
Carnarvon	National	John Saunders	Peter McKechnie* (Nat); Fred Rogers (Lib)	Raymond Macnamara	
Chatsworth	Liberal	Terry Mackenroth	**Bill Hewitt** (Lib)	Mary Scragg	
Clayfield	Liberal	John Stephens	**John Murray** (Lib)	Francis Andrews	
Condamine	National	Gladys Krause	**Vic Sullivan** (Nat)		James Drabsch (Ind)
Cook	Labor	Bob Scott	Eric Deeral* (Nat); Keith Hollands (Lib); Terrence Mahoney (Nat)		Graham Gordon (Ind); Patrick O'Shane (AAP); Percy Trezise (Ind)
Cooroora	National	Anthony Dames	Gordon Simpson* (Nat); Henry Williams (Lib)	Alexander Browne	
Cunningham	National	Ronald Whittington	Patrick Coonan (Lib); Tony Elliott* (Nat)	Robert Barron	
Everton	Labor	**Gerry Jones**	Brian Lindsay (Lib)	James Doherty	Theoron Toon (Ind)
Fassifern	National	Clifford Cherry	**Selwyn Muller** (Nat)		
Flinders	National	Albert Sorohan	Bob Katter* (Nat); James McGucken (Lib)		
Greenslopes	Liberal	Joseph Sciacca	**Keith Hooper** (Lib)	Harry Wright	
Gregory	National	Gordon Harding	Bill Glasson (Nat)		
Gympie	National	N Box	**Max Hodges** (Nat)		
Hinchinbrook	National	Desley Clinton	**Ted Row** (Nat)	John Williams	Evelyn Scott (AAP)
Ipswich	Liberal	John Kinnane	**Llewellyn Edwards** (Lib)	Francis Carroll	Gregory Welsby (SPA)
Ipswich West	Labor	**Vi Jordan**	Albert Hales* (Nat); Ronda Herrmann (Lib)	John Dredge	
Isis	Labor	**Jim Blake**	Lin Powell* (Nat); Barry Wright (Nat)		
Ithaca	Liberal	Robert Coutts	**Col Miller** (Lib)		
Kurilpa	Liberal	Frank Gardiner	Col Bennett (Nat); Brendan Clark-Coolee (Nat); Sam Doumany* (Lib)	Damien White	
Landsborough	National	Ivan Guy	**Mike Ahern** (Nat)		Paul Cowan (Ind)
Lockyer	Liberal	Lindesay Jones	**Sir Gordon Chalk** (Lib)		Kenneth Hooper (Ind)
Lytton	Labor	**Tom Burns**	John Ivers (Lib)		
Mackay	Independent	John Hill	Lionel Bevis (Nat)		**Ed Casey** (Ind)
Mansfield	Liberal	Desmond Rowland	**Bill Kaus** (Lib)	Lionel Lane	
Maryborough	Liberal	John Anderson	**Gilbert Alison** (Lib)	Matthews Minnegal	
Merthyr	Liberal	Terence Dawson	**Don Lane** (Lib)		
Mirani	National	Leslie Dwyer	**Tom Newbery** (Nat)		
Mount Coot-tha	Liberal	Ian De Lacy	**Bill Lickiss** (Lib)	Ross Domrow	
Mount Gravatt	Liberal	Bill Avery	**Geoff Chinchen** (Lib)	Therese Sheil	
Mount Isa	Labor	John Shepherd	Angelo Bertoni* (Nat); Kevin Coughlan (Lib)		
Mourilyan	Labor	**Peter Moore**	Vicky Kippin (Nat)	Salvatore Nucifora	
Mulgrave	National	Louie Tognola	**Roy Armstrong** (Nat)		
Murrumba	National	Neville Lines	**Des Frawley** (Nat)		
Nudgee	Labor	**Jack Melloy**	Denis Simonyi (Lib)		
Nundah	Liberal	Leonard Hingley	**William Knox** (Lib)		
Pine Rivers	Labor	**Ken Leese**	Rob Akers* (Lib); Donald Hawkins (Nat)		
Port Curtis	Labor	**Martin Hanson**	Douglas Cuddy (Lib); Francis Waterson (Nat)		
Redcliffe	National	Jack Trueman	**Jim Houghton** (Nat)	Paul Maguire	George Wise (Ind)
Redlands	Labor	**Ted Baldwin**	Brian Dee (Lib); John Goleby* (Nat)	Peter McMahon	
Rockhampton	Labor	**Keith Wright**	Alan Agnew (Lib); Michael Bleines (Nat)	Robert Bom	
Rockhampton North	Labor	**Les Yewdale**	T R Young (Lib)	John Dunn	
Roma	National	Ben Ward	**Ken Tomkins** (Nat)		
Salisbury	Labor	Bill Wilcox	Rosemary Kyburz* (Lib); Leonard Spies (Nat)	Miroslav Jansky	
Sandgate	Labor	**Harry Dean**	Malcolm Thompson (Lib)		
Sherwood	Liberal	Kerry Keating	**John Herbert** (Lib)	Clarice Weedon	
Somerset	National	Gordon Abbott	**Bill Gunn** (Nat)		Keith Hughes (Ind)
South Brisbane	Labor	**Fred Bromley**	Colin Lamont (Lib)		
South Coast	National	Marion Reid	**Russ Hinze** (Nat)		
Stafford	Labor	**Roy Harvey**	Terry Gygar (Lib)	Edward Doherty	Laurence Gormley (Ind)
Surfers Paradise	National	Maurice Marsden	**Bruce Small** (Nat)	John Perrett	John Duncan (Ind)
Toowong	Liberal	Donald Dignam	**Charles Porter** (Lib)	Brian O'Brien	
Toowoomba North	Labor	**Ray Bousen**	John Lockwood (Lib)		
Toowoomba South	Labor	**Peter Wood**	John Warner* (Nat); Leslie Whykes (Lib)	Mary Ryan	
Townsville	Liberal	Richard Lindsay	**Norman Scott-Young** (Lib)	Brian Hurney	Betty Malkin (AP)
Townsville South	Independent	Alex Wilson		John Judge	**Tom Aikens*** (Ind); Leonard Weber (AP)
Townsville West	Labor	**Perc Tucker**	Max Hooper* (Nat); Bryan Newell (Nat); Keith Rundle (Lib)	Kiernan Dorney	
Warrego	Labor	**Jack Aiken**	Neil Turner (Nat)		
Warwick	National	Raymond Lyons	**David Cory** (Nat)		
Wavell	Liberal	Jack Geran	**Arthur Crawford** (Lib)	Mervyn Eunson	
Whitsunday	National	Stanley Yardley	**Ron Camm** (Nat)		
Windsor	Liberal	Gloria Markland	**Bob Moore** (Lib)	Anne Wenck	Mervyn Chambers (Ind)
Wolston	Labor	**Evan Marginson**	Dirk Plooy (Lib)	Leonard Maguire	Albert Blaine (Ind)
Wynnum	Labor	**Ted Harris**	Bill Lamond* (Nat); William Vaughan (Lib)	Gordon Randall	
Yeronga	Liberal	Spencer Higgins	**Norm Lee** (Lib)	Andrew Jackson	

== See also ==
- 1974 Queensland state election
- Members of the Queensland Legislative Assembly, 1972–1974
- Members of the Queensland Legislative Assembly, 1974–1977
- List of political parties in Australia
