= Results of the 1974 Queensland state election =

Queensland state election, 7 December 1974 Legislative Assembly << 1972–1977 >>
Enrolled voters	1,186,378				
Votes cast	1,060,910		Turnout	89.42%	–2.99%
Informal votes	16,742		Informal	1.58%	+0.05%
Summary of votes by party
Party	Primary votes	%	Swing	Seats	Change
Labor	376,187	36.03%	–10.72%	11	–22
Liberal	324,682	31.09%	+8.87%	30	+9
National	291,088	27.88%	+7.88%	39	+13
Independent	30,330	2.90%	–0.42%	2	±0
Queensland Labor	19,952	1.91%	–5.78%	0	±0
Other	1,929	0.18%	+0.18%	0	±0
Total	1,044,168			82	

This is a list of electoral district results for the 1974 Queensland state election.

== Results by electoral district ==
=== Albert ===
1974 Queensland state election: Albert
Party	Candidate	Votes	%	±%
National	Ivan Gibbs	6,622	36.6	+7.8
Labor	Bill D'Arcy	6,599	36.5	−14.0
Liberal	Keith Brough	4,543	25.1	+8.9
Independent	John Black	174	1.0	−0.1
Queensland Labor	Harold Trigger	130	0.7	−2.0
Total formal votes		18,068	97.2	−0.5
Informal votes		526	2.8	+0.5
Turnout		18,594	87.1	−2.6
Two-party-preferred result
National	Ivan Gibbs	10,867	60.1	+14.2
Labor	Bill D'Arcy	7,201	39.9	−14.2
National gain from Labor		Swing	+14.2	

=== Archerfield ===
1974 Queensland state election: Archerfield
Party	Candidate	Votes	%	±%
Labor	Kevin Hooper	6,657	53.5	−18.3
Liberal	Garry Hansen	5,260	42.3	+22.9
Queensland Labor	Barry Weedon	371	3.0	−5.8
Socialist	Ivan Ivanoff	157	1.3	+1.3
Total formal votes		12,445	97.3	−0.1
Informal votes		344	2.7	+0.1
Turnout		12,789	87.5	−4.7
Two-party-preferred result
Labor	Kevin Hooper	6,846	55.0	−18.3
Liberal	Garry Hansen	5,599	45.0	+18.3
Labor hold		Swing	−18.3	

=== Ashgrove ===
1974 Queensland state election: Ashgrove
Party	Candidate	Votes	%	±%
Liberal	John Greenwood	5,772	44.1	+13.8
Labor	John Rees	4,040	30.9	−8.6
National	Hilda Brooks	2,757	21.1	+21.1
Queensland Labor	John Fox	515	3.9	−4.9
Total formal votes		13,084	98.8	−0.2
Informal votes		162	1.2	+0.2
Turnout		13,246	90.3	
Two-party-preferred result
Liberal	John Greenwood	8,962	68.5	+13.7
Labor	John Rees	4,122	31.5	−13.7
Liberal hold		Swing	+13.7	

=== Aspley ===
1974 Queensland state election: Aspley
Party	Candidate	Votes	%	±%
Liberal	Fred Campbell	10,307	73.1	+21.8
Labor	John Steensen	3,786	26.9	−13.4
Total formal votes		14,093	98.9	−0.1
Informal votes		156	1.1	+0.1
Turnout		14,249	91.0	−3.2
Liberal hold		Swing	+14.8	

=== Auburn ===
1974 Queensland state election: Auburn
Party	Candidate	Votes	%	±%
National	Neville Hewitt	7,164	77.9	+26.6
Labor	Roden Carter	2,026	22.1	−13.0
Total formal votes		9,190	99.1	+0.2
Informal votes		83	0.9	−0.2
Turnout		9,273	91.5	−1.6
National hold		Swing	+14.5	

=== Balonne ===
1974 Queensland state election: Balonne
Party	Candidate	Votes	%	±%
National	Don Neal	4,664	75.4	+24.1
Labor	Robert Drenan	1,523	24.6	−4.3
Total formal votes		6,187	99.0	−0.1
Informal votes		63	1.0	+0.1
Turnout		6,250	87.4	−2.4
National hold		Swing	+9.8	

=== Barambah ===
1974 Queensland state election: Barambah
Party	Candidate	Votes	%	±%
National	Joh Bjelke-Petersen	8,335	83.4	+16.0
Labor	Donald Gordon-Brown	1,663	16.6	−7.2
Total formal votes		9,998	99.0	0.0
Informal votes		101	1.0	0.0
Turnout		10,099	93.2	−2.5
National hold		Swing	+9.7	

=== Baroona ===
1974 Queensland state election: Baroona
Party	Candidate	Votes	%	±%
Liberal	Dennis Young	5,643	48.4	+20.4
Labor	John Camp	5,528	47.4	−15.2
Queensland Labor	Denis Cochran	484	4.1	−5.3
Total formal votes		11,655	97.6	+0.3
Informal votes		280	2.4	−0.3
Turnout		11,935	84.7	−5.8
Two-party-preferred result
Liberal	Dennis Young	6,022	51.7	+15.8
Labor	John Camp	5,633	48.3	−15.8
Liberal gain from Labor		Swing	+15.8	

=== Barron River ===
1974 Queensland state election: Barron River
Party	Candidate	Votes	%	±%
Labor	Bill Wood	7,075	47.7	−4.6
National	Martin Tenni	7,010	47.2	+6.5
Queensland Labor	Douglas McClarty	458	3.1	−0.3
Australia	John Lamb	302	2.0	+2.0
Total formal votes		14,845	98.5	0.0
Informal votes		229	1.5	0.0
Turnout		15,074	86.8	−4.5
Two-party-preferred result
National	Martin Tenni	7,531	50.7	+4.1
Labor	Bill Wood	7,314	49.3	−4.1
National gain from Labor		Swing	+4.1	

=== Belmont ===
1974 Queensland state election: Belmont
Party	Candidate	Votes	%	±%
Liberal	David Byrne	6,974	53.6	+25.5
Labor	Fred Newton	6,044	46.4	−17.5
Total formal votes		13,018	98.6	+0.1
Informal votes		183	1.4	−0.1
Turnout		13,201	90.7	−3.7
Liberal gain from Labor		Swing	+18.5	

=== Belyando ===
1974 Queensland state election: Belyando
Party	Candidate	Votes	%	±%
National	Vince Lester	5,379	50.2	+1.5
Labor	James Turner	4,436	41.4	−9.9
Liberal	Fred Cowdray	900	8.4	+8.4
Total formal votes		10,715	98.5	−0.1
Informal votes		165	1.5	+0.1
Turnout		10,880	87.8	−1.9
Two-party-preferred result
National	Vince Lester	6,153	57.4	+8.7
Labor	James Turner	4,562	42.6	−8.7
National gain from Labor		Swing	+8.7	

=== Brisbane ===
1974 Queensland state election: Brisbane
Party	Candidate	Votes	%	±%
Labor	Brian Davis	4,523	48.3	−6.7
Liberal	Harold Lowes	4,454	47.6	+19.3
Queensland Labor	Viliam Simek	387	4.1	−7.0
Total formal votes		9,364	97.5	+0.9
Informal votes		243	2.5	−0.9
Turnout		9,607	82.8	−7.4
Two-party-preferred result
Liberal	Harold Lowes	4,796	51.2	+10.9
Labor	Brian Davis	4,568	48.8	−10.9
Liberal gain from Labor		Swing	+10.9	

=== Bulimba ===
1974 Queensland state election: Bulimba
Party	Candidate	Votes	%	±%
Labor	Jack Houston	6,199	51.7	−12.3
Liberal	Megan Wilding	5,785	48.3	+21.7
Total formal votes		11,984	98.4	−0.2
Informal votes		199	1.6	+0.2
Turnout		12,183	88.5	−5.6
Labor hold		Swing	−13.9	

=== Bundaberg ===
1974 Queensland state election: Bundaberg
Party	Candidate	Votes	%	±%
Labor	Lou Jensen	5,363	49.5	−19.4
National	David Jenkin	3,369	31.1	+31.1
Liberal	Keith Powell	1,796	16.6	+16.6
Queensland Labor	Alan Birchley	310	2.9	−28.2
Total formal votes		10,838	98.8	+0.6
Informal votes		127	1.2	−0.6
Turnout		10,965	93.3	+0.4
Two-party-preferred result
Labor	Lou Jensen	5,694	52.5	−2.3
National	David Jenken	5,144	47.5	+2.3
Labor hold		Swing	−2.3	

=== Burdekin ===
1974 Queensland state election: Burdekin
Party	Candidate	Votes	%	±%
National	Val Bird	6,603	66.3	+11.9
Labor	Clyde Ferris	2,875	28.9	−10.9
Queensland Labor	Emil Liebrecht	475	4.8	−1.0
Total formal votes		9,953	98.9	0.0
Informal votes		110	1.1	0.0
Turnout		10,063	93.3	+0.6
Two-party-preferred result
National	Val Bird	6,998	70.3	+11.1
Labor	Clyde Ferris	2,955	29.7	−11.1
National hold		Swing	+11.1	

=== Burnett ===
1974 Queensland state election: Burnett
Party	Candidate	Votes	%	±%
National	Claude Wharton	7,951	74.1	+8.2
Labor	Ken Green	2,784	25.9	−2.7
Total formal votes		10,735	99.1	+0.4
Informal votes		100	0.9	−0.4
Turnout		10,835	92.3	+0.6
National hold		Swing	+3.6	

=== Cairns ===
1974 Queensland state election: Cairns
Party	Candidate	Votes	%	±%
Labor	Ray Jones	6,810	50.8	−15.7
National	Robert Duncan	4,555	33.9	+15.7
Independent	William Whelan	1,783	13.3	+13.3
Australia	Robert Ellwood	268	2.0	+2.0
Total formal votes		13,416	98.0	−0.3
Informal votes		268	2.0	+0.3
Turnout		13,684	89.1	−1.2
Two-party-preferred result
Labor	Ray Jones	7,684	57.3	−11.5
National	Robert Duncan	5,732	42.7	+11.5
Labor hold		Swing	−11.5	

=== Callide ===
1974 Queensland state election: Callide
Party	Candidate	Votes	%	±%
National	Lindsay Hartwig	7,243	67.7	+17.4
Labor	Mabel Edmund	1,957	18.3	+18.3
Labor	Wilfred Mutton	1,096	10.2	+10.2
Queensland Labor	Lindsay Sharpe	407	3.8	−8.2
Total formal votes		10,703	98.3	−0.3
Informal votes		181	1.7	+0.3
Turnout		10,884	91.0	−2.9
Two-party-preferred result
National	Lindsay Hartwig	7,581	70.8	+10.5
Labor	Mabel Edmund	3,122	29.2	−10.5
National hold		Swing	+10.5	

=== Carnarvon ===
1974 Queensland state election: Carnarvon
Party	Candidate	Votes	%	±%
National	Peter McKechnie	4,496	50.1	+0.9
Labor	John Saunders	2,244	25.0	−18.0
Liberal	Fred Rogers	1,812	20.2	+20.2
Queensland Labor	Raymond Macnamara	430	4.8	−2.9
Total formal votes		8,982	98.2	−0.5
Informal votes		166	1.8	+0.5
Turnout		9,148	91.7	−1.4
Two-party-preferred result
National	Peter McKechnie	6,432	71.6	+15.7
Labor	John Saunders	2,550	28.4	−15.7
National hold		Swing	+15.7	

=== Chatsworth ===
1974 Queensland state election: Chatsworth
Party	Candidate	Votes	%	±%
Liberal	Bill Hewitt	8,523	65.6	+16.8
Labor	Terry Mackenroth	4,136	31.8	−12.1
Queensland Labor	Mary Scragg	331	2.6	−4.7
Total formal votes		12,990	98.9	+0.2
Informal votes		145	1.1	−0.2
Turnout		13,135	91.5	−2.4
Two-party-preferred result
Liberal	Bill Hewitt	8,798	67.7	+12.6
Labor	Terry Mackenroth	4,192	32.3	−12.6
Liberal hold		Swing	+12.6	

=== Clayfield ===
1974 Queensland state election: Clayfield
Party	Candidate	Votes	%	±%
Liberal	John Murray	7,619	63.3	+16.1
Labor	John Stephens	3,701	30.7	−9.7
Queensland Labor	Francis Andrews	722	6.0	−6.5
Total formal votes		12,042	98.5	+0.3
Informal votes		186	1.5	−0.3
Turnout		12,228	86.0	−5.8
Two-party-preferred result
Liberal	John Murray	8,253	68.5	+10.3
Labor	John Stephens	3,789	31.5	−10.3
Liberal hold		Swing	+10.3	

==== By-election ====
- This by-election was caused by the resignation of John Murray. It was held on 29 May 1976.

1976 Clayfield state by-election
Party	Candidate	Votes	%	±%
Labor	Colin Milford	4,034	37.5	+6.8
Liberal	Ivan Brown	3,699	34.4	−28.9
National	Michael Evans	3,015	28.1	+28.1
Total formal votes		10,748	98.9	+0.4
Informal votes		115	1.1	−0.4
Turnout		10,863	80.6	−5.4
Two-party-preferred result
Liberal	Ivan Brown	6,512	60.6	−7.9
Labor	Colin Milford	4,236	39.4	+7.9
Liberal hold		Swing	−7.9	

=== Condamine ===
1974 Queensland state election: Condamine
Party	Candidate	Votes	%	±%
National	Vic Sullivan	8,560	77.6	+34.0
Labor	Gladys Krause	2,095	19.0	+2.2
Independent	James Drabsch	380	3.4	+3.4
Total formal votes		11,035	98.6	−0.6
Informal votes		152	1.4	+0.6
Turnout		11,187	92.9	−0.1
Two-party-preferred result
National	Vic Sullivan	8,750	79.3	+5.6
Labor	Gladys Krause	2,285	20.7	−5.6
National hold		Swing	+5.6	

=== Cook ===
1974 Queensland state election: Cook
Party	Candidate	Votes	%	±%
Labor	Bob Scott	2,339	35.6	−15.2
National	Eric Deeral	1,477	22.5	+22.5
National	Terrence Mahoney	1,394	21.2	+21.2
Independent	Percy Trezise	566	8.6	+8.6
Liberal	Keith Hollands	466	7.1	+7.1
Australian Advancement	Patrick O'Shane	217	3.3	+3.3
Independent	Graham Gordon	115	1.8	+1.8
Total formal votes		6,574	94.2	−2.7
Informal votes		403	5.8	+2.7
Turnout		6,977	84.3	−0.2
Two-party-preferred result
National	Eric Deeral	3,459	52.6	+6.8
Labor	Bob Scott	3,115	47.4	−6.8
National gain from Labor		Swing	+6.8	

=== Cooroora ===
1974 Queensland state election: Cooroora
Party	Candidate	Votes	%	±%
National	Gordon Simpson	6,812	47.6	−12.9
Liberal	Henry Williams	4,353	30.4	+30.4
Labor	Anthony Dames	2,835	19.8	−12.3
Queensland Labor	Alexander Browne	310	2.2	−5.3
Total formal votes		14,310	98.9	+0.2
Informal votes		163	1.1	−0.2
Turnout		14,473	89.1	−3.1
Two-party-preferred result
National	Gordon Simpson	10,714	74.9	+9.1
Labor	Anthony Dames	3,596	25.1	−9.1
Two-candidate-preferred result
National	Gordon Simpson	7,453	52.1	−13.7
Liberal	Henry Williams	6,857	47.9	+47.9
National hold		Swing	−13.7	

=== Cunningham ===
1974 Queensland state election: Cunningham
Party	Candidate	Votes	%	±%
National	Tony Elliott	8,096	70.9	+12.4
Liberal	Patrick Coonan	1,624	14.2	+14.2
Labor	Ronald Whittington	1,255	11.0	−10.1
Queensland Labor	Robert Barron	439	3.9	−16.6
Total formal votes		11,414	98.7	−0.6
Informal votes		152	1.3	+0.6
Turnout		11,566	93.8	−1.2
Two-party-preferred result
National	Tony Elliott	9,878	86.5	+10.1
Labor	Ronald Whittington	1,536	13.5	−10.1
National hold		Swing	+10.1	

- The two candidate preferred vote was not counted between the National and Liberal candidates for Cunningham.

=== Everton ===
1974 Queensland state election: Everton
Party	Candidate	Votes	%	±%
Liberal	Brian Lindsay	5,972	48.3	+24.8
Labor	Gerry Jones	5,652	45.7	−7.9
Queensland Labor	James Doherty	565	4.6	−2.6
Independent	Theoron Toon	169	1.4	−2.0
Total formal votes		12,358	98.5	+0.5
Informal votes		183	1.5	−0.5
Turnout		12,541	91.1	−3.0
Two-party-preferred result
Liberal	Brian Lindsay	6,518	52.7	+11.0
Labor	Gerry Jones	5,840	47.3	−11.0
Liberal gain from Labor		Swing	+11.0	

=== Fassifern ===
1974 Queensland state election: Fassifern
Party	Candidate	Votes	%	±%
National	Selwyn Muller	11,314	73.0	+17.4
Labor	Clifford Cherry	4,194	27.0	−5.2
Total formal votes		15,508	98.1	−0.7
Informal votes		298	1.9	+0.7
Turnout		15,806	91.1	−1.6
National hold		Swing	+7.3	

=== Flinders ===
1974 Queensland state election: Flinders
Party	Candidate	Votes	%	±%
National	Bob Katter	3,592	47.9	−11.8
Labor	Albert Sorohan	2,497	33.3	−7.0
Liberal	James McGucken	1,412	18.8	+18.8
Total formal votes		7,501	99.4	+0.5
Informal votes		47	0.6	−0.5
Turnout		7,548	88.8	+1.5
Two-party-preferred result
National	Bob Katter	4,789	63.8	+4.1
Labor	Albert Sorohan	2,712	36.2	−4.1
National hold		Swing	+4.1	

=== Greenslopes ===
1974 Queensland state election: Greenslopes
Party	Candidate	Votes	%	±%
Liberal	Keith Hooper	8,269	66.7	−14.1
Labor	Joseph Sciacca	3,615	29.2	−13.1
Queensland Labor	Harry Wright	517	4.2	−3.4
Total formal votes		12,401	98.9	+0.4
Informal votes		137	1.1	−0.4
Turnout		12,538	89.0	−4.1
Two-party-preferred result
Liberal	Keith Hooper	8,709	70.2	+15.2
Labor	Joseph Sciacca	3,692	29.8	−15.2
Liberal hold		Swing	+15.2	

=== Gregory ===
1974 Queensland state election: Gregory
Party	Candidate	Votes	%	±%
National	Bill Glasson	3,823	62.0	+9.4
Labor	Gordon Harding	2,338	38.0	−9.4
Total formal votes		6,161	99.2	+0.1
Informal votes		47	0.8	−0.1
Turnout		6,208	87.6	+1.4
National hold		Swing	+9.4	

=== Gympie ===
1974 Queensland state election: Gympie
Party	Candidate	Votes	%	±%
National	Max Hodges	7,942	73.6	+19.9
Labor	N. Box	2,850	26.4	−11.6
Total formal votes		10,792	98.5	−0.6
Informal votes		163	1.5	+0.6
Turnout		10,955	93.6	+0.2
National hold		Swing	+13.9	

=== Hinchinbrook ===
1974 Queensland state election: Hinchinbrook
Party	Candidate	Votes	%	±%
National	Ted Row	5,872	56.3	+15.9
Labor	Desley Clinton	3,448	33.1	−11.5
Queensland Labor	John Williams	911	8.7	−6.3
Australian Advancement	Evelyn Scott	199	1.9	+1.9
Total formal votes		10,430	97.8	−0.3
Informal votes		236	2.2	+0.3
Turnout		10,666	90.9	−2.0
Two-party-preferred result
National	Ted Row	6,728	60.4	+7.9
Labor	Desley Clinton	3,702	39.6	−7.9
National hold		Swing	+7.9	

=== Ipswich ===
1974 Queensland state election: Ipswich
Party	Candidate	Votes	%	±%
Liberal	Llew Edwards	8,913	66.2	+27.4
Labor	John Kinnane	3,968	29.5	−15.8
Queensland Labor	Francis Carroll	399	3.0	−1.8
Socialist	Gregory Welsby	175	1.3	+1.3
Total formal votes		13,455	98.7	+0.9
Informal votes		179	1.3	−0.9
Turnout		13,634	93.4	+0.3
Two-party-preferred result
Liberal	Llew Edwards	9,299	69.1	+17.9
Labor	John Kinnane	4,156	30.9	−17.9
Liberal hold		Swing	+17.9	

=== Ipswich West ===
1974 Queensland state election: Ipswich West
Party	Candidate	Votes	%	±%
Labor	Vi Jordan	6,028	46.0	−11.9
National	Albert Hales	3,328	25.4	+25.4
Liberal	Ronda Herrmann	3,075	23.5	−0.5
Queensland Labor	John Dredge	676	5.2	−2.4
Total formal votes		13,107	98.2	−0.3
Informal votes		233	1.8	+0.3
Turnout		13,340	92.1	+0.2
Two-party-preferred result
National	Albert Hales	6,622	50.5	+12.0
Labor	Vi Jordan	6,485	49.5	−12.0
National gain from Labor		Swing	+12.0	

=== Isis ===
1974 Queensland state election: Isis
Party	Candidate	Votes	%	±%
Labor	Jim Blake	6,994	45.0	−10.3
National	Lin Powell	5,190	33.4	+6.5
National	Barry Wright	3,360	21.6	+21.6
Total formal votes		15,544	99.0	0.0
Informal votes		153	1.0	0.0
Turnout		15,697	91.7	−2.4
Two-party-preferred result
National	Lin Powell	8,411	54.1	+12.4
Labor	Jim Blake	7,133	45.9	−12.4
National gain from Labor		Swing	+12.4	

=== Ithaca ===
1974 Queensland state election: Ithaca
Party	Candidate	Votes	%	±%
Liberal	Col Miller	7,940	65.4	+17.3
Labor	Robert Coutts	4,196	34.6	−8.7
Total formal votes		12,136	98.2	−0.2
Informal votes		216	1.8	+0.2
Turnout		12,352	87.1	−5.5
Liberal hold		Swing	+9.8	

=== Kurilpa ===
1974 Queensland state election: Kurilpa
Party	Candidate	Votes	%	±%
Liberal	Sam Doumany	4,673	40.3	−5.2
Labor	Frank Gardiner	4,355	37.6	−8.8
National	Col Bennett	1,902	16.4	+16.4
National	Brendan Clark-Coolee	453	3.9	+3.9
Queensland Labor	Damien White	210	1.8	−5.4
Total formal votes		11,593	97.5	−0.3
Informal votes		300	2.5	+0.3
Turnout		11,893	86.5	−5.0
Two-party-preferred result
Liberal	Sam Doumany	7,066	61.0	+9.5
Labor	Frank Gardiner	4,527	39.0	−9.5
Liberal hold		Swing	+9.5	

=== Landsborough ===
1974 Queensland state election: Landsborough
Party	Candidate	Votes	%	±%
National	Mike Ahern	11,828	67.7	+13.4
Labor	Ivan Guy	3,918	22.4	−7.0
Independent	Paul Cowan	1,719	9.8	+9.8
Total formal votes		17,465	98.6	+0.1
Informal votes		252	1.4	−0.1
Turnout		17,717	89.2	−3.5
Two-party-preferred result
National	Mike Ahern	12,688	72.6	+6.9
Labor	Ivan Guy	4,777	27.4	−6.9
National hold		Swing	+6.9	

=== Lockyer ===
1974 Queensland state election: Lockyer
Party	Candidate	Votes	%	±%
Liberal	Sir Gordon Chalk	7,676	56.0	−6.2
Independent	Kenneth Hooper	3,359	24.5	+24.5
Labor	Lindesay Jones	2,677	19.5	−18.3
Total formal votes		13,712	99.1	+0.8
Informal votes		130	0.9	−0.8
Turnout		13,842	90.2	−3.7
Two-party-preferred result
Liberal	Sir Gordon Chalk	10,363	75.6	+13.4
Labor	Lindesay Jones	3,349	24.4	−13.4
Liberal hold		Swing	+13.4	

- The two candidate preferred vote was not counted between the Liberal and Independent candidates for Lockyer.

==== By-election ====
- This by-election was caused by the resignation of Gordon Chalk. It was held on 16 October 1976.

1976 Lockyer state by-election
Party	Candidate	Votes	%	±%
Liberal	Tony Bourke	5,463	40.6	−15.4
National	Neville Adermann	4,042	30.0	+30.0
Labor	Sydney Thomson	3,098	23.0	+3.5
Workers	Michael Farrell	371	2.8	+2.8
Independent	Brian Otto	307	2.3	+2.3
Australia	Geoffrey Barlow	160	1.2	+1.2
Independent Labor	Christopher Caldwell	19	0.1	+0.1
Total formal votes		13,460	98.6	+0.5
Informal votes		189	1.4	−0.5
Turnout		13,649	87.7	−2.5
Two-candidate-preferred result
Liberal	Tony Bourke	8,907	66.2	
National	Neville Adermann	4,553	33.8	
Liberal hold		Swing	N/A	

=== Lytton ===
1974 Queensland state election: Lytton
Party	Candidate	Votes	%	±%
Labor	Tom Burns	8,165	56.7	−11.5
Liberal	John Ivers	6,225	43.3	+17.5
Total formal votes		14,390	98.5	+0.1
Informal votes		213	1.5	−0.1
Turnout		14,603	90.2	−4.5
Labor hold		Swing	−12.6	

=== Mackay ===
1974 Queensland state election: Mackay
Party	Candidate	Votes	%	±%
Independent	Ed Casey	9,016	57.3	+21.1
National	Lionel Bevis	4,282	27.2	+1.5
Labor	John Hill	2,437	15.5	−12.3
Total formal votes		15,735	98.7	0.0
Informal votes		199	1.3	0.0
Turnout		15,934	89.5	−3.1
Two-candidate-preferred result
Independent	Ed Casey	11,087	70.5	+7.1
National	Lionel Bevis	4,648	29.5	−7.1
Independent hold		Swing	+0.8	

=== Mansfield ===
1974 Queensland state election: Mansfield
Party	Candidate	Votes	%	±%
Liberal	Bill Kaus	11,945	69.3	+24.5
Labor	Desmond Rowland	4,687	27.2	−18.8
Queensland Labor	Lionel Lane	612	3.6	−4.3
Total formal votes		17,244	98.5	+0.3
Informal votes		266	1.5	−0.3
Turnout		17,510	90.7	−3.4
Two-party-preferred result
Liberal	Bill Kaus	12,454	72.2	+20.2
Labor	Desmond Rowland	4,790	27.8	−20.2
Liberal hold		Swing	+20.2	

=== Maryborough ===
1974 Queensland state election: Maryborough
Party	Candidate	Votes	%	±%
Liberal	Gilbert Alison	6,598	55.0	+2.6
Labor	John Anderson	5,272	43.9	−2.1
Queensland Labor	Matthews Minnegal	132	1.1	−0.5
Total formal votes		12,002	99.0	−0.1
Informal votes		124	1.0	+0.1
Turnout		12,126	93.8	−1.7
Two-party-preferred result
Liberal	Gilbert Alison	6,708	55.9	+2.1
Labor	John Anderson	5,294	44.1	−2.1
Liberal hold		Swing	+2.1	

=== Merthyr ===
1974 Queensland state election: Merthyr
Party	Candidate	Votes	%	±%
Liberal	Don Lane	7,004	66.6	+14.4
Labor	Terence Dawson	3,517	33.4	−6.1
Total formal votes		10,521	97.8	0.0
Informal votes		241	2.2	0.0
Turnout		10,762	85.0	−7.5
Liberal hold		Swing	+7.5	

=== Mirani ===
1974 Queensland state election: Mirani
Party	Candidate	Votes	%	±%
National	Tom Newbery	6,610	69.6	+7.5
Labor	Leslie Dwyer	2,882	30.4	−7.5
Total formal votes		9,492	98.8	0.0
Informal votes		114	1.2	0.0
Turnout		9,606	90.8	−1.7
National hold		Swing	+7.5	

=== Mount Coot-tha ===
1974 Queensland state election: Mount Coot-tha
Party	Candidate	Votes	%	±%
Liberal	Bill Lickiss	11,560	75.1	+18.5
Labor	Ian De Lacy	3,495	22.7	−9.4
Queensland Labor	Ross Domrow	331	2.2	−9.1
Total formal votes		15,386	98.7	0.0
Informal votes		206	1.3	0.0
Turnout		15,592	89.9	−1.3
Two-party-preferred result
Liberal	Bill Lickiss	11,835	76.9	+10.9
Labor	Ian De Lacy	3,551	23.1	−10.9
Liberal hold		Swing	+10.9	

=== Mount Gravatt ===
1974 Queensland state election: Mount Gravatt
Party	Candidate	Votes	%	±%
Liberal	Geoff Chinchen	10,200	66.9	+20.6
Labor	Bill Avery	4,656	30.5	−16.1
Queensland Labor	Therese Sheil	396	2.6	−4.5
Total formal votes		15,252	98.9	+0.1
Informal votes		164	1.1	−0.1
Turnout		15,416	91.2	−4.3
Two-party-preferred result
Liberal	Geoff Chinchen	10,529	69.0	+16.5
Labor	Bill Avery	4,723	31.0	−16.5
Liberal hold		Swing	+16.5	

=== Mount Isa ===
1974 Queensland state election: Mount Isa
Party	Candidate	Votes	%	±%
Labor	John Shepherd	4,926	38.9	−26.0
National	Angelo Bertoni	3,923	31.0	+4.5
Liberal	Kevin Coughlan	3,815	30.1	+30.1
Total formal votes		12,664	97.2	+0.1
Informal votes		358	2.8	−0.1
Turnout		13,022	81.4	−2.1
Two-party-preferred result
National	Angelo Bertoni	6,775	53.5	+19.9
Labor	John Shepherd	5,889	46.5	−19.9
National gain from Labor		Swing	+19.9	

=== Mourilyan ===
1974 Queensland state election: Mourilyan
Party	Candidate	Votes	%	±%
National	Vicky Kippin	4,772	48.3	+15.7
Labor	Peter Moore	4,674	47.3	−8.4
Queensland Labor	Salvatore Nucifora	432	4.4	−7.3
Total formal votes		9,878	98.5	+0.2
Informal votes		151	1.5	−0.2
Turnout		10,029	89.5	−1.9
Two-party-preferred result
National	Vicky Kippin	5,102	51.7	+8.9
Labor	Peter Moore	4,776	48.3	−8.9
National gain from Labor		Swing	+8.9	

=== Mulgrave ===
1974 Queensland state election: Mulgrave
Party	Candidate	Votes	%	±%
National	Roy Armstrong	6,023	64.8	+6.4
Labor	Louie Tognola	3,269	35.2	−6.4
Total formal votes		9,292	98.4	+0.3
Informal votes		152	1.6	−0.3
Turnout		9,444	91.9	−0.7
National hold		Swing	+6.4	

=== Murrumba ===
1974 Queensland state election: Murrumba
Party	Candidate	Votes	%	±%
National	Des Frawley	11,080	63.7	+30.1
Labor	Neville Lines	6,320	36.3	−10.0
Total formal votes		17,400	97.7	−0.5
Informal votes		415	2.3	+0.3
Turnout		17,815	89.7	−3.2
National hold		Swing	+12.7	

=== Nudgee ===
1974 Queensland state election: Nudgee
Party	Candidate	Votes	%	±%
Labor	Jack Melloy	7,399	54.1	−10.2
Liberal	Denis Simonyi	6,286	45.9	+19.2
Total formal votes		13,685	98.5	+0.3
Informal votes		208	1.5	−0.3
Turnout		13,893	91.2	−3.2
Labor hold		Swing	−11.3	

=== Nundah ===
1974 Queensland state election: Nundah
Party	Candidate	Votes	%	±%
Liberal	William Knox	7,645	63.8	+16.5
Labor	Leonard Hingley	4,337	36.2	−9.0
Total formal votes		11,982	98.2	−0.8
Informal votes		219	1.8	+0.8
Turnout		12,201	88.5	−5.3
Liberal hold		Swing	+9.9	

=== Pine Rivers ===
1974 Queensland state election: Pine Rivers
Party	Candidate	Votes	%	±%
Liberal	Rob Akers	8,761	39.7	+21.8
Labor	Kenneth Leese	8,132	36.8	−16.5
National	Donald Hawkins	5,185	23.5	+0.3
Total formal votes		22,078	98.7	+0.3
Informal votes		294	1.3	−0.3
Turnout		22,372	91.2	−2.7
Two-party-preferred result
Liberal	Rob Akers	13,667	61.9	+18.7
Labor	Kenneth Leese	8,411	38.1	−18.7
Liberal gain from Labor		Swing	+18.7	

=== Port Curtis ===
1974 Queensland state election: Port Curtis
Party	Candidate	Votes	%	±%
Labor	Martin Hanson	9,738	63.1	−19.1
Liberal	Douglas Cuddy	2,878	18.6	+18.6
National	Francis Waterson	2,817	18.2	+18.2
Total formal votes		15,433	98.6	+0.7
Informal votes		212	1.4	−0.7
Turnout		15,645	89.3	−2.3
Two-party-preferred result
Labor	Martin Hanson	10,132	65.7	−16.5
Liberal	Douglas Cuddy	5,301	34.3	+34.3
Labor hold		Swing	−16.5	

==== By-election ====
- This by-election was caused by the resignation of Martin Hanson, who died a day later. It was held on 29 May 1976.

1976 Port Curtis state by-election
Party	Candidate	Votes	%	±%
Labor	Bill Prest	7,846	51.8	−11.3
National	Maurice Elliot	3,625	23.9	+5.7
Liberal	John Mawer	1,941	12.8	−5.8
Independent	Lloyd Curtis	1,749	11.5	+11.5
Total formal votes		15,181	99.1	+0.5
Informal votes		135	0.9	−0.5
Turnout		15,296	86.6	−2.7
Labor hold		Swing	N/A	

- Preferences were not distributed.

=== Redcliffe ===
1974 Queensland state election: Redcliffe
Party	Candidate	Votes	%	±%
National	Jim Houghton	6,921	50.5	+17.1
Labor	Jack Trueman	4,915	35.9	−5.8
Independent	George Wise	1,528	11.2	+11.2
Queensland Labor	Paul Maguire	334	2.4	−3.2
Total formal votes		13,698	98.5	−0.1
Informal votes		211	1.5	+0.1
Turnout		13,909	90.4	−2.5
Two-party-preferred result
National	Jim Houghton	8,513	62.1	+6.7
Labor	Jack Trueman	5,185	37.9	−6.7
National hold		Swing	+6.7	

=== Redlands ===
1974 Queensland state election: Redlands
Party	Candidate	Votes	%	±%
Labor	Ted Baldwin	7,357	36.4	−15.2
National	John Goleby	6,430	31.8	+7.5
Liberal	Brian Dee	6,207	30.7	+10.3
Queensland Labor	Peter McMahon	228	1.1	−2.5
Total formal votes		20,222	98.4	+0.1
Informal votes		321	1.6	−0.1
Turnout		20,543	88.7	−2.6
Two-party-preferred result
National	John Goleby	12,075	59.7	+14.8
Labor	Ted Baldwin	8,147	40.3	−14.8
National gain from Labor		Swing	+14.8	

=== Rockhampton ===
1974 Queensland state election: Rockhampton
Party	Candidate	Votes	%	±%
Labor	Keith Wright	6,347	50.9	−2.3
Liberal	Alan Agnew	3,814	30.6	+4.0
National	Michael Bleines	1,915	15.4	+0.8
Queensland Labor	Robert Bom	385	3.1	−2.4
Total formal votes		12,461	99.3	+0.3
Informal votes		88	0.7	−0.3
Turnout		12,549	93.0	−1.5
Two-party-preferred result
Labor	Keith Wright	6,680	53.6	−2.3
Liberal	Alan Agnew	5,781	46.4	+2.3
Labor hold		Swing	−2.3	

=== Rockhampton North ===
1974 Queensland state election: Rockhampton North
Party	Candidate	Votes	%	±%
Labor	Les Yewdale	8,074	54.5	+10.5
Liberal	T.R. Young	5,879	39.7	+15.1
Queensland Labor	John Dunn	860	5.8	−2.3
Total formal votes		14,813	98.9	+0.3
Informal votes		162	1.1	−0.3
Turnout		14,975	95.1	−1.7
Two-party-preferred result
Labor	Les Yewdale	8,315	56.1	+5.0
Liberal	T.R. Young	5,781	43.9	−5.0
Labor hold		Swing	+5.0	

=== Roma ===
1974 Queensland state election: Roma
Party	Candidate	Votes	%	±%
National	Ken Tomkins	5,744	72.6	+19.6
Labor	Ben Ward	2,168	27.4	−4.4
Total formal votes		7,912	99.1	+0.1
Informal votes		74	0.9	−0.1
Turnout		7,986	88.9	−1.9
National hold		Swing	+8.6	

=== Salisbury ===
1974 Queensland state election: Salisbury
Party	Candidate	Votes	%	±%
Labor	Bill Wilcox	7,824	43.3	−21.7
Liberal	Rosemary Kyburz	6,559	36.2	+11.4
National	Leonard Spies	3,194	17.9	+17.9
Queensland Labor	Miroslav Jansky	515	2.9	−7.3
Total formal votes		18,092	97.5	−1.0
Informal votes		468	2.5	+1.0
Turnout		18,560	86.5	−5.7
Two-party-preferred result
Liberal	Rosemary Kyburz	10,019	55.4	+22.1
Labor	Bill Wilcox	8,073	44.6	−22.1
Liberal gain from Labor		Swing	+22.1	

=== Sandgate ===
1974 Queensland state election: Sandgate
Party	Candidate	Votes	%	±%
Labor	Harry Dean	6,758	53.5	−8.2
Liberal	Malcolm Thompson	5,870	46.5	+23.4
Total formal votes		12,628	97.6	−0.6
Informal votes		316	2.4	+0.6
Turnout		12,944	91.7	−0.3
Labor hold		Swing	−10.1	

=== Sherwood ===
1974 Queensland state election: Sherwood
Party	Candidate	Votes	%	±%
Liberal	John Herbert	10,898	69.7	+16.1
Labor	Kerry Keating	4,171	26.7	−12.2
Queensland Labor	Clarice Weedon	566	3.6	−3.9
Total formal votes		15,635	98.6	+0.3
Informal votes		219	1.4	−0.3
Turnout		15,854	90.6	−2.8
Two-party-preferred result
Liberal	John Herbert	11,368	72.7	+12.9
Labor	Kerry Keating	4,267	27.3	−12.9
Liberal hold		Swing	+12.9	

=== Somerset ===
1974 Queensland state election: Somerset
Party	Candidate	Votes	%	±%
National	Bill Gunn	9,656	74.7	+18.2
Labor	Gordon Abbott	2,348	18.2	−13.4
Independent	Keith Hughes	918	7.1	+7.1
Total formal votes		12,922	99.2	+0.2
Informal votes		107	0.8	−0.2
Turnout		13,029	93.2	−0.3
Two-party-preferred result
National	Bill Gunn	10,115	78.3	+12.0
Labor	Gordon Abbott	2,807	21.7	−12.0
National hold		Swing	+12.0	

=== South Brisbane ===
1974 Queensland state election: South Brisbane
Party	Candidate	Votes	%	±%
Liberal	Colin Lamont	6,414	55.0	+29.6
Labor	Fred Bromley	5,250	45.0	−4.4
Total formal votes		11,664	97.9	+1.1
Informal votes		249	2.1	−1.1
Turnout		11,913	83.9	−7.7
Liberal gain from Labor		Swing	+16.0	

=== South Coast ===
1974 Queensland state election: South Coast
Party	Candidate	Votes	%	±%
National	Russ Hinze	11,544	67.7	+28.5
Labor	Marion Reid	5,513	32.3	−1.8
Total formal votes		17,057	97.4	−0.4
Informal votes		456	2.6	+0.4
Turnout		17,513	83.9	−4.4
National hold		Swing	+6.0	

=== Stafford ===
1974 Queensland state election: Stafford
Party	Candidate	Votes	%	±%
Liberal	Terry Gygar	8,034	57.5	+16.8
Labor	Roy Harvey	5,211	37.3	−12.2
Queensland Labor	Edward Doherty	603	4.3	−5.5
Independent	Laurence Gormley	130	0.9	+0.9
Total formal votes		13,978	98.9	+3.5
Informal votes		156	1.1	−3.5
Turnout		14,134	90.5	−3.8
Two-party-preferred result
Liberal	Terry Gygar	8,628	61.7	+13.3
Labor	Roy Harvey	5,350	38.3	−13.3
Liberal gain from Labor		Swing	+13.3	

=== Surfers Paradise ===
1974 Queensland state election: Surfers Paradise
Party	Candidate	Votes	%	±%
National	Bruce Small	10,277	58.7	+29.3
Labor	Maurice Marsden	4,215	24.1	−6.0
Independent	John Duncan	2,631	15.0	+15.0
Queensland Labor	John Perrett	376	2.2	−1.6
Total formal votes		17,499	97.9	+0.7
Informal votes		373	2.1	−0.7
Turnout		17,872	85.4	−2.4
Two-party-preferred result
National	Bruce Small	12,694	72.5	+12.9
Labor	Maurice Marsden	4,805	27.5	−12.9
National hold		Swing	+12.9	

=== Toowong ===
1974 Queensland state election: Toowong
Party	Candidate	Votes	%	±%
Liberal	Charles Porter	8,950	68.6	+13.0
Labor	Donald Dignam	3,621	27.8	−7.7
Queensland Labor	Brian O'Brien	474	3.6	−5.3
Total formal votes		13,045	98.8	+0.1
Informal votes		164	1.2	−0.1
Turnout		13,209	86.8	−5.3
Two-party-preferred result
Liberal	Charles Porter	9,344	71.6	+8.6
Labor	Donald Dignam	3,701	28.4	−8.6
Liberal hold		Swing	+8.6	

=== Toowoomba North ===
1974 Queensland state election: Toowoomba North
Party	Candidate	Votes	%	±%
Liberal	John Lockwood	6,848	52.3	+38.8
Labor	Ray Bousen	6,245	47.7	−14.1
Total formal votes		13,093	99.0	−0.2
Informal votes		133	1.0	+0.2
Turnout		13,226	89.7	−3.9
Liberal gain from Labor		Swing	+17.2	

=== Toowoomba South ===
1974 Queensland state election: Toowoomba South
Party	Candidate	Votes	%	±%
Labor	Peter Wood	5,469	38.4	−14.7
National	John Warner	4,647	29.3	+8.2
Liberal	Leslie Whykes	3,218	21.8	+3.2
Queensland Labor	Mary Ryan	501	3.2	−4.0
Total formal votes		13,835	98.7	−0.2
Informal votes		178	1.3	+0.2
Turnout		14,013	88.4	−5.6
Two-party-preferred result
National	John Warner	7,989	57.7	+14.6
Labor	Peter Wood	5,846	42.3	−14.6
National gain from Labor		Swing	+14.6	

=== Townsville ===
1974 Queensland state election: Townsville
Party	Candidate	Votes	%	±%
Liberal	Norman Scott-Young	9,443	62.0	+25.5
Labor	Richard Lindsay	4,427	29.1	−14.2
Queensland Labor	Brian Hurney	690	4.5	−2.8
Australia	Betty Malkin	668	4.4	+4.4
Total formal votes		15,228	98.8	+0.2
Informal votes		185	1.2	−0.2
Turnout		15,413	83.8	−2.0
Two-party-preferred result
Liberal	Norman Scott-Young	10,207	67.0	+5.5
Labor	Richard Lindsay	5,021	33.0	−5.5
Liberal hold		Swing	+5.5	

=== Townsville South ===
1974 Queensland state election: Townsville South
Party	Candidate	Votes	%	±%
Independent	Tom Aikens	5,881	48.5	−2.5
Labor	Alex Wilson	4,924	40.6	−0.1
Australia	Leonard Weber	691	5.7	+5.7
Queensland Labor	John Judge	628	5.2	−3.1
Total formal votes		12,124	97.5	−1.2
Informal votes		306	2.5	+1.2
Turnout		12,430	85.7	−8.2
Two-candidate-preferred result
Independent	Tom Aikens	6,770	55.8	−1.8
Labor	Alex Wilson	5,354	44.2	+1.8
Independent hold		Swing	−1.8	

=== Townsville West ===
1974 Queensland state election: Townsville West
Party	Candidate	Votes	%	±%
Labor	Perc Tucker	5,318	42.8	−6.4
Liberal	Keith Rundle	2,926	23.5	−4.0
National	Max Hooper	1,652	13.3	+13.3
National	Bryan Newell	1,606	12.9	+12.9
Queensland Labor	Kiernan Dorney	926	7.4	−2.8
Total formal votes		12,428	98.7	0.0
Informal votes		163	1.3	0.0
Turnout		12,591	90.6	−1.1
Two-party-preferred result
National	Max Hooper	6,657	53.6	+5.8
Labor	Perc Tucker	5,771	46.4	−5.8
National gain from Labor		Swing	+5.8	

=== Warrego ===
1974 Queensland state election: Warrego
Party	Candidate	Votes	%	±%
National	Neil Turner	4,153	51.0	+14.4
Labor	Jack Aiken	3,985	49.0	−14.4
Total formal votes		8,078	98.6	−0.1
Informal votes		117	1.4	+0.1
Turnout		8,255	91.1	+0.9
National gain from Labor		Swing	+14.4	

=== Warwick ===
1974 Queensland state election: Warwick
Party	Candidate	Votes	%	±%
National	David Cory	7,052	74.8	+25.5
Labor	Raymond Lyons	2,374	25.2	−10.2
Total formal votes		9,426	98.8	−0.1
Informal votes		112	1.2	+0.1
Turnout		9,538	91.9	−3.0
National hold		Swing	+13.3	

=== Wavell ===
1974 Queensland state election: Wavell
Party	Candidate	Votes	%	±%
Liberal	Arthur Crawford	8,388	62.6	+18.1
Labor	Jack Geran	4,554	34.0	−13.0
Queensland Labor	Mervyn Eunson	465	3.5	−5.0
Total formal votes		13,407	99.0	−0.1
Informal votes		137	1.0	+0.1
Turnout		13,544	91.7	−2.8
Two-party-preferred result
Liberal	Arthur Crawford	8,774	65.4	+13.2
Labor	Jack Geran	4,633	34.6	−13.2
Liberal hold		Swing	+13.2	

=== Whitsunday ===
1974 Queensland state election: Whitsunday
Party	Candidate	Votes	%	±%
National	Ron Camm	6,828	62.2	+9.5
Labor	Stanley Yardley	4,152	37.8	−4.4
Total formal votes		10,980	98.8	+0.1
Informal votes		137	1.2	−0.1
Turnout		11,117	88.6	−5.1
National hold		Swing	+5.3	

=== Windsor ===
1974 Queensland state election: Windsor
Party	Candidate	Votes	%	±%
Liberal	Bob Moore	7,505	61.0	+17.5
Labor	Gloria Markland	3,960	32.2	−11.6
Queensland Labor	Anne Wenck	484	3.9	−8.8
Independent	Mervyn Chambers	358	2.9	+2.9
Total formal votes		12,307	98.5	−0.2
Informal votes		185	1.5	+0.2
Turnout		12,492	89.7	−3.9
Two-party-preferred result
Liberal	Bob Moore	8,086	65.7	+10.6
Labor	Gloria Markland	4,221	34.3	−10.6
Liberal hold		Swing	+10.6	

=== Wolston ===
1974 Queensland state election: Wolston
Party	Candidate	Votes	%	±%
Labor	Evan Marginson	7,111	48.1	−17.3
Liberal	Dirk Plooy	6,363	43.0	+21.7
Independent	Albert Blaine	855	5.8	+5.8
Queensland Labor	Leonard Maguire	463	3.1	−4.9
Total formal votes		14,792	97.5	+0.2
Informal votes		376	2.5	−0.2
Turnout		15,168	87.4	−4.8
Two-party-preferred result
Labor	Evan Marginson	7,742	52.3	−18.0
Liberal	Dirk Plooy	7,050	47.6	+18.0
Labor hold		Swing	−18.0	

=== Wynnum ===
1974 Queensland state election: Wynnum
Party	Candidate	Votes	%	±%
Labor	Ted Harris	5,829	47.0	−16.3
National	Bill Lamond	3,686	29.7	+29.7
Liberal	William Vaughan	2,734	22.6	−6.9
Queensland Labor	Gordon Randall	150	1.2	−6.0
Total formal votes		12,399	98.6	0.0
Informal votes		178	1.4	0.0
Turnout		12,577	93.2	−0.4
Two-party-preferred result
National	Bill Lamond	6,211	50.1	+14.6
Labor	Ted Harris	6,188	49.9	−14.6
National gain from Labor		Swing	+14.6	

=== Yeronga ===
1974 Queensland state election: Yeronga
Party	Candidate	Votes	%	±%
Liberal	Norm Lee	7,954	65.5	+17.2
Labor	Spencer Higgins	3,842	31.6	−13.3
Queensland Labor	Andrew Jackson	354	2.9	−3.8
Total formal votes		12,150	98.6	−0.1
Informal votes		174	1.4	+0.1
Turnout		12,324	89.0	−5.3
Two-party-preferred result
Liberal	Norm Lee	8,248	67.9	+13.6
Labor	Spencer Higgins	3,902	32.1	−13.6
Liberal hold		Swing	+13.6	

== See also ==
- 1974 Queensland state election
- Members of the Queensland Legislative Assembly, 1974-1977
