= Candidates of the 1972 Queensland state election =

The 1972 Queensland state election was held on 27 May 1972.

== Retiring members ==
- Note: Albert Liberal MLA Bill Heatley, Balonne Country MLA Harold Hungerford and Callide Country MLA Vince Jones had died prior to the election, while Bowen Liberal MLA Peter Delamothe had resigned; no by-elections had been held to replace them.

=== Labor ===
- Eric Lloyd MLA (Kedron)

=== Country ===
- Sir David Nicholson MLA (Murrumba)
- Sir Harold Richter MLA (Somerset)
- John Row MLA (Hinchinbrook)

=== Democratic Labor ===
- Les Diplock MLA (Aubigny)

== Candidates ==
Sitting members at the time of the election are shown in bold text.

Electorate	Held by	Labor candidate	Coalition candidate	DLP candidate	Independent candidates
Albert	Liberal	Bill D'Arcy	Robert Allen (Lib); Ivan Gibbs (CP)	Thomas McKenzie	John Black; William Wollstein
Archerfield	Labor	Kevin Hooper	Cyril Morgan (Lib)	Barry Weedon	
Ashgrove	Liberal	Walter Tutt	**Douglas Tooth** (Lib)	Bert Vann	Ivan Alcorn
Aspley	Liberal	John Steensen	**Fred Campbell** (Lib)	Noel Hutchinson	
Auburn	Country	Roden Carter	**Nev Hewitt** (CP)	Lindsay Sharpe	
Balonne	Country	Bob Drenan	Don Neal (CP)	John Donnelly	William Dendle
Barambah	Country	Neville Reinke	**Joh Bjelke-Petersen** (CP)	Mary Ryan	Percy Edwards
Baroona	Labor	**Pat Hanlon**	John Andrews (Lib)	Maurice O'Connor	
Barron River	Labor	**Bill Wood**	Micheli Borzi (CP); Rex Silver (Lib)	Thomas White	
Belmont	Labor	**Fred Newton**	Maurice Hughes (Lib)	Thomas Connor	
Belyando	Labor	**Eugene O'Donnell**	Vince Lester (CP)		
Brisbane	Labor	**Brian Davis**	Harold Lowes (Lib)	Kenneth Walpole	Llewellyn Davies
Bulimba	Labor	**Jack Houston**	Megan Wilding (Lib)	Paul Tucker	
Bundaberg	Labor	**Lou Jensen**		Alan Birchley	
Burdekin	Country	Ronald Nuttall	**Val Bird** (CP)	Emil Liebrecht	
Burnett	Country	Granville Batkines	**Claude Wharton** (CP)	Leonard Galligan	
Cairns	Labor	**Ray Jones**	Arthur Kalman (CP); David Palmer (Lib)	Bernard Marsh	
Callide	Country	Charles Tutt	Lindsay Hartwig (CP)	Edgar Lanigan	
Carnarvon	Country	Neil Sullivan	**Henry McKechnie** (CP)	Raymond Macnamara	
Chatsworth	Liberal	H Zehr	**Bill Hewitt** (Lib)	Maurice Sheehan	
Clayfield	Liberal	John Stephens	**John Murray** (Lib)	Francis Andrews	
Condamine	Country	Gladys Krause	**Vic Sullivan** (CP)	William Hickey	Charles Russell
Cook	Labor	**Edwin Wallis-Smith**	Graham Gordon (CP)	Benjamin Nona	
Cooroora	Country	Anthony Dames	**David Low** (CP)	Alexander Browne	
Cunningham	Country	Brian Graham	**Alan Fletcher** (CP)	Eugene Connolly	
Everton	Labor	Gerry Jones	Denver Beanland (Lib); Fred Roberts (CP)	Lyle Jehn	Theoron Toon
Fassifern	Country	Murray Freiberg	**Selwyn Muller** (CP)	Luke O'Reilly	
Flinders	Country	Peter Lindenmayer	**Bill Longeran** (CP)		
Greenslopes	Liberal	Lewis Wyvill	**Keith Hooper** (Lib)	Denis Cochran	Lynn Aberdeen
Gregory	Country	Gordon Harding	**Wally Rae** (CP)		
Gympie	Country	Alex Pringle	**Max Hodges** (CP)	Benedict Kehoe	Cecil Rivers
Hinchinbrook	Country	James Byrne	Ted Row (CP)	Peter Wood	
Ipswich	Labor	Phillip Dwyer	Llewellyn Edwards (Lib)	Francis Carroll	David Laird; Victor Robb; Douglas Wood
Ipswich West	Labor	**Vi Jordan**	Allan Whybird (Lib)	Ernest Devin	Robert Maxwell
Isis	Labor	**Jim Blake**	Kenneth Murphy (Lib); Alfred Plath (CP)		Eric Andrew
Ithaca	Liberal	Sylvester Martin	**Col Miller** (Lib)	Mervyn Eunson	
Kurilpa	Liberal	Frank Gardiner	**Clive Hughes** (Lib)	Edward Doherty	Michael Neenan
Landsborough	Country	Roger Jeffries	**Mike Ahern*** (CP); David Barker (Lib)		
Lockyer	Liberal	Lindesay Jones	**Sir Gordon Chalk** (Lib)		
Lytton	Labor	Tom Burns	John Ottway (Lib)	John O'Connell	
Mackay	Labor	John Breen	Robert Gray (Lib); Charles Johnstone (CP)		**Ed Casey**
Mansfield	Liberal	Raymond Lynch	**Bill Kaus** (Lib)	John Thompson	William Kenney
Maryborough	Liberal	Edward Weber	**Gilbert Alison** (Lib)	Matthews Minnegal	
Merthyr	Liberal	Denis Pie	**Don Lane** (Lib)	James Moss	
Mirani	Country	Bernard Kirwan	**Tom Newbery** (CP)		
Mount Coot-tha	Liberal	Ian De Lacy	**Bill Lickiss** (Lib)	Cecilia Edwards	
Mount Gravatt	Liberal	Bill Avery	**Geoff Chinchen** (Lib)	Michael Scragg	
Mount Isa	Labor	**Alec Inch**	Lillian Noakes (CP)	John Turner	
Mourilyan	Labor	**Peter Moore**	Peter Mitchell (CP)	Geoffrey Higham	
Mulgrave	Country	Leslie Scheu	**Roy Armstrong** (CP)		
Murrumba	Country	Alex Barr	Des Frawley* (CP); Kathleen MacAdam (Lib)	Paul Maguire	
Nudgee	Labor	**Jack Melloy**	Alan Camp (Lib)	Gordon Blain	
Nundah	Liberal	Ian Brusasco	**William Knox** (Lib)	Ambrose Shannon	
Pine Rivers	Labor	Ken Leese	William Battershill (Lib); Allan Male (CP)	Brian Flynn	
Port Curtis	Labor	**Martin Hanson**		Marguerita Glen	
Redcliffe	Country	Jack Trueman	John Hodges (Lib); **Jim Houghton*** (CP)	Thomas Grundy	
Redlands	Labor	**Ted Baldwin**	Edward Fitzgerald (Lib); Dick Wood (CP)	Kenneth Bayliss	
Rockhampton	Labor	**Keith Wright**	Terence Molloy (CP); Rex Pilbeam (Lib)	Robert Bom	
Rockhampton North	Labor	Les Yewdale	Peter Vamvakaris (Lib)	John McKenna	**Merv Thackeray**
Roma	Country	Marcus Thew	**Ken Tomkins** (CP)	Patrick Feeney	
Salisbury	Labor	**Doug Sherrington**	Rosemary Kyburz (Lib)	Kenneth Wall	
Sandgate	Labor	**Harry Dean**	Ivan Brown (Lib)	Bernard Beston	
Sherwood	Liberal	Kerry Keating	**John Herbert** (Lib)	Clarice Weedon	
Somerset	Country	Henry Riis	Bill Gunn (CP)	Roland Forgan	Robert Wilkie
South Brisbane	Labor	**Fred Bromley**	Joseph Fenton (Lib)	Viliam Simek	**Col Bennett**; Anton Terpstra
South Coast	Country	Ronald Todd	Bruce Bishop (Lib); **Russ Hinze*** (CP)	Victor Kearney	Douglas Roughton
Stafford	Labor	Roy Harvey	Percy Smith (Lib)	James Hancock	
Surfers Paradise	Country	Keith Hunt	John McIlwain (Lib); Bruce Small* (CP)	Frederick Bassani	William Daniel; Eileen Peters
Toowong	Liberal	Donald Dignam	**Charles Porter** (Lib)	Brian O'Brien	
Toowoomba North	Labor	**Ray Bousen**	Nellie Robinson (CP); Athol Zerbst (Lib)	John Davis	
Toowoomba South	Labor	**Peter Wood**	Allison Dickson (Lib); John Peel (CP)	Francis Mullins	
Townsville	Liberal	Mike Reynolds	Owen Griffiths (CP); Norman Scott-Young* (Lib)	William Higgins	
Townsville South	Independent	Alex Wilson		Kerry Smith	**Tom Aikens**
Townsville West	Labor	**Perc Tucker**	Keith Rundle (Lib); Jean Thomas (CP)	Brian Hurney	
Warrego	Labor	**Jack Aiken**	John Nevell (CP)		
Warwick	Country	Raymond Lyons	**David Cory** (CP)	Daniel Skehan	Norman Stuart
Wavell	Liberal	Herbert Bromley	**Arthur Crawford** (Lib)	Peter Flanagan	
Whitsunday	Country	Graeme Bowen	**Ron Camm** (CP)	Bernard Lewis	
Windsor	Liberal	Bryan Walsh	**Bob Moore** (Lib)	Thomas Heike	
Wolston	Labor	**Evan Marginson**	Dirk Plooy (Lib)	Leonard Maguire	George Whyte
Wynnum	Labor	**Ted Harris**	Brian Cahill (Lib)	Gordon Randall	
Yeronga	Liberal	Clem Jones	**Norm Lee** (Lib)	Harry Wright	

== See also ==
- 1972 Queensland state election
- Members of the Queensland Legislative Assembly, 1969–1972
- Members of the Queensland Legislative Assembly, 1972–1974
- List of political parties in Australia
