= Electoral results for the district of Townsville West =

Queensland, Australia, district election results

This is a list of electoral results for the electoral district of Townsville West in Queensland state elections.

== Members for Townsville West ==
Member	Party	Term
Perc Tucker	Labor	1972–1974
Max Hooper	National	1974–1980
Geoff Smith	Labor	1980–1986

== Election results ==
=== Elections in the 1980s ===
1983 Queensland state election: Townsville West
Party	Candidate	Votes	%	±%
Labor	Geoff Smith	7,605	51.2	−1.3
National	Clifford Donohue	4,700	31.6	−13.5
Liberal	Leslie Tyrell	1,845	12.4	+12.4
Independent	Ron Aitken	709	4.8	+4.8
Total formal votes		14,859	98.7	+0.5
Informal votes		195	1.3	−0.5
Turnout		15,054	88.5	+1.6
Two-party-preferred result
Labor	Geoff Smith	8,372	56.3	+1.9
National	Clifford Donohue	6,487	43.7	−1.9
Labor hold		Swing	+1.9	

1980 Queensland state election: Townsville West
Party	Candidate	Votes	%	±%
Labor	Geoff Smith	7,356	52.5	+8.3
National	Max Hooper	6,321	45.1	+13.8
Communist	Frank Bishop	325	2.3	+2.3
Total formal votes		14,002	98.2	−0.7
Informal votes		263	1.8	+0.7
Turnout		14,265	86.9	−0.9
Two-party-preferred result
Labor	Geoff Smith	7,616	54.4	+5.3
National	Max Hooper	6,386	45.6	−5.3
Labor gain from National		Swing	+5.3	

=== Elections in the 1970s ===
1977 Queensland state election: Townsville West
Party	Candidate	Votes	%	±%
Labor	Geoff Smith	6,016	44.2	+1.4
National	Max Hooper	4,259	31.3	+18.0
Liberal	Fred Greensill	2,473	18.2	−5.3
Independent	Lilian Malcolm	873	6.4	+6.4
Total formal votes		13,621	98.9	
Informal votes		144	1.1	
Turnout		13,765	87.8	
Two-party-preferred result
National	Max Hooper	6,931	50.9	−5.0
Labor	Geoff Smith	6,690	49.1	+5.0
National hold		Swing	−5.0	

1974 Queensland state election: Townsville West
Party	Candidate	Votes	%	±%
Labor	Perc Tucker	5,318	42.8	−6.4
Liberal	Keith Rundle	2,926	23.5	−4.0
National	Max Hooper	1,652	13.3	+13.3
National	Bryan Newell	1,606	12.9	+12.9
Queensland Labor	Kiernan Dorney	926	7.4	−2.8
Total formal votes		12,428	98.7	0.0
Informal votes		163	1.3	0.0
Turnout		12,591	90.6	−1.1
Two-party-preferred result
National	Max Hooper	6,657	53.6	+5.8
Labor	Perc Tucker	5,771	46.4	−5.8
National gain from Labor		Swing	+5.8	

1972 Queensland state election: Townsville West
Party	Candidate	Votes	%	±%
Labor	Perc Tucker	5,526	49.2	+1.6
Liberal	Keith Rundle	3,091	27.5	+2.3
Country	Jean Thomas	1,477	13.1	−3.9
Queensland Labor	Brian Hurney	1,146	10.2	0.0
Total formal votes		11,240	98.7	
Informal votes		145	1.3	
Turnout		11,385	91.7	
Two-party-preferred result
Labor	Perc Tucker	5,862	52.2	+2.0
Liberal	Keith Rundle	5,378	47.8	−2.0
Labor hold		Swing	+2.0	
