= Electoral results for the district of Salisbury (Queensland) =

Queensland, Australia, district election results

This is a list of electoral results for the electoral district of Salisbury in Queensland state elections.

== Members for Salisbury ==
| Member | Party | Term |
|---|---|---|
| Doug Sherrington | Labor | 1960–1974 |
| Rosemary Kyburz | Liberal | 1974–1983 |
| Wayne Goss | Labor | 1983–1986 |
| Len Ardill | Labor | 1986–1992 |

== Election results ==
=== Elections in the 1980s ===
1989 Queensland state election: Salisbury
| Party | Candidate | Votes | % | ±% |
|---|---|---|---|---|
| Labor | Len Ardill | 13,379 | 57.6 | +12.3 |
| Liberal | Richard Iliff | 7,069 | 30.5 | +5.9 |
| National | Ross Adams | 2,762 | 11.9 | −18.2 |
| Total formal votes | | 23,210 | 97.3 | −0.8 |
| Informal votes | | 647 | 2.7 | +0.8 |
| Turnout | | 23,857 | 94.1 | +1.0 |
Two-party-preferred result
| Labor | Len Ardill | 13,578 | 58.5 | +7.1 |
| Liberal | Richard Iliff | 9,632 | 41.5 | +41.5 |
| Labor hold | | Swing | +7.1 | |

1986 Queensland state election: Salisbury
| Party | Candidate | Votes | % | ±% |
|---|---|---|---|---|
| Labor | Len Ardill | 8,957 | 45.3 | −1.1 |
| National | Gordon Fisher | 5,964 | 30.2 | −3.4 |
| Liberal | Richard Iliff | 4,855 | 24.6 | +4.7 |
| Total formal votes | | 19,776 | 98.1 | |
| Informal votes | | 388 | 1.9 | |
| Turnout | | 20,164 | 93.1 | |
Two-party-preferred result
| Labor | Len Ardill | 10,156 | 51.4 | +1.1 |
| National | Gordon Fisher | 9,620 | 48.6 | −1.1 |
| Labor hold | | Swing | +1.1 | |

1983 Queensland state election: Salisbury
| Party | Candidate | Votes | % | ±% |
|---|---|---|---|---|
| Labor | Wayne Goss | 9,245 | 46.4 | +1.4 |
| National | Gavan Duffy | 6,699 | 33.6 | +33.6 |
| Liberal | Rosemary Kyburz | 3,970 | 19.9 | −26.4 |
| Total formal votes | | 19,914 | 98.4 | +0.3 |
| Informal votes | | 314 | 1.6 | −0.3 |
| Turnout | | 20,228 | 92.6 | +3.4 |
Two-party-preferred result
| Labor | Wayne Goss | 10,183 | 51.1 | +3.4 |
| National | Gavan Duffy | 9,731 | 48.9 | +48.9 |
| Labor gain from Liberal | | Swing | +3.4 | |

1980 Queensland state election: Salisbury
| Party | Candidate | Votes | % | ±% |
|---|---|---|---|---|
| Liberal | Rosemary Kyburz | 7,949 | 46.3 | −4.4 |
| Labor | Bill Wilcox | 7,722 | 45.0 | −4.3 |
| Independent | Mary Ellwood | 1,496 | 8.7 | +8.7 |
| Total formal votes | | 17,167 | 98.1 | +0.4 |
| Informal votes | | 326 | 1.9 | −0.4 |
| Turnout | | 17,493 | 89.2 | −2.3 |
Two-party-preferred result
| Liberal | Rosemary Kyburz | 8,973 | 52.3 | +1.6 |
| Labor | Bill Wilcox | 8,194 | 47.7 | −1.6 |
| Liberal hold | | Swing | +1.6 | |

=== Elections in the 1970s ===
1977 Queensland state election: Salisbury
| Party | Candidate | Votes | % | ±% |
|---|---|---|---|---|
| Liberal | Rosemary Kyburz | 7,620 | 50.7 | +14.5 |
| Labor | William Wilcox | 7,406 | 49.3 | +6.0 |
| Total formal votes | | 15,026 | 97.7 | |
| Informal votes | | 360 | 2.3 | |
| Turnout | | 15,386 | 91.5 | |
| Liberal hold | | Swing | −7.8 | |

1974 Queensland state election: Salisbury
| Party | Candidate | Votes | % | ±% |
|---|---|---|---|---|
| Labor | Bill Wilcox | 7,824 | 43.3 | −21.7 |
| Liberal | Rosemary Kyburz | 6,559 | 36.2 | +11.4 |
| National | Leonard Spies | 3,194 | 17.9 | +17.9 |
| Queensland Labor | Miroslav Jansky | 515 | 2.9 | −7.3 |
| Total formal votes | | 18,092 | 97.5 | −1.0 |
| Informal votes | | 468 | 2.5 | +1.0 |
| Turnout | | 18,560 | 86.5 | −5.7 |
Two-party-preferred result
| Liberal | Rosemary Kyburz | 10,019 | 55.4 | +22.1 |
| Labor | Bill Wilcox | 8,073 | 44.6 | −22.1 |
| Liberal gain from Labor | | Swing | +22.1 | |

1972 Queensland state election: Salisbury
| Party | Candidate | Votes | % | ±% |
|---|---|---|---|---|
| Labor | Doug Sherrington | 8,447 | 65.0 | −4.5 |
| Liberal | Rosemary Kyburz | 3,226 | 24.8 | −2.0 |
| Queensland Labor | Kenneth Wall | 1,328 | 10.2 | +6.5 |
| Total formal votes | | 13,001 | 98.5 | |
| Informal votes | | 194 | 1.5 | |
| Turnout | | 13,195 | 92.2 | |
Two-party-preferred result
| Labor | Doug Sherrington | 8,671 | 66.7 | −1.5 |
| Liberal | Rosemary Kyburz | 4,330 | 33.3 | +1.5 |
| Labor hold | | Swing | −1.5 | |

=== Elections in the 1960s ===
1969 Queensland state election: Salisbury
| Party | Candidate | Votes | % | ±% |
|---|---|---|---|---|
| Labor | Doug Sherrington | 12,756 | 69.5 | +0.2 |
| Liberal | George Whyte | 4,922 | 26.8 | −3.9 |
| Queensland Labor | Miroslav Jansky | 679 | 3.7 | +3.7 |
| Total formal votes | | 18,357 | 98.0 | +0.1 |
| Informal votes | | 367 | 2.0 | −0.1 |
| Turnout | | 18,724 | 90.5 | −1.9 |
Two-party-preferred result
| Labor | Doug Sherrington | 12,942 | 70.5 | +1.2 |
| Liberal | George Whyte | 5,415 | 29.5 | −1.2 |
| Labor hold | | Swing | +1.2 | |

1966 Queensland state election: Salisbury
| Party | Candidate | Votes | % | ±% |
|---|---|---|---|---|
| Labor | Doug Sherrington | 11,484 | 69.3 | +4.7 |
| Liberal | Keith Brough | 5,097 | 30.7 | 0.0 |
| Total formal votes | | 16,581 | 97.9 | +0.2 |
| Informal votes | | 361 | 2.1 | −0.2 |
| Turnout | | 16,942 | 92.4 | −2.1 |
| Labor hold | | Swing | +3.8 | |

1963 Queensland state election: Salisbury
| Party | Candidate | Votes | % | ±% |
|---|---|---|---|---|
| Labor | Doug Sherrington | 8,690 | 64.6 | +8.9 |
| Liberal | Keith Brough | 4,124 | 30.7 | −0.8 |
| Queensland Labor | Miroslav Jansky | 631 | 4.7 | −6.9 |
| Total formal votes | | 13,445 | 97.7 | −0.8 |
| Informal votes | | 309 | 2.3 | +0.8 |
| Turnout | | 13,754 | 94.5 | +2.5 |
Two-party-preferred result
| Labor | Doug Sherrington | 8,807 | 65.5 | |
| Liberal | Keith Brough | 4,648 | 34.5 | |
| Labor hold | | Swing | N/A | |

1960 Queensland state election: Salisbury
| Party | Candidate | Votes | % | ±% |
|---|---|---|---|---|
| Labor | Doug Sherrington | 6,243 | 55.7 | |
| Liberal | Norman Edwards | 3,530 | 31.5 | |
| Queensland Labor | William Tresillian | 1,299 | 11.6 | |
| Communist | Walter Stubbins | 141 | 1.3 | |
| Total formal votes | | 11,213 | 98.5 | |
| Informal votes | | 169 | 1.5 | |
| Turnout | | 11,382 | 92.0 | |
| Labor win | | (new seat) | | |
