= Electoral results for the district of Belmont (Queensland) =

Queensland, Australia, district election results

This is a list of electoral results for the electoral district of Belmont in Queensland state elections.

== Members for Belmont ==
Member	Party	Term
Fred Newton	Labor	1960–1974
David Byrne	Liberal	1974–1977

== Election results ==
=== Elections in the 1970s ===
1974 Queensland state election: Belmont
Party	Candidate	Votes	%	±%
Liberal	David Byrne	6,974	53.6	+25.5
Labor	Fred Newton	6,044	46.4	−17.5
Total formal votes		13,018	98.6	+0.1
Informal votes		183	1.4	−0.1
Turnout		13,201	90.7	−3.7
Liberal gain from Labor		Swing	+18.5	

1972 Queensland state election: Belmont
Party	Candidate	Votes	%	±%
Labor	Fred Newton	7,350	63.9	+6.4
Liberal	Maurice Hughes	3,229	28.1	−6.3
Queensland Labor	Thomas Connor	924	8.0	+0.9
Total formal votes		11,503	98.5	
Informal votes		169	1.5	
Turnout		11,672	94.4	
Two-party-preferred result
Labor	Fred Newton	7,463	64.9	+3.8
Liberal	Maurice Hughes	4,040	35.1	−3.8
Labor hold		Swing	+3.8	

=== Elections in the 1960s ===
1969 Queensland state election: Belmont
Party	Candidate	Votes	%	±%
Labor	Fred Newton	10,399	57.5	−0.5
Liberal	Cyril Morgan	6,405	34.4	−1.4
Queensland Labor	John Taylor	1,285	7.1	+0.9
Total formal votes		18,089	98.0	−0.2
Informal votes		364	2.0	+0.2
Turnout		18,453	93.3	−0.8
Two-party-preferred result
Labor	Fred Newton	10,638	58.8	−1.3
Liberal	Cyril Morgan	7,451	41.2	+1.3
Labor hold		Swing	−1.3	

1966 Queensland state election: Belmont
Party	Candidate	Votes	%	±%
Labor	Fred Newton	8,898	58.0	−1.3
Liberal	Oswald Brunner	5,494	35.8	+1.1
Queensland Labor	John Taylor	951	6.2	+0.2
Total formal votes		15,343	98.2	+0.1
Informal votes		280	1.8	−0.1
Turnout		15,623	94.1	−1.0
Two-party-preferred result
Labor	Fred Newton	9,075	60.1	+0.3
Liberal	Oswald Brunner	6,268	39.9	−0.3
Labor hold		Swing	+0.3	

1963 Queensland state election: Belmont
Party	Candidate	Votes	%	±%
Labor	Fred Newton	7,846	59.3	+4.6
Liberal	Cecil Schuurs	4,593	34.7	+0.2
Queensland Labor	John Taylor	790	6.0	−4.8
Total formal votes		13,229	98.1	−0.3
Informal votes		253	1.9	+0.3
Turnout		13,482	95.1	+2.3
Two-party-preferred result
Labor	Fred Newton	7,993	60.4	
Liberal	Cecil Schuurs	5,236	39.6	
Labor hold		Swing	N/A	

1960 Queensland state election: Belmont
Party	Candidate	Votes	%	±%
Labor	Fred Newton	6,120	54.7	+9.1
Liberal	Bill Hewitt	3,869	34.5	−1.6
Queensland Labor	Jean Reville	1,209	10.8	−5.0
Total formal votes		11,198	98.4	
Informal votes		180	1.6	
Turnout		11,378	92.8	
Labor hold		Swing	+5.5	
