= Members of the Queensland Legislative Assembly, 1972–1974 =

This is a list of members of the 40th Legislative Assembly of Queensland from 1972 to 1974, as elected at the 1972 state election held on 27 May 1972.

Name	Party	Electorate	Term in office
Mike Ahern	Country/National	Landsborough	1968–1990
Jack Aiken	Labor	Warrego	1969–1974
Tom Aikens	North Queensland Party	Townsville South	1944–1977
Gilbert Alison	Liberal	Maryborough	1971–1977, 1983–1989
Roy Armstrong	Country/National	Mulgrave	1960–1980
Ted Baldwin	Labor	Redlands	1969–1974
Val Bird	Country/National	Burdekin	1969–1983
Hon Joh Bjelke-Petersen	Country/National	Barambah	1947–1987
Jim Blake	Labor	Isis	1968–1974, 1977–1983
Ray Bousen	Labor	Toowoomba North	1969–1974
Fred Bromley	Labor	South Brisbane	1960–1974
Tom Burns	Labor	Lytton	1972–1996
Hon Ron Camm	Country/National	Whitsunday	1961–1980
Hon Fred Campbell	Liberal	Aspley	1960–1980
Ed Casey	Independent	Mackay	1969–1995
Hon Sir Gordon Chalk	Liberal	Lockyer	1947–1976
Geoff Chinchen	Liberal	Mount Gravatt	1963–1977
David Cory	Country/National	Warwick	1963–1977
Dr Arthur Crawford	Liberal	Wavell	1969–1977
Bill D'Arcy	Labor	Albert	1972–1974, 1977–2000
Brian Davis	Labor	Brisbane	1969–1974, 1977–1989
Harry Dean	Labor	Sandgate	1960–1977
Dr Llewellyn Edwards	Liberal	Ipswich	1972–1983
Hon Sir Alan Fletcher	Country/National	Cunningham	1953–1974
Des Frawley	Country/National	Murrumba	1972–1983
Bill Gunn	Country/National	Somerset	1972–1992
Pat Hanlon	Labor	Baroona	1956–1974
Martin Hanson	Labor	Port Curtis	1963–1976
Ted Harris	Labor	Wynnum	1966–1974
Lindsay Hartwig	Country/National	Callide	1972–1986
Roy Harvey	Labor	Stafford	1972–1974
Hon John Herbert	Liberal	Sherwood	1956–1978
Hon Nev Hewitt	Country/National	Auburn	1956–1980
Bill Hewitt	Liberal	Chatsworth	1966–1983
Hon Russ Hinze	Country/National	South Coast	1966–1988
Hon Max Hodges	Country/National	Gympie	1957–1979
Hon Keith Hooper	Liberal	Greenslopes	1957–1977
Kevin Hooper	Labor	Archerfield	1972–1984
Jim Houghton	Country/National	Redcliffe	1960–1979
Jack Houston	Labor	Bulimba	1957–1980
Clive Hughes	Liberal	Kurilpa	1960–1974
Alec Inch	Labor	Mount Isa	1960–1974
Lou Jensen	Labor	Bundaberg	1969–1977
Gerry Jones	Labor	Everton	1972–1974
Ray Jones	Labor	Cairns	1965–1983
Vi Jordan	Labor	Ipswich West	1966–1974
Bill Kaus	Liberal	Mansfield	1966–1986
Hon William Knox	Liberal	Nundah	1957–1989
Don Lane	Liberal	Merthyr	1971–1989
Norm Lee	Liberal	Yeronga	1964–1989
Kenneth Leese	Liberal	Pine Rivers	1972–1974
Bill Lickiss	Liberal	Mount Coot-tha	1963–1989
Hon Bill Longeran	Country/National	Flinders	1957–1958, 1958–1974
David Low	Country/National	Cooroora	1947–1974
Evan Marginson	Labor	Wolston	1969–1977
Hon Henry McKechnie	Country/National	Carnarvon	1963–1974
Jack Melloy	Labor	Nudgee	1960–1977
Col Miller	Liberal	Ithaca	1966–1986
Bob Moore	Liberal	Windsor	1969–1983
Peter Moore	Labor	Mourilyan	1969–1974
Selwyn Muller	Country/National	Fassifern	1969–1983
John Murray	Liberal	Clayfield	1963–1976
Don Neal	Country/National	Balonne	1972–1992
Tom Newbery	Country/National	Mirani	1965–1980
Fred Newton	Labor	Belmont	1960–1974
Eugene O'Donnell	Labor	Belyando	1961–1974
Charles Porter	Liberal	Toowong	1966–1980
Hon Wally Rae	Country/National	Gregory	1957–1974
Ted Row	Country/National	Hinchinbrook	1972–1989
Dr Norman Scott-Young	Liberal	Townsville	1972–1983
Doug Sherrington	Labor	Salisbury	1960–1974
Bruce Small	Country/National	Surfers Paradise	1972–1977
Hon Vic Sullivan	Country/National	Condamine	1960–1983
Ken Tomkins	Country/National	Roma	1967–1983
Hon Douglas Tooth	Liberal	Ashgrove	1957–1974
Perc Tucker	Labor	Townsville West	1960–1974
Edwin Wallis-Smith	Labor	Cook	1963–1974
Claude Wharton	Country/National	Burnett	1960–1986
Bill Wood	Labor	Barron River	1969–1974
Peter Wood	Labor	Toowoomba South	1966–1974
Keith Wright	Labor	Rockhampton	1969–1984
Les Yewdale	Labor	Rockhampton North	1972–1989

^{1} The Country Party changed its name to the National Party on 6 April 1974.

== See also ==
- 1972 Queensland state election
- Premier: Joh Bjelke-Petersen (National Party) (1968–1987)
