= Electoral results for the district of Townsville East =

Queensland, Australia, district election results

This is a list of electoral results for the electoral district of Townsville East in Queensland state elections.

== Members for Townsville East ==
| Member | Party | Term |
|---|---|---|
| Geoff Smith | Labor | 1986–1992 |

== Election results ==
=== Elections in the 1980s ===
1989 Queensland state election: Townsville East
| Party | Candidate | Votes | % | ±% |
|---|---|---|---|---|
| Labor | Geoff Smith | 11,009 | 61.8 | +8.8 |
| National | Dickway Goon Chew | 4,487 | 25.2 | −5.8 |
| Liberal | Susanne Luckel | 2,313 | 13.0 | −2.9 |
| Total formal votes | | 17,809 | 97.0 | −1.1 |
| Informal votes | | 555 | 3.0 | +1.1 |
| Turnout | | 18,364 | 89.0 | +0.1 |
Two-party-preferred result
| Labor | Geoff Smith | 11,451 | 64.3 | +6.8 |
| National | Dickway Goon Chew | 6,358 | 35.7 | −6.8 |
| Labor hold | | Swing | +6.8 | |

1986 Queensland state election: Townsville East
| Party | Candidate | Votes | % | ±% |
|---|---|---|---|---|
| Labor | Geoff Smith | 8,936 | 53.0 | |
| National | Dickway Goon Chew | 5,234 | 31.1 | |
| Liberal | Vincent Nielsen | 2,686 | 15.9 | |
| Total formal votes | | 16,856 | 98.1 | |
| Informal votes | | 332 | 1.9 | |
| Turnout | | 17,188 | 88.9 | |
Two-party-preferred result
| Labor | Geoff Smith | 9,692 | 57.5 | −2.4 |
| National | Dickway Goon Chew | 7,164 | 42.5 | +2.4 |
| Labor hold | | Swing | −2.4 | |
