= Electoral results for the district of Townsville North =

Queensland, Australia, district election results

This is a list of electoral results for the electoral district of Townsville North in Queensland state elections.

== Members for Townsville North ==
Member	Party	Term
Perc Tucker	Labor	1960–1972

== Election results ==
=== Elections in the 1960s ===
1969 Queensland state election: Townsville North
Party	Candidate	Votes	%	±%
Labor	Perc Tucker	6,977	47.6	−2.6
Liberal	Keith Rundle	3,695	25.2	−10.8
Country	Owen Griffiths	2,488	17.0	+17.0
Queensland Labor	Peter Flanagan	1,495	10.2	−3.7
Total formal votes		14,655	98.6	−0.3
Informal votes		208	1.4	+0.3
Turnout		14,863	88.3	−3.5
Two-party-preferred result
Labor	Perc Tucker	7,436	50.7	−2.0
Liberal	Keith Rundle	7,219	49.3	+2.0
Labor hold		Swing	−2.0	

1966 Queensland state election: Townsville North
Party	Candidate	Votes	%	±%
Labor	Perc Tucker	6,862	50.2	+1.8
Liberal	Robert Bonnett	4,919	36.0	+7.6
Queensland Labor	J.J. McManus	1,895	13.9	−8.7
Total formal votes		13,676	98.9	+0.2
Informal votes		154	1.1	−0.2
Turnout		13,830	91.8	−1.8
Two-party-preferred result
Labor	Perc Tucker	7,214	52.7	−0.5
Liberal	Robert Bonnett	6,464	47.3	+0.5
Labor hold		Swing	−0.5	

1963 Queensland state election: Townsville North
Party	Candidate	Votes	%	±%
Labor	Perc Tucker	6,196	48.4	+5.0
Liberal	Robert Bonnett	3,639	28.4	−5.7
Queensland Labor	Kiernan Dorney	2,896	22.6	+9.0
Independent	Alfred Reeves	66	0.5	+0.5
Total formal votes		12,797	98.7	+0.1
Informal votes		163	1.3	−0.1
Turnout		12,960	93.6	+0.7
Two-party-preferred result
Labor	Perc Tucker	6,806	53.2	
Liberal	Robert Bonnett	5,991	46.8	
Labor hold		Swing	N/A	

1960 Queensland state election: Townsville North
Party	Candidate	Votes	%	±%
Labor	Perc Tucker	5,262	43.4	
Liberal	Roy Annable	4,140	34.1	
Queensland Labor	Ronald Comerford	1,655	13.6	
Independent	Archibald Hooper	871	7.2	
Communist	P.F. Bishop	208	1.7	
Total formal votes		12,136	98.6	
Informal votes		166	1.4	
Turnout		12,302	92.9	
Labor win		(new seat)		
