= 1972 Queensland state election =

← 1969	27 May 1972	1974 →

All 82 seats in the Legislative Assembly of Queensland 42 Assembly seats were needed for a majority
- Turnout: 92.41 (▲0.64 pp)
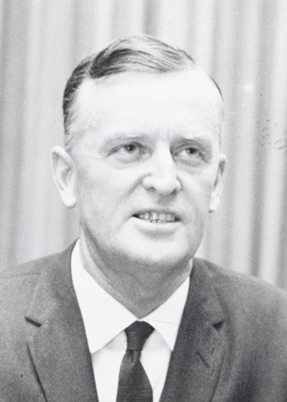

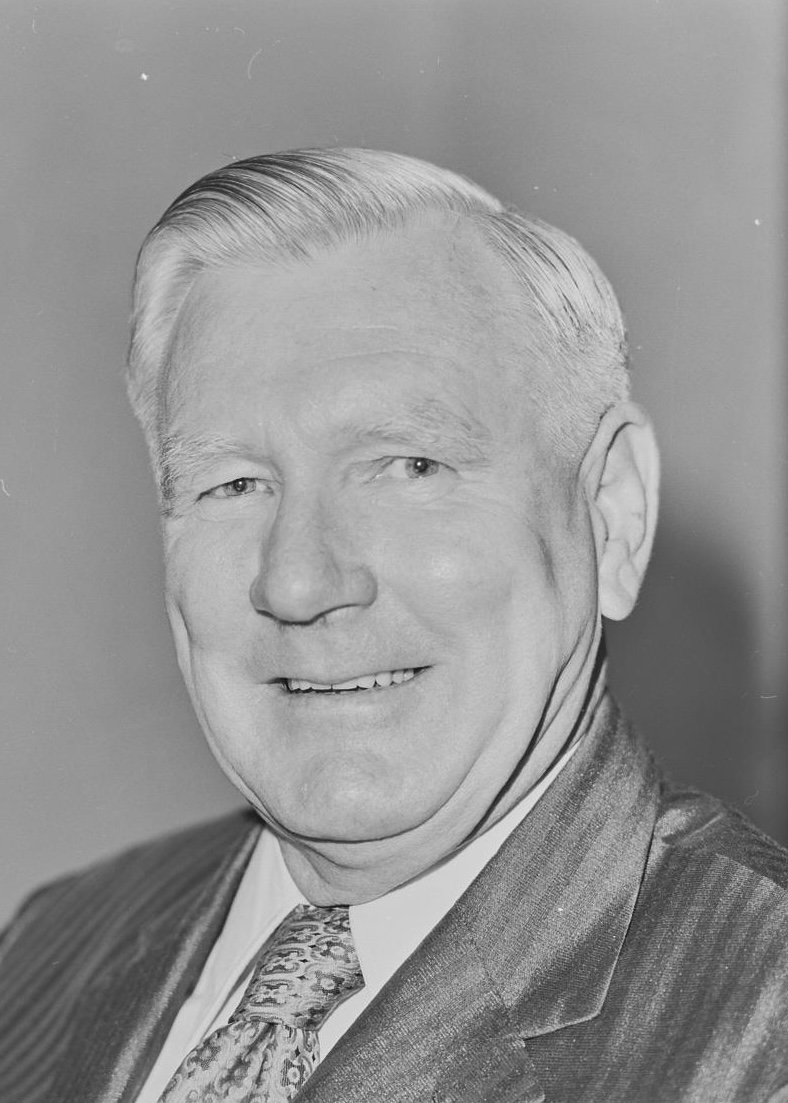
	First party	Second party	Third party
			QLP
Leader	Joh Bjelke-Petersen	Jack Houston	No leader
Party	Country–Liberal Coalition	Labor	Queensland Labor
Leader since	8 August 1968	12 October 1966
Leader's seat	Barambah	Bulimba
Last election	45 seats, 44.70%	31 seats, 44.99%	1 seat, 7.24%
Seats won	47	33	0
Seat change	▲2	▲2	▼1
Popular vote	383,000	424,002	69,757
Percentage	42.23%	46.75%	7.69%
Swing	▼2.47	▲1.76	▲0.46
- Winning margin by electorate.
Premier before election
Joh Bjelke-Petersen
Country–Liberal Coalition
Elected Premier
Joh Bjelke-Petersen
Country–Liberal Coalition

Elections were held in the Australian state of Queensland on 27 May 1972 to elect the 82 members of the Legislative Assembly of Queensland.

The Country-Liberal Coalition won its sixth consecutive victory since it won government in 1957 and also its second victory under Joh Bjelke-Petersen.

== Key dates ==
Date	Event
18 April 1972	The Legislative Assembly was dissolved.
18 April 1972	Writs were issued by the Governor to proceed with an election.
27 April 1972	Close of nominations.
27 May 1972	Polling day, between the hours of 8am and 6pm.
20 June 1972	The Bjelke-Petersen Ministry was reconstituted.
24 June 1972	The writ was returned and the results formally declared.
10 July 1972	Deadline for return of the writs.
1 August 1972	Parliament resumed for business.

== Results ==
Queensland state election, 27 May 1972 Legislative Assembly << 1969–1974 >>
Enrolled voters	997,489				
Votes cast	921,763		Turnout	92.41%	+0.64%
Informal votes	15,566		Informal	1.61%	–0.18%
Summary of votes by party
Party	Primary votes	%	Swing	Seats	Change
Labor	424,002	46.75%	+1.76%	33	+2
Liberal	201,596	22.23%	–1.45%	21	+2
Country	181,404	20.00%	–1.02%	26	±0
Queensland Labor	69,757	7.69%	+0.46%	0	–1
Independent	30,187	3.33%	+0.48%	2	+1
Total	906,946			82	

Popular vote
Labor	46.75%
Liberal	22.23%
Country	20.00%
Democratic Labor	7.69%
Independents	3.33%

Seats
Labor	40.24%
Country	31.71%
Liberal	25.61%
Independents	2.44%

== Seats changing hands ==
Seat	Pre-1972			Swing	Post-1972		
Seat	Party	Member	Margin	Swing	Margin	Member	Party
Albert ¶	Liberal	Bill Heatley*	0.5	–4.6	4.1	Bill D'Arcy	Labor
Ipswich	Labor	notional – new seat	4.5	–5.7	1.2	Llew Edwards	Liberal
Mackay	Labor	Ed Casey	6.7	–20.1	13.4	Ed Casey	Independent

- ¶ Results for Albert based on 1970 by-election
- Bill Heatley died in October 1971, but no by-election was called due to the proximity of the 1972 election.
- In addition, the Liberal Party retained Maryborough, which was won from Labor at the 1971 by-election.
- Aubigny, which was the last seat held by the Democratic Labor Party, was abolished at this election and its outgoing member, Les Diplock, retired.

== Post-election pendulum ==
Country/Liberal seats (47)
Marginal
Murrumba	Des Frawley	CP	1.0%
Ipswich	Llew Edwards	LIB	1.2%
Kurilpa	Clive Hughes	LIB	1.5%
Condamine	Vic Sullivan	CP	1.8% v IND
Mansfield	Bill Kaus	LIB	2.0%
Wavell	Arthur Crawford	LIB	2.0%
Hinchinbrook	Ted Row	CP	2.5%
Mount Gravatt	Geoff Chinchen	CP	2.5%
Gregory	Wally Rae	CP	2.6%
Maryborough	Gilbert Alison	LIB	3.8%
Nundah	William Knox	LIB	3.9%
Yeronga	Norm Lee	LIB	4.3%
Ashgrove	Douglas Tooth	LIB	4.8%
Greenslopes	Keith Hooper	LIB	5.0%
Chatsworth	Bill Hewitt	LIB	5.1%
Windsor	Bob Moore	LIB	5.1%
Redcliffe	Jim Houghton	CP	5.4%
Ithaca	Col Miller	LIB	5.6%
Carnarvon	Henry McKechnie	CP	5.9%
Fairly safe
Whitsunday	Ron Camm	CP	6.9%
Clayfield	John Murray	LIB	8.2%
Aspley	Fred Campbell	LIB	8.3%
Mulgrave	Roy Armstrong	CP	8.4%
Merthyr	Don Lane	LIB	9.1%
Burdekin	Val Bird	CP	9.2%
Surfers Paradise	Bruce Small	CP	9.6%
Flinders	Bill Longeran	CP	9.7%
Gympie	Max Hodges	CP	9.7%
Sherwood	John Herbert	LIB	9.8%
Safe
Callide	Lindsay Hartwig	CP	10.3%
Townsville	Norman Scott-Young	LIB	11.5%
Warwick	David Cory	CP	11.5%
South Coast	Russ Hinze	CP	11.7%
Mirani	Tom Newbery	CP	12.1%
Lockyer	Gordon Chalk	LIB	12.2%
Toowong	Charles Porter	LIB	13.0%
Auburn	Neville Hewitt	CP	13.4%
Roma	Ken Tomkins	CP	14.0%
Balonne	Don Neal	CP	15.6%
Fassifern	Selwyn Muller	CP	15.7%
Landsborough	Michael Ahern	CP	15.7%
Cooroora	David Low	CP	15.8%
Mount Coot-tha	Bill Lickiss	LIB	16.0%
Somerset	Bill Gunn	CP	16.3%
Very safe
Burnett	Claude Wharton	CP	20.5%
Barambah	Joh Bjelke-Petersen	CP	23.7%
Cunningham	Alan Fletcher	CP	26.4%

Labor seats (33)
Marginal
Rockhampton North	Les Yewdale	ALP	1.1%
Belyando	Eugene O'Donnell	ALP	1.3%
Stafford	Roy Harvey	ALP	1.6%
Townsville West	Perc Tucker	ALP	2.2%
Barron River	Bill Wood	ALP	3.4%
Albert	Bill D'Arcy	ALP	4.1%
Cook	Edwin Wallis-Smith	ALP	4.2%
Redlands	Ted Baldwin	ALP	5.1%
Rockhampton	Keith Wright	ALP	5.9%
Fairly safe
Pine Rivers	Kenneth Leese	ALP	6.8%
Toowoomba South	Peter Wood	ALP	6.9%
Mourilyan	Peter Moore	ALP	7.2%
Everton	Gerry Jones	ALP	8.3%
Isis	Jim Blake	ALP	8.3%
Brisbane	Brian Davis	ALP	9.7%
Safe
South Brisbane	Fred Bromley	ALP	11.0%
Ipswich West	Vi Jordan	ALP	11.5%
Warrego	Jack Aiken	ALP	13.4%
Sandgate	Harold Dean	ALP	13.6%
Baroona	Pat Hanlon	ALP	14.1%
Wynnum	Edward Harris	ALP	14.5%
Belmont	Fred Newton	ALP	14.5%
Toowoomba North	Ray Bousen	ALP	14.9%
Nudgee	Jack Melloy	ALP	15.4%
Bulimba	Jack Houston	ALP	15.6%
Mount Isa	Alex Inch	ALP	16.4%
Salisbury	Doug Sherrington	ALP	16.7%
Cairns	Ray Jones	ALP	18.8%
Bundaberg	Lou Jensen	ALP	18.9% v DLP
Lytton	Tom Burns	ALP	19.3%
Very safe
Wolston	Evan Marginson	ALP	20.3%
Archerfield	Kevin Hooper	ALP	23.3%
Port Curtis	Martin Hanson	ALP	32.2% v DLP
Crossbench seats (2)
Townsville South	Tom Aikens	IND	7.6% v ALP
Mackay	Ed Casey	IND	13.4% v ALP

== See also ==
- Members of the Queensland Legislative Assembly, 1969–1972
- Members of the Queensland Legislative Assembly, 1972–1974
- Candidates of the Queensland state election, 1972
- Bjelke-Petersen Ministry
