= 1974 Queensland state election =

← 1972	7 December 1974	1977 →

All 82 seats in the Legislative Assembly of Queensland 42 Assembly seats were needed for a majority
- Turnout: 89.42 (▼2.99 pp)
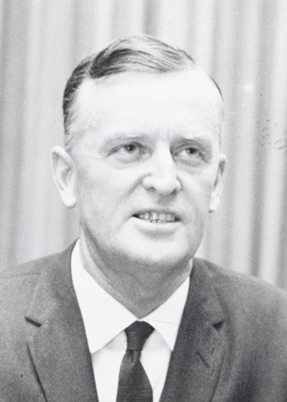

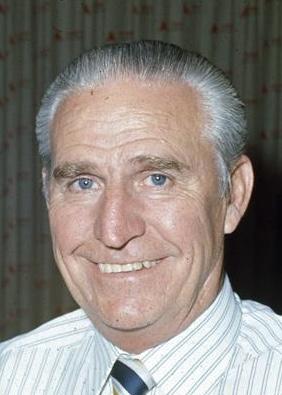
	First party	Second party
Leader	Joh Bjelke-Petersen	Perc Tucker
Party	National–Liberal Coalition	Labor
Leader since	8 August 1968	1 July 1974
Leader's seat	Barambah	Townsville West (lost seat)
Last election	47 seats, 42.23%	33 seats, 46.75%
Seats won	69	11
Seat change	▲22	▼22
Popular vote	615,770	376,187
Percentage	58.97%	36.03%
Swing	▲16.75	▼10.72
- Winning margin by electorate.
Premier before election
Joh Bjelke-Petersen
National–Liberal Coalition
Elected Premier
Joh Bjelke-Petersen
National–Liberal Coalition

Elections were held in the Australian state of Queensland on 7 December 1974 to elect the 82 members of the Legislative Assembly of Queensland.

The National–Liberal Coalition won a third consecutive victory under Joh Bjelke-Petersen, and the seventh consecutive victory for the National Party in Queensland, which had renamed itself from the Country Party since the previous election. The Labor Party lost two-thirds of its seats, including that of leader Perc Tucker, its worst showing in an election until 2012 and thus a landslide victory for the Coalition.

Labor was reduced to only 11 seats, leading observers to call Labor's caucus a "cricket team." William Bowe of Crikey wrote that for years, the election stood as "the gold standard for Australian election massacres".

== Key dates ==
Date	Event
23 October 1974	Premier Joh Bjelke-Petersen announced the early election date at a news conference.
2 November 1974	The Legislative Assembly was dissolved.
2 November 1974	Writs were issued by the Governor to proceed with an election.
8 November 1974	Close of nominations.
7 December 1974	Polling day, between the hours of 8am and 6pm.
23 December 1974	The Bjelke-Petersen Ministry was reconstituted.
11 January 1975	The writ was returned and the results formally declared.
3 February 1975	Deadline for return of the writs.
25 February 1975	Parliament resumed for business.

== Results ==
Queensland state election, 7 December 1974 Legislative Assembly << 1972–1977 >>
Enrolled voters	1,186,378				
Votes cast	1,060,910		Turnout	89.42%	-2.99%
Informal votes	16,742		Informal	1.58%	+0.05%
Summary of votes by party
Party	Primary votes	%	Swing	Seats	Change
Labor	376,187	36.03%	-10.72%	11	–22
Liberal	324,682	31.09%	+8.87%	30	+9
Nationals	291,088	27.88%	+7.88%	39	+13
Independent	29,582	2.83%	-0.49%	2	±0
Queensland Labor	19,952	1.91%	-5.78%	0	±0
Australia	1,929	0.18%	+0.18%	0	±0
Australian Advancement	416	0.04%	+0.04%	0	±0
Socialist	332	0.03%	+0.03%	0	±0
Total	1,044,168			82	

Popular vote
Labor	36.03%
Liberal	31.09%
Nationals	27.88%
Democratic Labor	1.91%
Australia	0.18%
Independents	2.83%
Others	0.07%

Seats
Nationals	47.56%
Liberal	36.59%
Labor	13.41%
Independents	2.44%

== Seats changing hands ==
Seat	Pre-1974			Swing	Post-1974		
Seat	Party	Member	Margin	Swing	Margin	Member	Party
Albert	Labor	Bill D'Arcy	4.1	–14.2	10.1	Ivan Gibbs	National
Baroona	Labor	Pat Hanlon	14.1	–15.8	1.7	Dennis Young	Liberal
Barron River	Labor	Bill Wood	3.4	–4.1	0.7	Martin Tenni	National
Belmont	Labor	Fred Newton	14.9	–18.5	3.6	David Byrne	Liberal
Belyando	Labor	Eugene O'Donnell	1.3	–8.7	7.4	Vince Lester	National
Brisbane	Labor	Brian Davis	9.7	–10.9	1.2	Harold Lowes	Liberal
Cook	Labor	Bob Scott	4.2	–6.8	2.6	Eric Deeral	National
Everton	Labor	Gerry Jones	8.3	–11.0	2.7	Brian Lindsay	Liberal
Ipswich West	Labor	Vi Jordan	11.5	–12.0	0.5	Albert Hales	National
Isis	Labor	Jim Blake	8.3	–12.4	4.1	Lin Powell	National
Mount Isa	Labor	Alex Inch	16.4	–19.9	3.5	Angelo Bertoni	National
Mourilyan	Labor	Peter Moore	7.2	–8.9	1.7	Vicky Kippin	National
Pine Rivers	Labor	Kenneth Leese	6.8	–18.7	11.9	Rob Akers	Liberal
Redlands	Labor	Ted Baldwin	5.1	–14.8	9.7	John Goleby	National
Salisbury	Labor	Doug Sherrington	16.7	–22.1	5.4	Rosemary Kyburz	Liberal
South Brisbane	Labor	Fred Bromley	11.0	–16.0	5.0	Colin Lamont	Liberal
Stafford	Labor	Roy Harvey	11.0	–16.0	5.0	Terry Gygar	Liberal
Toowoomba North	Labor	Ray Bousen	14.9	–17.2	2.3	John Lockwood	Liberal
Toowoomba South	Labor	Peter Wood	6.9	–14.6	7.7	John Warner	National
Townsville West	Labor	Perc Tucker	2.2	–5.8	3.6	Max Hooper	National
Warrego	Labor	Jack Aiken	13.4	–14.4	1.0	Neil Turner	National
Wynnum	Labor	Edward Harris	14.5	–14.6	0.1	Bill Lamond	National

- Members listed in italics did not recontest their seats.

== Post-election pendulum ==
National/Liberal seats (69)
Marginal
Wynnum	Bill Lamond	NAT	0.1%
Ipswich West	Albert Hales	NAT	0.5%
Barron River	Martin Tenni	NAT	0.7%
Warrego	Neil Turner	NAT	1.0%
Brisbane	Harold Lowes	LIB	1.2%
Baroona	Dennis Young	LIB	1.7%
Mourilyan	Vicky Kippin	NAT	1.7%
Cooroora	Gordon Simpson	NAT	2.1% v LIB
Toowoomba North	John Lockwood	LIB	2.3%
Cook	Eric Deeral	NAT	2.6%
Everton	Brian Lindsay	LIB	2.7%
Mount Isa	Angelo Bertoni	NAT	3.5%
Belmont	David Byrne	LIB	3.6%
Townsville West	Max Hooper	NAT	3.6%
Isis	Lin Powell	NAT	4.1%
South Brisbane	Colin Lamont	LIB	5.0%
Salisbury	Rosemary Kyburz	LIB	5.4%
Maryborough	Gilbert Alison	LIB	5.9%
Fairly safe
Belyando	Vince Lester	NAT	7.4%
Toowoomba South	John Warner	NAT	7.7%
Redlands	John Goleby	NAT	9.7%
Safe
Albert	Ivan Gibbs	NAT	10.1%
Hinchinbrook	Ted Row	NAT	10.4%
Kurilpa	Sam Doumany	LIB	11.0%
Stafford	Terry Gygar	LIB	11.7%
Pine Rivers	Rob Akers	LIB	11.9%
Gregory	Bill Glasson	NAT	12.0%
Redcliffe	Jim Houghton	NAT	12.1%
Whitsunday	Ron Camm	NAT	12.2%
Murrumba	Des Frawley	NAT	13.7%
Flinders	Bob Katter	NAT	13.8%
Nundah	William Knox	LIB	13.8%
Mulgrave	Roy Armstrong	NAT	14.8%
Ithaca	Col Miller	LIB	15.4%
Wavell	Arthur Crawford	LIB	15.4%
Windsor	Bob Moore	LIB	15.7%
Merthyr	Don Lane	LIB	16.6%
Townsville	Norman Scott-Young	LIB	17.0%
Chatsworth	Bill Hewitt	LIB	17.7%
South Coast	Russ Hinze	NAT	17.7%
Yeronga	Norm Lee	LIB	17.9%
Ashgrove	John Greenwood	LIB	18.5%
Clayfield	John Murray	LIB	18.5%
Mount Gravatt	Geoff Chinchen	LIB	19.0%
Ipswich	Llewellyn Edwards	LIB	19.1%
Mirani	Tom Newbery	NAT	19.6%
Very safe
Greenslopes	Keith Hooper	LIB	20.2%
Burdekin	Val Bird	NAT	20.3%
Callide	Lindsay Hartwig	NAT	20.8%
Carnarvon	Peter McKechnie	NAT	21.6%
Toowong	Charles Porter	LIB	21.6%
Mansfield	Bill Kaus	LIB	22.2%
Surfers Paradise	Bruce Small	NAT	22.5%
Landsborough	Mike Ahern	NAT	22.6%
Roma	Ken Tomkins	NAT	22.6%
Sherwood	John Herbert	LIB	22.7%
Fassifern	Selwyn Muller	NAT	23.0%
Aspley	Fred Campbell	LIB	23.1%
Gympie	Max Hodges	NAT	23.6%
Burnett	Claude Wharton	NAT	24.1%
Warwick	David Cory	NAT	24.8%
Balonne	Don Neal	NAT	25.4%
Lockyer	Gordon Chalk	LIB	25.6%
Mount Coot-tha	Bill Lickiss	LIB	26.9%
Auburn	Neville Hewitt	NAT	27.9%
Somerset	Bill Gunn	NAT	28.3%
Condamine	Vic Sullivan	NAT	29.3%
Barambah	Joh Bjelke-Petersen	NAT	33.4%
Cunningham	Tony Elliott	NAT	36.5%

Labor seats (11)
Marginal
Bulimba	Jack Houston	ALP	1.7%
Wolston	Evan Marginson	ALP	2.3%
Bundaberg	Lou Jensen	ALP	2.5%
Sandgate	Harold Dean	ALP	3.5%
Rockhampton	Keith Wright	ALP	3.6%
Nudgee	Jack Melloy	ALP	4.1%
Archerfield	Kevin Hooper	ALP	5.0%
Fairly safe
Rockhampton North	Les Yewdale	ALP	6.1%
Lytton	Tom Burns	ALP	6.7%
Cairns	Ray Jones	ALP	7.3%
Safe
Port Curtis	Martin Hanson	ALP	15.7%
Crossbench seats (2)
Townsville South	Tom Aikens	IND	5.8 v ALP
Mackay	Ed Casey	IND	20.5 v NAT

== See also ==
- Members of the Queensland Legislative Assembly, 1972–1974
- Members of the Queensland Legislative Assembly, 1974–1977
- Candidates of the Queensland state election, 1974
- Bjelke-Petersen Ministry
