= Electoral district of Townsville East =

Former electoral district of Queensland

Townsville East Queensland—Legislative Assembly
- State: Queensland
- Created: 1986
- Abolished: 1992
- Namesake: Townsville

Townsville East was an electoral district of the Legislative Assembly in the Australian state of Queensland from 1986 to 1992.

It was formed from the areas of the abolished districts of Townsville West and Townsville South.

The district was abolished in the 1991 redistribution, and its territory was absorbed into the new district of Mundingburra and the existing district of Burdekin.

== Member ==
Member	Party	Term
Geoff Smith	Labor	1986–1992

== See also ==
- Electoral districts of Queensland
- Members of the Queensland Legislative Assembly by year
- Category:Members of the Queensland Legislative Assembly by name
