= Geoff Smith (politician) =

Australian politician

The Hon Geoff Smith

Member of the Queensland Legislative Assembly for Townsville West
- In office 29 November 1980 – 1 November 1986
- Preceded by: Max Hooper
- Succeeded by: Seat abolished

Member of the Queensland Legislative Assembly for Townsville East
- In office 1 November 1986 – 19 September 1992
- Preceded by: New seat
- Succeeded by: Seat abolished

Member of the Queensland Legislative Assembly for Townsville
- In office 19 September 1992 – 13 June 1998
- Preceded by: Ken Davies
- Succeeded by: Mike Reynolds

Personal details
- Born: Geoffrey Norman Smith; 9 January 1934 (age 92) Bundaberg, Queensland, Australia
- Died: 14 April 2025 Parkview Nursing Home Brisbane
- Resting place: Montville
- Party: Labor
- Occupation: Electrical technician

Geoffrey Norman "Geoff" Smith (born 9 January 1934) is a former Australian politician.

Smith was born in Bundaberg and worked as a senior technical officer before entering politics. A long-time member of the Labor Party, he was president and secretary of the Ross River branch and secretary of the Townsville branch.

In 1980 he was elected to the Queensland Legislative Assembly as the member for Townsville West, transferring to Townsville East in 1986 and Townsville in 1992. He was the Opposition Health Spokesman from 1982 to 1985, transferring to Environment in 1985, Industry, Technology and Northern Development in 1986, Corrective Services, Administrative Services and Valuation in 1987, Tourism, Sport and Racing in 1988 and Industry, Communications and Technology later that year.

When Labor won the 1989 state election he was appointed Minister for Manufacturing and Commerce, to which small business was added in 1990. Later in 1990 the portfolio was reorganised as Business, Industry and Regional Development. In 1992 he became Minister for Lands, holding the position until 1995. Smith retired in 1998.

Parliament of Queensland
Preceded by Max Hooper	Member for Townsville West; 1980–1986	Abolished
New seat	Member for Townsville East; 1986–1992	Abolished
Preceded by Ken Davies	Member for Townsville; 1992–1998	Succeeded by Mike Reynolds
