= Max Hooper =

Australian politician (1926–2000)

Max Hooper OAM

Member of the Queensland Legislative Assembly for Townsville West
- In office 7 December 1974 – 29 November 1980
- Preceded by: Perc Tucker
- Succeeded by: Geoff Smith

Personal details
- Born: Maxwell David Hooper; 20 January 1926 Townsville, Queensland, Australia
- Died: 19 November 2000 (aged 74) Brisbane, Queensland, Australia
- Party: National Party
- Spouse: Beryl Palm Cook (m.1953)
- Occupation: Land developer

Maxwell David "Max" Hooper (20 January 1926 – 19 November 2000) was a member of the Queensland Legislative Assembly.

== Biography ==
Hooper was born in Townsville, Queensland, the son of Archibald David Hooper and his wife Ada Beatrice (née Carron). He was educated at the Central State Primary School in Townsville before attending the Townsville Grammar School. He joined the RAAF in February 1945, towards the end of World War II, and was discharged in September of the same year while still in training. He was then a Motel Owner/Operator and land developer in Townsville from 1947 until 1972.

On 21 February 1953 Hooper married Beryl Palm Cook and together had two sons and two daughters. He died in Brisbane in November 2000.

== Public life ==
Hooper, representing the National Party, won the seat of Townsville West at the 1974 Queensland state elections, defeating Labor leader Perc Tucker in his own seat. He held the seat for six years, being defeated by Geoff Smith in 1980. He was the Minister for Maritime Services and Tourism from August 1979 until his defeat a year later.

He was an alderman in the Townsville City Council from 1971 to 1972 and then he was elected Mayor of Townsville from 1972 until 1976.

Parliament of Queensland
Preceded by Perc Tucker	Member for Townsville West; 1974–1980	Succeeded by Geoff Smith
