= Kiernan Dorney =

Australian surgeon

- Born: 9 January 1912; Ascot Vale, Victoria
- Died: 30 August 2007 (aged 95)
- Education: University of Melbourne
- Military career
- Allegiance: Australia
- Branch: Australian Army
- Service years: 1939–1957
- Rank: Lieutenant Colonel
- Commands: 2/3rd Field Ambulance
- Conflicts: Second World War; Korean War; Vietnam War
- Awards: Commander of the Order of the British Empire; Distinguished Service Order; Member of the Order of Australia; Mentioned in Despatches (3)

Kiernan John Joseph "Skipper" Dorney, CBE, DSO, AM (9 January 1912 – 30 August 2007) was an Australian surgeon and a highly decorated Australian Army officer.

He was educated at St Kevin's College in Melbourne, and studied engineering at the University of Melbourne before transferring to medicine, in which he graduated in 1937. He worked at St Vincent's Hospital before enlisting in the armed forces on 4 December 1939. First posted to Liberia, he subsequently served in Greece and Crete, where he was captured by the invading Germans. He escaped the prisoner of war camp and lived in hiding until he was able to gain passage on a Royal Navy boat to Egypt. Following a period of illness, he then served in Syria with the 9th Division, and then in New Guinea; during a leave in Melbourne between Syria and New Guinea, he was married and promoted to major. He received the Distinguished Service Order for acts of bravery in New Guinea.

Later promoted to lieutenant colonel, Dorney commanded the 2/3rd Field Ambulance in Labuan and Borneo, and during the war was thrice mentioned in despatches (twice in Africa and once in New Guinea). Following the war he returned to surgical training, becoming fully qualified in 1947. From 1947 to 1949 he was medical superintendent at Latrobe Hospital in Tasmania before he was recruited to become medical superintendent of Townsville General Hospital. In 1952 he volunteered to serve in the Korean War, where he was a surgeon with the British Commonwealth Occupation Force. On his return, finding that his post at Townsville had been filled, he moved into private practice. He served briefly as medical superintendent following his successor's retirement in 1971.

In 1971 Dorney was part of a civilian team sent to the Vietnam War, where he served for three months. From 1960 to 1982 he was Chairman of the North Queensland Conference Committee of the Australian Medical Association, and he was also closely involved in the local Red Cross. He established the North Queensland branch of the Endeavour Foundation, of which he later became Queensland Vice-President, and also served as chairman of the Women's Catholic Residential College of St Raphael's at James Cook University from 1974 to 1982. He was also a member of the university's council from 1971 to 1982. He later retired to Buderim, and was appointed a Member of the Order of Australia in 1992. In 2005 he was awarded the Tribute Medal for the Battle of Crete by the Greek government.

Dorney was also involved in politics as a member of the Democratic Labor Party, standing several times as a candidate. He died in 2007.
