= Jack Houston =

Australian politician

Jack Houston AM
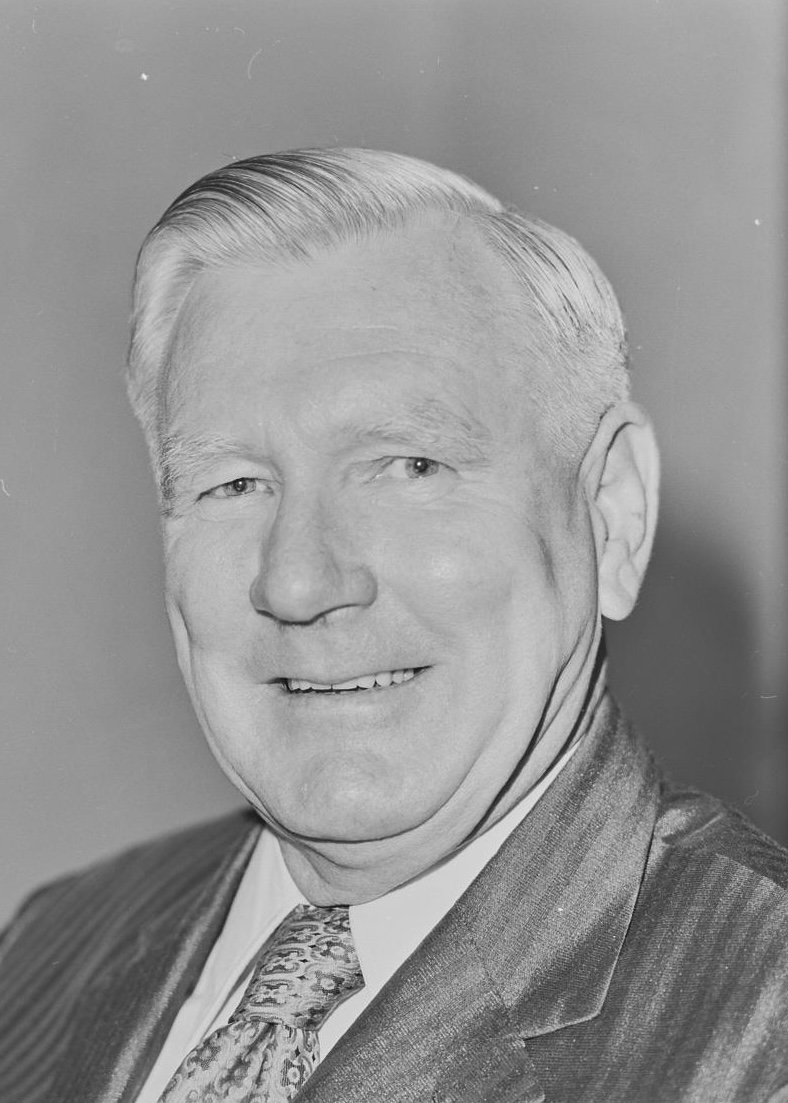
- Houston in 1973

Leader of the Opposition in Queensland Leader of the Labor Party in Queensland Elections: 1969, 1972
- In office 12 October 1966 – 1 July 1974
- Deputy: Perc Tucker
- Preceded by: Jack Duggan
- Succeeded by: Perc Tucker

Deputy Leader of the Opposition in Queensland Deputy Leader of the Labor Party in Queensland
- In office November 1976 – 19 February 1980
- Leader: Tom Burns; Ed Casey
- Preceded by: Jack Melloy
- Succeeded by: Bill D'Arcy
- In office June 1966 – 12 October 1966
- Leader: Jack Duggan
- Preceded by: Eric Lloyd
- Succeeded by: Perc Tucker

Member of the Queensland Legislative Assembly for Bulimba
- In office 3 August 1957 – 25 July 1980
- Preceded by: Robert Gardner
- Succeeded by: Ron McLean

Personal details
- Born: John William Houston; 30 December 1919 Wick, Scotland, United Kingdom
- Died: 27 October 2008 (aged 88) Brisbane, Queensland, Australia
- Resting place: Balmoral Cemetery
- Party: Labor
- Spouse: Joan Catherine Lindsay (m. 1942)
- Education: Brisbane Technical College
- Occupation: Electrical fitter, Teacher

John William Houston (30 December 1919 – 27 October 2008) was an Australian politician. He was the Labor member for Bulimba in the Legislative Assembly of Queensland from 1957 to 1980. He was the Leader of the Opposition in the Queensland Parliament from 11 October 1966 to 22 July 1974.

== Early life ==
Born in Scotland in 1919 to James Houston and Florence (née Tilley) he moved to Australia and became electrical fitter and mechanic and later a teacher of electrical trades subjects.

== Political career ==
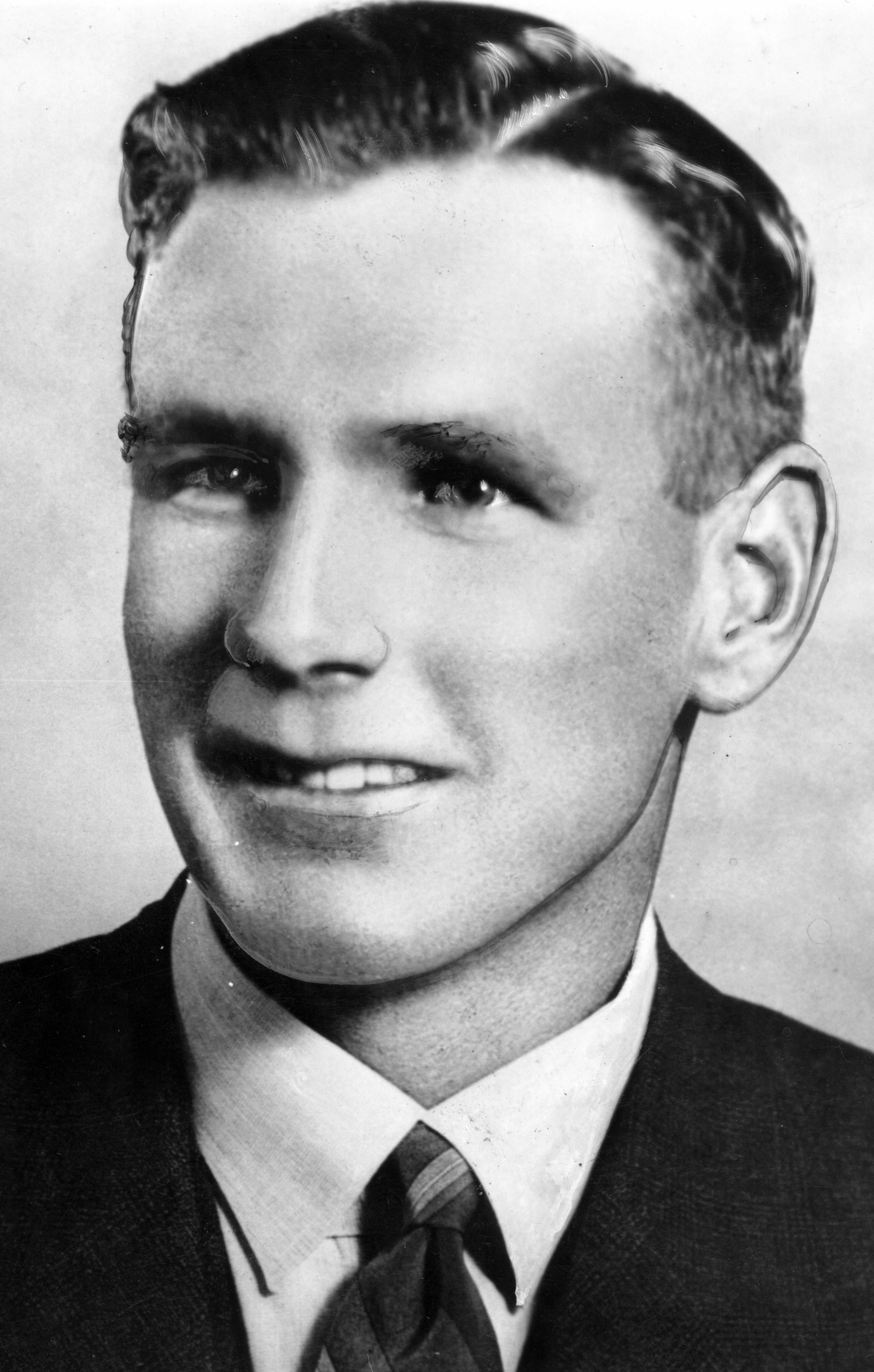
Houston in May 1954.

He first entered Parliament at the 1957 election that saw Labor swept from office following a split.

=== Party Leadership ===
Following the 1966 election deputy leader Eric Lloyd became the subject of attacks from the extra-parliamentary wing of the Labor party, as well as within the caucus. As a result, party leader Jack Duggan supported Houston in challenging Lloyd which he did successfully by 15 votes to 10.

Three months later on 11 October 1966 Duggan abruptly resigned as leader due to a "taxation difficulty of some magnitude". In the following ballot Houston defeated Pat Hanlon (son of former Premier Ned Hanlon) by 14 votes to 12 to become the new leader.

As opposition leader he established an arrangement of nominating ‘shadow spokespeople’ for specific portfolios which led in 1970 to the formation of Labor's first formal ‘shadow ministry’ of 14 members.

After failing to make significant inroads into the coalition's majority at either the 1969 or 1972 elections there were reports that Houston would be leaving the leadership either through appointment to the Qantas board or as High Commissioner to New Zealand, however these never came to pass.

Ultimately his deputy Perc Tucker organised a vote of no confidence in his leadership following the poor result in the federal election which was carried by 17 votes to 15, with Tucker defeating Houston by the same margin.

=== Post Leadership ===
After the disastrous election of 1974 where the ALP was reduced to just 11 seats, with Tucker and his deputy Newton losing their seats, Houston contested the deputy leadership against Jack Melloy but he was unsuccessful. He served as Shadow Treasurer and Shadow Minister for Police.

After Melloy stood down in 1976 he was returned to the deputy leadership where he served until he retired in 1980.

== Personal life ==
He married Joan Catherine Lindsay on 18 March 1942. They had two children, one son & one daughter.

Houston died in 2008 and is buried in Brisbane's Balmoral Cemetery.

Political offices
Preceded by Jack Duggan	Leader of the Opposition of Queensland; 1966–1974	Succeeded by Perc Tucker
Parliament of Queensland
Preceded by Robert Gardner	Member for Bulimba; 1957–1980	Succeeded by Ron McLean
