= Rosemary Kyburz =

Australian politician

Member of the Queensland Legislative Assembly for Salisbury
- In office 7 December 1974 – 22 October 1983
- Preceded by: Doug Sherrington
- Succeeded by: Wayne Goss

Personal details
- Born: Rosemary Annette Plim; 16 April 1944 (age 82) Sydney, New South Wales, Australia
- Party: Liberal Party
- Spouse(s): Rolf Kyburz; Rob Akers
- Children: 2
- Occupation: School teacher

Rosemary Annette Kyburz (née Plim; born 16 April 1944) Member of the Queensland State Parliament (1974–1983) as the Liberal Member for Salisbury.

Kyburz married fellow politician Rob Akers while in parliament, the first time sitting members had married each other. The two had two children. Another first was Kyburz giving birth to her first son while a parliamentarian.

Kyburz was a well-known supporter of feminist causes in 1970s Queensland politics. She and her husband both lost their seats in the 1983 Liberal Party electoral collapse after National Party Premier (Sir Joh Bjelke-Petersen) characterised many of the Liberal Party members of his Coalition government as "ratbags".

She later stated that she would prefer to lose her seat to a Labor Party candidate than a National: she received her wish, being defeated in 1983, shortly after giving birth, by Wayne Goss.

== Personal life ==
Kyburz was born Rosemary Annette Plim in Sydney, Australia, daughter of John Bruce Plim and Zoe Rose Plim. She married her first husband, Rolf Kyburz in Argentina.

Parliament of Queensland
Preceded by Doug Sherrington	Member for Salisbury; 1974–1983	Succeeded by Wayne Goss
