= Electoral district of Belmont (Queensland) =

Former state electoral district of Queensland (1960–1977)

Belmont Queensland—Legislative Assembly
- State: Queensland
- Dates current: 1960–1977
- Namesake: Belmont

Belmont was an electoral district of the Legislative Assembly in the Australian state of Queensland from 1960 to 1977.

First created for the 1960 state election, the district was based in the south-eastern suburbs of Brisbane, taking in areas previously belonging to the districts of Bulimba, Mount Gravatt and Wynnum. Typically a Labor seat, the district fell to the Liberal Party at the Coalition landslide election of 1974.

Belmont was abolished ahead of 1977 state election and largely absorbed into the neighbouring district of Chatsworth.

== Members for Belmont ==
Member	Party	Term
Fred Newton	Labor	1960–1974
David Byrne	Liberal	1974–1977

== See also ==
- Electoral districts of Queensland
- Members of the Queensland Legislative Assembly by year
- Category:Members of the Queensland Legislative Assembly by name
