= Fred Newton (politician) =

Australian politician

Deputy Leader of the Opposition in Queensland Deputy Leader of the Labor Party in Queensland
- In office 1 July 1974 – 19 December 1974
- Leader: Perc Tucker
- Preceded by: Perc Tucker
- Succeeded by: Jack Melloy

Member of the Queensland Legislative Assembly for Belmont
- In office 28 May 1960 – 7 December 1974
- Preceded by: New seat
- Succeeded by: David Byrne

Personal details
- Born: Harold Francis Newton; 12 July 1921 Maryborough, Queensland, Australia
- Died: 28 December 1990 (aged 69) Brisbane, Queensland, Australia
- Party: Labor
- Spouse: Ada Gwendoline Holzapfel
- Occupation: Trade union organiser

Harold Francis "Fred" Newton (12 July 1921 – 28 December 1990) was a Member of the Queensland Legislative Assembly.

== Early Days ==
Newton was born in Maryborough to Francis and Ada Laura Newton (née Davey). Due to family financial pressures Harold and his sister Ada were made wards of the state and sent to an orphanage in Nudgee, Brisbane for three years. As state wards were deemed to owe a debt to the state Newton was sent work on a dairy farm in Pittsworth. This farm was eventually sold and he was relocated to a farm in Maryvale. When he turned 18 he returned to his family in Maryborough.

In 1946, Newton was working in a bacon factory when due to a strike he left his job and became a builder's labourer. This led to a long association with the Building Workers' Industrial Union and he served the role of state organiser from 1953 till 1960.

== Politics ==
Newton won the newly created seat of Belmont in 1960 and remained as its member till his defeat at the 1974 state election. He was Deputy Leader of the Opposition for 5 months from July 1974 and a member of the Parliamentary Labor Party Executive from 1966 to 1974.

== Personal life ==
Newton was married to Ada Gwendoline Holzapfel and together they had seven children. After politics he was a real estate salesman and then became a general assistant at the Queensland State Library Board. Known as "Fearless Fred", Newton died in 1990.

Parliament of Queensland
New seat	Member for Belmont; 1960–1974	Succeeded by David Byrne
