= Doug Sherrington =

Australian politician (1914–1999)

Member of the Queensland Legislative Assembly for Salisbury
- In office 28 May 1960 – 7 December 1974
- Preceded by: New seat
- Succeeded by: Rosemary Kyburz

Personal details
- Born: Douglas John Sherrington; 7 December 1914 Bundaberg, Queensland, Australia
- Died: 25 March 1999 (aged 84) Brisbane, Queensland, Australia
- Party: Labor
- Spouse: Edith Etta Grummett (m.1940 d.1995)
- Occupation: Electrician

Douglas John Sherrington (7 December 1914 – 25 March 1999) was a member of the Queensland Legislative Assembly.

== Biography ==
Sherrington was born at Bundaberg, Queensland, the son of Thomas Duncan Sherrington and his wife Jane Anderson (née Fergus). He attended school at Booyal, at Junction Park State School in Annerley, Brisbane and at the Brisbane Central Technical College. He became a junior clerk and trainee accountant. He then was an electrical worker with the Brisbane City Council and Evans Deakin and Company Kangaroo Point shipyards. In World War II he used his electrical skills on the warships and was seconded to the American small ships section in 1942.

On 26 October 1940, Sherrington married Edith Etta Grummett (died 1995) and together had one son and two daughters. Doug died at Brisbane in March 1999 and was cremated at the Mt Thompson Crematorium.

== Public life ==
Sherrington won the new seat of Salisbury at the 1960 Queensland state election. He held the seat until 1974. He was an outspoken advocate for the environment and conservation before it became a major movement especially in regards to Cooloola, the Great Barrier Reef, and the Southwood National Park.

He wrote the first draft of Labor's first conservation policy and was president of the Save the Trees foundation from 1950 until 1960. He was a member of many other groups that focused on conservation including being an associate member of the British Naturalists' Association.

Parliament of Queensland
New seat	Member for Salisbury; 1960–1974	Succeeded by Rosemary Kyburz
