= Electoral district of Salisbury (Queensland) =

Former state electoral district of Queensland, Australia

Salisbury Queensland—Legislative Assembly
- State: Queensland
- Created: 1960
- Abolished: 1992
- Namesake: Salisbury, Queensland

Salisbury was an electoral district of the Legislative Assembly in the Australian state of Queensland from 1960 to 1992.

It was based on the southern Brisbane suburb of Salisbury, and was created in the 1959 redistribution under the Nicklin government, mostly from areas split from the district of Sherwood. In 1971, part of the electorate was transferred to the Archerfield electorate.

Salisbury was mostly a safe Labor seat, but was gained by Rosemary Kyburz, a prominent moderate Liberal, in Labor's landslide defeat at the 1974 election, and not regained until 1983 by future Premier Wayne Goss.

The Salisbury electorate was abolished in the 1991 redistribution and its area was absorbed into the new district of Sunnybank and the existing district of Archerfield.

== Members for Salisbury ==
Member	Party	Term
Doug Sherrington	Labor	1960–1974
Rosemary Kyburz	Liberal	1974–1983
Wayne Goss	Labor	1983–1986
Len Ardill	Labor	1986–1992

== See also ==
- Electoral districts of Queensland
- Members of the Queensland Legislative Assembly by year
- Category:Members of the Queensland Legislative Assembly by name
