= Perc Tucker =

Australian politician

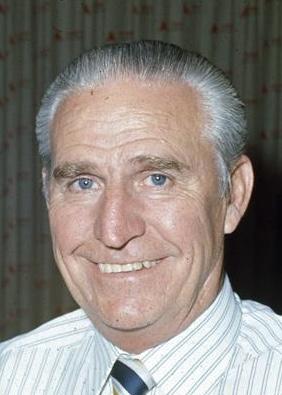
- Tucker in 1974

Leader of the Opposition in Queensland Leader of the Labor Party in Queensland Elections: 1974
- In office 2 July 1974 – 7 December 1974
- Deputy: Fred Newton
- Preceded by: Jack Houston
- Succeeded by: Tom Burns

Deputy Leader of the Opposition in Queensland Deputy Leader of the Labor Party in Queensland
- In office 12 October 1966 – 2 July 1974
- Leader: Jack Houston
- Preceded by: Jack Houston
- Succeeded by: Fred Newton

Member of the Queensland Legislative Assembly for Townsville West Townsville North (1960–1972)
- In office 28 May 1960 – 7 December 1974
- Preceded by: New seat
- Succeeded by: Max Hooper

Personal details
- Born: Percy John Robert Tucker; 5 December 1919 Rockhampton, Queensland, Australia
- Died: 20 August 1980 (aged 60) Townsville, Queensland, Australia
- Party: Labor
- Height: 5 ft 10.5 in (179 cm)
- Spouse: Isabel Mary Campbell (m.1944)
- Occupation: Draftsman

Percy John Robert "Perc" Tucker (5 December 1919 – 20 August 1980) was a member of the Queensland Legislative Assembly. He was the leader of the opposition in 1974.

== Biography ==
Tucker was born in Rockhampton, Queensland, the son of Percy Clifford Tucker and his wife Beatrice (née Guthrie). He was educated at Rockhampton state and high schools before being employed in Brisbane by the Department of Public Works in 1937. He then worked as a draftsman in Rockhampton before moving to Townsville in 1955 and continuing the trade until 1960.

During World War II Tucker enlisted with the RAAF in December 1940 but was discharged a month later. Then in March 1943 Tucker once again enlisted, this time with the Australian Army and served with the 42nd Australian Infantry Battalion in New Guinea and Bouganville. From 1948 until 1955 he was a captain in the reserve army.

On 20 June 1944 he married Isabel Mary Campbell, a hairdresser, at the Holy Trinity Church in Mackay and together had three sons and a daughter. One son, Rodney, died at a young age in 1956 after breaking his arm and died on the operating table whilst under anaesthetic. Tucker died in Townsville in August 1980 and his funeral was held at the John Knox Presbyterian church and he was later cremated.

== Public life ==
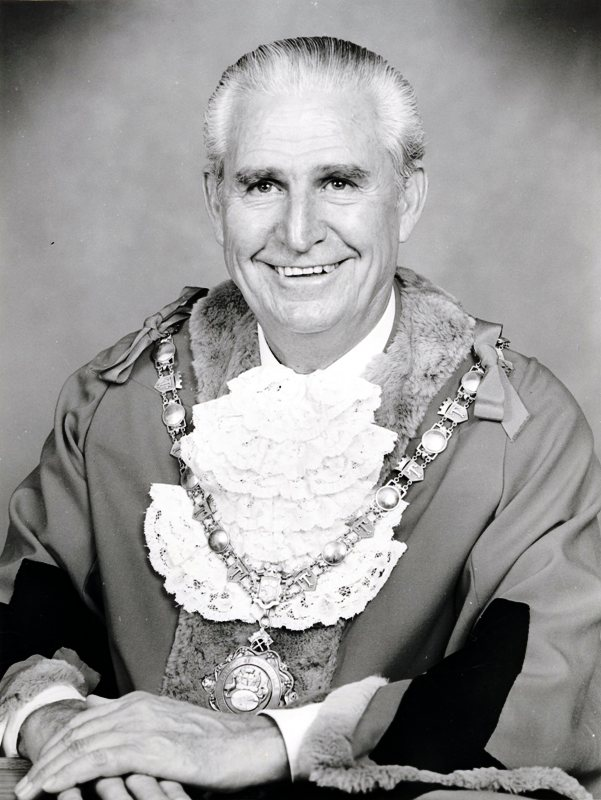
Tucker in mayoral robes c. 1976.

Tucker, representing the Labor Party, won the new seat of Townsville North at the 1960 Queensland state elections. He held the seat until it was abolished for the 1972 Queensland state elections, at which Tucker followed most of his constituents into the new seat of Townsville West.

From July 1966 until July 1974 Tucker was the deputy opposition leader under Jack Houston. In July 1974 he challenged Houston for the leadership and defeated him by 17 votes to 15.

Facing an election later that year, Tucker famously vowed to give Premier Joh Bjelke-Petersen a "hiding." However, the Queensland ALP was roundly defeated, falling to a "cricket team" of only 11 seats. Tucker himself lost his own seat to National Max Hooper–one of the few instances in which a major-party leader at the federal, state or territory level has been rolled in his own seat.

Tucker wasn't finished with politics however, and in 1976 he was elected the mayor of Townsville, holding the role until his death in 1980. The Perc Tucker Regional Gallery (opened 1981) in Townsville is named in his honour.

Parliament of Queensland
New seat	Member for Townsville North; 1960–1972	Abolished
New seat	Member for Townsville West; 1972–1974	Succeeded by Max Hooper
