= Electoral district of Townsville West =

Former state electoral district of Queensland, Australia

Townsville West Queensland—Legislative Assembly
- State: Queensland
- Created: 1972
- Abolished: 1986
- Namesake: Townsville

Townsville West was an electoral district of the Legislative Assembly in the Australian state of Queensland from 1972 to 1986.

It mostly covered the western suburbs of the North Queensland city of Townsville.

The seat was abolished in the 1985 redistribution, effective at the 1986 election.

== Members for Townsville West ==
Member	Party	Term
Perc Tucker	Labor	1972–1974
Max Hooper	National	1974–1980
Geoff Smith	Labor	1980–1986

== See also ==
- Electoral districts of Queensland
- Members of the Queensland Legislative Assembly by year
- Category:Members of the Queensland Legislative Assembly by name
