= Results of the 1977 Queensland state election =

Queensland state election, 12 November 1977 Legislative Assembly << 1974–1980 >>
Enrolled voters	1,209,494				
Votes cast	1,104,898		Turnout	91.35%	+1.93%
Informal votes	16,887		Informal	1.53%	–0.05%
Summary of votes by party
Party	Primary votes	%	Swing	Seats	Change
Labor	466,021	42.83%	+6.80%	23	+12
National	295,355	27.15%	–0.73%	35	–4
Liberal	274,398	25.22%	–5.87%	24	–6
Democrats	17,571	1.61%	+1.61%	0	±0
Progress	16,327	1.50%	+1.50%	0	±0
Independent	18,339	1.69%	–1.22%	0	–2
Total	1,088,011			82	

This is a list of electoral district results for the 1977 Queensland state election.

== Results by electoral district ==
=== Albert ===
1977 Queensland state election: Albert
Party	Candidate	Votes	%	±%
National	Ivan Gibbs	8,010	53.3	+16.6
Labor	Denis O'Connell	4,582	30.5	−6.0
Labor	Cecil Clark	1,922	12.8	+12.8
Independent	Alex McMillan	295	2.0	+2.0
Independent	Ace Drabsch	229	1.5	+1.5
Total formal votes		15,038	97.9	
Informal votes		320	2.1	
Turnout		15,358	89.5	
Two-party-preferred result
National	Ivan Gibbs	8,271	55.0	−6.2
Labor	Denis O'Connell	6,766	45.0	+6.2
National hold		Swing	−6.2	

=== Archerfield ===
1977 Queensland state election: Archerfield
Party	Candidate	Votes	%	±%
Labor	Kevin Hooper	9,651	66.6	+13.1
Liberal	Bevan Fleming	2,989	20.6	−21.7
National	John Armstrong	1,177	8.1	+8.1
National	George Kalaja	683	4.7	+4.7
Total formal votes		14,500	97.6	
Informal votes		357	2.4	
Turnout		14,857	90.8	
Two-party-preferred result
Labor	Kevin Hooper	9,911	68.4	+13.7
Liberal	Bevan Fleming	4,589	31.6	−13.7
Labor hold		Swing	+13.7	

=== Ashgrove ===
1977 Queensland state election: Ashgrove
Party	Candidate	Votes	%	±%
Liberal	John Greenwood	7,468	50.8	+6.7
Labor	Pat Comben	6,375	43.4	+12.5
Progress	Gary Sturgess	862	5.9	+5.9
Total formal votes		14,706	99.0	
Informal votes		151	1.0	
Turnout		14,857	92.2	
Two-party-preferred result
Liberal	John Greenwood	8,071	54.9	−11.6
Labor	Pat Comben	6,634	45.1	+11.6
Liberal hold		Swing	−11.6	

=== Aspley ===
1977 Queensland state election: Aspley
Party	Candidate	Votes	%	±%
Liberal	Fred Campbell	9,237	61.5	−11.6
Labor	Philip Gray	5,789	38.5	+11.6
Total formal votes		15,026	98.7	
Informal votes		198	1.3	
Turnout		15,224	93.0	
Liberal hold		Swing	−11.6	

=== Auburn ===
1977 Queensland state election: Auburn
Party	Candidate	Votes	%	±%
National	Neville Hewitt	6,153	67.8	−10.2
Labor	Jeffrey Lenz	2,342	25.8	+3.7
Progress	David Trevilyan	576	6.4	+6.4
Total formal votes		9,071	99.0	
Informal votes		89	1.0	
Turnout		9,160	92.9	
Two-party-preferred result
National	Neville Hewitt	6,556	72.3	−5.7
Labor	Jeffrey Lenz	2,515	27.7	+5.7
National hold		Swing	−5.7	

=== Balonne ===
1977 Queensland state election: Balonne
Party	Candidate	Votes	%	±%
National	Don Neal	5,064	71.9	−3.2
Labor	Robert Saltau	1,975	28.1	+3.2
Total formal votes		7,039	98.3	
Informal votes		119	1.7	
Turnout		7,158	89.5	
National hold		Swing	−3.2	

=== Barambah ===
1977 Queensland state election: Barambah
Party	Candidate	Votes	%	±%
National	Joh Bjelke-Petersen	7,707	78.3	−5.1
Labor	John Hunt	2,136	21.7	+5.1
Total formal votes		9,843	98.5	
Informal votes		147	1.5	
Turnout		9,990	93.8	
National hold		Swing	−5.1	

=== Barron River ===
1977 Queensland state election: Barron River
Party	Candidate	Votes	%	±%
National	Martin Tenni	7,663	50.2	+3.0
Labor	Keith De Lacy	7,593	49.8	+2.1
Total formal votes		15,256	98.1	
Informal votes		301	1.9	
Turnout		15,557	89.5	
National hold		Swing	−0.7	

=== Brisbane Central ===
1977 Queensland state election: Brisbane Central
Party	Candidate	Votes	%	±%
Labor	Brian Davis	7,641	52.7	
Liberal	Dennis Young	6,359	43.9	
Socialist	Dennis Bailey	490	3.4	
Total formal votes		14,490	97.8	
Informal votes		329	2.2	
Turnout		14,819	88.3	
Two-party-preferred result
Labor	Brian Davis	8,033	55.4	+8.2
Liberal	Dennis Young	6,457	44.6	−8.2
Labor gain from Liberal		Swing	+8.2	

=== Bulimba ===
1977 Queensland state election: Bulimba
Party	Candidate	Votes	%	±%
Labor	Jack Houston	8,771	59.8	+9.6
Liberal	John Leggoe	5,905	40.2	−9.6
Total formal votes		14,676	98.2	
Informal votes		265	1.8	
Turnout		14,941	92.0	
Labor hold		Swing	+9.6	

=== Bundaberg ===
1977 Queensland state election: Bundaberg
Party	Candidate	Votes	%	±%
Labor	Jim Blake	6,898	48.7	−0.8
National	Bryan Conquest	4,471	31.6	+0.5
Liberal	John Heaps	1,863	13.2	−3.4
Independent	Lou Jensen	930	6.6	+6.6
Total formal votes		14,162	99.0	
Informal votes		148	1.0	
Turnout		14,310	93.5	
Two-party-preferred result
Labor	Jim Blake	7,705	54.4	+3.1
National	Bryan Conquest	6,457	44.6	−3.1
Labor hold		Swing	+3.1	

=== Burdekin ===
1977 Queensland state election: Burdekin
Party	Candidate	Votes	%	±%
National	Val Bird	6,181	60.3	−6.0
Labor	Alex Brown	4,076	39.7	+10.8
Total formal votes		10,257	98.9	
Informal votes		117	1.1	
Turnout		10,374	94.3	
National hold		Swing	−10.0	

=== Burnett ===
1977 Queensland state election: Burnett
Party	Candidate	Votes	%	±%
National	Claude Wharton	7,817	69.3	−4.8
Labor	Andrew Jackson	3,457	30.7	+4.8
Total formal votes		11,274	98.7	
Informal votes		151	1.3	
Turnout		11,425	91.4	
National hold		Swing	−4.8	

=== Caboolture ===
1977 Queensland state election: Caboolture
Party	Candidate	Votes	%	±%
National	Des Frawley	8,520	59.0	
Labor	John McLoughlin	3,955	27.4	
Labor	Francis Freemantle	1,973	13.7	
Total formal votes		14,448	98.2	
Informal votes		270	1.8	
Turnout		14,718	91.8	
Two-party-preferred result
National	Des Frawley	8,520	59.0	−7.5
Labor	John McLoughlin	5,928	41.0	+7.5
National hold		Swing	−7.5	

=== Cairns ===
1977 Queensland state election: Cairns
Party	Candidate	Votes	%	±%
Labor	Ray Jones	8,704	57.1	+6.3
National	Victor Piccone	4,533	29.7	−4.2
Democrats	Neville Modystack	1,012	6.6	+6.6
Liberal	Charles Bellairs	1,003	6.6	+6.6
Total formal votes		15,252	98.3	
Informal votes		259	1.7	
Turnout		15,511	88.8	
Two-party-preferred result
Labor	Ray Jones	9,370	61.4	+4.2
National	Victor Piccone	5,882	38.6	−4.2
Labor hold		Swing	+4.2	

=== Callide ===
1977 Queensland state election: Callide
Party	Candidate	Votes	%	±%
National	Lindsay Hartwig	7,383	65.3	−2.4
Labor	John O'Sullivan	3,928	34.7	+6.2
Total formal votes		11,311	98.7	
Informal votes		149	1.3	
Turnout		11,460	91.8	
National hold		Swing	−5.5	

=== Carnarvon ===
1977 Queensland state election: Carnarvon
Party	Candidate	Votes	%	±%
National	Peter McKechnie	5,875	63.5	+13.4
Labor	Colin Batterham	3,383	36.5	+11.5
Total formal votes		9,258	98.0	
Informal votes		184	2.0	
Turnout		9,442	92.7	
National hold		Swing	−8.1	

=== Chatsworth ===
1977 Queensland state election: Chatsworth
Party	Candidate	Votes	%	±%
Labor	Terry Mackenroth	7,683	51.1	+6.8
Liberal	David Byrne	7,363	48.9	−6.8
Total formal votes		15,046	98.2	
Informal votes		275	1.8	
Turnout		15,321	93.3	
Labor gain from Liberal		Swing	+6.8	

=== Condamine ===
1977 Queensland state election: Condamine
Party	Candidate	Votes	%	±%
National	Vic Sullivan	6,989	62.2	−15.4
Labor	Noel Wormald	2,703	24.1	+5.1
Progress	Lindsay Sturgess	1,268	11.3	+11.3
Independent	Lloyd Drabsch	267	2.4	+2.4
Total formal votes		11,227	99.1	
Informal votes		103	0.9	
Turnout		11,330	92.6	
Two-party-preferred result
National	Vic Sullivan	8,011	71.4	−7.9
Labor	Noel Wormald	3,216	28.6	+7.9
National hold		Swing	−7.9	

=== Cook ===
1977 Queensland state election: Cook
Party	Candidate	Votes	%	±%
Labor	Bob Scott	3,317	48.4	+12.8
National	Eric Deeral	2,841	41.5	+19.0
Australian Advancement Party	Ted Loban	690	10.1	+10.1
Total formal votes		6,848	97.8	
Informal votes		154	2.2	
Turnout		7,002	82.7	
Two-party-preferred result
Labor	Bob Scott	3,693	53.9	+6.5
National	Eric Deeral	3,155	46.1	−6.5
Labor gain from National		Swing	+6.5	

=== Cooroora ===
1977 Queensland state election: Cooroora
Party	Candidate	Votes	%	±%
National	Gordon Simpson	8,361	51.7	+4.1
Labor	Donald Sime	4,724	29.2	+9.4
Liberal	John Williams	3,078	19.0	−11.4
Total formal votes		16,163	99.1	
Informal votes		142	0.9	
Turnout		16,305	92.0	
Two-party-preferred result
National	Gordon Simpson	11,008	68.1	−6.8
Labor	Donald Sime	5,155	31.9	+6.8
National hold		Swing	−6.8	

=== Cunningham ===
1977 Queensland state election: Cunningham
Party	Candidate	Votes	%	±%
National	Tony Elliott	9,132	75.4	+4.5
Labor	Trevor Peacock	1,655	13.7	+2.7
Democrats	Valerie O'Phee	1,328	11.0	+11.0
Total formal votes		12,115	99.2	
Informal votes		96	0.8	
Turnout		12,211	93.4	
Two-party-preferred result
National	Tony Elliott	9,769	80.6	−5.9
Labor	Trevor Peacock	2,346	19.4	+5.9
National hold		Swing	−5.9	

=== Everton ===
1977 Queensland state election: Everton
Party	Candidate	Votes	%	±%
Labor	Glen Milliner	7,150	49.5	
Liberal	Brian Lindsay	6,559	45.4	
Progress	Owen Pershouse	739	5.1	+5.1
Total formal votes		14,448	99.0	
Informal votes		139	1.0	
Turnout		14,587	93.0	
Two-party-preferred result
Labor	Glen Milliner	7,374	51.0	+10.2
Liberal	Brian Lindsay	7,074	49.0	−10.2
Labor gain from Liberal		Swing	+10.2	

=== Fassifern ===
1977 Queensland state election: Fassifern
Party	Candidate	Votes	%	±%
National	Selwyn Muller	9,744	61.4	−9.8
Labor	Stephen Limbach	6,135	38.6	+9.8
Total formal votes		15,879	97.6	
Informal votes		393	2.4	
Turnout		16,272	92.0	
National hold		Swing	−9.8	

=== Flinders ===
1977 Queensland state election: Flinders
Party	Candidate	Votes	%	±%
National	Bob Katter	4,838	54.2	+6.3
Labor	Edward Schunemann	3,715	41.6	+8.3
Progress	Owen Pershouse	379	4.2	+4.2
Total formal votes		8,932	98.9	
Informal votes		95	1.1	
Turnout		9,027	90.1	
Two-party-preferred result
National	Bob Katter	5,103	57.1	−2.3
Labor	Edward Schunemann	3,829	42.9	+2.3
National hold		Swing	−2.3	

=== Greenslopes ===
1977 Queensland state election: Greenslopes
Party	Candidate	Votes	%	±%
Liberal	Bill Hewitt	5,663	38.5	−28.2
Labor	Lewin Blazevich	4,371	29.7	+0.6
National	Noel Cannon	2,828	19.2	+19.2
Democrats	David Anning	1,833	12.5	+12.5
Total formal votes		14,695	98.9	
Informal votes		164	1.1	
Turnout		14,859	91.8	
Two-party-preferred result
Liberal	Bill Hewitt	9,170	62.4	−8.3
Labor	Lewin Blazevich	5,525	37.6	+8.3
Liberal hold		Swing	−8.3	

=== Gregory ===
1977 Queensland state election: Gregory
Party	Candidate	Votes	%	±%
National	Bill Glasson	3,995	56.8	−2.4
Labor	Gordon Saunders	3,044	43.2	+2.4
Total formal votes		7,039	98.7	
Informal votes		90	1.3	
Turnout		7,129	87.3	
National hold		Swing	−2.4	

=== Gympie ===
1977 Queensland state election: Gympie
Party	Candidate	Votes	%	±%
National	Max Hodges	7,097	61.5	−12.1
Labor	Reginald Lawler	3,232	28.0	+1.6
Progress	William Runge	1,211	10.5	+10.5
Total formal votes		11,540	99.1	
Informal votes		106	0.9	
Turnout		11,646	93.8	
Two-party-preferred result
National	Max Hodges	7,945	68.8	−4.8
Labor	Reginald Lawler	3,595	31.2	+4.8
National hold		Swing	−4.8	

==== By-election ====
- This by-election was caused by the resignation of Max Hodges. It was held on 1 September 1979.

1979 Gympie state by-election
Party	Candidate	Votes	%	±%
National	Len Stephan	5,620	49.5	−12.0
Labor	Reginald Lawler	3,431	30.2	+2.2
Liberal	Ray Hilder	1,780	15.7	+15.7
Progress	William Runge	532	4.7	−5.8
Total formal votes		11,363	99.2	+0.1
Informal votes		95	0.8	−0.1
Turnout		11,458	89.5	−4.3
After distribution of preferences
National	Len Stephan	5,906	52.0	
Labor	Reginald Lawler	3,567	31.4	
Liberal	Ray Hilder	1,890	16.6	
National hold		Swing	N/A	

- Preferences were not distributed to completion.

=== Hinchinbrook ===
1977 Queensland state election: Hinchinbrook
Party	Candidate	Votes	%	±%
National	Ted Row	5,854	53.1	−3.2
Labor	James Byrne	5,177	46.9	+13.8
Total formal votes		11,031	97.8	
Informal votes		242	2.2	
Turnout		11,273	92.2	
National hold		Swing	−7.3	

=== Ipswich ===
1977 Queensland state election: Ipswich
Party	Candidate	Votes	%	±%
Liberal	Llew Edwards	8,144	54.1	−12.1
Labor	Joseph Sciacca	6,895	45.9	+16.4
Total formal votes		15,039	98.5	
Informal votes		224	1.5	
Turnout		15,263	93.4	
Liberal hold		Swing	−13.3	

=== Ipswich West ===
1977 Queensland state election: Ipswich West
Party	Candidate	Votes	%	±%
Labor	David Underwood	7,776	52.4	+6.4
National	Albert Hales	5,042	34.0	+8.6
Liberal	Barry Spark	2,025	13.6	−9.9
Total formal votes		14,843	98.9	
Informal votes		161	1.1	
Turnout		15,004	91.2	
Two-party-preferred result
Labor	David Underwood	8,059	54.3	+5.4
National	Albert Hales	6,784	45.7	−5.4
Labor gain from National		Swing	+5.4	

=== Isis ===
1977 Queensland state election: Isis
Party	Candidate	Votes	%	±%
National	Lin Powell	6,435	48.4	+15.0
Labor	Phillip Barnsley	4,947	37.3	−7.7
Liberal	Mary Spurway	1,554	11.7	−9.9
Independent	James Dobson	346	2.6	+2.6
Total formal votes		13,282	98.9	
Informal votes		150	1.1	
Turnout		13,432	92.2	
Two-party-preferred result
National	Lin Powell	7,861	59.2	+5.8
Labor	Phillip Barnsley	5,421	40.8	−5.8
National hold		Swing	+5.8	

=== Ithaca ===
1977 Queensland state election: Ithaca
Party	Candidate	Votes	%	±%
Liberal	Col Miller	7,419	53.5	−11.2
Labor	Francis Gilbert	5,948	42.9	+7.6
Progress	Paul Rackemann	492	3.6	+3.6
Total formal votes		13,859	98.7	
Informal votes		175	1.3	
Turnout		14,034	90.9	
Two-party-preferred result
Liberal	Col Miller	7,763	56.0	−8.7
Labor	Francis Gilbert	6,096	44.0	+8.7
Liberal hold		Swing	−8.7	

=== Kurilpa ===
1977 Queensland state election: Kurilpa
Party	Candidate	Votes	%	±%
Liberal	Sam Doumany	6,547	45.4	+5.1
Labor	John Saunders	5,714	39.6	+2.0
Democrats	Stanley Stanley	1,922	13.3	+13.3
Progress	Fred Drake	240	1.7	+1.7
Total formal votes		14,423	98.3	
Informal votes		255	1.7	
Turnout		14,678	89.9	
Two-party-preferred result
Liberal	Sam Doumany	7,641	53.0	−9.3
Labor	John Saunders	6,782	47.0	+9.3
Liberal hold		Swing	−9.3	

=== Landsborough ===
1977 Queensland state election: Landsborough
Party	Candidate	Votes	%	±%
National	Mike Ahern	10,576	68.2	+0.5
Labor	Joan Kiely	4,922	31.8	+9.4
Total formal votes		15,498	98.4	
Informal votes		253	1.6	
Turnout		15,751	90.9	
National hold		Swing	−6.3	

=== Lockyer ===
1977 Queensland state election: Lockyer
Party	Candidate	Votes	%	±%
Liberal	Tony Bourke	8,337	55.0	−1.0
Labor	Norma Jones	2,970	19.6	+0.1
Independent	William Pechey	2,528	16.7	+16.7
Democrats	Brian Otto	1,329	8.8	+8.8
Total formal votes		15,164	99.0	
Informal votes		159	1.0	
Turnout		15,323	93.8	
Two-party-preferred result
Liberal	Tony Bourke	10,997	72.5	−3.4
Labor	Norma Jones	4,167	27.5	+3.4
Liberal hold		Swing	−3.4	

=== Lytton ===
1977 Queensland state election: Lytton
Party	Candidate	Votes	%	±%
Labor	Tom Burns	9,809	67.0	+10.3
Liberal	Rodney Bristow	4,835	33.0	−10.3
Total formal votes		14,644	98.5	
Informal votes		219	1.5	
Turnout		14,863	92.2	
Labor hold		Swing	+10.3	

=== Mackay ===
1977 Queensland state election: Mackay
Party	Candidate	Votes	%	±%
Labor	Ed Casey	9,438	57.1	+41.6
National	Fitzroy McLean	3,766	22.8	−4.4
Liberal	Jeanette Bevan	2,071	12.5	+12.5
Independent	Sebastian Torrisi	1,257	7.6	+7.6
Total formal votes		16,532	98.4	
Informal votes		262	1.6	
Turnout		16,794	92.2	
Two-party-preferred result
Labor	Ed Casey	10,231	61.9	+61.9
National	Fitzroy McLean	6,301	38.1	+0.6
Labor gain from Independent		Swing	N/A	

=== Mansfield ===
1977 Queensland state election: Mansfield
Party	Candidate	Votes	%	±%
Liberal	Bill Kaus	8,648	56.8	−12.5
Labor	Harry Zaphir	5,306	34.9	+7.7
Progress	John McKay	1,261	8.3	+8.3
Total formal votes		15,215	98.5	
Informal votes		238	1.5	
Turnout		15,453	92.6	
Two-party-preferred result
Liberal	Bill Kaus	9,531	62.6	−8.6
Labor	Harry Zaphir	5,684	37.4	+8.6
Liberal hold		Swing	−8.6	

=== Maryborough ===
1977 Queensland state election: Maryborough
Party	Candidate	Votes	%	±%
Labor	Brendan Hansen	6,930	50.2	+6.3
Liberal	Gilbert Alison	6,877	49.8	−5.2
Total formal votes		13,807	99.0	
Informal votes		138	1.0	
Turnout		13,945	93.8	
Labor gain from Liberal		Swing	+6.5	

=== Merthyr ===
1977 Queensland state election: Merthyr
Party	Candidate	Votes	%	±%
Liberal	Don Lane	7,508	53.6	−12.9
Labor	Barbara Dawson	5,937	42.4	+8.9
Progress	Harold Scruton	550	3.9	+3.9
Total formal votes		13,995	97.5	
Informal votes		356	2.5	
Turnout		14,351	88.6	
Two-party-preferred result
Liberal	Don Lane	7,893	56.4	−10.1
Labor	Barbara Dawson	6,102	43.6	+10.1
Liberal hold		Swing	−10.1	

=== Mirani ===
1977 Queensland state election: Mirani
Party	Candidate	Votes	%	±%
National	Tom Newbery	6,514	61.5	−8.1
Labor	Conrad Nicolai	4,069	38.5	+8.1
Total formal votes		10,583	98.7	
Informal votes		138	1.3	
Turnout		10,721	92.7	
National hold		Swing	−8.1	

=== Mount Coot-tha ===
1977 Queensland state election: Mount Coot-tha
Party	Candidate	Votes	%	±%
Liberal	Bill Lickiss	8,604	62.5	−12.6
Labor	Jon Stanford	3,719	27.0	+4.3
Progress	Wallace Younger	1,437	10.4	+10.4
Total formal votes		13,760	99.2	
Informal votes		115	0.8	
Turnout		13,875	91.9	
Two-party-preferred result
Liberal	Bill Lickiss	9,610	69.8	−8.6
Labor	Jon Stanford	4,150	30.2	+8.6
Liberal hold		Swing	−8.6	

=== Mount Gravatt ===
1977 Queensland state election: Mount Gravatt
Party	Candidate	Votes	%	±%
Labor	George Harvey	5,546	36.9	+6.4
Liberal	Guelfi Scassola	5,345	35.6	−31.6
National	Ian Henderson	3,486	23.2	+23.2
Progress	Desmond McKay	654	4.4	+4.4
Total formal votes		15,031	98.3	
Informal votes		261	1.7	
Turnout		15,292	92.0	
Two-party-preferred result
Liberal	Guelfi Scassola	9,085	60.4	−10.2
Labor	George Harvey	5,946	39.6	+10.2
Liberal hold		Swing	−10.2	

=== Mount Isa ===
1977 Queensland state election: Mount Isa
Party	Candidate	Votes	%	±%
Labor	Alex Pavusa	5,341	46.7	+7.8
National	Angelo Bertoni	5,209	45.5	+14.5
Progress	Keith Spanner	556	4.9	+4.9
Independent	Nelson Gavenor	246	2.2	+2.2
Independent	Anthony Assan	86	0.8	+0.8
Total formal votes		11,438	96.1	
Informal votes		464	3.9	
Turnout		11,902	84.9	
Two-party-preferred result
National	Angelo Bertoni	5,783	50.6	−2.9
Labor	Alex Pavusa	5,655	49.4	+2.9
National hold		Swing	−2.9	

=== Mourilyan ===
1977 Queensland state election: Mourilyan
Party	Candidate	Votes	%	±%
Labor	Peter Moore	4,688	47.4	+0.1
National	Vicky Kippin	4,666	47.1	−1.2
Independent	John Jones	544	5.5	+5.5
Total formal votes		9,898	98.3	
Informal votes		172	1.7	
Turnout		10,070	92.6	
Two-party-preferred result
National	Vicky Kippin	4,977	50.3	−1.4
Labor	Peter Moore	4,921	49.7	+1.4
National hold		Swing	−1.4	

=== Mulgrave ===
1977 Queensland state election: Mulgrave
Party	Candidate	Votes	%	±%
National	Roy Armstrong	5,629	58.4	−6.4
Labor	Bill Eaton	4,016	41.6	+6.4
Total formal votes		9,645	98.4	
Informal votes		156	1.6	
Turnout		9,801	92.3	
National hold		Swing	−6.4	

=== Murrumba ===
1977 Queensland state election: Murrumba
Party	Candidate	Votes	%	±%
Labor	Joe Kruger	6,377	46.5	+6.2
Liberal	Stephen Thomason	3,306	24.1	+24.1
National	Brian Frawley	2,157	15.7	−48.0
National	Agnes Campbell	1,861	13.6	+13.6
Total formal votes		13,701	97.9	
Informal votes		13,992	92.3	
Turnout		13,992	92.3	
Two-party-preferred result
Labor	Joe Kruger	7,036	51.4	+11.1
National	Brian Frawley	6,664	48.6	−11.1
Labor gain from National		Swing	+11.1	

=== Nudgee ===
1977 Queensland state election: Nudgee
Party	Candidate	Votes	%	±%
Labor	Ken Vaughan	8,483	58.7	+7.6
Liberal	Denis Simonyi	5,976	41.3	−7.6
Total formal votes		14,459	98.1	
Informal votes		278	1.9	
Turnout		14,737	92.6	
Labor hold		Swing	+7.6	

=== Nundah ===
1977 Queensland state election: Nundah
Party	Candidate	Votes	%	±%
Liberal	William Knox	8,235	58.1	−9.1
Labor	Leonard Hingley	5,927	41.9	+9.1
Total formal votes		14,162	98.2	
Informal votes		259	1.8	
Turnout		14,421	91.0	
Liberal hold		Swing	−9.1	

=== Peak Downs ===
1977 Queensland state election: Peak Downs
Party	Candidate	Votes	%	±%
National	Vince Lester	4,724	57.8	+7.6
Labor	Leonard Nicholson	3,452	42.2	+0.8
Total formal votes		8,176	98.4	
Informal votes		129	1.6	
Turnout		8,305	90.5	
National hold		Swing	−1.1	

=== Pine Rivers ===
1977 Queensland state election: Pine Rivers
Party	Candidate	Votes	%	±%
Liberal	Rob Akers	7,328	50.0	+10.3
Labor	Ken Leese	6,595	45.0	+8.2
Progress	Rodney Jeanneret	741	5.0	+5.0
Total formal votes		14,664	98.9	
Informal votes		156	1.1	
Turnout		14,820	93.2	
Two-party-preferred result
Liberal	Rob Akers	7,837	53.4	−8.5
Labor	Ken Leese	6,827	46.6	+8.5
Liberal hold		Swing	−8.5	

=== Port Curtis ===
1977 Queensland state election: Port Curtis
Party	Candidate	Votes	%	±%
Labor	Bill Prest	7,048	58.6	−4.5
National	Barry Johnson	2,732	22.7	+4.5
Liberal	John Mawer	1,805	15.0	−3.6
Progress	Michael Berry	449	3.7	+3.7
Total formal votes		12,034	99.1	
Informal votes		107	0.9	
Turnout		12,141	92.2	
Two-party-preferred result
Labor	Bill Prest	7,436	61.8	−3.1
National	Barry Johnson	4,598	38.2	+3.1
Labor hold		Swing	−3.1	

=== Redcliffe ===
1977 Queensland state election: Redcliffe
Party	Candidate	Votes	%	±%
Labor	Roderick Lugton	5,566	37.1	+1.2
National	Jim Houghton	4,797	31.9	−18.6
Liberal	Terry White	4,406	29.3	+29.3
Progress	Gregory Gaffney	246	1.6	+1.6
Total formal votes		15,015	98.6	
Informal votes		218	1.4	
Turnout		15,233	92.6	
Two-party-preferred result
National	Jim Houghton	8,433	56.2	−5.8
Labor	Roderick Lugton	6,582	43.8	+5.8
National hold		Swing	−5.8	

==== By-election ====
- This by-election was caused by the resignation of Jim Houghton. It was held on 1 September 1979.

1979 Redcliffe state by-election
Party	Candidate	Votes	%	±%
Labor	Roderick Lugton	6,084	41.5	+4.4
Liberal	Terry White	4,452	30.4	+1.1
National	John Houghton	2,870	19.6	−12.3
Pensioners	Leonard Dobson	527	3.6	+3.6
Democrats	Susan McCallum	470	3.2	+3.2
Independent	Ray Hollis	171	1.2	+1.2
Progress	Gregory Gaffney	84	0.6	−1.0
Total formal votes		14,658	97.8	−0.8
Informal votes		322	2.2	+0.8
Turnout		14,980	86.8	−5.8
Two-party-preferred result
Liberal	Terry White	7,652	52.2	+52.2
Labor	Roderick Lugton	7,006	47.8	+4.0
Liberal gain from National		Swing	N/A	

=== Redlands ===
1977 Queensland state election: Redlands
Party	Candidate	Votes	%	±%
National	John Goleby	6,436	41.9	+10.1
Labor	Con Sciacca	6,350	41.4	+5.0
Liberal	Peter Hunter	2,558	16.7	−14.0
Total formal votes		15,344	98.6	
Informal votes		224	1.4	
Turnout		15,568	92.8	
Two-party-preferred result
National	John Goleby	8,499	55.4	−4.8
Labor	Con Sciacca	6,845	44.6	+4.8
National hold		Swing	−4.8	

=== Rockhampton ===
1977 Queensland state election: Rockhampton
Party	Candidate	Votes	%	±%
Labor	Keith Wright	10,342	64.6	
Liberal	Douglas Cuddy	2,961	18.5	
National	Charles Doblo	2,356	14.7	
Progress	Graham James	343	2.1	
Total formal votes		16,002	98.9	
Informal votes		180	93.2	
Turnout		16,182	93.2	
Two-party-preferred result
Labor	Keith Wright	10,775	67.3	+8.9
Liberal	Douglas Cuddy	5,227	32.7	−8.9
Labor hold		Swing	+8.9	

=== Rockhampton North ===
1977 Queensland state election: Rockhampton North
Party	Candidate	Votes	%	±%
Labor	Les Yewdale	10,397	64.2	+9.7
Liberal	James Rundle	3,526	21.8	−17.9
National	Donald King	2,261	14.0	+14.0
Total formal votes		16,184	99.1	
Informal votes		147	0.9	
Turnout		16,331	95.3	
Two-party-preferred result
Labor	Les Yewdale	10,714	66.2	+10.1
Liberal	James Rundle	5,470	33.8	−10.1
Labor hold		Swing	+10.1	

=== Roma ===
1977 Queensland state election: Roma
Party	Candidate	Votes	%	±%
National	Ken Tomkins	4,488	63.1	−9.0
Labor	Ronald Saltau	2,326	32.7	+4.8
Progress	James Tomlinson	298	4.2	+4.2
Total formal votes		7,112	98.7	
Informal votes		93	1.3	
Turnout		7,205	90.1	
Two-party-preferred result
National	Ken Tomkins	4,697	66.0	−6.1
Labor	Ronald Saltau	2,415	34.0	+6.1
National hold		Swing	−6.1	

=== Salisbury ===
1977 Queensland state election: Salisbury
Party	Candidate	Votes	%	±%
Liberal	Rosemary Kyburz	7,620	50.7	+14.5
Labor	William Wilcox	7,406	49.3	+6.0
Total formal votes		15,026	97.7	
Informal votes		360	2.3	
Turnout		15,386	91.5	
Liberal hold		Swing	−7.8	

=== Sandgate ===
1977 Queensland state election: Sandgate
Party	Candidate	Votes	%	±%
Labor	Nev Warburton	8,306	56.0	+4.0
Liberal	Donald Connolly	4,385	29.5	−18.5
National	Peter Jackman	2,153	14.5	+14.5
Total formal votes		14,844	98.3	
Informal votes		251	1.7	
Turnout		15,095	92.3	
Two-party-preferred result
Labor	Nev Warburton	8,607	58.0	+6.0
Liberal	Donald Connolly	6,237	42.0	−6.0
Labor hold		Swing	+6.0	

=== Sherwood ===
1977 Queensland state election: Sherwood
Party	Candidate	Votes	%	±%
Liberal	John Herbert	8,804	58.6	−11.1
Labor	Michael Kinnane	5,291	35.2	+8.5
Progress	Judith Forbes	919	6.1	+6.1
Total formal votes		15,014	98.9	
Informal votes		161	1.1	
Turnout		15,175	92.2	
Two-party-preferred result
Liberal	John Herbert	9,447	62.9	−11.1
Labor	Michael Kinnane	5,567	37.1	+11.1
Liberal hold		Swing	−11.1	

==== By-election ====
- This by-election was caused by the death of John Herbert. It was held on 25 November 1978.

1978 Sherwood state by-election
Party	Candidate	Votes	%	±%
Liberal	Angus Innes	6,269	42.2	−16.4
Labor	Michael Kinnane	4,755	32.0	−3.2
Democrats	Stanley Stanley	1,774	11.9	+11.9
National	Desmond Draydon	1,527	10.3	+10.3
Progress	Judith Forbes	290	2.0	−4.1
Independent	Charles Connelly	134	0.9	+0.9
Communist	Murray Broad	73	0.5	+0.5
Nationals QLD QLD Front	Victor Robb	35	0.2	+0.2
Total formal votes		14,857	98.2	−0.7
Informal votes		278	1.8	+0.7
Turnout		15,135	88.2	−4.0
After distribution of preferences
Liberal	Angus Innes	8,012	53.9	
Labor	Michael Kinnane	4,889	32.9	
Democrats	Stanley Stanley	1,956	13.2	
Liberal hold		Swing	N/A	

- Preferences were not distributed to completion.

=== Somerset ===
1977 Queensland state election: Somerset
Party	Candidate	Votes	%	±%
National	Bill Gunn	9,599	62.4	−12.3
Labor	Ronald Hazelden	4,024	26.1	+7.9
Democrats	Thomas Flynn-O'Connor	1,771	11.5	+11.5
Total formal votes		15,394	98.5	
Informal votes		226	1.5	
Turnout		15,620	92.7	
Two-party-preferred result
National	Bill Gunn	10,449	67.9	−8.2
Labor	Ronald Hazelden	4,945	32.1	+8.2
National hold		Swing	−8.2	

=== South Brisbane ===
1977 Queensland state election: South Brisbane
Party	Candidate	Votes	%	±%
Labor	Jim Fouras	7,510	51.9	+6.0
Liberal	David Smith	6,312	43.6	−10.5
Progress	William Everaarps	649	4.5	+4.5
Total formal votes		14,471	97.1	
Informal votes		429	2.9	
Turnout		14,900	88.1	
Two-party-preferred result
Labor	Jim Fouras	7,705	53.2	+7.3
Liberal	David Smith	6,766	46.8	−7.3
Labor gain from Liberal		Swing	+7.3	

=== South Coast ===
1977 Queensland state election: South Coast
Party	Candidate	Votes	%	±%
National	Russ Hinze	8,067	55.4	−10.5
Labor	Ennis Groom	5,367	36.9	+2.8
Independent	James Drabsch	1,123	7.7	+7.7
Total formal votes		14,557	98.0	
Informal votes		289	2.0	
Turnout		14,846	88.5	
Two-party-preferred result
National	Russ Hinze	8,629	59.3	−6.6
Labor	Ennis Groom	5,928	40.7	+6.6
National hold		Swing	−6.6	

=== Southport ===
1977 Queensland state election: Southport
Party	Candidate	Votes	%	±%
National	Norman Rix	5,022	36.2	
Liberal	Peter White	4,738	34.1	
Labor	Reginald Carter	3,967	28.6	
Independent	William Aabraham-Steer	150	1.1	
Total formal votes		13,877	98.3	
Informal votes		243	1.7	
Turnout		14,120	89.2	
Two-party-preferred result
Liberal	Peter White	8,811	63.5	−5.9
Labor	Reginald Carter	5,066	36.5	+5.9
Two-candidate-preferred result
Liberal	Peter White	8,296	59.8	
National	Norman Rix	5,581	40.2	
Liberal gain from National		Swing	N/A	

=== Stafford ===
1977 Queensland state election: Stafford
Party	Candidate	Votes	%	±%
Liberal	Terry Gygar	7,521	50.5	−7.0
Labor	Roy Harvey	7,357	49.5	+12.2
Total formal votes		14,878	98.8	
Informal votes		180	1.2	
Turnout		15,058	92.9	
Liberal hold		Swing	−10.6	

=== Surfers Paradise ===
1977 Queensland state election: Surfers Paradise
Party	Candidate	Votes	%	±%
National	Sir Bruce Small	5,216	38.7	−20.0
Liberal	Bruce Bishop	3,482	25.9	+25.9
Labor	Philip Button	2,960	22.0	−2.1
Democrats	Ronald Holland	1,643	12.2	+12.2
Progress	Donald Wright	164	1.2	+1.2
Total formal votes		13,465	97.7	
Informal votes		318	2.3	
Turnout		13,783	87.6	
Two-party-preferred result
Liberal	Bruce Bishop	8,636	64.1	−8.1
Labor	Philip Button	4,829	35.9	+8.1
Two-candidate-preferred result
Liberal	Bruce Bishop	7,506	55.7	+55.7
National	Sir Bruce Small	5,959	44.3	−28.7
Liberal gain from National		Swing	N/A	

=== Toowong ===
1977 Queensland state election: Toowong
Party	Candidate	Votes	%	±%
Liberal	Charles Porter	7,010	47.8	−20.8
Labor	Athol Kennedy	4,462	30.4	+2.6
Democrats	Michael West	2,732	18.6	+18.6
Progress	Gordon Oulsnam	462	3.2	+3.2
Total formal votes		14,666	98.9	
Informal votes		168	1.1	
Turnout		14,834	89.4	
Two-party-preferred result
Liberal	Charles Porter	8,609	58.7	−12.5
Labor	Athol Kennedy	6,057	41.3	+12.5
Liberal hold		Swing	−12.5	

=== Toowoomba North ===
1977 Queensland state election: Toowoomba North
Party	Candidate	Votes	%	±%
Liberal	John Lockwood	7,092	47.5	−5.8
Labor	Ray Bousen	6,778	45.4	+1.3
Democrats	Clifford Knight	846	5.7	+5.7
Progress	Michael Farrell	220	1.5	+1.5
Total formal votes		14,936	98.8	
Informal votes		174	1.2	
Turnout		15,110	92.5	
Two-party-preferred result
Liberal	John Lockwood	7,714	51.6	−1.7
Labor	Ray Bousen	7,222	48.4	+1.7
Liberal hold		Swing	−1.7	

=== Toowoomba South ===
1977 Queensland state election: Toowoomba South
Party	Candidate	Votes	%	±%
National	John Warner	7,375	49.7	+20.4
Labor	Peter Wood	6,073	40.9	+2.5
Democrats	Michael Clifford	1,388	9.4	+9.4
Total formal votes		14,836	98.8	
Informal votes		178	1.2	
Turnout		15,014	91.6	
Two-party-preferred result
National	John Warner	8,145	54.9	−3.1
Labor	Peter Wood	6,691	45.1	+3.1
National hold		Swing	−3.1	

=== Townsville ===
1977 Queensland state election: Townsville
Party	Candidate	Votes	%	±%
Liberal	Norman Scott-Young	7,235	51.0	−11.0
Labor	Helen Jeffrey	5,769	40.6	+11.5
Independent	Robert Murray	818	5.8	+5.8
Progress	Kelly Crombie	372	2.6	+2.6
Total formal votes		14,194	98.7	
Informal votes		187	1.3	
Turnout		14,381	86.1	
Two-party-preferred result
Liberal	Norman Scott-Young	7,986	56.3	−10.3
Labor	Helen Jeffrey	6,208	43.7	+10.3
Liberal hold		Swing	−10.3	

=== Townsville South ===
1977 Queensland state election: Townsville South
Party	Candidate	Votes	%	±%
Labor	Alex Wilson	6,621	49.4	+8.8
Independent	Tom Aikens	6,173	46.0	−2.5
Independent	Eric Milne	623	4.6	+4.6
Total formal votes		13,417	97.9	
Informal votes		283	2.1	
Turnout		13,700	88.6	
Two-candidate-preferred result
Labor	Alex Wilson	6,837	51.0	+1.6
Independent	Tom Aikens	6,580	49.0	−1.6
Labor gain from Independent		Swing	+1.6	

=== Townsville West ===
1977 Queensland state election: Townsville West
Party	Candidate	Votes	%	±%
Labor	Geoff Smith	6,016	44.2	+1.4
National	Max Hooper	4,259	31.3	+18.0
Liberal	Fred Greensill	2,473	18.2	−5.3
Independent	Lilian Malcolm	873	6.4	+6.4
Total formal votes		13,621	98.9	
Informal votes		144	1.1	
Turnout		13,765	87.8	
Two-party-preferred result
National	Max Hooper	6,931	50.9	−5.0
Labor	Geoff Smith	6,690	49.1	+5.0
National hold		Swing	−5.0	

=== Warrego ===
1977 Queensland state election: Warrego
Party	Candidate	Votes	%	±%
National	Neil Turner	3,798	51.6	−2.2
Labor	Michael Gordon	3,410	46.3	+0.1
Progress	Colin Drake	150	2.0	+2.0
Total formal votes		7,358	99.2	
Informal votes		61	0.8	
Turnout		7,419	89.7	
Two-party-preferred result
National	Neil Turner	3,903	53.0	−0.8
Labor	Michael Gordon	3,455	47.0	+0.8
National hold		Swing	−0.8	

=== Warwick ===
1977 Queensland state election: Warwick
Party	Candidate	Votes	%	±%
National	Des Booth	5,013	52.9	−21.9
Labor	Graham Dorman	2,699	28.5	−3.3
Liberal	Raymond McNamara	1,764	18.6	+18.6
Total formal votes		9,476	98.9	
Informal votes		102	1.1	
Turnout		9,578	93.2	
Two-party-preferred result
National	Des Booth	6,530	68.9	−5.9
Labor	Graham Dorman	2,946	31.1	+5.9
National hold		Swing	−5.9	

=== Wavell ===
1977 Queensland state election: Wavell
Party	Candidate	Votes	%	±%
Labor	Jack Geran	6,738	45.4	+11.4
Liberal	Brian Austin	4,961	33.4	−29.2
National	Charles Mortensen	2,777	18.7	+18.7
Progress	Barry Smith	368	2.5	+2.5
Total formal votes		14,844	98.8	
Informal votes		183	1.2	
Turnout		15,027	92.7	
Two-party-preferred result
Liberal	Brian Austin	7,842	52.8	−11.3
Labor	Jack Geran	7,002	47.2	+11.3
Liberal hold		Swing	−11.3	

=== Whitsunday ===
1977 Queensland state election: Whitsunday
Party	Candidate	Votes	%	±%
National	Ron Camm	6,112	52.7	−9.5
Labor	Stanley Yardley	4,808	41.5	+3.7
Democrats	Robert Fordham	668	5.8	+5.8
Total formal votes		11,588	98.8	
Informal votes		139	1.2	
Turnout		11,727	91.9	
Two-party-preferred result
National	Ron Camm	6,433	55.5	−6.7
Labor	Stanley Yardley	5,155	44.5	+6.7
National hold		Swing	−6.7	

=== Windsor ===
1977 Queensland state election: Windsor
Party	Candidate	Votes	%	±%
Liberal	Bob Moore	7,736	54.5	−6.5
Labor	Louis McKenzie	6,462	45.5	+13.3
Total formal votes		14,198	98.4	
Informal votes		227	1.6	
Turnout		14,425	89.7	
Liberal hold		Swing	−9.3	

=== Wolston ===
1977 Queensland state election: Wolston
Party	Candidate	Votes	%	±%
Labor	Bob Gibbs	8,157	58.2	+10.1
Liberal	Owen Nugent	3,473	24.8	−18.2
National	Ruth Buchanan	2,385	17.0	+17.0
Total formal votes		14,015	97.7	
Informal votes		336	2.3	
Turnout		14,351	91.1	
Two-party-preferred result
Labor	Bob Gibbs	8,491	60.6	+10.5
Liberal	Owen Nugent	5,524	39.4	−10.5
Labor hold		Swing	+10.5	

=== Woodridge ===
1977 Queensland state election: Woodridge
Party	Candidate	Votes	%	±%
Labor	Bill D'Arcy	7,654	49.4	
Liberal	Colin Lamont	5,093	32.9	
National	Douglas Ralston	2,066	13.3	
Independent	Albert Guest	671	4.3	
Total formal votes		15,484	98.1	
Informal votes		306	1.9	
Turnout		15,790	90.6	
Two-party-preferred result
Labor	Bill D'Arcy	8,371	54.1	+11.9
Liberal	Colin Lamont	7,113	45.9	−11.9
Labor gain from Liberal		Swing	+11.9	

=== Wynnum ===
1977 Queensland state election: Wynnum
Party	Candidate	Votes	%	±%
Labor	Eric Shaw	7,290	48.8	+1.8
National	Bill Lamond	5,462	36.6	+6.9
Liberal	Douglas Graeme-Clark	1,087	7.3	−15.3
Democrats	Graham Shuker	1,099	7.4	+7.4
Total formal votes		14,938	98.7	
Informal votes		191	1.3	
Turnout		15,129	92.4	
Two-party-preferred result
Labor	Eric Shaw	8,076	54.1	+4.2
National	Bill Lamond	6,862	45.9	−4.2
Labor gain from National		Swing	+4.2	

=== Yeronga ===
1977 Queensland state election: Yeronga
Party	Candidate	Votes	%	±%
Liberal	Norm Lee	8,110	54.7	−10.8
Labor	Lance Maguire	6,005	40.5	+8.9
Progress	Peter Stevenson	721	4.9	+4.9
Total formal votes		14,836	98.5	
Informal votes		220	1.5	
Turnout		15,056	92.2	
Two-party-preferred result
Liberal	Norm Lee	8,615	58.1	−10.2
Labor	Lance Maguire	6,221	41.9	+10.2
Liberal hold		Swing	−10.2	

== See also ==
- 1977 Queensland state election
- Members of the Queensland Legislative Assembly, 1977–1980
