= Candidates of the 1980 Queensland state election =

The 1980 Queensland state election was held on 29 November 1980.

== Retiring Members ==
=== Labor ===
- Jack Houston MLA (Bulimba)

=== National ===
- Roy Armstrong MLA (Mulgrave)
- Ron Camm MLA (Whitsunday)
- Nev Hewitt MLA (Auburn)
- Tom Newbery MLA (Mirani)

=== Liberal ===
- Fred Campbell MLA (Aspley)
- Charles Porter MLA (Toowong)

== Candidates ==
Sitting members at the time of the election are shown in bold text.

Electorate	Held by	Labor candidate	National candidate	Liberal candidate	Other candidates
Albert	National	Harry Zaphir	**Ivan Gibbs**	John Juett	Reginald Campbell (Ind); Peter Woolley (Dem)
Archerfield	Labor	**Kevin Hooper**	Allen Muir	Alan Bavister	Miriam Cope (PPA); Norman Eather (Ind); Mary Simmons (SPA)
Ashgrove	Liberal	Pat Comben		**John Greenwood**	Cheryl Paton (Dem); Owen Pershouse (Prog)
Aspley	Liberal	John Duncan	Leonard Brydges	Beryce Nelson	Gregory Curry (Prog); Leslie Mundt (Dem)
Auburn	National	Ray Barker	Neville Harper		David Trevilyan (Prog)
Balonne	National	John Barrett	**Don Neal**		
Barambah	National	Brian Hawkes	**Joh Bjelke-Petersen**		Henry Collins (Ind)
Barron River	National	Keith De Lacy	**Martin Tenni**	Lionel Van Dorssen	Bruce Alexander (Dem)
Brisbane Central	Labor	**Brian Davis**		Robert Wright	Murray Broad (CPA)
Bulimba	Labor	Ron McLean		Brian Kirkham	
Bundaberg	Labor	**Jim Blake**	Bryan Conquest	Graham Quirk	Lola Lomax (Dem)
Burdekin	National	Peter Rehbein	**Val Bird**		
Burnett	National	Edgar Roberts	**Claude Wharton**		
Caboolture	National	Frank Hill; John McLoughlin	**Des Frawley**	Virginia Day	John Ferguson (Ind)
Cairns	Labor	**Ray Jones**	Nigel Ette	Francis Hoyal	John Stamp (Ind); Melvin Stewart (Ind)
Callide	National	Alan Morris	**Lindsay Hartwig**		
Carnarvon	National	Johannes De Roo	**Peter McKechnie**		
Chatsworth	Labor	**Terry Mackenroth**		Annette Dunstan	
Condamine	National	Allan Clancey	**Vic Sullivan**		Lindsay Sturgess (Prog)
Cook	Labor	**Bob Scott**	Justin Smith; D. A. Young	Evelyn Scott	
Cooroora	National	Sydney Appleby	**Gordon Simpson**	John Barbeler	Donald Sime (Ind)
Cunningham	National	Robert Ball	**Tony Elliott**	Richard Barnard	
Everton	Labor	**Glen Milliner**	Donald Munro	Brian Burke	Mark Taylor (Dem)
Fassifern	National	Ray Parker	**Selwyn Muller**	Thomas O'Toole	
Flinders	National	Thomas Greenwood	**Bob Katter**		
Greenslopes	Liberal	Graeme Kinnear		**Bill Hewitt**	
Gregory	National	Gordon Saunders	**Bill Glasson**		
Gympie	National	Reginald Lawler	**Len Stephan**	Minas Venardos	William Runge (Prog)
Hinchinbrook	National	Norman Hart	**Ted Row**		Des Bredhauer (Ind); John Williams (Ind)
Ipswich	Liberal	Joseph Sciacca		**Llewellyn Edwards**	James Hayden (Ind); Ian Rintoul (ISP); Victor Robb (NF)
Ipswich West	Labor	**David Underwood**	Neil Russell	Lawrence Pointing	
Isis	National	Michael Edgar	**Lin Powell**	David Cooper	Ronald Cullen (Dem); Mervyn Worth (Dem)
Ithaca	Liberal	Peter Venning		**Col Miller**	
Kurilpa	Liberal	Maurice Dwyer		**Sam Doumany**	Alvan Hawkes (Prog)
Landsborough	National	Peter Byrne	**Mike Ahern**	Paul Kingsford	Barbara Cansdell (Ind)
Lockyer	Liberal	Michael Forde	Terence Day; Tony FitzGerald*	**Tony Bourke**	Michael Berry (Prog); Rae Capon (Dem)
Lytton	Labor	**Tom Burns**		Moyra Bidstrup	
Mackay	Labor	**Ed Casey**	Lionel Bevis	Kevin Dray	
Mansfield	Liberal	John Fraser		**Bill Kaus**	Des McKay (Prog)
Maryborough	Labor	**Brendan Hansen**		Gilbert Alison	Arthur Townsend (Dem)
Merthyr	Liberal	Barbara Dawson		**Don Lane**	
Mirani	National	Conrad Nicolai	Jim Randell	Leonard Goode	John Comerford (Ind)
Mount Coot-tha	Liberal	Graham Kevin		**Bill Lickiss**	David Dalgarno (Dem)
Mount Gravatt	Liberal	Marion McInnes	Ian Henderson	**Guelfi Scassola**	
Mount Isa	National	Tony McGrady	**Angelo Bertoni**	Joyce Boyd	Ray Oldman (Dem)
Mourilyan	National	Bill Eaton	**Vicky Kippin**		
Mulgrave	National	James Moses	Max Menzel	Jean Huxley	
Murrumba	Labor	**Joe Kruger**	Yvonne Chapman	Alfred Shaw	
Nudgee	Labor	**Ken Vaughan**		Gerald Connor	
Nundah	Liberal	Owen Gazzard		**William Knox**	
Peak Downs	National	William Coffey	**Vince Lester**		Anthony Whitfield (Ind); Robin Wright (Prog)
Pine Rivers	Liberal	June Willmot		**Rob Akers**	
Port Curtis	Labor	**Bill Prest**	Michael Crowley	John Mawer; Georgina Pickers	
Redcliffe	Liberal	Roderick Lugton		**Terry White**	
Redlands	National	Con Sciacca	**John Goleby**	Peter Hunter	
Rockhampton	Labor	**Keith Wright**	Garnet Lincoln	Douglas Cuddy	
Rockhampton North	Labor	**Les Yewdale**	Robert Simpson	Keith Harris	Patrick Carroll (Ind); Jeffrey Jones (SPA)
Roma	National	David Bowden	**Ken Tomkins**		
Salisbury	Liberal	Bill Wilcox		**Rosemary Kyburz**	Mary Ellwood (Ind)
Sandgate	Labor	**Nev Warburton**		David Preston	Anthony Catip (Ind); Peter Jackman (Coal)
Sherwood	Liberal	Peter Doyle	Terrence Mahoney	**Angus Innes**	Judith Forbes (Prog)
Somerset	National	Ron Hazelden	**Bill Gunn**	Owen Nugent	
South Brisbane	Labor	**Jim Fouras**		Colin Lamont	Edward Grevsmuhl (Ind)
South Coast	National	Philip Button	**Russ Hinze**	Elizabeth Diamond; Ross Woods	Michael Carey (Coal); James Drabsch (Ind); Julia Freebury (Ind); Robert Neumann (Ind)
Southport	Liberal	Ian Rogers	Doug Jennings	**Peter White**	Kevin Chaffey (Prog); Peter Courtney (Ind); Grace Plunkett (Ind)
Stafford	Liberal	Brian Mellifont		**Terry Gygar**	
Surfers Paradise	Liberal	Khalil Salem	Rob Borbidge	**Bruce Bishop**	Eileen Peters (Ind)
Toowong	Liberal	Gailene Harrison	Peter Forrest	Ian Prentice	Michael West (Dem)
Toowoomba North	Liberal	Lindsay Jones		**John Lockwood**	
Toowoomba South	National	Ron Fraser	**John Warner**	Colin Brimblecombe	Michael Clifford (Dem)
Townsville	Liberal	Brian Dobinson	Phillip Morton	**Norman Scott-Young**	
Townsville South	Labor	**Alex Wilson**	Alan Metcalfe	Hector Garrick	Francis Rossiter (Ind)
Townsville West	National	Geoff Smith	**Max Hooper**		Frank Bishop (CPA)
Warrego	National	Michael Gordon	**Neil Turner**		
Warwick	National	Stephen Fazackerley	**Des Booth**		Maria Heyboer (Dem)
Wavell	Liberal	Jack Geran		**Brian Austin**	
Whitsunday	National	Stanley Yardley	Geoff Muntz		
Windsor	Liberal	Frank Melit		**Bob Moore**	Louis McKenzie (Ind)
Wolston	Labor	**Bob Gibbs**	Roy Buchanan	Bob Harper	
Woodridge	Labor	**Bill D'Arcy**		Douglas Dagleish	Robert Bartlett (Ind); Jack Davis (Ind); Anne Glew (Ind); Robert Webb (Dem)
Wynnum	Labor	**Eric Shaw**	Merven Hoppner	Vanessa Gregory	
Yeronga	Liberal	Kitchener Farrell		**Norm Lee**	

== See also ==
- 1980 Queensland state election
- Members of the Queensland Legislative Assembly, 1977–1980
- Members of the Queensland Legislative Assembly, 1980–1983
- List of political parties in Australia
