= Candidates of the 1977 Queensland state election =

State election

The 1977 Queensland state election was held on 12 November 1977.

== Retiring Members ==
- Note: Clayfield Liberal MLA Ivan Brown and Greenslopes Liberal MLA Keith Hooper had both died prior to the election; no by-elections were held.

=== Labor ===
- Harry Dean MLA (Sandgate)
- Evan Marginson MLA (Wolston)
- Jack Melloy MLA (Nudgee)

=== National ===
- David Cory MLA (Warwick)

=== Liberal ===
- Geoff Chinchen MLA (Mount Gravatt)
- Arthur Crawford MLA (Wavell)
- Harold Lowes MLA (Brisbane)

== Candidates ==
Sitting members at the time of the election are shown in bold text.

Electorate	Held by	Labor candidate	Coalition candidate	Other candidates
Albert	National	Cecil Clark; Denis O'Connell	**Ivan Gibbs** (Nat)	Ace Drabsch (Ind); Alex McMillan (Ind)
Archerfield	Labor	**Kevin Hooper**	John Armstrong (Nat); Bevan Fleming (Lib); George Kalaja (Nat)	
Ashgrove	Liberal	Pat Comben	**John Greenwood** (Lib)	Gary Sturgess (Prog)
Aspley	Liberal	Philip Gray	**Fred Campbell** (Lib)	
Auburn	National	Jeffrey Lenz	**Nev Hewitt** (Nat)	David Trevilyan (Prog)
Balonne	National	Robert Saltau	**Don Neal** (Nat)	
Barambah	National	John Hunt	**Joh Bjelke-Petersen** (Nat)	
Barron River	National	Keith De Lacy	**Martin Tenni** (Nat)	
Brisbane Central	Liberal	Brian Davis	**Dennis Young** (Lib)	Dennis Bailey (SPA)
Bulimba	Labor	**Jack Houston**	John Leggoe (Lib)	
Bundaberg	Labor	Jim Blake	Bryan Conquest (Nat); John Heaps (Lib)	**Lou Jensen** (Ind)
Burdekin	National	Alex Brown	**Val Bird** (Nat)	
Burnett	National	Andrew Jackson	**Claude Wharton** (Nat)	
Caboolture	National	Francis Freemantle; John McLoughlin	**Des Frawley** (Nat)	
Cairns	Labor	**Ray Jones**	Charles Bellairs (Lib); Victor Piccone (Nat)	Neville Modystack (Dem)
Callide	National	John O'Sullivan	**Lindsay Hartwig** (Nat)	
Carnarvon	National	Colin Batterham	**Peter McKechnie** (Nat)	
Chatsworth	Liberal	Terry Mackenroth	**David Byrne** (Lib)	
Condamine	National	Noel Wormald	**Vic Sullivan** (Nat)	Lloyd Drabsch (Ind); Lindsay Sturgess (Prog)
Cook	National	Bob Scott	**Eric Deeral** (Nat)	Ted Loban (AAP)
Cooroora	National	Donald Sime	**Gordon Simpson*** (Nat); John Williams (Lib)	
Cunningham	National	Trevor Peacock	**Tony Elliott** (Nat)	Valerie O'Phee (Dem)
Everton	Liberal	Glen Milliner	**Brian Lindsay** (Lib)	Owen C. Pershouse (Prog)
Fassifern	National	Stephen Limbach	**Selwyn Muller** (Nat)	
Flinders	National	Edward Schunemann	**Bob Katter** (Nat)	Owen H. Pershouse (Prog)
Greenslopes	Liberal	Lewin Blazevich	Noel Cannon (Nat); **Bill Hewitt*** (Lib)	David Anning (Dem)
Gregory	National	Gordon Saunders	**Bill Glasson** (Nat)	
Gympie	National	Reginald Lawler	**Max Hodges** (Nat)	William Runge (Prog)
Hinchinbrook	National	James Byrne	**Ted Row** (Nat)	
Ipswich	Liberal	Joseph Sciacca	**Llewellyn Edwards** (Lib)	
Ipswich West	National	David Underwood	**Albert Hales** (Nat); Barry Spark (Lib)	
Isis	National	Phillip Barnsley	**Lin Powell*** (Nat); Mary Spurway (Lib)	James Dobson (Ind)
Ithaca	Liberal	Francis Gilbert	**Col Miller** (Lib)	Paul Rackemann (Prog)
Kurilpa	Liberal	John Saunders	**Sam Doumany** (Lib)	Fred Drake (Prog); Stanley Stanley (Dem)
Landsborough	National	Joan Kiely	**Mike Ahern** (Nat)	
Lockyer	Liberal	Norma Jones	**Tony Bourke** (Lib)	Brian Otto (Dem); William Pechey (Ind)
Lytton	Labor	**Tom Burns**	Rodney Bristow (Lib)	
Mackay	Independent	**Ed Casey**	Jeanette Bevan (Lib); Fitzroy McLean (Nat)	Sebastian Torrisi (Ind)
Mansfield	Liberal	Harry Zaphir	**Bill Kaus** (Lib)	John McKay (Prog)
Maryborough	Liberal	Brendan Hansen	**Gilbert Alison** (Lib)	
Merthyr	Liberal	Barbara Dawson	**Don Lane** (Lib)	Harold Scruton (Prog)
Mirani	National	Conrad Nicolai	**Tom Newbery** (Nat)	
Mount Coot-tha	Liberal	Jon Stanford	**Bill Lickiss** (Lib)	Wallace Younger (Prog)
Mount Gravatt	Liberal	George Harvey	Ian Henderson (Nat); Guelfi Scassola* (Lib)	Desmond McKay (Prog)
Mount Isa	National	Alex Pavusa	**Angelo Bertoni** (Nat)	Anthony Assan (Ind); Nelson Gavenor (Ind); Keith Spanner (Prog)
Mourilyan	National	Peter Moore	**Vicky Kippin** (Nat)	John Jones (Ind)
Mulgrave	National	Bill Eaton	**Roy Armstrong** (Nat)	
Murrumba	National	Joe Kruger	Agnes Campbell (Nat); Brian Frawley (Nat); Stephen Thomason (Lib)	
Nudgee	Labor	Ken Vaughan	Denis Simonyi (Lib)	
Nundah	Liberal	Leonard Hingley	**William Knox** (Lib)	
Peak Downs	National	Leonard Nicholson	**Vince Lester** (Nat)	
Pine Rivers	Liberal	Ken Leese	**Rob Akers** (Lib)	Rodney Jeanneret (Prog)
Port Curtis	Labor	**Bill Prest**	Barry Johnson (Nat); John Mawer (Lib)	Michael Berry (Prog)
Redcliffe	National	Roderick Lugton	**Jim Houghton*** (Nat); Terry White (Lib)	Gregory Gaffney (Prog)
Redlands	National	Con Sciacca	**John Goleby*** (Nat); Peter Hunter (Lib)	
Rockhampton	Labor	**Keith Wright**	Douglas Cuddy (Lib); Charles Doblo (Nat)	Graham James (Prog)
Rockhampton North	Labor	**Les Yewdale**	Donald King (Nat); James Rundle (Lib)	
Roma	National	Ronald Saltau	**Ken Tomkins** (Nat)	James Tomlinson (Prog)
Salisbury	Liberal	William Wilcox	**Rosemary Kyburz** (Lib)	
Sandgate	Labor	Nev Warburton	Donald Connolly (Lib); Peter Jackman (Nat)	
Sherwood	Liberal	Michael Kinnane	**John Herbert** (Lib)	Judith Forbes (Prog)
Somerset	National	Ronald Hazelden	**Bill Gunn** (Nat)	Thomas Flynn-O'Connor (Dem)
South Brisbane	Liberal	Jim Fouras	David Smith (Lib)	William Everaarps (Prog)
South Coast	National	Ennis Groom	**Russ Hinze** (Nat)	James Drabsch (Ind)
Southport	National	Reginald Carter	Norman Rix (Nat); Peter White* (Lib)	William Aabraham-Steer (Ind)
Stafford	Liberal	Roy Harvey	**Terry Gygar** (Lib)	
Surfers Paradise	National	Philip Button	Bruce Bishop* (Lib); **Sir Bruce Small** (Nat)	Ronald Holland (Dem); Donald Wright (Prog)
Toowong	Liberal	Athol Kennedy	**Charles Porter** (Lib)	Gordon Oulsnam (Prog); Michael West (Dem)
Toowoomba North	Liberal	Ray Bousen	**John Lockwood** (Lib)	Michael Farrell (Prog); Clifford Knight (Dem)
Toowoomba South	National	Peter Wood	**John Warner** (Nat)	Michael Clifford (Dem)
Townsville	Liberal	Helen Jeffrey	**Norman Scott-Young** (Lib)	Kelly Crombie (Prog); Robert Murray (Ind)
Townsville South	Independent	Alex Wilson		**Tom Aikens** (Ind); Eric Milne (Ind)
Townsville West	National	Geoff Smith	Fred Greensill (Lib); **Max Hooper*** (Nat)	Lilian Malcolm (Ind)
Warrego	National	Michael Gordon	**Neil Turner** (Nat)	Colin Drake (Prog)
Warwick	National	Graham Dorman	Des Booth* (Nat); Raymond McNamara (Lib)	
Wavell	Liberal	Jack Geran	Brian Austin* (Lib); Charles Mortensen (Nat)	Barry Smith (Prog)
Whitsunday	National	Stanley Yardley	**Ron Camm** (Nat)	Robert Fordham (Dem)
Windsor	Liberal	Louis McKenzie	**Bob Moore** (Lib)	
Wolston	Labor	Bob Gibbs	Ruth Buchanan (Nat); Owen Nugent (Lib)	
Woodridge	Liberal	Bill D'Arcy	**Colin Lamont** (Lib); Douglas Ralston (Nat)	Albert Guest (Ind)
Wynnum	National	Eric Shaw	Douglas Graeme-Clark (Lib); **Bill Lamond** (Nat)	Graham Shuker (Dem)
Yeronga	Liberal	Lance Maguire	**Norm Lee** (Lib)	Peter Stevenson (Prog)

== See also ==
- 1977 Queensland state election
- Members of the Queensland Legislative Assembly, 1974–1977
- Members of the Queensland Legislative Assembly, 1977–1980
- List of political parties in Australia
