= Electoral results for the district of Mourilyan =

Queensland, Australia, district election results

This is a list of electoral results for the electoral district of Mourilyan in Queensland state elections.

== Members for Mourilyan ==
Member	Party	Term
Peter Byrne	Labor	1950–1969
Peter Moore	Labor	1969–1974
Vicky Kippin	National	1974–1980
Bill Eaton	Labor	1980–1992

== Election results ==
=== Elections in the 1980s ===
1989 Queensland state election: Mourilyan
Party	Candidate	Votes	%	±%
Labor	Bill Eaton	6,773	54.2	+3.2
National	Malcolm Taylor	4,107	32.8	−5.0
Independent	Philip Condon	1,628	13.0	+13.0
Total formal votes		12,508	97.1	−1.6
Informal votes		378	2.9	+1.6
Turnout		12,886	90.9	+0.9
Two-party-preferred result
Labor	Bill Eaton	7,280	58.2	+4.1
National	Malcolm Taylor	5,228	41.8	−4.1
Labor hold		Swing	+4.1	

1986 Queensland state election: Mourilyan
Party	Candidate	Votes	%	±%
Labor	Bill Eaton	5,894	51.0	−1.1
National	Malcolm Taylor	4,376	37.8	−8.9
Liberal	Andrea Walduck	1,295	11.2	+11.2
Total formal votes		11,565	98.6	
Informal votes		158	1.4	
Turnout		11,723	90.0	
Two-party-preferred result
Labor	Bill Eaton	6,257	54.1	+2.0
National	Malcolm Taylor	5,308	45.9	−2.0
Labor hold		Swing	+2.0	

1983 Queensland state election: Mourilyan
Party	Candidate	Votes	%	±%
Labor	Bill Eaton	5,510	52.1	+0.8
National	Vicky Kippin	4,941	46.7	−2.0
Independent	Ronald Nielsen	135	1.3	+1.3
Total formal votes		10,586	99.0	+0.2
Informal votes		104	1.0	−0.2
Turnout		10,690	93.3	+3.0
Two-party-preferred result
Labor	Bill Eaton	5,578	52.7	+1.4
National	Vicky Kippin	5,008	47.3	−1.4
Labor hold		Swing	+1.4	

1980 Queensland state election: Mourilyan
Party	Candidate	Votes	%	±%
Labor	Bill Eaton	5,139	51.3	+3.9
National	Vicky Kippin	4,875	48.7	+1.6
Total formal votes		10,014	98.8	+0.5
Informal votes		117	1.2	−0.5
Turnout		10,131	90.3	−2.3
Labor gain from National		Swing	+1.6	

=== Elections in the 1970s ===
1977 Queensland state election: Mourilyan
Party	Candidate	Votes	%	±%
Labor	Peter Moore	4,688	47.4	+0.1
National	Vicky Kippin	4,666	47.1	−1.2
Independent	John Jones	544	5.5	+5.5
Total formal votes		9,898	98.3	
Informal votes		172	1.7	
Turnout		10,070	92.6	
Two-party-preferred result
National	Vicky Kippin	4,977	50.3	−1.4
Labor	Peter Moore	4,921	49.7	+1.4
National hold		Swing	−1.4	

1974 Queensland state election: Mourilyan
Party	Candidate	Votes	%	±%
National	Vicky Kippin	4,772	48.3	+15.7
Labor	Peter Moore	4,674	47.3	−8.4
Queensland Labor	Salvatore Nucifora	432	4.4	−7.3
Total formal votes		9,878	98.5	+0.2
Informal votes		151	1.5	−0.2
Turnout		10,029	89.5	−1.9
Two-party-preferred result
National	Vicky Kippin	5,102	51.7	+8.9
Labor	Peter Moore	4,776	48.3	−8.9
National gain from Labor		Swing	+8.9	

1972 Queensland state election: Mourilyan
Party	Candidate	Votes	%	±%
Labor	Peter Moore	5,039	55.7	+2.4
Country	Peter Mitchell	2,949	32.6	−1.0
Queensland Labor	Geoffrey Higham	1,054	11.7	−1.5
Total formal votes		9,042	98.3	
Informal votes		160	1.7	
Turnout		9,202	91.4	
Two-party-preferred result
Labor	Peter Moore	5,169	57.2	+4.6
Country	Peter Mitchell	3,874	42.8	−4.6
Labor hold		Swing	+4.6	

=== Elections in the 1960s ===
1969 Queensland state election: Mourilyan
Party	Candidate	Votes	%	±%
Labor	Peter Moore	4,451	53.3	−2.9
Country	Arnold Palmer	2,807	33.6	+2.1
Queensland Labor	Geoffrey Higham	1,100	13.2	+0.9
Total formal votes		8,358	97.4	−0.2
Informal votes		226	2.6	+0.2
Turnout		8,584	93.1	+0.3
Two-party-preferred result
Labor	Peter Moore	4,752	56.9	−1.6
Country	Arnold Palmer	3,606	43.1	+1.6
Labor hold		Swing	−1.6	

1966 Queensland state election: Mourilyan
Party	Candidate	Votes	%	±%
Labor	Peter Byrne	4,683	56.2	−2.5
Country	Alfred Martinuzzi	2,623	31.5	+1.1
Queensland Labor	Geoffrey Higham	1,021	12.3	+1.4
Total formal votes		8,327	97.6	−0.1
Informal votes		202	2.4	+0.1
Turnout		8,529	93.4	−1.1
Two-party-preferred result
Labor	Peter Byrne	4,873	58.5	−2.3
Country	Alfred Martinuzzi	3,454	41.5	+2.3
Labor hold		Swing	−2.3	

1963 Queensland state election: Mourilyan
Party	Candidate	Votes	%	±%
Labor	Peter Byrne	4,744	58.7	+4.1
Country	Alf Martinuzzi	2,456	30.4	−5.5
Queensland Labor	Geoff Higham	877	10.9	+1.4
Total formal votes		8,077	97.7	−0.9
Informal votes		191	2.3	+0.9
Turnout		8,268	94.5	+3.0
Two-party-preferred result
Labor	Peter Byrne	4,907	60.8	
Country	Alf Martinuzzi	3,170	39.2	
Labor hold		Swing	N/A	

1960 Queensland state election: Mourilyan
Party	Candidate	Votes	%	±%
Labor	Peter Byrne	4,417	54.6	
Country	Edmund Webb	2,905	35.9	
Queensland Labor	Geoff Higham	770	9.5	
Total formal votes		8,092	98.6	
Informal votes		115	1.4	
Turnout		8,207	91.5	
Labor hold		Swing		

=== Elections in the 1950s ===
1957 Queensland state election: Mourilyan
Party	Candidate	Votes	%	±%
Labor	Peter Byrne	3,246	42.2	−17.3
Country	Edmund Webb	2,619	34.1	−4.1
Queensland Labor	Alfred Drew	1,740	22.6	+22.6
Independent	Cecil Evans	81	1.1	+1.1
Total formal votes		7,686	98.6	−0.3
Informal votes		112	1.4	+0.3
Turnout		7,798	95.9	+2.5
Labor hold		Swing	−5.5	

1956 Queensland state election: Mourilyan
Party	Candidate	Votes	%	±%
Labor	Peter Byrne	4,468	59.5	−7.8
Country	Eric Fox	2,872	38.2	+8.6
Communist	John Twaddle	174	2.3	−0.8
Total formal votes		7,514	98.9	−0.3
Informal votes		86	1.1	+0.3
Turnout		7,600	93.4	−0.7
Labor hold		Swing	−8.3	

1953 Queensland state election: Mourilyan
Party	Candidate	Votes	%	±%
Labor	Peter Byrne	4,867	67.3	+23.8
Country	John Castor	2,142	29.6	−9.0
Communist	Bertie Clark	227	3.1	−0.6
Total formal votes		7,236	99.2	0.0
Informal votes		58	0.8	0.0
Turnout		7,294	94.1	+2.5
Labor hold		Swing	+16.4	

1950 Queensland state election: Mourilyan
Party	Candidate	Votes	%	±%
Labor	Peter Byrne	3,168	43.5	
Country	Andrew Laurie	2,812	38.6	
NQ Labor	William Batchelor	1,028	14.1	
Communist	Les Sullivan	271	3.7	
Total formal votes		7,279	99.2	
Informal votes		60	0.8	
Turnout		7,339	91.6	
Labor hold		Swing		
