= Members of the Queensland Legislative Assembly, 1980–1983 =

This is a list of members of the 43rd Legislative Assembly of Queensland from 1980 to 1983, as elected at the 1980 state election held on 29 November 1980.

Name	Party	Electorate	Term in office
Hon Mike Ahern	National	Landsborough	1968–1990
Rob Akers	Liberal	Pine Rivers	1974–1983
Hon Brian Austin	Liberal	Wavell	1977–1989
Hon Angelo Bertoni	National	Mount Isa	1974–1983
Hon Val Bird	National	Burdekin	1969–1983
Hon Joh Bjelke-Petersen	National	Barambah	1947–1987
Jim Blake	Labor	Bundaberg	1968–1974, 1977–1983
Des Booth	National	Warwick	1977–1992
Rob Borbidge	National	Surfers Paradise	1980–2001
Tom Burns	Labor	Lytton	1972–1996
Ed Casey	Labor	Mackay	1969–1995
Bill D'Arcy	Labor	Woodridge	1972–1974, 1977–2000
Brian Davis	Labor	Brisbane Central	1969–1974, 1977–1989
Hon Sam Doumany	Liberal	Kurilpa	1974–1983
Bill Eaton	Labor	Mourilyan	1980–1992
Hon Dr Llewellyn Edwards	Liberal	Ipswich	1972–1983
Hon Tony Elliott	National	Cunningham	1974–2001
Tony FitzGerald	National	Lockyer	1980–1998
Jim Fouras	Labor	South Brisbane	1977–1986, 1989–2006
Des Frawley	National	Caboolture	1972–1983
Hon Ivan Gibbs	National	Albert	1974–1989
Bob Gibbs	Labor	Wolston	1977–1999
Hon Bill Glasson	National	Gregory	1974–1989
Hon John Goleby	National	Redlands	1974–1985
John Greenwood	Liberal	Ashgrove	1974–1983
Hon Bill Gunn	National	Somerset	1972–1992
Terry Gygar	Liberal	Stafford	1974–1983, 1984–1989
Brendan Hansen	Labor	Maryborough	1977–1983
Hon Neville Harper	National	Auburn	1980–1992
Lindsay Hartwig	National/Independent ^{[1]}	Callide	1972–1986
Hon Bill Hewitt	Liberal	Greenslopes	1966–1983
Hon Russ Hinze	National	South Coast	1966–1988
Kevin Hooper	Labor	Archerfield	1972–1984
Angus Innes	Liberal	Sherwood	1978–1990
Doug Jennings	National	Southport	1980–1987
Ray Jones	Labor	Cairns	1965–1983
Bob Katter	National	Flinders	1974–1992
Bill Kaus	Liberal/National ^{[2]}	Mansfield	1966–1986
Hon Sir William Knox	Liberal	Nundah	1957–1989
Joe Kruger	Labor	Murrumba	1977–1986
Rosemary Kyburz	Liberal	Salisbury	1974–1983
Hon Don Lane	Liberal	Merthyr	1971–1989
Hon Norm Lee	Liberal	Yeronga	1964–1989
Hon Vince Lester	National	Peak Downs	1974–2004
Hon Bill Lickiss	Liberal	Mount Coot-tha	1963–1989
Dr John Lockwood	Liberal	Toowoomba North	1974–1983
Terry Mackenroth	Labor	Chatsworth	1977–2005
Peter McKechnie	National	Carnarvon	1974–1989
Ron McLean	Labor	Bulimba	1980–1992
Max Menzel	National	Mulgrave	1980–1989
Hon Col Miller	Liberal	Ithaca	1966–1986
Glen Milliner	Labor	Everton	1977–1998
Bob Moore	Liberal/National ^{[2]}	Windsor	1969–1983
Selwyn Muller	National	Fassifern	1969–1983
Hon Geoff Muntz	National	Whitsunday	1980–1989
Don Neal	National	Balonne	1972–1992
Beryce Nelson	Liberal	Aspley	1980–1983, 1986–1989
Hon Lin Powell	National	Isis	1974–1989
Ian Prentice	Liberal	Toowong	1980–1983
Bill Prest	Labor	Port Curtis	1976–1992
Jim Randell	National	Mirani	1980–1994
Ted Row	National	Hinchinbrook	1972–1989
Guelfi Scassola	Liberal	Mount Gravatt	1977–1983
Bob Scott	Labor	Cook	1977–1989
Dr Norman Scott-Young	Liberal	Townsville	1972–1983
Eric Shaw	Labor	Wynnum	1977–1989
Gordon Simpson	National	Cooroora	1974–1989
Geoff Smith	Labor	Townsville West	1980–1998
Len Stephan	National	Gympie	1979–2001
Hon Vic Sullivan	National	Condamine	1960–1983
Hon Martin Tenni	National	Barron River	1974–1989
Hon Ken Tomkins	National	Roma	1967–1983
Hon Neil Turner	National	Warrego	1974–1986, 1991–1998
David Underwood	Labor	Ipswich West	1977–1989
Ken Vaughan	Labor	Nudgee	1977–1995
Nev Warburton	Labor	Sandgate	1977–1992
Hon John Warner	National	Toowoomba South	1974–1986
Hon Claude Wharton	National	Burnett	1960–1986
Hon Terry White	Liberal	Redcliffe	1979–1989
Alex Wilson	Labor	Townsville South	1977–1986
Keith Wright	Labor	Rockhampton	1969–1984
Les Yewdale	Labor	Rockhampton North	1972–1989

^{1} The National member for Callide, Lindsay Hartwig, was expelled from his party in 1981 following his trenchant criticism of the Premier and the party in the media and in Parliament. He served out the remainder of his term as an independent.
^{2} The Liberal members for Mansfield and Windsor, Bill Kaus and Bob Moore respectively, joined the National Party on 13 July 1983.

== See also ==
- 1980 Queensland state election
- Premier: Joh Bjelke-Petersen (National Party) (1968–1987)
