= Electoral results for the district of Yeronga =

Queensland, Australia, district election results

This is a list of electoral results for the electoral district of Yeronga in Queensland state elections.

== Members for Yeronga ==
Member	Party	Term
Winston Noble	Liberal	1950–1964
Norm Lee	Liberal	1964–1989
Matt Foley	Labor	1989–2001

== Election results ==
=== Elections in the 1990s ===
1998 Queensland state election: Yeronga
Party	Candidate	Votes	%	±%
Labor	Matt Foley	9,979	52.63	+1.71
Liberal	John Webster	5,323	28.08	−13.28
One Nation	Vanessa Pacitto	2,532	13.36	+13.36
Greens	Stephen Burchall	1,006	5.31	+5.31
Reform	Rick Stapleton	119	0.63	+0.63
Total formal votes		18,959	98.58	+0.40
Informal votes		274	1.42	−0.40
Turnout		19,233	92.82	+1.51
Two-party-preferred result
Labor	Matt Foley	11,218	62.47	+7.87
Liberal	John Webster	6,739	37.53	−7.87
Labor hold		Swing	+7.87	

1995 Queensland state election: Yeronga
Party	Candidate	Votes	%	±%
Labor	Matt Foley	9,466	50.92	−12.55
Liberal	Salli Aitken	7,689	41.36	+4.83
Independent	Bernadette Le Goullon	966	5.20	+5.20
Confederate Action	Leonce Kealy	468	2.52	+2.52
Total formal votes		18,589	98.18	+0.79
Informal votes		345	1.82	−0.79
Turnout		18,934	91.31	−0.18
Two-party-preferred result
Labor	Matt Foley	10,003	54.60	−8.87
Liberal	Salli Aitken	8,316	45.40	+8.87
Labor hold		Swing	−8.87	

1992 Queensland state election: Yeronga
Party	Candidate	Votes	%	±%
Labor	Matt Foley	12,410	63.5	+4.3
Liberal	Iain Moore	7,142	36.5	+6.8
Total formal votes		19,552	97.4	
Informal votes		524	2.6	
Turnout		20,076	91.5	
Labor hold		Swing	+2.9	

=== Elections in the 1980s ===
1989 Queensland state election: Yeronga
Party	Candidate	Votes	%	±%
Labor	Matt Foley	11,043	58.4	+18.1
Liberal	Cliff Dee	6,067	32.1	+2.7
National	Gordon Fisher	1,798	9.5	−14.7
Total formal votes		18,908	97.8	−0.1
Informal votes		418	2.2	+0.1
Turnout		19,326	92.0	+0.3
Two-party-preferred result
Labor	Matt Foley	11,175	59.1	+14.8
Liberal	Cliff Dee	7,733	40.9	−14.8
Labor gain from Liberal		Swing	+14.8	

1986 Queensland state election: Yeronga
Party	Candidate	Votes	%	±%
Labor	John Mickel	7,396	40.3	−6.8
Liberal	Norm Lee	5,386	29.4	−23.5
National	Peter Castrisos	4,430	24.2	+24.2
Independent	Kitchener Farrell	1,125	6.1	+6.1
Total formal votes		18,337	97.9	+0.2
Informal votes		389	2.1	−0.2
Turnout		18,726	91.7	−1.0
Two-party-preferred result
Liberal	Norm Lee	10,213	55.7	+1.3
Labor	John Mickel	8,124	44.3	−1.3
Liberal hold		Swing	+1.3	

1983 Queensland state election: Yeronga
Party	Candidate	Votes	%	±%
Liberal	Norm Lee	7,788	52.9	−4.1
Labor	Kitchener Farrell	6,932	47.1	+4.1
Total formal votes		14,720	97.7	−0.3
Informal votes		343	2.3	+0.3
Turnout		15,063	92.7	+2.3
Liberal hold		Swing	−4.1	

1980 Queensland state election: Yeronga
Party	Candidate	Votes	%	±%
Liberal	Norm Lee	8,283	57.0	+2.3
Labor	Kitchener Farrell	6,237	43.0	+2.5
Total formal votes		14,520	98.0	−0.5
Informal votes		300	2.0	+0.5
Turnout		14,820	90.4	−1.8
Liberal hold		Swing	−1.1	

=== Elections in the 1970s ===
1977 Queensland state election: Yeronga
Party	Candidate	Votes	%	±%
Liberal	Norm Lee	8,110	54.7	−10.8
Labor	Lance Maguire	6,005	40.5	+8.9
Progress	Peter Stevenson	721	4.9	+4.9
Total formal votes		14,836	98.5	
Informal votes		220	1.5	
Turnout		15,056	92.2	
Two-party-preferred result
Liberal	Norm Lee	8,615	58.1	−10.2
Labor	Lance Maguire	6,221	41.9	+10.2
Liberal hold		Swing	−10.2	

1974 Queensland state election: Yeronga
Party	Candidate	Votes	%	±%
Liberal	Norm Lee	7,954	65.5	+17.2
Labor	Spencer Higgins	3,842	31.6	−13.3
Queensland Labor	Andrew Jackson	354	2.9	−3.8
Total formal votes		12,150	98.6	−0.1
Informal votes		174	1.4	+0.1
Turnout		12,324	89.0	−5.3
Two-party-preferred result
Liberal	Norm Lee	8,248	67.9	+13.6
Labor	Spencer Higgins	3,902	32.1	−13.6
Liberal hold		Swing	+13.6	

1972 Queensland state election: Yeronga
Party	Candidate	Votes	%	±%
Liberal	Norm Lee	5,546	48.3	−1.2
Labor	Clem Jones	5,156	44.9	+5.2
Queensland Labor	Harry Wright	770	6.7	−4.0
Total formal votes		11,472	98.7	
Informal votes		156	1.3	
Turnout		11,628	94.3	
Two-party-preferred result
Liberal	Norm Lee	6,234	54.3	−5.7
Labor	Clem Jones	5,238	45.7	+5.7
Liberal hold		Swing	−5.7	

=== Elections in the 1960s ===
1969 Queensland state election: Yeronga
Party	Candidate	Votes	%	±%
Liberal	Norm Lee	5,311	49.5	−1.5
Labor	Malcolm Campbell	4,261	39.7	+0.9
Queensland Labor	Jonyth Mapstone	1,149	10.7	+0.4
Total formal votes		10,721	98.5	+0.1
Informal votes		159	1.5	−0.1
Turnout		10,880	93.1	−1.6
Two-party-preferred result
Liberal	Norm Lee	6,280	58.6	−0.7
Labor	Malcolm Campbell	4,441	41.4	+0.7
Liberal hold		Swing	−0.7	

1966 Queensland state election: Yeronga
Party	Candidate	Votes	%	±%
Liberal	Norm Lee	5,499	51.0	−1.2
Labor	Jack Davis	4,180	38.8	+1.9
Queensland Labor	John Lamberth	1,106	10.3	+0.2
Total formal votes		10,785	98.4	−0.1
Informal votes		177	1.6	+0.1
Turnout		10,962	94.7	−0.2
Two-party-preferred result
Liberal	Norm Lee	6,399	59.3	−0.7
Labor	Jack Davis	4,386	40.7	+0.7
Liberal hold		Swing	−0.7	

1963 Queensland state election: Yeronga
Party	Candidate	Votes	%	±%
Liberal	Winston Noble	5,621	52.2	+0.8
Labor	Cyril Cusack	3,970	36.9	−0.7
Queensland Labor	Mary Andrews	1,089	10.1	−0.9
Social Credit	Roy Phipps	81	0.8	+0.8
Total formal votes		10,761	98.5	−0.4
Informal votes		158	1.5	+0.4
Turnout		10,919	94.9	+1.0
Two-party-preferred result
Liberal	Winston Noble	6,452	60.0	
Labor	Cyril Cusack	4,309	40.0	
Liberal hold		Swing	N/A	

1960 Queensland state election: Yeronga
Party	Candidate	Votes	%	±%
Liberal	Winston Noble	5,594	51.4	
Labor	John O'Donnell	4,085	37.6	
Queensland Labor	Francis Wickings	1,196	11.0	
Total formal votes		10,875	98.9	
Informal votes		124	1.1	
Turnout		10,999	93.9	
Liberal hold		Swing		

=== Elections in the 1950s ===
1957 Queensland state election: Yeronga
Party	Candidate	Votes	%	±%
Liberal	Winston Noble	6,660	54.6	−3.3
Labor	Roy Dent	2,903	23.8	−16.7
Queensland Labor	William Quaill	2,635	21.6	+21.6
Total formal votes		12,198	99.2	+0.2
Informal votes		98	0.8	−0.2
Turnout		12,296	95.7	+1.6
Liberal hold		Swing	+10.7	

1956 Queensland state election: Yeronga
Party	Candidate	Votes	%	±%
Liberal	Winston Noble	6,974	57.9	+6.2
Labor	Norman Stutz	4,875	40.5	−8.3
Independent	Jim Dwyer	191	1.6	+1.6
Total formal votes		12,040	99.0	+0.2
Informal votes		116	1.0	−0.2
Turnout		12,156	94.1	−1.2
Liberal hold		Swing	+7.5	

1953 Queensland state election: Yeronga
Party	Candidate	Votes	%	±%
Liberal	Winston Noble	6,041	51.2	−7.6
Labor	Tom Doyle	5,767	48.8	+7.6
Total formal votes		11,808	98.8	+0.3
Informal votes		146	1.2	−0.3
Turnout		11,954	95.3	+1.7
Liberal hold		Swing	−7.6	

1950 Queensland state election: Yeronga
Party	Candidate	Votes	%	±%
Liberal	Winston Noble	6,504	58.8	
Labor	Thomas Doyle	4,550	41.2	
Total formal votes		11,054	98.5	
Informal votes		164	1.5	
Turnout		11,218	93.6	
Liberal hold		Swing		
