= Electoral results for the district of Auburn (Queensland) =

Queensland, Australia, district election results

This is a list of electoral results for the electoral district of Auburn in Queensland state elections.

== Members for Auburn ==
Member	Party	Term
Neville Hewitt	Country	1972–1974
Neville Hewitt	National	1974–1980
Neville Harper	National	1980–1992

== Election results ==
=== Elections in the 1980s ===
1989 Queensland state election: Auburn
Party	Candidate	Votes	%	±%
National	Neville Harper	6,315	47.65	−16.39
Labor	Tom Hall	4,578	34.55	−1.41
Independent	Maurice Hetherington	2,359	17.80	+17.80
Total formal votes		13,252	98.08	+0.12
Informal votes		260	1.92	−0.12
Turnout		13,512	91.54	−1.22
Two-party-preferred result
National	Neville Harper	7,902	59.63	−4.41
Labor	Tom Hall	5,350	40.37	+4.41
National hold		Swing	−4.41	

1986 Queensland state election: Auburn
Party	Candidate	Votes	%	±%
National	Neville Harper	8,252	64.0	−3.2
Labor	Tom Hall	4,634	36.0	+3.2
Total formal votes		12,886	98.0	
Informal votes		268	2.0	
Turnout		13,154	92.8	
National hold		Swing	−3.2	

1983 Queensland state election: Auburn
Party	Candidate	Votes	%	±%
National	Neville Harper	7,116	73.3	+6.0
Labor	Raymond Barker	2,590	26.7	−3.2
Total formal votes		9,706	99.2	−0.2
Informal votes		82	0.8	+0.2
Turnout		9,788	93.9	+1.9
National hold		Swing	+4.2	

1980 Queensland state election: Auburn
Party	Candidate	Votes	%	±%
National	Neville Harper	6,366	67.3	−0.5
Labor	Ray Barker	2,833	30.0	+4.2
Progress	David Trevilyan	261	2.8	−3.6
Total formal votes		9,460	99.4	+0.4
Informal votes		59	0.6	−0.4
Turnout		9,519	92.0	−0.9
Two-party-preferred result
National	Neville Harper	6,536	69.1	−3.2
Labor	Ray Barker	2,924	30.9	+3.2
National hold		Swing	−3.2	

=== Elections in the 1970s ===
1977 Queensland state election: Auburn
Party	Candidate	Votes	%	±%
National	Neville Hewitt	6,153	67.8	−10.2
Labor	Jeffrey Lenz	2,342	25.8	+3.7
Progress	David Trevilyan	576	6.4	+6.4
Total formal votes		9,071	99.0	
Informal votes		89	1.0	
Turnout		9,160	92.9	
Two-party-preferred result
National	Neville Hewitt	6,556	72.3	−5.7
Labor	Jeffrey Lenz	2,515	27.7	+5.7
National hold		Swing	−5.7	

1974 Queensland state election: Auburn
Party	Candidate	Votes	%	±%
National	Neville Hewitt	7,164	77.9	+26.6
Labor	Roden Carter	2,026	22.1	−13.0
Total formal votes		9,190	99.1	+0.2
Informal votes		83	0.9	−0.2
Turnout		9,273	91.5	−1.6
National hold		Swing	+14.5	

1972 Queensland state election: Auburn
Party	Candidate	Votes	%	±%
Country	Neville Hewitt	4,890	51.3	
Labor	Roden Carter	3,071	35.1	
Queensland Labor	Lindsay Sharpe	782	8.9	
Total formal votes		8,743	98.9	
Informal votes		95	1.1	
Turnout		8,838	93.1	
Two-party-preferred result
Country	Neville Hewitt	5,540	63.4	+0.3
Labor	Roden Carter	3,203	36.6	−0.3
Country hold		Swing	+0.3	
