= George Eaton =

George Eaton may refer to:

- George Eaton (racing driver) (born 1945), Canadian former racing driver
- George Eaton (cricketer) (1904–1938), Australian cricketer
- George Eaton (journalist) (born 1986), British journalist
- Bill Eaton (politician) (1931–2011), Australian politician
