= 1980 Queensland state election =

- 29 November 1980

All 82 seats in the Legislative Assembly of Queensland 42 Assembly seats were needed for a majority
- Turnout: 88.93 (▼2.42 pp)
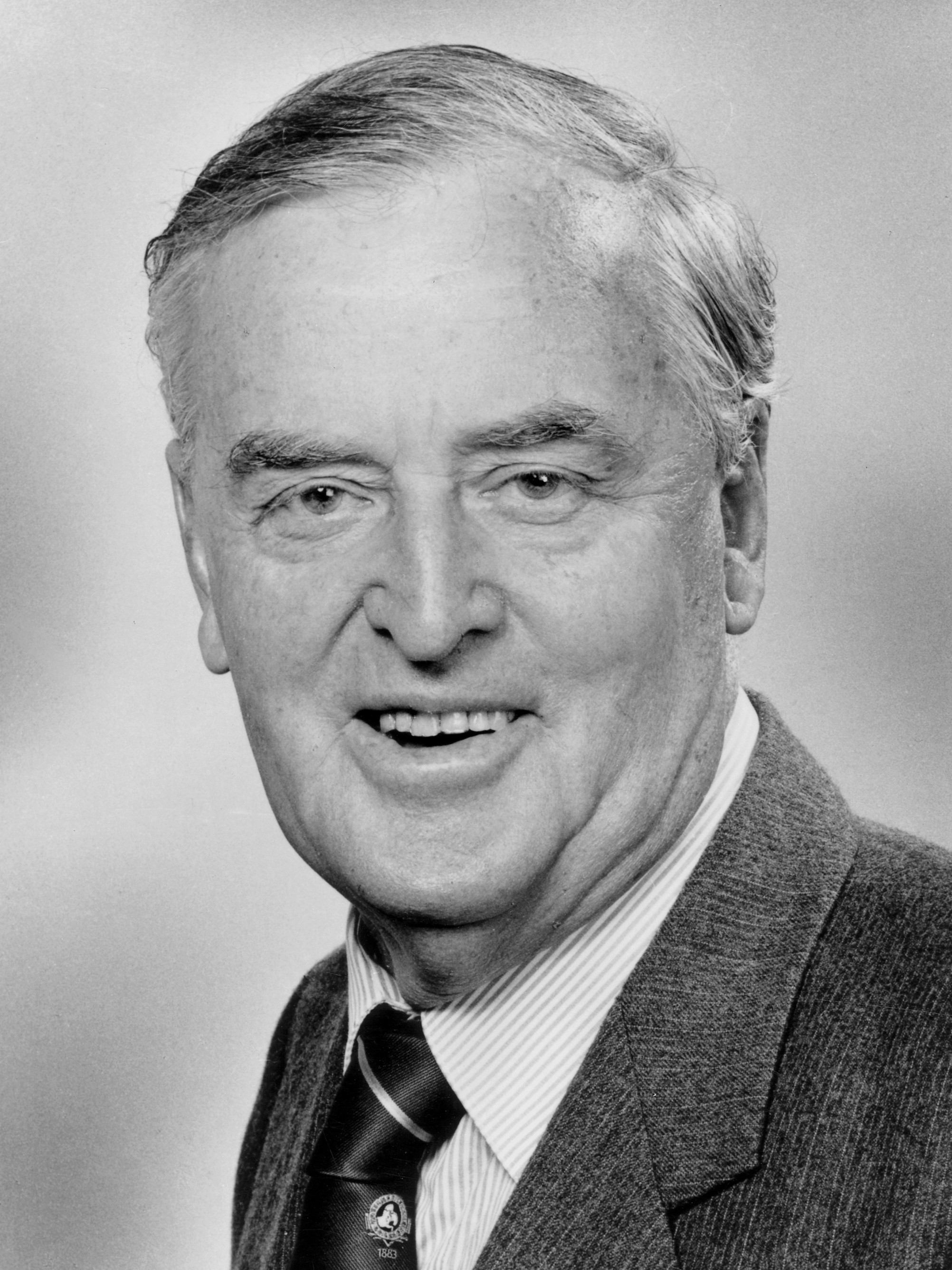

	First party	Second party
Leader	Joh Bjelke-Petersen	Ed Casey
Party	National–Liberal Coalition	Labor
Leader since	8 August 1968	28 November 1978
Leader's seat	Barambah	Mackay
Last election	59 seats, 52.37%	23 seats, 42.83%
Seats won	57	25
Seat change	▼2	▲2
Popular vote	644,534	487,493
Percentage	54.86%	41.49%
Swing	▲2.49	▼1.34
- Winning margin by electorate.
Premier before election
Joh Bjelke-Petersen
National–Liberal Coalition
Elected Premier
Joh Bjelke-Petersen
National–Liberal Coalition

Elections were held in the Australian state of Queensland on 29 November 1980 to elect the 82 members of the state's Legislative Assembly.

The election resulted in a fifth consecutive victory for the National-Liberal Coalition under Joh Bjelke-Petersen. It was the ninth victory of the National Party in Queensland since it first came to office in 1957.

== Result ==
The election saw little change from the 1977 election. The Coalition Government was returned to office, although Labor gained two seats and the Liberals lost two. The Liberal decline continued, and tensions between the Coalition parties increased.

== Key dates ==
Date	Event
27 October 1980	The Parliament was dissolved.
27 October 1980	Writs were issued by the Governor to proceed with an election.
7 November 1980	Close of nominations.
29 November 1980	Polling day, between the hours of 8am and 6pm.
23 December 1980	The Bjelke-Petersen Ministry was reconstituted.
10 January 1981	The writ was returned and the results formally declared.
3 March 1981	Parliament resumed for business.

== Results ==
Queensland state election, 29 November 1980 Legislative Assembly << 1977–1983 >>
Enrolled voters	1,341,365				
Votes cast	1,192,893		Turnout	88.93%	–2.42%
Informal votes	18,008		Informal	1.51%	–0.02%
Summary of votes by party
Party	Primary votes	%	Swing	Seats	Change
Labor	487,493	41.49%	–1.34%	25	+2
Nationals	328,262	27.94%	+0.79%	35	±0
Liberal	316,272	26.92%	+1.70%	22	–2
Democrats	16,222	1.38%	–0.23%	0	±0
Progress	4,384	0.37%	–1.13%	0	±0
Independent	20,880	1.78%	+0.09%	0	±0
Others	1,372	0.12%	+0.12%	0	±0
Total	1,174,885			82	

Popular vote
Labor	41.49%
Nationals	27.94%
Liberal	26.92%
Democrats	1.38%
Progress	0.37%
Independents	1.78%
Others	0.12%

Seats
Nationals	42.68%
Labor	30.49%
Liberal	26.83%

== Seats changing hands ==
Seat	Pre-1980			Swing	Post-1980		
Seat	Party	Member	Margin	Swing	Margin	Member	Party
Lockyer	Liberal	Tony Bourke	22.5	–28.8	6.3	Tony FitzGerald	National
Mourilyan	National	Vicky Kippin	0.3	–1.6	1.3	Bill Eaton	Labor
Southport	Liberal	Peter White	9.8	–11.9	2.1	Doug Jennings	National
Surfers Paradise	Liberal	Bruce Bishop	5.7	–13.6	7.9	Rob Borbidge	National
Townsville West	National	Max Hooper	0.9	–5.3	4.4	Geoff Smith	Labor

- In addition, the Liberal party retained Redcliffe, which was won from the National Party at the 1979 by-election.

== Post-election pendulum ==
National / Liberal seats (57)
Marginal
Ashgrove	John Greenwood	LIB	0.4%
Stafford	Terry Gygar	LIB	0.7%
Barron River	Martin Tenni	NAT	0.8%
Mount Isa	Angelo Bertoni	NAT	0.9%
Windsor	Bob Moore	LIB	1.3%
Southport	Doug Jennings	NAT	2.1% v LIB
Salisbury	Rosemary Kyburz	LIB	2.3%
Warrego	Neil Turner	NAT	2.6%
Kurilpa	Sam Doumany	LIB	2.7%
Mirani	Jim Randell	NAT	3.0%
Whitsunday	Geoff Muntz	NAT	3.5%
Redlands	John Goleby	NAT	4.2%
Merthyr	Don Lane	LIB	4.5%
Burdekin	Val Bird	NAT	4.5%
Ipswich	Llewellyn Edwards	LIB	5.1%
Redcliffe	Terry White	LIB	5.3%
Caboolture	Des Frawley	NAT	5.3%
Toowoomba North	John Lockwood	LIB	5.5%
Fairly safe
Townsville	Norman Scott-Young	LIB	6.0%
Flinders	Bob Katter	NAT	6.0%
Lockyer	Tony Fitzgerald	NAT	6.3% v LIB
Mulgrave	Max Menzel	NAT	6.5%
Wavell	Brian Austin	LIB	6.9%
Yeronga	Norm Lee	LIB	7.0%
Pine Rivers	Rob Akers	LIB	7.5%
Surfers Paradise	Rob Borbidge	NAT	7.9% v LIB
Mansfield	Bill Kaus	LIB	8.3%
Isis	Lin Powell	NAT	8.7%
Gregory	Bill Glasson	NAT	9.2%
Hinchinbrook	Ted Row	NAT	9.2%
Fassifern	Selwyn Muller	NAT	9.3%
Nundah	William Knox	LIB	9.6%
Ithaca	Col Miller	LIB	9.9%
Safe
Toowoomba South	John Warner	NAT	10.1%
Albert	Ivan Gibbs	NAT	10.9%
Carnarvon	Peter McKechnie	NAT	11.8%
Peak Downs	Vince Lester	NAT	12.1%
Greenslopes	Bill Hewitt	LIB	12.3%
Toowong	Ian Prentice	LIB	13.1%
Aspley	Beryce Nelson	LIB	13.9% v NAT
South Coast	Russ Hinze	NAT	14.6%
Somerset	Bill Gunn	NAT	15.0%
Roma	Ken Tomkins	NAT	15.4%
Mount Gravatt	Guelfi Scassola	LIB	15.7%
Callide	Lindsay Hartwig	NAT	15.8%
Cooroora	Gordon Simpson	NAT	16.4%
Warwick	Des Booth	NAT	17.7%
Gympie	Len Stephan	NAT	18.3%
Balonne	Don Neal	NAT	18.7%
Auburn	Neville Harper	NAT	19.1%
Landsborough	Mike Ahern	NAT	19.5%
Burnett	Claude Wharton	NAT	19.8%
Very safe
Sherwood	Angus Innes	LIB	20.9%
Condamine	Vic Sullivan	NAT	22.8%
Mount Coot-tha	Bill Lickiss	LIB	22.9%
Cunningham	Tony Elliott	NAT	30.3%
Barambah	Joh Bjelke-Petersen	NAT	31.8%

Labor seats (25)
Marginal
Maryborough	Brendan Hansen	ALP	0.6% v LIB
Everton	Glen Milliner	ALP	0.7% v LIB
Mourilyan	Bill Eaton	ALP	1.3%
South Brisbane	Jim Fouras	ALP	4.0% v LIB
Ipswich West	David Underwood	ALP	4.1% v LIB
Townsville West	Geoff Smith	ALP	4.4%
Bulimba	Ron McLean	ALP	4.6% v LIB
Murrumba	Joe Kruger	ALP	5.4%
Fairly safe
Woodridge	Bill D'Arcy	ALP	6.4% v LIB
Wynnum	Eric Shaw	ALP	7.3%
Port Curtis	Bill Prest	ALP	7.6%
Townsville South	Alex Wilson	ALP	7.6%
Brisbane Central	Brian Davis	ALP	7.7% v LIB
Chatsworth	Terry Mackenroth	ALP	8.2% v LIB
Bundaberg	Jim Blake	ALP	8.3%
Safe
Nudgee	Ken Vaughan	ALP	10.9% v LIB
Wolston	Bob Gibbs	ALP	11.2% v LIB
Mackay	Ed Casey	ALP	11.6%
Rockhampton North	Les Yewdale	ALP	12.2%
Cook	Bob Scott	ALP	12.4%
Cairns	Ray Jones	ALP	13.9%
Sandgate	Nev Warburton	ALP	14.6% v LIB
Rockhampton	Keith Wright	ALP	17.3%
Very safe
Archerfield	Kevin Hooper	ALP	21.1%
Lytton	Tom Burns	ALP	23.6% v LIB

== See also ==
- Candidates of the Queensland state election, 1980
