= 1977 Queensland state election =

- 12 November 1977

All 82 seats in the Legislative Assembly of Queensland 42 Assembly seats were needed for a majority
- Turnout: 91.35 (▲1.93 pp)
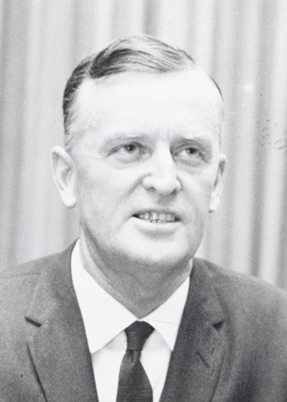

	First party	Second party
Leader	Joh Bjelke-Petersen	Tom Burns
Party	National–Liberal Coalition	Labor
Leader since	8 August 1968	19 December 1974
Leader's seat	Barambah	Lytton
Last election	69 seats, 58.97%	11 seats, 36.03%
Seats won	59	23
Seat change	▼10	▲12
Popular vote	569,753	466,021
Percentage	52.37%	42.83%
Swing	▼5.14	▲6.80
- Winning margin by electorate.
Premier before election
Joh Bjelke-Petersen
National–Liberal Coalition
Elected Premier
Joh Bjelke-Petersen
National–Liberal Coalition

Elections were held in the Australian state of Queensland on 12 November 1977 to elect the 82 members of the state's Legislative Assembly.

The election resulted in a fourth consecutive victory for the National–Liberal Coalition under Joh Bjelke-Petersen. It was the eighth victory of the National Party in Queensland since it first came to office in 1957.

== Issues ==
The major issue in the election was law and order. In 1977, the Government had passed a law making it illegal to march in the street without a permit, which were rarely given. The Coalition argued that this prevented traffic disruption and other inconveniences to the people of Brisbane, while the ALP claimed that it was a curtailment of civil liberties. Joh Bjelke-Petersen also no longer had the Whitlam Labor Government (which was unpopular in Queensland) to use as a campaigning tool.

== Key dates ==
Date	Event
10 October 1977	The Legislative Assembly was dissolved.
10 October 1977	Writs were issued by the Governor, James Ramsay, to proceed with an election.
17 October 1977	Close of nominations.
12 November 1977	Polling day, between the hours of 8am and 6pm.
16 December 1977	The Bjelke-Petersen Ministry was reconstituted.
20 December 1977	The writ was returned and the results formally declared.
14 January 1978	Deadline for return of the writs.
28 March 1978	Parliament resumed for business.

== Result ==
The Labor Party gained twelve seats from the Coalition and Independents, making something of a recovery from its disastrous 1974 performance. Even so, the Coalition retained a commanding majority in the Legislative Assembly.

For the first time, the National Party won more votes than the Liberal party (an electoral malapportionment had allowed the Nationals to win more seats than the Liberals previously). The Liberal Party had begun to decline.

The Democratic Labor Party had ceased to exist. The Australian Democrats contested their first election in Queensland.

== Results ==
Queensland state election, 12 November 1977 Legislative Assembly << 1974–1980 >>
Enrolled voters	1,209,494				
Votes cast	1,104,898		Turnout	91.35%	+1.93%
Informal votes	16,887		Informal	1.53%	–0.05%
Summary of votes by party
Party	Primary votes	%	Swing	Seats	Change
Labor	466,021	42.83%	+6.80%	23	+12
Nationals	295,355	27.15%	–0.73%	35	–4
Liberal	274,398	25.22%	–5.87%	24	–6
Democrats	17,571	1.61%	+1.61%	0	±0
Progress	16,327	1.50%	+1.50%	0	±0
Independent	18,339	1.69%	–1.22%	0	–2
Total	1,088,011			82	

Popular vote
Labor	42.83%
Nationals	27.15%
Liberal	25.22%
Democrats	1.61%
Progress	1.50%
Independents	1.69%

Seats
Nationals	42.68%
Liberal	29.27%
Labor	28.05%

New parties in this election were the Australian Democrats, who stood 12 candidates, and the Progress Party, who stood 27 candidates.

== Seats changing hands ==
Seat	Pre-1977			Swing	Post-1977		
Seat	Party	Member	Margin	Swing	Margin	Member	Party
Brisbane Central	Liberal	notional – new seat	2.8	–8.2	5.4	Brian Davis	Labor
Chatsworth	Liberal	Bill Hewitt	5.7	–6.8	1.1	Terry Mackenroth	Labor
Cook	National	Eric Deeral	2.6	–6.5	3.9	Bob Scott	Labor
Everton	Liberal	Brian Lindsay	9.2	–10.2	1.0	Glen Milliner	Labor
Ipswich West	National	Albert Hales	1.1	–5.4	4.3	David Underwood	Labor
Maryborough	Liberal	Gilbert Alison	5.0	–5.2	0.2	Brendan Hansen	Labor
Murrumba	National	Des Frawley	9.7	–11.1	1.4	Joe Kruger	Labor
South Brisbane	Liberal	Colin Lamont	4.1	–7.3	3.2	Jim Fouras	Labor
Southport	National	notional – new seat	19.4	–29.2	9.8	Peter White	Liberal
Surfers Paradise	National	Bruce Small	23.0	–28.7	5.7	Bruce Bishop	Liberal
Townsville South	Independent	Tom Aikens	0.6	–1.6	1.0	Alex Wilson	Labor
Woodridge	Liberal	notional – new seat	7.8	–11.9	4.1	Bill D'Arcy	Labor
Wynnum	National	Bill Lamond	0.1	–4.2	4.1	Eric Shaw	Labor

- Members listed in italics did not recontest their seats.
- In addition, the Independent member for Mackay, Ed Casey re-joined the Labor party before the election and retained the seat.

== Post-election pendulum ==
National / Liberal seats (59)
Marginal
Barron River	Martin Tenni	NAT	0.2%
Mourilyan	Vicky Kippin	NAT	0.3%
Stafford	Terry Gygar	LIB	0.5%
Mount Isa	Angelo Bertoni	NAT	0.6%
Salisbury	Rosemary Kyburz	LIB	0.7%
Townsville West	Max Hooper	NAT	0.9%
Toowoomba North	John Lockwood	LIB	1.6%
Wavell	Brian Austin	LIB	2.8%
Kurilpa	Sam Doumany	LIB	3.0%
Warrego	Neil Turner	NAT	3.0%
Hinchinbrook	Ted Row	NAT	3.1%
Pine Rivers	Rob Akers	LIB	3.4%
Ipswich	Llewellyn Edwards	LIB	4.1%
Windsor	Bob Moore	LIB	4.5%
Ashgrove	John Greenwood	LIB	4.9%
Toowoomba South	John Warner	NAT	4.9%
Albert	Ivan Gibbs	NAT	5.0%
Redlands	John Goleby	NAT	5.4%
Whitsunday	Ron Camm	NAT	5.5%
Surfers Paradise	Bruce Bishop	LIB	5.7%
Fairly safe
Ithaca	Col Miller	LIB	6.0%
Redcliffe	Jim Houghton	NAT	6.2%
Townsville	Norman Scott-Young	LIB	6.3%
Merthyr	Don Lane	LIB	6.4%
Gregory	Bill Glasson	NAT	6.8%
Flinders	Bob Katter	NAT	7.1%
Peak Downs	Vince Lester	NAT	7.8%
Nundah	William Knox	LIB	8.1%
Yeronga	Norm Lee	LIB	8.1%
Mulgrave	Roy Armstrong	NAT	8.4%
Toowong	Charles Porter	LIB	8.7%
Caboolture	Des Frawley	NAT	9.0%
Isis	Lin Powell	NAT	9.2%
South Coast	Russ Hinze	NAT	9.3%
Southport	Peter White	LIB	9.8% v NAT
Safe
Burdekin	Val Bird	NAT	10.3%
Mount Gravatt	Guelfi Scassola	LIB	10.4%
Fassifern	Selwyn Muller	NAT	11.4%
Aspley	Fred Campbell	LIB	11.5% v NAT
Mirani	Tom Newbery	NAT	11.5%
Greenslopes	Bill Hewitt	LIB	12.4%
Mansfield	Bill Kaus	LIB	12.6%
Sherwood	Angus Innes	LIB	12.9%
Carnarvon	Peter McKechnie	NAT	13.5%
Callide	Lindsay Hartwig	NAT	15.3%
Roma	Ken Tomkins	NAT	16.0%
Somerset	Bill Gunn	NAT	17.9%
Cooroora	Gordon Simpson	NAT	18.1%
Landsborough	Mike Ahern	NAT	18.2%
Gympie	Max Hodges	NAT	18.8%
Warwick	Des Booth	NAT	18.9%
Burnett	Claude Wharton	NAT	19.3%
Mount Coot-tha	Bill Lickiss	LIB	19.8%
Very safe
Condamine	Vic Sullivan	NAT	21.4%
Balonne	Don Neal	NAT	21.9%
Auburn	Neville Hewitt	NAT	22.3%
Lockyer	Tony Bourke	LIB	22.5%
Barambah	Joh Bjelke-Petersen	NAT	28.3%
Cunningham	Tony Elliott	NAT	30.6%

Labor seats (23)
Marginal
Maryborough	Brendan Hansen	ALP	0.2% v LIB
Everton	Glen Milliner	ALP	1.0% v LIB
Townsville South	Alex Wilson	ALP	1.0% v IND
Chatsworth	Terry Mackenroth	ALP	1.1% v LIB
Murrumba	Joe Kruger	ALP	1.4%
South Brisbane	Jim Fouras	ALP	3.2% v LIB
Cook	Bob Scott	ALP	3.9%
Woodridge	Bill D'Arcy	ALP	4.1% v LIB
Wynnum	Eric Shaw	ALP	4.1%
Ipswich West	David Underwood	ALP	4.3%
Bundaberg	Jim Blake	ALP	4.4%
Brisbane Central	Brian Davis	ALP	5.4% v LIB
Fairly safe
Sandgate	Nev Warburton	ALP	8.0%
Nudgee	Ken Vaughan	ALP	8.7% v LIB
Bulimba	Jack Houston	ALP	9.8% v LIB
Safe
Wolston	Bob Gibbs	ALP	10.6% v LIB
Cairns	Ray Jones	ALP	11.4%
Port Curtis	Bill Prest	ALP	11.8%
Mackay	Ed Casey	ALP	11.9%
Rockhampton North	Les Yewdale	ALP	16.2% v LIB
Lytton	Tom Burns	ALP	17.0%
Rockhampton	Keith Wright	ALP	17.3% v LIB
Archerfield	Kevin Hooper	ALP	18.4% v LIB

== See also ==
- Candidates of the Queensland state election, 1977
- Members of the Queensland Legislative Assembly, 1974–1977
- Members of the Queensland Legislative Assembly, 1977–1980
