= George Eaton (cricketer) =

Australian cricketer

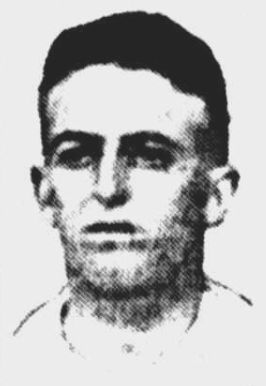

Personal information
- Full name: George Melville Eaton
- Born: 23 October 1904; Durban, South Africa
- Died: 28 May 1938 (aged 33); Melbourne, Australia
- Batting: Right-handed

Domestic team information
- Years: Team
- 1931: Victoria

Career statistics
Competition	First-class
Matches	4
Runs scored	295
Batting average	42.14
100s/50s	1/0
Top score	184
Balls bowled	0
Wickets	–
Bowling average	–
5 wickets in innings	–
10 wickets in match	–
Best bowling	–
Catches/stumpings	1/0
- Source: Cricinfo, 27 March 2018

George Eaton (23 October 1904 – 28 May 1938) was an Australian cricketer. He played four first-class cricket matches for Victoria in 1931. His highest first-class score was 184 against Tasmania.

== See also ==
- List of Victoria first-class cricketers
