= Winston Noble =

Australian politician

The Honourable Winston Noble

Minister for Health and Home Affairs
- In office 12 August 1957 – 26 September 1963
- Preceded by: Bill Moore

Minister for Health
- In office 26 September 1963 – 28 March 1964
- Succeeded by: Douglas Tooth

Member of the Queensland Legislative Assembly for Yeronga
- In office 29 April 1950 – 28 March 1964
- Preceded by: New seat
- Succeeded by: Norm Lee

Personal details
- Born: Henry Winston Noble; 5 July 1909 Brisbane, Queensland, Australia
- Died: 28 March 1964 (aged 52) Mooloolaba, Queensland, Australia
- Resting place: Mount Gravatt
- Party: Liberal Party
- Spouse: Myra Edith Godwin (m. 1936)
- Children: John, Robert, James, Prudence and Susan
- Education: University of Queensland, University of Sydney
- Profession: Medical practitioner

Henry Winston Noble (5 July 1909 – 28 March 1964) was a member of the Queensland Legislative Assembly.

== Biography ==
Noble was born at Brisbane, Queensland, the son of the Alexander Noble and his wife Alice Ann (née Wood). He was educated at Brisbane Grammar School and went on to the University of Queensland and the University of Sydney where he earned his MBBS. He became a resident medical officer in Sydney before heading back to Brisbane and working as a medical practitioner in Brisbane. In 1942 he joined the Australian Army and served in the 7th Field Ambulance, being discharged a year later with the rank of captain.

On 27 June 1936, Noble married Myra Edith Godwin and together had three sons and two daughters. He died of a heart attack at his holiday house at Mooloolaba in March 1964. He was accorded a state funeral and cremated at the Mt Thompson Crematorium.

== Public life ==
After losing to future Queensland Premier, Vince Gair for the seat of South Brisbane at the 1947 Queensland state election, Noble, for the Liberal Party, won the new seat of Yeronga at the 1950 Queensland state election and held the seat until his death in 1964. From 1957 until his death he was the Minister for Health and Home Affairs.

Political offices
Preceded by Bill Moore as Secretary for Health and Home Affairs	Minister for Health and Home Affairs; 1957–1963	Succeeded by Himself as Minister for Health
Preceded by Himself as Minister for Health and Home Affairs	Minister for Health; 1963–1964	Succeeded by Douglas Tooth
Parliament of Queensland
New seat	Member for Yeronga; 1950–1964	Succeeded by Norm Lee
