= Peter Byrne (politician) =

Australian politician

Member of the Queensland Legislative Assembly for Mourilyan
- In office 29 Apr 1950 – 17 May 1969
- Preceded by: New seat
- Succeeded by: Peter Moore

Personal details
- Born: Peter Byrne; 13 June 1892 Myola, Queensland, Australia
- Died: 16 March 1974 (aged 81) Brisbane, Queensland, Australia
- Resting place: Pinnaroo Lawn Cemetery
- Party: Labor
- Spouse(s): Ellen Elsiba Imison (m.1923 d.1926), Amy Jean Scott (m.1929 d.1967)
- Occupation: Canegrower

Peter Byrne (13 June 1892 – 16 March 1974) was a member of the Queensland Legislative Assembly.

== Early life ==
Byrne was born at Myola, Queensland, the son of Peter Byrne Snr and his wife Mary (née McCoy). He was educated at the Mareeba State School and then attended Nudgee College in Brisbane. On leaving school he found work at the Chillagoe smelters before becoming a canegrower in Tully from 1925. He was also a tax agent and, during the 1930s, helped many farmers who had been declared bankrupt get back on their feet again.

On 7 May 1923 Byrne married Ellen Elsiba Imison but Ellen died just three years later, the marriage bring two sons. Six years after his first marriage Byrne married for a second time, to Amy Jean Scott on 4 November 1929 (died 1967) and together they had three daughters. Byrne died in March 1974 and was buried in the Pinnaroo Lawn Cemetery.

== Public life ==
At the 1950 Queensland state election Byrne, for the Labor Party, won the new seat of Mourilyan. He was the member for Mourilyan until the 1969 Queensland state election when he retired from politics.

Parliament of Queensland
| New seat | Member for Mourilyan; 1950–1969 | Succeeded by Peter Moore |
