= Peter Moore (Queensland politician) =

Australian politician

Member of the Queensland Legislative Assembly for Mourilyan
- In office 17 May 1969 – 7 December 1974
- Preceded by: Peter Byrne
- Succeeded by: Vicky Kippin

Personal details
- Born: Francis Peter Moore; 9 March 1938 (age 88) Mareeba, Queensland, Australia
- Party: Labor
- Spouse: Elaine Maureen Martin (m.1960)
- Education: University of Queensland
- Occupation: School teacher

Francis Peter Moore (born 9 March 1938) was a member of the Queensland Legislative Assembly.

== Early life ==
Moore was born at Mareeba, Queensland, the son of Charles Moore and his wife Mary Amelia (née McDowall). He was educated at the St Thomas's Convent, Mareeba, St Theresa's Agricultural College, Abergowrie, and St Augustine's College, Cairns before attending the University of Queensland. He became a school teacher and taught at Mareeba State School in 1957 before coming a science master, teaching at Queensland state secondary schools. In 1957 he was a National Service trainee in the Australian Army.

On 2 January 1960 Moore married Elaine Maureen Martin with the marriage producing a son and a daughter.

== Public life ==
At the 1969 Queensland state election Moore, for the Labor Party, won the seat of Mourilyan. He went on to be the member until the 1974 Queensland state election when he was defeated by the National Party's Vicky Kippin.

Parliament of Queensland
Preceded by Peter Byrne	Member for Mourilyan; 1969–1974	Succeeded by Vicky Kippin
