= Neville Harper =

Australian politician (1926–2023)

The Hon Nev Harper

Member of the Queensland Legislative Assembly for Auburn
- In office 29 November 1980 – 19 September 1992
- Preceded by: Neville Hewitt
- Succeeded by: Seat abolished

Personal details
- Born: Neville John Harper; 10 September 1926 Brisbane, Queensland, Australia
- Died: 29 September 2023 (aged 97) Alexandra Headland, Queensland, Australia
- Party: National Party
- Spouse: Marjorie Pointon
- Occupation: Grazier

Neville John Harper (10 September 1926 – 29 September 2023) was an Australian politician.

== Life and career ==
Neville John Harper was born in Brisbane on 10 September 1926, to Neville Barclay Harper and Hazel Jane, née Gardner. He attended New Farm and Nundah State Schools and then Brisbane Grammar School (1940–44) before becoming a grazier, farmer and real estate valuer. On 12 November 1949, he married Marjorie Pointon, with whom he had two daughters. From 1945 to 1947 he served in the Royal Australian Navy as a sub-lieutenant aboard HMAS Hawkesbury before returning to manage cattle properties in Barmundu and Kingaroy. In 1952 he was appointed manager of Mactaggarts station in Cunnamulla.

Harper was a member of the National Party, and served as chairman of the Wandoan branch. He served as chairman of the electorate councils for the state seats of Roma (1969–72) and Auburn (1972–80) and president of the council for the federal seat of Maranoa (1972–77), for which he also directed the 1974 and 1975 campaigns. In 1976 he was elected to Taroom Shire Council, and he was also elected vice-president of the Queensland National Party in that year. Other party positions he held included chairman of the Defence and Foreign Affairs Policy Committee (1977–81), Membership Coordinator for Queensland (1978–80), member of the State Finance Committee (1979–80), and chairman of the Rural Policy Committee (1981). In 1980 he was elected to the Queensland Legislative Assembly as the member for Auburn. Promoted to the front bench as Attorney-General and Minister for Justice in 1983, moving to Primary Industries in 1986 and to Land Management in 1989. He was mentioned as a possible successor for Joh Bjelke-Petersen during this period. Following the Nationals' defeat in 1989 he became Shadow Attorney-General, but his seat of Auburn was abolished in 1992 and he was defeated for preselection in Callide by sitting member Di McCauley, choosing subsequently to retire.

Neville Harper died in Alexandra Headland, Queensland on 29 September 2023, at the age of 97.

Political offices
Preceded by Brian Austin	Leader of the House of the Legislative Assembly of Queensland; 1989	Succeeded by Terry Mackenroth
Parliament of Queensland
Preceded by Neville Hewitt	Member for Auburn; 1980–1992	Abolished
