= Tony Bourke (politician) =

Australian politician (born 1941)

Member of the Queensland Legislative Assembly for Lockyer
- In office 16 October 1976 – 29 November 1980
- Preceded by: Gordon Chalk
- Succeeded by: Tony FitzGerald

63rd Mayor of Toowoomba
- In office 1997–2000
- Preceded by: Ross Miller
- Succeeded by: Di Thorley

Personal details
- Born: Anthony James Bourke; 30 July 1941 (age 85) Nundah, Queensland, Australia
- Spouse: Mary Agnes McNamara (m.1970)
- Education: University of Queensland
- Occupation: Pharmacist

Anthony James Bourke (born 30 July 1941) is an Australian politician. He was a Liberal Party member of the Queensland Legislative Assembly from 1976 to 1980, representing the electorate of Lockyer. A long-term Toowoomba councillor, he later served as Mayor of Toowoomba from 1997 to 2000.

Bourke was born in the Brisbane suburb of Nundah, and was educated at St Patrick's College in Shorncliffe and the University of Queensland. A pharmacist outside politics, he worked in Brisbane from 1959 to 1966 and in London from 1966 to 1969, before settling in Toowoomba in 1970. He bought and operated a pharmacy in Margaret Street, and was elected as a City of Toowoomba alderman in 1976.

== State politics ==
In 1976, Gordon Chalk, the state Liberal leader since 1965, retired from politics mid-term, causing a by-election in his seat of Lockyer. Bourke was selected as the Liberal candidate to succeed him, but faced a strong challenge from National Party candidate Neville Adermann, son of former federal minister Charles Adermann. The National Party, though in coalition with the Liberal Party, had long held claim to Lockyer, but were reluctant to oppose Chalk; on his retirement, they had nominated a candidate. The campaign was bitter and saw the National Party target the seat with significant resources, but Bourke won 40% of the primary vote and won the seat on preferences.

Bourke was re-elected at the 1977 state election, and served as secretary to the joint government parties from April 1979 until November 1980. Tensions between the two parties had grown towards the end of that term, and at the 1980 election, he faced another strong challenge from the National Party; he would go on to lose to their candidate, farmer Tony FitzGerald.

Bourke had sold his pharmacy business upon his election to parliament, and worked as a real estate agent for Rogers and Joseph after his election defeat. He opened his own pharmacy again in 1984 in Bridge Street. He had remained an alderman through his time in state politics, and subsequently served as deputy mayor under Clive Berghofer for six years, leaving the council in 1988.

== Mayor of Toowoomba ==
Bourke returned to local politics in 1997, when he was elected Mayor of Toowoomba, having received a high-profile late endorsement from Berghofer. He pursued a policy of fiscal restraint as mayor, and touted among his successes as mayor the completion of an aquatic centre, water treatment plant, and securing a deal to sell sewerage effluent to the Millmerran Power Station. He had an acrimonious relationship with the local media, and had received criticism for a perception of an 'abrasive' attitude towards ratepayers and council staff. He was reportedly the subject of a Criminal Justice Commission inquiry into complaints of verbal harassment of council staff in 1999, but maintained there had never been a complaint lodged against him. He also had a highly publicised falling out with the city's chief executive officer, who subsequently resigned after an extended period on stress leave. He ran for re-election in 2001, but was defeated by alderman Di Thorley. He considered running as an independent for the federal seat of Groom at the 2001 election, but this did not eventuate.

He sold his pharmacy business in 2002, and thereafter worked as a locum pharmacist in the Toowoomba area. He later contested the 2008 council elections for the new Toowoomba Regional Council, but was unsuccessful.

Parliament of Queensland
Preceded by Gordon Chalk	Member for Lockyer; 1976–1980	Succeeded by Tony FitzGerald
Civic offices
Preceded by Ross Miller	Mayor of Toowoomba; 1997–2000	Succeeded by Di Thorley
