= Vicky Kippin =

Australian politician (1942–2019)

Member of the Queensland Legislative Assembly for Mourilyan
- In office 7 December 1974 – 29 November 1980
- Preceded by: Peter Moore
- Succeeded by: Bill Eaton

Personal details
- Born: Victoria Anne Cox; 7 September 1942 Ayr, Queensland, Australia
- Died: 24 March 2019 (aged 76) East Palmerston, Queensland, Australia
- Party: National Party
- Spouse(s): Norman Edwin James Kippin (divorced), Shane O'Connor
- Education: James Cook University, University of Queensland
- Occupation: School teacher, Cattle station manager

Victoria Anne Kippin (7 September 1942 – 24 March 2019) was an Australian politician. She was a National Party member of the Legislative Assembly of Queensland from 1974 to 1980, representing the district of Mourilyan.

== Early life ==
Kippin was born in the north Queensland town of Ayr. Her parents were Vivian Henry Cox and Enid Parry Trower, who own a grazing property in the Burdekin district where she was raised. She attended Kalamia and Ayr state schools, St Anne's Church of England Grammar School in Townsville and Ayr High School. A foundation student at the University College of Townsville in 1961, she took on pharmacy before transferring to agricultural science in 1962, studying the subject for three years.

In 1965, Kippin became a teacher at Fairholme College in Toowoomba. In 1966, she married Norman Edwin James Kippin. The couple had a son and a daughter but would later divorce. From 1964 to 1974, Kippin managed cattle properties and a transport business in north Queensland.

== Politics ==
Kippin was also active in the Country Party, later known as the National Party. She was the party president of the Coast Zone Women's Section and the Zone vice president of the Far Northern Women's Section.

Kippin won election to state parliament at the 1974 state election, a landslide victory for the National-Liberal coalition. Elected as the National Party member for Mourilyan, it was the first time a non-Labor candidate had won the seat. Kippin was re-elected for a second term at the 1977 state election, before her defeat at the 1980 state election to Labor candidate Bill Eaton. She stood again as the National Party candidate for Mourilyan at the 1983 state election but failed to win back her old seat.

During her time in parliament, Kippin advocated the upgrade of major highways and was recognised for her efforts by the naming of the Vicky Kippin Bridge on the Palmerston Highway. She was believed to be favoured by Premier Joh Bjelke-Petersen to become Queensland's first female minister, but this did not eventuate due to her defeat at the 1980 state election.

Turning her attention to local government, Kippin served as a Johnstone Shire councillor from 1982 to 1985.

She also stood as the National Party candidate for the Townsville-based seat of Herbert at the 1984 federal election; not a natural National seat, she lost to incumbent Labor MP Ted Lindsay.

== Later life ==
Following her departure from state politics, Kippin won the Commercial Fisherman of the Year Award in 1981 and was elected chairman of the Innisfail Regional Promotion Bureau the same year. In 1984, she became the Queensland Administrator of the Northern Australia Development Council.

Kippin later married Shane O'Connor and returned to the family farm. She became the inaugural president of the Zonta Club of Innisfail.

Kippin-O'Connor died on 24 March 2019, aged 76.

Parliament of Queensland
Preceded by Peter Moore	Member for Mourilyan; 1974–1980	Succeeded by Bill Eaton
