= Selwyn Muller =

Australian dairy farmer and politician

The Honourable Selwyn Muller

Speaker of the Queensland Legislative Assembly
- In office 8 August 1979 – 17 October 1983
- Preceded by: Jim Houghton
- Succeeded by: John Warner
- Constituency: Fassifern

Member of the Queensland Legislative Assembly for Fassifern
- In office 17 May 1969 – 22 October 1983
- Preceded by: Alf Muller
- Succeeded by: Kev Lingard

Personal details
- Born: Selwyn John Muller; 18 October 1917 Boonah, Queensland, Australia
- Died: 24 February 2008 (aged 90) Boonah, Queensland, Australia
- Resting place: Kalbar General Cemetery
- Party: Country Party/National Party
- Spouse: Patricia Margaret O'Callaghan (m.1950 d.1988)
- Relations: Alf Muller (father)
- Occupation: Dairy farmer

Selwyn John "Sel" Muller (18 October 1917 – 24 February 2008) was a dairy farmer and member of the Queensland Legislative Assembly.

== Biography ==
Muller was born in Boonah, Queensland, to parents Adolf Gustav Muller and his wife Annie (née Lobegeiger) and attended Kalbar State School and Boonah High School. He became a farmer and grazier in the Boonah district. In World War Two he was assigned to the 7 Division Cavalry Regiment reaching the rank of Lieutenant.

On 14 August 1950 Muller married Patricia Margaret O'Callaghan (died 1988) and together had one son and one daughter. He died in February 2008 and was buried in Kalbar General Cemetery.

== Political career ==
Muller represented the state seat of Fassifern from 1969 until 1983, taking over the seat from his father, Alf Muller. He was the Speaker from 1979 until 1983.

== See also ==
Political families of Australia

Parliament of Queensland
Preceded by Jim Houghton	Speaker of the Legislative Assembly; 1979–1983	Succeeded by John Warner
Preceded by Alf Muller	Member for Fassifern; 1969–1983	Succeeded by Kev Lingard
