= Bill Eaton (politician) =

Australian politician

Member of the Queensland Legislative Assembly for Mourilyan
- In office 29 November 1980 – 19 September 1992
- Preceded by: Vicky Kippin
- Succeeded by: Seat abolished

Personal details
- Born: Andrew George Eaton; 29 November 1931 Gilgandra, New South Wales, Australia
- Died: 22 May 2011 (aged 79) Cairns, Queensland, Australia
- Party: Labor
- Spouse: Shirley Daw Boothman
- Occupation: Linesman

Andrew George "Bill" Eaton (29 November 1931 – 22 May 2011) was an Australian politician. He was a Member of the Queensland Legislative Assembly.

== Early life ==
Eaton was born in Gilgandra in New South Wales to Cyril Allan Dudley Eaton and Mary Catherine, née O'Donohue. He attended Dobies Bight State School and St Mary's Convent in Casino. In 1931 he married Shirley Daw Boothman; they had four children, but Shirley died of leukaemia shortly after their fourth child's birth. Eaton worked as a labourer, fencer, timber cutter, stationhand and machinery operator, and from 1963 he was the leading hand of a live-line gang with the Far North Queensland Electricity Board.

== Politics ==
In 1980, Eaton was elected to the Queensland Legislative Assembly as the Labor member for Mourilyan. In 1983 he was promoted to the front bench as Opposition Spokesman for Water Resources and Maritime Services, and upon Labor's victory in 1989 he became Minister for Land Management. His seat was abolished in 1992 and largely merged with the neighbouring National-held seat of Hinchinbrook. The merged seat was notionally Labor-held, but Eaton lost a close contest to National's Marc Rowell.

== Later life ==
Eaton died on 22 May 2011 in Cairns.

Parliament of Queensland
Preceded by Vicky Kippin	Member for Mourilyan; 1980–1992	Abolished
