= Electoral district of Auburn (Queensland) =

Former state electoral district of Queensland, Australia

Auburn Queensland—Legislative Assembly
- State: Queensland
- Dates current: 1972–1992
- Namesake: Auburn River

Auburn was an electoral district of the Legislative Assembly in the Australian state of Queensland from 1972 to 1992.

First created for the 1972 state election, it largely replaced the abolished district of Mackenzie. Based in the west Burnett region, it was always a National Party seat.

Auburn was abolished ahead of 1992 state election, largely absorbed into the pre-existing district of Callide, with parts also going to the new district of Fitzroy.

== Members for Auburn ==
Member	Party	Term
Neville Hewitt	Country	1972–1974
Neville Hewitt	National	1974–1980
Neville Harper	National	1980–1992

== See also ==
- Electoral districts of Queensland
- Members of the Queensland Legislative Assembly by year
- Category:Members of the Queensland Legislative Assembly by name
