= Norm Lee =

Australian politician

The Honourable Norm Lee

Member of the Queensland Legislative Assembly for Yeronga
- In office 4 June 1964 – 2 December 1989
- Preceded by: Winston Noble
- Succeeded by: Matt Foley

Personal details
- Born: Norman Edward Lee; 4 April 1920 Brisbane, Queensland, Australia
- Died: 3 April 2002 (aged 81) Brisbane, Queensland, Australia
- Party: Liberal Party
- Spouse: Dorothy May Parr
- Occupation: Grazier, Civil engineer

Norman Edward Lee (4 April 1920 – 3 April 2002) was an Australian politician. He was a Member of the Queensland Legislative Assembly.

== Early life ==
Lee was born in Brisbane to James Henry Lee and Helena Hilda, née Lindner. He attended state school at Yeronga and became a grazier and civil engineering contractor.

== Politics ==
In 1964 Lee was elected to the Queensland Legislative Assembly as the Liberal member for Yeronga in a by-election following the death of former Health Minister Winston Noble. In 1975 he was promoted to the front bench as Minister for Works and Housing, moving to Industry and Administrative Services in 1977. He was dismissed from the front bench in 1980. In 1983 he was involved in negotiations to defect to the National Party, but this did not eventuate. Lee retired from politics in 1989.

== Later life ==
Lee died in Brisbane on 3 April 2002.

Parliament of Queensland
| Preceded by Winston Noble | Member for Yeronga; 1964–1989 | Succeeded by Matt Foley |
