= Electoral district of Mourilyan =

Former state electoral district of Queensland, Australia

Mourilyan Queensland—Legislative Assembly
- State: Queensland
- Dates current: 1950–1992
- Namesake: Mourilyan

Mourilyan was an electoral district of the Legislative Assembly in the Australian state of Queensland from 1950 to 1992.

First created for the 1950 state election, the district was based in north Queensland, centred on the town of Mourilyan, taking in areas previously belonging to the abolished district of Herbert.

Mourilyan was abolished by the 1991 redistribution, necessitated by the one vote one value reforms, taking effect at the 1992 state election. Its territory was divided between the neighbouring districts of Hinchinbrook and Tablelands.

== Members for Mourilyan ==
Member	Party	Term
Peter Byrne	Labor	1950–1969
Peter Moore	Labor	1969–1974
Vicky Kippin	National	1974–1980
Bill Eaton	Labor	1980–1992

== See also ==
- Electoral districts of Queensland
- Members of the Queensland Legislative Assembly by year
- Category:Members of the Queensland Legislative Assembly by name
