= Electoral results for the district of Bundaberg =

Queensland, Australia, district election results

This is a list of electoral results for the electoral district of Bundaberg in Queensland state elections.

== Members for Bundaberg ==
Member	Party	Term
Walter Adams	Conservative	1888–1890
Walter Adams	Ministerial	1890–1892
George Hall	Labour	1892–1893
Michael Duffy	Ministerial	1893–1896
Thomas Glassey	Labour	1896–1901
George Barber	Labor	1901–1935
Bernard McLean	Labor	1935–1941
Frank Barnes	Independent Labor	1941–1947
Frank Barnes	Frank Barnes Labor	1947–1950
Ted Walsh	Labor	1950–1957
Ted Walsh	Queensland Labor	1957–1963
Ted Walsh	Independent	1963–1969
Lou Jensen	Labor	1969–1976
Lou Jensen	Independent	1976–1977
Jim Blake	Labor	1977–1983
Clem Campbell	Labor	1983–1998
Nita Cunningham	Labor	1998–2006
Jack Dempsey	National	2006–2008
Jack Dempsey	Liberal National	2008–2015
Leanne Donaldson	Labor	2015–2017
David Batt	Liberal National	2017–2020
Tom Smith	Labor	2020–present

== Election results ==
=== Elections in the 2020s ===
2024 Queensland state election: Bundaberg
Party	Candidate	Votes	%	±%
Labor	Tom Smith	13,253	41.47	−1.73
Liberal National	Bree Watson	12,262	38.37	−3.17
One Nation	Alberto Carvalho	2,451	7.67	+1.87
Legalise Cannabis	Ian Zunker	1,857	5.81	+0.31
Greens	Nat Baker	1,089	3.41	+0.21
Independent	Geoff Warham	603	1.89	+1.89
Independent	Alan Corbett	442	1.38	+1.38
Total formal votes		31,957	95.02	−1.46
Informal votes		1,676	4.98	+1.46
Turnout		33,633	88.57	−0.33
Two-party-preferred result
Labor	Tom Smith	16,460	51.51	+1.51
Liberal National	Bree Watson	15,497	48.49	−1.51
Labor hold		Swing	+1.51	

2020 Queensland state election: Bundaberg
Party	Candidate	Votes	%	±%
Labor	Tom Smith	13,053	43.12	+8.76
Liberal National	David Batt	12,577	41.55	+6.03
One Nation	Stewart Jones	1,766	5.83	−16.60
Legalise Cannabis	Ian Zunker	1,669	5.51	+5.51
Greens	Claire Ogden	964	3.18	−0.34
United Australia	Shane Smeltz	244	0.81	+0.81
Total formal votes		30,273	96.48	+1.20
Informal votes		1,105	3.52	−1.20
Turnout		31,378	88.90	−1.04
Two-party-preferred result
Labor	Tom Smith	15,141	50.01	+4.21
Liberal National	David Batt	15,132	49.99	−4.21
Labor gain from Liberal National		Swing	+4.21	

=== Elections in the 2010s ===
2017 Queensland state election: Bundaberg
Party	Candidate	Votes	%	±%
Liberal National	David Batt	10,578	35.5	−6.9
Labor	Leanne Donaldson	10,232	34.4	−4.2
One Nation	Jane Truscott	6,681	22.4	+22.4
Greens	Marianne Buchanan	1,050	3.5	−0.6
Independent	Alan Corbett	681	2.3	+2.3
Independent	Richard Glass	313	1.1	+1.1
Independent	Richard Smith	248	0.8	+0.8
Total formal votes		29,783	95.3	−2.5
Informal votes		1,476	4.7	+2.5
Turnout		31,259	89.9	−0.7
Two-party-preferred result
Liberal National	David Batt	16,142	54.2	+4.7
Labor	Leanne Donaldson	13,641	45.8	−4.7
Liberal National gain from Labor		Swing	+4.7	

2015 Queensland state election: Bundaberg
Party	Candidate	Votes	%	±%
Liberal National	Jack Dempsey	11,128	41.45	−11.71
Labor	Leanne Donaldson	10,654	39.68	+15.96
Palmer United	Robert Brown	3,208	11.95	+11.95
Greens	Meg Anderson	1,112	4.14	+1.20
Independent	Richard Freudenberg	746	2.78	+2.78
Total formal votes		26,848	97.81	+0.21
Informal votes		602	2.19	−0.21
Turnout		27,450	91.67	+0.29
Two-party-preferred result
Labor	Leanne Donaldson	12,783	51.62	+19.79
Liberal National	Jack Dempsey	11,980	48.38	−19.79
Labor gain from Liberal National		Swing	+19.79	

2012 Queensland state election: Bundaberg
Party	Candidate	Votes	%	±%
Liberal National	Jack Dempsey	14,193	53.16	−0.55
Labor	Cindy Hyland	6,335	23.73	−17.85
Katter's Australian	Doug Anderson	4,117	15.42	+15.42
Family First	Trevor Versace	841	3.15	+3.15
Greens	Peter Higgins	785	2.94	−1.77
Independent	Peter Wyatt	428	1.60	+1.60
Total formal votes		26,699	97.59	−0.51
Informal votes		658	2.41	+0.51
Turnout		27,357	91.38	−0.42
Two-party-preferred result
Liberal National	Jack Dempsey	15,900	68.17	+12.15
Labor	Cindy Hyland	7,423	31.83	−12.15
Liberal National hold		Swing	+12.15	

=== Elections in the 2000s ===
2009 Queensland state election: Bundaberg
Party	Candidate	Votes	%	±%
Liberal National	Jack Dempsey	14,594	53.7	+9.0
Labor	Phil Freeman	11,297	41.6	−3.1
Greens	Erin Hall	1,281	4.7	+0.8
Total formal votes		27,172	98.0	
Informal votes		527	2.0	
Turnout		27,699	91.80	
Two-party-preferred result
Liberal National	Jack Dempsey	14,851	56.0	+5.0
Labor	Phil Freeman	11,660	44.0	−5.0
Liberal National hold		Swing	+5.0	

2006 Queensland state election: Bundaberg
Party	Candidate	Votes	%	±%
Labor	Sonja Cleary	11,437	44.7	−6.5
National	Jack Dempsey	11,400	44.6	+3.9
Independent	Gregory McMahon	1,731	6.8	+6.8
Greens	Willy Bach	1,002	3.9	−0.7
Total formal votes		25,570	97.8	−0.1
Informal votes		568	2.2	+0.1
Turnout		26,138	92.4	−0.4
Two-party-preferred result
National	Jack Dempsey	12,439	51.0	+6.3
Labor	Sonja Cleary	11,973	49.0	−6.3
National gain from Labor		Swing	+6.3	

2004 Queensland state election: Bundaberg
Party	Candidate	Votes	%	±%
Labor	Nita Cunningham	13,104	51.2	−13.7
National	Jack Dempsey	10,410	40.7	+5.6
Greens	Peter Ryan	1,171	4.6	+4.6
Independent	Adrian Wone	905	3.5	+3.5
Total formal votes		25,590	97.9	+2.1
Informal votes		544	2.1	−2.1
Turnout		26,134	92.8	−0.9
Two-party-preferred result
Labor	Nita Cunningham	13,551	55.3	−9.6
National	Jack Dempsey	10,960	44.7	+9.6
Labor hold		Swing	−9.6	

2001 Queensland state election: Bundaberg
Party	Candidate	Votes	%	±%
Labor	Nita Cunningham	15,812	64.9	+23.0
National	David Porter	8,552	35.1	+9.8
Total formal votes		24,364	95.8	
Informal votes		1,079	4.2	
Turnout		25,443	93.7	
Labor hold		Swing	+10.4	

=== Elections in the 1990s ===
1998 Queensland state election: Bundaberg
Party	Candidate	Votes	%	±%
Labor	Nita Cunningham	8,801	44.4	−6.1
One Nation	Bernard Barry	5,819	29.3	+29.3
National	David Porter	4,709	23.7	−25.7
Greens	Ray Pearce	303	1.5	+1.5
Democrats	Lance Hall	198	1.0	+1.0
Total formal votes		19,830	98.9	+0.4
Informal votes		213	1.1	−0.4
Turnout		20,043	93.5	+0.9
Two-candidate-preferred result
Labor	Nita Cunningham	9,743	52.0	+1.5
One Nation	Bernard Barry	8,979	48.0	+48.0
Labor hold		Swing	+1.5	

1995 Queensland state election: Bundaberg
Party	Candidate	Votes	%	±%
Labor	Clem Campbell	10,229	50.5	−0.7
National	Kay McDuff	10,024	49.5	+19.9
Total formal votes		20,253	98.5	+0.5
Informal votes		308	1.5	−0.5
Turnout		20,561	92.6	
Labor hold		Swing	−8.1	

1992 Queensland state election: Bundaberg
Party	Candidate	Votes	%	±%
Labor	Clem Campbell	10,597	51.2	−5.4
National	Paul Petrie	6,119	29.6	+0.2
Independent	Tony Barr	1,629	7.9	+7.9
Liberal	Cameron Dale	1,290	6.2	−4.0
Independent	Trevor Versace	1,065	5.1	+5.1
Total formal votes		20,700	98.0	
Informal votes		430	2.0	
Turnout		21,130	93.2	
Two-party-preferred result
Labor	Clem Campbell	11,223	58.7	−0.6
National	Paul Petrie	7,912	41.3	+0.6
Labor hold		Swing	−0.6	

=== Elections in the 1980s ===
1989 Queensland state election: Bundaberg
Party	Candidate	Votes	%	±%
Labor	Clem Campbell	10,171	57.9	+4.0
National	Mary Ann Walsh	5,316	30.3	−10.4
Liberal	Peter MacSween	1,773	10.1	+10.1
Grey Power	Linues Myles	300	1.7	+1.7
Total formal votes		17,560	97.9	−0.4
Informal votes		371	2.1	+0.4
Turnout		17,931	92.2	−0.8
Two-party-preferred result
Labor	Clem Campbell	10,606	60.4	+3.8
National	Mary Ann Walsh	6,954	39.6	−3.8
Labor hold		Swing	+3.8	

1986 Queensland state election: Bundaberg
Party	Candidate	Votes	%	±%
Labor	Clem Campbell	9,223	53.9	+1.9
National	Heather Galley	6,977	40.7	−0.8
Independent	Alex Warren	928	5.4	−1.1
Total formal votes		17,128	98.3	
Informal votes		290	1.7	
Turnout		17,418	93.0	
Two-party-preferred result
Labor	Clem Campbell	9,694	56.6	+2.3
National	Heather Galley	7,434	43.4	−2.3
Labor hold		Swing	+2.3	

1983 Queensland state election: Bundaberg
Party	Candidate	Votes	%	±%
Labor	Clem Campbell	7,676	52.0	−2.3
National	Des Barritt	6,122	41.5	+6.3
Democrats	Alex Warren	956	6.5	+1.5
Total formal votes		14,754	99.1	−0.1
Informal votes		138	0.9	+0.1
Turnout		14,892	93.7	+2.2
Two-party-preferred result
Labor	Clem Campbell	8,154	55.3	−3.0
National	Des Barritt	6,600	44.7	+3.0
Labor hold		Swing	−3.0	

1980 Queensland state election: Bundaberg
Party	Candidate	Votes	%	±%
Labor	Jim Blake	7,694	54.3	+5.6
National	Bryan Conquest	4,991	35.2	+3.6
Liberal	Graham Quirk	787	5.5	−7.6
Democrats	Lola Lomax	706	5.0	+5.0
Total formal votes		14,178	99.2	+0.2
Informal votes		120	0.8	−0.2
Turnout		14,298	91.5	−2.0
Two-party-preferred result
Labor	Jim Blake	8,270	58.3	+3.9
National	Bryan Conquest	5,908	41.7	−3.9
Labor hold		Swing	+3.9	

=== Elections in the 1970s ===
1977 Queensland state election: Bundaberg
Party	Candidate	Votes	%	±%
Labor	Jim Blake	6,898	48.7	−0.8
National	Bryan Conquest	4,471	31.6	+0.5
Liberal	John Heaps	1,863	13.2	−3.4
Independent	Lou Jensen	930	6.6	+6.6
Total formal votes		14,162	99.0	
Informal votes		148	1.0	
Turnout		14,310	93.5	
Two-party-preferred result
Labor	Jim Blake	7,705	54.4	+3.1
National	Bryan Conquest	6,457	44.6	−3.1
Labor hold		Swing	+3.1	

1974 Queensland state election: Bundaberg
Party	Candidate	Votes	%	±%
Labor	Lou Jensen	5,363	49.5	−19.4
National	David Jenkin	3,369	31.1	+31.1
Liberal	Keith Powell	1,796	16.6	+16.6
Queensland Labor	Alan Birchley	310	2.9	−28.2
Total formal votes		10,838	98.8	+0.6
Informal votes		127	1.2	−0.6
Turnout		10,965	93.3	+0.4
Two-party-preferred result
Labor	Lou Jensen	5,694	52.5	−2.3
National	David Jenken	5,144	47.5	+2.3
Labor hold		Swing	−2.3	

1972 Queensland state election: Bundaberg
Party	Candidate	Votes	%	±%
Labor	Lou Jensen	6,940	68.9	+19.4
Queensland Labor	Alan Birchley	3,128	31.1	+28.4
Total formal votes		10,068	98.2	
Informal votes		185	1.8	
Turnout		10,253	92.9	
Labor hold		Swing	+10.6	

=== Elections in the 1960s ===
1969 Queensland state election: Bundaberg
Party	Candidate	Votes	%	±%
Labor	Lou Jensen	7,155	49.5	+3.0
Country	Paul Neville	4,522	31.1	+31.1
Independent	Clifford Nielsen	1,525	10.5	+10.5
Liberal	Stanley Smith	623	4.3	+4.3
Queensland Labor	William Hutchinson	389	2.7	+2.7
Independent	Seth Cottell	324	2.2	+2.2
Total formal votes		14,538	97.3	−1.8
Informal votes		404	2.7	+1.8
Turnout		14,942	94.2	+0.4
Two-party-preferred result
Labor	Lou Jensen	8,450	58.1	+11.6
Country	Paul Neville	6,088	41.9	+41.9
Labor gain from Independent		Swing	+11.6	

1966 Queensland state election: Bundaberg
Party	Candidate	Votes	%	±%
Independent	Ted Walsh	7,492	53.5	0.0
Labor	Matt Tallon	6,516	46.5	0.0
Total formal votes		14,008	99.1	+0.2
Informal votes		133	0.9	−0.2
Turnout		14,141	93.8	−1.1
Independent hold		Swing	0.0	

1963 Queensland state election: Bundaberg
Party	Candidate	Votes	%	±%
Independent	Ted Walsh	7,011	53.5	+53.5
Labor	Matthew Tallon	6,103	46.5	+6.1
Total formal votes		13,114	98.9	+0.8
Informal votes		146	1.1	−0.8
Turnout		13,260	94.9	0.0
Independent gain from Queensland Labor		Swing	N/A	

1960 Queensland state election: Bundaberg
Party	Candidate	Votes	%	±%
Queensland Labor	Ted Walsh	5,138	40.5	
Labor	John Salter	5,122	40.4	
Liberal	Robert Howard	2,415	19.1	
Total formal votes		12,675	98.1	
Informal votes		245	1.9	
Turnout		12,920	94.9	
Queensland Labor hold		Swing		

=== Elections in the 1950s ===
1957 Queensland state election: Bundaberg
Party	Candidate	Votes	%	±%
Queensland Labor	Ted Walsh	6,058	53.8	+53.8
Country	Thomas Pulsford	2,652	23.6	+23.6
Labor	William Elson-Green	2,543	22.6	−77.4
Total formal votes		11,253	99.4	
Informal votes		73	0.6	
Turnout		11,326	94.3	
Queensland Labor gain from Labor		Swing	N/A	

1956 Queensland state election: Bundaberg
Party	Candidate	Votes	%	±%
Labor	Ted Walsh	unopposed		
Labor hold		Swing		

1953 Queensland state election: Bundaberg
Party	Candidate	Votes	%	±%
Labor	Ted Walsh	6,513	65.6	+21.0
Liberal	Willie Howard	2,865	28.9	+3.1
Independent	James Julin	549	5.5	+5.5
Total formal votes		9,927	99.3	+1.7
Informal votes		67	0.7	−1.7
Turnout		9,994	94.5	−1.0
Labor hold		Swing	+6.0	

1950 Queensland state election: Bundaberg
Party	Candidate	Votes	%	±%
Labor	Ted Walsh	4,152	44.6	
Frank Barnes Labor	Frank Barnes	2,759	29.6	
Liberal	Frank Row	2,401	25.8	
Total formal votes		9,312	97.6	
Informal votes		230	2.4	
Turnout		9,542	95.5	
Labor gain from Frank Barnes Labor		Swing		

=== Elections in the 1940s ===
1947 Queensland state election: Bundaberg
Party	Candidate	Votes	%	±%
Frank Barnes Labor	Frank Barnes	4,828	40.4	+0.4
Labor	Viv Brown	3,940	33.0	−0.4
People's Party	Geoffrey Boreham	3,185	26.6	+5.4
Total formal votes		11,953	99.4	+1.1
Informal votes		73	0.6	−1.1
Turnout		12,026	91.8	+3.5
Frank Barnes Labor hold		Swing	+0.6	

1944 Queensland state election: Bundaberg
Party	Candidate	Votes	%	±%
Frank Barnes Labor	Frank Barnes	4,180	40.0	−11.1
Labor	Bernard McLean	3,495	33.4	−15.5
People's Party	Tom McCracken	2,218	21.2	+21.2
Independent Labor	Arthur Howe	432	4.1	+4.1
Independent	Alfred Maughan	136	1.3	+1.3
Total formal votes		10,461	98.3	+0.5
Informal votes		182	1.7	−0.5
Turnout		10,643	88.3	−5.1
Frank Barnes Labor hold		Swing	+3.4	

1941 Queensland state election: Bundaberg
Party	Candidate	Votes	%	±%
Independent Labor	Frank Barnes	5,476	51.1	+51.1
Labor	Bernard McLean	4,356	48.9	+4.8
Total formal votes		10,715	97.8	−1.4
Informal votes		246	2.2	+1.4
Turnout		10,961	93.4	−2.1
Independent Labor gain from Labor		Swing	N/A	

=== Elections in the 1930s ===
1938 Queensland state election: Bundaberg
Party	Candidate	Votes	%	±%
Labor	Bernard McLean	4,356	44.1	−8.3
Country	Laurence Scotney	2,393	24.2	+10.1
Social Credit	Henry Clegton	1,699	17.2	−16.3
Protestant Labour	Ernest Miles	1,439	14.6	−18.9
Total formal votes		9,887	99.2	−0.1
Informal votes		83	0.8	+0.1
Turnout		9,970	95.5	−1.2
Two-party-preferred result
Labor	Bernard McLean	4,694	59.1	
Country	Laurence Scotney	3,247	40.9	
Labor hold		Swing	N/A	

1935 Queensland state election: Bundaberg
Party	Candidate	Votes	%	±%
Labor	Bernard McLean	4,738	52.4	
Social Credit	Henry Clegton	3,029	33.5	
CPNP	Edward Redmond	1,279	14.1	
Total formal votes		9,046	99.3	
Informal votes		62	0.7	
Turnout		9,108	96.7	
Labor hold		Swing		

- Preferences were not distributed.

1932 Queensland state election: Bundaberg
Party	Candidate	Votes	%	±%
Labor	George Barber	unopposed		
Labor hold		Swing		

=== Elections in the 1920s ===
1929 Queensland state election: Bundaberg
Party	Candidate	Votes	%	±%
Labor	George Barber	3,816	51.1	−8.3
CPNP	Andrew Christiansen	3,651	48.9	+8.3
Total formal votes		7,467	98.7	−0.2
Informal votes		96	1.3	+0.2
Turnout		7,563	93.5	+1.5
Labor hold		Swing	−8.3	

1926 Queensland state election: Bundaberg
Party	Candidate	Votes	%	±%
Labor	George Barber	4,158	59.4	+0.4
CPNP	William Gavegan	2,844	40.6	−0.4
Total formal votes		7,002	98.9	−0.4
Informal votes		76	1.1	+0.4
Turnout		7,078	92.0	+4.8
Labor hold		Swing	+0.4	

1923 Queensland state election: Bundaberg
Party	Candidate	Votes	%	±%
Labor	George Barber	3,777	59.0	+1.6
Country	Henry Cattermull	2,628	41.0	−1.6
Total formal votes		6,405	99.3	+0.5
Informal votes		48	0.7	−0.5
Turnout		6,453	87.2	+13.4
Labor hold		Swing	+1.6	

1920 Queensland state election: Bundaberg
Party	Candidate	Votes	%	±%
Labor	George Barber	2,788	57.4	−9.1
Country	John Forgan	2,073	42.6	+42.6
Total formal votes		4,861	98.8	−0.5
Informal votes		60	1.2	+0.5
Turnout		4,921	73.8	−9.2
Labor hold		Swing	−9.1	

=== Elections in the 1910s ===
1918 Queensland state election: Bundaberg
Party	Candidate	Votes	%	±%
Labor	George Barber	3,184	66.5	−2.5
National	William Foster	1,607	33.5	+2.5
Total formal votes		4,785	99.3	+0.7
Informal votes		36	0.7	−0.7
Turnout		4,821	83.0	−5.8
Labor hold		Swing	−2.5	

1915 Queensland state election: Bundaberg
Party	Candidate	Votes	%	±%
Labor	George Barber	2,920	69.0	+13.3
Liberal	Lancelot Wilkinson	1,311	31.0	−13.3
Total formal votes		4,231	98.6	−0.8
Informal votes		61	1.4	+0.8
Turnout		4,292	88.8	+5.6
Labor hold		Swing	+13.3	

1912 Queensland state election: Bundaberg
Party	Candidate	Votes	%	±%
Labor	George Barber	1,926	55.7	
Liberal	James Macleod	1,531	44.3	
Total formal votes		3,457	99.4	
Informal votes		22	0.6	
Turnout		3,479	83.2	
Labor hold		Swing		
