= Results of the 1969 Queensland state election =

Queensland state election, 17 May 1969 Legislative Assembly << 1966–1972 >>
Enrolled voters	945,583				
Votes cast	867,743		Turnout	91.77%	–1.50%
Informal votes	15,566		Informal	1.79%	+0.16%
Summary of votes by party
Party	Primary votes	%	Swing	Seats	Change
Labor	383,388	44.99%	+1.15%	31	+4
Liberal	201,765	23.68%	–1.81%	19	–1
Country	179,125	21.02%	+1.73%	26	±0
Queensland Labor	61,661	7.24%	+0.99%	1	±0
Independent	24,268	2.85%	–1.91%	2	–3
Total	852,177			78	

This is a list of electoral district results for the 1969 Queensland state election.

== Results by electoral district ==
=== Albert ===
1969 Queensland state election: Albert
Party	Candidate	Votes	%	±%
Country	Cec Carey	7,081	50.6	+8.9
Labor	William Wollstein	2,750	19.6	−1.4
Independent	Ernest Harley	1,970	14.1	+14.1
Liberal	Paul Scanlan	1,804	12.9	−20.4
Queensland Labor	Brian Balaam	361	2.6	−1.4
Independent	William Steer	35	0.3	+0.3
Total formal votes		14,001	97.6	−1.5
Informal votes		351	2.4	+1.5
Turnout		14,352	89.3	−2.8
Two-party-preferred result
Country	Cec Carey	10,530	75.2	+1.6
Labor	William Wollstein	3,471	24.8	−1.6
Country hold		Swing	+1.6	

==== By-election ====
- This by-election was caused by the death of Cec Carey. It was held on 14 February 1970.

1970 Albert state by-election
Party	Candidate	Votes	%	±%
Labor	Bill D'Arcy	6,143	43.0	+23.4
Liberal	Bill Heatley	3,899	27.3	+14.4
Country	Don Beck	3,820	26.7	−23.9
Independent	Eric Nunn	416	2.9	+2.9
Total formal votes		14,278	99.0	+1.4
Informal votes		148	1.0	−1.4
Turnout		14,426	88.7	−0.6
Two-party-preferred result
Liberal	Bill Heatley	7,206	50.5	+50.5
Labor	Bill D'Arcy	7,072	49.5	+24.7
Liberal gain from Country		Swing	N/A	

=== Ashgrove ===
1969 Queensland state election: Ashgrove
Party	Candidate	Votes	%	±%
Liberal	Douglas Tooth	4,581	45.6	−8.3
Labor	Haydn Sargent	4,481	44.6	+8.6
Queensland Labor	George Cook	986	9.8	−0.3
Total formal votes		10,048	98.7	+0.4
Informal votes		129	1.3	−0.4
Turnout		10,177	92.5	−1.8
Two-party-preferred result
Liberal	Douglas Tooth	5,305	52.8	−8.4
Labor	Haydn Sargent	4,743	47.2	+8.4
Liberal hold		Swing	−8.4	

=== Aspley ===
1969 Queensland state election: Aspley
Party	Candidate	Votes	%	±%
Liberal	Fred Campbell	9,342	48.4	−4.0
Labor	Roy Harvey	8,255	42.8	+3.9
Queensland Labor	Anthony Macklin	1,700	8.8	+0.1
Total formal votes		19,019	98.6	−0.2
Informal votes		278	1.4	+0.2
Turnout		19,297	93.3	−1.0
Two-party-preferred result
Liberal	Fred Campbell	10,713	55.5	−4.0
Labor	Roy Harvey	8,584	44.5	+4.0
Liberal hold		Swing	−4.0	

=== Aubigny ===
1969 Queensland state election: Aubigny
Party	Candidate	Votes	%	±%
Queensland Labor	Les Diplock	5,065	55.4	−0.9
Country	Peter Paull	2,646	28.9	−2.2
Labor	Thomas Wilson	1,430	15.6	+3.0
Total formal votes		9,141	99.0	+0.2
Informal votes		93	1.0	−0.2
Turnout		9,234	94.9	−0.5
Two-candidate-preferred result
Queensland Labor	Les Diplock	5,780	63.2	+0.6
Country	Peter Paull	3,361	36.8	−0.6
Queensland Labor hold		Swing	+0.6	

=== Balonne ===
1969 Queensland state election: Balonne
Party	Candidate	Votes	%	±%
Country	Harold Hungerford	3,654	58.9	−3.8
Labor	Ben Ward	2,552	41.1	+3.8
Total formal votes		6,155	99.2	+0.2
Informal votes		51	0.8	−0.2
Turnout		6,206	89.6	+0.6
Country hold		Swing	−3.8	

=== Barambah ===
1969 Queensland state election: Barambah
Party	Candidate	Votes	%	±%
Country	Joh Bjelke-Petersen	6,965	78.2	+4.0
Labor	Norman Hasemann	1,941	21.8	−4.0
Total formal votes		8,906	98.9	+0.3
Informal votes		96	1.1	−0.3
Turnout		9,002	95.0	−0.9
Country hold		Swing	+4.0	

=== Barcoo ===
1969 Queensland state election: Barcoo
Party	Candidate	Votes	%	±%
Labor	Eugene O'Donnell	4,593	57.5	−1.5
Country	Harold Braun	2,980	37.3	+2.2
Queensland Labor	Edwin Eshmann	419	5.2	−0.7
Total formal votes		7,911	99.0	+0.4
Informal votes		81	1.0	−0.4
Turnout		7,992	91.2	−1.0
Two-party-preferred result
Labor	Eugene O'Donnell	4,671	58.4	−1.7
Country	Harold Braun	3,321	41.6	+1.7
Labor hold		Swing	−1.7	

=== Baroona ===
1969 Queensland state election: Baroona
Party	Candidate	Votes	%	±%
Labor	Pat Hanlon	6,427	63.8	+4.1
Liberal	Thomas Bence	2,648	26.3	−4.8
Queensland Labor	Anthony Machin	998	9.9	+2.2
Total formal votes		10,073	97.2	+0.3
Informal votes		288	2.8	−0.3
Turnout		10,361	88.8	−2.9
Two-party-preferred result
Labor	Pat Hanlon	6,613	65.7	+3.4
Liberal	Thomas Bence	3,460	34.4	−3.4
Labor hold		Swing	+3.4	

=== Belmont ===
1969 Queensland state election: Belmont
Party	Candidate	Votes	%	±%
Labor	Fred Newton	10,399	57.5	−0.5
Liberal	Cyril Morgan	6,405	34.4	−1.4
Queensland Labor	John Taylor	1,285	7.1	+0.9
Total formal votes		18,089	98.0	−0.2
Informal votes		364	2.0	+0.2
Turnout		18,453	93.3	−0.8
Two-party-preferred result
Labor	Fred Newton	10,638	58.8	−1.3
Liberal	Cyril Morgan	7,451	41.2	+1.3
Labor hold		Swing	−1.3	

=== Bowen ===
1969 Queensland state election: Bowen
Party	Candidate	Votes	%	±%
Liberal	Peter Delamothe	3,814	51.4	+0.2
Labor	Leonard Bidgood	3,599	48.6	+5.2
Total formal votes		7,413	98.6	−0.1
Informal votes		105	1.4	+0.1
Turnout		7,518	93.9	−1.5
Liberal hold		Swing	−4.1	

=== Brisbane ===
1969 Queensland state election: Brisbane
Party	Candidate	Votes	%	±%
Labor	Brian Davis	4,162	56.2	+0.3
Liberal	Neville Jackson	2,200	29.7	−2.8
Queensland Labor	Patrick Hallinan	1,040	14.1	+2.5
Total formal votes		7,402	96.1	0.0
Informal votes		303	3.9	0.0
Turnout		7,705	84.7	−1.3
Two-party-preferred result
Labor	Brian Davis	4,355	58.8	+0.8
Liberal	Neville Jackson	3,047	41.2	−0.8
Labor hold		Swing	+0.8	

=== Bulimba ===
1969 Queensland state election: Bulimba
Party	Candidate	Votes	%	±%
Labor	Jack Houston	8,494	66.5	+2.7
Liberal	Megan Wilding	3,350	26.2	−4.4
Queensland Labor	Paul Tucker	937	7.3	+1.6
Total formal votes		12,781	98.1	−0.5
Informal votes		246	1.9	+0.5
Turnout		13,027	93.8	−1.0
Two-party-preferred result
Labor	Jack Houston	8,669	67.8	+3.0
Liberal	Megan Wilding	4,112	32.2	−3.0
Labor hold		Swing	+3.0	

=== Bundaberg ===
1969 Queensland state election: Bundaberg
Party	Candidate	Votes	%	±%
Labor	Lou Jensen	7,155	49.5	+3.0
Country	Paul Neville	4,522	31.1	+31.1
Independent	Clifford Nielsen	1,525	10.5	+10.5
Liberal	Stanley Smith	623	4.3	+4.3
Queensland Labor	William Hutchinson	389	2.7	+2.7
Independent	Seth Cottell	324	2.2	+2.2
Total formal votes		14,538	97.3	−1.8
Informal votes		404	2.7	+1.8
Turnout		14,942	94.2	+0.4
Two-party-preferred result
Labor	Lou Jensen	8,450	58.1	+11.6
Country	Paul Neville	6,088	41.9	+41.9
Labor gain from Independent		Swing	+11.6	

=== Burdekin ===
1969 Queensland state election: Burdekin
Party	Candidate	Votes	%	±%
Labor	Ronald Nuttall	3,007	41.5	+17.6
Country	Val Bird	2,313	31.9	+31.9
Liberal	Stanley Pearce	1,369	18.9	−0.5
Queensland Labor	Emil Liebrecht	556	7.7	−3.4
Total formal votes		7,245	96.6	−1.7
Informal votes		252	3.4	+1.7
Turnout		7,497	93.0	−1.4
Two-party-preferred result
Country	Val Bird	3,927	54.2	+54.2
Labor	Ronald Nuttall	3,318	45.8	+2.7
Country gain from Independent		Swing	+54.2	

=== Burke ===
1969 Queensland state election: Burke
Party	Candidate	Votes	%	±%
Labor	Alec Inch	4,949	58.5	−4.1
Country	William Aplin	2,739	32.4	+7.9
Social Credit	John Donaldson	777	9.2	−3.8
Total formal votes		8,465	96.8	−0.7
Informal votes		280	3.2	+0.7
Turnout		8,745	81.3	0.0
Two-party-preferred result
Labor	Alex Inch	5,337	63.0	−6.0
Country	William Aplin	3,128	37.0	+6.0
Labor hold		Swing	−6.0	

=== Burnett ===
1969 Queensland state election: Burnett
Party	Candidate	Votes	%	±%
Country	Claude Wharton	6,257	65.9	+2.3
Labor	Alexander Craig	3,235	34.1	−2.3
Total formal votes		9,492	98.9	0.0
Informal votes		105	1.1	0.0
Turnout		9,597	94.3	−0.3
Country hold		Swing	+2.3	

=== Cairns ===
1969 Queensland state election: Cairns
Party	Candidate	Votes	%	±%
Labor	Ray Jones	7,905	60.1	+8.8
Country	Victor Piccone	2,194	16.7	+4.2
Liberal	David De Jarlais	1,853	14.1	−3.9
Independent	Phyllis Penridge	717	5.5	+5.5
Queensland Labor	Edward Svendsen	493	3.7	+2.1
Total formal votes		13,162	97.9	+1.9
Informal votes		288	2.1	−1.9
Turnout		13,450	91.8	−1.6
Two-party-preferred result
Labor	Ray Jones	8,615	65.5	+3.9
Country	Victor Piccone	4,547	34.5	−3.9
Labor hold		Swing	+3.9	

=== Callide ===
1969 Queensland state election: Callide
Party	Candidate	Votes	%	±%
Country	Vince Jones	3,830	43.2	−10.6
Labor	Charles Tutt	3,236	36.5	+3.3
Independent	Edgar Shields	904	10.2	+10.2
Queensland Labor	Edgar Lanigan	892	10.1	−2.9
Total formal votes		8,862	98.6	−0.1
Informal votes		125	1.4	+0.1
Turnout		8,987	92.0	−1.7
Two-party-preferred result
Country	Vince Jones	5,030	56.8	−7.6
Labor	Charles Tutt	3,832	43.2	+7.6
Country hold		Swing	−7.6	

=== Carnarvon ===
1969 Queensland state election: Carnarvon
Party	Candidate	Votes	%	±%
Country	Henry McKechnie	4,791	56.4	−0.4
Labor	Arthur Johnson	2,762	32.5	+4.2
Queensland Labor	Frederick Burges	937	11.0	−3.8
Total formal votes		8,490	98.6	+0.2
Informal votes		123	1.4	−0.2
Turnout		8,613	92.7	−0.8
Two-party-preferred result
Country	Henry McKechnie	5,471	64.4	−3.2
Labor	Arthur Johnson	3,019	35.6	+3.2
Country hold		Swing	−3.2	

=== Chatsworth ===
1969 Queensland state election: Chatsworth
Party	Candidate	Votes	%	±%
Liberal	Bill Hewitt	5,632	52.8	+3.5
Labor	John Cleary	4,265	40.0	0.0
Queensland Labor	Leonard Galligan	769	7.2	+0.7
Total formal votes		10,666	98.5	+0.2
Informal votes		167	1.5	−0.2
Turnout		10,833	93.9	−1.4
Two-party-preferred result
Liberal	Bill Hewitt	6,258	58.7	+2.2
Labor	John Cleary	4,408	41.3	−2.2
Liberal hold		Swing	+2.2	

=== Clayfield ===
1969 Queensland state election: Clayfield
Party	Candidate	Votes	%	±%
Liberal	John Murray	5,064	51.6	−4.6
Labor	David Hunter	3,578	36.4	+3.2
Queensland Labor	Francis Andrews	1,178	12.0	+1.4
Total formal votes		9,820	98.5	+0.7
Informal votes		154	1.5	−0.7
Turnout		9,974	89.6	−2.8
Two-party-preferred result
Liberal	John Murray	5,919	60.3	−4.6
Labor	David Hunter	3,901	39.7	+4.6
Liberal hold		Swing	−4.6	

=== Condamine ===
1969 Queensland state election: Condamine
Party	Candidate	Votes	%	±%
Country	Vic Sullivan	5,227	77.3	0.0
Labor	Nico Bos	1,531	22.7	0.0
Total formal votes		6,758	98.9	−0.1
Informal votes		78	1.1	+0.1
Turnout		6,836	93.9	−0.8
Country hold		Swing	0.0	

=== Cook ===
1969 Queensland state election: Cook
Party	Candidate	Votes	%	±%
Labor	Bill Wood	6,154	52.9	+8.1
Country	James Bidner	4,593	39.5	+39.5
Independent	John Allan	507	4.4	+4.4
Queensland Labor	Thomas White	227	1.9	+1.9
Independent	Ernest Hall	146	1.3	+1.3
Total formal votes		11,627	96.4	−2.1
Informal votes		435	3.6	+2.1
Turnout		12,062	90.0	−1.3
Two-party-preferred result
Labor	Bill Wood	6,522	56.1	+11.3
Country	James Bidner	5,105	43.9	+43.9
Labor gain from Independent		Swing	+11.3	

=== Cooroora ===
1969 Queensland state election: Cooroora
Party	Candidate	Votes	%	±%
Country	David Low	6,116	62.1	+2.1
Labor	Lutgerdienko Hoiting	2,991	30.4	−9.6
Queensland Labor	Alexander Browne	744	7.5	+7.5
Total formal votes		9,851	98.4	−0.4
Informal votes		161	1.6	+0.4
Turnout		10,012	93.4	−0.3
Two-party-preferred result
Country	David Low	6,656	67.6	+7.6
Labor	Lutgerdienko Hoiting	3,195	32.4	−7.6
Country hold		Swing	+7.6	

=== Cunningham ===
1969 Queensland state election: Cunningham
Party	Candidate	Votes	%	±%
Country	Alan Fletcher	4,340	59.1	−13.1
Labor	Nelson Mann	2,122	28.9	+12.5
Queensland Labor	Eugene Connolly	879	12.0	+0.6
Total formal votes		7,341	98.9	−0.4
Informal votes		81	1.1	+0.4
Turnout		7,422	95.6	−0.1
Two-party-preferred result
Country	Alan Fletcher	5,080	69.2	−11.3
Labor	Nelson Mann	2,261	30.8	+11.3
Country hold		Swing	−11.3	

=== Fassifern ===
1969 Queensland state election: Fassifern
Party	Candidate	Votes	%	±%
Country	Selwyn Muller	5,240	57.8	−6.1
Labor	Jack Jones	3,076	33.9	+6.1
Queensland Labor	Gordon Blain	572	6.3	+0.3
Social Credit	Victor Robb	183	2.0	−0.3
Total formal votes		9,071	98.4	−0.3
Informal votes		149	1.6	+0.3
Turnout		9,220	94.1	−1.3
Two-party-preferred result
Country	Selwyn Muller	5,747	63.4	−6.7
Labor	Jack Jones	3,324	36.6	+6.7
Country hold		Swing	−6.7	

=== Flinders ===
1969 Queensland state election: Flinders
Party	Candidate	Votes	%	±%
Country	Bill Longeran	3,885	55.1	−6.3
Labor	Douglas Lloyd	3,170	44.9	+10.4
Total formal votes		7,055	99.2	+0.8
Informal votes		57	0.8	−0.8
Turnout		7,112	89.4	−1.2
Country hold		Swing	−9.4	

=== Greenslopes ===
1969 Queensland state election: Greenslopes
Party	Candidate	Votes	%	±%
Liberal	Keith Hooper	5,953	54.5	−0.3
Labor	Kath Walker	3,882	35.6	−0.1
Queensland Labor	Harry Wright	1,083	9.9	+0.4
Total formal votes		10,918	98.5	−0.2
Informal votes		171	1.5	+0.2
Turnout		11,089	92.8	−1.1
Two-party-preferred result
Liberal	Keith Hooper	6,835	62.6	0.0
Labor	Kath Walker	4,083	37.4	0.0
Liberal hold		Swing	0.0	

=== Gregory ===
1969 Queensland state election: Gregory
Party	Candidate	Votes	%	±%
Country	Wally Rae	3,724	62.7	+3.6
Labor	John Thomas	2,217	37.3	−0.9
Total formal votes		5,941	99.0	−0.1
Informal votes		57	1.0	+0.1
Turnout		5,998	85.4	−0.8
Country hold		Swing	+1.4	

=== Gympie ===
1969 Queensland state election: Gympie
Party	Candidate	Votes	%	±%
Country	Max Hodges	5,608	58.3	+1.0
Labor	Jack Ison	2,992	31.1	−4.7
Queensland Labor	Denis Tanner	525	5.5	−1.4
Independent	Cecil Rivers	388	4.0	+4.0
Independent	Bernard Thomas	98	1.0	+1.0
Total formal votes		9,611	98.1	−1.0
Informal votes		184	1.9	+1.0
Turnout		9,795	94.9	−1.0
Two-party-preferred result
Country	Max Hodges	6,278	65.3	+2.4
Labor	Jack Ison	3,333	34.7	−2.4
Country hold		Swing	+2.4	

=== Hawthorne ===
1969 Queensland state election: Hawthorne
Party	Candidate	Votes	%	±%
Labor	Ernest Adsett	5,020	48.9	+8.4
Liberal	Bill Kaus	4,408	42.9	+5.6
Queensland Labor	James Moss	848	8.3	+0.8
Total formal votes		10,276	98.3	−0.1
Informal votes		178	1.7	+0.1
Turnout		10,454	92.4	−1.7
Two-party-preferred result
Liberal	Bill Kaus	5,140	50.02	−2.5
Labor	Ernest Adsett	5,136	49.98	+2.5
Liberal hold		Swing	−2.5	

=== Hinchinbrook ===
1969 Queensland state election: Hinchinbrook
Party	Candidate	Votes	%	±%
Country	John Row	4,620	55.7	−7.4
Labor	Frederick Page	2,735	33.0	+3.5
Queensland Labor	John Williams	943	11.4	+4.0
Total formal votes		8,298	97.3	+0.2
Informal votes		234	2.7	−0.2
Turnout		8,532	91.3	−2.0
Two-party-preferred result
Country	John Row	5,388	64.9	−4.2
Labor	Frederick Page	2,910	35.1	+4.2
Country hold		Swing	−4.2	

=== Ipswich East ===
1969 Queensland state election: Ipswich East
Party	Candidate	Votes	%	±%
Labor	Evan Marginson	8,889	58.4	−10.1
Liberal	John Shapcott	5,714	37.5	+13.1
Queensland Labor	Peter Grant	620	4.1	+4.1
Total formal votes		15,223	97.5	−1.0
Informal votes		388	2.5	+1.0
Turnout		15,611	93.1	+2.7
Two-party-preferred result
Labor	Evan Marginson	9,059	59.5	−13.3
Liberal	John Shapcott	6,164	40.5	+13.3
Labor hold		Swing	−13.3	

=== Ipswich West ===
1969 Queensland state election: Ipswich West
Party	Candidate	Votes	%	±%
Labor	Vi Jordan	7,128	53.7	+6.2
Liberal	Allan Whybird	4,861	36.6	+18.1
Queensland Labor	Francis Carroll	1,296	9.8	+7.5
Total formal votes		13,285	98.2	−0.5
Informal votes		239	1.8	+0.5
Turnout		13,524	90.9	+0.5
Two-party-preferred result
Labor	Vi Jordan	7,483	56.3	−11.3
Liberal	Allan Whybird	5,802	43.7	+11.3
Labor hold		Swing	−11.3	

=== Isis ===
1969 Queensland state election: Isis
Party	Candidate	Votes	%	±%
Labor	Jim Blake	5,013	54.1	+18.8
Country	Harold Bonanno	4,073	43.9	−13.8
Queensland Labor	Matthews Minnegal	184	2.0	−5.0
Total formal votes		9,270	99.0	+0.8
Informal votes		96	1.0	−0.8
Turnout		9,366	96.0	+1.4
Two-party-preferred result
Labor	Jim Blake	5,057	54.4	+17.2
Country	Harold Bonnano	4,223	45.6	−17.2
Labor hold		Swing	+17.2	

=== Ithaca ===
1969 Queensland state election: Ithaca
Party	Candidate	Votes	%	±%
Liberal	Col Miller	5,206	49.8	+0.8
Labor	Sylvester Martin	4,355	41.7	+0.8
Queensland Labor	Anne Wenck	890	8.5	−1.5
Total formal votes		10,451	98.2	−0.3
Informal votes		191	1.8	+0.3
Turnout		10,642	90.7	−3.0
Two-party-preferred result
Liberal	Col Miller	5,953	56.8	+0.6
Labor	Sylvester Martin	4,518	43.2	−0.6
Liberal hold		Swing	+0.6	

=== Kedron ===
1969 Queensland state election: Kedron
Party	Candidate	Votes	%	±%
Labor	Eric Lloyd	7,732	59.9	−0.6
Liberal	William Battershill	4,014	31.1	+0.4
Queensland Labor	Gavan Duffy	1,157	9.0	+0.2
Total formal votes		12,903	98.5	0.0
Informal votes		200	1.5	0.0
Turnout		13,103	93.1	−1.7
Two-party-preferred result
Labor	Eric Lloyd	7,947	61.6	−0.3
Liberal	William Battershill	4,956	38.4	+0.3
Labor hold		Swing	−0.3	

=== Kurilpa ===
1969 Queensland state election: Kurilpa
Party	Candidate	Votes	%	±%
Liberal	Clive Hughes	4,657	49.1	−4.7
Labor	Ian Brusasco	4,090	43.1	+2.5
Queensland Labor	Edward Doherty	742	7.8	+3.1
Total formal votes		9,489	97.5	+0.7
Informal votes		244	2.5	−0.7
Turnout		9,733	88.8	−5.3
Two-party-preferred result
Liberal	Clive Hughes	5,213	54.9	−3.2
Labor	Ian Brusasco	4,276	45.1	+3.2
Liberal hold		Swing	−3.2	

=== Landsborough ===
1969 Queensland state election: Landsborough
Party	Candidate	Votes	%	±%
Country	Mike Ahern	6,781	63.3	−8.0
Labor	Peter Venning	3,110	29.0	+0.3
Independent	Basil Nettleton	825	7.7	+7.7
Total formal votes		10,716	97.8	−0.7
Informal votes		246	2.2	+0.7
Turnout		10,962	93.6	−0.5
Two-party-preferred result
Country	Mike Ahern	7,358	68.7	−2.6
Labor	Peter Venning	3,358	31.3	+2.6
Country hold		Swing	−2.6	

=== Lockyer ===
1969 Queensland state election: Lockyer
Party	Candidate	Votes	%	±%
Liberal	Gordon Chalk	5,235	63.6	−3.3
Independent	James Ryan	2,277	27.7	+27.7
Queensland Labor	Bailey Pashley	723	8.8	+8.8
Total formal votes		8,235	99.3	−0.1
Informal votes		61	0.7	+0.1
Turnout		8,296	95.4	−0.5
Two-candidate-preferred result
Liberal	Gordon Chalk	5,824	70.7	+3.9
Independent	James Ryan	2,411	29.3	+29.3
Liberal hold		Swing	+3.9	

=== Logan ===
1969 Queensland state election: Logan
Party	Candidate	Votes	%	±%
Labor	Ted Baldwin	6,997	49.2	+12.0
Country	Dick Wood	6,192	43.5	+11.8
Queensland Labor	Michael Scragg	1,043	7.3	+5.5
Total formal votes		14,232	96.9	+0.1
Informal votes		454	3.1	−0.1
Turnout		14,686	90.2	−3.2
Two-party-preferred result
Labor	Ted Baldwin	7,338	51.6	+4.8
Country	Dick Wood	6,894	48.4	−4.8
Labor gain from Country		Swing	+4.8	

=== Mackay ===
1969 Queensland state election: Mackay
Party	Candidate	Votes	%	±%
Labor	Ed Casey	5,501	58.7	−0.6
Liberal	Robert Gray	3,535	37.7	+37.7
Independent	Thomas McCanna	331	3.5	+3.5
Total formal votes		9,367	98.4	−0.2
Informal votes		154	1.6	+0.2
Turnout		9,521	90.4	−2.2
Two-party-preferred result
Labor	Ed Casey	5,667	60.5	−0.6
Liberal	Robert Gray	3,700	39.5	+39.5
Labor hold		Swing	−0.6	

=== Mackenzie ===
1969 Queensland state election: Mackenzie
Party	Candidate	Votes	%	±%
Country	Neville Hewitt	4,777	61.3	−38.7
Labor	Harold Kuhn	3,009	38.7	+38.7
Total formal votes		7,786	98.9	
Informal votes		89	1.1	
Turnout		7,875	90.1	
Country hold		Swing	−38.7	

=== Maryborough ===
1969 Queensland state election: Maryborough
Party	Candidate	Votes	%	±%
Labor	Horace Davies	6,374	56.5	−4.6
Liberal	Ralph Stafford	4,282	37.9	+37.9
Queensland Labor	Brian Hawes	636	5.6	−2.2
Total formal votes		11,292	98.9	+0.6
Informal votes		126	1.1	−0.6
Turnout		11,418	94.2	−0.6
Two-party-preferred result
Labor	Horace Davies	6,492	57.5	−6.9
Liberal	Ralph Stafford	4,800	42.5	+6.9
Labor hold		Swing	−6.9	

==== By-election ====
- This by-election was caused by the death of Horace Davies. It was held on 24 July 1971.

1971 Maryborough state by-election
Party	Candidate	Votes	%	±%
Labor	A.G.M. Zemek	4,197	39.4	−17.1
Liberal	Gilbert Alison	3,085	29.0	−8.9
Country	Ernest Jurss	2,943	27.6	+27.6
Independent	Barry Dau	303	2.9	+2.9
Queensland Labor	Matthews Minnegal	115	1.1	+1.1
Total formal votes		10,653	98.6	−0.3
Informal votes		154	1.4	+0.3
Turnout		10,807	89.7	−4.5
Two-party-preferred result
Liberal	Gilbert Alison	6,041	56.7	+14.2
Labor	A.G.M. Zemek	4,612	43.3	−14.2
Liberal gain from Labor		Swing	+14.2	

=== Merthyr ===
1969 Queensland state election: Merthyr
Party	Candidate	Votes	%	±%
Liberal	Sam Ramsden	4,508	49.9	−1.2
Labor	Brian Mellifont	3,651	40.4	+0.4
Queensland Labor	Maurice O'Connor	880	9.7	+0.8
Total formal votes		9,039	97.1	+0.1
Informal votes		268	2.9	−0.1
Turnout		9,307	87.3	−4.2
Two-party-preferred result
Liberal	Sam Ramsden	5,182	57.3	−0.2
Labor	Brian Mellifont	3,857	42.7	+0.2
Liberal hold		Swing	−0.2	

==== By-election ====
- This by-election was caused by the resignation of Sam Ramsden. It was held on 24 July 1971.

1971 Merthyr state by-election
Party	Candidate	Votes	%	±%
Liberal	Don Lane	4,026	53.1	+3.2
Labor	Brian Mellifont	2,672	35.3	−5.1
Queensland Labor	Peter Flanagan	882	11.6	+1.9
Total formal votes		7,580	97.6	+0.5
Informal votes		187	2.4	−0.5
Turnout		7,767	73.9	−13.4
Liberal hold		Swing	N/A	

- Preferences were not distributed.

=== Mirani ===
1969 Queensland state election: Mirani
Party	Candidate	Votes	%	±%
Country	Tom Newbery	4,352	54.5	+3.3
Labor	Gustav Creber	3,632	45.5	−0.8
Total formal votes		7,984	99.0	−0.1
Informal votes		81	1.0	+0.1
Turnout		8,065	92.8	−2.5
Country hold		Swing	+1.3	

=== Mount Coot-tha ===
1969 Queensland state election: Mount Coot-tha
Party	Candidate	Votes	%	±%
Liberal	Bill Lickiss	9,854	58.6	−1.4
Labor	Con Sciacca	4,976	29.6	−1.8
Queensland Labor	Andrew Aitken	1,972	11.7	+3.1
Total formal votes		16,802	98.5	−0.2
Informal votes		259	1.5	+0.2
Turnout		17,061	91.8	−1.9
Two-party-preferred result
Liberal	Bill Lickiss	11,514	68.5	+1.5
Labor	Con Sciacca	5,288	31.5	−1.5
Liberal hold		Swing	+1.5	

=== Mount Gravatt ===
1969 Queensland state election: Mount Gravatt
Party	Candidate	Votes	%	±%
Liberal	Geoff Chinchen	9,577	52.3	−3.6
Labor	James Kennedy	7,488	40.9	+5.6
Queensland Labor	Patrick O'Reilly	1,250	6.8	−1.9
Total formal votes		18,315	98.5	0.0
Informal votes		272	1.5	0.0
Turnout		18,587	93.9	−0.5
Two-party-preferred result
Liberal	Geoff Chinchen	10,595	57.8	−5.5
Labor	James Kennedy	7,720	42.2	+5.5
Liberal hold		Swing	−5.5	

=== Mourilyan ===
1969 Queensland state election: Mourilyan
Party	Candidate	Votes	%	±%
Labor	Peter Moore	4,451	53.3	−2.9
Country	Arnold Palmer	2,807	33.6	+2.1
Queensland Labor	Geoffrey Higham	1,100	13.2	+0.9
Total formal votes		8,358	97.4	−0.2
Informal votes		226	2.6	+0.2
Turnout		8,584	93.1	+0.3
Two-party-preferred result
Labor	Peter Moore	4,752	56.9	−1.6
Country	Arnold Palmer	3,606	43.1	+1.6
Labor hold		Swing	−1.6	

=== Mulgrave ===
1969 Queensland state election: Mulgrave
Party	Candidate	Votes	%	±%
Country	Roy Armstrong	3,926	59.8	+1.6
Labor	Leslie Trembath	2,640	40.2	−1.6
Total formal votes		6,566	98.2	−0.4
Informal votes		117	1.8	+0.4
Turnout		6,683	93.5	0.0
Country hold		Swing	+1.6	

=== Murrumba ===
1969 Queensland state election: Murrumba
Party	Candidate	Votes	%	±%
Country	David Nicholson	7,715	48.3	+7.0
Labor	Reginald O'Brien	7,115	44.5	+2.7
Queensland Labor	Robert Macklin	1,155	7.2	+5.0
Total formal votes		15,985	97.8	+0.3
Informal votes		365	2.2	−0.3
Turnout		16,350	93.6	−0.4
Two-party-preferred result
Country	David Nicholson	8,659	54.2	+0.2
Labor	Reginald O'Brien	7,326	45.8	−0.2
Country hold		Swing	+0.2	

=== Norman ===
1969 Queensland state election: Norman
Party	Candidate	Votes	%	±%
Labor	Fred Bromley	4,483	53.4	−3.2
Liberal	Ross Cameron	3,340	39.8	+5.4
Queensland Labor	Maurice Sheehan	577	6.9	−0.9
Total formal votes		8,400	97.5	−0.3
Informal votes		219	2.5	+0.3
Turnout		8,619	89.4	−2.9
Two-party-preferred result
Labor	Fred Bromley	4,590	54.6	−4.1
Liberal	Ross Cameron	3,810	45.4	+4.1
Labor hold		Swing	−4.1	

=== Nudgee ===
1969 Queensland state election: Nudgee
Party	Candidate	Votes	%	±%
Labor	Jack Melloy	8,771	61.6	−1.7
Liberal	Robert Harper	3,914	27.5	−7.2
Queensland Labor	David Mapstone	1,228	8.6	+8.6
Social Credit	Hubert Giesberts	335	2.3	+2.3
Total formal votes		14,248	98.1	−0.2
Informal votes		268	1.9	+0.2
Turnout		14,516	95.2	+0.3
Two-party-preferred result
Labor	Jack Melloy	9,111	63.9	−1.0
Liberal	Robert Harper	5,137	36.1	+1.0
Labor hold		Swing	−1.0	

=== Nundah ===
1969 Queensland state election: Nundah
Party	Candidate	Votes	%	±%
Liberal	William Knox	5,471	49.2	−2.5
Labor	Roderick Blundell	4,479	40.3	+0.4
Queensland Labor	Brian Barlow	1,178	10.6	+2.2
Total formal votes		11,128	98.4	−0.4
Informal votes		175	1.6	+0.4
Turnout		11,303	92.3	−0.8
Two-party-preferred result
Liberal	William Knox	6,322	56.8	−1.8
Labor	Roderick Blundell	4,806	43.2	+1.8
Liberal hold		Swing	−1.8	

=== Port Curtis ===
1969 Queensland state election: Port Curtis
Party	Candidate	Votes	%	±%
Labor	Martin Hanson	7,705	81.3	+11.3
Queensland Labor	Marguerita Glen	1,771	18.7	+18.7
Total formal votes		9,476	97.5	−1.8
Informal votes		244	2.5	+1.8
Turnout		9,720	91.2	−3.4
Labor hold		Swing	+9.8	

=== Redcliffe ===
1969 Queensland state election: Redcliffe
Party	Candidate	Votes	%	±%
Country	Jim Houghton	7,232	53.6	+8.5
Labor	Jack Trueman	5,313	39.4	+0.9
Queensland Labor	James Morrissey	952	7.0	+0.8
Total formal votes		13,497	98.6	+0.3
Informal votes		194	1.4	−0.3
Turnout		13,691	92.5	−0.5
Two-party-preferred result
Country	Jim Houghton	8,007	59.3	+0.6
Labor	Jack Trueman	5,490	40.7	−0.6
Country hold		Swing	+0.6	

=== Rockhampton North ===
1969 Queensland state election: Rockhampton North
Party	Candidate	Votes	%	±%
Labor	Merv Thackeray	8,763	65.8	+1.4
Liberal	Philip German	3,183	23.9	−3.1
Queensland Labor	John Dunn	1,380	10.4	+1.8
Total formal votes		13,326	98.7	−0.3
Informal votes		177	1.3	+0.3
Turnout		13,503	94.2	−1.6
Two-party-preferred result
Labor	Merv Thackeray	8,981	67.4	+0.7
Liberal	Philip German	4,345	32.6	−0.7
Labor hold		Swing	+0.7	

=== Rockhampton South ===
1969 Queensland state election: Rockhampton South
Party	Candidate	Votes	%	±%
Labor	Keith Wright	5,948	50.9	+11.8
Liberal	Rex Pilbeam	4,778	40.8	−8.0
Queensland Labor	Peter Boyle	971	8.3	−3.8
Total formal votes		11,697	98.7	−0.1
Informal votes		150	1.3	+0.1
Turnout		11,847	92.7	−2.0
Two-party-preferred result
Labor	Keith Wright	6,101	52.2	+8.9
Liberal	Rex Pilbeam	5,596	47.8	−8.9
Labor gain from Liberal		Swing	+8.9	

=== Roma ===
1969 Queensland state election: Roma
Party	Candidate	Votes	%	±%
Country	Ken Tomkins	4,613	56.5	−7.2
Labor	Marcus Thew	2,511	30.8	−5.5
Independent	Ronald Alford	1,037	12.7	+12.7
Total formal votes		8,161	99.1	0.0
Informal votes		73	0.9	0.0
Turnout		8,234	93.4	+0.5
Two-party-preferred result
Country	Ken Tomkins	5,235	64.1	+0.4
Labor	Marcus Thew	2,926	35.9	−0.4
Country hold		Swing	+0.4	

=== Salisbury ===
1969 Queensland state election: Salisbury
Party	Candidate	Votes	%	±%
Labor	Doug Sherrington	12,756	69.5	+0.2
Liberal	George Whyte	4,922	26.8	−3.9
Queensland Labor	Miroslav Jansky	679	3.7	+3.7
Total formal votes		18,357	98.0	+0.1
Informal votes		367	2.0	−0.1
Turnout		18,724	90.5	−1.9
Two-party-preferred result
Labor	Doug Sherrington	12,942	70.5	+1.2
Liberal	George Whyte	5,415	29.5	−1.2
Labor hold		Swing	+1.2	

=== Sandgate ===
1969 Queensland state election: Sandgate
Party	Candidate	Votes	%	±%
Labor	Harry Dean	7,431	63.2	+0.3
Liberal	Colin Clark	3,190	27.1	−4.1
Queensland Labor	Bernard Beston	1,146	9.7	+3.8
Total formal votes		11,767	98.3	+0.1
Informal votes		205	1.7	−0.1
Turnout		11,972	92.1	−0.3
Two-party-preferred result
Labor	Harry Dean	7,612	64.7	+0.7
Liberal	Colin Clark	4,155	35.3	−0.7
Labor hold		Swing	+0.7	

=== Sherwood ===
1969 Queensland state election: Sherwood
Party	Candidate	Votes	%	±%
Liberal	John Herbert	7,951	57.3	−9.3
Labor	Robert Wilson	4,855	35.0	+1.6
Queensland Labor	Clarice Weedon	1,072	7.7	+7.7
Total formal votes		13,878	98.1	−0.3
Informal votes		271	1.9	+0.3
Turnout		14,149	92.5	−0.9
Two-party-preferred result
Liberal	John Herbert	8,824	63.6	−3.0
Labor	Robert Wilson	5,054	36.4	+3.0
Liberal hold		Swing	−3.0	

=== Somerset ===
1969 Queensland state election: Somerset
Party	Candidate	Votes	%	±%
Country	Harold Richter	5,014	59.9	0.0
Labor	Norman Cush	3,351	40.1	+7.7
Total formal votes		8,365	98.8	−0.1
Informal votes		101	1.2	+0.1
Turnout		8,466	94.8	0.0
Country hold		Swing	−5.0	

=== South Brisbane ===
1969 Queensland state election: South Brisbane
Party	Candidate	Votes	%	±%
Labor	Col Bennett	5,193	59.2	+1.0
Liberal	Alan Brown	2,621	29.9	−0.9
Queensland Labor	John O'Connell	757	8.6	+0.2
Socialist	Victor Slater	199	2.3	+2.3
Total formal votes		8,770	97.0	+0.1
Informal votes		273	3.0	−0.1
Turnout		9,043	84.4	−3.8
Two-party-preferred result
Labor	Col Bennett	5,493	62.3	+0.4
Liberal	Alan Brown	3,277	37.7	−0.4
Labor hold		Swing	+0.4	

=== South Coast ===
1969 Queensland state election: South Coast
Party	Candidate	Votes	%	±%
Country	Russ Hinze	6,071	40.2	+9.7
Liberal	Bruce Bishop	4,883	32.4	−5.5
Labor	Frank Culell	3,309	21.9	+1.0
Queensland Labor	Laurence Kehoe	553	3.7	+0.2
Independent	Dino Bertoldo	164	1.1	+1.1
Independent	John Lee	104	0.7	+0.7
Total formal votes		15,084	96.3	−1.8
Informal votes		577	3.7	+1.8
Turnout		15,661	85.4	−3.9
Two-candidate-preferred result
Country	Russ Hinze	9,407	62.4	+9.9
Liberal	Bruce Bishop	5,677	37.6	−9.9
Country hold		Swing	+9.9	

=== Tablelands ===
1969 Queensland state election: Tablelands
Party	Candidate	Votes	%	±%
Labor	Edwin Wallis-Smith	3,759	52.4	−3.2
Country	Micheli Borzi	3,410	47.6	+5.3
Total formal votes		7,169	97.7	0.0
Informal votes		166	2.3	0.0
Turnout		7,335	89.1	+1.4
Labor hold		Swing	−3.6	

=== Toowong ===
1969 Queensland state election: Toowong
Party	Candidate	Votes	%	±%
Liberal	Charles Porter	6,566	59.1	−6.2
Labor	Ian Hinckfuss	3,417	30.8	+5.4
Queensland Labor	Brian O'Brien	1,117	10.1	+0.8
Total formal votes		11,100	98.5	+0.1
Informal votes		174	1.5	−0.1
Turnout		11,274	89.0	−3.8
Two-party-preferred result
Liberal	Charles Porter	7,475	67.3	−5.8
Labor	Ian Hinckfuss	3,625	32.7	+5.8
Liberal hold		Swing	−5.8	

=== Toowoomba East ===
1969 Queensland state election: Toowoomba East
Party	Candidate	Votes	%	±%
Labor	Peter Wood	7,993	53.4	+1.5
Liberal	Sydney Goodrick	6,012	40.2	+24.4
Queensland Labor	Francis Mullins	954	6.4	+0.9
Total formal votes		14,959	98.8	+0.4
Informal votes		182	1.2	−0.4
Turnout		15,141	92.5	−2.3
Two-party-preferred result
Labor	Peter Wood	8,170	54.6	−0.7
Liberal	Sydney Goodrick	6,789	45.4	+45.4
Labor hold		Swing	−0.7	

=== Toowoomba West ===
1969 Queensland state election: Toowoomba West
Party	Candidate	Votes	%	±%
Labor	Ray Bousen	7,489	48.0	−13.8
Country	John Peel	4,191	26.8	+26.8
Liberal	Leigh Wallman	2,563	16.4	−12.5
Queensland Labor	John Davis	1,371	8.8	−0.5
Total formal votes		15,614	98.7	−0.1
Informal votes		209	1.3	+0.1
Turnout		15,823	93.1	−2.4
Two-party-preferred result
Labor	Ray Bousen	7,896	50.6	−12.9
Country	John Peel	7,718	49.4	+49.4
Labor hold		Swing	−12.9	

=== Townsville North ===
1969 Queensland state election: Townsville North
Party	Candidate	Votes	%	±%
Labor	Perc Tucker	6,977	47.6	−2.6
Liberal	Keith Rundle	3,695	25.2	−10.8
Country	Owen Griffiths	2,488	17.0	+17.0
Queensland Labor	Peter Flanagan	1,495	10.2	−3.7
Total formal votes		14,655	98.6	−0.3
Informal votes		208	1.4	+0.3
Turnout		14,863	88.3	−3.5
Two-party-preferred result
Labor	Perc Tucker	7,436	50.7	−2.0
Liberal	Keith Rundle	7,219	49.3	+2.0
Labor hold		Swing	−2.0	

=== Townsville South ===
1969 Queensland state election: Townsville South
Party	Candidate	Votes	%	±%
Independent	Tom Aikens	8,085	53.1	−10.1
Labor	Leslie Moon	5,281	34.7	−0.8
Queensland Labor	Bryan Hurney	1,653	10.9	+10.9
Communist	Francis Bishop	206	1.3	0.0
Total formal votes		15,225	98.5	−0.2
Informal votes		224	1.5	+0.2
Turnout		15,449	90.7	−3.0
Two-candidate-preferred result
Independent	Tom Aikens	9,013	59.2	−4.7
Labor	Leslie Moon	6,212	40.8	+4.7
Independent hold		Swing	−4.7	

=== Warrego ===
1969 Queensland state election: Warrego
Party	Candidate	Votes	%	±%
Labor	Jack Aiken	3,020	45.0	−55.0
Country	Robert Anson	2,628	39.1	+39.1
Independent	Jack Tonkin	1,066	15.9	+15.9
Total formal votes		6,714	99.3	
Informal votes		49	0.7	
Turnout		6,763	84.4	
Two-party-preferred result
Labor	Jack Aiken	3,656	54.5	−45.5
Country	Robert Anson	3,058	45.5	+45.5
Labor hold		Swing	−45.5	

=== Warwick ===
1969 Queensland state election: Warwick
Party	Candidate	Votes	%	±%
Country	David Cory	4,276	53.8	−5.1
Labor	Raymond Lyons	3,014	38.0	+5.0
Queensland Labor	Daniel Skehan	650	8.2	+0.1
Total formal votes		7,940	99.1	+0.2
Informal votes		70	0.9	−0.2
Turnout		8,010	95.4	−0.5
Two-party-preferred result
Country	David Cory	4,805	60.5	−5.0
Labor	Raymond Lyons	3,135	39.5	+5.0
Country hold		Swing	−5.0	

=== Wavell ===
1969 Queensland state election: Wavell
Party	Candidate	Votes	%	±%
Labor	Herbert Bromley	5,562	37.5	−3.7
Liberal	Arthur Crawford	4,360	29.4	−21.0
Independent	Alex Dewar	3,765	25.4	+25.4
Queensland Labor	Rogers Judge	1,158	7.8	+0.5
Total formal votes		14,845	99.0	+0.5
Informal votes		154	1.0	−0.5
Turnout		14,999	94.0	−0.8
Two-party-preferred result
Liberal	Arthur Crawford	8,131	54.8	−2.1
Labor	Herbert Bromley	6,714	45.2	+2.1
Liberal hold		Swing	−2.1	

=== Whitsunday ===
1969 Queensland state election: Whitsunday
Party	Candidate	Votes	%	±%
Country	Ron Camm	5,254	55.3	+4.1
Labor	Elwyn Uprichard	3,848	40.5	−2.8
Queensland Labor	Bernard Lewis	401	4.2	−1.3
Total formal votes		9,503	98.4	+0.1
Informal votes		154	1.6	−0.1
Turnout		9,657	92.4	−0.4
Two-party-preferred result
Country	Ron Camm	5,580	58.7	+3.0
Labor	Elwyn Uprichard	3,923	41.3	−3.0
Country hold		Swing	+3.0	

=== Windsor ===
1969 Queensland state election: Windsor
Party	Candidate	Votes	%	±%
Labor	Keith Fordyce	4,607	45.6	+1.7
Liberal	Bob Moore	4,294	42.5	−6.3
Queensland Labor	John Dawson	1,198	11.9	+3.7
Total formal votes		10,099	98.6	0.0
Informal votes		138	1.4	0.0
Turnout		10,237	91.9	−1.9
Two-party-preferred result
Liberal	Bob Moore	5,196	51.5	−4.6
Labor	Keith Fordyce	4,903	48.5	+4.6
Liberal hold		Swing	−4.6	

=== Wynnum ===
1969 Queensland state election: Wynnum
Party	Candidate	Votes	%	±%
Labor	Ted Harris	8,076	60.5	+5.8
Liberal	Noel Justo	4,222	31.6	−6.7
Queensland Labor	Gordon Randall	777	5.8	+0.4
Communist	R.A. Annear	270	2.0	+0.4
Total formal votes		13,345	98.2	0.0
Informal votes		241	1.8	0.0
Turnout		13,586	91.8	−2.3
Two-party-preferred result
Labor	Ted Harris	8,437	63.2	+6.2
Liberal	Noel Justo	4,908	36.8	−6.2
Labor hold		Swing	+6.2	

=== Yeronga ===
1969 Queensland state election: Yeronga
Party	Candidate	Votes	%	±%
Liberal	Norm Lee	5,311	49.5	−1.5
Labor	Malcolm Campbell	4,261	39.7	+0.9
Queensland Labor	Jonyth Mapstone	1,149	10.7	+0.4
Total formal votes		10,721	98.5	+0.1
Informal votes		159	1.5	−0.1
Turnout		10,880	93.1	−1.6
Two-party-preferred result
Liberal	Norm Lee	6,280	58.6	−0.7
Labor	Malcolm Campbell	4,441	41.4	+0.7
Liberal hold		Swing	−0.7	

== See also ==
- 1969 Queensland state election
- Members of the Queensland Legislative Assembly, 1969-1972
