= Electoral results for the district of Isis =

Queensland, Australia, district election results

This is a list of electoral results for the electoral district of Isis in Queensland state elections.

== Members for Isis ==
Member	Party	Term
William Brand	CPNP	1932-1936
William Brand	Country	1936-1950
Jack Pizzey	Country	1950-1968
Jim Blake	Labor	1968-1974
Lin Powell	National	1974-1989
Lin Powell	Independent	1989
Bill Nunn	Labor	1989-1992

== Election results ==
=== Elections in the 1980s ===
1989 Queensland state election: Isis
Party	Candidate	Votes	%	±%
Labor	Bill Nunn	10,174	44.43	+6.02
National	Bob Kerr	4,850	21.18	−31.50
Independent	Lin Powell	4,117	17.98	+17.98
Liberal	Fred Kleinschmidt	3,758	16.41	+16.41
Total formal votes		22,899	97.65	−0.50
Informal votes		550	2.35	+0.50
Turnout		23,449	92.07	+0.07
Two-party-preferred result
Labor	Bill Nunn	11,467	50.08	+7.48
National	Bob Kerr	11,432	49.92	−7.48
Labor gain from National		Swing	+7.48	

1986 Queensland state election: Isis
Party	Candidate	Votes	%	±%
National	Lin Powell	9,289	52.7	−5.0
Labor	Bill Nunn	6,772	38.4	−3.9
Independent	William Elson-Green	873	4.9	+4.9
Independent	Camillo Primavera	426	2.4	+2.4
Independent	Kevin Hendstock	273	1.5	+1.5
Total formal votes		17,633	98.1	
Informal votes		333	1.9	
Turnout		17,966	92.0	
Two-party-preferred result
National	Lin Powell	10,121	57.4	−0.3
Labor	Bill Nunn	7,512	42.6	+0.3
National hold		Swing	−0.3	

1983 Queensland state election: Isis
Party	Candidate	Votes	%	±%
National	Lin Powell	10,193	57.1	+7.0
Labor	Joseph Endres	7,665	42.9	+6.7
Total formal votes		17,858	98.7	0.0
Informal votes		239	1.3	0.0
Turnout		18,097	92.5	+2.3
National hold		Swing	−1.6	

1980 Queensland state election: Isis
Party	Candidate	Votes	%	±%
National	Lin Powell	7,569	50.1	+1.7
Labor	Michael Edgar	5,466	36.2	−1.1
Liberal	David Cooper	1,231	8.1	−3.6
Democrats	Ronald Cullen	535	3.5	+3.5
Democrats	Mervyn Worth	302	2.0	+2.0
Total formal votes		15,103	98.7	−0.2
Informal votes		201	1.3	+0.2
Turnout		15,304	90.2	−2.0
Two-party-preferred result
National	Lin Powell	8,871	58.7	−0.5
Labor	Michael Edgar	6,232	41.3	+0.5
National hold		Swing	−0.5	

=== Elections in the 1970s ===
1977 Queensland state election: Isis
Party	Candidate	Votes	%	±%
National	Lin Powell	6,435	48.4	+15.0
Labor	Phillip Barnsley	4,947	37.3	−7.7
Liberal	Mary Spurway	1,554	11.7	−9.9
Independent	James Dobson	346	2.6	+2.6
Total formal votes		13,282	98.9	
Informal votes		150	1.1	
Turnout		13,432	92.2	
Two-party-preferred result
National	Lin Powell	7,861	59.2	+5.8
Labor	Phillip Barnsley	5,421	40.8	−5.8
National hold		Swing	+5.8	

1974 Queensland state election: Isis
Party	Candidate	Votes	%	±%
Labor	Jim Blake	6,994	45.0	−10.3
National	Lin Powell	5,190	33.4	+6.5
National	Barry Wright	3,360	21.6	+21.6
Total formal votes		15,544	99.0	0.0
Informal votes		153	1.0	0.0
Turnout		15,697	91.7	−2.4
Two-party-preferred result
National	Lin Powell	8,411	54.1	+12.4
Labor	Jim Blake	7,133	45.9	−12.4
National gain from Labor		Swing	+12.4	

1972 Queensland state election: Isis
Party	Candidate	Votes	%	±%
Labor	Jim Blake	7,062	55.3	+1.2
Country	Alfred Plath	3,441	26.9	−17.0
Liberal	Kenneth Murphy	1,777	13.9	+13.9
Independent	Eric Andrew	491	3.8	+3.8
Total formal votes		12,771	99.0	
Informal votes		124	1.0	
Turnout		12,895	94.1	
Two-party-preferred result
Labor	Jim Blake	7,448	58.3	+1.7
Country	Alfred Plath	5,323	41.7	−1.7
Labor hold		Swing	+1.7	

=== Elections in the 1960s ===
1969 Queensland state election: Isis
Party	Candidate	Votes	%	±%
Labor	Jim Blake	5,013	54.1	+18.8
Country	Harold Bonanno	4,073	43.9	−13.8
Queensland Labor	Matthews Minnegal	184	2.0	−5.0
Total formal votes		9,270	99.0	+0.8
Informal votes		96	1.0	−0.8
Turnout		9,366	96.0	+1.4
Two-party-preferred result
Labor	Jim Blake	5,057	54.4	+17.2
Country	Harold Bonnano	4,223	45.6	−17.2
Labor gain from Country		Swing	+17.2	

1966 Queensland state election: Isis
Party	Candidate	Votes	%	±%
Country	Jack Pizzey	5,111	57.7	0.0
Labor	George Hooper	3,131	35.3	+0.7
Queensland Labor	Brian Hawes	617	7.0	+4.2
Total formal votes		8,859	98.2	+0.1
Informal votes		163	1.8	−0.1
Turnout		9,022	94.6	+0.6
Two-party-preferred result
Country	Jack Pizzey	5,561	62.8	+0.6
Labor	George Hooper	3,298	37.2	−0.6
Country hold		Swing	+0.6	

1963 Queensland state election: Isis
Party	Candidate	Votes	%	±%
Country	Jack Pizzey	5,092	57.7	−42.3
Labor	George Hooper	3,053	34.6	+34.6
Social Credit	Arnold Jones	432	4.9	+4.9
Queensland Labor	Tom Carroll	248	2.8	+2.8
Total formal votes		8,825	98.1	
Informal votes		175	1.9	
Turnout		9,000	94.0	
Two-party-preferred result
Country	Jack Pizzey	5,488	62.2	−37.8
Labor	George Hooper	3,337	37.8	+37.8
Country hold		Swing	−37.8	

1960 Queensland state election: Isis
Party	Candidate	Votes	%	±%
Country	Jack Pizzey	unopposed		
Country hold		Swing	N/A	

=== Elections in the 1950s ===
1957 Queensland state election: Isis
Party	Candidate	Votes	%	±%
Country	Jack Pizzey	6,230	68.0	+5.7
Queensland Labor	Edward McDonnell	2,935	32.0	+32.0
Total formal votes		9,165	96.6	−2.0
Informal votes		324	3.4	+2.0
Turnout		9,489	96.1	+2.8
Country hold		Swing	+5.7	

1956 Queensland state election: Isis
Party	Candidate	Votes	%	±%
Country	Jack Pizzey	5,753	62.3	+3.6
Labor	Hylton Salter	3,475	37.7	−3.6
Total formal votes		9,228	98.6	−0.1
Informal votes		131	1.4	+0.1
Turnout		9,359	93.3	−1.3
Country hold		Swing	+3.6	

1953 Queensland state election: Isis
Party	Candidate	Votes	%	±%
Country	Jack Pizzey	5,326	58.7	−3.2
Labor	John Barron	3,743	41.3	+3.2
Total formal votes		9,069	98.7	+1.6
Informal votes		123	1.3	−1.6
Turnout		9,192	94.6	−0.4
Country hold		Swing	−3.2	

1950 Queensland state election: Isis
Party	Candidate	Votes	%	±%
Country	Jack Pizzey	5,539	61.9	
Labor	Frank Eastaughffe	3,412	38.1	
Total formal votes		8,951	97.1	
Informal votes		269	2.9	
Turnout		9,220	95.0	
Country hold		Swing		

=== Elections in the 1940s ===
1947 Queensland state election: Isis
Party	Candidate	Votes	%	±%
Country	William Brand	5,239	68.3	+3.8
Labor	Samuel Round	2,426	31.7	−3.8
Total formal votes		7,665	96.9	+0.9
Informal votes		241	3.1	−0.9
Turnout		7,906	95.6	+2.8
Country hold		Swing	+3.8	

1944 Queensland state election: Isis
Party	Candidate	Votes	%	±%
Country	William Brand	4,901	64.5	+5.4
Labor	Frank Eastaughffe	2,694	35.5	−5.4
Total formal votes		7,595	96.0	−1.8
Informal votes		318	4.0	+1.8
Turnout		7,913	92.8	−2.7
Country hold		Swing	+5.4	

1941 Queensland state election: Isis
Party	Candidate	Votes	%	±%
Country	William Brand	4,979	59.1	−5.6
Labor	William Ivey	3,439	40.9	+5.6
Total formal votes		8,418	97.8	−0.8
Informal votes		190	2.2	+0.8
Turnout		8,608	95.5	+0.8
Country hold		Swing	−5.6	

=== Elections in the 1930s ===
1938 Queensland state election: Isis
Party	Candidate	Votes	%	±%
Country	William Brand	5,247	64.7	+6.6
Labor	Ernest Widdup	2,857	35.3	−6.6
Total formal votes		8,104	98.6	+0.1
Informal votes		113	1.4	−0.1
Turnout		8,217	94.7	−0.3
Country hold		Swing	+6.6	

1935 Queensland state election: Isis
Party	Candidate	Votes	%	±%
CPNP	William Brand	4,817	58.1	
Labor	Dudley Ryder	3,472	41.9	
Total formal votes		8,289	98.5	
Informal votes		123	1.5	
Turnout		8,412	95.0	
CPNP hold		Swing		

1932 Queensland state election: Isis
Party	Candidate	Votes	%	±%
CPNP	William Brand	3,868	56.2	
Labor	Albert Jones	2,569	37.3	
Queensland Party	John Murray	442	6.4	
Total formal votes		6,879	99.0	
Informal votes		71	1.0	
Turnout		6,950	95.7	
CPNP hold		Swing		

- Preferences were not distributed.
