= Electoral results for the district of Mackenzie =

Queensland state electoral result

This is a list of electoral results for the electoral district of Mackenzie in Queensland state elections.

== Members for Mackenzie ==
Member	Party	Term
Paddy Whyte	Labor	1950–1956
Neville Hewitt	Country	1956–1972

== Election results ==
=== Elections in the 1960s ===
1969 Queensland state election: Mackenzie
Party	Candidate	Votes	%	±%
Country	Neville Hewitt	4,777	61.3	−38.7
Labor	Harold Kuhn	3,009	38.7	+38.7
Total formal votes		7,786	98.9	
Informal votes		89	1.1	
Turnout		7,875	90.1	
Country hold		Swing	−38.7	

1966 Queensland state election: Mackenzie
Party	Candidate	Votes	%	±%
Country	Neville Hewitt	unopposed		
Country hold		Swing		

1963 Queensland state election: Mackenzie
Party	Candidate	Votes	%	±%
Country	Nev Hewitt	4,305	62.7	−2.1
Labor	Patrick O'Brien	2,555	37.3	+2.1
Total formal votes		6,860	98.7	−0.1
Informal votes		87	1.3	+0.1
Turnout		6,947	94.6	+1.7
Country hold		Swing	−2.1	

1960 Queensland state election: Mackenzie
Party	Candidate	Votes	%	±%
Country	Nev Hewitt	4,329	64.8	
Labor	Charles White	2,348	35.2	
Total formal votes		6,677	98.8	
Informal votes		83	1.2	
Turnout		6,760	92.9	
Country hold		Swing		

=== Elections in the 1950s ===
1957 Queensland state election: Mackenzie
Party	Candidate	Votes	%	±%
Country	Nev Hewitt	2,523	55.1	+4.6
Labor	William James	1,140	24.9	−24.6
Queensland Labor	John Thomas Cook	920	20.1	+20.1
Total formal votes		4,583	99.2	+0.1
Informal votes		35	0.8	−0.1
Turnout		4,618	93.5	+4.0
Country hold		Swing	+18.4	

1956 Queensland state election: Mackenzie
Party	Candidate	Votes	%	±%
Country	Nev Hewitt	2,172	50.5	+5.5
Labor	Paddy Whyte	2,126	49.5	−5.5
Total formal votes		4,298	99.1	−0.1
Informal votes		41	0.9	+0.1
Turnout		4,339	89.5	−0.6
Country gain from Labor		Swing	+5.5	

1953 Queensland state election: Mackenzie
Party	Candidate	Votes	%	±%
Labor	Paddy Whyte	2,420	55.0	+3.7
Country	James Lawrence	1,978	45.0	−3.7
Total formal votes		4,398	99.2	+0.5
Informal votes		36	0.8	−0.5
Turnout		4,434	90.1	+1.1
Labor hold		Swing	+3.7	

1950 Queensland state election: Mackenzie
Party	Candidate	Votes	%	±%
Labor	Paddy Whyte	2,184	51.3	
Country	William Holmes	2,076	48.7	
Total formal votes		4,260	98.7	
Informal votes		54	1.3	
Turnout		4,314	89.0	
Labor hold		Swing		
