= 1969 Queensland state election =

← 1966	17 May 1969	1972 →

All 78 seats in the Legislative Assembly of Queensland 40 Assembly seats were needed for a majority
- Turnout: 91.77 (▼1.50 pp)
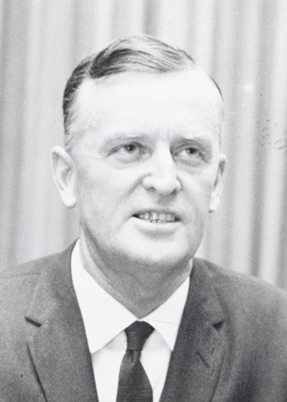

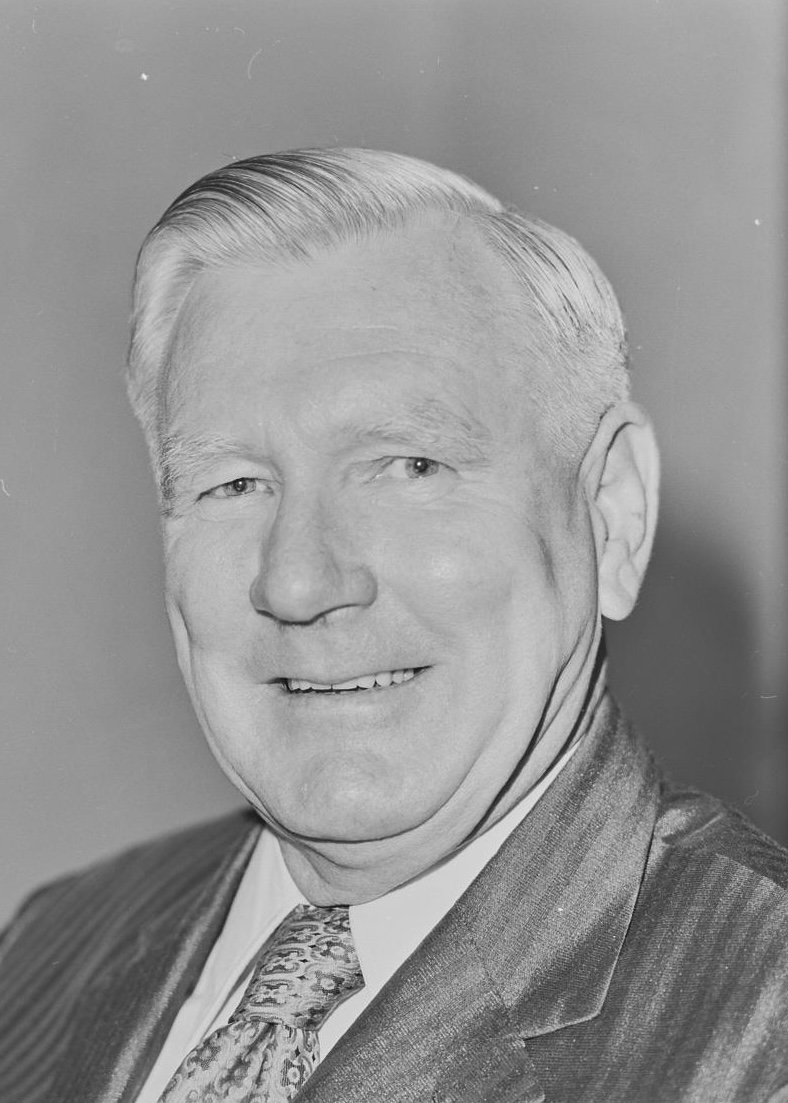
	First party	Second party	Third party
			QLP
Leader	Joh Bjelke-Petersen	Jack Houston	No leader
Party	Country–Liberal Coalition	Labor	Queensland Labor
Leader since	8 August 1968	12 October 1966
Leader's seat	Barambah	Bulimba
Last election	47 seats, 44.77%	26 seats, 43.84%	1 seat, 6.25%
Seats won	45	31	1
Seat change	▼2	▲5	Steady
Popular vote	380,890	383,388	61,661
Percentage	44.70%	44.99%	7.24%
Swing	▼0.08	▲1.15	▲0.99
- Winning margin by electorate.
Premier before election
Joh Bjelke-Petersen
Country–Liberal Coalition
Elected Premier
Joh Bjelke-Petersen
Country–Liberal Coalition

Elections were held in the Australian state of Queensland on 17 May 1969 to elect the 78 members of the Legislative Assembly of Queensland.

The Country–Liberal Coalition won its fifth consecutive victory since it won government in 1957. It was also the Coalition's first victory under new leader Joh Bjelke-Petersen after the brief premierships of Gordon Chalk and Jack Pizzey, who in turn had succeeded Frank Nicklin when he had retired the previous year.

The election campaign was characterised by tension between the governing coalition partners.

== Key dates ==
Date	Event
8 April 1969	The Legislative Assembly was dissolved and writs were issued.
17 April 1969	Close of nominations.
17 May 1969	Polling day, between the hours of 8am and 6pm.
29 May 1969	The Bjelke-Petersen Ministry was reconstituted.
21 June 1969	The writ was returned and the results formally declared.
30 June 1969	Deadline for return of the writs.
5 August 1969	Parliament resumed for business.

== Candidates ==
By the close of nominations on 17 April, 247 candidates had nominated—two more than at the 1966 election. The Courier-Mail reported the following split of candidates by party:

Party	Candidates
ALP	77
DLP	61
Liberal	44
Country	39
Social Credit	3
Communist	2
NQP (Aikens)	1
Independent	20

Six of the 78 seats—Albert, Bundaberg, Cairns, South Coast, Toowoomba West and Townsville North—had three-cornered contests between the Labor, Liberal and Country parties.

== Results ==
The election resulted in another win for the Coalition, but a strengthening of the Country Party's position vis-a-vis the Liberal Party. Labor gained back two seats held by ex-Labor ministers who had defected in the 1957 split when both retired, and gained one seat off each of the coalition partners; however, the Country party gained the seat of Burdekin following the conservative independent incumbent's retirement. Labor retained Isis, which it had gained unexpectedly at a November 1968 by-election from the Country Party following Premier Jack Pizzey's death.

Queensland state election, 17 May 1969 Legislative Assembly << 1966–1972 >>
Enrolled voters	945,583				
Votes cast	867,743		Turnout	91.77%	–1.50%
Informal votes	15,566		Informal	1.79%	+0.16%
Summary of votes by party
Party	Primary votes	%	Swing	Seats	Change
Labor	383,388	44.99%	+1.15%	31	+4
Liberal	201,765	23.68%	–1.81%	19	–1
Country	179,125	21.02%	+1.73%	26	±0
Queensland Labor	61,661	7.24%	+0.99%	1	±0
Social Credit	1,295	0.15%	+0.15%	0	±0
Communist	476	0.06%	+0.06%	0	±0
Independent	22,497	2.64%	–2.12%	1	–3
Total	852,177			78	

Popular vote
Labor	44.99%
Liberal	23.68%
Country	21.02%
Democratic Labor	7.24%
Independents	2.85%

Seats
Labor	39.74%
Country	33.33%
Liberal	24.36%
Democratic Labor	1.28%
Independents	1.28%

== Seats changing hands ==
Seat	Pre-1969			Swing	Post-1969		
Seat	Party	Member	Margin	Swing	Margin	Member	Party
Bundaberg	Independent	Ted Walsh	3.5 v ALP	N/A	8.1 v CP	Lou Jensen	Labor
Burdekin	Independent	Arthur Coburn	8.5 v LIB	N/A	4.2 v ALP	Val Bird	Country
Cook	Independent	Bunny Adair	5.2 v ALP	N/A	6.1 v CP	Bill Wood	Labor
Logan	Country	Dick Wood	3.2	–4.8	1.6	Ted Baldwin	Labor
Rockhampton South	Liberal	Rex Pilbeam	6.7	–8.9	2.2	Keith Wright	Labor

- Members listed in italics did not recontest their seats.
- In addition, Labor retained the seat of Isis, which it had won from the Country party at the 1968 by-election.

== Post-election pendulum ==
Country/Liberal seats (45)
Marginal
Hawthorne	Bill Kaus	LIB	0.02%
Bowen	Peter Delamothe	LIB	1.4%
Windsor	Bob Moore	LIB	1.5%
Ashgrove	Douglas Tooth	LIB	2.8%
Burdekin	Val Bird	CP	4.2%
Murrumba	David Nicholson	CP	4.2%
Mirani	Tom Newbery	CP	4.5%
Wavell	Arthur Crawford	LIB	4.8%
Kurilpa	Clive Hughes	LIB	4.9%
Flinders	Bill Longeran	CP	5.1%
Aspley	Fred Campbell	LIB	5.5%
Fairly safe
Callide	Vincent Jones	CP	6.8%
Ithaca	Col Miller	LIB	6.8%
Nundah	William Knox	LIB	6.8%
Merthyr	Ray Ramsden	LIB	7.3%
Mount Gravatt	Geoff Chinchen	LIB	7.8%
Yeronga	Norm Lee	LIB	8.6%
Chatsworth	Bill Hewitt	LIB	8.7%
Whitsunday	Ron Camm	CP	8.7%
Balonne	Harold Hungerford	CP	8.9%
Redcliffe	Jim Houghton	CP	9.3%
Mulgrave	Roy Armstrong	CP	9.8%
Somerset	Harold Richter	CP	9.9%
Safe
Clayfield	John Murray	LIB	10.3%
Warwick	David Cory	CP	10.5%
Mackenzie	Neville Hewitt	CP	11.3%
South Coast	Russ Hinze	CP	12.4% v LIB
Greenslopes	Keith Hooper	LIB	12.6%
Gregory	Wally Rae	CP	12.7%
Fassifern	Selwyn Muller	CP	13.4%
Sherwood	John Herbert	LIB	13.6%
Roma	Ken Tomkins	CP	14.1%
Carnarvon	Henry McKechnie	CP	14.4%
Hinchinbrook	John Row	CP	14.9%
Gympie	Max Hodges	CP	15.3%
Burnett	Claude Wharton	CP	15.9%
Toowong	Charles Porter	LIB	17.3%
Cooroora	David Low	CP	17.6%
Mount Coot-tha	Bill Lickiss	LIB	18.5%
Landsborough	Mike Ahern	CP	18.7%
Cunningham	Alan Fletcher	CP	19.2%
Very safe
Lockyer	Gordon Chalk	LIB	20.7% v IND
Albert	Cec Carey	CP	25.2%
Condamine	Vic Sullivan	CP	25.2%
Barambah	Joh Bjelke-Petersen	CP	28.2%

Labor seats (31)
Marginal
Toowoomba West	Ray Bousen	ALP	0.6%
Townsville North	Perc Tucker	ALP	0.7%
Logan	Ted Baldwin	ALP	1.6%
Rockhampton South	Keith Wright	ALP	2.2%
Tablelands	Edwin Wallis-Smith	ALP	2.4%
Isis	Jim Blake	ALP	4.4%
Warrego	Jack Aiken	ALP	4.5%
Norman	Fred Bromley	ALP	4.6%
Toowoomba East	Peter Wood	ALP	4.6%
Fairly safe
Cook	Bill Wood	ALP	6.1%
Ipswich West	Vi Jordan	ALP	6.3%
Mourilyan	Peter Moore	ALP	6.9%
Maryborough	Horace Davies	ALP	7.5%
Bundaberg	Lou Jensen	ALP	8.1%
Barcoo	Eugene O'Donnell	ALP	8.4%
Belmont	Fred Newton	ALP	8.8%
Brisbane	Brian Davis	ALP	8.8%
Ipswich East	Evan Marginson	ALP	9.5%
Safe
Mackay	Ed Casey	ALP	10.5%
Kedron	Eric Lloyd	ALP	11.6%
South Brisbane	Col Bennett	ALP	12.3%
Burke	Alex Inch	ALP	13.0%
Wynnum	Edward Harris	ALP	13.2%
Nudgee	Jack Melloy	ALP	13.9%
Sandgate	Harold Dean	ALP	14.7%
Cairns	Ray Jones	ALP	15.5%
Baroona	Pat Hanlon	ALP	15.7%
Rockhampton North	Merv Thackeray	ALP	17.4%
Bulimba	Jack Houston	ALP	17.8%
Very safe
Salisbury	Doug Sherrington	ALP	20.5%
Port Curtis	Martin Hanson	ALP	31.3% v DLP
Crossbench seats (2)
Townsville South	Tom Aikens	IND	9.2% v ALP
Aubigny	Les Diplock	DLP	13.2% v CP

== See also ==
- Members of the Queensland Legislative Assembly, 1966–1969
- Members of the Queensland Legislative Assembly, 1969–1972
- Bjelke-Petersen Ministry
