= List of mayors of Bundaberg =

Mayor of Bundaberg
- Incumbent; Helen Blackburn since 16 March 2024
- Inaugural holder: E. B. Jeune
- Formation: 1880

This is a list of mayors of the Bundaberg Region (2008–present) and City of Bundaberg in Queensland, Australia, and its predecessors.

Bundaberg was originally established as a Municipality on 22 April 1881, on land previously managed by the Barolin Divisional Board. With the passage of the Local Authorities Act 1902, Bundaberg became a Town on 31 March 1903, and on 22 November 1913, it was accorded City status.

== Barolin Divisional Board ==
- E. B. Jeune (1880)

== Municipality of Bundaberg ==
- Richard Ruddell (1881)
- Walter Adams (1882, 1883)
- Capt. William Edward Curtis (1884)
- Andrew M. Goodwin (1885)
- Michael Duffy (1886)
- Daniel McConville (1887)
- Michael Duffy (1888)
- John Rowland (1888, 1889)
- Andrew M. Goodwin (1890)
- James C. Walker (1891)
- John Rowland (1892)
- Capt. William Edward Curtis (1893)
- Daniel McConville (1894, 1895)
- John F. Boreham (1896)
- Patrick Duffy (1897)
- Andrew Dunne (1898)
- Robert Totten (1899)
- Frederick Colman (1900)
- Gustav Steindl (1901)
- Richard Ruddell (1902)

== Town of Bundaberg ==
- William F. Marshall (1903)
- John Wyper (1904)
- Robert McMannie (1905)
- Michael Duffy (1906)
- Albert E. Avenell (1907)
- Richard Ruddell (1908)
- John Redmond (1909)
- Peter Neilson (1910)
- Alexander Stevenson (1911)
- Lewis Holden Maynard (1912)
- William Dunn (1913)

== City of Bundaberg ==
- William Dunn (1913)
- Rev. Father J. Mimnagh (1914)
- Elwyn Thomas Steptoe (1915, 1916)
- Richard Ruddell (1917)
- William Dunn (1918)
- Martin Dunn (1919)
- William Gavegan (1920–1923)
- Richard G. Curtis (1924)
- William S. P. Gavegan (1925, 1926) (Nationalist)
- Bernard McLean (1927–1936) (Labor)
- Frederick Harold Buss (1936–1958)
- Clifford John Nielsen (1958–1984)
- Allan Stewart (1984–1988)
- Jeff Boreham (1988–1991)
- Nita Cunningham (1991–1998)
- Kay McDuff (1998–2008)

== Bundaberg Region ==
- Lorraine Pyefinch (2008–2013)
- Mal Forman (2013–2016)
- Jack Dempsey (2016–2024)
- Helen Blackburn (2024 - )
