= George Philip Barber =

Australian politician

George Barber
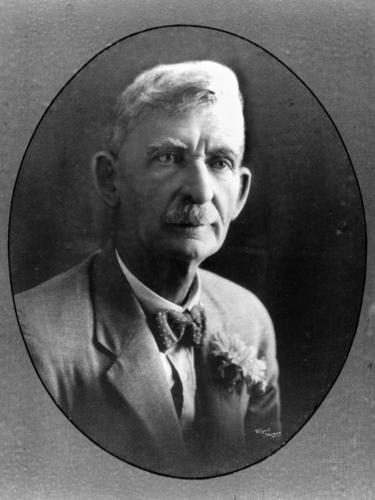

Member of the Queensland Legislative Assembly for Bundaberg
- In office 6 July 1901 – 10 May 1935
- Preceded by: Thomas Glassey
- Succeeded by: Bernard McLean

Personal details
- Born: George Philip Barber; 26 March 1863 Lowestoft, Suffolk, England
- Died: 7 November 1938 (aged 75) Brisbane, Queensland, Australia
- Party: Labor
- Spouse: Mary Nichols (m.1891 d.1939)
- Occupation: Labourer

George Philip Barber (26 March 1863 – 7 November 1938) was a member of the Queensland Legislative Assembly. To the people of Bundaberg, he was known as "Honest George".

== Biography ==
Barber was born in Oulton Broad, a suburb of Lowestoft in Suffolk, the son of George Barber Snr and his wife Susan (née Gall). He was educated in the local parish and board schools and by 1875 was working as a seaman in the Dogger Bank fishing fleet before engaging in missionary work in India.

After arriving in Queensland Barber took up banana farming and was a handyman at the local meatworks and labourer at a sawmill. He was also a Petty Officer in the Royal Australian Naval Reserve for the duration of World War I.

In 1891 Barber married Mary Nichols (died 1939) in Melbourne and together had two sons and two daughters. He died in Brisbane in November 1938 and was cremated at Mt Thompson Crematorium.

== Public career ==
Following the resignation of Thomas Glassey to join the Australian Senate, Barber, a member of the Labour Party, won the resulting by-election in 1901 for the seat of Bundaberg in the Queensland Legislative Assembly. He defeated Michael Duffy, who had represented the seat from 1893 to 1896.

Barber went on to represent the seat for 34 years, retiring at the 1935 state election. By the time of his retirement he was the Father of the House. For a period during his parliamentary career, Barber was Secretary of the Queensland Parliamentary Labor Party.

Parliament of Queensland
Preceded by Thomas Glassey	Member for Bundaberg; 1901–1935	Succeeded by Bernard McLean
