= Clem Campbell =

Australian politician

Clem Campbell OAM

Queensland President of the United Nations Association of Australia
- In office 2013–Current

Member of the Queensland Legislative Assembly for Bundaberg
- In office 22 October 1983 – 13 June 1998
- Preceded by: Jim Blake
- Succeeded by: Nita Cunningham

Personal details
- Born: Clement Bernard Campbell; 16 August 1948 (age 78) Brisbane, Queensland, Australia
- Party: Labor Party of Australia
- Education: Griffith University
- Occupation: State President of United Nations Association of Australia (QLD)
- Profession: Academic; Former State MP
- Website: http://www.unaaqld.org.au

Clement Bernard (Clem) Campbell OAM (born 16 August 1948) is a former Australian state politician and was a member of the Parliament of Queensland from 1983 to 1998.

Campbell obtained a Bachelor of Agricultural degree and later worked as a Research and Regional Economist with the Queensland Department of Primary Industries. He was elected to the Legislative Assembly of Queensland for Bundaberg at the 1983 election, representing the Labor Party, and held the seat until the 1998 election. He served as a member of various Parliamentary Committees during the term of the Wayne Goss Labor government.

After Campbell's retirement from Parliament he joined the staff of Griffith University in Brisbane.

As of 2008, Campbell is the founding chairman of Green Cross Australia and current chair of Earth Charter Australia. He is also a director with Football Queensland.

In 2013, Clem Campbell became the United Nations Association of Australia Queensland President.

In 2014, Mr Campbell was awarded the Order of Australia Medal for his contribution to the community as an outstanding advocate for peace and environmental education and leadership in promoting ethics in public life.

Parliament of Queensland
Preceded by Jim Blake	Member for Bundaberg; 1983–1998	Succeeded by Nita Cunningham
