= Lin Powell =

Australian politician

The Hon Lin Powell

Speaker of the Queensland Parliament
- In office 2 December 1987 – 5 July 1989
- Preceded by: Kev Lingard
- Succeeded by: Kev Lingard
- Constituency: Isis

Member of the Queensland Legislative Assembly for Isis
- In office 7 December 1974 – 31 July 1989
- Preceded by: Jim Blake
- Succeeded by: Bill Nunn

Personal details
- Born: Lionel William Powell; 10 March 1939 (age 87) Maryborough, Queensland
- Party: National Party
- Other political affiliations: Independent
- Occupation: Schoolteacher

Lionel William "Lin" Powell (born 10 March 1939) is a former Australian politician. He was a Member of the Queensland Legislative Assembly for Isis.

== Early life ==
Powell was born in Maryborough to Lionel Mitchell Powell and Helen Irene, née West. Lin Powell is a great-grandson of Native Police officer Walter David Taylor Powell. He was educated at state schools in Bundaberg and then at Brisbane State High School. After studying at Kelvin Grove Teachers College and the University of Queensland, he became a schoolteacher. He taught at Stafford, Cairns and Bundaberg and was a school principal at Lyndhurst, Cooloolabin, Forest Station and Cattle Creek Valley.

== Politics ==
A long-time member of the National Party, he was secretary of the Mundubbera branch from 1965 until his election as president in 1967, serving until 1970. In 1974, he was elected to the Queensland Legislative Assembly as the member for Isis. Promoted to the front bench as Minister for Education in 1982, he was briefly Leader of Government Business in the House in 1987 before being elected Speaker in December, immediately after Joh Bjelke-Petersen's ousting by Mike Ahern.

On 3 May 1989, Powell resigned from the National Party and declared himself an independent. He continued as Speaker until 5 July 1989, when the government voted against him on a matter of privilege; his resignation prompted scenes of chaos in the chamber. He remained a Member of Parliament until his sudden resignation on 31 July 1989; he was urged to form a new Conservative Party but declined. He ran for Isis as an independent at the 1989 election, but without success.

Political offices
Preceded by Claude Wharton	Leader of the House of the Legislative Assembly of Queensland; 1987	Succeeded by Brian Austin
Parliament of Queensland
Preceded by Kev Lingard	Speaker of the Legislative Assembly; 1987–1989	Succeeded by Kev Lingard
Preceded by Jim Blake	Member for Isis; 1974–1989	Succeeded by Bill Nunn
