= Bill Nunn (politician) =

Australian politician (born 1932)

Member of the Queensland Legislative Assembly for Hervey Bay Isis (1989–1992)
- In office 2 December 1989 – 13 June 1998
- Preceded by: Lin Powell
- Succeeded by: David Dalgleish

Personal details
- Born: William George Nunn; 27 February 1932 (age 94) Maryborough, Queensland
- Party: Labor
- Occupation: Business manager

William George Nunn (born 27 February 1932) is a former Australian politician. He was a Member of the Queensland Legislative Assembly.

== Early life ==
Nunn was born during the Great Depression in Maryborough, the son of Robert Nunn whose ancestors arrived in Maryborough on the ship Great Queensland in 1874. His mother Eileen Marie Murphy was descended from Irish settlers. He worked as a business manager.

== Politics ==
Nunn served as a Hervey Bay Councillor from 1987 to 1990.

In 1989, Nunn moved to state politics and was elected to the Queensland Legislative Assembly as the Labor member for Isis. After Isis was abolished before the 1992 election Nunn transferred to the new seat of Hervey Bay. Nunn served as a backbencher until his defeat in 1998 by One Nation candidate, David Dalgleish.

Parliament of Queensland
Preceded by Lin Powell	Member for Isis; 1989–1992	Abolished
New seat	Member for Hervey Bay; 1992–1998	Succeeded by David Dalgleish
