= Paddy Whyte =

Australian politician

Member of the Queensland Legislative Assembly for Mackenzie
- In office 29 Apr 1950 – 19 May 1956
- Preceded by: New seat
- Succeeded by: Neville Hewitt

Personal details
- Born: Patrick James Whyte; 14 October 1894 Mount Morgan, Queensland, Australia
- Died: 16 October 1977 (aged 83) Brisbane, Queensland, Australia
- Resting place: Nudgee Cemetery
- Party: Labor
- Spouse: Alice May Donnelly (m.1932 d.1965)
- Occupation: Engine driver

Patrick James "Paddy" Whyte (14 October 1894 – 16 October 1977) was a member of the Queensland Legislative Assembly.

== Biography ==
Whyte was born in Mount Morgan, Queensland, the son of Andrew Patrick Whyte and his wife Mary (née O'Sullivan). He was educated at Mount Perry State School and Mount Morgan Convent School and by 1920 he was an engine driver, working out of Emerald. Later he was an employee at the Queensland Institute of Technology.

On 14 May 1932 he married Alice May Donnelly (died 1965) and together had one son (Patrick who died in May 1967) and one daughter Kath. Whyte died in Brisbane in 1977 and was buried in the Nudgee Cemetery.

== Public career ==
Whyte entered state politics as the member for the new seat of Mackenzie at the 1950 Queensland state election He held it for six years before being defeated by the Country Party's Neville Hewitt in 1956. He was also a councilor on the Emerald Shire Council.

Parliament of Queensland
New seat	Member for Mackenzie; 1950–1956	Succeeded by Neville Hewitt
