= George Joseph Hall =

Australian politician

George Hall
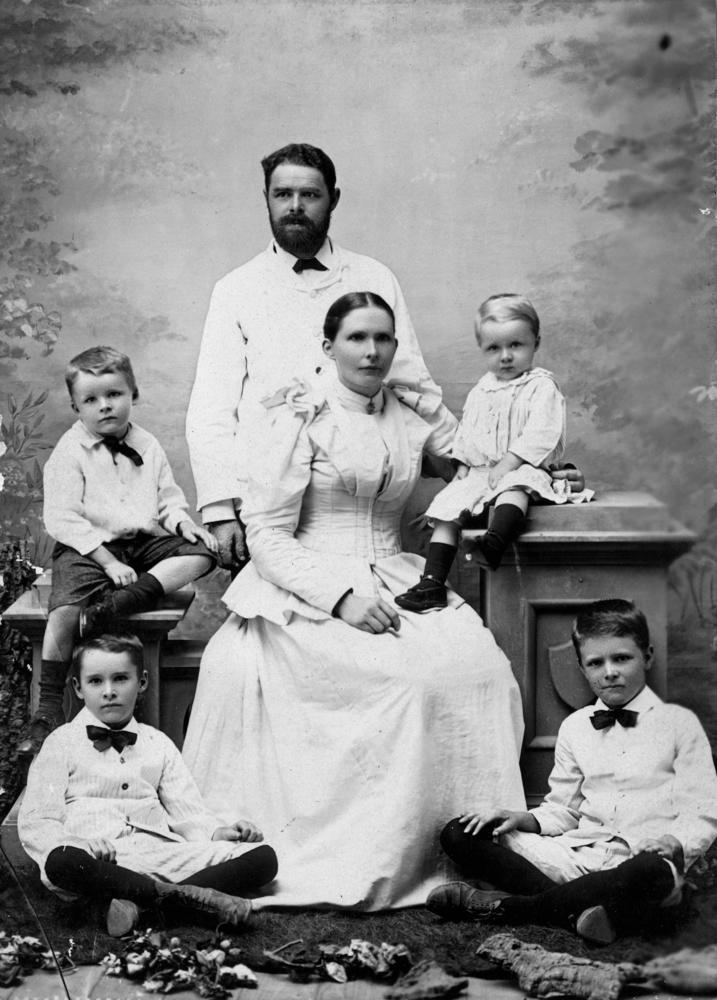
- George Hall and family - 1895

Member of the Queensland Legislative Assembly for Bundaberg
- In office 16 Jun 1892 – 6 May 1893
- Preceded by: Walter Adams
- Succeeded by: Michael Duffy

Personal details
- Born: George Joseph Hall; 27 January 1857 Theddlethorpe, Lincolnshire, England
- Died: 21 November 1924 (aged 67) London, England
- Party: Labour Party
- Spouse: Anna Gertrude Mason (m.1882)
- Occupation: Carpenter

George Joseph Hall (27 January 1857 – 21 November 1924) was a member of the Queensland Legislative Assembly.

== Biography ==
Hall was born in Theddlethorpe, Lincolnshire, the son of George Hall Snr and was educated at the Theddlethorpe National School. In 1870 he became apprenticed to his father as a carpenter before working as a millwright in Hull. He arrived in Bundaberg on the Renfrewshire in 1882, and spent a short time in Melbourne before returning to Bundaberg. In 1887, after suffering a serious accident, Hall became a building draughtsman. He returned to England in 1897 where he worked as a pattern-maker in London.

On 30 May 1882 Hall married Anna Gertrude Mason in Grimsby and together had four sons and a daughter. He died in London in November 1924.

== Public career ==
Hall was an early member of the Labor movement and was a secretary of the Bundaberg Workers Political Organization. He was also treasurer of the General Labor Union.

When Walter Adams, the member for Bundaberg in the Queensland Legislative Assembly died in 1892, Hall won the resultant by-election. He held the seat for less than a year, losing it at the 1893 Queensland colonial election to the Ministerial candidate, Michael Duffy.

Parliament of Queensland
Preceded by Walter Adams	Member for Bundaberg; 1892–1893	Succeeded by Michael Duffy
