= Tom Smith (Queensland politician) =

Australian politician

Tom Smith MP

Member of the Queensland Legislative Assembly for Bundaberg
- Incumbent
- Assumed office 31 October 2020
- Preceded by: David Batt

Personal details
- Born: 2 September 1990 (age 35)
- Party: Labor

Thomas John Smith (born 2 September 1990) is an Australian politician. He is currently serving as the Labor Party member for Bundaberg in the Queensland Legislative Assembly, first being elected by a 9-vote margin at the 2020 state election. Despite being the most marginal seat in the state, Smith managed to retain Bundaberg at the 2024 state election with a 1.4% swing in his favour, even as the LNP won majority government and all but wiped Labor out in regional Queensland.

Before his election, Smith was a secondary school teacher.

Parliament of Queensland
Preceded by David Batt	Member for Bundaberg; 2020–present	Incumbent
