= Lou Jensen =

Australian politician

Member of the Queensland Legislative Assembly for Bundaberg
- In office 17 May 1969 – 12 November 1977
- Preceded by: Ted Walsh
- Succeeded by: Jim Blake

Personal details
- Born: Eugene Dubois Jensen; 13 February 1915 Port Darwin, Northern Territory, Australia
- Died: 1 July 2003 (aged 119) Bundaberg, Queensland, Australia
- Party: Independent
- Other political affiliations: Labor
- Spouse: Olive Margaret Magee (m.1941)
- Education: Brisbane Technical College
- Occupation: Sugar Chemist

Eugene Dubois "Lou" Jensen (13 February 1915 – 1 July 2003) was a member of the Queensland Legislative Assembly.

== Biography ==
Jensen was born in Port Darwin, Northern Territory, the son Harold Ingemann and his wife Jane Elizabeth Ellen (née England). He was named after the Dutch paleoanthropologist, Eugène Dubois. He soon moved to Brisbane where he was educated at Nundah State School and Brisbane Grammar School before attending the Brisbane Technical College where he earned a Diploma of Sugar Chemistry. He worked as a sugar chemist at various sugar mills in Queensland and during World War II, Jensen worked as a chemist at munitions factories in Maribyrnong and St Marys.

On 30 May 1941 he married Olive Margaret Magee and together had two daughters. Jensen died in Bundaberg in July 2003.

== Political career ==
When the Independent member for Bundaberg, Ted Walsh, retired at the 1969 Queensland state election, Jensen, a member of the Labor Party, won the seat. He held Bundaberg until the 1977 state election when he was defeated by Jim Blake.

For the last few weeks of his political career he sat as an independent. This was due to the Labor Party increasing its members' levy from two per cent to 3.5 per cent in order to increase funds. Jensen raised the matter in the House and as a result was subsequently disendorsed by the party for the 1977 election in favour of Blake. He once wore a red T-shirt into parliament with "I'm a Labor rebel man" written on it to win a $50 bet with a friend. He was the Shadow Minister for Lands, Forestry and Water Resources during 1975–1976.

Parliament of Queensland
Preceded by Ted Walsh	Member for Bundaberg; 1969–1977	Succeeded by Jim Blake
