= Walter Adams (politician) =

Australian politician

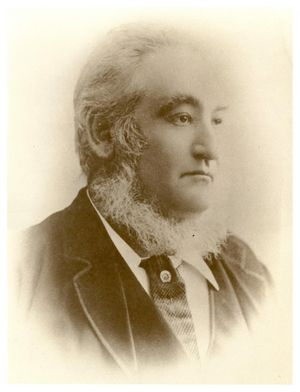

Member of the Queensland Legislative Assembly for Mulgrave
- In office 10 July 1886 – 5 May 1888
- Preceded by: Thomas McIlwraith
- Succeeded by: Seat abolished

Member of the Queensland Legislative Assembly for Bundaberg
- In office 5 May 1888 – 15 May 1892
- Preceded by: New seat
- Succeeded by: George Hall

Personal details
- Born: Walter Adams; 22 November 1830 Yeovil, Somersetshire, England
- Died: 15 May 1892 (aged 61) Sydney, Australia
- Resting place: Catholic Cemetery, Fitzgerald Street, Bundaberg
- Spouse: Mary Shannon (m.1854)
- Occupation: Blacksmith, Grazier, Publican

Walter Adams (22 November 1830 – 15 May 1892) was a politician in Queensland, Australia. He was a Member of the Queensland Legislative Assembly.

== Early life ==
Walter Adams was born on 22 November 1830 in Yeovil, Somersetshire, England. He was educated at a private school at Somerton nearby. He arrived in Sydney, New South Wales in September 1849, where he worked as a blacksmith with his brothers Edward and James. Adam moved to Wide Bay in Queensland in 1853 where he resided in Maryborough and continued to work as a blacksmith. While in Maryborough, he established a machinery business a contracting business. He also owned a sugar cane farm in the Somerville area.

== Politics ==
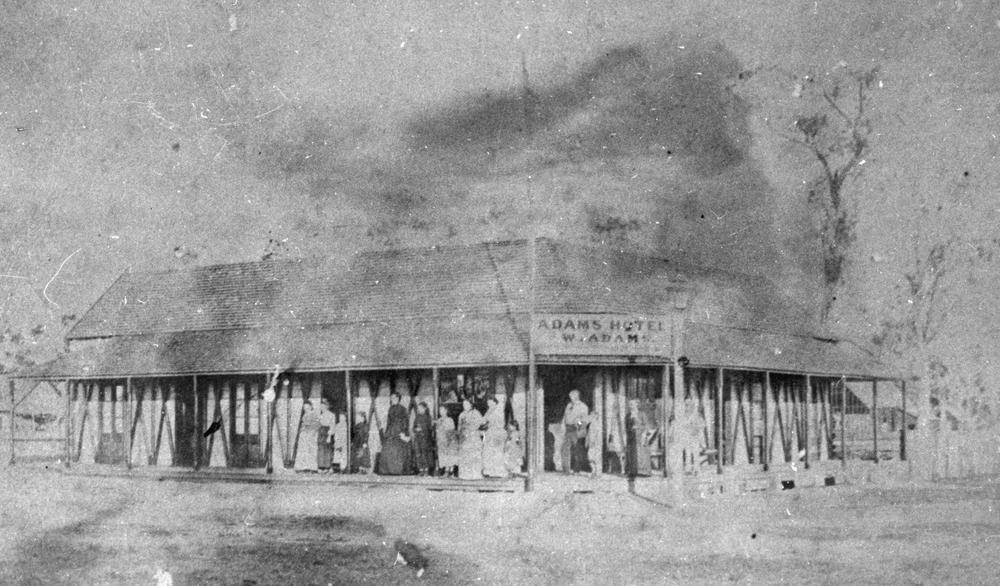
Adams Hotel, on the south-east corner of Burbong and Barolin Streets, Bundaberg

While living in Maryborough, Adams served as an alderman in the Maryborough Town Council and was chairman of its Works Committee.

In 1872, Adams left Maryborough and moved to Bundaberg, where he purchased the sugar cane farm, Somerville Plantation, at Barolin. In about 1874 he built and operated the Adams Hotel on the south-east corner of Burbong and Barolin Streets. He also contracted to build roads, bridges and telegraph lines. Adams quickly became involved in local affairs, serving as president of the School of Arts for 5 years and also as a member of the Hospital Committee. He was also active in establishing the first primary school. He was a founder and president of the Hibernian Society in Bundaberg. He was the president of the Agricultural and Pastoral Society in Bundaberg.

When the Borough of Bundaberg was established for local government in 1881, Adams was one of the first aldermen elected and served twice as its mayor in 1882 and 1883.

On 5 June 1886, Thomas McIlwraith, the then Member of the Queensland Legislative Assembly for the electoral district of Mulgrave, resigned. Walter Adams won the resulting by-election on 10 July 1886. He held the seat until 5 May 1888 (the 1888 colonial election).

The Electoral Districts Act of 1887 abolished the seat of Mulgrave, but effectively replaced it with the seat of electoral district of Bundaberg. Adams successfully contested Bundaberg in the 1888 state election and held that seat until his death on 15 May 1892. Labour candidate George Hall won the resulting by-election on 16 June 1892.

== Death ==
On 4 May 1892, Adams went to Sydney because he had a cancerous tumour on his lip and neck. He underwent a 2-hour operation on Thursday 12 May at Prince Alfred Hospital which was expected to be successful. However, he died in the hospital on Sunday 15 May 1892. His body was brought to Bundaberg by train and buried in the Bundaberg Catholic cemetery on the afternoon of 21 May. Despite torrential rain, the funeral procession to the cemetery comprised hundreds of people and was nearly a mile long; all businesses were closed for the afternoon.

== Legacy ==
Walter Adams was a generous man and made many donations, including the land on which Shalom Catholic College was established. Adams House at the College is named after him with the house crest bearing the words "Adams" and "Generosity".

== See also ==
- Members of the Queensland Legislative Assembly, 1883–1888; 1888–1893

Parliament of Queensland
Preceded by Thomas McIlwraith	Member for Mulgrave; 1886–1888	Abolished
New seat	Member for Bundaberg; 1888–1892	Succeeded by George Hall
