= Michael Duffy (Queensland politician) =

Australian politician

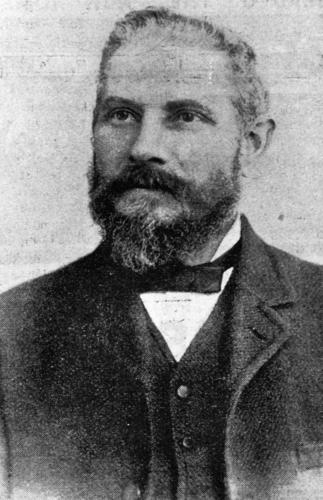

Member of the Queensland Legislative Assembly for Bundaberg
- In office 6 May 1893 – 21 March 1896
- Preceded by: George Hall
- Succeeded by: Thomas Glassey

Personal details
- Born: Michael Duffy; 1848 or 1849 Westmeath, Ireland
- Died: 4 February 1926 (aged 77) Mosman, New South Wales, Australia
- Resting place: Church of England Cemetery, Northern Suburbs
- Party: Ministerial
- Spouse: Bertha Grossman (m.1876 d.1929)
- Occupation: Bushworker

Michael Duffy (1848 or 1849 - 4 February 1926) was a member of the Queensland Legislative Assembly.

== Biography ==
Duffy was born in Westmeath, Ireland, the son of John Duffy and arrived in Queensland in 1865. He was a general bushworker in western Queensland before settling in Bundaberg in 1873 where he first worked as a storekeeper. He leased a wharf in 1878 and from 1880-1888 was an Australia Steam navigation agent and later on was a partner in a sugar company. He retired to Sydney in 1908.

On 28 August 1876 Duffy married Bertha Grossman (died 1929) and together had three sons and six daughters. He died in Mosman, Sydney in February 1926 and his funeral proceeded from his Mosman residence to the Church of England Cemetery, Northern Suburbs.

== Public career ==
Duffy was a member of the Bundaberg Divisional Board, later the Municipality of Bundaberg and was Mayor of Bundaberg in 1886, 1888, and 1906. He was also a member of the Bundaberg Chamber of Commerce, the Bundaberg Hospital Board, and the Bundaberg Fire Brigade.

At the 1893 Queensland election, representing the Ministerialists, Duffy won the seat of Bundaberg in the Queensland Legislative Assembly. He held it for one term, losing to Labour's Thomas Glassey in 1896.

Parliament of Queensland
Preceded by George Hall	Member for Bundaberg; 1893–1896	Succeeded by Thomas Glassey
