= Electoral district of Isis =

Former electoral district of Queensland, Australia

Isis Queensland—Legislative Assembly
- State: Queensland
- Created: 1932
- Abolished: 1992
- Namesake: Isis River

Isis was an electoral district of the Legislative Assembly in the Australian state of Queensland, from 1932 until 1992. It was named after the Shire of Isis in the Wide Bay–Burnett region.

Isis was created in the 1931 redistribution under the Moore government, replacing the former district of Burrum. It primarily comprised the area between Bundaberg and Maryborough, not including the cities themselves.

Isis was primarily a safe seat for the Country party. Premier Jack Pizzey was the member for Isis from 1950 until his sudden death in 1968. The seat was then won by Labor in the resulting by-election.

Isis was abolished in the 1991 redistribution under the Goss government, being replaced by the new district of Hervey Bay.

== Members for Isis ==
Member	Party	Term
William Brand	CPNP	1932–1936
William Brand	Country	1936–1950
Jack Pizzey	Country	1950–1968
Jim Blake	Labor	1968–1974
Lin Powell	National	1974–1989
Lin Powell	Independent	1989
Bill Nunn	Labor	1989–1992

== See also ==
- Electoral districts of Queensland
- Members of the Queensland Legislative Assembly by year
- Category:Members of the Queensland Legislative Assembly by name
