= Electoral district of Mackenzie =

Former state electoral district of Queensland, Australia

Electoral district of Mackenzie Queensland—Legislative Assembly
- State: Queensland
- Created: 1950
- Abolished: 1972
- Namesake: Mackenzie River
- Demographic: Western Rural
- Coordinates: 23°05′S 148°40′E

The electoral district of Mackenzie was a Legislative Assembly electorate in the Australian state of Queensland. It was first created in a redistribution ahead of the 1950 state election, and existed until the 1972 state election.

Mackenzie incorporated some of the former district of Normanby.

== Members for Mackenzie ==
The members for Mackenzie were:

Member	Party	Term
Paddy Whyte	Labor	1950–1956
Neville Hewitt	Country	1956–1972

== See also ==
- Electoral districts of Queensland
- Members of the Queensland Legislative Assembly by year
- Category:Members of the Queensland Legislative Assembly by name
