= Nev Hewitt =

Australian politician

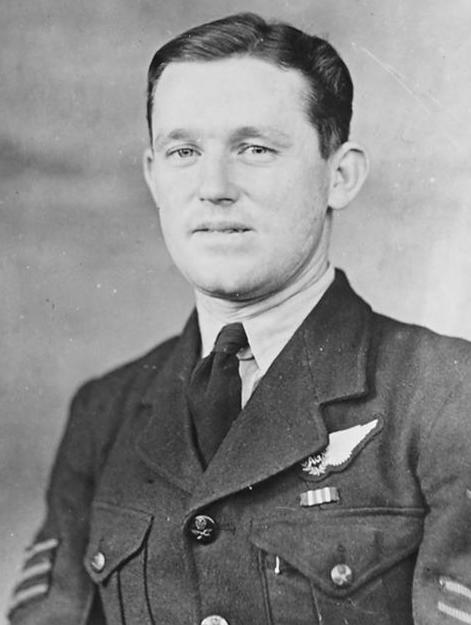
- Hewitt in 1943

Member of the Queensland Legislative Assembly for Mackenzie
- In office 19 May 1956 – 27 May 1972
- Preceded by: Paddy Whyte
- Succeeded by: Seat abolished

Member of the Queensland Legislative Assembly for Auburn
- In office 27 May 1972 – 29 November 1980
- Preceded by: New seat
- Succeeded by: Neville Harper

Personal details
- Born: Neville Thomas Eric Hewitt; 19 October 1920 Theodore, Queensland, Australia
- Died: 19 July 2016 (aged 95) Rockhampton, Queensland, Australia
- Party: Country Party/National Party
- Spouse: Nancy Dorris Freeman (m.1946)
- Occupation: Grazier

Neville Thomas Eric "Nev" Hewitt (19 October 1920 – 19 July 2016) was an Australian politician. He was a Member of the Queensland Legislative Assembly.

== Early life ==
Hewitt was born at Theodore, Queensland in 1920 to Herbert Deane Hewitt and his wife Mildred Sarah Elizabeth (née Davey). He started his schooling in Theodore before completing his education at Rockhampton Grammar School.

== World War II ==
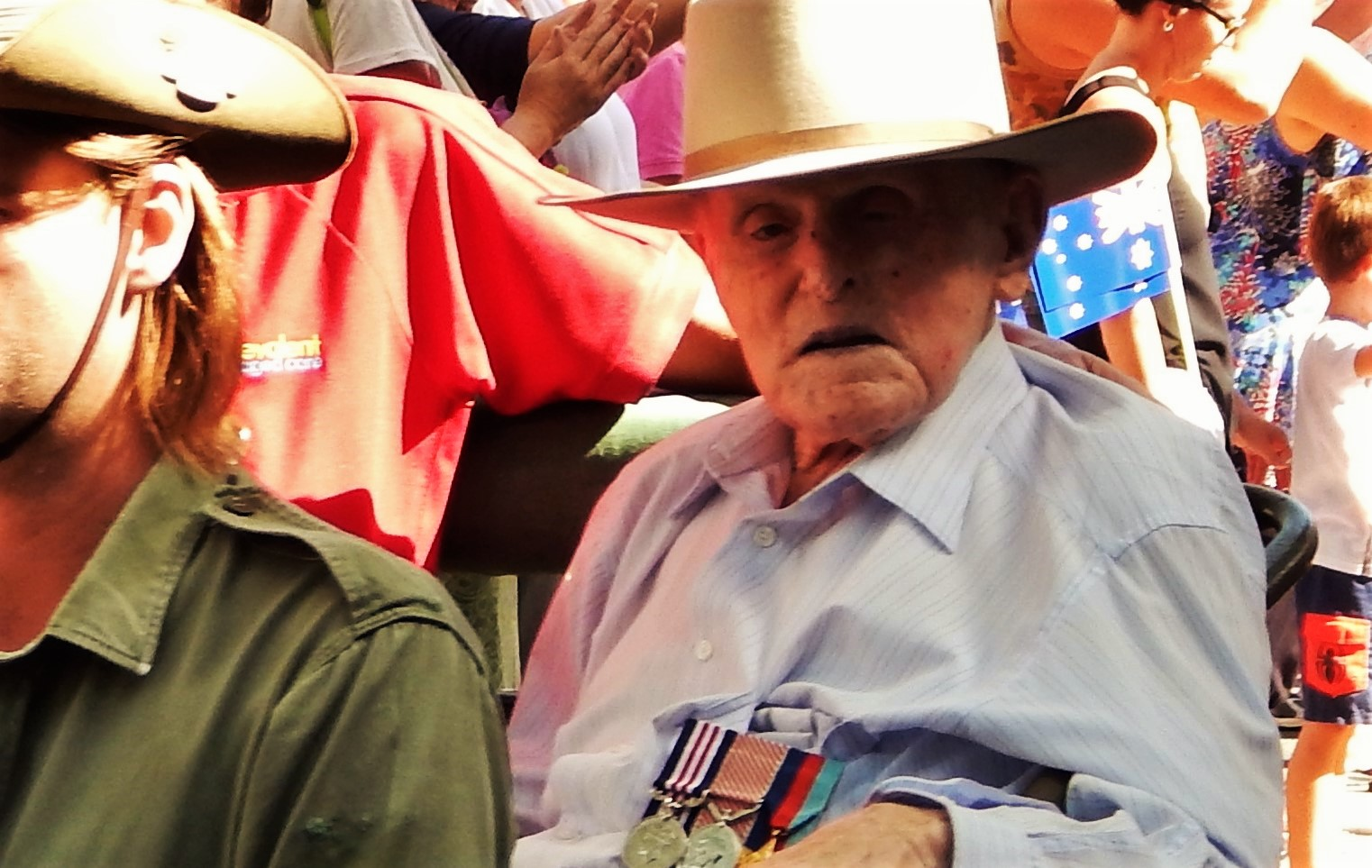
Neville Hewitt in Rockhampton's Anzac Day parade, 2016

In World War II, he joined the Royal Australian Air Force, reaching the rank of Flying Officer. Hewitt was aboard a Wellington Bomber when it was shot down over Tunisia. He managed to parachute out and endured an artillery duel before landing and breaking his ankle. Over four nights he managed to crawl back to where his plane had crashed and destroyed anything of value to the enemy. He was finally rescued by a British patrol and for his actions was awarded the Military Medal and the Air Force Medal.

After the war, he returned to Theodore and worked at Forest Hills Station till 1948. Hewitt then worked as manager for Australian Estates in Eidsvold till 1956 at which time he entered Queensland politics.

== Politics ==
At the 1956 Queensland election Hewitt won the seat of Mackenzie as a candidate for the Country Party. It was the only seat his party gained from the Labor Party, winning it by just 46 votes after a second count. At the 1972 election his seat was abolished and he moved to the electorate of Auburn, holding it till his retirement from politics in 1980. From 1969 till 1980 Hewitt held several Ministerial roles including Water Resources, Aboriginal and Islander Advancement, and Local Government. During his 12 years as a Minister 10 major dams were built, the Brigalow Land Development Scheme was introduced, and the Moura and Blackwater mining developments commenced.

== Personal life ==
In 1946, he married Nancy Dorris Freeman and they have five children -Geoffery, Denise, Ian, Peter and Rodney. Fifteen grandchildren Kate, Lachlan, Nathan, Cameron, Anna, Rebecca, Thomas, Jessica, Kimberley, Callan, James, Bethany, Hamish, Charles and Fletcher. In his younger days Hewitt was an amateur jockey and rode 300 winners. Hewitt died on 19 July 2016 in Rockhampton.

== Legacy ==
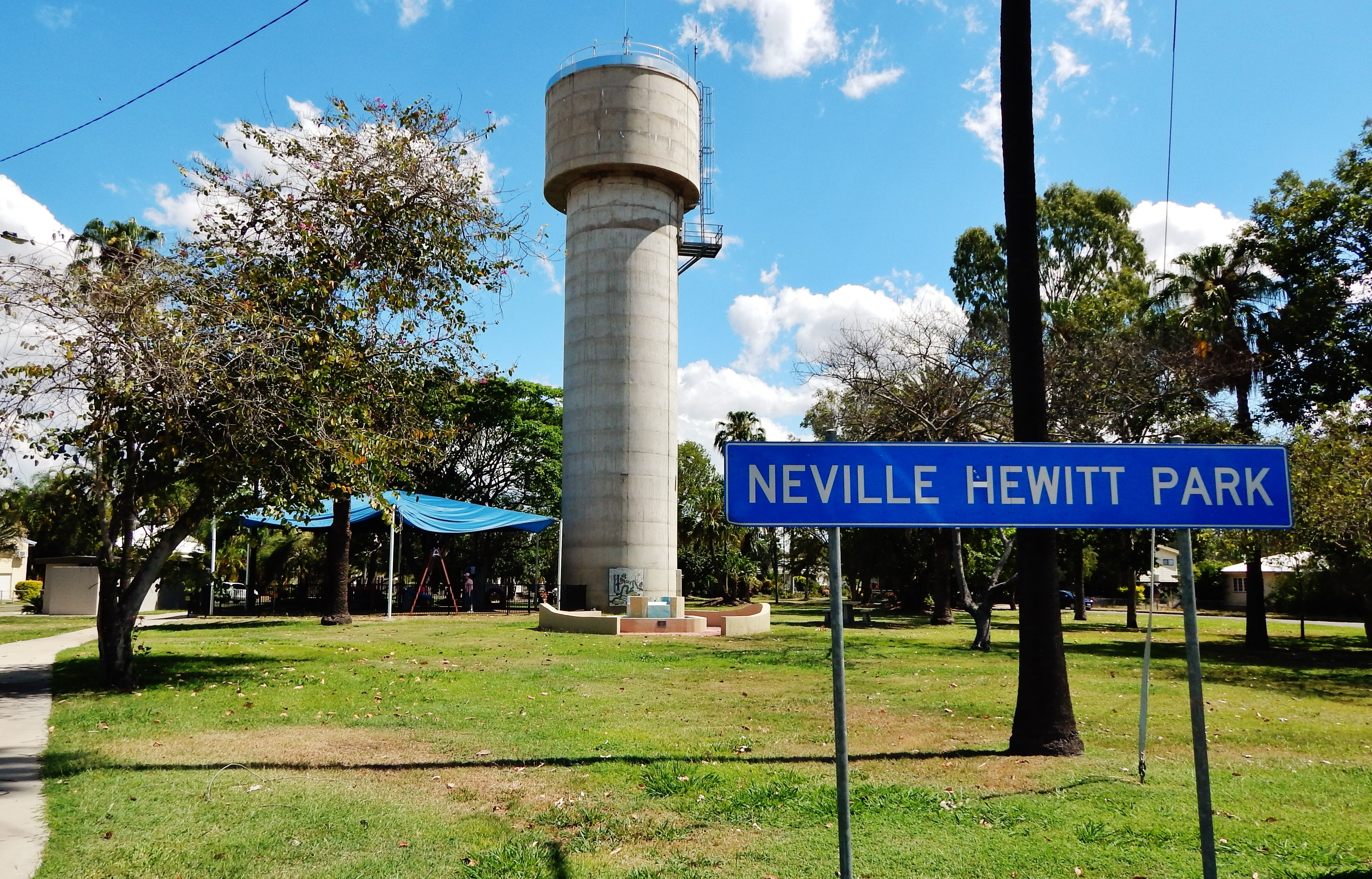
Neville Hewitt Park in Theodore, 2016

Landmarks which bear Hewitt's name include Theodore's Neville Hewitt Park and the Neville Hewitt Weir in Baralaba which was built in 1976 enabling water to be supplied to the Aboriginal community of Woorabinda. The Neville Hewitt Bridge built over the Fitzroy River in Rockhampton was also named in Hewitt's honour and officially opened on 16 August 1980 to cater for the city's increasing traffic.

Parliament of Queensland
Preceded by Paddy Whyte	Member for Mackenzie; 1956–1972	Abolished
New seat	Member for Auburn; 1972–1980	Succeeded by Neville Harper
