= Electoral district of Bundaberg =

State electoral district of Queensland, Australia

Bundaberg Queensland—Legislative Assembly
- Map of the electoral district of Bundaberg, 2017
- State: Queensland
- MP: Tom Smith
- Party: Labor
- Namesake: Bundaberg
- Electors: 35,296 (2020)
- Area: 108 km^{2} (41.7 sq mi)
- Demographic: Provincial
- Coordinates: 24°52′S 153°20′E
Electorates around Bundaberg:
Burnett	Burnett	Burnett
Burnett	Bundaberg	Burnett
Burnett	Burnett	Burnett

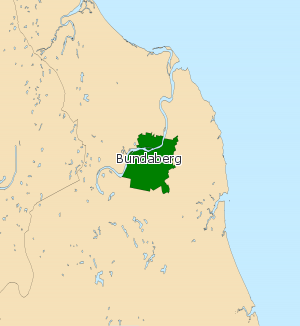
2008 electoral map

Bundaberg is an electoral district of the Legislative Assembly of Queensland in central Queensland, Australia. It covers the city of Bundaberg, as well as the immediate surrounding area.

== History ==
The electoral district of Bundaberg was created by the Electoral Districts Act of 1887 which abolished the electoral district of Mulgrave that had included the Bundaberg area. The first election held in the seat of Bundaberg was the 1888 election.

The city's urban population has long made the seat a Labor stronghold; it was in Labor hands for all but a few years from 1892 to 2006, even during the height of Joh Bjelke-Petersen's popularity. This changed in 2005 when the practices of rogue surgeon Jayant Patel at the Bundaberg Base Hospital were uncovered. The Beattie government was seriously embarrassed by the subsequent Commissions of Inquiry into the matter, and as a result the seat fell to the Nationals. It became a Liberal National seat with the conservative parties' merger in 2008, and stayed in LNP hands for all but one term until 2020.

In 2020, the Labor Party won the seat by nine votes. It is currently an extremely marginal seat. Labor retained the seat in 2024 (although it lost government) and picked up a small swing in its favour.

== Members for Bundaberg ==
Member	Party	Term
Walter Adams	Conservative	1888–1890
Walter Adams	Ministerial	1890–1892
George Hall	Labour	1892–1893
Michael Duffy	Ministerial	1893–1896
Thomas Glassey	Labour	1896–1901
George Barber	Labor	1901–1935
Bernard McLean	Labor	1935–1941
Frank Barnes	Andrew Fisher Labor	1941–1944
Frank Barnes	Frank Barnes Labor	1944–1950
Ted Walsh	Labor	1950–1957
Ted Walsh	Queensland Labor	1957–1963
Ted Walsh	Independent	1963–1969
Lou Jensen	Labor	1969–1976
Lou Jensen	Independent	1976–1977
Jim Blake	Labor	1977–1983
Clem Campbell	Labor	1983–1998
Nita Cunningham	Labor	1998–2006
Jack Dempsey	National	2006–2008
Jack Dempsey	Liberal National	2008–2015
Leanne Donaldson	Labor	2015–2017
David Batt	Liberal National	2017–2020
Tom Smith	Labor	2020–present

== Election results ==
2024 Queensland state election: Bundaberg
Party	Candidate	Votes	%	±%
Labor	Tom Smith	13,253	41.47	−1.73
Liberal National	Bree Watson	12,262	38.37	−3.17
One Nation	Alberto Carvalho	2,451	7.67	+1.87
Legalise Cannabis	Ian Zunker	1,857	5.81	+0.31
Greens	Nat Baker	1,089	3.41	+0.21
Independent	Geoff Warham	603	1.89	+1.89
Independent	Alan Corbett	442	1.38	+1.38
Total formal votes		31,957	95.02	−1.46
Informal votes		1,676	4.98	+1.46
Turnout		33,633	88.57	−0.33
Two-party-preferred result
Labor	Tom Smith	16,460	51.51	+1.51
Liberal National	Bree Watson	15,497	48.49	−1.51
Labor hold		Swing	+1.51	
