= Jim Blake (Australian politician) =

Australian politician

Member of the Queensland Legislative Assembly for Isis
- In office 16 November 1968 – 7 December 1974
- Preceded by: Jack Pizzey
- Succeeded by: Lin Powell

Member of the Queensland Legislative Assembly for Bundaberg
- In office 12 November 1977 – 22 October 1983
- Preceded by: Lou Jensen
- Succeeded by: Clem Campbell

Personal details
- Born: James Robert Henry Blake; 6 October 1921 Childers, Queensland, Australia
- Died: 9 April 2010 (aged 88) Bundaberg, Queensland, Australia
- Resting place: Childers Lawn Cemetery
- Party: Labor
- Spouse: Edna Mavis Berg (m.1951 d.1980)
- Occupation: Sugarcane farmer

James Robert Henry Blake (6 October 1921 – 9 April 2010) was a sugarcane farmer and member of the Queensland Legislative Assembly.

== Biography ==
Blake was born in Childers, Queensland, to parents Harold Joseph Blake and his wife Eva Lillian (née Pitt). He attended Doolbi Primary School, Childers Junior High School and Brisbane Technical College. Blake served in the 2d AIF in World War II, rising to the rank of Lance Bombardier with the 2/8 Field Regiment, 9 Division from 1941 until 1945 and on his return was a sugarcane farmer and trawlerman.

On 21 April 1951, he married Edna Mavis Berg and together they had four daughters. He died in Bundaberg in April 2010 and was buried in the Childers Lawn Cemetery.

== Public career ==
When the Queensland Premier, Jack Pizzey, died in 1968, a by-election was held later in the year for his former seat of Isis in the Queensland Legislative Assembly. Blake, for the Labor Party, won the seat, which had always been held by the Country Party since its inception in 1932. He held Isis until his defeat in the 1974 rout of the Labor Party.

Three years later, at the 1977 state elections, he won the seat of Bundaberg. He then remained its member until his retirement in 1983.

Blake was always on the opposition benches during his time in parliament and he held the following roles:

- Member of the Parliamentary Printing Committee 1969–1974
- Opposition spokesman for Primary Industries 1970–1974 and 1978–1982
- Member of the Parliamentary Delegation to Asia 1980
- Opposition Spokesman for Lands, Forestry and Water Resources 1977–1978
- Opposition Spokesman for Primary Industries and Fisheries 1982

His interests included community problems, music and sport, boating, fishing and skin-diving. He was an executive on the Isis District Canegrowers and a vice-patron of the TPI Association (Bundaberg branch). In 2001 Blake was awarded a Centenary Medal by the federal government for his service to parliament, politics and the community.

Parliament of Queensland
Preceded by Jack Pizzey	Member for Isis; 1968–1974	Succeeded by Lin Powell
Preceded by Lou Jensen	Member for Bundaberg; 1977–1983	Succeeded by Clem Campbell
