= Electoral results for the district of Wynnum =

Queensland, Australia, district election results

This is a list of electoral results for the electoral district of Wynnum in Queensland state elections.

== Members for Wynnum ==
Member	Party	Term
Walter Barnes	National/United/CPNP	1923–1933
James Bayley	Country and Progressive National Party	1933–1935
John Donnelly	Labor Party	1935–1938
Bill Dart	United Australia Party	1938–1944
Bill Gunn	Labor Party	1944–1966
Ted Harris	Labor Party	1966–1974
Bill Lamond	Country Party/National Party	1974–1977
Eric Shaw	Labor Party	1977–1986

== Election results ==
=== Elections in the 1980s ===
1983 Queensland state election: Wynnum
Party	Candidate	Votes	%	±%
Labor	Eric Shaw	9,267	55.7	+3.3
National	Michael Podagiel	5,469	32.9	+3.3
Liberal	Audrey Dickie	1,888	11.4	−6.6
Total formal votes		16,624	98.3	−0.5
Informal votes		281	1.7	+0.5
Turnout		16,905	93.0	+3.0
Two-party-preferred result
Labor	Eric Shaw	9,689	58.3	+1.0
National	Michael Podagiel	6,935	41.7	−1.0
Labor hold		Swing	+1.0	

1980 Queensland state election: Wynnum
Party	Candidate	Votes	%	±%
Labor	Eric Shaw	8,068	52.4	+3.6
National	Merven Hoppner	4,556	29.6	−7.0
Liberal	Vanessa Gregory	2,781	18.1	+10.8
Total formal votes		15,405	98.8	+0.1
Informal votes		184	1.2	−0.1
Turnout		15,589	90.0	−2.4
Two-party-preferred result
Labor	Eric Shaw	8,833	57.3	+3.2
National	Merven Hoppner	6,572	42.7	−3.2
Labor hold		Swing	+3.2	

=== Elections in the 1970s ===
1977 Queensland state election: Wynnum
Party	Candidate	Votes	%	±%
Labor	Eric Shaw	7,290	48.8	+1.8
National	Bill Lamond	5,462	36.6	+6.9
Liberal	Douglas Graeme-Clark	1,087	7.3	−15.3
Democrats	Graham Shuker	1,099	7.4	+7.4
Total formal votes		14,938	98.7	
Informal votes		191	1.3	
Turnout		15,129	92.4	
Two-party-preferred result
Labor	Eric Shaw	8,076	54.1	+4.2
National	Bill Lamond	6,862	45.9	−4.2
Labor gain from National		Swing	+4.2	

1974 Queensland state election: Wynnum
Party	Candidate	Votes	%	±%
Labor	Ted Harris	5,829	47.0	−16.3
National	Bill Lamond	3,686	29.7	+29.7
Liberal	William Vaughan	2,734	22.6	−6.9
Queensland Labor	Gordon Randall	150	1.2	−6.0
Total formal votes		12,399	98.6	0.0
Informal votes		178	1.4	0.0
Turnout		12,577	93.2	−0.4
Two-party-preferred result
National	Bill Lamond	6,211	50.1	+14.6
Labor	Ted Harris	6,188	49.9	−14.6
National gain from Labor		Swing	+14.6	

1972 Queensland state election: Wynnum
Party	Candidate	Votes	%	±%
Labor	Ted Harris	7,352	63.3	+2.8
Liberal	Brian Cahill	3,427	29.5	−2.1
Queensland Labor	Gordon Randall	835	7.2	+1.4
Total formal votes		11,614	98.6	
Informal votes		167	1.4	
Turnout		11,781	93.6	
Two-party-preferred result
Labor	Ted Harris	7,493	64.5	+1.5
Liberal	Brian Cahill	4,121	35.5	−1.5
Labor hold		Swing	+1.5	

=== Elections in the 1960s ===
1969 Queensland state election: Wynnum
Party	Candidate	Votes	%	±%
Labor	Ted Harris	8,076	60.5	+5.8
Liberal	Noel Justo	4,222	31.6	−6.7
Queensland Labor	Gordon Randall	777	5.8	+0.4
Communist	R.A. Annear	270	2.0	+0.4
Total formal votes		13,345	98.2	0.0
Informal votes		241	1.8	0.0
Turnout		13,586	91.8	−2.3
Two-party-preferred result
Labor	Ted Harris	8,437	63.2	+6.2
Liberal	Noel Justo	4,908	36.8	−6.2
Labor hold		Swing	+6.2	

1966 Queensland state election: Wynnum
Party	Candidate	Votes	%	±%
Labor	Ted Harris	6,986	54.7	−10.5
Liberal	Ian Beath	4,896	38.3	+7.8
Queensland Labor	Terence Burns	685	5.4	+1.0
Communist	Stella Nord	207	1.6	+1.6
Total formal votes		12,774	98.2	−0.3
Informal votes		238	1.8	+0.3
Turnout		13,012	94.1	−1.0
Two-party-preferred result
Labor	Ted Harris	7,279	57.0	−9.0
Liberal	Ian Beath	5,495	43.0	+9.0
Labor hold		Swing	−9.0	

1963 Queensland state election: Wynnum
Party	Candidate	Votes	%	±%
Labor	Bill Gunn	8,114	65.2	+1.8
Liberal	Oswald Brunner	3,797	30.5	+0.5
Queensland Labor	Kevin O'Regan	544	4.4	−2.3
Total formal votes		12,455	98.5	−0.4
Informal votes		187	1.5	+0.4
Turnout		12,642	95.1	+2.4
Two-party-preferred result
Labor	Bill Gunn	8,215	66.0	
Liberal	Oswald Brunner	4,240	34.0	
Labor hold		Swing	N/A	

1960 Queensland state election: Wynnum
Party	Candidate	Votes	%	±%
Labor	Bill Gunn	7,789	63.4	
Liberal	George Dodd	3,684	30.0	
Queensland Labor	George Campbell	819	6.7	
Total formal votes		12,292	98.9	
Informal votes		130	1.1	
Turnout		12,422	92.7	
Labor hold		Swing		

=== Elections in the 1950s ===
1957 Queensland state election: Wynnum
Party	Candidate	Votes	%	±%
Labor	Bill Gunn	7,807	52.3	−13.1
Liberal	Peter McAdam	5,170	34.6	0.0
Queensland Labor	James Pendergast	1,821	12.2	+12.2
Independent	William St George-Grambauer	126	0.8	+0.8
Total formal votes		14,924	98.9	+0.2
Informal votes		170	1.1	−0.2
Turnout		15,094	95.1	+2.0
Labor hold		Swing	−5.2	

1956 Queensland state election: Wynnum
Party	Candidate	Votes	%	±%
Labor	Bill Gunn	9,354	65.4	−4.1
Liberal	Charles Mengel	4,954	34.6	+4.1
Total formal votes		14,308	98.7	−0.2
Informal votes		192	1.3	+0.2
Turnout		14,500	93.1	−0.8
Labor hold		Swing	−4.1	

1953 Queensland state election: Wynnum
Party	Candidate	Votes	%	±%
Labor	Bill Gunn	9,261	69.5	+8.5
Liberal	Charles Mengel	4,066	30.5	−8.5
Total formal votes		13,327	98.9	−0.2
Informal votes		152	1.1	+0.2
Turnout		13,479	93.9	−1.2
Labor hold		Swing	+8.5	

1950 Queensland state election: Wynnum
Party	Candidate	Votes	%	±%
Labor	Bill Gunn	7,103	61.0	
Liberal	Bill Dart	4,548	39.0	
Total formal votes		11,651	99.1	
Informal votes		105	0.9	
Turnout		11,756	95.1	
Labor hold		Swing		

=== Elections in the 1940s ===
1947 Queensland state election: Wynnum
Party	Candidate	Votes	%	±%
Labor	Bill Gunn	8,163	52.7	+16.1
People's Party	Syd Ewart	4,797	31.0	+3.7
Independent	Albert Barrett	1,319	8.5	+8.5
Frank Barnes Labor	Thomas Ebbage	1,208	7.8	+7.8
Total formal votes		15,550	98.2	−0.6
Informal votes		218	1.8	+0.6
Turnout		15,768	92.8	+1.1
Labor hold		Swing	+5.8	

1944 Queensland state election: Wynnum
Party	Candidate	Votes	%	±%
Labor	Bill Gunn	4,457	36.6	−3.9
People's Party	William Kempson	3,333	27.3	−23.9
Independent	Bill Dart	2,549	20.9	+20.9
Communist	Joseph Bailes	1,846	15.2	+6.8
Total formal votes		12,185	98.8	+0.8
Informal votes		148	1.2	−0.8
Turnout		12,333	91.7	+0.2
Labor gain from People's Party		Swing	+13.0	

1941 Queensland state election: Wynnum
Party	Candidate	Votes	%	±%
United Australia	Bill Dart	5,698	51.2	+17.9
Labor	William Laracy	4,506	40.5	+4.0
Independent Socialist	Joseph Bailes	930	8.3	+8.3
Total formal votes		11,134	98.0	−0.6
Informal votes		222	2.0	+0.6
Turnout		11,356	91.5	−2.5
United Australia hold		Swing	+3.7	

- Preferences were not distributed.

=== Elections in the 1930s ===
1938 Queensland state election: Wynnum
Party	Candidate	Votes	%	±%
Labor	John Donnelly	4,041	36.5	−14.0
United Australia	Bill Dart	3,687	33.3	−1.4
Protestant Labour	Samuel Greene	2,290	20.7	+20.7
Social Credit	Thomas Ebbage	1,050	9.5	−5.3
Total formal votes		11,068	98.6	0.0
Informal votes		154	1.4	0.0
Turnout		11,222	94.0	−0.8
Two-party-preferred result
United Australia	Bill Dart	4,671	52.1	
Labor	John Donnelly	4,298	47.9	
United Australia gain from Labor		Swing	N/A	

1935 Queensland state election: Wynnum
Party	Candidate	Votes	%	±%
Labor	John Donnelly	5,005	50.5	
CPNP	James Bayley	3,434	34.7	
Social Credit	Joanna Helbach	1,466	14.8	
Total formal votes		9,905	98.6	
Informal votes		144	1.4	
Turnout		10,049	94.8	
Labor gain from CPNP		Swing		

- Preferences were not distributed.

1933 Wynnum state by-election
Party	Candidate	Votes	%	±%
CPNP	James Bayley	4,170	46.3	−3.2
Labor	John Donnelly	4,096	45.5	+2.6
Queensland Party	William Argaet	505	6.3	−1.3
Communist	Bert Hurworth	167	1.9	+1.9
Total formal votes		8,998	98.9	−0.4
Informal votes		101	1.1	+0.4
Turnout		9,099		
Two-party-preferred result
CPNP	James Bayley	4,385	50.9	−2.9
Labor	John Donnelly	4,236	49.1	+2.9
CPNP hold		Swing	−2.9	

1932 Queensland state election: Wynnum
Party	Candidate	Votes	%	±%
CPNP	Walter Barnes	4,224	49.5	
Labor	John Donnelly	3,658	42.9	
Queensland Party	William Argaet	651	7.6	
Total formal votes		8,533	99.3	
Informal votes		60	0.7	
Turnout		8,593	93.1	
Two-party-preferred result
CPNP	Walter Barnes	4,684	53.8	
Labor	John Donnelly	3,761	46.2	
CPNP hold		Swing		

=== Elections in the 1920s ===
1929 Queensland state election: Wynnum
Party	Candidate	Votes	%	±%
CPNP	Walter Barnes	5,368	68.3	+6.7
Labor	Fred Moore	2,492	31.7	−6.7
Total formal votes		7,860	99.1	−0.2
Informal votes		73	0.9	+0.2
Turnout		7,933	91.8	+0.8
CPNP hold		Swing	+6.7	

1926 Queensland state election: Wynnum
Party	Candidate	Votes	%	±%
CPNP	Walter Barnes	4,458	61.6	+1.9
Labor	James McLaughlin	2,777	38.4	−1.9
Total formal votes		7,233	99.3	−0.1
Informal votes		50	0.7	+0.1
Turnout		7,283	91.0	+13.0
CPNP hold		Swing	+1.9	

1923 Queensland state election: Wynnum
Party	Candidate	Votes	%	±%
United	Walter Barnes	3,694	59.7	
Labor	John McLaughlin	2,498	40.3	
Total formal votes		6,193	99.4	
Informal votes		35	0.6	
Turnout		6,227	78.0	
United hold		Swing		
