= Electoral results for the Division of Oxley (1901–1934) =

Australian division election results

This is a list of electoral results for the Division of Oxley in Australian federal elections from the division's creation in 1901 until its abolition in 1934.

== Members ==
Member	Party	Term
Richard Edwards	Protectionist	1901–1906
Richard Edwards	Anti-Socialist	1906–1909
Richard Edwards	Liberal	1909–1913
James Sharpe	Labor	1913–1917
James Bayley	Nationalist	1917–1931
Francis Baker	Labor	1931–1934

== Election results ==
=== Elections in the 1930s ===
==== 1931 ====
1931 Australian federal election: Oxley
Party	Candidate	Votes	%	±%
Labor	Francis Baker	29,252	54.3	+4.4
United Australia	James Bayley	23,563	43.7	−6.4
Lang Labor	Frank Pforr	1,094	2.0	+2.0
Total formal votes		53,909	97.3	
Informal votes		1,480	2.7	
Turnout		55,389	95.6	
Two-party-preferred result
Labor	Francis Baker		55.8	+5.9
United Australia	James Bayley		44.2	−5.9
Labor gain from United Australia		Swing	+5.9	

=== Elections in the 1920s ===
==== 1929 ====
1929 Australian federal election: Oxley
Party	Candidate	Votes	%	±%
Nationalist	James Bayley	26,308	50.1	−3.6
Labor	Francis Baker	26,208	49.9	+3.6
Total formal votes		52,516	97.1	
Informal votes		1,575	2.9	
Turnout		54,091	95.5	
Nationalist hold		Swing	−3.6	

==== 1928 ====
1928 Australian federal election: Oxley
Party	Candidate	Votes	%	±%
Nationalist	James Bayley	26,223	53.7	−2.0
Labor	Francis Baker	22,579	46.3	+2.0
Total formal votes		48,802	93.5	
Informal votes		3,376	6.5	
Turnout		52,178	93.8	
Nationalist hold		Swing	−2.0	

==== 1925 ====
1925 Australian federal election: Oxley
Party	Candidate	Votes	%	±%
Nationalist	James Bayley	25,421	55.7	+2.4
Labor	James Sharpe	20,233	44.3	−2.4
Total formal votes		45,654	96.5	
Informal votes		1,675	3.5	
Turnout		47,329	92.2	
Nationalist hold		Swing	+2.4	

==== 1922 ====
1922 Australian federal election: Oxley
Party	Candidate	Votes	%	±%
Nationalist	James Bayley	19,552	53.3	−0.5
Labor	James Sharpe	17,146	46.7	+0.5
Total formal votes		36,698	95.8	
Informal votes		1,615	4.2	
Turnout		38,313	84.6	
Nationalist hold		Swing	−0.5	

=== Elections in the 1910s ===
==== 1919 ====
1919 Australian federal election: Oxley
Party	Candidate	Votes	%	±%
Nationalist	James Bayley	22,576	53.8	+1.0
Labor	James Sharpe	19,401	46.2	−1.0
Total formal votes		41,977	98.2	
Informal votes		791	1.8	
Turnout		42,768	87.4	
Nationalist hold		Swing	+1.0	

==== 1917 ====
1917 Australian federal election: Oxley
Party	Candidate	Votes	%	±%
Nationalist	James Bayley	21,603	52.8	+9.6
Labor	James Sharpe	19,331	47.2	−9.6
Total formal votes		40,934	98.3	
Informal votes		708	1.7	
Turnout		41,642	90.6	
Nationalist gain from Labor		Swing	+9.6	

==== 1914 ====
1914 Australian federal election: Oxley
Party	Candidate	Votes	%	±%
Labor	James Sharpe	18,234	56.8	+2.4
Liberal	James Bayley	13,841	43.2	−2.4
Total formal votes		32,075	97.6	
Informal votes		805	2.4	
Turnout		32,880	79.2	
Labor hold		Swing	+2.4	

==== 1913 ====
1913 Australian federal election: Oxley
Party	Candidate	Votes	%	±%
Labor	James Sharpe	16,744	54.4	+54.4
Liberal	David Hunter	14,027	45.6	−12.4
Total formal votes		30,771	98.1	
Informal votes		601	1.9	
Turnout		31,372	82.0	
Labor gain from Liberal		Swing	+12.4	

==== 1910 ====
1910 Australian federal election: Oxley
Party	Candidate	Votes	%	±%
Liberal	Richard Edwards	10,399	62.2	−4.4
Independent	Frederick Dent	6,317	37.8	+37.8
Total formal votes		16,716	94.9	
Informal votes		893	5.1	
Turnout		17,609	57.2	
Liberal hold		Swing	−4.4	

=== Elections in the 1900s ===
==== 1906 ====
1906 Australian federal election: Oxley
Party	Candidate	Votes	%	±%
Anti-Socialist	Richard Edwards	8,722	66.6	+66.6
Labour	Alfred Merry	4,372	33.4	−14.3
Total formal votes		13,094	95.4	
Informal votes		635	4.6	
Turnout		13,729	39.7	
Anti-Socialist gain from Protectionist		Swing	+14.3	

==== 1903 ====
1903 Australian federal election: Oxley
Party	Candidate	Votes	%	±%
Protectionist	Richard Edwards	8,846	52.3	−0.9
Labour	William Reinhold	8,062	47.7	+0.9
Total formal votes		16,908	97.8	
Informal votes		382	2.2	
Turnout		17,290	55.2	
Protectionist hold		Swing	−0.9	

==== 1901 ====
1901 Australian federal election: Oxley
Party	Candidate	Votes	%	±%
Protectionist	Richard Edwards	3,753	53.2	+53.2
Labour	Harry Turley	3,299	46.8	+46.8
Total formal votes		7,052	99.4	
Informal votes		45	0.6	
Turnout		7,097	57.8	
Protectionist win		(new seat)		
