= Edward Barton Southerden =

Australian politician

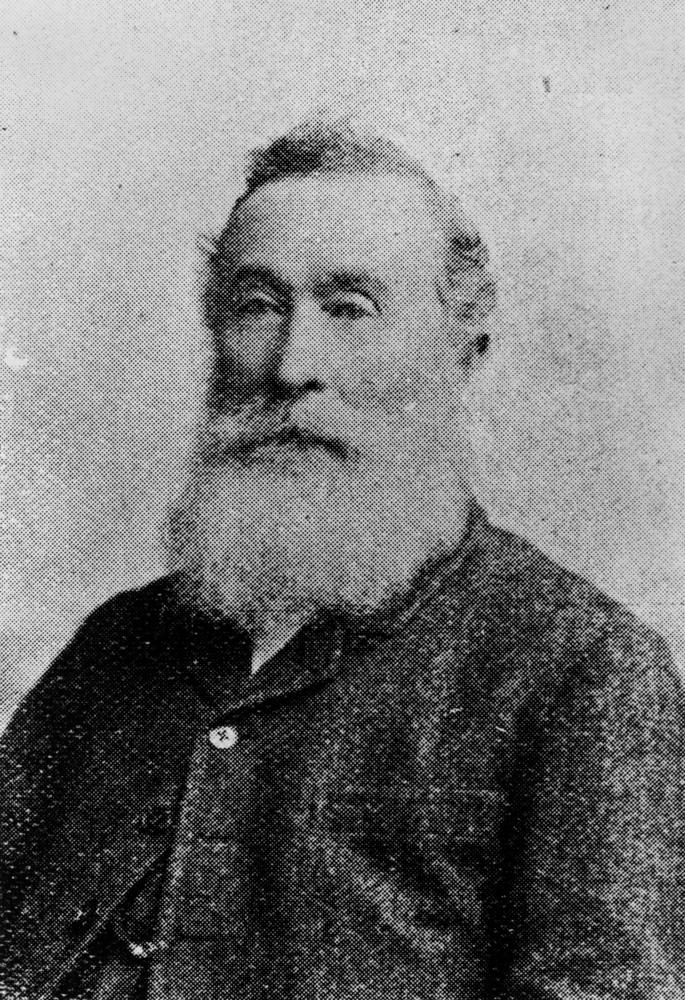
Edward Barton Southerden, Mayor of Sandgate, circa 1901

Edward Barton Southerden (1830–1906) was a businessman and politician in Brisbane, Queensland, Australia. He was the first mayor of the Town of Sandgate (now part of the City of Brisbane) and was known as the "Father of Sandgate" as he was involved in all aspects of progress and welfare of the town.

== Early life ==
Southerden was born at St Peter's, Isle of Thanet, Kent, England on 21 November 1830. In 1848, he immigrated with his brother Samuel Southerden on the Fortitude, the first of three ships chartered by the Rev Dr John Dunmore Lang to bring free immigrants to Brisbane, arriving in Moreton Bay on 21 January 1849.

== Business life ==
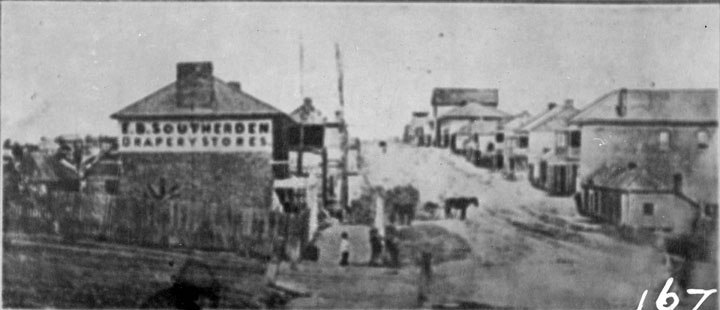
Side view of Southerden's drapery on Queen Street, viewed from Edward Street, 1862

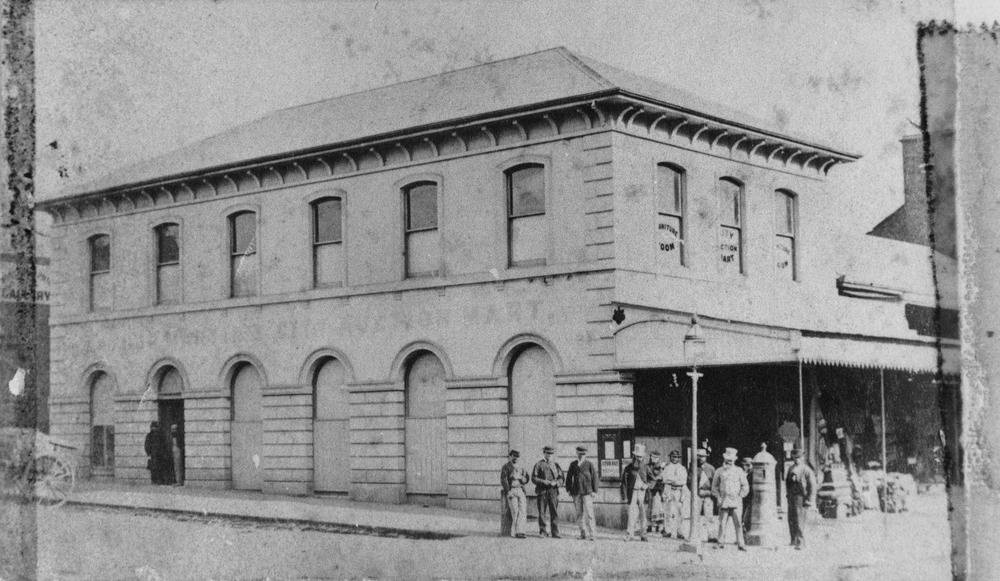
Southerden's drapery, Queen Street, circa 1873

Southerden spent 1849 in Brisbane and then moved to Ipswich where he was a sheep farmer. He then worked for H.M. Reeve's drapery business in Ipswich. In December 1853, he joined his brother Samuel Southerden in a drapery partnership in Brisbane Street, Ipswich. Their partnership was dissolved in March 1854. From there, he moved to Sydney where he worked for retail firm David Jones. He had returned to Brisbane in July 1854, purchasing the business where he had previously been employed and in January 1855 had established E. B. Southerden, Drapery Stores on Queen Street; the signage of the business appears in old Brisbane photos. The business was successful and he retired in 1864.

== Public life ==
In 1875, Southerden served on the Brisbane Municipal Council.

In 1879, Southerden advocated for Sandgate, a beachside area north of Brisbane, to be proclaimed a town. In May 1880, the municipality had been established and Southerden was one of the first council elected. At the council's first meeting in June 1880, he was unanimously elected as the first mayor of the Town of Sandgate in June 1880. Southerden was active in lobbying the Queensland Government for the construction of the Sandgate railway line from Brisbane, which was completed in 1882.

Southerden was a Justice of the Peace for 35 years and served as the returning officer for the electoral district of Nundah for 17 years. He was trustee of the Bald Hills Cemetery at Sandgate for 25 years and was for many years a trustee of the Sandgate School of Arts.

== Personal life ==
In 1855, he married Mary Elizabeth Cribb, daughter of Robert Cribb, the wedding taking place at Cribb's home, Dunmore (then a large farming estate, now part of the suburb of Milton).

Southerden was an active member of the Wharf Street Congregational Church in Brisbane for many years.

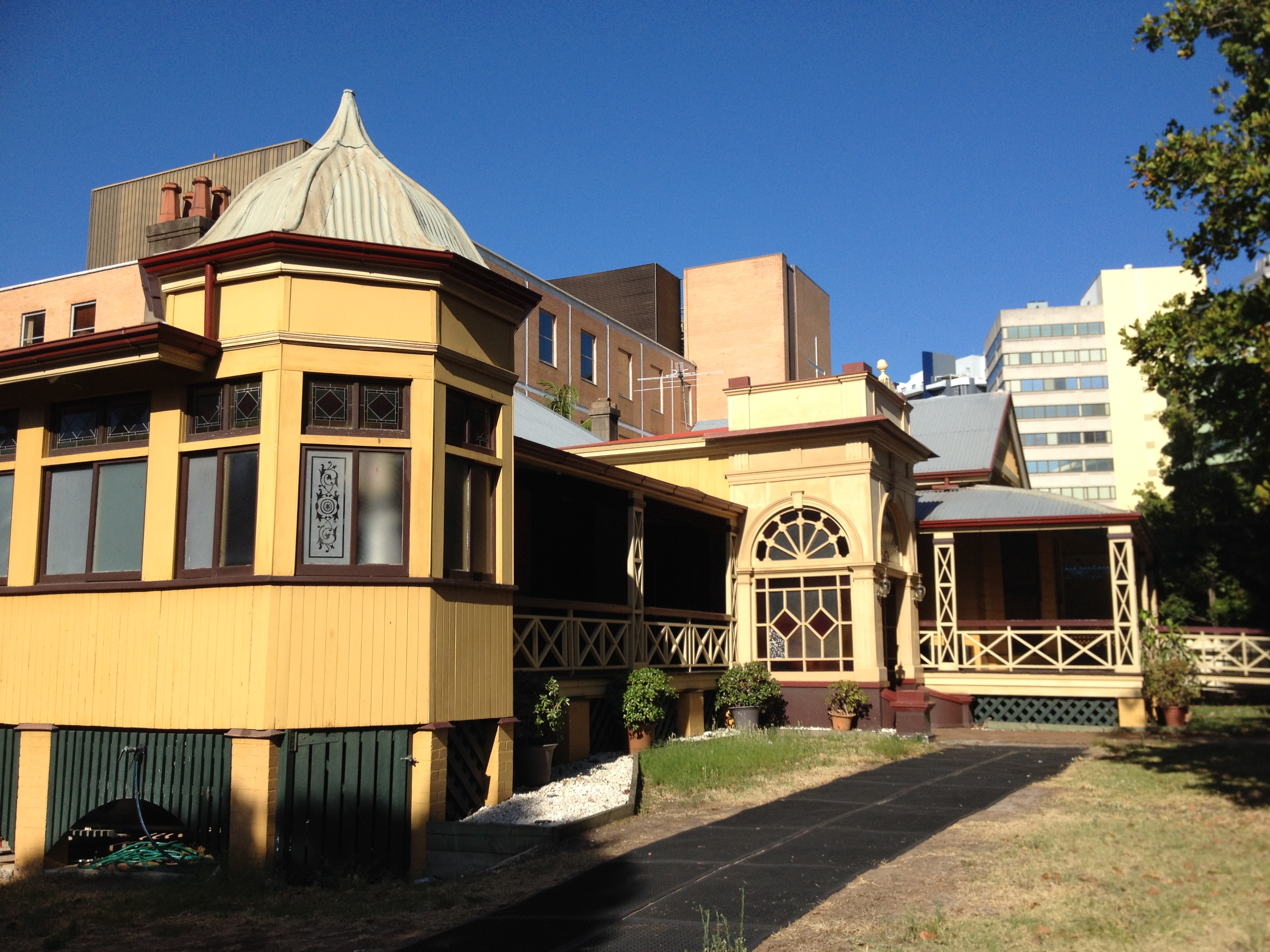
Bryntirion, Wickham Terrace, 2013

In 1861, Southerden commissioned a large house at 287 Wickham Terrace.

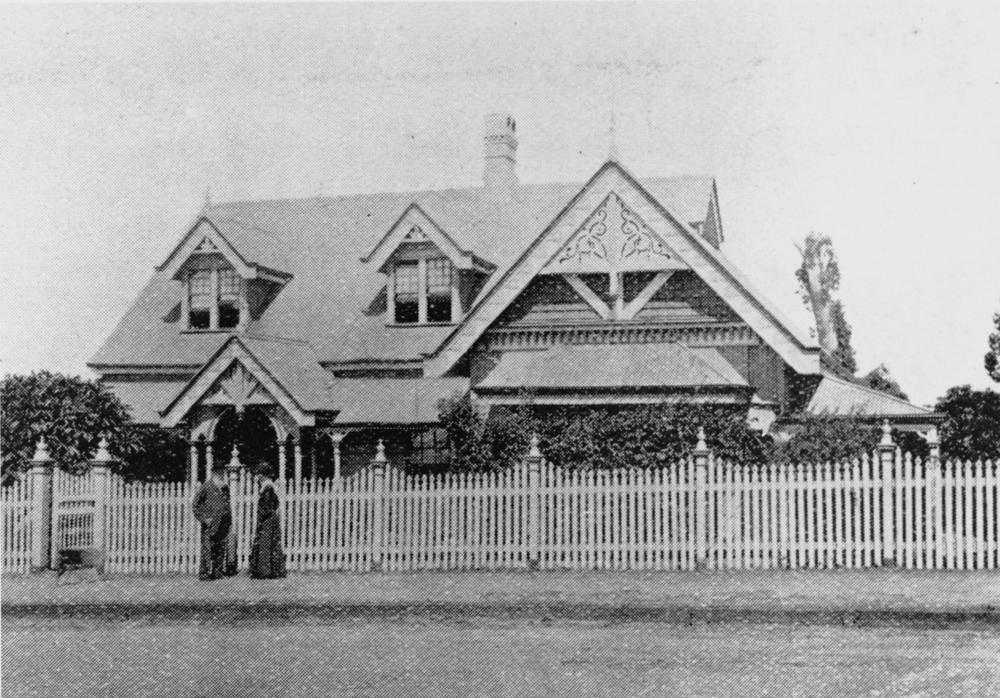
Langholme, Sandgate, 1901

In 1874, Southerden established another residence, Langholme, at Sandgate, a popular beach holiday area north of Brisbane, where he established his residence, Langholme.

In 1882, he sold the house at Wickham Terrace to Richard Edwards, another Queen Street merchant, who renamed it Bryntirion.

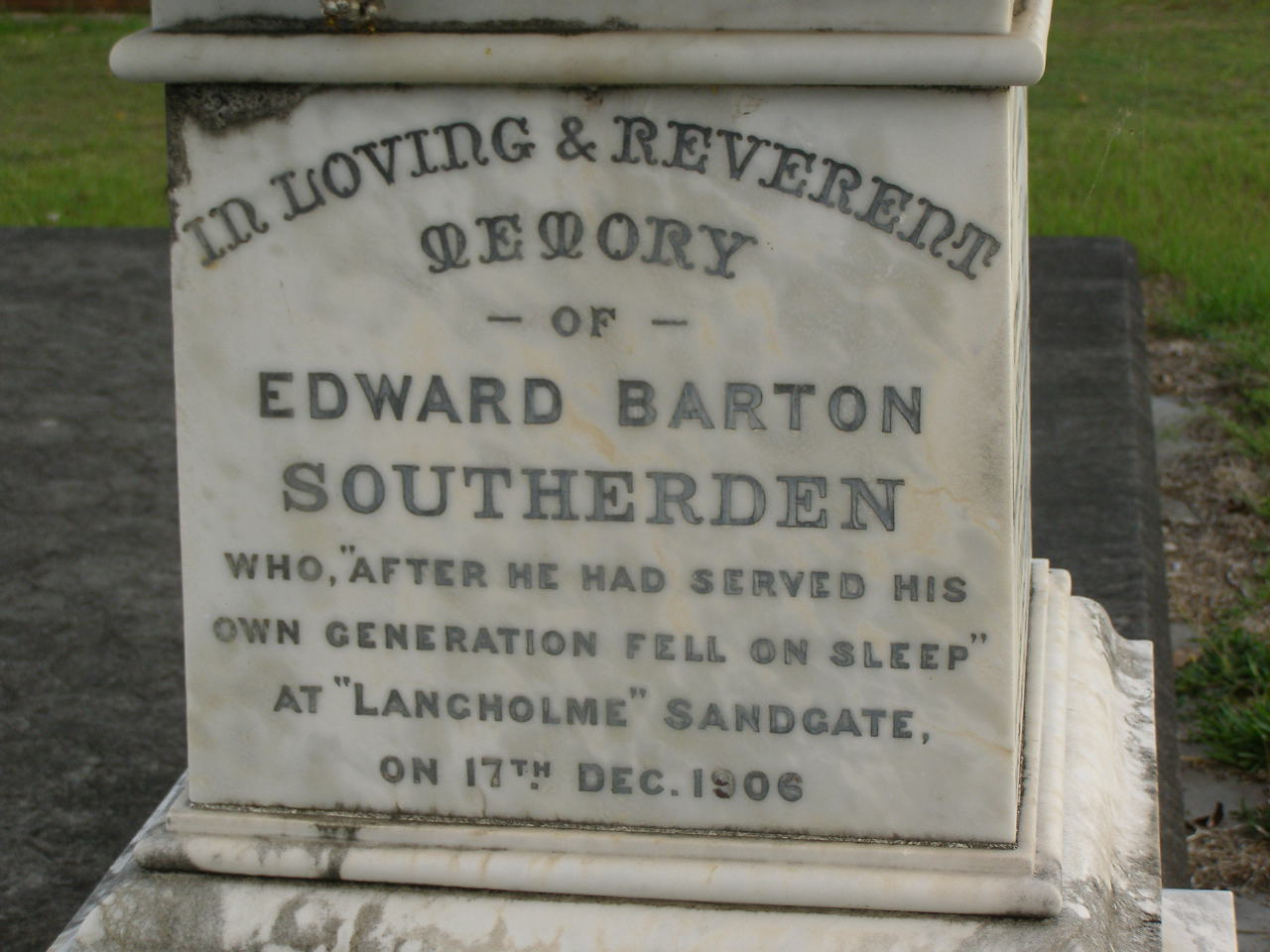
Southerden headstone, Bald Hills Cemetery, 2007

His wife died in July 1900 at Narangba. Southerden died at his residence, Langholme, at Sandgate on 17 December 1906 from pneumonia and other complications. He was buried with his wife at Bald Hills cemetery on 18 December 1906. His memorial service was held at the Sandgate Methodist Church.

== Legacy ==
Southerden's home at Wickham Terrace, then known as Bryntirion, was listed on the Queensland Heritage Register in 1993.
