= Bryntirion (Brisbane) =

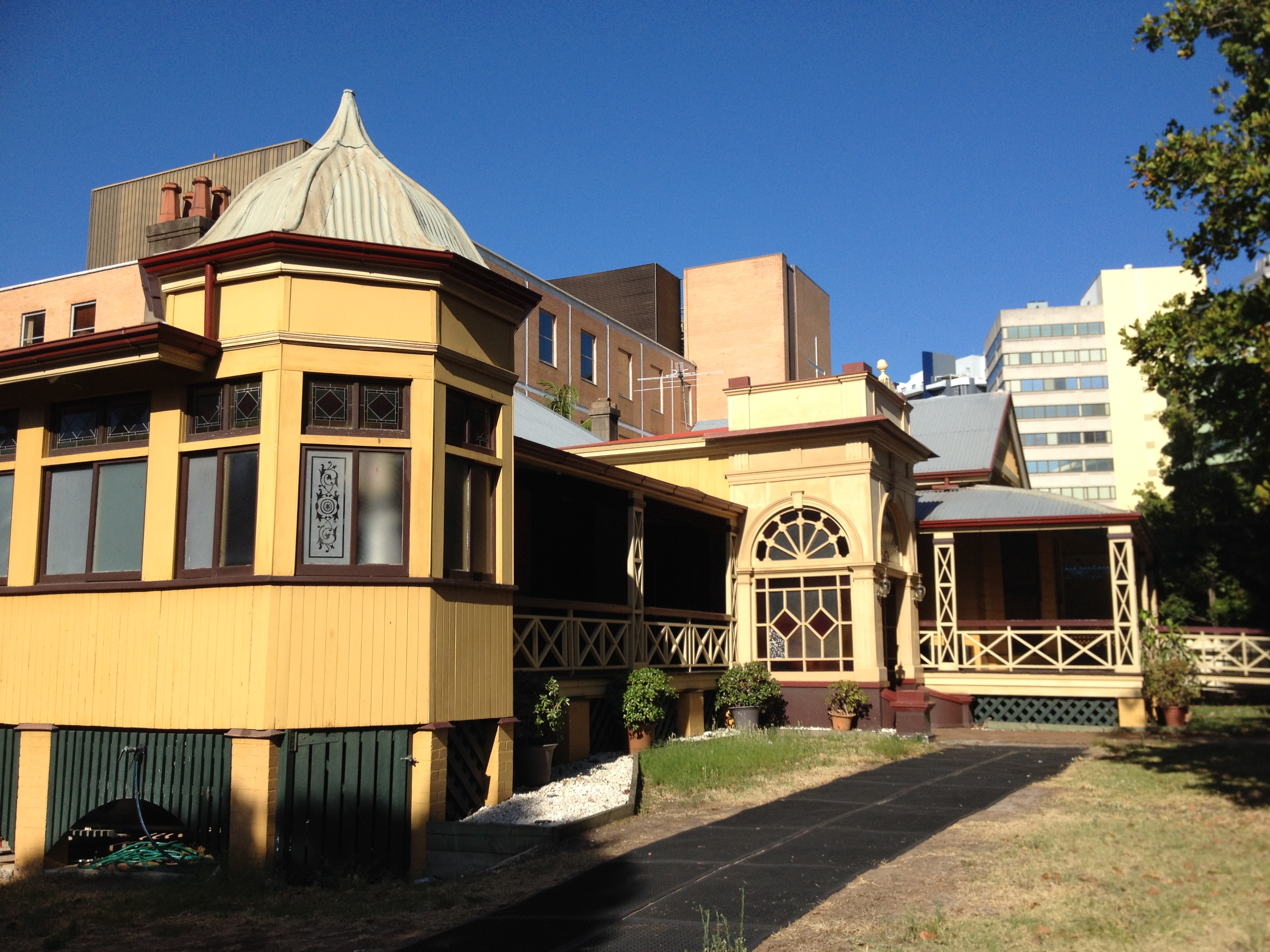
- Bryntirion, 2013

- Location within Queensland Location within Australia
- 27.4648°S 153.022°E
- Location: 287 Wickham Terrace, Spring Hill, City of Brisbane, Queensland, Australia

History
- Design period: 1840s–1860s (mid-19th century)
- Built: 1861–1930s
- Built for: Edward Barton Southerden

Site notes
- Architect: James Furnival

Queensland Heritage Register
- Official name: Bryntirion
- Type: state heritage (landscape, built)
- Designated: 17 December 1993
- Reference no.: 600166
- Significant components: trees/plantings, residential accommodation – main house, basement / sub-floor

Bryntirion is a heritage-listed detached house at 287 Wickham Terrace, Spring Hill, City of Brisbane, Queensland, Australia. It was designed by James Furnival for Edward Barton Southerden and built in 1861 with subsequent extensions. It was added to the Queensland Heritage Register on 17 December 1993.

== History ==
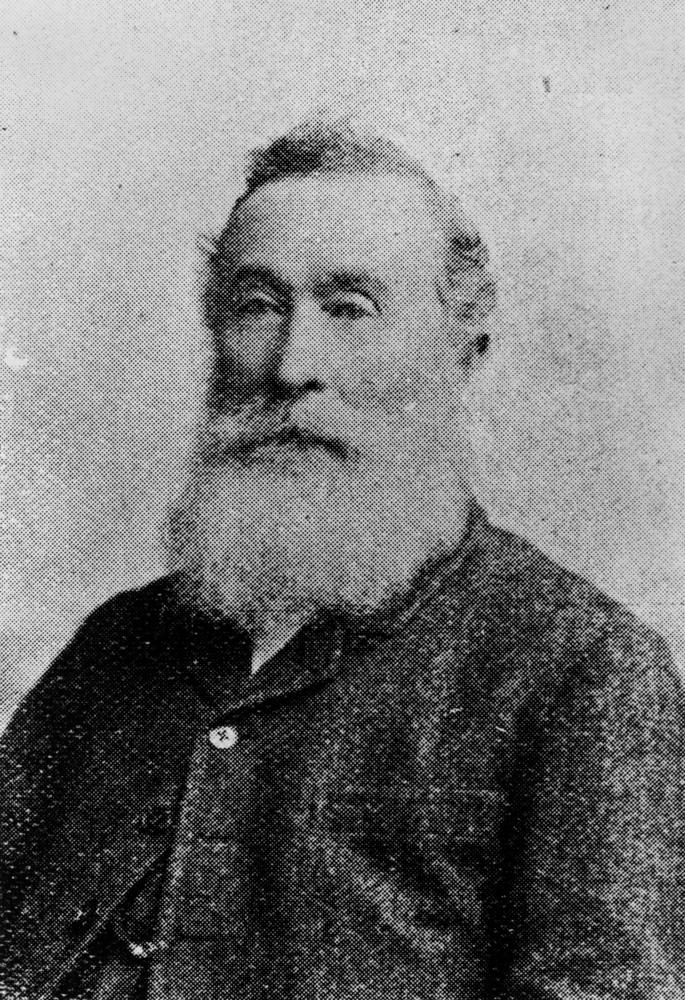
Edward Barton Southerden, circa 1901

The house was built in 1861 for Edward Barton Southerden, a successful Queen Street draper and later first Mayor of Sandgate, to a design by James Furnival who had recently established his practice in Brisbane. Extensions have included an 1876 design by Richard Gailey.

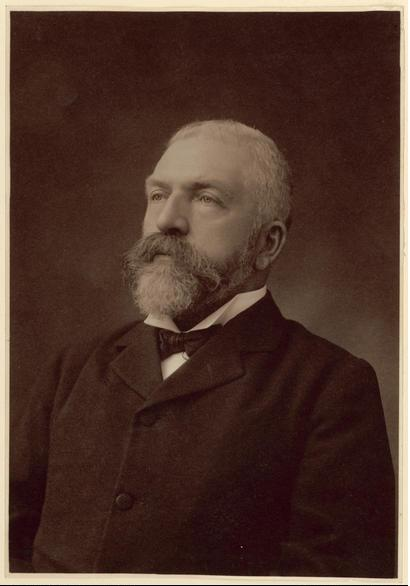
Richard Edwards, early 1900s

In 1882 it was sold to Richard Edwards who gave the house its Welsh name. Edwards was a partner in the drapery firm Edwards & Chapman, and a director of Telegraph newspapers for thirty years. He became the first member for Oxley in the Australian House of Representatives in 1901 and retired in 1913. In 1896 Edwards bought and demolished the neighbouring Athol Cottage and established Bryntirion's large garden in its place. Richard Edwards died in the house on 29 October 1915. The house remained in the family, occupied by his grandchildren and used as a doctor's surgery.

== Description ==
Bryntirion is a chamferboard house on a stone foundation with a corrugated iron roof, built in 1861 with subsequent additions to the rear, front and western elevations. The house sits on its eastern alignment and is surrounded by lush subtropical gardens on the north, south and west. Glimpses of the house from the street are through formally arranged exotic and native trees.

The stone base probably indicates the extent of the original house. Above the stone base are four rooms; two bedrooms, two reception rooms and a central hallway. The ground falls away at the rear of the building forming a room in the stone base, now disused but once the original kitchen. The original cast-iron range remains in the fireplace.

A wing projects from the rear of the house along the eastern boundary. It also has a stone base which contains the original laundry with zinc tubs. This wing is further extended by a single storey gable roofed timber structure originally built as a stables and servants accommodation. A narrow gable roofed timber addition, built in the 1930s, extends along the western side of the stone based rear wing.

The front facade has been significantly altered, mainly around 1900. It now features a projecting gable roofed room on the eastern side, a classically detailed entry porch in the centre and an attached rotunda with an ogee profiled cupola on the south west corner. These picturesquely arranged elements are connected by an open verandah. Verandahs on the west and north are enclosed. The interior of the house is intact with the exception of the reception rooms and hall which have been remodelled.

The complex of corrugated iron roofs articulates separately the mass of buildings constructed over time. The original house has the largest roof, made up of hips and valleys, the rear wings are hipped and gabled and the verandahs are flat or curved skillions. Five brick chimneys stacks of varying sizes and the pointed cupola complete the roofscape.

Bryntirion is an intact building that retains its 1860s core and garden setting.

== Heritage listing ==
Bryntirion was listed on the Queensland Heritage Register on 17 December 1993 having satisfied the following criteria.

The place is important in demonstrating the evolution or pattern of Queensland's history.

As a large villa residence embodying structural and stylistic changes from the 1860s, Bryntirion is important in demonstrating the pattern of changing affluent lifestyle and tastes in Brisbane.

The place demonstrates rare, uncommon or endangered aspects of Queensland's cultural heritage.

As one of the few remaining 1860s buildings in Brisbane, and the only example of a house on Wickham Terrace to be in continuous use as a family residence and doctor's surgery, Bryntirion demonstrates aspects of Brisbane's cultural heritage which are now rare.

The place is important in demonstrating the principal characteristics of a particular class of cultural places.

Bryntirion is important in demonstrating the principal characteristics of the layout and planting of a large private garden dating from the late nineteenth century; and of a residence built in the 1860s and extended over time.

The place is important because of its aesthetic significance.

Bryntirion is important in exhibiting a range of aesthetic characteristics valued by Brisbane's community, in particular the picturesque composition of the building's architectural elements and the contribution of the established garden to the Wickham Terrace and Burley Street streetscape.
