= Jenner House =

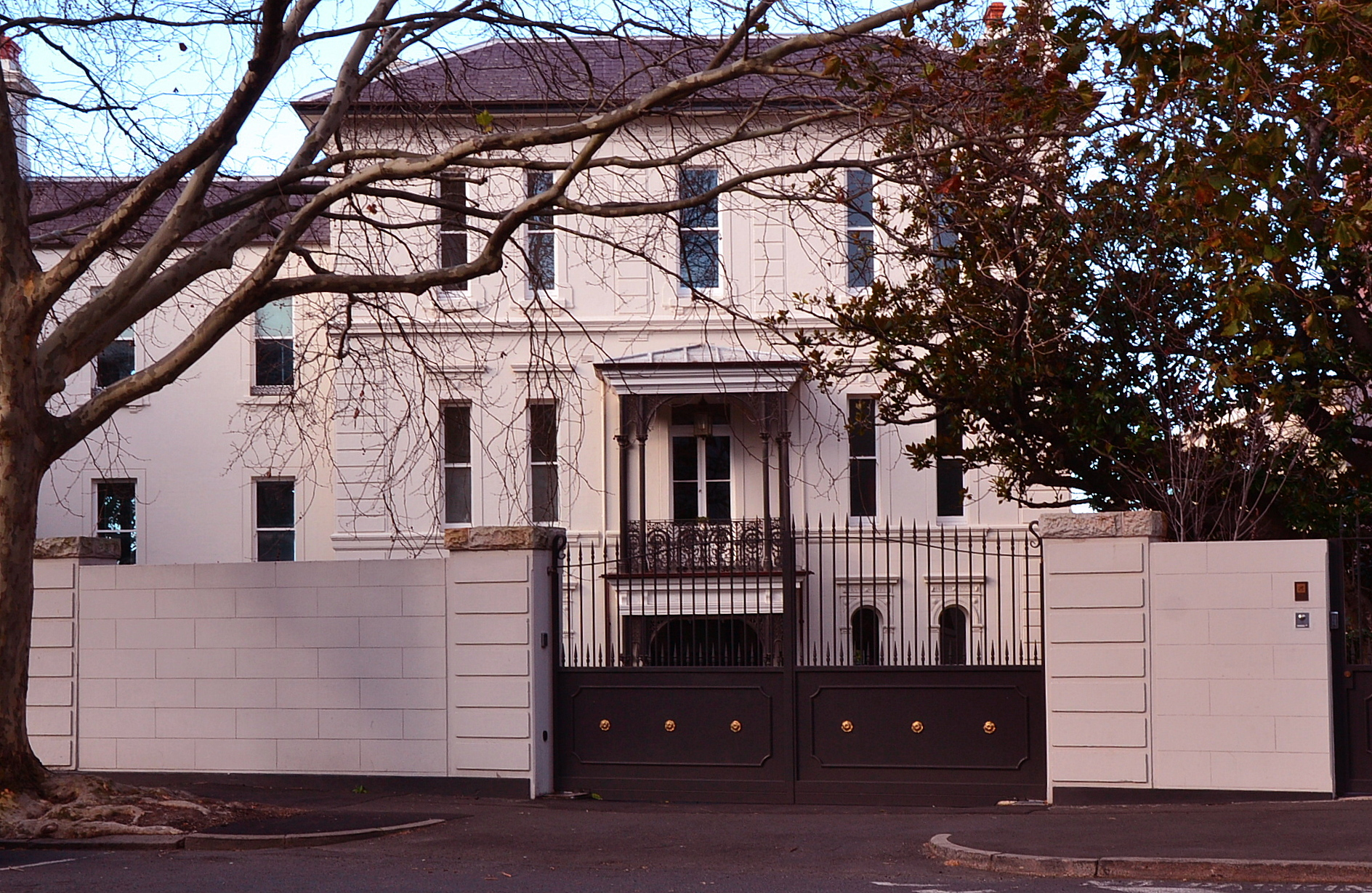
- Jenner House, pictured in 2014

- Location within Sydney Location within Australia
- 33.8678°S 151.2263°E
- Location: 2 Macleay Street, Potts Point, City of Sydney, New South Wales, Australia

History
- Built: 1871–1877

Site notes
- Architects: Edmund Blacket; Thomas Rowe (second floor)
- Architectural style: Regency Revival

New South Wales Heritage Register
- Official name: Jenner House; Fleet Club; Stramshall; Jenner Private Hospital; Kurragheen; Lugano
- Type: state heritage (built)
- Designated: 2 April 1999
- Reference no.: 776
- Type: House
- Category: Residential buildings (private)

Jenner House is a heritage-listed residence located at 2 Macleay Street in the inner city Sydney suburb of Potts Point, New South Wales, Australia. It was designed by Edmund Blacket and built in 1871, with an 1877 third-floor addition designed by Thomas Rowe. It has also been known as Fleet Club, Stramshall, Jenner Private Hospital, Kurragheen and Lugano. It was added to the New South Wales State Heritage Register on 2 April 1999.

== History ==
=== Aboriginal history ===
The "Eora people" was the name given to the coastal Aboriginal people around Sydney. Central Sydney is therefore often referred to as "Eora Country". Within the City of Sydney local government area, the traditional owners are the Cadigal and Wangal bands of the Eora. There is no written record of the name of the language spoken and currently there are debates as whether the coastal peoples spoke a separate language "Eora" or whether this was actually a dialect of the Dharug language. Remnant bushland in places like Blackwattle Bay retain elements of traditional plant, bird and animal life, including fish and rock oysters.

With the invasion of the Sydney region, the Cadigal and Wangal people were decimated but there are descendants still living in Sydney today. All cities include many immigrants in their population. Aboriginal people from across the state have been attracted to suburbs such as Pyrmont, Balmain, Rozelle, Glebe and Redfern since the 1930s. Changes in government legislation in the 1960s provided freedom of movement enabling more Aboriginal people to choose to live in Sydney.

=== Darlinghurst Ridge/Woolloomooloo Hill ===
In the 1830s the whole area from Potts Point to Kings Cross and up to Oxford Street was known as Darlinghurst – probably named in honour of Governor Ralph Darling (1824–31)'s wife, Eliza. The rocky ridge that extended inland from Potts Point was called Eastern or Woolloomooloo Hill from the early days of white settlement. The earliest grant of land on Woolloomooloo Hill was made to Judge-Advocate John Wylde in 1822. In 1830 Wylde sold six of his 4 hectares (11 acres) on the Point to Joseph Hyde Potts, accountant to the Bank of New South Wales, after whom Potts Point is named.

By the late 1820s Sydney was a crowded, disorderly and unsanitary town closely settled around the Rocks and Sydney Cove, with a European population of around 12,000. Governor Darling was receiving applications from prominent Sydney citizens for better living conditions. The ridge of Woolloomooloo Hill beckoned, offering proximity to town and incomparable views from the Blue Mountains to the heads of Sydney Harbour.

In 1828 Darling ordered the subdivision of Woolloomooloo Hill into suitable "town allotments" for large residences and extensive gardens. He then issued "deeds of grant" to select members of colonial society (in particular, his senior civil servants). The first seven grants were issued in 1828, with the other allotments formally granted in 1831.

The private residences that were built on the grants were required to meet Darling's so-called "villa conditions" which were possibly determined and overseen by his wife, who had architectural skills. These ensured that only one residence was built on each grant to an approved standard and design, that they were each set within a generous amount of landscaped land and that, in most cases, they faced the town. By the mid-1830s the parade of "white" villas down the spine of Woolloomooloo Hill presented a picturesque sight, and was visible from the harbour and town of Sydney.

=== Jenner House ===
The site was created in the 1866 subdivision of Alexander Macleay's 55 acre Elizabeth Bay estate. A 99-year lease of the lot was taken out by retailer Lebbeus Hordern who commissioned colonial architect Edmund Blacket to design a two-storey house named Stramshall (with outbuildings) in 1871. The house was erected in 1871 in Regency Revival style, the ground and first floors and service wing.

In 1875 the lease was transferred to J. T. Neale, and two years later in 1876–77 a third storey was added to a design by Thomas Rowe. The name was changed to Kurragheen, then later Lugano.

In 1915 the building became the Jenner Private Hospital, and several minor alterations were made to facilitate this use. The garage in the south western corner of the site was erected in the 1920s during the hospital period of usage of the site. The hospital saw many patients over the decades; former Sydney mayor and state MP Sir Matthew Harris died there in 1917 and serving federal MP James Sharpe died there in 1935, while Premier of South Australia Richard Layton Butler was treated there when he fell ill on a visit to Sydney in 1929.

In 1940 the site was acquired by the Commonwealth as part of a larger resumption of properties in Potts Point for the construction of the Captain Cook Graving Dock, and much of the foreshore garden was subsequently destroyed. The hospital use continued until 1952 when the Royal Australian Navy took control of the building.

In 1966 the remaining outbuildings were demolished. The building was used for a succession of naval purposes until March 1998 when it was vacated in preparation for its disposal.

The property was sold in 1998 to horse breeder Tony Peterson. A conservation management plan for the property was prepared in 2000 and Jenner was listed on the NSW State Heritage Register in 2001.

Jenner was sold in 2009 to former car dealer Terry Mullens and his wife Wendy. The Mullens' completed a three-year restoration before advertising the property for sale in June 2014.

== Description ==
=== House ===
Jenner House is a grand 19th century marine villa designed by Edmund Blacket (1871) and Thomas Rowe (third floor, 1877). It has interesting internal detailing by Blacket and his then employee J. Horbury Hunt.

The house has three levels plus a partial basement, a single storey detached 1920s garage in the south western corner of the site and remnant walls of former outbuildings in the north western part of the site. It has essentially 8 bedrooms, six bathrooms. It has polished timber floors, a huge multiple room cellar, high ceilings, solid sandstone foundation and capacious interiors.

The building represents the transition in architectural taste which took place in the second half of the 19th century with the lower two floors on the western facade exhibiting the Regency style, and elsewhere the more flamboyant asymmetrical characteristics of the 19th century Italianate villa.

=== Grounds ===
Jenner House has a frontage to Macleay Street and originally had a harbour frontage which was acquired for the construction of the Garden Island Dockyard in 1940. There are remnant walls of former outbuildings in the north-western part of the site. Adjoining development consists of eight and nine storey residential flat development.

The site also has a relationship with other 19th century marine villas of Bomera and Tarana to its north-west and Elizabeth Bay House to its south-east. The precinct is also potentially important in terms of historical archaeology both in the building fabric and remnant formal garden settings.

Jenner appears to be the only remaining garden of the once numerous 19th-century villas on Potts Point. It is also an example of a late 19th-century suburban garden with a bold design.

Gardens flank both sides of the house - on its west facing Macleay Street a 600-square-metre (6,500 sq ft) forecourt front entry garden is dominated by a carriage loop and central lawn and fountain as its focus. A large evergreen magnolia/bull bay (M.grandiflora) is a feature of this garden. A single garage is located on one side of this forecourt.

To the east is a lower rear garden, also marked by a circular lawn (and former gravel walk), edged by a significant sandstone wall above a sandstone outcropping overlooking the adjacent Navy base. The top garden is broadly a sweep of lawn, inside a large circular shape and outside it flanked by shrubberies, with a view of Sydney Harbour and heads across it from the house.

A landscape assessment undertaken in 2006 identified a number of significant landscape features as follows:

- Magnolia grandiflora at front of Jenner;
- Line of Camellia sp.to the rear of property;
- Remnant Macleay Street perimeter wall;
- Semi-circular sandstone wall at the rear of garden;
- Sandstone escarpment adjacent to sandstone wall; and
- Sandstone flagging along southeast of site.

=== Modifications and dates ===
- 1875: subdivision of Alexander Macleay's Elizabeth Bay Estate
- 1880–90: upper grassed terrace had a planting of shrubs around its periphery suggesting a circular grass shape within the terrace and defined on the periphery by a gravel path with an outer ring of sandstone edging and an inner band of low hedging with mass planted bed edged with terracotta tile edgings. Main paths leading from the central house steps curved to south and north, both with sandstone edging and later paved with bricks laid diagonally.
- 1915+: adaptation for private hospital use and residential use.
- 1920s–30s: three Magnolia trees located along southern boundary of Macleay Street entrance forecourt. Only one survives today. One close to Macleay Street may have been removed in the hospital era to construct a garage structure.
- 1940s: major portion of original eastern garden demolished when property resumed to allow construction of Garden Island Naval Dockyard complex. Eastern slopes demolished except for immediate sandstone ledge below the semi-circular stone retaining wall. Pathways leading around to stone-cut and concrete steps either side of the grassed terrace were terminated in a cut-stone overhang. The southern steps led to a circuitous path negotiating the broken landform of the foreshore slopes. The northern steps terminated in a brick-walled and corrugated iron gabled roof garden structure. The northern access appears to have been built in the Federation era (1880-1919) whilst the southern steps originally gave access to the garden house in the Late Victorian Period.
- c. 1941: The grassed terrace of the upper eastern garden was modified to accommodate a rectangular building presumably of wartime Naval use. The top pool/terrace has been significantly altered, especially with the construction of a building that was demolished between 1945 and 1952.

== Heritage listing ==
The Jenner precinct demonstrates the lifestyle of the late 19th century residents of the Potts Point area, which was characterised by the beauty of its houses and grounds and the wealth of its residents. The north wing represents a rare and valuable example of the status of the house servants. The precinct is also significant because of its 40-year period as a private hospital and for its extensive association with the Navy and with the operations of Garden Island, one of the largest engineering undertakings in 20th century Australia.

Jenner (1871) represents a fine example of the domestic work of Edmund Blacket with interesting internal detailing by Blacket and his then employee Horbury Hunt. The building's second floor was the work of Thomas Rowe in 1877. The building represents the transition in architectural taste which took place in the second half of the 19th century with the lower two floors on the western facade exhibiting the Regency style, and elsewhere the more flamboyant asymmetrical characteristics of the 19th century Italianate villa.

The building also has a relationship with other 19th century marine villas of Bomera and Tarana and Elizabeth Bay House. The precinct is also potentially important in terms of historical archaeology both in the building fabric and remnant formal garden settings.

Jenner appears to be the only remaining garden of the once numerous fashionable 19th century villas on Pott's Point, as well as a example of a late 19th century suburban garden.

Jenner House was listed on the New South Wales State Heritage Register on 2 April 1999.

== See also ==
- Australian residential architectural styles
