= Edwards and Chapman Building =

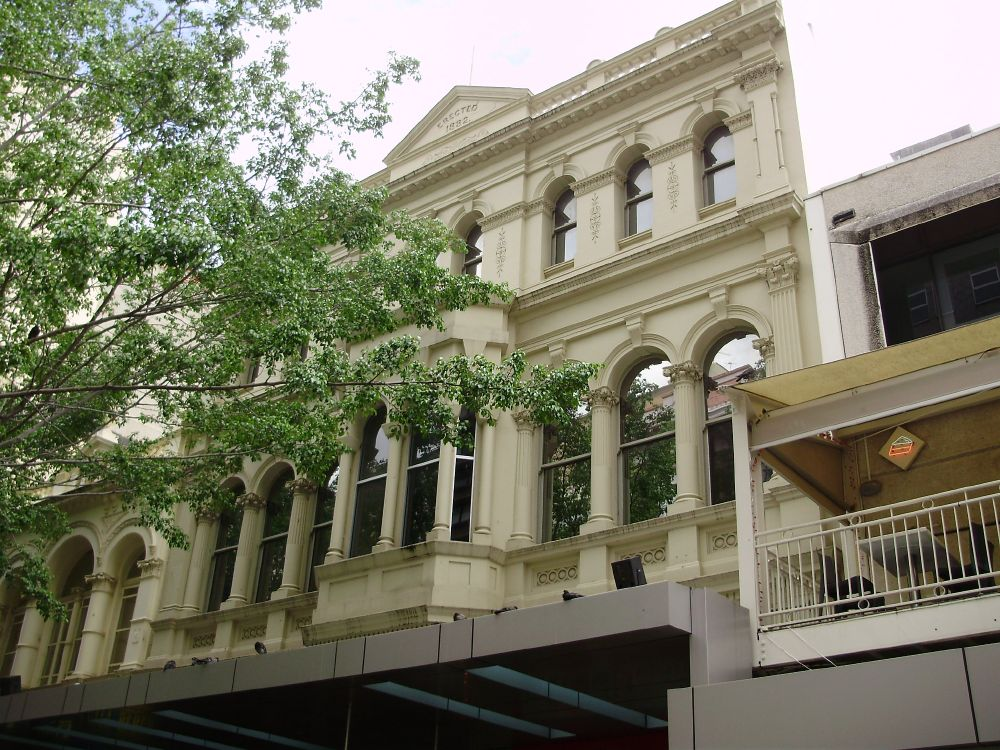
- Upper facade, former Edwards and Chapman Building, 2009

- Location within Queensland
- 27.4696°S 153.0247°E
- Location: 120 Queen Street, Brisbane City, City of Brisbane, Queensland, Australia

History
- Design period: 1870s–1890s (late 19th century)
- Built: 1881–1882
- Built for: Richard Edwards and James Chapman

Site notes
- Architect: Francis Drummond Greville Stanley
- Architectural style: Italianate

Queensland Heritage Register
- Official name: Sportsgirl, Edwards and Chapman
- Type: state heritage (built)
- Designated: 21 October 1992
- Reference no.: 600139
- Significant period: 1881–1923 (fabric); 1882–1938 (historical)
- Builders: Henry Holmes

The Edwards and Chapman Building is a heritage-listed retail warehouse at 120 Queen Street, Brisbane City, City of Brisbane, Queensland, Australia. It was designed by Francis Drummond Greville Stanley and built from 1881 to 1882 by Henry Holmes. It was added to the Queensland Heritage Register on 21 October 1992.

== History ==
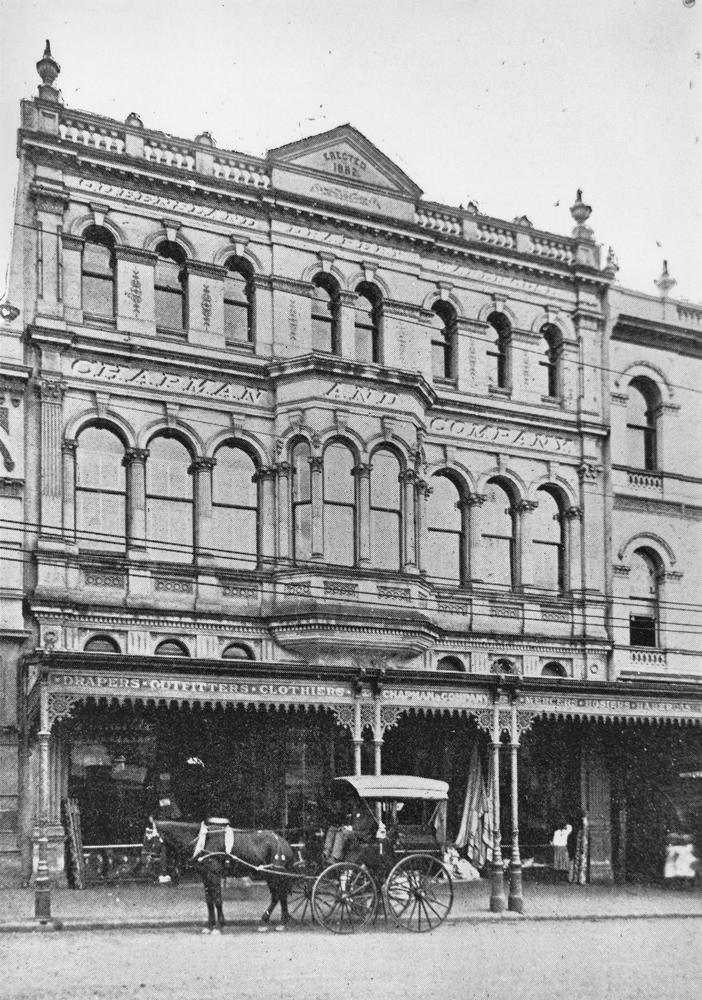
Chapman and Company drapery store, 1902

This building was erected as a retail warehouse during 1881–1882 and occupied by Edwards and Chapman in December 1882.

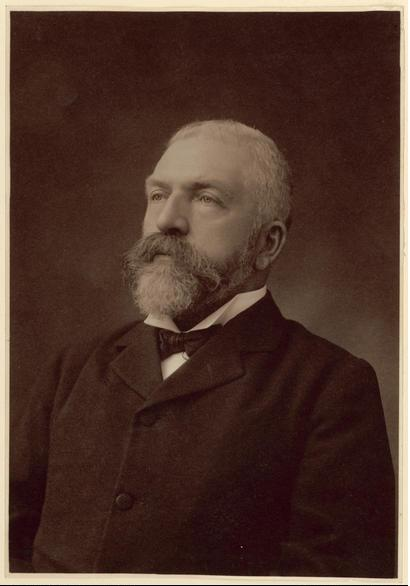
Richard Edwards, early 1900s

Welsh businessman Richard Edwards joined Scotsman James Chapman in the establishment of a drapery store in Brisbane in 1877. Successful in their venture, the two required larger premises and in September 1881 acquired deeds of grant to Allotments 13, 13A and 14 of Section 12. The convict barracks, later first parliamentary buildings and supreme court had stood on this site from 1827 until its demolition in early 1881. A government decision to dispose of this Crown land prompted the redevelopment of the northern side of Queen street bounded by the old Brisbane Town Hall (in 2016, the NEXT Hotel site) and Albert Street.

Ex-Colonial Architect Francis DG Stanley supervised the construction of the building by contractor H Holmes. With a frontage of 48 feet (15 m) to Queen Street and a depth of 138 feet (42 m), this substantial warehouse incorporated features designed to "meet the requirements of a tropical climate". The three storey building with basement was notable for its 18 feet (5.5 m) ceilings, and had an oval opening 50 by 15 feet (15.2 by 4.6 m) in each floor. This device was intended to allow ventilation and better light dispersion. A hydraulic-powered Otis lift was also incorporated in the building.

The company was dissolved when Richard Edwards retired in 1891 and James Chapman obtained title to the site in May of that year. As Chapman and Company the business diversified into soft furnishings and furniture. In 1923 extensive alterations were carried out to the shopfronts by SS Carrick under the guidance of architectural firm Hall and Prentice. The work necessitated the insertion of steel columns and girders into the existing stonework.

Chapmans sold the building in 1938 ending the a 56-year association with the site. Subsequently, the building has been occupied by many other retail businesses. In 1992 when the building was listed on the Queensland Heritage Register, it was occupied by the women's clothing store Sportsgirl. In 2016, the basement level was occupied by a pharmacy.

The building is now occupied on the three upper levels by City Beach, a Queensland-based fashion retailer.

== Description ==
The Edwards and Chapman Building located at 120 Queen Street dates from the Victorian era and was designed by FDG Stanley with ornate Italianate detailing.

It consists of three storeys with a basement and an attic level. It has a simple rectangular plan with brick back and side walls and a richly ornamented front. The rear of the building is polychrome brickwork while the front also uses lightly coloured Oamaru limestone. At street level facing Queen Street there is presently a modern shop front with a central doorway flanked by shop windows, and a suspended awning above.

The first floor level has a projecting bay or oriel window with flanking arcades. The original detail of the bay window has been replaced with a modern glazed structure. The arcading is composed of round-headed arches supported on partially fluted pilasters, with Corinthian capitals. Recessed behind the arches are plate glass windows.

The second floor level has round headed window openings in line with the arches on the level below. These openings have decorative hood mouldings, and prominent keystones of acanthus leaves. The facade is finished with a dentilled string course which is the base of a Corinthian entablature with Italianate balustrading. A vase is located above a pedestal at each end and centred above the parapet is a triangular pediment. This has the words "ERECTED 1882" engraved on the surface.

Internally the building has suffered with its changing ownership, but although the original internal columns have been encased some traces of their original decoration remain.

The rear polychrome brick facade of the building has a carefully composed elevation of arched openings with the stone base partially exposed. Little has changed to this facade since it was first constructed apart from the bricking up of some of the openings and the installation of modern entry doors for access from Burnett Lane.

The building is part of a group of surviving Victorian commercial buildings that are prominent in this portion of Queen Street.

== Heritage listing ==
The Edwards and Chapman Building was listed on the Queensland Heritage Register on 21 October 1992 having satisfied the following criteria.

The place is important in demonstrating the evolution or pattern of Queensland's history.

The building is important in demonstrating the evolution of Queensland's history, in particular the secondary phase of development in Queen Street during the early 1880s, initiated by the disposal of the convict barracks.

The place is important in demonstrating the principal characteristics of a particular class of cultural places.

The building demonstrates the principal characteristics of the commercial work of Brisbane architect, FDG Stanley and of a Victorian era commercial building with ornate Italianate detailing.

The place is important because of its aesthetic significance.

The building is important in exhibiting particular aesthetic characteristics valued by the community, in particular, its contribution to the streetscape of Queen Street as part of a group of surviving 1880s commercial buildings.
