= James Sharpe (Australian politician) =

Australian politician

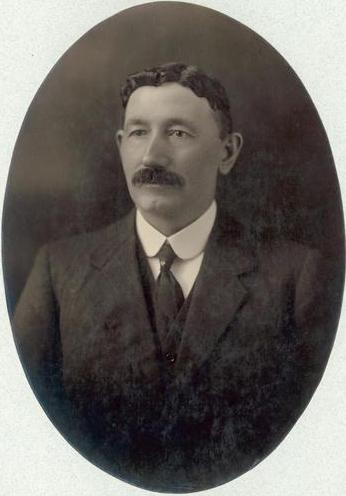

Member of the Australian Parliament for Oxley
- In office 31 May 1913 – 5 May 1917
- Preceded by: Richard Edwards
- Succeeded by: James Bayley

Personal details
- Born: 1868 Kiama, New South Wales
- Died: 8 July 1935 (aged 66–67)
- Party: Australian Labor Party
- Occupation: Journalist

James Benjamin Sharpe (1868 – 8 July 1935) was an Australian politician. He was an Australian Labor Party member of the Australian House of Representatives from 1913 to 1917, representing the electorate of Oxley

Sharpe was born at Berry in New South Wales and was educated at public schools. He went to Sydney at the age of 18, where he worked in a warehouse and established a reputation as a talented athlete in quarter-mile and hurdle racing. He later moved to Queensland, where he was the proprietor of the Kedron Park Racecourse and established and promoted night-time athletics events in Brisbane. In 1912, he funded the new Labor-aligned newspaper The Daily Standard and served as its managing director until his election to parliament in 1913. He was an unsuccessful Labor candidate at the 1912 Queensland state election.

In 1913, he was elected to the Australian House of Representatives as the Labor member for Oxley. He held the seat until his defeat in 1917 following the fallout of the 1916 Labor split.

After losing his federal seat, Sharpe worked as an auctioneer and land agent. He was a City of Brisbane alderman from March 1924 until October 1925, when the old Brisbane council was abolished with the creation of the current, much enlarged City of Brisbane. He attempted to regain his old federal seat in 1919, 1922 and 1925, but was unsuccessful.

He later relocated to Sydney, and was vice-president of the Federal Labor Party in New South Wales when most of the state party broke away as Lang Labor during the 1931 Labor split. Sharpe died at the Jenner Private Hospital in Sydney in 1935 from influenza, although he had been unwell since December 1934. He was cremated at Rookwood Crematorium and his ashes sent to Brisbane to be buried alongside his late wife in Toowong Cemetery.

Parliament of Australia
Preceded by Richard Edwards	Member for Oxley; 1913–1917	Succeeded by James Bayley
