= Bill Dart =

Australian politician (1877–1969)

Bill Dart JP
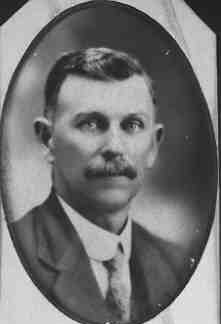
- Bill Dart, c. 1928

Member of the Queensland Legislative Assembly for Wynnum
- In office 2 April 1938 – 15 April 1944
- Preceded by: John Donnelly
- Succeeded by: Bill Gunn

Personal details
- Born: William Logan Dart; 25 August 1877 Brisbane, Queensland, Australia
- Died: 17 January 1969 (aged 91) Wynnum, Queensland, Australia
- Party: United Australia Party
- Spouse: Edith Maud Nielsen (m. 1907)
- Occupation: Farmer

William Logan Dart (25 August 1877 – 17 January 1969) was an Australian politician and farmer who served as a member of the Queensland Legislative Assembly from 1938 to 1944.

== Biography ==
Dart was born at Brisbane, Queensland, the son of the John Dart and his wife Maria Jane (née Logan). He was educated at Brisbane Central State School and in 1893 moved to Forest Hill where, along with his brother, he took up a selection. He later acquired an additional 180 acres where he became one of the leading growers of lucerne in the state. It was also later used as his homestead after his marriage.

On 21 August 1907, Dart married Edith Maude Nielsen (died 1991, aged 104) and together had two sons and two daughters. Dart died at Wynnum in January 1969 and was cremated at the Mt Thompson Crematorium.

== Public life ==
Dart was elected to the Tarampa Shire Council in 1903 and was the town chairman in 1911 when there was a change of shire boundaries and he was then elected as a councilor to the Shire of Laidley. He remained a councilor there until 1921 when he moved to Wynnum and became a real estate agent. He was soon elected to the Wynnum Town Council and on the creation of the Greater City of Brisbane became the first member for the ward of Wynnum. He was the member until shortly after winning election to the Queensland Parliament.

At the 1938 Queensland state election, Dart, representing the United Australia Party, won the seat of Wynnum, defeating the sitting member, John Donnelly. He held the seat until 1944 when, by then standing as an independent, he lost to Bill Gunn of the Labor Party.

Preceded by John Donnelly	Member for Wynnum; 1938–1944	Succeeded by Bill Gunn
