= John Donnelly (Australian politician) =

Australian politician

Member of the Queensland Legislative Assembly for Wynnum
- In office 11 May 1935 – 2 April 1938
- Preceded by: James Bayley
- Succeeded by: Bill Dart

Personal details
- Born: John Burton Donnelly; 10 May 1885 Ipswich, Queensland, Australia
- Died: 30 June 1956 (aged 71) Brisbane, Queensland, Australia
- Resting place: Hemmant Cemetery
- Party: Labor
- Spouse(s): Eileen Cecelia Crance (m.1918), Bridget Theresa McIntosh (m.1946)
- Occupation: Dentist

John Burton Donnelly (10 May 1885 - 30 June 1956) was a member of the Queensland Legislative Assembly.

== Biography ==
Donnelly was born at Ipswich, Queensland, the son of the John Donnelly and his wife Louise Bridget (née Lachetelle). He joined the First Australian Imperial Force at the start of World War I and served with the 2nd Light Horse Brigade in Gallipoli where he was wounded. He then joined the Camel Corps and was stationed in Palestine before finally joining the AAMC and working in the dental services. He returned to Australia in December 1918 with the rank of Captain having lost a brother to fighting in April of the previous year. After the war he continued his work as a dentist.

In 1918 he married Eileen Cecelia Crance. He then married Bridget Theresa McIntosh in 1946. Donnelly died in 1956 and was buried in the Hemmant Cemetery.

== Public life ==
Donnelly, representing the Labor Party, unsuccessfully contested the seat of Wynnum at the 1932 Queensland election. He once again contested Wynnum three years later and this time he defeated the sitting member, James Bayley, of the Country and Progressive National Party.

He only held the electorate for one term, being defeated by William Dart of the United Australia Party at the 1938 state election.

Preceded by James Bayley	Member for Wynnum; 1935–1938	Succeeded by Bill Dart
