= Ted Harris (politician) =

Australian politician

Member of the Queensland Legislative Assembly for Wynnum
- In office 28 May 1966 – 7 Dec 1974
- Preceded by: Bill Gunn
- Succeeded by: Bill Lamond

Personal details
- Born: Edward David Harris; 30 August 1911 Brisbane, Queensland, Australia
- Died: 2 October 1993 (aged 82) Gold Coast, Queensland, Australia
- Party: Labor
- Spouse: Marion Miller Morrison (m.1942)
- Occupation: Clothing manufacturer

Edward David Harris (30 August 1911 – 2 October 1993) was a member of the Queensland Legislative Assembly.

== Biography ==
Harris was born at Brisbane, Queensland, the son of the Alfred Edward Harris and his wife Elizabeth Roxborough (née Smith). He was educated at Goodna, Wynnum, and Sherwood state schools. He joined the RAAF in 1940 and served in the 24th and 75th Squadrons, being discharged in 1945 with the rank of sergeant. On his return to Australia he worked as a clothing manufacturer at Manly, specializing in men's and boys wear.

On 20 May 1942, Harris married Marion Miller Morrison and together had a beautiful daughter, also named Marion, and a son. He died at the Gold Coast in October 1993.

== Public life ==
Harris, for the Labor Party, won the seat of Wynnum at the 1966 Queensland state election taking over the seat from the retiring Bill Gunn. He was defeated in 1974 by Bill Lamond of the Country Party.

| Preceded by Bill Gunn | Member for Wynnum; 1966–1974 | Succeeded by Bill Lamond |
