= Eric Shaw (politician) =

Australian politician

Member of the Queensland Legislative Assembly for Wynnum
- In office 12 November 1977 – 1 November 1986
- Preceded by: Bill Lamond
- Succeeded by: Seat abolished

Member of the Queensland Legislative Assembly for Manly
- In office 1 November 1986 – 2 December 1989
- Preceded by: New seat
- Succeeded by: Jim Elder

Personal details
- Born: Eric Frank Shaw; 12 January 1936 (age 90) Wynnum, Queensland, Australia
- Party: Labor
- Other political affiliations: Independent
- Spouse: Joan Young
- Occupation: Plumber, Clerk

Eric Frank Shaw (born 12 January 1936) is a former Australian politician.

He was born in Wynnum to Thomas Bourke Shaw and Edna Eileen (née Reese). He attended Manly State School, Wynnum State High School and Central Technical School, becoming a clerk with Eagers Motors in Newstead in 1950 and then an apprentice plumber for Alan Moore & Co. Later he was a water supply, health and sewerage inspector for Brisbane City Council, to which he was elected in 1967.

A Labor member, he was elected to the Queensland Legislative Assembly in 1977 as the member for Wynnum. From 1982 he was Opposition Spokesman on Welfare, Aboriginal and Islander Affairs, moving to Local Government in January 1983 (to which Main Roads and Racing were added in November). In 1987 he lost his Labor endorsement and became an independent, retiring in 1989.

Parliament of Queensland
Preceded by Bill Lamond	Member for Wynnum; 1977–1986	Abolished
New seat	Member for Manly; 1986–1989	Succeeded by Jim Elder
