= Bill Lamond =

Australian politician

Member of the Queensland Legislative Assembly for Wynnum
- In office 7 December 1974 – 12 November 1977
- Preceded by: Edward Harris
- Succeeded by: Eric Shaw

Personal details
- Born: William McMillan Lamond; 13 July 1920 Cloncurry, Queensland, Australia
- Died: 5 July 1990 (aged 69) Brisbane, Queensland, Australia
- Party: National Party
- Spouse: Bettina Pye
- Occupation: Real estate agent

William McMillan Lamond (13 July 1920 – 5 July 1990) was an Australian politician. He was a National Party member of the Legislative Assembly of Queensland from 1974 until 1977, representing the electorate of Wynnum.

Lamond was born in Cloncurry, Queensland, and served in the Royal Australian Air Force for three years. He was a real estate agent before and after his time in parliament, and also served as president of the Wynnum Chamber of Commerce, as a mediator with the Retail Shop Leases Tribunal, and as dispute arbitrator with the Real Estate Institute of Queensland. He was appointed Chairman of the Queensland Small Business Corporation by Joh Bjelke-Petersen after leaving parliament, and chaired the National Party's small business policy committee from 1979. He remained active in retirement, assisting in the establishment of the Waterloo Bay 50s and Over Centre.

Lamond died in Brisbane in 1990. Bill Lamond Park in Lota is named in his honour.

Parliament of Queensland
Preceded by Edward Harris	Member for Wynnum; 1974–1977	Succeeded by Eric Shaw
