= Division of Oxley (1901–1934) =

Oxley Australian House of Representatives Division
- Created: 1901
- Abolished: 1934
- Namesake: John Oxley

The Division of Oxley was an Australian electoral division in the state of Queensland. It was located in the inner southern suburbs of Brisbane, and originally included the suburbs of South Brisbane, Woolloongabba and Coorparoo. By the time it was abolished in 1934, it had been redistributed to cover suburbs such as Bulimba and Murarrie.

The division was proclaimed in 1900, and was one of the original 65 divisions to be contested at the first federal election. It was named after explorer John Oxley. The Division was abolished and replaced by the Division of Griffith at the redistribution of 1 August 1934. At the redistribution of 11 May 1949, a new Division of Oxley was created in the south-western suburbs of Brisbane, primarily around Ipswich.

== Members ==
Image	Member	Party	Term	Notes
	Richard Edwards (1842–1915)	Protectionist	30 March 1901 – 1906	Retired
	Richard Edwards (1842–1915)	Anti-Socialist	1906 – 26 May 1909	Retired
	Richard Edwards (1842–1915)	Liberal	26 May 1909 – 23 April 1913	Retired
	James Sharpe (1868–1935)	Labor	31 May 1913 – 5 May 1917	Lost seat
	James Bayley (1882–1968)	Nationalist	5 May 1917 – 19 December 1931	Lost seat. Later elected to the Legislative Assembly of Queensland seat of Wynnum in 1933
	Francis Baker (1903–1939)	Labor	19 December 1931 – 15 September 1934	Transferred to the Division of Griffith after Oxley was abolished in 1934
