= Bill Gunn (Queensland politician, born 1895) =

Australian politician (1895–1970)

Bill Gunn DSO
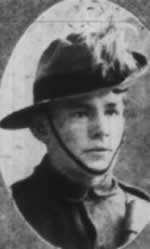
- William Morrison Gunn – In military uniform 1914

Member of the Queensland Legislative Assembly for Wynnum
- In office 15 April 1944 – 28 May 1966
- Preceded by: Bill Dart
- Succeeded by: Edward Harris

Personal details
- Born: William Morrison Gunn; 19 April 1895 Mackay, Queensland, Australia
- Died: 9 April 1970 (aged 74) Manly, Queensland, Australia
- Party: Labor
- Spouse: Edith Annie Curtis (m. 1921; d. 1971)
- Occupation: Grocer

William Morrison Gunn (19 April 1895 – 9 April 1970) was a member of the Queensland Legislative Assembly.

== Biography ==
Gunn was born at Mackay, Queensland, the son of the William Gunn and his wife Mary (née McLeod). He was educated at Brisbane, Gympie, and Laidley before joining the 1st AIF at the start of World War I. He was stationed with the 2nd Light Horse Brigade and saw action in Gallipoli and Palestine and in April 1917 promoted to sergeant.

In the same month as his promotion, Gunn was shot in the head and left elbow by opposing forces near Gaza. He was found to have a fractured skull and was put on the dangerously ill list. He was deemed unfit for fighting and returned home in May 1917. After his return he was a grocer at Wynnum.

On 29 October 1921 Gunn married Edith Annie Curtis (died 1971) and together had a son and a daughter. He died at Manly in April 1970.

== Public life ==
At the 1944 Queensland state election, Gunn, for the Labor Party, won the seat of Wynnum, defeating the sitting member, Bill Dart. He held Wynnum for 22 years before retiring at the 1966 Queensland state election,

Preceded by Bill Dart	Member for Wynnum; 1944–1966	Succeeded by Edward Harris
