= James Bayley (politician) =

Australian politician (1882–1968)

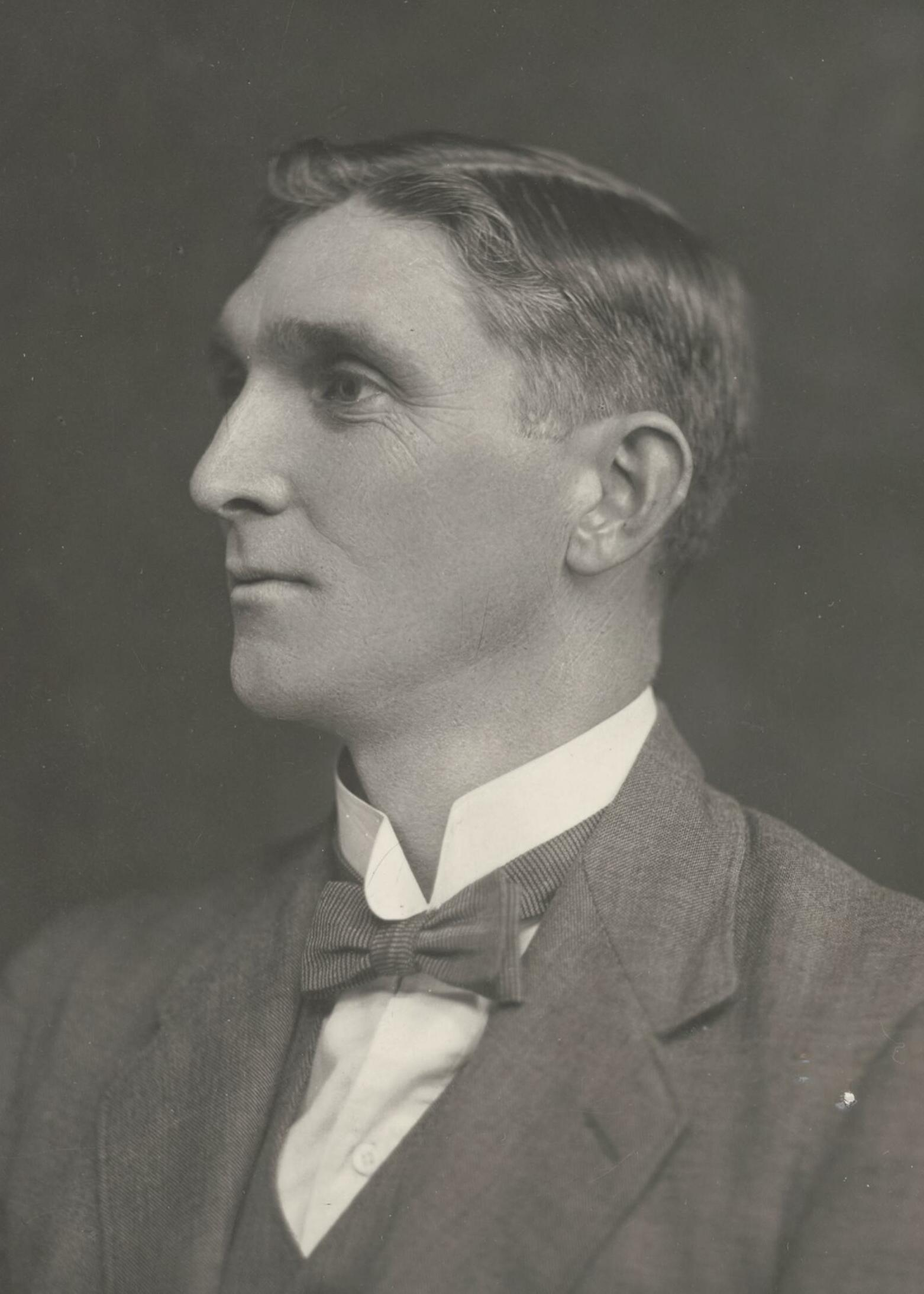

Member of the Australian Parliament for Oxley
- In office 5 May 1917 – 19 December 1931
- Preceded by: James Sharpe
- Succeeded by: Francis Baker

Member of the Queensland Legislative Assembly for Wynnum
- In office 29 April 1933 – 10 May 1935
- Preceded by: Walter Barnes
- Succeeded by: John Donnelly

Personal details
- Born: James Garfield Bayley; 26 March 1882 Franklin, Tasmania, Australia
- Died: 14 January 1968 (aged 85) Brisbane, Queensland, Australia
- Party: Nationalist Party of Australia
- Other political affiliations: Country and Progressive National Party
- Spouse: Gladys Thelma Grier
- Relations: Irene Longman (sister); Percy Bayley (brother)
- Education: Stanford University
- Occupation: Teacher

James Garfield Bayley (26 March 1882 – 14 January 1968) was an Australian politician. He was a Nationalist Party member of the Australian House of Representatives from 1917 to 1931 and a Country and Progressive National Party member of the Queensland Legislative Assembly from 1933 to 1935.

== Early life and teaching career ==
Bayley was born in Franklin, Tasmania and was educated at Leichhardt Superior Public School in Sydney, but moved with his family to Brisbane in 1895, where he won a scholarship to attend Brisbane Grammar School. He did his teacher training at South Brisbane and was transferred to Toowoomba as an assistant teacher before resigning from the Education Department in 1904 to further his studies in the United States. He received a diploma from the California State Teachers Training College at San Jose and became principal of a school in Fresno County in central California before resigning to attend Stanford University, where he received his bachelor's and master's degrees. He returned to Australia and was appointed principal at Charters Towers State High School in December 1911. He unsuccessfully contested Oxley at the 1914 federal election.

== Political career ==
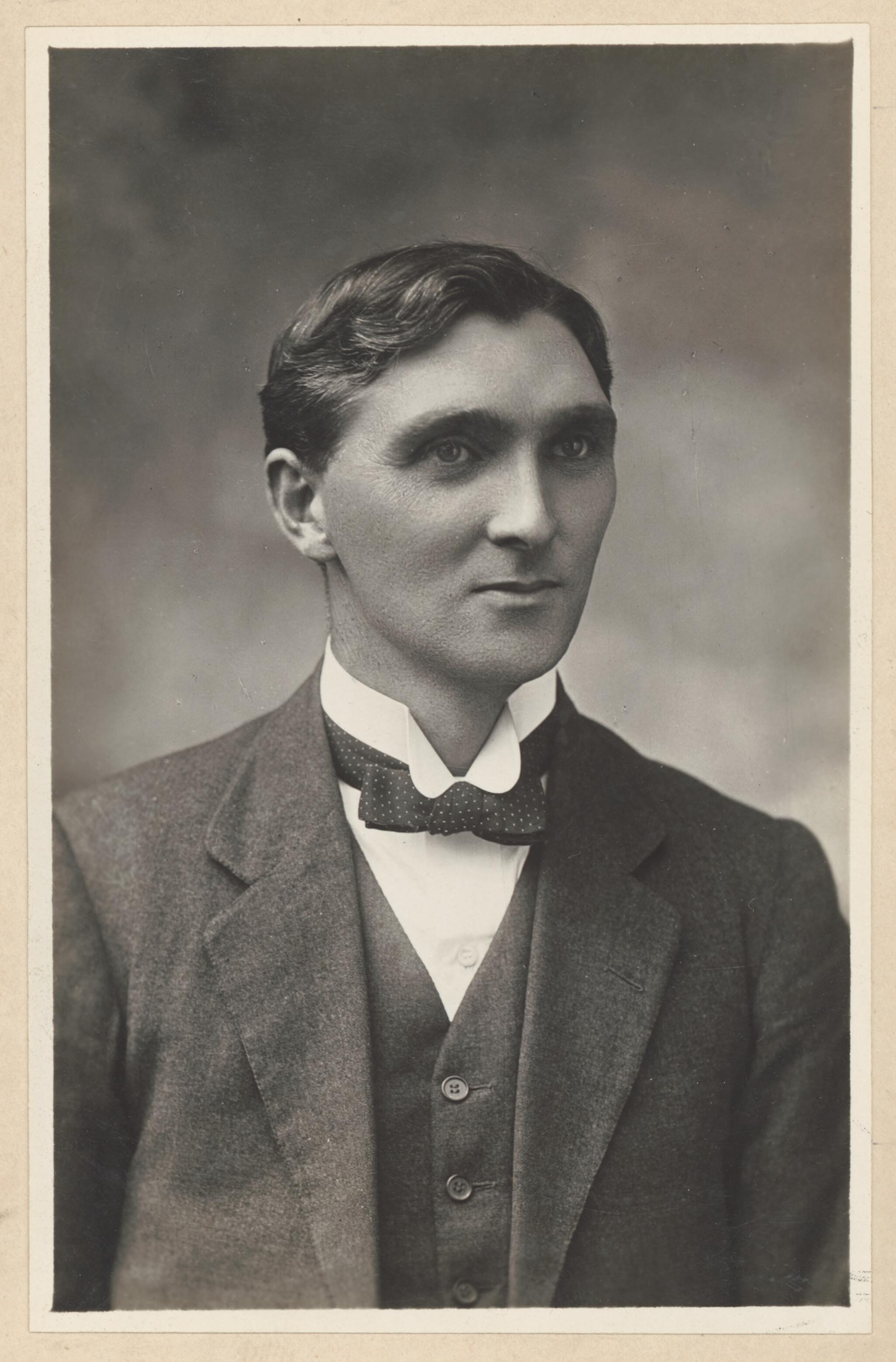
Bayley c. 1920

In 1917, Bayley was elected to the Australian House of Representatives as the Nationalist member for Oxley. In federal parliament, he was a member of the Joint Committee on Public Accounts from 1920 to 1926 and its chairman from 1923 to 1926. He was chairman of committees from 1926 to 1929 and then opposition whip and secretary of the Nationalist Party from 1929 until his 1931 defeat. He lost his seat to a Labor candidate at the 1931 federal election.

He was then elected to the Legislative Assembly of Queensland in a May 1933 by-election following the death of Country and Progressive National Party MP Walter Barnes, retaining the seat for the party. However, he was defeated at the 1935 state election. In January 1936, he was appointed secretary to the Northern Australia Geophysical and Geological Survey for a two-year period.

In 1936, he unsuccessfully contested United Australia Party preselection for the Darling Downs federal by-election that year and for the Senate at the 1937 federal election. In 1943, he unsuccessfully contested the 1943 federal election as an independent in the New South Wales seat of Newcastle, during which time he listed his occupation as "retired".

== Later life ==
In 1941, he was appointed to the role of Press Censorship Authority by the Menzies government. In 1947, Bayley was appointed Commonwealth Appeal Censor, having what was essentially the final say on appeals from the Film Censorship Board. He held the role until 1956. As Appeal Censor, he confirmed the ban on Roberto Rossellini's film The Miracle, but overturned a ban on the film adaptation of the Chinese play The White Haired Girl as long as "politically objectionable" scenes were removed.

== Personal life ==
Bayley died in 1968 in Brisbane.

His sister, Irene Longman, was the first woman to be elected to the Queensland Parliament, while his brother, Percy Bayley, was also a state MP for Pittsworth.

Parliament of Australia
Preceded by James Sharpe	Member for Oxley; 1917–1931	Succeeded by Francis Baker
Parliament of Queensland
Preceded by Walter Barnes	Member for Wynnum; 1933–1935	Succeeded by John Donnelly
