= Electoral district of Wynnum =

Former state electoral district of Queensland, Australia

Wynnum Queensland—Legislative Assembly
- State: Queensland
- Created: 1923
- Abolished: 1986
- Namesake: Wynnum, Queensland
- Coordinates: 27°27′S 153°10′E

Wynnum was an electoral district of the Legislative Assembly in the Australian state of Queensland from 1923 to 1986.

The district was based in the eastern suburbs of Brisbane and named for the suburb of Wynnum.

== Members for Wynnum ==
The members for Wynnum were:

Member	Party	Term
Walter Barnes	National/United/CPNP	1923–1933
James Bayley	Country and Progressive National Party	1933–1935
John Donnelly	Labor Party	1935–1938
Bill Dart	United Australia Party	1938–1944
Bill Gunn	Labor Party	1944–1966
Ted Harris	Labor Party	1966–1974
Bill Lamond	Country Party/National Party	1974–1977
Eric Shaw	Labor Party	1977–1986
