= Richard Edwards (Australian politician) =

Australian politician

The Honourable Richard Edwards
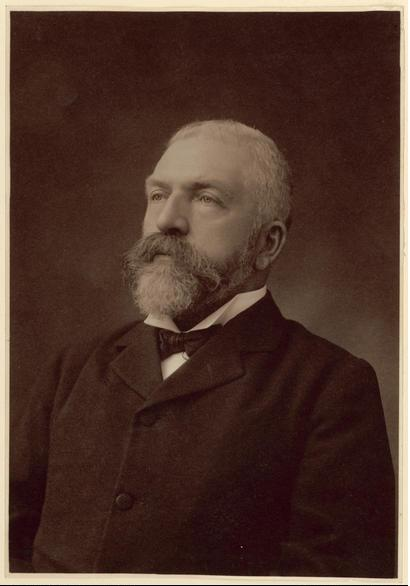

Member of the Australian Parliament for Oxley
- In office 30 March 1901 – 23 April 1913
- Preceded by: New seat
- Succeeded by: James Sharpe

Personal details
- Born: 1842 Montgomeryshire, Wales
- Died: 29 October 1915 (aged 72–73) Brisbane, Queensland
- Party: Protectionist (1901–1906); Anti-Socialist (1906–1909); Liberal (1909–1913)
- Occupation: Businessman

Richard Edwards (1842 – 29 October 1915) was an Australian politician. He was a Member of the Australian House of Representatives.

== Early life ==
Richard Edwards was born in 1842 in Montgomeryshire, Wales. He migrated to Australia in 1862, becoming first a goldminer in Victoria and then a shopkeeper in Brisbane. He invested in both sugar and newspapers. Elizabeth Munro Edwards (née Gibson) was born in Scotland on 11 May 1840 and came to Australia with her parents, Thomas Gibson and Christina Thompson in 1864. Three years later she married Richard. Interested in politics also, she hosted the first women's suffrage league in Brisbane in 1889, and was appointed as the Government representative to a Royal Commission on working conditions in Shops and Factories. She was active in the Early Closing Movement.

== Politics ==
In the first federal election in 1901, Edwards was elected to the Australian House of Representatives as the member for Oxley. Although there was no protectionist organisation in Queensland, he described himself as such and sat with the Protectionist Party in Parliament. In 1906, he defected to the Anti-Socialist Party and, after the fusion of the Protectionist Party and the Anti-Socialist Party in 1909, he was a Liberal member.

== Later life ==
He retired from politics in 1913, due to ailing health, becoming a businessman, publisher and philanthropist. Elizabeth Edwards died in 1914 after a long illness.

Edwards died at his residence, "Bryntirion", on Wickham Terrace, on 29 October 1915. He was buried in Toowong Cemetery.

== Legacy ==
His drapery store, the Edwards and Chapman Building in Queen Street, Brisbane is now listed on the Queensland Heritage Register.

His residence, Bryntirion, is also listed on the Queensland Heritage Register.

Parliament of Australia
Preceded by New seat	Member for Oxley; 1901–1913	Succeeded by James Sharpe
