= Gerry Donnelly =

Australian rules footballer and coach

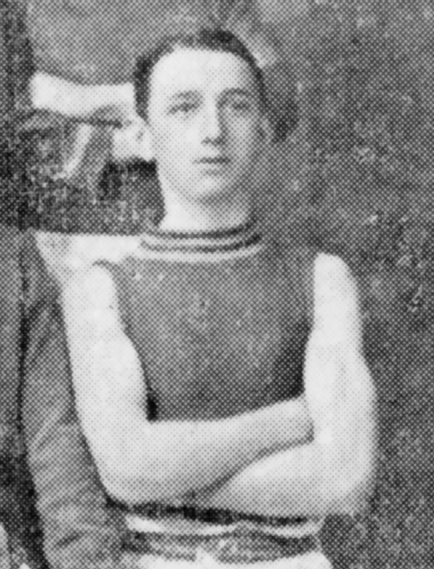

Personal information
- Full name: Gerald Vincent Donnelly
- Born: 7 August 1903; West Melbourne, Victoria
- Died: 4 September 1937 (aged 34); Fitzroy, Victoria
- Original team: St Patrick's (Albury)
- Height: 183 cm (6 ft 0 in)
- Weight: 80 kg (176 lb)
- Position: Wingman

Playing career^{1}
Years	Club	Games (Goals)
1924	Sturt	13 (16)
1925	Melbourne	12 (4)
1926, 1930	North Melbourne	14 (5)
1930	Essendon	3 (0)
Total		42 (25)

Coaching career
Years	Club	Games (W–L–D)
1926	North Melbourne	14 (0–13–1)
- ^{1} Playing statistics correct to the end of 1930.

Gerald Vincent Donnelly (7 August 1903 – 4 September 1937) was an Australian rules footballer who played for Melbourne, North Melbourne and Essendon in the Victorian Football League (VFL).

== Early life ==
Donnelly, nicknamed Gerry, grew up in West Melbourne, Victoria, the second son of Andrew and Mary Donnelly, and had two brothers and four sisters. He began his education at St Mary's Primary School, West Melbourne before going on to St. Joseph's Christian Brothers' College, North Melbourne where he stayed until 1919. During his teenage years he performed in a number of local concerts as he had a fine singing voice. While at school he also became a very good athlete and in 1919 was part of the St. Joseph's senior football squad along with Ray Brew. His older brother was Andy Donnelly who played twelve games with Essendon between 1920 and 1921.

== Football ==
After leaving school Donnelly trained with Essendon Juniors before going to South Australia where he played with the senior squad of Sturt Football Club. In 1925 he returned to Victoria and his career in a senior league came to prominence at Melbourne Football Club where he played as wingman. That same year he was chosen to represent the Victorian interstate team. Towards the end of the 1925 season he had his playing permit cancelled after it was decided by the League Investigations Committee that he was residentially bound to North Melbourne.

== Coaching ==
Donnelly crossed to North Melbourne Football Club in 1926 and after three games Wels Eicke resigned as captain-coach. Donnelly at the age of 22 became the youngest person ever to be a captain-coach in VFL history. He coached for 14 games that year. Although he failed to register a win he did lead North Melbourne to a controversial draw with Hawthorn Football Club in Round 13. Hawthorn were leading by a point when the bell sounded but Donnelly, who was running with the ball at the time, kicked a behind to level the scores. As the umpires had not heard the bell the point stood.

=== Country Football ===
Donnelly lined up with St Patricks in the Ovens And Murray Football League in 1927 and the team won the premiership. In 1928 he was appointed captain-coach of the club but they lost the Grand final. In 1929 he went to Hamilton as captain-coach but he suffered an eye injury that stopped him from playing. Recovering in Melbourne, Essendon enquired about his services but North Melbourne would not clear him.

Donnelly spent the summer training with Essendon but North refused to transfer him. After playing two senior games for the Kangaroos and several in the reserves North finally relented and Donnelly became a Bomber as clearances close on 30 June 1930. Donnelly played three senior games with Essendon.

== Death ==
On 4 September 1937, Donnelly died at St. Vincent's Hospital, Melbourne at the relatively young age of 34 from illness, and was interred on 6 September at Coburg Cemetery. He married Mollie 'Marie' Corcoran who survived him.
