= Doug Reynolds =

Doug Reynolds may refer to:

- Doug Reynolds (footballer) (1933–2026), Australian rules footballer
- Doug Reynolds (politician) (born 1976), West Virginia politician
