= Frank McManus (Australian politician) =

Australian politician

Frank McManus CMG
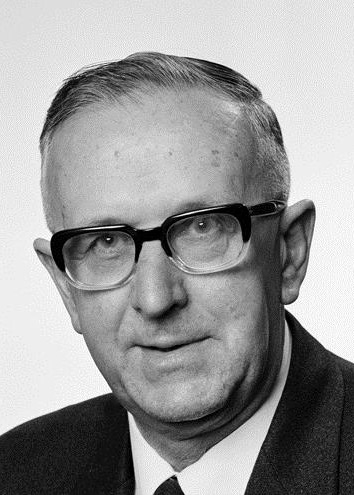

Leader of the Democratic Labor Party
- In office 10 October 1973 – 18 May 1974
- Deputy: Jack Little
- Preceded by: Vince Gair
- Succeeded by: party representation ceased

Deputy Leader of the Democratic Labor Party
- In office 8 May 1956 – 10 October 1973
- Leader: George Cole; Vince Gair
- Preceded by: office established
- Succeeded by: Jack Little

Senator for Victoria
- In office 1 July 1956 – 30 June 1962
- Preceded by: Charles Sandford
- Succeeded by: Magnus Cormack
- In office 1 July 1965 – 18 May 1974
- Preceded by: George Hannan
- Succeeded by: Jean Melzer

Personal details
- Born: Francis Patrick Vincent McManus; 27 February 1905 North Melbourne, Victoria
- Died: 28 December 1983 (aged 78) Melbourne, Victoria
- Party: Democratic Labor Party
- Occupation: Unionist

Francis Patrick Vincent McManus CMG (27 February 1905 – 28 December 1983) was an Australian politician, the last leader of the parliamentary Democratic Labor Party, and a prominent figure in Australian politics for 30 years.

== Early life ==
McManus was born in North Melbourne, into a working-class family of Irish Catholic background. He was one of three boys to Patrick, a wagon driver and Gertrude his wife. He was educated at Christian Brothers schools, including St Mary's Primary School, West Melbourne, St. Joseph's, CBC North Melbourne (1918–1922), and St Kevin's College, Melbourne. Following his secondary schooling, and with the assistance of a scholarship, he attended Newman College at the University of Melbourne where he graduated with a Bachelor of Arts(Honors) and Diploma of Education which allowed him to become a school teacher. Later he became an official in the Victorian Department of Education.

== Political life ==
In 1950 McManus was appointed Assistant State Secretary of the Australian Labor Party. The Victorian Branch of the party was then under the control of right-wing forces aligned with B. A. Santamaria's secretive anti-communist "Movement." In this position McManus supported the Industrial Groups which the party had set up within trade unions to combat the influence of the Communist Party of Australia.

After Labor's defeat in the 1954 federal election, the federal Leader, Dr H. V. Evatt, publicly blamed the Victorian Branch and Santamaria's "Movement" for the defeat, causing a split in the Branch between pro- and anti-Evatt factions which eventually split the whole party. McManus along with hundreds of other "Groupers" was expelled from Labor. They formed the Australian Labor Party (Anti-Communist), which eventually became the Democratic Labor Party (DLP).

McManus was elected to the Senate at the 1955 federal election as an ALP (Anti-Communist) candidate, whose ticket polled 17.8 percent of the vote in Victoria. He was defeated in 1961, but re-elected in 1964, and again in 1970. At the 1970 election, campaigning on the slogan "Vote Mac Back", he polled 19.1 percent, the DLP's best-ever result.

In the Senate, the DLP had between one and five Senators between 1955 and 1974, led first by George Cole of Tasmania and then by Vince Gair of Queensland, with McManus as Deputy Leader. The DLP gave critical support to the Liberal governments of Robert Menzies and his successors, pressing them to adopt more militantly anti-communist policies both domestically and internationally, particularly on issues such as the Vietnam War and the recognition of the People's Republic of China believing there was a real threat from communist domination. They also supported conservative Catholic views on social issues. On some issues, such as pensions, the DLP supported traditional Labor policies.

In 1973, following the election of the Whitlam Labor government, Gair was forced out as DLP Leader and was succeeded by McManus, who at 68 was only three years younger than Gair. The election of Whitlam had robbed the DLP of most of its influence, and Gair's acceptance of the post of Ambassador to Ireland from Whitlam split the party and caused a collapse in its support. In 1974 the DLP supported the Liberal leader, Billy Snedden, in threatening to block the Whitlam government's budget bills in the Senate.

When Whitlam responded by immediately calling an election for both the House and Senate (a double dissolution), McManus informed the Victorian Central Executive that Billy Snedden had agreed to the Liberals running a joint Senate ticket with the DLP, which would have guaranteed him a winnable Senate spot. But this joint ticket did not eventuate, and all the DLP Senators lost their seats, McManus polling only 6.4 percent in Victoria.

== Later life ==
McManus ran for the Senate again at the 1975 election following the fall of the Whitlam government, but was not elected, his vote falling to 5.8 percent. In 1976 he resigned as leader and the party was wound up in 1978.

He was made a Companion of the Order of St Michael and St George (CMG) in 1979.

He died in Melbourne in 1983 leaving a wife and four children.
