= St Augustine's College, Yarraville =

- Yarraville, Victoria; Australia

Information
- Type: Boys secondary
- Motto: Latin: Sursum Corda (Lift up your Hearts)
- Established: 1942
- Founder: Christian Brothers
- Status: Closed
- Closed: 1972
- Enrolment: Peaked at around 500 in the early 1960s
- Colours: purple, green, gold
- Affiliations: Catholic Church, Congregation of Christian Brothers

St. Augustine's College was an Australian Roman Catholic secondary college in Yarraville, Victoria. Also known as Christian Brothers' College, Yarraville, or more simply CBC Yarraville, the school for boys opened in 1942, closed in 1972, and was operated by the Congregation of Christian Brothers.

== Early history ==
The school owes its early beginnings to the opening of St. Augustine's primary school in 1895. This early school was operated by the Sisters of St. Joseph, who, guided by the charism of Mary Mackillop, wished to help the poor of the area. At that time the wooden church building served a dual purpose as a school on weekdays, for nearly 200 pupils, and a place of worship on Sundays. In 1896 the school was led by Sister Casimir and the nuns and their assistants taught mixed classes of boys and girls and it was not until much later that classes were strictly segregated.

By 1930 around 900 students were being taught in the Parish school and the need to build more classrooms was increasing. In 1941 a separate girls school was opened within the parish complex and the need to cater for the boys became obvious.

== 1940s–1950s ==
The Christian Brothers arrived in 1942 to take charge of the classes for boys. They adopted a modified version of the existing Congregational crest used by the Brothers to identify themselves.

In 1946 the school enrolment stood at 240 boys in Grades 5 to 8, also known as Proficiency. The following year the school added a First Year Intermediate class to its curriculum. The names of some of the early headmasters include Br. H. Boylan, Br. E. S. Crowle (1946–1952) and Br. R. McCartney. A new residence was opened for the Brothers on Somerville Road in March 1949 but up until that time they travelled daily from the Brothers community at St. Joseph's North Melbourne by train to the Yarraville railway station.

== Closure ==
The Christian Brothers' college closed in 1972, later to be reopened as an extension of St. Augustines Primary school. Following the withdrawal of the Brothers, the Avoca Street Campus was taken over by the Sisters of St Joseph who proceeded to operate the site as an extension of their Altona West school, Mount St. Joseph Girls' College. The handball courts and the ground floor class rooms of the other site were incorporated into the St Augustine's Primary School which had continued its operation on an adjoining site while the upstairs classrooms were incorporated into Mount St Joseph's campus.

Following a review by the Sisters of St Joseph in 1975 it was decided that the campus was superfluous to their needs and this led to the opening of Yarraville Catholic Girls College.

== Recognition ==
The school was particularly recognised in the city of Melbourne for the strength of its sporting teams, and the sportsmen it produced. For example, six members of the 1954 VFL premiership team (the Footscray Bulldogs) were old boys of St. Augustine's, including Doug Reynolds and Ted Whitten.

== Notable alumni ==
- Brian William Buckley – Musician, journalist and footballer
- Terence John Higgins – Chief Justice of the Australian Capital Territory
- Doug Reynolds – Footscray Football Club player
- Ted Whitten – Footscray Football Club player
- Brian Barnett OAM – Was awarded the Order of Australia in 2013 for a lifetime of work with conservation and the environment, in particular Australian reptiles.
- John Gosling OAM – awarded for his work with guide dog training over 50 years.
- Barry Jones OAM – awarded for his service to the RSL and veterans.
- David Bullard OBE, RFD, Ed, LLB – a lawyer and barrister and past Chairman of Odyssey House and RACV

== Bibliography ==
- St. Augustine's CBC Yarraville, Old Boys' Association – 40 Year Memories (Brothers Information Technology Services: Melbourne, 2004)
