= St Ambrose's School, Brunswick =

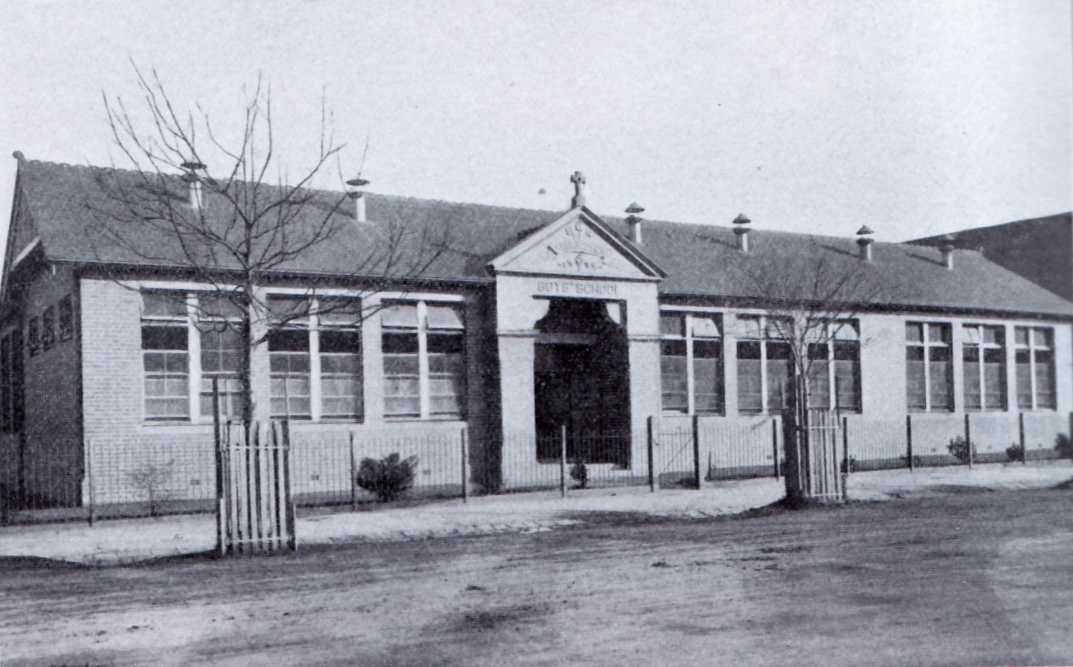
- Street view of the school building located in Dawson Street, Brunswick
- Brunswick, Victoria; Australia

Information
- Type: Independent
- Denomination: Catholic Church
- Established: c. 1885
- Status: Closed
- Closed: 2008
- Grades: 1–8

St Ambrose's School, Brunswick was a Roman Catholic primary school located in Brunswick, Victoria, a suburb of Melbourne and was part of a parish complex which included a church, a hall and a school for boys and one for girls each using the same or similar school name. The school was active between c. 1885 until its closure in 2008.

== History ==
Following the discovery of gold in Victoria in the 1850s and the granting of statehood to the Colony, the population of Melbourne rose quickly from 177 at the time of settlement in 1836 to 80,000 in 1854 and just seven years later that figure had risen to 140,000. The needs of the ever-expanding population led to the establishment of places of worship, hospitals and schools.

The suburb of Brunswick was no different and a school building, part of the St Ambrose Church complex, costing £1000 was completed by the middle of 1885 and opened formally around that time. This building later became the St. Ambrose's Hall.

In 1890 St. Ambrose's was declared a Parish in its own right led by Father Luby. The school enrolment had increased to 330 and the need for finances to expand the services offered by the parish was rising.

By 1906 the total school enrolment had risen to 1021 students and around £6000 had been spent in the preceding 16 years. Since 1899 the school had been led by Charles Xavier O'Driscoll. When O'Driscoll resigned in 1911 he went on to become Inspector of Catholic Schools for the region.

== The girls school ==
St Ambrose's Girls' School began operating in the original church building and the curriculum included singing, drawing and French. By 1906 the running of the school had been taken over by the Sisters of Mercy. The Sisters travelled along Sydney Road from their convent in North Coburg daily and in 1913 Sister Mary Claver was head of the girls school. Around 1922 the daily average attendance had risen to 500 pupils.

== The boys school ==
In the early years the boys shared the same building with the girls but were still being taught by lay teachers in 1906. In 1917 a new building, costing £4000, was formally opened a short distance from the church itself. Also known as St. Ambrose's Boys School, Brunswick, members of the Congregation of Christian Brothers taught the boys and assumed control of this school. At the time of opening it had an enrolment of 300, its first headmaster was Bro. Keniry.

The boys school continued to be assisted by the Christian Brothers for some time as they had also established St Joseph's CBC North Melbourne in the neighbouring suburb of North Melbourne. St Joseph's was to become the residence of the teaching Brothers serving St Mary's Primary School, West Melbourne, St Joseph's and St George's School in Carlton, and for a time, St. Ambrose's.

== Later years ==
St Ambrose's School closed at the end of 2008 with the local parish children now attending Our Lady Help of Christians Primary School. Of the original school buildings only St. Ambrose's Hall and St. Ambrose's Community Centre remain in parish hands. Both these buildings were once used as a school.

== Notable alumni ==
- Lt. Henry Noel Boyle – WW1, wounded in action during Gallipoli Campaign, also served in WW2
- Cpl. John Terrence Clarke – WW1, severely wounded in action
- Pvt. Thomas Conroy 14th. Bn. – WW1, killed in action during Gallipoli Campaign
- Claude Curtin – Australian rules football
- John Curtin – Past Prime Minister of Australia
- Lt. John James Daley – WW1, awarded Military Cross, Dux of school
- Pvt. Edward Patrick Dorian – WW2, prisoner of war
- Maurie Johnson – Australian rules football
- Joseph Leslie O'Rourke – WW1
- Bob Santamaria – Social commentator
- Pvt. Christopher Tomlinson (alias Sauer) – WW2, wounded in action
- Drv. Francis Tyrrell – WW2, Killed in action
