= St George's School, Carlton =

Location
- 180 Drummond Street, Carlton, Victoria, Australia
- 37°48′9″S 144°58′7″E

Information
- Type: Independent
- Denomination: Roman Catholic
- Established: circa 1855
- Grades: 1–8

St George's School, Carlton was a Catholic Church school located in Carlton, a suburb of Melbourne and was part of a parish complex which included a church, a hall and a school for boys and one for girls each using the same or similar school name. The school and church opened around May 1856 and operated from a bluestone building which served as both church and school. It was considered a fine example of one of the earliest parish schools established in Melbourne.

== History ==
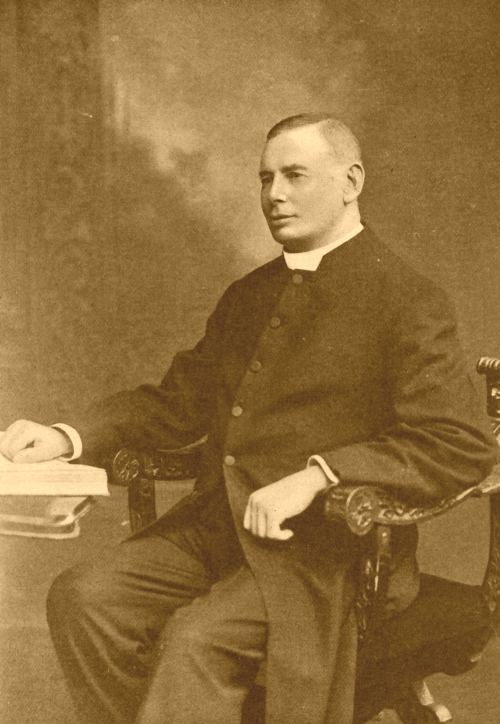
J.H. O'Connell, Parish Priest of St. George's for 40 years

Following the discovery of gold in Victoria in the 1850s and the granting of statehood to the Colony, the population of Melbourne rose quickly from 177 at the time of settlement in 1836 to 80,000 in 1854 and just seven years later that figure had risen to 140,000. The needs of the ever-expanding population led to the establishment of places of worship, hospitals and schools.

Over the years 1855 and 1856 a simple single aisled bluestone church, consisting of a nave and tower, was constructed on land granted to the Catholic Church in Carlton. This building, known as St George's, Carlton, was to serve a dual purpose as a church on Sundays and a school during weekdays and remained in use as a school for many years. In 1866 a transept was added to the church to cater for the expanding local population and its children. James Hennessy O'Connell was made pastor to the parish in 1881 and began raising funds to expand the complex which later included the erection of a new church, the Church of the Sacred Heart in 1899, new school buildings and a hall.

Prior to the formal opening of the church in 1856, a small school, known as St. George's, operated from a nearby house. In the early years the children of St George's parish were taught by Catholic lay teachers and were mostly segregated into classes for boys, taught by males, and girls taught by women. Classes were under the charge of a teacher who had received their training and certification overseas, to a large extent in Ireland. These 'head' teachers were supported by one or two assistants and came under the auspices of the Parish priest. In 1857 the school enrolment totalled over 120 boys and girls; rising to 349 in 1870 and then to 579 in 1892. The first boy enrolled was William Levers who later became a member of local government.

The period 1883 to 1884 saw the erection of a community hall and new schoolroom on the south-east corner of the site which was used by the girls school. The old church building was reconstructed solely for use as a boys school in 1897 when nearby St Brigid's church commenced services and in 1913 St. George's Infant School was established.

Disaster struck in November 1924 when the original church building was guttered by fire. Although much of the roof had gone new rooms were constructed from what remained of the walls and after this point was used solely as a school.

== The girls school ==
St George's Girls' School Carlton began operating in the original church building around 1856 and Mrs B. Hooper was the leading teacher followed by Mrs Fitzgerald in 1881. The roll call for 1892 includes the names of 315 girls and the curriculum included singing, drawing and French.

The Sisters of Charity, a religious order of nuns, took control of the girls school in 1897 and remained there until its closure. The need for more facilities continued to increase and pressure was placed on Thomas Carr (archbishop of Melbourne) at the time to provide the necessary funds to build and furnish a school for girls. Eventually a new school was constructed, comprising three classrooms, and the old building was adapted as a hall.

== The boys school ==
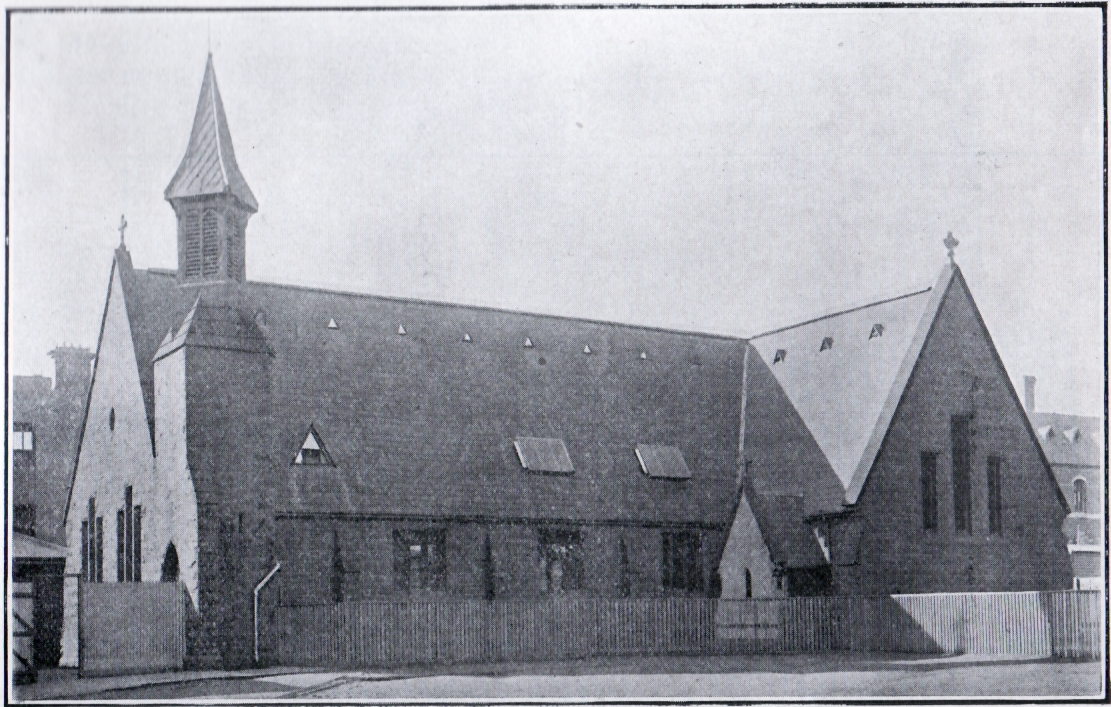
The original St. George's church with added transept

St George's Boys' School shared the old stone church, come school, with the girls from 1856 and Mr James Donovan was their teacher. The early school was staffed by Catholic laymen who gave their time to helping the Catholic poor, destitute and orphans. Donovan was followed by Mr Hickey in 1862, Mr Reidy in 1881 and Mr D. Buckley in 1885 and by 1892 over 260 boys were enrolled in the school. A cadet unit, Company E of No.12 Victorian Battalion, was established around 1890 and sports had become an intrinsic part of the curriculum.

In 1902 teachers from the Congregation of Christian Brothers took control of the boys section which operated from the reconstructed church building. It continued to be conducted by the Christian Brothers for some time as they had also established St Joseph's CBC North Melbourne in the neighbouring suburb of North Melbourne. St Joseph's was to become the residence of the teaching Brothers serving St Mary's Primary School, West Melbourne, St Joseph's and St George's School in Carlton. The first two Christian Brothers to teacher at Carlton were Bros. Patrick Barnabus Lee and William Emilian Staunton.

== Later years ==
The Junior School of the Academy of Mary Immaculate was located at the primary school site in Pelham Street in 1986. The site was refurbished and ten years later the girls from the academy relocated back to the Nicholson Street campus. In 2000 the site was taken over as a seminary for priests and became known as Corpus Christi College, Melbourne. Of the original buildings only the 1856 building, now used as a chapel, the new church and presbytery remain.

== Alumni ==
- Bill Barry – Victorian State Politician
- Matthew Beovich – Bishop
- Thomas Joseph Hawkins – Australian Naval administrator
- Thomas Francis Holland – Killed in action during WW1
- William Levers – Local councillor
- Nick McKenna – Federal Government Politician
- Jack Purtell – Jockey (Australian Racing Hall of Fame)
- Thomas Patrick Ryan – Killed in action during WW1
