= Vivian Creighton =

Vivian Rogers Creighton (19 November 1900 — 12 October 1975) was the chairman of the Land Administration Board (Queensland, Australia) 1953 to 1956,

== Biography ==
Creighton was employed by the Lands Department since 1923 when he was appointed as a Ranger. He was awarded an MBE for services during World War II and upon discharge in 1945 took up duties as a land commissioner. He was appointed to the Land Administration Board in 1952 and became chairman of the board in 1953.

Creighton was controversially dismissed by the Gair Labor Government in August 1956 for making public certain information concerning Government conduct. This information concerned allegations that the Government had demanded payments from pastoralists in order to ensure the extension of pastoral leases, and that these payments had been diverted to Labor Party funds. The information was the main cause of a Royal Commission that resulted in the then Lands Minister (Tom Foley) losing his post.

Creighton appeared before Parliament on 2 August 1956 to provide the reasons for his decision to divulge the information, stating:

I decided after much thought that it was my responsibility to bring into the open such matters in order that the whole position could be cleared. In this regard I decided that there was no duty upon me to give blind personal loyalty to my Minister. I know that I will be discharged of my office, but by doing so Parliament will not dishonour me, but will merely dishonour itself.

— Courier Mail 3 August 1956.

Creighton was subsequently reappointed to the department as Chief Valuer in 1957. He died on 12 October 1975 aged 74.
