= Andy Donnelly (Australian footballer) =

Australian rules footballer, born 1900

Personal information
- Full name: Andrew Francis Donnelly
- Born: 19 July 1900; West Melbourne, Victoria
- Died: 22 April 1964 (aged 63); Essendon, Victoria
- Original team: North Melbourne (VFA)

Playing career^{1}
Years	Club	Games (Goals)
1920–1921	Essendon	12 (0)
- ^{1} Playing statistics correct to the end of 1921.

Andrew Francis Donnelly (19 July 1900 – 22 April 1964) was an Australian rules footballer who played for the Essendon Football Club in the Victorian Football League (VFL).

Andy's younger brother was Gerry Donnelly.
