= Jack Egerton =

Australian trade unionist

Sir Jack Egerton

Alderman for Gold Coast City Council
- In office 1979–1985

President of Queensland Labor
- In office 1968–1976

President of the Queensland Trades and Labor Council
- In office 1967–1976

Secretary of the Queensland Boilermakers' Union
- In office 1943–1967

Personal details
- Born: March 11, 1918 Emerald, Queensland; Australia
- Died: December 21, 1998 (aged 80) Gold Coast, Queensland; Australia
- Party: Labor (1936–1976); Independent (1976–1985)
- Spouse: Moya Jones (m. 1940)
- Occupation: Union official
- Profession: Boilermaker

Sir John (Jack) Alfred Roy Egerton (11 March 1918 – 21 December 1998) was an Australian trade union official, politician and prominent member of the Australian Labor Party.

== Early life and career ==
Born in Emerald, Queensland, Egerton was educated at Rockhampton and Mount Morgan High Schools. He started his working life as a boilermaker (his father had also been a boilermaker). Very soon he turned to political activity, with marked success.

When only 25 years old Egerton became state secretary of the Queensland Boilermakers Union, and well before reaching the age of 40 he had become one of the leading figures in Queensland politics, as Vince Gair (ALP Premier since 1952) found to his cost in 1957. In addition to being president of the Queensland Trades and Labor Council from 1967 to 1976, Egerton served as president of the Australian Labor Party state executive for much of the same period (1968–76). Meanwhile, he held high rank in the Australian Council of Trade Unions and was a member of the ALP's federal executive.

During the 1970s, Egerton acted as Prime Minister Gough Whitlam's right-hand man in Queensland and frequently clashed with the state's conservative Premier Sir Joh Bjelke-Petersen.

== Jumping Jack scandal ==
In 1976 Egerton became one of the few Australian Labor Party members to accept a knighthood, in violation of the party's general principle to reject titular honours. His recent predecessors included William McKell (1951), Edward McTiernan (1951), Robert Cosgrove (1959), and Dorothy Tangney (1968). Exactly why Egerton broke with ALP tradition and accepted the honour was a question that he never publicly answered.

Malcolm Fraser, who had defeated Whitlam in a landslide at the December 1975 federal election, offered the knighthood to Egerton for service to the trade union movement. The award cost Egerton his ALP membership, and earned him the name of 'Jumping Jack the Black Knight', as well as prompting in some quarters the even more hostile epithet 'Labor Rat'. By odd coincidence, Egerton, the son of a boilermaker, received his knighthood from Governor-General Sir John Kerr, also the son of a boilermaker. An outraged Whitlam would later say the knighthood was "the most inappropriate conferral of the title since Queen Elizabeth I knighted Sir Toby Belch". Egerton's wife, Lady (Moya) Egerton had her ALP membership restored in 1977, but Sir Jack was never reinstated to the party.

== Later career ==
Egerton was later elected as an independent alderman of the Gold Coast City Council 1979 and served until his retirement in 1985. He was elected as Deputy Mayor of the Gold Coast for a time.

== Honours ==
- 12 June 1976 – (United Kingdom) Knight Bachelor (KB) | For services to the trade union movement
- Sir John (Jack) Egerton Park – A beachside public park in the Gold Coast suburb of Broadbeach is named in honour of Egerton

== Sources ==
=== Journal articles ===
- Bevis, Johannah (September 2015). "No more labour for the knight: An overview of Sir Jack Egerton's leadership". The Queensland Journal of Labour History (21): 4–15.
- Bowden, Bradley (November 2013). "Modern Labor in Queensland: Its Rise and Failings, 1978–98". Labour History (105): 1–26.

=== Other articles ===
- Sir Jack Egerton
