= Vince Gair =

Australian politician (1901–1980)

The Honourable Vince Gair
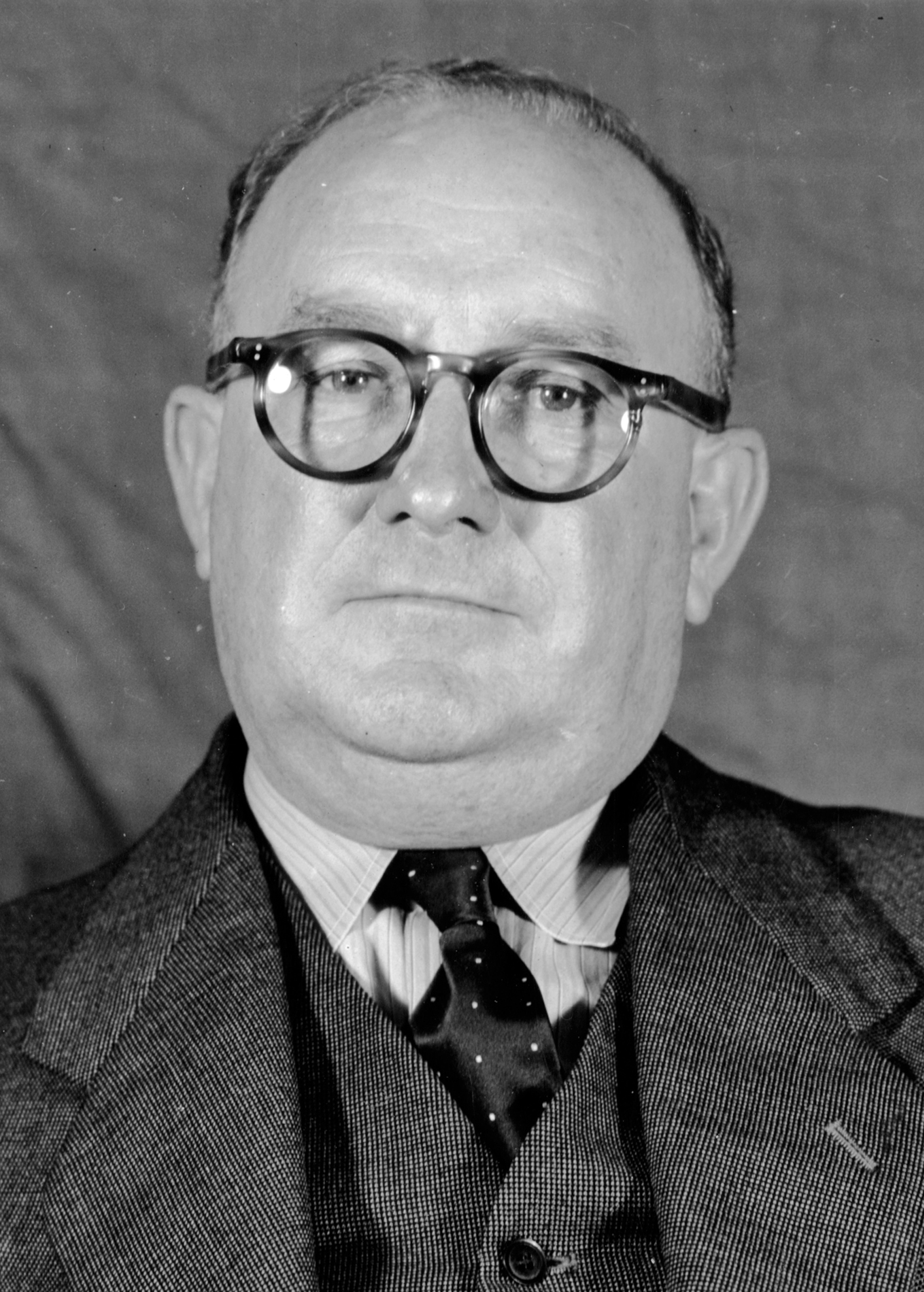
- Gair in 1953

27th Premier of Queensland
- In office 15 January 1952 – 12 August 1957; Acting: 15–23 January 1952
- Monarchs: George VI; Elizabeth II
- Governor: John Lavarack
- Deputy: Tom Foley; Jack Duggan; Ted Walsh
- Preceded by: Ned Hanlon
- Succeeded by: Frank Nicklin

Deputy Premier of Queensland
- In office 15 May 1947 – 17 January 1952
- Premier: Ned Hanlon
- Preceded by: Ted Walsh
- Succeeded by: Tom Foley

Treasurer of Queensland
- In office 10 May 1950 – 17 January 1952
- Premier: Ned Hanlon
- Preceded by: James Larcombe
- Succeeded by: Ted Walsh

Member of the Legislative Assembly for South Brisbane
- In office 11 June 1932 – 28 May 1960
- Preceded by: Neil MacGroarty
- Succeeded by: Col Bennett
Diplomatic posts
Australian Ambassador to Ireland
In office 2 May 1974 – 21 January 1976
Preceded by	Keith Brennan
Succeeded by	Brian Hill
Federal politics
Leader of the Democratic Labor Party
In office 23 June 1965 – 10 October 1973
Deputy	Frank McManus
Preceded by	George Cole
Succeeded by	Frank McManus
Senator for Queensland
In office 1 July 1965 – 11 April 1974
Preceded by	Ted Maher
Succeeded by	Kate Sullivan

Personal details
- Born: Vincent Clair Gair; 25 February 1901 Rockhampton, Queensland, Australia
- Died: 11 November 1980 (aged 79) South Brisbane, Queensland, Australia
- Resting place: Nudgee Cemetery
- Party: Labor
- Other political affiliations: Democratic Labor Party; Queensland Labor Party
- Spouse(s): Florence Glynn (1924–1929; her death); Ellen Sexton (1944–1980; his death)
- Occupation: Public servant, Ambassador

Vincent Clair Gair (25 February 1901 – 11 November 1980) was an Australian politician. He served as Premier of Queensland from 1952 until 1957, when his stormy relations with the trade union movement saw him expelled from the Labor Party. He was elected to the Australian Senate and led the Democratic Labor Party from 1965 to 1973. In 1974 he was appointed Australian Ambassador to Ireland by the Whitlam government, which caused his expulsion from the DLP.

== Early life ==
Gair was born in Rockhampton to John Alexander and Catherine Mary Gair, a Scottish father and an Irish mother, and raised a Catholic. His parents were founding members of the Labor Party in Queensland in the 1890s. He began work with the Department of Railways upon the family's move to Dutton Park, Queensland. In 1916 he joined the Labor Party. He married Florence Glynn in 1924. She died in an accident five years later.

== State parliamentary career ==
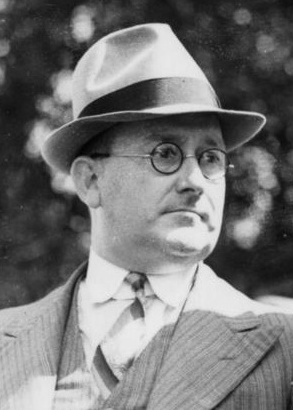
Gair in 1938

The Queensland state electorate of South Brisbane was held from 1929 to 1932 by Neil MacGroarty, Attorney-General in the government of Arthur Moore. MacGroarty was influential in creating the Mungana Royal Commission to destroy the political career of Ted Theodore, and reportedly incurred the displeasure of the Roman Catholic Archbishop of Brisbane, James Duhig.

Gair worked at consolidating his hold on the marginal electorate, at which he was largely successful except in the 1938 election, when a newly formed Protestant Labor Party targeted his seat. He fended off the challenge and retained a low profile in Parliament. In 1941, Gair's only daughter from his first marriage died. In 1944 he remarried, to Ellen Mary Sexton; the couple had two sons.

Gair was a backbencher for ten years during the William Forgan Smith government before being appointed as Secretary for Mines under the elderly Frank Cooper in 1942. The same year he became Minister for Labour and Employment (later Labour and Industry), and in 1947 he was elected by his colleagues as Deputy Premier. In 1950 he also became Treasurer. Gair had not previously held office in a trade union. Multiple Labor parliamentarians in Queensland in particular were closely aligned with the Australian Workers' Union (AWU). Premier Edward Hanlon was the first in a succession of Queensland premiers not to be linked with the AWU, and this fact helped bring about a reduction in the union's political influence.

In 1948, the Industrial Groups associated with the Catholic Movement of B. A. Santamaria were introduced into Queensland to combat the influence of the Communist Party of Australia in the trade unions. The Industrial Groups (whose members were known as Groupers) were supported by Gair, who hoped to use them to cement his personal power base within the party's organisational wing, as well as by union leader Joe Bukowski and the AWU. When conflict with the Groupers precipitated a national split in the ALP, leading to the formation of the breakaway Democratic Labor Party (DLP), the national organisation of the AWU swung its support behind ALP leader Dr H. V. Evatt and disbanded the Groups. This would later deprive Gair of a potential source of support within the party organisation. Hanlon died on 15 January 1952 and Gair, having been acting premier since the previous August, was elected by the ALP Caucus to succeed him on 17 January.

== Premier of Queensland ==
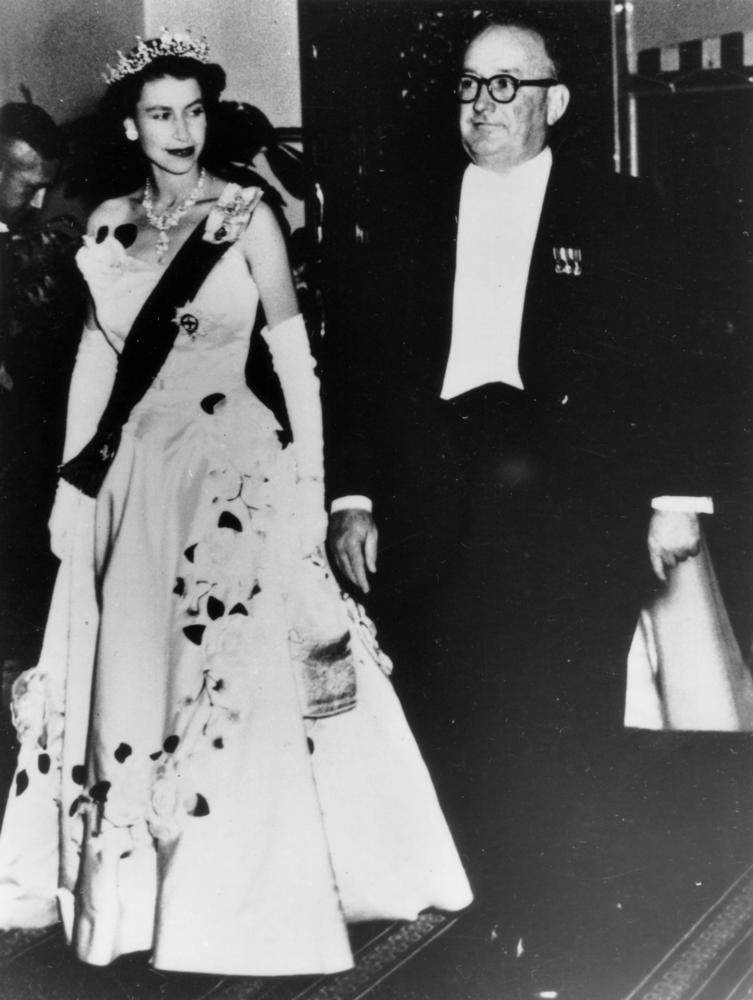
Gair in 1954 with Queen Elizabeth II.

Under Gair's premiership, reforms were carried out in worker's compensation, sick leave, and annual leave. Long-service leave was also introduced, while the government's price controls enabled workers in Queensland to enjoy the highest real wages (adjusted for prices) in Australia.

Gair came into conflict with Bukowski when the AWU in 1955 began making allegations that there was corruption in the process of granting and extending pastoral leases in the state. In July of that year, members of the AWU executive met Gair. According to an account they gave later, Gair promised them an inquiry, although Gair denied ever having promised any such thing. Bukowski publicly expressed a desire to appear before the Bar of Parliament to detail his allegations, in which he was supported by Frank Nicklin, then leader of the Opposition; but Gair defeated his motion in parliament.

In February 1956, Ian Wood, a Liberal Party Senator for Queensland, alleged that the government had demanded payments from pastoralists in order to ensure the extension of pastoral leases, and that these payments had been diverted to Labor Party funds. Gair immediately set up a royal commission, which resulted in the laying of criminal charges against Lands Minister Tom Foley. Foley was acquitted of the specific charges laid against him, but was found by the Royal Commission's report to be responsible for the improper solicitation of party donations, for which he was dismissed from cabinet and expelled from the Labor Party.

Gair discovered that the AWU had gained its information about the scandal from a senior public official, Vivian Creighton. Gair pressed for Creighton's resignation on the grounds of official misconduct. Creighton was summoned to appear before the Bar of Parliament to explain his actions but was later dismissed by cabinet. Gair easily won the elections of May 1956.

When the AWU uncharacteristically endorsed strike action by shearers, Gair raised the union movement's ire by negotiating with the federal government in order to secure the export of wool shorn by non-union labour. He was ultimately successful in a negotiated end to the strike, but the effect was to cement an unlikely anti-Gair alliance between the Queensland Trades and Labour Council (TLC) (represented by Boilermaker's Union secretary Jack Egerton) and the AWU.

Out of the several issues over which Gair and the union movement came into conflict, the most severe was the introduction of three weeks' paid leave to workers under state industrial awards. This had been part of the party's election platform since 1953. Gair announced in 1955 that although the state's finances did not permit the extension of annual leave, the government would extend entitlements to long service leave. This compromise was regarded as insufficient by both the TLC and the AWU, and in November they moved in the Queensland Branch's Central Executive that legislation introducing the leave be introduced by the parliamentary party.

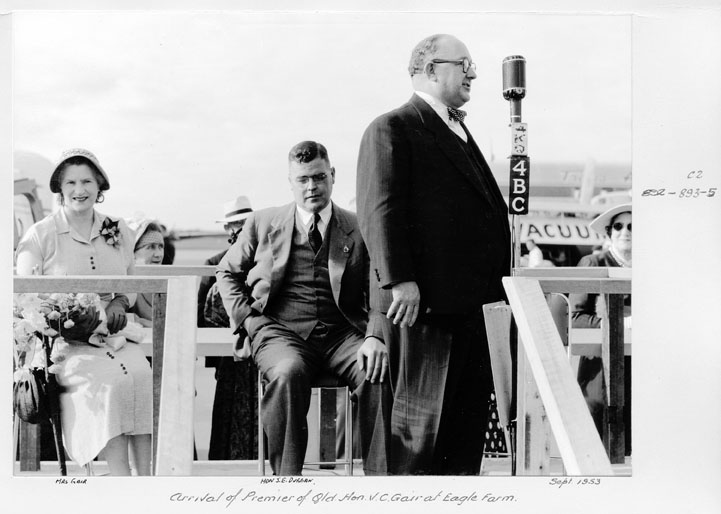
Gair delivering a speech in 1953.

The majority of Gair's Cabinet refused to accept what it saw as direction from the Central Executive, and in February 1956, Bukowski and Egerton organised the numbers at the next Labor Party convention to vote in favour of a leave increase. After private discussions it was revealed that Gair would introduce the leave sometime over the course of the year. After the election, however, State Treasurer Ted Walsh revealed that Queensland's budget was in deficit and Gair claimed that extending leave would be financially irresponsible.

The parliamentary ALP found itself in deadlock with the organisational wing and the trade unions, with the TLC and the Central Executive maintaining pressure on Gair throughout early 1957. Gair still refused to budge, thinking that the executive would not dare to expel him. For its part, the QCE did not believe that Gair would take many of his caucus with him. The QCE finally expelled Gair on 24 April. He took a total of 25 defectors from the ALP Caucus with him, including all the Cabinet except Deputy Premier Jack Duggan, to form the Queensland Labor Party (QLP). Gair tried to gain Country Party support, but talks with Nicklin broke down when federal Country Party leader Arthur Fadden (who was himself a Queenslander) told Nicklin that he had a chance to become Premier himself. On 12 June, the ALP, now led by Duggan, voted to deny "supply" (that is, the money needed to govern) to what was left of the Gair government. The Country-Liberal Coalition moved to block supply as well and brought the government down.

An election was called for 3 August, in which both the QLP and the ALP lost ground. The two Labor factions won only 31 seats between them to the Coalition's 42. Gair was re-elected at South Brisbane as a QLP candidate. Nicklin became Premier and for the first time in 25 years and only the second time since 1915, a Labor Government was out of office in Queensland. The ALP would not return to power in Queensland until 1989.

== Federal politics ==
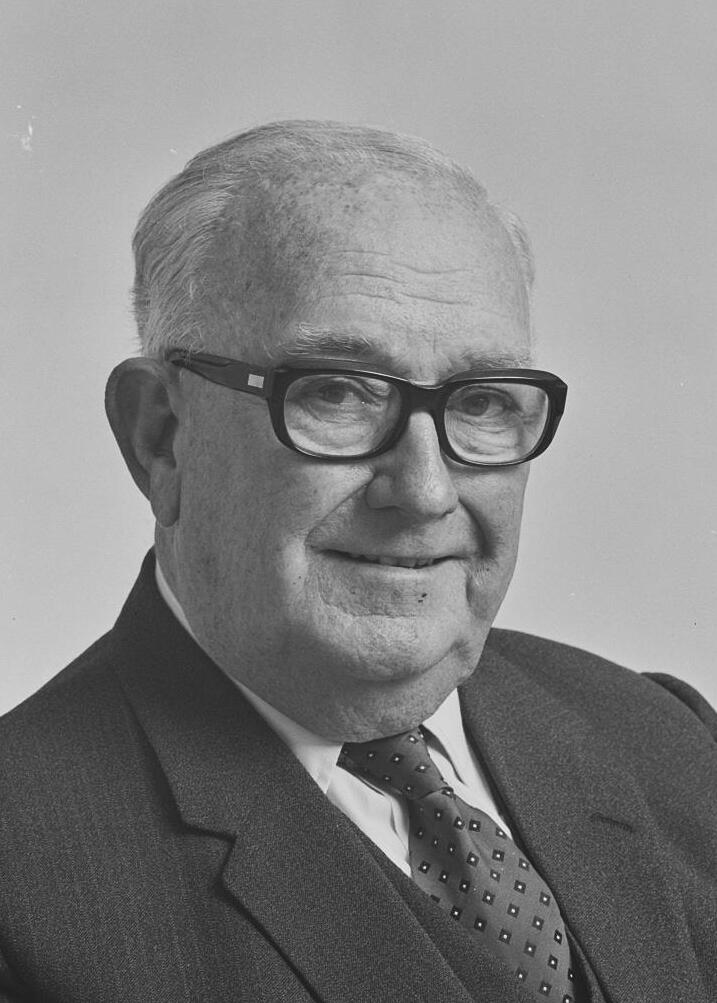
Gair in 1972

Although he was no longer Premier, Gair continued to lead the QLP, which was reduced to 11 members after the 1957 election. However, he was defeated at South Brisbane at the 1960 state election. In 1962 the QLP merged with the Democratic Labor Party, which had previously been largely inactive in Queensland. Gair unsuccessfully contested the Senate election of 1961 for the DLP. In 1964 he was elected as a DLP Senator for Queensland.

He became the second former Queensland Premier after Anderson Dawson to be elected to Federal Parliament as a Queensland representative. Two other former Premiers Tom Ryan and Ted Theodore had also served in Federal Parliament but were elected as New South Wales representatives in the House of Representatives.

On his election to the Senate, Gair became the federal DLP's leader, a post he held until 1973. During his time in the Senate he advocated a strong defence and foreign policy based on anti-Communism. The DLP generally sought the middle ground on domestic issues. Gradually his anti-Communist views became outdated but he stubbornly refused to modify them in the face of developments like Richard Nixon's détente with China and Russia in the early 1970s.

=== The "Gair Affair" ===
Gair subsequently became disillusioned with the DLP's other senators, who forced him to resign as leader in October 1973. In 1974, when the Federal Labor government of Gough Whitlam was desperately attempting to gain a majority in the Senate, Whitlam tried to create an extra vacancy in Queensland for the upcoming Senate election so as to gain the ALP an increased chance of winning an extra Senate seat.

Whitlam approached Gair with the offer of the position of Ambassador to Ireland and not as a reconciliation with an ALP deflector in Gair, which Gair accepted on 14 March. Whitlam intended to keep the appointment confidential until 2 April, when Gair would tender his resignation from his Senate seat retroactive to 20 March, when Dublin cabled its acceptance of Gair's appointment to Canberra. This would force the issuing of writs for the election of six Senators from Queensland, not five as would normally have been the case. Labor would have a realistic chance of winning three of those seats, and with it control of the Senate. Subsequently, when knowledge of the appointment became public on 2 April there was an outcry from the conservative parties. The then Queensland Premier Joh Bjelke-Petersen decided to thwart Whitlam by causing the issue of writs for the usual five Senate vacancies before Gair could resign.

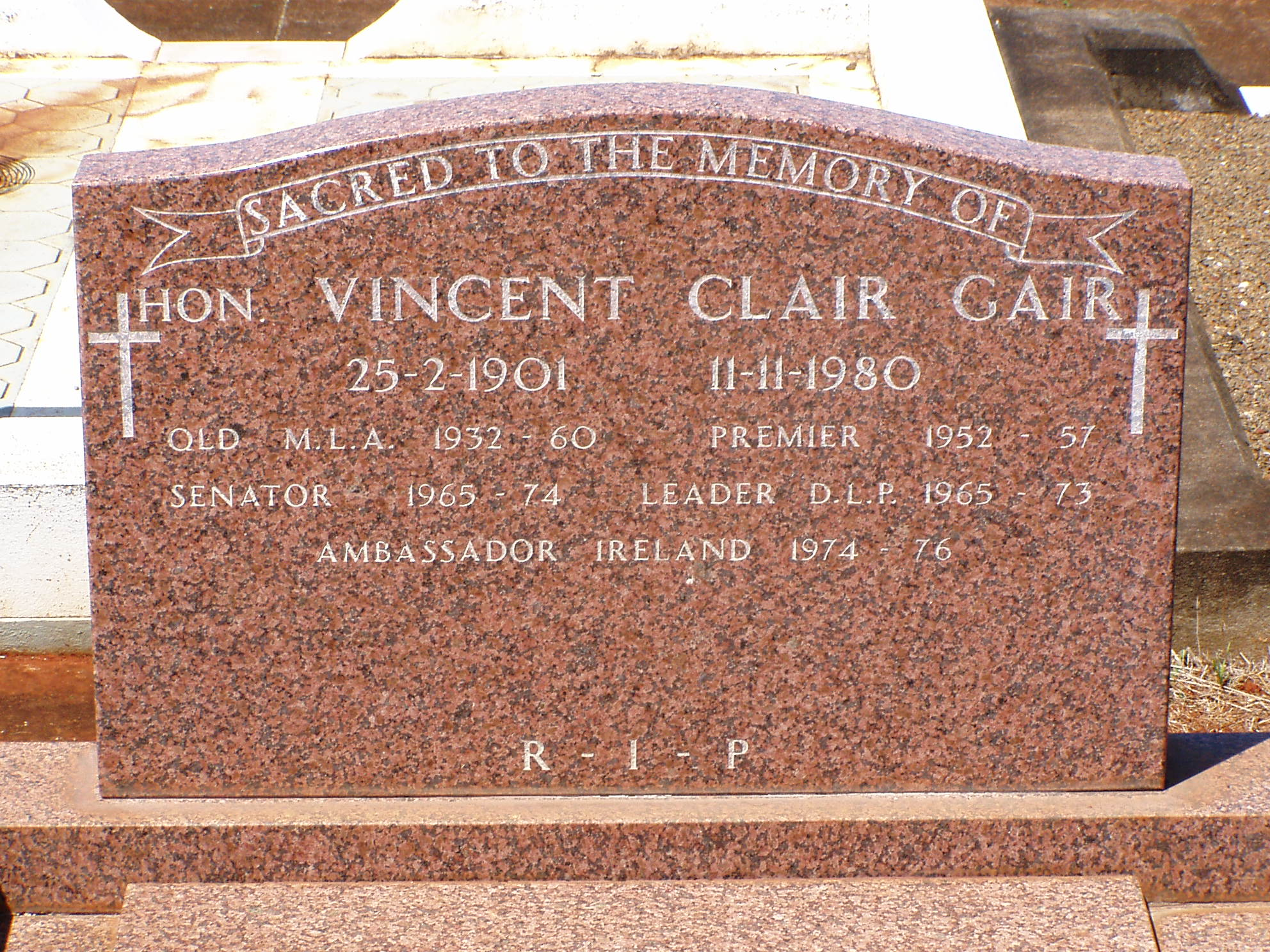
Vince Gair's headstone at Brisbane's Nudgee Cemetery.

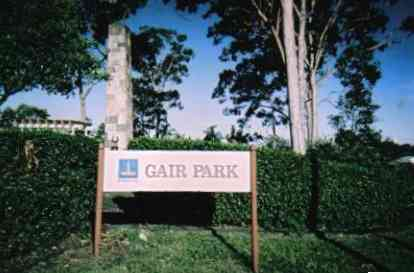
Cenotaph behind hedges, Gair Park

In Canberra, a group of Country Party senators kept Gair occupied in their office, away from the President of the Senate Magnus Cormack (to whom he needed to give his resignation), drinking beer and eating prawns, until 6pm (the Commonwealth Electoral Act provided that writs would be deemed to have been issued at 6pm irrespective of the time that they were actually issued). At 6:05pm, the Queensland Cabinet met and advised the governor, Air Marshal Sir Colin Hannah, to issue writs for the election of five senators for Queensland, and the writs were issued at 11pm. As a result, Gair failed to resign his Senate position in time for there to be six vacancies instead of five, thus thwarting Whitlam's plan. This delaying tactic was later known as "the Night of the Long Prawns". Gair later claimed he was perfectly aware of why he was being feted by his colleagues, some of whom were former enemies. Gair's actions helped to precipitate a double dissolution. After the 18 May election, the ALP remained without control of the Senate. The 1974 election marked the electoral demise of the DLP, which lost all four of its remaining seats, largely as a backlash against Gair's actions.

== Later life ==
Gair took up his post in Ireland. During his tenure, he got into numerous rows with the Irish Department of Foreign Affairs and other ambassadors. His female staff refused to travel with him in car or even elevator and many resigned in response to his frequently inappropriate behaviour. In 1987, Paul McGeough wrote in the Sydney Morning Herald of Gair's 'complete lack of interest in his official duties as against his remarkable interest in the embassy marketing officer's secretary and his pursuit of theatre barmaids... the message to Canberra was that its man abroad was a bit of an animal.' He also frequently criticised Opposition Leader Billy Snedden. After the Fraser government was confirmed to office at the 1975 election, Foreign Minister Andrew Peacock had Gair recalled on 21 January 1976, not for political reasons, but because he was unfit for diplomacy.

== Death ==
Gair returned to Brisbane, and died on 11 November 1980, aged 79, on the fifth anniversary of the dismissal of the Whitlam government. He was given a state funeral and was buried in Nudgee Cemetery.

== Memorials ==
Gair Park in Dutton Park, Brisbane, is named after Gair. The park is a triangular "garden of remembrance" with a Cenotaph, which originally opened on 25 April 1951.

== See also ==
- Australian Labor Party split of 1955
- 1975 Australian constitutional crisis

Parliament of Queensland
Preceded by Neil MacGroarty	Member for South Brisbane; 1932–1960	Succeeded by Col Bennett
Political offices
Preceded by James Larcombe	Treasurer of Queensland; 1950–1952	Succeeded by Ted Walsh
Preceded by Ned Hanlon	Premier of Queensland; 1952–1957	Succeeded by Frank Nicklin
Diplomatic posts
Preceded by Keith Brennan	Australian Ambassador to Ireland; 1974–1976	Succeeded by Brian Hill
