= Jock McCorkell =

Australian rules footballer and coach

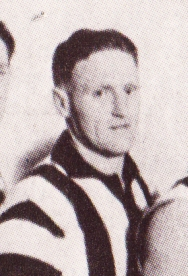

Personal information
- Full name: John Francis McCorkell
- Born: 2 July 1918; Sale, Victoria, Australia
- Died: 29 March 1987 (aged 68); Greensborough, Victoria, Australia
- Original team: St Kevin's College
- Height: 183 cm (6 ft 0 in)
- Weight: 86 kg (190 lb)

Playing career^{1}
Years	Club	Games (Goals)
1940–1942, 1946–1953	North Melbourne	167 (5)

Coaching career
Years	Club	Games (W–L–D)
1954–1955	North Melbourne	37 (14–22–1)
- ^{1} Playing statistics correct to the end of 1953.

Career highlights
- North Melbourne Best & Fairest 1952

John Francis McCorkell (2 July 1918 – 29 March 1987) was an Australian rules footballer who played with the North Melbourne Football Club in the Victorian Football League, (VFL).

== Early life ==
McCorkell was born in Sale, Victoria to parents Francis, a policeman, and Dora. When the family moved to North Melbourne, close to the home ground of what was to become his cherished football club later in life, he made good use of the facilities available. He attended St Josephs CBC North Melbourne between 1932 and 1935 and then St Kevin's College in 1936. In 1951 he was a member of the North Old Boys football team which won the Premiership of the Combined Catholic Old Collegians Association.

The 1953 Golden Jubilee annual of St Josephs College describes him as being a, "...very popular and skillful full-back". It goes on to mention that he also played for Victoria in the States representative team. Interstate matches in Australian rules football were considered very important and a showcase for the talents of its players.

== Sportsman ==
"On leaving school McCorkell continued his athletic pursuits and during his early life was considered an excellent runner. In 1935 while competing with the Carlton Harriers he was running faster times than men placed in divisions above his, in particular the 220 yard dash.

In January 1940 McCorkell entered the Australian Army and joined the 6th Battalion with the rank of Private. Three years later he signed for service overseas, and, as a Lance sergeant, became a member of the Australian Special Intelligence Personnel Section before finally being discharged in December 1945.

On his return from army service he resumed his playing career and for the next eight seasons was a valuable member of the North Melbourne team until breaking his leg in 1953. In 1954 he was appointed coach and took the side into the season finals but they were defeated in the first round, eventually placing third on the ladder that year. During the following year the team met stiff opposition from its opponents eventually slipping to eleventh place.

== Later life ==
Following the disastrous 1955 season McCorkell announced his retirement from league football. He stated he was unable to provide the effort and time required to carry out the duties of coach at a successful level. This decision was due to two reasons, his study commitments, he was aiming to become an accountant, and commitments to his six children.

McCorkell continued his work in the Public Service after moving to live in Essendon. He died in March 1987 at the age of 68.
