= St Joseph's College, Melbourne =

St Joseph's College Melbourne
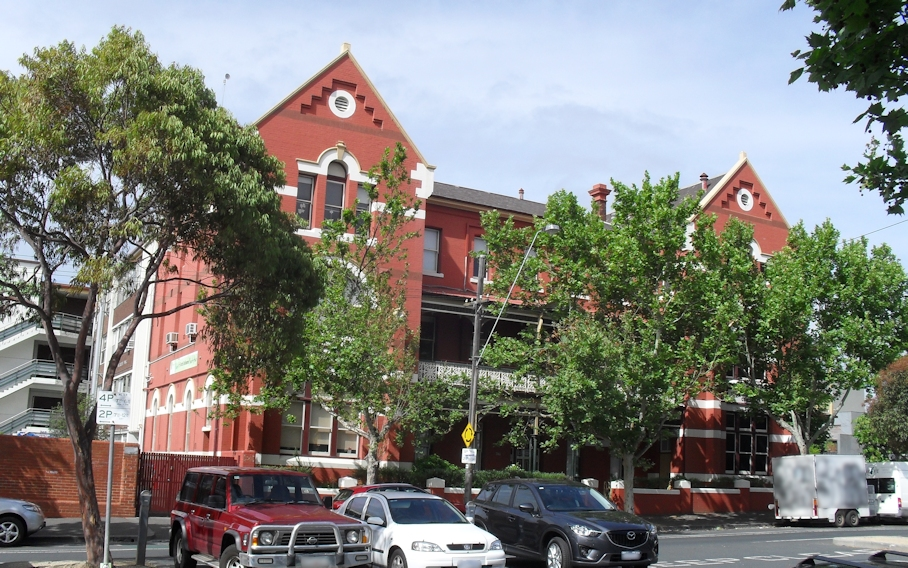

Location
- Melbourne, Victoria; Australia; 37°48′14″S 144°57′17″E

Information
- Type: Independent secondary school for boys
- Motto: Luceat Lux Vestra (Let your light shine)
- Established: 1903
- Founder: Irish Christian Brothers
- Closed: December 2010
- Classes: Year 7–12
- Campus: North Melbourne and Pascoe Vale
- Colours: Purple, white, gold & blue
- Affiliation: Roman Catholic, Christian Brothers, ACC

St Joseph's College Melbourne was a Roman Catholic secondary college which opened early in 1903 and closed at the end of 2010. It was part of the Association of Edmund Rice schools, founded and run in the tradition of the Christian Brothers. Between the years 2000 and 2009 it formally operated two campuses, a senior campus (VCE and VET) located in Queensberry Street, North Melbourne, Victoria and a junior campus (Years 7–10), in Brearley Parade, Pascoe Vale, Victoria. These two campuses were previously known as St. Joseph's College, North Melbourne and St. Joseph's College, Pascoe Vale respectively.

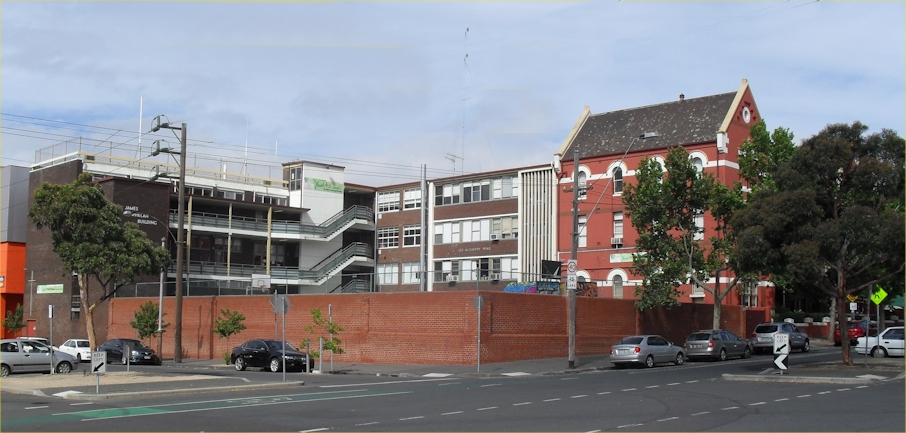
College buildings, from left, Whelan Building, Les McCarthy wing and main building as seen from Queensberry Street, 2014

== Sport ==
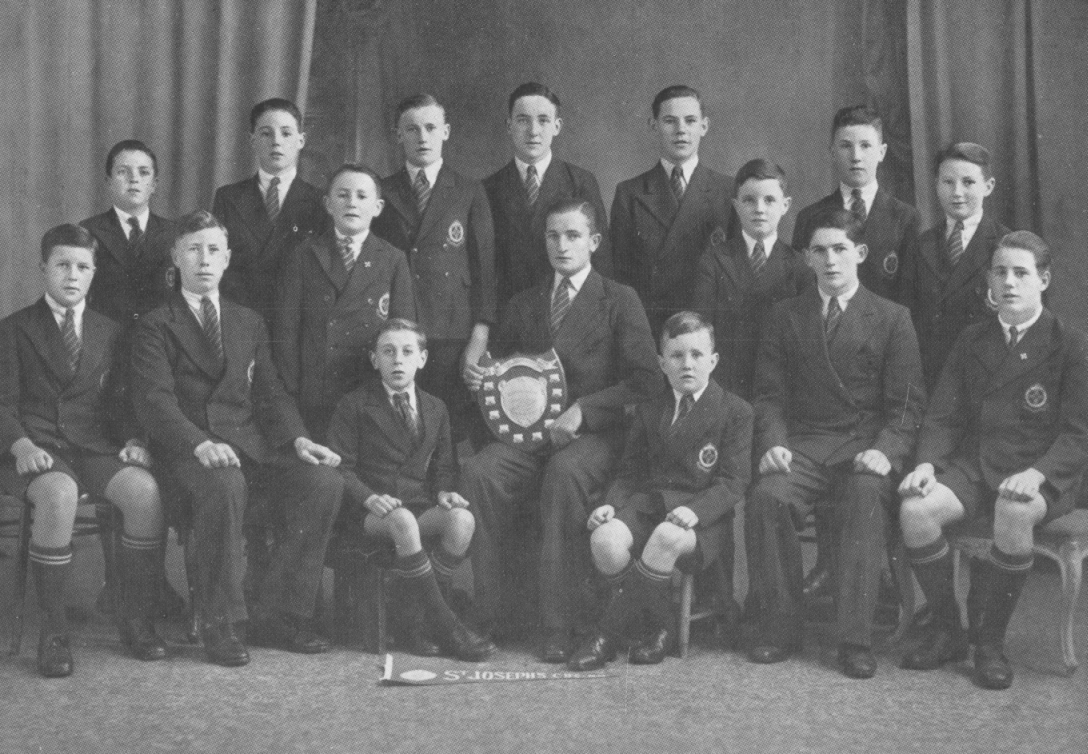
Swimming Team 1940, winners of the Walsh Shield (Kevin Dynon, seated second from left)

Sport was an important ingredient in the education of boys attending North. The school had its own football squad as early as 1906 when it played its first match against Christian Brothers College, St Kilda at Albert Park where it scored 2 points. As enrolments grew then so did the involvement in other sports, often in competition with other schools. Inter school athletics, handball and tennis competitions, such as those conducted by the then Combined Catholic Schools Association organisation, were held as early as 1911. The College was a founding member of the Association and won the Athletics Championship in 1914.

Their famous 70 meter long banners, North is Speed, Power, and a cheer squad, led by the Committee organizing War cries, or COW, where notable features of the annual competitions at the Olympic Park Stadium.

St Joseph's College students also became members of one of the schools sporting houses or teams. These built on the existing pastoral class groupings to generate team spirit during sporting carnivals with students wearing their team colors. These houses, later named after four early headmasters of the college, were:

Hogan McSweeney Geoghegan Kelly

== College crest ==
At the time of amalgamation in 2000 a new logo was developed to represent the college. This logo was composed of pre-existing elements which were representative of the school's history and philosophy. Set on a traditional heraldic background, in the form of a shield, it features a rampant Gryphon protecting a smaller inner shield bearing a large shining star, a symbol used by the Christian Brothers, supported by smaller stars in the shape of the southern cross. The entire design sits above a ribbon which includes the words, "Luceat Lux Vestra". The symbol appeared on the newly designed College uniform, which included a blazer after a lapse of a number of years, and various College medallions. The logo was used extensively on College publications and documents including Cynosura, the annual school magazine.

== Associated schools ==
Over its long 107-year history the college was associated with a number of schools at one time or another. These included many primary, or feeder schools, to which the college Old Boys Association offered scholarships up until the 1950s. The school also had connections with a number of higher secondary colleges such as St Kevin's and Parade, East Melbourne. Although not exhaustive this list includes most of those known.

	Schools	
St Oliver Plunkett (Pascoe Vale)	St Paul's (Coburg)	St Fidelis (Moreland)
St Mark's (Fawkner)	St Matthew's (North Fawkner)	St Thomas More (Hadfield)
Corpus Christi (Glenroy)	St Joseph's (West Brunswick)	St Monica's (Moonee Ponds)
St Brendan's (Flemington)	St. Augustine's College, Yarraville	St Columba's Primary (Essendon)
Trinity College (Brunswick)	St Mary's Primary School, West Melbourne	Cathedral College, East Melbourne
Therry College (Broadmeadows)	St Thomas' (Clifton Hill)	St Joseph's (North Fitzroy)
St Joseph's Technical School, Abbotsford	St Joseph's Technical School (South Melbourne)	St Kevin's College (Toorak)
St George's School, Carlton	St Ambrose's School, Brunswick	

== College history ==
=== 1903–1930 ===
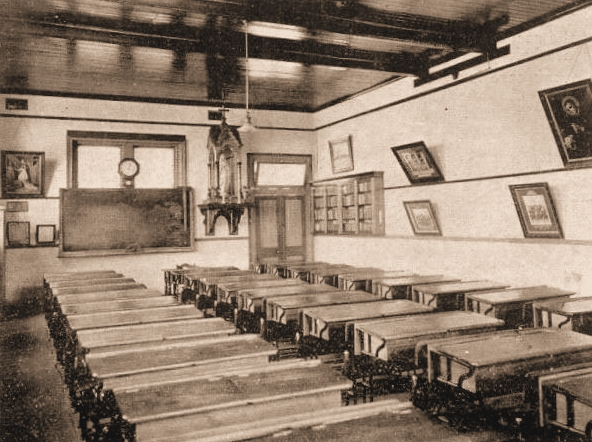
Junior students classroom, circa 1913

St. Joseph's owes its early beginnings, in part, to the establishment of St Mary's Primary School, West Melbourne some 50 years earlier. With high numbers of Catholic children in the area needing education, members of the Christian Brothers were asked to take control of existing schools at West Melbourne and at Carlton. At the same time they were to establish a Brothers community and a secondary school in Queensberry Street, North Melbourne and this was completed by the end of 1902. This 'community house' was the residence of Brothers teaching at St. Mary's, St. George's (Carlton), St. Joseph's, and for a time, St. Augustine's College, Yarraville. The total cost of the building and furnishings was a little over £4516, £3000 of which was provided by local parish priests. The combined enrolment of St. Mary's, St, Joseph's and St. George's was 550 boys in 1903.

In January 1903, Christian Brothers' High School, as it was then known, opened with an enrolment of 44 students. Staffed by three Christian Brothers, that number had grown to 112 by the beginning of 1904. Students were divided into eight classes; Second, Third, Fourth, Fifth and Sixth, a Commercial Class, Sub-Matriculation and Matriculation Class.

The first Principal was William J Hogan, followed by Francis A Kelly in 1904 and Matthew A Geoghegan in 1908. The first football team, featuring a large white star on its guernsey, was formed around 1906 and began a long tradition of involvement in a variety of sports. A year earlier a wooden handball court had been built, a first for any school in Melbourne and in 1913 this was replaced by a brick three wall court, said to be the best in Australia at the time. Over the next five decades the school hosted State and Interstate handball championships at various times. The court continued to be used by the Victorian Handball Association up until at least 2010 but in the second half of the century the popularity of handball was surpassed by team sports such as Australian Football.

Early school Annuals indicate a variety of titles to identify the school and it was not until 1912 that the name "St. Joseph's" was formally added. Even though its naming varied slightly over the years, the school was more simply known to its students as "North".

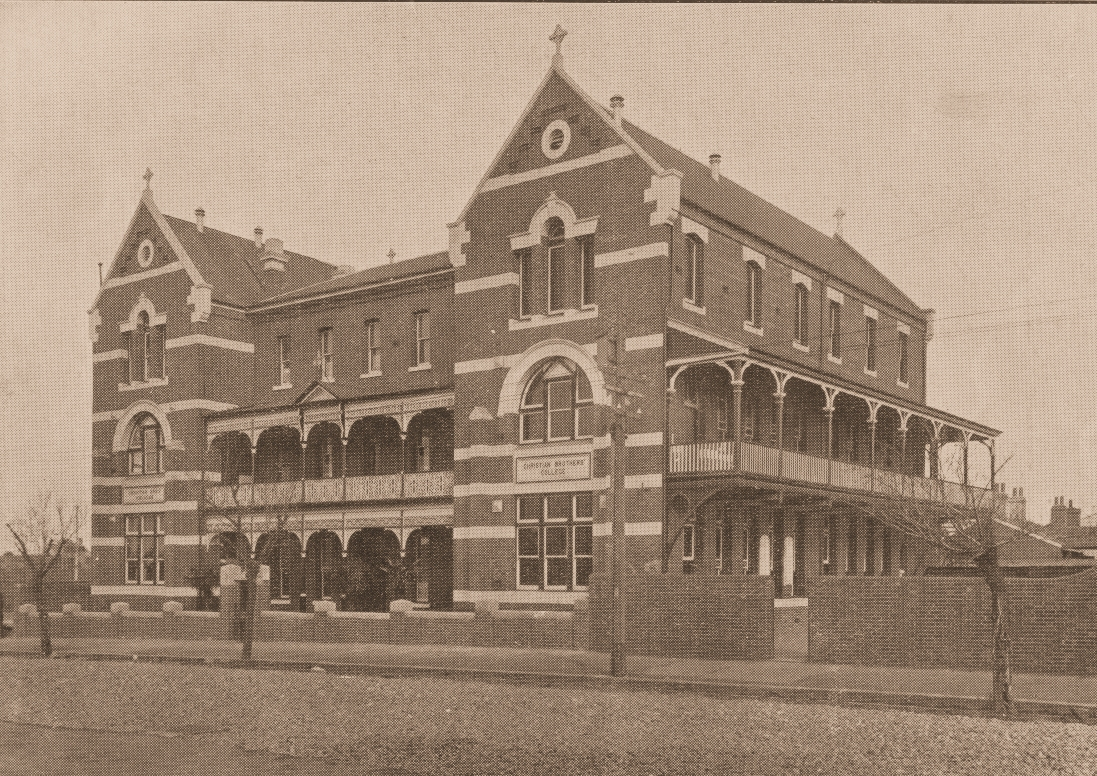
St Joseph's CBC North Melbourne, Queensberry Street, circa 1928

In 1913 the North Old Boys Association was formed to assist the school in serving its expanding school population (200 pupils in 1909) and the increasing need for finances as the period after the First World War was an economically difficult one. In the early years both Primary and Secondary school classes were conducted on the Queensberry Street site. The school was able to achieve impressive educational results from its pupils in Junior and Senior University and Public Service Examinations as results published in early Annuals show.

Between 1918 and 1941, students wishing to study for their Leaving Certificate had to do so at St. Kevin's College. By 1921 the enrolment stood at 174 and handball had become the leading sport and both public and school tournaments were frequently held on the handball court.

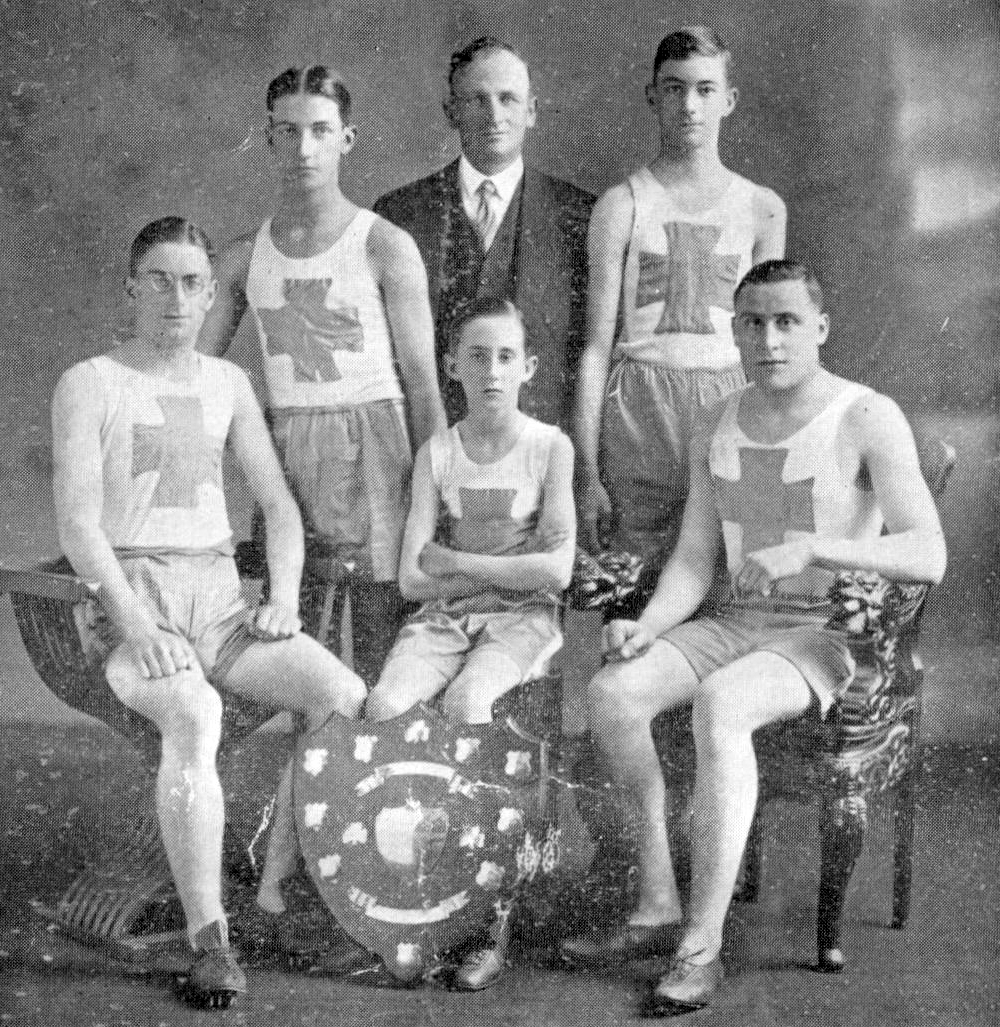
Athletics Shield winners 1930; left to right: B. Curran, R. Skinner, K. Bye, Mr. Pemberton, J. Hibbert, and R. Dalman

=== 1940–1960 ===
By 1940 the Christian Brothers' felt that the school had expanded to the point where it was able to take over the provision of night classes in a Catholic Accountancy school for young men in the Melbourne area. The classes started with 40 or 50 students but expanded, post war, to around 200 and provided study allowing its pupils to attain membership to the Australian Society of Accountants. Hundreds of young men attended there until 1969 when the night school closed.

1951 saw the first Matriculation class since its earliest years. A class of 23 students graduated from the College meaning that it had attained full secondary school status. During the Golden Jubilee year of 1953, 122 boys were members of the College Cadet unit and provided a martial spectacle as they paraded before visiting dignitaries. Arthur Calwell, a prominent politician and old boy, was a guest speaker on one occasion as was Archbishop Daniel Mannix.

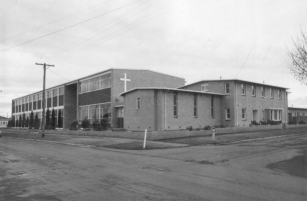
The Preparatory College ready for its first students

During the 1950s the growing school population, due partly to the post War migration boom, forced the college to purchase land and eventually build a second school in the suburb of Pascoe Vale. In 1956 the Preparatory College, as it was then known, opened under the guidance of Ernest S Crowle as principal, who was himself an old boy of the college. In its early years it provided tuition in Grades 4, 5, 6 and Form 1 and had an initial enrolment of 274. By 1970 the school had become entirely secondary with classes comprising Form 1 to 4. Traditionally students completed their "junior" studies (Grades 7 to 10) at Pascoe Vale and then transferred to the "senior" campus in North Melbourne.

From its early beginnings the college was heavily involved in a range of sports and Australian Rules Football in particular. North's football teams were often considered tough opponents both within the local school competition and the Victorian Amateur Football Association (VAFA) as the North Old Boys Amateur Football Club, or NOB's, which it rejoined in 1964 after a lapse in membership. In 2005 the North club amalgamated with St Patrick's College, Ballarat to become North Old Boys St. Patrick's College Amateur Football Club.

=== 1980–2010 ===
During the later 1970s, 80s and into the 1990s, the Preparatory School in Pascoe Vale South, also known as St. Joseph's Junior College, with enrolments averaging around 490, took on a more independent identity to eventually be known as St. Joseph's College, Pascoe Vale. It had a separate administration, principal, School Board, registration number, logo and annual magazine, known as Scythia, to set it apart from its parent school, North.

Beginning in 1997 preliminary discussions regarding the future of the two schools took place with a view to ensuring their continuing viability. The major issues included enrolments, student welfare, administrative structures, curriculum, staffing and finances. In 1998 the outcome of talks and independent reviews was that the schools should amalgamate within two years in order to remain a relevant and viable educational entity.

The year 2000 saw the two sites formally amalgamated under a new name and banner to become the one College. It retained the traditional College colours of purple and white and College motto. A common uniform, which included a navy blue blazer with monogrammed logo, became mandatory. In 2003 the total student population was approximately 750 cared for by a single Principal, two Campus Directors and 92 staff.

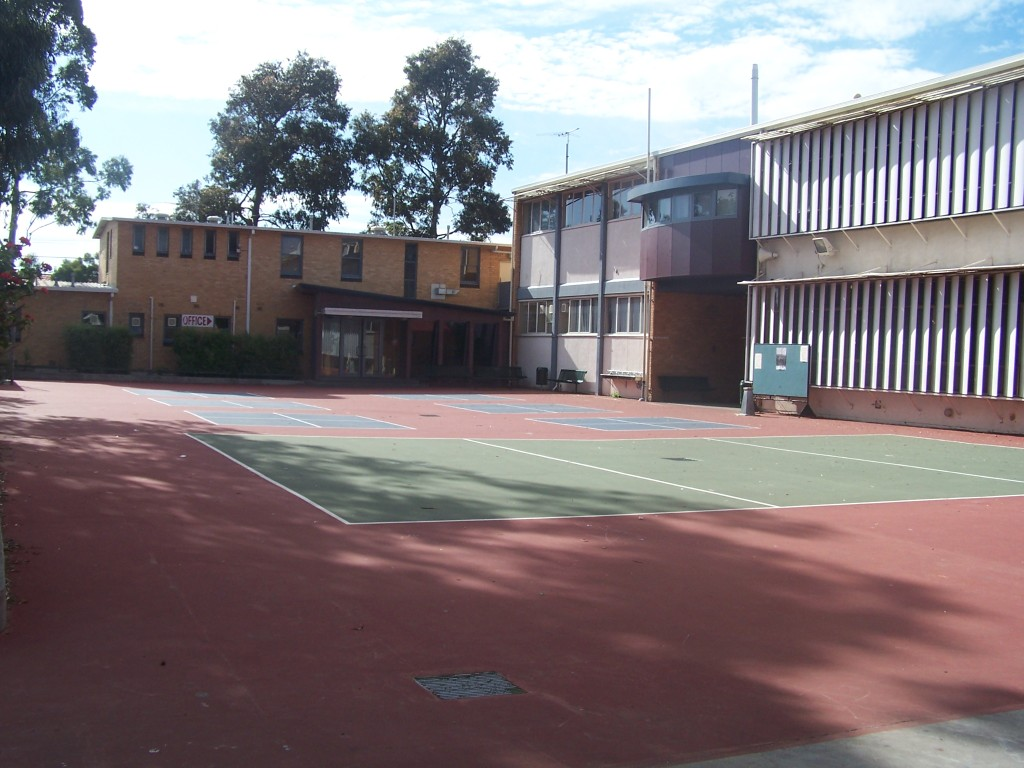
Quadrangle St Joseph's Pascoe Vale campus

By 2008 the decision was made by Edmund Rice Education Australia (EREA) and the Christian Brothers to begin a phased closure of the college. The reasons behind the closure included falling enrolments (570 students), amenities and plant which had become outdated and partly rundown and issues related to student management and involvement. At the end of 2009 the Pascoe Vale campus closed and was stripped of any saleable assets; much was simply dumped leaving only the buildings. Those students who had stayed on were offered places, with some concessions, at other Catholic schools for the continuation of their studies. Likewise, staff, if they wished, were seconded to other schools prior to being declared redundant at the end of 2010. A number of past students were saddened by the closure of the school, they, and many parents, felt more could have been done by the Christian Brothers and EREA to allow it to remain open.

During an address given in 2002 the leader of the Congregation of Christian Brothers, Philip Pinto, alluded to another reason for the changes needed to the existing College structure. In that address he urged his fellow Brothers to return to Edmund Rice's vision; a renewed commitment to young people on the margins of society. It is best summed up in the following, "to look at life from the standpoint of the minority, the victim, the outcast, and the stranger. In doing so we will be giving hope to those who presently have little hope."

=== Dark days ===
In 2004 a former principal of St Joseph's Preparatory College, Pascoe Vale, Keith Weston, pleaded guilty to, and was convicted of, a number of assault cases. These cases related to students who attended Christian Brothers led organizations and schools. Weston died in 2014 before he could be interviewed by Victoria Police concerning other cases of assault which had been brought to their attention. His actions and those of others were acknowledged during a closure event at the Pascoe Vale campus in 2009.

Julian McDonald, in a newsletter published by the Christian Brothers, writes, "For us Christian Brothers, accepting the truth will mean acknowledging that a significant number of us have abused children in our care sexually, emotionally and physically. Abuse is, indeed, part of our sinful history." Weston was not alone as a minority of the members of the Congregation at a few schools also caused much hurt; as McDonald says in way of explaining this, "far too many [were] ill-equipped and ill-formed". On 1 June 2017, Wayne Tinsey, speaking for Edmund Rice Education Australia, made a formal apology to victims of sexual abuse who were also past students of Christian Brothers schools across the country.

=== Post 2010 ===
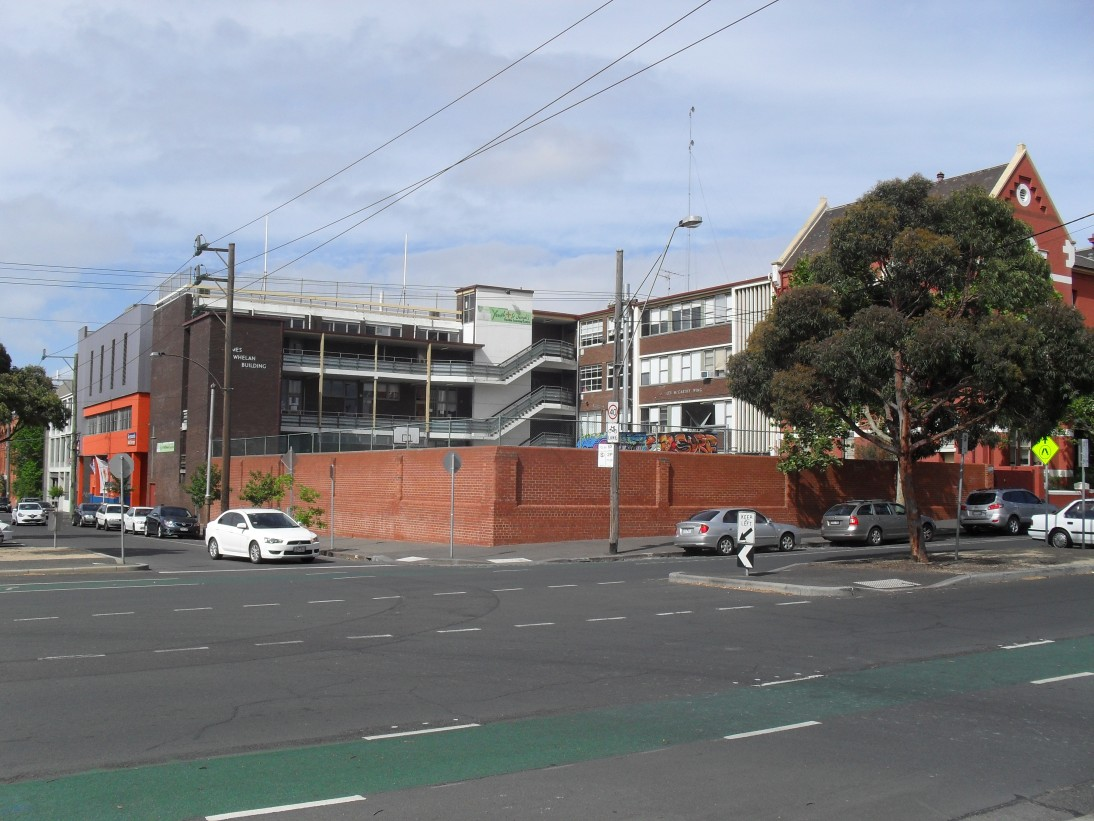
St Joseph's FLC, Queensberry Street North Melbourne

In 2010 extensive refurbishment work was carried out on the Pascoe Vale site by its new owners and later reopened as Saint Joseph Campus of Antonine College. At the end of the 2010 academic year the North Melbourne campus closed with a final Commemorative Mass and a range of ceremonies attended by current and past students and staff. In 2011 the site was temporarily closed as plans for a new learning center were formulated.

At the beginning of 2012 St. Joseph's Flexible Learning Centre opened at the old St. Joseph's site in North Melbourne. It is part of the Youth Plus Network managed by Edmund Rice Education Australia and is just one of many such centers around Australia. Its aim is to, provide young people with an opportunity to re-engage in education in a supported learning environment. At the end of the 2014 academic year 292 students were officially enrolled full-time at the centre to work with the 50 staff, made up of teachers, social workers and support staff.

St. Josephs FLC was shortly thereafter rebranded as Saints College and remains as part of the Edmund Rice Education Australia network.

== Former Alumni ==
=== Australian rules football ===
'North' produced more than 50 Victorian Football League players, some of whom are listed below. A number of others also played with the Victorian Football Association, other major leagues or served as coaches or administrators.

- Stephen Alessio (player with Essendon Football Club)
- John Barker (Australian footballer) (player and coach with Fitzroy Football Club, Brisbane Lions and Hawthorn Football Club)
- Bob Bradley (player with Essendon Football Club)
- Ray Brew (player and past Captain of Carlton Football Club)
- Edward Considine (player Essendon Football Club and Sydney Football Club)
- Gerry Donnelly (player and past Captain of North Melbourne Football Club)
- Laurie Dwyer (player with North Melbourne Football Club)
- Leo Dwyer (player with North Melbourne Football Club)
- Kevin Dynon (College Captain 1940, athlete, player and past captain of North Melbourne Football Club)
- Tom Fitzmaurice (Australian Football Hall of Fame)
- Anthony Franchina (player with Carlton Football Club)
- Tony Furey (player with North Melbourne Football Club)
- Shannon Grant (player with Sydney Football Club and North Melbourne Football Club)
- Jack Green (player with Carlton Football Club and Hawthorn Football Club)
- Aaron Hamill (player with Carlton Football Club)
- Mark Hannebery (player with Collingwood Football Club, amateurs Captain and Coach)
- Paul Koulouriotis (player with Port Adelaide Football Club and Geelong Football Club)
- Allan La Fontaine (College Captain 1927, 28, 29, player and past captain of Melbourne Football Club)
- Jock McCorkell (player with North Melbourne Football Club)
- Donald McDonald (player, assistant coach and administrator with North Melbourne Football Club)
- Bill Spurling (player with Footscray Football Club)

=== Clergy ===
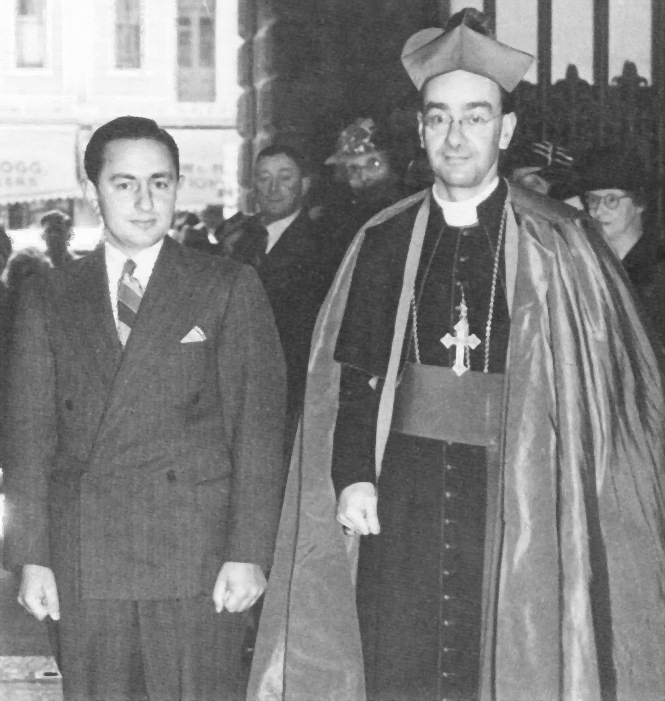
Bob Santamaria and Archbishop Beovich, c. 1943

More than 100 boys were to become ordained priests representing ten different religious Orders. Of this number, four went on to become Bishops.

- Matthew Beovich (archbishop of Adelaide)
- Patrick Lyons (bishop)
- John Aloysius Morgan (bishop)
- John James Scullion (biblical scholar, writer and theologian)
- Bernard Denis Stewart (bishop of Sandhurst)

=== General ===
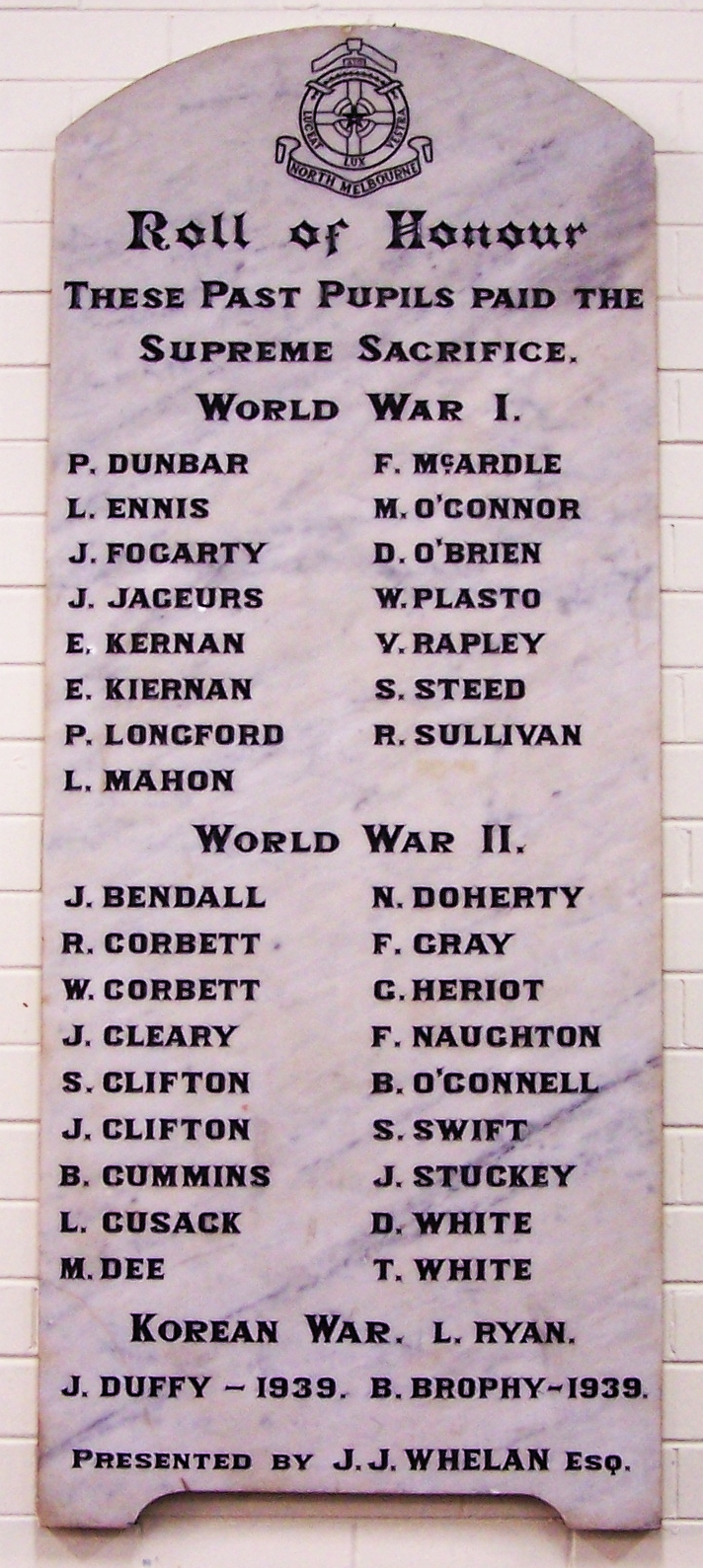
One of five marble boards honouring past student achievers

More than 75 past pupils served in the army during World War I. Of those 16 died while on active service. During World War II, over 780 past pupils served in the military forces; 28 died on active service and ten became prisoners of war.

- Damien Broderick, PhD (Science and Science Fiction writer and editor)
- Paul Coghlan (Judge of the Supreme Court of Victoria)
- William Cremor CBE (army leader and educationalist)
- Adrian Martin (Australian film and arts critic)
- Ron Tandberg (journalist and cartoonist)

=== Politics and public service ===
- Thomas Brennan (Victorian state politician)
- Arthur Calwell (former Opposition Party Leader)
- George Fewster (Victorian politician)
- James Gobbo, AC, CVO, QC (born 22 March 1931), 25th Governor of Victoria
- Peter Kavanagh (member of Victorian Parliament, Leader of DLP (Democratic Labour Party))
- Nick McKenna (Australian politician)
- Frank McManus (politician)
- Victor Perton (member of Victorian Parliament, Member of LP (Liberal Party)
- Bob Santamaria (social commentator)
- Richard Wynne (MLA for Richmond)

=== Sports ===
- Phil Cleary (sportsman and social commentator)
- Tony Dodemaide (test cricketer – Australia)
- Jack Elliott OAM (leading horse racing journalist and presenter)
- Michael Ferrante (A-League football player)
- Paul Hibbert (test cricketer – Australia)
- Leo O'Brien (test cricketer – Australia)
- Andrew Nabbout (A-League football player for Melbourne Victory)
- Paul Stoddart (business and sporting entrepreneur)

== Former College principals ==
CBC, North Melbourne

- 1903 William Hogan
- 1904–1907 Francis Kelly
- 1908–1916 Matthew Geoghegan
- 1917 Edmund Keniry
- 1918 Matthew Geoghegan
- 1919 Br's Geoghegan, Hanrahan and Kelly
- 1920–1921 Francis Kelly
- 1922–1923 James O'Brien
- 1924–1925 Laurence Tevlin
- 1926–1928 Terence Bourke
- 1929–1930 John O'Shea
- 1931–1933 James Fagan
- 1934–1937 Jeremiah McSweeney
- 1938–1943 Joseph King
- 1944–1946 Joseph Turpin
- 1947–1951 Hugh Boylan
- 1952–1956 Ernest Crowle
- 1957–1959 John Saul
- 1960–1965 Ron Stewart
- 1966–1968 Albert Kilpatrick
- 1969–1974 George Frances
- 1975–1980 Reginald Long
- 1981–1986 Kevin Buckley
- 1987–1991 Peter Richardson
- 1992–1999 Kevin Buckley

St Josephs Pascoe Vale

- 1956–1959 Ernest Crowle
- 1960–1965 Bernard Hayes
- 1966–1971 Keith Weston
- 1972–1974 Kevin Gall
- 1975–1977 Trevor Dean
- 1978–1983 Tony Smith
- 1984 Peter O'Donoghue
- 1985–1987 James Peart
- 1988–1993 Patrick Smith
- 1994–1997 Kevin Laws
- 1998–1999 Frank Hennessy
- St Josephs College Melbourne
- 2000–2004 Stephen McIllhatton
- 2004 Laurie Collins
- 2005–2009 Maree Johnson
- 2009–2010 Ted Javernik

== Former School song and War Cry ==
School Song

Give a cheer for CBC, thro the years her fame has grown.
Her grand ideals have enhanced her name,
bearing fruit wherever seed is sown.
Ev'ry rank and walk of life, has noble sons
who'll e'er be true
Ready to stand in peace and strife,
beside the standard of purple and white.
Purple and white are the colours we love,
Excelsior they seem to say,
And beckon us to reach the heights above.
Faith gives her light with the torch burning bright,
Its flame guiding us to do and dare,
That North may be beyond compare.

by Bernard Murphy (1946)

War cry

Caddaburra, Wirracanna, Yarrawonga, Yah!
Tallangatta, Wangaratta, Oodnadatta Aah!
Nulla Gulla, Wulla Gulla, Wish Bang Wah!
Cynosura, Cynosura, Yah, Yah, Yah!
North, North, Yah, Yah . . N O R T H . . North!
Caddaburra, Wirracanna, Yarrawonga, Yah!
Tallangatta, Wangaratta, Oodnadatta Aah!
Nulla Gulla, Wulla Gulla, Wish Bang Wah!
Cynosura, Cynosura, Yah, Yah, Yah!
North, North, Yah, Yah . . N O R T H . . North!

== See also ==
- Victorian Certificate of Education
- List of schools in Victoria, Australia
- Education in Australia
- Congregation of Christian Brothers
