= October 1954 Australian Labor Party leadership spill =

1954 Australian Labor Party Leadership spill motion
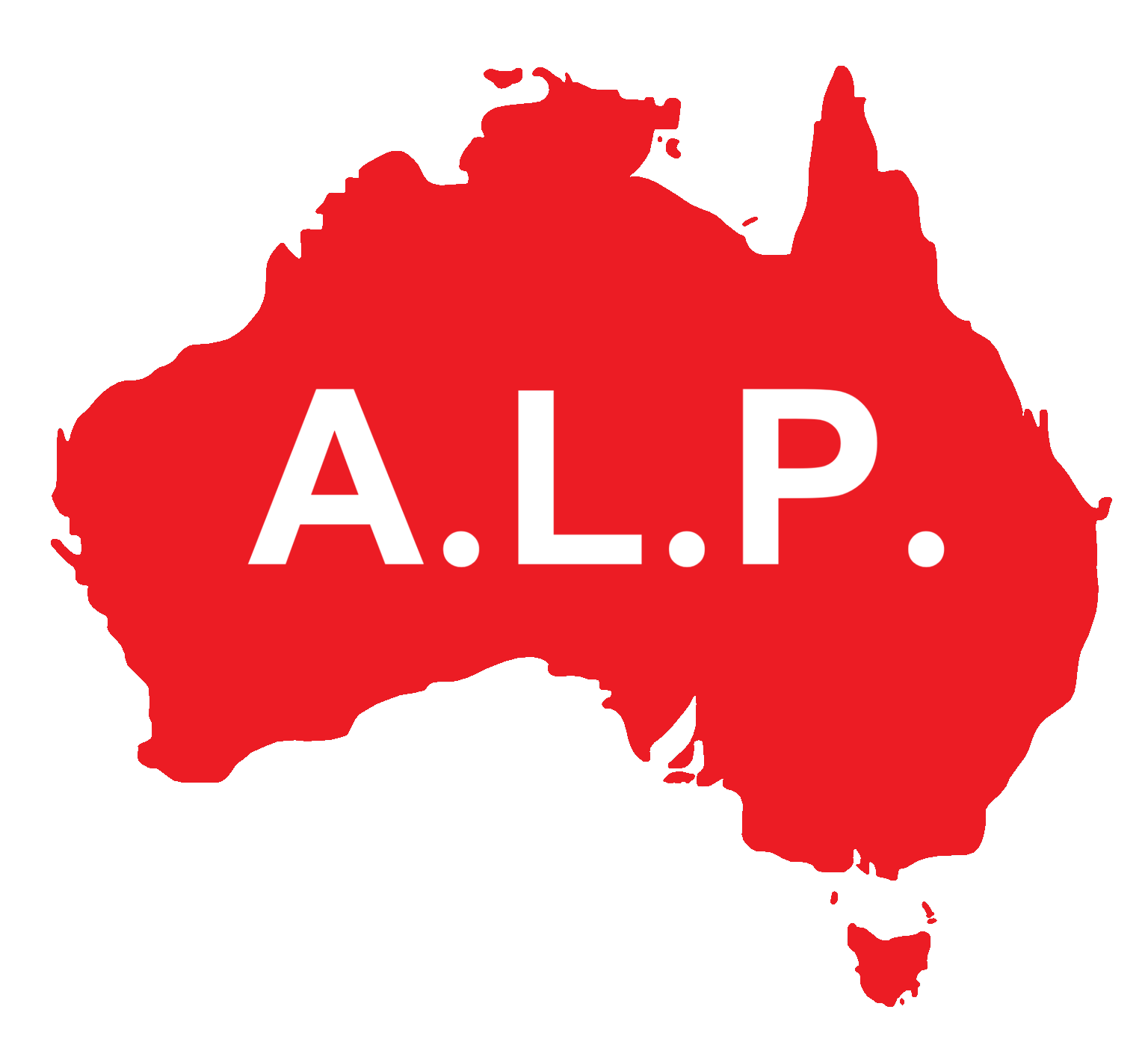
- 21 October 1954
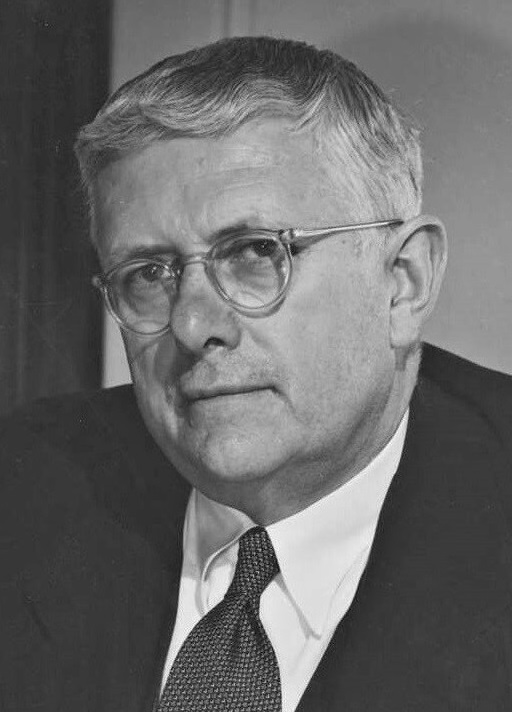

Candidate	H. V. Evatt	Spill motion
Caucus vote	52 (65.0%)	28 (35.0%)
Leader before election
H. V. Evatt
Elected Leader
H. V. Evatt

A leadership spill of the Australian Labor Party (ALP), then the opposition party in the Parliament of Australia, was rejected on 21 October 1954.

== Background ==
Following the ALP's defeat at the 1954 federal election, H. V. Evatt was challenged at the first post-election caucus meeting by Western Australian MP Tom Burke. Despite Burke not lobbying any of his colleagues in advance or organise any formal support, he polled fairly well, leading to speculation that had a more prominent challenger to Evatt stood they may well have won.

On 5 October 1954 Evatt gave an aggressive speech against 'disloyal elements' within the Labor Party, which aimed "to deflect the Labor Movement from the pursuit of established Labor objectives and ideals." The speech caused ructions within the ALP leading many to question Evatt's position.

Labor's caucus rejected by 52 to 28 votes a motion for a spill moved by Senators George Cole and James Fraser. Deputy leader Arthur Calwell and Allan Fraser would have stood for election as Leader and deputy leader respectively in the event of a spill occurring. After the ballot, Evatt insisted on counting the names for and against, which only furthered his opponents animosity.

== See also ==
- 1954 Australian federal election
- Australian Labor Party split of 1955
