= George Cole (Tasmanian politician) =

Australian politician

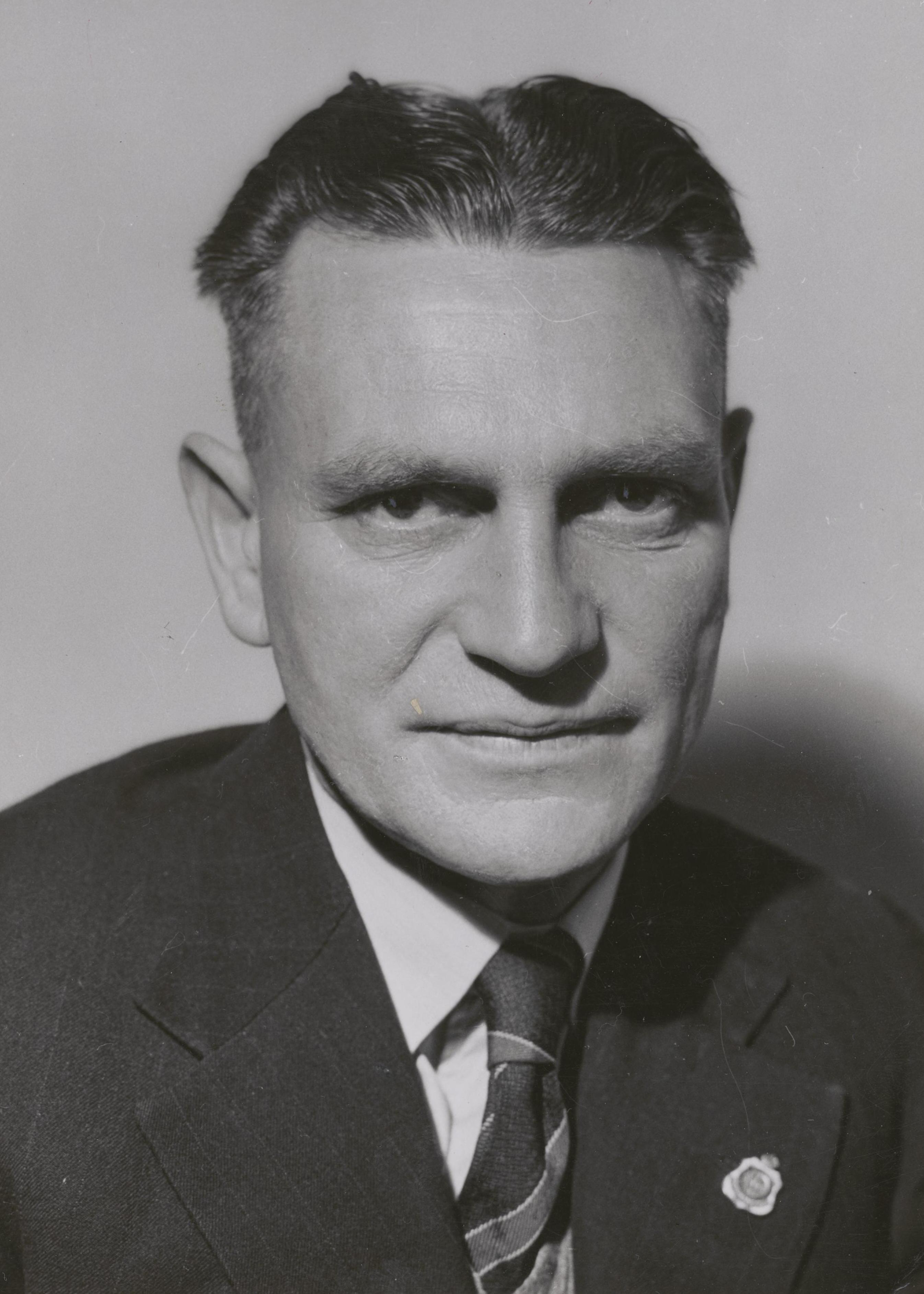

Leader of the Democratic Labor Party
- In office 8 May 1956 – 23 June 1965
- Deputy: Frank McManus
- Preceded by: Bob Joshua
- Succeeded by: Vince Gair

Senator for Tasmania
- In office 22 February 1950 – 30 June 1965

Personal details
- Born: 9 February 1908 Don, Tasmania, Australia
- Died: 23 January 1969 (aged 60) Latrobe, Tasmania, Australia
- Party: Labor (1949–55); Labor (A-C) (1955–57); DLP (1957–65)

George Ronald Cole (9 February 1908 – 23 January 1969) was an Australian politician who served as a Senator for Tasmania from 1950 to 1965. He was initially elected to parliament as a member of the Australian Labor Party (ALP). He joined the Australian Labor Party (Anti-Communist) after the party split of 1955, which became the Democratic Labor Party (DLP). He served as the DLP's parliamentary leader until losing his seat at the 1964 election.

== Early life ==
Cole was born on 9 February 1908 in Don, Tasmania, one of five children born to Alice (née Rutter) and George Cole. He was educated at Devonport High School and later studied at the University of Tasmania and Hobart Teachers' College. He was raised in his mother's Methodist faith but later converted to Catholicism.

Cole played for the New Town Football Club in the Tasmanian Australian National Football League as a centreman. He won the Wilson Bailey Medal as the league's best and fairest player in 1928 and represented Tasmania at the 1930 National Carnival. His football earnings helped his family survive the Great Depression.

In 1932, Cole was appointed head teacher at Upper Mountain River, a rural locality. In the same year, he married Kathleen Cuttriss. He was an assistant teacher at West Devonport from 1938 until 1941, when he was called up to the Australian Army; he had previously been a member of the Citizen Military Forces. Cole served as an instructor in the north of Australia with the 30th Australian Infantry Training Battalion. He was discharged in 1944 and returned to teaching. He served as headmaster of primary schools in Strahan, Longford, and Latrobe.

== Politics ==
=== Australian Labor Party ===
Cole was the president of the Latrobe branch of the Australian Labor Party (ALP). He was elected to the Senate at the 1949 federal election, which saw the number of senators in each state increased from six to ten. He was the seventh senator elected in Tasmania. Cole's first speech in the Senate outlined his opposition to communism, which he described as a "pernicious doctrine" based on the denial of God. However, he believed the Menzies Government's Communist Party Dissolution Bill was likely to be ineffective, as it would force communists underground.

Cole served on the ALP Federal Executive in 1952 and 1953. He allied himself with the anti-communist Groupers and formed the belief that the party's federal leader H. V. Evatt was a communist fellow traveller. In October 1954, he moved for a leadership spill, believing that Arthur Calwell had sufficient numbers to win a challenge. However, the motion was defeated by 24 votes, and Evatt retained the leadership. He was the only Tasmanian to vote for the motion.

=== Democratic Labor Party ===
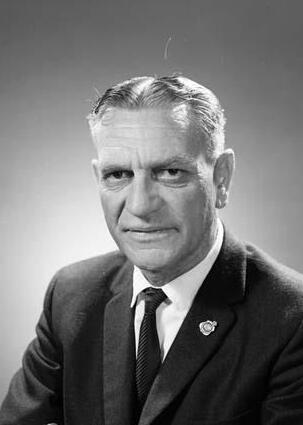
Cole during his Senate tenure

As a result of the party split of 1955, Cole resigned from the ALP on 16 August 1955. On 24 August, he announced in the Senate the formation of the Australian Labor Party (Anti-Communist), with himself and seven lower-house MPs as the parliamentary party. This became the Democratic Labor Party in 1957. The party's members in the House of Representatives were all defeated at the 1955 federal election, where Cole was not up for re-election. He was joined by Frank McManus in the Senate and on 8 May 1956 announced himself as the party's parliamentary leader, with McManus as deputy. They were joined by Condon Byrne of Queensland the following year. Cole was re-elected to the Senate for the DLP at the 1958 federal election with 17 percent of the vote in Tasmania.

Cole was defeated at the 1964 Senate election, losing to Bert Lacey of the ALP by a narrow margin. He unsuccessfully petitioned the Court of Disputed Returns to overturn the result, but Judge Alan Taylor upheld the election of Lacey. He remained the DLP's parliamentary leader until his term expired in June 1965, and campaigned for the party in that capacity at the May 1965 New South Wales state election.

== Later life ==
Cole remained state president of the DLP in Tasmania until June 1968. He died of chronic kidney disease on 23 January 1969, aged 60.
