= Bill Spurling =

Australian rules footballer

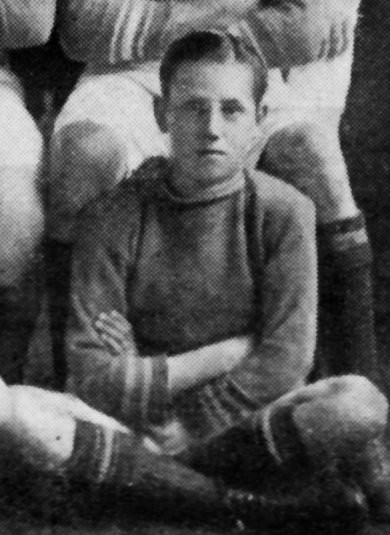

Personal information
- Full name: William David Spurling
- Born: 28 October 1907; Footscray, Victoria
- Died: 13 April 1972 (aged 64); Oakleigh, Victoria
- Original team: Trentham
- Height: 179 cm (5 ft 10 in)
- Weight: 78 kg (172 lb)

Playing career^{1}
Years	Club	Games (Goals)
1928–1935	Footscray	98 (70)
- ^{1} Playing statistics correct to the end of 1935.

William David Spurling (28 October 1907 – 13 April 1972) was an Australian rules footballer who played with Footscray in the Victorian Football League (VFL).

In his early years Spurling grew up in the suburb of Williamstown, Victoria not far from St. Mary's Catholic Church. The family lived in a large house and his father, David, ran a successful tailoring company in Footscray, now known as Spurling Formalwear. At the age of 10 years he was enrolled at St. Joseph's Christian Brothers College, North Melbourne. One year later he played with that schools junior football team, losing only two games for the entire season. That same year Spurling was declared the schools Champion Under 14 Handball player. On leaving school he entered his father's business.

As his abilities strengthened Spurling became a key position player on the football field who was used mostly as a centre half-forward. He kicked a career high 24 goals in 1931 and polled nine Brownlow votes. In the same year he also represented the Victorian interstate team twice.

In 1936 he joined Kyneton in the Bendigo Football League and played in their premiership. He won the league's best and fairest award, the Fred Wood Medal in his first season and in 1939, he was reappointed as their coach.
