= John Scullion =

Australian priest and biblical scholar (1925–1990)

John Scullion SJ
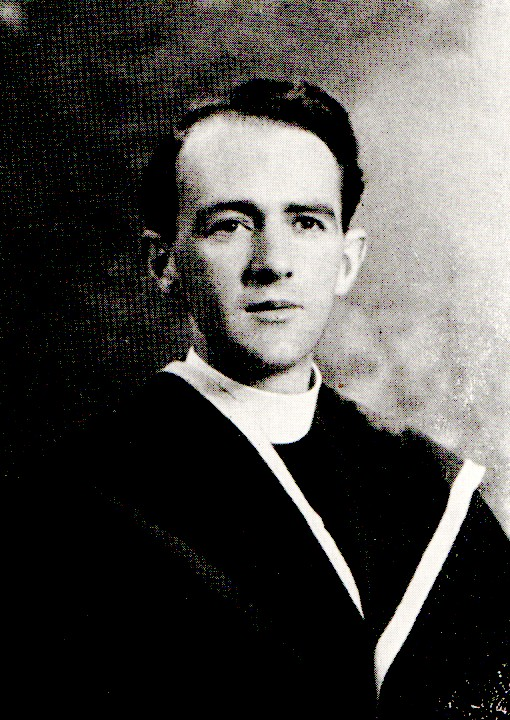
- Born: John James Scullion; 26 February 1925; Melbourne, Australia
- Died: 24 November 1990 (aged 65); Melbourne, Australia
- Resting place: Boroondara General Cemetery
- Education: University of Melbourne
- Known for: Writings on theology

John James Scullion SJ (26 February 1925 – 24 November 1990) was an Australian Jesuit priest and biblical scholar.

== Early years ==
Born in Melbourne in 1925, Scullion was the only son of John William Scullion and Daisy Sarah Scullion (née Sullivan) and had two sisters, Lenore and Franceline. At the time of his birth his father was the hotelkeeper of the Star Hotel, Clarendon Street, South Melbourne but with continuing breaches of the trading laws their licence was revoked at the end of 1929. The family moved to North Melbourne where Scullion attended Saint Joseph's CBC North Melbourne between 1933 and 1938 before moving on to St. Kevin's College, Melbourne to complete his secondary education. By the end of his schooling he was already a gifted speaker winning awards at annual concerts and statewide eisteddfods.

== Career ==
On leaving school Scullion entered the novitiate at Watsonia in February 1942 and later attended the University of Melbourne where he gained a Bachelor of Arts (Hons) in 1951 and a Master of Arts in 1952. Amongst his other awards were the R. G. Wilson Scholarship for Classics and the Seeper Gold Medal for Classics. In 1951 he lectured in Greek at Loyola and in the following year transferred to Saint Ignatius' College, Riverview. Scullion was finally ordained into the Jesuit order in January 1957.

== Later life ==
Scullion became an influential figure in the Jesuit order, successfully lobbying for the creation of a theological college in his home state of Victoria. He went on to become Professor of New Testament and Scripture at that college and was invited to preach at various functions around Australia. Scullion's published works include The Theology of Inspiration (1970), Genesis: A Commentary for Students, Teachers, and Preachers (Old Testament Studies) and Isaiah 40-66 (1982).

Following a long illness with cancer, Scullion died in 1990.
