= 1964 Australian Senate election =

Australian federal election

- 5 December 1964

30 of the 60 seats in the Senate 31 seats needed for a majority
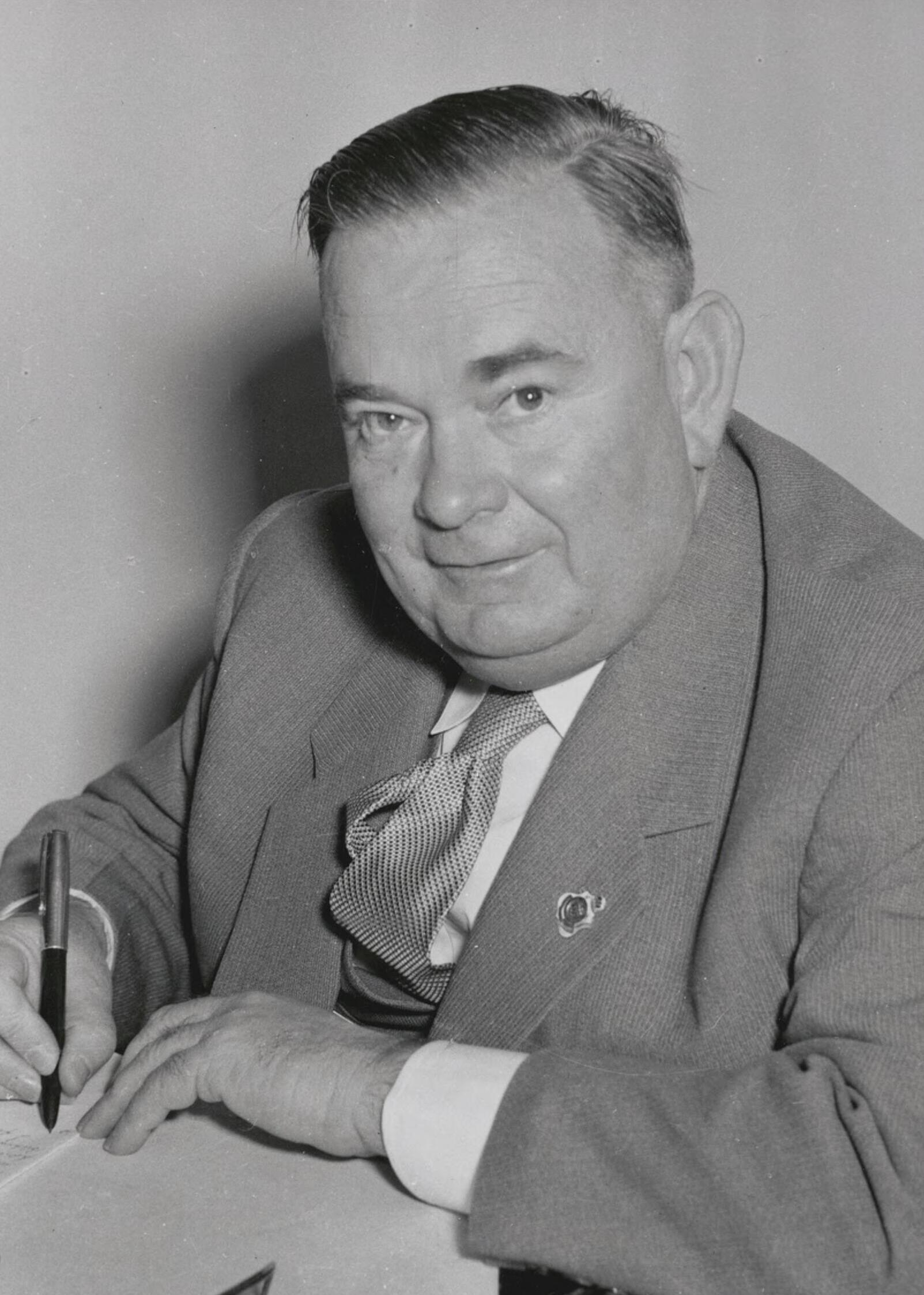

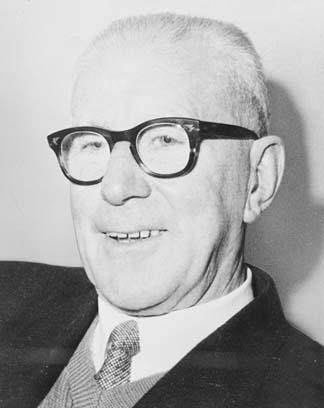

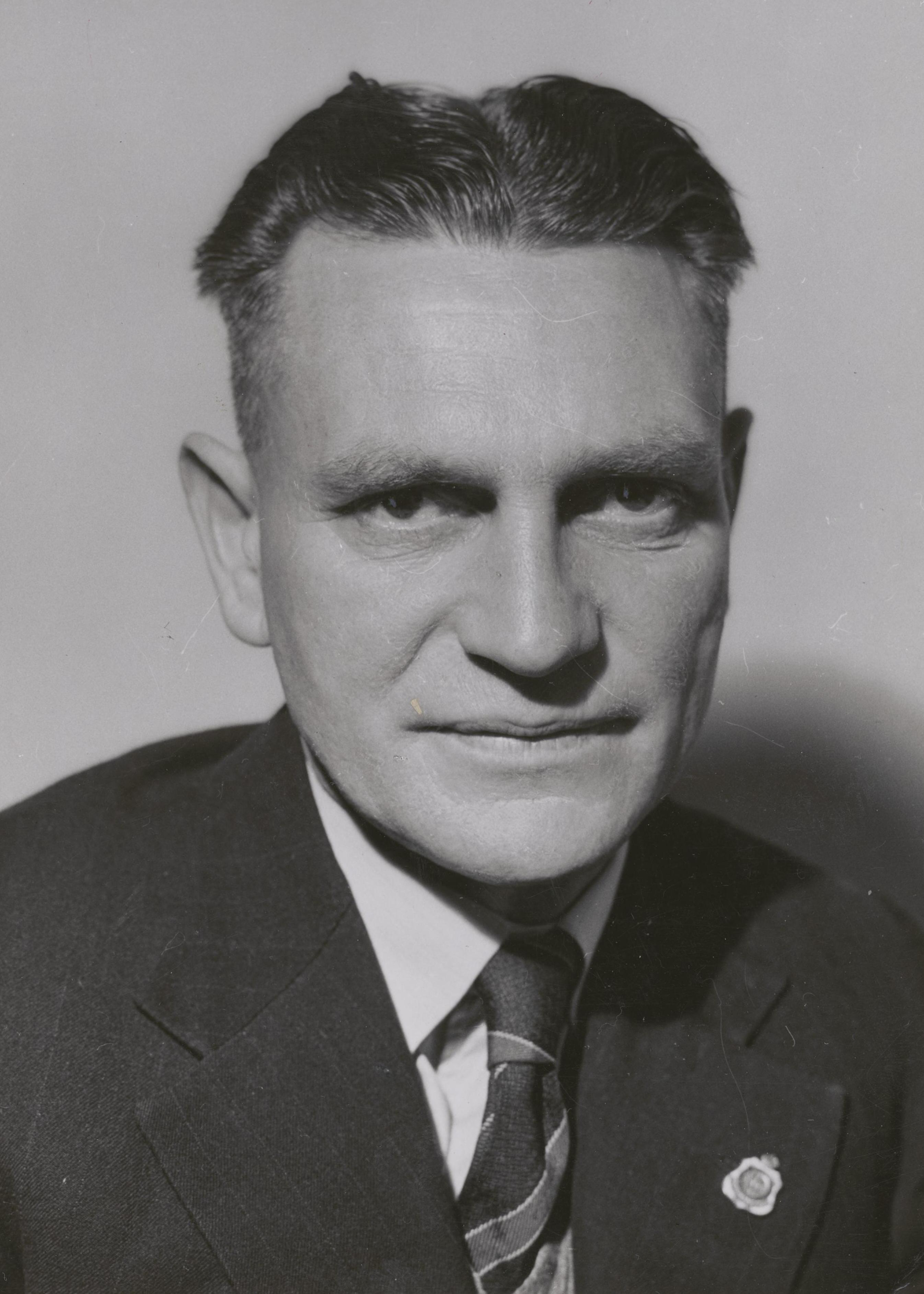
	First party	Second party	Third party
Leader	Shane Paltridge	Nick McKenna	George Cole
Party	Coalition	Labor	Democratic Labor
Leader's seat	Western Australia	Tasmania	Tasmania
Seats before	30	28	1
Seats won	14	14	2
Seats after	30	27	2
Seat change	Steady	▼1	▲1
Popular vote	2,362,081	2,308,670	433,511
Percentage	45.70%	44.66%	8.39%
Swing	▲3.62pp	▼0.04pp	▼1.43pp

Elections were held on 5 December 1964 to elect members to half of the 60 seats in the Australian Senate for a term commencing on 1 July 1965. There was no accompanying election to the House of Representatives, as Robert Menzies had called an early House-only election the previous year. As with the previous Senate election, the Coalition held exactly half of the seats in the chamber; the Democratic Labor Party and independent senator Reg Turnbull held the balance of power.

Senate (STV) — 1964–67—Turnout 94.49% (CV) — Informal 6.98%
Party	Votes	%	Swing	Seats won	Seats held	Change
Liberal–Country coalition (total)	2,362,081	45.70	+3.62	14	30	±0
Liberal–Country joint ticket	1,261,592	24.41	–8.75	5	*	*
Liberal (separate ticket)	1,038,130	20.08	+11.80	8	23	–1
Country (separate ticket)	62,359	1.21	+0.56	1	7	+1
Labor	2,308,670	44.66	–0.04	14	27	–1
Democratic Labor	433,511	8.39	–1.43	2	2	+1
Communist	37,915	0.73	–0.89	0	0	0
Independent / ungrouped	26,873	0.52	–1.25	0	1	0
Total	5,169,050			30	60	

Notes

- In New South Wales and Queensland, the coalition parties ran a joint ticket. Of the five senators elected on a joint ticket, three were members of the Liberal Party and two were members of the Country Party. In Western Australia, the coalition parties ran on separate tickets. In South Australia, Tasmania, and Victoria, only the Liberal Party ran a ticket.
- The sole independent was Reg Turnbull of Tasmania; he did not face re-election in 1964.

== See also ==
- Candidates of the 1964 Australian Senate election
- Members of the Australian Senate, 1965–1968
