= Ray Brew =

Australian rules footballer and coach

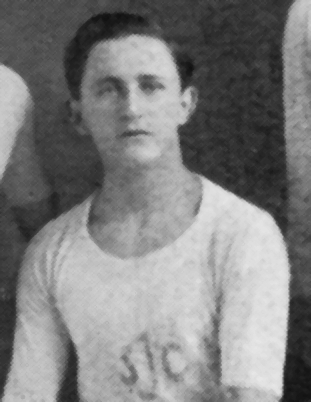

Personal information
- Full name: John Raymond Brew
- Born: 14 January 1903; West Melbourne, Victoria
- Died: 21 August 1979 (aged 76); Melbourne, Victoria
- Original team: West Melbourne
- Debut: Round 3, 1923, Carlton vs. Richmond, at Punt Road
- Height: 175 cm (5 ft 9 in)
- Weight: 83 kg (183 lb)

Playing career^{1}
Years	Club	Games (Goals)
1923–1931	Carlton	118 (31)

Coaching career
Years	Club	Games (W–L–D)
1926, 1928	Carlton	37 (22–15–0)
- ^{1} Playing statistics correct to the end of 1931.

John Raymond Brew (14 January 1903 – 21 August 1979) was an Australian rules footballer who played for and coached Carlton in the Victorian Football League.

Brew grew up in the suburb of West Melbourne where his father Michael was a hotelkeeper. He first attended St Mary's Primary School, West Melbourne before moving to St. Joseph's Christian Brothers' College, North Melbourne where he was a pupil between 1914 and 1920. During his teenage years he performed in numerous school concerts in a variety of roles ranging from elocutionist, piano player and Shakespearean actor. While at school he developed into a fine athlete but did not let his studies suffer as a consequence of his sporting interests. In 1919 he was captain of the school athletics team, played handball to championship level and was a valuable team member in the senior football squad. In 1920 he was voted Captain of the College and achieved Dux of College. He left St. Joseph's and completed his schooling at St Kevin's College before going to university with a Newman Scholarship.

Brew eventually gained a Bachelor of Law but never let the sporting side of his life fade away. At the end of 1922 he finished a season as captain of the junior C.W.M.S. league team of West Melbourne and shortly after made his debut for the Carlton Football Club in Round 3 of the 1923 season. In 1931 Brew was made a Life Member of the Carlton Football club in 1931 however ongoing problems with injury made his role increasingly difficult. He formally retired from the game early in 1932 due to a knee injury which occurred towards the end of the previous season.

During the Second World War he served with the Australian Army, rising to the rank of Captain by 1945. In 1943 he was married in South Australia while stationed there during the war. His interest in horse racing increased and by the 1960s it was taking up a larger part of his time as both an owner and trainer.
