= Doug Reynolds (footballer) =

Australian rules footballer (1933–2026)

Personal information
- Full name: Douglas Reynolds
- Born: 4 September 1933
- Died: 31 January 2026 (aged 92)
- Original team: Spotswood under-18s
- Height: 178 cm (5 ft 10 in)
- Weight: 71 kg (157 lb)
- Position: Centreman

Playing career^{1}
Years	Club	Games (Goals)
1952–1958	Footscray	80 (17)
1958–1959	Richmond	15 (2)
Total		95 (19)
- ^{1} Playing statistics correct to the end of 1959.

Career highlights
- 1954 Footscray premiership player; 1959 Richmond reserves best and fairest; 1960 Sorrento seniors grand finalist; 1960 Sorrento senior best and fairest

Doug Reynolds (4 September 1933 – 31 January 2026) was an Australian rules footballer who played with Footscray and Richmond in the Victorian Football League (VFL) during the 1950s. He played as a centreman in the 1954 VFL Grand Final, kicking a goal in the Bulldogs' first premiership win.
