= St Mary's Primary School, West Melbourne =

St Mary's Primary School

Location
- West Melbourne, Victoria; Australia
- Coordinates: 37°48′22″S 144°57′9″E

Information
- Type: Independent co-educational primary day school with single-sex classes
- Denomination: Roman Catholic
- Established: c. 1855
- Status: Closed
- Closed: 1996
- Grades: 1-8

St Mary's Primary School began life as a Roman Catholic co-educational primary day school with single-sex classes located in West Melbourne, Victoria, Australia. The school was part of the parish of St Mary Star of the Sea, West Melbourne.

As the parish and school populations grew the parish eventually created separate schools for boys and for girls each using the same or similar school name. The original school opened around 1855 and operated from a stone building, built in 1854, which served as both church and school. It is thought to be one of the earliest parish schools established in Victoria. In its later years each school developed its own administrative order, the boys being taught by the Christian Brothers and the girls by nuns. The schools closed in 1996.

== Early history ==
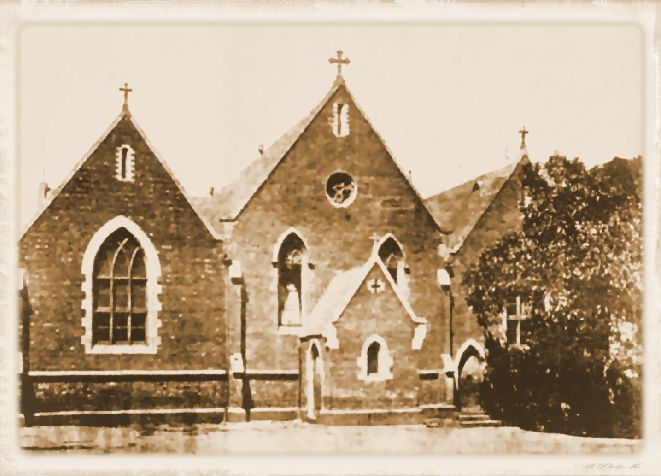
Front view of old St Mary's Catholic Church, West Melbourne. View shows additional side aisles added in the 1870s.Photograph taken around 1900.

Following the discovery of gold in Victoria in the 1850s and the granting of statehood to the Colony, the population of Melbourne rose quickly from 177 at the time of settlement in 1836 to 80,000 in 1854 and just seven years later that figure had risen to 140,000. The needs of the ever-expanding population led to the establishment of places of worship, hospitals and schools. In 1854 a simple single aisled stone church, consisting of a nave and chancel, was constructed on land granted to the Catholic Church in West Melbourne. This building, known as St Mary's Star of the Sea, was to serve a dual purpose as a church on Sundays and a school during weekdays. Although a new, much grander church was opened in 1900, the old church remained in use as a school until 1913 when it was demolished.

Prior to the establishment of a school on the site children merely roamed the streets of West and North Melbourne, often causing some havoc for locals. With pressure from the parish priest the coming of the school was widely welcomed and in the early years the children of St Mary's parish were taught by Catholic lay teachers. Classes were mostly segregated into those for boys, taught by males, and girls taught by women. Students were under the charge of a single teacher who had received their training and certification overseas, to a large extent in Ireland. These ‘head’ teachers were supported by one or two assistants and came under the auspices of the parish priest who also administered the finances.

By 1862 the church could no longer cope with the number wishing to use it and so the building was extended by incorporating a transept into its structure. As the number of school students increased the building was further extended in 1871 and again in 1876 to incorporate two additional aisles. In 1883 the school had over 1200 pupils on its enrolment register; 505 boys and 777 girls.

== The girls school ==
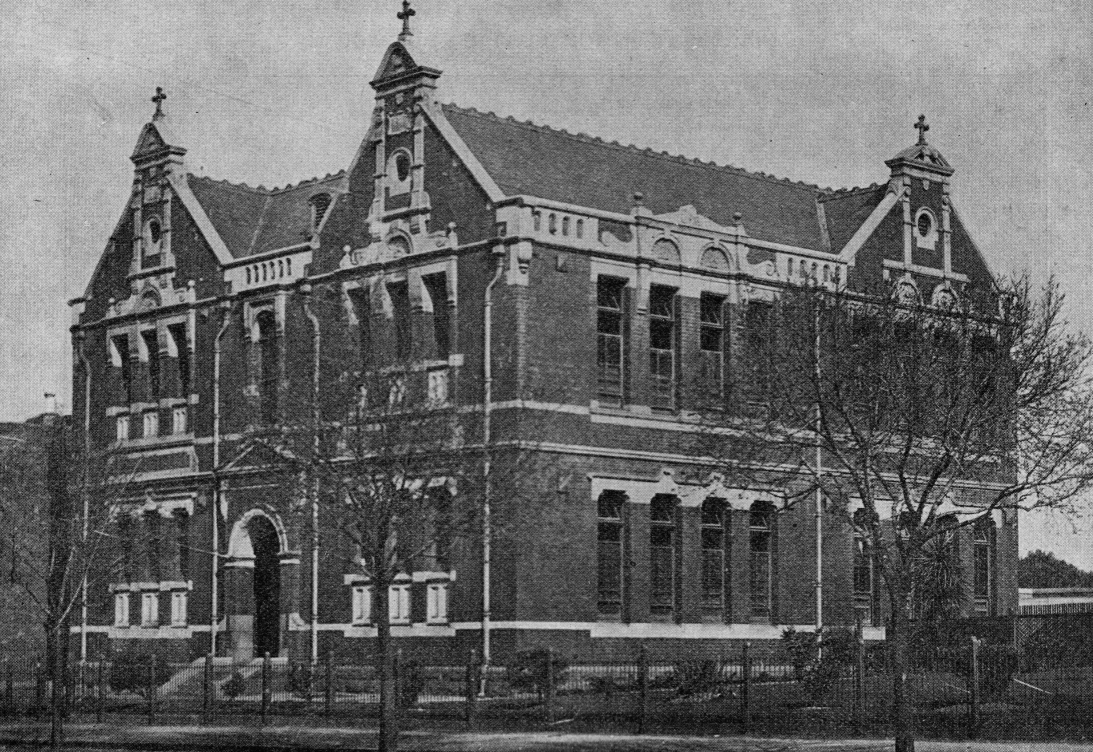
St Mary's Girls Primary School, Victoria Street, West Melbourne c1918.

St Mary's Star of the Sea Girls School began operating in the old church building around 1855. The first certified teacher in charge was Kate Quinn who was working with two assistants by 1860. In 1865 she was replaced by Elizabeth Fogarty (née Griffiths) and in turn she was replaced by Miss Walsh in 1876. In 1871 an additional aisle was added to the old church to cater for the expanding local population. The number of worshippers attending services and an increasing number of school students forced the addition of another aisle in 1876.

The Sisters of Mercy, a religious order of nuns, arrived in Melbourne in 1857 and established a convent in nearby Carlton. Around 1886 they took control of the girls school at West Melbourne and remained there until its closure. The nuns also established a girls college in 1887, St Aloysius' College, under the leadership of Mother Xavier Fallon, in nearby North Melbourne, Victoria when they arrived there only a few months previous.

During the early 1890s plans for a completely new church were well underway, and, hampered only by a lack of funding, work progressed slowly. The new church opened in February 1900 while the old church became both a parish church hall and classroom. By 1907 the school was offering classes for girls up to the Merit Certificate (Grade 8) level. The old building was soon after condemned by the local board of health which necessitated the need to draw up plans to build a new girls school. Demolition of the old church was completed in 1913 and the foundation stone for the new school was laid early the following year. The new school was to cater for 500 students and so a two-story building of red brick, comprising nine classrooms, was constructed on Victoria Street. On 5 July 1914 the building, designed by Kempson and Conolly, was formally opened by Archbishop Mannix.

== The boys school ==
St Mary's Boys school shared the old stone church come school, with removable partitions, with the girls from 1855. The early school was partly staffed by members of the Friendly Brothers Society, a group of Catholic laymen, founded by the Rev. Patrick Geoghegan, who gave their time to helping the Catholic poor, destitute and orphans. One of the Society's founding members was John O'Shanassy, a former Premier of Victoria. The first male teacher was Bernard Owens who was trained in Dublin and came to Australia in the early 1850s Owens was a member of the Society for Denominational Schools which was established to assist teachers in non-government schools and to campaign for equal rights in regards to pay and conditions for both teachers and students. Other teachers included Messrs Spellman, Birmingham, Beardman, Mullen and Cornelius O’Mahony a former Irish political prisoner.

In 1881 Lawrence Egan took charge of a school which had more students than it could reasonably deal with and maintaining funding was an ongoing problem. When the new church opened in 1900 the older building could then be used exclusively for school purposes and in 1902 three teachers from the Congregation of Christian Brothers named Brothers Hogan, Fitzgerald and Le Breton took control of the boys section.

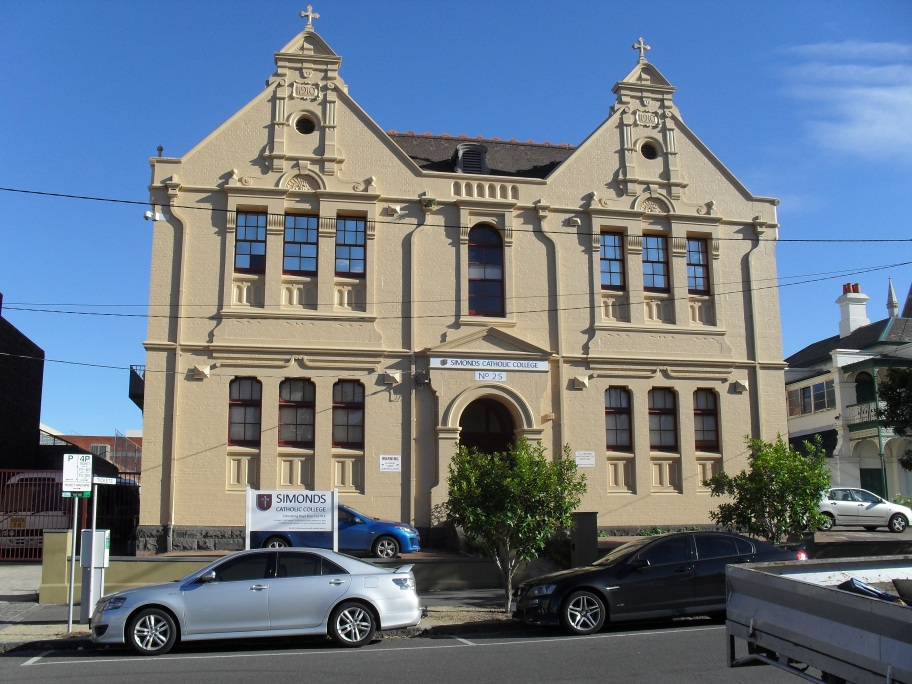
St Mary's Boys' Regional School, Howard street, West Melbourne

Costing some £6700, a new school was formally opened and blessed by Thomas Carr (archbishop of Melbourne) in November 1910. The two story building of brick and comprising eight classrooms, was sometimes referred to as the 'New' primary school. It continued to be conducted by the Christian Brothers for some time as they had earlier established St Joseph's CBC North Melbourne a few streets away. St Joseph's was also to become the residence of the teaching Brothers serving St Mary's, St Joseph's and St George's School in Carlton.

As other local schools were developed the number of boys enrolled began to drop and by 1918 the figure stood at 430 pupils. In 1952 St Mary's, also known as St Mary's Boys Regional School, celebrated its Golden Jubilee with four days of activities. Many old boys and various dignitaries including Arthur Calwell took the opportunity to look over the school and its pupils. Following a merger with Cathedral College, East Melbourne in 1996, St Mary's became part of a new college named Simonds Catholic College and by this time the running of the school had been taken over by the Catholic Education Office in Melbourne.

== Notable alumni ==
- Ray Brew – Australian rules footballer, barrister and sportsman
- Arthur Calwell KCSG – politician and former Labor leader
- Frederick Carwardine – soldier; 6 Battalion; killed in action at Gallipoli in 1915
- Patrick Lyons – bishop
- Timothy McCarthy CBE – priest and Deputy Chaplain General of the Armed Forces
- Frank McManus – politician
- Nicholas Michael O’Donnell – doctor and scholar of Irish culture
