= Candidates of the 1932 Queensland state election =

The 1932 Queensland state election was held on 11 June 1932.

== By-elections ==
- On 26 October 1929, John Blackley (CPNP) was elected to succeed David Weir (Labor), who had died on 22 September, as the member for Maryborough.
- On 10 May 1930, John O'Keefe (Labor) was elected to succeed William McCormack (Labor), who had died on 21 February, as the member for Cairns.
- On 28 June 1930, Arnold Wienholt (Independent) was elected to succeed Ernest Bell (CPNP), who had died on 2 May, as the member for Fassifern.

== Retiring Members ==
- Note: Dalby CPNP MLA Wilfred Russell had died prior to the election; no by-election was held.

=== Labor ===
- Arthur Jones MLA (Burke)
- Mick Kirwan MLA (Brisbane)
- Vern Winstanley MLA (Queenton)
- Alfred Jones MLA (Paddington) – did not contest initial election but subsequently endorsed for the supplementary election in Hamilton following the death of the original Labor candidate

=== CPNP ===
- Richard Bow MLA (Mitchell)
- Robert Boyd MLA (Burnett)
- William Carter MLA (Fitzroy)
- Charles Jamieson MLA (Lockyer) – elected as Independent
- George Tedman MLA (Maree)
- Richard Warren MLA (Murrumba)

== Candidates ==
Sitting members at the time of the election are shown in bold text.

Electorate	Held by	Labor candidate	CPNP candidate	Other candidates
Albert	CPNP	Henry Wilson	**Tom Plunkett**	
Aubigny	CPNP	Benjamin Costin	**Arthur Moore**	
Barcoo	Labor	**Frank Bulcock**		
Bowen	Labor	**Charles Collins**	Thomas Mann	
Bremer	Labor	**Frank Cooper**		
Brisbane	Labor	Robert Funnell	George Mocatta	William Allen (QP); Herbert Carrigan (LL); Marion Steel (Ind)
Bulimba	CPNP	William Copley	**Irene Longman**	Bernie Besant (CPA)
Bundaberg	Labor	**George Barber**		
Buranda	Labor	**Ted Hanson**	Tom Kerr	
Cairns	Labor	**John O'Keefe**	James McDonald	
Carnarvon	CPNP	Paul Hilton	**Edward Costello**	James Ferris (Ind)
Carpentaria	Labor	**John Mullan**		
Charters Towers	Labor	**William Wellington**	Herbert Poole	
Cook	CPNP	William Gardner	**James Kenny**	
Cooroora	CPNP	Roy Reid	**Harry Walker**	
Cunningham	CPNP	John Archibald	**William Deacon**	
Dalby	CPNP	Adolphus Baker	Jim Sparkes	
East Toowoomba	CPNP	James Strohfeld	**Robert Roberts**	Frank Common (Ind)
Enoggera	CPNP	George Taylor	**Jim Kerr**	
Fassifern	Independent			**Arnold Wienholt** (Ind)
Fitzroy	CPNP	Thomas Maher	**Jens Peterson**	Robert Hartley (QP); Clarence Wain (Ind)
Fortitude Valley	Labor	**Thomas Wilson**	John McLennan	
Gregory	Labor	**George Pollock**		
Gympie	CPNP	Thomas Dunstan	**Vivian Tozer**	
Hamilton	CPNP	Herbert Moore (died)	**Hugh Russell**	Alfred Purkiss (QP)
Hamilton	CPNP	**Alfred Jones**	**Hugh Russell**	James Trotter (QP)
Herbert	Labor	**Percy Pease**	Clarence Page	
Ipswich	CPNP	David Gledson	**James Walker**	
Isis	CPNP	Albert Jones	**William Brand**	John Murray (QP)
Ithaca	Labor	**Ned Hanlon**	Thomas Thatcher	
Kelvin Grove	CPNP	Frank Waters	**Richard Hill**	Andrew Knox (QP); Keith Richards (CPA)
Kennedy	CPNP	Patrick Hayes	Arthur Fadden	
Keppel	CPNP	William Clayton	**Owen Daniel**	
Kurilpa	CPNP	Kerry Copley	**James Fry**	Hans Bang (Ind)
Logan	CPNP	Joe Cranitch	**Reginald King**	Patrick Coffey (Ind Lab)
Mackay	Labor	**William Forgan Smith**	Alexander Mackay	Arthur Williams (Ind)
Maranoa	Labor	**Charles Conroy**	Ernest Thomas	Daniel O'Brien (QP)
Maree	CPNP	William King	Louis Luckins	John Perry (QP); Hugh Phair (SC)
Maryborough	Labor	**James Stopford**	**John Blackley**	Harold McElligott (CPA); Alan Price (Ind)
Merthyr	CPNP	James Keogh	**Patrick Kerwin**	Kenneth McDonald (LL)
Mirani	CPNP	Alexander Gardner	**Edward Swayne**	Peter McCowan (QP)
Mundingburra	Labor	**John Dash**	John Garbutt	
Murilla	CPNP	**Samuel Brassington**	**Godfrey Morgan**	
Murrumba	CPNP	David Moorcroft	Frank Nicklin	William Bradley (QP)
Nanango	CPNP	Thomas Reordan	**Jim Edwards**	George Young (Ind)
Normanby	CPNP	**Tom Foley**	Thomas O'Brien	
Nundah	CPNP	John Hayes	**William Kelso**	Jack MacDonald (Ind)
Oxley	CPNP	James MacArthur	**Thomas Nimmo**	
Port Curtis	CPNP	Tommy Williams	**Frank Butler**	
Rockhampton	Independent	James Larcombe		Joseph Conachan (Ind); **Thomas Dunlop** (Ind)
Sandgate	CPNP	Herbert McPhail	**Hubert Sizer**	Benjamin White (QP)
South Brisbane	CPNP	Vince Gair	**Neil MacGroarty**	Joseph Clancy (QP)
Stanley	CPNP	Francis Staunton	**Ernest Grimstone**	Ernest Cannell (Ind)
The Tableland	CPNP	**Harry Bruce**	**Ernest Atherton**	
Toowong	CPNP	Edward Turner	**James Maxwell**	Charles Graves (Ind); James Trotter (QP)
Toowoomba	CPNP	Evan Llewelyn	**James Annand**	Fred Paterson (CPA)
Townsville	Labor	**Maurice Hynes**		John Burns (Ind); Douglas Price (CPA)
Warrego	Labor	**Randolph Bedford**	John Fletcher	John Kerr (Ind Lab)
Warwick	CPNP	John Healy	**George Barnes**	Alice Chambers (QP)
West Moreton	CPNP	Lorenz Krebs	**Ted Maher**	William Cooper (Ind); Christy Littman (QP)
Wide Bay	CPNP	John Brown	**Harry Clayton**	
Windsor	CPNP	Ernest Manchester	**Charles Taylor**	Francis Corbett (Ind); Donald MacKenzie (Ind Lab)
Wynnum	CPNP	John Donnelly	**Walter Barnes**	William Argaet (QP)

== See also ==
- 1932 Queensland state election
- Members of the Queensland Legislative Assembly, 1929–1932
- Members of the Queensland Legislative Assembly, 1932–1935
- List of political parties in Australia
