= Results of the 1932 Queensland state election =

Queensland state election, 11 June 1932 Legislative Assembly << 1929–1935 >>
Enrolled voters	492,036				
Votes cast	456,706		Turnout	92.82%	+3.67%
Informal votes	5,144		Informal	1.13%	–0.43%
Summary of votes by party
Party	Primary votes	%	Swing	Seats	Change
Labor	225,270	49.89%	+9.73%	33	+5
CPNP	204,158	45.21%	–9.02%	28	-15
Queensland Party	7,590	1.68%	+1.68%	0	± 0
Independent Labor	1,831	0.41%	+0.41%	0	± 0
Communist	1,057	0.23%	–0.45%	0	± 0
Lang Labor	587	0.13%	+0.13%	0	± 0
Independent	11,069	2.45%	–2.42%	1	– 1
Total	451,562			62	

This is a list of electoral district results for the 1932 Queensland state election.

At the time, the voting system in Queensland was based on contingency voting, which was similar to the modern optional preferential voting system. In electorates with 3 or more candidates, preferences were not distributed if a candidate received more than 50% of the primary vote.

If none received more than 50%, all except the top two candidates were eliminated from the count and their preferences distributed between the two leaders, with the one receiving the most votes declared the winner.

== Results by electoral district ==
=== Albert ===
1932 Queensland state election: Albert
Party	Candidate	Votes	%	±%
CPNP	Tom Plunkett	4,920	63.3	
Labor	Henry Wilson	2,847	36.7	
Total formal votes		7,767	99.6	
Informal votes		33	0.4	
Turnout		7,800	94.2	
CPNP hold		Swing		

=== Aubigny ===
1932 Queensland state election: Aubigny
Party	Candidate	Votes	%	±%
CPNP	Arthur Moore	4,806	66.7	
Labor	Benjamin Costin	2,394	33.3	
Total formal votes		7,200	99.3	
Informal votes		49	0.7	
Turnout		7,249	96.4	
CPNP hold		Swing		

=== Barcoo ===
1932 Queensland state election: Barcoo
Party	Candidate	Votes	%	±%
Labor	Frank Bulcock	unopposed		
Labor hold		Swing		

=== Bowen ===
1932 Queensland state election: Bowen
Party	Candidate	Votes	%	±%
Labor	Charles Collins	3,926	57.1	
CPNP	Thomas Mann	2,948	42.9	
Total formal votes		6,874	98.9	
Informal votes		78	1.1	
Turnout		6,952	94.8	
Labor hold		Swing		

=== Bremer ===
1932 Queensland state election: Bremer
Party	Candidate	Votes	%	±%
Labor	Frank Cooper	unopposed		
Labor hold		Swing		

=== Brisbane ===
1932 Queensland state election: Brisbane
Party	Candidate	Votes	%	±%
Labor	Robert Funnell	5,479	59.9	
CPNP	George Mocatta	2,839	31.0	
Lang Labor	Herbert Carrigan	400	4.4	
Independent	Marion Steel	180	2.0	
Queensland Party	William Allen	172	1.9	
Total formal votes		9,142	97.1	
Informal votes		277	2.9	
Turnout		9,419	87.7	
Labor hold		Swing		

- Preferences were not distributed.

=== Bulimba ===
1932 Queensland state election: Bulimba
Party	Candidate	Votes	%	±%
Labor	William Copley	5,919	62.8	
CPNP	Irene Longman	3,320	35.2	
Communist	Bernie Besant	193	2.0	
Total formal votes		9,432	99.1	
Informal votes		89	0.9	
Turnout		9,521	94.5	
Labor gain from CPNP		Swing		

- Preferences were not distributed.

=== Bundaberg ===
1932 Queensland state election: Bundaberg
Party	Candidate	Votes	%	±%
Labor	George Barber	unopposed		
Labor hold		Swing		

=== Buranda ===
1932 Queensland state election: Buranda
Party	Candidate	Votes	%	±%
Labor	Ted Hanson	5,722	66.0	
CPNP	Tom Kerr	2,947	34.0	
Total formal votes		8,669	98.8	
Informal votes		106	1.2	
Turnout		8,775	86.1	
Labor hold		Swing		

=== Cairns ===
1932 Queensland state election: Cairns
Party	Candidate	Votes	%	±%
Labor	John O'Keefe	5,354	65.3	
CPNP	James McDonald	2,850	34.7	
Total formal votes		8,204	99.3	
Informal votes		60	0.7	
Turnout		8,264	94.1	
Labor hold		Swing		

=== Carnarvon ===
1932 Queensland state election: Carnarvon
Party	Candidate	Votes	%	±%
CPNP	Edward Costello	3,214	46.8	
Labor	Paul Hilton	3,032	44.2	
Independent	James Ferris	621	9.0	
Total formal votes		6,867	99.2	
Informal votes		54	0.8	
Turnout		6,921	93.8	
Two-party-preferred result
CPNP	Edward Costello	3,547	52.7	
Labor	Paul Hilton	3,186	47.3	
CPNP hold		Swing		

=== Carpentaria ===
1932 Queensland state election: Carpentaria
Party	Candidate	Votes	%	±%
Labor	John Mullan	unopposed		
Labor hold		Swing		

=== Charters Towers ===
1932 Queensland state election: Charters Towers
Party	Candidate	Votes	%	±%
Labor	William Wellington	4,580	63.6	
CPNP	Herbert Poole	2,621	36.4	
Total formal votes		7,201	98.9	
Informal votes		81	1.1	
Turnout		7,282	91.9	
Labor hold		Swing		

=== Cook ===
1932 Queensland state election: Cook
Party	Candidate	Votes	%	±%
CPNP	James Kenny	3,742	50.4	
Labor	William Gardner	3,684	49.6	
Total formal votes		7,426	98.7	
Informal votes		94	1.3	
Turnout		7,520	92.9	
CPNP hold		Swing		

=== Cooroora ===
1932 Queensland state election: Cooroora
Party	Candidate	Votes	%	±%
CPNP	Harry Walker	4,516	68.4	
Labor	Roy Reid	2,087	31.6	
Total formal votes		6,603	99.3	
Informal votes		49	0.7	
Turnout		6,652	88.0	
CPNP hold		Swing		

=== Cunningham ===
1932 Queensland state election: Cunningham
Party	Candidate	Votes	%	±%
CPNP	William Deacon	4,767	66.8	
Labor	John Archibald	2,369	33.2	
Total formal votes		7,136	99.3	
Informal votes		51	0.7	
Turnout		7,187	92.3	
CPNP hold		Swing		

=== Dalby ===
1932 Queensland state election: Dalby
Party	Candidate	Votes	%	±%
CPNP	Jim Sparkes	3,904	53.8	
Labor	Adolphus Baker	3,349	46.2	
Total formal votes		7,253	99.2	
Informal votes		56	0.8	
Turnout		7,309	93.3	
CPNP hold		Swing		

=== East Toowoomba ===
1932 Queensland state election: East Toowoomba
Party	Candidate	Votes	%	±%
CPNP	Robert Roberts	4,005	49.3	
Labor	James Strohfeld	3,347	41.2	
Independent	Frank Common	773	9.5	
Total formal votes		8,125	99.0	
Informal votes		79	1.0	
Turnout		8,204	94.6	
Two-party-preferred result
CPNP	Robert Roberts	4,337	55.4	
Labor	James Strohfeld	3,485	44.6	
CPNP hold		Swing		

==== By-election ====
- This by-election was caused by the death of Robert Roberts. It was held on 18 August 1934.

1934 East Toowoomba state by-election
Party	Candidate	Votes	%	±%
CPNP	James Annand	4,227	51.0	+1.7
Labor	James Kane	4,055	49.0	+7.8
Total formal votes		8,282		
Informal votes				
Turnout				
CPNP hold		Swing	−4.4	

=== Enoggera ===
1932 Queensland state election: Enoggera
Party	Candidate	Votes	%	±%
Labor	George Taylor	4,576	52.2	
CPNP	Jim Kerr	4,184	47.8	
Total formal votes		8,760	99.0	
Informal votes		92	1.0	
Turnout		8,852	95.2	
Labor gain from CPNP		Swing		

=== Fassifern ===
1932 Queensland state election: Fassifern
Party	Candidate	Votes	%	±%
Independent	Arnold Wienholt	unopposed		
Independent gain from CPNP		Swing		

=== Fitzroy ===
1932 Queensland state election: Fitzroy
Party	Candidate	Votes	%	±%
CPNP	Jens Peterson	3,685	49.8	
Labor	Thomas Maher	3,413	46.2	
Queensland Party	Robert Hartley	254	3.4	
Independent	Clarence Wain	40	0.5	
Total formal votes		7,392	99.1	
Informal votes		69	0.9	
Turnout		7,461	95.4	
Two-party-preferred result
CPNP	Jens Peterson	3,763	52.1	
Labor	Thomas Maher	3,452	47.8	
CPNP hold		Swing		

=== Fortitude Valley ===
1932 Queensland state election: Fortitude Valley
Party	Candidate	Votes	%	±%
Labor	Thomas Wilson	6,417	69.2	
CPNP	John McLennan	2,851	30.8	
Total formal votes		9,268	98.6	
Informal votes		128	1.4	
Turnout		9,396	90.3	
Labor hold		Swing		

==== By-election ====
- This by-election was caused by the death of Thomas Wilson. It was held on 15 July 1933.

1933 Fortitude Valley state by-election
Party	Candidate	Votes	%	±%
Labor	Samuel Brassington	6,247	66.2	−3.0
Independent Country	John McLennan	1,903	20.2	+20.2
Industrial Labor	Charles McLarry	557	6.0	+6.0
Independent	Daniel Miller	379	4.0	+4.0
Independent Labor	Albert Thompson	350	3.7	+3.7
Total formal votes		9,436		
Informal votes				
Turnout				
Labor hold		Swing	N/A	

=== Gregory ===
1932 Queensland state election: Gregory
Party	Candidate	Votes	%	±%
Labor	George Pollock	unopposed		
Labor hold		Swing		

=== Gympie ===
1932 Queensland state election: Gympie
Party	Candidate	Votes	%	±%
CPNP	Vivian Tozer	4,116	51.5	
Labor	Thomas Dunstan	3,869	48.5	
Total formal votes		7,985	99.5	
Informal votes		36	0.5	
Turnout		8,021	94.1	
CPNP hold		Swing		

=== Hamilton ===
1932 Queensland state election: Hamilton
Party	Candidate	Votes	%	±%
CPNP	Hugh Russell	5,202	58.9	
Labor	Alfred Jones	3,533	40.0	
Queensland Party	James Trotter	100	1.1	
Total formal votes		8,835	99.1	
Informal votes		76	0.9	
Turnout		8,911	87.5	
CPNP hold		Swing		

- Preferences were not distributed.

=== Herbert ===
1932 Queensland state election: Herbert
Party	Candidate	Votes	%	±%
Labor	Percy Pease	4,573	66.5	
CPNP	Clarence Page	2,307	33.5	
Total formal votes		6,880	98.1	
Informal votes		134	1.9	
Turnout		7,014	90.3	
Labor hold		Swing		

=== Ipswich ===
1932 Queensland state election: Ipswich
Party	Candidate	Votes	%	±%
Labor	David Gledson	5,081	59.3	
CPNP	James Walker	3,492	40.7	
Total formal votes		8,573	99.1	
Informal votes		74	0.9	
Turnout		8,647	95.8	
Labor gain from CPNP		Swing		

=== Isis ===
1932 Queensland state election: Isis
Party	Candidate	Votes	%	±%
CPNP	William Brand	3,868	56.2	
Labor	Albert Jones	2,569	37.3	
Queensland Party	John Murray	442	6.4	
Total formal votes		6,879	99.0	
Informal votes		71	1.0	
Turnout		6,950	95.7	
CPNP hold		Swing		

- Preferences were not distributed.

=== Ithaca ===
1932 Queensland state election: Ithaca
Party	Candidate	Votes	%	±%
Labor	Ned Hanlon	5,497	59.6	
CPNP	Thomas Thatcher	3,722	40.4	
Total formal votes		9,219	99.3	
Informal votes		69	0.7	
Turnout		9,288	93.9	
Labor hold		Swing		

=== Kelvin Grove ===
1932 Queensland state election: Kelvin Grove
Party	Candidate	Votes	%	±%
Labor	Frank Waters	5,305	56.7	
CPNP	Richard Hill	3,647	38.9	
Queensland Party	Andrew Knox	337	3.6	
Communist	Keith Richards	76	0.8	
Total formal votes		9,365	99.4	
Informal votes		55	0.6	
Turnout		9,420	94.1	
Labor gain from CPNP		Swing		

- Preferences were not distributed.

=== Kennedy ===
1932 Queensland state election: Kennedy
Party	Candidate	Votes	%	±%
CPNP	Arthur Fadden	3,747	50.6	
Labor	Patrick Hayes	3,653	49.4	
Total formal votes		7,400	98.4	
Informal votes		119	1.6	
Turnout		7,519	92.2	
CPNP gain from Labor		Swing		

=== Keppel ===
1932 Queensland state election: Keppel
Party	Candidate	Votes	%	±%
CPNP	Owen Daniel	3,839	51.6	
Labor	William Clayton	3,653	48.4	
Total formal votes		7,443	98.8	
Informal votes		92	1.2	
Turnout		7,535	95.6	
CPNP hold		Swing		

=== Kurilpa ===
1932 Queensland state election: Kurilpa
Party	Candidate	Votes	%	±%
Labor	Kerry Copley	5,177	56.5	
CPNP	James Fry	3,826	41.8	
Independent	Hans Bang	157	1.7	
Total formal votes		9,160	97.2	
Informal votes		263	2.8	
Turnout		9,423	92.4	
Labor gain from CPNP		Swing		

=== Logan ===
1932 Queensland state election: Logan
Party	Candidate	Votes	%	±%
CPNP	Reginald King	4,301	50.1	
Labor	Joe Cranitch	4,087	47.6	
Independent Labor	Patrick Coffey	191	2.2	
Total formal votes		8,579	99.0	
Informal votes		84	1.0	
Turnout		8,663	94.7	
CPNP hold		Swing		

- Preferences were not distributed.

=== Mackay ===
1932 Queensland state election: Mackay
Party	Candidate	Votes	%	±%
Labor	William Forgan Smith	4,535	61.4	
CPNP	Alexander Mackay	2,670	36.1	
Independent	Arthur Williams	183	2.5	
Total formal votes		7,388	98.7	
Informal votes		99	1.3	
Turnout		7,487	88.1	
Labor hold		Swing		

- Preferences were not distributed.

=== Maranoa ===
1932 Queensland state election: Maranoa
Party	Candidate	Votes	%	±%
Labor	Charles Conroy	4,148	62.2	
CPNP	Ernest Thomas	2,360	35.4	
Queensland Party	Daniel O'Brien	164	2.5	
Total formal votes		6,672	99.0	
Informal votes		70	1.0	
Turnout		6,742	90.2	
Labor hold		Swing		

- Preferences were not distributed.

=== Maree ===
1932 Queensland state election: Maree
Party	Candidate	Votes	%	±%
Labor	William King	5,025	54.6	
CPNP	Louis Luckins	3,891	42.2	
Queensland Party	John Perry	163	1.8	
Social Credit	Hugh Phair	133	1.4	
Total formal votes		9,212	99.1	
Informal votes		82	0.9	
Turnout		9,294	93.2	
Labor gain from CPNP		Swing		

- Preferences were not distributed.

=== Maryborough ===
1932 Queensland state election: Maryborough
Party	Candidate	Votes	%	±%
Labor	James Stopford	4,862	58.7	
CPNP	John Blackley	2,748	33.2	
Independent	Alan Price	425	5.1	
Communist	Harold McElligott	243	2.9	
Total formal votes		8,278	97.2	
Informal votes		235	2.8	
Turnout		8,513	96.1	
Labor hold		Swing		

- Preferences were not distributed.

=== Merthyr ===
1932 Queensland state election: Merthyr
Party	Candidate	Votes	%	±%
Labor	James Keogh	4,780	51.6	
CPNP	Patrick Kerwin	4,293	46.4	
Lang Labor	Kenneth McDonald	187	2.0	
Total formal votes		9,259	99.4	
Informal votes		54	0.6	
Turnout		9,313	84.0	
Labor gain from CPNP		Swing		

- Preferences were not distributed.

=== Mirani ===
1932 Queensland state election: Mirani
Party	Candidate	Votes	%	±%
CPNP	Edward Swayne	3,083	45.7	
Labor	Alexander Gardner	2,958	43.8	
Queensland Party	Peter McCowan	711	10.5	
Total formal votes		6,752	99.2	
Informal votes		56	0.8	
Turnout		6,808	92.1	
Two-party-preferred result
CPNP	Edward Swayne	3,549	53.6	
Labor	Alexander Gardner	3,076	46.4	
CPNP hold		Swing		

=== Mundingburra ===
1932 Queensland state election: Mundingburra
Party	Candidate	Votes	%	±%
Labor	John Dash	4,921	66.9	
CPNP	John Garbutt	2,434	33.1	
Total formal votes		7,355	99.2	
Informal votes		58	0.8	
Turnout		7,413	94.4	
Labor hold		Swing		

=== Murilla ===
1932 Queensland state election: Murilla
Party	Candidate	Votes	%	±%
CPNP	Godfrey Morgan	3,898	58.6	
Labor	Samuel Brassington	2,753	41.4	
Total formal votes		6,651	98.7	
Informal votes		90	1.3	
Turnout		6,741	94.1	
CPNP hold		Swing		

=== Murrumba ===
1932 Queensland state election: Murrumba
Party	Candidate	Votes	%	±%
CPNP	Frank Nicklin	4,206	61.1	
Labor	David Moorcroft	2,271	33.0	
Queensland Party	William Bradley	410	5.9	
Total formal votes		6,887	98.7	
Informal votes		88	1.3	
Turnout		6,975	93.3	
CPNP hold		Swing		

- Preferences were not distributed.

=== Nanango ===
1932 Queensland state election: Nanango
Party	Candidate	Votes	%	±%
CPNP	Jim Edwards	4,162	56.3	
Labor	Thomas Reordan	2,442	33.0	
Independent	G.W. Young	791	10.7	
Total formal votes		7,395	99.5	
Informal votes		40	0.5	
Turnout		7,435	94.5	
CPNP hold		Swing		

=== Normanby ===
1932 Queensland state election: Normanby
Party	Candidate	Votes	%	±%
Labor	Tom Foley	4,183	59.9	
CPNP	Thomas O'Brien	2,805	40.1	
Total formal votes		6,988	98.9	
Informal votes		80	1.1	
Turnout		7,068	93.2	
Labor gain from CPNP		Swing		

=== Nundah ===
1932 Queensland state election: Nundah
Party	Candidate	Votes	%	±%
Labor	John Hayes	4,493	51.2	
CPNP	William Kelso	3,933	44.8	
Independent	Jack MacDonald	358	4.1	
Total formal votes		8,784	99.4	
Informal votes		56	0.6	
Turnout		8,840	94.0	
Labor gain from CPNP		Swing		

=== Oxley ===
1932 Queensland state election: Oxley
Party	Candidate	Votes	%	±%
CPNP	Thomas Nimmo	5,294	56.9	
Labor	James MacArthur	4,005	43.1	
Total formal votes		9,2999	98.6	
Informal votes		132	1.4	
Turnout		9,431	94.3	
CPNP hold		Swing		

=== Port Curtis ===
1932 Queensland state election: Port Curtis
Party	Candidate	Votes	%	±%
Labor	Tommy Williams	3,805	51.2	
CPNP	Frank Butler	3,625	48.8	
Total formal votes		7,430	99.5	
Informal votes		39	0.5	
Turnout		7,469	94.9	
Labor gain from CPNP		Swing		

=== Rockhampton ===
1932 Queensland state election: Rockhampton
Party	Candidate	Votes	%	±%
Labor	James Larcombe	5,331	60.7	
Independent	Thomas Dunlop	2,346	26.7	
Independent	Joseph Conachan	1,101	12.5	
Total formal votes		8,778	99.0	
Informal votes		92	1.0	
Turnout		8,870	93.2	
Labor gain from Independent		Swing		

- Preferences were not distributed.

=== Sandgate ===
1932 Queensland state election: Sandgate
Party	Candidate	Votes	%	±%
CPNP	Hubert Sizer	4,711	50.8	
Labor	Herbert McPhail	4,194	45.2	
Queensland Party	Benjamin White	374	4.0	
Total formal votes		9,279	99.2	
Informal votes		76	0.8	
Turnout		9,355	94.7	
CPNP hold		Swing		

- Preferences were not distributed.

=== South Brisbane ===
1932 Queensland state election: South Brisbane
Party	Candidate	Votes	%	±%
Labor	Vince Gair	4,737	52.2	
CPNP	Neil MacGroarty	3,972	43.8	
Queensland Party	Joseph Clancy	364	4.0	
Total formal votes		9,073	98.0	
Informal votes		182	2.0	
Turnout		9,255	94.7	
Labor gain from CPNP		Swing		

=== Stanley ===
1932 Queensland state election: Stanley
Party	Candidate	Votes	%	±%
CPNP	Ernest Grimstone	3,984	56.0	
Labor	Francis Staunton	2,278	32.0	
Independent	Ernest Cannell	834	12.9	
Total formal votes		7,096	99.4	
Informal votes		44	0.6	
Turnout		7,140	95.6	
CPNP hold		Swing		

==== By-election ====
- This by-election was caused by the death of Ernest Grimstone. It was held on 9 December 1933.

1933 Stanley state by-election
Party	Candidate	Votes	%	±%
CPNP	Roy Bell	4,336	68.3	+12.3
Independent	Alfred Langdon	2,013	31.7	+31.7
Total formal votes		6,349	97.3	−2.1
Informal votes		177	2.7	+2.1
Turnout		6,526	83.0	−12.6
CPNP hold		Swing	N/A	

=== The Tableland ===
1932 Queensland state election: The Tableland
Party	Candidate	Votes	%	±%
Labor	Harry Bruce	3,664	52.1	
CPNP	Ernest Atherton	3,375	47.9	
Total formal votes		7,039	98.2	
Informal votes		126	1.8	
Turnout		7,165	93.4	
Labor gain from CPNP		Swing		

=== Toowong ===
1932 Queensland state election: Toowong
Party	Candidate	Votes	%	±%
CPNP	James Maxwell	5,354	58.9	
Labor	Edward Turner	3,105	34.2	
Queensland Party	James Trotter	428	4.7	
Independent	Charles Graves	196	2.2	
Total formal votes		9,083	99.3	
Informal votes		61	0.7	
Turnout		9,144	94.0	
CPNP hold		Swing		

- Preferences were not distributed.

=== Toowoomba ===
1932 Queensland state election: Toowoomba
Party	Candidate	Votes	%	±%
Labor	Evan Llewelyn	4,456	52.4	
CPNP	James Annand	8,568	43.3	
Communist	Fred Paterson	359	4.2	
Total formal votes		8,499	99.2	
Turnout		8,568	92.8	
Labor gain from CPNP		Swing		

- Preferences were not distributed.

=== Townsville ===
1932 Queensland state election: Townsville
Party	Candidate	Votes	%	±%
Labor	Maurice Hynes	5,686	73.0	
Independent	John Burns	1,990	25.5	
Communist	Douglas Price	114	1.5	
Total formal votes		7,790	98.8	
Informal votes		92	1.2	
Turnout		7,882	92.0	
Labor hold		Swing		

- Preferences were not distributed.

=== Warrego ===
1932 Queensland state election: Warrego
Party	Candidate	Votes	%	±%
Labor	Randolph Bedford	3,171	55.3	
CPNP	John Fletcher	1,870	32.6	
Independent Labor	John Kerr	689	12.0	
Total formal votes		5,730	98.9	
Informal votes		63	1.1	
Turnout		5,793	85.6	
Labor hold		Swing		

- Preferences were not distributed.

=== Warwick ===
1932 Queensland state election: Warwick
Party	Candidate	Votes	%	±%
CPNP	George Barnes	3,865	51.7	
Labor	John Healy	3,399	45.5	
Queensland Party	Alice Chambers	209	2.8	
Total formal votes		7,473	99.4	
Informal votes		43	0.6	
Turnout		7,516	96.1	
CPNP hold		Swing		

- Preferences were not distributed.

=== West Moreton ===
1932 Queensland state election: West Moreton
Party	Candidate	Votes	%	±%
CPNP	Ted Maher	3,723	52.0	
Labor	Lorenz Krebs	2,349	32.8	
Queensland Party	Christy Littman	684	9.6	
Independent	William Cooper	400	5.6	
Total formal votes		7,156	99.2	
Informal votes		56	0.8	
Turnout		7,212	95.5	
CPNP hold		Swing		

- Preferences were not distributed.

=== Wide Bay ===
1932 Queensland state election: Wide Bay
Party	Candidate	Votes	%	±%
CPNP	Harry Clayton	4,214	62.4	
Labor	John Brown	2,535	37.6	
Total formal votes		6,749	97.4	
Informal votes		180	2.6	
Turnout		6,929	93.7	
CPNP hold		Swing		

=== Windsor ===
1932 Queensland state election: Windsor
Party	Candidate	Votes	%	±%
CPNP	Charles Taylor	4,291	46.7	
Labor	Ernest Manchester	3,395	37.0	
Independent Labor	Donald MacKenzie	951	10.4	
Independent	Francis Corbett	541	5.9	
Total formal votes		9,178	99.1	
Informal votes		83	0.9	
Turnout		9,261	88.6	
Two-party-preferred result
CPNP	Charles Taylor	4,522	54.0	
Labor	Ernest Manchester	3,852	46.0	
CPNP hold		Swing		

=== Wynnum ===
1932 Queensland state election: Wynnum
Party	Candidate	Votes	%	±%
CPNP	Walter Barnes	4,224	49.5	
Labor	John Donnelly	3,658	42.9	
Queensland Party	William Argaet	651	7.6	
Total formal votes		8,533	99.3	
Informal votes		60	0.7	
Turnout		8,593	93.1	
Two-party-preferred result
CPNP	Walter Barnes	4,684	53.8	
Labor	John Donnelly	3,761	46.2	
CPNP hold		Swing		

==== By-election ====
- This by-election was caused by the death of Walter Barnes. It was held on 29 April 1933.

1933 Wynnum state by-election
Party	Candidate	Votes	%	±%
CPNP	James Bayley	4,170	46.3	−3.2
Labor	John Donnelly	4,096	45.5	+2.6
Queensland Party	William Argaet	505	6.3	−1.3
Communist	Bert Hurworth	167	1.9	+1.9
Total formal votes		8,998	98.9	−0.4
Informal votes		101	1.1	+0.4
Turnout		9,099		
Two-party-preferred result
CPNP	James Bayley	4,385	50.9	−2.9
Labor	John Donnelly	4,236	49.1	+2.9
CPNP hold		Swing	−2.9	

== See also ==
- 1932 Queensland state election
- Candidates of the Queensland state election, 1932
- Members of the Queensland Legislative Assembly, 1932-1935
