= Results of the 1929 Queensland state election =

Queensland state election, 11 May 1929 Legislative Assembly << 1926–1932 >>
Enrolled voters	491,589^{[1]}				
Votes cast	438,248		Turnout	89.15%	+0.42
Informal votes	6,836		Informal	1.56%	+0.33
Summary of votes by party
Party	Primary votes	%	Swing	Seats	Change
CPNP	233,977	54.23%	+5.03	43	+15
Labor	173,242	40.16%	–7.80	27	–16
Communist	2,890	0.67%	+0.67	0	± 0
Independent	21,303	4.94%	+3.33	2	+ 1
Total	431,412			72	

This is a list of electoral district results for the 1929 Queensland state election.

At the time, the voting system in Queensland was based on contingency voting, which was similar to the modern optional preferential voting system. In electorates with 3 or more candidates, preferences were not distributed if a candidate received more than 50% of the primary vote.

If none received more than 50%, all except the top two candidates were eliminated from the count and their preferences distributed between the two leaders, with the one receiving the most votes declared the winner.

== Results by electoral district ==
=== Albert ===
1929 Queensland state election: Albert
Party	Candidate	Votes	%	±%
CPNP	Tom Plunkett	5,446	73.0	+4.2
Labor	Edward Moran	2,011	27.0	−3.1
Total formal votes		7,458	98.7	+0.1
Informal votes		99	1.3	−0.1
Turnout		7,557	89.7	+0.7
CPNP hold		Swing	N/A	

=== Aubigny ===
1929 Queensland state election: Aubigny
Party	Candidate	Votes	%	±%
CPNP	Arthur Moore	3,914	65.1	−4.4
Independent	Edward Gore	2,099	34.9	+34.9
Total formal votes		6,013	98.8	−0.4
Informal votes		75	1.2	+0.4
Turnout		6,088	94.8	+2.1
CPNP hold		Swing	N/A	

=== Balonne ===
1929 Queensland state election: Balonne
Party	Candidate	Votes	%	±%
Labor	Samuel Brassington	2,980	63.9	+7.0
CPNP	James Hindmarsh	1,682	36.1	−7.0
Total formal votes		4,662	98.2	−1.2
Informal votes		85	1.8	+1.2
Turnout		4,747	79.1	+0.6
Labor hold		Swing	+7.0	

=== Barcoo ===
1929 Queensland state election: Barcoo
Party	Candidate	Votes	%	±%
Labor	Frank Bulcock	unopposed		
Labor hold		Swing		

=== Bowen ===
1929 Queensland state election: Bowen
Party	Candidate	Votes	%	±%
Labor	Charles Collins	3,105	51.6	−6.0
CPNP	Thomas Mann	2,916	48.4	+6.0
Total formal votes		6,021	98.1	−0.8
Informal votes		118	1.9	+0.8
Turnout		6,139	90.5	+0.7
Labor hold		Swing	−6.0	

=== Bremer ===
1929 Queensland state election: Bremer
Party	Candidate	Votes	%	±%
Labor	Frank Cooper	3,080	51.2	−15.0
CPNP	Thomas Mitchell	2,933	48.8	+15.0
Total formal votes		6,082	98.9	0.0
Informal votes		69	1.1	0.0
Turnout		6,082	92.5	−1.9
Labor hold		Swing	−15.0	

=== Brisbane ===
1929 Queensland state election: Brisbane
Party	Candidate	Votes	%	±%
Labor	Mick Kirwan	2,128	47.1	−12.7
CPNP	Thomas Thatcher	2,080	46.0	+5.8
Communist	Jack Miles	219	4.9	+4.9
Independent	Fred O'Keefe	91	2.0	+2.0
Total formal votes		4,508	97.2	−1.2
Informal votes		138	2.8	+1.2
Turnout		4,646	81.5	+3.0
Two-party-preferred result
Labor	Mick Kirwan	2,154	50.3	−9.5
CPNP	Thomas Thatcher	2,126	49.7	+9.5
Labor hold		Swing	−9.5	

=== Bulimba ===
1929 Queensland state election: Bulimba
Party	Candidate	Votes	%	±%
CPNP	Irene Longman	5,762	51.8	+11.9
Labor	Harry Wright	5,361	48.2	−7.4
Total formal votes		11,123	98.8	0.0
Informal votes		134	1.2	0.0
Turnout		11,257	92.9	−0.8
CPNP gain from Labor		Swing	N/A	

=== Bundaberg ===
1929 Queensland state election: Bundaberg
Party	Candidate	Votes	%	±%
Labor	George Barber	3,816	51.1	−8.3
CPNP	Andrew Christiansen	3,651	48.9	+8.3
Total formal votes		7,467	98.7	−0.2
Informal votes		96	1.3	+0.2
Turnout		7,563	93.5	+1.5
Labor hold		Swing	−8.3	

=== Buranda ===
1929 Queensland state election: Buranda
Party	Candidate	Votes	%	±%
Labor	Ted Hanson	3,425	51.3	−9.0
CPNP	Henry Quinn	3,252	48.7	+9.0
Total formal votes		6,677	98.5	−0.7
Informal votes		102	1.5	+0.7
Turnout		6,779	83.3	−9.0
Labor hold		Swing	−9.0	

=== Burke ===
1929 Queensland state election: Burke
Party	Candidate	Votes	%	±%
Labor	Darby Riordan	2,205	65.8	−34.2
CPNP	Robert Clarke	1,148	34.2	+34.2
Total formal votes		3,353	97.5	
Informal votes		86	2.5	
Turnout		3,439	70.4	
Labor hold		Swing	N/A	

==== By-election ====
- This by-election was caused by the resignation of Darby Riordan, who entered Federal politics. It was held on 2 November 1929.

1929 Burke state by-election
Party	Candidate	Votes	%	±%
Labor	Arthur Jones	1,524	63.5	−2.3
CPNP	Robert Clarke	878	36.5	+2.3
Total formal votes		2,402	99.3	+1.8
Informal votes		17	0.7	−1.8
Turnout		2,419	49.8	−20.6
Labor hold		Swing	−2.3	

=== Burnett ===
1929 Queensland state election: Burnett
Party	Candidate	Votes	%	±%
CPNP	Robert Boyd	4,281	60.0	−2.2
Labor	Robert Martin	2,855	40.0	+2.2
Total formal votes		7,136	98.4	+0.1
Informal votes		116	1.6	−0.1
Turnout		7,252	91.7	+0.7
CPNP hold		Swing	−2.2	

=== Burrum ===
1929 Queensland state election: Burrum
Party	Candidate	Votes	%	±%
CPNP	William Brand	3,754	60.2	+5.2
Labor	Timothy Hanley	2,479	39.8	−5.2
Total formal votes		6,233	99.4	+0.5
Informal votes		38	0.6	−0.5
Turnout		6,271	92.3	+2.4
CPNP hold		Swing	+5.2	

=== Cairns ===
1929 Queensland state election: Cairns
Party	Candidate	Votes	%	±%
Labor	William McCormack	4,182	56.6	−9.8
CPNP	Ronald Muir	3,210	43.4	+9.8
Total formal votes		7,392	99.1	0.0
Informal votes		67	0.9	0.0
Turnout		7,459	89.8	+1.3
Labor hold		Swing	−9.8	

==== By-election ====
- This by-election was caused by the resignation of William McCormack. It was held on 10 May 1930.

1930 Cairns state by-election
Party	Candidate	Votes	%	±%
Labor	John O'Keefe	4,399	62.4	+5.8
CPNP	Charles Hives	2,648	37.6	−5.8
Total formal votes		7,047	99.5	+0.4
Informal votes		35	0.5	−0.4
Turnout		7,082	77.9	−11.9
Labor hold		Swing	+5.8	

=== Carnarvon ===
1929 Queensland state election: Carnarvon
Party	Candidate	Votes	%	±%
CPNP	Edward Costello	3,693	60.7	+6.8
Labor	Adolphus Baker	2,390	39.3	−6.8
Total formal votes		6,083	99.0	−0.1
Informal votes		59	1.0	+0.1
Turnout		6,142	89.3	+1.3
CPNP hold		Swing	+6.8	

=== Charters Towers ===
1929 Queensland state election: Charters Towers
Party	Candidate	Votes	%	±%
Labor	William Wellington	1,976	54.0	−8.3
CPNP	Herbert Poole	1,682	46.0	+8.3
Total formal votes		3,658	98.9	+0.1
Informal votes		40	1.1	−0.1
Turnout		3,698	85.6	−3.0
Labor hold		Swing	−8.3	

=== Chillagoe ===
1929 Queensland state election: Chillagoe
Party	Candidate	Votes	%	±%
CPNP	Ernest Atherton	1,844	52.9	+20.4
Labor	John O'Keefe	1,639	47.1	−20.4
Total formal votes		3,483	98.4	−0.4
Informal votes		56	1.6	+0.4
Turnout		3,539	77.3	+1.8
CPNP gain from Labor		Swing	+20.4	

=== Cook ===
1929 Queensland state election: Cook
Party	Candidate	Votes	%	±%
CPNP	James Kenny	2,046	52.8	+14.8
Labor	Harry Ryan	1,830	47.2	−14.8
Total formal votes		3,876	99.1	+0.6
Informal votes		35	0.9	−0.6
Turnout		3,911	85.3	−0.9
CPNP gain from Labor		Swing	+14.8	

=== Cooroora ===
1929 Queensland state election: Cooroora
Party	Candidate	Votes	%	±%
CPNP	Harry Walker	unopposed		
CPNP hold		Swing		

=== Cunningham ===
1929 Queensland state election: Cunningham
Party	Candidate	Votes	%	±%
CPNP	William Deacon	4,514	77.9	+8.8
Independent	Percy Bayley	1,282	22.1	+22.1
Total formal votes		5,796	99.0	−0.4
Informal votes		57	1.0	+0.4
Turnout		5,853	87.1	+1.9
CPNP hold		Swing	N/A	

=== Dalby ===
1929 Queensland state election: Dalby
Party	Candidate	Votes	%	±%
CPNP	Wilfred Russell	3,511	65.9	+38.3
Labor	Clive Curtis	1,816	34.1	+3.0
Total formal votes		5,327		
Informal votes				
Turnout				
CPNP gain from Independent		Swing	N/A	

=== Eacham ===
1929 Queensland state election: Eacham
Party	Candidate	Votes	%	±%
CPNP	George Duffy	3,145	60.2	+11.7
Labor	Cornelius Ryan	2,075	39.8	−11.7
Total formal votes		5,220		
Informal votes				
Turnout				
CPNP gain from Labor		Swing	+11.7	

=== East Toowoomba ===
1929 Queensland state election: East Toowoomba
Party	Candidate	Votes	%	±%
CPNP	Robert Roberts	4,136	69.7	+7.9
Labor	Reginald Turnbull	1,793	30.3	−7.9
Total formal votes		5,929		
Informal votes				
Turnout				
CPNP hold		Swing	+7.9	

=== Enoggera ===
1929 Queensland state election: Enoggera
Party	Candidate	Votes	%	±%
CPNP	Jim Kerr	7,594	66.8	+5.5
Labor	George Cooper	3,774	33.2	−5.5
Total formal votes		11,368	98.8	−0.4
Informal votes		136	1.2	+0.4
Turnout		11,504		
Labor hold		Swing	+5.5	

=== Fassifern ===
1929 Queensland state election: Fassifern
Party	Candidate	Votes	%	±%
CPNP	Ernest Bell	unopposed		
CPNP hold		Swing		

==== By-election ====
- This by-election was caused by the death of Ernest Bell. It was held on 28 June 1930.

1930 Fassifern state by-election
Party	Candidate	Votes	%	±%
Independent	Arnold Wienholt	3,555	59.5	+59.5
CPNP	Joseph Hopkins	1,738	29.1	−70.9
Independent	Joseph Sweeney	679	11.4	+11.4
Total formal votes		5,972		
Informal votes				
Turnout				
Independent gain from CPNP		Swing	N/A	

=== Fitzroy ===
1929 Queensland state election: Fitzroy
Party	Candidate	Votes	%	±%
CPNP	William Carter	4,073	59.8	+18.2
Labor	Harry Hartley	2,737	40.2	−18.2
Total formal votes		6,810	98.7	+0.3
Informal votes		89	1.3	−0.3
Turnout		6,899		
CPNP gain from Labor		Swing	+18.2	

=== Flinders ===
1929 Queensland state election: Flinders
Party	Candidate	Votes	%	±%
Labor	John Mullan	1,693	66.2	+0.3
CPNP	James Scholefield	863	33.8	−0.3
Total formal votes		2,556	98.7	−0.6
Informal votes		34	1.3	+0.6
Turnout		2,590		
Labor hold		Swing	+0.3	

=== Fortitude Valley ===
1929 Queensland state election: Fortitude Valley
Party	Candidate	Votes	%	±%
Labor	Thomas Wilson	3,356	53.7	−9.1
CPNP	John McLennan	2,587	41.4	+4.2
Independent	John Durkin	304	4.9	+4.9
Total formal votes		6,247	98.5	−0.7
Informal votes		96	1.5	+0.7
Turnout		6,343		
Labor hold		Swing	N/A	

=== Gregory ===
1929 Queensland state election: Gregory
Party	Candidate	Votes	%	±%
Labor	George Pollock	unopposed		
Labor hold		Swing		

=== Gympie ===
1929 Queensland state election: Gympie
Party	Candidate	Votes	%	±%
CPNP	Vivian Tozer	2,548	54.5	+11.5
Labor	Thomas Dunstan	2,125	45.5	−11.5
Total formal votes		4,673		
Informal votes				
Turnout				
CPNP gain from Labor		Swing	+11.5	

=== Herbert ===
1929 Queensland state election: Herbert
Party	Candidate	Votes	%	±%
Labor	Percy Pease	4,370	57.5	+0.2
CPNP	Clarence Page	3,226	42.5	−0.2
Total formal votes		7,596	97.4	−1.6
Informal votes		205	2.6	+1.6
Turnout		7,801		
Labor hold		Swing	+0.2	

=== Ipswich ===
1929 Queensland state election: Ipswich
Party	Candidate	Votes	%	±%
CPNP	James Walker	3,968	56.9	+13.1
Labor	David Gledson	3,010	43.1	−13.1
Total formal votes		6,978	98.5	−0.3
Informal votes		104	1.5	+0.3
Turnout		7,082		
CPNP gain from Labor		Swing	+13.1	

=== Ithaca ===
1929 Queensland state election: Ithaca
Party	Candidate	Votes	%	±%
Labor	Ned Hanlon	3,926	51.8	−7.0
CPNP	John Shaw	3,646	48.2	+9.8
Total formal votes		7,572	99.2	+0.4
Informal votes		63	0.8	−0.4
Turnout		7,635		
Labor hold		Swing	N/A	

=== Kelvin Grove ===
1929 Queensland state election: Kelvin Grove
Party	Candidate	Votes	%	±%
CPNP	Richard Hill	4,421	54.4	+8.7
Labor	William Lloyd	3,708	45.6	−8.7
Total formal votes		8,129	98.7	−0.5
Informal votes		105	1.3	+0.5
Turnout		8,234		
CPNP gain from Labor		Swing	+8.7	

=== Kennedy ===
1929 Queensland state election: Kennedy
Party	Candidate	Votes	%	±%
Labor	Harry Bruce	3,405	55.4	+5.2
CPNP	Henry Hollins	2,738	44.6	+1.3
Total formal votes		6,143		
Informal votes				
Turnout				
Labor hold		Swing	N/A	

=== Keppel ===
1929 Queensland state election: Keppel
Party	Candidate	Votes	%	±%
CPNP	Owen Daniel	3,347	57.0	+15.2
Labor	James Larcombe	2,527	43.0	−15.2
Total formal votes		5,874	98.6	−0.3
Informal votes		83	1.4	+0.3
Turnout		5,957		
CPNP gain from Labor		Swing	+15.2	

=== Kurilpa ===
1929 Queensland state election: Kurilpa
Party	Candidate	Votes	%	±%
CPNP	James Fry	3,575	53.0	−2.3
Labor	Kerry Copley	3,168	47.0	+2.3
Total formal votes		6,743	99.2	+0.1
Informal votes		56	0.8	−0.1
Turnout		6,799		
CPNP hold		Swing	−2.3	

=== Leichhardt ===
1929 Queensland state election: Leichhardt
Party	Candidate	Votes	%	±%
Labor	Tom Foley	1,861	56.0	−5.4
CPNP	George Tuck	1,462	44.0	+5.4
Total formal votes		3,323		
Informal votes				
Turnout				
Labor hold		Swing	−5.4	

=== Lockyer ===
1929 Queensland state election: Lockyer
Party	Candidate	Votes	%	±%
Independent	Charles Jamieson	3,077	54.5	+54.5
CPNP	George Logan	2,573	45.5	+1.6
Total formal votes		5,650	99.3	−0.1
Informal votes		42	0.7	+0.1
Turnout		5,692		
Independent gain from CPNP		Swing	N/A	

=== Logan ===
1929 Queensland state election: Logan
Party	Candidate	Votes	%	±%
CPNP	Reginald King	7,418	64.8	+11.2
Labor	Richard Leggat	4,029	35.2	−11.2
Total formal votes		11,447	98.9	−0.3
Informal votes		129	1.1	+0.3
Turnout		11,576		
CPNP hold		Swing	+11.2	

=== Mackay ===
1929 Queensland state election: Mackay
Party	Candidate	Votes	%	±%
Labor	William Forgan Smith	3,686	57.9	−6.7
CPNP	George Milton	2,679	42.1	+6.7
Total formal votes		6,365	99.0	0.0
Informal votes		62	1.0	0.0
Turnout		6,427	85.5	+3.4
Labor hold		Swing	−6.7	

=== Maranoa ===
1929 Queensland state election: Maranoa
Party	Candidate	Votes	%	±%
Labor	Charles Conroy	2,728	52.4	−2.4
CPNP	Arthur Miscamble	2,475	47.6	+2.4
Total formal votes		5,203	99.4	+2.7
Informal votes		30	0.6	−2.7
Turnout		5,233	89.1	−0.5
Labor hold		Swing	−2.4	

=== Maree ===
1929 Queensland state election: Maree
Party	Candidate	Votes	%	±%
CPNP	George Tedman	4,034	57.0	+7.5
Labor	William Bertram	3,042	43.0	−7.5
Total formal votes		7,076	98.6	−0.4
Informal votes		97	1.4	+0.4
Turnout		7,173	91.3	−0.6
CPNP gain from Labor		Swing	+7.5	

=== Maryborough ===
1929 Queensland state election: Maryborough
Party	Candidate	Votes	%	±%
Labor	David Weir	3,179	52.0	−7.3
CPNP	John Blackley	2,930	48.0	+7.3
Total formal votes		6,109	98.2	−0.8
Informal votes		110	1.8	+0.8
Turnout		6,219	94.0	+0.4
Labor hold		Swing	−7.3	

==== By-elections ====
- This by-election was caused by the death of David Weir, and was held on 26 October 1929.

1929 Maryborough state by-election
Party	Candidate	Votes	%	±%
CPNP	John Blackley	2,988	51.4	+3.4
Labor	Kerry Copley	2,826	48.6	−3.4
Total formal votes		5,814	99.7	+1.5
Informal votes		15	0.3	−1.5
Turnout		5,829		
CPNP gain from Labor		Swing	+3.4	

=== Merthyr ===
1929 Queensland state election: Merthyr
Party	Candidate	Votes	%	±%
CPNP	Patrick Kerwin	4,204	57.0	+8.5
Labor	Peter McLachlan	3,177	43.0	−8.5
Total formal votes		7,381	99.0	−0.2
Informal votes		73	1.0	+0.2
Turnout		7,454	80.2	+1.2
CPNP gain from Labor		Swing	+8.5	

=== Mirani ===
1929 Queensland state election: Mirani
Party	Candidate	Votes	%	±%
CPNP	Edward Swayne	3,698	58.5	+6.3
Labor	John Mulherin	2,628	41.5	−6.3
Total formal votes		6,326	98.7	−0.3
Informal votes		82	1.3	+0.3
Turnout		6,408	85.7	+4.4
CPNP hold		Swing	+6.3	

=== Mitchell ===
1929 Queensland state election: Mitchell
Party	Candidate	Votes	%	±%
Labor	Richard Bow	2,384	58.4	−41.6
CPNP	Francis McKeon	1,697	41.6	+41.6
Total formal votes		4,081	99.0	
Informal votes		38	1.0	
Turnout		4,119	77.1	
Labor hold		Swing	N/A	

=== Mount Morgan ===
1929 Queensland state election: Mount Morgan
Party	Candidate	Votes	%	±%
Labor	James Stopford	1,548	52.3	−14.0
CPNP	Sydney Paterson	1,410	47.7	+14.0
Total formal votes		2,958	97.3	−1.4
Informal votes		83	2.7	+1.4
Turnout		3,041	90.2	+4.0
Labor hold		Swing	−14.0	

=== Mundingburra ===
1929 Queensland state election: Mundingburra
Party	Candidate	Votes	%	±%
Labor	John Dash	4,995	81.5	+7.5
Communist	Ted Tripp	1,137	18.5	+18.5
Total formal votes		6,132	92.6	−6.5
Informal votes		492	7.4	+6.5
Turnout		6,624	93.7	+2.4
Labor hold		Swing	N/A	

=== Murilla ===
1929 Queensland state election: Murilla
Party	Candidate	Votes	%	±%
CPNP	Godfrey Morgan	2,837	57.1	+4.3
Labor	Robert Munro	2,131	42.9	+0.9
Total formal votes		4,968	99.0	+0.4
Informal votes		51	1.0	−0.4
Turnout		5,019	87.8	−0.4
CPNP hold		Swing	N/A	

=== Murrumba ===
1929 Queensland state election: Murrumba
Party	Candidate	Votes	%	±%
CPNP	Richard Warren	3,473	54.0	−14.9
Independent	Ernest Coghlan	2,458	38.2	+38.2
Independent	Alfred O'Loan	504	7.8	+4.9
Total formal votes		6,435	97.7	−0.1
Informal votes		154	2.3	+0.1
CPNP hold		Swing	N/A	

=== Nanango ===
1929 Queensland state election: Nanango
Party	Candidate	Votes	%	±%
CPNP	Jim Edwards	3,930	59.2	−1.1
Independent	Wilfred Osborne	2,712	40.8	+40.8
Total formal votes		6,642	98.3	+1.0
Informal votes		113	1.7	−1.0
Turnout		6,755	87.2	−3.3
CPNP hold		Swing	N/A	

=== Normanby ===
1929 Queensland state election: Normanby
Party	Candidate	Votes	%	±%
CPNP	Jens Peterson	2,621	62.6	+5.9
Labor	Thomas Ritchie	1,563	37.4	−5.9
Total formal votes		4,184	99.0	+0.1
Informal votes		42	1.0	−0.1
Turnout		4,226	90.3	+1.2
CPNP hold		Swing	+5.9	

=== Nundah ===
1929 Queensland state election: Nundah
Party	Candidate	Votes	%	±%
CPNP	William Kelso	6,754	67.1	+7.9
Labor	Thomas Darby	3,315	32.9	−7.9
Total formal votes		10,069	99.1	0.0
Informal votes		88	0.9	0.0
Turnout		10,157	93.4	+0.7
CPNP hold		Swing	+7.9	

=== Oxley ===
1929 Queensland state election: Oxley
Party	Candidate	Votes	%	±%
CPNP	Thomas Nimmo	4,616	43.5	−16.9
Labor	James MacArthur	3,196	30.1	−9.5
Independent	Cecil Elphinstone	2,790	26.3	+26.3
Total formal votes		10,602	98.2	−1.0
Informal votes		194	1.8	+1.0
Turnout		10,796	93.5	+1.2
Two-party-preferred result
CPNP	Thomas Nimmo	6,347	64.2	+3.8
Labor	James MacArthur	3,538	35.8	−3.8
CPNP hold		Swing	+3.8	

=== Paddington ===
1929 Queensland state election: Paddington
Party	Candidate	Votes	%	±%
Labor	Alfred Jones	3,581	71.6	−1.5
Communist	Fred Paterson	1,418	28.4	+28.4
Total formal votes		4,999	90.3	−5.9
Informal votes		539	9.7	+5.9
Turnout		5,538	75.4	−2.0
Labor hold		Swing	N/A	

=== Port Curtis ===
1929 Queensland state election: Port Curtis
Party	Candidate	Votes	%	±%
CPNP	Frank Butler	3,550	55.6	+12.1
Labor	George Carter	2,829	44.4	−1.2
Total formal votes		6,379	99.1	+0.2
Informal votes		58	0.9	−0.2
Turnout		6,437	94.3	+3.4
CPNP gain from Labor		Swing	+7.1	

=== Queenton ===
1929 Queensland state election: Queenton
Party	Candidate	Votes	%	±%
Labor	Vern Winstanley	1,893	51.1	−4.8
CPNP	Walter Bennett	1,812	48.9	+4.8
Total formal votes		3,696	98.5	−0.6
Informal votes		65	1.5	+0.6
Turnout		3,761	89.1	+2.9
Labor hold		Swing	−4.8	

=== Rockhampton ===
1929 Queensland state election: Rockhampton
Party	Candidate	Votes	%	±%
Independent	Thomas Dunlop	2,993	61.7	+61.7
Labor	George Farrell	1,855	38.3	−29.4
Total formal votes		4,848	98.7	+0.9
Informal votes		62	1.3	−0.9
Turnout		4,910	92.0	+4.0
Independent gain from Labor		Swing	N/A	

=== Rosewood ===
1929 Queensland state election: Rosewood
Party	Candidate	Votes	%	±%
CPNP	Ted Maher	3,459	56.6	+14.2
Labor	William Cooper	2,656	43.4	−14.2
Total formal votes		6,115	99.0	+0.8
Informal votes		64	1.0	−0.8
Turnout		6,179	89.0	−5.1
CPNP gain from Labor		Swing	+14.2	

=== Sandgate ===
1929 Queensland state election: Sandgate
Party	Candidate	Votes	%	±%
CPNP	Hubert Sizer	4,796	55.4	−4.4
Labor	Jack Kavanagh	2,811	32.5	−7.7
Independent	William Childs	1,050	12.1	+12.1
Total formal votes		8,657	98.0	−1.0
Informal votes		175	2.0	+1.0
Turnout		8,832	93.9	+3.4
CPNP hold		Swing	N/A	

=== South Brisbane ===
1929 Queensland state election: South Brisbane
Party	Candidate	Votes	%	±%
CPNP	Neil MacGroarty	3,183	55.0	+5.8
Labor	Myles Ferricks	2,606	45.0	−5.8
Total formal votes		5,789	98.2	−0.9
Informal votes		105	1.8	+0.9
Turnout		5,894	86.9	−0.5
CPNP gain from Labor		Swing	+5.8	

=== Stanley ===
1929 Queensland state election: Stanley
Party	Candidate	Votes	%	±%
CPNP	Ernest Grimstone	4,625	74.7	+11.7
Independent	Andrew Fredin	1,567	25.3	+25.3
Total formal votes		6,192	98.6	−0.4
Informal votes		62	1.0	+0.4
Turnout		6,281	93.2	+3.0
CPNP hold		Swing	N/A	

=== Toombul ===
1929 Queensland state election: Toombul
Party	Candidate	Votes	%	±%
CPNP	Hugh Russell	5,675	73.5	+20.9
Labor	James Lough	2,042	26.5	+26.5
Total formal votes		7,717	99.1	+2.4
Informal votes		67	0.9	−2.4
Turnout		7,784	90.2	+0.4
CPNP hold		Swing	N/A	

=== Toowong ===
1929 Queensland state election: Toowong
Party	Candidate	Votes	%	±%
CPNP	James Maxwell	6,336	73.8	+5.8
Labor	Leslie Day	2,255	26.3	−5.8
Total formal votes		8,591	99.1	−0.3
Informal votes		74	0.9	+0.3
Turnout		8,665	91.4	+0.9
CPNP hold		Swing	+5.8	

=== Toowoomba ===
1929 Queensland state election: Toowoomba
Party	Candidate	Votes	%	±%
CPNP	James Annand	3,801	51.3	+8.0
Labor	Evan Llewelyn	3,601	48.7	−8.0
Total formal votes		7,402	98.0	−0.5
Informal votes		151	2.0	+0.5
Turnout		7,553	90.0	+2.1
CPNP gain from Labor		Swing	+8.0	

=== Townsville ===
1929 Queensland state election: Townsville
Party	Candidate	Votes	%	±%
Labor	Maurice Hynes	2,437	54.5	−9.7
CPNP	Ernest Garbutt	1,890	42.3	+6.5
Communist	Desmond Morris	116	2.6	+2.6
Independent	William Jackson	25	0.6	+0.6
Total formal votes		4,468	96.9	−1.6
Informal votes		144	3.1	+1.6
Turnout		4,612	88.4	+1.5
Labor hold		Swing	N/A	

=== Warrego ===
1929 Queensland state election: Warrego
Party	Candidate	Votes	%	±%
Labor	Randolph Bedford	2,291	57.7	−42.3
CPNP	Oswald Allen	1,681	42.3	+42.3
Total formal votes		3,972	98.0	
Informal votes		79	2.0	
Turnout		4,051	75.4	
Labor hold		Swing	N/A	

=== Warwick ===
1929 Queensland state election: Warwick
Party	Candidate	Votes	%	±%
CPNP	George Barnes	3,598	56.0	+1.4
Labor	Patrick McMahon	2,827	44.0	−1.4
Total formal votes		6,425	99.1	0.0
Informal votes		59	0.9	0.0
Turnout		6,484	92.2	+2.6
CPNP hold		Swing	+1.4	

=== Wide Bay ===
1929 Queensland state election: Wide Bay
Party	Candidate	Votes	%	±%
CPNP	Harry Clayton	4,808	74.6	+0.9
Independent	Aaron Davies	1,633	25.4	+25.4
Total formal votes		6,441	98.3	+0.8
Informal votes		113	1.7	−0.8
Turnout		6,554	91.2	+0.4
CPNP hold		Swing	N/A	

=== Windsor ===
1929 Queensland state election: Windsor
Party	Candidate	Votes	%	±%
CPNP	Charles Taylor	5,312	63.5	+5.2
Labor	Harry Nowotny	3,049	36.5	−5.2
Total formal votes		8,361	99.1	+0.2
Informal votes		74	0.9	−0.2
Turnout		8,435	92.6	+0.8
CPNP hold		Swing	+5.2	

=== Wynnum ===
1929 Queensland state election: Wynnum
Party	Candidate	Votes	%	±%
CPNP	Walter Barnes	5,368	68.3	+6.7
Labor	Fred Moore	2,492	31.7	−6.7
Total formal votes		7,860	99.1	−0.2
Informal votes		73	0.9	+0.2
Turnout		7,933	91.8	+0.8
CPNP hold		Swing	+6.7	

== See also ==
- 1929 Queensland state election
- Candidates of the Queensland state election, 1929
- Members of the Queensland Legislative Assembly, 1929-1932
