= Candidates of the 1929 Queensland state election =

The 1929 state election in Queensland, Australia was held on 11 May 1929.

== By-elections ==
- On 6 August 1927, Samuel Brassington (Labor) was elected to succeed Edward Land (Labor), who had died on 2 May 1927, as the member for Balonne.
- On 25 February 1928, Ernest Grimstone (CPNP) was elected to succeed Frederick Nott (CPNP), who had died on 5 December 1927, as the member for Stanley.
- On 26 May 1928, Richard Bow (Labor) was elected to succeed John Payne (Labor), who had died on 24 January 1928, as the member for Mitchell.
- On 13 October 1928, Robert Boyd (CPNP) was elected to succeed Bernard Corser (CPNP), who had resigned on 16 August 1928, as the member for Burnett.

== Retiring Members ==
CPNP Albert MLA John Appel died prior to the election; no by-election was held.

No members retired at this election.

== Candidates ==
Sitting members at the time of the election are shown in bold text.

Electorate	Held by	Labor candidate	CPNP candidate	Other candidates
Albert	CPNP	Edward Moran	Tom Plunkett	
Aubigny	CPNP		**Arthur Moore**	Edward Gore (Ind)
Balonne	Labor	**Samuel Brassington**	James Hindmarsh	
Barcoo	Labor	**Frank Bulcock**		
Bowen	Labor	**Charles Collins**	Thomas Mann	
Bremer	Labor	**Frank Cooper**	Thomas Mitchell	
Brisbane	Labor	**Mick Kirwan**	Thomas Thatcher	Jack Miles (CPA); Fred O'Keefe (Ind)
Bulimba	Labor	**Harry Wright**	Irene Longman	
Bundaberg	Labor	**George Barber**	Andrew Christiansen	
Buranda	Labor	**Ted Hanson**	Henry Quinn	
Burke	Labor	**Darby Riordan**	Robert Clarke	
Burnett	CPNP	Robert Martin	**Robert Boyd**	
Burrum	CPNP	Timothy Hanley	**William Brand**	
Cairns	Labor	**William McCormack**	Ronald Muir	
Carnarvon	CPNP	Adolphus Baker	**Edward Costello**	
Charters Towers	Labor	**William Wellington**	Herbert Poole	
Chillagoe	Labor	**John O'Keefe**	Ernest Atherton	
Cook	Labor	**Henry Ryan**	James Kenny	
Cooroora	CPNP		**Harry Walker**	
Cunningham	CPNP		**William Deacon**	Percy Bayley (Ind)
Dalby	CPNP	Clive Curtis	**Wilfred Russell**	
Eacham	Labor	**Cornelius Ryan**	George Duffy	
East Toowoomba	CPNP	Reginald Turnbull	**Robert Roberts**	
Enoggera	CPNP	George Cooper	**Jim Kerr**	
Fassifern	CPNP		**Ernest Bell**	
Fitzroy	Labor	**Harry Hartley**	William Carter	
Flinders	Labor	**John Mullan**	James Scholefield	
Fortitude Valley	Labor	**Thomas Wilson**	John McLennan	John Durkin (Ind)
Gregory	Labor	**George Pollock**		
Gympie	Labor	**Thomas Dunstan**	Vivian Tozer	
Herbert	Labor	**Percy Pease**	Clarence Page	
Ipswich	Labor	**David Gledson**	James Walker	
Ithaca	Labor	**Ned Hanlon**	John Shaw	
Kelvin Grove	Labor	**William Lloyd**	Richard Hill	
Kennedy	Labor	**Harry Bruce**	Henry Hollins	
Keppel	Labor	**James Larcombe**	Owen Daniel	
Kurilpa	CPNP	Kerry Copley	**James Fry**	
Leichhardt	Labor	**Tom Foley**	George Tuck	
Lockyer	CPNP		**George Logan**	Charles Jamieson (Ind)
Logan	CPNP	Richard Leggat	**Reginald King**	
Mackay	Labor	**William Forgan Smith**	George Milton	
Maranoa	Labor	**Charles Conroy**	Arthur Miscamble	
Maree	Labor	**William Bertram**	George Tedman	
Maryborough	Labor	**David Weir**	John Blackley	
Merthyr	Labor	**Peter McLachlan**	Patrick Kerwin	
Mirani	CPNP	John Mulherin	**Edward Swayne**	
Mitchell	Labor	**Richard Bow**	Francis McKeon	
Mount Morgan	Labor	**James Stopford**	Sydney Paterson	
Mundingburra	Labor	**John Dash**		Ted Tripp (CPA)
Murilla	CPNP	Robert Munro	**Godfrey Morgan**	
Murrumba	CPNP		**Richard Warren**	Ernest Coghlan (Ind); Alfred O'Loan (Ind)
Nanango	CPNP		**Jim Edwards**	Wilfred Osborne (Ind)
Normanby	CPNP	Thomas Ritchie	**Jens Peterson**	
Nundah	CPNP	Thomas Darby	**William Kelso**	
Oxley	CPNP	James MacArthur	Thomas Nimmo	**Cecil Elphinstone** (Ind)
Paddington	Labor	**Alfred Jones**		Fred Paterson (CPA)
Port Curtis	Labor	**George Carter**	Frank Butler	
Queenton	Labor	**Vern Winstanley**	Walter Bennett	
Rockhampton	Labor	**George Farrell**		Thomas Dunlop (Ind)
Rosewood	Labor	**William Cooper**	Ted Maher	
Sandgate	CPNP	Jack Kavanagh	**Hubert Sizer**	William Childs (Ind)
South Brisbane	Labor	**Myles Ferricks**	Neil MacGroarty	
Stanley	CPNP		**Ernest Grimstone**	Andrew Fredin (Ind)
Toombul	CPNP	James Lough	**Hugh Russell**	
Toowong	CPNP	Leslie Day	**James Maxwell**	
Toowoomba	Labor	**Evan Llewelyn**	James Annand	
Townsville	Labor	**Maurice Hynes**	Ernest Garbutt	William Jackson (Ind); Desmond Morris (CPA)
Warrego	Labor	**Randolph Bedford**	Oswald Allen	
Warwick	CPNP	Patrick McMahon	**George Barnes**	
Wide Bay	CPNP		**Harry Clayton**	Aaron Davies (Ind)
Windsor	CPNP	Harry Nowotny	**Charles Taylor**	
Wynnum	CPNP	Fred Moore	**Walter Barnes**	

== See also ==
- 1929 Queensland state election
- Members of the Queensland Legislative Assembly, 1926–1929
- Members of the Queensland Legislative Assembly, 1929–1932
- List of political parties in Australia
