= Candidates of the 1935 Queensland state election =

The 1935 state election in Queensland, Australia was held on 11 May 1935.

== By-elections ==
- On 29 April 1933, James Bayley (CPNP) was elected to succeed Walter Barnes (CPNP), who had died on 19 February, as the member for Wynnum.
- On 15 July 1933, Samuel Brassington (Labor) was elected to succeed Thomas Wilson (Labor), who had died on 19 May, as the member for Fortitude Valley.
- On 9 December 1933, Roy Bell (CPNP) was elected to succeed Ernest Grimstone (CPNP), who had died on 22 October, as the member for Stanley.
- On 18 August 1934, James Annand (CPNP) was elected to succeed Robert Roberts (CPNP), who had died on 2 June, as the member for East Toowoomba.

== Retiring Members ==
=== Labor ===
- George Barber MLA (Bundaberg)

=== CPNP ===
- George Barnes MLA (Warwick)
- Jens Peterson MLA (Fitzroy)
- Hubert Sizer MLA (Sandgate)
- Jim Sparkes MLA (Dalby)
- Edward Swayne MLA (Mirani)

=== Independent ===
- Arnold Wienholt MLA (Fassifern)

== Candidates ==
Sitting members at the time of the election are shown in bold text.

Electorate	Held by	Labor candidate	CPNP candidate	Social Credit candidate	Other candidates
Albert	CPNP		**Tom Plunkett**	George Gray	
Aubigny	CPNP		**Arthur Moore**		
Barcoo	Labor	**Frank Bulcock**			
Baroona	Labor	Bill Power		Julius Streeter	
Bowen	Labor	**Charles Collins**	Arthur Bradford		George Kent (Ind); Fred Paterson (CPA)
Bremer	Labor	**Frank Cooper**			Geordie Burns (CPA)
Brisbane	Labor	**Robert Funnell**		Charles Martin	Henry Shea (Ind Lab)
Bulimba	Labor	**William Copley**	Clive Lambourne		Donald Parker (CPA)
Bundaberg	Labor	Bernard McLean	Edward Redmond	Henry Clegton	
Buranda	Labor	**Ted Hanson**	Charles Edwards	John Read	
Cairns	Labor	**John O'Keefe**		John Clayton	Alan Tucker (Ind)
Carnarvon	CPNP	Paul Hilton	**Edward Costello**	Ernest Hall	
Carpentaria	Labor	**John Mullan**			
Charters Towers	Labor	**William Wellington**			Alexander Hunter (Ind); Frederick Thornleigh (Ind)
Cook	CPNP	Harold Collins	Ernest Atherton	Richard Boorman	
Cooroora	CPNP		**Harry Walker**		Nora Solly (WPA)
Cunningham	CPNP		**William Deacon**		
Dalby	CPNP	George Wilkes	**Godfrey Morgan**		
East Toowoomba	CPNP	James Kane	**James Annand**		
Enoggera	Labor	**George Taylor**	Richard Hill		
Fassifern	Independent	James Ryan	Alf Muller		
Fitzroy	CPNP	Jim Clark	Albert Pearson		
Fortitude Valley	Labor	**Samuel Brassington**	Nicholas Lockyer		Mick Ryan (CPA)
Gregory	Labor	**George Pollock**			
Gympie	CPNP	Thomas Dunstan	**Vivian Tozer**		
Hamilton	CPNP	John Moir	**Hugh Russell**		
Herbert	Labor	**Percy Pease**			Jack Henry (CPA); Roy Sherrington (Ind)
Ipswich	Labor	**David Gledson**			
Isis	CPNP	Dudley Ryder	**William Brand**		
Ithaca	Labor	**Ned Hanlon**			
Kelvin Grove	Labor	**Frank Waters**	Benjamin White		
Kennedy	CPNP	Cecil Jesson	John Jackson		
Keppel	CPNP	Albert Pascoe	**Owen Daniel**	John Harding	
Kurilpa	Labor	**Kerry Copley**	Frederick Cross		Charles Drew (Ind)
Logan	CPNP	John Brown	**Reginald King**		
Mackay	Labor	**William Forgan Smith**	William Ferguson	Arthur Williams	
Maranoa	Labor	**Charles Conroy**		Herman Brus	
Maree	Labor	**William King**	David Miller		
Maryborough	Labor	**James Stopford**			Harold McElligott (CPA)
Merthyr	Labor	**James Keogh**	William Stevens		
Mirani	CPNP	Ted Walsh	**Arthur Fadden**	Philip Kirwan	
Mundingburra	Labor	**John Dash**	Francis Hughes		Albert Robinson (CPA)
Murrumba	CPNP		**Frank Nicklin**		Alfred Langdon (Ind)
Nanango	CPNP		**Jim Edwards**		Andrew Knox (Ind)
Normanby	Labor	**Tom Foley**		Albert Webb	
Nundah	Labor	**John Hayes**	Alfred Thompson		
Oxley	CPNP	Wilhelm Thieme	**Thomas Nimmo**		
Port Curtis	Labor	**Tommy Williams**	Robert Boyd	William Gresham	
Rockhampton	Labor	**James Larcombe**		Vivian Pugh	
Sandgate	CPNP	Roland Hislop	**James Kenny**		
South Brisbane	Labor	**Vince Gair**	Robert Paine		
Stanley	CPNP	Francis Staunton	**Roy Bell**		
The Tableland	Labor	**Harry Bruce**	Robert Clarke		Jim Slater (CPA)
Toowong	CPNP	Edward Turner	**James Maxwell**	Charles Hallick	
Toowoomba	Labor	**Evan Llewelyn**	Les Boyce	Denis Hannay	Claude Jones (CPA)
Townsville	Labor	**Maurice Hynes**	Percy Davids		
Warrego	Labor	**Randolph Bedford**			
Warwick	CPNP	John Healy	Daniel Connolly		Herbert Dight (Ind)
West Moreton	CPNP		**Ted Maher**		Charles Jamieson (Ind)
Wide Bay	CPNP		**Harry Clayton**	John Rex	
Windsor	CPNP	Herbert Williams	**Charles Taylor**		
Wynnum	CPNP	John Donnelly	**James Bayley**	Joanna Helbach	

== See also ==
- 1935 Queensland state election
- Members of the Queensland Legislative Assembly, 1932–1935
- Members of the Queensland Legislative Assembly, 1935–1938
- List of political parties in Australia
