= Members of the Queensland Legislative Assembly, 1929–1932 =

This is a list of members of the 25th Legislative Assembly of Queensland from 1929 to 1932, as elected at the 1929 state election held on 11 May 1929.

Name	Party	Electorate	Term in office
James Annand	CPNP	Toowoomba	1929–1932, 1934–1935
Hon Ernest Atherton	CPNP	Chillagoe	1929–1932
George Barber	Labor	Bundaberg	1901–1935
George Barnes	CPNP	Warwick	1908–1935
Hon Walter Barnes	CPNP	Wynnum	1901–1915, 1918–1933
Randolph Bedford	Labor	Warrego	1923–1941
Ernest Bell^{[5]}	CPNP	Fassifern	1913–1930
John Blackley^{[3]}	CPNP	Maryborough	1929–1932
Richard Bow	Labor	Mitchell	1928–1932
Robert Boyd	CPNP	Burnett	1928–1932
William Brand	CPNP	Burrum	1920–1950
Samuel Brassington	Labor	Balonne	1927–1932, 1933–1950
Harry Bruce	Labor	Kennedy	1923–1950
Frank Bulcock	Labor	Barcoo	1919–1942
Frank Butler	CPNP	Port Curtis	1929–1932
William Carter	CPNP	Fitzroy	1929–1932
Harry Clayton	CPNP	Wide Bay	1920–1946
Charles Collins	Labor	Bowen	1909–1912, 1915–1936
Charles Conroy	Labor	Maranoa	1920–1944
Frank Cooper	Labor	Bremer	1915–1946
Edward Costello	CPNP	Carnarvon	1920–1935
Owen Daniel	CPNP	Keppel	1929–1936
John Dash	Labor	Mundingburra	1920–1944
Hon William Deacon	CPNP	Cunningham	1920–1943
George Duffy	CPNP	Eacham	1929–1932
Thomas Dunlop	Independent	Rockhampton	1929–1932
Jim Edwards	CPNP	Nanango	1920–1947
Tom Foley	Labor	Leichhardt	1919–1960
James Fry	CPNP	Kurilpa	1918–1932
Ernest Grimstone	CPNP	Stanley	1928–1933
Ned Hanlon	Labor	Ithaca	1926–1952
Ted Hanson	Labor	Buranda	1924–1947
Richard Hill	CPNP	Kelvin Grove	1929–1932
Maurice Hynes	Labor	Townsville	1923–1939
Charles Jamieson	Ind./CPNP	Lockyer	1929–1932
Hon Alfred Jones	Labor	Paddington	1904–1909, 1915–1917, 1922–1932
Arthur Jones ^{[2]}	Labor	Burke	1929–1932, 1939–1960
William Kelso	CPNP	Nundah	1923–1932
James Kenny	CPNP	Cook	1929–1935
Jim Kerr	CPNP	Enoggera	1920–1932
Patrick Kerwin	CPNP	Merthyr	1929–1932
Hon Reginald King	CPNP	Logan	1920–1935
Mick Kirwan	Labor	Brisbane	1912–1932
Irene Longman^{[1]}	CPNP	Bulimba	1929–1932
Hon William McCormack^{[4]}	Labor	Cairns	1912–1930
Hon Neil MacGroarty	CPNP	South Brisbane	1929–1932
Ted Maher	CPNP	Rosewood	1929–1949
James Maxwell	CPNP	Toowong	1920–1938
Hon Arthur Moore	CPNP	Aubigny	1915–1941
Hon Godfrey Morgan	CPNP	Murilla	1909–1938
Hon John Mullan	Labor	Flinders	1908–1912, 1918–1941
Thomas Nimmo	CPNP	Oxley	1929–1943
John O'Keefe^{[4]}	Labor	Cairns	1926–1929, 1930–1942
Percy Pease	Labor	Herbert	1920–1940
Hon Jens Peterson	CPNP	Normanby	1915–1935
Tom Plunkett	CPNP	Albert	1929–1957
George Pollock	Labor	Gregory	1915–1939
Darby Riordan ^{[2]}	Labor	Burke	1918–1929
Robert Roberts	CPNP	East Toowoomba	1907–1934
Hugh Russell	CPNP	Toombul	1926–1941
Wilfred Russell	CPNP	Dalby	1926–1932
Hon Hubert Sizer	CPNP	Sandgate	1918–1935
Hon William Forgan Smith	Labor	Mackay	1915–1942
Hon James Stopford	Labor	Mount Morgan	1915–1936
Edward Swayne	CPNP	Mirani	1907–1935
Hon Charles Taylor	CPNP	Windsor	1918–1935
George Tedman	CPNP	Maree	1929–1932
Vivian Tozer	CPNP	Gympie	1929–1935
Hon Harry Walker	CPNP	Cooroora	1907–1947
James Walker	CPNP	Ipswich	1929–1932
Richard Warren	CPNP	Murrumba	1918–1932
David Weir^{[3]}	Labor	Maryborough	1917–1929
William Wellington	Labor	Charters Towers	1915–1939
Arnold Wienholt^{[5]}	Independent	Fassifern	1909–1913, 1930–1935
Hon Thomas Wilson	Labor	Fortitude Valley	1916–1933
Vern Winstanley	Labor	Queenton	1908–1932

^{1} Irene Longman, the CPNP member for Bulimba, became the first female representative in the Queensland Parliament upon her defeat of Harry Wright at the 1929 election.
^{2} On 16 September 1929, the Labor member for Burke, Darby Riordan, resigned to contest the 1929 federal election. Labor candidate Arthur Jones won the resulting by-election on 2 November 1929.
^{3} On 22 September 1929, the Labor member for Maryborough, David Weir, died. CPNP candidate John Blackley won the resulting by-election on 26 October 1929.
^{4} On 21 February 1930, the Labor member for Cairns and former Premier of Queensland, William McCormack, died. Labor candidate John O'Keefe won the resulting by-election on 10 May 1930.
^{5} On 2 May 1930, the CPNP member for Fassifern, Ernest Bell, died. Independent candidate Arnold Wienholt won the resulting by-election on 28 June 1930.

== See also ==
- 1929 Queensland state election
- Moore Ministry (Queensland) (CPNP) (1929–1932)
