= Members of the Queensland Legislative Assembly, 1932–1935 =

This is a list of members of the 26th Legislative Assembly of Queensland from 1932 to 1935, as elected at the 1932 state election held on 11 June 1932.

| Name | Party | Electorate | Term in office |
|---|---|---|---|
| James Annand ^{[4]} | CPNP | East Toowoomba | 1929–1932, 1934–1935 |
| George Barber | Labor | Bundaberg | 1901–1935 |
| George Barnes | CPNP | Warwick | 1908–1935 |
| Walter Barnes ^{[1]} | CPNP | Wynnum | 1901–1915, 1918–1933 |
| James Bayley ^{[1]} | CPNP | Wynnum | 1933–1935 |
| Randolph Bedford | Labor | Warrego | 1923–1941 |
| Roy Bell ^{[3]} | CPNP | Stanley | 1933–1938 |
| William Brand | CPNP | Isis | 1920–1950 |
| Samuel Brassington ^{[2]} | Labor | Fortitude Valley | 1927–1932, 1933–1950 |
| Hon Harry Bruce | Labor | The Tableland | 1923–1950 |
| Hon Frank Bulcock | Labor | Barcoo | 1919–1942 |
| Harry Clayton | CPNP | Wide Bay | 1920–1946 |
| Charles Collins | Labor | Bowen | 1909–1912, 1915–1936 |
| Charles Conroy | Labor | Maranoa | 1920–1944 |
| Hon Frank Cooper | Labor | Bremer | 1915–1946 |
| Kerry Copley | Labor | Kurilpa | 1932–1949 |
| William Copley | Labor | Bulimba | 1932–1938 |
| Edward Costello | CPNP | Carnarvon | 1920–1935 |
| Owen Daniel | CPNP | Keppel | 1929–1936 |
| Hon John Dash | Labor | Mundingburra | 1920–1944 |
| William Deacon | CPNP | Cunningham | 1920–1943 |
| Jim Edwards | CPNP | Nanango | 1920–1947 |
| Arthur Fadden | CPNP | Kennedy | 1932–1935 |
| Tom Foley | Labor | Normanby | 1919–1960 |
| Robert Funnell | Labor | Brisbane | 1932–1936 |
| Vince Gair | Labor | South Brisbane | 1932–1960 |
| David Gledson | Labor | Ipswich | 1915–1929, 1932–1949 |
| Ernest Grimstone ^{[3]} | CPNP | Stanley | 1928–1933 |
| Hon Ned Hanlon | Labor | Ithaca | 1926–1952 |
| Ted Hanson | Labor | Buranda | 1924–1947 |
| John Hayes | Labor | Nundah | 1932–1947 |
| Hon Maurice Hynes | Labor | Townsville | 1923–1939 |
| James Kenny | CPNP | Cook | 1929–1935 |
| James Keogh | Labor | Merthyr | 1932–1940 |
| Reginald King | CPNP | Logan | 1920–1935 |
| William King | Labor | Maree | 1932–1941 |
| James Larcombe | Labor | Rockhampton | 1912–1929, 1932–1956 |
| Evan Llewelyn | Labor | Toowoomba | 1925–1929, 1932–1935 |
| Ted Maher | CPNP | West Moreton | 1929–1949 |
| James Maxwell | CPNP | Toowong | 1920–1938 |
| Hon Arthur Moore | CPNP | Aubigny | 1915–1941 |
| Godfrey Morgan | CPNP | Murilla | 1909–1938 |
| Hon John Mullan | Labor | Carpentaria | 1908–1912, 1918–1941 |
| Frank Nicklin | CPNP | Murrumba | 1932–1968 |
| Thomas Nimmo | CPNP | Oxley | 1929–1943 |
| John O'Keefe | Labor | Cairns | 1926–1929, 1930–1942 |
| Hon Percy Pease | Labor | Herbert | 1920–1940 |
| Jens Peterson | CPNP | Fitzroy | 1915–1935 |
| Tom Plunkett | CPNP | Albert | 1929–1957 |
| Hon George Pollock | Labor | Gregory | 1915–1939 |
| Robert Roberts ^{[4]} | CPNP | East Toowoomba | 1907–1934 |
| Hugh Russell | CPNP | Hamilton | 1926–1941 |
| Hubert Sizer | CPNP | Sandgate | 1918–1935 |
| Hon William Forgan Smith | Labor | Mackay | 1915–1942 |
| Jim Sparkes | CPNP | Dalby | 1932–1935, 1941–1960 |
| Hon James Stopford | Labor | Maryborough | 1915–1936 |
| Edward Swayne | CPNP | Mirani | 1907–1935 |
| Hon Charles Taylor | CPNP | Windsor | 1918–1935 |
| George Taylor | Labor | Enoggera | 1932–1944 |
| Vivian Tozer | CPNP | Gympie | 1929–1935 |
| Harry Walker | CPNP | Cooroora | 1907–1947 |
| Frank Waters | Labor | Kelvin Grove | 1932–1938 |
| William Wellington | Labor | Charters Towers | 1915–1939 |
| Arnold Wienholt | Independent | Fassifern | 1909–1913, 1930–1935 |
| Tommy Williams | Labor | Port Curtis | 1932–1947 |
| Thomas Wilson ^{[2]} | Labor | Fortitude Valley | 1916–1933 |

^{1} On 19 February 1933, the CPNP member for Wynnum, Walter Barnes, died. CPNP candidate James Bayley won the resulting by-election on 29 April 1933.
^{2} On 19 May 1933, the Labor member for Fortitude Valley, Thomas Wilson, died. Labor candidate Samuel Brassington won the resulting by-election on 15 July 1933.
^{3} On 22 October 1933, the CPNP member for Stanley, Ernest Grimstone, died. CPNP candidate Roy Bell won the resulting by-election on 9 December 1933.
^{4} On 2 June 1934, the CPNP member for East Toowoomba, Robert Roberts, died. CPNP candidate James Annand won the resulting by-election on 18 August 1934.

== See also ==
- 1932 Queensland state election
- Forgan Smith Ministry (Labor) (1932–1942)
