= 1932 Queensland state election =

- 11 June 1932

All 62 seats in the Legislative Assembly of Queensland 32 Assembly seats were needed for a majority
- Turnout: 92.82 (▲3.67 pp)
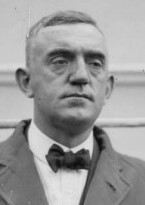

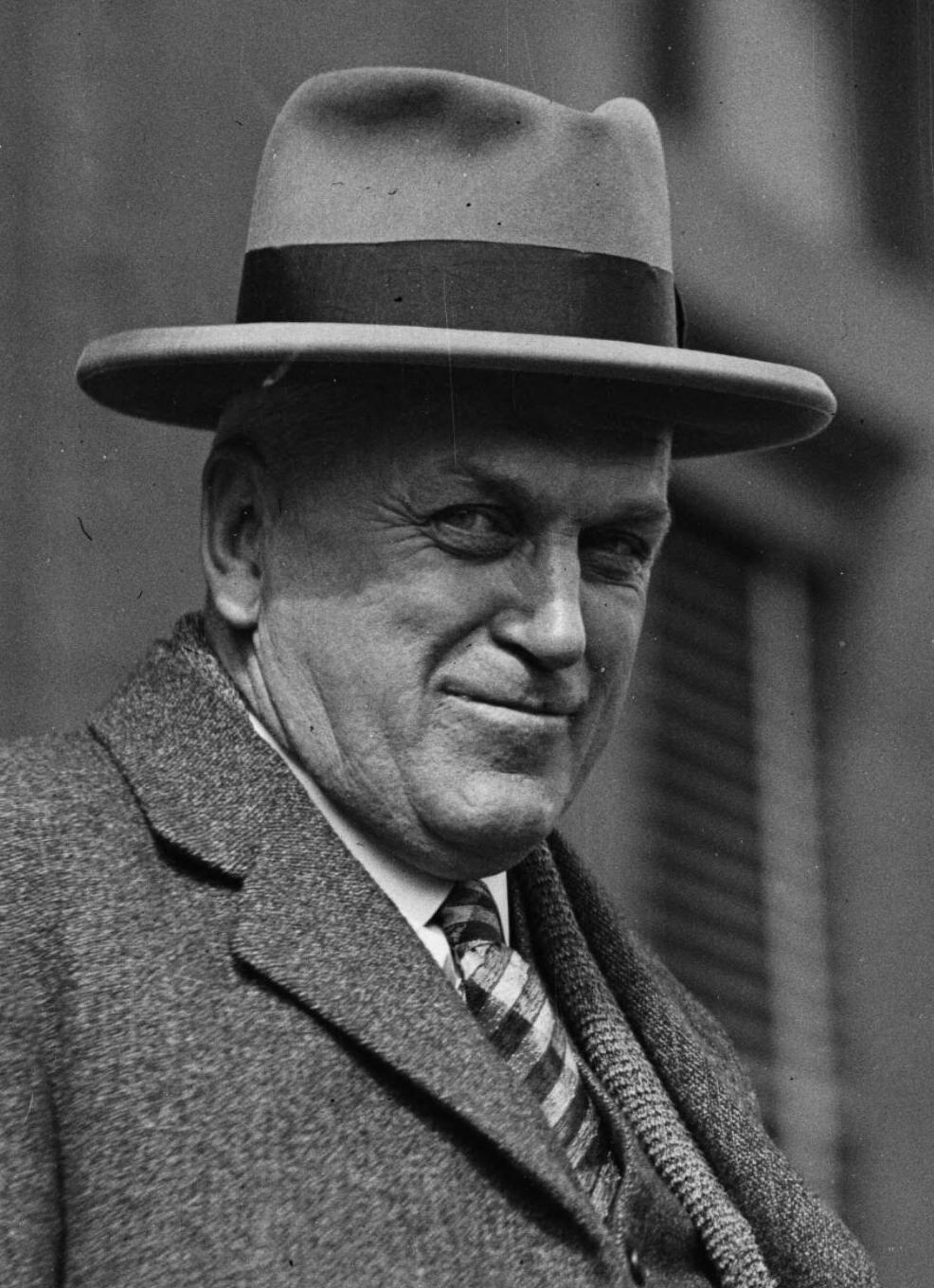
	First party	Second party
Leader	William Forgan Smith	Arthur Edward Moore
Party	Labor	CPNP
Leader since	27 May 1929	19 April 1924
Leader's seat	Mackay	Aubigny
Last election	27 seats, 40.16%	43 seats, 54.23%
Seats won	33	28
Seat change	▲6	▼15
Popular vote	225,270	204,158
Percentage	49.89%	45.21%
Swing	▲9.73	▼9.02
Premier before election
Arthur Edward Moore
CPNP
Elected Premier
William Forgan Smith
Labor

Elections were held in the Australian state of Queensland on 11 June 1932 to elect the 62 members of the state's Legislative Assembly.

The election saw the first-term Country and Progressive National Party government led by Arthur Edward Moore facing reelection and was held in the midst of the Great Depression. Labor had previously held office from 1915 until 1929.

The election resulted in the defeat of the one-term Moore government by the Labor Party, led by William Forgan Smith.

== Key dates ==
Date	Event
3 February 1932	The new electoral boundaries under the Electoral Districts Act 1931 were proclaimed.
19 April 1932	The Parliament was dissolved.
20 April 1932	Writs were issued by the Governor to proceed with an election.
28 April 1932	Close of nominations.
11 June 1932	Polling day, between the hours of 8am and 6pm.
18 June 1932	The Moore Ministry resigned and the Forgan Smith Ministry was sworn in.
2 July 1932	Polling day in the seat of Hamilton, delayed due to the death of a candidate.
16 July 1932	The writ was returned and the results formally declared.
15 August 1932	Parliament resumed for business.

== Results ==
The election saw a major swing to Labor from the 1929 election. The election took place on modified boundaries — the Assembly had been reduced by the Electoral Districts Act 1931 from 72 to 62 seats, mainly accomplished by the abolition of sitting Labor members' seats. Despite this, Labor went from a deficit of 16 seats to a surplus of 5 seats.

Queensland state election, 11 June 1932 Legislative Assembly << 1929–1935 >>
Enrolled voters	492,036^{[1]}				
Votes cast	456,706		Turnout	92.82%	+3.67%
Informal votes	5,144		Informal	1.13%	–0.43%
Summary of votes by party
Party	Primary votes	%	Swing	Seats	Change
Labor	225,270	49.89%	+9.73%	33	+5
CPNP	204,158	45.21%	–9.02%	28	-15
Queensland Party	7,590	1.68%	+1.68%	0	± 0
Independent Labor	1,831	0.41%	+0.41%	0	± 0
Communist	1,057	0.23%	–0.45%	0	± 0
Lang Labor	587	0.13%	+0.13%	0	± 0
Independent	11,069	2.45%	–2.42%	1	– 1
Total	451,562			62	

Popular vote
Labor	49.89%
CPNP	45.21%
Queensland Party	1.68%
Communist	0.23%
Lang Labor	0.13%
Independents	2.86%

Seats
Labor	53.22%
CPNP	45.16%
Independents	1.61%

^{1} 525,944 electors were enrolled to vote at the election, but 5 seats (8.1% of the total) were uncontested—4 Labor seats (two more than in 1929) representing 27,083 enrolled voters and one Independent seat (held by Arnold Wienholt) representing 6,825 enrolled voters.

== Seats changing party representation ==
There was an extensive redistribution across Queensland prior to this election, decreasing the amount of seats from 72 to 62. The seat changes are as follows.

=== Abolished seats ===
Seat	Incumbent member	Party
Balonne	Samuel Brassington	Labor
Burke	Arthur Jones	Labor
Burnett	Robert Boyd	CPNP
Burrum	William Brand	CPNP
Chillagoe	Ernest Atherton	CPNP
Eacham	George Duffy	CPNP
Flinders	John Mullan	Labor
Leichhardt	Tom Foley	Labor
Lockyer	Charles Jamieson	Independent
Mitchell	Richard Bow	Labor
Mount Morgan	James Stopford	Labor
Paddington	Alfred Jones	Labor
Queenton	Vernon Winstanley	Labor
Rosewood	Ted Maher	CPNP
Toombul	Hugh Russell	CPNP

- Members listed in italics did not run for this election.

=== New seats ===
Seat	Party	Elected member
Carpentaria	Labor	John Mullan
Hamilton	CPNP	Hugh Russell
Isis	CPNP	William Brand
The Tableland	Labor	Harry Bruce
West Moreton	CPNP	Ted Maher

=== Seats changing hands ===
Seat	Incumbent member	Party	New member	Party
Bulimba	Irene Longman	CPNP	William Copley	Labor
Enoggera	Jim Kerr	CPNP	George Taylor	Labor
Ipswich	James Walker	CPNP	David Gledson	Labor
Kelvin Grove	Richard Hill	CPNP	Frank Waters	Labor
Kennedy	Harry Bruce	Labor	Arthur Fadden	CPNP
Kurilpa	James Fry	CPNP	Kerry Copley	Labor
Maree	George Tedman	CPNP	William King	Labor
Maryborough	John Blackley*	CPNP	James Stopford	Labor
Merthyr	Patrick Kerwin	CPNP	James Keogh	Labor
Normanby	Jens Peterson	CPNP	Tom Foley	Labor
Nundah	William Kelso	CPNP	John Hayes	Labor
Port Curtis	Frank Butler	CPNP	Tommy Williams	Labor
Rockhampton	Thomas Dunlop	Independent	James Larcombe	Labor
South Brisbane	Neil MacGroarty	CPNP	Vince Gair	Labor
Toowoomba	James Annand	CPNP	Evan Llewelyn	Labor

- Members listed in italics did not recontest their seats.
- In addition, Independent MP Arnold Wienholt held the seat of Fassifern, which he had won from the CPNP at the 1930 by-election.
- The sitting member for Maryborough, John Blackley won this seat from Labor at the 1929 by-election.

== Aftermath ==
Forgan Smith went on to be premier for over 10 years, and Labor held power continuously until the party's split in 1957.

== See also ==
- Members of the Queensland Legislative Assembly, 1929–1932
- Members of the Queensland Legislative Assembly, 1932–1935
- Candidates of the Queensland state election, 1932
- Moore Ministry (Queensland)
- Forgan Smith Ministry
