= William Copley =

William Copley is the name of:

- William Copley (South Australian politician) (1845–1925), Australian politician
- William Copley (artist) (1919–1996), American artist
- William Copley (Queensland politician) (1906–1975), Australian trade union activist and politician
