= Queensland Party (1932) =

The Queensland Party was a minor political party in Queensland that was active in the 1930s. It contested the 1932 Queensland state election. It was led by T.C. Brooks, its Party President.

The Queensland Party opposed Communism and the caucus process of party politics. Its platform was that its members would be encouraged to vote freely without being bound to a party vote.

The party was largely unsuccessful at the 1932 election, its 15 candidates only picking up 1.68% of the vote. However, its preferences were required to determine the results in 3 Country and Progressive National Party-held electorates. Its preferences largely flowed toward the CPNP.

It was disbanded after the election and did not contest any Federal election.
