= Roy Bell (politician) =

Australian politician

Member of the Queensland Legislative Assembly for Stanley
- In office 9 December 1933 – 2 April 1938
- Preceded by: Ernest Grimstone
- Succeeded by: Duncan MacDonald

Personal details
- Born: Roy Mackenzie Bell; 20 March 1885 Denman, New South Wales, Australia
- Died: 20 August 1953 (aged 68) Brisbane, Queensland, Australia
- Party: CPNP
- Spouse: Grace Gladys Dangar (m.1915 d.1964)
- Occupation: Station manager

Roy Mackenzie Bell (20 March 1885 – 20 August 1953) was a member of the Queensland Legislative Assembly.

== Biography ==
Bell was born at Denman, New South Wales, the son of Federick Samuel Bell and his wife Mary Charlotte (née Mackenzie). He was educated at The King's School, Parramatta and owned or managed a series of Stations in Queensland and New South Wales.

On 22 July 1915 he married Annie Agnes Herbert (died 1964) in Singleton and together had two sons and one daughter. He died in Brisbane in August 1953 and his funeral was held at St John's Church of England Cathedral, Brisbane with his body then taken to Sydney for burial.

== Public life ==
Bell was an executive councilor on the Esk Shire Council and then in 1933 he won the by-election for the seat of Stanley, following the death of Ernest Grimstone. He held the seat until the 1938 state election when he retired from politics.

Parliament of Queensland
| Preceded by Ernest Grimstone | Member for Stanley; 1933–1938 | Succeeded by Duncan MacDonald |
