= Electoral district of Mount Morgan =

Mount Morgan Queensland—Legislative Assembly
- State: Queensland
- Created: 1912
- Abolished: 1932
- Namesake: Mount Morgan, Queensland
- Demographic: Rural
- Coordinates: 23°39′S 150°23′E

The electoral district of Mount Morgan was a Legislative Assembly electorate in the state of Queensland, Australia, centred on the town of Mount Morgan.

== History ==
Mount Morgan was created by the Electoral Districts Act of 1911, taking effect at the 1912 state election, and existed until the 1932 state election. It was based on the former electorates of Logan and Maree.

When Mount Morgan was abolished in 1932, its area was incorporated into the electoral district of Fitzroy.

== Members ==
The following people were elected in the seat of Mount Morgan:

Member	Party	Term
James Crawford	Ministerial	Apr 1912 – May 1915
James Stopford	Labor	May 1915 – Jun 1932

Crawford previously represented Fitzroy (1909–1912).
Stopford subsequently represented Maryborough (1932–1936).
