= Tommy Williams (Queensland politician) =

Australian politician

The Honourable Tommy Williams JP
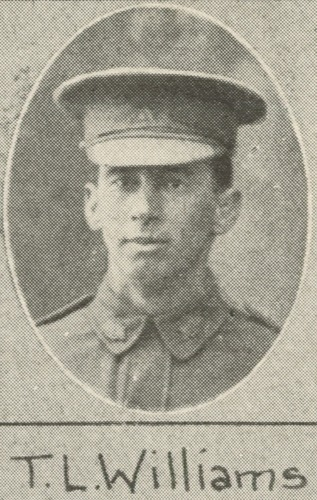
- Williams in 1917

Member of the Queensland Legislative Assembly for Port Curtis
- In office 11 June 1932 – 3 May 1947
- Preceded by: Frank Butler
- Succeeded by: Jim Burrows

Personal details
- Born: Thomas Lewis Williams; 21 December 1886 Bundamba, Queensland, Australia
- Died: 17 August 1970 (aged 83) Toowoomba, Queensland, Australia
- Party: Labor
- Spouse: Lilian Maud Garrard (m.1915 d.1966)
- Occupation: School teacher

Thomas Lewis Williams (21 December 1886 – 17 August 1970) was a member of the Queensland Legislative Assembly.

== Biography ==
Williams was born at Bundamba, Queensland, the son of Thomas Williams and his wife Diane (née Philip). He was educated at Bundamba State School, Newtown State School and St Mary's College, Ipswich. On leaving, he became a school teacher and taught at various state schools around southern Queensland before working for the Queensland Times and Daily Mail newspapers.

In April 1908 he married Lilian Maud Garrard (died 1966) and together had two sons and three daughters.

In August 1917, he enlisted in the Australian Imperial Force to fight in World War I.

Williams died at Toowoomba in August 1970.

== Public life ==
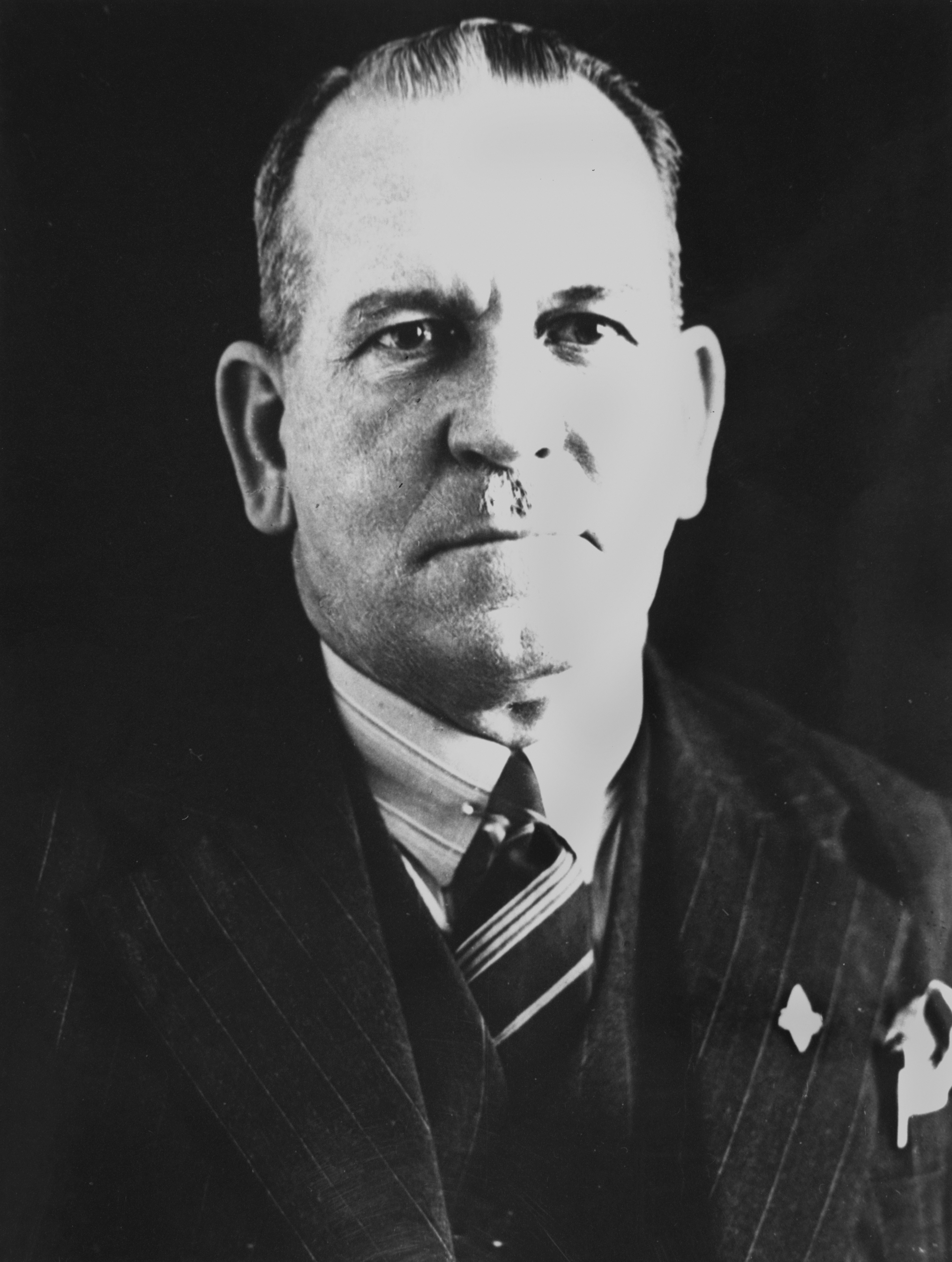
Thomas Lewis Williams, Queensland Minister for Public Instruction, circa 1946

Williams, representing the Labor party, won the seat of Port Curtis at the 1932 Queensland state election. He held it for the next fifteen years only to lose Labor pre-selection before the 1947 Queensland state election.

He held various roles in the parliament including:

- Government Whip 1932–1947
- Secretary for Agriculture and Stock 1942–1946
- Secretary for Public Instruction 1946–1947

He was also a councilor on the Gayndah Town Council. He was also a member of the Royal Historical Society and Royal Geographical Society, and honorary inspector for the Queensland Society for Prevention of Cruelty.

Parliament of Queensland
Preceded by Frank Butler	Member for Port Curtis; 1932–1947	Succeeded by Jim Burrows
