= David Weir (politician) =

Australian politician (1881–1929)

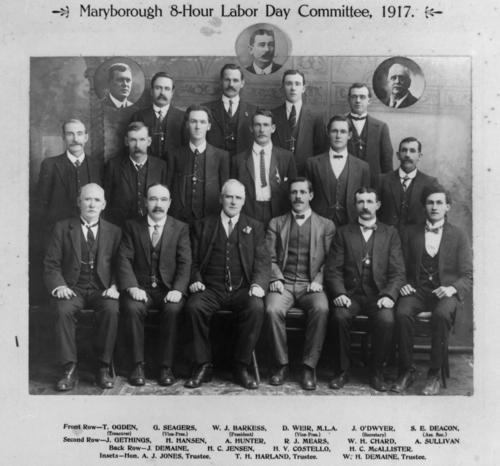
- Eight Hour Labor Day Committee, Maryborough, 1917 - Weir is fourth from the left, front row

Member of the Queensland Legislative Assembly for Maryborough
- In office 31 March 1917 – 22 September 1929
- Preceded by: Alfred Jones
- Succeeded by: John Blackley

Personal details
- Born: David Weir; 23 December 1881 Glasgow, Scotland
- Died: 22 September 1929 (aged 47) Maryborough, Queensland, Australia
- Resting place: Maryborough Cemetery
- Party: Labour Party
- Spouse: Edith Guymer (m. 1907 d.1960)
- Occupation: Clerk

David Weir (23 December 1881 – 22 September 1929) was a member of the Queensland Legislative Assembly.

He was born at Glasgow, Scotland, the son of John Weir and his wife Jeannie (née Kerr) and migrated with his family to Australia the following year. They arrived in Townsville and he was educated at the Townsville Central State School and Townsville Grammar School. He began his working career as a clerk with the Adelaide Steamship Company in 1895 before joining the Queensland Railways and working there as a clerk. In this position he was transferred across the state, including Townsville, Maryborough, and Ipswich.

On 5 July 1907 he married Edith Guymer (died 1960) and together had two sons and a daughter. Weir died in September 1929 and his funeral proceeded from his former residence in Alice Street to the Maryborough Cemetery.

== Public career ==
Weir, a member of the Labour Party, served as an alderman on the Maryborough City Council for one term. Following the resignation of Alfred Jones the sitting member for Maryborough to join the Queensland Legislative Council, Weir won the resulting by-election in 1917. He beat the National candidate, Mr Harding, and in fact increased the Labour vote from the previous state election.

He had represented the electorate for over twelve years when he died in office after a short illness in 1929.

Parliament of Queensland
Preceded by Alfred Jones	Member for Maryborough; 1917–1929	Succeeded by John Blackley
