= Charles Jamieson (politician) =

Australian politician

Member of the Queensland Legislative Assembly for Lockyer
- In office 11 May 1929 – 11 June 1932
- Preceded by: George Logan
- Succeeded by: Seat abolished

Personal details
- Born: Charles Henry Jamieson; 23 July 1888 Bega, New South Wales, Australia
- Died: 26 July 1959 (aged 71) Bundaberg, Queensland, Australia
- Party: Independent
- Spouse: Edith Mary Wilson (m.1912)
- Occupation: Farmer

Charles Henry Jamieson (23 July 1888 – 26 July 1959) was a member of the Queensland Legislative Assembly.

Jamieson was born in Bega, New South Wales, the son of Edward Jamieson and his wife Mary Ann (née Keys). He attended Bega State School and after finishing his education moved to Queensland where he managed a farm at Tent Hill, in the Gatton region.

On 10 October 1912 he married Edith Mary Wilson and together had a son and two daughters. Jamieson died at Bundaberg in July 1959.

== Public career ==
Jamieson, an independent politician, won the seat of Lockyer at the 1929 Queensland state election. He defeated the sitting member, George Logan, who was representing the Country and Progressive National Party. He held the electorate for three years, retiring at the 1932 Queensland state election when Lockyer was abolished. He had previously been a Councilor on the Gatton Shire Council.

He was President of the Australian Dairy Farmers' Federation from 1948, and the founding President of the Queensland Dairymen's Organisation in 1946–1954. Jamieson was also a Queensland representative of the Dairy Produce Export Board, the District Council Chairman of West Moreton Dairymen's Organisation, and a member of the Dairy Produce Production Costs Committee.

== Family ==
Parliament of Queensland
Preceded by George Logan	Member for Lockyer; 1929–1932	Abolished
