= Irene Longman =

Australian politician

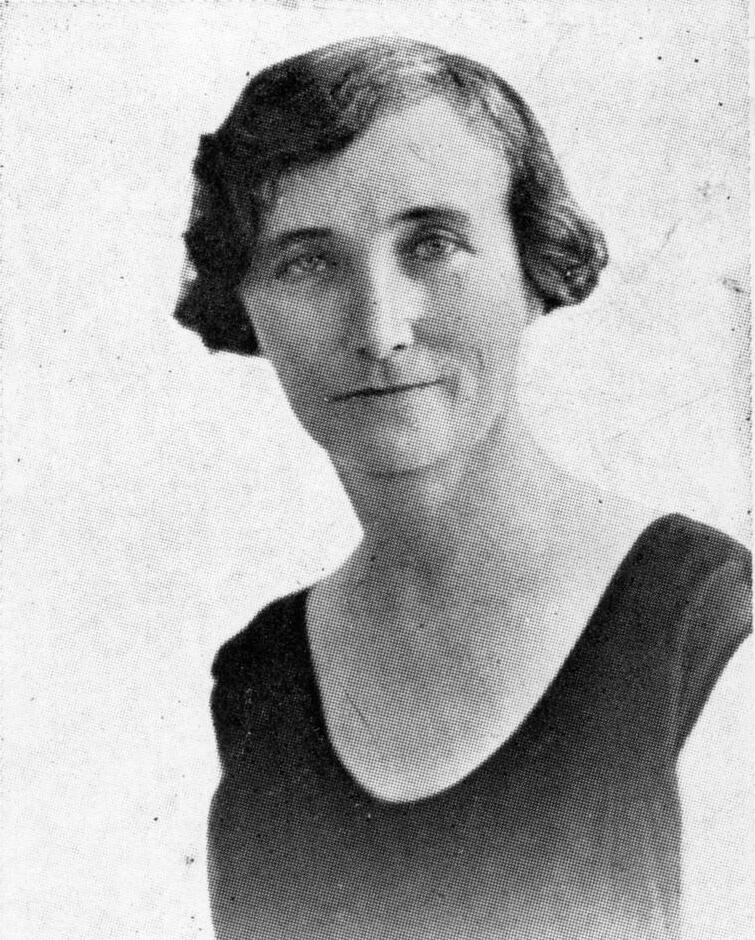
- Longman c. 1930

Member of the Queensland Legislative Assembly for Bulimba
- In office 11 May 1929 – 19 April 1932
- Preceded by: Albert Wright
- Succeeded by: William Copley

Personal details
- Born: Irene Maud Bayley; 24 April 1877 Franklin, Tasmania Colony, British Empire
- Died: 29 July 1964 (aged 87) Brisbane, Queensland, Australia
- Party: Country and Progressive National Party
- Spouse: Heber Longman (m. 1904; died 1954)
- Relations: Percy Bayley (brother); James Bayley (brother)
- Education: Sydney Girls High School; Sydney Church of England Girls' Grammar School
- Occupation: Kindergarten teacher

Irene Maud Longman (née Bayley; 24 April 1877 – 29 July 1964) was an Australian community worker and politician. She was the first woman elected to the Parliament of Queensland, representing the Queensland Legislative Assembly seat of Bulimba from 1929 to 1932 as a member of the Country and Progressive National Party (CPNP).

Longman was born in Franklin, Tasmania, to a Christian minister; her brothers Percy and James were also members of parliament. She was educated in Sydney and trained as a kindergarten teacher, later moving to Queensland where she married Heber Longman. The couple settled in Brisbane where she became involved in various community organisations relating to education and women's rights. Longman served as state president of the National Council of Women from 1921 to 1924. She was elected to parliament at the 1929 state election with the support of the Queensland Women's Electoral League, but lost her seat after a single term when the CPNP suffered a landslide defeat in 1932. In parliament she concentrated on matters relating to women and children.

== Early life ==
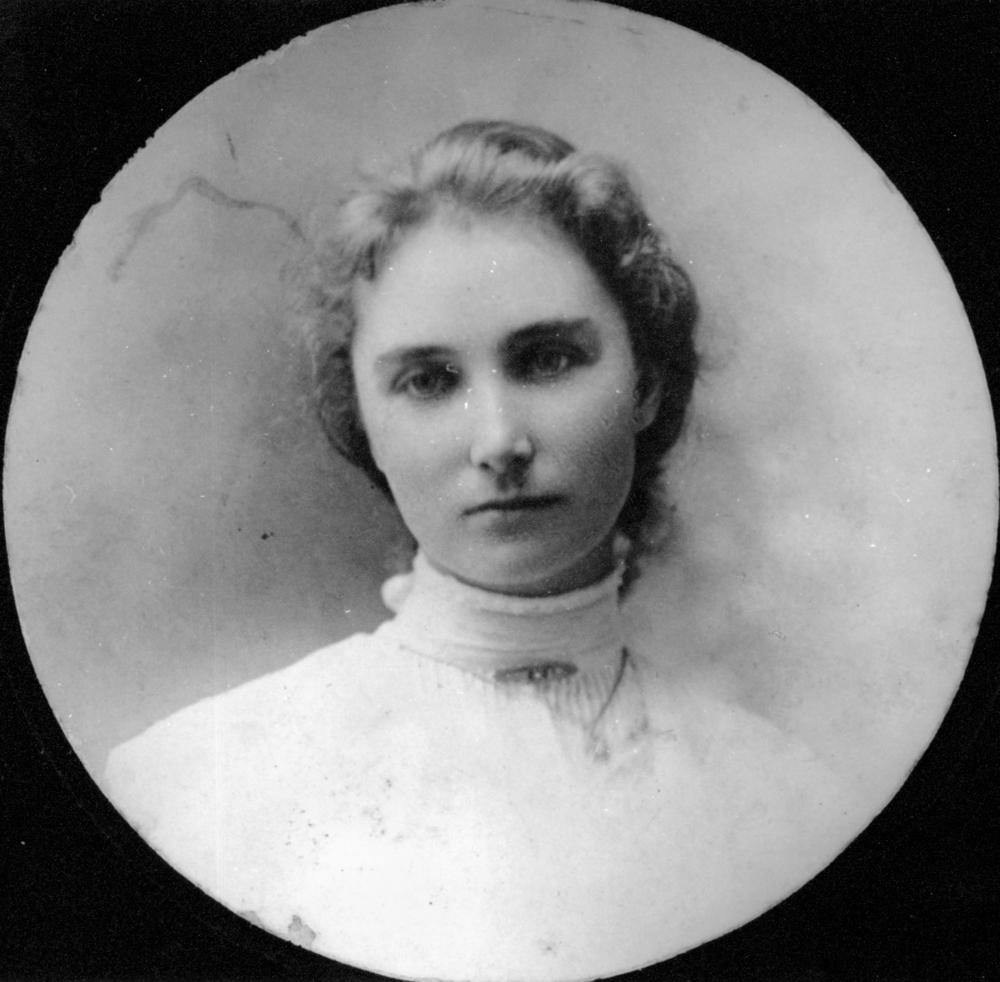
Irene Longman at a young age

Longman was born on 24 April 1877 in Franklin, Tasmania. She was the daughter of Mary Alice (née Frencham) and James Molineux Bayley; her father was a Congregationalist minister. Her brothers Percy and James also served as members of parliament.

Longman was educated in Sydney, attending Sydney Girls High School and Sydney Church of England Girls' Grammar School. She trained as a kindergarten teacher under Maybanke Wolstenholme, whose private institution Maybanke College taught Friedrich Fröbel's educational theory and also borrowed from theosophy. She boarded with Wolstenholme's friends Cara and Edgeworth David while completing her education; Wolstenholme and Cara David were feminists and leading proponents of educational reform in New South Wales.

In 1895, Longman joined her family in Queensland, where she taught at Rockhampton Girls Grammar School. She married newspaper proprietor and zoologist Heber Longman in Toowoomba in 1904; the couple had no children. They moved to Brisbane in 1911 where her husband joined the staff of the Queensland Museum.

== Community work ==
Longman was "interested in a wide range of social issues, including town planning and the preservation of native plants, but her work was principally in the field of the welfare of women and especially children". She "enjoyed her positions of leadership and focused her contribution on addressing meetings and attending functions rather than the more mundane task of fund-raising". Longman was the first secretary of the Playground Association of Queensland and was a supervisor and trainer for the Crèche and Kindergarten Association. She served as president of the National Council of Women of Queensland from 1920 to 1924 and was later made a life member of the organisation. She also held office in the Lyceum Club, the Queensland Women's Peace Movement, and the Association for the Welfare of Mental Deficients. Longman was a pioneer of special education in Queensland, in 1922 leading a deputation to the Department of Public Instruction which brought about the introduction of "opportunity classes" for children with intellectual disabilities. She advocated segregation of people with intellectual disabilities from the rest of the community and sterilisation of those who could not be separated from the community.

== Politics ==
Irene Longman's parliamentary career began in the 1929 election. Representing the Country and Progressive National Party, she was elected to the Queensland Legislative Assembly in the electorate of Bulimba, a safe ALP seat, which she held for one term. While in Parliament, she was responsible for the first appointment of a Queensland woman police officer, and spoke about the welfare of children. Being a woman, she was never allowed to use the parliamentary dining room and had to eat her meals on the verandah. As well, there were no female toilets in the parliament building. Longman lost her seat in the 1932 election and did not re-contest it.

Longman had two brothers who were also members of the Queensland Parliament: Percy Bayley represented Pittsworth from 1915 to 1920, and James Bayley was the member for Wynnum from 1933 to 1935.

== Legacy ==
Longman was the only woman elected to the Parliament of Queensland in her lifetime. The federal electorate of Longman, created in 1996, is named after Irene, as is Longman Street in the Canberra suburb of Chisholm.

== Later life ==
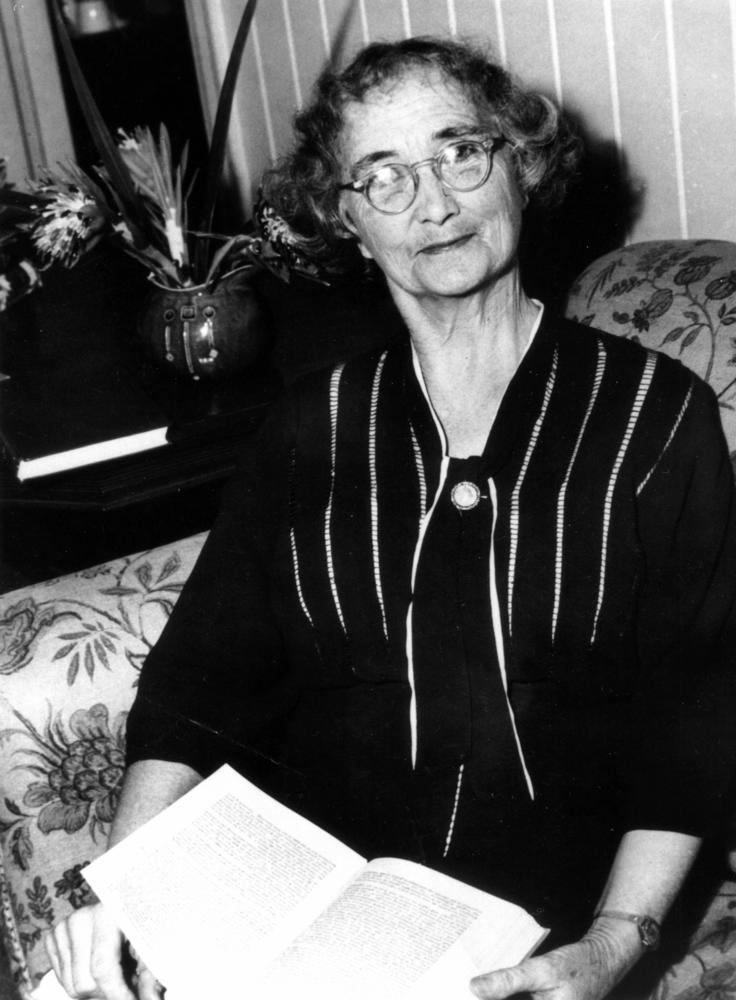
Longman in 1950

Irene Longman died on 29 July 1964 in St. Andrew's Hospital in Brisbane and was privately cremated.

== Media ==
Singer/songwriter Kelly Chase released the song "Sticks and Stones" to accompany the History Detective Podcast Episode Season 2, Episode 7: Irene Longman the First Woman in Queensland Parliament.

Parliament of Queensland
Preceded by Albert Wright	Member for Bulimba; 1929–1932	Succeeded by William Copley
