= Richard Bow =

Australian politician

Member of the Queensland Legislative Assembly for Mitchell
- In office 26 May 1928 – 11 June 1932
- Preceded by: John Payne
- Succeeded by: Seat abolished

Personal details
- Born: Richard Rowland Bow; 3 August 1868 Brisbane, Queensland, Australia
- Died: 11 June 1941 (aged 72) Brisbane, Queensland, Australia
- Resting place: South Brisbane Cemetery
- Party: Labor
- Spouse: Elizabeth Ann Baker (m.1901 d.1947)
- Occupation: Butcher, Trade union secretary

Richard Rowland Bow (3 August 1868 – 11 June 1941) was a member of the Queensland Legislative Assembly.

== Biography ==
Bow was born in Brisbane, Queensland, the son of David Bow and his wife Margaret Theresa (née Berry). By 1894 he was a butcher in Longreach 1894 and a stock inspector at the Brisbane abattoir. He then became an inspector at the abattoir.

On 22 June 1901 Bow married Elizabeth Ann Baker (died 1947) and together had one daughter. He died in 1941 in an accident at the Cannon Hill Queensland Meat Industry Board while he was supervising the unloading of stock from railway wagons. He fell between the platform and a moving train and died in the Brisbane General Hospital that night. His funeral proceeded from the funeral chapel of K.M. Smith in Fortitude Valley to the South Brisbane Cemetery.

== Public life ==
Bow was involved in the Barcaldine Strike Camp during the 1891 Australian shearers' strike and was a secretary of the Australian Workers' Union in Central Queensland from 1910 until 1928.

In 1928 he won the by-election held to replace John Payne who had died earlier in the year. He held the seat until it was abolished before the 1932 state election whereupon he retired from politics.

Parliament of Queensland
Preceded by John Payne	Member for Mitchell; 1928–1932	Abolished
