= John Blackley (politician) =

Australian politician

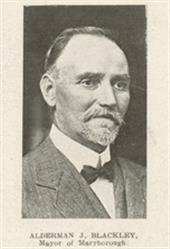
- John Blackley - February 1915

Member of the Queensland Legislative Assembly for Maryborough
- In office 26 October 1929 – 11 June 1932
- Preceded by: David Weir
- Succeeded by: James Stopford

Personal details
- Born: John Blackley; 6 January 1862 Scotland
- Died: 10 March 1952 (aged 90) Maryborough, Queensland, Australia
- Resting place: Maryborough Cemetery
- Party: Country and Progressive National Party
- Spouse: Elizabeth Blackley (m. 1883 d.1942)
- Occupation: Aerated water manufacturer

John Blackley (6 January 1862 – 10 March 1952) was a member of the Queensland Legislative Assembly.

== Biography ==
Blackley was born in Scotland, and came to Australia as a young man. Settling in Maryborough, he went into business manufacturing aerated water.

In 1883 he married Elizabeth Andrew (died 1942) and together had three sons and two daughters. He died in Maryborough in March 1952 and his funeral proceeded from St Stephens Presbyterian Church to the Maryborough Cemetery.

== Public career ==
Blackley started off in politics as an alderman on the Maryborough City Council between 1915 and 1922 and for part of that time he was the city's Mayor.

He stood as the Country and Progressive National Party candidate at the 1929 Queensland state election, but was beaten by Labor's David Weir. Weir died three months later and Blackley won the resulting by-election in October of that year, defeating Labor's Kerry Copley. He represented the electorate until the 1932 Queensland state election when he was defeated by James Stopford of the Labor Party.

Parliament of Queensland
Preceded by David Weir	Member for Maryborough; 1929–1932	Succeeded by James Stopford
