= Frank Butler (politician) =

Australian politician

Frank Wells Butler

Member of the Queensland Legislative Assembly for Port Curtis
- In office 11 May 1929 – 11 Jun 1932
- Preceded by: George Carter
- Succeeded by: Tommy Williams

Personal details
- Born: Frank Wells Butler; 18 August 1884 Kilcoy, Queensland, Australia
- Died: 25 July 1961 (aged 76) Gladstone, Queensland, Australia
- Party: CPNP
- Spouse: Margaret Steel (m.1915)
- Occupation: Dairy farmer

Frank Wells Butler (18 August 1884 – 25 July 1961) was a member of the Queensland Legislative Assembly.

== Biography ==
Butler was born at Kilcoy, Queensland, the son of William Butler and his wife Jane (née Graham). He was educated privately at Kilcoy Station and then attended Brisbane Grammar School. He managed his father's dairy property on the Brisbane River until 1910 and then managed and later owned Targinnie Station.

He married Margaret Steel in Sydney in 1915 and together had four children. Butler died at Gladstone in July 1961.

== Public life ==
Butler, representing the CPNP, won the seat of Port Curtis at the 1929 Queensland state election. He held it for one term, being defeated by Tommy Williams of the Labor Party.

He was a member of the Port Curtis Pastoral Association, and a councilor and chairman of the Calliope Shire Council.

Parliament of Queensland
Preceded by George Carter	Member for Port Curtis; 1929–1932	Succeeded by Tommy Williams
