= Ernest Grimstone =

Australian politician

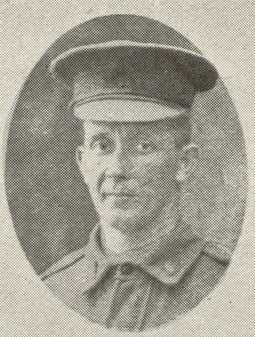
- Ernest Lancelot Grimstone in military uniform, 1917

Member of the Queensland Legislative Assembly for Stanley
- In office 22 February 1928 – 22 October 1933
- Preceded by: Frederick Nott
- Succeeded by: Roy Bell

Personal details
- Born: Ernest Lancelot Grimstone; 1883 Mackay, Queensland, Australia
- Died: 22 October 1933 (aged 49 or 50) Esk, Queensland, Australia
- Resting place: Toowong Cemetery
- Party: Country and Progressive National Party
- Spouse: Georgina Mayne Raine (m.1909 d.1973)
- Occupation: School teacher

Ernest Lancelot Grimstone (1883 – 22 October 1933) was an Australian politician. He was a Country and Progressive National Party member of the Queensland Legislative Assembly from 1928 until 1933, representing the electorate of Stanley.

Grimstone was born and educated in Mackay. He worked for the North Eton Sugar Milling Company after leaving school, but became a career teacher with the Queensland Department of Education after 1904. He taught at Ulam, near Rockhampton, Windorah West, Forsayth and Springsure, before being appointed headmaster at Yarraman Creek State School. While teaching on the Darling Downs, he also farmed experimental lots, mainly dealing in wheat and corn.

Grimstone enlisted to fight during World War I, training at the Royal Military College, Duntroon, and being commissioned as a lieutenant. He subsequently served with the 9th Battalion in France from May to November 1918. Following the end of the war, he returned to Yarraman, where he became involved in the local community, serving as chairman of the local ambulance committee and as vice-president of the local branch of the Royal Automobile Club of Queensland.

He was elected to the Legislative Assembly at a 1928 by-election, following the death of the incumbent member, Frederick Nott, defeating former MP and independent candidate, Henry Somerset, by 520 votes. Grimstone was re-elected by a much larger margin at the 1929 state election without Somerset on the ballot. When the Country and Progressive National Party (CPNP) won the 1932 state election under Arthur Moore, Grimstone was appointed to the panel of temporary Chairman of Committees and as assistant secretary of the Country Party group of government members. The Courier-Mail reported that Grimstone was a "popular member on both sides of the House" and that "his tolerance and his broadmindedness won him popularity".

Grimstone suffered a seizure at Toogoolawah in 1933, from which he never fully recovered. He suffered a further seizure while on a visit to Esk in October, and died at the Esk Hospital on 22 October without regaining consciousness. Labor leader William Forgan Smith expressed shock at Grimstone's sudden death, because it had been reported that his health was improving. Grimstone was buried at Toowong Cemetery. The resulting by-election was easily won by CPNP candidate, Roy Bell, in the absence of a Labor candidate.

Parliament of Queensland
Preceded by Frederick Lancelot Nott	Member for Stanley; 1928–1933	Succeeded by Roy Bell
