= James Walker (Queensland politician) =

Australian politician

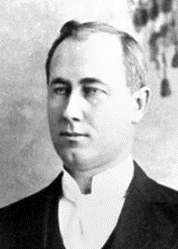

Member of the Queensland Legislative Assembly for Ipswich
- In office 11 May 1929 – 11 Jun 1932
- Preceded by: David Gledson
- Succeeded by: David Gledson

Personal details
- Born: James Ernest Walker; 3 November 1869 Melbourne, Victoria, Australia
- Died: 9 November 1939 (aged 70) Ipswich, Queensland, Australia
- Party: CPNP
- Spouse: Vera Bridson Cribb (m.1905 d.1963)
- Relations: Thomas Bridson Cribb (father-in-law)
- Education: University of Sydney
- Occupation: Lawyer

James Ernest Walker (3 November 1869 – 9 November 1939) was a lawyer and member of the Queensland Legislative Assembly.

== Biography ==
Walker was born in Melbourne, Victoria, to parents Reverend Joseph Walker and his wife Harriet (née Ives). He attended Scots College in Ballarat before his father was appointed Minister of the Central Congregationalist Church in Ipswich. Upon leaving school he attended the University of Sydney where he graduated with honours for both a BA and LL.B.

Returning to Ipswich he started a law firm around 1899 before entering into a partnership with his brother to form Walker and Walker in 1901. This firm was to be Walker's main employment for the next 25 years. He was a director of Ipswich Woollen Co., South British Insurance Co. in Brisbane, and Medical and Surgical Requisites Ltd.

On the 27th Sep 1905 he married Vera Bridson Cribb (died 1963), the daughter of former Ipswich member, Thomas Bridson Cribb and they had three sons and one daughter. He died in November 1939 in Ipswich and was Cremated at Mt Thompson Crematorium.

== Public career ==
Walker, the CPNP candidate, won the seat of Ipswich in the Queensland Legislative Assembly in 1929. He held it for one term and was defeated in 1932.

He was a member of the Freemasons being the first initiate in the Modestia Lodge. He became the Worshipful Master in 1916-1917. He was the Deputy-Grand Registrar in the Grand Lodge, and Past Grand Senior Warden.

Parliament of Queensland
Preceded by David Gledson	Member for Ipswich; 1929–1932	Succeeded by David Gledson
