= James Stopford (Australian politician) =

Australian politician

The Hon James Stopford
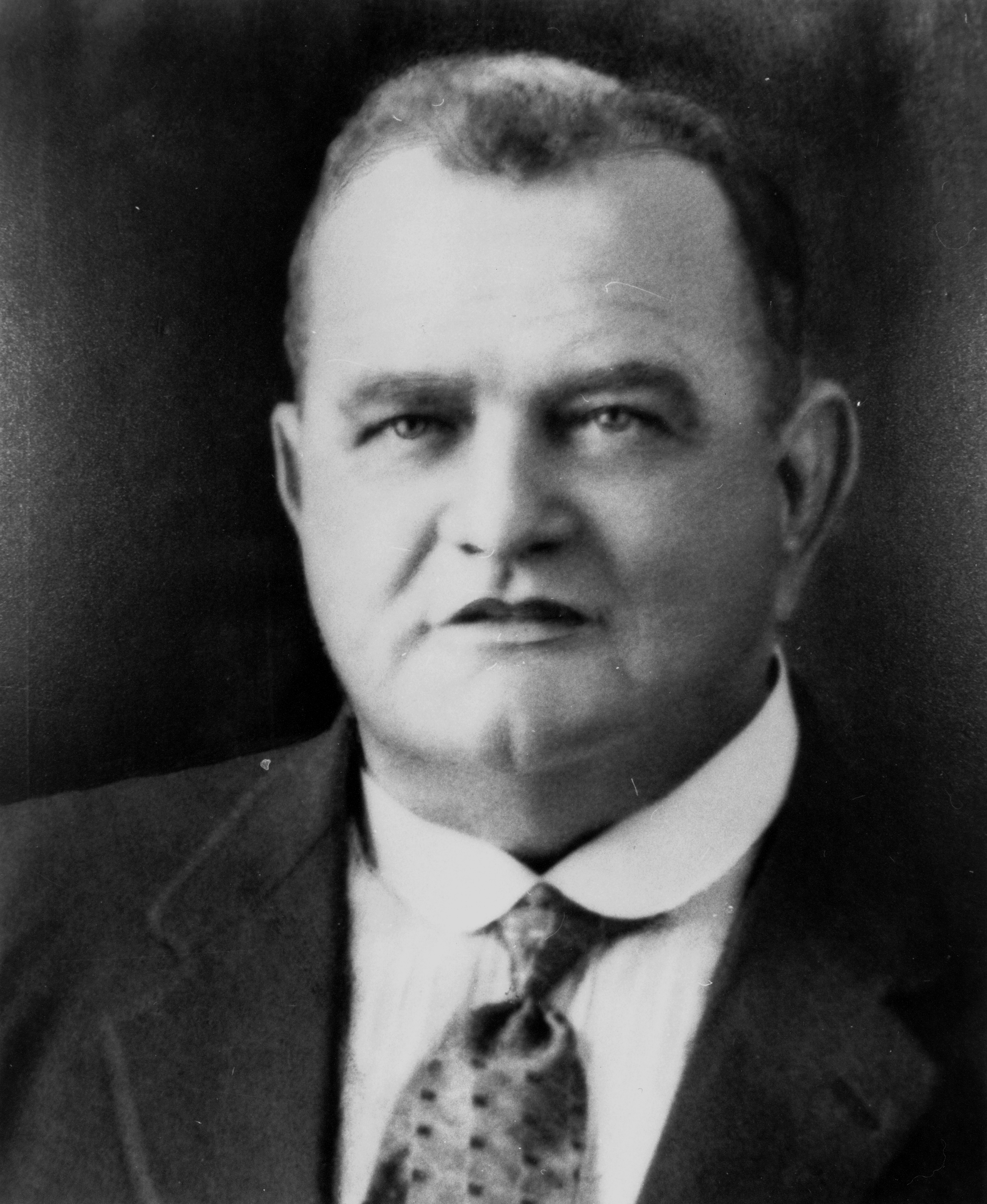

Member of the Queensland Legislative Assembly for Mount Morgan
- In office 22 May 1915 – 11 June 1932
- Preceded by: James Crawford
- Succeeded by: Seat abolished

Member of the Queensland Legislative Assembly for Maryborough
- In office 11 June 1932 – 30 November 1936
- Preceded by: John Blackley
- Succeeded by: William Demaine

Personal details
- Born: James Stopford; 22 July 1878 Rockhampton, Queensland, Australia
- Died: 30 November 1936 (aged 58) Brisbane, Queensland, Australia
- Resting place: Toowong Cemetery
- Party: Labor
- Spouse: Ellen Williams (d. 1930)
- Occupation: Miner

James (Stoppy) Stopford (22 July 1878 – 30 November 1936) was an Australian miner, union organiser and Labor politician from Mount Morgan, Queensland. He was a Member of the Queensland Legislative Assembly for Mount Morgan from 1915 until 1932, and then Maryborough until his death in 1936.

== Early life ==
James Stopford was born on 22 July 1878 in Rockhampton, the son of John Joshua Stopford and his wife Elizabeth (née Wilson). His family moved to Mount Morgan when he was two years old. He attended Mount Morgan State School.

James Stopford commenced his working life as a miner and engine driver at the Mount Morgan Mine. He was an active member of the Labor Party and the Australian Workers Union and was dismissed by the company for his union activity. He later become an organiser for the union and a member of the branch executive for the party.

He married Ellen Williams in 1901.

== Politics ==
A member of the Australian Labour Party, James Stopford contested the newly created electorate of Mount Morgan in the 1912 election but was unsuccessful (Ministerialist James Crawford was elected). However, he was elected to the Queensland Legislative Assembly in the Mount Morgan in the 1915 election and held the seat until the 1932 election. During that time, he was a Minister without Office from 6 October 1922 to 2 July 1923 and then Home Secretary from 2 July 1923 to 21 May 1929.

At the 1932 state election, the seat of Mount Morgan was abolished and absorbed into Fitzroy, so Stopford decided to contest Maryborough against the sitting member John Blackley of the Country and Progressive National Party. As part of a statewide swing to the Labor Party, Stopford was elected with a majority of 6,000 in Maryborough. Stopford held Maryborough in the 1935 election. While representing Maryborough, Stopford was appointed Secretary for Mines from 17 June 1932.

== Death ==
Stopford was admitted to the Mater Misericordiae Hospital on 16 September 1936 with a serious condition described as "blood pressure" at the time but later as a "severe haemorrhage". He was released from hospital in early October for further recuperation at his home in Coorparoo. Although he briefly attended Parliament and a Cabinet meeting, he remained too ill to undertake his regular duties and went to Southport for further recuperation. On 30 November 1936, he suffered further haemorrhaging at Southport and was rushed by ambulance to the Mater Misericordiae Hospital in Brisbane, where he died later that day.

A state funeral was held at St Stephen's Cathedral in Brisbane on 1 December 1936 after which he was buried in Toowong Cemetery. His wife and daughter predeceased him.

== Legacy ==
In 1936, The Worker said that Stopford's greatest contribution was through his efforts to provide for miners who were suffering from miner's phthisis. Labor candidate William Demaine won the resulting by-election in Maryborough on 27 February 1937.

Parliament of Queensland
Preceded by James Crawford	Member for Mount Morgan; 1915–1932	Abolished
Preceded by John Blackley	Member for Maryborough; 1932–1936	Succeeded by William Demaine
