= Thomas Dunlop (Australian politician) =

Australian politician

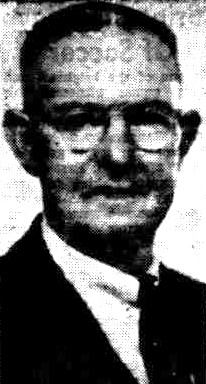

Member of the Queensland Legislative Assembly for Rockhampton
- In office 11 May 1929 – 11 June 1932
- Preceded by: George Farrell
- Succeeded by: James Larcombe

Personal details
- Born: Thomas Alberto Dunlop; 6 April 1880 Rockhampton, Queensland, Australia
- Died: 25 January 1956 (aged 75) Rockhampton, Queensland, Australia
- Resting place: Rockhampton Cemetery
- Party: Independent
- Spouse: Harriet Glazier (m.1908 d.1965)
- Occupation: Clerk

Thomas Alberto Dunlop (6 April 1880 – 25 January 1956) was a member of the Queensland Legislative Assembly.

== Biography ==
Dunlop was born in Rockhampton, Queensland, the son of John Johnson Dunlop and his wife Helen (née Fleming) and educated at the Central Boys' School in Rockhampton and later J.D. Gillespie's Commercial School. After finishing his education he was a clerk in the office of former member for Rockhampton, George Curtis from 1896 to 1898. He then joined the railways where, except for a short time in 1912, he worked for the rest of his career. In 1912 he was employed in the office of Burns Philp.

In 1908 Dunlop married Harriet Glazier in Rockhampton and together had three sons and a daughter. He died in January 1956 and was buried in the Rockhampton Cemetery.

== Public career ==
Dunlop entered politics in 1927 as an alderman on the Rockhampton City Council including as mayor from 1927 until 1929. He remained on the council until 1949. At the 1929 Queensland state election he won the seat of Rockhampton as an independent, defeating the sitting Labor member, George Farrell. He held the seat for three years, being defeated by Labor candidate, James Larcombe.

Parliament of Queensland
Preceded by George Farrell	Member for Rockhampton; 1929–1932	Succeeded by James Larcombe
