= William Copley (Queensland politician) =

Australian activist and politician (1906–1975)

William John (Jack) Copley (23 September 1906 in Ipswich, Queensland – 21 April 1975 in Brisbane, Queensland) was an Australian trade union activist and politician. Copley was the Labor member of the Queensland state Parliament for the electoral district of Bulimba from 1932 to 1938.
