= Samuel Brassington =

Australian politician

The Hon Samuel Brassington
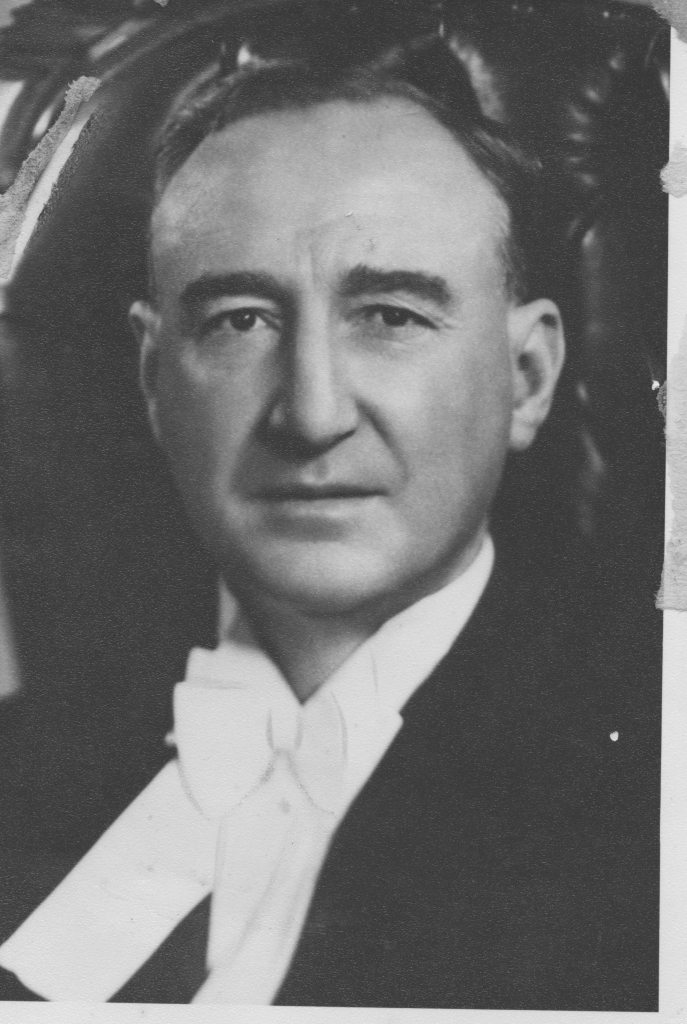

Speaker of the Queensland Parliament
- In office 1 August 1944 – 4 October 1950
- Preceded by: Ted Hanson
- Succeeded by: Johnno Mann
- Constituency: Fortitude Valley

Member of the Queensland Legislative Assembly for Balonne
- In office 6 August 1927 – 11 June 1932
- Preceded by: Edward Land
- Succeeded by: Seat abolished

Member of the Queensland Legislative Assembly for Fortitude Valley
- In office 15 July 1933 – 4 October 1950
- Preceded by: Thomas Wilson
- Succeeded by: Michael Brosnan

Personal details
- Born: Samuel John Brassington; 6 May 1901 Augathella, Queensland
- Died: 4 October 1950 (aged 49) Brisbane, Queensland
- Resting place: Toowong Cemetery
- Party: Labor
- Spouse: Merle Eileen Booth
- Occupation: Union official

Samuel John Brassington (6 May 1901 – 4 October 1950) was an Australian politician. He was a Labor member of the Legislative Assembly of Queensland, serving as the member for Balonne from 1927 to 1932 and for Fortitude Valley from 1933 to 1950. He served as Speaker of the Legislative Assembly of Queensland from 1944 to 1950.

Upon his death in 1950, Brassington was accorded a State funeral which was held at St Stephen's Cathedral and proceeded to Toowong Cemetery.

Parliament of Queensland
Preceded by Ted Hanson	Speaker of the Legislative Assembly; 1944–1950	Succeeded by Johnno Mann
Preceded by Edward Land	Member for Balonne; 1927–1932	Succeeded by John Taylor
Preceded by Thomas Wilson	Member for Fortitude Valley; 1933–1950	Succeeded by Michael Brosnan
