= Country and Progressive National Party =

Former political party in Queensland, Australia

The Country and Progressive National Party was a short-lived conservative political party in the Australian state of Queensland. Formed in 1925, it combined the state's conservative forces in a single party and held office between 1929 and 1932 under the leadership of Arthur Edward Moore. Following repeated election defeat it split into separate rural and urban wings in 1936.

== History ==
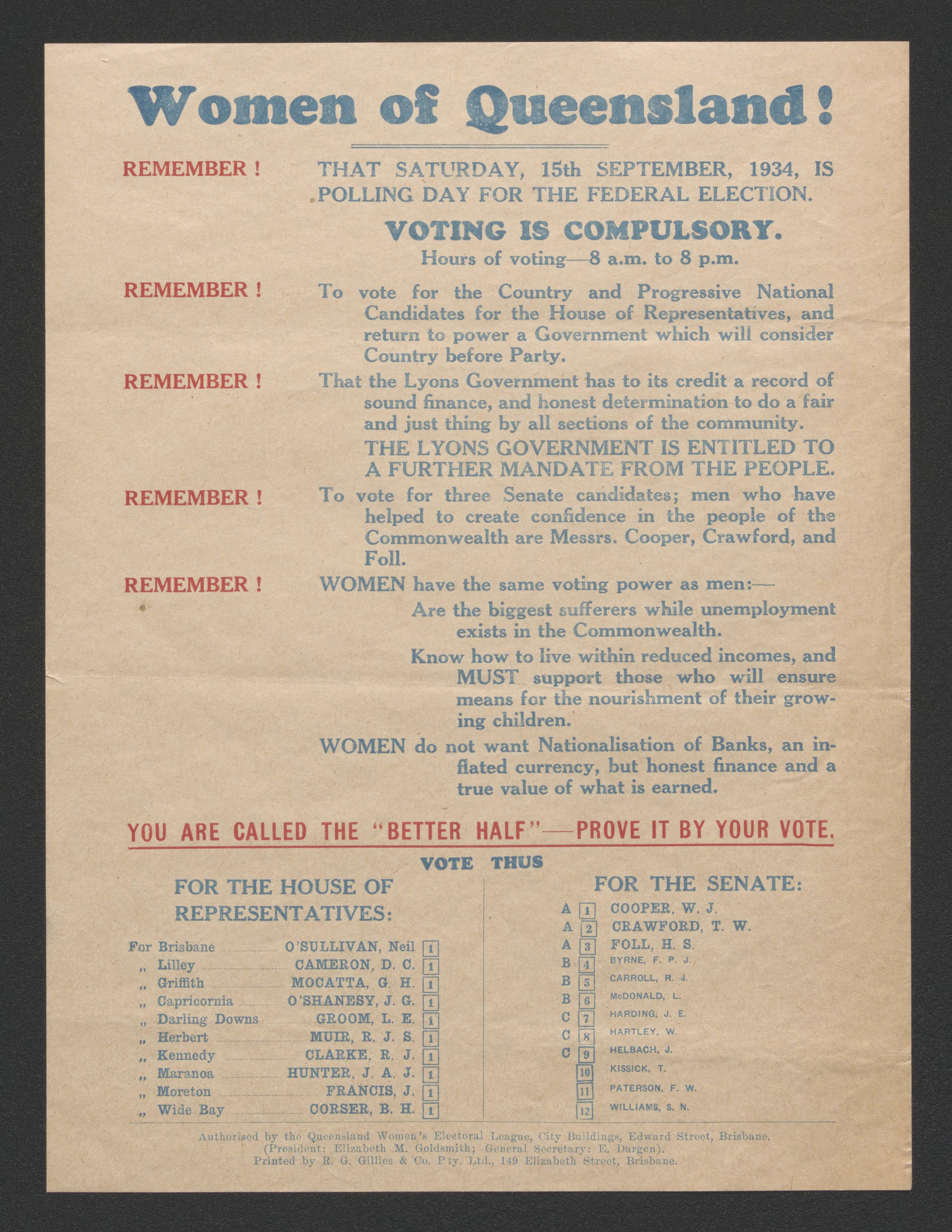
Campaign material used by the party at the 1934 federal election, targeting female voters

The party was formed on 12 May 1925 as the result of a merger between the state's two conservative parties, the United Party (the Queensland branch of the Nationalist Party) and the Country Party, in an attempt to end a decade of Labor domination in the state. Initially called the Country Progressive Party it was formed by all of the Country MLAs and all but four United MLAs; the outstanding four joined in December when the party took the name Country and Progressive National Party. The party was led throughout the entirety of its existence by Arthur Edward Moore, previously the leader of the Country Party. In the 1929 state election the party won power, defeating Labor in a landslide. The election was further notable for the surprise victory of Irene Longman, a Country and Progressive National candidate and the first woman ever to be elected to the Queensland parliament. However, the government floundered amidst the difficulties of the Great Depression, and was swept from power in 1932 by the Labor Party, led by William Forgan Smith. It contested the 1935 state election, but was severely beaten, being reduced to sixteen seats, which left Labor with a massive majority. As a result, in 1936, the party again split, leaving two state-based parties - the Country Party and the United Australia Party, each aligned with the federal parties of the same names. The two parties continued in a coalition, with the Country Party as senior partner.

From 1941-1944 another merger was attempted via the Country-National Organisation but this failed within a few years.

A later merger between the two parties' successors, the Liberal and National parties, gave birth to the Liberal National Party of Queensland in 2008.

== Election results ==
Election	Leader	Votes	%	Seats	+/–	Position	Government
1926	Arthur Edward Moore	192,043	48.48	28 / 72	▼1	2nd	Opposition
1929	Arthur Edward Moore	233,977	54.23	43 / 72	▲15	▲1st	Majority government
1932	Arthur Edward Moore	204,158	45.21	28 / 62	▼15	▼2nd	Opposition
1935	Arthur Edward Moore	156,325	33.80	16 / 62	▼12	2nd	Opposition

== See also ==
- Liberal National Party
