= Results of the 1915 Queensland state election =

Queensland state election results

Queensland state election, 22 May 1915 Legislative Assembly << 1912–1918 >>
Enrolled voters	302,061^{[1]}				
Votes cast	266,240		Turnout	88.14	+12.62
Informal votes	4,188		Informal	1.57	+0.38
Summary of votes by party
Party	Primary votes	%	Swing	Seats	Change
Labor	136,419	52.06	+5.36	45	+20
Liberals	109,985	41.97	–4.73	21	–25
Farmers' Union	13,233	5.05	+5.05	5	+ 5
Independent	2,415	0.92	–0.82	1	± 0
Total	262,052			72	

This is a list of electoral district results for the 1915 Queensland state election.

At the time, the voting system in Queensland was based on contingency voting, which was similar to the modern optional preferential voting system. In electorates with 3 or more candidates, preferences were not distributed if a candidate received more than 50% of the primary vote.

If none received more than 50%, all except the top two candidates were eliminated from the count and their preferences distributed between the two leaders, with the one receiving the most votes declared the winner.

== Results by electoral district ==
=== Albert ===
1915 Queensland state election: Albert
Party	Candidate	Votes	%	±%
Farmers' Union	John Appel	unopposed		
Farmers' Union gain from Liberal		Swing	N/A	

=== Aubigny ===
1915 Queensland state election: Aubigny
Party	Candidate	Votes	%	±%
Farmers' Union	Arthur Edward Moore	1,453	40.3	+40.3
Labor	Jack Jones	1,016	28.2	−2.6
Liberal	Alfred Luke	990	27.4	−41.8
Independent	Francis Mitchell	149	4.1	+4.1
Total formal votes		3,608	96.5	−2.1
Informal votes		93	3.5	+2.1
Turnout		3,701	88.3	+16.4
Two-candidate-preferred result
Farmers' Union	Arthur Edward Moore	1,747	62.7	+62.7
Labor	Jack Jones	1,039	37.3	+6.5
Farmers' Union gain from Liberal		Swing	N/A	

=== Balonne ===
1915 Queensland state election: Balonne
Party	Candidate	Votes	%	±%
Labor	Edward Land	unopposed		
Labor hold		Swing		

=== Barcoo ===
1915 Queensland state election: Barcoo
Party	Candidate	Votes	%	±%
Labor	T.J. Ryan	1,962	77.4	+5.1
Liberal	Charles Webster	573	22.6	−5.1
Total formal votes		2,535	97.3	−1.1
Informal votes		69	2.7	+1.1
Turnout		2,604	72.3	+7.0
Labor hold		Swing	+5.1	

=== Bowen ===
1915 Queensland state election: Bowen
Party	Candidate	Votes	%	±%
Labor	Charles Collins	2,416	57.5	+12.6
Liberal	Edwin Caine	1,787	42.5	−12.6
Total formal votes		4,203	97.7	−1.1
Informal votes		100	2.3	+1.1
Turnout		4,303	79.8	+3.4
Labor gain from Liberal		Swing	+12.6	

=== Bremer ===
1915 Queensland state election: Bremer
Party	Candidate	Votes	%	±%
Labor	Frank Cooper	3,157	61.5	+11.7
Liberal	Felix Barbat	1,974	38.5	−11.7
Total formal votes		5,131	98.9	−0.1
Informal votes		55	1.1	+0.1
Turnout		5,186	94.0	+12.4
Labor gain from Liberal		Swing	+11.7	

=== Brisbane ===
1915 Queensland state election: Brisbane
Party	Candidate	Votes	%	±%
Labor	Mick Kirwan	2,529	60.8	+10.4
Liberal	Charles Jenkinson	1,632	39.2	−10.4
Total formal votes		4,161	97.2	−1.7
Informal votes		118	2.8	+1.7
Turnout		4,279	82.4	+9.1
Labor hold		Swing	+10.4	

=== Bulimba ===
1915 Queensland state election: Bulimba
Party	Candidate	Votes	%	±%
Labor	Hugh McMinn	3,774	51.6	+8.5
Liberal	Walter Barnes	3,536	48.4	−8.5
Total formal votes		7,310	98.5	−0.9
Informal votes		109	1.5	+0.9
Turnout		7,419	93.4	+7.7
Labor gain from Liberal		Swing	+8.5	

=== Bundaberg ===
1915 Queensland state election: Bundaberg
Party	Candidate	Votes	%	±%
Labor	George Barber	2,920	69.0	+13.3
Liberal	Lancelot Wilkinson	1,311	31.0	−13.3
Total formal votes		4,231	98.6	−0.8
Informal votes		61	1.4	+0.8
Turnout		4,292	88.8	+5.6
Labor hold		Swing	+13.3	

=== Buranda ===
1915 Queensland state election: Buranda
Party	Candidate	Votes	%	±%
Labor	John Huxham	3,177	65.2	+9.7
Liberal	Joseph Allen	1,697	34.8	−9.7
Total formal votes		4,874	97.9	−1.4
Informal votes		104	2.1	+1.4
Turnout		4,978	92.2	+4.7
Labor hold		Swing	+9.7	

=== Burke ===
1915 Queensland state election: Burke
Party	Candidate	Votes	%	±%
Independent	William Murphy	828	51.8	−1.7
Labor	David Swiss-Davies	771	48.2	+1.7
Total formal votes		1,599	96.0	−3.0
Informal votes		66	4.0	+3.0
Turnout		1,665	81.3	+10.6
Independent hold		Swing	−1.7	

=== Burnett ===
1915 Queensland state election: Burnett
Party	Candidate	Votes	%	±%
Liberal	Bernard Corser	2,296	56.1	+3.0
Labor	Albert Mack	1,793	43.9	−3.0
Total formal votes		4,089	99.1	+0.8
Informal votes		38	0.9	−0.8
Turnout		4,127	89.0	+11.0
Liberal hold		Swing	+3.0	

=== Burrum ===
1915 Queensland state election: Burrum
Party	Candidate	Votes	%	±%
Liberal	Colin Rankin	1,993	53.4	−5.0
Labor	Albert Whitford	1,741	46.6	+5.0
Total formal votes		3,734	98.8	−0.3
Informal votes		46	1.2	+0.3
Turnout		3,780	90.4	+19.1
Liberal hold		Swing	−5.0	

=== Cairns ===
1915 Queensland state election: Cairns
Party	Candidate	Votes	%	±%
Labor	William McCormack	2,797	70.4	+19.1
Liberal	Neal Macrossan	1,177	29.6	+29.6
Total formal votes		3,974	99.3	+0.6
Informal votes		28	0.7	−0.6
Turnout		4,002	87.8	+26.2
Labor hold		Swing	N/A	

=== Carnarvon ===
1915 Queensland state election: Carnarvon
Party	Candidate	Votes	%	±%
Liberal	Donald Gunn	1,790	51.0	−4.6
Labor	George Boyden	1,722	49.0	+4.6
Total formal votes		3,512	98.6	−0.8
Informal votes		48	1.4	+0.8
Turnout		3,560	87.6	+9.7
Liberal hold		Swing	−4.6	

=== Charters Towers ===
1915 Queensland state election: Charters Towers
Party	Candidate	Votes	%	±%
Labor	William Wellington	1,663	58.3	+11.6
Liberal	Robert Williams	1,192	41.7	−11.6
Total formal votes		2,855	96.9	−1.7
Informal votes		90	3.1	+1.7
Turnout		2,945	90.3	+7.4
Labor gain from Liberal		Swing	+11.6	

=== Chillagoe ===
1915 Queensland state election: Chillagoe
Party	Candidate	Votes	%	±%
Labor	Ted Theodore	1,288	79.7	+4.6
Liberal	Edward Steele	328	20.3	−4.6
Total formal votes		1,616	97.1	−0.3
Informal votes		49	2.9	+0.3
Turnout		1,665	79.6	+9.7
Labor hold		Swing	+4.6	

=== Cook ===
1915 Queensland state election: Cook
Party	Candidate	Votes	%	±%
Labor	Henry Ryan	1,407	53.9	+12.2
Liberal	Henry Douglas	1,203	46.1	−12.2
Total formal votes		2,610	98.1	−1.0
Informal votes		50	1.9	+1.0
Turnout		2,660	85.2	+8.3
Labor gain from Liberal		Swing	+12.2	

=== Cooroora ===
1915 Queensland state election: Cooroora
Party	Candidate	Votes	%	±%
Liberal	Harry Walker	2,559	60.6	−3.9
Labor	Daniel O'Brien	1,664	39.4	+3.9
Total formal votes		4,223	98.6	−0.5
Informal votes		58	1.4	+0.5
Turnout		4,281	87.5	+12.5
Liberal hold		Swing	−3.9	

=== Cunningham ===
1915 Queensland state election: Cunningham
Party	Candidate	Votes	%	±%
Liberal	Francis Grayson	unopposed		
Liberal hold		Swing		

=== Dalby ===
1915 Queensland state election: Dalby
Party	Candidate	Votes	%	±%
Labor	John Connolly	1,788	42.5	−0.4
Liberal	William Vowles	1,414	33.6	−23.5
Farmers' Union	Frederick Bradhurst	1,004	23.9	+23.9
Total formal votes		4,206	97.9	−1.6
Informal votes		89	2.1	+1.6
Turnout		4,295	84.5	+9.1
Two-party-preferred result
Liberal	William Vowles	2,165	53.2	−3.9
Labor	John Connolly	1,902	46.8	+3.9
Liberal hold		Swing	−3.9	

=== Drayton ===
1915 Queensland state election: Drayton
Party	Candidate	Votes	%	±%
Farmers' Union	William Bebbington	2,473	65.9	+65.9
Labor	Jacob Donges	1,278	34.1	+1.1
Total formal votes		3,751	97.9	−0.9
Informal votes		82	2.1	+0.9
Turnout		3,833	87.6	+11.8
Farmers' Union gain from Liberal		Swing	N/A	

=== Eacham ===
1915 Queensland state election: Eacham
Party	Candidate	Votes	%	±%
Labor	William Gillies	2,095	66.5	+14.1
Liberal	Edward Heales	1,054	33.5	−14.1
Total formal votes		3,149	97.2	−1.2
Informal votes		91	2.8	+1.2
Turnout		3,240	87.0	+10.1
Labor hold		Swing	+14.1	

=== East Toowoomba ===
1915 Queensland state election: East Toowoomba
Party	Candidate	Votes	%	±%
Liberal	Robert Roberts	2,378	55.2	−0.5
Labor	Thomas Lonsdale	1,931	44.8	+0.5
Total formal votes		4,309	99.1	−0.2
Informal votes		37	0.9	+0.2
Turnout		4,346	87.0	+12.5
Liberal hold		Swing	−0.5	

=== Enoggera ===
1915 Queensland state election: Enoggera
Party	Candidate	Votes	%	±%
Labor	William Lloyd	2,944	56.4	+9.8
Liberal	Richard Trout	2,278	43.6	−9.8
Total formal votes		5,222	98.9	−0.7
Informal votes		57	1.1	+0.7
Turnout		5,279	93.0	+6.0
Labor gain from Liberal		Swing	+9.8	

=== Fassifern ===
1915 Queensland state election: Fassifern
Party	Candidate	Votes	%	±%
Liberal	Ernest Bell	1,976	47.8	−52.2
Farmers' Union	Eaton Winks	1,205	29.2	+29.2
Labor	Bill Heffernan	951	23.0	+23.0
Total formal votes		4,132	98.0	
Informal votes		85	2.0	
Turnout		4,217	92.1	
Two-candidate-preferred result
Liberal	Ernest Bell	2,007	60.5	−39.5
Farmers' Union	Eaton Winks	1,310	39.5	+39.5
Liberal hold		Swing	N/A	

=== Fitzroy ===
1915 Queensland state election: Fitzroy
Party	Candidate	Votes	%	±%
Labor	Harry Hartley	2,403	51.1	+9.9
Liberal	Kenneth Grant	2,298	48.9	−9.9
Total formal votes		4,701	98.1	+1.1
Informal votes		93	1.9	−1.1
Turnout		4,794	85.1	+11.1
Labor gain from Liberal		Swing	+9.9	

=== Flinders ===
1915 Queensland state election: Flinders
Party	Candidate	Votes	%	±%
Labor	John May	unopposed		
Labor hold		Swing		

=== Fortitude Valley ===
1915 Queensland state election: Fortitude Valley
Party	Candidate	Votes	%	±%
Labor	David Bowman	2,947	68.2	+8.2
Liberal	John Best	1,374	31.8	−8.2
Total formal votes		4,321	98.6	−0.6
Informal votes		61	1.4	+0.6
Turnout		4,382	90.3	+6.7
Labor hold		Swing	+8.2	

==== By-election ====
- This by-election was caused by the death of David Bowman and was held on 1 April 1916.

1916 Fortitude Valley state by-election
Party	Candidate	Votes	%	±%
Labor	Thomas Wilson	2,821	63.7	−4.5
Liberal	George Down	1,606	36.3	+4.5
Total formal votes		4,427	99.0	+0.4
Informal votes		45	1.0	−0.4
Turnout		4,472	84.6	−5.7
Labor hold		Swing	−4.5	

=== Gregory ===
1915 Queensland state election: Gregory
Party	Candidate	Votes	%	±%
Labor	William Hamilton	unopposed		
Labor hold		Swing		

==== By-election ====
- This by-election was caused by the appointment of William Hamilton to the Legislative Council and was held on 4 September 1915.

1915 Gregory state by-election
Party	Candidate	Votes	%	±%
Labor	George Pollock	unopposed		
Labor hold		Swing		

=== Gympie ===
1915 Queensland state election: Gympie
Party	Candidate	Votes	%	±%
Labor	Thomas Dunstan	1,874	52.7	+10.6
Liberal	George Mackay	1,683	47.3	+1.6
Total formal votes		3,557	98.5	−0.2
Informal votes		53	1.5	+0.2
Turnout		3,610	92.7	+12.6
Labor gain from Liberal		Swing	+5.4	

=== Herbert ===
1915 Queensland state election: Herbert
Party	Candidate	Votes	%	±%
Labor	William Lennon	1,864	64.6	+7.9
Liberal	Ralph Johnson	1,023	35.4	−7.9
Total formal votes		2,887	97.7	−1.7
Informal votes		69	2.3	+1.7
Turnout		2,956	80.7	+13.4
Labor hold		Swing	+7.9	

=== Ipswich ===
1915 Queensland state election: Ipswich
Party	Candidate	Votes	%	±%
Labor	David Gledson	2,706	53.4	+6.5
Liberal	James Blair	2,360	46.6	−6.5
Total formal votes		5,066	98.9	−0.2
Informal votes		54	1.1	+0.2
Turnout		5,120	92.0	+14.8
Labor gain from Liberal		Swing	+6.5	

=== Ithaca ===
1915 Queensland state election: Ithaca
Party	Candidate	Votes	%	±%
Labor	John Gilday	3,095	63.7	+8.5
Liberal	Benjamin Harding	1,763	36.3	−8.5
Total formal votes		4,858	98.7	−0.6
Informal votes		66	1.3	+0.6
Turnout		4,924	90.8	+3.7
Labor hold		Swing	+8.5	

=== Kennedy ===
1915 Queensland state election: Kennedy
Party	Candidate	Votes	%	±%
Labor	James O'Sullivan	1,594	67.8	+10.3
Liberal	John Houghton	756	32.2	−10.3
Total formal votes		2,350	96.9	−0.9
Informal votes		76	3.1	+0.9
Turnout		2,426	82.9	+8.3
Labor hold		Swing	+10.3	

=== Keppel ===
1915 Queensland state election: Keppel
Party	Candidate	Votes	%	±%
Labor	James Larcombe	2,169	67.4	+17.4
Liberal	Leopold Landsberg	1,050	32.6	−11.7
Total formal votes		3,219	98.5	+0.3
Informal votes		50	1.5	−0.3
Turnout		3,269	86.8	+12.2
Labor hold		Swing	+15.0	

=== Kurilpa ===
1915 Queensland state election: Kurilpa
Party	Candidate	Votes	%	±%
Labor	William Hartley	2,610	54.1	+9.6
Liberal	James Allan	2,211	45.9	−9.6
Total formal votes		4,821	99.4	0.0
Informal votes		31	0.6	0.0
Turnout		4,852	91.3	+7.7
Labor gain from Liberal		Swing	+9.6	

=== Leichhardt ===
1915 Queensland state election: Leichhardt
Party	Candidate	Votes	%	±%
Labor	Herbert Hardacre	unopposed		
Labor hold		Swing		

=== Lockyer ===
1915 Queensland state election: Lockyer
Party	Candidate	Votes	%	±%
Liberal	William Drayton Armstrong	1,525	51.7	−48.3
Farmers' Union	William McIllwraith	926	31.4	+31.4
Labor	Charles Bromley	499	16.9	+16.9
Total formal votes		2,950	98.3	
Informal votes		51	1.7	
Turnout		3,001	89.6	
Liberal hold		Swing	N/A	

=== Logan ===
1915 Queensland state election: Logan
Party	Candidate	Votes	%	±%
Liberal	James Stodart	2,481	56.1	−12.6
Labor	Percy Crooke	1,941	43.9	+12.6
Total formal votes		4,422	99.1	+0.2
Informal votes		41	0.9	−0.2
Turnout		4,463	89.6	+12.0
Liberal hold		Swing	−12.6	

=== Mackay ===
1915 Queensland state election: Mackay
Party	Candidate	Votes	%	±%
Labor	William Forgan Smith	2,226	54.4	+16.5
Liberal	George Johnson	1,864	45.6	−16.5
Total formal votes		4,090	98.6	+2.5
Informal votes		60	1.4	−2.5
Turnout		4,150	80.4	+10.9
Labor gain from Liberal		Swing	+16.5	

=== Maranoa ===
1915 Queensland state election: Maranoa
Party	Candidate	Votes	%	±%
Labor	John Hunter	2,554	69.0	+6.6
Liberal	Francis Dyer	1,148	31.0	−6.6
Total formal votes		3,702	98.5	−0.6
Informal votes		55	1.5	+0.6
Turnout		3,757	83.2	+12.8
Labor hold		Swing	+6.6	

=== Maree ===
1915 Queensland state election: Maree
Party	Candidate	Votes	%	±%
Labor	William Bertram	2,936	60.2	+9.0
Liberal	John Walsh	1,942	39.8	−9.0
Total formal votes		4,878	98.6	−0.1
Informal votes		70	1.4	+0.1
Turnout		4,948	92.8	+8.6
Labor hold		Swing	+9.0	

=== Maryborough ===
1915 Queensland state election: Maryborough
Party	Candidate	Votes	%	±%
Labor	Alfred Jones	2,398	55.7	+5.8
Liberal	Edward Corser	1,904	44.3	−5.8
Total formal votes		4,302	99.0	+0.4
Informal votes		44	1.0	−0.4
Turnout		4,346	92.3	+13.3
Labor gain from Liberal		Swing	+5.8	

==== By-election ====
- This by-election was caused by the appointment of Alfred Jones to the Legislative Council, and was held on 31 March 1917.

1917 Maryborough state by-election
Party	Candidate	Votes	%	±%
Labor	David Weir	2,312	57.7	+2.0
National	George Harding	1,693	42.3	−2.0
Total formal votes		4,005	99.7	+0.7
Informal votes		11	0.3	−0.7
Turnout		4,016		
Labor hold		Swing	+2.0	

=== Merthyr ===
1915 Queensland state election: Merthyr
Party	Candidate	Votes	%	±%
Labor	Peter McLachlan	2,881	57.3	+7.4
Liberal	John Lackey	2,144	42.7	−7.4
Total formal votes		5,025	99.4	+0.5
Informal votes		29	0.6	−0.5
Turnout		5,054	91.7	+6.2
Labor gain from Liberal		Swing	+7.4	

=== Mirani ===
1915 Queensland state election: Mirani
Party	Candidate	Votes	%	±%
Liberal	Edward Swayne	1,569	49.9	−18.9
Labor	John Binstead	1,337	43.8	+12.6
Farmers' Union	Henry Turner	201	6.4	+6.4
Total formal votes		3,147	96.6	−2.0
Informal votes		110	3.4	+2.0
Turnout		3,257	85.3	+21.4
Two-party-preferred result
Liberal	Edward Swayne	1,579	52.6	−16.2
Labor	John Binstead	1,420	47.4	+16.2
Liberal hold		Swing	−16.2	

=== Mitchell ===
1915 Queensland state election: Mitchell
Party	Candidate	Votes	%	±%
Labor	John Payne	unopposed		
Labor hold		Swing		

=== Mount Morgan ===
1915 Queensland state election: Mount Morgan
Party	Candidate	Votes	%	±%
Labor	James Stopford	2,461	66.2	+19.2
Liberal	James Crawford	790	21.3	−31.7
Independent	Frederick McCarthy	465	12.5	+12.5
Total formal votes		3,716	98.0	−1.5
Informal votes		74	2.0	+1.5
Turnout		3,790	91.3	+13.6
Labor gain from Liberal		Swing	N/A	

=== Mundingburra ===
1915 Queensland state election: Mundingburra
Party	Candidate	Votes	%	±%
Labor	Thomas Foley	2,959	70.2	+8.5
Liberal	Thomas Page	1,255	29.8	−8.5
Total formal votes		4,214	97.1	−1.8
Informal votes		125	2.9	+1.8
Turnout		4,339	83.3	+7.0
Labor hold		Swing	+8.5	

=== Murilla ===
1915 Queensland state election: Murilla
Party	Candidate	Votes	%	±%
Liberal	Godfrey Morgan	2,236	54.2	−2.0
Labor	Joseph Collings	1,892	45.8	+2.0
Total formal votes		4,128	98.0	+0.4
Informal votes		85	2.0	−0.4
Turnout		4,213	84.4	+11.6
Liberal hold		Swing	−2.0	

=== Murrumba ===
1915 Queensland state election: Murrumba
Party	Candidate	Votes	%	±%
Liberal	James Forsyth	3,099	64.9	−12.3
Labor	Arthur Sampson	1,677	35.1	+12.3
Total formal votes		4,779	98.8	−0.3
Informal votes		59	1.2	+0.3
Turnout		4,835	91.1	+20.0
Liberal hold		Swing	−12.3	

=== Musgrave ===
1915 Queensland state election: Musgrave
Party	Candidate	Votes	%	±%
Labor	Thomas Armfield	1,696	53.5	+10.4
Liberal	John White	1,476	46.5	−10.4
Total formal votes		3,172	98.8	+0.3
Informal votes		37	1.2	−0.3
Turnout		3,209	90.0	+11.7
Labor gain from Liberal		Swing	+10.4	

=== Nanango ===
1915 Queensland state election: Nanango
Party	Candidate	Votes	%	±%
Farmers' Union	Robert Hodge	3,167	55.8	+55.8
Labor	Thomas Armstrong	2,509	44.2	+8.0
Total formal votes		5,676	98.7	0.0
Informal votes		75	1.3	0.0
Turnout		5,751	86.7	+17.2
Farmers' Union gain from Liberal		Swing	N/A	

=== Normanby ===
1915 Queensland state election: Normanby
Party	Candidate	Votes	%	±%
Labor	Jens Peterson	1,847	56.5	+17.2
Liberal	Edward Archer	1,424	43.5	−17.2
Total formal votes		3,271	97.6	+0.3
Informal votes		81	2.4	−0.3
Turnout		3,352	85.1	+16.8
Labor gain from Liberal		Swing	+17.2	

=== Nundah ===
1915 Queensland state election: Nundah
Party	Candidate	Votes	%	±%
Liberal	Thomas Bridges	2,830	51.7	−13.4
Labor	Richard Sumner	2,640	48.3	+13.4
Total formal votes		5,470	99.0	−0.5
Informal votes		57	1.0	+0.5
Turnout		5,527	88.9	+9.0
Liberal hold		Swing	−13.4	

=== Oxley ===
1915 Queensland state election: Oxley
Party	Candidate	Votes	%	±%
Labor	Thomas Jones	3,028	51.2	+9.5
Liberal	Digby Denham	2,885	48.8	−9.5
Total formal votes		5,913	99.1	−0.4
Informal votes		53	0.9	+0.4
Turnout		5,966	92.7	+7.1
Labor gain from Liberal		Swing	+8.5	

=== Paddington ===
1915 Queensland state election: Paddington
Party	Candidate	Votes	%	±%
Labor	John Fihelly	3,269	68.4	+10.8
Liberal	George Sweetman	1,509	31.6	−10.8
Total formal votes		4,778	97.9	−0.9
Informal votes		102	2.1	+0.9
Turnout		4,880	87.4	+2.8
Labor hold		Swing	+10.8	

=== Pittsworth ===
1915 Queensland state election: Pittsworth
Party	Candidate	Votes	%	±%
Farmers' Union	Percy Bayley	1,467	41.3	+41.3
Labor	William Hayes	1,089	30.7	−8.7
Liberal	Donald Mackintosh	997	28.1	−32.5
Total formal votes		3,553	98.9	−0.7
Informal votes		41	1.1	+0.7
Turnout		3,594	88.7	+15.5
Two-candidate-preferred result
Farmers' Union	Percy Bayley	1,727	59.5	+59.5
Labor	William Hayes	1,176	40.5	+1.1
Farmers' Union gain from Liberal		Swing	N/A	

=== Port Curtis ===
1915 Queensland state election: Port Curtis
Party	Candidate	Votes	%	±%
Labor	George Carter	1,881	50.7	+0.7
Liberal	John Kessell	1,828	49.3	−0.7
Total formal votes		3,709	99.5	+0.7
Informal votes		20	0.5	−0.7
Turnout		3,729	90.7	+12.3
Labor gain from Liberal		Swing	+0.7	

=== Queenton ===
1915 Queensland state election: Queenton
Party	Candidate	Votes	%	±%
Labor	Vernon Winstanley	1,888	70.2	+11.6
Liberal	James Bradshaw	803	29.8	−11.6
Total formal votes		2,691	98.2	−1.4
Informal votes		50	1.8	+1.4
Turnout		2,741	88.0	+6.6
Labor hold		Swing	+11.6	

=== Rockhampton ===
1915 Queensland state election: Rockhampton
Party	Candidate	Votes	%	±%
Labor	John Adamson	2,576	66.1	+10.6
Liberal	Thomas Renshaw	1,321	33.9	−10.6
Total formal votes		2,997	98.3	−0.8
Informal votes		68	1.7	+0.8
Turnout		3,065	86.4	+19.4
Labor hold		Swing	+10.6	

==== By-elections ====
- This by-election was caused by the resignation of John Adamson. It was held on 12 May 1917.

1917 Rockhampton state by-election
Party	Candidate	Votes	%	±%
Labor	Frank Forde	2,283	58.3	−7.8
National	Hugh Grant	1,633	41.7	+7.8
Total formal votes		3,916	99.9	+1.6
Informal votes		4	0.1	−1.6
Turnout		3,920		
Labor hold		Swing	−7.8	

=== Rosewood ===
1915 Queensland state election: Rosewood
Party	Candidate	Votes	%	±%
Liberal	Harry Stevens	1,552	41.2	−2.9
Farmers' Union	William Ruhno	1,337	35.5	+35.5
Labor	William Cooper	880	23.4	+1.9
Total formal votes		3,769	96.9	−2.5
Informal votes		122	3.1	+2.5
Turnout		3,891	89.2	+10.1
Two-candidate-preferred result
Liberal	Harry Stevens	1,701	53.7	−4.3
Farmers' Union	William Ruhno	1,0468	46.3	+4.3
Liberal hold		Swing	N/A	

=== South Brisbane ===
1915 Queensland state election: South Brisbane
Party	Candidate	Votes	%	±%
Labor	Edgar Free	2,693	59.4	+9.8
Liberal	John Burke	1,842	40.6	−9.8
Total formal votes		4,535	98.0	−1.3
Informal votes		93	2.0	+1.3
Turnout		4,628	86.6	+9.1
Labor gain from Liberal		Swing	+9.8	

=== Stanley ===
1915 Queensland state election: Stanley
Party	Candidate	Votes	%	±%
Liberal	Henry Somerset	2,212	60.4	−39.6
Labor	John Sherlock	1,448	39.6	+39.6
Total formal votes		3,660	98.7	
Informal votes		47	1.3	
Turnout		3,707	88.0	
Liberal hold		Swing	N/A	

=== Toombul ===
1915 Queensland state election: Toombul
Party	Candidate	Votes	%	±%
Liberal	Andrew Petrie	3,110	56.8	−7.9
Labor	Cuthbert Butler	2,369	43.2	+7.9
Total formal votes		5,479	99.0	−0.4
Informal votes		54	1.0	+0.4
Turnout		5,533	89.0	+6.9
Liberal hold		Swing	−7.9	

=== Toowong ===
1915 Queensland state election: Toowong
Party	Candidate	Votes	%	±%
Liberal	Edward Macartney	3,376	59.6	−10.9
Labor	Arthur Lilley	2,284	40.4	+10.9
Total formal votes		5,660	99.6	−0.2
Informal votes		22	0.4	+0.2
Turnout		5,682	91.7	+10.5
Liberal hold		Swing	−10.9	

=== Toowoomba ===
1915 Queensland state election: Toowoomba
Party	Candidate	Votes	%	±%
Liberal	James Tolmie	2,060	53.3	−6.0
Labor	Michael Alke	1,804	46.7	+6.0
Total formal votes		3,864	98.8	−0.8
Informal votes		45	1.2	+0.8
Turnout		3,909	87.2	+14.4
Liberal hold		Swing	−6.0	

=== Townsville ===
1915 Queensland state election: Townsville
Party	Candidate	Votes	%	±%
Labor	Daniel Ryan	2,318	52.2	+6.5
Liberal	Robert Philp	2,120	47.8	−6.5
Total formal votes		4,438	98.6	+0.3
Informal votes		62	1.4	−0.3
Turnout		4,500	79.5	+6.8
Labor gain from Liberal		Swing	+6.5	

=== Warrego ===
1915 Queensland state election: Warrego
Party	Candidate	Votes	%	±%
Labor	Harry Coyne	unopposed		
Labor hold		Swing		

=== Warwick ===
1915 Queensland state election: Warwick
Party	Candidate	Votes	%	±%
Liberal	George Barnes	1,961	49.3	−10.1
Labor	Paul Bauers	1,043	26.2	−14.4
Independent	Daniel Connolly	973	24.5	+24.5
Total formal votes		3,977	98.8	0.0
Informal votes		49	1.2	0.0
Turnout		4,026	92.3	+22.0
Two-party-preferred result
Liberal	George Barnes	1,989	62.0	+2.6
Labor	Paul Bauers	1,220	38.0	−2.6
Liberal hold		Swing	+2.6	

=== Wide Bay ===
1915 Queensland state election: Wide Bay
Party	Candidate	Votes	%	±%
Liberal	Charles Booker	2,097	51.6	−5.5
Labor	Andrew Thompson	1,967	48.4	+5.5
Total formal votes		4,064	99.2	0.0
Informal votes		34	0.8	0.0
Liberal hold		Swing	−5.5	

=== Windsor ===
1915 Queensland state election: Windsor
Party	Candidate	Votes	%	±%
Labor	Herbert McPhail	3,343	53.0	+10.1
Liberal	Hugh Macrossan	2,969	47.0	−10.1
Total formal votes		6,312	98.5	−0.8
Informal votes		97	1.5	+0.8
Turnout		6,409	91.2	+6.2
Labor gain from Liberal		Swing	+10.1	

== See also ==
- 1915 Queensland state election
- Candidates of the Queensland state election, 1915
- Members of the Queensland Legislative Assembly, 1915-1918
