= Results of the 1918 Queensland state election =

Electoral district results

Queensland state election, 16 March 1918 Legislative Assembly << 1915–1920 >>
Enrolled voters	424,416				
Votes cast	336,647		Turnout	80.27	-7.87
Informal votes	N/A		Informal	1.18	-0.39
Summary of votes by party
Party	Primary votes	%	Swing	Seats	Change
Labor	180,709	53.68	+1.62	48	+3
National	150,225	44.62	+2.65	22	+1
Independent	3,311	0.98	+0.06	2	+1
Total	336,647			72	

This is a list of electoral district results for the 1918 Queensland state election.

At the time, the voting system in Queensland was based on contingency voting, which was similar to the modern optional preferential voting system. In electorates with 3 or more candidates, preferences were not distributed if a candidate received more than 50% of the primary vote.

If none received more than 50%, all except the top two candidates were eliminated from the count and their preferences distributed between the two leaders, with the one receiving the most votes declared the winner.

== Results by electoral district ==
=== Albert ===
1918 Queensland state election: Albert
Party	Candidate	Votes	%	±%
National	John Appel	2,999	62.1	+62.1
Labor	William Lawson	1,832	37.9	+37.9
Total formal votes		4,831	99.1	
Informal votes		43	0.9	
Turnout		4,874	80.4	
National gain from Farmers' Union		Swing	N/A	

- Sitting member John Appel was elected unopposed at the previous election as a Farmers Union candidate. He joined the National QLD 1917 party before this election.

=== Aubigny ===
1918 Queensland state election: Aubigny
Party	Candidate	Votes	%	±%
National	Arthur Edward Moore	2,096	51.7	+24.3
Labor	James Desmond	1,958	48.3	+20.1
Total formal votes		4,054	99.3	+2.8
Informal votes		26	0.7	−2.8
Turnout		4,080	85.2	−3.1
National gain from Farmers' Union		Swing	N/A	

- Sitting member Arthur Edward Moore was elected at the previous election as a Farmers Union candidate. He joined the National QLD 1917 party before this election.

=== Balonne ===
1918 Queensland state election: Balonne
Party	Candidate	Votes	%	±%
Labor	Edward Land	1,720	60.9	−39.1
National	David Roberts	1,104	39.1	+39.1
Total formal votes		2,824	98.8	
Informal votes		35	1.2	
Turnout		2,859	67.6	
Labor hold		Swing	N/A	

=== Barcoo ===
1918 Queensland state election: Barcoo
Party	Candidate	Votes	%	±%
Labor	T. J. Ryan	2,548	73.8	−3.6
National	Henry Buchanan	907	26.2	+3.6
Total formal votes		3,455	98.8	+1.5
Informal votes		43	1.2	−1.5
Turnout		3,498	73.1	+0.8
Labor hold		Swing	−3.6	

==== By-election ====
- This by-election was caused by the resignation of T. J. Ryan to enter Federal politics. It was held on 20 December 1919.

1919 Barcoo state by-election
Party	Candidate	Votes	%	±%
Labor	Frank Bulcock	1,632	74.7	+0.9
Primary Producers	John Boland	552	25.3	+25.3
Total formal votes		2,184	98.8	0.0
Informal votes		26	1.2	0.0
Turnout		2,210		
Labor hold		Swing	+0.9	

=== Bowen ===
1918 Queensland state election: Bowen
Party	Candidate	Votes	%	±%
Labor	Charles Collins	3,046	59.4	+1.9
National	John Mann	2,080	40.6	−1.9
Total formal votes		5,126	99.0	+1.3
Informal votes		53	1.0	−1.3
Turnout		5,179	77.3	−2.5
Labor hold		Swing	+1.9	

=== Bremer ===
1918 Queensland state election: Bremer
Party	Candidate	Votes	%	±%
Labor	Frank Cooper	3,678	66.0	+4.5
National	Edwin Little	1,897	34.0	−4.5
Total formal votes		5,575	98.8	−0.1
Informal votes		65	1.2	+0.1
Turnout		5,640	89.3	−4.7
Labor hold		Swing	+4.5	

=== Brisbane ===
1918 Queensland state election: Brisbane
Party	Candidate	Votes	%	±%
Labor	Mick Kirwan	3,273	60.6	−0.2
National	Norman Warrall	2,126	39.4	+0.2
Total formal votes		5,399	97.9	+0.7
Informal votes		116	2.1	−0.7
Turnout		5,515	61.7	−20.7
Labor hold		Swing	−0.2	

=== Bulimba ===
1918 Queensland state election: Bulimba
Party	Candidate	Votes	%	±%
National	Walter Barnes	5,018	51.3	+2.9
Labor	Hugh McMinn	4,649	47.5	−4.1
Independent	Joseph Marconi	122	1.2	+1.2
Total formal votes		9,789	99.1	+0.6
Informal votes		84	0.9	−0.6
Turnout		9,873	86.8	−6.6
National gain from Labor		Swing	N/A	

=== Bundaberg ===
1918 Queensland state election: Bundaberg
Party	Candidate	Votes	%	±%
Labor	George Barber	3,184	66.5	−2.5
National	William Foster	1,607	33.5	+2.5
Total formal votes		4,785	99.3	+0.7
Informal votes		36	0.7	−0.7
Turnout		4,821	83.0	−5.8
Labor hold		Swing	−2.5	

=== Buranda ===
1918 Queensland state election: Buranda
Party	Candidate	Votes	%	±%
Labor	John Huxham	3,588	60.8	−4.4
National	William Sparkes	2,309	39.2	+4.4
Total formal votes		5,897	99.3	+1.4
Informal votes		42	0.7	−1.4
Turnout		5,939	85.4	−6.8
Labor hold		Swing	−4.4	

=== Burke ===
1918 Queensland state election: Burke
Party	Candidate	Votes	%	±%
Labor	Darby Riordan	886	59.0	+10.8
Independent	William Murphy	617	41.0	−10.8
Total formal votes		1,503	97.4	+1.4
Informal votes		40	2.6	−1.4
Turnout		1,543	73.2	−8.1
Labor gain from Independent		Swing	+10.8	

=== Burnett ===
1918 Queensland state election: Burnett
Party	Candidate	Votes	%	±%
National	Bernard Corser	2,642	58.6	+2.5
Labor	Joseph Warmington	1,865	41.4	−2.5
Total formal votes		4,507	99.3	+0.2
Informal votes		31	0.7	−0.2
Turnout		4,538	83.0	−6.0
National hold		Swing	+2.5	

=== Burrum ===
1918 Queensland state election: Burrum
Party	Candidate	Votes	%	±%
Labor	Albert Whitford	2,060	51.6	+5.0
National	Colin Rankin	1,936	48.4	−5.0
Total formal votes		3,996	97.6	−1.2
Informal votes		100	2.4	+1.2
Turnout		4,096	84.0	−6.4
Labor gain from National		Swing	+5.0	

=== Cairns ===
1918 Queensland state election: Cairns
Party	Candidate	Votes	%	±%
Labor	William McCormack	3,296	61.4	−9.0
National	William Griffin	2,075	38.6	+9.0
Total formal votes		5,371	98.4	−0.9
Informal votes		88	1.6	+0.9
Turnout		5,459	76.2	−11.6
Labor hold		Swing	−9.0	

=== Carnarvon ===
1918 Queensland state election: Carnarvon
Party	Candidate	Votes	%	±%
National	Donald Gunn	2,186	52.2	+1.2
Labor	Randolph Bedford	1,998	47.8	−1.2
Total formal votes		4,184	99.5	+0.9
Informal votes		20	0.5	−0.9
Turnout		4,204	83.3	−4.3
National hold		Swing	+1.2	

=== Charters Towers ===
1918 Queensland state election: Charters Towers
Party	Candidate	Votes	%	±%
Labor	William Wellington	1,583	56.7	−1.6
National	Robert Wynn Williams	1,209	43.3	+1.6
Total formal votes		2,792	97.8	+0.9
Informal votes		64	2.2	−0.9
Turnout		2,856	79.4	−10.9
Labor hold		Swing	−1.6	

=== Chillagoe ===
1918 Queensland state election: Chillagoe
Party	Candidate	Votes	%	±%
Labor	Ted Theodore	1,018	72.8	−6.9
National	William Worley	380	27.2	+6.9
Total formal votes		1,398	98.7	+1.6
Informal votes		19	1.3	−1.6
Turnout		1,417	78.5	−1.1
Labor hold		Swing	−6.9	

=== Cook ===
1918 Queensland state election: Cook
Party	Candidate	Votes	%	±%
Labor	Henry Ryan	1,621	60.6	+6.7
National	Walter Anderson	1,054	39.4	−6.7
Total formal votes		2,675	96.7	−1.4
Informal votes		90	3.3	+1.4
Turnout		2,765	74.1	−11.1
Labor hold		Swing	+6.7	

=== Cooroora ===
1918 Queensland state election: Cooroora
Party	Candidate	Votes	%	±%
National	Harry Walker	3,213	64.5	+3.9
Labor	Hector Spratt	1,766	35.5	−3.9
Total formal votes		4,979	98.9	+0.3
Informal votes		53	1.1	−0.3
Turnout		5,032	80.9	−6.6
National hold		Swing	+3.9	

=== Cunningham ===
1918 Queensland state election: Cunningham
Party	Candidate	Votes	%	±%
Independent National QLD 1917	Francis Grayson	1,713	45.9	+45.9
Labor	John Moir	1,355	36.3	+36.3
National	James Purcell	662	17.7	−82.3
Total formal votes		3,730	97.6	
Informal votes		93	2.4	
Turnout		3,823	81.1	
Independent National QLD 1917 gain from National		Swing	N/A	

=== Dalby ===
1918 Queensland state election: Dalby
Party	Candidate	Votes	%	±%
National	William Vowles	2,686	56.9	+23.3
Labor	Austin McKeon	2,033	43.1	+0.6
Total formal votes		4,719	99.4	+1.5
Informal votes		28	0.6	−1.5
Turnout		4,747	79.8	−4.7
National hold		Swing	+3.7	

=== Drayton ===
1918 Queensland state election: Drayton
Party	Candidate	Votes	%	±%
National	William Bebbington	2,164	52.7	+52.7
Labor	Michael Alke	1,940	47.3	+13.2
Total formal votes		4,104	99.1	+1.2
Informal votes		37	0.9	−1.2
Turnout		4,141	84.2	−3.4
National gain from Farmers' Union		Swing	N/A	

- Sitting member William Bebbington was elected at the previous election as a Farmers Union candidate. He joined the National QLD 1917 party before this election.

=== Eacham ===
1918 Queensland state election: Eacham
Party	Candidate	Votes	%	±%
Labor	William Gillies	2,041	54.8	−11.7
National	William Sloan	1,682	45.2	+11.7
Total formal votes		3,723	98.7	+1.5
Informal votes		47	1.3	−1.5
Turnout		3,770	80.2	−6.8
Labor hold		Swing	−11.7	

=== East Toowoomba ===
1918 Queensland state election: East Toowoomba
Party	Candidate	Votes	%	±%
National	Robert Roberts	2,511	51.4	−3.8
Labor	James MacDougall	2,370	48.6	+3.8
Total formal votes		4,881	98.6	−0.5
Informal votes		70	1.4	+0.5
Turnout		4,951	81.8	−5.2
National hold		Swing	−3.8	

=== Enoggera ===
1918 Queensland state election: Enoggera
Party	Candidate	Votes	%	±%
Labor	William Lloyd	3,355	50.8	−5.6
National	William Wright	3,252	49.2	+5.6
Total formal votes		6,607	98.5	−0.4
Informal votes		99	1.5	+0.4
Turnout		6,706	84.4	−8.6
Labor hold		Swing	−5.6	

=== Fassifern ===
1918 Queensland state election: Fassifern
Party	Candidate	Votes	%	±%
National	Ernest Bell	2,420	53.3	+5.5
Labor	Joseph Sweeney	2,121	46.7	+23.7
Total formal votes		4,541	99.2	+1.2
Informal votes		35	0.8	−1.2
Turnout		4,576	88.6	−3.5
National hold		Swing	−7.2	

=== Fitzroy ===
1918 Queensland state election: Fitzroy
Party	Candidate	Votes	%	±%
Labor	Harry Hartley	3,158	54.0	+2.9
National	Kenneth Grant	2,691	46.0	−2.9
Total formal votes		5,849	98.2	+0.1
Informal votes		106	1.8	−0.1
Turnout		5,955	83.0	−2.1
Labor hold		Swing	+2.9	

=== Flinders ===
1918 Queensland state election: Flinders
Party	Candidate	Votes	%	±%
Labor	John Mullan	3,171	75.7	−24.3
National	William Little	1,019	24.3	+24.3
Total formal votes		4,190	98.2	
Informal votes		78	1.8	
Turnout		4,268	59.1	
Labor hold		Swing	N/A	

=== Fortitude Valley ===
1918 Queensland state election: Fortitude Valley
Party	Candidate	Votes	%	±%
Labor	Thomas Wilson	3,361	65.5	−2.7
National	Bernard Revenall-Holland	1,770	34.5	+2.7
Total formal votes		5,131	99.4	+0.8
Informal votes		31	0.6	−0.8
Turnout		5,162	82.4	−7.9
Labor hold		Swing	−2.7	

=== Gregory ===
1918 Queensland state election: Gregory
Party	Candidate	Votes	%	±%
Labor	George Pollock	2,593	70.5	−29.5
National	Eric Anning	1,084	29.5	+29.5
Total formal votes		3,677	97.2	
Informal votes		104	2.8	
Turnout		3,781	57.3	
Labor hold		Swing	N/A	

=== Gympie ===
1918 Queensland state election: Gympie
Party	Candidate	Votes	%	±%
Labor	Thomas Dunstan	2,076	56.7	+4.0
National	Alexander Glasgow	1,585	43.3	−4.0
Total formal votes		3,661	99.0	+0.5
Informal votes		36	1.0	−0.5
Turnout		3,697	87.2	−5.5
Labor hold		Swing	+4.0	

=== Herbert ===
1918 Queensland state election: Herbert
Party	Candidate	Votes	%	±%
Labor	William Lennon	2,304	63.4	−1.2
National	Ralph Johnson	1,333	36.6	+1.2
Total formal votes		3,637	98.1	+0.4
Informal votes		71	1.9	−0.4
Turnout		3,708	69.3	−11.4
Labor hold		Swing	−1.2	

==== By-election ====
- This by-election was caused by the appointment of William Lennon as Lieutenant Governor of Queensland. It was held on 10 April 1920.

1920 Herbert state by-election
Party	Candidate	Votes	%	±%
Labor	Percy Pease	2,134	50.6	−12.8
National	Hedley Gelston	2,087	49.4	+12.8
Total formal votes		4,221		
Informal votes				
Turnout				
Labor hold		Swing	−12.8	

=== Ipswich ===
1918 Queensland state election: Ipswich
Party	Candidate	Votes	%	±%
Labor	David Gledson	3,161	56.5	+3.1
National	James Blair	2,432	43.5	−3.1
Total formal votes		5,593	98.7	−0.2
Informal votes		71	1.3	+0.2
Turnout		5,664	88.4	−3.6
Labor hold		Swing	+3.1	

=== Ithaca ===
1918 Queensland state election: Ithaca
Party	Candidate	Votes	%	±%
Labor	John Gilday	3,030	55.5	−8.2
National	John Morton	2,434	44.5	+8.2
Total formal votes		5,464	98.0	−0.7
Informal votes		112	2.0	+0.7
Turnout		5,576	85.6	−5.2
Labor hold		Swing	−8.2	

=== Kennedy ===
1918 Queensland state election: Kennedy
Party	Candidate	Votes	%	±%
Labor	James O'Sullivan	1,328	61.1	−6.7
National	Andrew Taylor	846	38.9	+6.7
Total formal votes		2,174	98.1	+1.2
Informal votes		42	1.9	−1.2
Turnout		2,216	76.5	−14.3
Labor hold		Swing	−6.7	

=== Keppel ===
1918 Queensland state election: Keppel
Party	Candidate	Votes	%	±%
Labor	James Larcombe	2,067	57.8	−9.6
National	William Thompson	1,512	42.2	+9.6
Total formal votes		3,579	98.6	+0.1
Informal votes		49	1.4	−0.1
Turnout		3,628	83.5	−3.3
Labor hold		Swing	−9.6	

=== Kurilpa ===
1918 Queensland state election: Kurilpa
Party	Candidate	Votes	%	±%
National	James Fry	2,819	50.7	+4.8
Labor	William Hartley	2,745	49.3	−4.8
Total formal votes		5,564	99.0	−0.4
Informal votes		56	1.0	+0.4
Turnout		5,620	84.4	−6.9
National gain from Labor		Swing	+4.8	

=== Leichhardt ===
1918 Queensland state election: Leichhardt
Party	Candidate	Votes	%	±%
Labor	Herbert Hardacre	2,811	68.7	−31.3
National	William Smout	1,278	31.3	+31.3
Total formal votes		4,089	99.1	
Informal votes		35	0.9	
Turnout		4,124	75.3	
Labor hold		Swing	N/A	

==== By-election ====
- This by-election was caused by the appointment of Herbert Hardacre to the Land Court. It was held on 20 December 1919.

1919 Leichhardt state by-election
Party	Candidate	Votes	%	±%
Labor	Tom Foley	2,152	57.6	−11.1
Primary Producers	Francis Brewer	1,584	42.4	+42.4
Total formal votes		3,736	99.5	+0.4
Informal votes		18	0.5	−0.4
Turnout		3,754		
Labor hold		Swing	−11.1	

=== Lockyer ===
1918 Queensland state election: Lockyer
Party	Candidate	Votes	%	±%
Labor	Cuthbert Butler	1,716	52.5	+35.6
National	William Drayton Armstrong	1,554	47.5	−4.2
Total formal votes		3,270	99.7	+1.4
Informal votes		9	0.3	−1.4
Turnout		3,279	86.3	−3.3
Labor gain from National		Swing	N/A	

=== Logan ===
1918 Queensland state election: Logan
Party	Candidate	Votes	%	±%
Labor	Alfred James	3,044	53.1	+9.2
National	Reginald King	2,688	46.9	−9.2
Total formal votes		5,732	98.7	−0.4
Informal votes		76	1.3	+0.4
Turnout		5,808	86.4	−3.2
Labor gain from National		Swing	+9.2	

=== Mackay ===
1918 Queensland state election: Mackay
Party	Candidate	Votes	%	±%
Labor	William Forgan Smith	2,606	56.0	+1.6
National	William Manning	2,047	44.0	−1.6
Total formal votes		4,653	98.8	+0.2
Informal votes		54	1.2	−0.2
Turnout		4,707	77.8	−2.6
Labor hold		Swing	+1.6	

=== Maranoa ===
1918 Queensland state election: Maranoa
Party	Candidate	Votes	%	±%
Labor	John Hunter	2,490	59.1	−9.9
National	Robert Swan	1,722	40.9	+9.9
Total formal votes		4,212	99.0	+0.4
Informal votes		41	1.0	−0.4
Turnout		4,253	78.2	−2.2
Labor hold		Swing	−9.9	

==== By-election ====
- This by-election was caused by the resignation of John Hunter to take up the role of the Queensland Agent-General in England. It was held on 20 December 1919.

1919 Maranoa state by-election
Party	Candidate	Votes	%	±%
Primary Producers	Thomas Spencer	2,250	51.4	+51.4
Labor	James MacDougall	2,127	48.6	−10.5
Total formal votes		4,377		
Informal votes				
Turnout				
Primary Producers gain from Labor		Swing	N/A	

=== Maree ===
1918 Queensland state election: Maree
Party	Candidate	Votes	%	±%
Labor	William Bertram	2,981	53.1	−7.1
National	Pearce Douglas	2,577	45.9	+6.1
Independent	Victor Cross	56	1.0	+1.0
Total formal votes		5,614	99.0	+0.4
Informal votes		54	1.0	−0.4
Turnout		5,668	84.2	−8.6
Labor hold		Swing	N/A	

- Preferences were not distributed.

=== Maryborough ===
1918 Queensland state election: Maryborough
Party	Candidate	Votes	%	±%
Labor	David Weir	2,657	61.8	+6.1
National	Charles McGhie	1,646	38.2	−6.1
Total formal votes		4,303	99.2	+0.2
Informal votes		33	0.8	−0.2
Turnout		4,336	87.6	−4.7
Labor hold		Swing	+6.1	

=== Merthyr ===
1918 Queensland state election: Merthyr
Party	Candidate	Votes	%	±%
Labor	Peter McLachlan	3,090	52.7	−4.6
National	Peter MacGregor	2,776	47.3	+4.6
Total formal votes		5,866	99.4	0.0
Informal votes		33	0.6	0.0
Turnout		5,899	83.6	−8.1
Labor hold		Swing	−4.6	

=== Mitchell ===
1918 Queensland state election: Mitchell
Party	Candidate	Votes	%	±%
Labor	John Payne	1,996	66.8	−33.2
National	Alfred Watts	992	33.2	+33.2
Total formal votes		2,988	98.4	
Informal votes		48	1.6	
Turnout		3,036	63.5	
Labor hold		Swing	N/A	

=== Mirani ===
1918 Queensland state election: Mirani
Party	Candidate	Votes	%	±%
National	Edward Swayne	1,971	53.6	+3.7
Labor	Maurice Hynes	1,707	46.4	+2.6
Total formal votes		3,678	98.6	+2.0
Informal votes		51	1.4	−2.0
Turnout		3,729	78.6	−6.7
National hold		Swing	+1.0	

=== Mount Morgan ===
1918 Queensland state election: Mount Morgan
Party	Candidate	Votes	%	±%
Labor	James Stopford	2,707	65.6	−0.6
National	Alexander Cameron	1,419	34.4	+13.1
Total formal votes		4,126	99.0	+1.0
Informal votes		41	1.0	−1.0
Turnout		4,167	84.2	−7.1
Labor hold		Swing	N/A	

=== Mundingburra ===
1918 Queensland state election: Mundingburra
Party	Candidate	Votes	%	±%
Labor	Thomas Foley	4,066	70.1	−0.1
National	Charles Pennger	1,732	29.9	+0.1
Total formal votes		5,798	98.8	+1.7
Informal votes		73	1.2	−1.7
Turnout		5,871	82.1	−1.2
Labor hold		Swing	−0.1	

=== Murilla ===
1918 Queensland state election: Murilla
Party	Candidate	Votes	%	±%
National	Godfrey Morgan	2,385	54.2	0.0
Labor	John Durkin	2,015	45.8	0.0
Total formal votes		4,400	98.5	+0.5
Informal votes		69	1.5	−0.5
Turnout		4,469	74.4	−10.0
National gain from Farmers' Union		Swing	0.0	

=== Murrumba ===
1918 Queensland state election: Murrumba
Party	Candidate	Votes	%	±%
National	Richard Warren	4,118	66.1	+1.2
Labor	Arthur Sampson	2,113	33.9	−1.2
Total formal votes		6,231	98.9	+0.1
Informal votes		70	1.1	−0.1
Turnout		6,301	81.4	−9.7
National hold		Swing	+1.2	

=== Musgrave ===
1918 Queensland state election: Musgrave
Party	Candidate	Votes	%	±%
Labor	Thomas Armfield	1,823	54.6	+1.1
National	John White	1,518	45.4	−1.1
Total formal votes		3,341	99.4	+0.6
Informal votes		21	0.6	−0.6
Turnout		3,362	85.8	−4.2
Labor hold		Swing	+1.1	

=== Nanango ===
1918 Queensland state election: Nanango
Party	Candidate	Votes	%	±%
National	Robert Hodge	3,732	55.3	+55.3
Labor	Walter Burton	3,017	44.7	+0.5
Total formal votes		6,749	98.9	+0.2
Informal votes		75	1.1	−0.2
Turnout		6,824	80.6	−6.1
National gain from Farmers' Union		Swing	N/A	

- Sitting member Robert Hodge was elected at the previous election as a Farmers Union candidate. He joined the National QLD 1917 Party before this election.

=== Normanby ===
1918 Queensland state election: Normanby
Party	Candidate	Votes	%	±%
Labor	Jens Peterson	2,474	59.6	+3.1
National	Harry Hill	1,674	40.4	−3.1
Total formal votes		4,148	99.3	+1.7
Informal votes		37	0.9	−1.7
Turnout		4,185	77.3	−7.8
Labor hold		Swing	+3.1	

=== Nundah ===
1918 Queensland state election: Nundah
Party	Candidate	Votes	%	±%
National	Hubert Sizer	4,327	57.6	+5.9
Labor	Sid Cook	3,186	42.4	−5.9
Total formal votes		7,513	99.3	+0.3
Informal votes		51	0.7	−0.3
Turnout		7,564	84.7	−4.2
National hold		Swing	+5.9	

=== Oxley ===
1918 Queensland state election: Oxley
Party	Candidate	Votes	%	±%
National	Cecil Elphinstone	3,841	52.2	+3.4
Labor	Thomas Jones	3,511	47.8	−3.4
Total formal votes		7,352	99.5	+0.4
Informal votes		34	0.5	−0.4
Turnout		7,386	87.0	−5.7
National gain from Labor		Swing	+3.4	

=== Paddington ===
1918 Queensland state election: Paddington
Party	Candidate	Votes	%	±%
Labor	John Fihelly	3,554	60.9	−7.5
Independent	John Adamson	2,280	39.1	+39.1
Total formal votes		5,834	98.5	+0.6
Informal votes		87	1.5	−0.6
Turnout		5,921	79.7	−7.7
Labor hold		Swing	N/A	

=== Pittsworth ===
1918 Queensland state election: Pittsworth
Party	Candidate	Votes	%	±%
Labor	James Mahony	1,747	46.1	+15.4
Independent National QLD 1917	Percy Bayley	1,053	27.8	−13.5
National	David Edwards	987	26.1	−2.0
Total formal votes		3,787	98.7	−0.2
Informal votes		48	1.3	+0.2
Turnout		3,835	85.1	−3.6
Two-candidate-preferred result
Independent National QLD 1917	Percy Bayley	1,882	51.5	−8.0
Labor	James Mahony	1,771	48.5	+8.0
Independent National QLD 1917 hold		Swing	−8.0	

=== Port Curtis ===
1918 Queensland state election: Port Curtis
Party	Candidate	Votes	%	±%
Labor	George Carter	2,165	52.9	+2.2
National	John Kessell	1,929	47.1	−2.2
Total formal votes		4,094	99.3	−0.2
Informal votes		29	0.7	+0.2
Turnout		4,123	85.7	−5.0
Labor hold		Swing	+2.2	

=== Queenton ===
1918 Queensland state election: Queenton
Party	Candidate	Votes	%	±%
Labor	Vern Winstanley	1,476	63.5	−6.7
Independent National QLD 1917	William Morgan	545	23.4	+23.4
National	Alfred Smith	305	13.1	−16.7
Total formal votes		2,326	97.5	−0.7
Informal votes		60	2.5	+0.7
Turnout		2,386	81.0	−7.0
Labor hold		Swing	N/A	

- Preferences were not distributed.

=== Rockhampton ===
1918 Queensland state election: Rockhampton
Party	Candidate	Votes	%	±%
Labor	Frank Forde	3,033	68.3	+2.2
National	John Egerton	1,407	31.7	−2.2
Total formal votes		4,440	98.2	−0.1
Informal votes		79	1.8	+0.1
Turnout		4,519	76.0	−10.4
Labor hold		Swing	+2.2	

=== Rosewood ===
1918 Queensland state election: Rosewood
Party	Candidate	Votes	%	±%
Labor	William Cooper	2,630	64.8	+41.4
National	Henry Stevens	1,429	35.2	−6.0
Total formal votes		4,059	98.5	+1.6
Informal votes		61	1.5	−1.6
Turnout		4,120	86.0	−3.2
Labor gain from National		Swing	N/A	

=== South Brisbane ===
1918 Queensland state election: South Brisbane
Party	Candidate	Votes	%	±%
Labor	Edgar Free	2,986	55.0	−4.4
National	Albert Harte	2,440	45.0	+4.4
Total formal votes		5,426	98.4	+0.4
Informal votes		87	1.6	−0.4
Turnout		5,513	80.6	−6.0
Labor hold		Swing	−4.4	

=== Stanley ===
1918 Queensland state election: Stanley
Party	Candidate	Votes	%	±%
National	Henry Somerset	2,260	53.5	−6.9
Labor	Bill Heffernan	1,966	46.5	+6.9
Total formal votes		4,226	99.3	+0.6
Informal votes		28	0.7	−0.6
Turnout		4,254	80.3	−7.7
National hold		Swing	−6.9	

=== Toombul ===
1918 Queensland state election: Toombul
Party	Candidate	Votes	%	±%
National	Andrew Petrie	4,390	60.5	+3.7
Labor	Alexander McDonald	2,870	39.5	−3.7
Total formal votes		7,260	99.2	+0.2
Informal votes		60	0.8	−0.2
Turnout		7,320	75.2	−13.8
National hold		Swing	+3.7	

=== Toowong ===
1918 Queensland state election: Toowong
Party	Candidate	Votes	%	±%
National	Edward Macartney	4,610	67.7	+8.1
Labor	William McCosker	2,201	32.3	−8.1
Total formal votes		6,811	99.5	−0.1
Informal votes		37	0.5	+0.1
Turnout		6,848	84.9	−6.8
National hold		Swing	+8.1	

=== Toowoomba ===
1918 Queensland state election: Toowoomba
Party	Candidate	Votes	%	±%
Labor	Frank Brennan	2,386	54.1	+7.4
National	James Tolmie	2,024	45.9	−7.4
Total formal votes		4,410	98.8	0.0
Informal votes		52	1.2	0.0
Turnout		4,462	80.5	−6.7
Labor gain from National		Swing	+7.4	

=== Townsville ===
1918 Queensland state election: Townsville
Party	Candidate	Votes	%	±%
Labor	Daniel Ryan	2,877	54.6	+2.4
National	Hedley Gelston	2,388	45.4	−2.4
Total formal votes		5,265	98.2	−0.4
Informal votes		94	1.8	+0.4
Turnout		5,359	77.1	−2.4
Labor hold		Swing	+2.4	

=== Warrego ===
1918 Queensland state election: Warrego
Party	Candidate	Votes	%	±%
Labor	Harry Coyne	2,414	74.3	−25.7
National	Jerry Tamblyn	836	25.7	+25.7
Total formal votes		3,250	97.7	
Informal votes		77	2.3	
Turnout		3,327	61.0	
Labor hold		Swing	N/A	

=== Warwick ===
1918 Queensland state election: Warwick
Party	Candidate	Votes	%	±%
National	George Barnes	2,319	54.0	+4.7
Labor	David Swiss-Davies	1,974	46.0	+19.8
Total formal votes		4,293	99.3	+0.5
Informal votes		32	0.7	−0.5
Turnout		4,325	83.8	−8.5
National hold		Swing	−8.0	

=== Wide Bay ===
1918 Queensland state election: Wide Bay
Party	Candidate	Votes	%	±%
Labor	Andrew Thompson	2,361	52.7	+4.3
National	Charles Booker	2,118	47.3	−4.3
Total formal votes		4,479	99.1	−0.1
Informal votes		39	0.9	+0.1
Turnout		4,518	88.7	−3.1
Labor gain from National		Swing	+4.3	

=== Windsor ===
1918 Queensland state election: Windsor
Party	Candidate	Votes	%	±%
National	Charles Taylor	4,373	50.5	+3.5
Labor	Herbert McPhail	4,281	49.5	−3.5
Total formal votes		8,654	99.6	+1.1
Informal votes		34	0.4	−1.1
Turnout		8,688	87.6	−3.6
National gain from Labor		Swing	+3.5	

== See also ==
- 1918 Queensland state election
- Candidates of the Queensland state election, 1918
- Members of the Queensland Legislative Assembly, 1918-1920
