= Candidates of the 1915 Queensland state election =

The 1915 Queensland state election was held on 22 May 1915.

The main parties in the election were the Liberal Party, led by Premier Digby Denham and the Labor Party, led by Leader of the Opposition T. J. Ryan.

== By-elections ==
- On 26 October 1912, John Kessell (Liberal) replaced Edward Breslin (Labor) as the member for Port Curtis after the latter's election was declared void on 9 October 1912.
- On 26 October 1913, Ernest Bell (Liberal) replaced Arnold Wienholt (Liberal) as the member for Fassifern after the latter resigned on 28 March 1913.
- On 5 March 1914, Edward Archer (Liberal) replaced George Fox (Liberal), who had died on 27 January 1914, as the member for Normanby.

== Retiring Members ==
=== Liberal ===
- Thomas Bouchard (South Brisbane)
- James Cribb (Bremer)
- Walter Paget (Mackay)
- Thomas Welsby (Merthyr)

== Candidates ==
Sitting members at the time of the election are shown in bold text.

Electorate	Held by	Labor candidate	Liberal candidate	Other candidate(s)
Albert	Farmers			**John Appel** (QFU)
Aubigny	Liberal	Jack Jones	**Alfred Luke**	Francis Mitchell (Ind); Arthur Moore* (QFU)
Balonne	Labor	**Edward Land**		
Barcoo	Labor	**T. J. Ryan**	Charles Webster	
Bowen	Liberal	Charles Collins	**Edwin Caine**	
Bremer	Liberal	Frank Cooper	Felix Barbat	
Brisbane	Labor	**Mick Kirwan**	Charles Jenkinson	
Bulimba	Liberal	Hugh McMinn	**Walter Barnes**	
Bundaberg	Labor	**George Barber**	Lancelot Wilkinson	
Buranda	Labor	**John Huxham**	Joseph Allen	
Burke	Independent	David Swiss-Davies		**William Murphy** (Ind)
Burnett	Liberal	Albert Mack	**Bernard Corser**	
Burrum	Liberal	Albert Whitford	**Colin Rankin**	
Cairns	Labor	**William McCormack**	Neal Macrossan	
Carnarvon	Liberal	George Boyden	**Donald Gunn**	
Charters Towers	Liberal	William Wellington	**Robert Williams**	
Chillagoe	Labor	**Ted Theodore**	Edward Steele	
Cook	Liberal	Henry Ryan	**Henry Douglas**	
Cooroora	Liberal	Daniel O'Brien	**Harry Walker**	
Cunningham	Liberal		**Francis Grayson**	
Dalby	Liberal	John Connolly	**William Vowles**	Frederick Bradhurst (QFU)
Drayton	Farmers	Jacob Donges		**William Bebbington** (QFU)
Eacham	Labor	**William Gillies**	Edward Heales	
East Toowoomba	Liberal	Thomas Lonsdale	**Robert Roberts**	
Enoggera	Liberal	William Lloyd	**Richard Trout**	
Fassifern	Liberal	Bill Heffernan	**Ernest Bell**	Eaton Winks (QFU)
Fitzroy	Liberal	Harry Hartley	**Kenneth Grant**	
Flinders	Labor	**John May**		
Fortitude Valley	Labor	**David Bowman**	John Best	
Gregory	Labor	**William Hamilton**		
Gympie	Liberal	Thomas Dunstan	**George Mackay**	
Herbert	Labor	**William Lennon**	Ralph Johnson	
Ipswich	Liberal	David Gledson	**James Blair**	
Ithaca	Labor	**John Gilday**	Benjamin Harding	
Kennedy	Labor	**James O'Sullivan**	John Houghton	
Keppel	Labor	**James Larcombe**	Leopold Landsberg	
Kurilpa	Liberal	William Hartley	**James Allan**	
Leichhardt	Labor	**Herbert Hardacre**		
Lockyer	Liberal	Charles Bromley	**William Armstrong**	William McIlwraith (QFU)
Logan	Liberal	Percy Crooke	**James Stodart**	
Mackay	Liberal	William Forgan Smith	George Johnson	
Maranoa	Labor	**John Hunter**	Francis Dyer	
Maree	Labor	**William Bertram**	John Walsh	
Maryborough	Liberal	Alfred Jones	**Edward Corser**	
Merthyr	Liberal	Peter McLachlan	John Lackey	
Mirani	Liberal	John Binstead	**Edward Swayne**	Henry Turner (QFU)
Mitchell	Labor	**John Payne**		
Mount Morgan	Liberal	James Stopford	**James Crawford**	Frederick McCarthy (Ind)
Mundingburra	Labor	**Thomas Foley**	Thomas Page	
Murilla	Liberal	Joseph Collings	**Godfrey Morgan**	
Murrumba	Liberal	Arthur Sampson	**James Forsyth**	
Musgrave	Liberal	Thomas Armfield	**John White**	
Nanango	Farmers	Thomas Armstrong		**Robert Hodge** (QFU)
Normanby	Liberal	Jens Peterson	**Edward Archer**	
Nundah	Liberal	Richard Sumner	**Thomas Bridges**	
Oxley	Liberal	Thomas Jones	**Digby Denham**	
Paddington	Labor	**John Fihelly**	George Sweetman	
Pittsworth	Liberal	William Hayes	**Donald Mackintosh**	Percy Bayley (QFU)
Port Curtis	Liberal	George Carter	**John Kessell**	
Queenton	Labor	**Vernon Winstanley**	James Bradshaw	
Rockhampton	Labor	**John Adamson**	Thomas Renshaw	
Rosewood	Liberal	William Cooper	**Harry Stevens**	William Ruhno (QFU)
South Brisbane	Liberal	Edgar Free	John Burke	
Stanley	Liberal	John Sherlock	**Henry Somerset**	
Toombul	Liberal	Cuthbert Butler	**Andrew Petrie**	
Toowong	Liberal	Arthur Lilley	**Edward Macartney**	
Toowoomba	Liberal	Michael Alke	**James Tolmie**	
Townsville	Liberal	Daniel Ryan	**Robert Philp**	
Warrego	Labor	**Harry Coyne**		
Warwick	Liberal	Paul Bauers	**George Barnes**	Daniel Connolly (Ind)
Wide Bay	Liberal	Andrew Thompson	**Charles Booker**	
Windsor	Liberal	Herbert McPhail	**Hugh Macrossan**	

== See also ==
- 1915 Queensland state election
- Members of the Queensland Legislative Assembly, 1912–1915
- Members of the Queensland Legislative Assembly, 1915–1918
- List of political parties in Australia
