= Candidates of the 1918 Queensland state election =

The 1918 Queensland state election was held on 16 March 1918.

Since the previous election, the Liberal Party had reconstituted itself as the National Party. The five members of the Queensland Farmers' Union elected in 1915 contested this election as part of the National Party.

== By-elections ==
- On 18 August 1915, George Pollock (Labor) replaced William Hamilton (Labor) as the member for Gregory after the latter's appointment to the Queensland Legislative Council on 10 July 1915.
- On 1 April 1916, Thomas Wilson (Labor) replaced David Bowman (Labor) as the member for Fortitude Valley after the latter's death on 25 February 1916.
- On 31 March 1917, David Weir (Labor) replaced Alfred Jones (Labor) as the member for Maryborough after the latter's appointment to the Queensland Legislative Council on 15 February 1917.
- On 12 May 1917, Frank Forde (Labor) replaced John Adamson (Labor/Independent) as the member for Rockhampton after the latter's resignation to run for the Australian Senate on 21 March 1917.

== Retiring Members ==
- Note: Flinders Labor MLA John May died before the election; no by-election was held.

=== National ===
- Thomas Bridges MLA (Nundah)
- James Forsyth MLA (Murrumba)
- James Stodart MLA (Logan)

== Candidates ==
Sitting members at the time of the election are shown in bold text.

Electorate	Held by	Labor candidate	National candidate	Other candidates
Albert	National	William Lawson	**John Appel**	
Aubigny	National	James Desmond	**Arthur Moore**	
Balonne	Labor	**Edward Land**	David Roberts	
Barcoo	Labor	**T. J. Ryan**	Henry Buchanan	
Bowen	Labor	**Charles Collins**	John Mann	
Bremer	Labor	**Frank Cooper**	Edwin Little	
Brisbane	Labor	**Mick Kirwan**	Norman Warrall	
Bulimba	Labor	**Hugh McMinn**	Walter Barnes	Joseph Marconi (Ind)
Bundaberg	Labor	**George Barber**	William Foster	
Buranda	Labor	**John Huxham**	William Sparkes	
Burke	Independent	Darby Riordan		**William Murphy** (Ind)
Burnett	National	Joseph Warmington	**Bernard Corser**	
Burrum	National	Albert Whitford	**Colin Rankin**	
Cairns	Labor	**William McCormack**	William Griffin	
Carnarvon	National	Randolph Bedford	**Donald Gunn**	
Charters Towers	Labor	**William Wellington**	Robert Wynn Williams	
Chillagoe	Labor	**Ted Theodore**	William Worley	
Cook	Labor	**Henry Ryan**	Walter Anderson	
Cooroora	National	Hector Spratt	**Harry Walker**	
Cunningham	National	John Moir	James Purcell	**Francis Grayson** (Ind Nat)
Dalby	National	Austin McKeon	**William Vowles**	
Drayton	National	Michael Alke	**William Bebbington**	
Eacham	Labor	**William Gillies**	William Sloan	
East Toowoomba	National	James MacDougall	**Robert Roberts**	
Enoggera	Labor	**William Lloyd**	William Wright	
Fassifern	National	Joseph Sweeney	**Ernest Bell**	
Fitzroy	Labor	**Harry Hartley**	Kenneth Grant	
Flinders	Labor	John Mullan	William Little	
Fortitude Valley	Labor	**Thomas Wilson**	Bernard Revenall-Holland	
Gregory	Labor	**George Pollock**	Eric Anning	
Gympie	Labor	**Thomas Dunstan**	Alexander Glasgow	
Herbert	Labor	**William Lennon**	Ralph Johnson	
Ipswich	Labor	**David Gledson**	James Blair	
Ithaca	Labor	**John Gilday**	John Morton	
Kennedy	Labor	**James O'Sullivan**	Andrew Taylor	
Keppel	Labor	**James Larcombe**	William Thompson	
Kurilpa	Labor	**William Hartley**	James Fry	
Leichhardt	Labor	**Herbert Hardacre**	William Smout	
Lockyer	National	Cuthbert Butler	**William Drayton Armstrong**	
Logan	National	Alfred James	Reginald King	
Mackay	Labor	**William Forgan Smith**	William Manning	
Maranoa	Labor	**John Hunter**	Robert Swan	
Maree	Labor	**William Bertram**	Pearce Douglas	Victor Cross (Ind)
Maryborough	Labor	**David Weir**	Charles McGhie	
Merthyr	Labor	**Peter McLachlan**	Peter MacGregor	
Mitchell	Labor	**John Payne**	Alfred Watts	
Mirani	National	Maurice Hynes	**Edward Swayne**	
Mount Morgan	Labor	**James Stopford**	Alexander Cameron	
Mundingburra	Labor	**Thomas Foley**	Charles Pennger	
Murilla	National	John Durkin	**Godfrey Morgan**	
Murrumba	National	Arthur Sampson	Richard Warren	
Musgrave	Labor	**Thomas Armfield**	John White	
Nanango	National	Walter Burton	**Robert Hodge**	
Normanby	Labor	**Jens Peterson**	Harry Hill	
Nundah	National	Sid Cook	Hubert Sizer	
Oxley	Labor	**Thomas Jones**	Cecil Elphinstone	
Paddington	Labor	**John Fihelly**		John Adamson (Ind)
Pittsworth	National	James Mahony	David Edwards	**Percy Bayley** (Ind Nat)
Port Curtis	Labor	**George Carter**	John Kessell	
Queenton	Labor	**Vern Winstanley**	Alfred Smith	William Morgan (Ind Nat)
Rockhampton	Labor	**Frank Forde**	John Egerton	
Rosewood	National	William Cooper	**Henry Stevens**	
South Brisbane	Labor	**Edgar Free**	Albert Harte	
Stanley	National	Bill Heffernan	**Henry Somerset**	
Toombul	National	Alexander McDonald	**Andrew Petrie**	
Toowong	National	William McCosker	**Edward Macartney**	
Toowoomba	National	Frank Brennan	**James Tolmie**	
Townsville	Labor	**Daniel Ryan**	Hedley Gelston	
Warrego	Labor	**Harry Coyne**	Jerry Tamblyn	
Warwick	National	David Swiss-Davies	**George Barnes**	
Wide Bay	National	Andrew Thompson	**Charles Booker**	
Windsor	Labor	**Herbert McPhail**	Charles Taylor	

== See also ==
- 1918 Queensland state election
- Members of the Queensland Legislative Assembly, 1915–1918
- Members of the Queensland Legislative Assembly, 1918–1920
- List of political parties in Australia
