= Members of the Queensland Legislative Assembly, 1915–1918 =

This is a list of members of the 20th Legislative Assembly of Queensland from 1915 to 1918, as elected at the 1915 state election held on 22 May 1915.

The election was a landslide for the Labor Party, with the previous premier Digby Denham and many of the Denham Ministry losing their parliamentary seats.

The members elected with the support of the Queensland Farmers' Union organised as the Country Party.

Unlike in most other states at this time, the Labor Party in Queensland did not split over the conscription issue; however, the former Liberal and Country members largely joined the National Party.

Name	Party	Electorate	Term in office
John Adamson^{[4]}	Labor/Independent	Rockhampton	1907–1909; 1911–1917
John Appel	Country	Albert	1908–1929
Thomas Armfield	Labor	Musgrave	1915–1920
William Drayton Armstrong	Liberal	Lockyer	1893–1904; 1907–1918
George Philip Barber	Labor	Bundaberg	1901–1935
George Powell Barnes	Liberal	Warwick	1908–1935
Percy Bayley	Country	Pittsworth	1915–1920
William Bebbington	Country	Drayton	1912–1923
Ernest Bell	Liberal	Fassifern	1913–1930
William Bertram	Labor	Maree	1912–1929
Charles Booker	Liberal	Wide Bay	1909–1918
David Bowman^{[2]}	Labor	Fortitude Valley	1899–1902; 1904–1916
Thomas Bridges	Liberal	Nundah	1896–1907; 1909–1918
George Carter	Labor	Port Curtis	1915–1920, 1923–1929
Charles Collins	Labor	Bowen	1909–1912, 1915–1936
Frank Cooper	Labor	Bremer	1915–1946
Bernard Corser	Liberal	Burnett	1912–1928
Harry Coyne	Labor	Warrego	1908–1923
Thomas Dunstan	Labor	Gympie	1915–1929, 1935–1953
Hon John Fihelly	Labor	Paddington	1912–1922
Thomas Foley	Labor	Mundingburra	1909–1920
Frank Forde^{[4]}	Labor	Rockhampton	1917–1922, 1955–1957
James Forsyth	Liberal	Murrumba	1899–1907; 1909–1918
Edgar Free	Labor	South Brisbane	1915–1920
John Gilday	Labor	Ithaca	1912–1926
William Gillies	Labor	Eacham	1912–1925
David Gledson	Labor	Ipswich	1915–1929, 1932–1949
Francis Grayson	Liberal/Independent	Cunningham	1904–1920
Donald Gunn	Liberal	Carnarvon	1907–1920
William Hamilton^{[1]}	Labour	Gregory	1899–1915
Herbert Hardacre	Labour	Leichhardt	1893–1919
Harry Hartley	Labor	Fitzroy	1915–1929
William Hartley	Labor	Kurilpa	1915–1918
Robert Hodge	Country	Nanango	1902–1904; 1909–1920
John McEwan Hunter	Labor	Maranoa	1907–1919
John Huxham	Labor	Buranda	1908–1909, 1912–1924
Alfred Jones^{[3]}	Labor	Maryborough	1904–1909, 1915–1917, 1922–1932
Thomas Llewellyn Jones	Labor	Oxley	1915–1918
Mick Kirwan	Labor	Brisbane	1912–1932
Edward Land	Labor	Balonne	1904–1927
William Lloyd	Labor	Enoggera	1915–1920, 1923–1929
James Larcombe	Labor	Keppel	1912–1929, 1932–1956
William Lennon	Labor	Herbert	1907–1920
Edward Macartney	Liberal	Toowong	1900–1908; 1909–1920
Hon William McCormack	Labor	Cairns	1912–1930
Peter McLachlan	Labor	Merthyr	1908–1912, 1915–1920, 1923–1929
Hugh McMinn	Labor	Bulimba	1915–1918
Herbert McPhail	Labor	Windsor	1915–1918
John May^{[5]}	Labor	Flinders	1907–1917
Arthur Moore	Country	Aubigny	1915–1941
Godfrey Morgan	Country	Murilla	1909–1938
William Murphy	Independent	Burke	1904–1907; 1908–1918
James O'Sullivan	Labor	Kennedy	1909–1920
John Payne	Labor	Mitchell	1905–1928
Jens Peterson	Labor	Normanby	1915–1935
Andrew Lang Petrie	Liberal	Toombul	1893–1926
George Pollock^{[1]}	Labor	Gregory	1915–1939
Colin Rankin	Liberal	Burrum	1905–1918
Robert Roberts	Liberal	East Toowoomba	1907–1934
Daniel Ryan	Labor	Townsville	1915–1920
Henry Ryan	Labor	Cook	1915–1929
Hon T. J. Ryan	Labor	Barcoo	1909–1919
William Forgan Smith	Labor	Mackay	1915–1942
Henry Plantagenet Somerset	Liberal	Stanley	1904–1920
Henry Stevens	Liberal	Rosewood	1911–1918
James Stodart	Liberal	Logan	1896–1918
James Stopford	Labor	Mount Morgan	1915–1936
Edward Swayne	Liberal	Mirani	1907–1935
Hon Ted Theodore	Labor	Chillagoe	1909–1925
James Tolmie	Liberal	Toowoomba	1901–1907; 1909–1918
William Vowles	Liberal	Dalby	1911–1926
Harry Walker	Liberal	Cooroora	1907–1947
David Weir^{[3]}	Labor	Maryborough	1917–1929
William Wellington	Labor	Charters Towers	1915–1939
Thomas Wilson^{[2]}	Labor	Fortitude Valley	1916–1933
Vern Winstanley	Labor	Queenton	1908–1932

^{1} On 10 July 1915, William Hamilton, the Labor member for Gregory, was appointed to the Queensland Legislative Council. Labor candidate George Pollock was elected unopposed at the resulting by-election on 18 August 1915.
^{2} On 25 February 1916, David Bowman, the Labor member for Fortitude Valley, died. Labor candidate Thomas Wilson won the resulting by-election on 1 April 1916.
^{3} On 15 February 1917, Alfred Jones, the Labor member for Maryborough, was appointed to the Legislative Council. Labor candidate David Weir won the resulting by-election on 31 March 1917.
^{4} John Adamson, the member for Rockhampton, left the Labor Party in 1916 and from then on, sat as an Independent. On 21 March 1917, he resigned to contest an Australian Senate seat for Queensland at the 1917 federal election as an Independent Nationalist. Labor candidate Frank Forde won the resulting by-election on 12 May 1917.
^{5} On 29 December 1917, John May, the Labor member for Flinders, died. No by-election was held due to the proximity of the 1918 state election.

== See also ==
- 1915 Queensland state election
- Ryan Ministry (Labor) (1915–1919)
