= Members of the Queensland Legislative Assembly, 1909–1912 =

This is a list of members of the 18th Legislative Assembly of Queensland from 1909 to 1912, as elected at the 1909 state election held on 2 October 1909.

== List ==
Name	Party	Electorate	Term in office
John Adamson^{[1]}	Labor	Rockhampton	1907–1909; 1911–1917
James Allan	Liberal	South Brisbane	1909–1915
Frank Allen	Labor	Bulloo	1909–1912
John Appel	Liberal	Albert	1908–1929
William Drayton Armstrong	Liberal	Lockyer	1893–1904; 1907–1918
George Philip Barber	Labor	Bundaberg	1901–1935
George Powell Barnes	Liberal	Warwick	1908–1935
Walter Barnes	Liberal	Bulimba	1901–1915; 1918–1933
Joshua Thomas Bell^{[3]}	Liberal	Dalby	1893–1911
James Blair	Opposition	Ipswich	1902–1915
Charles Booker	Liberal	Maryborough	1909–1918
Thomas Bouchard	Liberal	South Brisbane	1904–1908; 1909–1915
David Bowman	Labor	Fortitude Valley	1899–1902; 1904–1916
James Brennan	Liberal	North Rockhampton	1907–1912
Edward Breslin	Labor	Port Curtis	1909–1912
Thomas Bridges	Liberal	Nundah	1896–1907; 1909–1918
Charles Collins	Labor	Burke	1909–1912, 1915–1936
Edward Corser	Liberal	Maryborough	1909–1915
Richard John Cottell^{[6]}	Liberal	Toowong	1908–1911
Harry Coyne	Labor	Warrego	1908–1923
James Crawford	Labor/Independent ^{[4]}	Fitzroy	1909–1915
James Cribb	Liberal	Bundamba	1893–1896; 1899–1915
Digby Denham	Liberal	Oxley	1902–1915
Henry Douglas	Opposition	Cook	1907–1915
Myles Ferricks	Labor	Bowen	1909–1912, 1920–1929
Thomas Foley	Labor	Townsville	1909–1920
Edward Barrow Forrest	Liberal	Brisbane North	1899–1912
James Forsythe	Liberal	Moreton	1899–1907; 1909–1918
George Fox	Liberal	Normanby	1877–1878; 1901–1914
Kenneth Grant	Liberal	Rockhampton	1902–1915
Francis Grayson	Liberal	Cunningham	1904–1920
Donald Gunn	Liberal	Carnarvon	1907–1920
William Hamilton	Labor	Gregory	1899–1915
Herbert Hardacre	Labor	Leichhardt	1893–1919
Arthur Hawthorn^{[2]}	Liberal	Enoggera	1902–1911
Robert Hodge	Liberal	Burnett	1902–1904; 1909–1920
David Hunter	Liberal	Woolloongabba	1908–1912
John Hunter	Labor	Maranoa	1907–1919
Denis Keogh^{[5]}	Liberal	Rosewood	1896–1902; 1904–1911
William Kidston^{[1]}	Liberal	Rockhampton	1896–1911
Edward Land	Labor	Balonne	1904–1927
William Lennon	Labor	Herbert	1907–1920
Vincent Lesina	Labor	Clermont	1899–1912
Edward Macartney^{[6]}	Liberal	Brisbane North; Toowong	1900–1908; 1909–1920
Donald MacKintosh	Liberal	Cambooya	1899–1915
Peter McLachlan	Labor	Fortitude Valley	1908–1912, 1915–1920, 1923–1929
John Mann	Opposition	Cairns	1904–1912
John May	Labor	Flinders	1907–1917
Godfrey Morgan	Liberal	Murilla	1909–1938
Daniel Mulcahy	Labor	Gympie	1901–1912
John Mullan	Labor	Charters Towers	1908–1912, 1918–1941
William Murphy	Opposition	Croydon	1904–1907; 1908–1918
Thomas Nevitt	Labor	Carpentaria	1907–1912
James O'Sullivan	Labor	Kennedy	1909–1920
Walter Paget	Liberal	Mackay	1901–1915
John Payne	Labor	Mitchell	1905–1928
Andrew Lang Petrie	Liberal	Toombul	1893–1926
Robert Philp	Liberal	Townsville	1886–1915
Colin Rankin	Liberal	Burrum	1905–1918
Robert Roberts	Liberal	Drayton & Toowoomba	1907–1934
George Ryland	Labor	Gympie	1899–1912
William Ryott Maughan	Labor	Ipswich	1898–1899; 1904–1912
Henry Plantagenet Somerset	Liberal	Stanley	1904–1920
T. J. Ryan	Labor	Barcoo	1909–1919
Harry Stevens^{[5]}	Liberal	Rosewood	1911–1918
James Stodart	Liberal	Logan	1896–1918
Edward Swayne	Liberal	Mackay	1907–1935
Ted Theodore	Labor	Woothakata	1909–1925
William Thorn	Liberal	Aubigny	1894–1904; 1908–1912
James Tolmie	Liberal	Drayton & Toowoomba	1901–1907; 1909–1918
Richard Trout^{[2]}	Liberal	Enoggera	1911–1915
William Vowles^{[3]}	Liberal	Dalby	1911–1926
Harry Walker	Liberal	Wide Bay	1907–1947
Thomas Welsby^{[6]}	Liberal	Brisbane North	1911–1915
John White	Liberal	Musgrave	1903–1904; 1907–1915
Arnold Wienholt	Liberal	Fassifern	1909–1913, 1930–1935
Vern Winstanley	Labor	Charters Towers	1908–1932

== Notes ==
^{1} On 7 February 1911, William Kidston, the Premier of Queensland and Liberal member for Rockhampton, resigned to become President of the Land Court. Labor candidate John Adamson won the resulting by-election on 25 February 1911.
^{2} On 7 February 1911, Arthur Hawthorn, the Liberal member for Enoggera, resigned following his appointment to the Queensland Legislative Council. Liberal candidate Richard Trout won the resulting by-election on 25 February 1911.
^{3} On 10 March 1911, Joshua Thomas Bell, the Liberal member for Dalby, died. At the resulting by-election on 2 April 1911, Liberal candidate William Vowles was elected.
^{4} In July 1911, the member for Fitzroy, James Crawford was expelled from the Labor Party for alleged disloyalty. He served out his term as an independent.
^{5} On 24 August 1911, Denis Keogh, the Liberal member for Rosewood, died. Liberal candidate Harry Stevens won the resulting by-election on 16 September 1911.
^{6} On 30 August 1911, Richard John Cottell, the Liberal member for Toowong, died. The Secretary for Public Lands and member for Brisbane North, Edward Macartney, resigned on 5 September. By-elections for both seats were held on 16 September 1911, with Macartney switching to Toowong, and Liberal candidate Thomas Welsby winning Brisbane North.

== See also ==
- 1909 Queensland state election
- Second Kidston Ministry (1908–1911)
- Denham Ministry (1911–1915)
