= 1918 Queensland state election =

- 16 March 1918

All 72 seats in the Legislative Assembly of Queensland 37 Assembly seats were needed for a majority
- Turnout: 80.27 (▼7.87 pp)
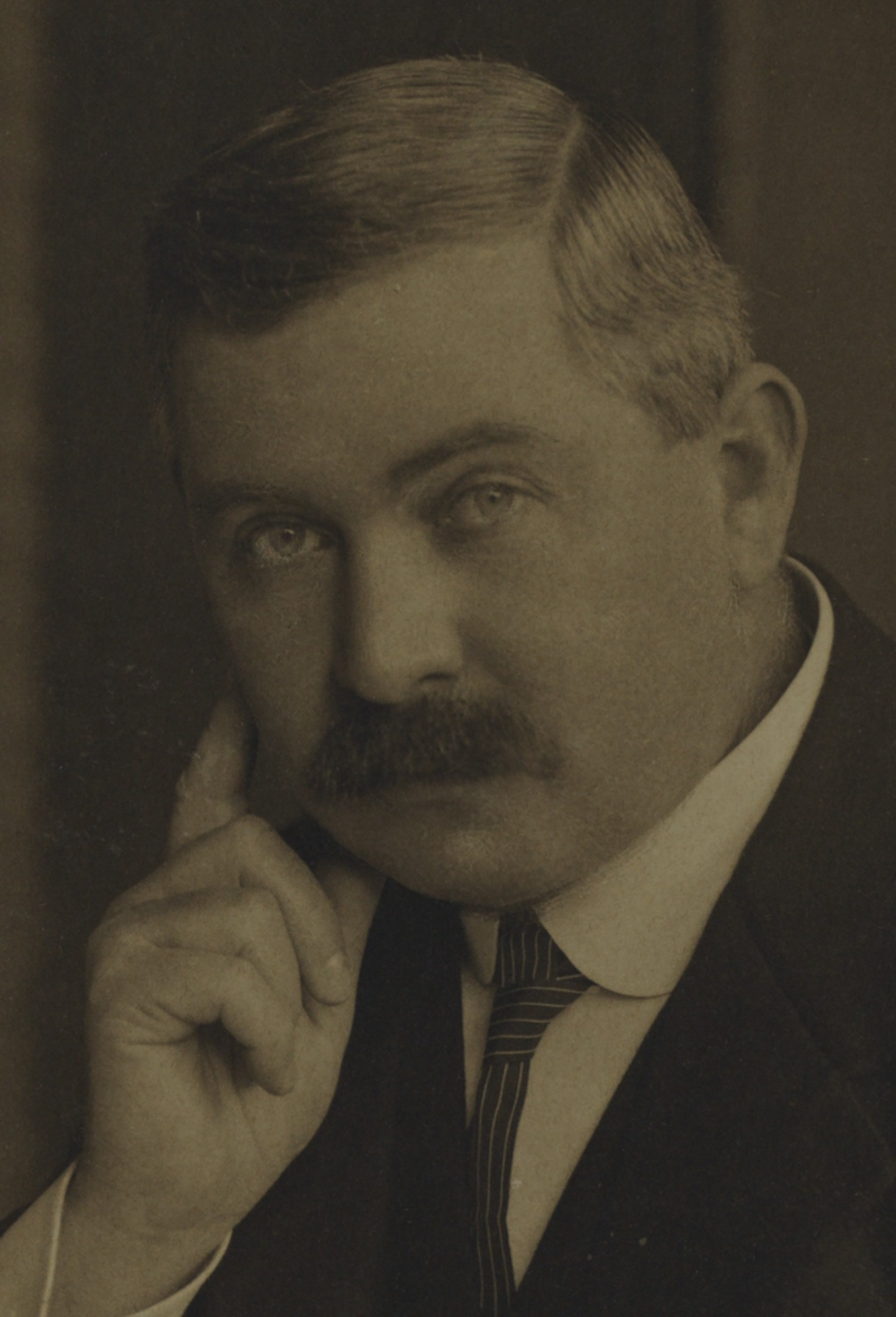

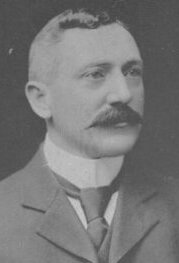
| | First party | Second party |
|---|---|---|
| Leader | T. J. Ryan | Edward Macartney |
| Party | Labor | National |
| Leader since | 6 September 1912 | 15 February 1918 |
| Leader's seat | Barcoo | Toowong |
| Last election | 45 seats, 52.06% | New party |
| Seats won | 48 | 22 |
| Seat change | ▲3 | ▲22 |
| Popular vote | 180,709 | 150,225 |
| Percentage | 53.68% | 44.62% |
| Swing | ▲1.62 | ▲2.65 |
Premier before election
T. J. Ryan
Labor
Elected Premier
T. J. Ryan
Labor

Elections were held in the Australian state of Queensland on 16 March 1918 to elect the 72 members of the state's Legislative Assembly.

== Background ==
The election was the second for the Labor government of T. J. Ryan, who had been premier since 1 June 1915. The National opposition (previously known as the Ministerialists) were led by Edward Macartney who replaced Digby Denham after the 1915 election when they were reduced to 21 seats. In turn, he was replaced by James Tolmie within three months but returned to the post shortly before the election when the latter fell ill.

== Results ==
The election saw the Labor government returned to office with an increased vote and seat count for both Labor and the National Party from the 1915 election.

Queensland state election, 16 March 1918 Legislative Assembly << 1915–1920 >>
| Enrolled voters | 424,416 | | | | |
| Votes cast | 336,647 | | Turnout | 80.27 | -7.87 |
| Informal votes | N/A | | Informal | 1.18 | -0.39 |
Summary of votes by party
| Party | Primary votes | % | Swing | Seats | Change |
| Labor | 180,709 | 53.68 | +1.62 | 48 | +3 |
| National | 150,225 | 44.62 | +2.65 | 22 | +1 |
| Independent | 3,311 | 0.98 | +0.06 | 2 | +1 |
| Total | 336,647 | | | 72 | |

== Seats changing party representation ==
This table lists changes in party representation at the 1918 election.

=== Party changes before election ===
The following seats changed party representation before the election due to the merger of Farmers Union and Liberal Party members.

| Seat | Incumbent member | Former party | New party |
|---|---|---|---|
| Albert | John Appel | Farmers' Union | National Party |
| Aubigny | Arthur Moore | Farmers' Union | National Party |
| Cunningham | Francis Grayson | Liberal Party | Independent National |
| Drayton | William Bebbington | Farmers' Union | National Party |
| Murilla | Godfrey Morgan | Farmers' Union | National Party |
| Nanango | Robert Hodge | Farmers' Union | National Party |
| Pittsworth | Percy Bayley | Farmers' Union | Independent National |

=== Seats changing hands at election ===
| Seat | Incumbent member | Party | New member | Party |
|---|---|---|---|---|
| Bulimba | Hugh McMinn | Labor | Walter Barnes | National |
| Burke | William Murphy | Independent | Darby Riordan | Labor |
| Burrum | Colin Rankin | National | Albert Whitford | Labor |
| Kurilpa | William Hartley | Labor | James Fry | National |
| Lockyer | William Armstrong | National | Cuthbert Butler | Labor |
| Logan | James Stodart | National | Alfred James | Labor |
| Oxley | Thomas Jones | Labor | Cecil Elphinstone | National |
| Rosewood | Henry Stevens | National | William Cooper | Labor |
| Toowoomba | James Tolmie | National | Frank Brennan | Labor |
| Wide Bay | Charles Booker | National | Andrew Thompson | Labor |
| Windsor | Herbert McPhail | Labor | Charles Taylor | National |

- Members listed in italics did not recontest their seats.

== Aftermath ==
T.J. Ryan resigned as premier a year after the state election to run successfully for the federal seat of West Sydney in 1919. Ryan was replaced as premier by Ted Theodore. Theodore called the 1920 election one year into his premiership and two years after the 1918 election. Macartney was later replaced for a second time, this time by William Vowles. Within a few months though, Vowles created the Queensland Country Party. However, because Vowles had created the Country Party using most of the rural-based National MLAs, Vowles was able to remain as Opposition Leader.

== See also ==
- Candidates of the Queensland state election, 1918
- Members of the Queensland Legislative Assembly, 1915–1918
- Members of the Queensland Legislative Assembly, 1918–1920
- Ryan Ministry
