= Electoral results for the district of Drayton =

Queensland, Australia, district election results

This is a list of electoral results for the electoral district of Drayton in Queensland state elections.

== Members for Drayton ==
The following people were elected in the seat of Drayton:

Member	Party	Term
William Bebbington	Ministerial	27 Apr 1912 – 12 May 1923
William Bebbington	Farmers' Union	27 Apr 1912 – 12 May 1923
William Bebbington	Country	27 Apr 1912 – 12 May 1923

== Election results ==
=== Elections in the 1920s ===
1920 Queensland state election: Drayton
Party	Candidate	Votes	%	±%
Country	William Bebbington	2,449	59.8	+59.8
Labor	Lister Hopkins	1,648	40.2	−7.1
Total formal votes		4,097	99.2	+0.1
Informal votes		34	0.8	−0.1
Turnout		4,131	86.3	+2.1
Country gain from National		Swing	N/A	

=== Elections in the 1910s ===
1918 Queensland state election: Drayton
Party	Candidate	Votes	%	±%
National	William Bebbington	2,164	52.7	+52.7
Labor	Michael Alke	1,940	47.3	+13.2
Total formal votes		4,104	99.1	+1.2
Informal votes		37	0.9	−1.2
Turnout		4,141	84.2	−3.4
National gain from Farmers' Union		Swing	N/A	

- Sitting member William Bebbington was elected at the previous election as a Farmers Union candidate. He joined the National QLD 1917 party before this election.

1915 Queensland state election: Drayton
Party	Candidate	Votes	%	±%
Farmers' Union	William Bebbington	2,473	65.9	+65.9
Labor	Jacob Donges	1,278	34.1	+1.1
Total formal votes		3,751	97.9	−0.9
Informal votes		82	2.1	+0.9
Turnout		3,833	87.6	+11.8
Farmers' Union gain from Liberal		Swing	N/A	

1912 Queensland state election: Drayton
Party	Candidate	Votes	%	±%
Liberal	William Bebbington	1,962	62.2	
Labor	James Desmond	1,040	33.0	
Independent	William Binns	151	4.8	
Total formal votes		3,153	98.8	
Informal votes		38	1.2	
Turnout		3,191	75.8	
Liberal hold		Swing		
