= Thomas Bouchard =

Thomas Bouchard may refer to:

- Thomas J. Bouchard Jr. (born 1937), American psychologist and geneticist
- Thomas Bouchard (politician) (1865–1943), solicitor and member of the Queensland Legislative Assembly
