= Electoral district of Oxley (disambiguation) =

The electoral district of Oxley is an electoral district in the Australian state of New South Wales.

The electoral district of Oxley may also refer to:

- Electoral district of Oxley (Queensland), a former state electoral district in Queensland
- Division of Oxley, a federal electoral division in Queensland
