= Ted Maher (politician) =

Australian politician

Ted Maher CBE
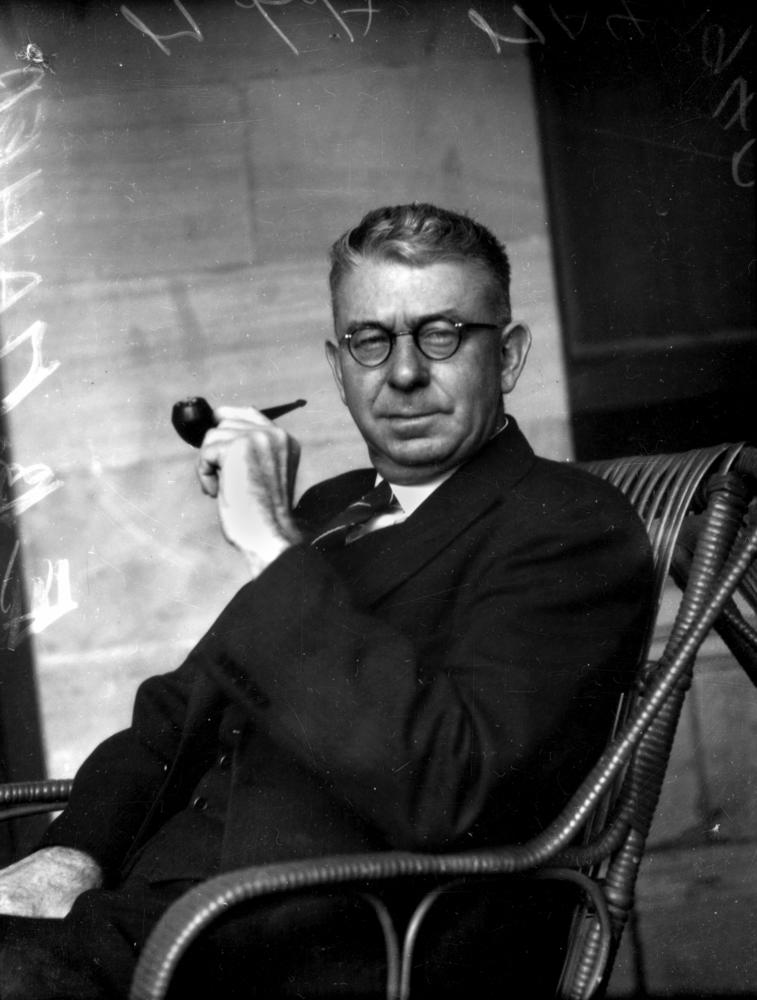

Senator for Queensland
- In office 22 February 1950 – 30 June 1965

Leader of the Opposition of Queensland
- In office 15 July 1936 – 21 May 1941
- Preceded by: Arthur Edward Moore
- Succeeded by: Frank Nicklin

Member of the Queensland Legislative Assembly for Rosewood
- In office 11 May 1929 – 11 June 1932
- Preceded by: William Cooper
- Succeeded by: Seat abolished

Member of the Queensland Legislative Assembly for West Moreton
- In office 11 June 1932 – 27 October 1949
- Preceded by: New seat
- Succeeded by: Seat abolished

Personal details
- Born: Edmund Bede Maher; 8 June 1891 Forbes, New South Wales, Australia
- Died: 31 December 1982 (aged 91) Bribie Island, Queensland, Australia
- Party: Country Party
- Other political affiliations: Country and Progressive National Party
- Occupation: Grazier, businessman

Edmund Bede "Ted" Maher CBE (8 June 1891 – 31 December 1982) was an Australian politician, Leader of the Opposition in the Parliament of Queensland 1936 to 1941 and Federal senator 1950 to 1965.

Born in Forbes, New South Wales, he was educated at Catholic schools before becoming a post office worker and stock agent. In 1921, he moved to Queensland, becoming a grazier, as well as a businessman and company director. In 1929 he was elected to the Legislative Assembly of Queensland as the Country Party member for Rosewood, transferring to West Moreton in 1932. He served as Leader of the Opposition and Leader of the Country Party from 1936 to 1941.

Maher was the last leader of his party who did not become Premier until Mike Horan (served 2001–2003, with the party now being known as the National Party).

In 1949 he left the Assembly and was elected to the Australian Senate as a Country Party Senator for Queensland. He remained in the Senate until his retirement in 1964, taking effect in 1965. Maher died in 1982.

Political offices
Preceded by Arthur Edward Moore	Leader of the Opposition of Queensland; 1936–1941	Succeeded by Frank Nicklin
Parliament of Queensland
Preceded by William Cooper	Member for Rosewood; 1929–1932	Abolished
New seat	Member for West Moreton; 1932–1949	Abolished
