= Denis Keogh =

Australian politician

Member of the Queensland Legislative Assembly for Rosewood
- In office 10 March 1896 – 11 August 1896
- Preceded by: James Cribb
- Succeeded by: Himself
- In office 29 August 1896 – 11 March 1902
- Preceded by: Himself
- Succeeded by: Robert Hodge
- In office 12 December 1904 – 24 August 1911
- Preceded by: Robert Hodge
- Succeeded by: Henry Stevens

Personal details
- Born: Denis Thomas Keogh; 1838 Briarfield, Galway, Ireland
- Died: 24 August 1911 (aged 74) Ipswich, Australia
- Resting place: Ipswich General Cemetery
- Party: Ministerial
- Other political affiliations: Labour
- Spouse: Agnes McPhail (m.1858 d.1899)
- Occupation: Storekeeper

Denis Thomas Keogh (1838 – 24 August 1911) was a member of the Queensland Legislative Assembly.

== Early life ==
Keogh was born at Galway, Ireland, the son of Thomas Joseph Keogh and his wife Margaret (née O'Toole). He was educated at St. Patrick's College, Thurles in Tipperary and St Thomas' College in Newbridge. He arrived at Melbourne in 1854, working as a clerk and an auctioneer before moving to Queensland in 1859. Here he managed Alderton and Juandah stations.

He married Agnes McPhail in 1858 (died 1899) and together had one daughter.

From 1862 until his death Keogh was a storekeeper in Ipswich. He was a strong supporter of the Irish and Catholic movements, and the Hibernian Benefits Society in Ipswich.

== Political life ==
Keogh served on the Ipswich council for eleven years, and became mayor in 1893.

First representing Labour, he won the seat of Rosewood at the 1896 Queensland Colonial election, but the election was declared void and a by-election was called. He won again and held the seat until 1902 when he was defeated by Robert Hodge. Hodge however was unseated by petition in December 1904 and Keogh was appointed to represent Rosewood once again. He went on to hold the seat until his death in 1911.

== Final days ==
On Thursday 24 August 1911, Keogh left Parliament House in Brisbane in good health, taking the 10:00 pm Ipswich goods train, alighting at 11:30 pm, presumed to have experienced a heart attack, before being conveyed home where he died. His funeral proceeded from his Brisbane Street residence to the Ipswich General Cemetery.

Parliament of Queensland
Preceded by James Cribb	Member for Rosewood; 1896	Succeeded by Himself
Preceded by Himself	Member for Rosewood; 1896–1902	Succeeded by Robert Hodge
Preceded by Robert Hodge	Member for Rosewood; 1904–1911	Succeeded by Henry Stevens
