= James Allan (Queensland politician) =

Australian politician

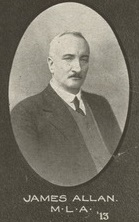

Member of the Queensland Legislative Assembly for Brisbane South
- In office 2 October 1909 – 27 April 1912
- Preceded by: John Huxham
- Succeeded by: Thomas Bouchard

Member of the Queensland Legislative Assembly for Kurilpa
- In office 27 April 1912 – 22 May 1915
- Preceded by: New seat
- Succeeded by: William Hartley

Personal details
- Born: James Allan; 20 December 1856 Airdrie, North Lanarkshire, Scotland
- Died: 26 January 1938 (aged 81) Brisbane, Queensland, Australia
- Party: Ministerialist
- Other political affiliations: Queensland Liberal
- Spouse: Eliza Balloch Stark (m.1885 d.1942)
- Education: Andersonian University
- Occupation: Draper

James Allan (20 December 1856 – 26 January 1938) was a draper and a member of the Queensland Legislative Assembly.

== Early life and business career ==
Allan was born in Airdrie, North Lanarkshire, Scotland, to parents Robert Allan and his wife Mary (née Hodge). Receiving his final education at Andersonian University, Allan started his working life as an apprentice draper to Daley & Co. in Glasgow before arriving in Australia in 1879. Here he worked as an assistant for D. L. Brown & Co. and in 1882, along with Robert Stark formed Allan & Stark, drapers.

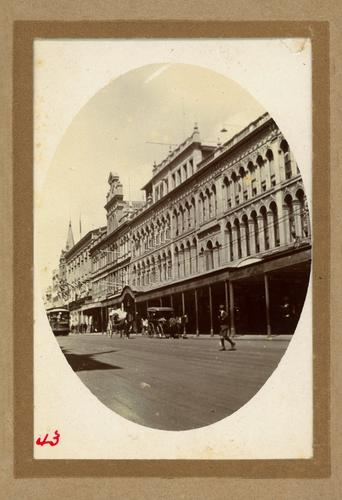
Allan & Stark Store at Queen Street, Brisbane ca. 1919

The business started out at South Brisbane, but by 1895 business had so greatly increased that they moved to Queen Street, in the centre of Brisbane. In 1911 Allan & Stark was formed into a private company with many of its employees having acquired an interest in it. In 1919 it became a public company and later incorporated the Civil Service Stores and also Stuparts Ltd, who were based in Maryborough. Their former Queen Street premises survives and is heritage-listed as the Allan and Stark Building.

== Political career ==
Allan was an alderman in the South Brisbane Municipal Council between 1892 and 1895. Representing the Ministerialists, he won the seat of Brisbane South at the 1909 state election. In 1912, he switched to the new electorate of Kurilpa but lost his seat to Labour's William Hartley in 1915.

During his time in parliament, Premier William Kidston was known to seek Allan's advice on financial policy.

== Personal life ==
Allan was involved with several philanthropic organisations. He was actively involved with the YMCA and served a term as president of the organisation. In 1917 he was appointed honorary chief commissioner, treasurer, and chairman of the London executive committee of the YMCA army and navy work abroad. He served in World War I in England ad France from 1917 until after the Armistice. He was also a member of the Town Planning Association and a foundation member of Rotary in Queensland.

He also took a keen interest in literature, authoring "A holiday ramble in new Zealand" and in 1915, he edited "Letters from a young Queenslander" and "Mesopotamia and India", the latter two being written by his son, Robert Marshall Allan about his experiences during World War I. Robert Allan went on to be a professor of obstetrics at the University of Melbourne.

On 4 June 1885, Allan married Eliza Balloch Stark at South Brisbane and together had two sons and two daughters. Allan died in Brisbane on Australia Day, 1938 and was privately interred.

Parliament of Queensland
Preceded by John Huxham	Member for Brisbane South; 1909–1912	Succeeded by Thomas Bouchard
New seat	Member for Kurilpa; 1912–1915	Succeeded by William Hartley
