= Cecil Elphinstone =

Australian politician (1874–1964)

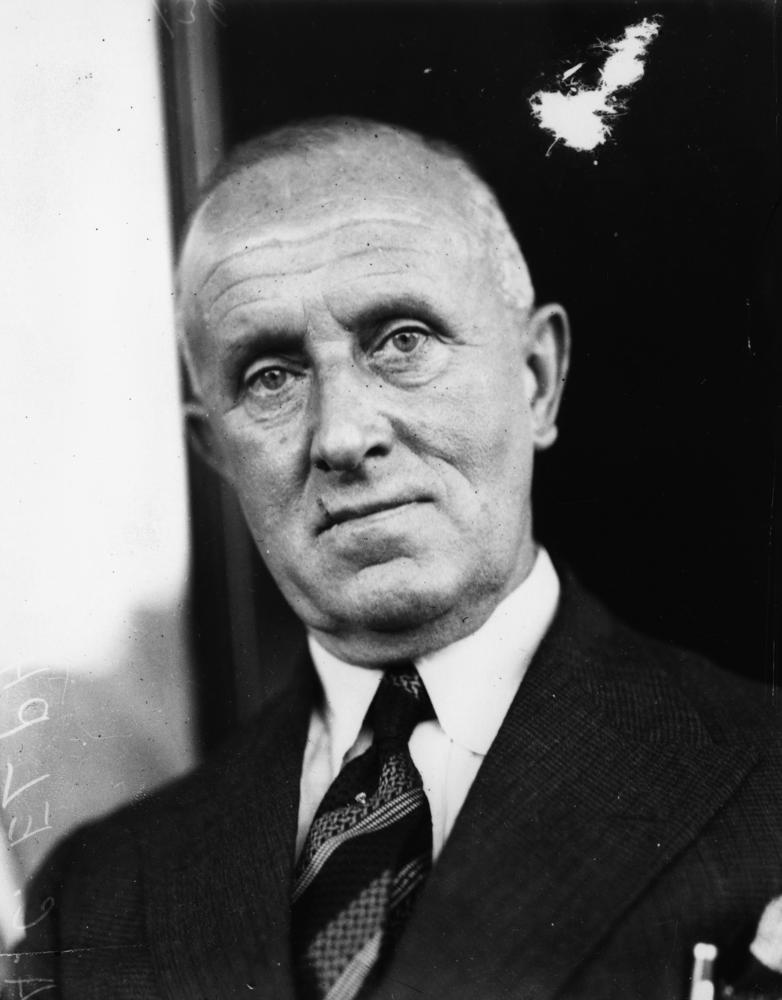
- Cecil Elphinstone in 1936.

Member of the Queensland Legislative Assembly for Oxley
- In office 16 May 1918 – 11 May 1929
- Preceded by: Thomas Jones
- Succeeded by: Thomas Nimmo

Personal details
- Born: Augustus Cecil Elphinstone; 13 September 1874 London, England
- Died: 24 March 1964 (aged 89) Brisbane, Queensland, Australia
- Party: National Party
- Other political affiliations: United Party of Queensland, Country and Progressive National Party
- Occupation: Businessman

Augustus Cecil Elphinstone (1874–1964) was an Australian businessman and politician. He served in the Legislative Assembly of Queensland for the electoral district of Oxley (Queensland) from 1918 until 1929.

== Biography ==
Augustus Cecil Elphinstone was born on 13 September 1874 in London, England. His father was Henry Walker Elphinstone, a clerk, and his mother was Harriet Anne Elphinstone, née Eldred.

After receiving his education at Forest House College, Woodford, he worked briefly for the Bank of England before travelling to Charters Towers, Queensland in 1892. He returned to England in 1894 and embarked on a 14-year career in insurance, eventually serving as general manager of the Welsh Insurance Corporation. During this time, he married Louisa Dinah Lloyd on 5 October 1897, with whom he had five children, and he also spent seven years in the British Territorial Army.

In 1912 he returned to Queensland and experimented with tobacco farming near Bowen and then moved to Brisbane in 1914 to found the Queensland Cement and Lime Company. During World War I he was involved in several business ventures and served in the Australian Imperial Force for a few months in 1918.

Also in 1918, Elphinstone began his political career, standing for the electoral district of Oxley (Queensland) as a member of the National Party and winning a seat in the Legislative Assembly of Queensland. He resigned from his party in 1929 and soon after lost his seat.

He died in Brisbane on 24 March 1964.

Parliament of Queensland
| Preceded by Thomas Jones | Member for Oxley; 1918–1929 | Succeeded by Thomas Nimmo |
