= Thomas Bouchard (politician) =

Australian politician

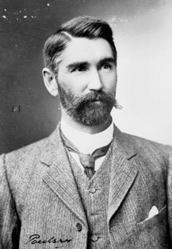

Member of the Queensland Legislative Assembly for Brisbane South
- In office 27 August 1904 – 5 February 1908
- Preceded by: Alec Lamont
- Succeeded by: Peter Airey
- In office 2 October 1909 – 22 May 1915
- Preceded by: John Huxham
- Succeeded by: Edgar Free

Personal details
- Born: Thomas William Bouchard; 8 October 1865 Brisbane, Queensland, Australia
- Died: 2 November 1943 (aged 78) Brisbane, Queensland, Australia
- Party: Ministerialist
- Spouse: Jessie Margaret Hill (m.1891 d.1937)
- Occupation: Solicitor

Thomas William Bouchard (8 October 1865 – 2 November 1943) was a solicitor and a member of the Queensland Legislative Assembly.

== Early life ==
Bouchard was born in Brisbane, Queensland, to parents Josiah Bouchard and his wife Eliza Ann (née Arrowsmith). After attending South Brisbane State School and also being privately educated, he became an articled clerk at age 14, working for Peter MacPherson from 1879 until 1892. Admitted as a solicitor in 1892, he soon after went into partnership with F. Holland to form Bouchard & Holland, Solicitors.

== Political career ==
First entering politics as an alderman on the South Brisbane Municipal Council, Bouchard entered Queensland Parliament as a Ministerialist at the 1904 state election, winning the seat of Brisbane South. He held the seat for four years but was defeated in a close-run contest in 1908.

The following year, the people of Queensland went to the polls for the third successive year, and Bouchard won back his seat of South Brisbane and held it until he declined to stand at the 1915 state election. During his public career he was also the Commissioner for the South Brisbane Technical College and School of Arts.

== Sporting career ==
Bouchard was a keen lawn bowls player, being one of Queensland's best known champions and an interstate representative. He was president of the South Brisbane Bowling Club in 1906–1907 and went on to be president of the Queensland Bowling Association.

== Personal life ==
In 1891, Bouchard married Jessie Margaret Hill (died 1937) in Brisbane and together had one daughter. Reinhold died in Brisbane in November 1943. His funeral moved from his former residence at Beaconsfield St, Highgate Hill, to the Mount Thompson Crematorium.

Parliament of Queensland
Preceded by Alec Lamont	Member for Brisbane South; 1904–1908	Succeeded by Peter Airey
Preceded by John Huxham	Member for Brisbane South; 1909–1915	Succeeded by Edgar Free
