= William Cooper (Australian politician) =

Australian politician

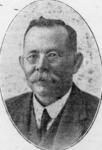

Member of the Queensland Legislative Assembly for Rosewood
- In office 16 March 1918 – 11 May 1929
- Preceded by: Henry Stevens
- Succeeded by: Ted Maher

Personal details
- Born: William Cooper; 1868 Maitland, New South Wales, Australia
- Died: 29 November 1957 (aged 88-89) Ipswich, Queensland, Australia
- Party: Labor
- Spouse: Ida Emma Ernst (m.1902 d.1955)
- Children: Six
- Occupation: Blacksmith, railway worker

William Cooper (1868 - 29 November 1957) was a member of the Queensland Legislative Assembly.

== Biography ==
Cooper was born at Maitland, New South Wales, the son of Henry John Cooper and his wife Elizabeth (née Chaffe). He was educated in Maitland and was a blacksmith in Western Australia and a railway worker on the Rosewood-Grandchester line.

On 1 January 1902, he married Ida Emma Ernst (died 1955) and together had four sons and two daughters. Cooper died at Ipswich in November 1957.

== Public life ==
Cooper, the Labor Party candidate, won the seat of Rosewood at the 1918 state election, defeating the sitting member, Henry Stevens. Cooper held the seat until 1929, when he was defeated by Ted Maher.

Parliament of Queensland
Preceded by Henry Stevens	Member for Rosewood; 1918–1929	Succeeded by Ted Maher
