= Edgar Free =

Australian politician

Member of the Queensland Legislative Assembly for South Brisbane
- In office 22 May 1915 – 9 October 1920
- Preceded by: Thomas Bouchard
- Succeeded by: Myles Ferricks

Personal details
- Born: Edgar Noah Free; 20 June 1872 Ballarat, Victoria, Australia
- Died: 12 February 1938 (aged 65) Brisbane, Queensland, Australia
- Resting place: South Brisbane Cemetery
- Party: Labor
- Spouse: Elizabeth N. Bulcock
- Relations: Frank Bulcock (nephew)
- Occupation: Dentist

Edgar Noah Free (20 June 1872 – 12 February 1938) was a dentist and a member of the Queensland Legislative Assembly.

== Early life ==
Free was born in Ballarat, Victoria, to parents George William Free and his wife Amelia (née Turner). Receiving his schooling in Ballarat, he later attended Grey's Dental College in Melbourne before moving to Brisbane where he went on to practice in Queen Street for many years.

== Political career ==
At the 1915 Queensland state election, Free, representing the Labor Party, won the seat of South Brisbane. He held the seat until 1920, when he retired from parliament to live in Sydney, where his son was studying medicine at Sydney University.

== Personal life ==
Free married Elizabeth N. Bulcock and together had one son and one daughter. He died in Brisbane in February 1938 and was buried at South Brisbane Cemetery.

Parliament of Queensland
Preceded by Thomas Bouchard	Member for South Brisbane; 1915–1920	Succeeded by Myles Ferricks
