= John May (Australian politician) =

Australian politician from Queensland (1844–1917)

Member of the Queensland Legislative Assembly for Flinders
- In office 18 May 1907 – 29 Dec 1917
- Preceded by: Peter Airey
- Succeeded by: John Mullan

Personal details
- Born: John May; May 1844 Kent, England
- Died: 29 December 1917 (aged 73)
- Resting place: Toowong Cemetery
- Party: Labor
- Spouse: Maria Ellen Mellor [née Smith) (m.1909 d.1928)
- Education: Royal Agricultural University

John May (May 1844 – 29 December 1917) was a member of the Queensland Legislative Assembly.

== Biography ==
May was born in Kent, England, to parents John May and his wife Mary (née James). He attended the Royal Agricultural University and while still in England worked in the mercantile marine. When he arrived in Queensland he worked as a miner and a drover.

On 14 October 1909 he married Maria Ellen Mellor (died 1928). It is not known if he had been previously married. He died in December 1917 after falling under a train at Eagle Junction station and was buried at Toowong Cemetery.

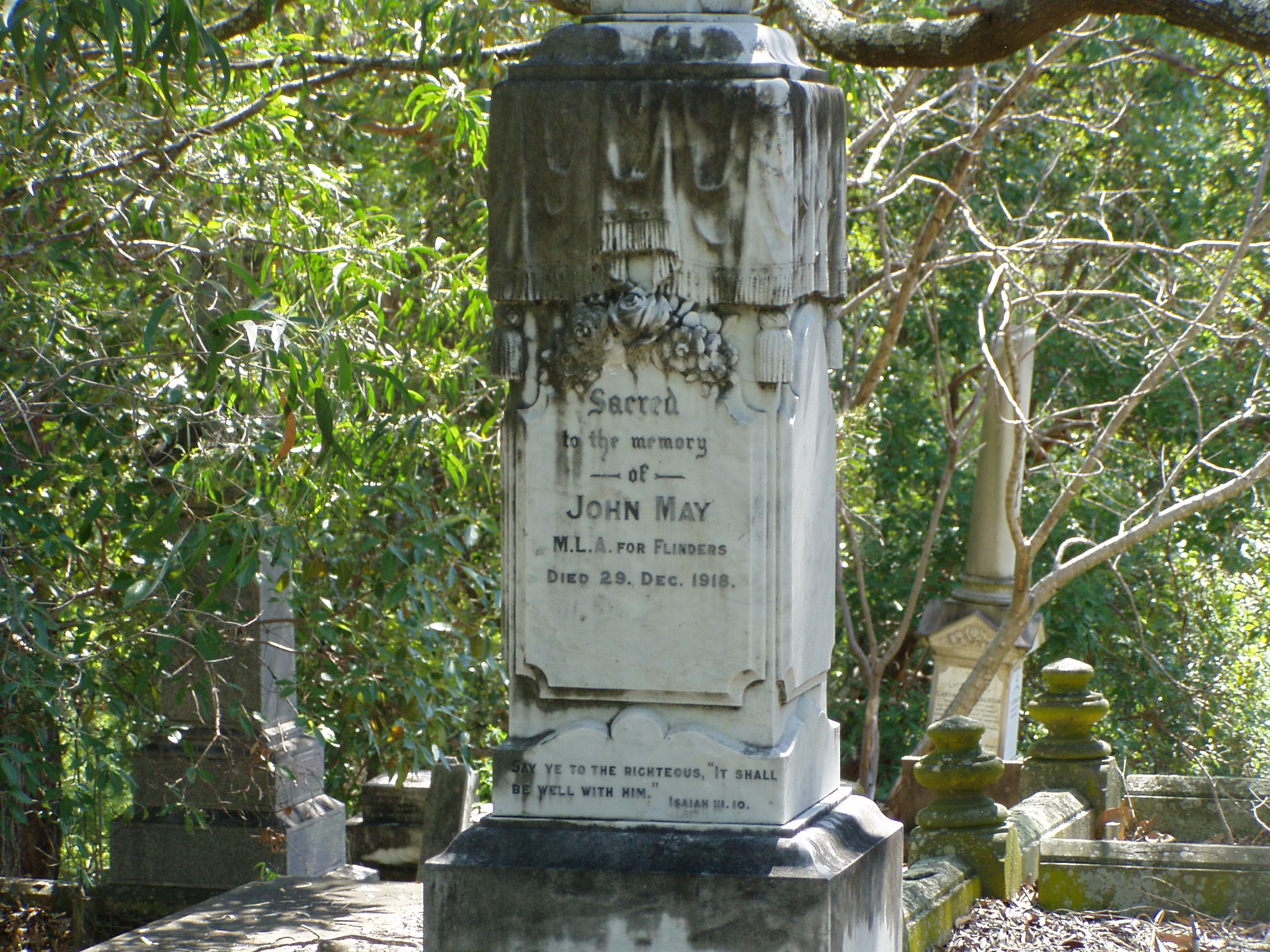
John May's headstone at Toowong Cemetery. Note that the year of death is incorrect.

== Political career ==
May, representing the Labor Party, was the member for Flinders from 1907 until his death in 1917.

Parliament of Queensland
Preceded by Peter Airey	Member for Flinders; 1907–1917	Succeeded by John Mullan
