= Thomas Llewellyn Jones =

Australian politician

The Hon Thomas Jones
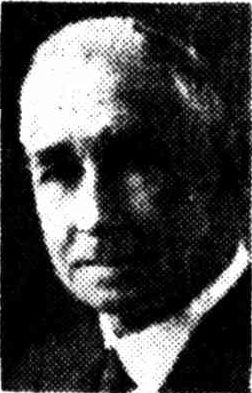
- Thomas Llewellyn Jones, 1941

Member of the Queensland Legislative Assembly for Oxley
- In office 22 May 1915 – 16 March 1918
- Preceded by: Digby Denham
- Succeeded by: Cecil Elphinstone

Member of the Queensland Legislative Council
- In office 18 August 1919 – 23 March 1922

Personal details
- Born: Thomas Llewellyn Jones; 8 March 1872 Welshpool, Montgomeryshire, Wales
- Died: 18 June 1946 (aged 74) Brisbane, Queensland, Australia
- Party: Labor
- Spouse(s): Amy Alice Lane (m. 1901 d. 1936), Gwendolen Gee (m. 1937 d. 1982)
- Occupation: Company director

Thomas Llewellyn Jones ( 8 March 1872 – 18 June 1946) was a company director and member of both the Queensland Legislative Council and Queensland Legislative Assembly in Australia

== Early life ==
Jones was born at Welshpool in Montgomeryshire, Wales, to John Jones his wife Elizabeth (née Llewellyn). He moved to Queensland at a young age and attended Brisbane Normal and Brisbane Grammar schools.

== Political career ==
Jones, representing the Labor, won the state seat of Oxley at the 1915 Queensland state election, defeating the then premier of Queensland, Digby Denham. He held the seat for one term before losing to Cecil Elphinstone in 1918.

When the Labour Party starting forming governments in Queensland, it found much of its legislation being blocked by a hostile council, where members had been appointed for life by successive conservative governments. After a failed referendum in May 1917, The premier, Ryan, tried a new tactic, and later that year advised the governor, Sir Hamilton John Goold-Adams, to appoint 13 new members whose allegiance lay with Labour to the council.

In August 1919, Jones was one of three additional new members, and sat for two and a half years until the council was abolished in March 1922.

== Personal life ==
Jones was twice married, first to Amy Alice Lane in 1901 and together they had a son and daughter. Amy died in 1936, and a year later he married Gwendolen Gee (died 1982).

He was the chairman director of the provision merchants and commercial agents Foggitt, Jones & Co., a trustee of the Brisbane Grammar School, a senate member of the Queensland University, chairman of the Brisbane Hospital Board and commodore of the Royal Queensland Yacht Squadron.

Jones died in Brisbane in June 1946 and was cremated at Mount Thompson crematorium.

Parliament of Queensland
Preceded by Digby Denham	Member for Oxley; 1915–1918	Succeeded by Cecil Elphinstone
