= Ernest Bell (Australian politician) =

Pastoralist and politician

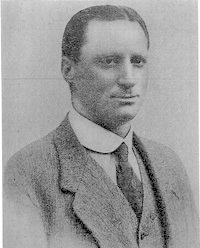

Member of the Queensland Legislative Assembly for Fassifern
- In office 27 April 1913 – 2 May 1930
- Preceded by: Arnold Wienholt
- Succeeded by: Arnold Wienholt

Personal details
- Born: Ernest Thomas Bell; 31 March 1880 Camboon, Queensland, Australia
- Died: 2 May 1930 (aged 50) Brisbane, Queensland, Australia
- Resting place: Toowong Cemetery
- Party: CPNP
- Other political affiliations: Ministerialist, Liberal, National, Country Party, Queensland United Party
- Spouse: Pauline Eva Taylor (m.1910 d.1970)
- Occupation: Pastoralist

Ernest Thomas Bell (31 March 1880 – 2 May 1930) was a pastoralist and member of the Queensland Legislative Assembly.

== Biography ==
Bell was born in Camboon, Queensland, to parents James Thomas Marsh Bell and his wife Gertrude Augusta (née Norton) and attended Toowoomba Grammar School and Ipswich Grammar School. When he left school he was the manager of Combargno Station, Roma.

He was involved in many agricultural associations over the years including president of the Fassifern Agricultural and Pastoral Association and chairman of the Australian Meat Council.

On 17 August 1910, Bell married Pauline Eva Taylor (died 1970) in Brisbane and together had one son and three daughters. He died in office in May 1930 and his funeral proceeded from St John's Church of England Cathedral to the Toowong Cemetery.

== Political career ==
Bell represented the state seat of Fassifern from 1913 until his death in 1930. In that time he represented several parties that were opposed to the Labor Party.

Parliament of Queensland
Preceded by Arnold Wienholt	Member for Fassifern; 1913–1930	Succeeded by Arnold Wienholt
