= John Gilday =

Australian politician

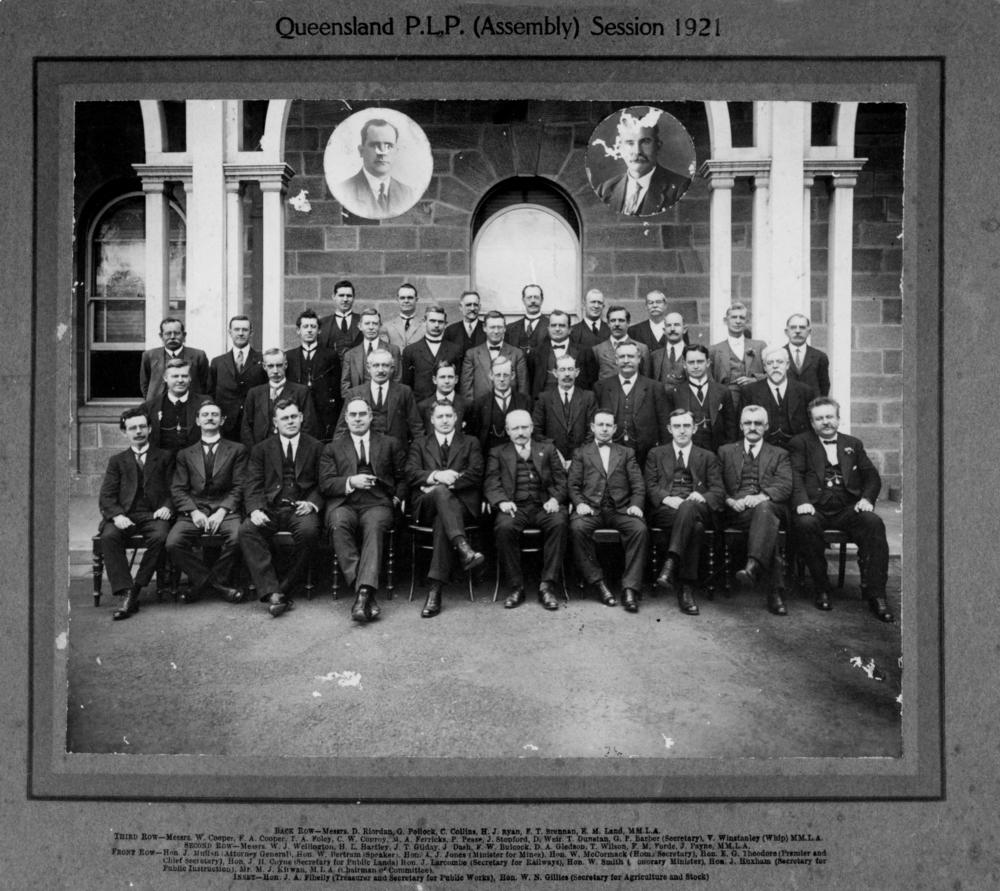
- Queensland Parliamentary Labor Party (Assembly) 1921 - Gilday is third from the left - Second row

Member of the Queensland Legislative Assembly for Ithaca
- In office 27 Apr 1912 – 8 May 1926
- Preceded by: New seat
- Succeeded by: Ned Hanlon

Personal details
- Born: John Theophilus Gilday; 1874 Ballarat, Victoria, Australia
- Died: 29 August 1937 (aged 62 or 63) Brisbane, Queensland, Australia
- Resting place: Toowong Cemetery
- Party: Labor
- Spouse: Mary Walker (m.1899 d.1953)
- Occupation: Meatworker

John Theophilus Gilday (1874 – 29 August 1937) was a meatworker and member of the Queensland Legislative Assembly.

== Biography ==
Gilday was born in Ballarat, Victoria, to parents Martin Gilday and his wife Honorah (née Corcoran). He went to Ballarat State School and became a meatworker in New South Wales. He was a director of the Daily Standard & The Worker newspapers.

On 1 February 1899, he married Mary Walker (died 1953) in Brisbane and together had two sons and two daughters. He died in August 1937 and his funeral proceeded from his late residence in Paddington to the Toowong Cemetery.

== Public career ==
Gilday, for the Labor Party, held the seat of Ithaca in the Queensland Legislative Assembly from its inception in 1912 until his retirement from politics in 1926.

Parliament of Queensland
New seat	Member for Ithaca; 1912–1926	Succeeded by Ned Hanlon
