= Hugh McMinn =

Australian politician

Member of the Queensland Legislative Assembly for Bulimba
- In office 22 May 1915 – 16 March 1918
- Preceded by: Walter Barnes
- Succeeded by: Walter Barnes

Personal details
- Born: Hugh Cameron McMinn; 1865 Callander, Perthshire, Scotland
- Died: 2 December 1941 (aged 76) Wynnum, Queensland, Australia
- Party: Labor Party
- Spouse: Margaret Jane Catherwood (m.1892 d.1944)
- Occupation: Storekeeper

Hugh Cameron McMinn (1865 – 2 December 1941) was a member of the Queensland Legislative Assembly in Australia.

== Biography ==
McMinn was born in Callander, Perthshire, the son of James McMinn and his wife Agnes (née Cameron). He arrived in Australia when he was about 16 and worked as a storekeeper. After his time in parliament he was an inspector of playgrounds for the education department.

On 11 May 1892 he married Margaret Jane Catherwood in Brisbane, and together they had a son and two daughters. McMinn died in December 1941 and was cremated at the Mt Thompson Crematorium. Catherwood died in 1944.

== Public career ==
After unsuccessfully contesting the state election in 1912, McMinn, for the Labor Party, won the seat of Bulimba at the 1915 Queensland state election. In doing so, he defeated the Queensland Treasurer, Walter Barnes. McMinn only lasted one term in the parliament and lost his seat back to Barnes at the 1918 Queensland state election.

Parliament of Queensland
Preceded by Walter Barnes	Member for Bulimba; 1915–1918	Succeeded by Walter Barnes
