= Henry Stevens (Australian politician) =

Australian politician

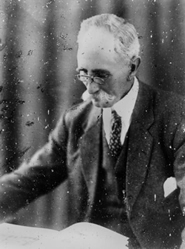

Member of the Queensland Legislative Assembly for Rosewood
- In office 16 September 1911 – 16 March 1918
- Preceded by: Denis Keogh
- Succeeded by: William Cooper

Personal details
- Born: Henry Moreton Stevens; 1854 South Brisbane, Colony of New South Wales
- Died: 15 November 1935 (aged 80-81) Rosewood, Queensland, Australia
- Resting place: Tallegalla Cemetery
- Party: Queensland Liberal
- Other political affiliations: Ministerialist
- Spouse(s): Helen Hunt Mossop (m.1880 d.1904), Jessie Mabel Webster (m.1911 d.1956)
- Occupation: Company director

Henry Moreton Stevens (1854 - 15 November 1935) was a member of the Queensland Legislative Assembly.

== Biography ==
Stevens was born at South Brisbane, Queensland, the son of Samuel Stevens, and his wife Jane (née Colton). Samuel Stevens was a cooper and an active member of the South Brisbane community, who stood for a seat as Alderman in the council elections of 1866. Henry was educated at the Brisbane National School and was a director of the Lanefield Co-Operative Dairy Co. and also the Queensland Farmers' Co-Operative District Co..

On 27 October 1880 he married Helen Hunt Mossop (died 1904) at Goodna and together had one son and one daughter. Helen died in 1904 and Stevens then married Jessie Mabel Webster (died 1956) on 26 April 1911. He died in November 1935 and his funeral proceeded from the Rosewood Congregational Church to the Tallegalla Cemetery.

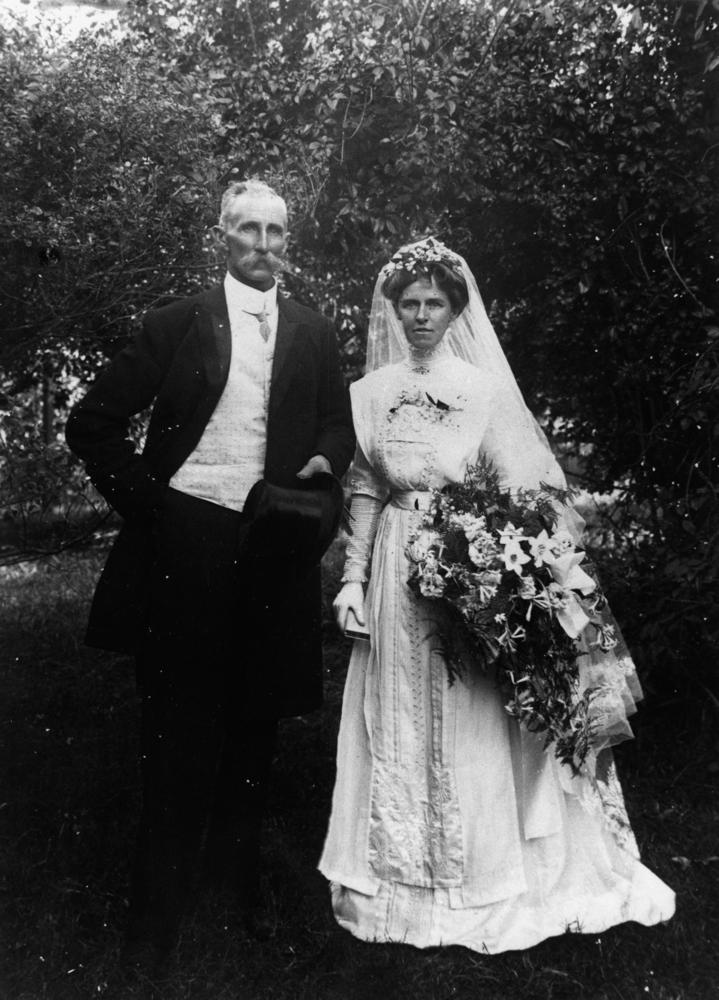
Henry Moreton Stevens and Jessie Mabel Webster's wedding,1911

== Public life ==
Stevens, the Ministerialist candidate, won the by-election in 1911 for the seat of Rosewood in the Queensland Legislative Assembly, replacing Denis Keogh, who had died in August of that year. He held the seat until the 1918 state election, when he lost to William Cooper of the Labor Party.

Parliament of Queensland
Preceded by Denis Keogh	Member for Rosewood; 1911–1918	Succeeded by William Cooper
