= William Hartley (politician) =

Australian politician

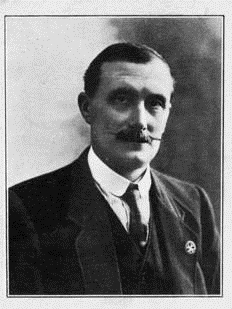

Member of the Queensland Legislative Assembly for Kurilpa
- In office 22 May 1915 – 16 March 1918
- Preceded by: James Allan
- Succeeded by: James Fry

Personal details
- Born: William Hartley; 1868 Halifax, England
- Died: 15 March 1950 (aged 81–82) Brisbane, Queensland, Australia
- Party: Labor
- Occupation: Labourer

William Hartley (1868 – 15 March 1950) was an Australian politician. He was the Labor member for Kurilpa in the Legislative Assembly of Queensland from 1915 to 1918.

Parliament of Queensland
Preceded by James Allan	Member for Kurilpa; 1915 - 1918	Succeeded by James Fry
