= William Bebbington =

Australian politician (1856–1939)

Member of the Queensland Legislative Assembly for Drayton
- In office 27 Apr 1912 – 12 May 1923
- Preceded by: New seat
- Succeeded by: Seat abolished

Personal details
- Born: William Bebbington; 19 October 1856 Baschurch, Salop, England
- Died: 31 July 1939 (aged 82) Toowoomba, Queensland, Australia
- Resting place: Drayton and Toowoomba Cemetery
- Party: Country Party (1920)
- Other political affiliations: Ministerial, Queensland Farmers' Union, National
- Spouse: Amelia Jones(m.1881 d.1903)
- Occupation: Cheese maker

William Bebbington (19 October 1856 – 31 July 1939) was a cheese maker and member of the Queensland Legislative Assembly.

== Biography ==
Bebbington was born at Baschurch, Salop, England, to Thomas Bebbington and his wife Martha. He worked as a clerk for the Midland Railway before arriving in Australia and settling in Toowoomba. He started a cheese factory in the town and eventually became the President of the Queensland Cheese Manufacturers' Association.

In 1881 he married Amelia Jones (died 1903) in Baschurch and together had two sons and three daughters. He died in July 1939 and was buried in the Drayton and Toowoomba Cemetery.

== Political career ==
Bebbington was the member for Drayton in the Queensland Legislative Assembly from 1912 until 1923. During that time he represented the Ministerial Party, Farmers' Union, National Party, and an early version of what became the Country Party.

Parliament of Queensland
New seat	Member for Drayton; 1912–1923	Abolished
