= Electoral district of Drayton =

Drayton Queensland—Legislative Assembly
- State: Queensland
- Created: 1912
- Abolished: 1923
- Demographic: Rural
- Coordinates: 27°36′0″S 151°54′30″E

Drayton was a Legislative Assembly electorate in the state of Queensland, Australia.

== History ==
Drayton was created by the 1910 Electoral Districts Act, taking effect at the 1912 elections. It consisted of the area around Toowoomba; the Electoral district of Drayton and Toowoomba was abolished in 1912.

Drayton was renamed Electoral district of Cunningham in 1923.

== Members ==
The following people were elected in the seat of Drayton:

Member	Party	Term
William Bebbington	Ministerial	27 Apr 1912 – 12 May 1923
William Bebbington	Farmers' Union	27 Apr 1912 – 12 May 1923
William Bebbington	Country	27 Apr 1912 – 12 May 1923

== See also ==
- Electoral districts of Queensland
- Members of the Queensland Legislative Assembly by year
- Category:Members of the Queensland Legislative Assembly by name
