= Electoral district of Rosewood =

Rosewood Queensland—Legislative Assembly
- State: Queensland
- Created: 1878
- Abolished: 1932
- Namesake: Rosewood, Queensland
- Demographic: Rural
- Coordinates: 27°38′S 152°35′E

The electoral district of Rosewood was a Legislative Assembly electorate in the state of Queensland, Australia.

== History ==
Rosewood was created in the 1878 Electoral Districts Act, taking effect at the 1878 colonial election, and existed until the 1932 state election. It was based on the part of West Moreton west of Ipswich.

When Rosewood was abolished in 1932, it was incorporated again into the district of West Moreton.

== Members ==
The following people were elected in the seat of Rosewood:

Member	Party	Term
Archibald Meston	none	Nov 1878 – Jul 1882
Jean Isambert	none	Jul 1882 – Oct 1892
James Foote	none	Nov 1892 – May 1893
James Cribb	Ministerial / Lib.	May 1893 – Mar 1896
Denis Keogh	Labor	Mar 1896 – Mar 1902
Robert Hodge	Farmers’ Rep.	Mar 1902 – Dec 1904
Denis Keogh	Labor	Dec 1904 – Sep 1911
Henry Stevens	Liberal	Sep 1911 – Mar 1918
William Cooper	Labor	Mar 1918 – May 1929
Ted Maher	CPNP	May 1929 – Jun 1932
