= Charles Joseph Booker =

Australian politician (1865–1925)

Charles Booker
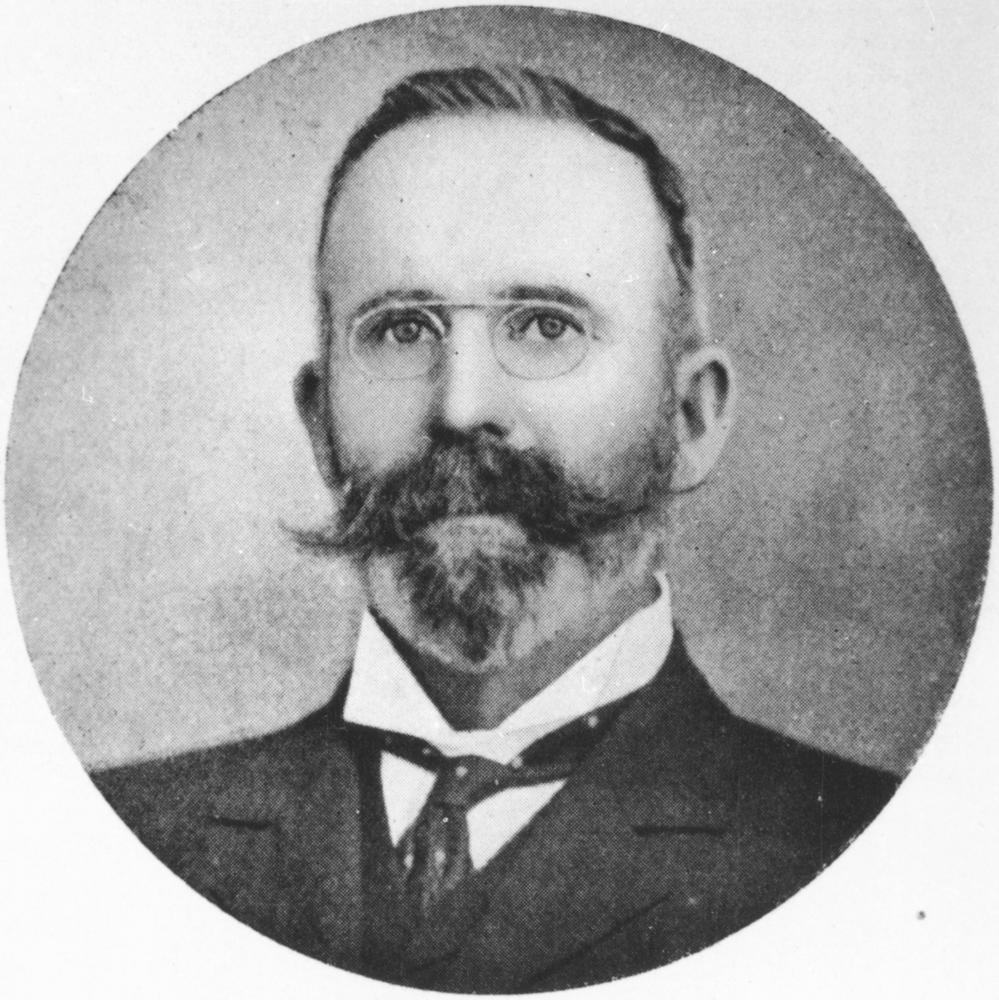

Member of the Queensland Legislative Assembly for Maryborough
- In office 2 October 1909 – 27 April 1912 Serving with Edward Corser
- Preceded by: John Adamson
- Succeeded by: Edward Corser

Member of the Queensland Legislative Assembly for Wide Bay
- In office 27 April 1912 – 16 March 1918
- Preceded by: Harry Walker
- Succeeded by: Andrew Thompson

Personal details
- Born: Charles Joseph Booker; 3 June 1865 Maryborough, Queensland, Australia
- Died: 4 June 1925 (aged 60) Warra, Queensland, Australia
- Resting place: St Matthew's Church of England Cemetery
- Party: Queensland Liberal
- Other political affiliations: Ministerialist
- Spouse: Jessie Irene Carter (m.1891 d.1937)
- Occupation: Company director

Charles Joseph Booker (3 June 1865 – 4 June 1925) was a member of the Queensland Legislative Assembly.

== Biography ==
Booker was born in Maryborough, Queensland, the son of Charles Edward Sydney Booker and his wife Margaret (née Shea). He attended Ipswich Grammar School and later on was a Director of Walkers Limited.

In 1891, Booker married Jessie Irene Carter (died 1937) in Sydney and together had one son. He died in Warra in June 1925 and his funeral proceeded from Lumeah, his Graceville residence, to St Matthew's Church of England Cemetery.

== Public life ==
After unsuccessfully standing for the two member seat of Maryborough at the 1907 Queensland state elections, Booker won the seat two years later in 1909. Maryborough was reduced to a one-member constituency for the 1912 Queensland state elections and he then won the seat of Wide Bay, holding it until his defeat by Andrew Thompson in 1918.

Booker was also a member of the Perry Shire Council.

Parliament of Queensland
Preceded by John Adamson	Member for Maryborough; 1909–1912; Served alongside: Edward Corser	Succeeded by Edward Corser
Preceded by Harry Walker	Member for Wide Bay; 1912–1918	Succeeded by Andrew Thompson
