= Robert Hodge (Australian politician) =

Australian politician (1866–1924)

Member of the Queensland Legislative Assembly for Rosewood
- In office 11 March 1902 – 12 December 1904
- Preceded by: Denis Keogh
- Succeeded by: Denis Keogh

Member of the Queensland Legislative Assembly for Burnett
- In office 2 October 1909 – 27 April 1912
- Preceded by: Alfred Jones
- Succeeded by: Bernard Corser

Member of the Queensland Legislative Assembly for Nanango
- In office 27 April 1912 – 9 October 1920
- Preceded by: New seat
- Succeeded by: James Edwards

Personal details
- Born: Robert Samuel Hodge; 1866 Bridgwater, Somerset, England
- Died: 8 April 1924 (aged 57) Corinda, Australia
- Resting place: St Matthew's Cemetery, Sherwood
- Party: National
- Other political affiliations: FREP, Ministerialist, Queensland Farmers' Union
- Spouse: Mary Elizabeth Iszlaub (m.1886 d.1935)
- Occupation: Publican

Robert Samuel Hodge (1866 – 8 April 1924) was a member of the Queensland Legislative Assembly.

== Biography ==
Hodge was born at Bridgwater, Somerset, the son of James Hodge and his wife Mary Ann (née Baker). On his arrival in Australia He was a publican and storekeeper in Wondai and a produce merchant in Rosewood.

He married Mary Elizabeth Iszlaub (died 1935) at Ipswich in 1886 and together had three sons and three daughters. Hodge died at Corinda in April 1924 and his funeral proceeded from his residence, The Laurels in Corinda to St Matthew's Cemetery, Sherwood.

== Public life ==
Hodge won the seat of Rosewood at the 1902 Queensland state election. He won again in 1904 by two votes but the Court Of Elections Tribunal, led by Judge Patrick Real overturned the result and in December 1904 awarded the seat to Labour's Denis Keogh.

In 1909 he stood again, this time as a Ministerial candidate for the seat of Burnett and was successful, defeating the sitting member, Alfred Jones. He only held Burnett for one term, switching to the new seat of Nanango in 1912, and now representing the Queensland Farmers' Union. He was defeated by fellow Farmer's Union member, James Edwards in 1920. He stood again in 1923 but was well beaten by both other candidates.

== Legacy ==
The locality of Hodgleigh in the South Burnett Region was named after him.

Parliament of Queensland
Preceded by Denis Keogh	Member for Rosewood; 1902–1904	Succeeded by Denis Keogh
Preceded by Alfred Jones	Member for Burnett; 1909–1912	Succeeded by Bernard Corser
New seat	Member for Nanango; 1912–1920	Succeeded by James Edwards
