= Electoral district of Oxley (Queensland) =

Oxley Queensland—Legislative Assembly
- State: Queensland
- Created: 1873
- Abolished: 1950
- Namesake: Oxley, Queensland
- Demographic: Rural
- Coordinates: 27°34′S 152°59′E

Oxley was a Legislative Assembly electorate in the state of Queensland.

== History ==
This one-member electorate was created in the redistribution of 1872 (taking effect at the 1873 elections) from the electoral district of East Moreton. It covered from Toowong to Enoggera to Goodna, including Yeronga and Kurilpa.

In 1888, the part north of the Brisbane River was separated into the electoral district of Toowong, while Oxley extended south to Browns Plains and Woodridge.

Oxley was abolished in the redistribution 1949 (taking effect at the 1950 elections) by dividing it into Sherwood, Yeronga and electoral district of Mount Gravatt.

== Members ==
The following people represented this electorate:

Member	Party	Term
Samuel Griffith	none	25 Nov 1873 – 15 Nov 1878
Samuel Grimes	Ministerial	3 Dec 1878 – 18 Jun 1902 ^{[d]}
Digby Denham	Ministerial	3 Jul 1902 ^{[b]} – 22 May 1915
Thomas Jones	Labor	22 May 1915 – 16 Mar 1918
Cecil Elphinstone	National; United; CPNP	16 Mar 1918 – 11 May 1929
Thomas Nimmo	CPNP; UAP	11 May 1929 – 6 Feb 1943
Tom Kerr	UAP; QPP; Liberal Party	17 Apr 1943 – 29 Apr 1950

^{b} = by-election
^{d} = died in office

== See also ==
- Electoral districts of Queensland
- Members of the Queensland Legislative Assembly by year
- Category:Members of the Queensland Legislative Assembly by name
