= Results of the 1920 Queensland state election =

Queensland state election, 9 October 1920 Legislative Assembly << 1918–1923 >>
Enrolled voters	445,681^{[1]}				
Votes cast	356,226		Turnout	79.93	–0.34
Informal votes	3,600		Informal	1.01	–0.17
Summary of votes by party
Party	Primary votes	%	Swing	Seats	Change
Labor	168,455	47.77	–5.91	38	– 8
National	90,730	25.73	–18.89	13	– 9
Country	60,170	17.06	+17.06	18	+ 18
Northern Country	20,246	5.74	+5.74	2	+ 2
Independent Country	6,055	1.72	+1.72	0	± 0
National Labor	4,216	1.20	+1.20	0	± 0
Independent	2,794	0.79	–0.90	0	– 2
Total	352,666			72	

This is a list of electoral district results for the 1920 Queensland state election.

At the time, the voting system in Queensland was based on contingency voting, which was similar to the modern optional preferential voting system. In electorates with 3 or more candidates, preferences were not distributed if a candidate received more than 50% of the primary vote.

If none received more than 50%, all except the top two candidates were eliminated from the count and their preferences distributed between the two leaders, with the one receiving the most votes declared the winner.

== Results by electoral district ==
=== Albert ===
1920 Queensland state election: Albert
Party	Candidate	Votes	%	±%
Country	John Appel	3,688	69.5	+69.5
Labor	Richard Holden	1,621	30.5	−7.4
Total formal votes		5,309	99.5	+0.4
Informal votes		26	0.5	−0.4
Turnout		5,335	80.4	0.0
Country gain from National		Swing	N/A	

=== Aubigny ===
1920 Queensland state election: Aubigny
Party	Candidate	Votes	%	±%
Country	Arthur Moore	2,527	62.2	+62.2
Labor	William Brady	1,535	37.8	−10.5
Total formal votes		4,062	99.5	+0.2
Informal votes		20	0.5	−0.2
Turnout		4,082	87.0	+1.8
Country gain from National		Swing	N/A	

=== Balonne ===
1920 Queensland state election: Balonne
Party	Candidate	Votes	%	±%
Labor	Edward Land	1,747	59.2	−1.7
Country	Richard Nantes	1,202	40.8	+40.8
Total formal votes		2,949	99.3	+0.5
Informal votes		22	0.7	−0.5
Turnout		2,971	61.7	−5.9
Labor hold		Swing	−1.7	

=== Barcoo ===
1920 Queensland state election: Barcoo
Party	Candidate	Votes	%	±%
Labor	Frank Bulcock	2,628	70.4	−3.4
Northern Country	James Cullen	1,105	29.6	+29.6
Total formal votes		3,733	99.0	+0.2
Informal votes		37	1.0	−0.2
Turnout		3,770	71.5	−1.6
Labor hold		Swing	−3.4	

=== Bowen ===
1920 Queensland state election: Bowen
Party	Candidate	Votes	%	±%
Labor	Charles Collins	3,576	63.8	+4.4
Northern Country	John Leahy	2,032	36.2	+36.2
Total formal votes		5,608	98.9	−0.1
Informal votes		62	1.1	+0.1
Turnout		5,670		
Labor hold		Swing	+4.4	

=== Bremer ===
1920 Queensland state election: Bremer
Party	Candidate	Votes	%	±%
Labor	Frank Cooper	3,667	61.5	−4.5
National	Alfred Stephenson	2,078	34.8	+0.8
Industrialist	Albert Welsby	222	3.7	+3.7
Total formal votes		5,967	98.7	−0.1
Informal votes		79	1.3	+0.1
Turnout		6,046	92.4	+3.1
Labor hold		Swing	N/A	

=== Brisbane ===
1920 Queensland state election: Brisbane
Party	Candidate	Votes	%	±%
Labor	Mick Kirwan	2,971	54.0	−6.6
National	Patrick Currie	2,531	46.0	+6.6
Total formal votes		5,502	98.5	+0.6
Informal votes		84	1.5	−0.6
Turnout		5,586	69.0	
Labor hold		Swing	−6.6	

=== Bulimba ===
1920 Queensland state election: Bulimba
Party	Candidate	Votes	%	±%
National	Walter Barnes	6,345	55.7	+4.4
Labor	George Marriott	5,053	44.3	−3.2
Total formal votes		11,398	99.2	+0.1
Informal votes		86	0.8	
Turnout		11,484	77.0	−9.8
National hold		Swing	N/A	

=== Bundaberg ===
1920 Queensland state election: Bundaberg
Party	Candidate	Votes	%	±%
Labor	George Barber	2,788	57.4	−9.1
Country	John Forgan	2,073	42.6	+42.6
Total formal votes		4,861	98.8	−0.5
Informal votes		60	1.2	+0.5
Turnout		4,921	73.8	−9.2
Labor hold		Swing	−9.1	

=== Buranda ===
1920 Queensland state election: Buranda
Party	Candidate	Votes	%	±%
Labor	John Huxham	3,503	55.9	−4.9
National	Alfred Faulkner	2,768	44.1	+4.9
Total formal votes		6,271	99.3	0.0
Informal votes		46	0.7	0.0
Turnout		6,317	84.9	−0.5
Labor hold		Swing	−4.9	

=== Burke ===
1920 Queensland state election: Burke
Party	Candidate	Votes	%	±%
Labor	Darby Riordan	998	66.6	+7.6
Northern Country	John Williamson	501	33.4	+33.4
Total formal votes		1,499	97.0	−0.4
Informal votes		46	3.0	+0.4
Turnout		1,545	69.6	−3.6
Labor hold		Swing	+7.6	

=== Burnett ===
1920 Queensland state election: Burnett
Party	Candidate	Votes	%	±%
Country	Bernard Corser	3,129	66.2	+66.2
Labor	Francis Hill	1,596	33.8	−7.6
Total formal votes		4,725	99.3	0.0
Informal votes		33	0.7	0.0
Turnout		4,758	84.0	+1.0
Country gain from National		Swing	N/A	

=== Burrum ===
1920 Queensland state election: Burrum
Party	Candidate	Votes	%	±%
Country	William Brand	2,252	57.7	+57.7
Labor	Albert Whitford	1,652	42.3	−9.3
Total formal votes		3,904	99.5	+1.9
Informal votes		20	0.5	−1.9
Turnout		3,924	83.2	−0.8
Country gain from Labor		Swing	N/A	

=== Cairns ===
1920 Queensland state election: Cairns
Party	Candidate	Votes	%	±%
Labor	William McCormack	3,198	54.7	−6.7
Northern Country	Charles Hives	2,650	45.3	+45.3
Total formal votes		5,848	98.8	+0.4
Informal votes		73	1.2	−0.4
Turnout		5,921	78.8	+2.6
Labor hold		Swing	−6.7	

=== Carnarvon ===
1920 Queensland state election: Carnarvon
Party	Candidate	Votes	%	±%
Country	Edward Costello	2,935	54.2	+54.2
Labor	Alfred Jones	2,484	45.8	−2.0
Total formal votes		5,419	99.8	+0.3
Informal votes		13	0.2	−0.3
Turnout		5,432	82.5	−0.8
Country gain from National		Swing	N/A	

=== Charters Towers ===
1920 Queensland state election: Charters Towers
Party	Candidate	Votes	%	±%
Labor	William Wellington	1,392	54.7	−2.0
Northern Country	David Guthrie	1,152	45.3	+45.3
Total formal votes		2,544	99.5	+1.7
Informal votes		13	0.5	−1.7
Turnout		2,557	77.3	−2.1
Labor hold		Swing	−2.0	

=== Chillagoe ===
1920 Queensland state election: Chillagoe
Party	Candidate	Votes	%	±%
Labor	Ted Theodore	1,384	77.8	+5.0
Northern Country	John Egerton	394	22.2	+22.2
Total formal votes		1,778	97.7	−1.0
Informal votes		41	2.3	+1.0
Turnout		1,819	81.3	+2.8
Labor hold		Swing	+5.0	

=== Cook ===
1920 Queensland state election: Cook
Party	Candidate	Votes	%	±%
Labor	Henry Ryan	1,475	55.9	−4.7
Northern Country	Frederick Craig	1,166	44.1	+44.1
Total formal votes		2,641	98.4	−1.7
Informal votes		42	1.6	+1.7
Turnout		2,683	72.7	−1.4
Labor hold		Swing	−4.7	

=== Cooroora ===
1920 Queensland state election: Cooroora
Party	Candidate	Votes	%	±%
Country	Harry Walker	unopposed		
Country gain from National		Swing		

=== Cunningham ===
1920 Queensland state election: Cunningham
Party	Candidate	Votes	%	±%
Country	William Deacon	unopposed		
Country gain from Independent		Swing		

=== Dalby ===
1920 Queensland state election: Dalby
Party	Candidate	Votes	%	±%
Country	William Vowles	3,005	62.5	+62.5
Labor	James Connolly	1,804	37.5	−5.6
Total formal votes		4,849	99.3	−0.1
Informal votes		35	0.7	+0.1
Turnout		4,884	83.9	+4.1
Country gain from National		Swing	N/A	

=== Drayton ===
1920 Queensland state election: Drayton
Party	Candidate	Votes	%	±%
Country	William Bebbington	2,449	59.8	+59.8
Labor	Lister Hopkins	1,648	40.2	−7.1
Total formal votes		4,097	99.2	+0.1
Informal votes		34	0.8	−0.1
Turnout		4,131	86.3	+2.1
Country gain from National		Swing	N/A	

=== Eacham ===
1920 Queensland state election: Eacham
Party	Candidate	Votes	%	±%
Labor	William Gillies	2,581	55.3	+0.5
Independent Country	James McCarthy	2,085	44.7	+44.7
Total formal votes		4,666	99.2	+0.5
Informal votes		39	0.8	−0.5
Turnout		4,705	82.3	+2.1
Labor hold		Swing	+0.5	

=== East Toowoomba ===
1920 Queensland state election: East Toowoomba
Party	Candidate	Votes	%	±%
National	Robert Roberts	3,022	61.8	+10.4
Labor	John Mattingley	1,870	38.2	−10.4
Total formal votes		4,892	97.9	−0.7
Informal votes		104	2.1	+0.7
Turnout		4,996	88.5	+6.7
National hold		Swing	+10.4	

=== Enoggera ===
1920 Queensland state election: Enoggera
Party	Candidate	Votes	%	±%
National	Jim Kerr	4,031	52.4	+3.2
Labor	William Lloyd	3,665	47.6	−3.2
Total formal votes		7,696	99.2	+0.7
Informal votes		58	0.8	−0.7
Turnout		7,754	85.4	−3.2
National gain from Labor		Swing	+3.2	

=== Fassifern ===
1920 Queensland state election: Fassifern
Party	Candidate	Votes	%	±%
Country	Ernest Bell	3,132	67.1	+67.1
Labor	Jack Quinlan	1,534	32.9	−13.8
Total formal votes		4,666	99.6	+0.4
Informal votes		19	0.4	−0.4
Turnout		4,685	88.9	+0.3
Country gain from National		Swing	N/A	

=== Fitzroy ===
1920 Queensland state election: Fitzroy
Party	Candidate	Votes	%	±%
Labor	Harry Hartley	3,383	54.0	0.0
National	Frederick Lodge	2,882	46.0	0.0
Total formal votes		6,265	98.4	+0.2
Informal votes		100	1.6	−0.2
Turnout		6,365	80.5	−2.5
Labor hold		Swing	0.0	

=== Flinders ===
1920 Queensland state election: Flinders
Party	Candidate	Votes	%	±%
Labor	John Mullan	2,590	64.5	−11.2
Northern Country	Eric Huntley	1,423	35.5	+35.5
Total formal votes		4,013	98.9	+0.7
Informal votes		46	1.1	−0.7
Turnout		4,059	49.6	−9.5
Labor hold		Swing	−11.2	

=== Fortitude Valley ===
1920 Queensland state election: Fortitude Valley
Party	Candidate	Votes	%	±%
Labor	Thomas Wilson	3,410	64.2	−1.3
National Labor	James Forde	1,899	35.8	+35.8
Total formal votes		5,302	99.4	0.0
Informal votes		33	0.6	0.0
Turnout		5,342	80.1	−2.3
Labor hold		Swing	−1.3	

=== Gregory ===
1920 Queensland state election: Gregory
Party	Candidate	Votes	%	±%
Labor	George Pollock	2,504	58.9	−11.6
Northern Country	Robert Nowland	1,748	41.1	+41.1
Total formal votes		4,252	98.6	+1.4
Informal votes		62	1.4	−1.4
Turnout		4,314	57.9	+0.6
Labor hold		Swing	−11.6	

=== Gympie ===
1920 Queensland state election: Gympie
Party	Candidate	Votes	%	±%
Labor	Thomas Dunstan	1,863	54.8	−1.9
National	James MacDonnell	1,539	45.2	+1.9
Total formal votes		3,402	98.8	−0.2
Informal votes		42	1.2	+0.2
Turnout		3,444	87.8	+0.6
Labor hold		Swing	−1.9	

=== Herbert ===
1920 Queensland state election: Herbert
Party	Candidate	Votes	%	±%
Labor	Percy Pease	2,869	54.6	−8.6
Northern Country	Hedley Gelston	2,387	45.5	+45.5
Total formal votes		5,256	98.1	−0.9
Informal votes		102	1.9	+0.9
Turnout		5,358	87.8	+0.6
Labor hold		Swing	−8.6	

=== Ipswich ===
1920 Queensland state election: Ipswich
Party	Candidate	Votes	%	±%
Labor	David Gledson	3,336	56.4	−0.1
National	James Bottomley	2,576	43.6	+0.1
Total formal votes		5,912	99.2	+0.5
Informal votes		48	0.8	−0.5
Turnout		5,960	88.8	+0.4
Labor hold		Swing	−0.1	

=== Ithaca ===
1920 Queensland state election: Ithaca
Party	Candidate	Votes	%	±%
Labor	John Gilday	3,164	52.3	−3.2
National Labor	John Morton	2,885	47.7	+47.7
Total formal votes		6,049	99.0	+1.0
Informal votes		61	1.0	−1.0
Turnout		6,111	76.3	−9.3
Labor hold		Swing	−3.2	

=== Kennedy ===
1920 Queensland state election: Kennedy
Party	Candidate	Votes	%	±%
Northern Country	John Jones	1,102	52.0	+52.0
Labor	James O'Sullivan	1,016	48.0	−13.1
Total formal votes		2,118	98.2	+0.1
Informal votes		38	1.8	−0.1
Turnout		2,156	76.5	0.0
Northern Country gain from Labor		Swing	N/A	

=== Keppel ===
1920 Queensland state election: Keppel
Party	Candidate	Votes	%	±%
Labor	James Larcombe	2,200	54.3	−3.5
National	Robert Hartley	1,851	45.7	+3.5
Total formal votes		4,051	99.1	+0.5
Informal votes		38	0.9	−0.5
Turnout		4,089	83.4	−0.1
Labor hold		Swing	−3.5	

=== Kurilpa ===
1920 Queensland state election: Kurilpa
Party	Candidate	Votes	%	±%
National	James Fry	3,342	56.0	+5.3
Labor	John Pringle	2,626	44.0	−5.3
Total formal votes		5,968	99.0	0.0
Informal votes		58	1.0	0.0
Turnout		6,026	85.4	+1.0
National hold		Swing	+5.3	

=== Leichhardt ===
1920 Queensland state election: Leichhardt
Party	Candidate	Votes	%	±%
Labor	Tom Foley	2,902	60.2	−8.5
Country	Charles Kingston	1,922	39.8	+39.8
Total formal votes		4,824	99.0	−0.1
Informal votes		48	1.0	+0.1
Turnout		4,872	71.8	−3.5
Labor hold		Swing	−8.5	

=== Lockyer ===
1920 Queensland state election: Lockyer
Party	Candidate	Votes	%	±%
Country	George Logan	1,731	53.3	+53.3
Labor	Cuthbert Butler	1,519	46.7	−5.8
Total formal votes		3,250	99.5	−0.2
Informal votes		16	0.5	+0.2
Turnout		3,266	89.7	+3.4
Country gain from Labor		Swing	N/A	

=== Logan ===
1920 Queensland state election: Logan
Party	Candidate	Votes	%	±%
Labor	Dick Brown	2,648	39.9	−13.2
National	Reginald King	2,466	37.2	−9.7
Country	Alfred James	1,517	22.9	+22.9
Total formal votes		6,631	99.0	+0.3
Informal votes		70	1.0	−0.3
Turnout		6,701	78.6	−7.8
Two-party-preferred result
National	Reginald King	3,674	57.5	+10.6
Labor	Dick Brown	2,720	42.5	−10.6
National gain from Labor		Swing	+10.6	

=== Mackay ===
1920 Queensland state election: Mackay
Party	Candidate	Votes	%	±%
Labor	William Forgan Smith	2,630	53.2	−2.8
Northern Country	James McLaren	1,907	38.5	+38.5
Independent Country	Charles Clarke	411	8.3	+8.3
Total formal votes		4,948	98.9	+0.1
Informal votes		57	1.1	−0.1
Turnout		5,005	80.3	+2.5
Labor hold		Swing	N/A	

=== Maranoa ===
1920 Queensland state election: Maranoa
Party	Candidate	Votes	%	±%
Labor	Charles Conroy	2,416	50.7	−8.4
Country	Thomas Spencer	2,350	49.3	+49.3
Total formal votes		4,766	99.3	+0.3
Informal votes		31	0.7	−0.3
Turnout		4,797	80.7	+2.5
Labor gain from National		Swing	−8.4	

=== Maree ===
1920 Queensland state election: Maree
Party	Candidate	Votes	%	±%
Labor	William Bertram	3,164	51.2	−1.9
National	Field Evans Smith	3,015	48.8	+2.9
Total formal votes		6,179	99.8	+0.8
Informal votes		13	0.2	−0.8
Turnout		6,192	84.4	+0.2
Labor hold		Swing	−2.4	

=== Maryborough ===
1920 Queensland state election: Maryborough
Party	Candidate	Votes	%	±%
Labor	David Weir	2,658	58.1	−3.7
National	James Hatton	1,916	41.9	+3.7
Total formal votes		4,574	99.2	0.0
Informal votes		36	0.8	0.0
Turnout		4,610	88.9	+1.3
Labor hold		Swing	−3.7	

=== Merthyr ===
1920 Queensland state election: Merthyr
Party	Candidate	Votes	%	±%
National	Peter MacGregor	3,213	51.6	+4.3
Labor	Peter McLachlan	3,013	48.4	−4.3
Total formal votes		6,226	99.5	+0.1
Informal votes		28	0.5	−0.1
Turnout		6,254	72.0	−11.6
National gain from Labor		Swing	+4.3	

=== Mirani ===
1920 Queensland state election: Mirani
Party	Candidate	Votes	%	±%
Northern Country	Edward Swayne	2,293	55.7	+2.1
Labor	Maurice Hynes	1,820	44.3	−2.1
Total formal votes		4,113	99.1	+0.5
Informal votes		37	0.9	−0.5
Northern Country gain from National		Swing	N/A	

=== Mitchell ===
1920 Queensland state election: Mitchell
Party	Candidate	Votes	%	±%
Labor	John Payne	unopposed		
Labor hold		Swing		

=== Mount Morgan ===
1920 Queensland state election: Mount Morgan
Party	Candidate	Votes	%	±%
Labor	James Stopford	2,528	65.3	−0.3
National	Frederick McCarthy	1,341	34.7	+0.3
Total formal votes		3,869	99.4	+15.2
Informal votes		22	0.6	−15.2
Turnout		3,891	81.6	−2.6
Labor hold		Swing	−0.3	

=== Mundingburra ===
1920 Queensland state election: Mundingburra
Party	Candidate	Votes	%	±%
Labor	John Dash	3,714	60.0	−10.1
Northern Country	John Clegg	2,473	40.0	+10.1
Total formal votes		6,187	98.2	−0.6
Informal votes		115	1.8	+0.6
Turnout		6,302	82.3	+0.2
Labor hold		Swing	−10.1	

=== Murilla ===
1920 Queensland state election: Murilla
Party	Candidate	Votes	%	±%
Country	Godfrey Morgan	2,704	57.7	+3.5
Labor	Jack MacGinley	1,984	42.3	−3.5
Total formal votes		4,688	99.1	+0.6
Informal votes		43	0.9	−0.6
Turnout		4,731	76.4	+2.0
Country gain from National		Swing	N/A	

=== Murrumba ===
1920 Queensland state election: Murrumba
Party	Candidate	Votes	%	±%
Country	Richard Warren	3,598	47.5	+47.5
National	George Pritchard	2,473	32.6	−33.5
Labor	John Forde	1,507	19.9	−14.0
Total formal votes		7,578	98.8	+0.3
Informal votes		94	1.2	−0.3
Turnout		7,672	76.2	−5.2
Two-candidate-preferred result
Country	Richard Warren	2,803	59.8	+59.8
National	George Pritchard	2,559	40.2	−25.9
Country gain from National		Swing	N/A	

=== Musgrave ===
1920 Queensland state election: Musgrave
Party	Candidate	Votes	%	±%
Country	Henry Cattermull	1,979	58.1	+58.1
Labor	Thomas Armfield	1,429	41.9	−12.7
Total formal votes		3,408	99.5	+0.1
Informal votes		17	+0.5	−0.1
Turnout		3,425	85.4	−0.4
Country gain from Labor		Swing	N/A	

=== Nanango ===
1920 Queensland state election: Nanango
Party	Candidate	Votes	%	±%
Independent Country	Jim Edwards	2,740	37.9	+37.9
Country	Robert Hodge	2,564	35.5	+35.5
Labor	Robert Wallace	1,917	26.6	−18.1
Total formal votes		7,221	98.0	−0.9
Informal votes		148	2.0	+0.9
Turnout		7,369	83.1	+2.5
Two-candidate-preferred result
Independent Country	Jim Edwards	2,969	52.3	+52.3
Country	Robert Hodge	2,711	47.7	+47.7
Independent Country gain from National		Swing	N/A	

=== Normanby ===
1920 Queensland state election: Normanby
Party	Candidate	Votes	%	±%
Labor	Jens Peterson	2,652	56.6	−3.0
National	Alexander Cameron	2,030	43.4	+3.0
Total formal votes		4,682	97.8	−1.3
Informal votes		106	2.2	+1.3
Turnout		4,788	80.0	+2.7
Labor hold		Swing	−3.0	

=== Nundah ===
1920 Queensland state election: Nundah
Party	Candidate	Votes	%	±%
National	Hubert Sizer	5,727	62.5	+4.9
Labor	George Robbins	3,430	37.5	−4.9
Total formal votes		9,157	99.4	+0.1
Informal votes		51	0.6	−0.1
Turnout		9,208	84.6	−0.1
National hold		Swing	+4.9	

=== Oxley ===
1920 Queensland state election: Oxley
Party	Candidate	Votes	%	±%
National	Cecil Elphinstone	4,919	58.9	+6.7
Labor	John Reid	3,428	41.1	−6.7
Total formal votes		8,347	99.5	0.0
Informal votes		45	0.5	0.0
Turnout		8,392	87.0	0.0
National hold		Swing	+6.7	

=== Paddington ===
1920 Queensland state election: Paddington
Party	Candidate	Votes	%	±%
Labor	John Fihelly	3,717	61.6	+0.7
National Labor	Norm McFadden	2,317	38.4	+38.4
Total formal votes		6,034	99.0	+0.5
Informal votes		58	1.0	−0.5
Turnout		6,092	77.4	−2.3
Labor hold		Swing	N/A	

==== By-elections ====
- This by-election was caused by the resignation of John Fihelly. It was held on 11 March 1922.

1922 Paddington state by-election
Party	Candidate	Votes	%	±%
Labor	Alfred Jones	3,231	58.2	−3.4
National	John Fisher	2,319	41.8	+3.4
Total formal votes		5,550	99.4	+0.4
Informal votes		35	0.6	−0.4
Turnout		5,585		
Labor hold		Swing	−3.4	

=== Pittsworth ===
1920 Queensland state election: Pittsworth
Party	Candidate	Votes	%	±%
Country	Cecil Roberts	2,188	57.8	+57.8
Independent	Percy Bayley	1,596	42.2	+14.4
Total formal votes		3,784	99.3	+0.6
Informal votes		28	0.7	−0.6
Turnout		3,812	85.7	+0.6
Country gain from Independent		Swing	N/A	

=== Port Curtis ===
1920 Queensland state election: Port Curtis
Party	Candidate	Votes	%	±%
National	John Fletcher	2,157	52.5	+5.4
Labor	George Carter	1,953	47.5	−5.4
Total formal votes		4,110	99.6	+0.3
Informal votes		15	0.4	−0.3
Turnout		4,125	87.0	+1.3
National gain from Labor		Swing	+5.4	

=== Queenton ===
1920 Queensland state election: Queenton
Party	Candidate	Votes	%	±%
Labor	Vern Winstanley	1,295	65.0	+1.5
National	Herbert Hall	697	35.0	+21.9
Total formal votes		1,992	98.3	+0.8
Informal votes		35	1.7	−0.8
Turnout		2,027	76.7	−4.3
Labor hold		Swing	N/A	

=== Rockhampton ===
1920 Queensland state election: Rockhampton
Party	Candidate	Votes	%	±%
Labor	Frank Forde	2,997	65.6	−2.7
National	Theodore Kingel	1,572	34.4	+2.7
Total formal votes		4,569	99.0	+0.8
Informal votes		45	1.0	−0.8
Turnout		4,614	76.4	+0.4
Labor hold		Swing	−2.7	

==== By-election ====
- This by-election was caused by the resignation of Frank Forde, who entered Federal politics. It was held on 17 February 1923.

1923 Rockhampton state by-election
Party	Candidate	Votes	%	±%
Labor	George Farrell	2,587	60.4	−5.2
National	William Charlton	1,638	38.2	+3.8
Independent	Charles Iredale	62	1.4	+1.4
Total formal votes		4,287	99.3	+0.3
Informal votes		31	0.7	−0.3
Turnout		4,318		
Labor hold		Swing	N/A	

=== Rosewood ===
1920 Queensland state election: Rosewood
Party	Candidate	Votes	%	±%
Labor	William Cooper	2,063	51.6	−13.2
Country	Arthur Ogg	1,936	48.4	+48.4
Total formal votes		3,999	99.2	+0.7
Informal votes		33	0.8	−0.7
Turnout		4,032	87.4	+1.4
Labor hold		Swing	−13.2	

=== South Brisbane ===
1920 Queensland state election: South Brisbane
Party	Candidate	Votes	%	±%
Labor	Myles Ferricks	3,063	51.6	−3.4
National	James Davey	2,877	48.4	+3.4
Total formal votes		5,940	98.3	−0.1
Informal votes		102	1.7	+0.1
Turnout		6,042	79.0	−1.6
Labor hold		Swing	−3.4	

=== Stanley ===
1920 Queensland state election: Stanley
Party	Candidate	Votes	%	±%
Country	Frederick Nott	2,072	44.9	+44.9
Labor	William Delaney	1,718	37.3	−9.2
Independent	Duncan Watson	819	17.8	+17.8
Total formal votes		4,609	99.0	−0.3
Informal votes		45	1.0	+0.3
Turnout		4,654	82.4	+2.1
Two-party-preferred result
Country	Frederick Nott	2,752	61.1	+61.1
Labor	William Delaney	1,755	38.9	−7.6
Country gain from National		Swing	N/A	

=== Toombul ===
1920 Queensland state election: Toombul
Party	Candidate	Votes	%	±%
National	Andrew Petrie	5,447	64.8	+4.3
Labor	John Watkins	2,957	35.2	−4.3
Total formal votes		8,404	99.0	−0.2
Informal votes		83	1.0	+0.2
Turnout		8,487	83.4	+8.2
National hold		Swing	+4.3	

=== Toowong ===
1920 Queensland state election: Toowong
Party	Candidate	Votes	%	±%
National	James Maxwell	5,551	71.9	+4.2
Labor	William McCosker	2,164	28.1	−4.2
Total formal votes		7,715	99.4	−0.1
Informal votes		48	0.6	+0.1
Turnout		7,763	85.4	+0.5
National hold		Swing	+4.2	

=== Toowoomba ===
1920 Queensland state election: Toowoomba
Party	Candidate	Votes	%	±%
Labor	Frank Brennan	2,099	46.2	−7.9
National	James Tolmie	1,464	32.2	−13.7
Independent	Alexander Dark	976	21.5	+21.5
Total formal votes		4,539	98.7	−0.1
Informal votes		61	1.3	+0.1
Turnout		4,600	85.7	+5.2
Two-party-preferred result
Labor	Frank Brennan	2,161	50.3	−3.8
National	James Tolmie	2,133	49.7	+3.8
Labor hold		Swing	−3.8	

=== Townsville ===
1920 Queensland state election: Townsville
Party	Candidate	Votes	%	±%
Northern Country	William Green	2,901	55.0	+55.0
Labor	Daniel Ryan	2,376	45.0	−9.1
Total formal votes		5,277	98.4	+0.2
Informal votes		88	1.6	−0.2
Turnout		5,365	80.0	+2.9
Northern Country gain from Labor		Swing	N/A	

=== Warrego ===
1920 Queensland state election: Warrego
Party	Candidate	Votes	%	±%
Labor	Harry Coyne	2,507	68.7	−5.6
Country	Herbert Yeates	1,144	31.3	+31.3
Total formal votes		3,651	97.7	0.0
Informal votes		86	2.3	0.0
Turnout		3,737	56.0	−5.0
Labor hold		Swing	−5.6	

=== Warwick ===
1920 Queensland state election: Warwick
Party	Candidate	Votes	%	±%
National	George Barnes	2,448	55.0	+1.0
Labor	Donald Beatson	2,006	45.0	−1.0
Total formal votes		4,454	99.2	−0.1
Informal votes		35	0.8	+0.1
Turnout		4,489	85.6	+1.8
National hold		Swing	+1.0	

=== Wide Bay ===
1920 Queensland state election: Wide Bay
Party	Candidate	Votes	%	±%
Country	Harry Clayton	2,485	52.8	+52.8
Labor	Andrew Thompson	2,223	47.2	−5.5
Total formal votes		4,708	99.3	+0.2
Informal votes		31	0.7	−0.2
Turnout		4,739	89.9	+1.2
Country gain from Labor		Swing	N/A	

=== Windsor ===
1920 Queensland state election: Windsor
Party	Candidate	Votes	%	±%
National	Charles Taylor	5,567	54.6	+4.1
Labor	Herbert McPhail	4,627	45.4	−4.1
Total formal votes		10,194	99.2	−0.4
Informal votes		79	0.8	+0.4
Turnout		10,273	87.1	−0.5
National hold		Swing	+4.1	

== See also ==
- 1920 Queensland state election
- Candidates of the Queensland state election, 1920
- Members of the Queensland Legislative Assembly, 1920-1923
