= Candidates of the 1920 Queensland state election =

This is a list of candidates who stood for the 1920 state election in Queensland, Australia.The election was held on 9 October 1920.

Since the previous election in 1918, the Country Party had formed, and had been joined by many sitting National Party MPs. Four parties – the National, Country, Northern Country and National Labor parties – operated as a coalition in this election.

== By-elections ==
- On 20 December 1919, Frank Bulcock (Labor) was elected to succeed T. J. Ryan (Labor), who had resigned on 14 October 1919, as the member for Barcoo.
- On 20 December 1919, Tom Foley (Labor) was elected to succeed Herbert Hardacre (Labor), who had resigned on 14 October 1919, as the member for Leichhardt.
- On 20 December 1919, Thomas Spencer (National) was elected to succeed John McEwan Hunter (Labor), who had died on 22 October 1919, as the member for Maranoa.
- On 10 April 1920, Percy Pease (Labor) was elected to succeed William Lennon (Labor), who had resigned on 16 January 1920, as the member for Herbert.

== Retiring members ==
- Note: Mundingburra Labor MLA Thomas Foley had died prior to the election; no by-election was held.

=== Labor ===
- Edgar Free MLA (South Brisbane)

=== Nationalist ===
- Donald Gunn MLA (Carnarvon)
- Edward Macartney MLA (Toowong)
- Henry Somerset MLA (Stanley)

=== Independent ===
- Francis Grayson MLA (Cunningham)

== Candidates ==
Sitting members at the time of the election are shown in bold text.

Electorate	Held by	Labor candidate	Coalition candidate	Other candidates
Albert	National	Richard Holden	**John Appel** (CP)	
Aubigny	National	William Brady	**Arthur Moore** (CP)	
Balonne	Labor	**Edward Land**	Richard Nantes (CP)	
Barcoo	Labor	**Frank Bulcock**	James Cullen (NCP)	
Bowen	Labor	**Charles Collins**	John Leahy (NCP)	
Bremer	Labor	**Frank Cooper**	Alfred Stephenson (Nat)	Albert Welsby (Indust)
Brisbane	Labor	**Mick Kirwan**	Patrick Currie (Nat)	
Bulimba	National	George Marriott	**Walter Barnes** (Nat)	
Bundaberg	Labor	**George Barber**	John Forgan (CP)	
Buranda	Labor	**John Huxham**	Alfred Faulkner (Nat)	
Burke	Labor	**Darby Riordan**	John Williamson (NCP)	
Burnett	National	Francis Hill	**Bernard Corser** (CP)	
Burrum	Labor	**Albert Whitford**	William Brand (CP)	
Cairns	Labor	**William McCormack**	Charles Hives (NCP)	
Carnarvon	National	Alfred Jones	Edward Costello (CP)	
Charters Towers	Labor	**William Wellington**	David Guthrie (NCP)	
Chillagoe	Labor	**Ted Theodore**	John Egerton (NCP)	
Cook	Labor	**Henry Ryan**	Frederick Craig (NCP)	
Cooroora	National		**Harry Walker** (CP)	
Cunningham	Independent		William Deacon (CP)	
Dalby	National	James Connolly	**William Vowles** (CP)	
Drayton	National	Lister Hopkins	**William Bebbington** (CP)	
Eacham	Labor	**William Gillies**		James McCarthy (Ind CP)
East Toowoomba	National	John Mattingley	**Robert Roberts** (Nat)	
Enoggera	Labor	**William Lloyd**	Jim Kerr (Nat)	
Fassifern	National	Jack Quinlan	**Ernest Bell** (CP)	
Fitzroy	Labor	**Harry Hartley**	Frederick Lodge (Nat)	
Flinders	Labor	**John Mullan**	Eric Huntley (NCP)	
Fortitude Valley	Labor	**Thomas Wilson**	James Forde (NLP)	
Gregory	Labor	**George Pollock**	Robert Nowland (NCP)	
Gympie	Labor	**Thomas Dunstan**	James MacDonnell (Nat)	
Herbert	Labor	**Percy Pease**	Hedley Gelston (NCP)	
Ipswich	Labor	**David Gledson**	James Bottomley (Nat)	
Ithaca	Labor	**John Gilday**	John Morton (NLP)	
Kennedy	Labor	**James O'Sullivan**	John Jones (NCP)	
Keppel	Labor	**James Larcombe**	Robert Hartley (Nat)	
Kurilpa	National	John Pringle	**James Fry** (Nat)	
Leichhardt	Labor	**Tom Foley**	Charles Kingston (CP)	
Lockyer	Labor	**Cuthbert Butler**	George Logan (CP)	
Logan	Labor	Dick Brown	**Alfred James** (CP); Reginald King* (Nat)	
Mackay	Labor	**William Forgan Smith**	James McLaren (NCP)	Charles Clarke (Ind CP)
Maranoa	National	Charles Conroy	**Thomas Spencer** (CP)	
Maree	Labor	**William Bertram**	Field Evans Smith (Nat)	
Maryborough	Labor	**David Weir**	James Hatton (Nat)	
Merthyr	Labor	**Peter McLachlan**	Peter MacGregor (Nat)	
Mirani	National	Maurice Hynes	**Edward Swayne** (NCP)	
Mitchell	Labor	**John Payne**		
Mount Morgan	Labor	**James Stopford**	Frederick McCarthy (Nat)	
Mundingburra	Labor	John Dash	John Clegg (NCP)	
Murilla	National	Jack MacGinley	**Godfrey Morgan** (CP)	
Murrumba	National	John Forde	George Pritchard (Nat); **Richard Warren*** (CP)	
Musgrave	Labor	**Thomas Armfield**	Henry Cattermull (CP)	
Nanango	National	Robert Wallace	**Robert Hodge** (CP)	Jim Edwards (Ind CP)
Normanby	Labor	**Jens Peterson**	Alexander Cameron (Nat)	
Nundah	National	George Robbins	**Hubert Sizer** (Nat)	
Oxley	National	John Reid	**Cecil Elphinstone** (Nat)	
Paddington	Labor	**John Fihelly**	Norm McFadden (NLP)	
Pittsworth	Independent		Cecil Roberts (CP)	**Percy Bayley** (Ind)
Port Curtis	Labor	**George Carter**	John Fletcher (Nat)	
Queenton	Labor	**Vern Winstanley**	Herbert Hall (Nat)	
Rockhampton	Labor	**Frank Forde**	Theodore Kingel (Nat)	
Rosewood	Labor	**William Cooper**	Arthur Ogg (CP)	
South Brisbane	Labor	Myles Ferricks	James Davey (Nat)	
Stanley	National	William Delaney	Frederick Nott (CP)	Duncan Watson (Ind)
Toombul	National	John Watkins	**Andrew Petrie** (Nat)	
Toowong	National	William McCosker	James Maxwell (Nat)	
Toowoomba	Labor	**Frank Brennan**	James Tolmie (Nat)	Alexander Dark (Ind)
Townsville	Labor	**Daniel Ryan**	William Green (NCP)	
Warrego	Labor	**Harry Coyne**	Herbert Yeates (CP)	
Warwick	National	Donald Beatson	**George Barnes** (Nat)	
Wide Bay	Labor	**Andrew Thompson**	Harry Clayton (CP)	
Windsor	National	Herbert McPhail	**Charles Taylor** (Nat)	

== See also ==
- 1923 Queensland state election
- Members of the Queensland Legislative Assembly, 1918–1920
- Members of the Queensland Legislative Assembly, 1920–1923
- List of political parties in Australia
