= Results of the 1923 Queensland state election =

Queensland state election, 12 May 1923 Legislative Assembly << 1920–1926 >>
Enrolled voters	449,087^{[1]}				
Votes cast	369,267		Turnout	82.23	+2.30
Informal votes	4,311		Informal	1.17	+0.16
Summary of votes by party
Party	Primary votes	%	Swing	Seats	Change
Labor	175,659	48.13	+0.36	43	+ 5
United	131,810	36.12	+10.39	16	+ 3
Country	39,534	10.83	–6.23	13	– 4
Ind. Country	4,732	1.30	–0.42	0	– 1
Independent	13,221	3.62	+2.83	0	± 0
Others			–6.94		– 3
Total	364,956			72	

This is a list of electoral district results for the 1923 Queensland state election.

At the time, the voting system in Queensland was based on contingency voting, which was similar to the modern optional preferential voting system. In electorates with 3 or more candidates, preferences were not distributed if a candidate received more than 50% of the primary vote.

If none received more than 50%, all except the top two candidates were eliminated from the count and their preferences distributed between the two leaders, with the one receiving the most votes declared the winner.

== Results by electoral district ==
=== Albert ===
1923 Queensland state election: Albert
Party	Candidate	Votes	%	±%
United	John Appel	unopposed		
Member changed to United from Country		Swing	N/A	

=== Aubigny ===
1923 Queensland state election: Aubigny
Party	Candidate	Votes	%	±%
Country	Arthur Moore	3,318	59.1	−3.1
Labor	Charles Gould	2,294	40.9	+3.1
Total formal votes		5,612	99.1	−0.4
Informal votes		51	0.9	+0.4
Turnout		5,663	87.7	+0.7
Country hold		Swing	−3.1	

=== Balonne ===
1923 Queensland state election: Balonne
Party	Candidate	Votes	%	±%
Labor	Edward Land	2,189	62.6	+3.4
Country	Richard Nates	1,306	37.4	−3.4
Total formal votes		3,495	98.9	−0.4
Informal votes		37	1.1	+0.4
Turnout		3,532	66.8	+5.1
Labor hold		Swing	+3.4	

=== Barcoo ===
1923 Queensland state election: Barcoo
Party	Candidate	Votes	%	±%
Labor	Frank Bulcock	unopposed		
Labor hold		Swing		

=== Bowen ===
1923 Queensland state election: Bowen
Party	Candidate	Votes	%	±%
Labor	Charles Collins	3,069	63.0	
United	Frank Ferguson	1,800	37.0	
Total formal votes		4,869	99.2	
Informal votes		40	0.8	
Turnout		4,909	77.3	
Labor hold		Swing	N/A	

=== Bremer ===
1923 Queensland state election: Bremer
Party	Candidate	Votes	%	±%
Labor	Frank Cooper	3,086	55.6	−5.9
United	Andrew Wright	2,417	43.5	+8.7
Independent	John Budd	51	0.9	+0.9
Total formal votes		5,554	98.5	−0.2
Informal votes		86	1.5	+0.2
Turnout		5,640	92.6	+0.2
Labor hold		Swing	N/A	

=== Brisbane ===
1923 Queensland state election: Brisbane
Party	Candidate	Votes	%	±%
Labor	Mick Kirwan	3,099	59.8	+5.8
United	James Crawford	2,087	40.2	−5.8
Total formal votes		5,186	99.0	+0.5
Informal votes		53	1.0	−0.5
Turnout		5,239	74.0	+5.0
Labor hold		Swing	+5.8	

=== Bulimba ===
1923 Queensland state election: Bulimba
Party	Candidate	Votes	%	±%
Labor	Harry Wright	3,956	53.8	+9.5
United	Duncan Watson	3,298	44.9	−10.8
Independent	Thomas Andrews	94	1.3	+1.3
Total formal votes		7,348	99.3	+0.1
Informal votes		49	0.7	−0.1
Turnout		7,397	84.2	+7.2
Labor gain from United		Swing	N/A	

=== Bundaberg ===
1923 Queensland state election: Bundaberg
Party	Candidate	Votes	%	±%
Labor	George Barber	3,777	59.0	+1.6
Country	Henry Cattermull	2,628	41.0	−1.6
Total formal votes		6,405	99.3	+0.5
Informal votes		48	0.7	−0.5
Turnout		6,453	87.2	+13.4
Labor hold		Swing	+1.6	

=== Buranda ===
1923 Queensland state election: Buranda
Party	Candidate	Votes	%	±%
Labor	John Huxham	3,662	56.6	+0.7
United	Charles Edwards	2,806	43.4	−0.7
Total formal votes		6,468	99.4	+0.1
Informal votes		42	0.6	−0.1
Turnout		6,510	89.4	+4.5
Labor hold		Swing	+0.7	

==== By-election ====
- This by-election was caused by the appointment of John Huxham as Agent-General of Queensland in London. It was held on 16 August 1924.

1924 Buranda state by-election
Party	Candidate	Votes	%	±%
Labor	Ted Hanson	3,379	56.6	0.0
United	James Davey	2,578	43.4	0.0
Total formal votes		5,999	99.3	−0.1
Informal votes		45	0.7	+0.1
Turnout		6,044		
Labor hold		Swing	0.0	

=== Burke ===
1923 Queensland state election: Burke
Party	Candidate	Votes	%	±%
Labor	Darby Riordan	1,943	61.1	−5.5
United	Campbell Murray	1,235	38.9	+5.5
Total formal votes		3,178	96.0	−1.0
Informal votes		133	4.0	+1.0
Turnout		3,311	62.8	−6.8
Labor hold		Swing	−5.5	

=== Burnett ===
1923 Queensland state election: Burnett
Party	Candidate	Votes	%	±%
Country	Bernard Corser	3,114	57.8	−8.4
Labor	William McMahon	2,144	39.8	+6.0
Independent	Fred Saidy	133	2.5	+2.5
Total formal votes		5,391	98.8	−0.5
Informal votes		66	1.2	+0.5
Turnout		5,457	86.9	+2.9
Country hold		Swing	N/A	

=== Burrum ===
1923 Queensland state election: Burrum
Party	Candidate	Votes	%	±%
Country	William Brand	2,860	50.6	−7.1
Labor	Montague Parker	2,796	49.4	+7.1
Total formal votes		5,656	99.3	−0.2
Informal votes		37	0.7	+0.2
Turnout		5,693	83.8	+0.6
Country hold		Swing	−7.1	

=== Cairns ===
1923 Queensland state election: Cairns
Party	Candidate	Votes	%	±%
Labor	William McCormack	3,106	58.8	+4.1
United	William Griffin	2,173	41.2	+41.2
Total formal votes		5,279	98.3	−0.5
Informal votes		89	1.7	+0.5
Turnout		5,368	82.5	+3.7
Labor hold		Swing	+4.1	

=== Carnarvon ===
1923 Queensland state election: Carnarvon
Party	Candidate	Votes	%	±%
Country	Edward Costello	3,099	53.2	−1.0
Labor	Thomas Brown	2,721	46.8	+1.0
Total formal votes		5,820	99.6	−0.2
Informal votes		25	0.4	+0.2
Turnout		5,845	81.0	−1.5
Country hold		Swing	−1.0	

=== Charters Towers ===
1923 Queensland state election: Charters Towers
Party	Candidate	Votes	%	±%
Labor	William Wellington	2,487	61.7	+7.0
United	Frank Wood	1,545	38.3	+38.3
Total formal votes		4,032	98.9	−0.6
Informal votes		44	1.1	+0.6
Turnout		4,076	85.7	+8.4
Labor hold		Swing	+7.0	

=== Chillagoe ===
1923 Queensland state election: Chillagoe
Party	Candidate	Votes	%	±%
Labor	Ted Theodore	2,459	64.3	−13.5
United	Ernest Atherton	1,083	28.3	+6.1
Independent	Thomas Taylor	283	7.4	+7.4
Total formal votes		3,825	97.8	+0.1
Informal votes		84	2.2	−0.1
Turnout		3,909	81.0	−0.3
Labor hold		Swing	N/A	

==== By-election ====
- This by-election was caused by the resignation of Ted Theodore, who entered Federal politics. It was held on 16 January 1926.

1926 Chillagoe state by-election
Party	Candidate	Votes	%	±%
Labor	John O'Keefe	2,023	61.7	−2.3
CPNP	W. Leale	1,256	38.3	+2.3
Total formal votes		3,279		
Informal votes				
Turnout				
Labor hold		Swing	−2.3	

=== Cook ===
1923 Queensland state election: Cook
Party	Candidate	Votes	%	±%
Labor	Harry Ryan	1,888	51.8	−4.1
United	Thomas Kilpatrick	1,760	48.2	+4.1
Total formal votes		3,648	99.0	+0.6
Informal votes		36	1.0	−0.6
Turnout		3,684	76.9	+4.2
Labor hold		Swing	−4.1	

=== Cooroora ===
1923 Queensland state election: Cooroora
Party	Candidate	Votes	%	±%
Country	Harry Walker	unopposed		
Country hold		Swing		

=== Cunningham ===
1923 Queensland state election: Cunningham
Party	Candidate	Votes	%	±%
Country	William Deacon	2,481	42.8	−57.2
Labor	Denis Hannay	2,094	36.1	+36.1
Independent Country	Cecil Roberts	1,229	21.2	+21.2
Total formal votes		5,804	97.8	
Informal votes		128	2.2	
Turnout		5,932	89.0	
Two-party-preferred result
Country	William Deacon	3,493	61.7	−38.3
Labor	Denis Hannay	2,166	38.3	+38.3
Country hold		Swing	N/A	

=== Dalby ===
1923 Queensland state election: Dalby
Party	Candidate	Votes	%	±%
Country	William Vowles	2,679	48.8	−13.7
Labor	Hugh McAnally	2,069	37.7	+0.2
Independent Country	N C Hooper	743	13.5	+13.5
Total formal votes		5,491	97.9	−1.4
Informal votes		120	2.1	+1.4
Turnout		5,611	84.7	+0.8
Two-party-preferred result
Country	William Vowles	3,086	58.1	−4.4
Labor	Hugh McAnally	2,221	41.9	+4.4
Country hold		Swing	−4.4	

=== Eacham ===
1923 Queensland state election: Eacham
Party	Candidate	Votes	%	±%
Labor	William Gillies	unopposed		
Labor hold		Swing		

==== By-election ====
- This by-election was caused by the resignation of William Gillies. It was held on 16 January 1926.

1926 Eacham state by-election
Party	Candidate	Votes	%	±%
Labor	Cornelius Ryan	2,433	51.1	−48.9
CPNP	Edward Heale	2,327	48.9	+48.9
Total formal votes		4,760	99.2	
Informal votes		40	0.8	
Turnout		4,800		
Labor hold		Swing	N/A	

=== East Toowoomba ===
1923 Queensland state election: East Toowoomba
Party	Candidate	Votes	%	±%
United	Robert Roberts	3,651	61.6	−0.2
Labor	Thomas Armfield	2,275	38.4	+0.2
Total formal votes		5,926	99.1	+1.2
Informal votes		52	0.9	−1.2
Turnout		5,978	77.9	−10.6
United hold		Swing	−0.2	

=== Enoggera ===
1923 Queensland state election: Enoggera
Party	Candidate	Votes	%	±%
United	Jim Kerr	4,165	58.7	+6.3
Labor	John Valentine	2,930	41.3	−6.3
Total formal votes		7,095	99.6	+0.4
Informal votes		25	0.4	−0.4
Turnout		7,120	83.7	−1.7
United hold		Swing	+6.3	

=== Fassifern ===
1923 Queensland state election: Fassifern
Party	Candidate	Votes	%	±%
United	Ernest Bell	3,025	52.2	−14.9
Independent	John Hardcastle	2,767	47.8	+47.8
Total formal votes		5,792	98.8	−0.8
Informal votes		72	1.2	+0.8
Turnout		5,792	82.5	−6.4
United hold		Swing	N/A	

=== Fitzroy ===
1923 Queensland state election: Fitzroy
Party	Candidate	Votes	%	±%
Labor	Harry Hartley	3,093	52.4	−1.6
United	Hugh Grant	2,805	47.6	+1.6
Total formal votes		5,898	99.0	+0.6
Informal votes		61	1.0	−0.6
Turnout		5,959	81.3	+0.8
Labor hold		Swing	−1.6	

=== Flinders ===
1923 Queensland state election: Flinders
Party	Candidate	Votes	%	±%
Labor	John Mullan	1,193	62.9	−1.6
United	Leonard Nicolson	703	37.1	+37.1
Total formal votes		1,896	99.2	+0.3
Informal votes		16	0.8	−0.3
Turnout		1,912	48.6	−1.0
Labor hold		Swing	N/A	

=== Fortitude Valley ===
1923 Queensland state election: Fortitude Valley
Party	Candidate	Votes	%	±%
Labor	Thomas Wilson	3,726	61.8	−2.4
United	Edwin Fowles	2,307	38.2	+38.2
Total formal votes		6,033	99.3	−0.1
Informal votes		41	0.7	+0.1
Turnout		6,074	85.8	+5.7
Labor hold		Swing	N/A	

=== Gregory ===
1923 Queensland state election: Gregory
Party	Candidate	Votes	%	±%
Labor	George Pollock	2,014	66.8	+7.9
United	Fergus McMaster	1,000	33.2	+33.2
Total formal votes		3,014	98.8	+0.2
Informal votes		38	1.2	−0.2
Turnout		3,052	58.8	+0.9
Labor hold		Swing	N/A	

=== Gympie ===
1923 Queensland state election: Gympie
Party	Candidate	Votes	%	±%
Labor	Thomas Dunstan	2,598	56.1	+1.3
Country	Henry Cowie	2,033	43.9	+43.9
Total formal votes		4,631	99.4	+0.6
Informal votes		27	0.6	−0.6
Turnout		4,658	87.8	0.0
Labor hold		Swing	+1.3	

=== Herbert ===
1923 Queensland state election: Herbert
Party	Candidate	Votes	%	±%
Labor	Percy Pease	3,191	66.5	+11.9
United	John McNamee	1,607	33.5	+33.5
Total formal votes		4,798	98.9	+0.8
Informal votes		54	1.1	−0.8
Turnout		4,852	75.8	−5.2
Labor hold		Swing	+11.9	

=== Ipswich ===
1923 Queensland state election: Ipswich
Party	Candidate	Votes	%	±%
Labor	David Gledson	3,346	54.7	−1.7
United	James Bottomley	2,770	45.3	+1.7
Total formal votes		6,116	99.5	+0.3
Informal votes		31	0.5	−0.3
Turnout		6,147	90.7	+1.9
Labor hold		Swing	−1.7	

=== Ithaca ===
1923 Queensland state election: Ithaca
Party	Candidate	Votes	%	±%
Labor	John Gilday	3,549	54.3	+1.9
United	Robert Archibald	2,991	45.7	−1.9
Total formal votes		6,540	99.1	+0.1
Informal votes		60	0.9	−0.1
Turnout		6,600	90.1	+13.8
Labor hold		Swing	+1.9	

=== Kelvin Grove ===
1923 Queensland state election: Kelvin Grove
Party	Candidate	Votes	%	±%
Labor	William Lloyd	3,343	55.6	
United	John Tait	2,668	44.4	
Total formal votes		6,011	99.5	
Informal votes		33	0.5	
Turnout		6,044	80.7	
Labor hold		Swing		

=== Kennedy ===
1923 Queensland state election: Kennedy
Party	Candidate	Votes	%	±%
Labor	Harry Bruce	2,757	51.4	+3.4
United	John Clegg	2,612	48.6	−3.4
Total formal votes		5,369	98.4	+0.2
Informal votes		88	1.6	−0.2
Turnout		5,457	85.0	+8.5
Labor gain from United		Swing	+3.4	

=== Keppel ===
1923 Queensland state election: Keppel
Party	Candidate	Votes	%	±%
Labor	James Larcombe	3,270	60.7	+6.4
United	Roderick Haylock	2,120	39.3	−6.4
Total formal votes		5,390	99.0	−0.1
Informal votes		54	1.0	+0.1
Turnout		5,444	85.8	+2.4
Labor hold		Swing	+6.4	

=== Kurilpa ===
1923 Queensland state election: Kurilpa
Party	Candidate	Votes	%	±%
United	James Fry	3,310	55.3	−0.7
Labor	William Dobinson	2,675	44.7	+0.7
Total formal votes		5,985	99.1	+0.1
Informal votes		56	0.9	−0.1
Turnout		6,041	88.6	+3.2
United hold		Swing	−0.7	

=== Leichhardt ===
1923 Queensland state election: Leichhardt
Party	Candidate	Votes	%	±%
Labor	Tom Foley	2,521	58.7	−1.5
United	Charles Kingston	1,772	41.3	+1.5
Total formal votes		4,293	99.4	+0.4
Informal votes		25	0.6	−0.4
Turnout		4,318	74.5	+2.7
Labor hold		Swing	−1.5	

=== Lockyer ===
1923 Queensland state election: Lockyer
Party	Candidate	Votes	%	±%
Country	George Logan	2,384	43.4	−9.9
Labor	Albert Kluck	2,257	41.1	−5.6
Independent	William Drayton Armstrong	849	15.5	+15.5
Total formal votes		5,490	99.0	−0.5
Informal votes		56	1.0	+0.5
Turnout		5,546	91.2	+1.5
Two-party-preferred result
Country	George Logan	3,037	56.9	+3.6
Labor	Albert Kluck	2,301	43.1	−3.6
Country hold		Swing	+3.6	

=== Logan ===
1923 Queensland state election: Logan
Party	Candidate	Votes	%	±%
United	Reginald King	3,717	52.6	+15.4
Labor	Thomas Jones	3,345	47.4	+7.5
Total formal votes		7,062	98.9	−0.1
Informal votes		77	1.1	+0.1
Turnout		7,139	88.2	+7.6
United hold		Swing	−4.9	

=== Mackay ===
1923 Queensland state election: Mackay
Party	Candidate	Votes	%	±%
Labor	William Forgan Smith	2,652	57.9	+4.7
United	Lewis Nott	1,931	42.1	+42.1
Total formal votes		4,583	99.7	+0.8
Informal votes		14	0.3	−0.8
Turnout		4,597	79.7	−0.6
Labor hold		Swing	N/A	

=== Maranoa ===
1923 Queensland state election: Maranoa
Party	Candidate	Votes	%	±%
Labor	Charles Conroy	2,416	57.5	+6.8
Independent Country	Frederick Duncombe	1,951	42.5	+42.5
Total formal votes		4,590	99.7	+0.4
Informal votes		14	0.3	−0.4
Turnout		4,604	82.9	+2.2
Labor hold		Swing	N/A	

=== Maree ===
1923 Queensland state election: Maree
Party	Candidate	Votes	%	±%
Labor	William Bertram	3,450	52.9	+1.7
United	John Hetherington	3,073	47.1	−1.7
Total formal votes		6,523	99.6	−0.2
Informal votes		29	0.4	+0.2
Turnout		6,552	88.9	+4.5
Labor hold		Swing	+1.7	

=== Maryborough ===
1923 Queensland state election: Maryborough
Party	Candidate	Votes	%	±%
Labor	David Weir	3,368	59.8	+1.8
United	James Hatton	2,263	40.2	−1.8
Total formal votes		5,631	99.1	−0.1
Informal votes		50	0.9	+0.1
Turnout		5,681	87.6	−1.3
Labor hold		Swing	+1.8	

=== Merthyr ===
1923 Queensland state election: Merthyr
Party	Candidate	Votes	%	±%
Labor	Peter McLachlan	3,509	52.4	+4.0
United	Peter MacGregor	3,189	47.6	−4.0
Total formal votes		6,698	99.6	+0.1
Informal votes		28	0.4	−0.1
Turnout		6,726	79.5	+7.5
Labor gain from United		Swing	+4.0	

=== Mirani ===
1923 Queensland state election: Mirani
Party	Candidate	Votes	%	±%
Country	Edward Swayne	2,670	51.0	−4.7
Labor	Henry Turner	2,563	49.0	+4.7
Total formal votes		5,233	99.3	+0.2
Informal votes		35	0.7	−0.2
Turnout		5,268	82.9	+2.2
Country hold		Swing	−4.7	

=== Mitchell ===
1923 Queensland state election: Mitchell
Party	Candidate	Votes	%	±%
Labor	John Payne	2,368	65.2	−34.8
United	L M Lyons	1,262	34.8	+34.8
Total formal votes		3,630	99.2	
Informal votes		28	0.8	
Turnout		3,658	63.8	
Labor hold		Swing	N/A	

=== Mount Morgan ===
1923 Queensland state election: Mount Morgan
Party	Candidate	Votes	%	±%
Labor	James Stopford	3,282	71.3	+6.0
United	Frederick McCarthy	1,323	28.7	−6.0
Total formal votes		4,605	99.3	−0.1
Informal votes		32	0.7	+0.1
Turnout		4,637	84.8	+3.2
Labor hold		Swing	+6.0	

=== Mundingburra ===
1923 Queensland state election: Mundingburra
Party	Candidate	Votes	%	±%
Labor	John Dash	3,285	64.5	+4.5
United	William Swales	1,810	35.5	+35.5
Total formal votes		5,095	99.0	+0.8
Informal votes		50	1.0	−0.8
Turnout		5,145	90.7	+8.4
Labor hold		Swing	+4.5	

=== Murilla ===
1923 Queensland state election: Murilla
Party	Candidate	Votes	%	±%
Country	Godfrey Morgan	2,590	55.3	−2.4
Labor	Robert Collins	2,094	44.7	+2.4
Total formal votes		4,684	99.3	+0.2
Informal votes		31	0.7	−0.2
Turnout		4,715	77.5	+1.1
Country hold		Swing	−2.4	

=== Murrumba ===
1923 Queensland state election: Murrumba
Party	Candidate	Votes	%	±%
United	Richard Warren	2,982	51.2	+3.7
Labor	David Moorcroft	1,538	26.4	+6.5
Country	Alfred James	1,206	20.7	−26.8
Independent	Ernest Aston	95	1.6	+1.6
Total formal votes		5,821	98.7	−0.1
Informal votes		75	1.3	+0.1
Turnout		5,896	77.5	+1.3
United hold		Swing	N/A	

=== Nanango ===
1923 Queensland state election: Nanango
Party	Candidate	Votes	%	±%
Country	Jim Edwards	2,852	46.9	+11.4
Labor	Robert Webster	2,414	39.7	+13.1
Independent Country	Robert Hodge	809	13.3	+13.3
Total formal votes		6,075	98.6	+0.6
Informal votes		87	1.4	−0.6
Turnout		6,162	86.8	+3.7
Two-party-preferred result
Country	Jim Edwards	3.426	58.1	
Labor	Robert Webster	2,468	41.9	
Country gain from Independent Country		Swing	N/A	

=== Normanby ===
1923 Queensland state election: Normanby
Party	Candidate	Votes	%	±%
United	Jens Peterson	2,221	53.1	+9.7
Labor	Robert Lyle	1,964	46.9	−9.7
Total formal votes		4,185	99.0	+1.2
Informal votes		42	1.0	−1.2
Turnout		4,227	82.4	+2.4
United gain from Labor		Swing	N/A	

- Jens Peterson was the sitting Labor MP in the 1920 election, but defected to the United party to contest the 1923 election.

=== Nundah ===
1923 Queensland state election: Nundah
Party	Candidate	Votes	%	±%
United	William Kelso	3,659	56.7	−5.8
Labor	James McCabe	2,492	38.6	+1.1
Independent	Thomas Shaw	298	4.7	+4.7
Total formal votes		6,449	98.8	−0.6
Informal votes		77	1.2	+0.6
Turnout		6,526	87.8	+3.2
United hold		Swing	N/A	

=== Oxley ===
1923 Queensland state election: Oxley
Party	Candidate	Votes	%	±%
United	Cecil Elphinstone	4,435	64.5	+5.6
Labor	William Ridings	2,443	35.5	−5.6
Total formal votes		6,878	99.2	−0.3
Informal votes		55	0.8	+0.3
Turnout		6,933	86.9	−0.1
United hold		Swing	+5.6	

=== Paddington ===
1923 Queensland state election: Paddington
Party	Candidate	Votes	%	±%
Labor	Alfred Jones	3,750	64.3	+2.7
United	George Tedman	2,080	35.7	−2.7
Total formal votes		5,830	99.5	+0.5
Informal votes		28	0.5	−0.5
Turnout		5,858	83.3	+5.9
Labor hold		Swing	+2.7	

=== Port Curtis ===
1923 Queensland state election: Port Curtis
Party	Candidate	Votes	%	±%
Labor	George Carter	3,316	52.8	+5.3
United	John Fletcher	2,760	43.9	−8.9
Independent	James Murray	210	3.3	+3.3
Total formal votes		6,286	99.3	−0.3
Informal votes		46	0.7	+0.3
Turnout		6,332	90.8	+3.8
Labor gain from United		Swing	N/A	

=== Queenton ===
1923 Queensland state election: Queenton
Party	Candidate	Votes	%	±%
Labor	Vern Winstanley	1,968	53.1	−11.9
United	John Jones	1,739	46.9	+11.9
Total formal votes		3,707	98.5	+0.2
Informal votes		59	1.5	−0.2
Turnout		3,766	79.3	+2.6
Labor hold		Swing	−11.9	

=== Rockhampton ===
1923 Queensland state election: Rockhampton
Party	Candidate	Votes	%	±%
Labor	George Farrell	2,705	61.4	−4.2
United	Thomas Lanigan	1,699	38.6	+4.2
Total formal votes		4,404	98.4	−0.6
Informal votes		72	1.6	+0.6
Turnout		4,476	76.3	−0.1
Labor hold		Swing	−4.2	

=== Rosewood ===
1923 Queensland state election: Rosewood
Party	Candidate	Votes	%	±%
Labor	William Cooper	3,172	54.1	+2.5
Country	William Bebbington	2,691	45.9	−2.5
Total formal votes		5,863	98.3	−0.9
Informal votes		100	1.7	+0.9
Turnout		5,963	87.9	+0.5
Labor hold		Swing	+2.5	

=== Sandgate ===
1923 Queensland state election: Sandgate
Party	Candidate	Votes	%	±%
United	Hubert Sizer	3,863	63.0	
Independent	Thomas Coaldrake	2,273	37.0	
Total formal votes		6,136	94.2	
Informal votes		377	5.8	
Turnout		6,513	77.6	
United hold		Swing		

=== South Brisbane ===
1923 Queensland state election: South Brisbane
Party	Candidate	Votes	%	±%
Labor	Myles Ferricks	3,155	53.1	+1.5
United	John Kessell	2,450	41.3	−7.1
Independent	Charles Gabbert	333	5.6	+5.6
Total formal votes		5,938	97.6	−0.7
Informal votes		146	2.4	+0.7
Turnout		6,084	84.5	+5.5
Labor hold		Swing	N/A	

=== Stanley ===
1923 Queensland state election: Stanley
Party	Candidate	Votes	%	±%
Country	Frederick Nott	2,929	50.2	+5.3
Independent	Henry Somerset	2,904	49.8	+49.8
Total formal votes		5,833	98.9	−0.1
Informal votes		63	1.1	+0.1
Turnout		5,896	82.2	−0.2
Country hold		Swing	N/A	

=== Toombul ===
1923 Queensland state election: Toombul
Party	Candidate	Votes	%	±%
United	Andrew Petrie	3,991	67.3	+2.5
Independent	Charles Jenkinson	1,936	32.7	+32.7
Total formal votes		5,927	95.6	−3.4
Informal votes		271	4.4	+3.4
Turnout		6,198	83.8	+0.4
United hold		Swing	N/A	

=== Toowong ===
1923 Queensland state election: Toowong
Party	Candidate	Votes	%	±%
United	James Maxwell	4,855	69.7	−2.2
Labor	Robert Easton	2,112	30.3	+2.2
Total formal votes		6,967	99.4	0.0
Informal votes		42	0.6	0.0
Turnout		7,009	87.3	+1.9
United hold		Swing	−2.2	

=== Toowoomba ===
1923 Queensland state election: Toowoomba
Party	Candidate	Votes	%	±%
Labor	Frank Brennan	3,354	52.7	+6.5
United	William Peak	2,988	47.0	+14.8
Independent	Albert Godsall	16	0.3	+0.3
Total formal votes		6,359	99.0	+0.3
Informal votes		65	1.0	−0.3
Turnout		6,424	75.7	−10.0
Labor hold		Swing	+2.5	

==== By-election ====
- This by-election was caused by the appointment of Frank Brennan to the Supreme Court. It was held on 4 April 1925.

1925 Toowoomba state by-election
Party	Candidate	Votes	%	±%
Labor	Evan Llewelyn	3,406	56.3	+3.6
CPNP	James Tolmie	2,646	43.7	−3.3
Total formal votes		6,052	99.3	+0.3
Informal votes		42	0.7	−0.3
Turnout		6,094	79.2	+3.5
Labor hold		Swing	+3.4	

=== Townsville ===
1923 Queensland state election: Townsville
Party	Candidate	Votes	%	±%
Labor	Maurice Hynes	2,168	52.0	+7.0
United	William Green	2,004	48.0	−7.0
Total formal votes		4,172	99.1	+0.7
Informal votes		38	0.9	−0.7
Turnout		4,210	82.4	+2.4
Labor gain from United		Swing	+7.0	

=== Warrego ===
1923 Queensland state election: Warrego
Party	Candidate	Votes	%	±%
Labor	Harry Coyne	2,309	70.2	+1.5
Independent	Thomas Lonsdale	979	29.8	+29.8
Total formal votes		3,288	98.3	+0.6
Informal votes		58	1.7	−0.6
Turnout		3,346	60.7	+4.7
Labor hold		Swing	N/A	

==== By-election ====
- This by-election was caused by the resignation of Harry Coyne. It was held on 13 October 1923.

1923 Warrego state by-election
Party	Candidate	Votes	%	±%
Labor	Randolph Bedford	1,104	59.5	−10.7
Country	Herbert Yeates	468	25.2	+25.2
Independent	George Espie	285	15.3	+15.3
Total formal votes		1,857		
Informal votes				
Turnout				
Labor hold		Swing	N/A	

=== Warwick ===
1923 Queensland state election: Warwick
Party	Candidate	Votes	%	±%
United	George Barnes	3,128	53.8	−1.2
Labor	George Campbell	2,685	46.2	+1.2
Total formal votes		5,813	99.3	+0.1
Informal votes		43	0.7	−0.1
Turnout		5,856	86.3	+0.7
United hold		Swing	−1.2	

=== Wide Bay ===
1923 Queensland state election: Wide Bay
Party	Candidate	Votes	%	±%
Country	Harry Clayton	unopposed		
Country hold		Swing		

=== Windsor ===
1923 Queensland state election: Windsor
Party	Candidate	Votes	%	±%
United	Charles Taylor	3,869	57.6	+3.0
Labor	Sidney Cook	2,843	42.4	−3.0
Total formal votes		6,712	99.3	+0.1
Informal votes		44	0.7	−0.1
Turnout		6,756	87.8	+0.7
United hold		Swing	+3.0	

=== Wynnum ===
1923 Queensland state election: Wynnum
Party	Candidate	Votes	%	±%
United	Walter Barnes	3,694	59.7	
Labor	John McLaughlin	2,498	40.3	
Total formal votes		6,193	99.4	
Informal votes		35	0.6	
Turnout		6,227	78.0	
United hold		Swing		

== See also ==
- 1923 Queensland state election
- Candidates of the Queensland state election, 1923
- Members of the Queensland Legislative Assembly, 1923-1926
