= Candidates of the 1923 Queensland state election =

The 1923 Queensland state election was held on 12 May 1923.

The National Party had reconstituted itself as the Queensland United Party since the previous election. The Northern Country Party had merged with the Country Party, but both its MPs had joined the United Party; seats won by the Northern Country Party in 1920 are listed below as United-held.

== By-elections ==
- On 18 March 1922, Alfred Jones (Labor) was elected to succeed John Fihelly (Labor), who had resigned on 7 February 1922, as the member for Paddington.
- On 17 February 1923, George Farrell (Labor) was elected to succeed Frank Forde, who has resigned on 5 October 1922, as the member for Rockhampton.

== Retiring Members ==
No MLAs retired at this election.

== Candidates ==
Sitting members at the time of the election are shown in bold text.

Electorate	Held by	Labor candidate	Coalition candidate	Other candidates
Albert	Country		**John Appel** (QUP)	
Aubigny	Country	Charles Gould	**Arthur Moore** (CP)	
Balonne	Labor	**Edward Land**	Richard Nates (CP)	
Barcoo	Labor	**Frank Bulcock**		
Bowen	Labor	**Charles Collins**	Frank Ferguson (QUP)	
Bremer	Labor	**Frank Cooper**	Andrew Wright (QUP)	John Budd (Ind)
Brisbane	Labor	**Mick Kirwan**	James Crawford (QUP)	
Bulimba	United	Harry Wright	Duncan Watson (QUP)	Thomas Andrews (Ind)
Bundaberg	Labor	**George Barber**	**Henry Cattermull** (CP)	
Buranda	Labor	**John Huxham**	Charles Edwards (QUP)	
Burke	Labor	**Darby Riordan**	Campbell Murray (QUP)	
Burnett	Country	William McMahon	**Bernard Corser** (CP)	Fred Saidy (Ind)
Burrum	Country	Montague Parker	**William Brand** (CP)	
Cairns	Labor	**William McCormack**	William Griffin (QUP)	
Carnarvon	Country	Thomas Brown	**Edward Costello** (CP)	
Charters Towers	Labor	**William Wellington**	Frank Wood (QUP)	
Chillagoe	Labor	**Ted Theodore**	Ernest Atherton (QUP)	Thomas Taylor (Ind)
Cook	Labor	**Henry Ryan**	Thomas Kilpatrick (QUP)	
Cooroora	Country		**Harry Walker** (CP)	
Cunningham	Country	Denis Hannay	**William Deacon** (CP)	**Cecil Roberts** (Ind CP)
Dalby	Country	Hugh McAnally	**William Vowles** (CP)	N C Hooper (Ind CP)
Eacham	Labor	**William Gillies**		
East Toowoomba	United	Thomas Armfield	**Robert Roberts** (QUP)	
Enoggera	United	John Valentine	**Jim Kerr** (QUP)	
Fassifern	United		**Ernest Bell** (QUP)	John Hardcastle (Ind)
Fitzroy	Labor	**Harry Hartley**	Hugh Grant (QUP)	
Flinders	Labor	**John Mullan**	Leonard Nicolson (QUP)	
Fortitude Valley	Labor	**Thomas Wilson**	Edwin Fowles (QUP)	
Gregory	Labor	**George Pollock**	Fergus McMaster (QUP)	
Gympie	Labor	**Thomas Dunstan**	Henry Cowie (CP)	
Herbert	Labor	**Percy Pease**	John McNamee (QUP)	
Ipswich	Labor	**David Gledson**	James Bottomley (QUP)	
Ithaca	Labor	**John Gilday**	Robert Archibald (QUP)	
Kelvin Grove	Labor	William Lloyd	John Tait (QUP)	
Kennedy	United	Harry Bruce	John Clegg (QUP)	
Keppel	Labor	**James Larcombe**	Roderick Haylock (QUP)	
Kurilpa	United	William Dobinson	**James Fry** (QUP)	
Leichhardt	Labor	**Tom Foley**	Charles Kingston (QUP)	
Lockyer	Country	Albert Kluck	**George Logan** (CP)	William Drayton Armstrong (Ind)
Logan	United	Thomas Jones	**Reginald King** (QUP)	
Mackay	Labor	**William Forgan Smith**	Lewis Nott (QUP)	
Maranoa	Labor	**Charles Conroy**		Frederick Duncombe (Ind CP)
Maree	Labor	**William Bertram**	John Hetherington (QUP)	
Maryborough	Labor	**David Weir**	John Hatton (QUP)	
Merthyr	United	Peter McLachlan	**Peter MacGregor** (QUP)	
Mirani	Country	Henry Turner	**Edward Swayne** (CP)	
Mitchell	Labor	**John Payne**	L M Lyons (QUP)	
Mount Morgan	Labor	**James Stopford**	Frederick McCarthy (QUP)	
Mundingburra	Labor	**John Dash**	William Swales (QUP)	
Murilla	Country	Robert Collins	**Godfrey Morgan** (CP)	
Murrumba	United	David Moorcroft	**Richard Warren** (QUP)	
Nanango	Country	Robert Webster	**Jim Edwards** (CP)	Robert Hodge (Ind CP)
Normanby	Labor	Robert Lyle	**Jens Peterson** (QUP)	
Nundah	United	James McCabe	William Kelso (QUP)	Thomas Shaw (Ind)
Oxley	United	William Ridings	**Cecil Elphinstone** (QUP)	
Paddington	Labor	**Alfred Jones**	George Tedman (QUP)	
Port Curtis	United	George Carter	**John Fletcher** (QUP)	James Murray (Ind)
Queenton	Labor	**Vern Winstanley**	**John Jones** (QUP)	
Rockhampton	Labor	**George Farrell**	Thomas Lanigan (QUP)	
Rosewood	Labor	**William Cooper**	**William Bebbington** (CP)	
Sandgate	United		**Hubert Sizer** (QUP)	Thomas Coaldrake (Ind)
South Brisbane	Labor	**Myles Ferricks**	John Kessell (QUP)	Charles Gabbert (Ind)
Stanley	Country		**Frederick Nott** (CP)	Henry Somerset (Ind)
Toombul	United		**Andrew Petrie** (QUP)	Charles Jenkinson (Ind)
Toowong	United	Robert Easton	**James Maxwell** (QUP)	
Toowoomba	Labor	**Frank Brennan**	William Peak (QUP)	Albert Godsall (Ind)
Townsville	United	Maurice Hynes	**William Green** (QUP)	
Warrego	Labor	**Harry Coyne**		Thomas Lonsdale (Ind)
Warwick	United	George Campbell	**George Barnes** (QUP)	
Wide Bay	Country		**Harry Clayton** (CP)	
Windsor	United	Sidney Cook	**Charles Taylor** (QUP)	
Wynnum	United	John McLaughlin	**Walter Barnes** (QUP)	

== See also ==
- 1923 Queensland state election
- Members of the Queensland Legislative Assembly, 1920–1923
- Members of the Queensland Legislative Assembly, 1923–1926
- List of political parties in Australia
