= Members of the Queensland Legislative Assembly, 1920–1923 =

This is a list of members of the 22nd Legislative Assembly of Queensland from 1920 to 1923, as elected at the 1920 state election held on 9 October 1920.

This was the first major showing of the Country Party in the Queensland parliament. In 1923, the Northern Country Party merged with the Country Party, but its two members both defected to the Nationalists who, with two former Country Party members, formed the United Party.

Name	Party	Electorate	Term in office
John Appel	Country/United	Albert	1908–1929
George Barber	Labor	Bundaberg	1901–1935
George Barnes	National/United	Warwick	1908–1935
Walter Barnes	National/United	Bulimba	1901–1915, 1918–1933
William Bebbington	Country	Drayton	1912–1923
Ernest Bell	Country/United	Fassifern	1913–1930
Hon William Bertram	Labor	Maree	1912–1929
William Brand	Country	Burrum	1920–1950
Frank Brennan	Labor	Toowoomba	1918–1925
Frank Bulcock	Labor	Barcoo	1919–1942
Henry Cattermull	Country	Musgrave	1920–1923
Harry Clayton	Country	Wide Bay	1920–1946
Charles Collins	Labor	Bowen	1909–1912, 1915–1936
Charles Conroy	Labor	Maranoa	1920–1944
Frank Cooper	Labor	Bremer	1915–1946
William Cooper	Labor	Rosewood	1918–1929
Bernard Corser	Country	Burnett	1912–1928
Edward Costello	Country	Carnarvon	1920–1935
Harry Coyne	Labor	Warrego	1908–1923
John Dash	Labor	Mundingburra	1920–1944
William Deacon	Country	Cunningham	1920–1943
Hon Thomas Dunstan	Labor	Gympie	1915–1929, 1935–1953
Jim Edwards	Independent/Country	Nanango	1920–1947
Cecil Elphinstone	National/United	Oxley	1918–1929
George Farrell^{[2]}	Labor	Rockhampton	1923–1929
Myles Ferricks	Labor	South Brisbane	1909–1912, 1920–1929
Hon John Fihelly^{[1]}	Labor	Paddington	1912–1922
John Fletcher	National/United	Port Curtis	1920–1923
Tom Foley	Labor	Leichhardt	1919–1960
Frank Forde^{[2]}	Labor	Rockhampton	1917–1922, 1955–1957
James Fry	National/United	Kurilpa	1918–1932
John Gilday	Labor	Ithaca	1912–1926
Hon William Gillies	Labor	Eacham	1912–1925
Hon David Gledson	Labor	Ipswich	1915–1929, 1932–1949
William Green	Northern Country/United	Townsville	1920–1923
Harry Hartley	Labor	Fitzroy	1915–1929
Hon John Huxham	Labor	Buranda	1908–1909, 1912–1924
Hon Alfred Jones^{[1]}	Labor	Paddington	1904–1909, 1915–1917, 1922–1932
John Jones	Northern Country/United	Kennedy	1920–1923
Jim Kerr	National/United	Enoggera	1920–1932
Reginald King	National/United	Logan	1920–1935
Mick Kirwan	Labor	Brisbane	1912–1932
Edward Land	Labor	Balonne	1904–1927
James Larcombe	Labor	Keppel	1912–1929, 1932–1956
George Logan	Country	Lockyer	1920–1929
Hon William McCormack	Labor	Cairns	1912–1930
Peter MacGregor	National/United	Merthyr	1920–1923
James Maxwell	National/United	Toowong	1920–1938
Arthur Moore	Country	Aubigny	1915–1941
Godfrey Morgan	Country	Murilla	1909–1938
Hon John Mullan	Labor	Flinders	1908–1912, 1918–1941
Frederick Nott	Country	Stanley	1920–1927
John Payne	Labor	Mitchell	1905–1928
Percy Pease	Labor	Herbert	1920–1940
Jens Peterson	Labor/United	Normanby	1915–1935
Andrew Petrie	United	Toombul	1893–1926
George Pollock	Labor	Gregory	1915–1939
Darby Riordan	Labor	Burke	1918–1929
Cecil Roberts	Country	Pittsworth	1920–1923
Robert Roberts	National/United	East Toowoomba	1907–1934
Henry Ryan	Labor	Cook	1915–1929
Hubert Sizer	National/United	Nundah	1918–1935
Hon William Forgan Smith	Labor	Mackay	1915–1942
Hon James Stopford	Labor	Mount Morgan	1915–1936
Edward Swayne	Northern Country/Country	Mirani	1907–1935
Charles Taylor	National/United	Windsor	1918–1935
Hon Ted Theodore	Labor	Chillagoe	1909–1925
William Vowles	Country	Dalby	1911–1926
Harry Walker	Country	Cooroora	1907–1947
Richard Warren	Country/United	Murrumba	1918–1932
David Weir	Labor	Maryborough	1917–1929
William Wellington	Labor	Charters Towers	1915–1939
Hon Thomas Wilson	Labor	Fortitude Valley	1916–1933
Vern Winstanley	Labor	Queenton	1908–1932

^{1} On 7 February 1922, the Labor member for Paddington, John Fihelly, resigned to take up an appointment as Agent-General for Queensland in London. The Labor candidate and former President of the Queensland Legislative Council, Alfred Jones, won the resulting by-election on 18 March 1922.
^{2} On 5 October 1922, the Labor member for Rockhampton, Frank Forde, resigned to contest the 1922 election for the seat of Capricornia. George Farrell, the Labor candidate, won the resulting by-election on 17 February 1923.

== See also ==
- 1920 Queensland state election
- Theodore Ministry (Labor) (1919–1925)
