= 1920 Queensland state election =

- 9 October 1920

All 72 seats in the Legislative Assembly of Queensland 37 Assembly seats were needed for a majority
- Turnout: 79.93 (▼0.34 pp)
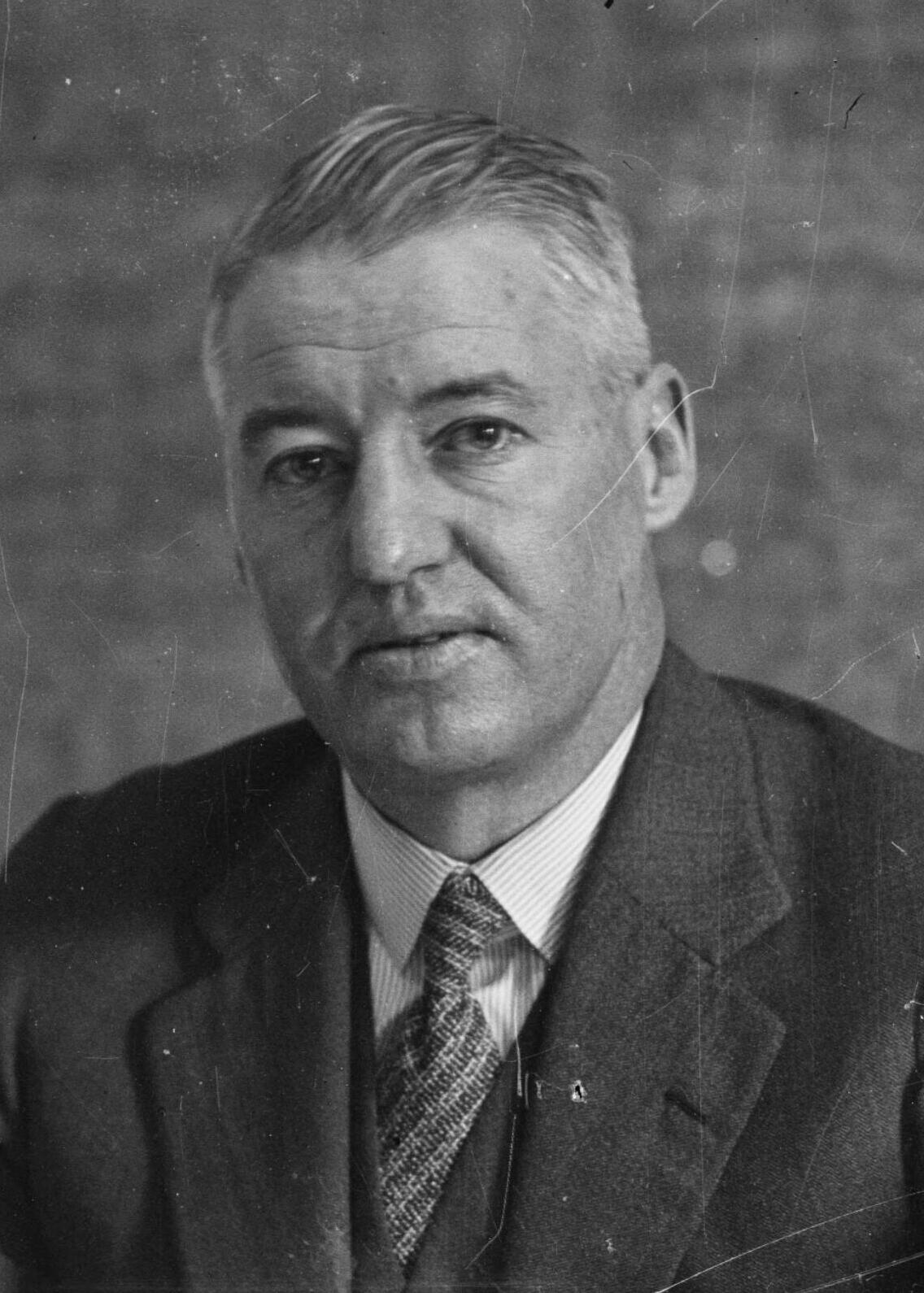

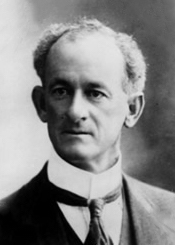

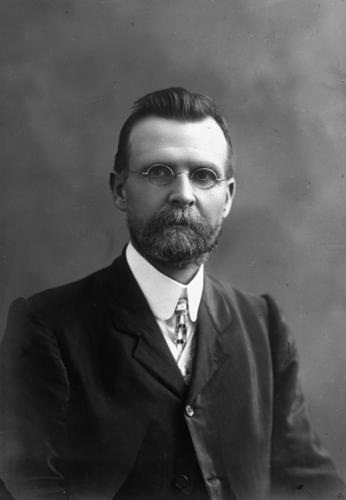
	First party	Second party
Leader	Ted Theodore	William Vowles
Party	Labor	Country
Leader since	22 October 1919	28 January 1920
Leader's seat	Chillagoe	Dalby
Last election	48 seats, 53.68%	Did not contest
Seats before	47	11
Seats won	38	18
Seat change	▼9	▼7
Popular vote	168,455	60,170
Percentage	47.77%	17.06%
Swing	▼5.91	▲17.06
	Third party	Fourth party
		NCP
Leader	Walter Barnes	Edward Swayne
Party	National	Northern Country
Leader since	28 July 1920	—
Leader's seat	Bulimba	Mirani
Last election	22 seats, 44.62%	Did not exist
Seats before	11	1
Seats won	13	3
Seat change	▲2	▲2
Popular vote	90,730	20,246
Percentage	25.73%	5.74%
Swing	▼18.89	New party
Premier before election
Ted Theodore
Labor
Elected Premier
Ted Theodore
Labor

Elections were held in the Australian state of Queensland on 9 October 1920 to elect the 72 members of the state's Legislative Assembly. The Labor government was re-elected to its third term in office, having been in power since the 1915 election. It was Ted Theodore's first election as premier, following his election in 1919 to succeed T. J. Ryan as Labor leader.

During the previous term, the Queensland Country Party, had re-emerged from the National bloc, taking half of the Country Party's parliamentary seats with it. A Labor member, Alfred James, switched to the party, and the Maranoa by-election in 1919 saw them gain a seat at the expense of Labor. An additional party, the Northern Country Party, also formed during this time to represent the interests of North Queensland farmers and canegrowers. To avoid three-cornered contests with Labor, the three parties agreed upon a division of seats between themselves.

== Key dates ==
Date	Event
10 September 1920	The Parliament was dissolved.
10 September 1920	Writs were issued by the Governor to proceed with an election.
18 September 1920	Close of nominations.
9 October 1920	Polling day, between the hours of 8am and 6pm.
12 November 1920	The Theodore Ministry was reconstituted.
15 November 1920	The writ was returned and the results formally declared.

== Results ==
Queensland state election, 9 October 1920 Legislative Assembly << 1918–1923 >>
Enrolled voters	445,681^{[1]}				
Votes cast	356,226		Turnout	79.93	–0.34
Informal votes	3,600		Informal	1.01	–0.17
Summary of votes by party
Party	Primary votes	%	Swing	Seats	Change
Labor	168,455	47.77	–5.91	38	– 8
National	90,730	25.73	–18.89	13	– 9
Country	60,170	17.06	+17.06	18	+ 18
Northern Country	20,246	5.74	+5.74	3	+ 3
Independent Country	6,055	1.72	+1.72	0	± 0
National Labor	4,216	1.20	+1.20	0	± 0
Independent	2,794	0.79	–0.90	0	– 2
Total	352,666			72	

^{1} 462,218 electors were enrolled to vote at the election, but 2 Country Party seats (Cooroora and Cunningham), 1 United Party seat (Albert) and 1 Labor seat (Mitchell) were unopposed.

== Seats changing party representation ==
This table lists changes in party representation at the 1920 election.

=== Party changes before election ===
The following seats changed party representation before the election due to the split of the National party.

Seat	Incumbent member	Former party	New party
Albert	John Appel	National Party	Country Party
Aubigny	Arthur Moore	National Party	Country Party
Burnett	Bernard Corser	National Party	Country Party
Cooroora	Harry Walker	National Party	Country Party
Dalby	William Vowles	National Party	Country Party
Drayton	William Bebbington	National Party	Country Party
Fassifern	Ernest Bell	National Party	Country Party
Logan	Alfred James	Labor Party	Country Party
Mirani	Edward Swayne	National Party	Northern Country
Murilla	Godfrey Morgan	National Party	Country Party
Murrumba	Richard Warren	National Party	Country Party
Nanango	Robert Hodge	National Party	Country Party

=== Seats changing hands at election ===
Seat	Incumbent member	Party	New member	Party
Burrum	Albert Whitford	Labor	William Brand	Country
Carnarvon	Donald Gunn	National	Edward Costello	Country
Cunningham	Francis Grayson	Independent	William Deacon	Country
Enoggera	William Lloyd	Labor	Jim Kerr	National
Kennedy	James O'Sullivan	Labor	John Jones	Northern Country
Logan	Alfred James	Country	Reginald King	National
Maranoa	Thomas Spencer	Country	Charles Conroy	Labor
Merthyr	Peter McLachlan	Labor	Peter MacGregor	National
Musgrave	Thomas Armfield	Labor	Henry Cattermull	Country
Nanango	Robert Hodge	Country	Jim Edwards	Independent Country
Pittsworth	Percy Bayley	Independent	Cecil Roberts	Country
Port Curtis	George Carter	Labor	John Fletcher	National
Stanley	Henry Somerset	National	Frederick Nott	Country
Townsville	Daniel Ryan	Labor	William Green	Northern Country
Wide Bay	Andrew Thompson	Labor	Harry Clayton	Country

- Members listed in italics did not recontest their seats.
- Sitting Country member for Maranoa, Thomas Spencer won this seat from Labor at the 1919 by-election.

== See also ==
- Members of the Queensland Legislative Assembly, 1918–1920
- Members of the Queensland Legislative Assembly, 1920–1923
- Candidates of the Queensland state election, 1920
- Theodore Ministry
