= 1923 Queensland state election =

- 12 May 1923

All 72 seats in the Legislative Assembly of Queensland 37 Assembly seats were needed for a majority
- Turnout: 82.23 (▲2.30 pp)
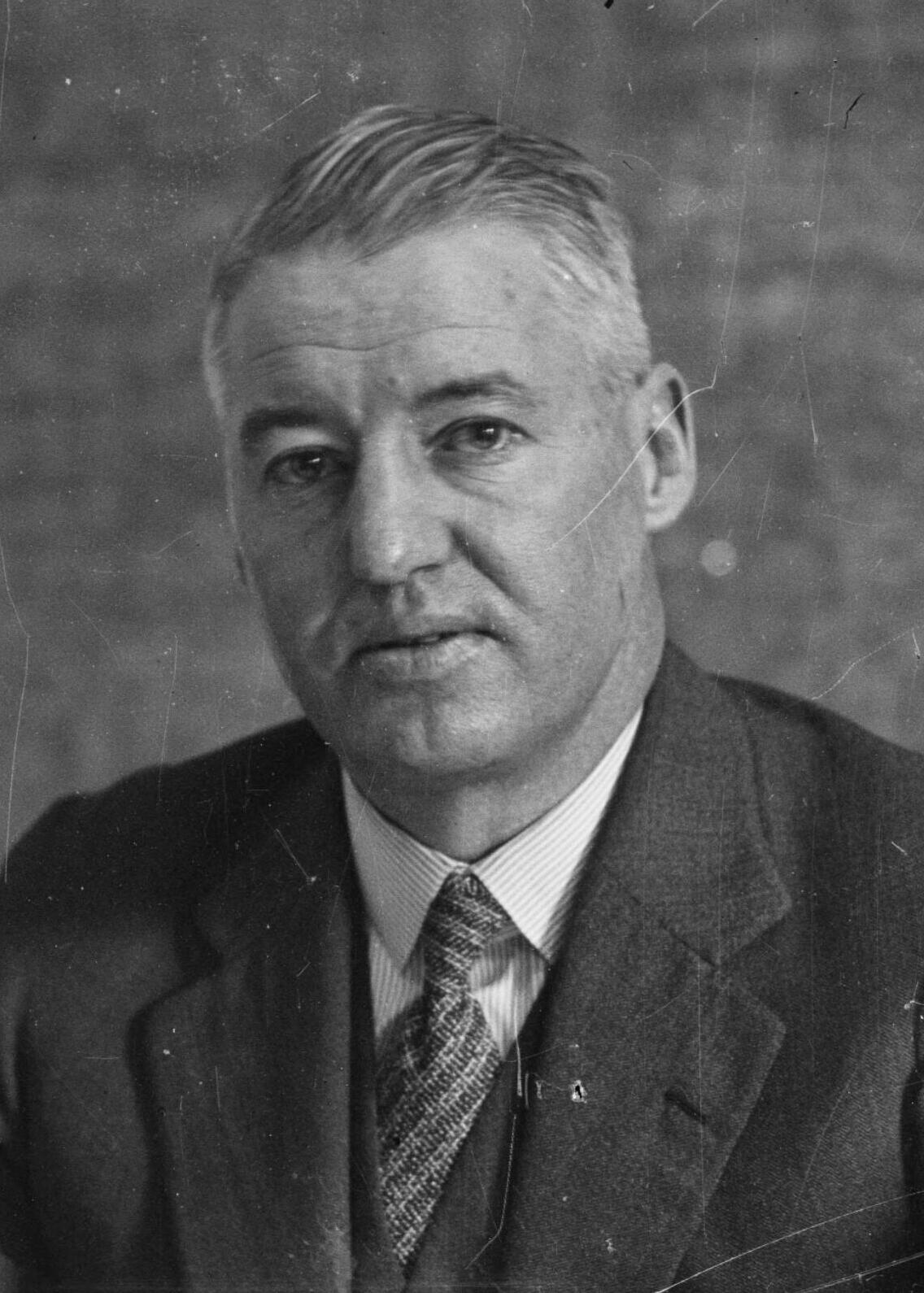

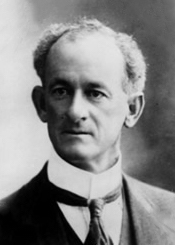
	First party	Second party	Third party
		UP
Leader	Ted Theodore	No leader	William Vowles
Party	Labor	United Party	Country
Leader since	22 October 1919		28 January 1920
Leader's seat	Chillagoe		Dalby
Last election	38 seats, 47.77%	New party	18 seats, 17.06%
Seats won	43	16	13
Seat change	▲5	▲3	▼4
Popular vote	175,659	131,810	39,534
Percentage	48.13%	36.12%	10.83%
Swing	▲0.38	▲10.39	▲4.16
Premier before election
Ted Theodore
Labor
Elected Premier
Ted Theodore
Labor

Elections were held in the Australian state of Queensland on 12 May 1923 to elect the 72 members of the state's Legislative Assembly. The Labor government was seeking its fourth continuous term in office since the 1915 election; it would be Premier Ted Theodore's second election.

== Key dates ==
Date	Event
13 April 1923	The Parliament was dissolved.
13 April 1923	Writs were issued by the Governor to proceed with an election.
20 April 1923	Close of nominations.
12 May 1923	Polling day, between the hours of 8am and 6pm.
23 June 1923	The writ was returned and the results formally declared.
2 July 1923	The Theodore Ministry was reconstituted.
10 July 1923	Parliament resumed for business.

== Results ==
Queensland state election, 12 May 1923 Legislative Assembly << 1920–1926 >>
Enrolled voters	449,087^{[1]}				
Votes cast	369,267		Turnout	82.23	+2.30
Informal votes	4,311		Informal	1.17	+0.16
Summary of votes by party
Party	Primary votes	%	Swing	Seats	Change
Labor	175,659	48.13	+0.36	43	+ 5
United	131,810	36.12	+10.39	16	+ 3
Country	39,534	10.83	–6.23	13	– 4
Independent Country	4,732	1.30	–0.42	0	– 1
Independent	13,221	3.62	+2.83	0	± 0
Others			–6.94		– 3
Total	364,956			72	

^{1} 475,957 electors were enrolled to vote at the election, but 2 Country Party seats (Cooroora and Wide Bay), 1 United Party seat (Albert) and 1 Labor seat (Barcoo) were unopposed.

== Seats changing party representation ==
This table lists changes in party representation at the 1923 election.

Seat	Incumbent member	Party	New member	Party
Albert	John Appel	Country	John Appel	United
Bulimba	Walter Barnes	United	Harry Wright	Labor
Drayton	William Bebbington	Country	Seat abolished	
Kelvin Grove	New seat		William Lloyd	Labor
Kennedy	John Jones	United	Harry Bruce	Labor
Merthyr	Peter MacGregor	United	Peter McLachlan	Labor
Musgrave	Henry Cattermull	Country	Seat abolished	
Nanango	Jim Edwards	Independent Country	Jim Edwards	Country
Normanby	Jens Peterson	Labor	Jens Peterson	United
Pittsworth	Cecil Roberts	Independent Country	Seat abolished	
Port Curtis	John Fletcher	United	George Carter	Labor
Sandgate	New seat		Hubert Sizer	United
Townsville	William Green	United	Maurice Hynes	Labor
Wynnum	New seat		Walter Barnes	United

- Members listed in italics did not recontest their seats.
- The United party member for Bulimba, Walter Barnes instead contested the new seat of Wynnum and won.
- The Country party member for the abolished seat of Drayton, William Bebbington instead contested the seat of Rosewood and lost.
- The United party member for the Kennedy, John Jones instead contested the seat of Queenton and lost.
- The Country party member for the abolished seat of Musgrave, Henry Cattermull instead contested the seat of Bundaberg and lost.
- The Independent Country party member for the abolished seat of Pittsworth, Cecil Roberts instead contested the seat of Cunningham and lost.

== See also ==
- Members of the Queensland Legislative Assembly, 1920–1923
- Members of the Queensland Legislative Assembly, 1923–1926
- Candidates of the Queensland state election, 1923
- Theodore Ministry
