= Francis Grayson =

Australian politician (1849–1927)

Francis Grayson JP
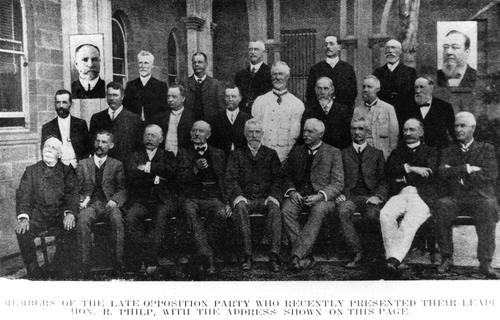
- Members of the opposition party Queensland Parliament 1909 - Grayson is standing on the right, rear row.

Member of the Queensland Legislative Assembly for Cunningham
- In office 27 August 1904 – 9 October 1920
- Preceded by: Duncan Watson
- Succeeded by: William Deacon

Personal details
- Born: Francis Grayson; 2 September 1849 Lurgan, County Armagh, Ireland
- Died: 27 July 1927 (aged 77) Warwick, Queensland, Australia
- Resting place: Warwick General Cemetery
- Party: Independent
- Other political affiliations: Ministerial, Kidstonites, Opposition, Liberals, National
- Spouse: Jane Bell (m.1872 d.1930)
- Occupation: Shopkeeper

Francis Grayson (2 September 1849 – 27 July 1927) was a shopkeeper and member of the Queensland Legislative Assembly.

== Biography ==
Grayson was born at Lurgan, County Armagh, to parents John Grayson and his wife Jane (née Irwin) and educated at the Church of England School in Lurgan. He left Ireland at age fourteen to come to Australia, arriving in Brisbane in 1864. Almost immediately he set out for the Darling Downs and began work at Glengallan Station which at the time was owned by the Deuchar family.

In 1870, he took up a selection of his own and named it Silverwood. After five years there he moved to Warwick where he opened a general and produce store which successfully operated for the next 27 years.

In 1872, Grayson married Jane Bell and together had two sons and four daughters. He died in 1927 after suffering a short illness and was buried in the Warwick General Cemetery.

== Political career ==
Grayson became an alderman on the Warwick Town Council in 1879 and, except for a three-year break was on the council until 1905. He was Mayor on three occasions - 1892, 1896, and 1904.

At the 1904 state elections, standing as a Ministerialist, Grayson defeated the sitting member, Duncan Watson for the seat of Cunningham in the Queensland Legislative Assembly. He was later a member of successive parties the Kidstonites, the Liberals, the National Party, and ended up as an independent. He retired from his seat at the 1920 state elections.

Parliament of Queensland
Preceded by Duncan Watson	Member for Cunningham; 1904–1920	Succeeded by William Deacon
