= Harry Wright (Queensland politician) =

Australian politician

Member of the Queensland Legislative Assembly for Bulimba
- In office 12 May 1923 – 11 May 1929
- Preceded by: Walter Barnes
- Succeeded by: Irene Longman

Personal details
- Born: Albert Henry Wright; 1890 Marston, Derbyshire, England
- Died: 20 March 1963 (aged 72) Morningside, Queensland, Australia
- Party: Labor Party
- Spouse: Florence Mabel Hoskins (m.1915 d.1980)
- Occupation: Coachmaker

Albert Henry Wright (1890 – 20 March 1963) was a member of the Queensland Legislative Assembly.

== Biography ==
Wright was born in Marston, Derbyshire, the son of John Wright and his wife Elizabeth (née Barnes). He was educated at Hatton Council School, Derby, and after his arrival in Queensland was employed at the American Meatworks in Brisbane. He later worked as a coachmaker and engineer.

On 7 April 1915 he married Florence Mabel Hoskins (died 1980) in Kingaroy and together had three sons and a daughter. Wright died in March 1963 and was cremated at the Mt Thompson Crematorium.

== Public career ==
Wright, for the Labor Party, won the seat of Bulimba at the 1923 Queensland state election, taking over the electorate from Walter Barnes, who decided to contest the new seat of Wynnum. Wright held Bulimba for six years, being defeated in 1929 by Irene Longman, the first woman in the Queensland Parliament.

After his defeat he became a representative of the Metropolitan Fire Brigade Board. Wright was also a member of the Independent Order of Rechabites.

Parliament of Queensland
Preceded by Walter Barnes	Member for Bulimba; 1923–1929	Succeeded by Irene Longman
