= 1923 Rockhampton state by-election =

By-election in Queensland, Australia

A by-election was held in the Legislative Assembly of Queensland seat of Rockhampton on 17 February 1923. It was triggered by the resignation of Frank Forde after he had been successful with his bid to enter federal politics, winning the seat of Capricornia at the 1922 Federal Election.

== Background ==
Due to the slim majority Ted Theodore's government had at the time, the result of the 1923 Rockhampton by-election was critical to the Labor Party as to whether they could remain in power.

As such, it became a bitter campaign and is infamous in political circles for its aggressive, scandalous and sometimes violent nature which included allegations of a smear campaign, and bribery.

During the campaign, it was discovered a woman had been allegedly paid to come to Rockhampton to claim Labor candidate George Farrell was the father of her two-year-old child in a deliberate attempt to cost him votes.

The allegations were met with widespread condemnation in the press. Brisbane's Labor newspaper The Daily Standard was perhaps unsurprisingly amongst the most vocal in their criticism of the apparent smear campaign against Farrell.

The by-election campaign became so eventful that it was widely reported in the national press including in some Sydney newspapers.

== Candidates ==
=== United Party ===
William Charlton, already serving as Rockhampton mayor, contested the by-election representing the United Party. Born in Rockhampton in 1870, Charlton was a local Rockhampton businessman who had originally entered local politics by serving for three years on Mount Morgan Town Council. He began serving on Rockhampton City Council as an alderman in 1914 and became mayor of Rockhampton in 1921. He declared during the campaign that he didn't plan on resigning from being Rockhampton mayor if he was successful in becoming Member for Rockhampton, claiming that the dual role would bring benefits to the local area.

=== Labor Party ===
George Farrell was born in Eidsvold and was educated in Howard. After becoming a pupil teacher in 1909 for the Department of Public Instruction, he was transferred to Rockhampton in 1914 to become a teacher at the Central Boys School. During his time in Rockhampton, he served as president of various branches of the Labor Party and acted as the campaign secretary for Frank Forde in Forde's campaign to win the Federal seat of Capricornia in 1921. After Forde's success, Farrell was nominated by the Labor Party to contest the resulting by-election.

=== Independent Nationalist ===
Charles Iredale immigrated to Australia from England at a young age and settled at Pink Lily. Throughout his life he became known for being outspoken on various local issues and for his repeated attempts to enter local politics. Iredale had previously contested 13 local elections before finally being successful in becoming an alderman on Rockhampton City Council where he served just one term. Following this, he contested several more local elections, becoming successful in serving several terms with the neighbouring Fitzroy Shire Council. He launched an eleventh-hour bid to contest the by-election as an Independent Nationalist with an announcement at the Rockhampton School of Arts just days before the event. Iredale's impromptu campaign for the by-election was generally met with derision with his address frequently interrupted by heckles and interjections from the crowd that had gathered to watch.

== Results ==
Following the by-election, it was announced that Farrell had been declared the winner. Farrell had little time to settle in to the role and was soon back campaigning when the Queensland parliament was dissolved two months later for the 1923 Queensland election which was held on 12 May 1923.

1923 Rockhampton by-election
Party	Candidate	Votes	%	±%
Labor	George Farrell	2587	n/a	n/a
United	William Charlton	1638	n/a	n/a
Ind. National	Charles Iredale	62	n/a	n/a
Labor hold		Swing	N/A	

== See also ==
- Electoral results for the district of Rockhampton
- List of Queensland state by-elections
