= National Labor Party (Queensland) =

- Founded: October 1919
- Dissolved: 1920
- Ideology: Nationalism; Interventionism; Social democracy

The National Labor Party was a brief-lived political party in the Australian state of Queensland. Although sharing similarities to the federal party of the same name, it was actually founded over two years after its federal counterpart merged into the Nationalist Party. It did not enjoy electoral success and soon faded away.

== History ==
In Queensland the Australian Labor Party split of 1916 had only a minor impact. Only one state MP, John Adamson, and one federal MP, Fred Bamford, left the party and there was no breakaway state party. Instead Premier T. J. Ryan worked hard to successfully keep the party together in the state with only limited losses. Adamson joined the federal Nationalist Party but did not initially seek to organise a new state party, instead unsuccessfully standing as an "Independent Democrat" against John Fihelly, one of the strongest anti-conscriptionists at the 1918 state election.

Although the federal National Labor Party lasted only a few months in 1916–1917, in October 1919 Adamson was involved in the setting up of a state party for ex-Labor supporters. This allied with, but did not join, the National Political Council which sought to combine and co-ordinate anti-Labor activity in the state. The party contested three seats in Brisbane in the 1920 state election but won none of them. The party subsequently faded from the scene.
