= Percy Bayley =

Australian politician

Member of the Queensland Legislative Assembly for Pittsworth
- In office 22 May 1915 – 9 October 1920
- Preceded by: Donald MacKintosh
- Succeeded by: Cecil Roberts

Personal details
- Born: Percy Mollineux Bayley; 21 December 1879 Franklin, Tasmania, Australia
- Died: 16 August 1942 (aged 62) Quinalow, Queensland, Australia
- Resting place: Drayton and Toowoomba Cemetery
- Party: Queensland Farmers Union
- Spouse: Mary Elizabeth Evans (m.1904 d.1968)
- Education: Gatton Agricultural College
- Occupation: Farmer

Percy Mollineux Bayley (21 December 1879 – 16 August 1942) was an Australian politician. He was a member of the Queensland Legislative Assembly from 1915 to 1920.

Bayley was born at Franklin, Tasmania, the son of James Mollineux Bayley and his wife Mary Alice (née Frencham). He was educated at Brisbane Grammar School and then attended the Gatton Agricultural College, where he studied cheese and butter making. Following his graduation from Gatton, he was appointed manager of the Pittsworth Co-Op Dairy Association in 1899. Bayley successfully expanded the company's operations, establishing branches across the district and turning around the company's fortunes, although an attempt at establishing a butter factory was less successful.

Bayley, a member of the Queensland Farmers Union, won the seat of Pittsworth in the Queensland Legislative Assembly at the 1915 state election. He was seriously injured in a motorcycle accident in the same year, suffering head injuries so severe that "his recovery was regarded as miraculous". Bayley was re-elected as an "Independent Nationalist" in 1918 after a deal to swap contingency votes with the endorsed National candidate. However, in 1920, with the increasing formalisation of a Country Party, he fell out with the Primary Producers' Union over the holding of a preselection plebiscite, withdrew his name from contention, and contested the election as an "Independent Country Party" candidate. He was soundly defeated at the 1920 election by endorsed Country Party candidate Cecil Roberts. Bayley was the chairman of the Pittsworth State School Committee, and one of his achievements as a state MP was achieving the relocation of the school to a more suitable site.

Bayley became a farmer after his political career, owning a property at Brookstead for many years before selling and purchasing a property at Oakey. He worked the Oakey property with one of his sons until his death. He died at Quinalow in 1942 and was buried in the Drayton and Toowoomba Cemetery.

Bayley married Mary Elizabeth Evans (died 1968) on 6 September 1904 and together had two sons and three daughters.

His sister, Irene Longman, was the first woman to stand and be elected to the Queensland Parliament, while his brother, James Bayley, was a long-serving federal MP who also had a brief stint as a state MP.

Parliament of Queensland
Preceded by Donald Mackintosh	Member for Pittsworth; 1915–1920	Succeeded by Cecil Roberts
