= Duncan Watson (politician) =

Australian politician

Member of the Queensland Legislative Assembly for Cunningham
- In office 29 October 1903 – 27 August 1904
- Preceded by: Francis Kates
- Succeeded by: Francis Grayson

Personal details
- Born: Duncan John Reay Watson; 4 November 1867 Timaru, New Zealand
- Died: 30 October 1948 (aged 80) Indooroopilly, Queensland, Australia
- Resting place: Toowong Cemetery
- Party: Opposition
- Spouse: Elizabeth Margaret Crowe (m.1905 d.1945)
- Occupation: Solicitor

Duncan John Reay Watson (4 November 1867 – 30 October 1948) was a solicitor and member of the Queensland Legislative Assembly. He was the brother of journalist and writer John Reay Watson.

== Biography ==
Watson was born at Timaru, New Zealand, to parents John Dalton Watson and his wife Mary Annie (née Mackay) and educated in Queensland at Maryborough State School and Maryborough Grammar School. He commenced work as an apprentice builder with his father and then became a teacher at Maryborough Central State School. He next worked for the Bank of NSW in northern and central Queensland.

He was admitted to the Queensland Bar as a solicitor in 1895 and operated his own successful legal practice until his retirement in 1938.

In 1905 Watson married Elizabeth Margaret Crowe in Sydney and together had one daughter. He died at Indooroopilly in Brisbane in 1948. His funeral proceeded from the Holy Family Catholic Church, Indooroopilly, to the Toowong Cemetery.

== Political career ==
After the death of serving member, Francis Kates, in 1903, Watson won the resulting by-election for the seat of Cunningham in the Queensland Legislative Assembly. He held the seat for less than a year, being beaten at the 1904 state election by the Ministerial candidate, Francis Grayson.

He stood at the 1920 state election as an independent Country Party candidate for the seat of Stanley but was well beaten by both other candidates. He later joined the Australian Labor Party, and unsuccessfully contested the federal seat of Maranoa at the 1934 federal election.

Parliament of Queensland
Preceded by Francis Kates	Member for Cunningham; 1903–1904	Succeeded by Francis Grayson
