= Thomas Armfield =

Australian politician

Member of the Queensland Legislative Assembly for Musgrave
- In office 22 May 1915 – 9 October 1920
- Preceded by: John White
- Succeeded by: Henry Cattermull

Personal details
- Born: Thomas Gummersal Armfield; 1851 Suffolk, England
- Died: 21 April 1931 (aged 79-80) Kogarah, New South Wales, Australia
- Resting place: Northern Suburbs Cemetery
- Party: Labor
- Spouse: Margaret Theresa Campbell (m.1877 d.1929)
- Occupation: Coachsmith

Thomas Gummersal Armfield (1851 – 21 April 1931) was a member of the Queensland Legislative Assembly.

== Early life ==
Armfield was born at Suffolk, England, the son of George Armfield and his wife Rachel Louie (née White). He was a Coachsmith by trade.

In 1877 he married Margaret Theresa Campbell (died 1929) at Albury, New South Wales with the marriage producing one son and two daughters. Armfield died at Kogarah in of April 1931 and his funeral proceeded from his daughter's residence in Sydney to the Northern Suburbs Cemetery.

== Public life ==
Armfield did not make an auspicious start to his campaign for election, receiving just 13 votes in the 1901 New South Wales state election as an independent candidate for Randwick. In 1904 he stood as a Progressive candidate, receiving 134 votes (4.5%).

Armfield, representing the Labor Party, won the seat of Musgrave in the Queensland Assembly at the 1915 Queensland state election. He held the seat until the 1920 Queensland state election where he was defeated by the Country Party's Henry Cattermull.

In 1879 Armfield established the Coachmakers' Union and was president of the Workers' Political Organisation in Bundaberg.

Parliament of Queensland
Preceded by John White	Member for Musgrave; 1915–1920	Succeeded by Henry Cattermull
