= Frank Brennan (judge) =

Australian politician, Supreme Court judge

The Hon Frank Brennan
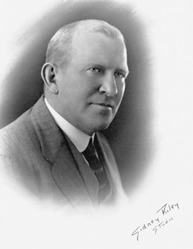

Member of the Queensland Legislative Assembly for Toowoomba
- In office 16 March 1918 – 26 February 1925
- Preceded by: James Tolmie
- Succeeded by: Evan Llewelyn

Personal details
- Born: Frank Tenison Brennan; 6 December 1884 Maryborough, Queensland, Australia
- Died: 6 August 1949 (aged 64) Brisbane, Queensland, Australia
- Resting place: Nudgee Cemetery
- Party: Labor
- Spouse: Hanna Maria Gertrude Koenig (m.1922 d.1960)
- Occupation: Judge of the Supreme Court of Queensland, Solicitor

Frank Tenison Brennan (6 December 1884 – 6 August 1949) was a Labor Party politician, lawyer and Supreme Court judge. He was a Queensland MLA from 1918 to 1925.

== History ==
Born in Maryborough the son of Martin Brennan and educated at the Christian Brothers' College there, served his articles at Warwick, Queensland, with his brother E. J. Brennan, and qualified in 1912, heading the list of that year. He practised as a solicitor in Toowoomba from 1912 to 1918. He was active in the anti-conscription campaign.

He was elected to the Queensland Legislative Assembly for Toowoomba in 1923, defeating James Tolmie. He was appointed Minister in Charge of Health and Local Authorities, and the following year, Education Minister. The same year he was admitted to the Bar, and in 1925 he was elevated to the Supreme Court and retired from parliament.

=== The bribery case ===
On 14 August 1922, two men, Sleeman and Connolly, were arrested for having attempted to bribe Mr Brennan. It was established at their trial that the object was to induce Mr Brennan to cross the House to bring down the Government. It was stated that he was offered £3500. The men were trapped at Mr Brennan's house, where holes had been bored in the walls to allow detectives and shorthand writers to obtain a complete record of their conversation. They were sentenced to three months' imprisonment, and fined £500 each.

=== Supreme Court ===
In 1925 he was elevated to the Supreme Court Bench on the retirement of Mr. Justice Shand; from 1925 until 1947 he was stationed in Central Queensland, and for his last two years in Brisbane.

=== Last days ===
Mr. Justice Brennan died in the Mater Private Hospital, Brisbane, where he had been admitted several weeks previously, suffering from heart trouble. He was honoured by a State funeral and buried at Nudgee Cemetery.

== Family ==
Frank Brennan married Hanna Maria Gertrude Koenig, on 19 July 1922. Gertrude was a daughter of prominent Brisbane citizen Albert Koenig, a German Australian.

Mr. Justice Brennan left a wife, son Gerard, who was studying law, and daughters Anne (his associate) and Mary.

== See also ==
- Members of the Queensland Legislative Assembly, 1918–1920; 1920-1923; 1923-1926

== Further references ==
Malcolm Cope, 'Brennan, Frank Tenison (1884–1949)', Australian Dictionary of Biography, National Centre of Biography, Australian National University, https://adb.anu.edu.au/biography/brennan-frank-tenison-5348/text9043, accessed 24 May 2013.

Parliament of Queensland
| Preceded by James Tolmie | Member for Toowoomba; 1918–1925 | Succeeded by Evan Llewelyn |
