= Harry Coyne =

Australian politician

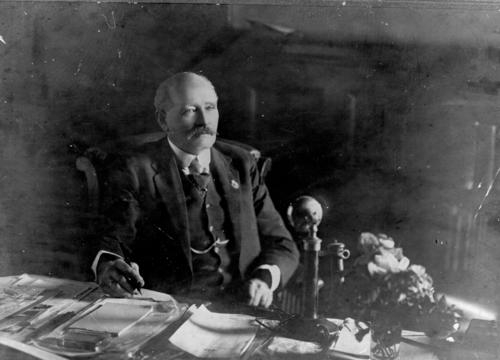

Member of the Queensland Legislative Assembly for Warrego
- In office 5 February 1908 – 31 July 1923
- Preceded by: Patrick Leahy
- Succeeded by: Randolph Bedford

Personal details
- Born: John Henry Coyne; 16 January 1865 Melbourne, Victoria, Australia
- Died: 12 June 1926 (aged 61) Townsville, Queensland, Australia
- Resting place: Toowong Cemetery
- Party: Labor
- Spouse: Mary Elizabeth Gordon (m. 1894; his death)
- Occupation: Shearer, Trade union organiser

John Henry Coyne (16 January 1865 – 12 June 1926) was an Australian politician who served as a Member of the Queensland Legislative Assembly for the Electoral district of Warrego from 1908 until 1923.

== Early life ==
John Henry Coyne was born on 16 January 1865 in Melbourne, Victoria, the son of John Henry Coyne and his wife Margaret (née Ryan). He left school at 16 and took up fencing, shearing, woolpressing, and many other professions. After finding his feet, he moved to Eulo, Queensland in 1890. He then married Mary Elizabeth Gordon (née Heath), a widow and had six children with her.

== Politics ==
Harry Coyne was elected to the Queensland Legislative Assembly at the 1908 election in the electoral district of Warrego. He held the seat until he retired on 31 July 1923. During that period, he was Chairman of Committees from 15 July 1915 to 12 October 1916, Secretary for Railways from 13 October 1916 to 30 April 1918, Secretary for Public Lands from 22 October 1919 to 12 November 1920, briefly Minister without Office from 12 November 1920 to 16 December 1920, and then again Secretary for Public Lands from 16 December 1920 to 2 July 1923.

Harry Coyne was the chairman of a number of subcommittees of the Queensland War Council including those concerned with Anzac Cottage Trust and the commemoration of Anzac Day. He was also involved in the construction of Anzac Avenue to Redcliffe.

== Later life ==
On 7 June 1926, Harry Coyne was the passenger in a taxi that hit an electric light pole outside the Excelsior Hotel in Flinders Street, Townsville; he was found lying in the street unconscious and was taken by ambulance to hospital where he was found to have a fractured skull. Without having recovered consciousness, Harry Coyne died on 12 June 1926 surrounded by his family. The taxi driver Otto Korn was also hospitalised but survived.

Harry Coyne was accorded the honour of a state funeral which was held at St Andrew's Presbyterian Church on the corner of Ann Street and Edward Street, Brisbane, on 16 June 1926, after which he was buried in Toowong Cemetery.

== See also ==
- Members of the Queensland Legislative Assembly, 1908–1909; 1909–1912; 1912–1915; 1915–1918; 1918–1920; 1920–1923; 1923–1926

Parliament of Queensland
Preceded by Patrick Leahy	Member for Warrego; 1908–1923	Succeeded by Randolph Bedford
