= Alfred Arthur James =

Australian politician

Alfred James

Member of the Queensland Legislative Assembly for Logan
- In office 16 March 1918 – 9 October 1920
- Preceded by: James Stodart
- Succeeded by: Reginald King

Personal details
- Born: Alfred Arthur James; 25 August 1887 Warragul, Victoria, Australia
- Died: 12 February 1938 (aged 50)
- Party: Labor
- Other political affiliations: Country Party
- Spouse: Eliese Ebert (m.1910)
- Occupation: Farmhand

Alfred Arthur James (25 August 1887 – 12 February 1938) was a member of the Queensland Legislative Assembly.

== Biography ==
James was born in Warragul, Victoria, the son of Samuel Arthur James and his wife Alice (née Cleak). He was educated in Warragul and after leaving school he worked as a farmhand. He then was a journalist and editor for the Producer in Caboolture.

On 30 April 1910, he married Eliese Ebert in Prahran and together had three daughters. James died in February 1938.

== Public career ==
James, representing the Labor Party, won the seat of Logan at the 1918 Queensland state election, defeating Reginald King, the National candidate. By the time of the 1920 state election, James had switched to the Country Party but lost to his 1918 opponent, Reginald King.

Parliament of Queensland
Preceded by James Stodart	Member for Logan; 1918–1920	Succeeded by Reginald King
