= William Field Lloyd =

Australian politician

William Lloyd

Member of the Queensland Legislative Assembly for Enoggera
- In office 22 May 1915 – 9 Oct 1920
- Preceded by: Richard Trout
- Succeeded by: James Kerr

Member of the Queensland Legislative Assembly for Kelvin Grove
- In office 12 May 1923 – 11 May 1929
- Preceded by: New seat
- Succeeded by: Richard Hill

Personal details
- Born: William Field Lloyd; 1873 Tenby, Wales
- Died: 29 May 1965 (aged 92) Brisbane, Queensland, Australia
- Party: Labor
- Spouse: Mabel Stack (m.1926 d.1978)
- Occupation: School teacher

William Field Lloyd (1873 – 29 May 1965) was a school teacher and member of the Queensland Legislative Assembly.

== Biography ==
Lloyd was born at Tenby, Wales, to parents David Lloyd and his wife Elizabeth (née Field). He came to Australia at an early age and was educated at Brisbane State School. He started out his working life as an apprentice printer but before long he found himself working as a school teacher at Charters Towers Normal School and Ithaca Creek State School. He then established and directed the Queensland Correspondence College.

On 8 December 1926 he married Mabel Stack (died 1978) at St Columb's Church of England, Clayfield and together had one son. He died in May 1965 and was cremated at Mount Thompson Crematorium.

== Political career ==
Lloyd, for the Labor Party won the seat of Enoggera at the 1915 Queensland state election after being defeated at the 1911 by-election and the 1912 state election. He was defeated in 1920 by James Kerr of the National Party.

In 1923, Lloyd won the new seat of Kelvin Grove and held it for six years before being defeated by the CPNP's Richard Hill.

Parliament of Queensland
Preceded by Richard Trout	Member for Enoggera; 1915–1920	Succeeded by James Kerr
New seat	Member for Kelvin Grove; 1923–1929	Succeeded by Richard Hill
