= George Farrell (politician) =

Australian politician

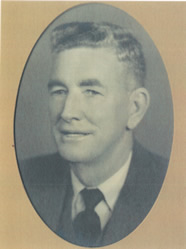

Member of the Queensland Legislative Assembly for Rockhampton
- In office 17 February 1923 – 11 May 1929
- Preceded by: Frank Forde
- Succeeded by: Thomas Dunlop

Personal details
- Born: George Pritchard Farrell; 29 December 1895 Eidsvold, Queensland, Australia
- Died: 25 July 1966 (aged 70) Brisbane, Queensland, Australia
- Party: Labor
- Spouse: Grace Katherine Barton (d.1939)
- Relations: David Farrell (brother)
- Occupation: School teacher

George Pritchard Farrell (29 December 1895 – 25 July 1966) was a member of the Queensland Legislative Assembly.

== Biography ==
Farrell was born in Eidsvold, Queensland, the son of Joseph Farrell and his wife Mary (née McLachlan) and educated at the Howard State School. He later became a school teacher at Howard and the Master of Central Boys' School in Rockhampton.

He was married to Grace Katherine Barton and died in July 1966.

His brother David Farrell was also a Member of the Queensland Legislative Assembly.

== Public career ==
Farrell was nominated by the Labor to be their candidate at the by-election to replace the previous member, future Prime Minister of Australia, Frank Forde, who had resigned to contest the 1922 federal election. Farrell won an intense and bitter campaign, defeating the United Party candidate, Mr W. Charlton and the independent National candidate, Mr C. Iredale.

During his time in parliament he was a very capable speaker, and according to James Larcombe, had never known any member of Parliament to show greater promise than George Farrell. He lost his seat at the 1929 Queensland state election to the independent, Thomas Dunlop.

Parliament of Queensland
Preceded by Frank Forde	Member for Rockhampton; 1923–1929	Succeeded by Thomas Dunlop
