= John Dash =

Australian politician (1882–1952)

The Honourable John Dash
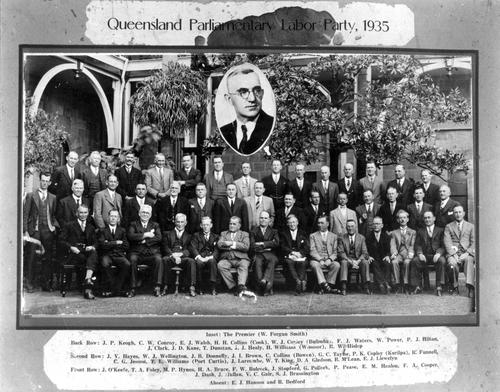
- Queensland Parliamentary Labor Party 1935 - Dash is on the front row, fourth from the right

Member of the Queensland Legislative Assembly for Mundingburra
- In office 9 October 1920 – 15 April 1944
- Preceded by: Thomas Foley
- Succeeded by: Tom Aikens

Personal details
- Born: John Dash; 31 October 1882 Blackall, Queensland, Australia
- Died: 1 January 1952 (aged 69) Brisbane, Queensland, Australia
- Resting place: Nudgee Cemetery
- Party: Labor
- Spouse: Violet Alone (m.1911 d.1967)
- Occupation: Miner

John Dash (31 October 1882 – 1 January 1952) was a member of the Queensland Legislative Assembly.

== Biography ==
Dash was born in Blackall, Queensland, the son of John Dash Snr, a German migrant, and his Irish-born wife Margaret (née Mahoney) and was educated at Blackall State School. He began his working life as a stockman at the Fort Constantine station before going to Mount Elliott on the Cloncurry copper fields.

Dash married Violet Alone (died 1967) in 1911 and together had a son and three daughters. He was seriously injured in a rail motor accident in September 1932 from which he never fully recovered. He later developed Parkinson's disease and after a prolonged illness died in Brisbane in January 1952. He was accorded a state funeral which proceeded from St Stephen's Cathedral, Brisbane to the Nudgee Cemetery.

== Public career ==
Dash became involved in the trade union movement while working the copper fields in the Cloncurry district. The north-western miners' unions merged in 1909 to form the Western Workers' Association of which Dash was its secretary. The next year the unions further merged to form the Amalgamated Workers' Association and Dash was the northern organizer for the union. In this role he was involved in several disputes including the 1911 sugar strike, the 1912 general strike, the Hampden lockout of 1913, the railway strike in 1917, and the Townsville meatworks strike in 1919.

At the 1920 Queensland state election he won the seat of Mundingburra for the Labor Party and represented the electorate for the next 24 years. He was made Minister for Transport in June 1932 but it was just three months later that he was seriously injured in the rail motor accident, something that he never fully recovered from and forced his resignation from the ministry in 1939. His worsening health, both physical and mental, plus the splitting of his political base over the Aid-to-Russia issue led to his defeat at the pre-selection ballot for the 1944 state election.

During his seven years as the Minister for Transport, Dash introduced just three pieces of legislation to the parliament. In the 1930s, Dash dispensed political patronage to unionists and party members in his constituency by placing them in jobs on the northern railways which helped his re-election in 1941.

Parliament of Queensland
Preceded by Thomas Foley	Member for Mundingburra; 1920–1944	Succeeded by Tom Aikens
