= Electoral district of Pittsworth =

Pittsworth Queensland—Legislative Assembly
- State: Queensland
- Created: 1912
- Abolished: 1923
- Namesake: Pittsworth, Queensland
- Demographic: Rural
- Coordinates: 27°43′S 151°38′E

The electoral district of Pittsworth was a Legislative Assembly electorate in the state of Queensland, Australia.

== History ==
Pittsworth was created in the 1910 redistribution, taking effect at the 1912 state election, and existed until the 1923 state election. Most of its area was based on the Cambooya which was abolished at the 1912 election.

When Pittsworth was abolished in 1923, its area was incorporated into the district of Aubigny.

== Members ==
The following people were elected in the seat of Pittsworth:

Member	Party	Term
Donald MacKintosh	Ministerial	27 Apr 1912 – 22 May 1915
Percy Bayley	Farmers’ Union	22 May 1915 – 9 Oct 1920
Cecil Roberts	Country	9 Oct 1920 – 12 May 1923
