= James Stevingstone Kerr =

Australian politician (1889–1960)

James Kerr

Member of the Queensland Legislative Assembly for Enoggera
- In office 9 Oct 1920 – 11 Jun 1932
- Preceded by: William Lloyd
- Succeeded by: George Taylor

Personal details
- Born: James Stevingstone Kerr; 1889 Rosewood, Queensland, Australia
- Died: 15 September 1960 (aged 70 or 71) Toowoomba, Queensland, Australia
- Party: CPNP
- Other political affiliations: National, United Party
- Spouse: Marjorie Atkinson (m.1922 d.1946)
- Occupation: Clerk

James Stevingstone Kerr (1889 – 15 September 1960) was a clerk and member of the Queensland Legislative Assembly.

== Biography ==
Kerr was born at Rosewood, Queensland, to parents John Kerr and his wife Mary (née Caldwell). He was educated at Brisbane Normal School and Brisbane Grammar School. He was the head office clerk at Queensland Railways and in World War I he was a Captain with the 26th Battalion. On his return to Australia he became the State Secretary of the Returned Services League.

On 20 April 1922 he married Marjorie Atkinson (died 1946) and together had one son and one daughter. He died in Toowoomba in 1960.

== Political career ==
Kerr, at first a member of the Nationalist Party, won the seat of Enoggera in 1920, defeating the sitting Labor member, William Lloyd. He held the seat until his defeat in 1932 by the Labor Party's George Taylor. During his time in parliament he was also a member of the United Party and the CPNP.

Parliament of Queensland
| Preceded by William Lloyd | Member for Enoggera; 1920–1932 | Succeeded by George Taylor |
