= Reginald King =

Australian politician (1869–1955)

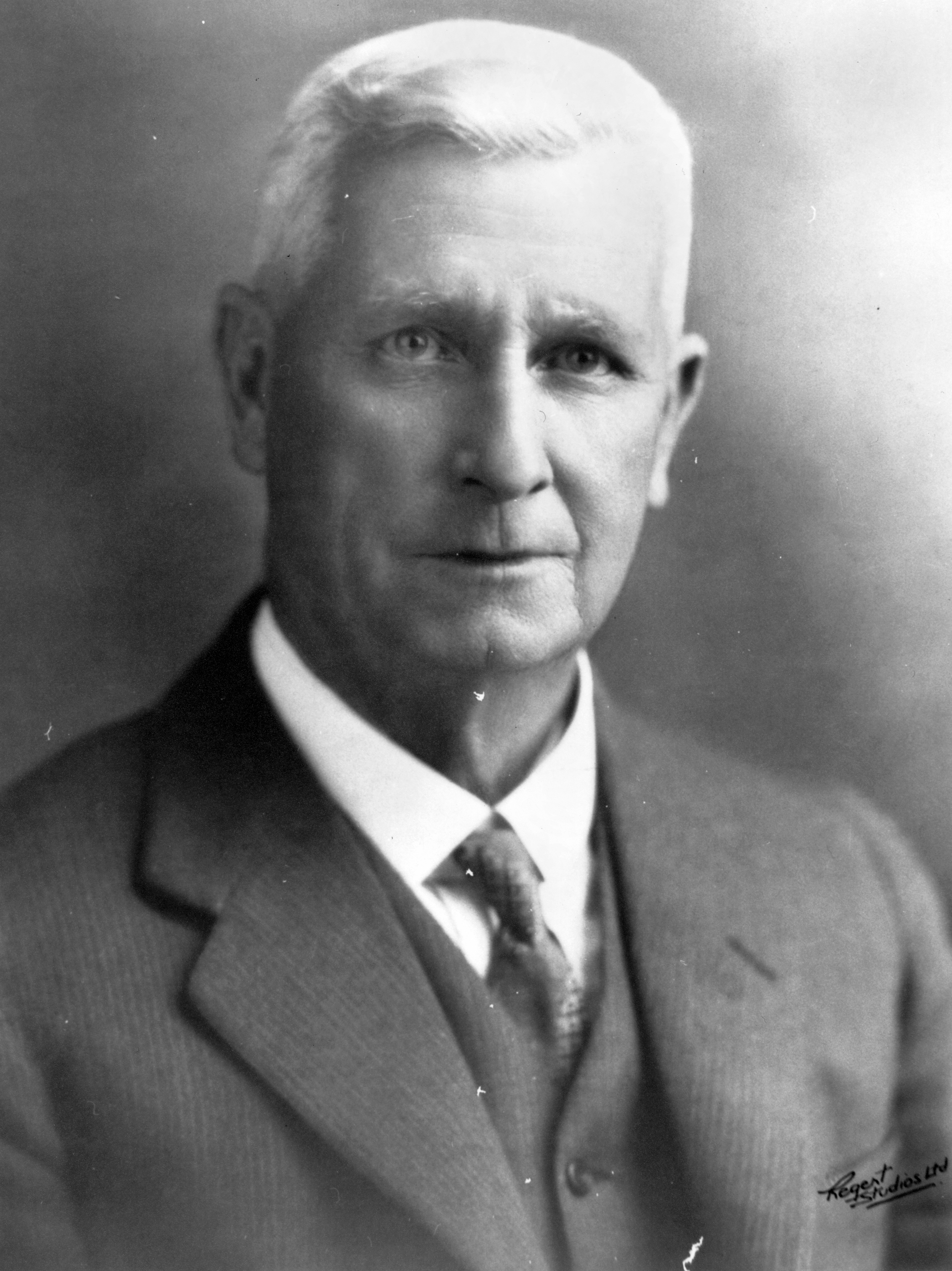
- Reginald MacDonnell King, 1929

Member of the Queensland Legislative Assembly for Logan
- In office 9 October 1920 – 8 May 1935
- Preceded by: Alfred James
- Succeeded by: John Brown

Personal details
- Born: Reginald MacDonnell King; 9 April 1869 Brisbane, Queensland Colony, British Empire
- Died: 7 September 1955 (aged 86) Brisbane, Queensland, Australia
- Party: CPNP
- Other political affiliations: National; Queensland United
- Spouse: Helena Mary Hewson (m. 1895–1955)
- Children: 5
- Parent(s): Thomas Mulhall King; Jane Maria
- Education: Brisbane Grammar School
- Occupation: Solicitor; Politician

Reginald MacDonnell King (1869–1955) was a solicitor politician in Queensland, Australia. He was a Member of the Queensland Legislative Assembly.

== Early life ==
Reginald MacDonnell King was born on 9 April 1869 in South Brisbane, the son of Thomas Mulhall King (Auditor-General of Queensland 1901–06) and his wife Jane Maria (née Macdonnell). He was educated at South Brisbane State School. In 1883, he won a scholarship to Brisbane Grammar School for his further studies.

King trained as a solicitor articled to Alfred Glassford Unmack. In 1893 he entered a partnership with George Hoydon Howard Gill, specialising in local government law.

== Politics ==
Reginald King was a member of the Coorparoo Shire Council from 1896 to 1927, being elected Chairman on 9 times from 1898.

Reginald King was elected to the Queensland Legislative Assembly in the electoral district of Logan at the 1920 election. He held the seat until 11 May 1935 (the 1935 election), when he was defeated because of the redistribution of the Logan electorate.

During this time, he was a member of the National Party, the Queensland United Party and the Country and Progressive National Party. He was Secretary for Public Works and Public Instruction from 21 May 1929 to 17 June 1932.

== Later life ==
In retirement, Reginald King was a keen gardener. Reginald King died on 7 September 1955 in Brisbane.

Parliament of Queensland
Preceded by Alfred James	Member for Logan; 1920–1935	Succeeded by John Brown
