= Electoral district of Musgrave =

Musgrave Queensland—Legislative Assembly
- State: Queensland
- Created: 1886
- Abolished: 1923
- Namesake: Musgrave

Musgrave was an electoral district of the Legislative Assembly in the Australian state of Queensland from 1886 to 1923.

The district was initially created when the Electoral district of Townsville was split by the Additional Members Act of 1885. In 1888, Musgrave was replaced by Herbert, the name Musgrave was then assigned to a seat in the Bundaberg district.

== Members for Musgrave ==
Member	Party	Term
Robert Philp	Ministerial	5 Jan 1886 – 9 May 1888
William O'Connell	Ministerial	9 May 1888 – 4 Mar 1903
John White	Ministerial	4 Mar 1903 – 27 Aug 1904
Charles Nielson	Labor	27 Aug 1904 – 18 May 1907
John White	Ministerial	18 May 1907 – 22 May 1915
Thomas Armfield	Labor	22 May 1915 – 9 Oct 1920
Henry Cattermull	Country	9 Oct 1920 – 12 May 1923

== See also ==
- Electoral districts of Queensland
- Members of the Queensland Legislative Assembly by year
- Category:Members of the Queensland Legislative Assembly by name
