= Northern Country Party =

Former political party in Queensland, Australia

The Northern Country Party was an Australian political party operating in the state of Queensland during the 1920s. It had a separate organisation from the wider Country Party in the state, although the two were connected. In 1923, its organisation merged into the Country Party, although its two members of the Queensland Parliament instead became members of the new Queensland United Party.
