= Cecil Roberts (politician) =

Australian politician (1877–1961)

Member of the Queensland Legislative Assembly for Pittsworth
- In office 9 October 1920 – 11 May 1923
- Preceded by: Percy Bayley
- Succeeded by: Seat abolished

Personal details
- Born: James Henry Cecil Roberts; 1 June 1877 London, England
- Died: 14 September 1961 (aged 84) Toowoomba, Queensland, Australia
- Party: Country Party
- Spouse: Florence Alice Blackwell (m.1901)
- Education: Hawkesbury Agricultural College
- Occupation: Farmer

James Henry Cecil Roberts (1 June 1877 – 14 September 1961) was a member of the Queensland Legislative Assembly.

== Biography ==
Roberts was born in London, England, the son of Dr Edwin Roberts and his wife Eliza (née Taylor). He was educated privately and also attended Toowoomba Grammar School and the Hawkesbury Agricultural College. He was a farmer at Croxley, Kingsthorpe on the Darling Downs in 1898 which by 1920 he had extended to 3500 acres.

On 27 March 1901 he married Florence Alice Blackwell in Sydney and together had two sons. Roberts died at Toowoomba in September 1961.

== Public life ==
Roberts, a member of the Country Party, won the seat of Pittsworth in the Queensland Legislative Assembly at the 1920 state election. Pittsworth was abolished before the 1923 state election and Roberts, by now an Independent Country Party member, contested the seat of Cunningham but was easily defeated.

He was a founder of the Darling Downs Farmers' Union in 1911 and president from 1912 to 1919. From 1931–1941 he was a director of the Downs Co-operative Dairy Farmers' Association. Roberts was also a committee member of the Oakey Agricultural Society and the Royal Agricultural Society.

Parliament of Queensland
Preceded by Percy Bayley	Member for Pittsworth; 1920–1923	Abolished
