= Electoral district of Paddington (Queensland) =

Former state electoral district of Queensland, Australia

Paddington Queensland—Legislative Assembly
- State: Queensland
- Created: 1912
- Abolished: 1932
- Namesake: Paddington, Queensland
- Demographic: Metropolitan
- Coordinates: 27°27′50″S 153°0′30″E

The electoral district of Paddington was a Legislative Assembly electorate in the state of Queensland, Australia.

Paddington was created in the 1911 redistribution, taking effect at the 1912 state election, and existed until the 1932 state election. Most of its area was based on the Brisbane North which was abolished at the 1912 election. When Paddington was abolished in 1932, its area was incorporated into the districts of Brisbane and Baroona.

The following people were elected in the seat of Paddington:

Member	Party	Term
John Fihelly	Labor	27 Apr 1912 – 7 Feb 1922
Alfred James Jones	Labor	18 Mar 1922 – 11 Jun 1932
