= William Deacon (politician) =

Australian politician

Member of the Queensland Legislative Assembly for Cunningham
- In office 9 October 1920 – 25 December 1943
- Preceded by: Francis Grayson
- Succeeded by: Malcolm McIntyre

Personal details
- Born: William Arthur Deacon; 4 February 1872 Allora, Queensland, Australia
- Died: 25 December 1943 (aged 71) Allora, Queensland, Australia
- Resting place: Allora Cemetery
- Party: Country Party
- Other political affiliations: Farmer's Union, CPNP
- Spouse: Ada Florence Dougall (m.1922 d.1977)
- Occupation: Farmer, horse breeder

William Arthur Deacon (4 February 1872 – 25 December 1943) was a farmer and member of the Queensland Legislative Assembly.

== Biography ==
Deacon was born at Allora, Queensland, to parents William Deacon and his wife Ann Amelia (née Bray) and educated at the Allora State School. He became a farmer and in 1910 took over his father's farm in Allora. He also liked to breed Clydesdale horses and grow grapes.

7 Jun 1922, Deacon married Ada Florence Dougall (died 1977) and together had one son and one daughter. He died at his Allora home in 1943 and was buried in the Allora Cemetery.

== Political career ==
Replacing the retiring Francis Grayson, Deacon won the seat of Cunningham at the 1920 state elections for the CPNP. He was Secretary for Public Lands 1929–1932 in the Moore Ministry. He remained the member until his death on Christmas Day in 1943.

Parliament of Queensland
| Preceded by Francis Grayson | Member for Cunningham; 1920–1943 | Succeeded by Malcolm McIntyre |
