= Frederick Lancelot Nott =

Australian politician

Frederick Nott
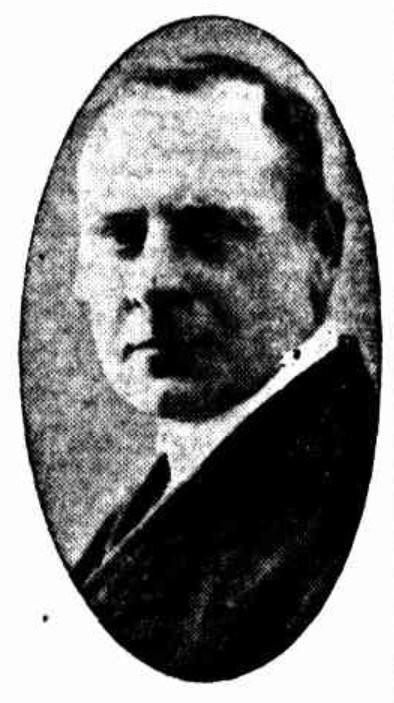
- Frederick Lancelot Nott, circa 1927

Member of the Queensland Legislative Assembly for Stanley
- In office 9 October 1920 – 5 February 1927
- Preceded by: Henry Somerset
- Succeeded by: Ernest Grimstone

Personal details
- Born: Frederick Lancelot Nott; 25 March 1874 East Maitland, New South Wales, Australia
- Died: 5 December 1927 (aged 53) Clayfield, Queensland, Australia
- Resting place: South Brisbane Cemetery
- Party: Country Party, Country and Progressive National Party
- Spouse: May Evelyn Wright
- Relations: Lewis Nott (brother)
- Education: Braunschweig University of Technology
- Occupation: Agricultural chemist, Dairy farmer

Frederick Lancelot Nott (25 March 1874 – 5 December 1927) was a politician in Queensland, Australia and a Member of the Queensland Legislative Assembly from 1920 to 1927.

== Early life and education ==
Nott was born in East Maitland, New South Wales, the son of Frederick Lewis Nott and Jean (née Blair). His brother Lewis Windermere Nott was later a member of the Parliament of Australia.

He was educated at the Brisbane Normal School, the Maryborough Grammar School (Queensland) and the Couerwell Academy (New South Wales). He was awarded a diploma in agriculture from the Hawkesbury Agricultural College in March 1893.

After leaving the college, he specialised in agricultural chemistry, then went to Braunschweig University of Technology in Germany to further his studies in analytical chemistry and technology, specialising in agricultural and sugar chemistry, resulting in the award of a science degree from that institution.

== Agriculture and mining ==
Having returned to Queensland, in the late 1890s, he was working as a chemist on his father's sugar farm at Windermere, Queensland (near Bundaberg). He married May Evelyn Wright on 12 June 1901 at the Nott family home at Windermere; their only child (an unnamed daughter) died shortly after birth in 1904.

Between about 1898 and 1903 Nott was involved in assaying and managing a cyanide works for the extraction of gold at Nelson (near Cairns, Queensland).

For about two years, Nott worked as a chemistry demonstrator and assistant analytical chemist at the Queensland Agricultural College at Gatton under Mr. J. Bailnich.

Leaving Gatton, Nott went on to reorganise the manufacture of sugar at the Central Mill at Gin Gin, Queensland. From there, he went as chemist to the Central Mill at Mulgrave, Queensland for eight years.

By 1912 he had established his own sugar farm called the Grange Plantation at Woongarra near Bundaberg.

While at Bundaberg, Nott took an active interest in shire council and other public matters, in the butter factory directorate, and the control of the Bundaberg Rum Distillery (his late father was one of the founders). Later the families' sugar mill and plantation, Windemere Estate was sold to the Millaquin Sugar Company, and his own property, the Grange Plantation, to the Fairymeade Sugar Company.

Leaving Bundaberg, Nott took up sheep-raising and wool-growing in the Charleville, Queensland area for a number of years, and after selling out there went to the Toogoolawah district in Queensland. While there he became active in trying to improve the price of milk, the conditions of the farmers, and the supply of milk to the Nestlé Company.

== Politics ==
Nott was approached to contest the Stanley electorate in the Queensland Legislative Assembly as a Country and Progressive National Party candidate against the Labour party in 1920. He was elected on 9 October 1920 and remained the member for Stanley until his death on 5 December 1927.

== Death ==
Nott died at his residence "Calminda", Riverton Street, Clayfield in Brisbane on 5 December 1927. He is buried in South Brisbane Cemetery at Dutton Park. His wife May later remarried to Alfred John Raymond. but her ashes are buried with Frederick Nott.

Parliament of Queensland
Preceded by Henry Somerset	Member for Stanley; 1920–1927	Succeeded by Ernest Grimstone
