= Electoral district of Queenton =

Queenton Queensland—Legislative Assembly
- State: Queensland
- Created: 1912
- Abolished: 1932
- Namesake: Queenton, Queensland
- Demographic: Metropolitan
- Coordinates: 20°05′S 146°17′E

The electoral district of Queenton was a Legislative Assembly electorate in the state of Queensland, Australia.

== History ==
Queenton was created in the 1910 redistribution, taking effect at the 1912 state election, and existed until the 1932 state election. It was based on the eastern part of Charters Towers and surrounding rural area.

When Queenton was abolished in 1932, its area was incorporated into the district of Charters Towers.

== Members ==
The following people were elected in the seat of Queenton:

Member	Party	Term
Vernon Winstanley	Labor	27 Apr 1912 – 11 Jun 1932
