= Jim Edwards (Queensland politician) =

Australian politician (1879–1952)

Member of the Queensland Legislative Assembly for Nanango
- In office 9 October 1920 – 3 May 1947
- Preceded by: Robert Hodge
- Succeeded by: Joh Bjelke-Petersen

Personal details
- Born: James Braidwood Edwards; 3 February 1879 Hamilton, Victoria, Australia
- Died: 9 July 1952 (aged 73) Kingaroy, Queensland, Australia
- Resting place: Taabinga Cemetery
- Party: Country Party
- Spouse: Mary Emma Adler (m.1903 d.1967)
- Occupation: Farmer

James Braidwood Edwards (3 February 1879 – 9 July 1952) was a member of the Queensland Legislative Assembly.

== Biography ==
Edwards was born at Hamilton, Victoria, the son of David Edwards and his wife Jane Drew (née Henderson). He was educated in Warracknabeal and arrived in Queensland in 1898 where he took up farming on the Darling Downs. He moved to the Kingaroy district in 1908 where he remained for the rest of his life and took up dairy farming.

In 1903 he married Mary Emma Adler (died 1967) and together had five sons and four daughters. He died in July 1952 and his funeral moved from the Kingaroy Church of England to the Taabinga Cemetery.

== Public career ==
Edwards won the seat of Nanango at the 1920 Queensland state election, beating fellow Country Party member Robert Hodge, who was also the sitting member for the seat. He went on to represent the electorate until the 1947 Queensland state election when he retired from politics. His position was taken over by Joh Bjelke-Petersen, who went on to be the Premier of Queensland for a record term.

Although he spent over 26 years in parliament, he was only on the government side for three years. During those three years he was the Chairman of the Public Works Committee. From 1936 until his retirement in 1947 Edwards was the Opposition Whip. He was also a member of the Kingaroy Shire Council.

Parliament of Queensland
Preceded by Robert Hodge	Member for Nanango; 1920–1947	Succeeded by Joh Bjelke-Petersen
