= Richard Warren (Australian politician) =

Australian politician

Member of the Queensland Legislative Assembly for Murrumba
- In office 16 March 1918 – 11 June 1932
- Preceded by: James Forsyth
- Succeeded by: Frank Nicklin

Personal details
- Born: Richard James Warren; 12 March 1869 Barkstead, Victoria, Australia
- Died: 5 August 1940 (aged 71) Brisbane, Queensland, Australia
- Resting place: Toowong Cemetery
- Party: Country and Progressive National Party
- Other political affiliations: National, Country Party, United
- Spouse(s): Louisa Jeffery (m.1898 d.1927), Maude Ellen Parry (m.1928)
- Occupation: Wheat farmer

Richard James Warren (12 March 1869 – 5 August 1940) was a member of the Queensland Legislative Assembly.

He was born at Barkstead, a small town near Ballarat in Victoria, the son of Humphrey Warren and his wife Fanny (née Eldridge). He was a wheat farmer and pastoralist in New South Wales and Chinchilla in Queensland. In 1915 he was with the 26th Battalion of the First Australian Imperial Force and was discharged due to sickness during the Gallipoli Campaign.

Warren married Louisa Jeffery in 1898 in Sydney. Louisa died in 1927 and the next year he married Maude Ellen Parry in Brisbane. Warren died in Brisbane in 1940 and was buried in the Toowong Cemetery.

== Public career ==
Warren, at first representing the National Party, won the seat of Murrumba at the 1918 Queensland state election, easily defeating the Labor candidate. He also represented the Country Party, United Party, and finally the Country and Progressive National Party during his time in the parliament. He went on to be the member for Murrumba until his retirement from politics at the 1932 state election.

Parliament of Queensland
Preceded by James Forsyth	Member for Murrumba; 1918–1932	Succeeded by Frank Nicklin
