= Henry Cattermull =

Australian politician

Member of the Queensland Legislative Assembly for Musgrave
- In office 9 October 1920 – 12 May 1923
- Preceded by: John White
- Succeeded by: Seat Abolished

Personal details
- Born: Henry Albert Cattermull; March 1871 Suffolk, England
- Died: 30 August 1935 (aged 64) Bundaberg, Queensland, Australia
- Resting place: Bundaberg Cemetery
- Party: Country Party
- Spouse: Agatha Turner (m.1890 d.1956)
- Occupation: Sugar grower

Henry Albert Cattermull (March 1871 – 30 August 1935) was a member of the Queensland Legislative Assembly.

== Early life ==
Cattermull was born at Suffolk, England, the son of Henry Cattermull and his wife Catherine (née Wills). He was a sugar grower and later on, a partner in the Sunnyside Mill at Bundaberg.

On the 13 December 1890 he married Agatha Turner (died 1956) and together they had one son and six daughters. Cattermull died at Bundaberg in August 1931 and was buried in the Bundaberg General Cemetery.

== Public life ==
Cattermull, representing the Country Party, won the seat of Musgrave in the Queensland Assembly at the 1920 Queensland state election. He only held the seat for one term as Musgrave was abolished for the 1923 Queensland state election; he was defeated at that election contesting Bundaberg.

In addition to his time in state parliament he was also a member of the Woongarra Shire Council in 1896-1921 including eighteen of those years as chairman and Cattermull was also an alderman in the Bundaberg City Council.

Parliament of Queensland
Preceded by John White	Member for Musgrave; 1920–1923	Abolished
