= Results of the 1926 Queensland state election =

Queensland state election, 8 May 1926 Legislative Assembly << 1923–1929 >>
Enrolled voters	452,008^{[1]}				
Votes cast	401,055		Turnout	88.73%	+6.50
Informal votes	4,927		Informal	1.23%	+0.06
Summary of votes by party
Party	Primary votes	%	Swing	Seats	Change
Labor	189,968	47.96%	–0.18	43	± 0
CPNP	192,043	48.48%	+1.53	28	– 1
Primary Producers	7,749	1.95%	+0.66	1	+ 1
Independent	6,368	1.61%	–2.02	0	± 0
Total	396,128			72	

This is a list of electoral district results for the 1926 Queensland state election.

At the time, the voting system in Queensland was based on contingency voting, which was similar to the modern optional preferential voting system. In electorates with 3 or more candidates, preferences were not distributed if a candidate received more than 50% of the primary vote.

If none received more than 50%, all except the top two candidates were eliminated from the count and their preferences distributed between the two leaders, with the one receiving the most votes declared the winner.

== Results by electoral district ==
=== Albert ===
1926 Queensland state election: Albert
Party	Candidate	Votes	%	±%
CPNP	John Appel	4,736	68.8	−31.2
Labor	William Lake	2,071	30.1	+30.1
Independent	Edwin Wilkins	81	1.2	+1.2
Total formal votes		6,888	98.6	
Informal votes		95	1.4	
Turnout		6,983	89.0	
CPNP hold		Swing	N/A	

=== Aubigny ===
1926 Queensland state election: Aubigny
Party	Candidate	Votes	%	±%
CPNP	Arthur Moore	3,877	69.5	+10.4
Labor	John Moir	1,700	30.5	−10.4
Total formal votes		5,577	99.2	+0.1
Informal votes		47	0.8	−0.1
Turnout		5,624	92.7	+5.0
CPNP hold		Swing	+10.4	

=== Balonne ===
1926 Queensland state election: Balonne
Party	Candidate	Votes	%	±%
Labor	Edward Land	2,271	56.9	−5.7
CPNP	Ted Maher	1,721	43.1	+5.7
Total formal votes		3,992	99.4	+0.5
Informal votes		25	0.6	−0.5
Turnout		4,017	78.5	+11.7
Labor hold		Swing	−5.7	

==== By-election ====
- This by-election was caused by the death of Edward Land. It was held on 6 August 1927.

1927 Balonne state by-election
Party	Candidate	Votes	%	±%
Labor	Samuel Brassington	1,760	59.7	+2.8
CPNP	Ted Maher	1,190	40.3	−2.8
Total formal votes		2,950		
Informal votes				
Turnout				
Labor hold		Swing	+2.8	

=== Barcoo ===
1926 Queensland state election: Barcoo
Party	Candidate	Votes	%	±%
Labor	Frank Bulcock	unopposed		
Labor hold		Swing		

=== Bowen ===
1926 Queensland state election: Bowen
Party	Candidate	Votes	%	±%
Labor	Charles Collins	3,273	57.6	−5.4
CPNP	Frederick Woods	2,410	42.4	+5.4
Total formal votes		5,683	98.9	−0.3
Informal votes		65	1.1	+0.3
Turnout		5,748	89.8	+12.5
Labor hold		Swing	−5.4	

=== Bremer ===
1926 Queensland state election: Bremer
Party	Candidate	Votes	%	±%
Labor	Frank Cooper	3,888	66.2	+10.6
CPNP	Kenneth McGill	1,988	33.8	−9.7
Total formal votes		5,876	98.9	+0.4
Informal votes		68	1.1	−0.4
Turnout		5,944	94.4	+1.8
Labor hold		Swing	N/A	

=== Brisbane ===
1926 Queensland state election: Brisbane
Party	Candidate	Votes	%	±%
Labor	Mick Kirwan	2,723	59.8	0.0
CPNP	Fred O'Keefe	1,832	40.2	0.0
Total formal votes		4,555	98.4	−0.6
Informal votes		72	1.6	+0.6
Turnout		4,627	78.5	+4.5
Labor hold		Swing	0.0	

=== Bulimba ===
1926 Queensland state election: Bulimba
Party	Candidate	Votes	%	±%
Labor	Harry Wright	5,101	55.6	+1.8
CPNP	Allan Stanton	3,663	39.9	−5.0
Independent Labor	John Costin	411	4.5	+4.5
Total formal votes		9,175	98.8	−0.5
Informal votes		114	1.2	+0.5
Turnout		9,289	93.7	+9.5
Labor hold		Swing	N/A	

=== Bundaberg ===
1926 Queensland state election: Bundaberg
Party	Candidate	Votes	%	±%
Labor	George Barber	4,158	59.4	+0.4
CPNP	William Gavegan	2,844	40.6	−0.4
Total formal votes		7,002	98.9	−0.4
Informal votes		76	1.1	+0.4
Turnout		7,078	92.0	+4.8
Labor hold		Swing	+0.4	

=== Buranda ===
1926 Queensland state election: Buranda
Party	Candidate	Votes	%	±%
Labor	Ted Hanson	3,971	60.3	+3.7
CPNP	Henry Quinn	2,619	39.7	−3.7
Total formal votes		6,590	99.3	−0.1
Informal votes		48	0.7	+0.1
Turnout		6,638	92.3	+2.9
Labor hold		Swing	+3.7	

=== Burke ===
1926 Queensland state election: Burke
Party	Candidate	Votes	%	±%
Labor	Darby Riordan	unopposed		
Labor hold		Swing		

=== Burnett ===
1926 Queensland state election: Burnett
Party	Candidate	Votes	%	±%
CPNP	Bernard Corser	3,763	62.2	+4.4
Labor	Bill Baxter	2,283	37.8	−2.0
Total formal votes		6,046	98.3	−0.5
Informal votes		103	1.7	+0.5
Turnout		6,149	91.0	+4.1
CPNP hold		Swing	N/A	

==== By-election ====
- This by-election was caused by the resignation of Bernard Corser, who entered Federal politics. It was held on 13 October 1928.

1928 Burnett state by-election
Party	Candidate	Votes	%	±%
CPNP	Robert Boyd	unopposed		
CPNP hold		Swing		

=== Burrum ===
1926 Queensland state election: Burrum
Party	Candidate	Votes	%	±%
CPNP	William Brand	3,311	55.0	+4.4
Labor	John Laurison	2,713	45.0	−4.4
Total formal votes		6,024	98.9	−0.4
Informal votes		65	1.1	+0.4
Turnout		6,089	89.9	+6.1
CPNP hold		Swing	+4.4	

=== Cairns ===
1926 Queensland state election: Cairns
Party	Candidate	Votes	%	±%
Labor	William McCormack	4,544	66.4	+7.6
CPNP	Thomas Boylan	2,302	33.6	−7.6
Total formal votes		6,846	99.1	+0.8
Informal votes		60	0.9	−0.8
Turnout		6,906	88.5	+6.0
Labor hold		Swing	+7.6	

=== Carnarvon ===
1926 Queensland state election: Carnarvon
Party	Candidate	Votes	%	±%
CPNP	Edward Costello	3,054	53.9	+0.7
Labor	Adolphus Baker	2,607	46.1	−0.7
Total formal votes		5,661	99.1	−0.5
Informal votes		54	0.9	+0.5
Turnout		5,715	88.0	+7.0
CPNP hold		Swing	+0.7	

=== Charters Towers ===
1926 Queensland state election: Charters Towers
Party	Candidate	Votes	%	±%
Labor	William Wellington	2,251	62.3	+0.6
CPNP	William Clark	1,365	37.7	−0.6
Total formal votes		3,616	98.8	−0.1
Informal votes		42	1.2	+0.1
Turnout		3,658	88.6	+2.9
Labor hold		Swing	+0.6	

=== Chillagoe ===
1926 Queensland state election: Chillagoe
Party	Candidate	Votes	%	±%
Labor	John O'Keefe	2,537	67.5	+3.2
CPNP	Bernard Hayes	1,222	32.5	+4.2
Total formal votes		3,759	98.8	+1.0
Informal votes		47	1.2	−1.0
Turnout		3,806	79.1	−1.9
Labor hold		Swing	N/A	

=== Cook ===
1926 Queensland state election: Cook
Party	Candidate	Votes	%	±%
Labor	Harry Ryan	2,422	62.0	+10.2
CPNP	Francis Williams	1,760	38.0	−10.2
Total formal votes		3,909	98.5	−0.5
Informal votes		59	1.5	+0.5
Turnout		3,968	86.2	+9.3
Labor hold		Swing	+10.2	

=== Cooroora ===
1926 Queensland state election: Cooroora
Party	Candidate	Votes	%	±%
CPNP	Harry Walker	unopposed		
CPNP hold		Swing		

=== Cunningham ===
1926 Queensland state election: Cunningham
Party	Candidate	Votes	%	±%
CPNP	William Deacon	3,974	69.1	+26.4
Labor	Edward Doyle	1,779	30.9	−5.2
Total formal votes		5,753	99.4	+1.6
Informal votes		32	0.6	−1.6
Turnout		5,785	85.2	−3.8
CPNP hold		Swing	+7.4	

=== Dalby ===
1926 Queensland state election: Dalby
Party	Candidate	Votes	%	±%
Primary Producers	Wilfred Russell	2,347	41.4	+41.4
Labor	Harold Francis	1,762	31.1	−6.6
CPNP	William Vowles	1,563	27.6	−21.2
Total formal votes		5,672	98.9	+1.0
Informal votes		64	1.1	−1.0
Turnout		5,736	91.2	+6.5
Two-candidate-preferred result
Primary Producers	Wilfred Russell	3,529	65.7	+65.7
Labor	Harold Francis	1,842	34.3	+7.2
Primary Producers gain from CPNP		Swing	N/A	

=== Eacham ===
1926 Queensland state election: Eacham
Party	Candidate	Votes	%	±%
Labor	Cornelius Ryan	2,965	51.5	−48.5
CPNP	George Duffy	2,794	48.5	+48.5
Total formal votes		5,759	97.6	
Informal votes		141	2.4	
Turnout		5,900	85.0	
Labor hold		Swing	N/A	

=== East Toowoomba ===
1926 Queensland state election: East Toowoomba
Party	Candidate	Votes	%	±%
CPNP	Robert Roberts	3,827	61.8	+0.2
Labor	John Herbert	2,369	38.2	−0.2
Total formal votes		6,196	99.2	+0.1
Informal votes		52	0.8	−0.1
Turnout		6,248	89.1	+11.2
CPNP hold		Swing	+0.2	

=== Enoggera ===
1926 Queensland state election: Enoggera
Party	Candidate	Votes	%	±%
CPNP	Jim Kerr	5,485	61.3	+2.6
Labor	Hurtle Patterson	3,463	38.7	−2.6
Total formal votes		8,948	99.2	−0.4
Informal votes		71	0.8	+0.4
Turnout		9,019	93.2	+9.5
CPNP hold		Swing	+2.6	

=== Fassifern ===
1926 Queensland state election: Fassifern
Party	Candidate	Votes	%	±%
CPNP	Ernest Bell	3,264	53.1	+0.9
Independent Country	Tom Plunkett	2,885	46.9	+46.9
Total formal votes		6,149	99.4	+0.6
Informal votes		34	0.6	−0.6
Turnout		6,183	87.1	+4.6
CPNP hold		Swing	+0.9	

=== Fitzroy ===
1926 Queensland state election: Fitzroy
Party	Candidate	Votes	%	±%
Labor	Harry Hartley	3,787	58.4	+6.0
CPNP	Frank Dawson	2,699	41.6	−6.0
Total formal votes		6,486	98.4	−0.6
Informal votes		107	1.6	+0.6
Turnout		6,593	84.0	+2.7
Labor hold		Swing	+6.0	

=== Flinders ===
1926 Queensland state election: Flinders
Party	Candidate	Votes	%	±%
Labor	John Mullan	1,342	65.9	+3.0
CPNP	Neville Sturzaker	695	34.1	−3.0
Total formal votes		2,037	99.3	+0.1
Informal votes		15	0.7	−0.1
Turnout		2,052	74.9	+26.3
Labor hold		Swing	+3.0	

=== Fortitude Valley ===
1926 Queensland state election: Fortitude Valley
Party	Candidate	Votes	%	±%
Labor	Thomas Wilson	3,862	62.8	+1.0
CPNP	Percival Hooper	2,286	37.2	−1.0
Total formal votes		6,148	99.2	−0.1
Informal votes		47	0.8	+0.1
Turnout		6,195	88.7	+2.9
Labor hold		Swing	+1.0	

=== Gregory ===
1926 Queensland state election: Gregory
Party	Candidate	Votes	%	±%
Labor	George Pollock	unopposed		
Labor hold		Swing		

=== Gympie ===
1926 Queensland state election: Gympie
Party	Candidate	Votes	%	±%
Labor	Thomas Dunstan	2,795	57.0	+0.9
CPNP	Henry Cowie	2,108	43.0	−0.9
Total formal votes		4,903	99.1	−0.3
Informal votes		44	0.9	+0.3
Turnout		4,947	93.2	+5.4
Labor hold		Swing	+0.9	

=== Herbert ===
1926 Queensland state election: Herbert
Party	Candidate	Votes	%	±%
Labor	Percy Pease	3,796	57.3	−9.2
CPNP	Norman Mighell	2,827	42.7	+9.2
Total formal votes		6,623	99.0	+0.1
Informal votes		69	1.0	−0.1
Turnout		6,692	84.0	+8.2
Labor hold		Swing	−9.2	

=== Ipswich ===
1926 Queensland state election: Ipswich
Party	Candidate	Votes	%	±%
Labor	David Gledson	3,702	56.2	+1.5
CPNP	Alfred Stephenson	2,880	43.8	−1.5
Total formal votes		6,582	98.8	−0.7
Informal votes		81	1.2	+0.7
Turnout		6,663	92.5	+1.8
Labor hold		Swing	+1.5	

=== Ithaca ===
1926 Queensland state election: Ithaca
Party	Candidate	Votes	%	±%
Labor	Ned Hanlon	4,201	58.8	+4.5
CPNP	William Robbins	2,747	38.4	−7.3
Independent Labor	Stanley Henderson	200	2.8	+2.8
Total formal votes		7,148	98.8	−0.3
Informal votes		87	1.2	+0.3
Turnout		7,235	91.9	+1.8
Labor hold		Swing	N/A	

=== Kelvin Grove ===
1926 Queensland state election: Kelvin Grove
Party	Candidate	Votes	%	±%
Labor	William Lloyd	3,882	54.3	−1.3
CPNP	Jack MacDonald	3,267	45.7	+1.3
Total formal votes		7,149	99.2	−0.3
Informal votes		57	0.8	+0.3
Turnout		7,206	84.8	+4.1
Labor hold		Swing	−1.3	

=== Kennedy ===
1926 Queensland state election: Kennedy
Party	Candidate	Votes	%	±%
Labor	Harry Bruce	3,122	50.2	−1.2
CPNP	William Green	2,694	43.3	−5.3
Primary Producers	John Young	405	6.5	+6.5
Total formal votes		6,221	98.8	+0.4
Informal votes		75	1.2	−0.4
Turnout		6,296	89.9	+4.9
Labor hold		Swing	N/A	

=== Keppel ===
1926 Queensland state election: Keppel
Party	Candidate	Votes	%	±%
Labor	James Larcombe	3,351	58.2	−2.5
CPNP	Ernest Larcombe	2,404	41.8	+2.5
Total formal votes		5,755	98.9	−0.1
Informal votes		65	1.1	+0.1
Turnout		5,820	92.2	+6.4
Labor hold		Swing	−2.5	

=== Kurilpa ===
1926 Queensland state election: Kurilpa
Party	Candidate	Votes	%	±%
CPNP	James Fry	3,536	55.3	0.0
Labor	Hamilton Jones	2,861	44.7	0.0
Total formal votes		6,397	99.1	0.0
Informal votes		59	0.9	0.0
Turnout		6,456	92.1	+3.5
CPNP hold		Swing	0.0	

=== Leichhardt ===
1926 Queensland state election: Leichhardt
Party	Candidate	Votes	%	±%
Labor	Tom Foley	2,565	61.4	+2.7
CPNP	Frederick Lodge	1,613	38.6	−2.7
Total formal votes		4,178	99.3	−0.1
Informal votes		30	0.7	+0.1
Turnout		4,208	83.3	+8.8
Labor hold		Swing	+2.7	

=== Lockyer ===
1926 Queensland state election: Lockyer
Party	Candidate	Votes	%	±%
CPNP	George Logan	2,335	43.9	+0.5
Primary Producers	Charles Jamieson	1,567	29.2	+29.2
Labor	Joseph Sweeney	1,442	26.9	−14.2
Total formal votes		5,364	99.3	+0.3
Informal votes		36	0.7	−0.3
Turnout		5,400	93.8	+2.6
Two-candidate-preferred result
CPNP	George Logan	2,470	57.6	+0.7
Primary Producers	Charles Jamieson	1,821	42.4	+42.4
CPNP hold		Swing	N/A	

=== Logan ===
1926 Queensland state election: Logan
Party	Candidate	Votes	%	±%
CPNP	Reginald King	4,970	53.6	+1.0
Labor	Dick Brown	4,304	46.4	−1.0
Total formal votes		9,274	99.2	+0.3
Informal votes		71	0.8	−0.3
Turnout		9,345	93.6	+5.4
CPNP hold		Swing	+1.0	

=== Mackay ===
1926 Queensland state election: Mackay
Party	Candidate	Votes	%	±%
Labor	William Forgan Smith	3,448	64.6	+6.7
CPNP	Hector O'Brien	1,888	35.4	−6.7
Total formal votes		5,336	99.0	−0.7
Informal votes		52	1.0	+0.7
Turnout		5,388	82.1	+2.4
Labor hold		Swing	+6.7	

=== Maranoa ===
1926 Queensland state election: Maranoa
Party	Candidate	Votes	%	±%
Labor	Charles Conroy	2,514	54.8	−2.7
CPNP	Arthur Miscamble	2,072	45.2	+45.2
Total formal votes		4,586	96.7	−3.0
Informal votes		158	3.3	+3.0
Turnout		4,744	89.6	+6.7
Labor hold		Swing	−2.7	

=== Maree ===
1926 Queensland state election: Maree
Party	Candidate	Votes	%	±%
Labor	William Bertram	3,467	50.5	−2.4
CPNP	George Tedman	3,395	49.5	+2.4
Total formal votes		6,862	99.0	−0.6
Informal votes		66	1.0	+0.6
Turnout		6,928	91.9	+3.0
Labor hold		Swing	−2.4	

=== Maryborough ===
1926 Queensland state election: Maryborough
Party	Candidate	Votes	%	±%
Labor	David Weir	3,628	59.3	−0.5
CPNP	Harry Keys	2,490	40.7	+0.5
Total formal votes		6,118	99.0	−0.1
Informal votes		62	1.0	+0.1
Turnout		6,180	93.6	+6.0
Labor hold		Swing	−0.5	

=== Merthyr ===
1926 Queensland state election: Merthyr
Party	Candidate	Votes	%	±%
Labor	Peter McLachlan	3,666	51.5	−0.9
CPNP	Edwin Fowles	3,448	48.5	+0.9
Total formal votes		7,114	99.2	−0.4
Informal votes		54	0.8	+0.4
Turnout		7,168	79.0	−0.5
Labor hold		Swing	−0.9	

=== Mirani ===
1926 Queensland state election: Mirani
Party	Candidate	Votes	%	±%
CPNP	Edward Swayne	2,936	52.2	+1.2
Labor	John Mulherin	2,690	47.8	−1.2
Total formal votes		5,626	99.0	−0.3
Informal votes		58	1.0	+0.3
Turnout		5,684	81.3	−1.6
CPNP hold		Swing	+1.2	

=== Mitchell ===
1926 Queensland state election: Mitchell
Party	Candidate	Votes	%	±%
Labor	John Payne	unopposed		
Labor hold		Swing		

==== By-election ====
- This by-election was caused by the death of John Payne. It was held on 26 May 1928.

1928 Mitchell state by-election
Party	Candidate	Votes	%	±%
Labor	Richard Bow	1,449	53.1	−46.9
CPNP	Thomas MacLeod	1,048	38.4	+38.4
Independent	John Durkin	233	8.5	+8.5
Total formal votes		2,730		
Informal votes				
Turnout				
Labor hold		Swing	N/A	

=== Mount Morgan ===
1926 Queensland state election: Mount Morgan
Party	Candidate	Votes	%	±%
Labor	James Stopford	2,581	66.3	−5.0
CPNP	Robert Staines	1,310	33.7	+5.0
Total formal votes		3,891	98.7	−0.5
Informal votes		51	1.3	+0.5
Turnout		3,942	86.2	+1.4
Labor hold		Swing	−5.0	

=== Mundingburra ===
1926 Queensland state election: Mundingburra
Party	Candidate	Votes	%	±%
Labor	John Dash	3,285	74.0	+9.5
CPNP	Miles Andrews	1,465	26.0	−9.5
Total formal votes		5,639	99.1	+0.1
Informal votes		53	0.9	−0.1
Turnout		5,692	91.3	+0.6
Labor hold		Swing	+9.5	

=== Murilla ===
1926 Queensland state election: Murilla
Party	Candidate	Votes	%	±%
CPNP	Godfrey Morgan	2,432	52.8	−2.5
Labor	Louis McCorkell	1,934	42.0	−2.7
Primary Producers	H.T. Kelly	241	5.2	+5.2
Total formal votes		4,607	98.6	−0.7
Informal votes		66	1.4	+0.7
Turnout		4,673	88.2	+10.7
CPNP hold		Swing	N/A	

=== Murrumba ===
1926 Queensland state election: Murrumba
Party	Candidate	Votes	%	±%
CPNP	Richard Warren	4,151	68.9	+17.7
Labor	William Friis	1,699	28.2	+1.8
Independent	Alfred O'Loan	175	2.9	+2.9
Total formal votes		6,025	97.8	−0.9
Informal votes		135	2.2	+0.9
Turnout		6,160	82.1	+4.6
CPNP hold		Swing	N/A	

=== Nanango ===
1926 Queensland state election: Nanango
Party	Candidate	Votes	%	±%
CPNP	Jim Edwards	3,606	60.3	+13.4
Labor	Robert Webster	2,066	34.6	−5.1
Primary Producers	William O'Mara	304	5.1	+5.1
Total formal votes		5,976	97.3	−1.3
Informal votes		167	2.7	+1.3
Turnout		6,143	90.5	+3.7
CPNP hold		Swing	N/A	

=== Normanby ===
1926 Queensland state election: Normanby
Party	Candidate	Votes	%	±%
CPNP	Jens Peterson	2,389	56.7	+3.6
Labor	Robert Lyle	1,826	43.3	−3.6
Total formal votes		4,215	98.9	−0.1
Informal votes		47	1.1	+0.1
Turnout		4,262	89.1	+6.7
CPNP hold		Swing	+3.6	

=== Nundah ===
1926 Queensland state election: Nundah
Party	Candidate	Votes	%	±%
CPNP	William Kelso	4,860	59.2	+2.5
Labor	Victor Kearney	3,353	40.8	−2.5
Total formal votes		8,213	99.1	+0.3
Informal votes		76	0.9	−0.3
Turnout		8,289	92.7	+4.9
CPNP hold		Swing	+2.5	

=== Oxley ===
1926 Queensland state election: Oxley
Party	Candidate	Votes	%	±%
CPNP	Cecil Elphinstone	5,479	60.4	−4.1
Labor	William Searle	3,592	39.6	+4.1
Total formal votes		9,071	99.2	0.0
Informal votes		74	0.8	0.0
Turnout		9,145	92.3	+5.4
CPNP hold		Swing	−4.1	

=== Paddington ===
1926 Queensland state election: Paddington
Party	Candidate	Votes	%	±%
Labor	Alfred Jones	4,130	73.1	+8.8
Independent	Grant Hervey	1,522	26.9	+26.9
Total formal votes		5,652	96.2	−3.3
Informal votes		226	3.8	+3.3
Turnout		5,878	77.4	−5.9
Labor hold		Swing	N/A	

=== Port Curtis ===
1926 Queensland state election: Port Curtis
Party	Candidate	Votes	%	±%
Labor	George Carter	2,849	45.6	−7.2
CPNP	Walter Prizeman	2,717	43.5	−0.4
Communist	Fred Paterson	676	10.8	+10.8
Total formal votes		6,242	98.9	−0.4
Informal votes		68	1.1	+0.4
Turnout		6,310	90.9	+0.1
Two-party-preferred result
Labor	George Carter	2,945	51.5	
CPNP	Walter Prizeman	2,769	48.5	
Labor hold		Swing	N/A	

=== Queenton ===
1926 Queensland state election: Queenton
Party	Candidate	Votes	%	±%
Labor	Vern Winstanley	2,069	55.9	+2.8
CPNP	John Jones	1,635	44.1	−2.8
Total formal votes		3,704	99.1	+0.6
Informal votes		34	0.9	−0.6
Turnout		3,738	86.2	+6.9
Labor hold		Swing	+2.8	

=== Rockhampton ===
1926 Queensland state election: Rockhampton
Party	Candidate	Votes	%	±%
Labor	George Farrell	3,088	67.7	+6.3
CPNP	James Cullen	1,473	32.3	−6.3
Total formal votes		4,561	97.8	−0.6
Informal votes		101	2.2	+0.6
Turnout		4,662	88.2	+11.9
Labor hold		Swing	+6.3	

=== Rosewood ===
1926 Queensland state election: Rosewood
Party	Candidate	Votes	%	±%
Labor	William Cooper	3,422	57.6	+3.5
CPNP	William Ruhno	2,518	42.4	−3.5
Total formal votes		5,940	98.2	−0.1
Informal votes		109	1.8	+0.1
Turnout		6,049	94.1	+6.2
Labor hold		Swing	+3.5	

=== Sandgate ===
1926 Queensland state election: Sandgate
Party	Candidate	Votes	%	±%
CPNP	Hubert Sizer	4,739	59.8	−3.2
Labor	James Weir	3,185	40.2	+40.2
Total formal votes		7,924	99.0	+4.8
Informal votes		79	1.0	−4.8
Turnout		8,003	90.5	+12.9
CPNP hold		Swing	N/A	

=== South Brisbane ===
1926 Queensland state election: South Brisbane
Party	Candidate	Votes	%	±%
Labor	Myles Ferricks	3,006	50.8	−2.3
CPNP	Alec McGill	2,907	49.2	+7.9
Total formal votes		5,888	99.1	+1.5
Informal votes		79	0.9	−1.5
Turnout		5,967	87.4	+2.9
Labor hold		Swing	N/A	

=== Stanley ===
1926 Queensland state election: Stanley
Party	Candidate	Votes	%	±%
CPNP	Frederick Nott	3,699	63.0	+12.8
Labor	James Gillies	2,171	37.0	+37.0
Total formal votes		5,870	99.0	+0.1
Informal votes		62	1.0	−0.1
Turnout		5,932	90.2	+8.0
CPNP hold		Swing	N/A	

==== By-election ====
- This by-election was caused by the death of Frederick Nott. It was held on 15 February 1928.

1928 Stanley state by-election
Party	Candidate	Votes	%	±%
CPNP	Ernest Grimstone	2,666	54.6	−8.4
Independent	Henry Somerset	2,096	43.0	+43.0
Independent	Alfred O'Loan	117	2.4	+2.4
Total formal votes		4,879		
Informal votes				
Turnout				
CPNP hold		Swing	N/A	

=== Toombul ===
1926 Queensland state election: Toombul
Party	Candidate	Votes	%	±%
CPNP	Hugh Russell	3,659	52.6	−14.7
Independent	Charles Jenkinson	3,303	47.4	+14.7
Total formal votes		6,962	96.7	+1.1
Informal votes		240	3.3	−1.1
Turnout		7,202	89.8	+6.0
CPNP hold		Swing	−14.7	

=== Toowong ===
1926 Queensland state election: Toowong
Party	Candidate	Votes	%	±%
CPNP	James Maxwell	4,588	68.0	−1.7
Labor	William Stock	2,583	32.0	+1.7
Total formal votes		8,071	99.4	0.0
Informal votes		51	0.6	0.0
Turnout		8,122	90.5	+3.2
CPNP hold		Swing	−1.7	

=== Toowoomba ===
1926 Queensland state election: Toowoomba
Party	Candidate	Votes	%	±%
Labor	Evan Llewelyn	3,816	56.7	+4.0
CPNP	Albert Godsall	2,911	43.3	−3.7
Total formal votes		6,727	98.5	−0.5
Informal votes		100	1.5	+0.5
Turnout		6,827	87.9	+12.2
Labor hold		Swing	N/A	

=== Townsville ===
1926 Queensland state election: Townsville
Party	Candidate	Votes	%	±%
Labor	Maurice Hynes	2,903	64.2	+12.2
CPNP	John Shearer	1,617	35.8	−12.2
Total formal votes		4,520	98.5	−0.6
Informal votes		67	1.5	+0.6
Turnout		4,587	86.9	+4.5
Labor hold		Swing	+12.2	

=== Warrego ===
1926 Queensland state election: Warrego
Party	Candidate	Votes	%	±%
Labor	Randolph Bedford	unopposed		
Labor hold		Swing		

=== Warwick ===
1926 Queensland state election: Warwick
Party	Candidate	Votes	%	±%
CPNP	George Barnes	3,261	54.6	+0.8
Labor	George James	2,708	45.4	−0.8
Total formal votes		5,969	99.1	−0.2
Informal votes		52	0.9	+0.2
Turnout		6,021	89.6	+3.3
CPNP hold		Swing	+0.8	

=== Wide Bay ===
1926 Queensland state election: Wide Bay
Party	Candidate	Votes	%	±%
CPNP	Harry Clayton	4,392	73.7	−26.3
Labor	Aaron Davies	1,567	26.3	+26.3
Total formal votes		5,959	97.5	
Informal votes		153	2.5	
Turnout		6,112	90.8	
CPNP hold		Swing	N/A	

=== Windsor ===
1926 Queensland state election: Windsor
Party	Candidate	Votes	%	±%
CPNP	Charles Taylor	4,468	58.3	+0.7
Labor	Donald MacKenzie	3,193	41.7	−0.7
Total formal votes		7,661	98.9	−0.4
Informal votes		85	1.1	+0.4
Turnout		7,746	91.8	+4.0
CPNP hold		Swing	+0.7	

=== Wynnum ===
1926 Queensland state election: Wynnum
Party	Candidate	Votes	%	±%
CPNP	Walter Barnes	4,458	61.6	+1.9
Labor	James McLaughlin	2,777	38.4	−1.9
Total formal votes		7,233	99.3	−0.1
Informal votes		50	0.7	+0.1
Turnout		7,283	91.0	+13.0
CPNP hold		Swing	+1.9	

== See also ==
- 1926 Queensland state election
- Candidates of the Queensland state election, 1926
- Members of the Queensland Legislative Assembly, 1926-1929
