= Candidates of the 1926 Queensland state election =

The 1926 Queensland state election was held on 8 May 1926.

Since the previous election, the United and Country parties have merged to form the Country and Progressive National Party. Seats held by either predecessor are listed as held by the CPNP.

== By-elections ==
- On 13 October 1923, Randolph Bedford (Labor) was elected to succeed Harry Coyne (Labor), who had resigned on 31 July 1923, as the member for Warrego.
- On 16 August 1924, Ted Hanson (Labor) was elected to succeed John Huxham (Labor), who had resigned on 31 July 1924, as the member for Buranda.
- On 4 April 1925, Evan Llewelyn (Labor) was elected to succeed Frank Brennan (Labor), who had resigned on 26 February 1925, as the member for Toowoomba.
- On 16 January 1926, John O'Keefe (Labor) was elected to succeed Ted Theodore (Labor), who had resigned on 22 September 1925, as the member for Chillagoe.
- On 16 January 1926, Cornelius Ryan (Labor) was elected to succeed William Gillies (Labor), who had resigned on 24 October 1925, as the member for Eacham.

== Retiring Members ==
=== Labor ===
- John Gilday MLA (Ithaca)

=== CPNP ===
- Andrew Petrie MLA (Toombul)

== Candidates ==
Sitting members at the time of the election are shown in bold text.

Electorate	Held by	Labor candidate	CPNP candidate	Other candidates
Albert	CPNP	William Lake	**John Appel**	Edwin Wilkins (Ind)
Aubigny	CPNP	John Moir	**Arthur Moore**	
Balonne	Labor	**Edward Land**	Ted Maher	
Barcoo	Labor	**Frank Bulcock**		
Bowen	Labor	**Charles Collins**	Frederick Woods	
Bremer	Labor	**Frank Cooper**	Kenneth McGill	
Brisbane	Labor	**Mick Kirwan**	Fred O'Keefe	
Bulimba	Labor	**Harry Wright**	Allan Stanton	John Costin (Ind Lab)
Bundaberg	Labor	**George Barber**	William Gavegan	
Buranda	Labor	**Ted Hanson**	Henry Quinn	
Burke	Labor	**Darby Riordan**		
Burnett	CPNP	Bill Baxter	**Bernard Corser**	
Burrum	CPNP	John Laurison	**William Brand**	
Cairns	Labor	**William McCormack**	Thomas Boylan	
Carnarvon	CPNP	Adolphus Baker	**Edward Costello**	
Charters Towers	Labor	**William Wellington**	William Clark	
Chillagoe	Labor	**John O'Keefe**	Bernard Hayes	
Cook	Labor	**Henry Ryan**	Thomas Kilpatrick	
Cooroora	CPNP		**Harry Walker**	
Cunningham	CPNP	Edward Doyle	**William Deacon**	
Dalby	CPNP	Harold Francis	**William Vowles**	Wilfred Russell (PPU)
Eacham	Labor	**Cornelius Ryan**	George Duffy	
East Toowoomba	CPNP	John Herbert	**Robert Roberts**	
Enoggera	CPNP	Hurtle Patterson	**Jim Kerr**	
Fassifern	CPNP		**Ernest Bell**	Tom Plunkett (Ind CP)
Fitzroy	Labor	**Harry Hartley**	Frank Dawson	
Flinders	Labor	**John Mullan**	Neville Sturzaker	
Fortitude Valley	Labor	**Thomas Wilson**	Percival Hooper	
Gregory	Labor	**George Pollock**		
Gympie	Labor	**Thomas Dunstan**	Henry Cowie	
Herbert	Labor	**Percy Pease**	Norman Mighell	
Ipswich	Labor	**David Gledson**	Alfred Stephenson	
Ithaca	Labor	Ned Hanlon	William Robbins	Stanley Henderson (Ind Lab)
Kelvin Grove	Labor	**William Lloyd**	Jack MacDonald	
Kennedy	Labor	**Harry Bruce**	William Green	John Young (PPU)
Keppel	Labor	**James Larcombe**	Ernest Larcombe	
Kurilpa	CPNP	Hamilton Jones	**James Fry**	
Leichhardt	Labor	**Tom Foley**	Frederick Lodge	
Lockyer	CPNP	Joseph Sweeney	**George Logan**	Charles Jamieson (PPU)
Logan	CPNP	Dick Brown	**Reginald King**	
Mackay	Labor	**William Forgan Smith**	Hector O'Brien	
Maranoa	Labor	**Charles Conroy**	Arthur Miscamble	
Maree	Labor	**William Bertram**	George Tedman	
Maryborough	Labor	**David Weir**	Harry Keys	
Merthyr	Labor	**Peter McLachlan**	Edwin Fowles	
Mirani	CPNP	John Mulherin	**Edward Swayne**	
Mitchell	Labor	**John Payne**		
Mount Morgan	Labor	**James Stopford**	Robert Staines	
Mundingburra	Labor	**John Dash**	Miles Andrews	
Murilla	CPNP	Louis McCorkell	**Godfrey Morgan**	H T Kelly (PPU)
Murrumba	CPNP	William Friis	**Richard Warren**	Alfred O'Loan (Ind)
Nanango	CPNP	Robert Webster	**Jim Edwards**	William O'Mara (PPU)
Normanby	CPNP	Robert Lyle	**Jens Peterson**	
Nundah	CPNP	Victor Kearney	**William Kelso**	
Oxley	CPNP	William Searle	**Cecil Elphinstone**	
Paddington	Labor	**Alfred Jones**		Grant Hervey (Ind)
Port Curtis	Labor	**George Carter**	Walter Prizeman	Fred Paterson (CPA)
Queenton	Labor	**Vern Winstanley**	John Jones	
Rockhampton	Labor	**George Farrell**	James Cullen	
Rosewood	Labor	**William Cooper**	William Ruhno	
Sandgate	CPNP	James Weir	**Hubert Sizer**	
South Brisbane	Labor	**Myles Ferricks**	Alec McGill	
Stanley	CPNP	James Gillies	**Frederick Nott**	
Toombul	CPNP		Hugh Russell	Charles Jenkinson (Ind)
Toowong	CPNP	William Stock	**James Maxwell**	
Toowoomba	Labor	**Evan Llewelyn**	Albert Godsall	
Townsville	Labor	**Maurice Hynes**	John Shearer	
Warrego	Labor	**Randolph Bedford**		
Warwick	CPNP	George James	**George Barnes**	
Wide Bay	CPNP	Aaron Davies	**Harry Clayton**	
Windsor	CPNP	Donald MacKenzie	**Charles Taylor**	
Wynnum	CPNP	James McLaughlin	**Walter Barnes**	

== See also ==
- 1926 Queensland state election
- Members of the Queensland Legislative Assembly, 1923–1926
- Members of the Queensland Legislative Assembly, 1926–1929
- List of political parties in Australia
