= Electoral results for the district of Maree =

Queensland, Australia, district election results

This is a list of electoral results for the electoral district of Maree in Queensland state elections.

== Members for Maree ==
Member	Party	Term
William Bertram	Labor	1912 – 1929
George Tedman	CPNP	1929 – 1932
William King	Labor	1932 – 1941
Louis Luckins	United Australia	1941 – 1944
Louis Luckins	Independent	1944 – 1947
Louis Luckins	Qld. People's	1947 – 1950

== Election results ==
=== Elections in the 1940s ===
1947 Queensland state election: Maree
Party	Candidate	Votes	%	±%
People's Party	Louis Luckins	5,326	50.6	+50.6
Labor	Leslie Brown	5,204	49.4	+2.7
Total formal votes		10,530	98.8	+0.3
Informal votes		124	1.2	−0.3
Turnout		10,654	92.5	+6.8
People's Party gain from Independent		Swing	N/A	

1944 Queensland state election: Maree
Party	Candidate	Votes	%	±%
Independent	Louis Luckins	5,294	53.3	+53.3
Labor	Jack McNulty	4,631	46.7	−3.1
Total formal votes		9,925	98.5	+2.0
Informal votes		152	1.5	−2.0
Turnout		10,077	85.7	−6.1
Independent gain from People's Party		Swing	N/A	

1941 Queensland state election: Maree
Party	Candidate	Votes	%	±%
United Australia	Louis Luckins	4,702	50.2	+11.0
Labor	William King	4,662	49.8	−3.5
Total formal votes		9,364	96.5	−2.2
Informal votes		338	3.5	+2.2
Turnout		9,702	91.8	−2.6
United Australia gain from Labor		Swing	+7.8	

=== Elections in the 1930s ===
1938 Queensland state election: Maree
Party	Candidate	Votes	%	±%
Labor	William King	5,201	53.3	−16.6
United Australia	William Carter	3,830	39.2	+9.1
Social Credit	Charles Martin	727	7.5	+7.5
Total formal votes		9,758	98.7	+1.4
Informal votes		128	1.3	−1.4
Turnout		9,886	94.4	+0.6
Labor hold		Swing	N/A	

- Preferences were not distributed.

1935 Queensland state election: Maree
Party	Candidate	Votes	%	±%
Labor	William King	6,400	69.9	
CPNP	David Miller	2,763	30.1	
Total formal votes		9,163	97.3	
Informal votes		253	2.7	
Turnout		9,416	93.8	
Labor hold		Swing		

1932 Queensland state election: Maree
Party	Candidate	Votes	%	±%
Labor	William King	5,025	54.6	
CPNP	Louis Luckins	3,891	42.2	
Queensland Party	John Perry	163	1.8	
Social Credit	Hugh Phair	133	1.4	
Total formal votes		9,212	99.1	
Informal votes		82	0.9	
Turnout		9,294	93.2	
Labor gain from CPNP		Swing		

- Preferences were not distributed.

=== Elections in the 1920s ===
1929 Queensland state election: Maree
Party	Candidate	Votes	%	±%
CPNP	George Tedman	4,034	57.0	+7.5
Labor	William Bertram	3,042	43.0	−7.5
Total formal votes		7,076	98.6	−0.4
Informal votes		97	1.4	+0.4
Turnout		7,173	91.3	−0.6
CPNP gain from Labor		Swing	+7.5	

1926 Queensland state election: Maree
Party	Candidate	Votes	%	±%
Labor	William Bertram	3,467	50.5	−2.4
CPNP	George Tedman	3,395	49.5	+2.4
Total formal votes		6,862	99.0	−0.6
Informal votes		66	1.0	+0.6
Turnout		6,928	91.9	+3.0
Labor hold		Swing	−2.4	

1923 Queensland state election: Maree
Party	Candidate	Votes	%	±%
Labor	William Bertram	3,450	52.9	+1.7
United	John Hetherington	3,073	47.1	−1.7
Total formal votes		6,523	99.6	−0.2
Informal votes		29	0.4	+0.2
Turnout		6,552	88.9	+4.5
Labor hold		Swing	+1.7	

1920 Queensland state election: Maree
Party	Candidate	Votes	%	±%
Labor	William Bertram	3,164	51.2	−1.9
National	Field Evans Smith	3,015	48.8	+2.9
Total formal votes		6,179	99.8	+0.8
Informal votes		13	0.2	−0.8
Turnout		6,192	84.4	+0.2
Labor hold		Swing	−2.4	

=== Elections in the 1910s ===
1918 Queensland state election: Maree
Party	Candidate	Votes	%	±%
Labor	William Bertram	2,981	53.1	−7.1
National	Pearce Douglas	2,577	45.9	+6.1
Independent	Victor Cross	56	1.0	+1.0
Total formal votes		5,614	99.0	+0.4
Informal votes		54	1.0	−0.4
Turnout		5,668	84.2	−8.6
Labor hold		Swing	N/A	

- Preferences were not distributed.

1915 Queensland state election: Maree
Party	Candidate	Votes	%	±%
Labor	William Bertram	2,936	60.2	+9.0
Liberal	John Walsh	1,942	39.8	−9.0
Total formal votes		4,878	98.6	−0.1
Informal votes		70	1.4	+0.1
Turnout		4,948	92.8	+8.6
Labor hold		Swing	+9.0	

1912 Queensland state election: Maree
Party	Candidate	Votes	%	±%
Labor	William Bertram	2,096	51.2	
Liberal	David Hunter	2,000	48.8	
Total formal votes		4,096	98.7	
Informal votes		53	1.3	
Turnout		4,149	84.2	
Labor gain from Liberal		Swing		
