= Electoral results for the district of Buranda =

Queensland, Australia, district election results

This is a list of electoral results for the electoral district of Buranda in Queensland state elections.

== Members for Buranda ==
The following people were elected in the seat of Buranda:

Member	Party	Term detail
John Huxham	Labor	1912–1924
Ted Hanson	Labor	1924–1947
Dick Brown	Labor	1947–1957
Keith Hooper	Liberal	1957–1960

== Election results ==
=== Elections in the 1950s ===
1957 Queensland state election: Buranda
Party	Candidate	Votes	%	±%
Liberal	Keith Hooper	3,472	37.5	−7.0
Labor	Dick Brown	3,188	34.4	−21.1
Queensland Labor	Michael Lyons	2,113	22.8	+22.8
Independent	John Handasyde	484	5.2	+5.2
Total formal votes		9,257	99.2	+0.1
Informal votes		72	0.8	−0.1
Turnout		9,329	95.6	+1.5
Liberal gain from Labor		Swing	+7.6	

1956 Queensland state election: Buranda
Party	Candidate	Votes	%	±%
Labor	Dick Brown	5,129	55.5	−8.0
Liberal	Keith Hooper	4,118	44.5	+8.0
Total formal votes		9,247	99.1	+0.2
Informal votes		86	0.9	−0.2
Turnout		9,333	94.1	−0.2
Labor hold		Swing	−8.0	

1953 Queensland state election: Buranda
Party	Candidate	Votes	%	±%
Labor	Dick Brown	6,117	63.5	+10.5
Liberal	Cecil Holt	3,523	36.5	−10.5
Total formal votes		9,640	98.9	−0.2
Informal votes		110	1.1	+0.2
Turnout		9,750	94.3	−0.1
Labor hold		Swing	+10.5	

1950 Queensland state election: Buranda
Party	Candidate	Votes	%	±%
Labor	Dick Brown	5,439	53.0	
Liberal	Percy Berry	4,826	47.0	
Total formal votes		10,265	98.9	
Informal votes		114	1.1	
Turnout		10,379	94.4	
Labor hold		Swing		

=== Elections in the 1940s ===
1947 Queensland state election: Buranda
Party	Candidate	Votes	%	±%
Labor	Dick Brown	6,210	52.9	+2.2
People's Party	William Scott	5,525	47.1	−2.2
Total formal votes		11,735	98.9	0.0
Informal votes		127	1.1	0.0
Turnout		11,862	92.5	+3.6
Labor hold		Swing	+2.2	

1944 Queensland state election: Buranda
Party	Candidate	Votes	%	±%
Labor	Edward Hanson	5,569	50.7	−6.2
People's Party	Robert Roberts	5,417	49.3	+6.2
Total formal votes		10,986	98.9	+1.0
Informal votes		125	1.1	−1.0
Turnout		11,111	88.9	−2.6
Labor hold		Swing	−6.2	

1941 Queensland state election: Buranda
Party	Candidate	Votes	%	±%
Labor	Edward Hanson	5,745	56.9	+6.0
United Australia	Hector Annat	4,345	43.1	+19.2
Total formal votes		10,090	97.9	−0.6
Informal votes		216	2.1	+0.6
Turnout		10,306	91.5	−2.6
Labor hold		Swing	−11.1	

=== Elections in the 1930s ===
1938 Queensland state election: Buranda
Party	Candidate	Votes	%	±%
Labor	Edward Hanson	5,168	50.9	−13.3
United Australia	Hector Annat	2,432	23.9	−3.0
Protestant Labour	Joseph Webster	2,202	21.7	+21.7
Social Credit	Harold Tapper	358	3.5	−5.5
Total formal votes		10,160	98.5	−0.2
Informal votes		155	1.5	+0.2
Turnout		10,315	94.1	+0.8
Labor hold		Swing	N/A	

1935 Queensland state election: Buranda
Party	Candidate	Votes	%	±%
Labor	Edward Hanson	6,139	64.2	
CPNP	Charles Edwards	2,570	26.9	
Social Credit	John Read	860	9.0	
Total formal votes		9,569	98.7	
Informal votes		126	1.3	
Turnout		9,695	93.3	
Labor hold		Swing		

1932 Queensland state election: Buranda
Party	Candidate	Votes	%	±%
Labor	Edward Hanson	5,722	66.0	
CPNP	Thomas Kerr	2,947	34.0	
Total formal votes		8,669	98.8	
Informal votes		106	1.2	
Turnout		8,775	86.1	
Labor hold		Swing		

=== Elections in the 1920s ===
1929 Queensland state election: Buranda
Party	Candidate	Votes	%	±%
Labor	Ted Hanson	3,425	51.3	−9.0
CPNP	Henry Quinn	3,252	48.7	+9.0
Total formal votes		6,677	98.5	−0.7
Informal votes		102	1.5	+0.7
Turnout		6,779	83.3	−9.0
Labor hold		Swing	−9.0	

1926 Queensland state election: Buranda
Party	Candidate	Votes	%	±%
Labor	Edward Hanson	3,971	60.3	+3.7
CPNP	Henry Quinn	2,619	39.7	−3.7
Total formal votes		6,590	99.3	−0.1
Informal votes		48	0.7	+0.1
Turnout		6,638	92.3	+2.9
Labor hold		Swing	+3.7	

1924 Buranda state by-election
Party	Candidate	Votes	%	±%
Labor	Edward Hanson	3,379	56.6	0.0
United	James Davey	2,578	43.4	0.0
Total formal votes		5,999	99.3	−0.1
Informal votes		45	0.7	+0.1
Turnout		6,044		
Labor hold		Swing	0.0	

1923 Queensland state election: Buranda
Party	Candidate	Votes	%	±%
Labor	John Huxham	3,662	56.6	+0.7
United	Charles Edwards	2,806	43.4	−0.7
Total formal votes		6,468	99.4	+0.1
Informal votes		42	0.6	−0.1
Turnout		6,510	89.4	+4.5
Labor hold		Swing	+0.7	

1920 Queensland state election: Buranda
Party	Candidate	Votes	%	±%
Labor	John Huxham	3,503	55.9	−4.9
National	Alfred Faulkner	2,768	44.1	+4.9
Total formal votes		6,271	99.3	0.0
Informal votes		46	0.7	0.0
Turnout		6,317	84.9	−0.5
Labor hold		Swing	−4.9	

=== Elections in the 1910s ===
1918 Queensland state election: Buranda
Party	Candidate	Votes	%	±%
Labor	John Huxham	3,588	60.8	−4.4
National	William Sparkes	2,309	39.2	+4.4
Total formal votes		5,897	99.3	+1.4
Informal votes		42	0.7	−1.4
Turnout		5,939	85.4	−6.8
Labor hold		Swing	−4.4	

1915 Queensland state election: Buranda
Party	Candidate	Votes	%	±%
Labor	John Huxham	3,177	65.2	+9.7
Liberal	Joseph Allen	1,697	34.8	−9.7
Total formal votes		4,874	97.9	−1.4
Informal votes		104	2.1	+1.4
Turnout		4,978	92.2	+4.7
Labor hold		Swing	+9.7	

1912 Queensland state election: Buranda
Party	Candidate	Votes	%	±%
Labor	John Huxham	2,276	55.5	
Liberal	William Stephens	1,824	44.5	
Total formal votes		4,100	99.3	
Informal votes		27	0.7	
Turnout		4,127	87.5	
Labor gain from Liberal		Swing		
