= Electoral results for the district of Eacham =

Queensland, Australia, district election results

This is a list of electoral results for the electoral district of Eacham in Queensland state elections.

== Members for Eacham ==
The members for Eacham were:

Member	Party	Term
William Gillies	Labor	Apr 1912 – Oct 1925
Cornelius Ryan	Labor	Jan 1926 – May 1929
George Duffy	CPNP	May 1929 – Mar 1932

== Election results ==
=== Elections in the 1920s ===
1929 Queensland state election: Eacham
Party	Candidate	Votes	%	±%
CPNP	George Duffy	3,145	60.2	+11.7
Labor	Cornelius Ryan	2,075	39.8	−11.7
Total formal votes		5,220		
Informal votes				
Turnout				
CPNP gain from Labor		Swing	+11.7	

1926 Queensland state election: Eacham
Party	Candidate	Votes	%	±%
Labor	Cornelius Ryan	2,965	51.5	−48.5
CPNP	George Duffy	2,794	48.5	+48.5
Total formal votes		5,759	97.6	
Informal votes		141	2.4	
Turnout		5,900	85.0	
Labor hold		Swing	N/A	

1926 Eacham state by-election
Party	Candidate	Votes	%	±%
Labor	Cornelius Ryan	2,433	51.1	−48.9
CPNP	Edward Heale	2,327	48.9	+48.9
Total formal votes		4,760	99.2	
Informal votes		40	0.8	
Turnout		4,800		
Labor hold		Swing	N/A	

1923 Queensland state election: Eacham
Party	Candidate	Votes	%	±%
Labor	William Gillies	unopposed		
Labor hold		Swing		

1920 Queensland state election: Eacham
Party	Candidate	Votes	%	±%
Labor	William Gillies	2,581	55.3	+0.5
Independent Country	James McCarthy	2,085	44.7	+44.7
Total formal votes		4,666	99.2	+0.5
Informal votes		39	0.8	−0.5
Turnout		4,705	82.3	+2.1
Labor hold		Swing	+0.5	

=== Elections in the 1910s ===
1918 Queensland state election: Eacham
Party	Candidate	Votes	%	±%
Labor	William Gillies	2,041	54.8	−11.7
National	William Sloan	1,682	45.2	+11.7
Total formal votes		3,723	98.7	+1.5
Informal votes		47	1.3	−1.5
Turnout		3,770	80.2	−6.8
Labor hold		Swing	−11.7	

1915 Queensland state election: Eacham
Party	Candidate	Votes	%	±%
Labor	William Gillies	2,095	66.5	+14.1
Liberal	Edward Heales	1,054	33.5	−14.1
Total formal votes		3,149	97.2	−1.2
Informal votes		91	2.8	+1.2
Turnout		3,240	87.0	+10.1
Labor hold		Swing	+14.1	

1912 Queensland state election: Eacham
Party	Candidate	Votes	%	±%
Labor	William Gillies	1,254	52.4	
Liberal	Michael Woods	1,141	47.6	
Total formal votes		2,395	98.4	
Informal votes		38	1.6	
Turnout		2,433	76.9	
Labor gain from Liberal		Swing		
