= Members of the Queensland Legislative Assembly, 1926–1929 =

This is a list of members of the 24th Legislative Assembly of Queensland from 1926 to 1929, as elected at the 1926 state election held on 8 May 1926.

Name	Party	Electorate	Term in office
John Appel^{[5]}	CPNP	Albert	1908–1929
George Barber	Labor	Bundaberg	1901–1935
George Barnes	CPNP	Warwick	1908–1935
Walter Barnes	CPNP	Wynnum	1901–1915, 1918–1933
Randolph Bedford	Labor	Warrego	1923–1941
Ernest Bell	CPNP	Fassifern	1913–1930
Hon William Bertram	Labor	Maree	1912–1929
Richard Bow^{[3]}	Labor	Mitchell	1928–1932
Robert Boyd^{[4]}	CPNP	Burnett	1928–1932
William Brand	CPNP	Burrum	1920–1950
Samuel Brassington^{[1]}	Labor	Balonne	1927–1932, 1933–1950
Harry Bruce	Labor	Kennedy	1923–1950
Frank Bulcock	Labor	Barcoo	1919–1942
George Carter	Labor	Port Curtis	1915–1920, 1923–1929
Harry Clayton	CPNP	Wide Bay	1920–1946
Charles Collins	Labor	Bowen	1909–1912, 1915–1936
Charles Conroy	Labor	Maranoa	1920–1944
Frank Cooper	Labor	Bremer	1915–1946
William Cooper	Labor	Rosewood	1918–1929
Bernard Corser^{[4]}	CPNP	Burnett	1912–1928
Edward Costello	CPNP	Carnarvon	1920–1935
John Dash	Labor	Mundingburra	1920–1944
William Deacon	CPNP	Cunningham	1920–1943
Hon Thomas Dunstan	Labor	Gympie	1915–1929, 1935–1953
Jim Edwards	CPNP	Nanango	1920–1947
Cecil Elphinstone	CPNP	Oxley	1918–1929
George Farrell	Labor	Rockhampton	1923–1929
Myles Ferricks	Labor	South Brisbane	1909–1912, 1920–1929
Tom Foley	Labor	Leichhardt	1919–1960
James Fry	CPNP	Kurilpa	1918–1932
Hon David Gledson	Labor	Ipswich	1915–1929, 1932–1949
Ernest Grimstone^{[2]}	CPNP	Stanley	1928–1933
Ned Hanlon	Labor	Ithaca	1926–1952
Ted Hanson	Labor	Buranda	1924–1947
Harry Hartley	Labor	Fitzroy	1915–1929
Maurice Hynes	Labor	Townsville	1923–1939
Hon Alfred Jones	Labor	Paddington	1904–1909, 1915–1917, 1922–1932
William Kelso	CPNP	Nundah	1923–1932
Jim Kerr	CPNP	Enoggera	1920–1932
Reginald King	CPNP	Logan	1920–1935
Mick Kirwan	Labor	Brisbane	1912–1932
Edward Land^{[1]}	Labor	Balonne	1904–1927
James Larcombe	Labor	Keppel	1912–1929, 1932–1956
Evan Llewelyn	Labor	Toowoomba	1925–1929, 1932–1935
William Lloyd	Labor	Kelvin Grove	1915–1920, 1923–1929
George Logan	CPNP	Lockyer	1920–1929
Hon William McCormack	Labor	Cairns	1912–1930
Peter McLachlan	Labor	Merthyr	1908–1912, 1915–1920, 1923–1929
James Maxwell	CPNP	Toowong	1920–1938
Arthur Moore	CPNP	Aubigny	1915–1941
Godfrey Morgan	CPNP	Murilla	1909–1938
Hon John Mullan	Labor	Flinders	1908–1912, 1918–1941
Frederick Nott^{[2]}	CPNP	Stanley	1920–1927
John O'Keefe	Labor	Chillagoe	1926–1929, 1930–1942
John Payne^{[3]}	Labor	Mitchell	1905–1928
Percy Pease	Labor	Herbert	1920–1940
Jens Peterson	CPNP	Normanby	1915–1935
George Pollock	Labor	Gregory	1915–1939
Darby Riordan	Labor	Burke	1918–1929
Robert Roberts	CPNP	East Toowoomba	1907–1934
Hugh Russell	CPNP	Toombul	1926–1941
Wilfred Russell	PPC/CPNP	Dalby	1926–1932
Cornelius Ryan	Labor	Eacham	1926–1929
Henry Ryan	Labor	Cook	1915–1929
Hubert Sizer	CPNP	Sandgate	1918–1935
Hon William Forgan Smith	Labor	Mackay	1915–1942
Hon James Stopford	Labor	Mount Morgan	1915–1936
Edward Swayne	CPNP	Mirani	1907–1935
Charles Taylor	CPNP	Windsor	1918–1935
Harry Walker	CPNP	Cooroora	1907–1947
Richard Warren	CPNP	Murrumba	1918–1932
David Weir	Labor	Maryborough	1917–1929
William Wellington	Labor	Charters Towers	1915–1939
Hon Thomas Wilson	Labor	Fortitude Valley	1916–1933
Vern Winstanley	Labor	Queenton	1908–1932
Harry Wright	Labor	Bulimba	1923–1929

^{1} On 2 May 1927, the Labor member for Balonne, Edward Land, died. Labor candidate Samuel Brassington won the resulting by-election on 6 August 1927.
^{2} On 5 December 1927, the CPNP member for Stanley, Frederick Lancelot Nott, died. CPNP candidate Ernest Grimstone won the resulting by-election on 25 February 1928.
^{3} On 24 January 1928, the Labor member for Mitchell, John Payne, died. Labor candidate Richard Bow won the resulting by-election on 26 May 1928.
^{4} On 16 August 1928, the CPNP member for Burnett, Bernard Corser, resigned to run for the federal seat of Wide Bay. CPNP candidate Robert Boyd won the resulting by-election on 13 October 1928.
^{5} On 19 March 1929, the CPNP member for Albert, John Appel, died. The vacancy was not filled due to the imminent 1929 state election.

== See also ==
- 1926 Queensland state election
- McCormack Ministry (Labor) (1925–1929)
