= Electoral results for the district of Chillagoe =

Queensland, Australia, district election results

This is a list of electoral results for the electoral district of Chillagoe in Queensland state elections.

== Members for Chillagoe ==
Member	Party	Term
Ted Theodore	Labor	1912 – 1925
John O'Keefe	Labor	1926 – 1929
Ernest Atherton	CPNP	1929 – 1932

== Election results ==
=== Elections in the 1920s ===
1929 Queensland state election: Chillagoe
Party	Candidate	Votes	%	±%
CPNP	Ernest Atherton	1,844	52.9	+20.4
Labor	John O'Keefe	1,639	47.1	−20.4
Total formal votes		3,483	98.4	−0.4
Informal votes		56	1.6	+0.4
Turnout		3,539	77.3	+1.8
CPNP gain from Labor		Swing	+20.4	

1926 Queensland state election: Chillagoe
Party	Candidate	Votes	%	±%
Labor	John O'Keefe	2,537	67.5	+3.2
CPNP	Bernard Hayes	1,222	32.5	+4.2
Total formal votes		3,759	98.8	+1.0
Informal votes		47	1.2	−1.0
Turnout		3,806	79.1	−1.9
Labor hold		Swing	N/A	

1926 Chillagoe state by-election
Party	Candidate	Votes	%	±%
Labor	John O'Keefe	2,023	61.7	−2.3
CPNP	W. Leale	1,256	38.3	+2.3
Total formal votes		3,279		
Informal votes				
Turnout				
Labor hold		Swing	−2.3	

1923 Queensland state election: Chillagoe
Party	Candidate	Votes	%	±%
Labor	Ted Theodore	2,459	64.3	−13.5
United	Ernest Atherton	1,083	28.3	+6.1
Independent	Thomas Taylor	283	7.4	+7.4
Total formal votes		3,825	97.8	+0.1
Informal votes		84	2.2	−0.1
Turnout		3,909	81.0	−0.3
Labor hold		Swing	N/A	

1920 Queensland state election: Chillagoe
Party	Candidate	Votes	%	±%
Labor	Ted Theodore	1,384	77.8	+5.0
Northern Country	John Egerton	394	22.2	+22.2
Total formal votes		1,778	97.7	−1.0
Informal votes		41	2.3	+1.0
Turnout		1,819	81.3	+2.8
Labor hold		Swing	+5.0	

=== Elections in the 1910s ===
1918 Queensland state election: Chillagoe
Party	Candidate	Votes	%	±%
Labor	Ted Theodore	1,018	72.8	−6.9
National	William Worley	380	27.2	+6.9
Total formal votes		1,398	98.7	+1.6
Informal votes		19	1.3	−1.6
Turnout		1,417	78.5	−1.1
Labor hold		Swing	−6.9	

1915 Queensland state election: Chillagoe
Party	Candidate	Votes	%	±%
Labor	Ted Theodore	1,288	79.7	+4.6
Liberal	Edward Steele	328	20.3	−4.6
Total formal votes		1,616	97.1	−0.3
Informal votes		49	2.9	+0.3
Turnout		1,665	79.6	+9.7
Labor hold		Swing	+4.6	

1912 Queensland state election: Chillagoe
Party	Candidate	Votes	%	±%
Labor	Ted Theodore	1,774	75.1	
Liberal	Archibald Frew	588	24.9	
Total formal votes		2,362	97.4	
Informal votes		64	2.6	
Turnout		2,426	69.9	
Labor hold		Swing		
