= Electoral results for the district of Norman =

Queensland, Australia, district election results

This is a list of electoral results for the electoral district of Norman in Queensland state elections.

== Members for Norman ==
Member	Party	Term	Notes
Louis Luckins	Liberal	1950–1953	Luckins previously represented Maree (1944–1950). He retired at the 1960 state election.
William Baxter	Labor	1953–1960	Baxter subsequently represented Hawthorne (1960–1966)
Fred Bromley	Labor	1960–1972	Bromley subsequently represented South Brisbane (1972–1974)

== Election results ==
=== Elections in the 1960s ===
1969 Queensland state election: Norman
Party	Candidate	Votes	%	±%
Labor	Fred Bromley	4,483	53.4	−3.2
Liberal	Ross Cameron	3,340	39.8	+5.4
Queensland Labor	Maurice Sheehan	577	6.9	−0.9
Total formal votes		8,400	97.5	−0.3
Informal votes		219	2.5	+0.3
Turnout		8,619	89.4	−2.9
Two-party-preferred result
Labor	Fred Bromley	4,590	54.6	−4.1
Liberal	Ross Cameron	3,810	45.4	+4.1
Labor hold		Swing	−4.1	

1966 Queensland state election: Norman
Party	Candidate	Votes	%	±%
Labor	Fred Bromley	5,080	56.6	+3.4
Liberal	Sydney Shawcross	3,087	34.4	−0.4
Queensland Labor	John Fitz-Gibbon	700	7.8	−2.1
Social Credit	David Gray	107	1.2	−1.8
Total formal votes		8,974	97.8	+0.5
Informal votes		200	2.2	−0.5
Turnout		9,174	92.3	−1.5
Two-party-preferred result
Labor	Fred Bromley	5,264	58.7	+2.2
Liberal	Sydney Shawcross	3,710	41.3	−2.2
Labor hold		Swing	+2.2	

1963 Queensland state election: Norman
Party	Candidate	Votes	%	±%
Labor	Fred Bromley	4,928	53.2	+5.0
Liberal	Cyril Ryan	3,150	34.0	−2.1
Queensland Labor	Harry Wright	918	9.9	−4.7
Social Credit	David Gray	275	3.0	+3.0
Total formal votes		9,271	97.3	−1.5
Informal votes		254	2.7	+1.5
Turnout		9,525	93.8	+1.7
Two-party-preferred result
Labor	Fred Bromley	5,237	56.5	
Liberal	Cyril Ryan	4,034	43.5	
Labor hold		Swing	N/A	

1960 Queensland state election: Norman
Party	Candidate	Votes	%	±%
Labor	Fred Bromley	4,896	48.1	
Liberal	Cyril Ryan	3,679	36.1	
Queensland Labor	George Hartnett	1,489	14.6	
Communist	Edmund Crisp	115	1.1	
Total formal votes		10,179	98.8	
Informal votes		121	1.2	
Turnout		10,300	92.1	
Labor hold		Swing		

=== Elections in the 1950s ===
1957 Queensland state election: Norman
Party	Candidate	Votes	%	±%
Labor	Bill Baxter	4,478	41.1	−15.0
Liberal	George Regan	4,376	40.2	−3.7
Queensland Labor	Norman Tacey	2,033	18.7	+18.7
Total formal votes		10,887	98.7	−0.2
Informal votes		148	1.3	+0.2
Turnout		11,035	95.6	+1.1
Labor hold		Swing	−5.5	

1956 Queensland state election: Norman
Party	Candidate	Votes	%	±%
Labor	Bill Baxter	6,052	56.1	−3.1
Liberal	George Regan	4,738	43.9	+3.1
Total formal votes		10,790	98.9	0.0
Informal votes		120	1.1	0.0
Turnout		10,910	94.5	+0.6
Labor hold		Swing	−3.1	

1953 Queensland state election: Norman
Party	Candidate	Votes	%	±%
Labor	Bill Baxter	6,447	59.2	+10.4
Liberal	Rex Brock	4,446	40.8	−10.4
Total formal votes		10,893	98.9	0.0
Informal votes		116	1.1	0.0
Turnout		11,009	93.9	+0.6
Labor gain from Liberal		Swing	+10.4	

1950 Queensland state election: Norman
Party	Candidate	Votes	%	±%
Liberal	Louis Luckins	5,593	51.2	
Labor	Edward Falk	5,339	48.8	
Total formal votes		10,932	98.9	
Informal votes		121	1.1	
Turnout		11,053	93.3	
Liberal hold		Swing		
