= Cornelius Ryan (disambiguation) =

Cornelius Ryan (1920–1974) was an Irish journalist and author known for his books on World War II.

Cornelius Ryan may also refer to:

- Cornelius Ryan (politician) (1882–1939), Australian politician
- Cornelius E. Ryan (1896-1972), U.S. Army general
