= John Archibald (politician) =

Australian politician

The Hon John Archibald
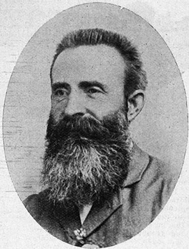

Member of the Queensland Legislative Council
- In office 11 March 1897 – 20 May 1907

Personal details
- Born: John Archibald; 15 December 1845 Tranent, Haddington, Scotland
- Died: 20 May 1907 (aged 61) New Farm, Queensland, Australia
- Resting place: Toowong Cemetery
- Spouse: Frances Amelia Herbert (m.1872 d.1944)
- Occupation: Teacher, Police magistrate, Flour mill operator

John Archibald (15 December 1845 – 20 May 1907) was a politician in Queensland, Australia. He was a Member of the Queensland Legislative Council.

== Politics ==
Archibald served as a councillor on the Warwick Town Council and was mayor in 1890 and 1897.

John Archibald was appointed to the Queensland Legislative Council on 11 March 1897. A lifetime appointment, it ended with his death on 20 May 1907. Archibald was buried in Toowong Cemetery.

== Personal life ==
In 1904, John Archibald's daughter, Janet Mary Archibald married Edwin Fowles (also a Member of the Queensland Legislative Council).
