= John Atherton (pioneer) =

English-born explorer and pastoralist in Queensland, Australia

John Atherton (9 August 1837 – 16 May 1913) was an English-born overlander, grazier, and explorer whose pastoral and transport enterprises contributed to the European settlement of Far North Queensland. He established Emerald End station on the Barron River, supplied cattle to northern goldfields, assisted in opening overland routes, and played a prominent role in the development of Mareeba and the Atherton Tableland, both of which bear his name.

== Early life ==
Atherton was born in Lancashire, England, the son of Edmund Atherton and Esther Ainscough. In 1844 he migrated with his family to Sydney, later growing up near Armidale, New South Wales, where he gained experience in farming and grazing.

== Queensland career ==
In the late 1850s Atherton drove sheep to the Rockhampton district before establishing pastoral properties in central Queensland. Following his marriage to Catherine Grainger in 1862, he continued acquiring grazing runs and exploring new stock routes, including roads linking the coast with inland settlements.

Demand from the Palmer River Goldfield and Hodgkinson Goldfield led him to overland cattle into Far North Queensland during the 1870s. After briefly occupying Basalt Downs, he settled permanently at Emerald End on the Barron River, from where he explored the surrounding tablelands, shortened the route between Atherton, Queensland and Herberton, Queensland, and discovered tin near what became Tinaroo Creek. His discoveries contributed to the establishment of Herberton, while his settlement activities were central to the development of Mareeba.

Atherton built one of the district's earliest substantial homesteads, experimented with agriculture and horse breeding, and remained involved in disputes over pastoral tenure before securing recognition of his land claims.

== Later life ==
Atherton continued managing his pastoral interests while supporting local agricultural and racing organisations. He died at Emerald End on 16 May 1913 and was buried in the family cemetery on the property.

Atherton is regarded as the founder of Mareeba, while the town of Atherton, Queensland and the Atherton Tableland commemorate his name. His papers, including correspondence, journals and photographs relating to early settlement in Far North Queensland, are preserved by the State Library of Queensland.

== Legacy ==
His family papers collection have been preserved by the State Library of Queensland. The collection consists of a journal dated 1884, correspondence, postcards, photographs, maps, sketches, invitations, share certificates, poems, etc... also correspondence from his sister Alice and other members of his family. There are a total of 107 letters, ranging from 1877 to 1896, mainly between members of the Atherton family. They describe life and conditions on Emerald End Station. There is also some of his correspondence with Robert Philip, J. Byrnes and various officials of the Queensland Government regarding land in the Mareeba District.

== Family ==
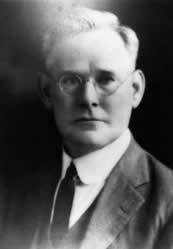
Ernest Atherton

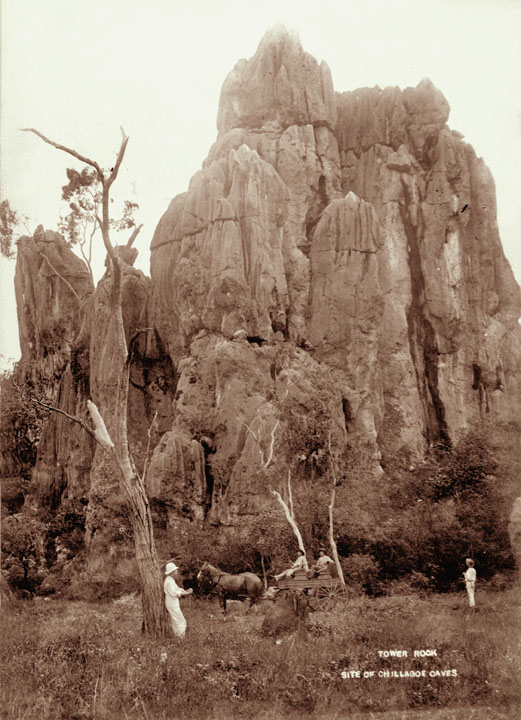
Chillagoe Caves in 1897

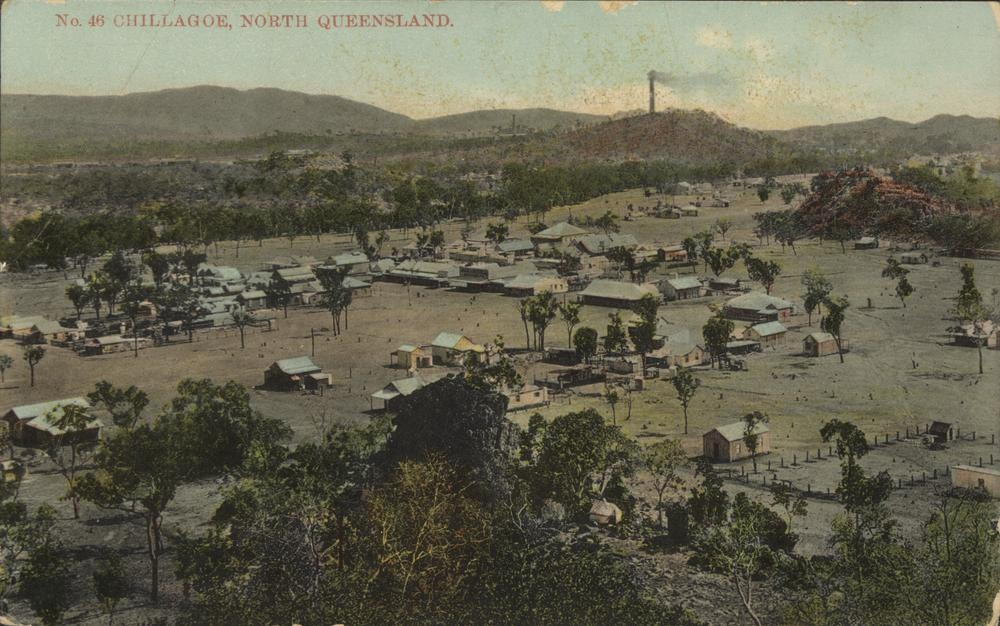
Chillagoe in 1905

Children of John and Catherine Atherton:

- Edmund Henry Atherton (1863–1919)
- William Atherton (1865–1940) took up Chillagoe, Queensland, near by on the tributaries of the Mitchell River. The discovery of copper resulted in the growth of the Chillagoe township.
- Lucy Julia Atherton (1867-unknown), who wrote his biography which was published in 1969
- Esther Annie Atherton (1869–1962)
- Ada Mary Atherton (1871–unknown)
- Kate Maud Atherton (1873–1951)
- John Grainger Atherton (1875-unknown)
- Mabel Alice Atherton (1877–1880)
- Ernest Albert Atherton (1879–1954), was elected to the Queensland parliament in 1929 as member for Chillagoe, and was Secretary for Mines from 1929 to 1932.

== Bibliography ==
- Pike, Glenville; Mareeba (Qld. : Shire). Council (1957), Mareeba, the town founded by John Atherton, Mareeba Shire Council
- Atherton, Lucy (1969). "Atherton, John (1837–1913)". Australian Dictionary of Biography.
- Bolton, Geoffrey Curgenven. A Thousand Miles Away : A History of North Queensland to 1920. Australian National University Press, 1963
- Votes and Proceedings (Legislative Assembly, Queensland), 1886, 2, 1113
- John Atherton family letters, 1862-1958 (State Library of Queensland)
