= Edwin Fowles =

Australian barrister, journalist & politician (1871–1945)

The Hon Edwin Wesley Howard Fowles
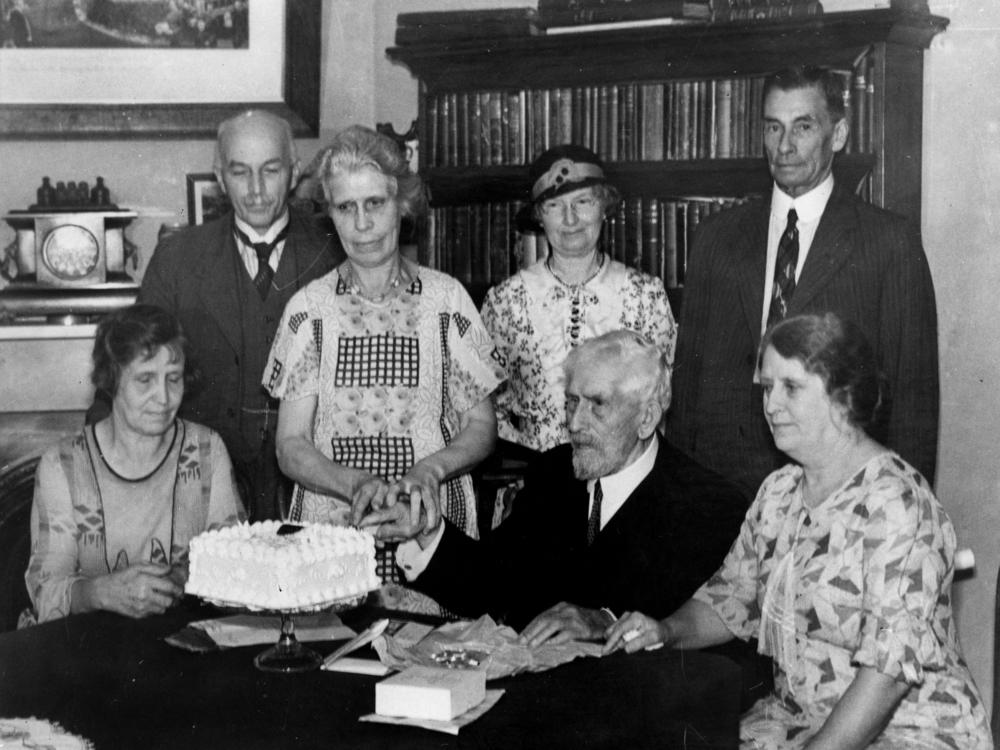
- Edwin Fowles (standing, on left) with the Glassey family ca. 1926

Member of the Queensland Legislative Council
- In office 1 July 1912 – 23 March 1922

Personal details
- Born: Edwin Wesley Howard Fowles; 17 June 1871 Oxley, Queensland, Australia
- Died: 29 December 1945 (aged 74) Brisbane, Queensland, Australia
- Spouse: Janet Mary Archibald (m.1904 d.1966)
- Occupation: Barrister, journalist, schoolteacher

Edwin Wesley Howard Fowles (17 June 1871 – 29 December 1945) was a Barrister, Journalist, and member of the Queensland Legislative Council.

== Early life ==
Fowles was born in December 1871 at Oxley, Queensland, to William Fowles, schoolteacher, and his wife Nancy (née Whittle). He began his education at home, being taught by his father before attending Brisbane Normal School. In 1884 Fowles won a government scholarship to Brisbane Grammar School, winning the Lilley medal in 1887 before attending Ormond College at Melbourne University, obtaining a Bachelor of Arts in 1893, then a Master of Arts and Bachelor of Laws in 1895.

He began his teaching career in 1895 and Cumloden College, Melbourne as a resident master. He briefly returned to Queensland to teach at Maryborough Boys Grammar School before travelling back to Victoria, this time teaching at Geelong College. He was admitted to the Bar in 1901 but within a year he was back in Queensland practicing law. He was the Examiner on the Barristers' Board for more than 30 years.

== Political career ==
Fowles first attempt at entering the Queensland Parliament came at the 1912 state election when, representing the Liberals, he was a candidate for the seat of Fortitude Valley but was soundly defeated by David Bowman of the Labor Party.

Just three months after his defeat, Fowles was appointed to the Legislative Council in July 1912 by Queensland Premier, Digby Denham. He had excellent debating skills and a quick wit to stop any would be interjectors. As the unofficial opposition leader in the Council in 1915, Fowles often led his team in rejecting legislation that had been prepared by the Ryan-led Labor government.

Following the council's abolition in 1922, Fowles once again stood as a candidate for Fortitude Valley at the 1923 state election, losing to Labor's Thomas Wilson He had one more attempt at entering the Legislative Assembly in 1926 but once again lost, this time to Peter McLachlan in the seat of Merthyr.

== Personal life ==
In 1904, Fowles married Janet Mary Archibald, the daughter of John Archibald (also a Member of the Queensland Legislative Council). Fowles died in 1945 and following a service at Kingsholme Methodist Church was cremated at Mount Thompson crematorium.

== Music ==
Doctor Fowles composed two suites of hymns, published around 1932, among others.
