= Ernest Atherton =

Australian politician

The Honourable Ernest Atherton
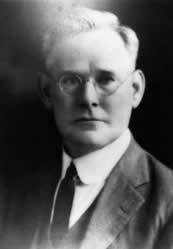

Member of the Queensland Legislative Assembly for Chillagoe
- In office 11 May 1929 – 10 June 1932
- Preceded by: John O'Keefe
- Succeeded by: Seat abolished

Personal details
- Born: Ernest Albert Atherton; 22 March 1879 Mareeba, Queensland, Australia
- Died: 29 June 1954 (aged 75) Mareeba, Queensland, Australia
- Party: Country and Progressive National Party
- Spouse: Honoria Christiana Svendsen OBE (m.1912 d.1975)
- Relations: John Atherton (father)
- Occupation: Butcher, farmer

Ernest Albert Atherton (22 March 1879 – 29 June 1954) was a farmer and member of the Queensland Legislative Assembly.

== Early days ==
Atherton was the youngest son of John Atherton (pioneer) and his wife Catherine (née Grainger). The family had settled on the extensive Emerald End cattle station and their station homestead was attacked many times by bands of indigenous people. He was educated at Cairns State School and also received private tuition in Port Douglas. When he finished his education he spent time as a butcher and storekeeper before becoming a sugar cane and dairy farmer.

== Political career ==
After being the first chairman of the Barron Shire Council, at the 1929 state election, Atherton contested the seat of Chillagoe for the Country and Progressive National Party and defeated Labor sitting member, John O'Keefe. He was immediately elevated to the ministry as the Secretary for Mines in the Moore Ministry but by the 1932 state election Chillagoe had been abolished. He stood for the new seat of The Tableland, but was defeated by Labor candidate Harry Bruce.

== Personal life ==
On 10 April 1912, Atherton married Honoria Christiana Svendsen (died 1975) and together had two sons and one daughter. Honoria went on to be President of Queensland CWA and earned herself an OBE.

Atherton died in June 1954 and was buried in the Atherton family cemetery at Emerald End.

Parliament of Queensland
Preceded by John O'Keefe	Member for Chillagoe; 1929–1932	Abolished
