= Norman Mighell =

Australian Army Officer, company director, public servant & diplomat (1894–1955)

Sir Norman Mighell CMG
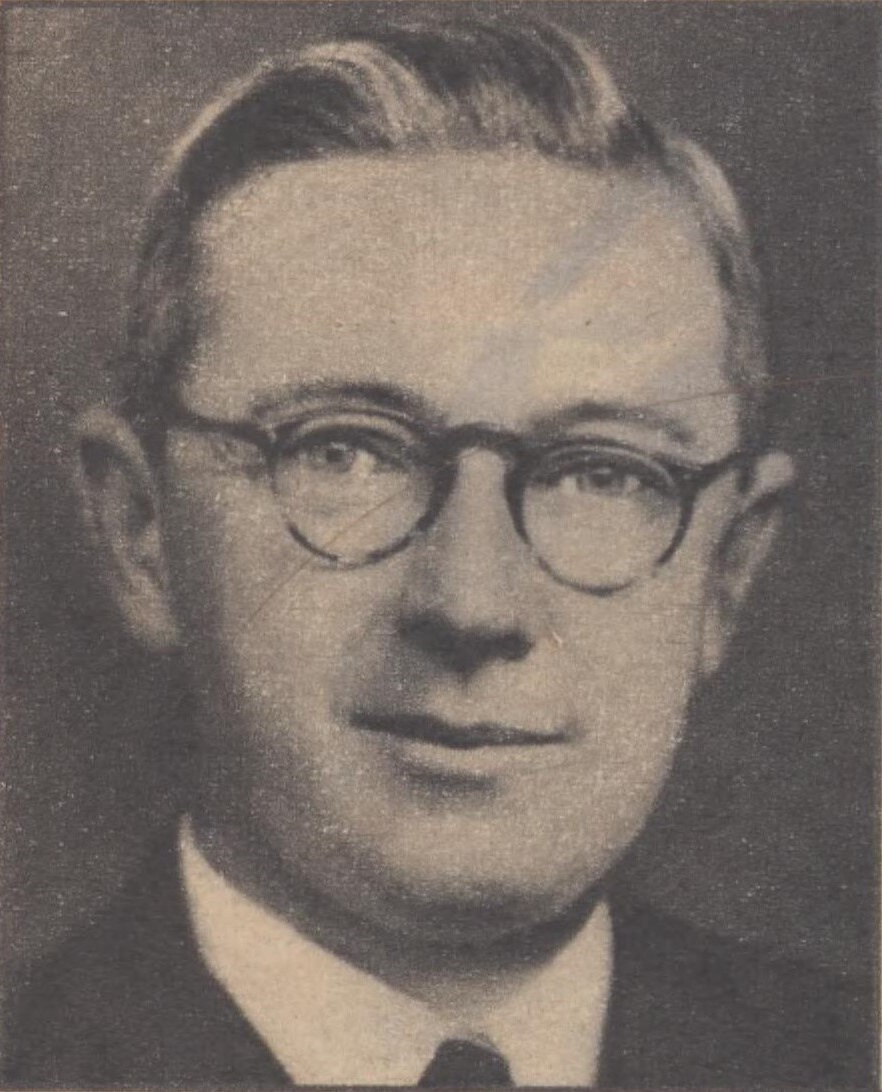
- Born: Norman Rupert Mighell; 12 June 1894; Mackay, Queensland
- Died: 13 April 1955 (aged 60); East Melbourne, Victoria
- Resting place: Melbourne General Cemetery
- Occupations: ANZAC officer, public servant, diplomat, solicitor, company director
- Height: 5 ft 11 in (1.80 m)
- Spouse: Marjorie (m. 1920)

Sir Norman Rupert Mighell KCMG (12 June 1894 – 13 April 1955) was an Australian ANZAC Officer, Gallipoli survivor, company director, public servant, and diplomat. He was considered a well-known public figure after his return from service in the Australian Infantry Force in Gallipoli and was a leader in the founding of the Queensland RSL movement, later becoming its president. After his military service, Mighell directed many companies and later served Australia as the Deputy High Commissioner for Australia in London.

== Early and military life ==
Sir Norman Rupert Mighell was born on 12 June 1894 at Mackay, Queensland, second son of Alfred William Mighell, an accountant from England, and his Queensland-born wife Mary Anne, née O'Donohue. Growing up, Norman was educated at St Joseph's College (now Gregory Terrace), Brisbane. Norman worked as an articled clerk at Gordonvale and studied law. He was mobilised in the Militia in August 1914 and served briefly with the garrison on Thursday Island before enlisting in the Australian Imperial Force on 3 November. Five ft 11 ins (180 cm) tall and weighing 10 st. 6 lb. (66 kg), he had grey eyes and light brown hair. As a sergeant in the 15th Battalion, he was among the first Australian troops to land at Gallipoli on 25 April 1915, sustaining severe wounds which plagued him for the rest of his life. He was admitted to hospital in England in June, repatriated in November, and discharged from the A.I.F. on 14 June 1916.

== Post-war service ==
After serving as an ANZAC officer, Norman was admitted as a solicitor on 30 April 1918. He practised law at Innisfail (until 1925) and then in Brisbane. Norman married Marjorie Draper on 23 June 1920 in a private ceremony. The wedding dinner took place at the Strand Hotel. Sir Norman was the Country and Progressive National Party candidate for the seat of Herbert in the 1926 Queensland state election. He did not win the seat, but according to the Cairns Post he was well received at many functions ahead of the election. Mighell was also a foundation member (1928) of the Brisbane Legacy Club and president (1928–29) of the Queensland branch of the Returned Sailors' and Soldiers' Imperial League of Australia. On 16 July 1929 he was admitted to the Bar. That year he became chairman of No.1 War Pensions Assessment Appeal Tribunal.

In 1935 Mighell was appointed chairman of the Repatriation Commission, Melbourne. Fearing that ex-servicemen and women might lose more than they gained, he resisted moves in the late 1930s to reform repatriation legislation, particularly the proposal to subject war pensioners to a means test. In addition, he opposed the Menzies government's decision (1940) to remove the pension entitlement of an ex-serviceman's de facto wife when his lawful wife received or claimed the benefit. Mighell also took a special interest in the education of the children of deceased or disabled veterans. During World War II he warned the government against permitting people with disabilities to enlist in the armed forces because they might later qualify for pensions.

Appointed Commonwealth coal commissioner in August 1941 (head of the Coal Commission, 1942–44), Mighell held responsibility for the production and distribution of coal until 1946. He endeavoured to increase yields and to handle the many industrial problems which plagued the industry. In 1943 he chaired the committee whose recommendations on the resettlement of armed services personnel formed the basis for the Commonwealth Reconstruction Training Scheme. As Australia's deputy high commissioner in London in 1946-49, he returned to Melbourne in 1950. Mighell had been appointed C.M.G. in 1939. In 1951 he was knighted. He chaired the British Memorial Fund and the Melbourne branch of the Overseas League.

In the 1950s Mighell was chairman of Sulphide Corporation Pty Ltd, Standard Telephones & Cables Pty Ltd, Consolidated Zinc Pty Ltd and the Melbourne board of Atlas Assurance Co. Ltd. As chairman of Territory Enterprises Pty Ltd, he played an important part in developing, on behalf of the Commonwealth government, the uranium deposits at Rum Jungle, Northern Territory. Sir Norman was a director of Zinc Corporation Ltd, New Broken Hill Consolidated Ltd and Anglo-Australian Corporation Pty Ltd. Survived by his wife and son, he died on 13 April 1955 in the Mercy Hospital, East Melbourne, from injuries received in a motorcar accident and was buried in Melbourne General Cemetery.

Diplomatic posts
Preceded by Jack Beasley	Australian High Commissioner to the United Kingdom (Acting); 1949–1950	Succeeded by Eric Harrison
