= William King (Australian politician) =

Australian politician

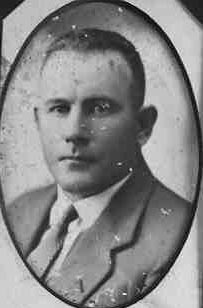

Member of the Queensland Legislative Assembly for Maree
- In office 11 June 1932 – 29 March 1941
- Preceded by: George Tedman
- Succeeded by: Louis Luckins

Personal details
- Born: William Thomas King; 24 May 1893 Beaudesert, Queensland, Australia
- Died: 2 April 1966 (aged 72) Brisbane, Queensland, Australia
- Resting place: Toowong Cemetery
- Party: Labor
- Spouse(s): Annie Cecilia Smith (m.1924 d.1927), Maude Mary Eileen Handlin (m.1947)
- Occupation: Barrister

William Thomas King (24 May 1893 – 2 April 1966) was a member of the Queensland Legislative Assembly.

== Biography ==
King was born in Beaudesert, Queensland, the son of James King and his wife Margaret (née Veale). He was educated at Normanton State School, Cooktown Convent School, Christian Brothers College Ipswich, and Christian Brothers College Brisbane. Upon leaving school he qualified for the civil service, securing the highest pass in his year. He qualified as a solicitor and was called to the bar in 1930.

On 4 November 1924 he married Annie Cecilia Smith and together had two sons. Annie died in 1927 and in 1947 he married Maude Mary Eileen Handlin. King died in April 1966 and was buried in the Toowong Cemetery.

== Public career ==
King, for the Labor Party, was the member for Maree in the Queensland Legislative Assembly from 1932 until his defeat in 1941. He was the Chairman of Committees in 1940-1941 and kept a tight rein on debates and conducted the business of committees in an exemplary fashion.

He was also an alderman in the Brisbane City Council, representing the ward of Brisbane from 1928 to 1931.

Parliament of Queensland
Preceded by George Tedman	Member for Maree; 1932–1941	Succeeded by Louis Luckins
