= Keith Hooper =

Australian politician and carpenter (1919-1977)

The Honourable Keith Hooper

Member of the Queensland Legislative Assembly for Buranda
- In office 3 August 1957 – 28 May 1960
- Preceded by: Dick Brown
- Succeeded by: Seat abolished

Member of the Queensland Legislative Assembly for Greenslopes
- In office 28 May 1960 – 23 August 1977
- Preceded by: New seat
- Succeeded by: Bill Hewitt

Personal details
- Born: Keith William Hooper; 21 August 1919 Boonah, Queensland, Australia
- Died: 23 August 1977 (aged 58) Townsville, Queensland, Australia
- Party: Liberal Party
- Spouse: Betty Florence Ball (m.1947)
- Occupation: Carpenter, builder

Keith William Hooper (21 August 1919 – 23 August 1977) was an Australian politician and carpenter who served as a member of the Queensland Legislative Assembly.

== Early days ==
Keith Hooper was born at Boonah, Queensland, to William Hooper and his wife Ada Ellen (née Moore) and was educated at Boonah, Maroochydore, and Brisbane state schools. He began work in retail before joining the A.I.F. in 1940 where he served with the 2/10 Field Regiment attached to the ill-fated Eighth Division in WWII.

In 1942 Hooper was captured by the Japanese and taken to the notorious Changi prison. The following year he was taken to Japan where he was held at the Kobe House and Nomachi prison camps until the end of the war in August 1945. He wore a steel brace from his armpit to his hip and walked with a limp due to injuries suffered while a prisoner of war and at one stage was clinically dead until he was revived with a shot of adrenalin by Queenslander Dr Clive Boyce, a fellow prisoner. For his service including the militia pre-World War Two with the 11th Brigade he was awarded the Efficiency Medal for efficient service and good conduct. After his discharge in 1946, he trained as a carpenter and joiner and prior to entering parliament ran his own building contracting business.

== Political career ==
At the 1957 Queensland state election, Hooper, representing the Liberal Party, won the seat of Buranda by defeating the long-serving Labor member, Dick Brown. By the time of the next state election, his seat of Buranda was abolished to make way for the new seat of Greenslopes. Hooper went on to represent that seat until 1977.

His Parliamentary Service included being Chairman of Committees and Deputy Speaker for a record term from 22 August 1963 until 20 June 1972 and Minister for Transport from 20 June 1972 until 23 August 1977.

== Public life ==
Leader Parliamentary delegation to Papua New Guinea and South East Asia 1974; Delegate General Conference Commonwealth Parliamentary Association Kuala Lumpur 1963; Executive Member Commonwealth Parliamentary Association (Qld Branch); Member Parliamentary Delegation to South East Asia 1968; Chairman Government Committee Inquiring into Consumer Affairs 1969; Member of the following Parliamentary Committees-Printing (1957-1969) Buildings (1960–1962); Standing Orders (1963–1971) (Ref Qld Parliamentary Handbook 1977 and family)

== Community service ==
On numerous occasions he was Queensland and Australian National President of the Ex-Prisoners of War Association and was awarded honorary life membership, a charter board member and later President of the Asthma Foundation of Queensland and long-term President of the Qld Training and Placement Centre for the Blind at Annerley and President of the Qld Deaf School Parents and Citizens Association and an Honorary Member of Coorparoo Lions Club.

== Personal life ==
On the 8 February 1947, Hooper married Betty Florence Ball and together had two daughters Barbara b. 1949 and Wendy b. 1953. He died in Townsville in 1977, one day after submitting his resignation from parliament and was accorded a state funeral.

Parliament of Queensland
Preceded by Dick Brown	Member for Buranda; 1957–1960	Abolished
New seat	Member for Greenslopes; 1960–1977	Succeeded by Bill Hewitt
