= John Huxham (politician) =

Australian politician

The Hon John Huxham
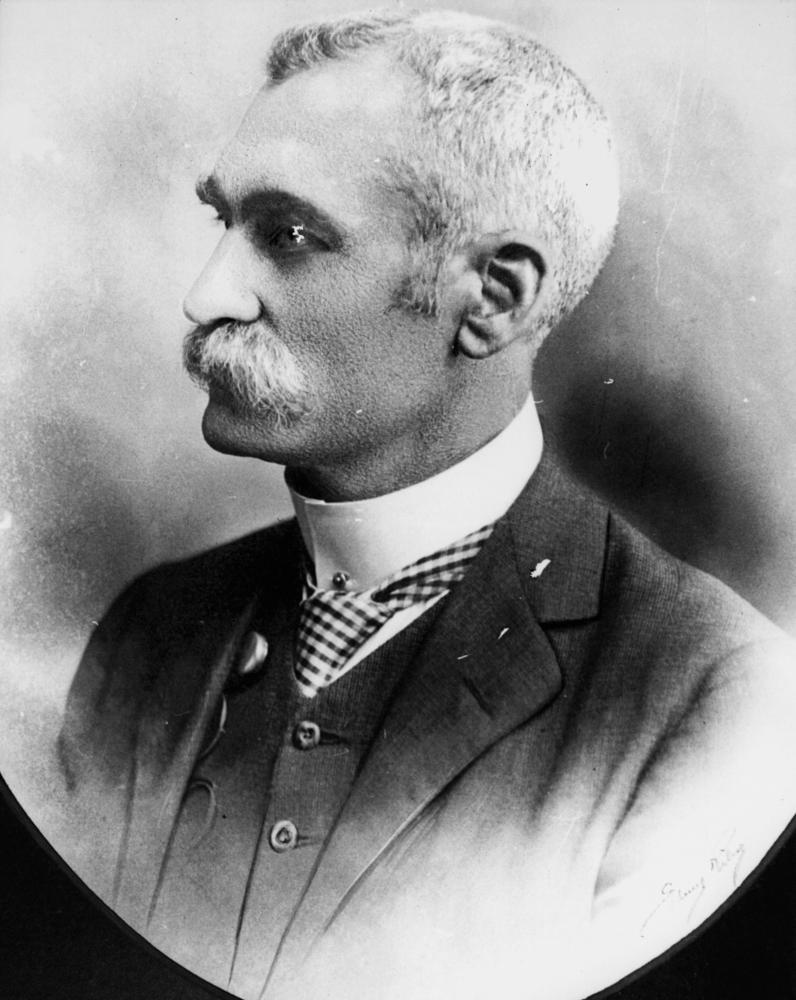

Member of the Queensland Legislative Assembly for Brisbane South
- In office 5 February 1908 – 2 October 1909
- Preceded by: Thomas Bouchard
- Succeeded by: James Allan

Member of the Queensland Legislative Assembly for Buranda
- In office 27 April 1912 – 31 July 1924
- Preceded by: New seat
- Succeeded by: Ted Hanson

Personal details
- Born: Samuel John Chapman Huxham; 14 May 1861 Ivybridge, Devon, England
- Died: 4 August 1949 (aged 88) Brisbane, Queensland, Australia
- Resting place: South Brisbane Cemetery
- Party: Labor
- Spouse(s): Eliza Jane Bubb (m.1884 d.1896), Helen Julia Meiklejohn (née Dougherty) (m.1897 d.1924)
- Occupation: Accountant

John Saunders Huxham (14 May 1861 – 4 August 1949) was an accountant and a member of the Queensland Legislative Assembly.

== Early life ==
Huxham was born in Ivybridge, Devon, to parents Simon Huxham, a labourer, and his wife Agnes (née Chapman). He was born Samuel John Chapman Huxham but changed his name to John Saunders Huxham later in life. Educated in London and beforehand at Ivybridge Dame School, which he later described as "harsh and desolate" where punishment consisted of "confinement in a dark cellar", he left school at age 12 to become a merchant seaman, which on occasions took him to Australia.

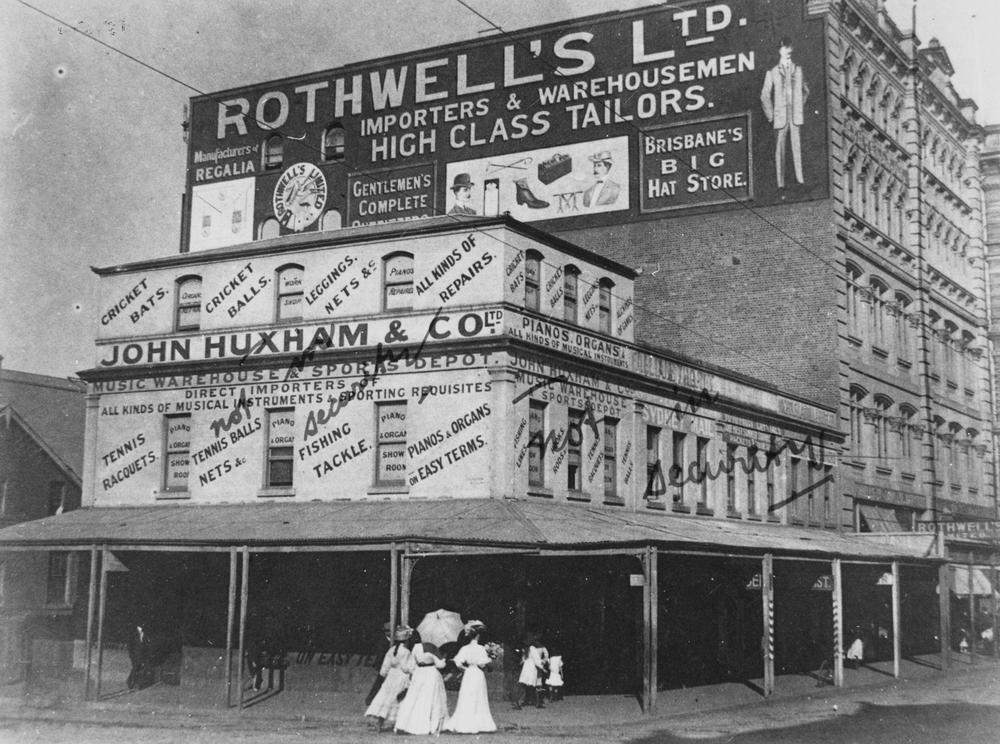
John Huxham & Co. at the intersection of Edward and Adelaide Streets, Brisbane, ca. 1905

In 1879, he settled in Sydney and found work as a bookseller's accountant before heading to Townsville in 1889 to work for the general merchants, Alfred Shaw & Co. In April 1893, he transferred to Brisbane to work in Shaw's Brisbane office. Huxham left Alfred Shaw & Co. to begin work with music and instrument retailers, Pollard & Co. When the firm closed, he went into partnership with Alex McKenzie to form John Huxham Co., importers, and retailers of sporting and musical goods.

== Political career ==
Representing the Labour Party, Huxham was a candidate for the seat of Brisbane South at the 1907 Queensland state election but was defeated by Opposition candidates William Stephens and Thomas Bouchard.

In 1908, the people of Queensland were back at the polls, and Huxham once again contested Brisbane South, this time successfully. He held the seat until 1909 when he was defeated at that year's state elections.

At the 1912 state election, Huxham contested the newly created seat of Buranda where he once again found himself opposed by William Stephens. Huxham defeated him by 2,210 votes to 1,747 to win the seat, holding it until 1924 when he retired from politics.

During his time in parliament, he was Minister without Office in 1915–1916, Home Secretary in 1916–1919, and Secretary for Public Instruction in 1919–1924. Having taught at Sydney's "ragged schools" in the 1880s made Huxham a strong advocate for the underprivileged or handicapped. His daughter was blind from the age of seven due to meningitis, and Huxham took an active interest in the Queensland Blind, Deaf and Dumb Institute where she was a teacher, and he was made a life member of the institute in 1915.

In parliament, Huxham would sit quietly for long periods, "legs crossed, head bent slightly forward, arms folded". He was a moderate and urged cooperation between the political parties for "the good of the people". Though this may have been seen as a sign of weakness, he stood side by side with the unionists in the Brisbane general strike in 1912, and as a consequence, he claimed his actions lost him friends and business.

In 1924, Huxham was appointed Agent-General for Queensland in London, holding the role until 1929.

== Personal life ==
In 1884, Huxham married Eliza Jane Bubb (died 1896) in Sydney, and together they had five children. The next year, he married Helen Julia Meiklejohn (née Dougherty), and they had one daughter. Helen died soon after arriving in London for her husband to take up the role of Agent-General for Queensland.

Huxham died in August 1949. His funeral proceeded from the Vulture Street Baptist church at South Brisbane to the South Brisbane Cemetery. His estate, valued for probate at £22,372, was used to establish the Helen Huxham Hostel for blind girls in memory of his second wife.

Parliament of Queensland
Preceded by Thomas Bouchard	Member for Brisbane South; 1908–1909	Succeeded by James Allan
New seat	Member for Buranda; 1912–1924	Succeeded by Ted Hanson
