= Louis Luckins =

Louis Wells Luckins was a member of the Queensland Legislative Assembly

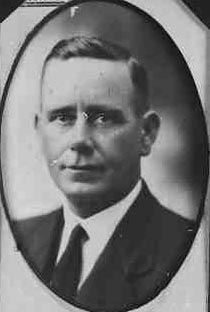

Member of the Queensland Legislative Assembly for Maree
- In office 29 March 1941 – 29 April 1950
- Preceded by: William King
- Succeeded by: Seat abolished

Member of the Queensland Legislative Assembly for Norman
- In office 29 April 1950 – 6 March 1953
- Preceded by: New seat
- Succeeded by: William Baxter

Personal details
- Born: Louis Wells Luckins; 24 June 1885 Springsure, Queensland, Australia
- Died: 6 July 1970 (aged 85) Brisbane, Queensland, Australia
- Party: Liberal Party
- Other political affiliations: United Australia Party, Queensland People's Party, Independent
- Spouse: Frances Mary Clews (m.1914 d.1974)
- Occupation: Valuer and real estate agent

Louis Wells Luckins (24 June 1885 – 6 July 1970) was a member of the Queensland Legislative Assembly.

== Biography ==
Luckins was born in Springsure, Queensland, the son of Louis Wells Luckins Snr and his wife Bridget Mary (née Armitage). He was educated at Mount Morgan State School and after leaving school he served in the Natal Civil Service from 1903 to 1906. He fought in the Native Rebellion there in 1906 where he was awarded the medal and clasp before heading to China where he was an officer in the Chinese Maritime Customs from 1907 to 1914. He fought in the 1911 Revolution and received a Chinese decoration by the Viceroy of Canton for saving lives in the 1907 typhoon in China.

After receiving Imperial Customs appointments in Batavia, Singapore, Philippines and Western Australia he came to Brisbane in 1917 where he was a valuer and real estate agent until 1944.

On 7 October 1914 Luckins married Frances Mary Clews (died 1974) and together had one son. He died in 1970 and was cremated at Mt Thompson Crematorium.

== Public career ==
Luckins was an alderman in the Brisbane City Council on two separate occasions, the first from 1928 to 1931 and the second time from 1935 to 1941. He was the chairman of the Council Transport Committee from 1935 to 1941.

Representing the United Australia Party, he then won the seat of Maree in the Queensland Legislative Assembly in 1941. The seat of Maree was abolished before the 1950 state election and Luckins won the new seat of Norman where he served another three years. By this time he was a member of the Liberal Party.

He was a member of the Maree Progress Association, the Kangaroo Point School Committee, and vice-president of the East Brisbane Automobile Club.

Parliament of Queensland
Preceded by William King	Member for Maree; 1941–1950	Abolished
New seat	Member for Norman; 1950–1953	Succeeded by William Baxter
