= Dick Brown (politician) =

Australian politician

Member of the Queensland Legislative Assembly for Buranda
- In office 3 May 1947 – 3 August 1957
- Preceded by: Ted Hanson
- Succeeded by: Keith Hooper

Personal details
- Born: Richard Kidston Brown; 16 May 1887 Dumbarton, Scotland
- Died: 22 January 1971 (aged 83 ) Brisbane, Queensland, Australia
- Party: Labor
- Spouse: Lillian May Beeston (m.1911 d.1980)
- Relations: John Brown (brother)
- Occupation: Blacksmith, Insurance inspector

Richard Kidston Brown (1887 – 22 January 1971) was a Blacksmith and member of the Queensland Legislative Assembly.

== Early days ==
Brown was born at Dumbarton, Scotland, to John Brown, and his wife Janet (née Kidston). Arriving with his family in 1889, he attended South Brisbane State School before commencing work in the family business as a blacksmith at Coorparoo. In 1922 he gained employment as an insurance inspector.

As a youth, Brown joined the Thompson Estate Harriers Athletic Club, an association that was to last 71 years including 33 years as its president. He excelled at walking and represented Queensland in the national championships.

== Political career ==
After serving as an alderman in the Stephens Shire Council, Brown, standing for the Labor Party, won the safe labor seat of Buranda at the 1947 state election. He held the seat until his defeat in 1957, losing to Keith Hooper of the Liberal Party. His brother, John Brown, also served in the Queensland Parliament as the member for Logan from 1935 until 1944.

== Personal life ==
On the 28 October 1911, Brown married Lillian May Beeston (died 1980) at Thompson Estate Methodist Church and together had two sons and three daughters. He had been at one time a Sunday School teacher at the Annerley Methodist Church where he regularly attended services for 50 years. A member of the Masons, Brown took a keen interest in the initial construction of the Freemasons Home at Sandgate and although he had never been a returned soldier, Brown was so highly respected that he was made Patron of the Stephens RSL.

Brown was also involved in several sporting organisations. He was closely associated with the Eastern Suburbs Rugby League Club, both at senior level and was president of the junior club for a record term. He was also a member of both the Annerly and Buranda Bowls clubs and the green at Buranda was named the R.K. Brown Green in his honour. He was long-term Patron of Eastern Suburbs Cricket Club

A man who served his State and its people with considerable credit, Brown died in Brisbane in 1971 and was cremated at Mount Thompson Crematorium.

Parliament of Queensland
Preceded by Ted Hanson	Member for Buranda; 1947–1957	Succeeded by Keith Hooper
