= George Duffy =

Australian politician from Queensland

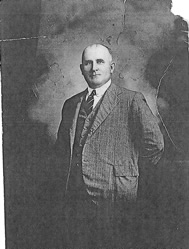

Member of the Queensland Legislative Assembly for Eacham
- In office 11 May 1929 – 23 March 1932
- Preceded by: Cornelius Ryan
- Succeeded by: Seat abolished

Personal details
- Born: George Alfred Duffy; 1887 Lismore, New South Wales, Australia
- Died: 1 April 1941 (aged 53 or 54) Albion, Brisbane, Queensland, Australia
- Resting place: Lutwyche Cemetery
- Party: CPNP
- Spouse: Rosa Lilian Belson (m.1917 d.1960)
- Occupation: Businessman

George Alfred Duffy (1887 – 1 April 1941) was a businessman and member of the Queensland Legislative Assembly.

== Early life ==
Duffy was born in Lismore, New South Wales, to parents Daniel Duffy and his wife Sarah Ann (née Beddoes). He was educated at Lismore Convent School before making his way to northern Queensland. There he conducted business in Yungaburra and Eacham.

On 12 September 1917 Duffy married Rosa Lilian Belson (died 1960) in Atherton and together had three sons.

== Political career ==
Duffy represented the seat of Eacham for the CPNP from 1929 until 1932.

== Later life ==
Duffy died in 1941 at Albion and was buried in Lutwyche Cemetery.

Parliament of Queensland
Preceded by Cornelius Ryan	Member for Eacham; 1929–1932	Abolished
