= George Tedman =

Australian politician

Member of the Queensland Legislative Assembly for Maree
- In office 11 May 1929 – 11 June 1932
- Preceded by: William Bertram
- Succeeded by: William King

Personal details
- Born: George Tedman; 1885 London, England
- Died: 15 July 1976 (aged 91) Sandgate, Queensland, Australia
- Party: CPNP
- Spouse: Margaret Annie Elizabeth Dougherty (m.1914 d.1974)
- Occupation: Grocer

George Tedman (1885 – 15 July 1976) was a member of the Queensland Legislative Assembly.

== Biography ==
Tedman was born in London, England, the son of James John Dodd Tedman and his wife Ellen Mary (née Sales). He came to Australia as a child and was educated at Ipswich State School. He was a grocer at South Brisbane and produce merchant at Woolloongabba.

He married Margaret Annie Elizabeth Dougherty in 1914 (died 1974) and together had one son and one daughter. Tedman died in July 1976 and was cremated at Mt Thompson Crematorium.

== Public career ==
Tedman, representing the Country and Progressive National Party was the member for Maree in the Queensland Legislative Assembly from 1929 until his retirement three years later in 1932.

He was a member of the Pineapple Rovers Football Club and the Kangaroo Point Cricket Club.

Parliament of Queensland
Preceded by William Bertram	Member for Maree; 1929–1932	Succeeded by William King
