= Ted Hanson =

Australian plumber and politician (1878–1950)

The Hon Edward Hanson
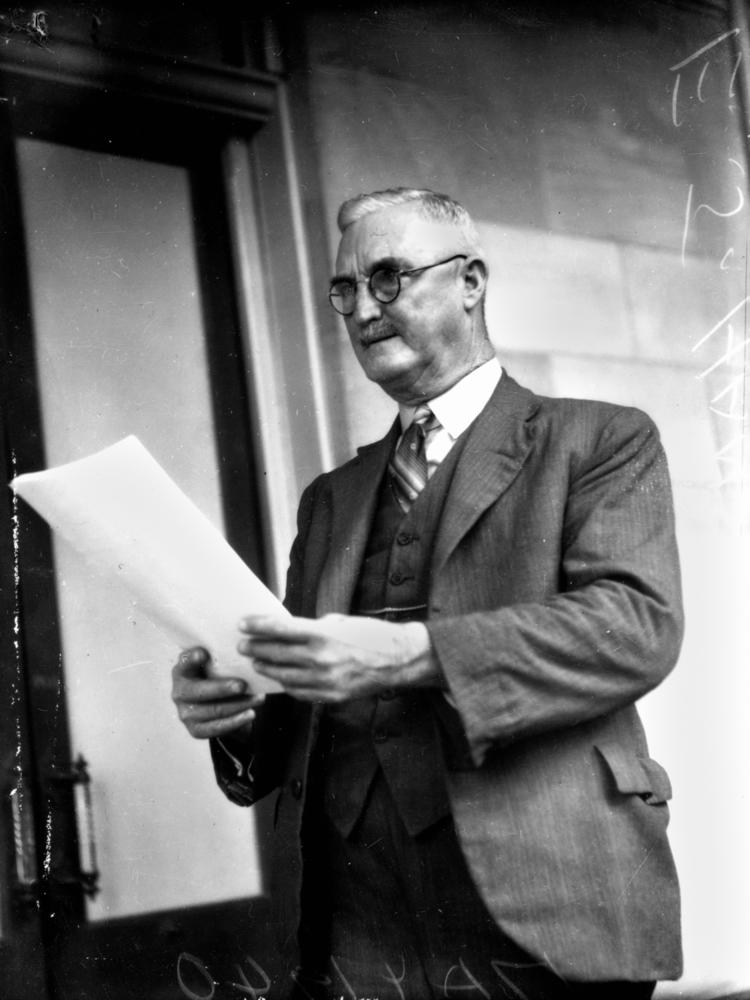

Speaker of the Queensland Legislative Assembly
- In office 8 August 1939 – 31 July 1944
- Preceded by: George Pollock
- Succeeded by: Samuel Brassington
- Constituency: Buranda

Member of the Queensland Legislative Assembly for Buranda
- In office 16 August 1924 – 3 May 1947
- Preceded by: John Huxham
- Succeeded by: Richard Brown

Member of the Queensland Legislative Council
- In office 19 February 1920 – 23 March 1922

Personal details
- Born: Edward Joseph Hanson; 5 September 1878 Brisbane, Queensland, Australia
- Died: 26 October 1950 (aged 72) Brisbane, Queensland, Australia
- Party: Labor
- Spouse: Elizabeth McKay (m.1903 d.1969)
- Occupation: Plumber, Trade union secretary

Edward Joseph Hanson (5 September 1878 – 26 October 1950) was a plumber, union organiser and politician in Brisbane, Queensland, Australia. He was a Member of the Queensland Legislative Council and the Queensland Legislative Assembly.

== Early life ==
Edward Joseph Hanson was born in Woolloongabba, Brisbane on 5 September 1878, the son of John Hanson and his wife Mary Ann (née Castree).

He served in the Second Boer War 1899–1901.

On 19 August, Edward, known as Ted, was married to Elizabeth McKay; they had eight children. He was also a founding member of the PGEUA (Plumbers and Gasfitters Employees Union of Australia) Qld branch in 1904. He was later its first full-time Secretary/Organiser (1915–1924). From 1916 to 1922 he was a member of the Metropolitan Water and Sewerage Board.

== Politics ==
Hanson was a member of the Queensland Legislative Council from 1920 to 1922. After the abolition of the council, he represented the Queensland state electorate of Buranda from 1924 to 1947, and was the Speaker of the Legislative Assembly of Queensland from 8 August 1939 until 31 July 1944. He was the first Speaker of the QLD Parliament to not wear a wig. His daughter Norma, related to her daughter, Caroline Mann-Smith, that Ted said that "I am not wearing a sheep skin on my head". (Norma was aged 19 in 1939). No doubt his reasons were not only this – they were likely to do with disagreement with what he saw as old and unnecessary traditions. (written by Caroline Mann-Smith, as quoted earlier) He was a supporter of the Buranda State Schools Committee and the president of the committee. He was a supporter of the Kent Street Blind, Deaf and Dumb Institution and the chairman of its committee.

== Later life ==
Hanson died on 26 October 1950. He was accorded a state funeral. His funeral cortege was led by the Queensland Mounted Police and was more than a mile long. It travelled along Victoria Bridge, Queen Street and Story Bridge and then to Mount Thompson Crematorium where he was cremated.

== See also ==
- Members of the Queensland Legislative Council, 1917–1922
- Members of the Queensland Legislative Assembly, 1923–1926; 1926–1929; 1929–1932; 1932–1935; 1935–1938; 1938–1941; 1941–1944; 1944–1947

Parliament of Queensland
Preceded by George Pollock	Speaker of the Legislative Assembly; 1939– 1944	Succeeded by Samuel Brassington
Preceded by John Huxham	Member for Buranda; 1924–1947	Succeeded by Richard Brown
