= Electoral district of Buranda =

Former state electoral district of Queensland, Australia

Buranda Queensland—Legislative Assembly
- State: Queensland
- Created: 1912
- Abolished: 1960
- Coordinates: 27°31′S 153°04′E

Buranda was a Legislative Assembly electorate in the state of Queensland, Australia.

== History ==
Buranda was created by the 1910 Electoral Districts Act, taking effect at the 1912 elections. It consisted broadly of the south-west corner of the former Electoral district of Bulimba and was located south-east of Brisbane. It was abolished in the 1959 redistribution (taking effect at the 1960 elections), being incorporated into the newly created Electoral district of Greenslopes.

== Members ==
The following people were elected in the seat of Buranda:

Member	Party	Term detail
John Huxham	Labor	1912–1924
Ted Hanson	Labor	1924–1947
Dick Brown	Labor	1947–1957
Keith Hooper	Liberal	1957–1960

== See also ==
- Electoral districts of Queensland
- Members of the Queensland Legislative Assembly by year
- Category:Members of the Queensland Legislative Assembly by name
