= Electoral district of Eacham =

Eacham Queensland—Legislative Assembly
- State: Queensland
- Created: 1912
- Abolished: 1932
- Namesake: Eacham, Queensland
- Demographic: Northern Rural
- Coordinates: 17°21′S 145°36′E

The electoral district of Eacham was a Legislative Assembly electorate in the state of Queensland. It was created in a redistribution ahead of the 1912 state election and existed until the 1932 state election.

Based in the Atherton Tableland west of Cairns, Eacham incorporated much of the former Electoral district of Woothakata.

== Members for Eacham ==
The members for Eacham were:

Member	Party	Term
William Gillies	Labor	Apr 1912 – Oct 1925
Cornelius Ryan	Labor	Jan 1926 – May 1929
George Duffy	CPNP	May 1929 – Mar 1932

== See also ==
- Electoral districts of Queensland
- Members of the Queensland Legislative Assembly by year
- Category:Members of the Queensland Legislative Assembly by name
