= Electoral district of Chillagoe =

Chillagoe Queensland—Legislative Assembly
- State: Queensland
- Created: 1912
- Abolished: 1932
- Namesake: Chillagoe
- Demographic: Rural
- Coordinates: 17°09′S 144°31′E

Chillagoe was an electoral district of the Legislative Assembly in the Australian state of Queensland from 1912 to 1932.

The district was based on the Atherton Tablelands, based on the former Electoral district of Woothakata. Chillagoe was replaced by Electoral district of The Tableland at the 1932 elections.

== Members for Chillagoe ==
The members for Chillagoe were:

Member	Party	Term
Ted Theodore	Labor	1912 – 1925
John O'Keefe	Labor	1926 – 1929
Ernest Atherton	CPNP	1929 – 1932

== See also ==
- Electoral districts of Queensland
- Members of the Queensland Legislative Assembly by year
- Category:Members of the Queensland Legislative Assembly by name
