= William Bertram (politician) =

Australian politician

Speaker of the Queensland Legislative Assembly
- In office 9 January 1920 – 11 May 1929
- Preceded by: William Lennon
- Succeeded by: Charles Taylor
- Constituency: Maree

Member of the Queensland Legislative Assembly for Maree
- In office 27 April 1912 – 11 May 1929
- Preceded by: New seat
- Succeeded by: George Tedman

Personal details
- Born: William Bertram; 11 January 1875 Hamilton, South Lanarkshire, Scotland
- Died: 11 June 1957 (aged 82) Coorparoo, Queensland, Australia
- Party: Labor
- Occupation: Union organizer

William Bertram (11 January 1875 – 11 June 1957) was an Australian politician. He was the Labor member for Maree in the Legislative Assembly of Queensland from 1912 to 1929. He served as Speaker of the Legislative Assembly of Queensland from 1920 to 1929. His grandson, Harold Lowes, was a Liberal member of the Legislative Assembly from 1974 to 1977.

Parliament of Queensland
Preceded by William Lennon	Speaker of the Legislative Assembly; 1920– 1929	Succeeded by Charles Taylor
New seat	Member for Maree; 1912 - 1929	Succeeded by George Tedman
