= Cornelius Ryan (politician) =

Australian politician

Member of the Queensland Legislative Assembly for Eacham
- In office 16 Jan 1926 – 11 May 1929
- Preceded by: William Gillies
- Succeeded by: George Duffy

Personal details
- Born: Cornelius James Ryan; 1882 Lowther, New South Wales, Australia
- Died: 27 November 1939 (aged 56 or 57) Townsville, Queensland, Australia
- Resting place: Belgian Gardens Cemetery
- Party: Labor
- Spouse: Eileen Florence Casey (m.1911 d.1952)
- Occupation: Publican

Cornelius James Ryan (1882 – 27 November 1939) was a publican and member of the Queensland Legislative Assembly.

On 27 February 1911 he married Eileen Florence Casey (died 1952) at Chillagoe and together had two sons and one daughter. He died at Townsville in 1939 and was buried in the Belgian Gardens Cemetery.

== Political career ==
Ryan represented the seat of Eacham for the Labor from 1926 until 1929.

Parliament of Queensland
Preceded by William Gillies	Member for Eacham; 1926–1929	Succeeded by George Duffy
