= Electoral district of Maree =

Former state electoral district of Queensland, Australia

Maree Queensland—Legislative Assembly
- State: Queensland
- Created: 1912
- Abolished: 1950
- Demographic: Metropolitan
- Coordinates: 27°28′S 153°02′E

Maree was a Legislative Assembly electorate in the state of Queensland, Australia.

== History ==
Maree was created by the 1910 Electoral Districts Act, taking effect at the 1912 elections. It was based on Kangaroo Point, Queensland and consisted of the slightly altered Electoral district of Woolloongabba, which was abolished in 1912.

Most of the area of Maree and was incorporated into the Electoral district of Norman in 1950.

== Members ==
The following people were elected in the seat of Maree:

Member	Party	Term
William Bertram	Labor	1912 – 1929
George Tedman	CPNP	1929 – 1932
William King	Labor	1932 – 1941
Louis Luckins	United Australia	1941 – 1944
Louis Luckins	Independent	1944 – 1947
Louis Luckins	Qld. People's	1947 – 1950

== See also ==
- Electoral districts of Queensland
- Members of the Queensland Legislative Assembly by year
- Category:Members of the Queensland Legislative Assembly by name
