= 1926 Queensland state election =

| ← 1923 | 8 May 1926 | 1929 → |

All 72 seats in the Legislative Assembly of Queensland 37 Assembly seats were needed for a majority
- Turnout: 88.73 (▲6.50 pp)
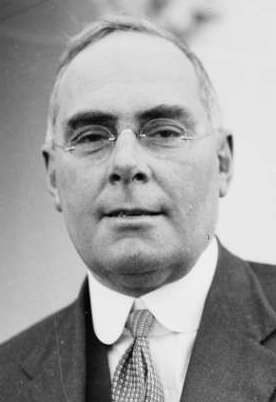

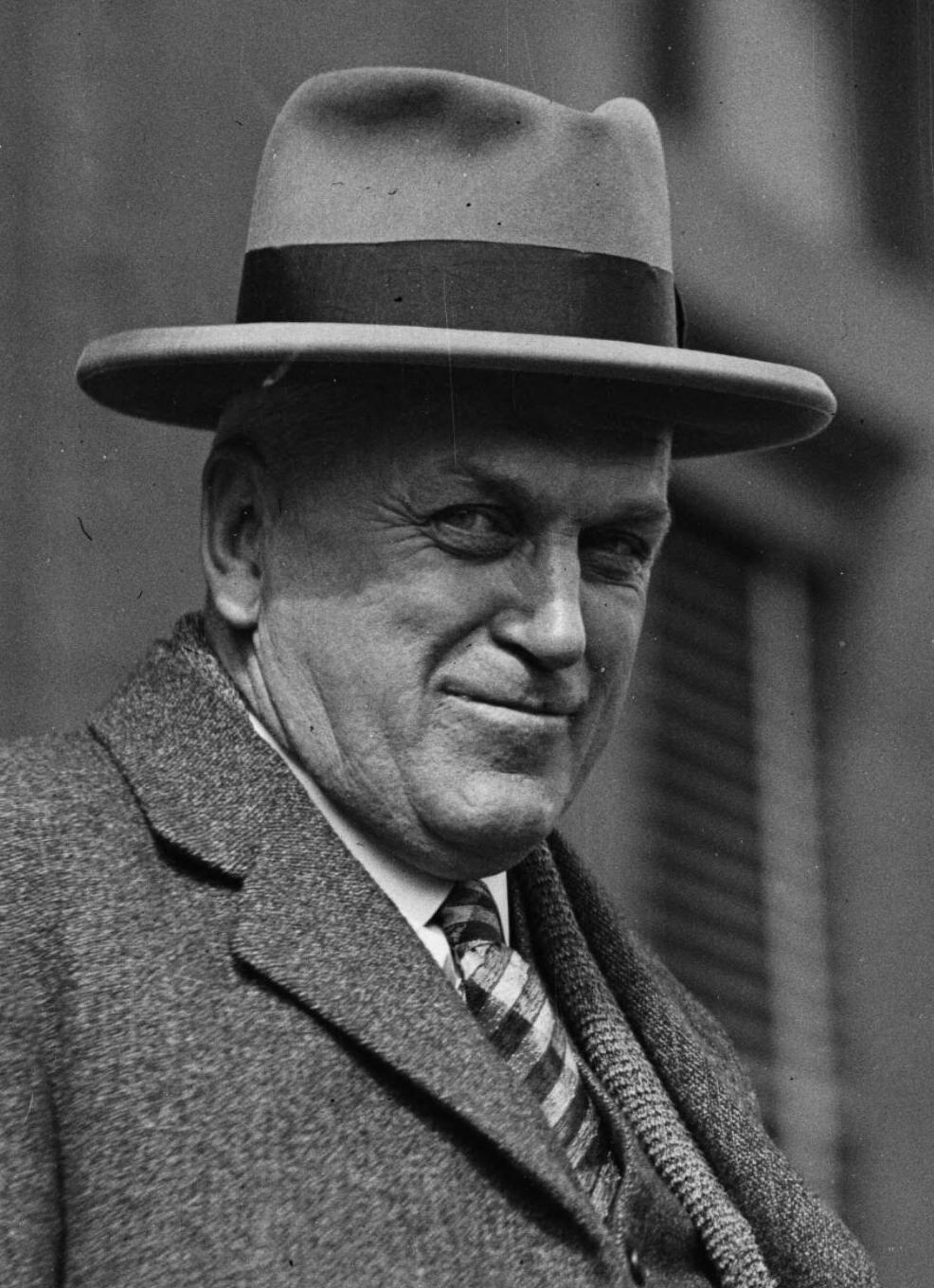
| | First party | Second party |
|---|---|---|
| Leader | William McCormack | Arthur Edward Moore |
| Party | Labor | CPNP |
| Leader since | 22 October 1925 | 19 April 1924 |
| Leader's seat | Cairns | Aubigny |
| Last election | 43 seats, 48.13% | 29 seats, 46.95% |
| Seats won | 43 | 28 |
| Seat change | Steady | ▼1 |
| Popular vote | 189,968 | 192,043 |
| Percentage | 47.96% | 48.48% |
| Swing | ▼0.18 | ▲1.53 |
Premier before election
William McCormack
Labor
Elected Premier
William McCormack
Labor

Elections were held in the Australian state of Queensland on 8 May 1926 to elect the 72 members of the state's Legislative Assembly. The Labor government was seeking its fifth continuous term in office since the 1915 election. William McCormack was contesting his first election as Premier.

During the previous term, the Country and United parties had merged into the Country and Progressive National Party.

== Key dates ==
| Date | Event |
|---|---|
| 8 April 1926 | The Parliament was dissolved. |
| 9 April 1926 | Writs were issued by the Governor to proceed with an election. |
| 16 April 1926 | Close of nominations. |
| 8 May 1926 | Polling day, between the hours of 8am and 6pm. |
| 12 June 1926 | The writ was returned and the results formally declared. |
| 27 July 1926 | Parliament resumed for business. |

== Results ==
Queensland state election, 8 May 1926 Legislative Assembly << 1923–1929 >>
| Enrolled voters | 452,008^{[1]} | | | | |
| Votes cast | 401,055 | | Turnout | 88.73% | +6.50 |
| Informal votes | 4,927 | | Informal | 1.23% | +0.06 |
Summary of votes by party
| Party | Primary votes | % | Swing | Seats | Change |
| Labor | 189,968 | 47.96% | –0.18 | 43 | ± 0 |
| CPNP | 192,043 | 48.48% | +1.53^{[2]} | 28 | – 1 |
| Primary Producers | 7,749 | 1.95% | +0.66 | 1 | + 1 |
| Independent | 6,368 | 1.61% | –2.02 | 0 | ± 0 |
| Total | 396,128 | | | 72 | |

Popular vote
| CPNP | 48.48% |
| Labor | 47.96% |
| Independents | 1.61% |
| Others | 1.95% |

Seats
| Labor | 59.72% |
| CPNP | 38.89% |
| Others | 1.39% |

^{1} 484,212 electors were enrolled to vote at the election, but 5 Labor seats and one CPNP seat were filled without opposition.
^{2} The CPNP result is compared to the combined result for the Queensland United Party and the Country Party in the preceding election.

== Seats changing party representation ==
This table lists changes in party representation at the 1926 election.

| Seat | Incumbent member | Party | New member | Party |
|---|---|---|---|---|
| Dalby | William Vowles | CPNP | Wilfred Russell | Primary Producers |

== See also ==
- Members of the Queensland Legislative Assembly, 1923–1926
- Members of the Queensland Legislative Assembly, 1926–1929
- Candidates of the Queensland state election, 1926
- Theodore Ministry
