= Results of the 2001 Queensland state election =

Queensland state election, 17 February 2001 Legislative Assembly << 1998–2004 >>
Enrolled voters	2,276,044				
Votes cast	2,107,410		Turnout	92.59	–0.26
Informal votes	47,849		Informal	2.29	+0.84
Summary of votes by party
Party	Primary votes	%	Swing	Seats	Change
Labor	1,007,737	48.93	+10.07	66	+22
Liberal	294,968	14.32	–1.77	3	–6
National	291,605	14.16	–1.02	12	–11
One Nation	179,076	8.69	–13.98	3	–8
Greens	51,630	2.51	+0.15	0	±0
City Country Alliance	49,263	2.39	+2.39	0	±0
Democrats	7,029	0.34	–1.27	0	±0
Christian Democrats	919	0.04	–0.07	0	±0
Independent	177,334	8.61	+6.44	5	+3
Total	2,059,561			89	

This is a list of electoral district results for the Queensland 2001 election.

== Results by electoral district ==
=== Albert ===
2001 Queensland state election: Albert
Party	Candidate	Votes	%	±%
Labor	Margaret Keech	11,551	50.6	+13.4
One Nation	Rod Evans	5,438	23.8	−5.1
Liberal	Andrea Johanson	3,092	13.6	+10.2
National	Tony McMullan	2,725	11.9	−13.5
Total formal votes		22,806	97.5	
Informal votes		578	2.5	
Turnout		23,384	92.2	
Two-candidate-preferred result
Labor	Margaret Keech	13,207	62.6	+12.9
One Nation	Rod Evans	7,875	37.4	+37.4
Labor gain from National		Swing	N/A	

=== Algester ===
2001 Queensland state election: Algester
Party	Candidate	Votes	%	±%
Labor	Karen Struthers	15,709	66.7	+18.7
Liberal	Michele Cole	5,343	22.7	−3.0
Independent	Brian Watt	1,575	6.7	+6.7
Christian Democrats	Andrew Lamb	919	3.9	+3.9
Total formal votes		23,546	97.4	
Informal votes		632	2.6	
Turnout		24,178	93.7	
Two-party-preferred result
Labor	Karen Struthers	16,140	72.6	+12.5
Liberal	Michele Cole	6,082	27.4	−12.5
Labor hold		Swing	+12.5	

=== Ashgrove ===
2001 Queensland state election: Ashgrove
Party	Candidate	Votes	%	±%
Labor	Jim Fouras	13,630	55.5	+6.5
Liberal	Bryan Cook	7,263	29.6	−6.4
Greens	Mark Carey-Smith	1,459	5.9	+1.9
Democrats	Brett Matthews	1,300	5.3	+1.8
Independent	Allen Anderson	923	3.8	+3.8
Total formal votes		24,575	98.4	−0.3
Informal votes		414	1.6	+0.3
Turnout		24,989	92.6	
Two-party-preferred result
Labor	Jim Fouras	15,068	65.0	+7.6
Liberal	Bryan Cook	8,102	35.0	−7.6
Labor hold		Swing	+7.6	

=== Aspley ===
2001 Queensland state election: Aspley
Party	Candidate	Votes	%	±%
Labor	Bonny Barry	13,150	54.7	+6.7
Liberal	John Goss	10,894	45.3	−6.7
Total formal votes		24,044	96.9	
Informal votes		770	3.1	
Turnout		24,814	94.1	
Labor gain from Liberal		Swing	+6.7	

=== Barron River ===
2001 Queensland state election: Barron River
Party	Candidate	Votes	%	±%
Labor	Lesley Clark	9,511	43.0	+7.9
Independent	Sno Bonneau	4,213	19.1	+19.1
Liberal	Lyn Warwick	3,588	16.2	−13.1
One Nation	Peter Starr	3,587	16.2	−10.8
Greens	Denis Walls	1,212	5.5	+0.4
Total formal votes		22,111	98.5	
Informal votes		336	1.5	
Turnout		22,447	90.5	
Two-candidate-preferred result
Labor	Lesley Clark	10,759	57.3	+6.4
Independent	Sno Bonneau	8,031	42.7	+42.7
Labor hold		Swing	+6.4	

=== Beaudesert ===
2001 Queensland state election: Beaudesert
Party	Candidate	Votes	%	±%
Labor	Pam Stephenson	8,868	34.1	+7.8
National	Kev Lingard	8,297	31.9	−2.2
One Nation	Rae Benson	7,680	29.5	−2.1
Independent	Kim Limburg	1,166	4.5	+4.5
Total formal votes		26,011	98.4	
Informal votes		433	1.6	
Turnout		26,444	94.3	
Two-party-preferred result
National	Kev Lingard	10,876	52.0	−7.0
Labor	Pam Stephenson	8,868	48.0	+7.0
National hold		Swing	−7.0	

=== Brisbane Central ===
2001 Queensland state election: Brisbane Central
Party	Candidate	Votes	%	±%
Labor	Peter Beattie	14,894	64.7	+11.1
Liberal	Joe Vasta	4,839	21.0	−5.6
Greens	Richard Nielsen	1,579	6.9	+2.6
Independent	Tamara Tonite	974	4.2	+4.2
Independent	Samuel Tornatore	201	0.9	+0.9
Independent	Coral Wynter	200	0.9	+0.9
Independent	Alan Skyring	127	0.6	+0.6
Independent	Dionne Buckley	112	0.5	+0.5
Independent	Jayson Dalton	84	0.4	+0.4
Total formal votes		23,010	98.1	
Informal votes		441	1.9	
Turnout		23,451	88.0	
Two-party-preferred result
Labor	Peter Beattie	15,936	75.0	+10.2
Liberal	Joe Vasta	5,322	25.0	−10.2
Labor hold		Swing	+10.2	

=== Broadwater ===
2001 Queensland state election: Broadwater
Party	Candidate	Votes	%	±%
Labor	Peta-Kaye Croft	12,388	52.4	+23.2
National	Allan Grice	11,231	47.6	+7.3
Total formal votes		23,619	95.6	
Informal votes		1,092	4.4	
Turnout		24,711	90.6	
Labor gain from National		Swing	+13.1	

=== Bulimba ===
2001 Queensland state election: Bulimba
Party	Candidate	Votes	%	±%
Labor	Pat Purcell	16,295	73.2	+16.3
Liberal	Brent Woollett	5,960	26.8	+5.2
Total formal votes		22,255	96.5	
Informal votes		814	3.5	
Turnout		23,069	91.5	
Labor hold		Swing	+4.2	

=== Bundaberg ===
2001 Queensland state election: Bundaberg
Party	Candidate	Votes	%	±%
Labor	Nita Cunningham	15,812	64.9	+23.0
National	David Porter	8,552	35.1	+9.8
Total formal votes		24,364	95.8	
Informal votes		1,079	4.2	
Turnout		25,443	93.7	
Labor hold		Swing	+10.4	

=== Bundamba ===
2001 Queensland state election: Bundamba
Party	Candidate	Votes	%	±%
Labor	Jo-Ann Miller	15,356	71.6	+23.4
Liberal	Mardi McLean	3,196	14.9	+3.0
Greens	John McKeon	2,881	13.4	+10.5
Total formal votes		21,433	96.0	
Informal votes		896	4.0	
Turnout		22,329	93.4	
Two-party-preferred result
Labor	Jo-Ann Miller	16,043	80.9	+15.3
Liberal	Mardi McLean	3,786	19.1	+19.1
Labor hold		Swing	+15.3	

=== Burdekin ===
2001 Queensland state election: Burdekin
Party	Candidate	Votes	%	±%
Labor	Steve Rodgers	7,808	36.7	+3.8
National	Terry Morato	4,836	22.7	−3.2
City Country Alliance	Jeff Knuth	4,439	20.9	+20.9
One Nation	Merle Poletto	4,180	19.7	−15.2
Total formal votes		21,263	98.4	
Informal votes		341	1.6	
Turnout		21,604	92.8	
Two-party-preferred result
Labor	Steve Rodgers	8,863	55.1	+14.0
National	Terry Morato	7,215	44.9	+44.9
Labor gain from One Nation		Swing	+14.0	

=== Burleigh ===
2001 Queensland state election: Burleigh
Party	Candidate	Votes	%	±%
Labor	Christine Smith	11,445	44.3	+12.0
National	Judy Gamin	10,020	38.8	+2.6
One Nation	Colleen Pepperell	4,385	17.0	−4.7
Total formal votes		25,850	97.8	
Informal votes		588	2.2	
Turnout		26,438	90.6	
Two-party-preferred result
Labor	Christine Smith	12,062	51.8	+10.3
National	Judy Gamin	11,233	48.2	−10.3
Labor gain from National		Swing	+10.3	

=== Burnett ===
2001 Queensland state election: Burnett
Party	Candidate	Votes	%	±%
Labor	Trevor Strong	11,169	51.7	+25.0
National	Doug Slack	10,433	48.3	+16.1
Total formal votes		21,602	94.8	
Informal votes		1,179	5.2	
Turnout		22,781	93.3	
Labor gain from National		Swing	+11.0	

=== Cairns ===
2001 Queensland state election: Cairns
Party	Candidate	Votes	%	±%
Labor	Desley Boyle	11,170	51.5	+12.9
National	Naomi Wilson	4,819	22.2	+15.1
One Nation	Peter Gargan	4,394	20.3	−8.1
Greens	Alistair Hart	1,297	6.0	+2.5
Total formal votes		21,680	98.1	
Informal votes		419	1.9	
Turnout		22,099	88.8	
Two-party-preferred result
Labor	Desley Boyle	12,400	64.8	+11.3
National	Naomi Wilson	6,730	35.2	−11.3
Labor hold		Swing	+11.3	

=== Callide ===
2001 Queensland state election: Callide
Party	Candidate	Votes	%	±%
National	Jeff Seeney	9,598	40.1	+4.8
One Nation	Jim Dwyer	8,648	36.1	−3.7
Labor	Peter Allen	5,694	23.8	+5.1
Total formal votes		23,940	98.3	
Informal votes		424	1.7	
Turnout		24,364	93.9	
Two-candidate-preferred result
National	Jeff Seeney	10,265	52.3	+2.8
One Nation	Jim Dwyer	9,355	47.7	−2.8
National hold		Swing	+2.8	

=== Caloundra ===
2001 Queensland state election: Caloundra
Party	Candidate	Votes	%	±%
Liberal	Joan Sheldon	9,200	38.6	−3.2
Labor	Christine Anthony	8,658	36.3	+8.4
One Nation	Bruce Tannock	4,555	19.1	−4.9
Independent	Neil Wilkinson	1,430	6.0	+6.0
Total formal votes		23,843	98.3	
Informal votes		423	1.7	
Turnout		24,266	93.2	
Two-party-preferred result
Liberal	Joan Sheldon	10,637	51.0	−10.3
Labor	Christine Anthony	10,234	49.0	+10.3
Liberal hold		Swing	−10.3	

=== Capalaba ===
2001 Queensland state election: Capalaba
Party	Candidate	Votes	%	±%
Labor	Michael Choi	10,577	43.6	−10.6
Independent	Murray Elliott	3,835	15.8	+15.8
Independent	Toni Bowler	3,403	14.0	+14.0
Liberal	Phill Costello	3,051	12.6	−14.7
One Nation	Mike O'Rourke	2,958	12.2	+9.8
Independent	Mary Brown	272	1.1	+1.1
Independent	Les Reimers	158	0.7	+0.7
Total formal votes		24,254	97.5	
Informal votes		633	2.5	
Turnout		24,887	94.5	
Two-candidate-preferred result
Labor	Michael Choi	11,650	64.6	+1.0
Independent	Toni Bowler	6,379	35.4	+35.4
Labor hold		Swing	N/A	

=== Charters Towers ===
2001 Queensland state election: Charters Towers
Party	Candidate	Votes	%	±%
Labor	Christine Scott	7,575	43.8	+6.1
National	Rob Mitchell	5,984	34.6	−0.4
One Nation	Mark Ree	3,745	21.6	−3.8
Total formal votes		17,304	99.1	
Informal votes		165	0.9	
Turnout		17,469	93.7	
Two-party-preferred result
Labor	Christine Scott	8,138	52.2	+5.4
National	Rob Mitchell	7,460	47.8	−5.4
Labor gain from National		Swing	+5.4	

=== Chatsworth ===
2001 Queensland state election: Chatsworth
Party	Candidate	Votes	%	±%
Labor	Terry Mackenroth	14,530	56.9	+8.5
Liberal	Jo-Anne Leu	6,813	26.7	−3.6
One Nation	Gabriel Echaubard	2,813	11.0	−5.4
Greens	Rob Wilson	1,389	5.4	+0.8
Total formal votes		25,545	98.0	
Informal votes		532	2.0	
Turnout		26,077	94.6	
Two-party-preferred result
Labor	Terry Mackenroth	15,555	65.1	+8.2
Liberal	Jo-Anne Leu	8,322	34.9	−8.2
Labor hold		Swing	+8.2	

=== Clayfield ===
2001 Queensland state election: Clayfield
Party	Candidate	Votes	%	±%
Labor	Liddy Clark	10,839	45.9	+5.6
Liberal	Santo Santoro	9,948	42.2	−7.3
Independent	Robert Brittan	1,582	6.7	+6.7
Greens	Marit Hegge	1,228	5.2	+1.3
Total formal votes		23,597	98.4	
Informal votes		394	1.6	
Turnout		23,991	92.0	
Two-party-preferred result
Labor	Liddy Clark	11,593	52.0	+6.5
Liberal	Santo Santoro	10,708	48.0	−6.5
Labor gain from Liberal		Swing	+6.5	

=== Cleveland ===
2001 Queensland state election: Cleveland
Party	Candidate	Votes	%	±%
Labor	Darryl Briskey	13,529	57.6	+14.4
Liberal	Lynne Friis	5,880	25.0	−6.4
Independent	John Barton	4,099	17.4	+17.4
Total formal votes		23,508	97.5	
Informal votes		613	2.5	
Turnout		24,121	93.6	
Two-party-preferred result
Labor	Darryl Briskey	14,300	66.7	+10.9
Liberal	Lynne Friis	7,152	33.3	−10.9
Labor hold		Swing	+10.9	

=== Cook ===
2001 Queensland state election: Cook
Party	Candidate	Votes	%	±%
Labor	Steve Bredhauer	10,727	63.8	+10.4
One Nation	Alan Webb	3,465	20.6	+0.5
National	Lloyd Hollingsworth	2,610	15.5	−1.4
Total formal votes		16,802	98.3	
Informal votes		282	1.7	
Turnout		17,084	87.2	
Two-candidate-preferred result
Labor	Steve Bredhauer	11,175	72.9	+7.8
One Nation	Alan Webb	4,162	27.1	−7.8
Labor hold		Swing	+7.8	

=== Cunningham ===
2001 Queensland state election: Cunningham
Party	Candidate	Votes	%	±%
Labor	Leeann King	5,686	25.0	+5.7
National	Stuart Copeland	5,661	24.9	−19.1
One Nation	David Drinan	4,700	20.7	−10.5
Liberal	Peter Rookas	3,368	14.8	+14.8
Independent	Ann Collins	2,834	12.5	+12.5
City Country Alliance	John Reynolds	502	2.2	+2.2
Total formal votes		22,751	98.7	
Informal votes		301	1.3	
Turnout		23,052	93.5	
Two-party-preferred result
National	Stuart Copeland	9,769	58.6	−11.1
Labor	Leeann King	6,893	41.4	+41.4
National hold		Swing	−11.1	

=== Currumbin ===
2001 Queensland state election: Currumbin
Party	Candidate	Votes	%	±%
Labor	Merri Rose	13,801	56.4	+15.8
Liberal	Jann Stuckey	6,251	25.6	+11.3
One Nation	Maurice Horsburgh	3,823	15.6	−4.9
Independent	Helen Rossini	590	2.4	+2.4
Total formal votes		24,465	98.3	
Informal votes		421	1.7	
Turnout		24,886	91.2	
Two-party-preferred result
Labor	Merri Rose	14,581	64.5	+11.7
Liberal	Jann Stuckey	8,009	35.5	+35.5
Labor hold		Swing	+11.7	

=== Darling Downs ===
2001 Queensland state election: Darling Downs
Party	Candidate	Votes	%	±%
Independent	Ray Hopper	9,069	40.0	+40.0
National	Peter Taylor	8,855	39.1	−5.6
Labor	John Martin	4,749	20.9	+6.0
Total formal votes		22,673	98.3	
Informal votes		400	1.7	
Turnout		23,073	94.6	
Two-candidate-preferred result
Independent	Ray Hopper	9,651	51.1	+51.1
National	Peter Taylor	9,226	48.9	−6.4
Independent gain from National		Swing	+51.1	

=== Everton ===
2001 Queensland state election: Everton
Party	Candidate	Votes	%	±%
Labor	Rod Welford	15,719	62.8	+15.8
Liberal	John Dangerfield	6,990	27.9	−4.8
City Country Alliance	Lynette Edwards	2,302	9.2	+9.2
Total formal votes		25,011	98.0	
Informal votes		517	2.0	
Turnout		25,528	94.4	
Two-party-preferred result
Labor	Rod Welford	16,063	67.5	+11.8
Liberal	John Dangerfield	7,749	32.5	−11.8
Labor hold		Swing	+11.8	

=== Ferny Grove ===
2001 Queensland state election: Ferny Grove
Party	Candidate	Votes	%	±%
Labor	Geoff Wilson	16,466	63.3	+18.4
Liberal	Kel Eaton	6,756	26.0	−2.4
Greens	Mike Stasse	2,774	10.7	+6.6
Total formal votes		25,996	97.7	
Informal votes		599	2.3	
Turnout		26,595	94.6	
Two-party-preferred result
Labor	Geoff Wilson	17,488	70.5	+12.0
Liberal	Kel Eaton	7,302	29.5	−12.0
Labor hold		Swing	+12.0	

=== Fitzroy ===
2001 Queensland state election: Fitzroy
Party	Candidate	Votes	%	±%
Labor	Jim Pearce	13,599	62.8	+16.1
National	Rod Lawrie	6,187	28.6	+5.4
City Country Alliance	Di Schuback	1,879	8.7	+8.7
Total formal votes		21,665	98.4	
Informal votes		351	1.6	
Turnout		22,016	93.7	
Two-party-preferred result
Labor	Jim Pearce	13,915	67.2	+8.6
National	Rod Lawrie	6,797	32.8	−8.6
Labor hold		Swing	+8.6	

=== Gaven ===
2001 Queensland state election: Gaven
Party	Candidate	Votes	%	±%
Labor	Robert Poole	9,969	46.4	+15.0
National	Bill Baumann	7,178	33.4	+10.9
Independent	Phil Connolly	1,883	8.8	+8.8
Greens	Sally Spain	1,839	8.6	+3.0
Independent	David Cassidy	596	2.8	+2.8
Total formal votes		21,465	96.5	
Informal votes		767	3.5	
Turnout		22,232	91.3	
Two-party-preferred result
Labor	Robert Poole	10,776	57.6	+14.6
National	Bill Baumann	7,933	42.4	−14.6
Labor gain from National		Swing	+14.6	

=== Gladstone ===
2001 Queensland state election: Gladstone
Party	Candidate	Votes	%	±%
Independent	Liz Cunningham	12,336	50.7	+3.7
Labor	Jennifer Ellingsen	10,992	45.1	−2.3
National	Carl Hamann	571	2.3	−3.2
Greens	Rex Warren	450	1.8	+1.8
Total formal votes		24,349	98.8	
Informal votes		285	1.2	
Turnout		24,634	94.4	
Two-candidate-preferred result
Independent	Liz Cunningham	12,772	53.5	+2.1
Labor	Jennifer Ellingsen	11,103	46.5	−2.1
Independent hold		Swing	+2.1	

=== Glass House ===
2001 Queensland state election: Glass House
Party	Candidate	Votes	%	±%
Labor	Carolyn Male	9,989	40.8	+9.8
One Nation	Santo Ferraro	4,993	20.4	−9.6
National	Greg Chippendale	4,408	18.0	−4.6
Liberal	Debbie Taylor	2,612	10.7	+4.9
Greens	Dianne Cannon	1,628	6.6	+5.2
City Country Alliance	Martin Janke	867	3.5	+3.5
Total formal votes		24,497	98.2	
Informal votes		439	1.8	
Turnout		24,936	93.5	
Two-party-preferred result
Labor	Carolyn Male	11,598	59.6	+13.9
National	Greg Chippendale	7,869	40.4	−13.9
Labor gain from National		Swing	+13.9	

=== Greenslopes ===
2001 Queensland state election: Greenslopes
Party	Candidate	Votes	%	±%
Labor	Gary Fenlon	13,744	55.4	+6.7
Liberal	Andrew Edwards	7,639	30.8	−7.0
Greens	Sean Curley	2,491	10.0	+5.5
City Country Alliance	Greg Whitney	915	3.7	+3.7
Total formal votes		24,789	98.0	
Informal votes		498	2.0	
Turnout		25,287	92.6	
Two-party-preferred result
Labor	Gary Fenlon	14,791	64.1	+7.7
Liberal	Andrew Edwards	8,289	35.9	−7.7
Labor hold		Swing	+7.7	

=== Gregory ===
2001 Queensland state election: Gregory
Party	Candidate	Votes	%	±%
National	Vaughan Johnson	10,047	59.3	+16.0
Labor	Scott McDonell	6,897	40.7	+11.9
Total formal votes		16,944	97.3	
Informal votes		476	2.7	
Turnout		17,420	93.0	
National hold		Swing	−2.8	

=== Gympie ===
2001 Queensland state election: Gympie
Party	Candidate	Votes	%	±%
Labor	Rae Gate	8,563	33.4	+7.4
One Nation	Elisa Roberts	6,587	25.7	−11.7
National	Stephen Duff	6,330	24.7	−3.7
City Country Alliance	Ian Petersen	4,139	16.2	+16.2
Total formal votes		25,619	98.5	
Informal votes		399	1.5	
Turnout		26,018	93.7	
Two-candidate-preferred result
One Nation	Elisa Roberts	11,130	53.3	+6.8
Labor	Rae Gate	9,766	46.7	+46.7
One Nation gain from National		Swing	+6.8	

=== Hervey Bay ===
2001 Queensland state election: Hervey Bay
Party	Candidate	Votes	%	±%
Labor	Andrew McNamara	9,707	42.7	+5.8
City Country Alliance	David Dalgleish	4,193	18.5	+18.5
One Nation	Wes Robinson	4,186	18.4	−13.3
National	Randal McLellan	3,915	17.2	−11.8
Independent	Wes Donnelly	723	3.2	+3.2
Total formal votes		22,724	98.4	
Informal votes		379	1.6	
Turnout		23,103	93.9	
Two-candidate-preferred result
Labor	Andrew McNamara	10,559	57.6	+11.8
One Nation	Wes Robinson	7,762	42.4	−11.8
Labor gain from One Nation		Swing	+11.8	

=== Hinchinbrook ===
2001 Queensland state election: Hinchinbrook
Party	Candidate	Votes	%	±%
National	Marc Rowell	5,862	28.8	−5.7
One Nation	Robert Ralph	5,362	26.4	−5.1
Labor	Mick Small	5,313	26.1	−0.7
Independent	Andrew Lancini	3,534	17.4	+17.4
City Country Alliance	Elaine Steley	270	1.3	+1.3
Total formal votes		20,341	98.2	
Informal votes		362	1.8	
Turnout		20,703	93.1	
Two-candidate-preferred result
National	Marc Rowell	7,192	52.8	−3.9
One Nation	Robert Ralph	6,436	47.2	+3.9
National hold		Swing	−3.9	

=== Inala ===
2001 Queensland state election: Inala
Party	Candidate	Votes	%	±%
Labor	Henry Palaszczuk	14,434	68.1	+2.3
Independent	George Pugh	4,585	21.6	+21.6
Liberal	Marie Jackson	2,180	10.3	−7.1
Total formal votes		21,199	97.5	
Informal votes		551	2.5	
Turnout		21,750	93.5	
Two-candidate-preferred result
Labor	Henry Palaszczuk	14,606	71.5	−5.0
Independent	George Pugh	5,836	28.5	+28.5
Labor hold		Swing	−5.0	

=== Indooroopilly ===
2001 Queensland state election: Indooroopilly
Party	Candidate	Votes	%	±%
Labor	Ronan Lee	9,028	38.7	+0.8
Liberal	Denver Beanland	8,686	37.2	−7.6
Greens	Drew Hutton	2,351	10.1	+0.4
Independent	Geoffrey Sakzewski	997	4.3	+4.3
Democrats	Mary McIntyre	944	4.0	−3.6
One Nation	John Drew	879	3.8	+3.8
Independent	Nigel Freemarijuana	434	1.9	+1.9
Total formal votes		23,319	98.9	
Informal votes		260	1.1	
Turnout		23,579	90.3	
Two-party-preferred result
Labor	Ronan Lee	11,245	52.9	+3.3
Liberal	Denver Beanland	10,022	47.1	−3.3
Labor gain from Liberal		Swing	+3.3	

=== Ipswich ===
2001 Queensland state election: Ipswich
Party	Candidate	Votes	%	±%
Labor	Rachel Nolan	12,282	49.8	+4.2
One Nation	Rita Magnussen	5,237	21.2	−17.9
Liberal	Maria Forbes	2,641	10.7	+1.6
Independent	Trevor Nardi	2,200	8.9	+8.9
Independent	Noel Jaenke	1,303	5.3	+5.3
Greens	Desiree Mahoney	642	2.6	−0.2
City Country Alliance	Mike Atkin	243	1.0	+1.0
Independent	Don Cameron	107	0.4	+0.4
Total formal votes		24,655	98.4	
Informal votes		410	1.6	
Turnout		25,065	94.3	
Two-candidate-preferred result
Labor	Rachel Nolan	14,029	66.8	+13.8
One Nation	Rita Magnussen	6,985	33.2	−13.8
Labor hold		Swing	+13.8	

=== Ipswich West ===
2001 Queensland state election: Ipswich West
Party	Candidate	Votes	%	±%
Labor	Don Livingstone	10,768	45.9	+7.0
One Nation	Bob Dutton	6,002	25.6	−14.2
National	David Pahlke	4,469	19.1	+0.4
City Country Alliance	Jack Paff	1,200	5.1	+5.1
Greens	Ben Glass	1,016	4.3	+3.6
Total formal votes		23,455	98.4	
Informal votes		390	1.6	
Turnout		23,845	94.7	
Two-candidate-preferred result
Labor	Don Livingstone	11,645	57.3	+11.5
One Nation	Bob Dutton	8,679	42.7	−11.5
Labor gain from One Nation		Swing	+11.5	

=== Kallangur ===
2001 Queensland state election: Kallangur
Party	Candidate	Votes	%	±%
Labor	Ken Hayward	13,312	58.3	+15.6
Liberal	Scott Driscoll	4,366	19.1	−2.9
Independent	Neville Jones	1,750	7.7	+7.7
City Country Alliance	Ray Eldridge	1,740	7.6	+7.6
Greens	Suzi Tooke	1,656	7.3	+4.4
Total formal votes		22,824	97.3	
Informal votes		642	2.7	
Turnout		23,466	93.7	
Two-party-preferred result
Labor	Ken Hayward	14,165	71.4	+14.8
Liberal	Scott Driscoll	5,681	28.6	−14.8
Labor hold		Swing	+14.8	

=== Kawana ===
2001 Queensland state election: Kawana
Party	Candidate	Votes	%	±%
Labor	Chris Cummins	10,446	42.5	+18.1
Liberal	Bruce Laming	9,438	38.4	−8.5
One Nation	Kevin Savage	4,708	19.1	−3.6
Total formal votes		24,592	98.0	
Informal votes		496	2.0	
Turnout		25,088	93.1	
Two-party-preferred result
Labor	Chris Cummins	11,801	52.6	+18.7
Liberal	Bruce Laming	10,625	47.4	−18.7
Labor gain from Liberal		Swing	+18.7	

=== Keppel ===
2001 Queensland state election: Keppel
Party	Candidate	Votes	%	±%
National	Vince Lester	9,285	43.0	+11.6
Labor	Paul Hoolihan	9,285	43.0	+12.9
City Country Alliance	Glenda Mather	3,030	14.0	+14.0
Total formal votes		21,596	98.2	
Informal votes		404	1.8	
Turnout		22,000	93.0	
Two-party-preferred result
National	Vince Lester	10,198	51.5	−2.7
Labor	Paul Hoolihan	9,620	48.5	+2.7
National hold		Swing	−2.7	

=== Kurwongbah ===
2001 Queensland state election: Kurwongbah
Party	Candidate	Votes	%	±%
Labor	Linda Lavarch	16,889	62.9	+13.6
Liberal	Brenda Martin	5,757	21.5	−1.2
Greens	Kim Pantano	1,762	6.6	+0.9
Democrats	Matt Harrison	1,460	5.4	+5.4
City Country Alliance	Steve Purtill	963	3.6	+3.6
Total formal votes		26,831	97.6	
Informal votes		663	2.4	
Turnout		27,494	94.3	
Two-party-preferred result
Labor	Linda Lavarch	17,987	72.7	+9.7
Liberal	Brenda Martin	6,755	27.3	−9.7
Labor hold		Swing	+9.7	

=== Lockyer ===
2001 Queensland state election: Lockyer
Party	Candidate	Votes	%	±%
One Nation	Bill Flynn	6,608	28.3	−9.0
Labor	Virginia Clarke	6,428	27.5	+4.7
City Country Alliance	Peter Prenzler	4,197	18.0	+18.0
National	Lindsay Christensen	3,947	16.9	−7.4
Independent	Ken Murray	1,170	5.0	+5.0
Greens	Jo Nemeth	665	2.8	+2.6
Independent	Angela Micallef	325	1.4	+1.4
Total formal votes		23,340	98.2	
Informal votes		434	1.8	
Turnout		23,774	94.4	
Two-candidate-preferred result
One Nation	Bill Flynn	10,108	57.3	+4.2
Labor	Virginia Clarke	7,533	42.7	+42.7
One Nation hold		Swing	+4.2	

=== Logan ===
2001 Queensland state election: Logan
Party	Candidate	Votes	%	±%
Labor	John Mickel	15,645	72.3	+25.6
National	Joy Drescher	6,001	27.7	+10.2
Total formal votes		21,646	94.4	
Informal votes		1,275	5.6	
Turnout		22,921	92.6	
Labor hold		Swing	+10.4	

=== Lytton ===
2001 Queensland state election: Lytton
Party	Candidate	Votes	%	±%
Labor	Paul Lucas	16,305	66.9	+8.0
Liberal	Vincent Ladner	5,329	21.9	−5.4
Greens	Fay Smith	2,736	11.2	+5.7
Total formal votes		24,370	97.2	
Informal votes		697	2.8	
Turnout		25,067	94.7	
Two-party-preferred result
Labor	Paul Lucas	17,150	74.4	+7.4
Liberal	Vincent Ladner	5,902	25.6	−7.4
Labor hold		Swing	+7.4	

=== Mackay ===
2001 Queensland state election: Mackay
Party	Candidate	Votes	%	±%
Labor	Tim Mulherin	14,235	58.7	+10.7
National	Martin Bella	7,594	31.3	+8.0
City Country Alliance	Barry Townsend	2,433	10.0	+10.0
Total formal votes		24,262	97.7	
Informal votes		580	2.3	
Turnout		24,842	91.8	
Two-party-preferred result
Labor	Tim Mulherin	14,494	63.5	+4.3
National	Martin Bella	8,323	36.5	−4.3
Labor hold		Swing	+4.3	

=== Mansfield ===
2001 Queensland state election: Mansfield
Party	Candidate	Votes	%	±%
Labor	Phil Reeves	13,296	53.4	+12.5
Liberal	Frank Carroll	8,646	34.7	−3.0
Independent	Richard Leworthy	2,960	11.9	+11.9
Total formal votes		24,902	98.2	
Informal votes		463	1.8	
Turnout		25,365	93.9	
Two-party-preferred result
Labor	Phil Reeves	13,806	58.6	+7.9
Liberal	Frank Carroll	9,746	41.4	−7.9
Labor hold		Swing	+7.9	

=== Maroochydore ===
2001 Queensland state election: Maroochydore
Party	Candidate	Votes	%	±%
Labor	Malcolm Baillie	9,762	41.1	+15.1
National	Fiona Simpson	9,446	39.8	+7.8
One Nation	Rowena Wellard	4,530	19.1	−6.3
Total formal votes		23,738	98.0	
Informal votes		492	2.0	
Turnout		24,230	90.0	
Two-party-preferred result
National	Fiona Simpson	10,650	50.8	−10.8
Labor	Malcolm Baillie	10,318	49.2	+10.8
National hold		Swing	−10.8	

=== Maryborough ===
2001 Queensland state election: Maryborough
Party	Candidate	Votes	%	±%
Labor	Alan Holmes	10,081	42.0	+6.6
Independent	John Kingston	8,034	33.5	+33.5
National	Linda Harris	3,492	14.6	−4.2
City Country Alliance	Debbie Douglas	1,844	7.7	+7.7
Independent	Ray Smith	545	2.3	+2.3
Total formal votes		23,996	97.6	
Informal votes		582	2.4	
Turnout		24,578	95.1	
Two-candidate-preferred result
Independent	John Kingston	10,678	50.5	+50.5
Labor	Alan Holmes	10,466	49.5	+8.0
Independent gain from One Nation		Swing	+50.5	

=== Mirani ===
2001 Queensland state election: Mirani
Party	Candidate	Votes	%	±%
National	Ted Malone	7,672	34.9	+0.7
Labor	Richard Staker	7,296	33.2	−1.2
One Nation	Rob Robinson	4,729	21.5	−7.5
Independent	Barry Gomersall	1,546	7.0	+7.0
Independent	Ed Vaughan	729	3.3	+3.3
Total formal votes		21,972	98.6	
Informal votes		303	1.4	
Turnout		22,275	94.3	
Two-party-preferred result
National	Ted Malone	9,366	53.8	−0.2
Labor	Richard Staker	8,042	46.2	+0.2
National hold		Swing	−0.2	

=== Moggill ===
2001 Queensland state election: Moggill
Party	Candidate	Votes	%	±%
Liberal	David Watson	9,872	40.4	−12.9
Labor	Laurie Lumsden	9,408	38.5	+4.7
Independent	Barry Searle	2,263	9.3	+9.3
Greens	Lenore Taylor	1,566	6.4	+0.1
Democrats	John Yesberg	1,355	5.5	−1.2
Total formal votes		24,464	98.5	
Informal votes		373	1.5	
Turnout		24,837	92.9	
Two-party-preferred result
Liberal	David Watson	11,404	50.9	−8.0
Labor	Laurie Lumsden	11,008	49.1	+8.0
Liberal hold		Swing	−8.0	

=== Mount Coot-tha ===
2001 Queensland state election: Mount Coot-tha
Party	Candidate	Votes	%	±%
Labor	Wendy Edmond	11,741	51.0	+1.4
Liberal	Jenny Cannon	6,135	26.6	−7.7
Greens	Dick Copeman	2,740	11.9	+2.0
Independent	Anne Boccabella	1,424	6.2	+6.2
Democrats	Adam Zaborszczyk	985	4.3	−1.3
Total formal votes		23,025	98.5	
Informal votes		348	1.5	
Turnout		23,373	88.7	
Two-party-preferred result
Labor	Wendy Edmond	13,888	66.1	+5.1
Liberal	Jenny Cannon	7,116	33.9	−5.1
Labor hold		Swing	+5.1	

=== Mount Gravatt ===
2001 Queensland state election: Mount Gravatt
Party	Candidate	Votes	%	±%
Labor	Judy Spence	13,187	54.6	+8.1
Liberal	Steven Huang	6,509	27.0	−6.1
One Nation	Edmund McMahon	2,248	9.3	−5.2
Greens	Daniel Lloyd	1,141	4.7	+0.7
Independent	Frank Tanti	831	3.4	+3.4
Independent	Ken Eggmolesse	235	1.0	+1.0
Total formal votes		24,151	98.0	
Informal votes		490	2.0	
Turnout		24,641	93.8	
Two-party-preferred result
Labor	Judy Spence	14,220	64.2	+8.1
Liberal	Steve Huang	7,940	35.8	−8.1
Labor hold		Swing	+8.1	

=== Mount Isa ===
2001 Queensland state election: Mount Isa
Party	Candidate	Votes	%	±%
Labor	Tony McGrady	8,981	57.6	+3.1
One Nation	Larry Braden	3,384	21.7	−3.0
National	Annie Clarke	3,220	20.7	+2.5
Total formal votes		15,585	98.6	
Informal votes		216	1.4	
Turnout		15,801	88.7	
Two-candidate-preferred result
Labor	Tony McGrady	9,593	66.2	+3.2
One Nation	Larry Braden	4,892	33.8	−3.2
Labor hold		Swing	+3.2	

=== Mount Ommaney ===
2001 Queensland state election: Mount Ommaney
Party	Candidate	Votes	%	±%
Labor	Julie Attwood	12,483	52.0	+13.1
Independent	Angelo Bertoni	5,657	23.6	+23.6
Liberal	Bob Harper	4,731	19.7	−16.0
Greens	Willy Bach	1,141	4.8	+1.4
Total formal votes		24,012	98.7	
Informal votes		322	1.3	
Turnout		24,334	92.8	
Two-candidate-preferred result
Labor	Julie Attwood	13,273	58.7	+7.2
Independent	Angelo Bertoni	9,323	41.3	+41.3
Labor hold		Swing	+7.2	

=== Mudgeeraba ===
2001 Queensland state election: Mudgeeraba
Party	Candidate	Votes	%	±%
Labor	Dianne Reilly	9,371	41.3	+14.0
Liberal	Ray Connor	6,952	30.6	−8.8
Independent	Matt Keys	3,596	15.9	+15.9
Greens	Inge Light	2,025	8.9	+3.3
Independent	Dorothy Lyons	408	1.8	+1.8
Independent	Ronald Bradley	330	1.5	+1.5
Total formal votes		22,682	96.8	
Informal votes		750	3.2	
Turnout		23,432	91.1	
Two-party-preferred result
Labor	Dianne Reilly	10,585	56.8	+18.4
Liberal	Ray Connor	8,060	43.2	−18.4
Labor gain from Liberal		Swing	+18.4	

=== Mulgrave ===
2001 Queensland state election: Mulgrave
Party	Candidate	Votes	%	±%
Labor	Warren Pitt	11,903	53.6	+15.1
One Nation	Dominic Frisone	5,847	26.3	−3.7
National	Barry Moyle	4,443	20.0	−9.3
Total formal votes		22,193	98.3	
Informal votes		383	1.7	
Turnout		22,576	92.1	
Two-candidate-preferred result
Labor	Warren Pitt	12,512	61.3	+14.0
One Nation	Dominic Frisone	7,903	38.7	−14.0
Labor hold		Swing	+14.0	

=== Mundingburra ===
2001 Queensland state election: Mundingburra
Party	Candidate	Votes	%	±%
Labor	Lindy Nelson-Carr	11,640	48.9	+6.6
Liberal	David Moore	6,780	28.5	+4.5
One Nation	Trevor Elson	4,056	17.0	−8.2
Greens	Rebecca Smith	904	3.8	+3.8
City Country Alliance	Michael Staines	439	1.8	+1.8
Total formal votes		23,819	98.0	
Informal votes		484	2.0	
Turnout		24,303	91.5	
Two-party-preferred result
Labor	Lindy Nelson-Carr	12,598	61.4	+9.0
Liberal	David Moore	7,928	38.6	−9.0
Labor hold		Swing	+9.0	

=== Murrumba ===
2001 Queensland state election: Murrumba
Party	Candidate	Votes	%	±%
Labor	Dean Wells	14,839	62.5	+17.2
Liberal	Susan Haskell	4,498	18.9	−2.7
Independent	Rob McJannett	4,408	18.6	+18.6
Total formal votes		23,745	97.4	
Informal votes		635	2.6	
Turnout		24,380	94.2	
Two-party-preferred result
Labor	Dean Wells	15,500	71.1	+12.5
Liberal	Susan Haskell	6,295	28.9	+28.9
Labor hold		Swing	+12.5	

=== Nanango ===
2001 Queensland state election: Nanango
Party	Candidate	Votes	%	±%
Independent	Dorothy Pratt	9,680	46.2	+46.2
Labor	Alan Weir	5,882	28.1	+9.7
National	Keith Campbell	5,400	25.8	−4.8
Total formal votes		20,962	97.9	
Informal votes		451	2.1	
Turnout		21,413	94.3	
Two-candidate-preferred result
Independent	Dorothy Pratt	12,796	67.1	+67.1
Labor	Alan Weir	6,282	32.9	+32.9
Independent gain from One Nation		Swing	+67.1	

=== Nicklin ===
2001 Queensland state election: Nicklin
Party	Candidate	Votes	%	±%
Independent	Peter Wellington	11,554	46.3	+22.3
Labor	Philomena Boman	4,224	16.9	−1.9
One Nation	Clinton Booth	3,992	16.0	−7.6
Liberal	Dot Whittington	2,305	9.2	+6.9
National	Warren Gardiner	1,941	7.8	−18.7
Greens	John Fitzgerald	932	3.7	+1.4
Total formal votes		24,948	98.8	
Informal votes		304	1.2	
Turnout		25,252	92.7	
Two-candidate-preferred result
Independent	Peter Wellington	15,114	73.4	+14.9
One Nation	Clinton Booth	5,469	26.6	+26.6
Independent hold		Swing	+14.9	

=== Noosa ===
2001 Queensland state election: Noosa
Party	Candidate	Votes	%	±%
Labor	Cate Molloy	10,828	42.0	+12.3
Liberal	Bruce Davidson	10,391	40.3	−5.5
One Nation	Ernie Lake	4,543	17.6	+3.9
Total formal votes		25,762	98.1	
Informal votes		486	1.9	
Turnout		26,248	91.3	
Two-party-preferred result
Labor	Cate Molloy	11,977	50.9	+11.3
Liberal	Bruce Davidson	11,552	49.1	−11.3
Labor gain from Liberal		Swing	+11.3	

=== Nudgee ===
2001 Queensland state election: Nudgee
Party	Candidate	Votes	%	±%
Labor	Neil Roberts	18,252	75.1	+19.9
Liberal	Scott Taylor	6,042	24.9	+1.6
Total formal votes		24,294	96.5	
Informal votes		882	3.5	
Turnout		25,176	93.7	
Labor hold		Swing	+8.7	

=== Pumicestone ===
2001 Queensland state election: Pumicestone
Party	Candidate	Votes	%	±%
Labor	Carryn Sullivan	11,360	46.3	+5.9
Liberal	Gary Parsons	4,380	17.8	+12.7
One Nation	Wayne Whitney	3,953	16.1	−12.9
City Country Alliance	Bill Feldman	3,805	15.5	+15.5
Greens	Les Shotton	610	2.5	+1.8
Independent	Dennis Rounsefell	453	1.8	+1.8
Total formal votes		24,561	98.2	
Informal votes		439	1.8	
Turnout		25,000	93.8	
Two-party-preferred result
Labor	Carryn Sullivan	12,686	66.1	+16.9
Liberal	Gary Parsons	6,505	33.9	+33.9
Labor gain from One Nation		Swing	+16.9	

=== Redcliffe ===
2001 Queensland state election: Redcliffe
Party	Candidate	Votes	%	±%
Labor	Ray Hollis	13,989	56.6	+13.0
Liberal	Peter Rankin	5,789	23.4	−5.5
Independent	Rae Frawley	3,232	13.1	+13.1
City Country Alliance	Peter Salisbury	866	3.5	+3.5
Independent	Robert White	604	2.4	+2.4
Independent	Len Matthews	255	1.0	+1.0
Total formal votes		24,735	97.6	
Informal votes		606	2.4	
Turnout		25,341	92.9	
Two-party-preferred result
Labor	Ray Hollis	14,633	67.6	+13.7
Liberal	Peter Rankin	7,011	32.4	−13.7
Labor hold		Swing	+13.7	

=== Redlands ===
2001 Queensland state election: Redlands
Party	Candidate	Votes	%	±%
Labor	John English	10,797	48.6	+9.8
National	John Hegarty	6,500	29.2	−2.1
Independent	John Burns	3,210	14.4	+14.4
City Country Alliance	Susan Hancock	1,731	7.8	+7.8
Total formal votes		22,238	97.3	
Informal votes		611	2.7	
Turnout		22,849	94.3	
Two-party-preferred result
Labor	John English	11,494	56.9	+7.5
National	John Hegarty	8,721	43.1	−7.5
Labor gain from National		Swing	+7.5	

=== Robina ===
2001 Queensland state election: Robina
Party	Candidate	Votes	%	±%
Liberal	Bob Quinn	12,822	54.0	+9.2
Labor	Bruce Simmonds	10,909	46.0	+18.9
Total formal votes		23,731	95.3	
Informal votes		1,171	4.7	
Turnout		24,902	90.1	
Liberal hold		Swing	−12.2	

=== Rockhampton ===
2001 Queensland state election: Rockhampton
Party	Candidate	Votes	%	±%
Labor	Robert Schwarten	15,926	69.1	+20.5
National	Ron Bahnisch	5,053	21.9	+1.0
City Country Alliance	Peter Schuback	2,056	8.9	+8.9
Total formal votes		23,035	97.5	
Informal votes		592	2.5	
Turnout		23,627	93.4	
Two-party-preferred result
Labor	Robert Schwarten	16,166	74.2	+13.1
National	Ron Bahnisch	5,626	25.8	+25.8
Labor hold		Swing	+13.1	

=== Sandgate ===
2001 Queensland state election: Sandgate
Party	Candidate	Votes	%	±%
Labor	Gordon Nuttall	16,242	66.8	+17.4
Liberal	Don Young	4,890	20.1	-0.0
Independent	Ron Eaton	3,179	13.1	+13.1
Total formal votes		24,311	97.7	
Informal votes		565	2.3	
Turnout		24,876	94.1	
Two-party-preferred result
Labor	Gordon Nuttall	16,774	74.5	+8.5
Liberal	Don Young	5,750	25.5	−8.5
Labor hold		Swing	+8.5	

=== South Brisbane ===
2001 Queensland state election: South Brisbane
Party	Candidate	Votes	%	±%
Labor	Anna Bligh	14,329	59.9	+6.7
Liberal	Jason Chappel	4,720	19.7	−7.1
Greens	Mark Taylor	2,150	9.0	+8.3
Democrats	Crystal Lagos	985	4.1	−0.5
Independent	Murray Swan	777	3.2	+1.5
Independent	Guy Freemarijuana	653	2.7	+0.3
Independent	Adam Baker	310	1.3	+1.3
Total formal votes		23,924	97.4	
Informal votes		638	2.6	
Turnout		24,562	88.6	
Two-party-preferred result
Labor	Anna Bligh	16,377	74.9	+9.2
Liberal	Jason Chappel	5,479	25.1	−9.2
Labor hold		Swing	+9.2	

=== Southern Downs ===
2001 Queensland state election: Southern Downs
Party	Candidate	Votes	%	±%
National	Lawrence Springborg	13,092	51.6	+6.5
Labor	Stella Rey	6,459	25.5	+6.4
Independent	Joan White	5,818	22.9	+22.9
Total formal votes		25,369	98.2	
Informal votes		451	1.8	
Turnout		25,820	93.7	
Two-party-preferred result
National	Lawrence Springborg	14,627	66.8	−3.0
Labor	Stella Rey	7,278	33.2	+3.0
National hold		Swing	−3.0	

=== Southport ===
2001 Queensland state election: Southport
Party	Candidate	Votes	%	±%
Labor	Peter Lawlor	11,245	50.9	+14.1
National	Mick Veivers	6,434	29.1	−8.8
One Nation	Lesley Millar	3,351	15.2	−6.5
Independent	Aaron Cortenbach	1,083	4.9	+4.9
Total formal votes		22,113	97.6	
Informal votes		551	2.4	
Turnout		22,664	90.2	
Two-party-preferred result
Labor	Peter Lawlor	11,986	60.8	+13.9
National	Mick Veivers	7,714	39.2	−13.9
Labor gain from National		Swing	+13.9	

=== Springwood ===
2001 Queensland state election: Springwood
Party	Candidate	Votes	%	±%
Labor	Barbara Stone	11,192	45.6	+7.4
Independent	Hetty Johnston	5,140	20.9	+20.9
National	Darren Power	4,613	18.8	+8.4
Liberal	Bob Ward	3,590	14.6	−9.5
Total formal votes		24,535	97.5	
Informal votes		624	2.5	
Turnout		25,159	92.7	
Two-party-preferred result
Labor	Barbara Stone	12,442	60.4	+10.7
National	Darren Power	8,169	39.6	+39.6
Labor gain from Liberal		Swing	+10.7	

=== Stafford ===
2001 Queensland state election: Stafford
Party	Candidate	Votes	%	±%
Labor	Terry Sullivan	16,190	65.4	+13.8
Liberal	Zenia Belcher	5,982	24.2	−2.8
Greens	Sue Meehan	2,590	10.5	+10.5
Total formal votes		24,762	97.7	
Informal votes		591	2.3	
Turnout		25,353	93.3	
Two-party-preferred result
Labor	Terry Sullivan	17,052	72.4	+10.1
Liberal	Zenia Belcher	6,503	27.6	−10.1
Labor hold		Swing	+10.1	

=== Stretton ===
2001 Queensland state election: Stretton
Party	Candidate	Votes	%	±%
Labor	Stephen Robertson	14,778	62.7	+15.5
Liberal	David Lin	8,805	37.3	+6.3
Total formal votes		23,583	96.3	
Informal votes		894	3.7	
Turnout		24,477	92.0	
Labor hold		Swing	+4.8	

=== Surfers Paradise ===
2001 Queensland state election: Surfers Paradise
Party	Candidate	Votes	%	±%
National	Rob Borbidge	12,033	49.7	−2.6
Labor	Richard Alcorn	9,259	38.3	+13.9
Greens	Dean Hepburn	2,899	12.0	+8.3
Total formal votes		24,191	96.9	
Informal votes		784	3.1	
Turnout		24,975	88.2	
Two-party-preferred result
National	Rob Borbidge	12,546	55.3	−13.6
Labor	Richard Alcorn	10,147	44.7	+13.6
National hold		Swing	−13.6	

=== Tablelands ===
2001 Queensland state election: Tablelands
Party	Candidate	Votes	%	±%
One Nation	Rosa Lee Long	7,722	36.0	−6.0
Labor	Arthur Yates	5,325	24.8	−0.2
National	Joe Moro	3,522	16.4	−16.6
Independent	Shaun Nelson	3,284	15.3	+15.3
Independent	Henry Condon	1,098	5.1	+5.1
Independent	Alan Isherwood	507	2.4	+2.4
Total formal votes		21,458	98.6	
Informal votes		313	1.4	
Turnout		21,771	92.9	
Two-candidate-preferred result
One Nation	Rosa Lee Long	10,994	63.8	+13.6
Labor	Arthur Yates	6,235	36.2	+36.2
One Nation hold		Swing	+13.6	

=== Thuringowa ===
2001 Queensland state election: Thuringowa
Party	Candidate	Votes	%	±%
Labor	Anita Phillips	9,952	41.0	+4.9
Independent	Ken Turner	6,258	25.8	+25.8
National	Neil Weekes	4,532	18.7	+9.6
Liberal	Marnie Nelson	2,447	10.1	−7.6
City Country Alliance	Adam Morton	762	3.1	+3.1
Independent	Wolfe Lindner	311	1.3	+1.3
Total formal votes		24,262	97.5	
Informal votes		633	2.5	
Turnout		24,895	93.0	
Two-candidate-preferred result
Labor	Anita Phillips	11,052	53.6	+9.2
Independent	Ken Turner	9,581	46.4	+46.4
Labor gain from One Nation		Swing	+9.2	

=== Toowoomba North ===
2001 Queensland state election: Toowoomba North
Party	Candidate	Votes	%	±%
Labor	Kerry Shine	9,772	44.1	+11.9
National	Graham Healy	8,795	39.7	−0.8
City Country Alliance	Frank Francis	1,529	6.9	+6.9
Independent	Rob Berry	1,215	5.5	+5.5
Independent	Grahame Mogg	846	3.8	+3.8
Total formal votes		22,157	97.7	
Informal votes		527	2.3	
Turnout		22,684	93.2	
Two-party-preferred result
Labor	Kerry Shine	10,503	51.9	+11.9
National	Graham Healy	9,747	48.1	−11.9
Labor gain from National		Swing	+11.9	

=== Toowoomba South ===
2001 Queensland state election: Toowoomba South
Party	Candidate	Votes	%	±%
National	Mike Horan	10,028	43.8	−2.4
Labor	Peter Shooter	7,439	32.5	+5.1
One Nation	David Hoy	4,577	20.0	−4.3
Independent	Hugh Wilson	857	3.7	+3.7
Total formal votes		22,901	98.4	
Informal votes		374	1.6	
Turnout		23,275	92.5	
Two-party-preferred result
National	Mike Horan	11,319	57.9	−5.8
Labor	Peter Shooter	8,216	42.1	+5.8
National hold		Swing	−5.8	

=== Townsville ===
2001 Queensland state election: Townsville
Party	Candidate	Votes	%	±%
Labor	Mike Reynolds	11,494	52.0	+6.7
Liberal	Fay Barker	7,848	35.5	+7.8
Independent	Wendy Tubman	1,833	8.3	+8.3
Independent	Billy Tait	942	4.3	+2.5
Total formal votes		22,117	96.8	
Informal votes		725	3.2	
Turnout		22,842	89.5	
Two-party-preferred result
Labor	Mike Reynolds	12,319	59.3	+1.8
Liberal	Fay Barker	8,443	40.7	−1.8
Labor hold		Swing	+1.8	

=== Warrego ===
2001 Queensland state election: Warrego
Party	Candidate	Votes	%	±%
National	Howard Hobbs	6,737	33.8	−13.3
Independent	Wally Gleeson	5,193	26.1	+26.1
One Nation	Robert Burton	4,733	23.8	−4.3
Labor	Anthony Chisholm	3,243	16.3	−4.6
Total formal votes		19,906	98.8	
Informal votes		239	1.2	
Turnout		20,145	93.3	
Two-candidate-preferred result
National	Howard Hobbs	7,943	50.3	−13.1
Independent	Wally Gleeson	7,847	49.7	+49.7
National hold		Swing	−13.1	

=== Waterford ===
2001 Queensland state election: Waterford
Party	Candidate	Votes	%	±%
Labor	Tom Barton	12,378	56.2	+9.3
One Nation	June Woodward	5,465	24.8	−3.8
Liberal	Richard Somers	3,267	14.8	−8.6
Independent	David Howse	910	4.1	+4.1
Total formal votes		22,020	97.2	
Informal votes		625	2.8	
Turnout		22,645	91.3	
Two-candidate-preferred result
Labor	Tom Barton	13,755	68.0	+11.4
One Nation	June Woodward	6,470	32.0	−11.4
Labor hold		Swing	+11.4	

=== Whitsunday ===
2001 Queensland state election: Whitsunday
Party	Candidate	Votes	%	±%
Labor	Jan Jarratt	10,026	46.3	+8.4
National	Dave Perkins	5,237	24.2	−6.8
City Country Alliance	Harry Black	2,919	13.5	+13.5
One Nation	David Haselgrove	2,677	12.4	−18.7
Independent	Ken Smyth	799	3.7	+3.7
Total formal votes		21,658	98.5	
Informal votes		334	1.5	
Turnout		21,992	91.6	
Two-party-preferred result
Labor	Jan Jarratt	10,751	59.6	+12.8
National	Dave Perkins	7,294	40.4	+40.4
Labor gain from One Nation		Swing	+12.8	

=== Woodridge ===
2001 Queensland state election: Woodridge
Party	Candidate	Votes	%	±%
Labor	Desley Scott	11,992	57.3	+5.5
One Nation	Alice Ngahooro	4,336	20.7	−8.3
Independent	John Grant	2,273	10.9	+10.9
Liberal	Jane Simon	1,272	6.1	−2.0
Independent	Jody Moore	1,057	5.1	+5.1
Total formal votes		20,930	97.3	
Informal votes		579	2.7	
Turnout		21,509	91.1	
Two-candidate-preferred result
Labor	Desley Scott	13,138	71.1	+9.1
One Nation	Alice Ngahooro	5,346	28.9	−9.1
Labor hold		Swing	+9.1	

=== Yeerongpilly ===
2001 Queensland state election: Yeerongpilly
Party	Candidate	Votes	%	±%
Labor	Matt Foley	15,135	61.8	+8.8
Liberal	Russell Miles	5,215	21.3	−4.7
Greens	Stephen Burchall	1,877	7.7	+2.9
Independent	Michael Bond	1,516	6.2	+6.2
Independent	Darryl Wheeley	731	3.0	+3.0
Total formal votes		24,474	97.8	
Informal votes		545	2.2	
Turnout		25,019	92.2	
Two-party-preferred result
Labor	Matt Foley	16,210	72.2	+8.7
Liberal	Russell Miles	6,249	27.8	−8.7
Labor hold		Swing	+8.7	

== See also ==
- 2001 Queensland state election
- Candidates of the Queensland state election, 2001
- Members of the Queensland Legislative Assembly, 2001-2004
