= Candidates of the 2001 Queensland state election =

The 2001 Queensland state election was held on 17 February 2001.

== Redistribution ==
A redistribution of electoral boundaries occurred in 1999.

The electorates of Archerfield, Barambah, Caboolture, Chermside, Crows Nest, Kedron, Merrimac, Mooloolah, Nerang, Sunnybank, Warwick, Western Downs, and Yeronga were abolished.

The electorates of Algester, Darling Downs, Gaven, Glass House, Kawana, Mudgeeraba, Nanango, Pumicestone, Robina, Southern Downs, Stafford, Stretton, and Yeerongpilly were created.

The redistribution merged Chermside with Kedron to create the noationally Labor-held Stafford north of Brisbane, and Crows Nest with Western Downs to create the notionally National-held Darling Downs in regional Queensland. Notionally National-held Gaven was created on the Gold Coast, and notionally One Nation-held Glass House was created on the Sunshine Coast. Archerfield was renamed Algester, Caboolture was renamed Pumicestone, Merrimac was renamed Robina, Mooloolah was renamed Kawana, Nerang was renamed Mudgeeraba, Sunnybank was renamed Stretton, Warwick was renamed Southern Downs, and Yeronga was renamed Yeerongpilly. Albert notionally became Labor-held, Callide notionally became One Nation-held, while Springwood notionally became Liberal-held.

The changes resulted in 43 notionally Labor-held seats, 10 notionally Liberal-held seats, 21 notionally National-held seats, 13 notionally One Nation-held seats, and 2 notionally Independent-held seats.

- The member for Albert, Bill Baumann (National), contested Gaven.
- The member for Archerfield, Karen Struthers (Labor), contested Algester.
- The member for Barambah, Dorothy Pratt (Independent), contested Nanango.
- The member for Caboolture, Bill Feldman (City Country Alliance), contested Pumicestone.
- The member for Chermside, Terry Sullivan (Labor), contested Stafford.
- The member for Merrimac, Bob Quinn (Liberal), contested Robina.
- The member for Mooloolah, Bruce Laming (Liberal), contested Kawana.
- The member for Nerang, Ray Connor (Liberal), contested Mudgeeraba.
- The member for Sunnybank, Stephen Robertson (Labor), contested Stretton.
- The member for Warwick, Lawrence Springborg (National), contested Southern Downs.
- The member for Yeronga, Matt Foley (Labor), contested Yeerongpilly.

== By-elections ==
- On 5 December 1998, Warren Pitt (Labor) was elected to succeed Charles Rappolt (One Nation), who resigned on 4 November 1998, as the member for Mulgrave.
- On 5 February 2000, Jo-Ann Miller (Labor) was elected to succeed Bob Gibbs (Labor), who resigned on 14 December 1999, as the member for Bundamba.
- On 5 February 2000, Mike Kaiser (Labor) was elected to succeed Bill D'Arcy (Labor), who resigned on 9 January 2000, as the member for Woodridge.

== Retiring Members ==
=== Labor ===
- Paul Braddy MLA (Kedron)
- David Hamill MLA (Ipswich)

=== National ===
- Russell Cooper MLA (Crows Nest)
- Tony Elliott MLA (Cunningham)
- Brian Littleproud MLA (Western Downs)
- Len Stephan MLA (Gympie)

=== Independent ===
- Jim Elder MLA (Capalaba) — Elected for the Labor Party
- Mike Kaiser MLA (Woodridge) — Elected for the Labor Party
- Grant Musgrove MLA (Springwood) — Elected for the Labor Party

== Legislative Assembly ==
Sitting members are shown in bold text. Successful candidates are highlighted in the relevant colour. Where there is possible confusion, an asterisk (*) is also used.

Electorate	Held by	Labor candidate	Coalition candidate	One Nation candidate	CCA candidate	Greens candidate	Other candidates
Albert	Labor	Margaret Keech	Andrea Johanson (Lib); Tony McMullan (Nat)	Rod Evans			
Algester	Labor	**Karen Struthers**	Michele Cole (Lib)				Andrew Lamb (CDP); Brian Watt (Ind)
Ashgrove	Labor	**Jim Fouras**	Bryan Cook (Lib)			Mark Carey-Smith	Allen Anderson (Ind); Brett Matthews (Dem)
Aspley	Liberal	Bonny Barry	**John Goss** (Lib)				
Barron River	Labor	**Lesley Clark**	Lyn Warwick (Lib)	Peter Starr		Denis Walls	Sno Bonneau (Ind)
Beaudesert	National	Pam Stephenson	**Kev Lingard** (Nat)	Rae Benson			Kim Limbirg (Ind)
Brisbane Central	Labor	**Peter Beattie**	Joe Vasta (Lib)			Richard Nielsen	Dionne Buckley (Ind); Jayson Dalton (Ind); Alan Skyring (Ind); Tamara Tonite (Ind); Samuel Tornatore (Ind); Coral Wynter (Ind)
Broadwater	National	Peta-Kaye Croft	**Allan Grice** (Nat)				
Bulimba	Labor	**Pat Purcell**	Brent Woollett (Lib)				
Bundaberg	Labor	**Nita Cunningham**	David Porter (Nat)				
Bundamba	Labor	**Jo-Ann Miller**	Mardi McLean (Lib)			John McKeon	
Burdekin	One Nation	Steve Rodgers	Terry Morato (Nat)	Merle Poletto	**Jeff Knuth**		
Burleigh	National	Christine Smith	**Judy Gamin** (Nat)	Colleen Pepperell			
Burnett	National	Trevor Strong	**Doug Slack** (Nat)				
Cairns	Labor	**Desley Boyle**	Naomi Wilson (Nat)	Peter Gargan		Alistair Hart	
Callide	One Nation	Peter Allen	**Jeff Seeney** (Nat)	Jim Dwyer			
Caloundra	Liberal	Christine Anthony	**Joan Sheldon** (Lib)	Bruce Tannock			Neil Wilkinson (Ind)
Capalaba	Labor	Michael Choi	Phill Costello (Lib)	Mike O'Rourke			Tony Bowler (Ind); Mary Lou Brown (Ind); Murray Elliott (Ind); Les Reimers (Ind)
Charters Towers	National	Christine Scott	**Rob Mitchell** (Nat)	Mark Ree			
Chatsworth	Labor	**Terry Mackenroth**	Jo-Anne Leu (Lib)	Gabriel Echaubard		Rob Wilson	
Clayfield	Liberal	Liddy Clark	**Santo Santoro** (Lib)			Marit Hegge	Robert Brittan (Ind)
Cleveland	Labor	**Darryl Briskey**	Lynne Friis (Lib)				John Barton (Ind)
Cook	Labor	**Steve Bredhauer**	Lloyd Hollingsworth (Nat)	Alan Webb			
Cunningham	National	Leeann King	Stuart Copeland* (Nat); Peter Rookas (Lib)	David Drinan	John Reynolds		Ann Collins (Ind)
Currumbin	Labor	**Merri Rose**	Jann Stuckey (Lib)	Maurice Horsburgh			Helen Rossini (Ind)
Darling Downs	National	John Martin	Peter Taylor (Nat)				Ray Hopper (Ind)
Everton	Labor	**Rod Welford**	John Dangerfield (Lib)		Lynette Edwards		
Ferny Grove	Labor	**Geoff Wilson**	Kel Eaton (Lib)			Mike Stasse	
Fitzroy	Labor	**Jim Pearce**	Rod Lawrie (Nat)		Di Schuback		
Gaven	National	Robert Poole	**Bill Baumann** (Nat)			Sally Spain	David Cassidy (Ind); Phil Connolly (Ind)
Gladstone	Independent	Jennifer Ellingsen	Carl Hamann (Nat)			Rex Warren	**Liz Cunningham** (Ind)
Glass House	One Nation	Carolyn Male	Greg Chippendale (Nat); Debbie Taylor (Lib)	Santo Ferraro	Martin Janke	Dianne Cannon	
Greenslopes	Labor	**Gary Fenlon**	Andrew Edwards (Lib)		Greg Whitney	Sean Curley	
Gregory	National	Scott McDonell	**Vaughan Johnson** (Nat)				
Gympie	National	Rae Gate	Stephen Duff (Nat)	Elisa Roberts	Ian Petersen		
Hervey Bay	One Nation	Andrew McNamara	Randal McLellan (Nat)	Wesley Robinson	**David Dalgleish**		Wes Donnelly (Ind)
Hinchinbrook	National	Mick Small	**Marc Rowell** (Nat)	Robert Ralph	Elaine Steley		Andrew Lancini (Ind)
Inala	Labor	**Henry Palaszczuk**	Marie Jackson (Lib)				George Pugh (Ind)
Indooroopilly	Liberal	Ronan Lee	**Denver Beanland** (Lib)	John Drew		Drew Hutton	Nigel Freemarijuana (Ind); Mary Anne McIntyre (Dem); Geoffrey Sakzewski (Ind)
Ipswich	Labor	Rachel Nolan	Maria Forbes (Lib)	Rita Magnussen	Mike Atkin	Desiree Mahoney	Don Cameron (Ind); Noel Jaenke (Ind); Trevor Nardi (Ind)
Ipswich West	One Nation	Don Livingstone	David Pahlke (Nat)	Bob Dutton	**Jack Paff**	Ben Glass	
Kallangur	Labor	**Ken Hayward**	Scott Driscoll (Lib)		Ray Eldridge	Suzi Tooke	Neville Jones (Ind)
Kawana	Liberal	Chris Cummins	**Bruce Laming** (Lib)	Kevin Savage			
Keppel	National	Paul Hoolihan	**Vince Lester** (Nat)		Glenda Mather		
Kurwongbah	Labor	**Linda Lavarch**	Brenda Martin (Lib)		Steve Purtill	Kim Pantano	Matt Harrison (Dem)
Lockyer	One Nation	Virginia Clarke	Lindsay Christensen (Nat)	Bill Flynn	**Peter Prenzler**	Jo Nemeth	Angela Micallef (Ind); Ken Murray (Ind)
Logan	Labor	**John Mickel**	Joy Drescher (Nat)				
Lytton	Labor	**Paul Lucas**	Vincent Ladner (Lib)			Fay Smith	
Mackay	Labor	**Tim Mulherin**	Martin Bella (Nat)		Barry Townsend		
Mansfield	Labor	**Phil Reeves**	Frank Carroll (Lib)				Richard Leworthy (Ind)
Maroochydore	National	Malcolm Baillie	**Fiona Simpson** (Nat)	Rowena Wellard			
Maryborough	One Nation	Alan Holmes	Linda Harris (Nat)		Debbie Douglas		**John Kingston*** (Ind); Ray Smith (Ind)
Mirani	National	Richard Staker	**Ted Malone** (Nat)	Rob Robinson			Barry Gomersall (Ind); Edward Vaughan (Ind)
Moggill	Liberal	Laurie Lumsden	**David Watson** (Lib)			Lenore Taylor	Barry Searle (Ind); John Yesberg (Dem)
Mount Coot-tha	Labor	**Wendy Edmond**	Jenny Cannon (Lib)			Dick Copeman	Anne Boccabella (Ind); Adam Zaborszczyk (Dem)
Mount Gravatt	Labor	**Judy Spence**	Steven Huang (Lib)	Edmund McMahon		Daniel Lloyd	Ken Eggmolesse (Ind); Frank Tanti (Ind)
Mount Isa	Labor	**Tony McGrady**	Annie Clarke (Nat)	Larry Braden			
Mount Ommaney	Labor	**Julie Attwood**	Bob Harper (Lib)			Willy Bach	Angelo Bertoni (Ind)
Mudgeeraba	Liberal	Dianne Reilly	**Ray Connor** (Lib)			Inge Light	Ronald Bradley (Ind); Matt Keys (Ind); Dorothy Lyons (Ind)
Mulgrave	Labor	**Warren Pitt**	Barry Moyle (Nat)	Dominic Frisone			
Mundingburra	Labor	**Lindy Nelson-Carr**	David Moore (Lib)	Trevor Elson	Michael Staines	Rebecca Smith	
Murrumba	Labor	**Dean Wells**	Susan Haskell (Lib)				Rob McJannett (Ind)
Nanango	One Nation	Alan Weir	Keith Campbell (Nat)				**Dorothy Pratt** (Ind)
Nicklin	Independent	Philomena Boman	Warren Gardiner (Nat); Dot Whittington (Lib)	Clinton Booth		John Fitzgerald	**Peter Wellington** (Ind)
Noosa	Liberal	Cate Molloy	**Bruce Davidson** (Lib)	Ernie Lake			
Nudgee	Labor	**Neil Roberts**	Scott Taylor (Lib)				
Pumicestone	One Nation	Carryn Sullivan	Gary Parsons (Lib)	Wayne Whitney	**Bill Feldman**	Les Shotton	Dennis Rounsefell (Ind)
Redcliffe	Labor	**Ray Hollis**	Peter Rankin (Lib)		Peter Salisbury		Rae Frawley (Ind); Len Matthews (Ind); Robert White (Ind)
Redlands	National	John English	**John Hegarty** (Nat)		Susan Hancock		John Burns (Ind)
Robina	Liberal	Bruce Simmonds	**Bob Quinn** (Lib)				
Rockhampton	Labor	**Robert Schwarten**	Ron Bahnisch (Nat)		Peter Schuback		
Sandgate	Labor	**Gordon Nuttall**	Don Young (Lib)				Ron Eaton (Ind)
South Brisbane	Labor	**Anna Bligh**	Jason Chappel (Lib)			Mark Taylor	Adam Baker (Ind); Guy Freemarijuana (Ind); Crystal Lagos (Dem); Murray Swan (Ind)
Southern Downs	National	Stella Rey	**Lawrence Springborg** (Nat)				Joan White (Ind)
Southport	National	Peter Lawlor	**Mick Veivers** (Nat)	Lesley Millar			Aaron Cortenbach (Ind)
Springwood	Liberal	Barbara Stone	Darren Power (Nat); Bob Ward (Lib)				Hetty Johnston (Ind)
Stafford	Labor	**Terry Sullivan**	Zenia Belcher (Lib)			Sue Meehan	
Stretton	Labor	**Stephen Robertson**	David Lin (Lib)				
Surfers Paradise	National	Richard Alcorn	**Rob Borbidge** (Nat)			Dean Hepburn	
Tablelands	One Nation	Arthur Yates	Joe Moro (Nat)	Rosa Lee Long			Henry Condon (Ind); Alan Isherwood (Ind); **Shaun Nelson** (Ind)
Thuringowa	One Nation	Anita Phillips	Marnie Nelson (Lib); Neil Weekes (Nat)		Adam Morton		Wolfe Lindner (Ind); **Ken Turner** (Ind)
Toowoomba North	National	Kerry Shine	**Graham Healy** (Nat)		Frank Francis		Rob Berry (Ind); Grahame Mogg (Ind)
Toowoomba South	National	Peter Shooter	**Mike Horan** (Nat)	David Hoy			Hugh Wilson (Ind)
Townsville	Labor	**Mike Reynolds**	Fay Barker (Lib)				Billy Tait (Ind); Wendy Tubman (Ind)
Warrego	National	Anthony Chisholm	**Howard Hobbs** (Nat)	Robert Burton			Wally Gleeson (Ind)
Waterford	Labor	**Tom Barton**	Richard Somers (Lib)	June Woodward			David Howse (Ind)
Whitsunday	One Nation	Jan Jarratt	Dave Perkins (Nat)	David Haselgrove	**Harry Black**		Ken Smyth (Ind)
Woodridge	Labor	Desley Scott	Jane Simon (Lib)	Alice Ngahooro			John Grant (Ind); Jody Moore (Ind)
Yeerongpilly	Labor	**Matt Foley**	Russell Miles (Lib)			Stephen Burchall	Michael Bond (Ind); Darryl Wheeley (Ind)

== See also ==
- Members of the Queensland Legislative Assembly, 1998–2001
- Members of the Queensland Legislative Assembly, 2001–2004
- 2001 Queensland state election
