= List of One Nation elected representatives =

Since it was formed in 1997, Pauline Hanson's One Nation has had a number of elected representatives at the federal, state and local level in Australia.

As of June 2018, more than two-thirds of all elected One Nation members had left the party before the end of their term.

== Federal ==
=== Current ===
Image	Name (birth–death)	Office	Term start	Term end	Notes
	Pauline Hanson (born 1954)	Senator for Queensland	2 July 2016	Incumbent	Previously MP for Oxley (1997–1998), lost seat
	Malcolm Roberts (born 1955)	Senator for Queensland	1 July 2019	Incumbent	Previously Senator for Queensland (2016–2017), disqualified from parliament
	Tyron Whitten (born 1971)	Senator for Western Australia	1 July 2025	Incumbent	
	Sean Bell (born 1986–87)	Senator for New South Wales	18 September 2025	Incumbent	Elected after Warwick Stacey resigned
	Barnaby Joyce (born 1967)	Member for New England	8 December 2025	Incumbent	Joined One Nation
	David Farley (born 1957)	Member for Farrer	9 May 2026	Incumbent	Elected at the 2026 Farrer by-election

=== Former ===
Image	Name (birth–death)	Office	Term start	Term end	Notes
	Heather Hill (born 1960)	Senator-elect for Queensland	3 October 1998	23 June 1999	Never officially took office after her election was found to be invalid
	Len Harris (born 1943)	Senator for Queensland	2 July 1999	30 June 2005	Appointed after disqualification of Heather Hill. Lost seat
	Brian Burston (born 1948)	Senator for New South Wales	2 July 2016	14 June 2018	Resigned from One Nation and joined United Australia Party
	Rod Culleton (born 1964)	Senator for Western Australia	2 July 2016	18 December 2016	Resigned from One Nation
	Peter Georgiou (born 1974)	Senator for Western Australia	27 March 2017	30 June 2019	Elected after Rod Culleton was disqualified from parliament. Lost seat
	Fraser Anning (born 1949)	Senator for Queensland	10 November 2017	13 November 2017	Elected after Malcolm Roberts was disqualified from parliament. Resigned from One Nation
	George Christensen (born 1978)	Member for Dawson	27 March 2022	11 April 2022	Joined One Nation. Did not re-contest seat and unsuccessfully contested Senate
	Warwick Stacey (born 1952)	Senator for New South Wales	1 July 2025	19 August 2025	Resigned from office due to ill health

== State ==
=== New South Wales ===
==== Former ====
Image	Name (birth–death)	Office	Term start	Term end	Notes
	David Oldfield (born 1958)	Member of the Legislative Council	27 March 1999	8 October 2000	Previously alderman of Manly Council (1997–98). Expelled from One Nation
	Mark Latham (born 1961)	Member of the Legislative Council	23 March 2019	2 March 2023	Resigned from One Nation
	Mark Latham (born 1961)	Member of the Legislative Council	25 March 2023	22 August 2023	Resigned from One Nation
	Rod Roberts	Member of the Legislative Council	23 March 2019	22 August 2023	Resigned from One Nation
	Tania Mihailuk (born 1976)	Member of the Legislative Council	10 May 2023	20 December 2024	Previously MP for Bankstown and joined One Nation while an MP. Resigned from One Nation

=== Queensland ===
==== Former ====
Image	Name (birth–death)	Office	Term start	Term end	Notes
	Charles Rappolt (1939–1999)	Member for Mulgrave	13 June 1998	4 November 1998	Resigned from parliament
	Shaun Nelson (born 1973)	Member for Tablelands	13 June 1998	2 February 1999	Resigned from One Nation
	Dorothy Pratt (born 1955)	Member for Barambah	13 June 1998	2 February 1999	Resigned from One Nation
	Ken Turner (born 1944)	Member for Thuringowa	13 June 1998	2 February 1999	Resigned from One Nation
	John Kingston (1935–2024)	Member for Maryborough	13 June 1998	23 February 1999	Resigned from One Nation
	Jeff Knuth (born 1962)	Member for Burdekin	13 June 1998	23 February 1999	Resigned from One Nation
	Harry Black (born 1947)	Member for Whitsunday	13 June 1998	14 December 1999	Resigned from One Nation
	David Dalgleish (born 1962)	Member for Hervey Bay	13 June 1998	14 December 1999	Resigned from One Nation
	Bill Feldman (born 1958)	Member for Caboolture	13 June 1998	14 December 1999	Resigned from One Nation
	Jack Paff (born 1938)	Member for Ipswich West	13 June 1998	14 December 1999	Resigned from One Nation
	Peter Prenzler (born 1952)	Member for Lockyer	13 June 1998	14 December 1999	Resigned from One Nation
	Elisa Roberts (born 1970)	Member for Gympie	17 February 2001	18 April 2002	Resigned from One Nation
	Bill Flynn (1951–2011)	Member for Lockyer	17 February 2001	7 February 2004	Lost seat
	Rosa Lee Long (born 1945)	Member for Tablelands	17 February 2001	20 March 2009	Lost seat
	Steve Dickson (born 1962)	Member for Buderim	13 January 2017	25 November 2017	Joined party. Lost seat
	Stephen Andrew (born 1968)	Member for Mirani	25 November 2017	2 August 2024	Resigned from One Nation after losing preselection

=== South Australia ===
==== Current ====
Image	Name (birth–death)	Office	Term start	Term end	Notes
	David Paton	Member for Ngadjuri	21 March 2026	Incumbent	
	Jason Virgo	Member for MacKillop	21 March 2026	Incumbent	
	Chantelle Thomas	Member for Narungga	21 March 2026	Incumbent	
	Robert Roylance	Member for Hammond	21 March 2026	Incumbent	
	Cory Bernardi	Member for Legislative Council	21 March 2026	Incumbent	
	Carlos Quaremba	Member for Legislative Council	21 March 2026	Incumbent	
	Rebecca Hewett	Member for Legislative Council	21 March 2026	Incumbent	

==== Former ====
Image	Name (birth–death)	Office	Term start	Term end	Notes
	Sarah Game	Member of the Legislative Council	19 March 2022	17 May 2025	Resigned from One Nation

=== Victoria ===
==== Current ====
Image	Name (birth–death)	Office	Term start	Term end	Notes
	Rikkie-Lee Tyrrell	MLC for Northern Victoria	26 November 2022	Incumbent	

=== Western Australia ===
==== Current ====
Image	Name (birth–death)	Office	Term start	Term end	Notes
	Rod Caddies	MLC	2025	Incumbent	Leader of One Nation Western Australia
	Phil Scott	MLC	2025	Incumbent	
	Luke Herdegen	MLA for Secret Harbour	2026	Incumbent	The first One Nation candidate elected to the Western Australian Legislative Assembly

==== Former ====
Image	Name (birth–death)	Office	Term start	Term end	Notes
	John Fischer (born 1947)	MLC for Mining and Pastoral	10 February 2001	29 May 2004	Resigned from One Nation
	Frank Hough (born 1944)	MLC for Agricultural	10 February 2001	29 May 2004	Resigned from One Nation
	Paddy Embry (born 1942)	MLC for South West	10 February 2001	15 May 2003	Resigned from One Nation
	Charles Smith (born 1970)	MLC for East Metropolitan	22 May 2017	12 June 2019	Resigned from One Nation
	Colin Tincknell (born 1953)	MLC for South West	22 May 2017	21 May 2021	Lost seat
	Robin Scott (born 1953)	MLC for Mining and Pastoral	22 May 2017	21 May 2021	Lost seat
	Ben Dawkins (born 1971)	MLC for South West	29 February 2024	19 December 2024	Joined party. Resigned from One Nation

== Local ==
=== Victoria ===
==== Current ====
Image	Name (birth–death)	Office	Term start	Term end	Notes
	Ben Lucas	Councillor for the Shire of Baw Baw	27 October 2025	Incumbent	Previously a member of the Liberal Party

=== New South Wales ===
==== Current ====
Image	Name (birth–death)	Office	Term start	Term end	Notes
	Colin Grigg	Councillor for the City of Lake Macquarie	17 May 2022	Incumbent	Also a member of Lake Macquarie Independents
	Adam Zahra	Councillor for the City of Campbelltown	14 September 2024	Incumbent	
	Quintin King	Councillor for the City of Cessnock	14 September 2024	Incumbent	

==== Former ====
Image	Name (birth–death)	Office	Term start	Term end	Notes
	Bob Thompson	Councillor for the City of Campbelltown	11 September 1999	c. 2000–2004	Resigned from One Nation
	Peter Kelly	Councillor for Ku-ring-gai Council	9 September 2017	c. 2019	Resigned from One Nation
	Marcus Cornish	Councillor for the City of Penrith	6 December 2017	11 January 2019	Joined party. Resigned from One Nation
