= Members of the Queensland Legislative Assembly, 1998–2001 =

Members of the Queensland Legislative Assembly, 1998–2001

This is a list of members of the 49th Legislative Assembly of Queensland from 1998 to 2001, as elected at the 1998 state election held on 13 June 1998.

| Name | Party | District | Term in office |
|---|---|---|---|
| Julie Attwood | Labor | Mount Ommaney | 1998–2012 |
| Hon Tom Barton | Labor | Waterford | 1992–2006 |
| Bill Baumann | National | Albert | 1995–2001 |
| Denver Beanland | Liberal | Indooroopilly | 1986–2001 |
| Hon Peter Beattie | Labor | Brisbane Central | 1989–2007 |
| Harry Black | One Nation/CCA ^{[4]} | Whitsunday | 1998–2001 |
| Hon Anna Bligh | Labor | South Brisbane | 1995–2012 |
| Hon Rob Borbidge | National | Surfers Paradise | 1980–2001 |
| Desley Boyle | Labor | Cairns | 1998–2012 |
| Hon Paul Braddy | Labor | Kedron | 1985–2001 |
| Hon Steve Bredhauer | Labor | Cook | 1989–2004 |
| Darryl Briskey | Labor | Cleveland | 1989–2006 |
| Dr Lesley Clark | Labor | Barron River | 1989–1995, 1998–2006 |
| Ray Connor | Liberal | Nerang | 1989–2001 |
| Hon Russell Cooper | National | Crows Nest | 1983–2001 |
| Liz Cunningham | Independent | Gladstone | 1995–2015 |
| Nita Cunningham | Labor | Bundaberg | 1998–2006 |
| Bill D'Arcy ^{[6]} | Labor | Woodridge | 1972–1974, 1977–2000 |
| David Dalgleish | One Nation/CCA ^{[4]} | Hervey Bay | 1998–2001 |
| Bruce Davidson | Liberal | Noosa | 1992–2001 |
| Hon Wendy Edmond | Labor | Mount Coot-tha | 1989–2004 |
| Hon Jim Elder | Labor/Independent ^{[7]} | Capalaba | 1989–2001 |
| Tony Elliott | National | Cunningham | 1974–2001 |
| Bill Feldman | One Nation/CCA ^{[4]} | Caboolture | 1998–2001 |
| Gary Fenlon | Labor | Greenslopes | 1989–1995, 1998–2009 |
| Hon Matt Foley | Labor | Yeronga | 1989–2004 |
| Jim Fouras | Labor | Ashgrove | 1977–1986, 1989–2006 |
| Judy Gamin | National | Burleigh | 1988–1989, 1992–2001 |
| Hon Bob Gibbs ^{[5]} | Labor | Bundamba | 1977–1999 |
| John Goss | Liberal | Aspley | 1989–2001 |
| Allan Grice | National | Broadwater | 1992–2001 |
| Hon David Hamill | Labor | Ipswich | 1983–2001 |
| Hon Ken Hayward | Labor | Kallangur | 1986–2009 |
| Graham Healy | National | Toowoomba North | 1992–2001 |
| John Hegarty | National | Redlands | 1995–2001 |
| Howard Hobbs | National | Warrego | 1986–2015 |
| Hon Ray Hollis | Labor | Redcliffe | 1989–2005 |
| Mike Horan | National | Toowoomba South | 1991–2012 |
| Hon Vaughan Johnson | National | Gregory | 1989–2015 |
| Mike Kaiser ^{[6]} | Labor/Independent ^{[6]} | Woodridge | 2000–2001 |
| Dr John Kingston | One Nation/Independent ^{[3]} | Maryborough | 1998–2003 |
| Jeff Knuth | One Nation/Ind/CPQ/CCA ^{[3]}^{[4]} | Burdekin | 1998–2001 |
| Bruce Laming | Liberal | Mooloolah | 1992–2001 |
| Linda Lavarch | Labor | Kurwongbah | 1997–2009 |
| Hon Vince Lester | National | Keppel | 1974–2004 |
| Hon Kev Lingard | National | Beaudesert | 1983–2009 |
| Hon Brian Littleproud | National | Western Downs | 1983–2001 |
| Paul Lucas | Labor | Lytton | 1996–2012 |
| Hon Terry Mackenroth | Labor | Chatsworth | 1977–2005 |
| Ted Malone | National | Mirani | 1994–2015 |
| Hon Tony McGrady | Labor | Mount Isa | 1989–2006 |
| John Mickel | Labor | Logan | 1998–2012 |
| Jo-Ann Miller ^{[5]} | Labor | Bundamba | 2000–2020 |
| Rob Mitchell | National | Charters Towers | 1992–2001 |
| Tim Mulherin | Labor | Mackay | 1995–2015 |
| Grant Musgrove | Labor/Independent ^{[8]} | Springwood | 1998–2001 |
| Shaun Nelson | One Nation/Independent ^{[2]} | Tablelands | 1998–2001 |
| Lindy Nelson-Carr | Labor | Mundingburra | 1998–2012 |
| Gordon Nuttall | Labor | Sandgate | 1992–2006 |
| Jack Paff ^{[4]} | One Nation/CCA | Ipswich West | 1998–2001 |
| Henry Palaszczuk | Labor | Inala | 1984–2006 |
| Jim Pearce | Labor | Fitzroy | 1989–2009, 2015–2017 |
| Warren Pitt ^{[1]} | Labor | Mulgrave | 1989–1995, 1998–2009 |
| Dorothy Pratt | One Nation/Independent ^{[2]} | Barambah | 1998–2012 |
| Dr Peter Prenzler ^{[4]} | One Nation/CCA | Lockyer | 1998–2001 |
| Pat Purcell | Labor | Bulimba | 1992–2009 |
| Hon Bob Quinn | Liberal | Merrimac | 1989–2006 |
| Charles Rappolt ^{[1]} | One Nation | Mulgrave | 1998 |
| Phil Reeves | Labor | Mansfield | 1998–2012 |
| Mike Reynolds | Labor | Townsville | 1998–2009 |
| Neil Roberts | Labor | Nudgee | 1995–2012 |
| Stephen Robertson | Labor | Sunnybank | 1992–2012 |
| Hon Merri Rose | Labor | Currumbin | 1992–2004 |
| Marc Rowell | National | Hinchinbrook | 1989–2006 |
| Santo Santoro | Liberal | Clayfield | 1989–2001 |
| Hon Robert Schwarten | Labor | Rockhampton | 1989–1992, 1995–2012 |
| Jeff Seeney | National | Callide | 1998–2017 |
| Joan Sheldon | Liberal | Caloundra | 1990–2004 |
| Fiona Simpson | National | Maroochydore | 1992–present |
| Doug Slack | National | Burnett | 1986–2001 |
| Hon Judy Spence | Labor | Mount Gravatt | 1989–2012 |
| Lawrence Springborg | National | Warwick | 1989–2017 |
| Len Stephan | National | Gympie | 1979–2001 |
| Karen Struthers | Labor | Archerfield | 1998–2012 |
| Terry Sullivan | Labor | Chermside | 1991–2006 |
| Ken Turner | One Nation/Independent ^{[2]} | Thuringowa | 1998–2001 |
| Mick Veivers | National | Southport | 1987–2001 |
| Dr David Watson | Liberal | Moggill | 1989–2004 |
| Hon Rod Welford | Labor | Everton | 1989–2009 |
| Peter Wellington | Independent | Nicklin | 1998–2017 |
| Hon Dean Wells | Labor | Murrumba | 1986–2012 |
| Geoff Wilson | Labor | Ferny Grove | 1998–2012 |

^{1} On 4 November 1998, the One Nation member for Mulgrave, Charles Rappolt, resigned. Labor candidate Warren Pitt, who had represented Mulgrave between 1989 and 1995, won the resulting by-election on 5 December 1998.
^{2} One Nation members Shaun Nelson, Dorothy Pratt and Ken Turner left the party on 2 February 1999, and served out the remainder of their terms as independents.
^{3} One Nation members John Kingston and Jeff Knuth left the party on 23 February 1999. Kingston served out his term as an independent. Knuth sat as an independent until 5 August 1999, when he attempted to found his own party, the Country Party QLD.
^{4} The five remaining One Nation members, Harry Black, David Dalgleish, Bill Feldman, Jack Paff and Peter Prenzler, abandoned the party on 14 December 1999, founding their own alternative, the City Country Alliance. The five were later joined by prior colleague Knuth on 18 February 2000, once his own new party began to founder.
^{5} On 14 December 1999, the Labor member for Bundamba, Bob Gibbs, resigned. Labor candidate Jo-Ann Miller won the resulting by-election on 5 February 2000.
^{6} On 9 January 2000, the Labor member for Woodridge, Bill D'Arcy, resigned. Labor candidate Mike Kaiser won the resulting by-election on 5 February 2000. Kaiser left the Labor Party on 10 January 2001 as a consequence of the Shepherdson Inquiry's investigation of his role in an electoral rorting scandal. He served out his term as an independent and did not contest the 2001 election.
^{7} The member for Capalaba, Jim Elder, was elected as a Labor member and served as Deputy Premier under Peter Beattie, but left the party on 30 November 2000 following revelations from the Shepherdson Inquiry about his alleged behaviour. He served out the final months of his term as an independent and did not contest the 2001 election.
^{8} The member for Springwood, Grant Musgrove, was elected as a Labor member, but was forced to leave the party on 4 December 2000. He also served out the remainder of his term as an independent and did not contest the 2001 election.

== See also ==
- 1998 Queensland state election
- Beattie Ministry (Labor) 1998–2007
