= 2001 Queensland state election =

- 17 February 2001

All 89 seats in the Legislative Assembly 45 seats are needed for a majority
- Registered: 2,276,044 ▲7.56%
- Turnout: 2,107,410 (92.59%) (▼0.26pp)
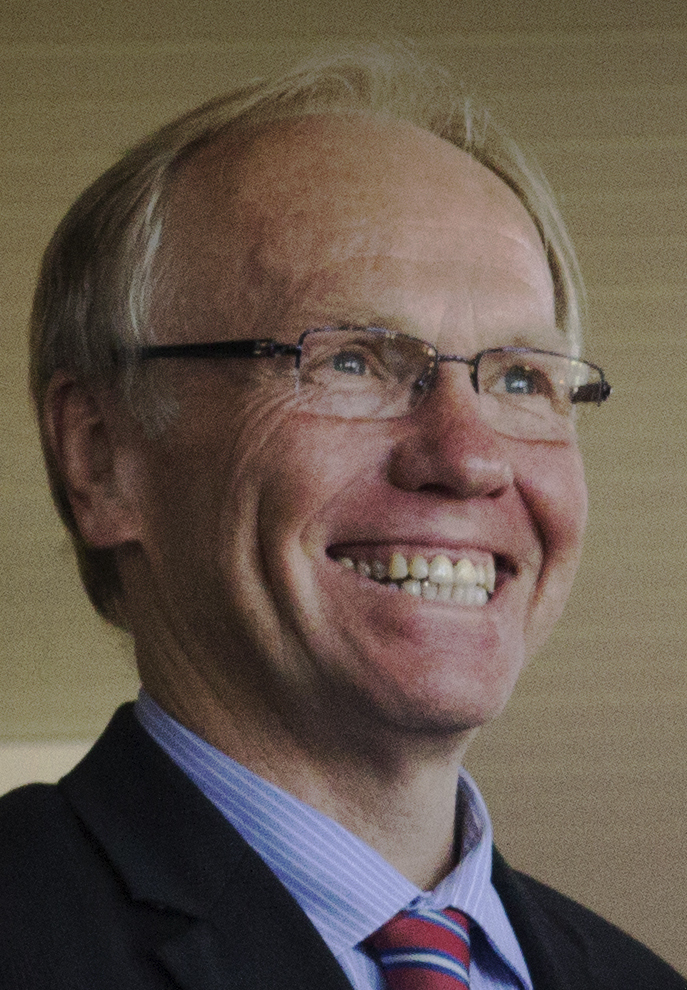

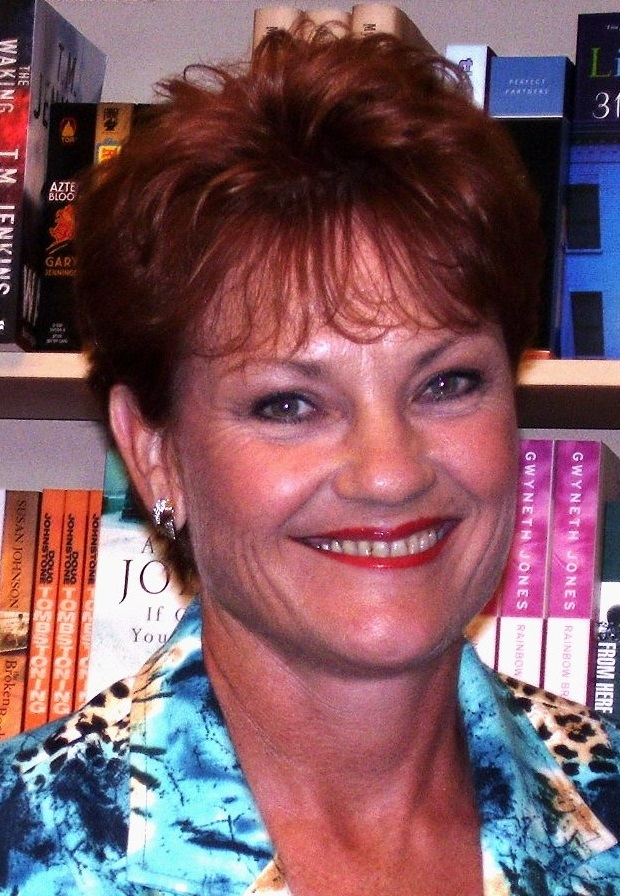
	First party	Second party	Third party
Leader	Peter Beattie	Rob Borbidge	David Watson
Party	Labor	National	Liberal
Leader since	19 February 1996	10 December 1991	23 June 1998
Leader's seat	Brisbane Central	Surfers Paradise	Moggill
Last election	44 seats, 38.86%	23 seats, 15.17%	9 seats, 16.09%
Seats won	66	12	3
Seat change	▲22	▼11	▼6
Popular vote	1,007,737	291,605	294,968
Percentage	48.93%	14.16%	14.32%
Swing	▲10.07	▼1.02	▼1.77
	Fourth party	Fifth party
		CCA
Leader	Pauline Hanson	Bill Feldman
Party	One Nation	City Country Alliance
Leader since	N/A	13 December 1999
Leader's seat	N/A	Caboolture
Last election	11 seats, 22.68%	Did not exist
Seats won	3	0 (Note: The six City Country Alliance MLAs represented in the Queensland Parliament broke away from the One Nation party post-1998 state election.)
Seat change	▼8	▼6
Popular vote	179,076	49,263
Percentage	8.69%	2.39%
Swing	▼13.98	▲2.39
Premier before election
Peter Beattie
Labor
Elected Premier
Peter Beattie
Labor

The 2001 Queensland state election was held on 17 February 2001 to elect the 89 members of the state's Legislative Assembly. The result of the election was the return of the Labor Party (ALP) government of Premier Peter Beattie, with an increased majority in a landslide. Labor won 66 seats, easily the most it has ever won in Queensland and one of Labor's best-ever results nationwide. There was a 10.07% swing towards Labor, while One Nation suffered a 13.98% swing against it, losing eight seats (five of which were held by the newly formed City Country Alliance after an internal split in December 1999).

The longstanding coalition between the Nationals and Liberals, led by Nationals leader (and former premier) Rob Borbidge recorded only a 2.79% swing against it. However, its support in Brisbane all but vanished; indeed, Labor won every seat in Brisbane except Moggill. Largely due to losses in Brisbane, the Coalition suffered an overall 17-seat loss. This included only three seats for the Liberals, easily the worst showing for the urban non-Labor party in Queensland since it adopted the Liberal banner in 1948. The 'Just Vote 1' strategy adopted by the Labor campaign (capitalising on Queensland's optional preferential voting system) was also considered to be effective in reducing preference flows between the Coalition parties, thereby dampening the combined strength of the conservative parties.

== Background ==
The ALP had formed a minority government after the 1998 election, but after victory at the 1998 Mulgrave state by-election secured a one-seat majority with 45 out of 89 seats in parliament. In 2000, an "electoral rorts" scandal emerged over historic allegations of electoral fraud involving ALP members, with the Criminal Justice Commission convening an independent inquiry led by former Supreme Court judge Tom Shepherdson. The Shepherdson Inquiry resulted in the resignation of deputy premier Jim Elder and backbencher Grant Musgrove from the ALP, with the Beattie government consequently placed in a minority position again in December 2000.

One Nation had polled the second-highest vote total at the 1998 election, but in 1999 was found to have been improperly registered and its leader Pauline Hanson was directed to repay the electoral funding it had received. The party was not re-registered by the Queensland Electoral Commission until January 2001. In the lead-up to the election, six One Nation MPs left to form a new party, the City Country Alliance.

== Campaign ==
According to John Wanna, the election campaign was marked by a focus on the key personalities – Beattie, Borbidge and Hanson – rather than policy matters. Opinion polling showed a consistently high approval rating for Beattie, increasing to 66 percent by the end of the campaign, with Borbidge's approval rating as low as 13 percent. Liberal leader David Watson struggled for recognition and during the campaign was the subject of internal discontent over his criticisms of the Howard government's petrol excise policies, although no formal challenge to his leadership emerged.

Beattie completed a three-week "listening tour" of Queensland and attracted media coverage through a number of publicity stunts including "swimming with sharks, nursing piglets and wearing funny hats at events and on construction sites". Borbidge's campaign focused on the Shepherdson Inquiry findings, but struggled to gain traction.

Hanson left Queensland only a week after the election was called to campaign at the 2001 Western Australian state election and did not return to Queensland until the final week, conducting a series of rapid-fire visits to seats via helicopter. The City-Country Alliance publicly offered to mount a joint campaign with One Nation, with party leader Bill Feldman unsuccessfully suggesting an electoral pact to avoid competing in the same seats.

=== Preferencing strategies ===
The ALP adopted a "just vote 1" strategy to capitalise on the optional preferential voting system in place, directing voters to only number a single box on the ballot paper rather than listing preferences. This forced the National Party to redirect resources to historically safe rural seats where their candidates were being challenged by One Nation and the City-Country Alliance, which they might otherwise have relied on ALP preferences to win.

The Coalition directed voters to preference One Nation and the City-Country Alliance last, although two Nationals candidate broke ranks and stated they would preference Labor last. One Nation directed preferences against all sitting members, "on the grounds that they were all part of an establishment elite who acted against the interests of the local electorate".

== Key dates ==
Beattie adjourned parliament in November 2000 over concerns his government would be seen to be reliant on the votes of individuals implicated in the Shepherdson Inquiry. In January 2001 he announced an early election would be held.

Date	Event
23 January 2001	Writs were issued by the Governor to proceed with an election.
29 January 2001	Close of electoral rolls.
30 January 2001	Close of nominations.
17 February 2001	Polling day, between the hours of 8am and 6pm.
22 February 2001	The Beattie Ministry was reconstituted.
2 March 2001	The writ was returned and the results formally declared.

== Electoral redistribution ==
A redistribution of electoral boundaries occurred in 1999.

The electorates of Archerfield, Barambah, Caboolture, Chermside, Crows Nest, Kedron, Merrimac, Mooloolah, Nerang, Sunnybank, Warwick, Western Downs, and Yeronga were abolished.

The electorates of Algester, Darling Downs, Gaven, Glass House, Kawana, Mudgeeraba, Nanango, Pumicestone, Robina, Southern Downs, Stafford, Stretton, and Yeerongpilly were created.

The redistribution merged Chermside with Kedron to create the notionally Labor-held Stafford north of Brisbane, and Crows Nest with Western Downs to create the notionally National-held Darling Downs in regional Queensland. Notionally National-held Gaven was created on the Gold Coast, and notionally One Nation-held Glass House was created on the Sunshine Coast. Archerfield was renamed Algester, Caboolture was renamed Pumicestone, Merrimac was renamed Robina, Mooloolah was renamed Kawana, Nerang was renamed Mudgeeraba, Sunnybank was renamed Stretton, Warwick was renamed Southern Downs, and Yeronga was renamed Yeerongpilly. Albert notionally became Labor-held, Callide notionally became One Nation-held, while Springwood notionally became Liberal-held.

The changes resulted in 43 notionally Labor-held seats, 10 notionally Liberal-held seats, 21 notionally National-held seats, 13 notionally One Nation-held seats, and 2 notionally Independent-held seats.

== Retiring members ==
=== Labor ===
- Paul Braddy MLA (Kedron)
- David Hamill MLA (Ipswich)

=== National ===
- Russell Cooper MLA (Crows Nest)
- Tony Elliott MLA (Cunningham)
- Brian Littleproud MLA (Western Downs)
- Len Stephan MLA (Gympie)

=== Independent ===
- Jim Elder MLA (Capalaba) – Elected for the Labor Party
- Mike Kaiser MLA (Woodridge) – Elected for the Labor Party
- Grant Musgrove MLA (Springwood) – Elected for the Labor Party

== Results ==
Winning party by electorate.

Party	Votes	%	+/–	Seats	+/–
Labor	1,007,737	48.93	▲10.07	66	▲22
Liberal	294,968	14.32	▼1.77	3	▼6
National	291,605	14.16	▼1.02	12	▼11
One Nation	179,076	8.69	▼13.98	3	▼8
Independents	177,334	8.61	▲6.44	5	▲3
Greens	51,630	2.51	▲0.15	0	0
City Country Alliance	49,263	2.39	New	0	New
Democrats	7,029	0.34	▼1.27	0	0
Christian Democrats	919	0.04	▼0.07	0	0
Total	2,059,561	100.00	–	89	–
Valid votes	2,059,561	97.73			
Invalid/blank votes	47,849	2.27	▲0.84		
Total votes	2,107,410	100.00	–		
Registered voters/turnout	2,276,044	92.59	▼0.26		

Popular vote
Labor	48.93%
Liberal	14.32%
Nationals	14.16%
One Nation	8.69%
Greens	2.51%
City Country Alliance	2.39%
Democrats	0.34%
Christian Democrats	0.04%
Independents	8.61%

Seats
Labor	74.16%
Nationals	13.48%
Liberal	3.37%
One Nation	3.37%
Independents	5.62%

== Seats changing hands ==
Seat	1999 Redistribution			Swing	2001 Election		
Seat	Party	Member	Margin	Swing	Margin	Member	Party
Aspley	Liberal	John Goss	2.00	–6.69	4.69	Bonny Barry	Labor
Broadwater	National	Allan Grice	10.70	–13.15	2.45	Peta-Kaye Croft	Labor
Burdekin	One Nation	Jeff Knuth¹	8.90	–14.03	5.13	Steve Rodgers	Labor
Burleigh	National	Judy Gamin	8.50	–10.28	1.78	Christine Smith	Labor
Burnett	National	Doug Slack	1.40	–3.10	1.70	Trevor Strong	Labor
Charters Towers	National	Rob Mitchell	3.20	–5.37	2.17	Christine Scott	Labor
Clayfield	Liberal	Santo Santoro	4.50	–6.48	1.98	Liddy Clark	Labor
Darling Downs	National	Russell Cooper	5.10	–6.23	1.13	Ray Hopper	Independent
Gaven	National	Bill Baumann	7.30	–14.90	7.60	Robert Poole	Labor
Glass House	One Nation	notional (new seat)	4.30	–13.88	9.58	Carolyn Male	Labor
Gympie	National	Len Stephan	3.50	–6.76	3.26	Elisa Roberts	One Nation
Hervey Bay	One Nation	David Dalgleish¹	4.20	–11.83	7.63	Andrew McNamara	Labor
Indooroopilly	Liberal	Denver Beanland	0.40	–3.28	2.88	Ronan Lee	Labor
Ipswich West	One Nation	Jack Paff¹	4.30	–11.60	7.30	Don Livingstone	Labor
Kawana	Liberal	Bruce Laming	16.10	–18.72	2.62	Chris Cummins	Labor
Maryborough	One Nation	John Kingston²	8.50	–9.00	0.50	John Kingston	Independent
Mudgeeraba	Liberal	Ray Connor	11.60	–18.37	6.77	Dianne Reilly	Labor
Mulgrave	One Nation	notional³	2.70	–13.99	11.29	Warren Pitt	Labor
Nanango	One Nation	Dorothy Pratt²	2.20	–19.27	17.07	Dorothy Pratt	Independent
Noosa	Liberal	Bruce Davidson	10.40	–11.30	0.90	Cate Molloy	Labor
Pumicestone	One Nation	Bill Feldman¹	0.80	–16.90	16.10	Carryn Sullivan	Labor
Redlands	National	John Hegarty	0.60	–7.46	6.86	John English	Labor
Southport	National	Mick Veivers	3.10	–13.94	10.84	Peter Lawlor	Labor
Springwood	Independent	Grant Musgrove	0.30	–10.67	10.37	Barbara Stone	Labor
Thuringowa	One Nation	Ken Turner²	5.60	–9.16	3.56	Anita Phillips	Labor
Toowoomba North	National	Graham Healy	10.0	–11.87	1.87	Kerry Shine	Labor
Whitsunday	One Nation	Harry Black¹	3.20	–12.78	9.58	Jan Jarratt	Labor

- Members listed in italics did not contest their seat at this election.
- ^{1} Jeff Knuth, David Dalgleish, Jack Paff, Bill Feldman, and Harry Black were elected as members of the One Nation Party, but resigned in 1999 and formed the City Country Alliance, and contested the 2001 election for that party.
- ^{2} John Kingston, Dorothy Pratt, and Ken Turner were elected as members of the One Nation Party, but resigned in 1999, and contested the 2001 election as independents.
- ^{3} Warren Pitt gained Mulgrave for the Labor Party in the 1998 by-election. The One Nation Party had won the seat at the 1998 election.
- The Labor Party also retained the seat of Albert which had a notional Labor margin, and the seats of Capalaba and Woodridge, where sitting Labor members had resigned to become Independents.
- The One Nation Party also retained the seat of Lockyer, where the sitting member contested the 2001 election as a member of the City Country Alliance, and Tablelands, where the sitting member contested the 2001 election as an independent.

== Post-election pendulum ==
Labor seats (66)
Marginal
Noosa	Cate Molloy	ALP	0.90%
Burnett	Trevor Strong	ALP	1.70%
Burleigh	Christine Smith	ALP	1.78%
Toowoomba North	Kerry Shine	ALP	1.87%
Clayfield	Liddy Clark	ALP	1.98%
Charters Towers	Christine Scott	ALP	2.17%
Broadwater	Peta-Kaye Croft	ALP	2.45%
Kawana	Chris Cummins	ALP	2.62%
Indooroopilly	Ronan Lee	ALP	2.88%
Thuringowa	Anita Phillips	ALP	3.56% v IND
Aspley	Bonny Barry	ALP	4.69%
Burdekin	Steve Rodgers	ALP	5.13%
Fairly Safe
Mudgeeraba	Dianne Reilly	ALP	6.77%
Redlands	John English	ALP	6.86%
Barron River	Lesley Clark	ALP	7.26% v IND
Ipswich West	Don Livingstone	ALP	7.30% v ONP
Gaven	Robert Poole	ALP	7.60%
Hervey Bay	Andrew McNamara	ALP	7.63% v ONP
Mansfield	Phil Reeves	ALP	8.62%
Mount Ommaney	Julie Attwood	ALP	8.74% v IND
Townsville	Mike Reynolds	ALP	9.33%
Glass House	Carolyn Male	ALP	9.58%
Whitsunday	Jan Jarratt	ALP	9.58%
Safe
Springwood	Barbara Stone	ALP	10.37%
Southport	Peter Lawlor	ALP	10.84%
Mulgrave	Warren Pitt	ALP	11.29% v ONP
Mundingburra	Peter Lawlor	ALP	11.38%
Albert	Margaret Keech	ALP	12.65% v ONP
Stretton	Stephen Robertson	ALP	12.66%
Mackay	Tim Mulherin	ALP	13.52%
Greenslopes	Gary Fenlon	ALP	14.09%
Mount Gravatt	Judy Spence	ALP	14.17%
Currumbin	Merri Rose	ALP	14.55%
Capalaba	Michael Choi	ALP	14.62% v IND
Cairns	Desley Boyle	ALP	14.82%
Bundaberg	Nita Cunningham	ALP	14.90%
Ashgrove	Jim Fouras	ALP	15.03%
Chatsworth	Terry Mackenroth	ALP	15.15%
Pumicestone	Carryn Sullivan	ALP	16.10%
Mount Coot-tha	Wendy Edmond	ALP	16.12%
Mount Isa	Tony McGrady	ALP	16.23% v ONP
Cleveland	Darryl Briskey	ALP	16.66%
Ipswich	Rachel Nolan	ALP	16.76% v ONP
Fitzroy	Jim Pearce	ALP	17.18%
Everton	Rod Welford	ALP	17.46%
Redcliffe	Ray Hollis	ALP	17.61%
Waterford	Tom Barton	ALP	18.01% v ONP
Very Safe
Ferny Grove	Geoff Wilson	ALP	20.54%
Woodridge	Desley Scott	ALP	21.08% v ONP
Murrumba	Dean Wells	ALP	21.12%
Kallangur	Ken Hayward	ALP	21.37%
Inala	Henry Palaszczuk	ALP	21.46% v IND
Yeerongpilly	Matt Foley	ALP	22.18%
Logan	John Mickel	ALP	22.28%
Stafford	Terry Sullivan	ALP	22.39%
Algester	Karen Struthers	ALP	22.63%
Kurwongbah	Linda Lavarch	ALP	22.70%
Cook	Steve Bredhauer	ALP	22.86% v ONP
Bulimba	Pat Purcell	ALP	23.22%
Rockhampton	Robert Schwarten	ALP	24.18%
Lytton	Paul Lucas	ALP	24.40%
Sandgate	Gordon Nuttall	ALP	24.47%
South Brisbane	Anna Bligh	ALP	24.93%
Brisbane Central	Peter Beattie	ALP	24.96%
Nudgee	Neil Roberts	ALP	25.13%
Bundamba	Jo-Ann Miller	ALP	30.91%

National/Liberal seats (15)
Marginal
Warrego	Howard Hobbs	NAT	0.30% v IND
Maroochydore	Fiona Simpson	NAT	0.79%
Moggill	David Watson	LIB	0.88%
Caloundra	Joan Sheldon	LIB	0.97%
Keppel	Vince Lester	NAT	1.46%
Callide	Jeff Seeney	NAT	2.32% v ONP
Hinchinbrook	Marc Rowell	NAT	2.77% v ONP
Mirani	Ted Malone	NAT	3.80%
Robina	Bob Quinn	LIB	4.03%
Beaudesert	Kev Lingard	NAT	5.09%
Surfers Paradise	Rob Borbidge	NAT	5.29%
Fairly Safe
Toowoomba South	Mike Horan	NAT	7.94%
Cunningham	Stuart Copeland	NAT	8.63%
Gregory	Vaughan Johnson	NAT	9.30%
Safe
Southern Downs	Lawrence Springborg	NAT	16.77%
Crossbench seats (8)
Maryborough	John Kingston	IND	0.50% v ALP
Darling Downs	Ray Hopper	IND	1.13% v NAT
Gympie	Elisa Roberts	ONP	3.26% v ALP
Gladstone	Liz Cunningham	IND	3.50% v ALP
Lockyer	Bill Flynn	ONP	7.30% v ALP
Tablelands	Rosa Lee Long	ONP	13.81% v ALP
Nanango	Dorothy Pratt	IND	17.07% v ALP
Nicklin	Peter Wellington	IND	23.43% v ONP

== Subsequent changes ==
- On 20 March 2001, former National Premier Rob Borbidge (Surfers Paradise) resigned. At the by-election on 5 May 2001, Independent Lex Bell won the seat.
- On 22 December 2001, Ray Hopper (Darling Downs) joined the National Party.
- On 18 April 2002, Elisa Roberts (Gympie) resigned from the One Nation Party and sat as an independent.
- On 24 March 2003, Independent John Kingston (Maryborough) resigned. At the by-election on 26 April 2003, Independent Chris Foley won the seat.

== See also ==
- Candidates of the Queensland state election, 2001
- Members of the Queensland Legislative Assembly, 1998–2001
- Members of the Queensland Legislative Assembly, 2001–2004
- Beattie Ministry
