= One Nation Queensland =

One Nation – Queensland Pauline Hanson's One Nation Queensland Division
- Abbreviation: One Nation; ONP
- Leader: James Ashby
- Founders: Pauline Hanson; David Ettridge; David Oldfield
- Founded: 1997; 29 years ago
- Registered: 1997; 2001; 2011
- Merged into: City Country Alliance (1999–2003) (Note: The City Country Alliance (CCA) was a party created by Queensland MPs that defected from the Queensland branch of One Nation in 1999.)
- Headquarters: Pinkenba, Brisbane, Queensland
- Membership (2009): <1,000 (claimed)
- Ideology: Hansonism; Conservatism; Right-wing populism
- Political position: Right-wing to far-right
- National affiliation: One Nation
- Colours: Orange; Blue
- Legislative Assembly: 0 / 93
- House of Representatives: 0 / 30 (Queensland seats)
- Senate: 2 / 12 (Queensland seats)
- Local Government: 1 / 562 (2024)

Website
- qld.onenation.org.au

One Nation – Queensland, sometimes referred to as One Nation Qld, and officially named Pauline Hanson's One Nation Queensland Division, is the Queensland branch of Pauline Hanson's One Nation. As of 2026 it holds extra-parliamentary status at the state level and two of the state's twelve senate seats.

== Background and history ==
=== 1990s ===
The One Nation party was formally established on 11 April 1997 at the Civic Hall in Ipswich, South East Queensland. Eight months later, in December, the party was officially registered in the state under the Electoral Act 1992. Following registration polling figures began to surge for the party – being polled at 5% in the January/March 1998 poll and rising to 15% by the end of May. In the June election, One Nation won over 22% of votes (439,121) and eleven seats in the Legislative Assembly. With nearly 23% of the vote, One Nation gained a higher percentage of the vote than any other third party (i.e. not Labor or the Coalition) at the state or territory level since Federation. This was also the only election at which a third party gained more votes than both the Liberal Party and the National Party considered separately.

One Nation's success at the 1998 state election, argued Rae Wear in The Rise and Fall of One Nation, was a culmination of years of corruption, movement toward the centre, and abandonment of populism from the ruling Queensland Nationals. This led to a vacuum on the right, and a reaction to it, which One Nation succeeded in filling. The views, style and success politically of the party, both state and federal, lead to Pauline Hanson being compared to figures such as former conservative Queensland Premier Joh Bjelke-Petersen; American conservative politician and commentator Pat Buchanan; and former French politician and leader of the National Front, Jean-Marie Le Pen.

In February 1999, five of the eleven One Nation MPs elected into the Legislative Assembly left the party and sat as Independents. In August 1999, the Queensland Supreme Court found that the party's registration was fraudulent. The Electoral Commission of Queensland (ECQ) subsequently de-registered the party. In December 1999, five of the remaining MPs elected into the Queensland Parliament for One Nation at the 1998 state election quit the party and formed the City Country Alliance (CCA).

=== 2000s ===
Just days prior to the close of electoral rolls for the 2001 state election, the party was re-registered. In the shortest permissible election campaign (26 days), One Nation received 8.7% of the vote on election day, and retained three seats. The 2001 election resulted in the biggest Labor landslide since 1935. During the campaign Labor had depicted the Liberal–National Coalition as being beholden to, and secretively controlled by, One Nation.

After losing two seats at the 2004 state election, the party largely became dormant. It held onto one seat in the following election (2006), having fielded a total of four candidates out of a possible 89 across the state. By the March 2009 state election the party fielded just two candidates and received fewer than 10,000 votes. By the end of the year, One Nation had been de-registered by the Electoral Commission (ECQ) with the party not meeting the 500-member threshold to maintain its registration status. State Secretary Rod Evans stated that the party would fight the decision in court, claiming the party had over 1,000 members. The party's claim was dismissed in court in January 2010 and the ECQ decision was upheld.

=== 2010s ===
By August 2011 the party had again regained registration with the goal of running in the 2012 state election.

In November 2014, Hanson announced that she had returned as One Nation leader, prior to the party's announcement, following support from One Nation party members. She announced that she would contest the seat of Lockyer in the 2015 Queensland state election. One Nation held the Queensland seat of Lockyer from 1998 to 2004. In February 2015, Hanson lost the seat by a narrow margin.

In January 2017 Liberal National MP for Buderim and former Newman cabinet (2012–2015) minister, Steve Dickson, defected to One Nation. Dickson stated his joining to the party was out of "sheer frustration" because he did not want to be a "yes person" for the major parties and also cited an amnesty for medicinal cannabis users to save children's lives. LNP Leader (and Leader of the Opposition) Tim Nicholls accused Dickson of acting out of self-interest. Upon defection Dickson became the first One Nation MP in over eight years. The same month (January) Dickson was announced as the party's new leader. Just a week later Dickson was joined by former LNP member for Logan, Michael Pucci. The party began to soar in the polls. In the following month (February) One Nation hit 23% of primary vote polling, up from 16% in the previous poll three months earlier. The polling suggested that One Nation could pick up more than 20 seats in the Legislative Assembly and hold the balance of power. However the party's election polling steadily declined in the lead-up to the 2017 state election and dropped to 13% by election day. At the 2017 state election the party achieved its biggest result since their first election campaign in 1997/98. Fielding sixty-one candidates at the election, One Nation won over 13% of the vote, including the Central Queensland seat of Mirani.

In 2019 party leader Steve Dickson resigned from the party after a three-year Al Jazeera English investigation caught him (Steve Dickson § National Rifle Association scandal), alongside party official James Ashby, seeking to facilitate up to AU$20 million dollars in funding from the National Rifle Association of America (NRA), an American gun rights and lobbying group. In the investigation Dickson was shown visiting a strip club in Washington, D.C., which was reported by The Washington Post as the reason for Dickson's resignation.

=== 2020s ===
At the 2020 state election One Nation fielded the most candidates in its history at a Queensland state election. The party put forward ninety candidates in total, eleven more than the party's previous high in 1998, and was just three candidates short of contesting every seat at the election (93). Much of the campaign and social media display, albeit restricted, was centred around the governments response to, and actions taken during, the COVID-19 pandemic. Federal party leader Pauline Hanson threatened to take legal action over the state governments interstate border closure decision in May–June 2020 and received the backing of the Minister for Home Affairs Peter Dutton. Hanson later proclaimed Premier Annastacia Palaszczuk to be a dictator. An Australia Institute survey published in late May 2020 revealed that 78% of Queenslanders support state border closures, with One Nation voters showing the least support at 70%. At the state election One Nation recorded an almost 7% drop in support compared to the previous election, garnering 204,316 votes. One Nation comfortably held onto its seat of Mirani picked up at the previous election.

In August 2024, just 85 days ahead of the state election, the party's sole MP, Stephen Andrew (Mirani), left the party after being disendorsed as a candidate. It was alleged that Andrew had been contemplating joining Katter's Australian Party (KAP). The following month, Andrew became a member of the Katter's Australian Party, and was put forward as a candidate for his seat of Mirani. That same month, party official James Ashby was appointed party leader ahead of the following months state election. Ashby was involved in the party for years, having been Pauline Hanson's Chief of Staff since at least 2019. The party's historic high candidate nomination for 2020 was eclipsed for 2024, fielding a candidate in every seat (93), alongside Labor, the Liberal Nationals and the Greens. The party's main campaign policy was tackling youth crime, particularly in Townsville in the state's far north, and health. Despite an increase in vote share at the 2024 state election One Nation failed to win any seats.

== Ideology and policies ==
=== Ideology ===
One Nation, like its federal branch, is a conservative and right-wing. Although active in a state that is notably more conservative than the rest of the country, One Nation holds a distinct position on the left–right political spectrum. During the party's early years most of its support came from rural, conservative, blue-collar male voters that typically aligned with the state's National Party, as well as voters displeased with the two major parties. That support was largely due to the vacuum created by the National Party's incremental abandonment of there supposed ideological principles of agrarianism, populism and conservatism. One Nation has advocated for more provision to regional Queensland, which it views as being neglected, and even promised 'independence' for the state, without specifying any details. The party also holds protectionist beliefs: in the late 1990s One Nation opposed any privatisation of state assets that were income-producing, specifically the possible privatisation of Queensland TAB and electricity company Energex.

=== Policies ===
==== Aboriginal affairs ====
The party is opposed to renaming proposals of Queensland places into an Aboriginal language name and supports repealing the Path to Treaty Act 2023, declaring it "divisive."

==== Crime ====
On crime the party supports reviewing and amending bail laws; establishing a victim support program with counselling, legal and financial assistance; requiring young offenders to make restitution to victims as part of their rehabilitation, which may also involve the offender's family if the offender is a minor and parental neglect is demonstrated to be a contributing factor; and establishing facilities where intervention programs for at-risk youth can be based, starting with a re-purposed education facility on North Keppel Island.

==== Firearms ====
The party supports reforming Queensland firearm laws to be more supportive to firearm owners.

==== Parliament ====
One Nation's principal electoral policy is to reintroduce an upper house to make the Queensland Parliament bicameral again.

==== Renewable energy ====
One Nation is against subsidising renewable energy projects and infrastructure, stating that it would "rehabilitate prime agricultural land heavily impacted by renewable energy infrastructure, and protect this land from further intrusions." Former One Nation candidate for Gympie, Katy McCallum, campaigned against renewable energy projects ahead of the 2024 state election.

== Electoral results ==
Legislative Assembly

== Leaders ==
| No. | Leader | Took office | Left office | Tenure |
|---|---|---|---|---|
| 1 | Heather Hill | 21 May 1998 | 23 June 1998 | 1 month and 2 days |
| 2 | Bill Feldman | 23 June 1998 | 10 December 1999 | 1 year, 5 months and 17 days |
| 3 | Bill Flynn | 6 March 2001 | 7 February 2004 | 2 years, 11 months and 1 day |
| 4 | Steve Dickson | 24 January 2017 | 30 April 2019 | 2 years, 3 months and 7 days |
| 5 | James Ashby | 20 September 2024 | Incumbent | 2 years, 2 months and 1 day |

== Members of parliament ==
=== Current MPs ===
==== Federal Parliament ====
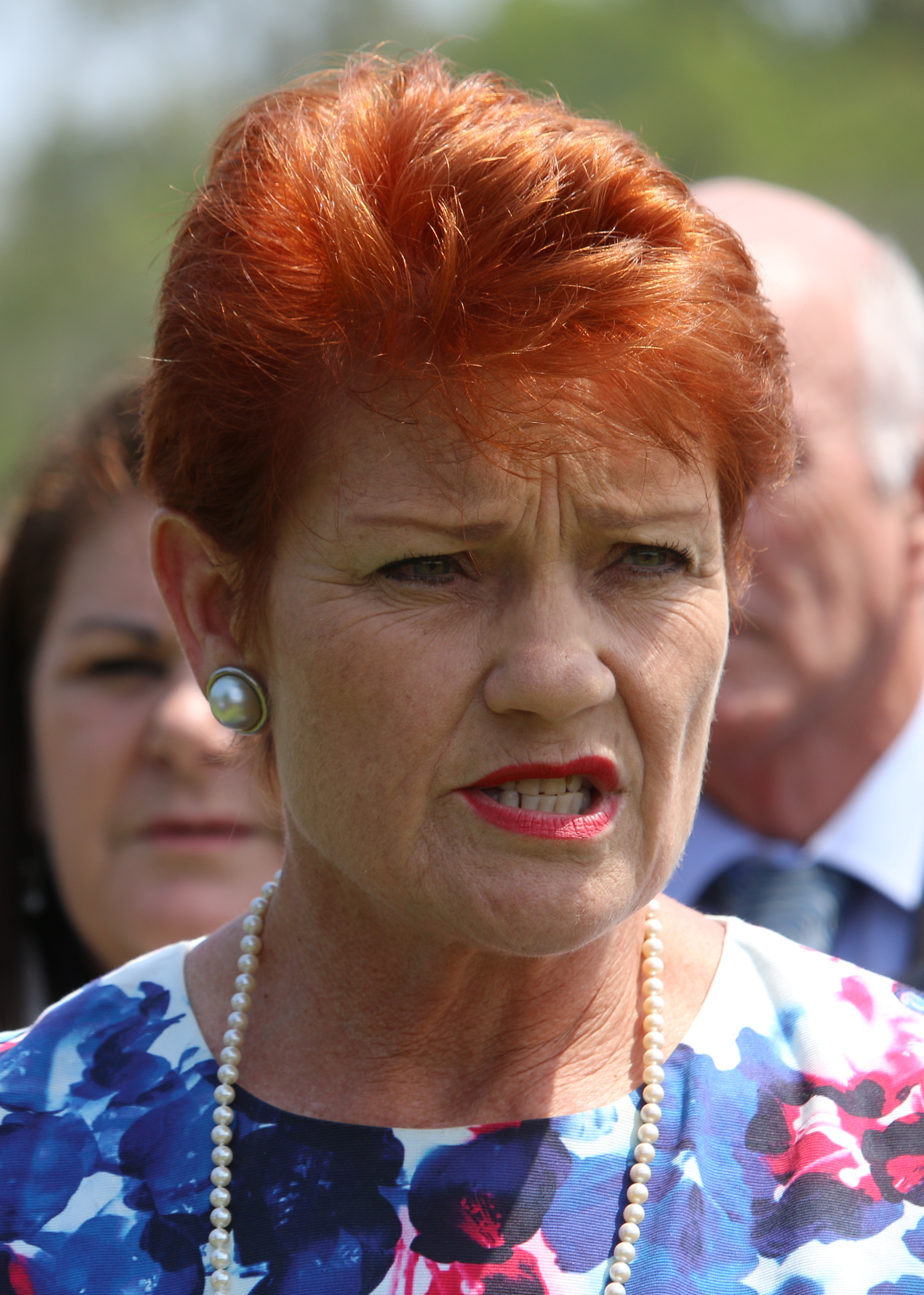
Senator Pauline Hanson, 2016–present; MP for Oxley (1997–1998)

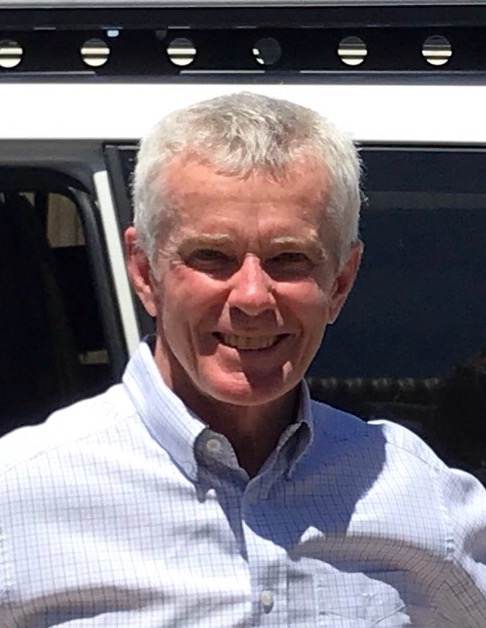
Senator Malcolm Roberts, 2016–2017, 2019–present

=== Former MPs ===
==== Federal Parliament ====
- Senator Heather Hill (1998–1999), elected in 1998 and retrospectively disqualified in 1999 after being found ineligible due to her dual citizenship
- Senator Len Harris (1999–2005), appointed after the disqualification of Heather Hill
- Senator Fraser Anning (2017–2017), appointed after the disqualification of Malcolm Roberts, Anning left the party the same day he was sworn in, later became an independent and then formed his own party Conservative National Party

==== State Parliament ====
List of former MPs
