= Prenzler =

Prenzler is a German surname. Notable people with the surname include:

- Olaf Prenzler (born 1958), East German sprinter
- Peter Prenzler (born 1952), Australian politician
