= Hetty Johnston =

Australian activist

Hetty Johnston AM
- Born: Hetty Margarete van Velsen; 27 September 1958 (age 67); Geelong, Victoria, Australia
- Known for: Child Protection Activism
- Title: Founder of Bravehearts
- Political party: Independent (since 2001)
- Other political affiliations: Democrats (1996–2001)

Hetty Margarete Johnston AM (born 27 September 1958), is the founder of Bravehearts Inc., an organisation advocating for better child protection in Australia. She remains a lobbyist who often highlights and promotes action against paedophilia within media, families, schools and in the general community.

Johnston has published a book detailing her beliefs called In the Best Interests of the Child.

== Politics ==
Johnston was the Australian Democrats candidate for Fadden at the 1996 federal election, and she was an independent Senate candidate for Queensland at the 2004 and 2019 federal election. At the 2001 Queensland state election, Johnston stood as an independent in the electorate of Springwood.

She ran for Mayor of Logan City in October 2015, but she withdrew to spend more time with her family. Johnston also unsuccessfully ran as an independent candidate for the seat of Macalister in the 2017 Queensland state election.

== Honours and awards ==
Johnston was appointed a Member of the Order of Australia (AM) in the Queen's Birthday Honours of 2014, for service to the community through a range of organisations promoting the welfare and rights of children. In 2015, she was named the Queensland Australian of the Year.
