= Heather Hill (politician) =

Australian politician (born 1960)

Senator-elect for Queensland
- In office 3 October 1998 – 23 June 1999
- Succeeded by: Len Harris

Leader of One Nation Queensland
- In office 21 May 1998 – 23 June 1998
- Deputy: Dolly Pratt
- Preceded by: Position established
- Succeeded by: Bill Feldman

Personal details
- Born: Heather Rafe; 9 August 1960 (age 66) London, England
- Party: Independent (since 2003); City Country Alliance (1999–2003); One Nation (1997–1999)
- Spouse: Ken Hill
- Children: 2

Heather Hill (née Rafe; born 9 August 1960) is an Australian former politician who served as the leader of One Nation in Queensland for one month in 1998. She was a senator-elect for Queensland from November 1998 until June 1999, when her election was declared invalid.

== Early life ==
Heather Rafe was born in 1960 in London. In 1971 her family moved to Australia, arriving in Brisbane, Queensland on 6 October of that year. She attended school in Brisbane. In January 1981, Heather Rafe married Ken Hill, an Australian citizen, with whom she would later have two children, Joshua and Hayley.

Hill was the manager of the Family Resource Centre in Ipswich for six years from 1991. The Liberal-National coalition government withdrew funding from the centre in 1997, spurring Hill to become involved with Pauline Hanson's One Nation Party.

=== Political career ===
Hill intended to stand for election, but to do so she had to be an Australian citizen. She applied for Australian citizenship in January 1998, which was granted on 20 January. She then attended a citizenship ceremony where she was presented with a certificate after reciting the pledge of loyalty to Australia. She also applied for an Australian passport. However, she needed to travel to New Zealand for family reasons on 4 February, and because her Australian passport had not arrived by then (it was issued only the previous day, 3 February), she used her British passport.

On 13 June 1998 Hill stood as the One Nation candidate for the Legislative Assembly of Queensland in the 1998 Queensland election, in the seat of Ipswich. She lost to Labor candidate David Hamill.

When the 1998 federal election was announced for 3 October, Hill was initially encouraged by Hanson to stand as the One Nation candidate for the House of Representatives in the Division of Oxley, but she declined. Instead she stood for the Senate in Queensland. Hill was the first of five One Nation candidates on the ballot paper, and she received 295,903 votes, enough to fill one quota (the required number of votes needed to be elected under the Single Transferable Vote system). Accordingly, she was declared a senator-elect, with her term due to commence on 1 July 1999.

=== Eligibility challenged ===
After the election, on 18 November 1998, concerns were raised about Hill's citizenship status. She still retained her United Kingdom citizenship, and had attained dual citizenship when her Australian citizenship was granted.

The Section 44 of the Constitution of Australia prevents anyone who is a citizen of a "foreign power" from being elected to the Parliament of Australia, and there were concerns that Hill's dual citizenship could contravene this provision. On 19 November she contacted the High Commission of the United Kingdom in Brisbane, and arranged to renounce her United Kingdom citizenship. However, on 30 November her election was challenged on the basis of her dual citizenship.

On 23 June 1999 the High Court of Australia, sitting in its capacity as the Court of Disputed Returns, decided in Sue v Hill, that Hill's election was invalid because, at the time of her election, she was still a citizen of the United Kingdom. The case clarified for the first time that the United Kingdom had become a power foreign to Australia.

== Aftermath ==
Len Harris, One Nation's number two candidate on the Senate ballot, was appointed in Hill's place, taking up his seat on 2 July 1999. Hill became Harris's advisor, having previously been appointed to One Nation's national executive. However, Hill fell out with the party after a dispute about its finances, having expressed her concern that A$2.4 million in funding was unaccounted for in financial documents. When the Queensland branch of the party defected from the national body, forming One Nation Queensland (later renamed the City Country Alliance), Hill joined them, and was sacked by Harris on 13 December 1999. The Alliance was de-registered in 2003.
