= Trevor Strong =

Australian politician (born 1961)

Member of the Queensland Legislative Assembly for Burnett
- In office 17 February 2001 – 7 February 2004
- Preceded by: Doug Slack
- Succeeded by: Rob Messenger

Personal details
- Born: Trevor Leonard Strong; 26 February 1961 (age 65) Sydney, New South Wales, Australia
- Party: Labor
- Occupation: Carpenter

Trevor Leonard Strong (born 26 February 1961) is a former Australian politician. He was a Labor member of the Legislative Assembly of Queensland from 2001 to 2004, representing the seat of Burnett.

Strong was a qualified carpenter before entering parliament. He is married and has four children. He was previously President of the Moore Park Branch of the ALP. He was elected to the seat of Burnett in Labor's landslide win in 2001, but was defeated at the next election in 2004. He has not returned to State politics. He was elected as a councillor on the Burnett Shire Council for the final term before amalgamation: 2004–2008. In 2008 he was unsuccessful as a candidate for the new Bundaberg Regional Council.

Parliament of Queensland
Preceded by Doug Slack	Member for Burnett; 2001–2004	Succeeded by Rob Messenger
