= Electoral district of Crows Nest =

Crows Nest Queensland—Legislative Assembly
- State: Queensland
- Created: 1992
- Abolished: 2001
- Namesake: Crows Nest, Queensland

Crows Nest was an electoral district of the Legislative Assembly in the Australian state of Queensland from 1992 to 2001.

The district took in rural areas in southern Queensland, centred on the town of Crows Nest.

== Members for Crows Nest ==
Member	Party	Term
Russell Cooper	National	1992–2001

== See also ==
- Electoral districts of Queensland
- Members of the Queensland Legislative Assembly by year
- Category:Members of the Queensland Legislative Assembly by name
