= Doug Slack =

Australian politician

Member of the Queensland Legislative Assembly for Burnett
- In office 1 November 1986 – 17 February 2001
- Preceded by: Claude Wharton
- Succeeded by: Trevor Strong

Personal details
- Born: Douglas John Slack; 5 April 1941 (age 85) Gayndah, Queensland, Australia
- Party: National Party
- Occupation: Businessman, farmer

Douglas John Slack (born 5 April 1941) is a former Australian politician. He was the National Party member for Burnett in the Legislative Assembly of Queensland from 1986 to 2001.

Slack was born in Gayndah, Queensland, and was a farmer and businessman before entering politics. He served on the Opposition front bench from 1990 to 1995, holding the portfolios of Family Servinces and Aboriginal and Islander Affairs and Treasury (1990–1992) and Environment and Heritage (1992–1996). From 1996 to 1998 he was Minister for Economic Development and Trade, and following the Coalition's return to Opposition he was Shadow Minister for State Development until his defeat in 2001.

Parliament of Queensland
| Preceded by Claude Wharton | Member for Burnett; 1986–2001 | Succeeded by Trevor Strong |
