= David Dalgleish =

Australian politician (born 1962)

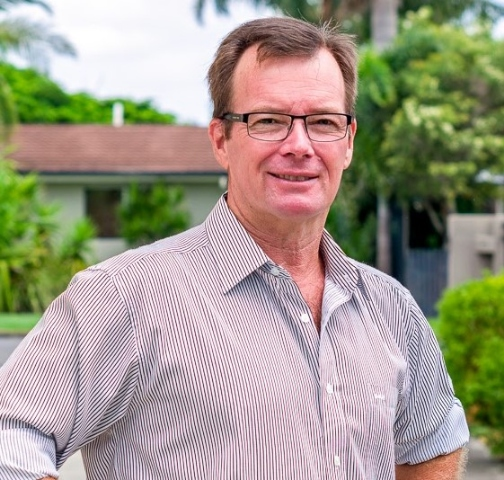
- Dalgleish, 2020

Member of the Queensland Legislative Assembly for Hervey Bay
- In office 13 June 1998 – 17 February 2001
- Preceded by: Bill Nunn
- Succeeded by: Andrew McNamara

Deputy Mayor of Fraser Coast
- In office 15 March 2008 – 28 April 2012
- Preceded by: New Council
- Succeeded by: Trevor McDonald

Fraser Coast Regional Councillor
- In office 15 March 2008 – 28 April 2012
- Preceded by: New Council
- Succeeded by: Trevor McDonald

Personal details
- Born: David Bruce Dalgleish; 13 October 1962 (age 64) Epping, Sydney, Australia
- Party: Katter's Australian Party (since 2013)
- Other political affiliations: One Nation (1997–1999); City Country Alliance (1999–2003
- Spouse: Maki Dalgleish
- Children: Mathew Dalgleish, Sean Dalgleish, Joshua Dalgleish
- Parent(s): Iris Dalgleish, Henry Dalgleish
- Occupation: Transport Company Owner/Operator (Self-employed); Power House Electrical Mechanics Assistant (Wide Bay–Burnett; Electricity Board)
- Profession: Tradesman; Businessman; Politician

David Bruce Dalgleish (born 13 October 1962) is a former Australian politician who served as the state member of Hervey Bay, a city councillor, and deputy mayor of the Fraser Coast region. Born in Epping, he was a licensed motor mechanic, welder and LPG fitter before entering politics, and owned a transport business. In 1998, he was elected to the Legislative Assembly of Queensland as a member of Pauline Hanson's One Nation, representing the seat of Hervey Bay. He remained in the party until December 1999, when he and the other remaining One Nation MPs formed the City Country Alliance under the leadership of Bill Feldman. He was the Alliance spokesman for Emergency Services, Transport and Main Roads, Housing and Public Works. In 2001, he was defeated by Andrew McNamara of the Labor Party.

Dalgleish was elected as one of 10 councillors for the newly created Fraser Coast Region in 2008, which was initially undivided. He contested the newly created Division 6 in 2012, however was not successful. He again contested Division 6 in 2020 and came second on first preference votes, however was ultimately unsuccessful once preferences were distributed, finishing the official count with 48.14%.

At the 2013 federal election, Dalgleish contested the seat of Hinkler for the Australian Party, finishing fourth with 4.58% of the vote.

== Electoral History ==
Queensland Legislative Assembly
Election year	Electorate	Party	Votes	FP%	+/-	2PP%	+/-	Result
1998	Hervey Bay	ONP	8,584	33.80	▲33.80	55.30	▲55.30	First
2001	Hervey Bay	CCA	4,193	18.50	▲18.50	N/A	N/A	Third
2004	Hervey Bay	Ind	3,250	12.60	▲12.60	N/A	N/A	Third

Australian House of Representatives
Election year	Electorate	Party	Votes	FP%	+/-	2PP%	+/-	Result
2001	Wide Bay	Ind	3,192	4.35	▲4.35	N/A	N/A	Fifth
2013	Hinkler	KAP	3,887	4.58	▲4.58	N/A	N/A	Fourth

Fraser Coast Regional Council
Election year	Electorate	Party	Votes	FP%	+/-	2PP%	+/-	Result
2008	Undivided	Ind	23,159	4.74	▲4.74	N/A	N/A	Elected
2012	Division 6	Ind	1,552	29.47	▲29.47	32.51	▲32.51	Second
2018	Mayor	Ind	7,686	12.80	▲12.80	N/A	N/A	Fourth
2020	Division 6	Ind	1,414	25.69	▲25.69	48.14	▲48.14	Second

Parliament of Queensland
Preceded by Bill Nunn	Member for Hervey Bay; 1998–2001	Succeeded by Andrew McNamara
