= Bill Flynn (Australian politician) =

Australian politician

Bill Flynn NM

Member of the Queensland Legislative Assembly for Lockyer
- In office 17 February 2001 – 7 February 2004
- Preceded by: Peter Prenzler
- Succeeded by: Ian Rickuss

Leader of One Nation Queensland
- In office 6 March 2001 – 7 February 2004
- Deputy: Rosa Lee Long
- Preceded by: Bill Feldman
- Succeeded by: Rosa Lee Long

Personal details
- Born: William Bond Ingpen Flynn; 9 October 1951 Dorset, England, United Kingdom
- Died: 23 April 2011 (aged 59) Brisbane, Queensland, Australia
- Party: One Nation
- Occupation: Police officer (Queensland Police)
- Profession: Public servant Politician
- Awards: National Medal

Military service
- Allegiance: United Kingdom (1977–1983); Australia (1983–2001)
- Branch/service: British Army (1977–1977); Hampshire Constabulary (1977–1983); Queensland Police Service (1983–2001)
- Years of service: 1977–2001
- Rank: Private (BA); Constable (HC); Constable (QPS)
- Unit: Special Air Service (BA)

William Bond Ingpen Flynn (9 October 1951 – 23 April 2011) was an Australian politician. Born in Dorset, United Kingdom, he served as a British police officer for six years before he became an Australian citizen in 1984. He remained a policeman, serving in Brisbane, Beenleigh, Woodridge, Oxley and Beaudesert. In 2000, he was presented with a National Medal.

In 2001, Flynn was elected to the Legislative Assembly of Queensland as the member for Lockyer, representing Pauline Hanson's One Nation. He was elected leader of the parliamentary party in March 2001, shortly after the election. The resignation of Elisa Roberts from the party left Flynn with only one colleague, Rosa Lee Long. In the 2004 election, he defended his seat of Lockyer but lost it to National Party candidate Ian Rickuss, leaving Lee Long as One Nation's last MP. He unsuccessfully contested the seat of Oxley in the 2004 federal election.

Flynn died suddenly after a collapse on 23 April 2011.

Parliament of Queensland
Preceded by Peter Prenzler	Member for Lockyer; 2001–2004	Succeeded by Ian Rickuss
