= Jack Paff =

Australian politician

Member of the Queensland Legislative Assembly for Ipswich West
- In office 13 June 1998 – 17 February 2001
- Preceded by: Don Livingstone
- Succeeded by: Don Livingstone

Personal details
- Born: Jack Kelvin Paff; 11 May 1938 (age 88) Taree, New South Wales, Australia
- Party: City Country Alliance (1999–2003)
- Other political affiliations: One Nation (1997–1999)
- Occupation: Police officer (Queensland Police); Chief stationmaster (New South Wales Government Railways)
- Profession: Public servant Politician

Jack Kelvin Paff (born 11 May 1938) is a former Australian politician.

== Early life ==
Paff was born in Taree, New South Wales. He served in the Citizens Military Force and rose to the position of sergeant. He was a stationmaster with New South Wales Government Railways and then served in the Queensland Police Force.

== Politics ==
In 1998, Paff was elected to the Legislative Assembly of Queensland as a member of Pauline Hanson's One Nation, representing the seat of Ipswich West. He remained in One Nation until December 1999, when he and the other One Nation MPs left the party to form the City Country Alliance under the leadership of Bill Feldman. Paff continued as party whip for the new grouping, and was the spokesperson for Law (Attorney-General), Justice and the Arts, Communication and Information, Local Government and Planning, Regional and Rural Communities, State Development and Trade. He was defeated in 2001 by Labor's Don Livingstone, whom Paff had defeated in 1998.

In 2017, aged 79 years, Paff unsuccessfully contested the Ipswich mayoral by-election.

Parliament of Queensland
Preceded by Don Livingstone	Member for Ipswich West; 1998–2001	Succeeded by Don Livingstone
