= Peter Prenzler =

Australian politician (born 1952)

Member of the Queensland Legislative Assembly for Lockyer
- In office 13 June 1998 – 17 February 2001
- Preceded by: Tony FitzGerald
- Succeeded by: Bill Flynn

Deputy Leader of One Nation Queensland
- In office 6 February 1999 – 22 April 2003
- Leader: Bill Feldman
- Preceded by: Dorothy Pratt
- Succeeded by: Rosa Lee Long

Personal details
- Born: Peter Ross Prenzler; 3 April 1952 (age 74) Boonah, Queensland, Australia
- Party: City Country Alliance (1999–2003)
- Other political affiliations: One Nation (1997–1999)
- Occupation: Veterinary surgeon (Self–employed)

Peter Ross Prenzler (born 3 April 1952) is an Australian former politician. Born in Boonah, he served in the Royal Australian Artillery and the Citizens Military Force 1969–1971. He was a veterinary surgeon at Kalbar before entering politics. In 1998, he was elected to the Legislative Assembly of Queensland as a member of Pauline Hanson's One Nation, representing the seat of Lockyer. He remained in the party until December 1999, when he and the other One Nation MPs left the party to form the City Country Alliance, of which Prenzler became deputy leader. In addition to the deputy leadership, he held the position of spokesperson for Health, Primary Industries, Aboriginal and Torres Strait Islander Policy, Natural Resources, Environment and Heritage, Fair Trading and Women's Policy. He contested the 2001 state election but was defeated by One Nation candidate Bill Flynn.

Parliament of Queensland
Preceded by Tony FitzGerald	Member for Lockyer; 1998–2001	Succeeded by Bill Flynn
