= City Country Alliance =

Former political party in Australia

- Leader: Bill Feldman
- Deputy Leader: Peter Prenzler
- Executive Director: Ian Petersen
- Founded: 1999; 27 years ago
- Registered: 12 September 2000; 26 years ago
- Dissolved: 22 April 2003; 23 years ago
- Split from: One Nation
- Ideology: Australian nationalism Hansonism; Social conservatism
- Political position: Right-wing

The City Country Alliance (CCA), initially known as One Nation Queensland, was a short-lived Australian political party, operating exclusively in Queensland, that briefly held six Queensland state parliamentary seats. It was founded in the wake of Pauline Hanson's One Nation experiencing severe ructions in Queensland, the home state of founder Pauline Hanson.

One Nation had made a surprisingly good showing at the 1998 state election, winning 11 seats in the Legislative Assembly of Queensland. However, in 1999, five MLAs seceded to sit as independents, in protest at the centralisation of party affairs in Sydney, costing One Nation official status in the legislature. Amid delays in the Supreme Court of Queensland acting on an appeal of One Nation's deregistration in Queensland, the five remaining One Nation MLAs tried to register a separate Queensland party. When party headquarters declared it a mutiny, they announced formation of One Nation QLD as a separate party. The party later changed its name to the City Country Alliance.

Its inaugural parliamentary leader was former One Nation state leader Bill Feldman, and its executive director was Ian Petersen. A sixth member, Jeff Knuth, subsequently joined, and was later followed by former Senator-elect Heather Hill.

On 12 September 2000, the party became lawfully registered, but it had already showed signs of collapse before winning formal registration. Its website had not been updated since 24 March 2000.

The party was also registered with the Western Australian Electoral Commission. It did not run in any elections in the state.

On 17 February 2001, the party contested the Queensland state election, winning only 2.39% of the primary vote, and losing all of its seats. On 22 April 2003, the party lost its official status after the Australian Electoral Commission determined it no longer had the right to hold it.

== Members of Parliament ==
- 1999–2001
  - Harry Black MLA (Whitsunday)
  - David Dalgleish MLA (Hervey Bay)
  - Bill Feldman MLA (Caboolture)
  - Jack Paff MLA (Ipswich West)
  - Peter Prenzler MLA (Lockyer)
- 2000–2001
  - Jeff Knuth MLA (Burdekin)
