= Dorothy Pratt =

Australian politician

Dorothy Pratt JP

Member of the Queensland Legislative Assembly for Nanango
- In office 17 February 2001 – 23 March 2012
- Preceded by: Constituency established
- Succeeded by: Deb Frecklington

Member of the Queensland Legislative Assembly for Barambah
- In office 13 June 1998 – 17 February 2001
- Preceded by: Trevor Perrett
- Succeeded by: Constituency abolished

Deputy Leader of One Nation Queensland
- In office 13 June 1998 – 6 February 1999
- Leader: Heather Hill
- Preceded by: Bill Feldman
- Succeeded by: Peter Prenzler

Personal details
- Born: 11 March 1955 (age 71) Coffs Harbour, New South Wales, Australia
- Party: Independent (since 1999)
- Other political affiliations: One Nation (1997–1999)
- Occupation: Justice of the Peace (Government of Queensland); Restaurant proprietor (Self-employed)
- Profession: Public servant Businesswoman; Politician

Dorothy Ruth "Dolly" Pratt (born 11 March 1955) is an Australian politician. Born in Coffs Harbour, New South Wales, she was a Justice of the Peace and coffee shop proprietor in Queensland before entering politics. She also worked at cattle sale yards. At the 1998 state election, she won the seat of Barambah in the Legislative Assembly of Queensland, representing Pauline Hanson's One Nation. She left One Nation in 1999 to sit as an independent. In 2001, her seat of Barambah was abolished and largely replaced with Nanango, which she won as an independent. Pratt was re-elected in 2004, 2006 and 2009. Pratt stood down at the 2012 election. She is married with three children.

Parliament of Queensland
Preceded by Trevor Perrett	Member for Barambah; 1998–2001	Abolished
New seat	Member for Nanango; 2001–2012	Succeeded by Deb Frecklington
