= Bill Feldman =

Australian politician

Sergeant Bill Feldman

Member of the Queensland Police Union Council for Central Queensland
- Incumbent
- Assumed office 9 July 2009
- President: Ian Leavers
- Preceded by: Mark Ballin

Leader of City Country Alliance
- In office 13 December 1999 – 22 April 2003
- Deputy: Peter Prenzler
- Preceded by: Party established
- Succeeded by: Party abolished

Leader of One Nation Queensland
- In office 23 June 1998 – 13 December 1999
- Deputy: Dorothy Pratt; Peter Prenzler
- Preceded by: Heather Hill
- Succeeded by: Bill Flynn

Member of the Queensland Legislative Assembly for Caboolture
- In office 13 June 1998 – 17 February 2001
- Preceded by: Jon Sullivan
- Succeeded by: Electorate abolished

Personal details
- Born: William Patrick Feldman; 22 February 1958 (age 68) Kingaroy, Queensland, Australia
- Party: One Nation (1997–1999); City Country Alliance (1999–2003)
- Spouse: Gail Feldman (m. 1978)
- Children: 2, including Luke

William Patrick Feldman (born 22 February 1958) is a former Australian politician and police officer. Feldman served as a Member of the Queensland Legislative Assembly for Caboolture from 1998 to 2001. During his time in office, he briefly served as the Leader of One Nation Queensland from 1998 to 1999, and afterwards was the Leader of City Country Alliance from 1999 to 2003. After his legislative career, Feldman has served as an officer in the police, and in 2009 became a Member of the Queensland Police Union's Council for Central Queensland.

== Early life ==
Born in Kingaroy, Queensland, Feldman was a police officer before entering politics, working closely with David Dalgleish, having attained the rank of sergeant in 1994.

== Career ==
In 1998, he was elected to the Legislative Assembly of Queensland as a member of Pauline Hanson's One Nation, representing the seat of Caboolture. He was the parliamentary leader until December 1999, when he led his remaining colleagues out of One Nation to form the City Country Alliance, of which he became leader. His seat was abolished in 2001 and he contested its replacement, Pumicestone, but was defeated by Labor's Carryn Sullivan, whose husband Jon Sullivan Feldman had defeated in Caboolture in 1998. Feldman did not continue his political career, and instead returned to the police force.

Upon retiring, he returned to policing in Greenvale, near Townsville. Then, from 2007 to 2009, he was the officer in charge at Marian police station. However, wishing to return to politics, he became the Queensland Police Union of Employees executive member for the Central Region. He won the position from Mark Ballin, who led Theodore police station, and had been the executive member for 12 years prior. As a QPUE executive member, in 2009, he promised to monitor police staffing levels in Mackway and negotiate for a new police Enterprise Bargaining Agreement with the government. In 2011, he announced he would run as a candidate for Queensland Police Union President. He announced that his law-and-order stance would make him the right person for the union to be more militant, challenging incumbent Ian Leavers.

== Personal life ==
On 7 May 1978 he had married Gail, with whom he has two children, Dannielle and Luke.

Feldman's son Luke Feldman is a professional cricketer, playing for the Queensland Bulls, Hobart Hurricanes and Sydney Sixers.

Parliament of Queensland
Preceded by Jon Sullivan	Member for Caboolture; 1998–2001	Abolished
