= Candidates of the 1998 Queensland state election =

The 1998 Queensland state election was held on 13 June 1998.

== By-elections ==
- On 3 February 1996, Frank Tanti (Liberal) was elected to succeed Ken Davies (Labor), who had been unseated by the Court of Disputed Returns on 8 December 1995, as the member for Mundingburra.
- On 5 October 1996, Paul Lucas (Labor) was elected to succeed Tom Burns (Labor), who resigned on 16 May 1996, as the member for Lytton.
- On 24 May 1997, Linda Lavarch (Labor) was elected to succeed Margaret Woodgate (Labor), who resigned on 17 March 1997, as the member for Kurwongbah.

== Retiring Members ==
=== Labor ===
- Len Ardill MLA (Archerfield)
- Clem Campbell MLA (Bundaberg)
- Keith De Lacy MLA (Cairns)
- Wayne Goss MLA (Logan)
- Glen Milliner MLA (Ferny Grove)
- Geoff Smith MLA (Townsville)

=== National ===
- Di McCauley MLA (Callide)
- Mark Stoneman MLA (Burdekin)

== Legislative Assembly ==
Sitting members are shown in bold text. Successful candidates are highlighted in the relevant colour. Where there is possible confusion, an asterisk (*) is also used.

Electorate	Held by	Labor candidate	Coalition candidate	One Nation candidate	Greens candidate	Democrats candidate	Other candidates
Albert	National	Peter Shooter	**Bill Baumann** (Nat)	Rod Evans	Sally Spain		Lyn Green (ARP)
Archerfield	Labor	Karen Struthers	Fazal Deen (Lib)	Rodger Pryor	Rocco De Pierri		Allen Hrstich (ARP)
Ashgrove	Labor	**Jim Fouras**	Alan Sherlock (Lib)		Brenda Mason	Justin Yeend	Ray Sargent (AFP)
Aspley	Liberal	Steve Davey	**John Goss** (Lib)	Ron Eaton	Alison Green	Bruce Kent	Tony Argent (ARP)
Barambah	National	Michael Crook	**Trevor Perrett** (Nat)	Dorothy Pratt			Peter Hayden (Ind); Steve Jeffery (Ind); Rod Morgan (AFP)
Barron River	Liberal	Lesley Clark	**Lyn Warwick** (Lib)	Peter Starr	Denis Walls	Lisa Golding	Steve Dimitriou (Ind)
Beaudesert	National	Michael De Lacy	**Kev Lingard** (Nat)	Gordon Wadsworth	Bill Livermore		Ian Dillon (Ind); Nick Duke (AFP); Don Green (ARP); Vin McNamara (Shooters)
Brisbane Central	Labor	**Peter Beattie**	Tony Gleeson (Lib)	John Beattie	Richard Nielsen	Nicky Jones	Graham Matthews (Ind)
Broadwater	National	Bob Brown	**Allan Grice** (Nat)	Rosita Petch	Marie Robb		
Bulimba	Labor	**Pat Purcell**	Marjorie Threapleton (Lib)	Nigel Gibson	Greg George	Mark Ault	Wayne Jenkins (ARP)
Bundaberg	Labor	Nita Cunningham	David Porter (Nat)	Bernard Barry	Ray Pearce	Lance Hall	
Bundamba	Labor	**Bob Gibbs**	Jeff Matijasevic (Lib)	Colene Hughes	John McKeon	Andre Klingbeil	
Burdekin	National	Les Walker	Terry Morato (Nat)	Jeff Knuth		Maurie Nichols	Elaine Steley (AFP)
Burleigh	National	Michael Lennon	**Judy Gamin** (Nat)	Terry Sharples	David Byerlee		
Burnett	National	Greg McMahon	**Doug Slack** (Nat)	Glen Onoprienko	Christine Kret		Richard Smith (Ind)
Caboolture	Labor	**Jon Sullivan**	Peter Lacey (Nat)	Bill Feldman		Liz Oss-Emer	Bill Newton (Ind); Brian O'Grady (ARP)
Cairns	Labor	Desley Boyle	Myles Thompson (Lib)	Peter Boniface	Jonathan Metcalfe		Nev Bates (Ind)
Callide	National	Gary Barton	Jeff Seeney (Nat)	Chris Savage			Dolores Fowler (AFP)
Caloundra	Liberal	Donald Wilson	**Joan Sheldon** (Lib)	Bronwyn Boag	Louise Peach		John Goldsworthy (AFP)
Capalaba	Labor	**Jim Elder**	Richard Ferrett (Lib)		Julie-Anne O'Donohue		David Exelby (Ind)
Charters Towers	National	Christine Scott	**Rob Mitchell** (Nat)	Richard O'Pray			Ben Dyball (ARP); Peter Salisbury (Shooters)
Chatsworth	Labor	**Terry Mackenroth**	Bruce Martin (Lib)	Brian Annear-Walker	Clare Rudkin		
Chermside	Labor	**Terry Sullivan**	Zenia Belcher (Lib)	Hazel Walsh		John Lambert	Noel Otto (ARP)
Clayfield	Liberal	Liddy Clark	**Santo Santoro** (Lib)		Malcolm Lewis	Michael Brown	
Cleveland	Labor	**Darryl Briskey**	Damien Massingham (Lib)	Bluey Bostock		Jenny Van Rooyen	Barry Archie (ARP); Phil Ball (Ind)
Cook	Labor	**Steve Bredhauer**	Terry Cranwell (Nat)	Carmel Williams			Smiley Burnett (ARP); Edgar Williams (Ind)
Crows Nest	National	Fiona Bucknall	**Russell Cooper** (Nat)	David Cockburn	John Langford		Brenda Moloney (ARP)
Cunningham	National	Jackie Trad	**Tony Elliott** (Nat)	Sherry Passfield			Ken Davies (Ind); Bill Ison (ARP); Anne Smeaton (Ind)
Currumbin	Labor	**Merri Rose**	Warrick Coleborne (Lib); Sue Robbins (Nat)	Paul Boyle	John Palmer		Mick Gay (Ind)
Everton	Labor	**Rod Welford**	Karen Jones (Lib)	Ken Brady		Brett Matthews	
Ferny Grove	Labor	Geoff Wilson	Ashley Manicaros (Lib)	Kevin John	Mark Taylor	Suzanne Lawson	
Fitzroy	Labor	**Jim Pearce**	Richie Bills (Nat)	Joan Wilson		Peter Cvetko-Lueger	Christopher Chatham (AFP)
Gladstone	Independent	Leo Zussino	Paul Ford (Nat)				**Liz Cunningham** (Ind)
Greenslopes	Liberal	Gary Fenlon	**Ted Radke** (Lib)		Libby Connors	John Cherry	Paul Feeney (ARP); Nigel Freemarijuana (Ind); Jenny Hughey (AWP)
Gregory	National	Donna O'Donoghue	**Vaughan Johnson** (Nat)	Allan Bahr		Rebecca Hack	Ron Crozier (AFP); Frank Taylor (Shooters)
Gympie	National	David Warren	**Len Stephan** (Nat)	Ian Petersen	Chris Gwin		
Hervey Bay	Labor	**Bill Nunn**	Scott McLay (Nat)	David Dalgleish	Bob Borsellino	Phil Rodhouse	
Hinchinbrook	National	Richard Barkas	**Marc Rowell** (Nat)	John Wyllie			Teresa Roveda (AFP)
Inala	Labor	**Henry Palaszczuk**	Philip Greenaway (Lib)		Lenore Taylor	Lyn Dengate	Xuan Thu Nguyen (Ind)
Indooroopilly	Liberal	Anne Stuart	**Denver Beanland** (Lib)		Drew Hutton	Mary McIntyre	
Ipswich	Labor	**David Hamill**	Steve Wilson (Lib)	Heather Hill	Desiree Mahoney		Peter Morris (ARP)
Ipswich West	Labor	**Don Livingstone**	Sue Wykes (Nat)	Jack Paff			Lance Schloss (ARP)
Kallangur	Labor	**Ken Hayward**	Scott Driscoll (Lib)	Boyd Nimmo	Noel Hoffman		Peter Birt (Ind); Howard Shepherd (CDP); Allan Taylor (ARP)
Kedron	Labor	**Paul Braddy**	Cynthia Harris (Lib)	Joan Gordon		Elizabeth Rowland	Kay Spence (Ind)
Keppel	National	Bruce Saunders	**Vince Lester** (Nat)	Wendy McFarlane		Terry Clark	Toni Hansen (Ind); Glenda Mather (Ind); Rick Nagle (AFP)
Kurwongbah	Labor	**Linda Lavarch**	Justin Kerr (Lib)	Kim Thistlethwaite	Kim Pantano		
Lockyer	National	Dan O'Brien	**Tony Fitzgerald** (Nat)	Peter Prenzler			Patricia Andrew (Shooters); Tony Howard (ARP); Jim McDonald (Ind)
Logan	Labor	John Mickel	James Lister (Nat)	Jan Dawson		Alan Dickson	Russell Leneham (Ind)
Lytton	Labor	**Paul Lucas**	Tony Murphy (Lib)		Rob Wilson	Marianne Dickie	
Mackay	Labor	**Tim Mulherin**	Marcella Massie (Nat)	Barry Evans			Mike Ettridge (Ind)
Mansfield	Liberal	Phil Reeves	**Frank Carroll** (Lib)	Michael Harris-Gahan	Scott Alderson	Faye Carrington	
Maroochydore	National	Dan Siskind	**Fiona Simpson** (Nat)	Cheryl Parker	John Fitzgerald	Gaylene Bell	
Maryborough	Labor	**Bob Dollin**	Kevin Mahoney (Nat)	John Kingston	Sue Russell		
Merrimac	Liberal	Robert Poole	**Bob Quinn** (Lib)	John Fairfax		Colin O'Brien	
Mirani	National	Barry Gomersall	**Ted Malone** (Nat)	Edward Vaughan			Lawrence Hewitt (AFP); Steve Purtill (Shooters)
Moggill	Liberal	Laurie Lumsden	**David Watson** (Lib)		Brett Sloan	Kirsty Fraser	
Mooloolah	Liberal	Marc Zande	**Bruce Laming** (Lib)	Roy Schell	Nicholas Redmond		
Mount Coot-tha	Labor	**Wendy Edmond**	Rolene Orford (Lib)		Dick Copeman	Alison Jensen	
Mount Gravatt	Labor	**Judy Spence**	Graham Quirk (Lib)	Richard Duffell	Rod Young	Ian Laing	Arthur Colebrook (ARP)
Mount Isa	Labor	**Tony McGrady**	Bill Baldwin (Nat)	Malcolm MacDonald			Ian Inglis (Shooters); Shirleen Webber (ARP)
Mount Ommaney	Liberal	Julie Attwood	**Bob Harper** (Lib)	Allan Gregory	Helen King	Natalia Infield	Peter Pyke (Ind); John Tiplady (Ind)
Mulgrave	National	Warren Pitt	**Naomi Wilson** (Nat)	Charles Rappolt		Jo Gallo	
Mundingburra	Liberal	Lindy Nelson-Carr	**Frank Tanti** (Lib)	Trevor Elson			
Murrumba	Labor	**Dean Wells**	Susan Haskell (Lib)	Tony Cleaver		Peter Kennedy	Mark Lewry (ARP)
Nerang	Liberal	Peter Burke	**Ray Connor** (Lib)	John Coyle	Jacquie Hughes	Lynne Grimsey	Richard Balcke (ARP)
Nicklin	National	Coleen Giles	**Neil Turner** (Nat)	Santo Ferraro		Geoff Armstrong	Peter Wellington (Ind)
Noosa	Liberal	Don Sfiligoj	**Bruce Davidson** (Lib)	David Summers	Peter Sykes		John Jones (Ind); Robert Logan (Ind); Eddie Taylor (CDP)
Nudgee	Labor	**Neil Roberts**	Paul Varley (Lib)	Wayne Whitney	Mike Stasse		Keith Lane (ARP)
Redcliffe	Labor	**Ray Hollis**	Allan Sutherland (Lib)	Phil Knight			Terry Fleming (ARP); Bill Turner (Ind)
Redlands	National	John Budd	**John Hegarty** (Nat)	June Woodward		Graham Jenkin	Don Ruwoldt (ARP)
Rockhampton	Labor	**Robert Schwarten**	Karen Mackay (Nat)	Len Timms		Fay Lawrence	
Sandgate	Labor	**Gordon Nuttall**	Don Young (Lib)	Elizabeth Thurman	Peter Burgoyne		Anne Hobbs (Ind); Fay Mills (ARP)
South Brisbane	Labor	**Anna Bligh**	Leo Tsimpikas (Lib)	Raymond Meiers		Anthony Lee	Guy Freemarijuana (Ind); Chris Ray (ARP); Murray Swan (Ind); Coral Wynter (Ind); Mario Zocchi (AFP)
Southport	National	Peter Lawlor	**Mick Veivers** (Nat)	Jay Nauss		John Huta	
Springwood	Liberal	Grant Musgrove	**Luke Woolmer** (Lib)	Neil Pitt		Paul Thomson	Allan De Brenni (Ind); Mark Mackintosh (ARP)
Sunnybank	Labor	**Stephen Robertson**	Steven Huang (Lib)	Ken Lock	Andrew Grigg		
Surfers Paradise	National	Steve Axe	**Rob Borbidge** (Nat)	Phil Connolly	Ray Schearer		
Tablelands	National	Nigel Tucker	**Tom Gilmore** (Nat)	Shaun Nelson			
Thuringowa	Labor	**Ken McElligott**	Ross Contarino (Nat); David Moore (Lib)	Ken Turner		Annette Reed	Lilian Malcolm (Ind)
Toowoomba North	National	Kerry Shine	**Graham Healy** (Nat)	Ron Davy			Barry Reid (ARP)
Toowoomba South	National	Andrew Isfree	**Mike Horan** (Nat)	Darryl Shoesmith			Andrew Chambers (ARP)
Townsville	Labor	Mike Reynolds	Joy Rutledge (Lib)	Ted Ive			Steve McGuire (ARP); Billy Tait (Ind)
Warrego	National	Elizabeth Pommer	**Howard Hobbs** (Nat)	Victor Espie			Sandy Kidd (Ind); Bev Salisbury (Shooters)
Warwick	National	Jeffrey Singleton	**Lawrence Springborg** (Nat)	Joan White	Kim Olsen		
Waterford	Labor	**Tom Barton**	Aidan McLindon (Lib)	Jim Hebbard			
Western Downs	National	Ron Lockwood	**Brian Littleproud** (Nat)	Peter McLaren			
Whitsunday	Labor	**Lorraine Bird**	Ian Roebuck (Nat)	Harry Black			
Woodridge	Labor	**Bill D'Arcy**	Adam Young (Lib)	Leonce Kealy		Robert Hernandez	
Yeronga	Labor	**Matt Foley**	John Webster (Lib)	Vanessa Pacitto	Stephen Burchall		Rick Stapleton (ARP)

== See also ==
- Members of the Queensland Legislative Assembly, 1995–1998
- Members of the Queensland Legislative Assembly, 1998–2001
- 1998 Queensland state election
