= Electoral results for the district of Mundingburra =

Queensland, Australia, district election results

This is a list of electoral results for the electoral district of Mundingburra in Queensland state elections.

== Members for Mundingburra ==
First incarnation (1912–1960)
Member	Party	Term
Thomas Foley	Labor	1912–1920
John Dash	Labor	1920–1944
Tom Aikens	North Queensland Labor	1944–1960
Second incarnation (1992–present)
Member	Party	Term
Ken Davies	Labor	1992–1995
Frank Tanti	Liberal	1996–1998
Lindy Nelson-Carr	Labor	1998–2012
David Crisafulli	Liberal National	2012–2015
Coralee O'Rourke	Labor	2015–2020
Les Walker	Labor	2020–2024
Janelle Poole	Liberal National	2024–present

== Election results ==
=== Elections in the 2020s ===
2024 Queensland state election: Mundingburra
Party	Candidate	Votes	%	±%
Liberal National	Janelle Poole	13,020	44.36	+11.96
Labor	Les Walker	8,864	30.20	−8.10
Katter's Australian	Michael Pugh	3,808	12.97	+0.87
Greens	Rebecca Haley	2,255	7.68	+0.78
One Nation	Mick Olsen	1,405	4.79	+0.19
Total formal votes		29,352	96.02	
Informal votes		1,089	3.58	
Turnout		30,441	86.63	
Two-party-preferred result
Liberal National	Janelle Poole	17,380	59.21	+13.11
Labor	Les Walker	11,972	40.79	−13.11
Liberal National gain from Labor		Swing	+13.11	

2020 Queensland state election: Mundingburra
Party	Candidate	Votes	%	±%
Labor	Les Walker	10,839	38.22	+6.80
Liberal National	Glenn Doyle	9,170	32.33	+6.21
Katter's Australian	Alannah Tomlinson	3,448	12.16	−1.72
Greens	Jenny Brown	1,953	6.89	−0.75
One Nation	Ian Bowron	1,323	4.67	−12.00
Legalise Cannabis	Susan Jackson	1,307	4.61	+4.61
United Australia	Martin Brewster	320	1.13	+1.13
Total formal votes		28,360	96.78	+1.63
Informal votes		945	3.22	−1.63
Turnout		29,305	87.73	+0.95
Two-party-preferred result
Labor	Les Walker	15,295	53.93	+2.80
Liberal National	Glenn Doyle	13,065	46.07	−2.80
Labor hold		Swing	+2.80	

=== Elections in the 2010s ===
2017 Queensland state election: Mundingburra
Party	Candidate	Votes	%	±%
Labor	Coralee O'Rourke	8,768	31.4	−6.0
Liberal National	Matthew Derlagen	7,290	26.1	−14.5
One Nation	Mal Charlwood	4,652	16.7	+15.5
Katter's Australian	Mike Abraham	3,874	13.9	+10.8
Greens	Jenny Brown	2,130	7.6	+0.7
Independent	Dennis Easzon	468	1.7	+1.7
Independent	Alan Birrell	365	1.3	+1.3
Independent	Geoff Virgo	360	1.3	+1.3
Total formal votes		27,907	95.1	−2.6
Informal votes		1,423	4.9	+2.6
Turnout		29,330	86.8	−3.9
Two-party-preferred result
Labor	Coralee O'Rourke	14,268	51.1	−0.7
Liberal National	Matthew Derlagen	13,639	48.9	+0.7
Labor hold		Swing	−0.7	

2015 Queensland state election: Mundingburra
Party	Candidate	Votes	%	±%
Liberal National	David Crisafulli	10,921	41.32	−2.02
Labor	Coralee O'Rourke	10,596	40.09	+14.37
Palmer United	Clive Mensink	2,874	10.87	+10.87
Greens	Jenny Brown	2,040	7.72	+2.69
Total formal votes		26,431	97.76	+0.11
Informal votes		606	2.24	−0.11
Turnout		27,037	89.60	−0.29
Two-party-preferred result
Labor	Coralee O'Rourke	13,104	52.76	+12.95
Liberal National	David Crisafulli	11,733	47.24	−12.95
Labor gain from Liberal National		Swing	+12.95	

2012 Queensland state election: Mundingburra
Party	Candidate	Votes	%	±%
Liberal National	David Crisafulli	11,069	43.34	+5.54
Labor	Mark Harrison	6,569	25.72	−22.68
Katter's Australian	David Moyle	5,875	23.00	+23.00
Greens	Bret Fishley	1,283	5.02	−3.64
Family First	Michael Waters	745	2.92	−0.63
Total formal votes		25,541	97.65	+0.09
Informal votes		614	2.35	−0.09
Turnout		26,155	89.89	+0.84
Two-party-preferred result
Liberal National	David Crisafulli	12,924	60.19	+16.78
Labor	Mark Harrison	8,547	39.81	−16.78
Liberal National gain from Labor		Swing	+16.78	

=== Elections in the 2000s ===
2009 Queensland state election: Mundingburra
Party	Candidate	Votes	%	±%
Labor	Lindy Nelson-Carr	12,625	48.4	−6.8
Liberal National	Colin Dwyer	9,859	37.8	+2.7
Greens	Jenny Brown	2,259	8.7	−0.5
Family First	Amanda Nickson	925	3.5	+3.5
Independent	Francis Pauler	415	1.6	+1.6
Total formal votes		26,083	97.4	
Informal votes		652	2.6	
Turnout		26,735	89.1	
Two-party-preferred result
Labor	Lindy Nelson-Carr	13,636	56.6	−4.5
Liberal National	Colin Dwyer	10,460	43.4	+4.5
Labor hold		Swing	−4.5	

2006 Queensland state election: Mundingburra
Party	Candidate	Votes	%	±%
Labor	Lindy Nelson-Carr	13,321	54.7	+8.9
Liberal	Mick Reilly	8,711	35.7	+3.1
Greens	Jenny Stirling	2,343	9.6	+1.5
Total formal votes		24,375	97.7	−0.2
Informal votes		582	2.3	+0.2
Turnout		24,957	89.2	−1.2
Two-party-preferred result
Labor	Lindy Nelson-Carr	14,109	60.5	+4.3
Liberal	Mick Reilly	9,196	39.5	−4.3
Labor hold		Swing	+4.3	

2004 Queensland state election: Mundingburra
Party	Candidate	Votes	%	±%
Labor	Lindy Nelson-Carr	11,099	45.8	−3.1
Liberal	Steve Hawker	7,906	32.6	+4.1
Greens	Matt Grantham	1,958	8.1	+4.3
One Nation	John Weil	1,850	7.6	−9.4
Independent	Sandra Hubert	1,403	5.8	+5.8
Total formal votes		24,216	97.9	−0.1
Informal votes		519	2.1	+0.1
Turnout		24,735	90.4	−1.1
Two-party-preferred result
Labor	Lindy Nelson-Carr	12,314	56.2	−5.2
Liberal	Steve Hawker	9,590	43.8	+5.2
Labor hold		Swing	−5.2	

2001 Queensland state election: Mundingburra
Party	Candidate	Votes	%	±%
Labor	Lindy Nelson-Carr	11,640	48.9	+6.6
Liberal	David Moore	6,780	28.5	+4.5
One Nation	Trevor Elson	4,056	17.0	−8.2
Greens	Rebecca Smith	904	3.8	+3.8
City Country Alliance	Michael Staines	439	1.8	+1.8
Total formal votes		23,819	98.0	
Informal votes		484	2.0	
Turnout		24,303	91.5	
Two-party-preferred result
Labor	Lindy Nelson-Carr	12,598	61.4	+9.0
Liberal	David Moore	7,928	38.6	−9.0
Labor hold		Swing	+9.0	

=== Elections in the 1990s ===
1998 Queensland state election: Mundingburra
Party	Candidate	Votes	%	±%
Labor	Lindy Nelson-Carr	8,756	44.7	+0.9
Liberal	Frank Tanti	6,011	30.7	−13.7
One Nation	Trevor Elson	4,807	24.6	+24.6
Total formal votes		19,574	98.3	−0.2
Informal votes		331	1.7	+0.2
Turnout		19,905	92.4	+3.8
Two-party-preferred result
Labor	Lindy Nelson-Carr	9,884	53.8	+3.8
Liberal	Frank Tanti	8,486	46.2	−3.8
Labor hold		Swing	+3.8	

1996 Mundingburra state by-election
Party	Candidate	Votes	%	±%
Liberal	Frank Tanti	9,155	45.33	+0.93
Labor	Tony Mooney	8,133	40.17	–3.65
Independent	Ken Davies	835	4.13	+4.13
Women's Party	Pauline Woodbridge	626	3.10	+3.10
The Australians Party	Rea Brown	501	2.48	+2.48
Independent	Billy Tait	344	1.70	+1.70
Independent	Alex Caldwell	151	0.75	+0.75
Independent	Tisha Crosland	128	0.63	+0.63
Independent	Michael Bourne	118	0.58	+0.58
Independent	Antony Bradshaw	117	0.58	+0.58
Independent	Sandy Warren	73	0.36	+0.36
Independent	Christian Jocumsen	35	0.17	+0.17
Total formal votes		20,196	98.82	+0.29
Informal votes		242	1.18	–0.29
Turnout		20,438	89.44	+0.85
Two-party-preferred result
Liberal	Frank Tanti	10,261	52.79	+2.83
Labor	Tony Mooney	9,177	47.21	–2.83
Liberal gain from Labor		Swing	+2.83	

1995 Queensland state election: Mundingburra
Party	Candidate	Votes	%	±%
Liberal	Frank Tanti	8,541	44.4	+20.3
Labor	Ken Davies	8,429	43.8	−9.3
Greens	Russell Cumming	2,265	11.8	+11.8
Total formal votes		19,235	98.5	+1.4
Informal votes		287	1.5	−1.4
Turnout		19,522	88.6	
Two-party-preferred result
Labor	Ken Davies	9,308	50.04	−9.4
Liberal	Frank Tanti	9,292	49.96	+9.4
Labor hold		Swing	−9.4	

1992 Queensland state election: Mundingburra
Party	Candidate	Votes	%	±%
Labor	Ken Davies	11,125	53.1	−0.6
Liberal	Jim Cathcart	5,042	24.1	+6.2
National	Reg Fenton	3,335	15.9	−10.6
Democrats	Colin Parker	1,439	6.9	+6.9
Total formal votes		20,941	97.1	
Informal votes		622	2.9	
Turnout		21,563	89.9	
Two-party-preferred result
Labor	Ken Davies	11,753	59.4	+1.7
Liberal	Jim Cathcart	8,033	40.6	+40.6
Labor hold		Swing	+1.7	

=== Elections in the 1950s ===
1957 Queensland state election: Mundingburra
Party	Candidate	Votes	%	±%
NQ Labor	Tom Aikens	7,488	75.1	−2.8
Labor	Jim Mahony	1,920	19.3	−2.8
Independent	George Fletcher Evans	564	5.6	+5.6
Total formal votes		9,972	98.7	+0.7
Informal votes		132	1.3	−0.7
Turnout		10,104	94.2	+0.6
NQ Labor hold		Swing	+1.7	

1956 Queensland state election: Mundingburra
Party	Candidate	Votes	%	±%
NQ Labor	Tom Aikens	7,296	77.9	+25.4
Labor	John Brennan	2,074	22.1	−5.6
Total formal votes		9,370	98.0	−1.3
Informal votes		189	2.0	+1.3
Turnout		9,559	93.6	−1.2
NQ Labor hold		Swing	+15.5	

1953 Queensland state election: Mundingburra
Party	Candidate	Votes	%	±%
NQ Labor	Tom Aikens	4,372	52.5	+9.9
Labor	Daniel Gleeson	2,303	27.7	+3.8
Liberal	Christopher Wordsworth	1,647	19.8	−13.9
Total formal votes		8,322	99.3	+0.6
Informal votes		56	0.7	−0.6
Turnout		8,378	94.8	+2.5
NQ Labor hold		Swing	N/A	

1950 Queensland state election: Mundingburra
Party	Candidate	Votes	%	±%
NQ Labor	Tom Aikens	3,348	42.6	
Liberal	William Brackin	2,664	33.7	
Labor	Jim Mahony	1,889	23.9	
Total formal votes		7,901	98.7	
Informal votes		105	1.3	
Turnout		8,006	92.3	
NQ Labor hold		Swing		

=== Elections in the 1940s ===
1947 Queensland state election: Mundingburra
Party	Candidate	Votes	%	±%
NQ Labor	Tom Aikens	4,541	39.6	+4.0
Independent	Arthur Coburn	4,296	37.5	+10.7
Labor	George Parker	2,630	22.9	−5.6
Total formal votes		11,467	99.4	+0.2
Informal votes		67	0.6	−0.2
Turnout		11,534	90.9	+3.7
NQ Labor hold		Swing	N/A	

1944 Queensland state election: Mundingburra
Party	Candidate	Votes	%	±%
Hermit Park Labor	Tom Aikens	3,658	35.6	+35.6
Labor	Lionel Tomlins	2,930	28.5	−27.8
Independent	Arthur Coburn	2,753	26.8	+26.8
People's Party	Harry Pass	763	7.4	+7.4
Independent Labor	Lionel Parsons	179	1.7	+1.7
Total formal votes		10,283	99.2	+1.6
Informal votes		83	0.8	−1.6
Turnout		10,366	87.2	−3.7
Independent gain from Labor		Swing	N/A	

1941 Queensland state election: Mundingburra
Party	Candidate	Votes	%	±%
Labor	John Dash	5,623	56.3	+6.0
Protestant Labour	Lionel Parsons	2,735	27.4	+9.1
Communist	Doug Olive	1,624	16.3	+7.3
Total formal votes		9,982	97.6	−1.0
Informal votes		243	2.4	+1.0
Turnout		10,225	90.9	−2.1
Labor hold		Swing	N/A	

- Preferences were not distributed.

=== Elections in the 1930s ===
1938 Queensland state election: Mundingburra
Party	Candidate	Votes	%	±%
Labor	John Dash	4,773	50.3	−17.1
Country	Francis Hughes	2,128	22.4	−2.2
Protestant Labour	Lionel Parsons	1,733	18.3	+18.3
Communist	Doug Olive	856	9.0	+9.0
Total formal votes		9,490	98.6	+0.2
Informal votes		130	1.4	−0.2
Turnout		9,620	93.0	−1.8
Labor hold		Swing	N/A	

- Preferences were not distributed.

1935 Queensland state election: Mundingburra
Party	Candidate	Votes	%	±%
Labor	John Dash	6,054	67.4	
CPNP	Francis Hughes	2,210	24.6	
Communist	Albert Robinson	720	8.0	
Total formal votes		8,984	98.4	
Informal votes		148	1.6	
Turnout		9,132	94.8	
Labor hold		Swing		

- Preferences were not distributed.

1932 Queensland state election: Mundingburra
Party	Candidate	Votes	%	±%
Labor	John Dash	4,921	66.9	
CPNP	John Garbutt	2,434	33.1	
Total formal votes		7,355	99.2	
Informal votes		58	0.8	
Turnout		7,413	94.4	
Labor hold		Swing		

=== Elections in the 1920s ===
1929 Queensland state election: Mundingburra
Party	Candidate	Votes	%	±%
Labor	John Dash	4,995	81.5	+7.5
Communist	Edward Tripp	1,137	18.5	+18.5
Total formal votes		6,132	92.6	−6.5
Informal votes		492	7.4	+6.5
Turnout		6,624	93.7	+2.4
Labor hold		Swing	N/A	

1926 Queensland state election: Mundingburra
Party	Candidate	Votes	%	±%
Labor	John Dash	3,285	74.0	+9.5
CPNP	Miles Andrews	1,465	26.0	−9.5
Total formal votes		5,639	99.1	+0.1
Informal votes		53	0.9	−0.1
Turnout		5,692	91.3	+0.6
Labor hold		Swing	+9.5	

1923 Queensland state election: Mundingburra
Party	Candidate	Votes	%	±%
Labor	John Dash	3,285	64.5	+4.5
United	William Swales	1,810	35.5	+35.5
Total formal votes		5,095	99.0	+0.8
Informal votes		50	1.0	−0.8
Turnout		5,145	90.7	+8.4
Labor hold		Swing	+4.5	

1920 Queensland state election: Mundingburra
Party	Candidate	Votes	%	±%
Labor	John Dash	3,714	60.0	−10.1
Northern Country	John Clegg	2,473	40.0	+10.1
Total formal votes		6,187	98.2	−0.6
Informal votes		115	1.8	+0.6
Turnout		6,302	82.3	+0.2
Labor hold		Swing	−10.1	

=== Elections in the 1910s ===
1918 Queensland state election: Mundingburra
Party	Candidate	Votes	%	±%
Labor	Thomas Foley	4,066	70.1	−0.1
National	Charles Pennger	1,732	29.9	+0.1
Total formal votes		5,798	98.8	+1.7
Informal votes		73	1.2	−1.7
Turnout		5,871	82.1	−1.2
Labor hold		Swing	−0.1	

1915 Queensland state election: Mundingburra
Party	Candidate	Votes	%	±%
Labor	Thomas Foley	2,959	70.2	+8.5
Liberal	Thomas Page	1,255	29.8	−8.5
Total formal votes		4,214	97.1	−1.8
Informal votes		125	2.9	+1.8
Turnout		4,339	83.3	+7.0
Labor hold		Swing	+8.5	

1912 Queensland state election: Mundingburra
Party	Candidate	Votes	%	±%
Labor	Thomas Foley	1,974	61.7	
Liberal	William Little	1,226	38.3	
Total formal votes		3,200	98.9	
Informal votes		34	1.1	
Turnout		3,234	76.3	
Labor hold		Swing		
