= 1996 Mundingburra state by-election =

- 3 February 1996

The seat of Mundingburra in the Legislative Assembly
- Turnout: 20,438
Candidate	Frank Tanti	Tony Mooney
Party	Liberal	Labor
First-preference vote	9,155	8,133
Percentage	45.33%	40.17%
MLA before election
Ken Davies
Labor
Elected MLA
Frank Tanti
Liberal

The 1996 Mundingburra state by-election was a by-election held on 3 February 1996 for the Queensland Legislative Assembly seat of Mundingburra, located in the southern suburbs of Townsville. It was brought on by the Court of Disputed Returns declaring void the close result of the July 1995 election in the normally safe Labor seat, and resulted in the end of the Goss Ministry headed by Labor Premier Wayne Goss, and the swearing in of a minority government led by Nationals leader Rob Borbidge.

== Background ==
The state election was held on 15 July 1995, with the Labor Party under Premier Wayne Goss hoping to win a third term in office. About ten seats were too close to call in early counting, and it was some days before the result was declared—a nine-seat loss for Labor, giving it 45 of 89 seats in the Legislative Assembly, and a two-party-preferred swing against it of 7.15%. The last seat to be declared on 25 July was the Townsville-based seat of Mundingburra, which Labor's Ken Davies won by just 16 votes in a three-candidate race against Liberal candidate Frank Tanti. This represented an 8% swing against Davies based on the 1992 result. On 31 July 1995, Goss elevated Davies to the lowest-ranking position in the ministry, assigning him the portfolios of Emergency Services and Consumer Affairs.

On 4 August, the Liberal Party decided to challenge the result on several counts. The Liberals claimed multiple voting had occurred and that 165 people were not at the addresses they had provided. Most seriously, they claimed 22 overseas military personnel did not get to vote, as a plane carrying about 100 votes from Rwanda arrived too late for the votes to be counted. The challenge was heard by Justice Brian Ambrose concurrently with a Labor challenge to the result in Greenslopes, which the Liberals had won by 41 votes. On 8 December 1995, Ambrose determined that no breach of the Electoral Act had occurred, but the closeness of the result together with the issue of the 22 military votes meant that the election should be voided and re-run. The Greenslopes result was maintained on the basis of the larger margin between the parties despite a finding that the Electoral Act had not been entirely observed.

The result was that Labor had 44 seats, the Coalition 43, and Gladstone independent Liz Cunningham held the remaining seat. If Labor were to win the seat, they would regain their one-seat majority, but if they lost it and the House was equally divided, then Cunningham would be able to select the government. She refused to indicate which way she would lean, arguing that Mundingburra electors should cast their vote first without undue pressure.

On 12 December 1995, Goss called the poll for 3 February 1996, pleading with voters in the electorate to end the political instability "bedevilling" the state. He said the date would give voters the "shortest campaign possible and the earliest opportunity" to make their choice, acknowledging that the 1995 result was "a kick in the pants", but insisting the Government had learned its lesson. Both the Coalition and Labor campaigns asked their parties' Federal leaders to stay away from the campaign in order that state and federal issues not become conflated. Goss told the Sunday program that he felt "there's a bit of an 'It's Time' factor developing" for Prime Minister Paul Keating, and that if he was to lose the poll, "I'll accept the responsibility for that and it won't be any southern politician who's been here." Meanwhile, Liberal campaign director Jim Barron believed federal Opposition Leader John Howard had "got enough on his plate anyway" and that there was "[no] necessity to bring in other key political figures from outside the State."

== The campaign ==
=== The first weeks: selecting the candidates ===
The original poll had been between the incumbent member, Labor candidate Ken Davies, Liberal candidate Frank Tanti and Greens candidate Russell Cumming. Davies, formerly an accountant, had been a member of the Assembly since the 1989 election. However, Davies was fighting a $690,000 lawsuit lodged by the Commonwealth Bank over his former accountancy practice—which, if it had resulted in his having to declare bankruptcy, would have caused the forfeiture of his seat. On 15 December 1995, the party's administrative committee met for 2 1/2 hours and resolved not to preselect Davies as its candidate for the election, and a day later approved the nomination of the long-serving Mayor of the City of Townsville, Tony Mooney. One factor in the decision was internal ALP polling which suggested Davies had become an electoral liability in the seat and Mooney, who was considered to be popular and articulate and who had won 58% of the vote as mayor in the electorate's booths, was their best hope. Malcolm Mackerras, a leading political analyst, believed the decision was "fully justified", and that "if they'd kept [Davies], they'd have thrown the seat away", noting that the 9.4% primary vote swing against Davies at the election was much greater than the state average and one of the biggest against a sitting Labor candidate in what should have been one of Labor's safest seats.

The decision proved to be controversial. The following week, the Greens, who had polled 11.5% of the vote at the 1995 election, had suggested they may not preference Mooney due to his pro-development stance and previous clashes with the environmental movement, especially over the Nelly Bay resort development on Magnetic Island, and Davies, who was directing all calls to the Sydney promoter Harry M. Miller, announced that he had a story that would "rock the Goss Government" when it was told. On 21 December, Davies hit out directly at Goss, accusing him of breaking a promise made to him before he entered politics, saying, "It was a package he was offering me. He made a commitment to me and I expected him to abide by that commitment." He asserted the claims he would be bankrupted by the legal case were "uninformed", and that the case was public knowledge before he was appointed to the Ministry. He announced on 9 January 1996 that he would run as an independent, and told the media he had been discussing with Liz Cunningham about "how two independents could work together for the benefit of the people of Queensland".

The Liberals re-ran with Frank Tanti, a local shop manager and cabinet-maker with military experience and strong religious beliefs. They ran a low-key campaign which said little about his agenda should he win, but did criticise the closure of two railway workshops in Townsville which was estimated to have cost 300 jobs. When asked about bigger issues, he replied, "I am not expected to know everything. I am not in a position to stuff things up." Queensland political commentator Professor John Wanna later described him as "the little local battler, who campaigned earnestly but was widely regarded as a politically unsophisticated nobody."

The Greens' bid imploded before the campaign began, due to disagreements between the party's preselected candidate, Tony Clunies-Ross, and the party hierarchy over preferences. In the end the Greens did not run a candidate. However, by the end of December, the Australian Women's Party had preselected candidate Pauline Woodbridge from the Northern Queensland Domestic Violence Resource Centre, whilst the North Queensland Party advocating a separate state, the right-wing Australians Party, a nude beach campaigner from Surfers Paradise, two independents seeking the legalisation of marijuana, another advocating the rights of subcontractors against failed construction companies and one desiring a new power station had also announced their candidacy in the race. On 12 January 1996, the ballot was drawn with a record 12 candidates, most of whom were independents.

=== Other events ===
On 19 December, Goss fired the first shot in the campaign by promising a A$1 billion Korean zinc refinery if elected. It would, once finished, be the biggest zinc smelter and refinery complex in the world. However, this announcement was somewhat overshadowed by media interest in dumped candidate Davies's comments. By 23 December, polls were predicting a slim victory for the Liberals, and by 7 January this had widened to an eight per cent lead, with 39% of voters in an AGB McNair poll indicating that they were less likely to vote for Labor over the replacement of Davies with Mooney, whilst 29% indicated they were more likely. Labor fought back by leaking details of how Davies had hired his wife as an electoral secretary while in Parliament, and Goss indicated that he would consider approaching the Governor for fresh elections if Tanti won. Some Labor critics saw this as evidence he was "losing the plot" and should be replaced as leader by Health Minister Peter Beattie, a member of Labor's "old guard" faction at odds with the dominant Australian Workers' Union faction in the state party.

The campaign took a turn for the bizarre when Davies revealed on 15 January that he had been offered an all-expenses-paid seven-week holiday in the South Pacific and a $50,000-a-year job as a party organiser by the Labor Party. Senior minister Bob Gibbs admitted these had been offered to Davies, but simply "to help him through a stressful and difficult time... [and] to see him through his financial difficulties." Labor went on the attack, offering to open its lawyers' files in an effort to prove Davies had not been offered inducements not to run, which would have been a violation of the Electoral Act. The Liberal candidate contacted the police and the Criminal Justice Commission (CJC) to investigate Davies' claims, while the Electoral Commissioner, Des O'Shea, said the integrity of the by-election was not in jeopardy as Davies had stood for election anyway. On 1 February, the CJC cleared the Labor Party.

The task of winning became more complicated when on 26 January, Paul Keating announced the federal election for 2 March. Goss claimed that Mundingburra voters were annoyed with "all the outside issues, all the blow-ins... and the mud-slinging and the game playing", which he labelled as "outside distractions". An opinion poll by Newspoll on 29–31 January, conducted with 912 voters within the electorate, suggested Labor had narrowed the gap to 3%, although with 3% of the electorate still undecided about how they would vote. The final poll before the election, taken by AGB McNair on 31 January and 1 February, put Mooney marginally ahead.

Professor Wanna later commented that "with Labor in disarray, no amount of money, campaign tactics or flying visits could repair the damage." A political commentator based in Townsville told the Sydney Morning Herald that the electoral roll had changed by about 30% since July, due to a lot of movement by public servants and the army, and that some new residents did not qualify to vote as they had arrived too late to enrol. On election day, The Age described the campaign in retrospect as a "thrill-a-minute plot with spellbinding dirty tricks that have kept locals—used to this sort of thing—away in droves", and characterised the main candidates as "the man who talks to God, the man who runs on hurt, or the ambitious Mayor".

== Timeline ==
Date	Event
15 July 1995	Elections were held across Queensland to fill 89 seats in the Legislative Assembly.
25 July 1995	The seat of Mundingburra was declared with a margin of 16 votes for the incumbent member, Labor's Ken Davies.
4 August 1995	The Liberal Party confirmed they would challenge the result in the Court of Disputed Returns.
8 December 1995	Justice Brian Ambrose declared the Mundingburra poll void and the seat vacant.
12 December 1995	Premier Wayne Goss requested that the Governor of Queensland issue a writ to proceed with a by-election on 3 February.
16 December 1995	The Labor Party replaced its candidate, incumbent member Ken Davies, with the Mayor of Townsville, Tony Mooney.
10 January 1996	Davies announced his candidature as an independent, after weeks of speculation.
12 January 1996	Close of nominations and draw of ballot papers, with a record 12 candidates contesting the poll.
3 February 1996	Polling day, between the hours of 8am and 6pm.

== Results ==
It was clear on election night counting that Frank Tanti had won the seat, leading Tony Mooney by 813 votes and capturing an estimated 52% of the two-party vote, although with almost 15% of votes remaining to be counted. The Liberals were sufficiently confident to declare victory on the night, with Goss admitting Labor had probably lost the race. A startled Tanti told media on the night, "They outspent us seven to one, they've taken the people for granted as usual, they don't listen, they haven't learnt a damn thing and I'm proud to be part of history." The official result was declared later the same week.

Mundingburra state by-election, 3 February 1996
Party	Candidate	Votes	%	±%
Liberal	Frank Tanti	9,155	45.33	+0.93
Labor	Tony Mooney	8,133	40.17	–3.65
Independent	Ken Davies	835	4.13	+4.13
Independent	Pauline Woodbridge	626	3.10	+3.10
Independent	Rea Brown	501	2.48	+2.48
Independent	Billy Tait	344	1.70	+1.70
Independent	Alex Caldwell	151	0.75	+0.75
Independent	Tisha Crosland	128	0.63	+0.63
Independent	Michael Bourne	118	0.58	+0.58
Independent	Antony Bradshaw	117	0.58	+0.58
Independent	Sandy Warren	73	0.36	+0.36
Independent	Christian Jocumsen	35	0.17	+0.17
Total formal votes		20,196	98.82	+0.29
Informal votes		242	1.18	–0.29
Turnout		20,438	89.44	+0.85
Two-party-preferred result
Liberal	Frank Tanti	10,261	52.79	+2.83
Labor	Tony Mooney	9,177	47.21	–2.83
Liberal gain from Labor		Swing	+2.83	

== Aftermath ==
The loss of Mundingburra deprived the Labor government of Wayne Goss of what had previously been a one-seat majority. The election of Liberal candidate Frank Tanti produced a hung parliament with Labor holding 44 seats, the National–Liberal Coalition holding 44 seats, and the balance of power held by the sole independent Liz Cunningham.

On 12 February 1996—nine days after the Mundingburra by-election—Cunningham announced her support for the National–Liberal coalition. Facing certain defeat on the floor of parliament, Goss resigned his commission on 19 February, and National Party leader Rob Borbidge was sworn in as the new Premier of Queensland.

The seat returned to Labor at the 1998 state election, when Lindy Nelson-Carr won against Tanti on a 6.7% swing.

== See also ==
- List of Queensland state by-elections
