= Wayne Goss =

Australian politician

The Honourable Wayne Goss
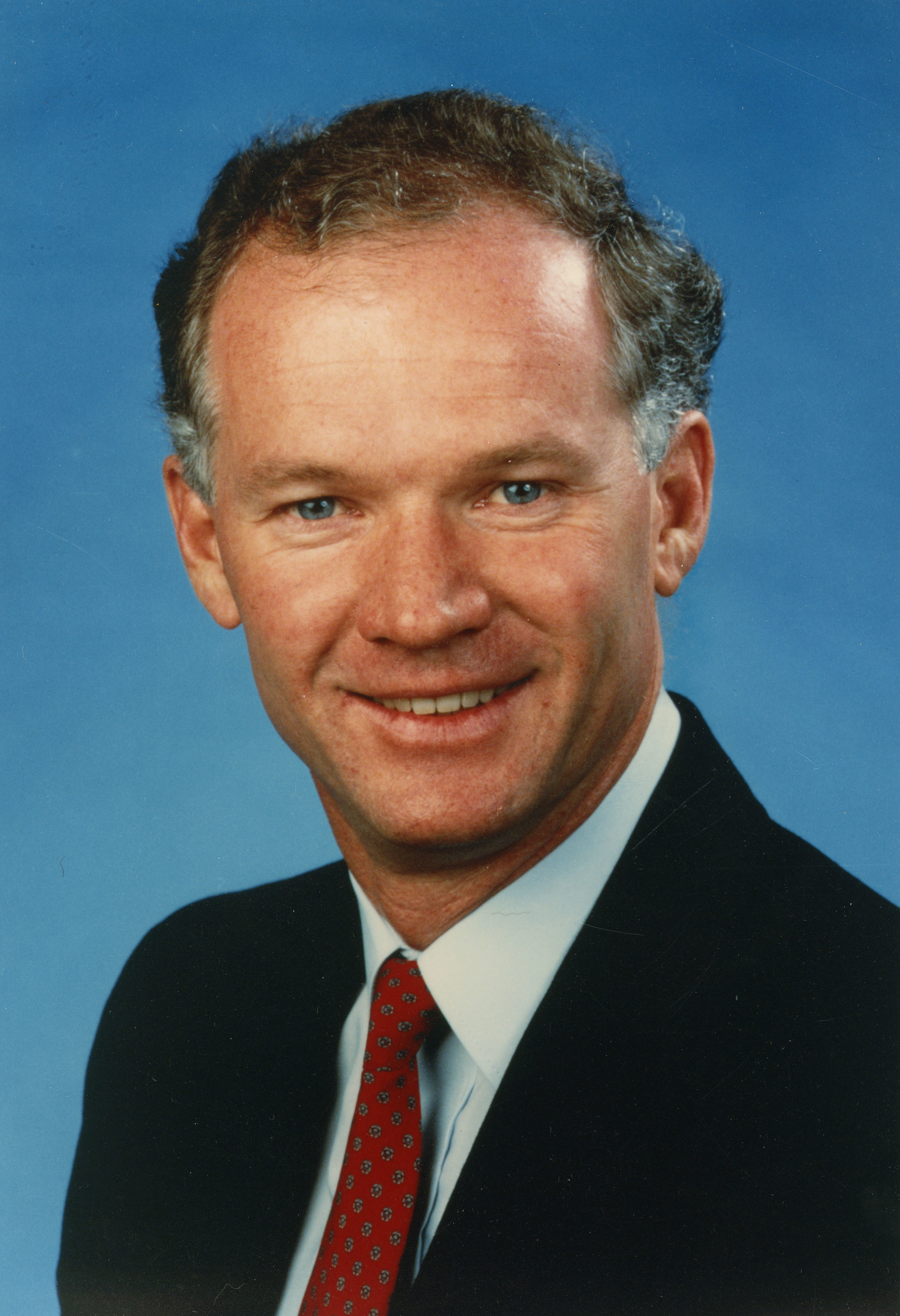
- Official portrait, 1996

34th Premier of Queensland
- In office 7 December 1989 – 19 February 1996
- Monarch: Elizabeth II
- Governor: Walter Campbell; Leneen Forde
- Deputy: Tom Burns
- Preceded by: Russell Cooper
- Succeeded by: Rob Borbidge

Minister for Economic and Trade Development
- In office 7 December 1989 – 19 February 1996
- Preceded by: Position established
- Succeeded by: Doug Slack

Minister for the Arts
- In office 7 December 1989 – 24 September 1992
- Preceded by: Paul Clauson
- Succeeded by: Dean Wells

Leader of the Opposition in Queensland
- In office 2 March 1988 – 2 December 1989
- Deputy: Tom Burns
- Preceded by: Neville Warburton
- Succeeded by: Russell Cooper

Leader of the Labor Party in Queensland
- In office 2 March 1988 – 19 February 1996
- Deputy: Tom Burns
- Preceded by: Neville Warburton
- Succeeded by: Peter Beattie

Member of the Queensland Legislative Assembly for Logan
- In office 1 November 1986 – 13 June 1998
- Preceded by: New seat
- Succeeded by: John Mickel

Member of the Queensland Legislative Assembly for Salisbury
- In office 22 October 1983 – 1 November 1986
- Preceded by: Rosemary Kyburz
- Succeeded by: Len Ardill

Personal details
- Born: Wayne Keith Goss; 26 February 1951 Mundubbera, Queensland, Australia
- Died: 10 November 2014 (aged 63) Brisbane, Queensland, Australia
- Party: Labor
- Spouse: Roisin Hirschfeld (m. 1981)
- Children: 2
- Parent(s): Allan James Goss; Norma Josephine Dalton Goss
- Education: Inala State High School
- Alma mater: University of Queensland (LLB, MBA)
- Occupation: Lawyer; Politician

Wayne Keith Goss (26 February 1951 – 10 November 2014) was Premier of Queensland from 7 December 1989 until 19 February 1996, becoming the first Labor Premier of the state in over 32 years. Prior to entering politics, Goss was a solicitor, and after leaving politics he served as chairman of the Queensland Art Gallery and chairman of Deloitte Australia.

== Early life ==
Goss was born at Mundubbera, Queensland, and grew up at Inala where he was educated at Inala State High School and the University of Queensland where he earned a bachelor of laws degree. He worked as a solicitor and then with the Aboriginal Legal Service before setting up his own practice, but did not become a member of the Australian Labor Party until the dismissal of Gough Whitlam's government in November 1975.

== Political career ==
Goss entered state politics as a Labor Party MLA in 1983 for the electoral district of Salisbury and, from 1986 onwards, for Logan.

Along with others, Goss was a key figure in the 1970s–1980s civil liberties fight against the Bjelke-Petersen Government, pursuing legal and political strategies against Bjelke-Petersen. He was elected Leader of the Opposition in March 1988.

=== Leader of the Labor Party ===
Goss led Labor into the 1989 state election against the National Party government of Russell Cooper. The Queensland Nationals were still reeling from revelations of the rampant corruption of longtime premier Joh Bjelke-Petersen, and polls showed Labor had its best chance of winning power in years. Labor had been in opposition since 1957, and last made a serious bid for government in 1972. Cooper had toppled Bjelke-Petersen's immediate successor, Mike Ahern, in a September party-room coup, two months before the writ was dropped.

Goss seized on National ads that argued his plans to decriminalise homosexuality would result in gays flooding into Queensland.

==== Premiership ====
Goss and Labor won a strong majority government at the 1989 election, scoring a 24-seat swing, the worst defeat of a sitting government up until that time in Queensland. This was fuelled by a massive Labor wave that swept through Brisbane; Labor won all but five of the capital's 36 seats.

His election win, which ended 32 years of Coalition/National Party rule, was seen as "the end of the Bjelke-Petersen era" and the beginning of a new era, with The Courier-Mail declaring "Goss the Boss". Once installed in office, he presided over the implementation of many of the reforms of the landmark Fitzgerald Inquiry into police corruption.

The Goss Government introduced several electoral and public sector reforms, the most notable being the elimination of the "Bjelkemander" malapportionment that had helped keep the Queensland Nationals in power. In addition to reforming the state's electoral laws and boundaries, the Goss Government "introduced merit-based appointments to the Queensland public service, created new National Parks and oversaw a new regime of economic and budgetary management" It also introduced social reforms such as decriminalising homosexuality, appointing Queensland's first female Governor, abolishing the Queensland Police Special Branch and Imperial honours, and made provision "to buy thousands of extra university places and hire thousands of new teachers". Goss's Chief of Staff as Premier was former diplomat Kevin Rudd, later leader of the federal Labor Party and Prime Minister of Australia, and Goss's 1989 campaign director was Wayne Swan, subsequently Deputy Prime Minister of Australia. Glyn Davis also worked in senior roles during the Goss governments.

Goss won a second term at the 1992 state election, maintaining the same 19-seat majority he won in 1989 over the National Party and the Liberal Party (the two non-Labor parties went out of coalition in 1983, but resumed the coalition after the 1992 election).

Before the 1995 election, the Goss Government announced a plan to clear sensitive bushland to build the "Second M1" parallel to the Pacific Motorway between Brisbane and the Gold Coast in south-east Queensland. This prompted the Greens Party to do something it had never done before: it recommended that its supporters not give their second preference, on voting ballots, to Labor. Partly as a result of this, as well as the increasing unpopularity of Goss's management style (widely thought to be authoritarian) and growing anger at the federal Labor government, Labor was severely punished at the polls. Notably, it lost several seats in Brisbane's Bayside area, known as 'the koala seats' because of the passion stirred up by a belief that the new road would destroy the habitat of koalas. While Labor lost the popular vote to the Rob Borbidge-led Coalition, Labor managed to win 31 out of 40 seats in Brisbane while most of the Coalition's majority was wasted on large majorities in National heartland. This seemingly allowed Labor to salvage a knife-edge majority of one seat.

After the 1995 election, Labor's majority hung on the Townsville seat of Mundingburra, which had been won by Labor's Ken Davies by only 12 votes over the Coalition's Frank Tanti. However, several irregularities were discovered, the most serious being that several servicemen serving in Rwanda did not have their votes counted. The Supreme Court of Queensland, sitting as a Court of Disputed Returns, ordered a by-election for February 1996, which Tanti won. This outcome brought about a hung Parliament, with both the Coalition and Labor on 44 seats. The balance of power was held by Gladstone's newly elected Independent member, Liz Cunningham. Nine days after the by-election, Cunningham announced that she was going to support the Coalition on the floor of Parliament, leaving Goss with no alternative but to resign as Premier on 19 February 1996.

Goss's defeat proved to be a harbinger of federal Labor's massive defeat in the federal election held a month later. Federal Labor suffered particularly heavy losses in Queensland at the subsequent federal election; it was cut down to only two seats there, its worst result in the state since being reduced to only one seat in 1975. Goss had earlier said that Queensland voters had turned so violently on then-Prime Minister Paul Keating that they had been "sitting on their verandas with baseball bats" waiting for the writs to drop, a phrase that has since entered the Australian political lexicon.

=== Resignation of leadership ===
After resigning as Premier and Leader of the Labor Party on 19 February 1996, Goss returned to the back benches of the Opposition under new Opposition Leader Peter Beattie and assumed something of an "elder statesman" role. He had begun the process of seeking preselection as the Labor candidate for the federal seat of Oxley in the 1998 election. However, a diagnosis of a brain tumour (uneventfully, partially removed) forced him to scale back his activities. Despite support from both sides of Parliament—evidenced when the House gave him a standing ovation on his return from surgery—Goss retired from politics at the 1998 Queensland state election.

== Post-political career ==
After his retirement from politics, Goss served in a variety of community and business roles. He was awarded an MBA at the University of Queensland. Goss was also awarded honorary doctorates (DUniv) by QUT and Griffith University.

Goss was Chairman of the Queensland Art Gallery for 3 terms from 1999 until 2008, a period which included the development of the Queensland Gallery of Modern Art (GoMA), and served a term as a Director of the Brisbane Broncos NRL rugby league team.

Goss received a Centenary Medal in 2001.

In business, Goss served as National Chairman of the Australian section of Deloitte from 2005 to 2013. Goss was also chairman of engineering firm Ausenco from 2002 until 2013. From 2003 to 2007, Goss was on the board of Ingeus Limited, the company founded by Thérèse Rein, the wife of former Australian Prime Minister Kevin Rudd, his former chief-of-staff. Further, Goss was Chairman of FreeTV Australia, the lobby group representing the free-to-air television companies in Australia, from 2008 until 2011.

Goss was also an Ambassador of the Australian Indigenous Education Foundation, and a member of a business task force dealing with the aftermath of the 2010-11 Queensland floods.

== Family ==
Goss lived in Brisbane with his wife, Roisin (née Hirschfeld). Roisin's father was Konrad Hirschfeld (a Rhodes Scholar in 1927) and her grandfather Eugen Hirschfeld (a member of the first University of Queensland Senate in 1910).

Roisin Goss worked in Queensland as a social worker and solicitor, and is a historian. She also undertook philanthropic and voluntary activities especially during the time of the Goss Government.

Wayne and Roisin Goss had two children, Ryan and Caitlin, both of whom attended the University of Queensland and were awarded Rhodes Scholarships to attend the University of Oxford in 2007 and 2009 respectively.

== Death, funeral and legacy ==
Goss battled a recurrent brain tumour for 17 years, undergoing four operations to manage it. He died aged 63 at his home in Brisbane on 10 November 2014, with his wife and children present.

Condolence motions were moved in the Queensland Parliament and in the Parliament of Australia.

In marking Goss's death, former Prime Minister Kevin Rudd described Goss as Queensland's "greatest postwar Premier"; former Premier Peter Beattie described Goss as "Labor's best premier since T. J. Ryan in 1915"; former Premier Anna Bligh stated that "Wayne Goss was the father of modern Queensland". The then Liberal National Premier Campbell Newman acknowledged Goss's "amazing contribution to Queensland".

Instead of a state funeral, a private funeral was held, and a public memorial service was organised by the family at the upper level open spaces areas of the Queensland Gallery of Modern Art. Goss's wife Roisin shared recollections about his life as a private citizen and his favourite saying at family gatherings or just lounging outside on a sunny day: "This Is Good". Close friend and former State Attorney-General, the Hon. Matt Foley gave a detailed testimonial about his friendship with Goss and their days in political office. Over a thousand mourners attended the service, some accommodated in overflow rooms with views to monitors and speakers.

A central building at the Griffith University Logan City campus is named after Goss in recognition of his work as an "education visionary". The rainforest tree genus Gossia in the myrtle family is named after Wayne Goss in honour of his conservation work.

== See also ==
- Goss Ministry
- Gossia

Parliament of Queensland
Preceded by Rosemary Kyburz	Member for Salisbury; 1983–1986	Succeeded by Len Ardill
New district	Member for Logan; 1986–1998	Succeeded by John Mickel
Party political offices
Preceded by Nev Warburton	Leader of the Labor Party in Queensland; 1988–1996	Succeeded by Peter Beattie
Political offices
Preceded by Nev Warburton	Leader of the Opposition in Queensland; 1988–1989	Succeeded by Russell Cooper
Preceded by Russell Cooper	Premier of Queensland; 1989–1996	Succeeded by Rob Borbidge
