= 1995 Queensland state election =

State election in Australia

- 15 July 1995

All 89 seats in the Legislative Assembly of Queensland 45 Assembly seats were needed for a majority
- Turnout: 91.43 (▼0.05 pp)
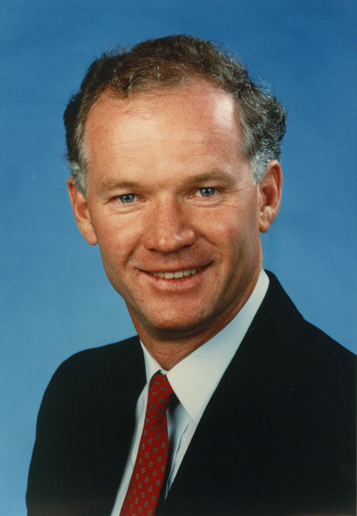

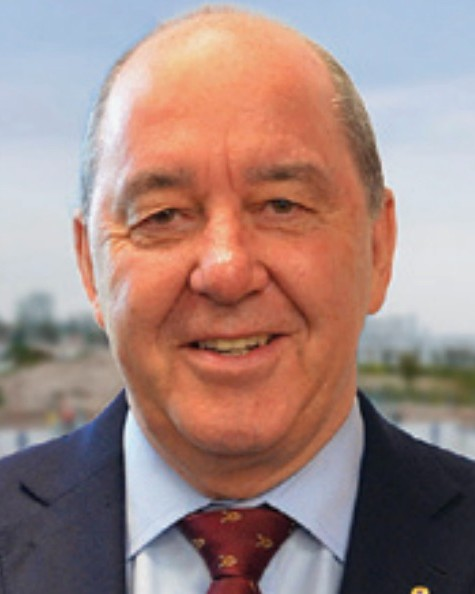
	First party	Second party
Leader	Wayne Goss	Rob Borbidge
Party	Labor	National–Liberal Coalition
Leader since	2 March 1988	10 December 1991
Leader's seat	Logan	Surfers Paradise
Last election	54 seats, 48.73%	35 seats, 44.15%
Seats won	45	43
Seat change	▼9	▲8
Popular vote	773,585	883,580
Percentage	42.89%	48.99%
Swing	▼5.84	▲4.85
TPP	46.73%	53.27%
TPP swing	▼7.00	▲7.00
- The top map shows the first party preference by electorate. The bottom map shows the final two-party preferred vote by electorate.
Premier before election
Wayne Goss
Labor
Elected Premier
Wayne Goss
Labor

Elections were held in the Australian state of Queensland on 15 July 1995 to elect the 89 members of the state's Legislative Assembly.

The Labor Party, which had been in power since the 1989 election and led by Premier Wayne Goss, was elected to a third term, defeating the National–Liberal Coalition under Rob Borbidge. The Queensland Nationals and Liberals were contesting their first election as a coalition in 15 years, having renewed their agreement midway through Goss's second term. The Coalition actually won a majority of the two-party preferred vote. However, most of that vote was wasted on landslide margins in the Nationals' rural heartland. As a result, while the Coalition scored an overall eight-seat swing, it only won nine seats in Greater Brisbane, allowing Labor to hold on to power with a majority of one seat.

On 8 December 1995, the Court of Disputed Returns threw out the results in Mundingburra, which Labor's Ken Davies had won by 16 votes, after it was discovered that 22 overseas military personnel were denied the chance to vote. This forced a by-election, held in February 1996. Liberal Frank Tanti won the by-election, resulting in a hung parliament. With Labor and the Coalition holding 44 seats each, the balance of power rested with Liz Cunningham, the newly-elected Independent member for Gladstone. Cunningham threw her support to the Coalition, allowing Borbidge to form a minority government.

== Key dates ==
Date	Event
20 June 1995	Writs were issued by the Governor to proceed with an election.
24 June 1995	Close of electoral rolls.
27 June 1995	Close of nominations.
15 July 1995	Polling day, between the hours of 8am and 6pm.
31 July 1995	The Goss Ministry was reconstituted.
25 August 1995	The writ was returned and the results formally declared.

== Retiring members ==
=== Labor ===
- Ed Casey (Mackay)
- Pat Comben (Kedron)
- Ken Vaughan (Nudgee)
- Anne Warner (South Brisbane)

== Results ==
Queensland state election, 15 July 1995 Legislative Assembly << 1992–1998 >>
Enrolled voters	2,007,450				
Votes cast	1,835,510		Turnout	91.43%	–0.05%
Informal votes	32,030		Informal	1.75%	–0.50%
Summary of votes by party
Party	Primary votes	%	Swing	Seats	Change
Labor	773,585	42.89%	–5.84%	45	–9
Nationals	473,497	26.25%	+2.54%	29	+3
Liberal	410,083	22.74%	+2.30%	14	+5
Greens	51,748	2.87%	+2.57%	0	±0
Democrats	22,598	1.25%	+0.82%	0	±0
Confederate Action	9,329	0.52%	–0.83%	0	±0
Independent	62,640	3.47%	–1.94%	1	+1
Total	1,803,480			89	
Two-party-preferred
Labor	842,766	46.73%	–7.0%		
National/Liberal	960,714	53.27%	+7.0%		

Popular vote
Labor	42.89%
Nationals	26.25%
Liberal	22.74%
Greens	2.87%
Democrats	1.25%
Confederate Action	0.52%
Independents	3.47%

Seats
Labor	50.56%
Nationals	32.58%
Liberal	15.73%
Independents	1.12%

== Seats changing hands ==
Seat	1992 Election			Swing	1995 Election		
Seat	Party	Member	Margin	Swing	Margin	Member	Party
Albert	Labor	John Szczerbanik	1.64	–5.54	3.89	Bill Baumann	National
Barron River	Labor	Lesley Clark	4.16	–4.55	0.39	Lyn Warwick	Liberal
Gladstone	Labor	Neil Bennett	1.99	–5.05	3.07	Liz Cunningham	Independent
Greenslopes	Labor	Gary Fenlon	7.24	–7.34	0.11	Ted Radke	Liberal
Mansfield	Labor	Laurel Power	2.56	–9.25	6.70	Frank Carroll	Liberal
Mount Ommaney	Labor	Peter Pyke	1.25	–2.93	1.68	Bob Harper	Liberal
Mulgrave	Labor	Warren Pitt	3.17	–3.64	0.47	Naomi Wilson	National
Redlands	Labor	John Budd	5.25	–9.84	4.59	John Hegarty	National
Springwood	Labor	Molly Robson	8.66	–19.43	10.77	Luke Woolmer	Liberal

== Post-election pendulum ==
Labor seats (45)
Marginal
Mundingburra	Ken Davies	ALP	0.04%
Whitsunday	Lorraine Bird	ALP	0.13%
Maryborough	Bob Dollin	ALP	0.37%
Redcliffe	Ray Hollis	ALP	0.38%
Bundaberg	Clem Campbell	ALP	0.51%
Everton	Rod Welford	ALP	1.00%
Ashgrove	Jim Fouras	ALP	1.32%
Thuringowa	Ken McElligott	ALP	1.34%
Sunnybank	Stephen Robertson	ALP	1.37%
Currumbin	Merri Rose	ALP	1.53%
Townsville	Geoff Smith	ALP	1.78%
Hervey Bay	Bill Nunn	ALP	1.92%
Mount Gravatt	Judy Spence	ALP	2.05%
Caboolture	Jon Sullivan	ALP	2.27%
Cairns	Keith De Lacy	ALP	2.35%
Cleveland	Darryl Briskey	ALP	2.45%
Ferny Grove	Glen Milliner	ALP	3.25%
Mount Coot-tha	Wendy Edmond	ALP	3.48%
Kallangur	Ken Hayward	ALP	4.00%
Chatsworth	Terry Mackenroth	ALP	4.23%
Yeronga	Matt Foley	ALP	4.60%
Chermside	Terry Sullivan	ALP	5.34%
Ipswich West	Don Livingstone	ALP	5.49%
Mackay	Tim Mulherin	ALP	5.66%
Kurwongbah	Margaret Woodgate	ALP	5.90%
Fairly Safe
Archerfield	Rod Welford	ALP	6.11%
Rockhampton	Robert Schwarten	ALP	6.42%
Ipswich	David Hamill	ALP	6.44%
Fitzroy	Jim Pearce	ALP	6.62%
Murrumba	Dean Wells	ALP	7.20%
Cook	Steve Bredhauer	ALP	7.69%
Sandgate	Gordon Nuttall	ALP	7.89%
Capalaba	Jim Elder	ALP	8.73%
Waterford	Tom Barton	ALP	9.11%
Kedron	Paul Braddy	ALP	9.19%
Safe
Brisbane Central	Peter Beattie	ALP	10.28%
South Brisbane	Anna Bligh	ALP	10.69%
Nudgee	Neil Roberts	ALP	10.74%
Lytton	Tom Burns	ALP	11.31%
Bulimba	Pat Purcell	ALP	12.59%
Bundamba	Bob Gibbs	ALP	14.83%
Logan	Wayne Goss	ALP	16.92%
Woodridge	Bill D'Arcy	ALP	18.14%
Mount Isa	Tony McGrady	ALP	18.72%
Inala	Henry Palaszczuk	ALP	18.86%

National/Liberal seats (43)
Marginal
Greenslopes	Ted Radke	LIB	0.11%
Barron River	Lyn Warwick	LIB	0.39%
Mulgrave	Naomi Wilson	NAT	0.47%
Mount Ommaney	Bob Harper	LIB	1.68%
Albert	Bill Baumann	NAT	3.89%
Redlands	John Hegarty	NAT	4.59%
Southport	Mick Veivers	NAT	4.81%
Fairly Safe
Mansfield	Frank Carroll	LIB	6.70%
Burleigh	Judy Gamin	NAT	7.31%
Caloundra	Joan Sheldon	LIB	8.08%
Mirani	Ted Malone	NAT	9.07%
Aspley	John Goss	LIB	9.20%
Beaudesert	Kev Lingard	NAT	9.46%
Toowoomba North	Graham Healy	NAT	9.64%
Safe
Keppel	Vince Lester	NAT	10.35%
Burdekin	Mark Stoneman	NAT	10.57%
Springwood	Luke Woolmer	LIB	10.77%
Burnett	Doug Slack	NAT	11.09%
Broadwater	Allan Grice	NAT	11.20%
Noosa	Bruce Davidson	LIB	11.22%
Maroochydore	Fiona Simpson	NAT	12.26%
Gympie	Len Stephan	NAT	12.59%
Nicklin	Neil Turner	NAT	12.84%
Indooroopilly	Denver Beanland	LIB	13.25%
Nerang	Ray Connor	LIB	13.59%
Clayfield	Santo Santoro	LIB	14.17%
Hinchinbrook	Marc Rowell	NAT	14.71%
Merrimac	Bob Quinn	LIB	15.43%
Charters Towers	Rob Mitchell	NAT	15.60%
Toowoomba South	Mike Horan	NAT	16.28%
Moggill	David Watson	LIB	16.92%
Gregory	Vaughan Johnson	NAT	18.90%
Mooloolah	Bruce Laming	LIB	19.31%
Warwick	Lawrence Springborg	NAT	19.58%
Very Safe
Warrego	Howard Hobbs	NAT	20.69%
Lockyer	Tony Fitzgerald	NAT	20.82%
Surfers Paradise	Rob Borbidge	NAT	21.76%
Tablelands	Tom Gilmore	NAT	23.95%
Cunningham	Tony Elliott	NAT	23.80%
Barambah	Trevor Perrett	NAT	24.40%
Crows Nest	Russell Cooper	NAT	25.55%
Callide	Di McCauley	NAT	27.74%
Western Downs	Brian Littleproud	NAT	29.41%
Crossbench seats (1)
Gladstone	Liz Cunningham	IND	3.07% v ALP

== Subsequent changes ==
- On 8 December 1995, the Court of Disputed Returns declared the election in Mundingburra void and ordered a by-election. At the by-election on 3 February 1996, Frank Tanti gained the seat for the Liberal Party. This gave both the Labor Government and the National-Liberal Coalition 44 seats each, with 1 Independent. On 12 February, Independent Liz Cunningham announced her support for a National-Liberal Coalition minority government, and the Labor government resigned on 19 February.
- On 16 May 1996, former Labor Deputy Premier Tom Burns (Lytton) resigned. At the by-election on 5 October 1996, Paul Lucas retained the seat for the Labor Party.
- On 17 March 1997, Labor Party member Margaret Woodgate (Kurwongbah) resigned. At the by-election on 24 May 1997, Linda Lavarch retained the seat for the Labor Party.

== See also ==
- Candidates of the Queensland state election, 1995
- Members of the Queensland Legislative Assembly, 1992–1995
- Members of the Queensland Legislative Assembly, 1995–1998
- Goss Ministry
