= Peter Wear =

- Born: 1949 (age 76–77)
- Occupation: Newspaper Columnist

Peter Wear is a Brisbane-based writer whose columns appear regularly in The Courier-Mail. Wear ran a long-running satire on Queensland politics with the major role played by "President for Life Mbeattie" - a reference to Premier Peter Beattie's longevity in office.

Wear also wrote "The Madding of Daniel O'Hooligan" Published by University of Queensland Press in 1991.
