= Court of Disputed Returns (Queensland) =

Court that adjudicates election disputes in Queensland, Australia

Queensland Court of Disputed Returns
- Interactive map of Queensland Court of Disputed Returns
- 27°28′4″S 153°1′14″E
- Established: 1992
- Jurisdiction: Queensland, Australia
- Location: Brisbane
- Coordinates: 27°28′4″S 153°1′14″E
- Composition method: Vice-regal appointment upon nomination by the Premier following the advice of the Attorney-General and Cabinet
- Authorised by: Queensland Parliament via the Electoral Act 1992 (Qld)
- Appeals to: Court of Appeal, Supreme Court of Queensland
- Judge term length: mandatory retirement by age of 70
- Website: www.courts.qld.gov.au

Chief Justice of Queensland
- Currently: Helen Bowskill SC
- Since: 19 March 2022

The Queensland Court of Disputed Returns is a court that adjudicates disputes concerning Queensland Government and local government elections and state referendums in Queensland, Australia. The Court is a division of the Supreme Court of Queensland.

A disputed return occurs when the result of an election is questioned. The name disputed returns derives from the practice in common law countries of issuing a writ for the election and then the parliament receiving the results by way of returns after the counting of ballots. The court attempts to eliminate the partisan nature of parliament and gives the determination of electoral disputes to an independent and dispassionate, neutral body. As parliament traditionally has the sole authority to determine these matters, parliament must create a special law to bring that body into existence to determine those disputes. Where there is no law, the parliament itself determines these disputes. In the Queensland situation, the parliament has decided that the court should be the only avenue for disputing an election result.

The Court has no jurisdiction in Australian federal elections, where disputed returns are heard in the Federal Court of Australia or, on appeal, in the High Court of Australia.

== History ==
The Court's jurisdiction over disputed electoral returns can be traced to the practices of the United Kingdom Parliament. There were disputes between the Chancery Court and the House of Commons as to which body had the authority to determine who was rightly elected to Parliament. In 1770, the Grenville Act 1770 (UK) established a form of jury system in which a Select Committee of the House of Commons handled the determination of these disputes. Later, a committee of 11 members was chosen by ballot to report their decision to the House. In 1868, the Parliamentary Elections Act 1868 (UK) was passed, conferring jurisdiction on two judges of the Queen's Bench to determine these issues. The transfer of jurisdiction from Parliament to the courts was hastened by a concern with the partisanship of Parliament in ruling on electoral disputes. Essentially, voting along party lines made these disputes an exercise in the numbers rather than a determination on the merits.

== The Queensland situation ==
At the time of federation in 1901 in Australia, there was no uniform method of resolving election disputes. Western Australia and Tasmania had already transferred jurisdiction over disputed returns to their respective Supreme Courts. Queensland and South Australia alone had created hybrid tribunals. These tribunals were a mixture of politicians and judges who constituted them. Victoria and New South Wales retained the exclusive jurisdiction to determine disputed returns for themselves.

In 1867, Queensland had set up a parliamentary committee called the “Committee of Elections and Qualifications” to determine disputes. In 1886, Queensland set up an Elections Tribunal under the Elections Tribunal Act 1886 (Qld) and revoked the authority of the committee. This continued until 1915 when an election tribunal was set up constituted by a single judge under Elections Act 1915 (Qld) was created replacing the previous tribunal

In 1992 the election tribunal was disbanded. In its place, the Electoral Act 1992 (Qld) established the Court of Disputed Returns as a division of the Supreme Court; to mirror the legal situation in the Australian court hierarchy with the High Court of Australia and the situation in other states, such as with the Supreme Court of New South Wales. In effect, the Supreme Court exercises the jurisdiction of disputed returns, rather than actually as a special tribunal or as acting as persona designata.

== Procedure ==
A dispute about an election may be made by petition to the Supreme Court, which sits as the Court of Disputed Returns. The petition can be heard by a single judge or it can be heard by more than one judge depending on the nature of the petition. Generally, only a single judge hears the case. The petition can be made by a candidate at the election for the electoral district concerned, an elector for the electoral district concerned, a person who the Electoral Commission decided was not properly nominated, or the Electoral Commission itself. The petitioner must make the application within seven days and pay a filing fee. The court may conduct hearings or other proceedings in relation to the petition. It is not bound by technicalities, legal forms or rules of evidence. It must deal with the petition as quickly as is reasonable in the circumstances. Wherever possible, it must ensure that the petition hearing begins within 28 days after the petition is lodged and the court’s final orders are given within 14 days after the end of the proceeding. In making a decision, the Court must exercise its judgment according to its good conscience and according to what it considers to be the substantial merits of the case as to whether the respective common law or statutory criteria have been met. It permits resort to a common sense judgment in all the circumstances. However, the court's judgment cannot be merely arbitrary.

== Caseload ==
In 1995 the court heard its first petition under the new election laws. This was a petition concerning the return for the 1995 election of a member for the Electoral district of Mundingburra. The court noted that there were 22,035 enrolled voters, of which 2,513 did not cast a vote. Of those votes, 287 were informal votes. On the remaining 19,235 votes, the petitioner received 8,541 first preference votes whilst the elected person received 8,429 votes. The voting then went to preferences. On second preferences, the petitioner received 751 of those second preference votes and the elected person received 879 votes. This meant that the elected person received 9,308 votes whilst the petitioner received 9,292 votes. The end result was the elected person was elected by a majority of 16 votes. The court analysed the voting process and determined that there were 35 instances of invalid voting or correct voting which had been rejected. In the circumstances, the Justice Ambrose ordered a fresh election for the electorate of Mundingburra.

In the same year, the court also determined a preliminary issue for a petition concerning the election return for the Electoral district of Greenslopes. In that case, the petitioner alleged that the Electoral Commission has not followed procedures in counting declaration votes, and as a result, the whole election for Greenslopes should be declared as invalid. The court dismissed the application noting that even if it was correct, the number of informal would total 3,504 votes instead of 420 votes, and the elected person would have received 8,143 votes as against the petitioner’s 7,946 votes.

In 1998, the court heard a petition concerning the election held on 13 June 1998 of a member of parliament for the Electoral district of Mansfield. The petitioner was the former sitting member representing the Liberals whilst the Labor candidate was declared elected. The petition alleged that a how to vote card was handed out by Labor party workers to voters for the One Nation Party (ONP), which directed second preferences to Labor. The how to vote card was a Labor authorised card rather than an ONP authorised card. In the circumstances of the dispute, the court dismissed the petition.

In 2001 and 2004, a person declared by the Supreme Court of Queensland to be vexatious, attempted to bring a case in the Court of Disputed Returns against the Premier of Queensland, Peter Beattie. The basis of his applications was a “remedy of long standing defects in respect of the manner in which the State and Nation’s affairs” are conducted, or in other words, that the Queensland Government was unconstitutional. The basis of his application was that the legal tender of money could only be made in coins made of gold (and not paper money or ordinary coins), and secondly, that the whole of the Queensland Government was invalid as a change to the governor’s office was not approved by way of a referendum. The person was not permitted to bring the petition, and the presiding judge, Justice Chesterman wryly noted that he could not understand why the applicant was petitioning the court to be elected to a parliament which he claimed was actually invalid.

== Appeals ==
Generally courts of disputed returns have no rights of appeal. In the Queensland situation, there is a limited right of appeal to the Court of Appeal on a question of law. This appeal must be lodged within seven days.

== Sources ==
- Orr, Graeme and Williams, George. “Electoral Challenges: Judicial Review of Parliamentary Elections in Australia” (2001) 23 SLR 53
- Walker, Kristen. “Disputed Returns and Parliamentary Qualifications: Is the High Court's Jurisdiction Constitutional” (1997) 20 UNSWLJ. 257
- Geiringer, Claudia. “Judging the Politicians: A Case for Judicial Determination of Disputes over the Membership of the House of Representatives” (2005) 3 NZJPIL 139.
- McGrath, Amy. "Chapter Seven "One Vote, One Value : Electoral Fraud in Australia"". Proceedings of the Eighth Conference of The Samuel Griffith Society. Archived from the original on 13 October 2009.
- Orr, Graeme; Mercurio, Bryan; Williams, George (2003). "Australian Electoral Law: A Stocktake" (PDF). ELJ. Archived from the original (PDF) on 30 August 2007.
