= Electoral Commission of Queensland =

Government agency in Queensland, Australia

Commission overview
- Formed: 1992
- Jurisdiction: Queensland Government
- Headquarters: Brisbane
- Employees: 58
- Minister responsible: Deb Frecklington, Attorney-General and Minister for Justice
- Commission executives: Patrick Vidgen, Electoral Commissioner; Wade Lewis, Assistant Electoral Commissioner
- Parent department: Department of Justice and Attorney-General
- Key document: Electoral Act 1992
- Website: ecq.qld.gov.au

The Electoral Commission of Queensland (ECQ) is established under the Electoral Act 1992 as an independent statutory authority, responsible for the impartial conduct of state and local government elections in Queensland.

== Functions ==
The commission has three main functions. It must administer Queensland's electoral laws, conduct democratic parliamentary and industrial elections which are free and review local government boundaries. It is also responsible for referendums, electoral redistributions, education and research into matters related to Queensland elections, providing information to all levels of government, ensuring the electoral roll is maintained and the registering of political parties.

== Electronic voting ==
In 2010, the commission announced it was conducting research into assisting the deaf and blind to cast a secret vote electronically. However, due to legislative restrictions, electronic voting was not available for the 2012 state election.

== See also ==
- Australian Electoral Commission
- Court of Disputed Returns
- Electoral districts of Queensland
- Politics of Queensland
