= 1998 Queensland state election =

- 13 June 1998

All 89 seats in the Legislative Assembly of Queensland 45 seats needed for a majority
- Opinion polls
- Registered: 2,115,977 ▲5.41%
- Turnout: 1,964,778 (92.85%) (▲1.42 pp)
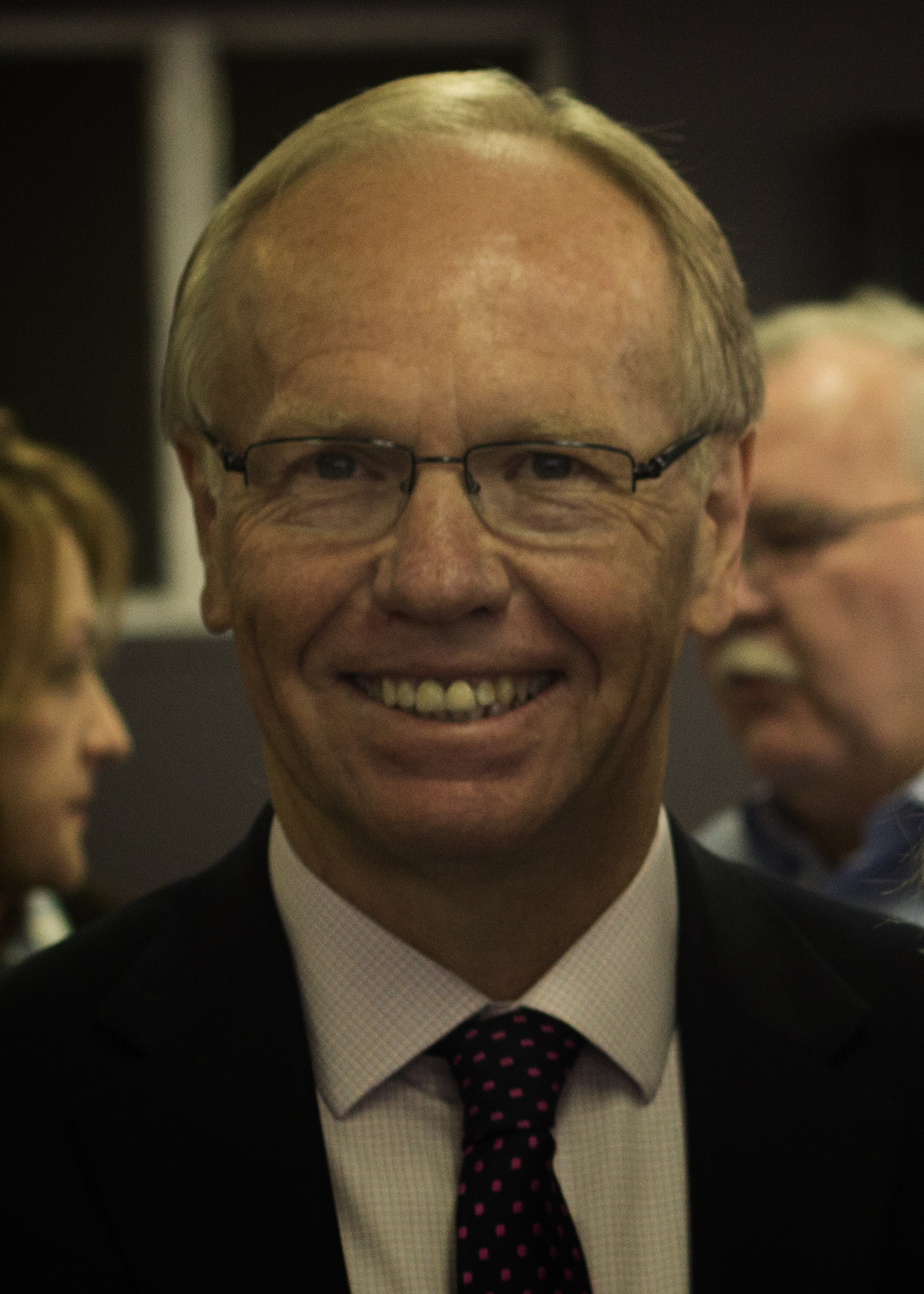

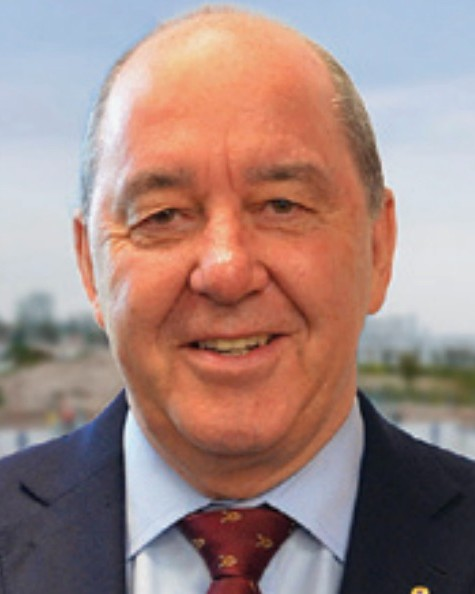

	First party	Second party	Third party
Leader	Peter Beattie	Rob Borbidge	Heather Hill
Party	Labor	National–Liberal coalition	One Nation
Leader since	20 February 1996	10 December 1991	21 May 1998
Leader's seat	Brisbane Central	Surfers Paradise	None (contested Ipswich)
Last election	45 seats, 42.89%	43 seats, 48.99%	Did not exist
Seats before	44	44	0 seats
Seats won	44	32	11
Seat change	Steady	▼12	▲11
Primary vote	773,585	605,353	439,121
Percentage	38.86%	31.26%	22.68%
Swing	▼4.03	▼17.73	▲22.68
- The top map shows the first party preference by electorate. The bottom map shows the final two-party preferred vote result by electorate.
Premier before election
Rob Borbidge
National–Liberal Coalition
Resulting Premier
Peter Beattie
Labor

The 1998 Queensland state election was held on 13 June 1998 to elect all 89 members of the Legislative Assembly of Queensland.

The result of the election was a second consecutive hung parliament, with the Labor Party forming minority government after receiving the support of independent Peter Wellington. This election was the first in which One Nation supporters were elected to state Parliament, with the controversial party winning 11 seats. With nearly 23% of the vote, One Nation gained a higher percentage of the vote than any other third party (i.e. not Labor, Coalition, or independents) at the state or territory level since Federation. This was also the only election at which a third party gained more votes than both the Liberal Party and the National Party considered separately. Unlike in previous elections, no attempt was made to calculate the statewide two-party preferred vote (2PP), because the One Nation vote was so high that any 2PP result would have been meaningless.

A few months after the election, the One Nation member for Mulgrave, Charles Rappolt resigned. Labor won the ensuing by-election, allowing it to form government with a bare majority of 45 seats.

The fact that the Coalition Government came to office as a direct result of the 1996 Mundingburra by-election instead of the general election the previous year, as well as its failure to win in its own right at the 1998 election, meant that the 1998 election was the fourth consecutive election victory for the Queensland Branch of the ALP, which had won every election since 1989.

== Background ==
The previous state election (1995) had resulted in one of the narrowest margins of any Australian election. The National–Liberal Coalition won a slim majority of the two-party vote. However, the Coalition's majority was wasted on massive landslides in its rural heartland, while Labor won 31 seats in Brisbane. Labor Premier Wayne Goss' government thus clung to life by a single seat. This was brought undone when the Court of Disputed Returns ordered a new election in the disputed seat of Mundingburra, which the Liberals won on a modest swing. The balance of power rested with newly elected Independent MLA Liz Cunningham, who announced her support for the Coalition. Goss resigned, and Nationals leader Rob Borbidge was appointed as Premier.

The Borbidge government's popularity suffered in the later part of its term due to the federal Howard government's GST plans. Seeking to create a more definite majority, Borbidge called a new election on 19 May 1998. Although early polling showed the government to be strongly competitive with Labor, led by Peter Beattie, later polls saw Labor gain a substantial lead.

However, the debate between the two parties was rapidly sidelined by One Nation's emerging support. Formed in 1997 by federal Independent MP for Oxley Pauline Hanson, One Nation gained significant support on a platform of economic nationalism, anti-immigration sentiments and opposition to native title. Its platform was particularly well received in the Nationals' heartland of rural Queensland; indeed, at the time the writs were dropped, there had been fears over the past two years that One Nation would sweep the Nationals out of existence. One Nation stood candidates in 79 seats, all largely political novices. The issue of preference allocations to One Nation, under Queensland's optional preferential voting (OPV) system, became a major campaign issue, with eventual poor results for the Liberals attributed to opposition from many of their traditional voters over their decision not to put One Nation last on preferences.

Borbidge had been well aware of the threat from One Nation. He tried to have One Nation preferenced last on Coalition how-to-vote cards. However, the national Liberal and National organisations pressured their Queensland counterparts to preference One Nation ahead of Labor. They apparently thought that One Nation's populism would peel off enough Labor voters to allow the Coalition to win another term.

One Nation won 11 seats and finished second (after preferences) in 23 seats. Seven of One Nation's seats would have gone to Labor had it not been for leakage of Coalition preferences; had Labor won those seats, it would have been able to form government in its own right.

== Key dates ==
Date	Event
19 May 1998	Writs were issued by the Governor to proceed with an election.
23 May 1998	Close of electoral rolls.
26 May 1998	Close of nominations.
13 June 1998	Polling day, between the hours of 8am and 6pm.
25 June 1998	Peter Wellington announced that he would support a minority Labor government.
26 June 1998	The Borbidge Ministry resigned and the interim Beattie Ministry was sworn in.
29 June 1998	The full Beattie Ministry was sworn in.
27 July 1998	The writ was returned and the results formally declared.

== Retiring members ==
=== Labor ===
- Len Ardill MLA (Archerfield)
- Clem Campbell MLA (Bundaberg)
- Keith De Lacy MLA (Cairns)
- Wayne Goss MLA (Logan)
- Glen Milliner MLA (Ferny Grove)
- Geoff Smith MLA (Townsville)

=== National ===
- Di McCauley MLA (Callide)
- Mark Stoneman MLA (Burdekin)

== Results ==
Winning party by electorate.

Percentage of first preference votes for One Nation in each electorate.

Candidates finishing in second place on a two-candidate-preferred basis (after full distribution of preferences) in each electorate.

Party	Votes	%	+/–	Seats	+/–
Labor	752,374	38.86	▼4.03	44	▼1
One Nation	439,121	22.68	New	11	New
Liberal	311,514	16.09	▼6.65	9	▼5
National	293,839	15.17	▼11.08	23	▼6
Independents	41,991	2.17	▼1.30	2	▲1
Greens	45,709	2.36	▼0.51	0	0
Democrats	31,119	1.61	▲0.36	0	0
Australia First	9,560	0.49	New	0	New
Reform	7,658	0.40	New	0	0
Christian Democrats	2,098	0.11	New	0	New
Shooters	1,058	0.05	New	0	New
Women's	299	0.02	New	0	0
Total	1,936,340	100.00	–	89	–
Valid votes	1,936,340	98.55			
Invalid/blank votes	28,438	1.45	▼0.30		
Total votes	1,964,778	100.00	–		
Registered voters/turnout	2,115,977	92.85	▲1.42		

Popular vote
Labor	38.86%
One Nation	22.68%
Liberal	16.09%
Nationals	15.17%
Greens	2.36%
Democrats	1.61%
Australia First	0.49%
Reform	0.40%
Christian Democrats	0.11%
Shooters	0.05%
Women's Party	0.01%
Independents	2.17%

Seats
Labor	49.44%
Nationals	25.84%
One Nation	12.36%
Liberal	10.11%
Independents	2.25%

== Seats changing hands ==
Seat	1995 Election			Swing	1998 Election		
Seat	Party	Member	Margin	Swing	Margin	Member	Party
Barambah	National	Trevor Perrett	24.40	–30.26	5.85	Dorothy Pratt	One Nation
Barron River	Liberal	Lyn Warwick	0.39	–1.02	0.63	Lesley Clark	Labor
Burdekin	National	Mark Stoneman	10.57	–19.98	9.42	Jeff Knuth	One Nation
Caboolture	Labor	Jon Sullivan	2.27	–4.96	2.69	Bill Feldman	One Nation
Greenslopes	Liberal	Ted Radke	0.11	–5.28	5.17	Gary Fenlon	Labor
Hervey Bay	Labor	Bill Nunn	1.92	–7.20	5.28	David Dalgleish	One Nation
Ipswich West	Labor	Don Livingstone	5.49	–7.35	1.85	Jack Paff	One Nation
Lockyer	National	Tony Fitzgerald	20.82	–24.49	3.68	Peter Prenzler	One Nation
Mansfield	Liberal	Frank Carroll	6.70	–6.87	0.17	Phil Reeves	Labor
Maryborough	Labor	Bob Dollin	0.37	–8.70	8.32	John Kingston	One Nation
Mount Ommaney	Liberal	Bob Harper	1.68	–3.63	1.95	Julie Attwood	Labor
Mulgrave	National	Naomi Wilson	0.47	–4.61	4.15	Charles Rappolt	One Nation
Mundingburra	Liberal	Frank Tanti¹	2.79	–6.59	3.81	Lindy Nelson-Carr	Labor
Nicklin	National	Neil Turner	12.84	–18.58	5.73	Peter Wellington	Independent
Springwood	Liberal	Luke Woolmer	10.77	–11.33	0.57	Grant Musgrove	Labor
Tablelands	National	Tom Gilmore	22.95	–23.23	0.28	Shaun Nelson	One Nation
Thuringowa	Labor	Ken McElligott	1.34	–7.97	6.63	Ken Turner	One Nation
Whitsunday	Labor	Lorraine Bird	0.13	–1.87	1.73	Harry Black	One Nation

- Members listed in italics did not contest their seats at this election.
- ¹ Frank Tanti gained Mundingburra for the Liberal Party at the 1996 by-election. The Labor Party had retained the seat at the 1995 election.

== Post-election pendulum ==
Government seats (44)
Marginal
Mansfield	Phil Reeves	ALP	0.17%
Springwood	Grant Musgrove	ALP	0.57%
Barron River	Lesley Clark	ALP	0.63%
Mount Ommaney	Julie Attwood	ALP	1.95%
Bundaberg	Nita Cunningham	ALP	2.05% v ONP
Cairns	Desley Boyle	ALP	2.26% v ONP
Redcliffe	Ray Hollis	ALP	2.31%
Currumbin	Merri Rose	ALP	2.78%
Ipswich	David Hamill	ALP	3.42% v ONP
Mundingburra	Lindy Nelson-Carr	ALP	3.81%
Kallangur	Ken Hayward	ALP	3.91% v ONP
Murrumba	Dean Wells	ALP	5.04% v ONP
Greenslopes	Gary Fenlon	ALP	5.17%
Waterford	Tom Barton	ALP	5.21% v ONP
Everton	Rod Welford	ALP	5.99%
Fairly safe
Ashgrove	Jim Fouras	ALP	6.10%
Bundamba	Bob Gibbs	ALP	6.22% v ONP
Cleveland	Darryl Briskey	ALP	6.42%
Mackay	Tim Mulherin	ALP	6.53% v ONP
Mount Gravatt	Judy Spence	ALP	7.17%
Townsville	Mike Reynolds	ALP	7.74%
Sunnybank	Stephen Robertson	ALP	8.18%
Logan	John Mickel	ALP	8.42% v ONP
Ferny Grove	Geoff Wilson	ALP	8.58%
Chatsworth	Terry Mackenroth	ALP	8.70%
Chermside	Terry Sullivan	ALP	9.02%
Rockhampton	Robert Schwarten	ALP	9.61% v ONP
Safe
Mount Coot-tha	Wendy Edmond	ALP	10.51%
Fitzroy	Jim Pearce	ALP	10.72% v ONP
Archerfield	Karen Struthers	ALP	11.71%
Yeronga	Matt Foley	ALP	12.47%
Kurwongbah	Linda Lavarch	ALP	13.21%
Woodridge	Bill D'Arcy	ALP	13.52% v ONP
Capalaba	Jim Elder	ALP	13.72%
Kedron	Paul Braddy	ALP	14.07%
Brisbane Central	Peter Beattie	ALP	15.15%
Cook	Steve Bredhauer	ALP	15.52% v ONP
Mount Isa	Tony McGrady	ALP	15.62% v ONP
Sandgate	Gordon Nuttall	ALP	15.99%
South Brisbane	Anna Bligh	ALP	16.29%
Lytton	Paul Lucas	ALP	17.42%
Nudgee	Neil Roberts	ALP	17.45%
Bulimba	Pat Purcell	ALP	19.51%
Very safe
Inala	Henry Palaszczuk	ALP	27.39%

Opposition seats (32)
Marginal
Indooroopilly	Denver Beanland	LIB	0.67%
Crows Nest	Russell Cooper	NAT	0.88% v ONP
Redlands	John Hegarty	NAT	0.98%
Gympie	Len Stephan	NAT	1.70% v ONP
Aspley	John Goss	LIB	1.77%
Callide	Jeff Seeney	NAT	2.28% v ONP
Burnett	Doug Slack	NAT	2.33% v ONP
Mirani	Ted Malone	NAT	2.70%
Keppel	Vince Lester	NAT	3.60%
Charters Towers	Rob Mitchell	NAT	3.71%
Southport	Mick Veivers	NAT	3.75%
Beaudesert	Kev Lingard	NAT	4.09%
Albert	Bill Baumann	NAT	4.83%
Fairly safe
Clayfield	Santo Santoro	LIB	6.55%
Toowoomba North	Graham Healy	NAT	8.20%
Burleigh	Judy Gamin	NAT	8.45%
Hinchinbrook	Marc Rowell	NAT	8.56% v ONP
Cunningham	Tony Elliott	NAT	8.85% v ONP
Moggill	David Watson	LIB	8.93%
Western Downs	Brian Littleproud	NAT	9.42% v ONP
Broadwater	Allan Grice	NAT	9.77%
Noosa	Bruce Davidson	LIB	9.86%
Safe
Caloundra	Joan Sheldon	LIB	10.67%
Nerang	Ray Connor	LIB	11.00%
Warwick	Lawrence Springborg	NAT	11.85% v ONP
Gregory	Vaughan Johnson	NAT	13.08%
Toowoomba South	Mike Horan	NAT	13.36%
Merrimac	Bob Quinn	LIB	14.69%
Maroochydore	Fiona Simpson	NAT	15.05% v ONP
Warrego	Howard Hobbs	NAT	15.32%
Mooloolah	Bruce Laming	LIB	15.93%
Very safe
Surfers Paradise	Rob Borbidge	NAT	22.26%
Crossbench seats (13)
Tablelands	Shaun Nelson	ONP	0.28% v NAT
Gladstone	Liz Cunningham	IND	1.36% v ALP
Whitsunday	Harry Black	ONP	1.73% v ALP
Ipswich West	Jack Paff	ONP	1.85% v ALP
Caboolture	Bill Feldman	ONP	2.69% v ALP
Lockyer	Peter Prenzler	ONP	3.68% v NAT
Mulgrave	Charles Rappolt	ONP	4.15% v ALP
Hervey Bay	David Dalgleish	ONP	5.28% v ALP
Nicklin	Peter Wellington	IND	5.73% v NAT
Barambah	Dorothy Pratt	ONP	5.85% v NAT
Thuringowa	Ken Turner	ONP	6.63% v ALP
Maryborough	John Kingston	ONP	8.32% v ALP
Burdekin	Jeff Knuth	ONP	9.42% v ALP

== Subsequent changes ==
- On 4 November 1998, One Nation Party member Charles Rappolt (Mulgrave) resigned. At the by-election on 5 December 1998, Warren Pitt gained the seat for the Labor Party. This gave Labor 45 seats, enough for a majority government.
- On 6 February 1999, the One Nation Party members Shaun Nelson (Tablelands), Dorothy Pratt (Barambah), and Ken Turner (Thuringowa) resigned from the party and sat as independents.
- On 23 February 1999, the One Nation Party members John Kingston (Maryborough) and Jeff Knuth (Burdekin) resigned from the party and sat as independents. On 18 February 2000, Jeff Knuth (Burdekin) joined the City Country Alliance.
- On 22 December 1999, the One Nation Party members Harry Black (Whitsunday), David Dalgleish (Hervey Bay), Bill Feldman (Caboolture), Jack Paff (Ipswich West), and Peter Prenzler (Lockyer) resigned from the party and formed the City Country Alliance.
- On 14 December 1999, the Labor Party member Bob Gibbs (Bundamba) resigned. At the by-election on 5 February 2000, Jo-Ann Miller retained the seat for the Labor Party.
- On 9 January 2000, the Labor Party member Bill D'Arcy (Woodridge) resigned. At the by-election on 5 February 2000, Mike Kaiser retained the seat for the Labor Party.
- On 30 November 2000, Deputy Premier Jim Elder (Capalaba) resigned from the Labor Party and sat as an independent.
- On 4 December 2000, Grant Musgrove (Springwood) resigned from the Labor Party and sat as an independent.
- On 10 January 2001, Mike Kaiser (Woodridge) resigned from the Labor Party and sat as an independent.

== Opinion polling ==
Although the Coalition government initially enjoyed strong levels of support subsequent to assuming office in 1996, support was quickly lost. From 1997, Labor opened a consistent, albeit narrow, lead in the polls and by 1998 Labor was enjoying a commanding lead. The Coalition was eventually disadvantaged by what was commonly deemed to be poor government performance and the rapid rise of One Nation support, which under the state's optional preferential voting, fractured the conservative vote. The Coalition vote significantly plummeted, whilst Labor essentially withstood the swing to One Nation.

Legislative Assembly opinion polling
	Primary vote
Date	L/NP	ALP	ONP	OTH
1998 election	31.3%	38.9%	22.7%	7.1%
10–11 Jun 1998	33%	41.5%	18.5%	7%
29–31 May 1998	34%	44%	15%	7%
Apr–May 1998	39%	41%	10%	10%
Jan–Mar 1998	39%	41%	5%	15%
Oct–Dec 1997	38%	43%		19%
Jul–Sep 1997	41%	40%		19%
Apr–Jun 1997	41%	41%		18%
Jan–Mar 1997	41%	44%		15%
Oct–Dec 1996	46%	41%		13%
Jul–Sep 1996	49%	42%		9%
1995 election	49.0%	42.9%		8.1%

== See also ==
- Candidates of the Queensland state election, 1998
- Members of the Queensland Legislative Assembly, 1995–1998
- Members of the Queensland Legislative Assembly, 1998–2001
- Borbidge Ministry
- Beattie Ministry
