= Janelle Poole =

Australian politician

Janelle Poole APM, MP

Member of the Queensland Legislative Assembly for Mundingburra
- Incumbent
- Assumed office 26 October 2024
- Preceded by: Les Walker

Personal details
- Party: Liberal National
- Occupation: Police officer

Janelle Maree Poole APM is an Australian politician. She was elected member of the Legislative Assembly of Queensland for Mundingburra in the 2024 Queensland state election.

Poole was born in Townsville, raised in the suburb of Cranbrook and was educated at Aitkenvale State School and Heatley State High School.

Poole joined the Queensland Police Service in 1996, and was awarded the Australian Police Medal by the governor general in 2015.
