= 1996 Lytton state by-election =

Legislative Assembly of Queensland election

A by-election was held in the Legislative Assembly of Queensland seat of Lytton on 5 October 1996. It was triggered by the resignation of sitting Labor member Tom Burns. The by-election was won by Labor candidate Paul Lucas.

== Result ==
Lytton state by-election, 1996
Party	Candidate	Votes	%	±%
Labor	Paul Lucas	10,832	54.7	−1.5
Liberal	Jenny Mansell	5,480	27.7	−7.3
Democrats	Marianne Dickie	1,223	6.2	+6.2
Shooters	Wendy Kelly	750	3.8	+3.8
Independent	Nigel Freemarijuana	608	3.1	+3.1
Greens	Norma Nord	570	2.9	−5.9
Independent	B Groom	147	0.7	+0.7
Independent	B Richardson	131	0.7	+0.7
Independent	Steve Purtill	47	0.2	+0.2
Total formal votes		19,788	98.9	+0.4
Informal votes		229	1.1	−0.4
Turnout		20,017	88.1	
Two-party-preferred result
Labor	Paul Lucas	11,952	66.1	+4.8
Liberal	Jenny Mansell	6,129	33.9	−4.8
Labor hold		Swing	+4.8	

== See also ==
- List of Queensland state by-elections
