= Les Walker (politician) =

Australian politician (born 1965)

Member of the Queensland Legislative Assembly for Mundingburra
- In office 31 October 2020 – 26 October 2024
- Preceded by: Coralee O'Rourke
- Succeeded by: Janelle Poole

Deputy Mayor of Townsville
- In office 12 May 2016 – 26 April 2020
- Leader: Jenny Hill
- Succeeded by: Mark Molachino

Councillor of the City of Townsville for Division 10
- In office 28 April 2012 – 24 November 2020
- Preceded by: New division
- Succeeded by: Fran O'Callaghan

Personal details
- Born: 15 January 1965 (age 61)
- Party: Labor
- Other political affiliations: Team Jenny Hill (until 2020)
- Spouse: Kaylene Walker
- Children: 2
- Occupation: Small business owner

Leslie Alexander Walker (born 15 January 1965) is an Australian politician who served as the member for Mundingburra in the Queensland Legislative Assembly for one term from 2020 until his defeat at the 2024 state election. He served as a Townsville City councillor from 2004, and was Deputy Mayor of Townsville from 2016 to 2020.

Walker won preselection for Mundingburra following the retirement of the sitting member, Labor frontbencher Coralee O'Rourke.

On 16 January 2021, Walker was knocked unconscious at Townsville's Mad Cow Tavern nightclub while celebrating his 56th birthday. Police issued Walker with an $800 public nuisance infringement notice and was banned from the city's pubs, nightclubs and restaurants for a period of 10 days. No charges were laid.

On 30 July 2021, Walker was charged with common assault on a former independent candidate at the 2017 Queensland state election for the Thuringowa electorate, Stephen Lane, who is the son of a former Thuringowa City and Townsville City Councillor Jenny Lane.

Walker appeared in the Townsville Magistrates Court on 13 August 2021. Walker did not enter a plea, but said outside the court that he would contest the charges.

On 27 August, Walker's lawyer appeared on his behalf and entered no plea, simply stating that the case is “subject to case conferencing". The matter was adjourned to 3 September 2021.

Premier Annastacia Palaszczuk stated she was "disappointed" by the events, and confirmed that Walker had agreed to stand down from his role on the Transport and Resources Committee and from his role as a Temporary Speaker."

On 5 November, Walker was acquitted, with a magistrate describing the case as a "waste of time". Walker subsequently resumed his parliamentary roles, including as a member of the Transport and Resources Committee.

Parliament of Queensland
Preceded by Coralee O'Rourke	Member for Mundingburra; 2020–2024	Succeeded by Janelle Poole
