= Lindy Nelson-Carr =

Australian politician

Member of the Queensland Legislative Assembly for Mundingburra
- In office 13 June 1998 – 23 March 2012
- Preceded by: Frank Tanti
- Succeeded by: David Crisafulli

Personal details
- Born: 15 July 1959 (age 66) Sydney, New South Wales, Australia
- Party: Labor
- Occupation: Teacher

Lindel Helena Nelson-Carr (born 15 July 1952) is a former Australian politician who was the member of the Legislative Assembly of Queensland for Mundingburra from 1998 until she stood down at the 2012 state election.

== Parliamentary career ==
Nelson-Carr was elected as Member for Mundingburra in the Parliament of Queensland at the election on 13 June 1998, when she achieved a swing of 6.7 per cent away from sitting Liberal MP Frank Tanti.

She increased her margin to 10.54 per cent at the 2006 election; this result went against the statewide trend of a slight swing against Labor. Four days after the election, on 13 September 2006, Nelson-Carr was promoted to the Cabinet in the Beattie Ministry as Minister for Environment and Multiculturalism. A year later, when Anna Bligh became Premier, Nelson-Carr was moved to the portfolio of Minister for Communities, Disability Services, Aboriginal and Torres Strait Island Partnerships, Multicultural Affairs, Seniors and Youth.

Before being appointed to Cabinet, Nelson-Carr was from 2001 the Parliamentary Secretary to the Minister for Health and Minister Assisting the Premier on Women's Policy. She was promoted in 2004 to Parliamentary Secretary to the Premier for North Queensland. Her portfolio was expanded in 2005 to include Parliamentary Secretary to the Minister for Transport and Main Roads.

On 28 March 2011, Nelson-Carr announced that she would not contest the 2012 state election.

== Personal ==
Ms Nelson-Carr was a high school teacher and guidance officer at Townsville State High School and Pimlico State High School. She holds a master of education, and from 1993 to 1998 lectured in human relationships education at James Cook University. Before moving to Townsville she taught in inner Sydney schools.

Her husband Russel Carr and she have five children.

== Affiliations ==
Ms Nelson-Carr established a Townsville branch of EMILY's List and holds fundraisers regularly to contribute to the organisation. She is supported by the organisation and received EMILY's List funding to support her first election to Parliament. She is historically the most senior female politician to be elected in Townsville.

She is a proud trade unionist and is a member of the Queensland Teachers Union and the Australasian Meat Industry Employees Union. At the time she praised workers involved in the 1998 Australian waterfront dispute.

"...they were sacked as a result of a national collusion between the coalition parties and Patrick stevedores. They were sacked because they were members of a union. They were sacked because they chose to be loyal to themselves, their union and their workmates.

Parliament of Queensland
Preceded by Frank Tanti	Member for Mundingburra; 1998–2012	Succeeded by David Crisafulli
