= Electoral district of Mundingburra =

State electoral district of Queensland, Australia

Mundingburra Queensland—Legislative Assembly
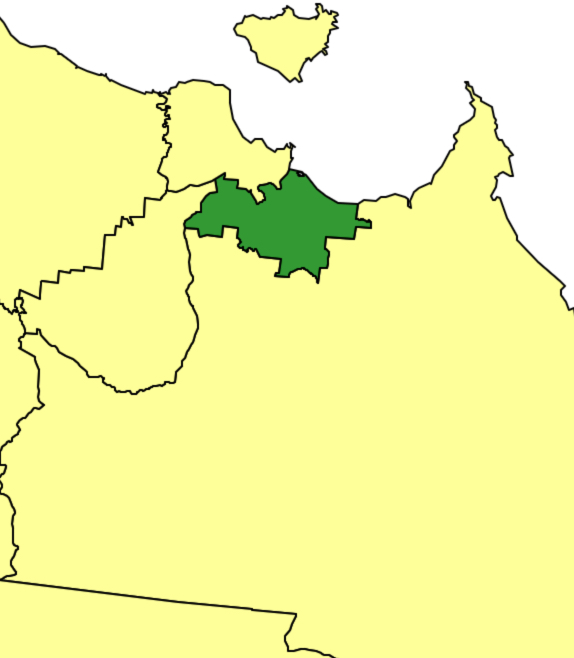
- Map of the electoral district of Mundingburra, 2024
- State: Queensland
- MP: Janelle Poole
- Party: Liberal National
- Namesake: Mundingburra
- Electors: 33,405 (2020)
- Area: 122 km^{2} (47.1 sq mi)
- Demographic: Provincial
- Coordinates: 19°18′S 146°46′E
Electorates around Mundingburra:
Townsville	Townsville	Coral Sea
Thuringowa	Mundingburra	Burdekin
Thuringowa	Burdekin	Burdekin

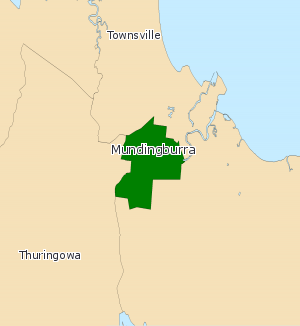
2008 map

Mundingburra is an electoral district of the Legislative Assembly in the Australian state of Queensland. It is currently held by Liberal National MP Janelle Poole.

== Overview ==
The seat is one of four within the Townsville urban area in North Queensland. Significant utilities within the Mundingburra electorate are the Townsville Hospital, the Douglas Campus of James Cook University and Townsville Shopping Centre. Suburbs of the electorate include Heatley, Cranbrook, Aitkenvale, Mundingburra, Vincent, Douglas, Annandale, Gulliver, Mysterton, Rosslea, part of Kirwan and Pimlico north of the Ross River.

Mundingburra is bordered by the Burdekin (south), Townsville (north and east) and Thuringowa (west) electorates.

== Electoral history ==
The first incarnation of the Mundingburra electorate was created at the 1911 redistribution, encompassing parts of the former electorates of Herbert and Bowen. It was a historically Australian Labor Party seat, but from 1944 onwards was held by North Queensland Labor Party MP Tom Aikens. It changed significantly in a 1949 redistribution, and was abolished in 1959, with most of the district becoming part of the new Townsville South electorate.

== 1996 by-election ==
The Mundingburra electoral district attracted national attention and headlines in early 1996 with a by-election called after the Court of Disputed Returns declared the result in the seat from July 1995 election void. The result had taken over a week to determine and ended up with the incumbent member, Ken Davies of the Labor Party, winning by 16 votes. This gave the Goss government a one-seat majority in Parliament - 45 seats to the Coalition's 43 and one conservative-leaning independent, Liz Cunningham. Davies was subsequently appointed as Minister for Emergency Services and Consumer Affairs.

The Liberals challenged the result in August and on 8 December, the court ordered a new election, partly on the basis that administrative difficulties had deprived several military personnel serving in Rwanda of their vote. It was generally understood that the fate of the Goss government likely rested on the result, and Goss himself was prominent in it, announcing amongst other things a A$1 billion Korean zinc smelter for Townsville and asking voters to end the uncertainty "bedevilling" the Queensland political system. An expected federal election in March 1996 where the unpopular Keating government (also Labor) would face the voters was a key feature in the background.

Things became somewhat chaotic when Labor, on the basis of internal polling data and a legal case between Davies and the Commonwealth Bank, decided to drop Davies as its endorsed candidate, selecting Tony Mooney, the mayor of Townsville in his place. Davies reacted angrily, ultimately running as an independent and generating a considerable level of media publicity. A total of 12 candidates supporting a raft of causes ended up nominating by the draw of ballot papers on 12 January. On 25 January, Keating called the federal election for 2 March, which Goss described as an "outside distraction".

Contradictory polls generally suggested the Coalition would win, although a late poll by AGB McNair two days before polling day suggested Labor could still win. However, on the day, a swing of 2.83% to the Liberals saw their candidate Frank Tanti, a shop manager and committed Christian who had run a low-level doorknocking campaign for months, win the by-election. Within days, it became clear that Independent Liz Cunningham would support the Coalition, and the Goss government resigned, allowing Rob Borbidge to form a minority government which lasted until the 1998 election. At that election, Labor, under Peter Beattie, won back both Mundingburra and governing party status.

== Members for Mundingburra ==
First incarnation (1912–1960)
Member	Party	Term
Thomas Foley	Labor	1912–1920
John Dash	Labor	1920–1944
Tom Aikens	North Queensland Labor	1944–1960
Second incarnation (1992–present)
Member	Party	Term
Ken Davies	Labor	1992–1995
Frank Tanti	Liberal	1996–1998
Lindy Nelson-Carr	Labor	1998–2012
David Crisafulli	Liberal National	2012–2015
Coralee O'Rourke	Labor	2015–2020
Les Walker	Labor	2020–2024
Janelle Poole	Liberal National	2024–present

== Election results ==
2024 Queensland state election: Mundingburra
Party	Candidate	Votes	%	±%
Liberal National	Janelle Poole	13,020	44.36	+11.96
Labor	Les Walker	8,864	30.20	−8.10
Katter's Australian	Michael Pugh	3,808	12.97	+0.87
Greens	Rebecca Haley	2,255	7.68	+0.78
One Nation	Mick Olsen	1,405	4.79	+0.19
Total formal votes		29,352	96.02	
Informal votes		1,089	3.58	
Turnout		30,441	86.63	
Two-party-preferred result
Liberal National	Janelle Poole	17,380	59.21	+13.11
Labor	Les Walker	11,972	40.79	−13.11
Liberal National gain from Labor		Swing	+13.11	

Primary vote results in Mundingburra (Second Incarnation) (Parties that have never gotten 5% of the vote are omitted)
Labor
Liberal National

Liberal
National

Greens
Katter's Australian
One Nation
Palmer United/United Australia Party
Australian Democrats
View source data.
Two-candidate-preferred vote results in Mundingburra (Second Incarnation) View source data.
