= Frank Tanti =

Australian politician

Member of the Queensland Legislative Assembly for Mundingburra
- In office 3 February 1996 – 13 June 1998
- Preceded by: Ken Davies
- Succeeded by: Lindy Nelson-Carr

Personal details
- Born: Francis John Tanti; 13 August 1949 (age 76) Adelaide, South Australia, Australia
- Party: Liberal Party
- Occupation: Cabinet maker

Francis John Tanti (born 13 August 1949) is a former Australian politician.

Born in Adelaide, he became a cabinet-maker, eventually moving to Queensland. A member of the Liberal Party from August 1993, he ran unsuccessfully for Townsville City Council in 1994 and for the state seat of Mundingburra at the 1995 state election. He was North Queensland Liberal of the Year (1995–96) and worked on campaigns for the federal seat of Herbert before he won a by-election for Mundingburra on 3 February 1996. His win deprived the Labor government of its majority and led to the installation of Rob Borbidge of the National Party as Premier. Tanti sat in parliament until the 1998 state election, when he was defeated by the Labor candidate Lindy Nelson-Carr.

Parliament of Queensland
Preceded by Ken Davies (politician)	Member for Mundingburra; 1996–1998	Succeeded by Lindy Nelson-Carr
