= Peter Beattie =

Australian politician (born 1952)

The Honourable Peter Beattie AC
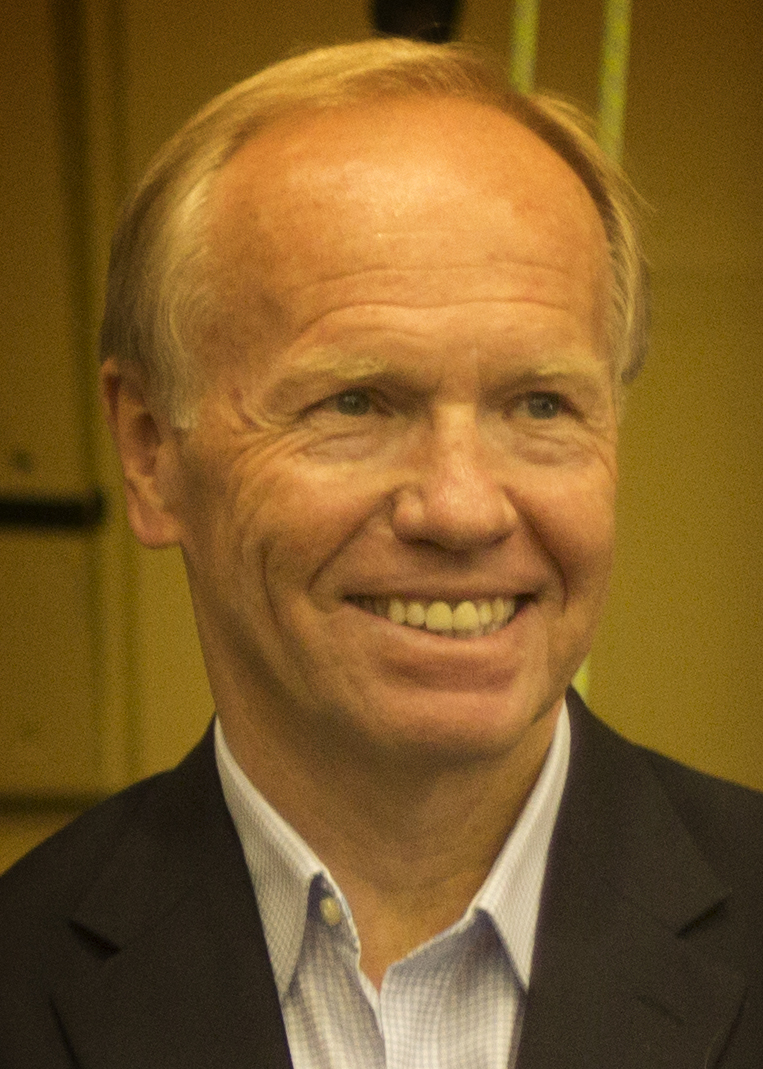
- Beattie in 2013

36th Premier of Queensland
- In office 20 June 1998 – 13 September 2007
- Monarch: Elizabeth II
- Governor: Peter Arnison; Quentin Bryce
- Deputy: Jim Elder; Paul Braddy; Terry Mackenroth; Anna Bligh
- Preceded by: Rob Borbidge
- Succeeded by: Anna Bligh

45th Treasurer of Queensland
- In office 28 July 2005 – 2 February 2006
- Premier: Himself
- Preceded by: Terry Mackenroth
- Succeeded by: Anna Bligh

Leader of the Labor Party in Queensland
- In office 19 February 1996 – 13 September 2007
- Deputy: Jim Elder; Paul Braddy; Terry Mackenroth; Anna Bligh
- Preceded by: Wayne Goss
- Succeeded by: Anna Bligh

Leader of the Opposition of Queensland
- In office 19 February 1996 – 20 June 1998
- Deputy: Jim Elder
- Preceded by: Rob Borbidge
- Succeeded by: Rob Borbidge

Minister for Health of Queensland
- In office 31 July 1995 – 19 February 1996
- Premier: Wayne Goss
- Preceded by: Jim Elder
- Succeeded by: Mike Horan

Member of the Queensland Legislative Assembly for Brisbane Central
- In office 2 December 1989 – 13 September 2007
- Preceded by: Brian Davis
- Succeeded by: Grace Grace

Personal details
- Born: Peter Douglas Beattie; 18 November 1952 (age 74) Sydney, New South Wales, Australia
- Party: Labor
- Spouse: Heather Scott-Halliday (m. 1975)
- Children: 3
- Education: Atherton State High School
- Alma mater: University of Queensland; Queensland University of Technology
- Profession: Lawyer; Unionist; Politician

Peter Douglas Beattie (born 18 November 1952) is an Australian former politician who served as the 36th Premier of Queensland, in office from 1998 to 2007. He was the state leader of the Labor Party from 1996 to 2007.

Beattie was born in Sydney but grew up in Atherton, Queensland. He worked as a lawyer, union secretary and ALP State Secretary before entering politics. Beattie was elected to the Queensland Legislative Assembly at the 1989 state election. He served as a Health Minister from 1995 to 1996 under Wayne Goss, and then replaced Goss as party leader following a change in government. As leader of the opposition, Beattie led the Labor Party back to power at the 1998 election, and won further victories at the 2001, 2004 and 2006 elections. He retired in 2007 and was succeeded by his deputy Anna Bligh.

After retiring as Premier, Beattie was appointed to a series of corporate government and academic boards and held numerous academic roles. He made an unsuccessful attempt to enter federal politics at the 2013 election, standing in the Division of Forde. In 2016, Beattie was made chairman of the organising committee for the 2018 Commonwealth Games on the Gold Coast. He was appointed a Commissioner of the Australian Rugby League Commission in July, 2017 and chair in February 2018 and Deputy Chair of the Rugby League International Federation (RLIF) in November, 2018. Beattie joined the board of the Medical Research Commercialisation Fund in July 2010 and became chair in July 2019.

== Early life and education ==
Peter Douglas Beattie was born on 18 November 1952 in Sydney, the youngest of seven children. Following the death of his mother when he was four years old, he was raised by his grandmother at Atherton, a small town in North Queensland. He attended Atherton State High School where he was both Dux and School Captain.

He moved to Brisbane to attend the University of Queensland after winning a Commonwealth Scholarship, graduating with a Bachelor of Arts degree and a Bachelor of Laws degree. He was President of the Student Club at St John's College.

He completed a Master of Arts degree from Queensland University of Technology, and then began practising as a lawyer.

== Early career ==
Prior to his election to parliament, Beattie was a solicitor of the Supreme Court of Queensland and secretary of the Railway Station Officers' Union.

== Political career ==
=== Pre-parliamentary career ===
In 1974, he joined the Australian Labor Party, which had been in opposition for 17 years and had just suffered the worst defeat in its history at the hands of the dominant National Party Premier, Joh Bjelke-Petersen.

In the 1980 federal election, Beattie was the Labor candidate for the federal Division of Ryan and was defeated by the Liberal incumbent John Moore, but achieving a 3 per cent two-party preferred swing in the process. He only nominated for Ryan to give him the right to appeal to the National Executive of the ALP from a six-month suspension from the Queensland ALP for criticising the state parliamentary party for incompetence.

Beattie started a Reform Group within the ALP led by Dr Denis Murphy and himself to reform the Queensland branch of the party, which was dominated by elderly and conservative trade union leaders. In 1981 the federal Labor Party leader, Bill Hayden (himself a Queenslander), led a federal intervention in Queensland, and Beattie became Queensland State Secretary. Eight years later these reforms paved the way for the election of Wayne Goss when he became Queensland's first Labor Premier since Vince Gair in 1957.

=== Early parliamentary career (1989-1996) ===
At the 1989 election Beattie was elected to the Queensland Parliament as MP for Brisbane Central. Something of a maverick within the parliamentary party during his early term, Beattie was opposed by old guard faction leaders and kept out of the ministry for his role as Parliamentary Chair of the Criminal Justice Committee. His main post was as chairman of the parliamentary committee overseeing the Criminal Justice Commission (now the Crime and Corruption Commission), a role in which he frequently took an independent stand against improper behaviour by supporting the CJC Commissioner Sir Max Bingham against the Goss government, earning Goss's ire. Beattie also publicly criticised Goss for being out of touch. As a result, Goss did not appoint him to the ministry until Labor's near defeat at the 1995 election, where Beattie became Minister for Health. He was only in office for six months before the Goss government lost office following defeat in the Mundingburra by-election.

Goss then stood down as ALP leader, and Beattie was elected in his stead unopposed, thus becoming Opposition Leader. His first act as Opposition leader was a tactical one, moving a motion in Parliament preventing the new Coalition government under Rob Borbidge from calling an early election. Labor was unpopular at the time and feared that an early election could give the Coalition an outright majority. The motion carried.

=== Premier (1998-2007) ===
At the 1998 state election, Labor won 44 seats out of 89, and was only denied a majority when One Nation won six seats that otherwise would have gone to Labor if not for leakage of Coalition preferences. The balance of power rested with two independents, Peter Wellington and Liz Cunningham, and the 11 One Nation MPs. Labor needed the support of only one crossbencher to make Beattie premier, while the Coalition needed them all for Borbidge to stay in office. After negotiations with Beattie, Wellington announced his support for Labor, allowing Beattie to form a minority government. Beattie said the ALP would govern as if it had a majority of ten.

A few months later, Charles Rappolt, the One Nation member for Mulgrave, abruptly resigned. Labor's Warren Pitt, who had held the seat from 1989 to 1995, won the ensuing by-election, giving Beattie a majority in his own right.

In 1999, Beattie signed an agreement with Noel Pearson and other leaders to bring into being the Cape York Partnership, a social and economic development program for Indigenous Australians of the Cape York Peninsula that emphasises personal responsibility.

Shortly before the 2001 election, he faced a crisis when a CJC inquiry - the Shepherdson inquiry - revealed that a number of MPs and party activists, including Deputy Premier Jim Elder, had been engaged in breaches of the Electoral Act by falsely enrolling people to boost their faction's strength in internal party ballots. Former ALP state secretary and newly elected MP Mike Kaiser, as well as a senior adviser to Wayne Goss had been falsely enrolled some years earlier as part of a factional battle. Beattie acted swiftly, forcing Elder and several other MPs to quit politics and to leave the ALP. In the ensuing campaign, Beattie claimed a Labor win would ensure stable government. He argued the only alternative was a Coalition government propped up by One Nation and former One Nation MPs—an argument that gained particular resonance when Borbidge's own party room reneged on Borbidge's promise not to preference One Nation. Beattie was rewarded with a smashing victory, winning 66 seats out of 89—the biggest majority Labor has ever won in an election. It also took all but one seat in Brisbane. The Liberal Party ended up with only three seats in parliament.

Beattie's key agenda was to transform Queensland into Australia's "Smart State" by restructuring the economy and reforming the education system, skilling the workforce and encouraging innovation, research and development and high tech biotechnology, information technology and aviation industries to locate in Queensland including Virgin airlines. In 2003, the Premier was awarded an honorary doctorate of science from the University of Queensland "in recognition of his leadership and commitment to higher education through Smart State initiatives and his support for research in the fields of biotechnology and nanotechnology".

==== 2004 state election ====
Beattie's government drove an innovation agenda in new industries which reduced Queensland's unemployment level below its target of 5%. In February 2004 Beattie again went to the polls but a crisis blew up shortly before the election, with a highly critical report on the state of Queensland's system of child protection. Beattie accepted full personal responsibility for the issue, and paradoxically turned the issue into a positive for the government. At the 7 February elections Beattie won 63 seats, a net loss of only three, losing four seats to the National-Liberal Opposition but gaining one from them. This made him one of the most successful state politicians in Australian history.

==== 2005 and 2006 Queensland Health crisis ====
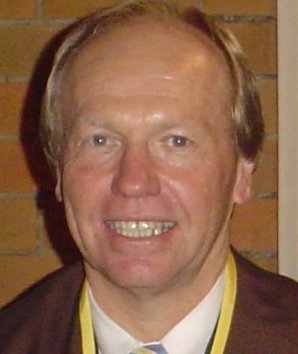
Beattie in 2006

Having delivered on his Smart State Strategy, the Beattie government was riding high in public support. However, in the latter part of 2005, Beattie faced potentially his most serious political crisis: the revelations and inquiries into Queensland Health and the Bundaberg public hospital after Jayant Patel, an Indian-born surgeon who performed several botched operations, some of which resulted in death, fled the country to the United States, where he had previously been struck off the register. As was his style, Beattie faced the crisis head on. Amid the controversy and evidence at an Inquiry established by the Beattie government, the health minister Gordon Nuttall resigned his portfolio, the Speaker, Ray Hollis, resigned after controversy associated with his use of Parliamentary expenditure, and the Deputy Premier and Treasurer, Terry Mackenroth, retired, forcing by-elections in the safe Labor seats of Redcliffe and Chatsworth on 20 August. Labor suffered major swings against it and both seats were lost to the Liberal Party, the first serious electoral setback for Beattie since becoming Premier.

Following the retirement of the Premier of New South Wales, Bob Carr in 2005, Beattie became the longest-serving state Premier among his contemporaries.

==== 2006 state election ====
Beattie went on to win the September 2006 election convincingly in a third landslide, with a slight swing towards the ALP in terms of its primary vote, and two party preferred result. The Government even won back the two seats of Redcliffe and Chatsworth it had lost in the recent by elections. Coalition Opposition Leader Lawrence Springborg stepped down. Before the election Liberal Leader Bob Quinn was forced by his party colleagues to step down a fortnight before polling day. The campaign of Quinn's replacement Dr Bruce Flegg was characterized by inexperience and indecisiveness and lacked an organised, professional approach. Premier Beattie therefore was never challenged by the opposition and was able to secure a fourth consecutive term in office with another landslide victory. This result puts Beattie in the realm of iconic political figures. He is the only state Labor leader since Neville Wran, NSW Labor Premier from 1976 to 1986, to do so and is Queensland's fourth longest serving Premier after Labor's William Forgan Smith (1932–1942), the Country Party's Frank Nicklin (1957–1968) and National Party Premier Sir Joh Bjelke-Petersen (1968–1987). His Greens opponent at this election in Brisbane Central was future federal Greens leader Larissa Waters.

=== Retirement from state politics ===
Beattie announced on 10 September 2007 his decision to retire from politics. His resignation as Premier officially took effect on 13 September 2007. At the time of his retirement, he was the longest-serving state premier in the country. Beattie had groomed his deputy Anna Bligh to be his successor for some time and the Labor caucus elected Anna Bligh as its leader on 12 September. In 2009, Anna Bligh led her party to a state election victory, thereby becoming the first Australian female to be popularly elected as state premier in Queensland.

He officially stood down as the Member for Brisbane Central on 14 September 2007. Beattie then served as Queensland's Trade Commissioner to North and South America based in Los Angeles, a position he was appointed to by Anna Bligh in March 2008.

=== Federal politics ===
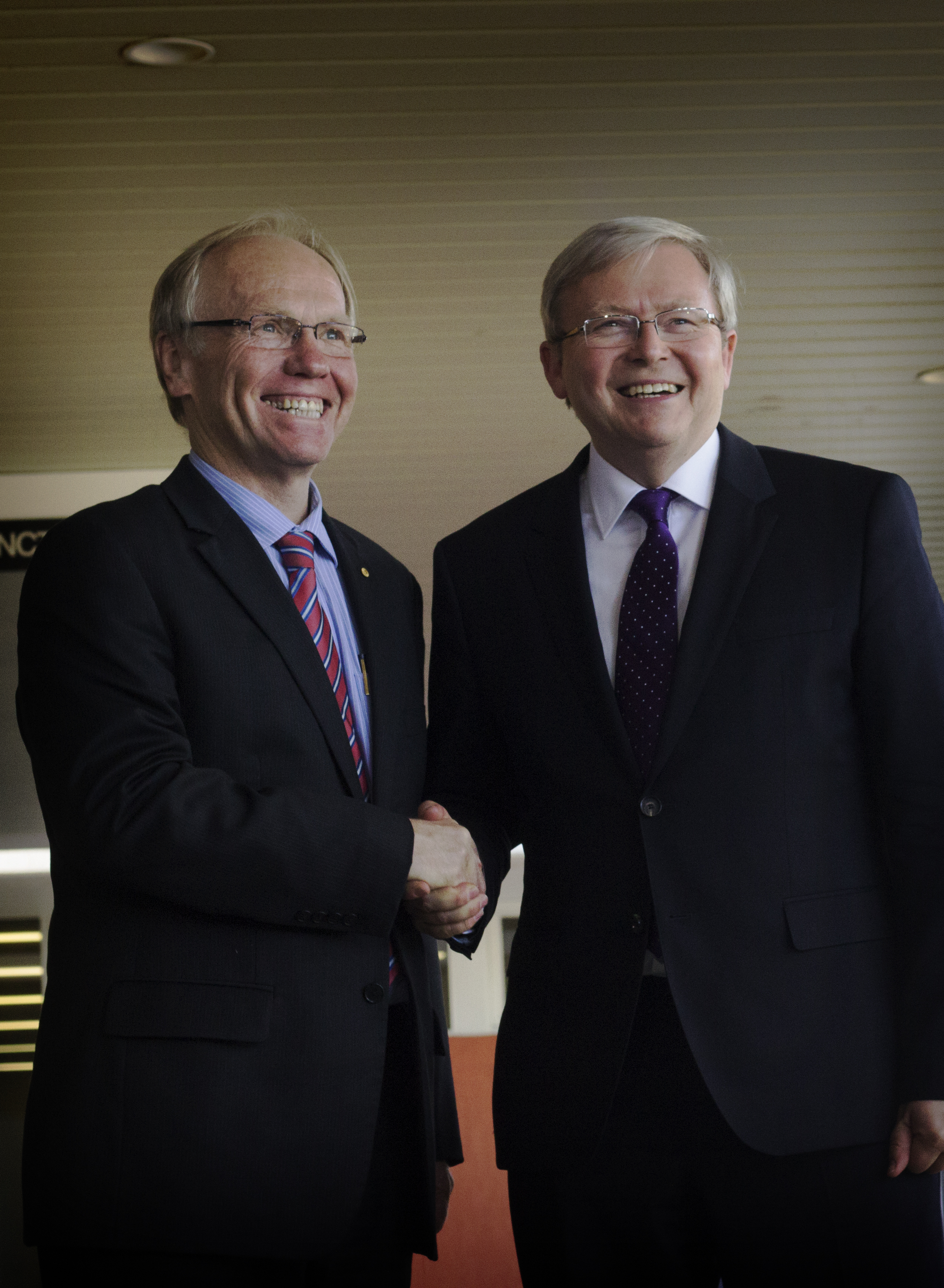
Beattie with Kevin Rudd, the then-Prime Minister of Australia, during his unsuccessful campaign for the Division of Forde at the 2013 federal election

Beattie's popularity often led to speculation that he would enter national politics, particularly after federal Labor's defeat at the 2001 federal election. But Beattie resisted such suggestions, saying that he loved Queensland too much to leave, and anyway Canberra was "too cold". On announcing his retirement he again ruled out a move to federal politics, saying that he would, politically speaking, disappear.

However, in August 2013, Beattie announced his intention to run in the 2013 federal election in the Queensland federal seat of Forde following an approach by Prime Minister Rudd to Beattie who was then living in New York. The ALP was in electoral trouble and Beattie was convinced to run to save Queensland seats. Following the ALP's disastrous national campaign, Beattie was defeated by incumbent Liberal National Party MP Bert van Manen.

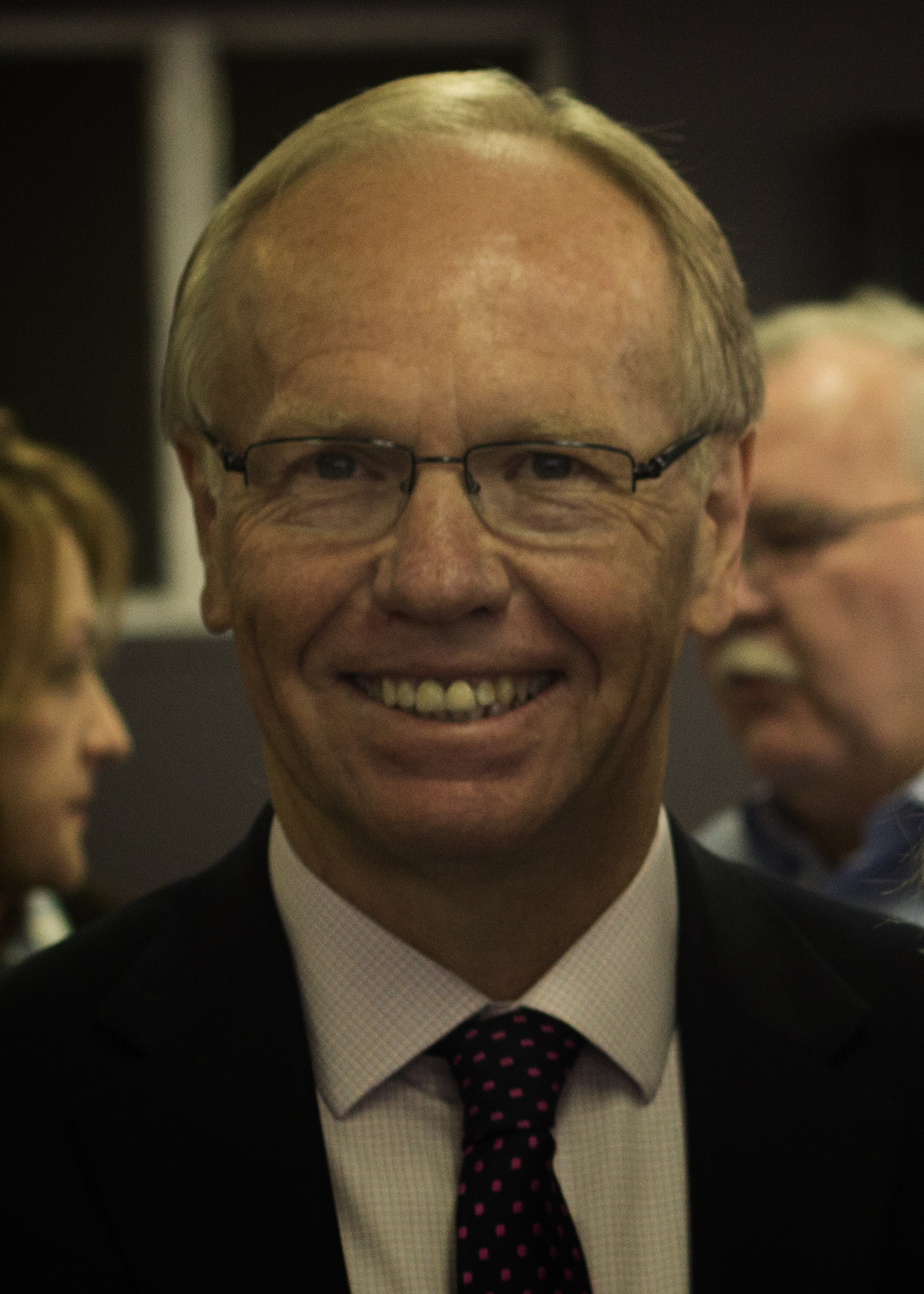
Beattie in August 2013

== Other roles and activities ==
In late May 2010 Beattie announced that he was retiring from his position as Queensland's Los Angeles-based trade and investment commissioner. to take up an appointment in the US. In June 2010 it was announced that he had accepted a position with Clemson University in South Carolina.

On 24 August 2011, the Gillard government appointed Beattie as Australia's first Resources Sector Supplier Envoy, charged with promoting a "Buy Australian at Home and Abroad" program for supplying products to the Australian resources industry.

=== Autobiography ===
In May 2005 Beattie released his autobiography Making A Difference, in which he described his upbringing, political life and his views on key issues, including health, education and social reform. The book is part memoir, part manifesto. Beattie says that the reason he released the book while he is in office, rather than when he is retired, is because no-one would want to read about him if he was not in the public arena. It was Beattie's third book after his autobiographical piece In the Arena (1990) and the thriller The Year of the Dangerous Ones. Beattie wrote a fourth book "Where to from here Australia?" published in 2016.

=== Personal collection ===
Peter Beattie donated his personal collection of records to the State Library of Queensland's John Oxley Library. The papers cover the years between 1955 and 2010 and include photographs, correspondence, diaries, political ephemera, speeches, clippings and other material relating to his time as a solicitor and politician. In 2019 the State Library produced a digital story with Peter Beattie. The interview by Peter Shooter covers the events leading up to the reform of the Queensland Labor Party, and focuses on those events which have contributed most significantly to Queensland's historical record and on Peter Beattie's achievements in government.

=== Media commentary ===
Beattie's description by Liberal Leader Dr David Watson as a "media tart" as well as his political successes led to a love-hate relationship with The Courier-Mail, Brisbane's daily newspaper. Columnist Peter Wear, for example, ran a long-running satire on Queensland politics in general with the major role played by "President for Life Mbeattie".

The controversy over the performance of the government-owned electricity supplier Energex during the severe 2003–2004 storm season in South East Queensland resulted in the characterisation of Beattie as "Power Point Pete" by Courier-Mail cartoonist Sean Leahy, with the location of the drawing's eyes and nose designed to replicate the holes of a power point.

Beattie joined Sky News Live as a commentator across multiple programs in February 2015. Beattie began co-hosting his own TV program with Peter Reith in April 2016, which continued with former Queensland Premier Campbell Newman in 2017 until May 2018, when Beattie retired from Sky News to focus on his position of Chair of the ARLC. Beattie was a regular political election commentator on Channels 9 and 7 from 2007 to 2015 and a regular Columnists for The Australian Newspaper from 2010 to 2015.

== Sporting interests ==
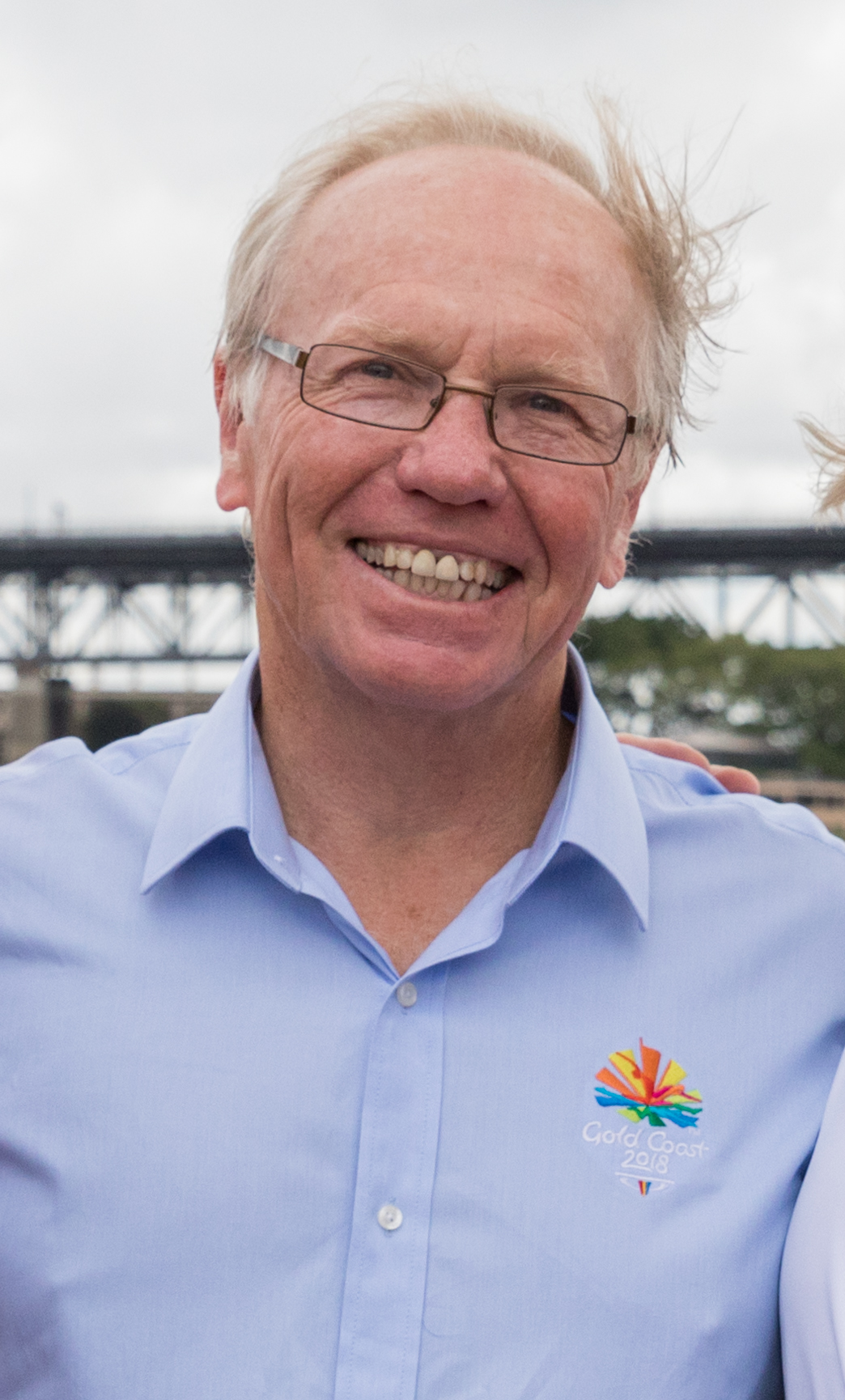
Beattie at the Queen's Baton Relay for the 2018 Commonwealth Games on the Gold Coast

In May 2016, Premier Annastacia Palaszczuk appointed Beattie chairman of the challenged Gold Coast Commonwealth Games Corporation, the organising committee for the 2018 Commonwealth Games. It was criticised by the Queensland Opposition as a political appointment but well received by the Commonwealth Games Federation. The Games were highly successful and regarded as the best games ever, however, organisers received criticism after broadcasters failed to show footage of the athletes entering the stadium for the closing ceremony, broadcasting "My Kitchen Rules" instead. To avoid any blame games Beattie accepted responsibility, publicly apologised and described it as "clearly a stuff-up".

Beattie was appointed to the board of the Australian Rugby League Commission (ARLC) on 25 July 2017, as an independent commissioner. In February 2018, he was appointed chairman of the commission in place of John Grant. He is a supporter of reforming the organisation's constitution to give National Rugby League (NRL) teams and state organisations direct representation on the board. As Chair of the ARLC, Beattie brought in major reforms including a new "No Fault" stand down rule for players charged with serious offences and ended the battles between the ARLC and the Clubs. He is also a strong supporter of the Magic Round pioneered in Brisbane in May, 2019 and expanding Women's rugby league and rugby league in PNG, Fiji and the Pacific Nations.

== Honours ==
On 1 January 2001, Beattie was awarded the Centenary Medal for his contribution to Queensland.

On 11 June 2012, Beattie was named a Companion of the Order of Australia for "eminent service to the Parliament and community of Queensland, through initiatives in the area of education and training, economic development, particularly in biotechnology, information technology and aviation industries, and to the promotion of international trade".

Beattie has been awarded honorary doctorates from Griffith University and Bond University.

He won the first Biotechnology Industry Organisation's inaugural "International Award for Leadership Excellence" in 2008.

== Personal life ==
Beattie married Scott-Halliday in 1975, who was a professor of nursing. She was briefly involved in Brisbane City Council politics in her own capacity in 2012. Beattie has three children.

Political offices
Preceded by Rob Borbidge	Premier of Queensland; 1998–2007	Succeeded by Anna Bligh
Preceded by Terry Mackenroth	Treasurer of Queensland; 2005–2006	Succeeded by Anna Bligh
Preceded by Jim Elder	Minister for Trade; 2000–2005	Succeeded by Anna Bligh
Preceded by Anna Bligh	Minister for Trade; 2006–2007	Succeeded by John Mickel
Preceded by Jim Elder	Minister for State Development; 2000	Succeeded by Terry Mackenroth
Preceded by Rob Borbidge	Leader of the Opposition in Queensland; 1996–1998	Succeeded by Rob Borbidge
Party political offices
Preceded by Wayne Goss	Leader of the Labor Party in Queensland; 1996–2007	Succeeded by Anna Bligh
Parliament of Queensland
Preceded by Brian Davis	Member for Brisbane Central; 1989–2007	Succeeded by Grace Grace
