= Ken Davies (politician) =

Australian politician

The Honourable Ken Davies

Member of the Queensland Legislative Assembly for Townsville
- In office 2 December 1989 – 19 September 1992
- Preceded by: Tony Burreket
- Succeeded by: Geoff Smith

Member of the Queensland Legislative Assembly for Mundingburra
- In office 19 September 1992 – 8 December 1995
- Preceded by: New seat
- Succeeded by: Frank Tanti

Personal details
- Born: Kenneth Henry Davies; 8 July 1948 (age 78) Longreach, Queensland, Australia
- Party: Labor
- Other political affiliations: Independent
- Occupation: Accountant

Kenneth Henry Davies (born 8 July 1948) is an Australian politician who represented the seats of Townsville and Mundingburra in the Queensland Legislative Assembly for the Labor Party. First elected in 1989, he was the head of the Parliamentary Criminal Justice Commission, and then was promoted to cabinet, in a junior ministerial role in Emergency Services and Consumer Affairs. A close race in the 1995 state election resulted in him winning by just 16 votes. The result was overturned by the Court of Disputed Returns on 8 December 1995, and Davies, running as an independent after being disendorsed by the ALP, lost in the subsequent by-election.

From 1998 to 2005 he served as general manager of the Kyogle Council in northern New South Wales, but was dismissed from the role after being criticised for living in Brisbane and commuting to Kyogle.

Parliament of Queensland
Preceded by Tony Burreket	Member for Townsville; 1989–1992	Succeeded by Geoff Smith
New seat	Member for Mundingburra; 1989–1992	Succeeded by Frank Tanti
