= Electoral results for the district of Gympie =

Queensland, Australia, district election results

This is a list of electoral results for the electoral district of Gympie in Queensland state elections.

== Members for Gympie ==
Single member electorate (1873–1888)
Member	Party	Term
Robert Lord	Unaligned	1873–1877
James Kidgell	Unaligned	1877–1878
John Hamilton	McIlwraith conservative	1878–1883
William Smyth	Unaligned	1883–1888

Dual member electorate (1888–1912)
Member	Party	Term	Member	Party	Term
William Smyth	Unaligned	1888–1899	Matthew Mellor	Unaligned	1888–1893
William Smyth	Unaligned	1888–1899	Andrew Fisher	Labor	1893–1896
William Smyth	Unaligned	1888–1899	Jacob Stumm	Ministerialist	1896–1899
George Ryland	Labor	1899–1912	Andrew Fisher	Labor	1899–1901
George Ryland	Labor	1899–1912	Daniel Mulcahy	Labor	1901–1912

Single member electorate (1912–1950)
Member	Party	Term
George Mackay	Ministerialist	1912–1915
Thomas Dunstan	Labor	1915–1929
Vivian Tozer	Country and Progressive National	1929–1935
Thomas Dunstan	Labor	1935–1950

Single member electorate (1960–present)
Member	Party	Term
Max Hodges	Country	1960–1974
Max Hodges	National	1974–1979
Len Stephan	National	1979–2001
Elisa Roberts	One Nation	2001–2002
Elisa Roberts	Independent	2002–2006
David Gibson	National	2006–2008
David Gibson	Liberal National	2008–2015
Tony Perrett	Liberal National	2015–present

== Election results ==
=== Elections in the 2020s ===
2024 Queensland state election: Gympie
Party	Candidate	Votes	%	±%
Liberal National	Tony Perrett	17,530	46.43	+4.01
Labor	Lachlan Anderson	8,849	23.44	−5.20
One Nation	Katy McCallum	8,347	22.11	+9.53
Greens	Emma Buhse	3,029	8.02	+1.81
Total formal votes		37,755	95.79	+0.60
Informal votes		1,661	4.21	−0.60
Turnout		39,416	89.06	+0.03
Two-party-preferred result
Liberal National	Tony Perrett	24,448	64.75	+6.26
Labor	Lachlan Anderson	13,307	35.25	−6.26
Liberal National hold		Swing	+6.26	

2020 Queensland state election: Gympie
Party	Candidate	Votes	%	±%
Liberal National	Tony Perrett	14,071	42.42	+5.18
Labor	Geoff Williams	9,501	28.64	+6.26
One Nation	Michael Blaxland	4,172	12.58	−17.15
Greens	Lauren Granger-Brown	2,060	6.21	+0.52
Independent	Tim Jerome	1,709	5.15	+5.15
Independent	Donna Reardon	636	1.92	−3.04
Informed Medical Options	Nicholas Fairbairn	566	1.71	+1.71
Independent	Roland Maertens	457	1.38	+1.38
Total formal votes		33,172	95.19	−0.61
Informal votes		1,676	4.81	+0.61
Turnout		34,848	89.03	−0.69
Two-party-preferred result
Liberal National	Tony Perrett	19,402	58.49	−0.20
Labor	Geoff Williams	13,770	41.51	+0.20
Liberal National hold		Swing	−0.20	

=== Elections in the 2010s ===
2017 Queensland state election: Gympie
Party	Candidate	Votes	%	±%
Liberal National	Tony Perrett	11,829	37.2	−4.5
One Nation	Chelle Dobson	9,444	29.7	+29.0
Labor	Tracey McWilliam	7,109	22.4	−0.4
Greens	Roxanne Kennedy-Perriman	1,809	5.7	−0.1
Independent	Donna Reardon	1,574	5.0	+5.0
Total formal votes		31,765	95.8	−2.1
Informal votes		1,392	4.2	+2.1
Turnout		33,157	89.7	+2.5
Two-candidate-preferred result
Liberal National	Tony Perrett	18,640	58.7	+0.5
One Nation	Chelle Dobson	13,125	41.3	+41.3
Liberal National hold		Swing	+0.5	

2015 Queensland state election: Gympie
Party	Candidate	Votes	%	±%
Liberal National	Tony Perrett	12,366	41.30	−11.72
Labor	Stephen Meredith	6,971	23.28	+11.04
Katter's Australian	Shane Paulger	4,804	16.05	−5.79
Palmer United	Mitchell Frost	3,384	11.30	+11.30
Greens	Shena Macdonald	2,414	8.06	−0.43
Total formal votes		29,939	97.80	−0.04
Informal votes		673	2.20	+0.04
Turnout		30,612	91.52	−1.01
Two-party-preferred result
Liberal National	Tony Perrett	13,833	57.10	−10.16
Labor	Stephen Meredith	10,394	42.90	+10.16
Liberal National hold		Swing	−10.16	

2012 Queensland state election: Gympie
Party	Candidate	Votes	%	±%
Liberal National	David Gibson	15,054	53.03	−7.60
Katter's Australian	Shane Paulger	6,198	21.83	+21.83
Labor	Ben Parker	3,475	12.24	−2.41
Greens	Shena MacDonald	2,410	8.49	−1.90
Family First	Kathy Hawke	917	3.23	+3.23
One Nation	Santo Ferraro	335	1.18	+1.18
Total formal votes		28,389	97.84	−0.02
Informal votes		627	2.16	+0.02
Turnout		29,016	92.53	+0.47
Two-candidate-preferred result
Liberal National	David Gibson	16,194	67.26	−9.95
Katter's Australian	Shane Paulger	7,883	32.74	+32.74
Liberal National hold		Swing	−9.95	

=== Elections in the 2000s ===
2009 Queensland state election: Gympie
Party	Candidate	Votes	%	±%
Liberal National	David Gibson	16,612	60.6	+14.7
Labor	Daniel Tabone	4,013	14.6	+2.9
Independent	Elisa Roberts	3,928	14.3	+5.3
Greens	Kent Hutton	2,847	10.4	+1.8
Total formal votes		27,400	97.6	
Informal votes		599	2.4	
Turnout		27,999	92.1	
Two-party-preferred result
Liberal National	David Gibson	18,057	77.2	+5.2
Labor	Daniel Tabone	5,331	22.8	−5.2
Liberal National hold		Swing	+5.2	

2006 Queensland state election: Gympie
Party	Candidate	Votes	%	±%
National	David Gibson	13,054	46.0	+21.1
Independent	Rae Gate	3,857	13.6	+13.6
Labor	Jon Persley	3,508	12.4	−13.3
Greens	Paul Marshall	2,598	9.2	+5.3
Independent	Elisa Roberts	2,393	8.4	−25.0
Family First	Beryl Spencer	2,317	8.2	+8.2
One Nation	Greg Houghton	647	2.3	−3.3
Total formal votes		28,374	98.1	−0.4
Informal votes		543	1.9	+0.4
Turnout		28,917	92.3	−0.5
Two-candidate-preferred result
National	David Gibson	15,469	68.2	+68.2
Independent	Rae Gate	7,199	31.8	+31.8
National gain from Independent		Swing	N/A	

2004 Queensland state election: Gympie
Party	Candidate	Votes	%	±%
Independent	Elisa Roberts	9,031	33.4	+33.4
Labor	Rae Gate	6,946	25.7	−7.7
National	Christian Rowan	6,718	24.9	+0.2
Independent	Wayne Sachs	1,675	6.2	+6.2
One Nation	Colin Bailey	1,508	5.6	−20.1
Greens	Glenda Stasse	1,049	3.9	+3.9
Independent	Martin Poole	77	0.3	+0.3
Total formal votes		27,004	98.5	+0.0
Informal votes		414	1.5	−0.0
Turnout		27,418	92.8	−0.9
Two-candidate-preferred result
Independent	Elisa Roberts	12,285	60.1	+60.1
Labor	Rae Gate	8,172	39.9	−6.8
Independent gain from One Nation		Swing	N/A	

2001 Queensland state election: Gympie
Party	Candidate	Votes	%	±%
Labor	Rae Gate	8,563	33.4	+7.4
One Nation	Elisa Roberts	6,587	25.7	−11.7
National	Stephen Duff	6,330	24.7	−3.7
City Country Alliance	Ian Petersen	4,139	16.2	+16.2
Total formal votes		25,619	98.5	
Informal votes		399	1.5	
Turnout		26,018	93.7	
Two-candidate-preferred result
One Nation	Elisa Roberts	11,130	53.3	+6.8
Labor	Rae Gate	9,766	46.7	+46.7
One Nation gain from National		Swing	+6.8	

=== Elections in the 1990s ===
1998 Queensland state election: Gympie
Party	Candidate	Votes	%	±%
One Nation	Ian Petersen	8,745	39.2	+39.2
National	Len Stephan	6,971	31.3	−23.3
Labor	David Warren	5,806	26.1	−4.7
Greens	Chris Gwin	764	3.4	+3.4
Total formal votes		22,286	98.7	+0.1
Informal votes		284	1.3	−0.1
Turnout		22,570	93.8	+0.9
Two-candidate-preferred result
National	Len Stephan	10,486	51.7	−10.9
One Nation	Ian Petersen	9,796	48.3	+48.3
National hold		Swing	−10.9	

1995 Queensland state election: Gympie
Party	Candidate	Votes	%	±%
National	Len Stephan	11,247	54.6	+14.6
Labor	David Warren	6,339	30.8	−4.7
Independent	Inge Schilling	1,608	7.8	+7.8
Democrats	Peter Sykes	1,397	6.8	+6.8
Total formal votes		20,591	98.7	+0.2
Informal votes		278	1.3	−0.2
Turnout		20,869	92.9	
Two-party-preferred result
National	Len Stephan	12,467	62.6	+5.0
Labor	David Warren	7,450	37.4	−5.0
National hold		Swing	+5.0	

1992 Queensland state election: Gympie
Party	Candidate	Votes	%	±%
National	Len Stephan	7,921	40.0	+6.9
Labor	Geoffrey Brown	7,026	35.5	−1.6
Independent	Bruce Chapman	2,589	13.1	+6.5
Liberal	John Cotter	2,256	11.4	+2.3
Total formal votes		19,792	98.4	
Informal votes		315	1.6	
Turnout		20,107	92.9	
Two-party-preferred result
National	Len Stephan	10,873	57.6	+1.8
Labor	Geoffrey Brown	7,993	42.4	−1.8
National hold		Swing	+1.8	

=== Elections in the 1980s ===
1989 Queensland state election: Gympie
Party	Candidate	Votes	%	±%
Labor	Geoffrey Brown	5,376	35.6	+3.3
National	Len Stephan	5,076	33.6	−23.8
Independent	Adrian McClintock	2,173	14.4	+14.4
Independent	Bruce Chapman	1,179	7.8	+7.8
Liberal	Bruce Kean	1,144	7.6	−2.8
United People	Lewis Blayse	147	1.0	+1.0
Total formal votes		15,095	97.0	−1.5
Informal votes		463	3.0	−1.5
Turnout		15,558	92.2	−0.8
Two-party-preferred result
National	Len Stephan	8,603	57.0	−7.8
Labor	Geoffrey Brown	6,492	43.0	+7.8
National hold		Swing	−7.8	

1986 Queensland state election: Gympie
Party	Candidate	Votes	%	±%
National	Len Stephan	7,830	57.4	−7.1
Labor	Sven Condon	4,404	32.3	−3.2
Liberal	Bruce Kean	1,415	10.4	+10.4
Total formal votes		13,649	98.5	−0.4
Informal votes		211	1.5	+0.4
Turnout		13,860	93.0	−0.5
Two-party-preferred result
National	Len Stephan	8,845	64.8	+0.3
Labor	Sven Condon	4,804	35.2	−0.3
National hold		Swing	+0.3	

1983 Queensland state election: Gympie
Party	Candidate	Votes	%	±%
National	Len Stephan	8,964	64.5	+10.8
Labor	Thomas Barnett	4,940	35.5	+9.6
Total formal votes		13,904	98.9	−0.2
Informal votes		159	1.1	+0.2
Turnout		14,063	93.5	−1.3
National hold		Swing	−3.8	

1980 Queensland state election: Gympie
Party	Candidate	Votes	%	±%
National	Len Stephan	6,679	53.7	−7.8
Labor	Reginald Lawler	3,216	25.9	−2.1
Liberal	Minas Venardos	2,131	17.1	+17.1
Progress	William Runge	412	3.3	−7.2
Total formal votes		12,438	99.1	0.0
Informal votes		106	0.9	0.0
Turnout		12,544	94.8	+1.0
Two-party-preferred result
National	Len Stephan	8,492	68.3	−0.5
Labor	Reginald Lawler	3,946	31.7	+0.5
National hold		Swing	−0.5	

=== Elections in the 1970s ===
1977 Queensland state election: Gympie
Party	Candidate	Votes	%	±%
National	Max Hodges	7,097	61.5	−12.1
Labor	Reginald Lawler	3,232	28.0	+1.6
Progress	William Runge	1,211	10.5	+10.5
Total formal votes		11,540	99.1	
Informal votes		106	0.9	
Turnout		11,646	93.8	
Two-party-preferred result
National	Max Hodges	7,945	68.8	−4.8
Labor	Reginald Lawler	3,595	31.2	+4.8
National hold		Swing	−4.8	

1974 Queensland state election: Gympie
Party	Candidate	Votes	%	±%
National	Max Hodges	7,942	73.6	+19.9
Labor	N. Box	2,850	26.4	−11.6
Total formal votes		10,792	98.5	−0.6
Informal votes		163	1.5	+0.6
Turnout		10,955	93.6	+0.2
National hold		Swing	+13.9	

1972 Queensland state election: Gympie
Party	Candidate	Votes	%	±%
Country	Max Hodges	5,407	53.7	−4.6
Labor	Alex Pringle	3,830	38.0	+6.9
Queensland Labor	Benedict Kehoe	572	5.7	+0.2
Independent	Cecil Rivers	260	2.6	−1.4
Total formal votes		9,611	98.1	
Informal votes		184	1.9	
Turnout		9,795	94.9	
Two-party-preferred result
Country	Max Hodges	6,012	59.7	+5.2
Labor	Alex Pringle	4,057	40.3	−5.2
Country hold		Swing	+5.2	

=== Elections in the 1960s ===
1969 Queensland state election: Gympie
Party	Candidate	Votes	%	±%
Country	Max Hodges	5,608	58.3	+1.0
Labor	Jack Ison	2,992	31.1	−4.7
Queensland Labor	Denis Tanner	525	5.5	−1.4
Independent	Cecil Rivers	388	4.0	+4.0
Independent	Bernard Thomas	98	1.0	+1.0
Total formal votes		9,611	98.1	−1.0
Informal votes		184	1.9	+1.0
Turnout		9,795	94.9	−1.0
Two-party-preferred result
Country	Max Hodges	6,278	65.3	+2.4
Labor	Jack Ison	3,333	34.7	−2.4
Country hold		Swing	+2.4	

1966 Queensland state election: Gympie
Party	Candidate	Votes	%	±%
Country	Max Hodges	5,489	57.3	+0.2
Labor	Marcus Dower	3,432	35.8	+2.3
Queensland Labor	Denis Tanner	664	6.9	−2.5
Total formal votes		9,585	99.1	0.0
Informal votes		90	0.9	0.0
Turnout		9,675	95.9	−0.1
Two-party-preferred result
Country	Max Hodges	6,029	62.9	−1.8
Labor	Marcus Dower	3,556	37.1	+1.8
Country hold		Swing	−1.8	

1963 Queensland state election: Gympie
Party	Candidate	Votes	%	±%
Country	Max Hodges	5,477	57.1	−1.0
Labor	Blair Jamieson	3,213	33.5	+3.3
Queensland Labor	Denis Tanner	897	9.4	−2.3
Total formal votes		9,587	99.1	−0.1
Informal votes		85	0.9	+0.1
Turnout		9,672	96.0	+0.4
Two-party-preferred result
Country	Max Hodges	6,207	64.7	
Labor	Blair Jamieson	3,380	35.3	
Country hold		Swing	N/A	

1960 Queensland state election: Gympie
Party	Candidate	Votes	%	±%
Country	Max Hodges	5,616	58.1	
Labor	Blair Jamieson	2,920	30.2	
Queensland Labor	Denis Tanner	1,129	11.7	
Total formal votes		9,665	99.2	
Informal votes		75	0.8	
Turnout		9,740	95.6	
Country win		(new seat)		

=== Elections in the 1940s ===
1947 Queensland state election: Gympie
Party	Candidate	Votes	%	±%
Labor	Thomas Dunstan	3,116	41.7	−6.1
People's Party	Ronald Witham	3,054	40.8	−2.9
Frank Barnes Labor	Ray Smith	875	11.7	+11.7
Independent	Eric Grice	437	5.8	+5.8
Total formal votes		7,482	99.6	+0.1
Informal votes		28	0.4	−0.1
Turnout		7,510	92.5	+4.5
Labor hold		Swing	−1.7	

1944 Queensland state election: Gympie
Party	Candidate	Votes	%	±%
Labor	Thomas Dunstan	3,197	47.8	−4.6
People's Party	Niels Damm	2,923	43.7	+13.7
Independent	William Ebrington	572	8.5	+8.5
Total formal votes		6,692	99.5	0.0
Informal votes		33	0.5	0.0
Turnout		6,725	88.0	−5.3
Labor hold		Swing	−11.4	

1941 Queensland state election: Gympie
Party	Candidate	Votes	%	±%
Labor	Thomas Dunstan	3,738	52.4	+9.4
United Australia	Ronald Witham	2,142	30.0	+30.0
Country	William Kidd	1,251	17.5	−4.1
Total formal votes		7,131	99.5	+0.2
Informal votes		39	0.5	−0.2
Turnout		7,170	93.3	−0.4
Labor hold		Swing	N/A	

- Preferences were not distributed.

=== Elections in the 1930s ===
1938 Queensland state election: Gympie
Party	Candidate	Votes	%	±%
Labor	Thomas Dunstan	3,040	43.0	−13.7
Protestant Labour	William Millett	2,264	32.0	+32.0
Country	Vivian Tozer	1,526	21.6	−21.7
Social Credit	Alfred Taylor	246	3.5	+3.5
Total formal votes		7,076	99.3	+0.2
Informal votes		51	0.7	−0.2
Turnout		7,127	93.7	−0.5
Two-candidate-preferred result
Labor	Thomas Dunstan	3,203	55.3	−1.4
Protestant Labour	William Millett	2,590	44.7	+44.7
Labor hold		Swing	N/A	

1935 Queensland state election: Gympie
Party	Candidate	Votes	%	±%
Labor	Thomas Dunstan	4,105	56.7	
CPNP	Vivian Tozer	3,138	43.3	
Total formal votes		7,243	99.1	
Informal votes		68	0.9	
Turnout		7,311	94.2	
Labor gain from CPNP		Swing		

1932 Queensland state election: Gympie
Party	Candidate	Votes	%	±%
CPNP	Vivian Tozer	4,116	51.5	
Labor	Thomas Dunstan	3,869	48.5	
Total formal votes		7,985	99.5	
Informal votes		36	0.5	
Turnout		8,021	94.1	
CPNP hold		Swing		

=== Elections in the 1920s ===
1929 Queensland state election: Gympie
Party	Candidate	Votes	%	±%
CPNP	Vivian Tozer	2,548	54.5	+11.5
Labor	Thomas Dunstan	2,125	45.5	−11.5
Total formal votes		4,673		
Informal votes				
Turnout				
CPNP gain from Labor		Swing	+11.5	

1926 Queensland state election: Gympie
Party	Candidate	Votes	%	±%
Labor	Thomas Dunstan	2,795	57.0	+0.9
CPNP	Henry Cowie	2,108	43.0	−0.9
Total formal votes		4,903	99.1	−0.3
Informal votes		44	0.9	+0.3
Turnout		4,947	93.2	+5.4
Labor hold		Swing	+0.9	

1923 Queensland state election: Gympie
Party	Candidate	Votes	%	±%
Labor	Thomas Dunstan	2,598	56.1	+1.3
Country	Henry Cowie	2,033	43.9	+43.9
Total formal votes		4,631	99.4	+0.6
Informal votes		27	0.6	−0.6
Turnout		4,658	87.8	0.0
Labor hold		Swing	+1.3	

1920 Queensland state election: Gympie
Party	Candidate	Votes	%	±%
Labor	Thomas Dunstan	1,863	54.8	−1.9
National	James MacDonnell	1,539	45.2	+1.9
Total formal votes		3,402	98.8	−0.2
Informal votes		42	1.2	+0.2
Turnout		3,444	87.8	+0.6
Labor hold		Swing	−1.9	

=== Elections in the 1910s ===
1918 Queensland state election: Gympie
Party	Candidate	Votes	%	±%
Labor	Thomas Dunstan	2,076	56.7	+4.0
National	Alexander Glasgow	1,585	43.3	−4.0
Total formal votes		3,661	99.0	+0.5
Informal votes		36	1.0	−0.5
Turnout		3,697	87.2	−5.5
Labor hold		Swing	+4.0	

1915 Queensland state election: Gympie
Party	Candidate	Votes	%	±%
Labor	Thomas Dunstan	1,874	52.7	+10.6
Liberal	George Mackay	1,683	47.3	+1.6
Total formal votes		3,557	98.5	−0.2
Informal votes		53	1.5	+0.2
Turnout		3,610	92.7	+12.6
Labor gain from Liberal		Swing	+5.4	

1912 Queensland state election: Gympie
Party	Candidate	Votes	%	±%
Liberal	George Mackay	1,529	45.7	
Labor	George Ryland	1,409	42.1	
Independent Labor	Daniel Mulcahy	407	12.2	
Total formal votes		3,345	98.7	
Informal votes		44	1.3	
Turnout		3,389	80.1	
Two-party-preferred result
Liberal	George Mackay	1,581	52.7	
Labor	George Ryland	1,417	47.3	
Liberal gain from Labor		Swing		
