= Electoral results for the district of Barambah =

Queensland, Australia, district election results

This is a list of electoral results for the electoral district of Barambah in Queensland state elections.

== Members for Barambah ==
Member	Party	Term
Joh Bjelke-Petersen	Country	1950–1974
Joh Bjelke-Petersen	National	1974–1987
Trevor Perrett	CEC	1988
Trevor Perrett	National	1988–1998
Dorothy Pratt	One Nation	1998–1999
Dorothy Pratt	Independent	1999–2001

== Election results ==
=== Elections in the 1990s ===
The election results for the 1998 election were:

1998 Queensland state election: Barambah
Party	Candidate	Votes	%	±%
One Nation	Dorothy Pratt	9,464	43.54	+43.54
National	Trevor Perrett	6,731	30.96	−36.25
Labor	Michael Crook	3,794	17.45	−6.09
Australia First	Rod Morgan	1,100	5.06	+5.06
Independent	Steve Jeffery	491	2.26	+2.26
Independent	Peter Hayden	158	0.73	+0.73
Total formal votes		21,738	98.73	+0.22
Informal votes		280	1.27	−0.22
Turnout		22,018	94.68	+1.24
Two-candidate-preferred result
One Nation	Dorothy Pratt	11,025	55.85	+55.85
National	Trevor Perrett	8,715	44.15	−30.25
One Nation gain from National		Swing	+55.85	

1995 Queensland state election: Barambah
Party	Candidate	Votes	%	±%
National	Trevor Perrett	14,202	67.21	+12.69
Labor	Scott Zackeresen	4,973	23.54	−1.35
Confederate Action	Neville Reimers	1,955	9.25	+9.25
Total formal votes		21,130	98.51	+0.37
Informal votes		320	1.49	−0.37
Turnout		21,450	93.44	−0.14
Two-party-preferred result
National	Trevor Perrett	15,552	74.40	+5.02
Labor	Scott Zackeresen	5,350	25.60	−5.02
National hold		Swing	+5.02	

1992 Queensland state election: Barambah
Party	Candidate	Votes	%	±%
National	Trevor Perrett	11,210	54.5	+6.7
Labor	Peter Allen	5,118	24.9	−2.4
Independent	Bob Young	2,568	12.5	+12.5
Liberal	Cliff Casswell	1,667	8.1	−5.5
Total formal votes		20,563	98.1	
Informal votes		389	1.9	
Turnout		20,952	93.6	
Two-party-preferred result
National	Trevor Perrett	13,273	69.4	+2.6
Labor	Peter Allen	5,857	30.6	−2.6
National hold		Swing	+2.6	

=== Elections in the 1980s ===
1989 Queensland state election: Barambah
Party	Candidate	Votes	%	±%
National	Trevor Perrett	6,477	50.6	−26.9
Labor	John Lang	2,957	23.1	+0.6
Liberal	Bill Walters	1,733	13.6	+13.6
Citizens Electoral Council	Craig Isherwood	1,625	12.7	+12.7
Total formal votes		12,792	97.9	+0.6
Informal votes		273	2.1	−0.6
Turnout		13,065	92.9	−0.6
Two-party-preferred result
National	Trevor Perrett		71.4	−6.1
Labor	John Lang		28.6	+6.1
National hold		Swing	−6.1	

1988 Barambah state by-election
Party	Candidate	Votes	%	±%
National	Warren Truss	4,754	41.27	−36.20
Citizens Electoral Council	Trevor Perrett	3,639	31.59	+31.59
Labor	John Lang	2,033	17.65	−4.88
New Country Party	Kevin Polzin	1,092	9.48	+9.48
Total formal votes		11,518	98.15	+0.88
Informal votes		216	1.85	−0.88
Turnout		11,734	84.90	−8.63
Two-candidate-preferred result
Citizens Electoral Council	Trevor Perrett	6,232	54.11	+54.11
National	Warren Truss	5,286	45.89	−31.58
Citizens Electoral Council gain from National		Swing	N/A	

1986 Queensland state election: Barambah
Party	Candidate	Votes	%	±%
National	Joh Bjelke-Petersen	9,114	77.5	−1.0
Labor	James Horton	2,651	22.5	+1.0
Total formal votes		11,765	97.3	−0.6
Informal votes		330	2.7	+0.6
Turnout		12,095	93.5	−0.2
National hold		Swing	−1.0	

1983 Queensland state election: Barambah
Party	Candidate	Votes	%	±%
National	Joh Bjelke-Petersen	8,446	78.5	−1.9
Labor	Fred Hoberg	2,310	21.5	+4.7
Total formal votes		10,756	98.9	−0.1
Informal votes		123	1.1	+0.1
Turnout		10,879	93.7	+1.8
National hold		Swing	−3.3	

1980 Queensland state election: Barambah
Party	Candidate	Votes	%	±%
National	Joh Bjelke-Petersen	8,011	80.4	+2.1
Labor	Brian Hawkes	1,670	16.8	−4.9
Independent	Henry Collins	279	2.8	+2.8
Total formal votes		9,960	99.0	+0.5
Informal votes		100	1.0	−0.5
Turnout		10,060	91.9	−1.9
Two-party-preferred result
National	Joh Bjelke-Petersen	8,150	81.8	+3.5
Labor	Brian Hawkes	1,810	18.2	−3.5
National hold		Swing	+3.5	

=== Elections in the 1970s ===
1977 Queensland state election: Barambah
Party	Candidate	Votes	%	±%
National	Joh Bjelke-Petersen	7,707	78.3	−5.1
Labor	John Hunt	2,136	21.7	+5.1
Total formal votes		9,843	98.5	
Informal votes		147	1.5	
Turnout		9,990	93.8	
National hold		Swing	−5.1	

1974 Queensland state election: Barambah
Party	Candidate	Votes	%	±%
National	Joh Bjelke-Petersen	8,335	83.4	+16.0
Labor	Donald Gordon-Brown	1,663	16.6	−7.2
Total formal votes		9,998	99.0	0.0
Informal votes		101	1.0	0.0
Turnout		10,099	93.2	−2.5
National hold		Swing	+9.7	

1972 Queensland state election: Barambah
Party	Candidate	Votes	%	±%
Country	Joh Bjelke-Petersen	6,249	67.4	−10.3
Labor	Neville Reinke	2,210	23.8	+1.5
Queensland Labor	Mary Ryan	541	5.8	+5.8
Independent	Percy Edwards	272	2.9	+2.9
Total formal votes		9,272	99.0	
Informal votes		97	1.0	
Turnout		9,369	95.7	
Two-party-preferred result
Country	Joh Bjelke-Petersen	6,835	73.7	−4.0
Labor	Neville Reinke	2,437	26.3	+4.0
Country hold		Swing	−4.0	

=== Elections in the 1960s ===
1969 Queensland state election: Barambah
Party	Candidate	Votes	%	±%
Country	Joh Bjelke-Petersen	6,965	78.2	+4.0
Labor	Norman Hasemann	1,941	21.8	−4.0
Total formal votes		8,906	98.9	+0.3
Informal votes		96	1.1	−0.3
Turnout		9,002	95.0	−0.9
Country hold		Swing	+4.0	

1966 Queensland state election: Barambah
Party	Candidate	Votes	%	±%
Country	Joh Bjelke-Petersen	6,659	74.2	+11.3
Labor	Norman Hasemann	2,315	25.8	+0.4
Total formal votes		8,884	98.6	−0.4
Informal votes		125	1.4	+0.4
Turnout		9,009	95.9	−0.7
Country hold		Swing	+1.9	

1963 Queensland state election: Barambah
Party	Candidate	Votes	%	±%
Country	Joh Bjelke-Petersen	5,715	62.9	−1.6
Labor	William Weir	2,308	25.4	+4.1
Independent	Percy Edwards	1,063	11.7	+11.7
Total formal votes		9,086	99.0	−0.1
Informal votes		93	1.0	+0.1
Turnout		9,179	96.6	+1.6
Two-party-preferred result
Country	Joh Bjelke-Petersen	6,565	72.3	
Labor	William Weir	2,521	27.7	
Country hold		Swing	N/A	

1960 Queensland state election: Barambah
Party	Candidate	Votes	%	±%
Country	Joh Bjelke-Petersen	5,957	64.5	
Labor	Bill Weir	1,968	21.3	
Queensland Labor	Daniel Curtain	1,310	14.2	
Total formal votes		9,235	99.1	
Informal votes		88	0.9	
Turnout		9,323	95.0	
Country hold		Swing		

=== Elections in the 1950s ===
1957 Queensland state election: Barambah
Party	Candidate	Votes	%	±%
Country	Joh Bjelke-Petersen	6,503	70.4	−29.6
Queensland Labor	Thomas O'Neill	2,736	29.6	+29.6
Total formal votes		9,239	98.1	
Informal votes		107	1.9	
Turnout		9,346	95.9	
Country hold		Swing	−29.6	

1956 Queensland state election: Barambah
Party	Candidate	Votes	%	±%
Country	Joh Bjelke-Petersen	unopposed		
Country hold		Swing		

1953 Queensland state election: Barambah
Party	Candidate	Votes	%	±%
Country	Joh Bjelke-Petersen	unopposed		
Country hold		Swing		

1950 Queensland state election: Barambah
Party	Candidate	Votes	%	±%
Country	Joh Bjelke-Petersen	6,881	75.2	
Labor	Donald Christiansen	2,266	24.8	
Total formal votes		9,147	99.3	
Informal votes		67	0.7	
Turnout		9,214	94.2	
Country hold		Swing		
