= Electoral results for the district of Nash =

Queensland, Australia, district election results

This is a list of electoral results for the electoral district of Nash in Queensland state elections.

== Members for Nash ==
Member	Party	Term
Thomas Dunstan	Labor	1950–1953
Greg Kehoe	Labor	1953–1957
Greg Kehoe	QLP	1957
Max Hodges	Country	1957–1960

== Election results ==
=== Elections in the 1950s ===
1957 Queensland state election: Nash
Party	Candidate	Votes	%	±%
Country	Max Hodges	4,331	41.5	−2.5
Queensland Labor	Greg Kehoe	3,696	35.4	+35.4
Labor	George Hooper	2,414	23.1	−32.9
Total formal votes		10,441	99.3	+0.3
Informal votes		78	0.7	−0.3
Turnout		10,519	96.8	+1.6
Country gain from Labor		Swing	N/A	

1956 Queensland state election: Nash
Party	Candidate	Votes	%	±%
Labor	Greg Kehoe	5,751	56.0	−0.1
Country	Max Hodges	4,516	44.0	+44.0
Total formal votes		10,267	99.0	−0.2
Informal votes		106	1.0	+0.2
Turnout		10,373	95.2	+1.0
Labor hold		Swing	−0.1	

1953 Queensland state election: Nash
Party	Candidate	Votes	%	±%
Labor	Greg Kehoe	5,583	56.1	+6.0
Liberal	Ronald Witham	4,373	43.9	−6.0
Total formal votes		9,956	99.2	−0.2
Informal votes		75	0.8	+0.2
Turnout		10,031	94.2	+0.1
Labor hold		Swing	+6.0	

1950 Queensland state election: Nash
Party	Candidate	Votes	%	±%
Labor	Thomas Dunstan	4,584	50.1	
Liberal	Ronald Witham	4,559	49.9	
Total formal votes		9,143	99.4	
Informal votes		52	0.6	
Turnout		9,195	94.1	
Labor hold		Swing		
