= Fishermans Pocket, Queensland =

Fishermans Pocket
- Suburb
- Interactive map of Fishermans Pocket
- Coordinates: 26.1666°S 152.6°E
- Country: Australia
- State: Queensland
- LGA: Gympie Region
- Location: 8.1 km (5.0 mi) NW of Gympie; 183 km (114 mi) N of Brisbane

Government
  - State electorate: Gympie
  - Federal division: Wide Bay

Area
  - Total: 7.7 km^{2} (3.0 sq mi)

Population
  - Total: 60 (2021 census)
  - Density: 7.8/km^{2} (20.2/sq mi)
- Time zone: UTC+10:00 (AEST)
- Postcode: 4570
Suburbs around Fishermans Pocket
| Bells Bridge; Glastonbury | Chatsworth | Chatsworth |
| The Palms | Fishermans Pocket | Two Mile |
| The Palms | Widgee Crossing North | Widgee Crossing North |

Fishermans Pocket is a rural locality in the Gympie Region, Queensland, Australia. In the 2021 census, Fishermans Pocket had a population of 60 people.

== Geography ==
The Mary River forms most of the south-western boundary.

There is a small section of the Fishermans Pocket State Forest in the north of the locality, extending into neighbouring Chatsworth. Apart from that protected area, the land use is predominantly grazing on native vegetation.

== Demographics ==
In the 2016 census, Fishermans Pocket had a population of 28 people.

In the 2021 census, Fishermans Pocket had a population of 60 people.

== Education ==
There are no schools in Fishermans Pocket. The nearest government primary schools are Chatsworth State School in neighbouring Chatsworth to the north and Two Mile State School in neighbouring Two Mile to the east. The nearest government secondary school is James Nash State High School in Gympie.
