= George Ryland =

George Ryland may refer to:

- George Washington Ryland (1827–1910), Wisconsin politician
- George Ryland (Queensland politician) (1855–1920), member of the Queensland Legislative Assembly
