= Daniel Mulcahy (Queensland politician) =

Australian politician (1857–1932)

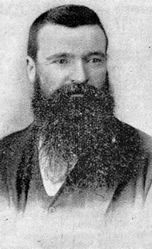

Member of the Queensland Legislative Assembly for Gympie
- In office 11 Mar 1899 – 27 Apr 1912 Serving with George Ryland
- Preceded by: Andrew Fisher
- Succeeded by: George Mackay

Personal details
- Born: Daniel Mulcahy; 1857 Tamworth, Colony of New South Wales
- Died: 6 January 1932 (aged 74-75) Gympie, Queensland, Australia
- Resting place: Gympie Cemetery
- Party: Labour Party
- Spouse(s): Bridget Mary Ryan (m.1885), Mary Frances Synan (m.1892)
- Occupation: Land agent

Daniel Mulcahy (1857 – 6 January 1932) was a member of the Queensland Legislative Assembly.

== Biography ==
Mulcahy was born at Tamworth, New South Wales, the son of John Mulcahy and his wife Ellen (née Allen). He was educated in Tamworth and he became a miner and investor in Gympie from 1880. After his defeat in politics, Mulcahy worked as a land agent in Gympie.

On 8 September 1885, he married Bridget Mary Ryan. She died the following year. He then married Mary Frances Synan, a school teacher, in 1892. They had three daughters and one son together.

Mulcahy died in January 1932 and was buried in the Gympie Cemetery.

== Public career ==
Mulcahy started in politics as an alderman in the Borough of Gympie Council from 1892 until 1900 and was Mayor of the town from 1899 to 1901.

When Andrew Fisher resigned as the state member for Gympie in 1901 to enter federal politics, Mulcahy won the ensuing by-election, beating his opponent, Captain Reid, by just four votes. He went on to represent the electorate until 1912 when he was defeated by George Mackay, a Queensland Liberal.

Parliament of Queensland
Preceded by Andrew Fisher	Member for Gympie; 1901–1912; Served alongside: George Ryland	Succeeded by George Mackay
