= 30 Lady Mary Terrace, Gympie =

Former historic building in Gympie, Australia

Coordinates: 26.188136012678566°S 152.67025801606903°E

30 Lady Mary Terrace, Gympie was originally owned by William Caldry who accumulated his wealth through mining ventures. At this stage it was a vacant block of land and was sold to William Smyth (also Smythe), the member for Gympie in the Queensland Legislative Assembly, in 1882. The house and landscaped gardens were built around 1882 by William Smyth.

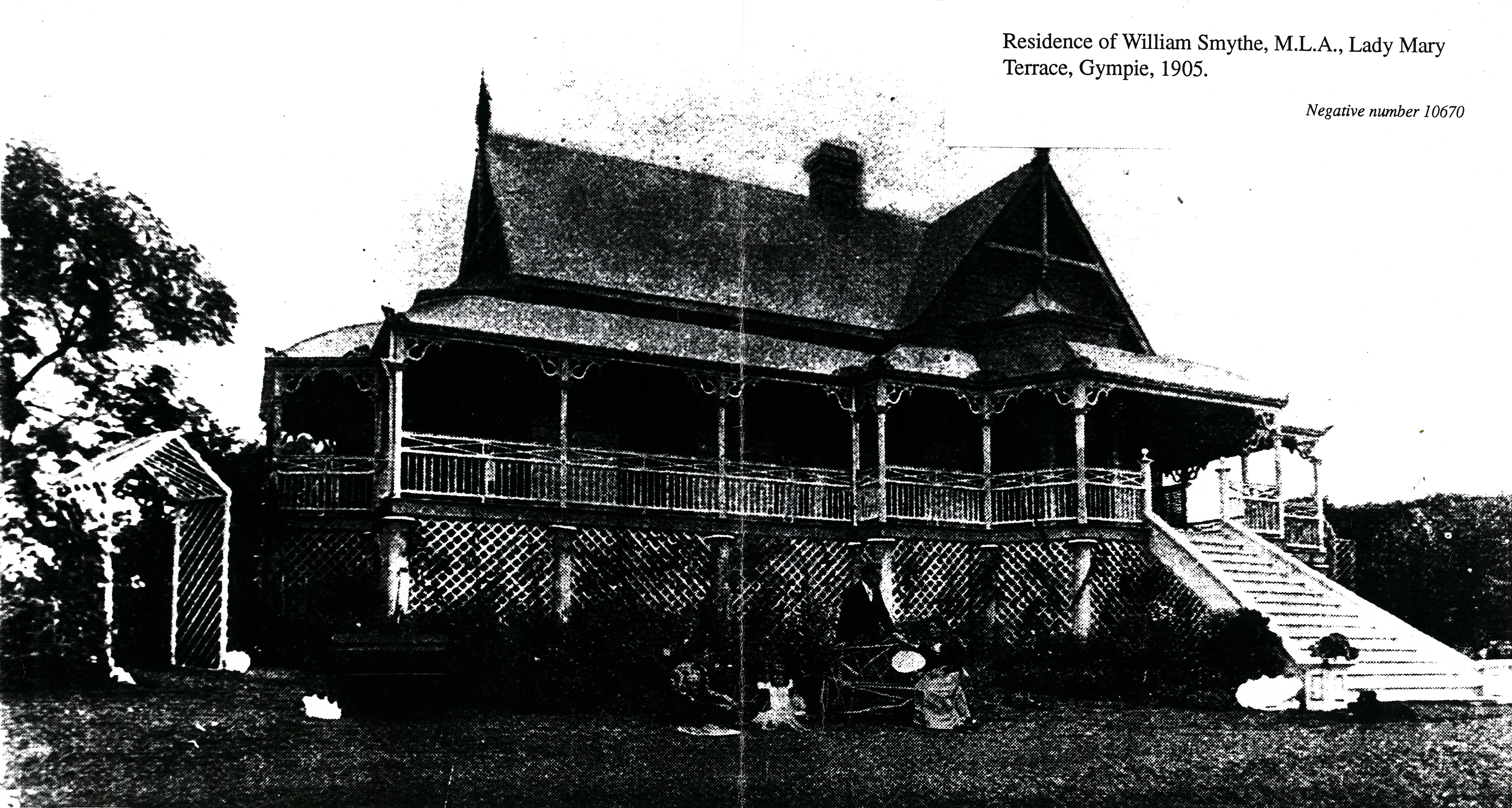

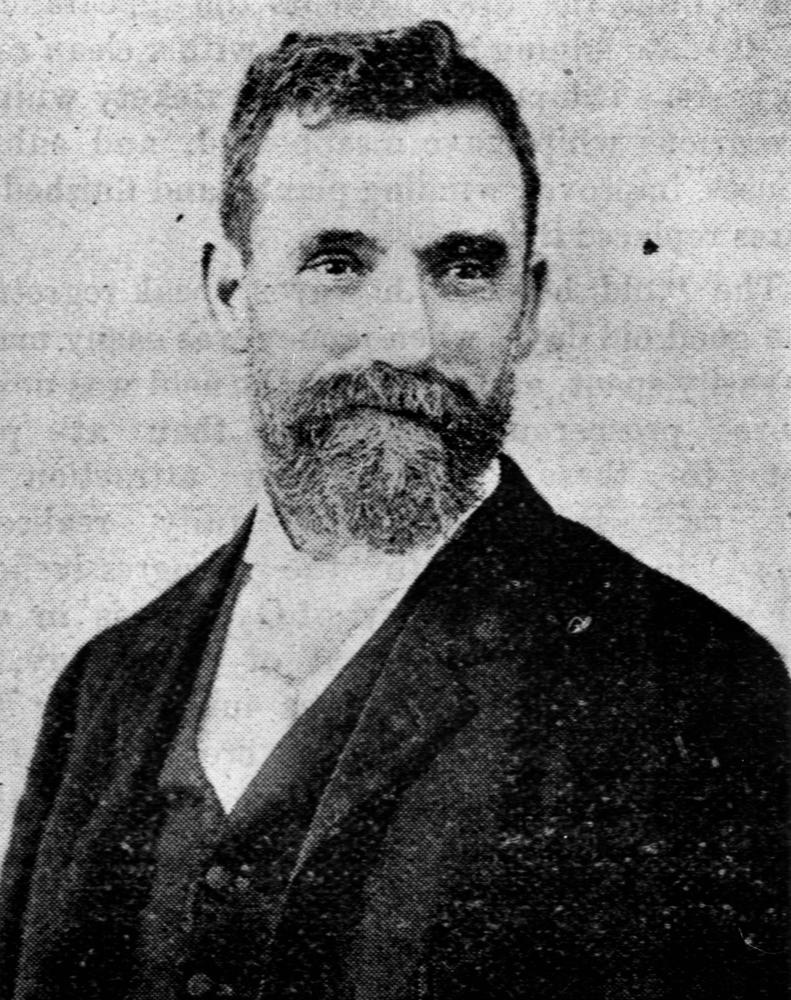
William Smyth

The building was then bought and used as a private residence until 2009 when Choice Support Services bought the building, renovated it and used it as a community centre to provide services for people with mental health issues.

The historic building was destroyed by fire on the 22 May 2012.
