= James Kidgell =

Australian politician

James Gawthorne Kidgell (8 April 1837 – 20 May 1915) was an Australian politician in Queensland. He was a Member of the Queensland Legislative Assembly for one term.

== Early life ==
Kidgell was born 8 April 1837 in Polesworth, Warwickshire, England. His parents were Henry Kidgell and Christina (née Gawthorne). He was educated at The Congregational College, Lewisham, Kent.

He moved to Australia in 1852.

== Career ==
Kidgell worked as a draper in Castlemaine, Victoria from 1853 to 1877.

He was employed as the Town Clerk of Borough of Gympie in 1880. Later he became the editor of The Gympie Times newspaper (the proprietor being Jacob Stumm).

He was also the editor of the Gundagai Times for some years. Subsequently, he moved to Melbourne where he established an advertising agency and was the printer of "The Woman", a paper for the Women's League.

== Politics ==
Kidgell was the Member of the Queensland Parliament for Gympie from March 1877 to November 1878.

== Personal ==
He married Anne Marie Quentin in 1871 and the couple had five sons and three daughters. His niece, Ada Augusta Kidgell, was also a journalist and novelist and married William Arthur Holman, Premier of New South Wales.

He retired from business about 1911 and settled in Myrrhee, Victoria.

Kidgell died 20 May 1915 in Myrnnhee. He was buried in Wangaratta cemetery.
