= Electoral district of Barambah =

Former state electoral district of Queensland, Australia

Barambah Queensland—Legislative Assembly
- State: Queensland
- Created: 1950
- Abolished: 2001
- Namesake: Barambah
- Demographic: Rural
- Coordinates: 26°17′S 151°57′E

Barambah was an electoral district of the Legislative Assembly in the Australian state of Queensland from 1950 to 2001.

The district was based in the South Burnett region. It was the seat of long-serving Premier, Sir Joh Bjelke-Petersen.

Barambah was created in 1950, essentially as a reconfiguring of the old seat of Nanango. Fittingly, when Barambah was abolished in 2001, it was replaced by a recreated Nanango.

The seat was safely conservative for its entire existence. However, it fell to the Citizens Electoral Council at the 1988 by-election called after Bjelke-Petersen was forced out of politics–the only seat ever won by that party at the state or federal level in Australia. The winner of that by-election, Trevor Perrett, joined the National Party later in 1988. He held the seat until 1998, when Dorothy Pratt won it as part of One Nation's breakthrough in Queensland. Pratt herself left the party in 1999, and transferred to Nanango after Barambah was abolished in 2001.

== Members for Barambah ==
Member	Party	Term
Joh Bjelke-Petersen	Country	1950–1974
Joh Bjelke-Petersen	National	1974–1987
Trevor Perrett	Citizens Electoral Council	1988
Trevor Perrett	National	1988–1998
Dorothy Pratt	One Nation	1998–1999
Dorothy Pratt	Independent	1999–2001

== See also ==
- Electoral districts of Queensland
- Members of the Queensland Legislative Assembly by year
- Category:Members of the Queensland Legislative Assembly by name
