= Electoral district of Nash =

Nash Queensland—Legislative Assembly
- State: Queensland
- Created: 1950
- Abolished: 1960
- Namesake: James Nash
- Demographic: Rural
- Coordinates: 26°11′S 152°40′E

The electoral district of Nash was a Legislative Assembly electorate in the state of Queensland, Australia. It was named after James Nash, the discoverer of gold in the area.

== History ==
Nash was created in the 1949 redistribution, taking effect at the 1950 state election, and existed until the 1960 state election. It centred on the town of Gympie.

When Nash was abolished in 1960, its area was incorporated into the recreated district of Gympie.

== Members ==
The following people were elected in the seat of Nash:

Member	Party	Term
Thomas Dunstan	Labor	1950–1953
Greg Kehoe	Labor	1953–1957
Greg Kehoe	QLP	1957
Max Hodges	Country	1957–1960

Dunstan previously represented Gympie (1935–1950).
Hodges subsequently represented Gympie (1960–1979).
