= George Ryland (Queensland politician) =

Australian politician (1855–1920)

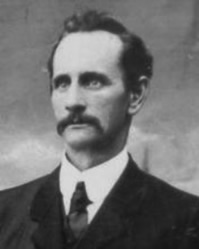

Member of the Queensland Legislative Assembly for Gympie
- In office 11 Mar 1899 – 27 Apr 1912 Serving with Andrew Fisher, Daniel Mulcahy
- Preceded by: William Smyth
- Succeeded by: George Mackay

Personal details
- Born: George Ryland; 1855 Attyconner, Westmeath, Ireland
- Died: 19 October 1920 (aged 64-65) Brisbane, Queensland, Australia
- Resting place: Gympie Cemetery
- Party: Labour Party
- Spouse(s): Mary Ann Newburn (m.1880 d.1898), Gertrude Newburn (m.1901)
- Occupation: Miner

George Ryland (1855 - 19 October 1920) was a member of the Queensland Legislative Assembly.

== Biography ==
Ryland was born at Attyconner, Westmeath, Ireland, the son of George Ryland Snr. and his wife Rachel (née Lee). He arrived in Queensland in 1866 and from 1875 until 1886 was a sugar and railway worker in Maryborough. In 1875 Ryland was working as a miner in Gympie and from 1890 was an organiser with the Amalgamated Miners' Association. After his time in the Queensland Parliament he was based in Port Darwin, as the Director of Lands for two years and then he worked in Brisbane as a valuator with the Public Curator's Office in 1915.

On 23 August 1880 he married Maria Ann Newburn and together had two sons and a daughter. Maria died in 1898 and Ryland then married Gertrude Newburn at Sydney in 1901. Ryland died in October 1920 and was buried in the Gympie Cemetery.

== Public career ==
Ryland started in politics as an alderman in the Borough of Gympie Council from 1892 until 1900 and was Mayor of the town in 1899.

In 1899, Ryland, a member of the Labour Party, won one of the two positions for the seat of Gympie The other member for Gympie after the election was Andrew Fisher, Prime Minister of Australia on three separate occasions. Ryland's wife was active in the campaign for women's and adult suffrage. When Queensland white women won the vote, Ryland introduced a deputation of women to the premier.

Ryland served the people of Gympie until his defeat at the 1912 Queensland state election by the Ministerialist candidate and future Speaker of the Australian House of Representatives, George Mackay.

Parliament of Queensland
Preceded by William Smyth	Member for Gympie; 1899–1912; Served alongside: Andrew Fisher, Daniel Mulcahy	Succeeded by George Mackay
