= Two Mile, Queensland =

Two Mile Gympie, Queensland
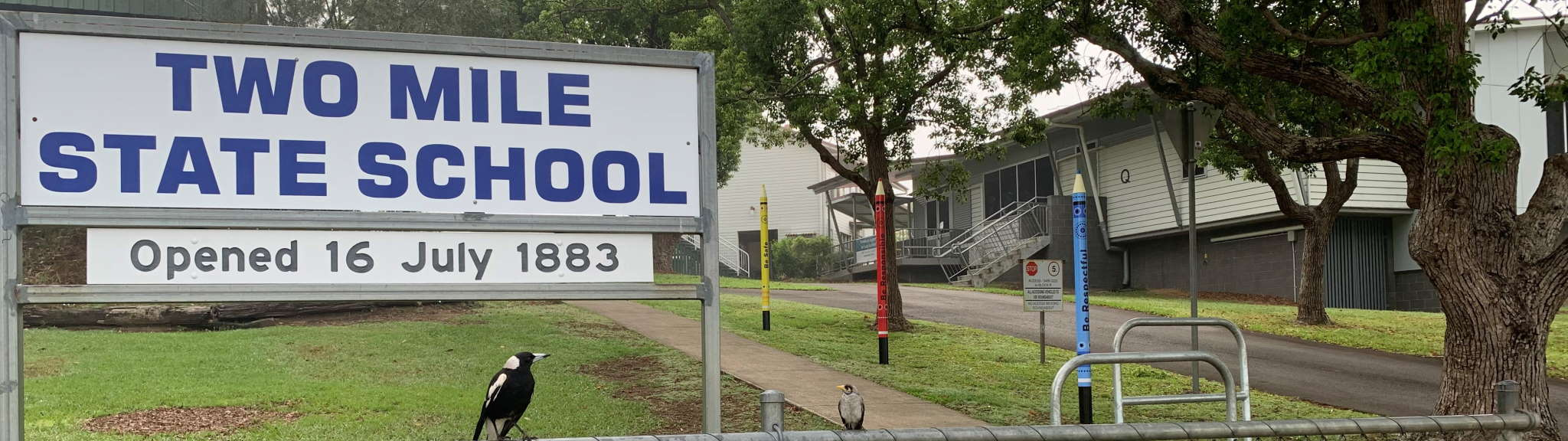
- Two Mile State School, 2025

- Coordinates: 26.1722°S 152.6347°E
- Population: 69 (2021 census)
  - Density: 16.8/km^{2} (43.6/sq mi)
- Postcode(s): 4570
- Area: 4.1 km^{2} (1.6 sq mi)
- Time zone: AEST (UTC+10:00)
- Location: 2.9 km (2 mi) NW of Gympie; 178 km (111 mi) N of Brisbane
- LGA(s): Gympie Region
- State electorate(s): Gympie
- Federal division(s): Wide Bay
Suburbs around Two Mile:
Chatsworth	Chatsworth	Araluen
Fishermans Pocket	Two Mile	Gympie
Fishermans Pocket	Widgee Crossing North	Gympie

Two Mile is a rural locality in the Gympie Region, Queensland, Australia. In the 2021 census, Two Mile had a population of 69 people.

== Geography ==
Two Mile is 2.9 kilometres (2 mi) north-west from the centre of Gympie.

== History ==
Two Mile State School opened on 9 July 1883.

== Demographics ==
In the 2016 census, Two Mile had a population of 106 people.

In the 2021 census, Two Mile had a population of 69 people.

== Heritage listings ==
Two Mile has the following heritage listings:

- Two Mile School, 288 Bruce Highway

== Education ==
Two Mile State School is a government primary (Prep-6) school for boys and girls at 288 Bruce Highway North (26.1707°S 152.6427°E). In 2018, the school had an enrolment of 67 students with 7 teachers (5 full-time equivalent) and 9 non-teaching staff (4 full-time equivalent).

There are no secondary schools in Two Mile. The nearest government secondary school is James Nash State High School in Gympie to the east.

There are also a number of non-government schools in Gympie and its suburbs.
