= Vivian Tozer =

Australian politician (1870–1954)

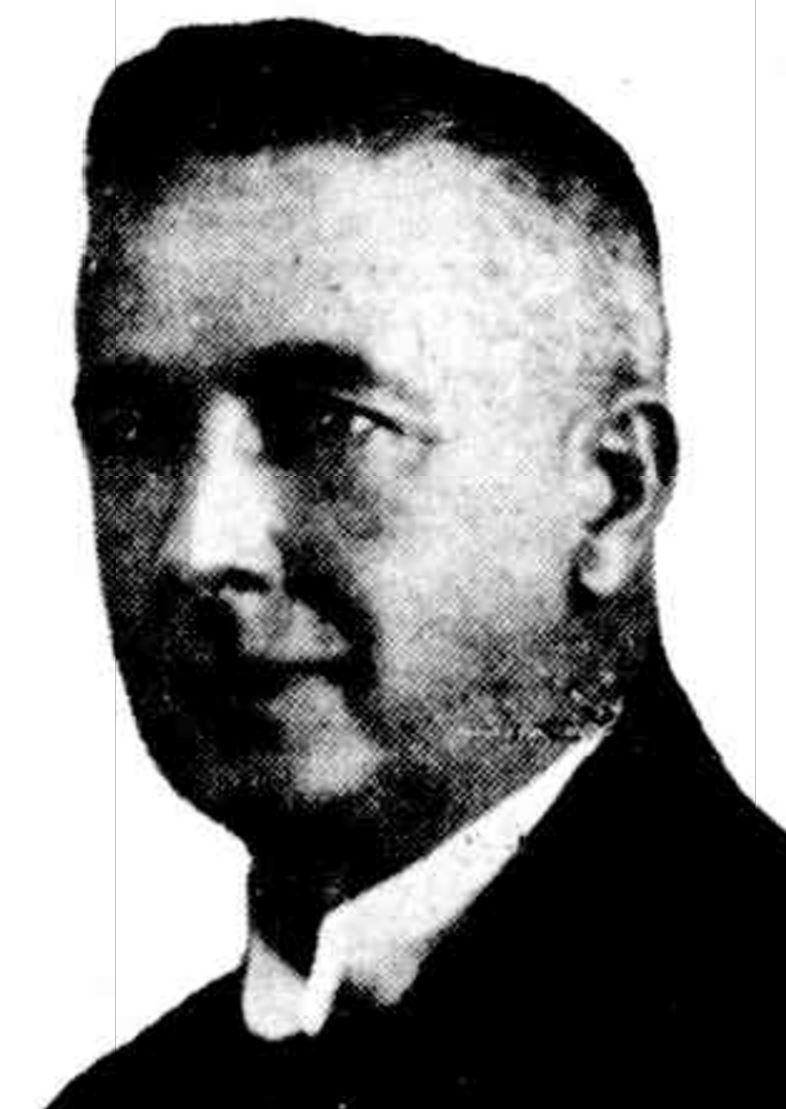
- Vivian Tozer, 1932

Member of the Queensland Legislative Assembly for Gympie
- In office 11 May 1929 – 11 May 1935
- Preceded by: Thomas Dunstan
- Succeeded by: Thomas Dunstan

Personal details
- Born: Vivian Hoyles Tozer; 27 May 1870 Gympie, Queensland, Australia
- Died: 5 September 1954 (aged 84) Gympie, Queensland, Australia
- Resting place: Gympie Cemetery
- Party: Country and Progressive National Party
- Spouse: Mary Anne Farrelly (m.1907 d.1954)
- Occupation: Solicitor

Vivian Hoyles Tozer (1870–1954) was a solicitor and politician in Queensland, Australia. He was a Member of the Queensland Legislative Assembly.

== Early life ==
Vivian Hoyles Tozer was born on 27 May 1870 in Gympie, the son of Horace Tozer (a Member of the Queensland Legislative Assembly for Wide Bay) and his wife Mary Hoyles (née Wilson). He was involved in the Wide Bay Light Horse Regiment and was a keen rifleman.

== Politics ==
A member of the Country and Progressive National Party, Tozer represented Gympie in the Queensland Legislative Assembly from 11 May 1929 to 11 May 1935.

== Later life ==
Tozer donated the land on which Gympie State High School stands.

Tozer died on 5 September 1954 in Gympie, survived by his wife and son. His funeral was held at St Peter's Church of England in Gympie on 6 September, after which he was buried in the Gympie Cemetery.

Parliament of Queensland
Preceded by Thomas Dunstan	Member for Gympie; 1929–1935	Succeeded by Thomas Dunstan
