= Thomas Dunstan (Australian politician) =

Australian politician (1873–1954)

The Honourable Thomas Dunstan

Member of the Queensland Legislative Assembly for Gympie
- In office 22 May 1915 – 11 May 1929
- Preceded by: George Mackay
- Succeeded by: Vivian Tozer
- In office 11 May 1935 – 29 Apr 1950
- Preceded by: Vivian Tozer
- Succeeded by: Seat abolished

Member of the Queensland Legislative Assembly for Nash
- In office 29 Apr 1950 – 7 Mar 1953
- Preceded by: New seat
- Succeeded by: Greg Kehoe

Personal details
- Born: Thomas Dunstan; 20 April 1873 Thames, New Zealand
- Died: 19 June 1954 (aged 81) Gympie, Queensland, Australia
- Resting place: Gympie Cemetery
- Party: Labor
- Spouse: Mary Lydement (m.1901 d.1952)
- Occupation: Journalist

Thomas Dunstan (20 April 1873 – 19 June 1954) was a member of the Queensland Legislative Assembly.

== Early life ==
Dunstan was born at Thames, New Zealand, the son of Nicholas John Dunstan and his wife Esther Mary Ann (née Connon). His brothers were George and William Dunstan. He was educated at Thames State School and the One Mile State School in Gympie. On leaving School he was an apprentice with The Gympie Times newspaper before joining the Gympie Truth as a reporter, secretary, and canvasser. In 1901, he was promoted to editor-manager of the Truth and held this position for the next 41 years and in 1943 was the editor of the Labor Leader.

On 27 February 1901 he married Mary Lydement (died 1952) and together they had five sons and two daughters. Dunstan died at Gympie in June 1954 and was accorded a state funeral which proceeded from St Peter's Church of England in Gympie to the Gympie Cemetery.

== Public life ==
Dunstan, a member of the Labor Party, won the seat of Gympie in 1915, defeating the Ministerial candidate and sitting member, George Mackay. Mackay later went on to have a successful career in the federal parliament. Dunstan held the seat until 1929 when he was defeated by Vivian Tozer of the CPNP.

He contested Gympie at the 1932 state elections once again losing to Tozer. In 1935 however, Dunstan won back the seat and went on to represent it until it was abolished in 1950. He then contested and won the new electorate of Nash, and holding it until he retired from politics three years later at 80 years of age.

During his parliamentary career he held the following roles:

- Temporary Chairman of Committees 1920–1924
- Temporary Chairman of Committees 1939–1949
- Secretary for Public Lands 1925–1929
- Minister without Office 1925–1925

Parliament of Queensland
Preceded by George Mackay	Member for Gympie; 1915–1929	Succeeded by Vivian Tozer
Preceded by Vivian Tozer	Member for Gympie; 1935–1950	Abolished
New seat	Member for Nash; 1950–1953	Succeeded by Greg Kehoe
