= David Gibson (Australian politician) =

Australian politician

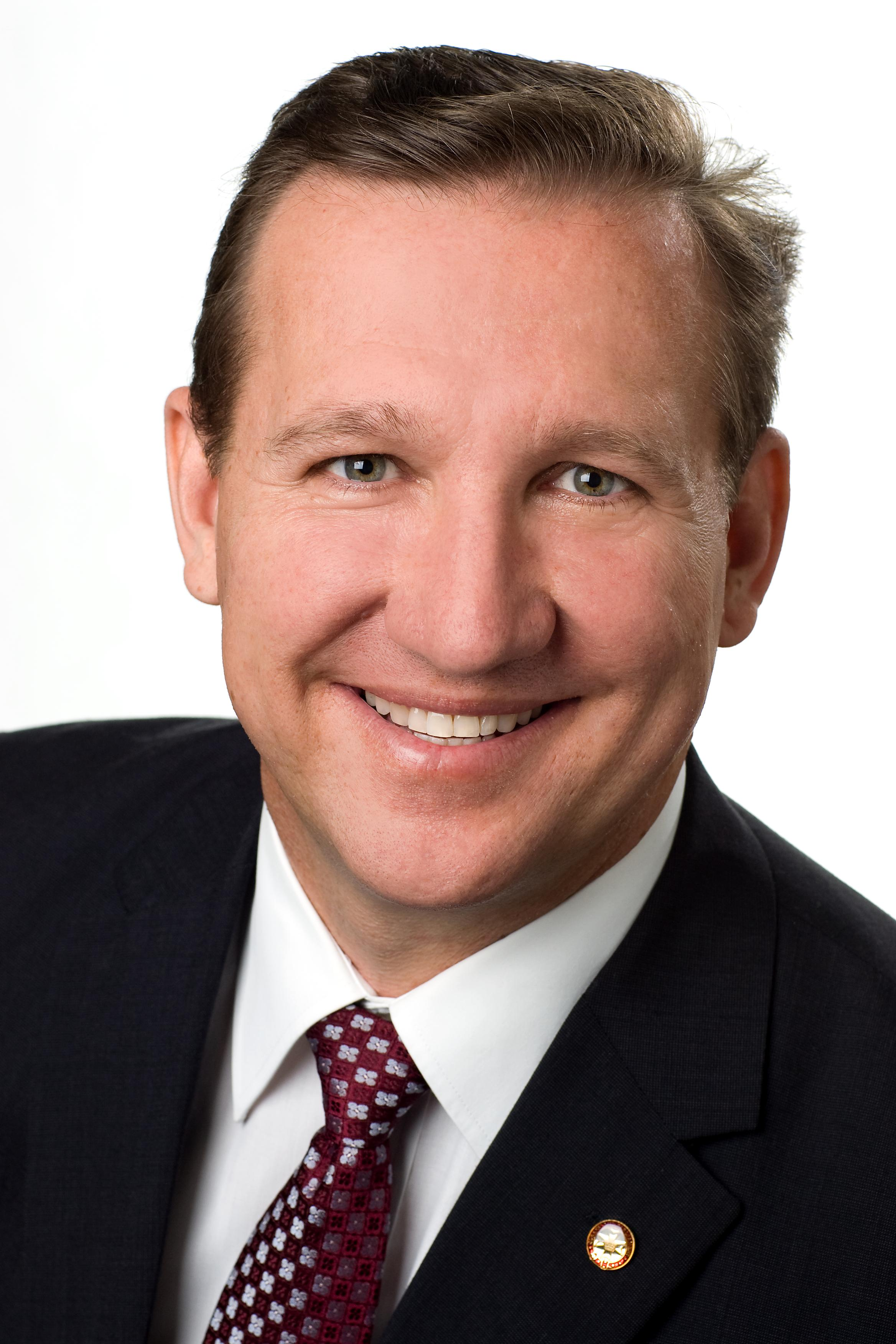

Chair, State Development, Infrastructure and Industry Committee
- In office 15 November 2012 – 31 January 2015
- Preceded by: Ted Malone

Minister for Police and Community Safety of Queensland
- In office 3 April 2012 – 16 April 2012
- Premier: Campbell Newman
- Preceded by: Neil Roberts (Police, Corrective Services and Emergency Services)
- Succeeded by: Jack Dempsey

Member of the Queensland Parliament for Gympie
- In office 9 September 2006 – 31 January 2015
- Preceded by: Elisa Roberts
- Succeeded by: Tony Perrett

Personal details
- Born: David Francis Gibson; 13 October 1967 (age 59) Fremantle, Western Australia
- Party: Liberal National (2008–2015)
- Other political affiliations: National (2006–2008)
- Awards: Australian Defence Medal

Military service
- Branch/service: Australian Army
- Rank: Captain

David Francis Gibson (born 13 October 1967) is an Australian former politician who was the 18th member for Gympie in the Legislative Assembly of Queensland from 2006 to 2015. In January 2015 Gibson retired from State politics.

== Early life ==
Born in Fremantle, Western Australia, as the eldest of two children to deaf parents. As a child of deaf adults he took on the role of interpreting for his parents to help them communicate in a hearing world.

== Early career ==
Gibson began his military career in 1985 as an Army Reserve private in the West Australian University Regiment while still at high school. In 1986 he entered the Royal Military College Duntroon and graduated serving as an Army officer for 8½ years before embarking on a career in media marketing and management. In 2001 he started working for the APN newspaper NewsMail as its newspaper sales and marketing manager. In June 2004 he was promoted as to the position of general manager of the APN publication The Gympie Times in Gympie, Queensland.

== Parliamentary career ==
Gibson was elected to the Queensland Parliament at the September 2006 state election, winning the safe independent seat of Gympie for the National Party from a field of seven candidates. In the 52nd Parliament he served on the Public Accounts Committee. Promoted to shadow cabinet 16 months after entering Parliament he took on the responsibilities as Shadow Minister for Sustainability, Climate Change & Innovation, and Shadow Minister for Clean Energy Strategy.

After his re-election in the March 2009 state election, the electorate of Gympie was the safest seat in the Parliament according to the post-election pendulum. He held the senior portfolio as the Shadow Minister for Infrastructure and Planning until September 2010.

Gibson was the first member of any Parliament in Australia to give a maiden speech in sign language and many give him credit for lobbying to bring the National Week of Deaf People activities into the Parliament, including the provisions of interpreters for question time and a debate between members of the deaf community and members of parliament on disability issues in 2009. David was also the first MP to engage a deaf student as an intern.

Prior to the 2012 state election, Gibson was the Shadow Minister for Local Government and the Shadow Minister for Sport. Following the LNP's winning government in the 2012 state election he was promoted to minister for Police and Community Safety. He resigned in April 2012 when it was revealed that he had been caught driving while unlicensed.

On 18 July 2012, the Newman government unveiled a plan to reinvigorate the Mary Valley, after the previous Labor Government's failed Traveston Crossing Dam project, and appointed Gibson to chair the Mary Valley Economic Development Advisory Group.

On 15 November 2012, Gibson was appointed to chair the State Development, Infrastructure and Industry Committee.

In his valedictory speech on the 27 November 2014 he said to parliament using Auslan "I use sign language to remind us all that we come here to give a voice to those who elect us. We must be true to them."

=== Public life ===
Although a member of a conservative political party, David Gibson defended LGBTIQ rights during his time in politics. Gibson was often described as a vocal progressive moderate within the Liberal National Party, particularly during the civil union debate in Queensland. In 2010, Hansard records his support for "having the age of consent for heterosexual and homosexual sex made the same age" and that "There is no reason we should discriminate between male and female and between gay and straight."

Gibson claimed he was targeted by his colleagues for these and other progressive views, which led to a nervous breakdown, resulting in him not contesting the 2015 state election. After politics Gibson advocated for mental health care and in 2021 revealed how he was driven towards suicide by an internecine plot within his own party to oust him from politics.

Gibson also faced a number of controversies during his time as a Member of Parliament, including historical allegations of theft from his time in the Australian Army in the 1990s, and of unlicensed driving and of a speeding fine from before he was Police Minister.

== After Parliament ==
Since retiring from the Queensland Parliament, Gibson has remained active on various not-for-profit boards while continuing his advocacy and volunteer work both nationally and internationally. He has spoken on the global stage, presenting at the World Federation of the Deaf conference in Budapest in 2017, and the CODA International Conference in San Diego in 2024. Gibson has also authored several articles, including "Disability, Inclusion and Democracy – an Uncomfortable Fit" and, more recently, "Queering Up the Debate: Freedom of Speech Seen Through a LGBTI Lens" in 2023. His volunteer work has included roles in DFAT-funded aid programs, and he has chaired the committee overseeing the restructuring of CODA International for global representation.

He has also had various articles published, including "Disability, Inclusion and Democracy - an Uncomfortable Fit" in the journal of the Australasian Study of Parliament Group and "Queering Up the Debate: Freedom of Speech seen through a LGBTI lens".

=== Volunteer work in Bhutan ===
In 2024, Gibson took on the role of Deaf Advocacy and Empowerment Mentor at the Wangsel Institute for the Deaf in Bhutan as part of the Australian Volunteers International program.

As a volunteer, Gibson's work focused on three main objectives:

- Enhancing the advocacy skills of Deaf individuals, enabling them to engage in personal, individual, and systematic advocacy.
- Laying the foundation for the establishment of a Deaf organisation in Bhutan, with the goal of joining the World Federation of the Deaf.
- Empowering Deaf individuals in Bhutan to become role models within their local communities and across the country.

Gibson's work has been instrumental in supporting the Bhutanese Deaf community in its efforts to establish a Bhutan Deaf Organisation to achieve greater inclusivity and recognition on both a national and international level.

=== Board work ===
Gibson currently serves on the board and as Chair of GRAI - GLBTI Rights in Ageing Inc. In 2024 the Minister for Social Services, the Hon Amanda Rishworth MP appointed Mr Gibson to the National Carer Strategy Advisory Committee.

He has also served as the chairman of Deaf Services a not for profit company working with the community to enhance services and programs that benefit deaf and hard of hearing across Australia, and as chairman of Jacaranda Housing, a non-profit, community housing provider in Brisbane. and on the board of Valued Lives.

He is also a former director of Deafness Forum, a national peak body representing the interests and viewpoints of the deaf, hard of hearing and deaf-blind communities, and former chair of the Queensland Chapter of the Australasian Study of Parliament Group, a non-partisan body to encourage and stimulate research, writing and teaching about parliamentary institutions in Australia to generate a better understanding of their functions.

In 2015 he took on a 2-year role as the executive director of the Gympie Music Muster, an Australian music festival held in the Amamoor Creek State Forest near Gympie, Queensland. In 2017 he became the CEO of Access Plus WA Deaf (the former WA Deaf Society Inc) and finished in that role in April 2020.

== See also ==
- Politics of Australia

Parliament of Queensland
Preceded by Elisa Roberts	Member for Gympie; 2006–2015	Succeeded by Tony Perrett
Political offices
Preceded by Ted Malone	Chair, State Development, Infrastructure and Industry Committee; 2012–present	Incumbent
Political offices
Preceded by Neil Roberts as Minister for Police, Corrective Services and Emergency Services	Minister for Police and Community Safety; 2012	Succeeded by Jack Dempsey
