= James Nash (prospector) =

James Nash (5 September 1834 – 5 October 1913) is popularly acknowledged as the first person to discover gold in 1867, in the area of Queensland, Australia now known as Gympie.

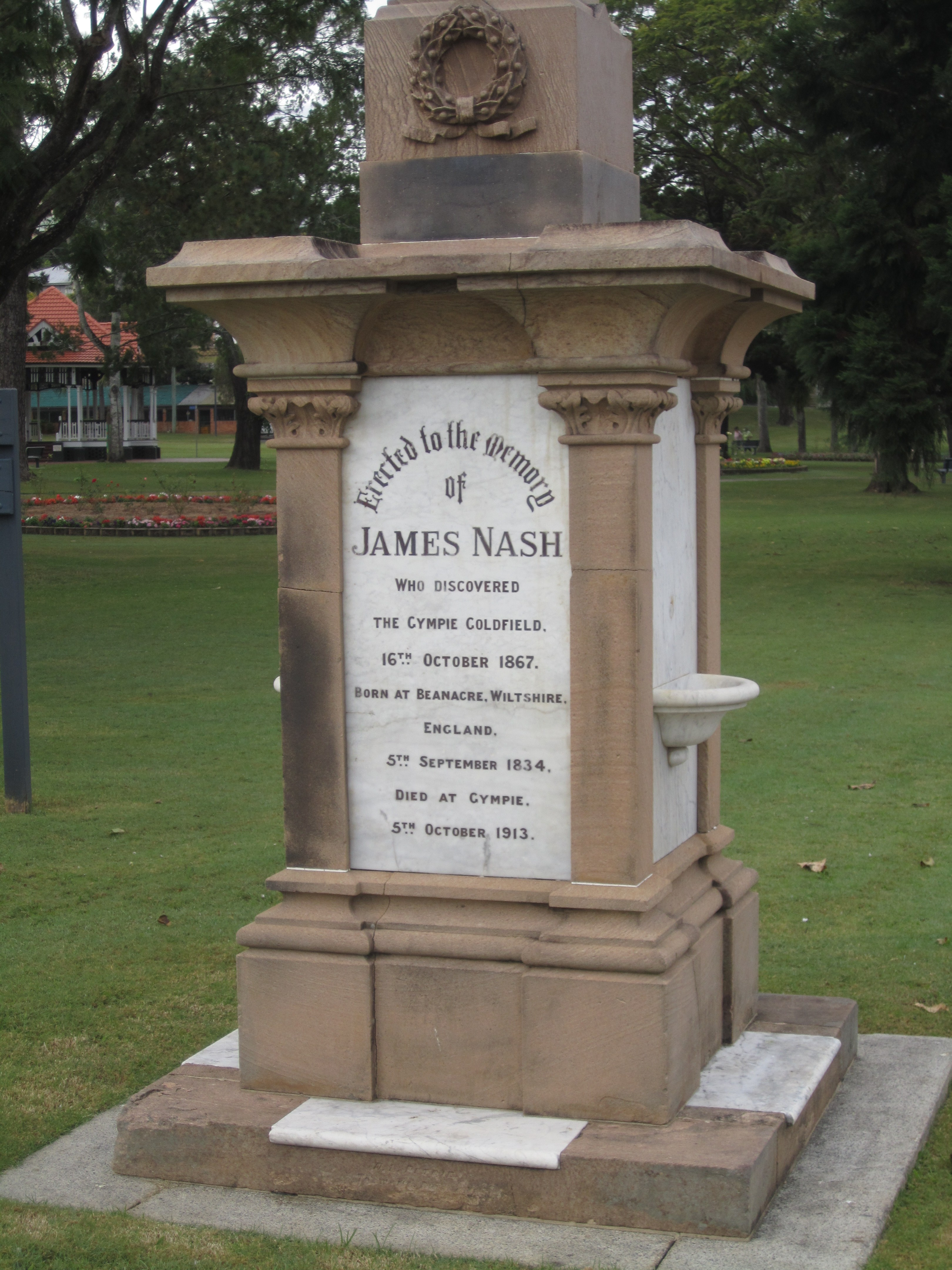
Memorial at Gympie Memorial Park

Nash was born in Beanacre, Wiltshire, England, and migrated to Sydney, New South Wales, at the age of 23. In 1863 he moved to Queensland, working at Calliope and Nanango. Nash found rich gold deposits on an extended prospecting tour in 1867 near the Mary River, and his report on 16 October started 'one of the wildest rushes in Queensland history'.

Nash died in Gympie, Queensland on 5 October 1913.

== Legacy ==
James Nash State High School in Gympie (opened in 1977) and the Electoral district of Nash (in the Gympie area) are named for him.
