= Len Stephan =

Australian politician

Queensland Government Chief Whip
- In office 6 September 1989 – 6 December 1989
- Premier: Mike Ahern; Russell Cooper
- Preceded by: Tony FitzGerald
- Succeeded by: Bill Prest

Member of the Queensland Legislative Assembly for Gympie
- In office 1 September 1979 – 17 February 2001
- Preceded by: Max Hodges
- Succeeded by: Elisa Roberts

Personal details
- Born: Leonard William Stephan; 25 July 1935 Brisbane, Queensland, Australia
- Died: 2 September 2012 (aged 77) Gympie, Queensland, Australia
- Party: National Party
- Relations: Iris Elizabeth Mary Stephan (sister); Alwin Frederick Stephan (brother); Edward Henry Stephan (brother); Mervyn Frank Stephan (brother); Vera Hilda Stephan (sister)
- Parent(s): Frederick William Stephan; Hilda Franziska Benfer

Leonard William Stephan (25 July 1935 – 2 September 2012) was an Australian politician. He was a National Party member of the Legislative Assembly of Queensland from 1979 to 2001, representing the electorate of Gympie.

== Early life ==
Born in Brisbane, Stephan was a farmer, Shire of Widgee councillor and Gympie Agricultural Society president before entering politics.

== Politics ==
Stephan was elected to the safe National seat of Gympie at the 1979 Gympie by-election. He served as Deputy Government Whip from 1987 to 1989, and Government Whip from September to December 1989. He briefly served in the shadow ministry under Russell Cooper and Rob Borbidge in the early 1990s, serving as Opposition Spokesman on Regional Development and Forestry from 1990 to 1991, and Opposition Spokesman on Forestry and Administrative Services from 1991 to 1992, but had returned to the backbench by the National Party's 1995 election victory.

Stephan won his closest re-election in many years in 1998 against a One Nation candidate; he retired at the 2001 state election, at which the National Party lost Gympie to One Nation's Elisa Roberts.

Parliament of Queensland
Preceded by Max Hodges	Member for Gympie; 1979 – 2001	Succeeded by Elisa Roberts
