= William Smyth (Australian politician) =

Australian politician

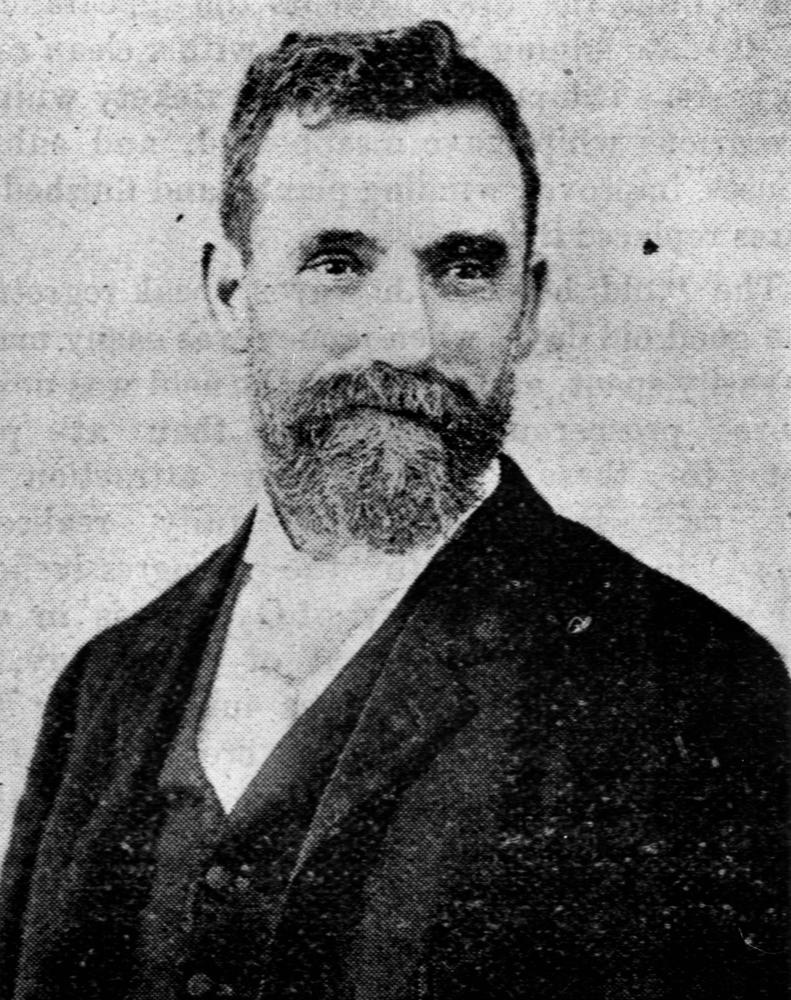

Member of the Queensland Legislative Assembly for Gympie
- In office 7 September 1883 – 11 March 1899 Serving with Matthew Mellor, Andrew Fisher, Jacob Stumm
- Preceded by: John Hamilton
- Succeeded by: George Ryland

Personal details
- Born: William Smyth; 13 May 1846 Sydney, New South Wales, Australia
- Died: 17 July 1899 (aged 53) London, England
- Resting place: Brookwood Cemetery; 51°17′51″N 0°37′35″W
- Party: Ministerial
- Spouse(s): Margaret Moore, Nellie Warner (m.1892)
- Occupation: Company director

William Smyth (1846–1899) was a politician in Queensland, Australia. He was a Member of the Queensland Legislative Assembly for Gympie. He was mayor of Gympie from 1883 to 1884. He built and occupied 30 Lady Mary Terrace, Gympie.

Parliament of Queensland
Preceded by John Hamilton	Member for Gympie; 1883–1899; Served alongside: Matthew Mellor, Andrew Fisher, Jacob Stumm	Succeeded by George Ryland
