= Trevor Perrett =

Australian politician (1941–2022)

Member of the Queensland Legislative Assembly for Barambah
- In office 14 April 1988 – 13 June 1998
- Preceded by: Joh Bjelke-Petersen
- Succeeded by: Dorothy Pratt

Personal details
- Born: Trevor John Perrett; 2 August 1941 Kingaroy, Queensland, Australia
- Died: 10 July 2022 (aged 80) Kingaroy, Queensland, Australia
- Party: Nationals
- Other political affiliations: Citizens Electoral Council
- Children: Tony Perrett

Trevor John Perrett (2 August 1941 – 10 July 2022) was an Australian politician. He was a member of the Legislative Assembly of Queensland from 1988 to 1998, representing the electorate of Barambah. Perrett was elected at the 1988 Barambah state by-election as an Citizens Electoral Council candidate. In December 1988 he switched to the Nationals. He represented the seat until his defeat by One Nation candidate Dorothy Pratt at the 1998 state election.

Perrett was Minister for Primary Industries, Fisheries and Forestry in the government of Rob Borbidge from 1996 to 1998. In 1998, it was revealed that he had been in a sexual relationship lasting several years with a prostitute, Colleen Jefferies, who was found dead in her Brisbane home in 1996 in suspicious circumstances.

== Post politics ==
In 2021, the Townsville Child Protection Investigation Unit Historical Team charged Parrett with 25 counts of historical child sexual abuse, including one count of rape. All the incidents involved a single girl under the age of 14, over a two-year period in the 1970s. In 2022, the Director of Public Prosecutions determined it did not have a strong enough chance of success in the case.

Perrett died in 2022.

Parliament of Queensland
Preceded by Joh Bjelke-Petersen	Member for Barambah; 1988–1998	Succeeded by Dorothy Pratt
