= Elisa Roberts =

Australian politician (born 1970)

Member of the Queensland Legislative Assembly for Gympie
- In office 17 February 2001 – 9 September 2006
- Preceded by: Len Stephan
- Succeeded by: David Gibson

Personal details
- Born: Elisa Mary Roberts; 3 September 1970 (age 56) Sydney, Australia
- Party: Independent (since 2002)
- Other political affiliations: Pauline Hanson's One Nation (2001–2002)
- Education: University of New South Wales
- Occupation: Defence Force employee (Australian Army)
- Profession: Soldier politician

Military service
- Allegiance: Commonwealth of Australia
- Branch/service: Australian Army
- Years of service: 1989–1993
- Rank: Private

Elisa Mary Roberts (born 3 September 1970) is a former Australian politician. Born in Sydney, she served with the Australian Defence Force at Victoria Barracks in Paddington from 1989 to 1993, and received her Bachelor of Arts from the University of New South Wales in 1996. Having moved to Queensland, she was elected to the Legislative Assembly of Queensland in 2001 as the member for Gympie, representing Pauline Hanson's One Nation. She left the party on 18 April 2002 to sit as an independent, leaving only two One Nation MPs in the Parliament. She was re-elected as an independent in 2004, but was defeated in 2006 by National Party candidate David Gibson. She re-contested Gympie in 2009 but was unsuccessful.

Parliament of Queensland
Preceded by Len Stephan	Member for Gympie; 2001–2006	Succeeded by David Gibson
