= Tony Perrett =

Australian politician

The Honourable Tony Perrett MP

Member of the Queensland Legislative Assembly for Gympie
- Incumbent
- Assumed office 31 January 2015
- Preceded by: David Gibson
- Majority: 8.49%

Shadow Minister for Agriculture, Fisheries and Forestry
- In office 15 December 2017 – 28 October 2024
- Leader: David Crisafulli
- Preceded by: Dale Last

Personal details
- Party: Liberal National Party
- Parent: Trevor Perrett (father)
- Website: https://tonyperrett.com.au/

Anthony John Perrett is an Australian politician. He has been the Liberal National Party member for Gympie in the Queensland Legislative Assembly since 2015.

== Biography ==
Tony Perrett is the son of former Borbidge Ministry Primary Industries Minister Trevor Perrett.

He has previously served as the Deputy Mayor and Division 6 Councillor of the Gympie Regional Council and as a Councillor on the Kilkivan Shire Council before 2008 as well as former state president, federal secretary and vice-president of the Young Nationals.

After the 2017 State Election, Perrett was appointed to the Shadow Ministry, holding the Agriculture, Fisheries and Forestry portfolio under Deb Frecklington and David Crisafulli

Parliament of Queensland
Preceded by David Gibson	Member for Gympie; 2015–present	Incumbent
