= Greg Kehoe =

Australian politician

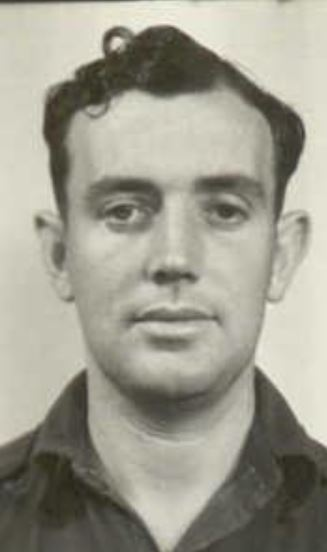
- Gregory Brian Kehoe, during World War II service, circa 1940s

Member of the Queensland Legislative Assembly for Nash
- In office 7 March 1953 – 3 August 1957
- Preceded by: Thomas Dunstan
- Succeeded by: Max Hodges

Personal details
- Born: 1 May 1917 Warwick, Queensland, Australia
- Died: 18 February 2005 (aged 87) Gold Coast, Queensland, Australia
- Party: Labor
- Other political affiliations: Queensland Labor Party
- Spouse: Cecily Agnes White
- Occupation: Magistrate, Solicitor

Gregory Brian Kehoe (1 May 1917–18 February 2005) was a politician in Queensland, Australia. He was a Member of the Queensland Legislative Assembly.

== Early life ==
Kehoe was born on 1 May 1917 at Warwick, Queensland, the son of Stephen Kehoe and his wife Teresa Mary (née Flynn). He attended school at St Patrick's Convent, Christian Brothers College, Gympie and then attended the Teachers' Training College, Brisbane.

He lived in Gympie where he worked as a stipendiary magistrate. He served in World War II in the 42nd Battalion in the Salamaua–Lae campaign in New Guinea from 1941 to 1945.

== Personal life ==
He married Cecily Agnes White on 5 June 1948; the couple had 2 sons. He was a member of the Gympie Hospital Board, the vice-president of the Gympie branch of the Australian Labor Party and the president of the Gympie State Service Union. He was a Roman Catholic.

== Politics ==
At the 1953 election, Kehoe was elected to the Legislative Assembly of Queensland in the seat of Nash representing the Labor Party. He held the seat of Nash in the 1956 election. On 26 April 1957, he followed Queensland Premier Vince Gair when he broke away from the ALP and formed the Queensland Labor Party (QLP). However, he was defeated at the 1957 election by Allen Hodges, the Australian Country Party candidate.

Kehoe moved to Brisbane, living in Hawthorne. In the 1960 election, Kehoe as the QLP candidate contested the seat of Hawthorne in Brisbane against the ALP candidate William Baxter but Baxter won. In the 1963 election, Kehoe contested the seat of South Brisbane for the QLP, but was defeated by the sitting ALP member Col Bennett.

== Later life ==
Kehoe died on 18 February 2005 at the Gold Coast, Queensland, aged 87.

== See also ==
- Members of the Queensland Legislative Assembly, 1953–1956
- Members of the Queensland Legislative Assembly, 1956–1957
- Candidates of the Queensland state election, 1960
- Candidates of the Queensland state election, 1963

Parliament of Queensland
Preceded by Thomas Dunstan	Member for Nash; 1953–1957	Succeeded by Max Hodges
