= Max Hodges =

Australian politician

The Honourable Max Hodges

Member of the Queensland Legislative Assembly for Nash
- In office 3 August 1957 – 28 May 1960
- Preceded by: Greg Kehoe
- Succeeded by: Seat abolished

Member of the Queensland Legislative Assembly for Gympie
- In office 28 May 1960 – 8 August 1979
- Preceded by: New seat
- Succeeded by: Len Stephan

Personal details
- Born: Allen Maxwell Hodges; 11 February 1917 Brisbane, Queensland, Australia
- Died: 31 July 2009 (aged 92) New Farm, Queensland, Australia
- Resting place: Gympie Cemetery
- Spouse(s): Rita Fox Currant (1939-1969; her death); 3 children Pamela Helen Hayward (1973-1978; her death)
- Occupation: Farmer

Allen Maxwell Hodges (11 February 1917 – 31 July 2009) was a member of the Queensland Legislative Assembly.

== Early life ==
Hodges was born in Brisbane, Queensland, the son of Arthur John Hodges and his wife Helen Allen (née Mitchell). His great-grandfather, William Mitchell, had represented the seat of Maryborough in the Queensland Legislative Assembly in 1904–1909. He was educated in Maryborough and on leaving school he did farm-related work.

During World War II he served in the 2nd AIF, being stationed at New Guinea and Borneo, and was discharged in 1946 at the rank of staff sergeant.

Hodges married Rita Fox Currant on 19 December 1939 and together had a son and two daughters. Rita died in 1969, and he then married Pamela Helen Hayward (who died in 1978) on 23 April 1973.

== Public life ==
Hodges, a member of the Country Party, won the seat of Nash at the 1957 Queensland state election. The seat was renamed Gympie at the 1960 state election, and he went on to represent it until he retired from politics in 1979.

He held many positions in parliament including:

- Member of the Parliamentary Printing Committee 1957–1960
- Member of the Parliamentary Building Committee 1960–1962
- Temporary Chairman of Committees 1963–1968
- Minister for Works and Housing 1968–1974
- Minister for Works and Housing and Minister for Police 1974–1975
- Minister for Police and Leader of the House 1975–1976
- Minister for Tourism and Maritime Services 1976–1979

Not long after being promoted to the role of Police Minister, Hodges appointed Ray Whitrod with a view to cleaning up the corruption in the police force. He found himself clashing with the Premier on issues, and eighteen months after being made Police Minister he was removed from the portfolio.

== Later life ==
Hodges died in July 2009 at New Farm in Brisbane and was buried in the Gympie Cemetery.

Parliament of Queensland
Preceded by Greg Kehoe	Member for Nash; 1957–1960	Abolished
New seat	Member for Gympie; 1960–1979	Succeeded by Len Stephan
