= 1988 Barambah state by-election =

Election in an Australian state

- 16 April 1988

Electoral district of Barambah in the Queensland Legislative Assembly
- Turnout: 84.90% (▼8.63)
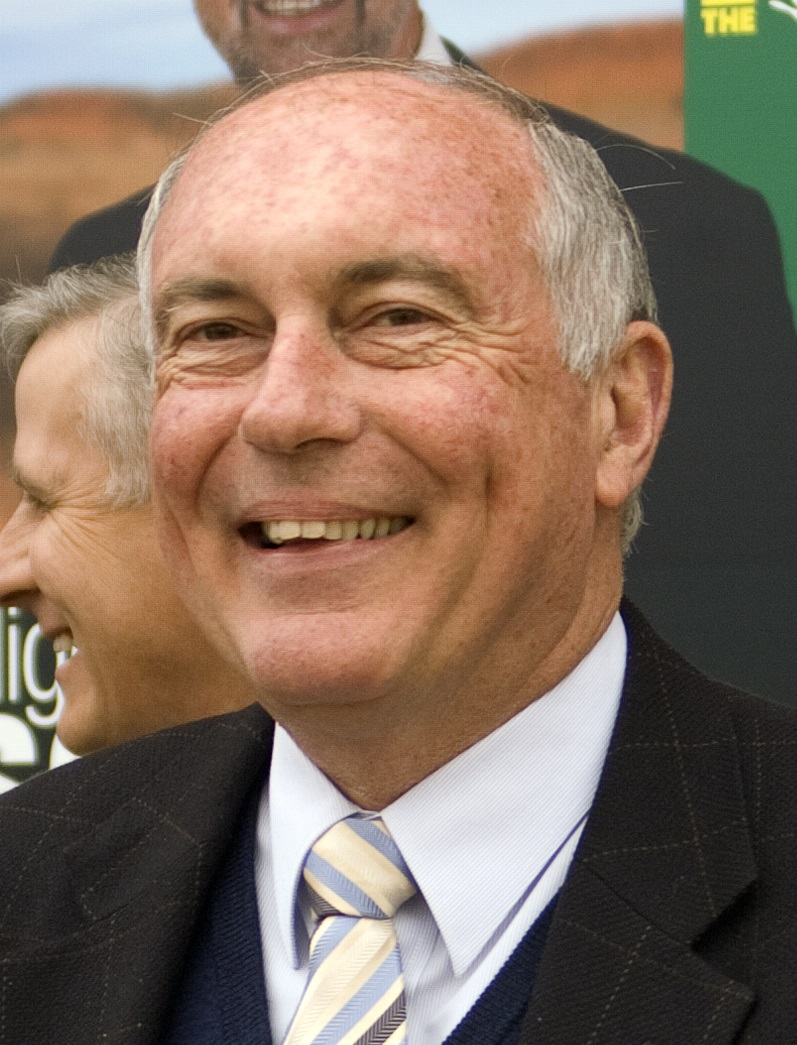

	First party	Second party	Third party
		CEC
Candidate	Warren Truss	Trevor Perrett	John Lang
Party	National	CEC	Labor
Primary vote	4,754	3,639	2,033
Percentage	41.27%	31.59%	17.65%
Swing	▼36.20	▲31.59	▼4.88
2CP	45.89%	54.11%
2CP swing	▼31.58	▲54.11
MP before election
Sir Joh Bjelke-Petersen
National
Elected MP
Trevor Perrett
Citizens Electoral Council

The 1988 Barambah state by-election was held on 16 April 1988 to elect the member for Barambah in the Queensland Legislative Assembly, following the resignation of resignation of National MP and former premier Sir Joh Bjelke-Petersen. Until the by-election, the seat had been considered the Nationals' safest seat in Queensland.

== Candidates ==
The candidates were:

- Warren Truss of the National Party, the chairman of the Shire of Kingaroy;
- Trevor Perrett, a Kingaroy grazier and former National Party member who represented the Citizens Electoral Council, a conservative party;
- John Lang of the Labor Party; and
- Kevin Polzin, a Wondai peanut farmer who used the title "New Country Party" (not related to the New Country Party which was formed by former One Nation members in 2003).

== Results ==
The result was a shock to most observers, and came about largely because 89% of Labor voters' preferences went to the CEC. It was seen by contemporary observers as a clear setback to new party leader Mike Ahern in his efforts to stabilise the party ahead of the 1989 election.

Barambah state by-election, 1988
Party	Candidate	Votes	%	±%
National	Warren Truss	4,754	41.27	−36.20
Citizens Electoral Council	Trevor Perrett	3,639	31.59	+31.59
Labor	John Lang	2,033	17.65	−4.88
New Country Party	Kevin Polzin	1,092	9.48	+9.48
Total formal votes		11,518	98.15	+0.88
Informal votes		216	1.85	−0.88
Turnout		11,734	84.90	−8.63
Two-candidate-preferred result
Citizens Electoral Council	Trevor Perrett	6,232	54.11	+54.11
National	Warren Truss	5,286	45.89	−31.58
Citizens Electoral Council gain from National		Swing	N/A	

== Aftermath ==
Though elected as a Citizens Electoral Council candidate, Trevor Perrett defected to the National Party in December 1988, and was re-elected as a National candidate at the 1989 state election. Perrett became a minister in the Coalition government of Rob Borbidge and held the seat of Barambah until his defeat at the 1998 state election.

Defeated National Party candidate Warren Truss was elected as the member for the division of Wide Bay at the 1990 Australian federal election. He served as a minister in the government of John Howard and became federal leader of the National Party in 2007 and Deputy Prime Minister of Australia in 2013 and served as a minister in the governments of Tony Abbott and Malcolm Turnbull.

== See also ==
- List of Queensland state by-elections
