= Robert Lord (Australian politician) =

Australian politician

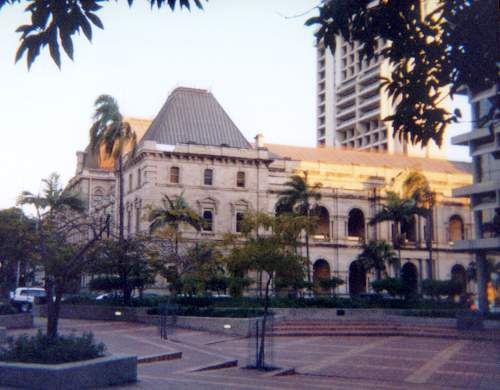
Parliament House, Brisbane

Robert Stuart Lord (1844 – 23 July 1878) was a politician in Queensland, Australia. He was a Member of the Queensland Legislative Assembly.

== Early life ==
Lord was born in 1844 in (Sydney, New South Wales, Australia). His parents were Simeon Lord Jnr (1810–1892) and Sarah (née Birch). Lord's family had connections to Australia dating back to his grandfather Simeon Lord (c. 28 January 1771 – 29 January 1840), a transported convict. Lord was educated in England and came to Queensland in 1866.

Robert Lord married Louise, relict of the late J. Wickey Stable, Esq., solicitor, of Toowoomba, Queensland on the 3rd June 1871, at St. Jude's Randwick, N.S.W.

== Politics ==
In 1870 he was appointed a magistrate of the territory in Ravenswood Queensland. In 1871 he was appointed as one of the trustees of the Racecourse Reserve in Gympie.

Lord represented the electoral district of Gympie from 7 November 1873 to 9 March 1877.

== Later life ==
Lord died on 23 July 1878 in Gympie. His obituary appeared in the Hobart Mercury on 12 August 1878 as well as in many Queensland newspapers including The Queenslander.
