= Australian Citizens Party =

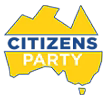
- Abbreviation: Citizens Party; ACP
- National Leader: Craig Isherwood
- National Chairman: Robert Barwick
- Founder: Craig Isherwood; Maurice Hetherington
- Founded: 1988; 38 years ago
- Headquarters: Coburg, Victoria, Australia
- Newspaper: The New Citizen
- Ideology: Dirigisme; Australian nationalism; American System; Anti-Americanism; Sinophilia; Climate change denial; Syncretism
- Political position: Syncretic
- International affiliation: None; LaRouche movement prior to 2015
- Colours: Green-Brown
- House of Representatives: 0 / 151
- Senate: 0 / 76
- NSW Legislative Council: 1 / 42

Website
- citizensparty.org.au

The Australian Citizens Party (ACP), formerly the Citizens Electoral Council of Australia (CEC), is a minor political party in Australia headquartered in Coburg, Victoria. It was founded in 1988 by Craig Isherwood and Maurice Hetherington and is led by Craig Isherwood and Robert Barwick. The party is federally registered with the Australian Electoral Commission (AEC) and publishes an in-house newspaper, The New Citizen, and a weekly subscription magazine, the Australian Alert.

The ACP campaigns on "restoring Australia’s national and economic sovereignty", with a focus on foreign policy independence from the US and UK, and banking reform, including a new government-owned bank with, with a retail division operating in post offices, a focus on banking reform, a "Glass–Steagall" division of Australia's banks separating commercial from investment banking; an amendment to the Banking Act guaranteeing Australian bank deposits against a "bail-in".

The party was affiliated with American political activist Lyndon LaRouche and the international LaRouche Movement until 2015, and pushed conspiracy theories, including that international action on climate change and indigenous land rights was part of a fraud masterminded by Prince Philip, as part of the British royal family's scheme to depopulate the planet. It ‘believes Prince Philip is trying to break up nation-states through the World Wide Fund for Nature and is involved in a "racist plot to splinter Australia"’. More recently, the ACP has gained attention for its campaigns promoting its policies, including retaining cash transactions, defending sacked Australia Post CEO Christine Holgate, and saving regional banking services, as well as for its strong defence of the Australia–China relationship.

== History ==
Australian Citizens Party was founded in 1988 as the Citizens Electoral Council by Craig Isherwood and Maurice Hetherington. Its main aim was to lobby for binding voter-initiated referendums. CEC candidate Trevor Perrett won the 1988 Barambah state by-election in Queensland, after former Queensland Premier Sir Joh Bjelke-Petersen resigned in 1987. However, Perrett switched to the National Party in December 1988.

By 1989, the CEC leadership was under the influence of the Lyndon LaRouche movement. By 1992, the CEC identified itself as the Australian branch of the broad international LaRouche movement. National Secretary Craig Isherwood moved the headquarters from rural Queensland to a Melbourne suburb, with direct communications links to LaRouche's US headquarters established.

In 1996, then-Liberal Party MP Ken Aldred was disendorsed by the Liberal Party after using parliamentary privilege to make allegations that a prominent Jewish lawyer and a senior foreign affairs official were involved in espionage and drug trafficking. Aldred made the claims using documents supplied to him by the CEC that were later found to be forged.

Australian Electoral Commission (AEC) first registered the CEC as a federal party on 27 June 1997, deregistered it in December 2006 under new integrity rules, and re-registered it on 4 September 2007 after the organisation demonstrated the statutory membership minimum.

In 2017, the CEC argued that the Financial Sector Legislation Amendment (Crisis Resolution Powers) Bill would allow for a bail-in of bank deposits. This led to an inquiry by the Senate Economics Legislation Committee, which received a high volume of public submissions. Despite those objections, the bill was rushed through on 14 February 2018 in a voice vote with only seven senators present; the AEC then worked with One Nation senator Malcolm Roberts to introduce the Banking Amendment (Deposits) Bill 2020. Following a second inquiry, the bill was defeated by the major parties.

In 2019, the AEC initiated a national campaign opposing the Morrison government's Currency (Restrictions on the Use of Cash) Bill, which proposed to criminalize cash transactions exceeding A$10,000. A subsequent Senate inquiry into the bill received hundreds of public submissions. On 6 December 2020, the Senate unanimously voted to remove the bill from its notice paper, preventing its further consideration.

On 13 January 2020, the AEC approved the change of name, abbreviation and logo to Australian Citizens Party, a renaming the leadership said would emphasise grass-roots populism over "electoral councils."

In October 2020, Prime Minister Scott Morrison instructed Australia Post chief executive Christine Holgate to stand aside from her position. Holgate later described this directive to a Senate committee as "one of the worst acts of bullying" she had experienced. The ACP worked with licensed post-office owners to organize public support for Holgate, arguing that her Bank@Post agreement protected the postal network from the effects of bank branch closures. Following lobbying efforts, a Senate inquiry was established. The inquiry's May 2021 report concluded that there were no grounds for Holgate's dismissal and recommended that the Prime Minister issue a formal apology.

In August 2024, The Australian reported that a government-owned "post office bank" was under consideration by the Albanese government's policy agenda, following years of lobbying by the ACP and associated post-office groups. The proposal outlined an institution that would use Australia Post's more than 4,200 outlets to provide in-person banking services, cash access, and low-cost credit to individuals and businesses.

In 2026, it was reported that ACP would be merging with the Gerard Rennick People First party later that year.

In November 2026, NSW MLC Taylor Martin announced his candidacy for the Legislative Council as the lead candidate for the Australian Citizens Party at the 2027 New South Wales state election.

== Funding ==
In 2004, the CEC received the largest contribution of any political party, $862,000 from a central Queensland cattle farmer and former CEC candidate named Ray Gillham. The party collected $2.3 million in donations in 2020–21. In the 2022–23, it raised approximately $1.4 million from 336 donations.

== Platform ==
The ACP's platform centers on the concept of national economic sovereignty. It advocates for protectionist economic policies, including the implementation of a Glass–Steagall–like separation of commercial and investment banking and the establishment of a national bank. The ACP states that such policies are necessary to counter the influence of international corporations and banks, which it claims have exploited Australia's natural resources.

In foreign affairs, the party opposes the AUKUS security pact, arguing that it compromises Australian sovereignty in favor of the United States and the United Kingdom. The ACP calls for Australia to become a republic and pursue a more independent foreign policy.

On domestic energy policy, the Citizens Party calls for the repeal of the prohibition on nuclear power, arguing it is a necessary component for energy security and a cleaner energy future. It also demands renationalization of the electricity grid, returning its ownership and control to the state to ensure affordable and reliable power for all Australians.

The ACP, citing historic figure King O'Malley as inspiration, lobbied for "the establishment of a National Bank and State Banks to provide loans at 2% or less to agriculture (family farms), industry and for infrastructure development", launching a petition in 2002 to drive support with a full page advertisement in The Australian newspaper. In early 2008 the CEC started campaigning for a "Bank Homeowners Protection Bill of 2008", calling for legislation in the spirit of the Australian moratorium laws enacted in the 1920s and 1930s. The party continues to campaign for establishing a government-owned bank using the Australia Post network.

The party follows the LaRouche line of denying the theory of anthropogenic global warming; it claimed in 2009 that the Copenhagen Summit, a climate conference occurring that year, was planning "massive population genocide‚ on a scale that would make Adolf Hitler blush" and the establishment of a "world government". The party espouses the claim that the Port Arthur massacre, in which Martin Bryant murdered 35 people and injured 37 others, was instigated by mental health institute the Tavistock Institute on the orders of the royal family, and that the Australian Liberal Party was founded by pro-Hitler fascists.

The CEC's other policies have included introducing a national Glass–Steagall Act to "break up the banks", introducing a moratorium on home & farm foreclosures, constructing high speed rail and the Bradfield Scheme, joining China's Belt and Road Initiative, shutting down Pine Gap and denying the existence of climate change.

== Reception ==
In 2007, the Anti-Defamation Commission of the Australian branch of B'nai B'rith (an international Jewish organisation) has published a Briefing Paper with details of the CEC's alleged antisemitic, anti-gay, anti-Aboriginal and racist underpinnings. The document cites CEC publications and quotes former CEC members. The CEC published a response to the ADC, stating it was an antiracist organisation.

Former members of the CEC and families of current members have accused the group of "brainwashing" members and engaging in campaigns involving "dirty tricks". For example, former CEC staffer Donald Veitch has claimed that new recruits undergo "deprogramming sessions" and that recruits are probed for sexual transgressions. Veitch has stated "The mind control operations commenced by Lyndon LaRouche in the USA in the mid-1970s are still being practised today within his movement in Australia".

== Electoral results ==
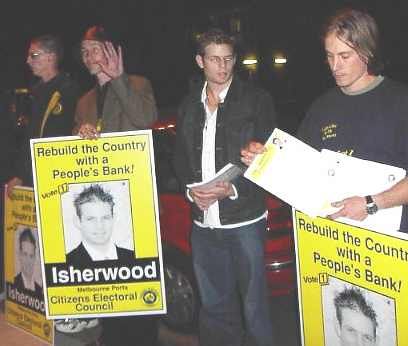
CEC members demonstrate outside an election meeting organised by the Australian Jewish News in Melbourne, September 2004. Aaron Isherwood (second from right) was the CEC candidate in the seat of Melbourne Ports at the 2004 federal election.

Despite running in "almost every election of the past two decades", in no election has the CEC ever garnered more than 2% of the vote.

At the 2007 federal election, the CEC's previous form continued. Its first preference votes in the lower house was 27,879 (0.22%), and 8,677 (0.07%) in the upper house, both results were 0.14% down from 2004.

At the 2016 federal election, CEC fielded senate candidates in every state and the Northern Territory and seven candidates for seats in the House of Representatives. Nationally, the party received 5,175 votes (0.04%) in the lower house and 9,850 votes (0.07%) in the upper house.

Senate
Election year	No. of overall votes	% of overall vote	No. of overall seats won	No. of overall seats	+/–
1990	7,129	0.07	0 / 40	0 / 76	—
1993	5,578	0.05	0 / 40	0 / 76	0
1998	9,403	0.08	0 / 40	0 / 76	0
2001	8,896	0.08	0 / 40	0 / 76	0
2004	24,663	0.21	0 / 40	0 / 76	0
2007	8,677	0.07	0 / 40	0 / 76	0
2010	13,243	0.10	0 / 40	0 / 76	0
2013	1,708	0.01	0 / 40	0 / 76	0
2016	9,850	0.07	0 / 40	0 / 76	0
2019	10,230	0.07	0 / 40	0 / 76	0
2022	29,799	0.20	0 / 40	0 / 76	0
2025	35,432	0.22	0 / 40	0 / 76	0

== See also ==
- Category:Australian Citizens Party politicians
- Political parties in Australia
- Gerard Rennick People First
