= George Mackay (Australian politician) =

Australian politician (1872–1961)

The Honourable George Mackay
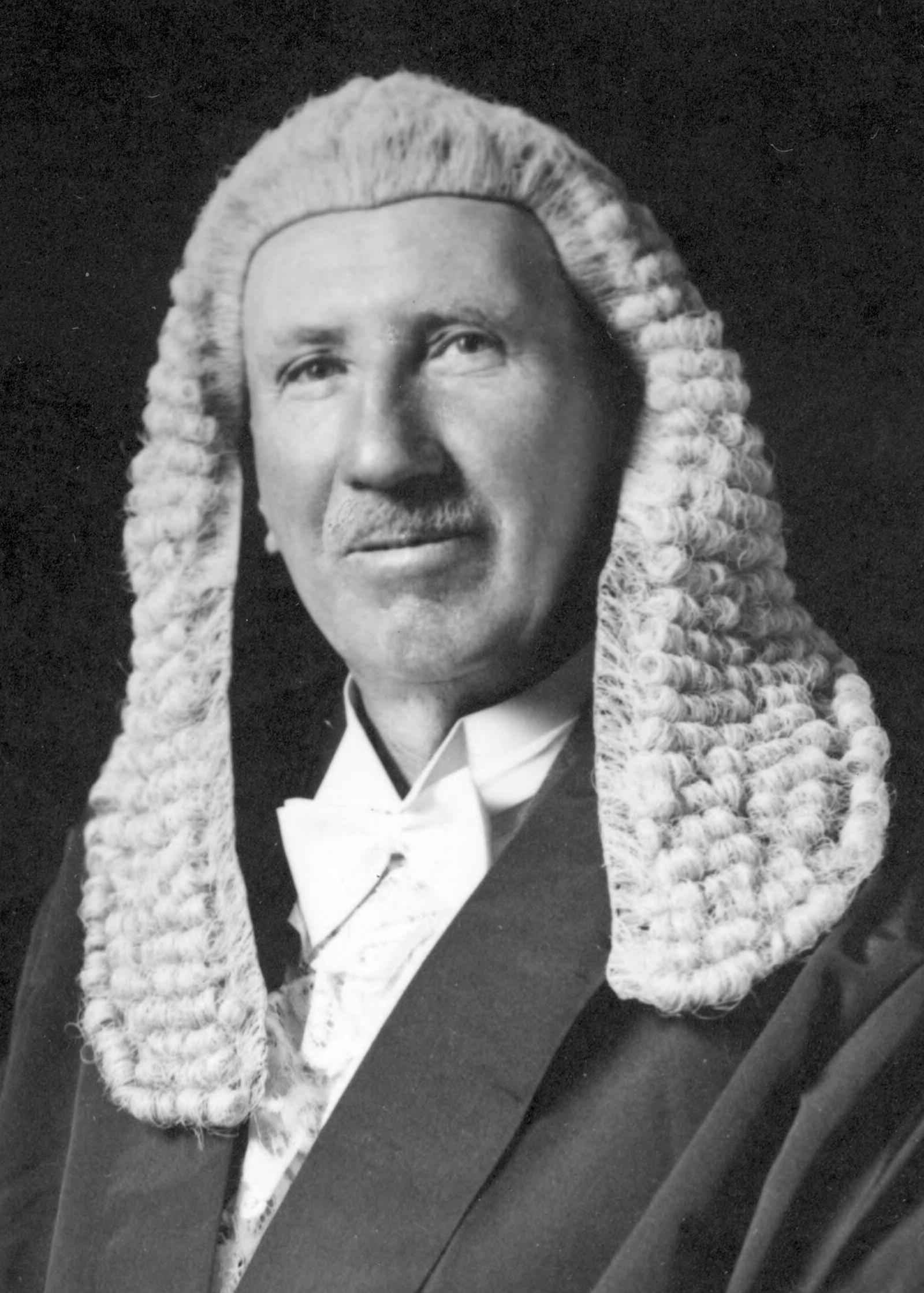

Speaker of the Australian House of Representatives
- In office 17 February 1932 – 7 August 1934
- Preceded by: Norman Makin
- Succeeded by: George Bell

Member of the Australian Parliament for Lilley
- In office 5 May 1917 – 7 August 1934
- Preceded by: Jacob Stumm
- Succeeded by: Donald Cameron

Member of the Queensland Legislative Assembly for Gympie
- In office 27 April 1912 – 22 May 1915
- Preceded by: New seat
- Succeeded by: Thomas Dunstan

Personal details
- Born: 20 March 1872 Clermont, Queensland, Australia
- Died: 5 November 1961 (aged 89) Gympie, Queensland, Australia
- Resting place: Gympie Cemetery
- Party: Liberal (state, until 1915), Nationalist (federal, 1917–31); UAP (1931–34)
- Spouse: Edith Ann Heard (m.1896 d.1958)
- Occupation: Real estate agent

George Hugh Alexander Mackay (20 March 1872 – 5 November 1961) was an Australian politician at state and federal level. He served in the Queensland Legislative Assembly as a Liberal from 1912 to 1915, before winning the Division of Lilley as a Nationalist at the 1917 federal election. Mackay joined the new United Australia Party (UAP) in 1931 and served as Speaker of the House of Representatives from 1932 until his retirement in 1934.

== Early life ==
Mackay was born at Copperfield, near Clermont in Queensland, to Scottish-born carpenter Hugh Mackay and Jane, née Baird. He attended the state schools at Clermont and Bundaberg before becoming an apprentice printer at the Peak Downs Telegram in 1887. In 1894 he was promoted to foreman printer, and finally became managing editor. He married Edith Ann Heard on 23 September 1896 at the Wesleyan Church in Clermont, after which he joined his sister Barbara in the local bookshop and newsagency. He was elected to Clermont Town Council in 1882 and served as mayor 1900–02.

Mackay moved to Lismore in New South Wales in 1902 before leasing a dairy farm at McLean's Ridge. Shortly afterwards, in 1905, the family moved back to Queensland, settling at Gympie, where Mackay opened an auctioneering and real estate business in partnership with Ray King. In 1911 he was elected to Gympie City Council; he was mayor in 1917.

== Politics ==
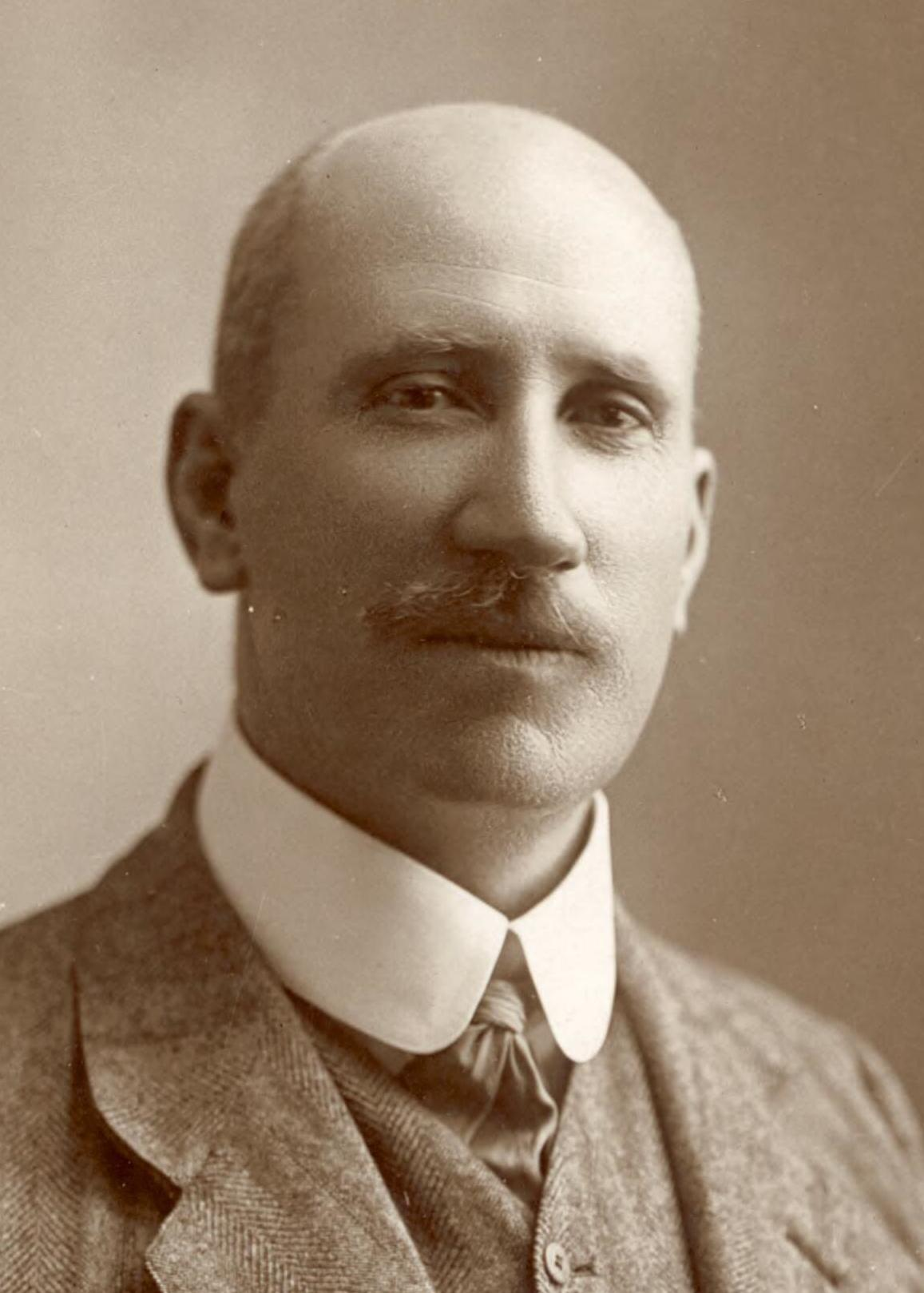
George Mackay

Mackay was elected to the Legislative Assembly of Queensland in 1912 as a Liberal member, representing the seat of Gympie. He was defeated in 1915, but in 1917 won the federal seat of Lilley as a Nationalist. In the House of Representatives he was known as a competent public speaker with a penchant for quoting figures; serving on the Joint Committee on Public Works (1920–28, chairman 1926–28), he was involved in the development of Canberra and the building of the Australian War Memorial. He stated that he had "no time for extremists or muddlers", and was known to dislike the Country Party.

In 1931, the Nationalist Party became the United Australia Party, and on 11 February 1932 Mackay was elected Speaker. In March 1934 he announced his retirement, stating that "one may remain in parliament too long".

== Later life ==
After his retirement, Mackay was interested in bowls, and he was president of the Gympie Bowling Club 1936–39. He was a devout Presbyterian and Freemason, and in 1952 wrote A summary of the history of the Gympie Presbyterian Church. He died on 5 November 1961 at Gympie and received a state funeral; he was buried at Gympie Cemetery. He was survived by a son.

Parliament of Australia
Preceded by Norman Makin	Speaker of the Australian House of Representatives; 1932–1934	Succeeded by George Bell
Preceded by Jacob Stumm	Member for Lilley; 1917–1934	Succeeded by Donald Charles Cameron
Parliament of Queensland
New seat	Member for Gympie; 1912–1915	Succeeded by Thomas Dunstan
