= The Gympie Times =

Daily newspaper in Queensland, Australia

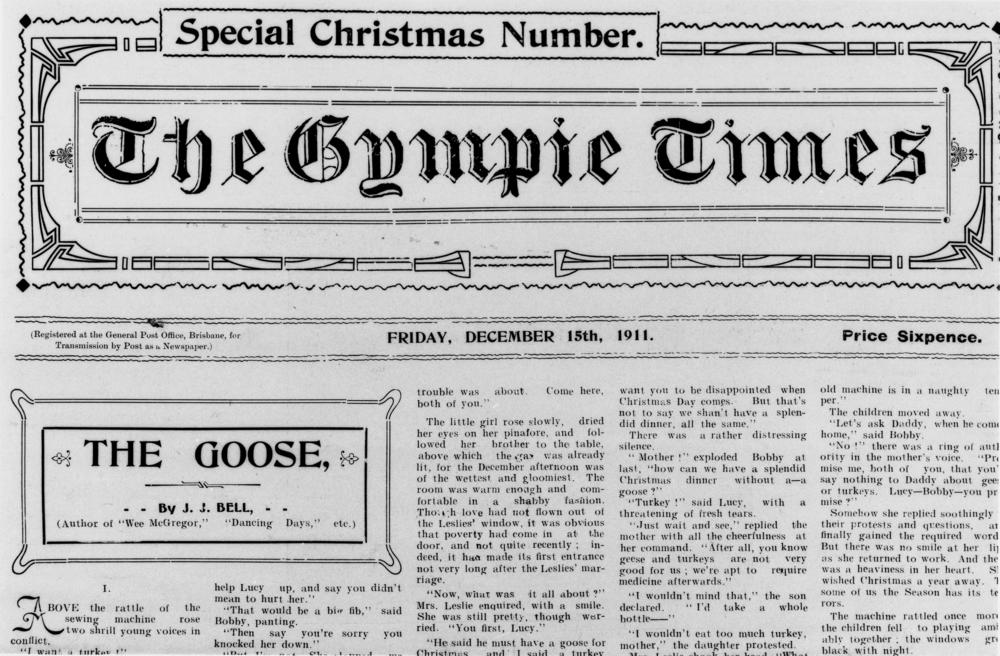
- Front page of the Gympie Times and Mary River Mining Gazette newspaper, 1911
- Type: newspaper
- Format: Tabloid
- Owner: News Corp Australia
- Editor: Shelley Strachan
- Founded: 1867
- Language: English
- Headquarters: Gympie, Queensland, Australia; PO Box 394; Gympie QLD 4570
- Circulation: 5,644 Monday-Friday; 8,630 Saturday
- Price: A$1.10 Monday-Friday; A$1.20 Saturday
- Website: gympietimes.com.au

The Gympie Times is an online newspaper serving Gympie in Queensland, Australia. The newspaper is owned by News Corp Australia and was published from Monday to Saturday but ceased printed publication in June 2020. The final printed edition was on Saturday 26 June 2020. It remains an online only news source.

The Gympie Times was circulated north to Tiaro, west to Kilkivan and south to Noosa. The circulation of The Gympie Times was 13,200 Monday to Friday and 21,600 on Saturday.

The Gympie Times website is part of News Corp Australia's News Regional Media network.

== History ==
The Gympie Times was founded just a few short months after a massive gold discovery on what was known then as Gympie Creek. Gold prospector James Nash wandered into the Mary Valley from the west in October, 1867, and struck a good show of gold at what became known as Nash's Gully (near the site of the present Town Hall).

He claimed the Queensland colony's reward for the first person to find payable gold within 100 miles of Brisbane and is credited with saving Queensland from bankruptcy. After recording his find, the government named the field Nashville and miners from all over the world and Australia flocked to the area in a major gold rush.

It was to this rag tag collection of tents and shanty dwellings that a robust band of newspapermen journeyed in early 1868 to set up the first newspaper, the Nashville Times and Mary River Mining Gazette. A heavy press and type had to be brought by bullock wagon from Ipswich and the first edition of the paper was produced as floodwaters swirled through the makeshift premises.

Nashville's name was later changed to Gympie to reflect the original name of the area and the gold mining era was long and successful, with deep mining well below the streets of a prosperous city which grew up around the miners.

A drop in the gold price in the early 20th century meant the end of gold mining as a major industry and dairy and beef production and the railway came to the fore. In recent years, the district's proximity to Brisbane and the Sunshine Coast has meant continued prosperity and development for Gympie without losing its country charm.

Along with many other regional Australian newspapers owned by NewsCorp, the Gympie Times ceased print editions in June 2020 and became an online-only publication.

== Digitisation ==
The paper has been digitised as part of the Australian Newspapers Digitisation Program of the National Library of Australia.

== See also ==
- List of newspapers in Australia
