= Electoral district of Gympie =

State electoral district of Queensland, Australia

Gympie Queensland—Legislative Assembly
- Map of the electoral district of Gympie, 2017
- State: Queensland
- Dates current: 1873–1950; 1960–present
- MP: Tony Perrett
- Party: Liberal National
- Namesake: Gympie
- Electors: 39,141 (2020)
- Area: 4,628 km^{2} (1,786.9 sq mi)
- Demographic: Provincial
- Coordinates: 26°12′S 152°47′E
Electorates around Gympie:
| Maryborough | Maryborough | Coral Sea |
| Nanango | Gympie | Noosa |
| Nanango | Glass House | Nicklin |

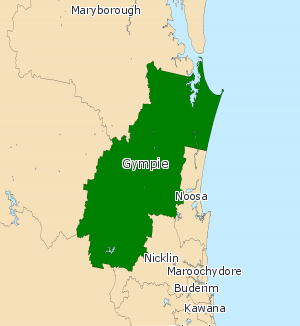
2008 map.

Gympie is an electoral district of the Legislative Assembly in the Australian state of Queensland The electorate is centred on the city of Gympie and stretches north to Rainbow Beach and as far south to Pomona.

The seat is currently held by Tony Perrett of the Liberal National Party.

The district's most famous former member is Andrew Fisher, who later became Prime Minister of Australia.

== Members for Gympie ==
Single member electorate (1873–1888)
| Member | Party | Term |
|---|---|---|
| Robert Lord | Unaligned | 1873–1877 |
| James Kidgell | Unaligned | 1877–1878 |
| John Hamilton | McIlwraith conservative | 1878–1883 |
| William Smyth | Unaligned | 1883–1888 |

Dual member electorate (1888–1912)
| Member | Party | Term | Member | Party | Term |
|---|---|---|---|---|---|
| William Smyth | Unaligned | 1888–1899 | Matthew Mellor | Unaligned | 1888–1893 |
| William Smyth | Unaligned | 1888–1899 | Andrew Fisher | Labour | 1893–1896 |
| William Smyth | Unaligned | 1888–1899 | Jacob Stumm | Ministerialist | 1896–1899 |
| George Ryland | Labour | 1899–1912 | Andrew Fisher | Labour | 1899–1901 |
| George Ryland | Labour | 1899–1912 | Daniel Mulcahy | Labour | 1901–1912 |

Single member electorate (1912–1950)
| Member | Party | Term |
|---|---|---|
| George Mackay | Ministerialist | 1912–1915 |
| Thomas Dunstan | Labor | 1915–1929 |
| Vivian Tozer | Country and Progressive National | 1929–1935 |
| Thomas Dunstan | Labor | 1935–1950 |

Single member electorate (1960–present)
| Member | Party | Term |
|---|---|---|
| Max Hodges | Country | 1960–1974 |
| Max Hodges | National | 1974–1979 |
| Len Stephan | National | 1979–2001 |
| Elisa Roberts | One Nation | 2001–2002 |
| Elisa Roberts | Independent | 2002–2006 |
| David Gibson | National | 2006–2008 |
| David Gibson | Liberal National | 2008–2015 |
| Tony Perrett | Liberal National | 2015–present |

== Election results ==
2024 Queensland state election: Gympie
| Party | Candidate | Votes | % | ±% |
|---|---|---|---|---|
| Liberal National | Tony Perrett | 17,530 | 46.43 | +4.01 |
| Labor | Lachlan Anderson | 8,849 | 23.44 | −5.20 |
| One Nation | Katy McCallum | 8,347 | 22.11 | +9.53 |
| Greens | Emma Buhse | 3,029 | 8.02 | +1.81 |
| Total formal votes | | 37,755 | 95.79 | +0.60 |
| Informal votes | | 1,661 | 4.21 | −0.60 |
| Turnout | | 39,416 | 89.06 | +0.03 |
Two-party-preferred result
| Liberal National | Tony Perrett | 24,448 | 64.75 | +6.26 |
| Labor | Lachlan Anderson | 13,307 | 35.25 | −6.26 |
| Liberal National hold | | Swing | +6.26 | |

2006 State Election Source: ECQ
| The Nationals | 47.47% |
| Ind. (ex-ALP) | 15.86% |
| Labor | 10.92% |
| Family First | 10.44% |
| Independent | 9.18% |

2004 State Election Source: ECQ
| Independent | 34.89% |
| Labor | 26.17% |
| The Nationals | 21.50% |
| Independent | 8.52% |
| One Nation | 8.49% |

2001 State Election Source: ECQ
| Labor | 32.61% |
| One Nation | 24.31% |
| The Nationals | 24.31% |
| CCA | 18.77% |
