= Electoral results for the district of Whitsunday =

Queensland, Australia, district election results

This is a list of electoral results for the electoral district of Whitsunday in Queensland state elections.

== Members for Whitsunday ==
Member	Party affiliation	Period
Lloyd Roberts	Country Party	1950–1961
Ron Camm	Country	1961–1974
Ron Camm	National	1974–1980
Geoff Muntz	National	1980–1989
Geoff Muntz	Independent	1989
Lorraine Bird	Labor	1989–1998
Harry Black	One Nation	1998–1999
Harry Black	City Country Alliance	1999–2001
Jan Jarratt	Labor	2001–2012
Jason Costigan	Liberal National	2012–2019
Jason Costigan	Independent	2019
Jason Costigan	North Queensland First	2019–2020
Amanda Camm	Liberal National	2020–present

== Election results ==
=== Elections in the 2020s ===
2024 Queensland state election: Whitsunday
Party	Candidate	Votes	%	±%
Liberal National	Amanda Camm	16,941	52.7	+19.9
Labor	Bauke Hovinga	7,264	22.6	−10.0
One Nation	Julie Hall	5,380	16.8	+7.4
Greens	Elena Quirk	1,570	4.9	+1.0
Family First	Peter Atchison	962	3.0	+3.0
Total formal votes		32,117	95.8	
Informal votes		1,420	4.2	
Turnout		33,537		
Two-party-preferred result
Liberal National	Amanda Camm	21,992	68.5	+15.2
Labor	Bauke Hovinga	10,125	31.5	−15.2
Liberal National hold		Swing	+15.2	

2020 Queensland state election: Whitsunday
Party	Candidate	Votes	%	±%
Liberal National	Amanda Camm	9,592	32.85	+0.69
Labor	Angie Kelly	9,523	32.61	+1.45
One Nation	Deb Lawson	2,742	9.39	−10.66
NQ First	Jason Costigan	2,735	9.37	+9.37
Katter's Australian	Ciaron Paterson	1,803	6.17	−2.98
Legalise Cannabis	Paul Hilder	1,417	4.85	+4.85
Greens	Emma Barrett	1,134	3.88	−1.84
United Australia	Greg Armstrong	255	0.87	+0.87
Total formal votes		29,201	96.33	+0.36
Informal votes		1,114	3.67	−0.36
Turnout		30,315	87.05	+0.73
Two-party-preferred result
Liberal National	Amanda Camm	15,552	53.26	+2.58
Labor	Angie Kelly	13,649	46.74	−2.58
Liberal National hold		Swing	+2.58	

=== Elections in the 2010s ===
2017 Queensland state election: Whitsunday
Party	Candidate	Votes	%	±%
Liberal National	Jason Costigan	8,774	32.2	−9.5
Labor	Bronwyn Taha	8,503	31.2	−4.7
One Nation	Noel Skippen	5,471	20.1	+20.1
Katter's Australian	Jenny Whitney	2,499	9.2	+9.2
Greens	Imogen Lindenberg	1,562	5.7	−0.9
Independent	Dan Van Blarcom	477	1.7	+1.7
Total formal votes		27,286	96.0	−1.9
Informal votes		1,147	4.0	+1.9
Turnout		28,433	86.3	−0.1
Two-party-preferred result
Liberal National	Jason Costigan	13,829	50.7	+0.1
Labor	Bronwyn Taha	13,457	49.3	−0.1
Liberal National hold		Swing	+0.1	

2015 Queensland state election: Whitsunday
Party	Candidate	Votes	%	±%
Liberal National	Jason Costigan	13,474	41.76	−2.62
Labor	Bronwyn Taha	11,775	36.49	+9.07
Palmer United	Kylee Stanton	4,047	12.54	+12.54
Greens	Tony Fontes	1,972	6.11	+0.23
Independent	Dan Van Blarcom	997	3.09	+3.09
Total formal votes		32,265	97.89	−0.43
Informal votes		695	2.11	+0.43
Turnout		32,960	89.54	−0.85
Two-party-preferred result
Liberal National	Jason Costigan	14,565	50.38	−10.30
Labor	Bronwyn Taha	14,347	49.62	+10.30
Liberal National hold		Swing	−10.30	

2012 Queensland state election: Whitsunday
Party	Candidate	Votes	%	±%
Liberal National	Jason Costigan	12,785	44.38	−0.07
Labor	Jan Jarratt	7,901	27.43	−22.28
Katter's Australian	Amanda Camm	6,424	22.30	+22.30
Greens	Jonathon Dykyj	1,695	5.88	+0.03
Total formal votes		28,805	98.32	+0.10
Informal votes		492	1.68	−0.10
Turnout		29,297	90.39	−0.48
Two-party-preferred result
Liberal National	Jason Costigan	14,778	60.67	+13.91
Labor	Jan Jarratt	9,578	39.33	−13.91
Liberal National gain from Labor		Swing	+13.91	

=== Elections in the 2000s ===
2009 Queensland state election: Whitsunday
Party	Candidate	Votes	%	±%
Labor	Jan Jarratt	13,323	49.7	+3.1
Liberal National	Paul Joice	11,913	44.4	−1.4
Greens	Austin Lund	1,567	5.8	+1.7
Total formal votes		26,803	98.0	
Informal votes		486	2.0	
Turnout		27,289	90.9	
Two-party-preferred result
Labor	Jan Jarratt	13,881	53.2	+2.8
Liberal National	Paul Joice	12,192	46.8	−2.8
Labor hold		Swing	+2.8	

2006 Queensland state election: Whitsunday
Party	Candidate	Votes	%	±%
Labor	Jan Jarratt	11,872	50.6	−1.0
National	Paul Joice	9,933	42.3	+26.2
Greens	Masha Marjanovich	1,161	4.9	−1.6
Independent	Mike Stone	518	2.2	+2.2
Total formal votes		23,484	98.2	+0.2
Informal votes		429	1.8	−0.2
Turnout		23,913	90.3	−0.2
Two-party-preferred result
Labor	Jan Jarratt	12,289	54.4	−10.4
National	Paul Joice	10,319	45.6	+10.4
Labor hold		Swing	−10.4	

2004 Queensland state election: Whitsunday
Party	Candidate	Votes	%	±%
Labor	Jan Jarratt	11,572	51.6	+5.3
Independent	Harry Black	4,721	21.0	+21.0
National	Dan Van Blarcom	3,608	16.1	−8.1
Greens	Lindsay Hains	1,449	6.5	+6.5
One Nation	Henk Schipper	1,088	4.8	−7.6
Total formal votes		22,438	98.0	−0.5
Informal votes		451	2.0	+0.5
Turnout		22,889	90.5	−1.1
Two-candidate-preferred result
Labor	Jan Jarratt	12,548	64.8	+5.2
Independent	Harry Black	6,826	35.2	+35.2
Labor hold		Swing	+5.2	

2001 Queensland state election: Whitsunday
Party	Candidate	Votes	%	±%
Labor	Jan Jarratt	10,026	46.3	+8.4
National	Dave Perkins	5,237	24.2	−6.8
City Country Alliance	Harry Black	2,919	13.5	+13.5
One Nation	David Haselgrove	2,677	12.4	−18.7
Independent	Ken Smyth	799	3.7	+3.7
Total formal votes		21,658	98.5	
Informal votes		334	1.5	
Turnout		21,992	91.6	
Two-party-preferred result
Labor	Jan Jarratt	10,751	59.6	+12.8
National	Dave Perkins	7,294	40.4	+40.4
Labor gain from One Nation		Swing	+12.8	

=== Elections in the 1990s ===
1998 Queensland state election: Whitsunday
Party	Candidate	Votes	%	±%
Labor	Lorraine Bird	8,670	39.7	−4.9
One Nation	Harry Black	6,703	30.7	+30.7
National	Ian Roebuck	6,452	29.6	−15.7
Total formal votes		21,825	98.8	+0.3
Informal votes		256	1.2	−0.3
Turnout		22,081	93.1	+1.8
Two-candidate-preferred result
One Nation	Harry Black	10,607	51.7	+51.7
Labor	Lorraine Bird	9,896	48.3	−1.9
One Nation gain from Labor		Swing	+51.7	

1995 Queensland state election: Whitsunday
Party	Candidate	Votes	%	±%
National	Debbie Perske	9,119	45.3	+7.3
Labor	Lorraine Bird	8,986	44.6	−5.1
Greens	Anni Philp	1,185	5.9	+5.9
Democrats	Robert Farr	460	2.3	+2.3
Independent	Michelle MacNevin	398	2.0	+2.0
Total formal votes		20,148	98.5	+0.7
Informal votes		297	1.5	−0.7
Turnout		20,445	91.3	
Two-party-preferred result
Labor	Lorraine Bird	9,827	50.1	−2.1
National	Debbie Perske	9,775	49.9	+2.1
Labor hold		Swing	−2.1	

1992 Queensland state election: Whitsunday
Party	Candidate	Votes	%	±%
Labor	Lorraine Bird	9,594	49.7	−2.5
National	Rob Dawson	7,332	38.0	+8.2
Liberal	John McCulloch	2,383	12.3	+1.0
Total formal votes		19,309	97.9	
Informal votes		416	2.1	
Turnout		19,725	90.6	
Two-party-preferred result
Labor	Lorraine Bird	9,874	52.2	−3.9
National	Rob Dawson	9,042	47.8	+3.9
Labor hold		Swing	−3.9	

=== Elections in the 1980s ===
1989 Queensland state election: Whitsunday
Party	Candidate	Votes	%	±%
Labor	Lorraine Bird	8,385	44.8	+6.5
National	Robert Dawson	5,510	29.4	−22.5
Liberal	Barry Gomersall	3,548	19.0	+9.2
Independent	John Egan	640	3.4	+3.4
Independent	Geoff Muntz	631	3.4	+3.4
Total formal votes		18,714	96.8	−1.6
Informal votes		623	3.2	+1.6
Turnout		19,337	91.2	+0.6
Two-party-preferred result
Labor	Lorraine Bird	9,363	50.03	+9.03
National	Robert Dawson	9,351	49.97	−9.03
Labor gain from National		Swing	+9.03	

1986 Queensland state election: Whitsunday
Party	Candidate	Votes	%	±%
National	Geoff Muntz	8,219	51.9	−4.6
Labor	Peter Jardine	6,066	38.3	−5.2
Liberal	Robert Rowley	1,550	9.8	+9.8
Total formal votes		15,835	98.4	−0.4
Informal votes		263	1.6	+0.4
Turnout		16,098	90.6	+0.2
Two-party-preferred result
National	Geoff Muntz	9,343	59.0	+1.3
Labor	Peter Jardine	6,492	41.0	−1.3
National hold		Swing	+1.3	

1983 Queensland state election: Whitsunday
Party	Candidate	Votes	%	±%
National	Geoff Muntz	9,163	56.5	+3.0
Labor	Kevin Poschelk	7,063	43.5	−3.0
Total formal votes		16,226	98.8	+0.1
Informal votes		194	1.2	−0.1
Turnout		16,420	90.4	+0.7
National hold		Swing	+3.0	

1980 Queensland state election: Whitsunday
Party	Candidate	Votes	%	±%
National	Geoff Muntz	7,238	53.5	+0.8
Labor	Stanley Yardley	6,284	46.5	+5.0
Total formal votes		13,522	98.7	−0.1
Informal votes		178	1.3	+0.1
Turnout		13,700	89.7	−2.2
National hold		Swing	−2.0	

=== Elections in the 1970s ===
1977 Queensland state election: Whitsunday
Party	Candidate	Votes	%	±%
National	Ron Camm	6,112	52.7	−9.5
Labor	Stanley Yardley	4,808	41.5	+3.7
Democrats	Robert Fordham	668	5.8	+5.8
Total formal votes		11,588	98.8	
Informal votes		139	1.2	
Turnout		11,727	91.9	
Two-party-preferred result
National	Ron Camm	6,433	55.5	−6.7
Labor	Stanley Yardley	5,155	44.5	+6.7
National hold		Swing	−6.7	

1974 Queensland state election: Whitsunday
Party	Candidate	Votes	%	±%
National	Ron Camm	6,828	62.2	+9.5
Labor	Stanley Yardley	4,152	37.8	−4.4
Total formal votes		10,980	98.8	+0.1
Informal votes		137	1.2	−0.1
Turnout		11,117	88.6	−5.1
National hold		Swing	+5.3	

1972 Queensland state election: Whitsunday
Party	Candidate	Votes	%	±%
Country	Ron Camm	5,024	52.7	
Labor	Graeme Bowen	4,029	42.2	
Queensland Labor	Bernard Lewis	485	5.1	
Total formal votes		9,538	98.7	
Informal votes		121	1.3	
Turnout		9,659	93.7	
Two-party-preferred result
Country	Ron Camm	5,427	56.9	+0.3
Labor	Graeme Bowen	4,111	43.1	−0.3
Country hold		Swing	+0.3	

=== Elections in the 1960s ===
1969 Queensland state election: Whitsunday
Party	Candidate	Votes	%	±%
Country	Ron Camm	5,254	55.3	+4.1
Labor	Elwyn Uprichard	3,848	40.5	−2.8
Queensland Labor	Bernard Lewis	401	4.2	−1.3
Total formal votes		9,503	98.4	+0.1
Informal votes		154	1.6	−0.1
Turnout		9,657	92.4	−0.4
Two-party-preferred result
Country	Ron Camm	5,580	58.7	+3.0
Labor	Elwyn Uprichard	3,923	41.3	−3.0
Country hold		Swing	+3.0	

1966 Queensland state election: Whitsunday
Party	Candidate	Votes	%	±%
Country	Ron Camm	4,497	51.2	−5.7
Labor	Bernard Kirwan	3,801	43.3	+0.2
Queensland Labor	Bernard Lewis	485	5.5	+5.5
Total formal votes		8,783	98.3	−0.6
Informal votes		154	1.7	+0.6
Turnout		8,937	92.8	−2.0
Two-party-preferred result
Country	Ron Camm	4,892	55.7	−1.2
Labor	Bernard Kirwan	3,891	44.3	+1.2
Country hold		Swing	−1.2	

1963 Queensland state election: Whitsunday
Party	Candidate	Votes	%	±%
Country	Ron Camm	4,468	56.9	+0.1
Labor	John Barry	3,384	43.1	+8.2
Total formal votes		7,852	98.9	0.0
Informal votes		84	1.1	0.0
Turnout		7,936	94.8	+2.4
Country hold		Swing	N/A	

1960 Queensland state election: Whitsunday
Party	Candidate	Votes	%	±%
Country	Lloyd Roberts	4,341	56.8	
Labor	Stanley Dalton	2,669	34.9	
Queensland Labor	Bernard Lewis	631	8.3	
Total formal votes		7,641	98.9	
Informal votes		83	1.1	
Turnout		7,724	92.4	
Country hold		Swing		

=== Elections in the 1950s ===
1957 Queensland state election: Whitsunday
Party	Candidate	Votes	%	±%
Country	Lloyd Roberts	4,861	55.3	−4.1
Labor	Ralph Staples	2,555	29.1	−11.5
Queensland Labor	Bernard Lewis	1,374	15.6	+15.6
Total formal votes		8,790	98.9	+0.3
Informal votes		94	1.1	−0.3
Turnout		8,884	95.0	+1.8
Country hold		Swing	+6.1	

1956 Queensland state election: Whitsunday
Party	Candidate	Votes	%	±%
Country	Lloyd Roberts	4,962	59.4	+9.9
Labor	George Burns	3,395	40.6	−4.2
Total formal votes		8,357	98.6	−0.6
Informal votes		118	1.4	+0.6
Turnout		8,475	93.2	−0.9
Country hold		Swing	+7.1	

1953 Queensland state election: Whitsunday
Party	Candidate	Votes	%	±%
Country	Lloyd Roberts	3,878	49.5	+4.2
Labor	Hugh MacLennan	3,510	44.8	+8.3
Communist	Jim Henderson	443	5.7	−7.0
Total formal votes		7,831	99.2	+0.2
Informal votes		65	0.8	−0.2
Turnout		7,896	94.1	+2.5
Country hold		Swing	−2.9	

1950 Queensland state election: Whitsunday
Party	Candidate	Votes	%	±%
Country	Lloyd Roberts	3,416	45.3	
Labor	John Casey	2,748	36.5	
Communist	Fred Paterson	957	12.7	
Independent	Michael McColl	411	5.5	
Total formal votes		7,532	99.0	
Informal votes		76	1.0	
Turnout		7,608	91.6	
Country hold		Swing		
