= Candidates of the 2020 Queensland state election =

This article provides information on candidates who stood for the 2020 Queensland state election. The election was held on 31 October 2020.

== By-Elections ==
- On 2 February 2019, Jason Costigan (Whitsunday) resigned and sat as an independent, before forming his own party the North Queensland First.
- On 1 February, Jann Stuckey (Currumbin) resigned. At the by-election on 28 March 2020, Laura Gerber retained the seat for the Liberal National Party.
- On 20 February, Jo-Ann Miller (Bundamba) resigned. At the by-election on 28 March 2020, Lance McCallum retained the seat for the Labor Party.

== Retiring Members ==
=== Labor ===
- Kate Jones MP (Cooper) – Announced 10 September 2020
- Anthony Lynham MP (Stafford) – Announced 10 September 2020
- Coralee O'Rourke MP (Mundingburra) – Announced 5 September 2020

=== Liberal National ===
- Mark McArdle MP (Caloundra) – Announced retirement 27 June 2019
- Ted Sorensen MP (Hervey Bay) – Announced retirement 25 May 2020
- Simone Wilson MP (Pumicestone) – Announced retirement 27 September 2019

== Legislative Assembly ==
There are 597 candidates who nominated for the 2020 state election.

Sitting members are shown in bold text. Successful candidates are highlighted in the relevant colour. Where there is possible confusion, an asterisk (*) is also used.

Electorate	Held by	Labor candidate	LNP candidate	Greens candidate	One Nation candidate	Other candidates
Algester	Labor	**Leeanne Enoch**	Nerissa Aitken	Josie Mira	Wayne Stacey	
Aspley	Labor	**Bart Mellish**	Amanda Cooper	James Hansen	Walter Hardy	Joshua Morrison (UAP); Neil Skilbeck (CLM)
Bancroft	Labor	**Chris Whiting**	Phil Carlson	Ell-Leigh Ackerman	Nik Aai Reddy	Barry Grant (Ind)
Barron River	Labor	**Craig Crawford**	Linda Cooper	Aaron McDonald	Susan Andrews	Adam Rowe (IMOP); Jenny Brown (UAP)
Bonney	LNP	Ash Borg	**Sam O'Connor**	Amin Javanmard	Michael Rix	David Bark (UAP); Leanna Marquet (Ind)
Broadwater	LNP	Maureen Simpson	**David Crisafulli**	April Broadbent	Jesse Schneider	Mara Krischker (UAP); Natalie O'Donnell (IMOP)
Buderim	LNP	Ken Mackenzie	**Brent Mickelberg**	Deborah Moseley	Joyce Hosking	Michael Andrews (Ind); Alison Barry-Jones (Ind); Steve Dickson (Ind); Alina Lee (IMOP); Daniel Philp (UAP)
Bulimba	Labor	**Di Farmer**	Anthony Bishop	Rolf Kuelsen	Doug Conway	Finn Armstrong-Schmakeit (Ind)
Bundaberg	LNP	Tom Smith	**David Batt**	Claire Ogden	Stewart Jones	Shane Smeltz (UAP); Ian Zunker (LCQ)
Bundamba	Labor	**Lance McCallum**	Robert Shearman	Danielle Mutton	Sharon Bell	Angela Lowery (AJP)
Burdekin	LNP	Michael Brunker	**Dale Last**	Jack Smith	Clive Remmer	Sam Cox (KAP); Carolyn Moriarty (NQF); Dominique Thiriet (AJP); Benjamin Wood (UAP)
Burleigh	LNP	Wayne Bartholomew	**Michael Hart**	Rachel Mebberson	Georgie Batty	Carlo Filingari (UAP); Scott Wallace (AJP); Ingrid Weber (LCQ)
Burnett	LNP	Kerri Morgan	**Stephen Bennett**	Liam Johns	Geoffrey Mansell	Elizabeth Case (IMOP); Ric Glass (Ind); Paul Hudson (KAP)
Cairns	Labor	**Michael Healy**	Sam Marino	Daniel Dench	Darrin Griffith	Sarah Baxter (IMOP); David Wright (UAP)
Callide	LNP	Gordon Earnshaw	**Colin Boyce**	Anthony Walsh		Adam Burling (Ind); Loris Doessel (Ind)
Caloundra	LNP	Jason Hunt	Stuart Coward	Raelene Ellis	Luke Poland	Trevor Gray (UAP); Belinda Hart (IMOP); Mathew Hill (Ind); Mike Jessop (Ind)
Capalaba	Labor	**Don Brown**	Bev Walters	Michael Metzen	Neal Gilmore	Paul Branagan (Ind); Peter Callil (CLM); Marilyn Winters (IMOP)
Chatsworth	LNP	Lisa O'Donnell	**Steve Minnikin**	Kathryn Fry	Aaron Clarke	Andrew Crook (UAP); Madonna Guy (IMOP)
Clayfield	LNP	Philip Anthony	**Tim Nicholls**	Andrew Bartlett	Abby Douglas	Rob King (Ind) (Note: The Liberal Democrats endorsed Rob King for Clayfield, but were unregistered, so he appeared as an independent on the ballot paper.); Kathy Maloney (CLM)
Condamine	LNP	Brendon Huybregts	**Pat Weir**	Sean Womersley	Greg Priebe	Nui Harris (UAP)
Cook	Labor	**Cynthia Lui**	Nipper Brown	Deby Ruddell	Brettlyn Neal	Yodie Batzkie (Ind); Stephen Goulmy (UAP); Tanika Parker (KAP); Desmond Tayley (NQF)
Coomera	LNP	Chris Johnson	**Michael Crandon**	Lissy Gavranich	Tabita Wilkinson	Kris Bourbon (Ind); Shé D'Montford (IMOP); Heath Gallagher (UAP); Darryl Prout (AJP)
Cooper	Labor	Jonty Bush	Trent Wiseman	Katinka Winston-Allom	Susan Ventnor	Robert Wiltshire (Ind)
Currumbin	LNP	Kaylee Campradt	**Laura Gerber**	Peter Burgoyne	Glen Wadsworth	Ian Logan (Ind); Anna Palmer (UAP); Richard Stuckey (Ind); Tracy Takacs-Thorne (Ind)
Everton	LNP	Danielle Shankey	**Tim Mander**	Helen Rath	Mal Johnson	Joanne Dissanayake (IMOP); Frank Jordan (LCQ); Simon Russ (UAP); Jabez Wells (Ind)
Ferny Grove	Labor	**Mark Furner**	Chris Lehmann	Joel Colls	Elton Williams	John McCabe (UAP); Susan Pini (IMOP); Mark Scofield (Ind)
Gaven	Labor	**Meaghan Scanlon**	Kirsten Jackson	Sally Spain	Sharon Sewell	Garry Beck (UAP); Reyna Drake (CLM); Suzette Luyken (LCQ)
Gladstone	Labor	**Glenn Butcher**	Ron Harding	Emma Eastaughffe	Kevin Jorgensen	Murray Peterson (Ind)
Glass House	LNP	Brent Hampstead	**Andrew Powell**	Andrew McLean	Graeme Campbell	Laressa McCoy (IMOP); James McDonald (UAP)
Greenslopes	Labor	**Joe Kelly**	Andrew Newbold	Victor Huml	John Booker	Jazzy Melhop (IMOP)
Gregory	LNP	Dave Kerrigan	**Lachlan Millar**	Paul Bambrick	Clint Rothery	Bruce Currie (CLM); Tania Kiara (IMOP); Thomas Turner (UAP)
Gympie	LNP	Geoff Williams	**Tony Perrett**	Lauren Granger-Brown	Michael Blaxland	Nicholas Fairbairn (IMOP); Tim Jerome (Ind); Roland Maertens (Ind); Donna Reardon (Ind)
Hervey Bay	LNP	Adrian Tantari	Steve Coleman	Sonja Gerdsen	Damian Huxham	Amy Byrnes (AJP); Stuart Taylor (Ind)
Hill	KAP	Michael Hodgkins	Nick Cuda	Jennifer Cox		Peter Campion (Ind); Tara Garozzo (IMOP); **Shane Knuth*** (KAP); Chester Tuxford (Ind)
Hinchinbrook	KAP	Paul Jacob	Scott Piper	Carolyn Mewing	Michael Sullivan	**Nick Dametto*** (KAP); Aurelio Mason (UAP); Jen Sackley (Ind)
Inala	Labor	**Annastacia Palaszczuk**	Miljenka Perovic	Peter Murphy	Scott Reid	Terry Jones (Ind); Nigel Quinlan (LCQ); Michael Vidal (CLM)
Ipswich	Labor	**Jennifer Howard**	Scott O'Connell	Pat Walsh	Suzie Holmes	Shelly Morton (LCQ)
Ipswich West	Labor	**Jim Madden**	Chris Green	Raven Wolf	Gary Duffy	Clem Grieger (CLM); Anthony Hopkins (LCQ); Karakan Kochardy (Ind)
Jordan	Labor	**Charis Mullen**	Andrew Mooney	Navdeep Singh	Neil Symes	
Kawana	LNP	Bill Redpath	**Jarrod Bleijie**	Anna Sri	Lyn Moussalli	Pamela Mariko (AJP); Afrikah McGladrigan (UAP)
Keppel	Labor	**Brittany Lauga**	Adrian de Groot	Clancy Mullbrick	Wade Rothery	James Dockery (LCQ); Paula Ganfield (IMOP); Nikki Smeltz (UAP)
Kurwongbah	Labor	**Shane King**	Kerry Petrus	Earl Snijders	Kim Attrill	Heather Dwane (AJP); Thor Prohaska (Ind)
Lockyer	LNP	Janet Butler	**Jim McDonald**	Rebecca Haley	Corey West	Andrew Rockliff (UAP); Jim Savage (Ind)
Logan	Labor	**Linus Power**	Clinton Pattison	Liam Jenkinson	Peter Weber	Sam Iskander (UAP)
Lytton	Labor	**Joan Pease**	Gordon Walters	Ken Austin	Debra Smith	Georgia Phillips (IMOP); Jonathan Spaits (UAP)
Macalister	Labor	**Melissa McMahon**	Judi Van Manen	Kirsty Petersen	Bronwyn Bye	Margaret Keech (Ind); David McClaer (UAP); Ben Musgrave (CLM); Paul Taylor (Ind)
Mackay	Labor	**Julieanne Gilbert**	Chris Bonanno	Imogen Lindenberg	Christine Keys	Shaun Kristic (LCQ); Julie Saunders (IMOP)
Maiwar	Greens	Palani Thevar	Lauren Day	**Michael Berkman**	Boyd Shannon	Michael Johnson (Ind); Jacob Rush (UAP)
Mansfield	Labor	**Corrine McMillan**	Janet Wishart	Rob Walter	Christopher O'Callaghan	Brendan Taylor (LCQ); Maria Todorova (UAP); Jarrod Wirth (Ind)
Maroochydore	LNP	Alison Smith	**Fiona Simpson**	Gabrielle Unverzagt	Rod McCormack	John Connolly (Ind); Janet Creevey (Ind); Tash Poole (AJP); Greg Searle (UAP); Mark Wadeson (Ind)
Maryborough	Labor	**Bruce Saunders**	Denis Chapman	Craig Armstrong	Sharon Lohse	River Body (LCQ); Samantha Packer (IMOP); Alex Sokolov (UAP)
McConnel	Labor	**Grace Grace**	Pinky Singh	Kirsten Lovejoy	Anne Perry	Miranda Bertram (Ind); John Dobinson (Ind); Alan Hamilton (IMOP); Paul Swan (LCQ); Malcolm Wood (UAP)
Mermaid Beach	LNP	Carl Ungerer	**Ray Stevens**	Zai Harris	Stephen James	Hristo Avdjiev (UAP); Rhett Holt (Ind); Tory Jones (Ind); Deb Lynch (LCQ); Nicholas McArthur-Williams (Ind); Suphakan Somsriruen (CLM)
Miller	Labor	**Mark Bailey**	Paul Darwen	Patsy O'Brien	Maria Packer	Edward Carroll (Ind) (Note: The Australian Progressives endorsed Edward Carroll for Miller, but were unregistered, so he appeared as an independent on the ballot paper.); Christian Julius (UAP); Josip Zirdum (LCQ)
Mirani	One Nation	Shane Hamilton	Tracie Newitt	Ben Watkin	**Stephen Andrew**	Jason Borg (NQF); Tepepe Borg (UAP); Nick Byram (CLM)
Moggill	LNP	Roberta Albrecht	**Christian Rowan**	Lawson McCane	Bruce Mitchell	Amy Rayward (CLM)
Morayfield	Labor	**Mark Ryan**	Theresa Craig	Amy Smith	Rodney Hansen	Grant Matthews (IMOP); Jason Snow (Ind)
Mount Ommaney	Labor	**Jess Pugh**	Roger Hooper	Asha Worsteling	Michael Powell	Clive Brazier (LCQ); Ian Eugarde (Ind)
Mudgeeraba	LNP	Maxim Otten-Kamp	**Ros Bates**	Scott Turner	Andrew Liddell	Lindon Cox (AJP); Leith Erikson (Ind); Brandon McMahon (UAP); Gary Pead (Ind); Mark Pytellek (CLM); Bill Sherwood (Ind)
Mulgrave	Labor	**Curtis Pitt**	Gerry Vallianos	Sue Cory	Francis Bartorillo	Attila Feher-Holan (KAP)
Mundingburra	Labor	Les Walker	Glenn Doyle	Jenny Brown	Ian Bowron	Martin Brewster (UAP); Susan Jackson (LCQ); Alannah Tomlinson (KAP)
Murrumba	Labor	**Steven Miles**	Yvonne Barlow	Jason Kennedy	Karen Haddock	Stewart Clark (Ind); Leichelle McMahon (SFF)
Nanango	LNP	Mark Stapleton	**Deb Frecklington**	John Harbison	Tony Scrimshaw	Maggie O'Rance (LCQ)
Nicklin	LNP	Robert Skelton	**Marty Hunt**	Sue Etheridge	Michael Cardinal	Riccardo Bosi (Ind); Allona Lahn (IMOP)
Ninderry	LNP	Melinda Dodds	**Dan Purdie**	Dan Bryar	Frank Weijers	Jay Giles (UAP); Andrea Newland-Blackmore (IMOP)
Noosa	Independent	Mark Denham	James Blevin	Rhonda Prescott	Tracey Bell-Henselin	**Sandy Bolton*** (Ind); Darrell Redford (AJP)
Nudgee	Labor	**Leanne Linard**	Ryan Shaw	Jim Davies	Carrol Halliwell	Dan Pritchard (IMOP)
Oodgeroo	LNP	Irene Henley	**Mark Robinson**	Ian Mazlin	Douglas Chapman	Kirstyn Marriott (IMOP); Claire Richardson (Ind)
Pine Rivers	Labor	**Nikki Boyd**	Kara Thomas	Tara Seiffert-Smith	Christopher Leech	Stephen Austin (UAP); Maureen Brohman (AJP); Alissa Pattrick (IMOP); Bruce Vaschina (Ind)
Pumicestone	LNP	Ali King	Fiona Gaske	Richard Ogden	Ross Konowalenko	Ryan Dryden (LCQ); Steven Newbery (UAP)
Redcliffe	Labor	**Yvette D'Ath**	Kerri-Anne Dooley	Will Simon	Virginia Davy	Robert Blohberger (UAP); Carolyn Kerr (Ind); Ian Philp (Ind)
Redlands	Labor	**Kim Richards**	Henry Pike	Carmen McNaught	Peter Williams	Frank Brady (LCQ); Craig Gunnis (UAP); Michelle Maher (IMOP); Andrew Pope (SFF)
Rockhampton	Labor	**Barry O'Rourke**	Tony Hopkins	Mick Jones	Torin O'Brien	Laura Barnard (LCQ); Paul Crangle (UAP); Dominic Doblo (Ind); Yvette Saxon (IMOP); Christian Shepherd (KAP)
Sandgate	Labor	**Stirling Hinchliffe**	Clark Siemsen	Miree Le Roy	Rodney Miles	Todd Milham (Ind)
Scenic Rim	LNP	Luz Stanton	**Jon Krause**	Pietro Agnoletto	Paul Henselin	Brad Fowler (UAP); Deborah Husbands (IMOP)
South Brisbane	Labor	**Jackie Trad**	Clem Grehan	Amy MacMahon	Rosalie Taxis	John Jiggens (Ind); John Meyer (Ind); Marcus Thorne (UAP)
Southern Downs	LNP	Joel Richters	**James Lister**	Tom Henderson	Rosemary Moulden	Malcolm Richardson (SFF); Debbie Waldron (LCQ)
Southport	LNP	Susie Gallagher	**Rob Molhoek**	Alan Quinn	Raphael Felix	Maria Avdjieva (UAP); Jack Drake (CLM); Brett Lambert (Ind)
Springwood	Labor	**Mick de Brenni**	Kirrily Boulton	Janina Leo	Glen Cookson	Judy Rush (AJP); Ian Sganzerla (CLM); Gueorgui Sokolov (UAP)
Stafford	Labor	Jimmy Sullivan	Ed Sangjitphun	Stephen Bates	Kerrie Dwyer	Anthony Conciatore (Ind); Jeff Hodges (CLM)
Stretton	Labor	**Duncan Pegg**	Peter Zhuang	Andrea Wildin	Alexey Chekhunov	
Surfers Paradise	LNP	Brianna Bailey	**John-Paul Langbroek**	Nelson Quinn	Leanne Schultz	Roger McKay (UAP)
Theodore	LNP	Tracey Bell	**Mark Boothman**	John Woodlock	Anita Holland	Robert Marks (UAP); Gale Oxenford (Ind)
Thuringowa	Labor	**Aaron Harper**	Natalie Marr	Heidi Hardisty	Jeni Alexander	Michael Turner (UAP); Julianne Wood (KAP)
Toohey	Labor	**Peter Russo**	Warren Craze	Claire Garton	Claudia Roel	Nikolas Peterson (LCQ)
Toowoomba North	LNP	Megan O'Hara Sullivan	**Trevor Watts**	Alyce Nelligan	Ron Humphrey	Stella Sokolova (UAP)
Toowoomba South	LNP	Susan Krause	**David Janetzki**	Thomas Coyne	Dylan Kozlowski	Robert Berry (Ind); Allan Turner (UAP)
Townsville	Labor	**Scott Stewart**	John Hathaway	Tom O'Grady	Clive Clarkson	Greg Dowling (UAP); Samara Grumberg (AJP); Clynton Hawks (NQF); Toni McMahon (IMOP); Josh Schwarz (KAP)
Traeger	KAP	James Bambrick	Marnie Smith	Kristian Horvath		**Robbie Katter*** (KAP); Craig Scriven (Ind)
Warrego	LNP	Mark O'Brien	**Ann Leahy**	Joshua Sanderson	Joshua Coyne	Rick Gurnett (KAP); Mark Stone (Ind)
Waterford	Labor	**Shannon Fentiman**	Andrew Caswell	Lachlan Smart	Kim Miller	Lanai Carter (Ind); Ben Olsen (CLM)
Whitsunday	LNP	Angie Kelly	Amanda Camm	Emma Barrett	Deb Lawson	Greg Armstrong (UAP); **Jason Costigan** (NQF); Paul Hilder (LCQ); Ciaron Patterson (KAP)
Woodridge	Labor	**Cameron Dick**	Russell Bauer	Valerie Bennett	Lann Valentine	
