= Electoral results for the district of Hervey Bay =

Queensland, Australia, district election results

This is a list of electoral results for the electoral district of Hervey Bay in Queensland state elections.

== Members for Hervey Bay ==
Member	Party	Term
Bill Nunn	Labor	1992–1998
David Dalgleish	One Nation	1998–1999
David Dalgleish	City Country Alliance	1999–2001
Andrew McNamara	Labor	2001–2009
Ted Sorensen	Liberal National	2009–2020
Adrian Tantari	Labor	2020–2024
David Lee	Liberal National	2024-present

== Election results ==
=== Elections in the 2020s ===
2024 Queensland state election: Hervey Bay
Party	Candidate	Votes	%	±%
Liberal National	David Lee	16,719	43.77	+9.42
Labor	Adrian Tantari	12,331	32.28	−7.22
One Nation	Quinn Hendry	4,916	12.87	+1.73
Legalise Cannabis	Jeff Knipe	2,679	7.01	+7.01
Greens	Pat Walsh	1,553	4.07	+0.94
Total formal votes		38,198	96.34	−0.11
Informal votes		1,450	3.66	+0.11
Turnout		39,648	88.57	−0.07
Two-party-preferred result
Liberal National	David Lee	22,306	58.40	+10.42
Labor	Adrian Tantari	15,892	41.60	−10.42
Liberal National gain from Labor		Swing	+10.42	

2020 Queensland state election: Hervey Bay
Party	Candidate	Votes	%	±%
Labor	Adrian Tantari	13,382	39.50	+10.45
Liberal National	Steve Coleman	11,637	34.35	−3.37
One Nation	Damian Huxham	3,773	11.14	−14.09
Independent	Stuart Taylor	3,001	8.86	+8.86
Greens	Sonja Gerdsen	1,061	3.13	−1.94
Animal Justice	Amy Byrnes	1,024	3.02	+3.02
Total formal votes		33,878	96.45	+0.49
Informal votes		1,247	3.55	−0.49
Turnout		35,125	88.64	+0.15
Two-party-preferred result
Labor	Adrian Tantari	17,625	52.02	+11.12
Liberal National	Steve Coleman	16,253	47.98	−11.12
Labor gain from Liberal National		Swing	+11.12	

=== Elections in the 2010s ===
2017 Queensland state election: Hervey Bay
Party	Candidate	Votes	%	±%
Liberal National	Ted Sorensen	12,049	37.7	−10.1
Labor	Adrian Tantari	9,282	29.1	−2.6
One Nation	Damian Huxham	8,059	25.2	+25.2
Greens	Jenni Cameron	1,619	5.1	+1.4
Independent	Jannean Dean	937	2.9	−0.9
Total formal votes		31,946	96.0	−1.7
Informal votes		1,345	4.0	+1.7
Turnout		33,291	88.5	+2.8
Two-party-preferred result
Liberal National	Ted Sorensen	18,880	59.1	+2.6
Labor	Adrian Tantari	13,066	40.9	−2.6
Liberal National hold		Swing	+2.6	

The results for the 2015 election were:

2015 Queensland state election: Hervey Bay
Party	Candidate	Votes	%	±%
Liberal National	Ted Sorensen	15,316	47.96	−11.27
Labor	Tony Gubbins	10,088	31.59	+10.39
Palmer United	Lynette Pearsall	3,469	10.86	+10.86
	Jannean Dean	1,216	3.81	+3.81
Greens	Kristen Lyons	1,177	3.69	+0.24
Family First	Axel Beard	669	2.09	+2.08
Total formal votes		31,935	97.65	−0.19
Informal votes		768	2.35	+0.19
Turnout		32,703	90.13	−0.92
Two-party-preferred result
Liberal National	Ted Sorensen	16,334	56.62	−15.10
Labor	Tony Gubbins	12,517	43.38	+15.10
Liberal National hold		Swing	−15.10	

2012 Queensland state election: Hervey Bay
Party	Candidate	Votes	%	±%
Liberal National	Ted Sorensen	17,668	59.23	+8.87
Labor	Bernice Allen	6,325	21.20	−17.45
Katter's Australian	Isobel Dale	3,684	12.35	+12.35
Family First	Troy Sullivan	1,124	3.77	+3.77
Greens	Glenn Martin	1,029	3.45	−1.02
Total formal votes		29,830	97.84	−0.36
Informal votes		660	2.16	+0.36
Turnout		30,490	91.05	−0.27
Two-party-preferred result
Liberal National	Ted Sorensen	19,160	71.72	+15.22
Labor	Bernice Allen	7,556	28.28	−15.22
Liberal National hold		Swing	+15.22	

=== Elections in the 2000s ===
2009 Queensland state election: Hervey Bay
Party	Candidate	Votes	%	±%
Liberal National	Ted Sorensen	14,396	50.4	+13.8
Labor	Andrew McNamara	11,047	38.6	−3.0
Independent	Peter Schuback	1,353	4.7	−1.1
Greens	Paul Brown	1,278	4.5	−2.5
DS4SEQ	Jason Powning	510	1.8	+1.8
Total formal votes		28,584	98.0	
Informal votes		524	2.0	
Turnout		29,108	91.3	
Two-party-preferred result
Liberal National	Ted Sorensen	15,251	56.5	+8.6
Labor	Andrew McNamara	11,741	43.5	−8.6
Liberal National gain from Labor		Swing	+8.6	

2006 Queensland state election: Hervey Bay
Party	Candidate	Votes	%	±%
Labor	Andrew McNamara	11,438	41.4	−3.7
National	Jan Rohozinski	10,198	36.9	+1.0
Family First	Elizabeth Benson-Stott	2,472	8.9	+8.9
Greens	Matt Stevenson	1,913	6.9	+1.3
Independent	Peter Schuback	1,607	5.8	+5.8
Total formal votes		27,628	97.5	−0.6
Informal votes		720	2.5	+0.6
Turnout		28,348	92.3	−0.6
Two-party-preferred result
Labor	Andrew McNamara	12,669	51.8	−2.2
National	Jan Rohozinski	11,794	48.2	+2.2
Labor hold		Swing	−2.2	

2004 Queensland state election: Hervey Bay
Party	Candidate	Votes	%	±%
Labor	Andrew McNamara	11,610	45.1	+2.4
National	Bernie Martin	9,257	35.9	+18.7
Independent	David Dalgleish	3,250	12.6	+12.6
Greens	Jacqueline Goodfellow	1,435	5.6	+5.6
Independent	Glen Poulton	219	0.8	+0.8
Total formal votes		25,771	98.1	−0.3
Informal votes		502	1.9	+0.3
Turnout		26,273	92.9	−1.0
Two-party-preferred result
Labor	Andrew McNamara	12,395	54.0	−3.6
National	Bernie Martin	10,575	46.0	+46.0
Labor hold		Swing	−3.6	

2001 Queensland state election: Hervey Bay
Party	Candidate	Votes	%	±%
Labor	Andrew McNamara	9,707	42.7	+5.8
City Country Alliance	David Dalgleish	4,193	18.5	+18.5
One Nation	Wes Robinson	4,186	18.4	−13.3
National	Randal McLellan	3,915	17.2	−11.8
Independent	Wes Donnelly	723	3.2	+3.2
Total formal votes		22,724	98.4	
Informal votes		379	1.6	
Turnout		23,103	93.9	
Two-candidate-preferred result
Labor	Andrew McNamara	10,559	57.6	+11.8
One Nation	Wes Robinson	7,762	42.4	−11.8
Labor gain from One Nation		Swing	+11.8	

=== Elections in the 1990s ===
1998 Queensland state election: Hervey Bay
Party	Candidate	Votes	%	±%
Labor	Bill Nunn	9,213	36.3	−12.1
One Nation	David Dalgleish	8,584	33.8	+33.8
National	Scott McLay	6,968	27.4	−17.6
Democrats	Phil Rodhouse	325	1.3	−5.3
Greens	Bob Borsellino	314	1.2	+1.2
Total formal votes		25,404	99.0	+0.2
Informal votes		266	1.0	−0.2
Turnout		25,670	93.8	+1.0
Two-candidate-preferred result
One Nation	David Dalgleish	13,027	55.3	+55.3
Labor	Bill Nunn	10,540	44.7	−7.2
One Nation gain from Labor		Swing	+55.3	

1995 Queensland state election: Hervey Bay
Party	Candidate	Votes	%	±%
Labor	Bill Nunn	10,905	48.3	−0.6
National	Tony Nioa	10,159	45.0	+5.3
Democrats	Kathy Shilvock	1,493	6.6	+6.6
Total formal votes		22,557	98.8	+0.7
Informal votes		273	1.2	−0.7
Turnout		22,830	92.8	
Two-party-preferred result
Labor	Bill Nunn	11,552	51.9	+1.3
National	Tony Nioa	10,696	48.1	−1.3
Labor hold		Swing	+1.3	

1992 Queensland state election: Hervey Bay
Party	Candidate	Votes	%	±%
Labor	Bill Nunn	9,345	49.0	+4.0
National	Tony Nioa	7,580	39.7	+20.6
Liberal	Doug Wickham	2,159	11.3	−7.6
Total formal votes		19,084	98.1	
Informal votes		371	1.9	
Turnout		19,455	92.5	
Two-party-preferred result
Labor	Bill Nunn	9,519	50.6	−0.3
National	Tony Nioa	9,289	49.4	+0.3
Labor hold		Swing	−0.3	
