= Andrew McNamara =

Andrew McNamara may refer to:

- Andrew McNamara (politician) (born 1959), Australian politician
- Andrew McNamara (jockey), Irish jockey
- Andrew T. McNamara (1905–2002), United States Army general
- Andy McNamara (born 1969), American sportscaster
