= 2020 Liberal National Party of Queensland leadership election =

2020 Liberal National Party leadership election
- 12 November 2020
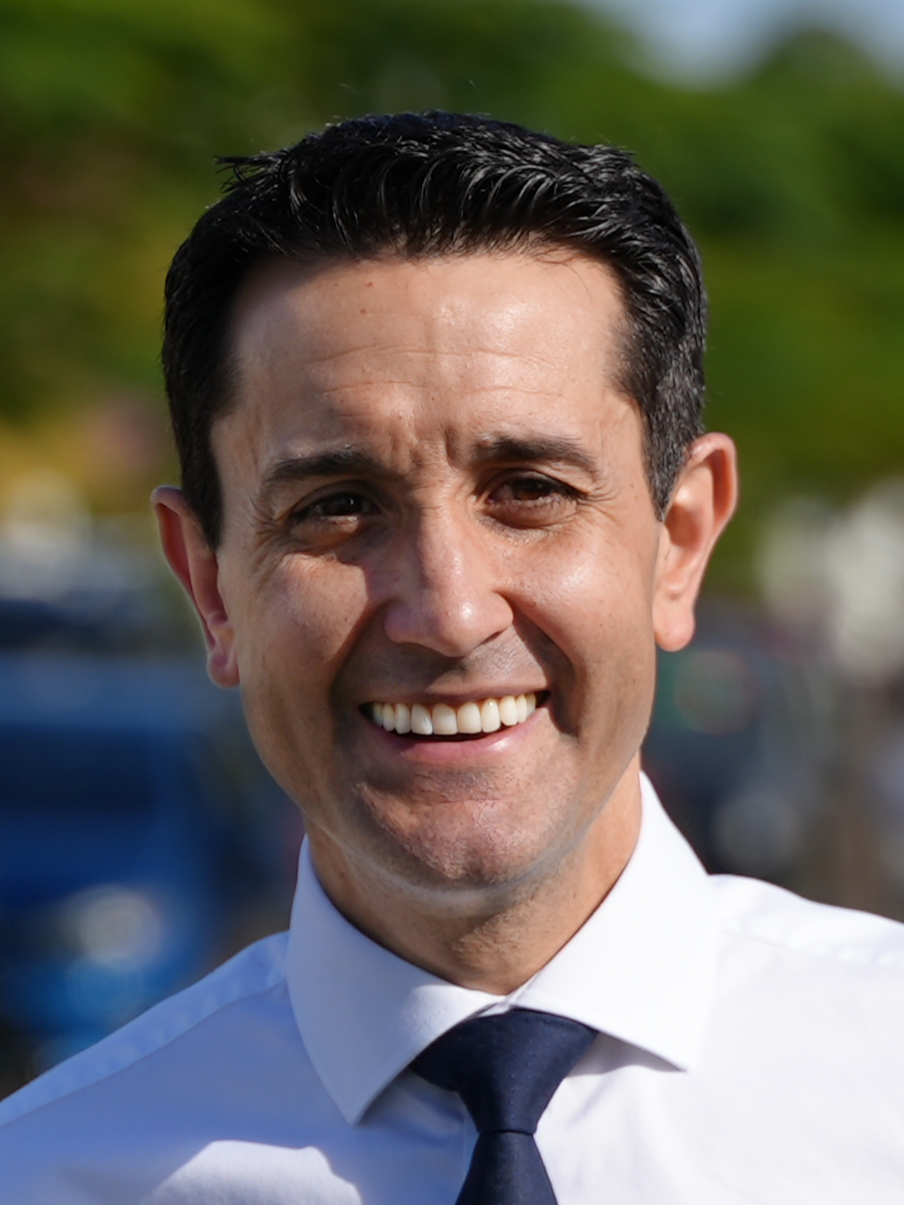
Candidate	David Crisafulli
Result	Unopposed
Seat	Broadwater
Faction	Centre Right
Leader before election
Deb Frecklington
Elected Leader
David Crisafulli

A leadership election was held on 12 November 2020, to determine the successor of Deb Frecklington as leader of the Liberal National Party of Queensland and Leader of the Opposition. Frecklington announced her resignation after the LNP's defeat at the 2020 Queensland State Election. Member for Broadwater David Crisafulli was elected unopposed.

== See also ==
- 2020 Queensland state election
- 2019 Australian federal election
