= David Lee (Australian politician) =

Australian politician

David Lee MP

Member of the Queensland Legislative Assembly for Hervey Bay
- Incumbent
- Assumed office 26 October 2024
- Preceded by: Adrian Tantari

Personal details
- Born: Adelaide, South Australia
- Party: Liberal National
- Profession: Former Australian Army medic, registered nurse, chief executive officer, solicitor and local government councillor.

David Lee is an Australian politician. He was elected member of the Legislative Assembly of Queensland for Hervey Bay in the 2024 Queensland state election.

Lee is a charity worker in Hervey Bay.

Parliament of Queensland
Preceded by Adrian Tantari	Member for Hervey Bay; 2024–present	Incumbent
