= Ron Camm =

Australian politician

The Honourable Ron Camm

Deputy Leader of the Queensland National Party
- In office 2 August 1968 – 17 July 1980
- Leader: Joh Bjelke-Petersen
- Preceded by: Joh Bjelke-Petersen
- Succeeded by: Vic Sullivan

Member of the Queensland Legislative Assembly for Whitsunday
- In office 1 July 1961 – 17 July 1980
- Preceded by: Lloyd Roberts
- Succeeded by: Geoff Muntz

Personal details
- Born: Ronald Ernest Camm; 22 July 1914 Emerald, Queensland, Australia
- Died: 15 March 1988 (aged 73) Auchenflower, Queensland, Australia
- Party: Country Party/National Party
- Spouse: Florence Alice Leech (m.1939 d.2005)
- Relations: Amanda Camm, great-niece
- Occupation: Grazier

Ronald Ernest Camm (22 July 1914 – 15 March 1988) was an Australian politician, a member of the Queensland Legislative Assembly.

== Biography ==
Camm was born in Emerald, Queensland, the son of Jonathan Robert Camm and his wife Tassie (née Johnson). He was educated in Rockhampton and Mackay and began his working life for OE Neale in Mackay. After a time working as a labourer in Bloomsbury he became a canefarmer at Mount Julia.

On 17 June 1939 he married Florence Alice Leech (died 2005) and together had a son and two daughters. Camm died at Auchenflower in March 1988.

== Public career ==
Camm, representing the Country Party, won the 1961 by-election for the Queensland state seat of Whitsunday following the death of the sitting member, Lloyd Roberts. In 1974, the Country Party changed its name to the National Party. He went on to represent the electorate until his retirement from politics in 1980.

During his time in politics, he held the following ministerial portfolios:

- Minister for Mines and Main Roads 1965–1968 and 1969–1974
- Minister for Mines, Main Roads and Electricity 1968–1969
- Minister for Mines and Energy and Minister Assisting the Premier on Matters Concerning Northern Development 1974–1977
- Minister for Mines, Energy and Police 1977–1980

He was the Deputy Leader of the Parliamentary National Party from 1968 until 1980.

Parliament of Queensland
Preceded by Lloyd Roberts	Member for Whitsunday; 1961–1980	Succeeded by Geoff Muntz
