= Geoff Muntz =

Australian politician (1938–2024)

Member of the Queensland Legislative Assembly for Whitsunday
- In office 29 November 1980 – 2 December 1989
- Preceded by: Ron Camm
- Succeeded by: Lorraine Bird

Personal details
- Born: Geoffrey Hugh Muntz; 11 July 1938 Beenleigh, Queensland, Australia
- Died: 8 August 2024 (aged 86)
- Party: Independent
- Other political affiliations: National Party
- Spouse: Jean Saverin (m.1960)
- Occupation: Real estate agent, District manager, State Agricultural Bank

Geoffrey Hugh Muntz (11 July 1938 – 8 August 2024) was an Australian politician.

He was born in Beenleigh to Hugh Dunstan Muntz and Ethel Rebecca, née Doherty. He attended Pimpama State School and Queensland Agricultural High School before becoming a rural and urban valuer. He married Jean Saverin on 27 February 1960; they had four children. In 1961 he was appointed an inspector with the State Lands Department, and in 1964 became district manager of the State Agricultural Bank. A member of the National Party, he was elected to the Queensland Legislative Assembly in 1980 as the member for Whitsunday. In 1983 he was promoted to the front bench as Minister for Welfare Services, moving to Corrective Services, Administration Services and Valuation in 1986. In December of that year he was assigned to Tourism, National Parks and Sport, and then in 1987 to Environment, Conservation and Tourism. He stepped down from the ministry in September 1989 and on 9 November 1989 resigned from the National Party. He ran as an independent candidate at the 1989 state election, but was defeated. On 22 Apr 1991, Muntz was found guilty of misappropriation to the value of $4,891.83 of ministerial expense funds and sentenced to 12 months jail. Muntz died on 8 August 2024, at the age of 86.

Parliament of Queensland
Preceded by Ron Camm	Member for Whitsunday; 1980–1989	Succeeded by Lorraine Bird
