= Ted Sorensen (politician) =

Australian politician (born 1953)

Ted Sorensen MP

Member of the Queensland Legislative Assembly for Hervey Bay
- In office 21 March 2009 – 6 October 2020
- Preceded by: Andrew McNamara
- Succeeded by: Adrian Tantari

Personal details
- Born: Edward John Sorensen; 20 January 1953 (age 73) Hervey Bay, Queensland, Australia
- Party: Liberal National Party of Queensland
- Spouse: Jenny Sorensen
- Children: Two
- Occupation: Grazier

Edward John Sorensen (born 20 January 1953) is an Australian politician. He was a Liberal National Party member of the Legislative Assembly of Queensland from 2009 to 2020.

Sorensen attended public schools in Hervey Bay, and was elected to Hervey Bay City Council in 1994. In 2000 he became mayor, serving in that position until 2008, when he was selected as the Liberal National Party candidate for Hervey Bay for the 2009 state election. He was successful, achieving a large swing to defeat sitting Labor member and Bligh government Minister Andrew McNamara.

Much of Sorensen's time in parliament was in opposition but during the premiership of Campbell Newman he was Deputy Government Whip from 2012 to 2015.

Sorensen was re-elected in 2012, 2015 and 2017. He announced in May 2020 that he would retire from state politics at the 2020 Queensland state election in October.

Parliament of Queensland
| Preceded by Andrew McNamara | Member for Hervey Bay; 2009–2020 | Succeeded by Adrian Tantari |
