= Andrew McNamara (politician) =

Australian politician (born 1959)

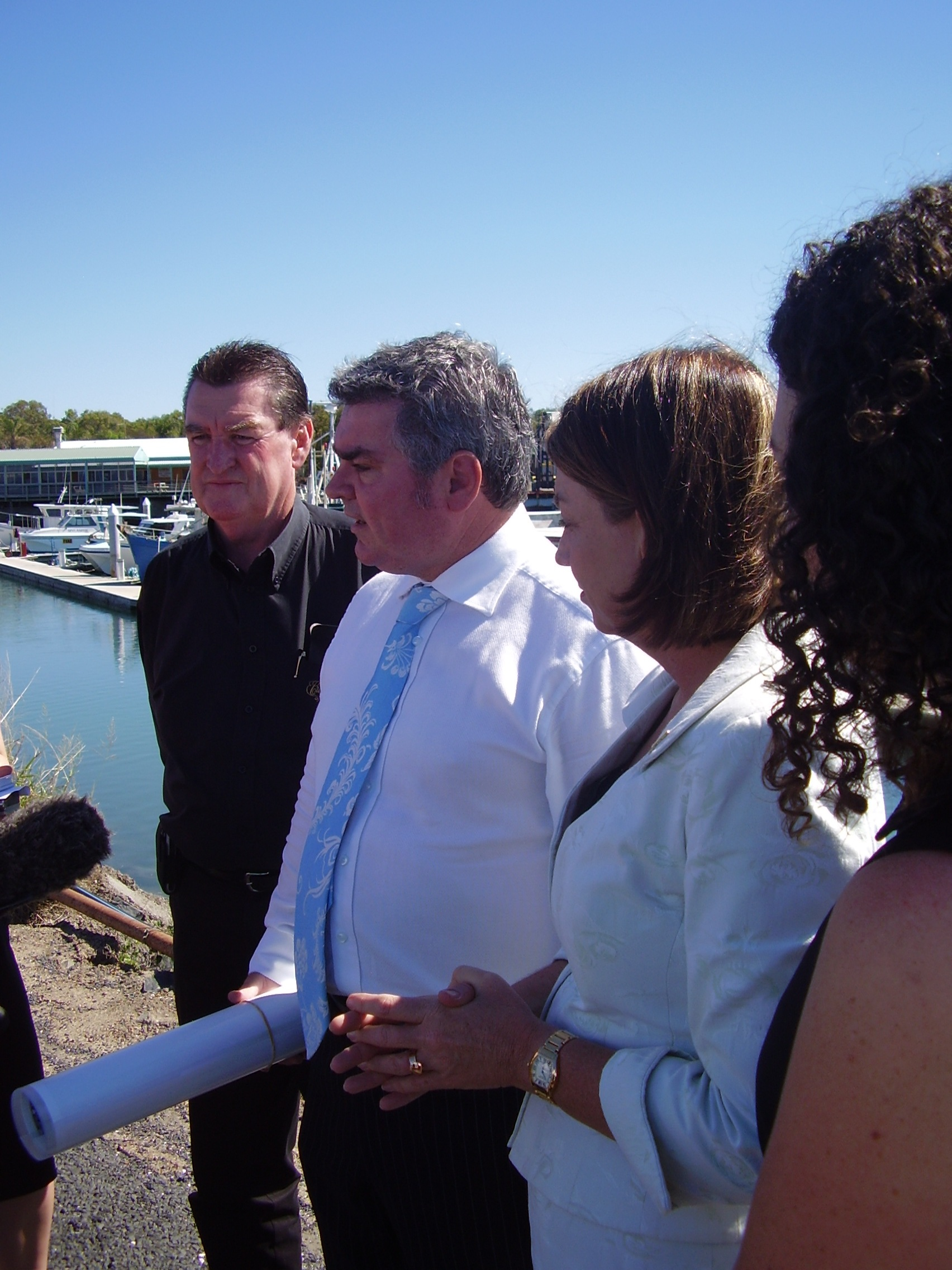
- Andrew McNamara (centre), Hervey Bay Deputy Mayor Mick Kruger (left) and Queensland Deputy Premier Anna Bligh (right) at the Urangan Boat Harbour in May 2007

Member of the Queensland Legislative Assembly for Hervey Bay
- In office 17 February 2001 – 20 March 2009
- Preceded by: David Dalgleish
- Succeeded by: Ted Sorensen

Personal details
- Born: Andrew Ian McNamara; 19 August 1959 (age 67) Brisbane, Queensland, Australia
- Party: Labor
- Education: University of Queensland
- Occupation: Solicitor

Andrew Ian McNamara (born 19 August 1959) was an Australian politician. He was a Labor member of the Legislative Assembly of Queensland from 2001 to 2009, representing the district of Hervey Bay. He served as Minister for Sustainability, Climate Change and Innovation from 2007 to 2009, under the premiership of Anna Bligh. Currently, Mr McNamara was the CEO of the Chiropractors' Association of Australia.

== Peak oil ==
In February 2005, McNamara came to national prominence as the first mainstream Australian politician to speak out on the issue of Peak Oil.

McNamara was the Chair of the Queensland Government's Oil Vulnerability Taskforce. The Taskforce report, "Queensland's Vulnerability to Rising Oil Prices," also known as the McNamara Report was commissioned in 2005 and is the first of its kind to be commissioned by any government in the world. McNamara is also the Foundation Patron of the Australian Association for the Study of Peak Oil (ASPO).

== Climate change ==
Andrew McNamara was a member of Australia's delegation to the Bali Climate Change Conference in December 2007. McNamara has also established a Climate Change Council with a number of prominent environmentalists and business leaders including Tim Flannery and Ian Lowe.

== Anti-whaling ==
Andrew McNamara has been a strong opponent of whaling, particularly Japanese whaling in Australian waters.

== Hervey Bay ==
Andrew McNamara represented the seat of Hervey Bay. Hervey Bay is one of the fastest-growing areas in Australia. The area's principal industry is tourism, in particular whale watching.

Seeking a fourth term, McNamara was defeated in the 2009 election by former Hervey Bay Mayor Ted Sorensen.

== Significant speeches ==
- First Speech in the Queensland Parliament, 3 April 2001
- Speech in Queensland Parliament on Peak Oil, 22 February 2005
- Speech in Queensland Parliament against Whaling, 6 February 2007
- Speech in Queensland Parliament against Whaling, 22 May 2007
- Speech in Queensland Parliament on Clean Coal Technology, 7 June 2007

Parliament of Queensland
Preceded by David Dalgleish	Member for Hervey Bay; 2001–2009	Succeeded by Ted Sorensen
