= North Queensland First =

- Abbreviation: NQF; NQ First
- Leader: Jason Costigan
- President: Dick Filewood
- Secretary: Ange Nixon
- Founder: Jason Costigan
- Founded: September 2019; 5 years ago
- Registered: 31 October 2019; 5 years ago
- Dissolved: 2021
- Split from: Liberal National Party
- Headquarters: Whitsundays, Queensland
- Ideology: Regionalism; North Queensland statehood Conservatism
- Political position: Centre-right
- Colours: Navy blue and yellow
- Queensland Parliament: 1 / 93 (2019−2020)

Website
- https://www.nqfirst.com.au/

North Queensland First (NQ First) was an Australian political party founded and based in the state of Queensland by then-MP Jason Costigan. The party was created in late 2019 after Costigan, who was serving as the member for Whitsunday in the Legislative Assembly of Queensland, was expelled from the Liberal National Party.

== History ==
After being expelled by the Liberal National Party, Independent MP for Whitsunday, Jason Costigan created the North Queensland First Party.

In response to the foundation of the new political party, Katter's Australian Party leader Robbie Katter said: "We are doers, we have left the others for dead in terms of what we have done. We can all talk a big game but it is about who will have a seat in Parliament."

As of 2023, the party's website is a dead link, although it previously redirected to the webpage of the Democratic Party of Queensland, another minor state-level party.

== Objective ==
In the published constitution of the party, it states three objectives of the party:

(a) to promote and deliver Self-Government and Statehood for North Queensland;
(b) the election of MPs to the Queensland Parliament;
(c) to give specific voice in the Queensland Parliament to the desires and expectations of the people of North Queensland.

The party's website stated that "North Queensland First is a conservative, pro-North Queensland political party and believes that Queensland and Australia was founded on traditional Christian values, notwithstanding our respect for people from non-Christian backgrounds."

== Electoral results ==
Legislative Assembly
Election year	No. of overall votes	% of overall vote	seats won	+/–	Notes
2020	5,616	0.20 (10th)	0 / 93	▼1	Extra-parliamentary
