= Adrian Tantari =

Australian politician

Member of the Queensland Legislative Assembly for Hervey Bay
- In office 31 October 2020 – 26 October 2024
- Preceded by: Ted Sorensen
- Succeeded by: David Lee

Personal details
- Born: 15 March 1961 (age 65) Altona, Victoria, Australia
- Party: Labor

Adrian Tantari (born 15 March 1961) is an Australian former politician. He was elected to the Queensland Legislative Assembly as the Labor member for Hervey Bay at the 2020 Queensland state election and held the seat for one term until his defeat at the 2024 state election. Despite being considered a safe seat for the Liberal National Party in 2020, he achieved an eleven-point swing and won the seat with a majority of two percent, the first non-LNP victory in Hervey Bay since 2006.

== Biography ==
Tantari was born in 1961, in Altona, Victoria, to an Italian family. His father immigrated to Australia after World War Two at the age of 17. Tantari is divorced and has 3 adult children. Prior to the 2020 election, Tantari has lived on the Fraser Coast for over 23 years and was the Labor candidate in the 2017 Queensland state election. Locally, he is a member of the Hervey Bay Historical Society, the Hervey Bay Boat Club, and the Fraser Coast Bicycle Users Group.

== Political career ==
=== 2017 state election ===
In 2017, Tantari was the Labor Party candidate for Hervey Bay. He received 29.1% of the primary vote, behind the Liberal National Party candidate, Ted Sorensen, who received 37.7% of the primary vote. After preferences, Tantari received 40.9% of the vote to Sorensen's 59.1%.

Tantari's 2017 campaign emphasised growing the region's educational institutions and gaining better infrastructure for the growing city.

=== 2020 state election ===
In his 2020 campaign, Tantari again emphasised growing the region's educational institutions and gaining better infrastructure for the growing city. Tantari also called for the re-establishment of the Ministerial Regional Community Forums to help bolster the economic significance of the region.

Prior to the 2020 Queensland state election, the seat of Hervey Bay was treated as a "safe" seat for the Liberal Nationals. In the final result, Tantari gained over an 11% swing, securing the seat for Labor.

Parliament of Queensland
Preceded by Ted Sorensen	Member for Hervey Bay; 2020–2024	Succeeded by David Lee
