= Electoral district of Whitsunday =

State electoral district of Queensland, Australia

Whitsunday Queensland—Legislative Assembly
- Electoral map of Whitsunday 2017
- State: Queensland
- MP: Amanda Camm
- Party: Liberal National
- Namesake: Whitsunday Island
- Electors: 34,824 (2020)
- Area: 4,898 km^{2} (1,891.1 sq mi)
- Demographic: Rural
- Coordinates: 20°35′S 149°2′E
Electorates around Whitsunday:
Burdekin	Coral Sea	Coral Sea
Burdekin	Whitsunday	Coral Sea
Mirani	Mirani	Mackay

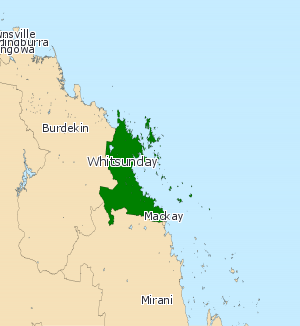
Electoral map of Whitsunday in 2008

Whitsunday is an electoral district represented in the Legislative Assembly of the Australian state of Queensland. It is on the Coral Sea coast and extends from the northern suburbs of Mackay to Bowen and Proserpine as well as east to the Whitsunday Islands.

Since 2020 the member for Whitsunday has been Amanda Camm of the Liberal National Party.

== Members for Whitsunday ==
Member	Party affiliation	Period
Lloyd Roberts	Country Party	1950–1961
Ron Camm	Country	1961–1974
Ron Camm	National	1974–1980
Geoff Muntz	National	1980–1989
Geoff Muntz	Independent	1989
Lorraine Bird	Labor	1989–1998
Harry Black	One Nation	1998–1999
Harry Black	City Country Alliance	1999–2001
Jan Jarratt	Labor	2001–2012
Jason Costigan	Liberal National	2012–2019
Jason Costigan	Independent	2019
Jason Costigan	North Queensland First	2019–2020
Amanda Camm	Liberal National	2020–present

== Election results ==
2024 Queensland state election: Whitsunday
Party	Candidate	Votes	%	±%
Liberal National	Amanda Camm	16,941	52.75	+19.95
Labor	Bauke Hovinga	7,264	22.62	−9.98
One Nation	Julie Hall	5,380	16.75	+7.35
Greens	Elena Quirk	1,570	4.89	+0.99
Family First	Peter Atchison	962	2.99	+2.99
Total formal votes		32,117	95.8	
Informal votes		1,420	4.2	
Turnout		33,537	86.85	
Two-party-preferred result
Liberal National	Amanda Camm	21,992	68.47	+15.17
Labor	Bauke Hovinga	10,125	31.47	−15.17
Liberal National hold		Swing	+15.17	
