= Lorraine Bird =

Australian politician

Member of the Queensland Legislative Assembly for Whitsunday
- In office 2 December 1989 – 13 June 1998
- Preceded by: Geoff Muntz
- Succeeded by: Harry Black

Personal details
- Born: 12 February 1942 (age 84) Charters Towers, Queensland
- Died: 17 November 2025 Andergrove, Queensland
- Party: Labor
- Occupation: Antique dealer, Counsellor

Lorraine Rita Bird (12 February 1942 – 17 November 2025) was an Australian politician.

Bird worked as an antiques dealer and community development worker, and joined the Labor Party in 1979. In 1985 she was elected to Pioneer Shire Council (serving until 1991), and in 1989 was elected to the Queensland Legislative Assembly as the Labor member for Whitsunday. In February 1996 she was appointed Shadow Minister for Tourism, and she was shuffled to Shadow Minister for Public Works and Administrative Services in December 1996 before leaving the front bench in August 1997. In 1998 she was defeated by a One Nation candidate.

Parliament of Queensland
| Preceded by Geoff Muntz | Member for Whitsunday; 1989–1998 | Succeeded by Harry Black |
