= Harry Black (politician) =

Australian politician

Member of the Queensland Legislative Assembly for Whitsunday
- In office 13 June 1998 – 17 February 2001
- Preceded by: Lorraine Bird
- Succeeded by: Jan Jarratt

Personal details
- Born: Alfred Harold Black; 6 April 1947 (age 79) Brisbane, Queensland, Australia
- Party: Pauline Hanson's One Nation (1997–1999); City Country Alliance (1999–2003)
- Occupation: Small business operator (Self–employed)
- Profession: Businessman politician

Alfred Harold "Harry" Black (born 6 April 1947) is a former Australian politician. Born in Brisbane, he was a small business operator before entering politics. In 1998, he was elected to the Legislative Assembly of Queensland as the member for Whitsunday, representing Pauline Hanson's One Nation. He remained in the party until December 1999, when the remaining state MPs formed the City Country Alliance under Bill Feldman's leadership. Black was the Alliance's spokesman for Employment, Training and Industrial Relations, Mines and Energy, Tourism, Sport and Racing. He was defeated in 2001 by Labor's Jan Jarratt.

Parliament of Queensland
Preceded by Lorraine Bird	Member for Whitsunday; 1998–2001	Succeeded by Jan Jarratt
