= Andy McNamara =

American sportscaster (born 1969)

Andrew Michael McNamara (born August 31, 1969, in Camden, New Jersey) is an American sportscaster, most known for his work as a soccer play-by-play announcer. He was the radio voice of the Portland Timbers of Major League Soccer from 2001 to 2011, which also spanned the club's time as a member of the USL First Division. Additionally, he served as on-air talent for Fox Sports Net (FSN) and Root Sports (ROOT) on Timbers' television broadcasts from 2008-2011. He was nominated for, but did not win, the 2005 National Sportscaster of the Year award.

He worked as an international television commentator for the 2001 FIFA U-17 World Championship in Trinidad and Tobago and has covered the CONCACAF Gold Cup and FIFA World Cup qualification matches involving the United States Men's National Soccer Team. McNamara began his professional career as the radio voice of the Portland Pride (Continental Indoor Soccer League) in 1995. In addition to soccer, he has play-by-play experience in college baseball, college basketball, college football, college hockey and called games in the American Basketball League.
