= Amanda Camm =

Australian politician

The Honourable Amanda Camm MP

Minister for Families, Seniors and Disabilities of Queensland
- In office 1 November 2024 – 24 October 2026
- Premier: David Crisafulli
- Preceded by: Charis Mullen (as Minister for Seniors and Disability Services)
- Succeeded by: Amanda Stoker

Minister for Child Safety of Queensland
- In office 1 November 2024 – 24 October 2026
- Premier: David Crisafulli
- Preceded by: Charis Mullen
- Succeeded by: Amanda Stoker

Minister for the Prevention of Domestic and Family Violence of Queensland
- In office 1 November 2024 – 24 October 2026
- Premier: David Crisafulli
- Preceded by: Yvette D'Ath
- Succeeded by: Amanda Stoker

Member of the Queensland Parliament for Whitsunday
- Incumbent
- Assumed office 31 October 2020
- Preceded by: Jason Costigan

Personal details
- Born: Amanda Jane Camm; 18 April 1979 (age 47)
- Party: Liberal National (since 2016)
- Other political affiliations: Katter's Australian (2012–2016)
- Relations: Ron Camm (great-uncle)

Amanda Jane Camm (born 18 April 1979) is an Australian politician. She is a member of the Parliament of Queensland representing the Liberal Nationals.

She first stood for the seat of Whitsunday as a member of Katter's Australian Party in the 2012 Queensland State election.

Camm was elected deputy mayor of the Mackay Regional Council in April 2016. She was a candidate for the Australian Senate in May 2019 but, being placed fifth on the LNP ticket, was not elected.

At the 2020 Queensland state election Camm defeated Jason Costigan in the seat of Whitsunday.

Her great-uncle was Ron Camm, a grazier who held the seat of Whitsunday for the National Country Party from 1961 to 1980.

== Extramarital affair with Tim Mander ==
In May 2026, The Australian reported that Queensland premier David Crisafulli was told that Camm and Olympic Minister Tim Mander had participated in a two year long extramarital affair, before Mander left his wife Gayle. Their relationship was formally disclosed to the public in July 2025, shortly after Crisafulli received a warning. Political reporters raised questions regarding Mander's choice to change the location of a 2032 Summer Olympics event to Camm's electorate. Crisafulli's chief of staff suggested that the alleged breaches of the Ministerial Code of Conduct were not "clear enough" to proceed with an investigation.

Parliament of Queensland
Preceded by Jason Costigan	Member for Whitsunday; 2020–present	Incumbent
