= Lloyd Roberts (politician) =

Australian politician

Member of the Queensland Legislative Assembly for Whitsunday
- In office 29 April 1950 – 11 April 1961
- Preceded by: New seat
- Succeeded by: Ron Camm

Personal details
- Born: Lloyd Henry Scurfield Roberts; 8 June 1907 Toowoomba, Queensland, Australia
- Died: 11 April 1961 (aged 53) Brisbane, Queensland, Australia
- Party: Country Party
- Spouse: Rosina Violet Price (m.1929 d.1967)
- Occupation: Clerk, Insurance inspector, Car salesman, Soldier

Lloyd Henry Scurfield Roberts (8 June 1907 – 11 March 1961) was an Australian politician.

== Politics ==
Roberts was the Country Party member for Whitsunday in the Legislative Assembly of Queensland from 1950 until his death in 1961.

== Later life ==
Roberts died on 11 April 1961 in Brisbane.

Parliament of Queensland
New seat	Member for Whitsunday; 1950–1961	Succeeded by Ron Camm
