= Jason Costigan =

Australian politician

Leader of North Queensland First
- Incumbent
- Assumed office 18 November 2019
- President: Richard Filewood
- Preceded by: Position established

Shadow Assistant Minister for North Queensland
- In office 10 May 2016 – 14 December 2017
- Leader: Tim Nicholls; Deb Frecklington
- Preceded by: Andrew Cripps
- Succeeded by: Dale Last

Member of the Queensland Legislative Assembly for Whitsunday
- In office 24 March 2012 – 6 October 2020
- Preceded by: Jan Jarratt
- Succeeded by: Amanda Camm

Personal details
- Born: 13 June 1971 (age 55) Mackay, Queensland, Australia
- Party: North Queensland First (since 2019)
- Other political affiliations: Independent (2019); Liberal National (until 2019)
- Education: St Mary’s Catholic Primary School; Mackay State High School
- Occupation: Rugby league commentator

Jason Noel Costigan (born 13 June 1971) is an Australian radio commentator and former politician who was a Member of Parliament in the Queensland Legislative Assembly and leader of the North Queensland First party. Costigan was previously an independent politician and rugby league commentator. He was a member of the Liberal National Party (LNP) until being expelled from the party in February 2019. He had been a member of the Legislative Assembly of Queensland for Whitsunday until 2020, first being elected in 2012 after defeating Jan Jarratt at that year's state election.

== Broadcasting career ==
Costigan's broadcasting career began in northern Queensland in the late 1980s and he began calling rugby league in 1987 for regional television in Queensland. He later joined New Zealand's SKY Network Television as their main NRL commentator and served in the role until the end of the 2010 season.

Costigan has also worked as a media manager for the Canterbury-Bankstown Bulldogs and Bradford Bulls and was an advisor to the Central Queensland NRL bid. He left his role as project co-ordinator for the NRL bid team to spend more time with his family.

== Political career ==
Costigan worked as an adviser to the Sports Minister in the Howard Government and a media adviser to Senator Ian MacDonald.

He was a member of the Legislative Assembly of Queensland for Whitsunday, having defeated Jan Jarratt at the 2012 state election.

Costigan was suspended from the LNP in January 2019 after a complaint alleged that he harassed a woman. He denied the charges, but was formally expelled from the party by the executive on 1 February 2019. In April 2020, the woman withdrew her complaint and offered an "unreserved apology" to Costigan.

In September 2019, Costigan founded the North Queensland First party which aims for Northern Queensland statehood.

He contested his Whitsunday seat in the 2020 Queensland state election as the sitting candidate but lost to Amanda Camm. He received 9.37% of the first preference votes.

Parliament of Queensland
Preceded by Jan Jarratt	Member for Whitsunday; 2012–2020	Succeeded by Amanda Camm
