= Jan Jarratt =

Australian politician

Minister for Tourism, Manufacturing and Small Business of Queensland
- In office 21 February 2011 – 26 March 2012
- Premier: Anna Bligh
- Succeeded by: Jann Stuckey

Member of the Queensland Parliament for Whitsunday
- In office 17 February 2001 – 24 March 2012
- Preceded by: Harry Black
- Succeeded by: Jason Costigan

Personal details
- Born: 22 October 1958 (age 67) Miles, Queensland, Australia
- Party: Labor
- Spouse: Hilar "Ziggy" Ziegler
- Occupation: Teacher

Janice Heather Jarratt (born 22 October 1958) is an Australian politician. She was a teacher specialising in children with learning difficulties before entering parliament. A member of the Labor Party, she was elected to the Legislative Assembly of Queensland for the seat of Whitsunday in 2001. She was appointed Parliamentary Secretary to the Minister for Primary Industries and Fisheries on 13 September 2006 by Premier Peter Beattie. She served on the front bench for all of Anna Bligh's term. She was Parliamentary Secretary to the Minister for Tourism, Regional Development and Industry from 2007 to 2009, when she became Parliamentary Secretary to the Minister for Employment. In February 2011, she was promoted to the ministry as Minister for Tourism, Manufacturing and Small Business. In March 2012, Labor was swept out of power at an election that also cost Jarratt her seat.

Parliament of Queensland
Preceded by Harry Black	Member for Whitsunday; 2001–2012	Succeeded by Jason Costigan
