= 2020 Queensland state election =

- 31 October 2020

All 93 seats in the Legislative Assembly of Queensland 47 seats needed for a majority
- Opinion polls
- Registered: 3,377,476 (▲4.6%)
- Turnout: 2,969,347 (87.92%) (▲0.4 pp)
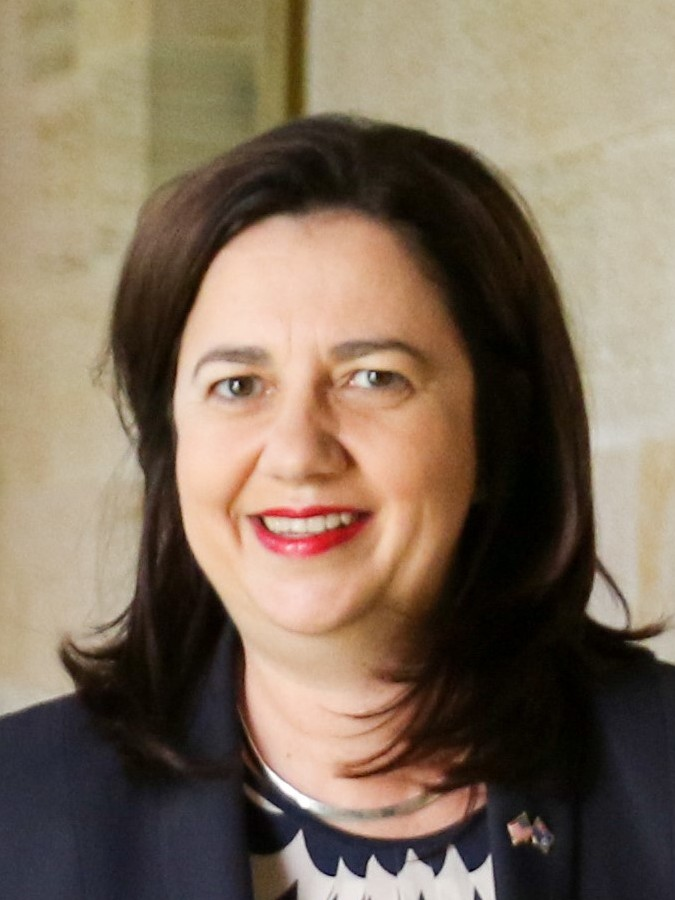

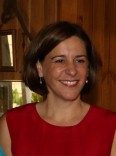

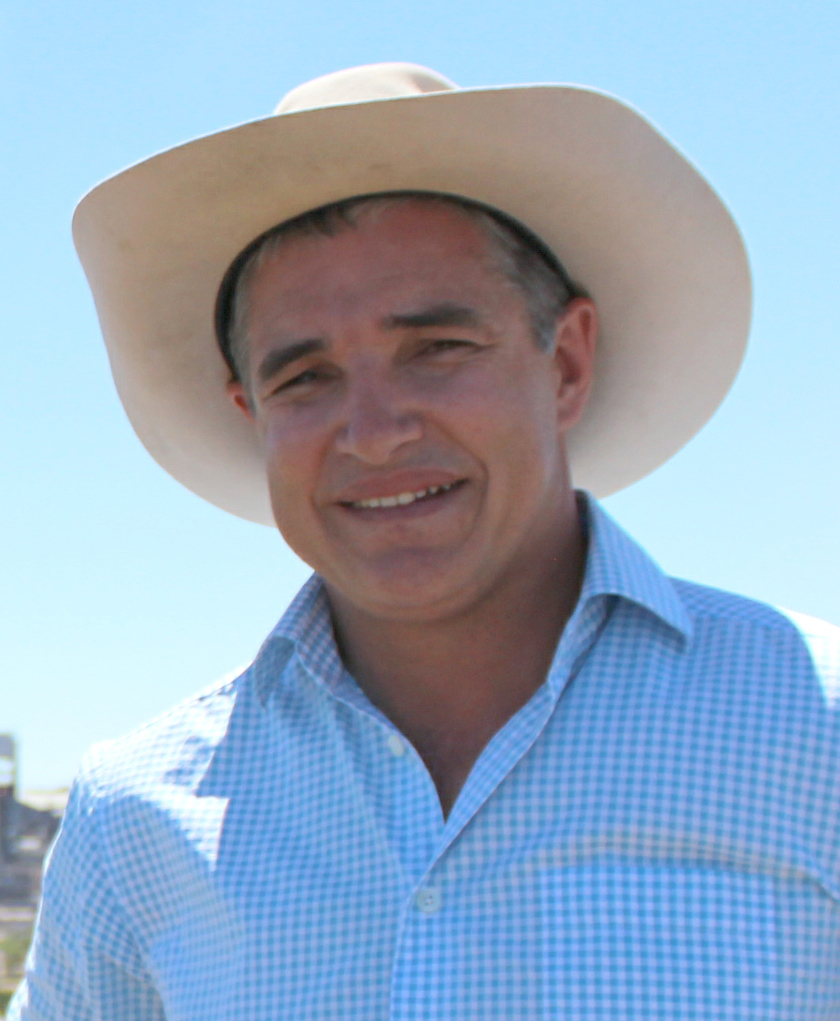

	First party	Second party	Third party
Leader	Annastacia Palaszczuk	Deb Frecklington	Robbie Katter
Party	Labor	Liberal National	Katter's Australian
Leader since	28 March 2012	12 December 2017	2 February 2015
Leader's seat	Inala	Nanango	Traeger
Last election	48 seats, 35.4%	39 seats, 33.7%	3 seats, 2.32%
Seats before	48	38 (Note: At the previous election, Jason Costigan won the Electoral district of Whitsunday under the Liberal National Party, however was expelled from the party in February 2019. After sitting as an independent MP for over eight-months, Costigan established, and lead, his own party to the election.)	3
Seats won	52	34	3
Seat change	▲4	▼4	Steady
Popular vote	1,134,969	1,029,442	72,168
Percentage	39.6%	35.9%	2.5%
Swing	▲4.1	▲2.2	▲0.2
TPP	53.2%	46.8%
TPP swing	▲1.9	▼1.9
	Fourth party	Fifth party	Sixth party
		ON	NQF
Leader	No leader	No leader	Jason Costigan
Party	Greens	One Nation	NQ First
Leader since	N/A	N/A	18 November 2019
Leader's seat	N/A	N/A	Whitsunday (lost seat)
Last election	1 seat, 10.0%	1 seat, 13.7%	New party
Seats before	1	1	1
Seats won	2	1	0
Seat change	▲1	Steady	▼1
Popular vote	271,514	204,316	5,616
Percentage	9.5%	7.1%	0.2%
Swing	▼0.5	▼6.6	▲0.2
Premier before election
Annastacia Palaszczuk
Labor
Elected Premier
Annastacia Palaszczuk
Labor

The 2020 Queensland state election was held on 31 October to elect all 93 members to the 57th Legislative Assembly of Queensland. The Labor Party was returned to government for a third-term, led by incumbent premier Annastacia Palaszczuk. With 47 seats needed to form a majority government, Labor won 52 seats, including all but five in Brisbane, while the Liberal National Party won 34 seats and formed opposition. On the crossbench, Katter's Australian Party retained its 3 seats, the Queensland Greens picked up South Brisbane for a total of 2, Pauline Hanson's One Nation retained Mirani and independent Sandy Bolton retained her seat of Noosa.

Both major parties managed a small swing to them on primary votes, as a result of One Nation's vote sharply declining. On the two-party-preferred vote, Labor had a small swing to it statewide, though the party did notably lose some ground to the LNP in some key seats, including the ultra-marginal seats of Burdekin and Whitsunday, and the LNP also won both Toowoomba-based seats with increased majorities. Labor picked up five seats from the LNP, but notably former Deputy Premier Jackie Trad lost her seat of South Brisbane to the Greens.

At 11pm on 31 October, Liberal National Party leader Deb Frecklington conceded defeat, congratulating Palaszczuk on her victory. Frecklington initially indicated that she would stay on as party leader, but on 2 November announced that she would convene a party meeting and resign as leader. David Crisafulli won the ensuing leadership spill and was elected LNP leader on 12 November 2020.

Palaszczuk became the first female party leader to win three state elections in Australia, as well as the first Queensland Premier to increase their party's seat total across three successive elections.

== Retiring members ==
=== Labor ===
- Kate Jones MP (Cooper) – Announced 10 September 2020
- Anthony Lynham MP (Stafford) – Announced 10 September 2020
- Coralee O'Rourke MP (Mundingburra) – Announced 5 September 2020

=== Liberal National ===
- Mark McArdle (Caloundra) – Announced retirement 27 June 2019
- Ted Sorensen (Hervey Bay) – Announced retirement 25 May 2020
- Simone Wilson (Pumicestone) – Announced retirement 27 September 2019

== Results ==
↓
52	2	1	1	3	34
ALP	GRN	IND	ONP	KAP	LNP

Legislative Assembly (IRV) – Turnout 87.9% (CV)
Party	Votes	%	Swing	Seats	+/–
Labor	1,134,969	39.57	▲+4.14	52	▲4
Liberal National	1,029,442	35.89	▲+2.20	34	▼5
Greens	271,514	9.47	▼−0.53	2	▲1
One Nation	204,316	7.12	▼−6.60	1	Steady
Katter's Australian	72,168	2.52	▲+0.20	3	Steady
Legalise Cannabis	26,146	0.91	▲+0.91	0	Steady
United Australia	17,904	0.62	▲+0.62	0	Steady
Informed Medical Options	17,546	0.61	▲+0.61	0	Steady
Animal Justice	9,703	0.34	▲+0.34	0	Steady
North Queensland First	5,616	0.20	▲+0.20	0	Steady
Civil Liberties and Motorists	5,207	0.18	▼−0.08 (Note: Compared to 2017 election total of Consumer Rights, which was renamed to Civil Liberties and Motorists at the 2020 election.)	0	Steady
Shooters, Fishers, Farmers	2,801	0.10	▲+0.10	0	Steady
Independents	70,992	2.48	▼−2.10	1	Steady
Formal votes	2,868,324	96.60	▲+0.94		
Informal votes	101,023	3.40	▼−0.94		
Total	2,969,347	100		93	
Registered voters / turnout	3,377,476	87.92	▲+0.39		
Two-party-preferred vote
Labor	1,524,766	53.2	▲1.9		
Liberal National	1,343,558	46.8	▼1.9		

=== Vote summary ===
Popular vote
Labor	39.57%
LNP	35.89%
Greens	9.47%
One Nation	7.12%
Katter's	2.52%
Independents	2.48%
Other	2.95%

Two-party preferred vote
Labor	53.2%
LNP	46.8%

Seats summary
Labor	55.91%
LNP	36.56%
Katter's	3.23%
Greens	2.15%
One Nation	1.08%
Independents	1.08%

== Seats changing hands ==
Seat	2017 Election			Swing	2020 Election		
Seat	Party	Member	Margin	Swing	Margin	Member	Party
Bundaberg	Liberal National	David Batt	4.20	–4.21	0.01	Tom Smith	Labor
Caloundra	Liberal National	Mark McArdle	3.41	–5.92	2.51	Jason Hunt	Labor
Hervey Bay	Liberal National	Ted Sorensen	9.10	–11.12	2.02	Adrian Tantari	Labor
Nicklin	Liberal National	Marty Hunt	5.28	–5.42	0.14	Robert Skelton	Labor
Pumicestone	Liberal National	Simone Wilson	0.84	–6.11	5.27	Ali King	Labor
South Brisbane	Labor	Jackie Trad	3.55	–8.90	5.35	Amy MacMahon	Greens

- Members listed in italics did not contest their seat at this election.
- The Liberal National Party also retained the seat of Whitsunday, where the sitting Liberal National member had resigned and contested the election as a member of their own party.

The swing between the major parties in each seat varied across the state. However, Labor managed a small statewide swing to it.

Queenslanders have been known to, at some points in time, vote for Labor on the state level and the LNP on the federal level; in 2019, when the federal Coalition government led by Scott Morrison was unexpectedly re-elected for a third consecutive term, the LNP won 23 of the 30 House of Representatives seats in Queensland and 58.44% of the two-party-preferred vote in the state, with Morrison's victory being credited to a stronger-than-expected performance in Queensland and Tasmania, despite Queensland having a state Labor government.

Ultimately, Labor managed to gain five seats from the LNP, including two Sunshine Coast seats (Caloundra and Nicklin), two seats in smaller regional cities (Bundaberg and Hervey Bay) and one seat in Brisbane (Pumicestone). However, Labor lost the seat of South Brisbane to the Greens, therefore giving Labor a net seat change of +4.

The seat of Bundaberg was won by Labor with a margin of just nine votes, currently the smallest margin of any federal or state electorate in Australia.

Labor's defeat in South Brisbane was significant in two ways. The Greens won their second state seat in Queensland, after winning Maiwar from the LNP in 2017. However, it also led to the defeat of sitting Deputy Premier Jackie Trad. Trad became the first sitting Deputy Premier of Queensland to be unseated since 1947 (when Labor's Ted Walsh was unseated).

One Nation contested 90 seats at this election, but the party's vote dropped dramatically, having almost halved. One Nation finished second in many seats in 2017, but in 2020 the party only finished second in one seat: the Labor-held seat of Bundamba. Nevertheless, One Nation managed to get an increased majority in the only lower house seat in Australia that it currently holds: Mirani (represented by Stephen Andrew since 2017).

While Labor received a small swing to it in most seats, the party did lose some ground to the LNP in a few key seats, including Buderim, Cook, Mackay, Toowoomba North and Whitsunday.

The LNP managed to regain the seat of Whitsunday, where the sitting member (Jason Costigan) was expelled from the LNP and formed his own party, North Queensland First. The LNP candidate, Amanda Camm, managed to win the seat with an increased majority over the Labor Party.

== Post-election pendulum ==
Government seats
Marginal
Bundaberg	Tom Smith	ALP	0.01%
Nicklin	Robert Skelton	ALP	0.14%
Hervey Bay	Adrian Tantari	ALP	2.02%
Caloundra	Jason Hunt	ALP	2.51%
Barron River	Craig Crawford	ALP	3.06%
Townsville	Scott Stewart	ALP	3.12%
Thuringowa	Aaron Harper	ALP	3.25%
Redlands	Kim Richards	ALP	3.90%
Mundingburra	Les Walker	ALP	3.93%
Aspley	Bart Mellish	ALP	5.16%
Pumicestone	Ali King	ALP	5.27%
Cairns	Michael Healy	ALP	5.59%
Keppel	Brittany Lauga	ALP	5.63%
Fairly safe
Redcliffe	Yvette D'Ath	ALP	6.11%
Cook	Cynthia Lui	ALP	6.26%
Pine Rivers	Nikki Boyd	ALP	6.70%
Mackay	Julieanne Gilbert	ALP	6.72%
Mansfield	Corrine McMillan	ALP	6.80%
Gaven	Meaghan Scanlon	ALP	7.75%
Springwood	Mick de Brenni	ALP	8.39%
Rockhampton	Barry O'Rourke	ALP	8.62%
Macalister	Melissa McMahon	ALP	9.54%
Capalaba	Don Brown	ALP	9.81%
Safe
Cooper	Jonty Bush	ALP	10.49%
Ferny Grove	Mark Furner	ALP	10.97%
McConnel	Grace Grace	ALP	11.06%
Murrumba	Steven Miles	ALP	11.33%
Bulimba	Di Farmer	ALP	11.39%
Stafford	Jimmy Sullivan	ALP	11.88%
Maryborough	Bruce Saunders	ALP	11.89%
Mulgrave	Curtis Pitt	ALP	12.24%
Mount Ommaney	Jess Pugh	ALP	12.61%
Bancroft	Chris Whiting	ALP	12.80%
Kurwongbah	Shane King	ALP	13.15%
Greenslopes	Joe Kelly	ALP	13.20%
Lytton	Joan Pease	ALP	13.35%
Logan	Linus Power	ALP	13.39%
Miller	Mark Bailey	ALP	13.82%
Ipswich West	Jim Madden	ALP	14.35%
Toohey	Peter Russo	ALP	14.52%
Stretton	Duncan Pegg	ALP	14.82%
Nudgee	Leanne Linard	ALP	15.09%
Waterford	Shannon Fentiman	ALP	16.02%
Ipswich	Jennifer Howard	ALP	16.52%
Morayfield	Mark Ryan	ALP	16.73%
Jordan	Charis Mullen	ALP	17.10%
Sandgate	Stirling Hinchliffe	ALP	17.30%
Algester	Leeanne Enoch	ALP	17.77%
Very safe
Bundamba	Lance McCallum	ALP	20.68% v ONP
Gladstone	Glenn Butcher	ALP	23.49%
Woodridge	Cameron Dick	ALP	26.25%
Inala	Annastacia Palaszczuk	ALP	28.17%

Non-government seats
Marginal
Currumbin	Laura Gerber	LNP	0.52%
Coomera	Michael Crandon	LNP	1.08%
Burleigh	Michael Hart	LNP	1.21%
Chatsworth	Steve Minnikin	LNP	1.29%
Clayfield	Tim Nicholls	LNP	1.55%
Glass House	Andrew Powell	LNP	1.59%
Everton	Tim Mander	LNP	2.24%
Whitsunday	Amanda Camm	LNP	3.26%
Theodore	Mark Boothman	LNP	3.33%
Moggill	Christian Rowan	LNP	3.59%
Ninderry	Dan Purdie	LNP	4.11%
Mermaid Beach	Ray Stevens	LNP	4.39%
Oodgeroo	Mark Robinson	LNP	4.48%
Buderim	Brent Mickelberg	LNP	5.29%
Southport	Rob Molhoek	LNP	5.41%
Fairly safe
Burdekin	Dale Last	LNP	7.05%
Toowoomba North	Trevor Watts	LNP	7.32%
Gympie	Tony Perrett	LNP	8.49%
Maroochydore	Fiona Simpson	LNP	9.12%
Kawana	Jarrod Bleijie	LNP	9.31%
Safe
Bonney	Sam O'Connor	LNP	10.07%
Mudgeeraba	Ros Bates	LNP	10.09%
Toowoomba South	David Janetzki	LNP	10.22%
Burnett	Stephen Bennett	LNP	10.79%
Scenic Rim	Jon Krause	LNP	11.45%
Lockyer	Jim McDonald	LNP	11.52%
Nanango	Deb Frecklington	LNP	12.21%
Southern Downs	James Lister	LNP	14.09%
Callide	Colin Boyce	LNP	15.83%
Surfers Paradise	John-Paul Langbroek	LNP	16.22%
Broadwater	David Crisafulli	LNP	16.57%
Gregory	Lachlan Millar	LNP	17.25%
Condamine	Pat Weir	LNP	19.20%
Very safe
Warrego	Ann Leahy	LNP	23.15%
Crossbench seats
South Brisbane	Amy MacMahon	GRN	5.35% v ALP
Maiwar	Michael Berkman	GRN	6.32% v LNP
Mirani	Stephen Andrew	ONP	8.98% v ALP
Hinchinbrook	Nick Dametto	KAP	14.76% v LNP
Noosa	Sandy Bolton	IND	15.85% v LNP
Hill	Shane Knuth	KAP	22.55% v ALP
Traeger	Robbie Katter	KAP	24.72% v ALP

== Subsequent changes ==
- On 10 June 2021, Duncan Pegg (Stretton) died. At the by-election on 24 July 2021, James Martin retained the seat for the Labor Party.
- On 29 March 2022, Colin Boyce (Callide) resigned. At the by-election on 18 June 2022, Bryson Head retained the seat for the Liberal National Party.
- On 31 December 2023, Premier Annastacia Palaszczuk (Inala) resigned. At the by-election on 16 March 2024, Margie Nightingale retained the seat for the Labor Party.
- On 27 January 2024, Jim Madden (Ipswich West) resigned. At the by-election on 16 March 2024, Darren Zanow gained the seat for the Liberal National Party.

== Background ==
At the 2017 election, Labor won majority with 48 of 93 seats and formed government in the 56th Queensland Parliament. The LNP won 39 seats and formed opposition. Being allocated to crossbench, the Katter's Australian Party won three seats, One Nation won one seat, the Greens won one seat and Independent Sandy Bolton won the seat of Noosa.

Despite two by-elections, the composition of the 56th Parliament was unchanged, with the exception of the member for Whitsunday Jason Costigan. He was expelled from the LNP over allegations of behavioural impropriety, resulting in him joining the crossbench and eventually forming the North Queensland First party.

Labor has won all but one state election since 1989, and has only been out of government for five years since then. It lost its majority in 1996, giving way to a Coalition minority government that was defeated in 1998. In 2012, it suffered the worst defeat of a sitting government in the state's history, but regained power in 2015.

This election also marks the first time that both leaders of the current government and opposition have been female in a Queensland state election. It is only the second time it has occurred in an Australian state, territory or federal election, the first time being the 1995 ACT election.

A record number of minor parties and candidates ran in the election, 342 minor party candidates, 69 as independents or not officially endorsed by any party. Labor, the LNP and the Greens ran candidates in every electorate, Pauline Hanson's One Nation ran in 90 electorates.

== Electoral system ==
Queensland has compulsory voting and uses full-preference instant-runoff voting for single-member electorates. The election was conducted by the Electoral Commission of Queensland (ECQ).

Of the political parties contesting the election, the party, or coalition, that win the majority of seats (at least 47) forms the government.

The party, or coalition that gains the next highest number of seats forms the opposition, with the remaining parties and independents candidates being allocated to the cross bench.

Queensland Parliament is the only unicameral state parliament in Australia. It has just one House—the Legislative Assembly.

== Key dates ==
The election was for all 93 members of the Legislative Assembly. Pursuant to Constitution (Fixed Term Parliament) Amendment Act 2015 Queensland has fixed terms, with all elections following the 2020 vote scheduled every four years on the last Saturday of October. The Governor may call an election earlier than scheduled if the Government does not maintain confidence, or the annual appropriation bill fails to pass.

Under the legislation, the caretaker period commenced on 5 October 2020, 26 days prior to the election date.

Due to the COVID-19 pandemic, consideration was given to holding this election as a full postal ballot, but this did not occur. Despite this, a record number of postal votes was cast at the election, with a majority of Queenslanders voting before polling day.

The election timetable is as follows:

Date	Event
6 October 2020	Queensland Parliament dissolved by Governor Paul de Jersey
10 October 2020	Close of electoral rolls
11 October 2020	Close of nominations
19 October 2020	Early voting begins
30 October 2020	Early voting ends at 6 pm
31 October 2020	Polling day, between the hours of 8 am and 6 pm
10 November 2020	Last day for receipt of postal votes by 6 pm

== Registered parties ==
Since the previous election, 2017, six political parties were registered by Queensland's Electoral Commission: Shooters, Fishers and Farmers Party, North Queensland First, the Animal Justice Party, Clive Palmer's United Australia Party, Informed Medical Options Party, and Legalise Cannabis Queensland.

The following twelve registered parties contested the election, including a record number of minor parties:

- Australian Labor Party (Queensland Branch)
- Queensland Greens
- Pauline Hanson's One Nation
- Liberal National Party of Queensland
- Katter's Australian Party
- Civil Liberties & Motorists Party
- Shooters, Fishers and Farmers Party
- North Queensland First
- Animal Justice Party
- Clive Palmer's United Australia Party
- Informed Medical Options Party
- Legalise Cannabis Qld (Party)

=== Preferences ===
The LNP confirmed it would preference Labor candidates last on all of its how-to-vote cards. An exception is for Maiwar, a seat held by the Greens, where the LNP put the sitting Greens member below the Labor candidate in the how-to-vote card.

In response to LNP's preferences, Katter's Australia Party announced it would preference Greens candidates last on its party's how-to-vote cards, with party leader Robbie Katter suggesting the LNP's decision would lead to Greens candidates winning a number of seats in Brisbane. Katter's Australia Party and Pauline Hanson's One Nation also announced a preference deal on 8 October, with the parties to preference each other in second place on their how-to-vote cards.

Labor confirmed it would preference One Nation last on how-to-vote cards.

== Retiring MPs ==
=== Labor ===
- Kate Jones MP (Cooper) – announced 10 September 2020
- Anthony Lynham MP (Stafford) – announced 10 September 2020
- Coralee O'Rourke MP (Mundingburra) – announced 5 September 2020

=== Liberal National ===
- Mark McArdle MP (Caloundra) – announced retirement 27 June 2019
- Ted Sorensen MP (Hervey Bay) – announced retirement 25 May 2020
- Simone Wilson MP (Pumicestone) – announced retirement 27 September 2019

== Candidates ==
At the close of nominations on 11 October 2020, 597 candidates had nominated for the state election—the highest number of candidates at a Queensland state election, surpassing the previous record of 453 candidates at the 2017 election.

== Leaders' debates ==
The first leaders' debate of the campaign between Palaszczuk and Frecklington was a People's Forum hosted by Sky News and the Courier Mail and was held on 28 October. The selected audience consisted of undecided voters who post-debate were asked which party they would vote for based on the debate performance of the respective leaders. A majority of 53% opted for Labor, 30% for the LNP, whilst the remaining 17% were undecided.

== Polling ==
Several research, media and polling firms conduct opinion polls during the parliamentary term and prior to the state election in relation to voting. Most firms use an estimate of the flow of preferences at the previous election to determine the two-party-preferred vote; others ask respondents to nominate preferences.

=== Graphical summary ===
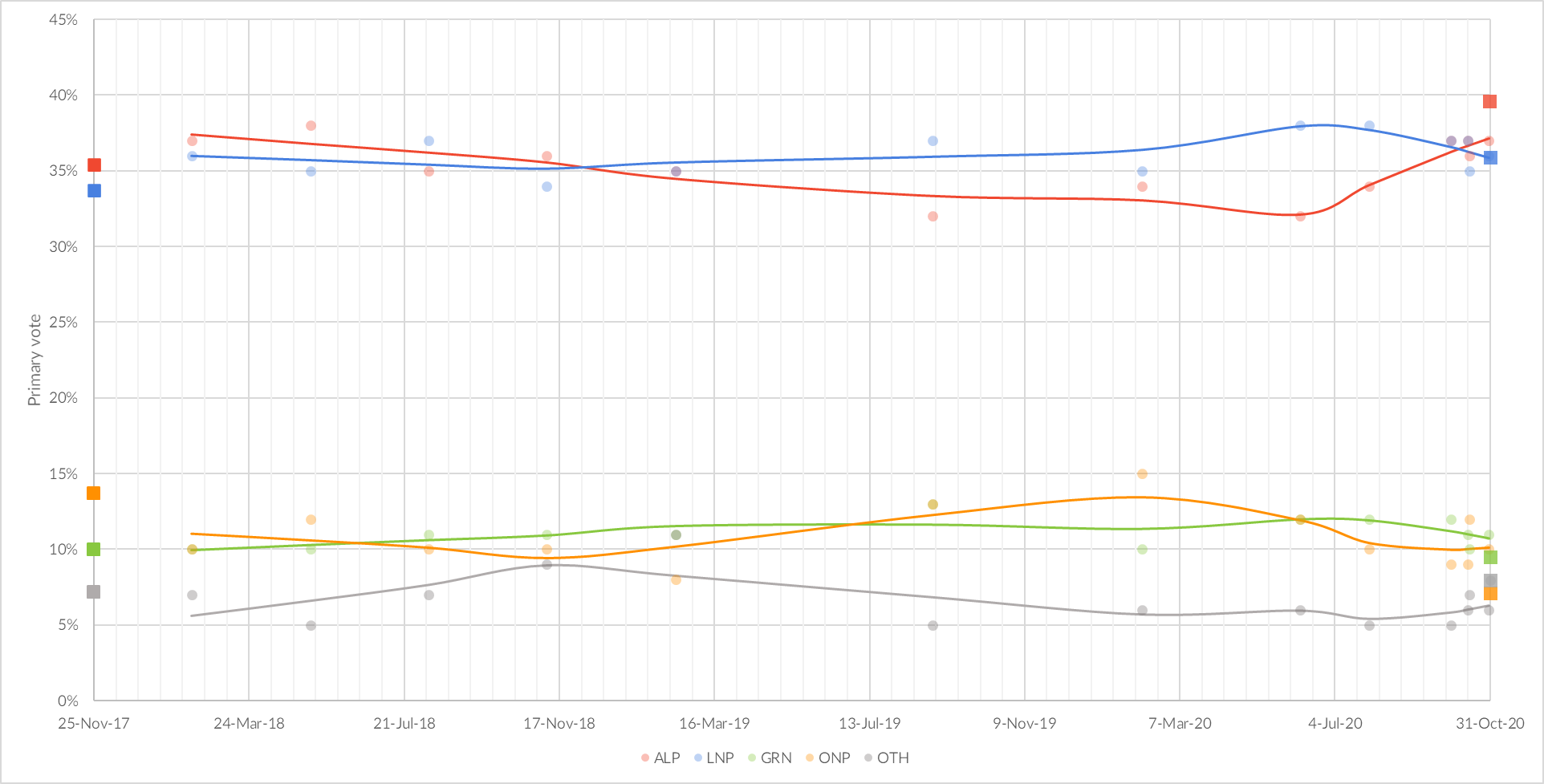
Primary vote.

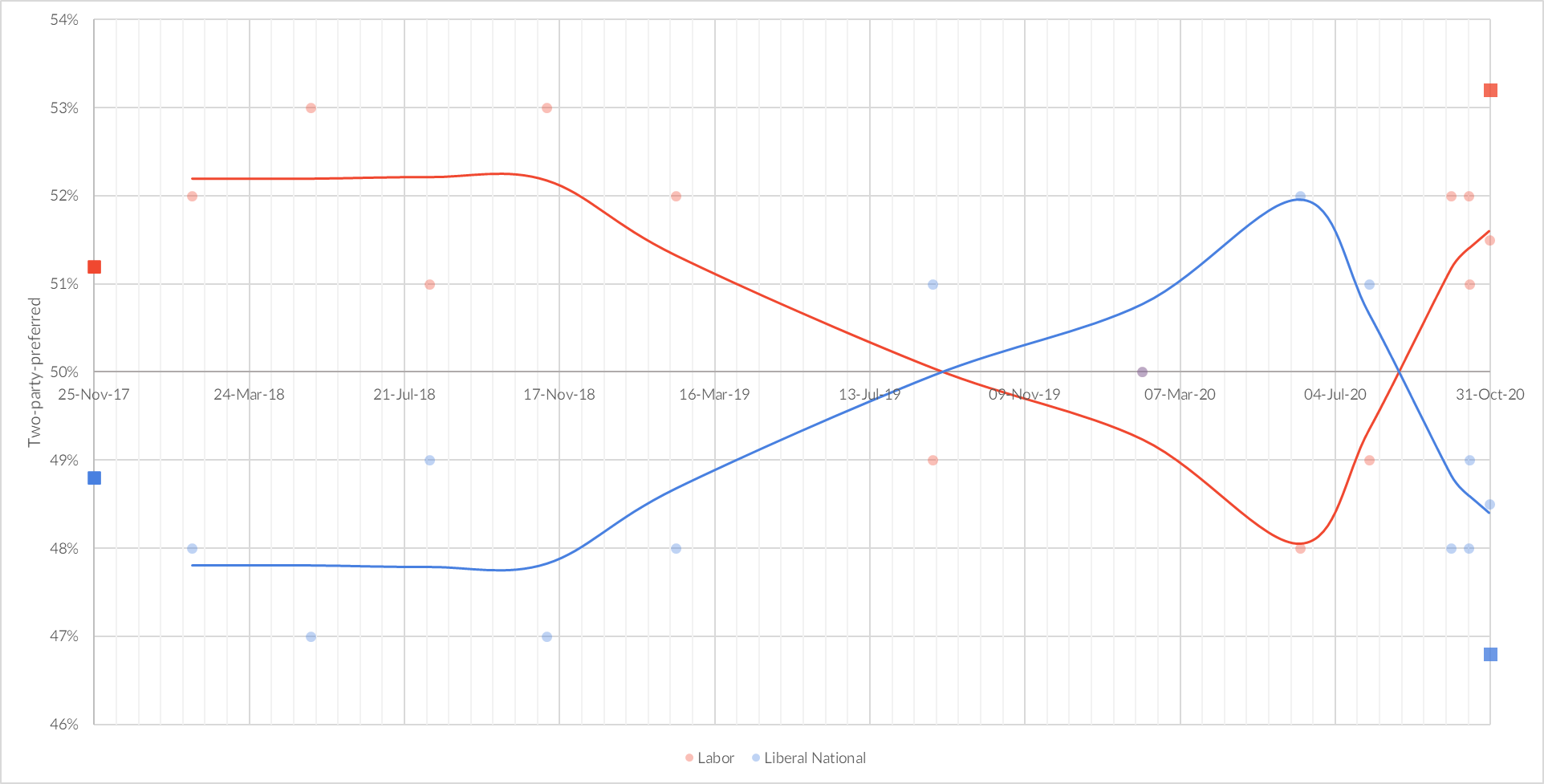
Two-party-preferred vote.

Aggregate data of voting intention from all opinion polling since the last state election. Local regression trends for each party are shown as solid lines.

=== Opinion polling ===
==== Voting intention ====
Legislative Assembly polling
Date	Firm	Primary vote					2pp vote
		ALP	LNP	ON	Green	Other	ALP	LNP
31 October 2020 election		39.6%	35.9%	7.1%	9.5%	7.9%	53.2%	46.8%
25–30 Oct 2020	Newspoll	37%	36%	10%	11%	6%	51.5%	48.5%
12–15 Oct 2020	Roy Morgan	36%	35%	12%	10%	7%	51%	49%
9–14 Oct 2020	Newspoll	37%	37%	9%	11%	6%	52%	48%
24 Sep–1 Oct 2020	YouGov	37%	37%	9%	12%	5%	52%	48%
30 July 2020	Newspoll	34%	38%	11%	12%	5%	49%	51%
7 June 2020	YouGov	32%	38%	12%	12%	6%	48%	52%
7 February 2020	YouGov	34%	35%	15%	10%	6%	50%	50%
30 August 2019	YouGov	32%	37%	13%	13%	5%	49%	51%
13–14 February 2019	YouGov	35%	35%	8%	11%	11%	52%	48%
7–8 November 2018	YouGov	36%	34%	10%	11%	9%	53%	47%
8–9 August 2018	YouGov	35%	37%	10%	11%	7%	51%	49%
9–10 May 2018	YouGov	38%	35%	12%	10%	5%	53%	47%
7–8 Feb 2018	YouGov	37%	36%	10%	10%	7%	52%	48%
12 December 2017 Deb Frecklington becomes leader of the Liberal National Party and Leader of the Opposition
25 Nov 2017 election		35.4%	33.7%	13.7%	10.0%	7.2%	51.2%	48.8%
21–24 Nov 2017	Newspoll	36%	34%	13%	10%	7%	52.5%	47.5%
24 Nov 2017	Galaxy	37%	35%	12%	9%	7%	52%	48%
20 Nov 2017	ReachTEL	34%	30%	17%	10%	9%	51%	49%

==== Better premier and leadership approval polling ====
Opinion polls conducted for preferred premier View source data.
Approval ratings of Annastacia Palaszczuk View source data.
Approval ratings of Deb Frecklington View source data.

Better premier/approval polling
Date	Firm	Better premier		Palaszczuk		Frecklington
		Palaszczuk	Frecklington	Satisfied	Dissatisfied	Satisfied	Dissatisfied
9–14 Oct 2020	Newspoll	56%	32%	63%	33%	37%	44%
24 Sep–1 Oct 2020	YouGov	48%	22%	57%	27%	29%	32%
21 September 2020	Newspoll	-	-	63%	33%	-	-
30 July 2020	Newspoll	57%	26%	64%	29%	34%	42%
12 June 2020	Liberal National Party	42%	19%	-	-	-	-
7 June 2020	YouGov	44%	23%	49%	33%	26%	29%
7 February 2020	YouGov	34%	22%	29%	44%	23%	33%
30 August 2019	YouGov	34%	29%	34%	45%	30%	30%
13–14 February 2019	YouGov	47%	27%	48%	38%	31%	35%
7–8 November 2018	YouGov	43%	26%	46%	37%	35%	29%
8–9 August 2018	YouGov	-	-	41%	38%	31%	26%
9–10 May 2018	YouGov	47%	27%	46%	38%	31%	28%
7–8 Feb 2018	YouGov	42%	31%	-	-	-	-
12 December 2017 Deb Frecklington becomes leader of the Liberal National Party and Leader of the Opposition

==== Electoral district polling ====
Date	Firm	Electorate	Voting intention								2cp vote		
Date	Firm	Electorate	ALP	LNP	ONP	GRN	KAP	UAP	LCA	OTH	ALP	LNP	GRN
26 Oct 2020	Newspoll	South Brisbane	32.0%	24.0%	—N/a	39.0%	—N/a	—N/a	—N/a	—N/a	45.5%	—N/a	54.5%
24 Oct 2020	Newspoll	Mansfield	41.0%	45.0%	2.0%	9.0%	—N/a	0.5%	1.5%	1.0%	50.5%	49.5%	—N/a
24 Oct 2020	Newspoll	Mundingburra	35.0%	32.0%	11.0%	4.0%	14.0%	2.0%	2.0%	—N/a	49.5%	50.5%	—N/a
24 Oct 2020	Newspoll	Pumicestone	45.0%	37.0%	9.0%	6.0%	—N/a	1.0%	2.0%	—N/a	54.0%	46.0%	—N/a
