= Electoral district of Hervey Bay =

State electoral district of Queensland, Australia

Hervey Bay Queensland—Legislative Assembly
- Map of the electoral district of Hervey Bay, 2017
- State: Queensland
- Dates current: 1992–present
- MP: David Lee
- Party: Liberal National
- Namesake: Hervey Bay
- Electors: 39,626 (2020)
- Area: 1,809 km^{2} (698.5 sq mi)
- Demographic: Provincial (mainland) and remote (K'gari)
- Coordinates: 25°15′S 153°3′E
Electorates around Hervey Bay:
Burnett	Coral Sea	Coral Sea
Maryborough	Hervey Bay	Coral Sea
Maryborough	Gympie	Coral Sea

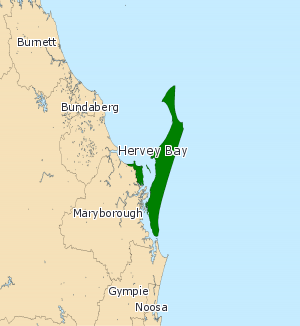
2008 map

Hervey Bay is an electoral district of the Legislative Assembly in the Australian state of Queensland. It contains the majority of its namesake city, Hervey Bay, and also includes K'gari, formerly known as Fraser Island.

== Members for Hervey Bay ==
Member	Party	Term
Bill Nunn	Labor	1992–1998
David Dalgleish	One Nation	1998–1999
David Dalgleish	City Country Alliance	1999–2001
Andrew McNamara	Labor	2001–2009
Ted Sorensen	Liberal National	2009–2020
Adrian Tantari	Labor	2020–2024
David Lee	Liberal National	2024–present

== Election results ==
2024 Queensland state election: Hervey Bay
Party	Candidate	Votes	%	±%
Liberal National	David Lee	16,719	43.77	+9.42
Labor	Adrian Tantari	12,331	32.28	−7.22
One Nation	Quinn Hendry	4,916	12.87	+1.73
Legalise Cannabis	Jeff Knipe	2,679	7.01	+7.01
Greens	Pat Walsh	1,553	4.07	+0.94
Total formal votes		38,198	96.34	−0.11
Informal votes		1,450	3.66	+0.11
Turnout		39,648	88.57	−0.07
Two-party-preferred result
Liberal National	David Lee	22,306	58.40	+10.42
Labor	Adrian Tantari	15,892	41.60	−10.42
Liberal National gain from Labor		Swing	+10.42	

Primary vote results in Hervey Bay (Parties that did not get 5% of the vote are omitted)
Labor
Liberal National

National
Liberal

One Nation
City Country Alliance
Family First
Greens
Katter's Australian
Australian Democrats
Palmer United
Independent
View source data.
Two-candidate-preferred vote results in Hervey Bay View source data.
