= Liberal National Party of Queensland =

Conservative political party in Queensland, Australia

Liberal National Party Liberal National Party of Queensland
- Abbreviation: LNP
- Leader: David Crisafulli
- Deputy Leader: Jarrod Bleijie
- President: Doug Hawkes
- Vice President: Douglas Hawkes; Joshua Auld
- Founded: 26 July 2008; 18 years ago
- Merger of: Liberal; National
- Headquarters: Albion, Brisbane, Queensland, Australia
- Youth wing: Young LNP
- Membership (2022): ▼11,000
- Ideology: Conservatism (Australian); Agrarianism; Faction: Christian right
- Political position: Centre-right to right-wing
- National affiliation: Liberal Party (Note: 10 members of the House of Representatives and 2 members of the Senate are part of the Liberal Party caucus. The LNP is the Queensland division of the Liberal Party.); National Party (Note: 6 members of the House of Representatives and 2 members of the Senate are part of the National Party caucus. The LNP is affiliated with The Nationals.)
- Colours: Blue
- Legislative Assembly: 53 / 93
- House of Representatives: 16 / 30 (Queensland seats)
- Senate: 4 / 12 (Queensland seats)
- Brisbane City Council: 20 / 27

Website
- www.lnp.org.au

The Liberal National Party of Queensland (LNP) is a major conservative political party in Queensland, Australia. It was formed on 26 July 2008 by a merger of the Queensland divisions of the Liberal and National parties. In other states, the two parties remain separate and distinct, in a Coalition, or the Nationals do not contest elections. Federal LNP parliamentarians sit in the party room of either the Liberals or the Nationals, depending on which federal party their seat has been allocated to by the LNP. The LNP is a division of the Liberal Party of Australia and an affiliate of the National Party of Australia.

After suffering defeat at its first election in 2009, the LNP entered government for the first time at the 2012 election, winning 78 out of 89 seats, a record majority in the unicameral Parliament of Queensland. Campbell Newman became the first LNP Premier of Queensland. The Newman Government was subsequently defeated by the Labor Party at the 2015 election. Since 1989, the LNP and its predecessor parties have been in government for just 5 years. The party returned to power at the 2024 Queensland state election, unseating the three-term Labor government led by then-Premier Steven Miles.

== History ==
=== Background ===
From the 1970s, the Queensland divisions of the National Party and Liberal Party had found themselves in frequent competition with one another for seats in Queensland. The Liberal Party (and its predecessors) and the National Party (formerly the Country Party and National Country Party) have been in a coalition at the federal level for all but a few years since 1923. In most parts of Australia, the Liberal Party is the larger party, concentrated in urban areas, with the Nationals a junior partner operating exclusively in rural and regional areas. Competition between the two is thus minimised as the two attempt to win more seats combined than the Australian Labor Party.

However, Queensland is the second most decentralised state in Australia (after Tasmania). Like most state capitals in Australia, Brisbane is far and away Queensland's largest urban centre; it has more than double the population of the next largest urbanised area, the Gold Coast, and is five times as large as the third-largest, the Sunshine Coast. However, only around 45% of the state's population lives in the Brisbane area. Unlike the rest of Australia, a larger portion of Queensland's population is distributed either in regional cities like Toowoomba, Rockhampton, Townsville, Mackay, Gladstone and Cairns, or in rural areas. As such, the urban-rural divide is not as pronounced in Queensland as in the rest of Australia; in other states, 60% or more of the population lives in and around the state's capital city.

Historically, the Country/National Party was stronger in these regional centres than the Liberals. As a result, the Nationals had more seats than the Liberals and their predecessors, and had been the senior partner in the non-Labor Coalition since 1924. This division into urban, regional and rural areas was, for most of the twentieth century, reflected in a system of malapportionment that made it easier for rural-based parties to win more seats in Parliament.

The formation of the LNP was actually the third attempt to unite the non-Labor side in Queensland. In 1925, the United Party — the Queensland branch of the urban-based Nationalist Party — and the Country Party merged as the Country and Progressive National Party. This party won government in 1929 under former Country Party leader Arthur Edward Moore, but was defeated in 1932 and split apart in 1936. In 1941, the Queensland divisions of the United Australia Party and Country Party merged as the Country-National Organisation, under Frank Nicklin, also of the Country side. However, this merger only lasted until 1944.

During the 1970s, the Country Party began running candidates in the more urbanised south-east corner of the state, including the Brisbane area, in direct competition with the Liberals. This was part of a larger strategy by the federal party to expand its base outside of rural areas, reflected in successive name changes to the National Country Party in 1975 and the National Party in 1982. The state party had actually changed its name to the National Party in 1974 as part of its effort to broaden its reach.

After more than a decade of increasingly fraught relations, the Liberals pulled out of the Coalition in 1983. The Nationals came up one seat short of a majority in their own right in the election held later that year. The Nationals then persuaded two Liberals to defect to them, and governed alone until their defeat in 1989.

In 1992, the electoral system was changed to optional preferential voting, meaning that three-cornered contests between Liberal, National and Labor candidates became much more likely to see Labor candidates win. The other change in 1992 was the end of the old zonal electoral system for the Legislative Assembly, the sole chamber of the state's parliament. As a result, 40 of the 89 seats, almost half of the seats in the legislature, were now based in Brisbane. The Liberals and Nationals signed a renewed Coalition agreement in November 1992, two months after Labor easily won a second term. However, it was all but impossible to win a majority government without a substantial base in Brisbane, something that was difficult for the Coalition to do since the Nationals were the senior partner. Brisbane's increased share of the legislature made it politically difficult to win even a minority government without winning a significant share of the capital's seats. Labor was in government for all but three years from 1989 to 2012 in large part because it won at least 30 seats in greater Brisbane at every election. Even when it was briefly consigned to opposition by the Rob Borbidge-led Coalition from 1996 to 1998, Labor still won 31 seats in Brisbane.

The 1995 state election proved just how difficult it was for the Coalition to win during this time. While it actually won a slim majority of the two-party vote, much of that margin was wasted on landslides in the Nationals' heartland. As mentioned above, Labor won 31 seats in Brisbane, allowing it to eke out a one-seat majority. The Labor majority was lost altogether a few months later in a by-election, but the Coalition was only able to form a minority government by a margin of one seat with the support of independent Liz Cunningham. This underscored how difficult the 1992 reforms made it to form even a minority government without a substantial base in Brisbane. The situation became worse with the emergence of other forces on the right such as Pauline Hanson's One Nation and the City Country Alliance, and the advocacy by the Labor Party under Peter Beattie starting in 2001 of a "just vote 1" strategy that caused non-Labor preferences to exhaust instead of leaking to other non-Labor candidates. By the turn of the millennium, many members of both parties felt that a merger would reduce harmful competition between non-Labor candidates and to increase the chances of winning seats in Brisbane from Labor.

The Queensland Liberals and Nationals had contested separately for the Senate in federal elections until the 2007 election, when they ran a join Senate ticket for the first time in 30 years.

=== Formation of the Liberal National Party ===
On 30 May 2008, an agreement in principle to merge was established between the Queensland divisions of the Liberal and National parties. A plebiscite of members of each party was then conducted with a large majority of respondents favouring the proposed merger.

The agreement in principle and a draft constitution were considered by separate meetings of the parties held over 26–27 July 2008, and the LNP was created on 26 July 2008. The inaugural conference of the LNP was held following the adoption of the constitution. The two parties had been meeting in adjoining rooms of the Sofitel Hotel in Brisbane. The wall between the two meetings was removed after both parties approved the merger, and the inaugural conference of the newly merged party began soon afterward.

After the July 2008 merger, the party had 25 members in the Legislative Assembly: 17 originally elected as Nationals, 8 originally elected as Liberals. National Party leader Lawrence Springborg became the merged party's first leader, and remained as Leader of the Opposition. Liberal Party leader Mark McArdle became Deputy Leader of the new party, and remained Deputy Leader of the Opposition. While the new party was dominated by former Nationals, its president acquired full voting rights with the federal Liberals and observer status with the federal Nationals.

The LNP fought its first election as a unified party at the 2009 state election. It managed an eight-seat swing and finished one percentage point behind Labor on the two-party-preferred vote (with optional preference voting). However, it came up 11 seats short of forming government mainly due to winning only six seats in Brisbane. Springborg resigned as leader, later becoming deputy leader under his successor, John-Paul Langbroek. Langbroek is from the Liberal side of the merger, and his election marked the first time since 1925 that the non-Labor side in Queensland had been led by someone aligned federally with the Liberals or their predecessors.

Federal Queensland Liberal and National federal representatives and senators remained affiliated to their respective parties until after the 2010 Federal Election, with senators retaining their affiliation until the new Senate sat in July 2011.

Bruce McIver oversaw the Liberal–National party merger as president, which saw the Queensland Nationals, with their long history of social conservatism, amalgamate with the Queensland branch of the more socially progressive Liberal Party. McIver's time as National Party president coincided with the demotion of members who did not share his socially conservative views. After then parliamentary leader Jeff Seeney disagreed with McIver's opposition to stem-cell research and criticised McIver's email seeking to instruct politicians on how they should exercise their conscience vote, he was soon deposed from the leadership. This led to speculation in the Courier Mail that the Queensland Nationals had been "hijacked by the Christian Right", drawing parallels to similar developments in certain parts of the United States.

On 22 March 2011, Brisbane Lord Mayor Campbell Newman announced that he would seek preselection for the Brisbane-area seat of Ashgrove, a seat with a 7.1 percent Labor majority, and if successful, would challenge Langbroek for the party leadership. Newman, like Langbroek, is from the Liberal side of the merger. Langbroek and Springborg resigned as leader and deputy leader hours later. Under normal circumstances, an LNP MP from a safe seat would have resigned so Newman could get into the chamber via a by-election. However, a by-election could not be arranged. To solve this problem, former Nationals leader Jeff Seeney, who was elected deputy leader at the same time Newman was formally elected leader, became interim parliamentary leader (and hence Leader of the Opposition) while Newman led the party into the 24 March 2012 state election. Seeney agreed to cede the parliamentary leader's post to Newman if he was elected to parliament.

The 2012 state election saw Newman lead the LNP to a landslide victory. The LNP scored a 14.5 percent swing from Labor, just short of 50 percent of the primary vote, and won an additional 44 seats. In the process, the LNP took all but three seats in the Brisbane metropolitan area, in some cases on swings of 10 percent or more. Overall, the LNP won 78 seats to Labor's seven, the largest majority government in Queensland history. Newman won Ashgrove on a swing of 12.7 percent, almost double what he needed to take the seat off Labor. He was sworn in as premier two days later, heading the state's first non-Labor majority government in 23 years.

The LNP appeared to be positioned to win a second term at the 31 January 2015 state election, albeit with a reduced majority. However, in a shock result that had not been foreseen by any commentators, let alone either party, the LNP suffered a 12 percent swing and lost its majority. Labor took 31 seats off the LNP, and came within one seat of rebounding from only nine seats at dissolution to an outright majority. One of the LNP casualties was Newman, who became just the second Queensland premier since Federation to lose his own seat. He immediately announced his retirement from politics, and Springborg was elected his successor on 7 February with Langbroek as his deputy. Although Springborg initially harboured hopes of forming a minority government, this ended when Labor formed a minority government with the support of the lone independent in the chamber.

On 6 May 2016, Tim Nicholls, who is from the Liberal side of the merger, successfully challenged Springborg for the leadership of the party, winning the ballot 22 votes to 19. Deb Frecklington, the member for the ancestrally National seat of Nanango (the seat of former Premier Joh Bjelke-Petersen), was elected deputy leader. Nicholls led the party to defeat at the November 2017 state election. The LNP actually suffered a three-seat swing, allowing Labor to win government in its own right. Nicholls subsequently stepped down as party leader. Frecklington was elevated to the leadership position at a party-room meeting on 12 December 2017, with Tim Mander selected as deputy leader.

Under Frecklington's leadership, the LNP was heavily defeated at the 2020 state election, in which it only managed to win five seats in Brisbane. Frecklington initially planned to stay on as leader, but on 2 November announced that she would call a leadership spill which she would not contest. David Crisafulli, the member for the Gold Coast seat of Broadwater, was elected LNP leader on 12 November 2020, with Toowoomba-area MP David Janetzki as his deputy.

The LNP won at the 2024 state election. Its first election win since 2012 and its second ever election victory in the party's history.

== Function at a federal level ==
The party has in the past supplied a former Deputy Prime Minister; former federal Nationals leader Warren Truss, Deputy Prime Minister in the Abbott Government, was a member of the LNP.

In February 2022, before the 21 May 2022 federal election, out of 29 LNP federal MPs and Senators, 21 sat with the Liberals while eight sat with the Nationals. The eight LNP MPs and Senators who sat with the Nationals were:

- The Hon. David Littleproud MP
- George Christensen MP (Christensen left LNP and Joined One Nation in 2022)
- Michelle Landry MP
- Ken O'Dowd MP
- The Hon. Keith Pitt MP
- Llew O'Brien MP (who was briefly unaffiliated with either federal party in 2020)
- Senator The Hon. Matt Canavan
- Senator Susan McDonald

The affiliation of newly elected members is covered by the following informal agreement:

- Members who gain a seat where the sitting member was not from the LNP will affiliate based on the last LNP member who held the seat.
- For example, if an LNP candidate defeats a Greens sitting member and the seat's most recent LNP member sat with the Liberal, then the new member will affiliate with the Liberals.
- A division of seats was decided upon for new seats or seats that have never been won by the Coalition.

In practice, most LNP MPs from Brisbane and the Gold Coast sit with the Liberals, while those from country seats usually sit with the Nationals. An attempt by Ian Macfarlane to switch his affiliation from the Liberal to the National Party was blocked by the State Executive in 2015. Since 2013, the first and third LNP Senate candidate has associated with the Liberals and the second with the Nationals.

The party has considered forming a separate party room in the Federal Parliament (i.e., separate from the federal Nationals who are formed by NSW and Victorian members). As a separate party the LNP would be the second largest party of the Coalition and would theoretically have a claim to the Deputy Prime Minister's post in any Coalition government.

Llew O'Brien sat with the Nationals until 10 February 2020. He opted to sit within the Coalition party room, but not with the Nationals or Liberals, following his call for a leadership spill against Michael McCormack the week before. O'Brien rejoined the federal Nationals parliamentary party in December 2020.

After the 2022 election, Peter Dutton of the outer Brisbane seat of Dickson became federal leader of the Liberals while David Littleproud of the regional Queensland seat of Maranoa became federal leader of the Nationals. This is the first time that LNP MPs have been federal leaders of both respective federal Coalition partners.

== Electoral performance ==
=== Federal ===
| Election | Votes | Queensland | | Australia | | +/– | Status | Senate | | |
| Election | Votes | % | Seats | % | Seats | +/– | Status | % | Seats | +/- |
|---|---|---|---|---|---|---|---|---|---|---|
| 2010 | 1,130,525 | 47.4 | 21 / 30 | 9.1 | 21 / 150 | ▲21 | Opposition | 41.4 | 3 / 6 | 0 |
| 2013 | 1,152,217 | 45.7 | 22 / 30 | 8.9 | 22 / 150 | ▲1 | Coalition | 41.4 | 3 / 6 | 0 |
| 2016 | 1,153,736 | 43.2 | 21 / 30 | 8.5 | 21 / 150 | ▼1 | Coalition | 35.3 | 5 / 12 | ▼1 |
| 2019 | 1,236,401 | 43.7 | 23 / 30 | 8.7 | 23 / 151 | ▲2 | Coalition | 38.9 | 3 / 6 | ▲1 |
| 2022 | 1,172,515 | 39.6 | 21 / 30 | 8.0 | 21 / 151 | ▼2 | Opposition | 35.2 | 2 / 6 | ▼1 |
| 2025 | 1,094,401 | 35.2 | 16 / 30 | 8.0 | 16 / 151 | ▼5 | Opposition | 30.9 | 2 / 6 | ▼1 |

=== State ===
| Election | Leader | Votes | % | Seats | +/– | Status |
|---|---|---|---|---|---|---|
| 2009 | Lawrence Springborg | 987,018 | 41.6 | 34 / 89 | ▲34 | Opposition |
| 2012 | Campbell Newman | 1,214,402 | 49.6 | 78 / 89 | ▲44 | Majority |
| 2015 | Campbell Newman | 1,083,983 | 41.3 | 42 / 89 | ▼36 | Opposition |
| 2017 | Tim Nicholls | 911,019 | 33.7 | 39 / 93 | ▼3 | Opposition |
| 2020 | Deb Frecklington | 1,029,442 | 35.9 | 34 / 93 | ▼5 | Opposition |
| 2024 | David Crisafulli | 1,289,556 | 41.6 | 52 / 93 | ▲18 | Majority |

== Leadership ==
=== Leaders ===
The list of leaders are as such:

| # | Leader | Electorate | Term start | Term end | Time in office | Elections contested | Premier |
|---|---|---|---|---|---|---|---|
| 1 | Lawrence Springborg | Southern Downs | 27 July 2008 | 2 April 2009 | 249 days | 2009 | Bligh (2007–2012) |
| 2 | John-Paul Langbroek | Surfers Paradise | 2 April 2009 | 22 March 2011 | 1 year, 354 days | none | Bligh (2007–2012) |
| — | Jeff Seeney served as Acting Leader during this interim, following the resignation of John-Paul Langbroek. | | | | | | Bligh (2007–2012) |
| 3 | Campbell Newman | Lord Mayor of Brisbane (2004–2012) | 2 April 2011 | 7 February 2015 (Note: Newman resigned his leadership of the party, however maintained the Premiership until the new Government was sworn in.) | 3 years, 311 days | 2012 | Bligh (2007–2012) |
| 3 | Campbell Newman | Lord Mayor of Brisbane (2004–2012) | 2 April 2011 | 7 February 2015 | 3 years, 311 days | 2012 | Himself (2012–2015) |
| 3 | Campbell Newman | Ashgrove (2012–2015) | 2 April 2011 | 7 February 2015 | 3 years, 311 days | 2012 | Himself (2012–2015) |
| (1) | Lawrence Springborg | Southern Downs | 7 February 2015 | 6 May 2016 | 1 year, 89 days | none | Palaszczuk (2015–2023) |
| 4 | Tim Nicholls | Clayfield | 6 May 2016 | 12 December 2017 | 1 year, 220 days | 2017 | Palaszczuk (2015–2023) |
| 5 | Deb Frecklington | Nanango | 12 December 2017 | 12 November 2020 | 2 years, 336 days | 2020 | Palaszczuk (2015–2023) |
| 6 | David Crisafulli | Broadwater | 12 November 2020 (Election) | Incumbent | 6 years, 6 days | 2024 | Palaszczuk (2015–2023) |
| 6 | David Crisafulli | Broadwater | 12 November 2020 (Election) | Incumbent | 6 years, 6 days | 2024 | Miles (2023–2024) |
| 6 | David Crisafulli | Broadwater | 12 November 2020 (Election) | Incumbent | 6 years, 6 days | 2024 | Himself (2024–) |

=== Deputy Leaders ===
| # | Deputy Leader | Electorate | Term start | Term end | Time in office | Leader |
|---|---|---|---|---|---|---|
| 1 | Mark McArdle | Caloundra | 27 July 2008 | 2 April 2009 | 249 days | Lawrence Springborg |
| 2 | Lawrence Springborg | Southern Downs | 2 April 2009 | 11 April 2011 | 2 years, 9 days | John-Paul Langbroek |
| — | Tim Nicholls served as Acting Deputy Leader during this interim. | | | | | Jeff Seeney |
| 3 | Jeff Seeney | Callide | 2 April 2011 | 7 February 2015 | 3 years, 311 days | Campbell Newman |
| 4 | John-Paul Langbroek | Surfers Paradise | 2 April 2011 | 7 February 2015 | 3 years, 311 days | Lawrence Springborg |
| 5 | Deb Frecklington | Nanango | 6 May 2016 | 12 December 2017 | 1 year, 220 days | Tim Nicholls |
| 6 | Tim Mander | Everton | 12 December 2017 | 12 November 2020 | 1 year, 220 days | Deb Frecklington |
| 7 | David Janetzki | Toowoomba South | 12 November 2020 | 14 March 2022 | 1 year, 122 days | David Crisafulli |
| 8 | Jarrod Bleijie | Kawana | 14 March 2022 | Incumbent | 4 years, 249 days | David Crisafulli |

=== President ===
| No. | President | Portrait | Took office | Left office |
|---|---|---|---|---|
| 1 | Bruce McIver | | 26 July 2008 | 25 September 2015 |
| 2 | Gary Spence | | 22 November 2015 | 21 December 2018 |
| 3 | David Hutchinson | | December 2018 | 3 August 2020 |
| 4 | Cynthia Hardy | | 3 August 2020 | 24 July 2021 |
| 5 | Lawrence Springborg | | 24 July 2021 | Incumbent |

== See also ==
- Katter's Australian Party
- Clive Palmer
- Liberal–National party merger
- 2012 Queensland state election
- Young LNP – youth division of party
