= Electoral results for the district of Cunningham =

Queensland, Australia, district election results

This is a list of electoral results for the electoral district of Cunningham in Queensland state elections.

== Members for Cunningham ==
Member	Party	Term
William Allan	Unaligned	1888–1896
Thomas McGahan	Farmer's Representative	1896–1899
Francis Kates	Independent Ministerialist	1899–1903
Duncan Watson	Ministerialist	1903–1904
Francis Grayson	Ministerialist/Liberal/Independent/National	1904–1920
William Deacon	Country	1920–1943
Malcolm McIntyre	Country	1944–1953
Sir Alan Fletcher	Country	1953–1974
Tony Elliott	Country	1974–1975
Tony Elliott	National Country	1975–1982
Tony Elliott	National	1982–2001
Stuart Copeland	National	2001–2008
Stuart Copeland	Liberal National	2008–2009
Stuart Copeland	Independent	2009

== Election results ==
=== Elections in the 2000s ===
Results in the 2006 election were:

2006 Queensland state election: Cunningham
Party	Candidate	Votes	%	±%
National	Stuart Copeland	14,189	57.06	−5.28
Labor	Nick Holliday	7,027	28.26	−0.11
Family First	Peter Findlay	2,351	9.45	+9.45
Greens	Rian Muller	1,299	5.22	+5.22
Total formal votes		24,866	98.55	+0.12
Informal votes		367	1.45	−0.12
Turnout		25,233	92.15	−0.59
Two-party-preferred result
National	Stuart Copeland	15,500	66.43	−2.50
Labor	Nick Holliday	7,833	33.57	+2.50
National hold		Swing	−2.50	

2004 Queensland state election: Cunningham
Party	Candidate	Votes	%	±%
National	Stuart Copeland	14,890	62.34	+37.46
Labor	Daniel King	6,775	28.37	+3.38
One Nation	Peter Mace	2,220	9.29	−11.27
Total formal votes		23,885	98.43	−0.26
Informal votes		381	1.57	+0.26
Turnout		24,266	92.74	−0.71
Two-party-preferred result
National	Stuart Copeland	15,746	68.93	+10.30
Labor	Daniel King	7,096	31.07	−10.30
National hold		Swing	+10.30	

2001 Queensland state election: Cunningham
Party	Candidate	Votes	%	±%
Labor	Leeann King	5,686	25.0	+5.7
National	Stuart Copeland	5,661	24.9	−19.1
One Nation	David Drinan	4,700	20.7	−10.5
Liberal	Peter Rookas	3,368	14.8	+14.8
Independent	Ann Collins	2,834	12.5	+12.5
City Country Alliance	John Reynolds	502	2.2	+2.2
Total formal votes		22,751	98.7	
Informal votes		301	1.3	
Turnout		23,052	93.5	
Two-party-preferred result
National	Stuart Copeland	9,769	58.6	−11.1
Labor	Leeann King	6,893	41.4	+41.4
National hold		Swing	−11.1	

=== Elections in the 1990s ===
1998 Queensland state election: Cunningham
Party	Candidate	Votes	%	±%
National	Tony Elliott	10,384	43.2	−30.6
One Nation	Sherry Passfield	7,774	32.4	+32.4
Labor	Jackie Trad	4,535	18.9	−7.3
Independent	Ken Davies	605	2.5	+2.5
Independent	Anne Smeaton	399	1.7	+1.7
Reform	Bill Ison	324	1.4	+1.4
Total formal votes		24,021	98.8	+0.6
Informal votes		301	1.2	−0.6
Turnout		24,322	93.7	+1.3
Two-candidate-preferred result
National	Tony Elliott	12,507	58.8	−15.0
One Nation	Sherry Passfield	8,744	41.2	+41.2
National hold		Swing	−15.0	

1995 Queensland state election: Cunningham
Party	Candidate	Votes	%	±%
National	Tony Elliott	16,317	73.8	+16.5
Labor	David Cooper	5,792	26.2	−5.7
Total formal votes		22,109	98.2	+0.3
Informal votes		399	1.8	−0.3
Turnout		22,508	92.4	+0.2
National hold		Swing	+7.4	

1992 Queensland state election: Cunningham
Party	Candidate	Votes	%	±%
National	Tony Elliott	12,173	57.3	+10.2
Labor	David Cooper	6,778	31.9	+3.1
Liberal	Ted Radke	2,291	10.8	−9.8
Total formal votes		21,242	97.9	
Informal votes		459	2.1	
Turnout		21,701	92.2	
Two-party-preferred result
National	Tony Elliott	13,888	66.4	+1.0
Labor	David Cooper	7,036	33.6	−1.0
National hold		Swing	+1.0	

=== Elections in the 1980s ===
1989 Queensland state election: Cunningham
Party	Candidate	Votes	%	±%
National	Tony Elliott	7,376	51.1	−28.8
Liberal	Malcolm Wilson	3,742	25.9	+25.9
Labor	Noel Payne	3,309	22.9	+2.8
Total formal votes		14,427	97.7	+0.3
Informal votes		339	2.3	−0.3
Turnout		14,766	93.0	+0.3
Two-party-preferred result
National	Tony Elliott	10,330	71.6	−8.3
Labor	Noel Payne	4,097	28.4	+8.3
National hold		Swing	−8.3	

- The two party preferred vote was not counted between the National and Liberal candidates for Cunningham.

1986 Queensland state election: Cunningham
Party	Candidate	Votes	%	±%
National	Tony Elliott	10,321	79.9	+1.7
Labor	Paul Kerswell	2,589	20.1	−1.7
Total formal votes		12,910	97.4	
Informal votes		348	2.6	
Turnout		13,258	92.7	
National hold		Swing	+1.7	

1983 Queensland state election: Cunningham
Party	Candidate	Votes	%	±%
National	Tony Elliott	10,876	78.7	+8.0
Labor	Warren Keats	2,935	21.3	+5.3
Total formal votes		13,811	98.7	−0.7
Informal votes		183	1.3	+0.7
Turnout		13,994	93.8	+2.4
National hold		Swing	−1.6	

1980 Queensland state election: Cunningham
Party	Candidate	Votes	%	±%
National	Tony Elliott	8,989	70.7	−4.7
Labor	Robert Ball	2,038	16.0	+2.3
Liberal	Richard Barnard	1,679	13.2	+13.2
Total formal votes		12,706	99.4	+0.2
Informal votes		96	0.8	−0.2
Turnout		12,787	91.4	−2.0
Two-party-preferred result
National	Tony Elliott	10,206	80.3	−0.3
Labor	Robert Ball	2,500	19.7	+0.3
National hold		Swing	−0.3	

=== Elections in the 1970s ===
1977 Queensland state election: Cunningham
Party	Candidate	Votes	%	±%
National	Tony Elliott	9,132	75.4	+4.5
Labor	Trevor Peacock	1,655	13.7	+2.7
Democrats	Valerie O'Phee	1,328	11.0	+11.0
Total formal votes		12,115	99.2	
Informal votes		96	0.8	
Turnout		12,211	93.4	
Two-party-preferred result
National	Tony Elliott	9,769	80.6	−5.9
Labor	Trevor Peacock	2,346	19.4	+5.9
National hold		Swing	−5.9	

1974 Queensland state election: Cunningham
Party	Candidate	Votes	%	±%
National	Tony Elliott	8,096	70.9	+12.4
Liberal	Patrick Coonan	1,624	14.2	+14.2
Labor	Ronald Whittington	1,255	11.0	−10.1
Queensland Labor	Robert Barron	439	3.9	−16.6
Total formal votes		11,414	98.7	−0.6
Informal votes		152	1.3	+0.6
Turnout		11,566	93.8	−1.2
Two-party-preferred result
National	Tony Elliott	9,878	86.5	+10.1
Labor	Ronald Whittington	1,536	13.5	−10.1
National hold		Swing	+10.1	

- The two candidate preferred vote was not counted between the National and Liberal candidates for Cunningham.

1972 Queensland state election: Cunningham
Party	Candidate	Votes	%	±%
Country	Alan Fletcher	6,195	58.5	−0.6
Labor	Brian Graham	2,232	21.1	−7.8
Queensland Labor	Eugene Connolly	2,166	20.4	+8.4
Total formal votes		10,593	99.3	
Informal votes		70	0.7	
Turnout		10,663	95.0	
Two-party-preferred result
Country	Alan Fletcher	8,097	76.4	+3.8
Labor	Brian Graham	2,496	23.6	−3.8
Country hold		Swing	+3.8	

=== Elections in the 1960s ===
1969 Queensland state election: Cunningham
Party	Candidate	Votes	%	±%
Country	Alan Fletcher	4,340	59.1	−13.1
Labor	Nelson Mann	2,122	28.9	+12.5
Queensland Labor	Eugene Connolly	879	12.0	+0.6
Total formal votes		7,341	98.9	−0.4
Informal votes		81	1.1	+0.4
Turnout		7,422	95.6	−0.1
Two-party-preferred result
Country	Alan Fletcher	5,080	69.2	−11.3
Labor	Nelson Mann	2,261	30.8	+11.3
Country hold		Swing	−11.3	

1966 Queensland state election: Cunningham
Party	Candidate	Votes	%	±%
Country	Alan Fletcher	5,379	72.2	−0.6
Labor	Brian Davis	1,223	16.4	−4.5
Queensland Labor	Alexander Browne	847	11.4	+5.1
Total formal votes		7,449	99.3	+0.2
Informal votes		49	0.7	−0.2
Turnout		7,498	95.7	+1.0
Two-party-preferred result
Country	Alan Fletcher	5,994	80.5	+2.6
Labor	Brian Davis	1,455	19.5	−2.6
Country hold		Swing	+2.6	

1963 Queensland state election: Cunningham
Party	Candidate	Votes	%	±%
Country	Alan Fletcher	5,522	72.8	−27.2
Labor	Brian Davis	1,585	20.9	+20.9
Queensland Labor	Herbert Scott	474	6.3	+6.3
Total formal votes		7,581	99.1	
Informal votes		72	0.9	
Turnout		7,653	94.7	
Two-party-preferred result
Country	Alan Fletcher	5,908	77.9	−22.1
Labor	Brian Davis	1,673	22.1	+22.1
Country hold		Swing	−22.1	

1960 Queensland state election: Cunningham
Party	Candidate	Votes	%	±%
Country	Alan Fletcher	unopposed		
Country hold		Swing	N/A	

=== Elections in the 1950s ===
1957 Queensland state election: Cunningham
Party	Candidate	Votes	%	±%
Country	Alan Fletcher	7,054	67.0	+2.7
Independent	Leslie Ott	3,468	33.0	+33.0
Total formal votes		10,522	98.4	−0.9
Informal votes		175	1.6	+0.9
Turnout		10,697	96.4	+1.2
Country hold		Swing	+2.7	

1956 Queensland state election: Cunningham
Party	Candidate	Votes	%	±%
Country	Alan Fletcher	6,682	64.5	+3.5
Labor	John McCafferty	3,718	35.5	−3.5
Total formal votes		10,400	99.3	+0.1
Informal votes		73	0.7	−0.1
Turnout		10,473	95.2	+2.0
Country hold		Swing	+3.5	

1953 Queensland state election: Cunningham
Party	Candidate	Votes	%	±%
Country	Alan Fletcher	5,944	60.9	−39.1
Labor	Robert Bradfield	3,808	39.1	+39.1
Total formal votes		9,752	99.2	
Informal votes		78	0.8	
Turnout		9,830	93.2	
Country hold		Swing	N/A	

1950 Queensland state election: Cunningham
Party	Candidate	Votes	%	±%
Country	Malcolm McIntyre	unopposed		
Country hold		Swing		

=== Elections in the 1940s ===
1947 Queensland state election: Cunningham
Party	Candidate	Votes	%	±%
Country	Malcolm McIntyre	6,099	72.3	+5.1
Labor	John Hilton	2,336	27.7	−5.1
Total formal votes		8,435	99.1	+1.4
Informal votes		80	0.9	−1.4
Turnout		8,515	91.9	−0.2
Country hold		Swing	+5.1	

1944 Queensland state election: Cunningham
Party	Candidate	Votes	%	±%
Country	Malcolm McIntyre	5,542	67.2	+47.3
Labor	John Hilton	2,705	32.8	+0.1
Total formal votes		8,247	97.7	−1.5
Informal votes		192	2.3	+1.5
Turnout		8,439	92.1	0.0
Country gain from Independent		Swing	N/A	

1941 Queensland state election: Cunningham
Party	Candidate	Votes	%	±%
Independent Country	William Deacon	4,062	47.4	+47.4
Labor	John Hilton	2,806	32.7	+32.7
Country	Herbert Castles	1,704	19.9	−80.1
Total formal votes		8,572	99.2	
Informal votes		66	0.8	
Turnout		8,638	92.1	
Two-candidate-preferred result
Independent Country	William Deacon	5,492	65.8	−34.2
Labor	John Hilton	2,860	34.2	+34.2
Independent Country gain from Country		Swing	N/A	

=== Elections in the 1930s ===
1938 Queensland state election: Cunningham
Party	Candidate	Votes	%	±%
Country	William Deacon	unopposed		
Country hold		Swing		

1935 Queensland state election: Cunningham
Party	Candidate	Votes	%	±%
CPNP	William Deacon	unopposed		
CPNP hold		Swing		

1932 Queensland state election: Cunningham
Party	Candidate	Votes	%	±%
CPNP	William Deacon	4,767	66.8	
Labor	John Archibald	2,369	33.2	
Total formal votes		7,136	99.3	
Informal votes		51	0.7	
Turnout		7,187	92.3	
CPNP hold		Swing		

=== Elections in the 1920s ===
1929 Queensland state election: Cunningham
Party	Candidate	Votes	%	±%
CPNP	William Deacon	4,514	77.9	+8.8
Independent	Percy Bayley	1,282	22.1	+22.1
Total formal votes		5,796	99.0	−0.4
Informal votes		57	1.0	+0.4
Turnout		5,853	87.1	+1.9
CPNP hold		Swing	N/A	

1926 Queensland state election: Cunningham
Party	Candidate	Votes	%	±%
CPNP	William Deacon	3,974	69.1	+26.4
Labor	Edward Doyle	1,779	30.9	−5.2
Total formal votes		5,753	99.4	+1.6
Informal votes		32	0.6	−1.6
Turnout		5,785	85.2	−3.8
CPNP hold		Swing	+7.4	

1923 Queensland state election: Cunningham
Party	Candidate	Votes	%	±%
Country	William Deacon	2,481	42.8	−57.2
Labor	Denis Hannay	2,094	36.1	+36.1
Independent Country	James Roberts	1,229	21.2	+21.2
Total formal votes		5,804	97.8	
Informal votes		128	2.2	
Turnout		5,932	89.0	
Two-party-preferred result
Country	William Deacon	3,493	61.7	−38.3
Labor	Denis Hannay	2,166	38.3	+38.3
Country hold		Swing	N/A	

1920 Queensland state election: Cunningham
Party	Candidate	Votes	%	±%
Country	William Deacon	unopposed		
Country gain from Independent		Swing		

=== Elections in the 1910s ===
1918 Queensland state election: Cunningham
Party	Candidate	Votes	%	±%
Independent National	Francis Grayson	1,713	45.9	+45.9
Labor	John Moir	1,355	36.3	+36.3
National	James Purcell	662	17.7	−82.3
Total formal votes		3,730	97.6	
Informal votes		93	2.4	
Turnout		3,823	81.1	
Independent National gain from National		Swing	N/A	

1915 Queensland state election: Cunningham
Party	Candidate	Votes	%	±%
Liberal	Francis Grayson	unopposed		
Liberal hold		Swing		

1912 Queensland state election: Cunningham
Party	Candidate	Votes	%	±%
Liberal	Francis Grayson	2,049	75.7	
Labor	Percy McCawley	656	24.3	
Total formal votes		2,705	98.8	
Informal votes		33	1.2	
Turnout		2,738	67.0	
Liberal hold		Swing		
