= Electoral results for the district of Western Downs =

Queensland, Australia, district election results

This is a list of electoral results for the electoral district of Western Downs in Queensland state elections.

== Members for Western Downs ==
First incarnation (1860–1873, two members)
Member	Party	Term	Member	Party	Term
Thomas Moffatt	Unaligned	1860–1864	James Taylor	Unaligned	1860–1870
John Watts	Unaligned	1864–1867	James Taylor	Unaligned	1860–1870
Robert Ramsay	Unaligned	1867–1873	James Taylor	Unaligned	1860–1870
Robert Ramsay	Unaligned	1867–1873	Edward Wienholt	Unaligned	1870–1873

Second incarnation (1992–2001, one member)
Member	Party	Term
Brian Littleproud	National Party	1992–2001

== Election results ==
=== Elections in the 1990s ===
1998 Queensland state election: Western Downs
Party	Candidate	Votes	%	±%
National	Brian Littleproud	9,864	48.17	−31.24
One Nation	Peter McLaren	7,068	34.52	+34.52
Labor	Ron Lockwood	3,544	17.31	−3.28
Total formal votes		20,476	98.95	+0.19
Informal votes		217	1.05	−0.19
Turnout		20,693	94.34	+0.46
Two-candidate-preferred result
National	Brian Littleproud	11,428	59.42	−19.99
One Nation	Peter McLaren	7,805	40.58	+40.58
National hold		Swing	−19.99	

1995 Queensland state election: Western Downs
Party	Candidate	Votes	%	±%
National	Brian Littleproud	16,120	79.41	+12.37
Labor	Brad Wood	4,180	20.59	+0.50
Total formal votes		20,300	98.76	+0.20
Informal votes		254	1.24	−0.20
Turnout		20,554	93.88	+0.24
National hold		Swing	+2.79	

1992 Queensland state election: Western Downs
Party	Candidate	Votes	%	±%
National	Brian Littleproud	14,060	67.0	−6.1
Labor	Anne Jones	4,214	20.1	−5.0
Independent	Lorraine Wheelson	2,435	11.6	+11.6
Independent	James Clarke	265	1.3	+1.3
Total formal votes		20,974	98.6	
Informal votes		307	1.4	
Turnout		21,281	93.6	
Two-party-preferred result
National	Brian Littleproud	14,856	76.6	+2.1
Labor	Anne Jones	4,532	23.4	−2.1
National hold		Swing	+2.1	
