= Electoral results for the district of Darling Downs (Queensland) =

Queensland, Australia, district election results

This is a list of electoral results for the electoral district of Darling Downs in Queensland state elections.

== Members for Darling Downs ==
=== First incarnation (1873–1888) ===
==== Single member electorate (1873–1878) ====
Member	Party	Term
Edward Wienholt	Unaligned	1873–1875
William Graham	Unaligned	1875–1878

==== Dual member electorate (1878–1888) ====
Member	Party	Term	Member	Party	Term
William Miles	Oppositionist	1878–1887	Francis Kates	Ministerialist	1878–1881
William Miles	Oppositionist	1878–1887	William Allan	Nationalist	1881–1883
William Miles	Oppositionist	1878–1887	Francis Kates	Ministerialist	1883–1888
William Allan	Nationalist	1887–1888	Francis Kates	Ministerialist	1883–1888

=== Second incarnation ===
Member	Party	Term
Ray Hopper	Independent	2001
Ray Hopper	National	2001–2008
Ray Hopper	Liberal National	2008–2009

== Election results ==
=== Elections in the 2000s ===
==== 2006 ====
2006 Queensland state election: Darling Downs
Party	Candidate	Votes	%	±%
National	Ray Hopper	13,883	59.54	+9.02
Labor	David Nelson	6,161	26.42	+3.02
Family First	David Totenhofer	3,273	14.04	+14.04
Total formal votes		23,317	97.94	−0.32
Informal votes		490	2.06	+0.32
Turnout		23,807	93.08	−1.10
Two-party-preferred result
National	Ray Hopper	15,218	69.14	+1.37
Labor	David Nelson	6,794	30.86	−1.37
National hold		Swing	+1.37	

==== 2004 ====
2004 Queensland state election: Darling Downs
Party	Candidate	Votes	%	±%
National	Ray Hopper	11,671	50.5	+11.5
Labor	Annette Frizzell	5,407	23.4	+2.5
Independent	Bruce Chalmers	2,448	10.6	+10.6
One Nation	David Hoy	1,902	8.2	+8.2
Independent	Kathy Sankey	1,674	7.3	+7.3
Total formal votes		23,102	98.3	−0.0
Informal votes		410	1.7	+0.0
Turnout		23,512	94.2	−0.4
Two-party-preferred result
National	Ray Hopper	13,329	67.9	+18.9
Labor	Annette Frizzell	6,338	32.2	+32.2
National gain from Independent		Swing	N/A	

==== 2001 ====
2001 Queensland state election: Darling Downs
Party	Candidate	Votes	%	±%
Independent	Ray Hopper	9,069	40.0	+40.0
National	Peter Taylor	8,855	39.1	−5.6
Labor	John Martin	4,749	20.9	+6.0
Total formal votes		22,673	98.3	
Informal votes		400	1.7	
Turnout		23,073	94.6	
Two-candidate-preferred result
Independent	Ray Hopper	9,651	51.1	+51.1
National	Peter Taylor	9,226	48.9	−6.4
Independent gain from National		Swing	+51.1	
