= Wienholt =

Wienholt is a surname. Notable people with the surname include:

- Anne Wienholt (1920–2018), Australian artist
- Arnold Wienholt Sr. (1826–1895), Australian politician from Queensland
- Arnold Wienholt (1877–1940), Australian grazier, author and politician
- Edward Wienholt (1833–1904), Australian politician from Queensland
- Louis Wienholt (1918–1973), Australian public servant
