= Braeside =

Braeside, meaning hillside in the Scots language, may refer to:

- Braeside, Aberdeen, Scotland
- Braeside, Greenock, Scotland
- Braeside, Victoria, Australia
- Braeside, Ontario, Canada
- Braeside Observatory, Flagstaff, Arizona
- Breaside, Chicago, Illinois
- Braeside, Calgary, a neighbourhood in Calgary, Alberta, Canada
- Braeside Homestead, a heritage-listed homestead in Queensland, Australia
- The Edith Marion Patch House, a historic building in Old Town, Maine
- A district of Harare, Zimbabwe
