= Maziua raid =

Military colonial clash in Mozambique

- Part of the East African Campaign (World War I)
Date	24 August 1914 (Note: According to Edward Paice and Fernando Amado Couto the attack took place on 24 August, while Robert Gaudi stated that Maziua was destroyed before 14 August.)
Location	Maziua, Niassa Province, Portuguese Mozambique 11°39′4″S 36°46′12″E
Result	German victory

Belligerents
German Empire: German East Africa	Portugal: Portuguese Mozambique

Commanders and leaders
Wolfgang Weck	Eduardo Costa †

Units involved
Schutztruppe detachment	Niassa Company police detachment

Casualties and losses
Unknown	10–13 killed
- Location within Mozambique Maziua raid (Africa)

The Maziua raid was an armed clash between German and Portuguese colonial troops in Mozambique on 24 August 1914 during World War I. Though the two countries were officially at peace, German soldiers carried out a cross-border raid into Portuguese Mozambique for unclear reasons, and destroyed the outpost of Maziua. The Portuguese soldiers killed in the raid were the first Portuguese casualties of World War I.

== Background ==
Following the outbreak of World War I on 28 July 1914, tensions rose in the European colonies of eastern Africa, particularly in the border regions of German East Africa (modern-day Tanzania). News about the conflict in Europe spread slowly in some of the more remote parts of the African colonies, resulting in confusion about which country was at war with whom.

The boma (fort) of Maziua in northern Mozambique, a colony of neutral Portugal, was probably not informed at all about the start of World War I. Maziua was held by a small police detachment of the Niassa Company, and commanded by Sgt. Eduardo Costa of the Portuguese Armed Forces' medical service.

== The raid ==
In the night of 23 August 1914, German askari led by staff surgeon Dr. Wolfgang Weck crossed the Ruvuma River which marked the border of German East Africa to Mozambique. They then advanced on Maziua. Weck later claimed that he had been conducting a survey on the sleeping sickness in nearby Sassawala, and had not been informed on the war's outbreak. Instead, he had allegedly thought that Maziua had been captured by native rebels, prompting his attack. Weck's account of the events was doubted by contemporaries and historians. Some have even theorized that the raid was part of some kind of conspiracy. Portuguese historian Fernando Amado Couto considered it more likely that Weck was simply motivated by a desire for martial glory. According to other sources, Weck believed that Portugal had declared war on Germany.

In any case, the German force surprised Costa's men on early 24 August, and quickly overwhelmed them. Most of the garrison was killed. Besides Costa, nine to twelve Portuguese askari fell in combat. They were the first Portuguese casualties of World War I. Before retreating back into German East Africa, Weck's soldiers burned Maziua to the ground, while leaving the dead unburied.

== Aftermath ==
Due to Maziua's extreme remoteness, news about the raid only reached the Mozambiquan capital Lourenço Marques four months later, on 15 December 1914. The attack caused a diplomatic scandal, and the Portuguese government accused Germany of aggressive warmongering. The German central government accepted full responsibility, and offered an official apology. Meanwhile, Paul von Lettow-Vorbeck, commander of the German Schutztruppe, concentrated more troops along the Mozambiquan border. He moved one company of regular colonial troops and 800 Angoni Ruga-Ruga auxiliaries to the area to dissuade the Portuguese from carrying out reprisals. Tensions remained high due to the raid, and Weck became "infamous" for his actions. Soon after his raid against Maziua, Weck again violated Portuguese neutrality to capture the South African hunter Piet Pretorius who camped south of the Ruvuma, though Pretorius managed to escape.

Though military clashes between German and Portuguese soldiers continued in Africa from 1914 to 1915, most notably in Angola, Portugal officially remained neutral until 1916. It then entered the war on the side of the Allies, and took part in the fighting in German East Africa. Portuguese forces suffered heavy losses in the East African campaign, and northern Mozambique was devastated by a German invasion in the war's latter stages. In 1928, the Portuguese government officially demanded monetary reparations from the Weimar Republic for the attack on Maziua, namely 275,000 Reichsmark.

== See also ==
- Portuguese campaign in Mozambique (World War I)
