= Archibald William Butterworth =

British colonial police officer

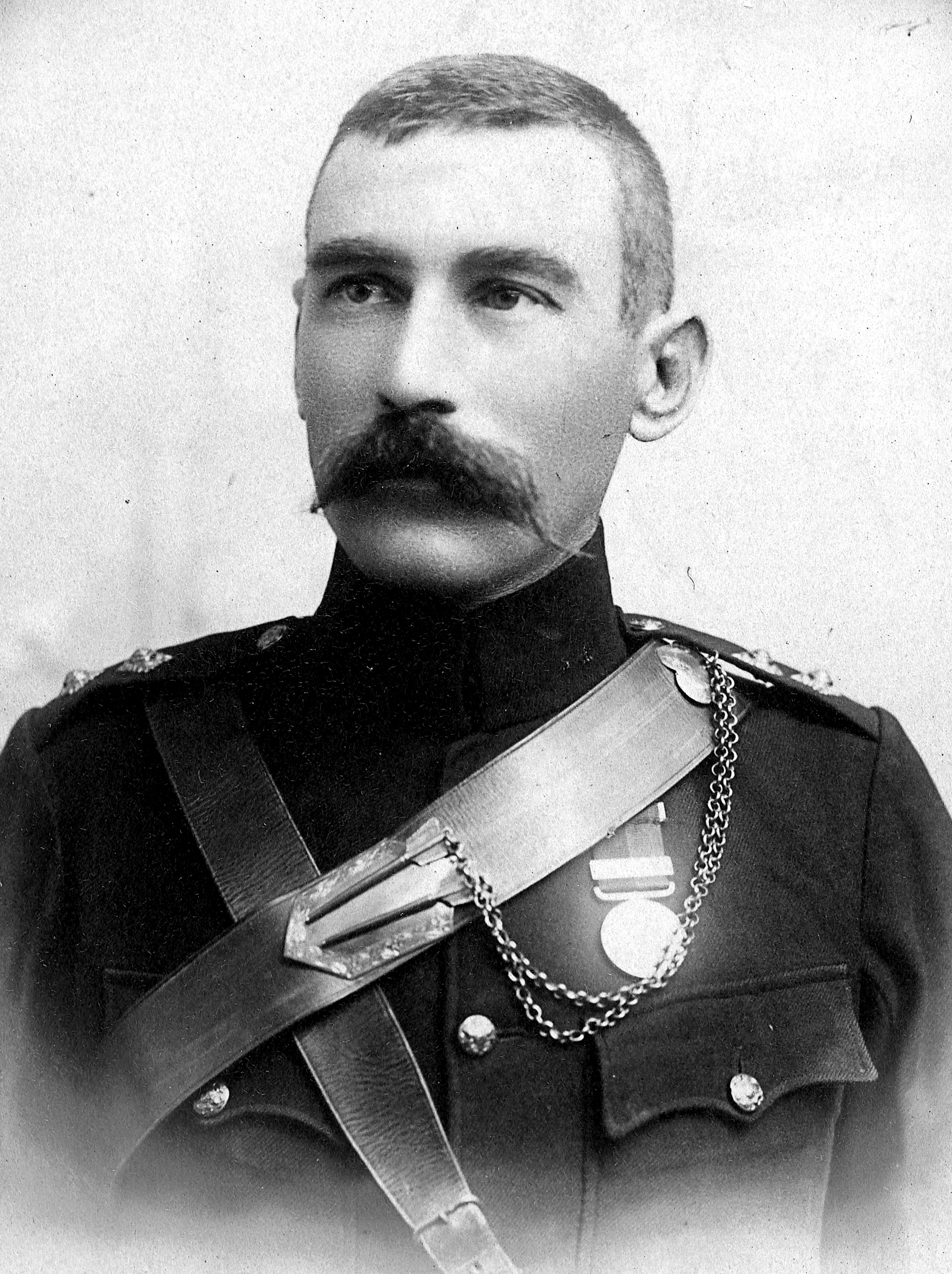
- Born: June 1866; Whitechapel, United Kingdom
- Died: 22 February 1942 (aged 75); Ryde, Isle of Wight, United Kingdom
- Occupations: Mercantile marine, police officer, explorer, soldier, civil servant
- Spouse: Greta Gabrielle Butterworth

Archibald William Butterworth (June 1866 – 22 February 1942) was a British police officer and soldier who served as the Commandant of the New Guinea Armed Constabulary between 1892 and 1901.

== Early life ==
Butterworth was born in Whitechapel in 1866 to Frederick and Mary Butterworth. He had a twin sister named Susanna and two brothers. His father was a quartermaster in 2nd Battalion of Scots Guards. He was educated at Mercers’ School, City of London. In his early life he spent four years at sea before emigrating to Australia.

== Queensland and British New Guinea ==
On 25 June 1887, he was sworn in as an officer of the Queensland Mounted Police and in early 1888 was appointed as a Constable in Beenleigh. While stationed there he joined the Beenleigh Rifle Club and competed in shooting competitions, as well as cricket matches.

In October 1890 he was appointed as the Government Storekeeper in the British New Guinea Civil Service at an annual salary of £200 and in the following year he was appointed as an officer in the Armed Constabulary. He continued to work various other provisional positions within the civil service until he was appointed as the Commandant of the Armed Constabulary in 1892.

During his tenure as Commandant, he took part in various punitive expeditions against tribes that either challenged or were not aware of the government's authority, and was awarded the unique Tugeri Medal for the role he and his men played in defeating the Marind-Anim headhunters from Dutch New Guinea.

== Later life ==
Following the outbreak of the Second Boer War, Butterworth returned to Brisbane and enlisted in the Queensland Imperial Bushmen as a Lieutenant. In early 1901 he was invalidated to England and later that year joined the Royal West African Frontier Force where he later fought in the Anglo-Aro War and the Kamerun campaign.

In 1904 he transferred to the Political Service of Nigeria, being appointed district commissioner of the Ijebu Province, and he was promoted commissioner and president in 1914.

He later settled in the Isle of Wight where he was a member of the Royal Victoria Y.C. and lived until his death in 1942 He was survived by his wife and five children.
