= Arnold Wienholt =

Australian politician

Arnold Wienholt DSO, MC and Bar
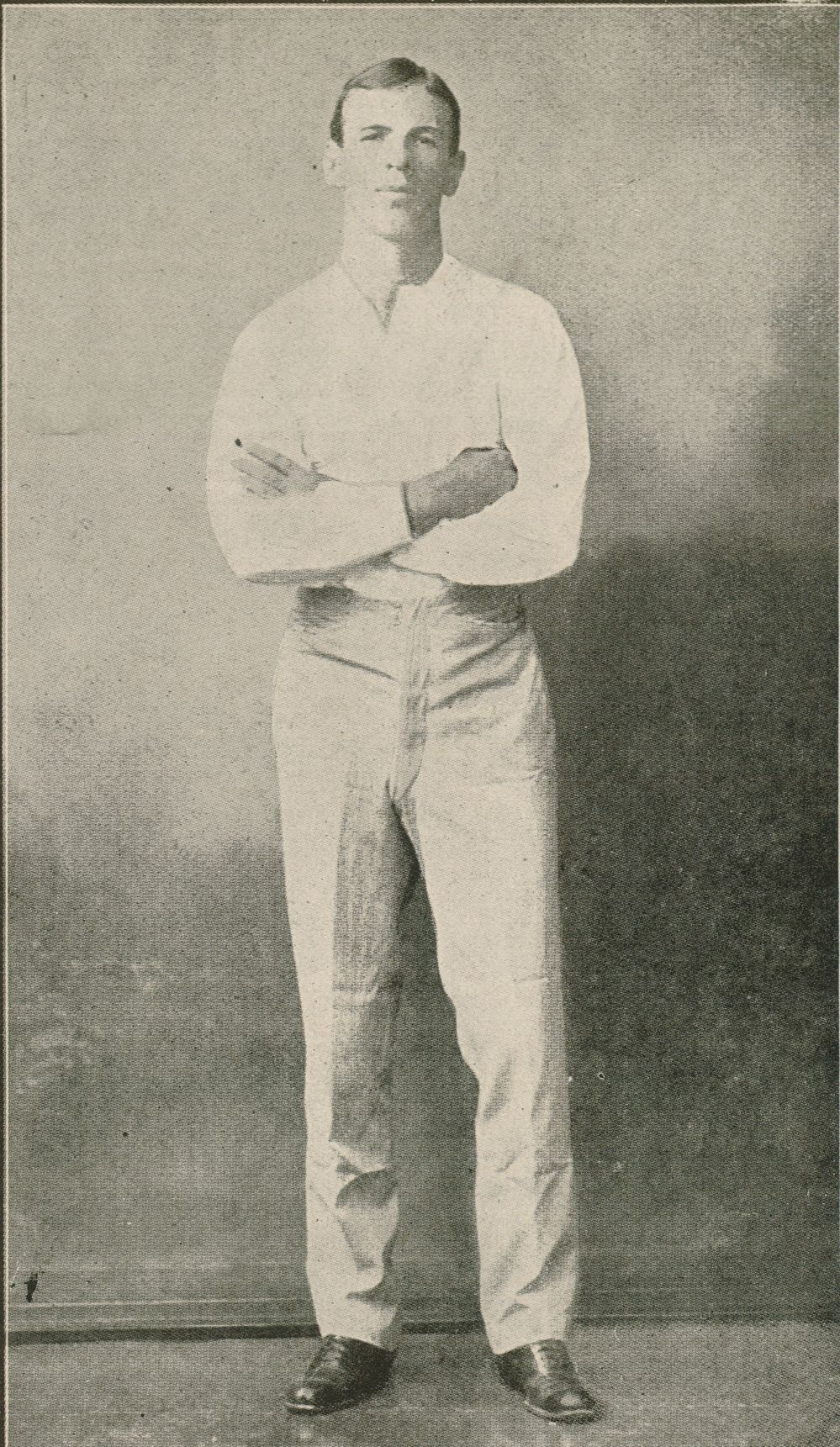
- Arnold Wienholt, circa 1916

Member of the Australian Parliament for Moreton
- In office 13 December 1919 – 6 November 1922
- Preceded by: Hugh Sinclair
- Succeeded by: Josiah Francis

Member of the Queensland Legislative Assembly for Fassifern
- In office 2 October 1909 – 28 March 1913
- Preceded by: Charles Moffatt Jenkinson
- Succeeded by: Ernest Bell
- In office 28 June 1930 – 11 May 1935
- Preceded by: Ernest Bell
- Succeeded by: Adolf Muller

Personal details
- Born: 25 November 1877 Goomburra, Queensland
- Died: 10 September 1940 (aged 62) Abyssinia
- Cause of death: Killed in action
- Resting place: Unknown
- Party: Nationalist Party of Australia, Ministerial
- Spouse: Enid Frances Sydney Jones
- Relations: Anne Wienholt (daughter); Edward Wienholt (father); Arnold Wienholt Sr. (uncle); Arnold Hodson (2nd Cousin)
- Children: Anne Wienholt
- Education: Eton College
- Occupation: Grazier, soldier, politician, author, big-game hunter.

Military service
- Allegiance: British Empire
- Branch/service: Queensland Imperial Bushmen (1900-1901); British South Africa Police (1915); East African Mounted Rifles (1916); East Africa Intelligence Department (1916-1918); Ethiopia Red Cross (1935-1936); British Army (1939-1940)
- Years of service: 1900-1901, 1915-1918, 1935-36, 1939-1940
- Rank: Captain
- Battles/wars: Second Boer War: First World War; African theatre of World War I; South West Africa Campaign; German Campaign in Angola; East African Campaign; Battle of Kahe; Portuguese campaign in Mozambique (World War I); Second Italo-Ethiopian War; Second World War; East African Campaign; Gideon Force
- Awards: Distinguished Service Order; Military Cross and Bar; Mentioned in Dispatches

Arnold Wienholt (25 November 1877 – 10 September 1940) was an Australian grazier, soldier, author and politician. He was a Member of the Queensland Legislative Assembly and a Member of the Australian House of Representatives.

== Early life ==
Arnold Wienholt was born on 25 November 1877 at Goomburra, Queensland, the son of Edward Wienholt (a Member of the Queensland Legislative Assembly) and his wife Ellen (née Williams) and nephew of Arnold Wienholt Sr. He was educated in England at Wixenford School and Eton College before returning to Australia as a grazier on the Darling Downs. In 1908 he became the manager of the Wienholt Estates Company of Australiaisa Ltd and was responsible for all the firms properties in Queensland including Jondaryan Homestead and Fassifern Homestead

== Second Boer War ==
He joined the 4th Queensland Imperial Bushmen Regiment on the 18th May 1900; and served in South Africa and was promoted to sergeant, and returned to Brisbane on the 10th August 1901 He was awarded Queen's South Africa Medal with two clasps for Orange Free State and Transvaal.

== World War I ==
In March 1915 he elisted in the border patrol as a Special Service Trooper in the British South African Police, and served in South West Africa Campaign assisting the Portuguese in the German Campaign in Angola and was awarded Mentioned in Dispatches by Lord Buxton, the High Commissioner of South Africa. In 1916, he enlisted with the East African Mounted Rifles and involved in the advance of the British 1st Division and the Battle of Kahe. Then joined the East Africa Intelligence Department, he was promoted to Warrant Officer 1st Class. In June 1916, while leading a patrol in German East Africa, he was wounded and taken prisoner for six months until he escaped in January 1917 and marched 15 days to get back to British territory and was awarded a Military Cross.

Military Cross citation reads:

'For conspicuous gallantry and endurance as leader of a patrol. The patrol covered some 200 odd miles of the most difficult country and obtained valuable information. He was subsequently separated from his patrol, severely wounded and captured by the enemy. He ultimately escaped, and made his way back to our lines across 100 miles of unknown bush.'

After several months of hospitalisation he was back on duty in July 1917. After several contacts and German prisoners taken he was a awarded a Bar to his Military Cross.

Arnold was given a commission as a Lieutenant and commanded a group of 40 Intelligence Scouts on a six month reconnaissance mission in the Portuguese campaign in Mozambique. He was awarded a Distinguished Service Order and promoted to Captain in late 1918. He was also awarded the 1914-1915 Star, British War Medal and Victory Medal.

Distinguished Service Order citation reads:

‘For continuous gallant conduct and endurance under trying circumstances during a period of six months in the bush. He performed an arduous march, during which his party were attacked more than once by superior opponent forces, through the unknown country which he had to reconnoitre and report on; and finally succeeded in gaining touch with a column as ordered. He performed many other reconnaissances during which he had several encounters with the opponents, and furnished valuable information with regard to their movements. Throughout he showed great courage and endurance, and rendered valuable service’.

== Politics ==
In 1909, he was elected to the Legislative Assembly of Queensland as the member for Fassifern, where he remained until 1913. In 1919, he was elected to the Australian House of Representatives as the Nationalist member for Moreton; he was also endorsed by the Primary Producers Union, effectively the Queensland state Country Party. Although sympathetic to the Country Party, formed in 1920, he remained a Nationalist, although the Country Party often received his support. He retired in 1922. In 1930 he returned to the Queensland Legislative Assembly as the member for Fassifern, where he remained until 1935.

== Personal life ==
In 1919, he married Enid Frances Sydney Jones they had one daughter, the artist Anne Wienholt 1920-2018

== Second Italo-Ethiopian War ==
Wienholt become a war correspondent for the Brisbane Courier Mail in Addis Ababa in Ethiopia in 1935. He joined the Ethiopia Red Cross as transport officer and left for the front line in the Second Italo-Ethiopian War.

== World War II ==
He worked for the British Army in 1940, as a civilian adviser, his commission as a Second Lieutenant only arrived after his death. He joined the Military Mission 101 unit in Ethiopia, part of the Gideon Force, as their Mission Intelligence Officer, he led the third Operational Centre across the border. He was killed in action in Abyssinia on 10 September 1940. Awarded 1939-1945 Star, Africa Star and War Medal.

== Memorialised ==
He is memorialised at the Khartoum Memorial - listed on Panel 2 (final resting place unknown). the Ballarat Australian Ex-Prisoners of War Memorial Brisbane Queensland Parliament War Service Honour Board. Commemorative Roll at the Australian War Memorial, Canberra. Wienholt Street in Sherwood, Brisbane, was created as an Avenue of Honour.

== Published works ==
- Wienholt, Arnold (1909), The tick trouble : with an attempted solution, A. Wienholt
- Wienholt, Arnold (1922), The story of a lion hunt : with some of the hunter's military adventures during the war, Andrew Melose — available online
- Wienholt, Arnold (1923), The work of a scout, Andrew Melrose
- Wienholt, Arnold; Thomas Leiper Kane Collection (Library of Congress. Hebraic Section) (1938), The Africans' last stronghold in Naboth's vineyard, J. Long

Parliament of Australia
Preceded by Hugh Sinclair	Member for Moreton; 1919–1922	Succeeded by Josiah Francis
Parliament of Queensland
Preceded by Charles Moffatt Jenkinson	Member for Fassifern; 1909–1913	Succeeded by Ernest Bell
Preceded by Ernest Bell	Member for Fassifern; 1930–1935	Succeeded by Adolf Muller
