= Electoral district of Darling Downs (Queensland) =

Coordinates: 27.4382°S 151.719°E

Darling Downs Queensland—Legislative Assembly
- State: Queensland
- Dates current: 1873–1888; 2001–2009
- Namesake: Darling Downs

Darling Downs was an electoral district of the Legislative Assembly in the Australian state of Queensland. It was named for the Darling Downs region.

The district covered rural areas in southern Queensland to the immediate west and north of Toowoomba, not including the city itself. Darling Downs included the towns of Dalby, Oakey and Crows Nest. The electorate was first created for the 2001 election.

In 2008, Darling Downs was abolished – with effect at the 2009 election – following a redistribution undertaken by the Electoral Commission of Queensland. Its former territory and voters were divided between the districts of Warrego, Nanango, Toowoomba North and a new seat called Condamine.

An earlier district based in the same region was also called Darling Downs. It existed as a single member electorate from 1873 to 1878 and as a dual member electorate from 1878 to 1888.

== Members for Darling Downs ==
=== First incarnation (1873–1888) ===
==== Single member electorate (1873–1878) ====
| Image | Member | Party | Term | Notes |
|---|---|---|---|---|
| | Edward Wienholt | Ministerialist | 4 November 1873 – 1 February 1875 | Resigned so he could travel to Europe |
| | William Graham | Unaligned | 23 March 1875 – 26 November 1878 | Won by-election. Did not contest 1878 election |

==== Two-member electorate (1878–1888) ====
| Image | Member | Party | Term | Notes | Image | Member | Party | Term | Notes |
|---|---|---|---|---|---|---|---|---|---|
| | William Miles | Oppositionist | 26 November 1878 – 22 August 1887 | Died in office | | Francis Kates | Ministerialist | 26 November 1878 – 1 November 1881 | Resigned |
| | William Miles | Oppositionist | 26 November 1878 – 22 August 1887 | Died in office | | William Allan | Conservative | 29 November 1881 – 1 October 1883 | Won by-election. Did not contest 1883 election |
| | William Miles | Oppositionist | 26 November 1878 – 22 August 1887 | Died in office | | Francis Kates | Ministerialist | 1 October 1883 – 4 May 1888 | |
| | William Allan | Conservative | 6 September 1887 – 4 May 1888 | Won by-election | | Francis Kates | Ministerialist | 1 October 1883 – 4 May 1888 | |

=== Second incarnation (2001–2009) ===
| Image | Member | Party | Term | Notes |
|---|---|---|---|---|
| | Ray Hopper | Independent | 17 February 2001 – December 2001 | Joined National Party and later its successor, the Liberal National Party. Moved to Condamine after Darling Downs was abolished |
| | Ray Hopper | National | December 2001 – 26 July 2008 | Joined National Party and later its successor, the Liberal National Party. Moved to Condamine after Darling Downs was abolished |
| | Ray Hopper | Liberal National | 26 July 2008 – 21 March 2009 | Joined National Party and later its successor, the Liberal National Party. Moved to Condamine after Darling Downs was abolished |

== See also ==
- Division of Darling Downs
- Electoral district of Darling Downs (New South Wales)
- Electoral districts of Queensland
- Members of the Queensland Legislative Assembly by year
- Category:Members of the Queensland Legislative Assembly by name
