= Francis Benjamin Kates =

Australian politician

Francis Kates
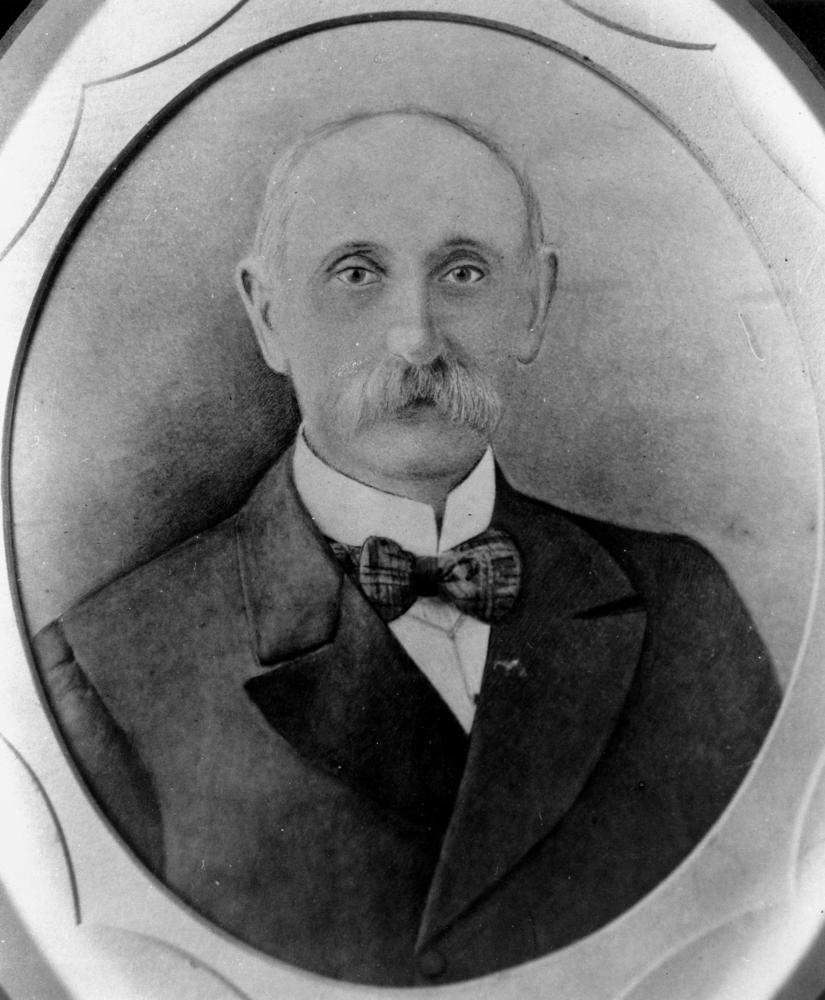

Member of the Queensland Legislative Assembly for Darling Downs
- In office 26 November 1878 – 1 November 1881 Serving with William Miles
- Preceded by: William Graham
- Succeeded by: William Allan
- In office 1 October 1883 – 4 May 1888 Serving with William Allan
- Preceded by: William Allan
- Succeeded by: Seat abolished

Member of the Queensland Legislative Assembly for Cunningham
- In office 11 March 1899 – 26 September 1903
- Preceded by: Thomas McGahan
- Succeeded by: Duncan Watson

Personal details
- Born: Francis Benjamin Kates; 1 July 1830 Berlin, Prussia
- Died: 26 September 1903 (aged 73) Dalveen, Queensland, Australia
- Resting place: Strath Elbess Cemetery, Dalveen
- Party: Independent
- Other political affiliations: Ministerial
- Spouse: Sarah Matthews (m.1858 d.1904)
- Occupation: Flour mill owner

Francis Benjamin Kates was a politician in Queensland, Australia. He was a Member of the Queensland Legislative Assembly. He was the Member for Darling Downs from 26 November 1878 until 1 November 1881, and from 1 October 1883 until 4 May 1888. He was the Independent Member for Cunningham from 11 March 1899 until his death on 26 September 1903.

He was born on 1 July 1830 in Berlin, Prussia, the son of Benjamin Kates and his wife, Henrietta. He married Sarah Matthews in London in 1858. He had two sons and a daughter.

Parliament of Queensland
Preceded by William Graham	Member for Darling Downs; 1878–1881; Served alongside: William Miles	Succeeded by William Allan
Preceded by William Allan	Member for Darling Downs; 1883–1888; Served alongside: William Allan	Abolished
Preceded by Thomas McGahan	Member for Cunningham; 1899–1903	Succeeded by Duncan Watson
