= Braeside Observatory =

Astronomy observatory in northern Arizona

- Organization: Arizona State University
- Location: Flagstaff, Coconino County, Arizona
- Coordinates: 35°11′30″N 111°44′53″W
- Altitude: 7,060 ft (2,150 m)
- Established: 1976

Telescopes
- The Braeside Cassegrain Telescope: 16" reflector, computer controlled
- Location of Braeside Observatory

Braeside Observatory is a privately owned astronomical observatory previously owned and operated by Arizona State University. It is located five miles west of Flagstaff, Arizona (US), near the U.S. Naval observatory. The observatory is made up of two buildings, the telescope building and the control building. The telescope building is where the observatory's 16" Cassegrain Reflector telescope is housed. The telescope is controlled from either the control building or from the university through computer controls.

== History ==
The observatory was founded in 1976 by Robert Fried, a retired Delta Air Lines captain, after a chance meeting with Sir Patrick Moore inspired him to turn his astronomical hobby into something more concrete. The observatory was set up as a private operating foundation. After Mr. Fried's death in 2003, the university committed itself to keeping the observatory open as an educational and research facility.

In Spring 2010, the Braeside Observatory dome and telescope were sold to an out-of-state buyer, who removed the observatory from its Flagstaff home. Braeside Observatory thus no longer exists.

== See also ==
- List of observatories
