= James Taylor (Queensland politician) =

Australian politician

The Honourable James Taylor
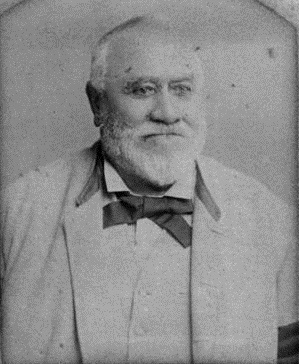

Member of the Queensland Legislative Assembly for Western Downs
- In office 27 April 1860 – 14 September 1870 Serving with Thomas Moffatt, John Watts, Robert Ramsay
- Preceded by: New seat
- Succeeded by: Edward Wienholt

Member of the Queensland Legislative Council
- In office 4 November 1871 – 10 January 1881
- In office 1 July 1881 – 17 August 1893

Personal details
- Born: James Taylor; 1820 London, England
- Died: 1895 (aged 74–75) Toowoomba, Queensland, Australia
- Resting place: Drayton and Toowoomba Cemetery
- Spouse: Sarah Boulton (m.1850 d.1908)
- Occupation: Grazier, Squatter

James Taylor (1820 – 19 October 1895) was a member of the Queensland Legislative Council and the Queensland Legislative Assembly.

== Early life and pastoral career ==
Taylor was born in London, England, in 1820 to John William Taylor, a merchant, and his wife Ann (née Fielder).

He probably arrived in Sydney on board the James Pattison and spent the next few years gaining pastoral experience before heading to the Darling Downs with sheep in 1848. He found work in Cecil Plains, becoming Henry Stuart Russell's head stockman before becoming a partner in 1856 and sole owner in 1859.

Using the property as a fattening and disposal centre for western sheep, he began to prosper, and by 1880, the 147,310-acre freehold property held almost 100,000 sheep. It was supplemented by Dunmore, Goodar and Coomrith stations on the Western Downs and Mount Marlow on the Barcoo River.

== Political career ==
Taylor was elected to the first Queensland Parliament in 1860, winning the seat of Western Downs. Appointed Secretary for Public Lands in 1869, he administered his office with little regard for the good of the public. Taylor withheld large areas of Cecil Plains from selection until 1870, when he sold them to himself. These actions were one of the reasons for his resignation as Secretary in May 1870, and in September of that same year, he resigned as a member of Western Downs to stand for the seat of Drayton and Toowoomba but was unsuccessful.

He was short in politics before he was appointed a member of the Queensland Legislative Council in November 1871, when he proved to be one of the squatting rearguard's most vigorous and obstructive members. He resigned after almost ten years of service in January 1881 to once again stand for the seat of Drayton and Toowoomba but was once again unsuccessful. He was reappointed to the Queensland Legislative Council in July 1881 and served until his retirement due to ill health in August 1893.

He also served on the Toowoomba Town Council, Mayor of Toowoomba in 1890.

== Business life ==
Taylor was a director of several companies, including the Queensland Mercantile and Agency Co, the Land Bank of Queensland, and the Queensland Brewing Co.

He was also a trustee for the Queensland Turf Club, the Toowoomba School of Arts, the Royal Agricultural Society, and the Queensland Club.

== Personal life ==
In April 1850, Taylor married Sarah Boulton in Drayton, and they had nine children together. Known as the King of Toowoomba he died at his home, Clifford House in Toowoomba, in 1895 and was buried in Drayton and Toowoomba Cemetery.

== Legacy ==
His home, Clifford House, was listed on the Queensland Heritage Register in 1992.

Parliament of Queensland
New seat	Member for Western Downs; 1860–1870; Served alongside: Thomas Moffatt, John Watts, Robert Ramsay	Succeeded by Edward Wienholt
