= Anne Wienholt =

Australian artist (1920–2018)

- Born: 10 April 1920; Leura, New South Wales
- Died: 27 March 2018 (aged 97); San Rafael, California
- Known for: Printmaking, sculpture, painting
- Website: annewienholt.org

Anne Wienholt (1920–2018) was an Australian artist known for her printmaking, sculpture, and painting.

== Biography ==
Wienholt was born in Leura, New South Wales on 10 April 1920. The daughter of Arnold Wienholt. She completed her secondary education as a boarder at Frensham School in Mittagong and then attended East Sydney Technical College from 1938 through 1941 where she was taught by William Dobell and Frank Medworth.

In the early 1940s Wienholt exhibited at the Macquarie Galleries and the Victoria Contemporary Art Society Show. She was also associated with the Merioola Group.

Wienholt was the recipient of the New South Wales Travelling Art Scholarship in 1944, which she used to travel to New York City, first studying at the Art Students League of New York with Yasuo Kuniyoshi, then at Atelier 17. In 1948, 1949, and 1950 she participated in the Brooklyn Museum's National Print Annual Exhibition.

In 1948, she married Masato Takashige, a Japanese born cabinetmaker. The couple lived in Marin County, California, but spent 1968–1970 in Kingston, Jamaica where she taught at the Jamaican School of Art.

Wienholt died in San Rafael, California on 27 March 2018. In 2019 a retrospective of her work was held at the College of Marin Fine Arts Gallery. Her work is in the collection of the National Gallery of Australia and the Art Gallery of New South Wales.
