= Electoral district of Western Downs =

Former state electoral district of Queensland, Australia

Western Downs Queensland—Legislative Assembly
- State: Queensland
- Dates current: 1860-1873, 1992-2001
- Namesake: Darling Downs

Western Downs refers to two incarnations of an electoral district of the Legislative Assembly in the Australian state of Queensland, based in the western part of the Darling Downs.

The original district existed from 1860 to 1873 and elected two members. More recently, Western Downs was a single member electorate that was first contested in 1992 and abolished in 2001.

== Members for Western Downs ==
First incarnation (1860–1873, two members)
| Member | Party | Term | Member | Party | Term |
|---|---|---|---|---|---|
| Thomas Moffatt | Unaligned | 1860–1864 | James Taylor | Unaligned | 1860–1870 |
| John Watts | Unaligned | 1864–1867 | James Taylor | Unaligned | 1860–1870 |
| Robert Ramsay | Unaligned | 1867–1873 | James Taylor | Unaligned | 1860–1870 |
| Robert Ramsay | Unaligned | 1867–1873 | Edward Wienholt | Unaligned | 1870–1873 |

Second incarnation (1992–2001, one member)
| Member | Party | Term |
|---|---|---|
| Brian Littleproud | National Party | 1992–2001 |

== See also ==
- Electoral districts of Queensland
- Members of the Queensland Legislative Assembly by year
- Category:Members of the Queensland Legislative Assembly by name
