= William Miles (Queensland politician) =

Australian politician

The Hon William Miles
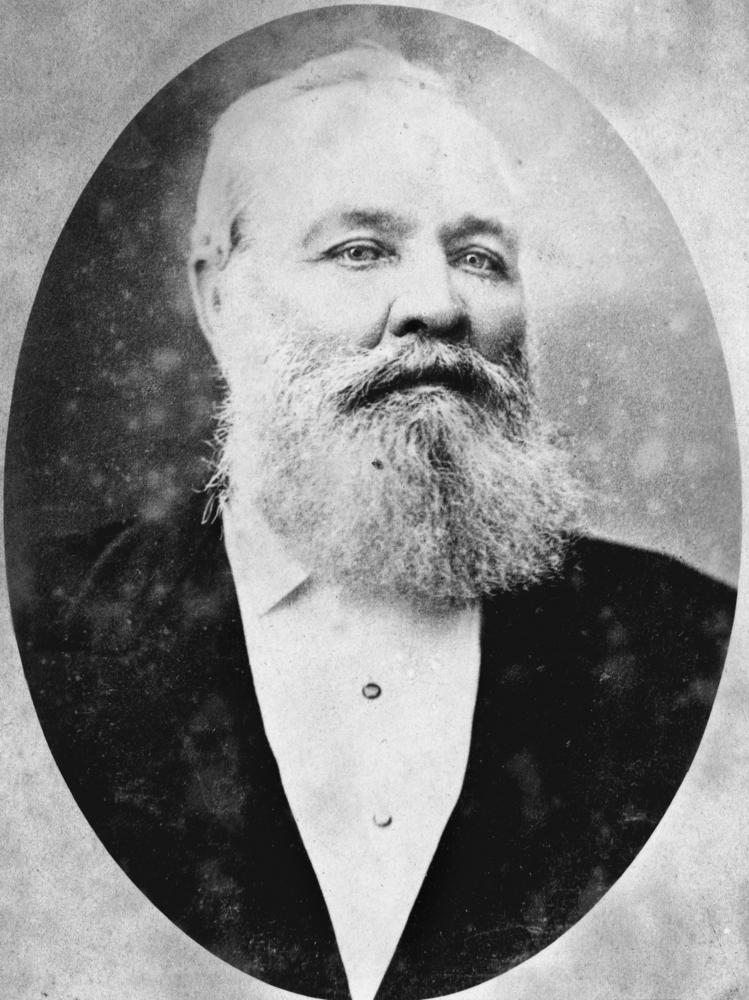
- William Miles, Brisbane, 1877

Member of the Queensland Legislative Assembly for Maranoa
- In office 27 September 1864 – 25 November 1873
- Preceded by: William Francis Kennedy
- Succeeded by: Thomas McIlwraith

Member of the Queensland Legislative Assembly for Carnarvon
- In office 20 January 1874 – 14 October 1875
- Preceded by: Ratcliffe Pring
- Succeeded by: John Tyrel

Member of the Queensland Legislative Assembly for Northern Downs
- In office 14 November 1876 – 21 November 1878
- Preceded by: Henry Thorn
- Succeeded by: Joshua Peter Bell

Member of the Queensland Legislative Assembly for Darling Downs
- In office 26 November 1878 – 22 August 1887
- Preceded by: William Graham
- Succeeded by: William Allan

Personal details
- Born: 5 May 1817 Slateford, Edinburgh, Scotland
- Died: 22 August 1887 (aged 70) Toowoomba, Queensland
- Resting place: Toowong Cemetery
- Party: None
- Spouse: Mary Taylor
- Occupation: Grazier (sheep), Squatter, Station hand

William Miles (5 May 1817 – 22 August 1887) was a politician in Queensland, Australia. He was a Member of the Queensland Legislative Assembly.

== Personal life ==
Miles was born on 5 May 1817 at Hails Quarry, near Edinburgh, Scotland, the son of William Miles and Alison (née Wilson). He married Mary Taylor in Colinton in 1838 and together they emigrated to New South Wales on the ship Duncan as assisted migrants and arrived at Sydney on 30 June 1838. He was employed on Mr. W. H. Chapman's station on the Macleay River, until 1852, when he commenced squatting on his own account on the Dawson River, in the then colony of Queensland.

William Miles died on 22 August 1887 at his home in Toowoomba, when an abscess in his ear led to an inflammation of his brain. He had expressed a wish to be buried in the Toowong Cemetery in Brisbane and his body in a cedar coffin was conveyed by a special black-wreathed train from Toowoomba to Brisbane, where a largely-attended Presbyterian funeral was conducted at the cemetery. He was survived by his wife and two daughters, Jessie (Mrs Herbert Hunter) and Alice (Mrs John Nicholls).

== Public life ==
William Miles was a Member of the Queensland Legislative Assembly representing the Electoral district of Maranoa from 27 September 1864 to 25 November 1873, for the Electoral district of Carnarvon from 20 January 1874 to 14 October 1875, for the Electoral district of Northern Downs from 14 November 1876 to 21 November 1878 and finally for Darling Downs in 1878. He was Colonial Secretary in the Douglas Ministry, from 15 March 1877 to 7 November 1877, when he was transferred to the Public Works Department where he was Secretary for Public Works from 7 November 1877 to 21 September 1878 when he resigned and was succeeded by Sir Samuel Griffith, in whose first Ministry he was Secretary for Public Works and Mines from 13 November 1883 till his death on 22 August 1887.

The town of Miles, Queensland is named after him; he owned a property Dulacca in that area.

Parliament of Queensland
Preceded by William Francis Kennedy	Member for Maranoa; 1864–1873	Succeeded by Thomas McIlwraith
Preceded by Ratcliffe Pring	Member for Carnarvon; 1874–1875	Succeeded by John Tyrel
Preceded by Henry Thorn	Member for Northern Downs; 1876–1878	Succeeded by Joshua Peter Bell
Preceded by William Graham	Member for Darling Downs; 1878–1887	Succeeded by William Allan
