= Thomas McGahan =

Australian politician

Member of the Queensland Legislative Assembly for Cunningham
- In office 21 March 1896 – 11 Mar 1899
- Preceded by: William Allan
- Succeeded by: Francis Kates

Personal details
- Born: Thomas McGahan; 1845 Ballynakelly, Tyrone County, Ireland
- Died: 11 December 1932 (aged 86 or 87) Wynnum, Queensland, Australia
- Resting place: Warwick Cemetery
- Party: Farmer's Representative
- Spouse(s): Hannah Murphy (m.1869 d.1900), Annie McGladrigan (m.1908 d.1934)
- Occupation: Company chairman

Thomas McGahan (1845 – 11 December 1932) was a company chairman and member of the Queensland Legislative Assembly.

== Biography ==
McGahan was born in Ballynakelly, Tyrone County, to parents James McGahan and his wife Mary (née Tally) and educated at Galbally National School and Dungannon College. He arrived in Queensland on board the Golden Dream in 1863 and became a station hand at Rosenthal.

In 1868 McGahan took up a selection of sixty acres and in 1873 he expanded his property holdings to include Swan Creek in Warwick. By 1903 he was the chairman of the Warwick Farmers' Milling Company.

On 22 January 1869 McGahan married Hannah Murphy and together had four sons and one daughter. Hannah died in 1900 and in 1908 he married Annie McGladrigan (d.1934).

He died at Wynnum in 1932 and his body was taken by the Brisbane mail train to Warwick for his funeral and burial in the Warwick Cemetery.

== Political career ==
After being chairman of the Glengallan Divisional Board in 1894, McGahan won the seat of Cunningham in the Queensland Legislative Assembly in 1896. He held the seat for one term, losing in 1899.

== Street name ==
A number of street names in the Brisbane suburb of Carina Heights are identical to the surnames of former Members of the Queensland Legislative Assembly. One of these is McGahan Street.

Parliament of Queensland
Preceded by William Allan	Member for Cunningham; 1896–1899	Succeeded by Francis Kates
