= Alan Fletcher (politician) =

Australian politician (1907–1991)

Sir Alan Fletcher
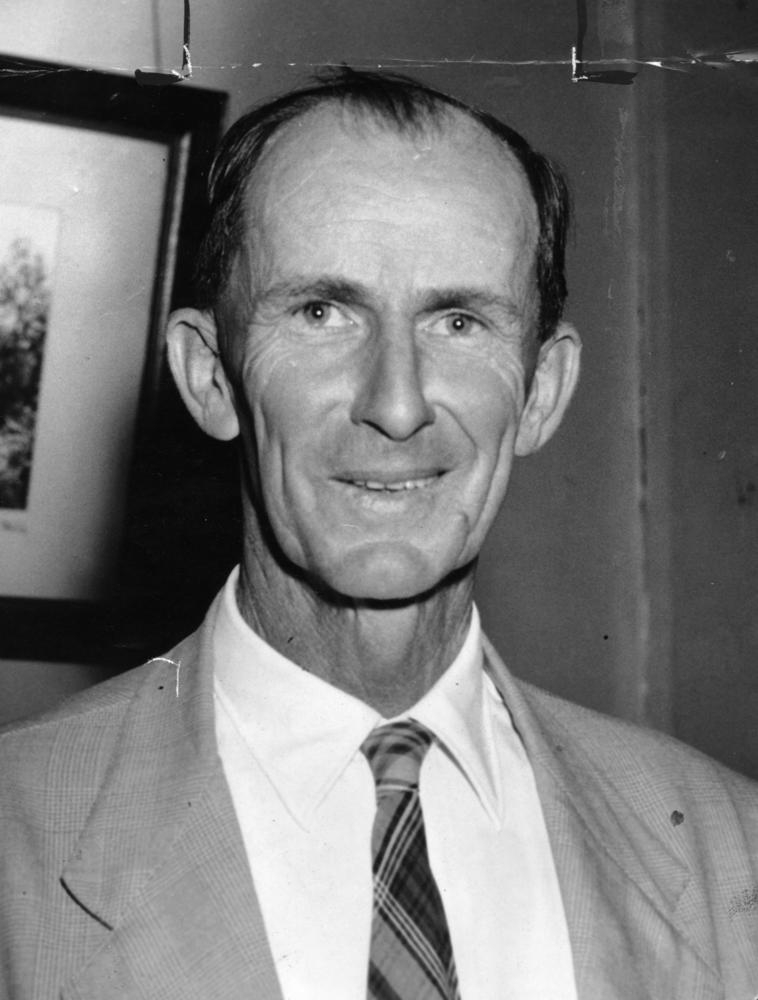

Speaker of the Queensland Legislative Assembly
- In office 27 August 1957 – 15 June 1960
- Preceded by: Johnno Mann
- Succeeded by: David Nicholson
- Constituency: Cunningham

Member of the Queensland Legislative Assembly for Cunningham
- In office 7 March 1953 – 7 December 1974
- Preceded by: Malcolm McIntyre
- Succeeded by: Tony Elliott

Personal details
- Born: Alan Roy Fletcher; 26 January 1907 Pittsworth, Queensland
- Died: 7 October 1991 (aged 84) Toowoomba, Queensland
- Party: Country Party
- Spouse: Enid Edna Phair Thompson (m. 1934)
- Relations: Malcolm McIntyre (uncle)
- Occupation: Dairy farmer

Sir Alan Roy Fletcher (1907–1991) was a politician in Queensland, Australia. He was a Member of the Queensland Legislative Assembly.

== Early life ==
Alan Roy Fletcher was born on 26 January 1907 at Pittsworth, Queensland, the son of Alexander Roy Fletcher and his wife Rosena Wilhelmine (née McIntyre). He was educated at Pittsworth State School and Scots College in Warwick. He married Enid Edna Phair Thompson on 15 March 1934; the couple had 2 sons and 2 daughters. He was engaged in farming at Mount Tyson, Queensland.

== Politics ==
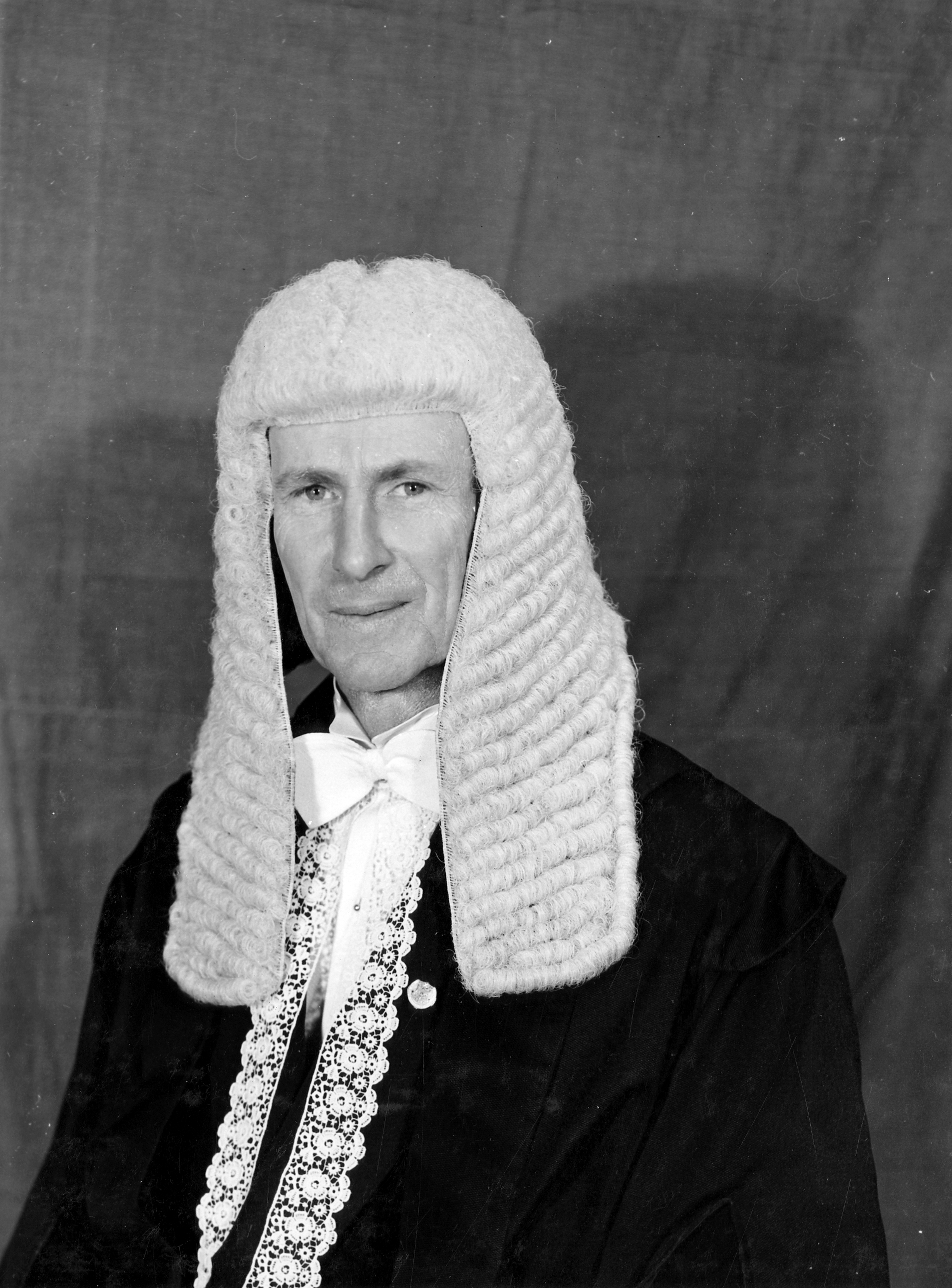
The Hon Alan Roy Fletcher MLA, Minister for Lands and Irrigation 1960-1963 - Brisbane

Alan Fletcher was a member of the Country Party.

He served as a councillor in the Pittsworth Shire Council from 1945 to 1955 and was its chairman for nine years 1949–1957.

He was elected to the Queensland Legislative Assembly in the electoral district of Cunningham at the 1953 election, holding his seat until retirement at the 1974 election.

During his 21 years in state politics, he held a number of important roles:

- Speaker: 27 August 1957 – 15 June 1960
- Minister for Lands and Irrigation: 16 June 1960 – 17 January 1968
- Minister for Education and Cultural Activities: 17 January 1968 – 23 December 1974

In 1972, Alan Fletcher was knighted for services to the parliament and the people of Queensland.

== Later life ==
Alan Fletcher died on 7 October 1991 at Toowoomba. He was cremated, and his ashes placed in a columbarium wall at Pittsworth Cemetery.

== See also ==
- Members of the Queensland Legislative Assembly, 1953–1956; 1956–1957; 1957–1960; 1960–1963; 1963–1966; 1966–1969; 1969–1972; 1972–1974

Parliament of Queensland
Preceded by Johnno Mann	Speaker of the Legislative Assembly; 1950 – 1957	Succeeded by David Nicholson
Preceded by Malcolm McIntyre	Member for Cunningham; 1953 – 1974	Succeeded by Tony Elliott
