= Thomas Moffatt =

Australian politician

The Hon Thomas de Lacy Moffatt
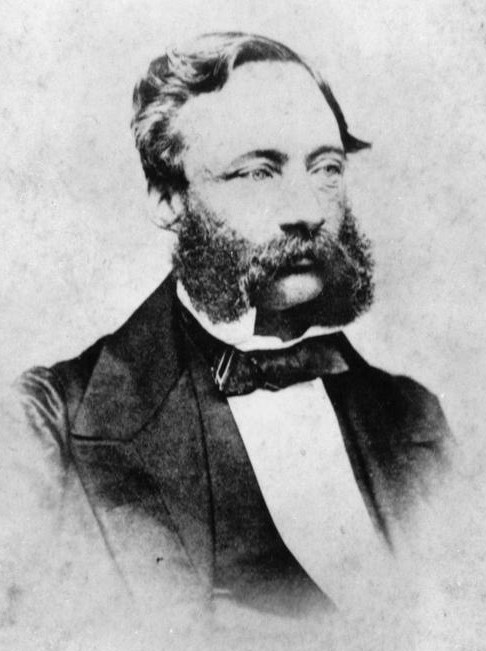

2nd Treasurer of Queensland
- In office 4 Aug 1862 – 2 Oct 1864
- Preceded by: Robert Mackenzie
- Succeeded by: Joshua Bell
- Constituency: Western Downs

Member of the Queensland Legislative Assembly for Western Downs
- In office 27 April 1860 – 2 October 1864 Serving with James Taylor
- Preceded by: New seat
- Succeeded by: John Watts

Personal details
- Born: 17 April 1824 Athlone, Ireland
- Died: 2 October 1864 (aged 40) Ipswich, Queensland
- Spouse: Mary Isabella Bell
- Occupation: Grazier, Squatter

Thomas de Lacy Moffatt (17 April 1824 – 2 October 1864), was a politician in colonial Queensland, and a Treasurer of Queensland. His surname is also sometimes spelled "Moffat".

== Early life ==
Moffatt was born in 1824 in Athlone, County Westmeath, Ireland, the son of James Moffatt, the rector of Athlone, and his wife Elizabeth née Kellett. He set out for Australia in 1844 and worked with his uncle, Captain R. G. Moffatt, a former magistrate and commander of the military police in Port Stephens who by that time had turned his attention to agriculture and sheep farming. He later moved north and became a squatter, establishing a station called "Callandoon" on the Darling Downs. He sold the station in 1849 and moved to the town of Drayton. In 1852, the pastoral run Woondul was transferred from Moffat to Henry Stuart Russell.

== Political career ==
Moffatt was elected to the first Legislative Assembly of Queensland on 27 April 1860 for the district of Western Downs. Moffatt became Colonial Treasurer in the first Robert Herbert Ministry on 4 August 1862, and retained this post till his death on 2 October 1864.

Political offices
| Preceded by Robert Mackenzie | Treasurer of Queensland; 1862–1864 | Succeeded by Joshua Bell |
Parliament of Queensland
| New seat | Member for Western Downs; 1860–1864; Served alongside: James Taylor | Succeeded by John Watts |
