= Malcolm McIntyre =

Australian cheesmaker and politician

Member of the Queensland Legislative Assembly for Cunningham
- In office 15 Apr 1944 – 7 Mar 1953
- Preceded by: William Deacon
- Succeeded by: Alan Fletcher

Personal details
- Born: Malcolm McIntyre; 9 March 1889 Pittsworth, Australia
- Died: 12 August 1969 (aged 80) Pittsworth, Australia
- Resting place: Pittsworth Cemetery
- Party: Country
- Spouse(s): Rose Marron Quire (m.1916 d.1929), Annie Dore (m.1933 d.1956)
- Relations: Donald McIntyre (uncle), Alan Fletcher (nephew)
- Occupation: Cheesemaker

Malcolm McIntyre (9 March 1889 – 12 August 1969) was a cheesemaker and member of the Queensland Legislative Assembly.

== Biography ==
McIntyre was born at Pittsworth, Queensland, to parents Colin McKenzie McIntyre and his wife Wilhelmina Elizabeth (née Keefer) and educated at the local State School. He became a farmhand on his father's property, Glenmore at Mount Tyson and in 1916 he bought Sedgemoore, a property in the same area.

On the 2nd Aug 1916 McIntyre married Rose Marron Quire and together had two sons and one daughter. Rose died in 1929 and on the 22 Jun 1933 he married Annie Dore (died 1956). McIntyre died in 1969 and was buried in the Pittsworth Cemetery.

== Public career ==
McIntyre first started in politics as a councilor on Pittsworth Shire Council, serving from 1936 to 1948.

He then won the seat of Cunningham at the 1944 Queensland elections, replacing the retiring member William Deacon. He remained the member for Cunningham until 1953 when he did not contest that year's state election.

McIntyre was also chairman of directors of the Mount Tyson Cooperative Dairy Association, director of the Queensland Cheese Manufacturers Association and chairman of the Queensland Cheese Marketing Board & Queensland Dairymen's Organisation (Mt Tyson branch).

His uncle, Donald McIntyre, was the member for Aubigny and his nephew was Alan Fletcher, who took over the seat of Cunningham from him.

He was very civic minded being chairman of the Mount Tyson School Committee, and the Rossvale and District School Sports Association, and State President of the Sailors, Soldiers and Airmen's Association of Queensland. He was also a member of many charitable organisations in the district.

Parliament of Queensland
Preceded by William Deacon	Member for Cunningham; 1944–1953	Succeeded by Alan Fletcher
