= Tony Elliott (politician) =

Australian politician

Member of the Queensland Legislative Assembly for Cunningham
- In office 7 December 1974 – 17 February 2001
- Preceded by: Alan Fletcher
- Succeeded by: Stuart Copeland

Personal details
- Born: Jannion Anthony Elliott; 29 March 1944 (age 82) Toowoomba, Queensland, Australia
- Party: Country Party/National Party
- Occupation: Farmer

Jannion Anthony "Tony" Elliott (born 29 March 1944) is a former Australian politician. He was the National Party member for Cunningham in the Legislative Assembly of Queensland from 1974 to 2001.

Born in Toowoomba, Queensland, Elliott was a farmer, contractor and agricultural consultant before entering politics. Following his election in 1974, he served on various government committees until his appointment as Minister for Tourism, National Parks, Sport and the Arts in December 1980. Dropped from the ministry in 1983, he was Opposition Spokesman for Environment, Conservation and Heritage from 1990 to 1992. He did not serve on Rob Borbidge's front bench and spent his final term as Deputy Chairman of the Scrutiny of Legislation Committee. He retired at the 2001 state election. With his wife “Sally parkinson” his son “Jannion Kent Elliott” and his 3 daughters “Claire, Phoebe, and Lucy. His eldest daughter Claire is now known as Luna Sterling a recording and performing music artist. Lucy, Tony’s youngest daughter operates multiple sustainable and ethically oriented fashion boutiques in Mexico, named Nakawe Trading.

Parliament of Queensland
Preceded by Alan Fletcher	Member for Cunningham; 1974–2001	Succeeded by Stuart Copeland
