= John Watts (Australian politician) =

Australian politician

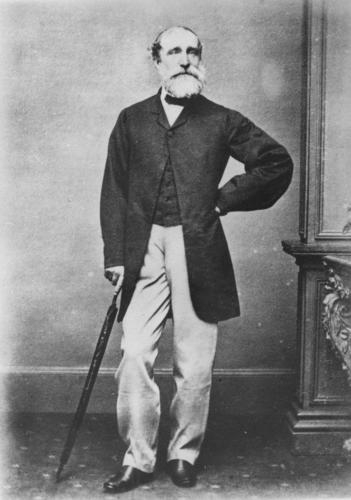

Member of the Queensland Legislative Assembly for Drayton and Toowoomba
- In office 2 May 1860 – 26 July 1862
- Preceded by: New seat
- Succeeded by: William Henry Groom

Member of the Queensland Legislative Council
- In office 8 April 1864 – 31 October 1864

Member of the Queensland Legislative Assembly for Western Downs
- In office 2 November 1864 – 18 June 1867 Serving with James Taylor
- Preceded by: Thomas Moffatt
- Succeeded by: Robert Ramsay

Personal details
- Born: John Watts; 27 February 1821 Frampton-on-Severn, Gloucestershire, England
- Died: 18 November 1902 (aged 81) Wimborne, Dorset, England
- Spouse(s): Jane Lambie Nelson (m.1854 d.1863), Caroline Sophia (née Cochrane) (m.1868)
- Occupation: Farmer

John Watts (27 February 1821 – 18 November 1902) was a member of both the Queensland Legislative Assembly and the Queensland Legislative Council. Watts managed the Eton Vale station with Arthur Hodgson and later took it over. During his time in Queensland Watts wrote an account of farming and pastoral life, and the difficulties associated with it, as experienced by the early pioneers of South-East Queensland. He also commissioned an 18-carat gold swag necklace by Danish creator Christian Ludwig Qwist (1818–1877) who arrived in Australia circa 1852. The necklace, a fine example of silversmithing and craftsmanship. Watt's papers and necklace are held by the State Library of Queensland. The necklace is considered a treasure of the John Oxley Library.

== Politics ==
Watts was a member of the first Parliament of Queensland, representing the seat of Drayton and Toowoomba from 2 May 1860 till his resignation due to ill health on 26 July 1862. He was appointed to the Queensland Legislative Council on 8 April 1864 and resigned on 31 October 1864 due to having been elected as the member for Western Downs from 2 November 1864 till 18 June 1867.

== Later life ==
Watts returned to England in 1867 and died at Wimborne, Dorset in 1902.

== Legacy ==
During his time in Queensland Watts commissioned an 18-carat gold swag necklace by Danish creator Christian Ludwig Qwist (1818–1877) who arrived in Australia circa 1852. The necklace features five openwork carved gold hinged pendants and is a fine example of silversmithing and craftsmanship. The necklace is held by the State Library of Queensland and is considered a treasure of the John Oxley Library.

Parliament of Queensland
New seat	Member for Drayton and Toowoomba; 1860–1862	Succeeded by William Henry Groom
Preceded by Thomas Moffatt	Member for Western Downs; 1864–1867; Served alongside: James Taylor	Succeeded by Robert Ramsay
