= Robert Ramsay (Queensland politician) =

Scottish Australian politician

The Honourable Robert Ramsay
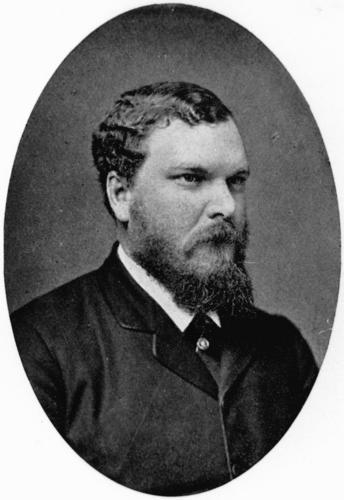
- Ramsay c. 1880

8th Treasurer of Queensland
- In office 3 May 1870 – 28 March 1871
- Preceded by: Thomas Blacket Stephens
- Succeeded by: Joshua Peter Bell
- Constituency: Western Downs

Member of the Queensland Legislative Assembly for Western Downs
- In office 18 June 1867 – 6 November 1873 Serving with James Taylor, Edward Wienholt
- Preceded by: John Watts
- Succeeded by: Seat abolished

Member of the Queensland Legislative Council
- In office 2 January 1874 – 14 June 1877

Personal details
- Born: Robert Burnett Ramsay; 19 March 1818 Kolkata, West Bengal
- Died: 5 July 1910 (aged 92) Bekesbourne, Kent England
- Spouse: Susan Lindsay Carnegie (m.1855)
- Occupation: Grazier

Robert Ramsay (19 March 1818 – 5 July 1910) was a member of the Australian Queensland Legislative Council, the Queensland Legislative Assembly, and the eighth Treasurer of Queensland.

== Early life ==
Ramsay was born in Kolkata, West Bengal, in British India, on 15 March 1818 to Robert Ramsay, a captain in His Majesty's 14th. Regt. of Foot, and his wife Margaret (née Cruickshank). He was the eldest child in a Scottish family of three sons and two daughters, the youngest of whom was the writer Elizabeth Ramsay-Laye, 1832-1932, who when she wasn't writing under her own name used the nom-de-plume Isabel Massary. Robert Ramsay was educated in Edinburgh and at Harrow. In 1836, with a military career in mind, he also attended L'École Spéciale Militaire de Saint-Cyr, founded by Napoleon in 1803.

== Business and Pastoral Interests in Australia ==
In about 1837, after having had second thoughts about army life, Ramsay started to see business and farming opportunities in Australia. His father was by then a partner in Cruickshank Melville & Co., a mercantile firm in London that, in addition to its main business in the West Indies, was already doing some business with Australia.

On 24 February 1838 he arrived in Port Jackson in New South Wales aboard the 'Upton Castle'. Also aboard the ship were fellow Scotsman Joshua Richmond Young, one of his future business partners, and the incoming New South Wales governor Sir George Gipps. In Sydney on 5 March 1838, with Joshua Young and his brother Alexander, both of whom he had known in Scotland, he established Ramsay, Young & Co., a mercantile firm and shipping agent. The inclusion of the name 'Ramsay & Young' in a letter dated 22 August 1838 to Sir Gordon Bremer regarding a new settlement at Port Essington revealed that even then Robert and his partners had an eye on trading up north. From sometime in 1839 until 27 January 1843, Ramsay and the Young brothers were also in business with a John Holdsworth in Holdsworth & Co., a trading company in Sydney that specialised in ironmongery. Anecdotal evidence together with numerous local newspaper advertisements and articles at the time relating to shipping in and out of Sydney suggests that both firms did well. By 1843 though, Ramsay was hearing about the massive potential of what was later to become Queensland and getting itchy feet. On 27 January 1843, the Holdsworth & Co. partnership was dissolved; on 1 October 1844, Ramsay, Young & Co. was dissolved. In September 1844, freed briefly from his business commitments, Ramsay became a magistrate although his time on the Sydney bench was short-lived. By 1846, he had left Sydney to run stock on Rosalie Plains, an area of 64,000 acres on the Darling Downs that was then still "beyond location".

Having acquired the lease over Rosalie Plains on 15 June 1847, Ramsay went into partnership with Louis Hope in April 1848 and with him acquired Lagoon Creek Downs in October 1848, Cooyar station in August 1849, Kilcoy on 11 September 1854, East Esmond and East Crinum in November 1854 and at least two other stations in the Burnett area, Upper Crinum and Lower Crinum, at about the same time. Robert Ramsay's licence to depasture Rosalie Plains was transferred to the new partnership on 2 August 1848.

Between 1848 and February 1866 when the partnership was dissolved, Hope & Ramsay invested huge amounts of money and time into the development of numerous pastoral properties on and close to the Darling Downs. Their holdings also included the pastoral interests at Mundubbera of Ramsay's younger brother Marmaduke following his death by drowning while crossing the Dawson River on 20 September 1865. An advertisement in the Brisbane Courier on 6 April 1866 reveals that the runs of M[armaduke] Ramsay and representatives of [his former business partner] the late A[lexander] Jopp, who had also died by drowning, were transferred to Louis Hope and Marmaduke's brother Robert Ramsay on 1 April 1865. They included Hawkwood and Oaky Creek.

On 9 January 1858, Mort & Co, on behalf of Hope & Ramsay, placed an advertisement in the Sydney Morning Herald about the forthcoming auction of their flagship stations at Rosalie Plains and Cooyar. Hope & Ramsay reportedly sold the stations to William Kent & Edward Wienholt. However, some reports say that the deal, worth £41,000 including 37,500 sheep and 1200 cattle, fell through and that Hope and Ramsay continued to lease the properties until they were transferred to the Queensland Lands Department in 1870.

In June 1859, confident that his pastoral interests were being properly looked after by paid managers, Ramsay went to England and Scotland for an extended holiday. He didn't return to Australia until 1865. Soon after his return, he entered into partnership with his good friend Arthur Hodgson, later Sir Arthur Hodgson, by buying former station manager John Watts' share of Eton Vale, a substantial station on the eastern Darling Downs that Hodgson and his brother Christopher had established 25 years earlier, and which had only recently been secured against selection by use of the pre-emptive right and provisions of the Leasing Act of 1866. Following the formal dissolution in February 1866 of his partnership with Louis Hope, who was by then actively involved in Australia's burgeoning sugar industry, Ramsay and his family moved into the Eton Vale homestead from where he took over the day-to-day management of the station. The business partnership between Ramsay and Hodgson not only went on to become hugely successful in its own right but led to the formation of the much larger pastoral firm of Ramsay Brothers & Hodgson, a partnership between Robert Ramsay's sons Frank, Bob, Lauderdale, Douglas and Norman, and Arthur Hodgson's son Edward, that made most of its fortune from merino wool in and around Winton in central Queensland. Although Robert Ramsay and Arthur Hodgson remained firm friends until Hodgson's death in Stratford-upon-Avon in 1902, their business partnership ended in 1893 when Ramsay purchased a 35,000 acre (14,164 ha) portion of Eton Vale for himself. He named it Harrow after his sons' old school in England and because Arthur Hodgson was an old Etonian who had named Eton Vale after his old school.

== Politics ==
Ramsay won the seat of Western Downs at the 1867 Queensland colonial election. He was made Colonial Treasurer on the 3 May 1870 and held that role until 28 March 1871.

He resigned as the member for Western Downs in November 1873 and was appointed to the Queensland Legislative Council in 1874. However, the seat was declared vacant three years later as Ramsay had by then spent most of that period in England.

== Personal life ==
On 18 April 1855, while on a visit to England and Scotland, Robert Burnett Ramsay married Susan Lindsay Carnegie, daughter of William Fullarton-Lindsay and Jane Christian, née Carnegie, a daughter of William Carnegie, 7th Earl of Northesk. With his new bride, he sailed for Australia in August 1855 and, after a brief sojourn in Sydney, returned to his home at Rosalie Plains later that year. Contrary to what the Australian Dictionary of Biography says, they had fourteen children, five of whom died before reaching adulthood. Two of his sons, Marmaduke and Robert, were both first-class cricketers. He retired to 'Howletts' near Bekesbourne in Kent in 1887 and died there on 5 July 1910. Ramsay Street in Toowoomba and the locality of Ramsay on the Darling Downs were named in his honour.

Parliament of Queensland
Preceded by John Watts	Member for Western Downs; 1867–1873; Served alongside: James Taylor, Edward Wienholt	Abolished
