= Portuguese campaign in Mozambique (World War I) =

- Part of East African campaign (World War I)
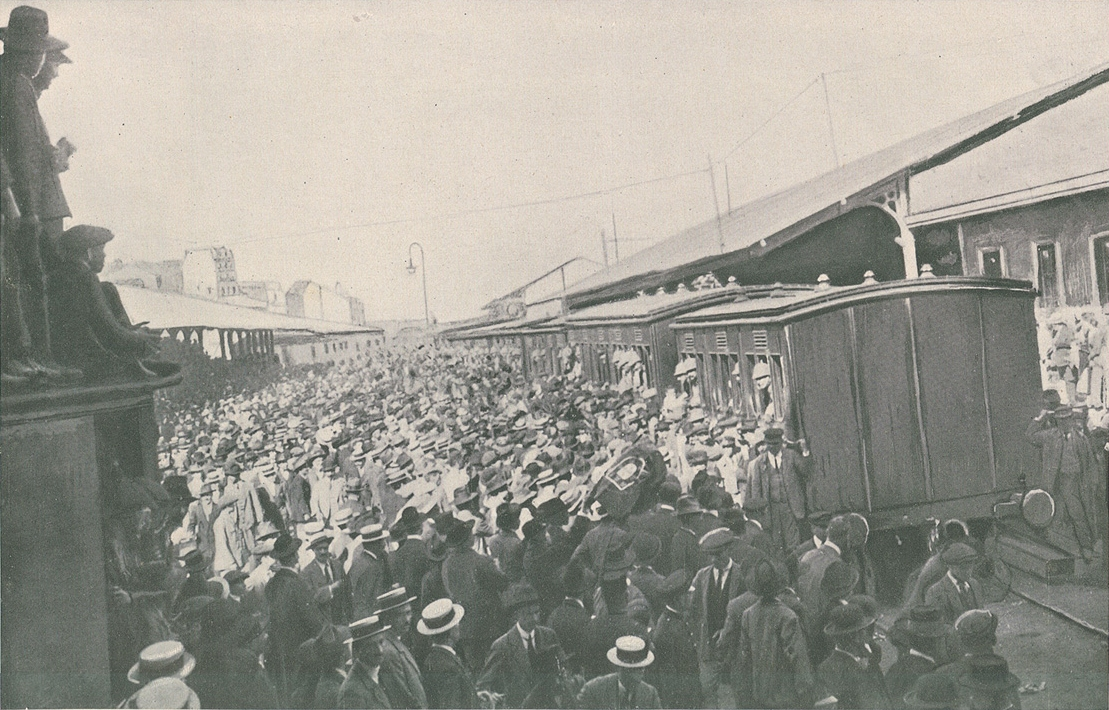
- 15th Infantry Battalion departs from Lisbon for African colonies, 1914
Date	24 August 1914 – November 1918
Location	Portuguese East Africa
Result	Portuguese victory

Belligerents
German Empire; German East Africa	First Portuguese Republic; (Portuguese Mozambique) Portuguese East Africa; (United Kingdom) British Empire

Commanders and leaders
(German Empire) Wolfgang Weck (German Empire) Paul von Lettow-Vorbeck (German Empire) Erich Müller	(First Portuguese Republic) Pedro Massano de Amorim (First Portuguese Republic) Eduardo Costa † (First Portuguese Republic) Major da Silveira (First Portuguese Republic) João Teixeira Pinto † (United Kingdom) Eric Gore-Browne † (United Kingdom) Jacob van Deventer

Strength
Unknown	August 1914: 1,477; October 1916: 2,700

The Portuguese campaign in Mozambique during World War I was part of the broader East African Campaign. This lasted until the collapse of German forces in East Africa in November 1918.

== Background ==
At the outbreak of World War I, the proximity of Portuguese Mozambique to German East Africa, along with the old alliance between Portugal and Britain, placed Mozambique in a risky position. Despite Portugal maintaining a policy of neutrality, it was under pressure from Britain, its ally, to support the British military in Africa. This included allowing British forces to pass through Portuguese territory and improving their defenses along Mozambique's northern border.

By early August 1914, tensions were rising along Mozambique's borders, particularly in the south, where a Boer revolt was imminent. To suppress this uprising, Britain requested not only rifles but also permission to move British troops through Mozambique. Portugal deemed it essential to reinforce the frontier, especially the area along the Rovuma River, which had a very limited Portuguese military presence. On August 18, 1914, Portugal dispatched its first expedition to Mozambique, consisting of approximately 1,477 men, most from the 3rd Battalion of the 15th Infantry Regiment. The mission was to establish military posts along the Rovuma River.

== Campaign ==
=== Attack on Maziua, 1914 ===
The frontier posts established along the Rovuma River were very basic. The post at Maziua, situated far from the main Portuguese stronghold of Porto Amélia, was one of the weakest, defended by a small garrison of just one sergeant and half a dozen indigenous soldiers from the Niassa Company's police force. On August 24, 1914, the German forces launched an unexpected and unjustified attack on the post. The German forces raided and massacred the indigenous soldiers who were guarding the post, and the sergeant Eduardo Costa was killed during the attack.

=== Portuguese occupation of Kionga, 1916 ===
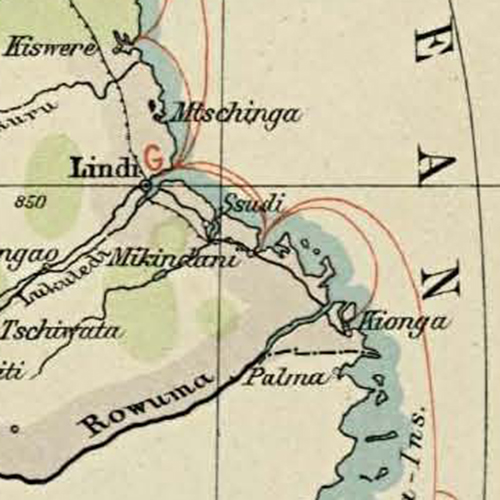
Kionga Triangle, located on the southern bank of the Ruvuma River

The Kionga Triangle had long been disputed between Portugal and Germany. When Portugal entered World War I in March 1916, reclaiming the Kionga Triangle became a priority for local forces. At the time, the Portuguese garrison included around 1,500 Europeans and 2,800 African troops, many weakened by illness. Without waiting for reinforcements, Major da Silveira launched an offensive early in April, assembling a force of 400 at Palmas, near the Kionga. The small German detachment made no attempt to resist, and by 10 April the Portuguese had occupied the Triangle.

However, German forces on the opposite bank continued to launch raids. Major da Silveira organized a river crossing with naval support from the cruiser Adamastor and gunboat Chaimite to counter the Germans. On 27 May, native troops attempted to land at Mwambo, but German defenders waited until the boats were in close range before opening fire, forcing the Portuguese to abandon their attempts.

=== Battle of Ngomano, 1917 ===
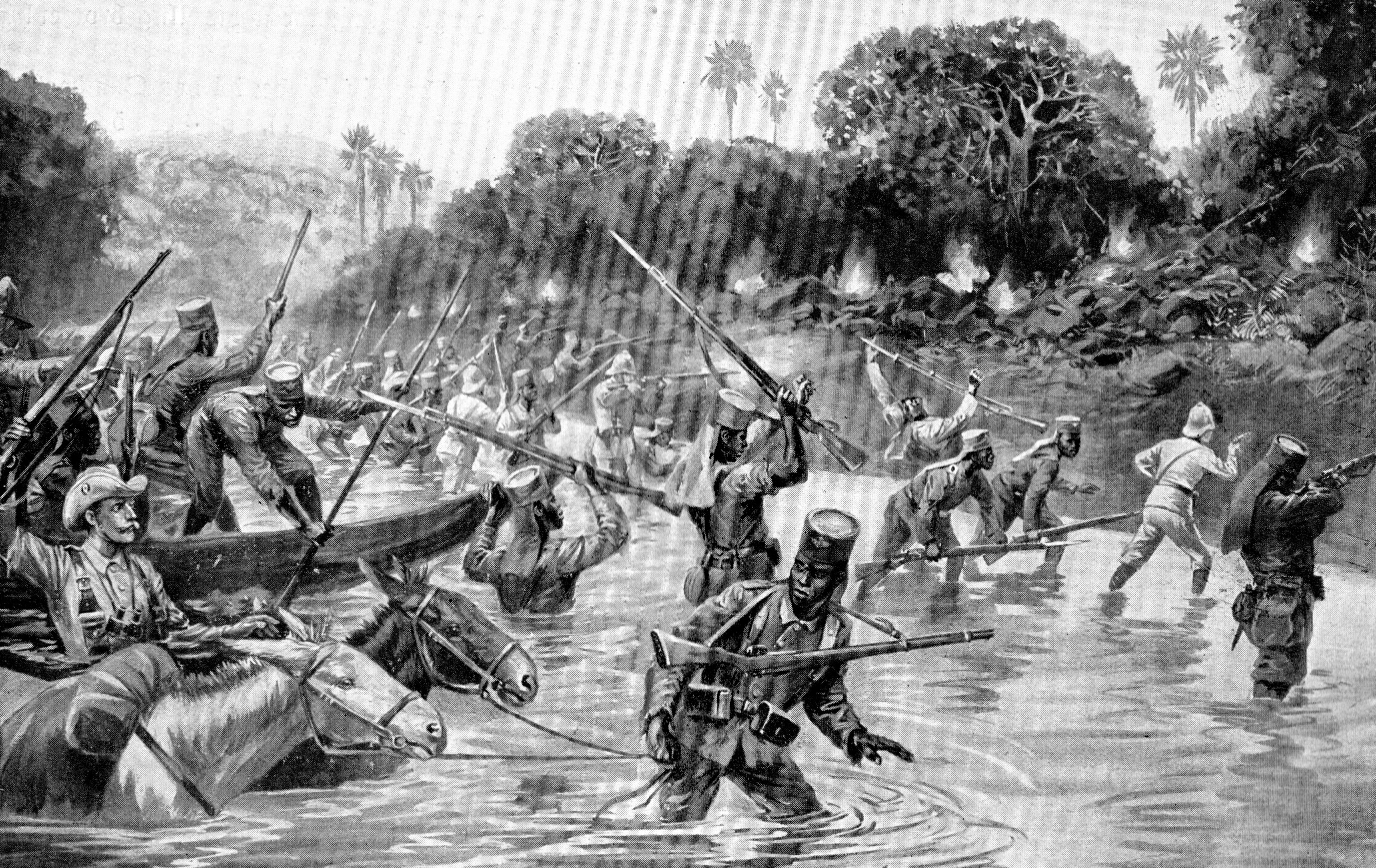
Breakthrough of the Schutztruppe at the Rovuma, November 1917

On 25 November 1917, at 07:00, the Portuguese garrison at Ngomano was warned of an impending attack but was unprepared. The Germans distracted them with artillery fire while crossing the Rovuma River upstream. The Germans flanked the camp with six infantry companies from multiple directions. The Portuguese were surprised by the attack from the rear, and their defenses collapsed after their officers were killed, despite preparing for the initial attack. With the Portuguese lacking weapons and facing heavy casualties, they eventually surrendered, even though they had enough supplies to continue fighting.

=== Battle of Medo, 1918 ===
On 12 April 1918, German detachments under Major Koehl, part of General Paul von Lettow‑Vorbeck's Schutztruppe, attacked the Portuguese post at Medo in northern Mozambique. The garrison, numbering several hundred men, was quickly overwhelmed, and the Germans seized food, ammunition, and equipment.

The victory at Medo allowed Lettow‑Vorbeck's column to resupply and continue its campaign deeper into Mozambique. The clash also exposed the weakness of Portuguese colonial defenses and marked the beginning of a series of confrontations in northern Mozambique, culminating in the larger Battle of Mbalama Hill later that month.

=== Battle of Namacurra, 1918 ===
On July 1, 1918, the Germans entered Namacurra, three battalions supported by two British King's African Rifle companies under Colonel Gore-Browne, facing three German companies led by Captain Müller. By July 3, von Lettow had deployed his main force, pushing the Portuguese back to the Namacurra River. During their retreat, 100 men drowned, including Gore-Browne. The fighting ended in the afternoon of July 3.

== See also ==
- Campaigns of Pacification and Occupation
  - Mueda campaign

== Bibliography ==
- Matias, Diogo (2010). "As operações militares de manutenção do Império Português em África: Uma visão sobre as tácticas usadas na perspectiva da doutrina actual" (PDF).
- Paice, Edward (2008) [2007]. Tip & Run: The Untold Tragedy of the Great War in Africa. London: Phoenix. ISBN 978-0-7538-2349-1.
- Downes, Walter (1919). With the Nigerians in German East Africa. London: Methuen & Co. OCLC 10329057.
- David Smith, Graham Turner (2022). The East Africa Campaign 1914–18: Von Lettow-Vorbeck’s Masterpiece, Bloomsbury Publishing. ISBN 9781472848925
- Gaudi, Robert (2017). African Kaiser: General Paul Von Lettow-Vorbeck and the Great War in Africa, Hurst. ISBN 9781849048675
- Erez Manela, Robert Gerwarth (2014). Empires at War: 1911–1923, OUP Oxford. ISBN 9780191006944
- David F. Burg, L. Edward Purcell (2010). Almanac of World War I, University Press of Kentucky. ISBN 9780813127453
- Stacke, Henry Fitz Maurice (1941). Military Operations East Africa. Vol. 1.
