= William Graham (Queensland politician) =

Australian politician

The Hon William Graham
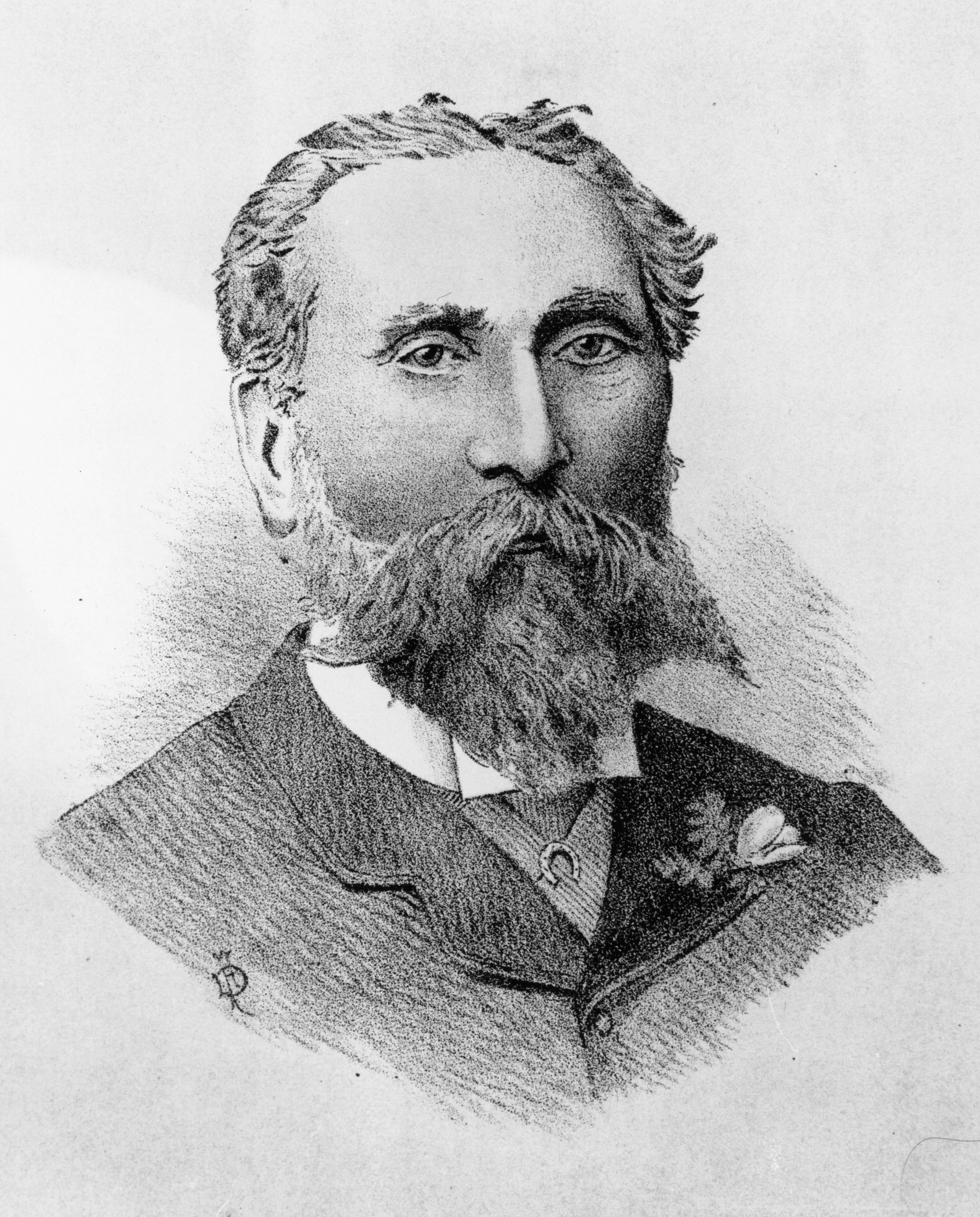

Member of the Queensland Legislative Assembly for Darling Downs
- In office 23 March 1875 – 26 November 1878
- Preceded by: Edward Wienholt
- Succeeded by: Seat abolished

Member of the Queensland Legislative Council
- In office 5 August 1880 – 12 June 1892

Personal details
- Born: William Graham; 11 November 1836 Edinburgh, Scotland
- Died: 12 June 1892 (aged 55) Brisbane, Queensland, Australia
- Resting place: Toowong Cemetery
- Spouse: Louisa Elizabeth Turner (m.1864 d.1914)
- Relations: John Sargent Turner (brother-in-law)
- Education: University of Edinburgh
- Occupation: Grazier

William Graham was a politician in Queensland, Australia. He was a Member of the Queensland Legislative Assembly and a Member of the Queensland Legislative Council.

== Politics ==
William Graham was elected to the Queensland Legislative Assembly for Darling Downs at a by-election on 23 March 1875. He held the seat until 26 November 1878 when he made a last-minute decision to not contest the 1878 election.

Graham was appointed to the Queensland Legislative Council on 5 August 1880. Being a lifetime appointment, he served until his death on 7 June 1892.

== Personal life ==
Graham married Louisa Elizabeth Turner on 9 January 1864 in Brisbane.

Graham was buried in the Toowong Cemetery.

Parliament of Queensland
Preceded by Edward Wienholt	Member for Darling Downs; 1875–1878	Abolished
