= Electoral district of Cunningham =

Cunningham Queensland—Legislative Assembly
- State: Queensland
- Dates current: 1888–2009
- Namesake: Allan Cunningham

Cunningham was an electoral district of the Legislative Assembly in the Australian state of Queensland from 1888 to 2009.

Prior to its abolition, the district occupied an area of the Darling Downs, south and west of Toowoomba. Historically, it was centred on the town of Clifton. The eastern portion of Cunningham drew voters from the southern suburbs of Toowoomba. There were also a number of small rural towns in the electorate, including Pittsworth, Millmerran and Cambooya, but no major centres. It was solidly conservative for its entire existence, and was held by the National Party without interruption from 1920 until the Nationals merged into the Liberal National Party of Queensland.

In 2008, Cunningham was abolished—with effect at the 2009 state election—following a redistribution undertaken by the Electoral Commission of Queensland. Its former territory and voters were split between the districts of Toowoomba South, Southern Downs and the new seat of Condamine.

== Members for Cunningham ==
Member	Party	Term
William Allan	Unaligned	1888–1896
Thomas McGahan	Farmer's Representative	1896–1899
Francis Kates	Independent Ministerialist	1899–1903
Duncan Watson	Ministerialist	1903–1904
Francis Grayson	Ministerialist/Liberal/Independent/National	1904–1920
William Deacon	Country	1920–1943
Malcolm McIntyre	Country	1944–1953
Alan Fletcher	Country	1953–1974
Tony Elliott	Country	1974–1975
Tony Elliott	National Country	1975–1982
Tony Elliott	National	1982–2001
Stuart Copeland	National	2001–2008
Stuart Copeland	Liberal National	2008–2009
Stuart Copeland	Independent	2009

== See also ==
- Electoral districts of Queensland
- Members of the Queensland Legislative Assembly by year
- Category:Members of the Queensland Legislative Assembly by name
