= 1878 Queensland colonial election =

Elections were held in the Australian state of Queensland between 4 November 1878 and 10 December 1878 to elect the members of the state's Legislative Assembly.

== Key dates ==
Due to problems of distance and communications, it was not possible to hold the elections on a single day.

== See also ==
- Members of the Queensland Legislative Assembly, 1878–1883
