= Queensland Imperial Bushmen =

Military unit

The Queensland Imperial Bushmen was an Australian mounted Imperial Bushmen regiment raised in the Queensland colony for service during the Second Boer War.

== History ==
=== Background ===
The outbreak of the Second Boer War in 1899 put a strain on the colonial forces of the British Empire. The forces of the South African Republic and Orange Free State skirmished with the British Natal Contingent, prompting an escalation of hostilities. In a show of support for the empire, the governments of the self-governing British colonies of Canada, New Zealand, Natal, Cape Colony and the six Australian colonies all offered men to participate in the conflict. The Australian contingents, numbering around 16,000 men in total, were the largest contribution from the Empire, and were supplemented by a further 7,000 Australian men who served in other colonial or irregular units.

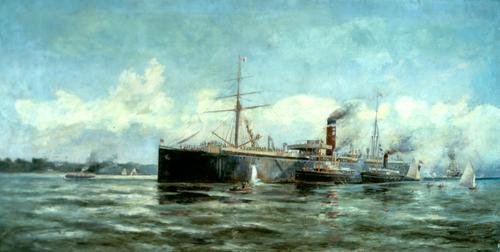
Frederick Elliott's painting The Departure of the SS Cornwall depicting the departure from Brisbane of advanced elements of the Queensland Bushmen contingents for the South African War, on Wednesday 1 November 1899.

=== Boer War ===
The British Australian government was called upon to raise battalions to send to South Africa. As with the other five Australian domains, Queensland raised a contingent of mounted soldiers for the Second Boer War. The 4th and 5th Queensland Imperial Bushmen departed Brisbane on 18 May 1900 and were deployed to Cape Town on 31 June 1900. Both contingents served with distinction during the conflict, and developed a tough reputation among the Boers.

One Boer commander, Koos de la Rey, was quoted as saying:

For the first time in the war we are fighting men who used our own tactics against us. They were Australian volunteers and though small in number we could not take their position. They were the only troops who could scout our lines at night and kill our sentries while killing or capturing our scouts. Our men admitted that the Australians were more formidable opponents and far more dangerous than any other British troops.

Following the conclusion of the conflict, the Queensland Imperial Bushmen sailed for home on 7 July 1901 and were disbanded on 5 May 1902.
