= William Allan (Queensland politician) =

Australian politician

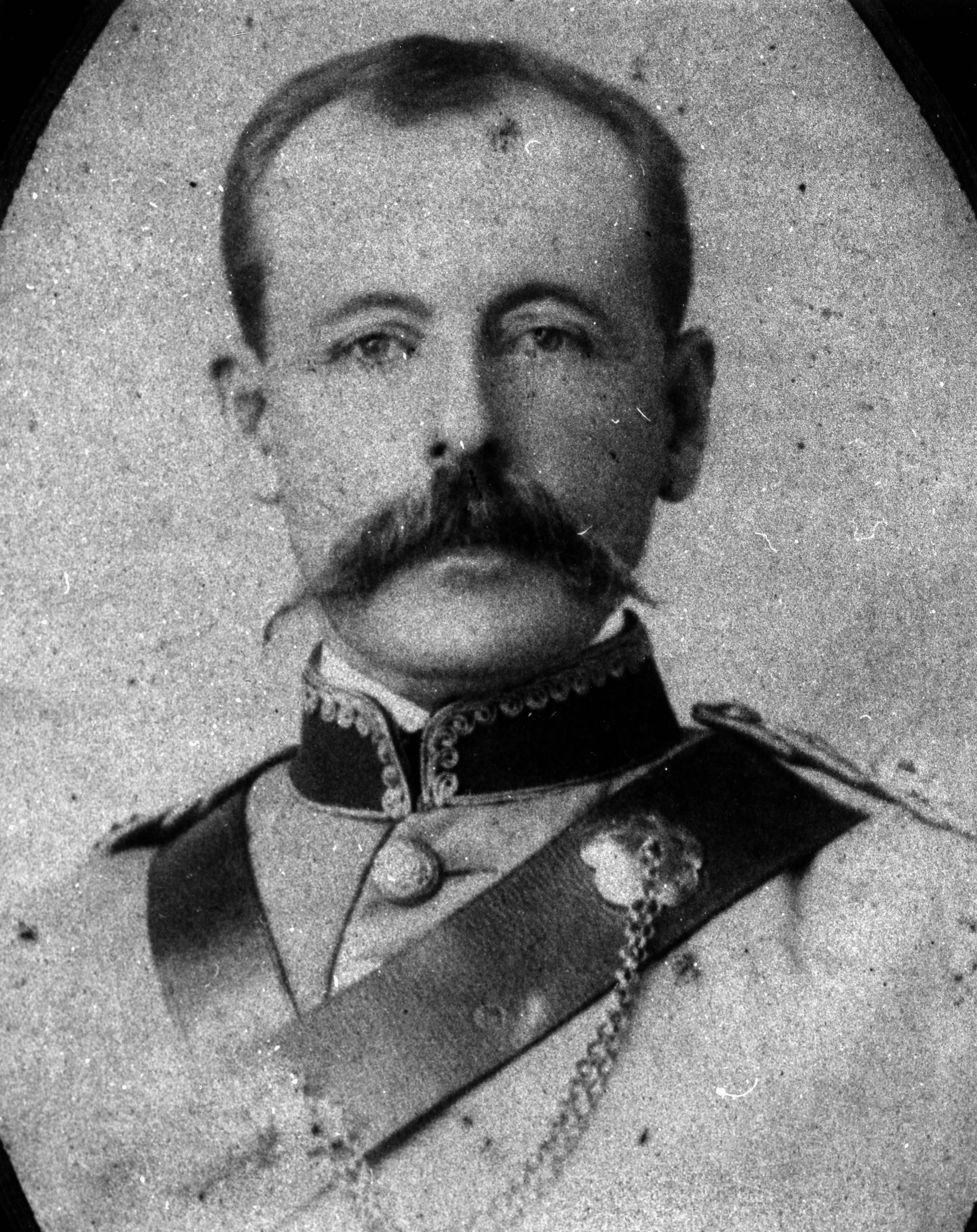
- William Allan in his military uniform, circa 1890s

Member of the Queensland Legislative Assembly for Darling Downs
- In office 29 November 1881 – 1 October 1883
- Preceded by: Francis Kates
- Succeeded by: Francis Kates
- In office 6 September 1887 – 4 May 1888
- Preceded by: William Miles
- Succeeded by: Seat abolished

Member of the Queensland Legislative Assembly for Cunningham
- In office 10 May 1888 – 21 March 1896
- Preceded by: New seat
- Succeeded by: Thomas McGahan

Member of the Queensland Legislative Council
- In office 11 March 1897 – 19 October 1901

Personal details
- Born: William Allan; 1840 Edinburgh, Scotland
- Died: 19 October 1901 (aged 60 or 61) Sydney, Australia
- Resting place: Waverley Cemetery
- Spouse: Emily Ann Mate (m.1871)
- Occupation: Businessman

William Allan (1840—1901) was a pastoralist and politician in Queensland, Australia. He was a Member of the Queensland Legislative Assembly and a Member of the Queensland Legislative Council.

== Business ==
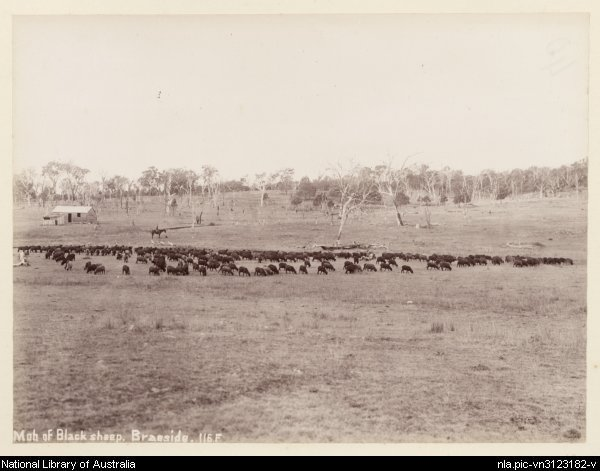
William Allan's black sheep, Braeside, 1894

William Allan owned a pastoral property Braeside located about 12 kilometres (7.5 mi) NNW of Dalveen and 21 kilometres (13 mi) SW of Warwick. He grazed cattle and sheep. He had an active breeding program to create a flock of black Merino sheep. He obtained twice the price for black wool than for white and this compensated for the slightly lower yield of fleece from the black Merino sheep.

== Politics ==
On 1 November 1881, Francis Kates, the member for Darling Downs, resigned. William Allan was elected to the Queensland Legislative Assembly at the resulting by-election on 29 November 1881. He held the seat until the 1883 election). He did not contest the 1883 election as he was returning to the United Kingdom for a holiday for the benefit of his health.

On 22 August 1887, William Miles, the member for Darling Downs, died. Allan won the resulting by-election on 6 September 1887. He held Darling Downs until 5 May 1888 (the 1888 election).

At the 1888 elections, there had been an electoral redistribution, abolishing the electorate of Darling Downs, so Allan contested the new electorate of Cunningham and was elected on 19 May 1888. He held Cunningham until 21 March 1896 (the 1896 election), which he did not contest citing health and business considerations.

On 11 March 1897 he was appointed for life to the Queensland Legislative Council. He served on the Council until his death on 19 October 1901.

One of Allan's political ambitions was to create a railway line from Ipswich to Warwick (via the Fassifern Valley and Cunningham's Gap) and then beyond to St George, Cunnamulla and Thargomindah and across to the South Australian border to facilitate trade with South Australia, bypassing New South Wales. He envisaged that Warwick would be the major railway hub on the Darling Downs. However, this trainway line was never built and it was Toowoomba that became the railway hub on the Darling Downs.

== Later life ==
William Allan had a long history of suffering from asthma and bronchitis which were aggravated by an attack of influenza in September 1901, causing him to take a month's leave of absence from the Queensland Legislative Council to restore his health. He travelled to Sydney hoping it would improve his health, but on arrival his condition worsened and his wife was summoned by telegram. She arrived to be with him when he died on Saturday 19 October 1901 at the Hotel Metropole in Sydney. His funeral was held on Monday 21 September 1901 at St Stephen's Presbyterian Church in Macquarie Street, Sydney, after which he was buried in the Waverley Cemetery. When the Queensland Legislative Council met on Tuesday 22 October, William Allan's death was announced and, following by a series of heartfelt eulogies by fellow Council members, the Council was immediately adjourned to mark their deep sorrow at his death.

His Braeside Homestead is now listed on the Queensland Heritage Register.

== See also ==
- Members of the Queensland Legislative Assembly, 1878–1883; 1883–1888; 1888–1893; 1893–1896
- Members of the Queensland Legislative Council, 1890–1899; 1900–1909

Parliament of Queensland
Preceded by Francis Kates	Member for Darling Downs; 1881–1883	Succeeded by Francis Kates
Preceded by William Miles	Member for Darling Downs; 1887–1888	Abolished
New seat	Member for Cunningham; 1888–1896	Succeeded by Thomas McGahan
