= Edward Wienholt =

Australian politician

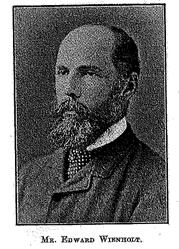

Member of the Queensland Legislative Assembly for Western Downs
- In office 14 September 1870 – 4 November 1873 Serving with Robert Ramsay
- Preceded by: James Taylor
- Succeeded by: Seat abolished

Member of the Queensland Legislative Assembly for Darling Downs
- In office 4 November 1873 – 1 February 1875
- Preceded by: New seat
- Succeeded by: William Graham

Personal details
- Born: Edward Wienholt; 28 March 1833 Laugharne, Carmarthenshire, Wales
- Died: 14 January 1904 (aged 70) Melbourne, Victoria, Australia
- Spouse: Ellen Williams (m.1874 d.1898)
- Relations: Arnold Wienholt Sr. (brother); Arnold Wienholt (son)
- Occupation: Grazier

Edward Wienholt (1833–1904) was a politician in Queensland, Australia. He was a Member of the Queensland Legislative Assembly.

== Politics ==
Wienholt was elected to the Queensland Legislative Assembly in Western Downs at the 1868 colonial election on 14 September. The Western Downs seat was abolished at the 1873 election, and Weinholt contested and won Darling Downs on 4 November 1873. Wienhold was an adherent of Sir Arthur Palmer, who served as Premier of Queensland from 1870 to 1874. Wienhold supported free trade and the rights of landholders, and the restriction of free education. He held the seat until he resigned on 1 February 1875 as he intended to travel to Europe.

== Personal life ==
Edward Wienholt was born in Laugharne, Carmarthenshire, Wales on 28 March 1833, the son of John Birkett Wienholt (1775–1852), a merchant, and his second wife Sarah, née Hill. His brothers Daniel (1822–1865), Arnold (1826–1895) and Arthur (1835–1892), were also prominent pioneers in Queensland. Edward Wienholt arrived in Queensland in 1853.

Edward Wienholt married Ellen Williams (1856–1898) in 1874. They had 3 sons and 3 daughters. Their son Arnold who also went into politics.

With partners he acquired substantial landholdings, which in 1888 amounted to 289,996 acres (117,357 ha) in the Moreton and Darling Downs districts of Queensland. He established the Wienholt Pastoral Estates company in 1889.

Wienholt retired in 1880 and settled in Ross on Wye in Herefordshire, England. He travelled to Australia frequently in his retirement and he died in Melbourne on 14 January 1904.

== See also ==
- Members of the Queensland Legislative Assembly, 1873–1878
- Fassifern Homestead

Parliament of Queensland
Preceded by James Taylor	Member for Western Downs; 1870–1873; Served alongside: Robert Ramsay	Abolished
New seat	Member for Darling Downs; 1873–1875	Succeeded by William Graham
