= 1873 Queensland colonial election =

Elections were held in the Colony of Queensland (now a State of Australia) between 4 November 1873 and 4 December 1873 to elect the members of the Legislative Assembly of Queensland.

== Key dates ==
Due to problems of distance and communications, it was not possible to hold the elections on a single day.

== See also ==
- Members of the Queensland Legislative Assembly, 1873–1878
