= Electoral results for the district of Port Curtis =

Queensland state electoral result

This is a list of electoral results for the electoral district of Port Curtis in Queensland state elections.

== Members for Port Curtis ==
Member	Party	Term
Charles Fitzsimmons	Unaligned	1860–1861
Alfred Sandeman	Unaligned	1861–1863
John Douglas	Unaligned	1863–1866
Sir Arthur Palmer	Unaligned	1866–1878
Albert Norton	Unaligned	1878–1893
Jason Boles	Opposition	1893–1904
Robert Herbertson	Ministerialist/Opposition	1904–1909
Edward Breslin	Labor	1909–1912
John Kessell	Ministerialist	1912–1915
George Carter	Labor	1915–1920
John Fletcher	National	1920–1923
George Carter	Labor	1923–1929
Frank Butler	Country and Progressive National	1929–1932
Tommy Williams	Labor	1932–1947
Jim Burrows	Labor	1947–1963
Martin Hanson	Labor	1963–1976
Bill Prest	Labor	1976–1992

== Election results ==
=== Elections in the 1980s ===
1989 Queensland state election: Port Curtis
Party	Candidate	Votes	%	±%
Labor	Bill Prest	9,016	61.7	+7.9
National	Ron Streeter	3,230	22.1	−19.9
Independent	Eric Bailey	2,083	14.2	+14.2
Independent	Kevin Meyrick	288	2.0	−2.2
Total formal votes		14,617	97.5	−0.8
Informal votes		380	2.5	+0.8
Turnout		14,997	91.7	−0.3
Two-party-preferred result
Labor	Bill Prest	9,750	66.7	+10.8
National	Ron Streeter	4,867	33.3	−10.8
Labor hold		Swing	+10.8	

1986 Queensland state election: Port Curtis
Party	Candidate	Votes	%	±%
Labor	Bill Prest	7,142	53.8	+2.8
National	Colin Brown	5,566	42.0	−1.7
Independent	Kevin Meyrick	556	4.2	+4.2
Total formal votes		13,264	98.3	
Informal votes		231	1.7	
Turnout		13,495	92.0	
Two-party-preferred result
Labor	Bill Prest	7,415	55.9	−0.6
National	Colin Brown	5,849	44.1	+0.6
Labor hold		Swing	−0.6	

1983 Queensland state election: Port Curtis
Party	Candidate	Votes	%	±%
Labor	Bill Prest	8,127	51.0	−2.8
National	Michael Crowley	6,973	43.7	+11.2
Independent	Patricia Cathcart	676	4.2	+4.2
Christian Alternative	Rata Pugh	168	1.1	+1.1
Total formal votes		15,944	98.7	−0.3
Informal votes		204	1.3	+0.3
Turnout		16,148	91.8	+1.4
Two-party-preferred result
Labor	Bill Prest	8,549	53.6	−4.0
National	Michael Crowley	7,395	46.4	+4.0
Labor hold		Swing	−4.0	

1980 Queensland state election: Port Curtis
Party	Candidate	Votes	%	±%
Labor	Bill Prest	7,191	53.8	−4.8
National	Michael Crowley	4,341	32.5	+9.8
Liberal	John Mawer	1,656	12.4	−2.6
Liberal	Georgina Pickers	175	1.3	+1.3
Total formal votes		13,363	99.0	−0.1
Informal votes		133	1.0	+0.1
Turnout		13,496	90.4	−1.8
Two-party-preferred result
Labor	Bill Prest	7,695	57.6	−4.2
National	Michael Crowley	5,668	42.4	+4.2
Labor hold		Swing	−4.2	

=== Elections in the 1970s ===
1977 Queensland state election: Port Curtis
Party	Candidate	Votes	%	±%
Labor	Bill Prest	7,048	58.6	−4.5
National	Barry Johnson	2,732	22.7	+4.5
Liberal	John Mawer	1,805	15.0	−3.6
Progress	Michael Berry	449	3.7	+3.7
Total formal votes		12,034	99.1	
Informal votes		107	0.9	
Turnout		12,141	92.2	
Two-party-preferred result
Labor	Bill Prest	7,436	61.8	−3.1
National	Barry Johnson	4,598	38.2	+3.1
Labor hold		Swing	−3.1	

1976 Port Curtis state by-election
Party	Candidate	Votes	%	±%
Labor	Bill Prest	7,846	51.8	−11.3
National	Maurice Elliot	3,625	23.9	+5.7
Liberal	John Mawer	1,941	12.8	−5.8
Independent	Lloyd Curtis	1,749	11.5	+11.5
Total formal votes		15,181	99.1	+0.5
Informal votes		135	0.9	−0.5
Turnout		15,296	86.6	−2.7
Labor hold		Swing	N/A	

- Preferences were not distributed.

1974 Queensland state election: Port Curtis
Party	Candidate	Votes	%	±%
Labor	Martin Hanson	9,738	63.1	−19.1
Liberal	Douglas Cuddy	2,878	18.6	+18.6
National	Francis Waterson	2,817	18.2	+18.2
Total formal votes		15,433	98.6	+0.7
Informal votes		212	1.4	−0.7
Turnout		15,645	89.3	−2.3
Two-party-preferred result
Labor	Martin Hanson	10,132	65.7	−16.5
Liberal	Douglas Cuddy	5,301	34.3	+34.3
Labor hold		Swing	−16.5	

1972 Queensland state election: Port Curtis
Party	Candidate	Votes	%	±%
Labor	Martin Hanson	10,652	82.2	+0.9
Queensland Labor	Marguerita Glen	1,771	18.7	−0.9
Total formal votes		12,959	97.9	
Informal votes		278	2.1	
Turnout		13,237	91.6	
Labor hold		Swing	+0.9	

=== Elections in the 1960s ===
1969 Queensland state election: Port Curtis
Party	Candidate	Votes	%	±%
Labor	Martin Hanson	7,705	81.3	+11.3
Queensland Labor	Marguerita Glen	1,771	18.7	+18.7
Total formal votes		9,476	97.5	−1.8
Informal votes		244	2.5	+1.8
Turnout		9,720	91.2	−3.4
Labor hold		Swing	+9.8	

1966 Queensland state election: Port Curtis
Party	Candidate	Votes	%	±%
Labor	Martin Hanson	6,012	70.0	−10.4
Country	James Grant	1,526	17.8	+17.8
Liberal	John McGree	1,056	12.3	+12.3
Total formal votes		8,594	99.3	+1.1
Informal votes		57	0.7	−1.1
Turnout		8,651	94.6	−1.5
Two-party-preferred result
Labor	Martin Hanson	6,160	71.5	−11.1
Country	James Grant	2,434	28.5	+28.5
Labor hold		Swing	−11.1	

1963 Queensland state election: Port Curtis
Party	Candidate	Votes	%	±%
Labor	Martin Hanson	6,765	80.4	+11.8
Queensland Labor	Doug McClarty	1,275	15.2	+15.2
Independent	Tom Kelly	370	4.4	+4.4
Total formal votes		8,410	98.2	−0.6
Informal votes		152	1.8	+0.6
Turnout		8,562	96.1	+1.0
Two-candidate-preferred result
Labor	Martin Hanson	6,950	82.6	+14.0
Queensland Labor	Doug McClarty	1,460	17.4	+17.4
Labor hold		Swing	+14.0	

1960 Queensland state election: Port Curtis
Party	Candidate	Votes	%	±%
Labor	Jim Burrows	6,033	68.6	
Independent	Desmond Neill-Ballantine	2,773	31.4	
Total formal votes		8,806	98.8	
Informal votes		108	1.2	
Turnout		8,914	95.1	
Labor hold		Swing		

=== Elections in the 1950s ===
1957 Queensland state election: Port Curtis
Party	Candidate	Votes	%	±%
Labor	Jim Burrows	4,757	49.4	−15.1
Country	Colin Wilson	3,460	35.9	+0.4
Queensland Labor	Samuel Andrewartha	1,412	14.7	+14.7
Total formal votes		9,629	99.5	+0.2
Informal votes		46	0.5	−0.2
Turnout		9,675	96.2	+1.6
Labor hold		Swing	−6.6	

1956 Queensland state election: Port Curtis
Party	Candidate	Votes	%	±%
Labor	Jim Burrows	6,092	64.5	−3.3
Country	Thomas Pulsford	3,353	35.5	+3.3
Total formal votes		9,445	99.3	+0.1
Informal votes		68	0.7	−0.1
Turnout		9,513	94.6	−0.7
Labor hold		Swing	−3.3	

1953 Queensland state election: Port Curtis
Party	Candidate	Votes	%	±%
Labor	Jim Burrows	6,241	67.8	+10.0
Liberal	Julia Hinds	2,970	32.2	−10.0
Total formal votes		9,211	99.2	0.0
Informal votes		69	0.8	0.0
Turnout		9,280	95.3	+0.6
Labor hold		Swing	+10.0	

1950 Queensland state election: Port Curtis
Party	Candidate	Votes	%	±%
Labor	Jim Burrows	5,296	57.8	
Liberal	Harold Jensen	3,871	42.2	
Total formal votes		9,167	99.2	
Informal votes		70	0.8	
Turnout		9,237	94.7	
Labor hold		Swing		

=== Elections in the 1940s ===
1947 Queensland state election: Port Curtis
Party	Candidate	Votes	%	±%
Labor	Jim Burrows	4,199	41.4	−17.9
Country	William McGreever	3,871	38.2	−2.5
Frank Barnes Labor	Peter Neilson	1,520	15.0	+15.0
Independent	Alec Paterson	432	4.3	+4.3
Independent	John Daly	120	1.2	+1.2
Total formal votes		10,142	99.2	+0.3
Informal votes		85	0.8	−0.3
Turnout		10,227	92.5	+5.1
Labor hold		Swing	−7.3	

1944 Queensland state election: Port Curtis
Party	Candidate	Votes	%	±%
Labor	Tommy Williams	5,761	59.3	−5.0
Country	Samuel Halpin	3,955	40.7	+5.0
Total formal votes		9,716	98.9	0.0
Informal votes		103	1.1	0.0
Turnout		9,819	87.4	−3.4
Labor hold		Swing	−5.0	

1941 Queensland state election: Port Curtis
Party	Candidate	Votes	%	±%
Labor	Tommy Williams	6,677	64.3	+7.1
Country	Geoffrey Nichols	3,709	35.7	−7.1
Total formal votes		10,386	98.9	0.0
Informal votes		114	1.1	0.0
Turnout		10,500	90.8	−2.4
Labor hold		Swing	+7.1	

=== Elections in the 1930s ===
1938 Queensland state election: Port Curtis
Party	Candidate	Votes	%	±%
Labor	Tommy Williams	5,452	57.1	+2.1
Country	James Heading	4,102	42.9	+11.3
Total formal votes		9,554	98.9	+1.9
Informal votes		108	1.1	−1.9
Turnout		9,662	93.2	−2.7
Labor hold		Swing	N/A	

1935 Queensland state election: Port Curtis
Party	Candidate	Votes	%	±%
Labor	Tommy Williams	4,800	55.0	
CPNP	Robert Boyd	2,759	31.6	
Social Credit	William Gresham	1,172	13.4	
Total formal votes		8,731	97.0	
Informal votes		269	3.0	
Turnout		9,000	95.9	
Labor hold		Swing		

- Preferences were not distributed.

1932 Queensland state election: Port Curtis
Party	Candidate	Votes	%	±%
Labor	Tommy Williams	3,805	51.2	
CPNP	Frank Butler	3,625	48.8	
Total formal votes		7,430	99.5	
Informal votes		39	0.5	
Turnout		7,469	94.9	
Labor gain from CPNP		Swing		

=== Elections in the 1920s ===
1929 Queensland state election: Port Curtis
Party	Candidate	Votes	%	±%
CPNP	Frank Butler	3,550	55.6	+12.1
Labor	George Carter	2,829	44.4	−1.2
Total formal votes		6,379	99.1	+0.2
Informal votes		58	0.9	−0.2
Turnout		6,437	94.3	+3.4
CPNP gain from Labor		Swing	+7.1	

1926 Queensland state election: Port Curtis
Party	Candidate	Votes	%	±%
Labor	George Carter	2,849	45.6	−7.2
CPNP	Walter Prizeman	2,717	43.5	−0.4
Communist	Fred Paterson	676	10.8	+10.8
Total formal votes		6,242	98.9	−0.4
Informal votes		68	1.1	+0.4
Turnout		6,310	90.9	+0.1
Two-party-preferred result
Labor	George Carter	2,945	51.5	
CPNP	Walter Prizeman	2,769	48.5	
Labor hold		Swing	N/A	

1923 Queensland state election: Port Curtis
Party	Candidate	Votes	%	±%
Labor	George Carter	3,316	52.8	+5.3
United	John Fletcher	2,760	43.9	−8.9
Independent	James Murray	210	3.3	+3.3
Total formal votes		6,286	99.3	−0.3
Informal votes		46	0.7	+0.3
Turnout		6,332	90.8	+3.8
Labor gain from United		Swing	N/A	

1920 Queensland state election: Port Curtis
Party	Candidate	Votes	%	±%
National	John Fletcher	2,157	52.5	+5.4
Labor	George Carter	1,953	47.5	−5.4
Total formal votes		4,110	99.6	+0.3
Informal votes		15	0.4	−0.3
Turnout		4,125	87.0	+1.3
National gain from Labor		Swing	+5.4	

=== Elections in the 1910s ===
1918 Queensland state election: Port Curtis
Party	Candidate	Votes	%	±%
Labor	George Carter	2,165	52.9	+2.2
National	John Kessell	1,929	47.1	−2.2
Total formal votes		4,094	99.3	−0.2
Informal votes		29	0.7	+0.2
Turnout		4,123	85.7	−5.0
Labor hold		Swing	+2.2	

1915 Queensland state election: Port Curtis
Party	Candidate	Votes	%	±%
Labor	George Carter	1,881	50.7	+0.7
Liberal	John Kessell	1,828	49.3	−0.7
Total formal votes		3,709	99.5	+0.7
Informal votes		20	0.5	−0.7
Turnout		3,729	90.7	+12.3
Labor gain from Liberal		Swing	+0.7	

1912 Port Curtis state by-election
Party	Candidate	Votes	%	±%
Liberal	John Kessell	1,512	51.6	+1.6
Labor	Edward Breslin	1,416	48.4	−1.6
Total formal votes		2,928	99.2	+0.4
Informal votes		23	0.8	−0.4
Turnout		2,951	70.6	+7.8
Liberal gain from Labor		Swing	+1.6	

1912 Queensland state election: Port Curtis
Party	Candidate	Votes	%	±%
Labor	Edward Breslin	1,590	50.03	
Liberal	John Kessell	1,588	49.97	
Total formal votes		3,178	98.8	
Informal votes		39	1.2	
Turnout		3,217	78.4	
Labor hold		Swing		
