= Results of the 1912 Queensland state election =

Queensland state election, 27 April 1912 Legislative Assembly << 1909–1915 >>
Enrolled voters	309,590				
Votes cast	216,032		Turnout	75.52	+2.85
Informal votes	N/A		Informal	N/A	N/A
Summary of votes by party
Party	Primary votes	%	Swing	Seats	Change
Liberal	110,981	51.37	+0.46	46	+5
Labor	100,878	46.70	+9.85	25	–2
Independent	3,766	1.74	+0.14	1	+1
Total	216,032			72	

This is a list of electoral district results for the 1912 Queensland state election in Australia.

At the time, the voting system in Queensland was based on contingency voting, which was similar to the modern optional preferential voting system. In electorates with 3 or more candidates, preferences were not distributed if a candidate received more than 50% of the primary vote.

If none received more than 50%, all except the top two candidates were eliminated from the count and their preferences distributed between the two leaders, with the one receiving the most votes declared the winner.

== Results by electoral district ==
=== Albert ===
1912 Queensland state election: Albert
Party	Candidate	Votes	%	±%
Liberal	John Appel	unopposed		
Liberal hold		Swing		

=== Aubigny ===
1912 Queensland state election: Aubigny
Party	Candidate	Votes	%	±%
Liberal	Alfred Luke	2,287	69.2	
Labor	John Connelly	1,020	30.8	
Total formal votes		3,307	98.6	
Informal votes		48	1.4	
Turnout		3,355	71.9	
Liberal hold		Swing		

=== Balonne ===
1912 Queensland state election: Balonne
Party	Candidate	Votes	%	±%
Labor	Edward Land	1,387	68.6	
Liberal	Jasper Harvey	635	31.4	
Total formal votes		2,022	96.9	
Informal votes		64	3.1	
Turnout		2,086	56.3	
Labor hold		Swing		

=== Barcoo ===
1912 Queensland state election: Barcoo
Party	Candidate	Votes	%	±%
Labor	T.J. Ryan	1,649	72.3	
Liberal	Albert Catchlove	633	27.7	
Total formal votes		2,282	98.4	
Informal votes		38	1.6	
Turnout		2,320	65.3	
Labor hold		Swing		

=== Bowen ===
1912 Queensland state election: Bowen
Party	Candidate	Votes	%	±%
Liberal	Edwin Caine	1,868	55.1	
Labor	Myles Ferricks	1,519	44.9	
Total formal votes		3,387	98.8	
Total formal votes		42	1.2	
Turnout		3,429	76.4	
Liberal gain from Labor		Swing		

=== Bremer ===
1912 Queensland state election: Bremer
Party	Candidate	Votes	%	±%
Liberal	James Cribb	1,860	50.2	
Labor	William Hefferan	1,844	49.8	
Total formal votes		3,704	99.0	
Informal votes		36	1.0	
Turnout		3,740	81.6	
Liberal hold		Swing		

=== Brisbane ===
1912 Queensland state election: Brisbane
Party	Candidate	Votes	%	±%
Labor	Mick Kirwan	2,281	50.4	
Liberal	Edward Forrest	2,249	49.6	
Total formal votes		4,530	98.9	
Informal votes		51	1.1	
Turnout		4,581	73.3	
Labor gain from Liberal		Swing		

=== Bulimba ===
1912 Queensland state election: Bulimba
Party	Candidate	Votes	%	±%
Liberal	Walter Barnes	2,315	56.9	
Labor	Hugh McMinn	1,752	43.1	
Total formal votes		4,067	99.4	
Informal votes		23	0.6	
Turnout		4,090	85.7	
Liberal hold		Swing		

=== Bundaberg ===
1912 Queensland state election: Bundaberg
Party	Candidate	Votes	%	±%
Labor	George Barber	1,926	55.7	
Liberal	James Macleod	1,531	44.3	
Total formal votes		3,457	99.4	
Informal votes		22	0.6	
Turnout		3,479	83.2	
Labor hold		Swing		

=== Buranda ===
1912 Queensland state election: Buranda
Party	Candidate	Votes	%	±%
Labor	John Huxham	2,276	55.5	
Liberal	William Stephens	1,824	44.5	
Total formal votes		4,100	99.3	
Informal votes		27	0.7	
Turnout		4,127	87.5	
Labor gain from Liberal		Swing		

=== Burke ===
1912 Queensland state election: Burke
Party	Candidate	Votes	%	±%
Independent	William Murphy	1,174	53.5	
Labor	Charles Collins	1,020	46.5	
Total formal votes		2,194	99.0	
Informal votes		21	1.0	
Turnout		2,215	70.7	
Independent gain from Labor		Swing		

=== Burnett ===
1912 Queensland state election: Burnett
Party	Candidate	Votes	%	±%
Liberal	Bernard Corser	1,603	53.1	
Labor	Alfred Jones	1,415	46.9	
Total formal votes		3,018	98.3	
Informal votes		53	1.7	
Turnout		3,071	78.0	
Liberal hold		Swing		

=== Burrum ===
1912 Queensland state election: Burrum
Party	Candidate	Votes	%	±%
Liberal	Colin Rankin	1,623	58.4	
Labor	Albert Whitford	1,157	41.6	
Total formal votes		2,780	99.1	
Informal votes		26	0.9	
Turnout		2,806	71.3	
Liberal hold		Swing		

=== Cairns ===
1912 Queensland state election: Cairns
Party	Candidate	Votes	%	±%
Labor	William McCormack	1,411	51.3	
Independent	John Mann	1,341	48.7	
Total formal votes		2,752	98.7	
Informal votes		37	1.3	
Turnout		3,241	77.9	
Labor gain from Independent		Swing		

=== Carnarvon ===
1912 Queensland state election: Carnarvon
Party	Candidate	Votes	%	±%
Liberal	Donald Gunn	1,793	55.6	
Labor	Tom Crawford	1,430	44.4	
Total formal votes		3,223	99.4	
Informal votes		18	0.6	
Turnout		3,241	77.9	
Liberal hold		Swing		

=== Charters Towers ===
1912 Queensland state election: Charters Towers
Party	Candidate	Votes	%	±%
Liberal	Robert Williams	1,569	53.3	
Labor	John Mullan	1,374	46.7	
Total formal votes		2,943	98.6	
Informal votes		42	1.4	
Turnout		2,985	82.9	
Liberal gain from Labor		Swing		

=== Chillagoe ===
1912 Queensland state election: Chillagoe
Party	Candidate	Votes	%	±%
Labor	Ted Theodore	1,774	75.1	
Liberal	Archibald Frew	588	24.9	
Total formal votes		2,362	97.4	
Informal votes		64	2.6	
Turnout		2,426	69.9	
Labor hold		Swing		

=== Cook ===
1912 Queensland state election: Cook
Party	Candidate	Votes	%	±%
Liberal	Henry Douglas	1,393	58.3	
Labor	Harry Ryan	996	41.7	
Total formal votes		2,389	99.2	
Informal votes		20	0.8	
Turnout		2,409	76.9	
Liberal hold		Swing		

=== Cooroora ===
1912 Queensland state election: Cooroora
Party	Candidate	Votes	%	±%
Liberal	Harry Walker	2,206	64.5	
Labor	William Jones	1,216	35.5	
Total formal votes		3,422	99.1	
Informal votes		31	0.9	
Turnout		3,453	75.0	
Liberal hold		Swing		

=== Cunningham ===
1912 Queensland state election: Cunningham
Party	Candidate	Votes	%	±%
Liberal	Francis Grayson	2,049	75.7	
Labor	Percy McCawley	656	24.3	
Total formal votes		2,705	98.8	
Informal votes		33	1.2	
Turnout		2,738	67.0	
Liberal hold		Swing		

=== Dalby ===
1912 Queensland state election: Dalby
Party	Candidate	Votes	%	±%
Liberal	William Vowles	1,992	57.1	
Labor	Robert Turnbull	1,497	42.9	
Total formal votes		3,489	99.5	
Informal votes		19	0.5	
Turnout		3,508	75.4	
Liberal hold		Swing		

=== Drayton ===
1912 Queensland state election: Drayton
Party	Candidate	Votes	%	±%
Liberal	William Bebbington	1,962	62.2	
Labor	James Desmond	1,040	33.0	
Independent	William Binns	151	4.8	
Total formal votes		3,153	98.8	
Informal votes		38	1.2	
Turnout		3,191	75.8	
Liberal hold		Swing		

=== Eacham ===
1912 Queensland state election: Eacham
Party	Candidate	Votes	%	±%
Labor	William Gillies	1,254	52.4	
Liberal	Michael Woods	1,141	47.6	
Total formal votes		2,395	98.4	
Informal votes		38	1.6	
Turnout		2,433	76.9	
Labor gain from Liberal		Swing		

=== East Toowoomba ===
1912 Queensland state election: East Toowoomba
Party	Candidate	Votes	%	±%
Liberal	Robert Roberts	1,851	55.7	
Labor	George Walden	1,473	44.3	
Total formal votes		3,324	99.3	
Informal votes		22	0.7	
Turnout		3,346	74.5	
Liberal hold		Swing		

=== Enoggera ===
1912 Queensland state election: Enoggera
Party	Candidate	Votes	%	±%
Liberal	Richard Trout	2,076	53.4	
Labor	William Lloyd	1,814	46.6	
Total formal votes		3,890	99.6	
Informal votes		15	0.4	
Turnout		3,905	87.0	
Liberal hold		Swing		

=== Fassifern ===
1912 Queensland state election: Fassifern
Party	Candidate	Votes	%	±%
Liberal	Arnold Wienholt	unopposed		
Liberal hold		Swing		

==== By-election ====
- Caused by the resignation of Arnold Wienholt

1913 Fassifern state by-election
Party	Candidate	Votes	%	±%
Liberal	Ernest Bell	2,130	72.6	−27.4
Labor	Arthur Laban	508	17.3	+17.3
Liberal	Charles Jenkinson	294	10.0	10.0
Total formal votes		2,932	98.8	
Informal votes		35	1.2	
Turnout		2,967		
Liberal hold		Swing	N/A	

=== Fitzroy ===
1912 Queensland state election: Fitzroy
Party	Candidate	Votes	%	±%
Liberal	Kenneth Grant	1,925	58.8	
Labor	Charles Bluett	1,348	41.2	
Total formal votes		3,273	97.0	
Informal votes		101	3.0	
Turnout		3,374	74.0	
Liberal hold		Swing		

=== Flinders ===
1912 Queensland state election: Flinders
Party	Candidate	Votes	%	±%
Labor	John May	unopposed		
Labor hold		Swing		

=== Fortitude Valley ===
1912 Queensland state election: Fortitude Valley
Party	Candidate	Votes	%	±%
Labor	David Bowman	2,456	60.0	
Liberal	Edwin Fowles	1,640	40.0	
Total formal votes		4,096	99.2	
Informal votes		34	0.8	
Turnout		4,130	83.6	
Labor hold		Swing		

=== Gregory ===
1912 Queensland state election: Gregory
Party	Candidate	Votes	%	±%
Labor	William Hamilton	1,249	74.4	
Liberal	Francis North	429	25.6	
Total formal votes		1,678	96.4	
Informal votes		63	3.6	
Turnout		1,741	46.6	
Labor hold		Swing		

=== Gympie ===
1912 Queensland state election: Gympie
Party	Candidate	Votes	%	±%
Liberal	George Mackay	1,529	45.7	
Labor	George Ryland	1,409	42.1	
Independent Labor	Daniel Mulcahy	407	12.2	
Total formal votes		3,345	98.7	
Informal votes		44	1.3	
Turnout		3,389	80.1	
Two-party-preferred result
Liberal	George Mackay	1,581	52.7	
Labor	George Ryland	1,417	47.3	
Liberal gain from Labor		Swing		

=== Herbert ===
1912 Queensland state election: Herbert
Party	Candidate	Votes	%	±%
Labor	William Lennon	1,472	56.7	
Liberal	Frederick O'Rourke	1,124	43.3	
Total formal votes		2,596	99.4	
Informal votes		15	0.6	
Turnout		2,611	67.3	
Labor hold		Swing		

=== Ipswich ===
1912 Queensland state election: Ipswich
Party	Candidate	Votes	%	±%
Liberal	James Blair	2,145	53.1	
Labor	William Ryott Maughan	1,897	46.9	
Total formal votes		4,042	99.1	
Informal votes		35	0.9	
Turnout		4,077	77.2	
Liberal hold		Swing		

=== Ithaca ===
1912 Queensland state election: Ithaca
Party	Candidate	Votes	%	±%
Labor	John Gilday	2,266	55.2	
Liberal	Arthur Hawthorn	1,837	44.8	
Total formal votes		4,103	99.3	
Informal votes		27	0.7	
Turnout		4,130	87.1	
Labor gain from Liberal		Swing		

=== Kennedy ===
1912 Queensland state election: Kennedy
Party	Candidate	Votes	%	±%
Labor	James O'Sullivan	1,445	57.5	
Liberal	Osborn Fenwick	1,070	42.5	
Total formal votes		2,515	97.8	
Informal votes		56	2.2	
Turnout		2,571	77.5	
Labor hold		Swing		

=== Keppel ===
1912 Queensland state election: Keppel
Party	Candidate	Votes	%	±%
Labor	James Larcombe	1,432	50.0	
Liberal	James Brennan	1,269	44.3	
Independent Liberal	Frank Lennon	164	5.7	
Total formal votes		2,865	98.2	
Informal votes		52	1.8	
Turnout		2,917	74.6	
Two-party-preferred result
Labor	James Larcombe	1,448	52.4	
Liberal	James Brennan	1,313	47.6	
Labor gain from Liberal		Swing		

=== Kurilpa ===
1912 Queensland state election: Kurilpa
Party	Candidate	Votes	%	±%
Liberal	James Allan	2,204	55.5	
Labor	James Sharpe	1,765	44.5	
Total formal votes		3,969	99.4	
Informal votes		22	0.6	
Turnout		3,991	83.6	
Liberal hold		Swing		

=== Leichhardt ===
1912 Queensland state election: Leichhardt
Party	Candidate	Votes	%	±%
Labor	Herbert Hardacre	1,702	74.8	
Liberal	William Fox	575	25.2	
Total formal votes		2,277	98.4	
Informal votes		36	1.6	
Turnout		2,313	61.9	
Labor hold		Swing		

=== Lockyer ===
1912 Queensland state election: Lockyer
Party	Candidate	Votes	%	±%
Liberal	William Drayton Armstrong	unopposed		
Liberal hold		Swing		

=== Logan ===
1912 Queensland state election: Logan
Party	Candidate	Votes	%	±%
Liberal	James Stodart	2,127	68.7	
Labor	Wolfgang Arnold	971	31.3	
Total formal votes		3,098	98.9	
Informal votes		34	1.1	
Turnout		3,132	77.6	
Liberal hold		Swing		

=== Mackay ===
1912 Queensland state election: Mackay
Party	Candidate	Votes	%	±%
Liberal	Walter Paget	1,937	62.1	
Labor	Charles Tait	1,182	37.9	
Total formal votes		3,119	96.1	
Informal votes		127	3.9	
Turnout		3,246	69.5	
Liberal hold		Swing		

=== Maranoa ===
1912 Queensland state election: Maranoa
Party	Candidate	Votes	%	±%
Labor	John Hunter	1,819	62.4	
Liberal	Aaron Hoskin	1,095	37.6	
Total formal votes		2,914	99.1	
Informal votes		26	0.9	
Turnout		2,940	70.4	
Labor hold		Swing		

=== Maree ===
1912 Queensland state election: Maree
Party	Candidate	Votes	%	±%
Labor	William Bertram	2,096	51.2	
Liberal	David Hunter	2,000	48.8	
Total formal votes		4,096	98.7	
Informal votes		53	1.3	
Turnout		4,149	84.2	
Labor gain from Liberal		Swing		

=== Maryborough ===
1912 Queensland state election: Maryborough
Party	Candidate	Votes	%	±%
Liberal	Edward Corser	1,750	50.1	
Labor	William Mitchell	1,740	49.9	
Total formal votes		3,490	98.6	
Informal votes		48	1.4	
Turnout		3,538	79.0	
Liberal hold		Swing		

==== By-election ====
- Election was voided by the Court of Disputed Returns.
- This by-election was held on 12 October 1912.

1912 Maryborough state by-election
Party	Candidate	Votes	%	±%
Liberal	Edward Corser	1,791	50.02	−0.08
Labor	William Mitchell	1,789	49.98	+0.08
Total formal votes		3,580	99.6	+1.0
Informal votes		16	0.4	−1.0
Turnout		3,596	80.2	+1.2
Liberal hold		Swing	−0.08	

=== Merthyr ===
1912 Queensland state election: Merthyr
Party	Candidate	Votes	%	±%
Liberal	Thomas Welsby	2,119	50.05	
Labor	Peter McLachlan	2,115	49.95	
Total formal votes		4,234	98.9	
Informal votes		47	1.1	
Turnout		4,281	85.5	
Liberal hold		Swing		

=== Mirani ===
1912 Queensland state election: Mirani
Party	Candidate	Votes	%	±%
Liberal	Edward Swayne	1,730	68.8	
Labor	Philip Kirwan	785	31.2	
Total formal votes		2,515	98.6	
Informal votes		36	1.4	
Turnout		2,551	63.9	
Liberal hold		Swing		

=== Mitchell ===
1912 Queensland state election: Mitchell
Party	Candidate	Votes	%	±%
Labor	John Payne	1,394	71.8	
Liberal	John Cross	547	28.2	
Total formal votes		1,941	97.9	
Informal votes		42	2.1	
Turnout		1,983	52.7	
Labor hold		Swing		

=== Mount Morgan ===
1912 Queensland state election: Mount Morgan
Party	Candidate	Votes	%	±%
Liberal	James Crawford	1,874	53.0	
Labor	James Stopford	1,659	47.0	
Total formal votes		3,533	99.5	
Informal votes		19	0.5	
Turnout		3,552	77.7	
Liberal hold		Swing		

=== Mundingburra ===
1912 Queensland state election: Mundingburra
Party	Candidate	Votes	%	±%
Labor	Thomas Foley	1,974	61.7	
Liberal	William Little	1,226	38.3	
Total formal votes		3,200	98.9	
Informal votes		34	1.1	
Turnout		3,234	76.3	
Labor hold		Swing		

=== Murilla ===
1912 Queensland state election: Murilla
Party	Candidate	Votes	%	±%
Liberal	Godfrey Morgan	1,725	56.2	
Labor	Frank Allen	1,346	43.8	
Total formal votes		3,071	97.6	
Informal votes		74	2.4	
Turnout		3,145	72.8	
Liberal hold		Swing		

=== Murrumba ===
1912 Queensland state election: Murrumba
Party	Candidate	Votes	%	±%
Liberal	James Forsythe	2,400	77.7	
Labor	Gideon Dennis	688	22.3	
Total formal votes		3,088	99.1	
Informal votes		29	0.9	
Turnout		3,117	71.1	
Liberal hold		Swing		

=== Musgrave ===
1912 Queensland state election: Musgrave
Party	Candidate	Votes	%	±%
Liberal	John White	1,569	56.9	
Labor	Henry Cattermull	1,188	43.1	
Total formal votes		2,757	98.5	
Informal votes		41	1.5	
Turnout		2,798	78.3	
Liberal hold		Swing		

=== Nanango ===
1912 Queensland state election: Nanango
Party	Candidate	Votes	%	±%
Liberal	Robert Hodge	2,379	63.8	
Labor	Maurice Harland	1,348	36.2	
Total formal votes		3,727	98.7	
Informal votes		48	1.3	
Turnout		3,775	69.5	
Liberal hold		Swing		

=== Normanby ===
1912 Queensland state election: Normanby
Party	Candidate	Votes	%	±%
Liberal	George Fox	1,490	60.7	
Labor	George Martens	966	39.3	
Total formal votes		2,456	97.3	
Informal votes		69	2.7	
Turnout		2,525	68.3	
Liberal hold		Swing		

==== By-election ====
- This by-election was caused by the death of George Fox.
- It was held on 5 March 1914.

1914 Normanby state by-election
Party	Candidate	Votes	%	±%
Liberal	Edward Archer	1,105	53.6	−7.1
Labor	Joseph Whiteley	971	46.4	+7.1
Total formal votes		2,051	98.7	+1.4
Informal votes		25	1.3	−1.4
Turnout		2,076	63.0	−5.3
Liberal hold		Swing	−7.1	

=== Nundah ===
1912 Queensland state election: Nundah
Party	Candidate	Votes	%	±%
Liberal	Thomas Bridges	2,301	65.1	
Labor	Robert McCormack	1,232	34.9	
Total formal votes		3,533	99.5	
Informal votes		17	0.5	
Turnout		3,550	79.9	
Liberal hold		Swing		

=== Oxley ===
1912 Queensland state election: Oxley
Party	Candidate	Votes	%	±%
Liberal	Digby Denham	2,213	58.3	
Labor	Charles Martin	1,580	41.7	
Total formal votes		3,793	99.5	
Informal votes		20	0.5	
Turnout		3,813	85.6	
Liberal hold		Swing		

=== Paddington ===
1912 Queensland state election: Paddington
Party	Candidate	Votes	%	±%
Labor	John Fihelly	2,678	57.6	
Liberal	John Walsh	1,973	42.4	
Total formal votes		4,651	98.8	
Informal votes		58	1.2	
Turnout		4,709	84.6	
Labor gain from Liberal		Swing		

=== Pittsworth ===
1912 Queensland state election: Pittsworth
Party	Candidate	Votes	%	±%
Liberal	Donald Mackintosh	1,850	60.6	
Labor	Matthias Dwyer	1,204	39.4	
Total formal votes		3,054	99.6	
Informal votes		13	0.4	
Turnout		3,067	73.2	
Liberal hold		Swing		

=== Port Curtis ===
1912 Queensland state election: Port Curtis
Party	Candidate	Votes	%	±%
Labor	Edward Breslin	1,590	50.03	
Liberal	John Kessell	1,588	49.97	
Total formal votes		3,178	98.8	
Informal votes		39	1.2	
Turnout		3,217	78.4	
Labor hold		Swing		

==== By-election ====
- This result was overturned by the Court of Disputed Returns and a by-election was held on 26 October 1912.

1912 Port Curtis state by-election
Party	Candidate	Votes	%	±%
Liberal	John Kessell	1,512	51.6	+1.6
Labor	Edward Breslin	1,416	48.4	−1.6
Total formal votes		2,928	99.2	+0.4
Informal votes		23	0.8	−0.4
Turnout		2,951	70.6	+7.8
Liberal gain from Labor		Swing	+1.6	

=== Queenton ===
1912 Queensland state election: Queenton
Party	Candidate	Votes	%	±%
Labor	Vern Winstanley	1,704	58.6	
Liberal	Frederick Johnson	1,202	41.4	
Total formal votes		2,906	99.6	
Informal votes		12	0.4	
Turnout		2,918	81.4	
Labor hold		Swing		

=== Rockhampton ===
1912 Queensland state election: Rockhampton
Party	Candidate	Votes	%	±%
Labor	John Adamson	1,705	55.5	
Liberal	George Curtis	1,366	44.5	
Total formal votes		3,071	99.1	
Informal votes		27	0.9	
Turnout		3,098	67.0	
Labor hold		Swing		

=== Rosewood ===
1912 Queensland state election: Rosewood
Party	Candidate	Votes	%	±%
Liberal	Henry Stevens	1,412	44.1	
Independent	William Ruhno	941	29.4	
Labor	Patrick Madden	687	21.5	
Independent	John Rea	159	5.0	
Total formal votes		3,199	99.4	
Informal votes		19	0.6	
Turnout		3,218	79.1	
Two-candidate-preferred result
Liberal	Henry Stevens	1,468	58.0	
Independent	William Ruhno	1,062	42.0	
Liberal hold		Swing		

=== South Brisbane ===
1912 Queensland state election: South Brisbane
Party	Candidate	Votes	%	±%
Liberal	Thomas Bouchard	1,914	50.4	
Labor	Joseph Sherry	1,882	49.6	
Total formal votes		3,796	99.3	
Informal votes		26	0.7	
Turnout		3,822	77.5	
Liberal hold		Swing		

=== Stanley ===
1912 Queensland state election: Stanley
Party	Candidate	Votes	%	±%
Liberal	Henry Somerset	unopposed		
Liberal hold		Swing		

=== Toombul ===
1912 Queensland state election: Toombul
Party	Candidate	Votes	%	±%
Liberal	Andrew Petrie	2,648	64.7	
Labor	Daniel Dowling	1,447	35.3	
Total formal votes		4,095	99.4	
Informal votes		23	0.6	
Turnout		4,118	82.1	
Liberal hold		Swing		

=== Toowong ===
1912 Queensland state election: Toowong
Party	Candidate	Votes	%	±%
Liberal	Edward Macartney	2,734	70.5	
Labor	Lewis McDonald	1,145	29.5	
Total formal votes		3,879	99.8	
Informal votes		9	0.2	
Turnout		3,888	81.2	
Liberal hold		Swing		

=== Toowoomba ===
1912 Queensland state election: Toowoomba
Party	Candidate	Votes	%	±%
Liberal	James Tolmie	1,784	59.3	
Labor	Michael Alke	1,225	40.7	
Total formal votes		3,009	99.6	
Informal votes		13	0.4	
Turnout		3,022	72.8	
Liberal hold		Swing		

=== Townsville ===
1912 Queensland state election: Townsville
Party	Candidate	Votes	%	±%
Liberal	Robert Philp	1,908	54.3	
Labor	Alexander Austin	1,604	45.7	
Total formal votes		3,512	98.3	
Informal votes		60	1.7	
Turnout		3,572	72.7	
Liberal hold		Swing		

=== Warrego ===
1912 Queensland state election: Warrego
Party	Candidate	Votes	%	±%
Labor	Harry Coyne	1,758	65.4	
Liberal	Duncan McDonald	932	34.6	
Total formal votes		2,690	95.3	
Informal votes		134	4.7	
Turnout		2,824	69.7	
Labor hold		Swing		

=== Warwick ===
1912 Queensland state election: Warwick
Party	Candidate	Votes	%	±%
Liberal	George Barnes	1,915	59.4	
Labor	Angus Sinclair	1,307	40.6	
Total formal votes		3,222	98.8	
Informal votes		38	1.2	
Turnout		3,260	70.3	
Liberal hold		Swing		

=== Wide Bay ===
1912 Queensland state election: Wide Bay
Party	Candidate	Votes	%	±%
Liberal	Charles Booker	1,866	57.1	
Labor	Andrew Thompson	1,400	42.9	
Total formal votes		3,266	99.2	
Informal votes		27	0.8	
Turnout		3,293	81.2	
Liberal hold		Swing		

=== Windsor ===
1912 Queensland state election: Windsor
Party	Candidate	Votes	%	±%
Liberal	Hugh Macrossan	2,488	57.1	
Labor	Walter Crampton	1,837	42.9	
Total formal votes		4,285	99.3	
Informal votes		32	0.7	
Turnout		4,317	85.0	
Liberal hold		Swing		

== See also ==
- 1912 Queensland state election
- Candidates of the Queensland state election, 1912
- Members of the Queensland Legislative Assembly, 1912-1915
