= Candidates of the 1912 Queensland state election =

The 1912 state election in Queensland, Australia was held on 27 April 1912.

The main parties in the election were the Liberal Party, led by Premier Digby Denham and the Labor Party, led by Leader of the Opposition David Bowman.

The election was the first conducted under the Electoral Districts Act 1910 which allowed for 72 single-member electorates based on the principle of one vote, one value.

== Retiring Members ==
=== Labor ===
- Vincent Lesina (Clermont)
- Thomas Nevitt (Carpentaria)

=== Liberal ===
- William Thorn (Aubigny)

== Candidates ==
Sitting members at the time of the election are shown in bold text.

Electorate	Held by	Labor candidate	Liberal candidate	Other candidate(s)
Albert	Liberal		**John Appel**	
Aubigny	Liberal	John Connelly	Alfred Luke	
Balonne	Labor	**Edward Land**	Jasper Harvey	
Barcoo	Labor	**T. J. Ryan**	Albert Carchlove	
Bowen	Labor	**Myles Ferricks**	Edwin Caine	
Bremer	Liberal	William Hefferan	**James Cribb**	
Brisbane	Liberal	Mick Kirwan	**Edward Forrest**	
Bulimba	Liberal	Hugh McMinn	**Walter Barnes**	
Bundaberg	Labor	**George Barber**	James MacLeod	
Buranda	Liberal	John Huxham	William Stephens	
Burke	Independent	**Charles Collins**		**William Murphy** (Ind)
Burnett	Liberal	Alfred Jones	Bernard Corser	
Burrum	Liberal	Albert Whitford	**Colin Rankin**	
Cairns	Independent	William McCormack		**John Mann** (Ind)
Carnarvon	Liberal	Tom Crawford	**Donald Gunn**	
Charters Towers	Labor	**John Mullan**	Robert Williams	
Chillagoe	Labor	**Ted Theodore**	Archibald Frew	
Cook	Liberal	Harry Ryan	**Henry Douglas**	
Cooroora	Liberal	William Jones	**Harry Walker**	
Cunningham	Liberal	Percy McCawley	**Francis Grayson**	
Dalby	Liberal	Robert Turnbull	**William Vowles**	
Drayton	Liberal	James Desmond	William Bebbington	William Binns (Ind)
Eacham	Labor	William Gillies	Michael Woods	
East Toowoomba	Liberal	George Walden	**Robert Roberts**	
Enoggera	Liberal	William Lloyd	**Richard Trout**	
Fassifern	Liberal		**Arnold Wienholt**	
Fitzroy	Liberal	Charles Bluett	**Kenneth Grant**	
Flinders	Labor	**John May**		
Fortitude Valley	Labor	**David Bowman**	Edwin Fowles	
Gregory	Labor	**William Hamilton**	Francis North	
Gympie	Labor	**George Ryland**	George Mackay	**Daniel Mulcahy** (Ind Lab)
Herbert	Labor	**William Lennon**	Frederick O'Rourke	
Ipswich	Liberal	**William Ryott Maughan**	**James Blair**	
Ithaca	Liberal	John Gilday	Arthur Hawthorn	
Kennedy	Labor	**James O'Sullivan**	Osborn Fenwick	
Keppel	Liberal	James Larcombe	**James Brennan**	Frank Lennon (Ind Lib)
Kurilpa	Liberal	James Sharpe	**James Allan**	
Leichhardt	Labor	**Herbert Hardacre**	William Fox	
Lockyer	Liberal		**William Armstrong**	
Logan	Liberal	Wolfgang Arnold	**James Stodart**	
Mackay	Liberal	Charles Tait	**Walter Paget**	
Maranoa	Labor	**John Hunter**	Aaron Hoskin	
Maree	Liberal	William Bertram	**David Hunter**	
Maryborough	Liberal	William Mitchell	**Edward Corser**	
Merthyr	Liberal	**Peter McLachlan**	**Thomas Welsby**	
Mirani	Liberal	Philip Kirwan	**Edward Swayne**	
Mitchell	Labor	**John Payne**	John Cross	
Mount Morgan	Independent	James Stopford	**James Crawford**	
Mundingburra	Labor	**Thomas Foley**	William Little	
Murilla	Liberal	**Frank Allen**	**Godfrey Morgan**	
Murrumba	Liberal	Gideon Dennis	**James Forsyth**	
Musgrave	Liberal	Henry Cattermull	**John White**	
Nanango	Liberal	Maurice Harland	**Robert Hodge**	
Normanby	Liberal	George Martens	**George Fox**	
Nundah	Liberal	Robert McCormack	**Thomas Bridges**	
Oxley	Liberal	Charles Martin	**Digby Denham**	
Paddington	Liberal	John Fihelly	John Walsh	
Pittsworth	Liberal	Matthias Dwyer	**Donald Mackintosh**	
Port Curtis	Labor	**Edward Breslin**	John Kessell	
Queenton	Labor	**Vern Winstanley**	Frederick Johnson	
Rockhampton	Labor	**John Adamson**	George Curtis	
Rosewood	Liberal	Patrick Madden	**Harry Stevens**	John Rea (Ind); William Ruhno (Ind)
South Brisbane	Liberal	Joseph Sherry	**Thomas Bouchard**	
Stanley	Liberal		**Henry Somerset**	
Toombul	Liberal	Daniel Dowling	**Andrew Petrie**	
Toowong	Liberal	Lewis McDonald	**Edward Macartney**	
Toowoomba	Liberal	Michael Alke	**James Tolmie**	
Townsville	Liberal	Alexander Austin	**Robert Philp**	
Warrego	Labor	**Harry Coyne**	Duncan McDonald	
Warwick	Liberal	Angus Sinclair	**George Barnes**	
Wide Bay	Liberal	Andrew Thompson	**Charles Booker**	
Windsor	Liberal	Walter Crampton	Hugh Macrossan	

== See also ==
- 1912 Queensland state election
- Members of the Queensland Legislative Assembly, 1909–1912
- Members of the Queensland Legislative Assembly, 1912–1915
- List of political parties in Australia
