= Electoral results for the district of Carnarvon =

Queensland, Australia, district election results

This is a list of electoral results for the electoral district of Carnarvon in Queensland state elections:

== Members for the district of Carnarvon ==
Member	Party	Term
Ratcliffe Pring		1873–1874
William Miles		1874–1875
John Tyrel		1876–1883
Justin Foxton	Conservative	1883–1890
Justin Foxton	Ministerial	1890–1903
Justin Foxton	Conservative	1903–1904
Adolphus Barton	Liberal	1904–1907
Adolphus Barton	Kidstonites	1907
Donald Gunn	Independent	1907–1909
Donald Gunn	Liberal	1909–1917
Donald Gunn	National	1917–1920
Edward Costello	Country	1920–1925
Edward Costello	CPNP	1925–1935
Paul Hilton	Labor	1935–1957
Paul Hilton	QLP	1957–1963
Henry McKechnie	Country	1963–1974
Peter McKechnie	National	1974–1989
Lawrence Springborg	National	1989–1992

== Election results ==
=== Elections in the 1980s ===
1989 Queensland state election: Carnarvon
Party	Candidate	Votes	%	±%
National	Lawrence Springborg	4,712	41.3	−25.8
Labor	Maurice Passmore	3,676	32.3	−0.6
Liberal	Ruth Buchanan	1,481	13.0	+13.0
Independent	Jim Smith	836	7.3	+7.3
Independent	Graham Caslick	692	6.1	+6.1
Total formal votes		11,397	96.0	−1.3
Informal votes		472	4.0	+1.3
Turnout		11,869	91.9	−0.1
Two-party-preferred result
National	Lawrence Springborg	6,710	58.9	−8.2
Labor	Maurice Passmore	4,687	41.1	+8.2
National hold		Swing	−8.2	

1986 Queensland state election: Carnarvon
Party	Candidate	Votes	%	±%
National	Peter McKechnie	7,210	67.1	+2.4
Labor	Paul Lucas	3,529	32.9	−2.4
Total formal votes		10,739	97.3	
Informal votes		297	2.7	
Turnout		11,036	92.0	
National hold		Swing	+2.4	

1983 Queensland state election: Carnarvon
Party	Candidate	Votes	%	±%
National	Peter McKechnie	6,363	64.3	+2.5
Labor	Deanna Selle	3,537	35.7	−2.5
Total formal votes		9,900	98.4	−0.3
Informal votes		163	1.6	+0.3
Turnout		10,063	92.6	+1.3
National hold		Swing	+2.5	

1980 Queensland state election: Carnarvon
Party	Candidate	Votes	%	±%
National	Peter McKechnie	5,921	61.8	−1.7
Labor	Johannes De Roo	3,659	38.2	+1.7
Total formal votes		9,580	98.7	+0.7
Informal votes		126	1.3	−0.7
Turnout		9,706	91.3	−1.4
National hold		Swing	−1.7	

=== Elections in the 1970s ===
1977 Queensland state election: Carnarvon
Party	Candidate	Votes	%	±%
National	Peter McKechnie	5,875	63.5	+13.4
Labor	Colin Batterham	3,383	36.5	+11.5
Total formal votes		9,258	98.0	
Informal votes		184	2.0	
Turnout		9,442	92.7	
National hold		Swing	−8.1	

1974 Queensland state election: Carnarvon
Party	Candidate	Votes	%	±%
National	Peter McKechnie	4,496	50.1	+0.9
Labor	John Saunders	2,244	25.0	−18.0
Liberal	Fred Rogers	1,812	20.2	+20.2
Queensland Labor	Raymond Macnamara	430	4.8	−2.9
Total formal votes		8,982	98.2	−0.5
Informal votes		166	1.8	+0.5
Turnout		9,148	91.7	−1.4
Two-party-preferred result
National	Peter McKechnie	6,432	71.6	+15.7
Labor	John Saunders	2,550	28.4	−15.7
National hold		Swing	+15.7	

1972 Queensland state election: Carnarvon
Party	Candidate	Votes	%	±%
Country	Henry McKechnie	4,180	49.2	−7.2
Labor	Neil Sullivan	3,652	43.0	+10.5
Queensland Labor	Raymond Macnamara	655	7.7	−3.3
Total formal votes		8,487	98.7	
Informal votes		107	1.3	
Turnout		8,594	93.1	
Two-party-preferred result
Country	Henry McKechnie	4,745	55.9	−8.5
Labor	Neil Sullivan	3,742	44.1	+8.5
Country hold		Swing	−8.5	

=== Elections in the 1960s ===
1969 Queensland state election: Carnarvon
Party	Candidate	Votes	%	±%
Country	Henry McKechnie	4,791	56.4	−0.4
Labor	Arthur Johnson	2,762	32.5	+4.2
Queensland Labor	Frederick Burges	937	11.0	−3.8
Total formal votes		8,490	98.6	+0.2
Informal votes		123	1.4	−0.2
Turnout		8,613	92.7	−0.8
Two-party-preferred result
Country	Henry McKechnie	5,471	64.4	−3.2
Labor	Arthur Johnson	3,019	35.6	+3.2
Country hold		Swing	−3.2	

1966 Queensland state election: Carnarvon
Party	Candidate	Votes	%	±%
Country	Henry McKechnie	4,922	56.8	+20.4
Labor	Douglas Gow	2,455	28.3	+0.1
Queensland Labor	Frederick Burges	1,286	14.8	−20.6
Total formal votes		8,663	98.4	+0.2
Informal votes		144	1.6	−0.2
Turnout		8,807	93.5	−0.8
Two-party-preferred result
Country	Henry McKechnie	5,856	67.6	+13.7
Labor	Douglas Gow	2,807	32.4	+32.4
Country hold		Swing	+13.7	

1963 Queensland state election: Carnarvon
Party	Candidate	Votes	%	±%
Country	Henry McKechnie	3,157	36.4	+0.3
Queensland Labor	Paul Hilton	3,073	35.4	−5.9
Labor	Douglas Gow	2,449	28.2	+5.5
Total formal votes		8,679	98.2	−0.6
Informal votes		156	1.8	+0.6
Turnout		8,835	94.3	+2.6
Two-party-preferred result
Country	Henry McKechnie	4,950	57.0	
Labor	Douglas Gow	3,729	43.0	
Two-candidate-preferred result
Country	Henry McKechnie	4,681	53.9	
Queensland Labor	Paul Hilton	3,998	46.1	
Country gain from Queensland Labor		Swing	N/A	

1960 Queensland state election: Carnarvon
Party	Candidate	Votes	%	±%
Queensland Labor	Paul Hilton	3,611	41.3	
Country	Fred Rogers	3,155	36.1	
Labor	Douglas Gow	1,983	22.7	
Total formal votes		8,749	98.8	
Informal votes		102	1.2	
Turnout		8,851	91.7	
Queensland Labor hold		Swing		

=== Elections in the 1950s ===
1957 Queensland state election: Carnarvon
Party	Candidate	Votes	%	±%
Queensland Labor	Paul Hilton	4,517	46.2	+46.2
Country	Fred Rogers	3,911	40.0	−1.8
Labor	Douglas Gow	1,343	13.7	−44.5
Total formal votes		9,771	99.2	−0.1
Informal votes		77	0.8	+0.1
Turnout		9,848	93.9	+1.9
Queensland Labor gain from Labor		Swing	N/A	

1956 Queensland state election: Carnarvon
Party	Candidate	Votes	%	±%
Labor	Paul Hilton	5,416	58.2	−3.2
Country	Fred Rogers	3,896	41.8	+3.2
Total formal votes		9,312	99.3	+0.5
Informal votes		67	0.7	−0.5
Turnout		9,379	92.0	−0.1
Labor hold		Swing	−3.2	

1953 Queensland state election: Carnarvon
Party	Candidate	Votes	%	±%
Labor	Paul Hilton	5,625	61.4	+10.6
Country	Eric McCorkell	3,537	38.6	−10.6
Total formal votes		9,162	98.8	−0.5
Informal votes		108	1.2	+0.5
Turnout		9,270	92.1	+1.9
Labor hold		Swing	+10.6	

1950 Queensland state election: Carnarvon
Party	Candidate	Votes	%	±%
Labor	Paul Hilton	4,500	50.8	
Country	Sandy Cameron	4,354	49.2	
Total formal votes		8,834	99.3	
Informal votes		85	0.7	
Turnout		8,919	90.2	
Labor hold		Swing		

=== Elections in the 1940s ===
1947 Queensland state election: Carnarvon
Party	Candidate	Votes	%	±%
Labor	Paul Hilton	4,380	52.7	−3.9
Country	Harold Phillips	3,930	47.3	+3.9
Total formal votes		8,310	99.1	+4.0
Informal votes		77	0.9	−4.0
Turnout		8,387	87.8	−0.3
Labor hold		Swing	−3.9	

1944 Queensland state election: Carnarvon
Party	Candidate	Votes	%	±%
Labor	Paul Hilton	4,211	56.6	−43.4
Country	Harold Phillips	3,235	43.4	+43.4
Total formal votes		7,446	95.1	
Informal votes		386	4.9	
Turnout		7,832	88.1	
Labor hold		Swing	N/A	

1941 Queensland state election: Carnarvon
Party	Candidate	Votes	%	±%
Labor	Paul Hilton	unopposed		
Labor hold		Swing		

=== Elections in the 1930s ===
1938 Queensland state election: Carnarvon
Party	Candidate	Votes	%	±%
Labor	Paul Hilton	4,514	56.2	+3.4
Country	John Leahy	3,515	43.8	+4.3
Total formal votes		8,029	99.3	+0.1
Informal votes		55	0.7	−0.1
Turnout		8,084	91.6	−0.3
Labor hold		Swing	N/A	

1935 Queensland state election: Cairns
Party	Candidate	Votes	%	±%
Labor	Paul Hilton	4,157	52.8	+8.6
Country	Edward Costello	3,110	39.5	−7.3
Douglas Credit	Ernest E Hall	605	7.7	
Total formal votes		7,872	98.4	
Informal votes		126	1.6	
Turnout		7,998	92.6	
Labor gain from Country		Swing	N/A	

1932 Queensland state election: Carnarvon
Party	Candidate	Votes	%	±%
CPNP	Edward Costello	3,214	46.8	
Labor	Paul Hilton	3,032	44.2	
Independent	James Ferris	621	9.0	
Total formal votes		6,867	99.2	
Informal votes		54	0.8	
Turnout		6,921	93.8	
Two-party-preferred result
CPNP	Edward Costello	3,547	52.7	
Labor	Paul Hilton	3,186	47.3	
CPNP hold		Swing		

=== Elections in the 1920s ===
1929 Queensland state election: Carnarvon
Party	Candidate	Votes	%	±%
CPNP	Edward Costello	3,693	60.7	+6.8
Labor	Adolphus Baker	2,390	39.3	−6.8
Total formal votes		6,083	99.0	−0.1
Informal votes		59	1.0	+0.1
Turnout		6,142	89.3	+1.3
CPNP hold		Swing	+6.8	

1926 Queensland state election: Carnarvon
Party	Candidate	Votes	%	±%
CPNP	Edward Costello	3,054	53.9	+0.7
Labor	Adolphus Baker	2,607	46.1	−0.7
Total formal votes		5,661	99.1	−0.5
Informal votes		54	0.9	+0.5
Turnout		5,715	88.0	+7.0
CPNP hold		Swing	+0.7	

1923 Queensland state election: Carnarvon
Party	Candidate	Votes	%	±%
Country	Edward Costello	3,099	53.2	−1.0
Labor	Thomas Brown	2,721	46.8	+1.0
Total formal votes		5,820	99.6	−0.2
Informal votes		25	0.4	+0.2
Turnout		5,845	81.0	−1.5
Country hold		Swing	−1.0	

1920 Queensland state election: Carnarvon
Party	Candidate	Votes	%	±%
Country	Edward Costello	2,935	54.2	+54.2
Labor	Alfred Jones	2,484	45.8	−2.0
Total formal votes		5,419	99.8	+0.3
Informal votes		13	0.2	−0.3
Turnout		5,432	82.5	−0.8
Country gain from National		Swing	N/A	

=== Elections in the 1910s ===
1918 Queensland state election: Carnarvon
Party	Candidate	Votes	%	±%
National	Donald Gunn	2,186	52.2	+1.2
Labor	Randolph Bedford	1,998	47.8	−1.2
Total formal votes		4,184	99.5	+0.9
Informal votes		20	0.5	−0.9
Turnout		4,204	83.3	−4.3
National hold		Swing	+1.2	

1915 Queensland state election: Carnarvon
Party	Candidate	Votes	%	±%
Liberal	Donald Gunn	1,790	51.0	−4.6
Labor	George Boyden	1,722	49.0	+4.6
Total formal votes		3,512	98.6	−0.8
Informal votes		48	1.4	+0.8
Turnout		3,560	87.6	+9.7
Liberal hold		Swing	−4.6	

1912 Queensland state election: Carnarvon
Party	Candidate	Votes	%	±%
Liberal	Donald Gunn	1,793	55.6	
Labor	Tom Crawford	1,430	44.4	
Total formal votes		3,223	99.4	
Informal votes		18	0.6	
Turnout		3,241	77.9	
Liberal hold		Swing		
