= Electoral results for the district of Herbert =

Queensland, Australia, district election results

This is a list of electoral results for the electoral district of Herbert in Queensland state elections.

== Members for Herbert ==
The following people were elected in the seat of Herbert:

Member	Party	Term
Alfred Cowley	Ministerial	12 May 1888 – 18 May 1907
William Lennon	Labor	18 May 1907 – 16 Jan 1920
Percy Pease	Labor	10 Apr 1920 – 17 Sep 1940
Stephen Theodore	Labor	9 Nov 1940 – 29 Apr 1950

== Election results ==
=== Elections in the 1940s ===
1947 Queensland state election: Herbert
Party	Candidate	Votes	%	±%
Labor	Stephen Theodore	4,308	48.0	−9.1
Country	Carlisle Wordsworth	2,728	30.4	+30.4
Communist	Les Sullivan	1,936	21.6	−21.3
Total formal votes		8,972	98.8	+1.9
Informal votes		112	1.2	−1.9
Turnout		9,084	88.6	+2.6
Labor hold		Swing	N/A	

1944 Queensland state election: Herbert
Party	Candidate	Votes	%	±%
Labor	Stephen Theodore	4,331	57.1	+0.9
Communist	Les Sullivan	3,261	42.9	+42.9
Total formal votes		7,592	96.9	−1.3
Informal votes		166	1.8	+1.3
Turnout		7,834	86.0	−5.7
Labor hold		Swing	N/A	

1941 Queensland state election: Herbert
Party	Candidate	Votes	%	±%
Labor	Stephen Theodore	5,182	56.2	+3.3
Country	Alfred Moule	2,417	26.2	+8.3
Independent Socialist	Jack Wells	1,617	17.5	+0.5
Total formal votes		9,216	98.2	−0.2
Informal votes		166	1.8	+0.2
Turnout		9,382	91.7	+4.5
Labor hold		Swing	−6.5	

- Preferences were not distributed.

1940 Herbert state by-election
Party	Candidate	Votes	%	±%
Labor	Stephen Theodore	4,839	53.8	+0.9
Country	Alfred Moule	2,472	27.5	+9.6
Independent Socialist	Jack Wells	1,683	18.7	+18.7
Total formal votes		8,994		
Informal votes				
Turnout				
Labor hold		Swing	N/A	

=== Elections in the 1930s ===
1938 Queensland state election: Herbert
Party	Candidate	Votes	%	±%
Labor	Percy Pease	4,858	52.9	−10.8
Country	Clarence Page	1,643	17.9	+17.9
Communist	Jack Henry	1,563	17.0	−0.3
Protestant Labour	Ernest Malin	1,121	12.2	+12.2
Total formal votes		9,185	98.4	+0.2
Informal votes		146	1.6	−0.2
Turnout		9,331	87.2	−0.9
Labor hold		Swing	N/A	

- Preferences were not distributed.

1935 Queensland state election: Herbert
Party	Candidate	Votes	%	±%
Labor	Percy Pease	5,590	63.7	
Independent	Roy Sherrington	1,661	18.9	
Communist	Jack Henry	1,520	17.3	
Total formal votes		8,771	98.2	
Informal votes		158	1.8	
Turnout		8,929	88.1	
Labor hold		Swing		

- Preferences were not distributed.

1932 Queensland state election: Herbert
Party	Candidate	Votes	%	±%
Labor	Percy Pease	4,573	66.5	
CPNP	Clarence Page	2,307	33.5	
Total formal votes		6,880	98.1	
Informal votes		134	1.9	
Turnout		7,014	90.3	
Labor hold		Swing		

=== Elections in the 1920s ===
1929 Queensland state election: Herbert
Party	Candidate	Votes	%	±%
Labor	Percy Pease	4,370	57.5	+0.2
CPNP	Clarence Page	3,226	42.5	−0.2
Total formal votes		7,596	97.4	−1.6
Informal votes		205	2.6	+1.6
Turnout		7,801		
Labor hold		Swing	+0.2	

1926 Queensland state election: Herbert
Party	Candidate	Votes	%	±%
Labor	Percy Pease	3,796	57.3	−9.2
CPNP	Norman Mighell	2,827	42.7	+9.2
Total formal votes		6,623	99.0	+0.1
Informal votes		69	1.0	−0.1
Turnout		6,692	84.0	+8.2
Labor hold		Swing	−9.2	

1923 Queensland state election: Herbert
Party	Candidate	Votes	%	±%
Labor	Percy Pease	3,191	66.5	+11.9
United	John McNamee	1,607	33.5	+33.5
Total formal votes		4,798	98.9	+0.8
Informal votes		54	1.1	−0.8
Turnout		4,852	75.8	−5.2
Labor hold		Swing	+11.9	

1920 Queensland state election: Herbert
Party	Candidate	Votes	%	±%
Labor	Percy Pease	2,869	54.6	−8.6
Northern Country	Hedley Gelston	2,387	45.5	+45.5
Total formal votes		5,256	98.1	−0.9
Informal votes		102	1.9	+0.9
Turnout		5,358	87.8	+0.6
Labor hold		Swing	−8.6	

1920 Herbert state by-election
Party	Candidate	Votes	%	±%
Labor	Percy Pease	2,134	50.6	−12.8
National	Hedley Gelston	2,087	49.4	+12.8
Total formal votes		4,221		
Informal votes				
Turnout				
Labor hold		Swing	−12.8	

=== Elections in the 1910s ===
1918 Queensland state election: Herbert
Party	Candidate	Votes	%	±%
Labor	William Lennon	2,304	63.4	−1.2
National	Ralph Johnson	1,333	36.6	+1.2
Total formal votes		3,637	98.1	+0.4
Informal votes		71	1.9	−0.4
Turnout		3,708	69.3	−11.4
Labor hold		Swing	−1.2	

1915 Queensland state election: Herbert
Party	Candidate	Votes	%	±%
Labor	William Lennon	1,864	64.6	+7.9
Liberal	Ralph Johnson	1,023	35.4	−7.9
Total formal votes		2,887	97.7	−1.7
Informal votes		69	2.3	+1.7
Turnout		2,956	80.7	+13.4
Labor hold		Swing	+7.9	

1912 Queensland state election: Herbert
Party	Candidate	Votes	%	±%
Labor	William Lennon	1,472	56.7	
Liberal	Frederick O'Rourke	1,124	43.3	
Total formal votes		2,596	99.4	
Informal votes		15	0.6	
Turnout		2,611	67.3	
Labor hold		Swing		
