= Members of the Queensland Legislative Assembly, 1912–1915 =

This is a list of members of the 19th Legislative Assembly of Queensland from 1912 to 1915, as elected at the 1912 state election held on 27 April 1912.

Apart from the 1904–1907 term, when Labor had held two seats short of a majority, the parliament had been dominated by non-Labor forces since the separation of Queensland from New South Wales in 1860 — this was the last such parliament until 1957, apart from the 1929–1932 term led by the Moore Ministry.

Name	Party	Electorate	Term in office
John Adamson	Labor	Rockhampton	1907–1909; 1911–1917
James Allan	Liberal	Kurilpa	1909–1915
Hon John Appel	Liberal/Farmers' Union	Albert	1908–1929
Edward Archer^{[4]}	Liberal	Normanby	1914–1915
William Drayton Armstrong	Liberal	Lockyer	1893–1904; 1907–1918
George Philip Barber	Labor	Bundaberg	1901–1935
George Powell Barnes	Liberal	Warwick	1908–1935
Hon Walter Barnes	Liberal	Bulimba	1901–1915, 1918–1933
William Bebbington	Liberal/Farmers' Union	Drayton	1912–1923
Ernest Bell^{[3]}	Liberal	Fassifern	1913–1930
William Bertram	Labor	Maree	1912–1929
Hon James Blair	Liberal	Ipswich	1902–1915
Charles Booker	Liberal	Wide Bay	1909–1918
Thomas Bouchard	Liberal	South Brisbane	1904–1908; 1909–1915
David Bowman	Labor	Fortitude Valley	1899–1902; 1904–1916
Edward Breslin^{[2]}	Labor	Port Curtis	1909–1912
Thomas Bridges	Liberal	Nundah	1896–1907; 1909–1918
Edwin Caine	Liberal	Bowen	1912–1915
Bernard Corser	Liberal	Burnett	1912–1928
Edward Corser	Liberal	Maryborough	1909–1915
Harry Coyne	Labor	Warrego	1908–1923
James Crawford	Liberal	Mount Morgan	1909–1915
James Cribb	Liberal	Bremer	1893–1896; 1899–1915
Hon Digby Denham	Liberal	Oxley	1902–1915
Henry Douglas	Liberal	Cook	1907–1915
Hon John Fihelly	Labor	Paddington	1912–1922
Thomas Foley	Labor	Mundingburra	1909–1920
James Forsythe	Liberal	Murrumba	1899–1907; 1909–1918
George Fox^{[4]}	Liberal	Normanby	1877–1878; 1901–1914
John Gilday	Labor	Ithaca	1912–1926
William Gillies	Labor	Eacham	1912–1925
Hon Kenneth Grant	Liberal	Fitzroy	1902–1915
Francis Grayson	Liberal	Cunningham	1904–1920
Donald Gunn	Liberal	Carnarvon	1907–1920
William Hamilton	Labor	Gregory	1899–1915
Herbert Hardacre	Labor	Leichhardt	1893–1919
Robert Hodge	Liberal/Farmers' Union	Nanango	1902–1904; 1909–1920
John McEwan Hunter	Labor	Maranoa	1907–1919
John Huxham	Labor	Buranda	1908–1909, 1912–1924
John Kessell^{[2]}	Liberal	Port Curtis	1912–1915
Mick Kirwan	Labor	Brisbane	1912–1932
Edward Land	Labor	Balonne	1904–1927
James Larcombe	Labor	Keppel	1912–1929, 1932–1956
William Lennon	Labor	Herbert	1907–1920
Alfred James Luke	Liberal	Aubigny	1912–1915
Hon Edward Macartney	Liberal	Toowong	1900–1908; 1909–1920
Hon William McCormack	Labor	Cairns	1912–1930
George Mackay	Liberal	Gympie	1912–1915
Donald MacKintosh	Liberal	Pittsworth	1899–1915
Hugh Macrossan	Liberal	Windsor	1912–1915
John May	Labor	Flinders	1907–1917
Godfrey Morgan	Liberal/Farmers' Union	Murilla	1909–1938
William Murphy	Independent	Burke	1904–1907; 1908–1918
James O'Sullivan	Labor	Kennedy	1909–1920
Hon Walter Paget	Liberal	Mackay	1901–1915
John Payne	Labor	Mitchell	1905–1928
Andrew Lang Petrie	Liberal	Toombul	1893–1926
Robert Philp	Liberal	Townsville	1886–1915
Hon Colin Rankin	Liberal	Burrum	1905–1918
Robert Roberts	Liberal	East Toowoomba	1907–1934
T. J. Ryan	Labor	Barcoo	1909–1919
Henry Plantagenet Somerset	Liberal	Stanley	1904–1920
Harry Stevens	Liberal	Rosewood	1911–1918
James Stodart	Liberal	Logan	1896–1918
Edward Swayne	Liberal	Mirani	1907–1935
Ted Theodore	Labor	Chillagoe	1909–1925
Hon James Tolmie	Liberal	Toowoomba	1901–1907; 1909–1918
Richard Trout	Liberal	Enoggera	1911–1915
William Vowles	Liberal	Dalby	1911–1926
Harry Walker	Liberal	Cooroora	1907–1947
Thomas Welsby	Liberal	Merthyr	1911–1915
Hon John White	Liberal	Musgrave	1903–1904; 1907–1915
Arnold Wienholt^{[3]}	Liberal	Fassifern	1909–1913, 1930–1935
Robert Williams	Liberal	Charters Towers	1912–1915
Vern Winstanley	Labor	Queenton	1908–1932

== Notes ==
^{1} At the 1912 election in Maryborough, Edward Corser, the sitting Liberal member, won against Labor candidate William Mitchell by 10 votes. The election was declared void and went to a by-election on 12 October 1912, at which Corser won again, but by just 2 votes.
^{2} At the 1912 election in Port Curtis, Edward Breslin, the sitting Labor member, won against Liberal candidate John Kessell by 2 votes. The election was declared void on 9 October 1912 and went to a by-election on 26 October, at which Kessell won by 96 votes.
^{3} On 28 March 1913, Arnold Wienholt, the Liberal member for Fassifern, resigned to contest Wide Bay at the 1913 federal election. Liberal candidate Ernest Bell won the resulting by-election on 24 April 1913.
^{4} On 27 January 1914, George Fox, the Liberal member for Normanby, died. Liberal candidate Edward Archer won the resulting by-election on 5 March 1914.
