= Robert Herbertson =

Australian politician

Member of the Queensland Legislative Assembly for Port Curtis
- In office 27 August 1904 – 2 October 1909
- Preceded by: Jason Boles
- Succeeded by: Edward Breslin

Personal details
- Born: Robert Herbertson; 4 January 1852 Hobart, Van Diemen's Land
- Died: 1 March 1940 (aged 88) Ormiston, Queensland, Australia
- Party: Ministerialist
- Other political affiliations: Opposition
- Spouse: Mary Hannah Brear (née Clunes)
- Occupation: Miner, publican

Robert Herbertson (1852–1940) was a politician in Queensland, Australia. He was a Member of the Queensland Legislative Assembly.

== Early life ==
Robert Herberston was born on 4 January 1852 in Hobart, Van Diemen's Land, the son of Andrew Herbertson and Christiana (née Stewart). His father was a horticulturalist and Superintendent of the Government Gardens, later the Royal Tasmanian Botanical Gardens, under Sir John Franklin, (a Governor of Tasmania). His mother was attendant to Lady Jane Franklin and accompanied Lady Franklin on travels to South Australia, New Zealand and Macquarie Harbour. Herbertson was educated in Hobart.

At age 17 he went to the Colony of Victoria to try his luck on the goldfields. Later he went to Melbourne, where after managing a brick and tile company, he became a public works contractor. In 1878–1879 he was one of ten expeditioners who undertook an ill-fated search for gold in New Guinea; he maintained a diary throughout the trip.

Acting upon medical advice, he came to Queensland, and for a time ran a hotel in Gladstone. He also was a mining investor and a sawmiller.

== Politics ==
Herbertson took a keen interest in local affairs and was for some years an alderman of Gladstone and served as mayor for one term. He was also a member of the Calliope Shire Council, where he was twice chairman.

Herbertson was elected to the Queensland Legislative Assembly on 27 August 1904 as the Member for Port Curtis. He held the seat until 2 October 1909, when he was defeated by Edward Breslin.

== Later life ==
Herbertson died on 1 March 1940 in Ormiston, Queensland where he had lived for many years. He was 88 years old.

Parliament of Queensland
Preceded by Jason Boles	Member for Port Curtis; 1904–1909	Succeeded by Edward Breslin
