= Albert Norton =

Australian politician (1836–1914)

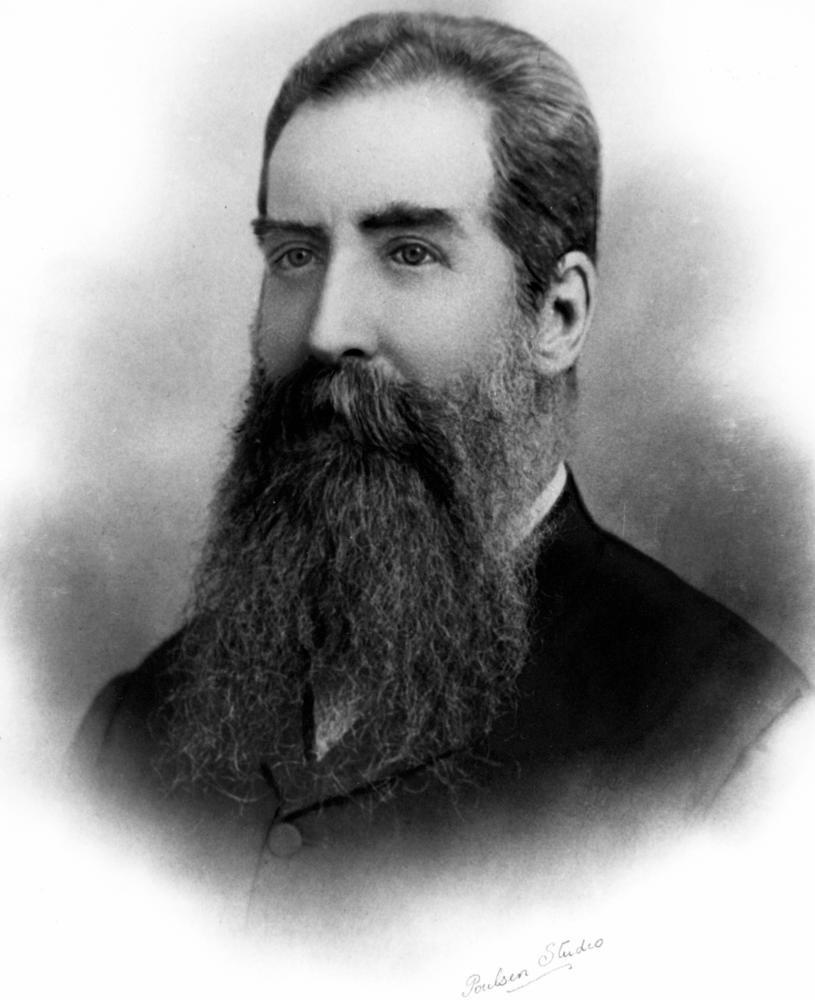

Speaker of the Queensland Legislative Assembly
- In office 25 May 1893 – 15 February 1899
- Preceded by: William Groom
- Succeeded by: Alfred Cowley
- Constituency: Port Curtis

Member of the Queensland Legislative Assembly for Port Curtis
- In office 14 November 1878 – 6 May 1893
- Preceded by: Arthur Palmer
- Succeeded by: Jason Boles

Member of the Queensland Legislative Council
- In office 11 September 1867 – 29 May 1868
- In office 23 August 1894 – 11 March 1914

Personal details
- Born: Albert Norton; 1 January 1836 Leichhardt, Sydney, New South Wales, Australia
- Died: 11 March 1914 (aged 78) Brisbane, Queensland, Australia
- Resting place: Toowong Cemetery
- Spouse(s): Mary Elizabeth Ann Walker (m. 1862 d. 1863), Harriet Maule Deacon (m. 1866 d. 1899), Amy Symes Barton (m. 1900 d. 1913)
- Occupation: Grazier

Albert Norton (1 January 1836 – 11 March 1914) was a Queensland politician, speaker of the Queensland Legislative Assembly and pastoralist.

== Later life ==
Norton died on 11 March 1914 at Milton in Brisbane.

Parliament of Queensland
Preceded by William Groom	Speaker of the Legislative Assembly; 1893 – 1899	Succeeded by Alfred Cowley
Preceded by Arthur Palmer	Member for Port Curtis; 1878–1893	Succeeded by Jason Boles
