= John Tyrel =

Australian politician

Member of the Queensland Legislative Assembly for Carnarvon
- In office 8 January 1876 – 1 October 1883
- Preceded by: William Miles
- Succeeded by: Justin Foxton

Personal details
- Born: John de Poix Tyrel; 1840 Worcester, England
- Died: 15 July 1885 (aged 44 or 45) Stanthorpe, Queensland, Australia
- Spouse: Elizabeth Ann Farley (m.1880)
- Occupation: Auctioneer

John de Poix Tyrel (1840 – 15 July 1885) was a politician in Queensland, Australia. He was a Member of the Queensland Legislative Assembly.

== Personal ==
Tyrel was born in 1840 in Worcester, England, the son of John de Poix Tyrel Snr. and Mary Christina (née Chapman). A member of the Church of England, he had a private education in London and Worcester and arrived in Queensland in 1864 and became the manager of the Redland Bay Sugar Plantation. In 1872 he was an auctioneer and commercial agent in Stanthorpe.

On 13 November 1880, Tyrel married Elizabeth, the widow of Charles Farley, on 13 November 1880, at Stanthorpe. He died there in July 1885.

== Community involvement ==
He was elected a member of the Royal Colonial Institute in 1880 and a member of the Independent Order of Oddfellows in 1883.

== Politics ==
Tyrel won the by-election in January 1876 for the electorate of Carnarvon to replace William Miles, who had resigned in October the previous year. He went on to represent Carnavon until the 1883 Queensland colonial election when he retired from politics.

Parliament of Queensland
Preceded by William Miles	Member for Carnarvon; 1876–1883	Succeeded by Justin Foxton
