= Stephen Theodore (politician) =

Australian farmer and politician

Member of the Queensland Legislative Assembly for Herbert
- In office 9 November 1940 – 29 April 1950
- Preceded by: Percy Pease
- Succeeded by: Seat abolished

Personal details
- Born: Stephen Theodore (Note: Anglified-modification of his father's surname: Teodorescu.); 1883 Port Adelaide, Province of South Australia, British Empire
- Died: 17 October 1950 (aged 66 or 67) Tully, Queensland, Australia
- Party: Labor
- Spouse: Margaret Wallace (m. 1900)
- Relations: Ted (brother)
- Children: 7
- Occupation: Farmer; Politician

Stephen Theodore (1883 – 17 October 1950) was a farmer and member of the Queensland Legislative Assembly.

== Biography ==
Theodore was born in Port Adelaide, South Australia, to parents Basil Theodore and his wife Annie (née Tanner). His brother was Ted Theodore, the former Premier of Queensland and Treasurer of Australia. Arriving in Queensland in 1915 after working the goldfields in New South Wales and Western Australia, he was a sugar grower in Tully by 1923 becoming the Director and Chairman of the Tully sugar mill. In 1950 he was a banana farmer in Tully.

In 1900 he married Margaret Wallace (died 1968), and together had four sons and three daughters. Theodore died in October 1950.

== Public career ==
Theodore, for the Labor Party represented the seat of Herbert in the Queensland Legislative Assembly from 1940 until the seat was abolished for the 1950 state election.

== Notes ==
Parliament of Queensland
Preceded by Percy Pease	Member for Herbert; 1940–1950	Abolished
