= Bill Prest =

Australian politician from Queensland (1926–2012)

Queensland Government Chief Whip
- In office 6 December 1989 – 1 October 1992
- Premier: Wayne Goss
- Preceded by: Len Stephan
- Succeeded by: Warren Pitt

Leader of Opposition Business in the House
- In office 29 August 1984 – 6 December 1989
- Leader: Nev Warburton; Wayne Goss
- Preceded by: Brian Davis
- Succeeded by: Kev Lingard
- In office 5 March 1981 – 20 October 1982
- Leader: Ed Casey
- Preceded by: Keith Wright
- Succeeded by: Brian Davis

Member of the Queensland Legislative Assembly for Port Curtis
- In office 29 May 1976 – 19 September 1992
- Preceded by: Martin Hanson
- Succeeded by: Seat abolished

Personal details
- Born: William George Prest; 2 April 1926 Longreach, Queensland, Australia
- Died: 8 December 2012 (aged 86) Gladstone, Queensland, Australia
- Party: Labor
- Spouse: Patricia Rabbitt
- Occupation: Shearer, Gladstone City Council employee

William George Prest (2 April 1926 – 8 December 2012) was a member of the Queensland Legislative Assembly for the Labor Party from 1976 until 1992, former Gladstone Harbour Board member and once Gladstone City Council mayor.

== Early life ==
Prest was born in Longreach, Queensland. In 1970, he stood for local council elections and was elected, he later became Gladstone's deputy mayor in 1975.

== Political career ==
After being elected he served as Shadow Minister Tourism, Marine Services and Fisheries until December 1977, then Shadow Minister for Main Roads, Shadow Minister for Local Government and Valuation and Shadow Minister for Transport.

In his last term in the Queensland Parliament, Prest caused controversy when he made a racist slur against former state National Party Aboriginal Affairs Minister and future Federal MP Bob Katter when he called him a gin jockey. Prest however was not publicly disciplined and retained his position as whip but the controversy did see him being taken about out of the limelight of public life.

The Gladstone Port Access Bridge was renamed the Bill Prest Bridge in 2010.

== Personal life ==
Prest died, aged 86, in Gladstone, Queensland. Robert Schwarten, Liz Cunningham, deputy mayor Matt Burnett and mayor Gail Sellers attended his funeral to pay tribute.

Prest was survived by his wife Patricia, son Darryl Prest and daughters Patricia Hick and Liz Fallon.

Parliament of Queensland
Preceded by Martin Hanson	Member for Port Curtis; 1976–1992	Abolished
