= Jim Burrows (politician) =

Australian politician

Member of the Queensland Legislative Assembly for Port Curtis
- In office 3 May 1947 – 1 Jun 1963
- Preceded by: Tommy Williams
- Succeeded by: Martin Hanson

Personal details
- Born: James Burrows; 12 February 1899 Eidsvold, Queensland, Australia
- Died: 30 October 1978 (aged 79) Gladstone, Queensland, Australia
- Party: Labor
- Spouse: Bertha Maud Wilkinson (m.1940)
- Occupation: Auditor

James Burrows (21 December 1886 - 17 August 1970) was a member of the Queensland Legislative Assembly.

== Biography ==
Burrows was born at Eidsvold, Queensland, the son of Henry Burrows and his wife Laura Christine (née Brandis). He was educated at Gaeta, Mount Perry and Many Peaks state schools and then did an accountancy and Local Government Clerkship correspondence course with Hemingway Robertson Ltd. He did general bushwork before becoming and auditor and registered valuer.

In October 1940 Burrows married Bertha Maud Wilkinson and together had four sons. He died at Gladstone in October 1978.

== Public life ==
Burrows, representing the Labor Party, won the seat of Port Curtis at the 1947 Queensland state election. He held it for the next sixteen years before retiring at the 1963 Queensland state election.

Parliament of Queensland
Preceded by Tommy Williams	Member for Port Curtis; 1947–1963	Succeeded by Martin Hanson
