= Martin Hanson =

Australian politician

Member of the Queensland Legislative Assembly for Port Curtis
- In office 1 June 1963 – 19 February 1976
- Preceded by: James Burrows
- Succeeded by: Bill Prest

Personal details
- Born: Martin Hanson; 2 July 1923 Charters Towers, Queensland, Australia
- Died: 20 February 1976 (aged 52) South Brisbane, Queensland, Australia
- Party: Labor
- Spouse: Mary Elizabeth Hanlon
- Education: University of Queensland
- Occupation: Hotel owner

Martin 'Marty' Hanson (2 July 1923 – 20 February 1976) was an Australian politician. He was the Labor member for Port Curtis in the Legislative Assembly of Queensland from 1963 to 1976.

Parliament of Queensland
Preceded by James Burrows	Member for Port Curtis; 1963–1976	Succeeded by Bill Prest
