= George Carter (Queensland politician) =

Australian politician

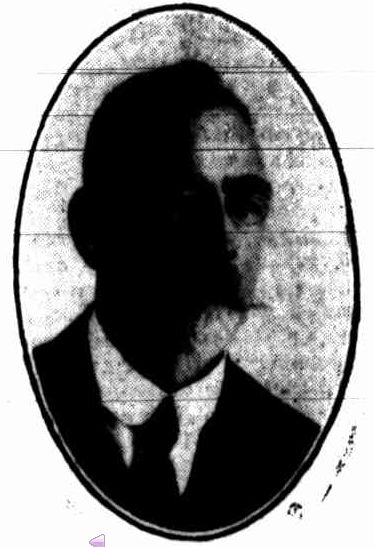
- George Carter, 1926

Member of the Queensland Legislative Assembly for Port Curtis
- In office 22 May 1915 – 9 October 1920
- Preceded by: John Kessell
- Succeeded by: John Fletcher
- In office 12 May 1923 – 11 May 1929
- Preceded by: John Fletcher
- Succeeded by: Frank Butler

Personal details
- Born: George Carter; 1864 Nelson, New Zealand
- Died: 5 October 1932 (aged 67–68) Brisbane, Queensland, Australia
- Resting place: Toowong Cemetery
- Party: Labor
- Spouse: Alexandria Delia Kate Comerford
- Occupation: Shearer, AWU organiser, Drover

George Carter (1864–1932) was a politician in Queensland, Australia. He was a Member of the Queensland Legislative Assembly.

== Early life ==
George Carter was born in 1864 in Nelson, New Zealand, the son of Samuel Carter and Louisa née Lindsay. He attended Nelson State School.

On 17 September 1907 he married Alexandria Delia Kate Comerford in Brisbane.

== Politics ==
Carter stood as a candidate of the Labor in the electoral district of Brisbane North in the 1907 state election, but was unsuccessful.

At the 1915 election, Carter was elected to the Queensland Legislative Assembly in the electoral district of Port Curtis, defeating the sitting Ministerialist member John Kessel. He won it despite claims that the local newspaper, the Gladstone Observer misrepresented his campaign speech and refused to publish a letter from him providing correct information. Carter held the seat in the 1918 election but lost the seat in the 1920 election on 9 October to the Country Party candidate John Fletcher.

However, he contested the seat again in the 1923 election and was returned on 12 May 1923, having defeated John Fletcher. He retained the seat in the 1926 election but lost it at the 1929 election to Frank Butler of the Country and Progressive National Party.

== Later life ==
Carter died at his residence in Bardon, Brisbane on 5 October 1932. He had been in failing health for the previous few years. He was buried in the Toowong Cemetery the following day.

Parliament of Queensland
Preceded by John Kessell	Member for Port Curtis; 1915–1920	Succeeded by John Fletcher
Preceded by John Fletcher	Member for Port Curtis; 1923–1929	Succeeded by Frank Butler
