= Percy Pease =

Australian politician

The Honourable Percy Pease
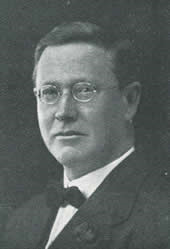

Member of the Queensland Legislative Assembly for Herbert
- In office 10 April 1920 – 17 September 1940
- Preceded by: William Lennon
- Succeeded by: Stephen Theodore

Personal details
- Born: Percy Pease; 29 July 1876 Kirkby Lonsdale, Westmorland, England
- Died: 17 September 1940 (aged 64) Cairns, Queensland, Australia
- Resting place: Martyn Street Cemetery
- Party: Labor
- Spouse: Agnes Ellen O'Brien (m.1898 d.1948)
- Occupation: Businessman

Percy Pease (29 July 1876 – 17 September 1940) was a businessman and member of the Queensland Legislative Assembly.

== Biography ==
Pease was born in Kirkby Lonsdale, Westmorland, England, to parents Cuthbert Pease, an army sergeant, and his wife Sarah Emily (née Nice). His family arrived in Brisbane in 1886 and then moved to Townsville where he attended the Townsville West State School. He found employment with Burns Philp and Samuel Allen & Sons in Townsville before working for Chillagoe Pty Co. as a forwarding manager in Mareeba. He then worked for the auctioneering and mercantile firm John Cairns & Co. where he presided over Chillagoe's first sale of township lots in November 1900.

Moving to Cairns, he held a partnership in a Cairns grocery and managed the Cairns Morning Post. Around 1904, he joined his elder brother Joseph in the carrying firm (F.A.) Wright, Heaton & Co., with Joseph looking after the Townsville operations and Percy those in Cairns. The brothers then started a general merchandise business in 1908.

On 22 January 1898 he married Agnes Ellen O'Brien (died 1948) and together had one son and four daughters. Pease died of cancer at the Cairns Hospital in September 1940. He was accorded a state funeral, the first ever held outside Brisbane. His funeral proceeded from St Monica's Catholic church to the Martyn Street Cemetery.

== Public career ==
Pease was an alderman on the Cairns City Council in 1916 before winning the 1920 by-election for the seat of Herbert in the Queensland Legislative Assembly following the resignation of William Lennon to become the Lieutenant-Governor. He held the seat for the next 20 years, dying in office in 1940.

A representative of the Labor Party all of his political life, Pease was Deputy Leader of the Opposition from 1929 until 1932 and once Labor regained office, Deputy Premier and Secretary for Public Lands from 1932 until his death. He is commemorated by a tablet set in rockface on the highest point of Kirrama Range Road. There is also a memorial stone at Pease Park, Innisfail.

Parliament of Queensland
Preceded by William Lennon	Member for Herbert; 1920–1940	Succeeded by Stephen Theodore
