= Justin Foxton =

Australian politician (1849–1916)

The Honourable Justin Foxton CMG
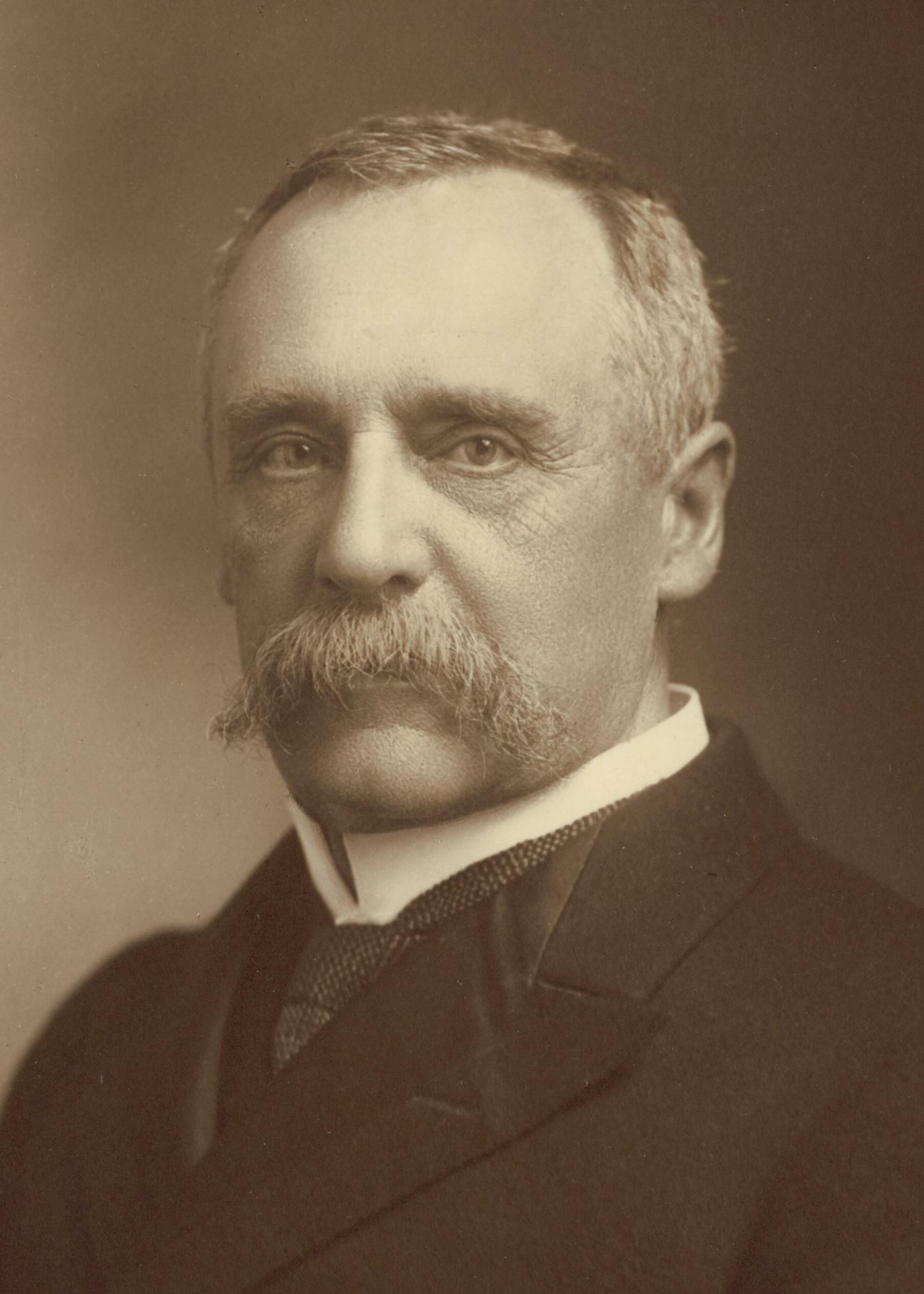

Member of the Australian Parliament for Brisbane
- In office 12 December 1906 – 13 April 1910
- Preceded by: Millice Culpin
- Succeeded by: William Finlayson

Member of the Queensland Legislative Assembly for Carnarvon
- In office 1 October 1883 – 27 August 1904
- Preceded by: John Tyrel
- Succeeded by: Adolphus Barton

Personal details
- Born: 24 September 1849 Melbourne, Victoria
- Died: 23 June 1916 (aged 66) Brisbane, Queensland
- Resting place: Toowong Cemetery
- Party: Anti-Socialist (1906–09); Liberal (1909–10)
- Spouse: Emily Mary Panton
- Occupation: Solicitor

Justin Fox Greenlaw Foxton (24 September 1849 – 23 June 1916) was an Australian barrister and politician. He served in the Legislative Assembly of Queensland from 1883 to 1904 and held ministerial office in several liberal governments. He later represented the seat of Brisbane in federal parliament (1906–1910) and was a minister without portfolio under Alfred Deakin. He was a long-serving member of Queensland's colonial militia and gained the rank of colonel.

== Early life ==
Foxton was born in Melbourne on 24 September 1849. He was the son of Isabel Elizabeth (née Potts) and John Greenlaw Foxton. His father was a sea captain who arrived in the Port Phillip District in 1841.

Foxton was educated at Melbourne Grammar School from 1859 to 1862. He moved to Queensland in 1864 and briefly worked as a jackeroo, then read law with John Malbon Thompson in Ipswich. He was called to the Queensland Bar in 1871 and the following year established a practice at the Stanthorpe tinfields. In 1878 he formed a partnership with Thompson in Brisbane.

== Politics ==
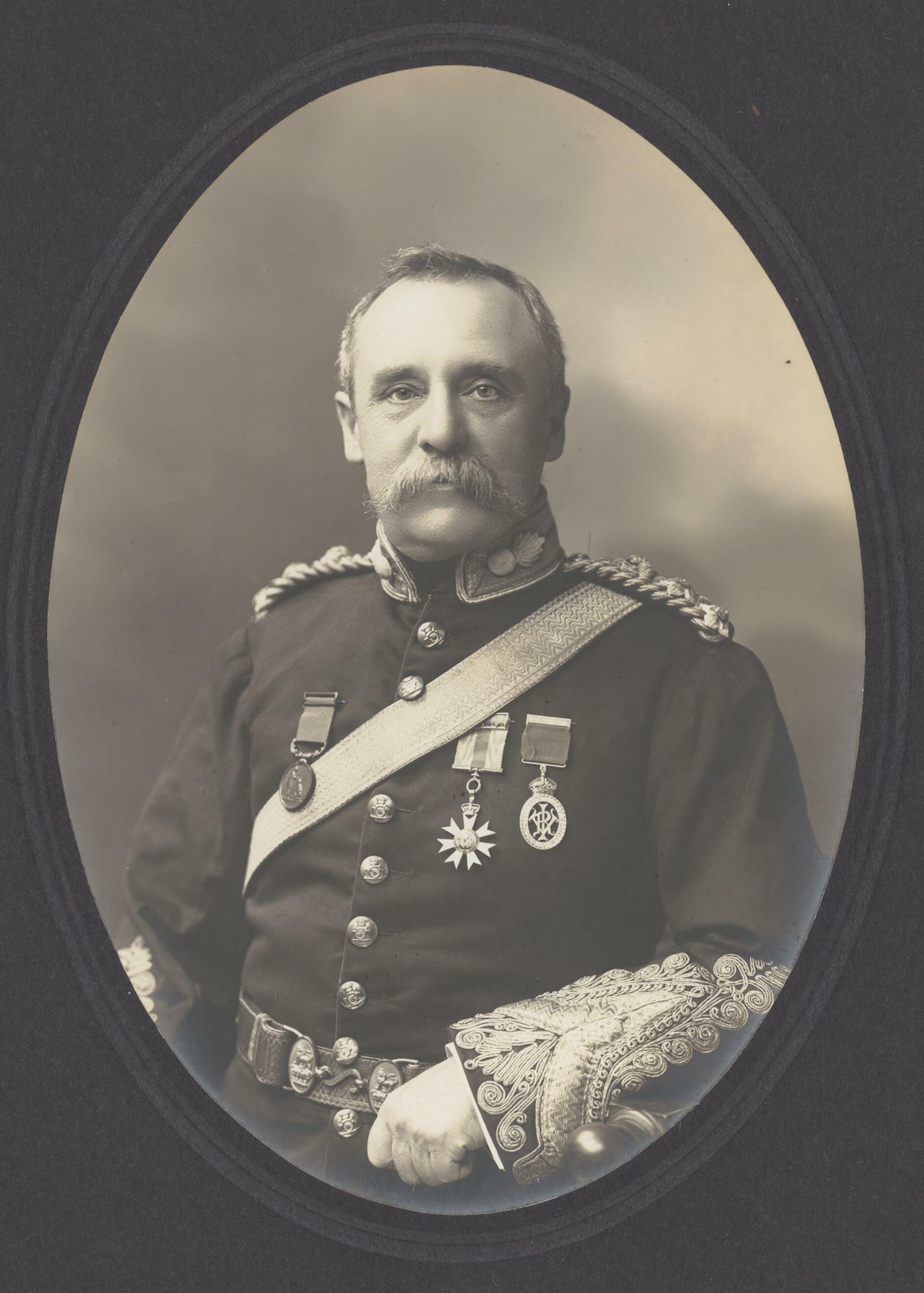
Foxton in military uniform

Foxton held the Legislative Assembly seat of Carnarvon from 1883 until 1904.

Foxton worked as an aide-de-camp to the Governor General of Australia. He also implemented the 1901 Aboriginals Protection and Restriction of the Sale of Opium Act. This Act, the first effective such measure in Queensland, implemented a system of policed missions and reserves and stopped some female exploitation.

== Personal life ==
Foxton married Emily Panton in 1874.

Foxton died at Brisbane of cerebro-vascular disease on 23 June 1916. His funeral proceeded from his former residence, Bulimba House to the Toowong Cemetery in Brisbane.

Parliament of Australia
Preceded by Millice Culpin	Member for Brisbane; 1906–1910	Succeeded by William Finlayson
Parliament of Queensland
Preceded by John Tyrel	Member for Carnarvon; 1883–1904	Succeeded by Adolphus Barton
