= Adolphus Barton =

Australian politician

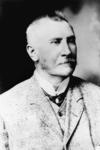

Member of the Queensland Legislative Assembly for Carnarvon
- In office 27 August 1904 – 18 May 1907
- Preceded by: Justin Foxton
- Succeeded by: Donald Gunn

Personal details
- Born: Adolphus Henry Everand Barton; 1846 London, England
- Died: 20 May 1916 (aged 69-70) Stanthorpe, Queensland, Australia
- Resting place: Stanthorpe General Cemetery
- Party: Ministerial
- Spouse: Emma Churchill (m.1876 d.1946)
- Occupation: Pastoralist, Publican

Adolphus Henry Everand Barton (1846 – 20 May 1916) was a Pastoralist, and member of the Queensland Legislative Assembly.

== Early days ==
Barton was born in London to parents William Henry Barton and his wife Sarah Hannah. After arriving in Australia he was educated at Melbourne Church of England Grammar School. After two years gaining pastoral experience in New Zealand he became manager of his father's Armadilla Station in 1864. He then settled in Stanthorpe as a stock and station agent and later on became the licensee of Farley's Hotel in that town.

== Political career ==
Having been a member of the Stanthorpe Divisional Board, Barton was elected the member for Carnarvon in the Queensland Legislative Assembly in 1904. He held the seat until his defeat in 1907.

He was the chairman of the Stanthorpe Hospital Committee, Vice-President of the Board of Agricultural Association, and a Trustee of the Stanthorpe General Cemetery.

== Personal life ==
In 1876, Barton married Emma Churchill (died 1946) and together had two sons and five daughters.

He died in 1916 and was buried in Stanthorpe General Cemetery.

Parliament of Queensland
Preceded by Justin Foxton	Member for Carnarvon; 1904–1907	Succeeded by Donald Gunn
