= Edward Costello (politician) =

Australian politician and soldier

Major Edward Costello
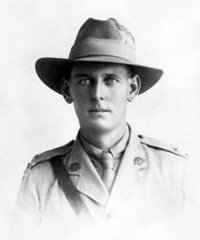

Member of the Queensland Legislative Assembly for Carnarvon
- In office 9 Oct 1920 – 11 May 1935
- Preceded by: Donald Gunn
- Succeeded by: Paul Hilton

Personal details
- Born: Edward Costello; 7 February 1883 Thane's Creek, Queensland, Australia
- Died: 27 June 1967 (aged 84) Warwick, Queensland, Australia
- Party: Country and Progressive National Party
- Other party: Country Party
- Spouse: Ruth Evelyn Harn (m.1924 d.1969)
- Occupation: Soldier, Grazier

Edward Costello (7 February 1883 – 27 June 1967) was an Australian soldier and grazier. He was a Member of the Queensland Legislative Assembly.

== Early days ==
Costello was born in Thane's Creek near Warwick, Queensland, to parents James Costello, and his wife Elizabeth Mary (née Ham). The Costello family took up mining grazing leases at Thanes Creek in 1881. Costello was educated at Thane State School. He followed in his father's footsteps in becoming a grazier.

== Military service ==
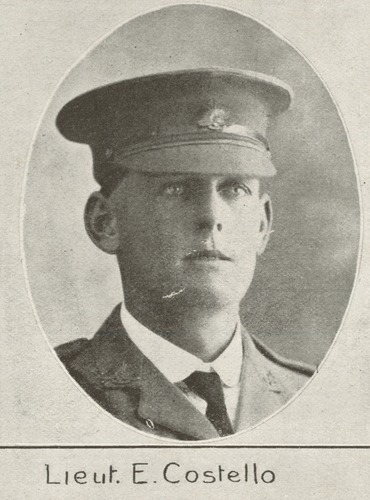
Lieutenant Edward Costello in 1915

Soon after the outbreak of World War I he joined the military and was the commanding officer of the 25th Battalion in the Australian Military Forces and a major of the 11th Light Horse Regiment.

He was awarded the Distinguished Service Order for bravery during the Battle of Semakh, on the Sea of Galilee on 25 September 1918. This action was claimed to be the only charge ever made by the British Cavalry before daylight. In 1919 he was the Chairman of the Military Courts for the Egyptian Rebellion.

== Political career ==
In 1920, Costello, as a Country Party candidate, won the seat of Carnarvon in the Queensland Legislative Assembly. In 1925 the party merged into the Country and Progressive National Party and Costello held Carnarvon until his defeat in 1935.

== Personal life ==
In 1924 his family purchased Seagoe, a grazing property at Thane. In 1924, Costello married Ruth Evelyn Harn (died 1969) and together had two sons and two daughters. He was a stalwart of the RSL Warwick Subbranch and a former patron of the Spurs and Feathers Club. He was a Presbyterian.

Costello died at Warwick in 1967 after suffering a long illness.

Parliament of Queensland
Preceded by Donald Gunn	Member for Carnarvon; 1920–1935	Succeeded by Paul Hilton
