= Peter McKechnie =

Australian politician

The Hon Peter McKechnie

Member of the Queensland Legislative Assembly for Carnarvon
- In office 7 December 1974 – 27 November 1989
- Preceded by: Henry McKechnie
- Succeeded by: Lawrence Springborg

Personal details
- Born: Peter Richard McKechnie; 9 February 1941 Goondiwindi, Queensland, Australia
- Died: 26 May 2011 (aged 70) Toowoomba, Queensland, Australia
- Party: National Party
- Spouse: Jeanette Ruth Morwood (m.1964)
- Relations: Henry McKechnie (father)
- Occupation: Grazier

Peter Richard McKechnie (9 February 1941 – 26 May 2011) was an Australian politician.

He was born in Goondiwindi to Henry McKechnie and Heather May, née Coulton. He worked as a station hand from 1957 to 1958 and a property manager from 1961 to 1968 before becoming a grazier in Charters Towers. He married Jeanette Ruth Morwood on 23 May 1964, with whom he had two children. In April 1974 he became electoral secretary to his father, who was the Country Party member for Carnarvon in the Queensland Legislative Assembly. When his father retired at the election that year, Peter McKechnie was elected as his successor. In 1983 he was appointed Minister for Tourism, National Parks, Sport and the Arts, moving to Industry and Technology in 1986 and to Family Services and Welfare Housing in 1987. In January 1989 he became Minister for Transport, but in September announced his retirement from politics to care for his wife, who was ill. McKechnie died in Toowoomba in 2011.

Parliament of Queensland
Preceded by Henry McKechnie	Member for Carnarvon; 1974–1989	Succeeded by Lawrence Springborg
