= Alfred Cowley =

Australian politician (1848–1926)

The Honourable Sir Alfred Cowley
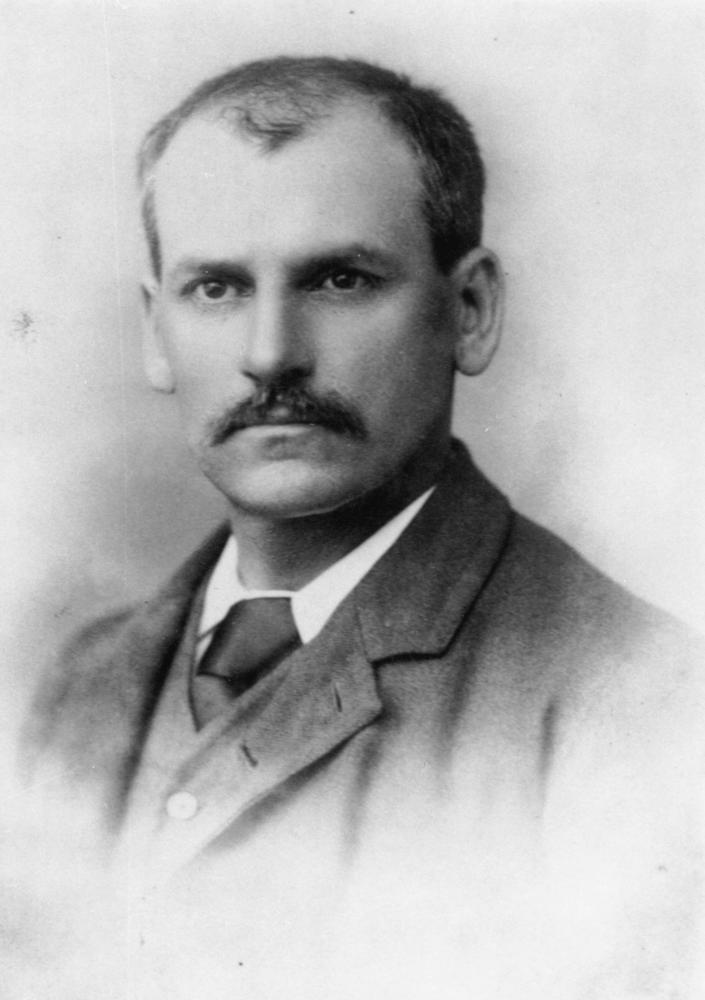

Speaker of the Queensland Parliament
- In office 25 May 1893 – 15 February 1899
- Preceded by: Albert Norton
- Succeeded by: Arthur Morgan
- Constituency: Herbert
- In office 17 September 1903 – 11 April 1907
- Preceded by: Arthur Morgan
- Succeeded by: John Leahy
- Constituency: Herbert

Member of the Queensland Legislative Assembly for Herbert
- In office 12 May 1888 – 18 May 1907
- Preceded by: New seat
- Succeeded by: William Lennon

Personal details
- Born: 24 April 1848 Fairford, Gloucestershire, England
- Died: 1 December 1926 (aged 78) Brisbane, Queensland
- Resting place: Toowong Cemetery
- Party: Ministerialist
- Spouse: Marie Campbell
- Occupation: Company director, Sugarcane farmer

Sir Alfred Sandlings Cowley (24 April 1848 – 1 December 1926) was a politician in Queensland, Australia. He was a Member of the Queensland Legislative Assembly.

== Early life ==
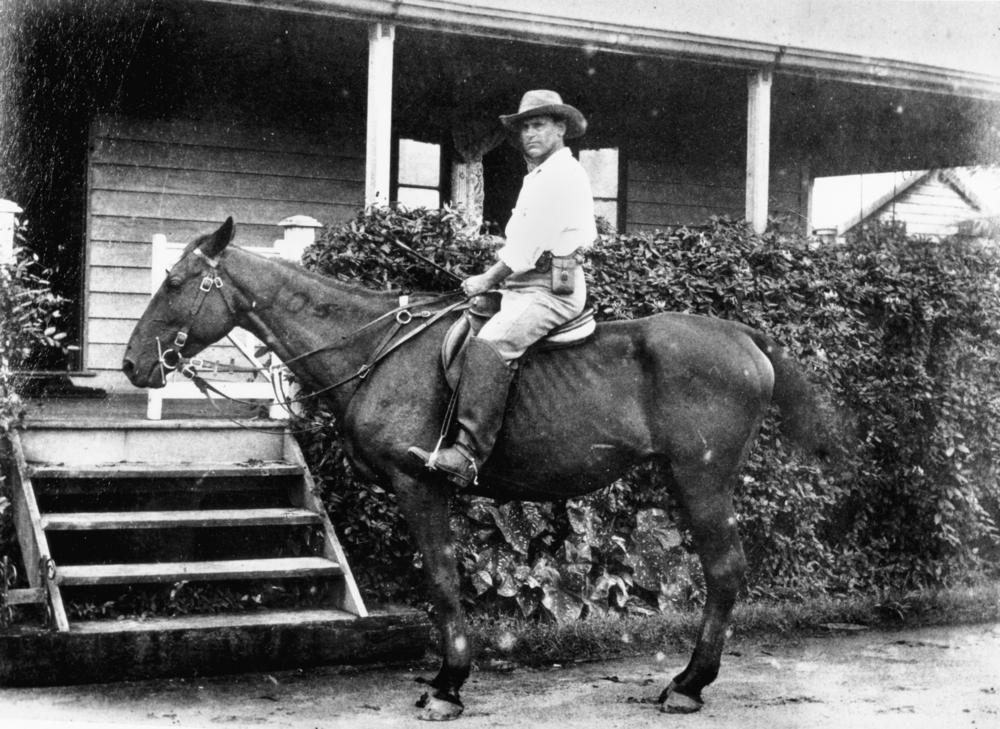
Sir Alfred Sandlings Cowley on a horse, manager's house, Hamleigh sugar plantation, circa 1887

Cowley was born in Fairford, Gloucestershire, England, the son of Isaac Cowley and Charlotte his wife. When still a boy he accompanied his parents to Natal, South Africa. He served an apprenticeship to the building and engineering trade, making the erection of sugar machinery a specialty; but he subsequently became an agriculturist, and was for three years engaged in cultivating sugar and coffee. Early in 1871 Cowley left Natal for the Australian colonies, and was a resident of New South Wales for over two years, part of which time he was in charge of a central sugar-mill on the Macleay River.

Cowley resided in the Maryborough district of Queensland for three years, during which time he was engaged in the cultivation and manufacture of sugar. After that Cowley settled in the Lower Herbert district, and was actively employed in the sugar industry.

Cowley was married at Pietermaritzburg, Natal, on 24 July 1880, to Miss Marie Campbell.

== Politics ==
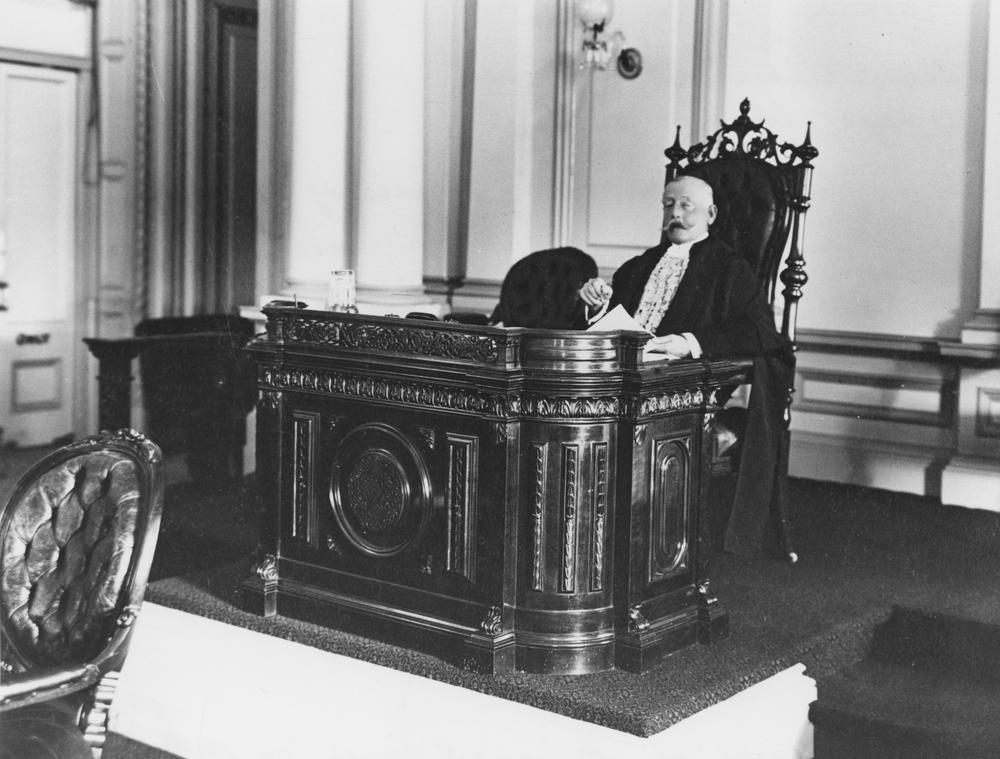
Sir Alfred Cowley in the speakers chair in the Queensland Legislative Assembly, circa 1906

Cowley was a member of the Hinchinbrook Divisional Board and was its chairman from 1883 to 1886.

Cowley was elected to the Queensland Legislative Assembly in the electoral district of Herbert on 12 May 1888, and on the formation of the Griffith–McIlwraith Government in August 1890 was appointed Secretary for Public Lands and Agriculture, and sworn of the Executive Council. He served as Speaker from 1893 to 1899 and from 1903 to 1907. He was knighted in 1904. His parliamentary service ended on 18 May 1907 when he was defeated in the 1907 election.

== Later life ==
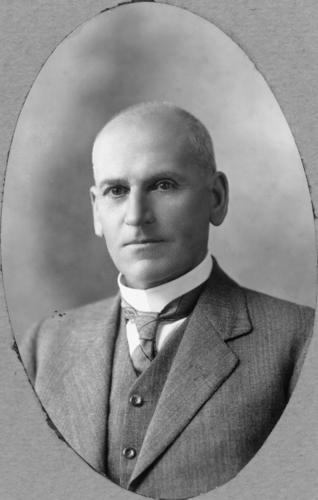
Sir Alfred Cowley

Cowley died on 1 December 1926 at his residence Silky Oaks in Cross Street, Toowong, Brisbane and was buried on 2 December in the Toowong Cemetery.

Parliament of Queensland
Preceded by Albert Norton	Speaker of the Legislative Assembly; 1893–1899	Succeeded by Arthur Morgan
Preceded by Arthur Morgan	Speaker of the Legislative Assembly; 1903–1907	Succeeded by John Leahy
New seat	Member for Herbert; 1888–1907	Succeeded by William Lennon
