= Lewis McDonald =

Australian politician (1881–1936)

The Hon Lewis McDonald
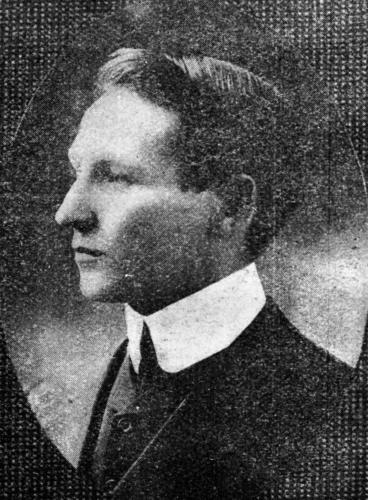
- Lewis McDonald ca. 1915

Queensland Legislative Council
- In office 10 October 1917 – 23 March 1922

Personal details
- Born: Lewis Richard McDonald; 22 December 1881 Lanark, Scotland
- Died: 18 September 1936 (aged 54) Brisbane, Queensland, Australia
- Party: Labor
- Spouse: Alexandra McDonald Hunter (m. 1911)
- Occupation: Trade union secretary

Lewis Richard McDonald (22 November 1881 – 18 September 1936) was an Australian politician. He was a Labor member of the Queensland Legislative Council from 1917 until its abolition in 1922. He was appointed as the first full-time state secretary of the ALP in Queensland in 1910 and was a long-serving Queensland delegate to the Australian Labor Party Federal Executive.
