= Jason Boles =

Australian politician

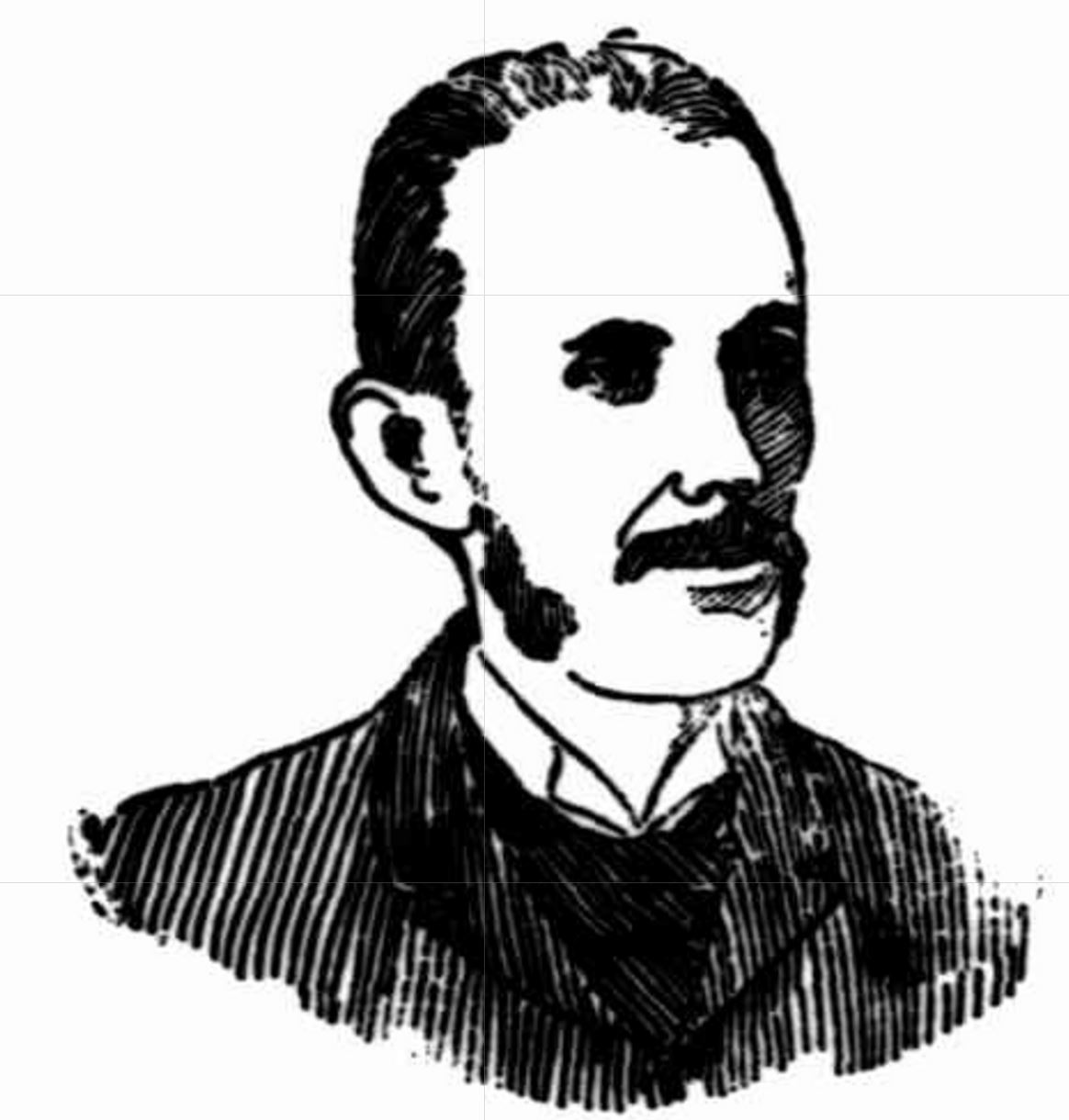
Sketch of Jason Boles, 1902

Jason Boles (April 1851 – 24 August 1920) was an Australian politician. He was a member of the Queensland Legislative Assembly from 1893 to 1904, representing the electorate of Port Curtis.

Boles was born in Madras in India. His parents moved to Sydney in 1852, ultimately arriving in Queensland in 1860. He worked as a stockman at Hilton Station and a mailman at Cania before going into business as a storekeeper. After operating stores at Cania, Millchester and Charters Towers, he settled in Gladstone in 1880. He was a Gladstone alderman from 1883 and its mayor in 1886 and in 1888–1889. Boles was also the first secretary of the Gladstone Turf Club and was president of the School of Arts.

Boles married Mary Breslin on 25 February 1878; she narrowly predeceased him.
