= John Kessell =

Australian politician

Member of the Queensland Legislative Assembly for Port Curtis
- In office 26 October 1912 – 22 May 1915
- Preceded by: Edward Breslin
- Succeeded by: George Carter

Personal details
- Born: John Henry Kessell; 1870 Kadina, South Australia, Australia
- Died: 15 November 1933 (aged 62–63) Lewisham, New South Wales, Australia
- Resting place: Field of Mars Cemetery
- Party: Ministerialist
- Spouse: Sarah Rosetta Watt (m. 1905)
- Occupation: Journalist

John Henry Kessell (1870 – 15 November 1933) was a member of the Queensland Legislative Assembly.

== Biography ==
Kessell was born in Kadina, South Australia, as the son of John Kessell and his wife Elizabeth (née Williams). He was educated in Bathurst and was a proprietor of the Gladstone Observer newspaper and the chairman director of the Mt. Morgan Co.

He married Sarah Rosetta Watt on 2 August 1905 in Brisbane and together they had one daughter. Kessell died at the Lewisham Private Hospital, New South Wales, and his funeral proceeded from the Ashfield Methodist Church to the Field of Mars Cemetery.

== Public life ==
Kessell, representing the Ministerialists, contested the seat of Port Curtis at the 1912 state election but lost by two votes to Edward Breslin. The election of Breslin was later declared null and void by Justice Charles Chubb, the elections judge of the Queensland Supreme Court and Kessell won the resulting by-election in October 1912. At the 1915 state election he lost the seat to George Carter.

He was president of the Australian Provincial Press Association and president of the Queensland Country Press Association.

Parliament of Queensland
Preceded by Edward Breslin	Member for Port Curtis; 1912–1915	Succeeded by George Carter
