= Edward Breslin =

Australian politician

Member of the Queensland Legislative Assembly for Port Curtis
- In office 2 October 1909 – 9 October 1912
- Preceded by: Robert Herbertson
- Succeeded by: John Kessell

Personal details
- Born: Edward Denis Joseph Breslin; 10 March 1882 Brisbane, Queensland, Australia
- Died: 26 August 1914 (aged 32) Gladstone, Queensland, Australia
- Party: Labour
- Education: St John's College, Sydney

Edward Denis Joseph Breslin (10 March 1882 – 26 August 1914) was a member of the Queensland Legislative Assembly.

== Biography ==
Breslin was born in Brisbane, Queensland, the son of Cornelius Connell Breslin and his wife Ellen (née Gallagher). He was educated at Nudgee College in Brisbane before attending St John's College, Sydney.

Breslin died at Gladstone in August 1914.

== Public life ==
Breslin, representing Labour, won the seat of Port Curtis in the Queensland Legislative Assembly at the 1909 state election. He held the seat in 1912 state election by two votes but the election of Breslin was later declared null and void by Justice Charles Chubb, the elections judge of the Queensland Supreme Court and he lost the resulting by-election in October 1912.

Parliament of Queensland
Preceded by Robert Herbertson	Member for Port Curtis; 1909–1912	Succeeded by John Kessell
