= Donald Gunn (Australian politician) =

Australian politician

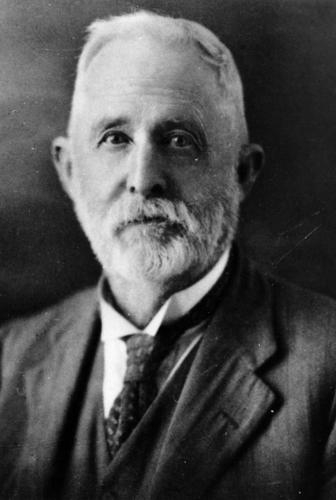

Member of the Queensland Legislative Assembly for Carnarvon
- In office 18 May 1907 – 9 Oct 1920
- Preceded by: Adolphus Barton
- Succeeded by: Edward Costello

Personal details
- Born: Donald Gunn; 19 February 1856 Burnima, New South Wales, Australia
- Died: 24 July 1943 (aged 87) Brisbane, Queensland, Australia
- Party: Ministerial
- Other political affiliations: National, Independent
- Spouse: Mary Anne Rattray Deuchar (m.1880 d.1924)
- Occupation: Wool grower

Donald Gunn (19 February 1856– 24 July 1943) was a Wool grower, and member of the Queensland Legislative Assembly.

== Early days ==
Gunn was born in Burnima, New South Wales, to parents Donald Gunn, a squatter from Scotland, and his wife Anna Sophia (née Hughes), an English-born governess. He was educated at Warwick State School, Brisbane Grammar School, and Townsend's School, Warwick. To avoid the free-selection mania in New South Wales the family moved to Queensland, and purchased Wyaga station, near Goondiwindi in 1861. Wyaga was sold two years later to fund the purchase of North Toolburra station near Warwick and Pikedale station near Stanthorpe.

In 1873 the young Gunn drove 10,000 sheep to Kensington Downs, near Bowen in 1873. He was supposed to manage this latest purchase but his father's forced retirement terminated this project and he moved back to manage Pikedale in 1874. The wool that was produced there was considered some of the best in the state and won several medals in the 1880s. His father died in 1885, and Gunn sold Pikedale station to the Queensland Co-operative Pastoral Co. He re-bought the by now debt ridden station in 1888 only to sell it a year later for £35,000. He managed a property until 1891 and then bought a grazing farm at Boonarga, near Talwood only to face floods, the bank crash and the long drought.

== Political career ==
In 1907 Gunn, standing as an independent, won the seat of Carnarvon in the Queensland Legislative Assembly. He was opposed to the premier of the time, Robert Philp, Australian Pastoral Co., and "all that class". He stood as a Ministerialist at the 1909 state elections and remained with them until 1915 when he joined the Queensland Liberals, and finally he joined the National Party in 1918. He retired from politics in 1920.

== Personal life ==
In 1880, Gunn married Mary Anne Rattray Deuchar (died 1924) and together had three sons and two daughters.

He died in 1943 and was cremated at Mount Thompson Crematorium.

Parliament of Queensland
Preceded by Adolphus Barton	Member for Carnarvon; 1907–1920	Succeeded by Edward Costello
