= William Lennon =

Australian politician

The Honourable William Lennon
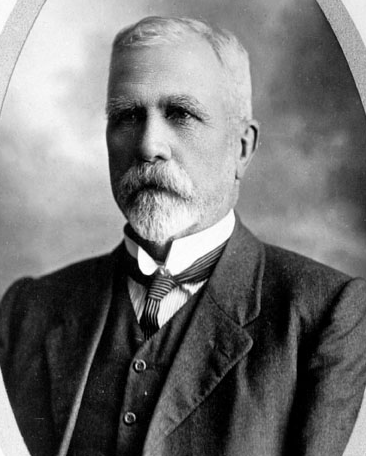
- Lennon as the Lieutenant-Governor of Queensland, 1927

8th President of the Queensland Legislative Council
- In office 18 August 1920 – 23 March 1922
- Preceded by: William Hamilton
- Succeeded by: Legislature abolished

Member of the Queensland Legislative Council
- In office 18 August 1920 – 23 March 1922; Life councillorship
- Commissioned by: Alfred Jones

15th Speaker of the Queensland Legislative Assembly
- In office 9 September 1919 – 9 January 1920
- Premier: T. J. Ryan; Ted Theodore
- Preceded by: William McCormack
- Succeeded by: William Bertram

Member of the Queensland Legislative Assembly for Herbert
- In office 18 May 1907 – 16 January 1920
- Preceded by: Alfred Cowley
- Succeeded by: Percy Pease

Personal details
- Born: William Lennon; 8 December 1849 Dublin, Ireland, United Kingdom
- Died: 5 May 1938 (aged 88) Brisbane, Queensland, Australia
- Resting place: Toowong Cemetery
- Party: Labor
- Spouse: Mary Cecilia Ryan (m. 1877; died 1937)
- Children: 5
- Education: Townsville Grammar School

William Lennon (8 December 1849 – 5 May 1938) was a politician in Queensland, Australia. He was a Member of the Queensland Legislative Assembly and a Member of the Queensland Legislative Council. He was Lieutenant-Governor of Queensland.

== Biography ==
Lennon was born in Dublin, Ireland to parents William Lennon Snr and his wife Ann (née Martin). Arriving with his family in Melbourne in 1855 he received his education there and by 1870 he was employed as a clerk with the Victorian Mines Department. In 1874 he joined the Bank of Australasia and was posted at Creswick and it was here that he made friends with David Temple and William Spence, two pioneers of the trade union movement in Australia.

In 1881 he was transferred to Townsville to open a branch of the bank there and later supervised its expansion to other centres in North Queensland and by 1885 he was working in Sydney as a sub-inspector. He left the bank a year later to take up the role of manager of Burns, Philp & Co. Ltd. He was employed there for ten years but clashes with James Burns over administrative procedures and salary levels led to his resignation and Lennon then established his own mercantile and auctioneering business in Townsville. He was a director of the Bank of North Queensland and the Townsville Gas Company.

On 29 November 1877 Lennon married Mary Cecilia Ryan (died 1937) at Ballarat and together had three sons and three daughters. He died in Brisbane in May 1938 after several years of bad health. As per Lennon's personal wishes, his family declined the offer of a state funeral and his funeral at the Toowong Cemetery was attended by a few close relatives.

== Public career ==
Lennon started off his career by being a councilor on the Thuringowa Divisional Board. Then at the 1899 Queensland colonial election, representing the Labour Party, he unsuccessfully stood against his former employer, Robert Philp, for the seat of Townsville. In 1907, he stood for the seat of Herbert and narrowly defeated the sitting member, Alfred Cowley. He would go on to represent the electorate until his resignation on 1920 to take up the role of Lieutenant-Governor of Queensland. For the last four months he was the Speaker of the Queensland Legislative Assembly and from 1915 until 1919 the Secretary for Agriculture and Stock.

When the first majority Labor government came to power in 1915, it found itself up against a hostile Queensland Legislative Council. The Labour Party saw the Council as undemocratic and a tool of patronage and wanted it abolished. After Bills for this purpose were rejected by the Council itself in 1915 and 1916, the government held a referendum to abolish it in 1917, but the people of Queensland rejected it.

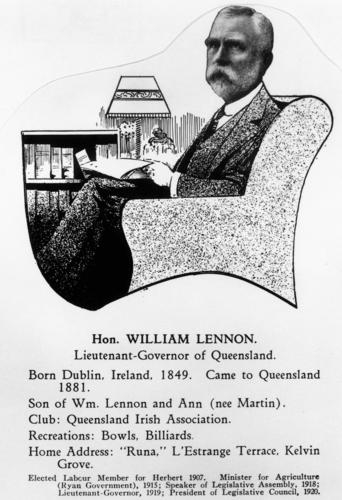
Hon. William Lennon – taken from The Men Of Queensland 1929

Soon after the referendum, and apparently on the urging of the Labor government, the Queensland Governor, Sir Hamilton Goold-Adams appointed thirteen new members, all of whom whose political allegiance lay with Labor, to the Council. As the council continued to reject money bills, Ryan urged the Governor to appoint more members to the Council in 1918, but this request was refused. Goold-Adams' term as Governor of Queensland expired in 1920 and before he set sail back home to England, appointed Lennon to the role of Lieutenant-Governor of Queensland with a salary of £1000 per annum.

Once Lennon took the role of Lieutenant-Governor he immediately appointed another fifteen Labor men (known as the suicide squad) to the Council, much to the disgust of the "old Guard" members such as Arthur Hawthorn and Patrick Leahy.

When the President of the Legislative Council William Hamilton died in July 1920, Lennon claimed that he had to leave Queensland and travel to New South Wales which in turn made Pope Alexander Cooper the Administrator of the Government.

Cooper was presented with minutes from the Executive Council appointing Lennon to the Legislative Council and also appointing him as President of the Legislative Council. Cooper refused to sign the minutes stating the Council was already overburdened and the trick of sending Lennon out of state was a farce. Lennon returned to Queensland having recovered from the ill health he claimed to have and reassumed office as Lieutenant-Governor. Lennon then appointed himself, not only to be Hamilton's replacement in the Council, but to the role of President as well. In December 1920 Matthew Nathan became the State Governor and Lennon ceased acting as Administrator.

The next year the Council, now with an overwhelming Labor majority, voted itself out of existence with the Constitution Act Amendment Bill. The Council met for the last time on 27 October 1921 and the bill was given royal assent on 23 March 1922. Lennon remained the salaried Lieutenant-Governor until the Labor government lost power in 1929.

Parliament of Queensland
Preceded by William Hamilton	President of the Queensland Legislative Council; 1920–1922	Abolished
Preceded by William McCormack	Speaker of the Queensland Legislative Assembly; 1919–1920	Succeeded by William Bertram
Preceded by Alfred Cowley	Member for Herbert; 1907–1920	Succeeded by Percy Pease
