= Electoral district of Carnarvon =

Former state electoral district of Queensland, Australia

Carnarvon Queensland—Legislative Assembly
- State: Queensland
- Created: 1873
- Abolished: 1992
- Namesake: Carnarvon Range
- Demographic: Rural

Carnarvon was an electoral district of the Legislative Assembly in the Australian state of Queensland that existed from 1873 to 1992.

The district took in rural areas in southern Queensland, including the towns of Stanthorpe and Goondiwindi.

== Members for Carnarvon ==
Member	Party	Term
Ratcliffe Pring		1873–1874
William Miles		1874–1875
John Tyrel		1876–1883
Justin Foxton	Conservative	1883–1890
Justin Foxton	Ministerial	1890–1903
Justin Foxton	Conservative	1903–1904
Adolphus Barton	Liberal	1904–1907
Adolphus Barton	Kidstonites	1907
Donald Gunn	Independent	1907–1909
Donald Gunn	Liberal	1909–1917
Donald Gunn	National	1917–1920
Edward Costello	Country	1920–1925
Edward Costello	CPNP	1925–1935
Paul Hilton	Labor	1935–1957
Paul Hilton	QLP	1957–1963
Henry McKechnie	Country	1963–1974
Peter McKechnie	National	1974–1989
Lawrence Springborg	National	1989–1992

== See also ==
- Electoral districts of Queensland
- Members of the Queensland Legislative Assembly by year
- Category:Members of the Queensland Legislative Assembly by name
