= Electoral district of Herbert =

Herbert Queensland—Legislative Assembly
- State: Queensland
- Created: 1888
- Abolished: 1950
- Demographic: Rural
- Coordinates: 17°50′S 146°2′E

Herbert was a Legislative Assembly electorate in the state (colony until 1901) of Queensland.

== History ==
Herbert was created in 1888. It was located in north-east Queensland, initially from Cairns to Townsville. It was abolished in the 1949 redistribution (taking effect at the 1950 elections), being incorporated into the newly created Electoral district of Mourilyan.

== Members ==
The following people were elected in the seat of Herbert:

Member	Party	Term
Alfred Cowley	Ministerial	12 May 1888 – 18 May 1907
William Lennon	Labor	18 May 1907 – 16 Jan 1920
Percy Pease	Labor	10 Apr 1920 – 17 Sep 1940
Stephen Theodore	Labor	9 Nov 1940 – 29 Apr 1950

== See also ==
- Electoral districts of Queensland
- Members of the Queensland Legislative Assembly by year
- Category:Members of the Queensland Legislative Assembly by name
- Division of Herbert for the federal House of Representatives electorate of the same name
