= Electoral district of Port Curtis =

Port Curtis Queensland—Legislative Assembly
- State: Queensland
- Created: 1860
- Abolished: 1992
- Namesake: Port Curtis

Port Curtis was an electoral district of the Legislative Assembly in the Australian state of Queensland from 1860 to 1992.

The district was named after the harbour at Port Curtis, and centred on the regional city of Gladstone. In 1992, it was renamed Gladstone.

== Members for Port Curtis ==
Member	Party	Term
Charles Fitzsimmons	Unaligned	1860–1861
Alfred Sandeman	Unaligned	1861–1863
John Douglas	Unaligned	1863–1866
Sir Arthur Palmer	Unaligned	1866–1878
Albert Norton	Unaligned	1878–1893
Jason Boles	Opposition	1893–1904
Robert Herbertson	Ministerialist/Opposition	1904–1909
Edward Breslin	Labor	1909–1912
John Kessell	Ministerialist	1912–1915
George Carter	Labor	1915–1920
John Fletcher	National	1920–1923
George Carter	Labor	1923–1929
Frank Butler	Country and Progressive National	1929–1932
Tommy Williams	Labor	1932–1947
Jim Burrows	Labor	1947–1963
Martin Hanson	Labor	1963–1976
Bill Prest	Labor	1976–1992

== See also ==
- Electoral districts of Queensland
- Members of the Queensland Legislative Assembly by year
- Category:Members of the Queensland Legislative Assembly by name
