= 1912 Queensland state election =

- 27 April 1912

All 72 seats in the Legislative Assembly of Queensland 37 Assembly seats were needed for a majority
- Turnout: 75.52 (▲2.85 pp)
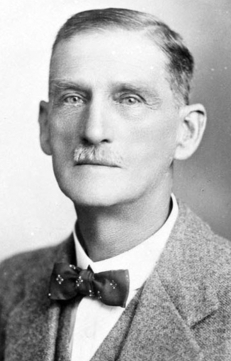

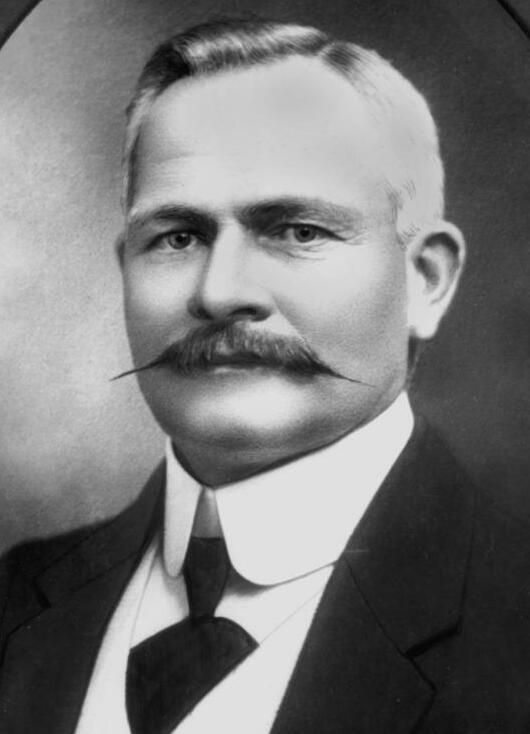
	First party	Second party
Leader	Digby Denham	David Bowman
Party	Liberal	Labor
Leader since	7 February 1911	15 April 1907
Leader's seat	Oxley	Fortitude Valley
Last election	41 seats, 50.91%	27 seats, 36.85%
Seats won	46	25
Seat change	▲5	▼2
Popular vote	110,981	100,878
Percentage	51.37%	46.70%
Swing	▲0.46	▲9.85
Premier before election
Digby Denham
Liberal
Elected Premier
Digby Denham
Liberal

Elections were held in the Australian state of Queensland on 27 April 1912 to elect the 72 members of the state's Legislative Assembly.

The election was the first for the recently formed Liberal government of Digby Denham, who had been premier since 7 February 1911. The opposition Labor Party was led by David Bowman, who had been Labor leader since 15 April 1907.

This election used contingent voting in single-member districts. Five districts that had been two-seat districts - Mackay, Maryborough, North Brisbane, Rockhampton and South Brisbane - were reformed and hereafter have only one seat.

== Results ==
Denham and his government were returned to office despite a swing to Labor of almost 10 percent. This was largely due to winning newly created seats in rural areas, while losing seats in Brisbane which mostly went to Labor.

Queensland state election, 27 April 1912 Legislative Assembly << 1909–1915 >>
Enrolled voters	309,590				
Votes cast	216,032		Turnout	75.52	+2.85
Informal votes	N/A		Informal	N/A	N/A
Summary of votes by party
Party	Primary votes	%	Swing	Seats	Change
Liberals	110,981	51.37	+0.46	46	+5
Labour	100,878	46.70	+9.85	25	–2
Independent	3,766	1.74	+0.14	1	+1
Total	216,032			72	

== See also ==
- Members of the Queensland Legislative Assembly, 1909–1912
- Members of the Queensland Legislative Assembly, 1912–1915
- Denham Ministry
