= Electoral results for the district of Kennedy =

Queensland, Australia, district election results

This is a list of electoral results for the electoral district of Kennedy in Queensland state elections.

== Members for Kennedy ==
The members for Kennedy were:

Member	Party	Term		
George Elphinstone Dalrymple	none	18 Mar 1865 – 19 Jul 1867		
Thomas Henry FitzGerald	none	19 Jul 1867 – 11 June 1869		
John Bright	none	10 July 1869 – 8 Jul 1870		
Edward MacDevitt	none	15 Sep 1870 – 18 Nov 1873		
John Murtagh Macrossan	none	25 Nov 1873 – 28 Nov 1878	Member 2 (1878–1888)	Party
Henry Wyndham Palmer	none	28 Nov 1878 – 5 Oct 1883	Francis Horace Stubley	none
Isidor Lissner	Ministerial	5 Oct 1883 – 12 May 1888	Sir Arthur Rutledge	Ministerial
Isidor Lissner	Ministerial	12 May 1888 – 13 May 1893		
George Jackson	Labor	13 May 1893 – 2 Oct 1909		
James O'Sullivan	Labor	2 Oct 1909 – 9 Oct 1920		
John Jones	Northern Country	9 Oct 1920 – 12 May 1923		
Harry Bruce	Labor	12 May 1923 – 11 June 1932		
Arthur Fadden	CPNP	11 June 1932 – 11 May 1935		
Cecil Jesson	Labor	11 May 1935 – 29 Apr 1950		

== Election results ==
=== Elections in the 1940s ===
1947 Queensland state election: Kennedy
Party	Candidate	Votes	%	±%
Labor	Cecil Jesson	4,331	44.8	−5.9
People's Party	Robert Johnston	4,079	42.2	+19.1
Communist	John Clubley	1,264	13.1	−13.1
Total formal votes		9,674	98.2	+0.3
Informal votes		178	1.8	−0.3
Turnout		9,852	85.7	+3.4
Labor hold		Swing	N/A	

1944 Queensland state election: Kennedy
Party	Candidate	Votes	%	±%
Labor	Cecil Jesson	4,297	50.7	−7.0
Communist	John Clubley	2,220	26.2	+15.3
People's Party	Aubrey Jurd	1,954	23.1	+23.1
Total formal votes		8,471	97.9	−0.3
Informal votes		180	2.1	+0.3
Turnout		8,651	82.3	−6.1
Labor hold		Swing	N/A	

1941 Queensland state election: Kennedy
Party	Candidate	Votes	%	±%
Labor	Cecil Jesson	5,210	57.7	−6.1
Country	Aubrey Jurd	2,833	31.4	−4.8
Communist	Florence Milburn	980	10.9	+10.9
Total formal votes		9,023	98.2	+0.3
Informal votes		161	1.8	−0.3
Turnout		9,184	88.4	−1.7
Labor hold		Swing	+1.0	

- Preferences were not distributed.

=== Elections in the 1930s ===
1938 Queensland state election: Kennedy
Party	Candidate	Votes	%	±%
Labor	Cecil Jesson	5,492	63.8	−0.1
Country	James Kennedy	3,120	36.2	+0.1
Total formal votes		8,612	97.9	+1.1
Informal votes		183	2.1	−1.1
Turnout		8,795	90.1	−1.4
Labor hold		Swing	−0.1	

1935 Queensland state election: Kennedy
Party	Candidate	Votes	%	±%
Labor	Cecil Jesson	5,160	63.9	
CPNP	John Jackson	2,920	36.1	
Total formal votes		8,080	96.8	
Informal votes		267	3.2	
Turnout		8,347	91.5	
Labor gain from CPNP		Swing		

1932 Queensland state election: Kennedy
Party	Candidate	Votes	%	±%
CPNP	Arthur Fadden	3,747	50.6	
Labor	Patrick Hayes	3,653	49.4	
Total formal votes		7,400	98.4	
Informal votes		119	1.6	
Turnout		7,519	92.2	
CPNP gain from Labor		Swing		

=== Elections in the 1920s ===
1929 Queensland state election: Kennedy
Party	Candidate	Votes	%	±%
Labor	Harry Bruce	3,405	55.4	+5.2
CPNP	Henry Hollins	2,738	44.6	+1.3
Total formal votes		6,143		
Informal votes				
Turnout				
Labor hold		Swing	N/A	

1926 Queensland state election: Kennedy
Party	Candidate	Votes	%	±%
Labor	Harry Bruce	3,122	50.2	−1.2
CPNP	William Green	2,694	43.3	−5.3
Primary Producers	John Young	405	6.5	+6.5
Total formal votes		6,221	98.8	+0.4
Informal votes		75	1.2	−0.4
Turnout		6,296	89.9	+4.9
Labor hold		Swing	N/A	

1923 Queensland state election: Kennedy
Party	Candidate	Votes	%	±%
Labor	Harry Bruce	2,757	51.4	+3.4
United	John Clegg	2,612	48.6	−3.4
Total formal votes		5,369	98.4	+0.2
Informal votes		88	1.6	−0.2
Turnout		5,457	85.0	+8.5
Labor gain from United		Swing	+3.4	

1920 Queensland state election: Kennedy
Party	Candidate	Votes	%	±%
Northern Country	John Jones	1,102	52.0	+52.0
Labor	James O'Sullivan	1,016	48.0	−13.1
Total formal votes		2,118	98.2	+0.1
Informal votes		38	1.8	−0.1
Turnout		2,156	76.5	0.0
Northern Country gain from Labor		Swing	N/A	

=== Elections in the 1910s ===
1918 Queensland state election: Kennedy
Party	Candidate	Votes	%	±%
Labor	James O'Sullivan	1,328	61.1	−6.7
National	Andrew Taylor	846	38.9	+6.7
Total formal votes		2,174	98.1	+1.2
Informal votes		42	1.9	−1.2
Turnout		2,216	76.5	−14.3
Labor hold		Swing	−6.7	

1915 Queensland state election: Kennedy
Party	Candidate	Votes	%	±%
Labor	James O'Sullivan	1,594	67.8	+10.3
Liberal	John Houghton	756	32.2	−10.3
Total formal votes		2,350	96.9	−0.9
Informal votes		76	3.1	+0.9
Turnout		2,426	82.9	+8.3
Labor hold		Swing	+10.3	

1912 Queensland state election: Kennedy
Party	Candidate	Votes	%	±%
Labor	James O'Sullivan	1,445	57.5	
Liberal	Osborn Fenwick	1,070	42.5	
Total formal votes		2,515	97.8	
Informal votes		56	2.2	
Turnout		2,571	77.5	
Labor hold		Swing		
