= Electoral results for the district of Maranoa =

Queensland, Australia, district election results

This is a list of electoral results for the electoral district of Maranoa in Queensland state elections.

== Members for Maranoa ==
The members who represented the electorate were:

| Member | Party | Term |
|---|---|---|
| John Ferrett | | 4 May 1860 - 27 June 1863 |
| William Kennedy | | 27 June 1863 - 28 July 1864 |
| William Miles | | 27 September 1864 - 25 November 1873 |
| Sir Thomas McIlwraith | Ministerialist | 25 November 1873 - 20 November 1878 |
| James Lalor | | 5 December 1878 - 12 May 1888 |
| Robert Dunsmure | | 12 May 1888 - 13 May 1893 |
| Robert King | ALP | 13 May 1893 - 18 March 1899 |
| Sir Arthur Rutledge | Ministerialist | 18 March 1899 - 27 August 1904 |
| Thomas Spencer | Ministerialist | 27 August 1904 - 18 May 1907 |
| John Hunter | ALP | 18 May 1907 - 22 October 1919 |
| Thomas Spencer | PPC | 20 December 1919 - 9 October 1920 |
| Charles Conroy | ALP | 9 October 1920 - 15 April 1944 |
| John Taylor | ALP | 15 April 1944 - 29 April 1950 |

== Election results ==
=== Elections in the 1940s ===
1947 Queensland state election: Maranoa
| Party | Candidate | Votes | % | ±% |
|---|---|---|---|---|
| Labor | John Taylor | 4,319 | 59.9 | +3.7 |
| Country | Finlay Skinner | 2,896 | 40.1 | −3.7 |
| Total formal votes | | 7,215 | 98.6 | +0.3 |
| Informal votes | | 104 | 1.4 | −0.3 |
| Turnout | | 7,319 | 86.3 | +4.7 |
| Labor hold | | Swing | +3.7 | |

1944 Queensland state election: Maranoa
| Party | Candidate | Votes | % | ±% |
|---|---|---|---|---|
| Labor | John Taylor | 3,832 | 56.2 | −3.0 |
| Country | Henry Crothers | 2,987 | 43.8 | +3.0 |
| Total formal votes | | 6,819 | 98.3 | +0.1 |
| Informal votes | | 116 | 1.7 | −0.1 |
| Turnout | | 6,935 | 81.6 | −0.1 |
| Labor hold | | Swing | −3.0 | |

1941 Queensland state election: Maranoa
| Party | Candidate | Votes | % | ±% |
|---|---|---|---|---|
| Labor | Charles Conroy | 4,301 | 59.2 | −0.8 |
| Country | Leslie Brown | 2,961 | 40.8 | +0.8 |
| Total formal votes | | 7,262 | 98.2 | +2.3 |
| Informal votes | | 136 | 1.8 | −2.3 |
| Turnout | | 7,398 | 81.7 | −6.7 |
| Labor hold | | Swing | −0.8 | |

=== Elections in the 1930s ===
1938 Queensland state election: Maranoa
| Party | Candidate | Votes | % | ±% |
|---|---|---|---|---|
| Labor | Charles Conroy | 4,476 | 60.0 | −10.5 |
| Country | Royland Hembrow | 2,986 | 40.0 | +40.0 |
| Total formal votes | | 7,462 | 95.9 | −1.4 |
| Informal votes | | 321 | 4.1 | +1.4 |
| Turnout | | 7,783 | 88.4 | +2.1 |
| Labor hold | | Swing | N/A | |

1935 Queensland state election: Maranoa
| Party | Candidate | Votes | % | ±% |
|---|---|---|---|---|
| Labor | Charles Conroy | 5,148 | 70.5 | |
| Social Credit | Herman Brus | 2,158 | 29.5 | |
| Total formal votes | | 7,306 | 97.3 | |
| Informal votes | | 205 | 2.7 | |
| Turnout | | 7,511 | 86.3 | |
| Labor hold | | Swing | | |

1932 Queensland state election: Maranoa
| Party | Candidate | Votes | % | ±% |
|---|---|---|---|---|
| Labor | Charles Conroy | 4,148 | 62.2 | |
| CPNP | Ernest Thomas | 2,360 | 35.4 | |
| Queensland Party | Daniel O'Brien | 164 | 2.5 | |
| Total formal votes | | 6,672 | 99.0 | |
| Informal votes | | 70 | 1.0 | |
| Turnout | | 6,742 | 90.2 | |
| Labor hold | | Swing | | |

- Preferences were not distributed.

=== Elections in the 1920s ===
1929 Queensland state election: Maranoa
| Party | Candidate | Votes | % | ±% |
|---|---|---|---|---|
| Labor | Charles Conroy | 2,728 | 52.4 | −2.4 |
| CPNP | Arthur Miscamble | 2,475 | 47.6 | +2.4 |
| Total formal votes | | 5,203 | 99.4 | +2.7 |
| Informal votes | | 30 | 0.6 | −2.7 |
| Turnout | | 5,233 | 89.1 | −0.5 |
| Labor hold | | Swing | −2.4 | |

1926 Queensland state election: Maranoa
| Party | Candidate | Votes | % | ±% |
|---|---|---|---|---|
| Labor | Charles Conroy | 2,514 | 54.8 | −2.7 |
| CPNP | Arthur Miscamble | 2,072 | 45.2 | +45.2 |
| Total formal votes | | 4,586 | 96.7 | −3.0 |
| Informal votes | | 158 | 3.3 | +3.0 |
| Turnout | | 4,744 | 89.6 | +6.7 |
| Labor hold | | Swing | −2.7 | |

1923 Queensland state election: Maranoa
| Party | Candidate | Votes | % | ±% |
|---|---|---|---|---|
| Labor | Charles Conroy | 2,416 | 57.5 | +6.8 |
| Independent Country | Frederick Duncombe | 1,951 | 42.5 | +42.5 |
| Total formal votes | | 4,590 | 99.7 | +0.4 |
| Informal votes | | 14 | 0.3 | −0.4 |
| Turnout | | 4,604 | 82.9 | +2.2 |
| Labor hold | | Swing | N/A | |

1920 Queensland state election: Maranoa
| Party | Candidate | Votes | % | ±% |
|---|---|---|---|---|
| Labor | Charles Conroy | 2,416 | 50.7 | −8.4 |
| Country | Thomas Spencer | 2,350 | 49.3 | +49.3 |
| Total formal votes | | 4,766 | 99.3 | +0.3 |
| Informal votes | | 31 | 0.7 | −0.3 |
| Turnout | | 4,797 | 80.7 | +2.5 |
| Labor gain from National | | Swing | −8.4 | |

=== Elections in the 1910s ===
1919 Maranoa state by-election
| Party | Candidate | Votes | % | ±% |
|---|---|---|---|---|
| Primary Producers | Thomas Spencer | 2,250 | 51.4 | +51.4 |
| Labor | James MacDougall | 2,127 | 48.6 | −10.5 |
| Total formal votes | | 4,377 | | |
| Informal votes | | | | |
| Turnout | | | | |
| Primary Producers gain from Labor | | Swing | N/A | |

1918 Queensland state election: Maranoa
| Party | Candidate | Votes | % | ±% |
|---|---|---|---|---|
| Labor | John Hunter | 2,490 | 59.1 | −9.9 |
| National | Robert Swan | 1,722 | 40.9 | +9.9 |
| Total formal votes | | 4,212 | 99.0 | +0.4 |
| Informal votes | | 41 | 1.0 | −0.4 |
| Turnout | | 4,253 | 78.2 | −2.2 |
| Labor hold | | Swing | −9.9 | |

1915 Queensland state election: Maranoa
| Party | Candidate | Votes | % | ±% |
|---|---|---|---|---|
| Labor | John Hunter | 2,554 | 69.0 | +6.6 |
| Liberal | Francis Dyer | 1,148 | 31.0 | −6.6 |
| Total formal votes | | 3,702 | 98.5 | −0.6 |
| Informal votes | | 55 | 1.5 | +0.6 |
| Turnout | | 3,757 | 83.2 | +12.8 |
| Labor hold | | Swing | +6.6 | |

1912 Queensland state election: Maranoa
| Party | Candidate | Votes | % | ±% |
|---|---|---|---|---|
| Labor | John Hunter | 1,819 | 62.4 | |
| Liberal | Aaron Hoskin | 1,095 | 37.6 | |
| Total formal votes | | 2,914 | 99.1 | |
| Informal votes | | 26 | 0.9 | |
| Turnout | | 2,940 | 70.4 | |
| Labor hold | | Swing | | |
