= Members of the Queensland Legislative Assembly, 1918–1920 =

This is a list of members of the 21st Legislative Assembly of Queensland from 1918 to 1920, as elected at the 1918 state election held on 16 March 1918.

During the term, several National Party members switched allegiance to the new Country Party.

Name	Party	Electorate	Term in office
John Appel	National/Country	Albert	1908–1929
Thomas Armfield	Labor	Musgrave	1915–1920
George Barber	Labor	Bundaberg	1901–1935
George Barnes	National	Warwick	1908–1935
Walter Barnes	National	Bulimba	1901–1915, 1918–1933
Percy Bayley	Ind. Nat.	Pittsworth	1915–1920
William Bebbington	National/Country	Drayton	1912–1923
Ernest Bell	National/Country	Fassifern	1913–1930
William Bertram	Labor	Maree	1912–1929
Frank Brennan	Labor	Toowoomba	1918–1925
Frank Bulcock^{[1]}	Labor	Barcoo	1919–1942
Cuthbert Butler	Labor	Lockyer	1918–1920
George Carter	Labor	Port Curtis	1915–1920, 1923–1929
Charles Collins	Labor	Bowen	1909–1912, 1915–1936
Frank Cooper	Labor	Bremer	1915–1946
William Cooper	Labor	Rosewood	1918–1929
Bernard Corser	National/Country	Burnett	1912–1928
Harry Coyne	Labor	Warrego	1908–1923
Thomas Dunstan	Labor	Gympie	1915–1929, 1935–1953
Cecil Elphinstone	National	Oxley	1918–1929
Hon John Fihelly	Labor	Paddington	1912–1922
Thomas Foley	Labor	Mundingburra	1909–1920
Tom Foley^{[2]}	Labor	Leichhardt	1919–1960
Frank Forde	Labor	Rockhampton	1917–1922, 1955–1957
Edgar Free	Labor	South Brisbane	1915–1920
James Fry	National	Kurilpa	1918–1932
John Gilday	Labor	Ithaca	1912–1926
William Gillies	Labor	Eacham	1912–1925
David Gledson	Labor	Ipswich	1915–1929, 1932–1949
Francis Grayson	Ind. Nat.	Cunningham	1904–1920
Donald Gunn	National	Carnarvon	1907–1920
Herbert Hardacre^{[2]}	Labor	Leichhardt	1893–1919
Harry Hartley	Labor	Fitzroy	1915–1929
Robert Hodge	National/Country	Nanango	1902–1904; 1909–1920
John McEwan Hunter^{[3]}	Labor	Maranoa	1907–1919
John Huxham	Labor	Buranda	1908–1909, 1912–1924
Alfred James	Labor/Country	Logan	1918–1920
Mick Kirwan	Labor	Brisbane	1912–1932
Edward Land	Labor	Balonne	1904–1927
William Lloyd	Labor	Enoggera	1915–1920, 1923–1929
James Larcombe	Labor	Keppel	1912–1929, 1932–1956
William Lennon^{[4]}	Labor	Herbert	1907–1920
Edward Macartney	National	Toowong	1900–1908; 1909–1920
Hon William McCormack	Labor	Cairns	1912–1930
Peter McLachlan	Labor	Merthyr	1908–1912, 1915–1920, 1923–1929
Arthur Moore	National/Country	Aubigny	1915–1941
Godfrey Morgan	National/Country	Murilla	1909–1938
John Mullan	Labor	Flinders	1908–1912, 1918–1941
James O'Sullivan	Labor	Kennedy	1909–1920
John Payne	Labor	Mitchell	1905–1928
Percy Pease^{[4]}	Labor	Herbert	1920–1940
Jens Peterson	Labor	Normanby	1915–1935
Andrew Lang Petrie	National	Toombul	1893–1926
George Pollock	Labor	Gregory	1915–1939
Darby Riordan	Labor	Burke	1918–1929
Robert Roberts	National	East Toowoomba	1907–1934
Daniel Ryan	Labor	Townsville	1915–1920
Henry Ryan	Labor	Cook	1915–1929
T. J. Ryan^{[1]}	Labor	Barcoo	1909–1919
Hubert Sizer	National	Nundah	1918–1935
William Forgan Smith	Labor	Mackay	1915–1942
Henry Plantagenet Somerset	National	Stanley	1904–1920
Thomas Spencer^{[3]}	National/Country	Maranoa	1904–1907; 1919–1920
James Stopford	Labor	Mount Morgan	1915–1936
Edward Swayne	National/Country	Mirani	1907–1935
Charles Taylor	National	Windsor	1918–1935
Hon Ted Theodore	Labor	Chillagoe	1909–1925
Andrew Thompson	Labor	Wide Bay	1918–1920
William Vowles	National/Country	Dalby	1911–1926
Harry Walker	National/Country	Cooroora	1907–1947
Richard Warren	National/Country	Murrumba	1918–1932
David Weir	Labor	Maryborough	1917–1929
William Wellington	Labor	Charters Towers	1915–1939
Albert Whitford	Labor	Burrum	1918–1920
Thomas Wilson	Labor	Fortitude Valley	1916–1933
Vern Winstanley	Labor	Queenton	1908–1932

== Notes ==
^{1} On 14 October 1919, the Premier of Queensland and Labor member for Barcoo, T. J. Ryan, resigned to run for West Sydney at the 1919 federal election. Labor candidate Frank Bulcock won the resulting by-election on 20 December 1919.
^{2} On 14 October 1919, the Labor member for Leichhardt, Herbert Hardacre, resigned. Labor candidate Tom Foley won the resulting by-election on 20 December 1919.
^{3} On 22 October 1919, the Labor member for Maranoa, John McEwan Hunter, resigned to take up the role of the Queensland Agent-General in England. Country candidate Thomas Spencer won the resulting by-election on 20 December 1919.
^{4} On 16 January 1920, the Labor member for Herbert, William Lennon, resigned. Labor candidate Percy Pease won the resulting by-election on 10 April 1920.

== See also ==
- 1918 Queensland state election
- Ryan Ministry (Labor) (1915–1919)
- Theodore Ministry (Labor) (1919–1925)
