= Hunter's Emporium =

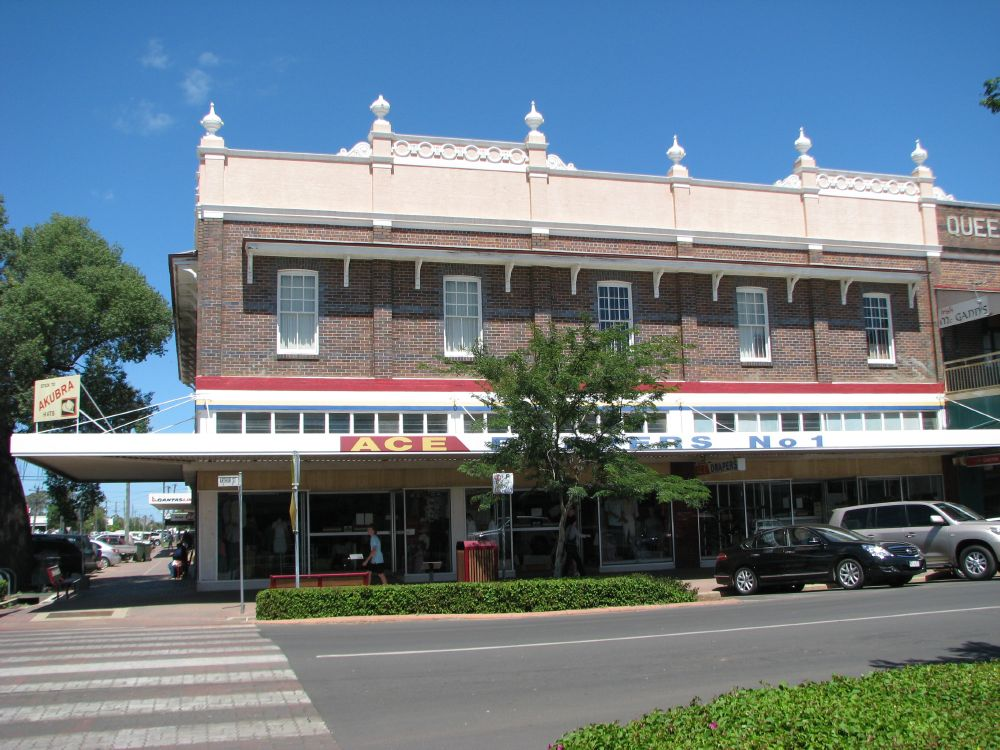
- Hunter's Emporium, 2010

- Location within Queensland Location within Australia
- 26.572°S 148.7893°E
- Location: 86 McDowell Street, Roma, Maranoa Region, Queensland, Australia

History
- Design period: 1914–1919 (World War I)
- Built: 1916
- Built for: John McEwan Hunter

Site notes
- Architect: John Hill

Queensland Heritage Register
- Official name: Hunter's Emporium (former)
- Type: state heritage (built)
- Designated: 30 October 2008
- Reference no.: 601775
- Significant period: 1910s
- Builders: John Hill

Hunter's Emporium is a heritage-listed former department store at 86 McDowell Street, Roma, Maranoa Region, Queensland, Australia. It was designed and built in 1916 by John Hill. It was added to the Queensland Heritage Register on 30 October 2008.

== History ==
The former Hunter's Emporium at Roma, constructed in 1916, is a large, purpose-designed brick department store situated at a principal intersection (the corner of McDowall and Arthur streets) in the commercial heart of the town. It was the head store and signature building in a chain of western Queensland drapery stores established by John McEwan Hunter (1863–1940), businessman and politician, in the late nineteenth century and early twentieth century.

The town of Roma was established in 1862 as a supply and government administrative centre servicing the Maranoa pastoral district. The extension of the Western railway line to Roma and on to Charleville in the 1880s, linking western Queensland to the coastal ports, combined with the tapping of the vast Great Artesian Basin in the late 1880s and early 1890s, stimulated regional development. By the early 1900s Roma was a substantial town serving a wide and prosperous pastoral and agricultural district, the principal economic activities being sheep and cattle grazing, wheat growing, fruit growing, viticulture and wine making.

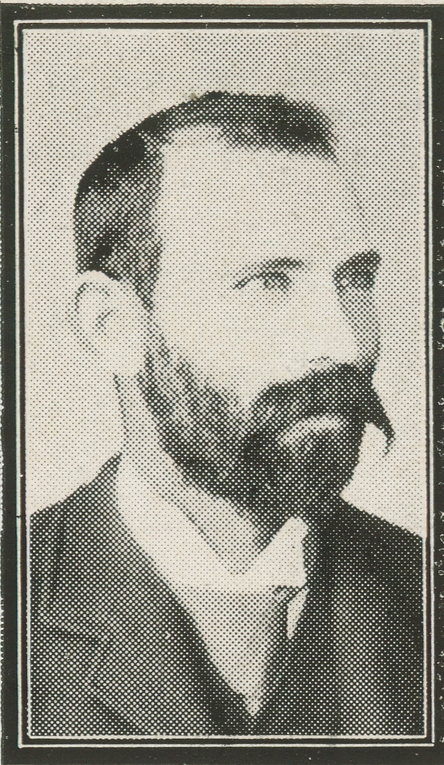
John McEwan Hunter, 1915

In 1889 JM Hunter, a young Scottish immigrant, took up the management of JP McLeish & Co.'s general store and drapery at 88 McDowall Street in Roma, adjacent to the Queen's Arms Hotel at the corner of McDowall and Arthur streets. In the early 1890s he acquired this business in partnership with EJ Harding, trading as Hunter and Harding drapers, grocers and general merchants. In March 1894 Hunter, in partnership with the manager of the Bank of New South Wales in Roma, Alexander Fairlie Whitehill, acquired title to both the store and the adjacent hotel. About this time the firm of Hunter and Harding became Hunter & Co., storekeepers. By 1896 a branch of Hunter & Co. had been opened at Yeulba, where the firm also operated a sawmill and planning establishment. Further branches were opened at Mitchell (c. 1900), Wallumbilla (c. 1906), Jackson (c. 1913), Miles (c. 1925) and Chinchilla (c. 1941). By 1930, the firm had become Hunter's Ltd.

In February 1916 JM Hunter gained sole title to 86 and 88 McDowall Street. A few months later, on 11 April, a fire destroyed Hunter & Co.'s store, O'Malley's tailor shop and the Queen's Arms Hotel. The fire had started in the rear of Hunter and Co.'s store and the entire building and contents (the latter estimated at £12,000) were destroyed.

Hunter rebuilt the general store (1916) and the hotel (1917) as substantial brick structures, but transposed their location, with Hunter & Co.'s new emporium now situated prominently at the corner of McDowall and Arthur streets, and the Queen's Arms Hotel adjacent at 88 McDowall Street.

Roma prospered during the first three decades of the twentieth century, despite the impact of World War I (1914–1918), and many of its buildings were reconstructed in brick at this period. Work on erecting Hunter's new emporium commenced in the first week of August 1916 and was completed in late December that year. It was an imposing, two-storeyed brick building, designed and built by local contractor John Hill. The street facades were "tastefully worked in selected bands of salt glazed bricks, as also around all doors and window openings ... over the first floor windows has been fitted a plastered cornice about 20 inches and a coping mould about 10 inches with the top finished artistically in scrolls and ball finials". The ground floors of both street facades had awnings supported on timber posts, and the McDowall Street elevation featured three island display windows. At the rear of the main structure a single-storeyed rectangular brick building, lit and ventilated by a large roof lantern, accommodated a large show-room and offices, which were accessed from the back of the main shop. A strong room, office and underground cold storage were provided.

Local labour and materials were used wherever possible, and the timber fittings, including shelving and pigeon holes, showcases and glass-topped counters, were crafted by Roma cabinet maker and furniture manufacturer John Crawford. The new emporium had electric light, a cash railway and everything needed to make it "a thoroughly modern place of business equal to the largest metropolitan establishments".

The ground floor accommodated the drapery, grocery and ironmongery departments, while the furniture department and bulk store were located on the first floor. Every need of customers from the surrounding district was anticipated, the opening sale advertising "General Drapery, Clothing, Boots and Shoes, Linos, Carpets, Furnishings, Grocery, Crockery, Ironmongery and Produce". As the local press noted, the high capital outlay needed for such an extensive enterprise reflected the proprietors' "unbounded faith in the prospects of the district".

JM Hunter was a prominent businessman in the Maranoa district and was actively involved in the public life of his community and in Queensland politics. He served as an Alderman on the Roma Town Council in 1898 and 1899 and as Mayor of Roma in 1900. He was instrumental in establishing the Roma Co-operative Milling Co. Ltd, which in 1900 constructed the Roma Co-operative Flour Mill and produced Excelsior brand flour until acquired by the Dominion Flour Milling Co. in 1914. He was a President of the Western Queensland Pastoral and Agricultural Association, which held its annual show at Roma. He was closely associated with the formation of the Queensland Traders' Association, a leading wholesale trading co-operative with headquarters in Brisbane, of which he was chairman from its inception.

In May 1907 JM Hunter was elected Member of the Queensland Legislative Assembly for Maranoa, retaining this seat until 22 October 1919. Affiliated with the Australian Labor Party, he held the position of Secretary for Public Lands in the T. J. Ryan government from 1 June 1915 to 30 April 1918, and then as Minister without office until his appointment in October 1919 as the Queensland Agent-General in London, serving in this position until 1922.

JM Hunter had married Ellen Guthrie Moffat in 1890. They had one daughter, Helen Roma Jean, born in 1897. In 1927 Roma Hunter married Vincent Lancelot Victor Bressow in Brisbane. After her father's death in 1940 she and her husband took control of Hunter's Ltd, which remained one of western Queensland's principal retail firms well into the second half of the twentieth century.

When the Warrego Highway was sealed in the 1950s the smaller branches (Wallumbilla, Yeulba, Jackson and Chinchilla) became unviable, and were either sold or closed. The Roma store was sold in 1977 to the Anderson family trading as Ace Drapers; the Miles branch was sold in 1984; and the Mitchell branch, managed by Bill McMullen for nearly 30 years, in 2004.

In early 2008 Ace Drapers closed the former Hunter's Emporium at 86 McDowall Street, Roma.

== Description ==
The former Hunter's Emporium comprises a two-storeyed brick building with facades to McDowall and Arthur streets, and an attached single-storeyed brick building, fronting Arthur Street, at the rear. A painted and rendered parapet embellished with moulded scrollwork and crowned with ball finials screens two side skillion roofs and a central hipped roof which shelter the two-storey building.

The external walls to McDowall and Arthur streets are of red face-brick worked with darker bands of brick which also form the decorative quoining defining the door and window openings. These bands and decorative surrounds are painted white on parts of the Arthur Street elevation. A cantilevered awning surmounted by a row of glass louvres runs along McDowall Street and extends around the corner into Arthur Street. The form of the three street-level island display windows in the McDowall Street elevation remains, but the glazing is not original. The street-level shop windows along Arthur Street are modern.

A narrow timber awning supported by decorative timber brackets shades the first floor windows to each street elevation. The soffits are lined with decorative pressed metal.

The small rectangular building at the rear (former office and show room), is entered from the back of the shop. It has a hipped roof surmounted by a large roof lantern. The rear loading platform is enclosed with corrugated galvanized iron. The loading area is accessed from the narrow rear service lane.

The interior of the ground floor of the store retains fluted timber columns with corbels supporting the beams running the length of the space. The ceiling is lined with decorative pressed metal and the walls are finished in painted plaster.

The main staircase to the upper floor is accommodated in the south-east corner and is fitted with square-moulded balusters with a moulded oak handrail. A plainer staircase occupies the south-west corner.

The purpose-designed silky oak showcases, other purpose-made shop joinery, and the cash railway system, have been removed from the ground floor.

== Heritage listing ==
The former Hunter's Emporium was listed on the Queensland Heritage Register on 30 October 2008 having satisfied the following criteria.

The place is important in demonstrating the evolution or pattern of Queensland's history.

Hunter's Emporium, a two-storeyed brick department store constructed in 1916 for Roma businessman and MLA for Maranoa, John McEwan Hunter, is important in demonstrating the consolidation of Roma as a major regional centre during the first three decades of the twentieth century, when many of the principal buildings in the town were being rebuilt in brick, and provides evidence of the quality of design and manufacturing skills available in Roma at this period.

As the headquarters and signature building for a chain of western Queensland drapery and general stores established by Hunter and Co. (later Hunter's Ltd) in the late nineteenth century and early twentieth century, the building is important in illustrating the provision and expansion of general retailing in regional Queensland, in particular reflecting the growth of western Queensland at this period.

The place demonstrates rare, uncommon or endangered aspects of Queensland's cultural heritage.

The place remains substantially intact and is significant as a rare surviving, early twentieth century masonry department store in a Queensland regional centre, one of a small group of similar establishments which includes: the former Daking-Smith & Co. Department Store (c. 1909, Pollard's Store) in Charters Towers; the former Boland's Department Store (1912 with 1930s extensions, Bolands Centre) in Cairns; and the former Piggot's Department Store (1909–10 with later additions, Pigott's Building) in Toowoomba.

The place is important in demonstrating the principal characteristics of a particular class of cultural places.

In its size and intactness the place is important in demonstrating the principal characteristics of a large regional department store of the early twentieth century, designed to impress. These characteristics include: the prominent location at the corner of two main streets in the heart of a principal regional centre; the substantial nature of the two-storeyed, brick structure; the decorative parapet and other detailing to the street elevations; the extensive use of pressed metal throughout the public areas of the store; the provision of natural lighting via the fenestration in the main elevations and a roof lantern to the rear store; and the store and loading dock facility at the rear of the premises.

The place is important because of its aesthetic significance.

Prominently situated on a corner allotment in the principal street of Roma's central business district, the building is significant for the contribution of its form, scale and detail to the historical character of this area and to the Roma townscape.

The place has a special association with the life or work of a particular person, group or organisation of importance in Queensland's history.

Hunter's Emporium has a special association with the life and work of John McEwan Hunter, a self-made and successful Roma businessman, local and state politician, and former Agent-General for Queensland. From the mid-1890s Hunter & Co. (later Hunter's Ltd) developed a chain of general and drapery stores in south-west Queensland. The substantial edifice that JM Hunter erected in Roma in 1916 as Hunter's Emporium was the head office and signature building of this chain.
