= Shire of Bungil =

- Local government area
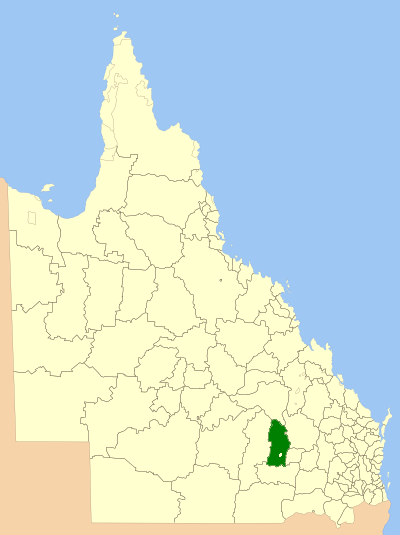
- Location within Queensland

- Country: Australia
- State: Queensland
- Region: Maranoa
- Established: 1880
- Abolished: 2008
- Council seat: Roma

Area
  - Total: 13,338 km^{2} (5,150 sq mi)

Population
  - Total: 2,051 (2006 census)
  - Density: 0.15377/km^{2} (0.39827/sq mi)
- Website: Shire of Bungil
LGAs around Shire of Bungil
Booringa	Bauhinia	Taroom
Booringa	Shire of Bungil	Bendemere
Warroo	Warroo	Warroo

The Shire of Bungil was a local government area in the Maranoa region of Queensland, Australia. It existed from 1880 to 2008.

The shire surrounded the town of Roma, which had its own local government. Roma was also the location of the administration of Bungil Shire. Today it is part of the Maranoa Region.

== History ==
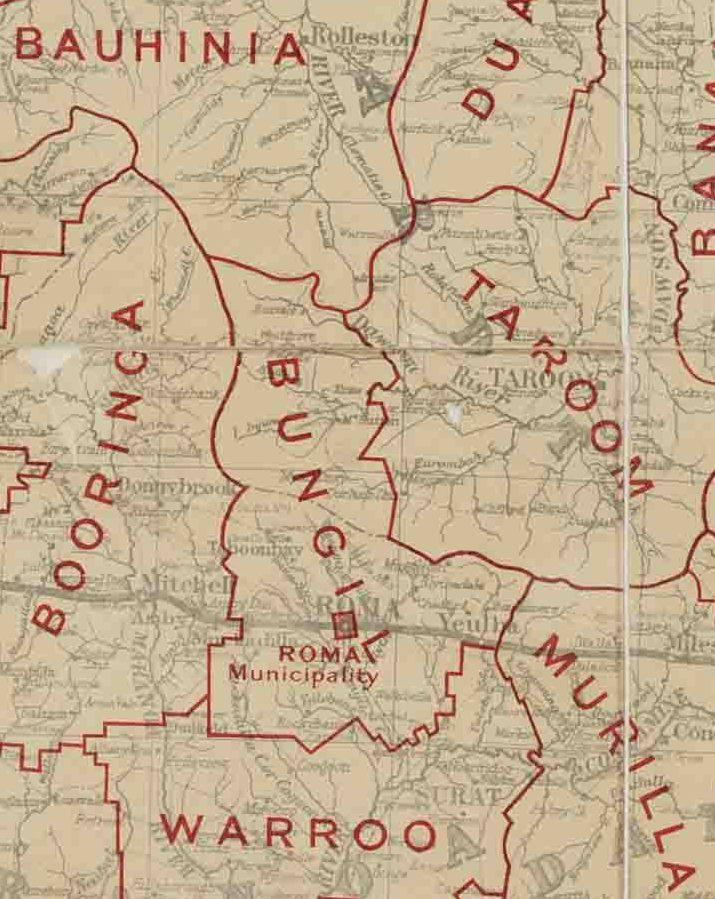
Map of Bungil Division and adjacent local government areas, March 1902

Wallumbilla Division (later renamed Booringa Division) was established on 11 November 1879 as one of the original divisions proclaimed under the Divisional Boards Act 1879 with a population of 3217.

On 21 May 1880, part of Wallumbilla Division was separated to create Bungil Division.

On 31 March 1903, Bungil Division became Shire of Bungil under the "Local Authorities Act 1902".

In July 2007, the Local Government Reform Commission released a report recommending a number of amalgamations of local government areas in Queensland. As a result, under the Local Government (Reform Implementation) Act 2007, on 15 March 2008, the new local government area of Roma Region was created, as an amalgamation of five previous local government areas:

- the Town of Roma;
- the Shire of Bendemere;
- the Shire of Booringa;
- the Shire of Bungil;
- and the Shire of Warroo.

On 26 July 2009, Roma Region was renamed Maranoa Region.

The Bungil Shire Council's offices at 1 Cartwright Street, Roma (26.58383°S 148.77675°E) are now used as a depot by the Maranoa Regional Council.

== Towns and localities ==
The Shire of Bungil included the following settlements:

- Injune
- Muckadilla

The Great Dividing Range passes through the shire.

== Chairmen and mayors ==
- 1895: James Lalor, also Member of the Queensland Legislative Assembly and Queensland Legislative Council
- 1918: P. Hoskin
- 1927: John Samuel Murphy
- 1967—1975: Ken Tomkins, also Member of the Queensland Legislative Assembly in Roma
- 2000 – 2008: Robert ("Scruff") Loughnan (subsequently mayor of Maranoa Regional Council)
