= Shire of Bendemere =

Coordinates: 26°37′S 149°23′E

- Local government area
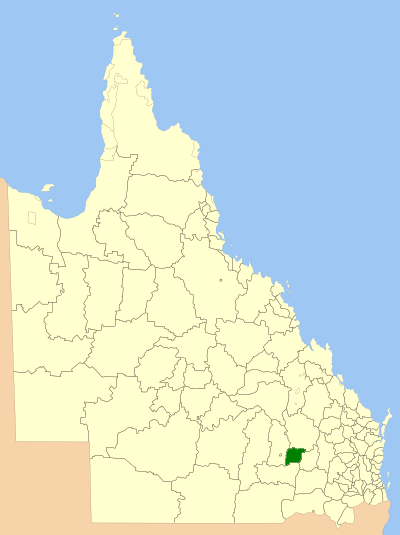
- Location within Queensland

- Country: Australia
- State: Queensland
- Established: 1911
- Council seat: Yuleba

Area
  - Total: 3,926.8 km^{2} (1,516.1 sq mi)

Population
  - Total: 985 (2006 census)
  - Density: 0.25084/km^{2} (0.6497/sq mi)
LGAs around Shire of Bendemere
Bungil	Taroom	Taroom
Bungil	Shire of Bendemere	Murilla
Warroo	Warroo	Murilla

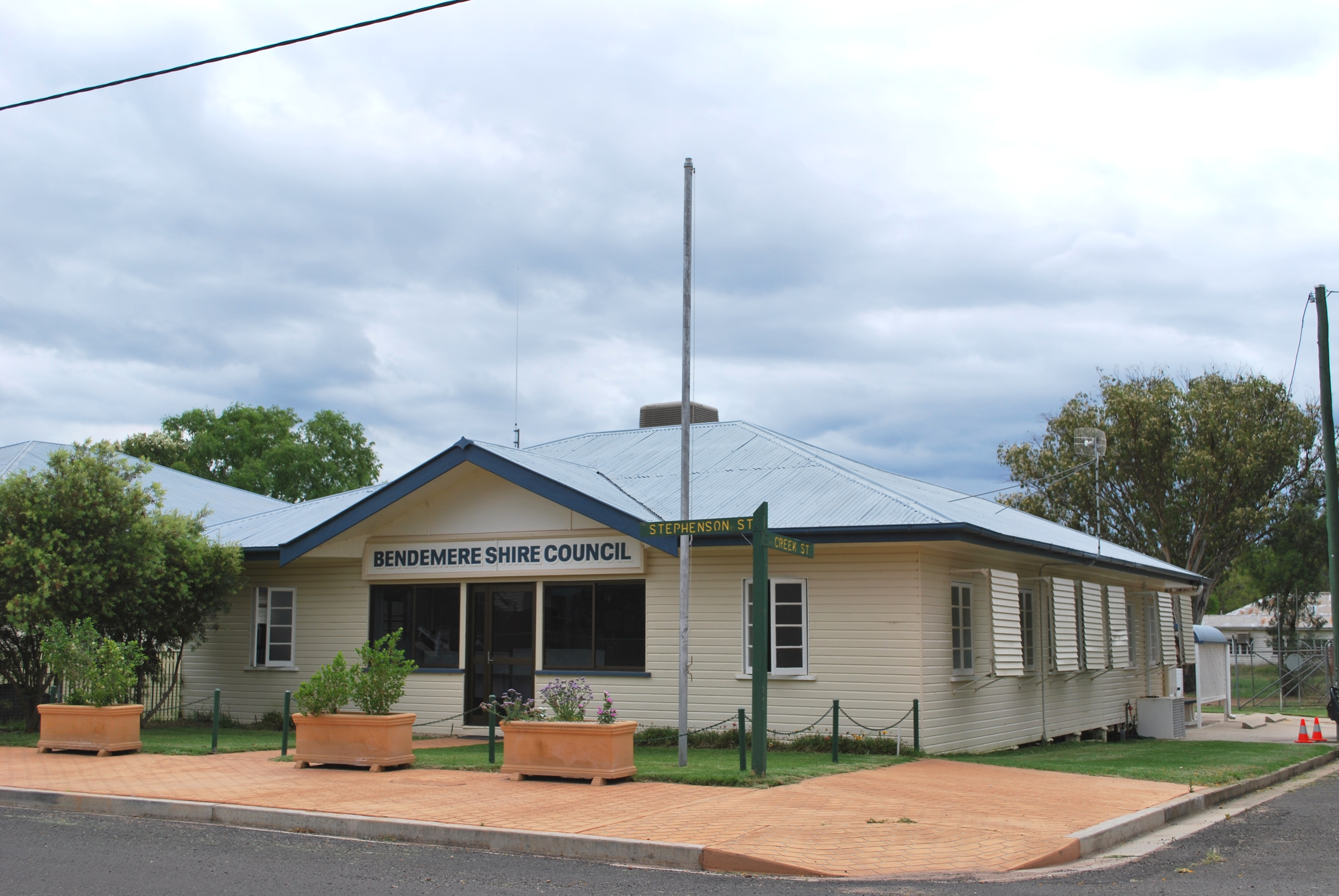
Shire office in Yuleba

The Shire of Bendemere was a local government area in the Maranoa region of Queensland, Australia, and existed from 1911 until 2008 when it amalgamated into Maranoa Region. The Shire, administered from the town of Yuleba, covered an area of 3,926.8 square kilometres (1,516.1 sq mi), and existed as a local government entity from 1911 until 2008, when it was amalgamated with the Town of Roma and the Shires of Booringa, Bungil and Warroo to form the Maranoa Region.

== History ==
The Shire of Bendemere was established on 12 January 1911 from portions of the Shires of Bungil, Murilla and Warroo.

In July 2007, the Local Government Reform Commission released a report recommending a number of amalgamations of local government areas in Queensland. As a result, under the Local Government (Reform Implementation) Act 2007, on 15 March 2008, the new local government area of Roma Region was created, as an amalgamation of five previous local government areas:

- the Town of Roma;
- the Shire of Bendemere;
- the Shire of Booringa;
- the Shire of Bungil;
- and the Shire of Warroo.

On 26 July 2009, Roma Region was renamed Maranoa Region.

== Towns and localities ==
The Shire of Bendemere included the following settlements:

- Yuleba
- Jackson
- Wallumbilla

== Economy ==
The economy of the shire is mostly based around agriculture, including cattle, sheep and grain. Natural gas also plays a part, with gas wells being found throughout the shire and a liquified petroleum gas processing plant located just south of Wallumbilla.

== Chairmen ==
- 1911: Thomas Latin Nugent Fitzgerald
- 1927: J. Stower
