= James Lalor =

Australian politician (1829–1922)

The Hon James Lalor
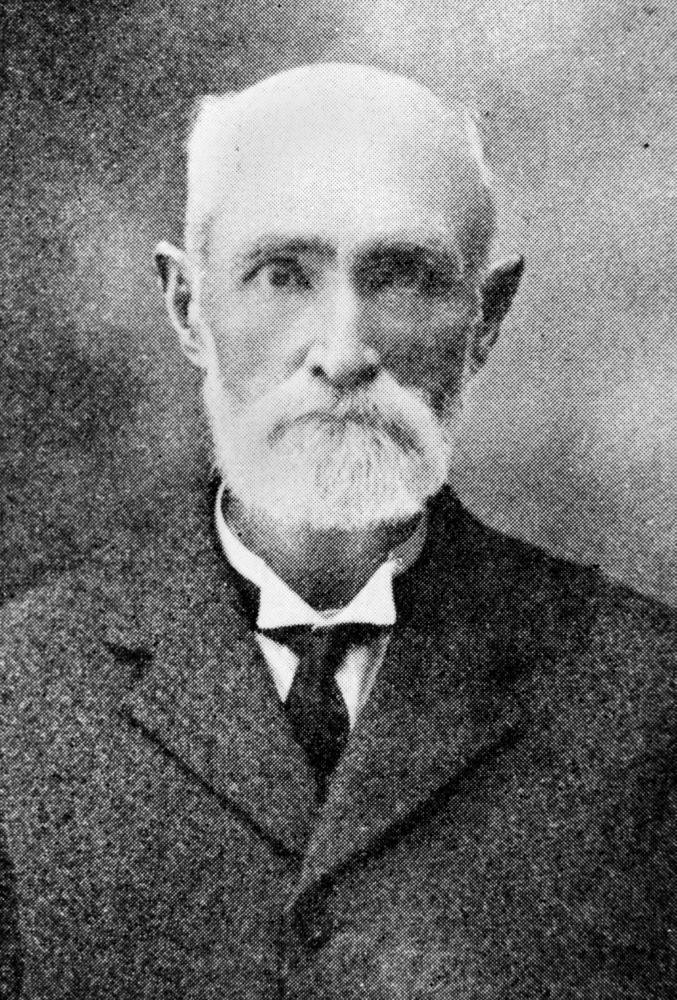

Member of the Queensland Legislative Assembly for Maranoa
- In office 5 December 1878 – 12 May 1888
- Preceded by: Thomas McIlwraith
- Succeeded by: Robert Dunsmure

Member of the Queensland Legislative Council
- In office 23 August 1888 – 11 August 1921

Personal details
- Born: James Lalor; 7 July 1829 Ballybrittas, Queen's County Ireland
- Died: 16 February 1922 (aged 92) Roma, Queensland, Australia
- Resting place: Roma General Cemetery
- Spouse: Helen Gorry
- Occupation: Squatter

James Lalor (1829–1922) was a politician in Queensland, Australia. He was a Member of the Queensland Legislative Assembly and a Member of the Queensland Legislative Council.

== Early life ==
James Lalor was born on 7 July 1829 in Ballybrittas, Queen's County, Ireland, the son of William Lalor and his wife Eliza (née Connor).

Aged 11 years, James Lalor immigrated with his parents to New South Wales where the family lived in Maitland and Carroll before taking up the Bengalla pastoral station on the Severn River near Goondiwindi in 1852. He worked with his family on Bengalla station, until 1860, when he established a pastoral station Gubberamunda (an Aboriginal word meaning little hills) with his brother in the Bungil Creek area. Initially they ran sheep on the Gubberamunda, but later switched to cattle as they did better on the available grass.

== Politics ==
James Lalor was a friend and admirer of Thomas McIlwraith, who persuaded Lalor to stand for election to the Queensland Parliament.

On 5 December 1878 at the 1878 colonial election, James Lalor was elected to the Queensland Legislative Assembly in the electoral district of Maranoa. In the 1883 election, he successfully retained the seat against opponent Herbert Hunter. He held the seat until 12 May 1888, when he chose not to contest the 1888 election.

On 23 August 1888, Lalor was appointed a lifetime Member of the Queensland Legislative Council. However, he resigned from the Council on 11 August 1921 due to failing health at the age of 92.

Lalor served as a councillor on the Bungil Divisional Board for many years and served as chairman in 1895. He also served as alderman in the Roma Town Council.

== Later life ==
Lalor died on 16 February 1922 at his residence Mollin, Roma, at the age of 92. Being a Roman Catholic, his funeral took place in the Sacred Heart Church in Roma on 18 February 1922. He was buried in Roma General Cemetery with his wife Helen whom he had married in 1869.

== See also ==
- Members of the Queensland Legislative Assembly, 1878–1883; 1883–1888
- Members of the Queensland Legislative Council, 1880–1889; 1890–1899; 1900–1909; 1910–1916; 1917–1922

Parliament of Queensland
Preceded by Thomas McIlwraith	Member for Maranoa; 1878–1888	Succeeded by Robert Dunsmure
