= Robert King (Queensland politician) =

Australian politician

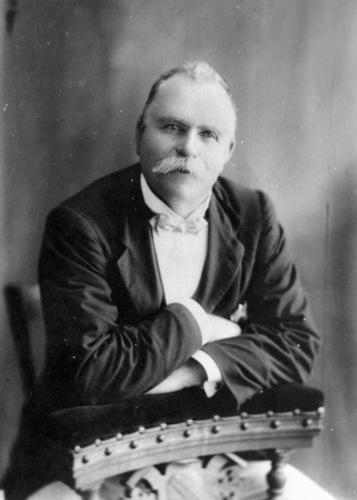

Member of the Queensland Legislative Assembly for Maranoa
- In office 13 May 1893 – 18 March 1899
- Preceded by: Robert Dunsmure
- Succeeded by: Arthur Rutledge

Personal details
- Born: Robert King; 1848 County Antrim, Ireland
- Died: 20 February 1905 (aged 56) Roma, Queensland, Australia
- Resting place: South Brisbane Cemetery
- Party: Labour
- Spouse: Jane Ann Lanaler (died 1947)
- Occupation: Hotelier

Robert King (1848 - 20 February 1905) was a member of the Queensland Legislative Assembly.

== Biography ==
King was born in County Antrim, Ireland, the son of Charles King and his wife Mary (née McCuray). He received his education in Ireland and after arriving in Australia acquired the Court House Hotel in Roma in 1884. He worked in Brisbane from 1895 but in 1904 returned to Roma to become the licensee of the Court House Hotel again.

He married Jane Ann Lanaler (died 1947) in Tamworth and together had 3 sons and four daughters. He died at Roma in February 1905 and was buried in the South Brisbane Cemetery.

== Public career ==
Kennedy was the Labour member for Maranoa in the Queensland Legislative Assembly from 1893 until 1899.

Parliament of Queensland
Preceded by Robert Dunsmure	Member for Maranoa; 1893–1899	Succeeded by Arthur Rutledge
