= Shire of Warroo =

Coordinates: 27°09′15″S 149°04′04″E

- Local government area
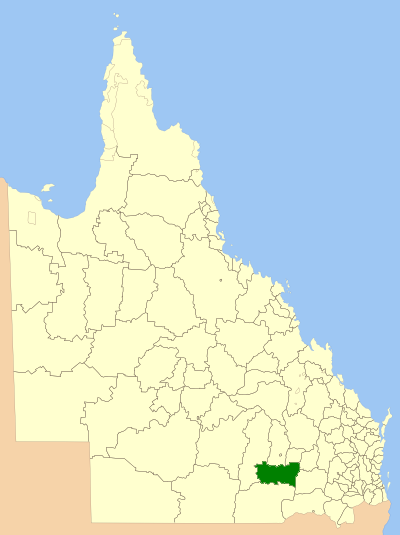
- Location within Queensland

- Country: Australia
- State: Queensland
- Region: Darling Downs
- Council seat: Surat

Area
  - Total: 13,660 km^{2} (5,270 sq mi)

Population
  - Total: 1,038 (2006 census)
  - Density: 0.07599/km^{2} (0.19681/sq mi)
- Website: Shire of Warroo
LGAs around Shire of Warroo
Booringa	Bungil	Bendemere, Murilla
Booringa	Shire of Warroo	Tara
Balonne	Balonne	Tara

The Shire of Warroo was a local government area in the Darling Downs region of Queensland, Australia. In March 2008, it became part of the new Maranoa Region.

The administrative centre and only major town in the shire was Surat. The Shire was established on 11 November 1879.

== History ==
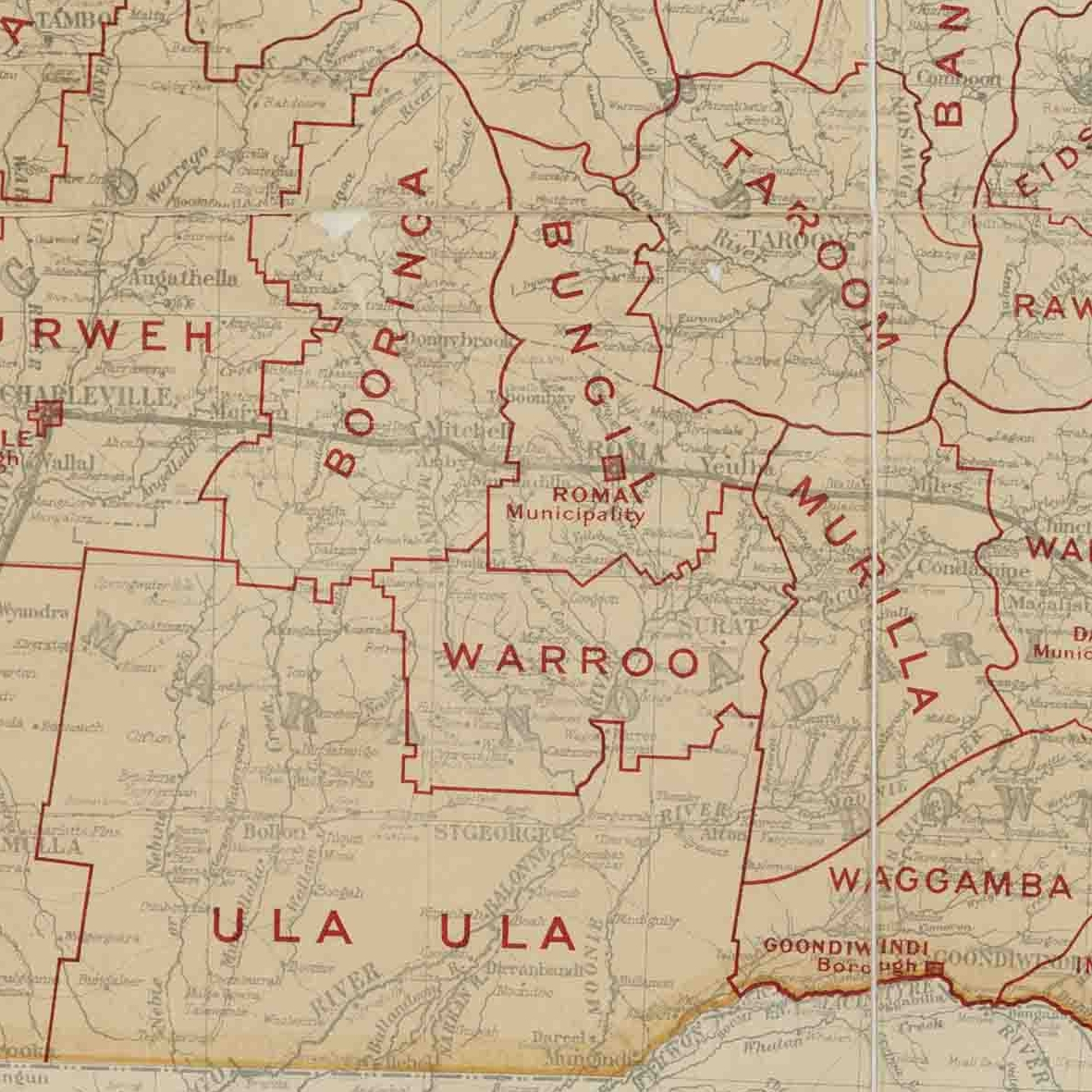
Map of Warroo Division and adjacent local government areas, March 1902

Warroo Division was established on 11 November 1879 as one of the original divisions proclaimed under the Divisional Boards Act 1879 with a population of 845.

With the passage of the Local Authorities Act 1902, Warroo Division became the Shire of Warroo on 31 March 1903.

In July 2007, the Local Government Reform Commission released a report recommending a number of amalgamations of local government areas in Queensland. As a result, under the Local Government (Reform Implementation) Act 2007, on 15 March 2008, the new local government area of Roma Region was created, as an amalgamation of five previous local government areas:

- the Town of Roma;
- the Shire of Bendemere;
- the Shire of Booringa;
- the Shire of Bungil;
- and the Shire of Warroo.

On 26 July 2009, Roma Region was renamed Maranoa Region.

== Towns and localities ==
The Shire of Warroo included the following settlement:

- Surat

== Shire chambers ==
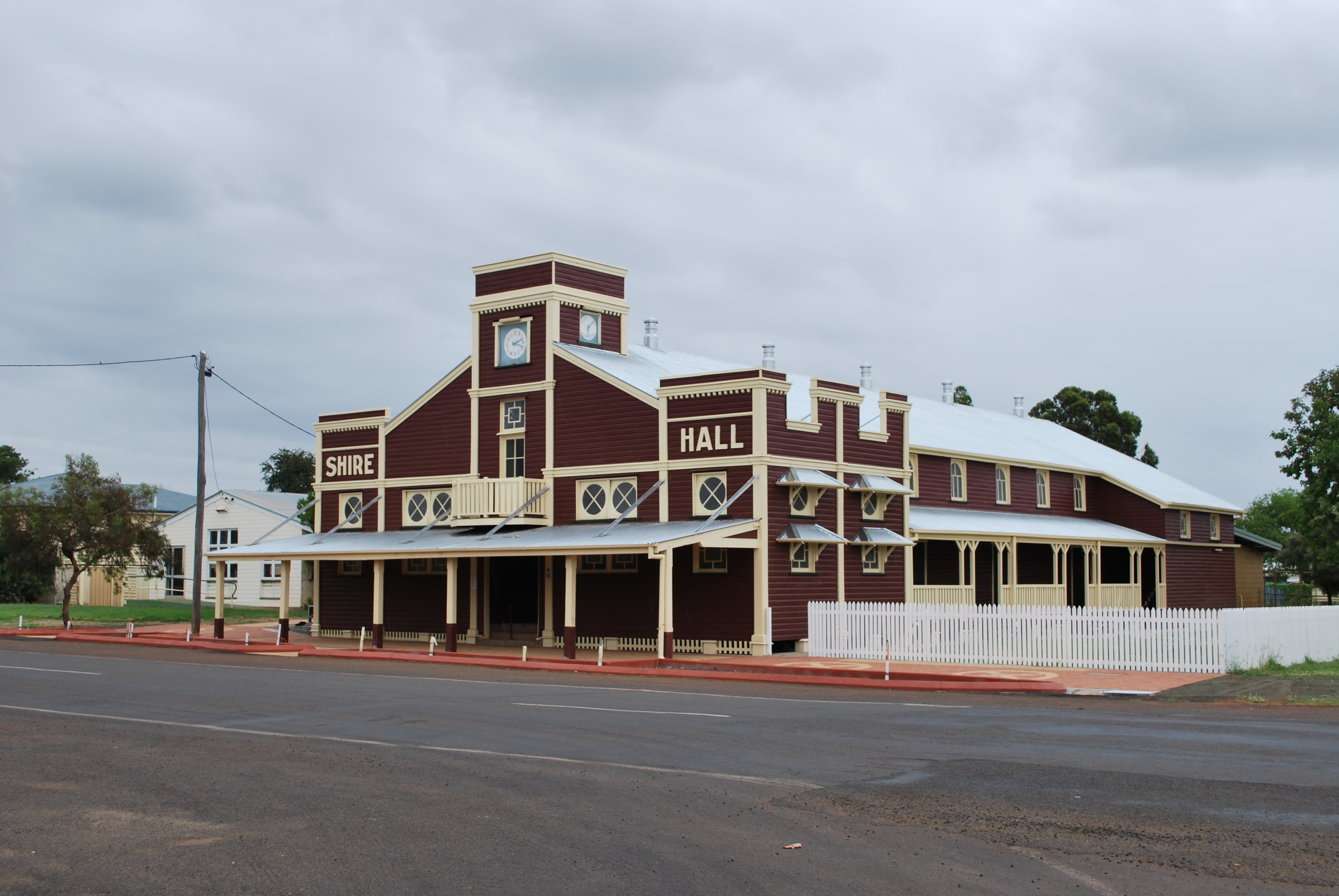
Shire hall

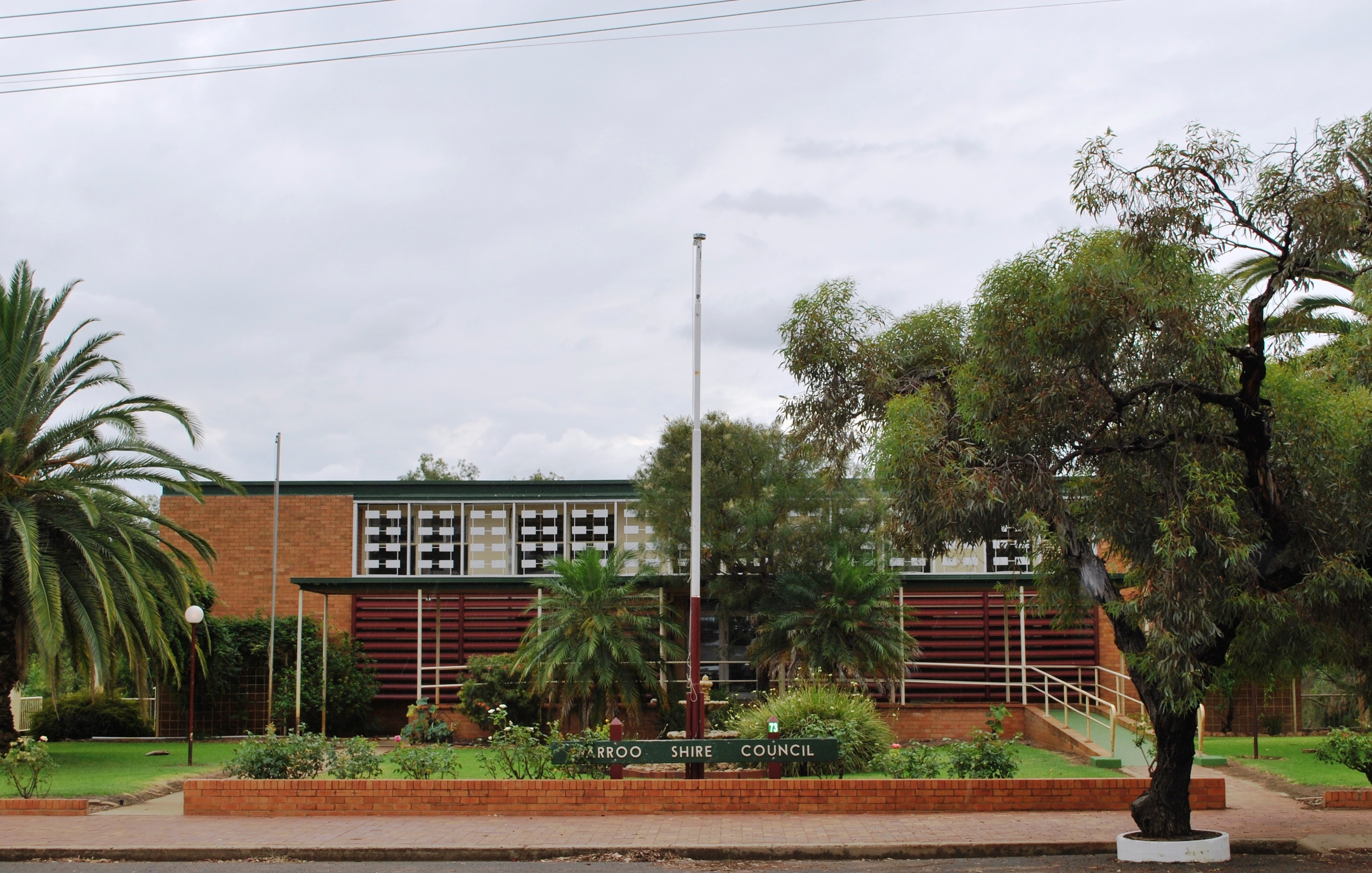
Shire council offices

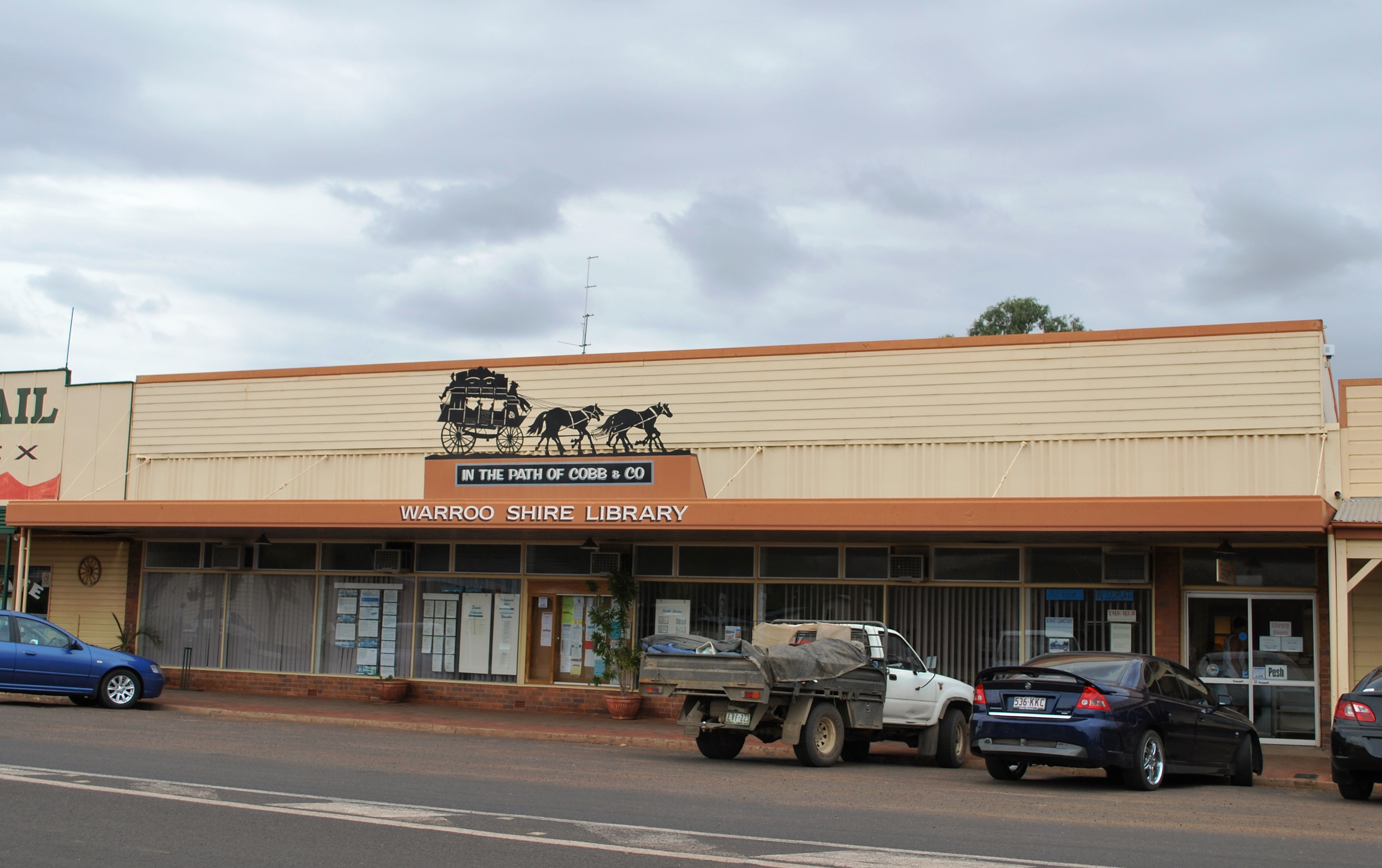
Shire library

The shire had council offices, a shire hall and library, all located in Surat.

== Chairmen ==
- 1927: Francis Richmond Rouse
