= Shire of Booringa =

Coordinates: 24°06′54″S 148°05′18.5″E

- Local government area
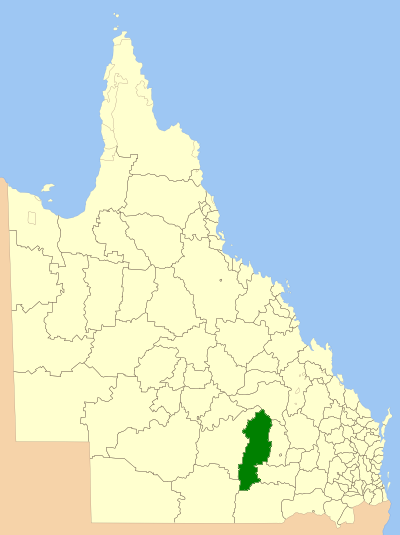
- Location within Queensland

- Country: Australia
- State: Queensland
- Region: Maranoa
- Council seat: Mitchell

Area
  - Total: 27,793 km^{2} (10,731 sq mi)

Population
  - Total: 1,706 (2006)
  - Density: 0.061382/km^{2} (0.15898/sq mi)
- Website: Shire of Booringa
LGAs around Shire of Booringa
Murweh	Bauhinia	Bauhinia
Murweh	Shire of Booringa	Bungil
Paroo	Balonne	Warroo

The Shire of Booringa was a local government area in the Maranoa region of Queensland, Australia. The largest town and home of the shire administration was Mitchell. It existed from 1879 to 2008. The shire is now part of the Maranoa Region.

== History ==
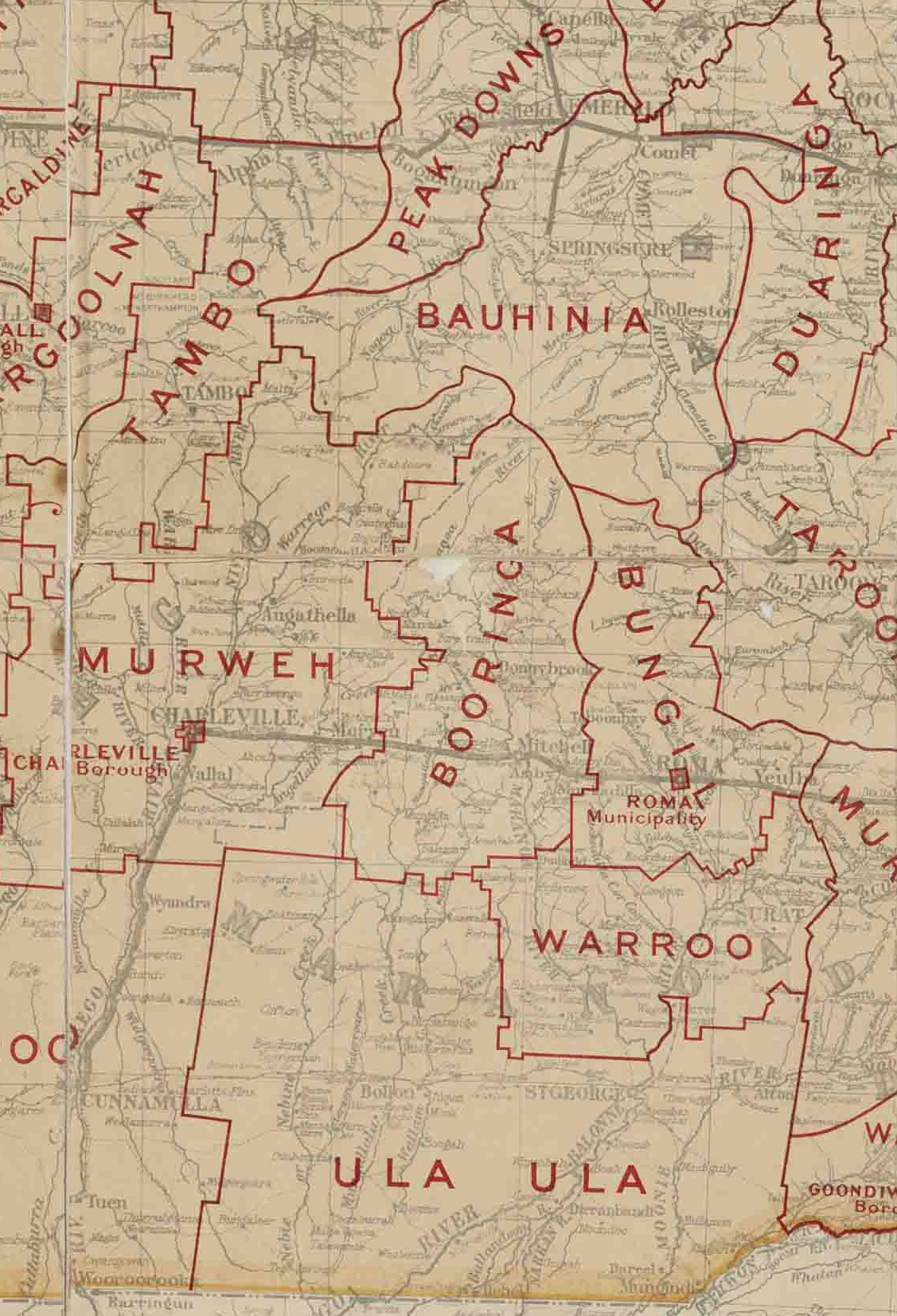
Map of Booringa Division and adjacent local government areas, March 1902

Wallumbilla Division was established on 11 November 1879 as one of the original divisions proclaimed under the Divisional Boards Act 1879 with a population of 3217.

On 21 May 1880, part of Wallumbilla Division was separated to create Bungil Division.

Wallumbilla Division was renamed Booringa Division on 18 July 1891. The name Booringa is the Aboriginal name for the country around Mitchell.

With the passage of the Local Authorities Act 1902, Booringa Division became the Shire of Booringa on 31 March 1903.

In July 2007, the Local Government Reform Commission released a report recommending a number of amalgamations of local government areas in Queensland. As a result, under the Local Government (Reform Implementation) Act 2007, on 15 March 2008, the new local government area of Roma Region was created, as an amalgamation of five previous local government areas:

- the Town of Roma;
- the Shire of Bendemere;
- the Shire of Booringa;
- the Shire of Bungil;
- and the Shire of Warroo.

On 26 July 2009, Roma Region was renamed Maranoa Region.

== Towns and localities ==
The Shire of Booringa included the following settlements:

- Amby
- Mitchell
- Mungallala

== Chairmen and mayor ==
- 1892–1894: William Gordon Burton-Bradley
- 1927: William James Sullivan
- 1931: John William Fletcher
- 1985–2008: Warren Wilson
