= Isidor Lissner =

Australian politician (1832–1902)

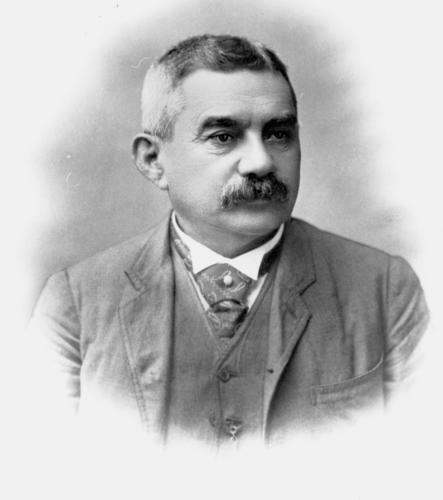

Member of the Queensland Legislative Assembly for Kennedy
- In office 25 November 1873 – 28 November 1878 Serving with Arthur Rutledge
- Preceded by: Henry Palmer
- Succeeded by: George Jackson

Member of the Queensland Legislative Assembly for Cairns
- In office 4 April 1896 – 11 March 1899
- Preceded by: Thomas Joseph Byrnes
- Succeeded by: Thomas Givens

Personal details
- Born: Isidor Siegfried Lissner; 1832 Posen, Prussia
- Died: 22 July 1902 (aged 69–70) Brisbane, Queensland, Australia
- Resting place: Toowong Cemetery
- Party: Ministerialist
- Spouse: Louisa Margaret Ross
- Occupation: Goldminer, Storekeeper

Isidor Siegfried Lissner (1832 – 22 July 1902) was a politician in Queensland, Australia. He was a Member of the Queensland Legislative Assembly.

== Early life ==
Lissner was born in Posen, Prussia, the son of Siegfried Lissner and Julia Gluckmann.

== Mining ==
He emigrated in 1856 to Victoria (Australia), where, after a varied experience on the gold diggings, he went to New Zealand and subsequently to Queensland, where he first settled at Ravenswood, Queensland and then moved to Charters Towers. Lissner came to England with Mr. Black in 1887 as the representative of the Charters Towers miners to assist Harold Finch-Hatton in pressing the question of North Queensland Separation on the attention of the Home Government.

== Politics ==
Lissner was member for Kennedy from 5 October 1883 to 13 May 1893, (Secretary for Mines and Public Works 27 March 1893 to 25 May 1893) and member for Cairns from 4 April 1896 to 11 March 1899.

== Later life ==
Lissner died in 1902 and was buried in Toowong Cemetery.

The heritage-listed Lissner Park in Charters Towers is named after him.

Parliament of Queensland
Preceded by Henry Palmer	Member for Kennedy; 1883 - 1893; Served alongside: Arthur Rutledge	Succeeded by George Jackson
Preceded by Thomas Joseph Byrnes	Member for Cairns; 1896 - 1899	Succeeded by Thomas Givens
