= John Jones (Queensland politician) =

Australian politician

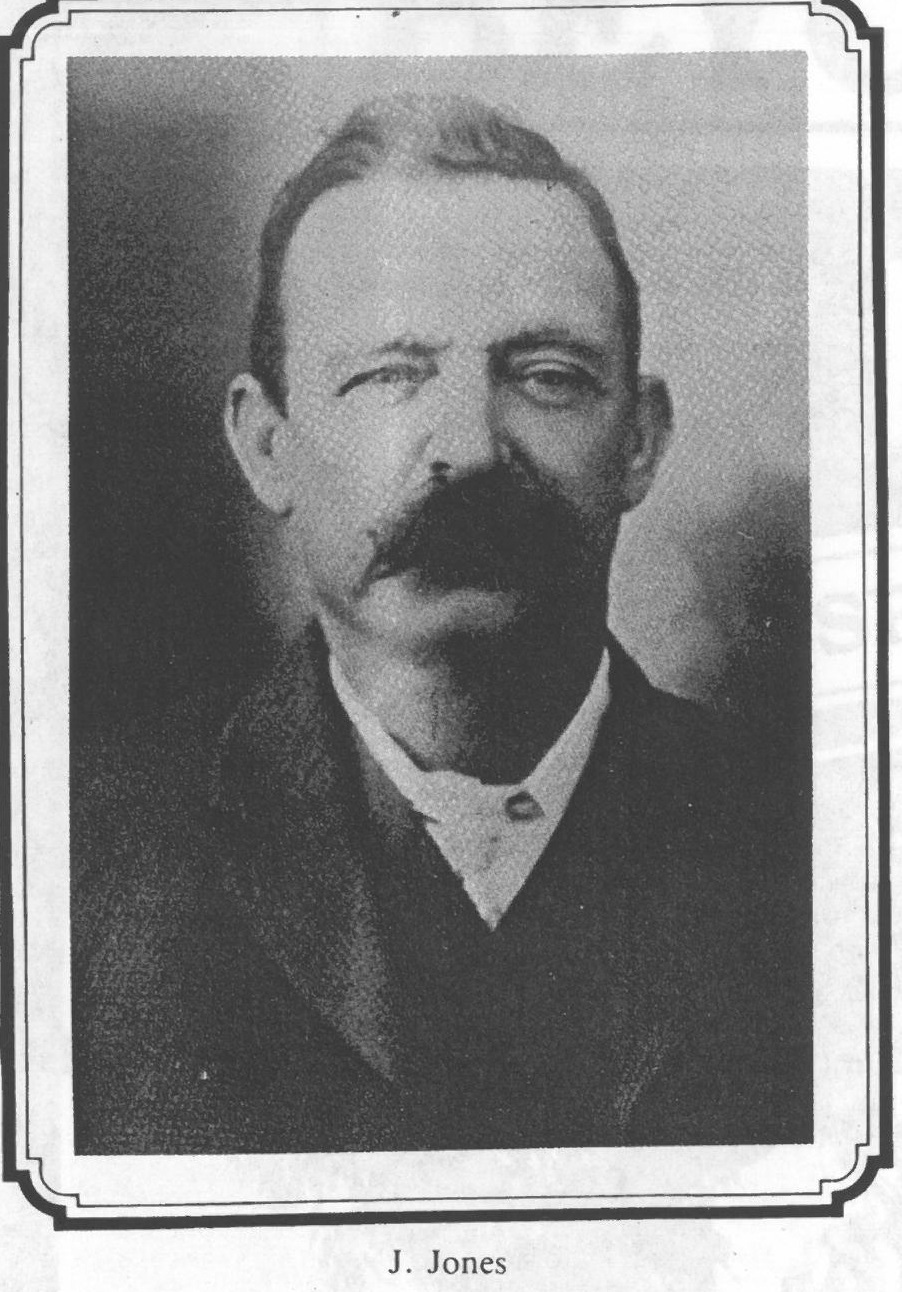

Member of the Queensland Legislative Assembly for Kennedy
- In office 9 October 1920 – 12 May 1923
- Preceded by: James O'Sullivan
- Succeeded by: Harry Bruce

Personal details
- Born: 1872 South Australia
- Died: 1 February 1950 (aged 77–78)
- Party: Northern Country Party
- Occupation: Grazier

John Jones (1872—1950) was a politician in Queensland, Australia. He was a Member of the Queensland Legislative Assembly.

== Politics ==
Jones was a member of the Dalrymple Shire Council from 1905 to 1925 and its chairman from 1919 to 1920.

As a member of the Northern Country Party, Jones contested the 1920 election in the electoral district of Kennedy and was elected on 9 October 1920. He held the seat until the 1923 election on 12 May 1923.

Parliament of Queensland
Preceded by James O'Sullivan	Member for Kennedy; 1920 – 1923	Succeeded by Harry Bruce
