= Henry Wyndham Palmer =

Australian politician

Henry Palmer

Member of the Queensland Legislative Assembly for Kennedy
- In office 28 November 1878 – 5 October 1883 Serving with Francis Stubley
- Preceded by: John Murtagh Macrossan
- Succeeded by: Isidor Lissner

Personal details
- Born: Henry Wyndham Palmer; 1826 Armagh, Ireland
- Died: 10 May 1887 (aged 60 or 61) Charters Towers, Queensland, Australia
- Resting place: Charters Towers Pioneer Cemetery
- Occupation: Miner

Henry Wyndham Palmer (1826 – 10 May 1887) was a member of the Queensland Legislative Assembly.

== Biography ==
Palmer was born in Armagh, Ireland, the son of Arthur Palmer and his wife Emily (née Hunter). His brother, Arthur Hunter Palmer went on to be Premier of Queensland. When he came to Australia he worked the gold mines of Charters Towers and also pastoral pursuits in both Queensland and New South Wales. He was a part owner of the Charters Towers Daily Herald.

Palmer died in 1887 and was buried in the Charters Towers Pioneer Cemetery.

== Public career ==
Palmer held the seat of Kennedy in the Queensland Legislative Assembly from 1878 until 1883. He was also an alderman and the town clerk in Charters Towers.

Parliament of Queensland
Preceded by John Murtagh Macrossan	Member for Kennedy; 1878–1883; Served alongside: Francis Stubley	Succeeded by Isidor Lissner
