= Town of Roma =

Coordinates: 26°34′18″S 148°47′26″E

- Local government area
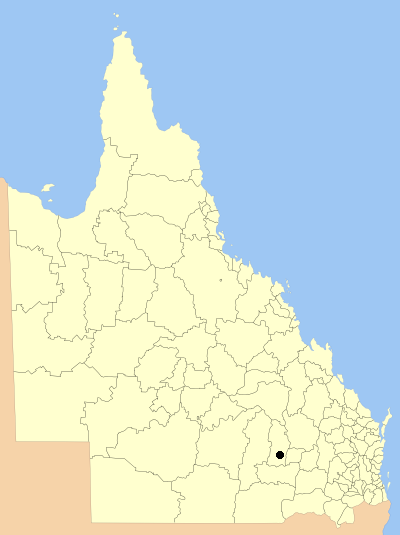
- Location within Queensland

- Country: Australia
- State: Queensland
- Region: Darling Downs
- Established: 1867
- Council seat: Roma

Population
  - Total: 6,906 (2011 census)
- Website: Town of Roma

The Town of Roma was a local government area in the western Downs region of Queensland, Australia. The Town of Roma covered the urban area of Roma and was surrounded by the neighbouring Shire of Bungil. Today it is part of the Maranoa Region. At the 2011 census the Town had a population of 6,906

== History ==
The Borough of Roma was established in 1867.

On 31 March 1903, under the Local Authorities Act (1902), the Borough of Roma became the Town of Roma.

In July 2007, the Local Government Reform Commission released a report recommending a number of amalgamations of local government areas in Queensland. As a result, under the Local Government (Reform Implementation) Act 2007, on 15 March 2008, the new local government area of Roma Region was created, as an amalgamation of five previous local government areas:

- the Town of Roma;
- the Shire of Bendemere;
- the Shire of Booringa;
- the Shire of Bungil;
- and the Shire of Warroo.

On 26 July 2009, Roma Region was renamed Maranoa Region.

== Mayors ==
- 1867: T. McEwen

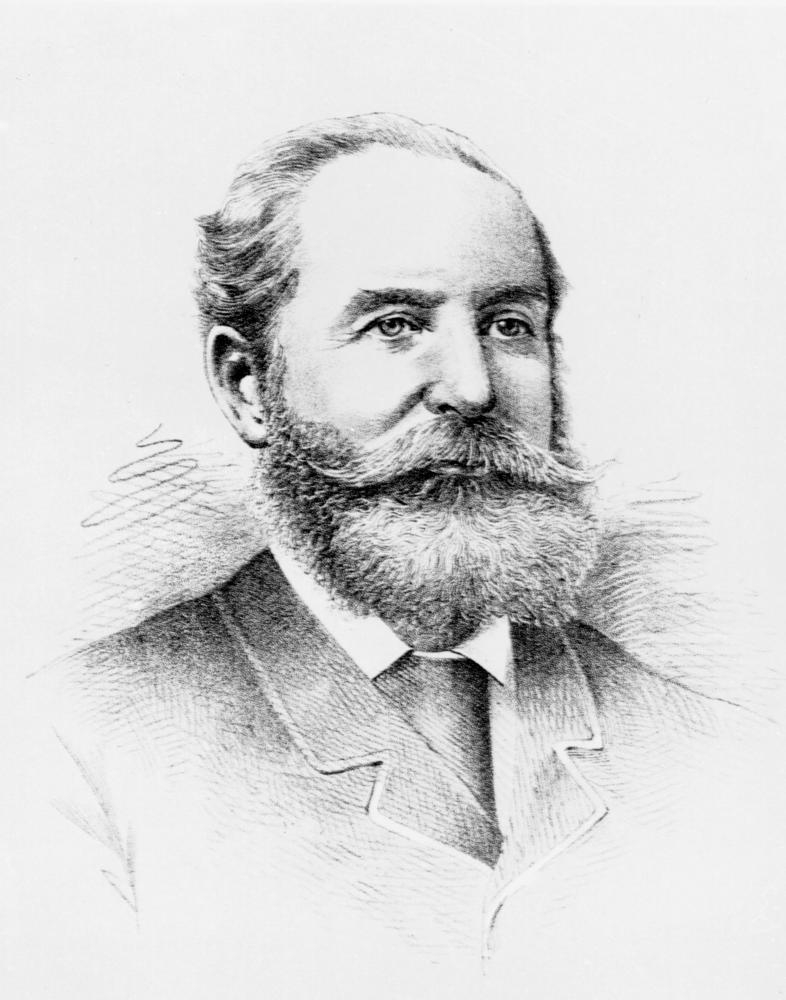
Richard James Cottell, mayor of Roma

- 1902: T.A. Spencer
- 1906: R. Conlan
- James Lalor, also Member of the Queensland Legislative Assembly and the Queensland Legislative Council
- 1927: George Power Williams
- Richard James Cottell (twice)
- 2000–2008: Bruce Garvie
