= George Jackson (Australian politician) =

Australian politician

The Honourable George Jackson
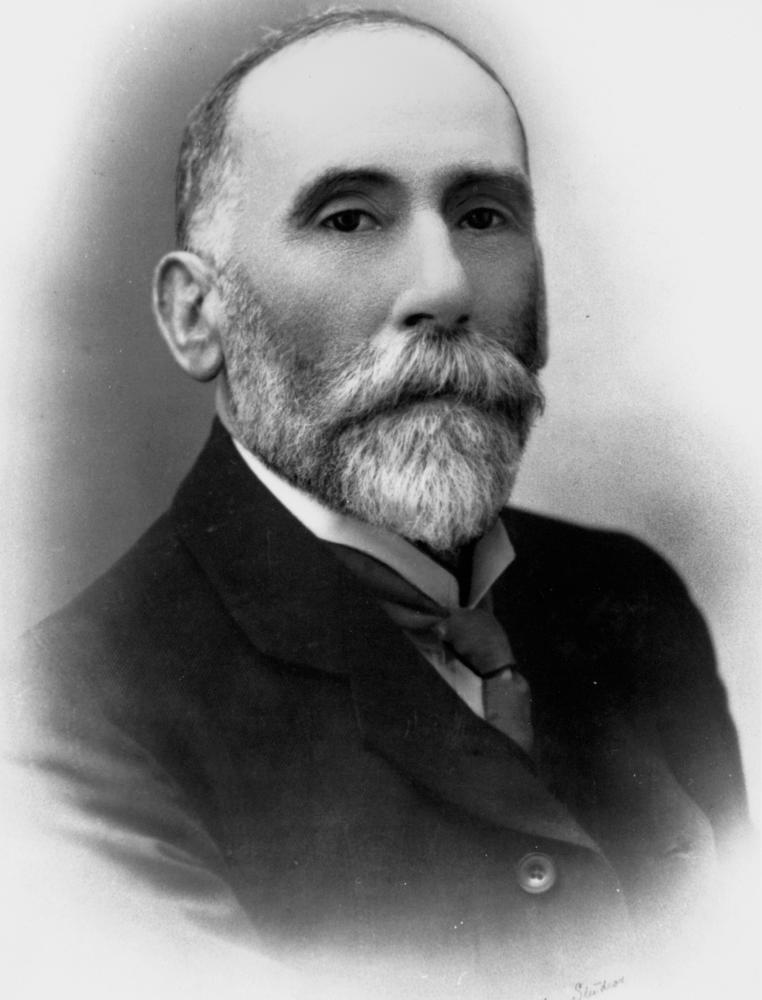
- George Jackson - 1909

Member of the Queensland Legislative Assembly for Kennedy
- In office 13 May 1893 – 2 October 1909
- Preceded by: Isidor Lissner
- Succeeded by: James O'Sullivan

Personal details
- Born: George Jackson; 31 December 1856 Manchester, England
- Died: 12 February 1938 (aged 81) Brisbane, Queensland, Australia
- Resting place: South Brisbane Cemetery
- Party: Ministerialist
- Other political affiliations: Labour Party, Opposition
- Spouse: Mary Hannah Welch (m.1878)
- Occupation: Miner

George Jackson (31 December 1856 – 12 February 1938) was a member of the Queensland Legislative Assembly.

== Biography ==
Jackson was born in Manchester, England, the son of James Jackson and his wife Hannah (née Hilton). He married Mary Hannah Welch at Charters Towers in 1878.

He died in New Farm in February 1938 and was buried in the South Brisbane Cemetery.

== Public career ==
Jackson held the seat of Kennedy in the Queensland Legislative Assembly from 1893 until his defeat in 1909. He was the Chairman of Committees 1903-1907 and the Secretary for Mines and Public Works in 1909.

Parliament of Queensland
Preceded by Isidor Lissner	Member for Kennedy; 1893–1909	Succeeded by James O'Sullivan
