= John McEwan Hunter =

Australian politician

John Hunter
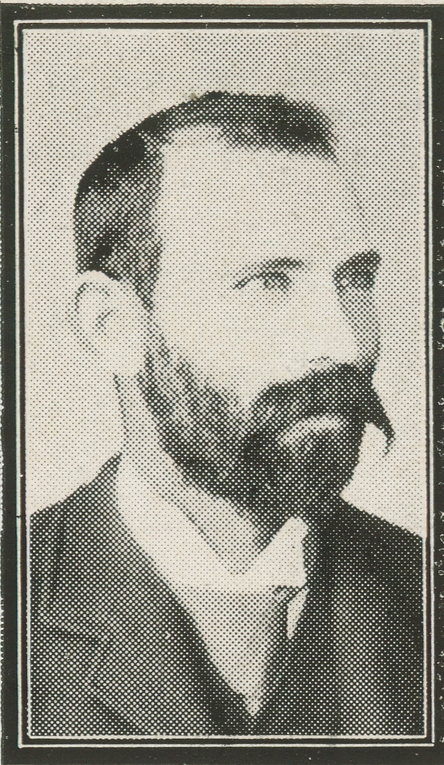
- John McEwan Hunter, Minister for Lands, 1915

Member of the Queensland Legislative Assembly for Maranoa
- In office 18 May 1907 – 22 Oct 1919
- Preceded by: Thomas Spencer
- Succeeded by: Thomas Spencer

Personal details
- Born: John McEwan Hunter; 1863 Moreton Bay, in Queensland waters, Australia
- Died: 18 April 1940 (aged 76–77) Brisbane, Queensland, Australia
- Party: Labor
- Spouse: Ellen Guthrie Moffat (m.1890 d.1947)
- Occupation: Company director

John McEwan Hunter (1863 – 18 April 1940) was a member of the Queensland Legislative Assembly.

== Early life ==
Hunter was born in 1863 in Moreton Bay, off the coast of Queensland as his family was migrating from Scotland to Australia. He was the son of Daniel McEwan Hunter and his wife Jane and was educated at Redbank, Spring Creek and Clifton State Schools. He was for some years manager of a branch business for McLeish and Company in Roma before joining with other members of his family to open a general store in the Maranoa Region. On 2 June 1890 Hunter married Ellen Guthrie Moffat (died 1947) in Toowoomba and together had one daughter.

== Public life ==
Hunter was an alderman in Roma and was the town's mayor in 1900. At the 1907 Queensland state election he won the seat of Maranoa, defeating the sitting Ministerial member, Thomas Spencer. He went on to hold Maranoa until his resignation in 1919 to take up the role of the Queensland Agent-General in England.

During his time in parliament he was the Secretary for Public Lands from 1915 until 1918 and Minister without Office from 1918 until his resignation the next year. He was the chairman of the Queensland Chamber of Agriculture from 1935 to 1940 and chairman of the Investment and Finance Commission.

His interests were business and the affairs of the Presbyterian Church, of which he was a leading member. He was an elder of the Hamilton Presbyterian Church and represented that church in the state assembly. He was also on the church's board of investments and finance. He was a keen bowls player and was a member and official of the Booroodabin bowls club.

== Later life ==
Hunter died at his home in Hamilton, Brisbane, in April 1940 and was accorded a state funeral which proceeded from St Andrew's Presbyterian Church, Brisbane to the Mt Thompson Crematorium.

== Legacy ==
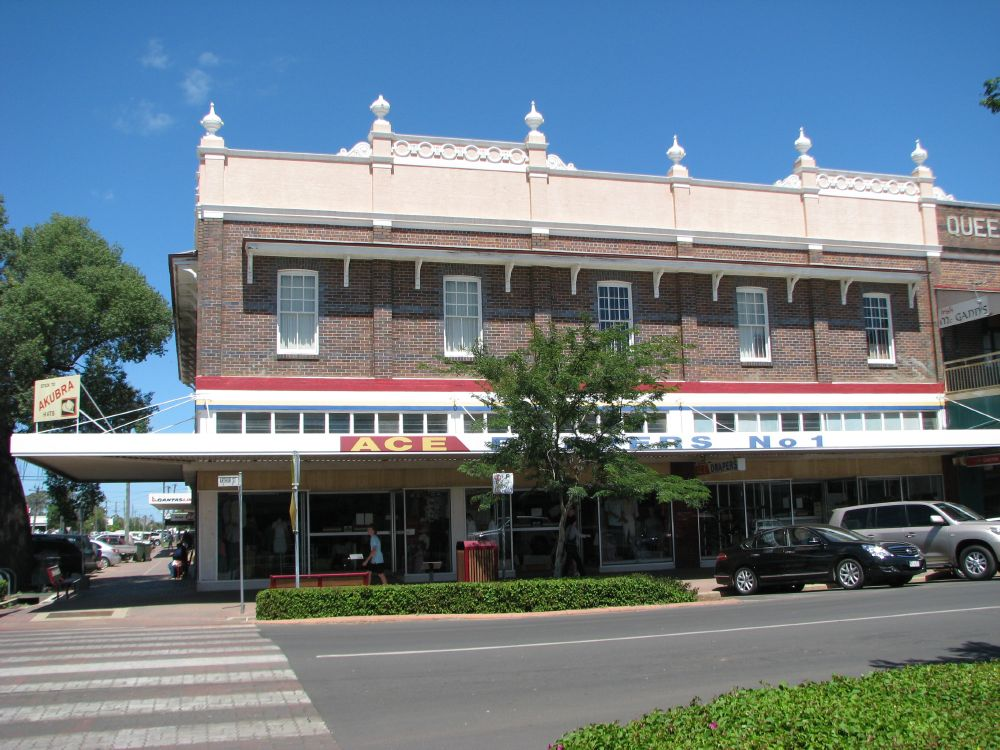
Hunter's Emporium, 2010

His department store in Roma, Hunter's Emporium, was listed on the Queensland Heritage Register in 2008.

== See also ==
- Members of the Queensland Legislative Assembly, 1907–1908; 1908–1909; 1909–1912; 1912–1915; 1915–1918; 1918–1920
