= Harry Bruce (politician) =

Australian politician (1884–1958)

The Honourable Harry Bruce
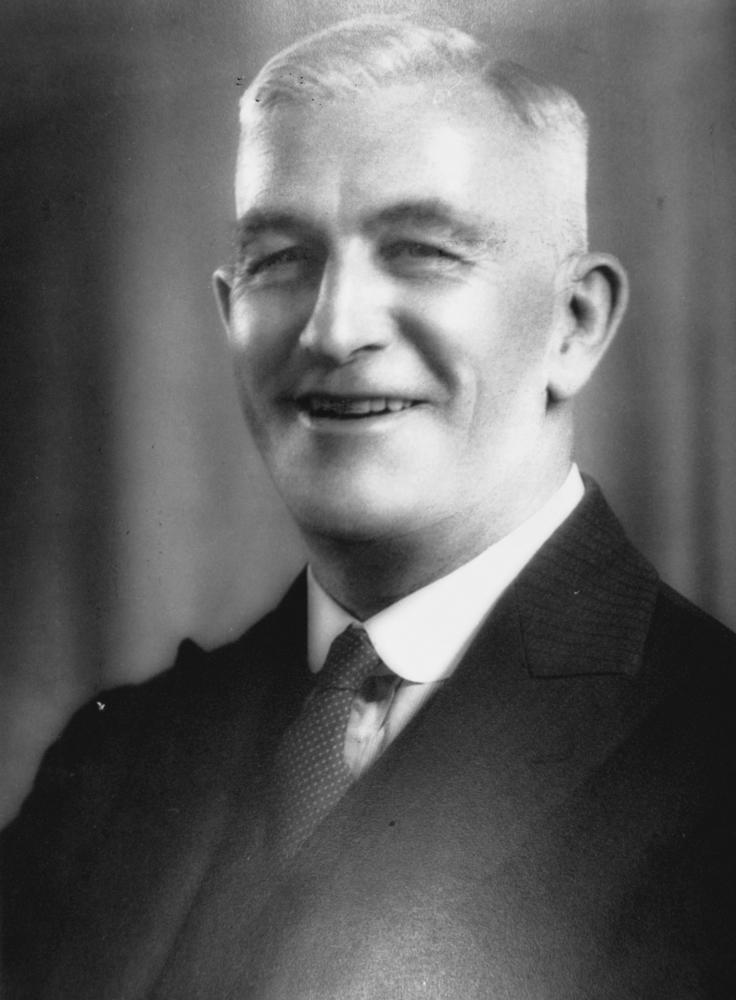

Member of the Australian Parliament for Leichhardt
- In office 28 April 1951 – 11 October 1958
- Preceded by: Tom Gilmore, Sr.
- Succeeded by: Bill Fulton

Member of the Legislative Assembly of Queensland of The Tableland
- In office 11 June 1932 – 28 April 1950
- Preceded by: Electorate established
- Succeeded by: Electorate abolished

Member of the Legislative Assembly of Queensland of Kennedy
- In office 12 May 1923 – 11 June 1932
- Preceded by: John Jones
- Succeeded by: Arthur Fadden

Personal details
- Born: Henry Adam Bruce; 16 May 1884 Wandiligong, Colony of Victoria
- Died: 11 October 1958 (aged 74) Canberra, ACT, Australia
- Resting place: Balmoral Cemetery, Brisbane
- Party: Labor (Queensland)
- Spouse: Elizabeth Aveline Anderson (m. 1920)
- Children: 2
- Education: Haileybury College, Melbourne
- Occupation: Union organiser; Politician

Henry Adam Bruce (16 May 1884 – 11 October 1958), known as Harry Bruce, was an Australian politician and former union organiser. First entering state politics in Queensland, he later entered the Australian Parliament.

He was considered "one of the most popular members of the Labor movement in Queensland", a good mixer, not politically ambitious; although it is considered his career growth was impacted by not doing personal favours or associating with pressure groups. Respected in the caucus, he could also withstand debating with premier William Forgan Smith. Upon his death the prime minister Robert Menzies said "no man in this House would have felt him to be an enemy. Every man felt him to be a friend".

The long and major coastal Bruce Highway, Queensland, bears his name. (Note: The 1929 Bruce Highway in Nauru was named for Australian prime minister Stanley Bruce.)

== Early life ==
Born in Wandiligong, Victoria, from a well-to-do family of parents Ralph Sinclair Bruce and Charlotte (née Roff), Bruce was educated at Haileybury College, Melbourne.

He moved to Cloncurry, Queensland in 1902 or about 1913, for the mining industry, already trained as a metallurgist and mining engineer. He had already joined the Australian Workers' Association in 1910 (which merged with the Australian Workers' Union (AWU) in 1913). He worked at a major copper mine complex, before becoming the Mount Elliott Local Committee chair, secured a 44-hour miners working week with an increase in the minimum wage. Bruce went on to represent mining at the Brisbane conference in 1918, and the Queensland representative at the Australasian unions conference in Sydney in 1919. Appointed an AWU organiser in 1918, he was well regarded. It was likely at this time he made a friendship – "he was one of the most sincere and able exponents of my acquaintance" – with political activist Paul Freeman (c. 1884–1921), who had led a strike at the Mount Elliott Copper Mine (and subsequently expelled from Australia).

He then moved to the Proserpine area with the AWU by 1920.

Bruce held an active interest in cricket, tennis, and surfing, and went onto be considered a good amateur heavyweight boxer. (Note: A suggestion that Bruce was a member of Larry Foley's boxing troupe could not be validated.)

In February 1920 he married Elizabeth Aveline Anderson. They later had two daughters.

== Political life ==
=== 1923–1932 Kennedy (state member) ===
Nominated by November 1922 as a Labor candidate, in 1923 Bruce was elected to the Legislative Assembly of Queensland as the member for the district of Kennedy.

At the start of the Great Depression in Australia, in October 1931 Bruce protested against Arthur Moore's government policy of forced wage reductions, alleging "the unemployed relief scheme was being used merely to save revenue. Railway workers and, at Morningside, quarrymen had been dismissed and put on relief work".

=== 1932–1950 The Tableland (state member) ===
When the seat of Kennedy was abolished, in 1932, he was elected as member for The Tableland. In that year he was appointed Secretary of Public Works; in 1938 he was also made Secretary of Public Instruction, a position he held until 1941.

In January 1935 in response to a Queensland anti-war movement letter sent to the state's ALP, Bruce said in part:

I don't think that the carrying of pious resolutions or such propaganda as being carried out by Anti-War League at present is of any use. ... I think that the Commonwealth Government is lacking in not establishing centres at suitable strategic points for building of war planes and submarines, with the object of defending Australia against invasion.

In March 1939, Harry Bruce met with former prime minister Stanley Bruce at a civic reception in Brisbane City, where their similarities were noted: both were born in Victoria, schooled in Melbourne, one year age difference, and both wives' maiden names were Anderson. Harry however became a first-class amateur boxer, whilst Stanley was an oarsman. Ten years prior in October 1929 Harry Bruce stated he should not be confused with the current prime minister Stanley Bruce as he appeared for the working class, whereas the prime minister "always appeared on behalf of those who sought to push the worker and his family down into the industrial pit where want and privation and abject misery awaited them".

In 1942 Bruce convened the first Australian education convention.

In 1947 he was transferred from Public Works to Public Instruction.

In mid-February 1950 Bruce felt rejected for not having his nomination supported by the Labor Party's Queensland Central Executive for the new electoral district of Mourilyan. Overturning the QCE decision, at a Toowoomba conference a week later he was selected for the new district. On 31 April 1950, aged 64, Bruce announced his retirement from the Queensland Legislative Assembly following three weeks of illness. (Note: Although likely unrelated, Bruce had suffered from malaria as early as 1926 and a relapse in 1937.) At this stage, he and the premier were the last original members of the 1932 cabinet.

=== 1951–1958 Leichhardt (federal member) ===
In March 1951 Bruce contested the Australian House of Representatives as the Labor member for Leichhardt – announcing he had retired from the [Queensland] parliament and not politics, and remaining part of Far North Queensland – and was successful.

Upon his death in office in 1958, as the federal election of that year was drawing close, no by-election was held to replace him.

== Later life ==
By 1932, despite representing The Tableland electorate in Far North Queensland (and in the 1950s, for the federal division of Leichhardt), Bruce now resided at "Wandiligong", 48 Thynne Road, Morningside, South Brisbane; also along with his wife, becoming patrons of the Morningside Amateur Athletic Club in 1936. By 1938, his wife became vice-president of the Playground and Recreation Association. He was also a long term patron and trustee of the Broadbeach Surf Life Saving Club, and vice-patron of Point Danger club, before moving on in 1947 to co-patron of the South Coast branch. Bruce also enjoyed golf.

In September 1941, his thirteen-year-old daughter Elizabeth Margaret 'Betty' Bruce died following a heart attack. In September 1951 his other daughter Jean Bruce married Victor Black at St Mary's Anglican Church, Kangaroo Point.

Whilst at federal parliament on Tuesday 30 September 1958 Bruce had a heart attack and appeared to have survived, but died on 11 October 1958. He was given a state funeral on 13 October 1958 at St Andrew's Uniting Church, Brisbane.

Bruce was buried in Balmoral Cemetery. His sister-in-law Violet Victoria Anderson was already interred, in July 1951. He was survived by his wife Elizabeth and daughter Jean. Elizabeth died in September 1972, and was buried with her husband and younger daughter.

== Legacies ==
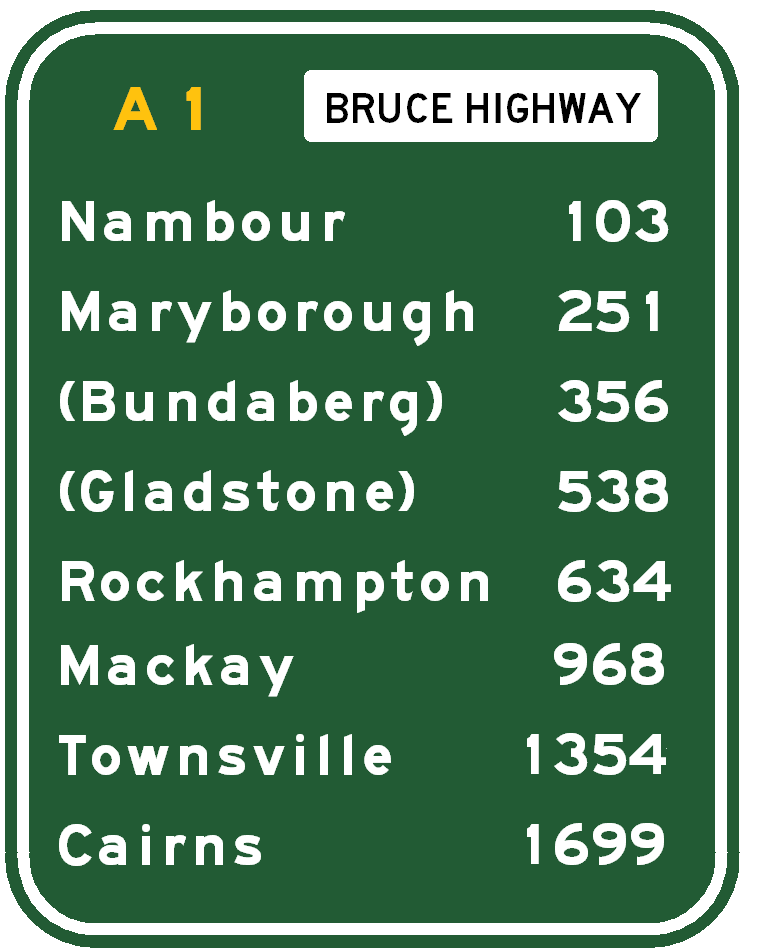
Example of Bruce Highway road sign, with approximate road distances (in kilometres) of towns from Brisbane going northwards.

=== Highway name ===
Bruce's biggest legacy is a named principal highway. He was involved in establishing the Main Roads Commission's road system. With the improvement in state roads, it was requested in early 1934 to have a quality road from Brisbane to the North Coast, and if done, mooted to name it the "Bruce Highway" after the minister. With the road upgraded, in early October Bruce said of the naming, "I appreciate the honour very much". The "North Coast Road" at the Glass House Mountains was officially opened on 15 December 1934 and named the Bruce Highway. In 1940 he stated within his time in office, he hoped to see a main road from Coolangatta to Cooktown. Some already felt the entire road length would be called the Bruce Highway, and the name was applied to other parts of the now-Brisbane-to-Cairns highway over time.

=== Sports ===
Initially between the states of New South Wales and Queensland, in 1938 the Bruce Cup was created and became a national tennis championship for children aged twelve and under, and won by many later-international players. When "that great friend of tennis in this State", as the Minister for Public Instruction, Bruce donated the trophy, "probably the best trophy of its kind in Queensland", and promoted the Schools' Tennis Association, and the availability of coaching to children. It was run by the Australian Primary Schools' Sports Association in the 1980s, and was held in different states each year. By 2018, all Australian states and territories competed in it. It is now conducted by School Sport Australia, with Tennis Australia.

For a period of time in the 1930s in Far North Queensland, there was the "Harry Bruce Cup" for cycling, as well as another "Hon. Harry Bruce Cup" for football.

== Notes ==
Parliament of Australia
Preceded by Tom Gilmore	Member for Leichhardt; 1951–1958	Succeeded by Bill Fulton
Parliament of Queensland
Preceded by John Jones	Member for Kennedy; 1923–1932	Succeeded by Arthur Fadden
New seat	Member for The Tableland; 1932–1950	Abolished
