= Francis Horace Stubley =

Australian politician

Francis Stubley

Member of the Queensland Legislative Assembly for Kennedy
- In office 28 November 1878 – 5 October 1883 Serving with Henry Palmer
- Preceded by: New seat
- Succeeded by: Arthur Rutledge

Personal details
- Born: Francis Horace Stubley; 1833 England
- Died: 23 February 1886 (aged 52 or 53) Foote's Lagoon Camp, Queensland, Australia
- Occupation: Blacksmith

Francis Horace Stubley (1833–1886) was a politician in Queensland, Australia. Born 1833 in England, Died 23 February 1886 in Queensland, Australia. He was a Member of the Queensland Legislative Assembly. He was member for Kennedy from 28 November 1878 to 5 October 1883. Popular amongst the young labourers in the goldfields, Stubley won his seat with overwhelming support.

In 1884 Stubley was sentenced to prison for bankruptcy and concealing assets but released soon after.

Parliament of Queensland
New seat	Member for Kennedy; 1878–1883; Served alongside: Henry Palmer	Succeeded by Arthur Rutledge
