= Charles William Conroy =

Australian politician (1868–1944)

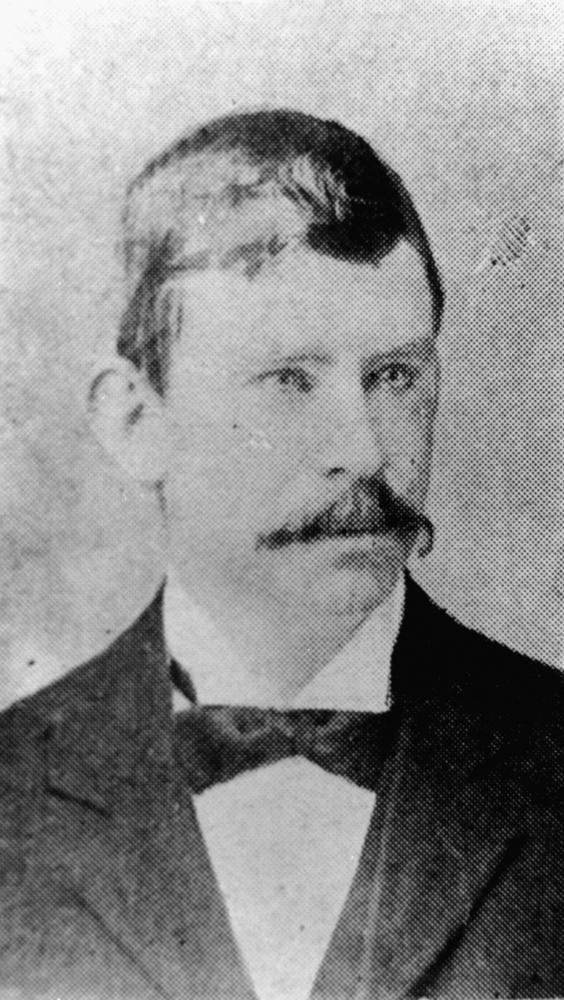
- Conroy in 1909

Member of the Queensland Legislative Assembly for Maranoa
- In office 9 October 1920 – 14 April 1944
- Preceded by: Thomas Spencer
- Succeeded by: John Taylor

Personal details
- Born: Charles William Conroy; 28 April 1868 Toowoomba, Queensland, Australia
- Died: 28 July 1944 (aged 76) Roma, Queensland, Australia
- Resting place: Roma Monumental Cemetery
- Party: Labor
- Spouse: Bertha Walduck (m.1898 d.1964)
- Occupation: Tobacconist

Charles William Conroy (28 April 1868 – 28 July 1944) was a member of the Queensland Legislative Assembly.

== Biography ==
Conroy was born on 28 April 1868, in Toowoomba, Queensland, the son of Michael Conroy and his wife Anne (née Murray) and was educated in Toowoomba. He moved to Roma in his twenties and worked as a clerk for the solicitor, R.H. Dyball. He then went into business as a tobacconist and stationer.

On 15 August 1898, he married Bertha Walduck (died 1964) who shared in much of her husband's public duties. He died at Roma Hospital in July 1944 and his funeral proceeded from the Roma Church of England church to the Roma Monumental Cemetery.

== Public career ==
Conroy, for the Labor Party, won the seat of Maranoa in the Queensland Legislative Assembly at the 1920 Queensland state election and went on to represent the seat until his retirement from politics at the 1944 state election.

He was also an alderman in the Roma Shire Council, being the town's mayor in 1909 and 1910, and again in 1920.

Parliament of Queensland
Preceded by Thomas Alfred Spencer	Member for Maranoa; 1920–1944	Succeeded by John Taylor
