= Electoral district of Kennedy =

Former state electoral district of Queensland, Australia

Kennedy Queensland—Legislative Assembly
- State: Queensland
- Created: 1865
- Abolished: 1950
- Namesake: Edmund Kennedy
- Demographic: Rural
- Coordinates: 20°S 148°E

Kennedy was an electoral district of the Legislative Assembly in the Australian state of Queensland.

== History ==
In 1864, the Additional Members Act created six additional electoral districts, each returning 1 member:

- Clermont
- Kennedy
- Maryborough
- Mitchell
- Rockhampton
- Warrego

The first elections in these six electorates were held in 1865 (that is, during a parliamentary term and not as part of a general election across Queensland). The nomination date for the election in Kennedy was 18 February 1865 and the election was held on 18 March 1865.

When first constituted, Kennedy covered an area from Cardwell to Mackay, west to the Great Dividing Range, taking in the entire Burdekin River system. The district covered the north Queensland coast from Mackay to Hinchinbrook Island. It was named for the explorer Edmund Kennedy.

Kennedy shrank in size over time; it finally included only the rural surrounds of Townsville. It was abolished in the 1949 redistribution (taking effect at the 1950 elections), most of its area being included in Haughton.

== Members for Kennedy ==
The members for Kennedy were:

Member	Party	Term		
George Elphinstone Dalrymple	none	18 Mar 1865 – 19 Jul 1867		
Thomas Henry FitzGerald	none	19 Jul 1867 – 11 June 1869		
John Bright	none	10 July 1869 – 8 Jul 1870		
Edward MacDevitt	none	15 Sep 1870 – 18 Nov 1873		
John Murtagh Macrossan	none	25 Nov 1873 – 28 Nov 1878	Member 2 (1878–1888)	Party
Henry Wyndham Palmer	none	28 Nov 1878 – 5 Oct 1883	Francis Horace Stubley	none
Isidor Lissner	Ministerial	5 Oct 1883 – 12 May 1888	Sir Arthur Rutledge	Ministerial
Isidor Lissner	Ministerial	12 May 1888 – 13 May 1893		
George Jackson	Labor	13 May 1893 – 2 Oct 1909		
James O'Sullivan	Labor	2 Oct 1909 – 9 Oct 1920		
John Jones	Northern Country	9 Oct 1920 – 12 May 1923		
Harry Bruce	Labor	12 May 1923 – 11 June 1932		
Arthur Fadden	CPNP	11 June 1932 – 11 May 1935		
Cecil Jesson	Labor	11 May 1935 – 29 Apr 1950		

== See also ==
- Electoral districts of Queensland
- Members of the Queensland Legislative Assembly by year
- Category:Members of the Queensland Legislative Assembly by name
