= Thomas Alfred Spencer =

Australian politician

Thomas Spencer

Member of the Queensland Legislative Assembly for Maranoa
- In office 27 August 1904 – 18 May 1907
- Preceded by: Arthur Rutledge
- Succeeded by: John Hunter
- In office 20 Dec 1919 – 9 Oct 1920
- Preceded by: John Hunter
- Succeeded by: Charles Conroy

Personal details
- Born: Thomas Alfred Spencer; 1 December 1860 Barraba, New South Wales, Australia
- Died: 10 June 1937 (aged 76) Sydney, New South Wales, Australia
- Resting place: Rookwood Cemetery
- Other political affiliations: Ministerialist
- Spouse: Lily McPherson Gordon (m.1898 d.1957)
- Occupation: Station owner

Thomas Alfred Spencer (1 December 1860 - 10 June 1937) was a member of the Queensland Legislative Assembly.

== Biography ==
Spencer was born in Barraba, New South Wales, to Charles Spencer, a clergyman and rector of Roma, and his wife, Susan (née Dowling). He studied at Roma State School and also received private tuition. He was the partial-owner of Redford, Dalmally, Foyle View, and Morocco South stations.

In 1898, he married Lily McPherson Gordon (died 1957) in Sydney, with whom he had two sons and one daughter. Spencer died in Sydney in June 1937 in an automobile accident several days earlier. His funeral proceeded from St Mark's Church of England, Darling Point, to the Rookwood Cemetery.

== Public career ==
Spencer represented the seat of Maranoa in the Queensland Legislative Assembly on two separate occasions. The first was from the 1904 state election, where, as a member of the Ministerialists, he defeated his Labour opponent. He was defeated three years later in 1907 by John Hunter.

The second time he held the seat of Maranoa was at the by-election in 1919 to replace the previous member, John Hunter, who had resigned from the seat to take up the role of agent-general for Queensland in England. He was once again defeated, this time by Labor's Charles Conroy at the state election held less than a year later.

Parliament of Queensland
Preceded by Arthur Rutledge	Member for Maranoa; 1904–1907	Succeeded by John Hunter
Preceded by John Hunter	Member for Maranoa; 1919–1920	Succeeded by Charles Conroy
