= James O'Sullivan (politician) =

Australian politician

Member of the Queensland Legislative Assembly for Kennedy
- In office 2 October 1909 – 9 October 1920
- Preceded by: George Jackson
- Succeeded by: John Jones

Personal details
- Born: James O'Sullivan; 1867 Horsham, Sussex, England
- Died: 22 April 1921 (aged 53 or 54) South Brisbane, Queensland, Australia
- Resting place: Toowong Cemetery
- Party: Labor
- Spouse: Anastasia O'Brien (m.1897 d.1919)
- Occupation: Fitter

James O'Sullivan (1867 – 22 April 1921) was a member of the Queensland Legislative Assembly.

== Biography ==
O'Sullivan was born in Horsham, Sussex, the son of Flurence O'Sullivan and his wife Catherine (née McCarthy). He married Anastasia O'Brien at Mount Morgan in 1897 and they had two sons.

He died in Brisbane in April 1921 and his funeral proceeded from St. Mary's Catholic Church, South Brisbane to the Toowong Cemetery.

== Public career ==
O'Sullivan held the seat of Kennedy for the Labor Party in the Queensland Legislative Assembly from 1909 until his defeat in 1920.

Parliament of Queensland
Preceded by George Jackson	Member for Kennedy; 1909–1920	Succeeded by John Jones
