= Arthur Rutledge =

Australian politician

The Honourable Sir Arthur Rutledge KCMG, QC
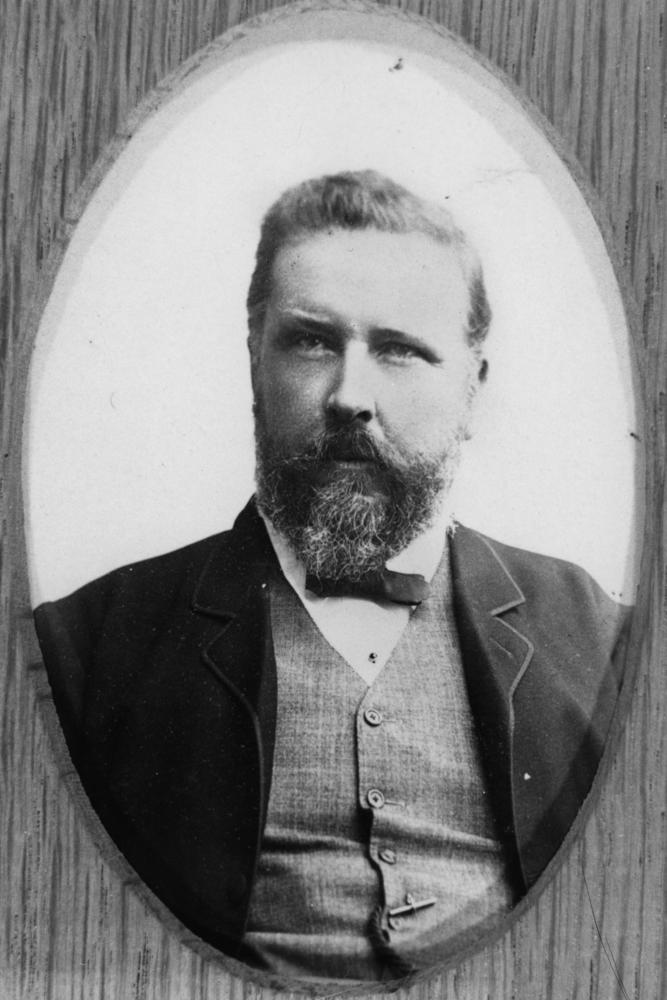

Leader of the Opposition of Queensland
- In office 28 June 1904 – 27 August 1904
- Preceded by: Robert Philp
- Succeeded by: Robert Philp

Member of the Queensland Legislative Assembly for Enoggera
- In office 21 November 1878 – 18 August 1883 Serving with James Dickson
- Succeeded by: John Lloyd Bale

Member of the Queensland Legislative Assembly for Kennedy
- In office 5 October 1883 – 12 May 1888 Serving with Isidor Lissner
- Preceded by: Francis Horace Stubley

Member of the Queensland Legislative Assembly for Charters Towers
- In office 12 May 1888 – 13 May 1893 Serving with Robert Sayers
- Succeeded by: John Dunsford

Member of the Queensland Legislative Assembly for Maranoa
- In office 18 March 1899 – 27 August 1904
- Preceded by: Robert King
- Succeeded by: Thomas Alfred Spencer

Personal details
- Born: 29 August 1843 Penrith, New South Wales
- Died: 8 February 1917 (aged 73) Sydney, New South Wales
- Resting place: Toowong Cemetery
- Party: Ministerial
- Spouse: Mary Thomas Rabone (m. 1869, d. 1908) Rose Ann Davey (m. 1910)
- Occupation: Barrister, Crown Prosecutor, Judge, Methodist minister

Sir Arthur Rutledge (29 August 1843 – 8 February 1917) was a lawyer and politician in Queensland, Australia. He was a Member of the Queensland Legislative Assembly.

== Early life ==
Arthur Rutledge was the son of James and Lucy Ann (née Field). He was born at Castlereagh near Penrith, New South Wales. He went with his parents to Drayton on the Darling Downs, Queensland (then in New South Wales) in 1851, returning to Sydney with them in 1855.

He was the eldest child of the family. His brothers were Rev William Woolls Rutledge 1849–1921, Rev Dr David Dunlop Rutledge 1852–1905.and James Josiah Rutledge 1854–1946. His sisters were Maria Jane Rutledge 1845–1922 (married William John Newton), Susanna Wesley Rutledge 1847–1936 (married Pierre Claude Louat), Lucy Ann Rutledge 1858–1901 (married Dr Joseph Parker), Frances Margaret Rutledge 1861–1919 (married John Scott Connell and Rev Alfred Ernest Jones Ross).

Rutledge entered the Wesleyan Church, being ordained a minister in 1865. His parishes in New South Wales were Tenterfield 1865–1868, Maitland 1868–1869, West Kempsey 1869–1872, Grafton 1872–1875 and, in Queensland, Fortitude Valley (Brisbane) 1875–1878.

Arthur Rutledge was married in Surry Hills (Sydney) on 24 March 1869, to Mary Thomas Rabone who was born in 1848 in Vava'u, Tonga, the youngest daughter of the Wesleyan missionary Rev. Stephen Rabone.

== Political career ==
Rutledge felt that his energy would be better served in a parliamentary seat than in a pulpit. To do that, he also needed the income as a barrister. In May 1878 he was admitted to the Queensland Bar. After unsuccessfully contesting the North Brisbane constituency he was elected with the Hon. James Dickson, for Enoggera at the general election of 1878.

Rutledge's political drive came from his desire to see all the British colonies on the Australian continent as one country. He believed the forced use of Pacific Island labourers on the plantations in North Queensland and the push for separation in the north would destroy Queensland's chance of joining in the federation of Australia. In his bid to win over the north he campaigned and won the seat of Kennedy in 1883. He was appointed Attorney-General in Sir Samuel Griffith's Ministry on 13 November 1883, and held that position until the Ministry resigned on 12 June 1888.

Rutledge was elected for the Charters Towers district in 1888. He was one of the representatives of Queensland at the National Australasian Convention held in Sydney in 1891. At the convention he took part in the drafting of the Australian Constitution aboard the Queensland Government Steam Yacht Lucinda that Easter on the Hawkesbury River.

In 1893 Rutledge attempted to return south from his seat of Charters Towers by contesting his previous seat of Enoggera but failed to win it. He then returned to the Bar as a barrister and Crown Prosecutor.

By 1899 Queensland appeared to be very unlikely to join the Commonwealth and Rutledge felt he had to return to parliament to continue his fight for federation. On 18 March 1899 he won the seat of Maranoa. He again served as Attorney-General from December 1899 until September 1903. Rutland was made a knight bachelor on 15 August 1902, after the honour had been announced in the 1902 Coronation Honours list published on 26 June 1902.

As part of his strategy to become Premier after the election of 1904, Rutledge decided to contest an electorate closer to Brisbane, and chose the semi-rural seat of Nundah which, he assumed, would be easily won by a man of his political experience, especially as it was already held by a fellow Ministerialist Thomas Bridges. Many large business houses backed him, as did the editor of the Brisbane Courier, the local newspaper whose editor was his son-in-law. His public meetings were packed with prominent religious and political leaders, in contrast to a low-key campaign run by Bridges based on his community service and a commitment to keep the cost of railway tickets low. Contrary to every prediction, Bridges won the election by 253 votes. This loss ended Rutledge's political career, and he accepted an appointment as district judge. He was formally Leader of the Opposition for two months from 28 June 1904.

== Later life and legacy ==
Arthur and Mary Rutledge's children (who survived infancy) were Florence Mary Rutledge 1869–1939 (married Charles Brunsdon Fletcher, editor of the Brisbane Courier), Violet Rabone Rutledge 1873–1960 (married Rev Joseph Snell), Harold Moreton Rutledge 1876–1935, Ernest Richmond Rutledge 1878–1942, Olive Cowlishaw Rutledge 1880–1948 (married Arthur Crawshaw Wilcox), Clifton Garfield Rutledge 1882–1943 and Ivy Victoria Rutledge 1884–1950.

Rutledge had a series of appointments as an Acting Justice of the Supreme Court of Queensland, the first of which was on 6 September 1904. On 22 March 1906 he was permanently appointed judge of District Courts while continuing periods on the Bench of the Supreme Court. He held these positions until his death in Manly, Sydney on 8 February 1917. He was survived by his second wife (Rose Ann Davy who he had married on 21 June 1910), his three sons, four daughters and twenty grandchildren.

His funeral was held at the Albert Street Methodist Church in Brisbane and he was buried at Toowong Cemetery. On 3 March 2001, during the Centenary year of the Federation of Australia, Toowong Cemetery unveiled a memorial pavilion and wall to commemorate the lives of Rutledge and his three parliamentary colleagues who had participated in the 1891 Federation Convention in Sydney and are buried in the cemetery. The other members were Sir Samuel Walker Griffith, John Donaldson and Thomas Macdonald-Paterson.

Political offices
Preceded by Robert Philp	Leader of the Opposition of Queensland; 1904	Succeeded by Robert Philp
Parliament of Queensland
New district	Member for Enoggera; 1878–1883; Served alongside: James Dickson	Succeeded by John Lloyd Bale
Preceded by Francis Horace Stubley	Member for Kennedy; 1883–1888; Served alongside: Isidor Lissner	District abolished
New district	Member for Charters Towers; 1888–1893; Served alongside: Robert Sayers	Succeeded by John Dunsford
Preceded by Robert King	Member for Maranoa; 1899–1904	Succeeded by Thomas Alfred Spencer
