= Robert Dunsmure =

Australian politician

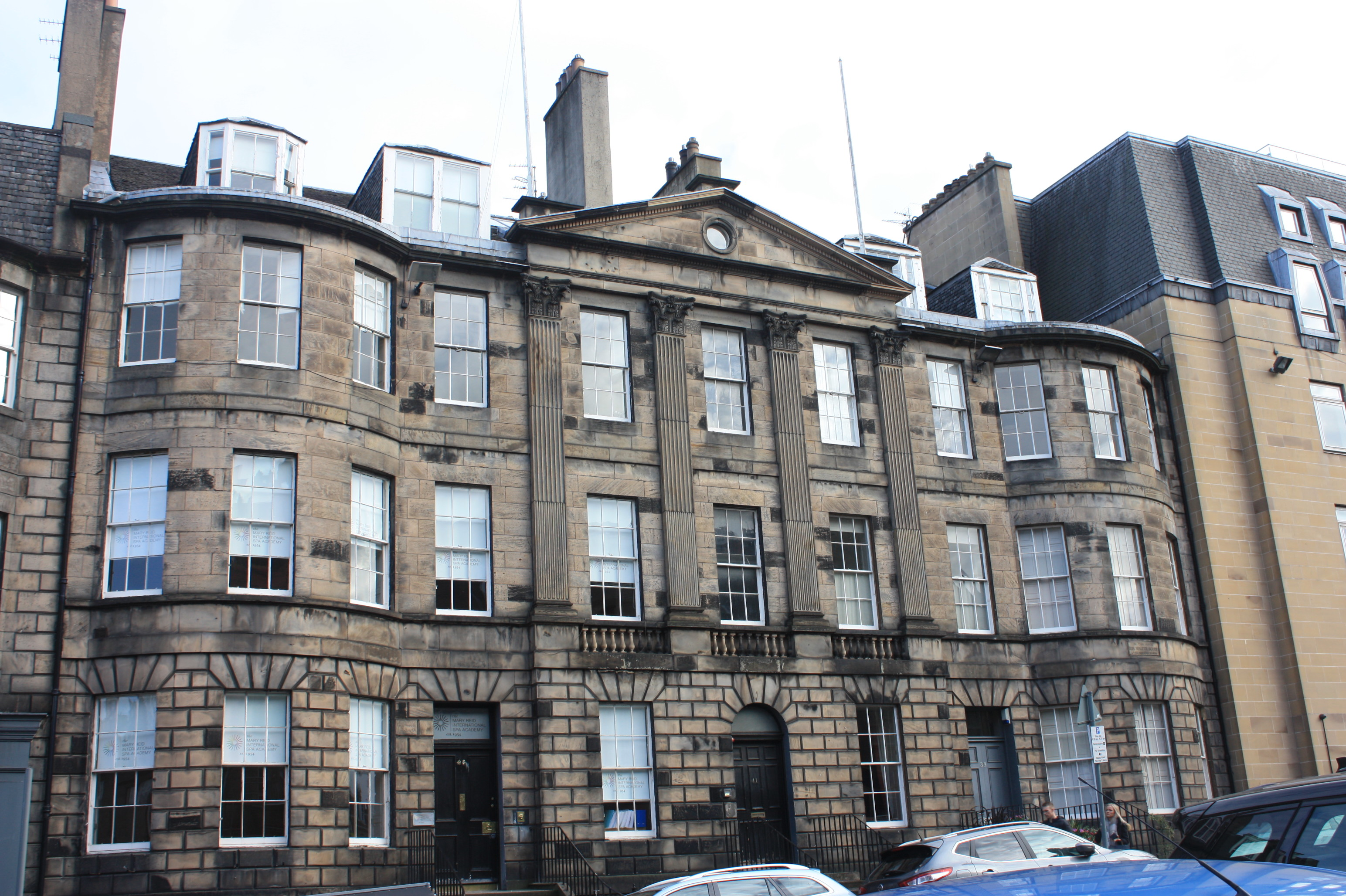
39 North Castle street, Edinburgh (door on right)

Robert Dunsmure (23 December 1852 – 4 August 1894) was a pastoralist and politician in colonial Queensland. He was a member of the Queensland Legislative Assembly from 1888 to 1893, representing the electorate of Maranoa.

== Early life ==
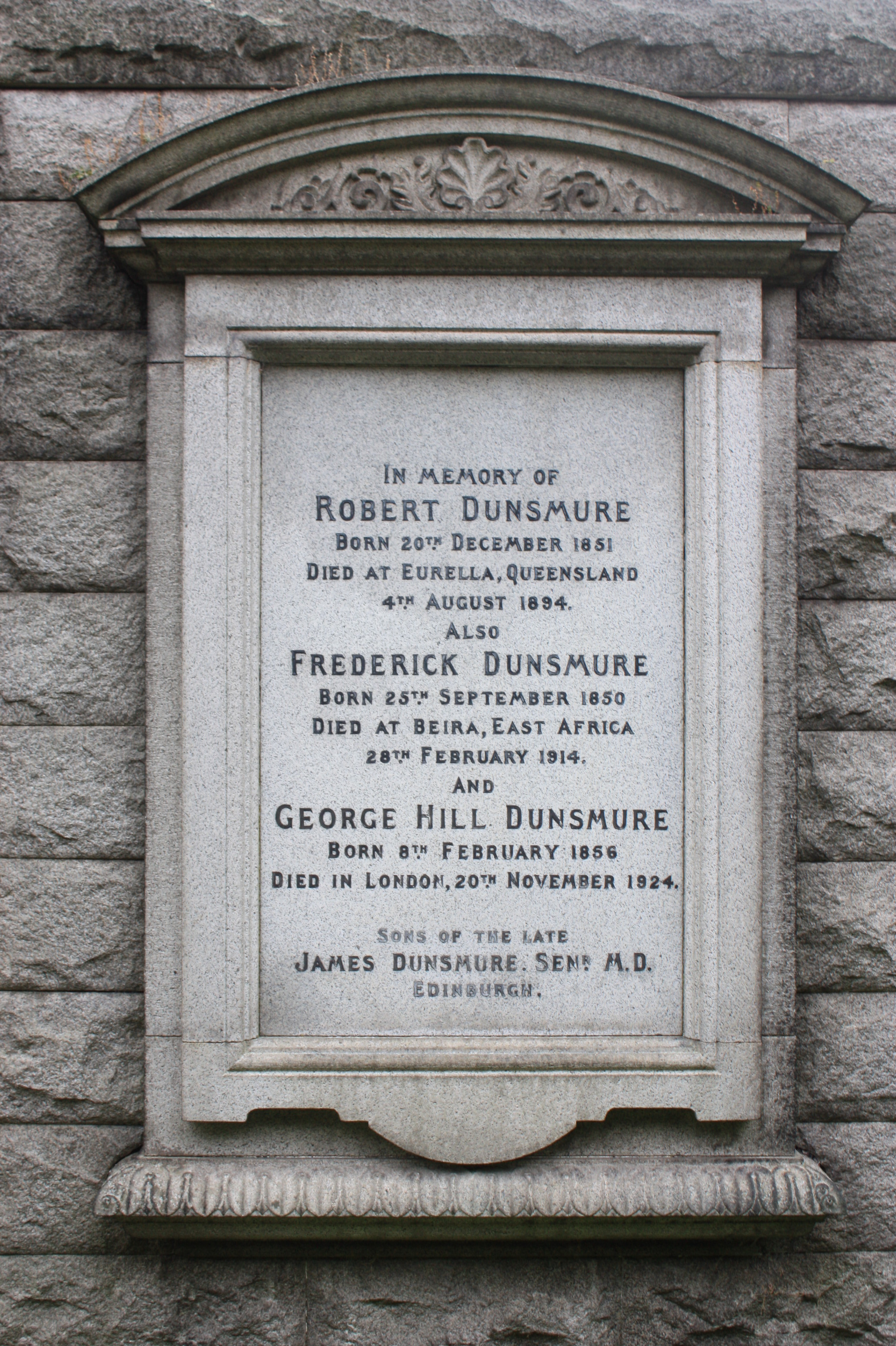
Memorial to Robert Dunsmure, Dean Cemetery, Edinburgh

Robert Dunsmure was born on 23 December 1852 in Edinburgh, the fourth son of Dr James Dunsmure and his wife Catherine (née Hill). They lived at 39 North Castle Street in the New Town. This prestigious Georgian house was the former home of Sir Walter Scott.

He was educated at the Edinburgh Academy.

== Pastoralist ==
Dunsmure came to Australia in 1866, where he gained colonial experience on H. C. Douglas's property, Bringenbrong, in the Upper Murray District in New South Wales. In 1874, he formed a partnership with Mr Douglas and Mr Menzies and bought Eurella Station from Thomas McIlwraith and Mr Robinson. Dunsmure was the manager of the property for the rest of his life.

== Politics ==
In the 1888 Queensland colonial election, Dunsmure defeated Herbert Hunter by a large majority and was elected to the Queensland Legislative Assembly representing the electorate of Maranoa. He held the seat until the 1893 Queensland colonial election, which he did not contest.

== Later life ==
Dunsmure died on Friday 4 August 1894 at his property Eurella Station near Amby, Queensland aged 42 years. He had contracted a severe cold which led to an inflammation of the liver, causing his death. Dunsmure was a foundation member of the Maranoa Masonic Lodge. His body was taken to the masonic hall in Roma where his funeral was held. The funeral cortege from the hall to the cemetery was held by his brother masons, each carrying a sprig of wattle blossom. The burial were conducted according to the rites of the Church of England chaplain and of the Masonic order, each mason placing the sprig of wattle on the coffin.

His father erected a memorial to Robert and his brothers in Dean Cemetery in western Edinburgh. It lies at the start of the dividing wall between the original cemetery and the northern extension.
