= Electoral district of Maranoa =

Former state electoral district of Queensland, Australia

Coordinates: 26.5713°S 148.7853°E

Maranoa Queensland—Legislative Assembly
- State: Queensland
- Created: 1859
- Abolished: 1949
- Namesake: Maranoa River

Maranoa was a Legislative Assembly electorate in the state of Queensland.

== History ==
Maranoa of the original sixteen electorates established in 1859. Geographically it was based on the Balonne River catchment area, including the towns of Roma and St George. Despite various redistributions over the years, the electorate remained in the same general vicinity until its abolition in 1949 when most of it was included in the resurrected Electoral district of Balonne.

== Members ==
The members who represented the electorate were:

| Member | Party | Term |
|---|---|---|
| John Ferrett | | 4 May 1860 – 27 June 1863 |
| William Kennedy | | 27 June 1863 – 28 July 1864 |
| William Miles | | 27 September 1864 – 25 November 1873 |
| Sir Thomas McIlwraith | Ministerialist | 25 November 1873 – 20 November 1878 |
| James Lalor | | 5 December 1878 – 12 May 1888 |
| Robert Dunsmure | | 12 May 1888 – 13 May 1893 |
| Robert King | ALP | 13 May 1893 – 18 March 1899 |
| Sir Arthur Rutledge | Ministerialist | 18 March 1899 – 27 August 1904 |
| Thomas Spencer | Ministerialist | 27 August 1904 – 18 May 1907 |
| John Hunter | ALP | 18 May 1907 – 22 October 1919 |
| Thomas Spencer | PPC | 20 December 1919 – 9 October 1920 |
| Charles Conroy | ALP | 9 October 1920 – 15 April 1944 |
| John Taylor | ALP | 15 April 1944 – 29 April 1950 |

== See also ==
- Electoral districts of Queensland
- Members of the Queensland Legislative Assembly by year
- Category:Members of the Queensland Legislative Assembly by name
