= Electoral results for the district of Balonne =

Queensland, Australia, district election results

This is a list of electoral results for the electoral district of Balonne in Queensland state elections.

== Members for Balonne ==
First incarnation (1873–1932)
Member	Party	Term
Adam Walker		1873–1874
Jacob Low		1874–1883
Boyd Morehead	Ministerialist	1883–1896
George Story	Ministerialist	1896–1904
Edward Land	Labor	1904–1927
Samuel Brassington	Labor	1927–1932
Second incarnation (1950–1992)
John Taylor	Labor	1950–1957
Eddie Beardmore	Country	1957–1969
Harold Hungerford	Country	1969–1972
Don Neal	Country	1972–1974
Don Neal	National	1974–1992

== Election results ==
=== Elections in the 1980s ===
The results for the 1989 election were:

1989 Queensland state election: Balonne
Party	Candidate	Votes	%	±%
National	Don Neal	4,315	57.0	−17.1
Labor	Barrie Ryan	1,633	21.6	−4.3
Independent	John Ellem	932	12.3	+12.3
Independent	Allen Tinkler	687	9.1	+9.1
Total formal votes		7,567	97.0	−0.6
Informal votes		230	3.0	+0.6
Turnout		7,797	90.7	−0.6
Two-party-preferred result
National	Don Neal	5,592	73.9	−0.2
Labor	Barrie Ryan	1,975	26.1	+0.2
National hold		Swing	−0.2	

1986 Queensland state election: Balonne
Party	Candidate	Votes	%	±%
National	Don Neal	5,350	74.1	−0.7
Labor	Elwyn Brookes	1,872	25.9	+0.7
Total formal votes		7,222	97.6	
Informal votes		180	2.4	
Turnout		7,402	91.3	
National hold		Swing	−0.7	

1983 Queensland state election: Balonne
Party	Candidate	Votes	%	±%
National	Don Neal	5,736	74.4	+5.7
Labor	Graham Staerk	1,975	25.6	−5.7
Total formal votes		7,711	98.8	+0.3
Informal votes		94	1.2	−0.3
Turnout		7,805	91.4	+2.7
National hold		Swing	+5.7	

1980 Queensland state election: Balonne
Party	Candidate	Votes	%	±%
National	Don Neal	4,938	68.7	−3.2
Labor	John Barrett	2,249	31.3	+3.2
Total formal votes		7,187	98.5	+0.2
Informal votes		107	1.5	−0.2
Turnout		7,294	88.7	−0.8
National hold		Swing	−3.2	

=== Elections in the 1970s ===
1977 Queensland state election: Balonne
Party	Candidate	Votes	%	±%
National	Don Neal	5,064	71.9	−3.2
Labor	Robert Saltau	1,975	28.1	+3.2
Total formal votes		7,039	98.3	
Informal votes		119	1.7	
Turnout		7,158	89.5	
National hold		Swing	−3.2	

1974 Queensland state election: Balonne
Party	Candidate	Votes	%	±%
National	Don Neal	4,664	75.4	+24.1
Labor	Robert Drenan	1,523	24.6	−4.3
Total formal votes		6,187	99.0	−0.1
Informal votes		63	1.0	+0.1
Turnout		6,250	87.4	−2.4
National hold		Swing	+9.8	

1972 Queensland state election: Balonne
Party	Candidate	Votes	%	±%
Country	Don Neal	3,132	51.3	−8.1
Labor	Bob Drenan	1,768	28.9	−11.7
Queensland Labor	John Donnelly	814	13.3	+13.3
Independent	William Dendle	395	6.5	+6.5
Total formal votes		6,109	99.1	
Informal votes		58	0.9	
Turnout		6,167	89.8	
Two-party-preferred result
Country	Don Neal	4,006	65.6	+6.2
Labor	Bob Drenan	2,103	34.3	−6.2
Country hold		Swing	+6.2	

=== Elections in the 1960s ===
1969 Queensland state election: Balonne
Party	Candidate	Votes	%	±%
Country	Harold Hungerford	3,654	58.9	−3.8
Labor	Ben Ward	2,552	41.1	+3.8
Total formal votes		6,155	99.2	+0.2
Informal votes		51	0.8	−0.2
Turnout		6,206	89.6	+0.6
Country hold		Swing	−3.8	

1966 Queensland state election: Balonne
Party	Candidate	Votes	%	±%
Country	Eddie Beardmore	4,059	62.7	−3.0
Labor	Ben Ward	2,414	37.3	+3.0
Total formal votes		6,473	99.0	−0.1
Informal votes		63	1.0	+0.1
Turnout		6,536	89.0	−1.7
Country hold		Swing	−3.0	

1963 Queensland state election: Balonne
Party	Candidate	Votes	%	±%
Country	Eddie Beardmore	4,266	65.7	+2.6
Labor	Russell Hall	2,231	34.3	−2.6
Total formal votes		6,497	99.1	+0.3
Informal votes		59	0.9	−0.3
Turnout		6,556	90.7	+2.8
Country hold		Swing	+2.6	

1960 Queensland state election: Balonne
Party	Candidate	Votes	%	±%
Country	Eddie Beardmore	4,049	63.1	
Labor	William Dendle	2,371	36.9	
Total formal votes		6,420	98.8	
Informal votes		75	1.2	
Turnout		6,495	87.9	
Country hold		Swing		

=== Elections in the 1950s ===
1957 Queensland state election: Balonne
Party	Candidate	Votes	%	±%
Country	Eddie Beardmore	2,264	43.1	−0.2
Labor	John Taylor	1,988	37.9	−18.8
Queensland Labor	Henry Bunton	995	19.0	+19.0
Total formal votes		5,247	99.0	+0.2
Informal votes		54	1.0	−0.2
Turnout		5,301	91.3	+5.5
Country gain from Labor		Swing	+9.9	

1956 Queensland state election: Balonne
Party	Candidate	Votes	%	±%
Labor	John Taylor	2,616	56.7	−4.5
Country	Eric McCorkell	1,997	43.3	+4.5
Total formal votes		4,613	98.8	−0.3
Informal votes		57	1.2	+0.3
Turnout		4,670	85.8	+0.4
Labor hold		Swing	−4.5	

1953 Queensland state election: Balonne
Party	Candidate	Votes	%	±%
Labor	John Taylor	2,600	61.2	+7.3
Country	Claude Dunshea	1,650	38.8	−7.3
Total formal votes		4,250	99.1	+0.1
Informal votes		38	0.9	−0.1
Turnout		4,288	85.4	−2.0
Labor hold		Swing	+7.3	

1950 Queensland state election: Balonne
Party	Candidate	Votes	%	±%
Labor	John Taylor	2,324	53.9	
Country	Herbert Dearden	1,989	46.1	
Total formal votes		4,313	99.0	
Informal votes		44	1.0	
Turnout		4,357	87.4	
Labor hold		Swing		

=== Elections in the 1920s ===
1929 Queensland state election: Balonne
Party	Candidate	Votes	%	±%
Labor	Samuel Brassington	2,980	63.9	+7.0
CPNP	James Hindmarsh	1,682	36.1	−7.0
Total formal votes		4,662	98.2	−1.2
Informal votes		85	1.8	+1.2
Turnout		4,747	79.1	+0.6
Labor hold		Swing	+7.0	

1927 Balonne state by-election
Party	Candidate	Votes	%	±%
Labor	Samuel Brassington	1,760	59.7	+2.8
CPNP	Ted Maher	1,190	40.3	−2.8
Total formal votes		2,950		
Informal votes				
Turnout				
Labor hold		Swing	+2.8	

1926 Queensland state election: Balonne
Party	Candidate	Votes	%	±%
Labor	Edward Land	2,271	56.9	−5.7
CPNP	Ted Maher	1,721	43.1	+5.7
Total formal votes		3,992	99.4	+0.5
Informal votes		25	0.6	−0.5
Turnout		4,017	78.5	+11.7
Labor hold		Swing	−5.7	

1923 Queensland state election: Balonne
Party	Candidate	Votes	%	±%
Labor	Edward Land	2,189	62.6	+3.4
Country	Richard Nates	1,306	37.4	−3.4
Total formal votes		3,495	98.9	−0.4
Informal votes		37	1.1	+0.4
Turnout		3,532	66.8	+5.1
Labor hold		Swing	+3.4	

1920 Queensland state election: Balonne
Party	Candidate	Votes	%	±%
Labor	Edward Land	1,747	59.2	−1.7
Country	Richard Nantes	1,202	40.8	+40.8
Total formal votes		2,949	99.3	+0.5
Informal votes		22	0.7	−0.5
Turnout		2,971	61.7	−5.9
Labor hold		Swing	−1.7	

=== Elections in the 1910s ===
1918 Queensland state election: Balonne
Party	Candidate	Votes	%	±%
Labor	Edward Land	1,720	60.9	−39.1
National	David Roberts	1,104	39.1	+39.1
Total formal votes		2,824	98.8	
Informal votes		35	1.2	
Turnout		2,859	67.6	
Labor hold		Swing	N/A	

1915 Queensland state election: Balonne
Party	Candidate	Votes	%	±%
Labor	Edward Land	unopposed		
Labor hold		Swing		

1912 Queensland state election: Balonne
Party	Candidate	Votes	%	±%
Labor	Edward Land	1,387	68.6	
Liberal	Jasper Harvey	635	31.4	
Total formal votes		2,022	96.9	
Informal votes		64	3.1	
Turnout		2,086	56.3	
Labor hold		Swing		
