= Archerfield =

Archerfield can refer to:

- Archerfield, Queensland, a suburb in Brisbane, Australia
  - Archerfield Airport
  - RAAF Station Archerfield, a former RAAF base at Archerfield Airport
- Archerfield Estate and Links, a country estate and pair of golf courses in East Lothian, Scotland
