= Archerfield Second World War Igloos Complex =

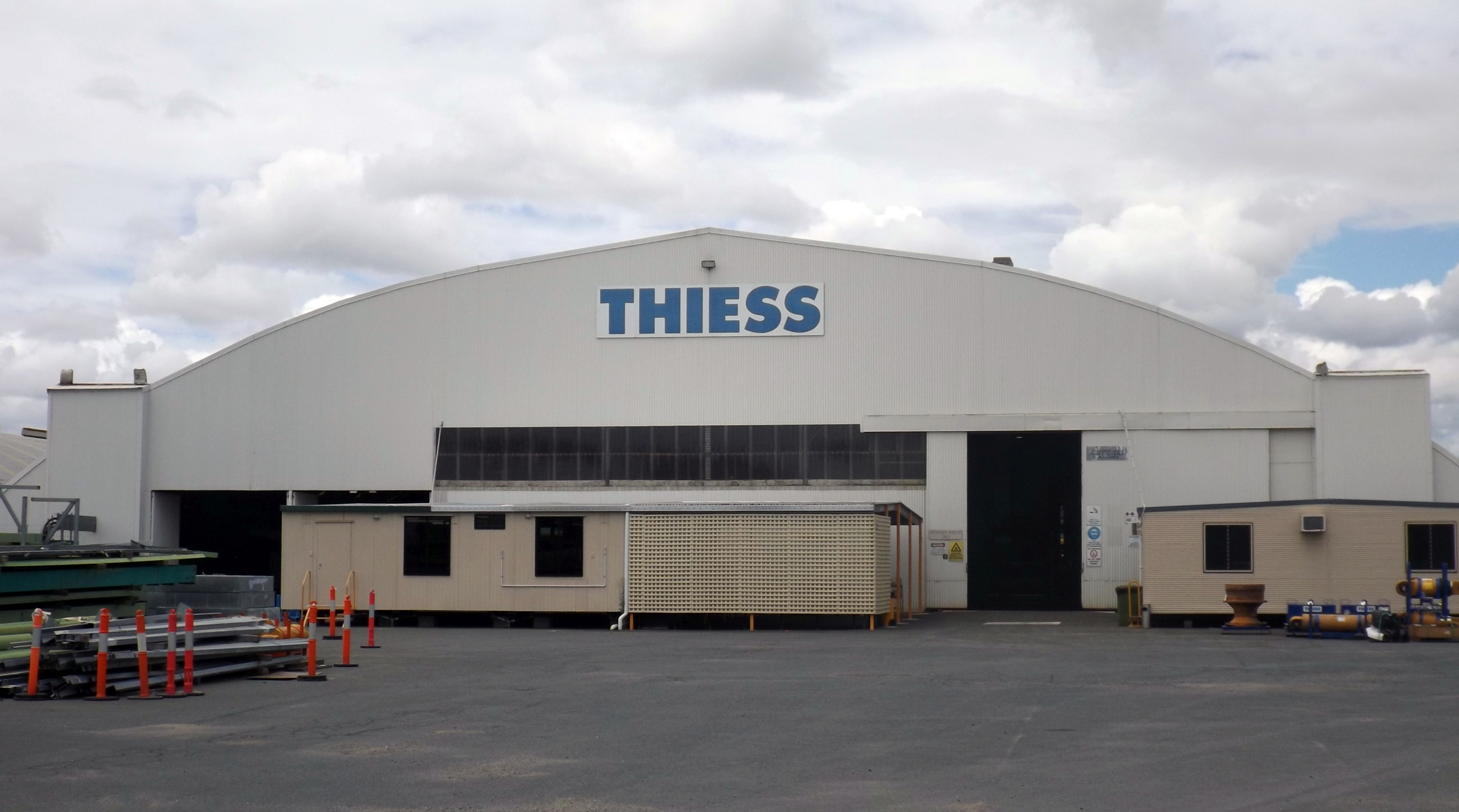
- Igloo No. 4 is occupied by Thiess

- Location within Queensland Location within Australia
- 27.5737°S 153.0196°E
- Location: 98–138 Kerry Road, Archerfield Airport, Archerfield, City of Brisbane, Queensland, Australia

History
- Design period: 1939–1945 (World War II)
- Built: February 1943 – circa April 1944

Queensland Heritage Register
- Official name: Archerfield Second World War Igloos Complex, Hastings Deering (Australia) Ltd premises, Thiess Contractors Pty Ltd premises
- Type: state heritage (built)
- Designated: 27 August 1999
- Reference no.: 602150
- Significant period: 1943–1944 (fabric); 1943–1945 (historical)
- Significant components: drainage, igloo, hangar, bridge/viaduct – road, store/s / storeroom / storehouse
- Builders: Allied Works Council

Archerfield Second World War Igloos Complex is a heritage-listed group of hangars at 98–138 Kerry Road, Archerfield Airport, Archerfield, City of Brisbane, Queensland, Australia. They were built from February 1943 February to circa April 1944 by the Allied Works Council. They were also known as Hastings Deering (Australia) Ltd premises and Thiess Contractors Pty Ltd premises. They were added to the Queensland Heritage Register on 27 August 1999.

== History ==
The Archerfield Second World War Igloos Complex comprises three former igloo hangars and one associated igloo store. These structures are located on a site which had been part of the Archerfield Aerodrome during the Second World War, and each is a timber truss igloo structure with corrugated iron or ribbed metal sheet cladding. The igloos were constructed in 1943–44 by the Allied Works Council for the Department of Aircraft Production. The complex was used for military aircraft maintenance and repair under the control of the US 81st Air Depot Group, and under the U.S. 5th Air Force under the command of General Douglas MacArthur's Supreme Headquarters of the South West Pacific Area. It has been noted in a study of prefabricated Second World War structures that the Archerfield Second World War Igloos are among "the longest clear span buildings existing in Australia."

=== History of the Site, and aviation in Brisbane, to the Second World War ===
The area immediately surrounding the Archerfield Second World War Igloos Complex has been known as Archerfield only since 1929. As early as 1826 the wider area was known as Cowper's (later Cooper's) Plains, named after the Moreton Bay Penal Settlement's first medical officer, Dr Henry Cowper, who, during his regular visits to Limestone Hill (Ipswich), camped overnight on the government cattle run established on the grassy plains east of Oxley Creek, about 7 miles (11 km) south of the main Brisbane River settlement.

The first freehold land in the district was made available in the 1850s, and most of the remaining land was taken up in the 1860s and 1870s. In 1855 Thomas Grenier purchased from the New South Wales Government 640 acres (260 ha), much of which is now part of Archerfield Aerodrome. The land on which the igloo structures are located was granted by Deed of Grant in July 1856 to John and Isaac Markwell. The land was transferred in December 1878 to George and Samuel Grimes, and later to Annie and Martin Finucane in March 1901 who subdivided the property. The land surrounding the igloos was transferred to the members of Spring and Sims families in the 1910s and 1920s, and this land was acquired by the Crown in February 1945 pursuant to the provisions of the Lands Acquisition Act 1906 and The Real Property (Commonwealth Titles) Act of 1924.

The first aerodrome in Brisbane was established on a site at Eagle Farm which had been inspected in February 1922 by Captain EC Johnston, Superintendent of Aerodromes, Civil Aviation Department, as a site for a civil aerodrome. A grass airstrip was formed in 1923, and a layout for hangar blocks with a caretaker's cottage was prepared in February 1924. The Brisbane Civil Aviation hangar was constructed at the site c.1925, and the first commercial operations were commenced by Qantas in 1926, which formed the Brisbane Flying Training School in 1927. By August 1928 a second hangar housing Qantas was located adjacent to the north of the Brisbane Civil Aviation hangar, with a caretakers cottage to the south. However, the aerodrome suffered from poor drainage and flooding.

Significant aviation events during this period included the landing of the Southern Cross in June 1928. Squadron Leader Charles Kingsford Smith and Charles Ulm completed the first trans-Pacific flight from California to Brisbane, landing at Eagle Farm. Kingsford-Smith and Ulm formed Australian National Airways in 1929 and initiated scheduled services between Melbourne, Sydney and Brisbane. Also of note in 1928, Squadron Leader Bert Hinkler AFC completed the first solo flight from England to Australia in 16 days in a light aeroplane. On 10 April 1933, Queensland aviator Mrs Lores Bonney left Archerfield on the start of her solo flight to England.

In September 1928 the Brisbane City Council approved of about 228 acres (92 ha) of farm land at Cooper's Plains (renamed Archerfield July 1929), near Oxley – part of the 640 acres (260 ha) first alienated by Thomas Grenier in 1855 – as the site for a new Brisbane aerodrome. This site was intended to replace the Eagle Farm Aerodrome, which had suffered substantial flooding. In 1929 the Commonwealth Government resumed the bulk of the present airfield, with frontages to Beatty, Mortimer and Boundary Roads, and additional land was acquired in 1930, 1936 and 1942. In August 1929 it was stated that as soon as the aerodrome at Archerfield was acquired and prepared, flying activities would be transferred from Eagle Farm which would then be available for disposal, and that the two existing hangars would be moved to Archerfield, but that the caretakers cottage on the site would remain. Eagle Farm continued to operate until 1931 when it was closed after heavy rains. The first hangars were erected or moved to Archerfield in 1930–31. The Queensland Aero Club, which had been established in 1919, was based at Eagle Farm during the 1920s and moved to Archerfield 1931.

In 1929 the Eagle Farm site was placed with the Department of the Interior for sale, and several options for disposal of the property were considered, including industrial sites or to the general public in broad acre lots or by subdivision. In 1931 it was assessed as having a poor prospect of sale, and it was recommended to lease the land until the real estate market improved.

Until 1939, Archerfield Aerodrome comprised one large, grassy field of nearly 300 acres (120 ha), several hangars located along the Beatty Road side of the airfield just north of the God's Acre Cemetery, and the Queensland Aero Club's facilities at the northern end of the field along Boundary Road. There was no tarmac, and the roads in and out of the airfield and to the buildings were unsealed. The first control tower was a small timber structure on steel posts, which was replaced by a new Archerfield Administration, Passenger Terminal and Control Tower Building erected in 1941. Preliminary plans for a control and administrative building were prepared in 1936 as part of the Commonwealth Department of Civil Aviation's commitment to improve facilities at a number of strategic airfields around the country. From 1935 to 1936, it was reported that the number of passengers travelling through Archerfield had doubled, and that Brisbane's position as a strategic centre in the Empire Air Mail scheme had been enhanced by Qantas duplication of the English mail service.

In June 1939 the Eagle Farm Aerodrome site was still being considered for sale, however by early 1940 the Minister for Civil Aviation, the Honourable James Fairbairn, stated that the Eagle Farm Aerodrome site was very suitable for training purposes, and directed that it be retained. This was supported by Captain Johnston, who originally selected the site. This decision is likely related to Fairbairn's attendance at a meeting in Ottawa in December 1939 in which the details of the Empire Air Training Scheme were concluded. Australia had declared war on Germany on 3 September 1939, and the importance placed on the retention of Eagle Farm in concert with Archerfield is reflected in Fairbairn's report to Australian Prime Minister Robert Menzies that "the only activity that we have undertaken which could lead to the winning or losing of the war by our failure or success in carrying out our undertaking is the Empire Air Training Scheme".

After the outbreak of the Second World War in September 1939, Archerfield Aerodrome assumed a new strategic importance as it provided a base for Australian, American, British, and Dutch air squadrons, was used for the maintenance and repair of military aircraft, and for training purposes. Archerfield Aerodrome played an important role in the Allied war effort, particularly following the entry of Japan into the war with the attack on Pearl Harbor on 9 December 1941. Immediately after the attack on Pearl Harbor, Archerfield Aerodrome was placed on "war alert". The aircraft were dispersed around the boundary of the airfield to minimise damage in case of attack and duty crews were on immediate standby at all times. Other precautions at Archerfield in case of air attack included slit trenches, introduction of camouflage, and the use of decoy aircraft.

=== Military aviation in Australia, and events leading to the Second World War ===
The Australian Flying Corps were involved in the First World War as part of the Australian Army. Following the establishment of the Royal Air Force in 1918, Australia's Minister for Defence, Senator George Pearce, appointed the Swinburne Committee to report on the needs of military aviation. Australia's involvement in the Imperial defence strategy inevitably placed its senior military commanders in a position subordinate to their British counterparts, and as its starting point the Committee accepted the strategy's basis that Australia's security would continue to be based on sea power. The committee found that while they supported the establishment of an air service, they rejected any suggestion that it should have an independent role. Any Australian air force would exist solely to support the sea and land forces.

The Committee recommended the formation of a single, separate air corps, which would be administered by an Air Board composed of members of the Naval and Military Boards, while the wings of the corps allotted to the Navy and Army were to be controlled by the Naval and Military Boards respectively. Cabinet approved the proposal on 18 February 1919, and the Air Board was formed with the Air Corps key role determined as surveillance. The Navy and Army had their own tasks for the air service, and in April 1920 put forward a proposal for the formation of an air force to meet certain fundamental needs of the Navy and Army, which included torpedo bombers, patrol planes, flying boats and seaplanes, fighting planes, reconnaissance planes and bombers. The Air Corps became the Royal Australian Air Force on 31 March 1921 with a total complement of 21 officers, and the bulk of its aircraft came as a gift from the Imperial government and consisted of essentially obsolete machines left over from the First World War.

The Royal Australian Air Force (RAAF) came into being as the world's second separate air force, and its establishment coincided with the decision to place defence spending on a peacetime basis for the first time since the First World War. In 1924, the Air Board described the RAAF's condition as most unsatisfactory and that it survived on a hand-to-mouth existence, with 65 officers and 300 men and only two machines fit for war. Defence funding became even tighter in the Great Depression years, and the situation did not improve until the mid-1930s with the growing threat of war and easing of the Depression.

A particularly strong anti-RAAF move emerged in 1929 when there was a possibility that the Air Force would be dismembered and split between the other two forces, a threat which was apparent until after the mid-1930s. This coincided with Salmond Report of 1928 which recommended that Australia substitute air power (due to its speed, mobility, flexibility and offensive striking power) for sea and land power. As the Air Force entered the 1930s, it was still equipped with 1916–17 types of machines, although the growing threat of the Japanese air force had been recognised as early as 1925 in the Memorandum Regarding the Air Defence of Australia by Air Commodore Richard Williams.

The 1920s had seen a vast improvement across the spectrum of aircraft performance, particularly in range and reliability. This was highlighted in 1928 when Squadron Leader Charles Kingsford Smith and Charles Ulm completed the first trans-Pacific flight from California to Brisbane landing at Eagle Farm, and Squadron Leader Bert Hinkler AFC completed the first solo flight from England to Australia in 16 days in a light aeroplane. The capability now existed for long range strike operations against enemy shipping.

Australia's defence independence was constrained by the commitment to the Imperial strategy and the British connection. The Imperial Conference of 1923 declared that the basis of the Empire's security was the sheltering screen provided by the Royal Navy, a judgement which was confirmed at subsequent conferences until 1937. Twice during the interwar period, a review of the RAAF was thought necessary, but in each occasion the government turned to an RAF officer, resulting in the Salmond Report of 1928 and the Ellington Report of 1938.

Germany had invaded Poland on 1 September 1939, and on 3 September 1939 Australia declared war on Germany. The RAF realised that if massive expansion were necessary, Britain had the industrial capacity to increase aircraft production but it would not be able to train enough aircrew from British sources. Through Australia's commitment to the defence of Britain, agreement was reached that Australia and other Dominions would participate in a massive training program, subsequently known as the Empire Air Training Scheme, the details of which were concluded at a meeting in Ottawa in December 1939. Australia contributed over 27,000 men to the scheme throughout the Second World War. The RAAF's involvement in the South West Pacific Area (SWPA) was more complex than in Europe.

At this time, there were 12 RAAF squadrons, of which two existed in nucleus only and four were citizen force. The aircraft inventory consisted entirely of obsolescent machines. In Brisbane, aviation activities centred on Archerfield (including civil aviation) and Amberley which was under construction. The former Eagle Farm Aerodrome site was taken over by the RAAF for Flying Training purposes on 8 March 1940.

On 7 December 1941 the US Navy Pacific Fleet in Pearl Harbor was attacked by the Japanese. The US Pensacola convoy bound for the Philippines was redirected to Brisbane, arriving on 22 December 1941. Most of the Convoys seventy crated A-24s and P-40s were trucked to Amberley for erection and then for flying to their Clark Field destination in the Philippines, but Archerfield also shared in the erection of both fully crated and deck cargo delivered aircraft. A decision was made in January 1942 to develop Eagle Farm as a major aircraft erection depot and aerodrome from which the planes could proceed. Initial works were delayed by heavy rain for three weeks converting the ground to a quagmire, and as a result thousands of feet of ashes and coke breeze were carted from the gasworks and deposited in order to keep trucks moving with borrow material from Nudgee. Shiploads of aircraft components were arriving at the port and had to be transported to Amberley, and some to Archerfield, for assembly until Eagle Farm was ready. The Americans advised that the runways were urgently needed for the fighter plane protection of Brisbane, and on 29 March 1942 a squadron of P-39 aircraft landed. Archerfield Aerodrome would assume a new strategic importance as it would provide a base for Australian, American, British, and Dutch air squadrons, would be used for the maintenance and repair of military aircraft, and for training purposes, while maintaining its civil aviation functions and well established repair and maintenance facilities.

Shortly after the entry of Japan into the War, Australian foreign policy appeared to make its most dramatic shift since Federation. On 27 December 1941 Prime Minister Curtin stated that Australia now looked to America "free from any pangs as to our traditional links or kinship with the United Kingdom...we shall exert all our energies toward the shaping of a plan, with the United States as its cornerstone". At this time, the RAAF did not have a fighter remotely capable of combating the Japanese Zero, which served the Japanese Naval units.

By February 1942 Japanese forces had gained footholds in territories adjoining northern Australia which made it seem probable that the advance southwards would continue, culminating in the invasion of Australia. This threat of invasion in 1942 is summarised in a statement made by Prime Minister John Curtin in 1944, in which he said "now that Singapore was lost and we were unable to concentrate a superior fleet, the strength of our defences was inadequate to defend Australia...against an enemy with command of the sea and air. We lacked air support, possessing no fighters whatsoever, and our bomber and reconnaissance planes had been reduced to about 50 machines. No country faced a greater danger with less resources than Australia."

The RAAF had not performed well up until this time, with their involvement in the Far East campaign consisting of a series of devastatingly quick defeats, and a humiliating flight down the Malay Peninsula to Singapore and the Netherlands East Indies before final defeat or capture. On the 19 February 1942 the Japanese bombed Darwin, and the Darwin Air Station was not well prepared. Several Australian and American aircraft were destroyed on the ground or shot down, and large numbers of the RAAF deserted their posts with 278 personnel still missing four days after the attack.

It was against this background that the decision to place the RAAF under General Douglas MacArthur was made on 18 April 1942. The directive appointing General MacArthur as Supreme Commander of the South West Pacific Area (SWPA) placed under his control all armed forces which the governments concerned had assigned, or may assign, to this area. The Supreme Headquarters was in Brisbane in the AMP Building (MacArthur Central). Tenants were compulsorily evacuated under military orders from 21 July 1942 until 14 June 1945.

Recognising the need for a coordinating agency for all Australian construction of a military nature, an Allied Works Council (AWC) was formed in February 1942, and the works were mainly carried out by the Civil Construction Corps, into which labour and manpower could be drafted. The Civil Construction Corps, a labour force of more than 50,000 people, was set up in April of the same year. While some of these people were volunteers, the majority were drafted. The AWC was disbanded in September 1945.

=== Second World War Construction Work at Archerfield ===
In November 1939 defence works tenders were announced by the Department of the Interior, including £8,583 for the erection of an Elementary Flying Training School at Archerfield. This was initially named the 3 Flying Training School (FTS), but was soon renamed 2 EFTS, and was based at Archerfield from November 1939 until it was disbanded late April 1942.

In June 1941, it was reported that contracts for 49 buildings at Archerfield for the RAAF had been accepted by Senator Harry Foll, Minister for the Interior. These buildings were constructed by contractor H Trelour and were located at the southeast of the aerodrome at the corner of Mortimer and Beatty Roads. The RAAF 23rd Squadron was based at Archerfield from 30 August 1939 to 6 May 1942, while the RAAF airfield at Amberley was under construction.

On 1 July 1942 the RAAF closed down its Station and Archerfield was then given over entirely to the U.S. operations in July 1942, in concert with the ongoing civil aviation operations and the well established repair and maintenance facilities. Under U.S. Lt. General George Kenney, a Central Command Base for the 5th Airforce was established. Planes flown in and out of Archerfield by the U.S. Air Force included B-17 Flying Fortresses, Liberators, Kittyhawks, Dakotas, and B-26 Marauders. The embryo U.S. camp, named "Camp Muckley", was developed to the southeast of the Archerfield Aerodrome.

The construction of anti-aircraft gun emplacements at Archerfield was proposed in July 1941, however following the bombing of Pearl Harbor in December 1941, the excavation of slit trenches and air-raid shelter construction proceeded swiftly. While Amberley had paved runways, Archerfield still had grass runways. Initially Archerfield was too small, and the runway too short. Extensions to the landing area to the northeastern corner were approved in March 1942 which involved severing Boundary Road, and the existing Queensland Aero Club buildings fronting Boundary Road were moved. March 1942 saw the strengthening of anti-aircraft defences in Brisbane at Archerfield and Eagle Farm, and other locations. Camouflage work at Archerfield was underway from April 1942.

In 1943, a site on nearby Kerry Road was chosen for the erection of 5 large span nailed timber arch igloos. The five Kerry Road igloos were constructed on this site by the Allied Works Council for the Department of Aircraft Production in 1943–44. The igloos were situated near the Archerfield Aerodrome but separated by Beatty Road. A taxiway between the aerodrome and the igloos allowed the structures to be used for the servicing and repair of military aircraft. Four of these igloos were used as hangars and the fifth as a store.

A December 1942 camouflage report for the Department of Aircraft Production indicated that while looking at sites for additional hangars it was noted that the Department of Civil Aviation contemplated extensions of runways east of Beatty Road, and that action was being taken to acquire a strip of land 15 chains (990 ft; 300 m) deep parallel with Kerry Road which was intended to become the main access road to the aerodrome. It was noted that at some future date it was intended to remove some of the existing hangars at Archerfield and place them along Kerry Road, and this may account for the location of the existing igloos well back from the road. Eventually five large igloos with ancillary buildings were constructed. Work on the first of the five igloos (either no.3 or no.4) and ancillary buildings was commenced around February 1943 by contractor William Hughes and Co Pty Ltd. It has been noted that "The igloos are a testament to the then Commonwealth Government's philosophy of dual purpose planning, of high cost projects for wartime and post-war". This "dual purpose planning" would provide for continuing industrial and infrastructure development in the post-war period.

A camouflage report of March 1943 noted the siting of a Civil Construction Corps camp for the "new hangar work" on Kerry Road, and suggests anti-aircraft guns were located there. By March 1943 the initial pair (nos. 3 and 4) of Kerry Road igloo hangars were under construction, and these were noted as being 353 feet (108 m) long and 170 feet (52 m) span and of hardwood construction. The valuable maintenance and airframe repair resources of civilian organisations such as QANTAS and AOA/ANA continued to operate and were much in demand at Archerfield, and QANTAS was at work in the second igloo hangar to be constructed (no.3 or no.4) before construction works were complete in August 1943.

The second pair of igloo hangars to be erected (nos. 2 and 5) featured their abutment pins raised a few metres above the ground on sturdy timber frames, resulting in much greater clearance, and drawings of these two igloos are dated October 1943. These igloos were noted as being 353 feet (108 m) long and 188 feet 6 inches (57.45 m) span and of hardwood construction. By January 1944 the middle two igloo hangars were complete, with the eastern igloo hangar half built and the western igloo hangar not yet erected. By April 1944, all five igloos were almost complete, with the western igloo hangar underway. The fifth igloo functioned as the store, and was noted as being 255 feet (78 m) long and 170 feet (52 m) span and of Oregon construction, and the four igloo hangars were surrounded by hardstand. Taxiways lead to the south of the igloos and then to the west of the site crossing Beatty Road. A photograph dated c.1945 shows the western igloo with a large concrete storm water drain running under the site. A total of 35 buildings including ancillary structures such as administration buildings, lavatories and guard houses were also erected.

The Kerry Road igloos were shared initially by ANA and QANTAS, in the repair and maintenance of military aircraft for the Department of Aircraft Production. One of the middle two igloo hangars was reportedly used to remove planes' engines which were then sent to nearby Salisbury for testing. The larger igloo hangars (nos. 2 and 5) had walkways near the ridge which enabled overhead access of the planes. When U.S. forces reached the Philippines, their activities at the Kerry Road igloos ceased. From February 1945 the middle two igloo hangars were given over to the U.K.'s Royal Naval Air Service. Their transportable Aircraft Maintenance Yard No. 1, referred to as TAMY 1, assembled, repaired and flight tested aircraft for the Fleet Carrier force sent to the Pacific after Victory in Europe. Accounts of large scale dumping at sea of much of the "Lease-Lend" equipment from the decks of carriers, over 50 miles (80 km) off the east coast of Australia, were reported. The RAF and the Netherlands East Indies Air Force were also stationed at Archerfield from mid-1945.

=== Development of the Igloo ===
Faced with wartime manpower shortages as well as a lack of building materials, particularly steel and timber, it was necessary for the authorities to find a method for constructing large, easily assembled structures suitable for such functions as hangars, stores and shelters. Prefabrication provided part of the solution, particularly in Queensland where there was less building infrastructure and equipment, (partially due to fears of bombing raids). Although prefabricated buildings had been in use in Australia from the beginnings of European settlement and World War I saw the development of the Nissen hut, the prefabricated structures used during the Second World War differed in terms of their production line technique, span and sheer size.

American designs and technologies for building large span timber structures were introduced to Australia for this purpose, although it has been suggested that a French engineer employed at Hornibrooks, Breakfast Creek, may have been responsible for the innovative design of the type of timber arched hangar built at Archerfield. These large igloos used small pieces of timber (sometimes green, unseasoned timber) nailed together to form a trussed framework roofed with corrugated iron. The igloo is a light nailed hardwood timber arch construction, where each arm is made up of two half arches more or less freely pinned at two abutments close to the ground level, and at a central or crown pin. Each half arch consists of two adjacent trusses laced together at top and bottom chord level and each truss consists of a top and bottom chord laced together in arch form. As a result, each truss is made up of four main timber chords sprung into arch form, and light timber bracing nailed into position to form a curved open-latticed box truss.

These igloos were designed to have the half arches raised by ropes and pulleys before being pinned together at the centre. The igloos at Archerfield were one of several designs for lightweight long span structures which used timber in small sectional sizes of chords to enable the lattice trusses to be hand nailed in jigs on site and speedily erected at low cost. As previously stated, it has been noted in a study of prefabricated Second World War structures that the Archerfield Second World War Igloos are among "the longest clear span buildings existing in Australia".

=== Post World War II ===
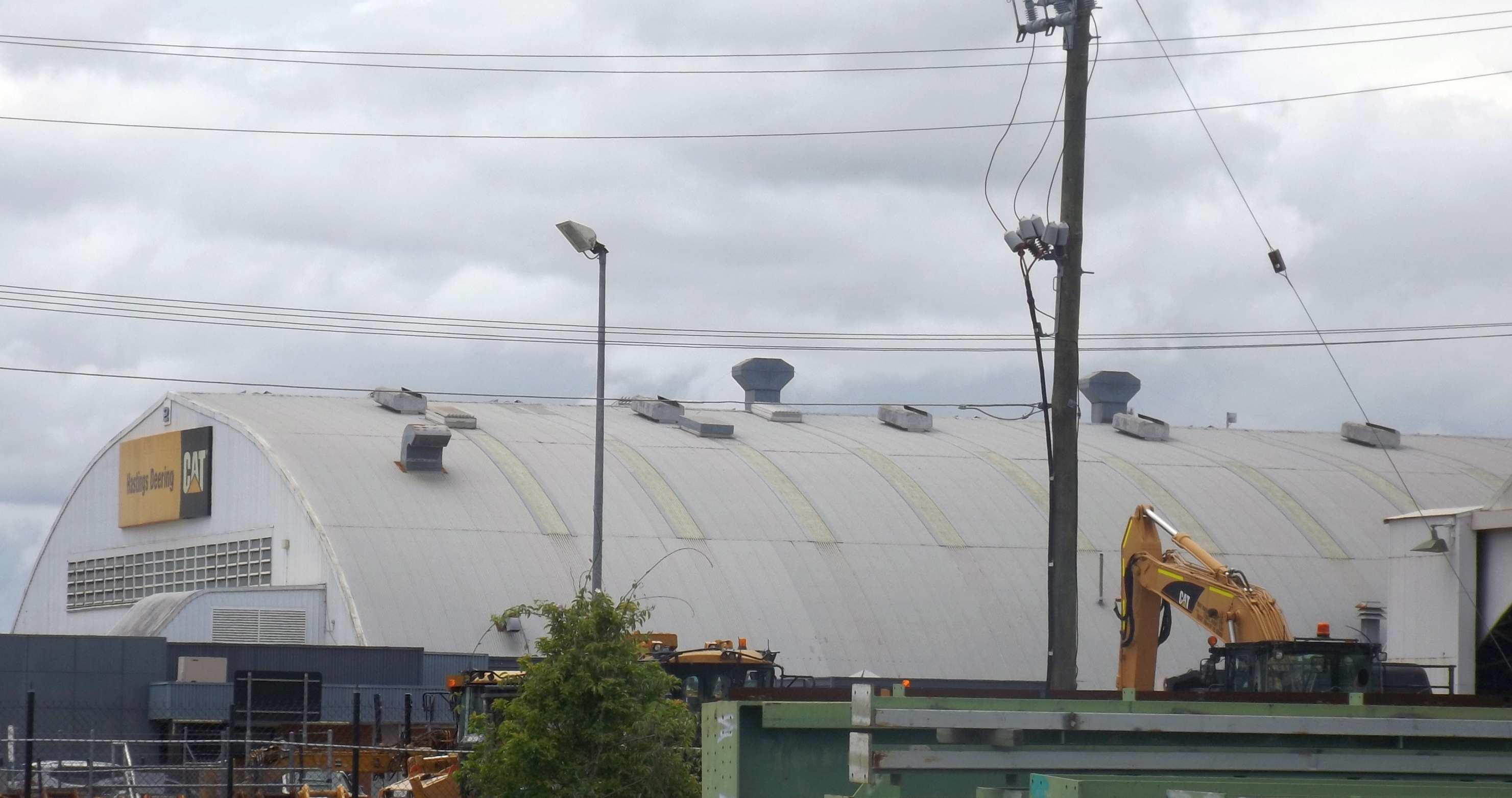
Igloo No. 3, 2015

The land surrounding the igloos was acquired by the Crown in February 1945 pursuant to the provisions of the Lands Acquisition Act 1906 and The Real Property (Commonwealth Titles) Act of 1924. The RAAF and the RAF had a presence at Archerfield Aerodrome until 1946. The RAAF 23rd Squadron returned to Archerfield in 1948, and remained there until 1955. After the conclusion of the Second World War, Eagle Farm was re-established as Brisbane's principal airport by the Department of Civil Aviation with operations commencing in 1949, and Archerfield became Brisbane's secondary airport, catering for general aviation and flying schools. Archerfield Aerodrome is still government owned, and managed by the Federal Airports Corporation.

All five igloos are now in private ownership and one (No. 5) is no longer within the heritage register boundary.

Thiess Contractors Pty Ltd occupied the site in 1962, which was purchased from the Commonwealth for £20,000 and transferred in June 1965. Thiess Contractors Pty Ltd still own the site on which No. 4 igloo is located, and only minor changes to its structure has occurred. Other changes to the Thiess Contractors site include the demolition of a house at the front of the site in 1991. This house was originally used as an office, and has been replaced by an administration building. The other three igloos are now owned by Hastings Deering (Australia) Ltd. Other remnants from the Second World War period on the Hastings Deering property include a drainage channel running through the carpark at the front of the site and a bridge across the drain.

Originally a supplier of milking machinery and tractors, Hastings Diesels Ltd moved from their Melbourne Street premises at South Brisbane to Kerry Road, Archerfield in 1957. The property was transferred in April 1968. Currently named Hastings Deering, the company operates large scale sale and servicing of earthmoving equipment. There have been a few major changes to the Hastings Deering site, including the addition of a single-storeyed administration building to the end of igloo no.2, the construction of additions for such purposes as painting and engine testing, and the re-roofing of the igloos.

== Description ==
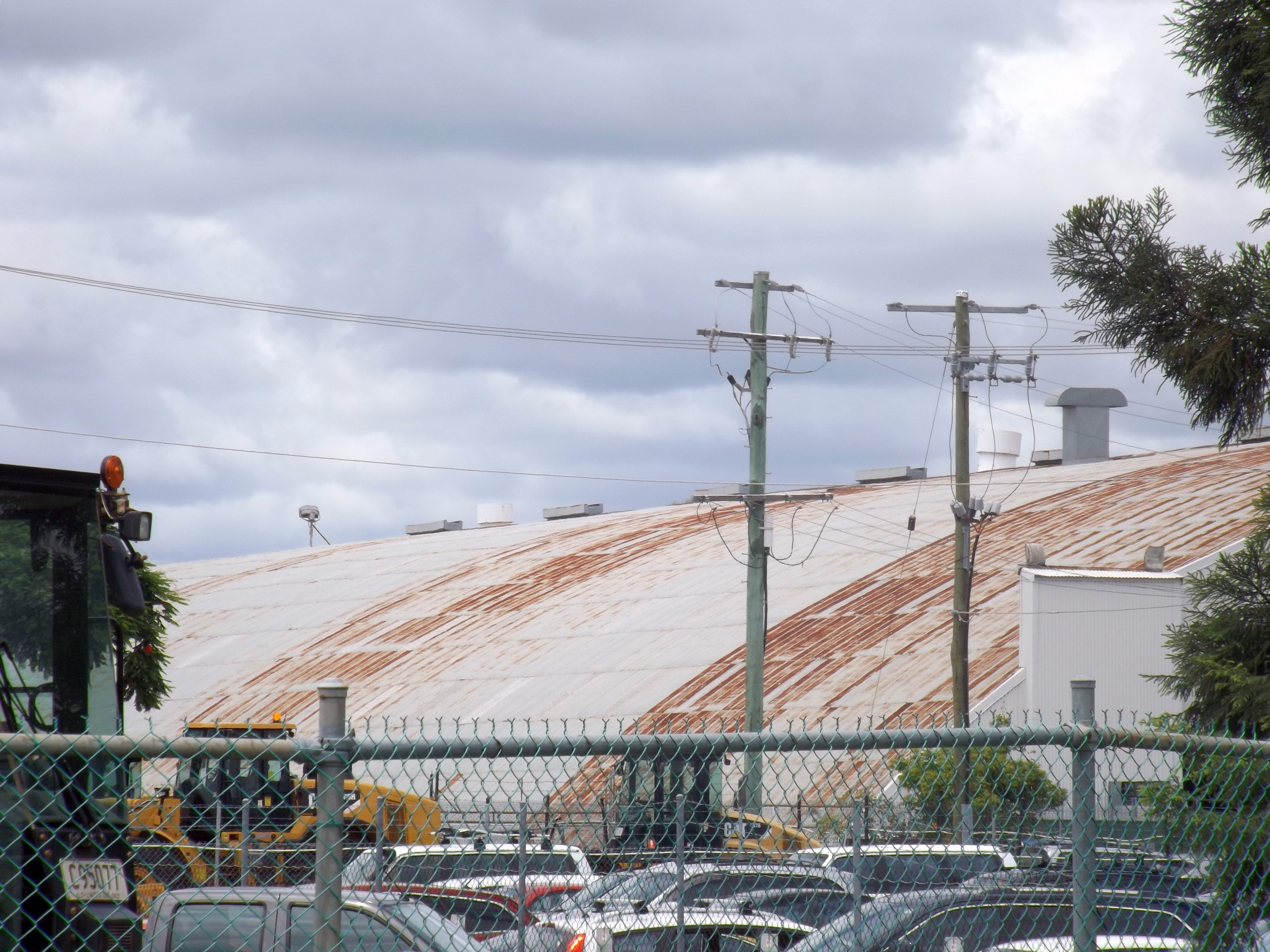
Roof of Igloo No. 4, 2015

The site comprises four timber framed igloos with corrugated iron and ribbed metal sheet cladding. Numbered from the eastern end of the site, the igloos are identified by a number from 1 to 4. The site fronts Kerry Road to the north, with a recreation reserve to the south fronting Mortimer Road.

All four igloos are of similar construction, and use nailed timber arch construction, where each arm is made up of two half arches pinned at two abutments close to the ground level, and at a central or crown pin. Each half arch consists of two adjacent trusses laced together at top and bottom chord level and each truss consists of a top and bottom chord laced together in arch form. Each truss is therefore made up of four main timber chords sprung into arch form, and light timber bracing nailed into position to form a curved open-latticed box truss.

The structures were originally sheeted in corrugated iron, however igloos nos. 1–3 have been re-sheeted with ribbed metal sheeting. The structures also have translucent sheeting at regular intervals, approximately located between each box truss, which provide adequate lighting levels. The igloos have ridge ventilators, concrete floors, and the abutments are fixed by timber plates into concrete footings. Original external stormwater drains along the side of each igloo are still in use, some with grates known as 'Bailey's matting'. Internally, the igloos are used for a range purposes including storage and manufacturing, and consequently have various free-standing structures.

Igloo no. 1 is the former store, and is the smallest of the four igloos. It is located closer to Kerry Road than the remaining three igloos which are in alignment facing north–south. When constructed, it was described as being 255 feet (78 m) long and 170 feet (52 m) span and of Oregon construction, and currently has skillion roofed side annexes.

Igloo nos. 2 is of similar size and is the largest of the four igloos, and when constructed was described as being 353 feet (108 m) long and 188 feet 6 inches (57.45 m) span and of hardwood construction. It has an overhead walkway near the ridge, and its abutment pins are raised a few metres above the ground on timber frames which result in much greater clearance.

Igloo no. 2 has a large single-storeyed administration building added to the northern end, and large additions have also been made to the southern end including a paint booth and engine testing room. This igloo has skillion roofed side annexes, and large louvres have been installed in the northern wall above the administration building.

Igloos nos. 3 and 4 are of similar size, and when constructed were described as being 353 feet (108 m) long and 170 feet (52 m) span and constructed of hardwood timber. Igloo no. 3 has skillion roofed side annexes and the name HASTINGS DEERING on the northern wall above the entrance which has evidence of early sliding door mechanisms. Internally this igloo shows some signs of structural movement, with the cracking of some narrow timber members and cracking of concrete surrounds to abutments. Igloo no. 4 has original gable roofed side entrances, and has been enclosed at the southern end with several demountable structures, and a fence separates it from the surrounding Thiess Contractors site.

Large carparks are located to the north of igloos along the Kerry Road frontage, and several demountable and ancillary structures are located around the igloos and the site in general. An original concrete drainage channel is located along the northern part of the site parallel to Kerry Road, with an original bridge north of igloo no. 3. This drainage channel turns southwards between igloos nos. 1 and 2 and runs to the rear of the property.

== Heritage listing ==
Archerfield Second World War Igloos Complex was listed on the Queensland Heritage Register on 27 August 1999 having satisfied the following criteria.

The place is important in demonstrating the evolution or pattern of Queensland's history.

Archerfield Second World War Igloos Complex is important in illustrating the pattern of Queensland's history, and comprises three former igloo hangars and one associated igloo store. These structures are located on a site which had been part of the Archerfield Aerodrome during the Second World War, and were constructed in 1943–44 by the Allied Works Council for the Department of Aircraft Production. The igloo complex was used for military aircraft maintenance and repair under the control of the U.S. 81st Air Depot Group, and under the U.S. 5th Air Force under the command of General Douglas MacArthur's Supreme Headquarters of the South West Pacific Area. The igloos complex is important in demonstrating the strategic role of Archerfield Aerodrome in the maintenance and repair of military aircraft, and the significant contribution to the Allied war effort made by the well established civil aviation repair and maintenance facilities at Archerfield Aerodrome.

The development of the igloo complex, and Archerfield Aerodrome as a strategic facility for the repair and maintenance of military aircraft, is a result of a shift in Australian foreign policy in December 1941, when Prime Minister Curtin announced that Australia now looked to America free of the United Kingdom to shape a plan with the United States as its cornerstone. As a result, all Allied forces were placed under the control of General Douglas MacArthur in April 1942, and under U.S. Lt. General George C. Kenney, a Central Command Base for the 5th Airforce was established at Archerfield. This contrasts with Archerfield's previous role as Brisbane's airport, and later as a base for the RAAF 23rd Squadron, and a location for the RAAF Elementary Flying Training School which serviced the Empire Air Training Scheme to provide airmen for the defence of Britain, from late 1939.

The igloo complex is representative of the massive wartime infrastructure constructed at and around sites such as Archerfield Aerodrome, and has been noted as being a testament to the then Commonwealth Government's philosophy of "dual purpose planning". This philosophy applied to high cost projects for both wartime and post-war use, and would provide for continuing industrial and infrastructure development in the post-war period. Since the late 1950s, the igloo complex has been continually associated with the industrial development of the surrounding area.

The location of the igloos well back from Kerry Road also demonstrates the intention of the Department of Civil Aviation at the time for this to be the principal entrance to Archerfield Aerodrome, which had been Brisbane's principal airport prior to the Second World War. As a result of the massive infrastructure works during the war, Eagle Farm was re-established as Brisbane's principal airport with operations commencing in 1949, and Archerfield became Brisbane's secondary airport. The igloo complex is a significant example of the work of the Allied Works Council, and as such, is a testament to its ability to meet emergency demands for the construction of Allied defence works during the Second World War.

The place is important in demonstrating the principal characteristics of a particular class of cultural places.

The igloo complex is one of the few highly intact Second World War sites which clearly demonstrates the site's original function, in this case as a major military aircraft repair and maintenance facility, and the important role this played in the defence of the South West Pacific Area. It also has the potential to reveal further information concerning the function of, and activities which occurred at, the site during the Second World War. The igloo complex is also a highly intact group of timber truss igloo structures, which demonstrate the principal characteristics of this type of structure, and represent a significant advancement in timber technology and construction achieved during the Second World War which enabled long span lightweight structures using hand nailed timber in small sectional chord sizes to be erected quickly and at low cost. It has been noted in a study of prefabricated Second World War structures that the Archerfield Second World War Igloos are among the longest clear span buildings existing in Australia.

The place is important because of its aesthetic significance.

The igloos are substantial structures in a relatively flat landscape, and through their bulk and simple form make a considerable aesthetic and architectural contribution to the surrounding area, and are recognised as local landmarks. Internally, the innovative timber structure is clearly expressed, and the expansive interiors and quality of natural light contribute to the aesthetic significance of the structures.

The place is important in demonstrating a high degree of creative or technical achievement at a particular period.

The igloo complex is also a highly intact group of timber truss igloo structures, which demonstrate the principal characteristics of this type of structure, and represent a significant advancement in timber technology and construction achieved during the Second World War which enabled long span lightweight structures using hand nailed timber in small sectional chord sizes to be erected quickly and at low cost. It has been noted in a study of prefabricated Second World War structures that the Archerfield Second World War Igloos are among the longest clear span buildings existing in Australia.
