= Beaufort Palmer =

Australian aviator

Beaufort Mosman Hunter Palmer
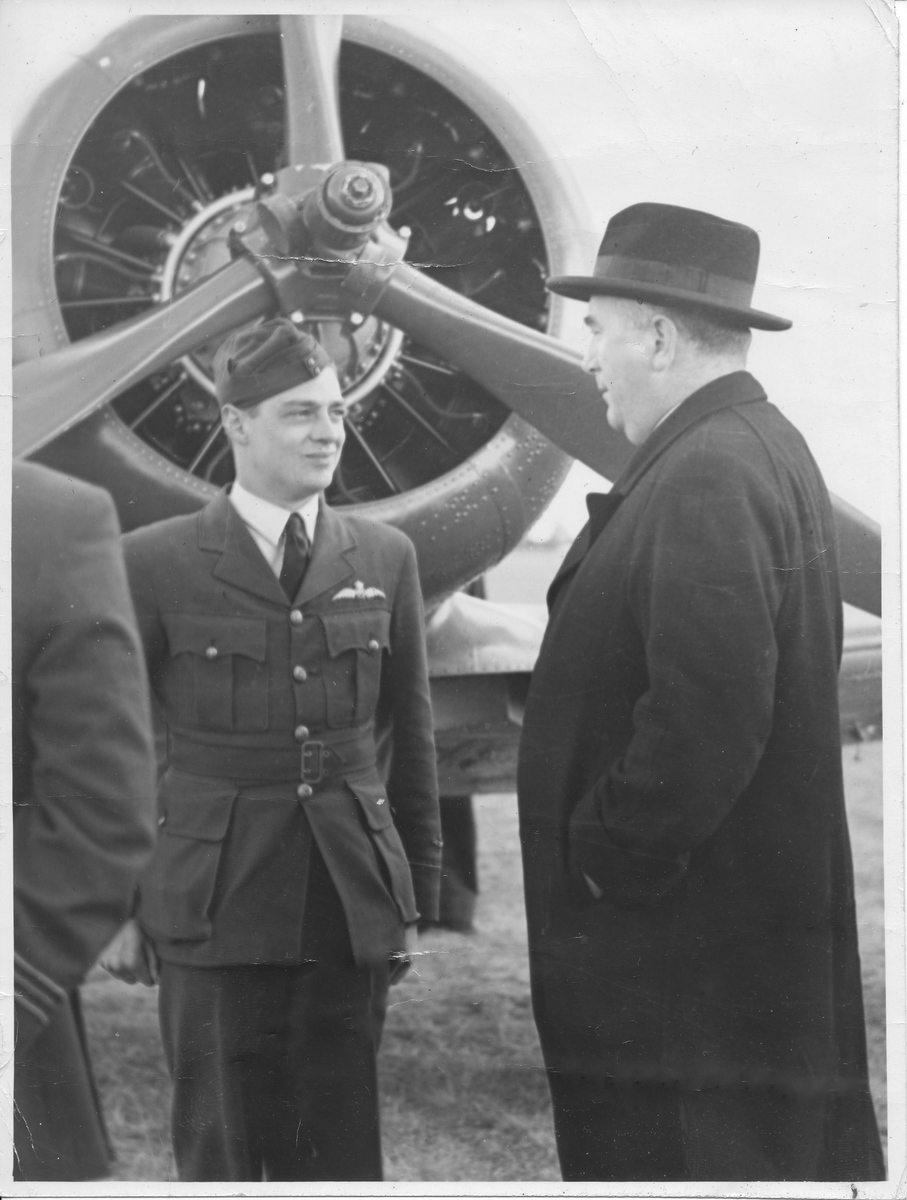
- Squadron Leader B.M.H. Palmer with Prime Minister Robert Menzies in August 1940 at RAAF Station Archerfield, Brisbane.
- Born: 14 December 1919; Brisbane, Australia
- Died: 22 November 2011 (aged 91); Gold Coast, Australia
- Military career
- Allegiance: Australia
- Branch: Royal Australian Air Force
- Service years: 1940–1945
- Rank: Squadron Leader
- Nickname: "Beau"
- Commands: No. 5 Squadron RAAF
- Conflicts: Second World War; South West Pacific theatre; Bougainville Campaign
- Awards: Distinguished Flying Cross

Beaufort Mosman Hunter Palmer, DFC (14 December 1919 – 22 November 2011) was an Australian aviator of the Second World War who was recognised as one of Australia's finest wartime pilot instructors.

== Early life ==
Beau was born in Toowong, Brisbane, the son of Carl Beaufort Hunter Palmer and Florence (née Robinson), and the grandson of Sir Arthur Hunter Palmer KCMG, an Irish-Australian politician and a Premier of Queensland. His name Beaufort was his father's middle name which was in turn a reference to the Beaufort pastoral station operated by grandfather Arthur Palmer. His middle name Mosman refers to his paternal grandmother Cecilia Jessie Mosman, who was the sister of Hugh Mosman who discovered gold in Charters Towers.

Beau was educated at Brisbane Boys' College, where he played in the 1st XV and also rowed in two Head of the River (Queensland) winning crews in 1937 and 1938. He learnt to fly while still at school gaining his pilots wings in 1937 at Archerfield Airport with the Royal Queensland Aero Club.

== Military career ==
Palmer joined the Royal Australian Air Force in 1938, was commissioned and posted to the RAAF Base Point Cook, Victoria as a flying instructor in 1939.

In 1940, Palmer was the first pilot to land at the newly established RAAF Base Amberley near Ipswich.

Palmer "pulled every string he could to gain a battlefield posting" and in 1944 assumed command of No. 5 Squadron RAAF. The squadron was operating in Bougainville and Palmer flew over 100 sorties in 1944 and 1945.

He was awarded the Distinguished Flying Cross on Bouganville where he led an operation that destroyed three or four Japanese tanks in a CAC Boomerang fighter. The tanks were sighted by a New Zealand Vought F4U Corsair pilot which returned to Piva Airfield. Squadron Leader Palmer then led other Corsairs to the target and directed the attack.

In other operations Palmer achieved a direct hit on a Japanese hut at the southern end of Bouganville Island and in February and March 1945 supported the attacks at the Battle of Tsimba Ridge.

Palmer's war ended in late May 1945 when he stepped on an old American anti-personnel mine. His leg was subsequently amputated.

== Post-war career ==
After two years of medical treatment, Palmer purchased Kareelah, a 200 hectares (490 acres) property at Warra in the Darling Downs. Almost 30 years later he regained his wings in the 1970s.

In later life Palmer was active with the Returned and Services League of Australia and contributed to saving ANZAC Park, Dean Street, Toowong, from development. Aged 91, Palmer died on 22 November 2011.
