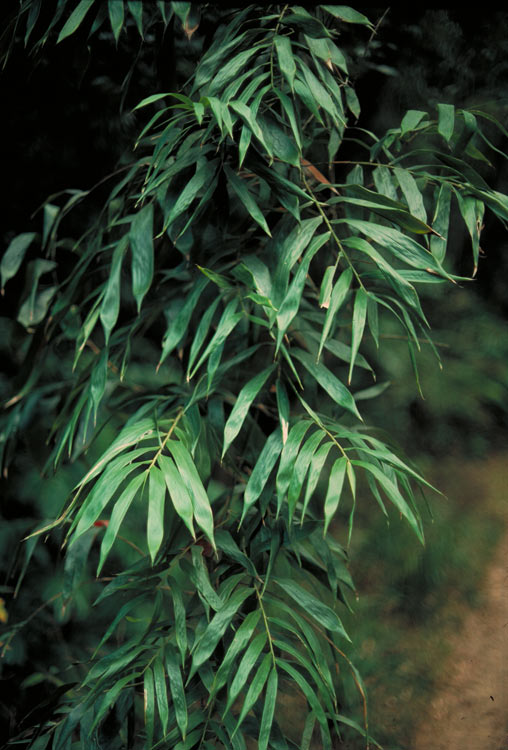

Scientific classification
- Kingdom: Plantae
- Clade: Embryophytes
- Clade: Tracheophytes
- Clade: Spermatophytes
- Clade: Angiosperms
- Clade: Monocots
- Clade: Commelinids
- Order: Poales
- Family: Poaceae
- Genus: Mullerochloa; K.M.Wong
- Species: M. moreheadiana

Binomial name
- Mullerochloa moreheadiana (F.M.Bailey) K.M.Wong

Synonyms
- Bambusa moreheadiana F.M.Bailey

= Mullerochloa =

Species of flowering plant

Mullerochloa is a genus of flowering plants in the grass family Poaceae, with affinities to bamboos. It contains just one species, Mullerochloa moreheadiana, which is native to northeastern Queensland, Australia. It was originally described as Bambusa moreheadiana by Frederick Manson Bailey in 1889.

The plant produces culms (stems) up to 30 m (100 ft) tall from an underground shoot; the shoots themselves can be up to 60 m (200 ft) in length.

The genus name of Mullerochloa is in honour of Lennox Muller, an Australian psychologist turned exotic plant farmer in Innisfail, Far North Queensland. The Latin specific epithet of moreheadiana is in honour of Boyd Dunlop Morehead (1843–1905), an English-born Australian politician.

== Other sources ==
- H.T. Clifford, Austrobaileya Vol. 4, No. 1 (1993), pp. 131-133, Bambusa moreheadiana F.M. Bailey (Magnoliophyta: Poaceae)
