= George Story (politician) =

Australian politician

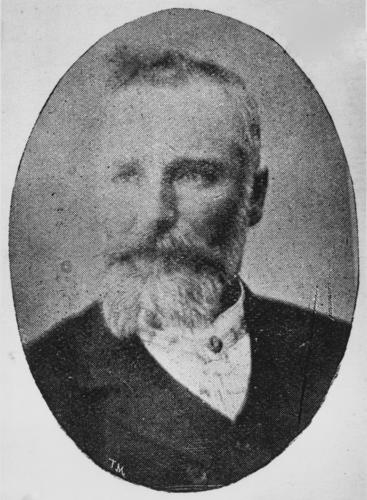

Member of the Queensland Legislative Assembly for Balonne
- In office 11 April 1896 – 27 August 1904
- Preceded by: Boyd Morehead
- Succeeded by: Edward Land

Personal details
- Born: George William Bennett Story; 24 March 1849 Colac, Victoria, Australia
- Died: 3 June 1931 (aged 82) Brisbane, Queensland, Australia
- Resting place: God's Acre Cemetery
- Party: Ministerial
- Spouse: Ellen Lavinia Fletcher (d.1916)
- Occupation: Farmer, miner, general manager

George William Bennett Story (24 March 1849 – 3 June 1931) was a Member of the Queensland Legislative Assembly.

== Early life ==
Story was born at Colac, Victoria in 1849 to Thomas Story and his wife Annie (née Bennett). He attended Geelong Grammar School.

He was employed in the farming industry in Victoria and Tasmania and travelled to New Zealand where he worked as a miner. Story arrived in Queensland in 1881 where he became manager of Burhorah and Dareel stations. Later he became a stock and station agent manager for Cobb & Co. In 1875, he was awarded a Gold Medal by the Royal Humane Society for rescuing three people from the flooded South Esk River.

== Politics ==
At the 1896 Queensland election, Story won the seat of Balonne as a candidate for the Ministerialists. He served three terms before his defeat in 1904.

== Later life ==
In 1907, Story helped establish Sturmfels Ltd. He went on to be manager for the firm until he retired in 1925.

Story had married Ellen Lavinia Fletcher in Tasmania and together they had nine children. He died in Brisbane in 1931 and was buried in God's Acre Cemetery at Coopers Plains.

Parliament of Queensland
Preceded by Boyd Morehead	Member for Balonne; 1896–1904	Succeeded by Edward Land
