= Edward Land =

Australian politician

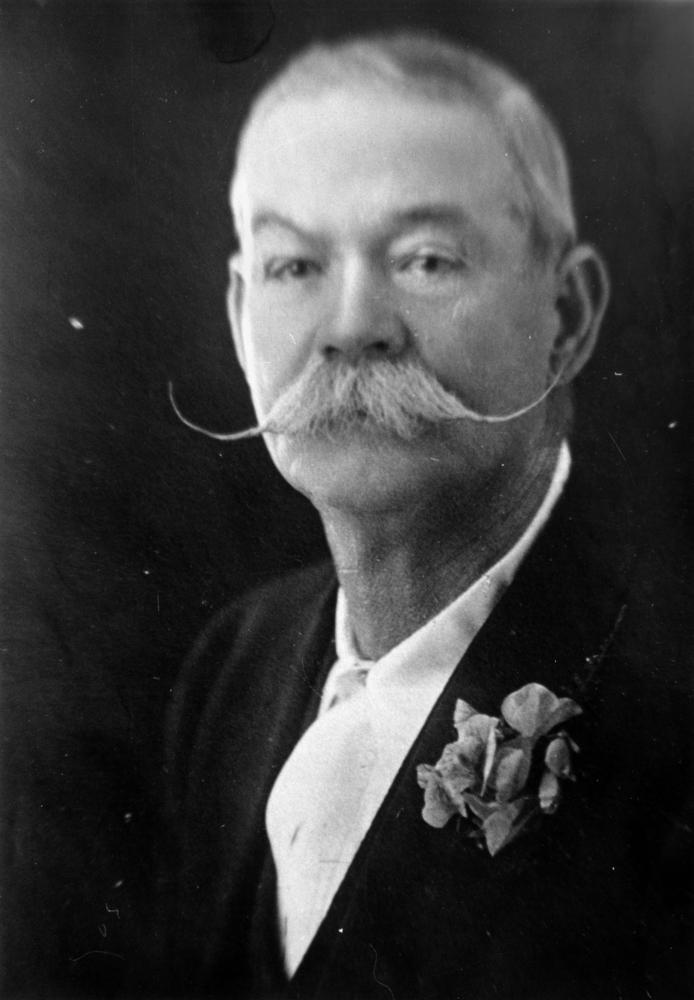
- Edward Martin Land. ca. 1910

Member of the Queensland Legislative Assembly for Balonne
- In office 27 August 1904 – 2 May 1927
- Preceded by: George Story
- Succeeded by: Samuel Brassington

Personal details
- Born: Edward Martin Land; 14 November 1858 Drayton, Colony of New South Wales
- Died: 2 May 1927 (aged 68) Brisbane, Queensland, Australia
- Resting place: Toowong Cemetery
- Party: Labour Party
- Spouse: Sophia Amelia Stacey (m.1881 d.1928)
- Occupation: Farmer, miner, general manager

Edward Martin Land (14 November 1858 – 2 May 1927) was a Member of the Queensland Legislative Assembly. He represented the seat of Balonne from 1904 to 1927. He was born in the Colony of New South Wales in an area that was split off into the Colony of Queensland the year after his birth.

Land died in 1927 and was buried in Toowong Cemetery.
