= Royal Queensland Aero Club =

Australian aero club

- Formation: 1910
- Locations: Archerfield Airport; Brisbane, Queensland
- Region served: Australia
- Website: www.rqac.com.au

The Royal Queensland Aero Club (RQAC) is an Australian aero club and a certified flight training provider based at Archerfield Airport in Brisbane. Established in 1910 as the Australian Aero Club, it is one of the world's oldest aviation organisations and the oldest in the southern hemisphere.

In 2014, Royal Queensland Aero Club provided flight training and rented aircraft for private operations. RQAC's sister company, the Airline Academy of Australia, provided commercial flight training to both domestic and international students, and was responsible for the flight training of Qantas Cadet Pilots. However, on 24 March 2016 the Royal Queensland Aero Club entered voluntary administration. Nigel Markey of the accounting firm Pilot Partners was appointed by resolution of the Board.

== History ==
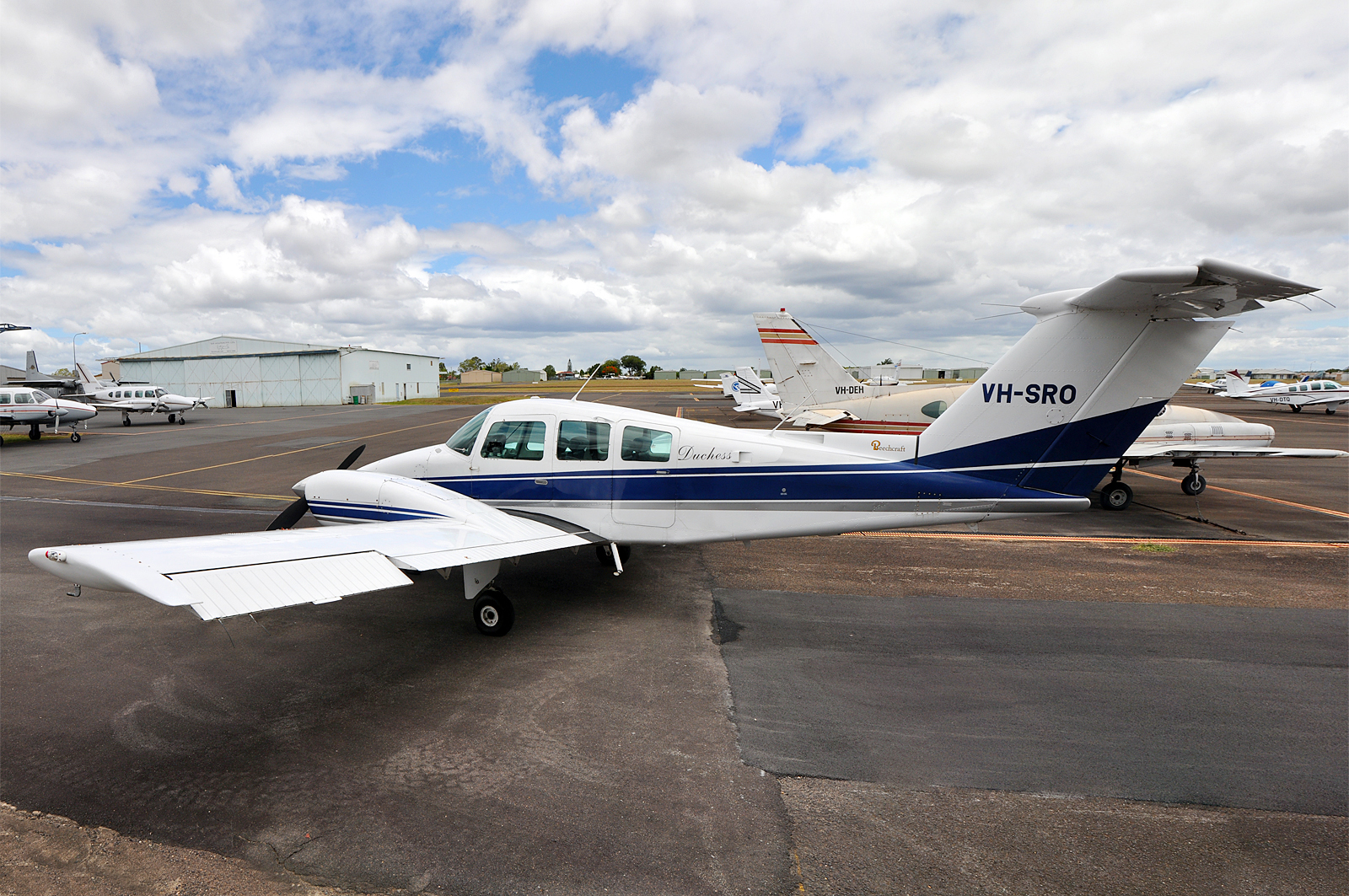
Royal Queensland Aero Club Beechcraft 76 Duchess

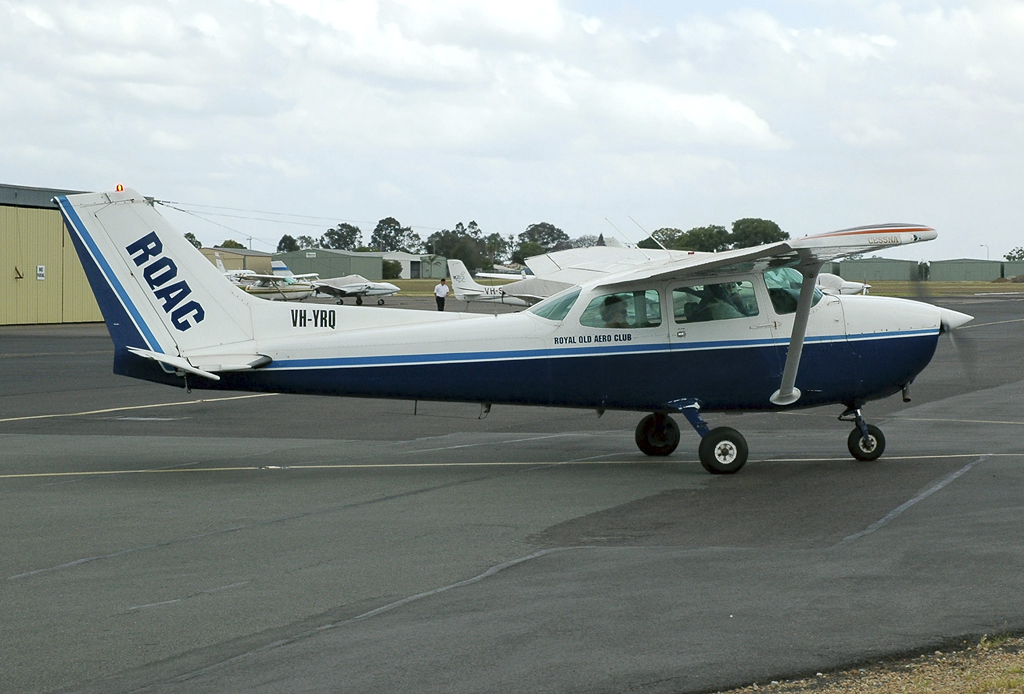
Royal Queensland Aero Club Cessna 172N Skyhawk II

Originally known as the Australian Aero Club (Queensland Section), RQAC was founded in 1910, making it the oldest aviation organisation in the southern hemisphere. Flight training commenced in 1919 after World War I, the organisation was renamed the Queensland Aero Club in 1920 and received approval from the government to commence passenger services later that year, earlier than Qantas.

The Aero Club had close ties with Qantas as their flight training provider, a partnership that exists to this day, through the Airline Academy of Australia, a subsidiary of the Royal Queensland Aero Club specialising in training airline cadets. The organisation was granted the 'Royal' prefix in 1935 and became the Royal Queensland Aero Club. RQAC civil operations ceased in 1940 at the dawn of World War II with the assets being seconded to the Royal Australian Air Force No. 2 Empire Flight Training School. Civil operations resumed in 1945 with the end of World War II. The aero club continued to expand, building new premises in the mid-1960s, purchasing a new hangar in 1984 and creating an associated company, the Airline Academy of Australia in 2006.

The club also produces a bi-monthly publication called "Joystick Jottings".

== Notable members ==
The Royal Queensland Aero Club has had many well-known members over the years, including Sir Charles Kingsford Smith and Bert Hinkler, the first man to fly from England to Australia. In 2015, the club donated an antique propeller for Hinkler's memorial in Italy, and organised a fly-past in his honour.

== Aircraft fleet ==
=== Past fleet ===
- Cessna 172
- Cessna 206
- Citabria 7GCBC
- Cirrus SR20
- Tecnam P2006T
- Redbird Flight Simulations FMX 1000 Synthetic Trainer
- 1942 Tiger Moth – used in the 1950s.
- Gypsy Moths, Hornets, and a Miles Falcon.
