= Boyd Dunlop Morehead =

Australian politician (1843–1905)

The Honourable Boyd Dunlop Morehead
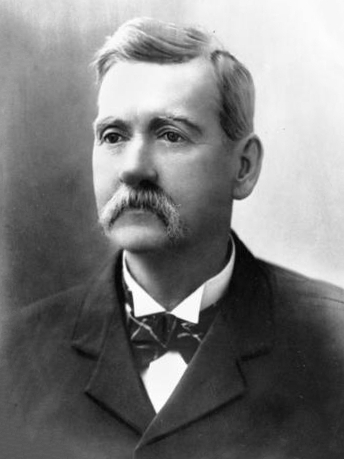

10th Premier of Queensland
- In office 30 November 1888 – 12 August 1890
- Preceded by: Sir Thomas McIlwraith
- Succeeded by: Samuel Griffith
- Constituency: Balonne

Member of the Queensland Legislative Assembly for Mitchell
- In office 4 September 1871 – 30 December 1880
- Preceded by: John Killeen Handy
- Succeeded by: Oscar de Satge

Member of the Queensland Legislative Assembly for Balonne
- In office 5 October 1883 – 11 November 1896
- Preceded by: Jacob Low
- Succeeded by: George Story

Member of the Queensland Legislative Council
- In office 31 December 1880 – 3 August 1883
- In office 10 June 1896 – 30 October 1905

Personal details
- Born: 24 August 1843 Sydney, New South Wales
- Died: 30 October 1905 (aged 62) Brisbane, Queensland, Australia
- Resting place: Toowong Cemetery
- Party: Ministerialist
- Spouse(s): Annabella Campbell Ranken (m.1873 d.1890); Ethel Seymour (m.1895 d.1952)
- Relations: P. L. Travers (niece)
- Children: 8

Boyd Dunlop Morehead (24 August 1843 – 30 October 1905) was a politician in Queensland, Australia. He was Premier of Queensland from November 1888 to June 1890.

== Early life ==
Boyd Morehead was born in Sydney, New South Wales, the second son and child of two sons and two daughters (and the only son to reach full adulthood) of businessman Robert Archibald Alison Morehead and his wife Helen Buchanan, née Dunlop.

== Political career ==
On 4 September 1871 (in the 1871 Queensland colonial election), Morehead was elected a member of the Legislative Assembly of Queensland for the Mitchell electorate. He successfully held the seat in the 1873 and 1878 elections but resigned on 30 December 1880 in order to be appointed to the Queensland Legislative Council on 31 December 1880.

In December 1880 he joined the first Thomas McIlwraith government as Postmaster-General and as the Government's Representative in the Legislative Council, until he resigned from the Legislative Council on 3 August 1883.

On 5 October 1883, Morehead was re-elected to the Queensland Legislative Assembly in the seat of Balonne from October 1883 to April 1896.

When McIlwraith resigned, Morehead succeeded him on 30 November 1888 as Premier of Queensland and colonial secretary. Morehead was an opponent of Women's suffrage Morehead resigned 12 August 1890 and made a long visit to Europe.

The 1893 financial crisis caused heavy losses for Morehead's share investments. Also in 1893 he declined the agent-generalship.

On 10 June 1896 Morehead was re-appointed to the Queensland Legislative Council. He remained a member until his death on 30 October 1905.

== Family ==
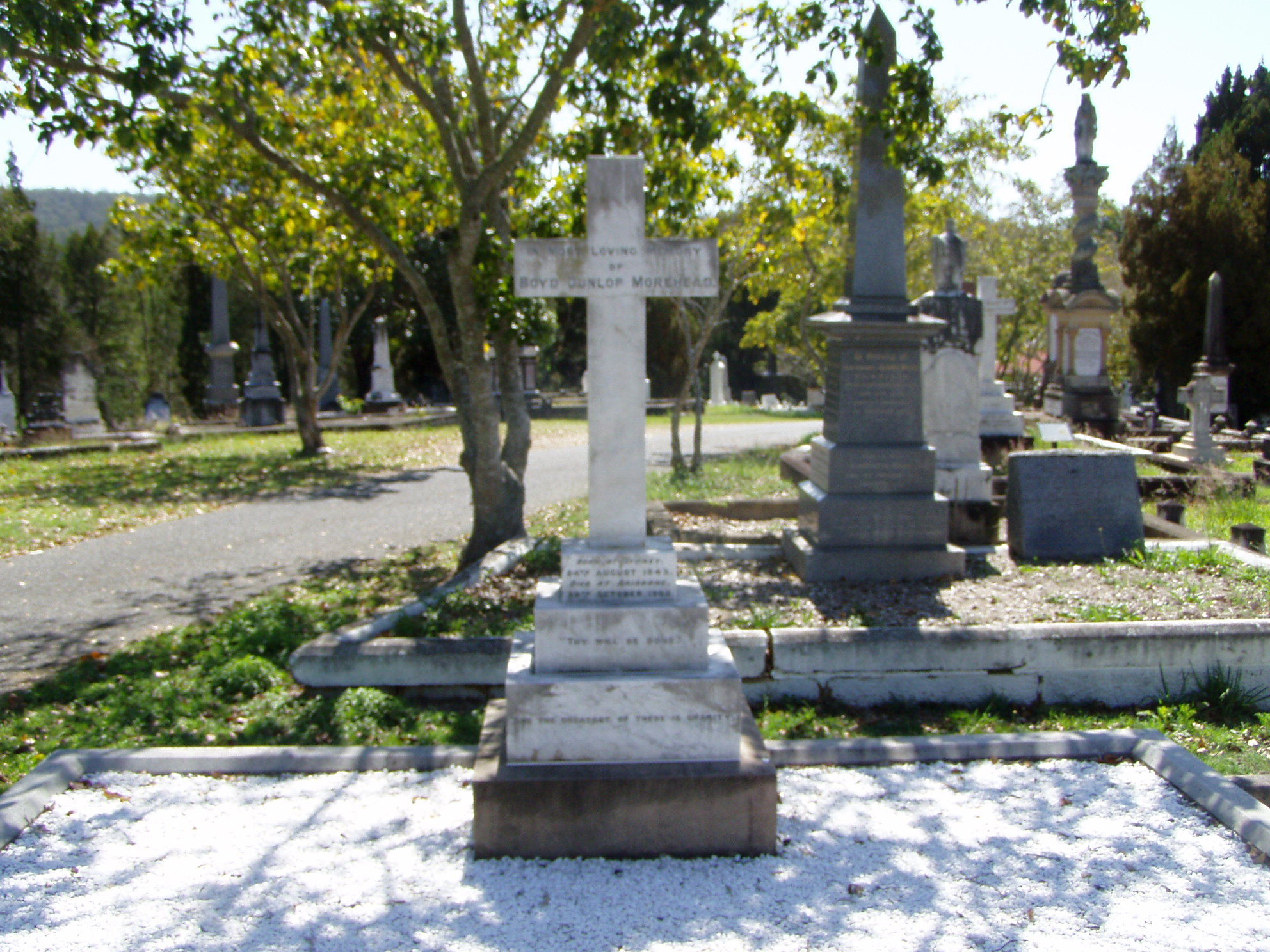
Boyd Dunlop Morehead's headstone at Toowong Cemetery

Morehead was married twice. His first wife was Annabella Campbell, née Ranken (died 1890), whom he married at Lockyersleigh, Goulburn, on 4 June 1873, and with whom he had seven daughters. His second wife was Ethel, née Seymour (died 1952), whom he married in Brisbane on 3 April 1895, and with whom he had one daughter.

His niece Margaret Goff (née Morehead) was the mother of Helen Lyndon Goff, who achieved fame as P. L. Travers, the author of Mary Poppins.

== Later life ==
Morehead died from a cerebral haemorrhage on 30 October 1905 at a private hospital in Gregory Terrace, Brisbane. His funeral proceeded from Valmore, the Wooloowin home of his son-in-law, Orme Darvall, to the Toowong Cemetery.

He was honoured in 1993, when botanist F.M. Bailey published Bambusa moreheadiana, then in 2005, it became Mullerochloa moreheadiana.

Political offices
Preceded by Thomas McIlwraith	Premier of Queensland; 1888 – 1890	Succeeded by Samuel Griffith
Parliament of Queensland
Preceded by John Killeen Handy	Member for Mitchell; 1871–1880	Succeeded by Oscar de Satge
Preceded by Jacob Low	Member for Balonne; 1883 – 1896	Succeeded by George Story
