= Archerfield Airport =

Municipal airport serving Brisbane, Queensland, Australia

Archerfield Airport Brisbane-Archerfield
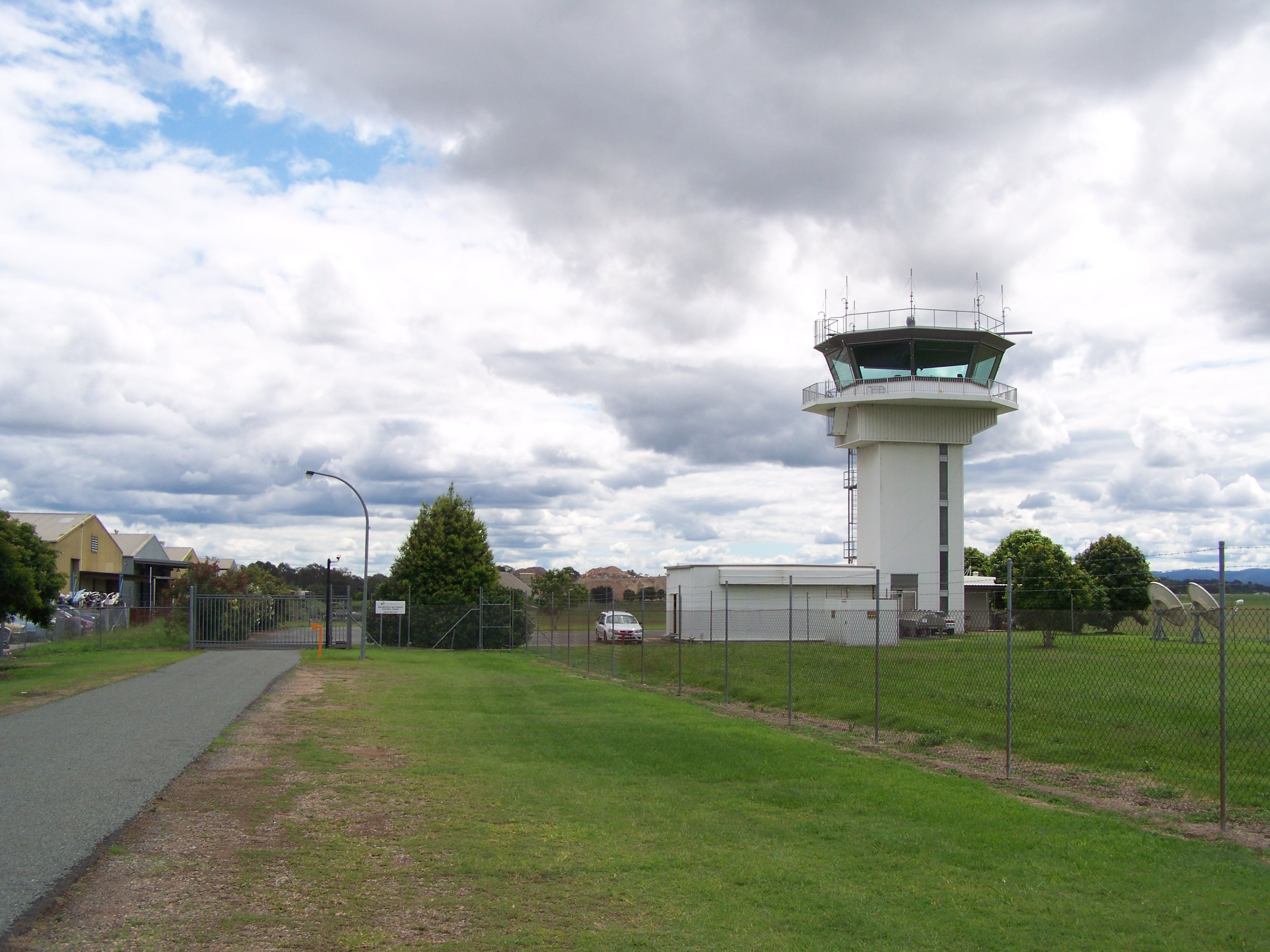
- Archerfield air traffic control tower
- IATA: none; ICAO: YBAF

Summary
- Airport type: Public
- Owner: Leased Federal Airport
- Operator: Archerfield Airports Corporation
- Serves: Brisbane
- Location: Archerfield
- Opened: 1 April 1931; 95 years ago
- Elevation AMSL: 63 ft (19 m)
- Coordinates: 27°34′13″S 153°00′29″E

Map
- Location in Queensland

Runways
Direction	Length		Surface
Direction	m	ft	Surface
10R/28L	1,100	3,609	Gravel/asphalt
10L/28R	1,471	4,826	Asphalt
04L/22R	1,245	4,085	Natural
04R/22L	1,100	3,609	Natural

Statistics (2011)
- Movements: 122,522
- Sources: Australian AIP and aerodrome chart

Archerfield Airport is a leased federal airport located in Archerfield, 11–12 km (6.8–7.5 mi) to the south of the Brisbane CBD, Queensland, Australia. For some time, it was the primary airport in Brisbane, but it is now the secondary airport. During World War II, it was used as a Royal Australian Air Force station. In December 2010, a development plan was released for public comment and included a new parallel runway, airport traffic peaked in the 1980s.

== History ==
The land upon which Archerfield airfield is now situated (Portion 18, Parish of Yeerongpilly) was originally purchased in 1855 by Thomas Grenier, publican of the Brisbane Hotel in Russell Street, South Brisbane. He purchased 640 acres (2.6 km^{2}) of lightly timbered alluvial soil, some of the best grazing land in the district, for a price of £1,920.

Thomas Grenier called his property Oomoropilly. By April 1862, the property was almost established with most of the fences erected and a cottage with outbuildings and a stable erected. By 1865, the property had been subdivided into three farms. Thomas's son George Alexander Grenier and his wife Sarah Greenwood lived on the middle farm where they had been since 1863. Tom and his wife Mary Ann lived in the homestead called Willows which fronted onto Mortimer Road. Franklin Grenier occupied the farm which fronted onto Mortimer and Beatty Roads, and William Leichhardt Grenier ran the farm called Stoneleigh which had a long frontage onto Oxley Creek.

Thomas Grenier died in 1877 and was buried at the cemetery on his property. It was known as Oxley Cemetery at that time. It is now known as Grenier's Cemetery or God's Acre Cemetery and it is located at the main entrance to Archerfield Aerodrome. Franklin Grenier died in 1889 and his farm was bought by the Beatty family in the early 1890s. The other two farms were also sold in the early 20th century.

In 1927, Captain Lester Brain, chief flying instructor for Qantas Airways, landed his de Havilland Giant Moth (DH-61) on Franklin's Farm which was located at the western side of the present aerodrome. His mission was to see if the site was suitable to become an airfield. A Civic Survey was carried out in 1928 by the Brisbane City Council and then, in July 1929, part of the Oxley Ward was zoned for noxious trade as recommended in the Civic Survey. It was renamed Archerfield by the Brisbane City Council to distinguish it from the surrounding residential and farming areas.

The Government finally acquired about 300 acres (1.2 km^{2}) of land in 1929. More land was purchased in 1930, 1936, 1942 and finally the cemetery (God's Acre) in 1946 resulting in a total area of 8,250 acres (33.4 km^{2}). Two light gravel strips 5,000 ft × 500 ft (1,524 m × 152 m) were built and the aerodrome started operations.

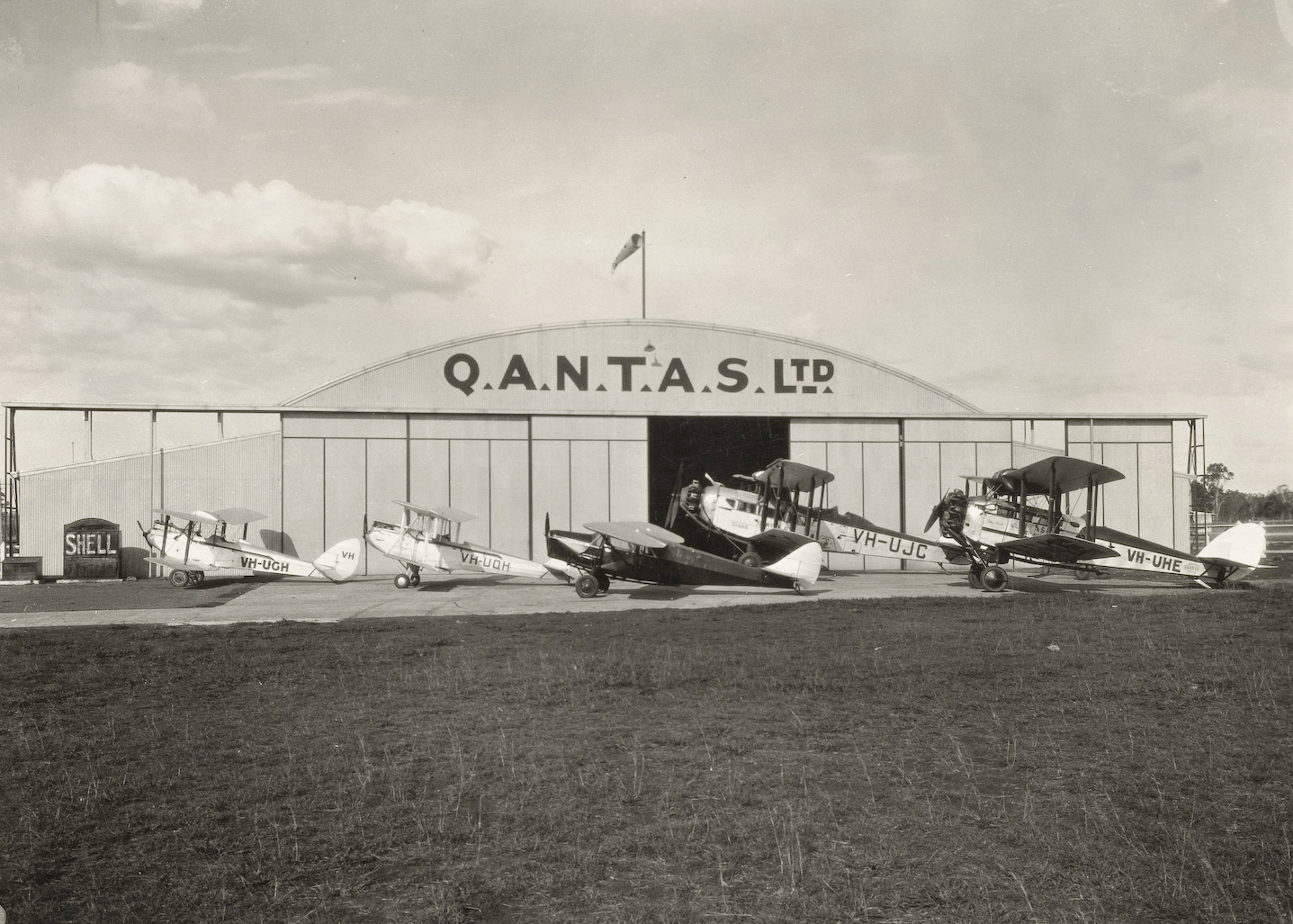
Portion of Qantas fleet, Australia, Archerfield, Brisbane, Queensland, c. 1930

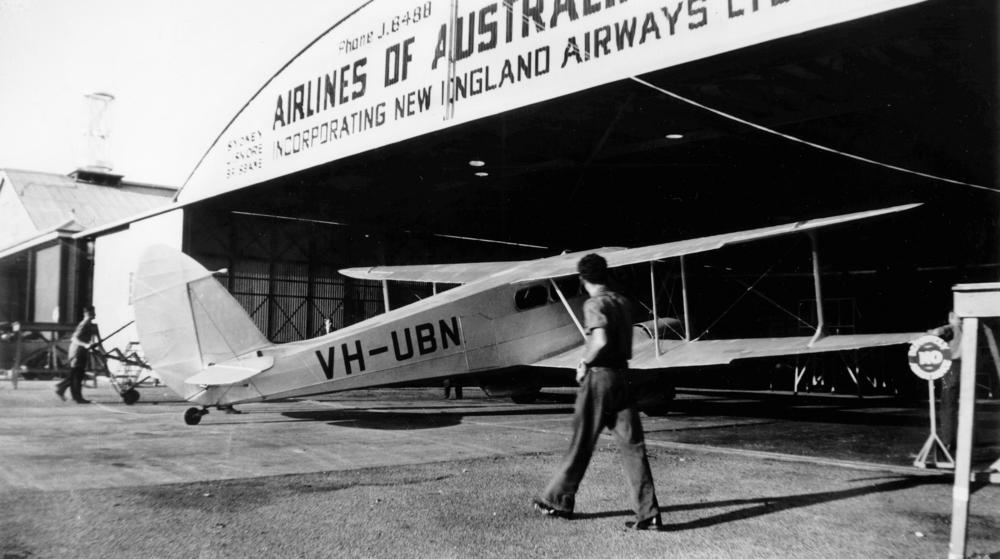
De Havilland DH89 biplane pictured outside a hangar at the airfield, Archerfield, ca. 1937

Qantas moved their operations from Eagle Farm to Archerfield after the first hangars were erected at Archerfield, and the airport was officially opened on 1 April 1931. Australian National Airways (ANA) and Qantas Empire Airways both used Archerfield during the 1930s, as did Trans-Australia Airways (TAA) upon start up in 1946. The Queensland Aero Club, which was established in 1919, moved from Eagle Farm to Archerfield in 1931.

The control tower and many buildings at Archerfield were built during these busy years when Archerfield was the main airport in Brisbane. Although designed in 1936, it was not until 1941 that the administrative building and control tower was finally erected at a cost of £15,000. The control tower on top of the administrative building has since been dismantled.

=== World War II ===
During World War II, Archerfield became an important military airfield for the Royal Australian Air Force, United States Army Air Forces (USAAF), Military Aviation of the Royal Netherlands East Indies Army and Royal Navy Fleet Air Arm. The airport was home to RAAF Station Archerfield from 1939 to 1956, with 23 Squadron being the first RAAF squadron to be based in Queensland. Plaques commemorating the RAAF, USAAF and Royal Navy personnel who served in the Pacific theatre can be viewed in the old administration building.

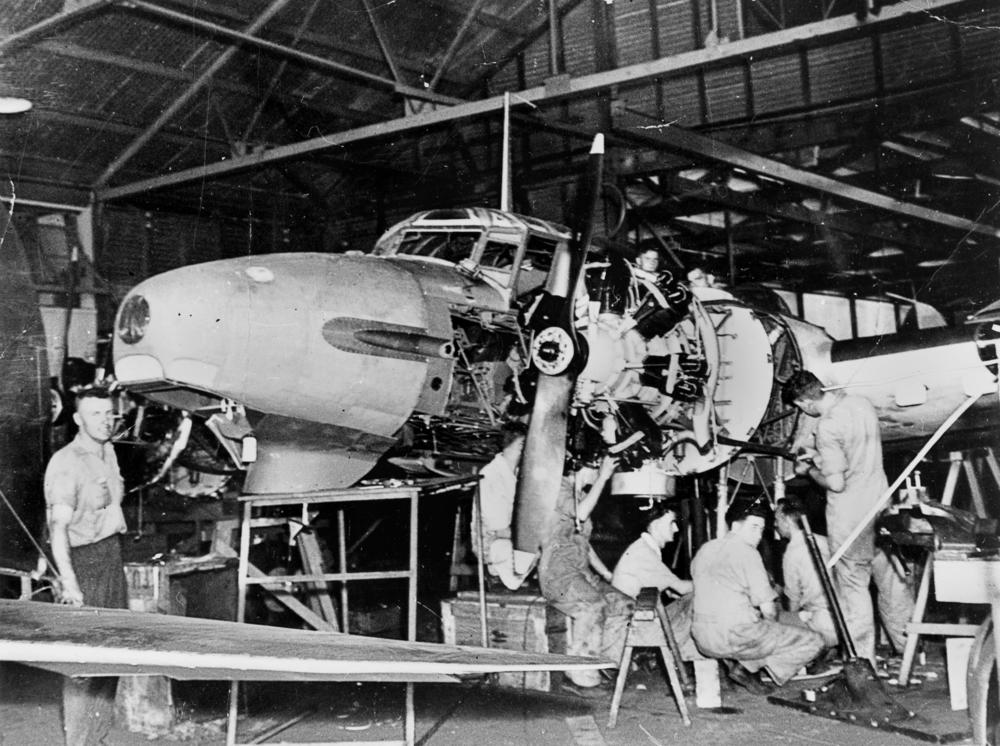
Aircraft mechanics working on an Avro Anson Mk1 aircraft at Archerfield, ca. 1942

With the Japanese conquests in the Philippines and much of the Southwest Pacific in 1941 and 1942, Brisbane became both the headquarters of the USAAF Fifth Air Force, as well as a major logistics and maintenance centre. Personnel transports and cargo shipping from the United States arrived at Brisbane's port facilities, with aircraft being unloaded and transported to Archerfield. The Air Technical Service Command 44th Depot Repair Squadron's mission was to uncrate and prepare these aircraft for combat units assigned to Australia. In addition, the squadron was tasked to perform depot-level repair on aircraft in service throughout Australia. Aircraft processed through the depot consisted of P-38 Lightning, P-39 Airacobra, P-40 Warhawk, P-47 Thunderbolt, P-70 Havoc, B-25 Mitchell, B-26 Marauder, B-18 Bolo, and B-24 Liberators. The United States Army 1622d Ordnance and Supply Company (Aviation) was the main organization coordinating warehousing of spare parts, receiving cargo and shipping supplies from Brisbane.

In addition to the maintenance and logistics, during 1942 the flight echelons of USAAF groups and squadrons assigned to Australia received their aircraft at Brisbane. After a short organizational stay, they were reassigned to their operational airfields around the country. Known USAAF units assigned were:

- 7th Bombardment Group (Heavy), (22 December 1941 – February 1942)
  - B-17C/D Flying Fortress; Aircraft survivors from Philippines Campaign. Reassigned to Karachi, India.
- 3rd Bombardment Group (Light), (25 February – 10 March 1942)
  - A-20 Havoc; Reassigned to Charters Towers Airfield, Qld.
- 22nd Bombardment Group (Medium), (25 February – 7 March 1942)
  - B-26 Marauder; Reassigned to RAAF Base Amberley, Qld.
- 38th Bombardment Group (Medium), (25 February – 8 March 1942; 10 June – 7 August 1942)
  - B-25 Mitchell; Reassigned to Doomben (Eagle Farm) Airport, Qld.
- 16th & 17th Bombardment Squadrons (Light) (27th Bombardment Group (Light)), (10–25 March 1942)
  - A-24 Dauntless; Air echelon of 27th Bomb Group originally assigned to Luzon but airfield overrun prior to aircraft arrival in Southwest Pacific. Received aircraft at Brisbane, unit reformed and reassigned to Batchelor Airfield, Northern Territory.
- 8th Reconnaissance Squadron (24 April – 2 May 1942)
  - P-38/F-4 Lightning. Unit reassigned from Melbourne to Archerfeld, then moved north to Townsville Airport, Qld. for operational service.
- 374th Troop Carrier Group, (12 November–December 1942)
  - Used various (B-18 Bolo, C-39, C-49, C-56, C-60, DC-3, DC-5) aircraft providing logistics and transport duties. Reassigned to Port Moresby Airport, New Guinea.
- 6th Reconnaissance Group, (27 November-10 December 1943)
  - P-38/F-4 Lightning, F-7/B-24 Liberator; Unit reassigned from Sydney to Archerfeld. Reassigned to Port Moresby Airport, New Guinea.
- 58th Fighter Group, (21 November – 28 December 1943)
  - P-47 Thunderbolt; Unit reassigned from Sydney to Archerfeld. Reassigned to Dobodura, New Guinea.

The main USAAF flying unit permanently assigned to Archerfield was the Air Transport Command 21st Troop Carrier Squadron from April 1942 to August 1944. Various USAAF bombers and fighters of various types transited the airport, however, throughout the war.

=== Postwar years ===
After World War II, Ansett ANA and Trans Australia Airlines moved their operations to Eagle Farm Airport. The improvements to Archerfield allowed it to assume its role of secondary and civil aviation airport.

In 1998, the airport was leased by the Federal Airports Corporation to the Archerfield Airport Corporation. Today, Archerfield is used mainly for civil aviation. It is home to the Queensland Government Air (QGAir) Rescue helicopter flights, Queensland Police Service POLAIR flights, No. 219 Squadron of the Australian Air Force Cadets and still in their original hangar, the Royal Queensland Aero Club.

== Heritage listings ==
Archerfield Airport has a number of heritage-listed sites, including:

- Archerfield Airport terminal building and passenger lounge, Grenier Road (27.5716°S 153.0121°E)
- Archerfield Second World War Igloos Complex, 98–138 Kerry Road (27.5737°S 153.0196°E)

== See also ==
- List of airports in Queensland
