= God's Acre Cemetery =

Cemetery in Brisbane, Queensland, Australia

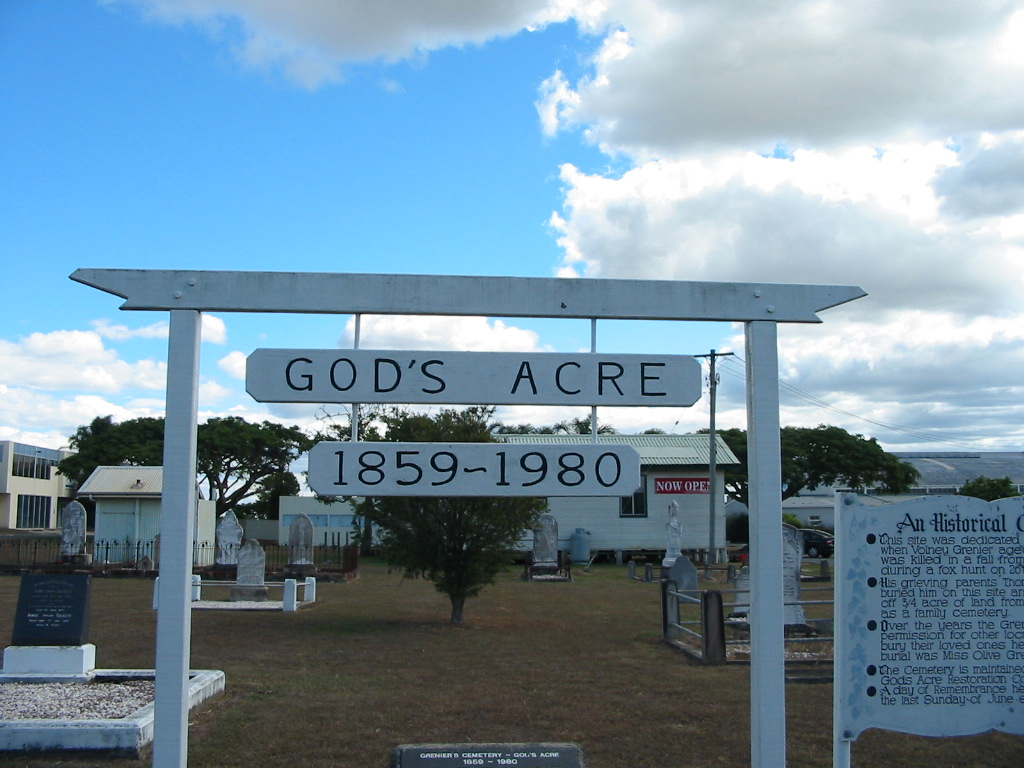
- God's Acre Cemetery, 2005
- Interactive map of God's Acre Cemetery

Details
- Established: 1859
- Closed: 1980
- Location: Archerfield, Queensland
- Country: Australia
- Coordinates: 27.5719°S 153.0138°E
- Owned by: Federal Airports Corporation leased by Brisbane City Council
- Size: 3 roods
- Find a Grave: God's Acre Cemetery

God's Acre Cemetery is a heritage-listed cemetery in front of Archerfield Airport, along Beatty Road, between Kerry & Mortimer Roads, Archerfield, Brisbane, Queensland, Australia. It is also known as Grenier's Burial Ground, Coopers Plains Cemetery and Oxley Cemetery.

== History ==
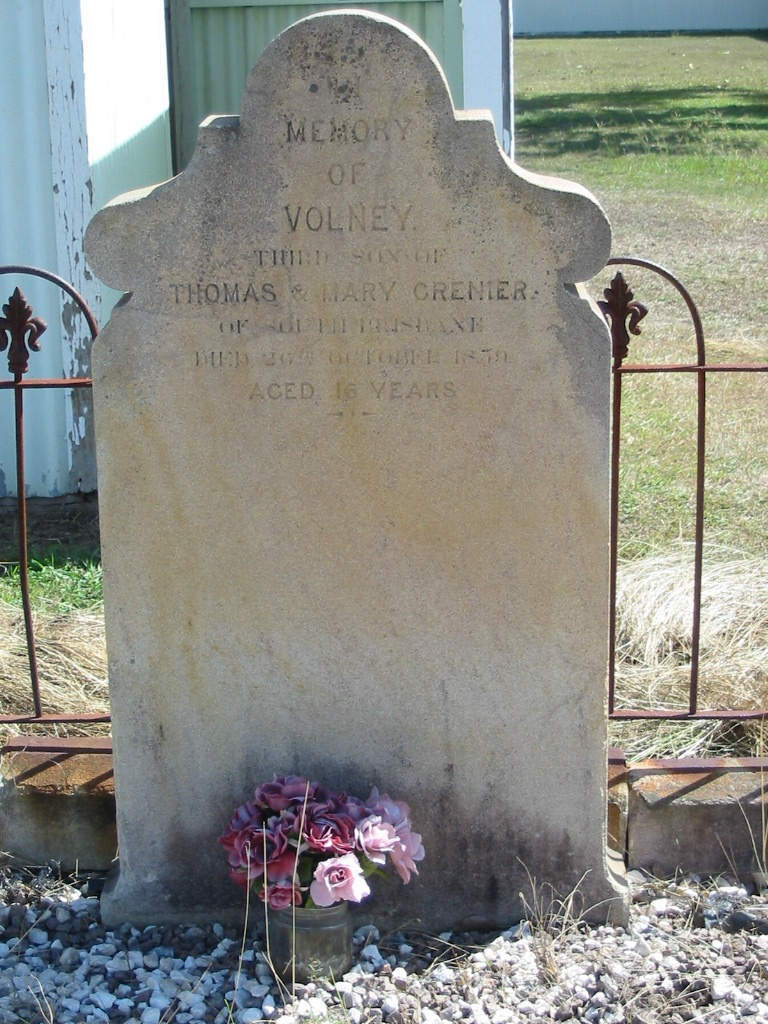
Headstone for Volney Grenier, first burial in the cemetery

God's Acre Cemetery was established in 1859 by Thomas Grenier as a burial place when his son Volney Grenier, aged 16, was killed in a fall from his horse. Yeerongpilly Shire Council took control of the cemetery in 1924, and subsequently Brisbane City Council in 1925. The cemetery was surrounded by the Archerfield Airport from the late 1920s. The Federal Airports Corporation now owns the land, but is leased by the Brisbane City Council.

God's Acre Cemetery is listed on the Brisbane Heritage Register.
