= Adam Walker (Australian politician) =

Australian politician

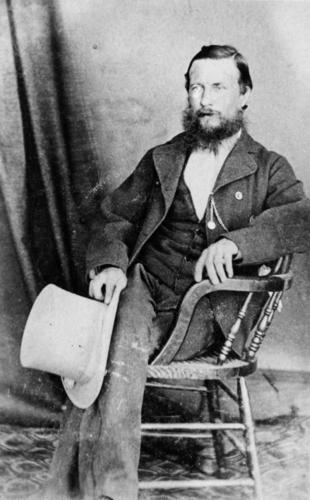

Member of the Queensland Legislative Assembly for Balonne
- In office 1 December 1873 – 27 May 1874
- Preceded by: New seat
- Succeeded by: Jacob Low

Personal details
- Born: Adam Walker; 1829 London, England
- Died: 1902 (aged 72–73) Sydney, New South Wales, Australia
- Occupation: Builder

Adam Walker (1829 – 15 August 1902) was a Member of the Queensland Legislative Assembly in Australia. He represented the seat of Balonne from 1873 to 1874.

Parliament of Queensland
New seat	Member for Balonne; 1873–1874	Succeeded by Jacob Low
