= Archerfield, Queensland =

Archerfield
- Suburb
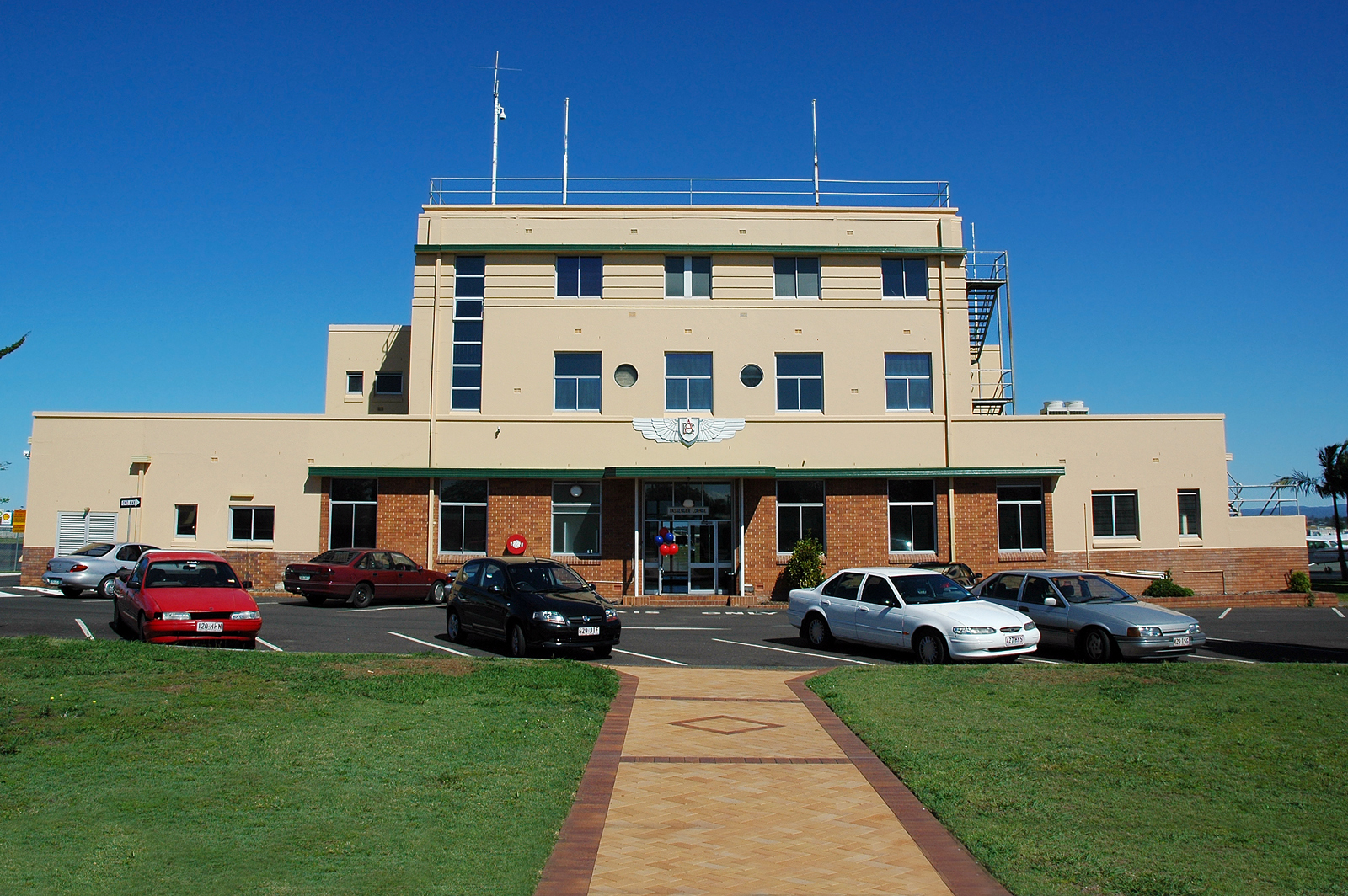
- Archerfield Airport terminal, 2007

- Interactive map of Archerfield
- Coordinates: 27.5711°S 153.0077°E
- Country: Australia
- State: Queensland
- City: Brisbane
- LGA: City of Brisbane (Moorooka Ward)
- Location: 15.4 km (9.6 mi) S of Brisbane CBD

Government
  - State electorate: Algester
  - Federal division: Moreton

Area
  - Total: 4.4 km^{2} (1.7 sq mi)

Population
  - Total: 533 (2021 census)
  - Density: 121.1/km^{2} (314/sq mi)
- Time zone: UTC+10:00 (AEST)
- Postcode: 4108
Suburbs around Archerfield
Rocklea	Rocklea	Coopers Plains
Rocklea	Archerfield	Coopers Plains
Willawong	Acacia Ridge	Acacia Ridge

Archerfield is a mixed-use southern suburb in the City of Brisbane, Queensland, Australia. In the 2021 census, Archerfield had a population of 533 people.

== Geography ==
Archerfield is bounded by Oxley Creek to the west and by Beaudesert Road to the east.

Archerfield is a sparsely populated suburb, with most of the land being occupied by Archerfield Airport in the centre and south-west of the suburb (27.570°S 153.013°E). Most of the rest of the suburb is industrial except for two residential areas, one in the north of the suburb and one in the east.

=== Climate ===
On 8 August 1995, as southern Queensland experienced a severe cold snap, a temperature of 0 degrees was recorded in Archerfield.

Climate data for ARCHERFIELD AIRPORT
Month	Jan	Feb	Mar	Apr	May	Jun	Jul	Aug	Sep	Oct	Nov	Dec	Year
Record high °C (°F)	43.5 (110.3)	41.8 (107.2)	40.2 (104.4)	34.9 (94.8)	31.3 (88.3)	28.9 (84.0)	29.2 (84.6)	36.3 (97.3)	37.8 (100.0)	39.4 (102.9)	42.1 (107.8)	41.2 (106.2)	43.5 (110.3)
Mean daily maximum °C (°F)	30.8 (87.4)	30.3 (86.5)	29.3 (84.7)	27.1 (80.8)	24.3 (75.7)	21.8 (71.2)	21.7 (71.1)	23.2 (73.8)	25.9 (78.6)	27.4 (81.3)	28.8 (83.8)	29.8 (85.6)	26.7 (80.1)
Mean daily minimum °C (°F)	20.8 (69.4)	20.5 (68.9)	18.8 (65.8)	15.4 (59.7)	12.0 (53.6)	9.7 (49.5)	8.1 (46.6)	8.3 (46.9)	11.7 (53.1)	14.8 (58.6)	17.5 (63.5)	19.3 (66.7)	14.7 (58.5)
Record low °C (°F)	13.7 (56.7)	14.2 (57.6)	10.1 (50.2)	5.3 (41.5)	1.1 (34.0)	−0.8 (30.6)	−2.5 (27.5)	−1.8 (28.8)	−0.4 (31.3)	4.2 (39.6)	7.2 (45.0)	9.8 (49.6)	−2.5 (27.5)
Average precipitation mm (inches)	118.6 (4.67)	138.7 (5.46)	100.3 (3.95)	51.9 (2.04)	77.1 (3.04)	57.1 (2.25)	25.8 (1.02)	34.8 (1.37)	28.0 (1.10)	71.0 (2.80)	90.2 (3.55)	122.3 (4.81)	915.6 (36.05)
Average precipitation days	10.9	12.8	13.1	9.6	9.2	9.1	6.7	6.1	6.8	8.9	9.7	11.0	113.9
Average relative humidity (%)	56	58	55	52	51	52	45	42	45	50	53	55	51

== History ==
Archerfield was named after the 14,000-acre Archerfield pastoral station, acquired in 1881 by Michael Durack b 1846 - 1894, an Australian pastoralist and pioneer.

The Grenier family of South Brisbane came from New Zealand to Brisbane in 1845 and, while operating the Grenier Inn at South Brisbane, also farmed land known as "The Willows" with the God's Acre Cemetery being established for Grenier family burials.

In 1931, Archerfield Airport was established as the major airport for Brisbane on the site of "The Willows". The old civil terminal is still in existence on the eastern side of the airfield with the cemetery in front of it. During World War II, the airfield served as a base for military flying operations in support of the war in the Pacific.

== Demographics ==
Historical population
Year	Pop.	±%
2001	576	—
2006	580	+0.7%
2011	510	−12.1%
2016	544	+6.7%
2021	533	−2.0%

In the 2011 census, the population of Archerfield was 510. The median age of the Archerfield population was 37 years of age, the same as the median nationally. 64.5% of people living in Archerfield were born in Australia, slightly less than the national average of 69.8%. The other top responses for country of birth were India 3%, England 2.4%, Philippines 2.2%, New Zealand 2.2%, Fiji 2%. 67.4% of people spoke only English at home; the next most popular languages were 4.2% Vietnamese, 2.2% Samoan, 2% Hindi, 1.8% Gujarati, 1.8% Greek.

In the 2016 census, Archerfield had a population of 544 people.

In the 2021 census, there were 533 people in Archerfield. 64.2% of people were born in Australia. The next most common countries of birth were the Philippines 3.0%, Vietnam 2.8%, Afghanistan 1.9%, Nepal 1.7% and New Zealand 1.5%. 66.2% of people only spoke English at home. Other languages spoken at home included Vietnamese 3.2%, Spanish 2.1%, Hindi and Samoan, both 1.9%, and Greet 1.7%. The most common responses for religion were No Religion 35.8%, Catholic 19.3%, Anglican 8.6% and Islam 4.9%. The median age stood at 39, one year above both Queensland's and Australia's national average.

== Heritage listings ==
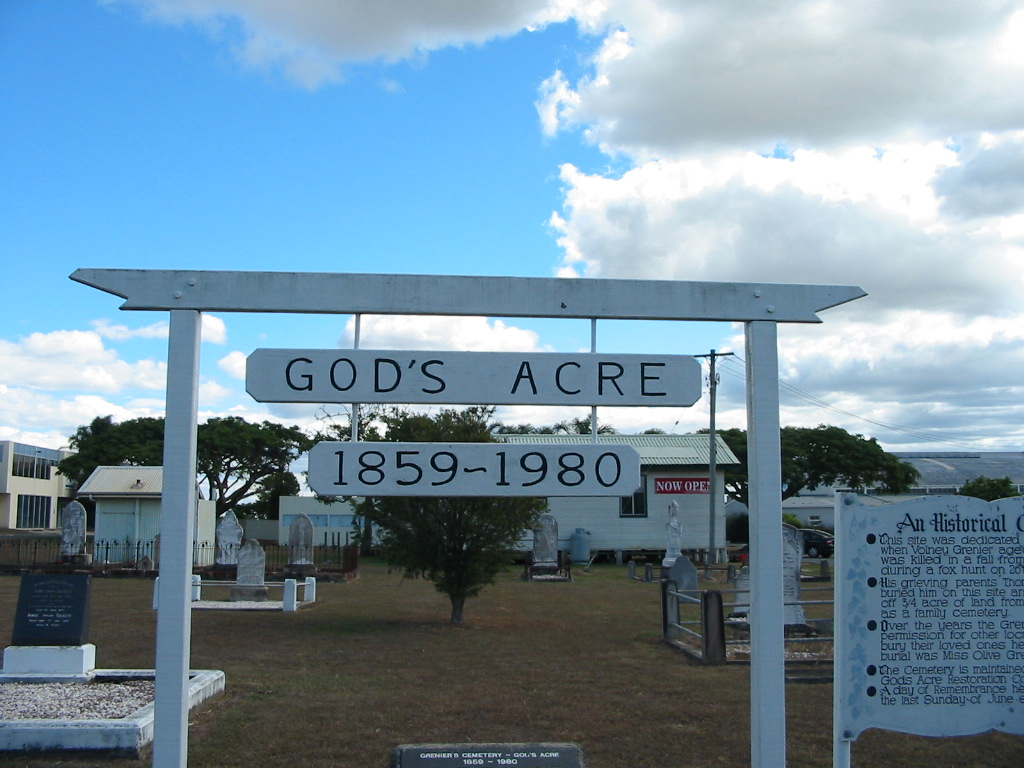
God's Acre Cemetery, 2005

Archerfield has a number of heritage-listed sites, including:

- God's Acre Cemetery, Beatty Road (in front of Archerfield Airport, 27.5719°S 153.0138°E)
- Archerfield Airport terminal building and passenger lounge, Grenier Road (27.5716°S 153.0121°E)
- Archerfield Second World War Igloos Complex, 98–138 Kerry Road (27.5737°S 153.0196°E)

== Education ==
There are no schools in Archerfield. The nearest government primary schools are Rocklea State School in neighbouring Rocklea to the north, Coopers Plains State School in neighbouring Coopers Plains to the east, and Acacia Ridge State School in neighbouring Acacia Ridge to the south. The nearest government secondary schools are Sunnybank State High School in Sunnybank to the east and Yeronga State High School in Yeronga to the north.

== Amenities ==
Despite its name, the Archerfield Wetlands is a 150-hectare (370-acre) greenspace precinct within the neighbouring suburbs of Durack, Willawong, Rocklea, and Oxley in the Oxley Creek corridor. It borders the Archerfield Airport. The main entry point to the wetlands is via the Archerfield Wetlands District Park at 455 Bowhill Road, Durack. The district park replaces the former Inala wastewater treatment plant and has a number of indoor and outdoor community spaces, playgrounds with water features, and picnic and barbeque facilities. It is also the start of a number of walking and cycling trails through the larger wetlands.
