= Eddie Beardmore =

Australian politician

Eddie Beardmore MBE
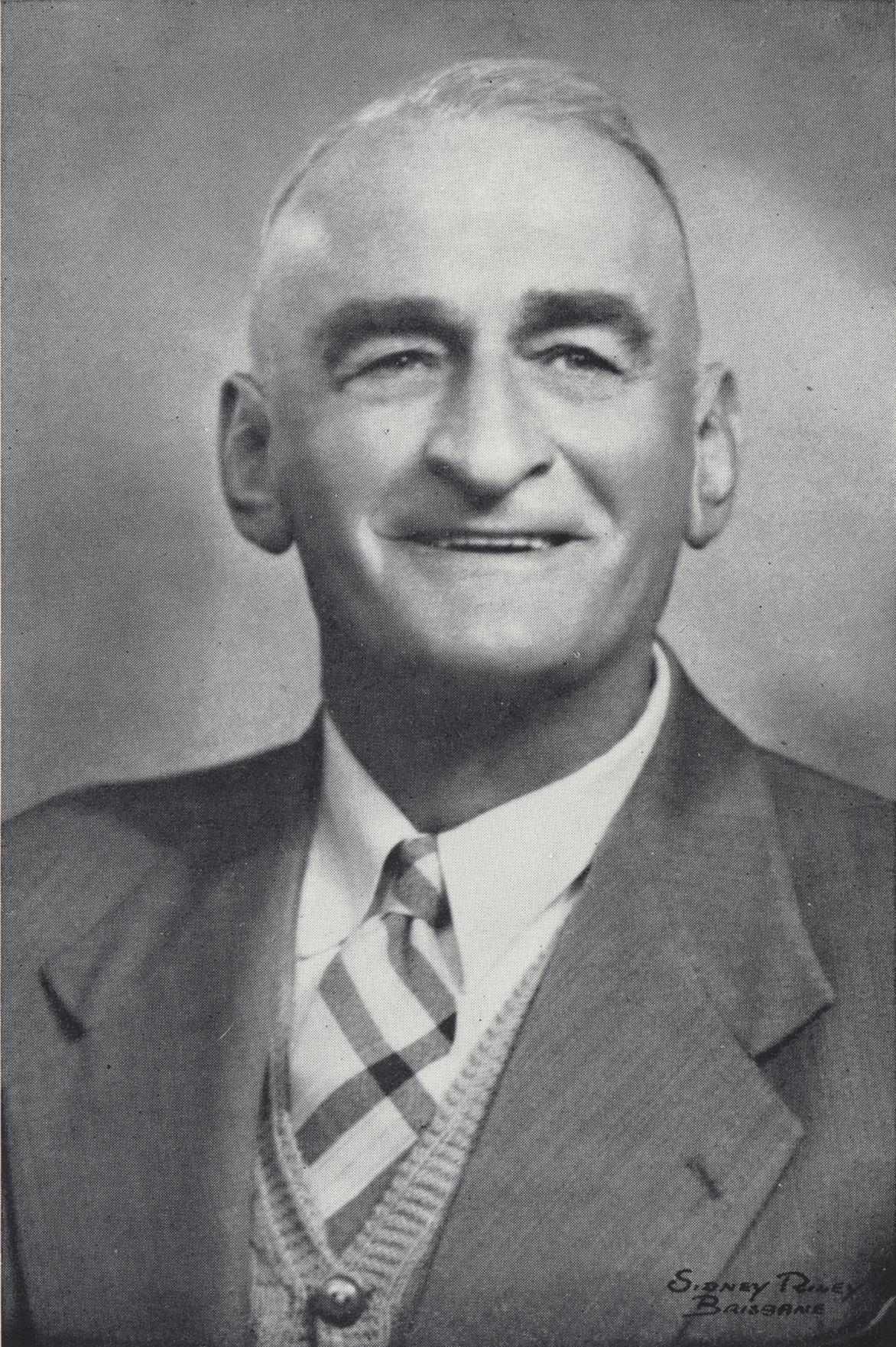

Member of the Queensland Legislative Assembly for Balonne
- In office 3 August 1957 – 17 May 1969
- Preceded by: John Taylor
- Succeeded by: Harold Hungerford

Personal details
- Born: Edward James Beardmore; 18 January 1891 Winton, Victoria, Australia
- Died: 8 April 1985 (aged 94) Brisbane, Queensland, Australia
- Party: Country Party
- Occupation: Grazier

Edwin James (Eddie) Beardmore MBE (1891–1985) was a politician in Queensland, Australia. He was a Member of the Queensland Legislative Assembly.

== Politics ==
Beardmore was a member of the Balonne Shire Council for 15 years, being deputy chairman for 8 years.

A member of the Country Party, Beardmore was elected to the Queensland Legislative Assembly at the 1957 election in the electoral district of Balonne. He retained the seat at the 1960, 1963 and 1966 elections. In 1969, he was in a serious car accident and did not contest the election later that year, ending his political service.

Parliament of Queensland
| Preceded by John Taylor | Member for Balonne; 1957–1969 | Succeeded by Harold Hungerford |
