= Harold Hungerford =

Australian politician

Member of the Queensland Legislative Assembly for Balonne
- In office 17 May 1969 – 10 January 1972
- Preceded by: Edwin Beardmore
- Succeeded by: Don Neal

Personal details
- Born: Harold Mortimer Hungerford; 18 December 1908 Lismore, New South Wales, Australia
- Died: 10 January 1972 (aged 63) Brisbane, Queensland, Australia
- Party: Country Party
- Spouse: Sheila Joan Valentine Wilson (m.1939 d.1972)
- Occupation: Sheep farmer, Legal clerk

Harold Mortimer Hungerford (18 December 1908 – 10 January 1972 ) was a Member of the Queensland Legislative Assembly. He represented the seat of Balonne from 1969 to 1972.

Hungerford in office in 1972.

Parliament of Queensland
Preceded by Edwin Beardmore	Member for Balonne; 1969–1972	Succeeded by Don Neal
