= Jacob Low (squatter-legislator) =

Australian politician

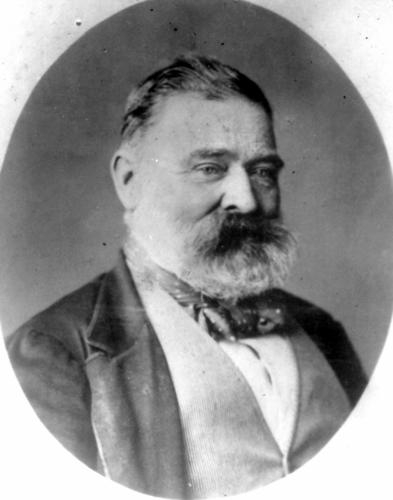

Member of the Queensland Legislative Assembly for Balonne
- In office 25 May 1874 – 5 October 1883
- Preceded by: Adam Walker
- Succeeded by: Boyd Morehead

Personal details
- Born: Jacob Low; 1807 Blairgowrie, Perthshire, Scotland
- Died: 1883 (aged 75–76) Brisbane, Queensland, Australia
- Resting place: Toowong Cemetery
- Occupation: Articled clerk

Jacob Low (1807 – 14 September 1883) was an articled clerk turned pastoralist who served as a Member of the Queensland Legislative Assembly in Australia.

== Background ==
Born in 1807 in Blairgowrie, Perthshire, Low became an articled clerk. In 1846, as a squatter he took up Welltown Station near Goondiwindi, and later acquired Glenearn Cattle Station in Maranoa.

== Assembly ==
He represented the seat of Balonne from 25 May 1874 (the election of Adam Walker, the previous member for Balonne, was voided, and Low was appointed in his place) to 14 September 1883, when he died in office. He declared no party affiliation. During debates, Low said that while he had a reputation for protecting Aboriginal Australians from settler violence in the region, he had 'killed many blacks himself', but went on to assert that settlers' private vigilante raids on aboriginal encampments were responsible for 'more bloodshed' than the Native Police who were being blamed.

Low died 14 September 1883 while up for re-election, and was buried in Toowong Cemetery.

Parliament of Queensland
Preceded by Adam Walker	Member for Balonne; 1874–1883	Succeeded by Boyd Morehead
