= Don Neal =

Australian politician

Member of the Queensland Legislative Assembly for Balonne
- In office 27 May 1972 – 19 September 1992
- Preceded by: Harold Hungerford
- Succeeded by: Seat abolished

Personal details
- Born: Donald McConnell Neal; 31 May 1939 (age 86) Jandowae, Queensland, Australia
- Party: Country Party/National Party
- Occupation: Grazier, Wool classer

Donald McConnell Neal (born 31 May 1939) was an Australian politician.

He was born in Jandowae, Queensland to Donald McKenzie Neal and Christina Elizabeth, née Schutt. After attending Cabawin State School and Brisbane Technical College, he became a wool classer and grazier. On 5 September 1964 he married Frances Lillian Nelson, with whom he had six children. A member of the Country Party, he was secretary and campaign director for the Balonne Electorate Council from 1966 to 1971 and a member of the central council of the Young National Party from 1972.

In 1972, Neal was elected to the Queensland Legislative Assembly as the member for Balonne. In 1980 he was appointed Government Whip, winning a promotion to Minister for Corrective Services, Administrative Services and Valuation in 1986. In 1987 he was moved to Water Resources and Maritime Services. Following the Nationals' loss at the election in 1989, he became Opposition Whip in 1990 but retired from politics in 1992.

Parliament of Queensland
Preceded by Harold Hungerford	Member for Balonne; 1972–1992	Abolished
