= Electoral district of Balonne =

Former state electoral district of Queensland, Australia

Balonne Queensland—Legislative Assembly
- State: Queensland
- Dates current: 1873–1932, 1950–1992
- Namesake: Balonne River
- Demographic: Rural
- Coordinates: 28°20′S 148°20′E

Balonne was an electoral district of the Legislative Assembly in the Australian state of Queensland from 1873 to 1932, and again from 1950 to 1992. It was named after the Balonne River.

Balonne was generally centered on the inland rural towns of St George and Dirranbandi.

Balonne was abolished in the 1991 redistribution, and was distributed between the new electorate of Western Downs and the existing district of Warrego.

== Members for Balonne ==
First incarnation (1873–1932)
Member	Party	Term
Adam Walker		1873–1874
Jacob Low		1874–1883
Boyd Morehead	Ministerialist	1883–1896
George Story	Ministerialist	1896–1904
Edward Land	Labor	1904–1927
Samuel Brassington	Labor	1927–1932
Second incarnation (1950–1992)
John Taylor	Labor	1950–1957
Eddie Beardmore	Country	1957–1969
Harold Hungerford	Country	1969–1972
Don Neal	Country	1972–1974
Don Neal	National	1974–1992

== See also ==
- Electoral districts of Queensland
- Members of the Queensland Legislative Assembly by year
- Category:Members of the Queensland Legislative Assembly by name
