= John Taylor (Australian politician) =

Australian politician, Member of the Queensland Legislative Assembly 1944–1957

Member of the Queensland Legislative Assembly for Maranoa
- In office 15 April 1944 – 29 April 1950
- Preceded by: Charles Conroy
- Succeeded by: Seat abolished

Member of the Queensland Legislative Assembly for Balonne
- In office 29 April 1950 – 3 August 1957
- Preceded by: New seat
- Succeeded by: Edwin Beardmore

Personal details
- Born: John Russell Taylor; 1908 Wave Hill, Western Australia, Australia
- Died: 1961 (aged 52–53) Brisbane, Queensland, Australia
- Resting place: Lutwyche Cemetery
- Party: Labor
- Spouse: Edna Mary Waugh (m.1938 d.1997)
- Occupation: Shearer, Trade union organiser

John Russell Taylor (c. 1908 – 26 March 1961) was a Member of the Queensland Legislative Assembly. He represented the seats of Maranoa from 1944 to 1950 and Balonne from 1950 to 1957.

Taylor died in 1961 while attending his daughter's wedding and was buried in Lutwyche Cemetery.

Parliament of Queensland
Preceded by Charles Conroy	Member for Maranoa; 1944–1950	Abolished
New seat	Member for Balonne; 1950–1957	Succeeded by Edwin Beardmore
