= Federal Airports Corporation =

Former Australian government agency

The Federal Airports Corporation (FAC) was a business enterprise of the Government of Australia responsible for the operation of major passenger airports in Australia. It was established by the Hawke government by an act of parliament in 1987 and commenced operation in January 1988, taking over control from the airports division of the Department of Aviation.

Discussion of the privatisation of airport operation in Australia commenced in the early 1990s. In April 1994, the Keating government announced that all airports operated by FAC would be privatised in several phases. Melbourne Airport, for example, was to be included in the first phase. A firm decision was made in 1996 by the Howard government that each airport would be leased to an individual operator for 50 years, with an option for a 49-year extension. Airport divestment was initiated in 1997 with the leasing of Melbourne, Brisbane and Perth Airports, followed by Adelaide, Canberra and Gold Coast airports, the remaining smaller airports in 1998, Sydney Airport in 2002, and the Sydney Basin airports of Bankstown, Camden and Hoxton Park in 2003.

At the beginning of 1997 the FAC operated 22 airports and handled over 60 million passenger annually. Melbourne Airport was leased to a newly formed Australia Pacific Airports Corporation for $1.3 billion, with the transfer being completed on 30 June 1997. Brisbane Airport was leased for $1.4 billion to Brisbane Airport Corporation. Australia Pacific Airports Corporation also obtained a 90% stake in Launceston Airport for $19 million on 29 May 1998, with the Launceston City Council owning the remaining 10%. Perth Airport was leased to the Australian Development Group in 1997.

By 30 June 1998 all significant assets and liabilities of the FAC were transferred to the new airport lessee companies. The FAC continued airport operations until 24 September 1998 and the transfer of residual assets and liabilities to the federal government was not completed until 8 September 1999. Sydney Airport Corporation acquired the lease for Sydney Airport in 2002.

At present the primary responsibility of the Airports Branch of the Department of Infrastructure, Transport, Regional Development, Communications, Sport and the Arts is the regulation of 21 leased federal airports on Commonwealth land. The branch administers the Airports Act 1996, its associated regulations and the airport head leases.
