= Results of the 1938 Queensland state election =

Queensland state election, 2 April 1938 Legislative Assembly << 1935–1941 >>
Enrolled voters	582,711^{[1]}				
Votes cast	539,037		Turnout	92.51%	–0.19
Informal votes	7,058		Informal	1.31%	–0.43
Summary of votes by party
Party	Primary votes	%	Swing	Seats	Change
Labor	250,943	47.17%	–6.26	44	– 2
Country	120,469	22.65%	·	13	·
United Australia	74,328	13.97%	·	4	·
Protestant Labour	46,568	8.75%	+8.75%	1	+ 1
Social Credit	27,758	5.22%	–1.80%	0	± 0
Communist	8,510	1.60%	+0.28	0	± 0
Independent	3,403	0.64%	–2.73	0	± 0
Total	531,979			62	

This is a list of electoral district results for the 1938 Queensland state election.

At the time, the voting system in Queensland was based on contingency voting, which was similar to the modern optional preferential voting system. In electorates with 3 or more candidates, preferences were not distributed if a candidate received more than 50% of the primary vote.

If none received more than 50%, all except the top two candidates were eliminated from the count and their preferences distributed between the two leaders, with the one receiving the most votes declared the winner.

== Results by electoral district ==
=== Albert ===
1938 Queensland state election: Albert
Party	Candidate	Votes	%	±%
Country	Tom Plunkett	3,713	40.5	−13.0
Labor	John Bray	2,622	28.6	+28.6
Protestant Labour	Robert Elliott	1,542	16.8	+16.8
Social Credit	George Gray	1,289	14.1	−32.4
Total formal votes		9,166	99.0	+1.9
Informal votes		95	1.0	−1.9
Turnout		9,261	92.4	+1.0
Two-party-preferred result
Country	Tom Plunkett	4,195	54.9	+1.4
Labor	John Bray	3,446	45.1	+45.1
Country hold		Swing	N/A	

=== Aubigny ===
1938 Queensland state election: Aubigny
Party	Candidate	Votes	%	±%
Country	Arthur Moore	5,408	65.7	−34.3
Labor	James Strofeld	1,976	24.0	+24.0
Independent	Hermann Wrembeck	844	10.3	+10.3
Total formal votes		8,228	98.9	
Informal votes		91	1.1	
Turnout		8,319	92.6	
Country hold		Swing	N/A	

- Preferences were not distributed.

=== Barcoo ===
1938 Queensland state election: Barcoo
Party	Candidate	Votes	%	±%
Labor	Frank Bulcock	unopposed		
Labor hold		Swing		

=== Baroona ===
1938 Queensland state election: Baroona
Party	Candidate	Votes	%	±%
Labor	Bill Power	4,571	49.6	−19.6
Protestant Labour	Ralph Powell	2,539	27.6	+27.6
United Australia	Edwyn Roper	2,103	22.8	+22.8
Total formal votes		9,213	98.7	+2.4
Informal votes		123	1.3	−2.4
Turnout		9,336	92.4	+2.7
Two-candidate-preferred result
Labor	Bill Power	4,736	57.7	−11.5
Protestant Labour	Ralph Powell	3,478	42.3	+42.3
Labor hold		Swing	N/A	

=== Bowen ===
1938 Queensland state election: Bowen
Party	Candidate	Votes	%	±%
Labor	Ernest Riordan	3,098	39.2	−13.4
Communist	Fred Paterson	2,319	29.3	+13.7
Country	Ernest Forde	2,135	27.0	−2.4
Social Credit	Henry Beck	355	4.5	+4.5
Total formal votes		7,907	99.2	+0.7
Informal votes		62	0.8	−0.7
Turnout		7,969	94.6	+0.7
Two-candidate-preferred result
Labor	Ernest Riordan	3,308	56.2	
Communist	Fred Paterson	2,579	43.8	
Labor hold		Swing	N/A	

=== Bremer ===
1938 Queensland state election: Bremer
Party	Candidate	Votes	%	±%
Labor	Frank Cooper	7,099	83.4	−4.1
Communist	Geordie Burns	1,414	16.6	+4.1
Total formal votes		8,513	96.9	−0.5
Informal votes		276	3.1	+0.5
Turnout		8,789	95.0	+0.4
Labor hold		Swing	−4.1	

=== Brisbane ===
1938 Queensland state election: Brisbane
Party	Candidate	Votes	%	±%
Labor	Johnno Mann	5,704	66.0	+1.6
United Australia	Benjamin White	2,933	34.0	+34.0
Total formal votes		8,637	98.3	+1.1
Informal votes		146	1.7	−1.1
Turnout		8,637	88.2	+3.9
Labor hold		Swing	N/A	

=== Bulimba ===
1938 Queensland state election: Bulimba
Party	Candidate	Votes	%	±%
Labor	George Marriott	5,847	59.8	−7.0
United Australia	Robert Larmar	2,132	21.8	−5.3
Social Credit	Julius Streeter	1,221	12.5	+12.5
Independent	Bernard Dent	577	5.9	+5.9
Total formal votes		9,777	97.6	−0.8
Informal votes		240	2.4	+0.8
Turnout		10,017	95.4	+0.4
Labor hold		Swing	N/A	

- Preferences were not distributed.

=== Bundaberg ===
1938 Queensland state election: Bundaberg
Party	Candidate	Votes	%	±%
Labor	Bernard McLean	4,356	44.1	−8.3
Country	Laurence Scotney	2,393	24.2	+10.1
Social Credit	Henry Clegton	1,699	17.2	−16.3
Protestant Labour	Ernest Miles	1,439	14.6	−18.9
Total formal votes		9,887	99.2	−0.1
Informal votes		83	0.8	+0.1
Turnout		9,970	95.5	−1.2
Two-party-preferred result
Labor	Bernard McLean	4,694	59.1	
Country	Laurence Scotney	3,247	40.9	
Labor hold		Swing	N/A	

=== Buranda ===
1938 Queensland state election: Buranda
Party	Candidate	Votes	%	±%
Labor	Ted Hanson	5,168	50.9	−13.3
United Australia	Hector Annat	2,432	23.9	−3.0
Protestant Labour	Joseph Webster	2,202	21.7	+21.7
Social Credit	Harold Tapper	358	3.5	−5.5
Total formal votes		10,160	98.5	−0.2
Informal votes		155	1.5	+0.2
Turnout		10,315	94.1	+0.8
Labor hold		Swing	N/A	

- Preferences were not distributed.

=== Cairns ===
1938 Queensland state election: Cairns
Party	Candidate	Votes	%	±%
Labor	John O'Keefe	4,597	56.3	−13.0
Country	William Chapman	1,830	22.4	+22.4
Protestant Labour	Robert Smith	1,740	21.3	+21.3
Total formal votes		8,167	98.8	+0.7
Informal votes		99	1.2	−0.7
Turnout		8,266	90.6	+0.4
Labor hold		Swing	N/A	

- Preferences were not distributed.

=== Carnarvon ===
1938 Queensland state election: Carnarvon
Party	Candidate	Votes	%	±%
Labor	Paul Hilton	4,514	56.2	+3.4
Country	John Leahy	3,515	43.8	+4.3
Total formal votes		8,029	99.3	+0.1
Informal votes		55	0.7	−0.1
Turnout		8,084	91.6	−0.3
Labor hold		Swing	N/A	

=== Carpentaria ===
1938 Queensland state election: Carpentaria
Party	Candidate	Votes	%	±%
Labor	John Mullan	3,501	55.8	−44.2
Country	James Boyd	2,775	44.2	+44.2
Total formal votes		6,276	98.8	
Informal votes		75	1.2	
Turnout		6,351	79.8	
Labor hold		Swing	N/A	

=== Charters Towers ===
1938 Queensland state election: Charters Towers
Party	Candidate	Votes	%	±%
Labor	William Wellington	unopposed		
Labor hold		Swing		

==== By-election ====
- This by-election was caused by the death of William Wellington. It was held on 27 May 1939.

1939 Charters Towers state by-election
Party	Candidate	Votes	%	±%
Labor	Arthur Jones	2,925	44.9	−55.1
Protestant Labour	William Hocking	1,689	25.9	+25.9
Country	Robert Smith	1,637	25.1	+25.1
Independent	William Millett	265	4.1	+4.1
Total formal votes		6,516	99.3	
Informal votes		44	0.7	
Turnout		6,560	84.7	
Two-candidate-preferred result
Labor	Arthur Jones	3,073	58.6	−41.4
Protestant Labour	William Hocking	2,170	41.4	+41.4
Labor hold		Swing	N/A	

=== Cook ===
1938 Queensland state election: Cook
Party	Candidate	Votes	%	±%
Labor	Harold Collins	4,485	59.0	+5.3
Country	George Weaver	2,574	33.8	+7.8
Social Credit	Joseph Mears	547	7.2	−13.1
Total formal votes		7,606	98.0	−0.4
Informal votes		157	2.0	+0.4
Turnout		7,763	90.4	−0.3
Labor hold		Swing	N/A	

- Preferences were not distributed.

=== Cooroora ===
1938 Queensland state election: Cooroora
Party	Candidate	Votes	%	±%
Country	Harry Walker	5,353	59.5	−7.1
Labor	Andrew Thompson	2,283	25.4	+25.4
Social Credit	Denis Hannay	1,364	15.1	+15.1
Total formal votes		9,000	98.9	+0.8
Informal votes		100	1.1	−0.8
Turnout		9,100	94.4	+0.7
Country hold		Swing	N/A	

- Preferences were not distributed.

=== Cunningham ===
1938 Queensland state election: Cunningham
Party	Candidate	Votes	%	±%
Country	William Deacon	unopposed		
Country hold		Swing		

=== Dalby ===
1938 Queensland state election: Dalby
Party	Candidate	Votes	%	±%
Labor	Aubrey Slessar	4,661	50.3	+2.1
Country	Godfrey Morgan	4,604	49.7	−2.1
Total formal votes		9,265	98.9	−0.1
Informal votes		102	1.1	+0.1
Turnout		9,367	91.7	−1.4
Labor gain from Country		Swing	+2.1	

=== East Toowoomba ===
1938 Queensland state election: East Toowoomba
Party	Candidate	Votes	%	±%
Labor	James Kane	3,831	45.4	−9.0
Country	Herbert Yeates	2,626	31.1	−14.5
Ind. United Australia	James Annand	1,986	23.5	+23.5
Total formal votes		8,443	98.6	+0.1
Informal votes		120	1.4	−0.1
Turnout		8,563	90.1	−2.4
Two-party-preferred result
Country	Herbert Yeates	4,198	51.3	+5.7
Labor	James Kane	3,977	48.7	−5.7
Country gain from Labor		Swing	+5.7	

=== Enoggera ===
1938 Queensland state election: Enoggera
Party	Candidate	Votes	%	±%
Labor	George Taylor	5,689	54.7	−14.3
Protestant Labour	James Underhill	2,390	23.0	+23.0
United Australia	Robert Gardiner	2,326	22.3	−8.7
Total formal votes		10,405	99.2	+0.8
Informal votes		83	0.8	−0.8
Turnout		10,488	94.9	+1.0
Labor hold		Swing	N/A	

- Preferences were not distributed.

=== Fassifern ===
1938 Queensland state election: Fassifern
Party	Candidate	Votes	%	±%
Country	Alf Muller	6,086	67.3	+5.2
Labor	John Holman	2,951	32.7	−5.2
Total formal votes		9,037	98.6	−0.3
Informal votes		124	1.4	+0.3
Turnout		9,161	94.7	+0.3
Country hold		Swing	+5.2	

=== Fitzroy ===
1938 Queensland state election: Fitzroy
Party	Candidate	Votes	%	±%
Labor	Jim Clark	5,222	55.0	−8.3
Country	Edwin Hiskens	3,616	38.1	+1.5
Social Credit	Sidney Cooper	650	6.9	+6.9
Total formal votes		9,488	99.4	+0.9
Informal votes		57	0.6	−0.9
Turnout		9,545	93.4	−0.9
Labor hold		Swing	N/A	

- Preferences were not distributed.

=== Fortitude Valley ===
1938 Queensland state election: Fortitude Valley
Party	Candidate	Votes	%	±%
Labor	Samuel Brassington	5,136	56.4	−15.9
United Australia	William Boden	2,492	27.4	+2.3
Protestant Labour	Andrew Knox	1,476	16.2	+16.2
Total formal votes		9,104	98.7	−0.2
Informal votes		118	1.3	+0.2
Turnout		9,222	93.3	+0.2
Labor hold		Swing	N/A	

- Preferences were not distributed.

=== Gregory ===
1938 Queensland state election: Gregory
Party	Candidate	Votes	%	±%
Labor	George Pollock	3,785	64.9	−35.1
Country	Edward Phillott	2,045	35.1	+35.1
Total formal votes		5,830	97.9	
Informal votes		125	2.1	
Turnout		5,955	81.4	
Labor hold		Swing	N/A	

==== By-election ====
- This by-election was caused by the death of George Pollock. It was held on 27 May 1939.

1939 Gregory state by-election
Party	Candidate	Votes	%	±%
Independent	Charles Brown	2,926	52.9	+52.9
Labor	Vincent Thompson	2,600	47.1	−17.8
Total formal votes		5,526		
Informal votes				
Turnout				
Independent gain from Labor		Swing	N/A	

=== Gympie ===
1938 Queensland state election: Gympie
Party	Candidate	Votes	%	±%
Labor	Thomas Dunstan	3,040	43.0	−13.7
Protestant Labour	William Millett	2,264	32.0	+32.0
Country	Vivian Tozer	1,526	21.6	−21.7
Social Credit	Alfred Taylor	246	3.5	+3.5
Total formal votes		7,076	99.3	+0.2
Informal votes		51	0.7	−0.2
Turnout		7,127	93.7	−0.5
Two-candidate-preferred result
Labor	Thomas Dunstan	3,203	55.3	−1.4
Protestant Labour	William Millett	2,590	44.7	+44.7
Labor hold		Swing	N/A	

=== Hamilton ===
1938 Queensland state election: Hamilton
Party	Candidate	Votes	%	±%
United Australia	Hugh Russell	6,573	68.7	+2.9
Labor	William Pinder	3,001	31.3	−2.9
Total formal votes		9,574	98.7	+0.2
Informal votes		129	1.3	−0.2
Turnout		9,703	94.3	+4.3
United Australia hold		Swing	+2.9	

=== Herbert ===
1938 Queensland state election: Herbert
Party	Candidate	Votes	%	±%
Labor	Percy Pease	4,858	52.9	−10.8
Country	Clarence Page	1,643	17.9	+17.9
Communist	Jack Henry	1,563	17.0	−0.3
Protestant Labour	Ernest Malin	1,121	12.2	+12.2
Total formal votes		9,185	98.4	+0.2
Informal votes		146	1.6	−0.2
Turnout		9,331	87.2	−0.9
Labor hold		Swing	N/A	

- Preferences were not distributed.

==== By-election ====
- This by-election was caused by the death of Percy Pease. It was held on 9 November 1940.

1940 Herbert state by-election
Party	Candidate	Votes	%	±%
Labor	Stephen Theodore	4,839	53.8	+0.9
Country	Alfred Moule	2,472	27.5	+9.6
Independent Socialist	Jack Wells	1,683	18.7	+18.7
Total formal votes		8,994		
Informal votes				
Turnout				
Labor hold		Swing	N/A	

=== Ipswich ===
1938 Queensland state election: Ipswich
Party	Candidate	Votes	%	±%
Labor	David Gledson	6,289	66.0	−34.0
United Australia	Henry Beverley	3,235	34.0	+34.0
Total formal votes		9,524	98.4	
Informal votes		150	1.6	
Turnout		9,674	95.9	
Labor hold		Swing	N/A	

=== Isis ===
1938 Queensland state election: Isis
Party	Candidate	Votes	%	±%
Country	William Brand	5,247	64.7	+6.6
Labor	Ernest Widdup	2,857	35.3	−6.6
Total formal votes		8,104	98.6	+0.1
Informal votes		113	1.4	−0.1
Turnout		8,217	94.7	−0.3
Country hold		Swing	+6.6	

=== Ithaca ===
1938 Queensland state election: Ithaca
Party	Candidate	Votes	%	±%
Labor	Ned Hanlon	5,145	49.9	−50.1
Protestant Labour	George Webb	3,448	33.4	+33.4
United Australia	Kenneth Morris	1,727	16.7	+16.7
Total formal votes		10,320	99.1	
Informal votes		97	0.9	
Turnout		10,417	94.8	
Two-candidate-preferred result
Labor	Ned Hanlon	5,226	52.3	−47.7
Protestant Labour	George Webb	4,770	47.7	+47.7
Labor hold		Swing	N/A	

=== Kelvin Grove ===
1938 Queensland state election: Kelvin Grove
Party	Candidate	Votes	%	±%
Labor	Frank Waters	4,375	42.5	−27.2
Protestant Labour	George Morris	3,684	35.8	+35.8
United Australia	Edgar Ralph	2,229	21.7	−8.6
Total formal votes		10,228	99.5	+1.1
Informal votes		51	0.5	−1.1
Turnout		10,339	95.3	+1.5
Two-candidate-preferred result
Protestant Labour	George Morris	4,779	51.6	+51.6
Labor	Frank Waters	4,479	48.4	−21.3
Protestant Labour gain from Labor		Swing	N/A	

=== Kennedy ===
1938 Queensland state election: Kennedy
Party	Candidate	Votes	%	±%
Labor	Cecil Jesson	5,492	63.8	−0.1
Country	James Kennedy	3,120	36.2	+0.1
Total formal votes		8,612	97.9	+1.1
Informal votes		183	2.1	−1.1
Turnout		8,795	90.1	−1.4
Labor hold		Swing	−0.1	

=== Keppel ===
1938 Queensland state election: Keppel
Party	Candidate	Votes	%	±%
Country	David Daniel	4,391	54.2	+4.8
Social Credit	John Harding	2,484	30.7	+13.1
Independent	John Salmon	1,227	15.1	+15.1
Total formal votes		8,102	98.7	−0.1
Informal votes		125	1.3	+0.1
Turnout		8,227	92.3	−3.0
Country hold		Swing	N/A	

- Preferences were not distributed.

=== Kurilpa ===
1938 Queensland state election: Kurilpa
Party	Candidate	Votes	%	±%
Labor	Kerry Copley	4,545	46.8	−17.1
United Australia	John Pringle	2,437	25.5	−5.7
Protestant Labour	Joseph Moore	2,313	24.0	+24.0
Communist	Alec MacDonald	426	4.4	+4.4
Total formal votes		9,721	98.6	+0.3
Informal votes		133	1.4	−0.3
Turnout		9,854	91.3	−0.6
Two-party-preferred result
Labor	Kerry Copley	4,960	56.1	
United Australia	John Pringle	3,880	43.9	
Labor hold		Swing	N/A	

=== Logan ===
1938 Queensland state election: Logan
Party	Candidate	Votes	%	±%
Labor	John Brown	5,320	49.6	−11.4
United Australia	Allan Trotter	3,451	32.2	−6.8
Protestant Labour	John Becconsall	1,746	16.3	+16.3
Independent	Mary DeMattos	209	2.0	+2.0
Total formal votes		10,726	98.3	+0.2
Informal votes		182	1.7	−0.2
Turnout		10,908	94.2	−0.2
Two-party-preferred result
Labor	John Brown	4,671	55.8	−5.2
United Australia	Allan Trotter	4,494	44.2	+5.2
Labor hold		Swing	−5.2	

=== Mackay ===
1938 Queensland state election: Mackay
Party	Candidate	Votes	%	±%
Labor	William Forgan Smith	7,153	80.6	+9.0
Social Credit	John Neville	1,717	19.4	+12.2
Total formal votes		8,870	97.3	−1.4
Informal votes		242	2.7	+1.4
Turnout		9,112	89.7	0.0
Labor hold		Swing	N/A	

=== Maranoa ===
1938 Queensland state election: Maranoa
Party	Candidate	Votes	%	±%
Labor	Charles Conroy	4,476	60.0	−10.5
Country	Royland Hembrow	2,986	40.0	+40.0
Total formal votes		7,462	95.9	−1.4
Informal votes		321	4.1	+1.4
Turnout		7,783	88.4	+2.1
Labor hold		Swing	N/A	

=== Maree ===
1938 Queensland state election: Maree
Party	Candidate	Votes	%	±%
Labor	William King	5,201	53.3	−16.6
United Australia	William Carter	3,830	39.2	+9.1
Social Credit	Charles Martin	727	7.5	+7.5
Total formal votes		9,758	98.7	+1.4
Informal votes		128	1.3	−1.4
Turnout		9,886	94.4	+0.6
Labor hold		Swing	N/A	

- Preferences were not distributed.

=== Maryborough ===
1938 Queensland state election: Maryborough
Party	Candidate	Votes	%	±%
Labor	David Farrell	5,645	61.2	−29.2
United Australia	Harold Reed	2,751	29.8	+29.8
Social Credit	Noel Bromiley	834	9.0	+9.0
Total formal votes		9,230	99.5	+2.0
Informal votes		50	0.5	−2.0
Turnout		9,280	94.7	−0.6
Labor hold		Swing	N/A	

- Preferences were not distributed.

=== Merthyr ===
1938 Queensland state election: Merthyr
Party	Candidate	Votes	%	±%
Labor	James Keogh	4,801	49.3	−17.2
United Australia	Edmund Cuppaidge	2,903	29.8	−3.7
Protestant Labour	Frederick Brown	2,042	20.9	+20.9
Total formal votes		9,746	99.0	+0.7
Informal votes		97	1.0	−0.7
Turnout		9,843	90.9	−0.6
Two-party-preferred result
Labor	James Keogh	4,982	53.8	−12.7
United Australia	Edmund Cuppaidge	4,272	46.2	+12.7
Labor hold		Swing	−12.7	

==== By-election ====
- This by-election was caused by the death of James Keogh. It was held on 9 November 1940.

1940 Merthyr state by-election
Party	Candidate	Votes	%	±%
Labor	Bill Moore	4,839	57.5	+8.2
United Australia	Patrick Kerwin	3,574	42.5	+12.7
Total formal votes		8,413		
Informal votes				
Turnout				
Labor hold		Swing	+3.7	

=== Mirani ===
1938 Queensland state election: Mirani
Party	Candidate	Votes	%	±%
Labor	Ted Walsh	4,337	48.8	−0.1
Country	James Wilkie	3,601	40.5	−6.0
Social Credit	Edwin Hill	952	10.7	+6.1
Total formal votes		8,890	99.0	−0.1
Informal votes		89	1.0	+0.1
Turnout		8,979	91.9	−1.0
Two-party-preferred result
Labor	Ted Walsh	4,507	54.8	+3.4
Country	James Wilkie	3,723	45.2	−3.4
Labor hold		Swing	+3.4	

=== Mundingburra ===
1938 Queensland state election: Mundingburra
Party	Candidate	Votes	%	±%
Labor	John Dash	4,773	50.3	−17.1
Country	Francis Hughes	2,128	22.4	−2.2
Protestant Labour	Lionel Parsons	1,733	18.3	+18.3
Communist	Doug Olive	856	9.0	+9.0
Total formal votes		9,490	98.6	+0.2
Informal votes		130	1.4	−0.2
Turnout		9,620	93.0	−1.8
Labor hold		Swing	N/A	

- Preferences were not distributed.

=== Murrumba ===
1938 Queensland state election: Murrumba
Party	Candidate	Votes	%	±%
Country	Frank Nicklin	4,930	52.9	−10.9
Social Credit	Geoffrey Nichols	2,733	29.4	+29.4
Labor	George Watson	1,648	17.7	+17.7
Total formal votes		9,311	98.7	+1.5
Informal votes		118	1.3	−1.5
Turnout		9,429	95.1	+0.4
Country hold		Swing	N/A	

- Preferences were not distributed.

=== Nanango ===
1938 Queensland state election: Nanango
Party	Candidate	Votes	%	±%
Country	Jim Edwards	3,719	42.6	−21.1
Ind. Social Credit	Henry Madden	2,524	29.0	+29.0
Labor	Horace Davies	2,476	28.4	+28.4
Total formal votes		8,719	99.3	+1.4
Informal votes		63	0.7	−1.4
Turnout		8,782	94.6	+2.5
Two-candidate-preferred result
Country	Jim Edwards	4,079	57.9	−5.8
Ind. Social Credit	Henry Madden	2,963	42.1	+42.1
Country hold		Swing	N/A	

=== Normanby ===
1938 Queensland state election: Normanby
Party	Candidate	Votes	%	±%
Labor	Tom Foley	4,052	53.8	−14.2
Country	Harry Brake	2,781	36.9	+36.9
Social Credit	Albert Webb	693	9.2	−22.8
Total formal votes		7,526	98.8	+2.3
Informal votes		94	1.2	−2.3
Turnout		7,620	88.5	−1.3
Labor hold		Swing	N/A	

- Preferences were not distributed.

=== Nundah ===
1938 Queensland state election: Nundah
Party	Candidate	Votes	%	±%
Labor	John Hayes	5,014	48.4	−18.1
Protestant Labour	Thomas Denovan	2,707	26.1	+26.1
United Australia	William Kelso	2,644	25.5	−8.0
Total formal votes		10,365	99.0	+0.1
Informal votes		101	1.0	−0.1
Turnout		10,466	95.9	+2.1
Two-candidate-preferred result
Labor	John Hayes	5,167	53.2	−13.3
Protestant Labour	Thomas Denovan	4,544	46.8	+46.8
Labor hold		Swing	N/A	

=== Oxley ===
1938 Queensland state election: Oxley
Party	Candidate	Votes	%	±%
United Australia	Thomas Nimmo	6,316	60.3	+6.9
Labor	Wilhelm Thieme	4,153	39.7	−6.9
Total formal votes		10,469	98.5	+1.1
Informal votes		155	1.5	−1.1
Turnout		10,624	94.0	+0.1
United Australia hold		Swing	+6.9	

=== Port Curtis ===
1938 Queensland state election: Port Curtis
Party	Candidate	Votes	%	±%
Labor	Tommy Williams	5,452	57.1	+2.1
Country	James Heading	4,102	42.9	+11.3
Total formal votes		9,554	98.9	+1.9
Informal votes		108	1.1	−1.9
Turnout		9,662	93.2	−2.7
Labor hold		Swing	N/A	

=== Rockhampton ===
1938 Queensland state election: Rockhampton
Party	Candidate	Votes	%	±%
Labor	James Larcombe	5,939	60.9	−11.5
Country	Thomas Parris	2,732	28.0	+28.0
Social Credit	Vivian Pugh	1,086	11.1	−16.5
Total formal votes		9,757	99.2	+1.0
Informal votes		80	0.8	−1.0
Turnout		9,837	91.8	−0.3
Labor hold		Swing	N/A	

- Preferences were not distributed.

=== Sandgate ===
1938 Queensland state election: Sandgate
Party	Candidate	Votes	%	±%
Labor	Roland Hislop	4,515	45.4	−9.6
United Australia	James Fry	3,849	38.7	−6.3
Protestant Labour	Richard Vane-Millbank	1,237	12.5	+12.5
Social Credit	Leonard Jones	336	3.4	+3.4
Total formal votes		9,937	98.8	+0.3
Informal votes		116	1.2	−0.3
Turnout		10,053	95.5	+0.6
Two-party-preferred result
Labor	Roland Hislop	4,801	52.3	−2.7
United Australia	James Fry	4,386	47.7	+2.7
Labor hold		Swing	−2.7	

=== South Brisbane ===
1938 Queensland state election: South Brisbane
Party	Candidate	Votes	%	±%
Labor	Vince Gair	5,105	49.8	−17.8
United Australia	William Kingwell	3,135	30.6	−1.8
Protestant Labour	James McCann	2,016	19.7	+19.7
Total formal votes		10,256	99.1	+2.0
Informal votes		97	0.9	−2.0
Turnout		10,353	93.1	+0.3
Two-party-preferred result
Labor	Vince Gair	5,295	55.4	−12.2
United Australia	William Kingwell	4,260	44.6	+12.2
Labor hold		Swing	−12.2	

=== Stanley ===
1938 Queensland state election: Stanley
Party	Candidate	Votes	%	±%
Country	Duncan MacDonald	5,344	62.2	−1.8
Labor	Frank Gillies	3,251	37.8	+1.8
Total formal votes		8,595	99.0	−0.1
Informal votes		88	1.0	+0.1
Turnout		8,683	95.4	−0.2
Country hold		Swing	−1.8	

=== The Tableland ===
1938 Queensland state election: The Tableland
Party	Candidate	Votes	%	±%
Labor	Harry Bruce	5,110	57.8	−8.6
Country	Henry Bonar	2,709	30.6	+4.3
Communist	Les Sullivan	1,025	11.6	+4.3
Total formal votes		8,844	98.2	−0.6
Informal votes		166	1.8	+0.6
Turnout		9,010	89.4	+1.1
Labor hold		Swing	N/A	

- Preferences were not distributed.

=== Toowong ===
1938 Queensland state election: Toowong
Party	Candidate	Votes	%	±%
Ind. United Australia	Harry Massey	3,137	31.9	+31.9
Labor	John O'Shea	2,561	26.0	−13.1
United Australia	Nicholas Lockyer	2,499	25.4	−27.1
Protestant Labour	Joseph West	1,639	16.7	+16.7
Total formal votes		9,836	98.7	+0.1
Informal votes		125	1.3	−0.1
Turnout		9,961	94.9	0.0
Two-candidate-preferred result
Ind. United Australia	Harry Massey	5,264	66.2	
Labor	John O'Shea	2,690	33.8	
Ind. United Australia gain from United Australia		Swing	N/A	

=== Toowoomba ===
1938 Queensland state election: Toowoomba
Party	Candidate	Votes	%	±%
Labor	Jack Duggan	5,189	52.5	−6.3
Country	Leslie Boyce	3,373	34.1	+2.1
Protestant Labour	James Neil	1,331	13.4	+13.4
Total formal votes		9,893	98.4	−0.6
Informal votes		164	1.6	+0.6
Turnout		10,057	91.7	+1.1
Labor hold		Swing	N/A	

- Preferences were not distributed.

=== Townsville ===
1938 Queensland state election: Townsville
Party	Candidate	Votes	%	±%
Labor	Maurice Hynes	4,379	50.0	−27.0
Protestant Labour	Alfred Loveridge	2,378	27.2	+27.2
Country	Spenser Hopkins	1,445	16.5	−6.5
Communist	Albert Robinson	548	6.3	+6.3
Total formal votes		8,750	99.2	+0.9
Informal votes		66	0.8	−0.9
Turnout		8,816	89.5	+1.5
Labor hold		Swing	N/A	

- Preferences were not distributed.

==== By-election ====
- This by-election was caused by the death of Maurice Hynes. It was held on 27 May 1939.

1939 Townsville state by-election
Party	Candidate	Votes	%	±%
Labor	George Keyatta	4,033	45.4	−4.6
Protestant Labour	George Webb	2,047	23.0	−4.2
Communist	Fred Paterson	1,509	17.0	+10.7
Country	Russell Skerman	1,297	14.6	−1.9
Total formal votes		8,886		
Informal votes				
Turnout				
Two-party-preferred result
Labor	George Keyatta	4,747	65.5	
Protestant Labour	George Webb	2,501	34.5	
Labor hold		Swing	N/A	

=== Warrego ===
1938 Queensland state election: Warrego
Party	Candidate	Votes	%	±%
Labor	Randolph Bedford	4,670	69.7	−30.3
Country	Charles Russell	2,027	30.3	+30.3
Total formal votes		6,697	99.2	
Informal votes		51	0.8	
Turnout		6,748	80.2	
Labor hold		Swing	N/A	

=== Warwick ===
1938 Queensland state election: Warwick
Party	Candidate	Votes	%	±%
Labor	John Healy	4,693	52.8	+7.0
Country	Edward Costello	4,196	47.2	+5.5
Total formal votes		8,889	99.2	−0.2
Informal votes		68	0.8	+0.2
Turnout		8,957	93.0	−1.3
Labor hold		Swing	+2.6	

=== West Moreton ===
1938 Queensland state election: West Moreton
Party	Candidate	Votes	%	±%
Country	Ted Maher	5,623	67.9	−0.2
Social Credit	James Kidman	2,296	27.7	+27.7
Communist	Jim Slater	359	4.3	+4.3
Total formal votes		8,278	98.8	−0.2
Informal votes		101	1.2	+0.2
Turnout		8,379	96.6	+0.4
Country hold		Swing	N/A	

- Preferences were not distributed.

=== Wide Bay ===
1938 Queensland state election: Wide Bay
Party	Candidate	Votes	%	±%
Country	Harry Clayton	4,173	49.3	−6.3
Social Credit	John Rex	2,597	30.7	−13.7
Labor	Benjamin Telfer	1,699	20.1	+20.1
Total formal votes		8,469	98.6	−0.2
Informal votes		116	1.4	+0.2
Turnout		8,585	96.2	+2.5
Two-candidate-preferred result
Country	Harry Clayton	4,297	59.9	+4.3
Social Credit	John Rex	2,871	40.1	−4.3
Country hold		Swing	+4.3	

=== Windsor ===
1938 Queensland state election: Windsor
Party	Candidate	Votes	%	±%
Labor	Herbert Williams	4,592	46.2	−11.3
United Australia	Edward Simpson	3,521	35.3	−7.2
Protestant Labour	Cecil Maxwell	1,291	13.0	+13.0
Independent Labor	Henry Bond	546	5.5	+5.5
Total formal votes		9,950	98.8	+0.3
Informal votes		124	1.2	−0.3
Turnout		10,074	94.6	+0.2
Two-party-preferred result
Labor	Herbert Williams	4,880	54.7	−2.8
United Australia	Edward Simpson	4,042	45.3	+2.8
Labor hold		Swing	−2.8	

=== Wynnum ===
1938 Queensland state election: Wynnum
Party	Candidate	Votes	%	±%
Labor	John Donnelly	4,041	36.5	−14.0
United Australia	Bill Dart	3,687	33.3	−1.4
Protestant Labour	Samuel Greene	2,290	20.7	+20.7
Social Credit	Thomas Ebbage	1,050	9.5	−5.3
Total formal votes		11,068	98.6	0.0
Informal votes		154	1.4	0.0
Turnout		11,222	94.0	−0.8
Two-party-preferred result
United Australia	Bill Dart	4,671	52.1	
Labor	John Donnelly	4,298	47.9	
United Australia gain from Labor		Swing	N/A	

== See also ==
- 1938 Queensland state election
- Candidates of the Queensland state election, 1938
- Members of the Queensland Legislative Assembly, 1938-1941
