= Results of the 1941 Queensland state election =

Queensland state election, 29 March 1941 Legislative Assembly << 1938–1944 >>
Enrolled voters	586,147^{[1]}				
Votes cast	529,247		Turnout	90.29	–2.22
Informal votes	9,520		Informal	1.80	+0.49
Summary of votes by party
Party	Primary votes	%	Swing	Seats	Change
Labor	267,206	51.41	+4.24	41	– 3
Country	108,604	20.90	–1.75	14	+ 1
United Australia	81,109	15.61	+1.64	4	± 0
Independent Socialist	10,561	1.97	+1.97	0	± 0
Independent Democrat	10,406	2.00	+2.00	2	+ 2
Protestant Labour	9,038	1.74	–7.01	0	– 1
Andrew Fisher Labor	5,476	1.02	+1.02	1	+ 1
Communist	5,383	1.00	-0.60	0	± 0
Independent	21,844	4.20	+3.56	0	± 0
Total	519,727			62	

This is a list of electoral district results for the 1941 Queensland state election.

At the time, the voting system in Queensland was based on contingency voting, which was similar to the modern optional preferential voting system. In electorates with 3 or more candidates, preferences were not distributed if a candidate received more than 50% of the primary vote.

If none received more than 50%, all except the top two candidates were eliminated from the count and their preferences distributed between the two leaders, with the one receiving the most votes declared the winner.

== Results by electoral district ==
=== Albert ===
1941 Queensland state election: Albert
Party	Candidate	Votes	%	±%
Country	Tom Plunkett	5,617	62.4	+21.9
Labor	John Bray	3,386	37.6	+9.0
Total formal votes		9,003	98.3	−0.7
Informal votes		156	1.7	+0.7
Turnout		9,159	87.3	−5.1
Country hold		Swing	+7.5	

=== Aubigny ===
1941 Queensland state election: Aubigny
Party	Candidate	Votes	%	±%
Country	Jim Sparkes	5,451	63.3	−2.4
Labor	Adolphus Baker	3,163	36.7	+12.7
Total formal votes		8,614	99.4	+0.5
Informal votes		50	0.6	−0.5
Turnout		8,664	93.0	+0.4
Country hold		Swing	−9.9	

=== Barcoo ===
1941 Queensland state election: Barcoo
Party	Candidate	Votes	%	±%
Labor	Frank Bulcock	4,809	79.6	−20.4
Country	Robert McGeoch	1,229	20.4	+20.4
Total formal votes		6,038	97.1	
Informal votes		181	2.9	
Turnout		6,219	80.2	
Labor hold		Swing	N/A	

==== By-election ====
- This by-election was caused by the resignation of Frank Bulcock. It was held on 1 May 1943.

1943 Barcoo state by-election
Party	Candidate	Votes	%	±%
Labor	Ned Davis	3,686	67.6	−12.0
Free Labor	J. Howe	1,062	19.5	+19.5
Independent	O.P.J. O'Beirne	704	12.9	+12.9
Total formal votes		5,452	98.7	+1.6
Informal votes		70	1.3	−1.6
Turnout		5,522		
Labor hold		Swing	N/A	

=== Baroona ===
1941 Queensland state election: Baroona
Party	Candidate	Votes	%	±%
Labor	Bill Power	5,317	59.9	+10.3
United Australia	Cecil Noble	3,564	40.1	+17.3
Total formal votes		8,881	97.6	−1.1
Informal votes		219	2.4	+1.1
Turnout		9,100	89.6	−2.8
Labor hold		Swing	N/A	

=== Bowen ===
1941 Queensland state election: Bowen
Party	Candidate	Votes	%	±%
Labor	Ernest Riordan	4,152	52.7	+13.5
Communist	Fred Paterson	3,733	47.3	+18.0
Total formal votes		7,885	96.6	−2.6
Informal votes		275	3.4	+2.6
Turnout		8,160	91.0	−3.6
Labor hold		Swing	−4.5	

=== Bremer ===
1941 Queensland state election: Bremer
Party	Candidate	Votes	%	±%
Labor	Frank Cooper	7,141	83.5	+0.1
Independent Socialist	Geordie Burns	1,411	16.5	−0.1
Total formal votes		8,552	97.2	+0.3
Informal votes		249	2.8	−0.3
Turnout		8,801	94.0	−1.0
Labor hold		Swing	+0.1	

=== Brisbane ===
1941 Queensland state election: Brisbane
Party	Candidate	Votes	%	±%
Labor	Johnno Mann	4,749	57.4	−8.6
United Australia	Neville Fogerty	2,856	34.5	+0.5
Communist	Claude Jones	670	8.1	+8.1
Total formal votes		8,275	97.6	−0.7
Informal votes		199	2.4	+0.7
Turnout		8,474	86.8	−1.4
Labor hold		Swing	−3.6	

- Preferences were not distributed.

=== Bulimba ===
1941 Queensland state election: Bulimba
Party	Candidate	Votes	%	±%
Labor	George Marriott	7,181	70.1	+10.3
United Australia	Daniel Miller	3,067	29.9	+8.1
Total formal votes		10,248	97.4	−0.2
Informal votes		275	2.6	+0.2
Turnout		10,523	93.7	−1.7
Labor hold		Swing	−3.2	

=== Bundaberg ===
1941 Queensland state election: Bundaberg
Party	Candidate	Votes	%	±%
Andrew Fisher Labor	Frank Barnes	5,476	51.1	+51.1
Labor	Bernard McLean	4,356	48.9	+4.8
Total formal votes		10,715	97.8	−1.4
Informal votes		246	2.2	+1.4
Turnout		10,961	93.4	−2.1
Andrew Fisher Labor gain from Labor		Swing	N/A	

=== Buranda ===
1941 Queensland state election: Buranda
Party	Candidate	Votes	%	±%
Labor	Ted Hanson	5,745	56.9	+6.0
United Australia	Hector Annat	4,345	43.1	+19.2
Total formal votes		10,090	97.9	−0.6
Informal votes		216	2.1	+0.6
Turnout		10,306	91.5	−2.6
Labor hold		Swing	−11.1	

=== Cairns ===
1941 Queensland state election: Cairns
Party	Candidate	Votes	%	±%
Labor	John O'Keefe	5,003	55.4	−0.9
Country	William Griffen	3,193	35.3	+12.9
Independent	Alan Tucker	835	9.3	+9.3
Total formal votes		9,031	98.5	−0.3
Informal votes		135	1.5	+0.3
Turnout		9,166	87.0	−3.6
Labor hold		Swing	−10.5	

- Preferences were not distributed.

=== Carnarvon ===
1941 Queensland state election: Carnarvon
Party	Candidate	Votes	%	±%
Labor	Paul Hilton	unopposed		
Labor hold		Swing		

=== Carpentaria ===
1941 Queensland state election: Carpentaria
Party	Candidate	Votes	%	±%
Labor	Norm Smith	3,054	51.8	−4.0
Independent	James Boyd	2,838	48.2	+48.2
Total formal votes		5,892	98.6	−0.2
Informal votes		83	1.4	+0.2
Turnout		5,975	72.7	−7.1
Labor hold		Swing	N/A	

=== Charters Towers ===
1941 Queensland state election: Charters Towers
Party	Candidate	Votes	%	±%
Labor	Arthur Jones	4,023	63.2	−36.8
Protestant Labour	Syd Williams	2,344	36.8	+36.8
Total formal votes		6,367	98.6	
Informal votes		89	1.4	
Turnout		6,456	82.9	
Labor hold		Swing	N/A	

=== Cook ===
1941 Queensland state election: Cook
Party	Candidate	Votes	%	±%
Labor	Harold Collins	4,388	57.0	−2.0
Country	James McDonald	3,315	43.0	+9.2
Total formal votes		7,703	95.4	−2.6
Informal votes		368	4.6	+2.6
Turnout		8,071	89.0	−1.4
Labor hold		Swing	−6.5	

=== Cooroora ===
1941 Queensland state election: Cooroora
Party	Candidate	Votes	%	±%
Country	Harry Walker	unopposed		
Country hold		Swing		

=== Cunningham ===
1941 Queensland state election: Cunningham
Party	Candidate	Votes	%	±%
Independent Country	William Deacon	4,062	47.4	+47.4
Labor	John Hilton	2,806	32.7	+32.7
Country	Herbert Castles	1,704	19.9	−80.1
Total formal votes		8,572	99.2	
Informal votes		66	0.8	
Turnout		8,638	92.1	
Two-candidate-preferred result
Independent Country	William Deacon	5,492	65.8	−34.2
Labor	John Hilton	2,860	34.2	+34.2
Independent Country gain from Country		Swing	N/A	

=== Dalby ===
1941 Queensland state election: Dalby
Party	Candidate	Votes	%	±%
Labor	Aubrey Slessar	5,434	56.0	+5.7
Country	Godfrey Morgan Jnr	4,262	44.0	−5.7
Total formal votes		9,696	99.2	+0.3
Informal votes		74	0.8	−0.3
Turnout		9,770	87.1	−4.6
Labor hold		Swing	+5.7	

=== East Toowoomba ===
1941 Queensland state election: East Toowoomba
Party	Candidate	Votes	%	±%
Country	Herbert Yeates	4,623	54.2	+23.1
Labor	James Kane	3,906	45.8	+0.4
Total formal votes		8,529	98.1	−0.5
Informal votes		167	1.9	+0.5
Turnout		8,696	93.5	+3.4
Country hold		Swing	+2.8	

=== Enoggera ===
1941 Queensland state election: Enoggera
Party	Candidate	Votes	%	±%
Labor	George Taylor	5,597	50.5	−4.2
United Australia	Ernest Lanham	4,786	43.1	+20.8
Independent	Mabel Matyer	708	6.4	+6.4
Total formal votes		11,091	98.3	−0.9
Informal votes		193	1.7	+0.9
Turnout		11,284	93.4	−1.5
Labor hold		Swing	−16.5	

- Preferences were not distributed.

=== Fassifern ===
1941 Queensland state election: Fassifern
Party	Candidate	Votes	%	±%
Country	Alf Muller	5,981	64.7	−2.6
Labor	Peter Nelson	3,265	35.3	+2.6
Total formal votes		9,246	97.8	−0.8
Informal votes		212	2.2	+0.8
Turnout		9,458	93.0	−1.7
Country hold		Swing	−2.6	

=== Fitzroy ===
1941 Queensland state election: Fitzroy
Party	Candidate	Votes	%	±%
Labor	Jim Clark	unopposed		
Labor hold		Swing		

=== Fortitude Valley ===
1941 Queensland state election: Fortitude Valley
Party	Candidate	Votes	%	±%
Labor	Samuel Brassington	5,005	56.5	+0.1
United Australia	Ernest Downey	3,851	43.5	+16.1
Total formal votes		8,856	98.0	−0.7
Informal votes		180	2.0	+0.7
Turnout		9,036	90.4	−2.9
Labor hold		Swing	−10.5	

=== Gregory ===
1941 Queensland state election: Gregory
Party	Candidate	Votes	%	±%
Labor	George Devries	2,709	54.2	−10.7
Independent	Charles Brown	2,291	45.8	+45.8
Total formal votes		5,000	97.3	−0.6
Informal votes		136	2.7	+0.6
Turnout		5,136	72.6	−8.8
Labor gain from Independent		Swing	N/A	

- While Labor had won this seat in the previous election, the Independent had won it in a by-election.

=== Gympie ===
1941 Queensland state election: Gympie
Party	Candidate	Votes	%	±%
Labor	Thomas Dunstan	3,738	52.4	+9.4
United Australia	Ronald Witham	2,142	30.0	+30.0
Country	William Kidd	1,251	17.5	−4.1
Total formal votes		7,131	99.5	+0.2
Informal votes		39	0.5	−0.2
Turnout		7,170	93.3	−0.4
Labor hold		Swing	N/A	

- Preferences were not distributed.

=== Hamilton ===
1941 Queensland state election: Hamilton
Party	Candidate	Votes	%	±%
Independent Democrat	Bruce Pie	6,221	63.8	+63.8
United Australia	Hugh Russell	3,538	36.2	−32.5
Total formal votes		9,759	98.0	−0.7
Informal votes		194	2.0	+0.7
Turnout		9,953	91.5	−2.8
Independent Democrat gain from United Australia		Swing	N/A	

==== By-election ====
- This by-election was caused by the resignation of Bruce Pie. It was held on 9 October 1943.

1943 Hamilton state by-election
Party	Candidate	Votes	%	±%
People's Party	John Chandler	5,069	54.7	+18.5
Country	Graham Hart	2,231	24.1	+24.1
Labor	Frank Roberts	1,967	21.2	+21.2
Total formal votes		9,267	99.3	+1.3
Informal votes		62	0.7	−1.3
Turnout		9,329		
People's Party gain from Independent Democrat		Swing	N/A	

=== Herbert ===
1941 Queensland state election: Herbert
Party	Candidate	Votes	%	±%
Labor	Stephen Theodore	5,182	56.2	+3.3
Country	Alfred Moule	2,417	26.2	+8.3
Independent Socialist	Jack Wells	1,617	17.5	+0.5
Total formal votes		9,216	98.2	−0.2
Informal votes		166	1.8	+0.2
Turnout		9,382	91.7	+4.5
Labor hold		Swing	−6.5	

- Preferences were not distributed.

=== Ipswich ===
1941 Queensland state election: Ipswich
Party	Candidate	Votes	%	±%
Labor	David Gledson	6,630	66.8	+0.8
Country	John Cantwell	2,534	25.5	+25.5
Independent Socialist	Merv Welsby	756	7.6	+7.6
Total formal votes		9,920	98.3	−0.1
Informal votes		171	1.7	+0.1
Turnout		10,091	95.1	−0.8
Labor hold		Swing	+6.3	

- Preferences were not distributed.

=== Isis ===
1941 Queensland state election: Isis
Party	Candidate	Votes	%	±%
Country	William Brand	4,979	59.1	−5.6
Labor	William Ivey	3,439	40.9	+5.6
Total formal votes		8,418	97.8	−0.8
Informal votes		190	2.2	+0.8
Turnout		8,608	95.5	+0.8
Country hold		Swing	−5.6	

=== Ithaca ===
1941 Queensland state election: Ithaca
Party	Candidate	Votes	%	±%
Labor	Ned Hanlon	6,155	56.9	+7.0
Independent	Alexander Jolly	4,174	38.6	+38.6
Independent Socialist	Ted Bacon	495	4.6	+4.6
Total formal votes		10,824	98.6	−0.5
Informal votes		158	1.4	+0.5
Turnout		10,982	93.2	−1.6
Labor hold		Swing	N/A	

- Preferences were not distributed.

=== Kelvin Grove ===
1941 Queensland state election: Kelvin Grove
Party	Candidate	Votes	%	±%
Labor	Bert Turner	5,449	50.7	+8.2
Ind. United Australia	Richard Hill	2,654	24.7	+24.7
Independent	George Morris	2,646	24.6	+24.6
Total formal votes		10,749	98.7	−0.8
Informal votes		142	1.3	+0.8
Turnout		10,891	92.3	−3.0
Labor gain from Independent		Swing	N/A	

- Preferences were not distributed.

=== Kennedy ===
1941 Queensland state election: Kennedy
Party	Candidate	Votes	%	±%
Labor	Cecil Jesson	5,210	57.7	−6.1
Country	Aubrey Jurd	2,833	31.4	−4.8
Communist	Florence Milburn	980	10.9	+10.9
Total formal votes		9,023	98.2	+0.3
Informal votes		161	1.8	−0.3
Turnout		9,184	88.4	−1.7
Labor hold		Swing	+1.0	

- Preferences were not distributed.

=== Keppel ===
1941 Queensland state election: Keppel
Party	Candidate	Votes	%	±%
Country	David Daniel	4,417	53.0	−1.2
Labor	Walter Ingram	3,206	38.5	+38.5
Independent	Ezra Shorley	714	8.6	+8.6
Total formal votes		8,337	98.9	+0.2
Informal votes		90	1.1	−0.2
Turnout		8,427	90.0	−2.3
Country hold		Swing	N/A	

- Preferences were not distributed.

=== Kurilpa ===
1941 Queensland state election: Kurilpa
Party	Candidate	Votes	%	±%
Labor	Kerry Copley	4,556	48.4	+1.6
United Australia	Norman Brandon	4,374	46.5	+21.0
Independent Socialist	Ruby McGrorty	477	5.1	+0.7
Total formal votes		9,407	98.4	−0.2
Informal votes		153	1.6	+0.2
Turnout		9,560	85.5	−5.8
Two-party-preferred result
Labor	Kerry Copley	4,629	50.9	−5.2
United Australia	Norman Brandon	4,469	49.1	+5.2
Labor hold		Swing	−5.2	

=== Logan ===
1941 Queensland state election: Logan
Party	Candidate	Votes	%	±%
Labor	John Brown	6,848	55.0	+5.4
United Australia	Albert Pro-Copis	5,602	45.0	+12.8
Total formal votes		12,450	98.1	−0.2
Informal votes		240	1.9	+0.2
Turnout		12,690	91.8	−2.4
Labor hold		Swing	−0.8	

=== Mackay ===
1941 Queensland state election: Mackay
Party	Candidate	Votes	%	±%
Labor	William Forgan Smith	6,436	67.5	−13.1
Independent	John Mulherin	3,103	32.5	+32.5
Total formal votes		9,539	98.2	+0.9
Informal votes		170	1.8	−0.9
Turnout		9,709	88.7	−1.0
Labor hold		Swing	N/A	

==== By-election ====
- This by-election was caused by the resignation of William Forgan Smith. It was held on 20 March 1943.

1943 Mackay state by-election
Party	Candidate	Votes	%	±%
Labor	Fred Graham	3,091	38.8	−28.7
Country	Ian Wood	2,464	30.9	+30.9
Independent	John Mulherin	2,085	26.2	−6.3
Independent	Peter Punzell	322	4.0	+4.0
Total formal votes		7,962	99.4	+1.2
Informal votes		44	0.6	−1.2
Turnout		8,006		
Labor hold		Swing	N/A	

=== Maranoa ===
1941 Queensland state election: Maranoa
Party	Candidate	Votes	%	±%
Labor	Charles Conroy	4,301	59.2	−0.8
Country	Leslie Brown	2,961	40.8	+0.8
Total formal votes		7,262	98.2	+2.3
Informal votes		136	1.8	−2.3
Turnout		7,398	81.7	−6.7
Labor hold		Swing	−0.8	

=== Maree ===
1941 Queensland state election: Maree
Party	Candidate	Votes	%	±%
United Australia	Louis Luckins	4,702	50.2	+11.0
Labor	William King	4,662	49.8	−3.5
Total formal votes		9,364	96.5	−2.2
Informal votes		338	3.5	+2.2
Turnout		9,702	91.8	−2.6
United Australia gain from Labor		Swing	+7.8	

=== Maryborough ===
1941 Queensland state election: Maryborough
Party	Candidate	Votes	%	±%
Labor	David Farrell	5,717	59.1	−2.1
Protestant Labour	Robert McDowell	3,959	40.9	+40.9
Total formal votes		9,676	99.1	−0.4
Informal votes		91	0.9	+0.4
Turnout		9,767	92.9	−1.8
Labor hold		Swing	N/A	

=== Merthyr ===
1941 Queensland state election: Merthyr
Party	Candidate	Votes	%	±%
Labor	Bill Moore	5,302	58.4	+9.1
United Australia	Samuel Glassey	3,780	41.6	+11.8
Total formal votes		9,082	98.3	−0.7
Informal votes		158	1.7	+0.7
Turnout		9,240	93.7	+2.8
Labor hold		Swing	+4.6	

=== Mirani ===
1941 Queensland state election: Mirani
Party	Candidate	Votes	%	±%
Labor	Ted Walsh	5,254	58.9	+10.1
Country	Alexander Kippen	3,665	41.1	+0.6
Total formal votes		8,919	99.0	0.0
Informal votes		86	1.0	0.0
Turnout		9,005	88.0	−3.9
Labor hold		Swing	+4.1	

=== Mundingburra ===
1941 Queensland state election: Mundingburra
Party	Candidate	Votes	%	±%
Labor	John Dash	5,623	56.3	+6.0
Protestant Labour	Lionel Parsons	2,735	27.4	+9.1
Independent Socialist	Doug Olive	1,624	16.3	+7.3
Total formal votes		9,982	97.6	−1.0
Informal votes		243	2.4	+1.0
Turnout		10,225	90.9	−2.1
Labor hold		Swing	N/A	

- Preferences were not distributed.

=== Murrumba ===
1941 Queensland state election: Murrumba
Party	Candidate	Votes	%	±%
Country	Frank Nicklin	6,841	70.9	+18.0
Labor	George Watson	2,810	29.1	+11.4
Total formal votes		9,651	98.3	−0.4
Informal votes		169	1.7	+0.4
Turnout		9,820	90.3	−4.8
Country hold		Swing	N/A	

=== Nanango ===
1941 Queensland state election: Nanango
Party	Candidate	Votes	%	±%
Country	Jim Edwards	4,052	45.1	+2.5
Labor	Cecil Tracey	3,668	40.8	+12.4
Independent	George Anderson	1,271	14.1	+14.1
Total formal votes		8,991	99.4	+0.1
Informal votes		55	0.6	−0.1
Turnout		9,046	91.0	−3.6
Two-party-preferred result
Country	Jim Edwards	4,569	52.6	−5.3
Labor	Cecil Tracey	4,120	47.4	+47.4
Country hold		Swing	N/A	

=== Normanby ===
1941 Queensland state election: Normanby
Party	Candidate	Votes	%	±%
Labor	Tom Foley	4,544	58.2	+4.4
Independent	George Hamilton	3,264	41.8	+41.8
Total formal votes		7,808	99.1	+0.3
Informal votes		69	0.9	−0.3
Turnout		7,877	85.5	−3.0
Labor hold		Swing	N/A	

=== Nundah ===
1941 Queensland state election: Nundah
Party	Candidate	Votes	%	±%
Labor	John Hayes	5,672	53.3	+13.6
United Australia	William Cook	4,972	46.7	+21.2
Total formal votes		10,644	98.4	−0.6
Informal votes		175	1.6	+0.6
Turnout		10,819	93.5	−2.4
Labor hold		Swing	+0.1	

=== Oxley ===
1941 Queensland state election: Oxley
Party	Candidate	Votes	%	±%
United Australia	Thomas Nimmo	6,524	61.5	+1.2
Labor	Henry Herbert	4,079	38.5	−1.2
Total formal votes		10,603	98.1	−0.4
Informal votes		206	1.9	+0.4
Turnout		10,809	92.1	−1.4
United Australia hold		Swing	+1.2	

==== By-election ====
- This by-election was caused by the death of Thomas Nimmo. It was held on 17 April 1943.

1943 Oxley state by-election
Party	Candidate	Votes	%	±%
United Australia	Tom Kerr	4,988	50.6	−10.9
Labor	Felix Dittmer	3,975	40.4	+1.9
Independent	Nora Solly	889	9.0	+9.0
Total formal votes		9,852	98.9	+0.8
Informal votes		109	1.1	−0.8
Turnout		9,961	76.5	−15.6
United Australia hold		Swing	N/A	

=== Port Curtis ===
1941 Queensland state election: Port Curtis
Party	Candidate	Votes	%	±%
Labor	Tommy Williams	6,677	64.3	+7.1
Country	Geoffrey Nichols	3,709	35.7	−7.1
Total formal votes		10,386	98.9	0.0
Informal votes		114	1.1	0.0
Turnout		10,500	90.8	−2.4
Labor hold		Swing	+7.1	

=== Rockhampton ===
1941 Queensland state election: Rockhampton
Party	Candidate	Votes	%	±%
Labor	James Larcombe	6,920	72.9	+12.0
Independent Socialist	Robert Nicholls	2,575	27.1	+27.1
Total formal votes		9,495	95.9	−3.3
Informal votes		401	4.1	+3.3
Turnout		9,896	88.4	−3.4
Labor hold		Swing	N/A	

=== Sandgate ===
1941 Queensland state election: Sandgate
Party	Candidate	Votes	%	±%
Labor	Roland Hislop	3,969	38.7	−6.7
Country	Eric Decker	3,936	37.4	+37.4
United Australia	James Fry	2,457	23.9	−14.8
Total formal votes		10,292	97.8	−1.0
Informal votes		231	2.2	+1.0
Turnout		10,493	93.1	−2.4
Two-party-preferred result
Country	Eric Decker	4,915	54.5	+54.5
Labor	Roland Hislop	4,105	45.5	−6.8
Country gain from Labor		Swing	N/A	

=== South Brisbane ===
1941 Queensland state election: South Brisbane
Party	Candidate	Votes	%	±%
Labor	Vince Gair	5,740	56.7	+6.9
United Australia	Daniel Rowley	4,393	43.3	+12.7
Total formal votes		10,133	97.5	−1.6
Informal votes		256	2.5	+1.6
Turnout		10,389	88.2	−4.9
Labor hold		Swing	+1.3	

=== Stanley ===
1941 Queensland state election: Stanley
Party	Candidate	Votes	%	±%
Country	Duncan MacDonald	5,239	59.7	−2.5
Labor	Jim Hogan	3,539	40.3	+2.5
Total formal votes		8,778	99.1	+0.1
Informal votes		82	0.9	−0.1
Turnout		8,860	92.3	−3.1
Country hold		Swing	−2.5	

=== The Tableland ===
1941 Queensland state election: The Tableland
Party	Candidate	Votes	%	±%
Labor	Harry Bruce	5,042	58.5	+0.7
Country	Robert Griffiths	2,806	32.5	+1.9
Independent Socialist	Jim Slater	776	9.0	−2.6
Total formal votes		8,624	98.8	+0.6
Informal votes		105	1.2	−0.6
Turnout		8,729	87.3	−2.1
Labor hold		Swing	−1.2	

- Preferences were not distributed.

=== Toowong ===
1941 Queensland state election: Toowong
Party	Candidate	Votes	%	±%
United Australia	Harry Massey	6,403	63.8	+38.4
Labor	Tom Laws	3,632	36.2	+10.2
Total formal votes		10,037	98.4	−0.3
Informal votes		158	1.6	+0.3
Turnout		10,195	93.1	−1.8
United Australia gain from Ind. United Australia		Swing	N/A	

- Massey was elected as an independent at the previous election.

=== Toowoomba ===
1941 Queensland state election: Toowoomba
Party	Candidate	Votes	%	±%
Labor	Jack Duggan	6,604	67.7	+15.2
Country	John Leahy	3,146	32.3	−1.8
Total formal votes		9,750	98.2	−0.2
Informal votes		175	1.8	+0.2
Turnout		9,925	94.7	+3.0
Labor hold		Swing	+7.1	

=== Townsville ===
1941 Queensland state election: Townsville
Party	Candidate	Votes	%	±%
Labor	George Keyatta	unopposed		
Labor hold		Swing		

=== Warrego ===
1941 Queensland state election: Warrego
Party	Candidate	Votes	%	±%
Labor	Randolph Bedford	unopposed		
Labor hold		Swing		

==== By-election ====
- This by-election was caused by the death of Randolph Bedford. It was held on 30 August 1941.

1941 Warrego state by-election
Party	Candidate	Votes	%	±%
Labor	Harry O'Shea	3,426	55.6	−44.4
Independent	C.V.W. Watson	2,187	35.5	+35.5
Independent	Oswald Allen	547	8.9	+8.9
Total formal votes		6,160	99.1	
Informal votes		54	0.9	
Turnout		6,214	75.7	
Labor hold		Swing	N/A	

=== Warwick ===
1941 Queensland state election: Warwick
Party	Candidate	Votes	%	±%
Labor	John Healy	4,766	55.0	+2.2
Country	Richard Matthews	3,899	45.0	−2.2
Total formal votes		8,665	99.1	−0.1
Informal votes		81	0.9	+0.1
Turnout		8,746	91.3	−1.7
Labor hold		Swing	+2.2	

=== West Moreton ===
1941 Queensland state election: West Moreton
Party	Candidate	Votes	%	±%
Country	Ted Maher	5,525	65.4	−2.5
Labor	Fred Howman	2,923	34.6	+34.6
Total formal votes		8,448	99.3	+0.5
Informal votes		57	0.7	−0.5
Turnout		8,505	93.7	−2.9
Country hold		Swing	N/A	

=== Wide Bay ===
1941 Queensland state election: Wide Bay
Party	Candidate	Votes	%	±%
Country	Harry Clayton	5,057	56.8	+7.5
Labor	Thomas Thorpe	3,844	43.2	+23.1
Total formal votes		8,901	98.5	−0.1
Informal votes		131	1.5	+0.1
Turnout		9,032	92.4	−3.8
Country hold		Swing	N/A	

=== Windsor ===
1941 Queensland state election: Windsor
Party	Candidate	Votes	%	±%
Labor	Herbert Williams	4,491	44.6	−1.6
Independent Democrat	Harry Moorhouse	4,185	41.5	+41.5
United Australia	Neil O'Sullivan	1,401	13.9	−21.4
Total formal votes		10,077	98.6	−0.2
Informal votes		138	1.4	+0.2
Turnout		10,215	92.8	−1.8
Two-candidate-preferred result
Independent Democrat	Harry Moorhouse	4,647	50.3	+50.3
Labor	Herbert Williams	4,590	49.7	−5.0
Independent Democrat gain from Labor		Swing	N/A	

=== Wynnum ===
1941 Queensland state election: Wynnum
Party	Candidate	Votes	%	±%
United Australia	Bill Dart	5,698	51.2	+17.9
Labor	William Laracy	4,506	40.5	+4.0
Independent Socialist	Joseph Bailes	930	8.3	+8.3
Total formal votes		11,134	98.0	−0.6
Informal votes		222	2.0	+0.6
Turnout		11,356	91.5	−2.5
United Australia hold		Swing	+3.7	

- Preferences were not distributed.

== See also ==
- 1941 Queensland state election
- Candidates of the Queensland state election, 1941
- Members of the Queensland Legislative Assembly, 1941-1944
