= Candidates of the 1938 Queensland state election =

The 1938 state election in Queensland, Australia was held on 2 April 1938.

Since the previous election, the Country and Progressive National Party (CPNP) had split into the state branches of the United Australia Party and the Country Party. Seats won by the CPNP in 1935 are listed as held by whichever successor party the MP joined.

== By-elections ==
- On 14 December 1935, Jack Duggan (Labor) was elected to succeed Evan Llewelyn (Labor), who had resigned on 28 November, as the member for Toowoomba.
- On 4 April 1936, Johnno Mann (Labor) was elected to succeed Robert Funnell (Labor), who had died on 3 January, as the member for Brisbane.
- On 4 April 1936, David Daniel (Country) was elected to succeed Owen Daniel (Country), who had died on 5 January, as the member for Keppel.
- On 20 June 1936, Ernest Riordan (Labor) was elected to succeed Charles Collins (Labor), who had died on 28 March, as the member for Bowen.
- On 27 February 1937, William Demaine (Labor) was elected to succeed James Stopford (Labor), who had died on 30 November 1936, as the member for Maryborough.

== Retiring Members ==
=== Labor ===
- William Copley MLA (Bulimba)
- William Demaine MLA (Maryborough)

=== Country ===
- Roy Bell MLA (Stanley)

=== United Australia ===
- James Maxwell MLA (Toowong)

== Candidates ==
Sitting members at the time of the election are shown in bold text.

Electorate	Held by	Labor candidate	Coalition candidate	Protestant Labor candidate	Social Credit candidate	Other candidates
Albert	Country	John Bray	**Tom Plunkett** (CP)	Robert Elliott	George Gray	
Aubigny	Country	James Strofeld	**Arthur Moore** (CP)			Hermann Wrembeck (Ind)
Barcoo	Labor	**Frank Bulcock**				
Baroona	Labor	**Bill Power**	Edwyn Roper (UAP)	Ralph Powell		
Bowen	Labor	**Ernest Riordan**	Ernest Forde (CP)		Henry Beck	Fred Paterson (CPA)
Bremer	Labor	**Frank Cooper**				Geordie Burns (CPA)
Brisbane	Labor	**Johnno Mann**	Benjamin White (UAP)			
Bulimba	Labor	George Marriott	Robert Larmar (UAP)		Julius Streeter	Bernard Dent (Ind)
Bundaberg	Labor	**Bernard McLean**	Laurence Scotney (CP)	Ernest Miles	Henry Clegton	
Buranda	Labor	**Ted Hanson**	Hector Annat (UAP)	Joseph Webster	Harold Tapper	
Cairns	Labor	**John O'Keefe**	William Chapman (CP)	Robert Smith		
Carnarvon	Labor	**Paul Hilton**	John Leahy (CP)			
Carpentaria	Labor	**John Mullan**	James Boyd (CP)			
Charters Towers	Labor	**William Wellington**				
Cook	Labor	**Harold Collins**	George Weaver (CP)		Joseph Mears	
Cooroora	Country	Andrew Thompson	**Harry Walker** (CP)		Denis Hannay	
Cunningham	Country		**William Deacon** (CP)			
Dalby	Country	Aubrey Slessar	**Godfrey Morgan** (CP)			
East Toowoomba	Labor	**James Kane**	Herbert Yeates (CP)			James Annand (Ind UAP)
Enoggera	Labor	**George Taylor**	Robert Gardiner (UAP)	James Underhill		
Fassifern	Country	John Holman	**Alf Muller** (CP)			
Fitzroy	Labor	**Jim Clark**	Edwin Hiskens (CP)		Sidney Cooper	
Fortitude Valley	Labor	**Samuel Brassington**	William Boden (UAP)	Andrew Knox		
Gregory	Labor	**George Pollock**	Edward Phillott (CP)			
Gympie	Labor	**Thomas Dunstan**	Vivian Tozer (CP)	William Millett	Alfred Taylor	
Hamilton	United Australia	William Pinder	**Hugh Russell** (UAP)			
Herbert	Labor	**Percy Pease**	Clarence Page (CP)	Ernest Malin		Jack Henry (CPA)
Ipswich	Labor	**David Gledson**	Henry Beverley (UAP)			
Isis	Country	Ernest Widdup	**William Brand** (CP)			
Ithaca	Labor	**Ned Hanlon**	Kenneth Morris (UAP)	George Webb		
Kelvin Grove	Labor	**Frank Waters**	Edgar Ralph (UAP)	George Morris		
Kennedy	Labor	**Cecil Jesson**	James Kennedy (CP)			
Keppel	Country		**David Daniel** (CP)		John Harding	John Salmon (Ind)
Kurilpa	Labor	**Kerry Copley**	John Pringle (UAP)	Joseph Moore		Alec MacDonald (CPA)
Logan	Labor	**John Brown**	Allan Trotter (UAP)	John Becconsall		Mary DeMattos (Ind)
Mackay	Labor	**William Forgan Smith**			John Neville	
Maranoa	Labor	**Charles Conroy**	Royland Hembrow (CP)			
Maree	Labor	**William King**	William Carter (UAP)		Charles Martin	
Maryborough	Labor	David Farrell	Harold Reed (UAP)		Noel Bromiley	
Merthyr	Labor	**James Keogh**	Edmund Cuppaidge (UAP)	Frederick Brown		
Mirani	Labor	**Ted Walsh**	James Wilkie (CP)		Edwin Hill	
Mundingburra	Labor	**John Dash**	Francis Hughes (CP)	Lionel Parsons		Doug Olive (CPA)
Murrumba	Country	George Watson	**Frank Nicklin** (CP)		Geoffrey Nichols	
Nanango	Country	Horace Davies	**Jim Edwards** (CP)			Henry Madden (Ind SC)
Normanby	Labor	**Tom Foley**	Harry Brake (CP)		Albert Webb	
Nundah	Labor	**John Hayes**	William Kelso (UAP)	Thomas Denovan		
Oxley	United Australia	Wilhelm Thieme	**Thomas Nimmo** (UAP)			
Port Curtis	Labor	**Tommy Williams**	James Heading (CP)			
Rockhampton	Labor	**James Larcombe**	Thomas Parris (CP)		Vivian Pugh	
Sandgate	Labor	**Roland Hislop**	James Fry (UAP)	Richard Vane-Millbank	Leonard Jones	
South Brisbane	Labor	**Vince Gair**	William Kingwell (UAP)	James McCann		
Stanley	Country	Frank Gillies	Duncan MacDonald (CP)			
The Tableland	Labor	**Harry Bruce**	Henry Bonar (CP)			Les Sullivan (CPA)
Toowong	United Australia	John O'Shea	Nicholas Lockyer (UAP)	Joseph West		Harry Massey (Ind UAP)
Toowoomba	Labor	**Jack Duggan**	Leslie Boyce (CP)	James Neil		
Townsville	Labor	**Maurice Hynes**	Spenser Hopkins (CP)	Alfred Loveridge		Albert Robinson (CPA)
Warrego	Labor	**Randolph Bedford**	Charles Russell (CP)			
Warwick	Labor	**John Healy**	Edward Costello (CP)			
West Moreton	Country		**Ted Maher** (CP)		James Kidman	Jim Slater (CPA)
Wide Bay	Country	Benjamin Telfer	**Harry Clayton** (CP)		John Rex	
Windsor	Labor	**Herbert Williams**	Edward Simpson (UAP)	Cecil Maxwell		Henry Bond (Ind Lab)
Wynnum	Labor	**John Donnelly**	Bill Dart (UAP)	Samuel Greene	Thomas Ebbage	

== See also ==
- 1938 Queensland state election
- Members of the Queensland Legislative Assembly, 1935–1938
- Members of the Queensland Legislative Assembly, 1938–1941
- List of political parties in Australia
