= Candidates of the 1941 Queensland state election =

The 1941 Queensland state election was held on 29 March 1941.

== By-elections ==
- On 27 May 1939, Arthur Jones (Labor) was elected to succeed William Wellington (Labor), who had died on 2 March, as the member for Charters Towers.
- On 27 May 1939, Charles Brown (Independent) was elected to succeed George Pollock (Labor), who had died on 24 March, as the member for Gregory.
- On 27 May 1939, George Keyatta (Labor) was elected to succeed Maurice Hynes (Labor), who had died on 27 March, as the member for Townsville.
- On 9 November 1940, Bill Moore (Labor) was elected to succeed James Keogh (Labor), who had died on 31 August 1940, as the member for Merthyr.
- On 9 November 1940, Stephen Theodore (Labor) was elected to succeed Percy Pease (Labor), who had died on 17 September 1940, as the member for Herbert.

== Retiring Members ==
=== Labor ===
- John Mullan MLA (Carpentaria)

=== Country ===
- Arthur Moore MLA (Aubigny)

== Candidates ==
Sitting members at the time of the election are shown in bold text.

| Electorate | Held by | Labor candidate | Coalition candidate | Other candidates |
|---|---|---|---|---|
| Albert | Country | John Bray | **Tom Plunkett** (CP) | |
| Aubigny | Country | Adolphus Baker | Jim Sparkes (CP) | |
| Barcoo | Labor | **Frank Bulcock** | Robert McGeoch (CP) | |
| Baroona | Labor | **Bill Power** | Cecil Noble (UAP) | |
| Bowen | Labor | **Ernest Riordan** | | Fred Paterson (Ind Soc) |
| Bremer | Labor | **Frank Cooper** | | Geordie Burns (Ind Soc) |
| Brisbane | Labor | **Johnno Mann** | Neville Fogerty (UAP) | Claude Jones (Ind Soc) |
| Bulimba | Labor | **George Marriott** | Daniel Miller (UAP) | |
| Bundaberg | Labor | **Bernard McLean** | | Frank Barnes (Ind Lab) |
| Buranda | Labor | **Ted Hanson** | Hector Annat (UAP) | |
| Cairns | Labor | **John O'Keefe** | William Griffen (CP) | Alan Tucker (Ind) |
| Carnarvon | Labor | **Paul Hilton** | | |
| Carpentaria | Labor | Norm Smith | | James Boyd (Ind) |
| Charters Towers | Labor | **Arthur Jones** | | Syd Williams (PLP) |
| Cook | Labor | **Harold Collins** | James McDonald (CP) | |
| Cooroora | Country | | **Harry Walker** (CP) | |
| Cunningham | Country | John Hilton | Herbert Castles (CP) | **William Deacon** (Ind CP) |
| Dalby | Labor | **Aubrey Slessar** | Godfrey Morgan (CP) | |
| East Toowoomba | Country | James Kane | **Herbert Yeates** (CP) | |
| Enoggera | Labor | **George Taylor** | Ernest Lanham (UAP) | Mabel Matyer (Ind) |
| Fassifern | Country | Peter Nelson | **Alf Muller** (CP) | |
| Fitzroy | Labor | **Jim Clark** | | |
| Fortitude Valley | Labor | **Samuel Brassington** | Ernest Downey (UAP) | |
| Gregory | Independent | George Devries | | **Charles Brown** (Ind) |
| Gympie | Labor | **Thomas Dunstan** | William Kidd (CP); Ronald Witham (UAP) | |
| Hamilton | United Australia | | **Hugh Russell** (UAP) | Bruce Pie (Ind) |
| Herbert | Labor | **Stephen Theodore** | Alfred Moule (CP) | Jack Wells (Ind Soc) |
| Ipswich | Labor | **David Gledson** | John Cantwell (CP) | Merv Welsby (Ind Soc) |
| Isis | Country | William Ivey | **William Brand** (CP) | |
| Ithaca | Labor | **Ned Hanlon** | | Ted Bacon (Ind Soc); Alexander Jolly (Ind) |
| Kelvin Grove | Protestant Labor | Bert Turner | | Richard Hill (Ind UAP); **George Morris** (Ind) |
| Kennedy | Labor | **Cecil Jesson** | Aubrey Jurd (CP) | Florence Milburn (Ind Soc) |
| Keppel | Country | Walter Ingram | **David Daniel** (CP) | |
| Kurilpa | Labor | **Kerry Copley** | Norman Brandon (UAP) | Ruby McGrorty (Ind Soc) |
| Logan | Labor | **John Brown** | Albert Pro-Copis (UAP) | |
| Mackay | Labor | **William Forgan Smith** | | John Mulherin (Ind) |
| Maranoa | Labor | **Charles Conroy** | Leslie Brown (CP) | |
| Maree | Labor | **William King** | Louis Luckins (UAP) | |
| Maryborough | Labor | **David Farrell** | | Robert McDowell (PLP) |
| Merthyr | Labor | **Bill Moore** | Samuel Glassey (UAP) | |
| Mirani | Labor | **Ted Walsh** | Alexander Kippen (CP) | |
| Mundingburra | Labor | **John Dash** | | Doug Olive (Ind Soc); Lionel Parsons (PLP) |
| Murrumba | Country | George Watson | **Frank Nicklin** (CP) | |
| Nanango | Country | Cecil Tracey | **Jim Edwards** (CP) | George Anderson (Ind) |
| Normanby | Labor | **Tom Foley** | | George Hamilton (Ind) |
| Nundah | Labor | **John Hayes** | William Cook (UAP) | |
| Oxley | United Australia | Henry Herbert | **Thomas Nimmo** (UAP) | |
| Port Curtis | Labor | **Tommy Williams** | Geoffrey Nichols (CP) | |
| Rockhampton | Labor | **James Larcombe** | | Robert Nicholls (Ind Soc) |
| Sandgate | Labor | **Roland Hislop** | Eric Decker* (CP); James Fry (UAP) | |
| South Brisbane | Labor | **Vince Gair** | Daniel Rowley (UAP) | |
| Stanley | Country | Jim Hogan | **Duncan MacDonald** (CP) | |
| The Tableland | Labor | **Harry Bruce** | Robert Griffiths (CP) | Jim Slater (Ind Soc) |
| Toowong | Independent UAP | Tom Laws | **Harry Massey** (UAP) | |
| Toowoomba | Labor | **Jack Duggan** | John Leahy (CP) | |
| Townsville | Labor | **George Keyatta** | | |
| Warrego | Labor | **Randolph Bedford** | | |
| Warwick | Labor | **John Healy** | Richard Matthews (CP) | |
| West Moreton | Country | Fred Howman | **Ted Maher** (CP) | |
| Wide Bay | Country | Thomas Thorpe | **Harry Clayton** (CP) | |
| Windsor | Labor | **Herbert Williams** | Neil O'Sullivan (UAP) | Harry Moorhouse (Ind) |
| Wynnum | United Australia | William Laracy | **Bill Dart** (UAP) | Joseph Bailes (Ind Soc) |

== See also ==
- 1941 Queensland state election
- Members of the Queensland Legislative Assembly, 1938–1941
- Members of the Queensland Legislative Assembly, 1941–1944
- List of political parties in Australia
