= Members of the Queensland Legislative Assembly, 1935–1938 =

This is a list of members of the 27th Legislative Assembly of Queensland from 1935 to 1938, as elected at the 1935 state election held on 11 May 1935.

Name	Party	Electorate	Term in office
Randolph Bedford^{[6]}	Labor	Warrego	1923–1941
Roy Bell	CPNP	Stanley	1933–1938
William Brand	CPNP	Isis	1920–1950
Samuel Brassington	Labor	Fortitude Valley	1927–1932, 1933–1950
John Brown	Labor	Logan	1935–1944
Hon Harry Bruce	Labor	The Tableland	1923–1950
Hon Frank Bulcock	Labor	Barcoo	1919–1942
Jim Clark	Labor	Fitzroy	1935–1960
Harry Clayton	CPNP	Wide Bay	1920–1946
Charles Collins^{[4]}	Labor	Bowen	1909–1912, 1915–1936
Harold Collins	Labor	Cook	1935–1957
Charles Conroy	Labor	Maranoa	1920–1944
Hon Frank Cooper	Labor	Bremer	1915–1946
Kerry Copley	Labor	Kurilpa	1932–1949
William Copley	Labor	Bulimba	1932–1938
David Daniel^{[3]}	CPNP	Keppel	1936–1944
Owen Daniel^{[3]}	CPNP	Keppel	1929–1936
John Donnelly	Labor	Wynnum	1935–1938
Hon John Dash	Labor	Mundingburra	1920–1944
William Deacon	CPNP	Cunningham	1920–1943
William Demaine^{[5]}	Labor	Maryborough	1937–1938
Jack Duggan^{[1]}	Labor	Toowoomba	1935–1957, 1958–1969
Thomas Dunstan	Labor	Gympie	1915–1929, 1935–1953
Jim Edwards	CPNP	Nanango	1920–1947
Hon Tom Foley	Labor	Normanby	1919–1960
Robert Funnell^{[2]}	Labor	Brisbane	1932–1936
Vince Gair	Labor	South Brisbane	1932–1960
David Gledson	Labor	Ipswich	1915–1929, 1932–1949
Hon Ned Hanlon	Labor	Ithaca	1926–1952
Ted Hanson	Labor	Buranda	1924–1947
John Hayes	Labor	Nundah	1932–1947
John Healy	Labor	Warwick	1935–1947
Paul Hilton	Labor	Carnarvon	1935–1963
Roland Hislop	Labor	Sandgate	1935–1941
Hon Maurice Hynes	Labor	Townsville	1923–1939
Cecil Jesson	Labor	Kennedy	1935–1960
James Kane	Labor	East Toowoomba	1935–1938
James Keogh	Labor	Merthyr	1932–1940
William King	Labor	Maree	1932–1941
James Larcombe	Labor	Rockhampton	1912–1929, 1932–1956
Evan Llewelyn^{[1]}	Labor	Toowoomba	1925–1929, 1932–1935
Bernard McLean	Labor	Bundaberg	1935–1941
Ted Maher	CPNP	West Moreton	1929–1949
Johnno Mann^{[2]}	Labor	Brisbane	1936–1969
James Maxwell	CPNP	Toowong	1920–1938
Hon Arthur Moore	CPNP	Aubigny	1915–1941
Godfrey Morgan	CPNP	Dalby	1909–1938
Hon John Mullan	Labor	Carpentaria	1908–1912, 1918–1941
Alf Muller	CPNP	Fassifern	1935–1969
Frank Nicklin	CPNP	Murrumba	1932–1968
Thomas Nimmo	CPNP	Oxley	1929–1943
John O'Keefe	Labor	Cairns	1926–1929, 1930–1942
Hon Percy Pease	Labor	Herbert	1920–1940
Tom Plunkett	CPNP	Albert	1929–1957
Hon George Pollock	Labor	Gregory	1915–1939
Bill Power	Labor	Baroona	1935–1960
Ernest Riordan^{[4]}	Labor	Bowen	1936–1944, 1950–1954
Hugh Russell	CPNP	Hamilton	1926–1941
Hon William Forgan Smith	Labor	Mackay	1915–1942
Hon James Stopford^{[5]}	Labor	Maryborough	1915–1936
George Taylor	Labor	Enoggera	1932–1944
Harry Walker	CPNP	Cooroora	1907–1947
Ted Walsh	Labor	Mirani	1935–1947, 1950–1969
Frank Waters	Labor	Kelvin Grove	1932–1938
William Wellington	Labor	Charters Towers	1915–1939
Herbert Williams	Labor	Windsor	1935–1941
Tommy Williams	Labor	Port Curtis	1932–1947

^{1} On 28 November 1935, the Labor member for Toowoomba, Evan Llewelyn, resigned. Labor candidate Jack Duggan won the resulting by-election on 14 December 1935.
^{2} On 3 January 1936, the Labor member for Brisbane, Robert Funnell, died. Labor candidate Johnno Mann won the resulting by-election on 4 April 1936.
^{3} On 5 January 1936, the Country (CPNP) member for Keppel, Owen Daniel, died. Country (CPNP) candidate David Daniel won the resulting by-election on 4 April 1936.
^{4} On 28 March 1936, the Labor member for Bowen, Charles Collins, died. Labor candidate Ernest Riordan won the resulting by-election on 20 June 1936.
^{5} On 30 November 1936, the Labor member for Maryborough, James Stopford, died. Labor candidate William Demaine won the resulting by-election on 27 February 1937.
^{6} The Labor member for Warrego, Randolph Bedford, resigned on 8 September 1937 to contest the federal seat of Maranoa. He was re-elected the resulting by-election on 4 December 1937.

== See also ==
- 1935 Queensland state election
- Forgan Smith Ministry (Labor) (1932–1942)
