= Members of the Queensland Legislative Assembly, 1938–1941 =

This is a list of members of the 28th Legislative Assembly of Queensland from 1938 to 1941, as elected at the 1938 state election held on 2 April 1938.

Name	Party	Electorate	Term in office
Randolph Bedford	Labor	Warrego	1923–1941
William Brand	Country	Isis	1920–1950
Samuel Brassington	Labor	Fortitude Valley	1927–1932, 1933–1950
Charles Brown^{[2]}	Independent	Gregory	1939–1941
John Brown	Labor	Logan	1935–1944
Hon Harry Bruce	Labor	The Tableland	1923–1950
Hon Frank Bulcock	Labor	Barcoo	1919–1942
Jim Clark	Labor	Fitzroy	1935–1960
Harry Clayton	Country	Wide Bay	1920–1946
Harold Collins	Labor	Cook	1935–1957
Charles Conroy	Labor	Maranoa	1920–1944
Hon Frank Cooper	Labor	Bremer	1915–1946
Kerry Copley	Labor	Kurilpa	1932–1949
David Daniel	Country	Keppel	1936–1944
Bill Dart	United Australia	Wynnum	1938–1944
Hon John Dash	Labor	Mundingburra	1920–1944
William Deacon	Country	Cunningham	1920–1943
Jack Duggan	Labor	Toowoomba	1935–1957, 1958–1969
Thomas Dunstan	Labor	Gympie	1915–1929, 1935–1953
Jim Edwards	Country	Nanango	1920–1947
David Farrell	Labor	Maryborough	1938–1953
Hon Tom Foley	Labor	Normanby	1919–1960
Vince Gair	Labor	South Brisbane	1932–1960
Hon David Gledson	Labor	Ipswich	1915–1929, 1932–1949
Hon Ned Hanlon	Labor	Ithaca	1926–1952
Hon Ted Hanson	Labor	Buranda	1924–1947
John Hayes	Labor	Nundah	1932–1947
John Healy	Labor	Warwick	1935–1947
Paul Hilton	Labor	Carnarvon	1935–1963
Roland Hislop	Labor	Sandgate	1935–1941
Hon Maurice Hynes^{[3]}	Labor	Townsville	1923–1939
Cecil Jesson	Labor	Kennedy	1935–1960
Arthur Jones^{[1]}	Labor	Charters Towers	1929–1932, 1939–1960
James Keogh^{[4]}	Labor	Merthyr	1932–1940
George Keyatta^{[3]}	Labor	Townsville	1939–1960
William King	Labor	Maree	1932–1941
Hon James Larcombe	Labor	Rockhampton	1912–1929, 1932–1956
Duncan MacDonald	Country	Stanley	1938–1953
Bernard McLean	Labor	Bundaberg	1935–1941
Ted Maher	Country	West Moreton	1929–1949
Harry Massey	United Australia	Toowong	1938–1944
Johnno Mann	Labor	Brisbane	1936–1969
George Marriott	Labor	Bulimba	1938–1950
Hon Arthur Moore	Country	Aubigny	1915–1941
Bill Moore^{[4]}	Labor	Merthyr	1940–1957
George Morris	Protestant Labor/ Independent	Kelvin Grove	1938–1941
Hon John Mullan	Labor	Carpentaria	1908–1912, 1918–1941
Alf Muller	Country	Fassifern	1935–1969
Frank Nicklin	Country	Murrumba	1932–1968
Thomas Nimmo	United Australia	Oxley	1929–1943
Hon John O'Keefe	Labor	Cairns	1926–1929, 1930–1942
Hon Percy Pease^{[5]}	Labor	Herbert	1920–1940
Tom Plunkett	Country	Albert	1929–1957
Hon George Pollock^{[2]}	Labor	Gregory	1915–1939
Bill Power	Labor	Baroona	1935–1960
Ernest Riordan	Labor	Bowen	1936–1944, 1950–1954
Hugh Russell	United Australia	Hamilton	1926–1941
Aubrey Slessar	Labor	Dalby	1938–1947
Hon William Forgan Smith	Labor	Mackay	1915–1942
George Taylor	Labor	Enoggera	1932–1944
Stephen Theodore^{[5]}	Labor	Herbert	1940–1950
Harry Walker	Country	Cooroora	1907–1947
Hon Ted Walsh	Labor	Mirani	1935–1947, 1950–1969
William Wellington^{[1]}	Labor	Charters Towers	1915–1939
Herbert Williams	Labor	Windsor	1935–1941
Tommy Williams	Labor	Port Curtis	1932–1947
Herbert Yeates	Country	East Toowoomba	1938–1945

^{1} On 2 March 1939, the Labor member for Charters Towers, William Wellington, died. Labor candidate Arthur Jones won the resulting by-election on 27 May 1939.
^{2} On 24 March 1939, the Labor member for Gregory, George Pollock, died. Independent candidate Charles Brown won the resulting by-election on 27 May 1939.
^{3} On 27 March 1939, the Labor member for Townsville, Maurice Hynes, died. Labor candidate George Keyatta won the resulting by-election on 27 May 1939.
^{4} On 31 August 1940, the Labor member for Merthyr, James Keogh, died. Labor candidate Bill Moore won the resulting by-election on 9 November 1940.
^{5} On 17 September 1940, the Labor member for Herbert and Deputy Premier of Queensland, Percy Pease, died. Labor candidate Stephen Theodore won the resulting by-election on 9 November 1940.

== See also ==
- 1938 Queensland state election
- Forgan Smith Ministry (Labor) (1932–1942)
