= 1938 Queensland state election =

Election held in Queensland, Australia

← 1935	2 April 1938	1941 →

All 62 seats in the Legislative Assembly of Queensland 32 Assembly seats were needed for a majority
- Registered: 582,711 ▲6.2%
- Turnout: 539,037 (92.51%) (▼0.20 pp)
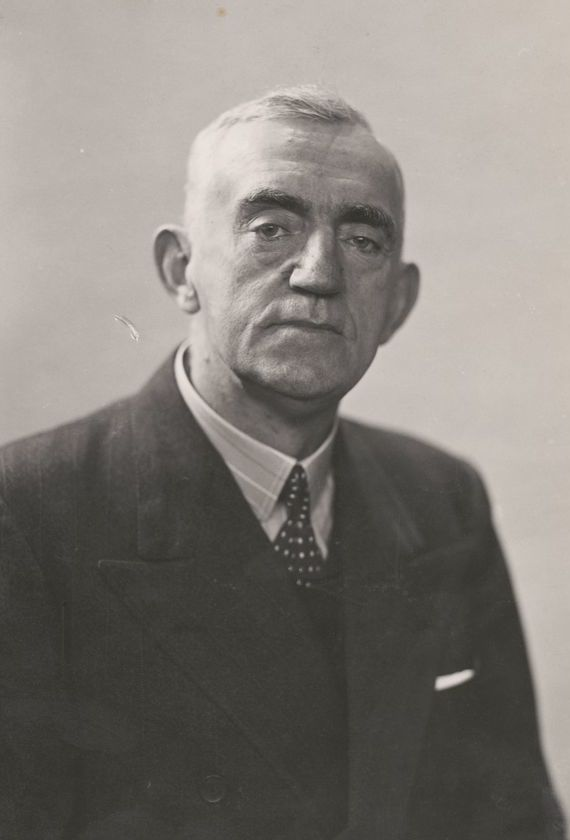

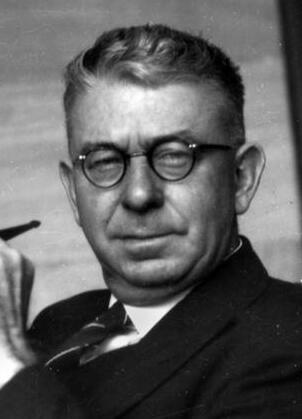

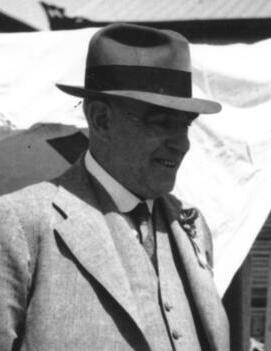
	First party	Second party	Third party
Leader	William Forgan Smith	Ted Maher	Hugh Russell
Party	Labor	Country	United Australia
Leader since	27 May 1929	15 July 1936	July 1936
Leader's seat	Mackay	West Moreton	Hamilton
Last election	46 seats, 53.43%	New party	New party
Seats before	46 seats	13 seats (Note: Seats previously held by members of the Country and Progressive National Party (CPNP).)	3 seats
Seats won	43	14	4
Seat change	▼3	▲1	▲1
Popular vote	250,943	120,469	74,328
Percentage	47.17%	22.65%	13.97%
Swing	▼3.26pp	New party	New party
- Legislative Assembly after the election
Premier before election
William Forgan Smith
Labor
Elected Premier
William Forgan Smith
Labor

Elections were held in the Australian state of Queensland on 2 April 1938 to elect the 62 members of the state's Legislative Assembly. The Labor government of Premier William Forgan Smith was seeking a third term in office. During the previous term, the Country and United Australia parties had emerged from the united Country and Progressive National Party, which had represented conservative forces for over a decade.

The most notable feature of the election campaign was the Protestant Labor Party, established in 1937, which claimed that the Forgan Smith Ministry was disproportionately Catholic and made extravagant claims that three-quarters of all police and public servants in the State were Catholic. Despite the campaign, Labor only lost one seat, Kelvin Grove, to the party.

The unsuccessful Protestant Labor candidate for Ithaca, George Webb, lodged a petition against the return of Labor member Ned Hanlon. He was initially successful in the Supreme Court when the case was heard by Justice E.A. Douglas, who voided the election result on 12 October on the basis of a finding that two men who had acted improperly were Hanlon's agents, but Hanlon appealed to the Full Bench of the Supreme Court and on 16 December 1938, his appeal was allowed. A further appeal by Webb to the High Court was refused leave on 31 March 1939.

== Key dates ==
Date	Event
5 March 1938	The Parliament was dissolved.
7 March 1938	Writs were issued by the Governor to proceed with an election.
14 March 1938	Close of nominations.
2 April 1938	Polling day, between the hours of 8am and 6pm.
12 April 1938	The Forgan Smith Ministry was re-sworn in.
16 April 1938	The poll was retaken in Gregory.
30 April 1938	The writ was returned and the results formally declared.
9 August 1938	Parliament resumed for business.

== Results ==
Legislative Assembly (IRV) – Turnout: 92.51% (CV)
Party	Primary vote			Seats	
Party	Votes	%	Swing (pp)	Seats	Change
Labor	250,943	47.17	–6.26	43	▼3
Country	120,469	22.65	—	14	▲1
United Australia	74,328	13.97	—	4	▲1
Protestant Labour	46,568	8.75	+8.75	1	▲1
Social Credit	27,758	5.22	–1.80	0	Steady
Communist	8,510	1.60	+0.28	0	Steady
Independent	3,403	0.64	–2.73	0	Steady
Total	531,979	100.00		62	Steady
Invalid/blank votes	7,058	1.31	–0.43	—	
Turnout	539,037	92.51	–0.19	—	
Registered voters	582,711	—		—	

Popular vote
Labor	47.17%
Country	22.65%
United Australia	13.97%
Protestant Labor	8.75%
Social Credit	5.22%
Communist	1.60%
Independents	0.64%

Seats
Labor	70.97%
Country	20.97%
United Australia	6.45%
Protestant Labor	1.61%

^{1} 606,559 electors were enrolled to vote at the election, but 3 seats were uncontested—2 Labor seats (4 less than in 1935) representing 15,007 enrolled voters and one Country seat (one less than in 1935) representing 8,841 enrolled voters.

== Seats changing party representation ==
This table lists changes in party representation at the 1938 election.

Seat	Incumbent member	Party	New member	Party
Dalby	Godfrey Morgan	Country	Aubrey Slessar	Labor
East Toowoomba	James Kane	Labor	Herbert Yeates	Country
Kelvin Grove	Frank Waters	Labor	George Morris	Protestant Labor
Toowong	James Maxwell	United Australia	Harry Massey	Independent UAP
Wynnum	John Donnelly	Labor	Bill Dart	United Australia

- Members listed in italics did not recontest their seats.

== See also ==
- Members of the Queensland Legislative Assembly, 1935–1938
- Members of the Queensland Legislative Assembly, 1938–1941
- Candidates of the Queensland state election, 1938
- Forgan Smith Ministry
