= 1941 Queensland state election =

← 1938	29 March 1941	1944 →

All 62 seats in the Legislative Assembly of Queensland 32 Assembly seats were needed for a majority
- Registered: 634,986
- Turnout: 537,247 (84.61%) (Note: Does not include the electorates of Carnarvon, Cooroora, Fitzroy, Townsville and Warrego, all of whom were not contested.)
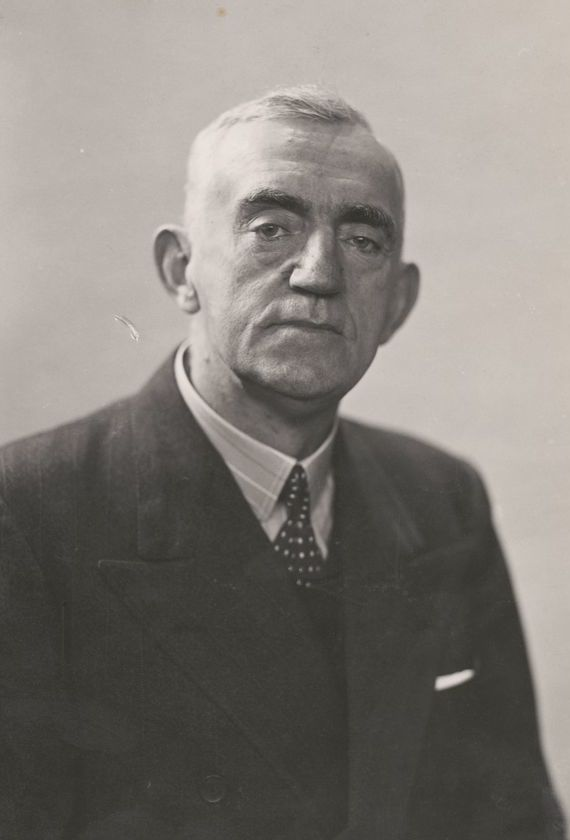

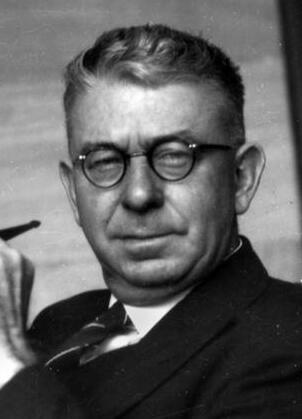

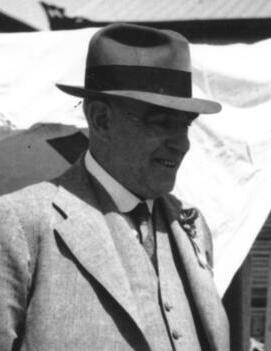
	First party	Second party	Third party
Leader	William Forgan Smith	Ted Maher	Hugh Russell
Party	Labor	Country	United Australia
Leader since	27 May 1929	15 July 1936	July 1936
Leader's seat	Mackay	West Moreton	Hamilton (lost seat)
Last election	43 seats, 47.17%	14 seats, 22.65%	4 seats, 13.97%
Seats won	41	14	4
Seat change	▼2	Steady	Steady
Popular vote	267,216	108,604	81,109
Percentage	49.74%	20.21%	15.10
Swing	▲2.57%	▼2.44%	▲1.13%
- Legislative Assembly after the election
Premier before election
William Forgan Smith
Labor
Elected Premier
William Forgan Smith
Labor

Elections were held in the Australian state of Queensland on 29 March 1941 to elect the 62 members of the state's Legislative Assembly. The Labor government of Premier William Forgan Smith was seeking a fourth term in office.

== Key dates ==
Date	Event
26 February 1941	The Parliament was dissolved.
27 February 1941	Writs were issued by the Governor to proceed with an election.
7 March 1941	Close of nominations.
29 March 1941	Polling day, between the hours of 8am and 6pm.
16 April 1941	The Forgan Smith Ministry was re-sworn in.
26 April 1941	The writ was returned and the results formally declared.

== Results ==
Legislative Assembly (IRV) – Turnout: 84.61%
Party	Primary vote			Seats	
Party	Votes	%	Swing (pp)	Seats	Change
Labor	267,216	49.74	+2.57	41	▼2
Country	108,604 (Note: Includes votes for one candidate for Cunningham (William Deacon) whom was an Independent Country candidate.)	20.21	–2.44	14	Steady
United Australia	81,109 (Note: Includes one candidate whom ran as an Independent-UAP (Kelvin Grove).)	15.10	+1.13	4	Steady
Independent Socialist	10,561	1.97	+1.97	0	Steady
Independent Democrat	10,406	1.94	+1.94	2	▲2
Protestant Labour	9,038	1.68	–7.07	0	▼1
Andrew Fisher Labor	5,476	1.02	+1.02	1	▲1
Communist	5,383	1.00	–0.60	0	Steady
Independent	21,844	4.07	+3.43	0	Steady
Total	537,247	100.00		62	Steady
Invalid/blank votes	10,803	2.11	+0.80	—	
Turnout	537,247	84.61	–7.9	—	
Registered voters	634,986	—		—	

Popular vote
Labor	50.76%
Country	20.21%
United Australia	15.10%
Ind. Socialist	1.97%
Ind. Democrat	1.94%
Protestant Labour	1.68%
Communist	1.00%
Independents	4.07%

Seats
Labor	67.74%
Country	22.58%
United Australia	6.45%
Ind. Democrat	3.23%

== Seats changing party representation ==
This table lists changes in party representation at the 1941 election.

Seat	Incumbent member	Party	New member	Party
Bundaberg	Bernard McLean	Labor	Frank Barnes	Andrew Fisher Labor
Cunningham	William Deacon	Country	William Deacon	Independent Country
Gregory	Charles Brown	Independent	George Devries	Labor
Hamilton	Hugh Russell	United Australia	Bruce Pie	Independent Democrat
Kelvin Grove	George Morris	Independent	Bert Turner	Labor
Maree	William King	Labor	Louis Luckins	United Australia
Sandgate	Roland Hislop	Labor	Eric Decker	Country
Toowong	Harry Massey	Independent UAP	Harry Massey	United Australia
Windsor	Herbert Williams	Labor	Harry Moorhouse	Independent Democrat

- The incumbent member for Gregory, Charles Brown won this seat from Labor at the 1939 by-election.

== See also ==
- Members of the Queensland Legislative Assembly, 1938–1941
- Members of the Queensland Legislative Assembly, 1941–1944
- Candidates of the Queensland state election, 1941
- Forgan Smith Ministry
