= Bert Turner (politician) =

Australian politician

Member of the Queensland Legislative Assembly for Kelvin Grove
- In office 29 March 1941 – 3 August 1957
- Preceded by: George Morris
- Succeeded by: Douglas Tooth

Personal details
- Born: John Albert Turner; 26 March 1888 Brisbane, Queensland, Australia
- Died: 5 April 1973 (aged 85) Brisbane, Queensland, Australia
- Party: Labor
- Spouse: Annie Hunter Horsburgh (m.1915 d.1969)
- Occupation: Fireman

John Albert "Bert" Turner (26 March 1888 – 5 April 1973) was a member of the Queensland Legislative Assembly.

== Biography ==
Turner was born in Brisbane, Queensland, the son of William Riggen Turner and his wife Lucy (née Brinkley). He was educated at Milton State School and after finishing his education joined the fire brigade in 1906.

He married Annie Hunter Horsburgh on 9 January 1915 (died 1969) and they had two daughters. He died in April 1973 and willed his body to the School of Anatomy at Queensland University for medical research and was later cremated.

== Public career ==
Turner was a founder and the first secretary of the Queensland Fire Brigade Union before becoming an organiser with the Motor Drivers and Motor Mechanics Union. He then was an organiser with the Queensland Storemen and Packers Union from 1924 to 1941. He was a (ALP) founder and president of the Labor Ashgrove Jubilee Branch in 1927.

He won the seat of Kelvin Grove at the 1941 Queensland state elections and held it till his defeat by the Liberal Party's Doug Tooth in 1957.

Parliament of Queensland
Preceded by George Morris	Member for Kelvin Grove; 1941–1957	Succeeded by Douglas Tooth
