= Richard Hill (Queensland politician) =

Australian politician

Member of the Queensland Legislative Assembly for Kelvin Grove
- In office 11 May 1929 – 11 June 1932
- Preceded by: William Lloyd
- Succeeded by: Frank Waters

Personal details
- Born: Richard Hill; 21 August 1885 Kelvin Grove, Queensland, Australia
- Died: 26 September 1959 (aged 74) Redcliffe, Queensland, Australia
- Party: CPNP
- Spouse(s): Laura May McKee (m.1917 d.1942), Williamina Euphemia Low (m.1945 d.1948), Anita Amy Frost (m.1950)
- Occupation: Coach builder

Richard Hill (21 August 1885 - 26 September 1959) was a coach builder and member of the Queensland Legislative Assembly.

== Biography ==
Hill was born in Kelvin Grove, Queensland, to parents William John Hill and his wife Julia (née Lock). He was educated at Kelvin Grove State School and Kelly's Private College. Upon leaving school he worked in the family's coach building business.

Hill was married three times, firstly to Laura May McKee in 1917 (died 1942), then Williamina Euphemia Low in 1945 (died 1948), and lastly to Anita Amy Frost in 1950. He died in September 1959 and was cremated at the Mt Thompson Crematorium.

== Public career ==
Hill was the CPNP member for Kelvin Grove from 1929 until 1932. He was a member of the Kelvin Grove School Committee and Progress Association and a member of the council of the RNA for over thirty years.

He was also the ringmaster at the Brisbane Show from 1945 until 1959 and a judge for the Brisbane and Ipswich Amateur Turf Club at Doomben, Albion Park and Bundamba.

Parliament of Queensland
Preceded by William Lloyd	Member for Kelvin Grove; 1929–1932	Succeeded by Frank Waters
