= Andrew Thompson (politician) =

Australian politician

Member of the Queensland Legislative Assembly for Wide Bay
- In office 16 March 1918 – 9 October 1920
- Preceded by: Charles Booker
- Succeeded by: Ernest Clayton

Personal details
- Born: Andrew Thompson; 9 July 1883 Tiaro, Queensland, Australia
- Died: 15 January 1961 (aged 77) Nambour, Queensland, Australia
- Resting place: Nambour Garden Lawn Cemetery
- Party: Labor
- Spouse: Lilias Nahrung
- Occupation: Dairy farmer

Andrew Thompson (1884 – 15 January 1961) was an Australian politician. He was the Labor member for Wide Bay in the Legislative Assembly of Queensland from 1918 to 1920.

Thompson died in 1961 and was buried in Nambour Garden Lawn Cemetery.

Parliament of Queensland
Preceded by Charles Booker	Member for Wide Bay; 1918–1920	Succeeded by Ernest Clayton
