= Godfrey Morgan (Australian politician) =

Australian politician (1875–1957)

The Hon Godfrey Morgan
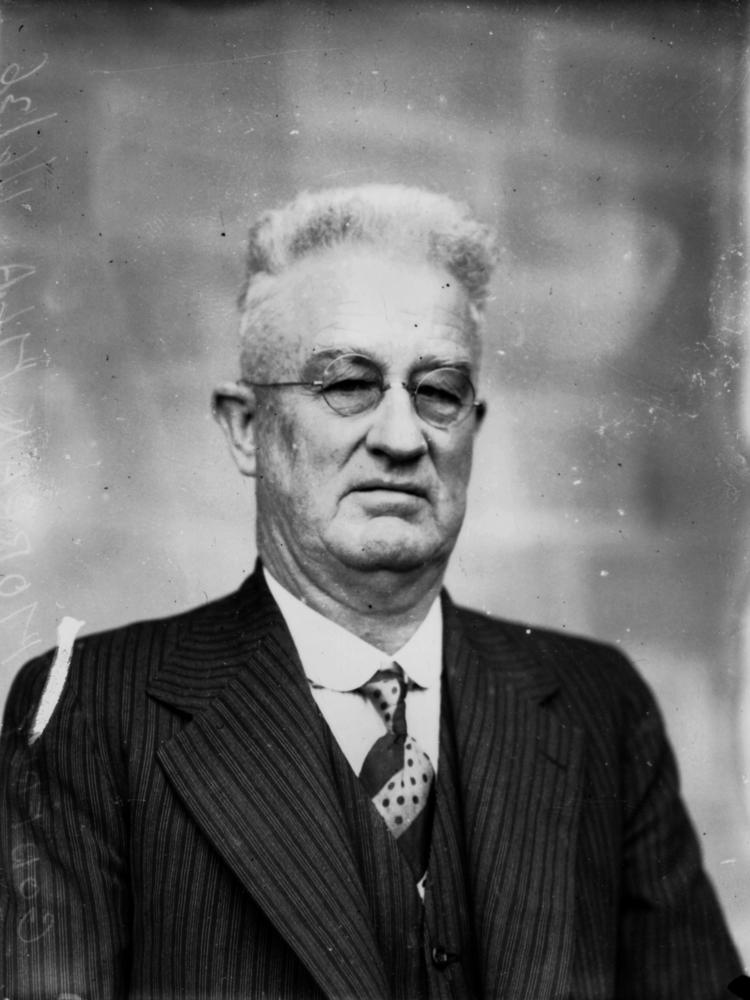
- Godfrey Morgan in 1936.

Member of the Queensland Legislative Assembly for Murilla
- In office 2 October 1909 – 11 May 1935
- Preceded by: William Moore

Member of the Queensland Legislative Assembly for Dalby
- In office 11 May 1935 – 2 April 1938
- Preceded by: Walter Sparkes
- Succeeded by: Aubrey Slessar

Personal details
- Born: 29 July 1875 Landsborough, Victoria, Australia
- Died: 29 August 1957 (aged 82) Brisbane, Queensland
- Party: Country Party
- Other political affiliations: Country and Progressive National Party, Ministerial
- Spouse: Annie Jane Pace
- Occupation: Grazier

Godfrey Morgan (1 July 1875 – 29 August 1957) was an Australian journalist, politician, and farmer. He served on the Legislative Assembly of Queensland from 1909 until 1938, first for the electoral district of Murilla and then for the electoral district of Dalby.

== Biography ==
Godfrey Morgan was born on 29 July 1875 in Landsborough, Victoria, Australia, to Godrey Morgan, a newspaperman and printer, and Mary Elizabeth Morgan, née Williamson. When Morgan was young his father began a newspaper at Donald, Victoria, and when his father died in 1891, Morgan took over management of the paper. On 8 December 1896, he married Annie Jane Pace.

In 1908, after the government of Queensland requested settlers to come help fight a prickly pear infestation, the Morgan family moved to a 7000-acre plot of land named Arubial, on the Condamine River near Condamine.

In 1909 Morgan was elected first to the Murilla Shire Council and then to the Legislative Assembly of Queensland, representing the seat of Murilla. When Murilla was abolished in 1935, he represented the seat Dalby till he was defeated by 57 votes in the 1938 state election.

When A.E. Moore came to power in 1929, Morgan served as Secretary for Railways till 1932 and then as Minister for Transport till the government's defeat in the 1932 state election.

Two of Morgan's sons, Godfrey Morgan Jnr and Methuen Morgan, also had an interest in politics.

Godfrey Morgan Jnr, an Australasian amateur lightweight boxing champion, served as the chairman of Murilla Shire from 1936 to 1946. He also served as the vice-president of the Queensland Local Government Association. He unsuccessfully contested for his father's old state seat of Dalby as the endorsed Country Party candidate in the 1941 Queensland state election. In 1971, he authored his autobiography entitled We are borne as a river: My first seventy years where among other things, he detailed his and his family's involvement in politics.

Methuen Morgan was elected as a councillor on Murilla Shire Council in 1933, and became deputy chairman in 1943. He finally became chairman of Murilla Shire in 1946 and served in the position until 1958.

== Later years ==
Morgan moved to Brisbane after his 1938 election loss and died there in 1957. He was accorded a State funeral and was cremated.

== Legacy ==
The locality of Morganville in the North Burnett Region and the rural town of Glenmorgan in the Western Downs Region are named after him.

A monument commemorating the achievements of Godfrey Morgan and his sons Godfrey Morgan Jnr and Methuen Morgan was officially unveiled at the Miles Historical Village on 3 September 1983 by Murilla Shire chairman Duncan Sturrock.

Parliament of Queensland
Preceded by William Moore	Member for Murilla; 1909 – 1935	Abolished
Preceded by Walter Sparkes	Member for Dalby; 1935 – 1938	Succeeded by Aubrey Slessar
