= Frank Waters (politician) =

Australian politician

Member of the Queensland Legislative Assembly for Kelvin Grove
- In office 11 June 1932 – 2 April 1938
- Preceded by: Richard Hill
- Succeeded by: George Morris

Personal details
- Born: Francis John Waters; 10 August 1907 Hastings, New Zealand
- Died: 6 August 1990 (aged 82) Brisbane, Queensland, Australia
- Party: Labor
- Spouse: Jessie Kate Robertson (m.1930 d.1985)
- Occupation: Telegraph messenger

Francis John Waters (10 August 1907 – 6 August 1990), commonly referred to as F. J. Waters, was a telegraph messenger and trade unionist who became a member of the Queensland Legislative Assembly.

== Biography ==
Waters was born in Hastings, New Zealand, the son of John Thomas Waters (born Hamilton, Victoria c. 1877; died 7 June 1938) and his wife Margaret (née McGrath). His education began at St Patrick's Convent in Auckland and in 1916 he left New Zealand and carried on his schooling at St Mary's Convent in New South Wales before finishing his education in Queensland at South Johnstone, Selwyn, and Kuridala State Schools. On leaving school he became a telegraph messenger, working for the PMG from 1922 to 1932 and then was a canvasser for new telephone subscribers.

He served in World War II, joining the Australian Military Forces in 1942 and rising to the rank of Sergeant in the Queensland Echelon and Records Section of Army Records.

On 24 June 1930, Waters married Jessie Kate Robertson (c. 1902 – 9 June 1985); they had two sons and one daughter. In 1985 he was appointed a Member of the Order of Australia for service to the trade union movement. Waters died in September 1990 and was cremated at Albany Creek Crematorium.

== Public career ==
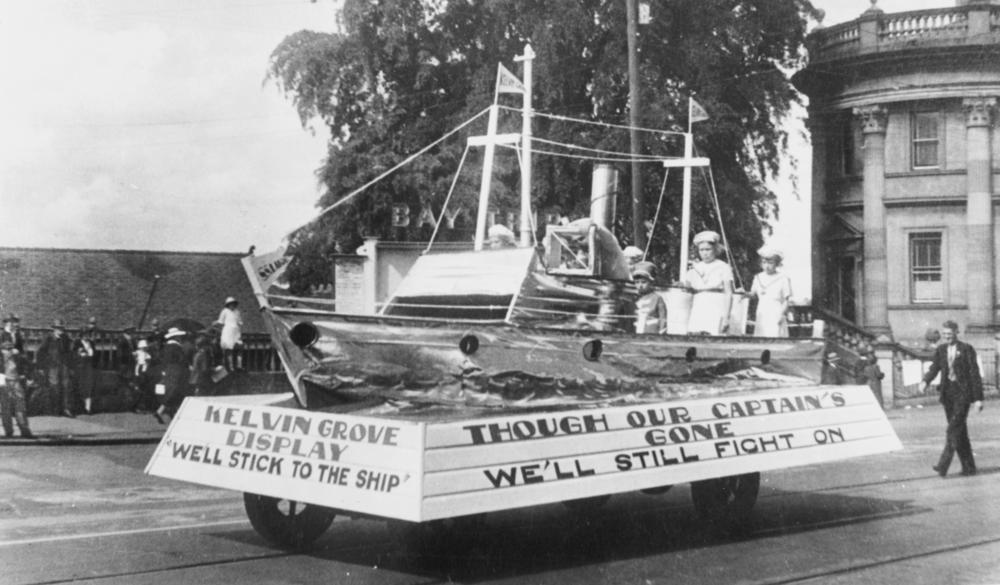

Waters held many roles in the Amalgamated Postal Workers Union (Queensland branch) and the Queensland trade union movement both before and after his time in the Queensland Parliament.

In June 1932, as the Labor candidate, he won the seat of Kelvin Grove, easily defeating the sitting member, Richard Hill. He held Kelvin Grove for 6 years before losing in 1938 to the only Protestant Labor Party member to sit in the Queensland Parliament, George Morris.

In 1941, after several well-publicised clashes with Premier Forgan Smith, Waters lost endorsement for the seat of Kelvin Grove. The following year he was stripped of his party membership over a row involving his stance on medical aid to Russia. His membership was not restored until 1957. The Frank Waters Park, located in Ashgrove, was named in his honour.

He was president of the Queensland branch of the Australian Legion of Ex-Servicemen in 1948. In that year he sued the Brisbane Telegraph for libel.

He was, in September 1949, a charter member of the Australian Peace Council.

Parliament of Queensland
Preceded by Richard Hill	Member for Kelvin Grove; 1932–1938	Succeeded by George Morris
