= George Keyatta =

Australian politician

Member of the Queensland Legislative Assembly for Townsville
- In office 27 May 1939 – 28 May 1960
- Preceded by: Maurice Hynes
- Succeeded by: Seat abolished

Personal details
- Born: George Keyatta; 20 December 1895 Townsville, Queensland, Australia
- Died: 25 August 1962 (aged 66) Brisbane, Queensland, Australia
- Party: Labor
- Spouse: Emily Mary McMenamin (m.1947 d.1992)
- Occupation: Wharf labourer

George Keyatta (20 December 1895 – 25 August 1962) was a member of the Queensland Legislative Assembly.

== Biography ==
Keyatta was born in Townsville, Queensland, the son of Gabriel Annick Keyatta and his wife Annie (née Sorotti) and was educated at Townsville West State School and St Mary's Convent School. Upon leaving school he was a painter and wharf labourer.

In 1947 he married Emily Mary McMenamin. Keyatta died in August 1962.

== Public career ==
Keyatta was an alderman with the Townsville City Council from 1929 to 1935. When the member for Townsville, Maurice Hynes died in March 1939, Keyatta, representing the Labor Party, won the resulting by-election, defeating his three opponents, all of them being barristers. He went on to represent the electorate until the 1960 Queensland state election when he retired from politics on medical advice.

As well being the state member for Townsville, Keyatta sat on several other boards. He was a member of the Townsville Harbour Board from 1935 to 1960, the Agricultural, Pastoral and Industrial Association since 1928, and the Townsville Sports Ground Reserve Committee. He was a life-member of the Townsville Rugby Football League and the Townsville branch of the ANA. Keyatta was also the vice-president of the Queensland branch of the Australia-Russia Association from 1941 to 1944. Keyatta Park in Townsville was named in his honour.

Parliament of Queensland
Preceded by Maurice Hynes	Member for Townsville; 1939–1960	Abolished
