= Maurice Hynes =

Australian politician

The Hon Maurice Hynes
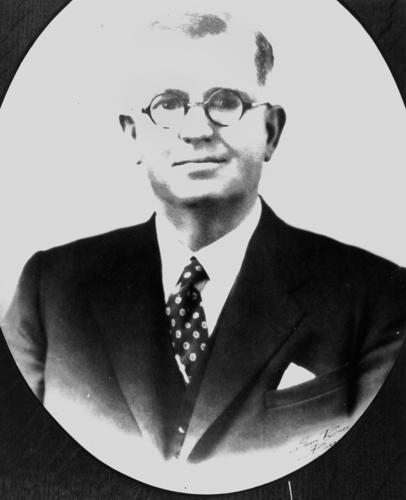

Member of the Queensland Legislative Assembly for Townsville
- In office 12 May 1923 – 27 March 1939
- Preceded by: William Green
- Succeeded by: George Keyatta

Personal details
- Born: Maurice Patrick Hynes; 29 September 1886 Mackay, Queensland, Australia
- Died: 27 March 1939 (aged 52) Brisbane, Queensland, Australia
- Resting place: Toowong Cemetery
- Party: Labor
- Spouse: Margaret Josephine Hennessey (m.1907 d.1964)
- Occupation: Trade union organiser, labourer

Maurice Patrick "Mossy" Hynes (29 September 1886 – 27 March 1939) was an Australian politician.

He worked in northern and western Queensland as a railway worker, stockman and waterfront labourer before moving to Mackay where he became a sugar industry worker.

He was the Labor member for Townsville in the Legislative Assembly of Queensland from 1923 to 1939. He was also Secretary of Labour and Industry from 1932 to 1939 in William Forgan Smith's government.

Hynes died in 1939. He was accorded a state funeral which proceeded from St Stephen's Cathedral to the Toowong Cemetery.

Parliament of Queensland
Preceded by William Green	Member for Townsville; 1923–1939	Succeeded by George Keyatta
