= George Morris (Australian politician) =

Australian politician (1892–1967)

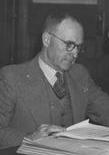

Member of the Legislative Assembly for Kelvin Grove
- In office 2 April 1938 – 29 March 1941
- Preceded by: Frank Waters
- Succeeded by: Bert Turner

Personal details
- Born: George Alfred Morris; 15 July 1892 Sydney, Colony of New South Wales
- Died: 18 May 1967 (aged 74) Greenslopes, Queensland, Australia
- Party: Protestant Labour
- Spouse: Gladys Winifred Clark (m. 1915–1967)
- Children: 3
- Education: Glebe Public School

Military service
- Allegiance: Australia
- Branch/service: Royal Australian Navy
- Years of service: 1913–1923
- Rank: Chief petty officer
- Battles/wars: World War I

George Alfred Morris (15 July 1892 – 18 May 1967) was a member of the Queensland Legislative Assembly. He was the only member of the Protestant Labor Party to hold a seat in the Queensland Parliament.

== Biography ==
Morris was born in Sydney, New South Wales, the son of William Boyd Morris and his wife Emily Jane (née Finney). He was educated at Glebe Public School, Sydney and after leaving school he enlisted with the Royal Australian Navy and was stationed at the Haslar Naval Hospital in Portsmouth, England, and from 1915-1918 was on HMAS Australia as a sick-berth attendant. He left the navy in 1923 was in show business from 1928 to 1938.

He rejoined the navy when World War II broke out, being based at the Flinders Naval Hospital & Balmoral Depot, Rushcutters Bay, and at Leeuwin in Western Australia. By the time he was discharged in 1944 Morris was based at HMAS Moreton. From 1948 to 1964 he was the secretary of the Queensland Taxi Cab Owner-Drivers' Association.

Morris captained the first Victorian Rugby Union team to play South Africa and was a welterweight boxing champion. He was a member of the ANZAC club, and of the Ashgrove Returned Sailors, Soldiers and Airmen's Imperial League of Australia (RSSAILA). He captained the Queensland Diggers XI in 1937 and was a life member of the Newmarket Bowling Club.

On 16 July 1915 Morris married Gladys Winifred Clark (died 1971) in England and they had two sons and one daughter. He died May 1967 at Greenslopes and was cremated at the Albany Creek Crematorium.

== Public career ==
Morris was a member of the Protestant Labor Party, a party formed in the 1920s to counter the perceived Roman Catholic dominance of the Labor. At the Queensland state election of 1938, he contested the seat of Kelvin Grove and defeated the sitting member, Frank Waters.

When World War II broke out, he received a leave of absence from parliament to rejoin the Navy. By the time the Queensland state election of 1941 came around, Morris was an independent with the Protestant Labor Party all but wound up. He was defeated at that election by the Labor candidate, John Turner.

Parliament of Queensland
Preceded by Frank Waters	Member for Kelvin Grove; 1938–1941	Succeeded by Bert Turner
