= Thomas Nimmo =

Australian politician

Member of the Queensland Legislative Assembly for Oxley
- In office 11 May 1929 – 6 February 1943
- Preceded by: Cecil Elphinstone
- Succeeded by: Tom Kerr

Personal details
- Born: Thomas Nimmo; 27 July 1879 Ipswich, Queensland, Australia
- Died: 6 February 1943 (aged 63) Corinda, Queensland, Australia
- Party: UAP
- Other political affiliations: CPNP
- Spouse: Margaret Wright (m.1903 d.1958)
- Occupation: Businessman

Thomas Nimmo (27 July 1879 – 6 February 1943) was a member of the Queensland Legislative Assembly.

== Biography ==
Nimmo was born at Ipswich, Queensland, the son of Andrew Nimmo and his wife Agnes (née Reilly). He was educated at the Ipswich State School and on leaving he worked as a shop assistant at Cribb and Foote in Ipswich before taking up business interests including as a director of the Queensland Woolen Mills and the Queensland Deposit Bank, and owning his own retail drapery business at North Ipswich.

On 25 November 1903 he married Margaret Wright (died 1958) in Brisbane and together had one son and three daughters. Thomas Nimmo died on 6 February 1943 and was cremated at Mt Thompson Crematorium.

== Public life ==
Nimmo, a member of the CPNP, won the seat of Oxley in the Queensland Legislative Assembly in 1929. He held it until he died in 1943.

Parliament of Queensland
Preceded by Cecil Elphinstone	Member for Oxley; 1929–1943	Succeeded by Tom Kerr
