= Aubrey Slessar =

Australian politician

Member of the Queensland Legislative Assembly for Dalby
- In office 2 April 1938 – 3 May 1947
- Preceded by: Godfrey Morgan
- Succeeded by: Charles Russell

Personal details
- Born: Aubrey Robert Slessar; 5 November 1899 Cowra, New South Wales, Australia
- Died: 2 December 1973 (aged 74) Sunnybank, Queensland, Australia
- Party: Labor
- Spouse: Alma Frances Price (m.1928 d.1972)
- Occupation: Managing director

Aubrey Robert Slessar (5 November 1899 – 2 December 1973) was a managing director and member of the Queensland Legislative Assembly.

== Biography ==
Slessar was born at Cowra, New South Wales, to parents Joseph Slessar and his wife Beatrice Annie (née Potts). He went to school at Sunbury State School in Victoria and studied electrical and mechanical engineering in Sydney. He came to Queensland with his parents when he was six years old and moved to Chinchilla ten years later.

He worked for Chrysler Cars in 1925-1926 and in 1928 became the country representative for Winchcombe Carson Pty Ltd. In 1928, Slessar established a motor and general machinery agency in Chinchilla and in 1930 he became stock and station agent. From 1936 until 1969 he was the managing director of Slessar and Co. with branch offices in Miles and Brigalow. For many years he was also an auctioneer in Chinchilla.

He sold his business in 1969 and following the death of his wife in 1972, moved to Sunnybank, Brisbane to live with his sister. Slessar was deeply involved with the Masonic movement and reached the 31st degree. There are only 33 degrees in the movement. He was the Past Master of the Grand Lodge of Queensland. He was also involved in many other organisations in the Chinchilla area - The local race club, the Chamber of Commerce, the Agriculture and Pastoralists Association and the Chinchilla football club to name but a few.

On 24 July 1928 Slessar married Alma Frances Price and they remained childless. He was ill for the last six months of his life and died in 1973 at Sunnybank. His body was taken back to Chinchilla for his funeral at St Andrew's Presbyterian Church.

== Political career ==
Slessar, for Labor, won the seat of Dalby in the Queensland Legislative Assembly at the 1941 state election. He defeated the 39-year veteran of Queensland Parliament, Godfrey Morgan by just 57 votes.

He remained the member until his retirement from politics in 1947. He was the only Labor member for Dalby in its 76-year history.

Parliament of Queensland
Preceded by Godfrey Morgan	Member for Dalby; 1938–1947	Succeeded by Charles Russell
