= James Kane (politician) =

Australian politician

Member of the Queensland Legislative Assembly for East Toowoomba
- In office 11 May 1935 – 2 Apr 1938
- Preceded by: James Annand
- Succeeded by: Herbert Yeates

Personal details
- Born: 22 July 1894 Hodgson Vale, Queensland
- Died: 8 April 1964 (aged 69) Kedron Brisbane, Queensland
- Resting place: Nudgee Cemetery
- Party: Labor

James David Kane (11 May 1895 – 8 April 1964) was an Australian politician. He was the Labor member for East Toowoomba in the Legislative Assembly of Queensland from 1935 to 1938.

Kane died in 1964 and was buried in Nudgee Cemetery.

Parliament of Queensland
Preceded by James Annand	East Toowoomba; 1935 – 1938	Succeeded by Herbert Yeates
