= Bernard McLean =

Australian politician

Member of the Queensland Legislative Assembly for Bundaberg
- In office 11 May 1935 – 29 May 1941
- Preceded by: George Barber
- Succeeded by: Frank Barnes

Personal details
- Born: Bernard McLean; 1 May 1884 Maryborough, Queensland, Australia
- Died: 11 December 1955 (aged 71) Brisbane, Queensland, Australia
- Party: Labor
- Spouse: Gertrude Lewis (m.1909 d.1969)
- Occupation: Railway guard

Bernard McLean (1 May 1884 – 11 December 1955) was a member of the Queensland Legislative Assembly.

== Biography ==
McLean was born at Maryborough, Queensland, the son of Bernard McLean Snr and his wife Mary Ann (née Orr). He was educated at Maryborough Central State School and Maryborough Grammar School before working as a miner in the district. From 1909 until 1936 he worked for the Queensland Railways as a railway guard.

On the 3rd Nov 1909 McLean married Gertrude Lewis (died 1969) and together had a son and two daughters. He died in Brisbane in December 1955.

== Public career ==
Following the retirement of the long-serving George Barber at the 1935 Queensland state election, McLean, a fellow Labor Party member, won the seat of Bundaberg in the Queensland Legislative Assembly. He represented the electorate for six years, losing in 1941 to the Andrew Fisher Labourite, Frank Barnes.

Parliament of Queensland
Preceded by George Barber	Member for Bundaberg; 1935–1941	Succeeded by Frank Barnes
