= Alf Müller =

Australian dairy farmer and politician

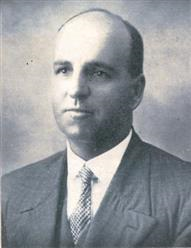

Member of the Queensland Legislative Assembly for Fassifern
- In office 11 May 1935 – 17 May 1969
- Preceded by: Arnold Wienholt
- Succeeded by: Selwyn Muller

Personal details
- Born: Adolf Gustav Müller; 1 May 1889 Boonah, Colony of Queensland
- Died: 1 August 1970 (aged 81) Boonah, Queensland, Australia
- Resting place: Kalbar General Cemetery
- Party: Country
- Other political affiliations: Independent
- Spouse: Annie Lobegeiger (m. 1910)
- Children: Selwyn
- Occupation: Dairy farmer

Adolf Gustav Müller (1 May 1889 – 1 August 1970), referred to as Alf Müller, was an Australian dairy farmer and member of the Queensland Legislative Assembly.

== Biography ==
Muller was born in Boonah, Queensland, to parents Johannes Muller and his wife Louisa Rosina (née Kubler) and attended Kalbar and Templin State Schools. He became a dairy farmer in the Boonah district, where he lived all his life.

He was a member of many agricultural boards including the State Butter Board, Australian Dairy Producers' Export Board, and the Queensland Cooperative Dairy Companies Association. He was also President of the Queensland Branch of the Clydesdale Horse Society and a Freemason.

On 12 January 1910 Muller married Annie Lobegeiger (died 1970) and together had one son and three daughters. Muller was accorded a state funeral upon his death and during the condolence motion in Parliament, his son Selwyn said the advice his father gave him upon winning Fassifern was "Use your common sense. If you have anything worthwhile to say, have the courage to say it; if you wish to comment but are not aware of the facts, remain silent". He was buried in the Kalbar General Cemetery.

== Political career ==
Muller was a councillor and chairman on both the Boonah Shire Council and Goolman Shire Council before his entry into state politics.

Muller represented the state seat of Fassifern from 1935 until 1969 when he was eighty years old. He started out as a member of the Country Party but in 1961 he resigned from the party due to differences he had with the rest of the Cabinet. It was stated at the time that these differences related to transactions Muller had with the Income Tax Department. He sat as an Independent Country member until October 1965 when he rejoined the party.

He was Deputy Leader of the Opposition from 1949 until 1957 and the Minister for Public Lands and Irrigation from 1957 until 1960. When he retired as the member for Fassifern, his son Selwyn took over the seat.

Parliament of Queensland
Preceded by Arnold Wienholt	Member for Fassifern; 1935–1969	Succeeded by Selwyn Muller
