= Electoral district of Toowoomba =

Coordinates: 27°34′34.3″S 151°56′47.74″E

Toowoomba Queensland—Legislative Assembly
- State: Queensland
- Dates current: 1873-1878, 1912-1960
- Namesake: Toowoomba

Toowoomba was an electoral district of the Legislative Assembly in the Australian state of Queensland. The seat was in Toowoomba.

== History ==
The seat had two incarnations. The first was from 1873 to 1878 and the second from 1912 to 1960.

In 1873, it was created by renaming the electoral district of Drayton & Toowoomba. In 1878, its name was changed back to Drayton & Toowoomba (but as a 2-member constituency).

Its second incarnation began in 1912 when Drayton & Toowoomba split into Toowoomba, East Toowoomba and Drayton. The sitting member for Drayton & Toowoomba, James Tolmie, successfully stood for election in Toowoomba in 1912 after the split.

Toowoomba was abolished in the 1960 redistribution. The sitting member, Mervyn Anderson, successfully stood for election in the new seat of Toowoomba East in the 1960 election.

== Members for Toowoomba ==
The members who represented Toowoomba are listed below.

First incaranation
Member	Party	Term
William Henry Groom	Opposition	1873–1878

Second incarnation
Member	Party	Term
James Tolmie	Liberal	1912–1918
Frank Brennan	Labor	1918–1925
Evan Llewelyn	Labor	1925–1929
James Annand	Country	1929–1932
Evan Llewelyn	Labor	1932–1935
Jack Duggan	Labor	1935–1957
Mervyn Anderson	Liberal	1957–1960

== See also ==
- Electoral districts of Queensland
- Members of the Queensland Legislative Assembly by year
- Category:Members of the Queensland Legislative Assembly by name
