= Electoral district of The Tableland =

The Tableland Queensland—Legislative Assembly
- State: Queensland
- Dates current: 1932–1950
- Namesake: Atherton Tableland
- Demographic: Rural
- Coordinates: 17°05′S 145°25′E

The Tableland was a Legislative Assembly electorate in the state of Queensland, Australia.

== History ==
The Tableland was created in the 1931 redistribution, taking effect at the 1932 state election. It was based in the Atherton Tableland, west of Cairns.

The Tableland was abolished at the 1950 state election, the eastern portion forming the newly recreated district of Mulgrave and the remainder forming part of the enlarged new Electoral district of Tablelands.

== Members ==
The following people were elected in the seat of The Tableland:

Member	Party	Term
Harry Bruce	Labor	Jun 1932 – Apr 1950

Bruce earlier represented the Electoral district of Kennedy 1923–1932.

== See also ==
- Electoral districts of Queensland
- Members of the Queensland Legislative Assembly by year
- Category:Members of the Queensland Legislative Assembly by name
