= George Cuthbert Taylor =

Australian politician

George Taylor

Member of the Queensland Legislative Assembly for Enoggera
- In office 11 Jun 1932 – 15 Apr 1944
- Preceded by: James Kerr
- Succeeded by: Kenneth Morris

Personal details
- Born: George Cuthbert Taylor; 14 February 1886 Warrnambool, Victoria, Australia
- Died: 2 January 1957 (aged 70) Brisbane, Queensland, Australia
- Party: Independent
- Other political affiliations: Labor
- Spouse: Hilda Ward (m.1915)
- Occupation: Shearer

George Cuthbert Taylor (14 February 1886 – 2 January 1957) was a shearer and member of the Queensland Legislative Assembly.

== Biography ==
Taylor was born in Victorian seaside town of Warrnambool, to parents William Walker Taylor and his wife Isabella (née Drever). His family was impoverished due to his father's drinking. He attended Hamilton State School until 1898 whereupon he began his working life, eventually becoming a shearer, working across Victoria, South Australia, New South Wales and Queensland. He joined the AWU in 1902, eventually becoming an organiser for the union in Adelaide from 1909 until 1911.

1912 saw him working as a miner in Ballarat and Broken Hill and in 1914 he served in the AIF including at Gallipoli where he was wounded and subsequently discharged in 1915. In 1918 he joined the Labor Party and acquired a reputation as a soapbox orator who spoke on topics, usually involving political theory, economics and rationalism, in great detail and with utmost seriousness.

In 1919 he was involved in the Merivale Street riots where returned soldiers clashed with Russians and trade unionists. He was one of the 15 charged under War Precautions Act for publicly displaying a red flag at the 'International Socialist' march in contravention of a prohibition made by the then Minister for Defence. He appealed his conviction to the Supreme Court of Queensland where he was represented by the Queensland Premier, T. J. Ryan. Although the court found in favour of the commonwealth, on that same day all the prisoners were released under a general amnesty granted to mark the official declaration of peace.

His appeal was the start of a close friendship with Ryan, which was instrumental in Taylor securing a position in the Public Service as a clerk in the Tourist Bureau. This appointment was a stepping stone to his eventual entry into state politics, as it gave him more time to devote to his political career. He was also a member of the Freemasons and president of the Returned Soldiers Labour League.

In 1915 he married Hilda Ward at Broken Hill and together had one daughter named Dorothy. He later entered into a de facto relationship with a Flora Jane Cameron in Brisbane which resulted in another daughter Jean and one son, George 1922. He died in Brisbane in January 1957 and was cremated at the Mount Thompson Crematorium.

== Political career ==
At the 1932 state election, Taylor defeated the sitting CPNP member, Jim Kerr for the seat of Enoggera. His extreme left wing beliefs though were a concern to the executive of the party, his presidency of the Australian-Russian Medical Aid to Soviet Russia Association in Queensland being particular concern.

On the 29 October 1941, Taylor, along with the Bulimba member, George Marriott, were expelled from the party for their actions and for the rest of their terms, both members became Independent Labor members. Taylor referred to the decision as "stupid", claiming the association "was nothing more than a humanitarian body, striving to bring medical aid to a country fighting nobly against the Germans". In the 1944 state election, they stood on an Aid to Russia ticket. Marriott managed to hold his seat but Taylor was defeated by the future Deputy Premier and QPP candidate, Kenneth Morris.

Parliament of Queensland
Preceded by James Kerr	Member for Enoggera; 1932–1944	Succeeded by Kenneth Morris
