= Herbert Yeates =

Australian politician (1879–1945)

Member of the Queensland Legislative Assembly for East Toowoomba
- In office 2 April 1938 – 24 December 1945
- Preceded by: James Kane
- Succeeded by: Les Wood

Personal details
- Born: 31 January 1879 Bowen, Queensland, Australia
- Died: 24 December 1945 (aged 66) Brisbane, Queensland, Australia
- Resting place: Drayton and Toowoomba Cemetery
- Party: Country Party
- Spouse: Margaret Tolmie
- Relations: Albert Yeates (brother); James Tolmie (brother-in-law)
- Occupation: Managing Director

Herbert Yeates (31 January 1879 – 24 December 1945) was an Australian politician. He was the Country Party member for East Toowoomba in the Legislative Assembly of Queensland from 1938 to 1945.

== History ==
Herbert Yeates was born at Bowen on 31 January 1879. In December 1880, his father, Sidney Yeates, who was then farming at Bowen, decided to migrate into the interior and travelled overland to Adavale via Withersfield (40 km west of Emerald) and Tambo, and in partnership with his brother-in law, James Francis Cudmore (1838–1912), purchased Boondoon Station from the Conn Brothers around January 1881, where they ran 50,000 sheep and 2000 cattle. Herbert Yeates gained practical experience on Boondoon until 1896, when he selected land on the Ward River near Charleville, and in company with his brothers, was engaged in sheep farming until 1900, when he sold his share and with his brothers Alfred Milo Yeates (1872–1919) and Kenneth Barr Yeates (1876–1939), established the firm of Yeates Brothers, Limited, stock and station agents, Toowoomba, Bell and elsewhere.

Like his father, Herbert Yeates took an active part in the public affairs of the community both civic and political. In 1913, he contested, unsuccessfully, the federal Division of Maranoa and again in 1917 against the Hon. James Page, who had held the seat since Federation (without much assistance, as the Country Party considered it a "forlorn hope"), but with sufficient electoral success to show that with some organisation, the Socialists could be beaten. In 1921, on the death of Page, there was a multiplicity of candidates, and Yeates unselfishly withdrew his nomination in favour of James Hunter in order to assist the Country Party. On the death of Senator John Adamson in June 1922, friends and supporters, who had been disappointed at his withdrawal, lobbied for him to accept nomination for the Senate, though being a casual vacancy, the nomination was in the gift of the ruling (Labor) State government. Controversially, a Labor politician, (John MacDonald) was chosen as the replacement for a Nationalist member, though Adamson was Labor prior to being elected.

== Family ==
Herbert Yeates had seven brothers, amongst them the pastoralist and businessman Albert Yeates (1860–1941). as well as Alfred Milo and Kenneth Barr mentioned above.

Herbert married Margaret Ann McNeil Tolmie (20 September 1878 – 1 June 1973) on 11 April 1906. They had six sons: Derick McRae Yeates FRCS, Herbert Nelson McRae Yeates, James McRae Yeates FRCS (in whose memory the Sydney University James McRae Yeates prize for clinical surgery was named), cricketer (Sidney) Fergus Macrae Yeates, Professor Neil Tolmie McRae Yeates, and Alastair Colin McRae Yeates. Margaret was a sister of James Tolmie MLA.

He was a cousin of James Kenneth Cudmore (1867–1948), of Tara and Etton stations, Barcaldine.

Yeates died on 24 December 1945, aged 66, and was buried in Drayton and Toowoomba Cemetery.

Parliament of Queensland
Preceded by James Kane	Member for East Toowoomba; 1938–1945	Succeeded by Les Wood
