= Protestant Independent Labour Party =

Former political party in Australia

Protestant Independent Labour
- Abbreviation: PLIP; PLP
- President: Walter Skelton
- Founder: Walter Skelton
- Founded: 3 July 1923; 101 years ago
- Split from: Labor
- Ideology: Social democracy; Monarchism
- Political position: Centre-left
- Religion: Protestantism
- NSW Legislative Assembly: 1 / 90 (1925–1927)
- SA House of Assembly: 1 / 46 (1927–1930)
- QLD Legislative Assembly: 1 / 62 (1938–1941)

The Protestant Independent Labour Party, alternatively spelt Protestant Independent Labor and sometimes known as the Protestant Labour Party, was a minor Australian political party that operated mainly in New South Wales, Queensland and South Australia in the 1920s and 1930s. It was formed by Walter Skelton in July 1923 as the Protestant Independent Labour Party. who had stood for the New South Wales Legislative Assembly district of Newcastle at the 1922 election, campaigning as a Protestant Independent Labour candidate, in which he was elected first of five members, receiving 25.19% of the vote. In 1925 he was re-elected to the Assembly under the Protestant Labour label, as the second of five members, receiving 17.70% of the vote. The party stood candidates in 12 of the 24 districts however Skelton was the only one elected, with the next highest candidate receiving 5.10% of the district vote.

In 1924, Walter Skelton was elected President of the New South Wales division of the party, in Hamilton, New South Wales, which was the main faction of the party.

When single-member constituencies were re-introduced in 1927 Skelton stood for the seat of Wallsend but was defeated by the Labor candidate, receiving 42.19% of the vote. Skelton stood again for the 1928 Hamilton by-election but was again defeated by the Labor candidate, receiving 48.78% of the vote after the distribution of preferences.

At the 1927 South Australian election, Thomas Thompson was elected under the Protestant Labor Party banner to the two-member seat of Port Adelaide, increasing his margin in a by-election following a challenge to his election. In 1930 he stood for the Legislative Council but was unsuccessful, as were the two Protestant Labor candidates for his former seat of Port Adelaide.

In 1938 the party elected George Morris to the Legislative Assembly of Queensland as the member for Kelvin Grove, but the party was soon moribund and he sat out his term as an independent. The party was formed in an attempt to counter the perceived Roman Catholic dominance within the ALP. Aside from the sectarian issue, its policies were broadly in agreement with the ALP.

== See also ==
- Members of the South Australian House of Assembly, 1927–1930
