= Harry Clayton (politician) =

Australian politician

Member of the Queensland Legislative Assembly for Wide Bay
- In office 9 October 1920 – 30 December 1946
- Preceded by: Andrew Thompson
- Succeeded by: James Heading

Personal details
- Born: Ernest Henry Collet Clayton; 9 November 1889 Tinana, Queensland, Australia
- Died: 30 December 1946 (aged 57) Maryborough, Queensland, Australia
- Resting place: Maryborough Cemetery
- Party: Country Party
- Spouse(s): Emily Cheyne (m.1915 d.1927), Gladys Cheyne (m.1928 d.1975)
- Occupation: Farmer

Ernest Henry Collet Clayton (9 November 1889 – 30 December 1946) was a member of the Queensland Legislative Assembly.

== Biography ==
Clayton was born in Tinana, Queensland, the son of the Rev. John Edward Clayton and his wife Frances Elizabeth (née Mills). He attended Maryborough Grammar School and upon leaving became a dairy farmer and grew sugarcane.

On 17 March 1915, Booker married Emily Cheyne and together had a son and a daughter. Emily died in 1927 and the next year he married her sister, Gladys Cheyne (died 1975). He died in December 1946 after a long illness and was buried in the Maryborough Cemetery the same day.

== Public life ==
Clayton started his career in politics by being a councillor on the Tinana Shire Council in 1910. He was also a member of the Burrum Shire Council and the Tiaro Shire Council in the 1910s.

He entered Queensland state politics by winning the seat of Wide Bay at the 1920 state elections, defeating the sitting member, Andrew Thompson. He held the seat for the next 26 years, dying in office in December 1946.

Parliament of Queensland
Preceded by Andrew Thompson	Member for Wide Bay; 1920–1946	Succeeded by James Heading
