= Harry Massey =

Australian politician (1888–1962)

Member of the Queensland Legislative Assembly for Toowong
- In office 2 April 1938 – 15 April 1944
- Preceded by: James Maxwell
- Succeeded by: Charles Wanstall

Personal details
- Born: Harry Massey; 1888 Melbourne, Victoria, Australia
- Died: 3 June 1962 (aged 74) Toowong, Queensland, Australia
- Party: United Australia Party
- Spouse: Sophie May Coburn (m.1916 d.1975)
- Occupation: Draper

Harry Massey was a politician in Queensland, Australia. He was a member of the Queensland Legislative Assembly for Toowong.

== Early life ==
He was born in Melbourne, Victoria, on 6 June 1888. He became President of the Australian Natives' Association, Melbourne Branch at 21 years of age. He was also prominent in the YMCA, a member of the Commercial Travellers' Association, the Royal Queensland Yacht Club, the Constitutional Club and Indooroopilly Golf Club.

== Politics ==
Massey was elected as an alderman of the Brisbane City Council for the Toowong ward in 1931 and held that role until 1937.

He was elected to the Queensland Legislative Assembly on 2 April 1938 as a member of the United Australia Party. He remained an elected member until 15 April 1944. He did not receive Queensland People's Party endorsement for the 1944 state election and ran as an independent, but he was defeated.

Parliament of Queensland
Preceded by James Maxwell	Member for Toowong; 1938–1944	Succeeded by Charles Wanstall
