= Herbert Williams (politician) =

Australian politician (1890–1943)

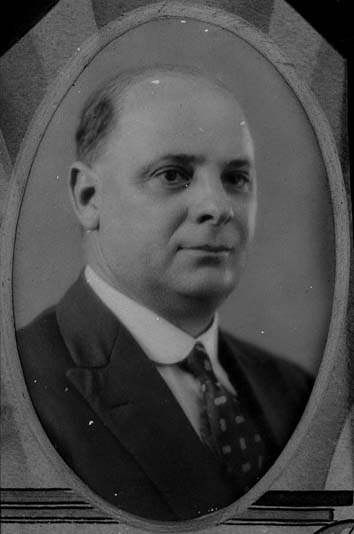
- Herbert Williams c.1934

Member of the Queensland Legislative Assembly for Windsor
- In office 11 May 1935 – 29 March 1941
- Preceded by: Charles Taylor
- Succeeded by: Harry Moorhouse

Personal details
- Born: Herbert Williams; 27 April 1890 Gympie, Queensland, Australia
- Died: 29 December 1943 (aged 53) Albion, Queensland, Australia
- Party: Labor
- Spouse: Florence Georgina Thomas (m.1912 d.1971)
- Occupation: Clerk

Herbert Williams (27 April 1890 - 29 December 1943) was a member of the Queensland Legislative Assembly.

== Biography ==
Williams was born in Gympie, Queensland, the son of the William George Williams and his wife Mary Jane (née Richards). He was educated at the Gympie State School and after he finished his schooling be was a clerk in Gympie, Bundaberg, and at the Lands Office in Brisbane.

On 20 March 1912, he married Florence Georgina Thomas (died 1971) in Ballarat and together had a son and two daughters. He died in Albion in December 1943 and was cremated at the Mt Thompson Crematorium.

== Public life ==
Williams started his career in politics as an alderman on the Brisbane City Council, serving in 1934 to 1935 during which he was on the water supply and sewerage committee.

He entered Queensland state politics as a member of the Labor Party and winning the seat of Windsor at the 1935 state election. He held the seat until 1941 when he was defeated by Harry Moorhouse, an independent democrat. When he was overlooked for pre-selection for the 1944 election, Williams challenged the decision but he died before the result.

Preceded by Charles Taylor	Member for Windsor; 1935–1941	Succeeded by Harry Moorhouse
