= Electoral district of East Toowoomba =

Coordinates: 27°34′12.82″S 151°58′21.27″E

East Toowoomba Queensland—Legislative Assembly
- State: Queensland
- Created: 1912
- Abolished: 1950

Electoral District of East Toowoomba was an electoral district of the Legislative Assembly in the Australian state of Queensland. It was created in 1912 when the old seat of Drayton & Toowoomba split into East Toowoomba, Toowoomba and Drayton. East Toowoomba ceased to exist in 1950.

In the 1960 redistribution, a seat of Toowoomba East (along with Toowoomba West) was created that lasted until 1972.

When East Toowoomba was lost to redistribution, Sir Gordon Chalk contested the seat of Lockyer successfully.

== Members for East Toowoomba ==
| Member | Party | Term |
|---|---|---|
| Thomas Roberts | Liberal; Opposition | 1912–1934 |
| James Annand | Country | 1934–1935 |
| James Kane | Labor | 1935–1938 |
| Herbert Yeates | Country | 1938–1945 |
| Les Wood | Labor | 1946–1947 |
| Gordon Chalk | Liberal | 1947–1950 |

== See also ==
- Electoral districts of Queensland
- Members of the Queensland Legislative Assembly by year
- Category:Members of the Queensland Legislative Assembly by name
