= United Australia Party – Queensland =

United Australia Party
- Leader: Hugh Russell (1936–1941)
- Founded: 1936; 90 years ago
- Dissolved: 1944; 82 years ago
- Succeeded by: Queensland People's Party
- Ideology: Liberalism (Australian); Fiscal conservatism Economic nationalism
- Political position: Centre-right

The United Australia Party was the short-lived Queensland branch of the national United Australia Party in the 1930s and 1940s. Based around Brisbane, it spent the entirety of its history in opposition, merging in 1941 into the Country-National Organisation. When that party separated in 1944, the remnants of the UAP joined the Queensland People's Party which in 1949 became the Liberal Party of Australia (Queensland Division)

== History ==
Although the federal UAP was formed in 1931 amidst a reorganisation of the right of politics, at the state level the main conservative party remained the Country and Progressive National Party which combined urban and rural forces. In 1936 the CPNP separated out, with the Brisbane section became the Queensland branch of the national UAP whilst the rural section reconstituted as the Country Party. The UAP was led by Hugh Russell, the member for Hamilton, who had been the last deputy leader of the CPNP. However the party had little electoral success, winning only four seats in both the 1938 and 1941 state elections. Russell himself was defeated in the 1941 election and this proved a fatal blow for the party. Immediately after the election the new federal leader of the Country Party Arthur Fadden, MP for the Queensland Division of Darling Downs, sought to merge the Country and United Australia parties into a single force. Only in Queensland did this yield much success with the two parliamentary parties forming the Country-National Organisation. The merger was not popular with all elements of the parties, with former federal Country MP James Hunter working hard for demerger, an aim achieved by 1944. A separate UAP reappeared but this was soon absorbed into the new Queensland People's Party set up by the Lord Mayor of Brisbane John Beals Chandler. In 1949 the party became the Queensland division of the Liberal Party.

== Election results ==
Election	Leader	Votes	%	Seats	+/–	Position	Government
1938	Hugh Russell	74,328	13.97	4 / 62	▲4	3rd	Opposition
1941	Hugh Russell	81,109	15.61	4 / 62	0	3rd	Opposition

== See also ==
- Category:United Australia Party members of the Parliament of Queensland

== Bibliography ==
- Fitzgerald, Ross (1984). From 1915 to the Early 1980s: A History of Queensland. University of Queensland Press. ISBN 9780702217340.
- Hughes, Colin A. (1980). The Government of Queensland. University of Queensland Press. ISBN 978-0702215155.
