= Electoral district of Kelvin Grove =

State electoral district of Queensland, Australia

Kelvin Grove Queensland—Legislative Assembly
- State: Queensland
- Created: 1923
- Abolished: 1960
- Namesake: Kelvin Grove, Queensland
- Demographic: Rural
- Coordinates: 27°27′S 153°01′E

The electoral district of Kelvin Grove was a Legislative Assembly electorate in the state of Queensland. It was first created in a redistribution ahead of the 1923 state election, and existed until the 1960 state election.

Kelvin Grove replaced part of the former Electoral district of Enoggera.

Kelvin Grove was abolished in 1960, replaced mainly by the Electoral district of Ashgrove.

== Members for Kelvin Grove ==
Member	Party	Term
William Lloyd	Labor	May 1923 – May 1929
Richard Hill	CPNP	May 1929 – Jun 1932
Frank Waters	Labor	Jun 1932 – Apr 1938
George Morris	Protestant Labor	Apr 1938 – Mar 1941
Bert Turner	Labor	Mar 1941 – Aug 1957
Douglas Tooth	Liberal	Aug 1957 – May 1960

Tooth went on to represent Ashgrove from May 1960 to December 1974.

== See also ==
- Electoral districts of Queensland
- Members of the Queensland Legislative Assembly by year
- Category:Members of the Queensland Legislative Assembly by name
