= Henry Littleton Groom =

Henry Groom
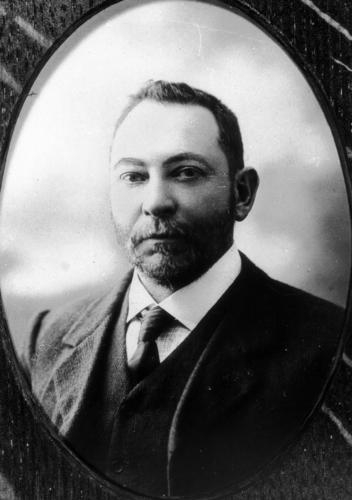

Member of the Queensland Legislative Council
- In office 12 July 1906 – 23 March 1922

Personal details
- Born: Henry Littleton Groom; 4 January 1860 Toowoomba, Queensland, Australia
- Died: 4 January 1926 (aged 66) Toowoomba, Queensland, Australia
- Resting place: Drayton and Toowoomba Cemetery
- Spouse: Marion Flora Black (m.1898 d.1933)
- Relations: William Henry Groom (father), Littleton Ernest Groom (brother)
- Occupation: Journalist

Henry Littleton Groom (4 January 1860 – 4 January 1926) was a journalist, company director, and member of the Queensland Legislative Council.

== Early life and business career ==
Groom was born at Toowoomba, Colony of Queensland, in 1860 to William Henry Groom and his wife Grace (née Littleton). His father, an auctioneer, went on to be a member of both the Queensland Parliament and, being the only transported convict ever to do so, Australian Parliament.

After his education at St Mary's School, Ipswich, and Brisbane Grammar School, he commenced work at his father's newspaper, The Toowoomba Chronicle and before long he was promoted to business manager. As his father's political interests gained momentum, Henry became the backbone of The Chronicle and in 1900 the business went from being a sole proprietorship to W. H. Groom & Sons with Henry now a director.

When his father died in August 1901, Henry became managing director and remained in that position until the Grooms sold their interest in the business to the Dunn family in 1922.

== Political career ==
In 1904, Groom unsuccessfully contested the seat of Drayton and Toowoomba in the Queensland Legislative Assembly following the death of John Fogarty. In July 1906 however, he was appointed by William Kidston to the Queensland Legislative Council and remained there until the council was abolished in 1922.

His time in the council was unremarkable and, except for one major speech on closer settlement, he rarely spoke. As a politician he was inferior to his younger brother, Littleton Groom, a future Speaker of the Federal Parliament and member for the federal seat of Darling Downs.

== Personal life ==
In 1898, Groom married Marion Flora Black at Toowoomba and together they had four children. In his younger years Groom had been a member of the Queensland Defence Force, rising to the rank of Lieutenant. As a member of the Toowoomba contingent, he was sent to Charleville during the shearers' strike of 1891.

Groom died in January 1926. After a short service at St James Church, his funeral proceeded to the Drayton and Toowoomba Cemetery for burial.

== See also ==
- Political families of Australia
