= Vernon Redwood =

Australian politician

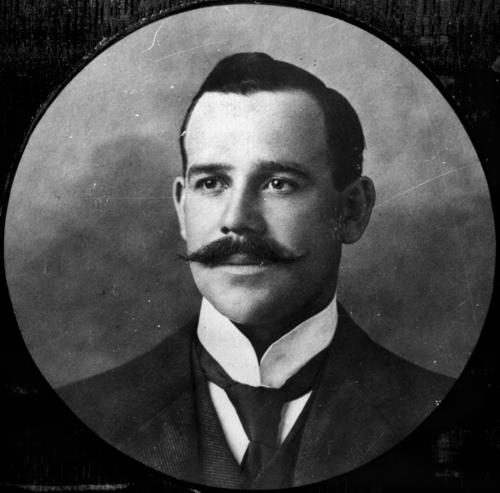

Member of the Queensland Legislative Assembly for Drayton and Toowoomba
- In office 18 May 1907 – 2 October 1909 Serving with Thomas Roberts
- Preceded by: James Tolmie
- Succeeded by: James Tolmie

Personal details
- Born: Vernon Charles Redwood; 14 April 1873 Blenheim, Marlborough, New Zealand
- Died: 15 February 1954 (aged 80) London, England
- Party: Ministerial
- Relations: Henry Redwood (uncle); Francis Redwood (uncle)
- Occupation: Maltster

Vernon Charles Redwood (14 April 1873 – 15 February 1954) was a maltster and member of the Queensland Legislative Assembly.

== Biography ==
Redwood was born at Riverlands near Blenheim, Marlborough, New Zealand, one of 15 siblings to parents Charles Redwood (1836–1915) and his wife Mary Elizabeth (née Grimstone, 1843–1912). Henry Redwood (1823–1907) and Francis Redwood (1839–1935) were his uncles. The Redwood family members were all staunch Catholics and his uncle Francis was the first Archbishop of Wellington.

Vernon Redwood was educated by the Christian Brothers in New Zealand before coming to Australia in 1893 where he found work on Westbrook Station where one of his duties was the cutting of prickly pear.

In 1895 he became a maltster at the Perkins & Co brewery in Toowoomba and many of his brothers joined him as maltsters. In 1897, his parents also emigrated to Queensland, with his father joining his sons in the malting business. In the end, only four of his siblings remained in New Zealand. In 1902, he established his own maltings business. In 1904 the business was sold to William Jones & Son, and he was its general manager until 1913. In 1913 he established the Redwood Toowoomba Grain Exchange but the business quickly failed and was liquidated later the same year.

After being awarded £500 in a libel action against the Darling Downs Gazette, he moved to Europe and settled in London where he became a member of an anti-prohibitionist group, the Fellowship of Freedom and Reform. In 1896 he married Mary Werkin Wakefield and together had 3 sons and four daughters. He died in London in 1954.

== Political career ==
Redwood was a member of the Gowrie Shire Council and for some time was an Alderman on the Toowoomba City Council including its mayor in 1910.

At the 1904 Queensland state elections he stood for the two-member seat of Drayton and Toowoomba but was beaten by fellow Ministerialists James Tolmie and John Fogarty. When Fogarty died later that same year Redwood stood at the by-election but was once again beaten, this time by the Labour candidate, Edward Smart.

He finally won the seat at the 1907 state election but held it for only two years before his defeat in 1909.

Parliament of Queensland
Preceded by James Tolmie	Member for Drayton and Toowoomba; 1907–1909; Served alongside: Thomas Roberts	Succeeded by James Tolmie
