= Millbrook, Toowoomba =

Millbrook
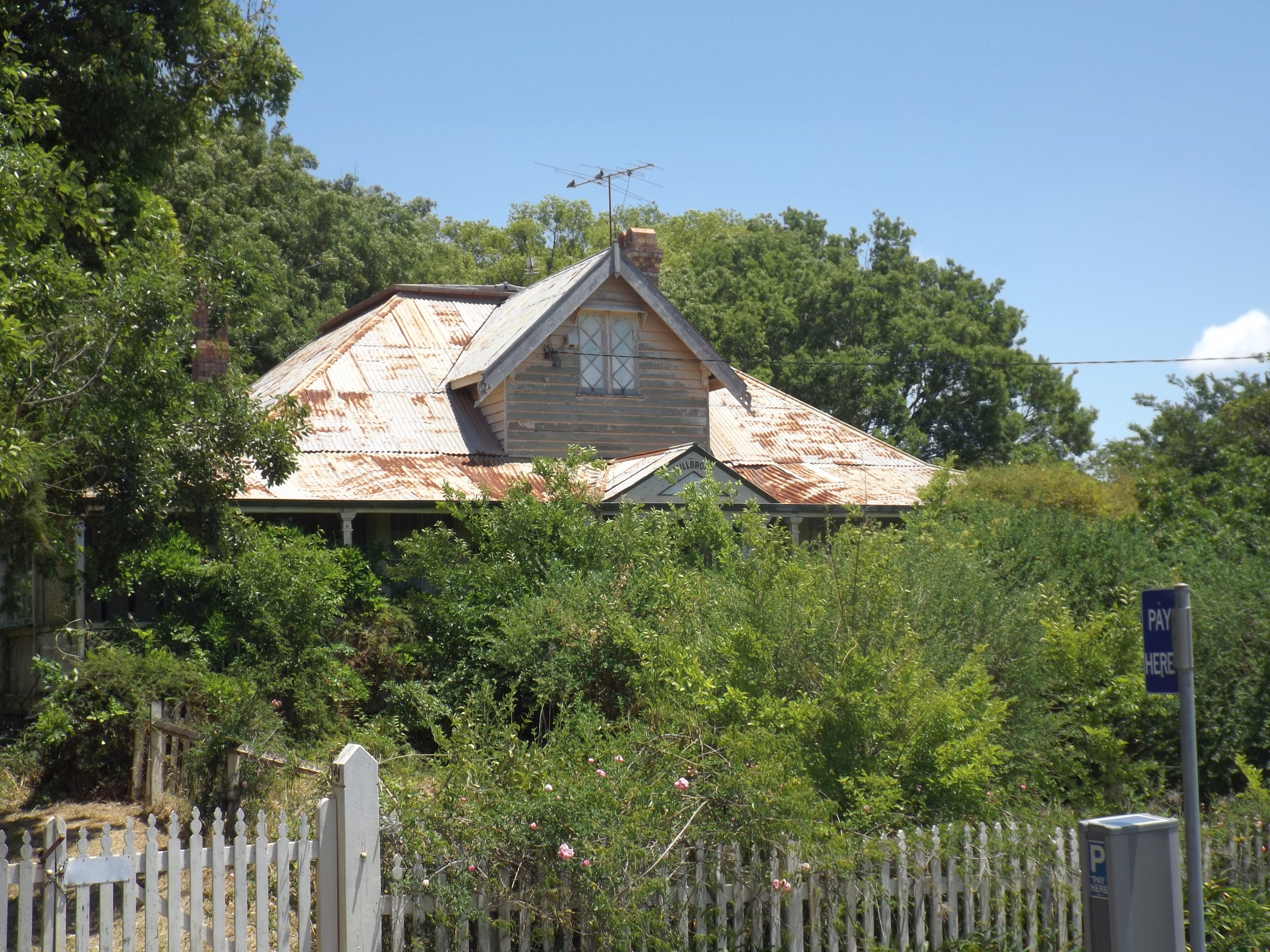
- Millbrook residence, 2014

- Location within Queensland Location within Australia
- 27.5643°S 151.959°E
- Location: 9 Phillip Street, East Toowoomba, Toowoomba, Toowoomba Region, Queensland, Australia

History
- Design period: 1840s–1860s (mid-19th century)
- Built: 1860s–1900s

Queensland Heritage Register
- Official name: Millbrook
- Type: state heritage (built, landscape)
- Designated: 27 April 2001
- Reference no.: 601310
- Significant period: 1860s, 1900s (fabric); 1860s–1970s (historical)
- Significant components: trees/plantings, laundry / wash house, service wing, fernery, stables, residential accommodation – main house, garden/grounds, bird bath

Millbrook is a heritage-listed detached house at 9 Phillip Street, East Toowoomba, Toowoomba, Toowoomba Region, Queensland, Australia. It was built from 1860s to 1900s. It was added to the Queensland Heritage Register on 27 April 2001.

== History ==
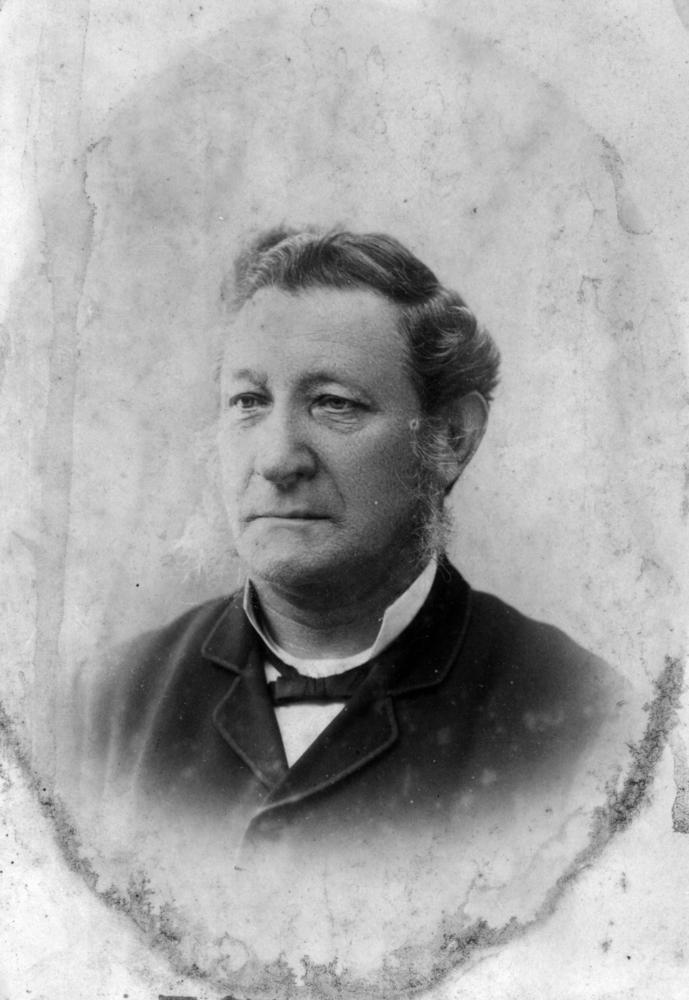
William Henry Groom, 1889

Millbrook is a large timber dwelling capped with a high pitched, hipped galvanised-iron clad roof. It has a U-shaped verandah, broken at the front by a gable pediment over the entrance lobby and a gabled attic room facing the road. The house was probably built on Ruthven Street in the 1860s as the family home of William Henry Groom. Following his death his widow moved it, in 1902, to Phillip Street.

Convicted of stealing, thirteen-year-old William Henry Groom was transported to New South Wales in 1849. In 1854 and 1855 he was charged with gold stealing, the first time he was acquitted but the second time he was imprisoned. Released in 1856 he moved to Drayton, becoming an auctioneer and storekeeper. Marriage in 1859 seemed to stabilise him as he was a prime mover for the establishment of Toowoomba as a municipality and elected the first Toowoomba mayor after municipal status (the Borough of Toowoomba) was granted 24 November 1860. WH Groom was Mayor of Toowoomba, and his wife the Lady Mayoress, seven times, in 1861, 1862, 1863, 1864, 1867, 1883 and 1884. Groom became the first Toowoomba member of the Queensland Legislative Assembly in 1862. As the local member he ensured that Queensland Government revenue assisted Toowoomba's physical and civic development and his consistent urging of agrarian land reforms were of immense benefit to small farmers throughout Queensland as well as the Darling Downs. He held his seat for 38 years, before standing and being elected as the district's first Member of the Australian House of Representatives for Darling Downs. Groom was also a successful local business figure who was involved with the foundation of the Toowoomba Grammar School, Toowoomba School of Arts and Toowoomba Permanent Building Society. He was engaged in the Toowoomba Chronicle by 1874 and the sole owner from 1876. In 1900 he restructured the ownership to include his sons, with his eldest son Henry Littleton Groom becoming the managing director following WH Groom's death on 8 August 1901.

Mr and Mrs Groom lived in Drayton after their marriage in 1859. It is believed that they established their family home on Ruthven Street near the end of the Toowoomba railway station in the mid-1860s; an 1874 photograph shows this large house with a well-established garden and Mrs Grace Groom (née Littleton) holding a very young daughter.

On 8 August 1901, MHR WH Groom aged 67 died in Melbourne while attending the first sitting of Australian Parliament. By February 1902, his widow, Mrs Grace Groom, had purchased from John Munro 2 roods 16 perches (2,400 m^{2}) in Phillip Street, and had moved most of the Ruthven Street house to this site by June 1902. A reason given for this move was that she found Ruthven Street to have become too busy.

Due to the sloping terrain the house was set on higher stumps and new front stairs were constructed. It is thought that cast-iron balustrading replaced the original lattice verandah balustrading at this time. It appears that one wing of the house was not moved from Ruthven Street, as most of Mrs Groom's 8 children had married and established their own homes. Her youngest son, Leslie Walter, was still living at home and was married from Millbrook in 1904. LW Groom was a solicitor with Eden and Groom which became Groom and Lavers.

Widowed daughter Margaret (Maggie) Amelia Baynes, her daughter, Ellen (Nellie) and son, Mervyn lived with Mrs WH Groom in this old family home for many years and Leslie Walter Groom's daughter Noela Brooks boarded at Millbrook for most of her school years. When Mrs Grace Groom died in 1932 her daughter, Mrs WT Baynes, was still living at Millbrook.

Two Groom sons went into politics. Sir Littleton Ernest Groom succeeded his father as the Darling Downs member of the Australian House of Representatives and Henry Littleton Groom was a member of the Queensland Legislative Council from 12 July 1906 to 23 March 1922. As a parliamentarian's wife Mrs Groom had opened and laid the foundation stone for many of Toowoomba's public buildings, and as the mother of politicians she continued to play a role in politics. Mrs Groom was well known for her garden parties at Millbrook, and as a well-known figure she continued to present school prizes and open events until her final years.

Granddaughter Noela Brooks described the house and garden from memory in 1981. Mrs Groom not only grew prize-winning flowers but as was typical of the day her garden included useful kitchen plantings such as peach, apple, apricot trees, herbs and vegetables. The garden naturally included a chicken run, well and stables.

Mrs Brooks remembered various aspects of her life with her grandmother such as the glassed in northern side verandah used for morning tea and entertaining close friends. Family afternoon tea was served in the dining room (now lounge room), except when the drawing room (front north eastern room) was used for important visitors. Fireplaces in the dining and drawing rooms shared a chimney, and beside the dining room fireplace was a tassel for calling the maid. The drawing room and Mrs Groom's room were carpeted, but all other rooms had highly polished linoleum.

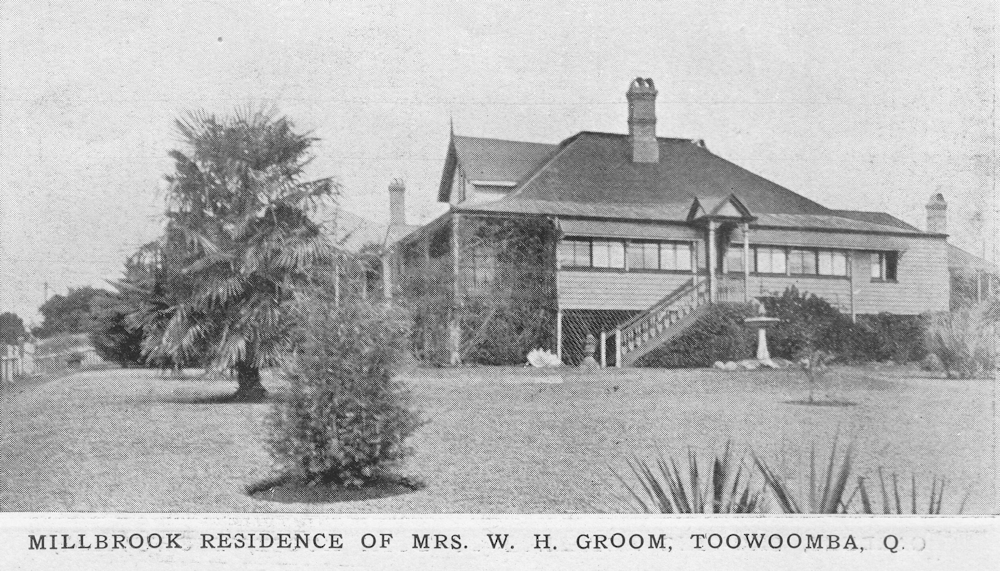
Millbrook residence of Mrs W. H. Groom, circa 1915

After Mrs Groom's death in 1932, Millbrook was vacant only a short time before it was rented by Dr Row and his mother in 1933. Allan Warren Row, the 1914 Queensland Rhodes Scholar, completed a year of medicine at Oxford University before serving as a lieutenant with the British Army in World War I. After completing his studies he returned to Queensland in 1930 and joined a local practice for a few years before establishing his own surgery. Although he was a visiting surgeon to Toowoomba Hospital, like most doctors he established a surgery in his own house (Millbrook). Dr Row used what had been the formal sitting room for his private medical practice. The closed-in northern verandah known as the glass room was partitioned and used as the surgery entrance and waiting room. He converted what had been Mrs Groom's ensuite into a workshop.

During World War II Dr Row served in the Australian Army Medical Corps. He was severely wounded at Tobruk and following his recovery in Toowoomba Lieutenant-Colonel Row was in charge of surgery at various Australian hospitals. In 1946–1947 he was in charge of the Greenslopes army hospital. He returned to Toowoomba in 1947, and with Dr Woodhill and Dr Trennery set up the first blood bank transfusion service in Toowoomba. Not only did Row have his private practice but also over the years he was a senior surgeon at Toowoomba General Hospital and visiting surgeon at Baillie Henderson Hospital and Westbrook Farm for Boys and Army Medical Officer for Cabarlah Signal Operations. He continued using Millbrook for his private practice until 1976.

In 1948 Dr Allan Row married Glennie schoolteacher Dorothy Lake and in 1955 the kitchen was modernised to her specifications. This included removal of an early stove, refrigerator and dresser and installation of a long workbench with built in cupboards that created two distinct areas; a kitchen and eating area. After Mrs Dorothy Row had a serious accident in the outside laundry, modern facilities were installed on the enclosed verandah in a corner near the bathroom and kitchen in 1956.

Eighty-four years old, Dr Row died on 20 June 1979. During the 1980s Mrs Row started refurbishing the house. This included changing green kalsomine-painted walls to oil-based pale coloured paints, and covering linoleum and timber floors with tiles and carpets. Front steps were replaced and the northern porch rebuilt due to aging. A small fish and frog pool in the back garden was created in what had been Mrs Groom's orchard. In 1983 a sundeck, able to accommodate 26 people, was constructed. Removal of 700 lead head nails in the roof occurred when rebuilding the roof space because of water damage. The following year the front fence was rebuilt using many of the original palings and an octagonal gazebo able to seat 8 persons built. Other improvements included enhancing some rooms by the addition of plaster ceiling roses and converting a bedroom into a dining room.

Like Mrs Groom, Mrs Row is known for her community activities. She has been involved with SPELD (Specific Learning Difficulties), the National Trust of Queensland and the local repertory theatre.

All of the trees in Mrs Grooms back-yard orchard have died and were not replaced, but many of the early garden plantings in the front yard survive and the early 1900s stables remain. In 2014, a local women's rugby league team, the Toowoomba Fillies, assisted the 92-year-old Mrs Row by cleaning up the garden which had become very overgrown.

== Description ==
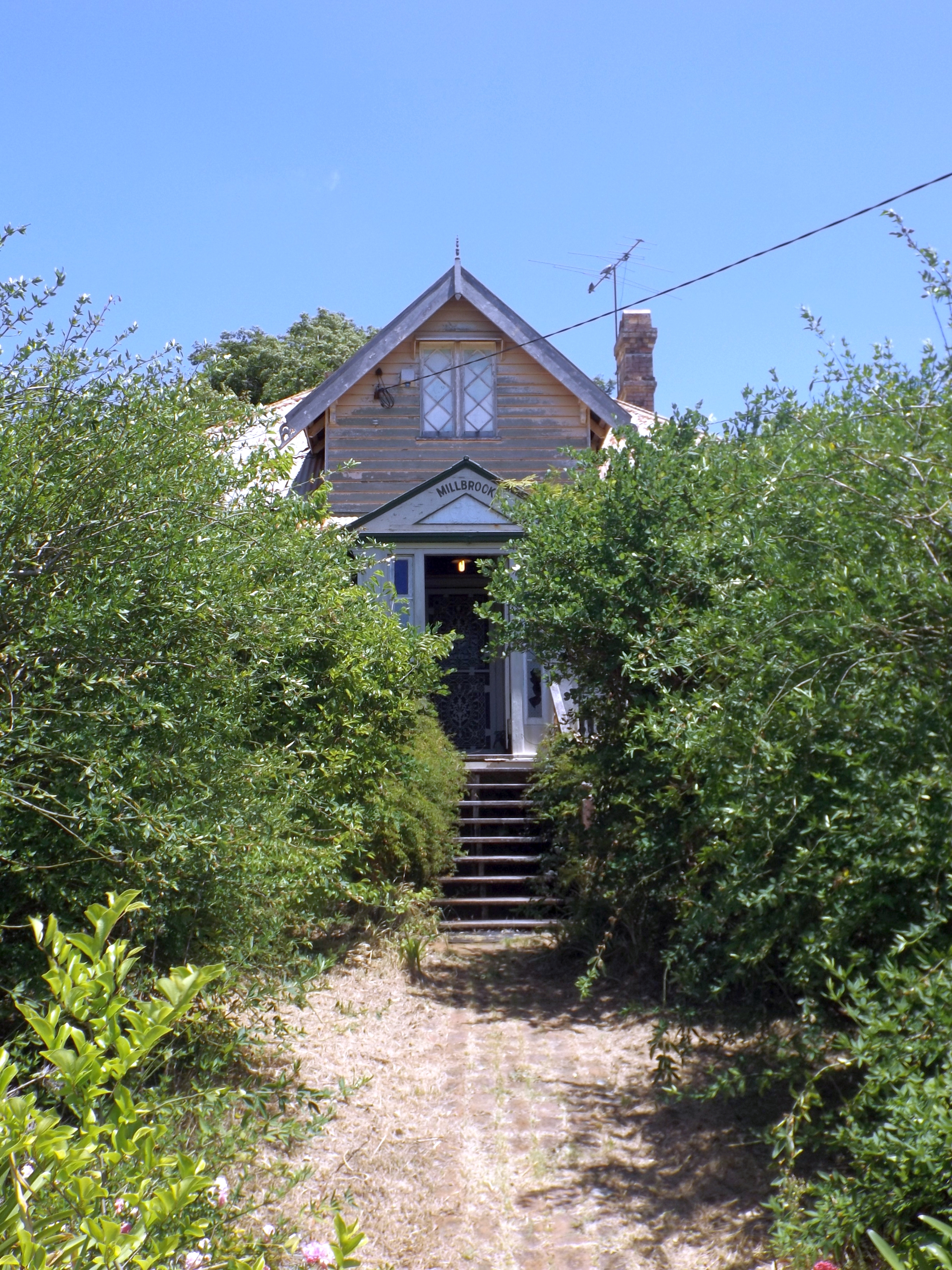
Entrance to Millbrook, 2014

Millbrook, a single-storey weatherboard residence with a bellcast corrugated iron roof, is set on a large block of land with a large garden on the northern side and long drive on the southern side. The core of the house is rectangular in plan and contains the bedrooms and formal living rooms. There is an attached service wing at the rear.

Two chimneys break the symmetry of the front elevation. The steeply pitched corrugated iron roof rises to a ridge, and on the front elevation is a projecting gabled mock attic with fretwork bargeboards and finial. Its small casement windows have been painted. A central gable pediment roofs the entrance lobby; on either side are two open verandahs.

Extending onto both front verandahs is a bay window. Verandah balustrading is cast-iron, and poles with astragals support the brokenback verandah roof. Short balustraded steps lead to the central front door which has glass sidelights. Another front door gives access to the central hallway which has two rooms on either side. The two front bay window rooms are smaller than the other two rooms.

Internally all walls are lined with narrow VJs and ceilings are wide VJs with central double-beading. Doors opening onto the central hall are cedar surmounted by fanlights. Fireplaces have cedar surrounds with iron grates.

The front room on the left is a bedroom with a door opening onto an enclosed verandah which is used as a storeroom. The larger room on the left has a bay window to an open side verandah and a door to a small room that could be a bathroom or workroom. This large room shares a back to back fireplace with a museum type dining room.

The two rooms on the right have cedar fireplaces and are the former doctors surgery and a lounge room. Both open onto an enclosed verandah known as the glass verandah; a partition with a door separates these two rooms. A door gives access to the side porch and steps to the garden. The verandah off the lounge has been partitioned to create two rooms, the glass room and a small bedroom. At the western end of the lounge is a bay window with a door that provides access to another verandah and service wing.

The rear of the house contains a wide room set up to include a dining room, pantry and kitchen on the southern side of the back closed-in verandah. Beside the kitchen and at the end of the verandah is the bathroom and to the north is a large sundeck. Opening off the southern side of the kitchen is the maid's room and a door to a porch with steps that provides access to the external toilet, driveway and stable yard.

An old laundry abuts the rear of the kitchen. A semi-formal side entrance on the northern elevation links the glass room to the front side garden. This porch has a roof with a gable pediment on three sides and steps with cast iron balustrading.

Adjoining the drive on the southern elevation is a narrow garden. The drive leads to the old stables used as garage and storage rooms. This timber structure of four rooms has a gable roof with slightly pitched skillion extension and is in a poor condition. Several mature Chinese Elms planted by Mrs Row, and separated from the back garden by a recent picket fence, shelter the stable yard.

The side garden is divided into two sections. The front lawn with its early marble birdbath (reputedly brought from the Ruthven Street garden) in a small pool is secluded from the street by large mature trees. Various old trees shelter the overgrown rear garden with its gazebo. Separating the two garden areas is a former fernery or shade house and an abundance of dense growth. A hedge with a gate separates the two garden spaces.

A picket fence separates the small front garden from the driveway and footpath. A pathway from the drive and front gate leads to the front door and around to the northern porch entry.

== Heritage listing ==
Millbrook was listed on the Queensland Heritage Register on 27 April 2001 having satisfied the following criteria.

The place is important in demonstrating the evolution or pattern of Queensland's history.

Millbrook, erected c. 1860s in Ruthven Street, Toowoomba, and removed in 1902 to nearby Phillip Street, is important in illustrating the evolution of Queensland's history. It is one of Toowoomba's few extant 1860s houses, and its removal from a main commercial street to Phillip Street, in the early 1900s illustrates the growth and expansion of Toowoomba as a major regional centre in the second half of the 19th century.

The place is important in demonstrating the principal characteristics of a particular class of cultural places.

The place demonstrates the principle characteristics of a large, c. 1860s residence with 1902 renovations, including large rooms and substantial garden areas useful for entertaining, attached kitchen wing, and associated outbuildings. The place is illustrative of a way of life no longer common.

The place is important because of its aesthetic significance.

The place has strong aesthetic appeal, engendered by the intactness of the timber house and its mature garden setting, and makes a significant contribution to the Phillip Street streetscape.

The place has a strong or special association with a particular community or cultural group for social, cultural or spiritual reasons.

The place has a strong and special association with the Groom and Row families, which is valued by the community.

The place has a special association with the life or work of a particular person, group or organisation of importance in Queensland's history.

The place has a strong and special association with the Groom and Row families, which is valued by the community. Newspaper proprietor and politician William Henry Groom represented Toowoomba in the first Queensland and Commonwealth Parliaments. MLA Groom's main interests were land policy, agrarian reform and ensuring expenditure on roads and services within his electorate. Millbrook is important also for its association with Mrs WH Groom, wife and mother of politicians and active member of the community, who resided here for 30 thirty years. Dr Row was an important Toowoomba medical man who served in both World Wars. Lieutenant-Colonel Row was in charge of the Greenslopes Hospital 1946–1947. From 1948 to 1979 he conducted his private practice from Millbrook while being a surgeon at most of the local hospitals and the Toowoomba Army Area Officer.
