= Electoral results for the district of East Toowoomba =

Queensland state electoral result

This is a list of electoral results for the electoral district of East Toowoomba in Queensland state elections.

== Members for East Toowoomba ==
Member	Party	Term
Thomas Roberts	Liberal; Opposition	1912–1934
James Annand	Country	1934–1935
James Kane	Labor	1935–1938
Herbert Yeates	Country	1938–1945
Les Wood	Labor	1946–1947
Gordon Chalk	Liberal	1947–1950

== Election results ==
=== Elections in the 1940s ===
1947 Queensland state election: East Toowoomba
Party	Candidate	Votes	%	±%
People's Party	Gordon Chalk	5,015	51.8	+51.8
Labor	Les Wood	4,669	48.2	+7.0
Total formal votes		9,684	98.5	−0.2
Informal votes		145	1.5	+0.2
Turnout		9,829	87.6	+2.9
People's Party gain from Labor		Swing	N/A	

1946 East Toowoomba state by-election
Party	Candidate	Votes	%	±%
Labor	Les Wood	4,538	51.1	+9.9
Country	Thomas Thompson	4,352	48.9	−7.2
Total formal votes		8,890	98.9	+0.2
Informal votes		97	1.1	−0.2
Turnout		8,987	N/A	N/A
Labor gain from Country		Swing	N/A	

1944 Queensland state election: East Toowoomba
Party	Candidate	Votes	%	±%
Country	Herbert Yeates	4,854	56.1	+1.9
Labor	Jim Thorpe	3,560	41.2	−4.6
Independent	K N Kunkel	230	2.7	+2.7
Total formal votes		8,644	98.7	+0.6
Informal votes		115	1.3	−0.6
Turnout		8,759	84.7	−8.8
Country hold		Swing	+3.5	

1941 Queensland state election: East Toowoomba
Party	Candidate	Votes	%	±%
Country	Herbert Yeates	4,623	54.2	+23.1
Labor	James Kane	3,906	45.8	+0.4
Total formal votes		8,529	98.1	−0.5
Informal votes		167	1.9	+0.5
Turnout		8,696	93.5	+3.4
Country hold		Swing	+2.8	

=== Elections in the 1930s ===
1938 Queensland state election: East Toowoomba
Party	Candidate	Votes	%	±%
Labor	James Kane	3,831	45.4	−9.0
Country	Herbert Yeates	2,626	31.1	−14.5
Ind. United Australia	James Annand	1,986	23.5	+23.5
Total formal votes		8,443	98.6	+0.1
Informal votes		120	1.4	−0.1
Turnout		8,563	90.1	−2.4
Two-party-preferred result
Country	Herbert Yeates	4,198	51.3	+5.7
Labor	James Kane	3,977	48.7	−5.7
Country gain from Labor		Swing	+5.7	

1935 Queensland state election: East Toowoomba
Party	Candidate	Votes	%	±%
Labor	James Kane	4,400	54.4	
CPNP	James Annand	3,696	45.6	
Total formal votes		8,096	98.5	
Informal votes		123	1.5	
Turnout		8,219	92.5	
Labor gain from CPNP		Swing		

1934 East Toowoomba state by-election
Party	Candidate	Votes	%	±%
CPNP	James Annand	4,227	51.0	+1.7
Labor	James Kane	4,055	49.0	+7.8
Total formal votes		8,282		
Informal votes				
Turnout				
CPNP hold		Swing	−4.4	

1932 Queensland state election: East Toowoomba
Party	Candidate	Votes	%	±%
CPNP	Robert Roberts	4,005	49.3	
Labor	James Strohfeld	3,347	41.2	
Independent	Frank Common	773	9.5	
Total formal votes		8,125	99.0	
Informal votes		79	1.0	
Turnout		8,204	94.6	
Two-party-preferred result
CPNP	Robert Roberts	4,337	55.4	
Labor	James Strohfeld	3,485	44.6	
CPNP hold		Swing		

=== Elections in the 1920s ===
1929 Queensland state election: East Toowoomba
Party	Candidate	Votes	%	±%
CPNP	Robert Roberts	4,136	69.7	+7.9
Labor	Reginald Turnbull	1,793	30.3	−7.9
Total formal votes		5,929		
Informal votes				
Turnout				
CPNP hold		Swing	+7.9	

1926 Queensland state election: East Toowoomba
Party	Candidate	Votes	%	±%
CPNP	Robert Roberts	3,827	61.8	+0.2
Labor	John Herbert	2,369	38.2	−0.2
Total formal votes		6,196	99.2	+0.1
Informal votes		52	0.8	−0.1
Turnout		6,248	89.1	+11.2
CPNP hold		Swing	+0.2	

1923 Queensland state election: East Toowoomba
Party	Candidate	Votes	%	±%
United	Robert Roberts	3,651	61.6	−0.2
Labor	Thomas Armfield	2,275	38.4	+0.2
Total formal votes		5,926	99.1	+1.2
Informal votes		52	0.9	−1.2
Turnout		5,978	77.9	−10.6
United hold		Swing	−0.2	

1920 Queensland state election: East Toowoomba
Party	Candidate	Votes	%	±%
National	Robert Roberts	3,022	61.8	+10.4
Labor	John Mattingley	1,870	38.2	−10.4
Total formal votes		4,892	97.9	−0.7
Informal votes		104	2.1	+0.7
Turnout		4,996	88.5	+6.7
National hold		Swing	+10.4	

=== Elections in the 1910s ===
1918 Queensland state election: East Toowoomba
Party	Candidate	Votes	%	±%
National	Robert Roberts	2,511	51.4	−3.8
Labor	James MacDougall	2,370	48.6	+3.8
Total formal votes		4,881	98.6	−0.5
Informal votes		70	1.4	+0.5
Turnout		4,951	81.8	−5.2
National hold		Swing	−3.8	

1915 Queensland state election: East Toowoomba
Party	Candidate	Votes	%	±%
Liberal	Robert Roberts	2,378	55.2	−0.5
Labor	Thomas Lonsdale	1,931	44.8	+0.5
Total formal votes		4,309	99.1	−0.2
Informal votes		37	0.9	+0.2
Turnout		4,346	87.0	+12.5
Liberal hold		Swing	−0.5	

1912 Queensland state election: East Toowoomba
Party	Candidate	Votes	%	±%
Liberal	Robert Roberts	1,851	55.7	
Labor	George Walden	1,473	44.3	
Total formal votes		3,324	99.3	
Informal votes		22	0.7	
Turnout		3,346	74.5	
Liberal hold		Swing		
