= Robert Aland =

Australian politician

The Honourable Robert Aland
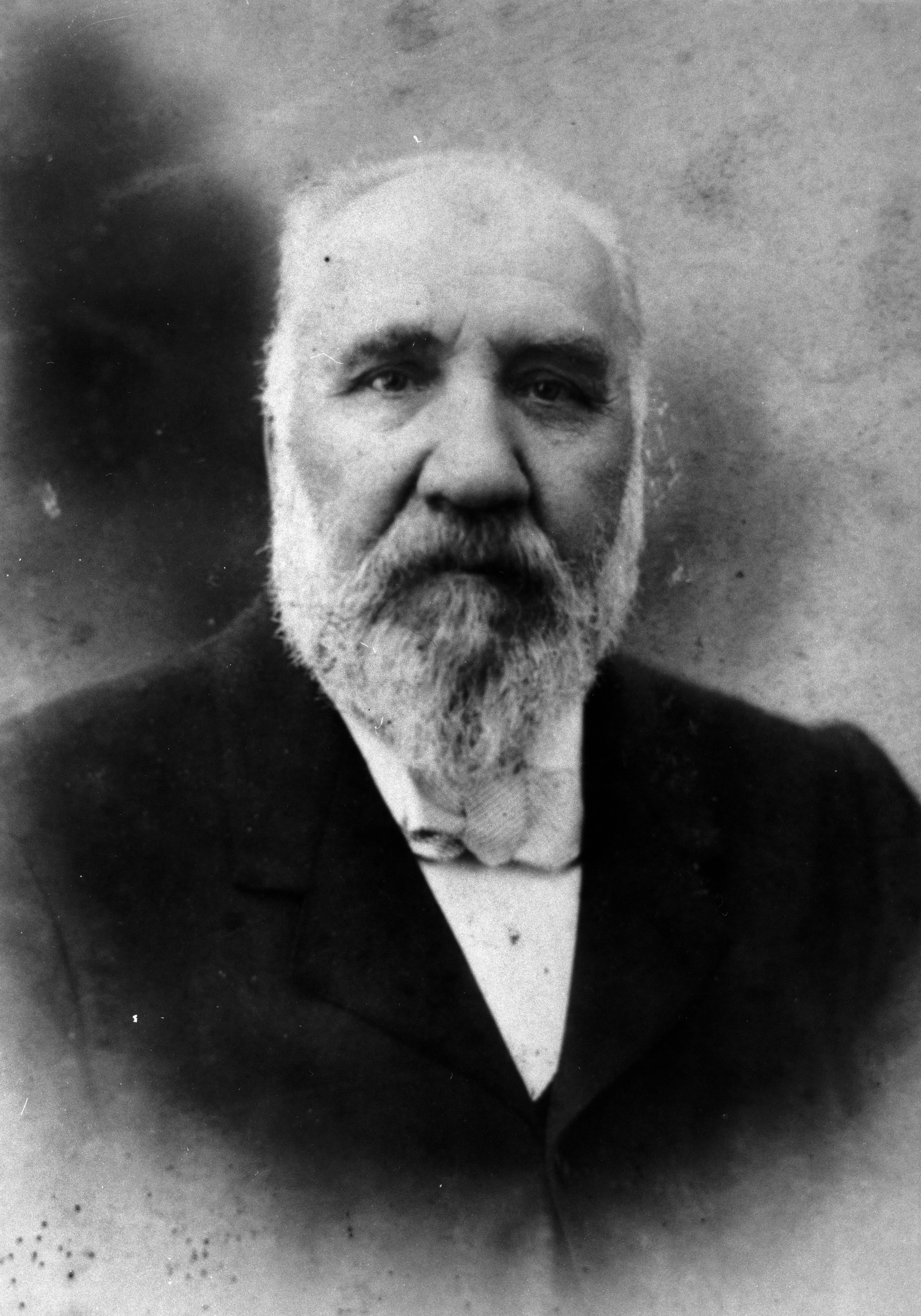
- Hon. Robert Aland, member of the Queensland Assembly

Member of the Queensland Legislative Assembly for Drayton and Toowoomba
- In office 14 January 1881 – 6 May 1893 Serving with William Henry Groom
- Preceded by: George Davenport
- Succeeded by: John Fogarty

Personal details
- Born: Robert Aland; 24 December 1836 London, England
- Died: 19 March 1904 (aged 67) Warwick, Queensland, Australia
- Resting place: Drayton and Toowoomba Cemetery
- Spouse: Margaret Clegg (m.1856 d.1915)
- Occupation: Ironmonger

Robert Aland (24 December 1836 – 19 March 1904) was a politician in Queensland, Australia. He was a member of the Queensland Legislative Assembly. He represented the electorate of Drayton and Toowoomba from 1881 to 1893.

== Life ==
Robert Aland was born on in London, England. He migrated to Brisbane, Queensland, Australia in 1855 when he was 18 years old. He worked himself up from a store clerk in Ipswich to successfully establishing an ironmongery business in Toowoomba and Warwick in 1876. His premises were in the northern site of Ruthven Street.

He had five sons and seven daughters with his wife Margaret, née Clegg. He was a member and trustee of the Methodist Church in Toowoomba and follower of John Wesley's theological system.

== Career ==
Robert Aland was an alderman of the Toowoomba City Council in 1873, 1876, 1877 and the mayor of Toowoomba from 1874 to 1875. During his term as the mayor, he made a push for permanent water supply, and the supply scheme was carried out successfully for the first time in those years. In 1878 Robert Aland was invited to stand as a candidate during the redistribution of the Legislative Assembly seat of Toowoomba and gained third place after Hon. W. H. Groom and junior member George Davenport. After Davenport died in 1881, Aland was appointed to the Assembly and held his seat for 12 years until 1893. He did not seek re-election as his views and the views of the voting public differed towards the end of his political career.

Furthermore, during his life, Aland held major shares of the Toowoomba Foundry Company and acted as the chairman of directors from 1886 to 1901. He was a committee member on the board of the Toowoomba Hospital for 30 years until his death. Aland was also on the committee of the Toowoomba Grammar School and the Drayton and Toowoomba Cemetery for many years.

== Death ==
Robert Aland was well respected in his community and with his peers. He died on 19 March 1904 in Warwick, Queensland, Australia. Hundreds of people assembled at his service led by Reverends J. G. Martin and Blamires, which included members of the council, Grammar School trustees, the Police Magistrate, the Hospital Committee, the Chamber of Commerce and leading business men and professionals of Toowoomba and area. He was interred at Drayton and Toowoomba Cemetery.

Parliament of Queensland
| Preceded by George Davenport | Member for Drayton and Toowoomba; 1881–1893; Served alongside: William Henry Groom | Succeeded by John Fogarty |
