= James Tolmie (Australian politician) =

Australian politician

The Hon James Tolmie
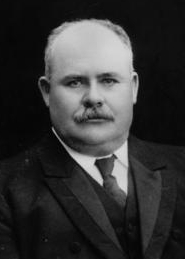

Leader of the Opposition of Queensland
- In office 8 September 1915 – 15 February 1918
- Preceded by: Edward Macartney
- Succeeded by: Edward Macartney

Member of the Queensland Legislative Assembly for Drayton and Toowoomba
- In office 15 June 1901 – 18 May 1907 Serving with John Fogarty, Edward Smart
- Preceded by: William Henry Groom
- Succeeded by: Vernon Redwood
- In office 2 October 1909 – 27 April 1912 Serving with Robert Roberts
- Preceded by: Aubrey Slessar
- Succeeded by: Seat abolished

Member of the Queensland Legislative Assembly for Toowoomba
- In office 27 April 1912 – 16 March 1918
- Preceded by: New seat
- Succeeded by: Frank Brennan

Personal details
- Born: 25 July 1862 Moreton Bay, Queensland
- Died: 6 April 1939 (aged 76) Toowoomba, Queensland
- Resting place: Drayton and Toowoomba Cemetery
- Party: National
- Other political affiliations: Ministerial, Liberal
- Relations: Herbert Yeates (brother-in-law)
- Occupation: Teacher, newspaper proprietor, soldier

James Tolmie (25 July 1862 – 6 April 1939) was a member of the Parliament of Queensland, newspaper proprietor, and soldier.

== History ==
James Tolmie was born on the ship Registan in Moreton Bay, just outside Brisbane, Queensland on 25 July 1862, to Roderick Tolmie and his wife Helen (née Macrae), who were coming from Scotland to Queensland. The eldest of a family of nine children, he was educated at the South State School, Toowoomba, and began as a pupil teacher in 1877. In 1894 he became editor, with a half-share interest, of the Darling Downs Gazette, a position he held until that paper's amalgamation with the Toowoomba Chronicle in 1922. He was a notable athlete in his younger days, being particularly proficient as footballer and cricketer.

== Political career ==
He was elected to the Queensland Parliament for the double electorate of Drayton and Toowoomba in 1901 and with the exception of a break of 12 months in 1908, represented the Toowoomba area continuously until 1918. He was Minister for Agriculture and Stock in the Denham Ministry from 1911 to 1912, and was Secretary for Public Lands from 1912 to 1915. He was re-elected in 1915, when the Denham Government was defeated, and was Leader of the Opposition until he was forced to resign in 1918 due to ill health. At the general election in 1918 he was defeated by F. T. Brennan, better known as Judge Brennan. From 1924 to 1927 he was an alderman of the City of Toowoomba.

== Other interests ==
Before the Federation of Australia in 1901, Tolmie was a captain in the Fourth Queensland Regiment, and during World War I was major in command of a troop ship. He was a loyal adherent of the Presbyterian Church and a Freemason.

== Family ==
Mr. Tolmie, who did not marry, died in 1939 and was buried in Drayton and Toowoomba Cemetery. He was survived by five sisters, one of whom married Herbert Yeates MLA. Nephews included Dr. Derick Yeates FRCS, of Brisbane, Herbert Yeates, a barrister, of Brisbane, and Fergus Yeates, former Queensland Sheffield Shield slow bowler, and lecturer at Sydney University and James McRae Yeates for whom the James McRae Yeates prize for clinical surgery was named.

== See also ==
- Members of the Queensland Legislative Assembly, 1899–1902; 1902–1904; 1904–1907; 1909–1912; 1912–1915; 1915–1918

Political offices
Preceded by Edward Macartney	Leader of the Opposition of Queensland; 1915–1918	Succeeded by Edward Macartney
Parliament of Queensland
Preceded by William Henry Groom	Member for Drayton and Toowoomba; 1901–1907; Served alongside: John Fogarty, Edward Smart	Succeeded by Vernon Redwood
Preceded by Aubrey Slessar	Member for Drayton and Toowoomba; 1909–1912; Served alongside: Robert Roberts	Abolished
New seat	Member for Toowoomba; 1912–1918	Succeeded by Frank Brennan
