= Edward Smart (politician) =

Australian politician

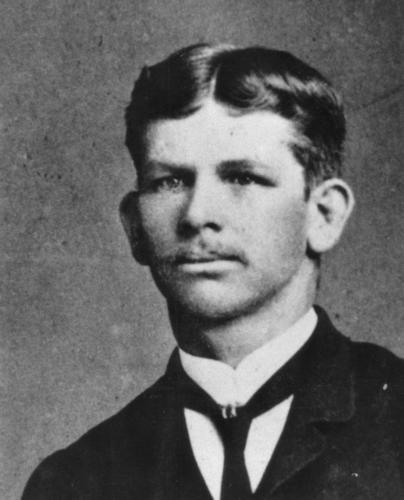

Member of the Queensland Legislative Assembly for Drayton & Toowoomba
- In office 1 October 1904 – 18 May 1907 Serving with James Tolmie
- Preceded by: John Fogarty
- Succeeded by: Thomas Roberts

Personal details
- Born: Edward Lithgow Smart; 9 December 1862 Ipswich, Queensland, Australia
- Died: 28 November 1948 (aged 85) Toowoomba, Queensland, Australia
- Resting place: Drayton and Toowoomba Cemetery
- Party: Labour Party
- Spouse: Emma Jessie Hunt (m.1895 d.1939)
- Occupation: Plumber

Edward Lithgow Smart (9 December 1862 – 28 November 1948) was a plumber and member of the Queensland Legislative Assembly.

== Biography ==
Smart was born at Ipswich, Queensland, to parents Thomas Smart and his wife Elizabeth (née Ball). He attended Toowoomba State School and became an apprentice plumber. He acquired his own plumbing business in 1885 and eventually became a director of the Sugarloaf Colliery Company.

On 11 April 1895 he married Emma Jessie Hunt (died 1939) and together had three sons and two daughters. He died in November 1948 and was buried in the Drayton and Toowoomba Cemetery.

== Political career ==
Smart, who was a member of the Independent Order of Rechabites, was an Alderman on the Toowoomba City Council from 1894 until 1900. When one of the sitting members for the Queensland state seat of Drayton & Toowoomba, John Fogarty died in 1904, Smart, representing the Labour Party, won the resulting by-election. He held the seat for three years, declining to stand at the 1907 state election.

Parliament of Queensland
Preceded by John Fogarty	Member for Drayton & Toowoomba; 1904–1907; Served alongside: James Tolmie	Succeeded by Thomas Roberts
