= Henry Llewelyn =

Australian politician (born 1855)

The Hon Henry Llewelyn
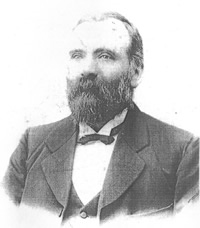

Member of the Queensland Legislative Council
- In office 10 October 1917 – 23 March 1922

Personal details
- Born: Henry Llewelyn; 12 September 1855 Merthyr Tydfil, Wales
- Died: 6 August 1933 (aged 77) Brisbane, Queensland, Australia
- Resting place: Toowong Cemetery
- Party: Labor
- Spouse(s): Eleanor Davies (d.1874 d.1891), Mary Ann McNamee (m.1895 d.1936)
- Relations: Evan Llewelyn (son)
- Occupation: Trade union representative

Henry Llewelyn (12 September 1855 – 6 August 1933) was a member the Queensland Legislative Council.

Llewelyn was born at Merthyr Tydfil, Wales, to Henry Llewelyn and his wife Elizabeth. He arrived in Australia in 1885 and headed to Gympie to work as a gold miner. In later years he opened a bookshop and stationer which he ran for 34 years.

== Political career ==
When the Labour Party starting forming governments in Queensland, it found much of its legislation being blocked by a hostile Council, where members had been appointed for life by successive conservative governments. After a failed referendum in May 1917, Premier Ryan tried a new tactic, and later that year advised the Governor, Sir Hamilton John Goold-Adams, to appoint thirteen new members whose allegiance lay with Labour to the council.

Llewelyn was one of the thirteen new members, and went on to serve for four and a half years until the council was abolished in March 1922.

== Personal life ==
Llewelyn was twice married, firstly to Eleanor Davies at Wales in 1874. Eleanor died in 1891 and he then married Mary Ann McNamee (died 1936) at Gympie in 1895. His marriages resulted in twelve children, including Evan Llewelyn who went on to be the Labor member for the state seat of Toowoomba.

He died in Brisbane in August 1933 and was buried at Toowong Cemetery.
