= William Henry Groom =

Australian politician (1833–1901)

The Honourable William Henry Groom
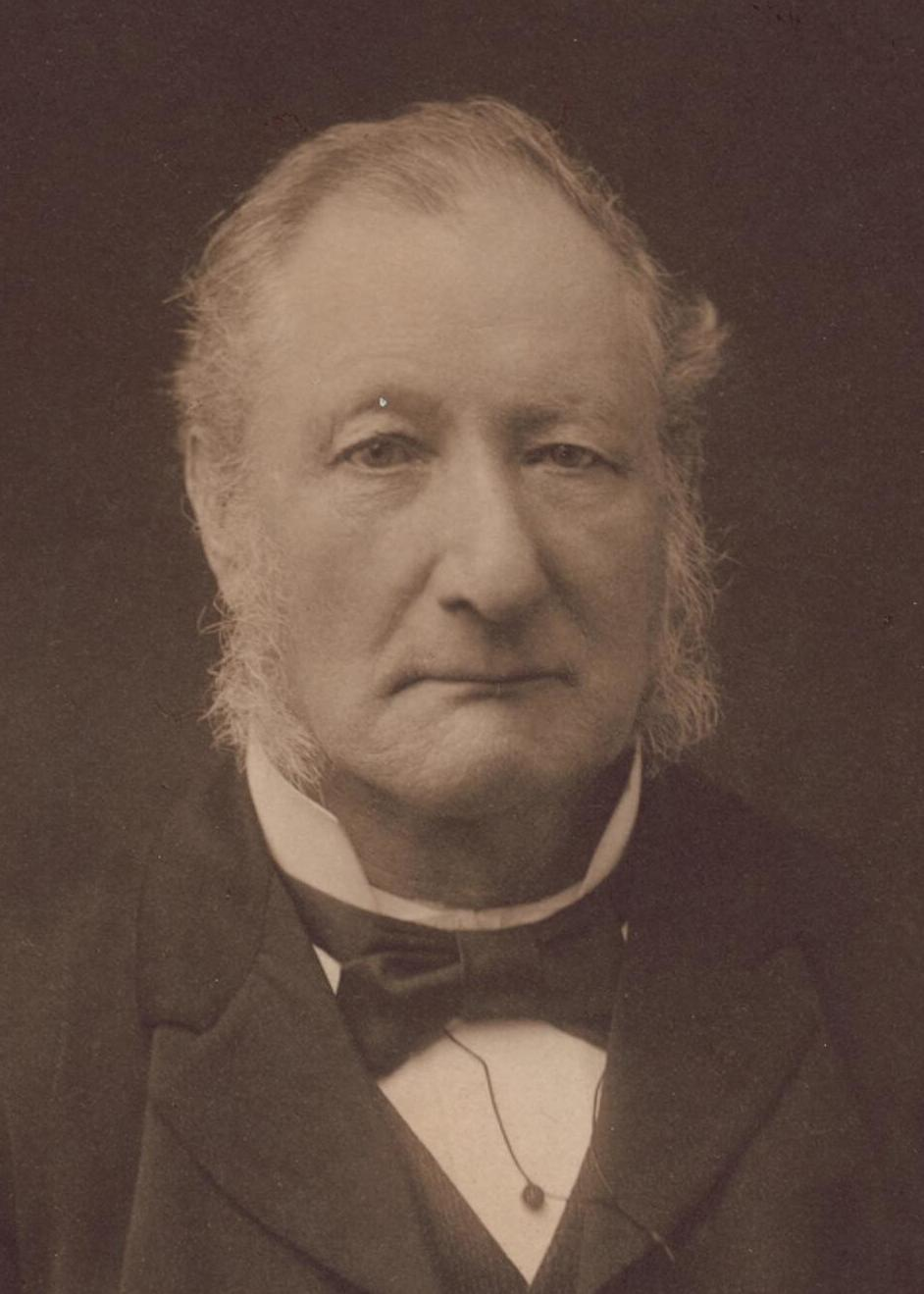

Member of the Australian Parliament for Darling Downs
- In office 30 March 1901 – 8 August 1901
- Succeeded by: Littleton Groom

Speaker of the Queensland Legislative Assembly
- In office 7 November 1883 – 4 April 1888
- Preceded by: Henry Edward King
- Succeeded by: Albert Norton
- Constituency: Drayton and Toowoomba

Member of the Queensland Legislative Assembly for Drayton and Toowoomba
- In office 11 August 1862 – 10 November 1873
- Preceded by: John Watts
- Succeeded by: Seat abolished
- In office 15 November 1878 – 4 June 1901 Serving with George Davenport, Robert Aland, John Fogarty
- Preceded by: New seat
- Succeeded by: James Tolmie

Member of the Queensland Legislative Assembly for Toowoomba
- In office 10 November 1873 – 15 November 1878
- Preceded by: New seat
- Succeeded by: Seat abolished

Personal details
- Born: 9 March 1833 Plymouth, England
- Died: 8 August 1901 (aged 68) Melbourne, Victoria, Australia
- Resting place: Drayton and Toowoomba Cemetery
- Party: Protectionist Party
- Spouse: Grace Littleton
- Relations: Littleton Groom (son), Henry Littleton Groom (son)
- Occupation: Auctioneer

William Henry Groom (9 March 1833 – 8 August 1901) was an English-born Australian publican, newspaper proprietor, and politician who served as a member of the Parliament of Queensland from 1862 to 1901 and of the Parliament of Australia in 1901.

== Early life ==
Groom was born at Plymouth, England, son of Thomas Groom, cordwainer, and his wife Maria, née Harkcom. Groom was educated at St Andrew's College, Plymouth, and apprenticed to a baker. He was transported from England to Australia as a convict in 1846 for seven years, having been convicted of embezzlement, aged just 13. He was eventually released, subsequently convicted again of a similar offence, and served gaol time in the goldfields in what would later be the colony of Victoria. After he was again released, Groom eventually found himself on the Darling Downs in Queensland, where, despite whispers about his chequered past, he became one of the leading members of society.

== Career ==
In 1858 Groom became associated with Toowoomba in connection with his activities and as an auctioneer.

Groom was proprietor of The Toowoomba Chronicle newspaper and one of the founders of the Toowoomba Permanent Building Society (later Heritage Building Society). He was also involved in the creation of the Toowoomba Racecourse Clifford Park, the Toowoomba School of Arts and many other establishments.

== Politics ==
Groom served as an alderman in the Borough of Toowoomba from 1861 to 1901, as well as the town's inaugural mayor in 1861. He went on to serve three consecutive terms as Mayor, and was re-elected to the position again in 1864, 1867, 1883 and 1884. During his first term as Mayor he successfully led his council to petition the colonial government for land for a town hall, a municipal market and the original site for Queens Park.

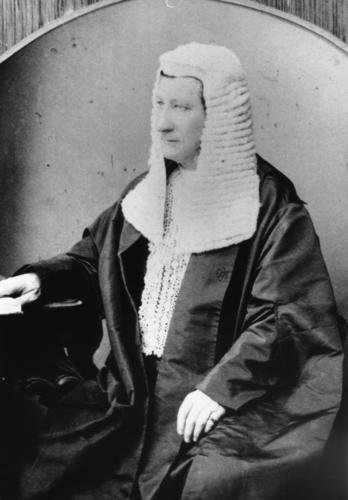
Groom in speaker's garb

In 1862 Groom was elected to the Queensland Legislative Assembly in the electoral district of Toowoomba with a majority of 21 votes. He served as parliamentary speaker from 1883 to 1888.

Groom played a major role in the growth of Toowoomba by securing funding for bridges and arterial roads, the establishment of the General Hospital (now Queensland Health's Toowoomba Base Hospital) and Willowburn Hospital (now Baillie Henderson Hospital).

Groom was elected as a Protectionist to the Darling Downs electorate at the inaugural Australian federal election in 1901, becoming the only transported convict to ever sit as a member of the Australian Parliament.

== Death ==
Unfortunately, he was given little time to enjoy the crowning glory of his political career, as he died on 8 August of the same year at the first Commonwealth Parliament meeting in Melbourne. He died of a combination of bronchial catarrh and heart failure. Groom was the first serving member of the Australian Parliament to die. (Sir James Dickson, Minister for Defence, had died in January, but that was before the first parliament had been elected). Groom's body was returned to Queensland for burial in the Drayton and Toowoomba Cemetery.

== Legacy ==
William Henry Groom was succeeded as the member for Darling Downs by his third son Littleton Groom, who won the seat in Australia's first federal by-election and later became Speaker of the House of Representatives.

William Henry Groom was also the father of Queensland State parliamentarian (MLC) Henry Littleton Groom.

His home, Millbrook, is listed on the Queensland Heritage Register.

== See also ==
- List of convicts transported to Australia
- Political families of Australia

Parliament of Australia
New seat	Member for Darling Downs; 1901	Succeeded by Littleton Groom
Parliament of Queensland
Preceded by Henry Edward King	Speaker of the Legislative Assembly; 1883–1888	Succeeded by Albert Norton
Preceded by John Watts	Member for Drayton and Toowoomba; 1862–1873	Abolished
New seat	Member for Toowoomba; 1873–1878	Abolished
New seat	Member for Drayton and Toowoomba; 1878–1901; Served alongside: George Davenport, Robert Aland, John Fogarty	Succeeded by James Tolmie
