= Thomas Robert Roberts =

Australian politician (1869–1934)

Thomas Roberts
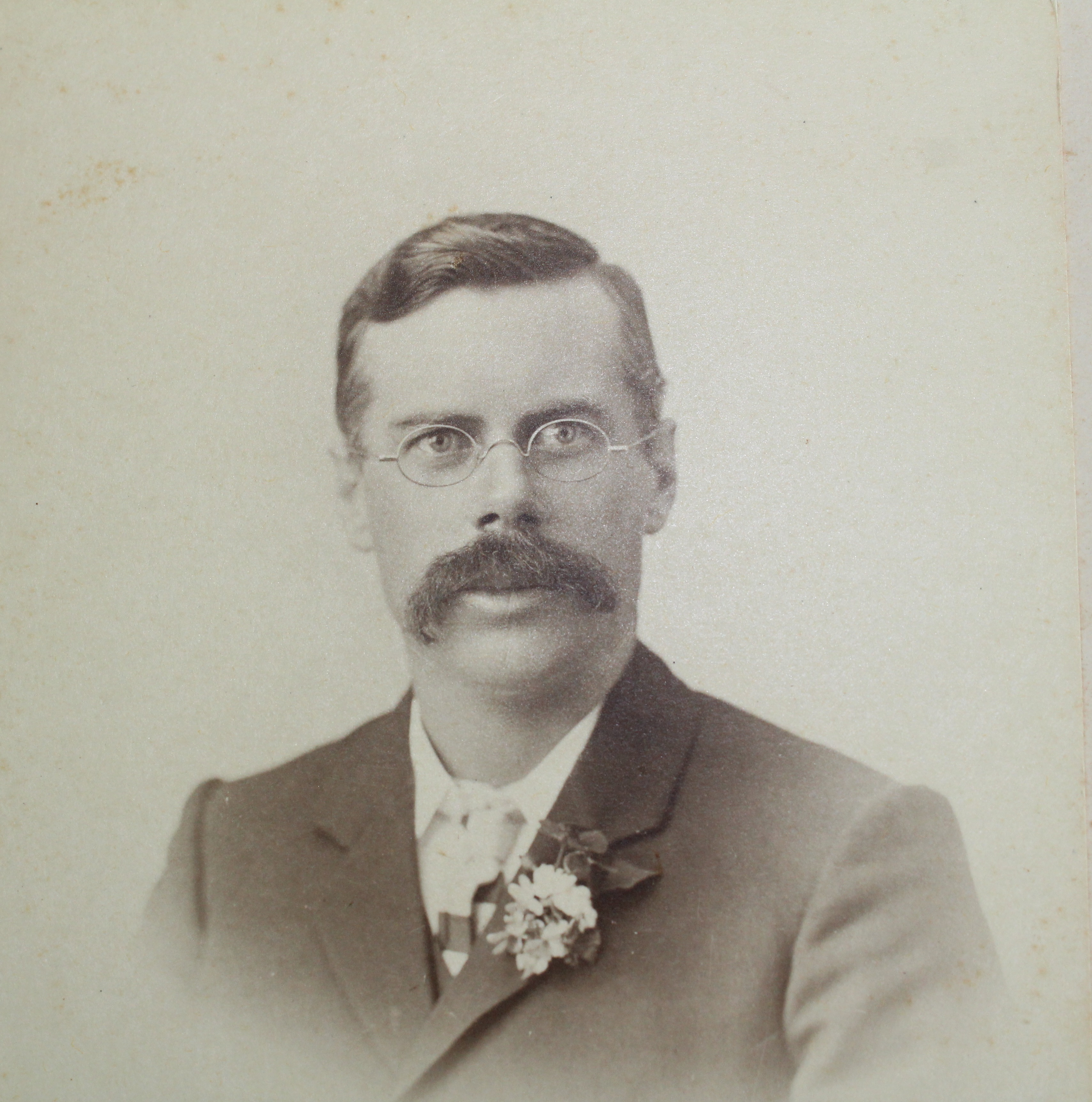

Member of the Queensland Legislative Assembly for Drayton & Toowoomba
- In office 18 May 1907 – 27 April 1912 Serving with Vernon Redwood, James Tolmie
- Preceded by: Edward Smart
- Succeeded by: Seat abolished

Member of the Queensland Legislative Assembly for East Toowoomba
- In office 27 April 1912 – 1 June 1934
- Preceded by: New seat
- Succeeded by: James Annand

Personal details
- Born: Thomas Robert Roberts; 26 June 1869 Hucclecote, Gloucestershire, England
- Died: 2 June 1934 (aged 64) Southport, Queensland, Australia
- Resting place: Drayton and Toowoomba Cemetery
- Party: CPNP
- Other political affiliations: Minsterialist, National, Liberal, Kidstonites
- Spouse: Louise Augusta Muller (m.1895 d.1947)
- Occupation: Tinsmith

Thomas Robert Roberts (26 June 1869 – 1 June 1934) was a tinsmith and member of the Queensland Legislative Assembly.

== Biography ==
Roberts was born at Hucclecote, Gloucestershire, to parents Thomas Roberts and his wife Ann Matilda (née Eycott). He was educated at the Church of England School in Hucclecote. His mother died when was around two years old and he was bought up by his uncle, Thomas Price and learnt the tinsmith trade. He arrived in Queensland in 1890 and opened his own business in Ruthven Street, Toowoomba, The City Dustpan, which he sold in 1926.

On 7 December 1895 he married Louise Augusta Muller (died 1947) and together had one son and three daughters. On 1 June 1934, he travelled to Southport, where he told friends there that he was on a visit for the day and to them he seemed in normal health. Later on into the night though, fishermen caught his body in their nets, about 200 yards from the shore. The police said there were no indications of foul play. His body was taken back to Toowoomba and his funeral proceeded from St Luke's Church of England Church to the Drayton and Toowoomba Cemetery.

== Public career ==
Roberts was an alderman on the Toowoomba City Council for 10 years, including part of the time he spent in the Queensland Parliament. He was a Labour Movement member up until 1907 when William Kidston formed a coalition government whereupon he left the Labour Movement to follow Kidston and from then on supported the parties opposed to Labour.

In 1907, Roberts won the two-member seat of Drayton & Toowoomba for the Ministerialists and held the seat until it was abolished in 1912 and replaced by East Toowoomba. He won the new seat and held it until his death in 1934. He was the Liberal whip in 1918, and, when his party won government in 1929, the Chairman of Committees until the government's defeat in 1932.

He was Secretary, Trustee and State President of the Grand United Order of Odd Fellows and its Grand Master in 1901. He was also the Grand President in Queensland of the Royal Society of St George and a President of the Toowoomba Society for the Prevention of Cruelty. He was involved in many sporting organisations on the Darling Downs including women's hockey, both forms of rugby, and the rifle club.

Parliament of Queensland
Preceded by Edward Smart	Member for Drayton & Toowoomba; 1907–1912; Served alongside: Vernon Redwood, James Tolmie	Abolished
New seat	Member for East Toowoomba; 1912–1934	Succeeded by James Annand
