= George Davenport (Queensland politician) =

Australian politician

Member of the Queensland Legislative Assembly for Drayton and Toowoomba
- In office 15 November 1878 – 1 January 1881 Serving with William Henry Groom
- Preceded by: New seat
- Succeeded by: Robert Aland

Personal details
- Born: George Henry Davenport; 30 October 1831 Oxford, England
- Died: 1 January 1881 (aged 49) Toowoomba, Queensland, Australia
- Resting place: Headington Hill
- Spouse: Elizabeth Young (m.1866 d.1901)
- Occupation: Farmer

George Henry Davenport (1831–1881) was a politician in Queensland, Australia. He was a Member of the Queensland Legislative Assembly.

== Early life ==
George Henry Davenport was born in Oxford, England on 30 October 1831, the son of George Francis Davenport and his wife (and cousin), Eliza (née Davenport). George Henry Davenport was educated at Edinburgh High School. Davenport's father selected land in South Australia in 1839. Two of Davenport's uncles, Robert Davenport and Samuel Davenport, also settled in South Australia. Circa 1850, George Henry Davenport followed his uncles to South Australia soon after leaving school. After a few years he went to live in Melbourne.

== Darling Downs ==
In 1865, Davenport came to Queensland and was in partnership with C.B. Fisher. They were involved in land development where agriculture could be profitably combined with grazing. The property was called Headington Hill. All the newest and latest machinery was used on this property.

Davenport married Elizabeth Young in Dalby on 27 May 1866.

Davenport was the member for the Electoral district of Drayton and Toowoomba in the Queensland Legislative Assembly from 15 November 1878 to 1 January 1881.

Davenport died on New Year's Day 1881 in Toowoomba during his term of office. Davenport was a member of the Church of England.

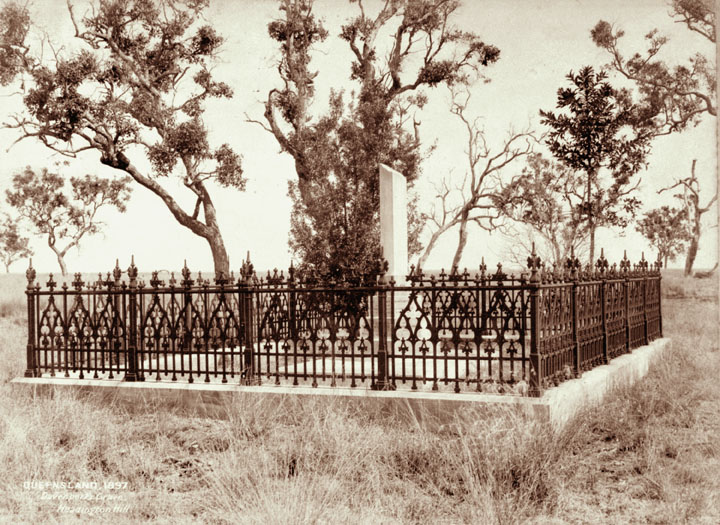
George Davenport's grave at Headington Hill

Parliament of Queensland
New seat	Member for Drayton and Toowoomba; 1878–1881; Served alongside: William Henry Groom	Succeeded by Robert Aland
