= Evan Llewelyn =

Australian politician

Member of the Queensland Legislative Assembly for Toowoomba
- In office 4 April 1925 – 11 May 1929
- Preceded by: Frank Brennan
- Succeeded by: James Annand
- In office 11 June 1932 – 28 November 1935
- Preceded by: James Annand
- Succeeded by: Jack Duggan

Personal details
- Born: Evan John Llewelyn; 30 June 1875 Merthyr Tydfil, South Wales
- Died: 11 June 1967 (aged 91) Toowoomba, Queensland, Australia
- Party: Labor
- Spouse(s): Ottilia Stitt (m.1902 d.1949), Kate Bodsworth (m.1950)
- Children: 3
- Occupation: Ambulance industry

Evan John Llewelyn (30 June 1875 – 11 June 1967) was an Australian politician. He was the Labor member for Toowoomba in the Legislative Assembly of Queensland from 1925 to 1929 and from 1932 to 1935. He was the son of Henry Llewellyn, who was a member of the Queensland Legislative Council from 1917 to 1922.

After leaving school he worked in his father's Gympie news agency, at South Bingera sugar mill and at the Queensland Meat Export Company in Pinkenba. In 1901, he joined the Citizens Forces as an ambulance bearer and later that year joined the Queensland Ambulance Service Transport Brigade in Brisbane. In 1906, he was appointed Senior Bearer at Ipswich and was superintendent of the Toowoomba ambulance centre from 1907 until 1925. After leaving politics, he again became superintendent of the Toowoomba ambulance centre from 1935 until 1954.

Parliament of Queensland
Preceded by Frank Brennan	Member for Toowoomba; 1925–1929	Succeeded by James Annand
Preceded by James Annand	Member for Toowoomba; 1932–1935	Succeeded by Jack Duggan
