= Electoral district of Drayton and Toowoomba =

Coordinates: 27°35′23.25″S 151°55′53.47″E

Drayton and Toowoomba Queensland—Legislative Assembly
- State: Queensland
- Dates current: 1860-1873; 1878-1912
- Namesake: Drayton and Toowoomba

Electoral District of Drayton and Toowoomba was the original seat for the urban settlement on the eastern Darling Downs, Queensland, Australia.

== History ==
Drayton and Toowoomba had 2 incarnations: 1859 to 1873 and 1878 to 1912.

Its first incarnation was as one of original sixteen electorates created in 1859, when Queensland became an independent colony. It was represented by one member. In 1873, its name was changed to electoral district of Toowoomba.

Its second incarnation was in 1878, when Toowoomba was renamed back to Drayton and Toowoomba. It became a 2-member electorate at that time. In 1912, it was redistributed into Drayton (1912–1927), Toowoomba (1912–1960) and East Toowoomba (1912–1950).

The seat is notable for Member and perennial Toowoomba Mayor William Henry Groom who went on to be the region's representative at the first Commonwealth Parliament in 1901.

== Members for Drayton and Toowoomba ==
The table of members elected in Drayton and Toowoomba appears below.

First incarnation

Single member electorate (1860–1873)
Member	Party	Term
John Watts	Unaligned	1860–1862
William Henry Groom	Unaligned	1862–1873

Second incarnation

Dual member electorate (1878–1912)
Member	Party	Term	Member	Party	Term
William Henry Groom	Unaligned	1878–1901	George Davenport	Unaligned	1878–1881
William Henry Groom	Unaligned	1878–1901	Robert Aland	Unaligned	1881–1893
William Henry Groom	Unaligned	1878–1901	John Fogarty	Labor/Opposition	1893–1904
James Tolmie	Ministerialist/Opposition	1901–1907	John Fogarty	Labor/Opposition	1893–1904
James Tolmie	Ministerialist/Opposition	1901–1907	Edward Smart	Labor	1904–1907
Vernon Redwood	Ministerialist/Opposition	1907–1909	Thomas Roberts	Ministerialist/Opposition	1907–1912
James Tolmie	Ministerialist/Opposition	1909–1912	Thomas Roberts	Ministerialist/Opposition	1907–1912

== See also ==
- Electoral districts of Queensland
- Members of the Queensland Legislative Assembly by year
- Category:Members of the Queensland Legislative Assembly by name
