= John Fogarty (Australian politician) =

Australian politician

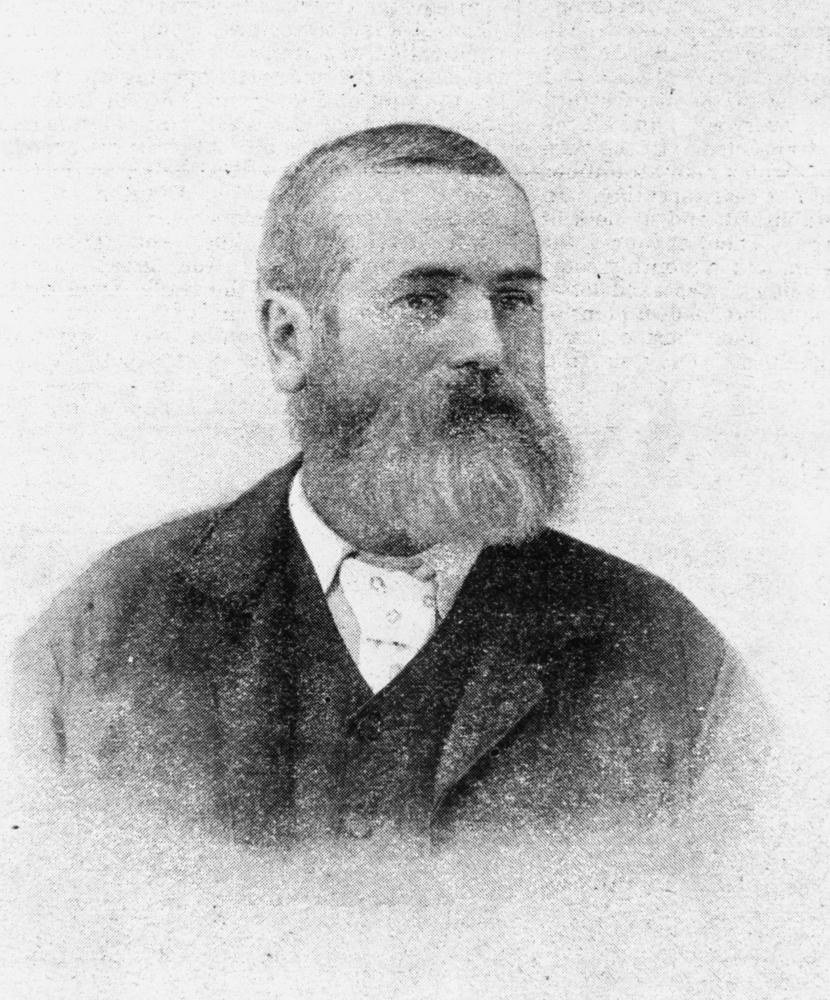

Member of the Queensland Legislative Assembly for Drayton and Toowoomba
- In office 6 May 1893 – 9 September 1904 Serving with William Henry Groom, James Tolmie
- Preceded by: Robert Aland
- Succeeded by: Edward Smart

Personal details
- Born: 1848 Tipperary, Ireland
- Died: 9 September 1904 (aged 55–56) Toowoomba, Queensland
- Resting place: Drayton and Toowoomba Cemetery
- Party: Ministerial
- Other political affiliations: Labor
- Spouse: Matilda Revell
- Occupation: Grocer, Publican

John Fogarty (1848–1904) was an Australian politician. From 1893 to 1904, he was a Member of the Queensland Legislative Assembly for the Electoral district of Drayton and Toowoomba. He was also the mayor of Toowoomba.

Fogarty died in office and is buried in Drayton and Toowoomba Cemetery.

Parliament of Queensland
Preceded by Robert Aland	Member for Drayton and Toowoomba; 1893–1904; Served alongside: William Henry Groom, James Tolmie	Succeeded by Edward Smart
