= Toowoomba Permanent Building Society =

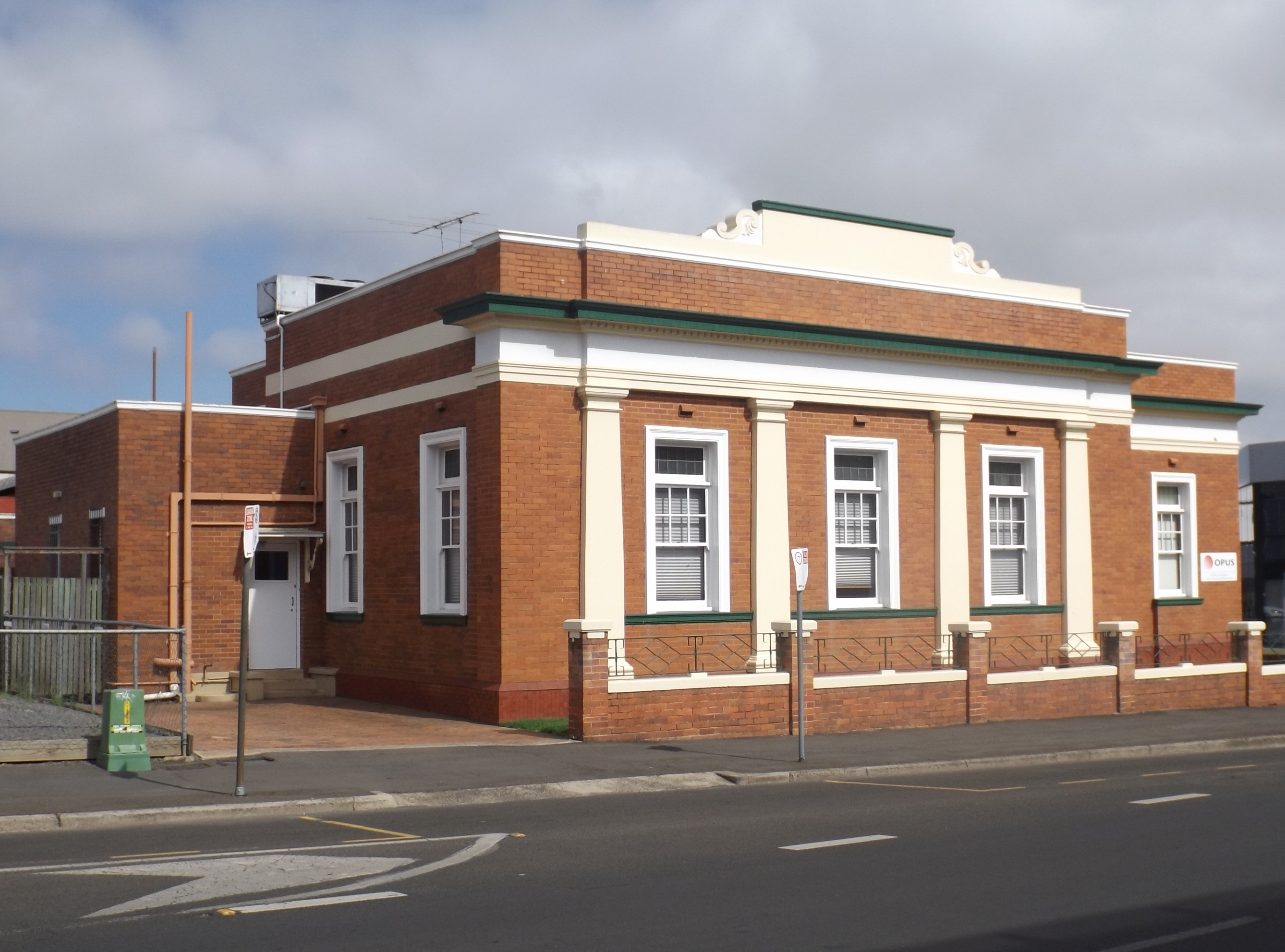
- 2014

- Location within Queensland Location within Australia
- 27.5596°S 151.9556°E
- Location: 2 Russell Street, Toowoomba, Toowoomba Region, Queensland, Australia

History
- Design period: 1919–1930s (interwar period)
- Built: 1934–1982

Site notes
- Architect: William Hodgen

Queensland Heritage Register
- Official name: Toowoomba Permanent Building Society (former), Cleary and Lee Solicitors, Toowoomba Permanent Benefit Building and Investment Society
- Type: state heritage (built)
- Designated: 21 October 1992
- Reference no.: 600859
- Significant period: 1930s (fabric); 1934–1979 (historical use)
- Significant components: garage, fence/wall – perimeter, strong room

Toowoomba Permanent Building Society is a heritage-listed former building society at 2 Russell Street, Toowoomba, Toowoomba Region, Queensland, Australia. It was designed by William Hodgen and built from 1934 to 1982. It is also known as Cleary & Lee Solicitors and Toowoomba Permanent Benefit Building and Investment Society. It was added to the Queensland Heritage Register on 21 October 1992.

== History ==
The former Toowoomba Permanent Benefit Building and Investment Society building was designed as a solid and austere edifice of red facing brick. It was constructed in 1934 by contractor WR Smith, at a cost of £4390. The design was by prominent Toowoomba architect, William Hodgen. The building was Hodgen's last major work produced by him before his death in 1943. The building was extended on the western side in 1982.

The Toowoomba Permanent Benefit Building and Investment Society was established in 1875 in offices in Margaret Street. As the business expanded larger accommodation was sought in 1906 in Russell Street. In 1934 a decision was made to build an office on another site in Russell Street and these premises were opened in October 1934. The Toowoomba Permanent Building Society remained in this building until 1979.

The Toowoomba Permanent Building Society was the third permanent building society to be established in 1874, the other two societies being established in Brisbane in July and August. The establishment of a permanent building society had come about following the formation and subsequent closure of a number of terminating societies. Evidence suggests that the first terminating society was formed in Toowoomba late in 1862, on the initiative of William Henry Groom, the first Mayor of Toowoomba. The permanent society differed to the terminating society in that its system accredited interest annually rather that at termination.

Most Australian building societies were larger in size and function than the British societies with a tendency to evolve into building companies, land and mortgage banks or estate companies. They also tended to rely on small overdrafts from the trading banks in times of financial crisis or economic recession. Hence, in Australia, building society interest rates were frequently subject to the prevailing rates set by the banks, and the bank crash of 1893 was even the ruin of a number of dependent societies.

On 16 Sept 1874, the Toowoomba Chronicle's Brisbane correspondent published an editorial comment on the principles of co-operation and self-help reflected in the building society movement. The article emphasised how "an industrious man [has] an excellent opportunity to shake himself...free of his landlord...it facilitates the settlement in and around the settlement of trade of a....body of people who, having secured a stake in a place...are not tempted to migrate upon every trivial occasion..."

The benefits of retaining an itinerant workforce in or near a town meant increased population and, accordingly, increased prosperity. Such increases ultimately benefited the local building and agricultural industries, as well as commerce and trade. Greater government revenue became available through taxation and could be channelled into public works to the advantage of the town. The formation of the building society played an integral part in such economic growth. If wage earners could be encouraged to secure their own piece of land, they would make a contribution to the prosperity of the town.

Since 1876 the office of the Toowoomba Permanent Building Society had been located in a suite of rooms in Beirne's Chambers in Margaret Street. With the increased workload associated with the expansion of the business at the turn of the century, these premises became too cramped. By September 1905, the Directors began looking for new premises. In January 1906, rather than tendering for a new building, and declining Beirne's offer of the current premises for £1 per week, the Society called for offers of existing buildings. Within a week, the Society had six offers. On 15 January 1906, the Society accepted half of Bernard Dowd's offer for £1500 for premises situated on the southern side of Russell Street. Marks and Sons architects prepared plans and specifications for the renovation of the premises. The lowest tender, by HC Olsen for £260 and eight weeks, was accepted on 13 March 1906.

Several modifications of this office occurred, particularly in the 1920s. These included modifications to the office balcony, installation of iron bars on rear windows, the installation of a telephone, and later, plans were initiated to connect the office to the sewerage system. In 1928, no action was taken by the Society on the request from the City Electric and Radio Service to improve the lighting of the building and to install "electric advertising".

Given the many modifications to the building, the Society began to consider moving to larger premises. In October 1929 the Board appointed a sub-committee to consider the question of new office premises and equipment. Failing to report by mid-1930, the sub-committee was urged to consider the alteration of the existing office to accommodate new equipment. In August it reported that no further alterations should be made, "but that a suitable site be procured, and a building erected, that will meet the requirements of the Society for the next 25 years and that the foundation of the building be of sufficient strength to carry a two-storeyed building". The matter, however, was not dealt with for some time while the Board was preoccupied with the requirements resulting from the Depression.

In July 1932, the question of office accommodation was revived and the search for a site recommenced. Several possibilities were discussed including a site at the corner of Neil and Little Russell Streets. In June 1933, a new sub-committee comprising Director, HE Brown; an accountant, HJ Parsons and WR Smith, a builder-contractor, was given the brief of finding new premises or land within three weeks. On 20 July 1933, the sub-committee reported the purchase of the a property on the corner of Neil and Russell Streets from Mrs DE Campbell for £1500, including the existing dwelling valued at £300, which was sold at public auction in October. The Board ratified the purchase and engaged architect William Hodgen, a former director, to draw up plans and estimates. On 18 October 1933, with Hodgen's estimate of £4390 and twenty-six weeks, was successful. Over the next few months there were several "extras" brought before the Board, including sums for doors, steps and porch gates (£36); fanlights (£7-10-0) and a dwarf wall (£75). There was also the question of fences, lawns and cementing the driveway from the street to the garage.

The new premises were ready for occupation in mid-October and the Society celebrated the move with a photograph and publicity piece in the Toowoomba Chronicle. The Board held its first meeting in the new Board Room on 18 October 1934.

Between 1934 and 1979 the building served as the office and public symbol of the Toowoomba Permanent Building Society. Its corner position at the intersection of Neil and Russell Streets ensured that the building and its grounds were prominent in the streetscape. In August 1977, a special meeting of members authorised a change in name from the Toowoomba Permanent Benefit Building and Investment Society to the Toowoomba Permanent Building Society. The Society moved to new premises in Ruthven Street in March 1979.

Extensions to the building were carried out in 1982, when the building was occupied by Cleary and Lee Solicitors. Extensions included placing a second entrance, a French door bordered by Doric pilasters, on the western side of the main entry. Part of the fence along Russell Street was demolished, following extensions to the building, to provide for a parking area.

When the Toowoomba Permanent Building Society vacated the premises in 1976 a time capsule was placed behind the plaque on the south wall of the plaza in the interior of the building, to be opened in 2026. The legal firm of Cleary and Lee Solicitors leased the building for a number of years from March 1980, however, the building is currently unoccupied.

== Description ==
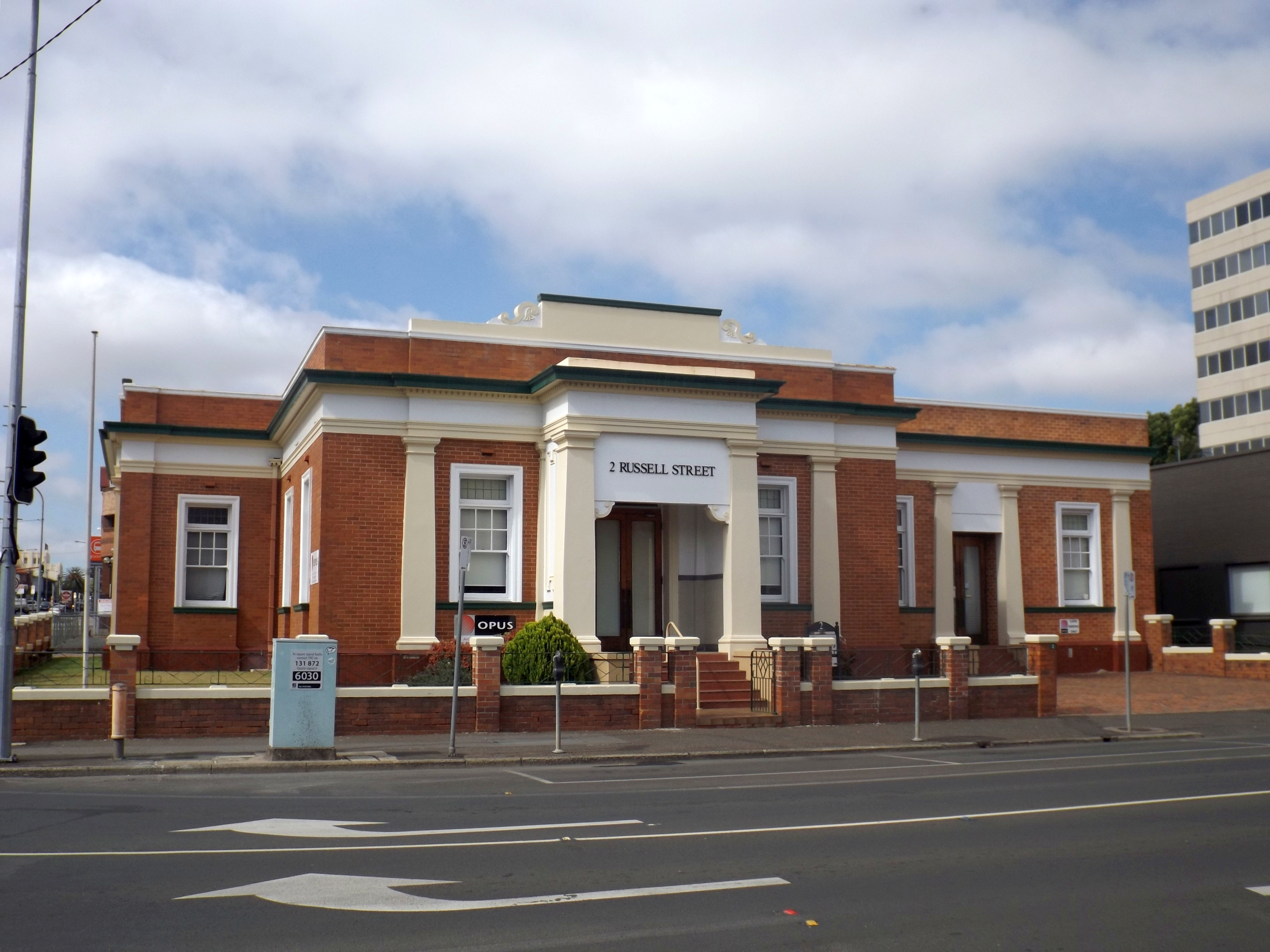
Russell Street side, 2014

The former Toowoomba Permanent Building Society building is a single storey, facebrick building constructed in 1934 with later extensions to the western side, located in a prominent position on the corner of Russell and Neil Streets, Toowoomba.

The northern (front) elevation of the building, facing Russell Street, has a prominent, projecting, rendered front portico with a set of stairs leading to the entry, which has terrazzo tiles and timber framed French doors and a breezeway assembly with decorative glass. Double hung sash, timber framed windows are located along the front facade, including in the extensions of the western side of the property, and also along the eastern elevation, facing Neil Street. All the windows have a breezeway assembly with glass panels. A second entrance, with timber French doors, is located at the western end of the northern elevation, forming part of the later extensions. The rendered pediment is located right around the building and conceals the hipped roof clad with tiles. Raised lettering reading "CLEARY AND LEE SOLICITORS" is located along the top of the projecting portico and along the eastern elevation.

Along the northern and eastern elevations, the building has decorative rendered and painted mouldings and a dentilled cornice. The facebrick western elevation has no windows or entrances. The southern (rear) elevation has timber framed, double hung sash windows along the elevation.

The original, detached facebrick garage located in the south-western corner of the site, now attached to the main building, is still apparent. The parapet concealing the hipped roof clad with corrugated galvanised iron is still extant.

Internally, the former Toowoomba Permanent Building Society has a large open area which forms the main section of the building. The large space has been divided into a number of workspaces using partitions. The plaster ceiling in the room is divided into panels which have decorative plaster dentilled cornices and mouldings. The rendered walls have a timber dado rail located around the room. Doric pilasters are located on all internal walls in the main part of the original section.

In the original section, offices are located along the eastern side of the building. The walls in the offices have been rendered and each have a timber dado rail and picture rail. Most of the offices have a dentilled plaster cornice, however, one, at the southern end of the building has only a moulded plaster cornice, without dentils. The original strong room is still extant and is located on the southern side of the building. An office on the western side of the building, forming part of the original section, has been refurbished, including the lowering of the ceiling. A panelled, timber door, with sidelights, located in the north-western corner of the office, opens to the main office area. Toilets and kitchen facilities, with recent renovations, are located on the southern side of the building.

Brick extensions have been undertaken on the western side of the building. In this section, a number of offices open from a central corridor. These offices are austere with simple, decorative plaster cornices. The decorative plaster ceiling in the front office, which faces Russell Street are slightly more detailed. The original garage, which functioned also as a store room, located in the south-western corner is now divided into two offices. Similar to the other offices, these spaces are austere with simple, decorative plaster cornices.

A low, brick fence with rendered capitals on the plinths is located along the northern and eastern sides of the building and along part of the western side.

== Heritage listing ==
The former Toowoomba Permanent Building Society building was listed on the Queensland Heritage Register on 21 October 1992 having satisfied the following criteria.

The place is important in demonstrating the evolution or pattern of Queensland's history.

Designed in 1934 by William Hodgen, former director of the Toowoomba Permanent Building Society and noted Toowoomba architect, the former Toowoomba Permanent Building Society, is significant as an example of a purpose-built commercial premise. The building is the last major work designed by Hodgen before his death in 1943, and served for many years as a public symbol of the Toowoomba Permanent Building Society.

The place is important in demonstrating the principal characteristics of a particular class of cultural places.

A good example of a typical monument of 1930s commercial enterprise, the former Toowoomba Permanent Building Society building is single story and austere building with classical Georgian elements. The fence and grounds of the building are significant as elements of the original concept portraying domesticity rather than a commercial enterprise.

The place is important because of its aesthetic significance.

Located at the corner of Russell and Neil Streets, with its specifically designed low, brick and iron fence, the former Toowoomba Permanent Building Society building is significant for its contribution to the streetscape.

The place has a special association with the life or work of a particular person, group or organisation of importance in Queensland's history.

The former Toowoomba Permanent Building Society building is significant for its association with one of Toowoomba's oldest businesses and one of Queensland's longest-operating permanent building society's, and for its association with the members of the Society.
