= Immortelle (cemetery) =

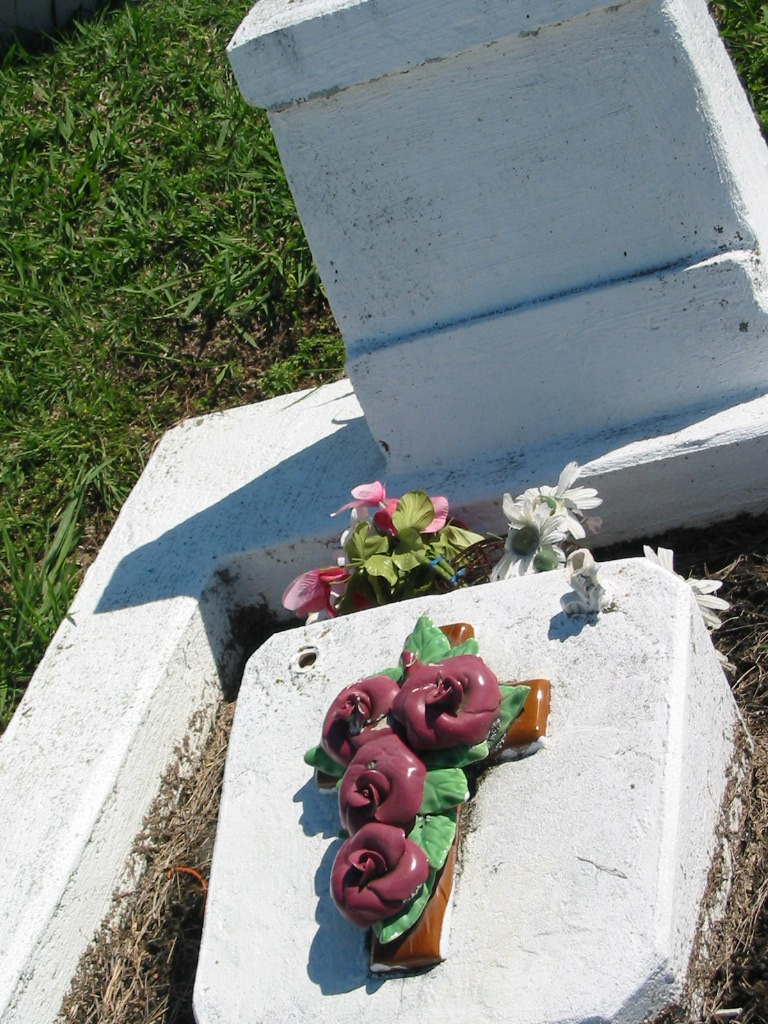
Ceramic Immortelle, Mt Beppo Apostolic Cemetery, 2005

An immortelle is a long-lasting flower arrangement placed on graves in cemeteries.

They were originally made from natural dried flowers (which lasted longer than fresh flowers) or could be made from artificial materials such as china and painted plaster of paris or beads strung on wire arrangements. Unless made of a highly durable material (e.g. china), they would often be enclosed in a glass container (known as globes) to protect them from the weather. In some cases, they were embedded into the grave itself (e.g. on the concrete over the grave) while others were merely placed on or by the grave.

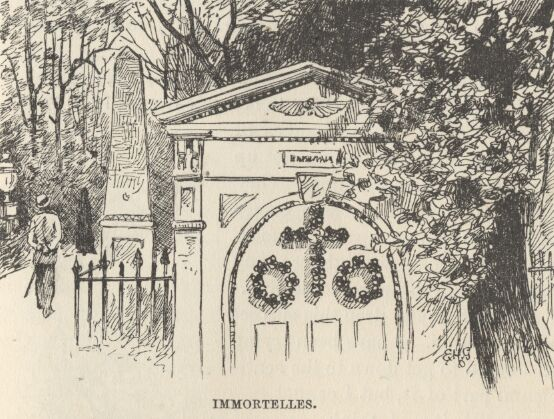
Immortelles, from Life on the Mississippi by Mark Twain, 1883

In Life on the Mississippi, Mark Twain comments on burial practices in New Orleans: "They bury their dead in vaults, above the ground. ... Fresh flowers, in vases of water, are to be seen at the portals of many of the vaults: placed there by the pious hands of bereaved parents and children, husbands and wives, and renewed daily. A milder form of sorrow finds its inexpensive and lasting remembrancer in the coarse and ugly but indestructible 'immortelle'—which is a wreath or cross or some such emblem, made of rosettes of black linen, with sometimes a yellow rosette at the conjunction of the cross's bars—kind of sorrowful breast-pin, so to say. The immortelle requires no attention: you just hang it up, and there you are; just leave it alone, it will take care of your grief for you, and keep it in mind better than you can; stands weather first-rate, and lasts like boiler-iron."

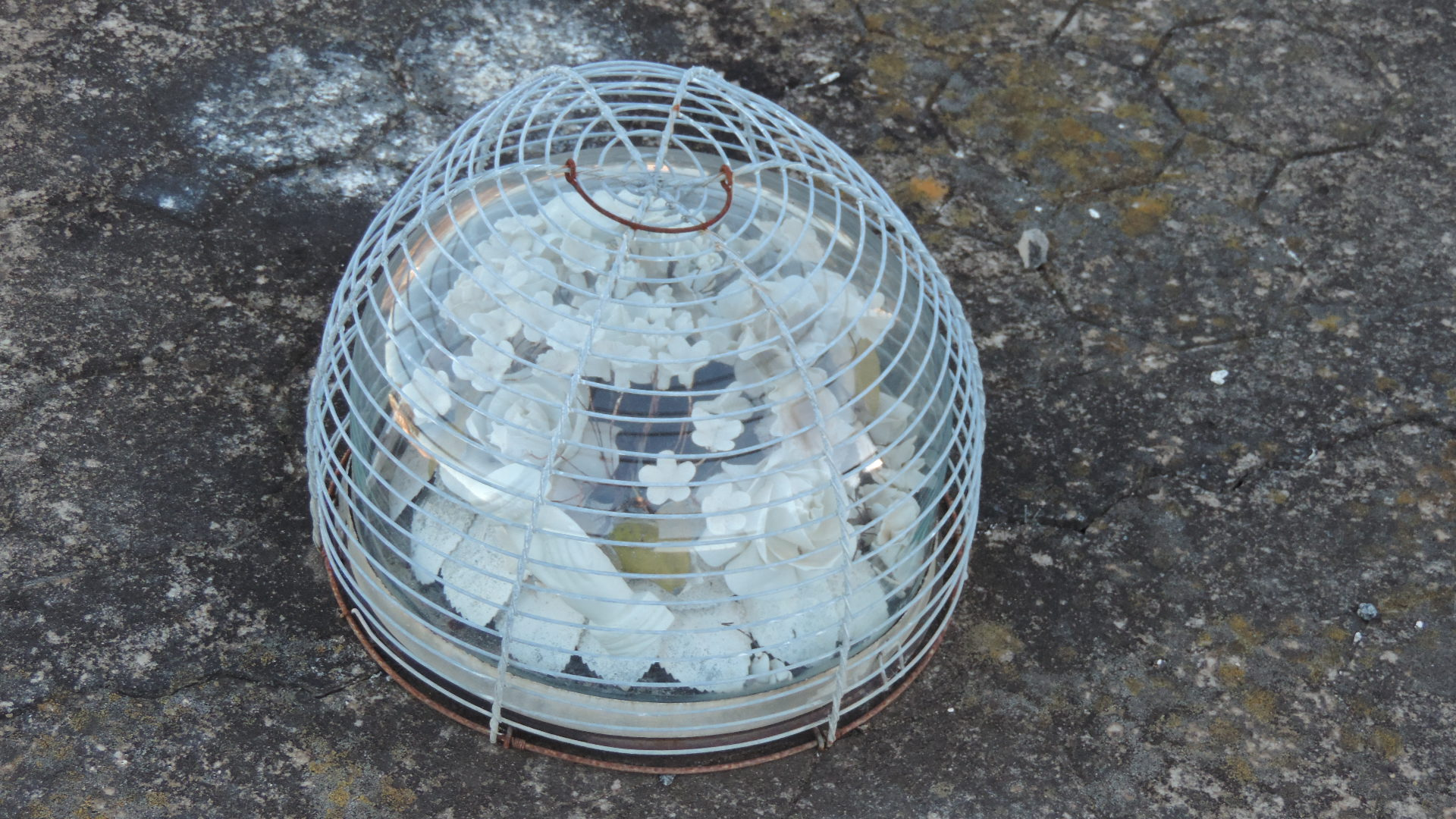
Immortelle, Allora Cemetery, 2015

Immortelles were popular in Australia in the early 20th century. Being more expensive than fresh flowers, immortelles were normally left on graves by close family. They were purchased from undertakers.

In recent times, plastic flowers have replaced immortelles as a long-lasting flower arrangement for use with graves. Therefore, immortelles will mostly only be seen on older graves.

== See also ==
- Veneration of the dead
