= James Douglas Annand =

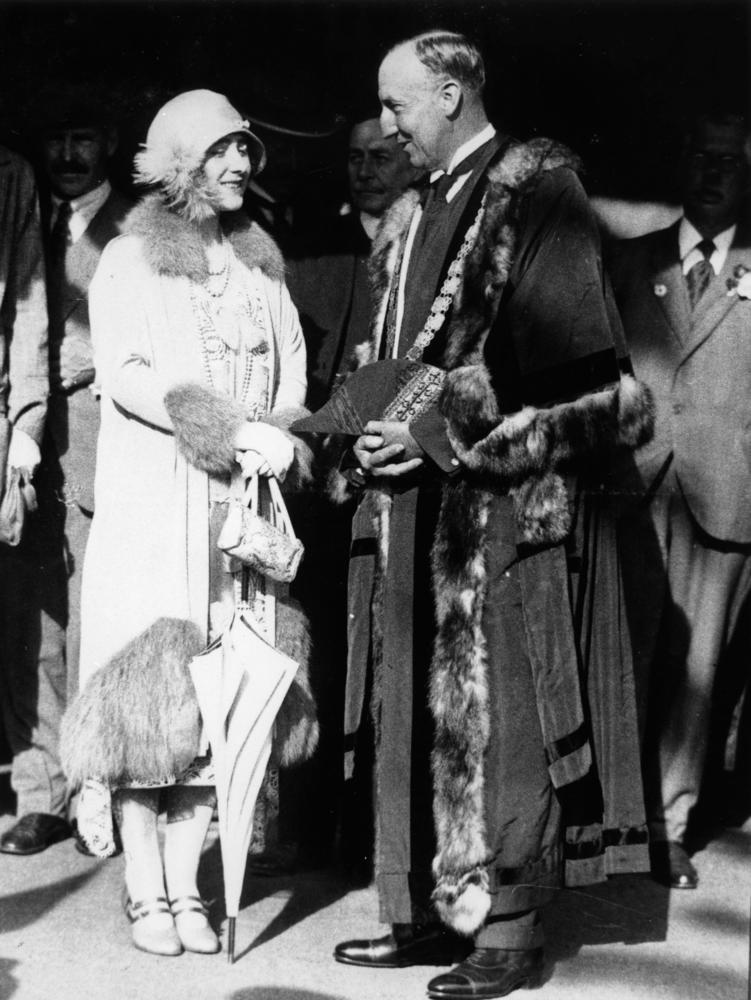
- James Douglas Annand with the Duchess of York, in 1927.

Member of the Queensland Legislative Assembly for Toowoomba
- In office 11 May 1929 – 11 June 1932
- Preceded by: Evan Llewelyn
- Succeeded by: Evan Llewelyn

Member of the Queensland Legislative Assembly for East Toowoomba
- In office 18 Aug 1934 – 11 May 1935
- Preceded by: Robert Roberts
- Succeeded by: James Kane

Personal details
- Born: 13 July 1875 Ipswich, Queensland
- Died: 13 July 1952 (aged 77) Brisbane, Queensland
- Party: Country Party
- Spouse: Isabella Julia Walker
- Occupation: Clerk, Draper

James Douglas Annand (13 July 1875 – 13 July 1952) was an Australian politician and mayor of Toowoomba, Queensland. Serving for 22 years between 1924 and 1952, he was Toowoomba's longest-serving mayor. Born in Ipswich but raised in Toowoomba, he operated a drapery business for many years and also owned land near Hannaford in the Surat district.

== Mayor of Toowoomba ==
Annand was mayor of Toowoomba for three separate terms from 1924 to 1930, 1933–1949, and June 1952 – August 1952. As mayor, one of his major projects was the construction of the Cooby Dam.

== State politics ==
Annand represented the seat of Toowoomba from 1929 to 1932 and East Toowoomba from 1934 to 1935.

== Personal life ==
Annand had married Isabella Julia Walker on 17 March 1904. He died in Brisbane in 1952 and was cremated at Mount Thompson crematorium.

Parliament of Queensland
| Preceded by Evan Llewelyn | Member for Toowoomba; 1929–1932 | Succeeded by Evan Llewelyn |
| Preceded by Robert Roberts | Member for East Toowoomba; 1934–1935 | Succeeded by James Kane |
