= Drayton and Toowoomba Cemetery =

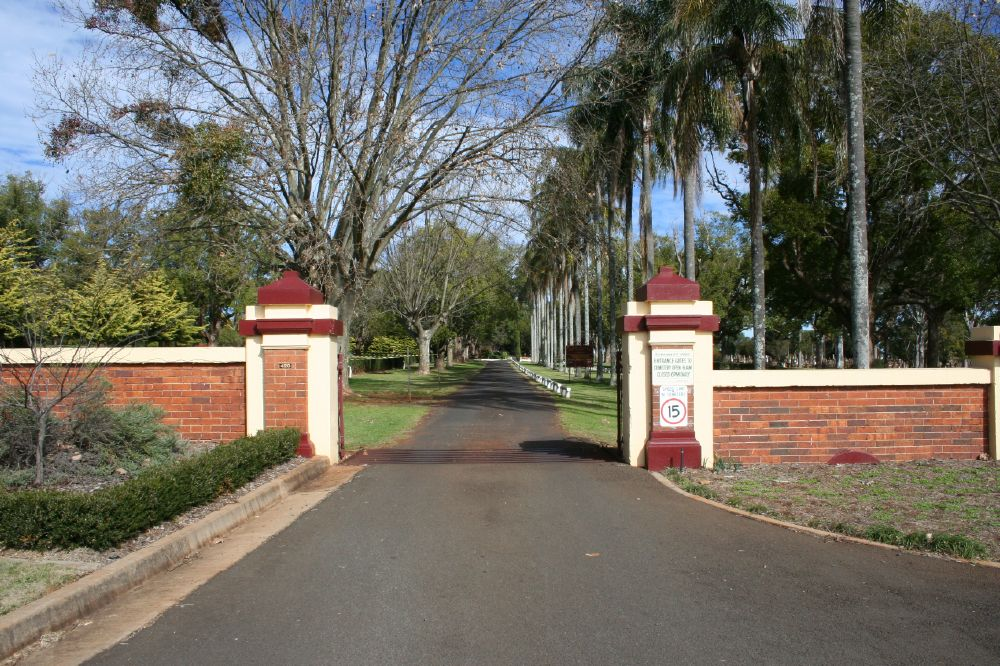
- Entrance, Drayton and Toowoomba Cemetery, 2009

- Location within Queensland Location within Australia
- 27.5766°S 151.9195°E
- Location: cnr South Street and Anzac Avenue, Harristown, Queensland, Australia

History
- Design period: 1840s–1860s (mid-19th century)
- Built: 1850s onwards

Queensland Heritage Register
- Official name: Drayton and Toowoomba Cemetery
- Type: state heritage (built, archaeological, landscape)
- Designated: 14 August 2009
- Reference no.: 602718
- Significant period: 1850 onwards
- Significant components: memorial – garden, driveway, ground depression, sarcophagus, gate – entrance, memorial/monument, burial/grave, grave surrounds/railings, pathway/walkway, vista/s, headstone, trees/plantings, garden/grounds, shed – shelter, denominational divisions, objects (movable) – burial ground (funerary), trees of social, historic or special significance, tree groups – avenue of, mausoleum/tomb/funeral vault/ossario

Drayton and Toowoomba Cemetery is a heritage-listed cemetery at the corner of South Street and Anzac Avenue, Harristown, Queensland, Australia. It was surveyed in May 1850, and is one of the earliest surviving cemeteries in Queensland. The cemetery is large, containing over 45,000 burials. It has been run by the City of Toowoomba, and its successor the Toowoomba Regional Council, since 1974; previously it was run by government-appointed trustees. Many prominent people associated with the Darling Downs are buried in the cemetery, and all sections of the cemetery remain in use. Notable Toowoomba stonemasons R. C. Ziegler & Son, Henry Bailey, Walter Bruce, John H. Wagner and the Bruce Brothers are all associated with monuments within the cemetery.

The cemetery was originally divided into denominational sections, with sections for Roman Catholics, Anglicans, Wesleyans, Congregationalists, Jews and Pagans; the latter two were converted into a cemetery for ex-military personnel around the 1950s, and sections for paupers, stillborn babies and Muslims have also been added. The cemetery reserve was extended between 1870 and 1873, with significant improvements being made to the site in the 1870s as Toowoomba developed as a regional centre. Smaller expansions to the cemetery reserve were made in 1882 and 1906. Three shelter-sheds were built (c. 1930), which survive and are part of the cemetery's heritage listing. The cemetery was again expanded in 1957 following concerns that the existing reserve would soon be fully occupied, but little of this has been utilised.

The cemetery was neglected during the 1960s, and by the 1970s many of the graves were overgrown, or had deteriorated or been vandalised. Administration of the cemetery passed to the City of Toowoomba in 1974, with the council restoring the site. A further reserve was transferred to the Council for cemetery purposes in 1987, but has not been used. It was added to the Queensland Heritage Register on 14 August 2009; the heritage listing does not include the 1957 and 1987 reserve expansions.

== History ==
The Drayton and Toowoomba Cemetery, surveyed in May 1850, was the first official burial ground for the Drayton-Toowoomba district, and the second on the Darling Downs (the Warwick General Cemetery was surveyed two months earlier). The site was expanded to close to its present extent in the early 1870s. It is a large cemetery with over 45,000 burials, illustrative of the first phase of non-Indigenous settlement on the Downs, and of the consolidation of Toowoomba as an important regional centre from the mid-nineteenth century.

As one of the earliest surviving public burial grounds in Queensland, the Drayton and Toowoomba Cemetery can be compared with the Nundah Cemetery (established in the 1840s by German missionaries and surveyed as a public cemetery in 1862); Dunwich Cemetery (earliest identified burials date to 1847, although possibly not surveyed until 1850); and the Warwick General Cemetery (surveyed in March 1850, earliest identified burial 1853). It pre-dates a number of other early and historic surviving public cemeteries in Queensland, including those at South Rockhampton (1860); West End at Townsville (1865); South Brisbane (1866), Ipswich (first recorded burial 1868), and Toowong (established 1866, formally opened 1875).

Early cemeteries are important records of the pattern of non-indigenous settlement in Queensland. Prior to 1856 there was no provision for the civil recording of deaths in New South Wales (of which Queensland was still part), and often no churches in newly settled districts to keep this record. For example, along with a brief newspaper notice, the earliest identified headstone at the Drayton and Toowoomba Cemetery is the only other public record of the death of Michael Gorry, a young Drayton storekeeper who died on 25 March 1852, aged 28.

Drayton evolved after Thomas Alford opened a store and inn at a place called The Springs on Westbrook Creek in 1843, to service travellers and the newly established pastoral runs of the Darling Downs. Located at the intersection of two tracks leading from the south and west to Gorman's and Hodgson's gaps in the Main Range, the site soon attracted other trades and stores. The Alfords named their home Drayton, and in 1845 this became the official name of the settlement. Many considered Drayton would emerge as the premier township on the Downs, and its survey took priority over other village settlements. In 1849 government surveyor James Charles Burnett prepared a design for the town of Drayton and chose a site 3–4 miles (4.8–6.4 km) to the north-east for suburban allotments of 27–40 acres (11–16 ha). Located where two swampy creeks converged as the headwaters of Gowrie Creek, this area was known as The Swamp/s or the Drayton Swamp, and later as Toowoomba.

When preparing the detailed survey of Drayton in 1850, Burnett added a cemetery to the north of the village, midway between Drayton town and the Drayton Swamp suburban allotments, on slightly elevated land close to the road connecting the two settlements. Prior to this, persons who died at Drayton had been buried near their homes along Westbrook Creek, and behind Dr Hopkin's hospital near the centre of the township. Burnett set aside 8 acres (3.2 hectares) divided into denominational sections: Roman Catholics were allotted 2 acres (0.81 hectares) in the north-east quarter; Episcopalians (Church of England) 2 acres (0.81 ha) in the south-east; 1 acre (0.40 hectares) each was set aside in the western half for Presbyterians, Wesleyans, and Congregationalists; and the north-west corner was divided into 2 roods (22,000 sq ft; 2,000 m^{2}) each for Jews and Pagans. During the 1850s each denomination was expected to maintain its own section of the Drayton burial ground, but it became neglected, with cattle and pigs roaming across.

By March 1851 the population of Drayton had reached about 200, and concern was being expressed about the adequacy of the water supply obtained from Westbrook Creek to serve the growing community. From this period the Drayton Swamp, with its greater water supply, became a more attractive proposition for an urban settlement. A bridle track had been formed through the swamp and along the route over the Range that later became the toll road, and in the early 1850s William Horton of Drayton began subdividing land at the Swamp, constructing a bridge and a public house to encourage buyers. In August 1852 Thomas Alford of Drayton opened the first general store at Drayton Swamp, which he called the Toowoomba General Store. In response to public demand, from late 1852 the New South Wales government began the survey of smaller parcels of 1–2 acres (0.40–0.81 ha) and the laying out of streets and town sections. By the time Queensland separated from New South Wales in December 1859, Drayton Swamp had become the town of Toowoomba, with municipal status granted on 19 November 1860. At the time of the 1861 census, it was clear that Toowoomba, with a population of 1183 compared with Drayton's 320, had become the principal settlement.

With Toowoomba becoming more established there was a correspondingly greater use being made of the cemetery, as evidenced by a number of surviving headstones from the early 1860s. By September 1863, Toowoomba Anglicans were contemplating construction of a mortuary chapel and a new fence to their section of the burial ground, as soon as funds could be obtained. In July 1864, the Queensland government issued a deed of grant to Church of England trustees for the 2 acres (0.81 ha) of the cemetery set aside for Episcopalian use in 1850, although a survey office sketch plan of the cemetery drawn in October the same year makes it clear that Anglican burials were taking place in the north-east quarter of the cemetery, and Roman Catholic burials in the south-east – the reverse of Burnett's 1850 layout.

Following the introduction of The Cemeteries Act of 1865, which provided for the regulation of cemeteries throughout Queensland, seven trustees from Toowoomba (representing the principal religious denominations in the district) were appointed in November 1866 to manage the whole 8 acres (3.2 ha) of the Drayton and Toowoomba Cemetery. Two of these trustees – William Henry Groom (first Mayor of Toowoomba) and Samuel George Stephens – remained on the board for almost 40 years and both are buried in the cemetery. The new trustees immediately prepared cemetery by-laws, which were approved by Governor-in-Council in January 1867, and the first recorded burial was made on 16 December 1866. In 1867 the first sexton was appointed, and only he could open a grave in the cemetery.

In 1868 a mortuary chapel was erected by the Anglican community of Toowoomba and Drayton. This was located just north of the Church of England burial ground, technically outside the cemetery reserve at the time. The timber building, which could seat 60 to 70 persons, had been removed from Ballard's Camp on the Main Range Railway, gifted by Samuel Wilcox, agent for railway contractors Peto, Brassey and Betts, after the railway was completed and the camp disbanded. A belfry and bell were erected adjacent to the chapel in 1871. None of these structures has survived.

Toowoomba grew rapidly during the 1860s. By the census of September 1871 its population had reached 3,543, compared with Drayton's 792. Between September 1870 and August 1873 the cemetery reserve was extended to close to its present size, creating a total area of just under 67 acres (27 hectares) and gaining extensive frontages to the Drayton Road (now Anzac Avenue) and South Street. Through the 1870s cemetery improvements included surveying, clearing and fencing new sections of the cemetery; forming, gravelling and turfing walks and paths; and planting trees and shrubs. No burials were made in the land fronting the Drayton Road. This area contained the sexton's residence and with ornamental trees planted, acquired a park-like appearance. A central entrance road was made through this new eastern section of the cemetery, from the Drayton Road to an earlier north-south access road off the Drayton Road that ran north past the original reserve to South Street. In 1882 a small parcel of land between the south-east corner of the burial ground and the Drayton Road was formerly incorporated into the cemetery reserve, creating a total area of nearly 67.75 acres (27.42 hectares). In 1905 the L-shaped road through the cemetery off South Street and the Drayton Road was officially closed and in March 1906 this also was incorporated into the cemetery reserve, which now encompassed just over 69.5 acres (28.1 hectares).

At least three sexton's cottages have been constructed on the reserve, but none survive. The first probably was erected in 1867, when the first sexton was appointed. This was re-built in 1869–1871. A third sexton's lodge was constructed in 1892, designed by the Toowoomba architectural firm of John Marks and Son. It was located in the north-east section of the cemetery reserve, just east of the South Street entrance, with a private drive off Drayton Road.

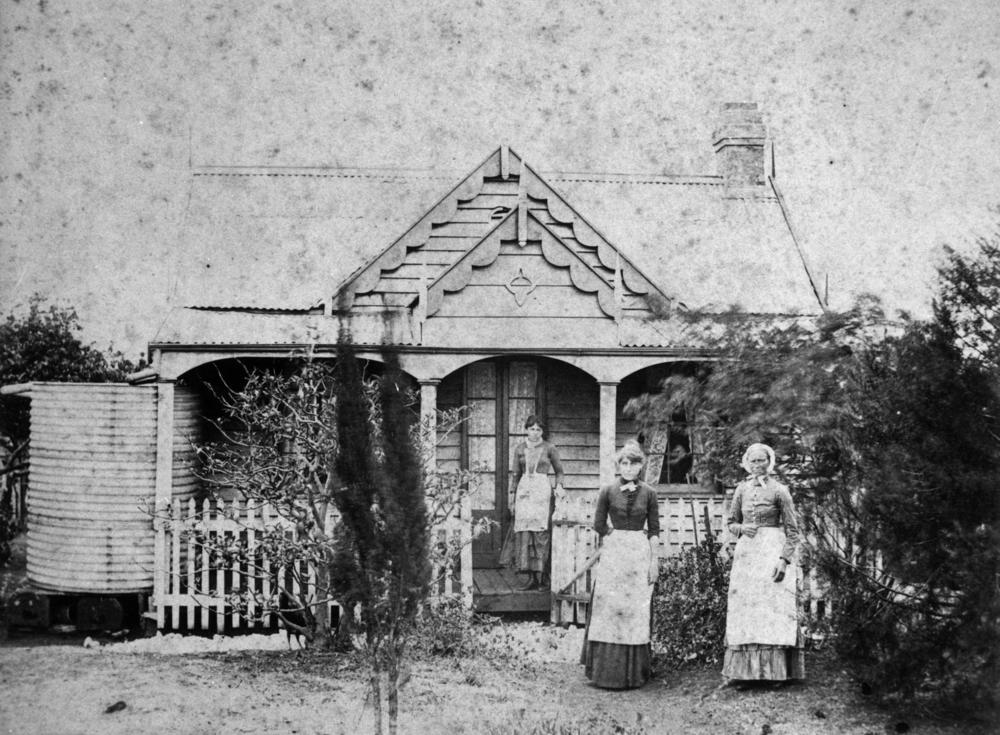
Sexton's residence (Devine family), ca. 1886

In March 1875 John Devine was appointed sexton, initiating 86 years of continuous service by three generations of the Devine family as sextons of the Drayton and Toowoomba Cemetery: John from 1875 to 1898; his son William John from 1898 to 1934; and William's son James Robert from 1934 to 1961. William and James planted most of the trees surviving in the cemetery grounds, including the avenue of trees along the entrance driveway from South Street. About 1930, William planted 14 Norfolk Island pine trees along the drive leading from Anzac Avenue west towards the sexton's residence, each tree representing one member of his family. Following James Devine's retirement the sexton's residence was removed, and in 1965 a lawn cemetery was established on the site.

In the interwar period (c. 1930) three timber-framed shelter sheds with terracotta-tiled roofs and lattice in-fill panels to the sides, were erected in the cemetery. A larger, earlier shelter shed has been removed from the site.

In the early 1950s a survey of the cemetery anticipated that the existing reserve would be fully occupied within 20 years, and in 1957 just over 31 acres (13 hectares) adjoining the western boundary of the cemetery was granted to the cemetery trustees. However, little of this has been utilised for burials, reflecting the rise in popularity of cremations in the late twentieth century. A private crematorium was opened in Toowoomba in 1966 and a columbarium established in the Drayton and Toowoomba Cemetery in the early 1990s.

About the mid-1950s part of the ground set aside in 1850 for "Jews" and "Pagans" was made into a cemetery for ex-military service personnel. An annual service is still held here on the Sunday before Anzac Day (25 April).

Toowoomba monumental masons have been associated with the design and construction of most of the headstones and other monuments in the cemetery since the 1850s. These include: Walter Bruce from 1871 to 1968 (by 1915 the firm was known as Bruce Brothers); Ernest S Hunt in the 1880s and 1890s; Henry Bailey in the 1890s; John H. Wagner from 1896 (this firm still operates as J. H. Wagner and Sons); and Rudolph C. Ziegler from c. 1912 (this business became R. C. Ziegler and Son in the 1920s and still operates). Other monumental masons who left their mark included: W. Colcombe, Swamp, 1854; Whitfield, Toowoomba, mid-1860s; and J. Cameron, Toowoomba, 1873.

The cemetery was neglected during the 1960s and by the 1970s the earlier graves were overgrown with grasses, weeds and trees, and many headstones and grave surrounds had been vandalised or allowed to deteriorate. In October 1974 administration of the cemetery passed to the Toowoomba City Council, which cleared the overgrowth and transformed the cemetery into a community asset. In 1987 an additional 12.62 hectares (31.2 acres) along the southern boundary of the cemetery was transferred to the Council for cemetery purposes, but has not been used.

By 2008 there were more than 45,000 burials in the Drayton and Toowoomba Cemetery. In addition to the original sections, designated areas for paupers, stillborn babies and Muslims have been established. All sections of the cemetery remain in use.

Many of Queensland's early and prominent citizens lie buried here, including: pastoralists William Kent of Jondaryan and William Beit of Westbrook; politicians such as Gilbert Eliott (first Speaker of the Queensland Parliament), James Taylor (member of the first Queensland parliament), and William Henry Groom (first mayor of Toowoomba and Queensland's first representative in the Commonwealth parliament); surveyor and explorer Francis Thomas Gregory; Brisbane's first Town Clerk, William Boyce; and notable personalities such as John Moffat of Irvinebank and George Essex Evans, the "Poet of Federation". Also buried in the cemetery are Thomas and Elizabeth Alford, who gave the names to both Drayton and Toowoomba.

The cemetery is also the final resting place of Darling Downs station workers who helped establish some of the earliest pastoral empires in Queensland – such as stockman John Hill, speared by Aborigines on Eton Vale Station in 1843, whose remains were transferred to the Drayton and Toowoomba Cemetery in 1909; of railway navvies who gave their lives constructing the Main Range Railway; of Aboriginal people, who between 1868 and 1911 were recorded simply as "Aboriginal" plus an English first name, as in "Aboriginal Billy"; of Chinese persons buried in the "pagan" section; and of persons executed at Toowoomba Gaol and buried without headstones. The early pattern of immigrant settlement in the Drayton-Toowoomba district is reflected in the numerous Scottish, English, Irish and German names found on the headstones.

== Description ==
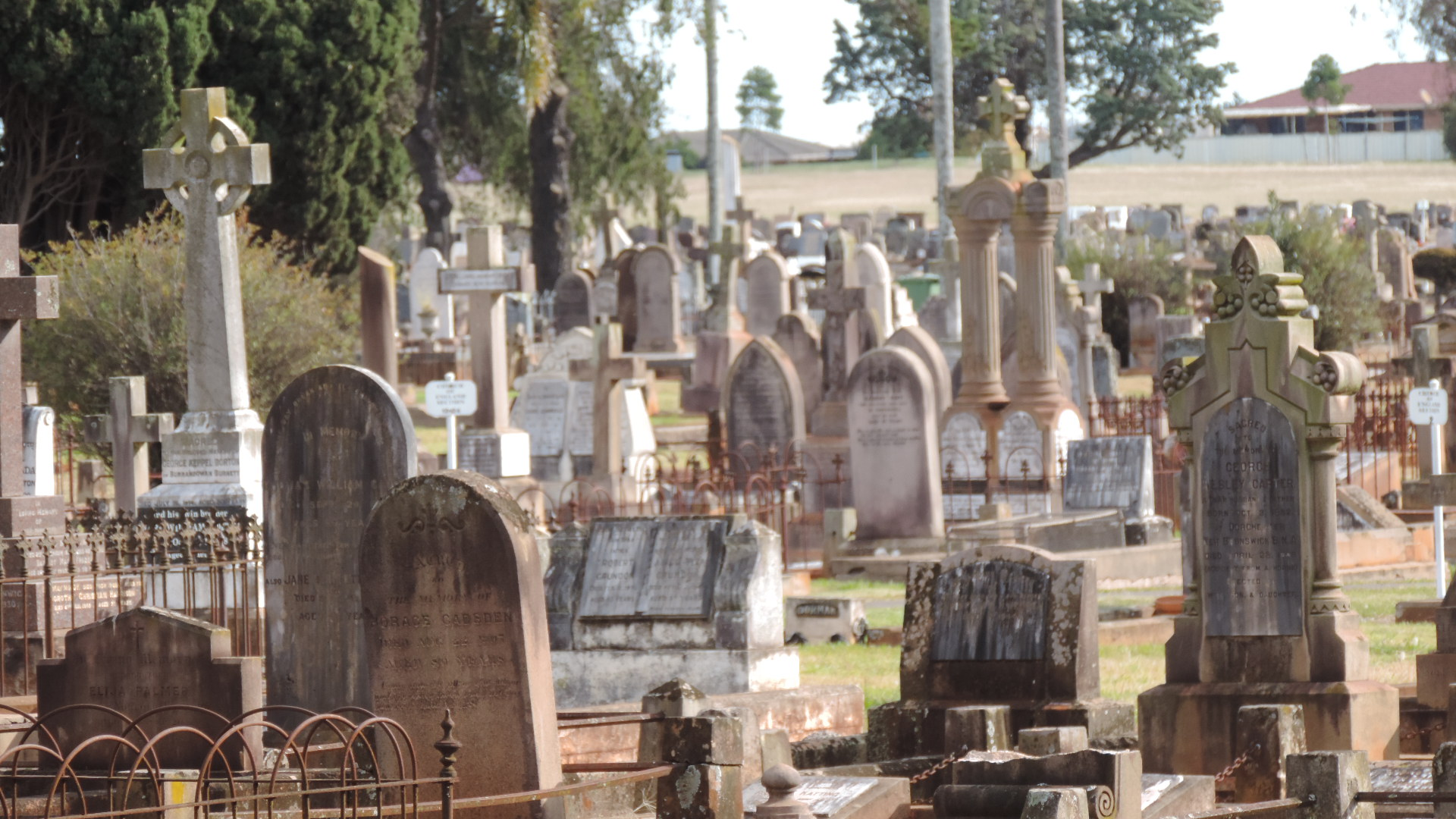
Headstones, 2015

The Drayton and Toowoomba Cemetery occupies a site of over 30 hectares (74 acres) situated north of Drayton and south-west of Toowoomba, at the intersection of Anzac Avenue and South Street, Harristown. The heritage boundary for the cemetery follows existing perimeter fencing that encloses the principal burial ground but excludes vacant cemetery land bounded by Karina Street to the west and Alderley Street to the south set aside in 1957 and 1987 for cemetery purposes. A water pumping station fronting Anzac Avenue, which sits on a small parcel of land excised in 1998 from the cemetery reserve, is not included within the heritage boundary.

=== Approaches and views ===
The main approach is from the direction of Toowoomba, heading south along Anzac Avenue. The north-eastern corner of the cemetery, at the intersection with South Street, has a curved brick wall with a modern metal sign (lettering: Drayton & Toowoomba Cemetery) with trees on either side, whilst an angle in the road along South Street directs the eye towards the ornamental gates of the main entrance. Now almost surrounded by predominantly industrial development, the cemetery stands out due to its green and park-like nature, with mature trees and shrubs screening it from the busy traffic along Anzac Avenue. From the less densely screened sides of the cemetery to the south and west, the gentle slopes covered in grave memorials and monuments are clearly visible, whilst the long straight avenues of trees provide a sense of the size and scale of the cemetery layout. From within the cemetery, the distant landscape of hills to the west provides a picturesque backdrop to the memorials.

=== Entrances and perimeter fencing ===
The principal access is via gates on South Street, opposite Hampton Street. The gates are set into an ornamental wall, constructed of brick with cement rendered ledges along the tops and decorative end posts. The metal gates are made of thin strips bolted together to make a pattern inside an outer frame. Two large gates in the middle are for vehicular access and have cattle grids, and the two smaller gates on either side are for use by pedestrians.

The only other entrance is off Anzac Avenue and is more subdued, with one large double gate flanked by thick timber posts and also possessing a cattle grid. The gates are of the same style and construction as those found at the South Street entrance.

Perimeter fencing along the northern and eastern boundaries consists mainly of low cyclone-wire and metal post fencing that is sometimes concealed by large Cotoneaster hedges. The rest of the cemetery is enclosed by barbed and netted wire fencing with metal posts. None of this fencing appears to be early.

=== Cemetery layout ===
The layout of the cemetery demonstrates a composite of styles reflecting changing attitudes towards memorialising the dead and managing burials since the mid-Victorian era. Expanding outwards from the early grid-like core (established 1850) to more informal lawn and memorial garden areas (from the 1960s), and set within a park-like setting established from the 1870s, this evolution of layout styles results in a variety of experiences for visitors. Most of the cemetery west of the main entrance drive is laid out in a formal grid arrangement with burial sections separated by walkways and driveways (avenues), some lined with mature trees on one or both sides. The main roadways running east-west are labelled 1st Avenue through to 6th Avenue, and burial sections consist of rectangular blocks of varying size. Each block has discrete modern signage at the eastern corners identifying denominational sections: Church of England (Anglican), Roman Catholic, Presbyterian, Methodist, Lutheran, and a number of smaller sections in the centre, including Salvation Army, Church of Christ, Seventh Day Adventist, Old Baptist and Congregationalist, Public, Infant, War Cemetery, Jewish, Other Protestant Religions and Muslim.

There are a number of lawn cemeteries established at the northern end of the site, either side of the main entrance drive. These contain both denominational and non-denominational sections. Within the north-eastern lawn cemetery is a Memorial Gardens and Memorial Lawn. The western lawn cemetery includes a Forest Lawn.

The cemetery office block, with nearby public toilets, is located on the eastern side of the main entrance drive, just north of the Anzac Avenue entrance. There is also a utility shed in this area. These are recent structures and are not of cultural heritage significance.

South of the Anzac Avenue entrance, occupying the eastern edge of the cemetery, is a park-like section that contains no burials or monuments. Many varieties of trees are planted here either in rows around the edges or randomly in the centre.

On the northern edge of the cemetery property facing South Street is a timber building that was moved onto the site in the early 2000s and currently houses the Family History Society. This building is not considered to be of cultural heritage significance for the purposes of the cemetery's Queensland Heritage Register listing.

=== Avenue trees and other plantings ===
The trees and plantings throughout the site are an important part of its design, due to their screening effect that assists in creating an atmosphere of peace and tranquillity within the cemetery grounds. The main entrance drive off South Street runs north-south and extends for approximately half the length of the cemetery, to 3rd Avenue. Along the entire length of this drive are equally spaced mature trees – alternating camphor laurels (Cinnamomum camphora) and London plane (Platanus × hispanica). The first half of this drive has a dual road carriage, separated by a grass island with a central row of mature queen palms (Arecastrum romanzoffianum). The second half of the drive has a row of queen palms along the western side.

Several other avenues of mature trees are located throughout the cemetery. South of the intersection with Third Avenue, the trees along the drive change to Cypress (type unknown), Italian Cypress (Cupressus sempervirens 'Stricta') and Cedar of Lebanon (Cedrus libani). The far southern boundary is defined by Queen and Jelly Palms (Butia capitata) to the east and Cypresses to the west. There are various trees planted along the western north-south roadway, including Italian Cypress. 1st Avenue has a magnificent row of large kauri (Agathis) to the east and some Italian Cypresses. The War Cemetery is encircled by rows of Cypress (type unknown) and large Pines (most likely Monterey Pines Pinus radiata). 4th Avenue possesses a variety of species along its length, whilst 5th Avenue is densely lined with Cedar of Lebanon, camphor laurel and Cypress. Other distinctive trees in the cemetery include a very large Eucalypt in block PRES5, and a mature Cook Island Pine in the middle of a family plot in the Old CE1.

The park-like section of trees along Anzac Avenue contains hoop pines (Araucaria cunninghamii), Cook Island Pines (Araucaria columnaris), Monterey Pines, Italian Cypress, Cypress (unidentified), a Canary Island date palm (Phoenix canariensis, south of the pump station), camphor laurels (an avenue from the entrance drive to the Anzac Avenue gate), Jacaranda (Jacaranda mimosifolia) and a single kauri (Agathis robusta).

In the eastern lawn cemetery there are various rows and avenues of camphor laurels, Cypress, Italian Cypress and Golden Cypress (Cupressus macrocarpa 'Brunniana Aurea'). Placed along the perimeter fencing are London plane trees and Cedar of Lebanon. A double row of hoop pines also exists south of the Memorial Lawn. The western lawn cemetery and Forest Lawn contains mostly gum trees (various species) and a row of Italian Cypresses that edges the eastern side of the Forest Lawn.

=== Graves, monuments and memorials ===
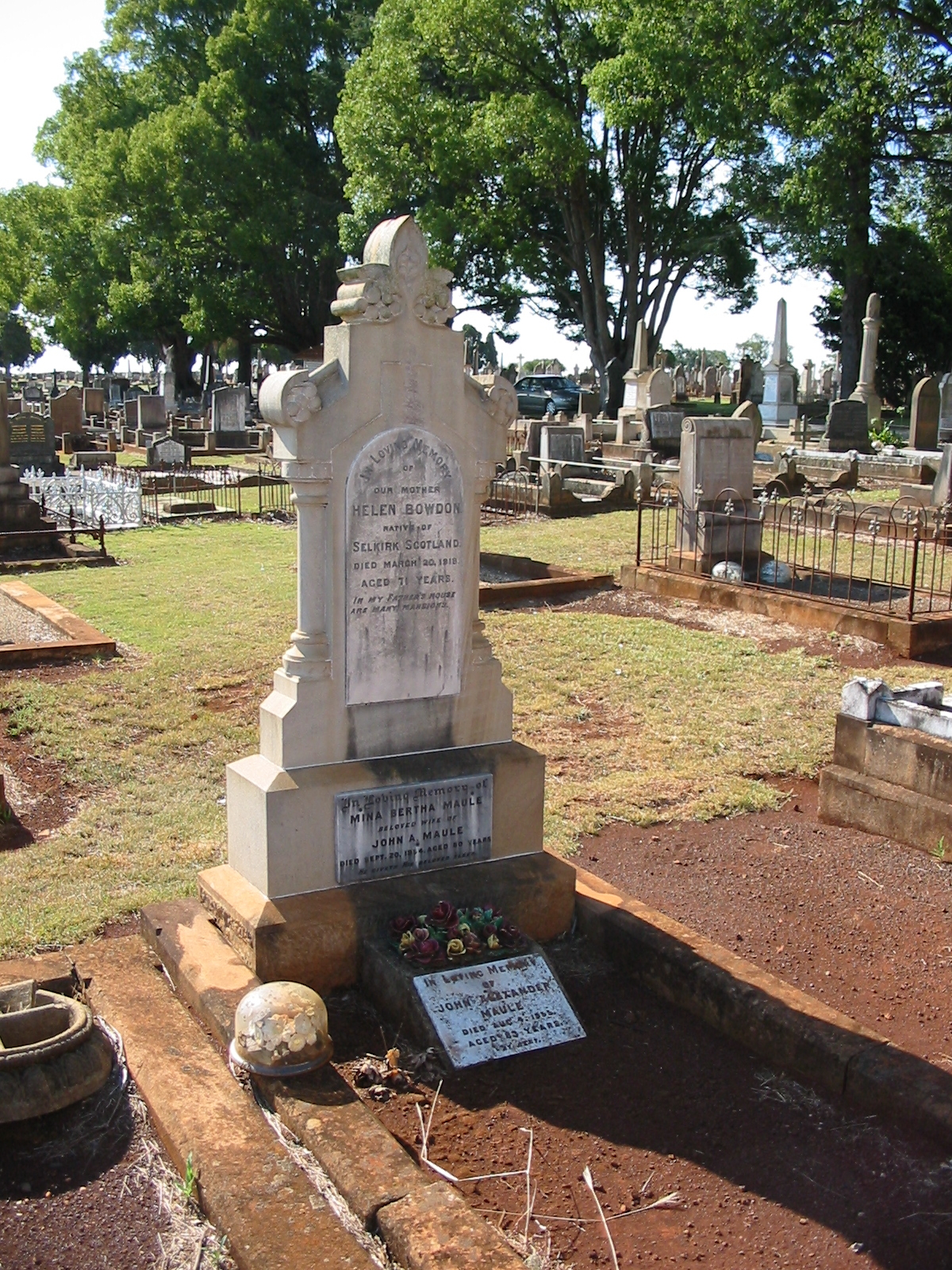
Sandstone headstone with marble plaques, Drayton and Toowoomba Cemetery, 2003

The many different styles of monuments and memorials found throughout the cemetery reflect the fashions of the eras in which they were created. Many of these are excellent examples of the design work and craft skills of monumental masons. The majority are constructed from sandstone or marble. Some have been affected by erosion from weather and staining from rust, dirt, mould or lichen. There are also many granite monuments, both modest and grand, that have less weathering. Combinations of two or more of these materials are a common occurrence (for example, a sandstone headstone with marble or granite plaque attached). Grave surrounds such as concrete curbing and/or slabs are commonly used throughout the cemetery, occasionally decorated with ceramic tiles or painted. Other materials used to surround or fill a grave include bricks, stones and gravel. Larger enclosures, such as the numerous family plots, are often delineated by low fences of cast or wrought iron, some of which are ornate. Others have low concrete posts with chains slung between them or connected by metal poles. Several have had trees planted within their enclosures which have grown over time, sometimes affecting the position of the monuments around them.

The more elaborate types of monuments found in the cemetery, particularly in the Victorian and Edwardian sections, demonstrate a variety of monumental forms including vaults, mausoleums, ledger stones, obelisks, tables, sarcophagi and altars. Some of the more distinctive are tempietto-style monuments and twin-column memorials. A vault and a mausoleum found in the south-east corner of the Old Roman Catholic section are particularly eye-catching. The 1937 vault, constructed of sandstone in a neo-classical style, is dedicated to the Coorey family and includes four marble statues of figures such as the Virgin Mary and a young boy. The early 1930s McColdrick family mausoleum houses a large and intricately carved angel statue in marble, surrounded by three stained glass window panels supported between sandstone columns.

A wide range of Victorian and Edwardian era memorial symbols are also on display throughout the cemetery, including Calvary crosses, Celtic crosses, draped urns, broken columns, broken chain, mourning angels and cherubs, carved garlands, flowers (passion flowers, roses, poppies), ivy, grapes, and clasped hands. Each of these has a particular symbolic meaning. Some ornamentation references the deceased's occupation, hobby or sporting interest – such as a diver's helmet, tools, weaver's apron, tennis racquets and balls, cricket bat and stumps, motor cycles, and a camera. There are also a variety of grave ornaments, including many immortelles and urns for holding flowers, and some graves are decorated with sea shells. Several graves and family plots have symbolic plantings, such as olive trees (Olea europaea) and cypresses.

Headstone inscriptions demonstrate a range of languages other than English, including Chinese, Hebrew and German, illustrating the early presence of non-British immigrant populations in the Drayton-Toowoomba district. Some inscriptions include interesting biographical information about the person's life or the circumstances that caused their death.

Monuments in the mid to late twentieth century sections tend to be more modest, with mainly upright slabs with concrete grave surrounds or slab and desk monuments. Two modern mausoleums and an elaborate arched granite monument housing marble statues can be found in RC9 and RC10. The War Cemetery section contains a seating area, flagpole, brick columbarium, lawn cemetery, and a gravelled area with simple, uniformly-designed marble headstones placed around two memorials.

Each grave in the lawn cemeteries is marked by a simple plaque set in a concrete block at ground level. The Memorial Lawn has rows of small headstones set into a single concrete footing. Both types of graves often have small pots and vases for flowers, set into the ground. The Memorial Gardens are for scattering or storing ashes and there is a brick columbarium, surrounded by garden beds planted with rose bushes, located in one corner. Other flowering bushes and small trees, often associated with particular graves, are found throughout the lawn cemeteries.

=== Cemetery structures ===
There are three shelter sheds (c. 1930) within the cemetery grounds. These are simple square timber structures made to the same design and all orientated with the doorway facing north. Each has a hipped roof of Marseilles tiles, sides in-filled with timber lattice, a dirt floor and two timber benches inside the northern corners. One is located in the northern part of the cemetery, on the north-east corner of block CE6. The shelter in the centre, at the south-east corner of the War Cemetery, is currently used to store iron grave markers which are stacked up against the southern wall. The southernmost shelter sits in the middle of cemetery block PRES3 on 5th Ave.

There are several timber posts within the cemetery grounds which may be remnants of earlier fences. Two are painted white with evidence of fixings (now removed) and decorative tops, one of which is located south of the main office, the other in the middle of the road along 5th Avenue.

== Heritage listing ==
Drayton and Toowoomba Cemetery was listed on the Queensland Heritage Register on 14 August 2009 having satisfied the following criteria.

The place is important in demonstrating the evolution or pattern of Queensland's history.

The Drayton and Toowoomba Cemetery, established in 1850, is one of the earliest surviving public cemeteries in the State and is important in demonstrating the pattern of Queensland's history. It is illustrative of the first phase of non-Indigenous settlement on the Darling Downs, and of the consolidation of Toowoomba as an important regional centre from the mid-nineteenth century. The cemetery provides important evidence of the social, demographic and cultural history of Toowoomba and district and is the burial place of individuals from all walks of life, including persons of importance in regional and Queensland history.

The place demonstrates rare, uncommon or endangered aspects of Queensland's cultural heritage.

In its extensive collection of memorials and monuments dating from the 1850s to the present the place provides a unique historical record that is an important aspect of Queensland's cultural heritage.

The place is important in demonstrating the principal characteristics of a particular class of cultural places.

The Drayton and Toowoomba Cemetery is important in demonstrating the principal characteristics of a large nineteenth-century public cemetery that has evolved over time to reflect changing community attitudes to providing for the dead. It retains its nineteenth-century extent and grid pattern of denominational sections, walkways and drives; memorials from the 1850s to the present; substantial tree plantings; and early twentieth-century shelter sheds. The progressive layering, development and diversity of styles of memorialisation contained within this extensive cemetery, including the establishment of lawn cemeteries and memorial gardens in the late twentieth century, document changing attitudes to death and fashions in funerary ornamentation since the 1850s.

The place is important because of its aesthetic significance.

The place has strong aesthetic value generated by: the extent, quality of workmanship and harmony of materials of the memorials; the patina of age to the earlier headstones; the formal grid layout of the earlier sections of the cemetery; the impressive avenues of tall trees and other plantings that frame and enclose discrete spaces and focus views both within and outside the cemetery; the picturesque memorial gardens and lawn cemeteries; the modest timber and terracotta-roofed shelter sheds; the ornamental trees along the Anzac Avenue frontage; and the picturesque backdrop of low ranges to the west. The whole creates an atmosphere conducive to repose and reflection that was, and remains, an essential part of the ritual of honouring and remembering the dead.

The place is important in demonstrating a high degree of creative or technical achievement at a particular period.

Many of the monuments display a high level of creative achievement and are important for their excellence of design and craftsmanship, and emotive impact. The 1937 Coorey family vault, the 1930s McColdrick family mausoleum, the numerous twin columns distinctive of the work of monumental mason Walter Bruce and later copied by others, and the c. 1904 tempietto-style Sheedy monument designed by Toowoomba architects Marks and Son and executed by monumental mason JH Wagner, are outstanding examples of funerary art and architecture.

The place has a strong or special association with a particular community or cultural group for social, cultural or spiritual reasons.

As the Toowoomba district's earliest and foremost public cemetery, the Drayton and Toowoomba Cemetery has been an important focus of public ritual and sentiment since the 1850s.

== Notable burials ==
- William Joseph Brennan, Roman Catholic Bishop of Toowoomba
- Leslie Arnold Wood, Labor leader of the Queensland Opposition 1957–1958
- John Edmund "Jack" Duggan, Deputy Premier of Queensland 1953–1957 & Labor leader of the Queensland Opposition 1958–1966
- Andy Hunter (footballer, born 1864), Early Aston Villa F.C. player, famously scoring Aston Villa's first ever goal in the FA Cup
