= Electoral results for the district of Bowen =

Queensland, Australia, district election results

This is a list of electoral results for the electoral district of Bowen in Queensland state elections in Australia.

== Members for Bowen ==
First incarnation (1873–1950)
Member	Party	Term
Thomas Henry FitzGerald		1873–1875
Francis Amhurst		1875–1877
Henry Beor	Conservative	1877–1880
Pope Alexander Cooper	Conservative	1881–1883
Charles Chubb	Conservative	1883–1888
Robert Smith	Conservative	1888–1890
Robert Smith	Ministerial	1890–1902
Francis Kenna	Labor	1902–1907
Francis Kenna	Kidstonites	1907–1909
Myles Ferricks	Labor	1909–1912
Edward Caine	Liberal	1912–1915
Charles Collins	Labor	1915–1936
Ernest Riordan	Labor	1936–1944
Fred Paterson	Communist	1944–1950
Second incarnation (1960–1971)
Peter Delamothe	Liberal	1960–1971
Third incarnation (1986–1992)
Ken Smyth	Labor	1986–1992

== Election results ==
=== Elections in the 1980s ===
Results for the 1989 election were:

1989 Queensland state election: Bowen
Party	Candidate	Votes	%	±%
Labor	Ken Smyth	7,386	68.1	+11.1
National	Trevor Maltby	2,598	23.9	−2.4
Independent	Josephine Cronin	869	8.0	+8.0
Total formal votes		10,853	97.6	−0.7
Informal votes		262	2.4	+0.7
Turnout		11,115	90.1	−1.9
Two-party-preferred result
Labor	Ken Smyth		70.6	+8.9
National	Trevor Maltby		29.4	−8.9
Labor hold		Swing	+8.9	

1986 Queensland state election: Bowen
Party	Candidate	Votes	%	±%
Labor	Ken Smyth	6,274	57.0	
National	Jim Turner	2,892	26.3	
Liberal	Jeanette Hunter	1,836	16.7	
Total formal votes		11,002	98.3	
Informal votes		195	1.7	
Turnout		11,197	92.0	
Two-party-preferred result
Labor	Ken Smyth	6,869	62.5	+4.9
National	Jim Turner	4,127	37.5	−4.9
Labor hold		Swing	+4.9	

=== Elections in the 1960s ===
1969 Queensland state election: Bowen
Party	Candidate	Votes	%	±%
Liberal	Peter Delamothe	3,814	51.4	+0.2
Labor	Leonard Bidgood	3,599	48.6	+5.2
Total formal votes		7,413	98.6	−0.1
Informal votes		105	1.4	+0.1
Turnout		7,518	93.9	−1.5
Liberal hold		Swing	−4.1	

1966 Queensland state election: Bowen
Party	Candidate	Votes	%	±%
Liberal	Peter Delamothe	3,632	51.2	+4.7
Labor	John Gralton	3,080	43.4	−3.4
Queensland Labor	James McCane	382	5.4	−1.3
Total formal votes		7,094	98.7	+0.4
Informal votes		93	1.3	−0.4
Turnout		7,187	95.4	0.0
Two-party-preferred result
Liberal	Peter Delamothe	3,943	55.6	+3.7
Labor	John Gralton	3,151	44.4	−3.7
Liberal hold		Swing	+3.7	

1963 Queensland state election: Bowen
Party	Candidate	Votes	%	±%
Labor	John Gralton	3,252	46.8	+7.4
Liberal	Peter Delamothe	3,230	46.5	+0.4
Queensland Labor	Jim McCane	462	6.7	−2.8
Total formal votes		6,944	98.3	−0.1
Informal votes		120	1.7	+0.1
Turnout		7,064	95.4	+1.3
Two-party-preferred result
Liberal	Peter Delamothe	3,607	51.9	
Labor	John Gralton	3,337	48.1	
Liberal hold		Swing	N/A	

1960 Queensland state election: Bowen
Party	Candidate	Votes	%	±%
Liberal	Peter Delamothe	3,287	46.0	
Labor	William Klaka	2,813	39.4	
Queensland Labor	James Berryman	679	9.5	
Communist	James Nisbet	358	5.0	
Total formal votes		7,137	98.4	
Informal votes		115	1.6	
Turnout		7,252	94.1	
Liberal win		(new seat)		

=== Elections in the 1940s ===
1947 Queensland state election: Bowen
Party	Candidate	Votes	%	±%
Communist	Fred Paterson	3,331	39.3	−5.1
Labor	John Barry	2,584	30.5	−8.1
Country	George McLean	2,551	30.1	+13.2
Total formal votes		8,466	99.3	+0.3
Informal votes		57	0.7	−0.3
Turnout		8,523	93.8	+6.1
Communist hold		Swing	+2.8	

1944 Queensland state election: Bowen
Party	Candidate	Votes	%	±%
Communist	Fred Paterson	3,434	44.4	−2.9
Labor	Ernest Riordan	2,988	38.6	−14.1
Country	Bill Hancock	1,310	16.9	+16.9
Total formal votes		7,732	99.0	+2.4
Informal votes		80	1.0	−2.4
Turnout		7,812	87.7	−3.3
Communist gain from Labor		Swing	+6.2	

1941 Queensland state election: Bowen
Party	Candidate	Votes	%	±%
Labor	Ernest Riordan	4,152	52.7	+13.5
Communist	Fred Paterson	3,733	47.3	+18.0
Total formal votes		7,885	96.6	−2.6
Informal votes		275	3.4	+2.6
Turnout		8,160	91.0	−3.6
Labor hold		Swing	−4.5	

=== Elections in the 1930s ===
1938 Queensland state election: Bowen
Party	Candidate	Votes	%	±%
Labor	Ernest Riordan	3,098	39.2	−13.4
Communist	Fred Paterson	2,319	29.3	+13.7
Country	Ernest Forde	2,135	27.0	−2.4
Social Credit	Henry Beck	355	4.5	+4.5
Total formal votes		7,907	99.2	+0.7
Informal votes		62	0.8	−0.7
Turnout		7,969	94.6	+0.7
Two-candidate-preferred result
Labor	Ernest Riordan	3,308	56.2	
Communist	Fred Paterson	2,579	43.8	
Labor hold		Swing	N/A	

1935 Queensland state election: Bowen
Party	Candidate	Votes	%	±%
Labor	Charles Collins	3,943	52.6	
CPNP	Arthur Bradford	2,205	29.4	
Communist	Fred Paterson	1,173	15.6	
Independent	George Kent	181	2.4	
Total formal votes		7,502	98.5	
Informal votes		113	1.5	
Turnout		7,615	93.9	
Labor hold		Swing		

1932 Queensland state election: Bowen
Party	Candidate	Votes	%	±%
Labor	Charles Collins	3,926	57.1	
CPNP	Thomas Mann	2,948	42.9	
Total formal votes		6,874	98.9	
Informal votes		78	1.1	
Turnout		6,952	94.8	
Labor hold		Swing		

=== Elections in the 1920s ===
1929 Queensland state election: Bowen
Party	Candidate	Votes	%	±%
Labor	Charles Collins	3,105	51.6	−6.0
CPNP	Thomas Mann	2,916	48.4	+6.0
Total formal votes		6,021	98.1	−0.8
Informal votes		118	1.9	+0.8
Turnout		6,139	90.5	+0.7
Labor hold		Swing	−6.0	

1926 Queensland state election: Bowen
Party	Candidate	Votes	%	±%
Labor	Charles Collins	3,273	57.6	−5.4
CPNP	Frederick Woods	2,410	42.4	+5.4
Total formal votes		5,683	98.9	−0.3
Informal votes		65	1.1	+0.3
Turnout		5,748	89.8	+12.5
Labor hold		Swing	−5.4	

1923 Queensland state election: Bowen
Party	Candidate	Votes	%	±%
Labor	Charles Collins	3,069	63.0	
United	Frank Ferguson	1,800	37.0	
Total formal votes		4,869	99.2	
Informal votes		40	0.8	
Turnout		4,909	77.3	
Labor hold		Swing	N/A	

1920 Queensland state election: Bowen
Party	Candidate	Votes	%	±%
Labor	Charles Collins	3,576	63.8	+4.4
Northern Country	John Leahy	2,032	36.2	+36.2
Total formal votes		5,608	98.9	−0.1
Informal votes		62	1.1	+0.1
Turnout		5,670		
Labor hold		Swing	+4.4	

=== Elections in the 1910s ===
1918 Queensland state election: Bowen
Party	Candidate	Votes	%	±%
Labor	Charles Collins	3,046	59.4	+1.9
National	John Mann	2,080	40.6	−1.9
Total formal votes		5,126	99.0	+1.3
Informal votes		53	1.0	−1.3
Turnout		5,179	77.3	−2.5
Labor hold		Swing	+1.9	

1915 Queensland state election: Bowen
Party	Candidate	Votes	%	±%
Labor	Charles Collins	2,416	57.5	+12.6
Liberal	Edwin Caine	1,787	42.5	−12.6
Total formal votes		4,203	97.7	−1.1
Informal votes		100	2.3	+1.1
Turnout		4,303	79.8	+3.4
Labor gain from Liberal		Swing	+12.6	

1912 Queensland state election: Bowen
Party	Candidate	Votes	%	±%
Liberal	Edwin Caine	1,868	55.1	
Labor	Myles Ferricks	1,519	44.9	
Total formal votes		3,387	98.8	
Total formal votes		42	1.2	
Turnout		3,429	76.4	
Liberal gain from Labor		Swing		
