= Results of the 1935 Queensland state election =

Queensland state election, 11 May 1935 Legislative Assembly << 1932–1938 >>
Enrolled voters	507,760^{[1]}				
Votes cast	470,691		Turnout	92.70%	–0.12%
Informal votes	8,186		Informal	1.74%	+0.61%
Summary of votes by party
Party	Primary votes	%	Swing	Seats	Change
Labor	247,135	53.43%	+3.55%	46	+13
CPNP	204,158	33.80%	–11.41%	16	–12
Social Credit	32,447	7.02%	+7.02%	0	± 0
Communist	6,101	1.32%	+1.09%	0	± 0
Women's Political Alliance	2,898	0.63%	+0.63%	0	± 0
Ind. Labor	1,918	0.42%	+0.01%	0	± 0
Independent	15,681	3.39%	+0.94%	0	– 1
Total	510,338			62	

This is a list of electoral district results for the 1935 Queensland state election.

At the time, the voting system in Queensland was based on contingency voting, which was similar to the modern optional preferential voting system. In electorates with 3 or more candidates, preferences were not distributed if a candidate received more than 50% of the primary vote.

If none received more than 50%, all except the top two candidates were eliminated from the count and their preferences distributed between the two leaders, with the one receiving the most votes declared the winner.

== Results by electoral district ==
=== Albert ===
1935 Queensland state election: Albert
Party	Candidate	Votes	%	±%
CPNP	Tom Plunkett	4,452	53.5	
Social Credit	George Gray	3,875	46.5	
Total formal votes		8,327	97.1	
Informal votes		245	2.9	
Turnout		8,572	91.4	
CPNP hold		Swing		

=== Aubigny ===
1935 Queensland state election: Aubigny
Party	Candidate	Votes	%	±%
CPNP	Arthur Moore	unopposed		
CPNP hold		Swing		

=== Barcoo ===
1935 Queensland state election: Barcoo
Party	Candidate	Votes	%	±%
Labor	Frank Bulcock	unopposed		
Labor hold		Swing		

=== Baroona ===
1935 Queensland state election: Baroona
Party	Candidate	Votes	%	±%
Labor	Bill Power	5,835	69.2	
Social Credit	Julius Streeter	2,600	30.8	
Total formal votes		8,435	96.3	
Informal votes		320	3.7	
Turnout		8,755	89.7	
Labor hold		Swing		

=== Bowen ===
1935 Queensland state election: Bowen
Party	Candidate	Votes	%	±%
Labor	Charles Collins	3,943	52.6	
CPNP	Arthur Bradford	2,205	29.4	
Communist	Fred Paterson	1,173	15.6	
Independent	George Kent	181	2.4	
Total formal votes		7,502	98.5	
Informal votes		113	1.5	
Turnout		7,615	93.9	
Labor hold		Swing		

==== By-elections ====
- This by-election was caused by the death of Charles Collins. It was held on 20 June 1936.

1936 Bowen state by-election
Party	Candidate	Votes	%	±%
Labor	Ernest Riordan	2,623	36.2	−16.4
Country	John Smith	2,294	31.7	+2.3
Communist	Fred Paterson	1,755	24.3	+8.7
Social Credit	Henry Madden	449	6.2	+6.2
Independent	William Morgan	116	1.6	+1.6
Total formal votes		7,237	99.2	+0.7
Informal votes		62	0.8	−0.7
Turnout		7,299	87.8	−6.1
Two-party-preferred result
Labor	Ernest Riordan	3,592	59.2	
Country	John Smith	2,472	40.8	
Labor hold		Swing	N/A	

=== Bremer ===
1935 Queensland state election: Bremer
Party	Candidate	Votes	%	±%
Labor	Frank Cooper	7,166	87.5	
Communist	Geordie Burns	1,026	12.5	
Total formal votes		8,192	97.4	
Informal votes		220	2.6	
Turnout		8,412	94.6	
Labor hold		Swing		

=== Brisbane ===
1935 Queensland state election: Brisbane
Party	Candidate	Votes	%	±%
Labor	Robert Funnell	5,500	64.4	
Independent Labor	Henry Shea	1,918	22.5	
Social Credit	Charles Martin	1,118	13.1	
Total formal votes		8,536	97.2	
Informal votes		244	2.8	
Turnout		8,780	84.3	
Labor hold		Swing		

- Preferences were not distributed.

==== By-election ====
- This by-election was caused by the death of Robert Funnell. It was held on 4 April 1936.

1936 Brisbane state by-election
Party	Candidate	Votes	%	±%
Labor	Johnno Mann	4,726	65.5	+1.1
Independent	Edwyn Roper	1,720	23.8	+23.8
Social Credit	Charles Martin	770	10.7	−2.4
Total formal votes		7,216	98.5	+1.3
Informal votes		113	1.5	−1.3
Turnout		7,329	74.2	−10.1
Labor hold		Swing	N/A	

=== Bulimba ===
1935 Queensland state election: Bulimba
Party	Candidate	Votes	%	±%
Labor	William Copley	6,013	66.8	
CPNP	Clive Lambourne	2,445	27.1	
Communist	Donald Parker	546	6.1	
Total formal votes		9,004	98.4	
Informal votes		149	1.6	
Turnout		9,153	95.0	
Labor hold		Swing		

- Preferences were not distributed.

=== Bundaberg ===
1935 Queensland state election: Bundaberg
Party	Candidate	Votes	%	±%
Labor	Bernard McLean	4,738	52.4	
Social Credit	Henry Clegton	3,029	33.5	
CPNP	Edward Redmond	1,279	14.1	
Total formal votes		9,046	99.3	
Informal votes		62	0.7	
Turnout		9,108	96.7	
Labor hold		Swing		

- Preferences were not distributed.

=== Buranda ===
1935 Queensland state election: Buranda
Party	Candidate	Votes	%	±%
Labor	Ted Hanson	6,139	64.2	
CPNP	Charles Edwards	2,570	26.9	
Social Credit	John Read	860	9.0	
Total formal votes		9,569	98.7	
Informal votes		126	1.3	
Turnout		9,695	93.3	
Labor hold		Swing		

- Preferences were not distributed.

=== Cairns ===
1935 Queensland state election: Cairns
Party	Candidate	Votes	%	±%
Labor	John O'Keefe	5,285	69.3	
Social Credit	John Clayton	1,910	25.1	
Independent Communist	Alan Tucker	429	5.6	
Total formal votes		7,624	98.1	
Informal votes		147	1.9	
Turnout		7,771	90.2	
Labor hold		Swing		

- Preferences were not distributed.

=== Carnarvon ===
1935 Queensland state election: Carnarvon
Party	Candidate	Votes	%	±%
Labor	Paul Hilton	4,157	52.8	
CPNP	Edward Costello	3,110	39.5	
Social Credit	Ernest Hall	605	7.7	
Total formal votes		7,872	99.2	
Informal votes		62	0.8	
Turnout		7,934	91.9	
Labor gain from CPNP		Swing		

- Preferences were not distributed.

=== Carpentaria ===
1935 Queensland state election: Carpentaria
Party	Candidate	Votes	%	±%
Labor	John Mullan	unopposed		
Labor hold		Swing		

=== Charters Towers ===
1935 Queensland state election: Charters Towers
Party	Candidate	Votes	%	±%
Labor	William Wellington	4,443	64.5	
Independent	Frederick Thornleigh	2,020	29.3	
Independent	Alexander Hunter	425	6.2	
Total formal votes		6,888	99.0	
Informal votes		70	1.0	
Turnout		6,958	90.7	
Labor hold		Swing		

- Preferences were not distributed.

=== Cook ===
1935 Queensland state election: Cook
Party	Candidate	Votes	%	±%
Labor	Harold Collins	4,051	53.7	
CPNP	Ernest Atherton	1,965	26.0	
Social Credit	Richard Boorman	1,528	20.3	
Total formal votes		7,544	98.4	
Informal votes		122	1.6	
Turnout		7,666	90.7	
Labor gain from CPNP		Swing		

- Preferences were not distributed.

=== Cooroora ===
1935 Queensland state election: Cooroora
Party	Candidate	Votes	%	±%
CPNP	Harry Walker	5,700	66.6	
Women's Political Alliance	Nora Solly	2,898	33.4	
Total formal votes		8,688	98.1	
Informal votes		165	1.9	
Turnout		8,853	93.7	
CPNP hold		Swing		

=== Cunningham ===
1935 Queensland state election: Cunningham
Party	Candidate	Votes	%	±%
CPNP	William Deacon	unopposed		
CPNP hold		Swing		

=== Dalby ===
1935 Queensland state election: Dalby
Party	Candidate	Votes	%	±%
CPNP	Godfrey Morgan	4,373	51.8	
Labor	George Wilkes	4,061	48.2	
Total formal votes		8,434	99.0	
Informal votes		84	1.0	
Turnout		8,518	93.1	
CPNP hold		Swing		

=== East Toowoomba ===
1935 Queensland state election: East Toowoomba
Party	Candidate	Votes	%	±%
Labor	James Kane	4,400	54.4	
CPNP	James Annand	3,696	45.6	
Total formal votes		8,096	98.5	
Informal votes		123	1.5	
Turnout		8,219	92.5	
Labor gain from CPNP		Swing		

=== Enoggera ===
1935 Queensland state election: Enoggera
Party	Candidate	Votes	%	±%
Labor	George Taylor	6,383	69.0	
CPNP	Richard Hill	2,862	31.0	
Total formal votes		9,245	98.4	
Informal votes		151	1.6	
Turnout		9,396	93.9	
Labor hold		Swing		

=== Fassifern ===
1935 Queensland state election: Fassifern
Party	Candidate	Votes	%	±%
CPNP	Alf Muller	5,515	62.1	
Labor	James Ryan	3,368	37.9	
Total formal votes		8,883	98.9	
Informal votes		100	1.1	
Turnout		8,983	94.4	
CPNP hold		Swing		

=== Fitzroy ===
1935 Queensland state election: Fitzroy
Party	Candidate	Votes	%	±%
Labor	Jim Clark	5,587	63.3	
CPNP	Albert Pearson	3,233	36.7	
Total formal votes		8,820	98.5	
Informal votes		133	1.5	
Turnout		8,953	94.3	
Labor gain from CPNP		Swing		

=== Fortitude Valley ===
1935 Queensland state election: Fortitude Valley
Party	Candidate	Votes	%	±%
Labor	Samuel Brassington	6,481	72.3	
CPNP	Nicholas Lockyer	2,248	25.1	
Communist	Mick Ryan	230	2.6	
Total formal votes		8,959	98.9	
Informal votes		101	1.1	
Turnout		9,060	93.1	
Labor hold		Swing	N/A	

=== Gregory ===
1935 Queensland state election: Gregory
Party	Candidate	Votes	%	±%
Labor	George Pollock	unopposed		
Labor hold		Swing		

=== Gympie ===
1935 Queensland state election: Gympie
Party	Candidate	Votes	%	±%
Labor	Thomas Dunstan	4,105	56.7	
CPNP	Vivian Tozer	3,138	43.3	
Total formal votes		7,243	99.1	
Informal votes		68	0.9	
Turnout		7,311	94.2	
Labor gain from CPNP		Swing		

=== Hamilton ===
1935 Queensland state election: Hamilton
Party	Candidate	Votes	%	±%
CPNP	Hugh Russell	5,647	65.8	
Labor	John Moir	2,936	34.2	
Total formal votes		8,583	98.5	
Informal votes		134	1.5	
Turnout		8,717	90.0	
CPNP hold		Swing		

=== Herbert ===
1935 Queensland state election: Herbert
Party	Candidate	Votes	%	±%
Labor	Percy Pease	5,590	63.7	
Independent	Roy Sherrington	1,661	18.9	
Communist	Jack Henry	1,520	17.3	
Total formal votes		8,771	98.2	
Informal votes		158	1.8	
Turnout		8,929	88.1	
Labor hold		Swing		

- Preferences were not distributed.

=== Ipswich ===
1935 Queensland state election: Ipswich
Party	Candidate	Votes	%	±%
Labor	David Gledson	unopposed		
Labor hold		Swing		

=== Isis ===
1935 Queensland state election: Isis
Party	Candidate	Votes	%	±%
CPNP	William Brand	4,817	58.1	
Labor	Dudley Ryder	3,472	41.9	
Total formal votes		8,289	98.5	
Informal votes		123	1.5	
Turnout		8,412	95.0	
CPNP hold		Swing		

=== Ithaca ===
1935 Queensland state election: Ithaca
Party	Candidate	Votes	%	±%
Labor	Ned Hanlon	unopposed		
Labor hold		Swing		

=== Kelvin Grove ===
1935 Queensland state election: Kelvin Grove
Party	Candidate	Votes	%	±%
Labor	Frank Waters	6,417	69.7	
CPNP	Benjamin White	2,784	30.3	
Total formal votes		9,201	98.4	
Informal votes		151	1.6	
Turnout		9,352	93.8	
Labor hold		Swing		

=== Kennedy ===
1935 Queensland state election: Kennedy
Party	Candidate	Votes	%	±%
Labor	Cecil Jesson	5,160	63.9	
CPNP	John Jackson	2,920	36.1	
Total formal votes		8,080	96.8	
Informal votes		267	3.2	
Turnout		8,347	91.5	
Labor gain from CPNP		Swing		

=== Keppel ===
1935 Queensland state election: Keppel
Party	Candidate	Votes	%	±%
CPNP	Owen Daniel	3,913	49.4	
Labor	Albert Pascoe	2,622	33.1	
Social Credit	John Harding	1,392	17.6	
Total formal votes		7,927	98.8	
Informal votes		95	1.2	
Turnout		8,022	95.3	
Two-party-preferred result
CPNP	Owen Daniel	4,195	59.0	
Labor	Albert Pascoe	2,918	41.0	
CPNP hold		Swing		

==== By-election ====
- This by-election was caused by the death of Owen Daniel. It was contested and won by his son, David Daniel. It was held on 4 April 1936.

1936 Keppel state by-election
Party	Candidate	Votes	%	±%
CPNP	David Daniel	3,495	44.8	−4.6
Labor	Albert Pascoe	2,417	31.0	−2.9
Social Credit	John Harding	1,897	24.3	+6.7
Total formal votes		7,809	98.3	−0.5
Informal votes		135	1.7	+0.5
Turnout		7,944	89.5	−5.8
Two-party-preferred result
CPNP	David Daniel	3,525	58.7	−0.3
Labor	Albert Pascoe	2,477	41.3	+0.3
CPNP hold		Swing	−0.3	

=== Kurilpa ===
1935 Queensland state election: Kurilpa
Party	Candidate	Votes	%	±%
Labor	Kerry Copley	5,831	63.9	
CPNP	Frederick Cross	2,848	31.2	
Independent	Charles Drew	452	4.9	
Total formal votes		9,131	98.3	
Informal votes		155	1.7	
Turnout		9,286	91.9	
Labor hold		Swing		

- Preferences were not distributed.

=== Logan ===
1935 Queensland state election: Logan
Party	Candidate	Votes	%	±%
Labor	John Brown	5,640	61.0	
CPNP	Reginald King	3,601	39.0	
Total formal votes		9,241	98.1	
Informal votes		183	1.9	
Turnout		9,424	94.4	
Labor gain from CPNP		Swing		

=== Mackay ===
1935 Queensland state election: Mackay
Party	Candidate	Votes	%	±%
Labor	William Forgan Smith	6,144	71.6	
CPNP	William Ferguson	1,826	21.3	
Social Credit	Arthur Williams	614	7.1	
Total formal votes		8,579	98.7	
Informal votes		114	1.3	
Turnout		8,698	89.7	
Labor hold		Swing		

- Preferences were not distributed.

=== Maranoa ===
1935 Queensland state election: Maranoa
Party	Candidate	Votes	%	±%
Labor	Charles Conroy	5,148	70.5	
Social Credit	Herman Brus	2,158	29.5	
Total formal votes		7,306	97.3	
Informal votes		205	2.7	
Turnout		7,511	86.3	
Labor hold		Swing		

=== Maree ===
1935 Queensland state election: Maree
Party	Candidate	Votes	%	±%
Labor	William King	6,400	69.9	
CPNP	David Miller	2,763	30.1	
Total formal votes		9,163	97.3	
Informal votes		253	2.7	
Turnout		9,416	93.8	
Labor hold		Swing		

=== Maryborough ===
1935 Queensland state election: Maryborough
Party	Candidate	Votes	%	±%
Labor	James Stopford	7,644	90.4	
Communist	Harold McElligott	811	9.6	
Total formal votes		8,455	97.5	
Informal votes		219	2.5	
Turnout		8,674	95.3	
Labor hold		Swing		

==== By-election ====
- This by-election was caused by the death of James Stopford. It was held on 27 February 1937.

1937 Maryborough state by-election
Party	Candidate	Votes	%	±%
Labor	William Demaine	5,743	71.8	−18.6
Social Credit	Noel Bromiley	1,563	19.5	+19.5
Communist	Harold McElligott	692	8.7	−0.9
Total formal votes		7,998		
Informal votes				
Turnout				
Labor hold		Swing	N/A	

=== Merthyr ===
1935 Queensland state election: Merthyr
Party	Candidate	Votes	%	±%
Labor	James Keogh	6,035	66.5	
CPNP	William Stevens	3,046	33.5	
Total formal votes		9,081	98.3	
Informal votes		155	1.7	
Turnout		9,236	91.5	
Labor hold		Swing		

=== Mirani ===
1935 Queensland state election: Mirani
Party	Candidate	Votes	%	±%
Labor	Ted Walsh	4,161	48.9	
CPNP	Arthur Fadden	3,951	46.5	
Social Credit	Philip Kirwan	392	4.6	
Total formal votes		8,504	99.1	
Informal votes		77	0.9	
Turnout		8,581	92.9	
Two-party-preferred result
Labor	Ted Walsh	4,216	51.4	
CPNP	Arthur Fadden	3,992	48.6	
Labor gain from CPNP		Swing		

=== Mundingburra ===
1935 Queensland state election: Mundingburra
Party	Candidate	Votes	%	±%
Labor	John Dash	6,054	67.4	
CPNP	Francis Hughes	2,210	24.6	
Communist	Albert Robinson	720	8.0	
Total formal votes		8,984	98.4	
Informal votes		148	1.6	
Turnout		9,132	94.8	
Labor hold		Swing		

- Preferences were not distributed.

=== Murrumba ===
1935 Queensland state election: Murrumba
Party	Candidate	Votes	%	±%
CPNP	Frank Nicklin	5,373	63.8	
Independent	Alfred Langdon	3,049	36.2	
Total formal votes		8,422	97.2	
Informal votes		238	2.8	
Turnout		8,660	94.7	
CPNP hold		Swing		

=== Nanango ===
1935 Queensland state election: Nanango
Party	Candidate	Votes	%	±%
CPNP	Jim Edwards	5,168	63.7	
Independent	Andrew Knox	2,948	36.3	
Total formal votes		8,116	97.9	
Informal votes		172	2.1	
Turnout		8,288	92.1	
CPNP hold		Swing		

=== Normanby ===
1935 Queensland state election: Normanby
Party	Candidate	Votes	%	±%
Labor	Tom Foley	4,580	68.0	
Social Credit	Albert Webb	2,155	32.0	
Total formal votes		6,735	96.5	
Informal votes		247	3.5	
Turnout		6,982	89.8	
Labor hold		Swing		

=== Nundah ===
1935 Queensland state election: Nundah
Party	Candidate	Votes	%	±%
Labor	John Hayes	6,066	66.5	
CPNP	Alfred Thompson	3,059	33.5	
Total formal votes		9,125	98.9	
Informal votes		102	1.1	
Turnout		9,227	93.8	
Labor hold		Swing		

=== Oxley ===
1935 Queensland state election: Oxley
Party	Candidate	Votes	%	±%
CPNP	Thomas Nimmo	5,051	53.4	
Labor	Wilhelm Thieme	4,408	46.6	
Total formal votes		9,459	97.4	
Informal votes		253	2.6	
Turnout		9,712	93.9	
CPNP hold		Swing		

=== Port Curtis ===
1935 Queensland state election: Port Curtis
Party	Candidate	Votes	%	±%
Labor	Tommy Williams	4,800	55.0	
CPNP	Robert Boyd	2,759	31.6	
Social Credit	William Gresham	1,172	13.4	
Total formal votes		8,731	97.0	
Informal votes		269	3.0	
Turnout		9,000	95.9	
Labor hold		Swing		

- Preferences were not distributed.

=== Rockhampton ===
1935 Queensland state election: Rockhampton
Party	Candidate	Votes	%	±%
Labor	James Larcombe	6,517	72.4	
Social Credit	Vivian Pugh	2,481	27.6	
Total formal votes		8,998	98.2	
Informal votes		169	1.8	
Turnout		9,167	92.1	
Labor hold		Swing		

=== Sandgate ===
1935 Queensland state election: Sandgate
Party	Candidate	Votes	%	±%
Labor	Roland Hislop	4,920	55.0	
CPNP	James Kenny	4,029	45.0	
Total formal votes		8,949	98.5	
Informal votes		137	1.5	
Turnout		9,086	94.9	
Labor gain from CPNP		Swing		

=== South Brisbane ===
1935 Queensland state election: South Brisbane
Party	Candidate	Votes	%	±%
Labor	Vince Gair	6,405	67.6	
CPNP	Robert Paine	3,065	32.4	
Total formal votes		9,470	97.1	
Informal votes		287	2.9	
Turnout		9,757	92.8	
Labor hold		Swing		

=== Stanley ===
1935 Queensland state election: Stanley
Party	Candidate	Votes	%	±%
CPNP	Roy Bell	5,376	64.0	
Labor	Francis Staunton	3,025	36.0	
Total formal votes		8,401	99.1	
Informal votes		73	0.9	
Turnout		8,474	95.6	
CPNP hold		Swing		

=== The Tableland ===
1935 Queensland state election: The Tableland
Party	Candidate	Votes	%	±%
Labor	Harry Bruce	5,907	66.4	
CPNP	Robert Clarke	2,338	26.3	
Communist	Jim Slater	651	7.3	
Total formal votes		8,896	98.8	
Informal votes		108	1.2	
Turnout		9,004	88.3	
Labor hold		Swing		

- Preferences were not distributed.

=== Toowong ===
1935 Queensland state election: Toowong
Party	Candidate	Votes	%	±%
CPNP	James Maxwell	4,781	52.5	
Labor	Edward Turner	3,558	39.1	
Social Credit	Charles Hallick	766	8.4	
Total formal votes		9,105	98.6	
Informal votes		129	1.4	
Turnout		9,234	94.9	
CPNP hold		Swing		

- Preferences were not distributed.

=== Toowoomba ===
1935 Queensland state election: Toowoomba
Party	Candidate	Votes	%	±%
Labor	Evan Llewelyn	5,227	58.8	
CPNP	Les Boyce	2,848	32.0	
Social Credit	Denis Hannay	671	7.6	
Communist	Claude Jones	144	1.6	
Total formal votes		8,890	99.0	
Informal votes		87	1.0	
Turnout		8,977	90.6	
Labor hold		Swing		

- Preferences were not distributed.

==== By-election ====
- This by-election was caused by the resignation of Evan Llewelyn. It was held on 14 December 1935.

1935 Toowoomba state by-election
Party	Candidate	Votes	%	±%
Labor	Jack Duggan	4,552	54.7	−4.1
CPNP	John Robinson	1,674	20.1	−11.9
Independent	Leslie Boyce	1,354	16.3	+16.3
Social Credit	Denis Hannay	747	9.0	+1.4
Total formal votes		8,327	99.3	+0.3
Informal votes		59	0.7	−0.3
Turnout		8,386	86.9	−3.7
Labor hold		Swing	N/A	

=== Townsville ===
1935 Queensland state election: Townsville
Party	Candidate	Votes	%	±%
Labor	Maurice Hynes	6,459	77.0	
CPNP	Percy Davids	1,935	23.0	
Total formal votes		8,394	98.3	
Informal votes		146	1.7	
Turnout		8,540	88.0	
Labor hold		Swing		

=== Warrego ===
1935 Queensland state election: Warrego
Party	Candidate	Votes	%	±%
Labor	Randolph Bedford	unopposed		
Labor hold		Swing		

==== By-election ====
- This by-election was caused by the resignation of Randolph Bedford who attempted to enter Federal politics. He was unsuccessful in his attempt to win the seat of Maranoa, but succeeded in retaining his old seat in the State Assembly afterward.

1937 Warrego state by-election
Party	Candidate	Votes	%	±%
Labor	Randolph Bedford	unopposed		
Labor hold		Swing		

=== Warwick ===
1935 Queensland state election: Warwick
Party	Candidate	Votes	%	±%
Labor	John Healy	4,096	45.8	
CPNP	Daniel Connolly	3,736	41.7	
Independent	Herbert Dight	1,119	12.5	
Total formal votes		8,951	99.4	
Informal votes		57	0.6	
Turnout		9,008	94.3	
Two-party-preferred result
Labor	John Healy	4,247	50.2	
CPNP	Daniel Connolly	4,215	49.8	
Labor gain from CPNP		Swing		

=== West Moreton ===
1935 Queensland state election: West Moreton
Party	Candidate	Votes	%	±%
CPNP	Ted Maher	5,702	68.0	
Independent	Charles Jamieson	2,677	32.0	
Total formal votes		8,379	99.0	
Informal votes		87	1.0	
Turnout		8,466	96.2	
CPNP hold		Swing		

=== Wide Bay ===
1935 Queensland state election: Wide Bay
Party	Candidate	Votes	%	±%
CPNP	Harry Clayton	4,578	55.6	
Social Credit	John Rex	3,655	44.4	
Total formal votes		8,233	98.8	
Informal votes		98	1.2	
Turnout		8,331	93.7	
CPNP hold		Swing		

=== Windsor ===
1935 Queensland state election: Windsor
Party	Candidate	Votes	%	±%
Labor	Herbert Williams	5,253	57.5	
CPNP	Charles Taylor	3,886	42.5	
Total formal votes		9,139	98.5	
Informal votes		141	1.5	
Turnout		9,280	94.4	
Labor gain from CPNP		Swing		

=== Wynnum ===
1935 Queensland state election: Wynnum
Party	Candidate	Votes	%	±%
Labor	John Donnelly	5,005	50.5	
CPNP	James Bayley	3,434	34.7	
Social Credit	Joanna Helbach	1,466	14.8	
Total formal votes		9,905	98.6	
Informal votes		144	1.4	
Turnout		10,049	94.8	
Labor gain from CPNP		Swing		

- Preferences were not distributed.

== See also ==
- 1935 Queensland state election
- Candidates of the Queensland state election, 1935
- Members of the Queensland Legislative Assembly, 1935-1938
