= 1936 Bowen state by-election =

1936none

- 20 June 1936

Electoral district of Bowen in the Legislative Assembly of Queensland
- Turnout: 87.8% (▼6.1)
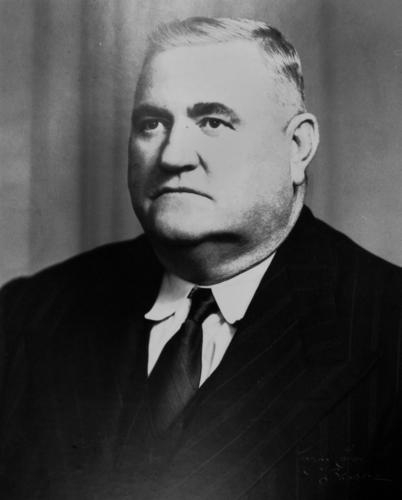

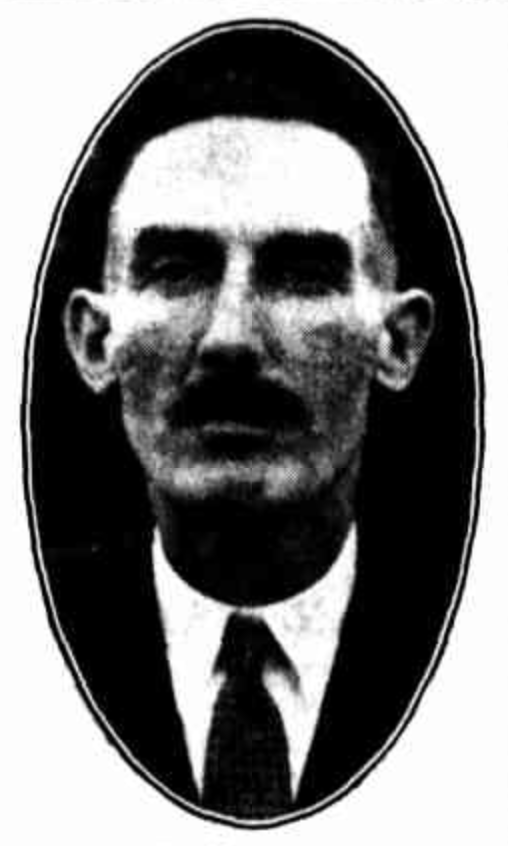

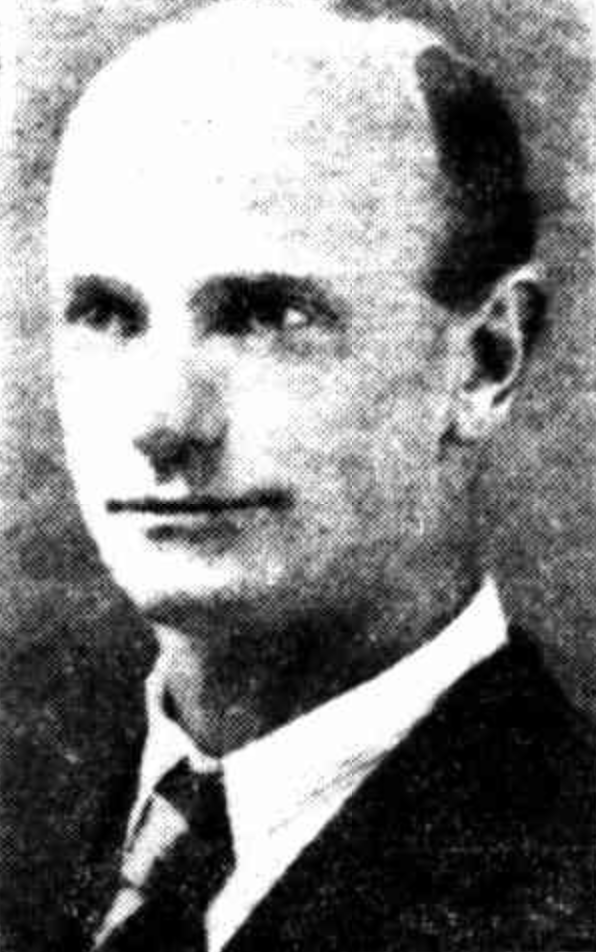
| | First party | Second party | Third party |
|---|---|---|---|
| Candidate | Ernest Riordan | John Smith | Fred Paterson |
| Party | Labor | Country | Communist |
| Primary vote | 2,623 | 2,294 | 1,755 |
| Percentage | 36.2% | 31.7% | 24.3% |
| Swing | ▼16.4 | ▲2.3 | ▲8.7 |
| TCP | 59.2% | 40.8% |
MP before election
Charlie Collins
Labor
Elected MP
Ernest Riordan
Labor

The 1936 Bowen state by-election was held on 20 June 1936 to elect the member for Bowen in the Legislative Assembly of Queensland, following the death of Labor Party MP Charlie Collins. Collins had been named as leader of the Queensland Labor Party only several hours before his death.

== Candidates ==
The candidates in the election were Ernest Joseph "Dick" Riordan from the Labor Party, John. P. Smith from the Country Party, Fred Paterson from the Communist Party of Australia, W. B. Morgan from the Douglas Credit Party and H.I. Madden from 'Farmers and Workers'.

=== Labor ===
The selection of the Labor Party candidate had been hotly contested. A plebiscite was arranged. Riordan, the candidate winning the nomination with 189 votes, was an Australian Workers' Union leader, Bowen Town Council alderman and the brother of "Derby" Riordan. Other candidates in the fray were Wall (97 votes), Nolan (94 votes), Russell (93 votes), Wyper (51 votes), Kennedy (44 votes), Christensen (42 votes), Edwards (37 votes), Tabulo (33 votes), Kiterney (24 votes), Malcolm (23 votes), Walsh (20 votes), Gralton (17 votes), Dixon (16 votes), O'Sullivan (16 votes), Hanley (2 votes) and O'Donoghue (0 votes). Several complaints were lodged regarding the plebiscite.

In their campaign the Labor Party organised many public meetings with speeches.

=== Country ===
This was the first election contested by the Country Party in Queensland. The party announced that five parliamentarians would travel to Bowen to campaign for their candidate, Smith. The campaign of the party relied heavily on support from liberal newspapers, as well as face-to-face encounters with voters. One issue the party tried to raise in their campaign was the construction of Mackay Harbour. Criticizing the incumbent Labor government, the party asked why an artificial harbour at Mackay had been preferred over the natural harbour of Bowen.

== Result ==
1936 Bowen state by-election
| Party | Candidate | Votes | % | ±% |
|---|---|---|---|---|
| Labor | Ernest Riordan | 2,623 | 36.2 | −16.4 |
| Country | John Smith | 2,294 | 31.7 | +2.3 |
| Communist | Fred Paterson | 1,755 | 24.3 | +8.7 |
| Social Credit | Henry Madden | 449 | 6.2 | +6.2 |
| Independent | William Morgan | 116 | 1.6 | +1.6 |
| Total formal votes | | 7,237 | 99.2 | +0.7 |
| Informal votes | | 62 | 0.8 | −0.7 |
| Turnout | | 7,299 | 87.8 | −6.1 |
Two-party-preferred result
| Labor | Ernest Riordan | 3,592 | 59.2 | |
| Country | John Smith | 2,472 | 40.8 | |
| Labor hold | | Swing | N/A | |

Whilst Riordan obtained absolute majority in the final count, the result for the communist candidate was impressive. Paterson managed to obtain 24.3% of the votes. In Collinsville there were just a few dozen votes separating the two candidates. In Proserpine Paterson obtained more votes than Riordan. On 23 June 1936, with almost all primary votes allotted (120 primary votes remained to be counted at the time), Riordan stood at 2623 votes (36.2%), Smith 2294 votes (31.7%), Paterson 1755 votes (24.2%), Madden 449 votes (6.2%) and Morgan 116 votes (1.6%). The final result was declared by Under Secretary of Justice G. A. Carter on 6 July 1936. With the three minor candidates eliminated and their preference votes counted Riordan had 3658 votes (58.9%) and Smith had 2553 votes (41.1%).
