= Jack Henry (Australian communist) =

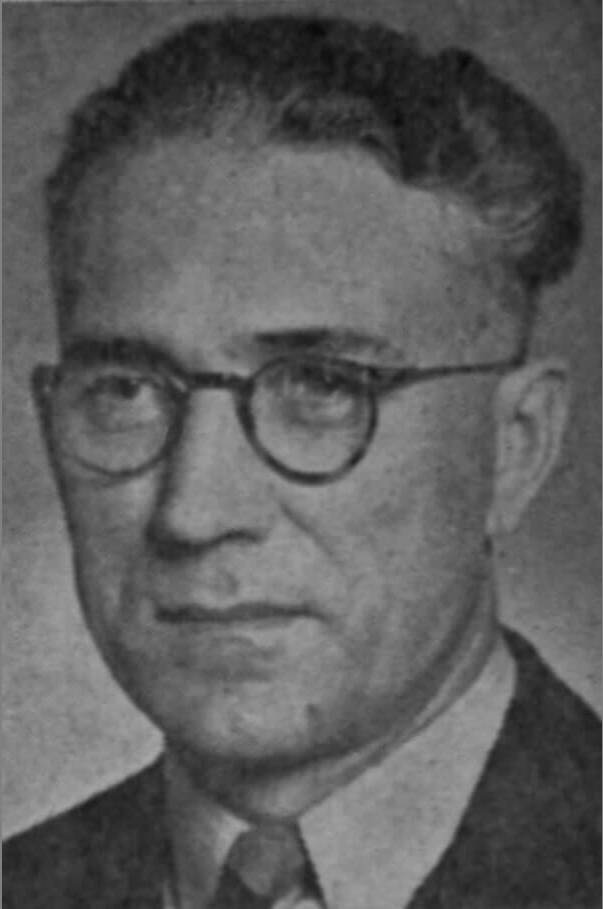

Leader of the Communist Party in Queensland
- In office March 1937 – 1948

Secretary of the Communist Party in Queensland
- In office March 1937 – February 1943
- Succeeded by: Claude Jones

Personal details
- Born: John Clyde Henry; 1904 Coramba, New South Wales, Australia
- Died: 8 May 1976 (aged 71–72) Brisbane, Queensland, Australia
- Cause of death: Myocardial infarction
- Party: Communist (1931–1970)

John Clyde Henry, known as Jack Henry, was an Australian communist party member and former leader of its Queensland branch.

== Early life and career ==
Henry was born in the Northern New South Wales town of Coramba (just outside Coffs Harbour) in 1904. His father was a farmer. Henry moved to South East Queensland at eighteen, working as a labourer, before moving north again a few years later. Henry began work in Tully as a cane-cutter aged twenty-one, and soon joined the Australian Workers' Union (AWU). Encountering marxist ideas during his time as a cane-cutter, Henry eventually joined the Communist Party of Australia (CPA) in Brisbane, 1931.

=== Communist Party ===
After the CPA in Queensland significantly expanded during the '30s, Henry was appointed the fourth branch of the state party (ninth district), "...which stretched north from Brisbane to the Torres Strait Islands" headquartered in Innisfail.

Henry had a reputation for organising workers as well as political proselytising. He played a prominent role in the 1935 Sugar workers' strike, which "the CPA won 'great prestige' in North Queensland," Henry 'playing an outstanding part'.

In 1937 Henry became state leader of the Queensland branch of the Communist Party. While leader, the Communist Party elected numerous politicians, including the first ever MP to a state parliament (Fred Paterson) for Queensland (1944). In February 1942 Henry asked the party State Committee that he be relieved of his duties. Claude Jones was appointed to replace him.

With the success of the party in North Queensland, Henry, as state leader, was one of the most successful Communist candidates for the Communist Party in Queensland. In late November 1970, Henry, a Communist Party member for over thirty-five years, was expelled in vote 12–8 vote after he breached party rules by "refusing to accept and working to frustrate decisions of the State Conference and National Congress, assisting to establish separate organisation within the party around a political platform specifically rejected by the Conference and Congress, and pursuing differences on aims and policies to the point of jeopardising party unity and effectiveness."

=== Electoral history ===
Queensland
Election	Electorate	Votes	%	# (Note: Of candidates running.)	+/–
1935	Herbert	1,520 / 9,087	17.33	3rd of 3	▲16.73
1938	Herbert	1,563 / 9,477	17.02	3rd of 4	▼0.31

Federal
Election	Electorate	Votes	%	#	+/–
1934	Herbert (Qld.)	4,404 / 55,424	7.95	3rd of 4	▲7.95
1946	Herbert (Qld.)	9,404 / 61,358	15.33	3rd of 5	▲7.38
