= Albert State School =

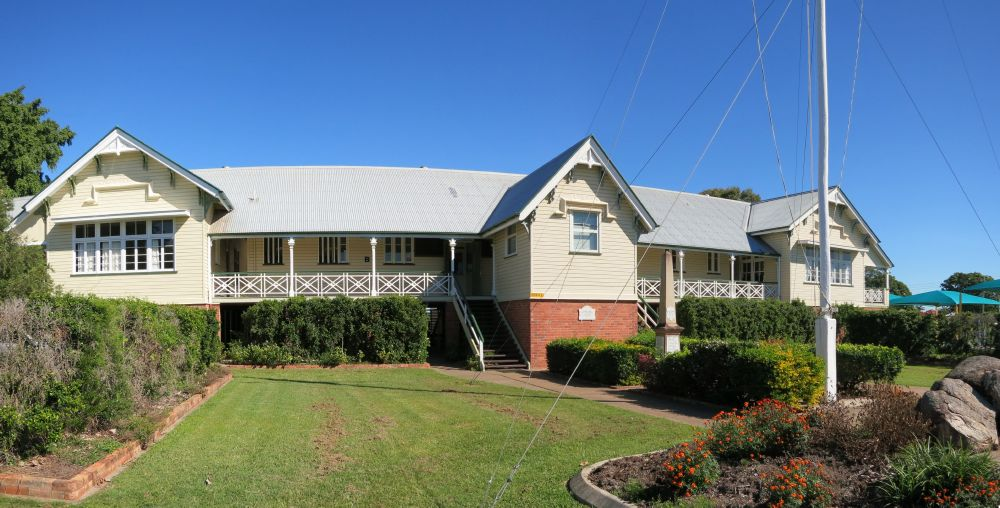
- Albert State School as seen from Albert Street, 2014

- Location within Queensland
- 25.5467°S 152.7035°E
- Location: 210–220 Albert Street, Maryborough, Fraser Coast Region, Queensland, Australia

History
- Built: 1883
- Built for: Department of Public Instruction

Site notes
- Architect: Robert Ferguson
- Architectural style: Carpenter Gothic

Queensland Heritage Register
- Official name: Albert State School;
- Type: state heritage
- Designated: 28 November 2014
- Reference no.: 601525
- Type: Education, research, scientific facility: School-state
- Theme: Creating social and cultural institutions: Commemorating significant events; Educating Queenslanders: Providing primary schooling
- Builders: George William and Edwin Negus

Albert State School is a heritage-listed public coeducational primary school, located at 210–220 Albert Street in the city of Maryborough within the Fraser Coast Region of the Australian state of Queensland. Designed by Robert Ferguson and built in 1883 by George William and Edwin Negus, it was added to the Queensland Heritage Register on 28 November 2014. The school features a war memorial to commemorate past pupils killed during World War I. It is administered by the Queensland Department of Education, with an enrolment of 118 students and a teaching staff of eight, as of 2023. The school serves students from Prep to Year 6.

== History ==
Albert State School opened in Maryborough in 1883, during a significant period of expansion in the town, largely driven by the discovery of gold in the region in 1867, which established Maryborough as the port for Gympie. Although the first government school (Maryborough Central State School) opened in 1862, Maryborough saw rapid growth in educational institutions beginning in 1875, with nine schools established in a 16-year period. Albert State School was one of these, founded two years after the completion of the North Coast railway line, which bolstered the town's status as a regional center.

As the town developed, the school expanded to include additional structures and landscaping. It has been in continuous operation since its establishment and has long served as a focal point for the local community, hosting important social and cultural activities.

=== Planning and construction ===
Planning for Albert State School occurred during 1881 beginning with choosing a 2 acres (0.81 ha) lot in January. Fundraising began in March and tenders were called in August for construction of a 'spacious and well-designed school house, and a master's residence'. This was won by local contractor, Messrs George William and Edwin Negus. The final construction cost was £2500.

Albert State School was built to a standard plan supplied by the Queensland Government. The government developed standard plans for its school buildings to help ensure consistency and economy. From the 1860s until the 1960s, Queensland school buildings were predominantly timber-framed, an easy and cost-effective approach that also enabled the government to provide facilities in remote areas. Standard designs were continually refined in response to changing needs and educational philosophy and Queensland school buildings were particularly innovative in climate control, lighting, and ventilation. Standardisation produced distinctly similar schools across Queensland with complexes of typical components.

The teaching building for Albert State School was built facing northeast to Albert Street and was a standard design by architect, Robert Ferguson. Ferguson was appointed in 1879 by the Department of Public Instruction as its first Superintendent of Buildings. Ferguson immediately revised the design of schools to address deficiencies in ventilation and lighting and this period of school design was pivotal in this regard. Ferguson introduced tall and decorative ventilation spires to the roof and louvred panels to the gable apex to vent the classrooms. Additional and larger windows were incorporated with high sill heights that did not allow draughts and sunlight to enter the room. The overall form was lowset on brick piers and in larger schools multiple classrooms were arranged symmetrically around a parade ground. The designs remained single-skin to eliminate "receptacles for germs and vermin" but were lined externally rather than internally to address the previous weathering problem. Notably, Ferguson's buildings were decoratively treated with a variety of elaborate timber work and were heralded by educationalists as "far superior in design, material and workmanship to any we have before built".

In 1885 Robert Ferguson was replaced by his brother John Ferguson who continued to implement his brother's designs until his death in 1893, when responsibility for school buildings passed back to the Department of Public Works. The Ferguson period (1879–1893) is distinct and marked by extensive redesign of school buildings including associated structures and furniture. The Ferguson brothers' designs were reflective of educational requirements of the time, responsive to criticism of previous designs, revolutionary in terms of internal environmental quality, technically innovative, popular and successful and provided a long-lasting legacy of good school design.

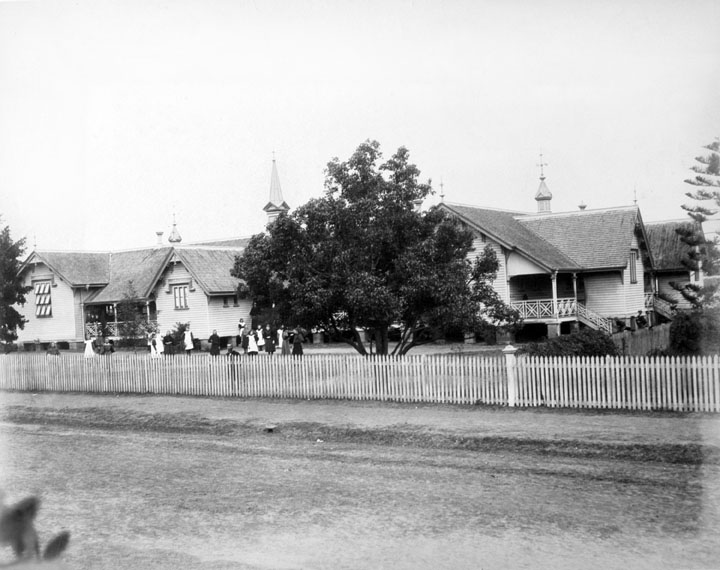
Albert State School, circa 1890

The teaching building at Albert State School was typical of Ferguson's designs. It was a large, lowset timber-framed building with a multi-gabled roof and prominent ventilation roof spire. It accommodated students in three large classrooms with verandahs on all sides. The building was attractively decorated with Carpenter Gothic timber work. The central wing accommodated rooms for hats, cloaks and lavatories at either end, and was separated by passageways from the classrooms in each side wing.

=== Founding and early development ===
In the original gazettal notice of 1883, the school was officially named "The Albert State School"; however, it was subsequently known simply as Albert State School.

The school was established on 6 July 1883, and opened on 9 July 1883 with 220 children and 80 visitors present, despite only 100 students being officially enrolled at the time. Although the building was designed to accommodate up to 250 students, by September there was an average attendance of 320 students, and by the end of the school year attendance reached 450. The unusually rapid increase of students was remarkable, demanding more classroom space urgently. Extensions to the building, also by Robert Ferguson, were designed in late 1884. A large classroom was added to the rear of each side wing, and two hat and cloak rooms were added to both the northwest and southeast outer verandahs. In form and detail, the new work was identical to the existing. Construction began immediately and was completed in 1885 by contractor John Jones. A newspaper reported that year that Albert State School was "said to be the second best in the colony", and by December 1888, the school roll was numbered at 600.

In 1891 the average daily attendance was 611, making it the largest coeducational school in Queensland at the time. By 1894 the number of students attending the school had risen to 854, but had decreased to 786 by 1896. A newspaper report of 1896 said it was the largest and best equipped school in Maryborough, the district, and (in some respects) Queensland. It emphasised the high academic achievement of its graduates and its superior and extensive educational equipment, the excellent sanitary facilities, and the beautiful grounds with camphor laurel and fig trees.

The trees on the grounds of Albert State School were notably highlighted in an 1890 newspaper article about the school's Arbor Day celebrations. On this occasion, 82 trees were planted, with the article anticipating that they would "form a very pretty avenue" in the years to come. During the event, the mayor at the time, Mr. George Stupart, visited the school and addressed the pupils, emphasizing the significance of Arbor Day and the importance of tree planting.

Albert State School, circa 1915

The grounds of Albert State School were extensively planted and accommodated large open play areas, typical of Queensland schools. The provision of outdoor play space was a result of an early and continued commitment to play-based education and schools were built on spacious grounds to facilitate this. The grounds were planted with trees and gardens for beautification and shade, critical in Queensland. A 1915 report of Albert State School stated that the trees were tended with "solicitous care" and the school grounds were densely shaded, with classes held under the trees, benefitting the health of the pupils. The school was described as one of the "beauty spots" of the town and the Education Department should "justly be proud of its educative work in this direction".

=== World War I ===
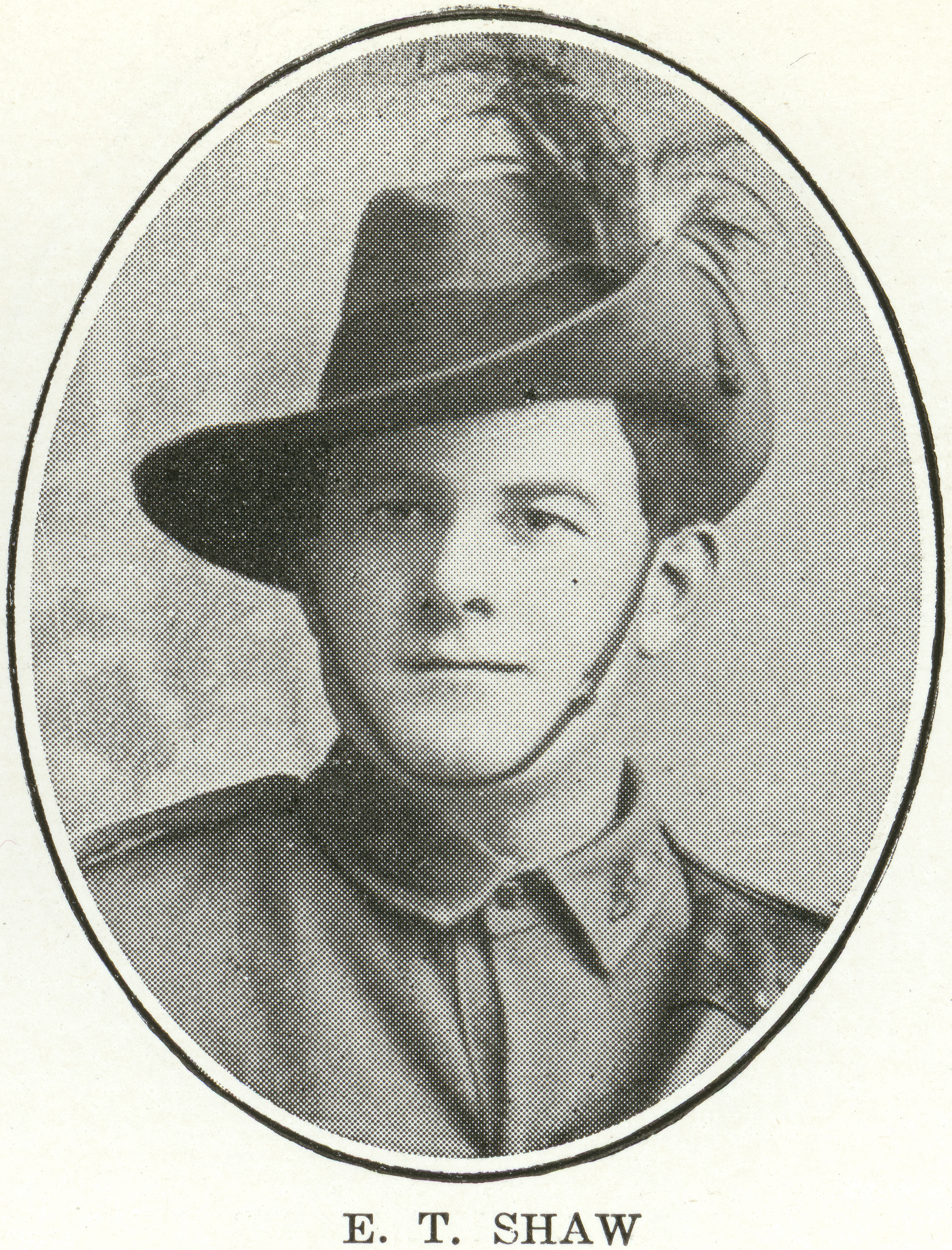
Edward Thomas Shaw, former pupil of Albert State School, killed in France in World War I

A war memorial was built at the front of Albert State School and was unveiled by the Mayor of Maryborough, George Holbut, on 14 December 1917. It was a tall sandstone obelisk to commemorate past pupils killed during World War I, which was still ongoing at that time, and was built from donations by relatives and friends of the dead servicemen. It had 25 names on two of its four marble panels – another 18 names would later be added as the war continued. Over time, the obelisk became the site for remembrance ceremonies for the school and local community.

=== Post-World War I ===
Over time, the Ferguson teaching building at Albert State School was altered to meet contemporary educational demands, particularly for improved lighting and ventilation. The Department of Public Works greatly improved the natural ventilation and lighting of classroom interiors, experimenting with different combinations of roof ventilators, ceiling and wall vents, larger windows, dormer windows and ducting. Achieving an ideal or even adequate level of natural light in classrooms, without glare, was of critical importance to educationalists and consequently it became central to the design and layout of all school buildings. Existing lowset buildings were raised for increased ventilation with the added benefit of providing a covered play space in the understorey. In 1926 the Ferguson teaching building at Albert State School was raised on tall brick piers and the ground underneath was concreted to create a large, understorey play space.

Another standard alteration was to the fenestration and classroom size of existing buildings. At schools across the state, windows were enlarged and sills lowered to let in more light generally. Smaller classrooms provided a greater amount of natural light so large classrooms were subdivided. Interiors became lighter and airier and met with immediate approval from educationalists. During the 1920s and 1930s alterations were made to the vast majority of older school buildings to upgrade their lighting and ventilation. Although these changes occurred at Albert State School, it was to a lesser extent than most schools, with the Ferguson teaching building retaining most of its high-level windows. However, the existing windows in the gable walls facing the street were enlarged using banks of casements to brighten and better ventilate the rooms. In addition, all but one of the classrooms were divided with new partitions to create smaller rooms.

=== Mid-20th Century ===
In 1930 a marble tablet was unveiled by Director of Education, BJ McKenna in front of a very large gathering at the school. The tablet was prominently mounted centrally at the front of the Ferguson teaching building and was a memorial to the late George James, head teacher of the school for 24 years.

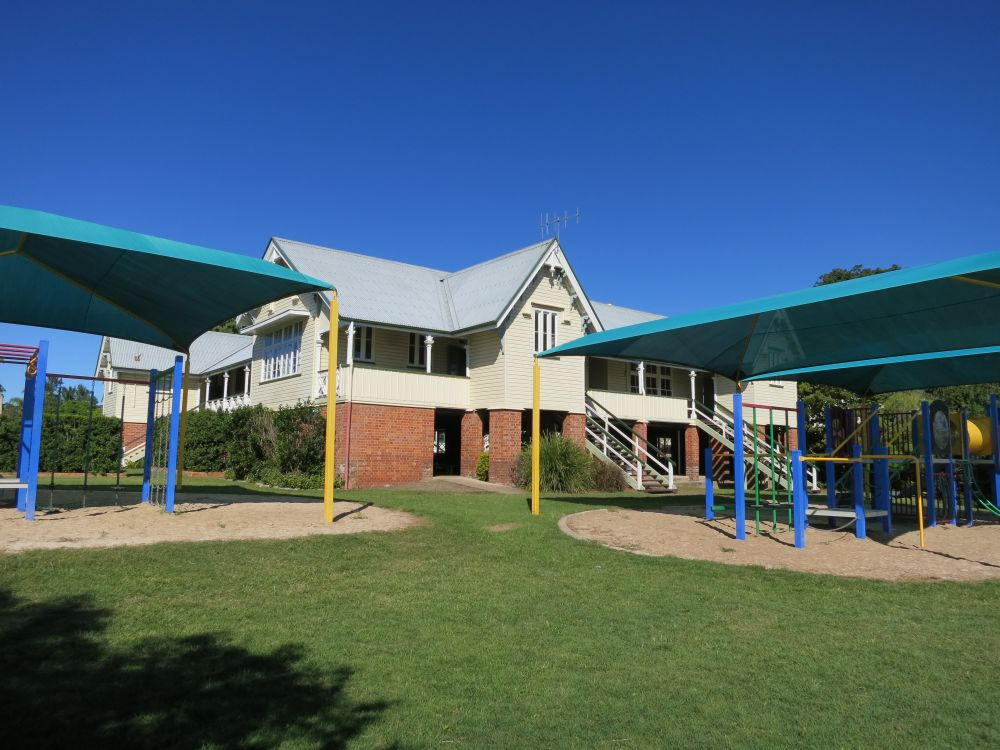
Rear view with playsheds, 2014

In 1932 a new highset teaching building was constructed at Albert State School to a standard design by the Department of Public Works. Accommodating infants, this building was attached to the rear of the eastern wing of the Ferguson building and was extended and altered over time.

The accommodation at the school remained relatively static between 1932 and the 1980s; however, the grounds were expanded to provide more room for recreation. An additional 0.5 acres (0.20 ha) of land was obtained on the southeast side of the school between 1951 and 1961, while land across Zante Street to the northwest was acquired from 1960. Land was also obtained c. 1977 on the other side of Albert Street from the school, for a pre-school building, and later sold.

Over time, some alteration of the Ferguson teaching building occurred, however, as this work was minor, the bulk of the building remained largely unchanged. To modernise and brighten the classrooms, in 1954 the interior walls were lined with sheet material and a flat ceiling was installed concealing the roof trusses. Between 1973 and 1977 the hat and cloak rooms on the verandahs were extended, providing small rooms for storage and staff. The large classroom in the centre wing was altered to accommodate administration in 1978 and in 1981 part of a verandah was enclosed for a staff room. In 1988 a further part of a verandah was enclosed and more partitions were inserted. At some time, the roof fleches were removed.

Between the 1960s and 1980s Queensland education was reformed. The Education Act 1964 was a turning point and the first major update of Queensland education's governing legislation since 1875. Effectively, a new era of state education began and required new architectural responses. The Department of Education (as it had been renamed in 1957) continued to give the responsibility of school design to the architects of the Department of Public Works. New materials, technologies, educational philosophies, government policies, architectural styles, and functional requirements influenced the evolution of standard designs and the predominance of highset, timber-framed buildings decreased.

=== Late 20th and Early 21st Century ===
After a long period of relative inactivity, changes began to occur at Albert State School that reflected the push to modernise. The original teacher's residence, on the corner of Albert and Zante streets, was removed c. 1979-1988. In 1985 a tuckshop and toilet block was built behind the main building; a janitor's and sports equipment store was added to the northwest in 1986, and in 1987 a new two-storey teaching building was constructed on the site of the original tennis courts, later extended in 1989 and 1992. Shade structures were added in the 1990s and in 2010 two new buildings were added to the school grounds – a multipurpose hall and a teaching building. Through a gradual acquisition of land across Zante Street (including a closed section of the road itself), the school grounds totalled 2.9 hectares (7.2 acres) by 2014.

In 2014, the school continues to operate from the site and the Ferguson teaching building remains highly intact. The school is important to the city having operated since 1883 and having taught generations of Maryborough students. Since establishment it has been a key social focus for the Maryborough community with the grounds and buildings having been the location of many social events over time.

== Description ==
Albert State School comprises a substantial teaching building and war memorial standing on spacious grounds with mature trees on a corner site in Maryborough. The school is in a low-density residential neighbourhood near the main centre of town and is prominent within its context.

Facing northeast and overlooking the main entrance on Albert Street is a large, symmetrical building (Ferguson teaching building) set back from the front boundary behind an expansive lawn, garden beds and mature trees. A formally arranged memorial garden is situated at the entrance comprising timber flagstaff, concrete paths and low hedges in symmetrically arranged brick garden beds. Within the garden, a sandstone obelisk bears four leaded marble tablets listing 43 past pupils who died in World War I. Behind the memorial, mounted to the front of the school building, is a marble tablet memorial to George James, a past head teacher of the school.

The Ferguson teaching building is highly intact. It is a large, timber-framed building clad in chamferboards and highset on steel posts with perimeter brick walls and square brick piers around an open understorey play area with concrete floor and small, brick store rooms. The bricks are visibly of two different ages indicating the original lowset form of the building. Each of the three wings of the U-shaped building, formed around a parade ground, has wide verandahs running lengthways on both sides with attached teachers' rooms. The prominent corrugated metal-clad roof has multiple, intersecting and projecting gables. Its gable ends feature a variety of elaborate timberwork, including: moulded barge boards; scrolled, paired eaves brackets; fretwork; mouldings; stop-chamfering; lattice; finials; and pendants. Metal louvres in the apex of the gables vent the roof space.

The building retains hood mouldings and windows that rarely survive at other, similar schools and are distinguishing features. The gable ends of the side wings retain sheet-metal hood mouldings, over banks of timber-framed casement windows with fanlights and sunhoods, which indicate the location and size of the original narrow windows. In other locations above high level sills are original tall, narrow windows with vertically centre-pivoting sashes and later casement windows.

Accessed by timber stairs, the verandahs feature a variety of high-quality, decorative treatments, including diagonally-laid timber board ceilings, brackets, stop chamfered posts with mouldings, and an elaborate, cross-braced balustrade. The verandahs also retain original tall, high-level windows into the classrooms, as well as banks of later timber-framed, double hung sashes with fanlights. Mounted on the front verandah wall facing the street are large, timber honour boards that list high-achieving pupils and more of these boards are in storage on site. The building retains rows of metal hat hooks as well as an early sink. Original timber French doors with tall fanlights provide access into the interior.

Internally, the original large classrooms are divided by more recent light-weight partitions into smaller rooms; however, the northwest wing retains one classroom of original size. The interior walls of the classrooms and teacher's rooms are lined with more recent sheet material and a suspended ceiling has been installed throughout. The partitions and linings are reversible. Short lengths of the verandahs have been enclosed and the verandah wall removed to incorporate this space into the classroom. The building retains original doors including large, braced board doors and panelled doors with bolection moulding and original door and window hardware.

An early school bell is mounted to a timber post near the verandah of the northwest wing and the school retains a collection of early school-related paraphernalia including desks, cabinets, chairs, administration books, a bell, photographs, trophies, shields, sewing, an ink well, cane, and piano with stool.

Other structures within the heritage boundary are not considered to be of cultural heritage significance.

== Notable alumni ==
- Myles Ferricks, Australian senator.
- Grace O’Hanlon, New Zealand field hockey player

== Heritage listing ==
Albert State School was listed on the Queensland Heritage Register on 28 November 2014 having satisfied the following criteria.

=== Queensland's history ===
Albert State School (established in 1883) is important in demonstrating the evolution of state education and its associated architecture in Queensland. The place retains an excellent, representative example of a standard government-designed school building that was an architectural response to prevailing government educational philosophies.

Constructed during a major boom period, Albert State School is also important in demonstrating the expansion of Maryborough in the 1870s and 1880s. Maryborough was a prominent and prosperous centre in colonial Queensland, which is reflected by the high-quality and size of the Ferguson teaching building.

=== Cultural places ===
Albert State School is important in demonstrating the principal characteristics of early Queensland state schools with their later modifications. These include: generous, landscaped sites with mature shade trees and assembly/play areas; and highset timber-framed teaching buildings of standard designs that incorporate understorey play areas, verandahs, and classrooms with high levels of natural light and ventilation.

The substantial, timber-framed teaching building designed by architect, Robert Ferguson is highly-intact, which is rare, and is important in demonstrating the principal characteristics of this type. It retains: a symmetrical, U-shaped plan form of large classrooms surrounded by generous verandahs with projecting teacher's rooms; high-quality timber decorative detailing; and effective natural lighting and ventilation features.

=== Aesthetic significance ===
Albert State School features the Ferguson teaching building, set within landscaped grounds with mature shade trees. Near the front entrance of the school is a war memorial consisting of large sandstone obelisk, paths, garden beds and a tall flagstaff, which serves as the site for for annual remembrance ceremonies. The Ferguson teaching building is symmetrical in design and is adorned with decorative timber work.

=== Special association ===
Queensland schools have always played an important part in Queensland communities. They typically retain a significant and enduring connection with former pupils, parents, and teachers; provide a venue for social interaction and volunteer work; and are a source of pride, symbolising local progress and aspirations. Albert State School has a strong and ongoing association with the Maryborough community. It was established in 1883 through the fundraising efforts of the local community and has educated generations of Maryborough children. The place is important for its contribution to the educational development of Maryborough and is a prominent community focal point and gathering place for social and commemorative events with widespread community support.

== See also ==
- List of schools in Wide Bay–Burnett
- History of state education in Queensland
