= Cooloola Christian College =

School in Queensland, Australia

Location
- 1 College Road; Southside, Gympie, Queensland; Australia; 26.19823°S 152.64272°E

Information
- Type: Private, coeducational, primary, Secondary, day school
- Motto: Wisdom, Knowledge, Understanding
- Denomination: Baptist, Wesleyan Methodist, Presbyterian, Church of Christ, Christian
- Established: 1992
- Sister school: Marivari Primary School
- Enrolment: 470 (2023)
- Colour: Teal Navy
- Slogan: Supporting Families, Transforming Lives
- Website: www.ccc.qld.edu.au

Cooloola Christian College (CCC) is an independent non-denominational Christian co-educational P-12 school located in the city of Gympie, Queensland, Australia. It is administered by Independent Schools Queensland, with an enrolment of 470 students and a teaching staff of 44, as of 2023. The school serves students from Prep to Year 12.

== History ==
A public meeting took place on 5 May 1990, to assess public interest in establishing a Christian school within the region. The school was established on 1 January 1992, and opened on 3 February 1992, with 57 foundation students.

== Demographics ==
In 2023, the school had a student enrollment of 470 with 44 teachers (35.4 full-time equivalent) and 38 non-teaching staff (25.6 full-time equivalent). Female enrollments consisted of 238 students and Male enrollments consisted of 232 students; Indigenous enrollments accounted for a total of 4% and 4% of students had a language background other than English.

== See also ==
- Education in Australia
- List of schools in Wide Bay–Burnett
