= Communist Party of Australia – Queensland =

Queensland Communist Party Queensland Communist Group
- Abbreviation: CPA-Q, QCP, QCG
- Leader: Jack Henry
- Founded: 1920; 1921
- Dissolved: 1991
- Preceded by: Australian Socialist Party
- Headquarters: Brisbane, South East Queensland
- Newspaper: The North Queensland Guardian (Note: The QCP had numerous journals and newspapers throughout its existence including The Communist, which was the party's first official journal. The North Queensland Guardian was its most prominent journal.)
- Membership (1952): 1,032 (Note: Although the party's peak membership was likely during the '40s, the exact figure is unknown, or unpublished. In July 1935 the party membership was allegedly 500. Stuart Macintyre, writing in The Party: The Communist Party of Australia From Heyday to Reckoning, stated that the party membership at 1952 was 1,032.)
- Ideology: Communism; Marxism–Leninism
- Political position: Far-left
- National affiliation: Federal Communist
- International affiliation: Comintern (1921–1943)
- Colors: Red
- Slogan: "All power to the workers"
- Anthem: "The Internationale"
- Legislative Assembly: 1 / 62 (1944–1950)

The Communist Party of Australia – Queensland (CPA-Q), also known or referred to as the Queensland Communist Party (QCP) and the Queensland Communist Group, was the Queensland branch of the national Communist Party (CPA). Established approximately at the same time as its parent party, the QCP was one of the party's three largest branches, sitting behind the New South Wales and Victorian branches in electoral results, membership and popularity.

Its main headquarters and support-base was in the South East Queensland region, however the party also maintained strong support in and around Townsville in North Queensland. Indeed, unlike the national Communist Party's steep decline in membership during the Cold War years, North Queensland saw no noticeable decline.

Holding numerous Councillors throughout the state, the QCP is the only party branch that held a member of parliament to a state legislature.

== Electoral results ==
=== State ===
Queensland
Election	Candidates	Votes	%	+/–	Seats	
1929	4 / 72	2,890 / 438,248	0.66	▲0.66	0	Steady
1932	6 / 62	1,057 / 450,367	0.23	▼0.43	0	Steady
1935	10 / 62	6,101 / 470,631	1.30	▲1.07	0	Steady
1938	8 / 62	8,510 / 539,037	1.58	▲0.28	0	Steady
1941 (Note: The 1941 results include candidates that were associated with the Communist Party and ran as "Independent Socialists.")	12 / 62	16,044 / 529,247	3.03	▲1.45	0	Steady
1944	5 / 62	12,467 / 512,768	2.43	▼0.60	1	▲1
1947	5 / 62	7,870 / 632,899	1.24	▼1.19	1	Steady
1950	7 / 75	2,351 / 636,750	0.37	▼0.87	0	▼1
