= Wooroonden State School =

Defunct school in Queensland, Australia

- The old Wooroonden State School as viewed from Bradleys Road, 2015.

Location
- North-western corner of Bradleys Road and Webbers Bridge Road; Wooroonden, South Burnett Region, Queensland, 4605; Australia; 26.119184°S 151.757033°E

Information
- Former name: Woroon State School and Woroonden State School
- Type: State primary school
- Established: 14 October 1918
- Status: Closed
- Closed: 1963

Wooroonden State School was a one-teacher state school in Wooroonden, South Burnett Region, Queensland, Australia. During its operation, the school was within the Shire of Wondai. However, the former school site is now within the South Burnett Region. Wooroonden is within Division 5 of the South Burnett Regional Council local government area.

== History ==
=== Opening ===
The school was approved in 1917 and opened on 14 October 1918 as Woroon State School on land given to the government by Oscar Sidney Wallace, a section of whose property at the corner of Bradleys Road and Webbers Bridge Road was a convenient location for a school.

=== Nomenclature ===
The school opened as Woroon State School in 1918. It was renamed Woroonden State School in 1925. The locality of Woroonden was officially renamed Wooroonden in 2002 to end many years of both spellings being used.

=== Closure ===
The school's admission register extends to 29 January 1963, and the school closed at the end of that year. A school bus service that had already been established for secondary students subsequently transported both primary and secondary students to schools in Murgon. After the school closed, the grounds were renamed Hughie Campbell Memorial Park.

== Alumni ==
Donald Angus Beaton Condie was a former pupil of Wooroonden State School and later served in the Royal Australian Air Force during the Second World War.

== See also ==
- List of schools in Wide Bay–Burnett
- Education in Queensland
- Queensland state schools
- History of state education in Queensland
- List of schools in Queensland
- Lists of schools in Australia
