= The North Queensland Guardian =

- 14 May 1943 issue of The North Queensland Guardian
- Publisher: Queensland State Committee, Communist Party of Australia
- Editor-in-chief: Fred Paterson
- Founded: 1 May 1937
- Ceased publication: 5 November 1943
- Political alignment: Communist
- Language: English language
- Headquarters: Townsville
- Circulation: 5,100 (May 1937)

The North Queensland Guardian was a newspaper published from Townsville, in the Australian state of Queensland between 1937 and 1943. The newspaper was published by the Queensland State Committee of the Communist Party of Australia. Fred Paterson was the chairman of the editorial board of the newspaper.

== Founding ==
The first issue was published on May Day 1937. The first editorial of the newspaper stated that The North Queensland Guardian would launch "...a crusade against poverty; a crusade against war; a crusade against governmental tyranny and despotism".

== Profile ==
The North Queensland Guardian was the first communist newspaper in the state with a degree of success. Under Paterson's editorship the hammer and sickle was removed from the front page of the newspaper. Unlike other Communist Party of Australia organs, The North Queensland Guardian carried commercial advertisements. It carried articles on sports and social events, dedicating significant attention to women's activities. By May 1937 the newspaper reached a circulation of 5,100 copies. It was sold at two pence per issue.

== Murri issue ==
In 1938 the newspaper condemned the moves to displace the Murri people and confiscate their wages, and called on its sympathizers to side with the Aborigines Progressive Association.

== Ban ==
With the outbreak of the Second World War in 1939, the Australian communist press was confronted with increasing censorship issues. On 27 May 1940 the newspaper was banned. The newspaper was published illegally between June 1940 and 8 January 1943. During this time its size was reduced.

== Later period ==
The last issue of The North Queensland Guardian was published on 5 November 1943. It was superseded by The Queensland Guardian, published from Brisbane.
