= Edwin Caine =

Australian politician

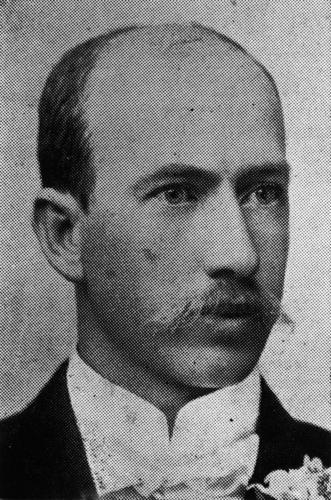

Member of the Queensland Legislative Assembly for Bowen
- In office 27 April 1912 – 22 May 1915
- Preceded by: Myles Ferricks
- Succeeded by: Charles Collins

Personal details
- Born: Edwin James Caine; 8 September 1873 Brisbane, Queensland, Australia
- Died: 26 September 1956 (aged 83) Rockhampton, Queensland, Australia
- Resting place: Toowong Cemetery
- Party: Ministerialist
- Spouse: Cecilia Jane Anthony (m.1901 d.1950)
- Occupation: Barrister, Solicitor

Edwin James Caine (8 September 1873 – 26 September 1956) was a barrister and member of the Queensland Legislative Assembly.

Caine was born at Brisbane, Queensland, to parents James Joseph Caine and his wife Emily (née Wells) and was educated at Brisbane South State School and Brisbane Grammar School. He began his career as a solicitor, becoming a partner in Bergin, Caine & Macrossan with the business operating from 1911 until 1924. He was called to the bar in 1913.

== Political career ==
Caine's first attempt to enter Queensland Parliament came in the 1908 state election when, as a Ministerialist candidate, he contested the seat of Bowen, losing to the Labour candidate, Francis Kenna. Just one year later, parliament was dissolved, and another state election had to be held. Caine stood again for the seat of Bowen, but once again he was unsuccessful, this time losing to Myles Ferricks, another Labour candidate.

Caine finally found success at the 1912 state election, when he defeated Ferricks to win the seat of Bowen. Caine held the seat for just one term, losing to Charles Collins in 1915.

== Personal life ==
On 12 June 1901, Caine married Cecilia Jane Anthony (died 1950) and together they had four daughters. He died in Rockhampton in September 1956 and his body was bought back to Brisbane for burial at Toowong Cemetery.

Parliament of Queensland
Preceded by Myles Ferricks	Member for Bowen; 1912–1915	Succeeded by Charles Collins
