= Myles Ferricks =

Australian politician (1875–1932)

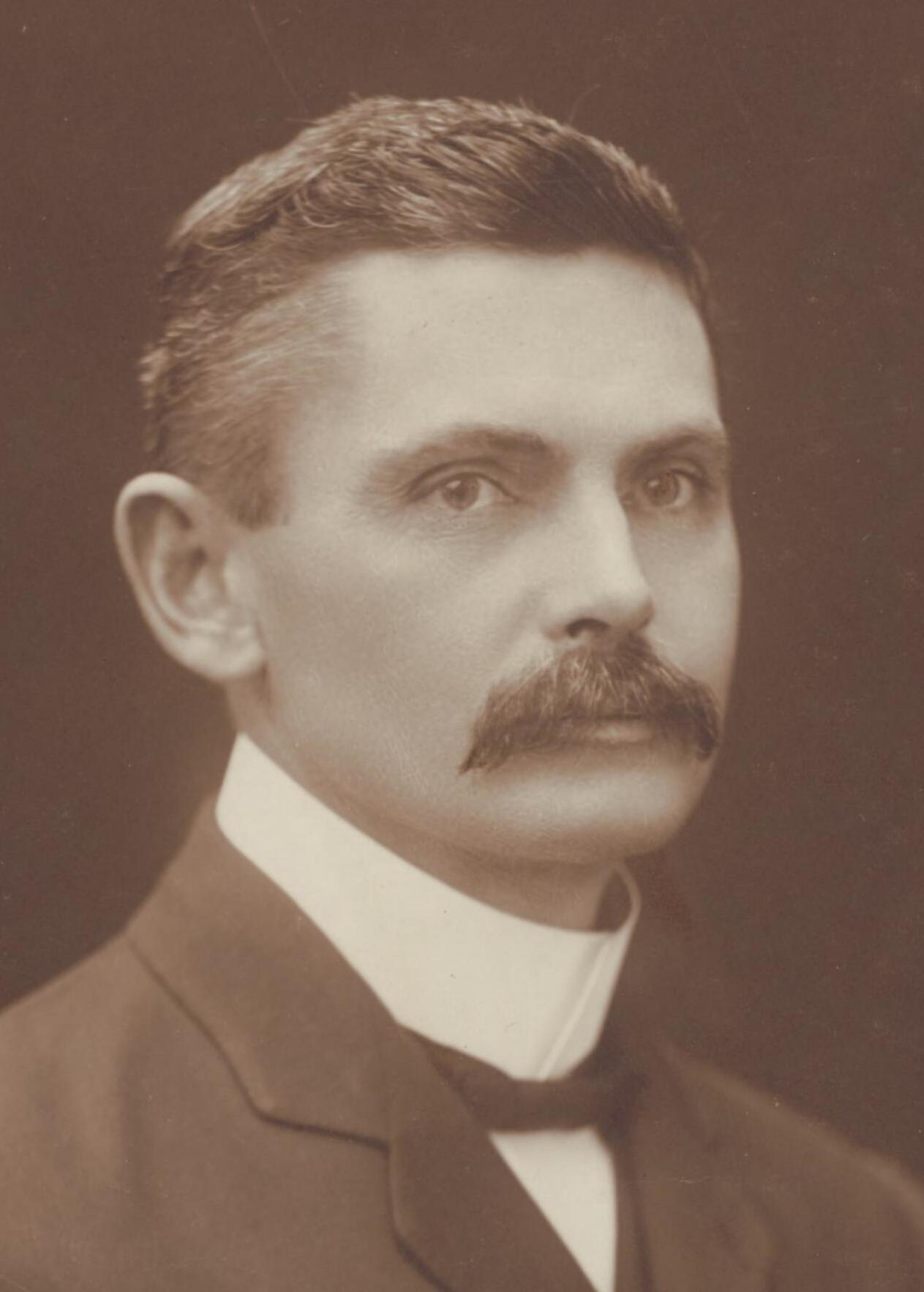

Senator for Queensland
- In office 1 July 1913 – 30 June 1920

Member of the Queensland Legislative Assembly for Bowen
- In office 2 October 1909 – 27 April 1912
- Preceded by: Francis Kenna
- Succeeded by: Edwin Caine

Member of the Queensland Legislative Assembly for South Brisbane
- In office 9 October 1920 – 11 May 1929
- Preceded by: Edgar Free
- Succeeded by: Neil MacGroarty

Personal details
- Born: Myles Aloysius Ferricks; 12 November 1875 Maryborough, Queensland, Australia
- Died: 21 August 1932 (aged 56) Eagle Junction, Queensland, Australia
- Resting place: Nudgee Cemetery
- Party: Australian Labor Party
- Spouse: Beatrice Waugh (m. 1909)
- Occupation: Schoolteacher; Manual worker Journalist

Myles Aloysius Ferricks (12 November 1875 – 21 August 1932) was an Australian politician. He was a member of the Australian Labor Party (ALP) and served as a Senator for Queensland from 1913 to 1920. He was also a member of the Queensland Legislative Assembly from 1909 to 1912 and from 1920 to 1929. He was associated with the militant wing of the ALP and was known for his opposition to World War I conscription in Australia and support for the White Australia policy. Prior to entering politics he worked as a schoolteacher and journalist and was active in the labour movement on the Central Queensland goldfields.

== Early life ==
Ferricks was born on 12 November 1875 in Maryborough, Queensland. He was the son of Mary (née Sheridan) and Austin Ferricks. He was raised in a working-class Irish Catholic family.

Ferricks was educated at the Albert State School and the Christian Brothers' College, Maryborough, where he passed his junior certificate. After leaving school he worked as a schoolteacher for a period before joining Queensland Railways as an engine-driver based in Rockhampton. He later moved to the goldfields around Charters Towers and Ravenswood, working as a miner and cyanide plant operator and winding engine driver. He was secretary of the Ravenswood branches of the Australian Workers' Union and Miners' Accident Association and edited the Ravenswood Mining Journal.

Following a downturn in the mining industry, Ferricks moved to Proserpine and became a sugar-grower. He was also editor of the Bowen Independent, a local newspaper. He played high-level rugby union, representing Rockhampton in matches against New South Wales and visiting Sydney with a Central Queensland representative team in 1895.

== State politics, 1909–1912 ==
Ferricks was elected to the Queensland Legislative Assembly at the 1909 state election, winning back the seat of Bowen for the Australian Labor Party (ALP) from Francis Kenna, a former Labor member who had defected to the Kidstonites following the earlier party split. He supported the 1911 Queensland sugar strike and the 1912 Brisbane general strike. He lost his seat at the 1912 state election, possibly due to anti-union sentiment in his rural constituency.

In 1913, Ferricks was sued for defamation by Queensland premier Digby Denham over remarks alleging Denham's family firms of produce merchants was "fleecing" Queensland farmers. He was represented by future Labor leader T. J. Ryan and eventually reached a settlement with Denham.

== Federal politics, 1913–1920 ==
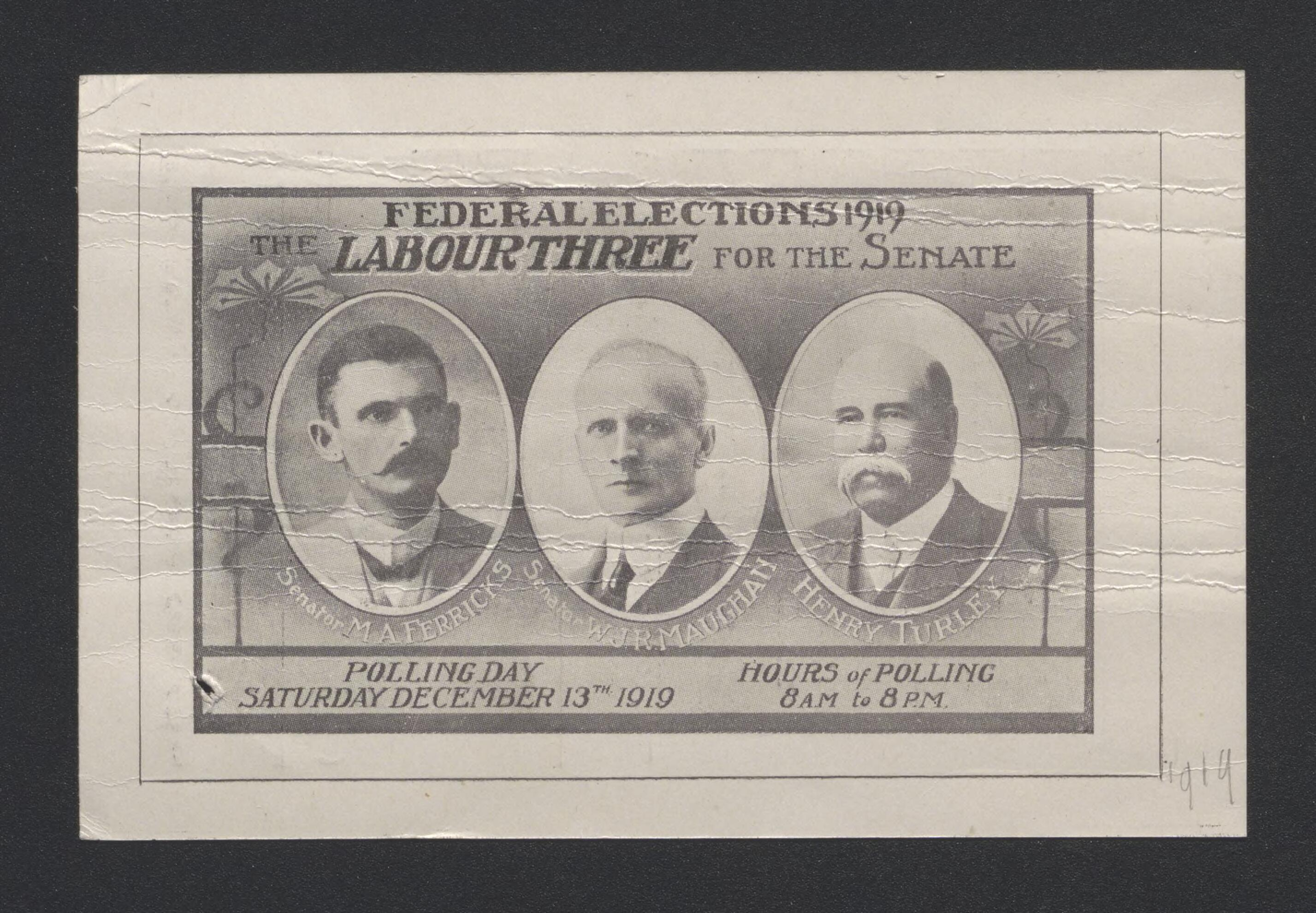
Campaign material for Ferricks and his Queensland ALP colleagues William Maughan and Henry Turley at the 1919 federal election

At the 1913 federal election, Ferricks was elected to a six-year term commencing on 1 July 1913. His term was cut short by a double dissolution but he was re-elected to a further six-year term at the 1914 election. He was defeated for re-election at the 1919 election with his term ending on 30 June 1920.

Ferricks was known for his fervent support of the White Australia policy and particular opposition to Chinese migration, which he viewed as an "invasion". He made anti-Chinese remarks in the Senate on a number of occasions and criticised the Chinatowns in North Queensland and the Northern Territory. He believed the federal administration of the Northern Territory "was lax on White Australia and overprotective of corporate interests including those of the Vestey Brothers".

Ferricks was a critic of Australian participation in World War I and became a leading opponent of wartime conscription. He viewed the war as a manifestation of class conflict, describing it as "a fight for the wealth producers and wealth owners" and calling for a "conscription of wealth". Ferricks campaigned for the "No" vote during the 1916 referendum on overseas service for conscripted soldiers. Following the resulting party split, he regarded pro-conscriptionist ALP prime minister Billy Hughes as having betrayed the labour movement.

== Return to state politics and final years ==
Ferricks returned to the Queensland Legislative Assembly at the 1920 state election, following the retirement of the incumbent Labor member Edgar Free in the seat of South Brisbane. He was re-elected in 1923 and 1926, but lost his seat in the ALP's landslide defeat in 1929. He was defeated by CPNP candidate Neil MacGroarty, with the contest attracting attention as both Ferricks and MacGroarty were Irish Catholics. MacGroarty was the president of the Queensland Irish Association at a time when sectarianism was rife in Australian politics and Irish Catholics were primarily associated with the ALP.

Ferricks was a prominent internal critic of ALP premier Ted Theodore, representing the party's radical wing which viewed Theodore's approach as too cautious. In July 1924 he successfully moved a caucus motion calling for a 44-hour working week, against Theodore's wishes; Theodore and his cabinet offered their resignations but eventually continued in office after further negotiations. When Theodore sought to transfer to federal parliament later in the year, Ferricks unsuccessfully contested the preselection ballot against Theodore for the seat of Herbert, losing by a substantial number of votes.

Ferricks stood unsuccessfully at the 1931 federal election as the ALP candidate in Maranoa. The Worker described his candidacy as "one of the glorious failures of the campaign", as he recorded a swing to Labor despite entering the contest at short notice, with little existing organisation and campaigning inhibited by severe flooding.

== Personal life ==
In 1909, Ferricks married Beatrice Waugh, with whom he had two daughters. Following his parliamentary defeat in 1929 he worked as a travelling salesman for a wine and spirit merchant, but lost his job as a result of the Great Depression.

Ferricks died at his home in Clayfield on 20 August 1932, aged 56, three weeks after suffering a major stroke. His funeral was held at St Stephen's Cathedral which proceeded to Nudgee Cemetery.

Parliament of Queensland
Preceded by Francis Kenna	Member for Bowen; 1909–1912	Succeeded by Edwin Caine
Preceded by Edgar Free	Member for South Brisbane; 1920–1929	Succeeded by Neil MacGroarty
