= Gladstone Central State School, Block B =

Block B of Gladstone Central State School
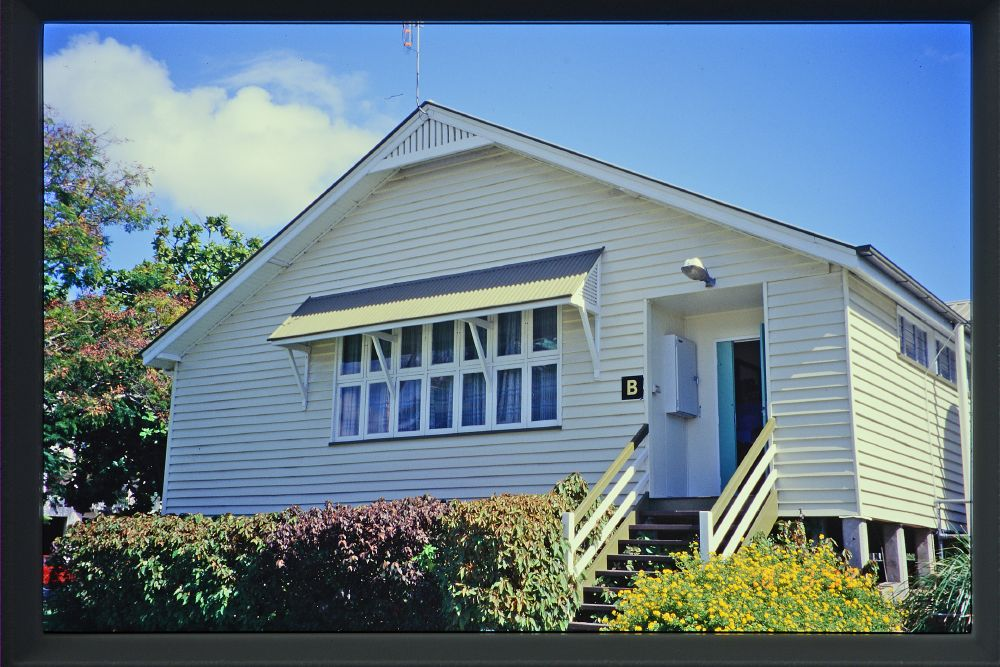
- Block B, 1999

- Location within Queensland Location within Australia
- 23.8416°S 151.2577°E
- Location: 94 Auckland Street, Gladstone, Gladstone Region, Queensland, Australia

History
- Design period: 1840s–1860s (mid-19th century)
- Built: 1904

Site notes
- Architect: Department of Public Works (Queensland)

Queensland Heritage Register
- Official name: Gladstone Central State School, Block B
- Type: state heritage (built)
- Designated: 28 July 2000
- Reference no.: 602001
- Significant period: 1900s (historical); 1900s–1910s (fabric); 1904–ongoing (social)
- Significant components: school/school room
- Builders: J Connors

Block B of Gladstone Central State School is a heritage-listed state school building at 94 Auckland Street, Gladstone, Gladstone Region, Queensland, Australia. It was designed by Department of Public Works (Queensland) and built in 1904 by J Connors. It was added to the Queensland Heritage Register on 28 July 2000.

== History ==
Block B of the Gladstone Central State School was erected in 1904 as the first timber classroom extension to the Gladstone State School, established in the early 1860s.

The town of Gladstone at Port Curtis was founded by the New South Wales colonial government in 1853–1854 prior to the separation of Queensland from New South Wales, and during the 1850s a number of private schools operated in the township. In 1861, following the separation of Queensland, a primary school was established at Gladstone under the provisions of the Queensland Government's Education Act of 1860, which provided government assistance for primary education modelled on the New South Wales system of national (or state-assisted) schools.

At Separation in December 1859, there were only three national schools in Queensland (at Drayton, Warwick and Brisbane), established under New South Wales legislation. The first 7 national schools established in the new colony of Queensland opened in 1861. Among these was the Gladstone Primary School, which opened about April that year.

The Gladstone Primary School initially may have occupied the premises of a former private school conducted from 1859 by JH Carvosso, who was appointed the first national schoolteacher in Gladstone in 1861. A purpose-designed primary school was constructed in 1863–1864 and opened at the beginning of 1864, on the present school reserve. It was a T-shaped brick structure. The front section of the building, facing Auckland Street, was the residence of the school master; behind this, at right angles to the residence, was a long school room to accommodate 70–80 students. Queensland's national school system, administered by the Board of General Education, was replaced in 1875 with a system of free, compulsory, secular education for children aged 6 to 12 years, administered by the Department of Public Instruction. At this time the Gladstone Primary School became the Gladstone State School. By 1879, average attendance at the school had reached 110, and classes were being conducted on the verandahs. To relieve the overcrowding, a separate teacher's residence was erected in 1880–81, and the front section of the 1863 building was remodeled as a classroom.

By 1897, total enrolment was close to 200 and the average attendance had reached 150. The school was again in urgent need of additional classrooms. Extensions were approved by the Department of Public Instruction, but the local community was not able to raise the one-fifth contribution needed to fund the additions until 1904, when a new timber block was erected in front of the 1863 building and connected to it by a covered walkway. Tenders were called in March 1904. The contract was won by J Connors with a price of £437/2/3, and the building was completed by late 1904. Despite a number of modifications, it survives as the present Block B.

In November 1913, the Gladstone State School Committee refused to spend any more money on repairs to the 1863 school building and requested that it be demolished and replaced with a new timber building in keeping with the 1904 wing (Block B). This building (Block A) was erected in 1914–15 and opened in February 1915. In 1917 the 1863 building was sold for £2 for demolition/removal.

By the mid-1930s, Block A had become the High School wing of the Gladstone State School, and two additional timber wings had been erected. One of these accommodated primary school children (Block C), and the other was the Infants School (Block D). In 1936/37 a purpose- designed home economics and manual arts wing was erected (Block E), but there was little further expansion of the school premises until well into the second half of the 20th century. Gladstone State School was renamed Gladstone Central State School on 14 November 1968.

By March 1973, the school had acquired an additional large teaching block (Block G), an administration block (Block H), and a toilet block (Block J - replacing earlier earth closets). At this time plans were drawn for a new Block C, and it appears that the old Block C was removed to another part of the site, and renamed Block F. By 1978, Block A (the 1914–15 building) had been removed and the new Block C had been constructed, but Blocks B, F (the re-sited former Block C), D & E remained.

== Description ==
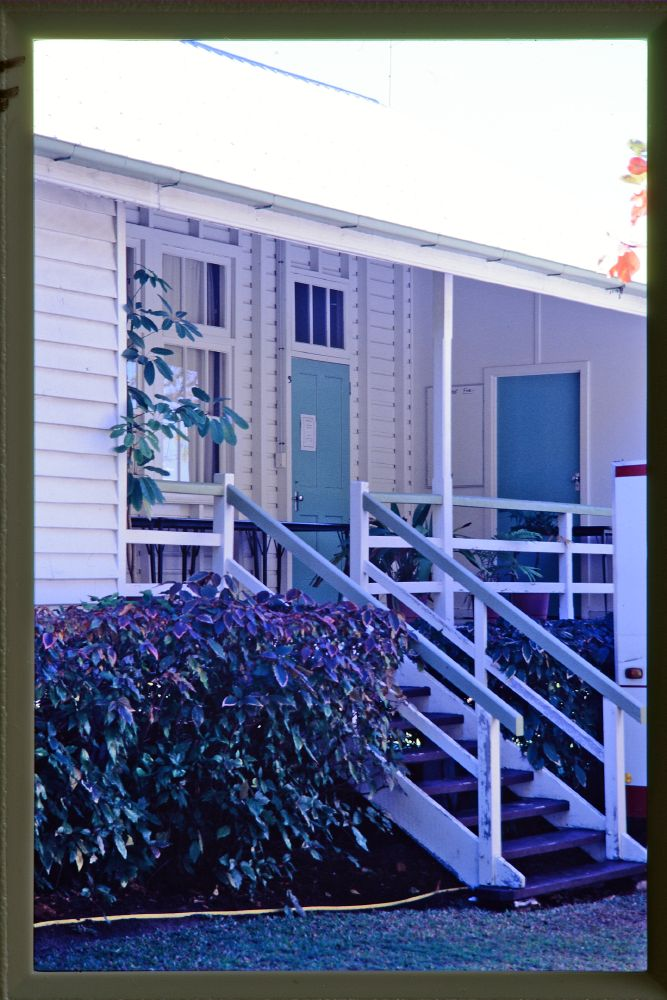
Entrance to Block B, 1999

Situated on a sloping site in the northwest corner of the Gladstone Central State School grounds overlooking Auckland Street, Block B is a free-standing, single-storeyed timber building sitting on low concrete stumps to the east and north and higher concrete stumps to the west and south. The low-pitched gable roof is sheeted with polytex sheeting and has small triangular decorative panels of vertical slats to the north and south gable ends. The exterior is clad with painted weatherboards.

The north and south elevations each have a bank of fourteen awning windows sheltered by a sunshade awning with lattice triangular panels to each end. The south elevation also contains a porch entrance to the east verandah and the north elevation contains two small windows to the west corner. The building is planned about a single room with lateral verandahs. The building has been altered but some original fabric remains including timber linings, doors and windows. The single room has been subdivided with concertina doors to form three rooms and partitioned spaces and enclosures added to the verandahs.

A small, single-room, rectangular, gable-roofed annexe extends from the centre of the east verandah. Clad externally with weatherboards, the annexe has two casement windows to the north and east elevations and the ceiling and interior walls are lined with tongue-and-groove boarding with coved mouldings to the corners and cornice.

The east verandah is enclosed and lined internally with tongue-and- groove boarding and coved mouldings to the corners and cornice. There is a bank of clerestorey louvres to the south of the annexe and three sets of clerestorey and six sets of half height louvres to the north. Rooms to the corners of the verandah have been partitioned with fibro cement sheeting. A plain timber door opens to the annexe. There is a porch entrance to the south and a plain timber door in the east wall to the north of the annexe.

The west verandah is approached by a central set of timber stairs. The corners of the verandah have been enclosed to the north for toilets and to the south for a small kitchen. Both enclosed areas open to the verandah. There are four timber casement windows to the west in the south corner and three timber casements windows to the west in the north corner. The open middle portion of the verandah has a timber handrail and two horizontal midrails and a single stop chamfered verandah post at the top of the stair. The west verandah has exposed stud framing and is lined with chamfer boards. There are three sets of triple sash windows to the centre with timber doors to each side and an additional timber door near the north enclosure. There are tilting fanlights above all doors. The panel and sheeted French doors to north of the windows are stop chamfered to the interior. Tusk tenon joints to the framing of the windows and doors.

The main room has a coved ceiling lined with tongue-and-groove boarding with coved corner mouldings and cornice and exposed timber truss bases. There are winding mechanisms for the tilting fanlights.

== Heritage listing ==
Block B of Gladstone Central State School was listed on the Queensland Heritage Register on 28 July 2000 having satisfied the following criteria.

The place is important in demonstrating the evolution or pattern of Queensland's history.

Block B is significant historically for its association with the important work of primary school education in Gladstone since the early 1900s,

The place has a strong or special association with a particular community or cultural group for social, cultural or spiritual reasons.

Block B has had a special association for generations of Gladstone residents as a place important in their personal histories.
