= Peter Delamothe =

Australian politician

Sir Peter Delamothe OBE
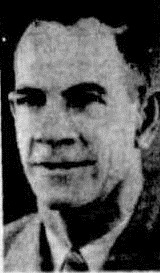

Deputy Leader of the Queensland Liberal Party
- In office 9 June 1967 – 20 December 1971
- Leader: Gordon Chalk
- Preceded by: Alex Dewar
- Succeeded by: William Knox

Attorney-General of Queensland and Minister for Justice
- In office 26 September 1963 – 20 December 1971
- Premier: Frank Nicklin; Jack Pizzey; Gordon Chalk; Joh Bjelke-Petersen
- Preceded by: Alan Munro
- Succeeded by: William Knox

Member of the Queensland Legislative Assembly for Bowen
- In office 28 May 1960 – 19 December 1971
- Preceded by: New seat
- Succeeded by: Seat abolished

Personal details
- Born: Peter Roylance de la Mothe; 29 June 1904 Brisbane, Queensland, Australia
- Died: 26 October 1973 (aged 69) Paddington, London, United Kingdom
- Party: Liberal Party
- Spouse(s): Myrtle Eunice Lois Bussell (m.1931 divorced ?), Joan Patricia Milner (m.1947)
- Education: University of Sydney
- Occupation: Doctor, Ophthalmological surgeon

Military service
- Branch/service: Royal Australian Air Force
- Years of service: 1940–1944
- Rank: Wing Commander

Sir Peter Roylance Delamothe OBE (29 June 1904 – 26 October 1973) was an ophthalmological surgeon and member of the Queensland Legislative Assembly.

== Early years ==
Born Peter Roylance de la Mothe at Spring Hill, Brisbane, to parents Charles Joseph de la Mothe, a chemist who had moved to Australia from France, and his wife Anna Mary (née Oliver), he was educated at St Francis School in Hughenden, and then Mount Carmel College in Charters Towers. Awarded an open scholarship after coming third in the state for his final examinations, Delamothe entered the University of Sydney where he obtained M.B. and B.S. degrees. Between 1927 and 1930, he served as a junior, then senior, resident medical officer at Sydney Hospital, where he also practiced ophthalmological surgery before entering into private practice. It was around this time that he anglicized his name to Delamothe.

By January 1933, Delamothe was back in Queensland and appointed as the medical superintendent of the Collinsville hospital. Known for his hard work, he performed seventy-seven operations in his first seven weeks there, which greatly increased the hospital's popularity with the local population. In early 1936, he moved to Bowen and set up his own practice.

On 26 October 1940, Delamothe joined the Royal Australian Air Force as a probationary flight lieutenant and was based at several different hospitals and medical receiving stations. By October 1944 he had been promoted to the rank of temporary wing commander and was transferred to the reserves.

== Political career ==
In 1939, Delamothe stood as an independent for the mayoralty of Bowen but was unsuccessful. After World War II, he once again stood for the position at the 1946 council elections and this time was successful and went on to serve for twelve years. During this time he carried on with his medical practice and at one stage locating his surgery in the municipal chambers. Delamothe fought hard for the construction of a major highway diversion to Bowen but his efforts proved fruitless. He oversaw the start of a sewerage system for the town and the first co-ordinated attempts made to attract tourists to the region.

In April 1958, Bowen was hit by a cyclone, destroying most of the town. As the cyclone was at it worst, Mayor Delamothe was performing surgery by torchlight on a critically ill patient at the local hospital, which had already lost its roof.

Delamothe accepted the Liberal nomination for the resurrected electorate of Bowen at the 1960 state elections and went on to win the seat, holding it until it was abolished in 1971. Within three years of entering the parliament he was appointed Minister for Justice and Attorney-General, holding the role until his retirement from politics in December 1971. From June 1967, Delamothe was also the Deputy Leader of the Queensland Liberal Party.

During his time as Minister for Justice and Attorney-General, Delamothe acted to ease the backlog of cases in Queensland courts, and helped establish the Law Reform Commission and the Legal Aid Bureau. He introduced weekend detention and work-release programs for minor offenders and reduced prison overcrowding by convincing the government to carry out an extensive building program.

Delamothe reformed Queensland's alcohol laws, enabling Brisbane hotels to remain open on Sundays and for the first time women were allowed into the public bar. He was also responsible for introducing the state's first consumer protection laws.

On 20 December 1971, the day after his retirement from parliament, Delamothe took up an appointment as the Queensland Agent-General in London. He held the role until serious illness forced his resignation in September 1973.

== Personal life ==
At a Methodist Church in Sydney Delamothe married Myrtle Eunice Lois Bussell on 23 April 1931. Her father was Henry Lytton Bussell a miller who established the business H.L. Bussell & Co in Chippendale and manufactured flour products under the White Wings brand. Her brother was Leading Aircraftman Kent Bligh Bussell who died in an RAAF air collision in Temora in 1942. Delamothe and his first wife had four sons. Following their divorce his former wife lived by the name of Myrta Clifton-Bligh returning to her family home Eisnath in Ashfield. She brought up their four sons on her own and died aged 100 in 2005. Their sons Colonel John Clifton-Bligh of the 14th/20th King's Hussars died aged 71 in 2011, Rupert Peter Clifton-Bligh died aged 83 in 2016 and Lawerence Robert Clifton-Bligh died aged 89 in 2024. Their youngest son Phillip Clifton-Bligh is a retired endocrinologist and still lives in Sydney. Delamothe married Joan Patricia Milner at the Australian Inland Mission Hall in Broome, Western Australia on 17 May 1947. This union was to produce a son and two daughters.

In 1959 he was appointed an Officer of the Order of the British Empire (OBE), and he was knighted in June 1973. Delamothe died of cancer at St Mary's Hospital in Paddington, London in October 1973. He was cremated and his ashes scattered on Bowen harbour.

Parliament of Queensland
New seat	Member for Bowen; 1960–1971	Abolished
