= Charles Collins (Queensland politician) =

Australian miner, trade union organiser and politician

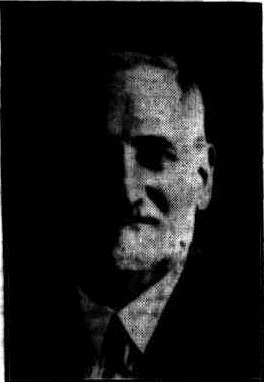

Member of the Queensland Legislative Assembly for Burke
- In office 2 October 1909 – 27 April 1912
- Preceded by: William Maxwell
- Succeeded by: William Murphy

Member of the Queensland Legislative Assembly for Bowen
- In office 22 May 1915 – 28 March 1936
- Preceded by: Edwin Caine
- Succeeded by: Ernest Riordan

Personal details
- Born: Charles Collins; 25 September 1867 Willey, Warwickshire, England
- Died: 28 March 1936 (aged 68) Brisbane, Queensland, Australia
- Resting place: Toowong Cemetery
- Party: Labour
- Spouse(s): Sarah Jane McTaggart (née Browne) (m.1892 d.1911), Annie Gierke, (m.1914 d.1960)
- Occupation: Miner, Trade union organiser

Charles Collins (25 September 1867 – 28 March 1936) was a miner, trade union organiser, and member of the Queensland Legislative Assembly.

== Early life ==
Collins was born at Willey, Warwickshire, to parents Henry Collins and his wife Lizabeth (née Smith) and was educated at Willey Church of England Village School. He arrived in Maryborough, Queensland in 1883 and worked on the sugar plantations around the Antigua and Pialba regions before moving to Gympie in 1884.

Two years later, Collins was in the Kimberley region of Western Australia for the gold rush but, after visiting the Northern Territory, he was back in Gympie to carry on gold mining.

== Political career ==
Collins was a member of the Political and Amalgamated Miners Association and in 1908 was a general organizer for the Australian Labor Federation and an organizer for the Australian Workers' Union in the North Queensland area from 1912 to 1915.

Collins, representing the Labour Party, was a candidate for the seat of Burke at the 1909 state election. He defeated the sitting Ministerialist member, William Maxwell but was lost his seat in 1912 to the Independent candidate, William Murphy.

At the 1915 state election, Collins stood for the seat of Bowen and defeated the sitting member, Edwin Caine. Collins went on to hold the seat until his death 21 years later. During his service in parliament, he was a member of the Public Works Committee.

== Personal life ==
On the 10 Dec 1892, Collins married Sarah Jane McTaggart (née Browne), the widow of Hugh McTaggart, and together had four children. Sarah died in 1911 and three years later he married Annie Gierke and they had two children.

After a long illness, Collins died at Brisbane in March 1936. His Funeral moved from his former residence at Lamington Terrace, Dutton Park, to the Toowong Cemetery.

Parliament of Queensland
Preceded by William Maxwell	Member for Burke; 1909–1912	Succeeded by William Murphy
Preceded by Edwin Caine	Member for Bowen; 1915–1936	Succeeded by Ernest Riordan
