= Ernest Riordan =

Australian politician (1901–1954)

The Hon Ernest "Dick" Riordan
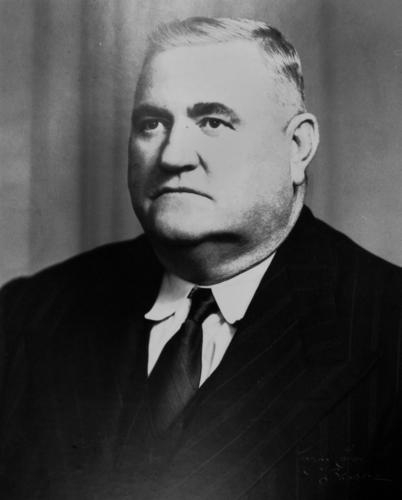

Member of the Queensland Legislative Assembly for Bowen
- In office 20 June 1936 – 15 April 1944
- Preceded by: Charles Collins
- Succeeded by: Fred Paterson

Member of the Queensland Legislative Assembly for Flinders
- In office 29 April 1950 – 9 December 1954
- Preceded by: New seat
- Succeeded by: Frank Forde

Personal details
- Born: Ernest Joseph Riordan; 21 September 1901 Mareeba, Queensland, Australia
- Died: 9 December 1953 (aged 52) Brisbane, Queensland, Australia
- Resting place: Lutwyche Cemetery
- Party: Labor
- Spouse: Violet Alice Locke (m.1930 d.1993)
- Relations: Darby Riordan (brother), Jim Riordan, (brother), Bill Riordan (nephew)
- Occupation: Cane cutter, Navvy, Miner, Wharf labourer

Ernest Joseph "Dick" Riordan (21 September 1901 – 9 December 1954) was a Miner, Wharf labourer, and member of the Queensland Legislative Assembly.

== Early years ==
Riordan was born at Mareeba, Queensland, to parents William Riordan and his wife Mary (née Walsh) and was educated at state schools in both Chillagoe and Cairns. When he left school he worked as a meatworker, miner and cane-cutter. He spent about eight years working on the wharves in Bowen, ending up as secretary of the Waterside Workers' Federation.

== Political career ==
Riordan first entered politics as an alderman on the Town of Bowen council. In March 1936, the member for the state seat of Bowen, Charles Collins, died and a by-election was held on the 20 June of that year. Riordan was nominated as the Labor Party candidate and went on to win the seat over John Smith of the Country Party. He held the seat for eight years before surprisingly losing to Fred Paterson of the Communist Party at the 1944 state election.

After losing his seat, Riordan found work as a field officer for the State Employment Council and in 1947 he was the private secretary to his nephew, Bill Riordan, who was the Minister for the Navy in the Second Chifley Ministry.

At the 1950 state election, Riordan stood for the reincarnated seat of Flinders, defeating the Country Party candidate, Mr G. H. Stuart by 297 votes. He held the seat unopposed in 1953, and remained the member until his death the next year.

During his time in Parliament, Riordan was Temporary Chairman of Committees on four occasions between 1941 and 1952, Government Whip from 17 December 1942 until 14 April 1944, and Secretary for Mines and Immigration from 10 March 1952 until his death.

== Personal life ==
On 5 May 1930, Collins married Violet Alice Locke (died 1993), and together had ten daughters. Along with his Nephew, Bill Riordan, Ernest Riordan had two brothers who were also members of the Queensland Parliament. Darby Riordan was the member for Kennedy in the Federal Parliament and the state member for Burke, while Jim Riordan was a member of the Queensland Legislative Council between 1917 and 1922.

After suffering from illness for several months, Riordan was granted six months leave from Cabinet duties in November 1954 but died at his Ashgrove home less than a month later. He was accorded a state funeral which was held on 11 December 1954 at St. Stephen's Cathedral and proceeded to the Lutwyche Cemetery.

Parliament of Queensland
Preceded by Charles Collins	Member for Bowen; 1936–1944	Succeeded by Fred Paterson
New seat	Member for Flinders; 1950–1954	Succeeded by Frank Forde
