= Fred Paterson =

Australian politician (1897–1977)

Fred Paterson MLA
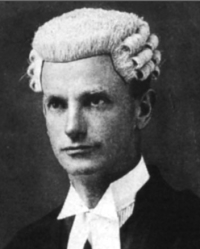

Member of the Queensland Parliament for Bowen
- In office 15 April 1944 – 27 March 1950
- Preceded by: Ernest Riordan
- Succeeded by: Seat abolished

Alderman of the Townsville City Council
- In office 1939–1944

Member of the Gladstone Town Council
- In office April 1927 – November 1928

Personal details
- Born: Frederick Woolnough Paterson; 13 June 1897 Gladstone, Queensland, Australia
- Died: 7 October 1977 (aged 80) Concord, New South Wales, Australia
- Party: Communist (1923–1926; 1930–1977)
- Other political affiliations: Labor (1923–1926)
- Height: 175 cm (5 ft 9 in)
- Spouse(s): Lucy Ethel Blackman (m. 1924–1931; divorced); Kathleen Claire (m. 1932–1977; his death)
- Children: 2
- Education: Gladstone State School, Rockhampton Grammar School, Brisbane Grammar School
- Alma mater: University of Queensland (BA); Merton College, Oxford (BA)
- Profession: Barrister
- Nickname: Red Fred

Military service
- Allegiance: Australia
- Branch/service: Australian Army
- Years of service: 1918–1919
- Unit: Imperial Force
- Battles/wars: World War I

Frederick Woolnough Paterson (13 June 1897 – 7 October 1977) was an Australian politician, activist, unionist and lawyer. He is the only representative of the Communist Party of Australia to be elected to an Australian parliament.

In 1949 he was described as "[b]alding, sallow faced, slight and wiry, with the quavering voice of an old man, Paterson is a non-drinker, non-smoker, non-gambler, non-swearer".

== Early history ==
Paterson was born and raised on a pig farm in Gladstone, Queensland. He was educated at Gladstone State School, came second in the annual bursary examination at 13 years of age, Rockhampton Grammar School, and Brisbane Grammar School and then studied classics at the University of Queensland, before joining the military in 1918. He subsequently saw action on the battlefields of France, returning in 1919. While in France, he was involved in two food-related strikes, which were both successful. On return he completed his studies.

In January 1920, Paterson moved to Merton College, Oxford to study theology, after becoming a Rhodes Scholar. However, by the time he sat for his honours degree in 1922, his belief in Christianity had changed. He had witnessed extreme poverty in Ireland and parts of London, and this concerned him. Not long after returning to Queensland, Paterson joined the Communist Party of Australia.

He also had an interest in sporting, having come second in two-miles amateur championships in Queensland, aged 16, and 440 yards (400 m) championship, aged 20, represented his university in the Brisbane senior competition football, and represented Queensland returned soldiers against an AIF touring team.

Paterson began studying law in 1923. By 1924, he was giving lectures on Marxism. Then, in 1925, he began working for the Workers' Educational Association. This saw him addressing unions, giving lectures on the history of the working-class, and trying to increase the association's membership.

== Politics and the Communist Party ==
In 1931, Paterson was admitted to the New South Wales Bar. He based himself in Brisbane, but later that year went to Townsville to defend two Italian workers, who had been charged with assaulting the Italian consul.

As the Great Depression set in, Paterson became involved in fighting racist employment policies in the sugar industry. At the time, the unions and employer associations had a policy of refusing employment to Italian workers to combat unemployment in the industry. Paterson led a campaign by both the Communist Party and the Italian community and was successful in ending the practice. In 1933, Paterson left Brisbane completely, and set up in Townsville. He spent his time juggling both a part-time legal career and his burgeoning role as a travelling activist for the Communist Party. By this time, he had gained a reputation as a fine public speaker.

In April 1934, Paterson was nominated by the Communist Party as their candidate for mayor of Brisbane but he was easily defeated by Alfred James Jones, the Labor candidate.

During the late 1930s, the Communist Party continued to grow rapidly in North Queensland, with Paterson at the forefront. He played a significant role in the union movement in the sugar industry during a key strike over workplace conditions, and became involved in the anti-fascist movement.

In 1939, Paterson stood successfully as an alderman for the Townsville City Council, becoming the first member of the Communist Party to win such an office in Australia. In August 1940 he stood as an independent socialist for the federal seat of Herbert. He was then re-elected to council in 1943. The same year, he stood for the federal seat of Herbert, but was defeated.

=== Member for Bowen (1944–1950) ===
The next year, he again made history, when at his third attempt, he won the State electoral seat of Bowen at the 1944 Queensland state election. While Paterson had polled slightly behind his rival in Bowen itself, he was far in front in the mining and sugar-farming areas, which resulted in a significant victory. He retained the seat at the following election.

During his time in parliament, Paterson advocated for a "socialist post-war reconstruction" aimed at achieving full employment. These policies included increasing nurse salaries, the implementation of the 40 hour work week into law, equal pay for women, capping rents in relation to the average income, and abolishing child labor on farms. Paterson also advocated for free publicly owned and managed housing, child care, nurseries, playgrounds, pharmaceuticals and hospitals, and the introduction of free education from kindergarten to "the highest level at university". These public institutions would have been established through widespread nationalisation. He also advocated for the nationalisation of most key industries in Australia.

== Demonstrations ==
After being elected to Parliament, Paterson largely gave up the law, to concentrate on his political career. He continued being actively involved in public issues, particularly through the union movement, and was a vocal critic of the government of the time. He often made speeches at the Domain in central Brisbane. Paterson was rewarded, retaining his seat at the 1947 state election. During the 1948 railway strike, he regularly joined the picket line in the mornings before going to sit in Parliament. He also gave the picketers legal advice. Paterson knew that the police had the power to order the picketers to move, but that they did not have the power to order them where exactly to move. He then devised a strategy where, as they were moved on by the police, the picketers simply moved around the block.

During a demonstration in Brisbane, on 17 March 1948, Paterson intervened when a police officer began to assault a demonstrator near Central station. Paterson was himself then struck from behind by another officer, and was rushed to hospital in an ambulance, unconscious. Paterson was unable to do any political activity for some months afterwards. An inquiry into the incident found that no wrongdoing had occurred and no police officer was ever arrested or charged with the assault. The ex-Queensland police officer and former Labor leader Bill Hayden later named the officer as sergeant Jack Mahony, who had boasted about using a pick handle on "the 'Commie' Fred Paterson" during Hayden's time as an officer.

While Paterson was recovering, the Queensland branch of the veterans organisation Returned and Services League of Australia (RSL) expelled him for being a Communist. However, his return to Townsville, once he had sufficiently recovered from his injuries to travel, was widely celebrated.

== End of political career ==
In a 1949 redistribution, Paterson's electorate of Bowen was abolished, and split between two new electorates: Burdekin and Whitsunday. Historian Ross Fitzgerald suggests that the redistribution was done deliberately to split Paterson's electoral support and prevent him from being returned to parliament in the 1950 election. Paterson contested the election in Whitsunday, but lost to Country Party candidate Lloyd Roberts.

Paterson's defeat at the 1950 election largely ended his political career. At the time, Prime Minister Robert Menzies was launching his anti-Communist campaign, and introducing legislation to prevent Communists from holding public office. Paterson was involved in the successful campaign against Menzies' anti-Communist measures together with Max Julius, and he continued to be involved in the union movement and Communist Party right up until his death in 1977. He also served as the leading council for the Communist Party in the Royal Commission Inquiring into the Origins, Aims, Objects and Funds of the Communist Party in Victoria and Other Related Matters in 1949.

Paterson and fellow communist Gilbert Burns were constantly the subject of surveillance by the federal security service more correctly known as the Commonwealth Security Service (CSS). The Brisbane office of the CSS was run by Bob Wake.

== See also ==
- Members of the Queensland Legislative Assembly, 1944–1947
- Members of the Queensland Legislative Assembly, 1947–1950

Parliament of Queensland
Preceded by Ernest Riordan	Member for Bowen; 1944–1950	Abolished
