= Electoral results for the district of Nundah =

Queensland, Australia, district election results

This is a list of election results for the electoral district of Nundah in Queensland state elections.

== Members for Nundah ==
| Member | Party | Term |
|---|---|---|
| George Agnew | Conservative | 1888–1890 |
| George Agnew | Ministerial | 1890–1896 |
| Thomas Bridges | Ministerial | 1896–1903 |
| Thomas Bridges | Liberal | 1903–1907 |
| Thomas Bridges | Kidstonites | 1907 |
| Richard Sumner | Kidstonites | 1907–1909 |
| Richard Sumner | Independent Opposition | 1909 |
| Thomas Bridges | Liberal | 1909–1916 |
| Thomas Bridges | National | 1916–1918 |
| Hubert Sizer | National | 1918–1923 |
| William Kelso | United Party | 1923–1925 |
| William Kelso | Country and Progressive National | 1925–1932 |
| John Hayes | Labor | 1932–1947 |
| Frank Roberts | Labor | 1947–1956 |
| Jim Hadley | Labor | 1956–1957 |
| Jim Hadley | Queensland Labor | 1957–1957 |
| William Knox | Liberal | 1957–1989 |
| Phil Heath | Labor | 1989–1991 |
| Terry Sullivan | Labor | 1991–1992 |

== Election results ==
=== Elections in the 1990s ===
1991 Nundah state by-election
| Party | Candidate | Votes | % | ±% |
|---|---|---|---|---|
| Labor | Terry Sullivan | 7,100 | 43.6 | −13.8 |
| Liberal | John Hood | 5,474 | 33.6 | −0.5 |
| Independent | John Hay | 1,158 | 7.1 | +7.1 |
| National | Yvonne Chapman | 1,010 | 6.2 | −2.3 |
| Independent | Ray Hugall | 536 | 3.3 | +3.3 |
| Democrats | Ian Rowland | 393 | 2.4 | +2.4 |
| Call to Australia | Rona Joyner | 349 | 2.1 | +2.1 |
| Independent | Ronald Nightingale | 276 | 1.7 | +1.7 |
| Total formal votes | | 16,296 | 96.7 | −0.9 |
| Informal votes | | 558 | 3.3 | +0.9 |
| Turnout | | 16,854 | 83.3 | −8.2 |
Two-party-preferred result
| Labor | Terry Sullivan | 8,208 | 50.4 | −7.6 |
| Liberal | John Hood | 8,088 | 49.6 | +7.6 |
| Labor hold | | Swing | −7.6 | |

=== Elections in the 1980s ===
1989 Queensland state election: Nundah
| Party | Candidate | Votes | % | ±% |
|---|---|---|---|---|
| Labor | Phil Heath | 10,443 | 57.4 | +13.9 |
| Liberal | William Knox | 6,201 | 34.1 | +0.5 |
| National | Russell Parry | 1,548 | 8.5 | −14.3 |
| Total formal votes | | 18,192 | 97.6 | −0.6 |
| Informal votes | | 450 | 2.4 | +0.6 |
| Turnout | | 18,642 | 91.5 | −0.6 |
Two-party-preferred result
| Labor | Phil Heath | 10,551 | 58.0 | +13.4 |
| Liberal | William Knox | 7,641 | 42.0 | −13.4 |
| Labor gain from Liberal | | Swing | +13.4 | |

1986 Queensland state election: Nundah
| Party | Candidate | Votes | % | ±% |
|---|---|---|---|---|
| Labor | Gary Johns | 7,627 | 43.5 | −2.8 |
| Liberal | William Knox | 5,894 | 33.7 | −20.0 |
| National | Goodwin Poole | 3,996 | 22.8 | +22.8 |
| Total formal votes | | 17,517 | 98.2 | |
| Informal votes | | 316 | 1.8 | |
| Turnout | | 17,833 | 92.1 | |
Two-party-preferred result
| Liberal | William Knox | 9,702 | 55.4 | +1.7 |
| Labor | Gary Johns | 7,815 | 44.6 | −1.7 |
| Liberal hold | | Swing | +1.7 | |

1983 Queensland state election: Nundah
| Party | Candidate | Votes | % | ±% |
|---|---|---|---|---|
| Liberal | William Knox | 7,999 | 56.2 | −3.4 |
| Labor | Owen Gazzard | 6,237 | 43.8 | +3.4 |
| Total formal votes | | 14,236 | 98.2 | −0.1 |
| Informal votes | | 262 | 1.8 | +0.1 |
| Turnout | | 14,498 | 90.7 | +2.6 |
| Liberal hold | | Swing | −3.4 | |

1980 Queensland state election: Nundah
| Party | Candidate | Votes | % | ±% |
|---|---|---|---|---|
| Liberal | William Knox | 8,237 | 59.6 | +1.5 |
| Labor | Owen Gazzard | 5,587 | 40.4 | −1.5 |
| Total formal votes | | 13,824 | 98.3 | +0.1 |
| Informal votes | | 232 | 1.7 | −0.1 |
| Turnout | | 14,056 | 88.1 | −2.9 |
| Liberal hold | | Swing | +1.5 | |

=== Elections in the 1970s ===
1977 Queensland state election: Nundah
| Party | Candidate | Votes | % | ±% |
|---|---|---|---|---|
| Liberal | William Knox | 8,235 | 58.1 | −9.1 |
| Labor | Leonard Hingley | 5,927 | 41.9 | +9.1 |
| Total formal votes | | 14,162 | 98.2 | |
| Informal votes | | 259 | 1.8 | |
| Turnout | | 14,421 | 91.0 | |
| Liberal hold | | Swing | −9.1 | |

1974 Queensland state election: Nundah
| Party | Candidate | Votes | % | ±% |
|---|---|---|---|---|
| Liberal | William Knox | 7,645 | 63.8 | +16.5 |
| Labor | Leonard Hingley | 4,337 | 36.2 | −9.0 |
| Total formal votes | | 11,982 | 98.2 | −0.8 |
| Informal votes | | 219 | 1.8 | +0.8 |
| Turnout | | 12,201 | 88.5 | −5.3 |
| Liberal hold | | Swing | +9.9 | |

1972 Queensland state election: Nundah
| Party | Candidate | Votes | % | ±% |
|---|---|---|---|---|
| Liberal | William Knox | 5,341 | 47.3 | −1.9 |
| Labor | Ian Brusasco | 5,100 | 45.2 | +4.9 |
| Queensland Labor | Ambrose Shannon | 853 | 7.5 | −3.1 |
| Total formal votes | | 11,294 | 99.0 | |
| Informal votes | | 115 | 1.0 | |
| Turnout | | 11,409 | 93.8 | |
Two-party-preferred result
| Liberal | William Knox | 6,092 | 53.9 | −5.5 |
| Labor | Ian Brusasco | 5,202 | 46.1 | +5.5 |
| Liberal hold | | Swing | −5.5 | |

=== Elections in the 1960s ===
1969 Queensland state election: Nundah
| Party | Candidate | Votes | % | ±% |
|---|---|---|---|---|
| Liberal | William Knox | 5,471 | 49.2 | −2.5 |
| Labor | Roderick Blundell | 4,479 | 40.3 | +0.4 |
| Queensland Labor | Brian Barlow | 1,178 | 10.6 | +2.2 |
| Total formal votes | | 11,128 | 98.4 | −0.4 |
| Informal votes | | 175 | 1.6 | +0.4 |
| Turnout | | 11,303 | 92.3 | −0.8 |
Two-party-preferred result
| Liberal | William Knox | 6,322 | 56.8 | −1.8 |
| Labor | Roderick Blundell | 4,806 | 43.2 | +1.8 |
| Liberal hold | | Swing | −1.8 | |

1966 Queensland state election: Nundah
| Party | Candidate | Votes | % | ±% |
|---|---|---|---|---|
| Liberal | William Knox | 5,971 | 51.7 | +1.9 |
| Labor | John Carey | 4,599 | 39.9 | −0.6 |
| Queensland Labor | Michael Green | 972 | 8.4 | −1.3 |
| Total formal votes | | 11,542 | 98.8 | −0.1 |
| Informal votes | | 145 | 1.2 | +0.1 |
| Turnout | | 11,687 | 93.1 | −1.6 |
Two-party-preferred result
| Liberal | William Knox | 6,762 | 58.6 | +0.3 |
| Labor | John Carey | 4,780 | 41.4 | −0.3 |
| Liberal hold | | Swing | +0.3 | |

1963 Queensland state election: Nundah
| Party | Candidate | Votes | % | ±% |
|---|---|---|---|---|
| Liberal | William Knox | 5,860 | 49.8 | −2.2 |
| Labor | Frank Roberts | 4,763 | 40.5 | +8.3 |
| Queensland Labor | Denis Cleary | 1,144 | 9.7 | −6.1 |
| Total formal votes | | 11,767 | 98.9 | +0.4 |
| Informal votes | | 132 | 1.1 | −0.4 |
| Turnout | | 11,899 | 94.7 | +1.7 |
Two-party-preferred result
| Liberal | William Knox | 6,861 | 58.3 | |
| Labor | Frank Roberts | 4,906 | 41.7 | |
| Liberal hold | | Swing | N/A | |

1960 Queensland state election: Nundah
| Party | Candidate | Votes | % | ±% |
|---|---|---|---|---|
| Liberal | William Knox | 6,148 | 52.0 | |
| Labor | Michael Sweeney | 3,808 | 32.2 | |
| Queensland Labor | Jim Hadley | 1,873 | 15.8 | |
| Total formal votes | | 11,829 | 98.5 | |
| Informal votes | | 178 | 1.5 | |
| Turnout | | 12,007 | 93.0 | |
| Liberal hold | | Swing | | |

=== Elections in the 1950s ===
1957 Queensland state election: Nundah
| Party | Candidate | Votes | % | ±% |
|---|---|---|---|---|
| Liberal | William Knox | 4,421 | 39.3 | −5.2 |
| Queensland Labor | Jim Hadley | 3,526 | 31.3 | +31.3 |
| Labor | Dudley Ryder | 3,307 | 29.4 | −26.1 |
| Total formal votes | | 11,254 | 98.9 | +0.4 |
| Informal votes | | 124 | 1.1 | −0.4 |
| Turnout | | 11,378 | 95.4 | +0.6 |
| Liberal gain from Labor | | Swing | N/A | |

1956 Queensland state election: Nundah
| Party | Candidate | Votes | % | ±% |
|---|---|---|---|---|
| Labor | Jim Hadley | 6,136 | 55.5 | −6.4 |
| Liberal | William Knox | 4,924 | 44.5 | +6.4 |
| Total formal votes | | 11,060 | 98.5 | −0.1 |
| Informal votes | | 166 | 1.5 | +0.1 |
| Turnout | | 11,226 | 94.8 | +0.3 |
| Labor hold | | Swing | −6.4 | |

1953 Queensland state election: Nundah
| Party | Candidate | Votes | % | ±% |
|---|---|---|---|---|
| Labor | Frank Roberts | 6,882 | 61.9 | +9.6 |
| Liberal | Nellie Taylor | 4,232 | 38.1 | −9.6 |
| Total formal votes | | 11,114 | 98.6 | −0.3 |
| Informal votes | | 162 | 1.4 | +0.3 |
| Turnout | | 11,276 | 94.5 | +0.7 |
| Labor hold | | Swing | +9.6 | |

1950 Queensland state election: Nundah
| Party | Candidate | Votes | % | ±% |
|---|---|---|---|---|
| Labor | Frank Roberts | 5,624 | 52.3 | |
| Liberal | William Cook | 5,122 | 47.7 | |
| Total formal votes | | 10,746 | 98.9 | |
| Informal votes | | 123 | 1.1 | |
| Turnout | | 10,869 | 93.8 | |
| Labor hold | | Swing | | |

=== Elections in the 1940s ===
1947 Queensland state election: Nundah
| Party | Candidate | Votes | % | ±% |
|---|---|---|---|---|
| Labor | Frank Roberts | 7,128 | 50.8 | −0.8 |
| People's Party | Alex Dewar | 6,893 | 49.2 | +0.8 |
| Total formal votes | | 14,021 | 98.8 | −0.1 |
| Informal votes | | 165 | 1.2 | +0.1 |
| Turnout | | 14,186 | 93.4 | +3.0 |
| Labor hold | | Swing | −0.8 | |

1944 Queensland state election: Nundah
| Party | Candidate | Votes | % | ±% |
|---|---|---|---|---|
| Labor | John Hayes | 5,862 | 51.6 | −1.7 |
| People's Party | William Cunningham | 5,493 | 48.4 | +1.7 |
| Total formal votes | | 11,355 | 98.9 | +0.5 |
| Informal votes | | 125 | 1.1 | −0.5 |
| Turnout | | 11,480 | 90.4 | −3.1 |
| Labor hold | | Swing | −1.7 | |

1941 Queensland state election: Nundah
| Party | Candidate | Votes | % | ±% |
|---|---|---|---|---|
| Labor | John Hayes | 5,672 | 53.3 | +13.6 |
| United Australia | William Cook | 4,972 | 46.7 | +21.2 |
| Total formal votes | | 10,644 | 98.4 | −0.6 |
| Informal votes | | 175 | 1.6 | +0.6 |
| Turnout | | 10,819 | 93.5 | −2.4 |
| Labor hold | | Swing | +0.1 | |

=== Elections in the 1930s ===
1938 Queensland state election: Nundah
| Party | Candidate | Votes | % | ±% |
|---|---|---|---|---|
| Labor | John Hayes | 5,014 | 48.4 | −18.1 |
| Protestant Labour | Thomas Denovan | 2,707 | 26.1 | +26.1 |
| United Australia | William Kelso | 2,644 | 25.5 | −8.0 |
| Total formal votes | | 10,365 | 99.0 | +0.1 |
| Informal votes | | 101 | 1.0 | −0.1 |
| Turnout | | 10,466 | 95.9 | +2.1 |
Two-candidate-preferred result
| Labor | John Hayes | 5,167 | 53.2 | −13.3 |
| Protestant Labour | Thomas Denovan | 4,544 | 46.8 | +46.8 |
| Labor hold | | Swing | N/A | |

1935 Queensland state election: Nundah
| Party | Candidate | Votes | % | ±% |
|---|---|---|---|---|
| Labor | John Hayes | 6,066 | 66.5 | |
| CPNP | Alfred Thompson | 3,059 | 33.5 | |
| Total formal votes | | 9,125 | 98.9 | |
| Informal votes | | 102 | 1.1 | |
| Turnout | | 9,227 | 93.8 | |
| Labor hold | | Swing | | |

1932 Queensland state election: Nundah
| Party | Candidate | Votes | % | ±% |
|---|---|---|---|---|
| Labor | John Hayes | 4,493 | 51.2 | |
| CPNP | William Kelso | 3,933 | 44.8 | |
| Independent | Jack MacDonald | 358 | 4.1 | |
| Total formal votes | | 8,784 | 99.4 | |
| Informal votes | | 56 | 0.6 | |
| Turnout | | 8,840 | 94.0 | |
| Labor gain from CPNP | | Swing | | |

=== Elections in the 1920s ===
1929 Queensland state election: Nundah
| Party | Candidate | Votes | % | ±% |
|---|---|---|---|---|
| CPNP | William Kelso | 6,754 | 67.1 | +7.9 |
| Labor | Thomas Darby | 3,315 | 32.9 | −7.9 |
| Total formal votes | | 10,069 | 99.1 | 0.0 |
| Informal votes | | 88 | 0.9 | 0.0 |
| Turnout | | 10,157 | 93.4 | +0.7 |
| CPNP hold | | Swing | +7.9 | |

1926 Queensland state election: Nundah
| Party | Candidate | Votes | % | ±% |
|---|---|---|---|---|
| CPNP | William Kelso | 4,860 | 59.2 | +2.5 |
| Labor | Victor Kearney | 3,353 | 40.8 | −2.5 |
| Total formal votes | | 8,213 | 99.1 | +0.3 |
| Informal votes | | 76 | 0.9 | −0.3 |
| Turnout | | 8,289 | 92.7 | +4.9 |
| CPNP hold | | Swing | +2.5 | |

1923 Queensland state election: Nundah
| Party | Candidate | Votes | % | ±% |
|---|---|---|---|---|
| United | William Kelso | 3,659 | 56.7 | −5.8 |
| Labor | James McCabe | 2,492 | 38.6 | +1.1 |
| Independent | Thomas Shaw | 298 | 4.7 | +4.7 |
| Total formal votes | | 6,449 | 98.8 | −0.6 |
| Informal votes | | 77 | 1.2 | +0.6 |
| Turnout | | 6,526 | 87.8 | +3.2 |
| United hold | | Swing | N/A | |

1920 Queensland state election: Nundah
| Party | Candidate | Votes | % | ±% |
|---|---|---|---|---|
| National | Hubert Sizer | 5,727 | 62.5 | +4.9 |
| Labor | George Robbins | 3,430 | 37.5 | −4.9 |
| Total formal votes | | 9,157 | 99.4 | +0.1 |
| Informal votes | | 51 | 0.6 | −0.1 |
| Turnout | | 9,208 | 84.6 | −0.1 |
| National hold | | Swing | +4.9 | |

=== Elections in the 1910s ===
1918 Queensland state election: Nundah
| Party | Candidate | Votes | % | ±% |
|---|---|---|---|---|
| National | Hubert Sizer | 4,327 | 57.6 | +5.9 |
| Labor | Sid Cook | 3,186 | 42.4 | −5.9 |
| Total formal votes | | 7,513 | 99.3 | +0.3 |
| Informal votes | | 51 | 0.7 | −0.3 |
| Turnout | | 7,564 | 84.7 | −4.2 |
| National hold | | Swing | +5.9 | |

1915 Queensland state election: Nundah
| Party | Candidate | Votes | % | ±% |
|---|---|---|---|---|
| Liberal | Thomas Bridges | 2,830 | 51.7 | −13.4 |
| Labor | Richard Sumner | 2,640 | 48.3 | +13.4 |
| Total formal votes | | 5,470 | 99.0 | −0.5 |
| Informal votes | | 57 | 1.0 | +0.5 |
| Turnout | | 5,527 | 88.9 | +9.0 |
| Liberal hold | | Swing | −13.4 | |

1912 Queensland state election: Nundah
| Party | Candidate | Votes | % | ±% |
|---|---|---|---|---|
| Liberal | Thomas Bridges | 2,301 | 65.1 | |
| Labor | Robert McCormack | 1,232 | 34.9 | |
| Total formal votes | | 3,533 | 99.5 | |
| Informal votes | | 17 | 0.5 | |
| Turnout | | 3,550 | 79.9 | |
| Liberal hold | | Swing | | |
