= Petronel White =

Australian women's rights campaigner and local government councillor

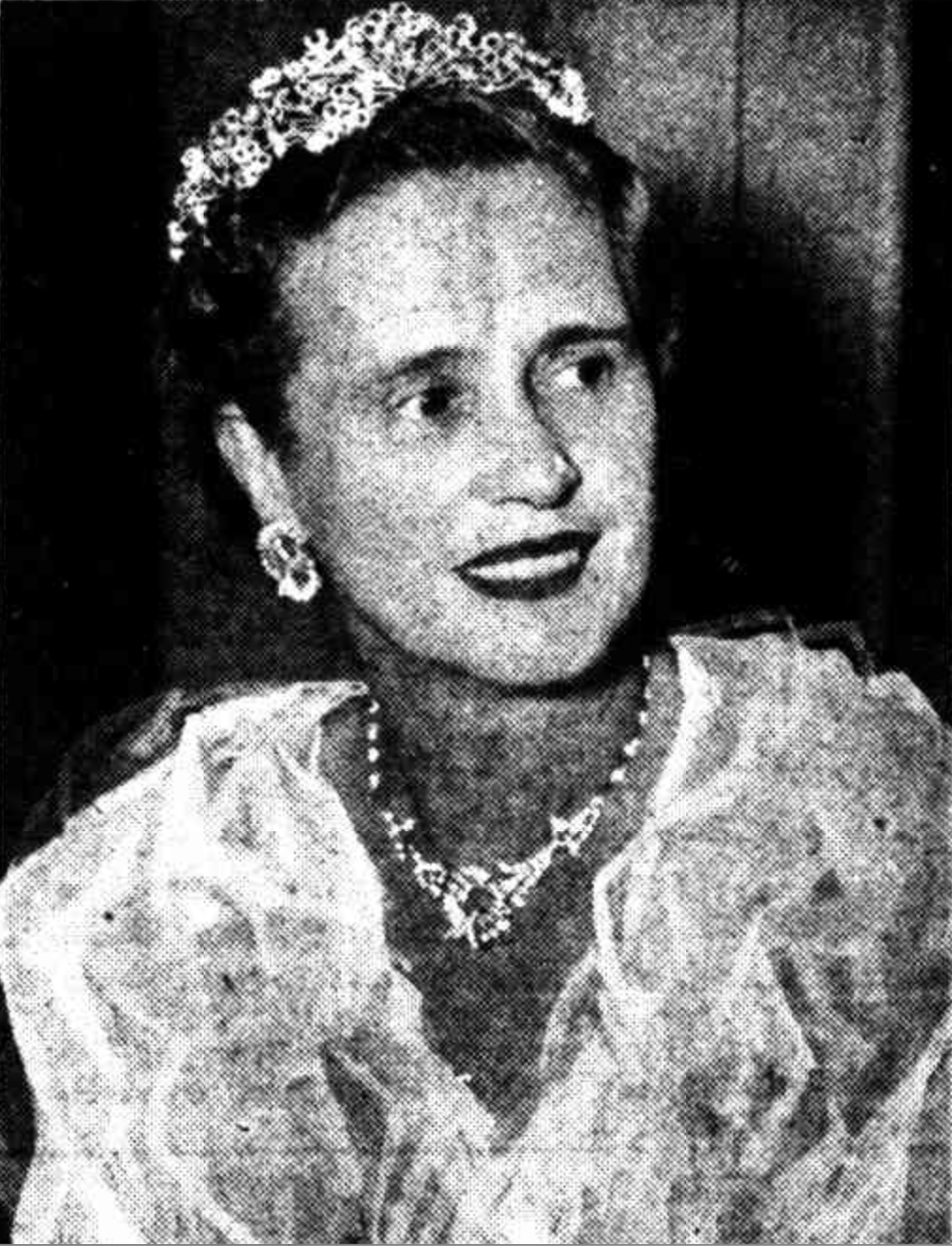
Petronel White in 1954

Mary Hyacinthe Petronel White OBE (4 October 1900 – 1 June 1984) was an Australian women's rights campaigner, the first woman elected to the Brisbane City Council and first woman alderman in a capital city of Australia.

== Early life ==
Born in Townsville, Queensland on 4 October 1900, White was the eldest child of architect Thomas Clive Groom (d. 1953) and Mary Jane Groom (née Brown). She had three younger brothers, Pierre Louis (b.1902), Clive Roland (b.1903) and Hugh Foster (b.1906).

== Career ==
White was the first woman elected to Brisbane City Council in 1949 representing Hamilton Ward for the Citizens' Municipal Organisation (CMO). Her candidature received support from the then Lord Mayor of Brisbane, John Beals Chandler, a fellow CMO member. When elected, she was also the first woman alderman in a capital city of Australia. A year into her first term she called for more women to become involved in aldermanic work, saying: "For women's influence on the council to be effective, more than one woman is needed".

In 1950, she campaigned to raise £20,000 for a swimming pool to be built in Hamilton Ward.

When the Sunday Mail launched the Watch-the-Pennies League under the leadership of Lady Cilento, Jean Cooper, and Betty Paterson, White gave the first demonstration of a money-saving device, an attachment for machine darning.

In 1952, White raised the concerns of women faced with financial hardship on the death of the family breadwinner while probate was determined and ownership of household furniture called into question.

White was appointed an Officer of the British Empire (OBE) in the 1967 Queen's Birthday Honours for her service to the community and local government.
