= 1904 Queensland state election =

- 27 August 1904

All 72 seats in the Legislative Assembly of Queensland 37 Assembly seats were needed for a majority
- Turnout: 84.36 (▲5.48 pp)
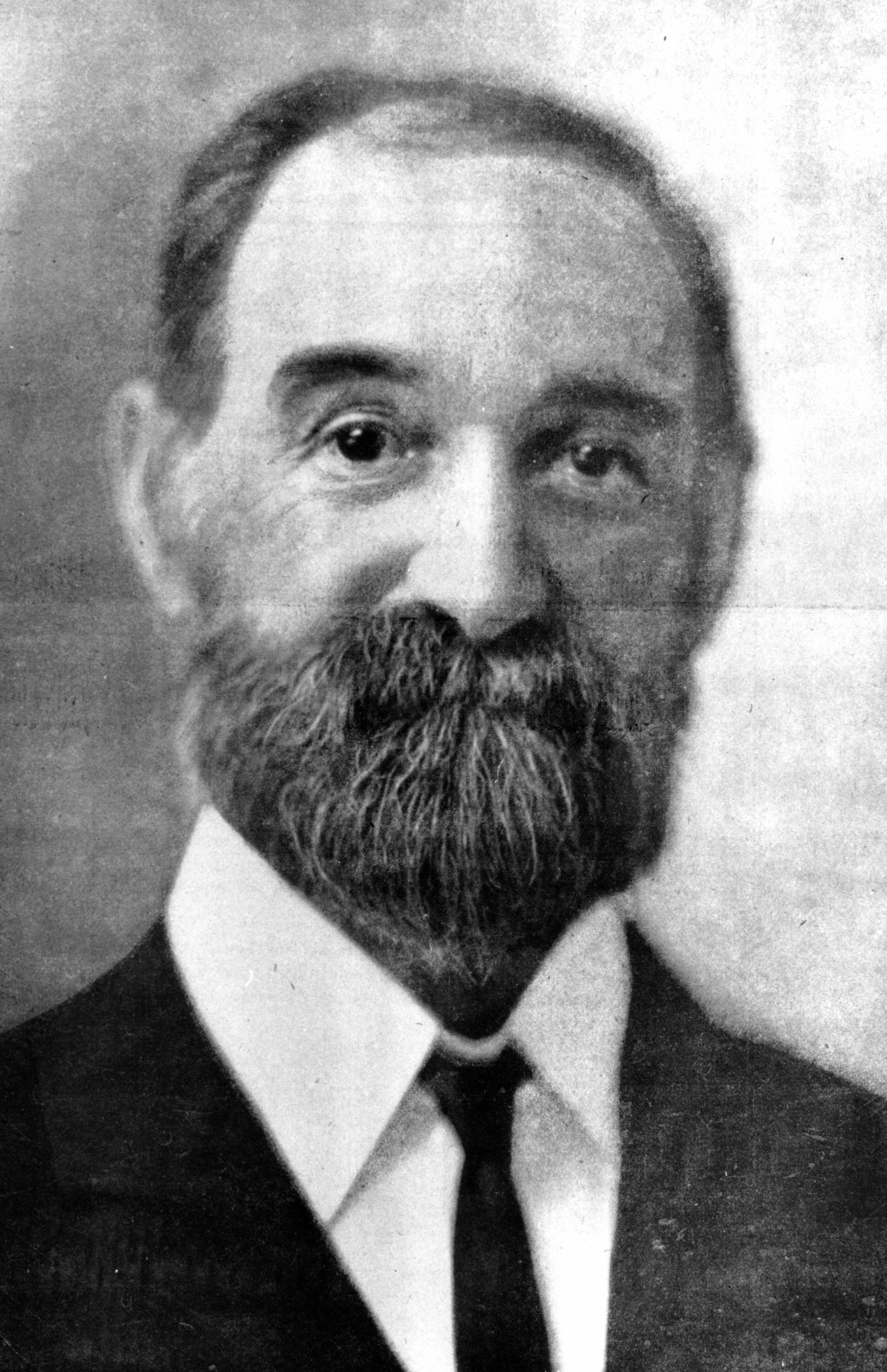

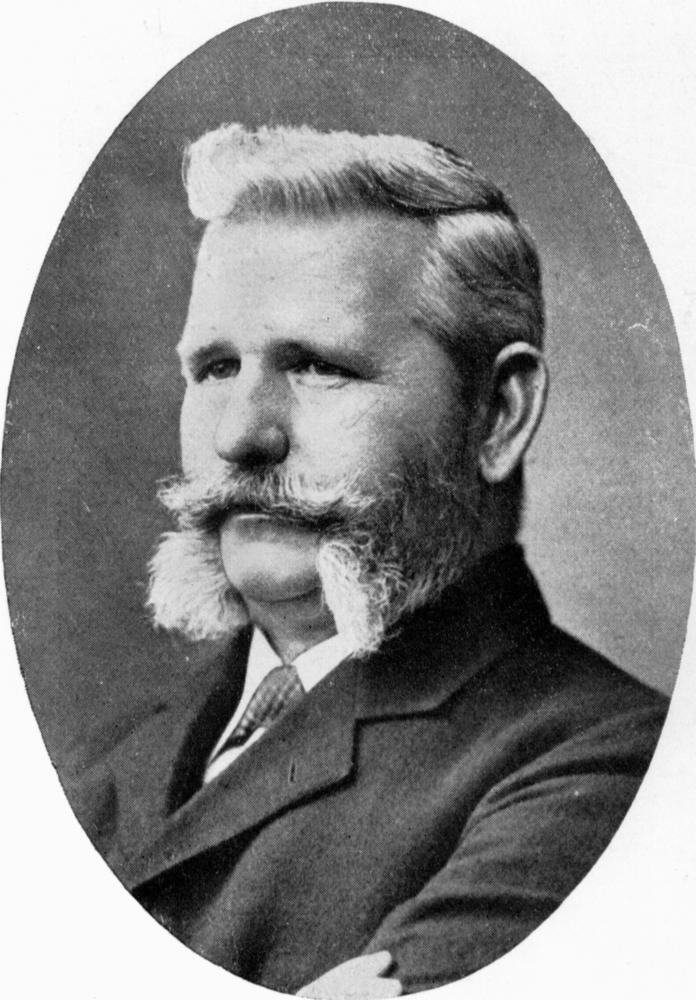

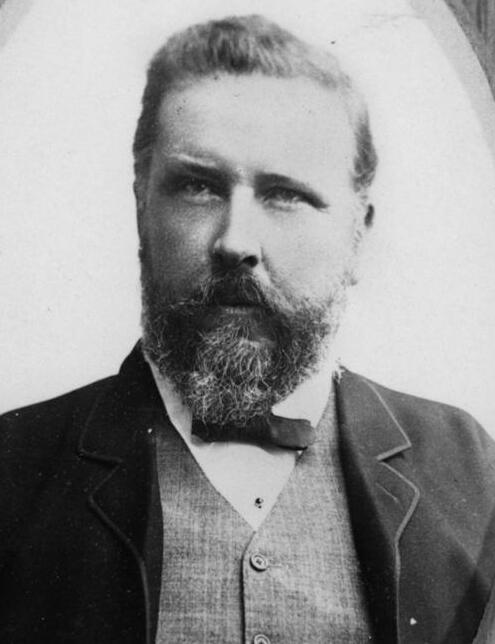
	First party	Second party	Third party
Leader	George Kerr	Arthur Morgan	Arthur Rutledge
Party	Labour	Ministerial	Opposition
Leader's seat	Barcoo	Warwick	Contested Nundah
Last election	23 seats, 39.33%	15 seats, 48.13%	31 seats, 6.86%
Seats won	35	20	16
Seat change	▲12	▲5	▼15
Popular vote	28,961	24,096	23,294
Percentage	36.05%	29.99%	28.99%
Swing	▼3.28	▼18.14	▲22.13
Premier before election
Arthur Morgan
Liberal
Elected Premier
Arthur Morgan
Liberal

Elections were held in the Australian state of Queensland on 27 August 1904 to elect the members of the state's Legislative Assembly. The Ministerial Party maintained government with the continued support of the Labour Party.

This election used contingent voting, at least in the single-member districts.

Five districts were two-seat districts - Mackay, Marlborough, North Brisbane, Rockhampton and South Brisbane. In the two-member constituencies, plurality block voting was used -- electors could cast two valid votes but were allowed to "plump".

== Key dates ==
The elections were held on 27 August 1904.

== Background ==
=== Resignation of the Philp government ===
Robert Philp had been Premier since December 1899, and had been re-elected at the 1902 election. On 9 September 1903, the government put a bill for taxation proposals to the assembly, which was passed by a narrow margin of only two votes (33–31). With several Ministerialists voting against the proposals, Philp moved to adjourn the assembly. The following day, Philp announced he could no longer govern with self-respect, and had tendered his resignation to the Governor, Sir Herbert Chermside. Labour leader William Browne was sent for, and endeavoured to form a ministry, but on 15 September informed the Governor that he had been unable to do so. On Browne's recommendation, the assembly's Speaker, Arthur Morgan, was sent for and commissioned to form a government.

=== Resignation of the Morgan government ===
On 7 June 1904, opposition member James Cribb rose as the last speaker in the address-in-reply to the Governor's speech, and raised an amendment which was a motion of no confidence in the Morgan ministry. Debate over the amendment continued for two weeks, with the vote taking place on 22 June. The amendment was not passed by one vote: 36 against, 35 for. Subsequently, Morgan tendered the resignation of himself and his ministry, recommending a dissolution of parliament. The Governor refused and sent for Robert Philp, who declined to resume the premiership, and announced that a caucus meeting of his party would elect a new leader. On 28 June, the Opposition caucus elected Sir Arthur Rutledge as its leader, and he was commissioned by the Governor to form government. On 7 July, Rutledge told the house he had returned the commission to the Governor, as he had been unable to form a ministry. Morgan and his ministers, who had remained in their positions until the appointment of their successors, again requested a dissolution which was granted.

=== Sir Arthur Rutledge ===
The Ministerialist sitting member in Nundah, Thomas Bridges, faced a formidable opponent in the person of Sir Arthur Rutledge. Rutledge had been a Wesleyan minister in New England and solicitor in Brisbane, before entering the Queensland parliament, where he rose to the office of Attorney-General and accepted a knighthood in 1903. As part of his strategy to become Premier, Rutledge decided not to re-contest his Maranoa electorate in favour of an electorate closer to Brisbane, and chose the semi-rural seat of Nundah which, he assumed, would be easily won by a man of his political experience, especially as it was already held by a fellow Ministerialist. Many large business houses backed Rutledge, as did the editor of the Brisbane Courier (Rutledge's son-in-law Charles Brunsdon Fletcher was the editor of the Brisbane Courier until 1903). His public meetings were packed with prominent religious and political leaders, in contrast to a low-key campaign run by Bridges based on his community service and commitment to keep the cost of railway tickets low. Contrary to every prediction, Bridges won the election by 253 votes. This humiliating loss ended Rutledge's political career, and he accepted an appointment as district judge.

== Results ==
Queensland state election, 27 August 1904 Legislative Assembly << 1902–1907 >>
Enrolled voters	81,266^{[1]}				
Votes cast	68,556		Turnout	84.36%	+5.48%
Informal votes	445		Informal		
Summary of votes by party
Party	Primary votes	%	Swing	Seats	Change
Labour	28,961	36.05%	–3.28%	34	+ 9
Ministerialist	24,096	29.99%	–18.14%	21	– 19
Opposition	23,294	28.99%	+22.13%	15	+ 10
Independent	3,990	4.97%	+1.21%	2	+ 1
Total	80,341			72	

^{1} 103,943 electors were enrolled to vote at the election, but 18 of the 72 seats were uncontested, with 22,677 electors enrolled in those seats.

== See also ==
- Members of the Queensland Legislative Assembly, 1904–1907
