= George Agnew =

George Agnew may refer to:

- Sir George Agnew, 2nd Baronet (1852–1941), British art dealer, publisher, and politician
- George Agnew (Australian politician) (1853–1934), Member of the Queensland Legislative Assembly
- George B. Agnew (1868–1941), American politician
- Sir George Agnew, 7th Baronet (born 1953), British landowner, great-grandson of Sir George Agnew, 2nd Baronet
