= 1949 Brisbane City Council election =

Election of lord mayor and aldermen to Brisbane City Council

- 30 April 1949
- Registered: 274,601
- Lord Mayor
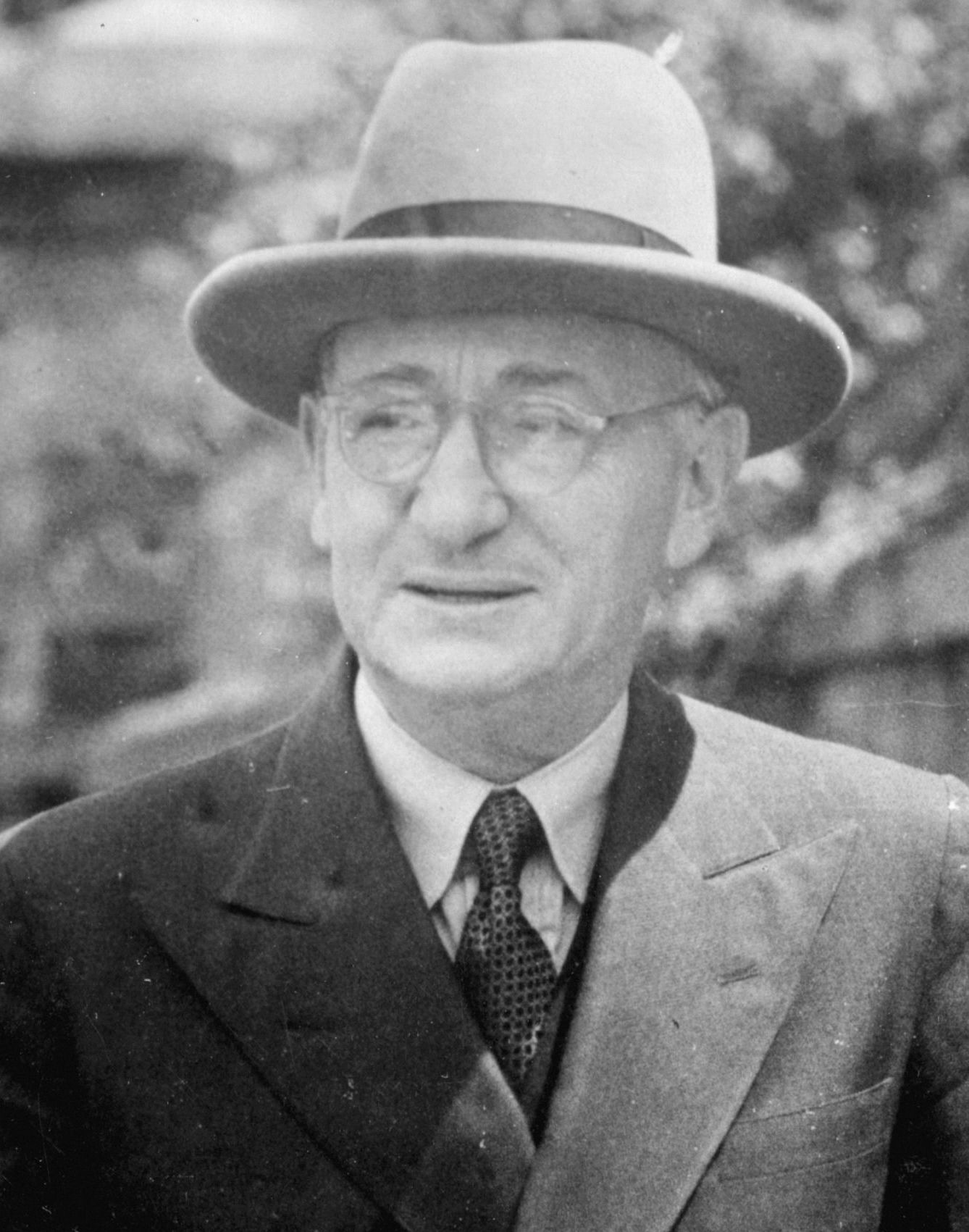

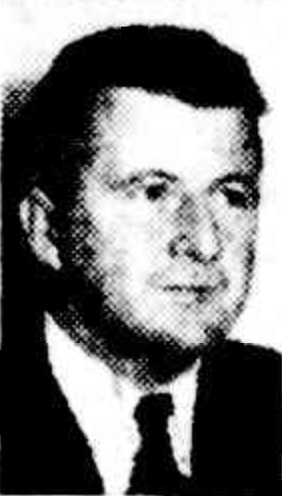

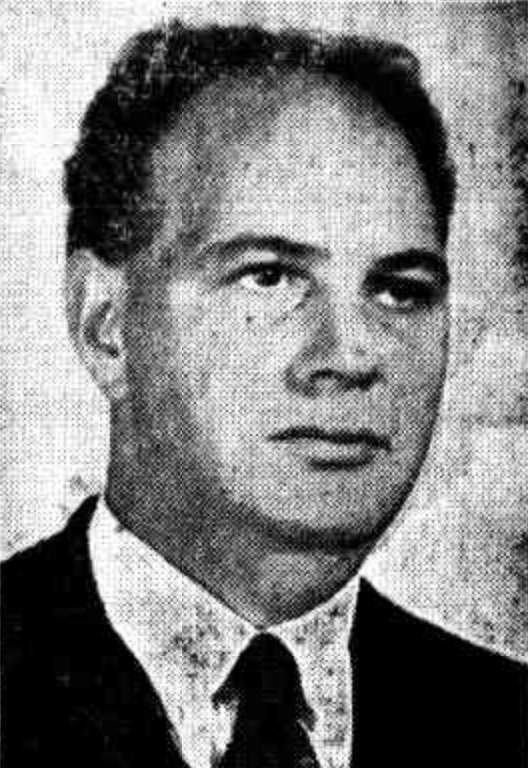
Candidate	J. B. Chandler	Felix Dittmer	Max Julius
Party	Citizens	Labor	Communist
Lord Mayor before election
J. B. Chandler
Citizens
Lord Mayor after election
J. B. Chandler
Citizens
- Aldermen
- All 20 aldermen on Brisbane City Council (excluding the mayor); 11 seats needed for a majority
Party	Leader	Vote %	Seats	+/–
Citizens	J. B. Chandler			
Labor	Wilfred Coutts			
This lists parties that won seats. See the complete results below.

The 1949 Brisbane City Council election was held on 30 April 1949 to elect a lord mayor and 20 aldermen to the Brisbane City Council.

The Citizens' Municipal Organisation (CMO) was returned to power, winning a majority of wards. In the lord mayoral election, J. B. Chandler was re-elected with an increased majority, defeating Labor candidate Felix Dittmer and Communist candidate Max Julius.

Petronel White was elected to Hamilton Ward for the CMO, becoming the first woman to be elected as an alderman in an Australian capital city.

== Electoral system ==
At the time, Brisbane City Council used the first-past-the-post voting system, in contrast to the preferential voting system used at Queensland state and federal elections. Voters were required to number "1" next to the name of their chosen candidate.

Voting was compulsory for anyone over the age of 21 who had lived in the Greater Brisbane area for at least three months.

== Campaign ==
=== Endorsements ===
Newspaper	Endorsement
Brisbane Telegraph	Citizens
The Courier-Mail	Citizens

== Retiring aldermen ==
=== Citizens ===
- Scott Mullin (Hamilton) – lost preselection; announced retirement on 6 December 1948
- W. H. McDonald (Windsor) – preselected but withdrew; announced retirement on 10 March 1949

== Candidates ==
Incumbents are shown in bold text. Successful candidates are highlighted in the relevant colour.

Ward	Held by	Citizens	Labor	Communist	Others
**Lord Mayor**	Citizens	**John Beals Chandler**	Felix Dittmer	Max Julius	
**Baroona**	Labor	Robert William Martin	**Charles Donald Smith**		
**Brisbane**	Labor	Leslie Kellinger Addison	**Robert Alexander Gray**		
**Bulimba**	Labor	Frederick Walter Peterson	**Thomas Holmes**		
**Buranda**	Citizens	**Russel Flexmore Roberts**	J. Melloy		
**Enogerra**	Citizens	**Ernest Lanham**	F. A. Eaton		
**Fortitude Valley**	Labor	Lex David Ord	**Tom Rasey**	Albert Graham	
**Hamilton**	Citizens	Petronel White			Harry Weld (Ind)
**Ithaca**	Citizens	**Leonard Stanley Rudd**	Norman Lewis Buchan		
**Kelvin Grove**	Citizens	**Richard Samuel Griffiths**	Bert Milliner	George Winter Russell	
**Kurilpa**	Labor	Edward David Harris	**Tom Moores**		
**Logan**	Citizens	**Horace Williams**	O. Lewis	M. E. M. Hanson	
**Maree**	Citizens	**Charles Percival Bottomley**	A. Elliott		
**Merthyr**	Labor	Aubrey William Lederle	**Harold Summers Charlton**		
**Nundah**	Citizens	**William Morrow Cook**	F. J. Diamond		
**Oxley**	Citizens	**John Edward Lane**	R. C. E. Mansfield		
**Sandgate**	Citizens	**James Stevingstone Kerr**	A. R. C. Hill		
**South Brisbane**	Labor	Enoch McKenzie	**Wilfred Coutts**	E. Combey	
**Toowong**	Labor	**William Richer Moon**			W. T. H. Carr (Ind. CMO)
**Windsor**	Citizens	James Joseph Ryan	G. B. Mellifont		
**Wynnum**	Citizens	**Willie Russel McNeille Howard**	Dorrie Cloherty	K. K. Watson	S. Green (Ind); S. R. Ewart (WPP)

== Results ==
=== Lord Mayor ===
1949 Brisbane City Council election: Lord Mayor
Party	Candidate	Votes	%	±%
Citizens	J. B. Chandler			
Labor	Felix Dittmer			
Communist	Max Julius			
Total formal votes				
Informal votes				
Registered electors				
Turnout				

=== Baroona ===
1949 Brisbane City Council election: Baroona Ward
Party	Candidate	Votes	%	±%
Labor	C. D. Smith			
Citizens	Robert William Martin			
Total formal votes				
Informal votes				
Registered electors				
Turnout				
Labor hold		Swing		

=== Brisbane ===
1949 Brisbane City Council election: Brisbane Ward
Party	Candidate	Votes	%	±%
Labor	R. A. Gray	4,308	55.77	
Citizens	Leslie Kellinger Addison	3,416	44.23	
Total formal votes		7,724		
Informal votes		462		
Registered electors				
Turnout		8,186		
Labor hold		Swing		

=== Bulimba ===
1949 Brisbane City Council election: Bulimba Ward
Party	Candidate	Votes	%	±%
Citizens	Frederick Walter Peterson			
Total formal votes				
Informal votes				
Registered electors				
Turnout				

=== Buranda ===
1949 Brisbane City Council election: Buranda Ward
Party	Candidate	Votes	%	±%
Citizens	Russel Flexmore Roberts			
Labor	J. Melloy			
Total formal votes				
Informal votes				
Registered electors				
Turnout				

=== Enogerra ===
1949 Brisbane City Council election: Enogerra Ward
Party	Candidate	Votes	%	±%
Citizens	Ernest Lanham			
Total formal votes				
Informal votes				
Registered electors				
Turnout				

=== Fortitude Valley ===
1949 Brisbane City Council election: Fortitude Valley Ward
Party	Candidate	Votes	%	±%
Citizens	Lex David Ord			
Total formal votes				
Informal votes				
Registered electors				
Turnout				

=== Hamilton ===
1949 Brisbane City Council election: Hamilton Ward
Party	Candidate	Votes	%	±%
Citizens	Petronel White			
Total formal votes				
Informal votes				
Registered electors				
Turnout				

=== Ithaca ===
1949 Brisbane City Council election: Ithaca Ward
Party	Candidate	Votes	%	±%
Citizens	Leonard Stanley Rudd			
Total formal votes				
Informal votes				
Registered electors				
Turnout				

=== Kelvin Grove ===
1949 Brisbane City Council election: Kelvin Grove Ward
Party	Candidate	Votes	%	±%
Citizens	Richard Samuel Griffiths			
Labor	B. R. Milliner			
Communist	G. W. Russell			
Total formal votes				
Informal votes				
Registered electors				
Turnout				

=== Kurilpa ===
1949 Brisbane City Council election: Kurilpa Ward
Party	Candidate	Votes	%	±%
Citizens	Edward David Harris			
Labor	T. Moores			
Total formal votes				
Informal votes				
Registered electors				
Turnout				

=== Logan ===
1949 Brisbane City Council election: Logan Ward
Party	Candidate	Votes	%	±%
Citizens	Horace Williams			
Total formal votes				
Informal votes				
Registered electors				
Turnout				

=== Maree ===
1949 Brisbane City Council election: Maree Ward
Party	Candidate	Votes	%	±%
Citizens	Charles Percival Bottomley			
Labor	A. Elliott			
Total formal votes				
Informal votes				
Registered electors				
Turnout				

=== Merthyr ===
1949 Brisbane City Council election: Merthyr Ward
Party	Candidate	Votes	%	±%
Citizens	Aubrey William Lederle			
Labor	H. S. Charlton			
Total formal votes				
Informal votes				
Registered electors				
Turnout				

=== Nundah ===
1949 Brisbane City Council election: Nundah Ward
Party	Candidate	Votes	%	±%
Citizens	William Morrow Cook			
Total formal votes				
Informal votes				
Registered electors				
Turnout				

=== Oxley ===
1949 Brisbane City Council election: Oxley Ward
Party	Candidate	Votes	%	±%
Citizens	John Edward Lane			
Total formal votes				
Informal votes				
Registered electors				
Turnout				

=== Sandgate ===
1949 Brisbane City Council election: Sandgate Ward
Party	Candidate	Votes	%	±%
Citizens	James Stevingstone Kerr			
Total formal votes				
Informal votes				
Registered electors				
Turnout				

=== South Brisbane ===
1949 Brisbane City Council election: South Brisbane Ward
Party	Candidate	Votes	%	±%
Labor	Wilfred Coutts			
Citizens	Enoch McKenzie			
Communist	E. Combey			
Total formal votes				
Informal votes				
Registered electors				
Turnout				
Labor hold		Swing		

=== Toowong ===
1949 Brisbane City Council election: Toowong Ward
Party	Candidate	Votes	%	±%
Citizens	William Richer Moon			
Independent CMO	W. T. H. Carr			
Total formal votes				
Informal votes				
Registered electors				
Turnout				

=== Windsor ===
1949 Brisbane City Council election: Windsor Ward
Party	Candidate	Votes	%	±%
Citizens	James Joseph Ryan			
Total formal votes				
Informal votes				
Registered electors				
Turnout				

=== Wynnum ===
1949 Brisbane City Council election: Wynnum Ward
Party	Candidate	Votes	%	±%
Citizens	Willie Russel McNeille Howard			
Labor	Dorrie Cloherty			
Communist	K. K. Watson			
Independent	S. Green			
Wynnum People's Party	S. R. Ewart			
Total formal votes				
Informal votes				
Registered electors				
Turnout				

== Analysis ==
The results of the election was considered an omen of a very successful result for the Queensland People's Party (QPP) in the coming state election within the metropolitan seats within Brisbane. A QPP victory was predicted in every seat but Brisbane, and it was suggested by the party that the safe Labor federal seat of Griffith may become marginal. These predictions did not come to pass.
