= Frank Sleeman =

Australian politician (1915–2000)

- Sleeman in August 1977

Lord Mayor of Brisbane
- In office 1976–1982
- Preceded by: Bryan Walsh
- Succeeded by: Roy Harvey

Personal details
- Born: Frank Northey Sleeman; 4 March 1915
- Died: 1 August 2000 (aged 85) Sandgate, Queensland, Australia
- Party: Australian Labor Party
- Occupation: Politician

Frank Northey Sleeman (4 March 1915 – 1 August 2000) was an Australian politician, who served as Lord Mayor of Brisbane from 1976 to 1982.

== Early life, education and military ==
Sleeman grew up in Redfern, Sydney. He attended Canterbury Boys' High School.

Sleeman was a lieutenant in the army at the outbreak of World War II. He was captured by the Japanese and spent 3 years and 8 months as a prisoner of war in Jentsuji Prison Camp Japan.

After the war, Sleeman settled in Townsville and worked as a salesman for the Australian-arm of General Electric. He married Norma Robinson on 29 December 1945.

== Lord Mayor of Brisbane ==
Major Sleeman became Lord Mayor of Brisbane in 1976 after the Australian Labor Party leader in the Brisbane City Council, Bryan Walsh, failed to hold his ward. The major project of his time in office was the building of the site for the 1982 Commonwealth Games, which is now named the Sleeman Sports Complex in his honour.

Frank Sleeman died on 1 August 2000 in a Freemason's nursing home at Sandgate, Queensland, aged 85.

== Books and articles ==
- Blackburn, Kevin (2000). Commemorating and commodifying the prisoner of war experience in south-east Asia:The creation of Changi Prison Museum (Journal of the Australian War Memorial, Issue 33). Canberra: Australian War Memorial.

Preceded by Bryan Walsh	Lord Mayor of Brisbane; 1976–1982	Succeeded by Roy Harvey
