= Reg Groom =

Australian politician

Sir Reginald Groom
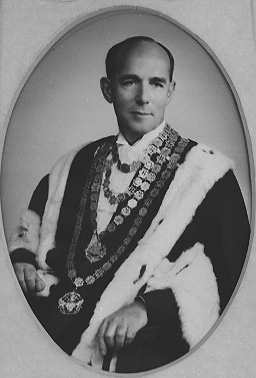
- Reg Groom in his Lord Mayoral robes – 1955

7th Lord Mayor of Brisbane
- In office 1955–1961
- Preceded by: Frank Roberts
- Succeeded by: Clem Jones

Personal details
- Born: Thomas Reginald Groom; 30 December 1906 Teneriffe, Queensland, Australia
- Died: 28 June 1987 (aged 80) Guyra, New South Wales, Australia
- Party: Citizens' Municipal Organisation
- Occupation: Accountant, businessman

Sir Thomas Reginald Groom (1906–1987) was Lord Mayor of Brisbane in Queensland, Australia from 1955 to 1961.

== Early life ==
Groom was born at Teneriffe, Queensland, on 30 December 1906, and educated at Brisbane Grammar School and the University of Queensland, where he was President of the University of Queensland Union. He graduated in 1932 and joined his father's accountancy firm.

== Politics ==
In 1943, he entered local politics as a Citizens' Municipal Organisation councillor in the Brisbane City Council. He served two terms as Lord Mayor from 1955. Despite severe budget restrictions he attempted to improve the city's infrastructure, particularly the water, electricity, and sewer networks. His successor, the Labor Party's Clem Jones, was more successful in these endeavours.

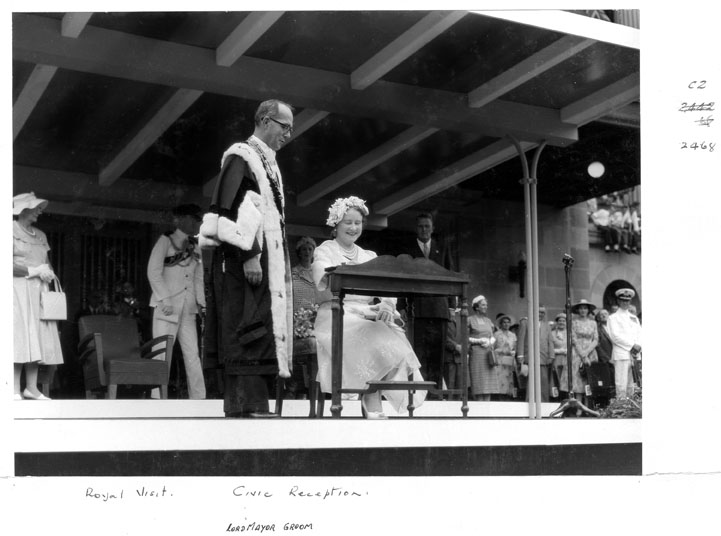
Her Majesty Queen Elizabeth The Queen Mother and Lord Mayor Groom, Brisbane, February 1958

== Later life ==
Following electoral defeat, Groom was knighted in 1961 and returned to a career in accountancy and business. As well as running his own accountancy firm, during the 1960s and 1970s he served as chairman of Mount Isa Mines, P&O Australia and the Commonwealth Bank, amongst others.

Reg Groom died on 28 June 1987 at Guyra, New South Wales.

Political offices
Preceded by Frank Roberts	Lord Mayor of Brisbane; 1955–1961	Succeeded by Clem Jones
