= Clem Jones =

Australian politician

Clem Jones AO
- Jones in April 1970

8th Lord Mayor of Brisbane
- In office 1961–1975
- Preceded by: Reg Groom
- Succeeded by: Bryan Walsh

Personal details
- Born: 16 January 1918 Ipswich, Queensland, Australia
- Died: 15 December 2007 Brisbane, Queensland, Australia
- Party: Labor
- Spouse: Sylvia nee Murphy (d.1999)
- Education: University of Queensland
- Occupation: Businessman, Philanthropist
- Profession: Surveyor

Clem Jones AO (16 January 1918 – 15 December 2007) was an Australian politician and administrator who served as the 8th Lord Mayor of Brisbane from 1961 to 1975. He represented the Queensland Labor Party in council politics, and is the longest-serving lord mayor to date. He was chair of the Darwin Reconstruction Commission from 1975 to 1978. Outside of politics, he was a businessman and philanthropist.

== Public life ==
During Jones' 15 years in office as the head of the Brisbane City Council, assisted by the Town Clerk J. C. Slaughter, Brisbane underwent considerable change.

In 1961, Brisbane was a city with no town planning, many unpaved streets, limited water supply and few areas with sewers—relying instead on outhouses or septic tanks. Through the 1960s Jones successfully led the council to develop a town plan, seal roads, improve drainage and connect sewers to most of the city. The city council, under his stewardship, purchased city properties to build underground car parks, which were then topped with public parks and gardens. In the suburbs, land was acquired for open space and parkland. Work started on the development of the Brisbane Botanic Gardens, Mount Coot-tha.

In 1968, to considerable public dismay, and some protest, Jones announced that Brisbane's extensive tramway routes would be replaced by diesel buses.

In 1971, Jones chose to promote Brisbane as host city for the 1978 Commonwealth Games. Without support from the Queensland Government and due to a lack of preparation, the bid was unsuccessful. Convinced of the benefits and suitability of Brisbane to host the event, Jones completed a winning bid in 1974 for the next games in 1982.

By 1974, early graves at the South Brisbane and Toowong cemeteries had fallen into disrepair. The Brisbane City Council under Jones' stewardship, wished to convert portions within these cemeteries into parkland. Instructions were given by Jones to the health department to remove untidy graves, resulting in the destruction of at least 2,500 memorials.

After completing his duties as Lord Mayor in 1975, Jones was briefly the curator at the Brisbane Cricket Ground (the Gabba) and even prepared the wicket for a test match. Jones was also appointed chairman of the Darwin Reconstruction Commission in 1975 to guide the rebuilding of the city of Darwin after its near destruction by Cyclone Tracy.

Jones stood for the Labor Party for the state seat of Yeronga in 1972 and, at Gough Whitlam's request, the federal seat of Griffith in 1974 – both unsuccessfully. He was involved in the opposition to the attempted federal takeover of the Queensland State Branch of the Party in the early 1980s, being one of several senior members of the Queensland branch to challenge the takeover in the courts. Briefly expelled for his involvement, he was later reinstated to the party and given life membership in recognition of his achievements in Brisbane.

Jones was also chairman of the Brisbane Strikers, which won the National Soccer League title in 1997.

Jones was a delegate in 1998 to the Australian Constitutional Convention as the head of the Clem Jones Constitutional Republic Team. He favoured the republican model of government in which the head of state is directly elected rather than being chosen by Parliament.

Jones also established FoodBank Queensland in 1995, which helps to fund the school breakfast program.

== Personal life ==
Jones was born in Ipswich, Queensland in 1918. His father was a master at the Anglican Church Grammar School in East Brisbane, Queensland, where Jones was also a student. He displayed an interest in tennis and cricket. Jones went on to attend the University of Queensland, taking a BSc in mathematics and geology. His wife, Sylvia, died in 1999. They had no children.

== Honours ==
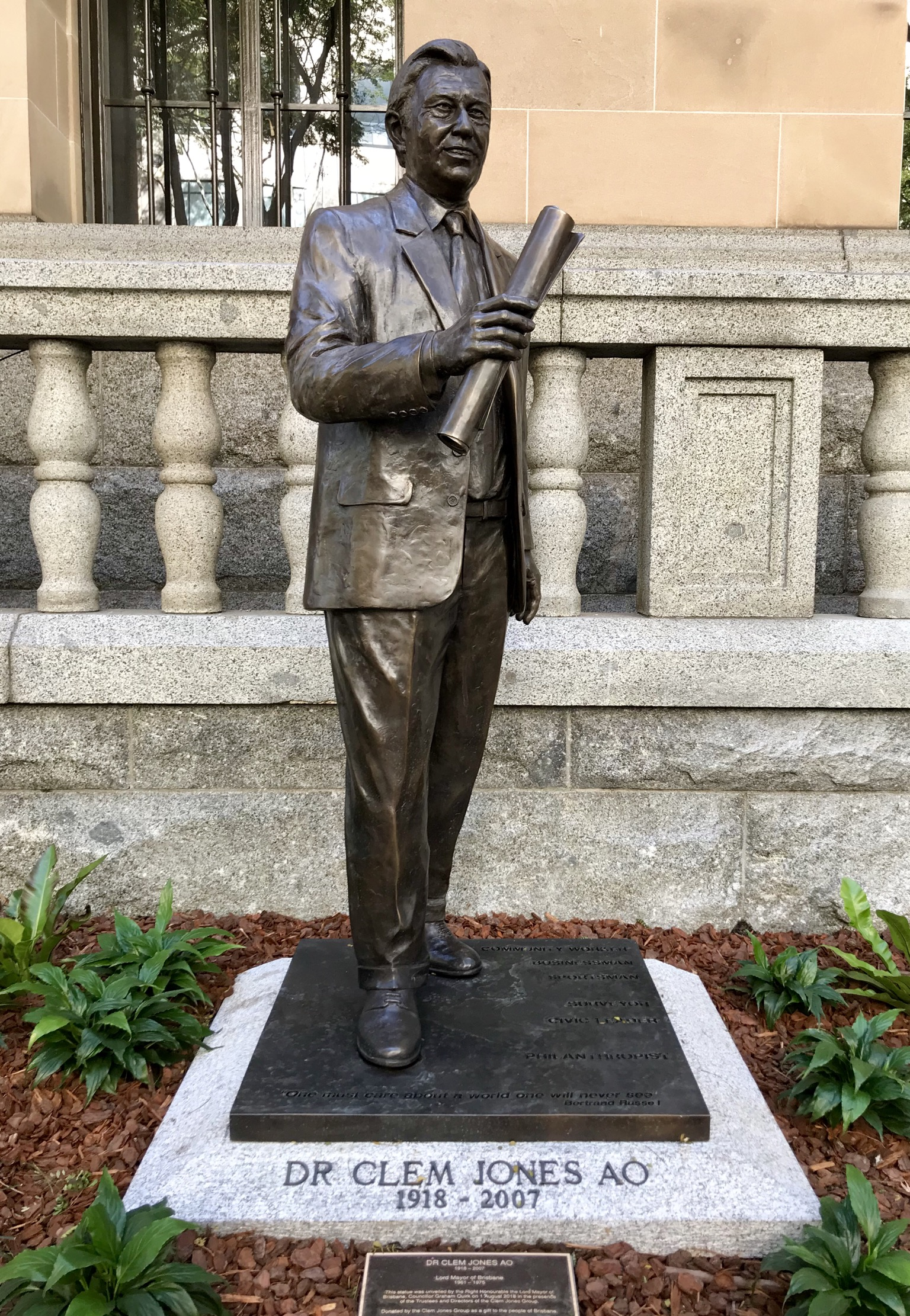
Clem Jones statue, Adelaide Street, Brisbane

- Officer (AO) of the Order of Australia in 1976
- Queenslander of the Year in 1990
- Honorary doctorate from the University of Queensland (1996)
- Australian Sports Medal in 2000
- Centenary Medal in 2001
- Queensland Business Leaders Hall of Fame (2009)

== In popular culture ==
- Prior to the redevelopment of the Gabba the grandstand was known as the "Clem Jones Stand".
- The nickname of former Australian cricketer Terry Alderman was "Clem", as Clem Jones was both an alderman and a cricket fan
- The Clem Jones Tunnel, more commonly known as the Clem 7, was named in his honour and opened in Brisbane in 2010.
- The Leukaemia Foundation of Queensland was a beneficiary of the generous support of Clem Jones who made a significant donation to the Foundation in 2005 and as a result the Foundation named their latest Accommodation and Support Village at Coopers Plains in Brisbane in his honour.
- Since his death his Estate and Foundation have funded medical research in his name including the Clem Jones Centre for Ageing and Dementia Research at UQ's Queensland Brain Institute, the Clem Jones Centre for Neurobiology and Stem Cell Research at Griffith University and the Clem Jones Research Centre for Regenerative Medicine at Bond University. A scholarship has been provided at the University of Queensland - the Clem and Ted Jones Memorial.

== See also ==
- List of mayors and lord mayors of Brisbane

Political offices
| Preceded by Reg Groom | Lord Mayor of Brisbane; 1961–1975 | Succeeded by Bryan Walsh |
