= William Kelso (politician) =

Australian politician

Member of the Queensland Legislative Assembly for Nundah
- In office 12 May 1923 – 11 June 1932
- Preceded by: Hubert Sizer
- Succeeded by: John Hayes

Personal details
- Born: William Kelso; 1872 Busby, East Renfrewshire, Scotland
- Died: 1 January 1956 (aged 83) Nundah, Queensland, Australia
- Party: CPNP
- Other political affiliations: Queensland United Party
- Spouse: Elizabeth Freeman (m.1900 d.1939)
- Occupation: Accountant

William Kelso (1872 – 2 January 1956) was a member of the Queensland Legislative Assembly.

== Biography ==
Kelso was born in Busby, East Renfrewshire, Scotland, to John Kelso and his wife Catherine (née Marshall). Following his education at the Brisbane Normal School and Brisbane Grammar School, he worked in Nundah as a public accountant.

On 3 October 1900, Kelso married Elizabeth Freeman (d. 1939) in Brisbane; the couple had one son and one daughter. Kelso died in January 1956 and was cremated at the Mt Thompson Crematorium.

== Public life ==
A member of the Queensland United Party, Kelso was elected to the Queensland Legislative Assembly in 1923 as the member for Nundah. He held the seat until 1932, when he was defeated by the Labor candidate John Hayes.

Parliament of Queensland
Preceded by Hubert Sizer	Member for Nundah; 1923–1932	Succeeded by John Hayes
