= Richard Sumner =

Australian politician (1859–1927)

The Hon Richard Sumner
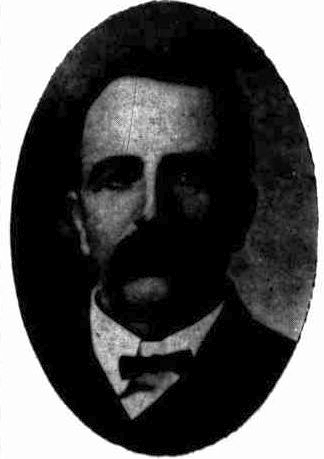
- Richard Sumner, 1911

Member of the Queensland Legislative Assembly for Nundah
- In office 18 May 1907 – 2 October 1909
- Preceded by: Thomas Bridges
- Succeeded by: Thomas Bridges

Member of the Queensland Legislative Council
- In office 10 October 1917 – 23 March 1922

Personal details
- Born: Richard Sumner; 1859 Bolton, Lancashire, England
- Died: 11 June 1927 (aged 67or 68) Brisbane, Queensland, Australia
- Resting place: Nundah Cemetery
- Spouse: Eliza Jane Robinson (m.1886 d.1933)
- Occupation: Pineapple farmer, Small business owner

Richard Sumner (January 1859 – 11 June 1927) was a member of both the Queensland Legislative Council and Queensland Legislative Assembly.

== Early life ==
Sumner was born in January 1859 at Bolton, Lancashire, to Joseph Sumner and his wife Ann (née Moore) and educated at the Mechanics' Institute.

Arriving in Queensland in 1883 at age 24, he took up Pineapple farming at Zillmere in the 1880s before establishing a fruit preserving factory in Fortitude Valley. Sumner was President of the Queensland Central Executive for the Labor Party, Controller of the Trade Boards and a Commissioner on the Commonwealth Price Fixing Board. He was also a director and guarantor for the Daily Standard.

== Political career ==
Before joining the Labour Party, Sumner was a supporter of the Kidston–Morgan ministry and later the Opposition group. At the 1907 state election, he was a candidate for the seat of Nundah and defeated Mt Atthow by 152 votes. He held the seat until the 1909 when the former member, Thomas Bridges, defeated Sumner by 178 votes.

When the Labour Party starting forming governments in Queensland, it found much of its legislation being blocked by a hostile Queensland Legislative Council, where members had been appointed for life by successive conservative governments. After a failed referendum in May 1917, Premier Ryan tried a new tactic, and later that year advised the Governor, Sir Hamilton John Goold-Adams, to appoint thirteen new members whose allegiance lay with Labour to the council.

Sumner was one of the thirteen new members, and went on to serve for four and a half years until the council was abolished in March, 1922.

== Personal life ==
On 6 April 1886, Smith married Eliza Jane Robinson at Brisbane and together had three sons and four daughters. On 11 June 1927 he died at his home "Langton", Norman Parade, Eagle Junction, Brisbane in June 1927 after several months of illness. He was buried the same day at Nundah Cemetery.
