= Frank Roberts (Australian politician) =

Australian politician

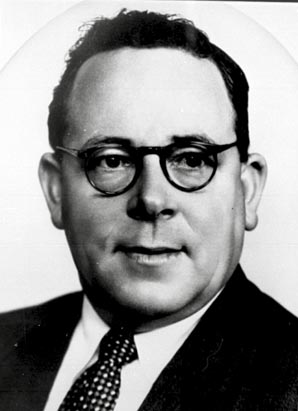
- Frank Roberts – 1952.

6th Lord Mayor of Brisbane
- In office 27 March 1952 – 3 April 1955
- Preceded by: John Beals Chandler
- Succeeded by: Reg Groom

Member of the Queensland Legislative Assembly for Nundah
- In office 3 May 1947 – 19 May 1956
- Preceded by: John Hayes
- Succeeded by: Jim Hadley

Personal details
- Born: Frank Edward Roberts; 28 February 1913 Melbourne, Victoria, Australia
- Died: 7 June 1992 (aged 79) Brisbane, Queensland, Australia
- Party: Labor
- Spouse: Gladys Tuttle
- Education: University of Queensland
- Occupation: Barrister

Frank Edwards Roberts (28 February 1913 – 7 June 1992) was an Australian politician. He was Lord Mayor of Brisbane from 1952 to 1955, and was a member of the Queensland Legislative Assembly from 1947 to 1956, representing the electorate of Nundah. As with his predecessor as Mayor, John Beals Chandler, he was simultaneously Lord Mayor and a state MP. He represented Labor from 1947 to 1953 before resigning from the party; he was defeated for re-election as an independent for Lord Mayor in 1955 and as an MP in 1956.

Roberts was born in Melbourne, but was raised on a farm in the Mallee region of Victoria, and did not attend school until age nine due to the isolation. His family moved to Queensland during the Great Depression, and settled in Ashgrove. Roberts worked as a farm labourer from 1930 to 1932, in road-building and quarrying as relief work from 1932 to 1934, as a sewerage miner in 1934, then from 1935 a clerk in the public service, while studying at night at the Queensland Teachers' Training College. He graduated in arts and law from the University of Queensland, and was admitted to the bar in 1943, although he later chose to practice as a solicitor from 1949. He served on the Labor bodies for the local state and federal electorates, had been a trade union member for many years, and was involved in a number of local organisations at Nundah. He was an unsuccessful Labor candidate at the 1944 state election, losing to John Beals Chandler.

He was elected to the Legislative Assembly at the 1947 state election, defeating incumbent Labor MP John Hayes for party preselection and then defeating future minister Alex Dewar on election day. In 1952, he nominated as the Labor candidate for Lord Mayor against the incumbent, conservative John Beals Chandler, who had defeated Roberts at the 1944 state election. Chandler was a very prominent figure and the race was thought to be hopeless for Labor; however, Roberts won, not only winning the Lord Mayoralty but electing a sizable number of Labor councillors along with him. Roberts inherited substantial debt from his predecessors in both the City Fund and Loan Fund, but was able to turn both around, shifting the City Fund into credit and heavily reducing Loan Fund debt. The council also built the Tennyson Power Station during his mayoralty.

Roberts resigned from the Labor Party on 25 August 1953 in protest at a Labor state executive direction to rescind an already-granted salary increase for Brisbane aldermen, alleging that it amounted to interference with the council. He resolved to continue both as Lord Mayor and in state parliament as an independent. A bid for readmission to the Labor Party was rejected on 20 August 1954 after vehement opposition from Treasurer Ted Walsh.

In December 1955, he announced that he would recontest the Lord Mayoralty as an independent. Although it had been long-rumored that Labor would not run a candidate, Labor nominated solicitor M. G. Lyons against Roberts, ensuring a three-cornered race, which was won by conservative Citizens' Municipal Organisation candidate Reg Groom. He contested the 1956 state election as an independent, unsuccessfully challenging Premier Vince Gair in his seat of South Brisbane.

He was readmitted to the Labor Party in 1958. He was the unsuccessful Labor candidate for his old seat at the 1963 election and unsuccessfully contested Labor preselection for the 1966 federal election in the seat of Lilley. Outside of politics, he continued to work as a solicitor until late in life, doing much pro bono work for local community groups.

Parliament of Queensland
Preceded by John Hayes	Member for Nundah; 1947–1956	Succeeded by Jim Hadley
Civic offices
Preceded by John Beals Chandler	Lord Mayor of Brisbane; 1952–1955	Succeeded by Reg Groom
