= Bryan Walsh =

Australian politician

- Walsh in August 1975

9th Lord Mayor of Brisbane
- In office 1975–1976
- Preceded by: Clem Jones
- Succeeded by: Frank Sleeman

Personal details
- Born: Bryan Vincent Walsh
- Party: Labor (since 1949)

Bryan Vincent Walsh was Lord Mayor of Brisbane, Australia from 1975 to 1976.

== Career ==
Before being elected to the Brisbane City Council, Walsh was a schoolteacher. He joined the Ashgrove branch of the Labor Party in 1949.

In late 1974 Lord Mayor of Brisbane Clem Jones announced he would not stand in the upcoming election. After resigning the following year he was replaced by Walsh (who had been vice-mayor). Walsh served as Lord Mayor for nine months before losing his seat at the 1976 election.

Preceded by Clem Jones	Lord Mayor of Brisbane; 1975–1976	Succeeded by Frank Sleeman
