= Thomas Bridges (Australian politician) =

Australian politician

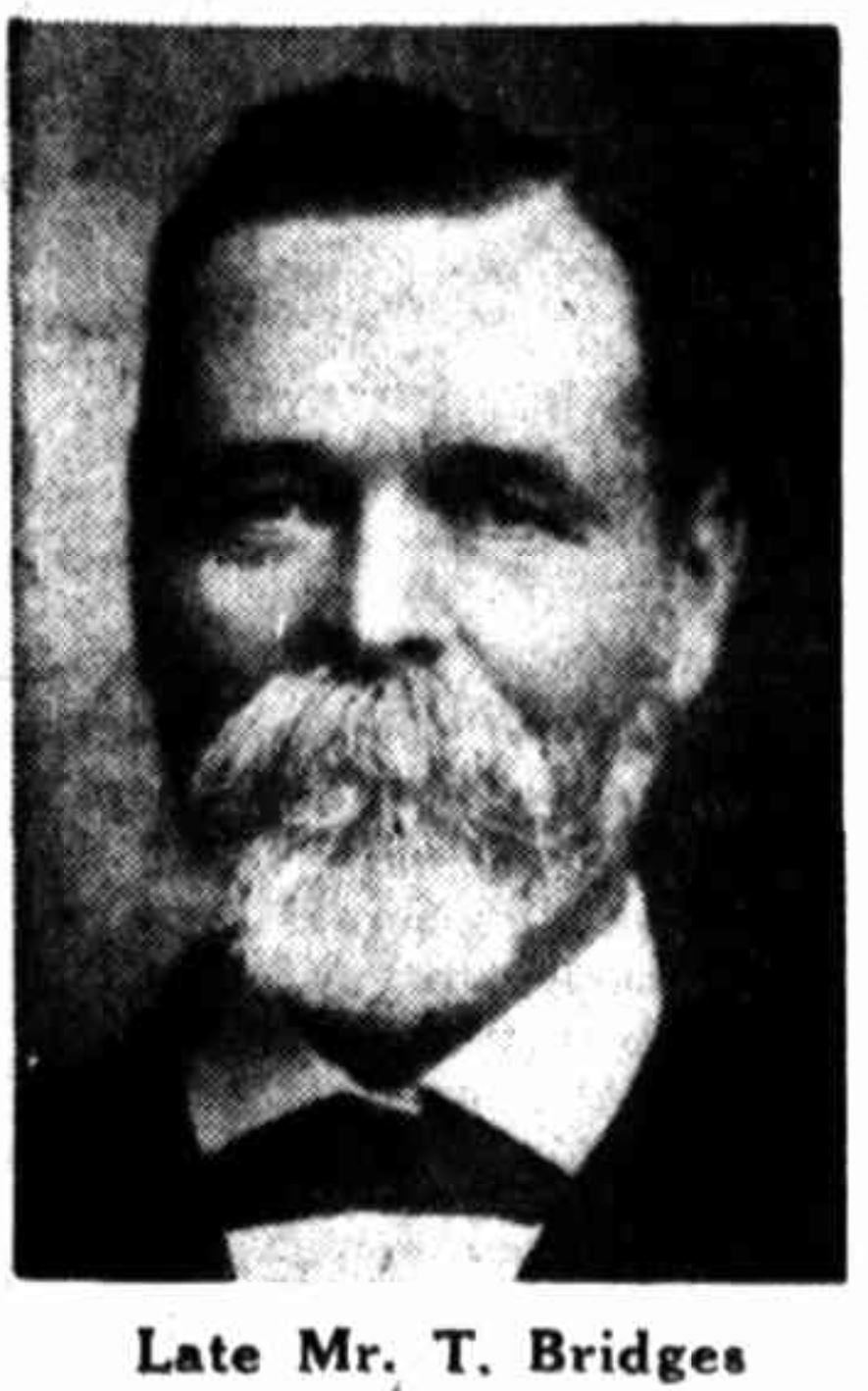
- Thomas Bridges,1939

Member of the Queensland Legislative Assembly for Nundah
- In office 21 March 1896 – 18 May 1907
- Preceded by: George Agnew
- Succeeded by: Richard Sumner
- In office 2 October 1909 – 16 March 1918
- Preceded by: Richard Sumner
- Succeeded by: Hubert Sizer

Personal details
- Born: Thomas Bridges; 12 November 1853 Nundah, Brisbane, Colony of New South Wales
- Died: 4 June 1939 (aged 85) Brisbane, Queensland, Australia
- Resting place: Nundah Cemetery
- Party: Ministerialist
- Other political affiliations: Liberal Party
- Spouse: Margaret Elizabeth Lee (d. 1938)
- Occupation: farmer

Thomas Bridges (12 November 1853 – 4 June 1939) was a member of the Legislative Assembly of Queensland in the seat of Nundah (21 March 1896 – 18 May 1907) as a member of the Ministerial Party and subsequently as a member of the Liberal Party (2 October 1909 – 16 March 1918).

== Early life ==
Thomas Bridges was born on 12 November 1853 at Nundah, then known as German Station, to a local farmer, George Bridges and his wife, Mary Brightman, both immigrants from England. Thomas was the first of their Australian-born children, having already three born in England. His father built the Kedron Brook Hotel, a popular "watering hole" halfway between Brisbane and Sandgate, and constructed a bypass in Sandgate Road around Donkin's Hill, which led to the development of the village at German Station.

Bridges and a number of his siblings were amongst the first students enrolled at the new German Station National School, when it opened in 1865.

Initially Bridges followed in his father's footsteps as a farmer with interests in fruit and dairy, but later focussed exclusively on fruit, including pineapples, contributing to the success of fruit growing in the Nundah-Zillmere district.

Bridges married Margaret Elizabeth Lee on 17 July 1873 at the home of her parents, Rose Hill Farm near Cabbage Tree Creek, now known as Boondall. They had 13 children, namely: Emma Jane, Amelia Mary, Thomas George, Joseph Brightman, Charles Josiah, Margaret Mary Elizabeth, Joseph Silas, Samuel Brightman, Eva Violet Annie, Alice Maud Mildred, Laura Eunice Elsie, Willie and Lucy Alvena, of whom two died as infants.

== Political life ==
Bridges made his first foray into public life as a member of the Nundah Divisional Board from 1883 to 1896, being chosen as its chairman on three occasions.

Being a popular and well-regarded local farmer, Bridges stood for the Queensland Legislative Assembly in the 1896 colonial election as a Ministerialist, beating the incumbent George Agnew by 60 votes in the electoral district of Nundah. Being a farmer accustomed to an early start to his working day, the late night sittings of Parliament took him by surprise. On his first late night sitting, he had to ask to be excused as he did not wish to miss the last train back to Nundah.

In the 1904 election, Bridges faced a formidable opponent in the person of Sir Arthur Rutledge. Rutledge had been a Wesleyan minister in New England and solicitor in Brisbane, before entering the Queensland parliament, where he rose to the office of Attorney-General and accepted a knighthood in 1903. As part of his strategy to become Premier after the 1904 election, Rutledge decided to contest an electorate closer to Brisbane, and chose the semi-rural seat of Nundah which, he assumed, would be easily won by a man of his political experience, especially as it was already held by a fellow Ministerialist. Many large business houses backed Rutledge, as did the editor of the Brisbane Courier, of which Rutledge's son-in-law Charles Brunsdon Fletcher was the editor of the newspaper until 1903. His public meetings were packed with prominent religious and political leaders, in contrast to a low-key campaign run by Bridges based on his community service and commitment to keep the cost of railway tickets low. Contrary to every prediction, Bridges won the election by 253 votes. This humiliating loss ended Rutledge's political career, and he accepted an appointment as district judge.

This election of 1904 had proved to be very personal. In addition to the internecine offensive by a member of his own Ministerial Party, Johann Leopold Zillmann, an old and now deceased friend and early resident of German Station, had been ejected from his Wesleyan ministry in New England by Rutledge in concert with disaffected members of his congregation.

Bridges decided to leave politics on 18 May 1907 at the following election, when he was succeeded in the seat by Richard Sumner.

Loyal local people persuaded Bridges to return to politics, and he stood against Sumner and won back his seat, as a member of the Liberal Party, serving from 2 October 1909 until 16 March 1918 when he finally retired.

Being a farmer, Bridges took particular interest in legislation related to farming, especially diseases in plants and extermination of flying foxes which raid fruit trees. He also advocated that local Chinese be repatriated to China, and supported the indentured labour of Kanakas in the cane fields of Queensland.

Although a long-term parliamentarian, Bridges was no great orator and was often described as unsophisticated. However he gained a reputation of tirelessly pursuing government departments over issues reported by his constituents, and served his party for many years as Whip. After his retirement, he was reported to be disillusioned with politics.

== Later life ==
Bridges' wife Margaret died on 15 January 1938, and was buried in the Nundah Cemetery.

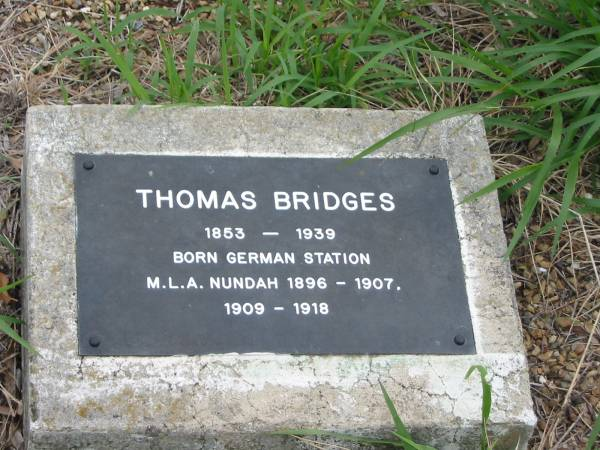
Grave marker of Thomas Bridges in the Nundah Cemetery

Less than 18 months later, on 4 June 1939 while sitting and talking with a sick friend in St Martin's Hospital in Brisbane, Bridges suddenly fell backwards and died. Bridges was buried the following day beside his wife.

The original headstone has not survived, but a modern plaque reads:

Thomas Bridges
1853 – 1939
Born German Station
M.L.A. Nundah 1896–1907,
1909–1918

Parliament of Queensland
Preceded by George Agnew	Member for Nundah; 1896–1907	Succeeded by Richard Sumner
Preceded by Richard Sumner	Member for Nundah; 1909–1918	Succeeded by Hubert Sizer
