= Nundah Cemetery =

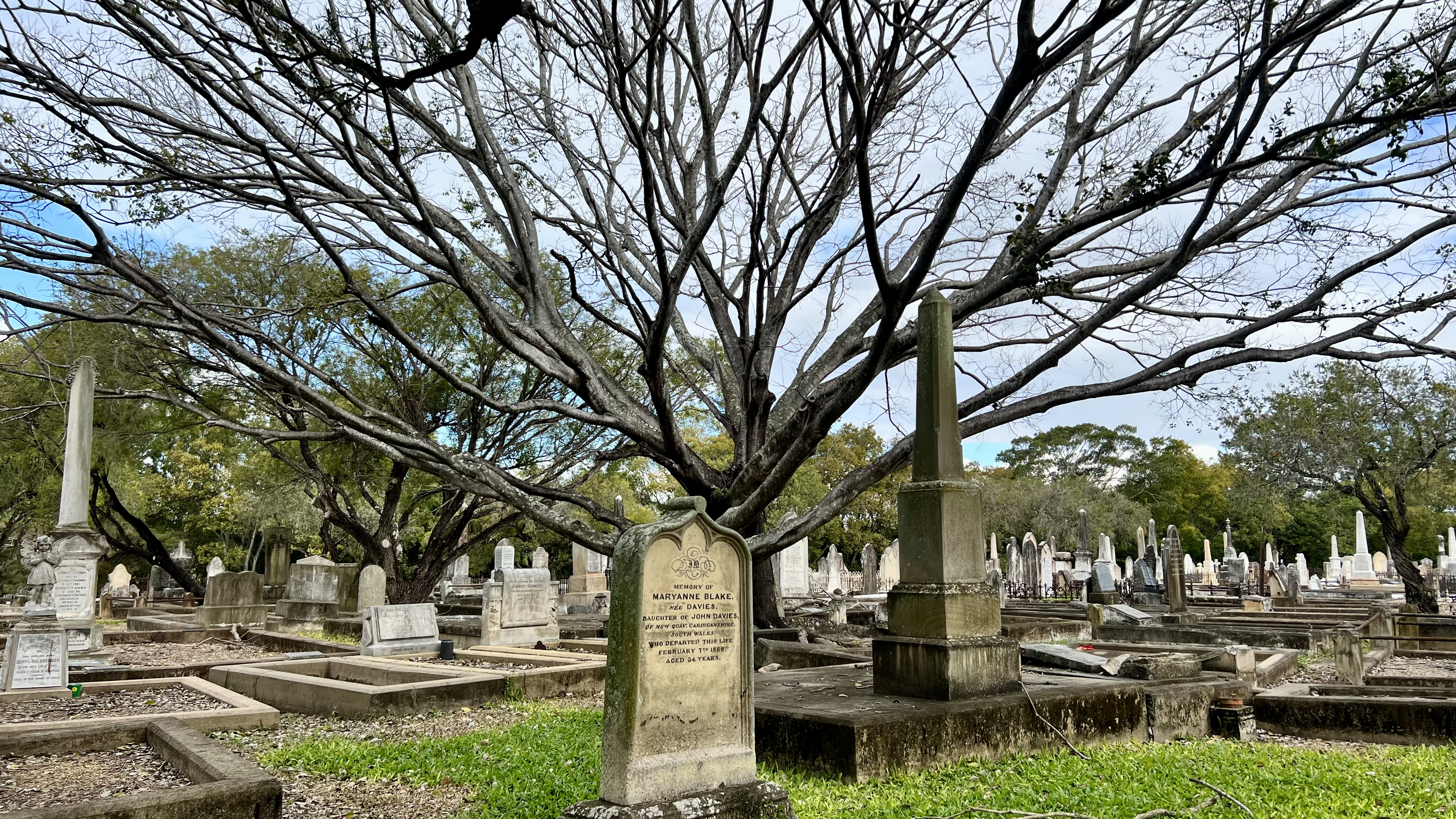
- Nundah Cemetery

- Location within Queensland
- 27.4074°S 153.0682°E
- Location: 88 Hedley Avenue, Nundah, City of Brisbane, Queensland, Australia

History
- Design period: 1840s–1860s (mid-19th century)
- Built: 1840s–1963

Site notes
- Owner: Brisbane City Council

Queensland Heritage Register
- Official name: Nundah Cemetery, German Station Cemetery
- Type: state heritage (built, archaeological)
- Designated: 21 October 1992
- Reference no.: 600271
- Significant period: 1840– (social); 1840–1963 (historical, fabric)
- Significant components: headstone, grave marker, rotunda, cemetery, gate – entrance

Nundah Cemetery, also known as German Station Cemetery, is a heritage-listed cemetery at 88 Hedley Avenue, Nundah, City of Brisbane, Queensland, Australia. It was built from the 1840s to 1963 and was added to the Queensland Heritage Register on 21 October 1992.

== History ==
The cemetery was established in 1846 by a small group of German Lutheran missionaries who, in 1838, had founded Queensland's first free settlement, at Zion's Hill above Kedron Brook. At that time, the district was known as "German station", as the earliest settlers were Lutheran missionaries, the cemetery was originally known as "German Station Cemetery". The district was originally outside of Brisbane and was a farming community. At that time, the road beside the cemetery was known as "Cemetery Road". Only one death had been recorded at German Station by 1845, but several children died the following year. The beginnings of the cemetery are depicted on an 1846 sketch by missionary Carl Gerler.

As the German station settlement was established in 1838, it is unclear where the earliest burials in the settlement would have occurred. The site had been established as a graveyard before James Warner first surveyed it as a cemetery reserve in 1862. None of the wooden crosses marking the earliest graves has survived, but the oldest headstone dates to March 1855.

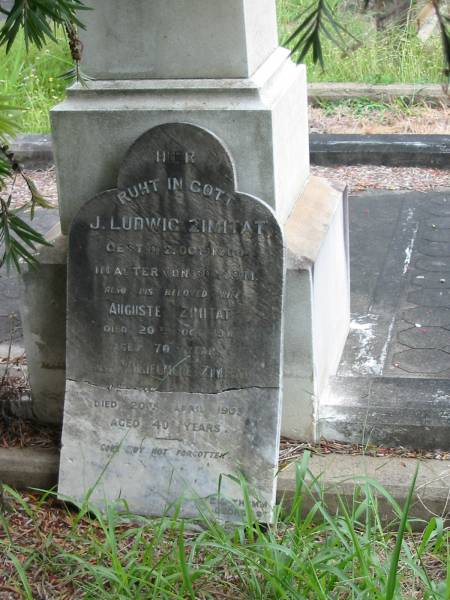
German grave in Nundah cemetery

Many of the pioneers of the Nundah district are buried in the cemetery. Although the German Station mission was scaled down between 1844 and 1850, several of the missionary families remained in the area. From these settlers the first trustees of the German Station Cemetery were appointed in 1866.

Cemetery trustees had a duty to maintain a record of the burials. The first recorded burial was in 1887, it is believed earlier records may have been lost in a flood. The public can access and update the Nundah burial records by providing death certificates showing a burial at the Nundah Cemetery.

The development of the Sandgate railway line (now the Shorncliffe railway line) through the district in 1882 opened it up for residential area housing for the growing town of Brisbane. As "Cemetery Road" was regarded as an unattractive name for a residential street, around 1934 it was renamed "Hedley Avenue" after local doctor Hedley Brown.

In 1914 a small shelter pavilion was erected at the cemetery. It was designed by architect John Henry Burley, who practised in Brisbane from 1886 until 1936. The builder was J MacDonald, and the structure cost £175.

In the 1930s, Brisbane City Council took over the management of the cemetery from the local trustees as Nundah was now within the boundaries of the City of Brisbane. In 1963 the cemetery was closed as no new grave sites were available.

A sexton resided in the cemetery grounds from at the 1890s. Since 1975 one sexton based at Lutwyche has cared for the Bald Hills, Lutwyche and Nundah cemeteries. The Nundah sexton's house has been demolished.

In 1982 the Nundah Historic Cemetery Preservation Association was formed to help tend to and restore the site.

=== War Graves ===
There are seven service personnel buried in this cemetery whose graves are registered by the Commonwealth War Graves Commission, six from World War I and one from World War II.

=== Current use ===
Although the cemetery has no space for new gravesites, it is possible to place cremated ashes in existing family graves or in the columbarium walls. It is also possible for family members to be buried in existing graves which are not yet full. In 2011, the Brisbane City Council raised concerns about its ability to continue to provide new gravesites after another 10 or 15 years given that burial rights are perpetual in Queensland. As a consequence, Brisbane City Council allows the reuse of full family graves in Nundah Cemetery.

== Description ==
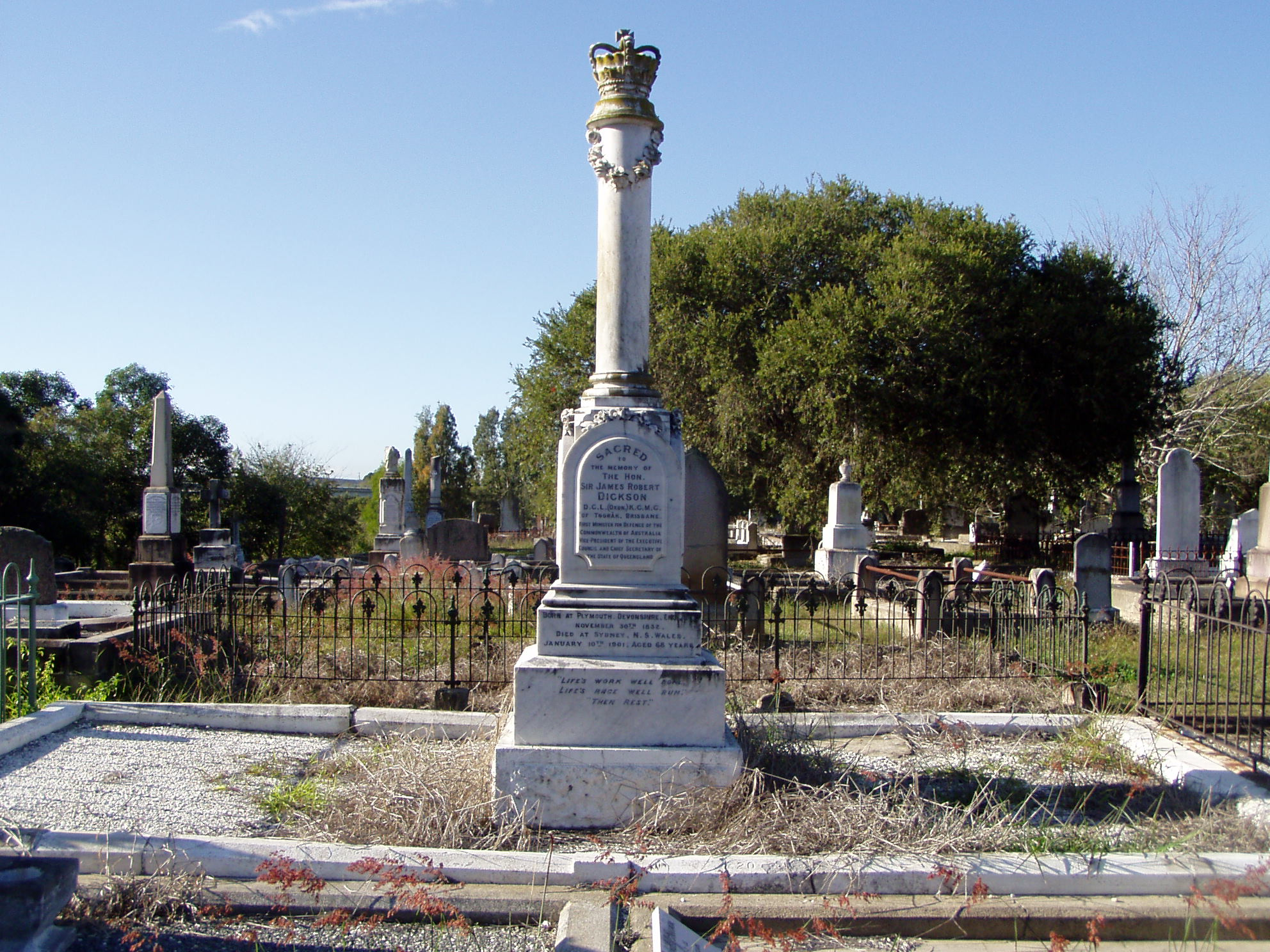
Monument for Premier Dickson, Nundah Cemetery, 2005

The cemetery reserve is located on a small, elliptical ridge above Kedron Brook at Nundah, adjacent to Albert Bishop Park. The entrance has a westerly aspect to Hedley Avenue.

Native trees have been planted recently around the perimeter, but the cemetery itself is exposed and the land subject to erosion. Many of the pathways have been concreted to prevent further deterioration.

The cemetery is crowded, with little order to the layout of graves, and no denominational segregation.

It contains a variety of headstone and decorative memorial monument types, from high Victorian to modern stela. An ongoing restoration programme has resulted in many of these being refurbished or replaced, and a number of plaques have been erected on graves of particular historical note.

Toward the front of the reserve, and amidst the gravesites, is an hexagonal rotunda. Constructed of timber posts with arched batten infilling to each facet, the structure is capped by a steeply pitched asbestos tile roof, with terracotta ridging and centre finial. The rotunda was renovated in the 1980s.

The cemetery furnishes a unique record of the families who developed Nundah and surrounding districts from 1838. Included amongst the graves are those of many of the early German missionaries and their families, and that of Sir James Dickson (Queensland Premier from 1898 1899).

== Heritage listing ==
Nundah Cemetery was listed on the Queensland Heritage Register on 21 October 1992.

== Notable people buried in Nundah Cemetery ==
- William Maxwell 1867–1921, former member for Queensland Parliament. Was elected to the Queensland Legislative Assembly as the member for Burke in 1899. Maxwell founding member when the Federation of Australia was formed in 1901, making a monumental moment in Australia's history. Maxwell has a large family plot in Nundah having had six children himself.

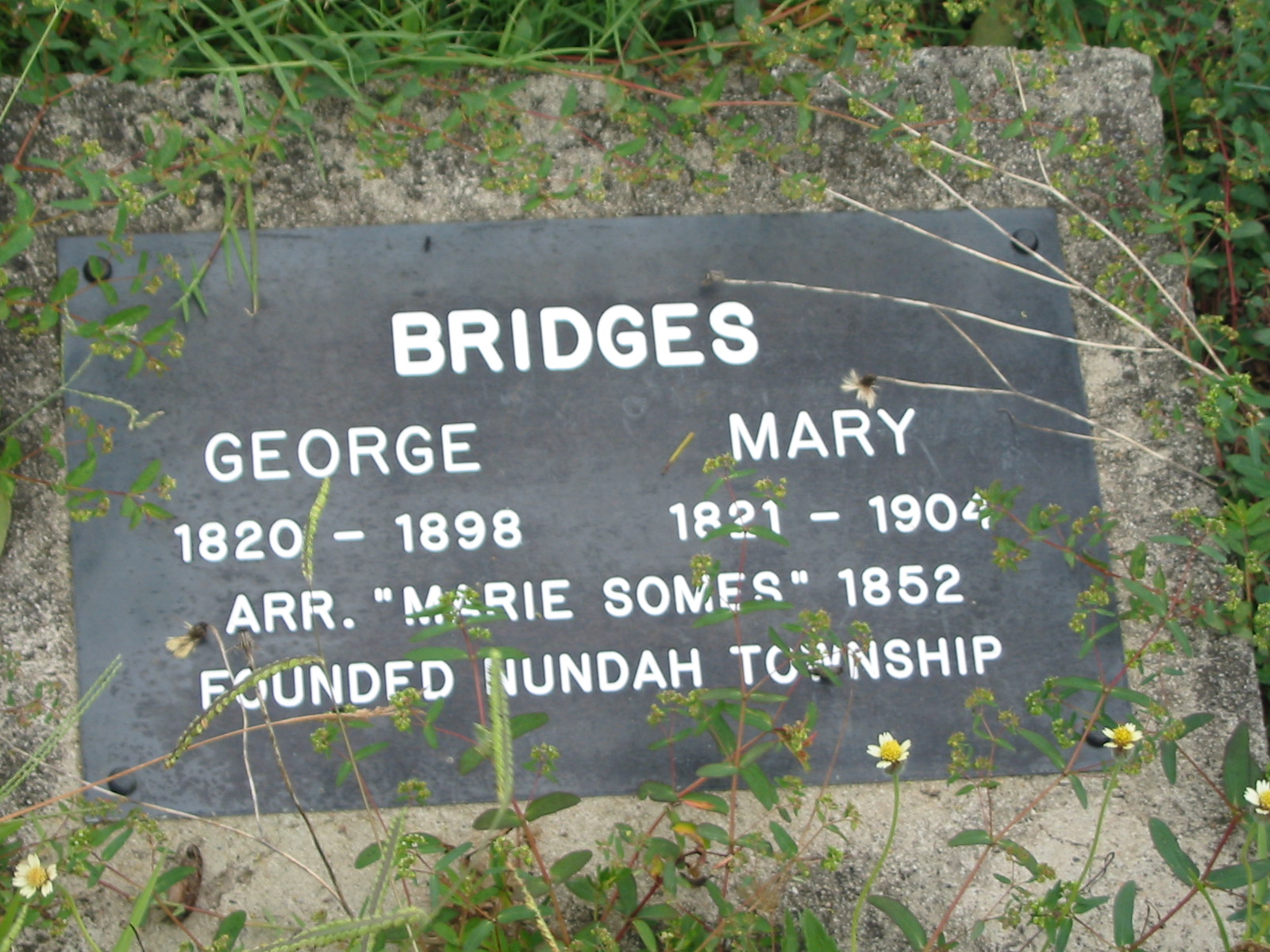
Modern plaque for George and Mary Bridges, founders of the Nundah township, 2005

- George Bridges and wife Mary (née Brightman), pioneers who developed the Nundah township
- Thomas Bridges, Member of the Legislative Assembly for the electorate of Nundah
- James Dickson, Premier of Queensland and Commonwealth Minister for Defence
- John McMaster, the "Father of Brisbane", 4 times mayor of Brisbane, Member of both the Queensland Legislative Assembly and Queensland Legislative Council

See also Category:Burials at Nundah Cemetery

== See also ==
- List of cemeteries in Australia
