= John Hayes (Queensland politician) =

Australian politician

John Hayes JP

Member of the Queensland Legislative Assembly for Nundah
- In office 11 June 1932 – 3 May 1947
- Preceded by: Wiliam Kelso
- Succeeded by: Frank Roberts

Personal details
- Born: John Vincent Hayes; 19 July 1897 Ipswich, Queensland, Australia
- Died: 16 June 1986 (aged 88) Brisbane, Queensland, Australia
- Party: Labor
- Spouse: Eleanore Ann (m.1923 d.1970)
- Occupation: Insurance salesman

John Vincent Hayes (19 July 1897 – 16 June 1986) was an Australian politician. He was a Labor Party member of the Queensland Legislative Assembly from 1932 to 1947, representing the electorate of Nundah.

Hayes was born at Ipswich, Queensland, the son of John Patrick Hayes and his wife Mary Jane (née McGrath). He was educated at St Mary's Catholic Primary School and the Christian Brothers College, both in Ipswich. On leaving school he was a draper's assistant, working in Ipswich, Maryborough, and Brisbane before becoming an insurance salesman. A long-time member of the Shop Assistants and Warehouse Employees Union, he became its executive officer and a union delegate, and was the secretary of the Nundah branch of the Labor Party. He married Eleanore Ann O'Neill on 3 November 1923 (died 1970) in Brisbane; together they had one son (died 1961) and four daughters.

He was elected to the Legislative Assembly at the 1932 election. In 1942, he obtained leave from parliament to serve in World War II, serving as a corporal in the 8th Australian Motor Corps of the Second Australian Imperial Force until 1944. Hayes lost preselection for the 1947 state election to Frank Roberts and retired from politics. After leaving politics, he was a clerical officer and investigator for the Queensland Government Tourist Bureau.

Hayes died in June 1986 and was buried at the Pinnaroo Lawn Cemetery. He remained involved with the Labor Party at a local level until his death, and was the second-last surviving member of the 1932-1942 Forgan Smith government.

Parliament of Queensland
Preceded by Wiliam Kelso	Member for Nundah; 1932–1947	Succeeded by Frank Roberts
