= George Agnew (Australian politician) =

Australian politician

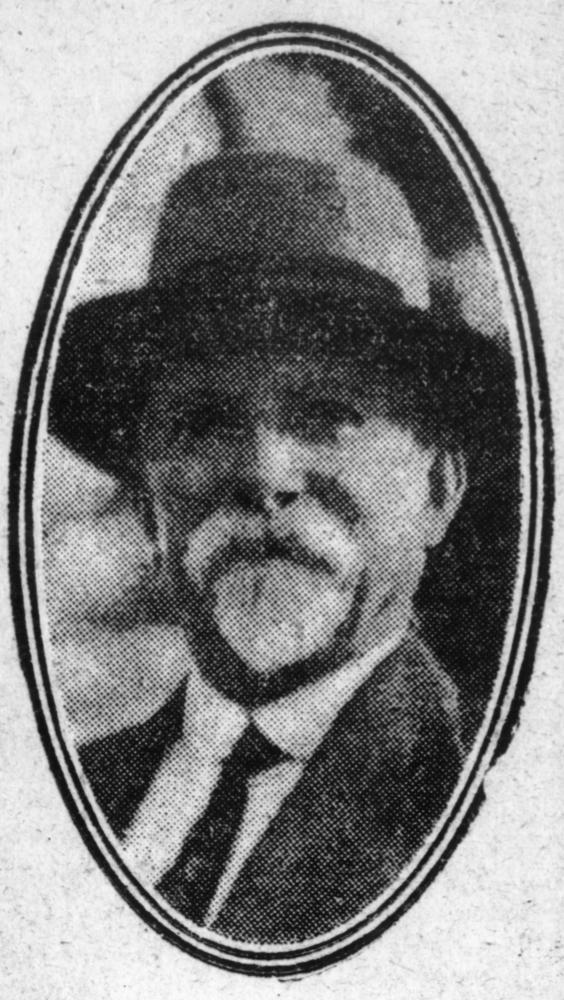
- George Agnew in 1925

Member of the Queensland Legislative Assembly for Nundah
- In office 10 May 1888 – 21 March 1896
- Preceded by: New seat
- Succeeded by: Thomas Bridges

Personal details
- Born: George Agnew; 14 June 1853 Manchester, England
- Died: 19 December 1934 (aged 81) Sandgate, Queensland, Australia
- Resting place: Toowong Cemetery
- Spouse: Mary Elizabeth Walmsley (m.1880 d.1930)
- Occupation: Company director

George Agnew (14 June 1853 – 19 December 1934) was a member of the Queensland Legislative Assembly.

== Biography ==
Agnew was born in Manchester, England, the son of Hugh Agnew and his wife Eliza (née Byron). After being employed in the Manchester railway works he migrated to Sydney in 1880 and then to Brisbane in 1882. He became the managing director of the Queensland Railway Carriage, Wagon & Tramcar Company and also Queensland Deposit and Grassdale Land Company.

As a boy he was very interested in music and was a member on the choir of the Manchester Catholic Cathedral where he became associated with Leslie Stuart, who was the composer of Florodora and other musical comedies.

On The 19 February 1880 he married Mary Elizabeth Walmsley (died 1930) and together had four sons and four daughters. One of his daughters, Beatrice, went on to marry William Webb, who was later a Judge on the High Court of Australia and also Chief Justice of Queensland. Agnew died at Fallowfield, his Sandgate home in December 1934 and his funeral proceeded from Fallowfield to the Toowong Cemetery.

== Public career ==
At the 1888 Queensland colonial election, Agnew won the new seat of Nundah in the Queensland Legislative Assembly, defeating Robert Bulcock in a tight contest. He easily held the seat in 1893, defeating Thomas Bridges and John Appel. At the 1896 Queensland colonial election however, Bridges had his revenge and defeated Agnew.

Agnew was also an alderman on the Sandgate Council.

Parliament of Queensland
New seat	Member for Nundah; 1888–1896	Succeeded by Thomas Bridges
