= Electoral district of Nundah =

Nundah Queensland—Legislative Assembly
- State: Queensland
- Created: 1888
- Abolished: 1992
- Namesake: Nundah, Queensland

Nundah was an electoral district of the Legislative Assembly in the Australian state of Queensland from 1888 to 1992.

The district was based in the northern suburbs of Brisbane. At the time of its abolition it included the suburbs of Nundah, Eagle Farm, Hendra and Toombul.

== History ==
In the 1904 Queensland state election, the sitting Ministerialist Thomas Bridges faced a formidable opponent in the person of Sir Arthur Rutledge. Rutledge had been a Wesleyan minister in New England and solicitor in Brisbane, before entering the Queensland parliament, where he rose to the office of Attorney-General and accepted a knighthood in 1903. As part of his strategy to become Premier, Rutledge decided not to recontest his seat of Maranoa but rather contest an electorate closer to Brisbane, and chose the semi-rural seat of Nundah which, he assumed, would be easily won by a man of his political experience, especially as it was already held by a fellow Ministerialist. Many large business houses backed Rutledge, as did the editor of the Brisbane Courier (Rutledge's son-in-law Charles Brunsdon Fletcher was the editor of the Brisbane Courier until 1903). His public meetings were packed with prominent religious and political leaders, in contrast to a low-key campaign run by Bridges based on his community service and commitment to keep the cost of railway tickets low. Contrary to every prediction, Bridges won the election by 253 votes. This humiliating loss ended Rutledge's political career, and he accepted an appointment as district judge.

== Members for Nundah ==
Member	Party	Term
George Agnew	Conservative	1888–1890
George Agnew	Ministerial	1890–1896
Thomas Bridges	Ministerial	1896–1903
Thomas Bridges	Liberal	1903–1907
Thomas Bridges	Kidstonites	1907
Richard Sumner	Kidstonites	1907–1909
Richard Sumner	Independent Opposition	1909
Thomas Bridges	Liberal	1909–1916
Thomas Bridges	National	1916–1918
Hubert Sizer	National	1918–1923
William Kelso	United Party	1923–1925
William Kelso	Country and Progressive National	1925–1932
John Hayes	Labor	1932–1947
Frank Roberts	Labor	1947–1953
Frank Roberts	Independent	1953–1956
Jim Hadley	Labor	1956–1957
Jim Hadley	Queensland Labor	1957–1957
William Knox	Liberal	1957–1989
Phil Heath	Labor	1989–1991
Terry Sullivan	Labor	1991–1992

== See also ==
- Electoral districts of Queensland
- Members of the Queensland Legislative Assembly by year
- Category:Members of the Queensland Legislative Assembly by name
