= Citizens' Municipal Organisation =

Political party in Brisbane, Australia

- Formation: 21 March 1935 (as Citizens' Municipal Party); 23 June 1936 (as a greater organisation)
- Dissolved: c. 1976
- Affiliations: United Australia Party; Queensland People's Party/Liberal Party

The Citizens' Municipal Organisation (CMO), known before its expansion as the Citizens' Municipal Party (CMP), was an Australian political organisation that ran in local elections in the City of Brisbane.

== History ==
The CMO was formed in 1936 after the recently formed Citizens' Municipal Party decided to expand to a greater organisation, citing a desire to avoid party politics. Despite this claim, it was closely affiliated with the Queensland branch of the United Australia Party in the early part of the organisation's existence, before moving to the Queensland People's Party when the Queensland UAP separated in 1944. The People's Party became the Queensland division of the Liberal Party, and CMO aligned itself with the Queensland Liberal division until its own dissolution.

It ran candidates in City of Brisbane elections throughout its existence. Two Lord Mayors were elected representing the CMO — John Beals Chandler from 1940 to 1952 and Reg Groom from 1955 to 1961.

The official dissolution date of the organisation is unclear. Before the 1967 election, a number of CMO members defected and formed the Liberal Civic Party, which ran candidates against both the CMO and Labor at that election but failed to win a seat. At the 1973 election, the CMO was described as "moribund" and the Brisbane Civic Party was formed to challenge Labor, albeit unsuccessfully. Finally, from the 1976 election onwards, the Liberals decided to run under their own banner rather than that of the CMO or any other secondary organisation, certainly dissolving the ostensibly nonpartisan group in an official sense if it had not been already.
