= Charles Brunsdon Fletcher =

English-born Australian surveyor and journalist

- Born: 5 August 1859; Taunton, Somerset, England
- Died: 17 December 1946 (aged 87); Kirribilli, New South Wales
- Education: Newington College; Fort Street High School
- Occupations: Surveyor and Journalist
- Spouse(s): Florence Mary Macleay, daughter of Sir Arthur Rutledge
- Children: Two sons and two daughter
- Parent(s): Ruth (née Bloor) and Charles Fletcher

Charles Brunsdon Fletcher (5 August 1859 – 17 December 1946) was an English-born Australian surveyor and journalist who served as the editor of the Sydney Morning Herald for twenty years.

== Birth and education ==
Fletcher was the third of thirteen children of Ruth (née Bloor) and Charles Fletcher of Taunton, Somerset, England. At age five, his father joined his eldest brother, Joseph Horner Fletcher, in New Zealand as a Wesleyan missionary. Eight years later the family moved to Sydney and Fletcher attended Newington College, where his uncle, Joseph Horner Fletcher, was president and another uncle, Joseph James Fletcher, was a teacher. Charles Brunsdon Fletcher completed his education at Fort Street High School.

== Surveyor ==
On completion of his school years, Fletcher joined the Survey Department of New South Wales as a cadet. He rose to supernumerary draftsman in 1879 and became a field assistant four-year later, Before moving to Brisbane in 1884 he worked on the Detail Survey of the City of Sydney. He obtained his Queensland survey licence in 1885 and commenced private practice. For five years from 1888 he served on the Board of Examiners of Licensed Surveyors.

== Journalist ==
In 1893, Fletcher became a journalist and joined the Brisbane Courier as a leader-writer. He had previously written for William Lane's Boomerang and had served as secretary of the Brisbane Literary Circle. He was also appointed Queensland correspondent of the Melbourne Argus. Fletcher was elected to Ithaca Shire Council from 1892 until 1898 and served as president in 1894. In December 1898 he became the editor-in-chief of the Brisbane Courier and served as such until April 1903.

== Sydney Morning Herald ==
Fletcher returned to Sydney in 1903 as an associate editor of The Sydney Morning Herald and from 1918 until 1937 was Editor. When King George V and Queen Mary were crowned in 1911 he was a member of the Australian delegation and represented the Herald at the fourth Imperial Press Conference in London in 1930. For four years from 1923, Fletcher was the President of the New South Wales Institute of Journalists.

== University of Sydney ==
He served on the Senate of the University of Sydney from 1923 until 1939 and was instrumental in its establishment of a diploma course in journalism. Fletcher further served the university as a lay member of the Council of Wesley College from 1919. The Charles Brunsdon Fletcher Prize for Pacific History is awarded annually by the university.

== Clubs ==
Fletcher was a member of the Australian Club in Sydney.

== Publications ==
- The New Pacific: British Policy and German Aims – MacMillan (1917)
- The Problem of the Pacific – Heinemann (1919)
- Stevenson's Germany: The Case Against Germany in the Pacific – Scribner (1920)
- The Black Knight of the Pacific – Australasian Publishing Company (1944)
- Coolah Valley (1927)
- Murray Valley (1926)
- Water Magic: Australia and the Future – Sands (1945)
- The Great Wheel: An Editor's Adventures – Angus and Robertson (1940)

== Bibliography ==
- A Century of Journalism. (Syd, 1942)
- Company of Heralds (Melb, 1981) Gavin Souter
